= Given the Movie =

Given the Movie may refer to:

- Given the Movie (2020 film), a Japanese animated romantic drama film, based on the manga series
- Given the Movie (2024 film), a Japanese two-part animated romantic drama film, based on the manga series

== See also ==
- Given (manga), a Japanese manga series
