= List of Japanese animation studios =

Alphabetical anime studio list

This is a list of Japanese animation studios.

== A ==
- ファインフィルムズ
- A-1 Pictures (株式会社A-1 Pictures)
- A.C.G.T (エー・シー・ジー・ティー)
- A.P.P.P. (Another Push Pin Planning) (アナザープッシュピン・プランニング)
- Actas (株式会社アクタス)
- Ajiado (株式会社亜細亜堂)
- Anime International Company (AIC) (株式会社アニメ・インターナショナルカンパニ)
- Aniplex (株式会社アニプレックス)
- Arms (有限会社アームス)
- Artland (株式会社アートランド)
- Artmic (有限会社アートミック)
- Arvo Animation (株式会社アルボアニメーション)
- Asahi Production (旭プロダクション)
- Ashi Productions (葦プロダクション)
- Asread (アスリード)
- Atelier Pontdarc Co., Ltd. (株式会社Atelier Pontdarc)
- AXsiZ (株式会社AXsiZ)

== B ==
- Bandai Namco Pictures (株式会社バンダイナムコピクチャーズ)
- Bee Train (ビィートレイン株式会社)
- Bibury Animation Studios (合同会社バイブリーアニメーションスタジオ)
- Blue Lynx (ブルーリンクス)
- Bones (ボンズ)
- Brain's Base (ブレインズ・ベース)
- Bridge (ブリッジ)

== C ==
- C-Station (シーステイション株式会社)
- C2C
- Chaos Project (カオスプロジェクト)
- CloverWorks (株式会社CloverWorks)
- CoMix Wave Films (コミックス・ウェーブ・フィル)
- Connect (コネクト)
- Creators in Pack (株式会社クリエイターズインパック)
- CygamesPictures (株式会社CygamesPictures)

== D ==
- Daume (童夢)
- David Production (デイヴィッドプロダクション )
- Digital Frontier (デジタルフロンティア)
- Diomedéa (ディオメディア)
- DLE (株式会社ディー・エル・イー)
- Doga Kobo (動画工房)
- Domerica (株式会社ドメリカ)
- Drive (株式会社ドライブ)

== E ==
- East Fish Studio Inc. (株式会社イーストフィッシュスタジオ)
- Eight Bit (株式会社エイトビット)
- Eiken (エイケン)
- Ekachi Epilka (株式会社エカチエピルカ)
- EMT Squared (株式会社EMTスクエアード)
- Encourage Films (株式会社エンカレッジフィルムズ)
- ENGI (株式会社エンギ)
- Ezo'la (株式会社Ezo'la)
- E&H Production (株式会社E&H production)

== F ==
- Fanworks (株式会社ファンワークス)
- Feel (フィール)
- Felix Film (株式会社FelixFilm)

== G ==
- Gaina (株式会社ガイナ)
- Gainax (ガイナックス)
- Gallop (ぎゃろっぷ)
- Gathering (ギャザリング株式会社)
- Geek Toys (株式会社ギークトイズ)
- Gekkou Production (合同会社月虹)
- GEMBA (株式会社ゲンバ)
- Geno Studio (ジェノスタジオ)
- GoHands (株式会社GoHands)
- Gonzo (ゴンゾ)
- Graphinica (グラフィニカ)
- Grizzly (株式会社 GRIZZLY)
- Group TAC (グループ・タック)

== H ==
- Hal Film Maker (ハルフィルムメーカー)
- Hayate Inc. (株式会社ハヤテHayate)
- Hoods Entertainment (フッズエンタテインメント)

== I ==
- Imagin (イマジン)
- Ishimori Productions (株式会社石森プロ)

== J ==
- J.C.Staff (ジェー・シー・スタッフ)
- JFK (株式会社JFK)
- Jumondou (株式会社寿門堂)

== K ==
- Khara (株式会社カラ)
- Kinema Citrus (キネマシトラス)
- Kitty Films (キティ・フィルム)
- Knack Productions (ナック)
- Kokusai Eiga-sha (国際映画社)
- Kyoto Animation (京都アニメーション)

== L ==
- Lapin Track (ラパントラック)
- Larx Entertainment (株式会社ラークスエンタテインメント)
- Lay-duce (株式会社Lay-duce)
- Lerche (株式会社ラルケ)
- Lesprit (株式会社レスプリ)
- Liber, Inc. (株式会社リーベル)
- Liden Films (株式会社ライデンフィルム)

== M ==
- Madhouse (マッドハウス)
- Magia Doraglier (マギア・ドラグリエ)
- Magic Bus (マジックバス)
- Maho Film (株式会社Maho Film)
- Manglobe (マングローブ)
- MAPPA (株式会社MAPPA)
- Millepensee (ミルパンセ)
- Mook Animation (ムークアニメーション)
- M.S.C (エム・エス・シー)
- Mushi Production (虫プロダクション)

== N ==
- NAZ (株式会社NAZ)
- Nexus (株式会社Nexus)
- Nippon Animation (日本アニメーション)
- Nomad (ノーマッド)
- NUT (株式会社ナット)

== O ==
- Oh! Production (OH!プロダクション or オープロダクション)
- Okuruto Noboru (株式会社オクルトノボル)
- OLM (オー・エル・エム)
- Orange (有限会社オレンジ)
- Ordet (株式会社Ordet)

== P ==
- P.A. Works (ピーエーワークス)
- Pacific Animation Corporation
- Palm Studio (有限会社パルムスタジオ)
- Passione (パッショーネ)
- Pine Jam (パインジャム PINE JAM)
- Platinum Vision (プラチナビジョン株式会社)
- Polygon Pictures (株式会社ポリゴン・ピクチュアズ)
- Production I.G (プロダクション・アイジー)
- Production IMS (株式会社プロダクションアイムズ)
- Project No.9 (株式会社project No.9)

== R ==
- Radix (ラディクス)
- Revoroot (株式会社レヴォルト)

== S ==
- Sanzigen (株式会社サンジゲン)
- Satelight (サテライト)
- Science Saru (サイエンスSARU)
- Seven (セブン)
- Seven Arcs (株式会社Seven Arcs)
- Shaft (シャフト)
- Shin-Ei Animation (シンエイ動画)
- Shirogumi (株式会社白組)
- Shogakukan Music & Digital Entertainment (小学館ミュージック&デジタル エンタテイメント)
- Shuka (朱夏)
- Signal.MD (株式会社シグナル・エムディ)
- Silver Link (株式会社SILVER LINK.)
- Sola Digital Arts (株式会社 SOLA DIGITAL ARTS)
- Square Enix Image Studio Division (株式会社スクウェア・エニックス イメージ・スタジオ部)
- Staple Entertainment Co., Ltd. (Staple Entertainment株式会社)
- Studio 3Hz (株式会社3Hz)
- Studio 4°C (株式会社STUDIO 4°C)
- Studio A-Cat (株式会社studio A-CAT)
- Studio Bind (株式会社スタジオバインド)
- Studio Blanc (株式会社スタジオブラン)
- Studio Chizu (スタジオ地図)
- Studio Colorido (株式会社スタジオコロリド)
- Studio Comet (スタジオコメット)
- Studio Deen (スタジオディーン)
- Studio elle Co., Ltd. (有限会社スタジオエル)
- Studio Fantasia (スタジオ・ファンタジア)
- Studio Ghibli (スタジオジブリ)
- Studio Gokumi (Studio五組)
- Studio Hibari (スタジオ雲雀)
- Studio Kai (スタジオKAI)
- Studio Lings (株式会社スタジオリングス)
- Studio Live (スタジオ・ライブ)
- Studio Mother (スタジオマザー株式会社)
- Studio Nue (スタジオぬえ)
- Studio Pierrot (株式会社スタジオぴえろ)
- Studio Ponoc (スタジオポノック)
- Studio Puyukai (スタジオぷYUKAI)
- Studio Signpost (株式会社スタジオ サインポスト)
- Studio Trigger (トリガー)
- Studio VOLN (株式会社studio VOLN)
- Sunrise (サンライズ)
- SynergySP (有限会社SynergySP)

== T ==
- Tatsunoko Production (タツノコプロ)
- Tear Studio (株式会社ティアスタジオ)
- Telecom Animation Film (テレコム・アニメーションフィルム)
- Tezuka Productions (手塚プロダクション)
- TMS Entertainment (トムス・エンタテインメント)
- TNK (ティー・エヌ・ケー)
- Toei Animation (東映アニメーション)
- Toho Animation Studio (株式会社TOHO animation STUDIO)
- Top Craft (トップクラフト)
- Trans Arts (トランス・アーツ)
- Triangle Staff (トライアングルスタッフ)
- Troyca (トロイカ)
- Tsuchida Production (土田プロダクション)
- Typhoon Graphics (株式会社颱風グラフィックス)

== U ==
- Ufotable (ユーフォーテーブル)

== V ==
- Vega Entertainment (ベガエンタテイメント)
- Video Tokyo Productions (ビデオ東京プロダクション)

== W ==
- Walt Disney Animation Japan (ウォルト ・ ディズニー ・ アニメーション日本)
- Walt Disney Television International Japan (ウォルト ・ ディズニー ・ テレビジョンインターナショナル ・ ジャパン)
- WAO World (ワオワールド)
- White Fox (株式会社WHITE FOX)
- Wit Studio (ウィットスタジオ)

== X ==
- Xebec (ジーベック)

== Y ==
- Yaoyorozu (ヤオヨロズ株式会社)
- Yokohama Animation Laboratory (株式会社横浜アニメーションラボ)
- Yostar Pictures (株式会社)
- Yumeta Company (ユメタカンパニー)

== Z ==
- Zero-G (株式会社ゼロジー)
- Zexcs (ゼクシズ)

== See also ==
- List of anime directors
- List of animation studios
