= Given the Movie (2024 film) =

2024 two-part film by Noriko Hashimoto

- Japanese: 映画 ギヴン
- Revised Hepburn: Eiga Givun
- Directed by: Noriko Hashimoto
- Screenplay by: Yuniko Ayana
- Based on: Given by Natsuki Kizu
- Starring: Shōgo Yano; Yuma Uchida; Masatomo Nakazawa; Takuya Eguchi; Fumiya Imai; Taito Ban
- Cinematography: Sena Nagakawa
- Edited by: Rie Itō
- Music by: Michiru
- Production company: Lerche
- Distributed by: Aniplex
- Release dates: January 27, 2024 (Hiiragi mix); September 20, 2024 (To the Sea)
- Running time: 70 minutes (Hiiragi Mix); 80 minutes (To the Sea)
- Country: Japan
- Language: Japanese

Given the Movie (Japanese: 映画 ギヴン, Hepburn: Eiga Givun) is a 2024 Japanese two-part animated romantic drama film directed by Noriko Hashimoto and written by Yuniko Ayana based on the manga series of the same name by Natsuki Kizu. Produced by Lerche and distributed by Aniplex, the two-part film is the second and third film for the series, following 2020 film of the same title, and serve as a direct sequel to the film, as well as the final adaptation of Natsuki Kizu's original manga series.

The voice cast includes Shōgo Yano, Yuma Uchida, Masatomo Nakazawa, Takuya Eguchi, Fumiya Imai, and Taito Ban, all reprising their roles from earlier entries in the franchise. The two-part film was released in Japan in 2024, with the first film, Hiiragi Mix, (Note: 映画 ギヴン 柊mix, Eiga Givun: Hīragi mikkusu; lit. "Given the Movie: Hiiragi Mix") on January 27, and the second film, To the Sea, (Note: 映画 ギヴン 海へ, Eiga Givun: Umi e; lit. "Given the Movie: To the Sea") released on September 20.

== Synopsis ==
=== Hiiragi Mix ===
While Given auditions for a music festival but fails to qualify, Hiragi and Shizusumi's band, SYH, prepares for a major performance but loses their guitarist. Hiragi, seeking to salvage both the band and his own emotional state, asks Ritsuka Uenoyama to fill in. As the two bands' paths intertwine, Hiragi confronts his unresolved feelings toward Shizusumi, leading to a quiet but powerful emotional shift. Through rehearsals, performances, and intimate moments, the film explores Hiragi's journey toward self-forgiveness and his evolving connection with Shizusumi, culminating in a hopeful, if understated, resolution as their bond begins to deepen beyond friendship.

=== To the Sea ===
Mafuyu, feeling conflicted and uncertain about his future, hesitates to accept the invitation to debut with his band Given, despite their growing momentum. At the same time, SYH—the band led by Hiragi Kashima and Shizusumi Yagi—moves forward with their debut plans, with Ritsuka temporarily joining them to help finish a song Hiragi entrusted to him. When Mafuyu sends a message to Ritsuka saying, "I want to see you," Ritsuka rushes to him, only to find Mafuyu emotionally withdrawn and resistant to music. Caught between his love for Ritsuka, his lingering grief, and his complicated relationship with music, Mafuyu remains stuck in silence until a surprising offer from renowned violinist Ugetsu Murata opens up a new path for him to consider.

== Voice cast ==
- Shōgo Yano as Mafuyu Satō
- Yuma Uchida as Ritsuka Uenoyama
- Masatomo Nakazawa as Haruki Nakayama
- Takuya Eguchi as Akihiko Kaji
- Fumiya Imai as Hiiragi Kashima
- Taito Ban as Shizusumi Yagi

== Production ==
In March 2023, it was announced that a sequel film to 2020 Given the Movie film, which is based on Natsuki Kizu's manga series of the name was in development. Later on August of that year, it was announced that the sequel was produced as a two-part film. Noriko Hashimoto is directing the two-part film at Lerche, with Yuniko Ayana, Mina Osawa and Michiru returning to provide the screenplay, character designs and compose the music respectively. On October of that year, the title of the first film was unveiled, Hiiragi mix, with Japanese band Centimillimental providing the theme song, "Super Ultra I LOVE YOU". In January 2024, it was announced that the second film's title was revealed as "To the Sea". Centimillimental also provided the theme song for the second film, titled "Will" (結言(ゆいごん), Yuigon).

== Release ==
The two-part film was released in theaters in Japan in 2024, with the first film, Hiiragi mix on January 27, and the second film, To the Sea on September 20. Hiiragi mix was also released in Taiwan by Cai Chang Asia on April 3, 2024.

== Reception ==
=== Box office ===
Hiiragi mix ranked number 1 in the mini-theater ranking in both opening weekend and the following week. To the Sea also ranked number 1 in the mini-theater ranking in its opening weekend.
