= L'étranger series =

Yaoi manga series

- Cover of the Japanese version of L'étranger de la Plage, first released on July 25, 2014

エトランゼシリーズ (Etoranze Shirīzu)
- Genre: Boys' love
- Manga

L'étranger de la Plage
- Written by: Kanna Kii
- Published by: Shodensha
- English publisher: NA: Renta!, Seven Seas Entertainment
- Imprint: Feel Comics On BLUE
- Magazine: On BLUE
- Original run: July 2013 – 2014
- Volumes: 6
- Manga

L'étranger du Zéphyr
- Written by: Kanna Kii
- Published by: Shodensha
- English publisher: NA: Seven Seas Entertainment
- Imprint: On BLUE Comics
- Magazine: On BLUE
- Original run: July 25, 2014 – present
- Volumes: 6
- Anime television film

The Stranger by the Shore
- Directed by: Akiyo Ohashi
- Music by: Mina Kubota
- Studio: Studio Hibari
- English network: Funimation
- Released: November 9, 2020
- Runtime: 59 minutes

The L'étranger series (Japanese: エトランゼシリーズ, Hepburn: Etoranze Shirīzu; lit. "Stranger series") is a Japanese boys' love (BL) manga series written and illustrated by Kanna Kii. The first book, L'étranger de la Plage (海辺のエトランゼ, Umibe no Etoranze; also titled Seaside Stranger or The Stranger by the Shore in the English versions), was serialized in the bimonthly manga magazine On BLUE from 2013 to 2014. It was followed up with a sequel series, L'étranger du Zéphyr (春風のエトランゼ, Harukaze no Etoranze; lit. "Stranger in the Spring Breeze"). L'étranger de la Plage has been published in English by the digital distribution platform Renta! under the title The Stranger by the Beach, and by Seven Seas Entertainment under the title Seaside Stranger. An anime film adaptation produced by Studio Hibari premiered on September 11, 2020.

== Plot ==
=== L'étranger de la Plage ===
Shun Hashimoto is a gay novelist living in Okinawa who meets Mio Chibana, an orphaned high school student living with his relatives after his mother's death. However, Mio's reaction towards Shun reaching out to him reminds him of the estrangement from his parents after they discovered his sexual orientation. As Shun and Mio grow closer, Mio confesses that he is moving to the city, but promises to keep in contact once there.

Three years later, Mio suddenly moves back and confesses he is in love with Shun, but Shun is overcome with guilt from depriving him of a "normal" life. Meanwhile, Shun's childhood friend and ex-fiancée, Sakurako, arrives at the island to persuade him to return to Hokkaido due to his father's poor health. Shun is adamant on staying with Mio, but Mio urges him to return to reconcile with his family. Realizing Mio is genuinely in love with him and sensing the truth in his words, Shun decides to return to Hokkaido and asks Mio to accompany him.

=== L'étranger du Zéphyr ===
With Mio accompanying him, Shun visits his parents' house in Hokkaido and discovers Fumi, his younger brother adopted during his absence, and Sakurako had tricked him into reconciling with his father. Shun and Mio move in with the Hashimotos, with Shun's father and Fumi struggling to fully accept them as a couple. During Parents' Observation Day at Fumi's school, Shun unexpectedly runs into Wada, his classmate and first, albeit unrequited love. In the spring, Shun publishes his first novel and instantly gains media attention in spite of his anonymity due to being branded as a gay novelist. Five years later, Shun has taken a break from writing novels, while Fumi has become rebellious and resents him for rejecting Sakurako.

== Characters ==
Shun Hashimoto (橋本 駿, Hashimoto Shun)
Voiced by: Taishi Murata (drama CD, film) (Japanese); Jessie James Grelle (English)
Shun is a 27-year-old gay novelist. Originally from Hokkaido, he moved to Okinawa to live with his grandmother after his parents discovered his sexual orientation. While he is attracted to Mio, he is reluctant to disclose his thoughts, as he often believes that Mio would never understand what being gay is like and would be better off not dating him.
Mio Chibana (知花 実央, Chibana Mio)
Voiced by: Yoshitsugu Matsuoka (drama CD, film) (Japanese); Justin Briner (English)
Mio is a 20-year-old freeter. An Okinawa native who lives with relatives after his parents die. After his mother's death when he was in high school, he meets Shun. Initially offended at Shun's attitude, he soon falls in love and pursues him romantically when he returns to Okinawa as an adult. Mio attempts to get a better understanding of Shun's concerns, despite Shun constantly dismissing his advances.
Sakurako (桜子)
Voiced by: Yū Shimamura (drama CD, film) (Japanese); Amber Lee Connors (English)
Sakurako is Shun's childhood friend who has known he was gay since high school. Through an arranged marriage, she was also Shun's fiancée until he came out to his parents during the wedding ceremony. Despite this, Sakurako is still in love with him.
Eri (絵理)
Voiced by: Ayumi Fujimura (drama CD), Kanae Itō (film) (Japanese); Morgan Garrett (English)
Eri is a woman who previously lived with Shun and his grandmother in Okinawa before moving out to live with her girlfriend, Suzu.
Suzu (鈴)
Voiced by: Sayaka Nakaya (drama CD, film) (Japanese); Bryn Apprill (English)
Suzu is Eri's girlfriend.
Fumi Hashimoto (橋本 ふみ, Hashimoto Fumi)
Voiced by: Kumiko Watanabe (drama CD)
Fumi is a second-year junior high school student and Shun's younger brother, who was adopted from an orphanage and raised during Shun's absence. He is in love with Sakurako and finds it difficult to accept Shun and Mio's relationship.
Wada (和田)
Wada is Shun's classmate from high school who discovered Shun was gay after realizing Shun was in love with him. His wife, Yoneko, is a lawyer and a fan of Shun's work. They both have a daughter named Chiho from Yoneko's first marriage, who is in Fumi's class and does not get along with Wada.

== Media ==
=== Manga ===
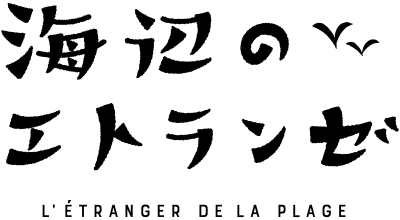
Logo of L'étranger de la Plage

L'étranger de la Plage is written and illustrated by Kanna Kii, and it is her debut manga work. It was serialized in the bimonthly manga anthology On BLUE from 2013 to 2014. The chapters were later released in one bound volume by Shodensha under the Feel Comics On BLUE imprint. The manga is distributed in English by Renta! under the title The Stranger by the Beach. In December 2020, Seven Seas Entertainment announced that it had acquired the license to the series for release in July 2021 under the title Seaside Stranger: Umibe no Étranger.

The manga was followed up with a sequel series titled L'étranger du Zéphyr, which began publication in vol. 14 of On BLUE that was released on July 25, 2014. The chapters were later released in bound volumes by Shodensha under the On BLUE Comics imprint. In May 2021, Seven Seas Entertainment announced that it had acquired the license to the series under the title Seaside Stranger: Harukaze no Étranger

L'étranger de la Plage was adapted into a drama CD starring Taishi Murata as Shun and Yoshitsugu Matsuoka as Mio and was released on August 26, 2016. An exclusive talk CD was included at a bonus for a limited time at Animate. A drama CD adaptation of volume 1 of L'étranger du Zéphyr was released on October 27, 2017.

==== L'étranger de la Plage ====
No.	Title	Original release date	English release date
1	The Stranger By the Beach (Renta!); Seaside Stranger Volume 1: Umibe no Étranger (Seven Seas); Umibe no Etoranze (海辺のエトランゼ)	July 25, 2014; 978-4396783488	September 8, 2016 (Renta!); July 27, 2021 (Seven Seas); 978-1-64827-584-5

==== L'étranger du Zéphyr ====
No.	Title	Original release date	English release date
1	Seaside Stranger Volume Two: Harukaze no Étranger; Harukaze no Etoranze (春風のエトランゼ 1)	July 25, 2015; 978-4396783648	February 8, 2022; 978-1-63858-114-7
2	Seaside Stranger Volume Three: Harukaze no Étranger; Harukaze no Etoranze (春風のエトランゼ 2)	July 25, 2016; 978-4396783884	May 17, 2022; 978-1-63858-245-8
3	Seaside Stranger Volume Four: Harukaze no Étranger; Harukaze no Etoranze (春風のエトランゼ 3)	July 25, 2017; 978-4396784201	August 30, 2022; 978-1-63858-614-2
4	Seaside Stranger Volume Five: Harukaze no Étranger; Harukaze no Etoranze (春風のエトランゼ 4)	August 25, 2020; 978-4396785048	November 22, 2022; 978-1-63858-787-3
5	Seaside Stranger Volume Six: Harukaze no Étranger; Harukaze no Etoranze (春風のエトランゼ 5)	October 25, 2022; 978-4396785529	March 26, 2024; 978-1-68579-597-9
6	Seaside Stranger Volume Seven: Harukaze no Étranger; Harukaze no Etoranze (春風のエトランゼ 6)	August 25, 2025; 978-4396786090	September 1, 2026; 979-8-89160-654-8

=== Anime film ===
On October 25, 2019, Fuji TV announced that they were producing an anime film adaptation of L'étranger de la Plage as part of its Blue Lynx boys' love anime label, set for a theatrical release on September 11, 2020. The film was animated by Studio Hibari and directed by Akiyo Ohashi. Kii, who had previously been an animator, supervised the film and was in charge of the character designs. Mina Kubota composed the music for the film, while the band Mono no Aware performed the film's theme song, "Zokkon" (From the Bottom of My Heart). Funimation acquired the rights for the film in North America, United Kingdom, Ireland, Australia, New Zealand, Brazil and Mexico, streaming it on their website from July 9, 2021.

== Reception ==
In 2014, L'étranger de la Plage was ranked #5 on the list of recommended boys' love stories in a survey of 470 employees across 400 bookstores nationwide in Japan. Referring to Kii's experience as an animator, Kozue Aou from Kono Manga ga Sugoi! praised her use of color contrasts, long shots and close-ups of the characters, and camera work that "speaks eloquently about the character's heart."

The second volume of L'étranger du Zéphyr debuted at #48 on Oricon, selling 17,457 copies in its first week. Kozue Aou from Kono Manga ga Sugoi! described the first volume of L'étranger du Zéphyr as "expressive" and a "first-class product" that "reflects the complex emotions of each character", describing Shun and Mio's journey to Hokkaido as having "warmth" that was realistic.

Kim Morrisy of Anime News Network gave the film adaptation a 'B-' rating, and stated "I think that it needed more time to develop its characters, especially Mio, more effectively, but there were tantalizing glimpses of a satisfying love story here." Matt Schley from The Japan Times rated the film 2.5 out of 5, and stated "In adapting the excellent manga, the team behind this film have proved once again that more is less."
