= Paradox Live =

- Origin: Japan
- Genres: Japanese hip hop; anime song
- Years active: 2019–present
- Label: Avex Pictures
- Website: paradoxlive.jp

Paradox Live is a Japanese media mix project created by Avex Pictures and GCREST. The project features 29 voice actors and is centered on rap battles between each faction.

== Summary ==
In the near future, amidst the Hip-Hop culture rises a new movement called "Phantom Live". The rappers create illusions linked to their emotions using chemically reactive accessories that contain a metal called "phantometal" with their own DNA to inspire young people via their performances. Behind the scenes, however, they suffer from "traumatic illusions" as a side effect.

The Paradox Live's story follow four groups who are immensely popular with their respective genres. BAE, The Cat's Whiskers, cozmez and Akan Yatsura (悪漢奴等). They will lead the way to the legendary club called CLUB PARADOX where the mysterious gathering occurs. In order to prove that their own music is the number 1, they participate in battles.

After a disaster that caused the collapse of CLUB PARADOX and prevented the final battle between the winning group and the legendary duo Buraikan (武雷管), the club has been rebuilt with a brand new competition to take place. Four new groups–VISTY, AMPRULE, 1Nm8, and Goku Luck (獄Luck)–have joined the ring alongside the current cast. With different music styles, the music groups try to fight to the top.

== Characters ==
=== BAE ===
BAE are a trio of friends who attend the same international private university. Their songs are upbeat and make use of Japanese, English, and Korean lyrics. The characters were designed by Akane Aki.

Allen Sugasano (朱雀野 アレン, Sugasano Aren)
Voiced by: Gakuto Kajiwara
Allen is 21 years old and uses the rapper name SUZAKU. He is a quarter-Russian and comes from a family with a background in classical and opera music. His parents disapproved of his interest in hip hop to the point of burning his record collection when he was a teenager. He eventually left for university, continuing to follow his passion for hip hop.
Yeon Hajun (燕 夏準, Yon Hajun)
Voiced by: Ayumu Murase
Hajun is 21 years old and uses the rapper name 48 (pronounced yon-pachi). He speaks in a polite manner but can act cold and even cruel. Hajun is South Korean and the illegitimate son of the Yeon family, who owns a large conglomerate. After his parents conceived a legitimate son who could become the heir, he was deemed unnecessary to the family and sent to Japan. Hajun has held a grudge against them since and seeks to take down the conglomerate.
Anne Faulkner (アン・フォークナー, An Fōkunā)
Voiced by: 96neko
Anne is 20 years old and uses the rapper name anZ. They (Note: The characters Anne and Aoi are referred to with they/them pronouns in the official English translation of their character profiles.) are unrestrained by gender and look feminine because of their fashionable appearance. They are half-British and half-Japanese. Anne has an estranged relationship with their mother who suppressed their self-expression to make them the perfect child in her eyes. As such, they heavily value being able to live true to themselves now.

=== The Cat's Whiskers ===
The Cat's Whiskers is a four-person team whose songs combine elements of hip hop and jazz. The members all work at Bar 4/7, owned by the team's leader Naoakira. The characters of The Cat's Whiskers were designed by Kuniharu Komiya.

Naoakira Saimon (西門 直明, Saimon Naoakira)
Voiced by: Ryōta Takeuchi
Naoakira is 34 years old and uses the rapper name Kotonoha (コトノハ). He is a university linguistics professor and owner of Bar 4/7. He has a caring personality which led him to taking in Ryu and Shiki. He was once a member of the successful hip hop group Quadra X (stylized as XXXX) with Yohei and his late wife Tsubaki.
Yohei Kanbayashi (神林 匋平, Kanbayashi Yōhei)
Voiced by: Yū Hayashi
Yohei is 28 years old and uses the rapper name God Summer. He used to be a gang member affiliated with the Suiseki clan and now works as a bartender at Bar 4/7. He has known Naoakira and his late wife for many years, and he looks after Ryu and Shiki with him.
Ryu Natsume (棗 リュウ, Natsume Ryū)
Voiced by: Natsuki Hanae
Ryu claims to be 800 years old and uses the rapper name Conpla Daimaō (コンプラ大魔王). He is an eccentric individual who works as a bartender-in-training, though the drinks he mixes are bizarre and unpalatable. Oddly, he does not suffer from the phantometal's side effects of traumatic illusions.
Shiki Ando (闇堂 四季, Andō Shiki)
Voiced by: Junta Terashima
Shiki is 17 years old and uses the rapper name MC Nanashi (MC名無し). He is a high schooler and works as bar hall staff at Bar 4/7. Shiki is kind and musically talented, yet timid and insecure. He looks up to Naoakira and Yohei and is good friends with Ryu despite his eccentric behavior.

=== Cozmez ===
Cozmez (stylized in all lowercase) is a duo consisting of the Yatonokami twins Kanata and Nayuta. Their songs are mainly trap music, with their lyrics often revolving around the hardships of their childhood and living in the slums. In 2021, Cozmez was declared the winning team of the original Paradox Live competition. The characters were designed by Kinako.

Kanata Yatonokami (矢戸乃上 珂波汰, Yatonokami Kanata)
Voiced by: Yūsuke Kobayashi
Kanata is 19 years old and uses the rapper name Kanata (in romaji). He is the older twin and is extremely protective of Nayuta. Because he grew up around abusive adults, he is distrustful and hardly cares for anyone besides Nayuta. Along with rapping, he made money by taking up shady jobs from Iori.
Nayuta Yatanokami (矢戸乃上 那由汰, Yatonokami Nayuta)
Voiced by: Toshiyuki Toyonaga
Nayuta is 19 years old and uses the rapper name Nayuta (in romaji). He is the younger twin and has relied on Kanata since childhood because of his weak constitution. It is revealed that in the past, Nayuta partook in phantometal experiments for money, which caused him to develop a condition called metal erosion that affected his health. Feeling he would burden Kanata with his condition, he attempted suicide by jumping off of a building. Nayuta survived but fell into a coma. He was taken in by Alter Trigger, the organization who experimented on him, and the Nayuta shown in the series prior is revealed to be a phantom that Kanata created subconsciously. By the time Cozmez wins Paradox Live, the real Nayuta has woken up from his coma and reunites with Kanata and Shiki, who he had befriended before the incident.

=== Akanyatsura ===
Akanyatsura (悪漢奴等) is a five-person group whose members are associated with the Suiseki clan, a yakuza group. They consider each other family. Their songs are mainly dance-floor related, using elements of street urban and/or international instrumentals. The characters were designed by Harada.

Iori Suiseki (翠石 依織, Suiseki Iori)
Voiced by: Takayuki Kondō
Iori is 28 years old and uses the rapper name Kashira (カシラ). He owns a hostess club called CLUB CANDY. After an incident where many members of the Suiseki clan, including the previous leader, were killed, Iori vows to find the people behind the attack and avenge the deceased members. He cares greatly for his team, with the younger members viewing him as a big brother figure, and he keeps a cheerful persona to hide his more calculating side.
Zen Gaho (雅邦 善, Gahō Zen)
Voiced by: Shima
Zen is 27 years old and uses the rapper name Gazen (俄然). He was formerly a police officer and now works at CLUB CANDY. He acts as Iori's right-hand man and cares for the younger members of Akanyatsura with him. He is passionate about exercise and is easily moved to tears.
Hokusai Masaki (征木 北斎, Masaki Hokusai)
Voiced by: Shun'ichi Toki
Hokusai is 24 years old and uses the rapper name Fūrai Boy (風来BOY). He appears tall, mysterious, and stoic, but he is actually a gentle and kind-hearted young man who loves animals, especially cats. Because his father was arrested for murder when Hokusai was young, he had a lonely and tumultuous childhood where he was bullied and eventually became homeless. He was taken in by Iori when he was 18 and has lived with Akanyatsura since. He attends high school as a part-time student in the evening.
Satsuki Ito (伊藤 紗月, Itō Satsuki)
Voiced by: Tasuku Hatanaka
Satsuki is 19 years old and uses the rapper name Gaia (臥威亜). He is hot-headed and gullible, but extremely loyal to the people he cares for. When he was younger, he had trouble with studying and often fought with other children, being deemed an uncontrollable problem child by his parents and teachers. He was sent to juvenile reform after an incident where he was betrayed by an old friend, and was discharged later on only to find his family had abandoned him. Satsuki was taken in by the Suiseki clan when he was 16 and has lived with them since. He attends high school as a part-time student in the evening. He also has a crush on Anne, unaware that they are not a woman.
Reo Maruyama (円山 玲央, Maruyama Reo)
Voiced by: Shōgo Yano
Reo is 17 years old and uses the rapper name Reo-kun (REOくん). As the youngest member, he enjoys being spoiled and often uses his cute appearance to his advantage. He originally belonged to a rich family, though his father lived a debaucherous life and disappeared one day, leaving behind a massive debt. At 14, he was saved by Iori and joined the Suiseki clan to erase his debt. He has lived with them since. He attends high school as a part-time student in the evening.

=== Buraikan ===
Buraikan (武雷管) is a legendary hip hop duo that had gone mysteriously underground for about a decade before the beginning of the main story. Their songs are mainly throwback music, stemming from the late 90s/early 00s. The characters were designed by Suoh.

Chisei Kuzuryu (九頭竜 智生, Kuzuryu Chisei)
Voiced by: Kensho Ono
Chisei uses the rapper name Yasha (夜叉). He is able to create powerful phantoms despite having no trauma.
Haruomi Shingu (辰宮 晴臣, Shingu Haruomi)
Voiced by: Junichi Suwabe
Haruomi is 36 years old and uses the rapper name Shura (修羅). He is the group's trackmaker. He also owns Raimentei, a ramen shop that many of the characters frequent visit.

=== VISTY ===
VISTY is a four-member idol group struggling with their falling popularity due to their center member leaving. Their songs have mixed hip-hop. The characters were designed by Kazari Tayu.

Shogo Yamato (大和 憧吾, Yamato Shogo)
Voiced by: Yoshiki Nakajima
Shogo is 20 years old and uses the rapper name SHOGO. He is the leader of VISTY and struggles with being in the shadow of his father, a famous actor. He likes sweets and enjoys trying new flavors of gummies.
Toma Hikage (緋景 斗真, Hikage Toma)
Voiced by: Kashitaro Ito
Toma is 21 years old and uses the rapper name TOMA. Along with being a member of VISTY, he is a university student and model. He enjoys cosmetics and has a passion for beauty.
Aoi Kureha (呉羽 葵, Kureha Aoi)
Voiced by: Aimi
Aoi is 16 years old and uses the rapper name AOI. Aoi has a mature nature, putting on a prince-like persona for VISTY's fans. They have a strong admiration towards Anne.
Kantaro Misuji (三洲寺 甘太郎, Misuji Kantarō)
Voiced by: Tetsuei Sumiya
Kantaro is 17 years old and uses the rapper name KANTARO. He is the group's trackmaker and has a lively persona. He is dependent on validation from social media and egosurfs often.

=== AMPRULE ===
AMPRULE is a master-servant duo consisting of Hajun's half-brother, Dongha, who desires to destroy him in the upcoming competition, and Chunsung, the Yeon family butler who pledges absolute allegiance to Dongha. Their songs have a high-class atmosphere, but with negative lyrics. The characters were designed by Uri.

Yeon Dongha (燕 東夏, Yon Donha)
Voiced by: Marina Inoue
Dongha is 14 years old and uses the rapper name lil EMPERA. He is Hajun's younger half-brother and the legitimate heir of the Yeon conglomerate. He seeks to crush Hajun in the competition. Dongha is highly disciplined and has an arrogant attitude, but he struggles with an inferiority complex and vies for his father's attention.
Baek Chungsung (白 忠成, Beku Chunson)
Voiced by: Ryōtarō Okiayu
Chungsung is 28 years old and uses the rapper name BATTLER. He is the family butler to the Yeon family and is heavily devoted to Dongha. He is a masochist and enjoys being punished.

=== 1Nm8 ===
1Nm8 (pronounced inmate) is a three-member unit who all live under the same roof together. Their songs consist of pure, synth-pop. The characters were designed by Hou.

Kei Miyama (御山 京, Miyama Kei)
Voiced by: Amatsuki
Kei is 19 years old and uses the rapper name 7. He formerly held the center role of VISTY, but left the group. His goal is to put an end to the phantom lives.
Itsuki (イツキ, Itsuki)
Voiced by: Ryo Kitamura
Itsuki is 17 years old and uses the rapper name 5. He was formerly a subject of human experimentation, giving him an ability called "Shutter Eye", which appears to give him photographic memory. He is reserved with his emotions.
Rokuta (ロクタ, Rokuta)
Voiced by: Shōya Chiba
Rokuta is 17 years old and uses the rapper name 6. He was formerly a subject of human experimentation. As a result, he has gained the ability of super strength and has no memories before being a test subject. He is energetic, friendly, and loves eating karaage.

=== Goku Luck ===
Goku Luck (獄Luck) is a four-member group consisting of a prison guard and three prisoners. They specialize in punk-rock. The characters were designed by Lack.

Yuto Inukai (犬飼 憂人, Inukai Yuto)
Voiced by: Makoto Furukawa
Yuto is 32 years old and uses the rapper name HANCHO. He is an ex-mercenary and currently works as a prison guard. He may have a courteous, unreliable persona on the surface, but he has an alternate, more aggressive personality that comes out on stage and when provoked. However, he doesn't know what the alternative personality does behind the main personality's back, leaving him worried.
Ryoga Tosa (土佐 凌牙, Tosa Ryōga)
Voiced by: Shogo Batori
Ryoga is 23 years old and uses the rapper name PITBULL. He was formerly a gang member and is now in prison. He has trouble communicating and is shown to have a stutter. It may be implied that he has a learning disability.
Shion Kaida (甲斐田 紫音, Kaida Shion)
Voiced by: Shinnosuke Tachibana
Shion is 22 years old and uses the rapper name smokin'dog. He is a prisoner and flirtatious hedonist who enjoys smoking and drinking. He has never been seriously committed to anyone. However, he secretly longs for connection. A strange 'skin condition' of his, which causes him to have strange appearance, has led him to be outcast by others.
Kenta Mikoshiba (御子柴 賢太, Mikoshiba Kenta)
Voiced by: Chiaki Kobayashi
Kenta is 15 years old and uses the rapper name anonymous. He is a hacker and prisoner. He is sharp-tongued and enjoys provoking others. However, having been locked up since childhood under the excuse of 'special government protection' has left him bitter towards wider society. Because of his mocking personality, this is not immediately apparent to the listener.

== Discography ==
=== Singles ===
List of singles, with selected chart positions, sales figures and certifications
| Title | Year | Peak chart positions | Sales | Album |
| Title | Year | JPN | Sales | Album |
|---|---|---|---|---|
| Paradox Live Opening Show | 2020 | 6 | JPN: 15,424 | Non-album singles |
| Paradox Live Stage Battle "Desire" | 2020 | 7 | JPN: 9,242 | Non-album singles |
| Paradox Live Stage Battle "Justice" | 2020 | 4 | TBA | Non-album singles |
| Paradox Live Stage Battle "Pride" | 2020 | 11 | TBA | Non-album singles |
| Paradox Live Stage Battle "Family" | 2020 | 10 | TBA | Non-album singles |
| Paradox Live Exhibition Show: Akan Yatsura | 2020 | 12 | TBA | Non-album singles |
| Paradox Live Exhibition Show: Cozmez | 2020 | 12 | TBA | Non-album singles |
| Paradox Live Exhibition Show: The Cat's Whiskers | 2020 | 12 | TBA | Non-album singles |
| Paradox Live Exhibition Show: BAE | 2020 | 12 | TBA | Non-album singles |
| Paradox Live Stage Battle "Love" | 2021 | 14 | TBA | Non-album singles |
| Paradox Live Stage Battle "Vibes" | 2021 | 22 | TBA | Non-album singles |
"—" denotes releases that did not chart or were not released in that region.

=== Albums ===
List of albums, with selected chart positions, sales figures and certifications
| Title | Year | Peak chart positions | Sales |
| Title | Year | JPN | Sales |
|---|---|---|---|
| Paradox Live 1st Album "Trap" | 2021 | 9 | |
| Paradox Live 2nd Album "Live" | 2021 | 15 | |
| Paradox Live Shuffle Team Show Vol.1 | 2021 | 24 | |
| Paradox Live Shuffle Team Show Vol.2 | 2021 | 24 | |
| Paradox Live Opening Show -Road to Legend- | 2022 | 10 | |
| Paradox Live -Road to Legend- Round1 "FATE" | 2022 | 23 | |
| Paradox Live -Road to Legend- Round1 "RAGE" | 2022 | 12 | |
| Paradox Live -Road to Legend- Consolation Match "Showdown" | 2023 | TBA | |
"—" denotes releases that did not chart or were not released in that region.

=== Video albums ===
List of albums, with selected chart positions, sales figures and certifications
| Title | Year | Peak chart positions | | Sales |
| Title | Year | JPN DVD | JPN Blu-ray | Sales |
|---|---|---|---|---|
| Paradox Live Dope Show-2021.3.20 LINE CUBE SHIBUYA- | 2021 | 10 | 19 | |
| Butai 「Paradox Live on Stage」 | 2022 | — | — | |
| Paradox Live Dope Show-2022.5.28 PACIFICO Yokohama National Convention Hall | 2022 | 14 | 14 | |
"—" denotes releases that did not chart or were not released in that region.

=== Other charted songs ===
| Title | Year | Peak chart positions | | Sales | Album |
| Title | Year | JPN Hot | JPN Ani. | Sales | Album |
|---|---|---|---|---|---|
| "BaNG!!!" | 2020 | 43 | 9 | JPN: 1,594 (download & streaming) | Non-album single |
| "AmBitious!!!" | 2020 | 80 | 12 | — | Non-album single |
"—" denotes releases that did not chart or were not released in that region.

== Anime ==
- Paradox Live: The Animation
- Anime television series
- Directed by: Naoya Ando
- Written by: Takayo Ikami
- Music by: Taku Iwasaki
- Studio: Pine Jam
- Licensed by: Crunchyroll: SEA: Plus Media Networks Asia
- Original network: Tokyo MX, BS Fuji, Animax
- Original run: October 3, 2023 – December 26, 2023
- Episodes: 12
- Anime film

Paradox Live: The Movie
- Studio: Studio Graph77
- Released: 2027

At the end of the Paradox Live 2nd dope show live concert, it was announced that the project would receive an anime television series adaptation titled Paradox Live: The Animation. It is produced by Pine Jam and directed by Naoya Ando, with scripts written by Takayo Ikami, character designs handled by Koji Haneda, and music composed by Taku Iwasaki. The cast will reprise their roles in the series. The series premiered on October 3, 2023, on Tokyo MX and other networks. The opening theme song is "Rise Up" by the groups BAE, The Cat's Whiskers, Cozmez, and Akan Yatsura, while the ending theme song is "Every Day Every Night" by the group Buraikan. Crunchyroll licensed the series outside of Asia. Aniplus Asia licensed the series in Southeast Asia. while Deep has licensed it for Russia. (Note: Russia is the only country which made a full dubbing of the series with all songs being dubbed as well.)

An anime film titled Paradox Live: The Movie, produced by Studio Graph77 was announced during the "Paradox Live Dope Show 2026" event on May 31, 2026. It is set to open in Japanese theaters in 2027.
