= Given the Movie (2020 film) =

2020 film by Hikaru Yamaguchi

- Theatrical release poster
- Kanji: 映画 ギヴン
- Revised Hepburn: Eiga Givun
- Directed by: Hikaru Yamaguchi
- Screenplay by: Yuniko Ayana
- Based on: Given by Natsuki Kizu
- Produced by: Miho Matsumoto; Yuka Okayasu
- Starring: Shōgo Yano; Yuma Uchida; Masatomo Nakazawa; Takuya Eguchi; Shintarō Asanuma
- Cinematography: Naoki Serizawa
- Edited by: Rie Itō
- Music by: Michiru
- Production company: Lerche
- Distributed by: Aniplex
- Release date: August 22, 2020
- Running time: 59 minutes
- Country: Japan
- Language: Japanese

Given the Movie (Japanese: 映画 ギヴン, Hepburn: Eiga Givun; stylized in all lowercase) is a 2020 Japanese animated romantic drama film directed by Hikaru Yamaguchi and written by Yuniko Ayana based on a manga of the same name by Natsuki Kizu. Produced by Lerche and distributed by Aniplex, it adapts the second story arc of the manga, as well as taking place after the events of the anime series, focusing on the relationship between Haruki and Akihiko. The film stars the voices of Shōgo Yano, Yuma Uchida, Masatomo Nakazawa, Takuya Eguchi and Shintarō Asanuma. It was released in Japan on August 22, 2020.

The film was licensed by Crunchyroll, and was streamed on its website on February 2, 2021. A sequel two-part film was released in Japan in 2024, with the first film, Hiiragi mix on January 27, and the second film, To the Sea on September 20.

== Synopsis ==
The film follows the members of the band Given as they navigate complex emotions and shifting relationships. Haruki Nakayama, the bassist, struggles with feelings for their drummer, Akihiko Kaji, who is still entangled in a difficult past relationship. As the band prepares for a significant live performance, tensions rise, and the power of music becomes a key force for expressing what words cannot. Throughout this journey, the characters confront their personal struggles and begin to find clarity and hope, both in their connections with each other and similar passion for music.

== Voice cast ==
- Shōgo Yano as Mafuyu Satō
- Yuma Uchida as Ritsuka Uenoyama
- Masatomo Nakazawa as Haruki Nakayama
- Takuya Eguchi as Akihiko Kaji
- Shintarō Asanuma as Ugetsu Murata

== Production ==
In September 2019, it was announced that a sequel film of Given anime television series was in the works by adapting the second story arc of the manga. The key staff and cast members reprised their respective roles for the film. Fuji TV's new boys' love (yaoi) anime label, Blue Lynx handled the development of the film. The key staff, including director Hikaru Yamaguchi expressed their gratitude for the film.

== Release ==
The film was scheduled to release in theaters in Japan on May 16, 2020, but was postponed to August 22, 2020, due to COVID-19 pandemic. Crunchyroll acquired the international distribution rights for the film, and streamed on its website on February 2, 2021. In Southeast Asia, WeTV released the film on May 25, 2021.

== Reception ==
=== Box office ===
The film opened at number 9 out of top 10 in the Japanese box office in its opening weekend, and later dropped off from the charts in its second weekend.

=== Critical reception ===
Kim Morrisy of Anime News Network gave the film a solid "B" rating, and stated: "Overall, I will say that I was satisfied with this continuation, even if I didn't like it quite as much as the original series".

== Sequel ==
A two-part sequel film was released in Japan in 2024, with the first film, Hiiragi Mix, on January 27, and the second film, To the Sea on September 20.
