= List of anime directors =

This is a list of notable anime directors. Romanized names are written in Western order (given names before family names), whereas kanji names are written in Japanese order (family names before given names).

== Individuals ==
=== A ===
- Masashi Ando (安藤 雅司)
- Hideaki Anno (庵野 秀明)
- Ei Aoki (あおき えい)
- Morio Asaka (浅香 守生)

=== D ===
- Osamu Dezaki (出﨑 統)

=== H ===
- Keiichi Hara (原 恵一)
- Mamoru Hosoda (細田 守)

=== I ===
- Kunihiko Ikuhara (幾原 邦彦)
- Tomoyuki Itamura (板村 智幸)
- Atsuko Ishizuka (いしづか あつこ)

=== K ===
- Sunao Katabuchi (片渕 須直)
- Yoshiaki Kawajiri (川尻 善昭)
- Shōji Kawamori (河森 正治)
- Osamu Kobayashi (小林 治)
- Satoshi Kon (今 敏)

=== M ===
- Kōichi Mashimo (真下 耕一)
- Tsutomu Mizushima (水島 努)
- Hayao Miyazaki (宮崎 駿)
- Takeshi Mori (もりたけし)

=== N ===
- Shingo Natsume (夏目 真悟)
- Yoshinobu Nishizaki (西崎 義展)

=== O ===
- Mari Okada (岡田 麿里)
- Shinichi Omata (小俣 真一)
- Shin Oonuma (大沼 心)
- Mamoru Oshii (押井 守)
- Katsuhiro Otomo (大友 克洋)

=== R ===
- Rintaro (りんたろう)

=== S ===
- Junichi Sato (佐藤 順一)
- Akiyuki Shinbo (新房 昭之)
- Makoto Shinkai (新海 誠)

=== T ===
- Isao Takahata (高畑 勲)
- Yoshiyuki Tomino (富野 由悠季)

=== U ===
- Hiroko Utsumi (内海 紘子)

=== Y ===
- Naoko Yamada (山田 尚子)
- Masaaki Yuasa (湯浅 政明)

== See also ==
- List of Japanese animation studios
