= Visual Prison =

2021 Japanese anime television series

- Key visual

ヴィジュアルプリズン (Vijuaru Purizun)
- Genre: Supernatural, music
- Created by: Noriyasu Agematsu (Elements Garden)
- Anime television series
- Directed by: Jouji Furuta (Chief); Tomoya Tanaka
- Produced by: Hideo Itou; Shuko Yokoyama
- Written by: Yukie Sugawara
- Music by: Elements Garden
- Studio: A-1 Pictures
- Licensed by: Funimation
- Original network: Tokyo MX, GTV, GYT, BS11, ABC TV, Mētele, WOWOW
- Original run: October 9, 2021 – December 25, 2021
- Episodes: 12

Visual Prison (Japanese: ヴィジュアルプリズン, Hepburn: Vijuaru Purizun) is an original Japanese anime television series produced by A-1 Pictures. The series aired from October to December 2021.

== Premise ==
In the story, vampires masquerade as visual kei musicians. Once a year, they gather together in Harajuku at an event known as "Visual Prison". When Ange Yuki travels to Harajuku to see his favorite act, he witnesses a musical battle between the bands Eclipse and Lost Eden.

== Characters ==
=== Oz ===
Ange Yuki (結希アンジュ, Yuki Anju)
Voiced by: Shōya Chiba
Guiltia Brion (ギルティア・ブリオン, Girutia Burion)
Voiced by: Makoto Furukawa
Eve Louise (イヴ・ルイーズ, Ivu Ruīzu)
Voiced by: Hiroki Nanami
Robin Laffite (ロビン・ラフィット, Robin Rafitto)
Voiced by: Shun Horie

=== Lost Eden ===
Saga Latour (サガ・ラトゥール, Saga Ratoūru)
Voiced by: Takuya Eguchi
Mist Flaive (ミスト・フレーヴ, Misuto Furēvu)
Voiced by: Nobunaga Shimazaki
Veuve Elizabeth (ヴーヴ・エリザベス, Vūvu Erizabesu)
Voiced by: Takuma Nagatsuka
Jack Mouton (ジャック・ムートン, Jakku Mūton)
Voiced by: Shōgo Yano

=== Eclipse ===
Dmitri Romanee (ディミトリ・ロマネ, Dimitori Romane)
Voiced by: Toshiki Masuda
Hyde Jayer (ハイド・ジャイエ, Haido Jaie)
Voiced by: Shouta Aoi

=== Mascot ===
Panya (パンニャ, Pannya)
Voiced by: Tomokazu Sugita
Despite his color and name, Panya is in fact, a cat. He lives around Harajuku.

== Production and release ==
Visual Prison official logo

The anime project was announced during Aniplex's panel at AnimeJapan 2021. The series is created by Noriyasu Agematsu and animated by A-1 Pictures. Elements Garden composes the series' music, while Ikumi Katagiri takes charge of the original character designs. Tomoya Tanaka is directing the series, with Jouji Furuta serving as chief director, Yukie Sugawara penning the series' scripts, and Minako Shiba designing the characters. It aired from October 9 to December 25, 2021, on Tokyo MX and other channels. The band Oz performed the series' opening theme song "Zankoku Shangri-la", while the band Lost Eden performed the series' ending theme song "Bloody Kiss". Funimation licensed the series outside of Asia.

=== Episode list ===
No.	Title	Directed by	Written by	Storyboarded by	Original release date
1	"Guilty Cross"; Transliteration: "Giruti † Kurosu" (Japanese: ギルティ†クロス)	Tsuyoshi Tobita	Yukie Sugawara	Takeshi Furuta	October 9, 2021
2	"Charme's Metempsychosis"; Transliteration: "Sharumu no Rinne" (Japanese: シャルムの輪廻)	Aya Ikeda	Yukie Sugawara	Tomoya Tanaka	October 16, 2021
3	"AI=ZO"	Yuki Watanabe	Yukie Sugawara	Shinichi Omata	October 23, 2021
4	"Nemesis"	Takayuki Kikuchi	Hitomi Ogawa, Yukie Sugawara	Takayuki Kikuchi	October 30, 2021
5	"Wing with wind"	Takahiro Tanaka	Yukie Sugawara	Kagetsu Aizawa	November 6, 2021
6	"Shangri-La of Cruelty"; Transliteration: "Zankoku Shangurira" (Japanese: 残酷シャングリラ)	Kudaka Wakabori	Daisuke Watanabe	Toshinori Watanabe	November 13, 2021
7	"My Principal"	Tsuyoshi Tobita	Daisuke Watanabe	Tsuyoshi Tobita	November 20, 2021
8	"Galaxy Tiara"; Transliteration: "Ginga Tiara" (Japanese: 銀河ティアラ)	Yuki Watanabe	Yukie Sugawara, Daisuke Watanabe	Kagetsu Aizawa	November 27, 2021
9	"ROYAL CROWN"	Aya Ikeda	Yukie Sugawara	Aya Ikeda	December 4, 2021
10	"K or K"	Mizu Watanabe	Yukie Sugawara	Tomoyuki Munehiro	December 11, 2021
11	"SKY"	Shōtarō Kitamura	Yukie Sugawara	Shōtarō Kitamura	December 18, 2021
12	"ANGELIST"	Aya Ikeda	Yukie Sugawara	Tomoya Tanaka	December 25, 2021
