= Twittering Birds Never Fly =

Japanese manga series by Kou Yoneda

- Cover of the first volume of the manga series

囀る鳥は羽ばたかない (Saezuru Tori wa Habatakanai)
- Genre: Boys' love
- Manga
- Written by: Kou Yoneda
- Published by: Taiyoh Tosho
- English publisher: NA: Juné (Digital Manga)
- Imprint: H&C Comics ihr HertZ Series
- Magazine: ihr HertZ (formerly HertZ)
- Original run: August 1, 2011 – present
- Volumes: 9
- Audio drama
- Studio: Frontier Works
- Original run: October 23, 2013 – present
- Anime film

Twittering Birds Never Fly – The Clouds Gather
- Directed by: Kaori Makita
- Written by: Hiroshi Seko
- Music by: H ZETTRIO
- Studio: Grizzly
- Licensed by: NA: Sentai Filmworks
- Released: February 15, 2020
- Runtime: 85 minutes
- Original animation DVD

Don't Stay Gold
- Directed by: Kaori Makita
- Written by: Hiroshi Seko
- Music by: H ZETTRIO
- Studio: Grizzly
- Licensed by: NA: Sentai Filmworks (HIDIVE)
- Released: March 1, 2021
- Runtime: 24 minutes
- Anime film

Twittering Birds Never Fly – The Storm Breaks
- Studio: Grizzly
- Licensed by: NA: Sentai Filmworks
- Anime film

Untitled film
- Licensed by: NA: Sentai Filmworks

Twittering Birds Never Fly (Japanese: 囀る鳥は羽ばたかない, Hepburn: Saezuru Tori wa Habatakanai) is a Japanese manga series written and illustrated by Kou Yoneda. A sequel to Yoneda's previous one-shot stories Don't Stay Gold (2008) and Though They Drift, They Do Not Sink, But Nor Do They Sing (2009), it has been serialized in the boys' love (BL) manga magazine ihr HertZ, formerly known as HertZ, since August 2011. The manga was adapted into an anime film trilogy produced by Blue Lynx and animated by Grizzly beginning in 2020. It also inspired an original animation DVD (OAD) adaptation of Don't Stay Gold and an ongoing audio drama produced by Frontier Works.

== Synopsis ==
The series follows Yashiro, a young, high-ranking yakuza boss and president of a front corporation. He is assigned a new bodyguard, Chikara Doumeki, who discovers that his employer is a hypersexual masochist. Yashiro develops an attraction to Doumeki, who rejects his advances. Yashiro later discovers that Doumeki is impotent. The two slowly fall in love, but must fight through their own trauma and the hyper-masculine yakuza world if they hope to be together.

== Characters ==
Yashiro (矢代)
Voiced by: Tarusuke Shingaki (audio drama, film)
A high-ranking yakuza boss. While outwardly demanding but cheerful, he is secretly a sadomasochist who was sexually abused as a child by his step-father. He has difficulty in maintaining close personal relationships with others.
Chikara Doumeki (百目鬼 力, Dōmeki Chikara)
Voiced by: Wataru Hatano (audio drama, film)
Yashiro's personal bodyguard. Formerly a police officer, he was forced to leave after going to prison. He became Yashiro's bodyguard to earn more money. He is handsome and stoic, but suffers from sexual impotence.
Kanji Kageyama (影山 莞爾, Kageyama Kanji)
Voiced by: Hiroki Yasumoto (audio drama, film)
Yashiro's friend since high school. A doctor, he runs his clinic as a legitimate business during the day but tends to Yashiro's wounded underlings at night. He has a sexual fetish for scars and scabs.
Eishin Kuga (久我 瑛心, Kuga Eishin)
Voiced by: Yūki Ono (audio drama, film)
A 22-year-old former delinquent who grew up in a juvenile institution. His chest is covered in burn scars from his abusive childhood.
Takahito Misumi (三角 隆仁, Misumi Takahito)
Voiced by: Tōru Ōkawa (audio drama, film)
Yashiro's boss, mentor, and former lover.
Atsushi Ryuuzaki (竜崎 篤士, Ryūzaki Atsushi)
Voiced by: Kenta Miyake (audio drama, film)
The boss of the Matsubara yakuza.
Kazuaki Hirata (平田 和明, Hirata Kazuaki)
Voiced by: Akimitsu Takase (audio drama, film)
The boss of the Shinseikai yakuza.
Yuusuke Nanahara (七原 祐輔, Nanahara Yūsuke)
Voiced by: Kazuyuki Okitsu (audio drama, film)
Yashiro's subordinate.
Hayato Sugimoto (杉本 隼人, Sugimoto Hayato)
Voiced by: Takahiro Miyake (audio drama, film)
Yashiro's subordinate.
Shizuma Amou (天羽 静真, Amō Shizuma)
Voiced by: Takuya Satō (audio drama, film)
Misumi's personal secretary.
Tsunakawa (綱川)
Voiced by: Yōji Ueda (audio drama)

== Media ==
=== Manga ===
Twittering Birds Never Fly has been serialized in the boys' love (BL) manga magazine ihr HertZ, formerly known as HertZ, since August 1, 2011. In Japan, the series has been collected into seven tankōbon volumes published by Taiyoh Tosho as of March 1, 2021. The first volume includes two prequel one-shot stories by Yoneda: Don't Stay Gold, originally published in the BL manga magazine Drap on March 31, 2008, depicting the relationship between Kuga and Kageyama; and Though They Drift, They Do Not Sink, But Nor Do They Sing (漂えど沈まず、されど泣きもせず, Tadayoedo Shizumazu, Saredo Naki mo Sezu), originally published in HertZ on June 1, 2009, chronicling Yashiro's teen years and his friendship with Kageyama in high school. A limited edition of the series' fourth volume was packaged with a bonus manga booklet, Distant Flame (遠火, Tōbi), revealing Doumeki's first encounter with Yashiro prior to becoming his underling.

In North America, an English-language translation of the first three volumes of the series was published by Juné, the BL imprint of Digital Manga, from 2014 to 2017. After a three-year hiatus, the fourth volume was published digitally on December 4, 2020, and in print on January 12, 2021. The fifth and sixth volumes were published by Juné in late 2021. Twittering Birds Never Fly has also been translated into Chinese by Sharp Point Press, French by Taifu Comics, German by Manga Cult, Italian by Flashbook Edizioni, Korean by Ruvill, Polish by Wydawnictwo Kotori, and Spanish by Ediciones Tomodomo.

No.	Original release date	Original ISBN	English release date	English ISBN
1	January 30, 2013	978-4-8130-3013-3	September 24, 2014	978-1-56970-327-4
2	November 1, 2013	978-4-8130-3034-8	January 28, 2015	978-1-56970-336-6
3	June 1, 2015	978-4-8130-3080-5	March 21, 2017	978-1-56970-362-5
4	September 30, 2016	978-4-8130-3219-9 (standard); 978-4-8130-3127-7 (limited)	December 4, 2020 (digital); January 12, 2021 (print)	978-1-56970-389-2
5	November 30, 2017	978-4-8130-3168-0	September 17, 2021 (digital); October 26, 2021 (print)	978-1-56970-387-8
6	May 1, 2019	978-4-8130-3220-5	November 16, 2021 (digital); December 13, 2021 (print)	978-1-56970-388-5
7	March 1, 2021	978-4-8130-3278-6 (standard); 978-4-8130-4024-8 (limited)	January 3, 2023	978-1-5697-0408-0
8	March 1, 2023	978-4-8130-3340-0		
9	October 1, 2024	978-4-8130-3398-1 (standard); 978-4-8130-4027-9 (limited)		

=== Audio drama ===
An audio drama adaptation of Twittering Birds Never Fly has been produced by Frontier Works since 2013, featuring Tarusuke Shingaki as the voice of Yashiro and Wataru Hatano as the voice of Doumeki.

Title	Release date	JAN
Twittering Birds Never Fly	October 23, 2013	JAN 4562207987875
Twittering Birds Never Fly Volume 2	September 24, 2014	JAN 4571436893420
Twittering Birds Never Fly Volume 3	January 27, 2016	JAN 4571436907950
Twittering Birds Never Fly Volume 4	February 8, 2017	JAN 4571436926807
Twittering Birds Never Fly Volume 5	February 28, 2018	JAN 4571436945174
Twittering Birds Never Fly Volume 6	February 21, 2020	JAN 4589644719548
Twittering Birds Never Fly Volume 7	July 28, 2021	JAN 4589644770587
Twittering Birds Never Fly Volume 8	August 23, 2023	JAN 4589644787424
Twittering Birds Never Fly Volume 9	April 23, 2025	JAN 4580798278790

=== Anime films ===
An anime film adaptation, Twittering Birds Never Fly – The Clouds Gather, was announced on April 26, 2019, and released on February 15, 2020. The film is animated by Grizzly and produced by Blue Lynx. The film's primary production staff includes Kaori Makita as director and Hiroshi Seko as scriptwriter; the film's score is composed by piano trio band H ZETTRIO. A sequel film, Twittering Birds Never Fly – The Storm Breaks, was announced on February 15, 2020. An as-of-yet untitled third Twittering Birds Never Fly film has also been announced. However, the future of the films is unknown as the studio Grizzly dissolved on February 20, 2025.

The three films were licensed in English by Sentai Filmworks for theater bookings, virtual screenings, and home video releases in North America. The first film, The Clouds Gather, was released on Blu-ray on February 2, 2021.

=== Original anime DVD ===
An original anime DVD (OAD) adapting Don't Stay Gold was announced on February 15, 2020. It was packaged with a special edition of the seventh volume of the manga series on March 1, 2021. The OAD was licensed in English by Sentai Filmworks and began streaming on HIDIVE on September 10, 2021.

== Reception ==
Over 1.5 million copies of Twittering Birds Never Fly are in print in Japan as of February 2020.

In 2014, Twittering Birds Never Fly was listed as a top recommended boys' love (BL) title in a national survey of Japanese bookstore employees. The manga was shortlisted for the Sugoi Japan Award 2016.
