= Blue Lynx =

Japanese anime label

- Type: Division
- Industry: Anime
- Founded: April 22, 2019; 7 years ago
- Key people: Yuka Okayasu (producer)
- Products: Yaoi anime
- Owner: Fuji Television
- Website: bluelynx-label.com

Blue Lynx (Japanese: ブルーリンクス) is a Japanese anime label and subsidiary of Fuji TV. Founded in 2019, the label produces boys' love (yaoi) anime films exclusively.

== History ==
Development of Blue Lynx began in 2017 through the efforts of Yuka Okayasu, a producer at Fuji TV who previously worked on the network's Noitamina anime programming block. After noting that Fuji TV's existing programming blocks Noitamina and +Ultra seek to appeal to a broad audience of anime viewers, she sought to develop a label that would conversely appeal to a niche audience of yaoi fans. Development of the label was aided by the critical and commercial success of the live-action boys' love television dramas Ossan's Love on TV Asahi and Pornographer on Fuji TV on Demand (FOD), which demonstrated the popularity of the genre to executives at Fuji. As the sexual content of yaoi manga is necessarily limited in television anime adaptations due to broadcast standards and practices, it was determined that Blue Lynx would produce anime film adaptations exclusively.

Blue Lynx was announced on April 22, 2019, through Twitter, with an announcement that the first project of the label would be revealed on April 26, 2019. Gekkou wa Kimi no Sasayaki (Moonlight is Your Whisper), a five-part short story by Shion Miura with illustrations by Yoko Tanji, was posted on the studio's Twitter and website in the days leading up to the announcement. Its first production, a film adaptation of the manga Twittering Birds Never Fly, was announced on April 26, 2019, by Grizzly.

The label's title is a reference to "BL", the acronym for boys' love, as well as a reference to blue ocean vs. red ocean marketing theory, in regards to the untapped potential of the boys' love market.

== Titles ==
No	Title	Director	Release date	Format	Studio	Notes
1	Twittering Birds Never Fly – The Clouds Gather	Kaori Makita	February 15, 2020	Theatrical film	Grizzly	Based on a manga by Kou Yoneda.
2	Given the Movie	Hikaru Yamaguchi	August 22, 2020 (Note: Originally scheduled for May 16, 2020; delayed to August 22, 2020 due to the COVID-19 pandemic.)	Theatrical film	Lerche	Based on a manga by Natsuki Kizu; sequel to an anime television series that aired on Noitamina.
3	The Stranger by the Shore	Akiyo Ohashi	September 11, 2020	Theatrical film	Studio Hibari	Based on a manga by Kanna Kii.
4	Don't Stay Gold	Kaori Makita	March 1, 2021	OAD	Grizzly	Prequel to Twittering Birds Never Fly – The Clouds Gather.
5	Given: On the Other Hand	Akiyo Ohashi	December 1, 2021	OAD	Lerche	Sequel to Given.
6	Mask Danshi: This Shouldn't Lead to Love	Naoko Takeichi	October 20, 2023	OAD	Studio Fusion	Based on a manga by Mitsuru Sangō.
7	Given the Movie: Hiragi Mix	Noriko Hashimoto	January 27, 2024	Theatrical film	Lerche	Second sequel to Given.
8	Given the Movie: To the Sea	Noriko Hashimoto	September 20, 2024	Theatrical film	Lerche	Third sequel and conclusion to Given.
TBA	Twittering Birds Never Fly – The Storm Breaks	TBA	TBA	Theatrical film	Grizzly	Sequel to Twittering Birds Never Fly – The Clouds Gather.
TBA	Untitled Twittering Birds Never Fly sequel	TBA	TBA	TBA	TBA	Sequel to Twittering Birds Never Fly – The Storm Breaks.

== See also ==
- Noitamina, a Fuji TV anime programming block
- +Ultra, a Fuji TV anime programming block
