= Ryōta Takeuchi =

Japanese voice actor

- 竹内 良太
- Born: September 22, 1982 (age 44); Hyōgo Prefecture, Japan
- Occupation: voice actor
- Years active: 2007–present
- Agent: Aoni Production
- Notable work: Heroman as Heroman; The Ancient Magus' Bride as Elias Ainsworth; Dramatical Murder as Ren; Haikyu!! as Wakatoshi Ushijima; Naruto Shippuden as Darui
- Height: 180 cm (5 ft 11 in)

Ryōta Takeuchi (竹内 良太, Takeuchi Ryōta; born September 22, 1982) is a Japanese voice actor. He is represented by Aoni Production.

== Filmography ==
=== Anime series ===
Year	Title	Role
2008	Naruto Shippuden	Darui
2009	The Book of Bantorra	Gamo Rosso
2010	Heroman	Heroman
2010	Star Driver	Tropical Cafe Owner
2011	B-Daman Crossfire	Dravise
2011	Blue Exorcist	Kyōdō
2011	Nichijou	Soldier, Ogi, Otsuki, Soldier No. 98, Teacher
2011	Toriko	Malee, Rapp
2012	B-Daman Fireblast	Dravise
2012	Horizon in the Middle of Nowhere II	Francis Drake
2012	Magi: The Labyrinth of Magic	Isaac
2012	Muv-Luv Alternative: Total Eclipse	Gairos McCloud
2012	Robotics;Notes	J
2013	Cuticle Detective Inaba	Torayasu Kurami
2013	Gargantia on the Verdurous Planet	Matsumoto
2013	Golden Time	Bro
2013	High School DxD New	Albion
2013	Kill la Kill	Kyuji Obayashi
2013	Kin-iro Mosaic	Karen's father
2013	Strike the Blood	Gregory
2014	Captain Earth	MC
2014	Daimidaler: Prince vs Penguin Empire	Joseph
2014	DRAMAtical Murder	Ren
2014	Gonna be the Twin-Tail!!	Buffalogildy
2014	Haikyu!!	Wakatoshi Ushijima
2014	Hero Bank	Rohan Yuri
2014	Magica Wars	Shishiku
2014	Re: Hamatora	Shunichi Ishigami
2014	Super Sonico the Animation	Manager Kitamura
2014	The Pilot's Love Song	Marcos Guerrero
2014	When Supernatural Battles Became Commonplace	Shuugo Toki
2015	Aldnoah.Zero Season 2	Barouhcruz
2015	Assassination Classroom	Shiro
2015	Chivalry of a Failed Knight	Ikazuchi Saijou
2015	Diabolik Lovers More, Blood	Karlheinz
2015	Gate	Graham Morris
2015	Haikyu!! 2	Wakatoshi Ushijima
2015	Heavy Object	Harleed Copacabana
2015	High School DxD BorN	Albion
2015	Overlord	Dyne Woodwonder
2015	Rampo Kitan: Game of Laplace	Kitami
2015	Samurai Warriors	Katakura Kojūrō, Uesugi Kagekatsu
2015	Yatterman Night	General Saburoh
2015	Young Black Jack	Wolf
2016	All Out!!	Toshirou Wada
2016	Assassination Classroom Season 2	Shiro
2016	Beyblade Burst	Kento Aoi
2016	Dagashi Kashi	Pachipachi
2016	Dimension W	Jason Chrysler
2016	Haikyu!! Season 3	Wakatoshi Ushijima
2016	Joker Game	Jean Victoire
2016	Mobile Suit Gundam: Iron-Blooded Orphans Season 2	Jasley Donomikols
2016	Nurse Witch Komugi R	Neko-P
2016	Pandora in the Crimson Shell: Ghost Urn	Mr. Fried
2016	Puzzle & Dragons X	Radio DJ
2016	Time Bokan 24	Hijikata Toshizō
2017	ACCA: 13-Territory Inspection Dept.	Clam
2017	Attack on Titan Season 2	Thomas
2017	Boruto	Darui
2017	Clockwork Planet	Vermouth
2017	Gintama Season 4	Ichiboshi
2017	Inuyashiki	Samejima's Assistant
2017	Kirakira Pretty Cure a la Mode	Diable
2017	Knight's & Magic	Young Ambrosius Tahava Flemevilla
2017	Magical Circle Guru Guru	Kitaji
2017	March Comes In like a Lion	Kengo Kumakura
2017	My Hero Academia Season 2	Kenji Tsuragamae
2017	The Ancient Magus' Bride	Elias Ainsworth
2017	The Eccentric Family 2	Oni
2018	Angolmois: Record of Mongol Invasion	Hitari
2018	Bakugan: Battle Planet	Ichiro Kazami
2018	Basilisk: The Ouka Ninja Scrolls	Naomori Sakazaki
2018	Food Wars! The Third Plate Season 2	Histoire
2018	GeGeGe no Kitarō (2018)	Oin
2018	High School DxD Hero	Albion
2018	Hinomaru Sumo	Shidō Tennōji
2018	Idolish7	Douglas Rootbank
2018	Million Arthur	Leicester
2018	Ms. Koizumi Loves Ramen Noodles	Takagi
2018	Ninja Girl & Samurai Master 3rd	Shimozuma Rairen
2018	Legend of the Galactic Heroes: Die Neue These	Adalbert von Fahrenheit
2019	Actors: Songs Connection	Washiho Usuki
2019	Boogiepop and Others	Gen Sakakibara
2019	Cardfight!! Vanguard: Shinemon Arc	Ruga Kaizu
2019	Dr. Stone	Jasper
2019	Food Wars! The Fourth Plate	Histoire
2019	Given	Koji Yatake
2019	Million Arthur Season 2	Mark
2019	My Hero Academia	Kenji Tsuragamae
2019	Vinland Saga	Asgeir
2020	Appare-Ranman!	Sheriff
2020	Gibiate	Halbert
2020	Great Pretender	Salazar
2020	Haikyu!! To The Top	Wakatoshi Ushijima
2020	ID:Invaded	Fukuda
2020	I'm Standing on a Million Lives	Bihmsberg
2020	The Day I Became a God	Izanami's dad
2020	Warlords of Sigrdrifa	Hiroshi Takeuchi
2021	Cestvs: The Roman Fighter	Emden
2021	Heaven's Design Team	Unabara
2021	How a Realist Hero Rebuilt the Kingdom	Beowulf Gardner
2021	Rumble Garanndoll	Shinkoku Upper Level A
2021	Scarlet Nexus	Gemma Garrison
2021	Tesla Note	Omar
2021	World Trigger Season 3	Mikhail Cronin
2022	Platinum End	Yazeli
2022	Skeleton Knight in Another World	Goemon
2022	The Yakuza's Guide to Babysitting	Kazuhiko Sakuragi
2022	Made in Abyss: The Golden City of the Scorching Sun	Gaburoon
2023	Giant Beasts of Ars	Façade
2023	The Ancient Magus' Bride 2nd Season	Elias Ainsworth
2023	Ragna Crimson	Taratectora
2023	Paradox Live the Animation	Naoakira Saimon
2024	Bucchigiri?!	Outa
2024	Classroom of the Elite	Tokinari Tsukishiro
2024	Yakuza Fiancé: Raise wa Tanin ga Ii	Aoi Tachibana
2024	Blue Miburo	Kamo Serizawa
2025	Sakamoto Days	Minimalist
2025	Night of the Living Cat	Gaku
2026	Digimon Beatbreak	Seraphy Naito
2026	Nippon Sangoku	Go Sugo
2026	The Seven Knights of the Marronnier Kingdom	Saturno

=== Anime films ===
- Hanasaku Iroha: The Movie – Home Sweet Home (2013), Ayato Matsumae
- Boruto: Naruto the Movie (2015), Darui
- Ryōma! Shinsei Gekijōban Tennis no Ōji-sama (2021), Foo
- Dragon Ball Super: Super Hero (2022), Carmine

=== Original video animation ===
- The Ancient Magus Bride: Those Awaiting a Star (2016–2017), Elias Ainsworth

=== Original net animation ===
- A.I.C.O. -Incarnation- (2018), Daisuke Shinoyama
- Ultraman (2019–2022), Jack
- Kengan Ashura (2019), Kirimi Takakaze
- SD Gundam World Heroes (2021), Nobunaga Gundam Epyon
- Spriggan (2022), Larry Markson
- JoJo's Bizarre Adventure: Stone Ocean (2022), D an' G
- Tokyo Override (2024), Hugo
- Disney Twisted-Wonderland: The Animation (2025), Ashton Vargas

=== Video games ===
- Gears of War (2007), Minh Young Kim
- Bravely Default (2012), Ringabel/Alternis Dim
- DRAMAtical Murder (2012), Ren
- DRAMAtical Murder Re:connect (2013), Ren
- DRAMAtical Murder re:code (2014), Ren
- Bravely Second (2015), Alternis Dim
- Tokyo Mirage Sessions ♯FE (2015), Doug
- Princess Closet (2016), Tachibana Shuu
- Kyoei Toshi (2017), Hideyasu Otsuka
- Disney Twisted-Wonderland (2020), Ashton Vargas
- Genshin Impact (2020), Surtalogi
- Zenless Zone Zero (2024), Pan Yinhu

=== Dubbing ===
- Trolls Band Together, John Dory

=== Multimedia projects ===
- Paradox Live (2019), Naoakira Saimon
- MILGRAM (2020), Mukuhara Kazui

=== Stage performances ===
- Paradox Live on Stage (2022), Naoakira Saimon
