= Takuya Eguchi =

Japanese voice actor and singer

- 江口 拓也
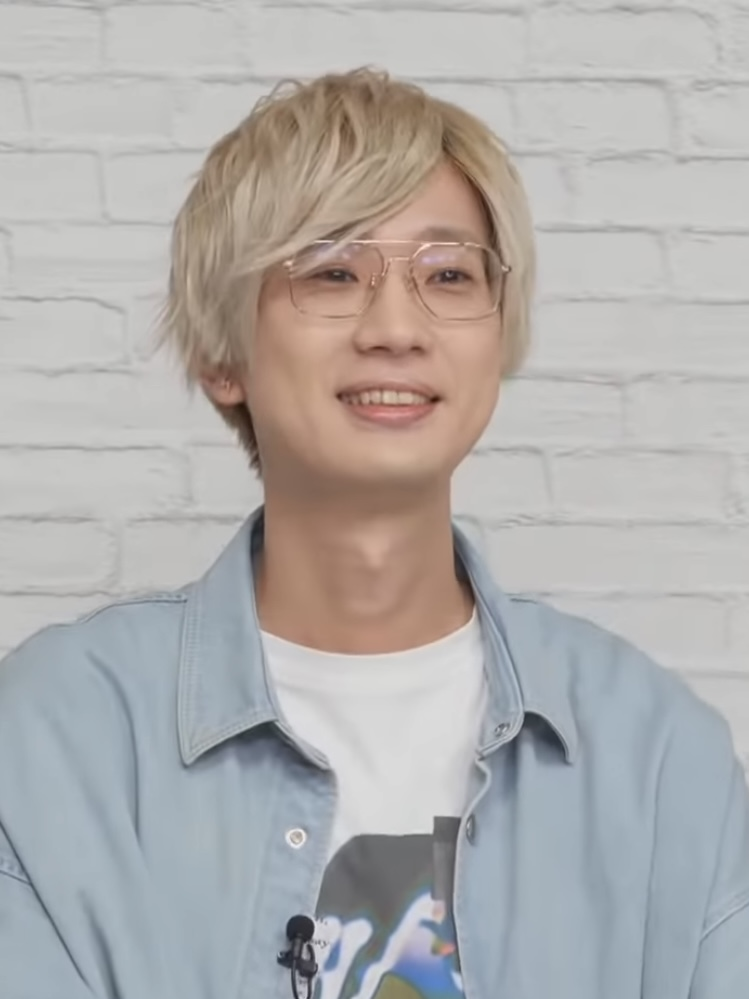
- Eguchi in 2022
- Born: May 22, 1987 (age 39); Setagaya, Tokyo, Japan
- Occupations: Voice actor; singer
- Years active: 2008–present
- Agent: 81 Produce
- Height: 189 cm (6 ft 2 in)

Takuya Eguchi (江口 拓也, Eguchi Takuya; born May 22, 1987) is a Japanese voice actor and singer. He is affiliated with 81 Produce. He has voiced in a number of lead roles in anime shows, including Kazuya Kujo in Gosick, Yoshiharu Sagara in The Ambition of Oda Nobuna, Kon Hokaze in Ixion Saga DT, Hachiman Hikigaya in My Youth Romantic Comedy Is Wrong, As I Expected, William Twining in Devils and Realist, Yuuji Terushima in Haikyuu!!, Takeo Gōda in My Love Story, and Loid Forger in Spy × Family. He won the Best New Actor Award at the 6th Seiyu Awards, and the Best Lead Actor Award and Most Valuable Seiyū Award at the 17th Seiyu Awards. He won Best Voice Actor in the Newtype Anime Awards 2015. Eguchi launched a manga about his life called Eguchi Takuya no Gainen Planet in 2017, published on Kadokawa's Dengeki Girl's Style Online website.

== Filmography ==
=== Anime ===
List of voice performances in anime
Year	Title	Role	Notes	Source
2008	Golgo 13	Parking staff		
2008	Live On Cardliver Kakeru ja:ライブオン CARDLIVER 翔			
2009	Akikan!	Male student		
2009	Gokujō!! Mecha Mote Iinchō	Taichi Sugimura 杉村太一		
2009	Eden of the East	Satoshi Ōsugi		
2009	Tatakau Shisho	Hyoue Janfus ヒョウエ=ジャンフス		
2009	Welcome to Irabu's Office	Yuta's friend		
2010	Katanagatari	Boufura Maniwa		
2010	Beyblade: Metal Masters	Customer		
2010	Lilpri	Momotaro		
2010	K-ON!!	Clerk		
2010	Seitokai Yakuindomo	Clerk		
2010	Nura: Rise of the Yokai Clan	Rat Yokai		
2010	MM!	Man, Male guest		
2011	Gosick	Kazuya Kujo		
2011	Sekai-ichi Hatsukoi	Clerk		
2011	Aria the Scarlet Ammo	Ryo Shiranui		
2011	Yu-Gi-Oh! Zexal	Shuta Hayami		
2011	Inazuma Eleven GO	Taiyou Amemiya, Kenma Isozaki, Sakio Kotegawa		
2011	Sacred Seven	Student		
2011	Battle Spirits: Heroes	Opponent		
2011	Sengoku Paradise	Sanada Yukimura		
2012	The Familiar of Zero F	Knight		
2012	Inu x Boku SS	Banri Watanuki		
2012	Sengoku Collection	Nephew		
2012–15	Kuroko's Basketball	Shinji Koganei		
2012	Mysterious Girlfriend X	Arima 有間		
2012	Inazuma Eleven GO 2: Chrono Stone	Taiyou Amemiya, Engiru		
2012	Campione!	Salvatore Doni		
2012	Sword Art Online	Ducker		
2012	The Ambition of Oda Nobuna	Yoshiharu Sagara	主人公	
2012	Battle Spirits: Sword Eyes	Revel		
2012	Ixion Saga DT	Kon Hokaze		
2013	Zettai Karen Children:Unlimited Psychic Squad	I · Hatta 伊・八號		
2013	Beast Saga	Ogre		
2013–20	My Teen Romantic Comedy SNAFU series	Hachiman Hikigaya	3 seasons	
2013	Mushibugyo	Shungiku Koikawa		
2013	Devils and Realist	William Twining		
2013	Pokémon Origins	Green		
2013	Voice Acting Sentai Boystome 7 ja:声優戦隊ボイストーム7	Ryu Kuroi 黒井龍		
2013	Ace of Diamond	Maki Yousuke		
2013	Gundam Build Fighters	Luang Dallara		
2014	Super Sonico	Chairman		
2014	Hamatora	Mao	Also Re:_Hamatora	
2014	Jinsei	Shiba Inu lover		
2014	Himegoto	Tadokoro		
2014	Love Stage!!	Ichijo Ryoma		
2015	Absolute Duo	Dark Ray Disaster		
2015	Cute High Earth Defense Club Love!	Enkaku Sōsa		
2015	Baby Steps	Atsushi Taira	season 2	
2015	My Love Story!!	Takeo Gōda		
2015	Chaos Dragon	Hien		
2015	Young Black Jack	Jou		
2015–16	Haikyu!!	Yuuji Terushima	season 2	
2016	Prince of Stride Alternative	Bantarō Chiyomatsu		
2016	Active Raid	Offender		
2016	Rainbow Days	Tomoya Matsunaga		
2016–2024	KonoSuba series	Kyōya Mitsurugi		
2016	Re:Zero − Starting Life in Another World	Julius Euclius		
2016	First Love Monster	Munemitsu Makurazaki		
2016	D.Gray-man Hallow	Madarao マダラオ		
2016	91 Days	Nero Vanetti		
2016	Danganronpa 3: The End of Hope's Peak High School	Sonosuke Izayoi	both arcs	
2016	BBK/BRNK	Hakushin Shinkansen 白靖承		
2016	Magic-kyun Renaissance	Kanato Hibiki		
2016	Girlish Number	Towada AP		
2016	Ruger code 1951 ja:ルガーコード1951	Sergeant Alex Rossa アレックス・ロッサ軍曹		
2017	Super Ultimate Detective Group NEO ja:超・少年探偵団NEO	Seventh-generation Fiend With Twenty Faces		
2017	Seiren	Tatsuya Araki		
2017	Akindo's Little Peso ja:アキンド星のリトル・ペソ	Ruble ルーブル		
2017	Warau Salesman NEW	Kenichi Nakajima 中島健一		
2017	The Royal Tutor	Ernst Rosenberg		
2017	Sagrada Reset	Tomoki Nakano		
2017	Deeky & Carina	Deeky	anime short collaboration with Sanrio	
2017	TsukiPro the Animation	Shiki Takamura		
2017	Dynamic Chord	Reon "King" Kashii		
2018–22	IDOLiSH7 series	Nagi Rokuya	Media project	
2018	Baki	Kaoru Hanayama		
2018	Mr. Tonegawa: Middle Management Blues	Kōji Dōshita		
2018	Bakumatsu	Kogorou Katsura		
2018	Sanrio Boys	Kōta Hasegawa		
2018	Space Battleship Tiramisu	Subaru-B		
2018	The Thousand Musketeers	Chassepot		
2018–21	That Time I Got Reincarnated as a Slime series	Sōei		
2019	Actors: Songs Connection	Kai Akizuki		
2019	Dimension High School	Spudio the 22nd		
2019	Domestic Girlfriend	Fumiya Kurimoto		
2019	Ensemble Stars!	Wataru Hibiki		
2019	Given	Akihiko Kaji		
2019	Grimms Notes The Animation	Tao		
2019	Bakumatsu Crisis	Kogorou Katsura		
2019	Ultraman	Dan Moroboshi		
2019	W'z	Gai		
2019	YU-NO: A Girl Who Chants Love at the Bound of this World	Hideo Toyotomi		
2020	A3! Season Spring & Summer	Tenma Sumeragi		
2020	ARP Backstage Pass	Chairman's secretary		
2020	Fruits Basket	Kakeru Manabe		
2020	The Misfit of Demon King Academy	Zepes Indu		
2020	Detective Conan	Chitose Sakai		
2021	2.43: Seiin High School Boys Volleyball Team	Ryūdai Jinno		
2021	Fruits Basket: The Final	Kakeru Manabe		
2021	Hortensia Saga	Roy Castro		
2021	Muteking the Dancing Hero	DJ		
2021	Ranking of Kings	Domas		
2021	The Saint's Magic Power is Omnipotent	Johan Valdec		
2021	Tokyo Revengers	Shuji Hanma		
2021	TsukiPro the Animation Season 2	Shiki Takamura		
2021	Visual Prison	Latour Saga		
2021	Yu-Gi-Oh! Sevens	Yuro Goha	Season 2	
2021	World's End Harem	Kyōji Hino		
2022	Aoashi	Akinori Kaneda		
2022	Heroines Run the Show	Ken Shibasaki		
2022	My Master Has No Tail	Byakudanji Tsubaki		
2022	Skeleton Knight in Another World	Danka		
2022	Spy × Family	Loid Forger		
2022	Utawarerumono: Mask of Truth	Yakutowaruto		
2022	Yu-Gi-Oh! Go Rush!!	Zwijo		
2023–2024	Mashle	Dot Barrett		
2023	Blue Lock	Kenyū Yukimiya		
2023	By the Grace of the Gods	Fernobelia	Season 2	
2023	Chibi Godzilla Raids Again	Chibi Ghidorah		
2023	Dead Mount Death Play	Tsubaki Iwanome		
2023	Frieren	Stoltz		
2023	Ragna Crimson	Chantioras		
2023	Reborn as a Vending Machine, I Now Wander the Dungeon	Michelle		
2023	Sorcerous Stabber Orphen: Chaos in Urbanrama	Halpert		
2024	Egumi Legacy	Legendary Final Climax BOM		
2024	Mr. Villain's Day Off	Sōten Blue		
2024	My Deer Friend Nokotan	Yoshiharu Tsubameya		
2024	Nights with a Cat Season 3	Miyama-senpai		
2024	Rising Impact	Tristan Liones		
2024	Twilight Out of Focus	Rei Inaba		
2025	Gnosia	Sha-Ming		
2025	Plus-Sized Misadventures in Love!	Yutaka Shigemori		
2025	The Unaware Atelier Master	Danzo		
2025	With You, Our Love Will Make It Through	Tsunagu Hidaka		
2025	Yano-kun's Ordinary Days	Omiya		
2026	Akane-banashi	Karashi Nerimaya		
2026	Go for It, Nakamura!	Sou Otogiri		
2026	Uncle's Obsession with Cute Things	Kenta Kawai		

=== Film ===
List of voice performances in film
Year	Title	Role	Notes	Source
2010	Pokémon: Zoroark: Master of Illusions	Yarukimono ヤルキモノ		
2011	Kami☆Voice~The Voice Makes a Miracle~	Tetsurō		
2012	Inazuma Eleven GO vs. Danbōru Senki W	Taiyou Amemiya		
2020	Given	Akihiko Kaji		
2020	The Island of Giant Insects	Kai Kazuhiko		
2020	Kono Sekai no Tanoshimikata: Secret Story Film	Ken Shibasaki		
2022	That Time I Got Reincarnated as a Slime the Movie: Scarlet Bond	Sōei		
2022	A Turtle's Shell Is a Human's Ribs	Raiō Raionji		
2023	Spy × Family Code: White	Loid Forger		
2024	Yamato yo Towa ni: Rebel 3199	Lambell		
2024	Ganbatte Ikimasshoi	Hayato Ninomiya		
2025	The Rose of Versailles	Florian de Gerodelle		
2025	Cute High Earth Defense Club Eternal Love!	Karurusu		

=== Tokusatsu ===
List of voice performances in Tokusatsu
Year	Title	Role	Notes	Source
2014	Ultraman Ginga S	Alien Chibull Exceller		
2014	Shin Ultraman Retsuden	Alien Chibull Exceller		

=== Video games ===
List of voice performances in video games
Year	Title	Role	Notes	Source
2010	Class of Heroes 2G	Ruaut ルオーテ	PS3	
2012	Kamikoi ja:神さまと恋ゴコロ	Tsujinomiya Kokoe 辻宮兼我	PSP, also 2014 version	
2012–15	Kuroko's Basketball games	Shinji Koganei	PSP	
2012	Mobile Suit Gundam AGE	Asemu Asuno アセム・アスノ	PSP, both Universe Accel and Cosmic Drive editions	
2013	Princess Arthur' ja:Princess Arthur	Perseval パーシヴァル	PSP	
2013	Valhalla Knights 3	Kevin ケビン	Other	
2013	Storm Lover 2nd ja:STORM LOVER 2nd	Mikoto Ninomiya 二宮真琴	PSP, also V in 2016	
2013	Koi Flower Days ja:恋花デイズ	Yota Hinata 日向陽太	PSP	
2013	Mushibugyo	Shungiku Koikawa	DS	
2013	My Youth Romantic Comedy Is Wrong, As I Expected	Hachiman Hikigaya	Also 2016	
2013	Devils and Realist	William Twining	DS	
2013	Fairy Fencer F	Sherman	PS3	
2013	Exstetra	Masaru マサル	DS, other	
2014	Shinobi, koi utsutsu ja:忍び、恋うつつ	Kirisaku Tadayori 霧隠忠人	PSP	
2014	Of the Red, the Light, and the Ayakashi	Bridge funeral 架月	PSP	
2014	Satomi Hakkenden ja:里見八犬伝 八珠之記	Beach road 浜路	PSP	
2014	Jooubachi No Oubou ja:女王蜂の王房	Ruby 红玉	PC	
2014	Granblue Fantasy	Vane	iOS, Android, Web Browser	
2015	Kaleido Eve ja:カレイドイヴ	Hiroshi Murase 村瀬洋	PSP, other	
2015	Root ∞ Rexx ja:ROOT∞REXX	Hayao Kujo / Shun Lion 九条駿/シュンライオン	Other	
2015	Durarara!! Relay	Miyoshi Yoshimune 三好吉宗	Other	
2015	Taisho × Alice games ja:大正×対称アリス	Gretel グレーテル	PC	
2015	Gakuen Heaven 2 ~Double Scramble!~	Tomo Kasahara	PSP, other	
2015	Ensemble Stars	Wataru Hibiki	iOS, Android	
2015	TSUKINO PARK	Shiki Takamura	iOS, Android	
2015	Possession Magenta ja:POSSESSION MAGENTA	Kyoya Mochizuki 望月恭弥		
2015	Shinobi, Koi Utsutsu 忍び、恋うつつ -雪月花恋絵巻-	Kirisaku Tadayori 霧隠忠人	Other	
2015	Prince of Stride	Bantarō Chiyomatsu		
2015	Ray Gigant	Kazuomi Miwa 三輪和臣		
2015	IDOLiSH7	Nagi Rokuya	iOS, Android	
2015	Rear Pheles: Red of Another	Chitose Amitaro 千歳琥太郎		
2015–16	Utawarerumono games	Yakutwald ヤクトワルト	PS3	
2015–16	Hakuōki series	Rikasaburo Nomura 野村利三郎		
2016	Akai Suna Ochiru Tsuki ja:赤い砂堕ちる月	Wang Ming 汪明		
2016	Uppers ja:UPPERS	Koyanagi Seiya 小柳清也		
2016	Collar × Malice	Kohsuki Hoshino 星野香月		
2016	Magic★Kyun! Renaissance	Kanato Hibiki		
2016	Dynamic Chord games ja:DYNAMIC CHORD	Kashii Reon 香椎玲音		
2017	A3! Act! Addict! Actors!	Tenma Sumeragi	iOS, Android	
2017	The Legend of Heroes: Trails of Cold Steel III	Kurt Vander	PS4, Steam, Switch	
2017	TSUKINO PARADISE	Shiki Takamura	iOS, Android	
2017	YU-NO: A Girl Who Chants Love at the Bound of this World	Hideo Toyotomi		
2018	Food Fantasy (2018)	Boston Lobster, Hamburger, Coffee	iOS, Android	
2018	IDOLiSH7 Twelve Fantasia	Nagi Rokuya	PS Vita game	
2018	DYNAMIC CHORD JAM&JOIN!!!!	Kashii Reon 香椎玲音	iOS, Android	
2020	The King of Fighters for Girls	Kim Kaphwan	iOS, Android	
2024	Reverse: 1999	Getian		
2025	The Red Bell's Lament	Ciaran Lowell	Nintendo Switch	
2027	Romancing SaGa 3: Destinies United	Thomas Bent		

=== Drama CD ===
List of voice performances in drama CD
Year	Title	Role	Notes	Source
2011–12	Ikkizuki! series ja:つきツキ!	Shinobu Nanjo 南条忍		
2012	Sound drama 101 stories ja:101番目の百物語	One character gale 一文字疾風		

=== Dubbing ===
Year	Title	Role	Voice dub for	Notes	Source
2012	Battleship	Angus	John Bell		
2016	Don't Breathe	Money	Daniel Zovatto		
2018	Fantastic Beasts: The Crimes of Grindelwald	Theseus Scamander	Callum Turner		
2021	Mortal Kombat	Liu Kang	Ludi Lin		
2022	Fantastic Beasts: The Secrets of Dumbledore	Theseus Scamander	Callum Turner		
2023	Spider-Man: Across the Spider-Verse	Ben Reilly / Scarlet Spider	Andy Samberg	Animation	
2023	The Marvels	Prince Yan	Park Seo-joon		
2024	Twisters	Scott	David Corenswet		
2026	Hoppers	Bird King	Isiah Whitlock Jr.	Animation	
2026	The Odyssey	Antinous	Robert Pattinson		
2026	Mortal Kombat II	Liu Kang	Ludi Lin		
2026	Toy Story 5			Animation	

=== TV Show ===
Year	Title	Role	Notes
2016	Eguchi Takuya no Oretachi Datte Mo~tto Iyasaretai! Season 1	Host	
2016	TSUKIPRO channel. Season 1	Guest	
2016	TSUKIPRO channel. Season 2	Guest	
2016–2017	Eguchi Takuya no Oretachi Datte Mo~tto Iyasaretai! Season 2	Host	
2017–2018	Eguchi Takuya no Oretachi Datte Mo~tto Iyasaretai! Season 3	Host	
2019	Eguchi Takuya no Oretachi Datte Mo~tto Iyasaretai! Season 4	Host	
2020	Drain the Oceans Season 3	Narrator	Episodes 1 to 5

=== Character song ===
Year	Release date	Album	Role	Track title	note
2015	March 13	SolidS vol.1	SolidS	「S.N.P」 「Labyrinth」 「Exit Of Days」	Character song of SQ
2015	May 29	SolidS vol.2	SolidS	「TIGHT/NIGHT」	Character song of SQ
2015	May 29	SolidS vol.2	Shiki Takamura; Rikka Sera	「DARK MOON ANGEL」	Character song of SQ
2015	May 29	SolidS vol.2	Shiki Takamura	「Shinku no Koi、Rin to Hikare」	Character song of SQ
2015	July 31	SolidS vol.3	SolidS	「SEXY☆SENSE」	Character song of SQ
2015	July 31	SolidS vol.3	Tsubasa Okui; Shiki Takamura	「クロノア -chronoah-」	Character song of SQ
2015	October 31	SolidS vol.4	SolidS	「ロミオ -ROMEO-」 「Doubutsu no Saga」 「Midnight Mystery」	Character song of SQ
2016	March 25	RED	SolidS	「CRAZY BABY SHOW」	Character song of SQ
2016	March 25	RED	Shiki Takamura; Dai Murase	「Roug:e」	Character song of SQ
2016	May 27	BLACK	SolidS	「Judas」	Character song of SQ
2016	September 30	WHITE	SolidS	「Liar・Crier」 「TOKYO LOVE JUNKIE」	Character song of SQ
2016	November 25, 2016	Tide -Hikari no Sasu Hou e-	Shiki Takamura	「Hikari no Sasu Hou e」	Character song of SQ
2017	February 24	Omote SolidS	SolidS	「Cocoro」	Character song of SQ
2017	March 24, 2017	VOL.1 SHIKI X SHU	Shiki Takamura	「Cross Notes」	Character song of SQ
2017	June 30	Ura SolidS	SolidS	「KARA DA KARA」	Character song of SQ
2017	October 6	Burny!!!	SolidS	「Burny!!!」	Opening theme song of TSUKIPRO THE ANIMATION
2017	December 22	TSUKIPRO THE ANIMATION Volume 1	SolidS	「Ouka Ranman」	Ending theme song of TSUKIPRO THE ANIMATION
2018	February 23	TSUKIPRO THE ANIMATION Volume 3	SolidS	「Back On Track」	Ending theme song of TSUKIPRO THE ANIMATION
2018	April 27	TSUKIPRO THE ANIMATION Volume 5	SolidS	「Unmei wo Koeru "Venga"」	Ending theme song of TSUKIPRO THE ANIMATION
2018	May 25	vol.1 Shiki & Tsubasa	Tsubasa Okui; Shiki Takamura	「LADY JOKER」	Character song of SQ
2018	June 15	TSUKIPRO THE ANIMATION Volume 7	Tsukipro	「Dear Dreamer,」	Ending theme song of TSUKIPRO THE ANIMATION
2019	January 25	vol.3 SolidS	SolidS	「DOPE↗ROCK」	Character song of SQ
2019	February 22	vol.4 Shiki & Rikka	Shiki Takamura; Rikka Sera	「Between the Sheets」	Character song of SQ
2019	July 26	vol.6 SolidS	SolidS	「I AM A BARTENDER」	Character song of SQ
2020	January 15	Suki Sugite Yabai.	Ken Shibasaki	「Namaiki Honey」 「Ijiwaru na Deai」	Character songs for Ken Shibasaki, replacing Yoshimasa Hosoya
2020	April 24	DIAMOND♦	SolidS	「GAME IS MINE」 「Timeless」	Character song of SQ
2020	October 30	Vol.1 Shiki & Issei	Shiki Takamura; Issei Kuga	「ONE WILL」	Character song of SQ
2020	November 25	Kon'yaku Senso/Samishigariya	Ken Shibasaki; Aizo Shibasaki	「Samishigariya」	Character song of the Shibasaki brothers
2021	July 9	LOVE 'Em ALL	SolidS	「LOVE 'Em ALL」	Opening theme song of TSUKIPRO THE ANIMATION 2
2021	November 26	TSUKIPRO THE ANIMATION Volume 1	SolidS	「KAN-ZEN-OFF-MODE」	Ending theme song of TSUKIPRO THE ANIMATION 2
2022	January 28	TSUKIPRO THE ANIMATION Volume 3	Morihito Arihara; Soshi Kagurazaka; Kensuke Yaegashi; Ryota Sakuraba; Shiki Takamura; Tsubasa Okui	「Nagori Oni」	Opening theme song of TSUKIPRO THE ANIMATION 2
2022	February 25	SPADE♠	SolidS	「Awesome♛Again」 「& Night Trap」	Character song of SQ
2022	April 29	TSUKIPRO THE ANIMATION Volume 6	SolidS; Sora Ohara; Mamoru Fujimura; Shiki Takamura; Shu Izumi	「Kamikazari to Corsage」 「Elements」	Ending theme song of TSUKIPRO THE ANIMATION 2
2022	May 27	TSUKIPRO THE ANIMATION Volume 7	SOARA; Growth; SolidS; QUELL	「Best Wishes,」	Ending theme song of TSUKIPRO THE ANIMATION 2
2022	October 28	my redemption	Shiki Takamura	「my redemption」	Character song of SQ
2023	March 31	Best Wishes, ver.SolidS	SolidS	「Best Wishes,」	Character song of SQ
2024	July 26	TSUKIPRO THE ANIMATION ENDING THEME SONG COLLECTION	SOARA; Growth; SolidS; QUELL	「Ouka Ranman」 「Back On Track」 「Unmei wo Koeru "Venga"」 「Dear Dreamer,」	Ending theme song of TSUKIPRO THE ANIMATION
2024	December 27	SEXY♂SENSE / Last・Darling	SolidS	「SEXY♂SENSE」 「Last・Darling」	Character song of SQ
2025	February 28	Best Wishes, ver.SolidS	SOARA; Growth; SolidS; QUELL	「KAN-ZEN-OFF-MODE」 「Nagori Oni」 「Kamikazari to Corsage」 「Elements」 「Best Wishes,」	Ending theme song of TSUKIPRO THE ANIMATION 2
