= Grizzly (studio) =

Japanese animation studio

Grizzly, Inc.
- Native name: 株式会社 GRIZZLY
- Romanized name: Kabushiki-gaisha Grizzly
- Company type: Kabushiki gaisha
- Industry: Anime
- Founded: December 25, 2017; 8 years ago
- Defunct: February 20, 2025; 15 months ago
- Headquarters: Nakano, Tokyo, Japan
- Key people: Manabu Otsuka (CEO)
- Website: grizzly.co.jp

Grizzly, Inc. (株式会社 GRIZZLY, Kabushiki-gaisha Grizzly; stylized in all caps) was a Japanese animation studio. It was the first studio to produce boys' love or BL (male-male romance) anime exclusively.

== History ==
Grizzly was established on December 25, 2017, and formally unveiled at Anime Japan on March 23, 2018, with the announcement that the studio would adapt Yarichin Bitch Club into a series of original video animations (OVAs).

An affiliation between Grizzly and MAPPA was reported after the MAPPA Twitter account posted and deleted material that was later posted on the Grizzly account, and after the Grizzly website was found to be registered using a MAPPA email. The exact relation between the studios is unknown, but MAPPA CEO Manabu Otsuka acted as representative of Grizzly, and staff from the studio worked on Grizzly productions. The studio was dissolved on February 20, 2025.

== Works ==
=== Anime films ===
Year	Title	Director(s)	Release date	Dur.	Note(s)	Refs.
2020	Twittering Birds Never Fly – The Clouds Gather	Kaori Makita	February 15, 2020	85m	Based on a manga written by Kou Yoneda. Distributed by Blue Lynx.	
TBA	Twittering Birds Never Fly – The Storm Breaks	TBA	TBA	TBA	Sequel to Twittering Birds Never Fly – The Clouds Gather.	

=== OVAs and OADs ===
Title	Director	Released	Note(s)	Ref(s)
Yarichin Bitch Club	Ai Yoshimura	September 21, 2018 – April 17, 2019	Two episodes; based on a manga by Ogeretsu Tanaka.	
Don't Stay Gold	Kaori Makita	March 1, 2021	Prequel to Twittering Birds Never Fly – The Clouds Gather; released as an original animation DVD.	
