= Shōgo Yano =

Japanese voice actor (born 1989)

- 矢野 奨吾
- Born: March 19, 1989 (age 37); Tokushima Prefecture, Japan
- Occupation: Voice actor
- Years active: 2012–present
- Agent: Super Eccentric Theater
- Notable credits: Yu-Gi-Oh! Arc-V as Shingo Sawatari; The Idolmaster as Nao Okamura; Given as Mafuyu Satō

Shōgo Yano (矢野 奨吾, Yano Shōgo; born March 19, 1989) is a Japanese voice actor affiliated with Super Eccentric Theater. Yano graduated from Hosei University and debuted as an actor in 2012, in a stage role with Super Eccentric Theater. He debuted as a voice actor in 2014, as the voice of Shingo Sawatari in the anime series Yu-Gi-Oh! Arc-V.

== Filmography ==
=== Anime ===
Year	Title	Role	Ref.
2014	Yu-Gi-Oh! Arc-V	Shingo Sawatari	
2016	B-Project: Kodō*Ambitious	Engineer	
2017	Digimon Universe: App Monsters	Student	
2017	The Idolmaster SideM	Nao Okamura	
2017	Blood Blockade Battlefront & Beyond	Seller	
2018	The Seven Deadly Sins: Revival of the Commandments	Puora, Ende, Soracid	
2018	Boarding School Juliet	Student, Referee	
2018	The Idolmaster SideM: Wake Atte Mini!	Nao Okamura	
2018	Tsurune	Nanao Kisaragi	
2019	Mob Psycho 100 II	Udo	
2019	Given	Mafuyu Satō	
2020	number24	Takumi Hidaka	
2021	Pretty Boy Detective Club	Hyota Ashikaga	
2021	Visual Prison	Jack Mouton	
2022	Fanfare of Adolescence	Yu Arimura	
2022	3 Seconds Later, He Turned Into a Beast	Kaname Tōjō (on-air version)	
2023	Paradox Live the Animation	Reo Maruyama	
2025	Honey Lemon Soda	Kai Miura	
2026	Magical Sisters LuluttoLilly	Tachibana	

=== Films ===
Year	Title	Role	Ref.
2020	Given	Mafuyu Satō	
2022	Tsurune: The Movie – The First Shot	Nanao Kisaragi	

=== Video games ===
Year	Title	Role	Ref.
2016	The Idolmaster SideM	Nao Okamura	
2017	Star Revolution☆88 Seiza no Idol Kakumei	Jun Kujira	
2017	Hiragana Danshi Itsura no Kowe	No	
2017	The Idolmaster SideM Live on Stage	Nao Okamura	
2019	Fire Emblem: Three Houses	Ignatz	
2019	Hero's Park	Amase Shu	
2019	The Seven Deadly Sins: Grand Cross	Sariel	

=== Television ===
Year	Title	Role	Ref.
2014	Shitsuren Chocolatier on Fuji TV		
2015	Beauty and The Fellow on NHK G	Candidato A	
2015	Iryū Sōsa on TV Asahi		
2016	Keishichō Nashigoren-ka on TV Asahi	Ken'ichi Kurashiki	

=== Dubbing ===
Title	Role	Dubbing Actor	Ref.
Almost Never	Nate	Nathaniel Dass	
Shazam! (THE CINEMA edition)	Burke Breyer	Evan Marsh	

=== CD dramas ===
Year	Title	Role	Ref.
2019	Paradox Live	Reo Maruyama	
