= Given (manga) =

Japanese manga series by Natsuki Kizu

- Cover to the first volume of the manga series. Clockwise from far left: Haruki Nakayama, Akihiko Kaji, Ritsuka Uenoyama, and Mafuyu Satō

ギヴン (Givun)
- Genre: Boys' love, drama, romance
- Manga
- Written by: Natsuki Kizu
- Published by: Shinshokan
- English publisher: NA: SuBLime
- Imprint: Dear+ Comics
- Magazine: Chéri+
- Original run: April 30, 2013 – March 30, 2023
- Volumes: 9
- Manga

Given: 10th mix
- Written by: Natsuki Kizu
- Published by: Shinshokan
- Imprint: Dear+ Comics
- Magazine: Chéri+
- Original run: January 30, 2024 – March 28, 2025
- Volumes: 1
- Audio drama
- Produced by: Crown Works
- Studio: Dice Entertainment
- Original run: February 25, 2016 – February 25, 2020
- Episodes: 5
- Anime television series
- Directed by: Hikaru Yamaguchi
- Written by: Yuniko Ayana
- Music by: Michiru (Score); Centimillimental (Songs)
- Studio: Lerche
- Licensed by: Crunchyroll
- Original network: Fuji TV (Noitamina)
- Original run: July 11, 2019 – September 19, 2019
- Episodes: 11
- Anime film
- Given the Movie (2020); Given the Movie: Hiiragi Mix (2024); Given the Movie: To the Sea (2024)
- Television drama
- Directed by: Kōichirō Miki
- Licensed by: Crunchyroll
- Original network: FOD
- Original run: July 17, 2021 – August 21, 2021
- Original animation DVD

Given - On the Other Hand
- Directed by: Akiyo Ōhashi
- Written by: Yuniko Ayana
- Music by: Michiru (Score); Centimillimental (Songs)
- Studio: Lerche
- Licensed by: Crunchyroll
- Released: December 1, 2021
- Runtime: 22 minutes

Given (Japanese: ギヴン, Hepburn: Givun; stylized in all lowercase) is a Japanese manga series written and illustrated by Natsuki Kizu. It was serialized in the bimonthly manga magazine Chéri+ from 2013 to 2023 and collected in nine tankōbon volumes by Shinshokan.

The series follows four students who form an amateur rock band called Given. Its central storyline focuses on guitarist Ritsuka Uenoyama and Mafuyu Sato, a vocalist who joins the band. Other storylines explore the relationships between bassist Haruki Nakayama and drummer Akihiko Kaji.

Given explores romantic relationships, grief and the characters' personal experiences through their involvement in music. The manga has received several adaptations, beginning with an audio drama released in 2016. An 11-episode anime television series aired in 2019 on Fuji TV's Noitamina programming block. It was the first boys' love (BL) anime to be broadcast in the slot. A theatrical anime film followed in 2020, focusing on the relationship between Haruki and Akihiko. A live-action television drama adaptation aired in 2021.

The manga is licensed in North America by SuBLime, a joint imprint of Viz Media and Animate. Crunchyroll distributes the anime television series and film internationally.

== Plot ==
Given follows four main story arcs, each focusing on different members of the band and their relationships. The first follows Ritsuka Uenoyama and Mafuyu Sato as they form the band and develop a romantic relationship. The second focuses on Akihiko Kaji and Haruki Nakayama during the band's preparation for a music competition. The third follows Mafuyu's childhood friends, Hiiragi Kashima and Shizusumi Yagi, as they deal with the aftermath of Yuki Yoshida's death and their feelings for each other. The final arc follows Mafuyu as he considers his future, while Ritsuka works on completing a song based on a demo recorded by Yuki.

=== Ritsuka and Mafuyu ===
Ritsuka Uenoyama is a high school student who plays guitar in a band with college students Haruki Nakayama, who plays bass, and Akihiko Kaji, who plays drums. He meets his classmate Mafuyu Sato after repairing the broken strings on Mafuyu's Gibson ES-330 guitar. Although initially reluctant, Ritsuka agrees to teach Mafuyu how to play. After hearing him sing, Ritsuka invites him to join the band.

Ritsuka later learns that the guitar belonged to Mafuyu's childhood friend and former boyfriend, Yuki Yoshida, who died by suicide. As the band prepares for its first live performance, Mafuyu struggles to write lyrics for their song. During the concert, he performs an emotional song about his grief over Yuki's death. His performance brings him and Ritsuka closer, and the two share a kiss backstage, beginning their romantic relationship. The band subsequently adopts the name Given.

=== Akihiko and Haruki ===
After their first live performance attracts attention online, Given enters an amateur music competition. However, tensions within the group affect their preparations. Haruki has romantic feelings for Akihiko, who is still involved with his former partner, the pianist Ugetsu Murata.

Akihiko eventually moves out of the apartment he shares with Ugetsu and turns to Haruki for support. He temporarily stays with Haruki, although their relationship remains uncertain. On the day of the competition's qualifying concert, Akihiko ends his relationship with Ugetsu. Given performs a new song written by Mafuyu but fails to advance to the next round.

Akihiko subsequently moves out of Haruki's apartment and devotes more time to his music studies. Several months later, following a violin competition, he confesses his feelings to Haruki. He explains that he wanted to improve himself and become someone worthy of Haruki's affection. The two begin a romantic relationship.

=== Hiiragi and Shizusumi ===
Hiiragi Kashima and Shizusumi Yagi, childhood friends of Mafuyu and former bandmates of Yuki, continue to deal with the circumstances surrounding Yuki's death. They are members of the band Syh, which is preparing for a major debut. When the group loses its guitarist, Ritsuka is brought in as a temporary replacement.

As they work together, Hiiragi struggles with guilt over Yuki's death, while Shizusumi has difficulty expressing his feelings. Their shared history and unresolved emotions affect their relationship. Hiiragi eventually acknowledges his romantic feelings for Shizusumi, and the two begin moving towards a relationship.

== Characters ==
=== Main characters ===
Mafuyu Sato (佐藤 真冬, Satō Mafuyu)
Voiced by: Sōma Saitō (audio drama), Shōgo Yano (anime) (Japanese); Brandon McInnis (English)
A 16-year-old high school student who serves as Given's lead vocalist and rhythm guitarist. Although he has no formal musical training, he learns to play guitar and write songs after joining the band. His boyfriend, Yuki Yoshida, died by suicide, an event that continues to affect him and his ability to express his emotions. Mafuyu lives with his pet Pomeranian, Kedama.
Ritsuka Uenoyama (上ノ山 立夏, Uenoyama Ritsuka)
Voiced by: Makoto Furukawa (audio drama), Yuma Uchida (anime) (Japanese); Jessie James Grelle (English)
A 16-year-old high school student and Given's lead guitarist. He began playing guitar in sixth grade after receiving his first instrument from his father. Before meeting Mafuyu, Ritsuka had become less interested in music following the departure of his former bandmates. He initially agrees to teach Mafuyu guitar reluctantly but later invites him to join the band after hearing him sing. His relationship with Mafuyu develops alongside his renewed interest in music. Although generally considerate, Ritsuka can be blunt and has difficulty expressing his feelings.
Haruki Nakayama (中山 春樹, Nakayama Haruki)
Voiced by: Yasuaki Takumi (audio drama), Masatomo Nakazawa (anime) (Japanese); Y. Chang (English)
A 22-year-old graduate student and Given's bassist. He serves as the band's de facto leader and often mediates disagreements between its members. Haruki is sociable and generally easygoing, although he sometimes feels insecure about his musical abilities in comparison with the other members. He has romantic feelings for Akihiko Kaji, which eventually develop into a relationship. Outside the band, Haruki manages its social media accounts and public presence.
Akihiko Kaji (梶 秋彦, Kaji Akihiko)
Voiced by: Satoshi Hino (audio drama) Takuya Eguchi (anime) (Japanese); Jonah Scott (English)
A 20-year-old college student and Given's drummer. He studies violin and also plays guitar and bass. Akihiko has a history of romantic involvement with his former boyfriend, Ugetsu Murata, a violinist with whom he shares a long and difficult relationship. His feelings for Haruki eventually lead him to end his relationship with Ugetsu. After focusing on his musical studies and taking part in a violin competition, Akihiko confesses his feelings to Haruki, and the two begin dating.
Hiiragi Kashima (鹿島 柊, Kashima Hiiragi)
Voiced by: Toshiki Masuda (audio drama), Fumiya Imai (anime) (Japanese); Howard Wang (English)
A childhood friend of Mafuyu Sato and Shizusumi Yagi, and a former bandmate of Yuki Yoshida. He is the guitarist and leader of Syh, a band he formed with Yuki and Shizusumi during high school. Following Yuki's death, Hiiragi continues working towards the band's major debut. He also develops romantic feelings for Shizusumi, with whom he shares a long history.
Shizusumi Yagi (八木 玄純, Yagi Shizusumi)
Voiced by: Daiki Hamano (audio drama), Taito Ban (anime) (Japanese); Joshua Waters (English)
A childhood friend of Mafuyu Sato and former classmate of Hiiragi Kashima. He formed the band Syh with Hiiragi and Yuki Yoshida during high school. Following Yuki's death, Shizusumi continues performing with Syh alongside Hiiragi. Although generally reserved, he is closely connected to Hiiragi, and their relationship eventually becomes romantic.

=== Supporting characters ===
Yuki Yoshida (吉田 由紀, Yoshida Yuki)
Voiced by: Yoshiki Nakajima (audio drama), Yuuki Shin (anime) (Japanese); Brendan Blaber (English)
Mafuyu's childhood friend and former boyfriend, who died before the events of the series. He appears primarily in flashbacks and is an important figure in Mafuyu's backstory. Both grew up in single-parent households and often spent time without adult supervision. Their relationship became romantic during their teenage years but later deteriorated. Yuki died by suicide after consuming alcohol. Before his death, he played guitar in a band with his friends Hiiragi Kashima and Shizusumi Yagi.
Ugetsu Murata (村田 雨月, Murata Ugetsu)
Voiced by: Atsushi Tamaru (audio drama), Shintarō Asanuma (anime) (Japanese); J. Michael Tatum (English)
A professional violinist and former boyfriend and roommate of Akihiko Kaji. He is recognised for his musical ability and has an established career as a performer. His relationship with Akihiko is marked by recurring disagreements and difficulties.
Yayoi Uenoyama (上ノ山 弥生, Uenoyama Yayoi)
Voiced by: Sayuri Yahagi (audio drama), Yū Shimamura (anime) (Japanese); Hayden Daviau (English)
Ritsuka's older sister and a member of her school's art club. She is a talented painter and previously had unrequited feelings for Akihiko. After he rejects her, she begins a relationship with Kōji Yatake. Yayoi later learns about Ritsuka's relationship with Mafuyu and Akihiko's relationship with Haruki.
Shōgo Itaya (板谷 翔吾, Itaya Shōgo)
Voiced by: Junya Enoki (audio drama), Kengo Takanashi (anime) (Japanese); Greg Cote (English)
A friend and classmate of Ritsuka who plays as a striker on his school's football team. He is regarded as a promising young athlete in the Kantō region and is also skilled at other ball sports, including basketball.
Ryō Ueki (植木 涼, Ueki Ryō)
Voiced by: Taku Yashiro (audio drama), Hirosato Amano (anime) (Japanese); Stephen Fu (English)
A friend and classmate of Ritsuka who plays center on the school's basketball team.
Kōji Yatake (矢岳 光司, Yatake Kōji)
Voiced by: Daiki Hamano (audio drama), Ryōta Takeuchi (anime) (Japanese); Kellen Goff (English)
A college classmate of Haruki who plays bass and sings. He also works as a video editor and helps promote musical acts. He later begins dating Yayoi Uenoyama.
Tsubaki (つばき)
Voiced by: Mitsuki Nakae (anime) (Japanese); Morgan Lauré Garrett (English)
Mafuyu's co-worker at the concert venue where he works. The character appears in the anime adaptation but not in the original manga.

== Media ==
=== Manga ===
Given has been serialized in the bimonthly magazine Chéri+ since April 2013. In Japan, the series has been collected into nine bound volumes published by Shinshokan. An English-language translation is published by Viz Media under their SuBLime imprint, with the first volume released in February 2020. The series ended serialization on March 30, 2023.

No.	Original release date	Original ISBN	English release date	English ISBN
1	November 29, 2014	978-4-403-66449-6	February 11, 2020	978-1-9747-1182-6
2	January 30, 2016	978-4-403-66503-5	May 12, 2020	978-1-9747-1183-3
3	March 1, 2017	978-4-403-66561-5	August 11, 2020	978-1-9747-1184-0
4	December 29, 2017	978-4-403-66614-8	November 10, 2020	978-1-9747-1185-7
5	April 1, 2019	978-4-403-66674-2	February 9, 2021	978-1-9747-1186-4
6	August 3, 2020	978-4-403-66736-7	September 14, 2021	978-1-9747-2367-6
7	December 1, 2021	978-4-403-66782-4	January 10, 2023	978-1-9747-3447-4
8	October 3, 2022	978-4-403-66834-0	October 10, 2023	978-1-9747-4095-6
9	September 1, 2023	978-4-403-66880-7	August 13, 2024	978-1-9747-4702-3

On January 30, 2024, a one-shot sequel, Given 10th Mix, premiered in the March 2024 issue of Chéri+. Its events take place 10 years after the conclusion of the original manga.

No.	Original release date	Original ISBN	English release date	English ISBN
1	October 1, 2025	978-4-4036-6993-4	November 10, 2026	978-1-9747-6923-0

Given is the first multi-volume work produced by manga artist Natsuki Kizu, following her two previous single-volume series Yukimura-sensei to Kei-kun (Yukimura and Kei, 2013) and Links (2014).

=== Anime ===
An anime television series adaptation produced by Lerche was announced during a Fuji TV press conference on March 14, 2019. The series aired from July 11 to September 19, 2019, on Noitamina, the network's late-night anime programming block, making Given the first BL series to air on Noitamina. The series is syndicated by Crunchyroll, which simulcasts the series worldwide outside of Asia. In Southeast Asia, the series was released on WeTV on May 18, 2021.

The series' primary production staff includes Hikaru Yamaguchi as director, Yuniko Ayana as scriptwriter, Mina Osawa as character designer, and Michiru as score composer. The series' four original songs — the opening theme "Kizuato", the closing theme "Marutsuke", and the original songs "Session" and "Fuyu no hanashi" (lit. "A Winter Story") — are composed and performed by Centimillimental, with additional vocals from Mafuyu voice actor Shōgo Yano on "Marutsuke" and "Fuyu no hanashi". The anime features a new voice cast, recasting the roles from the Crown Works audio drama.

Given: Existence on the Other Hand (ギヴン うらがわの存在, Given: Uragawa no Sonzai), an original animation DVD (OAD), was released on December 1, 2021, bundled with the manga's seventh volume, with another OAD called Given: Glimpses of Life being released on October 1, 2025, bundled with Given: 10th Mix.

==== Episodes ====
The majority of the episode titles in Given are references to British alternative rock songs, Ritsuka's favourite genre of music; episode nine is titled after the original song performed in the episode.

No.	Title	Storyboarded by	Produced by	Original release date
1	"Boys in the Band"	Hikaru Yamaguchi	Yu Kinome, Hikaru Yamaguchi	July 11, 2019
High school student and guitarist Ritsuka Uenoyama repairs the broken strings on a guitar belonging to classmate Mafuyu Satō, who asks Ritsuka to teach him to play the instrument. Ritsuka refuses, though he invites Mafuyu to watch a practice session of a band composed of himself, bassist Haruki Nakayama, and drummer Akihiko Kaji.
2	"Like Someone in Love"	Yoichi Fujita, Hikaru Yamaguchi	Yusuke Kamada	July 18, 2019
Ritsuka agrees to teach Mafuyu in guitar playing and continues inviting him to his band's practice sessions. During one of their lessons, Mafuyu sings an original melody to Ritsuka. Stunned and impressed, Ritsuka invites Mafuyu to join the band as a vocalist.
3	"Somebody Else"	Shinichiro Kimura, Hikaru Yamaguchi	Shinichiro Kimura	July 25, 2019
Mafuyu declines Ritsuka's invitation. Later, Ritsuka and Mafuyu run into Hiiragi Kashima, a friend from Mafuyu's past, causing a distressed reaction from Mafuyu. He confides in Ritsuka, explaining that he declined the invitation because he struggles to express himself, though Ritsuka says that his singing deeply moved him. Mafuyu decides to join the band.
4	"Fluorescent Adolescent"	Yu Kinome	Yu Kinome	August 1, 2019
Mafuyu officially joins the band. He and Ritsuka travel to Shibuya to purchase a guitar pedal.
5	"The Reason"	Yoko Kanamori	Hiromichi Matano	August 8, 2019
As the band prepares for a live performance, Ritsuka begins to compose music for Mafuyu's melody. A flashback reveals the band's inception: Haruki recruited Ritsuka after their respective bands disbanded, and later recruited Akihiko (whom Haruki had secretly admired at first sight) after sharing a class together. In the present, Ritsuka hears a rumor alleging that Mafuyu formerly dated a boy who died by suicide during middle school.
6	"Creep"	Hitomi Jiang	Yusuke Kamada	August 15, 2019
The band finishes composing music for Mafuyu's melody and instructs him to write the song's lyrics. Mafuyu tells Ritsuka that he wishes to write the song about a person he once loved, triggering feelings of jealousy in Ritsuka.
7	"Tumbling Dice"	Iku Suzuki	Yuki Nishihata	August 22, 2019
Mafuyu struggles to write lyrics for the song. Ritsuka realizes that he has romantic feelings for Mafuyu. A flashback details Akihiko's past relationship with Ugetsu Murata, a violin prodigy who now lives with Akihiko.
8	"Time Is Running Out"	Shinichiro Kimura	Shinichiro Kimura	August 29, 2019
Flashbacks reveal Mafuyu's childhood friendships with Hiiragi, Yagi Shizusumi, and Yūki Yoshida, the lattermost of whom eventually became Mafuyu's boyfriend. After a falling out between Yūki and Mafuyu, Yūki drank heavily and committed suicide. In the present, the day of the live performance arrives, but Mafuyu still has not written lyrics for the song.
9	"A Winter Story"	Yu Kinome, Hitomi Jiang, Hikaru Yamaguchi	Yu Kinome, Hikaru Yamaguchi	September 5, 2019
Mafuyu has a breakthrough moments before the band's performance, and sings an emotional song about his feelings of loss over Yūki. The performance prompts Mafuyu to realize his romantic feelings for Ritsuka, and they kiss backstage. A post-credits scene depicts a flashback to a date between Yūki and Mafuyu.
10	"Wonderwall"	Noriko Hashimoto	Noriko Hashimoto, Yu Kinome	September 12, 2019
The band decides to name itself "Given" as a homage to the guitar given by Yūki's mother to Mafuyu after Yūki's passing. Mafuyu tells Ritsuka that he loves him.
11	"Song2"	Yoshinori Hirai, Yu Kinome	Yusuke Kamada	September 19, 2019
Despite reservations about potential tension within the band, Ritsuka and Mafuyu reveal their relationship to Haruki and Akihiko, who accept it. The band shoots their first promotional photos and celebrates Haruki's birthday. Haruki realizes that he desires a relationship with Akihiko beyond his unrequited feelings. Mafuyu tells Ritsuka that he wants to write a new song.

==== Media release ====
Aniplex released Given across four volumes, in DVD and Blu-ray media formats.

Volume	Episodes	Release date	Ref.
Volume 1	1–2	September 25, 2019	
Volume 2	3-5	October 30, 2019	
Volume 3	6-8	November 27, 2019	
Volume 4	9-11	December 25, 2019	

=== Film ===
A film sequel to the Given anime series was announced on September 19, 2019. The film is a direct continuation of the anime series and adapts the second arc of the manga, which focuses on the relationship between Haruki and Akihiko. Development of the film was transferred from Noitamina to Blue Lynx, Fuji TV's yaoi anime label launched in 2019. The production staff and voice cast of the anime adaptation returned for the film, including Hikaru Yamaguchi as director and Yuniko Ayana as screenwriter. The film was originally scheduled for release on May 16, 2020, but was delayed to August 22, 2020, due to the COVID-19 pandemic. Select screenings of the film from August 22 to 28 included an interview with the film's main cast and footage of Mafuyu voice actor Shōgo Yano performing "Marutsuke". Streaming service Crunchyroll announced in October 2020 that it had acquired international distribution rights outside of Asia for the film, which it released on February 2, 2021. In Southeast Asia, WeTV released the film on May 25, 2021.

A sequel anime film was announced in March 2023, and later revealed as a two-part film project in August of that year. with the first part, Hiiragi Mix (映画 ギヴン 柊mix, Eiga Givun: Hiiragi mix) was released in Japan on January 27, 2024, and the second part, To the Sea (映画 ギヴン 海へ, Eiga Given: Umi e) on September 20, 2024.

=== Stage play ===
A stage play adaptation of Given was announced on April 3, 2020, with Fumiya Matsuzaki as director and Given anime screenplay writer Yuniko Ayana returning as scriptwriter. Originally slated to be staged at theaters in Tokyo, Kyoto, and Osaka from August 15 to September 6, 2020, it was initially cancelled as a result of the COVID-19 pandemic before being rescheduled to November 2021.

A 2nd stage play adaptation Butai Given: Umi e was set to run in May 2025, but it was cancelled due to the bankruptcy and closure of theater company Trifle Entertainment in January 2025.

=== Live-action drama ===
A six-episode live-action drama adaptation of Given was announced on May 26, 2021, and was released on Fuji TV's FOD streaming service on July 17, 2021. The series is directed by Kōichirō Miki and stars Jin Suzuki as Ritsuka Uenoyama, Sanari as Mafuyu Satō, Kai Inowaki as Akihiko Kaji, and Shuntarō Yanagi as Haruki Nakayama. Crunchyroll licensed the series for distribution in English in non-Asian regions.

== Discography ==
=== Audio drama albums ===
An audio drama CD adapting scenes from the first volume of Given was included with the February 2016 issue of Chéri+. That same month, Crown Works began to release a series of audiobook drama CDs that adapt each volume of the manga.

List of audio drama albums, with selected chart positions, sales figures and certifications
Title	Year	Album details	Peak chart positions	Sales
Title	Year	Album details	JPN	Sales
Given	2016	Released: February 25, 2016; Label: Crown Works; Formats: CD	64	—
Given 2 (Note: A limited edition marketed as a "live edition" was released with Given 2 and Given 5, which contained a bonus CD containing songs performed by Soma Saito, the voice actor of Mafuyu. Oricon combines sales rankings of the limited editions with the regular editions.)	2017	Released: January 25, 2017; Label: Crown Works; Formats: CD	53	—
Given 3	2018	Released: January 26, 2018; Label: Crown Works; Formats: CD	100	—
Given 4	2018	Released: November 22, 2018; Label: Crown Works; Formats: CD	185	—
Given: Simple Edition (Note: Given: Simple Edition is a re-release of the first audio drama CD, Given.)	2019	Released: May 17, 2019; Label: Crown Works; Formats: CD	—	—
Given 5	2020	Released: February 25, 2020; Label: Crown Works; Formats: CD	46	—
"—" denotes releases that did not chart or were not released in that region.

=== Extended plays ===
An eight-track extended play titled Gift (stylized in all lowercase) was released by Sony Music Japan on August 26, 2020. The album, credited to "Given" and marketed as an album by the band, collects the original songs from the television anime series and film. The album's cover artwork features an original illustration by Natsuki Kizu.

List of extended plays, with selected chart positions, sales figures and certifications
Title	Year	Album details	Peak chart positions		Sales	Certifications
Title	Year	Album details	JPN Oricon	JPN Hot	Sales	Certifications
Gift	2020	Released:August 26, 2020; Label: Epic Records Japan; Formats: CD, digital download	12	11	JPN: 6,577 (physical)	—N/a
"—" denotes releases that did not chart or were not released in that region.

=== Singles ===
List of singles, with selected chart positions, sales figures and certifications
Title	Year	Peak chart positions			Sales	Album
Title	Year	JPN	JPN Hot	JPN Ani.	Sales	Album
Centimillimental
"Kizuato" (キヅアト)	2019	22	—	—	—	Non-album single
"Bokura Dake no Shudaika" (僕らだけの主題歌)	2020	28	—	—	JPN: 2,710	Non-album single
Given
"Marutsuke" (まるつけ)	2019	19 (Note: "Marutsuke" and "Fuyu no Hanashi" were released physically as a double A-side single. The sales count and Oricon ranking reflects both songs combined.)	95	13	JPN: 4,418	Gift
"Fuyu no Hanashi" (冬のはなし)	2019	19	—	—	JPN: 4,418	Gift
"—" denotes releases that did not chart or were not released in that region.

== Reception ==
=== Manga ===
The second volume of Given reached #39 on Oricon, selling 17,484 copies in its second week for a total of 30,308 copies as of February 2016. The third volume reached #37 on Oricon and sold 24,345 copies in its first week. The series ranked #7 in the boys' love category on the digital book service BookLive! in the first half of 2019.

=== Anime ===
The anime adaptation of Given was positively received by critics. In a review of episodes one and two for Anime News Network, Steve Jones called the series "one of the season's most emotionally resonant offerings," praising its soundtrack and Yamaguchi's direction. The series' writing, which Jones noted was "undercooked, but not egregiously so" in his initial review, was noted by Jones as improving in subsequent episodes. Specific praise was given to the relationship between Mafuyu and Ritsuka, with Jones calling it "one of the most compelling anime romances of the year."

In a review for Crunchyroll, Adam Wescott called Given "the best show you aren't watching right now," giving specific praise to its sound and lighting design.

=== Film ===
In its opening weekend, the film adaptation of Given ranked first in Kogyotsushinsha's tracking of mini-theater ticket sales and remained in first for five consecutive weeks. In the overall box office, the film ranked 9th in its opening weekend despite opening in only 30 theaters – roughly one-tenth the number of theaters of its closest competitors. By September 14, 2020, the film had sold 100,000 tickets.
