= Masatomo Nakazawa =

Japanese actor and voice actor (born 1983)

- 中澤 まさとも
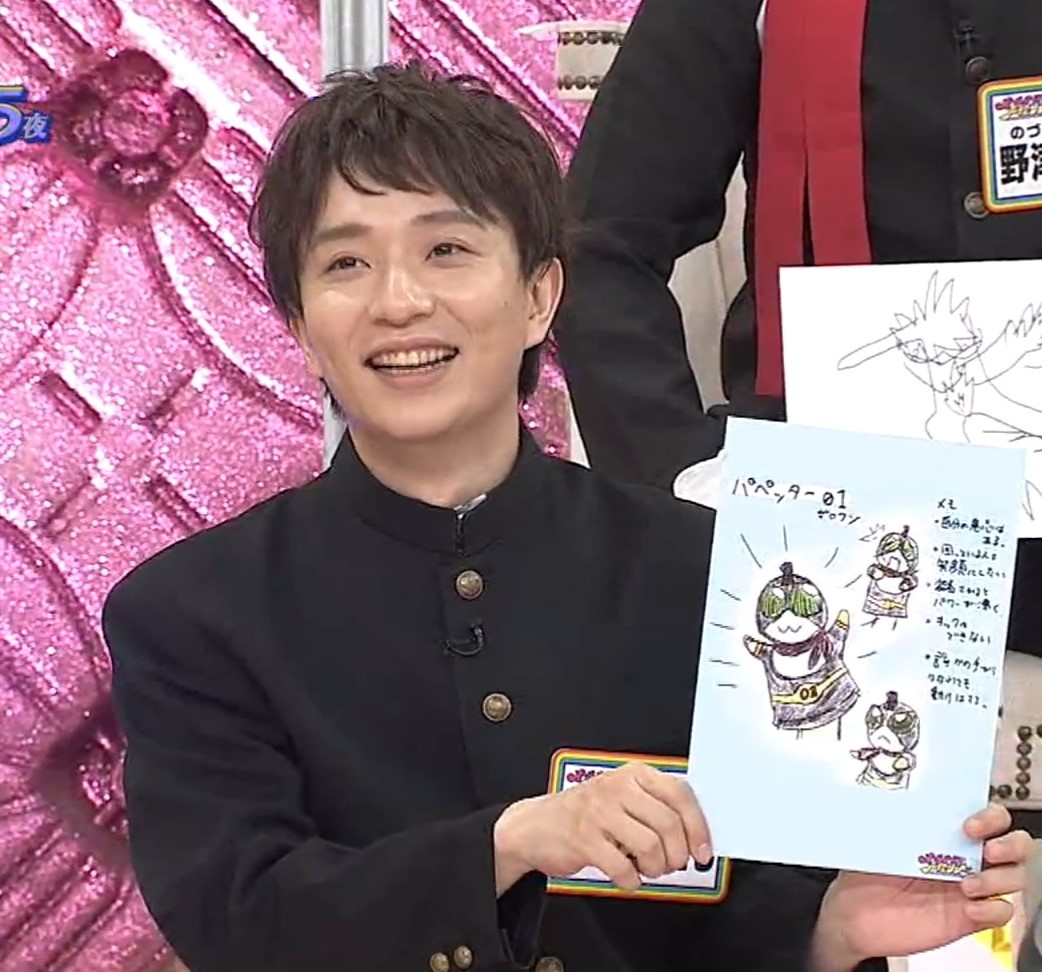
- Born: 14 February 1983 (age 42); Nerima, Tokyo, Japan
- Occupations: Actor; voice actor
- Years active: 2003–present
- Agent: Haikyō
- Notable work: Dramatical Murder as Clear; Haikyu!! as Kenji Futakuchi
- Children: 1

Masatomo Nakazawa (中澤 まさとも, Nakazawa Masatomo; born 14 February 1983) is a Japanese actor and voice actor, represented by Haikyō. He is best known for his role of Clear in the Dramatical Murder franchise.

On October 5, 2020, it was announced Nakazawa had tested positive for COVID-19, but was asymptomatic.

== Filmography ==
=== Anime ===
2003

- Reborn to Master the Blade: From Hero-King to Extraordinary Squire Theodore
- Ai Yori Aoshi as Young Boy
- Dear Boys as Student

2009

- Fullmetal Alchemist: Brotherhood as Soldier

2013

- Silver Spoon as Naoki Toyoda

2014

- Jinsei as Kaname Ashitagawa
- Dramatical Murder as Clear
- Haikyu!! as Kenji Futakuchi

2015

- Haikyu!! 2nd Season as Kenji Futakuchi
- Ranpo Kitan: Game of Laplace as Keiji A. Yajiuma
- Hetalia: The World Twinkle as Hutt River

2017

- Mobile Suit Gundam: Iron-Blooded Orphans as Arianerod Fleet Soldier
- Fuuka as Kankyaku
- Kirakira PreCure a la Mode as Ryuta Yokogawa
- Sakura Quest as Nakayama
- ID-0 as Operator C
- Princess Principal as Eric

2019

- Given as Haruki Nakayama

2020

- The Titan's Bride as Baro Barows
- Noblesse as Tao

2021

- Wonder Egg Priority as Shuichiro Sawaki

2022

- Blue Lock as Wataru Kuon

2024

- Twilight Out of Focus as Giichi Ichikawa

=== OVAs ===
2014

- BLB as Yuhito Baba

2017

- Landreaall

2018

- Yarichin Bitch Club as Itsuki Shikatani

=== Video games ===
2012

- PhaseD as Haruka Kuze
- Project X Zone as Various
- Dramatical Murder as Clear

2013

- Dramatical Murder re:connect as Clear

2014

- Dramatical Murder re:code as Clear

2018

- London Detective Mysteria PSV remake as Jack Millers

2020

- Ensemble Stars! as Tatsumi Kazehaya
