= Yarichin Bitch Club =

2012 webcomic series

- Cover of the first manga volume, featuring Yaguchi, Tōno, and Kashima

ヤリチン☆ビッチ部 (Yarichin Bitchi-bu)
- Genre: Yaoi
- Manga
- Written by: Ogeretsu Tanaka
- Published by: Gentosha
- English publisher: NA: SuBLime
- Imprint: Birz Comics Rutile Collection Luxe
- Original run: June 10, 2012 – present
- Volumes: 7
- Original video animation
- Directed by: Ai Yoshimura
- Music by: Shūji Katayama
- Studio: Grizzly
- Released: September 21, 2018 – April 17, 2019
- Runtime: 24 minutes
- Episodes: 2

Yarichin Bitch Club (Japanese: ヤリチン☆ビッチ部, Hepburn: Yarichin Bitchi-bu; lit. 'Playboy Slut Club') is a Japanese web manga series written and illustrated by Ogeretsu Tanaka. Yarichin Bitch Club has been self-published on Pixiv since 2012, and in 2016 it received a print publication by Gentosha.

In 2018, the webcomic also received two original animated videos by Grizzly, released direct-to-DVD.

== Plot ==
Takashi Tōno is a freshman student who is transferred from Tokyo to Morimori Academy, a private college prep boarding high school located deep in the mountains. Soon after arriving, he befriends Kyōsuke Yaguchi, who is a member of the soccer club and invites Tōno to join him in the club. Tōno's lack of interest in sports forces him to enter the quietest club of all: the photography club. However, the photography club is not what it seems, since the members' duties consist of having sex with other students and teachers of the school.

== Characters ==
Takashi Tōno (遠野 高志, Tōno Takashi)
Voiced by: Yūsuke Kobayashi
Tōno was transferred to Morimori Academy from Tokyo due to his father's job. Unfortunately he entered the Yarichin Club believing it was just a normal photography club. He is hopeless at sports (especially ball games) and gets shy around people, and is often shocked by the activities of the Yarichin Club, frequently walking in on them by accident. He develops a crush on Yaguchi.
Yū Kashima (加島 優, Kashima Yū)
Voiced by: Daiki Hamano
The second new transfer student to Morimori Academy. Joined the photography club for photos, but it had nothing to do with photography. He is good at studying and grew up in a big family. He likes Tōno and pretends to be in a relationship with him to prevent him from being raped after the monthly sex results, leading to him actually developing a major crush on him.
Kyōsuke Yaguchi (矢口 恭介, Yaguchi Kyōsuke)
Voiced by: Ayumu Murase
Nicknamed "Yacchan", Kashima's cousin and a member of the soccer club. Yaguchi is Tōno's only friend in class, and they strike up an easy friendship, with Tōno soon developing feelings for him. He comes off as cheerful and kind, and is very popular in class, but this is merely a facade; in reality, he is deeply troubled by jealousy from Kashima, who he looks up to as a master, and is actually a very dark and angry person when faced.
Ayato Yuri (百合 絢斗, Yuri Ayato)
Voiced by: Takuya Satō
A second year student. He is a versatile, meaning he can be either a top or a bottom, and behaves very oddly, speaking in broken sentences and slurred words and frequently making random noises. Despite this, he is one of the smartest students in the entire school, and takes extra classes and tests.
Yui Tamura (田村 唯, Tamura Yui)
Voiced by: Kazuyuki Okitsu (BLCD)
Voiced by: Yūki Ono (OVA)
A second year student who has an unrequited love towards Yaguchi. He has a great sense of loyalty and likes to do disgusting things to people. He cannot express his thoughts very well, and usually ends up saying the complete opposite of what he intends.
Keiichi Akemi (明美 圭一, Akemi Keiichi)
Voiced by: Tsubasa Yonaga
President of the Yarichin Club and Itome's boyfriend. Enrolled in Morimori Academy since middle school, he is half Japanese and half French. His full name is Keiichi Claude Akemi.
Kōshirō Itome (糸目 幸士郎, Itome Kōshirō)
Voiced by: Masahiro Yamanaka
Akemi's boyfriend, a silent member of Yarichin Club with a romantic personality. Usually a top, but is a bottom when having sex with Akemi. Itome is deeply in love with Akemi and hails from a rich family.
Itsuki Shikatani (鹿谷 樹, Shikatani Itsuki)
Voiced by: Masatomo Nakazawa
A clean freak with a persecution complex, and a hypochondriac towards most things except sex. Likes wearing women's clothing. He is a bottom and frequently suffers at the hands of Matsumura, a teacher, who blackmails him into having sex with him.
Tōru Fujisaki (藤咲 透, Fujisaki Tōru)
Voiced by: Kentarō Kumagai
A first year student who becomes obsessed with Yuri after he saved his life when he tried to commit suicide by jumping from the roof of the school.
Matsumura (松村)
Voiced by: Daisuke Ono
A chemistry teacher at Morimori Academy. He is eventually revealed to be in a secret relationship with Shikatani, and will frequently have sex with him in the classroom when school hours are over; however, he is blackmailing him.

== Media ==
=== Manga ===
Yarichin Bitch Club is written and illustrated by Ogeretsu Tanaka, who had been posting it on Pixiv since 2012. The webcomic later received a print publication by Gentosha in 2016, with chapters being released in seven bound volumes.

The manga has been licensed for publication in the United States by SuBLime.

| No. | Original release date | Original ISBN | English release date | English ISBN |
|---|---|---|---|---|
| 1 | March 24, 2016 | 978-4-344-83631-0 (regular edition); ISBN 978-4-344-83632-7 (limited edition) | November 12, 2019 | 978-1-97-470928-1 |
1. "Join the Club" (クラブに参加する, Kurabu ni Sanka Suru); 2. ""Ahh"-lurring" (「ああ」誘う, `Ā'izanau); 3. "From the Front and the Back" (前からも後ろからも, Mae Kara mo Ushirokara mo); 4. "Fail and Get Fucked" (失敗したら犯される～♥, Shippai shitara Okasareru~♥); 5. "I Wanna Stick It In!" (アイ・ワナ・スティック・イット・イン, Ai Wana Sutikku Itto In!); 6. "Don't Take My Sunglasses" (私のサングラスを取らないでください, Watashi no Sangurasu o Toranaide Kudasai)
First-year student, Takashi Tono, transfers to Mori Mori Academy—a prestigious, all-boys boarding school located deep in the mountains—from Tokyo. Once there, he befriends a fellow first-year named Yaguchi from whom he learns that he is required to join a club. Thinking it will be the easiest club to choose, Tono finds himself in the Photography Club, where he immediately learns it is just a cover for the Yarichin Bitch Club, a club dedicated to providing sexual services to the student body (and staff). Tono is joined by a fellow first-year, Yu Kashima, who also unwittingly joins the Bitch Club (he actually likes photography). Tono and Kashima discover that they will be required to meet a monthly quota, failure to do so, and they will be gang-banged by the rest of the club members. However, Kashima and Tono are both virgins. The two new members then have to fight off potential clients as the month goes on, while Tono tries to find his place at his new school, quickly becoming friends with Yaguchi, and getting to know Kashima and the other club members. In order to get out of meeting the quota (and getting gang-banged) Kashima exclaims that he and Tono are dating, surprising everyone, especially Tono. Later, Yuri, the club's vice president, saves another student from committing suicide, leading this student to start stalking him.
| 2 | May 24, 2017 | 978-4-344-83940-3 (regular edition); ISBN 978-4-344-83941-0 (limited edition) | February 11, 2020 | 978-1-97-470929-8 |
7. "Yacchan and Yaguchi" (やっちゃんと矢口, Yatchan to Yaguchi); 8. "Humping Trip" (ハンピングトリップ, Hanpingutorippu); 9. "Wet T-Shirt Paradise" (濡れたTシャツパラダイス, Nureta Tīshatsu Paradaisu); 10. "Mushrooms of All Sizes" (あらゆる大きさのキノコ, Arayuru Ōki-sa no Kinoko); 11. "Fuck Ghosts" (ファック・ゴースト, Fakku Gōsuto)
Yaguchi has always been jealous of his cousin, Kashima, for always out-doing him, and ultimately leading Yaguchi's former crush to reject him. He plans to make Tono fall in love with him after finding out Kashima and Tono are dating. The students prepare for a camping trip into the mountains. Tono ends up in a group with Yaguchi and two other club members, Shikatani and Itome. During this trip, Tono grows to understand them more, while also getting closer with Yaguchi. Part of the camping trip involves a Test of Courage, however, and during their group's turn, as a storm descends upon the camp, Yaguchi and Tono accidentally fall into a ravine and get separated from the other two group members. While freaking out about the storm, Tono discovers Yaguchi's true self: he's not the sweet, bubbly guy everybody thinks he is, he's angry and vicious. During this time, Yuri and his (former) stalker, Fujisaki, grow closer, leading Yuri to reveal what his face looks like without his sunglasses only to him.
| 3 | September 21, 2018 | 978-4-344-84237-3 (regular edition); ISBN 978-4-344-84238-0 (limited edition) | May 12, 2020 | 978-1-97-470930-4 |
12. "A Little Squirt of the Past" (過去の小さな潮吹き, Kako no Chīsana Shiofuki); 13. "Clubroom Cuckolds" (部室の寝取られ, Bushitsu no Netorare); 14. "The Seed of Love" (愛の種, Ai no Tane); 15. "Goo-Goo Heaven" (グーグーヘブン, Gūgūhebun)
Yaguchi tells Tono about his past and why he puts on his nice act all the time. Tono tries to convince him to be his real self instead of trying to please others. After the storm ends, the two make it back to the rest of the campers and Kashima takes Tono to the nurse and while alone together, Kashima confesses that he is actually in love with Tono. Later, the club has to move rooms and, in doing so, Tono learns some of the history of the club. Meanwhile, Kashima tries to convince Tono to date him, but Tono is struggling to figure out his feelings. Yaguchi begins to realize his own feelings for Tono, but has trouble expressing them, leading him to invite Tono over to help him clean his dorm room and then spend the night, sharing his bed. However, Yaguchi realizes his mistake when he is unable to sleep. Yuri takes Fujisaki's virginity, and seems to be reciprocating Fujisaki's love for him.
| 4 | January 22, 2021 | 978-4-344-84765-1 (regular edition); ISBN 978-4-344-84766-8 (limited edition) | February 8, 2022 | 978-1-9747-1541-1 |
16. "No One Has to Know" (誰も知る必要はない, Dare mo Shiru Hitsuyō Wanai); 17. "The Grass is Greener" (草は青い, Kusa wa Aoi); 18. "Boys Gone Wild" (ボーイズ・ゴーン・ワイルド, Bōizu Gōn Wairudo)
Shitakani finds himself blackmailed by one of his regular partners, one of the teachers at Mori. While being trapped in this situation, he reflects on his past and his first love, whom he has avoided contacting since moving to Mori. The other club members, worried about Shitakani, devise a plan to get the teacher off his back. Later, Yaguchi continues to struggle with his growing feelings for Tono as well as the growing resentment he holds against Kashima. This leads to him and Kashima getting into a fight, which Tono breaks up, and during which Yaguchi lets out all the pent anger he has for Kashima. After realizing what he's done, and at Tono's suggestion, Yaguchi reconciles with Kashima. For the start of summer vacation, the bitch club goes to a hot spring, with the intent to have endless sex. During this, Fujisaki asks Yuri to be his boyfriend, which shocks Yuri.
| 5 | July 23, 2022 | 978-4-344-85073-6 (regular edition) | August 8, 2023 | 978-1-9747-3899-1 |
19. "Boys Gone Wild, Part 2" (ボーイズ・ゴーン・ワイルド、パート2, Bōizu Gōn Wairudo, Pāto 2); 20. "Gonna Be Fireworks"花火になるよ (Hanabi ni Naru Yo); 21. "You Tell 'Im" (ユー・テル・アイム, Yū Teru Aimu); 22. "Sex Pic Scandal!?!" (セックス写真スキャンダル⁉, Sekkusu Shashin Sukyandaru⁉); 23. "Butt Brothers" (バットブラザーズ, Battoburazāzu)
After the events of the hot spring trip, Tono starts to grow closer to Yaguchi, which leads Kashima and Yaguchi to compete for Tono's affection. Tamura also tries to confess his feelings for Yaguchi, but is rejected and he finds himself genuinely heartbroken. Meanwhile, Akemi struggles with the loss of a picture with his former boyfriend and tries desperately to find it.
| 6 | December 24, 2024 | 978-4-344-85523-6 (regular edition) | January 13, 2026 | 978-1-974-76129-6 |
24. "Take Your Script and Shove It" (台本分からせ編, Daihon wakara se-hen); 25. "Hypnosis is a Hell of a Drug" (催眠モノは困らせもの, Saimin mono wa komara se mono); 26. "Come Onto the Culture Festival" (ぶっかけ文化祭, Bukkake bunkamatsuri); 27. "My Heart's Gonna Blow" (この思いは本気汁, Kono omoi wa honki-jiru)
| 7 | July 23, 2026 | 978-4-344-85785-8 (regular edition) | | |

=== Drama CD ===
A series of audio dramas were released on CD by Ginger Records. The first drama CD was announced with the release of volume 1 of the manga and was later released on June 10, 2016. The second drama CD was released on August 25, 2017.

=== OVA ===
An original animated DVD was announced at AnimeJapan 2018 at Toho's booth. It was released direct-to-video on DVD on September 21, 2018, as part of a bundle with the limited edition of volume 3 of the manga. It was animated by Grizzly, with Ai Yoshimura directing, Noel Mizuki in charge of series composition, Koji Haneda in charge of character designs, Shūji Katayama in charge of music, and Kisuke Koizumi in charge of sound directing. The cast from the drama CDs reprised their roles. A second episode was released on April 17, 2019, as a separate Blu-ray and DVD titled Morimori Version, which also included episode 1, a 16-page exclusive manga by Ogeretsu Tanaka, and an audio drama CD. The home release was given an R-15 rating.

The theme song is "Touch You" by Shiritsu Morimori Gakuen Seishun Danshis, with the cast members performing as their characters. "Touch You" is composed by Yuyoyuppe, with lyrics written by Ogeretsu Tanaka, the original author of the manga. "Touch You" was released as a single on August 15, 2018, and included individual versions of the song for all nine characters. In November 2020, "Touch You" charted fourth in the Global Viral Top 10 on Spotify in the United States and England after it gained popularity on TikTok, in part due to unofficial mash-ups with the 2020 song "WAP" by Cardi B and Megan Thee Stallion.

| No. | Title | Directed by | Written by | Original release date |
|---|---|---|---|---|
| 1 | "Episode 1"; Transliteration: "Dai-ichi-wa" (Japanese: 第1話) | Ai Yoshimura | Unknown | September 21, 2018 |
| 2 | "Episode 2"; Transliteration: "Dai-ni-wa" (Japanese: 第2話) | Ai Yoshimura | Unknown | April 17, 2019 |

== Discography ==
=== Singles ===
List of singles, with selected chart positions, sales figures and certifications
| Title | Year | Peak chart positions | Sales | Album |
| Title | Year | JPN | Sales | Album |
|---|---|---|---|---|
| "Touch You" | 2018 | 27 | JPN: 2,839 | Non-album single |
| "Cherry Flavor" (ちぇりー味) | 2018 | 45 | — | Non-album single |
| "Strawberry Flavor" (いちご味) | 2018 | 59 | — | Non-album single |
| "Banana Flavor" (ばなな味) | 2018 | 50 | — | Non-album single |
"—" denotes releases that did not chart or were not released in that region.

== See also ==
- Happy of the End, another manga series by the same creator
- Oretachi Maji-kō Destroy, another manga series by the same creator under the pseudonym Marmelo Tanaka
