= Looks like a Job for a Maid! The Tales of a Dismissed Supermaid =

Japanese light novel series

- First light novel volume cover

メイドなら当然です。 濡れ衣を着せられた万能メイドさんは旅に出ることにしました (Meido Nara Tōzen Desu. Nureginu o Kiserareta Bannō Meido-san wa Tabi ni Deru Koto ni Shimashita)
- Genre: Fantasy
- Novel series
- Written by: Yasuaki Mikami
- Published by: Shōsetsuka ni Narō
- Original run: September 26, 2021 – present
- Light novel
- Written by: Yasuaki Mikami
- Illustrated by: Kinta
- Published by: Earth Star Entertainment
- English publisher: NA: J-Novel Club
- Imprint: Earth Star Novel
- Original run: July 15, 2022 – present
- Volumes: 9
- Manga
- Written by: Yasuaki Mikami
- Illustrated by: Ayahito Kumagai
- Published by: Earth Star Entertainment
- English publisher: NA: J-Novel Club
- Imprint: Earth Star Comics
- Magazine: Comic Earth Star
- Original run: October 6, 2022 – present
- Volumes: 7
- Anime television series

Looks like a Job for a Maid! The Tales of a Dismissed Supermaid (Japanese: メイドなら当然です。 濡れ衣を着せられた万能メイドさんは旅に出ることにしました, Hepburn: Meido Nara Tōzen Desu. Nureginu o Kiserareta Bannō Meido-san wa Tabi ni Deru Koto ni Shimashita) is a Japanese light novel series written by Yasuaki Mikami and illustrated by Kinta. It began serialization online in September 2021 on the user-generated novel publishing website Shōsetsuka ni Narō. It was later acquired by Earth Star Entertainment, who have published nine volumes since July 2022 under their Earth Star Novel imprint. A manga adaptation with art by Ayahito Kumagai has been serialized online via Earth Star Entertainment's Comic Earth Star manga website since October 2022 and has been collected in seven tankōbon volumes. An anime television series adaptation has been announced.

== Media ==
=== Light novel ===
Written by Yasuaki Mikami, Looks like a Job for a Maid! The Tales of a Dismissed Supermaid began serialization on Shōsetsuka ni Narō on September 26, 2021. It was later acquired by Earth Star Entertainment who began publishing the series with illustrations by Kinta under their Earth Star Novel light novel imprint on July 15, 2022. Nine volumes have been released as of October 15, 2026.

During their panel at Anime NYC 2025, J-Novel Club announced that it had also licensed the series for English publication.

No.	Original release date	Original ISBN	North American release date	North American ISBN
1	July 15, 2022	978-4-8030-1671-0	November 24, 2025	978-1-7183-1886-1
2	January 16, 2023	978-4-8030-1736-6	March 5, 2026	978-1-7183-1888-5
3	May 15, 2023	978-4-8030-1786-1	July 2, 2026	978-1-7183-1890-8
4	October 18, 2023	978-4-8030-1849-3	September 28, 2026	978-1-7183-1892-2
5	April 17, 2024	978-4-8030-1939-1	December 28, 2026	978-1-7183-1894-6
6	October 17, 2024	978-4-8030-2021-2	—	—
7	April 15, 2025	978-4-8030-2114-1	—	—
8	November 14, 2025	978-4-8030-2217-9	—	—
9	October 15, 2026	978-4-8030-2397-8	—	—

=== Manga ===
A manga adaptation illustrated by Ayahito Kumagai began serialization on Earth Star Entertainment's Comic Earth Star manga website on October 6, 2022. The manga's chapters have been collected in seven tankōbon volumes as of May 2026.

During their panel at Anime Expo 2025, J-Novel Club announced that it had licensed the manga adaptation for English publication.

No.	Original release date	Original ISBN	North American release date	North American ISBN
1	April 12, 2023	978-4-8030-1768-7	September 10, 2025	978-1-7183-8530-6
2	October 12, 2023	978-4-8030-1842-4	December 17, 2025	978-1-7183-8531-3
3	April 12, 2024	978-4-8030-1935-3	February 25, 2026	978-1-7183-8532-0
4	October 11, 2024	978-4-8030-2016-8	June 3, 2026	978-1-7183-8533-7
5	May 9, 2025	978-4-8030-2122-6	September 9, 2026	978-1-7183-8534-4
6	November 12, 2025	978-4-8030-2213-1	December 2, 2026	—
7	May 13, 2026	978-4-8030-2308-4	—	—

=== Anime ===
An anime television series adaptation was announced on October 1, 2026.

== See also ==
- The Frontier Lord Begins with Zero Subjects, a light novel series also illustrated by Kinta
- My Quiet Blacksmith Life in Another World, a light novel series also illustrated by Kinta
- Roll Over and Die, a light novel series also illustrated by Kinta
