= Roll Over and Die =

Japanese novel series and its adaptations

- Roll Over and Die: I Will Fight for an Ordinary Life with My Love and Cursed Sword!
- First light novel volume cover, featuring Flum Apricot (left) and Milkit (right)

「お前ごときが魔王に勝てると思うな」と勇者パーティを追放されたので、王都で気ままに暮らしたい ("Omae Gotoki ga Maō ni Kateru to Omou na" to Yūsha Pāti o Tsuihō Sareta no de, Ōto de Kimama ni Kurashitai)
- Genre: Action; Dark fantasy; Yuri
- Novel series
- Written by: kiki
- Published by: Shōsetsuka ni Narō
- Original run: January 8, 2018 – present
- Light novel
- Written by: kiki
- Illustrated by: Kinta (vol. 1–4); kodamazon (vol. 5–8)
- Published by: Micro Magazine
- English publisher: NA: Seven Seas Entertainment
- Imprint: GC Novels
- Original run: July 30, 2018 – March 30, 2026
- Volumes: 8
- Manga
- Written by: kiki
- Illustrated by: Sunao Minakata
- Published by: Micro Magazine
- English publisher: NA: Seven Seas Entertainment
- Imprint: Ride Comics
- Magazine: Comic Ride
- Original run: December 27, 2018 – present
- Volumes: 8
- Anime television series
- Directed by: Nobuharu Kamanaka
- Produced by: Takayuki Yoneyama; Kimihito Sekido; Hitoshi Sugiura; Cao Cang; Yuuichi Tada; Yuuki Konishi; Takahiro Sasahara; Hiroyasu Katou; Soujirou Arimizu
- Written by: Mariko Kunisawa
- Music by: Ryo Takahashi
- Studio: A.C.G.T
- Licensed by: Crunchyroll
- Original network: Tokyo MX, BS11, AT-X
- Original run: January 9, 2026 – March 27, 2026
- Episodes: 12
- icon

Roll Over and Die: I Will Fight for an Ordinary Life with My Love and Cursed Sword! (Japanese: 「お前ごときが魔王に勝てると思うな」と勇者パーティを追放されたので、王都で気ままに暮らしたい, Hepburn: "Omae Gotoki ga Maō ni Kateru to Omou na" to Yūsha Pāti o Tsuihō Sareta no de, Ōto de Kimama ni Kurashitai; lit. "Banished from the Hero's Party Because They Said 'Don't Think Somebody Like You Can Defeat the Demon Lord', I Want to Live Freely in the Capital") is a Japanese light novel series written by kiki and illustrated by Kinta. It began serialization as a web novel published on the user-generated novel publishing website Shōsetsuka ni Narō in January 2018. Micro Magazine later acquired the series, and began releasing it in print in July 2018 under its GC Novels imprint. The light novel has been licensed for an English-language release by Seven Seas Entertainment.

A manga adaptation with art by Sunao Minakata has been serialized online via Micro Magazine's Comic Ride website since December 2018. The manga has also been licensed for an English-language release by Seven Seas Entertainment. An anime television series adaptation produced by A.C.G.T premiered from January to March 2026.

== Plot ==
Flum Apricot is born with a unique Affinity known as "Reversal" that leaves her with zero stats across the board. However, after being prophesied by the God Origin to join the Hero's party and defeat the Demon Lord, Flum finds herself with what seems like an impossible task. Things only get harder when the party's renowned sage, Jean Inteige, decides to sell her into slavery instead. After being thrown to ghouls for the master's entertainment with nothing but a cursed sword, Flum finally learns the true meaning of her unique "Reversal" Affinity: it reverses magic and stat effects on her, so spells have opposite effects and cursed gear that normally weakens people empowers her. This allows her to escape, and she now seeks to have a normal life.

== Characters ==
=== Main characters ===
Flum Apricot (フラム・アプリコット, Furamu Apurikotto)
Voiced by: Ayaka Nanase (Japanese); Emily Neves (English)
A peasant girl chosen to join the Hero's party, despite having zero stats due to her "Reversal" affinity. Unfortunately, despite trying to be the group's emotional center, her teammate, Jean, deemed her a burden and sold her into slavery behind the other members' backs. However, this ironically leads her to uncover the truth of Reversal—it reverses stat effects so cursed weapons empower her—after which she escapes with fellow slave Milkit and vows to build a new life together, and makes new allies while reuniting with some of her former party members. She is branded with a slave marker, which still remains on her left cheek even after she escaped slavery.
Milkit (ミルキット, Mirukitto)
Voiced by: Miku Itō (Japanese); Reshel Mae (English)
A girl whom Flum met in captivity and took with her when she escaped. Having been a slave her whole life, she is unfamiliar with being free, believing that Flum is now her master. However, she gradually comes out of her shell and even develops romantic feelings for her new mistress. She wears bandages over her face due to her previous owner scarring her, and is too embarrassed to take them off after getting healed.

=== Hero's party ===
Cyrill Sweechka (キリル・スウィーチカ, Kiriru Suwīchika)
Voiced by: Miki Kariya (Japanese); Krystal LaPorte (English)
A peasant girl who awakened as the Hero and was tasked with defeating the Demon Lord alongside a party of chosen individuals. Though initially friends with Flum due to their similar backgrounds, they drifted apart as the discrepancy in their stats grew. After Flum leaves the party, she undergoes a downward spiral from the pressures of her duty and eventually leaves herself. She is one of the members who doesn't reunite with Flum following her departure nor does she know the truth behind her departure.
Jean Inteige (ジーン・インテージ, Jīn Intēji)
Voiced by: Makoto Yasumura (Japanese); Tom Laflin (English)
A sage and a member of the Hero's party. He is an arrogant and narcissistic man who considered Flum a burden and sold her into slavery behind the other members' backs, lying to them that she left willingly, unaware that she escaped. Unfortunately for him, without her as their emotional center, the party gradually falls apart as the other members leave one by one, with some of them learning the truth behind Flum's departure, and it ultimately collapses once the truth is exposed. This left him the only member of the Hero's party.
Eterna Rinebow (エターナ・リンバウ, Etāna Rinbau)
Voiced by: Misaki Kuno (Japanese); Bryn Apprill (English)
A witch and a member of the Hero's party. Though seemingly a teenager, she is actually over sixty years old. After Flum leaves the party, she loses motivation in their mission and eventually leaves herself. This ironically leads her to reunite with Flum after she moves into the same house as her and Milkit, and she learns the truth behind Flum's departure.
Gadhio Lathcutt (ガディオ・ラスカット, Gadio rasukatto)
Voiced by: Takaya Kuroda (Japanese); Cris George (English)
A famous Adventurer and a member of the Hero's party. After Flum leaves the party, he becomes disillusioned with their mission and eventually leaves himself. This ironically leads him to reunite with Flum after he becomes the guild master at the same guild where she now works. He also moves in with Flum and learns the truth behind her departure.
Maria Afenjuns (マリア・アフェンジェンス, Maria Afenjensu)
Voiced by: Aya Endō (Japanese); Brianna Roberts (English)
A saintess and a member of the Hero's party. She is also Sara's master. After Flum leaves the party, while initially believing Jean's lie that she left willingly, she eventually learns the truth and confronts the Sage about it. She most likely left the group after that, but doesn't reunite with Flum.
Linus Radiants (ライナス・レディアンツ, Rainasu Rediantsu)
Voiced by: Jin Ogasawara (Japanese); Aaron Dismuke (English)
An Adventurer and a member of the Hero's party. After Flum leaves the party, while initially believing Jean's lie that she left willingly, he eventually learns the truth and confronts the Sage about it. He most likely left the party after that. Like Cyrill and Maria, he doesn't reunite with Flum.

=== Others ===
Sara Anvilen (セーラ・アンビレン, Sēra Anbiren)
Voiced by: Machico (Japanese); Rebecca Chiara Marano (English)
A naive ten-year-old paladin of the Church of Origin who becomes acquainted with Flum and Milkit. While initially harboring a great hatred toward demons for allegedly burning down her hometown, it is later implied that the Church was the true culprit over religious differences, and that the heroes are mere pawns to their scheme. Once she learns the truth, she lets go of her grudge. Neigass also appears to have developed feelings for her.
Dein Phineas (デイン・フィニアース, Dein Finiāsu)
Voiced by: Masakazu Morita (Japanese); Conner Allison (English)
An Adventurer working at the same guild as Flum. He is a thug who abuses his power as the guild's top adventurer and tries to sabotage Flum's career to eliminate possible competition. He was originally a noble. After being forced out of power, he joined the Church and gained some of Origin's powers. He is eventually killed by Flum, and his heart is used by Eterna to convert Ink into a normal human.
Y'lla Jelicin (イーラ・ジェリシン, Īra Jerishin)
Voiced by: Honoka Inoue (Japanese); Morgan Berry (English)
A receptionist at the Adventurer's guild where Flum works. She looks down at Flum upon meeting her, but soon grows to respect her; however, she is still somewhat protective of her.
Origin
A deity who created the world and granted Flum her Reversal ability. He is later revealed to be the true main antagonist. He is a machine who destroyed an ancient civilization and the demons are guarding his seal to prevent him from being freed.
Leitch Mancathy
A villager who requests help from Flum to save his ill wife.
Welcy Mancathy
Leitch's younger sister. She is a news reporter.
Phil, Grimmie, Quarante, Dolph, and Bitley
Adventurers who work for Dein. Throughout the story, they are either arrested or killed.
Kahnis
Voiced by: Brandon Solis (English)
One of Dein's men, who later betrays him to the guards and becomes the new leader of his gang. He is later killed by Dein.
Badras
A member of Dein's gang.
Neigass (ネイガス, Neigasu)
Voiced by: Ami Koshimizu (Japanese); Lindsay Seidel (English)
A female demon whom the Hero's party encounters. She has connections with Flum. She seems to have developed feelings for Sara.
Stude
The owner of an inn.
Sheitoom
The current Demon Lord and a childhood friend of Tyson and Neigass.
Tsyon
A stuck-up and arrogant demon.
Dhiza
The Demon Lord's butler.
Ed and Jonny
Two knights who work in the town that Flum is currently staying in. They sometimes like to tease Sara. Later, they sacrifice themselves to help Sara escape from dangerous mutating eyeballs.
Ottilie Fohkelpi
Voiced by: Madeleine Norton (English)
A knight who is an old friend of Flum's.
Henriette
A knight whom Ottilie admires.
Ink Wreathcraft
A blind girl who fled from a Church facility. She is currently staying with Flum. She is also revealed to be one of Mother's children. Eterna eventually removes her dark core and puts Dein's heart in its place so she can live as a human.
Mofo
One of Eterna's drones. Ink is the one who named it.
Satils Francois
A wealthy woman who is searching for Ink and Milkit. She has connections to the Church and Mother. She is eventually killed by Mother and Nekt for her failures.
Nekt
Ink's wicked sister and one of Mother's children.
Mother
A malevolent woman who serves the Church. She is Ink and Nekt's mother.

== Media ==
=== Light novels ===
Written by kiki, Roll Over and Die: I Will Fight for an Ordinary Life with My Love and Cursed Sword! first began serialization online on the user-generated novel publishing website Shōsetsuka ni Narō in January 2018. Micro Magazine later acquired the series, and began releasing it in print in July 2018 under their GC Novels imprint. Seven Seas Entertainment licensed the light novels for English-language release in 2020.

| No. | Original release date | Original ISBN | English release date | English ISBN |
|---|---|---|---|---|
| 1 | July 30, 2018 | 978-4-89637-801-6 | September 3, 2020 (e-book); October 27, 2020 (paperback) | 978-1-64505-860-1 |
| 2 | December 21, 2018 | 978-4-89637-847-4 | January 28, 2021 (e-book); March 9, 2021 (paperback) | 978-1-64505-939-4 |
| 3 | July 31, 2019 | 978-4-89637-907-5 | April 29, 2021 (e-book); June 1, 2021 (paperback) | 978-1-64827-088-8 |
| 4 | January 30, 2020 | 978-4-89637-973-0 | June 24, 2021 (e-book); August 3, 2021 (paperback) | 978-1-64827-263-9 |
| 5 | May 30, 2025 (e-book) | — | December 4, 2025 (e-book); January 13, 2026 (paperback) | 979-8-89561-711-3 |
| 6 | August 29, 2025 (e-book) | — | May 26, 2026 (e-book); June 30, 2026 (paperback) | 979-8-89765-820-6 |
| 7 | December 26, 2025 (e-book) | — | November 26, 2026 (e-book); December 29, 2026 (paperback) | 979-8-89863-232-8 |
| 8 | March 30, 2026 (e-book) | — | June 22, 2027 (paperback) | 979-8-90209-020-5 |

=== Manga ===
A manga adaptation is illustrated by Sunao Minakata. It began serialization on Micro Magazine's Comic Ride website on December 27, 2018. It has been also licensed for an English-language release by Seven Seas Entertainment.

| No. | Original release date | Original ISBN | English release date | English ISBN |
|---|---|---|---|---|
| 1 | January 30, 2020 | 978-4-89637-980-8 | March 30, 2021 | 978-1-64827-071-0 |
| 2 | May 28, 2021 | 978-4-89637-980-8 | December 14, 2021 | 978-1-64505-825-0 |
| 3 | February 28, 2022 | 978-4-86716-253-8 | February 28, 2023 | 978-1-64505-825-0 |
| 4 | October 31, 2022 | 978-4-86716-352-8 | September 19, 2023 | 978-1-64827-249-3 |
| 5 | August 31, 2023 | 978-4-86716-461-7 | April 30, 2024 | 979-8-88843-379-9 |
| 6 | May 31, 2024 | 978-4-86716-578-2 | January 21, 2025 | 979-8-89160-653-1 |
| 7 | April 28, 2025 | 978-4-86716-751-9 | January 27, 2026 | 979-8-89561-712-0 |
| 8 | February 27, 2026 | 978-4-86716-918-6 | January 19, 2027 | 979-8-89863-233-5 |

=== Anime ===
An anime television series adaptation was announced on April 28, 2025. It is produced by A.C.G.T and directed by Nobuharu Kamanaka, with Mariko Kunisawa handling series composition, Miki Matsumoto, Fumio Matsumoto, Takashi Fukuyo and Takafumi Furusawa designing the characters, and Ryo Takahashi composing the music. Kikuko Inoue is narrating the series. The series premiered from January 9 to March 27, 2026, on Tokyo MX and BS11. (Note: Tokyo MX and BS11 listed the series premiere on January 8 at 24:30, which is effectively January 9 at 12:30 a.m. JST.) The opening theme song is "Liberator", performed by PassCode, and the ending theme song is "I Need", performed by Yuki Tanaka. Crunchyroll is streaming the series.

==== Episodes ====
| No. | Title | Directed by | Written by | Storyboarded by | Original release date |
|---|---|---|---|---|---|
| 1 | "The Beginning and the End"; Transliteration: "Hajimari to Owari" (Japanese: はじまりとおわり) | Nobuharu Kamanaka | Mariko Kunisawa | Nobuharu Kamanaka | January 9, 2026 |
Though chosen by humanity's deity, Origin, to join the Hero's party and defeat the Demon Lord, Flum has zero stats due to her Affinity—Reversal. Considering her a nuisance, the party's Sage, Jean, sells her into slavery behind the other members' backs. Even worse, the slave trader decides to feed her and the other slaves to ghouls after deeming her a defective product. He at least gives them a sword to defend themselves, but it is cursed to kill anyone with low stats. Preferring to die quickly, Flum grabs the weapon. However, instead of killing her, it heals and empowers her, causing her to realize that Reversal turns negative effects into positive ones. She then kills the ghouls and the trader before escaping with the only other survivor, Milkit, who assumes Flum is now her owner. Finding herself in her country's capital, Flum gains the ability to use Scan and tries registering as an adventurer to afford a living. While the receptionist, Y'lla, does not take her seriously, an A-Ranked adventurer, Dein, offers to register her if she can complete an F-Rank quest. After she leaves; however, it is revealed that Dein actually gave her a D-Rank quest and fully expects her to die.
| 2 | "Coincidence and Fate"; Transliteration: "Gūzen to Unmei" (Japanese: 偶然と運命) | Tsuneo Tominaga | Marihiko Kunisawa | Nobuharu Kamanaka | January 16, 2026 |
Milkit asks why Flum rescued her, to which the latter admits that it was to give herself a reason to live. Arriving at the quest location, Flum realises that Dein duped her upon encountering werewolves, one of which turns on its pack and fuses with them into a chimera with heightened stats using a weird power that twists anything that it touches. Flum fights the abomination, but it continually regenerates and mutates whenever she inflicts any damage, until she finally manages to defeat it by collapsing a bridge onto it. After looting some cursed equipment off a nearby corpse, Flum reunites with Milkit. Struggling with having a master who cares for her, the slave takes off the bandages covering her face to reveal that it is toxin-disfigured. However, Flum accepts her regardless. Afterwards, the guild rewards Flum for defeating the werewolves, much to Dein's annoyance, and she uses the money to afford a meal for herself and Milkit. Meanwhile, Dein learns about the slave trader's death. Elsewhere, Jean claimed to the other Hero's party members that Flum left on her own. Unfortunately, without her as their emotional centre, tensions soon rise within the group.
| 3 | "Purity and Corruption"; Transliteration: "Junshin to Yokoshima" (Japanese: 純真と邪) | Tsuneo Tominaga | Marihiko Kunisawa | Nobuharu Kamanaka | January 23, 2026 |
While shopping with Milkit, Flum stops a theft committed by some of Dein's goons, during which she receives help from Origin Church nun Sara. Returning the stolen items to their owner, Leitch, the merchant begs them to accept an illicit quest: retrieve herbs to cure his ailing wife, which the church outlawed to enforce the use of healing magic. They accept, with Sara not caring about breaking Church law. En route to the quest location, Sara tells Flum about herself: she is from a pagan village that worshipped a different god from Origin, but demons destroyed it. After overnighting with Milkit at a nearby inn, Flum and Sara search for the herbs inside a cave. However, as retribution for interfering with the robbery, Dein sent his men to collapse the entrance, trapping them inside. The cave is then revealed to be inhabited by an ogre bearing the same mutations as the werewolf Flum fought, with its stats saying "Pay for your sins, Flum," forcing the girls to flee further inside. Meanwhile, tensions within the Hero's party start coming to a head when they fail to defeat a powerful demon, which Jean blames on fellow member Eterna.
| 4 | "Darkness and Light"; Transliteration: "Kurayami to Kōmyō" (Japanese: 暗闇と光明) | Tsuneo Tominaga | Marihiko Kunisawa | Nobuharu Kamanaka | January 30, 2026 |
Inside the cave, Flum and Sara stumble upon a hidden laboratory. Exploring it, Flum is shocked to see her name written in a research journal. They then find a faceless woman bearing the same mutations as the ogre from before, just as the said ogre finds them, prompting the girls to flee again. They escape down a corpse-filled pit, where Flum finds more cursed equipment for her to use, but the ogre catches up. Left with no choice but to fight, Flum eventually manages to kill the ogre, only for another one to appear. Fortunately, Neigass, the demon whom the Hero's party fought before, appears and kills it. Recognizing Flum, she then brings her and Sara to safety. While Sara does not trust her due to demons having supposedly destroyed her hometown, Neigass claims that they were not responsible and reveals that the lab belongs to the Church. Afterwards, Neigass removes the boulders blocking the cave's exit while Flum and Sara complete their herb retrieval quest. Meanwhile, back at the inn, Milkit suddenly receives a knock on her door.
| 5 | "Cruelty and Camaraderie"; Transliteration: "Mujō to Yūjō" (Japanese: 無情と友情) | Tsuneo Tominaga | Marihiko Kunisawa | Nobuharu Kamanaka | February 6, 2026 |
Flum and Sara return to the inn to find that Dein's men have taken Milkit hostage, prompting the former to kill them. She then checks on Milkit, but the slave is more concerned about her clothes being damaged, prompting Flum to explain that she cares about her. The next day, Flum and Milkit part ways with Sara after returning to the capital. They then give the retrieved herbs to Leitch, who, in gratitude, gifts them a house. Flum also learns more about the church's dark side from Leitch's journalist sister, Welcy. Examining the house, Flum is shocked to discover that it is already inhabited by Eterna, who quit the Hero's party following her argument with Jean. Telling each other their stories, Flum is overjoyed that her other comrades did not abandon her, while Eterna becomes furious about Jean selling the former into slavery. Flum then requests Eterna to create an antidote for Milkit's toxin-derived disfigurements. Meanwhile, having failed to push further into demon territory, the rest of the Hero's party uses teleportation magic to return to the capital. Elsewhere, Neigass reports to her colleagues about Flum and the Hero's party before showing them the mutated ogres' remains.
| 6 | "An Ordinary Life"; Transliteration: "Kimama ni Kurashitai" (Japanese: 気ままに暮らしたい) | Tsuneo Tominaga | Marihiko Kunisawa | Nobuharu Kamanaka | February 13, 2026 |
As Milkit prepares breakfast, Flum expresses her feelings for her. They and Eterna go shopping and reunite with Sara, who is accompanied by two knights, Ed and Jonny. They are grateful for Flum for catching Dein's men from earlier. After Sara and the knights leave, Flum heads to the guild, but the receptionist warns her against taking anymore jobs as she will become a target if she does them, and Dein is upset that Flum is still alive. Eterna tells Milkit about her past when she and Flum used to be part of the Hero's party, and Flum's presence is what's keeping them together. She also convinces Milkit to express her feelings for Flum. Sara later arrives and joins them for a meal. Sara reveals what she found out about the underground lab, and Eterna suspects that the kingdom is helping the Church. After Sara leaves, Eterna explains how Milkit received her disfigurements and attempts to find a way to cure her. The next morning, Flum finds threatening messages that call Flum a murderer and suspects that this is Dein's doing. A group of rogue knights working suddenly arrive to capture her.
| 7 | "Meetings and Partings"; Transliteration: "Deai to Wakare" (Japanese: 出会いと別れ) | Tsuneo Tominaga | Marihiko Kunisawa | Hideyuki Kimura | February 20, 2026 |
Flum flees with the knights and Dein's men after her. Milkit senses that she is in danger. Dein eventually corners Flum, taking a blind girl hostage to force her to drink poison in exchange for the girl's freedom. However, this fails to kill Flum thanks to her Reversal ability. The rogue knights arrive to help Dein, but a girl named Ottilie Fohkelpi appears and defeats them along with most of Dein's men. As Dein escapes, Ottilie has her men arrest the survivors. Ottilie also recognizes Flum. The girls meet up with Milkit and Eterna, and Ottilie is furious with Jean's actions. Since the blind girl has amnesia, they decide to take care of her for the time being. Ottilie also tells the others about Dein's corruptive actions and past, revealing that he used to be a noble. Sara, who learned of the situation, comes for a visit and they tell Ottilie about the underground lab, Flum's Reversal ability, and the Church's ulterior motives. Ottilie decides to help them on their mission. The girls discover that the blind girl has magical tattoos on her eyes, hinting that she's from the lab. Meanwhile, while swearing vengeance against Flum, Dein is betrayed by one of his men and is told that he is no longer in charge of the West District, but he escapes and comes across his other men, who have been mutated into a large blob.
| 8 | "Budding and Withering"; Transliteration: "Mebuki to Kokatsu" (Japanese: 芽吹きと枯渇) | Tsuneo Tominaga | Marihiko Kunisawa | Tsuneo Tominaga | February 27, 2026 |
The blind girl introduces herself as Ink Wreathcraft and claims that she has no family nor does she remember her background. Still suspicious of where she came from, Flum asks Sara, Ed, and Jonny to investigate, but they turn up with nothing. Flum also asks the guild receptionist, but she too knows nothing about Ink. Flum also learns that Dein has been forced out of power and Kahnis, the thug who betrayed him, is the new leader of his gang. After Flum leaves, a woman arrives at the guild to search for a runaway child. Flum later introduces Ink to Sara, though they also develop a rivalry. They also figure that Flum and Milkit are in a romantic relationship. Flum and Ottilie search for Dein and confront some of his former men before learning that he had joined the Church. They meet up and talk about their discoveries before agreeing to fight for a normal life. That night, Flum jokingly proposes to Milkit and Ink considers herself useless, but the others assure her otherwise. After Milkit’s face is healed, Flum removes her bandages and they start developing romance.
| 9 | "Solitude and Family"; Transliteration: "Kodoku to Kazoku" (Japanese: 孤独と家族) | Tsuneo Tominaga | Marihiko Kunisawa | Hideyuki Kimura | March 6, 2026 |
Despite being healed, Milkit still continues to wear her bandages in public. Eterna sees the romance building up between her and Flum. Flum gets jealous when Ink gets close to Milkit too. Later, Flum discovers a blob of human remains that looks just like the one that Dein saw before. The royal guards arrive to clean it up. Ed and Jonny tell Flum about their discoveries of the Church, meaning that the capital also has a Church facility. Flum remembers her friend Cyril, who is also a member of the Hero's party. Meanwhile, after another failed attempt to reach the demon's lands, the Hero's party return to the capital and Cyril decides to leave out of shame. Maria recalls her past and believes that the demons destroyed her home. Ink talks to Eterna about her drones, naming one Mofo, and Sara talks about her relationship with Ed, Jonny, and Maria. Sometime later, Dein challenges Kahnis, but is killed; however, Dein suddenly revives as his arm mutates and kills Kahnis, but at first, he thinks he killed Flum until he sees the truth. One of Kahnis' men slaughters Dein, only for multiple eyeballs to appear and mutate everyone into a blob. Sara, Ed, and Jonny arrive and upon seeing this, run for it. Jonny and Ed sacrifice themselves to allow Sara to escape from the mutating eyes; however, she fails to get away.
| 10 | "Truth and Reality"; Transliteration: "Shinjitsu to Jijitsu" (Japanese: 真実と事実) | Tsuneo Tominaga | Marihiko Kunisawa | Nobuharu Kamanaka | March 13, 2026 |
With strange fog covering the city, Flum receives a request from the guild regarding the mysterious woman, whose name is Satils Francois, who came to the guild the other day in search for a missing child, revealed to be Ink. Flum also finds the guild mostly empty and is denied entry to the area where Dein and Kahnis fought. She sees what appears to be Sara running down there. Suspecting that something happened to Sara, Flum learns from a pope of Sara's planned execution for apparent treason and continues to see her, Ed, and Jonny running through the fog. Flum goes to find Ottilie, but she is off on a mission and has disappeared. Flum begins blaming herself for what happened to her friends, but Milkit doesn't agree and helps her regain her confidence, causing the fog to disappear. After telling Ink, Eterna, and Milkit about Satils, Ink tells them about her past and her connection to Origin, and Eterna learns that Ink's heart isn't beating. Meanwhile, in the demon realm, the demons wonder where Neigass is and learn that the Hero's party is falling apart after another member had left. While continuing her search for Sara, Flum meets Welcy, who tells her more about Satils. Flum also learns how to use magic. Milkit and Eterna encounter a still-alive Dein, who summons eyeballs to attack them. Eterna creates a water duplicate of Milkit to warn Flum, who wonders outside to find her as the fog resurfaces. She returns home to find Ink dripping the same eyeballs that Dein summoned. She turns to reveal the same mutations as the girl and ogres in the underground lab.
| 11 | "Dein and Flum"; Transliteration: "Dein to Furumu" (Japanese: デインとフラム) | Tsuneo Tominaga | Marihiko Kunisawa | Nobuharu Kamanaka | March 20, 2026 |
Ink's face suddenly returns to normal, but she doesn't remember what happened. Flum suspects this to be the Church's doing and accuses Ink of being a threat, but Ink denies it. Feeling ashamed, Ink runs away. Flum follows her and finds that she has been captured by Dein, who plans to take her back to the Church and reveals that he also captured Milkit and her friends. Flum chases him down, but encounters his men, who are all identified as Godin Torres with the same name and stats. They have been hexed by the Church. Flum fights them while being protected by her Reversal ability. Gadhio, another adventurer who also left the Hero's party, arrives to help her, having been sent by Sara, revealed to be still alive. A masked girl attacks them, revealed to also be mutated. Flum escapes and leaves Gadhio to deal with them. Welcy spots Dein as Flum catches up to him. The two then fight, but Dein proves to be a strong opponent as Flum is unable to harm him. Flum is eventually overpowered. However, her Reversal ability turns the tables and weakens Dein's powers. Not finished yet, Dein summons eyeballs to infect her, but they suddenly stop as they are Ink's will and Ink still sees her as a friend. Flum reveals to Dein that the Church was just using him. Feeling regretful for hurting Ink's feelings, Flum moves in to finish off a now-insane Dein, who then tries one final attempt to defeat Flum, revealing his mutated face, but she manages to kill him for good.
| 12 | "The End and the Beginning"; Transliteration: "Owari to Hajimari" (Japanese: おわりとはじまり) | Tsuneo Tominaga | Marihiko Kunisawa | Nobuharu Kamanaka | March 27, 2026 |
Flum continues her way through the dungeon. Milkit finds herself imprisoned in a secret room with Satils and Ink. Welcy catches up with Flum, having learned about the secret chamber that Milkit is in. As Satils continues to torture Milkit, Flum eventually arrives and saves her and Ink. She then apologizes to Ink for making her upset. Satils is then mysteriously dropped to her death and killed by the zombies below. Nekt, the girl that Flum and Gadhio encountered earlier, arrives with a woman named Mother, who is Ink's real mother. They were the ones who manipulated Satils and Dein, and abducted her friends. Ink refuses to go with Mother and wants to stay with Flum. Though disgusted by this, Mother is interested in Flum's power and she and Nekt escape. Ink wants to live as a normal human, but Flum and Milkit don't know what to do. Welcy, Gadhio, and Eterna find them. Back home, Gadhio learns the truth behind Flum's departure, and reveals that Eterna saved him during his fight with Nekt. They also learn that Neigass saved Sara from the eyeballs and she fell in love with her, but Ed and Jonny didn't survive. That is when Sara got Gadhio to help Flum. The Hero's party was also formed to remove the seal on Origin, who was originally a machine that destroyed a past civilization, and the demons were actually trying to protect the seal. Dein's powers came from Origin and that a traitorous demon was helping Mother and the Church with freeing Origin. Gadhio joined the Hero's party to dig up dirt on the Church's motive. Eterna then performs surgery on Ink to remove her dark core and replace it with Dein's heart so she can become human. Meanwhile, Maria shows Jean a dark core as the party continue to raid the demons' lands. Ottilie is rescued by Henriette, Nekt makes plans to deal with Flum, Sara wakes up in the demons' castle, and Flum begins her next job at the guild.

== Reception ==
Roll Over and Die has received generally positive reviews. Anime News Network giving the first volume an overall B+ grade, with Theron Martin praising the quality of its writing and storytelling when compared of other light novels, though noting that the game mechanics-based setting felt like a crutch.

== See also ==
- The Frontier Lord Begins with Zero Subjects, a light novel series also illustrated by Kinta
- Looks like a Job for a Maid! The Tales of a Dismissed Supermaid, a light novel series also illustrated by Kinta
- My Quiet Blacksmith Life in Another World, a light novel series also illustrated by Kinta
