= Kentarō Kumagai =

Japanese voice actor (born 1994)

- Born: February 16, 1994 (age 32); Saitama Prefecture, Japan
- Occupation: Voice actor
- Agent: Haikyō
- Notable work: Delicious in Dungeon as Laios Touden; The God of High School as Han Daewi; Record of Grancrest War as Theo Cornaro; The Idolmaster SideM as Hideo Akuno
- Height: 174.5 cm (5 ft 9 in)

Kentarō Kumagai (Japanese: 熊谷 健太郎, Hepburn: Kumagai Kentaro; born February 16, 1994) is a Japanese voice actor affiliated with Haikyō. He was born in Saitama and grew up in Okinawa. He voiced Laios Touden from Delicious in Dungeon, Theo Cornaro from Record of Grancrest War, Han Daewi in The God of High School, Omi Fushimi from A3!, and Hideo Akuno from The Idolmaster SideM.

== Biography ==
Kentaro has 2 younger brothers. He lived in Saitama before entering elementary school, then moved to Central Okinawa and lived there until he was 19-years-old.

As a child, Kentaro's aspirations frequently changed, ranging from becoming a soccer player and a school teacher to working as a staff member in a professional wrestling company. He first became aware of voice acting as a profession in the second year of middle school after accidentally watching a music video by Mamoru Miyano on TV, thinking, "This singer is wonderful!" At that time, he only occasionally watched anime and manga, unaware that voice acting was a profession. It was while watching Mamoru Miyano star in "Mobile Suit Gundam 00" that he noticed his name at the top of the credits, sparking an interest in voice acting as a career. This realization led him to think that becoming a voice actor might allow one to experience all the professions they had dreamed of, thereby making voice acting an appealing career choice.

After graduating from Sogo Gakuen Human Academy in 2014, he entered the Haikyo Voice acting Studio. In 2015, he started working at Tokyo Actor's Consumer's Cooperative Society.

His hobbies are soccer, watching professional wrestling, watching baseball, reading and collecting manga. Due to his interest in professional wrestling, he was invited as a guest speaker at DDT Pro-Wrestling in 2021 and 2024.

== Filmography ==
=== TV anime ===
2015

- Mobile Suit Gundam: Iron-Blooded Orphans (2015-2016: Aston Altland, Dios Minco, Karta guards, Makanai Guard)

2016

- Please Tell Me! Galko-chan (Hakase)
- Time Bokan 24 (Momotaro)
- Alderamin on the Sky (Iriq Bauza)
- BBK/BRNK (Angus Wun)

2017

- Tsuki ga Kirei (Tsubasa Kaneko)
- Tsuredure Children (Haruhiko Takase)
- Knight's & Magic (Stephen)
- Idolmaster SideM (Hideo Akuno)

2018

- Record of Grancrest War (Theo Cornaro)
- Hinomaru Sumo (Yuma Gojo)
- Idolmaster SideM: Wake Atte Mini! (Hideo Akuno)

2020

- number24 (Makoto Someya)
- The Millionaire Detective Balance: Unlimited (Shinnosuke Kamei)
- A3! (Omi Fushimi)
- The God of High School (Han Daewi)
- Get Up! Get Live! #Gera Gera (Kazuma Komae)
- Ikebukuro West Gate Park (Makoto Majima)
- Noblesse (Rajak Kertia)
- Drifting Dragon (Gaga)

2021

- Yo-kai Watch Jam - Yo-kai Academy Y: Close Encounters of the N Kind (Oujirou Susano)
- Tsukipro the Animation 2 (Hiro Yuzuki)

2022

- Tribe Nine (Hyakutarō Senju)
- Aoashi (Ryūichi Takeshima)
- Lucifer and the Biscuit Hammer (Dance Dark)
- Welcome to Demon School! Iruma-kun Season 3 (Ichiro Androalphus)

2023

- The Tale of the Outcasts (Takenami)
- Demon Slayer: Kimetsu no Yaiba – Swordsmith Village Arc
- The Great Cleric (Geordo)

2024

- Delicious in Dungeon (Laios Touden)
- Tasūketsu (Hayato Sōma)
- Quality Assurance in Another World (Kuro-chan)
- Tower of God 2nd Season (Chang Blarode)
- 365 Days to the Wedding (Takuya Ohara)
- Demon Lord, Retry! R (Zero Kirisame)

2025

- Okinawa de Suki ni Natta Ko ga Hōgen Sugite Tsurasugiru (Isao Shimoji)
- I May Be a Guild Receptionist, But I'll Solo Any Boss to Clock Out on Time (Jade Scrade)
- Catch Me at the Ballpark! (Miku's father)
- Summer Pockets (Ryoichi Mitani)
- Me and the Alien MuMu (Tamotsu Rokugo)
- The Dark History of the Reincarnated Villainess (Shukuna)

2026

- Yoroi-Shinden Samurai Troopers (Shion Ishida)
- Dead Account (Ikko Owada)
- In the Clear Moonlit Dusk (Shun Kuwabatake)
- Rich Girl Caretaker (Katsuya Taishō)
- The Frontier Lord Begins with Zero Subjects (Zorg)
- From Far Away (Izark Kia Tarj)

2027

- Kindergarten Wars (Doug)

=== Original video animation (OVA) ===
- Yarichin Bitch Club (2018, Jimmy)

=== Web animation ===
2020

- Hallelujah -Unmei no Sentaku (Syura)
- Yoshimaho (Jun)

=== Digital comic ===
- dTV Ousama no Viking (2018, Warai neko)
- Aniki no Tomodachi (2021, Ken Kakimoto)

=== Video games ===
2015

- Idolmaster SideM (Hideo Akuno)

2016

- Soul Worker (Jite)
- Ikemen Revolution: Love and Magic in Wonderland (Zero)
- For Whom the Alchemist Exist (Raegen, Nasario)
- Yūkyu no Tia Blade: Lost Chronicle (Fou)

2017

- A3! (Omi Fushimi）
- Quiz RPG Mahotukai to Kuroneko no Wiz *Elrow Guiro)
- Yukyu no Tia Blade: Fragments of Memory (Fou)
- Akane Sasu Sekai de Kimi to Utau (Issa Kobayashi)
- Idolmaster SideM LIVE ON ST@GE! (Hideo Akuno)

2018

- Shin Megami Tensei: Liberation Dx2 (Vagit Chukhovf)
- Genei Monogatari (Jiang Wei, Gan Ning, Xu Chu)）
- Summer Pockets (Mitani Ryoichi)
- Record of Grancest (Theo Cornero)）
- Record of Grancest: Senran no Shijuso (Theo Cornero)
- Idol Fantasy (Soma Kanon)
- Shinen Resist (Frost)）

2019

- Op8 (Itsuki Reizei)
- Choice×Darling (Subaru Haizaki)
- Caravan Stories (Felix)
- Generation Crossrays (Aston Altland)
- Hoshinari Echoes (Tachibana Ichijo)）

2020

- Grimms Notes (Esel)
- Summer Pockets Reflection Blue (Ryoichi Mitani)）
- Show By Rock!! Fes A Live (Gashi Gashi)
- Touken Ranbu (Chiganemaru)
- Dotokoi (Masamune Nikaidou)
- Hero Cantare (Han Daewi)

2021

- Idolmaster Pop Links (Hideo Akuno)
- Isekai ni Tensei Shitara Densetsu no Yuusha (Uke) Deshita (Leon)
- La Corda d'Oro: Starlight Orchestra(Minami Otome)
- Yumeokoku to Nemureru 100nin no Oujisama (Subaru)

2026

- Arknights (Bellone)

2027

- Honkai: Nexus Anima (Herocrates)

=== Drama CD ===
- Mobile Suit Gundam: Iron-Blooded Orphans EPISODE DRAMA 1 (2017, Aston Altland)
- Koi Suru Sharehoues 5: Which do You Choose? (2018, Koji Aoyama)）
- Summer Pockets (2018, Mitani Ryoichi）
- Kiss de Kimi wo Tokasumade Ikemen Futari ni Semararete Office (2019, Mamoru Ijūin )
- Otogi no Uta: Chronicle (2019, Inutake)
- Momotroop Otogi no Uta: Chronicle Liberty (2019)
- Dryadroid (2019, Blan)）
- Get Up! Get Live! Steam Rising (2019, Kazuma Komae)
- Spy Hyakkaten (2020 Yukio Igari)

=== BLCD ===
- Yarichin Bitch Club series (2017–2019, Jimmy)
  - Yarichin Bitch Club
  - Yarichin Bitch Club 2
  - Yarichin Bitch Club 3
  - Yarichin Bitch Club 4
- Yome ni Konaika (Shujiro Sonozaki)

2018

- Watashi no Shiranai Karera no Himitu 2 (Sota Nishiyama)
- Sayonara alpha (Ogihara Ototo )

2019

- No Color Baby (Daichi Kirijima)
- Boai Friendship (Kotaro Akiyama)
- Kimi to Boku no Sekai no Hotori series (Sosuke Sena)
  - Phrase2 Mayoi Koi Valentine
  - Phrase3 Kataomoi Sotsugyo
- Okamikun wa Kowakunai (2019–2020, Shiro Hoezaki)
  - Thoroughbred wa Nabikanai
- Sahara no Kurohashi (2019-2020, Roki)
  - Sahara no Kurohashi 2 Side Alkil
- Kirai janai kedo Ningen tte Kowai! (Yoritomo Isomata)
- Lost Virgin (Matusaka Keishi)
- Karera no Koi no Yukue wo Tada Hitasura ni Mimamoru CD: Danshi Kokosei Hajimete no series (2019-2021, Ichiya Aikawa)
  - Amaetagari King to Sewayaki Jack
  - 4th After Disc: Just You!
- Asami Kun wa Gachi Koi Janai (Masatoki Sahashi)

2020

- A ga Awo Daku Hoho (Ryuka Kitaumi)
- Goriyo wa Keikakuteki ni (Makoto Kanezo)
- Cupid ni Rakurai Tuigeki (Kazuaki)
- Love me My Dog (Aiichiro Enomoto)
- Abarenbo Honey(Moriyama Takuma, Kuma)）
- Kirai de Isate (2020-2021, Murasame)
  - Kirai de Isate 2

2021

- Yamashi Koi no Hajimekata (Kentaro Araki)）
- Aisaregatari no Surface (Onoda)
- Reverse (Shiro Washinuma)
- H wa Shu 7 Kibo desu! (Iori Kurose)）
- Sandrion no Kuroi Kawagutu (Ayumu Haibara)
- Tondemonai Ore no A ( Rin Inoshishiza)
- Sukini Shitai yo (Masumi)

2022

- Kamisama nanka Shinjinai Bokura no Eden (Takai Shikito)

=== Dubbing ===
==== Live-action ====
- The Expanding Universe of Ashley Garcia (2020, Stick)
- Euphoria (2021, Ethan)
- Wednesday (2022, Xavier Thorpe)

==== Animation ====
- Abominable (2020, Jin)

== Discography ==
=== Character songs ===
Release date	Product name	Name of the Character/Group	Song	Notes
2016
Jan 27	THE IDOLM@STER SideM ST@RTING LINE -08 FRAME	FRAME	"Yuukan naru Kimihe" "Mission is Peaceful!" "Drive a Live"	Idol Master side M related song
2017
Feb 1	Beyond The Dream	315 production Idol	"Beyond The Dream"	Idol Master side M theme song
June 28	A3! First AUTUMN EP	Aki Gumi	"oneXone"	A3! related song
Oct 18	THE IDOLM@STER SideM ORIGIN@L PIECES 08	Hideo Akuno	"Heartful Patroller"	Idol Master side M related song
Nov 1	A3! Blooming AUTUMN EP	Wolf	"Just For myself"	A3! related song
Nov 1	A3! Blooming AUTUMN EP	Omi Fushimi	"Finder Goshi no Kizuna"	A3! related song
2018
Feb 24	THE IDOLM@STER SideM 3rd ANNIVERSARY DISC 02 FRAME & もふもふえん & F-LAGS	315 production Idol	"Swing Your Leave"	Game Idol Master side M related song
Feb 24	THE IDOLM@STER SideM 3rd ANNIVERSARY DISC 02 FRAME & もふもふえん & F-LAGS	315 production Idol	"Compass Gripper!!!"	Game Idol Master side M related song
Feb 24	THE IDOLM@STER SideM 3rd ANNIVERSARY SOLO COLLECTION 02	Hideo Akuno	"Swing Your Leaves"	Game Idol Master side M related song
May 9	THE IDOLM@STER SideM WORLD TRE@SURE 01	Hideo Akuno	"Eien naru Yon jushi" "MEET THE WORLD!（FRANCE Ver."	Idol Master Side M LIVE ON ST@GE! song
Aug 15	Touch You	Shiritu Morimori Gakuen Seishun Danshi	"Touch You"	OVA Yarichin Bitch Club Opening Song
Aug 15	Touch You	Jimmy	"Touch You"	OVA Yarichin Bitch Club related song
Nov 7	Yarichin Bitch Club Character song series Ichigo Aji	Jimmy	"Mellow mellow Lily"	OVA Yarichin Bitch Club related song
Nov 7	A3! VIVID AUTUMN EP	Aki Gumi	"SECOND SHOT"	Game A3! related song
Dec	THE IDOLM@STER SideM WakeMini! MUSIC COLLECTION 03	315 Stars	"POKER FAITH -"	TV Anime "Idol Master Side M Riyuu Atte Mini!" ending theme
2019
May 15	THE IDOLM@STER SideM WakeMini! SOLO COLLECTION 03 INTELLIGENCE Ver.	Hideo Akuno	"POKER FAITH-"	TV Anime "Idol Master Side M Riyuu Atte Mini!" related song
May 10	THE IDOLM@STER SideM 4th ANNIVERSARY DISC"LIVE in your SMILE / DREAM JOURNEY"	ASTRAGALUS	"LIVE in your SMILE"	Game Idol Master side M related song
Jul 24	A3! BRIGHT AUTUMN EP	Huey	"Muddy Hero"	Game A3! related song
Jul 24	A3! BRIGHT AUTUMN EP	Akigumi	"Ever☆Blooming!"	Game A3! related song
Oct 16	GANG x Rock Koui Soudatsu tournament Entary 03 ASTRAGALUS	ASTRAGALUS	"Bet, the Dead" "Yukoku"	Game Idol Master side M related song
Oct 16	GANG x Rock Koui Soudatsu tournament Entary 03 ASTRAGALUS	\Ginjiro Kimura	"Bet, the Dead (Kimura Ginjiro Solo Ver.)"	Game Idol Master side M related song
Oct 23	Best Game 2 ~Meiun wo kakeru trigger~	Hideo Akuno	"ALL nOR NOTHING"	Game Idol Master side M related song
Nov 6	GETUP! GETLIVE! Steam Rising	Kazuma Komae	"GET UP! GET LIVE!"	GETUP! GETLIVE!theme song
Dec 18	THE IDOLM@STER SideM 5th ANNIVERSARY DISC 01 PRIDE STAR	315 All Stars	"PRIDE STAR" "DRIVE A LIVE" "Reason!!" "GLORIOUS RO@D"	Game Idol Master side M related song
Dec 18	A3! MIX SEASONS LP	Omi Fushimi	"Sorachika"	Game A3! related song
Dec 25	ReFlap Startup Song Entertain limited edition	Reiji Kujakusei	"Entertain"	ReFlap related song
Dec 25	ReFlap Startup Song Entertain limited edition	Reiji Kujakuesi	"Entertain" "Moment"	ReFlap related song
2020
Mar 6	THE IDOLM@STER SideM 5th ANNIVERSARY UNIT COLLECTION -PRIDE STAR-	FRAME	"PRIDE STAR"	Game Idol Master side M related song
Mar 18	THE IDOLM@STER SideM 5th ANNIVERSARY DISC 04 FRAME&S.E.M&Legenders	FRAME	"Three Breath"	Game Idol Master side M related song
Mar 18	THE IDOLM@STER SideM 5th ANNIVERSARY DISC 04 FRAME&S.E.M&Legenders	FRAME	"Bet your intuition!"	Game Idol Master side M related song
Jul 1	ReFlap Rising RePlayers'Collection	Reiji Kujakusei	"Diamonds"	ReFlap related song
Jul 1	ReFlap Rising RePlayers'Collection	Reiji Kujakusei	"Spotlight"	ReFlap related song
Aug 25	THE IDOLM@STER SideM 5th ANNIVERSARY SOLO COLLECTION 03	Hideo Akuno	"Sleeplessス"	Game Idol Master side M related song
Aug 25	Spy Hyakkatten Music&Drama CD Order#1	Yukio Igari	"Truth or Lie"	Drama CD Spy Hyakkaten related song
Sep 19	Idol Master Side M Struggle Heart Volume 2 special edition CD D	FRAME	"Kassai~Kacho Fuugetu~"	Comic Book Idol Master Side M Struggle Heart related song
Nov 25	ZERO LIMIT/Thawing	Aki Gumi	"ZERO LIMIT"	Anime A3! related song
2021
Feb 7	THE IDOLM@STER SideM UNIT COLLECTION -MEET THE WORLD!-	315 All Stars	"MEET THE WORLD!"	Game Idol Master side M related song
Feb 7	THE IDOLM@STER SideM UNIT COLLECTION -MEET THE WORLD!-	FRAME	"MEET THE WORLD!"	Game Idol Master side M related song
May 3	THE IDOLM@STER SideM NEW STAGE EPISODE:11 FRAME	FRAME	"Living Eyes Hero" "NEXT STAGE!"	Game Idol Master side M related song
May 24	A3! EVER LASTING LP	Kondo Takashi/Fushimi Omi	"Hungry Neighbors"	Game A3! related song
Apr 15	AWAKE	Genjiro Chihara	"AWAKE"	Character CD HANDEAD ANTHEMrelated song
June 11	Go up	ALBA	"Go up"	Character CD HANDEAD ANTHEMrelated song
June 30	La Corda d'Oro Starlight Orchestra 5 Step Up ~Nakijin Koukou~	Otome Minami	"Ha＊Na＊Ma＊Ru"	La Corda d'Oro Starlight Orchestra tep Up related song
Jul 14	SCREAM	Shura Jodo	"SCREAM"	Character CD HANDEAD ANTHEM related song
Sep 15	GETUP! GETLIVE! For seasoning	Kazuma Komae	"OWARAI BANZAI"	Get Up! Get Live related song
Sep 29	THE IDOLM@STER SideM GROWING SIGN@L 01 Growing Smiles!	315 All Stars	"Growing Smiles!" "DRIVE A LIVE" "Beyond The Dream" "NEXT STAGE!"	Game Idol Master Side M Growing Sign related song

=== Other related songs ===
Release date	Product name	Unit Name	Song	Reference
2019 Nov 25	GO5!GOALOUS5!	GOLAOUS5	"GO5!GOALOUS5!" "Let's GOALOUS5!!"	"GOALOUS5"Theme Song
2019 Nov 25	5 AHEAD!	GOLAOUS5	"5 AHEAD!" "RosyBeat"	"GOALOUS5"Theme Song
