= Yosuke Asari =

Japanese actor (born 1987)

- 浅利 陽介
- Born: 14 August 1987 (age 38); Tokyo, Japan
- Occupation: Actor
- Years active: 1994-present
- Notable work: Films; Negative Happy Chainsaw Edge; GS Wonderland; Randies; Always Zoku Sanchōme no Yūhi; Tenohira no Shiawase; Stage; Kisaragi; Odokumi; Ōten
- Television: Kids War: Zaken na yo; Shinsengumi!; Tiger & Dragon; Code Blue; Rescue: Tokubetsu Kōdo Kyūjotai
- Website: Profile

Yosuke Asari (浅利 陽介, Asari Yōsuke; born 14 August 1987, in Tokyo) is a Japanese actor. He is represented with Beacon Lab Entertainment.

== Biography ==
When he was young Asari danced to his parents' clapping after watching Charlie Chaplin's films and joined Gekidan Tohai, and debuted at the age of four in a television advertisement, and later he became a child actor. Afterward he moved to Beacon Lab Entertainment.

In 1999, Asari played the childhood role of the heroine's rival (Shusaku Tsuda, Hakase) in the Asadora Asuka, and he played the young Giraffe, the main character of the film Eien no Ko in 2000, and he continues to act in dramas since his childhood.

In 2001, he gained attention when he played the juvenile delinquent Ippei in Kids War 3.

Asari made his first leading role in a film was Tenohira no Shiawase, and his first starring role in a television drama in Hitori janai the following year.

On 17 December 2015, it was reported that he married a non-celebrity woman who was his classmate in university.

== Filmography ==
=== Television ===
Year	Title	Role	Notes	Ref(s)
1996	Hideyoshi	Ukita Hideie (young)	Taiga drama	
2001–03	Kids War	Ippei Kazama	Seasons 3 and 5	
2002	HR	Suma-chokuretsu		
2008	AIBOU: Tokyo Detective Duo			
2008–17	Code Blue	Kazuo Fujikawa	3 seasons	
2014	Gunshi Kanbei	Kobayakawa Hideaki	Taiga drama	
2015	Mōsō Kanojo	Keisuke Takashima		
2016	Hyakunen no Kei, Wareni Ari	Nozono Shiono	Television film	
2016	Sanada Maru	Kobayakawa Hideaki	Taiga drama	
2020	Awaiting Kirin	Matsudaira Hirotada	Taiga drama	
2020	Detective Yuri Rintaro	Kyosuke Nagoshi		
2022	Bakumatsu Aibō-den	Mutsu Yōnosuke	Television film	
2024	Happy of the End	Maya		

=== Films ===
Year	Title	Role	Notes	Ref.
2004	Be with You	Takumi Aki (young)		
2016	Kōfuku no Alibi: Picture			
2022	Wedding High	Sōsuke Makabe		
2023	Kingdom 3: The Flame of Destiny	Ya Men		
2023	Confess to Your Crimes			
2023	The Pearl Legacy			
2024	Samurai Detective Onihei: Blood for Blood	Kimura Chugo		

=== Stage ===
Year	Title	Role	Notes	Ref.
2015	Kuroi Handkerchief	Miyashita		
2016	Cresida	Steven		
