= Oretachi Maji-kō Destroy =

Japanese manga series

- First tankōbon volume cover

俺たちマジ校デストロイ (Oretachi Maji-kō Desutoroi)
- Genre: Coming-of-age; Comedy
- Manga
- Written by: Marmelo Tanaka
- Published by: Enterbrain
- Imprint: B's Log Comics
- Magazine: B's Log Cheek
- Original run: April 12, 2017 – present
- Volumes: 6

Oretachi Maji-kō Destroy (俺たちマジ校デストロイ, Oretachi Maji-kō Desutoroi) is a Japanese manga series written and illustrated by Marmelo Tanaka. It began serialization on Enterbrain's B's Log Cheek section on the pixiv Comic website in April 2017. Its chapters have been collected in six volumes as of February 2022.

== Characters ==
Tomo
Voiced by: Shintarō Asanuma (MV)
Niina
Voiced by: KENN (MV)
Megu
Voiced by: Natsuki Hanae (MV)
Kisuke
Voiced by: Wataru Urata (MV)
Miyu
Voiced by: Jin Ogasawara (MV)
Jun
Voiced by: Yoshiki Murakami (MV)
Yukkii
Voiced by: Takao Mitsutomi (MV)

== Media ==
=== Manga ===
Written and illustrated by Marmelo Tanaka, Oretachi Maji-kō Destroy began serialization on Enterbrain's B's Log Cheek section on the pixiv Comic website on April 12, 2017. Its chapters have been collected in six volumes as of February 2022.

No.	Japanese release date	Japanese ISBN
1	September 30, 2017	978-4-04-734859-2; 978-4-04-734860-8 (SE)
2	May 1, 2018	978-4-04-735061-8
3	December 28, 2018	978-4-04-735442-5
4	August 30, 2019	978-4-04-735722-8
5	April 1, 2021	978-4-04-736546-9
6	February 28, 2022	978-4-04-736948-1

=== Stage play ===
A stage play was held in Tokyo Theater 1010 from March 21 to 30, 2019.

=== Other ===
Multiple CDs consisting of music performed by the Maji-kō Destroy idol group were released on January 10, 2018, and on April 3, 2019.

An anime music video animated by MAPPA commemorating the release of volume 5 was released on April 1, 2021.

== See also ==
- Happy of the End, another manga series by the same creator under the pseudonym Ogeretsu Tanaka
- Yarichin Bitch Club, another manga series by the same creator under the pseudonym Ogeretsu Tanaka
