= My Quiet Blacksmith Life in Another World =

Japanese light novel series

- First light novel volume cover

鍛冶屋ではじめる異世界スローライフ (Kajiya de Hajimeru Isekai Surō Raifu)
- Genre: Isekai, slice of life
- Novel series
- Written by: Tamamaru
- Published by: Shōsetsuka ni Narō
- Original run: December 18, 2018 – present
- Light novel
- Written by: Tamamaru
- Illustrated by: Kinta
- Published by: Fujimi Shobo
- English publisher: NA: J-Novel Club
- Imprint: Kadokawa Books
- Original run: December 10, 2019 – present
- Volumes: 14
- Manga
- Written by: Tamamaru
- Illustrated by: Yoshino Himori
- Published by: ASCII Media Works
- English publisher: NA: J-Novel Club
- Imprint: Dengeki Comics NEXT
- Magazine: Dengeki Comic Regulus
- Original run: July 3, 2020 – present
- Volumes: 6

My Quiet Blacksmith Life in Another World (鍛冶屋ではじめる異世界スローライフ, Kajiya de Hajimeru Isekai Surō Raifu) is a Japanese light novel series written by Tamamaru and illustrated by Kinta. It began serialization on the user-generated novel publishing website Shōsetsuka ni Narō in December 2018. It was later acquired by Fujimi Shobo who began publishing it under their Kadokawa Books light novel imprint in December 2019. A manga adaptation illustrated by Yoshino Himori began serialization in ASCII Media Works' Dengeki Comic Regulus magazine in July 2020.

== Plot ==
After a middle-aged white-collar worker named Eizo is hit by a truck while attempting to save a stray cat, the cat reveals itself to be an entity with god-like powers, and grants him a reincarnation in a fantasy world. While Eizo wishes to have a relaxing life as a blacksmith alongside a pet cat, his blacksmithing abilities are overpowered, and he begins living with a tiger-like girl instead of a pet.

== Characters ==
Eizo (エイゾウ, Eizō)
Samya (サーミャ, Sāmya)
Voiced by: Mikako Komatsu (voice drama)
Rike (リケ)
Voiced by: Aya Uchida (voice drama)
Diana (ディアナ)
Voiced by: Satomi Akesaka (voice drama)
Lidy (リディ, Ridi)
Voiced by: Sayaka Senbongi (voice drama)

== Media ==
=== Light novel ===
Written by Tamamaru, My Quiet Blacksmith Life in Another World began serialization on the user-generated novel publishing website Shōsetsuka ni Narō on December 18, 2018. It was later acquired by Fujimi Shobo who began publishing it as a light novel with illustrations by Kinta on December 10, 2019. Fourteen volumes have been released as of July 2026.

During their Anime NYC 2021 panel, J-Novel Club announced that they licensed the light novels for English publication. J-Novel Club are also releasing audiobook versions.

No.	Original release date	Original ISBN	English release date	English ISBN
1	December 10, 2019	978-4-04-073412-5	February 16, 2022 (digital); December 9, 2025 (print)	978-1-71-838997-7 (digital); 978-1-71-834509-6 (print)
2	July 10, 2020	978-4-04-073696-9	May 4, 2022 (digital); January 13, 2026 (print)	978-1-71-838999-1 (digital); 978-1-71-834511-9 (print)
3	October 10, 2020	978-4-04-073826-0	July 20, 2022 (digital); February 10, 2026 (print)	978-1-71-839001-0 (digital); 978-1-71-834513-3 (print)
4	May 8, 2021	978-4-04-074084-3	October 12, 2022 (digital); March 10, 2026 (print)	978-1-71-839003-4 (digital); 978-1-71-834515-7 (print)
5	November 10, 2021	978-4-04-074303-5	December 28, 2022 (digital); April 13, 2026 (print)	978-1-71-839005-8 (digital); 978-1-71-834517-1 (print)
6	May 9, 2022	978-4-04-074517-6	March 24, 2023 (digital); May 11, 2026 (print)	978-1-71-839007-2 (digital); 978-1-71-834519-5 (print)
7	December 9, 2022	978-4-04-074791-0; 978-4-04-074793-4 (SE)	August 30, 2023 (digital); June 9, 2026 (print)	978-1-71-839009-6 (digital); 978-1-71-834521-8 (print)
8	July 10, 2023	978-4-04-075032-3	December 20, 2023 (digital); July 14, 2026 (print)	978-1-71-839011-9 (digital); 978-1-71-834523-2 (print)
9	January 10, 2024	978-4-04-075291-4; 978-4-04-075292-1 (SE)	September 11, 2024 (digital); August 11, 2026 (print)	978-1-71-839013-3 (digital); 978-1-71-834525-6 (print)
10	July 10, 2024	978-4-04-075537-3	March 24, 2025 (digital); September 8, 2026 (print)	978-1-71-839015-7 (digital); 978-1-71-834527-0 (print)
11	January 10, 2025	978-4-04-075758-2; 978-4-04-075759-9 (SE)	August 4, 2025 (digital); December 8, 2026 (print)	978-1-71-839017-1 (digital); 978-1-71-834529-4 (print)
12	July 10, 2025	978-4-04-075987-6	May 22, 2026 (digital); March 9, 2027 (print)	978-1-71-839019-5 (digital); 978-1-71-834531-7 (print)
13	January 9, 2026	978-4-04-076243-2; 978-4-04-076244-9 (SE)	—	—
14	July 10, 2026	978-4-04-076461-0	—	—
15	January 8, 2027	978-4-04-076720-8; 978-4-04-076721-5 (SE)	—	—

=== Manga ===
A manga adaptation illustrated by Yoshino Himori began serialization on ASCII Media Works' Dengeki Comic Regulus manga website on July 3, 2020. The manga's chapters have been compiled into six tankōbon volumes as of December 2025. The manga adaptation is also licensed in English by J-Novel Club.

No.	Original release date	Original ISBN	North American release date	North American ISBN
1	February 27, 2021	978-4-04-913649-4	June 12, 2024	978-1-71-832784-9
2	September 27, 2021	978-4-04-913975-4	September 4, 2024	978-1-71-832785-6
3	August 26, 2022	978-4-04-914593-9	November 27, 2024	978-1-71-832786-3
4	September 27, 2023	978-4-04-915282-1	February 19, 2025	978-1-71-832787-0
5	December 10, 2024	978-4-04-916051-2	July 23, 2025	978-1-71-832788-7
6	December 26, 2025	978-4-04-916909-6	—	—

== See also ==
- The Frontier Lord Begins with Zero Subjects, a light novel series also illustrated by Kinta
- Looks like a Job for a Maid! The Tales of a Dismissed Supermaid, a light novel series also illustrated by Kinta
- Roll Over and Die, a light novel series also illustrated by Kinta
