= Get Up! Get Live! =

Japanese media mix project

- Anime television series
- Directed by: 88
- Written by: Takashi Ikufube
- Studio: Spellbound
- Original network: MBS, TBS
- Original run: July 10, 2020 – September 11, 2020
- Episodes: 10

Get Up! Get Live! (stylized as GETUP! GETLIVE!) is a Japanese media mix project developed by MBS centered on comedy. The concept is developed by Seitarō Mukai from the comedy duo Tenshin and written by Wataru Watari. The series aired from July 10 to September 11, 2020, on the Super Animeism block.

== Plot ==
Several aspiring comedians who join SSS, a talent agency, in hopes of becoming the greatest entertainers in Japan, while facing rejection and jealousy during their struggles.

== Characters ==
=== Stardust ===
Junya Uehara (上原 淳也, Uehara Junya)
Voiced by: Natsuki Hanae
Kaede Higashizawa (東沢 楓, Higashizawa Kaede)
Voiced by: Koutaro Nishiyama

=== Kikuichimonji ===
Sena Machida (町田 瀬那, Machida Sena)
Voiced by: Toshiyuki Toyonaga
Toranosuke Ōno (大野 虎之助, Ōno Toranosuke)
Voiced by: Kaito Ishikawa

=== 6 ===
Ren Kitami (喜多見 蓮, Kitami Ren)
Voiced by: Yōhei Azakami
Kazuma Komae (狛江 一馬, Komae Kazuma)
Voiced by: Kentarō Kumagai

=== Hayashima ===
Azuma Hayashima (早島 雷, Hayashima Azuma)
Voiced by: Kōhei Amasaki
Nakaba Hayashima (早島 央, Hayashima Nakaba)
Voiced by: Gakuto Kajiwara

=== Other characters ===
Nanao Karakida (上原 淳也, Karakida Nanao)
Voiced by: Katsuyuki Konishi

== Development ==
The concept is developed by Seitarō Mukai from the comedy duo Tenshin and written by Wataru Watari. The project was first revealed in March 2019, with the voice actors' first live stand-up event taking place on May 18, 2019. Their second stand-up event took place on February 2 and February 9, 2020.

== Media ==
=== Anime ===
A television anime adaptation was announced in April 2020 and aired from July 10 to September 11, 2020, on the Super Animeism programming block on MBS and TBS. The series is directed by 88 and written by Takashi Ifukube. The music direction is handled by Taka and the animation is produced by Spellbound. Episode 0 of the series was broadcast on July 3, 2020.

=== Manga ===
Two manga adaptations of the series were launched in the magazines Comic Zero Sum and Zero-Sum Online.
