= Happy of the End =

Japanese manga series and its adaptation(s)

- Cover of vol. 1 of the Japanese version, released on June 16, 2021

ハッピー・オブ・ジ・エンド (Happī Obu Ji Endo)
- Genre: Romance, thriller, boys' love
- Manga
- Written by: Ogeretsu Tanaka
- Published by: Takeshobo
- English publisher: NA: Kuma
- Imprint: Bamboo Comics Qpa Collection
- Magazine: Qpa
- Original run: January 24, 2020 – August 24, 2023
- Volumes: 3
- Television drama
- Directed by: Tomoyuki Furumaya; Takahiro Komura
- Written by: Tomoyuki Furumaya; Miako Tadano
- Music by: Kōji Endō
- Studio: NBCUniversal Entertainment Japan
- Licensed by: GagaOOLala
- Original network: Fuji TV; Fuji TV On Demand
- Original run: September 3, 2024 – September 24, 2024
- Episodes: 8
- icon

Happy of the End (Japanese: ハッピー・オブ・ジ・エンド, Hepburn: Happī Obu Ji Endo) is a Japanese manga series by Ogeretsu Tanaka. It was serialized in the monthly boys' love digital manga magazine Qpa from January 24, 2020, to October 24, 2023. A live-action television drama adaptation was broadcast on Fuji TV from September 3, 2024, to September 24, 2024.

== Plot ==
Disowned by his family for being gay and rejected by his recently married ex-boyfriend, Chihiro Kashiwagi meets Keito, a beautiful and mysterious man, at a bar, and suggests they have a one-night stand. However, at the hotel, Keito beats Chihiro unconscious. The next morning, Keito reveals that he was sent by Matsuki, Chihiro's former patron, to take back his cards after Chihiro had stolen them upon being evicted for sleeping with other men. With no place to live, Chihiro ends up staying with Keito.

While living with each other as friends with benefits, Chihiro and Keito grow closer to each other and open up about their pasts: Chihiro tells Keito about his family and his failed aspirations of becoming a photographer. Meanwhile, Keito reveals that his real name is Haoran and that his drug-addicted mother is a prostitute who came from China; in addition, when he was 15, he worked as a prostitute with violent clients. Later, when Chihiro's ex-boyfriend tries to convince Chihiro to start dating again, Chihiro realizes he treasures his relationship with Haoran more, and that his ex-boyfriend never loved him. Haoran goes into his slump after his mother dies and contemplates suicide, but he realizes he wants to live because Chihiro is with him. After finding closure with their pasts, Chihiro and Haoran decide to live together happily as a couple.

Chihiro and Haoran's happiness is short-lived when Maya, an abusive pimp who Haoran previously worked for, begins stalking them. Haoran fears Maya is targeting him after the former had previously gotten the latter arrested. The two begin moving houses until one day, Maya kidnaps Chihiro and has him brutally assaulted. Haoran avenges him by stabbing Maya, but he becomes shaken up upon realizing his intent to kill him. Chihiro offers to run away with him, and they escape to Enoshima. At the end of their date, Haoran announces to Chihiro that he will turn himself into the police, and the two go their separate ways.

Years later, Chihiro has become a successful photographer, while Haoran becomes a construction worker after being released from prison. Maya dies by suicide in a train crossing accident. With encouragement from Kaji, Chihiro uploads his photography work to Instagram, to which Haoran finds one day. Realizing how much he misses him, Haoran attends Chihiro's photography exhibit, where he finds a photo of himself at the venue, and reunites with Chihiro.

== Characters ==
Chihiro Kashiwagi (柏木 千紘, Kashiwagi Chihiro)
Voiced by: Takuya Eguchi (audio drama), Portrayed by: Yurai Beppu (TV drama)
Chihiro is a gay man who was disowned by his family. Tanaka described Chihiro as looking "cool" and "tough" but also "lonely" and "gullible."
Keito (ケイト) / Haoran (浩然, Haoren)
Voiced by: Shinnosuke Tachibana, Kanon Fujimura (young) (audio drama), Portrayed by: Rei Sawamura (TV drama)
Keito is a mysterious and beautiful man who Chihiro meets at a bar. He later reveals that his real name is Haoran. When he used to work as a prostitute, he went under the name Hayato (ハヤト). Tanaka described Keito as "beautiful", "mysterious", and has a "strong sense of obsession." As Keito was the seme in the relationship, Tanaka stated that it was rare of her to draw a seme that was more androgynous than the uke.
Ryohei Kaji (加治亮平, Kaji Ryōhei)
Voiced by: Kenichirou Matsuda (audio drama), Portrayed by: Yuki Kubota (TV drama)
Kaji is an older brother figure for Chihiro and Haoran. Tanaka stated that while he was "quick to get angry", he was a "good guy at heart."
Maya (マヤ)
Voiced by: Hiroyuki Yoshino (audio drama), Portrayed by: Yosuke Asari (TV drama)
Maya is a man connected to Keito's past. He becomes acquainted with Keito through Kaji, who had helped Keito find work with him.
Shunichi Maeda (前田駿一, Maeda Shun'ichi)
Voiced by: Soma Saito (audio drama), Portrayed by: Kōya Matsudai (TV drama)
Shunichi is Chihiro's high school classmate and ex-boyfriend. Their relationship ended after Shunichi decided to marry a woman. When Shunichi asks to get back together with Chihiro, Chihiro realizes that Shunichi never loved him and rejects him.
Matsuki (マツキ)
Voiced by: Kentarō Itō (audio drama), Portrayed by: Sō Yamanaka (TV drama)
Matsuki is a former patron of Chihiro who had invited him to live with him as a "pet." He evicts Chihiro after he discovers that the latter had been engaging in sexual relations with other men. He is a long-time acquaintance of Keito and had been one of Keito's clients when Keito was still working as a prostitute.
Keito's mother
Voiced by: Seira Ryū (audio drama), Portrayed by: Miako Tadano (TV drama)
Keito's mother is a Chinese woman who works as a prostitute. Her drug addiction has affected her so much that she no longer recognizes Keito.
Chihiro's brother
Voiced by: Yūsuke Tonozaki (audio drama), Portrayed by: Shu Watanabe (TV drama)
Chihiro's older brother; like the rest of their family, he has disowned Chihiro.

== Media ==
=== Manga ===
Happy of the End was written and illustrated by Ogeretsu Tanaka. It was serialized in the monthly boys' love digital manga magazine Qpa from vol. 98 released on January 24, 2020, to vol. 141 released on August 24, 2023. The chapters were later released in three bound volumes by Takeshobo under the Bamboo Comics Qpa Collection imprint. Kuma publishes the series in English for North American distribution.

Happy of the End was Tanaka's first comic published with Takeshobo. In 2021, Tanaka stated through an interview with Chil Chil that she came up with the story when she was walking around in Shinjuku one morning and wanted to write a story featuring its scenery. Tanaka often walked around places in Shinjuku to get reference material for her illustrations, and for the cover illustrations, she walked around back alleys at night.

| No. | Original release date | Original ISBN | English release date | English ISBN |
|---|---|---|---|---|
| 1 | June 16, 2021 | 978-4801973404 | January 24, 2023 | 978-1634423410 |
| 2 | April 15, 2022 | 978-4801976160 | August 1, 2023 | 978-1634423915 |
| 3 | October 17, 2023 | 978-4801981843 | March 25, 2025 | 978-1634424899 |

=== Audio drama ===
An audio drama adaptation produced by Crown Works was released on CD. The first CD, adapting volume 1, was released on October 29, 2021. The second CD, adapting volume 2, was released on July 15, 2022.

Takuya Eguchi, who provides the voice to Chihiro, described Chihiro as "pure" while also expressing concern about his carelessness. He focused on portraying that part of him while recording. Shinnosuke Tachibana, who provides the voice to Keito, described him as "inhuman" at first, only regaining his humanity after meeting Chihiro. Tachibana also expressed interest in an anime adaptation being developed for the series. For the second drama CD, Eguchi, Tachibana, and Matsuda recorded their lines together apart from the rest of the cast members.

=== Television drama ===
A live-action television drama adaptation of Happy of the End was announced on August 5, 2024. The series was produced by NBCUniversal Entertainment Japan and premiered on September 3, 2024, (Note: Fuji TV lists the broadcast date as September 2, 2024, at 26:55, which is September 3, 2024, at 2:55 a.m.) on Fuji TV with a total of 8 episodes. Fuji TV On Demand, the channel's online streaming service, broadcasts two episodes with uncut content every week.

The series stars Yurai Beppu as Chihiro and One N' Only member Rei Sawamura as Keito/Haoran. The supporting cast includes Yuki Kubota as Kaji, Miako Tadano as Keito's mother, Yosuke Asari as Maya, and Sō Yamanaka as Matsuki. Additional cast members include Shu Watanabe as Chihiro's older brother.

The television drama adaptation was directed by Tomoyuki Furumaya (episodes 1–5, 7, and 8) and Takahiro Komura (episode 6). The screenplay was written by Furumaya and Miako Tadano. The soundtrack was composed by Kōji Endō. The opening theme was "2Colors" by The Spellbound featuring Jesse (Rize/The Bonez).

==== Episodes ====
| No. | Title | Directed by | Written by | Original release date |
|---|---|---|---|---|
| 1 | "Life is a Box of Chocolates"; Transliteration: "Jinsei wa Chokorēto no Hako" (Japanese: 人生はチョコレートの箱) | Tomoyuki Furumaya | Tomoyuki Furumaya, Miako Tadano | September 3, 2024 |
| 2 | "Haoran"; Transliteration: "Haoren" (Japanese: 浩然～ハオレン～) | Tomoyuki Furumaya | Tomoyuki Furumaya, Miako Tadano | September 3, 2024 (online streaming); September 10, 2024 (television broadcast) |
| 3 | "Contact from My Ex-Boyfriend"; Transliteration: "Motokare kara no Renraku" (Japanese: 元カレからの連絡) | Tomoyuki Furumaya | Tomoyuki Furumaya, Miako Tadano | September 10, 2024 (online streaming); September 17, 2024 (television broadcast) |
| 4 | "Memories from When I Was Happy"; Transliteration: "Shiawase Datta Kioku" (Japanese: 幸せだった記憶) | Tomoyuki Furumaya | Tomoyuki Furumaya, Miako Tadano | September 10, 2024 (online streaming); September 24, 2024 (television broadcast) |
| 5 | "You Can Blame Everything on Me"; Transliteration: "Zenbu, Ore no Sei de ii" (Japanese: ぜんぶ、俺のせいでいい) | Tomoyuki Furumaya | Tomoyuki Furumaya, Miako Tadano | September 17, 2024 (online streaming); October 1, 2024 (television broadcast) |
| 6 | "Things I'm Unable to Lose"; Transliteration: "Ushinaenai Mono" (Japanese: 失えないもの) | Takahiro Komura | Tomoyuki Furumaya, Miako Tadano | September 17, 2024 (online streaming); October 8, 2024 (television broadcast) |
| 7 | "Time to Settle This"; Transliteration: "Kecchaku o Tsukeru Toki" (Japanese: 決着をつける時) | Tomoyuki Furumaya | Tomoyuki Furumaya, Miako Tadano | September 24, 2024 (online streaming); October 15, 2024 (television broadcast) |
| 8 | "Happy of the End"; Transliteration: "Happī Obu Ji Endo" (Japanese: ハッピー・オブ・ジ・エンド) | Tomoyuki Furumaya | Tomoyuki Furumaya, Miako Tadano | September 24, 2024 (online streaming); October 22, 2024 (television broadcast) |

== Reception ==
As of August 2024, the series has sold a consecutive total of 310,000 physical copies. It won the Chil Chil BL Awards 2022 in the Deep category, and ranked no. 4 for Best Series in the Chil Chil BL Awards 2024.

== See also ==
- Oretachi Maji-kō Destroy, another manga series by the same creator under the pseudonym Marmelo Tanaka
- Yarichin Bitch Club, another manga series by the same creator
