= The Frontier Lord Begins with Zero Subjects =

Japanese light novel series

- First light novel volume cover

領民0人スタートの辺境領主様 (Ryōmin 0-nin Start no Henkyō Ryōshu-sama)
- Genre: Fantasy
- Novel series
- Written by: Fuurou
- Published by: Shōsetsuka ni Narō
- Original run: January 20, 2018 – present
- Light novel
- Written by: Fuurou
- Illustrated by: Kinta
- Published by: Earth Star Entertainment
- English publisher: NA: J-Novel Club
- Imprint: Earth Star Novel
- Original run: October 16, 2018 – present
- Volumes: 16
- Manga
- Written by: Fuurou
- Illustrated by: Yumbo
- Published by: Earth Star Entertainment
- English publisher: NA: J-Novel Club
- Imprint: Earth Star Comics
- Magazine: Comic Earth Star
- Original run: December 25, 2018 – present
- Volumes: 15
- Anime television series
- Directed by: Kenichi Imaizumi
- Written by: Kunihiko Okada
- Music by: Sakiko Sakuragi
- Studio: animation studio42
- Licensed by: Crunchyroll; SEA: Tropics Entertainment
- Original network: Tokyo MX, MBS, BS Asahi, AT-X
- Original run: July 10, 2026 – September 25, 2026
- Episodes: 12
- icon

The Frontier Lord Begins with Zero Subjects (Japanese: 領民0人スタートの辺境領主様, Hepburn: Ryōmin 0-nin Start no Henkyō Ryōshu-sama) is a Japanese light novel series written by Fuurou and illustrated by Kinta. It began serialization as a web novel published on the user-generated novel publishing website Shōsetsuka ni Narō in January 2018, before being acquired and published by Earth Star Entertainment under their Earth Star Novel imprint in October 2018. A manga adaptation illustrated by Yumbo began serialization on Earth Star Entertainment's Comic Earth Star manga website in December 2018. An anime television series adaptation produced by animation studio42 aired from July to September 2026.

== Plot ==
Despite being an orphan, Dias manages to distinguish himself in battle and is lauded as a hero. As a reward, the king granted him territory. However, upon arriving, he finds it to be remote, uninhabited, and lacking food. Dias then finds a girl named Alna, who has a blue horn on her forehead. Alna leads Dias to the village inhabited by her people. As lord, Dias decides to do his best to manage his territory.

== Characters ==
Dias (ディアス, Diasu)
Voiced by: Kenichirou Matsuda
Alna (アルナー, Arunā)
Voiced by: Shion Wakayama
Klaus (クラウス, Kurausu)
Voiced by: Taito Ban
Senai (セナイ)
Voiced by: Miku Itō
Aihan/Ayhan (アイハン)
Voiced by: Haruka Shiraishi
Eldan (エルダン, Erudan)
Voiced by: Jun Fukuyama
Francis (フランシス, Furanshisu)
Voiced by: Rikuya Yasuda
Francois (フランソワ, Furansowa)
Voiced by: Maria Abo
Mole (モール, Mōru)
Voiced by: Kujira
Diane (ディアーネ, Diāne)
Voiced by: Yoko Hikasa
Eima/Aymer Jerrybower (エイマ, Eima)
Voiced by: Nao Tōyama
Canise/Canis (カニス, Kanisu)
Voiced by: Minami Tsuda
Richard (リチャード, Richādo)
Voiced by: Takuma Terashima
Meiser (マイザー, Maizā)
Voiced by: Shōya Chiba
Zorg (ゾルグ, Zorugu)
Voiced by: Kentarō Kumagai

== Media ==
=== Light novel ===
Written by Fuurou, The Frontier Lord Begins with Zero Subjects began serialization as a web novel published on the user-generated novel publishing website Shōsetsuka ni Narō on January 20, 2018. It was later acquired and published by Earth Star Entertainment with illustrations by Kinta under their Earth Star Novel imprint on October 16, 2018. The series entered its final arc with the release of its sixteenth volume on September 16, 2026. The light novel is licensed in English by J-Novel Club.

No.	Title	Original release date	English release date
1	The Blue-Horned Maiden; Aoi Sumi no Otome (蒼角の乙女)	October 16, 2018; 978-4-8030-1238-5	December 4, 2023; 978-1-7183-3132-7
2	The Twins' Prayer; Futago no Inori (双子の祈り)	March 15, 2019; 978-4-8030-1280-4	March 4, 2024; 978-1-7183-3134-1
3	Family Bonds; Kazoku no Kizuna (家族の絆)	September 14, 2019; 978-4-8030-1338-2	May 13, 2024; 978-1-7183-3136-5
4	The Fruits of Bonds; Kizuna no Ketsujitsu (絆の結実)	April 15, 2020; 978-4-8030-1411-2	July 26, 2024; 978-1-7183-3138-9
5	Days of Winter White; Shirayuki no Hibi (白雪の日々)	December 16, 2020; 978-4-8030-1478-5	October 1, 2024; 978-1-7183-3140-2
6	Winter of the Azure Skies; Sōkyū no Kariudo (蒼穹の狩人)	July 15, 2021; 978-4-8030-1539-3	December 11, 2024; 978-1-7183-3142-6
7	A Fragrant Breeze at the Inn; Ryoshuku no Kafū (旅宿の香風)	January 15, 2022; 978-4-8030-1606-2	February 21, 2025; 978-1-7183-3144-0
8	The Nation's Heroic Saviors; Kyūkoku no Eiyū-tachi (救国の英雄達)	August 18, 2022; 978-4-8030-1685-7	May 2, 2025; 978-1-7183-3146-4
9	Pledge on a Spring Dawn; Shungyō no Sakazuki Koto (春暁の盃事)	April 14, 2023; 978-4-8030-1777-9	July 11, 2025; 978-1-7183-3148-8
10	Manners Maketh the Nobleman; Kijin no Fūgi (貴人の風儀)	September 15, 2023; 978-4-8030-1836-3	September 19, 2025; 978-1-7183-3150-1
11	Travelers from the Deep Blue Seas; Hekikai no Tabibito (碧海の旅人)	March 15, 2024; 978-4-8030-1923-0	November 24, 2025; 978-1-7183-3152-5
12	Miraculous Springs; Kiseki no Yūsui (奇蹟の湧水)	September 13, 2024; 978-4-8030-2008-3	February 6, 2026; 978-1-7183-3154-9
13	Tales of the Wise Mouse; Ken Nezumi no Bōken (賢鼠の冒険)	April 15, 2025; 978-4-8030-2113-4	April 14, 2026; 978-1-7183-3156-3
14	Keepers of the Flame; Jidai no Kishu (次代の旗手)	September 18, 2025; 978-4-8030-2183-7	June 22, 2026; 978-1-7183-3158-7
15	A Visit from the Old King 老王の来訪	April 15, 2026; 978-4-8030-2285-8	February 26, 2027; 978-1-7183-3160-0
16	聖地の真理	September 16, 2026; 978-4-8030-2372-5	—

=== Manga ===
A manga adaptation illustrated by Yumbo began serialization on Earth Star Entertainment's Comic Earth Star manga website on December 25, 2018. The manga adaptation is also licensed in English by J-Novel Club. During their panel at Anime Expo 2026, J-Novel Club announced that a print version of the manga would be released in January 2027.

No.	Original release date	Original ISBN	North American release date	North American ISBN
1	June 12, 2019	978-4-8030-1299-6	September 13, 2023	978-1-7183-8433-0
2	September 12, 2019	978-4-8030-1365-8	November 29, 2023	978-1-7183-8434-7
3	June 12, 2020	978-4-8030-1423-5	February 21, 2024	978-1-7183-8435-4
4	December 11, 2020	978-4-8030-1473-0	May 29, 2024	978-1-7183-8436-1
5	June 11, 2021	978-4-8030-1526-3	August 21, 2024	978-1-7183-8437-8
6	December 10, 2021	978-4-8030-1587-4	October 30, 2024	978-1-7183-8438-5
7	June 10, 2022	978-4-8030-1652-9	January 22, 2025	978-1-7183-8439-2
8	December 12, 2022	978-4-8030-1721-2	March 19, 2025	978-1-7183-8440-8
9	June 12, 2023	978-4-8030-1793-9	June 11, 2025	978-1-7183-8441-5
10	December 13, 2023	978-4-8030-1875-2	September 3, 2025	978-1-7183-8442-2
11	July 12, 2024	978-4-8030-1979-7	November 26, 2025	978-1-7183-8443-9
12	January 10, 2025	978-4-8030-2063-2	February 18, 2026	978-1-7183-8444-6
13	July 11, 2025	978-4-8030-2150-9	May 13, 2026	978-1-7183-8445-3
14	January 9, 2026	978-4-8030-2249-0	December 9, 2026	—
15	July 10, 2026	978-4-8030-2338-1	—	—

=== Anime ===
An anime television series adaptation was announced during the "Earth Star Novel 10th Anniversary Summer Festival" event on July 19, 2025. It is produced by animation studio42 and directed by Kenichi Imaizumi (AD), with Kunihiko Okada handling series composition and Keiichi Tsuboyama designing the characters. The series aired from July 10 to September 25, 2026, on Tokyo MX and other networks. The opening theme song is "Wonder", performed by Crown Head, while the ending theme song is "Hoshi Furu Yoru no Yakusoku" (星降る夜の約束; 'The Promise of the Night of Falling Stars'), performed by Kaya. Crunchyroll is streaming the series. Tropics Entertainment licensed the series in Southeast Asia.

==== Episodes ====
No.	Title	Directed by (Note: Production staff information is taken from the ending credits of each episode.)	Storyboarded by	Original release date (Note: Episodes are released on Prime Video and Crunchyroll a week before their televised airings.)
1	"The Frontier Lord and the Girl with the Blue Horn"; Transliteration: "Henkyō Ryōshu-sama to Aokaku no Otome" (Japanese: 辺境領主様と蒼角の乙女)	Kawamoto Kazutaka & Ayashichi Fuji	Kenichi Imaizumi (AD)	July 10, 2026
After 20 years army service, the King retires Dias, granting him Lordship of the remote, barren grasslands of Nezrose territory. Upon arrival, Dias meets the hostile Alna, a young woman whose horn glows blue when he speaks. He declares himself her ally, prompting her to lead him to Chief Moll of Onikin tribe. Moll reveals the Onikin are enemies of the King who stole the grasslands, so they hide their village with invisibility magic. Their horns can detect intent, glowing red for enemies and blue for friends. Deeming Dias an honourable idiot, Moll offers peaceful neighbourly relations, gifting him a tent, food, and two Baar (sheep), promising future trade if Dias raises a herd and hunts monsters. Dias slays forty Ghee (bison), impressing Alna. Moll explains that Dias's usefulness has proven his "manliness", making him an attractive potential husband. To Dias's embarrassment, Alna begins visiting to cook and offer village-building advice. Seeking trade supplies, Alna suggests a monster hunt. Though respecting his new "manliness", Dias faces resentment from Onikin men jealous of Alna's affection for him. During the hunt, Dias wields his magical self-repairing battleaxe he took from a Shogun. When an Earth Dragon attacks Alna, Dias crushes it, prompting Alna to declare she will marry him.
2	"The Frontier Lord and His First Visitor"; Transliteration: "Henkyō Ryōshu-sama to Hajimete no Raihōsha" (Japanese: 辺境領主様と初めての来訪者)	Motohiro Abe & Makoto Kikuchi	Kenichi Imaizumi	July 17, 2026
Moll reveals the dragon is too valuable to trade entirely. In exchange for a portion, the tribe construct him a well and a private toilet. Moll advises gifting the most valuable parts to Alna's parents, warning that as a dragon slayer, every unwed woman will pursue him if he does not marry Alna. Dias feels guilty learning Alna is only 15, 20 years his junior, and his unease deepens during their wedding. Due to their isolation, Dias worries about finding citizens for his future village. Alna discovers their Baar, Francoise, is pregnant. Because pregnant Baars can die from stress, they must move inside the tent. While this usually causes marital strife among the Onikin, Dias gladly obliges, impressing Alna. When travellers approach, the Onikin hide. The group includes Dias' former comrade Klaus and soldiers escorting Princess Diane, who offers marriage in exchange for conscripting his citizens for the new war. When Dias explains the King gave him nothing to build a village with, and that he has no citizens, Diane feels insulted and a soldier attacks. Dias disarms him and orders them away, prompting Diane to swear revenge. Alna reveals due to almost being married her horn now glows during threats against Dias as well. Klaus returns, having gotten fired to avoid the war, and asks to serve Dias instead. Alna agrees, noting his honesty made her horn glow blue.
3	"The Frontier Lord and the Strange Merchant"; Transliteration: "Henkyō Ryōshu-sama to Kimyōna Gyōshōjin" (Japanese: 辺境領主様と奇妙な行商人)	Tsuyoshi Inokuma	Kenichi Imaizumi	July 24, 2026
Klaus settles in as Captain of the Guard, outfitted in Earth Dragon armour. He suspects Diane's brother the greedy second prince confiscated Dias's village funding due to the royal succession dispute. Dias discovers twelve elderly women exiled from the Kasdeck tribe to starve, and welcomes them as his first citizens, naming the settlement Iluk Village; "First Village" in the ancient Onikin language. The women's leader, Grandma Maya, is relieved by Dias's anti-slavery stance, revealing that the current Kasdeck Lord hunts slaves for sport. Alna summons a trusted Frog-man merchant, Peijin-Do, to purchase the Earth Dragon materials. Peijin-Do explains he has two young elf twin slaves whose deceased parents paid him to protect them, but as the money has run out, he is seeking someone else to look after them. Dias takes in the twins, Senai and Ayhan. Alna reveals their names mean "Beautiful Moon" and "Holy Moon" in the ancient language, moving the girls to tears over memories of their parents. Ten days later, Kamalotz the aide to Eldan, the new Kasdeck Lord after defeating his father in a rebellion, arrives requesting a meeting. Dias reluctantly agrees, wary of Eldan's infamous harem of female slaves and the threat he poses to Iluk Village.
4	"The Frontier Lord and the Neighbouring Lord"; Transliteration: "Henkyō Ryōshu-sama to Otonari no Ryōshu" (Japanese: 辺境領主様とお隣の領主)	Kaitani Kotonari	Kenichi Imaizumi	July 31, 2026
Dias is surprised Eldan is a victorious rebellion leader, given his youth and obesity. Eldan eagerly seeks an alliance, expressing long-standing admiration for Dias. Upon learning of Dias's onikin wife and adopted elf daughters, Eldan reveals he is a half elephant-man whose mother was a demihuman slave. Shifting forms exhausts him, requiring constant care from his harem of loving wives. He explains that his father initiated a war upon discovering Eldan's underground movement to free demihuman slaves, which ended in Eldan's victory as the freed slaves vastly outnumbered his father's soldiers. Dias feels embarrassed to learn rumours have falsely famed him as a heroic slave liberator and enemy of the nobility. Still, he agrees to the alliance, and Eldan promises winter supplies to aid Dias's growing village. That night, mercenaries led by a noble with a personal grudge against Dias attack the grasslands. Dias and Alna effortlessly defeat them, though the noble escapes. Instead of executing the mercenaries, Dias disarms them to melt their weapons for valuable steel before exiling them. Touched by his mercy, Alna reflects on choosing not to kill Dias when they first met, impulsively kissing his cheek in an embarrassing burst of affection.
5	"The Frontier Lord and the Assailants from the Desert"; Transliteration: "Henkyō Ryōshu-sama to Sabaku Kara no Shūgekisha" (Japanese: 辺境領主様と砂漠からの襲撃者)	JOL-chan	Kenichi Imaizumi	August 7, 2026
Dias wants to grow crops, but Moll explains only grass survives on the Grasslands, suggesting he seek advice from the nature-sensitive forestkin. Dias decides to test an onikin method of growing herbs in potted soil mixed with bone and crushed verdant-leaf stone. Kamalotz returns with Eldan's promised supplies, including tools and livestock. Hidden in the wagon are several small mousekin, seeking to prove their bravery by defeating the Dragon Slayer. Dias easily defeats the stowaways, and Eldan apologizes for their actions, as mousekin are an argumentative species who did not believe Eldan's promise to free them and return them to their home in the desert. Alna, having grown up in poverty thanks to her older brother, is thrilled by the horses. As Dias cultivates fields with Klaus, an anxious Senai and Ayhan ask if keeping secrets is wrong; Dias reassures them that harmless secrets are fine. When Dias's medicinal herbs wither after a single day, he is left demoralized. Senai and Ayhan consider breaking a promise to their parents. They suddenly hear a cry for help from an intelligent mousekin trapped inside a box in the storage tent.
6	"The Frontier Lord and the Twins' Prayer"; Transliteration: "Henkyō Ryōshu-sama to Futago no Inori" (Japanese: 辺境領主様と双子の祈り)	Kawamoto Kazutaka & Ayashichi Fuji	Kawamoto Kazutaka & Ayashichi Fuji	August 14, 2026
The mousekin, Aymer Jerrybower, reveals she was boxed up as punishment by her peers for refusing to attack Dias. Recognizing her intelligence, Senai and Ayhan seek her help. They reveal they are forestkin carrying their late parents' knowledge seeds. When planted, these seeds become trees that act as gravestones and knowledge repositories. They can also help the girls generate barriers that boost plant life—though they swore to keep this power hidden from humans. Aymer suggests planting them secretly at night. In Kasdecks, rumors swirl about Dias, including claims that a monkeykin orchestrated the mousekin attack. The monkeykin is really the noble Dias defeated earlier, who holds a grudge against Dias for making him permanently impotent by kicking him in the groin for assaulting a woman. Diana marches 200 knights to the grasslands. Despite disliking mice, Alna accepts Aymer after sensing no malice. Dias is shocked when crops grow on his farm in a perfect circle instead of his neatly cultivated straight lines. A pigeonkin named Geraint brings a message from Eldan stating several dogkin wish to join the village. Dias agrees to welcome the dogkin and Aymer as citizens. That night, the dogkin arrive pursued by a Lich-anaconda. Caught off guard while asleep, Dias faces the monster with his bare hands.
7	"The Frontier Lord and the New Subjects"; Transliteration: "Henkyō Ryōshu-sama to Aratana Ryōmin-tachi" (Japanese: 辺境領主様と新たな領民たち)	Tsuyoshi Inokuma	Kōji Iwai	August 21, 2026
After Dias strangles the anaconda, Canis, a dogkin working for Eldan, introduces Dias' new subjects: the Tibe Masti clan and their leader Marf, the Bah Senji and leader Sedorio, and the Ausun Shep and leader Shev. Canis doubts the small dogkin can be soldiers, but Dias invites her to stay and see his plan. Klaus is smitten with Canis instantly and soon turns the Tibe Masti into effective warriors while the other clans excel at farming. Diane plunders the First King's tomb for a magic sceptre to attack Dias's village, misinformed by the impotent noble that Dias harbours a hidden fortune and lied about his war heroics. Her aide, Prinessia, abandons her to inform Prince Richard. Richard hesitates to act; he and the King deeply respect Dias, who transformed Richard from a spoiled prince into an honourable man and earned the nicknames "Dias the Kind" for protecting civilians during war, and "Ballbreaker Dias" for the way he punished a noble. Richard also reveals it was Meiser who stole Dias' village-building funds. Richard dispatches his subordinate Narius to retrieve Diane quietly and repay Dias. Diane uses a forged royal decree to demand troops from Eldan. Recognizing the fake, Eldan delays her and warns Dias, who shockingly replies that Eldan should let Diane attack. Before battle, Klaus and Canis confess to each other.
8	"The Frontier Lord and the Grassland Battle"; Transliteration: "Henkyō Ryōshu-sama to Sōgen no Tatakai" (Japanese: 辺境領主様と草原の戦い)	Kaitani Kotonari	Kenichi Imaizumi	August 28, 2026
Diane is furious Eldan's men refuse to fight until Eldan finishes his cup of tea, since noble etiquette states it is teatime. Meanwhile, Captain Gordon and his mercenaries also refuse to attack Dias, a widely respected figure who spared many mercenary lives during the war. Frustrated that the sceptre famed for "reducing 10,000 men to ashes" isn't working, Diane is shot off her horse by an invisible Alna, forcing her toward the Eastern Forest where Prince Richard's allies captures her. The messenger leaves behind Prince Richard's gold for Dias, though Alna distrusts him as her horn glows red and white in his presence. Eldan formally surrenders to Dias. Alna notes the sceptre was just empty of magic, so she refills it, causing a blast of dragon fire. The King confines Diane in the temple. Meiser frames one of his allies for his crimes, escaping punishment but losing the rest of his noble supporters. Richard is upset Eldan negotiates to pay no taxes for three years, then publicly supports Richard as the next king. This means Richard cannot oppose the tax break without seeming ungrateful to an ally, giving Eldan three years to become extremely rich. Narius is disappointed he could not retrieve the sceptre; unaware Dias now uses it to light cooking fires.
9	"The Frontier Lord and the Wedding"; Transliteration: "Henkyō Ryōshu-sama to Kekkon Shiki" (Japanese: 辺境領主様と結婚式)	Kawamoto Kazutaka & Ayashichi Fuji	Kawamoto Kazutaka & Ayashichi Fuji	September 4, 2026
Francis and Françoise strangely leave the village to speak with an unseen voice deep in the grasslands before returning. Later, Peijin-Do loses his business license, prompting his brother Peijin-Re to replace him. Peijin-Re explains that many Lostblood (Beastkin who lost their animal traits and appear human) wish to emigrate to his village as they face prejudice in their home countries. Using her lie-detection ability, Alna negotiates supplies, wine, and livestock for bargain prices. Dias decides to reward those who fought Diane with necklaces he makes himself from black ghee bone, the first of which Alna secretly takes for herself. For their upcoming wedding, Dias agrees to build Klaus and Canis a larger tent. When Klaus hunts black ghee alone for a betrothal gift, Canis scolds him for risking his life, turning the hunt into a group effort. Eager to avoid Alna's wrath, Dias consults Moll for wedding gift ideas. She suggests fine baar wool bedding, though Dias' naivety about why newlyweds need brand new bedsheets leads Moll to realize why Alna isn't pregnant yet. Canis's mother arrives, and Dias officiates the ceremony. He presents the bedding, causing embarrassing realization when guests tactfully leave the couple alone. Meanwhile, a group of youths approach the village, eager to reunite with their father.
10	"The Frontier Lord and His Son and Daughters"; Transliteration: "Henkyō Ryōshu-sama to Musuko to Musume-tachi" (Japanese: 辺境領主様と息子と娘たち)	Motohiro Abe	Motohiro Abe	September 11, 2026
Francoise nears the end of her pregnancy, with Francis showing unusual attentiveness for a male Baar. The youths arrive at the village, where Dias recognizes Aisa, Ely, and transwoman Ellie. Outraged at Dias not telling her he had children already, Alna calms down when Dias explains they are war orphans he helped raise. Aisa and Ely reveal they are now married. Dias' uncle Ben also arrives, revealing Dias' parents were Fundamentalist priests killed by Modernists who corrupted the Great Eastern Temple for their own greed. Ellie refuses to accept Alna as Dias' wife, but Alna responds with kindness, validating Ellie's female identity. Six visiting Baar stay, prompting a leadership contest where Francis and the new male compete via song. The females, including Francoise, select Francis. Dias comforts the defeated male, naming him Ethelbald. Aisa and Ely depart, while Ellie stays to find a husband. Disillusioned with the priesthood, Ben remains as a Baar herder. Ellie learns village men are called "Manly" for proving their usefulness, while Alna was insultingly called "Manly" after being forced into men's work by her deadbeat brother. Elsewhere, a male onikin rushes to the village to "save" Alna from Dias.
11	"The Frontier Lord and Alna's Big Brother"; Transliteration: "Henkyō Ryōshu-sama to Arunā no Ani" (Japanese: 辺境領主様とアルナーの兄)	Kaitani Kotonari	Kenichi Imaizumi	September 18, 2026
Dias hears a commotion and finds Alna beating her older brother, Zorg. Zorg is angry she married a human and reveals he stole their family's money for a deceitful lover, who used magic to manipulate his Soul Appraisal so she could successfully lie to him and steal the money. Dias kindly lets him stay the night. The next morning, Alna gifts Zorg a bow and arrows. When five Wind Dragons attack, Zorg is shocked to slay one with a single arrow as they are made from Earth Dragon material. During the fight, Dias is injured but cares more about the damage to the clothes Alna made him. Alna lets Zorg keep his share of the dragon materials but demands he return home to apologize to their family. That night, a mysterious talking baar sneaks in, leaving Dias a gift from her master for slaying dragons: Sanjivani leaves and a seed, warning him never to sell them. Meanwhile, Moll welcomes Zorg home, appointing him third in line for Chieftain due to his dragon-slaying feat, but warns she plans to thoroughly educate him on being a good leader. Elsewhere, Eldan plans to visit Dias, suffering from a disease only the Sanjivani plant can cure. Later, while relaxing after his injury, Dias collapses.
12	"The Frontier Lord and the Story That Began with Zero Subjects"; Transliteration: "Henkyō Ryōshu-sama to Ryōmin 0-ri kara Hajimatta Monogatari" (Japanese: 辺境領主様と領民0人から始まった物語)	Kawamoto Kazutaka & Ayashichi Fuji	Kenichi Imaizuni	September 25, 2026
Dias awakens with a fever as his wound festers. Senai and Ayhan locate his Sanjivani leaves, make medicine to cure him, and plant the seed in their private garden. By morning, Dias is nearly fully recovered, realizing Sanjivani is a medicinal herb. Eldan soon arrives on a royal mission but collapses from his genetic condition. Senai and Ayhan treat him with Sanjivani. Kamalotz grows suspicious, knowing Sanjivani is a legendary cure-all whose rumoured but unconfirmed existence could transform the world. The next morning, a fully recovered Eldan offers payment. Remembering the talking baar's warning against selling the herb, Dias refuses the money. Eldan then delivers an official apology from the king for Meiser's theft and Diane's attack, presenting three royal gifts: Dias is elevated to Duke, granted a three-year tax exemption, and given the right to choose a surname. The king hopes after his abdication Duke Dias will support Prince Richard. Ellie suggests using the returned funds to build a road connecting Kasdecks to the village. Alna, Senai, and Ayhan select the surname "Baarbadal" meaning "Hero Who Protects Baars", which also becomes the official name for the grasslands. Dias registers Alna, Senai, and Ayhan as his wife and daughters on the official documents.

== Reception ==
The series has over 1 million copies in circulation as of August 2022.

== See also ==
- Looks like a Job for a Maid! The Tales of a Dismissed Supermaid, a light novel series also illustrated by Kinta
- My Quiet Blacksmith Life in Another World, a light novel series also illustrated by Kinta
- Roll Over and Die, a light novel series also illustrated by Kinta
