= Yips =

Condition of sudden skill or control loss in an athlete

The yips are a psychoneuromuscular impediment, a sudden and unexplained loss of ability to execute certain skills in experienced performers such as athletes. Symptoms of the yips are losing fine motor skills and/or proprioception, or being affected by psychological issues such as performance anxiety that impact the muscle memory and decision-making, leaving them unable to perform basic skills.

The exact cause of the yips is still not fully understood. A yips episode may last a short time before the abilities return or it can require longer term adjustments to technique before recovery occurs. In some cases, a player at the highest level does not recover at all, forcing them to abandon the sport altogether. Causes include but may not be limited to performance anxiety and neurological conditions.

There have been a plethora of treatment options tested to ameliorate the yips, including clinical sport psychology therapy, motor imagery, pre-performance routines, medication, botulinum toxin, acupuncture, and emotional freedom techniques. However, their possible effectiveness is primarily based on personal experience rather than well-founded research evidence. Early intervention with a thorough treatment plan is imperative for recovery of athletes with yips.

== Etymology ==
While the term is used for characters in L. Frank Baum's The Lost Princess of Oz of 1917, yips is said to have been popularized in the 1920s by Tommy Armour—a Scottish-American professional golfer and later golf teacher—to explain the difficulties that led him to abandon tournament play.

== Brain activity and the yips ==
A 2021 study using electroencephalography (EEG) recordings found that athletes with the yips showed increased brain activity in the alpha band when initiating movements, especially when increasing force output to match a target. In this particular study, increased brain activity in the alpha and beta bands for the treatment group after the movement compared to the control group, suggested that heightened brain activity might indicate problems with inhibitory systems or increased focus on the body part involved in the task. Further research must be conducted with a larger sample size, more diverse populations, and more than two EEG electrodes in order to confirm these theories.

== In golf ==
In golf, the yips is a medically well-documented movement disorder known to interfere in particular with putting. In describing the yips, golfers have used terms such as twitches, staggers, jitters and jerks. The yips affects between a quarter and a half of all mature golfers. Researchers at the Mayo Clinic found that 33% to 48% of all serious golfers have experienced the yips. Golfers who have played for more than 25 years appear most prone to the condition.

Although the exact cause of the yips has yet to be determined, one possibility is biochemical changes in the brain that accompany aging. Excessive use of the involved muscles and intense demands of coordination and concentration may exacerbate the problem. Giving up golf for a month sometimes helps. Focal dystonia has been mentioned as another possibility for the cause of yips.

Professional golfers seriously afflicted by the yips include Ernie Els, David Duval, Pádraig Harrington, Bernhard Langer, Ben Hogan, Harry Vardon, Sam Snead, Ian Baker-Finch and Keegan Bradley, who missed a four-foot putt in the final round of the 2013 HP Byron Nelson Championship due to the condition (although he may also have been suffering from strabismus). At the 2015 Waste Management Open, golf analyst Nick Faldo suggested that Tiger Woods could be suffering from the yips. Jay Yarow from Business Insider commented after the 2014 Open that Woods had both the putting yips and the driver yips.

Interventions seeking to treat the affliction have been few and far between. Some golfers have tried changing their putter or their grip or even switching hands. However, these strategies have provided only temporary relief.

They are also known as "freezing", "the jerks", "the staggers", "the waggles", and "whisky fingers".

== In tennis ==
In tennis, the yips most often affects the (second) serve, leading to multiple double faults. Several top players have been affected by the yips in recent years, most notably Alexander Zverev in 2019, and Aryna Sabalenka in the beginning of 2022. For example, Zverev served a record of 20 double faults in his 2019 Cincinnati Masters first round loss against Miomir Kecmanović, while Sabalenka served up 39 double faults in her two first round losses in the 2022 Adelaide 1 and Adelaide 2 tournaments. From 2005 to 2008, Guillermo Coria, a former world number 3, suffered from service yips.

== In cricket ==
In cricket, the yips applies mostly to bowlers. The affliction seems to involve bowlers having trouble releasing the ball at the end of their action. An example of this was Keith Medlycott, who having reached the England squad was forced to abandon the sport. Another player, Gavin Hamilton, having played a Test as an all-rounder, largely abandoned his right-arm medium pace bowling, following the yips. He did not make another Test appearance, but has enjoyed a One Day International career for Scotland, predominantly as a specialist batsman. Collins Obuya was one of the stars of Kenya's 2003 World Cup—he gained a contract with Warwickshire on the back of it—but after injury he encountered difficulty with his bowling action, later going through a phase of appearing as a specialist batsman in international matches. Other players to have experienced similar problems include Ian Folley of Lancashire, and the West Indies test cricketer Roger Harper.

England cricket team sports psychologist Mark Bawden suffered from the yips himself as a teenager. He completed a PhD on the topic and has published a paper on the yips in the Journal of Sports Sciences.

== In baseball ==
In baseball, the yips usually manifests itself as a sudden inability to throw the baseball accurately. They are more apparent in pitchers and catchers, players who touch the ball the most in the game, though position players have also been subject to the malady.

Pittsburgh Pirates pitcher Steve Blass is an example; from 1964 to 1972, he was a dominant pitcher and All-Star; however, beginning in 1973, he suddenly lost his command, issuing 84 walks in 88 2/3 innings pitched. He retired in 1974 due to continued loss of his pitching ability.

"Steve Blass disease" has been attributed to talented players—such as New York Yankees second baseman Chuck Knoblauch or Los Angeles Dodgers second baseman Steve Sax—who suddenly lost their ability to throw the ball accurately to the first baseman. Sax's problems began in his 3rd season in the majors, but he continued to play in the league and seemingly recovered by 1989, going on to finish his career in 1994.

New York Mets catcher Mackey Sasser could not throw the ball back to the pitcher without tapping his mitt several times—San Francisco Giants outfielder Brett Butler once stole third base during a Sasser yip. Sasser's problem became worse after a 1990 collision at home plate with Jim Presley of the Atlanta Braves, leading to a decrease in Sasser's playing time, and his release from the Seattle Mariners in 1994.

Mark Wohlers of the Atlanta Braves was called "the 1990s poster child for Steve Blass Syndrome." He recovered enough to return to pitching, but not to previous levels.

Rick Ankiel is perhaps the most famous instance of this condition in baseball, having lost his control as a pitcher during the 2000 National League Division Series. After several years of deteriorating performance coupled with injuries, he subsequently returned in 2007 as a productive outfielder, becoming known for his throws from the outfield to gun down runners attempting to advance extra bases.

Jon Lester is also said to have suffered the yips on his pickoff attempts to first base. He did not throw to first at all in 2014, and struggled to make accurate throws early in 2015. For the rest of his career, when required to field a hit ball, Lester would run most of the way to 1st base and underhand throw the ball and on longer throws would spike it into the turf to reduce the chances of throwing it past the bag. His team also attempted to compensate for the problem with their catchers throwing 'back picks' to first base as well as the regulation throws to second.

Pittsburgh Pirates minor league pitching prospect Hayden Hurst was so badly affected by the yips that he left baseball and went to the University of South Carolina to play football instead. On April 26, 2018, he was drafted in the first round of the 2018 NFL draft, 25th overall, by the Baltimore Ravens as a tight end.

ESPN featured a story about Luke Hagerty's comeback from the yips in 2019. He never played after being drafted #32 overall by the Chicago Cubs in the 2002 draft.

== In gymnastics ==
In artistic gymnastics, a version of the yips affecting twisting form is known as the "twisties". It refers to a sudden loss of proprioception; a gymnast's ability to maintain body control during aerial manoeuvres. Some gymnasts express a feeling of disorientation, unaware of where the ground is. This loss of air awareness increases the chance of a serious or critical injury if the gymnast forgets in the moment how to land the maneuver safely.

During the 2020 Olympic qualifications, American gymnast Simone Biles flew out of bounds twice on the floor and failed to stick her landing on the vault. Despite this, she still qualified for the all-around final in first place. During the Olympic events, Biles was unable to complete her skills and popularized the term "twisties", causing her to withdraw from competition after the women's team all-around final. She attributed her loss of air awareness to a mental health condition. Biles returned to perform a downscaled routine in the balance beam final, winning the bronze medal. In 2024 she quipped that critics of her 2020 withdrawal had become "silent" after her return to win three gold medals in the 2024 Summer Olympics.

American gymnasts Laurie Hernandez and Aleah Finnegan both stated that they had experienced a loss of air awareness during their career and spoke out in support of Biles during the games in 2021. Finnegan stated "I cannot imagine the fear of having it happen to you during competition. You have absolutely no control over your body and what it does."

In trampoline gymnastics, the condition is typically referred to as "lost move syndrome". Olympic trampoline gymnast Bryony Page has discussed her personal experience with the condition while preparing to compete in the 2016 Olympics.

== In other areas ==
The yips also affects players in other sports. Examples include Markelle Fultz and Chuck Hayes's respective free throw shots in basketball. In darts, the yips are known as dartitis, with five-time world champion Eric Bristow an example of a sufferer.

In the National Football League (NFL), a normally reliable placekicker who starts struggling is also said to have the yips. Seven-time Pro Bowler Justin Tucker was described by fans and sportswriters as suffering from yips during his 2024 season, after a seemingly inexplicable series of misses leading to a career-low 73.9% field goal rate, despite finishing 12 seasons as among the most accurate kickers in the league. In 2024, Adam Breneman likened heavy favorite Ohio State’s unexpected loss to Michigan to the Buckeyes having the yips.

Stephen Hendry, seven times snooker World Champion, said after his loss to Mark Williams in the 2010 UK Championship that he had been suffering from the yips for ten years, and that the condition had affected his ability to cue through the ball, causing him great difficulty in regaining his old form.

== See also ==
- Analysis paralysis
- Choke
- Conversion disorder
- Dartitis
- "Lisa Gets the Blues"
- Stage fright
- Target panic
- "The Centipede's Dilemma"
