= Giorgio Conte =

Italian singer-songwriter and composer (born 1941)

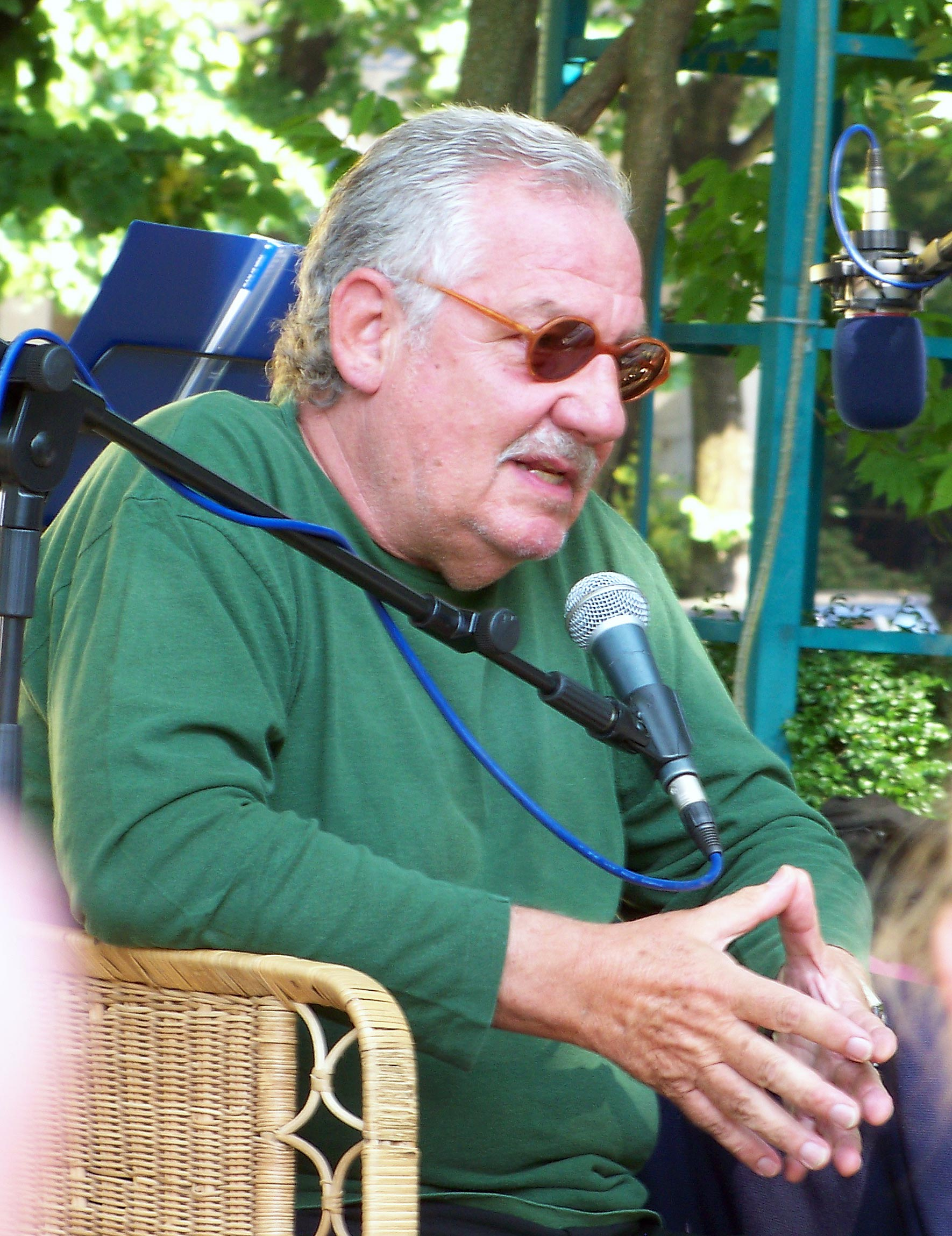
- Conte in 2009
- Born: 23 April 1941 (age 85); Asti, Italy
- Occupations: Composer singer-songwriter

Giorgio Conte (born 23 April 1941) is an Italian singer-songwriter, drummer, guitarist and composer.

== Life and career ==
Giorgio Conte was born in Asti, in the Piedmont region. His older brother is the singer, songwriter and pianist Paolo Conte. Giorgio Conte started his music career playing drums in a jazz combo with his brother. In the 1960s, he mostly concentrated on songwriting. His first song to be recorded was Carla Boni's "Piccola spiaggia", with lyrics by Giorgio Calabrese. In 1983, after receiving encouragement from Ariston Records artistic director Alfredo Rossi, he made his debut as a recording artist with the album Zona Cesarini, whose title alludes to his late arrival into the scene. The same year, following a successful performance at Club Tenco, he left his day job at a law firm to fully dedicate himself to music.

Conte has written numerous domestic hits for other artists, including Patty Pravo's "Tripoli 69", Equipe 84's "Una giornata al mare", Rosanna Fratello's "Non sono Maddalena", Ornella Vanoni's "Che barba amore mio", and Fausto Leali's "Deborah". His collaborations also include Francesco Baccini (of whom he produced his first two albums), Mina, Loretta Goggi, Rossana Casale, Gipo Farassino. In 2022, he was awarded the Premio Tenco for his career.

== Discography ==
Studio albums

- 1983 - Zona Cesarini
- 1987 - L'erba di S. Pietro
- 1993 - Giorgio Conte
- 1997 - La vita fosse
- 1999 - Eccomi qua...
- 2000 - L'ambasciatore dei sogni
- 2003 - Il contestorie
- 2011 - C.Q.F.P.
- 2014 - Cascina Piovanotto
- 2017 - Sconfinando

Live albums

- 1995 - Concerto Live
- 2004 - The Best of / Live al Sovrano Festival / Alberobello 2004

Collections

- 2004 - La belle vie...
