= Magical Sempai =

Japanese manga and anime series

- First tankōbon volume cover, featuring Sempai

手品先輩 (Tejina Senpai)
- Genre: Comedy
- Manga
- Written by: Azu
- Published by: Kodansha
- English publisher: NA: Kodansha USA (digital)
- Magazine: Weekly Young Magazine
- Original run: February 29, 2016 – February 15, 2021
- Volumes: 8
- Anime television series
- Directed by: Fumiaki Usui
- Written by: Rintarou Ikeda
- Music by: Takeshi Hama
- Studio: Liden Films
- Licensed by: NA: Crunchyroll; SA/SEA: Medialink
- Original network: Tokyo MX, MBS, BS-NTV
- Original run: July 2, 2019 – September 17, 2019
- Episodes: 12
- Manga

Isekai Senpai: Tejina Senpai wa Kono Sekai de mo Ponkotsu na Yō Desu
- Written by: Shotan
- Published by: Ichijinsha
- Magazine: Manga 4-Koma Palette
- Original run: November 22, 2019 – present
- icon

Magical Sempai (Japanese: 手品先輩, Hepburn: Tejina Senpai; "Magic Trick Senior") is a Japanese manga series by Azu. It was serialized in Kodansha's seinen manga magazine Weekly Young Magazine from February 2016 to February 2021 and has been collected into eight tankōbon volumes. Kodansha USA published the series digitally in North America. An anime television series adaptation by Liden Films aired from July to September 2019.

== Plot ==
An unmotivated first-year high school boy finds a girl practicing a magic trick. The girl is Sempai, the only remaining member of the Magic Club. She has stage fright whenever she performs in front of an audience, which often results in her screwing up. She recruits the boy to be her assistant, despite his objections.

== Characters ==
Sempai (先輩, Senpai)
Voiced by: Kaede Hondo (Japanese); Lizzie Freeman (English)
A high school girl who is a skilled magician when no one is watching. However, due to embarrassment and clumsiness, she easily gets stage fright and often blunders her magic tricks when even one person watches her perform.^{Ch. 1} One of her weaknesses is that she is easy to hypnotize.^{Ch. 20-21}
Assistant (助手, Joshu)
Voiced by: Aoi Ichikawa (Japanese); Landon MacDonald (English)
A high school boy who gets recruited to be Sempai's assistant in the Magic Club, despite his objections.^{Ch. 1-9} It has been shown he can do magic tricks better than Sempai.^{Ch. 2, 11, 17} He has short hair in a bowl cut.^{Ch. 1} He also joins the school's Chemistry Club.^{Ch. 31}
Sister (お姉ちゃん, Onee-chan)
Voiced by: Himika Akaneya (Japanese); Cristina Vee (English)
Sempai's older sister, who is a teacher at the school. She agrees to be the Magic Club advisor.^{Ch. 9} She is a bit air-headed as well, and enjoys dressing Sempai in cosplay costumes.^{Ch. 14-15} It is later revealed that she is married.^{Ch. 50-51}
Saki (咲ちゃん, Saki-chan)
Voiced by: Eri Kitamura
Saki is a third-year transfer student with long wavy hair. She is in charge of the Street Performance Club and intends to take over the Magic Club. She is obsessed with her younger brother, Masashi. She can make balloon animals, but her performances are as clumsy and ditzy as Sempai's.^{Ch. 33-35} After losing to Sempai in comparing breast sizes, she and Masashi join the Magic Club.^{Ch. 35} She and Sempai are not good students academically.^{Ch. 43}
Masashi (まさし)
Voiced by: Daisuke Namikawa
Masashi is Saki's obese younger brother. He is level-headed like Assistant. He and Saki join the Magic Club.^{Ch. 33-35} Saki affectionately refers to him as "Ma-kun" (まーくん).^{Ch. 33}
Madara (斑さん, Madara-san)
Voiced by: Rie Takahashi
Madara is a second-year student and president of the Chemistry Club. She let Assistant join her club when the Magic Club did not have enough members. She has long dark hair and wears glasses.^{Ch. 31} She is able to do some tricks by using science techniques but is annoyed by Sempai's antics.^{Ch. 53}

== Media ==
=== Manga ===
Written and illustrated by Azu, Magical Sempai was serialized in Kodansha's Weekly Young Magazine from February 29, 2016, to February 15, 2021. Kodansha collected its chapters in eight individual tankōbon volumes, which were released from August 5, 2016, to March 5, 2021.

Kodansha USA published the series digitally in North America from September 12, 2017, to August 31, 2021.

A spinoff manga series titled Isekai Senpai: Tejina Senpai wa Kono Sekai de mo Ponkotsu na Yō Desu (異世界先輩 -手品先輩はこの世界でもポンコツなようです-) by Shotan was launched in Ichijinsha's Manga 4-Koma Palette on November 22, 2019.

==== Volumes ====
No.	Original release date	Original ISBN	English release date	English ISBN
1	August 5, 2016	978-4-06-382835-1	September 12, 2017	978-1-68-233907-7
Covers chapters in Young Magazine issues 2016 Nos. 13-25 and 27: Chapters 1–15
2	December 6, 2016	978-4-06-382888-7	October 10, 2017	978-1-68-233908-4
Covers chapters in Young Magazine issues from 2016 No. 26, 28-39, 42-45: Chapters 16–31
3	April 6, 2017	978-4-06-382955-6	November 14, 2017	978-1-68-233909-1
This covers chapters in Young Magazine issues 2016 No. 40, 41, 46-50, 52, 2017 No. 1-9, 11, and Weekly Shōnen Magazine issues 2016 No. 41: Chapters 32–46; "Weekly Mag Trip" (週マガ出張編, Shū Magajin Shutchō-hen); Chapter 46.5
4	September 6, 2017	978-4-06-510144-5	February 6, 2018	978-1-64-212120-9
This covers chapters in Young Magazine issues 2017 No. 12, 13, 15-19, 22, 24-29, 31, 32: Chapters 47–62
5	November 6, 2018	978-4-06-513559-4	February 5, 2019	978-1-64-212668-6
This covers chapters in Young Magazine issues 2017 No. 33, 34, 36/37, 39, 41, 43, 45, 49, and 2018 No. 38-44: Chapters 63–78
6	September 6, 2019	978-4-06-516993-3	January 7, 2020	978-1-64-659199-2
This covers chapters in Young Magazine issues 2015 No. 9, 10; 2018 No. 2/3, 6, 10, 12, 14, 16, 20, 27, 29, 31, 33, 35, 38: Chapters 79–94; "One-Shot Version Part 1" (読み切り版 その①, Yomikiri-ban Sono 1); "One-Shot Version Part 2" (読み切り版 その②, Yomikiri-ban Sono 2)
7	July 6, 2020	978-4-06-520194-7	November 3, 2020	978-1-64-659795-6
This covers chapters in Young Magazine issues 2014 No. 45; 2019 No. 40, 42, 44, 50, 52; 2020 No. 2/3, 6, 8, 10, 12, 14, 16, 18, 20, 22/23,27; and Monthly Young Magazine 2014 No. 10: Chapters 95–110; "The Talking Dog" (しゃべるいぬ, Shaberu Inu); "The Talking Dog" / "The Walk" (しゃべるいぬ 散步編, Shaberu Inu Sanpo Hen)
8	March 5, 2021	978-4-06-522586-8	August 31, 2021	978-1-63-699316-4
This covers chapters in Young Magazine issues 2020 No. 25, 29 31, 33, 35, 38, 40, 42, 44, 46, 48, 49, 52; 2021 No. 2/3, 6, 8, 10, 12: Chapters 111–128; "Non-Magical Sempai" (手品しない先輩, Tejina Shinai Senpai)

=== Anime ===
An anime television series adaptation was announced in the 49th issue of Weekly Young Magazine on November 5, 2018. The series was produced by Liden Films and directed by Fumiaki Usui. Rintarou Ikeda handled the series composition, Eriko Itō designed the characters, and Takeshi Hama composed the music.

It aired from July 2 to September 17, 2019, on Tokyo MX, MBS, and BS-NTV. The series consists of 12 fifteen-minute episodes. i☆Ris performed the opening theme "FANTASTIC ILLUSION", while Minori Suzuki performed the ending theme "Dame wa Dame" (ダメハダメ). Crunchyroll streamed the series.

On November 16, 2019, Crunchyroll announced that the series would receive an English dub.

==== Episodes ====
No.	Title (Note: All English titles are taken from Crunchyroll.)	Original release date
1	"The Unknown Sempai"; Transliteration: "Michi no Senpai" (Japanese: 未知の先輩)	July 2, 2019
1	"Sempai in a Box"; Transliteration: "Hakoiri Senpai" (Japanese: 箱入り先輩)	July 2, 2019
1	"Sempai Calls"; Transliteration: "Yobidasu Senpai" (Japanese: 呼び出す先輩)	July 2, 2019
1	"Sempai and the Pigeon"; Transliteration: "Hato to Senpai" (Japanese: ハトと先輩)	July 2, 2019
A first-year high school boy is forced to pick a school club to join when he stumbles upon his Sempai practicing a magic trick. However, upon finding herself with an audience, she gets stage fright and can't complete any of her magic tricks successfully. The same boy later finds himself drafted as the Assistant while Sempai tries to recruit new club members, but Sempai struggles to break out of her wooden box. The Assistant is called to the club room where Sempai has baked him some bread, but he immediately suspects her of testing a new trick. Sempai tries to show off her new white pigeon, but can't control it.
2	"Sempai Bends"; Transliteration: "Mageru Senpai" (Japanese: 曲げる先輩)	July 9, 2019
2	"Impenetrable Sempai"; Transliteration: "Hikantsū Senpai" (Japanese: 非貫通先輩)	July 9, 2019
2	"Sempai Shifts Responsibility"; Transliteration: "Sekinintenka Senpai" (Japanese: 責任転嫁先輩)	July 9, 2019
2	"The Lady Who Stinks at Magic"; Transliteration: "Hetakuso Tejina Obāsan" (Japanese: ヘタクソ手品おばさん)	July 9, 2019
2	"Sempai Gets Serious"; Transliteration: "Honki Senpai" (Japanese: 本気先輩)	July 9, 2019
The Assistant does a spoon-bending trick that Sempai fails at, despite explaining it to him. Sempai attempts a coin penetration trick, but keeps losing the coin in difficult spots. Sempai shows off "Behemoth-kun", a stuffed toy weasel. Sempai utterly fails at magic tricks in front of some kids in the park. Sempai locks her Assistant in the club room when she discovers he hasn't officially signed up for the Magic Club yet.
3	"Sempai Says No"; Transliteration: "Iyagaru Senpai" (Japanese: いやがる先輩)	July 16, 2019
3	"Sempai's Quick Draw"; Transliteration: "Nukiuchi Senpai" (Japanese: 抜き打ち先輩)	July 16, 2019
3	"Conquering Sempai"; Transliteration: "Kokufuku Senpai" (Japanese: 克服先輩)	July 16, 2019
3	"Kimono Sempai"; Transliteration: "Wasō Senpai" (Japanese: 和装先輩)	July 16, 2019
3	"Sempai Off Campus"; Transliteration: "Kōgai Senpai" (Japanese: 校外先輩)	July 16, 2019
Sempai hands in her Assistant's club form to his homeroom teacher, who happens to be Sempai's older sister. Sempai tests her Assistant's skill to try to act superior over him. Sempai tries to conquer her stage fright. Sempai puts on a kimono to do traditional Japanese magic. Sempai attempts to perform magic with wild pigeons in the park.
4	"Celebrating Sempai"; Transliteration: "Iwau Senpai" (Japanese: 祝う先輩)	July 23, 2019
4	"Scouting Sempai"; Transliteration: "Sukauto Senpai" (Japanese: スカウト先輩)	July 23, 2019
4	"Pigeon, Pigeon and Sempai"; Transliteration: "Hato to Hato to Senpai" (Japanese: ハトとハトと先輩)	July 23, 2019
4	"Sempai Finishes the Job"; Transliteration: "Shitomeru Senpai" (Japanese: 仕留める先輩)	July 23, 2019
4	"Magic Club Sempai"; Transliteration: "Kijutsubu Senpai" (Japanese: 奇術部先輩)	July 23, 2019
Sempai tries to celebrate her Assistant's one-month anniversary since joining the club when her Sister informs her that the Magic Club is not official because it doesn't have enough members. Assistant tries to join another club but can't escape his Sempai. Sempai introduces two new white pigeons. Sempai tries to do a sword box trick. Sempai is able to successfully perform magic by herself until her Assistant comes in and announces he's joined the Chemistry Club.
5	"Observer and Sempai"; Transliteration: "Kengaku-sha to Senpai" (Japanese: 見学者と先輩)	July 30, 2019
5	"Onion Sempai"; Transliteration: "Tamanegi Senpai" (Japanese: タマネギ先輩)	July 30, 2019
5	"Chemistry Sempai"; Transliteration: "Kagaku Senpai" (Japanese: 化学先輩)	July 30, 2019
5	"Unexpected Sempai"; Transliteration: "Sōteigai Senpai" (Japanese: 想定外先輩)	July 30, 2019
5	"Inviting Sempai"; Transliteration: "Maneku Senpai" (Japanese: 招く先輩)	July 30, 2019
Assistant dreads the potential arrival of a couple girls who want to observe the Magic Club. Sempai tests out a new quick-change trick as her Sister puts her in increasingly skimpy outfits. Madara uses her science knowledge to show off tricks to the Assistant. Sempai tries to surprise Assistant from inside a box, but overhears some embarrassing information from him instead. Sempai invites Assistant into her home.
6	"Unknowing Sempai"; Transliteration: "Shiranai Senpai" (Japanese: 知らない先輩)	August 6, 2019
6	"Gal-Pan Sempai"; Transliteration: "Gyaru Pan Senpai" (Japanese: ギャルパン先輩)	August 6, 2019
6	"Measuring Sempai"; Transliteration: "Hakaru Senpai" (Japanese: はかる先輩)	August 6, 2019
6	"Suspicious Sempai"; Transliteration: "Usankusai Senpai" (Japanese: 胡散臭い先輩)	August 6, 2019
Saki, a senior student, announces her intent to take over the Magic Club with her "street performance" tricks. Saki introduces her brother, Ma-kun, to the club, though he is less enthused about joining. Sempai tries to show off her own magic tricks in response and fails, when her Sister announces she's decided to become the Magic Club's advisor. Sempai tries to practice hypnotism on her Assistant, but he turns the lesson back on her.
7	"Creative Sempai"; Transliteration: "Tsukuru Senpai" (Japanese: 作る先輩)	August 13, 2019
7	"Fund-Raising Sempai"; Transliteration: "Kanpa Senpai" (Japanese: カンパ先輩)	August 13, 2019
7	"Pool Sempai"; Transliteration: "Pūru Senpai" (Japanese: プール先輩)	August 13, 2019
7	"Overcoming Sempai"; Transliteration: "Norikoeru Senpai" (Japanese: 乗り越える先輩)	August 13, 2019
Saki and Sempai each try to bake cookies for Ma-kun and Assistant, respectively. The Magic Club tries to raise funds in a nearby park. Sempai wants to demonstrate an underwater magic trick, but her Assistant fears she'll drown. Assistant tries to help Sempai overcome her stage fright again.
8	"Chinese Sempai"; Transliteration: "Chūka Senpai" (Japanese: 中華先輩)	August 20, 2019
8	"Mentalist Sempai"; Transliteration: "Mentarisuto Senpai" (Japanese: メンタリスト先輩)	August 20, 2019
8	"Mikan Sempai"; Transliteration: "Mikan Senpai" (Japanese: ミカン先輩)	August 20, 2019
8	"Internet Sempai"; Transliteration: "Netto Senpai" (Japanese: ネット先輩)	August 20, 2019
8	"Delivery Sempai"; Transliteration: "Deribarī Senpai" (Japanese: デリバリー先輩)	August 20, 2019
Sempai attempts to uncover the secrets of Bian Lian with the Magic Club. Sempai practices mentalism with her Assistant. Sempai has too many mikan. Sempai makes a webpage for the Magic Club. The Magic Club is invited to a local nursery school.
9	"Biased Sempai"; Transliteration: "Henken Senpai" (Japanese: 偏見先輩)	August 27, 2019
9	"Make-Up Exam Sempai"; Transliteration: "Tsuishi Senpai" (Japanese: 追試先輩)	August 27, 2019
9	"Ice Cream Sempai"; Transliteration: "Aisu Senpai" (Japanese: アイス先輩)	August 27, 2019
9	"Swimsuit Sempai"; Transliteration: "Mizugi Senpai" (Japanese: 水着先輩)	August 27, 2019
Sempai attempts a mind-reading trick. Sempai and Saki play a counting game while waiting to take a make-up exam. The Magic Club get together during summer break. The Magic Club goes shopping for swimsuits.
10	"Beach Sempai"; Transliteration: "Umi to Senpai" (Japanese: 海と先輩)	September 3, 2019
10	"Crab Sempai"; Transliteration: "Kani Senpai" (Japanese: カニ先輩)	September 3, 2019
10	"Watermelon Sempai"; Transliteration: "Suika Senpai" (Japanese: スイカ先輩)	September 3, 2019
10	"Fireworks Sempai"; Transliteration: "Hanabi Senpai" (Japanese: 花火先輩)	September 3, 2019
The Magic Club hits the beach in their new swimsuits. Assistant runs into Madara on the same beach. Assistant invites Madara to the Magic Club's watermelon splitting game. Sempai tries to demonstrate some fire magic tricks, setting off Saki's fireworks prematurely.
11	"Four Balls Sempai"; Transliteration: "Yottsu-Dama Senpai" (Japanese: 四つ玉先輩)	September 10, 2019
11	"Ventriloquism Sempai"; Transliteration: "Fukuwajutsu Senpai" (Japanese: 腹話術先輩)	September 10, 2019
11	"Tailing Sempai"; Transliteration: "Bikō Senpai" (Japanese: 尾行先輩)	September 10, 2019
Sempai practices magic tricks with four balls. Saki practices ventriloquism with a hand puppet of her brother. The rest of the Magic Club tail Sempai after school to find out if she has a boyfriend.
12	"Growing Sempai"; Transliteration: "Hayasu Senpai" (Japanese: はやす先輩)	September 17, 2019
12	"Unfailing Sempai"; Transliteration: "Shippai shinai Senpai" (Japanese: 失敗しない先輩)	September 17, 2019
12	"Persistent Sempai"; Transliteration: "Makenai Senpai" (Japanese: 負けない先輩)	September 17, 2019
12	"Silent Sempai"; Transliteration: "Sairento Senpai" (Japanese: サイレント先輩)	September 17, 2019
12	"Bunny Sempai"; Transliteration: "Banī Senpai" (Japanese: バニー先輩)	September 17, 2019
Saki teaches the club how to make balloon shapes. Sempai tries to prove her skills to her Assistant again. Madara shows off more tricks with her science knowledge. Sempai tries to practice magic while Assistant sleeps in the club room. Sempai tries to beat her stage fright by dressing in a sexy bunny costume.
