= Aoi Ichikawa =

Japanese voice actor (born 1991)

- 市川 蒼
- Born: October 2, 1991 (age 34); Fukuoka Prefecture, Japan
- Occupation: Voice actor
- Years active: 2016–present
- Agent: Office Osawa

Aoi Ichikawa (市川 蒼, Ichikawa Aoi; born October 2, 1991) is a Japanese voice actor affiliated with Office Osawa. Some of his notable roles include Eita Izumi in Just Because!, Mitsuru in Darling in the Franxx, Seiya Takehaya in Tsurune, Assistant in Magical Sempai, Nagara in Sonny Boy, and Rudo Surebrec in Gachiakuta.

== Biography ==
Ichikawa was born in Fukuoka Prefecture on October 2, 1991. In 2017, he starred in his first lead role as Eita Izumi in the anime series Just Because!. In 2022, he received the Best New Actor Award at the 16th Seiyu Awards.

== Filmography ==
=== Television animation ===
| Year | Title | Role | Ref. |
|---|---|---|---|
| 2017 | Just Because! | Eita Izumi | |
| 2018 | Darling in the Franxx | Mitsuru | |
| 2018 | Tsurune | Seiya Takehaya | |
| 2019 | Boogiepop and Others | Shiro Tanaka | |
| 2019 | Bakugan: Battle Planet | Hydorous | |
| 2019 | Magical Sempai | Assistant | |
| 2020 | Number24 | Yayoi Tsuzura | |
| 2020 | Plunderer | Pele | |
| 2020 | Fruits Basket 2nd Season | Naohito Sakuragi | |
| 2020 | Wandering Witch: The Journey of Elaina | Emil | |
| 2021 | Horimiya | Ichiro Watabe | |
| 2021 | The Saint's Magic Power Is Omnipotent | Rayne Salutania | |
| 2021 | Sonny Boy | Nagara | |
| 2022 | Blue Lock | Gurimu Igarashi | |
| 2022 | Spy × Family | Demetrius Desmond | |
| 2023 | Tsurune: The Linking Shot | Seiya Takehaya | |
| 2023 | Hell's Paradise: Jigokuraku | Yamada Asaemon Fuchi | |
| 2023 | Dead Mount Death Play | Shizuki Shinoyama | |
| 2023 | Horimiya: The Missing Pieces | Ichiro Watabe | |
| 2024 | Twilight Out of Focus | Runa Kagari | |
| 2025 | Mashin Creator Wataru | Sho | |
| 2025 | Witch Watch | Takashi Isshiki | |
| 2025 | Gachiakuta | Rudo Surebrec | |
| 2025 | My Hero Academia: Final Season | Kota Izumi (teen) | |
| 2026 | Mebius Dust | Kai | |

=== Original net animation ===
| Year | Title | Role | Ref. |
|---|---|---|---|
| 2020 | Bakugan: Armored Alliance | Hydorous | |
| 2025 | Disney Twisted-Wonderland: The Animation | Ruggie Bucchi | |

=== Original video animation ===
| Year | Title | Role | Ref. |
|---|---|---|---|
| 2018 | Hori-san to Miyamura-kun | Schoolboy A | |
| 2021 | The Ancient Magus' Bride: The Boy From the West and the Knight of the Mountain Haze | Mysterious Boy/Evan | |

=== Anime films ===
| Year | Title | Role | Ref. |
|---|---|---|---|
| 2022 | Tsurune: The Movie – The First Shot | Seiya Takehaya | |
| 2024 | Blue Lock: Episode Nagi | Gurimu Igarashi | |

=== Video games ===
| Year | Title | Role | Ref. |
|---|---|---|---|
| 2019 | Namu Amida Butsu! Rendai Utena | Rasetsuten, Kongōbu Bosatsu | |
| 2019 | Ikemen Genjiden: Ayakashi Koi Enishi | Taira no Shigehira | |
| 2020 | White Cat Project | Sieg | |
| 2020 | Disney Twisted-Wonderland | Ruggie Bucchi | |
| 2021 | The Caligula Effect 2 | Gin Noto | |
| 2021 | Dragon Quest X | Doltam | |
| 2023 | Cookie Run: Kingdom | Stardust Cookie | |
| 2024 | Eiyuden Chronicle: Hundred Heroes | Leon | |

=== Dubbing ===
- Talk to Me (Riley (Joe Bird))
