= Tsurune: The Movie – The First Shot =

2022 Japanese animated film by Takuya Yamamura

- Theatrical release poster
- Kanji: 劇場版 ツルネ －はじまりの一射－
- Revised Hepburn: Gekijōban Tsurune: Hajimari no Issha
- Directed by: Takuya Yamamura
- Screenplay by: Takuya Yamamura (Note: Script is supervised by Michiko Yokote.)
- Based on: Tsurune by Kotoko Ayano
- Produced by: Sakiko Yamamoto; Shinichi Nakamura; Megumi Suzuki; Shigeru Saitō
- Starring: Yūto Uemura; Shintarō Asanuma; Aoi Ichikawa; Ryōta Suzuki; Shogo Yano; Kaito Ishikawa; Kensho Ono
- Cinematography: Kōhei Funamoto
- Edited by: Kengo Shigemura
- Music by: Masaru Yokoyama
- Backgrounds by: Shōko Ochiai
- Production company: Kyoto Animation
- Distributed by: Shochiku
- Release date: August 19, 2022
- Running time: 102 minutes
- Country: Japan
- Language: Japanese
- Box office: ¥125 million (US$953,030)

Tsurune: The Movie – The First Shot (Japanese: 劇場版 ツルネ －はじまりの一射－, Hepburn: Gekijōban Tsurune: Hajimari no Issha) is a 2022 Japanese animated compilation film of the anime television series Tsurune (2018–2019), which itself is based on the light novel series of the same name by Kotoko Ayano. Produced by Kyoto Animation and distributed by Shochiku, the film is written and directed by Takuya Yamamura. The film follows Minato Narumiya, who has developed target panic from kyūdō in middle school, once again joining the kyūdo club of Kazemai High School.

The film was first announced in October 2020, with Yamamura attached to helm the project. In March 2022, the cast and staff of the film were revealed. Additional cast joined in April 2022.

Tsurune: The Movie – The First Shot premiered in Japan on August 19, 2022. The film grossed ¥125 million at the box office.

== Plot ==
A young Minato Narumiya is brought by his mother who used to play kyūdō in the past to a kyūdō hall, where he witnesses Masaki Takigawa's grandfather Akihiro Yasaka's kyūdō and hears the sound of the bowstring hitting the bow after the arrow was released. Minato's mother explains to him about that sound called "tsurune". Since then, Minato desires to learn kyūdō.

At present, Minato is part of Kazemai High School's kyūdō club along with his childhood friends Seiya Takehaya and Ryōhei Yamanouchi, Nanao Kisaragi, and Kaito Onogi for the male team. They are preparing for the prefectural tournament after qualifying from the preliminary match, while Minato is recovering from target panic that has developed from his kyūdō in middle school. Since the prelims when he was told by his and Minato's former teammate Shū Fujiwara to stop being fixated on Minato, Seiya is acting strange during practice, to the point of having a fallout with Masaki who is coaching the club. He is then missing practice after getting sick. While the members of the kyūdō club of Kazemai and Kirisaki High School, where Shū is enrolled, are visiting a Shinto shrine, Minato learns from Shū about what the latter had told Seiya. As he heads home, Minato encounters Seiya feeling weak from his sickness at a bridge. The two reaffirm their friendship after Minato told Seiya that he has decided to practice kyūdō with him.

At school, Minato overhears Masaki about taking "revenge" against his late grandfather as the reason for accepting the coaching position. Minato arrives at his mentor Saionji's house to inform her about practicing kyūdō again when he encounters Masaki also visiting. He then learns that Masaki's grandfather was a friend of Saionji and later finds out about his strained relationship with him. Minato convinces Masaki to visit Osone, Akihiro and Saionji's friend, to learn more about his grandfather, which has been agreed upon by other kyūdō male team members. On the day of the tournament, the Kazemai kyūdō team learns about Masaki getting involved in a car accident after visiting Osone. Despite the news, the male team manages to be qualified for the finals after winning a tie-breaker round. In the finals between Kazemai and Kirisaki where both teams each have two missed shots, Masaki arrives from the hospital and witnesses Minato bringing the team to victory as he hit the target and Shū misses the final shot. As a result, Kazemai High School advances to the national competition. In a post-credits scene, Eisuke Nikaidō of Tsujimine High School, which also advances to the nationals, vows to crush the opponents.

== Voice cast ==
- Yūto Uemura as Minato Narumiya
- Shintarō Asanuma as Masaki Takigawa
- Aoi Ichikawa as Seiya Takehaya
- Ryōta Suzuki as Ryōhei Yamanouchi
- Shōgo Yano as Nanao Kisaragi
- Kaito Ishikawa as Kaito Onogi
- Yō Taichi as Rika Seo
- Miyuri Shimabukuro as Yūna Hanazawa
- Ayaka Nanase as Noa Shiragiku
- Kensho Ono as Shū Fujiwara
- Takuma Terashima as Hiroki Motomura
- Yu Miyazaki as Daigo Sase
- Yūsuke Kobayashi as Senichi Sugawara
- Kōhei Amasaki as Manji Sugawara
- Makoto Kaneko as Umetarō Kabashima
- Satoshi Inomata as Kaoru Yushima
- Katsumi Suzuki as Tomio Morioka
- Kōji Ishii as Nakazaki
- Makoto Yasumura as Ren Takigawa
- Kaya Matsutani as Minato's mother
- Takehiro Murozono as Minato's father
- Mitsuaki Madono as Seiya's father
- Tamie Kubota as Saionji
- Masaharu Satō as Akihiro Yasaka

== Production ==
Kyoto Animation revealed in October 2020 the production of an anime film version of Tsurune (2018–2019), which would be helmed by the anime series director Takuya Yamamura. The film received a subtitle, The First Shot (はじまりの一射, Hajimari no Issha), in March 2022. That month, Yamamura was revealed to have written the script for the film with supervision from the anime series head writer Michiko Yokote, and he was joined by the returning staff from the series, including Miku Kadowaki as the character designer, Shokō Ochiai as the art director, and Kōhei Funamoto as the cinematographer. Funamoto stated that "the parts [of the story] that were not depicted on TV are more carefully depicted" in the film with newly-drawn scenes. Yamamura described the film as a "compilation of the TV series, but it's not", stating that he had "brushed up" the animation, sound, music, and dubbing better than the anime series.

In March 2022, Yūto Uemura and Shintarō Asanuma were set to reprise their voice roles from the anime series as Minato Narumiya and Masaki Takigawa, respectively. Additional returning cast were revealed in April 2022, including Aoi Ichikawa as Seiya Takehaya, Ryōta Suzuki as Ryōhei Yamanouchi, Shōgo Yano as Nanao Kisaragi, Kaito Ishikawa as Kaito Onogi, and Kensho Ono as Shū Fujiwara. In July 2022, the film was revealed to feature 7.1 surround sound in 66 Japanese theaters upon its release. The film's post-credits scene featured the cameo appearance of the character Eisuke Nikaidō, voiced by Jun Fukuyama, who was set to appear in the second season of Tsurune.

== Music ==
In March 2022, Masaru Yokoyama was revealed to be composing Tsurune: The Movie – The First Shot, replacing Harumi Fuuki who had composed the anime series. In June 2022, Luck Life was revealed to be performing the theme song for the film titled "Hand". The song was released digitally on August 1, 2022, and is included in the film's original soundtrack, which was released in Japan on August 21.

All music is composed by Yokoyama, except where indicated.

Tsurune: The Movie – The First Shot: Original Soundtrack track listing
No.	Title	Music	Length
1.	"Tsurune the Movie - The Sound of Origin"		4:21
2.	"A Winding Road"		2:55
3.	"Body of Kyudo"		2:29
4.	"Mind of Kyudo"		1:28
5.	"Okonomeeting"		1:34
6.	"That Sound"		3:05
7.	"First and Last"		1:27
8.	"Do You Like Kyudo?"		1:21
9.	"Lost Target"		1:59
10.	"For Yourself"		1:15
11.	"One Target"		0:50
12.	"I Will Wait for You"		2:11
13.	"Question the Past"		2:12
14.	"Saionji Knows"		2:06
15.	"Masaki's Confession"		2:19
16.	"Go Masaki!"		1:28
17.	"Fly Against the Wind"		1:52
18.	"Masaki in Accident"		2:11
19.	"Eyes on the Target"		2:40
20.	"His Words"		4:04
21.	"Like a Flower"		2:30
22.	"Tailwind"		0:40
23.	"When the Rain Is Gone"		5:46
24.	"Tsurune the Movie - The First Shot"		2:08
25.	"Where the Rivers Meet"		4:53
26.	"Hand / Luck Life"	Pon	5:10
27.	"Next Season"		1:15
Total length:			66:09

== Marketing ==
The first key visual for Tsurune: The Movie – The First Shot was revealed on October 22, 2020. The second key visual and a trailer for the film were released on March 1, 2022. The main key visual and second trailer for the film were released on April 15, 2022. A new trailer featuring the film's theme song was released on June 24, 2022. The film was present during the All-Nippon Junior High School Kyūdo Tournament held on August 8–9, 2022, to promote its release. That month, a collaboration between the film and the Japanese karaoke chain Karatetsu was held.

== Release ==
=== Theatrical ===
Tsurune: The Movie – The First Shot was released in Japan on August 19, 2022. Hidive held an advanced screening of the film at the Hynes Convention Center in Boston, Massachusetts on April 8, 2023, and released it in the United States on April 9–10. The film was screened at the AnimagiC convention in Mannheim, Germany on August 4–6, 2023.

=== Home media ===
Tsurune: The Movie – The First Shot was released on Blu-ray and DVD in Japan on January 18, 2023. On the same day, the streaming service U-Next exclusively streamed the film. Wowow aired the film through their channel Wowow Cinema on August 3, 2023.

Outside Japan, Aniplus Asia aired the film in Indonesia and Thailand on January 21, 2023. Hidive began streaming the film on June 18, 2023. Sentai Filmworks released the film on Blu-ray in North America on January 9, 2024.

== Reception ==
=== Box office ===
Tsurune: The Movie – The First Shot grossed ¥125 million (US$953,030) in Japan.

=== Critical response ===
The Japanese review and survey firm Filmarks placed Tsurune: The Movie – The First Shot fourth in their first-day satisfaction ranking, with an average rating of 4.02/5, based on 102 reviews. In the program FilmWeek, KPCC film critic Charles Solomon described the film as "charming" and lauded the filmmakers for not making it "just another underdog sports tale" but to be about the "psychological and even spiritual growth of [the characters]".
