= Clutch (sports) =

Sports term

Clutch is a sports term that refers to the phenomenon where athletes excel under pressure, commonly known as "in the clutch". These moments typically occur later in the game, and involve plays that significantly impact the outcome of the game. Athletes are required to summon strength, concentration and any other qualities necessary to succeed and perform well. This phenomenon is observed in many sports including basketball, hockey, football, and esports, but the phrase is most commonly used in baseball (e.g. clutch hitter).

A contrasting phenomenon known as choking occurs when athletes fail to perform as needed, especially when they are not under pressure or are expected to win.

The study of clutch performance is a subject of interest in psychology and in the more specialized area of sport psychology. The term gained popularity due to repetitive use among sports commentators, particularly baseball announcers. Consequently, a portion of the academic literature is focused on baseball, more specifically on clutch hitting, and addresses the academic issue of whether it exists or not.

== Causes ==
A great deal of the academic literature shows that it is important for athletes to be able to control their anxiety if they are to produce peak performances in clutch moments.

=== Yerkes-Dodson Law ===
Early academic literature presents evidence for the clutch player in the Yerkes-Dodson Law. In this 1908 study, psychologists, Robert Yerkes and John Dillingham Dodson, found that stress, or arousal (pressure), increases performance to an extent, but too much or too little stress causes a decline in performance. The level of pressure necessary for maximum efficiency increases due to the task, with those tasks requiring endurance and stamina being completed with higher levels of arousal. A bell curve is often used to represent the relationship between pressure and performance as indicated by empirical evidence. The Yerkes-Dodson Law suggests that arousal has positive effects on cognitive processes such as motivation, attention, and concentration. In effect, an athlete should be able to play at an elevated level with adequate amount of pressure.

=== Individual Zone of Optimal Functioning ===
The Yerkes-Dodson Law spurred further research into its direct application in athletics. As a result, Sport psychologist, Yuri L. Hanin, developed the Zone of Optimal Functioning theory, which states, ″In order for an athlete to perform to their highest capability, they must experience their preferred level of anxiety.″ Hanin used a sport-specific version of the State-Trait Anxiety Inventory to measure the cognitive and somatic anxiety levels of each player before his or her performance. Hanin determined that each player has a certain range of pre-performance anxiety which leads to optimal performance. Hanin later postulates the functional relationship between emotions and optimal performance differs between each individual based on emotional factors, thus the revised version was called the Individual Zone of Optimal Functioning (IZOF). The newer model better accounts for ″the multidimensionality of emotional constructs″ by accounting for both positive and negative effect in athletes prior to the beginning of the sporting event. The study confirmed the existence of an ″association of the intensity of pre-competition state anxiety to optimal athletic performance.″

A majority of elite athletes perform personalized pre-game rituals in order to mentally prepare themselves for gameplay. Players may revert to these rituals immediately before the clutch moment so as to stabilize cognitive and [somatic anxiety] in order to revert to their individual zone of optimal functioning. This type of self-control is what leads to the ability to excel in the clutch.

In the world of sports, how athletes feel emotionally can greatly impact their performance. The connection between emotions and performance is explained through this theory of the Individual Zone of Optimal Functioning (IZOF). Research shows that athletes perform best when their emotions match the demands of the task at hand. Emotions that are associated with optimal performance help athletes focus their energy and apply their skills efficiently. On the opposite end of Optimal Functioning, there are non-optimal emotions that can lead to a waste of energy and skills, which causes negative performance and is commonly known as what was previously mentioned as "choking". Each athlete is different, which means that what one person may use to cope and deal with stress or honing in on their skills, might not work for another, that is the individual process for all players, even those who are on teams. The IZOF model helps identify the right emotional state for each athlete, which is the "optimal zone" as well as the negative emotional state, "non-optimal zone". It looks at the thoughts, motivation, and behavior of the athletes.

To help athletes perform their best, researchers have designed interventions that help athletes recognize where they fall in the model, and help them to process their emotional state. It allows for acceptance of the impact that emotion has on the performance and it forces them into action to regulate those emotions.

=== Cognitive behavioral therapy in sports ===
Hardy et al. (1996) researched the psychological preparation of elite athletes and found that "Cognitive-behavioral interventions are effective for the purposes of performance enhancement." A number of cognitive-behavioral therapies have since been incorporated into the field of athletics in order to help athletes self-regulate their anxiety during sporting events. One of the most common techniques used is mental visualization. Miguel Humara explains that ″Imagery and mental rehearsal of tasks are beneficial for the individual seeking to improve athletic performance. These tactics provide familiarity with the task at hand and also provide positive feedback of their imagined performance.″ Mental visualization allows elite athletes, who are consciously aware of his or her abilities, to complete the task more naturally and with higher coordination. Players are able to boost self-confidence by picturing themselves taking the shot, hitting, throwing, or catching the ball, etc. before the play actually occurs.

The situation presented here is ideal when a stoppage of play, such as a timeout, occurs directly before the clutch moment. The timeout situation allows coaches to make adjustments and call plays uniquely designed for late-game situations. Players have often simulated and successfully completed multiple repetitions of the shot or play in practices throughout the season and preseason. In team sports, the previous exposure to the situation at hand, even if only simulated, allows the group to understand the plan and act cohesively when executing. On the individual level, mental visualization enables a player, before action even resumes, to focus on the mechanics and techniques necessary to achieve a favorable outcome. The player may consider situational factors, such as a specific angle and motion to utilize or a speed at which he or she must accelerate. For Kobe Bryant, this may mean making sure that he extends his leg when shooting his signature fade away jumper.

=== Practice-Specificity-Based Model of Arousal ===
The "Practice-Specificity-Based Model of Arousal" (Movahedi, 2007) holds that, for best and peak performances to occur, athletes need only to create an arousal level similar to the one they have experienced throughout training sessions. For peak performance, athletes do not need to have high or low arousal levels. It is important that they create the same level of arousal throughout training sessions and competition. In other words, high levels of arousal can be beneficial if athletes experience such heightened levels of arousal during some consecutive training sessions. Similarly, low levels of arousal can be beneficial if athletes experience such low levels of arousal during some consecutive training sessions.

== In-game situations ==
=== Basketball ===
Clutch situations are commonly defined from an offensive perspective, but clutch moments may also come in the form of defensive plays. Coaches of the defending team often use the tactic of calling one timeout immediately following another late-game timeout. The latter of the two is called after the players have entered into the playing area but before play resumes, allowing the coaching staff to see how the opposing team sets up their offense and giving them an opportunity to scheme a defensive tactic that gives their team the best opportunity to win. Teams then execute the gameplan and are sometimes able to make remarkable comebacks.

In the 2016 NCAA Division I men's basketball tournament, the Texas A&M Aggies made an improbable comeback against the Northern Iowa Panthers. The Aggies’ defense forced four turnovers while their offense scored 14 points, all in less than 35 seconds. The 14-2 scoring run tied the game at the end of regulation, although the Aggies had only about a 1-in-3,333 chance of winning just 44 seconds of gameplay earlier. The game extended into double overtime where Texas A&M claimed a 99-88 victory over Northern Iowa.

=== Statistical analysis ===
Statistical analysis has vastly improved with the evolution of technology. Today, computer software allows statisticians to track, analyze, and compare a broad range of statistics, even in terms of specific game situations. Sports organizations, such as the National Football League, have entire branches devoted to analytics. Sports analytic researchers use sports science to present data on optimal practice lengths and days of rests. During gameplay, they also communicate directly with the coaching staff to make game decisions based on present and potential situations, which can be especially important when determining the play call for the clutch play. Statistical analysis researchers are able to assess the current game situation given data from recent (within the same game) and historical (earlier in the season or in previous seasons) games. Researchers provide information pertaining to where specific players are most effective in a given situation, such as in the clutch. Therefore, they can provide coaches with empirical evidence for choosing certain plays and present them with the probability of alternative options. Statistical analysis helps to highlight the significance of clutch moments. ESPN's Sport Science host, John Brenkus analyzes hundreds of moments, players, and performances in the world of sports. Players across a number of sports recreate sports circumstances in a lab-like setting. Sport Science simulates in-game situations in a lab-like setting and analyzes, from a scientific perspective, individual aspects of the player's performance, probability of success given the circumstances, and additional influencing factors.

== See also ==
- Closer (baseball)
- Choke (sports)
- Zona Cesarini
