= Choke (sports) =

Sports term

In sports, choking is the failure of a person, or team, to act or behave as well as anticipated or expected. This can occur in a game or tournament that they are strongly favoured to win, or in an instance where they have a large lead that they squander in the late stages of the event. It can also refer to repeated failures in the same event, or simply imply an unexpected failure when the event is more important than usual.

Most athletes experience physical and mental changes during stages of increased tension in competition. They may change their strategy as a coping mechanism, and play more cautiously as a result. In instances where this strategy fails, a player or team may lose confidence to the point of panic, where they are incapable of completing the most rudimentary of tasks. Choking in sport can be considered a form of analysis paralysis.

The term itself is often an over-used, or even derisive term in the sports world, where "choke" status might be assigned to a team or player that was simply unlucky. A double standard also exists where the choke status is not assigned to players or teams that perform poorly under pressure but are somehow still able to win, but the choke could be assigned to players or teams that perform well under pressure but still lose. The term "clutch" is used to describe the opposite of choking.

== Choking ==
Choking under pressure decreases the standard level of athletic performance, of an athlete when they may be at their peak performance. Symptoms of choking may include tightening up of the muscles, an increased level of anxiety and a decrease in self-confidence. Choking can leave an athlete feeling embarrassed or frustrated.

== Causes ==
Choking is sometimes caused when an athlete becomes distracted, their thoughts become negative or unproductive and when they worry about things they cannot control. Anxiety is built up from negative self-talk and doubt which leads to choking. The source of the pressure can vary, which leads to the choking itself manifesting in different ways. In some instances a player or team's first game, or a big occasion can lead to anxiety similar to stage fright, which may result in a poor start, or being on the receiving end of a rout. In other instances, the closeness of victory leads to increased anxiety, which may in turn lead to a dramatic loss.

In the chaotic arena of a sporting contest, it is sometimes hard to identify if a player or team has panicked, or was simply victim to a strong finish by their opponents. Many athletes will play down publicly any notion of a loss of nerve, to prevent this being seen as a weakness.

== Brain science behind choking ==
The new findings in sport neuroscience suggest that disturbances in neural efficiency and coordination of motor networks could cause pressure choking. Top performers typically have streamlined brain activity compared to amateurs, especially in motor and attentional networks. When pressure is added, however, increased self-monitoring and worry come to change these optimized neural systems, and inefficient motor control results. It is usually noted as changes in brain activity, like increased frontal activation or altered EEG alpha rhythms. Inhibitory control, action prediction, and motor readiness are the key processes of the central nervous system. These are also impaired when an athlete's level of arousal is higher than their optimal level. These findings suggest that choking is not psychological but rather has something to do with the way that the brain handles movement under stress.

=== Explicit monitoring theory ===
The explicit monitoring theory provides an explanation for athlete's under-performance at the precise moment they need to be at their best. Sian Beilock and Tom Carr suggest that "pressure raises self-consciousness and anxiety about performing correctly, which increases the attention paid to skill processes and their step-by-step control. Attention to execution at this step-by-step level is thought to disrupt well-learned or proceduralized performances."

=== Distraction theory ===
Distraction theory was first suggested by Wine to explain under-performance in performance pressure situations. Distraction theorists argue that pressure creates a dual task situation which draws attention away from the task at hand. Attention is then focused towards irrelevant stimuli such as worries, social expectations, and anxiety. Wine first tested his hypothesis with academic tests but it has since been applied to athletics.

Research has found that distraction theory is supported in situations where working memory is used to analyze and make decisions quickly. Short-term memory is used to maintain relevant stimuli and block irrelevant information as it relates to the task at hand.

A study at Arizona University looked at how athletes of different levels of experiences responded to distraction and self-analysis, and found that novice baseball players were more likely to see a drop in performance from a distracting noise. However, it also found that more experienced players were more susceptible to underperformance when they were asked to focus on their technique.

=== Self-focus theory ===
This theory predicts a decrease in performance is due to attention being shifted to movement execution. Any combination of factors that increase the importance of performing is considered performance pressure. Baumeister's self-focus theory suggests responding to performance pressure can lead to an increase in self-consciousness which then results in choking. There is more focus on the motor components of performance, consciously controlling movements with step-by-step control.

=== Processing efficiency theory (PET) ===
Anxiety causes a shift in an athlete's attention towards thought of performance consequences and failure. An increase in worry decreases attention resources. According to PET, athletes put extra effort into their performance when under pressure, to eliminate negative performance. Eysenck and Calvo found processing efficiency is affected by negative anxiety more than performance effectiveness. Efficiency being the relationship between the quality of task performance and the effort spent in task performance.

=== Attentional control theory (ACT) ===
Eysenck and Calvo developed ACT an extension to PET, hypothesizing an individual shifts attention to irrelevant stimuli. Stress and pressure cause an increase in the stimulus-driven system and a decrease in the goal-directed system. Disruption of balance between these two systems causes the individual to respond to salient stimuli rather than focusing on current goals. ACT identifies the basic central executive functions inhibition and shifting, which are affected by anxiety. Inhibition is the ability to minimize distractions caused from irrelevant stimuli. Shifting requires adapting to changes in attentional control. Shifting back and forth between mental sets due to task demands.

=== Attentional threshold model ===
According to the attentional threshold model, a performance decrement is caused by exceeded threshold of attentional capacity. This model combines both the self-focus models and the distraction models. The combination of worry and self-focus together causes a decrease in performance. Attentional Threshold Model suggests that choking is a complex process involving cognitive, emotional and attentional factors.

== Contributing factors ==
Factors of choking may include, individual responsibility, expectations, poor preparation, self-confidence, physical/mental errors, important games/moments and opponent's actions.

=== Fear of negative evaluation ===
FNE is a psychological characteristic that increases anxiety under high pressure. It creates apprehension about others' evaluations or expectations of oneself. FNE is similar to motive to avoid failure (MaF). The need to avoid negative evaluation from others, avoid mistakes and avoid negative comparison to other players.

=== Presence of an audience ===
The presence of parents, coaches, media or scouts can increase pressure leading to choking. An athlete wants to perform their best while being observed and trying not to make any mistakes increases the amount of pressure they are under.

=== Self-confidence ===
Being over-confident can cause negativity to take over quickly. Not expecting something negative to happen can cause a choke. Having low self-confidence leads to more mistakes, because you do not think you can do anything.

A study done by Wang, Marchant, Morris and Gibbs (2004) found poor performance associated with high self-conscious individuals. An individual with high self-consciousness focuses their attention to thoughts relating to the task (i.e., "did I step right?") and to outside concerns (i.e., "will people laugh if I mess up?"). Individuals with low self-consciousness can direct their attention outward or inward because self-concerns do not dominate their thinking.

=== Experience and skill ===
A study done by Klein Teeselink, Potter van Loon, Van den Assem and Van Dolder (2018) found that professional darts players are substantially less susceptible of choking than amateurs and youngsters.

== Choking and individual zone of optimal functioning ==
According to the Individual Zones of Optimal Functioning theory (IZOF), proposed by Russian social and sport psychologist Yuri Hanin as an instance of the earlier-discovered Yerkes–Dodson law, an individual's best performance is when their anxiety level is in a certain zone of optimal state of anxiety or affect. Too much or too little anxiety can lead to performance decrement. Determining athletes' optimal prestart state anxiety level leads to achieving and maintaining that level throughout the performance.

Choking can occur if the athlete is outside their anxiety zone. Programs such as IZOF help identify an athlete's anxiety zone creating a balance between arousal and somatic anxiety. Low arousal can lead to broad attention taking in irrelevant and relevant cues. High arousal can create low attention causing important cues being missed.

For example a lacrosse goalie with low arousal may focus more on whether or not a college scout is watching them, rather than focusing on the opponent who is about to score on them. A lacrosse goalie with high arousal may focus more on the opponents stick position instead of the opponent's body position, causing them to step in the wrong direction.

== Choking and performance anxiety in male and female athletes ==
There have been a number of studies that investigate performance anxiety in male and female athletes. In a study that investigated performance anxiety with an emphasis on gender and sport played, 601 Portuguese athletes (172 female and 429 male) ranging from ages 12 to 47 competed in a variety of individual and team sports. The athletes competed the Portuguese version of the Sport Anxiety Scale-SAS-2, which had questions that were designed to reflect what young athletes might have felt before or during sports competition. The scale is a measure of sports related anxiety that considers both cognitive and somatic trait anxiety. Some examples of these items that were on the assessment include "My body feels tense" or "I lose focus on the game". A number of statistical analyses were performed to understand the implications of the data and significant differences were noted between male and female athletes. Female athletes presented notably higher levels of general sports anxiety in comparison to the males in the study. The results of this research provided evidence that sport-related anxiety appears in survey results in different magnitudes based on gender, with female athletes being more anxious about their performance.

Another paper focused on achievement goals of athletes coupled with gender and their on anxiety in national elite sports. In this study, the roles of achievement orientation, perception of the motivational climate, and perceived ability on performance trait anxiety in a sample of national level elite athletes were analyzed in an effort to understand the gender differences in these traits. The method included results from 189 Norwegian athletes. This included 101 male and 89 female athletes, all of which participated in individual player sports and completed measures of the roles listed above. This study results allowed the researchers to discover that female and male athletes had similar achievement orientations and perceptions of the motivation climate. However, even though the results of perceived ability had initially predicted that females would have less performance anxiety, females still reported higher levels of performance and somatic anxiety and were less concentrated overall.

A study was also completed with high school and college track and field athletes that analyzed cognitive and somatic anxiety and confidence and their impact on gender and competitive characteristics. The 216 athletes completed a survey called the Competitive State Anxiety Inventory-2 (CSAI-2) within 20 minutes after each event they competed in at a high-level relay meet. The study revealed that male athletes had lower somatic anxiety and higher self-confidence than their female counterparts. The results of this American-based study support the previously discussed findings in both Portugal and Norway that female athletes report more performance and sport related anxiety than male athletes, showing that research from several populations worldwide seem to line up in terms of the results of each study. This allows similar conclusions about anxiety in athletes based on gender, since in each study, female athletes show more performance anxiety than their male counterparts and this correlation appears in every sport that has been analyzed.

== Examples of choking in sports ==
=== American football ===
In a Wild Card playoff matchup between the Buffalo Bills and the Houston Oilers on January 3, 1993, the Oilers choked a 32-point lead to lose in overtime. This is the largest blown lead in a playoff game in NFL history and the second largest overall, after the Indianapolis Colts blew a 33-point lead to the Minnesota Vikings in Week 15 of the 2022 season. This game is known to this day as The Comeback, or locally in Houston as The Choke.

In Super Bowl LI, the Atlanta Falcons choked away a 25-point lead to the New England Patriots, after holding a 28–3 lead late in the 3rd quarter. Tied 28–28, the game went to sudden death overtime, where the Patriots would score a game winning touchdown. This was the first Super Bowl to be decided in overtime, with Super Bowl LVIII being the only other instance this has occurred. Due to the Falcons' offense never having the chance to receive the ball during the overtime, the NFL would further amend playoff overtime rules following Super Bowl LI to allow both teams one possession before the sudden death effect occurs.

=== Association football ===
The England national football team has been noted in the last 30 years, especially for their under-performance in major tournaments, and for their lack of success in penalty shootouts.

In the first knockout round of the 2016–17 UEFA Champions League, Paris Saint-Germain F.C. lost a 4-goal aggregate lead to FC Barcelona. PSG had won the first leg at home by 4–0 and had scored an away goal at the Camp Nou to lead 5–3 on aggregate after 88 minutes. However, two late goals from Neymar and a stoppage-time winner from Sergi Roberto gave Barcelona a 6–1 win on the night and a 6–5 triumph on aggregate. Some commentators have called this one of the biggest chokes in footballing history.

On matchday 3 during Bundesliga season 2022/23, Borussia Dortmund choked against Werder Bremen, who had just been promoted from 2. Bundesliga. Dortmund was leading 2–0 for 88 minutes but still managed to lose the match 2-3.

=== Australian rules football ===
Although the Collingwood Football Club are one of the most successful teams in the AFL, between their titles in 1958 and 1990, they lost eight successive Grand Finals. Most notably they lost a 44-point lead in the 1970 Grand Final to Carlton, the then second largest lead lost in the history of the AFL. They also previously lost to St Kilda in 1966 by a single point, and later lost the 1977 Grand Final in a replay to North Melbourne, having tied the first match. Their losing run was dubbed 'The Collywobbles'.

=== Baseball ===
In 2004, the New York Yankees won the first three games of the American League Championship Series over the Boston Red Sox and held a 4–3 lead in the bottom of the ninth inning in Game 4, needing three outs to advance to the World Series. Closer Mariano Rivera gave up a walk and a single that allowed the tying run, and the Red Sox won on a 12th-inning walk-off home run by David Ortiz. The Yankees went on to lose the next three games to become the first team in MLB history to lose a best-of-seven series after leading three games to none.

=== Cricket ===
South Africa suffered upset losses against the West Indies in 1996 and New Zealand in 2011.

In the 2013 Champions Trophy final against India, England batted second and got into a position of needing just 20 runs off the last 16 balls, with six wickets in hand, but lost four wickets in the space of eight balls and lost the match by five runs.

In the 2018 Big Bash League final, the Melbourne Stars were on track to win the Big Bash League title against the Melbourne Renegades at 0-93, with the Stars needing just 57 runs from the last 48 balls. However, the Stars went on to experience a 7-19 collapse, resulting in a 13 run loss.

=== Darts ===
Peter Wright missed six match darts in the 2017 Premier League Darts final against world champion Michael van Gerwen, eventually losing the match and forgoing the accompanying £250,000 of prize money. An analysis of tens of thousands of darts matches by Klein Teeselink, Potter van Loon, Van den Assem and Van Dolder (2018) showed that this is a general phenomenon: amateur and youth darts players display a sizable decrease in performance at decisive moments. Professional players, however, were found to be less susceptible to choking under pressure.

=== Golf ===
Greg Norman was leading the 1996 Masters Tournament by six strokes after three rounds, but scored a 6 over par 78 to allow Nick Faldo to win by five strokes, with a 5 under par 67.

Jean van de Velde only needed a double-bogey 6 to win the 1999 British Open. Instead he scored a triple-bogey 7 on the 18th hole and entered a play-off which he lost.

Rory McIlroy led the 2011 Masters Tournament from the start of the tournament, and led by 4 strokes before the final round, but ended up falling out of the top ten at the tournament, after dropping six shots in three holes in the closing stages. Rory similarly led the 2024 U.S. Open but bogeyed three of the final four holes of the tournament, including two missed putts from within four feet of the cup.

Scott Hoch's miss at the US Masters in 1989 resulted in him sometimes being known as "Hoch the Choke".

=== Ice hockey ===
Four NHL teams have taken a 3–0 series lead in the Stanley Cup Playoffs, only to lose 4–3 in the best-of-seven series: the 1942 Detroit Red Wings, the 1975 Pittsburgh Penguins, the 2010 Boston Bruins and the 2014 San Jose Sharks.

In Game 3 of the first round of the 1982 Stanley Cup Playoffs, the heavily favored Edmonton Oilers, led by NHL legend Wayne Gretzky, lost a 5–0 lead to the Los Angeles Kings. The Kings won 6–5 in overtime and pulled off the stunning upset knocking off the Oilers 3–2. The Kings ended up losing in the second round against the Vancouver Canucks, who advanced to the championship round.

The Toronto Maple Leafs have been known for losing leads in the playoffs despite winning 13 championships, with their last championship being in 1967 and facing a 19-year playoff series win drought between 2004 and 2022. The Maple Leafs' rivalry with fellow Original Six team Boston Bruins has also resulted in multiple losses attributed to choking. As of 2024, Toronto have not beaten Boston in a playoff series since 1959, losing six postseason series, 4 of which have gone to 7 games. In Game 7 against the Bruins in the first round of the 2013 Stanley Cup playoffs, the Maple Leafs lost 5–4 in overtime, despite leading 4–1 throughout most of the game. Toronto would go on to be eliminated in the first round of both the 2018 and 2019 Stanley Cup playoffs, falling both times to Boston in 7 games. In the 2021 Stanley Cup playoffs, the Maple Leafs blew a 3–1 lead against the Montreal Canadiens, suffering their eighth straight loss in potential series-clinching games. The Toronto Sun ran pages with the title "Running Choke", and Auston Matthews and Mitch Marner received criticism following the loss.

=== Snooker ===
Snooker, where a player's nerves are an important aspect of the game, produces many instances where a player fails to close out a match, or are unable to produce on the big stage. Mike Hallett was leading 7–0 and 8–2 in the Masters final, a first to nine frames match against Stephen Hendry, before Hendry came back to win 9–8.

Jimmy White reached the final of the World Snooker Championship six times, and lost each time, against Steve Davis, John Parrott and Stephen Hendry. Notably he lost a 14–8 lead to Hendry in 1992, losing 18–14. Two years later he missed a black off its spot in the final and deciding frame to gift Hendry another title. To add insult to injury, it was his 32nd birthday on the day.

=== Tennis ===
In the 1993 Wimbledon final, Steffi Graf played Jana Novotná. After Novotná lost the first set, she won 10 of the last 12 games, leading 4–1, serving at 40–30. She then hit the worst 2 serves of her career, and went on to eventually lose 6–7, 6–1, 4–6.

=== Basketball ===
In the 2015–16 NBA season, the Golden State Warriors surrendered a 3–1 NBA Finals lead to the Cleveland Cavaliers, led by LeBron James. Golden State, who had the best regular-season record in NBA history, lost three straight games, including game 5 when Draymond Green was suspended.

== See also ==
- Blunder (chess)
- Clutch (sports)
- Stage fright
- Target panic
- The Yips
- List of teams to overcome 3–1 series deficits
- List of teams to overcome 3–0 series deficits
