= Clutch hitter =

Baseball concept

A clutch hitter is a baseball player who is seemingly adept at getting a hit in high-pressure situations, i.e. in the clutch. This usually refers to getting a hit (particularly a home run) when the player's team is trailing late in a game and needs to score to tie or take the lead, especially if there are already two outs in the inning and/or the batter already has two strikes. That said, a clutch hit can occur at any point in the game if the circumstances are similarly high-stakes. Establishing a reputation as a clutch hitter is desirable for a player. Although clutch hits are recorded no differently than any other hit for statistical purposes, the notion that a player is more likely to produce clutch hits compared to other players can be advantageous in contract negotiations (especially in the modern free agency system).

== Criticism ==
The question of whether clutch hitting is a genuine skill possessed by certain players, or if a player is actually no more likely to produce a hit in a clutch situation than at any other point in the game, is frequently debated.

Some baseball analysts, including Bill James, Pete Palmer and Dick Cramer, and the editors of Baseball Prospectus, have concluded that clutch hitting is not a real skill. According to Joe Sheehan of Baseball Prospectus, "there is virtually no evidence that any player or group of players possesses an ability to outperform his established level of ability in clutch situations, however defined." In his 1984 Baseball Abstract, James framed the question of clutch hitting this way: "How is it that a player who possesses the reflexes and the batting stroke and the knowledge and the experience to be a .262 hitter in other circumstances magically becomes a .300 hitter when the game is on the line? How does that happen? What is the process? What are the effects? Until we can answer those questions, I see little point in talking about clutch ability."

== Clutch hitters ==
Most studies on the subject compare performances across seasons in categories of statistics considered "clutch" (getting a hit with runners in scoring position, getting a hit late in a close game, etc.). If clutch hitting were an identifiable skill, one would expect that players considered "clutch" would perform well in the relevant statistics season-to-season, i.e. the correlation coefficient between players' performances over multiple years would be high. But Cramer's study found that clutch hitting statistics between seasons for the same ostensibly clutch player varied widely; in fact, the variance was akin to what one would expect if the numbers had been selected randomly. Since Cramer published his results, others have similarly searched for evidence that clutch hitting is a skill, but these studies have only tended to confirm Cramer's findings: the notion that certain players are consistently able to raise their level of play in high-stakes situations is an illusion.

Despite this, the idea of clutch hitters persists across baseball, from casual fans to managers to the players themselves. In an interview with Sports Illustrated, New York Yankees shortstop Derek Jeter criticized analysts who deny that clutch hitting is a skill, saying: "You can take those stat guys and throw them out the window." Other proponents cite Alex Rodriguez's perceived struggles in clutch situations over his career as anecdotal evidence that even some otherwise great statistical hitters like Rodriguez (a three-time AL MVP) become different players with a different playing ability in the clutch (in the case of Rodriguez, for the worse).

Jeter, for one, provides an example of the discrepancy between the perception and reality of clutch hitting. Though widely considered a clutch hitter (and so nicknamed "Mr. November"), Jeter's career batting average, on-base percentage, and slugging percentage (BA/OBP/SLG) are .317/.388/.462, while the same statistics over Jeter's career postseason play (when the stakes are higher) are .309/.377/.469, so either slightly worse or not meaningfully better. Similarly, Jeter first earned the moniker "Mr. November" after a walk-off home run to win Game 4 of the 2001 World Series, but his overall offensive statistics for that series (.148/.179/.259) were in fact relatively poor.

Also, there may occasionally be a confusion between correlation and causation in the case of clutch hits. For example, if a batter who is otherwise struggling is suddenly able to get a hit with the bases loaded, it may be that the bases became loaded due to bad pitching, and so the batter's hitting ability may not have improved "in the clutch," so much as the pitching became worse.

This is not to say that it is impossible for a player's psychological handling of high-pressure situations to impact (positively or negatively) their performance, i.e. confidence in one's clutch hitting ability begetting clutch hits or a lack of confidence begetting "choking." However, there is scant statistical evidence that this is widespread or that certain players are inherently more adept at clutch hitting in the long term relative to their normal hitting ability.
