= Tsurune =

Japanese light novel and its adaptations

- Light novel cover

ツルネ -風舞高校弓道部- (Tsurune: Kazemai Kōkō Kyūdō-bu)
- Genre: Sports (archery)
- Light novel
- Written by: Kotoko Ayano
- Illustrated by: Chinatsu Morimoto
- Published by: Kyoto Animation
- Imprint: KA Esuma Bunko
- Original run: December 26, 2016 – present
- Volumes: 3
- Anime television series
- Directed by: Takuya Yamamura
- Written by: Michiko Yokote
- Music by: Harumi Fūki (#1–13); Masaru Yokoyama (#14–26)
- Studio: Kyoto Animation
- Licensed by: AUS/NA: Sentai Filmworks; SEA: Plus Media Networks Asia (season 2)
- Original network: NHK General TV (season 1); Tokyo MX, ABC TV, BS11, AT-X (season 2)
- Original run: October 22, 2018 – March 30, 2023
- Episodes: 26 + 1 OVA
- Anime film
- Tsurune: The Movie – The First Shot

Tsurune (Japanese: ツルネ -風舞高校弓道部-, Hepburn: Tsurune: Kazemai Kōkō Kyūdō-bu; lit. 'Kazemai High School Archery Team') is a Japanese light novel series written by Kotoko Ayano, with illustrations by Chinatsu Morimoto. The first novel won a Special Judge Award in the Kyoto Animation Award competition in 2016, and was published by the studio in December of that year.

An anime television series adaptation, produced by Kyoto Animation, aired from October 2018 to January 2019. A compilation film premiered in August 2022. A second season aired from January to March 2023.

== Plot ==
Minato Narumiya used to be in his middle school's kyūdō club until a certain incident in his last tournament caused him to resolve to quit archery for good. When he attends high school, his childhood friends Seiya Takehaya and Ryōhei Yamanouchi try to rope him into joining the high school's kyūdō club again, but he refuses. However, an encounter with a mysterious man at an archery range at a shinto shrine in a forest inspires Minato to take up archery once more. Minato joins the Kazemai High School Kyūdō Club and along with his old friends and new teammates, Nanao Kisaragi and Kaito Onogi, they aim for winning the prefectural tournament.

== Characters ==
=== Kazemai High School Archery Club ===
Minato Narumiya (鳴宮湊, Narumiya Minato)
Voiced by: Yūto Uemura (Japanese); Bryson Baugus (English)
Minato is a first-year student. He is childhood friends with Seiya and Ryohei. A teammate of Shu and Seiya in Middle School. He's in the boys team of kyūdō. He and Shu had the same archery teacher before going to the same middle school. His mother died in an accident that also injured him, and he now performs many domestic chores at his home, such as cooking meals. He lives across the street from Seiya. He begins the series with target panic, which in his case manifests as a tendency to loose his arrow too quickly and miss the target.
Seiya Takehaya (竹早静弥, Takehaya Seiya)
Voiced by: Aoi Ichikawa (Japanese); Gareth West (English)
Seiya is a first-year student. He is childhood friends with Minato and Ryohei. A teammate of Shu and Minato in middle school. He's also the club head and captain of the boys' team. Seiya is intelligent, first in his class at Kazemai, and while he doesn't like to talk about himself he obviously highly values his relationship with Minato even to the extent of leaving the more prestigious Kirisaki school system to follow him to Kazemai, wanting to convince him to restart Kyudo.
Ryōhei Yamanouchi (山之内遼平, Yamanouchi Ryōhei)
Voiced by: Ryōta Suzuki (Japanese); Gabriel Regojo (English)
Ryohei is a first-year student. He is Minato and Seiya's childhood friend. He went to a different middle school as his friends, but met back up in high school. He's in the boys team of kyūdō. He is a relative novice, having begun kyūdō late in middle school after seeing Minato in a match.
Nanao Kisaragi (如月七緒, Kisaragi Nanao)
Voiced by: Shōgo Yano (Japanese); Clint Bickham (English)
Nanao is a first-year student. He is also Kaito's cousin. He's in the boys team of kyūdō. He is cheerful and seemingly superficial and has many female admirers.
Kaito Onogi (小野木海斗, Onogi Kaito)
Voiced by: Kaito Ishikawa (Japanese); Courtland Johnson (English)
Kaito is a first-year student. He is also Nanao's cousin. He's in the boys team of kyūdō. He takes kyūdō very seriously and is highly critical of those that he thinks do not. Many first year beginners in the club cited their fear of him as a reason they quit the club.
Rika Seo (妹尾 梨可, Seo Rika)
Voiced by: Yō Taichi (Japanese); Avery Smithhart (English)
Rika is a first-year student. She is the captain of the girls' team. The other girls greatly admire her.
Noa Shiragiku (白菊 乃愛, Shiragiku Noa)
Voiced by: Ayaka Nanase (Japanese); Elissa Cuellar (English)
Noa is a first-year student. She's in the girls team of kyūdō.
Yūna Hanazawa (花沢 ゆうな, Hanazawa Yūna)
Voiced by: Miyuri Shimabukuro (Japanese); Savanna Menzel (English)
Yuna is a first-year student. She's in the girls team of kyūdō.
Tomio Morioka (森岡 富男, Morioka Tomio)
Voiced by: Katsumi Suzuki (Japanese); Ty Mahany (English)
Tomio, also called Tommy-sensei or the Oni Archer, is the teacher who acts as the Kyūdō Club advisor. He holds a 6-dan rank in kyūdō but his back often goes out soon after he shoots.
Masaki Takigawa (滝川 雅貴, Takigawa Masaki)
Voiced by: Shintarō Asanuma (Japanese); Joe Daniels (English)
Masaki is a Senior Shrine Priest at Yuta Shrine, later becomes the coach for the Kyūdō Club. He holds a 5-dan rank in kyūdō. At one point he, like Minato, had target panic and temporarily lost his ability to shoot properly.

=== Kirisaki High School Archery Club ===
Shū Fujiwara (藤原 愁, Fujiwara Shū)
Voiced by: Kensho Ono (Japanese); Scott Gibbs (English)
Shu is a first-year Student, also the former teammate of Minato and Seiya in middle school. He and Minato had the same archery teacher before going to the same middle school. Stoic and solitary, he values his rivalry with Minato but considers motivations unlike his own to be unworthy.
Daigo Sase (Sase Daigo)
Voiced by: Yu Miyazaki (Japanese); Adam Gibbs (English)
Daigo is a third-year student. He's also the vice-captain of the Kyūdō Club.
Senichi Sugawara (Sugawara Senichi)
Voiced by: Yūsuke Kobayashi (Japanese); Greg Cote (English)
Senichi is a first-year student. He is the identical twin to Manji, who is in the same club. Seemingly interchangeable with his brother, they viciously mock competitors and look down on those they don't see as talented. They both use an unusually quick release style but remain highly accurate archers.
Manji Sugawara (Sugawara Manji)
Voiced by: Kōhei Amasaki (Japanese); Anthony Hunter (English)
Manji is a first-year student. He is the identical twin to Senichi, who is in the same club. Seemingly interchangeable with his brother, they viciously mock competitors and look down on those they don't see as talented. They both use an unusually quick release style but remain highly accurate archers.
Hiroki Motomura (Motomura Hiroki)
Voiced by: Takuma Terashima (Japanese); Mike Haimoto (English)
Hiroki is a third-year student who is the captain of the Kyūdō Club.

=== Tsujimine High School Archery Club ===
Eisuke Nikaidō (二階堂 永亮, Nikaidō Eisuke)
Voiced by: Jun Fukuyama
Kōshirō Fuwa (不破 晃士郎, Fuwa Kōshirō)
Voiced by: Takayuki Kondo
Tōma Higuchi (樋口 柊馬, Higuchi Tōma)
Voiced by: Yūya Hirose
Reiji Aragaki (荒垣 黎司, Aragaki Reiji)
Voiced by: Yūichirō Umehara
Kenyū Ōtaguro (大田黒 賢有, Ōtaguro Kenyū)
Voiced by: Yōhei Azakami

== Media ==
=== Light novels ===
No.	Release date	ISBN
1	December 26, 2016	978-4-907064-59-4
2	February 9, 2018	978-4-907064-77-8
3	August 19, 2022	978-4-910052-29-8

=== Anime ===
An anime television series adaptation was originally scheduled to premiere on October 15, but due to organizational issues, the series aired from October 22, 2018, to January 21, 2019, on NHK. (Note: From the television network it lists the show at 24:10 on October 21, which is at October 22, 2018, at 12:10 a.m.) The series was produced by Kyoto Animation and was directed by Takuya Yamamura, with Michiko Yokote handling the series' scripts, and Miku Kadowaki designing the characters. Harumi Fūki composed the series' music. The opening theme song is "Naru" by Luck Life, and the ending theme is "Orange-iro" (オレンジ色) by ChouCho. The series was simulcast by Crunchyroll. Sentai Filmworks has acquired the series for distribution in North America, Australasia, South America, and other territories. An unaired 14th episode was screened at an event on March 3, 2019, and released with the first Blu-ray/DVD on May 1, 2019, with Crunchyroll later releasing it in English.

On October 22, 2020, it was revealed that the series would be receiving a new anime film project. The film, titled Tsurune: The Movie – The First Shot (劇場版ツルネ －はじまりの一射－, Gekijōban Tsurune: Hajimari no Issha), premiered in Japan on August 19, 2022. It serves as a compilation of the first season with new scenes.

On the day of the film's premiere, it was announced that the series would be receiving a second season, subtitled The Linking Shot (つながりの一射, Tsunagari no Issha), with Yamamura returning as director. It premiered on January 5, 2023, and ended on March 30, 2023. The opening theme song is "°C" by Luck Life, and the ending theme song is "Hitominaka" (ヒトミナカ) by Tei.

==== Season 1 ====
No.	Title	Directed by	Written by	Original release date
1	"The Boy Suddenly Takes the Archery Grounds"; Transliteration: "Shōnen wa Yaniwa ni" (Japanese: 少年は矢庭に)	Takuya Yamamura	Michiko Yokote	October 22, 2018
2	"Tense as a Bowstring"; Transliteration: "Ya mo Tate mo Tamarazu" (Japanese: 矢も楯も堪らず)	Haruka Fujita	Michiko Yokote	October 29, 2018
3	"Straight After the Meeting"; Transliteration: "Deai no Yasaki" (Japanese: 出会いの矢先)	Yasuhiro Takemoto	Hiroyuki Yoshino	November 5, 2018
4	"A Mismatch"; Transliteration: "Awanai Hazu" (Japanese: 合わない筈)	Shinpei Sawa	Michiko Yokote	November 12, 2018
5	"Bolt From the Blue"; Transliteration: "Ya no Tsukai de" (Japanese: 矢の使いで)	Taichi Ogawa	Michiko Yokote	November 19, 2018
6	"Reason to Shoot"; Transliteration: "Yumihiku Wake" (Japanese: 弓引く理由)	Naoko Yamada	Michiko Yokote	November 26, 2018
7	"Reunion"; Transliteration: "Sai, kai" (Japanese: 再、会)	Noriyuki Kitanohara	Hiroyuki Yoshino	December 3, 2018
8	"Pointing the Arrow"; Transliteration: "Ya o Mukete" (Japanese: 矢を向けて)	Minoru Ōta	Hiroyuki Yoshino	December 10, 2018
9	"Unrevealed Hand"; Transliteration: "Akasenu Tenouchi" (Japanese: 明かせぬ手の内)	Eisaku Kawanami	Michiko Yokote	December 17, 2018
10	"Inseparable Heart"; Transliteration: "Hanarenu Kokoro" (Japanese: 離れぬ心)	Yasuhiro Takemoto	Michiko Yokote	December 24, 2018
11	"Unreachable Pain"; Transliteration: "Karahazu no Itami" (Japanese: 空筈の痛み)	Shinpei Sawa	Hiroyuki Yoshino	January 7, 2019
12	"Five Arrows"; Transliteration: "Gohon no Ya" (Japanese: 五本の矢)	Taichi Ogawa	Hiroyuki Yoshino	January 14, 2019
13	"Irreplaceable"; Transliteration: "Kakegae no Nai" (Japanese: かけがえのない)	Minoru Ōta; Takuya Yamamura	Michiko Yokote	January 21, 2019
OVA	"For Better or Worse"; Transliteration: "Yabai" (Japanese: 矢場い)	Noriyuki Kitanohara	Michiko Yokote	March 3, 2019

==== Season 2 ====
No.	Title	Directed by	Written by	Original release date
1	"Summer Calls"; Transliteration: "Natsu e no Yagoe" (Japanese: 夏への矢声)	Takuya Yamamura	Michiko Yokote	January 5, 2023
2	"All in the Mind"; Transliteration: "Ki wa, Wa o Kakeru You ni" (Japanese: 気は、輪をかけるように)	Taichi Ogawa	Michiko Yokote	January 12, 2023
3	"Winds of a Brewing Storm"; Transliteration: "Asa'arashi ga Fuku" (Japanese: 朝嵐が吹く)	Noriyuki Kitanohara	Michiko Yokote	January 19, 2023
4	"Broken Tempo"; Transliteration: "Hyōshi no Ōbanare" (Japanese: 拍子の大離れ)	Tatsuya Ishihara	Michiko Yokote	January 26, 2023
5	"Push and Pull"; Transliteration: "Oshite, Hiite" (Japanese: 押し手、引い手)	Eisaku Kawanami	Hiroyuki Yoshino	February 2, 2023
6	"Taking Shape"; Transliteration: "Himezori Naru" (Japanese: 姫反り成る)	Noriyuki Kitanohara	Hiroyuki Yoshino	February 9, 2023
7	"Unwavering Spirit"; Transliteration: "Matoiru Kokoro" (Japanese: 的射る心)	Minoru Ōta	Michiko Yokote	February 16, 2023
8	"Trajectory"; Transliteration: "Yasujimichi" (Japanese: 矢筋道)	Tatsuya Ishihara	Michiko Yokote	February 23, 2023
9	"Bending Will"; Transliteration: "Urazoru Ishi" (Japanese: 裏反る意志)	Mei Isai	Hiroyuki Yoshino	March 2, 2023
10	"Draw of a New Dawn"; Transliteration: "Katte na Yoake" (Japanese: 勝手な夜明け)	Eisaku Kawanami	Hiroyuki Yoshino	March 9, 2023
11	"Falling Into Place"; Transliteration: "Ikiau Basho" (Japanese: 息合う場所)	Minoru Ōta	Michiko Yokote	March 16, 2023
12	"The Linking Shot"; Transliteration: "Tsunagari no Issha" (Japanese: 繋がりの一射)	Takuya Yamamura	Michiko Yokote	March 23, 2023
13	"Resounding Release"; Transliteration: "Ki, Harau Meigen" (Japanese: 気、祓う鳴弦)	Eisaku Kawanami	Haruna Matsuda	March 30, 2023
