= Target panic =

Psychological condition linked to archery

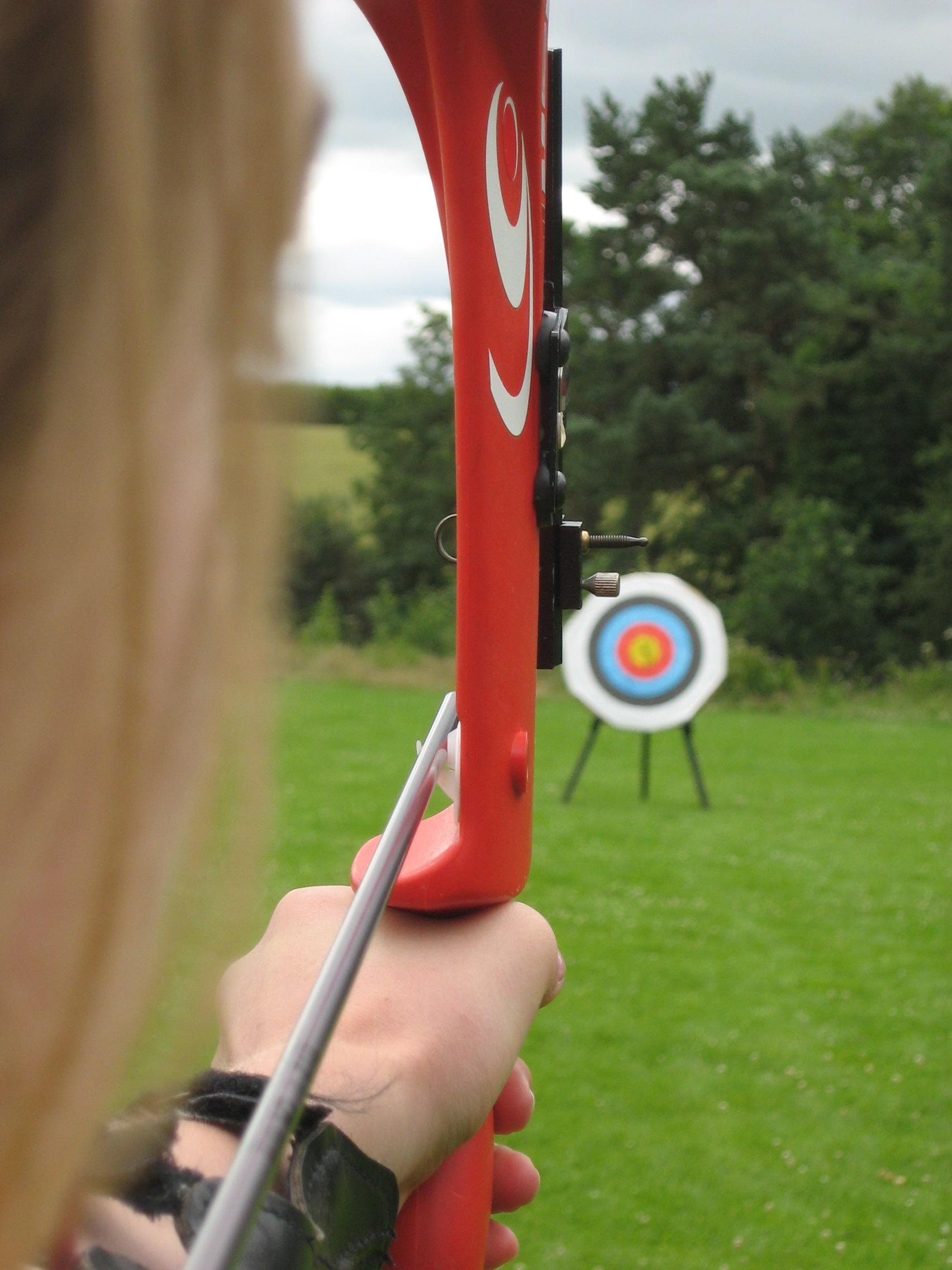
A person shooting a recurve bow at an archery target

Target panic is a psychological—and perhaps neurological—condition experienced by many archers, both competitive and recreational. The condition manifests in various ways, impacting an archer's ability to shoot confidently and accurately.

Target panic has been discussed in archery circles since at least the 1970s. It was originally called "gold panic" because an archer would experience symptoms (panic) when the arrow was brought onto the bullseye (gold circle). The name later evolved into target panic because it was discovered that the symptoms could be experienced when aiming at any target.

== Description ==
While target panic was originally blamed on high levels of anxiety and a "fear of failure", it is now understood to be caused by the way in which the brain learns at a neurological level. Treatments based on this new paradigm have been very effective at treating target panic in archers up to the Olympic level.

There are three primary symptoms of target panic. An archer suffering from target panic may experience a premature anchor, where the bow appears to become very heavy and it is difficult for the shooter to come to a full anchor position. A second symptom is referred to as a premature hold, where an archer "locks up" or "hits a wall" that they are unable to move past as they try to align their arrow with the target. The third symptom is referred to as a premature release and is characterized by an inability to come to full anchor without releasing the arrow.

== In media ==
Target panic is extensively explored in the light novel and subsequent anime series Tsurune about Japanese Kyūdō.

== See also ==
- Choke (sports)
- Dartitis
- Target fixation
- Yips
