= Ryōta Suzuki (voice actor) =

Japanese voice actor (born 1988)

- 鈴木 崚汰
- Born: December 22, 1998 (age 27); Nagoya, Aichi Prefecture, Japan
- Occupation: Voice actor
- Years active: 2016–present
- Agent: Dash On

Ryōta Suzuki (鈴木 崚汰, Suzuki Ryōta; born December 22, 1998) is a Japanese voice actor. He voiced Yū Ishigami in Kaguya-sama: Love Is War, Tōma Hiragi in Wind Breaker, and Heisuke Mashimo in Sakamoto Days.

== Filmography ==
=== TV anime ===
Year	Title	Role	Ref.
2017	King's Game The Animation	Teruaki Nagata	
2017	Children of the Whales	Jiki	
2017	Classroom of the Elite	Akito Miyake	
2017	Recovery of an MMO Junkie	Hayashi	
2017	Yu-Gi-Oh! VRAINS	Jin Kusanagi, Makoto Kimishima, Yoroizaka	
2018	Doreiku	Yūga Ohta	
2018	FLCL Alternative	Aida	
2018–19	Tsurune	Ryōhei Yamanouchi	
2019	Kaguya-sama: Love Is War	Yū Ishigami	
2019	Afterlost	Yūji	
2019	Why the Hell are You Here, Teacher!?	Ichirō Satō	
2020	number24	Seiichirō Jingyōji	
2020	Kaguya-sama: Love Is War?	Yū Ishigami	
2020	King's Raid: Successors of the Will	Rihito	
2020	Magatsu Wahrheit -Zuerst-	Klaus	
2020	Boruto: Naruto Next Generations	Arai	
2021	Bleach: Thousand-Year Blood War	Chōjirō Sasakibe (young)	
2021	Full Dive	Granada	
2021	Pretty Boy Detective Club	Yokuya Kinshiro	
2021	Fena: Pirate Princess	Yukimaru	
2021	Banished from the Hero's Party	Red	
2022	Police in a Pod	Seiji Minamoto	
2022	Sabikui Bisco	Bisco Akaboshi	
2022	Kaguya-sama: Love Is War – Ultra Romantic	Yū Ishigami	
2022	Dr. Stone: Ryusui	Ryusui Nanami	
2022	Classroom of the Elite 2nd Season	Akito Miyake	
2022	Shoot! Goal to the Future	Ryūji Amagai	
2022	Animation x Paralympic: Harigane Service	Ibuki Matsukata	
2022	The Human Crazy University	Takao Rukawa	
2022	Blue Lock	Junichi Wanima, Keisuke Wanima	
2023	My Hero Academia 6	Bruce Lee	
2023	Opus Colors	Mashu Kirinoe	
2023	Beyblade X	King Manju	
2024	Brave Bang Bravern!	Isami Ao	
2024	Banished from the Hero's Party 2nd Season	Red	
2024	Cherry Magic! Thirty Years of Virginity Can Make You a Wizard?!	Yūichi Kurosawa	
2024	The Unwanted Undead Adventurer	Rentt Faina	
2024	Wind Breaker	Tōma Hiragi	
2024	Himitsu no AiPri	Neppa Matsuoka	
2024	Failure Frame: I Became the Strongest and Annihilated Everything with Low-Level Spells	Tōka Mimori	
2024	The Elusive Samurai	Prince Moriyoshi	
2024	Tying the Knot with an Amagami Sister	Uryū Kamihate	
2024	Trillion Game	Sakura	
2024	Haigakura	Sanu	
2024	A Terrified Teacher at Ghoul School!	Mikoto Sano	
2024	Dragon Ball Daima	Yamcha	
2025	From Bureaucrat to Villainess: Dad's Been Reincarnated!	Auguste Lion	
2025	Sakamoto Days	Heisuke Mashimo	
2025	Übel Blatt	Rangzatz	
2025	Witch Watch	Morihito Otogi	
2025	Welcome to the Outcast's Restaurant!	Vigor	
2025	City the Animation	Todoroki	
2025	Alma-chan Wants to Be a Family!	Enji Kamisato	
2026	Dead Account	Naruhiko Emoto	
2026	In the Clear Moonlit Dusk	Kohaku Ichimura	
2026	Scum of the Brave	"Shinigami" Yashiro	
2026	Even a Replica Can Fall in Love	Shuya Sanada	
2026	Black Torch	Jiro Azuma	
2026	Jaadugar: A Witch in Mongolia	Tolui	
2026	Dragon Ball Super: Beerus	Yamcha	
2026	Dark Machine: The Animation	Ryō	
2027	Mashle: Magic & Muscles	Lévis Rosequartz	
2027	Happy Kanako's Killer Life	Sakurai	
2027	Phantom Busters	Kotaro Tamon	
TBA	Millennium Family	Hugo	

=== Anime films ===
Year	Title	Role	Ref.
2020	The Island of Giant Insects	Satoshi Oda	
2022	Tsurune: The Movie – The First Shot	Ryōhei Yamanouchi	
2022	Kaguya-sama: Love Is War – The First Kiss That Never Ends	Yū Ishigami	
2025	Whoever Steals This Book	Tanbi Che	

=== Video games ===
Year	Title	Role	Ref.
2016	MapleStory	Male Aran	
2018	WarioWare Gold	Young Cricket, Mike	
2019	Fate/Grand Order	Asclepius	
2019	Hero's Park	Takamizu Hayato	
2020	Disney: Twisted-Wonderland	Trey Clover	
2021	Alchemy Stars	White Dwarf	
2021	WarioWare Get It Together	Young Cricket, Mike	
2022	Another Eden	Dewey (Alter)	
2022	Path to Nowhere	Mr.Fox	
2023	Loop8: Summer of Gods	Saru	
2023	WarioWare Move It!	Young Cricket, Mike	
2024	Ensemble Stars!!	Nice Arneb Thunder	
2025	Kyoto Xanadu	Kazuki Nakiri	
2026	Dragon Ball: Sparking! Zero	Yamcha	

=== Live-action drama ===
Year	Title	Role	Ref.
2021	Kikai Sentai Zenkaiger	Cutanner Goldtsuiker/TwokaiCutanner (voice)	

=== Dubbing ===
==== Live action ====
- Space Jam: A New Legacy (2021), WB Executive (Steven Yeun)
- Those Who Wish Me Dead (2021), Patrick (Nicholas Hoult)
- Almost Never (2022), Harry (Harry Still)
- Gen V (2023), Andre Anderson (Chance Perdomo)
- Renfield (2023), R. M. Renfield (Nicholas Hoult)
- No Way Up (2024), Jed (Jeremias Amoore)
- Kraven the Hunter (2024), Young Sergei Kravinoff (Levi Miller)
- Squid Game (Season 2) (2024), Nam-gyu (Roh Jae-won)
- The Order (2024), Bob Mathews (Nicholas Hoult)
- I Know What You Did Last Summer (2025), Teddy Spencer (Tyriq Withers)
- Until Dawn (2026), Abe (Belmont Cameli)
- Masters of the Universe (2026), Adam Glenn / He-Man (Nicholas Galitzine)
- Backrooms (2026), Bobby (Finn Bennett)

==== Animation ====
- Rock Dog (2016), Bodi (Luke Wilson) (2018 Netflix Dub)
- Your Friendly Neighborhood Spider-Man (2025–present), Harry Osborn (Zeno Robinson)
