= Number24 =

Japanese anime television series

- Key visual
- Genre: Sports (rugby)
- Created by: Movic; Kei Mori
- Anime television series
- Directed by: Shigeru Kimiya
- Written by: Rika Nakase
- Music by: no_my
- Studio: PRA
- Licensed by: Crunchyroll
- Original network: Tokyo MX
- English network: US: Crunchyroll Channel
- Original run: January 8, 2020 – April 15, 2020
- Episodes: 12

Number24 is a Japanese anime television series produced by PRA and directed by Shigeru Kimiya. It aired on Tokyo MX from January to April 2020.

== Plot ==
Natsusa Yuzuki has been playing rugby as a left-winger ever since he was a child, and after enrolling in Doushisha University for college, he quickly becomes a rising star in the Kansai University League.

His dreams are shattered, when a nasty motorbike accident leaves him with a cervical herniated disk — making him unable to be able to play rugby ever again. Unwilling to let go of the sport completely and with no role available other than the position of the university team manager, he accepts his new post and hopes to help his squad obtain a league title.

Natsusa's team is an unlikely bunch, including but not limited to his stoic best friend and full-back Seiichirou Shingyouji, whose reliability and consistency Natsusa depends on; hot-headed first-year Yasunari Tsuru, who harbors a strong dislike for Natsusa, filling his senior's old position as back left wing; and Yuu Mashiro, who is struggling to hold his ground as a scrum half.

In addition, a year ago, Ibuki Ueoka, the genius stand-off that was once Doushisha's ace, suddenly quit rugby — and now Natsusa is determined to get him back.

With the goal of strengthening the team he once belonged to as a player, Natsusa sets out to help Doushisha reach rugby nationals.

== Characters ==
=== Doushisha University ===
Natsusa Yuzuki (柚木 夏紗, Yuzuki Natsusa)
Voiced by: Kengo Kawanishi (Japanese); Griffin Puatu (English)
Seiichirou Shingyouji (真行寺 清一郎, Shingyōji Seiichirō)
Voiced by: Ryōta Suzuki (Japanese); Johnny Yong Bosch (English)
Ibuki Ueoka (上丘 伊吹, Ueoka Ibuki)
Voiced by: Junichi Yanagita (Japanese); Chris Hackney (English)
Yasunari Tsuru (都留 靖也, Tsuru Yasunari)
Voiced by: Shōhei Komatsu (Japanese); Michael Schneider (English)
Yuu Mashiro (真白 優, Mashiro Yū)
Voiced by: Ayumu Murase (Japanese); Aleks Le (English)
Gakuto Zaitsu (内梨 大成, Zaitsu Gakuto)
Voiced by: Hinata Tadokoro (Japanese); Bill Butts (English)
Ikuto Yufu (由布 郁斗, Yufu Ikuto)
Voiced by: Shinnosuke Tachibana (Japanese); Martin Fraser (English)
Taisei Uchinashi (内梨 大成, Uchinashi Taisei)
Voiced by: Makoto Furukawa (Japanese); James Weaver Clark (English)
Ethan Taylor
Voiced by: Kazuyuki Okitsu (Japanese); Ian Sinclair (English)

=== Koufuuin University ===
Madoka Hongou (本郷 円, Hongō Madoka)
Voiced by: Soma Saito (Japanese); Barrett Leddy (English)
Kazutaka Hongou (本郷 主鷹, Hongō Kazutaka)
Voiced by: Kaito Ishikawa (Japanese); Daniel J. Edwards (English)

== Production and release ==
The series was first announced by Movic in March 2019. The series was produced by PRA and directed by Shigeru Kimiya, with Rika Nakase writing the scripts and Saori Sakaguchi designing the characters. Takatoshi Hamano served as the series' sound director. The series premiered on Tokyo MX on January 8, 2020. Masanori Kobayashi performed the opening theme song, "Set!". The series has three ending themes, "Kimi to Iru nara", "Comical Try!!", and "Every Fight". They were performed by Natsusa Yuzuki (Kengo Kawanishi) and Seiichirou Shingyouji (Ryōta Suzuki), Yuzuki (Kawanishi) and Ibuki Ueoka (Junichi Yanagita), and Yuzuki (Kawanishi) and Yasunari Tsuru (Shōhei Komatsu) respectively. Episodes 11 and 12 were originally intended to be broadcast on March 18 and March 25, 2020. However, due to the COVID-19 pandemic, they were delayed to April 8 and April 15, 2020, respectively.

Internationally, the series was licensed by Funimation outside of Asia.

== Reception ==
Caitlin Moore from Anime Feminist praised the plot and characters, while criticizing the animation and character designs. Rebecca Silverman from Anime News Network praised the series for the main trio's story and the theme music, while criticizing the large amounts of characters and plot points present in the series. She also felt there were some body issues in the art.
