= Zona Cesarini =

Zona Cesarini (English: Cesarini zone) is an Italian expression used when talking about events or situations that happened, are happening or will happen at the last minute and when something is at its final stages.

The expression is named after Italian footballer Renato Cesarini, who was known for scoring goals during the last few minutes of games.

== See also ==
- Closer (baseball)
- Clutch (sports)
- Fergie Time
