= Dartitis =

Motor condition that affects darts players

Dartitis (/dɑːrˈtaɪtɪs/) is a condition that can affect darts players and severely damage their performance. The term is used in reference to players who struggle with some kind of motor skills or psychological problem affecting their ability to release their darts. It has been compared to 'the yips', an expression used to describe the sudden inability to execute basic functions while playing sports without any explanation.

Some players who experienced dartitis, such as five-time world champion Eric Bristow, have failed to recover the level of performance they once had prior to developing the condition.

== Etymology ==
Dartitis is a portmanteau of the sport's name and "-itis", a suffix that relates to a medical condition. The word was first used in the magazine Darts World by editor Robbie Dyson in 1981.

== Condition ==
Dartitis is described by the Collins English Dictionary as "(in darts) nervous twitching or tension that destroys the concentration and spoils performance". It is believed to be a form of dystonia, which is described by the UK NHS as:

A medical term for a range of movement disorders that cause muscle spasms and contractions. The spasms and contractions may either be sustained or may come and go. Movements are often repetitive and cause unusual, awkward and sometimes painful postures. Tremor (shaking) can also be a characteristic of some types of dystonia. Dystonia is thought to be a neurological condition (caused by underlying problems with the brain and nervous system). However, in most cases, brain functions such as intelligence, memory and language remain unaffected.

== Notable cases ==
=== Eric Bristow ===
In the late 1980s, five-time world champion Eric Bristow began experiencing dartitis. At the 1987 Swedish Open, he found himself unable to let go of his dart properly. Although he still reached further world finals and even managed to regain the number one position in the world rankings in 1990, his career largely declined as a result. It was around this time he started mentoring future 16-time world champion Phil Taylor, with whom he practiced as a way of treating his condition.

=== Berry van Peer ===
At the 2017 Grand Slam of Darts, then-21-year-old Dutch player Berry van Peer struggled greatly with dartitis. After winning his opening group stage match against Simon Whitlock, Van Peer found it increasingly difficult to let go of his darts in his second match against Gary Anderson, attempting to throw several times before finally releasing and throwing the subsequent darts. This resulted in a 5–1 loss where he recorded a three-dart average of only 68.8. Despite his issues and calls from tournament organisers to withdraw from the event, a tearful Van Peer defeated Cameron Menzies 5–4 in his final group match and qualified for the knockout stages.

=== Nathan Aspinall ===
Nathan Aspinall started noticing his dartitis on night 11 of the 2023 Premier League, where he lost his first-round match 6–5 to Peter Wright. Aspinall recounted the experience during the Sky Sports documentary Game of Throws: "I lost the game 6–5, I went upstairs after the game and I was in the toilet and I was absolutely smashing ten lumps of shit out of the hand dryer. I lost my head." He typically pauses before throwing or ends up abandoning his throw altogether to allow himself to regroup.

=== Mark Webster ===
2008 BDO World Darts Championship winner Mark Webster experienced a downturn in form in 2014 while dealing with dartitis, struggling to qualify for major tournaments. He later transitioned into work as a pundit and commentator, admitting in a 2024 episode of the Darts Show podcast that he never recovered the confidence to play.

=== Beau Greaves ===
Beau Greaves, who won her first Women's World Championship in 2022, struggled with dartitis for a year. She told Sky Sports that she experienced anxiety about missing the dartboard, exacerbated by the pressure of playing in front of a crowd. She claimed that her father and brother also dealt with the condition.

=== Kevin Painter ===
Kevin Painter first felt the effects of dartitis at age 40, but his struggles with the condition became more prominent in 2024 when his darts became unable to leave his hand. He began sessions of hypnotherapy to treat the problem, which appeared to work, until his dartitis returned during a televised World Seniors match. Painter describe the condition as "demoralising" and a "real mental struggle."
