= Stage fright =

Phobia

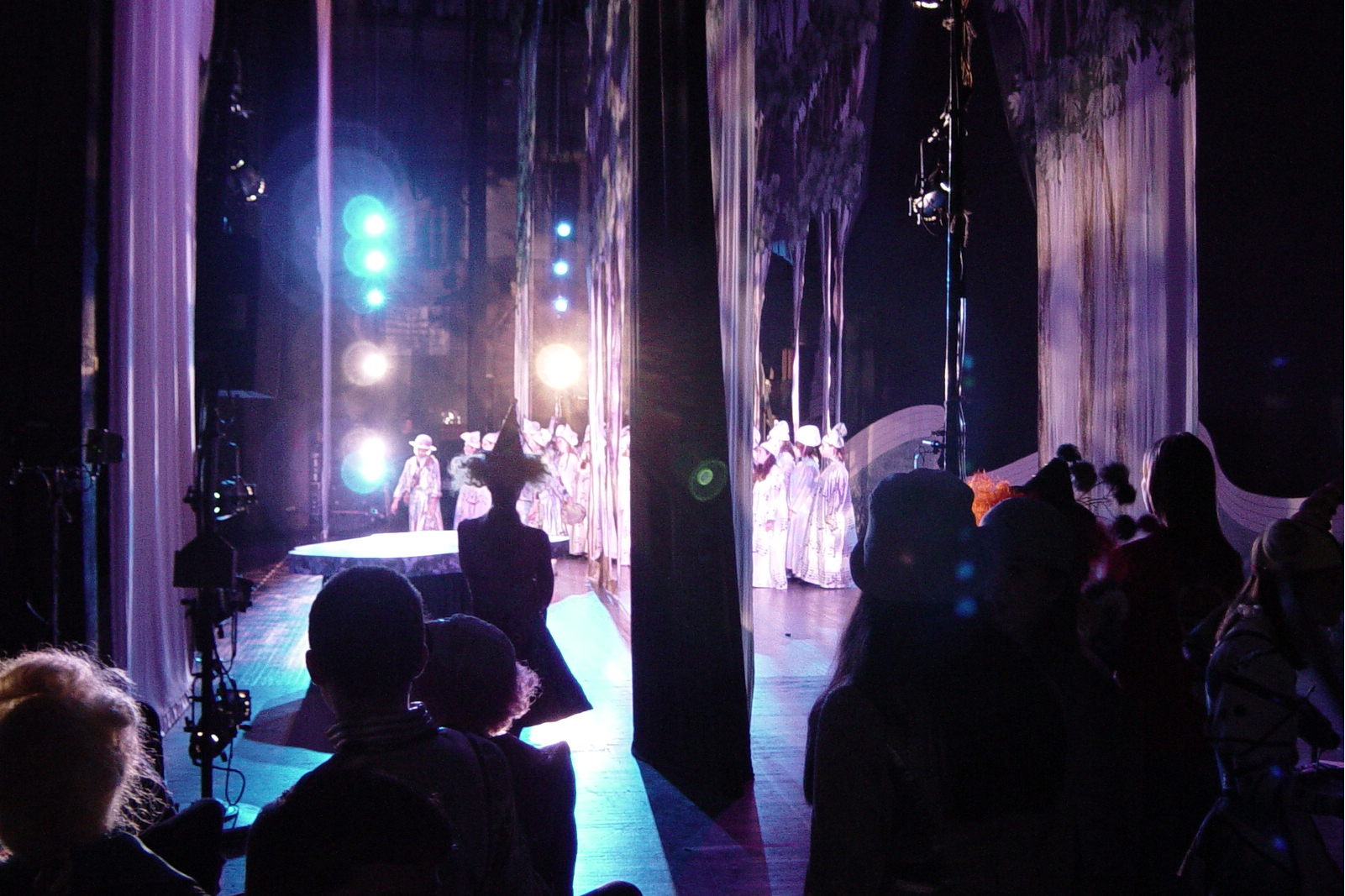
View of a performance on stage from the wings

Stage fright or performance anxiety is the anxiety, fear, or persistent phobia that may be aroused in an individual by the requirement to perform in front of an audience, real or imagined, whether actually or potentially (for example, when performing before a camera). Performing in front of an unknown audience can cause significantly more anxiety than performing in front of familiar faces. Conversely, some performers report minimal anxiety when appearing before strangers, but severe stage fright when friends, family, and colleagues are present. This condition can manifest up to 36 hours beforehand, with classic symptoms such as nausea, dry mouth, and eye twitches.

In some cases, stage fright may be a part of a larger pattern of social phobia (social anxiety disorder), but many people experience stage fright without any wider problems. Quite often, stage fright arises from the mere anticipation of a performance, often long before it happens. It has numerous manifestations: stuttering, tachycardia, tremor in the hands and legs, sweaty hands, facial nerve tics, dry mouth, and dizziness.

== People and situations ==
Stage fright can occur in people of all experience levels, from those who are completely new to being in front of an audience to those who have done so for years. It is commonly recognized in the population. Stage fright may, for example, have a negative impact on the individual's performance, such that it affects their confidence during job interviews, presentations, etc. It also affects athletes, teachers, actors, comedians, musicians, and politicians. Many people with no other problems in communication can experience stage fright, but some people with chronic stage fright also have social anxiety or social phobia, in which chronic feelings of high anxiety in any social situation are not uncommon. Stage fright can also be seen in school situations, like stand-up projects and class speeches.

== Effects ==
When someone starts to feel the sensation of being scared or nervous, they start to experience anxiety. According to a Harvard Mental Health Letter, "Anxiety usually has physical symptoms that may include a racing heart, a dry mouth, a shaky voice, blushing, trembling, sweating, lightheadedness, and nausea". It triggers the body to activate its sympathetic nervous system. This process takes place when the body releases adrenaline into the bloodstream, causing a chain of reactions to occur. This bodily response is known as the "fight or flight" syndrome, a naturally occurring process in the body done to protect itself from harm. "The neck muscles contract, bringing the head down and shoulders up, while the back muscles draw the spine into a concave curve. This, in turn, pushes the pelvis forward and pulls the genitals up, slumping the body into a classic fetal position". This is also noted to have effects on sexual performance and physiology, which can sometimes be attributed to psychological barriers.

In trying to resist this position, the body will begin to shake in places such as the legs and hands. Several other things happen besides this. Muscles in the body contract, causing them to be tense and ready to attack. Second, "blood vessels in the extremities constrict". This can leave a person with the feeling of cold fingers, toes, nose, and ears. Constricted blood vessels also give the body extra blood flow to the vital organs.

Negative emotionality accounted for more than 50% of individual variations in performance anxiety in musicians, according to research on performance anxiety and the roles of personality and experience in musicians. Additionally, a discussion revealed that many years of formal education might counteract the performance anxiety linked to personality type. Given various conditions, performance anxiety reduced with time, indicating that the diary style of self-monitoring may have therapeutic benefits.

== Treatment ==
One of the most notable examples in the treatment of stage fright involves the use of beta blockers. Propranolol is occasionally prescribed off-label to treat performance anxiety. As a beta blocker drug, propranolol prevents adrenaline (epinephrine) released during the "fight-or-flight" bodily response from attaching to the heart, lungs, and other parts of the body. This reduces or eliminates the physical symptoms of performance anxiety, including increased heart rate (tachycardia), rapid breathing (hyperventilation), dry mouth, trembling, shaky voice, and sweating. Propranolol is not an officially approved treatment for performance anxiety; however, past studies and patient experiences indicate the drug is often very effective at reducing physical symptoms of anxiety. Propranolol does not help with the mental symptoms of anxiety, including the emotional feeling of nervousness, since the drug does not alter the neurochemistry of the brain, unlike typical medications prescribed for other forms of anxiety, such as antidepressants.

There are also ways to treat performance anxiety without the use of medication. Relaxing the body with deep breaths, mentally preparing oneself, and redirecting one's attention are techniques that may help with minimizing stage fright. Although it is a common assumption that alcohol can be used to relieve anxiety, other forms of treatment prove to be much better at treating stage fright. Alcohol consumption may actually affect one's performance and lead to lapses in memory and overall absent-mindedness.

== Notable people ==
Many performers have been afflicted by stage fright and have spoken about it, revealing how they got over it publicly, including Carly Simon, Roy Orbison and Barbra Streisand.

Hugh Grant said that when starring in the 2007 film Music and Lyrics that he "did the whole film full of lorazepam." However, not every performer suffers from stage fright. Ethel Merman said: "What’s there to worry about? I know my lines. …Why should I be nervous on opening night? The people who paid for tickets for a new play, they’re the ones who should be nervous."

== See also ==
- Camera shyness – Desire to avoid being photographed or filmed
- Choke (sports) – Sports term
- Counterphobic attitude – Seeking out the source of one's fear to overcome it
- Glossophobia – Fear of public speaking
- Scopophobia – Fear of being stared at
- Test anxiety – Anxiety or stress triggered by exams
- White coat syndrome
