= List of A3! episodes =

A3! is an anime adaptation that was announced in February 2019, with Keisuke Shinohara directing, and Masayuki Sakoi acting as series director, featuring Naoki Hayashi writing the scripts. Masaru Yokoyama and Kana Hashiguchi are composing the music. The series is animated by P.A. Works and Studio 3Hz. The anime adaptation is split into two parts, with A3! Season Spring & Summer planned to air from January to March 2020 and A3! Season Autumn & Winter from July to September 2020. Funimation acquired distribution rights to the series outside of Asia, and streamed the show as it aired in Japan. Muse Communication also acquired the distribution rights for the series in Southeast Asia and South Asia, and is streaming it on their Muse Asia YouTube channel and iQIYI.

A3! Season Spring & Summer began on January 14, 2020, and the theme song for the series is "Act! Addict! Actors!" Episode 4 was initially announced to have been delayed "due to production issues" and then subsequently for another two weeks, before the official anime production announced that the entire series would be rebroadcast from the beginning on April 6, 2020, and aired until June 22, 2020. A3! Season Autumn & Winter was delayed to air from October 13 to December 29, 2020, due to the effects of the COVID-19 pandemic. Masayuki Sakoi took over full directing responsibilities for A3! Season Autumn & Winter, and Nozomi Nagatomo took over character designing from Mariko Komatsu. Kōhei Honda also replaced Hiroko Tanabe as art director.

== Episodes ==
No.	Title (Note: All English titles are taken from Funimation.)	Directed by	Written by	Original release date
Part I (Spring & Summer)
1	"To a Future in Full Bloom"; Transliteration: "Mankai no Mirai e" (Japanese: 満開の未来へ)	Emi Yamashita	Naoki Hayashi	January 14, 2020
2	"Romeo and Julius"; Transliteration: "Romio to Juriasu" (Japanese: ロミオとジュリアス)	Harume Kosaka	Naoki Hayashi	January 21, 2020
3	"Good Night, Theater"; Transliteration: "Oyasumi Shiatā" (Japanese: おやすみシアター)	Daisuke Tsukushi	Naoki Hayashi	January 28, 2020
4	"A New Challenge"; Transliteration: "Arata na Chōsen" (Japanese: 新たな挑戦)	Kenshirō Okada	Naoki Hayashi	April 28, 2020
5	"On Love - Spring Edition"; Transliteration: "Koi ni Tsuite Haru" (Japanese: 恋について・春)	Yūji Tokuno	Naoki Hayashi	May 5, 2020
6	"The Show Must Go On!"	Makoto Nakazono	Naoki Hayashi	May 12, 2020
7	"A New Season"; Transliteration: "Atarashii Kisetsu" (Japanese: 新しい季節)	Nao Miyoshi	Naoki Hayashi	May 19, 2020
8	"The Thousand and One Nights"; Transliteration: "Senya Ichiya Monogatari" (Japanese: 千夜一夜物語)	Chie Yamashiro	Kurasumi Sunayama	May 26, 2020
9	"Summer Camp"; Transliteration: "Hajimari no Natsu Gasshuku" (Japanese: はじまりの夏合宿)	Hitomi Efuku	Naoki Hayashi	June 2, 2020
10	"True Friends"; Transliteration: "Hontō no Otomodachi" (Japanese: 本当のオトモダチ)	Masaki Utsunomiya	Kurasumi Sunayama	June 9, 2020
11	"My Weakness"; Transliteration: "Ore no Yowasa o" (Japanese: オレの弱さを)	Harume Kosaka	Naoki Hayashi	June 16, 2020
12	"Summertime Survival!"; Transliteration: "Kokufuku no Summer!" (Japanese: 克服のSUMMER！)	Aya Okada	Naoki Hayashi	June 23, 2020
Part II (Autumn & Winter)
13	"Autumn Turmoil"; Transliteration: "Haran no Aki" (Japanese: 波乱の秋)	Daisuke Tsukushi	Naoki Hayashi	October 13, 2020
14	"A Mismatched Buddy Pair"; Transliteration: "Fuzoroi na Badi" (Japanese: ふぞろいなバディ)	Shintaro Itoga	Kurasumi Sunayama	October 20, 2020
15	"One-Man Shows"; Transliteration: "Hitori-shibai" (Japanese: 一人芝居)	Harume Kosaka	Kurasumi Sunayama	October 27, 2020
16	"Become Someone Different"; Transliteration: "Chigau Dareka ni" (Japanese: 違う誰かに)	Nao Miyoshi	Naoki Hayashi	November 3, 2020
17	"A Confession"; Transliteration: "Kokuhaku" (Japanese: 告白)	Shigeki Awai	Naoki Hayashi	November 10, 2020
18	"Portrait of A Punk"; Transliteration: "Baddo Bōi Pōtoreito" (Japanese: バッドボーイ・ポートレイト)	Yūichi Nakazawa	Naoki Hayashi	November 17, 2020
19	"Season of Reunion"; Transliteration: "Saikai no Kisetsu" (Japanese: 再会の季節)	Natsumi Higashida	Naoki Hayashi	November 24, 2020
20	"An Act-Off"; Transliteration: "Taiman Act" (Japanese: タイマンACT)	Hitomi Efuku	Kurasumi Sunayama	December 1, 2020
21	"Responsibility and Commitment"; Transliteration: "Sekinin to Kakugo" (Japanese: 責任と覚悟)	Yoshitaka Koyama	Kurasumi Sunayama	December 8, 2020
22	"Discord"; Transliteration: "Fukyōwaon" (Japanese: 不協和音)	Nao Miyoshi; Takahiro Tamano	Naoki Hayashi	December 15, 2020
23	"Stand by Me"; Transliteration: "Tonari ni Tatteitai Omae de" (Japanese: 隣に立っていたいお前で)	Shigeki Awai	Naoki Hayashi	December 22, 2020
24	"Once More, with Feeling"; Transliteration: "Mō Ichido, Koko Kara" (Japanese: もう一度、ここから)	Harume Kosaka	Naoki Hayashi	December 29, 2020
