= List of Flip Flappers episodes =

Volume 6 Blu-ray/DVD cover for Flip Flappers, depicting Papika (left) and Cocona (right)

Flip Flappers is a 13-episode anime television series. It was produced by Studio 3Hz under the direction of Kiyotaka Oshiyama.

The series aired in Japan from October to December 2016. It is licensed in North America by Sentai Filmworks and was simulcast by Hulu, Crunchyroll, and the Anime Network. The opening theme is "Serendipity" by ZAQ, while the ending theme is "Flip Flap Flip Flap" by To-Mas feat. Chima. The anime was released across six Blu-ray & DVD volumes. MVM Films released the series in the United Kingdom.

== Episodes ==
No.	Title	Directed by	Written by	Original release date
1	"Pure Input"; Transliteration: "Pyua Inputto" (Japanese: ピュアインプット)	Kiyotaka Oshiyama	Yuniko Ayana	October 6, 2016
Cocona, an ordinary schoolgirl who lives with her grandmother and uncertain about her future career, meets a peculiar girl named Papika. Along with a robot named TT-392, the two girls fall into a tunnel and wind up in a snow-laden world known as Pure Illusion. Just as Papika informs Cocona that she is searching for a treasure somewhere in Pure Illusion, the girls suddenly come up against giant snow-covered beasts, with Cocona losing her glasses in the process. As Papika falls into an ocean while trying to get the glasses back, Cocona suddenly awakens a power inside of her and rescues Papika. Afterwards, the two manage to return to the real world, with Cocona now in possession of a blue amorphous fragment, before the two girls are suddenly captured.
2	"Pure Converter"; Transliteration: "Pyua Konbāta" (Japanese: ピュアコンバータ)	Noriyuki Nomata	Yuniko Ayana	October 13, 2016
Having managed to escape from whoever captured her, Papika, who is unable to go through the tunnel again without Cocona, transfers into her school, much to the annoyance of Yayaka, Cocona's childhood friend. On top of dealing with Papika, Cocona also has to deal with her pet rabbit, Uexküll, coming to school with her. Upon following Uexküll after he gets sucked up by a strange device under a statue, Cocona and Papika end up in yet another Pure Illusion, where they happen to grow rabbit ears and tails and start to develop a desire to nibble things. While retrieving another amorphous fragment, Papika inadvertently activates a giant device with Cocona and an anthropomorphic Uexküll, known as the Green Knight, caged inside of it. Just as Cocona and the Green Knight are about to be dipped in lava, Papika awakens her own power and rescues them, helping them escape back to the real world. Afterwards, Papika takes Cocona to her organization called FlipFlap, where the leader, Salt, sends them to another Pure Illusion.
3	"Pure XLR"; Transliteration: "Pyua Ekusu-eru-āru" (Japanese: ピュアXLR)	Hiroshi Ikehata	Yuniko Ayana	October 20, 2016
Papika ends up in a desert wasteland separated from Cocona, where she is rescued by some villagers who are under tyranny by an evil gang. As Papika stands up to the gang members, she is confronted by the gang's leader, who is revealed to be Cocona under the control of a mask. After Papika gets knocked out after freeing Cocona from the mask's control, a young villager reveals herself to be the evil villain Welwitschia, who put the mask on Cocona. However, Papika manages to regain her strength after eating a sweet potato and rescues Cocona. Then, Cocona and Papika use their amorphous fragments to transform themselves into magical girls named Pure Blade and Pure Barrier, combining their powers to defeat Welwitschia after she transforms into a monstrous form. Just as Welwitschia launches a surprise attack, she is destroyed by the arrival of Yayaka who, along with her two cohorts Toto and Yuyu, escapes with the amorphous fragment that Welwitschia left behind.
4	"Pure Equalization"; Transliteration: "Pyua Ikoraizēshon" (Japanese: ピュアイコライゼーション)	Masayuki Sakoi	Ayumi Sekine	October 27, 2016
Stating that their transformations are dependent on them syncing together their impedance levels, otherwise known as feelings, Hidaka, a scientist at FlipFlap, suggests that Cocona and Papika should spend some time living together. The next day at school, the girls come across Yayaka, who briefly hints that her organization called Asclepius, ruled by the High Priest, is allegedly gathering the amorphous fragments for the sake of world conquest. After school, the girls begin their mutual living lifestyle, staying at the tunnel from earlier which Papika had decorated. The next day, the girls visit a deserted island for some food, only to wind up becoming stranded after Papika's hoverboard gets washed away. While making the most of the situation, Cocona explains how she always wanted to meet her parents, who died around the time of her birth. With their feelings synced by the experience, Cocona and Papika set off together towards another Pure Illusion.
5	"Pure Echo"; Transliteration: "Pyua Ekō" (Japanese: ピュアエコー)	Ryōhei Takeshita	Yuniko Ayana	November 3, 2016
Cocona and Papika arrive in Pure Illusion, this time set in a gloomy version of their school, where they briefly spot Yayaka before she disappears somewhere. The girls soon come across some spooky looking schoolgirls, who dress them up in their uniform and have them join in their school activities. As the girls find themselves doing the same activities everyday while getting oddly close with each other, Yayaka informs Cocona that they are stuck in a constant loop. Realizing that they must escape before the clock strikes only eleven times at midnight and time loops again, Cocona and Papika discover a hidden exit and follow Yayaka's group to a suspicious clock tower. Cocona and Yayaka get ensnared by numerous mysterious limbs, but Papika manages to transform and save them, allowing Cocona to transform, stop the loop and retrieve an amorphous fragment before Yayaka helps them escape to the real world.
6	"Pure Play"; Transliteration: "Pyua Purei" (Japanese: ピュアプレイ)	Hiroshi Ikehata	Yuniko Ayana	November 10, 2016
Cocona and Papika end up going through a strange gate, following another encounter with Yayaka in a Pure Illusion. During this time, they enter an alternate world, in which they are both parts of a girl named Iro. As Cocona experiences being an Iro beloved by her grandmother named Yuki, Papika experiences being an Iro who is abused by her parents, the two of which would occasionally switch places. As the two look more into this world, Iro falls into despair after Yuki loses her memories of her due to having Alzheimer's disease, leading the two Iros to realize they are one and the same. Finding hope in a bottle of nail polish left behind by Yuki, Iro is able to get Yuki to recognize her. Realizing that Iro was actually their upperclassman from the Art Club, Iroha Irodori, the girls find her wearing the nail polish that Yuki gave her.
7	"Pure Component"; Transliteration: "Pyua Konpōnento" (Japanese: ピュアコンポーネント)	Hitomi Ezoe	Kiyotaka Oshiyama	November 17, 2016
Cocona and Papika notice that Iroha has been acting differently, throwing away all of her old paintings and spending more time with others, which Hidaka suspects is a ripple effect caused by what they did while in the gate. As Cocona becomes hesitant about going to Pure Illusion again out of fear of changing reality further, she ends up in a Pure Illusion identical to her own world, where she encounters several versions of Papika, each with different personalities ranging from a little sister to a promiscuous lady. Despite spending time with the various Papikas, Cocona ultimately decides that she prefers the original Papika, who manages to find Cocona before she is sucked into a black hole. After returning with Cocona to the real world, Papika's amorphous fragment glows, showing her a vision of a woman named Mimi.
8	"Pure Breaker"; Transliteration: "Pyua Burēka" (Japanese: ピュアブレーカ)	Shun Enokido	Naoki Hayashi	November 24, 2016
While at the school swimming pool, Cocona and Papika end up in another Pure Illusion resembling a futuristic city. After being saved from mutant birds by Yayaka's group, the girls come across a short scientist named OO-303, who they nickname "Pops" (or "Mister"), before a giant humanoid robot containing an amorphous fragment appears. As OO-303 states his determination to protect his city, he gives Cocona and Papika some battle vehicles, which combine into a giant robot known as PapinaKing. When even this does not seem to be enough, Yayaka reluctantly steps in with her own robot, Yapico Boy, which combines with PapinaKing to become Great Pacoya, giving them the strength to defeat the monster. After returning with the amorphous fragment, which Yayaka relinquishes to the confusion of Toto and Yuyu, Cocona is taken aback when Papika suddenly calls her "Mimi".
9	"Pure Mute"; Transliteration: "Pyua Myūto" (Japanese: ピュアミュート)	Katsuhiko Kitada	Naoki Hayashi	December 1, 2016
Threatened with being replaced in Asclepius, Yayaka is given one more chance to steal all of Cocona and Papika's amorphous fragments. Meanwhile, Cocona has a falling out with Papika, as Papika keeps presumably confusing Cocona for someone else. As this feud carries over into the next Pure Illusion, resembling a white area, Cocona gets caught in a defense trap designed as a locked room alongside Toto and Yuyu, who declare a ceasefire until they can find a way to escape. Observing Papika and Yayaka fighting outside, Cocona, whose wavering emotions start to effect the trap, recalls how she first became friends with Yayaka in a hospital during childhood. As Yayaka attacks Papika when the latter tries to rescue Cococa, it is Cocona who manages to break free from the trap, only to be thrust into a confrontation against Yayaka. However, Yayaka manages to beat Cocona, yet unable to bring herself to remove the amorphous fragment in Cocona's thigh, leading Toto and Yuyu to turn against her. As Yayaka is brought back to FlipFlap for medical attention, Papika starts asking about Mimi, who she reveals to be her old partner.
10	"Pure Jitter"; Transliteration: "Pyua Jittā" (Japanese: ピュアジッター)	Emi Yamashita	Naoki Hayashi	December 8, 2016
Papika has regained her memories, but is hesitant to tell Cocona about Mimi. Later, Yayaka explains to Cocona that the power to rule over Pure Illusion will be granted to whoever gathers all of the amorphous fragments. Just then, the FlipFlap base comes under attack by Toto and Yuyu, who state that Yayaka only befriended Cocona to keep an eye on the amorphous fragment in her thigh. As Yayaka holds off Toto and Yuyu long enough for Cocona to escape with Papika, Cocona stops Papika to tell her about Mimi, who had been showing up in her dreams. Long ago, when she was known as Papikana, Papika was brought to a mysterious organization, where she befriended Mimi and met a young Salt. As Salt got permission for Papika to show Mimi a lake for the first time, the girls ended up becoming partners who could travel to Pure Illusion. Believing that she is being treated as a substitute for Mimi, Cocona runs off back home, only to discover that her grandmother is actually an Asclepius robot. Before Cocona can be captured, the amorphous fragments suddenly gather towards her, leading Cocona to become possessed by Mimi, revealed to be her mother.
11	"Pure Storage"; Transliteration: "Pyua Sutorēji" (Japanese: ピュアストレージ)	Keisuke Shinohara	Naoki Hayashi	December 15, 2016
Mimi, having taken control of Cocona's body, uses her ability to manipulate nature to overthrow the High Priest and take over Asclepius, deciding that Pure Illusion is a world for Cocona alone. Meanwhile, Yayaka arrives to protect Hidaka and Sayuri from the third amorphous child, Nyunyu. As Salt confronts Mimi, he recalls how his father learned of how Pure Illusion could affect the real world following an experiment that drove him crazy. After Mimi gave birth to Cocona, who is also revealed to be Salt's daughter, their organization attempted to separate them during an escape attempt. Just then, another personality sprung up inside of Mimi, taking control of her and unleashing tentacle powers. Before she could escape with Cocona, she was thwarted by Papika, leading Mimi to become the amorphous fragments. Back in the present, Papika appears before this "Mimi", who subdues Salt and escapes with Cocona's body. Meanwhile, Cocona finds herself in Pure Illusion, set in a canoe down a river, where Mimi tries to sway her to stay forever. As Pure Illusion starts to affect the real world, Salt gives an amorphous fragment to Yayaka, who encourages Papika to come with her to Pure Illusion to save Cocona.
12	"Pure Howling"; Transliteration: "Pyua Hauringu" (Japanese: ピュアハウリング)	Yasushi Muroya; Yoshimichi Kameda	Naoki Hayashi	December 22, 2016
Feeling a sense of familiarity of where they have arrived, Papika leads Yayaka to where Cocona is, only to be confronted by Mimi, who forces them to go through all the Pure Illusion worlds they faced before. As Yayaka struggles against fighting Welwitschia, Yayaka uses her desire to be friends with Cocona with an amorphous fragment in order to perform her own transformation. Meanwhile, as Hidaka stays behind to remotely give TT-392 an upgrade, Salt, Sayuri and Nyunyu head for the Asceplius base, where Yuyu is treating Toto's injuries. Mimi sends the giant humanoid robot to fight Yayaka while using her own powers to rewrite Papika's memories. However, Cocona is encouraged by her true mother to make her own decisions, helping Papika to remember that what Mimi truly wished for was for Cocona to have her own freedom. Managing to reunite and obtain a new transformation, Cocona and Papika prepare to fight against Mimi.
13	"Pure Audio"; Transliteration: "Pyua Ōdio" (Japanese: ピュアオーディオ)	Kiyotaka Oshiyama	Naoki Hayashi	December 29, 2016
It is revealed that at the time of Mimi's disappearance, Papika had reverted to a younger age and became friends with a young Cocona. Using their new transformations, Cocona and Papika go up against the dark Mimi, who sends regenerating monsters after them. Just then, Salt uses his father's equipment to enter Pure Illusion, where he reunites with the real Mimi. Determined to destroy everything and start anew, the dark Mimi undergoes her own transformation to unleash her full power, but is stopped by Cocona and Papika after they realize their love for each other. As Pure Illusion starts to close up, Papika sends Cocona back with Yayaka, then decides to stay and help Mimi. Afterwards, Cocona is shocked to learn that there is apparently no way to get back to Pure Illusion, only to find she is actually still in a Pure Illusion after deciding to go and save Papika herself. Reuniting once again at the tunnel, Cocona and Papika return home together.
