= A3! discography =

- Studio albums: 1
- EPs: 16
- Soundtrack albums: 2
- Singles: 5
- Musical theater: 6

A3! is a mobile game franchise produced by Liber Entertainment centered on actors from the fictional talent agency Mankai Company. Music for the series is published by Pony Canyon. Since the series' premiere, the show has released 1 studio album, 16 extended plays, 2 soundtrack albums, and 6 musical theater albums. In addition, 5 singles (4 A-side and 1 character) were released for the series.

Several sub-units formed in the franchise include A3ders! and BRBRookies! A3ders! consists of Sakuya Sakuma (voiced by Kōdai Sakai), Tenma Sumeragi (voiced by Takuya Eguchi), Banri Settsu (voiced by Chiharu Sawashiro), and Tsumugi Tsukioka (voiced by Atsushi Tamaru). BRBRookies consists of Chikage Utsuki (voiced by Wataru Hatano), Kumon Hyodo (voiced by Tasuku Hatanaka), Azami Izumida (voiced by Seiya Konishi), and Guy (voiced by Satoshi Hino).

== Albums ==
=== Studio albums ===
List of albums, with selected chart positions, sales figures and certifications
Title	Year	Album details	Peak chart positions		Sales	Certifications
Title	Year	Album details	JPN Oricon	JPN Hot	Sales	Certifications
A3! Mix Seasons LP	2019	Released: December 18, 2019; Label: Pony Canyon; Formats: CD, digital download	9	11	JPN: 11,046	—N/a
"—" denotes releases that did not chart or were not released in that region.

=== Extended plays ===
List of albums, with selected chart positions, sales figures and certifications
Title	Year	Album details	Peak chart positions		Sales	Certifications
Title	Year	Album details	JPN Oricon	JPN Hot	Sales	Certifications
A3! First Spring EP	2017	Released: May 24, 2017; Label: Pony Canyon; Formats: CD, digital download	5	5	JPN: 28,602	—N/a
A3! First Summer EP	2017	Released: May 24, 2017; Label: Pony Canyon; Formats: CD, digital download	3	4	JPN: 30,899	—N/a
A3! First Autumn EP	2017	Released: June 28, 2017; Label: Pony Canyon; Formats: CD, digital download	3	4	JPN: 32,326	—N/a
A3! First winter EP	2017	Released: June 28, 2017; Label: Pony Canyon; Formats: CD, digital download	5	5	JPN: 28,105	—N/a
A3! Blooming Spring EP	2017	Released: October 4, 2017; Label: Pony Canyon; Formats: CD, digital download	3	3	JPN: 24,445	—N/a
A3! Blooming Summer EP	2017	Released: October 4, 2017; Label: Pony Canyon; Formats: CD, digital download	4	4	JPN: 23,499	—N/a
A3! Blooming Autumn EP	2017	Released: November 1, 2017; Label: Pony Canyon; Formats: CD, digital download	3	4	JPN: 25,249	—N/a
A3! Blooming Winter EP	2017	Released: November 1, 2017; Label: Pony Canyon; Formats: CD, digital download	4	5	JPN: 24,300	—N/a
A3! Vivid Spring EP	2018	Released: October 3, 2018; Label: Pony Canyon; Formats: CD, digital download	2	2	JPN: 30,023	—N/a
A3! Vivid Summer EP	2018	Released: October 3, 2018; Label: Pony Canyon; Formats: CD, digital download	3	3	JPN: 27,531	—N/a
A3! Vivid Autumn EP	2018	Released: November 7, 2018; Label: Pony Canyon; Formats: CD, digital download	2	2	JPN: 27,982	—N/a
A3! Vivid Winter EP	2018	Released: November 7, 2018; Label: Pony Canyon; Formats: CD, digital download	4	3	JPN: 24,980	—N/a
A3! Bright Spring EP	2019	Released: June 26, 2019; Label: Pony Canyon; Formats: CD, digital download	6	9	JPN: 16,550	—N/a
A3! Bright Summer EP	2019	Released: June 26, 2019; Label: Pony Canyon; Formats: CD, digital download	7	10	JPN: 16,309	—N/a
A3! Bright Autumn EP	2019	Released: July 24, 2019; Label: Pony Canyon; Formats: CD, digital download	5	6	JPN: 18,004	—N/a
A3! Bright Winter EP	2019	Released: July 24, 2019; Label: Pony Canyon; Formats: CD, digital download	6	7	JPN: 17,241	—N/a
"—" denotes releases that did not chart or were not released in that region.

=== Soundtrack albums ===
List of albums, with selected chart positions, sales figures and certifications
Title	Year	Album details	Peak chart positions		Sales	Certifications
Title	Year	Album details	JPN Oricon	JPN Hot	Sales	Certifications
A3! OST	2018	Released: August 22, 2018; Label: Pony Canyon; Formats: CD, digital download	33	45	JPN: 2,321	—N/a
A3! OST 2	2019	Released: September 3, 2019; Label: Pony Canyon; Formats: CD, digital download	79	—	—	—N/a
"—" denotes releases that did not chart or were not released in that region.

=== Musical theater albums ===
List of albums, with selected chart positions, sales figures and certifications
Title	Year	Album details	Peak chart positions		Sales	Certifications
Title	Year	Album details	JPN Oricon	JPN Hot	Sales	Certifications
Mankai Stage: A3! Spring & Summer: Music Collection	2018	Released: November 21, 2018; Label: Pony Canyon; Formats: CD, digital download	34	43	JPN: 2,331	—N/a
Mankai Stage: A3! Autumn & Winter: Music Collection	2019	Released: April 24, 2019; Label: Pony Canyon; Formats: CD, digital download	12	10	JPN: 6,496	—N/a
Mankai Stage: A3! Spring 2019: Music Collection	2019	Released: July 17, 2019; Label: Pony Canyon; Formats: CD, digital download	10	12	JPN: 6,832	—N/a
Mankai Stage: A3! Summer 2019: Music Collection	2019	Released: November 20, 2019; Label: Pony Canyon; Formats: CD, digital download	11	9	JPN: 4,972	—N/a
Mankai Stage: A3! Autumn 2020: Music Collection	2020	Released: April 22, 2020; Label: Pony Canyon; Formats: CD, digital download	TBA	TBA	TBA	—N/a
Mankai Stage: A3! Mankai Selection Vol. 1	2020	Released: June 17, 2020; Label: Pony Canyon; Formats: CD, digital download	TBA	TBA	TBA	—N/a
"—" denotes releases that did not chart or were not released in that region.

== Singles ==
=== A-side singles ===
List of singles, with selected chart positions, sales figures and certifications
Title	Year	Peak chart positions			Sales	Album
Title	Year	JPN	JPN Hot	JPN Ani.	Sales	Album
"Shukashūtō Blooming!" (春夏秋冬☆Blooming!) (lit. Four Seasons Blooming!)	2018	3	6	2	JPN: 36,288	Non-album single
"Golden Encore"	2018	3	13	3	JPN: 20,784	Non-album single
"Act! Addict! Actors!"	2020	8	95	12	JPN: 6,436	Non-album single
"Home"	2020	5 (Note: "Home" and "Orange Heart" were released physically as a double A-side single. The sales count and Oricon ranking reflects both songs combined.)	—	—	JPN: 3,172	Non-album single
"Orange Heart" (オレンジ・ハート)	2020	5	—	—	JPN: 3,172	Non-album single
"—" denotes releases that did not chart or were not released in that region.

=== Character singles ===
List of singles, with selected chart positions, sales figures and certifications
Title	Year	Peak chart positions	Sales	Album
Title	Year	JPN	Sales	Album
Mankai Company Music Koen "Uraomote Teacher" Single	2018	10	JPN: 12,975	A3! Mix Seasons LP
"—" denotes releases that did not chart or were not released in that region.

== Other charted songs ==
Title	Year	Peak chart positions		Sales	Album
Title	Year	JPN Hot	JPN Ani.	Sales	Album
"Growing Pain"	2018	46	8	JPN: 1,378 (download & streaming)	A3! Mix Seasons LP
"—" denotes releases that did not chart or were not released in that region.
