= Nobunaga Teacher's Young Bride =

Japanese manga and anime series

- Cover of the first tankōbon volume, featuring Saitō Kichō

ノブナガ先生の幼な妻 (Nobunaga Sensei no Osanazuma)
- Genre: Romantic comedy
- Manga
- Written by: Azure Konno
- Published by: Futabasha
- Magazine: Monthly Action
- Original run: May 25, 2017 – August 24, 2019
- Volumes: 5
- Anime television series
- Directed by: Tokihiro Sasaki
- Produced by: Taisuke Hashirayama; Taiga Itou; Yoshinobu Iwatani; Shizuka Tonuma; Hiroyuki Araki
- Written by: Yuuzou Arika
- Studio: Seven
- Original network: AT-X, Tokyo MX
- Original run: April 6, 2019 – June 22, 2019
- Episodes: 12

Nobunaga Teacher's Young Bride (Japanese: ノブナガ先生の幼な妻, Hepburn: Nobunaga Sensei no Osanazuma) is a Japanese romantic comedy manga series by Azure Konno. It was serialized in Futabasha's seinen manga magazine Monthly Action from May 2017 to August 2019 and has been collected in five tankōbon volumes. An anime television series adaptation by Seven aired from April to June 2019.

== Characters ==
Nobunaga Oda (織田信永, Oda Nobunaga)
Voiced by: Kōdai Sakai
A teacher who loves gal games. He dreams of being in a harem surrounded by many girls, just like in games. However, he has never been able to get a girlfriend, so those dreams of a harem are still just dreams. Because he is a descendant of the historical Oda Nobunaga with a similar-sounding name (written with different kanji characters), his students call him "Nobunaga-sensei", though it is said that it could be his reincarnation of Oda Nobunaga himself because of the similarity they have.
Saitō Kichō (斎藤帰蝶, Saitō Kichō)
Voiced by: Akari Uehara
A 15-year-old girl who came from the Warring States era. She should have been betrothed to Oda Nobunaga in a political marriage, but she time-traveled to the present day. She develops feelings for Nobunaga Oda.
Ikoma Kitsuno (生駒吉乃, Ikoma Kitsuno)
Voiced by: Ari Ozawa
Oda Nobunaga's concubine who was transported from the Warring States era to the present day. She lost her life at the age of 29, but was transported in a younger form to the present. She is aware that she has been reborn and Nobunaga Oda is from another era, and she is shown to have a yandere personality when she sees Nobunaga with another woman. She can also sense who is Oda's concubine by looking into their soul.
Mayu Biwajima (枇杷島万結, Biwajima Mayu)
Voiced by: Konomi Yūzaki
Mayu is a student of Nobunaga Oda. She fell in love with him before the start of the beginning of the series when he complimented her on her BL artwork. She is a descendant of Onabe, one of the concubines of Oda Nobunaga. While initially shy and timid, when she is touched by Nobunaga, she enters a sort of trance and desires Nobunaga to be physically intimate with her.
Yuri Hoshigaoka (星ヶ丘友里, Hoshigaoka Yuri)
Voiced by: Marika Tanaka
Yuri is a teacher who works in the same school as Nobunaga. She is descendant of Jitokuin, one of Oda Nobunaga's concubines, who was also the wet nurse of Ikoma's daughter. She initially showed no interest in Nobunaga, but after being touched by Nobunaga she is shown to have a growing obsession for him.
Anna Atsuta (熱田杏南, Atsuta Anna)
Voiced by: Moe Toyota
Anna is Mayu Biwajima's classmate as well as her best friend.
Ichika Oda (織田市香, Oda Ichika)
Voiced by: Suzuna Kinoshita
Ichika is the younger sister of Nobunaga, she lives with her parents. According to Ikoma, she is the reincarnation of Lady Oichi, Oda Nobunaga's younger sister who is very wise.
Ranma Atsuta (熱田欄間, Atsuta Ranma)
Voiced by: Kōki Miyata
Anna's brother who likes to cross dress. He is the reincarnation of Mori Ranmaru, an attendant of Oda Nobunaga's with whom he was physically intimate. After being touched by Oda, he knows want to marry him.

== Media ==
=== Manga ===
Nobunaga Teacher's Young Bride, written and illustrated by Azure Konno, was serialized in Futabasha's Monthly Action magazine from May 25, 2017, to August 24, 2019. Five tankōbon volumes were published from November 10, 2017, to October 11, 2019.

No.	Release date	ISBN
1	November 10, 2017	978-4-575-85061-1
2	May 11, 2018	978-4-575-85153-3
3	December 12, 2018	978-4-575-85240-0
4	March 12, 2019	978-4-575-85277-6
5	October 11, 2019	978-4-575-85359-9

=== Anime ===
An anime television series adaptation was announced on December 11, 2018. The series was animated by Seven and directed by Tokihiro Sasaki, with Arikura Arika handling series composition, and Takashi Nishikawa designing the characters. The series aired from April 6 to June 22, 2019, on AT-X and Tokyo MX's FutabAnime time slot. The opening theme is "Aiseyo Minna, Hai!" (恋せよみんな、ハイ！) by Pyxis, while the ending theme is "Returner Butterfly" by Rika Tachibana. Crunchyroll streamed the series.

No.	Title	Original release date
1	"It's Good That my Wife Came"; Transliteration: "Tsuma ga kita no wa īmono no" (Japanese: 妻が来たのは いいものの)	April 6, 2019
2	"Nobunaga's Determination"; Transliteration: "Nobunaga no Ketsui" (Japanese: ノブナガの決意)	April 13, 2019
3	"Kicho Goes to School"; Transliteration: "Kichō gakkō e iku" (Japanese: 帰蝶 学校へ行く)	April 20, 2019
4	"To Inabayama Castle"; Transliteration: "Inaba Yamashiro e" (Japanese: 稲葉山城へ)	April 27, 2019
5	"Second Person"; Transliteration: "Futari-me" (Japanese: 二人目)	May 4, 2019
6	"I'll Wash Your Back"; Transliteration: "Senaka o nagashimasu" (Japanese: 背中を流します)	May 11, 2019
7	"Third Person"; Transliteration: "Sannin-me" (Japanese: 三人目)	May 18, 2019
8	"Fourth Person"; Transliteration: "Yonnin-me" (Japanese: 四人目)	May 25, 2019
9	"Reasons for Liking Him"; Transliteration: "Suki no Riyū" (Japanese: 好きの理由)	June 1, 2019
10	"Fifth Person!?"; Transliteration: "Gonin-me!?" (Japanese: 五人目！？)	June 8, 2019
11	"Jitoku-in Temple and The Wishes of the Pot"; Transliteration: "Jitokuin to o nabe no hō no nozomi" (Japanese: 慈徳院とお鍋の方の望み)	June 15, 2019
12	"My Wife Said She Wasn't Coming Back"; Transliteration: "Tsuma wa kaeranai to īmashita" (Japanese: 妻は帰らないと言いました)	June 22, 2019

== See also ==
- Koe de Oshigoto! – Another manga series by the same author
