= The Marginal Service =

Japanese anime television series

- Key visual
- Created by: Cygames
- Anime television series
- Directed by: Masayuki Sakoi
- Written by: Kenta Ihara
- Music by: Yūsuke Seo
- Studio: Studio 3Hz
- Licensed by: Crunchyroll
- Original network: NTV, SUN, KBS Kyoto, TVA, BS NTV, TVQ
- Original run: April 12, 2023 – June 28, 2023
- Episodes: 12
- icon

The Marginal Service (stylized in all caps) is an original Japanese anime television series animated by studio 3Hz and produced by Cygames. It is directed by Masayuki Sakoi and written by Kenta Ihara, with Yoshio Kosakai designing the characters, and Yūsuke Seo composing the music. The series aired from April 12 to June 28, 2023, on NTV's AnichU programming block and other channels. The opening theme song is "Quiet explosion" by Mamoru Miyano, while the ending theme song is "Salt & Sugar" by Yuma Uchida. Crunchyroll streamed the series in the English speaking regions.

== Characters ==
Brian Nightraider (ブライアン・ナイトレイダー, Buraian Naitoreidā)
Voiced by: Mamoru Miyano
American-born police detective with a high success rate, though his attitude grates on his superiors. After being fired from his job, Brian falls into alcoholism before being recruited to join The Marginal Service.
Zeno Stokes (ゼノ・ストークス, Zeno Sutōkusu)
Voiced by: Toshiyuki Morikawa
Veteran former detective working with The Marginal Service who reluctantly partners up with Brian. He knows all the rules and regulations involving Borderlanders and the UN and carries himself with an overly serious demeanor everywhere he goes, in contrast to Brian's freewheeling attitude.
Bolts Dexter (ボルツ・デクスター, Borutsu Dekusutā)
Voiced by: Tomokazu Sugita
A former American mercenary obsessed with bodybuilding and protein, and carries the heaviest weaponry.
Robin Timbert (ロビン・ティンバート, Robin Tinbāto)
Voiced by: Yuichi Nakamura
A former spy with MI6 whose style often clashes with Bolts.
Lyra Candeyheart (ライラ・キャンディハート, Raira Kyandihāto)
Voiced by: Kaori Nazuka
A woman who provides tech support for the Marginal Service.
Cyrus N. Kuga (サイラス・N・空閑, Sairasu N Kuga)
Voiced by: Hiro Shimono
The field medic of the Marginal Service with a cool demeanor.
Theodore Tompson (セオドア・トンプソン, Seodoa Tonpuson)
Voiced by: Shin-ichiro Miki
The old administrator of The Marginal Service.
Peck Desmont (ペック・デズモント, Pekku Dezumonto)
Voiced by: Koki Uchiyama
A Borderlander in the form of a talking squirrel, and the unofficial mascot of The Marginal Service.
Rubber Suit (ラバー・スーツ, Rabā Sūtsu)
Voiced by: Yuma Uchida
Currently the most famous pop star on Earth, a secret Borderlander engaged in alien drug trafficking.

== Episodes ==
No.	Title	Directed by	Written by	Storyboarded by	Original release date
1	"Leather Jacket Is Slippery"; Transliteration: "Kawajan wa Suberiyasui" (Japanese: 革ジャンは滑りやすい)	Yūichi Nakazawa	Kenta Ihara	Masayuki Sakoi	April 12, 2023
Brian Nightraider chases down a suspect in a drug case when the man appears to struggle against an invisible enemy before shooting himself. The police chief refuses to believe Brian's story, saying that all evidence pointed to a suicide to avoid interrogation, and promptly kicks Brian off the force for his cumulative actions that ended with his partner dying from a gunshot wound. Several days later, an alcoholic Brian receives an invitation from a strange UN research group. He finds himself in a museum of various international artifacts, when a man named Theodore introduces him to the true purpose of the invitation, to join a secret group that monitors "Borderlanders," alien monsters that secretly live among humanity, and to take down those that pose a threat. Brian reluctantly joins an old detective named Zeno as they head to a nearby bar to stake out a potential alien drug deal. Brian is shocked to find out that Zeno's scope confirms the drug dealer is both an alien and his former boss. However, the chief's alien physiology makes him more resistant to damage than normal humans. Brian and Zeno manage to lure the chief to a nearby construction site, where the rest of "The Marginal Service" show up and bring unique weaponry to destroy him.
2	"One Step and Riddled with Bullets"; Transliteration: "Suteppu Fundara Hachi no Su" (Japanese: ステップ踏んだらハチの巣)	Nao Miyoshi	Kenta Ihara	Masayuki Sakoi	April 19, 2023 (Note: This episode aired at 1:49 a.m. JST, 20 minutes after the original air time.)
Brian gets a history lesson on first contact with alien invaders and the Earth-native cryptids who helped humanity fight them off. The Marginal Service follows a lead on the drugs the chief was selling, and send a team to the land of Jukai, but the chopper carrying the team is shot down by Borderlander insurgents. Unable to call for help, Brian and Zeno search through the wind caves while Bolts and Robin follow their own trail. Eventually, Brian and Zeno uncover the main drug factory, but are captured by the Borderlanders. Before they are executed, Bolts and Robin jump in, having found the team's special weaponry from the exploded chopper, and eliminate the Borderlanders. However, their modified rocket launcher blows up the entire site. Zeno later finds out that the ringleader of the Borderlander drug ring is Rubber Suit, a world-famous pop star.
3	"Don't Overeat Caviar"; Transliteration: "Kyabia no Tabesugi ni Chūi" (Japanese: キャビアの食べ過ぎに注意)	Takuma Suzuki	Kenta Ihara	Masayoshi Nishida	April 26, 2023
The Marginal Service gets word that Rubber Suit owns a mythical Crystal Skull that was used to produce the super drug. After some investigation, the team finds out that Rubber plans to hold a charity auction and gala at his mansion, and so they put together a mission to infiltrate his mansion and enter his secure vault during the gala to steal the skull. Despite some initial trouble, Brian enters the vault but is unable to find the Crystal Skull. Rubber's head of security, a harpy-like Borderlander, catches Brian leaving the vault and shoots him. However, Brian is saved by using Peck's body as a bulletproof shield and escapes. Zeno takes another look at the mansion's security camera feeds and finds the Crystal Skull is hidden in plain sight at the bottom of a giant cocktail glass. The other members of the Marginal Service put on a dance performance to distract Rubber himself while Peck steals the Skull and Zeno sets off a gas explosion to mask the team's exit. The next day, Rubber Suit is arrested for drug trafficking, but the person they caught was his human body double while the real Rubber Suit is still at large.
4	"That Absurd Switch"; Transliteration: "Rifujin na Ano Suicchi" (Japanese: 理不尽なあのスイッチ)	Shigeki Awai	Kenta Ihara	Shigeki Awai	May 3, 2023
A mad bomber is on the loose in Tokyo. The Marginal Service goes through different camera feeds to try and find a connection between the bombings, while Zeno and Brian visit Isabella Thorn, the now-fired head of security for Rubber Suit, only to discover another bomb on her table in a potted plant. As thanks for saving her from the bomb, Isabella tells Brian about Izuna Ren, a Borderlander activist who might be involved. Brian and Zeno visit his apartment, only to set off a booby trap that connects to a bomb with a fancy trigger mechanism. Brian manages to pick the lock of his alien cuffs, but fails to stop the device from triggering, which plays a Rubber Suit song instead of exploding. Putting the clues together from the other bombings and Izuna's apartment, they discover that Izuna plans to plant his last bomb at a nearby baseball stadium. Brian and Zeno arrest Izuna, who turns out to be a tengu-like Borderlander, trying to resurrect the old markers of the Borderlanders that were lost to history and myth when humans built over them. Brian then allows the fireworks to go off, even though that results in a giant marker appearing in the middle of the stadium.
5	"Sexy Santa Lights the Holy Night"; Transliteration: "Sekushī Santa wa Seika o Tomosu" (Japanese: セクシーサンタは聖火を灯す)	Harume Kosaka	Kenta Ihara	Harume Kosaka	May 10, 2023
6	"Boobs for a Marmot, Air Tank for a Shark"; Transliteration: "Māmotto ni wa Boin. Same ni wa Bonbe" (Japanese: マーモットにはボイン。サメにはボンベ)	Umino Ikatarou	Kenta Ihara	Umino Ikatarou	May 17, 2023 (Note: This episode aired at 2:19 a.m. JST, 50 minutes after the original air time.)
7	"Making Up Is the Beginning of Another Fight"; Transliteration: "Nakanaori wa Kenka no Hajimari" (Japanese: 仲直りはケンカの始まり)	Kunio Fujii, Takuma Suzuki	Kenta Ihara, Takeshi Hashiguchi	Masayuki Sakoi	May 24, 2023
8	"Zombies Prefer Shopping Malls?"; Transliteration: "Zonbi wa Shoppingu Mōru ga Osuki？" (Japanese: ゾンビはショッピングモールがお好き？)	Shigeki Awai, Umino Ikatarou	Kenta Ihara	Yoriyasu Kogawa	May 31, 2023 (Note: This episode aired at 1:24 a.m. JST, 5 minutes after the original air time.)
9	"An Ounce of Energy Drink Is Worth a Pound of Cure"; Transliteration: "Korobanu Saki no Enajī Dorinku" (Japanese: 転ばぬ先のエナジードリンク)	Akira Shimizu	Kenta Ihara, Takeshi Hashiguchi	Hirohide Shikishima	June 7, 2023
10	"You're Always Not There When I Want to Hit You"; Transliteration: "Naguritai Toki ni Omae wa Itsumo Inai" (Japanese: 殴りたい時におまえはいつもいない)	Akira Shimizu	Kenta Ihara	Masayoshi Nishida	June 14, 2023
11	"When You Wish Upon a Star, a Star Shall Have the Guitar and Perfume"; Transliteration: "Hoshi ni Negai o. Sutā ni wa Gitā to Kōsui o" (Japanese: 星に願いを。スターにはギターと香水を)	Harume Kosaka	Kenta Ihara, Takeshi Hashiguchi	Harume Kosaka	June 21, 2023
12	"Shitty World Will in Fact Come to an End"; Transliteration: "Kuso mitai na Sekai wa Kanarazu Owaru" (Japanese: クソみたいな世界は必ず終わる)	Kazuho Kunimoto	Kenta Ihara	Masayuki Sakoi	June 28, 2023
