= Flip Flappers =

Japanese anime television series

フリップフラッパーズ (Furippu Furappāzu)
- Genre: Comedy; Magical girl; Sci-fi
- Created by: Pure Illusionist
- Anime television series
- Directed by: Kiyotaka Oshiyama
- Produced by: Takayuki Nagatani (Infinite)
- Written by: Yuniko Ayana
- Music by: To-Mas
- Studio: Studio 3Hz
- Licensed by: NA: Sentai Filmworks; UK: MVM Films
- Original network: Tokyo MX, AT-X, BS Fuji, SUN
- English network: SEA: Animax
- Original run: October 6, 2016 – December 29, 2016
- Episodes: 13
- icon

Flip Flappers (Japanese: フリップフラッパーズ, Hepburn: Furippu Furappāzu) is a Japanese anime television series produced by Studio 3Hz. It was directed by Kiyotaka Oshiyama and written by Yuniko Ayana, with concept art by Tanu, character designs by Takashi Kojima, and music by To-Mas. The 13-episode series first aired from October to December 2016. Flip Flappers revolves around two girls, Papika and Cocona, as they travel through parallel universes to gather fragments of a wish-granting object.

Oshiyama, who previously worked on Den-noh Coil and Space Dandy, debuted as a series director with Flip Flappers. During production, several staff members departed from the project and the airing date was delayed from 2015 to 2016. The series has been examined for its thematic connections to psychology and fairy tales; Oshiyama has cited the influence Jungian psychology and theories of perception in developing the show's concept. Further analysis has focused on the yuri elements in Cocona and Papika's relationship.

Flip Flappers has received generally positive reviews: commentators praised its visual identity and treatment of intimacy between its protagonists, though many were critical towards the role of fanservice in the series and the production quality of later episodes. The series is licensed by Sentai Filmworks in North America, who released an English-language dub in 2017, and by MVM Films in the United Kingdom.

== Plot ==
Cocona, a girl who lives with her grandmother in Fukushima, attends middle school with her childhood friend Yayaka. While struggling to choose a future high school, Cocona sees a girl on a flying surfboard. The girl introduces herself as Papika and tries to befriend Cocona before a robot drags them down a pipe. Entering a world called Pure Illusion, Cocona uses superhuman abilities to save Papika from falling into an ocean. Shocked at the day's events, Cocona returns with Papika to the real world, and wakes up holding a glowing stone.

Papika says that the glowing stone is a fragment of a wish-granting object, and that she needs Cocona as a partner to find the remainder in Pure Illusion. While initially reluctant, Cocona accepts her invitation. Papika recruits Cocona into an organization called FlipFlap; its leader, Salt, is determined to find the "amorphous" fragments to "liberate Pure Illusion." During an expedition in a desert world, Cocona and Papika transform into magical girls named Pure Blade and Pure Barrier. They discover that Yayaka and her two cohorts, Toto and Yuyu, are also hunting fragments on behalf of Asclepius, FlipFlap's rival organization. In successive trips to Pure Illusion, Cocona and Papika solve a time loop, experience the memories of their upperclassman Iroha Irodori, and collaborate with Yayaka to collect more fragments. Toto and Yuyu attack and abandon Yayaka when she fails to retrieve a fragment inside Cocona's thigh. As FlipFlap treats Yayaka's injuries, Papika regains memories of the past and briefly mistakes Cocona for Mimi, the name of Papika's former partner and a recurring figure in Cocona's dreams.

Asclepius attacks FlipFlap, and Yuyu divulges that Yayaka had initially befriended Cocona to spy on her for Ascelpius. Cocona evades capture but is ambushed by her grandmother, an Asclepius robot, who tells her that "everything was a lie." Mimi, revealed to be Cocona's mother, reappears by possessing Cocona's body and absorbs the collected fragments. After taking over Asclepius, Mimi vows to make Pure Illusion a place for Cocona alone. It transpires that Mimi, Papika, and Salt were escapees of a laboratory. Mimi, a test subject described as "the only one who can go to Pure Illusion", assumed a possessive personality and destroyed the laboratory after the researchers took Cocona away from her. Papika stopped Mimi by embracing and shattering her, which created the fragments. After wandering Pure Illusion, Papika collapsed under a tree and physically reverted to Cocona's age.

In the present, Yayaka and Papika return to Pure Illusion to save Cocona from Mimi's control. While battling Mimi and monsters from previous worlds, Yayaka achieves her own transformation with a fragment she received from Salt. Mimi's gentler personality manifests in Pure Illusion and convinces Cocona to choose her own path in life. Cocona and Papika proclaim their love for each other and defeat Mimi's possessive personality. After briefly losing each other in Pure Illusion, the two return to the real world.

== Characters ==
=== Primary characters ===
Cocona (ココナ, Kokona) / Pure Blade (ピュアブレード, Pyua Burēdo)
Voiced by: Minami Takahashi (Japanese); Luci Christian (English)
An aimless, timid girl in her second year of middle school. She lives with her grandmother and is Yayaka's childhood friend. After joining Papika on several bizarre adventures in Pure Illusion, she is recruited into FlipFlap and discovers that she can transform into the magical girl Pure Blade. Later in the series, her mother Mimi revives and attempts to keep her in Pure Illusion. Though initially acquiescent, Cocona breaks free of Mimi's control when Papika reaches out to her. Her full name is Cocona Cocomine (ココミネ ココナ, Kokomine Kokona).
Papika (パピカ) / Pure Barrier (ピュアバリアー, Pyua Bariā)
Voiced by: M.A.O (Japanese); Brittney Karbowski (English)
An energetic and eccentric girl who recruits Cocona into FlipFlap. Her bond with Cocona grants them the power to enter Pure Illusion, where she can transform into the magical girl Pure Barrier. The two defeat Mimi's controlling personality after affirming their love for each other. Prior to the events of the series, Papika was a test subject named Papikana in a laboratory that studied Pure Illusion. Papika, Mimi and Salt made a botched escape attempt together; Papika was separated from Mimi in Pure Illusion and physically reverted to Cocona's age.
Yayaka (ヤヤカ)
Voiced by: Ayaka Ohashi (Japanese); Patricia Duran (English)
Cocona's blunt and sarcastic childhood friend, who works for the rival organization Asclepius alongside the twins Toto and Yuyu. It is revealed that she initially befriended Cocona to monitor her for Asclepius, but grew to love her over time. Though she resents Papika for intruding into her friendship with Cocona, she joins forces with FlipFlap after failing to retrieve the fragment in Cocona's thigh and being violently terminated from Asclepius. During Mimi's revival, she receives a fragment from Salt and uses it to transform into a magical girl.

=== Secondary characters ===
Salt (ソルト, Soruto)
Voiced by: Kenjiro Tsuda, Kōhei Amasaki (young) (Japanese); David Wald (English)
The head of the FlipFlap organization. Cold and pragmatic, he seeks to "liberate Pure Illusion" by collecting fragments. He is the son of the lead scientist that held Papika and Mimi as test subjects in a laboratory. A close confidante of Mimi, Salt is alluded to be Cocona's father and joined the botched escape attempt after learning that Mimi was pregnant.
Hidaka (ヒダカ)
Voiced by: Jun Fukushima (Japanese); David Matranga (English)
A scientist at FlipFlap. He is obsessed with researching Pure Illusion and is responsible for upgrading TT-392.
Sayuri (サユリ)
Voiced by: Yoko Hikasa (Japanese); Chelsea McCurdy (English)
A scientist at FlipFlap. Level-headed and caring, she works closely with Salt.
TT-392
Voiced by: Kazuyuki Okitsu (Japanese); Jay Hickman (English)
A robot that follows Papika everywhere, nicknamed "Bu-chan" (ブーちゃん).
Toto (トト)
Voiced by: Sayaka Inoue (Japanese); Philip Hays (English)
An elementary school student and Yuyu's twin brother, who works alongside Yayaka as Asclepius agents. He shares his younger sister's obedient and unforgiving personality. Described as one of the "amorphous children" by Asclepius, he cares deeply for his sister and puts himself in harm's way to protect her.
Yuyu (ユユ)
Voiced by: Airi Toshino (Japanese); Carli Mosier (English)
An elementary school student and Toto's twin sister. She wears a cast on her left arm when she is not in Pure Illusion. Though initially reverent to the leader of Asclepius, she chooses to heal Toto over the leader at the end of the series.
Nyunyu (ニュニュ)
Voiced by: Marika Kōno (Japanese); Emily Neves (English)
The third amorphous child who briefly replaces Yayaka before Asclepius is destroyed. She is very lively and gets along well with TT-392.
Uexküll (ユクスキュル, Yukusukyuru)
Voiced by: Michiyo Murase, Rikiya Koyama (Pure Illusion version) (Japanese); Mark X. Laskowski (English)
Cocona's pet rabbit, named after the scientist Jakob von Uexküll.
Iroha Irodori (彩 いろは, Irodori Iroha)
Voiced by: Saori Ōnishi (Japanese); Kira Vincent-Davis (English)
An upperclassman in the Art Club at Cocona's school. Initially closed off from other people, she becomes more sociable and less focused on her art after Cocona and Papika alter things within her Pure Illusion world.
Cocona's grandmother (ココナのおばあちゃん, Kokona no Obā-chan)
Voiced by: Tamie Kubota (Japanese); Tiffany Grant (English)
Cocona's grandmother. She is Cocona's guardian after the supposed death of her parents, but is revealed to be an Asclepius android.
Mimi (ミミ)
Voiced by: Ai Kayano (Japanese); Shelley Calene-Black (English)
Papika's previous partner and Cocona's mother. She possesses Cocona after all the amorphous fragments are gathered and fails to trap her in Pure Illusion. As a child, Mimi was held at a laboratory and studied for her ability to go to Pure Illusion. During a failed escape attempt, she gave into a destructive alternate personality and shattered into the amorphous fragments.

== Production ==
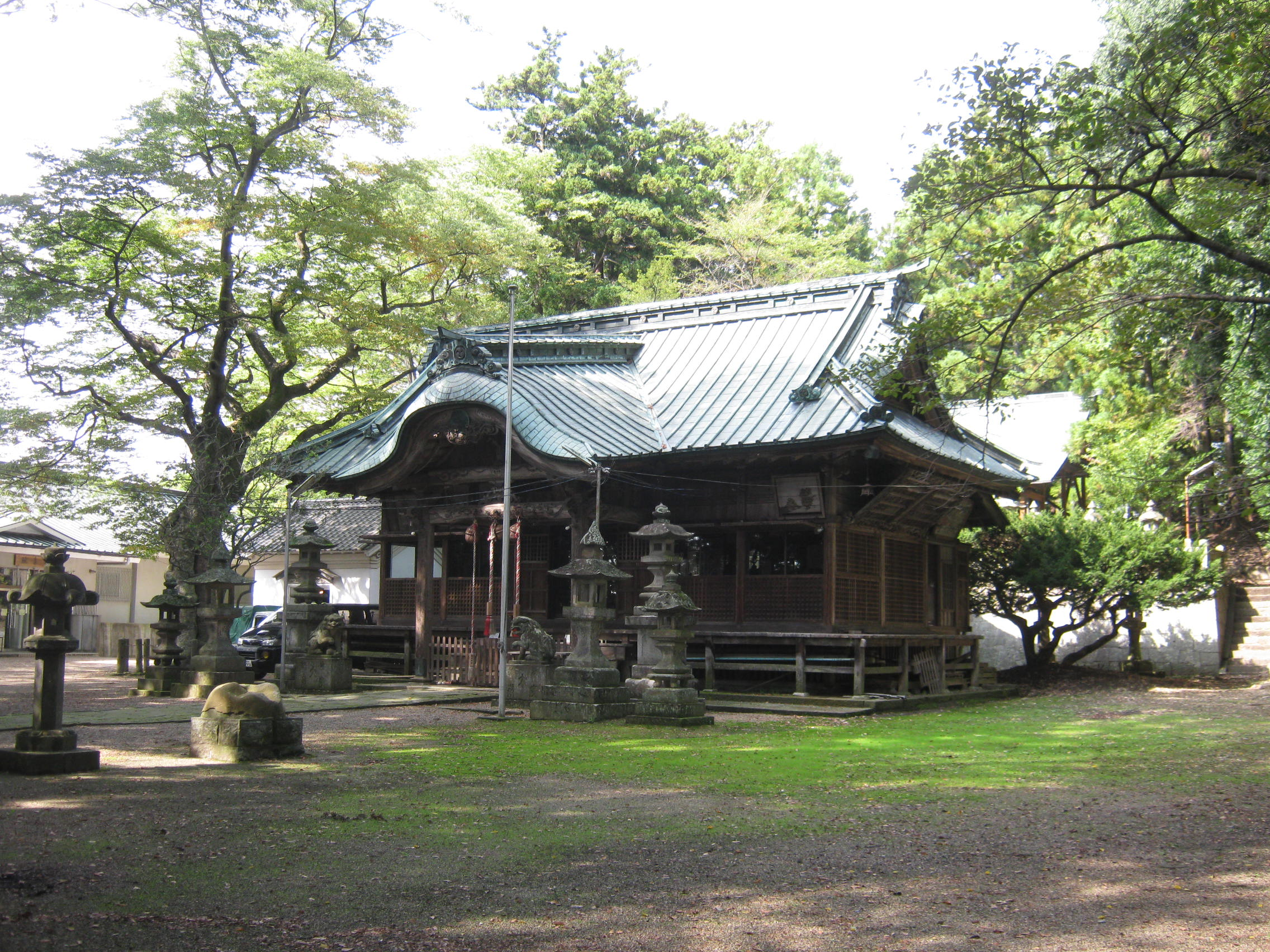
The series depicts several locations in Fukushima Prefecture, including Adatara Shrine in Motomiya

Flip Flappers was originally pitched as a space opera to series director Kiyotaka Oshiyama by the founders of Studio 3Hz. Oshiyama, who was a director of animation on Den-noh Coil and an episode director on Space Dandy, adjusted the show's concept by having the main characters traverse parallel universes instead of outer space. Oshiyama also designed several settings in the series from locations in Fukushima Prefecture, such as the Adatara Shrine and Mizuiro Park in his home town of Motomiya. The production team considered making the protagonists either primary or high school age, but settled on middle school to depict the emotional volatility of adolescence. In particular, Oshiyama likened Papika to protagonists in shōnen manga that he had read in his youth.

The concept art for Flip Flappers was created by Tanu, who previously designed characters for Tari Tari and The Rolling Girls. Under Oshiyama's direction, Tanu incorporated a butterfly motif in Papika and Cocona's magical girl outfits to represent their growth. Tanu's concept art was adapted into designs suited for animation by the character designer for Flip Flappers, Takashi Kojima. Oshiyama selected Kojima for his youth and key animation work in Your Lie in April. Early into production, Oshiyama and Kojima struggled to find common creative ground; Oshiyama often asked for retakes from Kojima and stated that their drawing styles "varied greatly from each other's". Kojima stated that he spent three months designing Cocona and Papika alone.

Flip Flappers was Oshiyama's debut as a series director; he later described the production as "an exhausting experience." Having contributed to the key animation, Oshiyama stated that working independently raised his personal workload but alleviated much of the stress that the project would have had on him. The show's premise of dimension-traveling necessitated new setting designs for each episode, and several staff members left in the middle of production. These included the lead writer Yuniko Ayana and background designers from Studio Pablo, who left after episodes 6 and 9, respectively. Infinite, a production company that had worked on Studio 3Hz's first series Celestial Method, supplied a writer for the series after Ayana's departure. To manage the limitations of a small staff, Oshiyama interspersed episodes with simpler animation between action-heavy ones, and recycled as much artwork as possible during the second half of the series. Though initially planned to air in July 2015, the show ultimately aired in October of the following year due to production delays.

== Media ==
=== Anime ===
The series by Studio 3Hz was announced on March 25, 2016. It was originally broadcast weekly from October 6 to December 29, 2016, and ran for 13 episodes. It aired on the regional station Tokyo MX, the pay channel AT-X, the satellite television channel BS Fuji, and Sun Television. It is licensed in North America by Sentai Filmworks and was simulcast by Hulu, Crunchyroll, and the Anime Network. In 2020, Crunchyroll removed Flip Flappers along with several other Sentai Filmworks titles from its services.

The series has received several physical releases, including six Blu-Ray and DVD volumes that were released in Japan beginning in 2017. Sentai Filmworks released a Blu-Ray set for the series in 2017; it included the English dubbed and subtitled editions in addition to a limited-edition booklet. The series is licensed by MVM Films in the United Kingdom for DVD and Blu-Ray; a collector's edition Blu-Ray set was released in 2018.

=== Music ===
The opening theme song "Serendipity" was sung by Zaq and arranged by RON. The soundtrack for Flip Flappers was composed by To-Mas, a three-member unit composed of Yohei Matsui, Masumi Itō, and Mito. Itō described the recording session as "a three-day festival"; certain vocal tracks incorporated khoomei throat singing, and Oshiyama asked To-Mas to include a didgeridoo. Mito struggled while writing a metal song for the soundtrack, as it strayed heavily from the pop style of his debut band, Clammbon. Under a time constraint, Itō repurposed a background track that they had recorded earlier in the session to make the melody for "Over the Rainbow", a character song performed by the voice actors who played Cocona and Papika.

To-Mas also wrote the ending theme song, "Flip Flap Flip Flap". The song was performed by Chima, who had previously been a backing vocalist for the band Galileo Galilei. The members of To-Mas agreed to bring Chima on as a guest vocalist after Itō attended one of Chima's concerts. Oshiyama had summarized Flip Flappers to To-Mas by asking: "How do you see the world around you?" Itō incorporated this question into the ending song's lyrics, along with Oshiyama's request for a Grimms' Fairy Tales-like impression.

== Themes ==
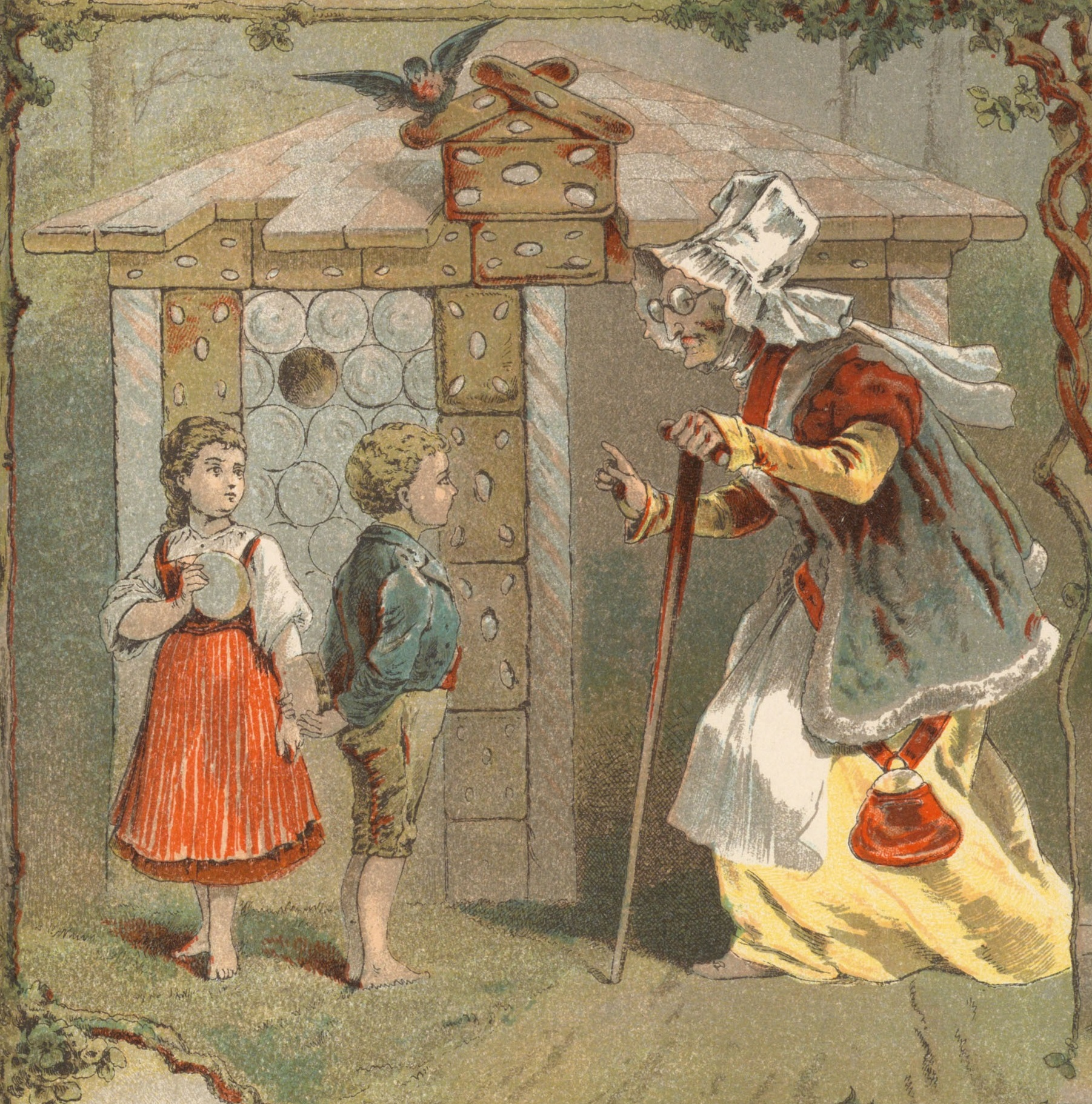
The series was influenced by the psychologist Hayao Kawai's study of Grimms' Fairy Tales

The concept of Pure Illusion was inspired by books on Jungian psychology and Jakob von Uexküll's theory of umwelt. Oshiyama also cited his personal interest in folklore and the psychologist Hayao Kawai's book on Grimms' Fairy Tales as a specific influence. While he added transformation scenes and weapons to enhance the project's appeal, Oshiyama considered the inclusion of Pure Illusion and fairy tales to have largely been his personal decision. Several commentators have offered specific psychological interpretations of Pure Illusion; The Encyclopedia of Science Fiction argues that the allusions to umwelt reflect how Pure Illusion is "shaped by various individual's perceptions", and Michael Goldstein, a contributor for Otaku USA, has stated that the dimension represents the fantasies of in-world characters. In an article for Crunchyroll, Peter Fobian noted the influence of Jungian psychology on the series and asserted that the worlds are aspects of the collective unconscious.

Flip Flappers features an intimate relationship between its protagonists, and Oshiyama has stated that the series incorporates yuri elements. Many critics have argued that the series depicts a romantic relationship between Cocona and Papika; Miles Thomas of Crunchyroll wrote that Flip Flappers engages with "homosexual tropes" to show Cocona's queer self-discovery, and Fobian claimed that Cocona expresses her own agency by choosing to reciprocate Papika's affections at the series finale. Scholar Arana Blas mentions Flip Flappers in an overview of yuri works, and contends that the series presents sexuality as a "part of the protagonist's growth". Some commentators have analyzed the fifth episode, which was set in a boarding school, in light of the yuri-related Class S genre. The Encyclopedia of Science Fiction describes the episode as a satire of the genre, while Anime Feminist argued that the episode critiques Class S stories by having Cocona and Papika's romantic relationship persevere outside of a school setting.

== Reception ==
"More popular in the West than Japan, Flip Flappers is a memorable series: it has flaws – not everything is clearly explained and there is some fan service, albeit cake-and-eat-it parody – but there is much to enjoy."

— Steven Pearce, The Encyclopedia of Science Fiction (2022)

Flip Flappers has received generally positive assessments from viewers and critics. The series reached number 29 in an online poll by the Tokyo Anime Awards Festival for the best anime of 2017, and was listed as one of the 100 best anime of the 2010s by Crunchyroll. Many reviewers complimented the series' visuals; Vulture felt that its action scenes were "incredibly impressive", and Otaku USA enthusiastically received the show as a "visually enchanting delight" due to its varied color schemes and world designs. Carlos Ross of THEM Anime Reviews praised the "outright stunning" execution of the show's references to other media; he suggested that the show made allusions to John William Waterhouse's paintings of Ophelia and The Lady of Shalott. Critic Richard Eisenbeis complimented the series as a "stunning visual experience" but felt that the plot suffered from a lack of exposition.

Early episodes of the series garnered praise; Anime News Network welcomed Oshiyama's direction and the contribution of veteran animators as an "impossible convergence of talent", and Kotaku applauded the "tender" depiction of Cocona and Papika's relationship. In a positive review for the first three episodes, Otaku USA remarked that spontaneity was one of the series' "oddball charms", but felt that the series lacked a substantive narrative. The show's concluding episodes drew criticism from some commentators; Anime UK News felt that the plot suffered from "poor implementation and story pacing" and was rushed in the latter half. In reviews for Anime News Network, Nick Creamer commended Flip Flappers for having "cheeky references to shows like Neon Genesis Evangelion and Penguindrum", whereas James Beckett felt that the show became a "clear Evangelion knock off" after the departure of its lead writer and saw a "marked decline in quality" in the show's latter third. Sakuga Blog was similarly critical, claiming that the production value dropped in the "rushed" final episodes, but made the caveat that it "remained above the average" compared to other televised anime.

The depiction of sexuality in Flip Flappers has been ambivalently received by several critics, who reserved praise for Cocona and Papika's relationship but felt that the characters were excessively sexualized by fanservice. Carlos Ross described the treatment of intimacy between the two lead characters as having "significantly more emotional depth and gentleness" than other yuri stories, and Anime Feminist contended that series had a "refreshingly honest" presentation of queer characters. Ross went on to argue that the presentation of nudity through middle school girls was "borderline salacious", and Anime Feminist likened the "invasive" camera angles to "nails on a chalkboard." In a similar vein, Creamer complimented the series for having "a remarkable union of emotional intent and visual execution" in its coming-of-age story, but criticized the fanservice for being "entirely out of place in the overall narrative."

The Encyclopedia of Science Fiction described Flip Flappers as a memorable and enjoyable anime, praising its varied and imaginative visual style and its increasingly complex narrative, in which initially surreal and seemingly disconnected adventures gradually reveal deeper themes. It highlighted the series' exploration of perception and subjective reality, comparing its depiction of worlds shaped by individual consciousness to Philip K. Dick's novel Eye in the Sky and relating it to biologist Jakob von Uexküll's concept of the Umwelt. The encyclopedia also considered the series' explicit portrayal of lesbian relationships unusual for anime, noting its partial satire of the Class S genre. Although it criticized some insufficiently explained plot elements and occasional fan service, it praised the show's thematic depth and distinctive artwork, while observing that it achieved greater popularity in the West than in Japan.

Oshiyama stated that Flip Flappers had an underwhelming release; he attributed the show's lack of success to an oversaturated anime market, declining DVD and Blu-Ray sales, and the limited adoption of streaming services in 2016. Oshiyama cited Flip Flappers' commercial struggles and the limitations of working under a larger studio as key motivators in his decision to establish Studio Durian in 2017. After directing the 2024 adaptation of Tatsuki Fujimoto's manga Look Back, Oshiyama stated that Fujimoto's decision to entrust Studio Durian with the adaptation may have been influenced by the fact that Fujimoto had previously watched Flip Flappers and enjoyed Oshiyama's work.

== Sources ==
FliFla Project (2017). Flip Flappers Limited Edition Booklet. Translated by Bull, Alicia; Lopez, Javier. North America: Sentai Filmworks. SFCFLP100BCK.
