= Kōdai Sakai =

Japanese voice actor

- 酒井 広大
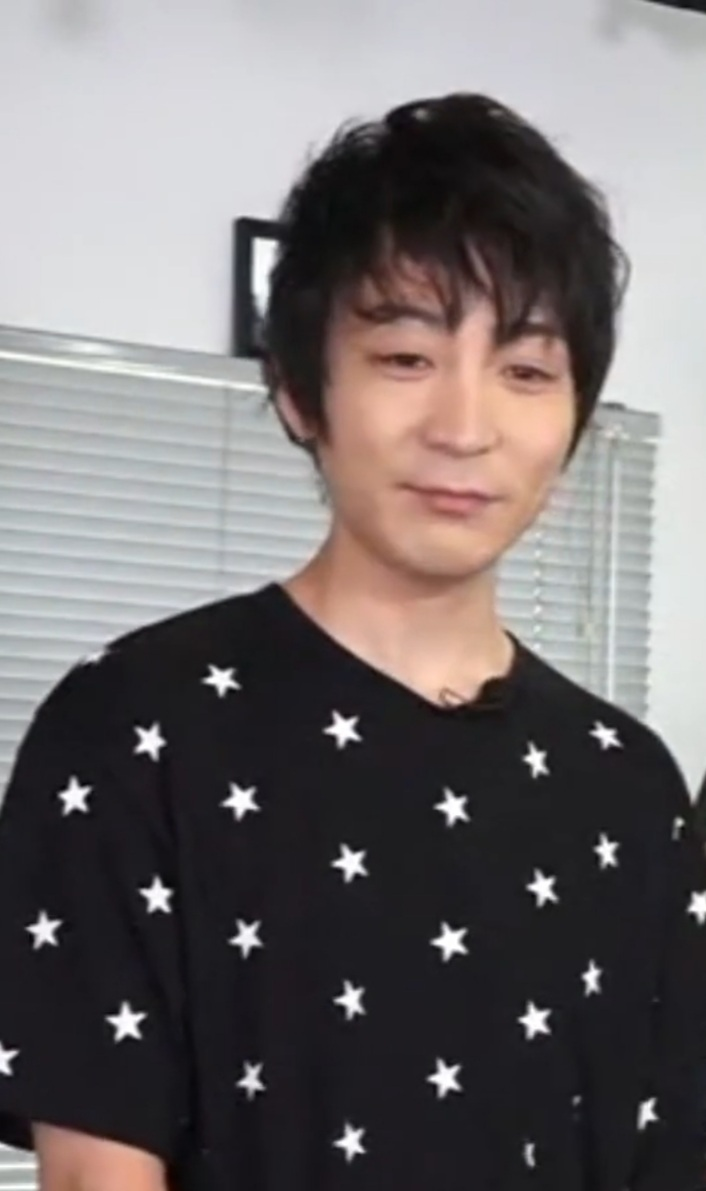
- Sakai in 2020
- Born: September 30, 1986 (age 39); Kurume, Japan
- Occupation: Voice actor
- Years active: 2013–present
- Notable work: The Lost Village as Mitsumune; Nobunaga Teacher's Young Bride as Nobunaga Oda; A3! as Sakuya Sakuma; Shadows House as Shaun
- Awards: Game award at the 14th Seiyu Awards

Kōdai Sakai (Japanese: 酒井広大, Hepburn: Sakai Kōdai; born September 30, 1986) is a Japanese voice actor. After watching Rika Matsumoto perform Ash Ketchum, Sakai decided he wanted to be a voice actor, which he did and made his debut in 2013. Some of the major roles Sakai has had since are Mitsumune in The Lost Village, Nobunaga Oda in Nobunaga Teacher's Young Bride, Sakuya Sakuma in A3!, and Shaun in Shadows House.

== Biography ==
Sakai was born in Kurume on September 30, 1986. In elementary school, Sakai was a fan of the Pokémon series, especially Rika Matsumoto's performance as Ash Ketchum, which would inspire him to become a voice actor. While working as a salaryman, he started watching anime again, which inspired to try voice acting again and quit his current job. He was later hired by Early Wing, where he made his voice acting debut as a caretaker in Karneval. In 2016, he received his first lead role with The Lost Village.

In 2020, Sakai won the game award at the 14th Seiyu Awards.

== Filmography ==
=== TV series ===
2015

- Brave Beats as Flash Beat

2016

- The Lost Village as Mitsumune
- All Out!! as Michio Sumiyoshi

2017

- King's Game The Animation as Toshiyuki Fujioka

2018

- Captain Tsubasa as Teppei Kisugi & Nishigaoka Soccer Club Member A (episode 3)
- The Master of Ragnarok & Blesser of Einherjar as Yuuto Suoh

2019

- Nobunaga Teacher's Young Bride as Nobunaga Oda

2020

- A3! as Sakuya Sakuma

2021

- Shadows House as Shaun/John
- Odd Taxi as Shun Imai

2022

- Shadows House 2nd Season as Shaun/John

2024

- Alya Sometimes Hides Her Feelings in Russian as Takeshi Maruyama
- Loner Life in Another World as Delinquent F

2025

- Tasokare Hotel as Haruto Atori

2026

- Suikoden: The Anime as Jess

=== Other ===
- Miseinen Dakedo Kodomo Janai movie comic as Isuzu Ebina

=== Dubbing ===
==== Animation ====
- The Haunted House (Tooniverse) – Hyun-woo Kim
