= Celestial Method =

Japanese anime television series

- Promotional poster for the series featuring the main protagonists

天体のメソッド (Sora no Mesoddo)
- Genre: Fantasy
- Created by: Kaleido Shift; Naoki Hisaya
- Manga
- Written by: Naoki Hisaya
- Illustrated by: Yuka Namisaki
- Published by: ASCII Media Works
- Magazine: Dengeki Daioh
- Original run: October 2014 – March 2015
- Volumes: 1
- Anime television series
- Directed by: Masayuki Sakoi
- Written by: Naoki Hisaya
- Music by: Tatsuya Kato
- Studio: Studio 3Hz
- Licensed by: NA: Sentai Filmworks
- Original network: Tokyo MX, BS11, TVh, KBS, SUN
- English network: SEA: Aniplus Asia
- Original run: October 5, 2014 – December 28, 2014
- Episodes: 13
- Original video animation
- Directed by: Masayuki Sakoi
- Studio: Studio 3Hz
- Released: July 24, 2015
- Runtime: 11 minutes
- Original net animation
- Directed by: Masayuki Sakoi
- Produced by: Takayuki Nagatani
- Studio: Studio 3Hz
- Released: October 11, 2019
- Runtime: 29 minutes

Celestial Method (天体のメソッド, Sora no Mesoddo) is a 13-episode Japanese anime television series created and written by Naoki Hisaya and produced by Studio 3Hz. The series aired in Japan between October 5 and December 28, 2014. A short original video animation episode was released on July 24, 2015. A manga adaptation illustrated by Yuka Namisaki was serialized in ASCII Media Works' Dengeki Daioh magazine.

== Plot ==
Nonoka Komiya is a girl who once lived in Lake Kiriya City, based on Lake Tōya in Hokkaido, where she met a blue-haired girl named Noel. Seven years later, Nonoka returns to the city, which now has a mysterious saucer floating above it, and reunites with Noel, who promises to grant her wish.

== Characters ==
Nonoka Komiya (古宮 乃々香, Komiya Nonoka)
Voiced by: Shiina Natsukawa
The protagonist who returns to Lake Kiriya after having moved away seven years before. She has lived with her father since her mother died due to an undisclosed illness.
Noel (ノエル, Noeru)
Voiced by: Inori Minase
A mysterious blue-haired girl whom Nonoka first met seven years ago. She is eventually revealed to be the saucer itself, which Nonoka and her friends had called down.
Yuzuki Mizusaka (水坂 柚季, Mizusaka Yuzuki)
Voiced by: Aki Toyosaki
An energetic girl who has a strong dislike for the saucer. She also seems to be on bad terms with her twin brother, Sōta.
Koharu Shiihara (椎原 こはる, Shiihara Koharu)
Voiced by: Haruka Yoshimura
An airheaded girl who works as a poster girl for a local shop devoted to the saucer.
Shione Togawa (戸川 汐音, Togawa Shione)
Voiced by: Mikako Komatsu
A stern girl who enjoys photography. She was once Nonoka's best friend but grew to hate her after she moved away without letting anyone know.
Sōta Mizusaka (水坂 湊太, Mizusaka Sōta)
Voiced by: Kaito Ishikawa, Megumi Han (young)
Yuzuki's twin brother who has feelings for Koharu.

== Media ==
=== Manga ===
A manga adaptation, written by Naoki Hisaya and illustrated by Yuka Namisaki, was serialized in ASCII Media Works' Dengeki Daioh magazine between the October 2014 and March 2015 issues with the series left unfinished. It was later reported in the December 2015 issue that the serialization had ended due to circumstances with the author. One tankōbon volume was released on October 27, 2014.

=== Anime ===
The 13-episode anime television series, produced by Studio 3Hz, aired in Japan on Tokyo MX between October 5 and December 28, 2014, and was simulcast by Crunchyroll. The series is directed by Masayuki Sakoi and written by Naoki Hisaya, with music by Tatsuya Kato and character designs by QP:flapper, consisting of duo artists Koharu Sakura and Tometa Ohara. An original video animation (OVA) episode was included on the seventh Blu-ray/DVD volume released on July 24, 2015. A special episode premiered on October 11, 2019, on the Infinite YouTube channel. The opening theme is "Stargazer" by Larval Stage Planning, and the ending theme is "Hoshikuzu no Interlude" (星屑のインターリュード) by Fhána. Sentai Filmworks has licensed the series for release in North America.

No.	Title	Original release date
1	"Saucer City"; Transliteration: "Enban no Machi" (Japanese: 円盤の街)	October 5, 2014
Nonoka Komiya moves with her family to her old hometown of Lake Kiriya City, which now has a large flying saucer floating above it. While her father is out the next day, Nonoka encounters a strange girl named Noel, who claims they met each other a long time ago. As Nonoka tries to remember who Noel is, she gets mad at her when she assumes she had cracked a photo of her late mother while unpacking her things, telling her not to appear before her again. Upon later learning that the crack was actually an accident on her father's part, Nonoka searches for Noel in order to apologise, during which she remembers knowing Noel from her childhood, realising she had been waiting at the observatory for her return. As the two reunite at the observatory, Noel states her desire to fulfill her promise to grant Nonoka's wishes.
2	"Their Promise"; Transliteration: "Futari no Yakusoku" (Japanese: ふたりの約束)	October 12, 2014
On her first day at school, Nonoka befriends with a girl named Koharu Shiihara, but becomes alienated by another girl in headphones, Shione Togawa, both of whom she had previously encountered while searching for Noel the other day. Another girl, Yuzuki Mizusaka, vents her irritation that no one else in town seems to be concerned about the saucer that appeared seven years ago, roping Nonoka into helping her protest against it. After getting into an argument with her brother, Souta, Yuzuki prepares to go fight against the saucer herself, but is stopped by Nonoka, who decides to help her with her cause provided she not do anything dangerous. Later that night, Nonoka asks Noel for help in getting the saucer to leave the city as well.
3	"Where Memories Live"; Transliteration: "Kioku no Arika" (Japanese: 記憶のありか)	October 19, 2014
While on an orienteering trip with the others, Nonoka feels confused as to why Shione is so hostile towards her. The girls soon encounter Noel along the way and have her join their group. Later, when it seems that Shione has strayed from the group, Nonoka goes off in search for her, unaware that Shione had actually gotten ahead of them, winding up lost herself. After ending up at an abandoned kindergarten and eventually being found by Noel, Nonoka remembers that not only was she friends with everyone seven years ago, but she was the one who suggested they call forth the saucer, with Noel revealing she is the saucer itself.
4	"A Fragment of Emotions"; Transliteration: "Omoi no Kakera" (Japanese: 思いのかけら)	October 26, 2014
Nonoka's apology for forgetting everything only earns her a slap from Yuzuki and further disdain from Shione. The next day, Nonoka tries to learn what had happened during her absence, but Yuzuki refuses to tell her and runs off to continue her protests, which Noel decides to help with. Nonoka later meets up with Souta, who hears from her about how Yuzuki had wanted to see fireworks long ago. After Koharu stops Yuzuki from protesting outside her store, she attempts to protest in the middle of the road instead, becoming depressed when Koharu effectively states her efforts to stop the saucer are meaningless. That night, as Koharu lets out all of her tears, Nonoka comes to her, asking for her help.
5	"Flower of Light"; Transliteration: "Hikari no Hana" (Japanese: 光の花)	November 2, 2014
Koharu helps Nonoka out as she tries to get permission for a fireworks show in a week's time. Meanwhile, Souta attempts to apologise to Yuzuki, who had been feeling guilty for a long time after Souta got injured while searching for her one day. On the day before the fireworks show, Koharu speaks with Yuzuki while Shione comes across Noel and tries to determine her relationship with Nonoka. The next day, Noel shows Yuzuki Nonoka's photo album, which shows Nonoka chose that date because it was the anniversary of their last fireworks festival. When Yuzuki arrives at the lake, she finds Nonoka, Koharu, and Souta waiting for her and apologises to them while Noel uses the saucer to project a fireworks display of her own.
6	"True Friends"; Transliteration: "Hontō no Tomodachi" (Japanese: 本当の友達)	November 9, 2014
Shione wins some hot spring inn tickets and invites Noel, while Yuzuki receives some tickets herself and invites Nonoka and Koharu, with both groups unaware that they are staying at the same place. While at the hotel, Yuzuki works up the courage to talk properly with Nonoka and apologises for her previous actions. The next day, Shione is taken aback a little when Noel considers her a friend, while Nonoka asks her father for a favor.
7	"What I Lost"; Transliteration: "Watashi no Nakushita Mono" (Japanese: 私のなくしたもの)	November 16, 2014
After inadvertently breaking the monster sign outside of Koharu's shop, Noel stays behind to try and fix it while Nonoka goes with Koharu and Yuzuki to the countryside to visit her mother's grave for her birthday. Arriving at the cemetery, Nonoka laments how the pain of losing her mother shortly after leaving Lake Kiriya led to her trying to forget what happened, including her time with her friends, but Koharu and Yuzuki assure Nonoka that her mother would still be proud of her. Meanwhile, Souta helps Noel with fixing the monster sign, explaining how he, Yuzuki, and Koharu made it together. While giving Nonoka some time alone, Koharu and Yuzuki come across Shione, who was visiting her own family's grave, before giving Nonoka the encouragement to try to make up with Shione. After arriving back home, Nonoka barely misses Shione, but hears from Noel that she wanted to watch the meteor shower with her.
8	"What She Believes"; Transliteration: "Kanojo no Shinjiru koto" (Japanese: 彼女の信じること)	November 23, 2014
Wanting to grant Shione's wish without waiting for the next meteor shower, Nonoka and the others decide to make a planetarium for the school's Hokubi Festival, inviting Shione to participate. The next day, Shione decides to visit Noel, who she had also met seven years ago, having previously received a message from her that Nonoka would return to watch the meteor shower with her, though the time she waited led her to become distrustful of her. Shione expresses to Noel how she is afraid of putting her trust in Nonoka again, but Noel gives her some encouragement. Later that night, Shione arrives at the finished planetarium, where Nonoka firmly states her desire of watching a meteor shower with her, with the two making up with each other. However, the next day, after Shione recalls Noel calling herself the saucer, she tells Nonoka that they can't be together.
9	"The Meaning of Goodbye"; Transliteration: "Sayonara no Imi" (Japanese: さよならの意味)	November 30, 2014
As Nonoka decides to put her trust in Shione and wait for her, Shione learns that Noel will disappear when she has granted everyone's wishes. While everyone else helps to finish the planetarium, Shione makes plans to move out of town, recalling how she and the others each made wishes while summoning the saucer. On the day of the festival, Nonoka escorts Noel around the school, becoming anxious over whether Shione will show up or not. Learning Shione is absent, Nonoka goes off to confront her over why she's trying to stay away from her, but is unable to get through to her. Noel then goes off in search of Nonoka, only to collapse in front of her.
10	"Where Wishes Go"; Transliteration: "Negai no Yukue" (Japanese: 願いの行方)	December 7, 2014
Realising Noel's condition is from straying too far from the saucer, Nonoka calls her father to take them back home to where she can see the saucer. After getting Noel back safely, Nonoka tells the others the truth that Noel is the saucer they summoned seven years ago, which is why she can't leave town. Nonoka later then learns from Noel that she will disappear when she fulfils her assigned wish, in this case, Shione's wish to smile together with Nonoka. The next day, Nonoka learns that Shione is transferring and goes to talk to her once more, learning that she intended to move so that Noel wouldn't have to disappear. As Nonoka becomes conflicted over choosing between Noel and Shione, Shione explains the situation concerning Noel to the others, who argue over who should leave so that Noel can stay. Truly wishing for everyone to smile together, Noel tells Nonoka they will have to part ways.
11	"Night of the Meteor Shower"; Transliteration: "Ryūseigun no Yoru" (Japanese: 流星群の夜)	December 14, 2014
With everyone still avoiding each other, Nonoka makes a decision to invite everyone to the observatory to watch the meteor shower, despite the cloudy weather. As Nonoka speaks with Shione, stating her desire to make everyone happy and asking her to speak to Noel, Souta, Yuzuki, and Koharu do their own reflecting, believing Noel granted their wishes to become friends with everyone. Later that night, Shione speaks with Noel, who says she is happiest when everyone else is happy. Afterwards, everyone, Shione included, gathers at the observatory, where they take some pictures together before Noel receives a signal telling her to go home. After a tearful farewell, everyone watches the meteor shower together, where Noel finds herself unable to hold back her tears as well before both she and the saucer vanish.
12	"Saucerless City"; Transliteration: "Enban no nai Machi" (Japanese: 円盤のない街)	December 21, 2014
Nonoka suddenly finds herself returning to the day she arrived in Lake Kiriya, this time with the saucer nowhere to be seen above the city, like it was never there to begin with. Furthermore, she discovers none of her friends have any memories of Noel or the saucer, and Shione is nowhere to be found, later learning she moved away during elementary school. As Nonoka starts to doubt herself over whether Noel even existed in the first place, Shione appears before her, revealing that she has also retained her memories of Noel.
13	"From the Starting Sky"; Transliteration: "Hajimari no Sora kara" (Japanese: はじまりのそらから)	December 28, 2014
After Shione encourages Nonoka to not give up on Noel, the two of them concoct a plan to bring everyone to the observatory. The others, despite still not remembering Noel, feel there is something important they are forgetting and agree to try and summon the saucer once more. Together, they wish to see Noel again, after which a large field of sunflowers suddenly appears near the observatory, but no Noel. The next day, Nonoka learns from her father that someone was in her house, while the others start to regain their memories of Noel, and together they head towards the sunflower field, where Noel is waiting for them.
OVA	"A Certain Girl's Day Off"; Transliteration: "Aru Shōjo no Kyūjitsu" (Japanese: ある少女の休日)	July 24, 2015
Curious about Shione constantly renting out a certain monster movie, Yuzuki has the others join her in following Shione during her free time. After finding that Shione had just been going to feed some ducks, they discover from Nonoka's copy of the movie that Shione has a bit part in it.
ONA	"One More Wish"; Transliteration: "Mō Hitotsu no Onegai" (Japanese: もうひとつの願い)	October 11, 2019
