= 3Hz =

Japanese animation studio

3Hz Inc.
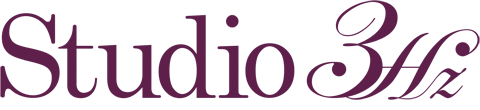
- Native name: 株式会社3Hz
- Romanized name: Kabushiki-gaisha San Herutsu
- Type: Kabushiki gaisha
- Industry: Japanese animation
- Founded: March 2013; 13 years ago
- Founder: Yūichirō Matsuka
- Defunct: June 17, 2024; 2 years ago
- Fate: Operations acquired by A-1 Pictures and folded
- Successor: A-1 Pictures
- Headquarters: Suginami, Tokyo, Japan
- Key people: Yūichirō Matsuka (CEO)
- Website: Official website

3Hz Inc. (Japanese: 株式会社3Hz, Hepburn: Kabushiki-gaisha San Herutsu) was a Japanese animation studio established by ex-Kinema Citrus animators, and founded by Yuichiro Matsuka in March 2013. The company is referred to as Studio 3Hz in anime credits.

On June 17, 2024, 3Hz announced that it had transferred its animation planning and production business to A-1 Pictures, adding that its business will continue at A-1 Pictures. This is further confirmed by the studio and the Sword Art Online Alternative: Gun Gale Online's X accounts that the same staff involved in the series, will continue to work at A-1 Pictures.

== Works ==
=== Television series ===
Year	Title	Director(s)	Source	Eps.	Refs.
2014	Celestial Method	Masayuki Sakoi	Original work	13	
2016	Dimension W (co-animated with Orange)	Kanta Kamei	Manga	12	
2016	Flip Flappers	Kiyotaka Oshiyama	Original work	13	
2017	Princess Principal (co-animated with Actas)	Masaki Tachibana	Original work	12	
2018	Sword Art Online Alternative: Gun Gale Online	Masayuki Sakoi	Light novel	12	
2020	Chidori RSC	Masanori Takahashi	Manga	12	
2020	A3! (co-animated with P.A. Works)	Masayuki Sakoi (Note: Credited as Series Director (シリーズディレクター, Shirīzu Direkutā) for Seasons Spring & Summer, and Director (監督, Kantoku) for Seasons Autumn & Winter.); Makoto Nakazono (Note: Credited as Director (監督, Kantoku) for Seasons Spring & Summer only.); Keisuke Shinohara	Mobile game	24	
2022	Healer Girl	Yasuhiro Irie	Original work	12	
2022	The Devil Is a Part-Timer!! (Season 2)	Daisuke Tsukushi	Light novel	12	
2023	The Marginal Service	Masayuki Sakoi	Original work	12	

=== Original video animations ===
Year	Title	Director(s)	Source	Eps.	Refs.
2015	Celestial Method	Masayuki Sakoi	Original work	1	
2016	Dimension W (co-animated with Orange)	Kanta Kamei	Manga	1	
2019	Celestial Method: One More Wish	Masayuki Sakoi	Original work	1	

=== Films ===
Year	Title	Director(s)	Source	Refs.
2019	Blackfox	Kazuya Nomura; Keisuke Shinohara	Original work	

=== Video games ===
Title	Publisher	Release date	Note(s)	Ref(s)
Tokyo Xanadu	Nihon Falcom	September 30, 2015	Opening animation.	
Ys VIII: Lacrimosa of Dana	Nihon Falcom	July 21, 2016	Opening animation.	
The Legend of Heroes: Trails of Cold Steel III	Nihon Falcom	September 28, 2017	Opening animation.	
The Legend of Heroes: Trails of Cold Steel IV	Nihon Falcom	September 27, 2018	Opening animation.	

== Notable staff ==
A list of notable staff currently or formerly belonging to the studio.

=== Representative staff ===
- Yūichirō Matsuya (founder and president)

=== Animation producers ===
- Hideaki Kubo (2014~2019)

=== Directors ===
- Yasuhiro Irie
