= A3! =

Japanese life simulation mobile game

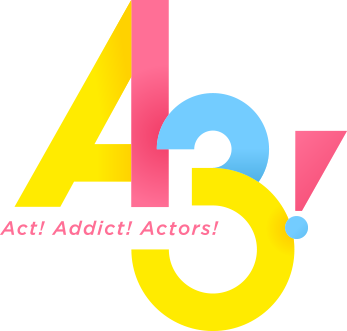
- Video game
- Developer: Liber Entertainment
- Publisher: Liber Entertainment; Cybird (worldwide)
- Genre: Life simulation
- Platform: iOS; Android
- Released: JP: January 27, 2017; WW: October 23, 2019
- Anime television series
- Directed by: Masayuki Sakoi (Note: Credited as Series Director (シリーズディレクター, Shirīzu Direkutā) for episodes 1–12, and as Director (監督, Kantoku) for episodes 13–24.); Makoto Nakazono (#1–12); Keisuke Shinohara (#1–12)
- Written by: Naoki Hayashi
- Music by: Masaru Yokoyama; Kana Hashiguchi
- Studio: P.A. Works; Studio 3Hz
- Licensed by: Crunchyroll; SA/SEA: Muse Communication
- Original network: Tokyo MX, SUN, KBS, BS11
- Original run: January 14, 2020 – December 29, 2020
- Episodes: 24

A3! (acronym for "Act! Addict! Actors!") is a Japanese mobile game developed by Liber Entertainment. The game was released on January 27, 2017, in Japan. It was given a worldwide English release on October 23, 2019, which later ended services in November 2021. The success of the game led to several adaptations for the franchise, including stage plays, an anime series, and 2 live action movies.

== Plot ==
Mankai Company is a theatre company for actors, who are split into four troupes and named after the four seasons: Spring, Summer, Autumn and Winter. Having incurred a huge debt over the years after the sudden disappearance of its former director, Mankai Company is at the risk of shutting down. The player character joins as the director of the theatre company in order to save it from being shut down by repaying the debt with a one-year time limit.

== Characters ==
=== Spring ===
Sakuya Sakuma (佐久間 咲也, Sakuma Sakuya)
Voiced by: Kōdai Sakai (Japanese); Greg Ayres (English)
Masumi Usui (碓氷 真澄, Usui Masumi)
Voiced by: Yusuke Shirai (Japanese); Eric Rolon (English)
Tsuzuru Minagi (皆木 綴, Minagi Tsuzuru)
Voiced by: Koutaro Nishiyama (Japanese); Jessie James Grelle (English)
Itaru Chigasaki (茅ヶ崎 至, Chigasaki Itaru)
Voiced by: Shintaro Asanuma (Japanese); Aaron Roberts (English)
Citron (シトロン, Shitoron)
Voiced by: Masashi Igarashi (Japanese); Ricco Fajardo (English)
Chikage Utsuki (卯木 千景, Utsuki Chikage)
Voiced by: Wataru Hatano (Japanese); Anthony Bowling (English)

=== Summer ===
Tenma Sumeragi (皇 天馬, Sumeragi Tenma)
Voiced by: Takuya Eguchi (Japanese); Eric Vale (English)
Yuki Rurikawa (瑠璃川 幸, Rurikawa Yuki)
Voiced by: Shun'ichi Toki (Japanese); Brandon McInnis (English)
Muku Sakisaka (向坂 椋, Sakisaka Muku)
Voiced by: Yoshitaka Yamaya (Japanese); Stephen Fu (English)
Misumi Ikaruga (斑鳩 三角, Ikaruga Misumi)
Voiced by: Daisuke Hirose (Japanese); Nazeeh Tarsha (English)
Kazunari Miyoshi (三好 一成, Miyoshi Kazunari)
Voiced by: Ren Ozawa (2017-2020), Tomoru Akazawa (2020-present) (Japanese); Kyle Phillips (English)
Kumon Hyodo (兵頭 九門, Hyōdō Kumon)
Voiced by: Tasuku Hatanaka (Japanese); Grant Paulsen (English)

=== Autumn ===
Banri Settsu (摂津 万里, Settsu Banri)
Voiced by: Chiharu Sawashiro (Japanese); Daman Mills (English)
Juza Hyodo (兵頭 十座, Hyōdō Jūza)
Voiced by: Shunsuke Takeuchi (Japanese); Christopher Sabat (English)
Taichi Nanao (七尾 太一, Nanao Taichi)
Voiced by: Kento Hama (Japanese); Orion Pitts (English)
Omi Fushimi (伏見 臣, Fushimi Omi)
Voiced by: Kentarō Kumagai (Japanese); Jonah Scott (English)
Sakyo Furuichi (古市 左京, Furuichi Sakyō)
Voiced by: Yoichi Jose (Japanese); Christopher Wenkamp (English)
Azami Izumida (泉田 莇, Izumida Azami)
Voiced by: Seiya Konishi (Japanese); Zeno Robinson (English)

=== Winter ===
Tsumugi Tsukioka (月岡 紬, Tsukioka Tsumugi)
Voiced by: Atsushi Tamaru (Japanese); Matt Shipman (English)
Tasuku Takato (高遠 丞, Takatō Tasuku)
Voiced by: Takuya Satō (Japanese); Robert McCollum (English)
Hisoka Mikage (御影 密, Mikage Hisoka)
Voiced by: Junta Terashima (Japanese); Howard Wang (English)
Homare Arisugawa (有栖川 誉, Arisugawa Homare)
Voiced by: Toshiyuki Toyonaga (Japanese); Brendan Blaber (English)
Azuma Yukishiro (雪白 東, Yukishiro Azuma)
Voiced by: Tetsuya Kakihara (Japanese); John Burgmeier (English)
Guy (ガイ, Gai)
Voiced by: Satoshi Hino

=== Other characters ===
Izumi Tachibana (立花 いづみ, Tachibana Izumi)
Voiced by: Kaori Nazuka (Japanese); Monica Rial (English) (anime)

== Media ==
=== Game ===
A3! was launched for the iOS and Android on January 27, 2017. In June 2018 Cybird licensed the game for English release, and the English version was later released on October 23, 2019. On September 21, 2021, Cybird announced that the English version of the game will no longer be updated past events taking place in late October and early November.

On December 18, 2020, Liber Entertainment announced that Ren Ozawa's voice will be removed from the game following his domestic abuse allegations. On December 25, 2020, he was replaced by Tomoru Akazawa, who had portrayed Kazunari in the stage plays.

=== Music ===
The music production for the game included artists such as Masayoshi Ōishi, Yuki Kimura, Hige Driver, R.O.N, Elements Garden member Asuka Oda, Ryōta Suemasu, Takeyuki Tonegawa, Round Table member Katsutoshi Kitagawa, Yuyoyuppe, and Tweedees member Reiji Okii. The music is published by Pony Canyon.

=== Stage plays ===
A series of stage plays titled Mankai Stage A3! has been running since 2018. The first stage play, Mankai Stage A3! Spring & Summer 2018, ran from June 28 to July 8, 2018, in Tokyo and July 13 to July 16, 2018, in Kyoto, before returning to Tokyo for another run from October 26 to November 4, 2018. The Spring and Summer shows were alternated on a rotational schedule. The second stage play, Mankai Stage A3! Autumn & Winter 2019, ran from January 31 to February 11, 2019, in Tokyo, February 23–24, 2019 in Yamaguchi, and February 27 to March 3, 2019, in Osaka, before returning to Tokyo from March 15 to March 24, 2019, for a final run.

After the first two-stage plays, the production company produced new shows with full runs for each troupe. Mankai Stage A3! Spring 2019 ran from April to June 2019, while the fourth stage play, Mankai Stage A3! Summer 2019, ran from August to September 2019. Mankai Stage A3! Autumn 2020 ran from January to March 2020, while Mankai Stage A3! Winter 2020 is scheduled to run from April to June 2020.

In addition to the stage plays, the cast of Mankai Stage A3! hosted their own radio program, Mankai Stage A3! Radio, which began broadcast on October 6, 2018, on Nippon Broadcasting System. The cast has also participated in Avex's Stage Fes concerts with other 2.5D musical acts. Their first solo concert, Four Seasons Live 2020, took place in September 2020.

Mankai Stage A3! has endorsed brands such as Utena and Orangina.

=== Anime ===
A television anime adaptation was announced in February 2019, with Keisuke Shinohara directing, and Masayuki Sakoi acting as series director, featuring Naoki Hayashi writing the scripts. Masaru Yokoyama and Kana Hashiguchi are composing the music. The series is animated by P.A. Works and Studio 3Hz. The anime adaptation is split into two parts, with A3! Season Spring & Summer planned to air from January to March 2020 and A3! Season Autumn & Winter from July to September 2020. Funimation acquired distribution rights to the series outside of Asia, and streamed the show as it aired in Japan. Muse Communication also acquired the distribution rights for the series in Southeast Asia and South Asia, and is streaming it on their Muse Asia YouTube channel and iQIYI.

A3! Season Spring & Summer began on January 14, 2020, and the theme song for the series is "Act! Addict! Actors!" Episode 4 was initially announced to have been delayed "due to production issues" and then subsequently for another two weeks, before the official anime production announced that the entire series would be rebroadcast from the beginning on April 6, 2020, and aired until June 22, 2020. A3! Season Autumn & Winter was delayed to air from October 13 to December 29, 2020, due to the effects of the COVID-19 pandemic. Masayuki Sakoi took over full directing responsibilities for A3! Season Autumn & Winter, and Nozomi Nagatomo took over character designing from Mariko Komatsu. Kōhei Honda also replaced Hiroko Tanabe as art director.

=== Live-action films ===
Two movie adaptations of the stage plays were announced in March 2021, with most of the play's original cast to reprise their roles. The first film, Mankai Movie A3! Spring & Summer, was released on December 3, 2021, while the second film, Mankai Movie A3! Autumn & Winter is slated for a March 4, 2022, release.

== Reception ==
A3! was downloaded by 800,000 users within the first three days of the original Japanese release, with 300,000 of the registrations taking place on the day of release. By February 21, 2017, the game had a cumulative total of 2 million downloads. A3! was nominated for the Google Play Best of 2017.
