= Masayuki Sakoi =

Japanese Storyboard Artist and Director

Masayuki Sakoi (迫井 政行, Sakoi Masayuki; born June 29, 1974) is a Japanese animator, storyboard artist, and director from Kagoshima Prefecture. He is a professor in the department of design at Sapporo City University in Hokkaido, Japan.

== Anime involved in ==
- A3!: Series Director
- Aishiteruze Baby: Episode Director (ep 19)
- BECK: Mongolian Chop Squad: Key Animation (ep 10)
- Cautious Hero: The Hero Is Overpowered but Overly Cautious: Director
- Celestial Method: Director
- Code:Breaker: Storyboard (eps 4, 9, 11), Episode Director (eps 1, 4, 9, 12), Assistant Director
- Comic Party: In-Between Animation (eps 3, 7, 12)
- Fullmetal Alchemist: Brotherhood: Storyboard (ep 7)
- Hand Maid May: In-Between Animation (ep 4)
- Heroman: Episode Director (eps 5, 8)
- Hit o Nerae!: Unit Director (eps 1, 5)
- I My Me! Strawberry Eggs: Key Animation (ep 3)
- Kamen no Maid Guy: Director, Storyboard (eps 1, 12)
- Kurau: Phantom Memory: Technical director (ep 16)
- Lycoris Recoil: Friends are thieves of time: Storyboard/Technical Director (ep 6)
- Matoi the Sacred Slayer: Director
- Needless: Director, Storyboard (ep 1, 6, 10, 21, 24), Episode Director (ep 24)
- Noragami: Storyboard (ep 8)
- Neppu Kairiku Bushi Road: Director
- Piano: The Melody of a Young Girl's Heart: Key Animation (ep 5)
- Princess Resurrection: Director
- Rizelmine: Key Animation (ep 6, 21, 23, 24)
- Saint Beast ~Ikusen no Hiru to Yoru Hen ~: Director, Storyboard
- Sono Hanabira ni Kuchizuke wo: Anata to Koibito Tsunagi: Director, Storyboard, Episode Director
- Spice and Wolf: Episode Director (ep 4), Unit Director (OP)
- Strawberry Panic!: Director, Storyboard (ep 1, 4, 26), Episode Director (ep 26)
- Sword Art Online Alternative Gun Gale Online: Director
- The Marginal Service: Director
- The Story of Saiunkoku: Episode Director (ep 35)
- Wolverine: Storyboard (ED; eps 2, 10), Episode Director (ED; eps 2, 8)
