= Tomomi Jiena Sumi =

Japanese voice actress and singer

- 鷲見 友美 ジェナ
- Born: September 5, 1994 (age 32); Kyoto Prefecture, Japan
- Years active: 2013-present
- Agent: Wint
- Notable work: Kemurikusa as Rina; Hatsune Miku: Colorful Stage! as An Shiraishi; D4DJ as Elsie

Tomomi Jiena Sumi (鷲見 友美 ジェナ, Sumi Tomomi Jena; born September 5, 1994) is a Japanese voice actress, actress, and singer from Kyoto Prefecture who is affiliated with Wint. She began her career in 2013 as a member of the idol group Kamen Rider Girls. She made her debut as a voice actress in 2017, and in 2019 she voiced the role Rina in the anime series Kemurikusa. She is also known for her role as An Shiraishi in the mobile game Hatsune Miku: Colorful Stage!.

== Biography ==
Sumi was born in Kyoto Prefecture on September 5, 1994, to a Japanese father and a Filipina mother. She grew up in Kyoto Prefecture, where she stayed until she moved to Tokyo during high school exam season. She often visited the Philippines during school breaks, and spent a year studying English in Cebu during high school.

Sumi grew up being a fan of anime and manga, watching Cardcaptor Sakura as well as reading Weekly Young Jump manga such as One Piece, Naruto, Gintama, and Bleach. She grew up watching Jackie Chan films with her father, with her admiration for Chan helping inspire her to become an actress. She particularly associated Chan with Hiroya Ishimaru, a voice actor who often dubbed Chan's roles. During her visits to the Philippines, she often stayed at home watching Disney Channel, noting that it broadcast in English, in contrast to its Japanese equivalent which broadcast in Japanese. The contrast between Japanese and English-language versions of Disney Channel, along with her becoming a fan of actresses such as Miley Cyrus and Vanessa Hudgens, inspired her desire to become a voice actress.

Sumi's entertainment activities began in October 2013 when she became a member of the idol group Kamen Rider Girls. In 2016, she participated in a voice acting audition held by the entertainment group Avex Inc. and the livestreaming service Showroom, where she became one of the finalists. The following year, she made her debut as a voice actress, portraying the character Mao Kozuki in the mobile game Schoolgirl Strikers: Twinkle Melodies. She also won an audition to voice a character in the video game Phantom of the Kill, leading to her being cast as Almas. In 2019, she played her first anime role as Rina in the television series Kemurikusa. In 2020, she played An Shiraishi in the mobile game Hatsune Miku: Colorful Stage!, also reprising the role in the 2022 anime series Petit Seka and the 2025 film Colorful Stage! The Movie: A Miku Who Can't Sing. In 2022 she was cast as the character Elsie in the mixed-media project D4DJ, also becoming a member of the in-universe group Abyssmare.

Outside of voice acting, Sumi is also active in screen acting, appearing as Masako Suzuka/Kamen Rider Sylphy in the 2020 net series Gaim Gaiden: Kamen Rider Gridon VS Kamen Rider Bravo. She also works as a gravure model, making her swimsuit debut in the September 1, 2025, issue of Weekly Playboy. She has released two digital-only photo books: Sweet Time Journey (2025) and Sun Turns to Joy (2026).

Originally affiliated with MIT Artists, Sumi joined Fractal Studio in October 2020. She was later affiliated with Remax until August 2024. A student of Megumi Ogata's private school Team BareboAt, she was part of their March 2021 performance.

Sumi has an older sister. She speaks Kyōto-ben.

== Filmography ==
=== Anime ===
2019

- Kemurikusa, Rina

2022

- BanG Dream! Poppin'Dream!, cabin attendant
- Fuuto PI, girl

2023

- BanG Dream! It's MyGO!!!!!, Anon's Roommate
- Petit Seka, An Shiraishi

2025

- Colorful Stage! The Movie: A Miku Who Can't Sing, An Shiraishi

=== Video games ===
2017

- Schoolgirl Strikers: Twinkle Melodies, Mao Kozuki
- Phantom of the Kill, Almas

2020

- Hatsune Miku: Colorful Stage!, An Shiraishi

2022

- D4DJ, Elsie

2023

- Blue Archive, Ichika Nakamasa
- Touhou Gensou Eclipse, Alice Margatroid
- Reverse: 1999, TTT

=== Live action ===
2020-2023

- Gaim Gaiden: Kamen Rider Gridon VS Kamen Rider Bravo, Masako Suzuka/Kamen Rider Sylphy
- Kamen Rider Gotchard, Mai

== Works ==
- Sweet Time Journey (2025)
- Sun Turns to Joy (2026)
