= Kamen Rider Girls =

Japanese idol group

- Origin: Japan
- Genres: J-Pop
- Years active: 2010-Present
- Labels: Avex Entertainment (former), Avex Trax
- Members: Hitomi Isaka; Chisato Akita; Tomomi Jiena Sumi
- Past members: Yurika Hirokawa; Kaori Nagura; Nao Yasuda; Erica Yoshizumi; Mitsuki Endo; Ayako Kuroda
- Website: www.kamenridergirls.jp

Kamen Rider Girls (仮面ライダーGirls, Kamen Raidā Gāruzu) are an idol group developed by Avex Trax and Ishimori Productions to commemorate the Kamen Rider Series' 40th anniversary in 2011. Each of the group's current members represent one of the protagonists of the Kamen Rider Series. The group made their premiere at an event featuring members of Columbia Music Entertainment's Project.R group, the musical collaboration who provides music for the Super Sentai series. The group's debut songs were "Koi no Rider Kick" (恋のライダーキック, Koi no Raidā Kikku; "Love's Rider Kick") and "Heart no Henshin Belt" (♡（ハート）の変身ベルト, Hāto no Henshin Beruto; "The Heart's Transformation Belt"). The group's debut songs were played on the DJ HURRY KENN Ride the Groove Internet radio program, the successor to the Wind Wave radio programs from the Kamen Rider W series. The group's debut single is "Let's Go RiderKick 2011", serving as the theme song for OOO, Den-O, All Riders: Let's Go Kamen Riders with "Koi no Rider Kick" and "Heart no Henshin Belt" as the single's B-sides. A second single titled "KAMEN RIDER V3" was released on August 3, 2011, with the PV having a cameo by Hiroshi Tanahashi.

== Members ==
- Hitomi Isaka (井坂 仁美, Isaka Hitomi): Kamen Rider OOO; November 2010–present
- Chisato Akita (秋田 知里, Akita Chisato): Kamen Rider Wizard; September 2012–present
- Tomomi Jiena Sumi (鷲見 友美 ジェナ, Sumi Tomomi Jena): Kamen Rider Gaim; October 2013–present

=== Former Members ===
- Yurika Hirokawa (廣川 由里香, Hirokawa Yurika): Kamen Rider Ryuki; November 2010-graduated December 2011
- Kaori Nagura (名倉 かおり, Nagura Kaori): Kamen Rider Kiva; November 2010-graduated April 2015
- Nao Yasuda (安田 奈央, Yasuda Nao): Kamen Rider Blade; November 2010-graduated January 2016
- Erica Yoshizumi (吉住 絵里加, Yoshizumi Erika): Kamen Rider Den-O; November 2010-graduated January 2016
- Mitsuki Endo (遠藤 三貴, Endō Mitsuki): Kamen Rider Fourze; November 2011–graduated March 2017
- Ayako Kuroda (黒田 綾子, Kuroda Ayako): Kamen Rider Faiz; November 2015–graduated March 2019

== Discography ==
=== Albums ===
- alteration - March 20, 2013
- exploded - March 19, 2014
- SUPER BEST - April 1, 2015
- invincible - August 23, 2017
- 030804-01 ("Zero One") - September 4, 2019
- starting point - May 20, 2021
- Re:incarnation - May 19, 2022

=== Singles ===
- Let's Go Rider Kick 2011
- KAMEN RIDER V3
- "Saite" (咲いて, "Saite" "Blooming")
- Last Engage
- Just The Beginning
- Go Get'Em
- SSS ~Shock Shocker Shockest~
- E-X-A (Exciting × Attitude)
- Break The Shell
- UNLIMITED DRIVE
- Let's Try Together
- Next Stage
- Rush N' Crash/Movin'on
- Just You & Me
- Time Of Victory
- Build-Up
