= Taisho Otome Fairy Tale =

Japanese manga series

- First tankōbon volume cover, featuring Yuzuki Tachibana

大正処女御伽話 (Taishō Otome Otogibanashi)
- Genre: Historical; Romance
- Manga
- Written by: Sana Kirioka
- Published by: Shueisha
- English publisher: Shueisha (digital)
- Imprint: Jump Comics SQ.
- Magazine: Jump Square
- Original run: July 4, 2015 – September 4, 2017
- Volumes: 5
- Manga

Shōwa Otome Otogibanashi
- Written by: Sana Kirioka
- Published by: Shueisha
- Imprint: Jump Comics+
- Magazine: Shōnen Jump+
- Original run: August 21, 2018 – May 12, 2020
- Volumes: 5
- Manga

Taishō Otome Otogibanashi: Pessimist no Shokutaku
- Written by: Sana Kirioka
- Published by: Shueisha
- Imprint: Jump Comics+
- Magazine: Shōnen Jump+
- Original run: July 3, 2021 – December 31, 2021
- Volumes: 2
- Anime television series
- Directed by: Jun Hatori
- Written by: Hiroko Fukuda
- Music by: Yasuharu Takanashi
- Studio: SynergySP
- Licensed by: Crunchyroll (streaming); SEA: Muse Communication
- Original network: TV Tokyo, TVO, BS11, AT-X
- Original run: October 9, 2021 – December 25, 2021
- Episodes: 12
- icon

Taisho Otome Fairy Tale (Japanese: 大正処女御伽話, Hepburn: Taishō Otome Otogibanashi), also known as Taisho Girl Fairy Tale, is a Japanese manga series written and illustrated by Sana Kirioka. It was serialized in Shueisha's shōnen manga magazine Jump Square from July 2015 to September 2017, with its chapters collected in five tankōbon volumes. An anime television series adaptation by SynergySP aired from October to December 2021.

== Plot ==
It is late 1921, the 10th year of the Taishō era. Tamahiko Shima, second son of the wealthy Shima family, has his life turned upside-down after his right arm is paralyzed in a car accident that also claims the life of his mother. Now seen as worthless to his calculating father's long-term plans for his business empire, his family treats him as "dead". But since it would bring shame to the family were they to disown him outright, he instead finds himself shunted off to a villa in the mountains of Chiba, out of public view. Though he quickly resigns himself to the idea that he will die alone and forgotten, one snowy December night a girl appears at his doorstep and announces that she is there to be his live-in caretaker, and when she is old enough, his bride. The girl, named Yuzuki Tachibana, or "Yuzu" for short, was purchased from her impoverished home by Tamahiko's father, and while she too finds herself uprooted from her home and family, she throws herself into her new role with gusto.

Tamahiko is initially extremely cynical and depressed due to his exile, and Yuzuki's irrepressibly sunny disposition grates on his nerves at first, but her presence gradually helps brighten his mood. In time, Tamahiko and Yuzuki fall in love. In 1922, Tamahiko's younger sister, Tamako, visits the couple, and, though initially cold, warms up to Yuzuki. They also meet Ryō Atsumi, the older sister and caretaker of a number of younger siblings, who teases, picks on and steals from Tamahiko. However, she grows close to him and Yuzuki, and Tamahiko helps her younger siblings with school.

In 1923, Yuzuki and one of Ryō's brothers, Ryotaro, leave for Tokyo—the former to see her friend from school, and the latter to pursue an apprenticeship. However, they are caught up in the 1923 Great Kantō earthquake, leading Tamahiko and Ryō to walk to Tokyo, with Tamahiko leaving his house open as a temporary shelter for the affected population in his town. Tamahiko finds Yuzuki, bringing her to a temporary hospital run by his estranged uncle. After the earthquake, the famous singer Kotori Shiratori visits Chiba and plays a show with Yuzuki and Ryō attending. Later on, Tamahiko returns to school, passing the entrance exams and making friends with Kotori's twin brother, Hakaru. Kotori visits Yuzuki and Tamahiko and asks them about love to support her songwriting.

Yuzuki suddenly leaves one day, and Tamahiko falls back into his depressed state. It is revealed that the heir to the Shima family, Tamaki, has died, and Tamahiko, despite being previously ostracized, is invited back into the family to serve as heir. As a result, Yuzuki is assigned to become the wife of Tamahiko's brother Tamao. Tamahiko goes back to Tokyo, gets Yuzuki back, and cuts ties with his father, with Tamako and Tamao following him, leaving only the oldest sister, Tamayo, to succeed the Shima family. In preparation for their wedding, Tamahiko and Yuzuki visit Yuzuki's family in Iwate. Eventually, Tamahiko takes Yuzuki's last name, Tachibana, and becomes a teacher. Tamao and Tamako are adopted by their uncle.

== Characters ==
=== Taisho Otome Fairy Tale ===
Tamahiko Shima (志磨 珠彦, Shima Tamahiko)
Voiced by: Yūsuke Kobayashi, Aya Yamane (young) (Japanese); Ben Balmaceda, (English) Daisy Guevara (young)
Tamahiko Shima, the second son of a prominent Tokyo family, becomes disabled in a car accident that kills his mother. Deemed useless by his father, he is exiled to their Chiba mountain villa, where he sinks into despair. His life changes when Yuzuki enters his world, helping him overcome his self-hatred. Though deeply in love, he resolves to improve himself before proposing. When forced to choose between inheriting his family's legacy or keeping Yuzuki after his brother's death, he abandons his lineage to marry her. The couple raises three children while Tamahiko pursues his talent for teaching, eventually becoming an elementary school educator.
Yuzuki Tachibana (立花 夕月, Tachibana Yuzuki)
Voiced by: Saya Aizawa (Japanese); Lisa Reimold (English)
Yuzuki, the fourteen-year-old otome (maiden) of the story, is sold by her impoverished family to the Shima household for ¥10,000 to serve as Tamahiko's caretaker and intended bride. Her relentless optimism allows her to see past Tamahiko's bitterness to his inherent kindness. Through unwavering devotion, she gradually draws him out of isolation. Developing genuine affection, she resolves to marry him despite his self-doubts. When the Shima family attempts to separate them to reclaim Tamahiko as heir, the couple elopes. They raise three children in modest but contented circumstances.
Tamako Shima (志磨 珠子, Shima Tamako)
Voiced by: Yume Miyamoto (Japanese); Elizabeth Quedenfeld (English)
Tamako is Tamahiko's younger sister and the youngest of the Shima children. She is bratty and domineering thanks to her luxurious upbringing, but underneath lies a sensitive and caring child. Her lonely childhood made her unable to trust others. Her time at her brother's villa allows her to form a true bond with him and they reconcile. She also bonds with Yuzuki, seeing her as an older sister. Changed by the couple, she decides to become a doctor and moves in with her uncle. Although annoyed by Hakaru, she grows close to him and marries him.
Ryō Atsumi (渥美 綾, Atsumi Ryō)
Voiced by: Chika Anzai (Japanese); Shara Kirby (English)
An eighteen year old delinquent girl who lives in a nearby town. Living with three younger brothers, she picks pockets to provide for them and shields them from their abusive father, who once tried to sell her into prostitution. She meets Tamahiko while robbing his estate, but they become friendlier when he begins tutoring her brothers. She later develops feelings for him but doesn't pursue them due to his love for Yuzuki. She initially hates Yuzuki for being happy despite being sold for money, but comes to respect her positivity and resilience.
Kotori Shiratori (白鳥 ことり, Shiratori Kotori)
Voiced by: Ayasa Itō (Japanese); Megan Shipman (English)
A famous singer, whom Yuzuki and Tamako, and later Tamahiko, are fans of. After watching her perform for the locals, she befriends the three. She also seeks advice from Yuzuki in writing a love song.
Hakaru Shiratori (白鳥 策, Shiratori Hakaru)
Voiced by: Shun'ichi Toki (Japanese); Y. Chang, Brittany Lauda (young) (English)
Kotori's twin brother. He befriends Tamahiko after he returns to high school. He used to be a musician like his sister but quit after battling an illness for three years. He becomes acquainted with Tamako when the two start volunteering at her uncle's hospital. They later form a relationship and get married.
Tamayoshi Shima (志磨 珠義, Shima Tamayoshi)
Voiced by: Shunsuke Sakuya (Japanese); Daman Mills (English)
Father of Tamahiko, Tamako, Tamaki, Tamayo and Tamao. A ruthless man, he is indifferent towards his family and sees money and privilege as the ultimate success. His cruelty is such that he cast Tamahiko off for his disability and had him declared dead, he allows Tamayo to torture her siblings, and he shows no concern for his children's well being if it doesn't benefit him.
Tamaki Shima (志磨 珠樹, Shima Tamaki)
Voiced by: Fumiya Imai (Japanese); Khoi Dao (English)
Eldest child of the Shima family, and older brother of Tamahiko, Tamako, Tamayo, and Tamako. He is injured in the Great Kanto Earthquake but later dies after being poisoned by Tamayo.
Tamayo Shima (志磨 珠代, Shima Tamayo)
Voiced by: Eri Kitamura (Japanese); Marcy Edwards (English)
The second eldest child of the Shima family. She is just as ruthless as her father to where she takes delight in stealing and or killing anything that brings happiness to others. She is particularly cruel to her siblings, who fear her. She desires nothing more than to have her father's attention all to herself and succeed him as the new head of the family at any cost. She adopts Jintaro Shima but he runs away due to her abuse and turns her over to the police for her crimes. She contracts turberculosis and dies while awaiting trial.
Tamao Shima (志磨 珠央, Shima Tamao)
Voiced by: Yoshitaka Yamaya (Japanese); Calvin Joyal (English)
The fourth child of the Shima children. However he is revealed to be illegitimate son of Tamasuke Shima and Touko Shima. He initially hates Tamahiko for surviving the accident that killed their mother but they later reconcile. He later leaves the Shima name behind and moves in with his birth father in preparation of taking over his hospital.
Stray cat (野良猫, Nora neko)
Voiced by: Yūna Mimura (Japanese); Kent Williams (English)
A feline that lives on Tamahiko's estate. Yuzu calls the cat "Haru".
Midori (美鳥)
Voiced by: Sayumi Suzushiro (Japanese); Kristen McGuire (English)
Yuzuki's best friend from her all girls school before she was sold. The two kept in touch by exchanging letters. Yuzuki visits her in Tokyo when Midori writes she is getting married due to her pregnancy.
Ryōtarō Atsumi (渥美 綾太郎, Atsumi Ryōtarō)
Voiced by: Yūna Mimura (Japanese); Morgan Lea (English)
The oldest of Ryō's younger brothers. Since their father is an abusive alcoholic, he tries to look out for his siblings. He is especially protective of Ryō because he knows how far she goes to provide for the family. He eventually leaves to become a laborer in Tokyo.
Yamato Atsumi (渥美 ヤマト, Atsumi Yamato)
Voiced by: Mari Hino (Japanese); Francesca Calo (English)
One of Ryo's younger brothers.
Keita Atsumi (渥美 ケイタ, Atsumi Keita)
Voiced by: Nao Ojika (Japanese); Jenny Yokobori (English)
One of Ryo's younger brothers.
Tamasuke Manabe (曲直部 珠介, Manabe Tamasuke)
Voiced by: Wataru Hatano (Japanese); Christopher Wehkamp (English)
Tamahiko's paternal uncle. He left the Shima family after Tamayoshi stole his lover and forced her to marry him. He is a doctor and is married to an unnamed woman, whose surname he adopted. He is supportive of Tamahiko and Tamako, and later takes Tamao in when he learns he is his biological son.
Yuzuki's mother (立花 お母さん, Tachibana okāsan)
Voiced by: Ayumi Tsunematsu (Japanese); Marcy Edwards (English)
Yuzuki's mother is a kind woman who worried after Yuzuki was bought by the Shima family to support the family. She later becomes pregnant before Yuzuki reunites with her parents and introduces them to Tamahiko.

=== Shōwa Otome Otogibanashi ===
Jintaro Shima (志磨 仁太郎, Shima Jintarō)
A distant member of the Shima family and Tamayo's adoptive son. After being sent away by his parents and abused by Tamayo, Jintaro returns to his hometown to see his childhood friend and love, Tokoyo, before attempting suicide. However, he falls back in love with her, they fake their deaths to escape from Tamayo, and turn Tamayo over to the police. The pair get married and open their own parlor house before Jintaro is drafted into WWII. He is presumed to have been killed in combat but survives. Jintaro and Tokoyo later have a son.
Tokoyo Kurosaki (黒咲 常世, Kurosaki Tokoyo)
Jintaro's childhood friend and lover. Due to being abused by her stepmother, she becomes dependent on Jintaro to the point she prefers death if she can't be with him. She works hard to regain his heart and the two run away to escape from Tamayo. Tokoyo contracts turberculosis. She marries Jintaro before he is drafted into WWII and she almost commits suicide when he is presumed dead but is overjoyed when she learns he is alive. They later have a son.
Liselotte Meggendorfer (リーゼロッテ・メッゲンドルファー, Meggendorufā Rīzerotte)
The daughter of Jintaro's patron. She is infatuated with him and sees Tokoyo as a rival for his attention. Although she accepts Jintaro will never reciprocate her feelings, she believes her feelings will never change.
Tsukihiko Tachibana (立花 月彦, Tachibana Tsukihiko)
Tamahiko and Yuzuki's son and first child. He resembles his father. He is a mature and pleasant boy.
Ritsu (りつ, Ritsu)
A miko at the shrine of the Arima Onsen Inn Tokoyo and Jintaro live and work at. She becomes friends with Tokoyo and despises men. She is secretly in love with Tokoyo.

== Media ==
=== Manga ===
Written and illustrated by Sana Kirioka, Taisho Otome Fairy Tale was serialized in Shueisha's shōnen manga magazine Jump Square from July 4, 2015, to September 4, 2017. Shueisha collected its chapters in five tankōbon volumes, released from February 4, 2016, to October 4, 2017. Shueisha began publishing the manga in English, under the title Taisho Girl Fairy Tale, on its Manga Million digital platform in 2026.

A sequel, titled Shōwa Otome Fairy Tale (昭和オトメ御伽話, Shōwa Otome Otogibanashi), was serialized on Shueisha's Shōnen Jump+ online magazine from August 21, 2018, to May 12, 2020. Shueisha collected its chapters in five tankōbon volumes, released from January 4, 2019, to July 3, 2020.

A spin-off series, titled Taishō Otome Otogibanashi: Pessimist no Shokutaku (大正処女御伽話―厭世家ノ食卓―, Taishō Otome Otogibanashi: Peshimisuto no Shokutaku; "Taisho Otome Fairy Tale: A Pessimist's Dining Table"), was serialized on Shōnen Jump+ from July 3 to December 31, 2021. Shueisha collected its chapters in two volumes, released on October 4, 2021, and March 4, 2022.

==== Taisho Otome Fairy Tale ====
No.	Release date	ISBN
1	February 4, 2016	978-4-08-880593-1
Yuzuki Arrives in November (霜月、夕月来タル相月, Shimotsuki、Yuzuki、Kitaru); Memory of Spring on a Winter Night (秒冬ノ夜ノ春思ニ, Beutou no Yoru no Shunshi); 1.) Yuzuki, 2.) Nurse (一二夕月、二二看病, Ichi ni Yudzuki、Ni ni Kanbyou); A Tokyo Flower (花ノ東京ヘ, Hana no Toukyou e); Tamahiko Dies (珠彦死ス, Tamahiko Shisu); The Forests Flowing Streams and Spring-time Clouds (流水行雲春ノ森, Ryūsui Koūn Haru no Mori); The Black Lily's Daughter (黒百合の娘, Kuroyuri no Musume); Happiness Under the Moonlight (幸せは月明カリの下に, Shiawase wa Tsukiakari no Shita ni); Extras (番外編, Bangai-hen)
2	June 3, 2016	978-4-08-880725-6
Brother and Sister (兄ト妹, Ani to Imouto); September First (九月一日, Kugatsu Tsuitachi); Bad Girl (悪イ娘, Warui Musume); A Strange Love (変ハラヌ愛, Kawaranu Ai); December Thirty First (十二月三十一日, Jyūnigatsu San Jyū Ichinichi); Mr. Tamahiko (珠彦先生, Tamahiko-sensei); A Friend Writing From Afar (朋アリ遠方ヨリ手紙来ル, Tomo Ari Enpou Yori Tegami Kitaru); Midori and Yuzuki (美鳥ト夕月, Midori to Yudzuki); Spring Night, Starry World (春ノ夜 星ノ界, Haru no Yo Hoshi no Yo)
3	December 2, 2016	978-4-08-880833-8
September First −2 (九月一日−2, Kugatsu Tsuitachi −2); A Vivid Imagination (綾ナス想ヒ, Ayanasu Sou Hi); Reunion (再会, Saikai); Searching for Yuzuki (夕月ヲ求メテ, Yudzuki o Motomete); Yuzu's Story (ユヅ語リ, Yudzu Gatari); Resolute Eyes (確志ノ瞳, Kakushi no Hitomi); The Black Lily and a Spring Storm (春ノ嵐ト黒百合, Haru no Arashi to Kuroyuri)
4	May 2, 2017	978-4-08-881081-2
The Maidens of Autumn (秋ノ処女達, Aki no Shitometachi); September, Yuzuki and a Story (長月、夕月ト語ル, Nagatsuki、Yudzuki to Gataru); Believe Me; Tamako's Blues (珠子ノ憂鬱, Tamako no Yūtsu); Tamahiko Goes to School (珠彦 学校ヘ, Tamahiko Gakkou e); Yuzu's Guidance on Love (ユヅノ戀愛指南, Yudzu no Renai Shinan); Hakaru and Kotori (策トコトリ, Hakaru to Kotori); December Thirty First ② (十二月三十一日②, Jyūnigatsu San Jyū Ichinichi)
5	October 4, 2017	978-4-08-881160-4
The Fairy Tale's Curtain Call (御伽話ハ幕, Otogibanashi wa Maku); Pessimist's Die Twice (厭世家ハ二度死ヌ, Peshimisuto wa Nido Shi o); The Lifetime of Parents and Children (親子ハ一世, Oyako wa Isse); The Night Train Headed to Tohoku (東北行キ鉄道ノ夜, Touhoku Yuki Tetsudou no Yoru); Mother and Daughter (母ト娘, Haha to Musume); A Flowery Moonlit Night (花月夜, Hanadzuki Yo); A Brilliant Future (綾ナス未来, Ayanasu Mirai); The Day of a Spring Storm (春ノ嵐ノ日, Haru no Arashi no Hi); Mr. Tamahiko 2 (珠彦先生2, Tamahiko Sensei 2)

==== Shōwa Otome Fairy Tale ====
No.	Release date	ISBN
1	January 4, 2019	978-4-08-881706-4
The Trifoliate Orange Princess (カラタチノ姫, Karatachi no Hime); Three Year's of One's Life (三年ノ月日, Sannen no Tsukihi); The Princess and the Demon (姫ト悪魔, Hime to Akuma); A Creeping Demon (忍ビ込ンダ悪魔, Shinobikonda Akuma); The Princess' Transformation (変ワラズノ姫, Kawarazu no Hime); Jintaro Collapses (仁太郎倒レル, Jintarou Toareru); Jinta's Sincerity (真心ヲ仁太ニ, Magokoro o Jinta ni)
2	May 2, 2019	978-4-08-881819-1
Tamako's Pride (珠子ノ矜持, Tamako no Kyouji); Truth Extinguished by the Sound of Rainfall (雨音ニ消ユル真実, Amaoto ni Shou Yuru Shinjitsu); Do You Want to Become an Eternal Delinquent? (常世不良ニナル？, Tokoyo Furyou ni Naru？); If You Aspire to Do Good, Then You Must Not Do Any Evil (苟モ仁ニ志セバ悪シキコトナシ, Iyashikumo Jin ni Kokorozaseba Ashiki Koto Nashi); Jinta Doesn't Know (知ラナイ仁太, Shiranai Jinta); Jintaro's Story ① (仁太郎語リ①, Jintarou Katari ①); Jintaro's Story ② (仁太郎語リ②, Jintarou Katari ②); Come Here Mr. Demon (鬼サンコチラ, Oni-san Kochira); An Eternally Refined Woman (常世女ヲ磨ク, Tokoyo Onna o Migaku); Journey Through Childhood (幼キ道行, Asanaki Michiyuki)
3	October 4, 2019	978-4-08-882121-4
A Spring Storm (春ノ嵐, Haru no Arashi); For Whom the Bride Trains Herself (花嫁修業ハ誰ガ為ニ, Hanayomeshūgyou wa Dare ga Tame ni); Odd Jinta (オカシナ仁太, Okashi na Jinta); Flowers Bloom Even on Trampled Grass (踏マレタ草ニモ花ハ咲ク, Fumareta Kusa ni mo Hana wa Saku); Unrecognized Genius of the Trifoliate Orange Princess (伏龍鳳雛カラタチ姫, Fukuryū Housū Karatachi Hime); Birthday Party (オ誕生日会, Otanjoubikai); The Everlasting Darkness Continues① (続キユク常闇①, Tsudzukiyuku Tokoyami①); The Everlasting Darkness Continues② (続キユク常闇①, Tsudzukiyuku Tokoyami②); Shima's Cinema of Memories (思ヒ出ノ志磨キネマ, Omohida no Shima Kinema); Unending Everlasting Darkness (終ワラナイ常闇, Owaranai Tokoyami); Suicide Note (遺書, Isho); The Camellia Does Not Know (サザンカハ知ラナイ, Sazanka wa Shiranai)
4	March 4, 2020	978-4-08-882242-6
A New Everyday (新シキ日々, Atarashiki Bibi); Unseen Inhabitant (見エナイ住人, Mienai Jūnin); That Which Bloomed in My Heart (私ノ心ニ咲イタモノ, Watashi no Kokoro ni Saita Mono); Turmoil in the Guest House ① (民宿騒動①, Minshuku Soudou①); Turmoil in the Guest House ② (民宿騒動②, Minshuku Soudou②); Turmoil in the Guest House ③ (民宿騒動③, Minshuku Soudou③); The Camellia Again (サザンカ再ビ, Sazanka Futatabi); The Inseparable Two (形影一如ナ二人, Keieiichinyo na Futari); Love's Transformation (変ワラズノ愛, Kawarazu no Ai); The Red Flower (赤イ花, Akai Hana); Arima, Starry Night Sky (有馬、星空ノ夜, Arima、Hoshizora no Yoru)
5	July 3, 2020	978-4-08-882399-7
Shining Determination (輝ク決意, Kagayaku Ketsui); The Fairy Tale's Curtain Call (御伽話ノ幕ハ, Otogibanashi wa Maku); Seeing Death (死ヲ見ツメテ, Shi o Mitsumete); What I Truly Want to Say (本当ニ云イタイコト, Hontou ni Yuitai Koto); Time to Die Together (死ヌ時ハ一緒, Shinu Toki wa Issho); Jinta Returns (仁太帰ル, Jinta Kaeru); Eternal Story (常世語リ, Tokoyo Gatari); The Fairy Tale of Eternity (常世ノ御伽話, Tokoyo no Otogibanashi); The Continuing Fairy Tale (続キユク御伽話, Tsudzukiyuku Otogibanashi)

==== Taishō Otome Otogibanashi ====
No.	Release date	ISBN
1	October 4, 2021	978-4-08-882807-7
A Pessimist's Breakfast (厭世家ノ朝食, Peshimisuto no Choushoku); A Pessimist's Mochi Pounding (厭世家ノ餅ツキ, Peshimisuto no Mochitsuki); A Modern Katsu Rice Bowl (大正時代ノカツ井, Imadoki no Katsu Donburi); Tamahiko's Sandwich (珠子サンドヰッチ, Tamahiko Sandowicchi); Mr. Tamahiko and a Picnic (珠彦先生トピクニック, Tamahiko Sensei to Pikunikku); The Bad Daughter and Thriftiness (悪イ娘ト節約ト, Warui Musume to Setsuyaku to); Tamako and the Tea Party (珠子ノオ茶会, Tamako no Ochakai); The Pessimist's Friend (厭世家ノ友達, Peshimisuto no Tomodachi); Tapioca Jelly Pessimist (番外編 タピオカヂェリート厭世家, Bangai-hen Tapioka Peshimisuto); Pessimist's Ghost Story (番外編 ―厭世家ノ怪談―, Bangai-hen ―Peshimisuto no Kaidan―)
2	March 4, 2022	978-4-08-882882-4

=== Anime ===
On December 20, 2020, at the Jump Festa '21 online event, it was announced that the series would receive an anime television series adaptation by SynergySP. It is directed by Jun Hatori, with scripts written by Hiroko Fukuda and Mayu Watanabe designing the characters. Yasuharu Takanashi is composing the series' music. It aired from October 9 to December 25, 2021, on TV Tokyo, TVO, BS11, and AT-X. (Note: TV Tokyo lists the series premiere at 25:53 on October 8, 2021, which is effectively 1:53 a.m. JST on October 9.) Garnidelia performed the opening theme "Otome no Kokoroe" (オトメの心得; 'A Maiden's Experience'), while Shun'ichi Toki performed the ending theme "Magokoro ni Kanade" (真心に奏; 'Playing Music Sincerely'). Ayasa Itō performed the ending theme "Koi no Uta" (戀ノ歌; 'A Song of Love') of episode 12. Funimation streamed the series while Muse Communication licensed it in Southeast Asia.

==== Episodes ====
No.	Title	Directed by (Note: Information is taken from the ending credits of each episode.)	Written by	Storyboarded by	Original release date
1	"Yuzuki Arrives"; Transliteration: "Yuzuki Kitaru" (Japanese: 夕月 来タル)	Takatoshi Suzuki	Hiroko Fukuda	Jun Hatori	October 9, 2021
New Year's Eve in 1921, Tamahiko lays in bed in his family's country villa in the mountains of Chiba, depressed over his situation. In the night, Yuzuki Tachibana arrives at the family villa saying she is now betrothed to Tamahiko due to a family debt owed by her family to the Shima family.
2	"Tamahiko Dies"; Transliteration: "Tamahiko Shisu" (Japanese: 珠彦 死ス)	Yoshiaki Okumura	Hiroko Fukuda	Kunihisa Sugishima	October 16, 2021
Early spring of 1922 arrives and Tamahiko continues to get used to one Yuzu. Tamahiko's father, Tamahiro, sends his son a letter announcing that two of Tamahiko's siblings have been given marriage prospects, and to preserve their chances, Tamahiro has declared his son dead to the family. This news causes Tamahiko to sink deeper into his depression and grow ill with a fever. As Yuzu attempts to comfort him, he soils her kimono giving him the desire to replace it. The couple take a trip to Tokyo to buy fabric for her and return to the family villa later. Tamahiko's sister, Tamako then arrives announcing she's intending to possibly move in.
3	"The Black Lily"; Transliteration: "Kuroyuri no Musume" (Japanese: 黒百合ノ娘)	Chihiro Kumano	Hiroko Fukuda	Jun Hatori	October 23, 2021
Tamako gets settled in with her brother and Yuzuki but still shows a cold demeanor towards the both of them. This begins to sink Tamahiko's mood again until Yuzuki takes him on a short walk to appreciate the beauty of the natural scenery around the home. Later in the night, a thunderstorm frightens Tamako to the point she accidentally loses bladder control and urinates on the floor. Yuzuki quickly helps her get cleaned up and agrees to spend the night with her to help her though the storm, where the two bond.
4	"Happiness Is Under the Moonlight"; Transliteration: "Shiawase wa Tsukiakari no Shita ni" (Japanese: 幸セハ月明カリノ下ニ)	Takatoshi Suzuki	Hiroko Fukuda	Kunihisa Sugishima	October 30, 2021
Yuzuki and Tamako bond further over some records by the famous singer, Shiratori Kotori. Later, Yuzuki falls ill from overworking herself leaving Tamako and Tamahiko to nurse her back to health. During the night, Tamahiko goes to check on Yuzuki, finding her struggling to breathe under some tightly wrapped bandages that were concealing her ample breasts. Tamako announces she'll be returning to school with the hopes of becoming a doctor in the future.
5	"September First"; Transliteration: "Kugatsu Tsuitachi" (Japanese: 九月一日)	Yoshiaki Okumura; Shūji Saitō	Hiroko Fukuda	Hiroyuki Ōshima	November 6, 2021
As September 1st arrives, Tamako leaves to stay with their uncle in Kobe to begin her studies in medicine. Later in the day, Tamahiko and Yuzuki go shopping in the village market where they're noticed by the mischievous pickpocket Ryo Atsumi. Later in the evening, Yuzuki presents a pressed flower bookmark for Tamahiko as a birthday present for him, the first he's ever received in his life. A loud crash startles the two of them, which prompts Tamahiko to investigate where he finds Ryo sitting in his room.
6	"The Bad Girl"; Transliteration: "Warui Musume" (Japanese: 悪イ娘)	Masamune Hirata	Hiroko Fukuda	Kunihisa Sugishima	November 13, 2021
Tamahiko tracks Ryo down to her home, only to find she's the oldest of three younger brothers and her thievery is due to the fact her father is an abusive alcoholic. The next day, Tamahiko again returns to Ryo's home to try to get back the bookmark she stole from him and Ryo agrees to return it if Tamahiko helps her younger brothers with their school work. Before Tamahiko is able to get it back, Ryo's father returns forcing him to quickly leave. The next day, Ryo arrives at Tamahiko's home but teases him, implying in front of Yuzu the two were having an illicit affair.
7	"Tamahiko-Sensei"; Transliteration: "Tamahiko-sensei" (Japanese: 珠彦先生)	Chihiro Kumano	Hiroko Fukuda	Ken'ichi Nishida	November 20, 2021
Tamahiko and Yuzuki are approached by Ryo's siblings and several kids from town seeking to be tutored again. While he was teaching them, Ryo comes to the estate, taking Yuzu away to cook a meal for the children. While they're alone, Ryo acknowledges Yuzu for enduring her attempt to drive her from Tamahiko. Inspired by tutoring the kids, Tamahiko writes a note for his father, asking to be allowed to return to school. On New Year's Eve, Yuzu reveals she is now old enough to legally marry, but Tamahiko says he wants to grow as a person before taking her as a wife. He does, however, impulsively kiss her in a romantic way. After another tutoring session with the kids, Ryo's younger brother Ryotaro says he is moving to work in Tokyo. That night, Ryo comes to Tamahiko's home saying that Ryotaro disappeared. Joining the search, Yuzu finds the boy and Tamahiko eases his fear of leaving his family, inspiring him to move forward. The following morning, he says goodbye to everyone happier than before, and boards a train for Tokyo.
8	"Tamahiko Goes to School"; Transliteration: "Tamahiko Gakkō e" (Japanese: 珠彦 学校ヘ)	Takatoshi Suzuki	Hiroko Fukuda	Jun Hatori	November 27, 2021
Tamako learns about Tamahiko's bid to return to school, so she puts him in touch with their uncle Tamasuke, who decides to sponsor him. While he studies to take a remedial exam, popular musician Kotori Shiratori comes to town for a performance. Despite not knowing her, Tamahiko takes a break from studying to go with Yuzu and the local kids, finding that he enjoys the young lady's songs. He later passes the exam and starts school again. and finds that Kotoro's twin brother Hakaru is transferring in at the same time. Tamahiko is unpopular with his classmates, with only Hakaru taking an interest in him, and the two get in trouble with a teacher. Having to do another assignment as punishment, Tamahiko takes Hakaru to his place and introduces him to Yuzuki, then lies to her about how his day went. Hakaru calls him out for it when they're alone, but acknowledges his desire to keep Yuzu happy. At dinner, Hakaru calls Tamahiko his friend and promises to return. True to his word, he later shows up with Kotori in tow, shocking Yuzuki.
9	"Hakaru and Kotori"; Transliteration: "Hakaru to Kotori" (Japanese: 策トコトリ)	Shūji Saitō	Hiroko Fukuda	Kunihisa Sugishima	December 4, 2021
The famous singer, Kotori arrives at Tamahiko's villa, tagging along with her brother, Hakaru. Kotori tells Yuzu that needs advice about love for a new song and asks to stay on the property and observe Tamahiko and Yuzu's daily routine. Kotori also talks about how Hakaru used to love playing and singing music, prompting Tamahiko to ask Hakaru about it. He reveals that he wanted to be a musician more than Kotori, but gave it up after he fell ill, breaking his promise to sing together with her. Tamahiko convinces him to try again, and he sings a duet with his sister as she debuts her love song.
10	"Yuzuki Goes to Tokyo"; Transliteration: "Yuzuki Tōkyō e Iku" (Japanese: 夕月 東京ヘ行ク)	Ken'ichi Nishida	Hiroko Fukuda	Ken'ichi Nishida	December 11, 2021
Yuzuki's old friend and classmate Midori announces that she is pregnant and moving to Kyushu with her fiancé. Since they may not get a chance to meet again, she asks Yuzuki to visit Tokyo. Tamahiko convinces her to make the trip, and she tasks Ryo with looking after Tamahiko. Yuzuki enjoys a few days with Midori, who is happy to learn her friend is being treated well. However, the day she is set return, The Great Kanto earthquake strikes. Seeing the village in ruins leaves Tamahiko distraught over the idea of losing Yuzuki. Tamahiko discovers a note and birthday present Yuzuki left behind for him and with a renewed spirit, sets out for Tokyo to find her.
11	"In Search of Yuzuki"; Transliteration: "Yuzuki o Motomete" (Japanese: 夕月ヲ求メテ)	Masamune Hirata	Hiroko Fukuda	Kunihisa Sugishima	December 18, 2021 (Note: This episode aired at 2:33 a.m. JST, 40 minutes after the original air time on TV Tokyo.)
Tamahiko and Ryo together walk the way to Tokyo to find Yuzuki and Ryotaro, coming across other places devastated by the earthquake. Upon their arrival in Tokyo, they're reunited with Tamako, who is helping in treating the injured alongside their uncle, Tamasuke Manabe. With Tamako joining the search, they find Midori but find out she and Yuzuki were separated in the chaos of the fire storms that erupted. Tamahiko comes close to giving up when two stray children who tried to steal his rice balls. As it turns out, the children were being cared for Yuzuki and together the three of them were sheltering in a ruined building. The children lead him to Yuzu, who is unconscious from a head injury, and Tamahiko carries her back to the medical camp.
12	"A Spring Storm"; Transliteration: "Haru no Arashi" (Japanese: 春ノ嵐)	Takatoshi Suzuki	Hiroko Fukuda	Jun Hatori	December 25, 2021 (Note: This episode aired at 2:08 a.m. JST, 15 minutes after the original air time on TV Tokyo.)
An unconscious Yuzuki contemplates her feelings for Tamahiko and how much he means to her, recalling how she gave herself up for the sake of her family to be his arranged bride. Yuzuki awakens and gives a long impassioned kiss to Tamahiko only to realize everyone was watching. Tamayoshi and his daughter Tamayo arrive to demand his estranged brother treat the eldest son, Tamaki. Manabe refuses to leave the other people in his care and refers Tamayoshi to another doctor instead. As Tamayoshi prepares to depart, Tamahiko expresses his happiness to see his father is safe. After spending time helping the relief efforts in Tokyo, Yuzu and Tamahiko return to the village. A month passes and things settle back to normal, so everyone gathers to give Tamahiko a late birthday party. Later on, Yuzu asks to be held and kissed more often; something she believes girls shouldn't think about. Tamahiko agrees, kissing her on the spot to mark the deepening of their relationship.

== Reception ==
In 2017, the manga was ranked seventh at the third Next Manga Awards in the print category.

The anime adaptation's first episode garnered mixed reviews from Anime News Network's staff during the Fall 2021 season previews. Richard Eisenbeis critiqued that a familiarity with the Taisho era is needed to enjoy the show and that Yuzuki's characteristics made her more of a plot device for Tamahiko's story, calling it "a perfectly watchable anime" that he had little reason to continue watching it. Nicholas Dupree understood the fluffy approach the show was going for but felt it lacked bite to explore its given topics and make its couple more romantically engaging beyond trite sentiment, concluding that: "Overall this is a perfectly pleasant experience, but one I'm not interested in repeating." James Beckett observed that while the show had "a decent period setting and a couple of chuckle-worthy jokes", he criticized the main couple for lacking chemistry with each other and the marriage angle for overusing an arc that's bereft of mature storytelling, saying that audiences who prefer "a perfectly nice, unambitious take" on historical romance will enjoy it. Rebecca Silverman wrote that: "While this isn't treading any new ground, there's a sort of wholesome charm to it. That goes a long way to making up for hackneyed plots or lines and the simple, at times lackluster artwork. At its heart this is a familiar story about two people coming to care for each other and overcome the obstacles life has seen fit to throw in their way. As long as it keeps that heart warm and beating, this could be a quiet charmer of a show."

Fellow ANN editor Caitlin Moore reviewed the complete anime series in 2022 and gave it a B− grade. She praised the "pleasant and cheerful" narrative, the exploration of damaged people navigating the world and finding solace in one's community and its depiction of Tamahiko's disability, but was critical of Yuzuki's "one-dimensional[ly] cheery" demeanor lacking interiority during her situation and the "lackluster visual direction" failing to further elevate the story, concluding that: "Overall, Taisho Otome Fairy Tale is a nice enough series, but it's held back by a hesitation to venture into anything beyond nice ... As it is, it's good as a relaxing watch if you're tired of the "cute girls doing cute things" rigmarole, or if you're looking for something with well-handled disability representation." Allen Moody, writing for THEM Anime Reviews, found the series to be "trite and mawkish" with its "lazy storytelling", generic charicatures and unbelivable romance between its two main leads, calling it "a lowest-common-denominator, crowd-pleasing tearjerker" that will attract its audience.
