= Hanabi-chan Is Often Late =

Japanese manga series

- Cover of Hanabi-chan Is Often Late volume 1 by Hero's Inc.

ハナビちゃんは遅れがち (Hanabi-chan wa Okuregachi)
- Genre: Comedy
- Manga
- Written by: Ranpu Shirogane
- Illustrated by: Mamimu
- Published by: Hero's Inc.
- Magazine: Comiplex
- Original run: November 21, 2019 – present
- Volumes: 9
- Anime television series
- Directed by: Hiromitsu Kanazawa
- Written by: Hiromitsu Kanazawa
- Music by: Tsukasa Yatoki
- Studio: Gaina
- Licensed by: Crunchyroll
- Original network: BS11, Tokyo MX, AT-X
- Original run: July 10, 2022 – September 25, 2022
- Episodes: 12

Hanabi-chan Is Often Late (ハナビちゃんは遅れがち, Hanabi-chan wa Okuregachi) is a Japanese comedy manga series written by Ranpu Shirogane and illustrated by Mamimu. It has been serialized online via Hero's Inc.'s Comiplex website since November 2019 and has been collected in seven tankōbon volumes. A short-form anime television series adaptation by Gaina aired from July to September 2022.

== Plot ==
A man named Musashi Shinonome visits his deceased grandfather's closed-down pachinko hall, and finds that the building is already occupied by multiple girls who are moe anthropomorphizations of pachislot machines. With these girls as his employees, Musashi re-opens the business.

== Characters ==
Hanabi Hana Ariake (有明ハナビ花, Ariake Hanabi Hana)
Voiced by: Azumi Waki
A vintage pachislot machine who gains a human form, similar to Tsukumogami.
Versus Ikusa Takanawa (高輪バーサス戦, Takanawa Bāsasu Ikusa)
Voiced by: Sumire Uesaka
Thunder Rai Nihonbashi (日本橋サンダー雷, Nihonbashi Sandā Rai)
Voiced by: M.A.O
Tacoslot Sumi Horie (堀江タコスロ墨, Horie Takosuro Sumi)
Voiced by: Nao Tōyama
Mogumogu Chō Higashisakura (東桜モグモグ超, Higashisakura Mogumogu Chō)
Voiced by: Naomi Ōzora
Condor Tsubasa Isogami (磯上コンドル翼, Isogami Kondoru Tsubasa)
Voiced by: Yoshino Nanjō
Musashi Shinonome (東雲ムサシ, Shinonome Musashi)
Voiced by: Fumiya Imai
The grandson of the previous pachinko hall owner, who died.
Kumazawa (クマザワ)
Voiced by: Toshiki Masuda
Kojiro (コジロー, Kojirō)
Voiced by: Emiri Katō
Ikkakukun (イッカククン)
Voiced by: Mari Hino

== Media ==
=== Manga ===
Hanabi-chan Is Often Late is written by Ranpu Shirogane and illustrated by Mamimu. It began serialization on Hero's Inc.'s Comiplex online manga website on November 21, 2019. The first tankōbon volume was released on February 29, 2020. As of March 2026, ten volumes have been released.

No.	Japanese release date	Japanese ISBN
1	February 29, 2020	978-4-86-468696-9
2	September 26, 2020	978-4-86-468752-2
3	April 28, 2021	978-4-86-468799-7
4	October 29, 2021	978-4-86468-829-1
5	June 29, 2022	978-4-86468-892-5
6	March 29, 2023	978-4-86468-142-1
7	March 5, 2024	978-4-86468-243-5
8	August 5, 2024	978-4-86468-277-0
9	March 28, 2025	978-4-86805-049-0
10	March 5, 2026	978-4-86805-147-3

=== Anime ===
An anime adaptation was announced on August 7, 2021. It was later revealed to be a 5-minute episode television series produced by Gaina and written and directed by Hiromitsu Kanazawa, with character designs handled by Asami Sodeyama, and music composed by Tsukasa Yatoki. It aired from July 10 to September 25, 2022, on BS11, Tokyo MX, and AT-X. Crunchyroll licensed the series outside of Asia.
