= Fumiya Imai =

Japanese voice actor (born 1997)

- 今井 文也
- Born: 5 October 1997 (age 29)
- Occupations: Voice actor; singer
- Years active: 2018–present
- Employer: Rush Style
- Notable work: Hatsune Miku: Colorful Stage! as Akito Shinonome; Phantom of the Idol as Yuya Niyodo; Hanabi-chan Is Often Late as Musashi

Fumiya Imai (今井 文也, Imai Fumiya; born 5 October 1997) is a Japanese voice actor from Hirosaki, Aomori Prefecture, affiliated with Rush Style. He is known for starring as Akito Shinonome in Hatsune Miku: Colorful Stage!, Yuya Niyodo in Phantom of the Idol, and Musashi in Hanabi-chan Is Often Late.

== Biography ==
Fumiya Imai, a native of Hirosaki, Aomori Prefecture, was born on 5 October 1997. He became interested in cue sports as a youth and even wanted to become a professional to the point of visiting a billiard hall. However, by high school, he had lost interest in the game and was not doing well in his technical classes, so he sought a different job. Inspired by the Clannad anime to go into voice acting, he discovered his voice acting talent practicing with his phone's voice recorder, and subsequently left his badminton club and made plans to move to Tokyo.

He was educated at the Amusement Media Academy. While still a student, he was an assistant personality for the eighth season of the Radio Nippon show Shūkan Kobayashi Yū. He became a full member of Rush Style in January 2022.

He voices Akito Shinonome, one of the members of Vivid Bad Squad as part of the video game Hatsune Miku: Colorful Stage!. He has also performed in several of their music releases, including the 2021 single "Rad Dogs / Cinema" (which charted at #9 in the Oricon Combined Singles Chart) and the 2022 album Vivid Bad Squad Sekai Album Vol.1 (which charted at #2 in the Oricon Combined Albums Chart). He reprised his role as Akito in the 2025 film Colorful Stage! The Movie: A Miku Who Can't Sing.

His first lead role was Yuya Niyodo in the 2022 anime television series Phantom of the Idol, and he and his co-star Shun Horie formed the tie-in unit Zings. He later voiced Musashi in the 2022 anime Hanabi-chan Is Often Late.

His hobbies include snowboarding, darts, and mahjong, and his special skills include speaking the Tsugaru dialect and playing billiards.

== Filmography ==
=== Television animation ===
Year	Title	Role	Ref.
2018	Angolmois: Record of Mongol Invasion	Sword fighter	
2018	Gintama	Shinsengumi member	
2018	Goblin Slayer	Male elf	
2019	Ace of Diamond	Nakatanaka, others	
2019	Cop Craft	SWAT member	
2019	Given	Hiiragi Kashima	
2019	Million Arthur	Guest C	
2019	One-Punch Man	Rosie	
2019	Re:Stage! Dream Days	Sugakimoto P	
2021	Taisho Otome Fairy Tale	Tamaki Shima	
2022	Bibliophile Princess	Conrad	
2022	Encouragement of Climb	Choir, classmate, comedian, mountain guide	
2022	Eternal Boys	Male student, staff	
2022	Hanabi-chan Is Often Late	Musashi Shinonome	
2022	Project Sekai	Akito Shinonome	
2022	Phantom of the Idol	Yuya Niyodo	
2022	Shoot! Goal to the Future	Sergio	
2022	The Genius Prince's Guide to Raising a Nation Out of Debt	Owl	
2022	Vazzrock The Animation	Actor	
2023	Malevolent Spirits: Mononogatari	Male student	
2023	Reborn as a Vending Machine, I Now Wander the Dungeon	Frog human demon C, injured man C, villain	
2023	Reborn to Master the Blade: From Hero-King to Extraordinary Squire	Silva Ayren, knight	
2023	Sweet Reincarnation	Nicolo	
2024	Demon Slayer: Kimetsu no Yaiba		
2024	Grandpa and Grandma Turn Young Again	Shinji Nakada	
2024	Loner Life in Another World	Delinquent B	
2024	Vampire Dormitory	Senior, others	
2026	High School! Kimengumi	Ichirō Shinjitsu	
2026	Dead Account	Dei Surugi	

=== Animated film ===
Year	Title	Role	Ref.
2024	Given: Hiiragi Mix	Hiiragi Kashima	
2024	Given: Umi e	Hiiragi Kashima	
2025	Colorful Stage! The Movie: A Miku Who Can't Sing	Akito Shinonome	

=== Video games ===
Year	Title	Role	Ref.
2018	100% Orange Juice!	Kyousuke	
2019	Magatsu Wahrheit	Protagonist voice	
2019	Monster Strike	Himehatsu, Kunitsuna Onimaru, Raidel, Topaz	
2020	Hatsune Miku: Colorful Stage!	Akito Shinonome	
2021	A3!	Rento Kinozaki	
2021	Angelique Luminarise	Taira	
2021	Clear World	Mito Gionji	
2022	White Cat Project	Chris Abyss	
2023	Xicatrice	Haruki Suzuhira	
?	Last Period	Dougane	
2024	Idols of Starlight	Hikaru Kirishima	
2025	Ensemble Stars!!	Nozomi Madoka	
2026	Disney Sparklink Stars	Hugh Gardner	

=== Other ===
Year	Title	Role	Ref.
2023	Onsenshi	Iou	
