= Kemurikusa =

Japanese anime television series

- Promotional art for the series

ケムリクサ
- Genre: Action, science fiction
- Original net animation
- Directed by: Tatsuki
- Studio: irodori
- Released: 2010 – 2012
- Episodes: 2
- Anime television series
- Directed by: Tatsuki
- Produced by: Fukuhara Yoshitada
- Written by: Tatsuki
- Music by: Tetsuya Takahashi
- Studio: Yaoyorozu
- Licensed by: Amazon Prime Video (expired)
- Original network: Tokyo MX, SUN, GYT, BS Fuji, UHB, CTC, Mie TV
- Original run: January 9, 2019 – March 27, 2019
- Episodes: 12
- Manga

Kemurikusa Wakaba Memo
- Written by: Tatsuki
- Published by: Shueisha
- Magazine: Ultra Jump
- Original run: January 19, 2019 – March 19, 2019
- icon

Kemurikusa (Japanese: ケムリクサ; lit. "Smoke Plant") is a Japanese anime television series adapted from an original net animation of the same name, which uploaded from 2010 to 2012. The series was produced by Yaoyorozu, and premiered from January to March 2019. It follows the survival journey of three sisters in a post-apocalyptic world overrun by mysterious red fog and akamushi, hostile red robot insects. It was the final production by Yaoyorozu before it was dissolved and merged into 8million in 2020.

== Characters ==
Rin (りん,凛)
Voiced by: Hiyori Koharu / Mikako Komatsu
The middle sister of the six sisters, and the protagonist of the series. Her specialties are strong eyesight, speed, and limb regeneration. She wears a rider suit with a white scarf, and has a distinctive ponytail that sticks up. Following the deaths of older sisters Ryoku, Ryo, and Riku, Rin dedicates herself to leading her remaining sisters to safety, and when necessary, sacrifices her own security to ensure their happiness. She is the quietest and most serious of all six sisters, though Ritsu says she used to have a much more cheerful and energetic personality prior to the death of their older sisters. Initially cautious and distrustful of Wakaba, Rin soon grows to respect him for his kindness and willingness to help the sisters. She is oblivious of her growing romantic feelings for him though, and thinks she is poisoned anytime she blushes around him. Her body is a vessel for the Memory Leaf, which becomes key in discovering the source of the sisters' origins and Wakaba's history with the kemurikusa.
There are a few differences in Rin's character between the original ONA and the anime adaptation. She is a bit more talkative in the ONA, though she maintains her stoic personality. She is also shown to have very intense memory replays of her sisters' deaths, but this is only briefly mentioned in the anime. In terms of appearance, her eyes are a very light purple color in the ONA and she also wears a long green scarf with her rider suit. The scarf is changed to a short, white scarf in the anime, and her eyes are changed to a magenta color matching her hair. The ONA also depicts her using the powers of the green kemurikusa like a laser to shoot things. She originally had a power that allowed her to see premonitory visions of her sisters' deaths, but this was removed for the anime.
Wakaba (わかば,若葉)
Voiced by: Yū Hōkōji / Kenji Nojima
The second protagonist of the series, Wakaba is a mysterious human who suddenly appeared in front of Rin, Ritsu and Rina one day. He wears a white-green shirt and has messy brown hair. He is a very nervous and anxious person, but is also very humble, brave and resourceful. Wakaba has no memory of where he came from or what happened in his past. The sisters originally suspected him of being an advanced humanoid form of the red bug due to his human red blood, however this was debunked when they realized how weak he was. Wakaba accidentally discovers that his special ability is being able to unlock the powers of all the kemurikusa. This interested the sisters, so they allowed him to join them on their journey, though Rin remained skeptical of him for much of the trip. Despite this, Wakaba greatly admires Rin and does what he can to help the sisters, performing selfless acts on multiple occasions to help them fight the red bugs. It is hinted that he has romantic feelings for Rin, though he is also intimidated by her and is careful about being affectionate or giving compliments.
When Wakaba unlocks Rin's Memory Leaf, it is discovered that he was a kemurikusa researcher in the past, which is why he is subconsciously able to utilize the leaves in the present. Wakaba was hired to harvest kemurikusa and create buildings and structures from them. He was friends with the First Person, Riri, who accidentally created the red bugs in an attempt to allow Wakaba to have more free time to play with her.
His ONA character design is drastically different from his anime counterpart. In the ONA Wakaba has very short hair and wears an oversized white turtleneck sweater with green and grey striped sleeves. While somewhat clumsy and timid in the anime, the ONA depicts Wakaba as having decent reflexes and not being as easily scared.
Ritsu (りつ,律)
Voiced by: kokko / Arisa Kiyoto
The older sister of Rin and Rina, and the leader of the trio of sisters. It is unknown if she is actually older in age, as Rin and the Rinas refer to her as the oldest simply because she gained consciousness before them. Ritsu has magenta cat ears matching her wavy magenta hair and wears a miko outfit. Her specialty powers are sound and being able to control the kemurikusa tree to help with fighting and traveling. Her cat ears are able to detach from her body and travel via the kemurikusa tree roots to hear over very long distances. Ritsu discovered the green kemurikusa plant when she woke up, and nurtured it to grow into the strong tree that provides the sisters with green kemurikusa for fighting and healing. As such, she has a very strong bond with the tree and never leaves its side. The tree is connected to a broken cable car, and the roots work as legs to transport the vehicle whenever the sisters travel. She is a bit weaker than the other sisters, having perpetually tired eyes and occasional bouts of coughing. She also does not walk very often, choosing to either remain in the cable car or use the kemurikusa tree roots to help her move. She fights by controlling the strong tree roots during battle. Regardless of her poor health, Ritsu is optimistic, caring, responsible, and level-headed. She leads the sisters in making rational decisions throughout the journey. She is aware of how much Rin sacrifices her happiness for the sisters' sake, and urges Rin to think of herself from time to time. Ritsu is also the first to guess that Rin and Wakaba care a lot for each other.
Her anime character design, personality, and powers are drastically different from the ONA. In the ONA, Ritsu has straight pink hair and skin-tone colored cat ears. Her miko outfit is not present, and she instead wears a white and green striped body suit with a black covering on top. She has no health problems in the ONA, and is capable of anger and violence if she feels her loved ones are threatened. When she controls the green kemurikusa tree to fight, it morphs into a pale demonic version of herself with pink glowing eyes. She was also given levitation powers, which was her main mode of transportation. Her personality was originally more playful and slightly dangerous. She was also a bit more cat-like, ending all of her sentences in "nya" or "nyan." This is toned down in the anime, and she only occasionally ends her sentences in "nya." As the original ONA took place in a more tech-advanced world than the anime, Ritsu was also depicted as being the most tech-savvy of the sisters.
Rina (りな,鳴)
Voiced by: Neko Sakura / Tomomi Jiena Sumi
The youngest sister, who wears a maid costume. Originally a single person, she divides herself into six smaller selves to avoid being injured during battle, each miniature version with their own names and slightly different personalities (Rinaji, Rinayo, Rinacchi, Rinamu, Rinazo and Rinako). In both the anime and ONA, Rinako is killed by a red bug in the first episode, and Rinazo is presumed dead before the start of the anime, but the other Rinas are not affected by these losses and the series continues with the four remaining Rinas. Rina has a very childlike, curious and playful personality. Her specialty power is taste, with the Rinas always scouring for various types of scrap metal to eat and satisfy their large appetites. Eating scrap metal makes the Rinas very strong despite their small size, and they can also manipulate small balls on the ends of their maid dresses to act as weapons or security scouts. They were both apprehensive and curious about Wakaba when he first appeared, wanting to eat him to see how their bodies would be affected. However they quickly warm up to his polite and equally curious personality, though they continue to make fun of his clumsiness and aloofness throughout the series. The Rinas are also aware that Rin and Wakaba have feelings for each other, but they do not mention this until near the end of the series.
The anime Rina is largely the same as her ONA counterpart, with the only differences being her height and outfit design. In the ONA, Rina does not look so much like a child and is actually the same height as Rin, though she maintains her childlike personality. Her outfit in the ONA does not have the detachable parts used in the anime, instead having green electricity-powered designs on the skirt. She also wears green and grey striped socks in the ONA, but these are absent in the anime.
Riku (りく,陸)
Voiced by: Neko Sakura / Kanna Tensawa
One of the older sisters presumed to be dead prior to the start of the series, however Wakaba finds her alive and well on Island 6. She tells Wakaba that she left the sisters to investigate the world and try to figure out the relation between the kemurikusa and akamushi. Riku wears a hooded black dress, a red scarf, and ties her short magenta hair into pigtails. She was known to be the most clumsy and careless among the six sisters, so much that the sisters use her as a reference for Wakaba's clumsiness. Regardless, she is also very brave and adventurous, excavating new areas for her sisters and being a pro at detecting akamushi. Her specialty power is touch, and she is able to read and acquire much information simply by touching living things. Her fighting style is to use the green kemurikusa to manifest electric powers. Like Wakaba, Riku is very interested in finding and learning about kemurikusa. Most likely due to her power of touch, she was the only sister who figured out how to unlock the powers of the various kemurikusa, and teaches Wakaba many of these tricks when she meets him.
Riku's ONA character and design is drastically different from her anime counterpart. In the ONA, she wears a full black bodysuit, pink Mary Janes, and ties her pink hair in six braided pigtails (three on each side of her head). Her teeth are sharp in the ONA, and she is shown to have slightly aggressive behavior when separated from her sisters.
Ryō (りょう,稜)
Voiced by: Yūna Mimura
The oldest of the six sisters, presumed to be dead when the series begins. She appears near the end of the series on Island 8 to help fight the red bugs. She has magenta hair tied into a single braid, and wears a black sleeveless qipao with magenta embroidery. Her specialty powers are having a strong sense of smell and exceptional strength, though she claims Rin is actually stronger than her. She battles the red bugs using a pipe with kemurikusa tied to the top. Her personality is very easy-going and laid back, though she loves to fight and gets very excited just by the thought of it. However, she is also a bit of a pacifist, and used to urge the sisters to fight with their own skills rather than relying on the green kemurikusa. She admits to Wakaba that she is actually dying due to some permanent weakness after fighting Nushi, extremely large and hostile versions of the red bugs. Ryo was the original vessel for the Memory Leaf, but later transferred the leaf to Rin to help her get stronger. After this, she began sharing bodies with her sister Ryoku to conserve energy.
Ryoku (りょく,綠)
Voiced by: Akira Sekine
The youngest sister with glasses and long hair. She has the ability to share bodies with Ryo.
Shiro (しろ,白)
A small, benevolent white bug that is loyal to Wakaba and assists the sisters on their journey.
Riri (りり)
Akagi (あかぎ,赤木)

== Media ==
=== ONA ===
The series was originally released as a two-part original net animation (ONA) between 2010 and 2012. The series was created by director Tatsuki and his three-person animation group irodori.

=== TV series ===
On October 28, 2017, Tatsuki announced that he was recruiting background artists for an unannounced project. Tatsuki and irodori announced a new television anime project with a flier at Comiket on December 29, 2017. On February 11, 2018, during the "Yaoyorozu Status Update Talk Event" at the Shinjuku Alta Theater in Tokyo, it was announced that the project would be an adaptation of the Kemurikusa, and would be directed by Tatsuki and animated by Yaoyorozu. The other two members of irodori, Yoshihisa Isa and Yūko Shiromizu, will serve as animation director and art director, respectively, while Yoshitada Fukuhara serves as the animation producer. The series premiered on January 9, 2019, and would broadcast on BS Fuji and other channels, while streaming on Amazon Video. Tatsuki posted a short episode on his Twitter account on August 31, 2018, an "episode 0.5" on September 30, 2018, an "episode 0.6" on October 31, 2018, an "episode 0.7" on November 30, 2018, an "episode 0.8" on December 31, 2018, and an "episode 0.9" on January 2, 2019.

The series premiered January 9 and aired until March 27, 2019, on Tokyo MX and other channels. Nano performs the series' opening theme song "KEMURIKUSA." The ending theme is "INDETERMINATE UNIVERSE," sang by Hatsune Miku and the voice actresses for Rin, Rina and Ritsu (all three simply listed as "Kemurikusa" in the song credits). The series aired with 12 episodes.

=== "Episode 12.1" ===
On April 3, 2019, Tatsuki posted a mini episode called "Episode 12.1" on his Twitter as a follow-up to the conclusion of the anime. It depicts the older sisters Ryoku, Ryo and Riku.

== Reception ==
The ONA won the 24th CG Anime Contest in 2012.

The Encyclopedia of Science Fiction described Kemurikusa as a good, imaginative and engaging science fiction anime, praising its atmospheric electronic soundtrack, appealing background designs and mysterious post-apocalyptic setting. Although it noted the limitations of the low-budget computer-generated animation, it commended the series' storytelling, which favors gradual revelations and subtle hints over explicit explanations. The encyclopedia compared the series to director Tatsuki's earlier Kemono Friends, observing similarities in their premises and narrative approaches but emphasizing that Kemurikusa has a considerably bleaker atmosphere. It also praised the likeable central characters, particularly the sisters, although it found Wakaba's frequent exclamations potentially irritating. Despite its darker tone, the review highlighted the ultimately hopeful ending.
