= Phantom of the Idol =

Japanese manga series

- Cover of the first tankōbon volume, featuring Asahi Mogami (left) and Yuya Niyodo (right)

神クズ☆アイドル (Kami Kuzu Aidoru)
- Genre: Comedy
- Manga
- Written by: Hijiki Isoflavone
- Published by: Ichijinsha
- English publisher: NA: Kodansha USA
- Magazine: Monthly Comic Zero Sum
- Original run: December 28, 2017 – present
- Volumes: 9
- Anime television series
- Directed by: Daisei Fukuoka
- Written by: Yasuko Aoki
- Music by: myu
- Studio: Studio Gokumi
- Licensed by: Sentai Filmworks: SEA: Mighty Media; TW/HK: Mighty Media
- Original network: TV Tokyo, BS11, AT-X
- Original run: July 2, 2022 – September 3, 2022
- Episodes: 10

Phantom of the Idol (神クズ☆アイドル, Kami Kuzu Aidoru) is a Japanese comedy manga series by Hijiki Isoflavone. It has been serialized in Ichijinsha's josei manga magazine Monthly Comic Zero Sum since December 2017 and has been collected in nine tankōbon volumes as of July 2025. The manga is licensed in North America by Kodansha USA. An anime television series adaptation by Studio Gokumi aired from July to September 2022.

== Plot ==
Yuya Niyodo is on the verge of being fired from his job as an idol in the two-man group ZINGS, due to his poor and lazy attitude, when he meets the ghost of Asahi Mogami, a popular idol who died a year ago in a traffic accident. Niyodo gets her to possess him and do his job for him, causing him to gain a reputation as a strange idol.

== Characters ==
=== Main ===
Yuya Niyodo (仁淀ユウヤ, Niyodo Yūya)
Voiced by: Fumiya Imai (Japanese); Kiba Walker (English)
Yuya is a member of idol unit ZINGS. However, since he debuted as an idol to earn easy money, he is unmotivated during performance and fan interactions. He lets Asahi possess his body during his idol activity so Asahi can stay in the living world as long as possible, and he can keep earning easy money.
Asahi Mogami (最上アサヒ, Mogami Asahi)
Voiced by: Nao Tōyama (Japanese); Shanae'a Moore (English)
A popular idol from the group I'm who lost her life in a car accident and became a ghost roughly a year before her encounter with Niyodo.
Kazuki Yoshino (吉野カズキ, Yoshino Kazuki)
Voiced by: Shun Horie (Japanese); Ry McKeand (English)
An idol and member of ZINGS who desperately keeps Yuya in the unit because he cannot perform alone.

=== Others ===
Hitomi Shinano (信濃ヒトミ, Shinano Hitomi)
Voiced by: Eri Kitamura (Japanese); Shelley Calene-Black (English)
The manager of ZINGS and owner of the company they belong to.
Kasenjiki (河川敷)
Voiced by: Hitomi Ueda (Japanese); Christina Kelly (English)
A dedicated Niyodo fan with green hair who often wears a headband with lightsticks attached to it.
Tsugiko (ツギコ)
Voiced by: Yō Taichi (Japanese); Alyssa Marek (English)
A Niyodo fan who works an office job.
Shigutaro (しぐたろ)
Voiced by: Manaka Iwami (Japanese); Annie Wild (English)
A Niyodo fan who is also a student.
Hikaru Setouchi (瀬戸内ヒカル, Setouchi Hikaru)
Voiced by: Takuma Terashima (Japanese); Bobby Haworth (English)
The leader of popular idol group Cgrass. Setouchi initially believes that Niyodo is copying Asahi Mogami, and creates a thorough website documenting every time Niyodo behaves strangely or poorly.
Chihiro Misaki (岬チヒロ, Misaki Chihiro)
Voiced by: Takuya Satō (Japanese); Cole Feuchter (English)
A member of popular idol group Cgrass.
Akira Uchihama (内濱アキラ, Uchihama Akira)
Voiced by: Tatsuyuki Kobayashi (Japanese); Jack Stansbury (English)
A member of popular idol group Cgrass.
Yukinari Nada (灘ユキナリ, Nada Yukinari)
Voiced by: Haruki Ishiya (Japanese); Jeran Ugakwe (English)
A member of popular idol group Cgrass.
Homare Hakata (伯方ホマレ, Hakata Homare)
Voiced by: Yōhei Azakami (Japanese); Nathan Wilson (English)
A member of popular idol group Cgrass.
Narrator (ナレーション, Narēshon)
Voiced by: Show Hayami (Japanese); Jack Ivy (English)

== Media ==
=== Manga ===
Phantom of the Idol is written and illustrated by Hijiki Isoflavone. The series began serialization in Ichijinsha's Monthly Comic Zero Sum magazine on December 28, 2017. The manga is licensed in North America by Kodansha USA.

| No. | Original release date | Original ISBN | English release date | English ISBN |
|---|---|---|---|---|
| 1 | June 25, 2018 | 978-4-7580-3360-2 | May 24, 2022 | 978-1-64-651465-6 |
| 2 | April 25, 2019 | 978-4-7580-3424-1 | August 16, 2022 | 978-1-64-651585-1 |
| 3 | June 25, 2020 | 978-4-7580-3524-8 | November 29, 2022 | 978-1-64-651586-8 |
| 4 | April 24, 2021 | 978-4-7580-3601-6 | January 31, 2023 | 978-1-64-651587-5 |
| 5 | January 25, 2022 | 978-4-7580-3696-2; 978-4-7580-3697-9 (SE) | April 4, 2023 | 978-1-64-651588-2 |
| 6 | July 25, 2022 | 978-4-7580-3764-8; 978-4-7580-3765-5 (SE) | July 18, 2023 | 978-1-64-651747-3 |
| 7 | July 25, 2023 | 978-4-7580-3889-8 | April 23, 2024 | 978-1-64-651936-1 |
| 8 | July 31, 2024 | 978-4-7580-8556-4 | October 25, 2025 | 979-8-88-877061-0 |
| 9 | July 31, 2025 | 978-4-7580-8761-2 | — | — |

=== Anime ===
An anime television series adaptation was announced on November 26, 2021. It was produced by Studio Gokumi and directed by Daisei Fukuoka, with scripts written by Yasuko Aoki, character designs handled by Saori Hosoda, and music composed by myu. It aired from July 2 to September 3, 2022, on TV Tokyo, BS11, and AT-X. (Note: TV Tokyo listed the series premiere at 25:53 on July 1, 2022, which is effectively 1:53 a.m. JST on July 2.) The opening theme song is "Let's Zing!", while the ending theme song is "Kimikira", both performed by the musical unit ZINGS, composed of Fumiya Imai and Shun Horie. Sentai Filmworks has licensed the series.

On November 16, 2023, Hidive announced the series would receive an English dub, which premiered on November 23.

== Reception ==
In 2019, Phantom of the Idol placed third in the 5th Next Manga Award in the print category.
