= Hatsune Miku: Colorful Stage! =

2020 Japanese mobile game

- Promotional image for the game's 1st year of operation, featuring Crypton Future Media's Hatsune Miku (left) and character Ichika Hoshino (right)
- Developers: Colorful Palette; Sega
- Publishers: Sega; Nuverse
- Producer: Yuichiro Kondo
- Series: Hatsune Miku: Project Diva
- Engine: Unity
- Platforms: Android, iOS
- Release: JP: September 30, 2020; TW/HK/MAC: September 30, 2021; WW: December 7, 2021; KR: May 20, 2022; SEA: September 25, 2023; CHN: March 27, 2025
- Genres: Rhythm game, visual novel
- Modes: Single-player, multiplayer

Hatsune Miku: Colorful Stage! (originally released in Japan as Project Sekai: Colorful Stage! feat. Hatsune Miku (Note: Japanese: プロジェクトセカイ カラフルステージ！ feat.初音ミク, Hepburn: Purojekuto Sekai Karafuru Sutēji! fīcharingu Hatsune Miku)) is a rhythm game developed by Colorful Palette (a subsidiary of CyberAgent) in cooperation with, and published by, Sega. The game features the 6 Virtual Singers of Crypton Future Media – Hatsune Miku, Megurine Luka, Kagamine Rin and Len, Meiko, and Kaito – alongside the cast of twenty original human characters that are split into five themed units. Set in the real world where Virtual Singers only exist as fiction, the characters come across another dimension called "SEKAI", which is created by the members' "true feelings".

The game was released for Android and iOS devices on September 30, 2020, in Japan. A Taiwanese server, published by Nuverse, was released on September 30, 2021. Sega released an English server of the game worldwide on December 7, 2021, with expansion to 5 countries in Southeast Asia on September 25, 2023. A Korean server was released on May 20, 2022, in South Korea, published by Nuverse. A Simplified Chinese server was released on March 27, 2025, in mainland China.

== Gameplay ==
Example gameplay of Hatsune Miku: Colorful Stage! showing the various difficulty levels with a 3D-animated music video playing in the background. The song shown is the Sekai version of "Color of Drops" by 40mp featuring More More Jump! and Megurine Luka in the Taiwan version, played on Normal, Hard and Expert difficulties.

Hatsune Miku: Colorful Stage!'s gameplay consists of tapping notes as they slide toward the bottom to the rhythm of a chosen song; players have to tap, slide, and flick to match new free-form rhythm notes, and special yellow notes that are worth more points towards the score. The overall gameplay is similar to Sega's Chunithm and Bandai Namco's The Idolmaster-themed rhythm games, the players are given 1,000 health points to clear a song with the ability to heal through character skills, though it cannot go above 2000 health points at a time. Players can choose between five difficulty levels for each song, consisting of Easy, Normal, Hard, Expert, and Master, with a sixth APPEND difficulty being added for some songs. This APPEND difficulty involves using more than 2 fingers. The scroll speed, which affects the spacing of on-screen notes and the rate at which they approach, may be adjusted freely. Instead of an energy system that is prevalent in most free-to-play games, this game utilizes Bonus Energy that increase rewards for completing a song, and players can continue playing even when they run out of boosts.

Players gain experience points (EXP) by clearing songs and listening to overworld conversations between characters. Such conversations are fully voiced with 2.5D movement via Live2D technology, and their conversations are depicted in a visual novel-style presentation that is prepared for each group, including Virtual Singers, such as Hatsune Miku. Further conversations are added over time through events, which also feature an After Show part at the end of each event. Cards, which use a star ranking system to determine rarity, with four stars being the rarest, are acquired via the gacha system, a luck-based mechanic in which players spend the in-game currency Crystals with the hope of winning their desired cards. Although this is a free-to-play game, players can spend real-life currency to acquire in-game currency.

The game also features Virtual Shows, which is a mode where players can go to a virtual concert, similar to augmented reality or a Vocaloid-themed live concert, where players can interact with one another. They can see other players all around the world, using various items that can be given to characters, which are usable via currency, and their favorite group performing via 3D animation. These can be viewable in real-time, like the event's After Shows, birthday/anniversary shows and seasonal shows for example, with Welcome Shows, formerly known as Release Commemoration Shows, which are available for the first couple weeks after starting the game, or via archives, which require currency, except for the event's After Shows, which are viewable after finishing an event's main story. Furthermore, Connect Shows, which are mainly held in the Japanese server, are large scale versions of Virtual Shows, which require paid currency, featured full versions of various songs and real-time interactions with characters during the show, which are excluded in archival versions, and the Chinese version.

A life simulation-based mode, MYSEKAI, was added in 2025 in Japan and Asia and 2026 worldwide. Players can decorate their own customizable SEKAI by gathering materials and crafting furniture, as well as interact with the game's main characters. Unlike the main game, stamina is used by gathering, while Bonus Energy allows use of boosted stamina, which boosts gathering speed.

In 2026, first on Japanese servers, players can create their own charts, which require creators to achieve a Full Combo or All Perfect to post and share their created chart.

The game initially launched with 28 songs, with around four new songs added per month to the game, with over 700 songs currently included. The tracklist mainly consists of Vocaloid songs or those from Vocaloid producers, with most songs having two versions: the original version (or new versions specifically made for the game; named "Virtual Singer version" in-game), and Sekai versions, having the song covered by the original characters, and most of the time joined by a virtual singer. Some songs also have a 3D-animated (named "3DMV" in-game) and/or 2D-animated music video (MV), with animated MVs either being newly created for the game (named "2DMV" in-game) or original MVs (named "Original MV" in-game). Songs without an official MV are played with a static 2D background, commonly known as "Lite" in-game.

== Plot ==
=== Setting ===
Hatsune Miku: Colorful Stage! is set in the real world, specifically in Shibuya, Tokyo. In this game, Hatsune Miku and her friends are famous fictional singers existing in the real world as Virtual Singers. They sing songs from creators all over the world, but they also exist in "SEKAI" (セカイ), a mysterious world different from the real world that is created from a person's "true feelings", featuring various visual appearances based on the person. There are as many SEKAI as there are emotions, and their form changes depending on the person's emotions. Therefore, the focus of the game is on the original characters and their journeys to find their "true feelings" with the help of the virtual singers.

To enter SEKAI, one user must find and play the song "Untitled", a silent song with no melody or lyrics that was created at the same time as every SEKAI and mysteriously inserted on their devices and can be played on anything. Upon playing an "Untitled" song, the person will travel between the real world and their SEKAI. When one user manages to discover their true feelings, the song will then have a playable melody, lyrics, and title.

=== Story ===
Each of the five groups and members has their own story, focusing on their journey to convey their "true feelings":

- Leo/need: Ichika Hoshino wishes to recover her memories with her childhood friends—Saki Tenma, Shiho Hinomori, and Honami Mochizuki—to make them come together again as their friendship had become strained in the aftermath of various circumstances that occurred during middle school. She entered the School Sekai and met a punk-rock-styled Miku, who told her to convey her feelings to her friends and overcome their differences. Ichika and her friends eventually formed a band to restore their friendship and discover their shared memories through music.
- More More Jump!: Minori Hanasato has dreamed of becoming an idol ever since she saw Haruka Kiritani when she was very young. Despite having failed auditions multiple times, she never gives up and hopes to pass an audition one day to achieve her dream. One day, on the school rooftop, she met Haruka when the latter was practicing her dance moves, only to find out Haruka had retired from her idol career. The two entered the Stage Sekai along with Airi Momoi and Shizuku Hinomori, where they met an idol-like Miku, who encouraged Minori to make her dream come true.
- Vivid Bad Squad: Kohane Azusawa has been deeply passionate about street music ever since she stumbled upon a singing session by An Shiraishi. Captivated by her singing, Kohane joined An to become a street musician herself and later teamed up with former rivals Akito Shinonome and Toya Aoyagi, who had previously formed a group called the "Bad Dogs". They entered the Street Sekai and met a hip-hop-styled Miku, and together they began the quest to surpass a legend.
- Wonderlands x Showtime: Tsukasa Tenma has always wanted to make his sickly sister, Saki, happy, but as time passed, he couldn't remember why he wanted to be a star in the first place. He was hired to work part-time at the theme park Phoenix Wonderland, but the once-popular Wonder Stage theater he is assigned to has been deserted, unable to attract any visitors for years. There, he met Emu Otori, who desires to restore the theater to its former glory, considering it her grandfather's legacy. Joined by Nene Kusanagi and Rui Kamishiro, they formed a musical theater troupe as they entered the Wonderland Sekai and met a clown-like Miku, hoping to revive the theater's glory and make people happy.
- Nightcord at 25:00: Kanade "K" Yoisaki has been homeschooled and has become reclusive due to a trauma she sustained from an incident that happened in the past. She formed an underground music circle with her three online acquaintances—Mafuyu "Yuki" Asahina, Ena "Enanan" Shinonome, and Mizuki "Amia" Akiyama. They communicated via a voice-chat platform named "Nightcord", meeting every late night at 25:00 (1 AM). None of them knew each other's true names or identities, only knowing each other by online aliases and through voice chat. Kanade was pulled into the Empty Sekai by a mysterious-looking Miku, who urged her to help save Mafuyu(Yuki), the group's lyricist, who had mysteriously disappeared a week prior.

== Characters ==
Each group's "Sekai" in the game's story has a different Hatsune Miku with a distinctly themed character design. Pictured here are the alternate Mikus for (left to right) Leo/need, More More Jump!, Vivid Bad Squad, Wonderlands x Showtime, and Nightcord at 25:00.

The characters are divided into five groups of four, each with a theme related to the group's backstory, complete with Hatsune Miku in a thematic design to sing alongside them, in addition to one or two other Virtual Singers (except for Nightcord at 25:00, who started with only Miku). As the game's story progresses, new versions of each virtual singer appear in the different Sekai.

=== Virtual Singers ===
The Virtual Singers are characters from Crypton Future Media's singing synthesizer software line. They exist in the real world as fictional software and popular characters, but in "Sekai", they possess their own personalities and appearances tailored to each group's feelings. The six Virtual Singers featured in the game are Hatsune Miku, Kagamine Rin, Kagamine Len, Megurine Luka, MEIKO, and KAITO.

=== Leo/need ===
Adding wordmark

An all-girl pop-rock band formed by a group of childhood friends who reunited in high school as they vowed to get over their differences. The group's members are Ichika Hoshino, Saki Tenma, Honami Mochizuki, and Shiho Hinomori. Their Sekai, the School Sekai, consists of a classroom bathed in the afterglow of the sunset. They are initially supported by Hatsune Miku and Megurine Luka, who take on the form of rock band musicians. Their image color is Midnight Blue, and they represent reminiscence.

==== Ichika Hoshino ====
Ichika Hoshino is the main guitarist and vocalist of Leo/need. She cares deeply about her bandmates and has been a fan of Hatsune Miku since a young age. Together with Leo/need, Ichika hopes to become a professional band. She is voiced by Ruriko Noguchi.

==== Saki Tenma ====
Saki Tenma is the keyboardist of Leo/need. Due to experiences with an undisclosed illness during middle school, she was taken out of school. When she gets back, she values spending time with her friends and bandmates and puts these feelings into her music. She is voiced by Karin Isobe.

==== Honami Mochizuki ====
The drummer of Leo/need, Honami is a kind, nurturing girl who supports her bandmates. However, she struggles with decision-making because she does not want to hurt others. Her time with Leo/need has helped her to grow more courageous. She is voiced by Reina Ueda.

==== Shiho Hinomori ====
The bassist of Leo/need has been dedicated to music and playing the bass from a young age. Her serious attitude and standoffish nature already led to Shiho gaining a reputation as a lone wolf, she cares deeply about her bandmates. Her birthday is 8 January. She is the little sister of Shizuku Hinomori and they watched the Moon together as children. Shiho and her sister remained close into high school until Shizuku became an idol and they started to drift apart. She is voiced by Yuki Nakashima.

=== More More Jump! ===
Wordmark of MORE MORE JUMP!

A pop idol group formed by one energetic girl aspiring to become an idol and three former idols who quit their careers for various reasons. The group's members are Minori Hanasato, Haruka Kiritani, Airi Momoi, and Shizuku Hinomori. Their Sekai, the Stage Sekai, consists of a concert stage illuminated by countless glow sticks. They are initially supported by Hatsune Miku and Kagamine Rin, who take on the form of pop idols. Their image color is Bright Green, and they represent hope.

==== Minori Hanasato ====
A hardworking girl who hopes to become a nationally known idol. The only member of More More Jump! with no idol experience outside of the group, she was inspired to become an idol after seeing Haruka Kiritani perform with her former idol group. She is voiced by Yui Ogura.

==== Haruka Kiritani ====
A former member of the popular idol group ASRUN, Haruka retired from the entertainment industry after the group disbanded. However, after meeting Minori and joining More More Jump!, she has regained a passion for performing. She is voiced by Mayu Yoshioka.

==== Airi Momoi ====
A former member of an idol group known as QT and also having appeared on various variety shows, she retired from the industry after certain circumstances. Despite this, Airi is passionate about being an idol and now uses this to motivate the rest of More More Jump!. She is voiced by Ai Furihata.

==== Shizuku Hinomori ====
A former member of the still-popular idol group known as Cheerful＊Days, she has been moving forward with More More Jump! after leaving Cheerful Days due to conflicts with the other members. She is voiced by Rina Honnizumi.

=== Vivid Bad Squad ===
A top-level hip-hop, teen pop, electronic, and street music group formed to surpass a legend. They are a merger of two musical duos: Vivids and Bad Dogs. The group's members are Kohane Azusawa, An Shiraishi, Akito Shinonome, and Toya Aoyagi. Their Sekai, the Street Sekai, consists of an alleyway with walls covered in graffiti and concert posters. They are initially supported by Hatsune Miku, who takes on the form of a street dancer, alongside Meiko, who takes on the form of a café waitress, and Kagamine Len, who takes on the form of a disc jockey. Their image color is Vivid Red, and they represent passion.

==== Kohane Azusawa ====
A shy girl who lacks self-confidence. However, she has been gaining confidence whilst performing with Vivid Bad Squad. She was introduced to street music after seeing An Shiraishi performing at a live café, and eventually formed Vivids with An. She is voiced by Akina.

==== An Shiraishi ====
After seeing her father perform at an event known as Rad Weekend, An has been passionate about street music and surpassing the event her father held. She later created Vivids with Kohane and went on to join Vivid Bad Squad. She is voiced by Tomomi Jiena Sumi.

==== Akito Shinonome ====
A hardworking boy who, along with An, discovered his passion for street music after seeing Rad Weekend. He formed Bad Dogs with Toya Aoyagi and is driven by his passion to keep practicing to surpass Rad Weekend despite any challenges the group faces. He is voiced by Fumiya Imai.

==== Toya Aoyagi ====
Born into a prestigious classical music family, Toya defied his father's wishes and pursued street music with Akito as Bad Dogs and eventually with Vivid Bad Squad. He hopes to surpass any challenges the group faces together and surpass RAD WEEKEND. He is voiced by Kent Ito.

=== Wonderlands x Showtime ===
An eccentric musical theater troupe formed to "put a smile on people's faces to make the world happy". The group's members are Tsukasa Tenma, Emu Ōtori, Nene Kusanagi, and Rui Kamishiro. Nene is accompanied by a robot known as Robo-Nene, (Note: In the English server, Nenerobo is referred to as Robo-nene.) an initially remote-controlled and later AI-powered robot created for Nene by Rui for her to perform despite her stage fright early in the story. After Nene overcame her stage fright, Robo-Nene became primarily used as comedic relief. Their Sekai, alternatively called the Wonderland Sekai, consists of an amusement park filled with whimsical encounters like singing flowers and living stuffed animals. They are initially supported by Hatsune Miku, who takes on the form of a cat-like jester, and Kaito, who takes on the form of a suited actor. Their image color is Pop Yellow, and they represent happiness.

==== Tsukasa Tenma ====
A confident and prideful actor who hopes to become the world's greatest star. After gaining experience and exploring the world with Wonderlands x Showtime, he eventually decides to take the next step forward with his troupe. He is voiced by Daisuke Hirose.

==== Emu Ōtori ====
A girl with an incredibly joyful and outgoing personality. Encouraged by her desire to preserve the theme park her family owns, she continues to perform and improve with Wonderlands x Showtime. She is voiced by Hina Kino.

==== Nene Kusanagi ====
A shy girl who wishes to become a world-famous musical theatre actor. Her confidence was damaged after an incident during a performance, however she has since recovered and rediscovered her confidence and love of performing. She is voiced by Machico.

==== Rui Kamishiro ====
The laid-back director and mechanic of Wonderlands x Showtime. He is highly skilled at inventing stage gimmicks and robots, such as Robo-Nene. After performing alone due to his ideas not being accepted by others, his directing style was eventually welcomed into Wonderlands x Showtime. He is voiced by Shunichi Toki.

=== Nightcord at 25:00 ===
Logo of Nightcord at 25:00

An indie underground music circle whose identities are shrouded in mystery. Each of the group's members has expressed thoughts of "wanting to disappear." The group's four members are Kanade Yoisaki (K), Mafuyu Asahina (Yuki), Ena Shinonome (Enanan), and Mizuki Akiyama (Amia). Their Sekai, alternatively called the Empty Sekai, consists of a space with nothing in it apart from a few dim rays of light and distorted screens. The only Virtual Singer to accompany them at the game launch is Hatsune Miku, who is mysterious in her personality as seen with her gothic lolita appearance, though this changes later on. Their image color is Dark Purple, and they represent trauma. Nightcord refers to the online voice-chat platform the group uses, similar to the real-life chat platform Discord. Nightcord at 25:00 is often abbreviated as N25.

==== Kanade Yoisaki ====
Nightcord at 25:00's composer who goes by the username "K" online. Because of her trauma consisting of her music sending her father into despair, Kanade believes that she must make music in order to make others happy. She is voiced by Tomori Kusunoki.

==== Mafuyu Asahina ====
Nightcord at 25:00's lyricist who goes by the username "Yuki" (雪) online. Although widely regarded by others as a perfect honor student, helping others at school, Mafuyu is pressured by her mother to be a "good girl" and pursue a career in medicine, causing her to lose her true self. However, she works with Nightcord at 25:00 in secret. She is voiced by Rui Tanabe.

==== Ena Shinonome ====
Nightcord at 25:00's illustrator who goes by the username "Enanan" (えななん) online. Despite her lack of natural artistic talent, she continues to persevere despite harsh criticism from those around her, especially her father Shinei Shinonome, a famous former artist. Despite initially clashing with her colleague Mafuyu, she eventually sees her and the rest of Nightcord at 25:00 as good companions. She is voiced by Minori Suzuki.

==== Mizuki Akiyama ====
Nightcord at 25:00's video editor, who loves cute things and goes by their username "Amia" online. After creating a music video for a song Kanade had created, they were invited to join the circle by Kanade herself. They hid a major secret about themselves, which was revealed as the story progresses. They are voiced by Hinata Sato.

== Development ==
The game was first announced on August 30, 2019, during the Magical Mirai event from 2019, as part of the 10th anniversary of the SEGA feat. Hatsune Miku Project. It was developed by Colorful Palette, a newly established subsidiary of CyberAgent's Craft Egg (developers of rhythm game BanG Dream! Girls Band Party), which later spun-off as an subsidiary of CyberAgent. Yuichiro Kondo, the first producer of Girls Band Party, also serves as the producer for this game. The project started in 2017 and was initially being developed entirely by Craft Egg, but Kondo thought it was necessary to avoid a situation where the project would clash with the development of Girls Band Party, so he created Colorful Palette with Craft Egg's core members within the company. It was developed with Unity, and uses Crypton's Piapro Studio NT engine for speech synthesis. Sega provided 3D models. The game's visual novel-style story sequences utilize Live2D Cubism for the character sprites and expressions.

The title is a rhythm game that features arrangements of songs made by various artists over the years using the Vocaloid software. The original story of the game is told in a visual novel and musical film-style. The direction of the game's design and concept is different from other Hatsune Miku-related games—such as Sega's Hatsune Miku: Project Diva, where the player and Hatsune Miku face each other directly and communicate in the game. The project is said to be "a work that embodies the existence of Hatsune Miku" and explores the relationship between music and people. One of the reasons behind this format was the idea of "wanting the younger generation to listen to more Vocaloid music and other songs from the internet". Therefore, while knowing that there could be people opposed to the idea of the addition of original characters, it was decided to develop such a setting.

== Release ==
The game's pre-registration was originally set to begin in late April, but was delayed until further notice due to the COVID-19 pandemic. The pre-registration later started on July 17, 2020, with the name Project Sekai: Colorful Stage! Rehearsal Edit, and Sega revealed the goals were reset from 100,000 to 1,000,000 pre-registrations. According to the developers, in September 2020, the pre-registrations reached 1,000,000 and after that, players who pre-registered received rewards.

The game's worldwide release was announced in August 2021 with a slightly different title, Hatsune Miku: Colorful Stage!. Nuverse released the game in Hong Kong, Macau, and Taiwan on September 30, 2021. Nuverse is also managing the release in mainland China, South Korea, and Southeast Asia. Sega released the game for all other regions, including the West, on December 7, 2021. The game was released on September 25, 2023, for Southeast Asia, said to be an extension for the global server. A Project Sekai server has been released in China as of March 27, 2025.

== Reception ==
By July 2021, Colorful Stage! had reached over 5 million users and received positive reviews. The game was ranked 9th on Twitter's Most Talked About Video Games list in 2021. In June 2022, Colorful Stage! surpassed 10 million users, and celebrated 15 million players as of July 2025.

== Anime ==
=== Mini animation series ===
A mini anime series titled Petit Sekai (ぷちセカ, Puchiseka) was announced during the game's first anniversary live stream. The anime mini-series has 10 episodes that was broadcast through Tokyo MX and is available for free to watch through the game's official YouTube channel. The anime has the characters drawn in chibi-style, and a bit of gag-esque story that is slightly different from the original story. It premiered on January 13, 2022. Official English subtitles were made available sometime after the official premiere.

In February 2022, episode 6, "Leo/need Style", was pulled after a scene where the characters wore ganguro-like makeup and tribal-like costumes drew backlash for racism, including accusations of blackface and cultural appropriation, with an apology (in both Japanese and English) from the game's official Twitter/X account. The episode was re-uploaded to YouTube on March 15, 2022, with the controversial content removed and replaced with the characters wearing lion-themed costumes with animal printed tops of their image colors.

==== Episodes ====
No.	Title	Original release date
1	"Speaking of After Practice"; Transliteration: "Renshū no Ato to Ieba" (Japanese: 練習の後といえば)	January 13, 2022
2	"Fight! Nenenger V"; Transliteration: "Tatakae! Nenengā V" (Japanese: 戦え！ネネンガーV)	January 20, 2022
3	"An Idol's Talent"; Transliteration: "Aidoru no Sainō" (Japanese: アイドルの才能)	January 27, 2022
4	"Kohane's Street Debut!"; Transliteration: "Kohane Sutorīto DEBUT!" (Japanese: こはね寿鳥糸DEBUT！)	February 3, 2022
5	"Can We Stop With 25:00?"; Transliteration: "25ji Yamenai?" (Japanese: 25時やめない？)	February 10, 2022
6	"Leo/need Style"; Transliteration: "Reonīdo Sutairu" (Japanese: レオニードスタイル)	February 17, 2022; March 15, 2022 (YouTube reupload)
7	"Across the Time and Space, Wonderhoy~!"; Transliteration: "Jikū o Koete Wandaho~i!" (Japanese: 時空を超えてわんだほーい！)	February 24, 2022
8	"Get Viral, MMJ!"; Transliteration: "Bazure! Momojan!" (Japanese: バズれ！ モモジャン！)	March 3, 2022
9	"The Rumored Pancake"; Transliteration: "Uwasa no Pankēki" (Japanese: 噂のパンケーキ)	March 10, 2022
10	"An Instant Noodle Episode"; Transliteration: "Kappu Rāmen Kai" (Japanese: カップラーメン回)	March 17, 2022

=== Short animation series ===
Another short animated series was announced during the 3rd anniversary Wondershow Channel Livestream called "Journey to Bloom", which summarizes each unit's main story. The series was available for free to watch through the game's official YouTube channel. Official English subtitles are made available sometime after the official premiere. The series was produced by P.A. Works, and was directed by Hiroyuki Hata.

No.	Title (Note: All episode titles are stylized in all-caps surrounded by white corner brackets.)	Original release date
1	"Stella"	September 30, 2023
2	"Hope"	October 7, 2023
3	"Resolve"	October 14, 2023
4	"Happiness"	October 21, 2023
5	"Self"	October 28, 2023

=== Anime film ===
An anime film titled Colorful Stage! The Movie: A Miku Who Can't Sing (劇場版プロジェクトセカイ 壊れたセカイと歌えないミク, Gekijōban Purojekuto Sekai: Kowareta Sekai to Utaenai Miku) was announced on July 29, 2024. It was first teased as a "new project" on July 21, 2024, which shows an unfamiliar variant of Hatsune Miku. The film tells an original story featuring all original characters, as well as Virtual Singers. One member saw an "Unknown" Miku, who confesses that there are people she wants to reach something, no matter how much she sings, her voice can't reach them. Miku thinks that by knowing closer about these people, she will be able to reach the people she wants to reach.

P.A. Works produced the film with direction by Hiroyuki Hata and screenplay by Yoko Yonaiyama. Yuki Akiyama designed the characters, and Satoshi Hōno composed the music. It premiered in Japanese theaters on January 17, 2025. A global release has been confirmed. The opening song by 40mp and Sasakure.UK titled "Hajimari no Mirai" (はじまりの未来) features vocals by Hatsune Miku, and the ending song by Jin titled "Worlders" with an arrangement by TeddyLoid is performed by all 26 characters.

The film also featured six new songs that were composed by Deco*27, with each one arranged by six different Vocaloid producers. The songs for each unit were:

- SToRY: vocals by Leo/need, arranged by kemu
- FUN!!: vocals by More More Jump!, arranged by Iyowa
- Fire Dance (ファイアダンス): vocals by Vivid Bad Squad, arranged by Giga
- Smile*Symphony (スマイル*シンフォニー): vocals by Wonderlands x Showtime, arranged by Niru Kajitsu
- Light That Dwells Here (そこに在る、光。): vocals by Nightcord at 25:00, arranged by Surii
- Hello Sekai (ハローセカイ): vocals by Virtual Singers (Vocaloids), arranged by tepe

The movie grossed up to US$2.8 million during its opening week in the United States of America, and placed itself in seventh for weekend ticket sales, exceeding the film's domestic performance of 300 million yen.

Promotional cards featuring the cast using the new outfits that were released alongside the movie and were only obtainable through special codes given away at certain screenings. Special CDs featuring each unit's song created for the movie, along with other merchandise such as photocards, were also released in this matter. The songs created for the movie were added to Spotify at a later date. The movie's original SEKAI was also added, but this, like the cards, could only be obtained by special codes.

== Other media ==
=== Printed media ===
An anthology comic was released on November 25, 2021, by Ichijinsha's DNA Media Comics. Official fan books in the style of the game's yearly anniversary, are released after a certain rotation of commission songs. The first volume of the visual fan books was released in November 26, 2021. This was followed by four additional volumes, released April 19th, 2022, June 27th, 2023, September 17th, 2024, and May 26th, 2026, respectively.

=== Real-life events ===
==== Concerts ====
The game has held two types of live concerts: Sekai Symphony and Colorful Live.

Sekai Symphony (セカイシンフォニー) is an annual orchestra concert for the songs that have been featured in the game. It is held annually held at Pacifico Yokohama and is performed by Sekai Symphony Special Band of Tokyo Philharmonic Orchestra. The first concert, held on October 16, 2021, featured Tsukasa Tenma and Nene Kusanagi's voice actors Daisuke Hirose and Machico as guests. The second concert was held on June 11, 2022, featuring the voice actresses of Nightcord at 25:00 (Tomori Kusunoki, Rui Tanabe, Minori Suzuki, and Hinata Sato) as guests. The third concert was held on June 10, 2023, featuring Ichika Hoshino and Saki Tenma's voice actresses Ruriko Noguchi and Karin Isobe as guests. The fourth concert was held on June 8, 2024, featuring the voice actors of Vivid Bad Squad (Akina, Tomomi Jiena Sumi, Fumiya Imai, and Kent Itō) as guests. The fifth concert was held on June 15, 2025, with the voice actresses of More More Jump!, excluding Furihata Ai, (Yui Ogura, Yoshioka Mayu, and Honizumi Rina) as guests.

Colorful Live is a live concert featuring characters from the game in a hologram, a 3D model that is different from the one seen in the game. It follows the nature of Magical Mirai, an original Miku-centered live concert, where all 26 characters (featuring 20 original characters, plus 6 Virtual Singers) will sing and dance along with real-life band performers. The first concert, titled Colorful Live 1st -Link- was held on January 28–30, 2022 at Makuhari Messe. There was also paid live stream held on Abema TV. The fifth concert, Colorful Live 5th -Frontier-, was held from December 12–14, 2025 in Osaka, and from January 23–25, 2026 in Tokyo, at the Intex Osaka Building and Makuhari Messe respectively. Additional goods are also available upon purchasing a Premium Seat ticket. These goods include a card holder, an acrylic mirror, an acrylic title badge, and a SONOCA card containing one live audio track from the concert. This concert is also available on Abema TV for an additional fee.

==== Anniversary event ====
An annual event called Project Sekai Thanks Festival (Note: Japanese: Project Sekai Kanshasai (プロジェクトセカイ感謝祭)) is held in late September to celebrate the game's anniversary, September 30. Many of the original characters' voice actors and actresses make appearances in the event, performing in a mini concert and reading act. Some perform as the hosts in a special edition of Sekai Broadcast Livestream, (Note: Called Wondershow Channel Livestream before game's 3rd anniversary.) a talk show, as well as Sekai Radio. An exhibition is also set up inside the venue. The event was first held to celebrate the game's upcoming second anniversary, which was held on September 23–24, 2022, at Tachikawa Stage Garden. The second event was held at Tokyo Dome City Hall on September 16–17, 2023. The third event was held on September 27–28, 2024, at Yokohama Buntai.

The fifth event, the 5th Anniversary Thanks Festival, was held at the Tokyo Garden Theater with an outdoor exhibition located at the Sports Entertainment Plaza. The event was held from October 18–19, 2025, and featured appearances from 17 of the franchise's 20 voice actors. The voice actors who did not attend were Ueda Reina, voice of Mochizuki Honami, Hina Kino, voice of Otori Emu, and Imai Fumiya, voice of Shinonome Akito. Promotional food and drink based on the game were sold in kitchen cars at the event; these included yakisoba-pan, onigiri, and a drink inspired by the bonus energy drinks obtainable in the game. Coasters featuring the groups, along with a coaster featuring the entire cast, were given away with the food and drink. A purchase limit of three of each item per customer was put into place during the event. Promotional merchandise for the event was also released, which included a light stick cover, badges, and acrylic standees among other items.

An esports competition was held alongside the event, known as the Project Sekai Championship 2025. Players competed for a collective purse of 1,000,000 yen, with first place receiving 500,000 yen, second place receiving 300,000 yen, and third and fourth place both receiving 100,000 yen.

==== Creators Festa ====
An event that "connects fans and creators" which features Vocaloid Producers and Vocaloid-related illustrators, has been held annually since 2023. Similar to Comiket, this is where creators tend to their own booth and sell a variety of goods. There's also official merch and goods featuring the main characters and Virtual Singers.

== See also ==
- BanG Dream! Girls Band Party! – Game developed by Craft Egg, the parent company of Colorful Palette
- Crypton Future Media
- Vocaloid
