= 17th Seiyu Awards =

2023 voice acting award in Tokyo

- Awarded for: Voice acting in Japan
- Date: March 11, 2023
- Location: JOQR Media Plus Hall; Minato, Tokyo
- Country: Japan

Highlights
- Best Lead Actors: Chika Anzai; Takuya Eguchi; Atsumi Tanezaki
- Best Supporting Actors: Shūichi Ikeda; Ryotaro Okiayu; Atsumi Tanezaki
- Website: www.seiyuawards.jp

The 17th Seiyu Awards was held on March 11, 2023, at the JOQR Media Plus Hall in Minato, Tokyo. The winners of the Merit Awards, the Kei Tomiyama Award, the Kazue Takahashi Award, and the Synergy Award were announced on February 21, 2023. The rest of the winners were announced on the ceremony day. Starting this year, "Best Lead Voice Actor," "Best Supporting Voice Actor," and "New Voice Actor" will no longer be separated by gender.

Winners	Agency	Highlight Works
Best Actors in a Leading Role
Chika Anzai	Avex Pictures	Chisato Nishikigi (Lycoris Recoil)
Takuya Eguchi	81 Produce	Loid Forger (Spy × Family)
Atsumi Tanezaki	Haikyō	Anya Forger (Spy × Family) Sajuna Inui (My Dress-Up Darling)
Best Actors in Supporting Roles
Shūichi Ikeda	Haikyō	Red-Haired Shanks (One Piece Film: Red)
Ryōtarō Okiayu	Aoni Production	Zhuge Kongming (Ya Boy Kongming!) Byakuya Kuchiki (Bleach: Thousand-Year Blood War)
Atsumi Tanezaki	Haikyō	Sajuna Inui (My Dress-Up Darling)
Best New Actors
Shūichirō Umeda	Ken Production	Izumi (Shikimori's Not Just a Cutie)
Hina Suguta	Animo Produce	Marin Kitagawa (My Dress-Up Darling)
Anna Nagase	81 Produce	Ushio Kofune (Summer Time Rendering)
Minami Hinata	Axl One	Luminaria (She Professed Herself Pupil of the Wise Man)
Shion Wakayama	Himawari Theatre Group	Takina Inoue (Lycoris Recoil)
Singing Award
Winner	Agency	
Nijigasaki High School Idol Club	Bandai Namco Music Live	

Merit Award
Winners	Agency
Chikako	Ritrovo
Yūsaku Yara	Aoni Production
Kei Tomiyama Memorial Award
Winner	Agency
Junichi Suwabe	Haikyō
Kazue Takahashi Memorial Award
Winner	Agency
Maria Kawamura	Freelance
Synergy Award
Winner
Jujutsu Kaisen
Special Honor Award
Winner
Let's Make a Mug Too
Kids/Family Award
Winner	Agency
Ikue Ōtani	Mausu Promotion
Rica Matsumoto	Matsurica
Foreign Movie/Series Award
Winner	Agency
Shihori Kanjiya	Asia Business Partners
Toshiyuki Morikawa	Axl-One
Influencer Award
Winner	Agency
Natsuki Hanae	Across Entertainment
Most Valuable Seiyū Award
Winner	Agency
Takuya Eguchi	81 Produce

== Not awarded ==
These awards were not given and were listed as N/A on their website.

- Personality Award
- Game Award
