= Taiga Takano =

Japanese voice actor (born 1999)

- 高野 大河
- Born: 1 September 1999 (age 26)
- Occupation: Voice actor
- Employer: 81 Produce
- Notable work: Binan Kōkō Chikyū Bōei-bu Haikara! as Shinkurō Unzen
- Awards: Seiyu Awards Best New Actor Award (2026)

Taiga Takano (Japanese: 高野 大河, Hepburn: Takano Taiga; born 1 September 1999) is a Japanese voice actor from Sapporo, affiliated with 81 Produce. After a brief career as a child stage actor in the Sapporo area, he starred in Binan Kōkō Chikyū Bōei-bu Haikara! as Shinkurō Unzen and in 2026 won the 20th Seiyu Awards Best New Actor Award.

== Biography ==
Takano, a native of Sapporo, was born on 1 September 1999. Around the time of his later years in elementary school, he began taking lessons in hip-hop dance at his parents' suggestion. While he was in sixth grade, the Shiki Theatre Company held a production of The Lion King, and he successfully passed an audition for their role of young Simba; he later recalled in an interview that this experience helped him "realize how much fun it is to become someone else and express myself using my voice and body". He later joined local theater troupe Fruit Basket.

After taking a break from acting to attend university, Takano decided to become a voice actor while pondering his future career plans. After several failures at several open-call voice acting competitions, he took up the offer to participate at the 16th Seiyu Awards' Newcomer Discovery Audition, where he received job offers from seven agencies. He subsequently moved to Tokyo and began his voice acting career. He officially joined 81 Produce on 1 April 2023, and he had minor roles in Atri: My Dear Moments, Duel Masters Lost, Kinokoinu: Mushroom Pup, and Mix.

In April 2025, it was announced that Takano would star as Shinkurō Unzen in Binan Kōkō Chikyū Bōei-bu Haikara!. He also voiced one of the brainwashed people in the 12th episode of Witch Watch. In 2026, he won the Seiyu Awards Best New Actor Award at the 20th Seiyu Awards.

== Filmography ==
=== Television animation ===
Year	Title	Role	Ref
2023	Mix	Boxing club member	
2024	Atri: My Dear Moments	Shopping District residents	
2024	Kinokoinu: Mushroom Pup	Cameraman	
2025	April Showers Bring May Flowers	Male student A	
2025	Classic Stars		
2025	Binan Kōkō Chikyū Bōei-bu Haikara!	Shinkurō Unzen	
2025	I Got Married to the Girl I Hate Most in Class	Male student B	
2025	Mono	Host	
2025	Witch Watch	Brainwashed man	
2026	Beyblade X	Hina's friend	

=== Original net animation ===
Year	Title	Role	Ref
2024	Duel Masters Lost	Camper C	

=== Video games ===
Year	Title	Role	Ref
2025	Inazuma Eleven: Victory Road	Joss Fool, Chroma	
	Disney Twisted-Wonderland	Golden Trident Player	
	Genshin Impact	Prisoner, Camden, Chamborduc	
	Hatsune Miku: Colorful Stage!		
