= 7th Seiyu Awards =

Japanese voice acting awards

- Awarded for: Voice acting in Japan
- Date: March 2, 2013
- Location: JOQR Media Plus Hall; Minato, Tokyo
- Country: Japan

Highlights
- Best Lead Actor: Yūki Kaji
- Best Lead Actress: Kana Asumi
- Website: www.seiyuawards.jp

The 7th Seiyu Awards ceremony was held on March 2, 2013 in Tokyo.

Winners	Agency	Character	Anime
Best Actor in leading role
Yūki Kaji	Arts Vision	Issei Hyōdō	High School DxD
Best Actress in leading role
Kana Asumi	81 Produce	Nyaruko	Haiyore! Nyaruko-san
Best Actors in supporting roles
Yūki Ono	Atomic Monkey	Kaname Tsukahara	Kimi to Boku 2
Junichi Suwabe	Haikyō	Seiji Matoba	Natsume Yūjin-chō Shi
Best Actresses in supporting roles
Sayaka Ohara	Haikyō	Irisviel von Einzbern	Fate/Zero
Haruka Tomatsu	Music Ray'n	Asuna Yūki	Sword Art Online
Best Rookie actors
Nobunaga Shimazaki	Aoni Production	Kaito Kirishima	Ano Natsu de Matteru
Kazutomi Yamamoto	Production Ace	Kio Asuno	Mobile Suit Gundam AGE
Best Rookie actresses
Kaori Ishihara	Style Cube	Aladdin	Magi: The Labyrinth of Magic
Rumi Ōkubo	81 Produce	Chinatsu Yoshikawa	YuruYuri♪♪
Best Personality
Winner	Agency	Radio Program	Broadcasting Station
Mitsuo Iwata	Office Osawa	Tobidase!! Sweet Ignition	OBC
Best Musical Performance
Winners		Record Label	
Ushirokara Haiyoritai G (Kana Asumi, Miyu Matsuki, Yuka Ōtsubo)		DIVEIIentertainment	
Winners		Agency	
Special Achievement Award
Takeshi Aono		Aoni Production (final career)	
Achievement Award
Shinsuke Chikaishi		Mouvement	
Masako Nozawa		Aoni Production	
Synergy Award
Tatsunoko Production's 50th Anniversary (Tōru Ōhira, Katsuji Mori, Mari Okamoto, Noriko Ohara)
Kei Tomiyama Memorial Award (Topical Award)
Yūji Mitsuya		Combination	
Kids Family Award
Mayumi Tanaka		Aoni Production	
Kazue Takahashi Memorial Award
Megumi Ogata		NEVERLAND ARTS	
Most Votes Award
Hiroshi Kamiya		Aoni Production	
