= 20th Seiyu Awards =

2026 Japanese voice acting awards

- Awarded for: Voice acting in Japan
- Date: March 15, 2026
- Location: JOQR Media Plus Hall; Minato, Tokyo
- Country: Japan

Highlights
- Best Lead Actors: Kikunosuke Toya; Shion Wakayama
- Best Supporting Actors: Shinji Kawada; Mayumi Tanaka; Reina Ueda
- Website: www.seiyuawards.jp

The 20th Seiyu Awards was held on March 15, 2026, at the JOQR Media Plus Hall in Minato, Tokyo. The winners of the Merit Awards, the Kei Tomiyama Award, the Kazue Takahashi Award, the Synergy Award, and the Special Award were announced on February 17, 2026. The rest of the winners were announced on the ceremony day.

Winners	Agency
Best Actors in a Leading Role
Kikunosuke Toya	Sony Music Artists
Shion Wakayama	Himawari Theatre Group
Best Actors in Supporting Roles
Shinji Kawada	Ken Production
Mayumi Tanaka	Aoni Production
Reina Ueda	81 Produce
Yukari Tamura	Amuleto
Best New Actors
Minori Fujidera	Avex Picture
Hana Hishikawa	Raccoon Dog
Taihi Kimura	Ken Production
Haruna Mikawa	Ken Production
Manatsu Murakami	81 Produce
Yoshinori Nakayama	Ancheri
Taiga Takano	81 Produce
Momoka Terasawa	Sigma Seven

Singing Award
AiScReam
Merit Award
Aruno Tahara
Keiko Yokozawa
Kei Tomiyama Memorial Award
Shinichiro Kamio
Kazue Takahashi Memorial Award
Rei Sakuma
Game Award
Fate/Grand Order
Synergy Award
The Idolmaster
Special Honor Award
Nami Mizuno
Kids/Family Award
Lilo & Stitch
Foreign Movie/Series Award
Matsuya Onoe
Maaya Sakamoto
Mutsumi Tamura
Personality Award
Yōko Hikasa
Most Valuable Seiyū Award
Akira Ishida
