= Chikako Akimoto =

Japanese voice actress

- 秋元 千賀子
- Born: 17 December 1949 (age 76)
- Occupation: Voice actress
- Notable work: Ippatsu Kanta-kun as Ichirō Tobase

Chikako Akimoto (Japanese: 秋元 千賀子, Hepburn: Akimoto Chikako; born 17 December 1949) is a Japanese voice actress from Hokkaido, affiliated with Ritrovo. She is known for voicing Ichirō Tobase, the main character of Ippatsu Kanta-kun. She was awarded the Seiyu Awards Merit Award in 2023.

== Biography ==
Chikako Akimoto, a native of Hokkaido, was born on 17 December 1949. She was educated at the TV Talent Center.

Akimoto was the first voice actor of Hanako Hanazawa in Sazae-san. She later voiced Ichirō Tobase, the main character of Ippatsu Kanta-kun. Later, she would later voice other characters in anime, including Kayo Takeo in Invincible Robo Trider G7, Lotte Lehmann in Trapp Family Story, Weigenthaler in The Two Lottes, Versch in My Patrasche, Jessica in Turn A Gundam, Kishida in You're Under Arrest, Regina Bergman in A Little Snow Fairy Sugar, Chigusa Iinuma in Eden of the East, and Zeruel's mom in You're Being Summoned, Azazel.

In 2023, she was awarded the Seiyu Awards Merit Award at the 17th Seiyu Awards.

Among her hobbies and special skills are Mizuki-ryū nihon-buyō and urasenke.

== Filmography ==
=== Anime television ===
- Sazae-san, Hanako Hanazawa (1969)
- Ippatsu Kanta-kun, Ichirō Tobase (1977)
- Invincible Robo Trider G7, Kayo Takeo (1980)
- Lucy-May of the Southern Rainbow, Mrs. Mac (1982)
- Trapp Family Story, Lotte Lehmann (1991)
- The Two Lottes, Weigenthaler (1991)
- My Patrasche, Versch (1992)
- Famous Dog Lassie, woman in farming (1996)
- Turn A Gundam, Jessica (1999)
- Weekly Storyland, Narration (1999)
- You're Under Arrest, Kishida (2001)
- A Little Snow Fairy Sugar, Regina Bergman (2001)
- Pita-Ten, matron (2002)
- Eden of the East, Chigusa Iinuma (2009)
- You're Being Summoned, Azazel, Zeruel's mom (2011)

== Awards and nominations ==
Year	Award	Result	Ref.
2023	Seiyu Awards Merit Award	Won	
