= Seiyu Award for Best Actress in a Leading Role =

Japanese voice acting award

- Awarded for: Best Performance by an Actress in a Leading Role
- Country: Japan
- First award: 2007
- Final award: 2022
- Last held by: Megumi Ogata (2022)
- Website: https://seiyuawards.jp/
- Related: Seiyu Award for Best Actors in a Leading Role

The Seiyu Award for Best Actress in a Leading Role is one of the awards at the Seiyu Awards. Starting in 2023, "Best Lead Voice Actor" is no longer separated by gender.

== Winners ==
Winners	Agency	Characters	Anime	Ref
2007
Romi Park	Theatrical group En	Nana Osaki	NANA	
2008
Aya Hirano	Space Craft	Haruhi Suzumiya	The Melancholy of Haruhi Suzumiya	
Aya Hirano	Space Craft	Konata Izumi	Lucky Star	
2009
Rie Kugimiya	I'm Enterprise	Taiga Aisaka	Toradora!	
Rie Kugimiya	I'm Enterprise	Miharu Rokujo	Nabari no Ou	
2010
Miyuki Sawashiro	Mausu Promotion	Canaan	Canaan	
Miyuki Sawashiro	Mausu Promotion	Lag Seeing	Tegami Bachi	
2011
Aki Toyosaki	Music Ray'n	Yui Hirasawa	K-On!	
2012
Aoi Yūki	Pro-Fit	Madoka Kaname	Puella Magi Madoka Magica	
Aoi Yūki	Pro-Fit	Victorique de Blois	Gosick	
Aoi Yūki	Pro-Fit	Tōru Ichii	A-Channel	
2013
Kana Asumi	81 Produce	Nyaruko	Haiyore! Nyaruko-san	
2014
Rina Satō	Haikyō	Mikoto Misaka	A Certain Scientific Railgun S	
2015
Sayaka Kanda	Fantic	Nadeshiko Adenokouji	Good Luck Girl!	
2016
Inori Minase	Sony Music Artists	Jun Naruse	The Anthem of the Heart	
Inori Minase	Sony Music Artists	Yuki Takeya	School-Live!	
2017
Mone Kamishiraishi	TOHO Entertainment	Mitsuha Miyamizu	Your Name	
2018
Tomoyo Kurosawa	Mausu Promotion	Phosphophyllite	Land of the Lustrous	
Tomoyo Kurosawa	Mausu Promotion	Kumiko Oumae	Sound! Euphonium: The Movie – May the Melody Reach You!	
2019
Yūko Sanpei	Axl-One	Boruto Uzumaki	Boruto: Naruto Next Generations	
2020
Aoi Koga	81 Produce	Kaguya Shinomiya	Kaguya-sama: Love is War	
2021
Yui Ishikawa	mitt management	Violet Evergarden	Violet Evergarden: The Movie	
2022
Megumi Ogata	Breathe Arts	Shinji Ikari	Evangelion: 3.0+1.0 Thrice Upon a Time	
