= Seiyu Award for Best Actors in a Supporting Roles (2007-2022) =

Japanese voice acting award

- Awarded for: Best Performance by Actors in a Supporting Roles
- Country: Japan
- First award: March 3, 2007; 19 years ago
- Final award: March 11, 2022; 4 years ago
- Last held by: Fumihiko Tachiki and Yūichi Nakamura (2022)
- Website: https://seiyuawards.jp/
- Related: Seiyu Award for Best Actors in a Supporting Roles (2023-present)

The Seiyu Award for Best Actor in a Leading Role is one of the awards at the Seiyu Awards. Starting in 2023, "Best Lead Voice Actor" is no longer separated by gender.

Winners	Agency	Characters	Anime	Ref
2007
Akira Ishida	Mausu Promotion	Athrun Zala	Mobile Suit Gundam Seed Destiny	
Kōki Miyata	81 Produce	Kazumi Yoshinaga	Yoshinaga-san Chi no Gargoyle	
2008
Daisuke Ono	Mausu Promotion	Hosaka; Kagezaki	Minami-ke; Rental Magica	
Hiroshi Kamiya	Aoni Production	Tieria Erde; Nozomu Itoshiki	Mobile Suit Gundam 00; Sayonara Zetsubō Sensei	
2009
Kazuhiko Inoue	B-Box	Madara/Cat	Natsume Yujincho	
Tomokazu Sugita	Atomic Monkey	Kivat-bat the 3rd Leon Mishima; Raven	Kamen Rider Kiva; Macross Frontier; Hakushaku to Yosei	
2010
Daisuke Namikawa	Across Entertainment	Mikage; Shota Kazehaya	07-Ghost; Kimi ni Todoke	
Shin-ichiro Miki	81 Produce	Roy Mustang; Lockon Stratos	Fullmetal Alchemist; Mobile Suit Gundam 00	
2011
Nobuhiko Okamoto	Pro-Fit	Takumi Usui; Eiji Niizuma; Accelerator	Kaichō wa Maid-sama! Bakuman; Toaru Majutsu no Index II	
Kazuya Nakai	Aoni Production	Roronoa Zoro; Hijikata Toshirō	One Piece; Gintama	
2012
Ryōhei Kimura	Himawari Theatre Group	Kuga Aki; Kodaka Hasegawa; Satoru Nishimura	Kamisama Dolls; Haganai; Natsume Yūjinchō San	
Mamoru Miyano	Himawari Theatre Group	Tokiya Ichinose; Taichi Mashima; Rintarō Okabe	Uta no Prince-sama Maji Love 1000% Chihayafuru; Steins;Gate	
2013
Yūki Ono	Atomic Monkey	Kaname Tsukahara	Kimi to Boku 2	
Junichi Suwabe	Haikyō	Seiji Matoba	Natsume Yūjin-chō Shi	
2014
Yoshimasa Hosoya	Mausu Promotion	Yusuke Asahina	Brothers Conflict	
2015
Katsuyuki Konishi	Ken Production	Ritsu Kisaragi	La Corda d'Oro Blue Sky	
Toshiyuki Morikawa	Axl-One	Hijikata Toshizō	Bakumatsu Rock	
2016
Kenichi Suzumura	INTENTION	Hirari Abeno	Laughing Under the Clouds	
Kenichi Suzumura	INTENTION	Iyami	Mr. Osomatsu	
Yoshimasa Hosoya	freelance	Orga Itsuka	Mobile Suit Gundam: Iron-Blooded Orphans	
Yoshimasa Hosoya	freelance	Ginti	Death Parade	
2017
Hōchū Ōtsuka	Crazy Box	Satō	Ajin: Demi-Human	
2018
Junichi Suwabe	Haikyō	Viktor Nikiforov	Yuri on Ice	
Junichi Suwabe	Haikyō	Archer	Fate/stay night: Heaven's Feel I. presage flower	
2019
Tōru Furuya	Aoni Production	Rei Furuya	Case Closed	
Kenta Miyake	81 Produce	All Might	My Hero Academia 3	
2020
Kaito Ishikawa	Pro-Fit	Naofumi Iwatani	The Rising of the Shield Hero	
Kaito Ishikawa	Pro-Fit	Tobio Kageyama	Haikyuu!!	
Makoto Furukawa	Toy's Factory	Miyuki Shirogane	Kaguya-sama: Love is War	
2021
Takehito Koyasu	T's Factory	Roswaal L. Mathers	Re:Zero − Starting Life in Another World	
Nobunaga Shimazaki	Aoni Production	Yuki Sōma	Fruits Basket 2nd Season	
2022
Fumihiko Tachiki	Office Osawa	Gendo Ikari	Evangelion: 3.0+1.0 Thrice Upon a Time	
Fumihiko Tachiki	Office Osawa	Taizo Hasegawa	Gintama: The Very Final	
Yūichi Nakamura	INTENTION	Satoru Gojo	Jujutsu Kaisen	
Yūichi Nakamura	INTENTION	Yuichi Jin	World Trigger	
