= 3rd Seiyu Awards =

Voice acting award ceremony, Japan 2009

- Awarded for: Voice acting in Japan
- Date: March 7, 2009
- Location: UDX Theater; Akihabara, Tokyo
- Country: Japan

Highlights
- Best Lead Actor: Hiroshi Kamiya
- Best Lead Actress: Rie Kugimiya
- Website: www.seiyuawards.jp

The 3rd Seiyu Awards ceremony was held on March 7, 2009, at the UDX Theater in Akihabara, Tokyo, and was broadcast on BS11 on May 3, 2009. The period of general voting lasted from October 1, 2008, to January 1, 2009.

Winners	Agency	Characters	Anime
Best Actor in leading role
Hiroshi Kamiya	Aoni Production	Takashi Natsume	Natsume Yujincho
Best Actress in leading role
Rie Kugimiya	I'm Enterprise	Taiga Aisaka; Miharu Rokujo	Toradora; Nabari no Ou
Best Actors in supporting roles
Kazuhiko Inoue	B-Box	Madara/Cat	Natsume Yujincho
Tomokazu Sugita	Atomic Monkey	Kivat-bat the 3rd Leon Mishima; Raven	Kamen Rider Kiva; Macross Frontier; Hakushaku to Yosei
Best Actresses in supporting roles
Aya Endo	Performing Art Center	Sheryl Nome; Angelique; Matsu	Macross Frontier; Neo Angelique ~Abyss~; Sekirei
Miyuki Sawashiro	Mausu Promotion	Asako Shibasaki; Tsugumi Aoba; Jun Kanzato; Satoru Yamashita	Toshokan Senso; Kannagi: Crazy Shrine Maidens; PERSONA -trinity soul- Linebarrels of Iron
Best Rookie actors
Nobuhiko Okamoto	Pro-Fit	Shin Kanzato; Ryuji Kuhoin; Accelerator	PERSONA -trinity soul- Kure-nai; Toaru Majutsu no Index
Yuki Kaji	Arts Vision	Akina Hiizumu; Finnian	Yozakura Quartet; Kuroshitsuji
Best Rookie actresses
Kana Asumi	81 Produce	Yuno; Natsumi Hirakawa	Hidamari Sketch 365; Kyo no Go no Ni
Haruka Tomatsu	Music Ray'n	Shiho Sannomiya; Nagi; Lala Satalin Deviluke	Zettai Karen Children; Kannagi: Crazy Shrine Maidens; To Love-Ru
Best Personality
Winner	Agency	Radio Programs	Broadcasting Station
Hiroshi Kamiya	Aoni Production	Dear Girl -Stories- Macross F Sayonara Zetsubo Hoso	JOQR; JOQR; Internet radio
Best Musical Performance
Winners	Record Label	Song	Anime
Megumi Nakajima	flying DOG	Seikan Hiko	Macross Frontier
Special Achievement Award
Winners	Agency		
Reiko Muto	Aoni Production (final career)		
Achievement Award
Kenji Utsumi	Ken Production		
Kosei Tomita	Production Baobab		
Ichiro Nagai	Aoni Production		
Synergy Award
Astro Boy (Mari Shimizu, Yōko Mizugaki, Hisashi Katsuta)
Kei Tomiyama Memorial Award (Topical Award)
Koichi Yamadera	Across Entertainment		
Overseas Fan's Award
Jun Fukuyama	Production Baobab		
