= A Little Snow Fairy Sugar =

2001 television anime

- Cover art from the A Little Snow Fairy Sugar DVD Complete Series release

ちっちゃな雪使いシュガー (Chitchana Yukitsukai Shugā)
- Genre: Comedy, Fantasy, Slice of Life
- Created by: Haruka Aoi
- Anime television series
- Directed by: Shinichiro Kimura
- Written by: Yasunori Yamada
- Music by: Shinkichi Mitsumune
- Studio: J.C.Staff
- Licensed by: NA: Sentai Filmworks
- Original network: TBS, BS-i, TBS Channel, RKB
- English network: Anime Network
- Original run: October 2, 2001 – March 26, 2002
- Episodes: 24
- Manga
- Written by: Botan Hanayashiki
- Published by: Kadokawa Shoten
- English publisher: NA: ADV Manga; UK: ADV Manga
- Magazine: Dragon Junior
- Original run: 2001 – 2002
- Volumes: 3
- Original video animation

Summer Special
- Directed by: Shinichiro Kimura
- Written by: Yasunori Yamada
- Music by: Shinkichi Mitsumune
- Studio: J.C.Staff
- Licensed by: NA: Sentai Filmworks
- Released: August 21, 2003 – August 28, 2003
- Episodes: 2

A Little Snow Fairy Sugar (ちっちゃな雪使いシュガー, Chitchana Yukitsukai Shugā) is a Japanese anime series developed by J.C.Staff. It premiered in Japan on TBS on October 2, 2001, and ran for 24 episodes until its conclusion March 26, 2002. A two-episode OVA was also released for the series. The series was licensed for North America by Geneon Entertainment, but after the closure of Geneon, its DVD releases went out of print and later in 2009, Sentai Filmworks had acquired the license.

A related manga series written and illustrated by Botan Hanayashiki under the name "BH Snow+Clinic" was also released. Originally serialized in the shōnen manga magazine Dragon Junior, the individual chapters were published in three tankōbon volumes by Kadokawa Shoten.

== Plot ==
The story is based around 11-year-old Saga Bergman, a young girl in a small German town called Muhlenberg (based on real town of Rothenburg ob der Tauber). Saga lives with her grandmother Regina and works in a coffee shop when not in school. Saga is extremely structured and plans her life down to the minute. One day, she notices a tiny creature in a fluffy outfit that appears to be starving. She offers it a waffle, which helps revive the tiny creature. Saga learns that this tiny creature is Sugar, an apprentice season fairy. Sugar explains that season fairies alter the weather by playing a magical musical instrument, and her specialty is snow, which she creates by playing the piccolo. Sugar is joined by two more apprentice season fairies, Salt, an outgoing male fairy who plays the trumpet to make the sun shine more brightly, and Pepper, a quiet and caring female fairy who plays the harp to make the wind blow.

All three apprentices are shocked at the realization that Saga can see them, since humans are not supposed to be able to see season fairies. Pepper speculates that exceptional humans might be able to see them, which is the best possible explanation. Sugar tells Saga that the three have been sent to Earth to train as full-fledged season fairies, and to do that, they must find 'Twinkles'.

Sugar moves into Saga's bedroom and sets up residence, much to the consternation of the super-structured Saga. Saga is a well-meaning, intelligent and highly organized girl who feels compelled to look after the childish, loud and irresponsible Sugar, who is incapable of looking after herself. The story is complicated further with the arrival of three adult season fairies—Turmeric, a cloud fairy; Ginger, a rain fairy; and the Elder, the leader of the season fairies—and two more apprentices—Cinnamon, a hail fairy, and Basil, a thunder fairy.

With the highly disruptive presence of Sugar, Saga's life goes haywire. Her friends Norma and Anne think that she is losing her mind, and her teacher, Miss Hanna, is worried that her best student is acting strangely. Not at all concerned with her strange behavior is Greta, an egotistical rich girl who considers Saga to be her rival, and Phil, a goofy inventor who keeps trying to persuade Saga to help him with his experiments, if he is not already busy building and trying out his latest device.

== Characters ==
Sugar
Voiced by: Tomoko Kawakami (Japanese); Rebecca Forstadt (as Reba West) (English); Rona Aguilar (Tagalog)

Sugar is a female snow fairy apprentice working to learn how to be a full-fledged fairy. She comes to the human world for the final part of her training which requires her to find a so-called "Twinkle". Sugar acts much like a toddler with a clumsy nature who often tries her best at things but messes up because she doesn't always think things through. She loves to kiss anyone she is fond of when happy. After Saga first feeds her a waffle, she comes to love them, though she mispronounces their name as "waffo". In the manga adaptation, she was familiar with the word before eating one.

Saga Bergman
Voiced by: Masumi Asano (Japanese); Michelle Ruff (English); Hazel Hernan (Tagalog)

Age: 11. Saga Bergman is the main protagonist of the series. Her mother died in an accident, so she lives with her grandmother. Saga is somewhat obsessed with planning, scheduling her day nearly to the minute and is frustrated when her plans go off schedule. She can be quick to lose her temper when she deals with Sugar, however, she is actually very kind and quite mature for her age. Saga works in a coffee shop and regularly stops at the local music store to play her mother's piano.

Salt
Voiced by: Tomo Saeki (Japanese); Brianne Siddall (English); Rowena Benavidez–Lazaro (Tagalog)

Salt is a male apprentice sun fairy and another of Sugar's friends who come to the human world with her to find a "Twinkle". Salt initially wishes to be a sun fairy like his father, but after meeting Turmeric, he decides he wants to be a cloud fairy.

Pepper
Voiced by: Kaori Mizuhashi (Japanese); Lara Cody (as Lara Curci) (English); Grace Cornel (Tagalog)

Pepper is a female apprentice wind fairy and one of Sugar's friends who also comes to the human world to find a "Twinkle". She lives in the house of a veterinarian who has a newborn baby, who she tries to care for and plays lullabies to on her harp. Calm, gentle, and polite, she is humble about her abilities and is capable of talking to animals.

Greta
Voiced by: Chinami Nishimura (Japanese); Stephanie Sheh (English); Grace Cornel (Tagalog)

Greta is Saga's self-proclaimed rival. The spoiled daughter of a rich family, she can be arrogant and boastful, though at times shows that she does have a good heart. She often sets up impromptu contests between herself and Saga.

Anne
Voiced by: Akiko Nakagawa (Japanese); Mari Devon (English); Rowena Benavidez–Lazaro (Tagalog)

One of Saga's two best friends, Anne is a tall and gentle girl with a caring, humble personality and creative intelligence. Anne is a budding playwright, as seen in the OAV, wherein she authors the play, "The Princess and the Fairy" for her class to produce.

Norma
Voiced by: Sawa Ishige (Japanese); Dina Sherman (English); Rowena Raganit (Tagalog)

Norma is the other of Saga's best friends. She is flighty and somewhat forgetful, comically late when meeting up with Saga and Anne. She ends up being cast as the titular fairy in Anne's play in the OAV.

Cinnamon
Voiced by: Akiko Hiramatsu (Japanese); Kari Wahlgren (English); Bon Reyes (Tagalog)

Cinnamon is a male apprentice and an ice fairy who is best friends with Basil. He appears calm until he uses his cymbals, which make him go crazy. He also loves to cause mischief and play pranks on humans.

Basil
Voiced by: Yumiko Kobayashi (Japanese); Ezra Weisz (English); Louie Paraboles (Tagalog)

Basil is a male apprentice and a thunder fairy who is best friends with Cinnamon. His instrument is the drum. He loves to cause mischief and play pranks.

Regina Bergman
Voiced by: Chikako Akimoto (Japanese); Darcy Fitzwater (English); Rowena Raganit (Tagalog)

Regina is Saga's grandmother who like many others cannot see the season fairies. She is very caring towards Saga and thinks there is something wrong with her because she sees her talking to apparently thin air.

Phil
Voiced by: Asami Sanada (Japanese); Steve Staley (English); Montreal Repuyan (Tagalog)

Phil is Saga's classmate and an aspiring inventor who often tries to enlist Saga, Anne, and Norma's help with his latest project.

Jan and Alan
Jan Voiced by: Yuko Sasamoto (Japanese); Peter Doyle (English); Bon Reyes (Tagalog)
Alan Voiced by: Jun Fukushima (Japanese); Mona Marshall (English); Rowena Raganit (Tagalog)

Jan and Alan are two friends of Phil who help him in his inventing.

Ginger
Voiced by: Kotono Mitsuishi (Japanese); Mari Devon (English) (1-4), Hope Grandflower (ep. 5-24), Grace Cornel (Tagalog)

Ginger is an adult rain fairy who is dedicated to her job. She can be brutally honest at times but means well and keeps an eye on the apprentice fairies. She has romantic but unrequited feelings for Turmeric.

Turmeric
Voiced by: Kenji Nojima (Japanese); Ezra Weisz (English); Louie Paraboles (Tagalog)

Turmeric is an adult cloud fairy who plays the cello. Turmeric is a kind, thoughtful, and subdued fairy who constantly strives to perfect his clouds, and is therefore oblivious to Ginger's romantic attention towards him.

The Elder
Voiced by: Fumihiko Tachiki (Japanese); Steve Kramer (English); Montreal Repuyan (Tagalog)

The Elder is the leader of the season fairies and capable of creating any kind of weather. Though extremely wise, he often appears foolish, particularly in his dedicated pursuit of Ginger.

Vincent
Voiced by: Mitsuo Iwata (Japanese); Tony Oliver (English)

The star actor of the Hammond Theater Group and a talented piano player who idolizes Saga's late mother. Although sometimes careless with his off-hand remarks, he is really a gentle and kind young man. It is revealed that he once had his own encounter with a season fairy; although he no longer sees them in their true form, he (as does Saga after Sugar's departure) can still spot the glitter trail the fairies leave when they fly about.

Ms. Hanna
Voiced by: Akiko Hiramatsu (Japanese); Jessica Gee George (English)

Saga's school teacher, a caring woman who is concerned about Saga's domestic situation.

Paul
Voiced by: Yasunori Matsumoto (Japanese); Tony O'Donnell (English)

A staff worker of the music store Crescendo, where the piano of Saga's late mother is kept. He lets Saga inside whenever the store's stern owner has left, in order to allow her to play (while the store owner actually listens to the music whilst having coffee at Luchino's café).

Luchino
Voiced by: Kiyonobu Suzuki (Japanese); Steve Kramer (English)

The easy-going owner of the café Little Me, where Saga is working after school. He is usually seen contendly munching a cookie.

Henry
Voiced by: Hideyuki Umezu (Japanese); Steve Kramer (English)

A ticket seller at Muhlenburg's central tower, the town's most popular vantage point. He regularly has some coffee delivered by Saga, who in place of a tip enjoys the view from the tower.

Joe
Voiced by: Fumihiko Tachiki (Japanese); Jim Taggert (English)

A thieving crow who often appears as an antagonist to the fairies, particularly whenever they mess with his collection of shiny trinkets which they assume to be "twinkles".

Ingrid Bergman
Voiced by: Yuko Minaguchi (Japanese); Stephanie Sheh (English)

Saga's late mother and a famous pianist. She was killed in a very tragic accident while riding her bike back home after buying a small toy piano for Saga from the toy store; Ingrid's death left a significant impact on her daughter. It can be assumed that she was married, but her husband's whereabouts remain unknown after she died.

== Production ==
The initial concept for A Little Snow Fairy Sugar began with the producers at TBS deciding that they wanted to have a series about a little fairy. Haruka Aoi took this idea and came up with the concept of a fantasy town where Season Faries lived and traveled the world to control the weather. Together Aoi, Yasunori Yamada who was responsible for the series structure, a representative from Kadokawa Shoten, and series director Shinichiro Kimura the final framework for the series was hammered out. Kimura focused on telling a story that focuses on the relationship between Sugar and Saga, while not fully explaining some things to viewers. In particular, he notes that the series never really explains what the "Twinkles" are that they faeries are searching for because he felt viewers should draw their own conclusions and that the show's purpose to show how friendships are formed and how they result in people growing as human beings.

The character of Sugar started as with the basic idea that the main character of the series would be a snow fairy. When trying to think of a name, Yamada associated snow with white, which he said reminded him of "sugar", giving the snow fairy its name. With that name decided, he decided that all of the other fairies would also have the names of condiments. Initially, the story was going to be set in the fairy world, with no humans at all, however, as they worked on fleshing out the story, the character of Saga was introduced. Aoi originally envisioned her as a quiet and calm girl, but she was eventually changed into the more assertive and organization obsessed character seen in the final version. Yamada notes that Kimura was responsible for turning the story into a more positive and cheerful one than the original concept might have resulted in. Yamada felt the character of Greta was a key character, particularly towards the series. He notes that he and other staff members adored her as they felt she was a "good girl and a lovable character". Aoi was initially surprised to find that Sugar ended up being more tomboyish than he had originally planned, but after watching the completed series, he decided that it made her cute. He felt the completed series was a "great mixture of scenario, characters, music, background and voice acting."

The visual designs for the characters began with conceptual designs by Koge-Donbo. As the series was an original work and not based on a manga, she was unsure on what the final appearances for the characters would be like. Character designer Keiko Kawashima notes that this made it confusing for her to follow the designs at first. She initially designed Saga with a more youthful appearance, but in discussing the character with Kimura, it was decided that she should have a more mature appearance that would be clearly distinctive from the appearances of the fairies. In animating the series, full-digital animation is used. Because of the fairies smaller size and movements, they would initially be drawn the same size as humans, then shrunk down when needed for scenes with humans. This allowed the animators to give the characters more detailed and realistic movements.

In designing the setting for the series, art director Shichiro Kobayashi was sent to Germany to search for locations. Though initially reluctant to go, as he felt reference materials would be enough, Kobayashi notes that it ended up being a valuable experience as he was able to better capture the Europeans' aesthetic sense and the "tastefulness" that permeates the towns and houses. Returning to Japan, he attempted to capture the "atmosphere" of the region, using pastel colors and aiming to make the art feel "comfortable."

The series music began with Pioneer requesting that it be romantic feeling, using piano and strings, which pleased music director Shinkichi Mitsumune, who had been working with the medium in his previous project. Wanting to also do something different, Mitsumune initially considered using elements from the rock and dance genres, but after seeing the conceptual art and reading the series scripts, he revisited his vision and decided to go with something more orthodox that better matched the inspiration he felt from the series. For the vocal tracks, sound director Yota Tsuruoka notes that the most difficult issue was dealing with the scenes where the faeries and humans would be having separate, unrelated conversations at the same time. He decided not to just have the tracks recorded separately for combining in the editing stage, but instead had the voice actors actually perform the scenes as written, with each group doing their conversations at the same time just as it occurs on screen.

== Media ==
=== Anime ===
Created by "Project Sugar"—a collaboration between TBS, J.C.Staff, and Kadokawa Shoten—the A Little Snow Fairy Sugar series premiered in Japan on TBS on October 2, 2001. Directed by Shinichiro Kimura and written by Yasunori Yamada, the series ran for 24 episodes until its conclusion on March 26, 2002.

It was licensed and released in North America by Geneon Entertainment. After the company folded in the United States, its DVD releases of the series went out of print. In July 2009, Sentai Filmworks announced that they had relicensed the anime, which was rereleased by Section23 Films in October 2009.

The anime series uses three pieces of theme music. Yoko Ishida's Japanese cover of The Rubettes' 1974 hit single "Sugar Baby Love" by Kotoko is used for the opening theme for all of the episodes except the first and the last, which use no opening. It is also used for the ending theme for the last episode. Maria Yamamoto's performance of the song "Snow Flower" is used for the ending theme for the first 23 episodes.

=== OVA ===
A two-episode original video animation was released for the series. Set four years after the conclusion of the series, Saga remembers a school play in which she played the princess and struggled with stage fright, while Sugar and other fairies decide to make a play of their own.

The ending theme for the OVA is "Kokoro no Piano" ("Heart's Piano") by Masumi Asano.

=== Manga ===
Written and illustrated by Botan Hanayashiki, the A Little Snow Fairy Sugar manga series based on the anime series was originally serialized in Dragon Junior. The individual chapters were published in three tankōbon volumes by Kadokawa Shoten.

The manga series was licensed for an English language release in North America by ADV Manga; the company folded in 2009.

== Reception ==
The anime adaptation was positively received. In a review of the first DVD collection, in 2003, by Mike Crandol, for the same site, he was more positive. He called the series a "well-written show for children that adults can enjoy just as much" and said it is a "heartwarming childhood tale" which is engaging and smart, calling it a rare children's program that "doesn't insult kids' intelligence," but criticized Sugar for being "too sweet" which would delight those who like kawaii culture while hard for others to stomach. He also said that the series' animation is "more accomplished than in any episode of Pokémon or Yu-Gi-Oh!," especially the title sequence, and ended by saying that the series is perfect "for grown-up anime fans to watch with their kids" and added "if you're a fan of the cute stuff, prepare to be blown away.

Carlo Santos of Anime News Network reviewed the DVD collection, released in 2009, describing as a "relic" from the early 2000s without any gimmicks, describing it is a "heartwarming children's series with an infusion of magic" but criticizing it as starting off "incredibly weak" with pacing that is lackluster, while Saga's dealings with the fairies "never quite reach[es] full comedy potential." He further argued that the series found its pushing in the sixth episode when Saga kicks Sugar out of her house, the soul and heart of the series from episodes nine to twelve which "turns out to be the most in-depth exploration of the characters yet," but criticized the show's visuals for not translating well into an animated form, with "cheap animation shortcuts" which didn't impact the music, including good themes song, and ended by saying that the series has "a quality that seems to have gone missing from the industry as of late" by being one of the "last few honest anime shows."

The anime has ranked high on the lists published by the Japanese website Anihabara, reaching number two on the November 2001 list, and number one on both the February and March 2002 lists.
