= Odd Taxi: In the Woods =

2022 Japanese film

- Theatrical release poster, featuring Hiroshi Odokawa

Japanese name
- Kanji: 映画 「オッドタクシー イン・ザ・ウッズ」
- Literal meaning: Film "Odd Taxi: In the Woods"
Transcriptions
- Revised Hepburn: Eiga "Oddo Takushī In za Uzzu"
- Directed by: Baku Kinoshita
- Written by: Kazuya Kinomoto
- Starring: Natsuki Hanae; Riho Iida; Ryohei Kimura; Kappei Yamaguchi
- Music by: OMSB; PUNPEE; VaVa
- Production companies: OLM Team Yoshioka; P.I.C.S.
- Distributed by: Asmik Ace
- Release date: April 1, 2022
- Running time: 128 minutes
- Country: Japan
- Language: Japanese
- Box office: $437,828

Odd Taxi: In the Woods (Japanese: オッドタクシー イン・ザ・ウッズ, Hepburn: Oddo Takushī In za Uzzu) is a 2022 Japanese animated mystery film directed by Baku Kinoshita and written by Kazuya Kinomoto. It is based on 2021 anime television series Odd Taxi produced by OLM and P.I.C.S. It was released in April 2022 by Asmik Ace in Japan, with Crunchyroll acquiring North American distribution rights.

== Plot ==
The plot of the film was described as a "reconstruction" on the events of the 2021 series, according to a press release by Famitsu, with a depiction of the events which take place after the series finale. The plot of the original series focuses on Odokawa, a middle-aged walrus taxi driver, whose interactions with his customers entangle him into a recent disappearance of a girl.

The end of the film includes an expanded scene depicting Odokawa's confrontation with Sakura Wadagaki, who was revealed in the series to have killed and replaced Yuki Mitsuya, the missing girl who was a backup singer in Mystery Kiss. In the credits, it is shown that Odokawa survived his encounter with Sakura and that Sakura was arrested for her crimes.

== Voice cast ==
A preliminary list was listed by Famitsu for the cast for the film. The main cast reprise their roles from the main series.

Character	Japanese
Hiroshi Odokawa	Natsuki Hanae
Miho Shirakawa	Riho Iida
Ayumu Goriki	Ryōhei Kimura
Eiji Kakihana	Kappei Yamaguchi
Rui Nikaido	Suzuko Mimori
Shiho Ichimura	Moeka Koizumi
Yuki Mitsuya	Manatsu Murakami
Kenshiro and Koshiro Daimon	Kohei and Asei (Miki comedy duo)
Shibagaki and Baba (Homosapiens)	Yūsuke and Atsuhiro Tsuda (Diane comedy duo)

== Production ==
The film's production was announced on December 25, 2021, through the official series' Twitter. The date corresponds to the date of the series finale within the series itself. On the initial release, promotional material depicted the series' protagonist Odokawa in an interrogation room, prompting speculation regarding the film's plot. The film's trailer featured a blend of previous footage from the series and brand-new footage. The film was released on April 1, 2022, in Japan, with an unknown international release date. It was additionally revealed that the cast from the 2021 series would be reprising their roles for the film. Director Baku Kinoshita and writer Kazuya Konomoto additionally would head the production of the film.

Crunchyroll subsequently announced that it received distribution rights in North America, while Asmik Ace received Japanese distribution rights. On July 15, 2022, Mighty Media announced that they would distribute the film in Taiwan.

== Reception ==
Odd Taxi: In the Woods earned $437,828 at the Japanese box office.
