= Ippatsu Kanta-kun =

Japanese anime television series

- Cover art from the first box of the DVD release of Ippatsu Kanta-kun
- 一発貫太くん
- Genre: Sports, Comedy, Family
- Created by: Tatsunoko Production Planning Office
- Directed by: Hiroshi Sasagawa
- Music by: Shosuke Ichikawa; Koba Hayashi
- Country of origin: Japan
- Original language: Japanese
- No. of episodes: 53

Production
- Executive producer: Tatsuo Yoshida
- Producer: Akira Inoue
- Production companies: Fuji Television; Tatsunoko Production

Original release
- Network: FNS (Fuji TV)
- Release: September 18, 1977 – September 24, 1979

Ippatsu Kanta-kun is a Japanese anime series created by Tatsunoko Production. The series originally aired on Fuji Television and its affiliates from September 18, 1977, to September 24, 1978, and aired 53 episodes. The series was released in two DVD box sets in January 2010.

Along with Temple the Balloonist, it was one of the last works for which Tatsunoko co-founder Tatsuo Yoshida was credited as a creator; Yoshida died before the series began airing.

== Plot ==
Kanta Tobase (Japanese: 戸馳貫太) lives in the downtown with his mother, seven brothers and sisters, and the house dog. He is very enthusiastic about baseball. However, his mother never allows her children to even talk about baseball, not to speak of playing it since she believes that her husband died accidentally on account of baseball. As for Kanta, however, he continues play baseball secretly from early morning. One day he is asked by his friend to play as a substitute on a team. As Kanta completes a big play, he sees his mother standing there with a grim look. She tells Kanta not to play baseball ever again. But Kanta does not give up. As usual, he goes out to the field early next morning for practice. When his mother who is moved by Kanta's eagerness she decides to help Kanta and even proposes to organize a baseball team of their own.

Never released in English, the anime was a success on television in Italy (as Il fichissimo del baseball) and in Poland (as Baseballista). It is also noteworthy for marking the directorial debut of then-Tatsunoko staffer and future Ghost in the Shell and Urusei Yatsura director Mamoru Oshii, as an episode director.

== Cast ==
- Chikako Akimoto as Ichiro
- Kaneto Shiozawa as Jiro
- Katsuji Mori as Fujita
- Kazue Komiya as Shiro Tobase
