= Akebi's Sailor Uniform =

Japanese manga series

- First tankōbon volume cover, featuring Komichi Akebi

明日ちゃんのセーラー服 (Akebi-chan no Sērāfuku)
- Genre: Slice of life
- Manga
- Written by: Hiro
- Published by: Shueisha
- Imprint: Young Jump Comics
- Magazine: Tonari no Young Jump
- Original run: August 2, 2016 – present
- Volumes: 16
- Anime television series
- Directed by: Miyuki Kuroki
- Written by: Rino Yamasaki
- Music by: Kana Utatane
- Studio: CloverWorks
- Licensed by: Crunchyroll; SEA: Muse Communication
- Original network: Tokyo MX, GTV, GYT, BS11, MBS, BS Asahi
- English network: US: Crunchyroll Channel
- Original run: January 9, 2022 – March 27, 2022
- Episodes: 12
- icon

Akebi's Sailor Uniform (Japanese: 明日ちゃんのセーラー服, Hepburn: Akebi-chan no Sērāfuku) is a Japanese manga series written and illustrated by Hiro. It has been serialized online via Shueisha's Tonari no Young Jump website since August 2016, with its chapters collected in 16 tankōbon volumes as of May 2026. An anime television series adaptation produced by CloverWorks aired from January to March 2022.

== Plot ==
Throughout her young life, Komichi Akebi has always loved sailor attire—being inspired by her idol Miki Fukumoto—even going so far as to allow her mother Yuwa make a sailor school uniform for her when she enters middle school. When Komichi gets accepted to her mother's old private school Rōbai Girls' Academy, she is delighted that she will wear her homemade uniform; once arriving at her new school, she is surprised to find out that Rōbai's dress code no longer uses sailor uniforms and have been replaced with blazers instead. Despite the circumstances, the school's headmistress happily makes an exception and allows her to wear the traditional sailor uniform. As she goes through her years of early adolescence, even experiencing some struggles along the way, she meets and befriends many of her school peers and enjoys her school life.

== Characters ==
=== Rōbai Academy Class 1-3 ===
Komichi Akebi (明日 小路, Akebi Komichi)
Voiced by: Manatsu Murakami (Japanese); Megan Shipman (English)
Komichi is a first year middle school student and the titular protagonist and is a graduate of Futaba Elementary School who has recently been accepted to the elite all-girls' Rōbai Academy, the same school her mother Yuwa attended when she was her age.
Tōko Usagihara (兎原 透子, Usagihara Tōko)
Voiced by: Akari Kitō (Japanese); Kristi Rothrock (English)
Tōko is a mischievous student who is originally from Tokyo. She is Erika's dormmate, and befriends Komichi on her first day. A member of the softball club, Tōko is known among her classmates for cooking and baking various food for her schoolmates, having a kitchen in her dormitory, as well as her poor grades. She went to the same cram school as Ai.
Minoru Ōkuma (大熊 実, Ōkuma Minoru)
Voiced by: Konomi Kohara (Japanese); Brittney Karbowski (English)
An inquisitive girl, Minoru dislikes socializing, preferring instead to take notes of people while observing them to use it in the future. She also takes notes of various wild animals she sees. In the anime, Minoru shares a dorm with Ayumi.
Neko Kamimoku (神黙 根子, Kamimoku Neko)
Voiced by: Miku Itō (Japanese); Dani Chambers (English)
Neko is a girl who tends to sleep a lot. She is Tōko's roommate and belongs to the archery club.
Erika Kizaki (木崎 江利花, Kizaki Erika)
Voiced by: Sora Amamiya (Japanese); Suzie Yeung (English)
Erika is a girl from Tokyo and the first person whom Komichi meets on her first day of school, quickly becoming her best friend. She hails from a rich family as her family back at home owns and lives in a mansion. When feeling nervous or anxious, she has a habit of using her nail clippers, saying that the sound of the clippers is a therapeutic relief for her; she has learned many hobbies, such as playing the violin, piano, and horseback riding, but ultimately joins the climbing club.
Tomono Kojō (古城 智乃, Kojō Tomono)
Voiced by: Shion Wakayama (Japanese); Kate Bristol, Meg McClain (Young) (English)
Tomono is a shy, quiet girl with glasses who is originally from Nagano Prefecture. She is a bookworm and thus a member of the literature club.
Riona Shijō (四条 璃生奈, Shijō Riona)
Voiced by: Azusa Tadokoro (Japanese); Amber Lee Connors (English)
Riona is a self-conscious girl who used to play tennis.
Ai Tatsumori (龍守 逢, Tatsumori Ai)
Voiced by: Mariya Ise (Japanese); Felecia Angelle (English)
Ai is a studious and serious student. She is the class vice president and a member of the track-and-field club.
Kei Tanigawa (谷川 景, Tanigawa Kei)
Voiced by: Akira Sekine (Japanese); Madeleine Morris (English)
The class president, Kei gives off the aura of a tough student, making her somewhat unpopular. She is a member of the photography club, being best student in academics.
Ayumi Tōgeguchi (峠口 鮎美, Tōgeguchi Ayumi)
Voiced by: Shiori Mikami (Japanese); Kelsey Maher (English)
Ayumi is a lone wolf who is Minoru's roommate. She suffers from severe anxiety to the point of taking medication, which Komichi assists her with. Ayumi is a member of the table tennis club.
Mai Togano (戸鹿野 舞衣, Togano Mai)
Voiced by: Haruka Shiraishi (Japanese); Katelyn Barr (English)
Mai is a member of the basketball club.
Yasuko Nawashiro (苗代 靖子, Nawashiro Yasuko)
Voiced by: Kaede Hondo (Japanese); Bryn Apprill (English)
Yasuko is a friendly and popular girl in the school's volleyball club.
Riri Minakami (水上 りり, Minakami Riri)
Voiced by: Yui Ishikawa (Japanese); Dawn M. Bennett (English)
Riri is a member of the swimming club who speaks in Kansai dialect. She is playful and competitive, but does not perform well in academics.
Hotaru Hiraiwa (平岩 蛍, Hiraiwa Hotaru)
Voiced by: Momo Asakura (Japanese); Lizzie Freeman (English)
Hotaru is a sweet and soft-spoken girl in Komichi's class. With the height of an elementary school student, she is one of the shortest students in her class.
Oshizu Hebimori (蛇森 生静, Hebimori Oshizu)
Voiced by: Mitsuho Kambe (Japanese); Michelle Rojas (English)
Oshizu is Mai's roommate who loves punk rock music. Despite this, she initially could not read it, but soon learns to play the guitar.
Hitomi Washio (鷲尾 瞳, Washio Hitomi)
Voiced by: Shizuka Ishigami (Japanese); Morgan Garrett (English)
Hitomi is a tall and stoic girl whose only interest is volleyball. A member of the volleyball club, she later becomes Yasuko's best friend.

=== Others ===
Yuwa Akebi (明日 ユワ, Akebi Yuwa)
Voiced by: Kana Hanazawa (Japanese); Erica Schroeder (English)
Komichi and Kao's mother and Sato's wife. She is an alumna of Rōbai Girls Academy; Yuwa can be seen in an old photograph with two of her friends wearing Rōbai Academy's original sailor school uniform, which inspired Komichi to have Yuwa create her a sailor uniform of her own.
Kao Akebi (明日 花緒, Akebi Kao)
Voiced by: Misaki Kuno (Japanese); Tia Ballard (English)
Kao is Komichi's younger sister who is in third grade elementary school student.
Sato Akebi (明日 サト, Akebi Sato)
Voiced by: Satoshi Mikami (Japanese); David Wald (English)
Sato is Komichi and Kao's father as well as Yuwa's husband. He is usually away on business, but makes time to see his family whenever he does not have to work.
Miki Fukumoto (福元 幹, Fukumoto Miki)
Voiced by: Shuka Saitō (Japanese); Amanda Lee (English)
Miki is an idol whom Komichi admires. Her use of a sailor uniform in a water bottle ad inspired Komichi to wear a sailor uniform.

== Production ==
Akebi's Sailor Uniform is author Hiro's first work published by Shueisha. Around half year before the end of his previous work, Yumekuri, he was reached out to by the editorial department of Weekly Young Jump. He knew that it would be impossible for him to carry out a weekly serialization and therefore had little interest in working with Young Jump. He however still had a meeting with them and surprisingly found out they could provide options other than weekly serialization.

Hiro and Young Jump entered in talks about crafting a school story after he showed them school-themed artwork, which included prototypes of several characters. He intended to set the story in high school, but changed it to middle school, finding it a better setting for making discoveries about life. Komichi Akebi was not planned to be the main character of the series, whose focus would instead go randomly from a character to another in an anthology of stories, but Hiro decided ultimately to make her the protagonist and give her a social personality to share the focus with the rest. Hiro created her character arc by inspiration of his mother, who once told him how Japanese school uniforms like her own used to be home made. He and his editor Hachi Okuma later came up with the plot point of her wearing a different school uniform from the rest of her class.

Hiro writes the story without fixed plans, wanting it to develop naturally. He took inspiration from own experiences in his freshman year in college, which were reflected in Komichi meeting classmates from all over Japan from the first time. Hiro also read many shōjo manga in preparation, but consciously tried to avoid usual tropes and motifs of the genre. In order to draw the detailed artwork of the characters' movements, he studied videos of gymnastics and ballet, counting on his previous experience as an animator. He also studied Japanese idol MVs, including one by singer and voice actress Manatsu Murakami, who would voice the main character in the anime series.

Hiro helped choose the main character's voice actress during the production of the anime, deeming Manatsu Murakami ideal. Murakami, who described herself as strikingly similar to Komichi in personality and interests, although not in background, strongly identified with the character after reading the manga, to the point of crying in joy when she was confirmed for the role. She also became close to Sora Amamiya and Akari Kitō, who played Komichi's two main friends, and to Hiro himself, who coached her briefly on how to play the character. Both Hiro and Murakami described the experience working in the production as similar to Komichi knowing her classmates within the story. Aside from Murakami, several other members of the cast, like Kitō, Amamiya, Shion Wakayama and Shuka Saitō, became fans of the manga.

== Media ==
=== Manga ===
Written and illustrated by Hiro, Akebi's Sailor Uniform started its serialization in Shueisha's Tonari no Young Jump magazine on August 2, 2016. The first volume was released on April 19, 2017. As of May 19, 2026, sixteen volumes have been released.

==== Volumes ====
No.	Japanese release date	Japanese ISBN
1	April 19, 2017	978-4-08-890671-3
Prologue; Chapters 1–6
Komichi Akebi expresses excitement at entering Rōbai Academy, as it allows her to wear a sailor uniform like her favorite idol, Miki Fukumoto. Komichi's mother Yuwa tailors the uniform, but they realize at Rōbai's entrance ceremony that every other student is wearing a blazer-based attire. The headmaster permits the use of the sailor uniform, so Komichi wears it on her first day at Rōbai. Komichi meets and quickly befriends Erika Kizaki, who also has unusual habits and is sitting next to her. Komichi introduces herself to her classmates in Class 1-3 and becomes acquainted with the mischievous Tōko Usagihara and the reserved Tomono Kojō. At the end of classes, Komichi shares her first day to Yuwa, her sister Kao, and her father Sato, remarking her eagerness to experience more days in Rōbai.
2	October 19, 2017	978-4-08-890765-9
Chapters 7–13; Bonus Chapter
Komichi continues befriending her classmates as time passes. She compliments the photography skills of class president Kei Tanigawa when the latter accidentally sent Komichi a sensual picture of herself after admiring Komichi's boldness. Kei is motivated by her words to join the photography club. Tomono helps Komichi find a club to join and later take shelter from the rain. Komichi reads Tomono's book to pass the time, which inspires Komichi to join the drama club. She explores Rōbai's dorms with Tōko as her guide, learning that Tōko has a penchant for baking. Komichi later invites Erika to a fishing trip, and they enjoy their time together. Komichi and Erika happily agree to call each other on a first name basis.
3	May 18, 2018	978-4-08-891016-1
Side A; Side B; Chapters 14–19; Bonus Chapter
Komichi poses for Kei as part of her photography club pamphlet and also becomes enamored at Erika wearing a kimono. She then duels Riri Minakami in a race organized by stern class vice-president Ai Tatsumori to determine the Swim team's anchor for the sports festival. Although Komichi loses, Minakami shares her joy in seeing her tenacity. Back home, Yuwa finishes tailoring Komichi's summer uniform, and Komichi presents it to her family. In the lead-up to the sports festival, Komichi unwittingly helps Riona Shijō overcome her insecurities regarding her appearance and reinvigorate her tennis drive. She also organizes volleyball practice with Kao at her old elementary school's gym, as the rest of Class 1-3 join them. Back at Rōbai's dorms, Erika intently practices out of a desire to join Komichi in her dance for the sports festival's afterparty.
4	November 19, 2018	978-4-08-891115-1
Chapters 20–25; Bonus Chapter
Komichi prepares to perform the dance at the afterparty, when she becomes surprised at Erika accompanying her in instrumentals. Komichi and Erika begin their performance, and their classmates reminisce on Komichi's support of them during the sports festival. The two end their set and are given a standing ovation. With summer break approaching, Komichi, Tōko, and Riona go shopping at the mall and enjoy themselves in the rain. Komichi and Kao later visit the local summer festival, though Kao is disappointed at Komichi spending less time with her. Kao encounters Ai, where they bond on feeling lonely and play at a shooting booth. Ai requests Kao to keep their meeting a secret, but becomes flustered when Komichi finds them.
5	May 17, 2019	978-4-08-891223-3
Chapters 26–33
As summer break begins, Komichi spends her days calling Erika—who returned home to Tokyo—by phone and exercising with Kao. The Akebi family also decides to visit the beach after Sato allots time from work to plan the trip. The family arrives at the beach and enjoys their time swimming and diving. Yuwa remarks the similarities between Sato and Komichi bringing joy to their peers regardless of their worries, and the family is guided by staff to the inn Sato booked to celebrate Komichi passing Rōbai's entrance exams, leaving her stunned. Komichi later thanks Sato towards his efforts in celebrating her milestone, before sharing to Sato on looking forward to more events at Rōbai.
6	November 19, 2019	978-4-08-891384-1
Chapters 34–38; Bonus Chapter
Yuwa and Kao drop off Komichi at the train station and wish her luck on her Tokyo trip. Komichi meets with Ai and they board the train to Tokyo. Ai reveals she will not be joining the trip, admitting her sternness is rooted on being bullied in her past. Komichi continues to see her as being caring and earnest, moving Ai as she decides to join Komichi, Erika, and Tōko. During the trip, Tōko is suddenly reunited with her former schoolmates—who treat her terrible—then confides in the girls that she enrolled at Rōbai to make a fresh start after her schoolmates spread rumors about her personal life, remarking her actions as being lame. Komichi, Erika, and Ai retort that Tōko is cool, and they stay at her home and meet her family. The girls comfort Tōko and Ai on their respective troubles, and they head out to explore Tokyo again the next day.
7	August 19, 2020	978-4-08-891549-4
Chapters 39–43; Bonus Chapter
While visiting a local park, Erika expresses her admiration towards Komichi's personality, only to become frightened when Komichi endangers herself to save Erika's ribbon. Erika impulsively slaps Komichi, causing a rift between them as the girls arrive at Erika's mansion. After seeing Erika cry out of guilt for her actions, Tōko and Ai help to resolve the situation. Meanwhile, a dour Komichi meets Erika's father and learns of his shortcomings in caring for Erika. Erika clarifies to her father that her time in Rōbai has improved thanks to Komichi's presence, adding that she helped her rediscover her love of music. Komichi and Erika apologize to each other, and Erika promises to her father on performing with Komichi at Rōbai's upcoming cultural festival. Tōko and Ai also request Komichi and Erika to refer them by their first names, strengthening their friendships. Komichi thanks them on the Tokyo trip, and she returns home to her family.
8	April 19, 2021	978-4-08-891777-1
Chapters 44–50; Bonus Chapter
Komichi and her friends in Class 1-3 return to Rōbai after the end of summer break. Their adviser tells them to prepare for the Moon Viewing Festival, when they are interrupted by the visit of eccentric drama club president Hoko Chiarashi. Chiarashi tells Class 1-3 of their involvement in Komichi's cultural festival play and Erika becoming one of its supporting actors, catching everyone off-guard. As Chiarashi leaves with Komichi, Tomono recounts to the class how she met Chiarashi while finding a club for Komichi to join, with Tomono complimenting Chiarashi's unorthodox approach to directing plays. Chiarashi became awed at Komichi's natural talent and enlisted her as a member of the drama club, and Tomono concludes by sharing her excitement for Komichi and Chiarashi's play.
9	October 19, 2021	978-4-08-892102-0
Chapters 51–54; Bonus Chapter
Komichi and Erika struggle to act out a love confession for the play, so Chiarashi orders Komichi to research on romantic love. Komichi interviews her friends on the topic at the Moon Viewing Festival, causing rumors to spread. After failing her tests, she is placed into remedial classes with Riri and Oshizu Hebimori, where Yasuko Nawashiro lectures them about love. Komichi is then approached by Yasuko's roommate Hitomi Washio, who implores her to join the volleyball club after seeing her skills at the sports festival, though Komichi is indecisive. Yasuko begs her to accept Hitomi's offer, during which Yasuko reveals her complicated feelings towards Hitomi and her worries of falling behind Hitomi due to her own weakness. Hearing this, Komichi urges Yasuko to continue staying by Hitomi's side and declines the offer. After helping Yasuko, Komichi decides to accompany Erika.
10	June 17, 2022	978-4-08-892275-1
Chapters 55–60; Bonus Chapter
Sometime before the Moon Viewing Festival, Chiarashi tasks Tomono to write a screenplay for the play. Komichi and Erika read the draft and learn to their shock that they will share a kiss, with Tomono revealing she wrote the screenplay to fit them. In the present, Erika reveals her uncertainty to attend high school at Rōbai in the aftermath of their play. Komichi and Erika promise they will fall in love with each other. Meanwhile, Oshizu, who also reluctantly became an actor for the play, practices her guitar in preparation for the Moon Viewing Festival's party. Oshizu recalls how Komichi motivated her to continue playing the guitar despite feeling inferior to Erika's piano skills, with Oshizu's roommate Mai Togano further encouraging her. While Chiarashi helps set up the party, Komichi meets Mai to celebrate her birthday. Mai solemnly reveals to Komichi that her birthday is also the anniversary of the deaths of her biological parents.
11	March 17, 2023	978-4-08-892538-7
Chapters 61–65
Although Mai remarks that she does not dwell on her parents' deaths since being adopted, Komichi grows concerned. She aims to understand Mai's predicament, while Erika helps a tense Oshizu build her confidence in playing to an audience. Komichi asks Mai on her disposition, but Mai bluntly tells Komichi not to feel sorry for her. Mai insists she has adjusted to her circumstances, though she experiences lingering memories of her parents, much to her discomfort. On the day of Mai's birthday, she runs into Komichi at the remembrance ceremony. Mai discloses that her parents died while driving her to the venue of the Moon Viewing Festival, adding she was the only survivor and has forgotten their faces and voices. Komichi rebuffs that Mai's parents would be proud of her, allowing Mai to emotionally apologize on forgetting her parents and living her life without them.
12	October 19, 2023	978-4-08-892826-5
Chapters 66–70
After paying her respects, Mai deduces the play's contents as Oshizu fails her performance at the Moon Viewing Festival's party. Erika asks Oshizu and Komichi to improve their performances before the cultural festival, and Mai comforts Oshizu and gradually takes a liking to her. As autumn classes begin, Chiarashi requests the student council to increase the drama club's stage time for the festival and avoid conflict with Rōbai's high school theater troupe. Komichi and Erika enter school wearing a black sailor uniform and a suit respectively as part of immersing themselves in the play, shocking their classmates. Komichi and Erika agree to help each other in showcasing their true capabilities through their joint performance. Meanwhile, Oshizu shares to Mai her anxieties towards performing an original song for the play. Mai expresses her enthusiasm to learn Oshizu's disposition through her song. Oshizu, who is flustered by Mai's bluntness, tries to invite her as an actor for the play to no avail.
13	April 18, 2024	978-4-08-893222-4
Chapters 71–75
A video is distributed of Komichi intimately confessing to Erika, causing a stir in Rōbai. Riri applauds Komichi's acting on her feelings for Erika, but Komichi asserts to Riri and Tōko that her feelings are genuine and aspires to stay by Erika's side. Meanwhile, Tomono and Chiarashi convince Mai to join the play after seeing her dynamic with Oshizu. Oshizu points out Mai's integral role towards her own growth, flustering both girls. Komichi asks Yuwa on what type of person she is since participating in the play, so Yuwa invites the family to a flower field to gather inspiration for Komichi. Sato records the family's activities and remarks on Komichi's growth. Sato reminisces on the day of Kao's birth, when a young Komichi risked herself during a snowstorm to call Sato that Yuwa was going into labor. Sato narrowly rescued Komichi and Yuwa and shared his gratitude of his family staying alive.
14	October 18, 2024	978-4-08-893431-0
Chapters 76–80
Komichi also reflects on the events surrounding Kao's birth, as her family helps her gain a new perspective of herself. Komichi asks them to watch the play and writes a letter to Erika retelling the day's events. Erika is grateful on being able to use Komichi's thoughts into a composition, and she later invites her to a date. However, the theater troupe learns of the play and prohibits its performance, citing its unpredictable production. While Chiarashi remains resolute in performing the play, Komichi tearfully voices regret on not being able to realize her date with Erika, who postpones it to tackle the conflict. Upon seeing her sorrow, Erika sees Komichi outside Rōbai's dorms with Ai's help, where Komichi urges Erika to conduct their date soon.
15	May 19, 2025	978-4-08-893641-3
Chapters 81–84; Bonus Chapter
In a flashback, Tomono voices her frustration of the theater troupe prohibiting the play to Class 1-3. The class and Chiarashi decide on expanding the play throughout the entire school, and they motivate Komichi to follow her aspirations through. In the present, Erika confides in Ai of her intention to cut classes with Komichi for their date. Ai hesitantly agrees to cover for their absence, and Erika thanks her for allowing her to see Komichi the previous night. Erika and Komichi then sneak out of Rōbai, during which Erika recalls Komichi declaring they will kiss at the end of their date. As Class 1-3 learns of their date, Oshizu later discloses to Mai on her inferiority to Komichi and Erika and self-loathing while composing her song. She presents its lyrics to Mai, who enthusiastically requests Oshizu to sing them.
16	May 19, 2026	978-4-08-893893-6
Chapters 85–88
Oshizu sings an excerpt, leaving Mai in awe. Oshizu presents her song to Chiarashi, who has her perform it to the student council and theater troupe. Oshizu collapses in fear and cries, believing she is unqualified to perform. Realizing that her presence allows Oshizu to overcome her insecurities, Mai rushes to her onstage and asks her to sing. Moved by Mai's gesture, Oshizu sings of her desire to change despite feeling overwhelmed by prodigies. Meanwhile, Komichi and Erika begin their date at a cafe. The two then head to an amusement park, and Erika tempers Komichi's ambitions of holding an impromptu performance for the play. Komichi laments on their date not going to plan, but Erika reiterates their selfish desire to kiss. Komichi and Erika ride the park's Ferris wheel where Erika adds how much she and their friends have changed thanks to Komichi. They also become moved by Oshizu's song, prompting Komichi to declare that she will become a special person in Erika's life. Komichi and Erika share their first kiss, leaving both girls flustered yet joyful on confirming their love for each other.

=== Anime ===
An anime television series adaptation by CloverWorks was announced on March 26, 2021. Miyuki Kuroki directed the series, while Rino Yamasaki wrote and oversaw the series' scripts. The character designs were provided by Megumi Kōno. Kana Utatane composed the series's music. It aired from January 9 to March 27, 2022, on Tokyo MX and other networks. (Note: Tokyo MX lists the series premiere at 24:30 on January 8, 2022, which is effectively 12:30 AM JST on January 9.) The 16 main cast members, under the name Rōbai Gakuen Chūtōbu 1-nen 3-kumi (蠟梅学園中等部1年3組), performed the opening theme song "Hajimari no Setsuna" (はじまりのセツナ; The First Moment), while Manatsu Murakami (credited as Komichi Akebi) performed the ending theme song "Baton". "Kaze ni Makasete" (風にまかせて; Leave it to the Wind) by Manatsu Murakami (credited as Komichi Akebi) was used as the ending theme song for episode 4. A cover of the Spitz song "Cherry" (チェリー, Cherī) sung by Mitsuho Kambe—the voice of Oshizu Hebimori—is featured in episode 7. Funimation streamed the series outside of Asia. Muse Communication licensed the series in Southeast Asia.

On January 27, 2022, Funimation announced the series would receive an English dub, which premiered on January 29.

==== Episodes ====
No.	Title	Directed by	Storyboarded by	Original release date
1	"The Sailor Uniform I Always Wanted"; Transliteration: "Akogare no Sērāfuku" (Japanese: あこがれのセーラー服)	Miyuki Kuroki; Haruka Tsuzuki	Miyuki Kuroki	January 9, 2022
Komichi Akebi, an energetic and friendly girl who has recently finished elementary school, wants to make many friends at Rōbai Academy. As Komichi will attend an all-girls school, she aims to accomplish her dream of wearing a sailor-style school uniform, following in the footsteps of her favorite idol, Miki Fukumoto. The night before, Komichi's mother Yuwa finishes making the uniform, leaving Komichi overjoyed. However, at Rōbai's entrance ceremony, Yuwa and Komichi realize that every other student is wearing a blazer-based attire. Although the academy headmaster permits the use of the sailor uniform, Komichi contemplates switching over to the blazer attire, but her younger sister Kao convinces her to not be ashamed of being herself. Komichi arrives at Rōbai wearing the sailor uniform and meets her classmate, Erika Kizaki. Seeing that she also has unusual habits—such as clipping her nails to relieve stress—and is sitting next to her, Komichi befriends Erika immediately and begins welcoming the students of Class 1-3.
2	"See You Tomorrow"; Transliteration: "Mata Ashita" (Japanese: また明日)	Makoto Katō	Makoto Katō	January 16, 2022
Without prior experience to introduce herself before, Komichi overdoes her introduction to the class. She also takes notes of everyone to use it as a future way of befriending them. During lunch with Erika, she meets two other classmates: Tomono Kojō, a shy girl with glasses, and Tōko Usagihara, a mischievous girl who quickly strikes up conversation with her, much to Erika's chagrin. Komichi learns that many students who live out of town stay at the dorms, with Tōko and Erika being neighbors. At Tōko's persistence, Komichi simulates one of Miki's movements involving putting lip balm in a unique way, enthralling the three girls. After school, Komichi returns home to find her father Sato having arrived from out-of-town work. Sato initially hesitates on talking to Komichi after a long absence, though he and Komichi eventually discuss about her first day at school, with Komichi expressing excitement for the next day.
3	"Have You Decided on a Club?"; Transliteration: "Bukatsu wa Mō Kimeta?" (Japanese: 部活はもう決めた？)	Takahiro Harada	Shōko Nakamura	January 23, 2022
Komichi receives invitations to multiple clubs upon demonstrating her talents, but cannot decide. She exclaims to the class president, Kei Tanigawa, that she likes her legs, and asks her to take pictures of them. An embarrassed Kei refuses and advises Komichi to decide for a club soon. After the end of classes, Kei admires Komichi's straightforward behavior in private. Inspired by her boldness, Kei takes sensual pictures of herself, only to mistakenly send Komichi a photo when her mother startles her. Komichi commends her photography skills and swears to keep it a secret. The next day, she and Tomono explore the school to find a club to join. They take shelter from the rain, where Komichi finds a book in Tomono's blazer. Tomono tells her it was for her literature club and asks her to read it for her, then falls asleep, but soon wakes up to express her gratitude. Kei and Komichi reveal to the class the following day that they respectively joined the photography and drama clubs.
4	"My Image?"; Transliteration: "Watashi no Imēji?" (Japanese: 私のイメージ？)	Haruka Tsuzuki	Miyuki Kuroki	January 30, 2022
Komichi accompanies Kei around school to take photos of their friends during club activities as part of Kei's photography club pamphlet. Kei also asks Komichi to be a model and capture her in her "natural state". Kei instructs Komichi on posing, though Kei feels that the photos do not showcase Komichi's character. As they walk back, a stray baseball almost hits them and stains Komichi's uniform. Tōko apologizes and offers them to wash their clothes in Rōbai's dorms. Tōko invites them to her dorm room, where she gives Komichi a dress to wear and bakes pastries for the duo. Komichi then tries her hand at baking but fails, allowing Kei to take candid photos of Komichi that accurately depict her character. Komichi later flips through the pages of Kei's completed pamphlet alongside Kao, which contains her photos and those of their friends.
5	"I Want to Learn Lots"; Transliteration: "Ippai Shiritai Natte" (Japanese: いっぱい知りたいなって)	Yoshihisa Matsumoto	Yuki Yase	February 6, 2022
Minoru Ōkuma, another classmate of Komichi, recalls finding her with Kao before the start of school. Minoru began admiring her from far away and later discovered how Komichi is equally adept to animals. After they set free a Japanese rat snake that was in Rōbai back into nature, Minoru shares her handbook to Komichi, detailing the animals she observes as a nature enthusiast. Komichi tells her that she also takes notes of her classmates in her notebook, and they agree to study their friends, ending in multiple awkward situations. Meanwhile, Ayumi Tōgeguchi, Minoru's roommate, grows frustrated at being unable to talk to Komichi and return her handkerchief. Minoru and Komichi find her, where Komichi remembers giving the handkerchief to an anxious Ayumi during Rōbai's entrance exams. Komichi shares her joy of learning about Ayumi's identity, leaving Ayumi flattered as she leaves. Komichi thanks Minoru for the experience, and they agree to observe insects some other day.
6	"There's No School Tomorrow, Right?"; Transliteration: "Ashita, Oyasumi ja Nai Desu ka" (Japanese: 明日、お休みじゃないですか)	Takayuki Kikuchi	Takayuki Kikuchi	February 13, 2022
A confident Komichi expresses to Kao of her desire to invite a friend to their home over the weekend. However, throughout the school week, Komichi cannot bring herself to invite Erika and stalks her. Erika finally asks Komichi on her stalking, so Komichi instead invites her to a fishing trip at a lake. Komichi arrives at the lake, and "saves" Erika from drowning, proving to be a talented swimmer. After clearing up the misunderstanding, Komichi and Erika begin fishing and capture a fish. They take pictures and videos of themselves before releasing the fish. Komichi brings Erika to her home to get changed, and Yuwa and Kao greet her warmly. As they take a bath, Komichi expresses her jealousy to Erika of her family casually referring to her by her given name. Kao and Yuwa then share Komichi's quirks to Erika, much to Komichi's embarrassment. Yuwa drives all of them to Rōbai's dorms, where Erika and Komichi happily agree to call each other on a first name basis. Arriving back home, a joyful Komichi looks back on her trip with Erika.
7	"Please Let Me Hear It"; Transliteration: "Kikasete Kudasai" (Japanese: 聴かせてください)	Moaang	Moaang	February 20, 2022 (Note: This episode aired at 12:32 a.m. JST, 2 minutes after the original air time.)
Komichi encounters Oshizu Hebimori, another classmate of hers, reading from a music magazine. When Komichi asks if she knows how to play instruments, Oshizu lies on being able to play the guitar, prompting Komichi to ask her to play for her sometime. Oshizu teaches herself how to play using her father's guitar, despite confiding to her roommate Mai Togano of her difficulty with the instrument alongside keeping up with school. Mai encourages Oshizu to start small, with the former comparing it to her own experience of learning to play basketball. Oshizu continues to practice and musters the confidence to ask Komichi to follow her to the music room. However, before she can play, they listen to Erika's proficiency with the piano. Feeling inadequate, Oshizu admits to Komichi of her inability to play the guitar, but Komichi urges her to perform regardless of her anxieties. Oshizu plays and sings the song she practiced perfectly, and Komichi applauds her. Oshizu becomes inspired to continue practicing, explaining to Mai that she plans on giving Komichi a better performance next time.
8	"I Want to Win Next Time"; Transliteration: "Tsugi wa Kachitai" (Japanese: 次は勝ちたい)	Yōsuke Yamamoto	Tatsuyuki Nagai	February 27, 2022
Kei and vice-president Ai Tatsumori announce that they will choose the members for the different sports teams for the upcoming sports festival. They select Komichi for the Cheer and Swim teams, with Riri Minakami being elected as the Swim team's anchor. Erika reasons for Komichi's selection in the role, so Ai organizes a race to determine the anchor. Riri requests Komichi they trade uniforms if she wins, causing Komichi to take the wager seriously. At the race, Komichi keeps up with Riri, but the former narrowly loses. Riri congratulates her, telling her the wager was a bluff, and she wanted to see her drive. Riri also reveals that Ai is helping her with her grades to allow her to compete as part of the wager, with a flustered Ai presenting their classmates a special study guide. Back home, Yuwa finishes tailoring Komichi's summer uniform, and Komichi presents it to her family, with Sato complimenting it. Kao later tries on Komichi's uniforms and voices her dismay for not looking cool in them like Komichi does. Komichi assures Kao that they will eventually fit her and ties the uniform's scarf on Kao, leaving her delighted.
9	"Ready... Up!"; Transliteration: "Se～no!" (Japanese: せ～のっ！)	Nozomu Kamiya	Kōji Masunari	March 6, 2022
Komichi meets up with Erika, Tomono, and Tōko at the mall to buy materials for the sports festival. The girls venture the mall's shops and visit a book store, where Erika and Tomono find a book that Tomono coincidentally read on her way to the mall. Tomono offers to lend the book to Erika, while also telling the girls of her beloved handmade bookmark given to her by her mother. Tomono prepares to give the book, only to find her bookmark is missing. After being unable to find it, Tomono tells the girls to abandon the search, just as Komichi spots the bookmark tied to a balloon outside the mall's entrance. However, when Tomono unties the knot, a strong gust of wind blows the balloon into a nearby tree branch. Komichi, Erika, and Tōko successfully help Tomono retrieve it and rejoice, as they witness crepuscular rays breaking through the clouds after a brief rain.
10	"Fight On! Fight On!"; Transliteration: "Faito! Faito!" (Japanese: ファイト！ファイト！)	Haruka Tsuzuki	Eri Irei	March 13, 2022
Summer classes are heralded with preparations for the sports festival. Komichi, Kei, Neko Kamimoku, and Yasuko Nawashiro cheer their classmates as part of their Cheer Team duties. The team goes to cheer Minoru and Ayumi during table tennis, though Ayumi is unsatisfied with their lack of coordination. She gives them lessons on choreography, allowing the team to cheer their classmates properly. Meanwhile, Erika practices tennis with Riona Shijō, a girl who was formerly skilled in tennis and is self-conscious about her weight and early puberty. Seeing Riona look at Komichi's slender figure with envy, Erika suggests she substitute on the Cheer team to overcome her insecurities, despite Riona's reluctance. After reviewing her poor performance, Riona becomes determined to practice again with Komichi and significantly improves, reinvigorating her tennis drive. Later, Komichi attends drama club and shares her experiences with its president, as the president gives her a sheet of paper that shocks her.
11	"Sharing This Time... With Everyone..."; Transliteration: "Onaji Jikan... Minna to..." (Japanese: 同じ時間...みんなと...)	Shin'ichirō Ushijima	Takahiro Miura	March 20, 2022
Komichi learns that she is scheduled to perform an interpretive dance number at the sports festival's afterparty, so she chooses to perform one of Miki's songs. Erika then fantasizes about playing the piano to Komichi's dance, especially after Tōko suggests it. During volleyball practice, Tōko and Komichi struggle to keep up with Riri, Yasuko, Riona, and Hitomi Washio. With Rōbai's facilities unable to accommodate them, Komichi secures her old elementary school's gym as their training camp. The volleyball team, as well as Kao—whom Komichi agreed to take along after noticing her loneliness—visit the gym to begin practice. Elated at having friends in the school she finished by herself before its closing, Komichi practices harder than usual. Komichi becomes overwhelmed with emotion after Tōko reveals she invited the entire class to join them. Tōko adds that Erika was unable to join, as Erika intently practices Miki's song to join Komichi in her dance. Komichi grows determined to win the sports festival and perform the dance.
12	"I'm Not Alone"; Transliteration: "Hitori ja Nain da" (Japanese: ひとりじゃないんだ)	Miyuki Kuroki; Haruka Tsuzuki	Miyuki Kuroki; Haruka Tsuzuki	March 27, 2022
After the sports festival, Komichi prepares to perform the dance to the student body. Komichi sees Erika accompanying her in instrumentals, revealing that Tōko helped in realizing it. Komichi and Erika perform Miki's song, and their classmates reminisce on Komichi's support and encouragement of them through cheerleading in the various sports festival games. Spurred on by the support of her friends, Komichi gracefully executes acrobatic moves within her choreography. Erika also reflects on her admiration for Komichi, remarking she helped her rediscover her love of music. Komichi and Erika conclude the song and are given a standing ovation. Komichi wakes up the next day and glances at her uniform, wondering if the events of the sports festival were a delightful dream. Komichi arrives at Rōbai and Erika happily greets her, as their friends begin arriving for class. In a post-credits scene, a picture of Komichi and her friends in Class 1-3 is shown after being awarded first place in the sports festival.

== Reception ==
Mercedez Clewis from Anime News Network called the series, which she described as "a coming-of-age story about a teenager just being passionate", her favorite show of the season. Clewis revealed she wept of joy with the series' final episode, which she gave five stars out of five. Allen Moody from THEM Anime Reviews gave the series 4/5 stars, praising its energetic, pleasant story, which he considered an "affirming show", although he felt a lack of comic relief. Regarding popular accusations that the show contained foot fetishism, he found the series' visual fixation on feet mild and non-sexual. Gracie Qu from Anitrendz gave the series an 82/100, calling it a "gorgeously rendered anime that depicts girls' friendships in a way that I haven't yet experienced in an anime". She praised its high-quality animation, visual storytelling, character development and interactions, finding them particularly authentic, as well as its exploration of "light and dark of puberty". Qu also noted the series' usage of feet as a narrative resource rather than fetish. By March 2023, the manga has over one million copies in circulation.

== See also ==
- Super Cub, a light novel series also illustrated by Hiro
