= Odd Taxi =

Japanese anime television series

- First tankōbon volume cover of the manga, featuring Hiroshi Odokawa

オッドタクシー (Oddo Takushī)
- Genre: Mystery
- Manga
- Written by: Kazuya Konomoto
- Illustrated by: Takeichi Abaraya
- Published by: Shogakukan
- English publisher: NA: Denpa
- Imprint: Big Comics
- Magazine: Superior Dalpana
- Original run: January 15, 2021 – July 22, 2022
- Volumes: 5
- Anime television series
- Directed by: Baku Kinoshita
- Written by: Kazuya Konomoto
- Music by: OMSB; Punpee; Vava
- Studio: OLM Team Yoshioka; P.I.C.S.
- Licensed by: Crunchyroll
- Original network: TV Tokyo, AT-X
- Original run: April 6, 2021 – June 29, 2021
- Episodes: 13
- Novel
- Written by: Manabu Wakui; Kazuya Konomoto
- Published by: Shogakukan
- Imprint: Shogakukan Bunko
- Published: July 6, 2021
- Anime film
- Odd Taxi: In the Woods (2022)
- Spin-off
- RoOT/Route of Odd Taxi (2023–2025)
- icon

Odd Taxi (Japanese: オッドタクシー, Hepburn: Oddo Takushī ) (stylized as ODDTAXI) is a Japanese anime television series produced by OLM and P.I.C.S. It was broadcast on TV Tokyo and AT-X from April to June 2021. Set in a world of anthropomorphic animals, it tells the story of walrus taxi driver Hiroshi Odokawa, who converses with his passengers and learns about various mysteries and oddities occurring in Tokyo. These conversations get him involved in the strange disappearance of a schoolgirl, and that leads to him being followed by both the police and the yakuza.

Prior to its release, a manga series from Shogakukan (via Big Comics) began publication in January 2021, and was serialized in its Superior Dalpana magazine until July 2022. An anime film, titled Odd Taxi: In the Woods, was released in Japan in April 2022.

== Plot ==
Set in a world of anthropomorphic animals, Odd Taxi tells the story of Hiroshi Odokawa, a 41-year-old walrus taxi driver whose parents abandoned him in elementary school, leaving him generally asocial. However, he usually has conversations with other animal inhabitants who ride in his taxi on their respective journeys around Tokyo, where the series is set. Odokawa's conversations with these people unravel into a series of mysteries and acts of violence, including that of a missing high school girl. Because of the case of the missing girl, the police have been tracking leads back to him, and now he is being followed by both the police and the yakuza.

== Characters ==
Characters of Odd Taxi. From top to bottom, left to right: Shirakawa, Homosapiens, Goriki, Kakihana, Odokawa, Dobu, the Daimon brothers, Yano, Mystery Kiss

Hiroshi Odokawa (小戸川 宏, Odokawa Hiroshi)
Voiced by: Natsuki Hanae (Japanese); Mike McFarland, Brian Anderson (young) (English)
A middle-aged walrus taxi driver who often maintains a melancholic attitude. Loves to lose himself in various radio programs on and off the job.
Miho Shirakawa (白川 美保, Shirakawa Miho)
Voiced by: Riho Iida (Japanese); Lauren Landa (English)
A young alpaca nurse at Goriki's clinic who seems cheerful but sells some of the clinic's drugs on the black market to pay off her debt. She studies capoeira as a hobby.
Ayumu Goriki (剛力 歩, Gōriki Ayumu)
Voiced by: Ryōhei Kimura (Japanese); Daman Mills (English)
A middle-aged gorilla doctor and Odokawa's primary physician who runs his own clinic.
Eiji Kakihana (柿花 英二, Kakihana Eiji)
Voiced by: Kappei Yamaguchi (Japanese); Lucien Dodge (English)
Odokawa's drinking buddy, a middle-aged white gibbon who works as a janitor and tries to pick up women through a dating app.
Rui Nikaidо (二階堂 ルイ, Nikaidō Rui)
Voiced by: Suzuko Mimori (Japanese); AmaLee (English)
A toy poodle and the lead singer of "Mystery Kiss," a new idol group looking to make it big.
Shiho Ichimura (市村 しほ, Ichimura Shiho)
Voiced by: Moeka Koizumi (Japanese); Jenny Yokobori (English)
A calico cat and one of Mystery Kiss backup singers, forced by her manager to engage in multiple "badger games" to scam money out of rich men.
Yuki Mitsuya (三矢 ユキ, Mitsuya Yuki)
Voiced by: Manatsu Murakami (Japanese); Kayli Mills (English)
A black cat, one of Mystery Kiss backup singers, she was athletic and talented, and was about to replace Rui as lead singer before her mysterious death. It is later revealed that her real name is Sakura Wadagaki that served as a substitute for the real Yuki Mitsuya before Mystery Kiss's debut.
Kenshiro Daimon (大門 堅志朗, Daimon Kenshirō) and Koshiro Daimon (大門 幸志朗, Daimon Kōshirō)
Voiced by: Kōsei (Kenshiro), Asei (Koshiro) (Japanese); Brandon McInnis (Kenshiro), Bryce Papenbrook (Koshiro) (English)
A pair of meerkat identical twins who usually work together as cops. Kenshiro, the older brother, is a cynical, crooked cop who looks the other way in exchange for bribes. Koshiro, the younger brother, has a strong sense of justice and naively trusts his older brother.
Kensuke Shibagaki (柴垣 謙介, Shibagaki Kensuke)
Voiced by: Yūsuke (Japanese); SungWon Cho (English)
A wild boar who plays the boke (funny man) of the manzai comedy duo Homosapiens. He works part-time at a cabaret club to make ends meet while trying to make his comedy career take off.
Atsuya Baba (馬場 敦也, Baba Atsuya)
Voiced by: Atsuhiro Tsuda (Japanese); Brent Mukai (English)
A horse who plays the tsukkomi (straight man) of the manzai comedy duo Homosapiens. Baba finds himself shooting up in popularity and TV appearances but still thinks Shibagaki is the funnier member of their duo.
Taichi Kabasawa (樺沢 太一, Kabasawa Taichi)
Voiced by: Takashi (Japanese); Zeno Robinson (English)
A pygmy hippopotamus college student addicted to social media, desperately in search of a picture or video that will make him "go viral" online.
Taeko Harada (原田 タエ子, Harada Taeko)
Voiced by: Tomoko Murakami (Japanese); Caitlin Glass (English)
A female kangaroo izakaya owner who runs Yamabiko, the izakaya that Odokawa and many of his acquaintances frequent.
Daichi Fukumoto (福本 大地, Fukumoto Daichi)
Voiced by: Keisuke Takai (Japanese); Austin Lee Matthews (English)
A giant panda comedian and member of the comedy duo Bonnou Illumination with Kondo.
Shigeyuki Kondo (近藤 繁之, Kondou Shigeyuki)
Voiced by: Phoenix (Japanese); Chris Lewis (English)
A cheetah comedian and member of the comedy duo Bonnou Illumination with Fukumoto.
Dobu (ドブ)
Voiced by: Kenji Hamada (Japanese); Patrick Seitz (English)
A gelada gangster and bagman under Kuroda, he suspects Odokawa is somehow involved with the missing girl case. He is a rival of Yano. His real name is Kyouhei Mizoguchi (溝口 恭平, Mizoguchi Kyōhei); Dobu (どぶ) is an alternative reading of 溝, the first kanji of his name, which means "ditch".
Shun Imai (今井 旬, Imai Shun)
Voiced by: Kōdai Sakai (Japanese); Sean Chiplock (English)
A striped skunk who is one of Mystery Kiss's first ever fans. He has been obsessively following the group and tries to attend every concert and buy their merchandise when he can. He works part-time at a cabaret club and buys lottery tickets to fund his hobby.
Hajime Tanaka (田中 一, Tanaka Hajime)
Voiced by: Soma Saito (Japanese); Aleks Le (English)
A puma who is part of a video game development team. He became obsessed with obtaining an in-game rarity, a dodo, in a mobile game to make up his past foolish mistake as a child. Becomes unhinged and declares vengeance on Odokawa after he breaks his phone and loses the dodo due to his taxi swerving in front of him.
Fuyuki Yamamoto (山本 冬樹, Yamamoto Fuyuki)
Voiced by: Makoto Furukawa (Japanese); Xander Mobus (English)
The red fox manager of Mystery Kiss who also has an interest in the missing girl case.
Togo Sekiguchi (関口 東吾, Sekiguchi Tōgo)
Voiced by: Chado Horii (Japanese); Chris Tergliafera (English)
A tracksuit-wearing polar bear member of the yakuza, who acts as Yano's bodyguard.
Shigeru Kuroda (黒田 茂, Kuroda Shigeru)
Voiced by: Takaya Kuroda (Japanese); Bob Carter (English)
A Malayan tapir yakuza boss who oversees Dobu and Yano.
Kanon (花音)
Voiced by: Amane Shiomiya (Japanese); Kayli Mills (English)
A tabby cat freelancer and aspiring idol.
Rena (玲奈)
Voiced by: Chika Kagura (Japanese); Maureen Price (English)
A rabbit freelancer and follower of Kabasawa.
Haruhito Yano (矢野 治人, Yano Haruhito)
Voiced by: METEOR (Japanese); Darius Johnson (English)
A porcupine gangster who is Dobu's rival in the same yakuza syndicate. He always speaks in rhymes as if rapping instead of talking.
Satoshi Nagashima (長嶋 聡, Nagashima Satoshi)
Voiced by: Mahiro Takasugi (Japanese); A.J. Beckles (English)
A giraffe high schoolboy who is an obsessive fan of Homosapiens, writing them letters almost every week. Satoshi also runs his own amateur podcast.

== Media ==
=== Anime ===
The anime television series aired on TV Tokyo and AT-X in Japan from April 6 to June 29, 2021. It is directed and storyboarded by Baku Kinoshita and written by Kazuya Konomoto while Konomoto and Hiromi Nakayama designed the characters. The music for the series is composed by OMSB, PUNPEE and VaVa. The series' first 4 episodes had an advanced screening on March 20, 2021, featuring the cast of the series, while a special digest version of those episodes was also streamed online. Singer-songwriter Skirt and rapper DJ PUNPEE performed the series' main theme "Odd Taxi", while Suzuko Mimori performed the series' ending theme song "Sugarless Kiss". Crunchyroll streamed the series in North American territories.

The production committee originally had no plans to release a Blu-Ray Box set, but due to audience demand, it was announced that a Blu-Ray boxset will be released if at least 300 pre-orders would be made during a pre-order campaign. Pony Canyon reported that at least 500 pre-orders were made at a cost of 27,500 Yen ($USD246).

On October 28, 2021, Crunchyroll announced that the series would receive an English dub, which was originally set for release on January 16, 2022. However, it was rescheduled for a release on February 14 instead.

==== Episodes ====
| No. | Title (Note: All English titles are taken from Crunchyroll.) | Director (Note: Information is taken from the ending credits of each episode.) | Animation director | Chief animation director | Original release date |
|---|---|---|---|---|---|
| 1 | "The Eccentric Driver"; Transliteration: "Kawari Mono no Untenshu" (Japanese: 変わり者の運転手) | Sayaka Yamai | Miyō Ōno, Yukie Kinoshita, Aoi Yamato | Shinobu Ōkawa | April 6, 2021 |
At night, walrus taxi driver Hiroshi Odokawa picks up dwarf hippopotamus college student Taichi Kabasawa, who posts a selfie with Odokawa in hopes of going viral on social media. Momentarily being pulled over by identical twin meerkat cops Kenshiro and Koshiro Daimon, Odokawa tells them that he has not seen a gelada baboon gangster named Dobu. At Nerima, Odokawa drops off Kabasawa, who accidentally leaves his cellphone in the taxi. The viral selfie post caught an image of Dobu in the background. At home, Odokawa talks to someone living in his closet, but they do not respond. The next morning, Odokawa visits the clinic to see gorilla doctor Ayumu Goriki and alpaca nurse Miho Shirakawa. As Odokawa approaches his taxi, Kenshiro confiscates an SD card from the dashcam, suspecting Odokawa of kidnapping a high schoolgirl. In an izakaya, white gibbon janitor Eiji Kakihana lies about his annual income on a dating app. Goriki, Kakihana and kangaroo izakaya owner Taeko Harada have a discussion about Dobu. Soon after, Goriki is alerted that some medications were stolen from the clinic. Shirakawa hitches a ride in Odokawa's taxi, while Kenshiro gives the SD card to Dobu in exchange for a bribe.
| 2 | "How To Spend a Long Night"; Transliteration: "Nagai Yoru no Sugoshikata" (Japanese: 長い夜の過ごし方) | Ken'ichi Nishida | Yukie Kinoshita, Aoi Yamato | Hiromi Nakayama | April 13, 2021 |
At a sauna, Kakihana learns that Odokawa and Shirakawa traded phone numbers at the end of the ride. Kakihana receives a match on the dating app with calico cat Shiho Ichimura. At a debut concert venue, toy poodle Rui Nikaidо, the lead singer of the new idol group called Mystery Kiss, confides in her skunk superfan Shun Imai that Mystery Kiss has trouble gaining popularity. Imai is surprised that Ichimura and black cat Yuki Mitsuya, who are the backup singers of Mystery Kiss, were contractually obligated to wear masks for the debut concert. Red fox manager Fuyuki Yamamoto then tells Ichimura and Mitsuya to sell leftover merchandise outside the venue. Despite spending money on lottery tickets in hopes of buying Mystery Kiss CD albums, Imai hitches a ride with Odokawa, who is eventually haggled into giving Imai a ride to Shinjuku. Imai asks for Odokawa's lucky numbers before leaving. Odokawa then picks up wild boar Kensuke Shibagaki and horse Atsuya Baba, the manzai comedy duo called Homosapiens. Baba receives a call to appear on a daytime food show without Shibagaki. After dropping off Shibagaki and Baba at the NHK, Odokawa is soon held at gunpoint when Dobu enters the taxi.
| 3 | "Beware of Borrowed Plumes"; Transliteration: "Tsukeyakiba ni Go-yōjin" (Japanese: 付け焼き刃に御用心) | Mayu Numayama | Hitomi Kōno, Takayuki Shimura | Shinobu Ōkawa | April 20, 2021 |
Back at the sauna, Kakihana overhears tapir yakuza boss Shigeru Kuroda talking on the phone with Dobu about the missing girl case. Odokawa secretly sends a distress signal in his taxi. After Dobu admits to having the dashcam SD card, Odokawa learns that porcupine gangster Haruhito Yano has spread false rumors about Dobu. Kenshiro and Koshiro pull over the taxi, but only Kenshiro gets out of the cop car and dismisses both Odokawa and Dobu. Agreeing to cooperate when Dobu threatens to harm Shirakawa, Odokawa drops off Dobu at Shinjuku, where Dobu buries his revolver. Running late for his date with Shirakawa at the park, Odokawa swerves his taxi in front of puma video game developer Hajime Tanaka in the streets. At the park, Odokawa and Shirakawa watch the sunrise together and talk about capoeira. After dropping off Shirakawa at the clinic, Odokawa meets with Kakihana at the izakaya, soon learning that Kakihana inputted false information in his profile on the dating app. Shirakawa contacts Odokawa, saying that Goriki has gone missing. Kakihana meets with Ichimura at a bus stop in Arakawa, unaware that he is being tailed by Yamamoto and polar bear gangster Togo Sekiguchi.
| 4 | "Tanaka's Revolution"; Transliteration: "Tanaka Kakumei" (Japanese: 田中革命) | Hideaki Ōba | Kazuyuki Toshida, Aki Yamagata | Hiromi Nakayama | April 27, 2021 |
Tanaka recalls when he collected novelty erasers to fit in with his classmates during third grade sixteen years ago. He received a male gray cockatiel as a gift from his father. Later on, he used his father's credit card to purchase a rare eraser resembling mandrill rakugo performer Donraku Shofutei, eventually bidding ¥100,000 in an online auction. However, the eraser never arrived at his home, and his classmates moved on to playing soccer. When he started working at a video game company four years ago, Tanaka got addicted to the mobile game Zooden. He eventually spent ¥5,000,000 to collect super rare species. Upon finally acquiring the ultra rare dodo, Tanaka's celebration is short-lived when Odokawa swerved his taxi in front of Tanaka, who consequently drops his cellphone into a ditch. After getting his cellphone repaired and his data backup restored, Tanaka discovers that Zooden did not register the dodo before his data crashed. Wandering home, Tanaka falls into despair, heading to the park in order to bury his now-dead cockatiel. He finds Dobu's revolver buried in the dirt. After passing by Shibagaki in the streets the next day, a vengeful Tanaka soon sees Odokawa driving by in his taxi.
| 5 | "Don't Call Me an Idol"; Transliteration: "Aidoru Nante Yobanai de" (Japanese: アイドルなんて呼ばないで) | Shigeki Awai | Wanqian Xie, Tsutomu Ōno, Chihaya Tanaka | Hiromi Nakayama | May 4, 2021 |
Yamamoto hails Odokawa's taxi, taking Mitsuya and Ichimura separately to a studio in Sasazuka. Mitsuya likes fried chicken, while Ichimura likes bath bombs. As Odokawa then takes Yamamoto to his agency office in Kamimeguro, Odokawa lets slip that he dropped off another girl near the agency office two weeks ago. Outside the agency office, Odokawa refuses to sell his dashcam data to Yamamoto. Meanwhile, Tanaka trails Odokawa in another taxi to his house, unbeknownst to Odokawa. Later at night, Goriki tells Odokawa that he is planning to temporarily close his clinic in fear of being blamed for the missing medications even if Shirakawa is the culprit. Afterwards, Dobu confirms that Shirakawa was paying off her debt by selling him the stolen medications. Odokawa returns the favor by mentioning that Yamamoto wanted to buy the dashcam data. Kakihana goes out on a date with Ichimura at a fancy restaurant. While scrolling through her cellphone, Ichimura discovers a photo of Imai supposedly winning ¥1,000,000,000 from the lottery, as well as a viral video of Kabasawa swearing to hunt down Dobu. As Kakihana pays for the meal in cash, his dropped receipt reveals a loan totaling ¥100,000.
| 6 | "Let Me Hear You Say, "What the Hell?""; Transliteration: "Nandeyanen ga Kikitai yo" (Japanese: なんでやねんが聞きたいよ) | Ken'ichi Nishida | Tetsurō Taira, Hitomi Kōno | Shinobu Ōkawa | May 11, 2021 |
Since Odokawa's lucky numbers enabled Imai to win the lottery, Imai decides to return the favor by treating Odokawa at a cabaret club where he works part-time. Although Odokawa feels socially awkward, he is forced to flee in the restroom when Tanaka shows up wearing a skull mask and holding the revolver. Also working part-time there, Shibagaki risks his life while managing to distract Tanaka. At the park, Odokawa begrudgingly learns that Shirakawa initially approached him in hopes of using his taxi in a crime scene getaway when Dobu plans a future bank robbery, as well as the fact that she still owes Dobu ¥3,000,000 in extortionate interest after being indebted to him for four years. The next day, Dobu shows Odokawa a viral video of Kabasawa accusing Dobu for the shooting incident at the cabaret club. Offering to restore Goriki's clinic and find Tanaka if Odokawa will help catch Kabasawa, Dobu agrees on Odokawa's condition to give Shirakawa debt relief. Revealed to be secretly dating Nikaidо, Baba has a packed schedule of television appearances and has trouble finding time to practice his comedy routine with Shibagaki.
| 7 | "Trick or Treat"; Transliteration: "Torikku oa Torīto" (Japanese: トリック・オア・トリート) | Mayu Numayama | Takayuki Shimura, Aoi Yamato, Yukie Kinoshita | Hiromi Nakayama | May 18, 2021 |
Unable to find Kabasawa, Odokawa return home to a bullet shot through his window into a wall. Odokawa brings Koshiro to his house and shows the recovered cartridge. Koshiro learns that Kenshiro is in cahoots with Dobu, who is rivals with Yano working for Kuroda, while Kabasawa's viral videos, Tanaka's shooting incident, Shirakawa's medication theft and Goriki's clinic shutdown all revolve around this. Before Koshiro can inspect Odokawa's bedroom, he gets dispatched to deal with an unidentified female body found at the mouth of the Sumida River. After learning that Shirakawa formerly collaborated with Dobu, Goriki asks her to help him treat Odokawa. Kakihana meets with Ichimura at a construction site, only to be captured by Yamamoto and Sekiguchi. In Shibuya, Odokawa accidentally bumps into Yano riding a scooter. At a diner, Odokawa meets with Dobu wearing a skull mask. Mystery Kiss performs during a Halloween festival. Spotting a man wearing a skull mask, Odokawa and Dobu discover that he is not Tanaka. Wearing a clown mask, Kabasawa makes a video recording on his cellphone and flees from Odokawa and Dobu. Revealed to be working with Sekiguchi, Yano prepares to torture Kakihana in a warehouse at Shibaura Wharf.
| 8 | "Bless you" | Sayaka Yamai | Aki Yamagata, Kazuyuki Toshida | Shinobu Ōkawa, Ryō Satō | May 25, 2021 |
After torturing Kakihana, Yano realizes that Kakihana is drowning in debt. Odokawa is contacted by Yamamoto requesting to take him and Ichimura to the warehouse at Shibaura Wharf. Initiating Dobu's plan, Odokawa offers to sell the dashcam data for ¥1,000,000,000 before dropping off Yamamoto and Ichimura. As Yamamoto informs Sekiguchi that Ichimura wants out on the badger games, Ichimura tells Kakihana that she never enjoyed spending time with him. Goriki invites Odokawa to hang out at the izakaya, trying to uncover the source of Odokawa's apparent synesthesia. As Yamamoto tells Sekiguchi that Imai has ¥1,000,000,000 and may spend it on Mystery Kiss, Yano suspects that Dobu is somehow involved and plans to make use of Kakihana. Later on, Odokawa secretly makes an audio recording of Dobu planning to rob Imai when he withdraws his lottery winning from the bank, as well as the fact that Kenshiro is in cahoots with Dobu. After sending the audio recording to Koshiro, Odokawa tries to convince Imai to edit his social media post saying that he pretended to win the lottery. When Imai mentions that things are finally starting to turn around, Odokawa realizes that Kakihana has been kidnapped.
| 9 | "The Hero's Melancholy"; Transliteration: "Hīrō no Yūutsu" (Japanese: ヒーローの憂鬱) | Ken'ichi Nishida | Miyō Ōno, Yukie Kinoshita | Hiromi Nakayama | June 1, 2021 |
After having listened to the audio recording, Koshiro tells Odokawa that it is outside his jurisdiction to arrest Kenshiro. Elsewhere, Kabasawa is sleeping with rabbit freelancer Reina, who follows Kabasawa on social media. As Kabasawa has regrets about being an internet celebrity, he receives a message from Odokawa to meet Dobu at Shibaura Wharf. While driving Dobu to Shibaura Wharf, Odokawa is soon shot at by Tanaka driving a white van. Odokawa manages to lose Tanaka and heads towards Shibaura Wharf. As Odokawa and Dobu approach the warehouse, Dobu fights Sekiguchi while Odokawa rescues Kakihana. After being shot in the leg by an unseen figure, Dobu subdues Kabasawa when he shows up to take the credit. Kabasawa is forced to shut down his social media as payback for stirring an online mob against Dobu. The next day, Goriki meets Odokawa's pug landlady. She mentions that Odokawa has been supported throughout childhood by a mysterious foundation who compensated for his rent and basic necessities, but Odokawa insisted on returning the extra money when he started working as a taxi driver. Goriki then learns that both of Odokawa's parents are dead.
| 10 | "We Have No Tomorrow"; Transliteration: "Oretachi ni Asu wa nai" (Japanese: 俺たちに明日はない) | Rokusuke Okimitsu | Reiko Arai, Sayuri Kuroda | Shinobu Ōkawa | June 8, 2021 |
When Homosapiens loses a comedy competition, Shibagaki refuses to team up with giraffe high schoolboy Satoshi Nagashima, who is an obsessive fan of Homosapiens. After seeing a social media post of Imai holding a fake lottery ticket, Yano quickly sees through the ruse as the lottery ticket was poorly edited. Meanwhile, Odokawa tries to loop Yamamoto into taking down Yano. Yamamoto uses a belt in an attempt to strangle Odokawa, who is saved when Shirakawa timely arrives and performs capoeira on Yamamoto. With Yamamoto now defeated, he agrees to help take down Yano in exchange for the protection of Mystery Kiss. Odokawa eventually finds a GPS device hidden in the back seat of the taxi. At the sauna, Odokawa meets Kuroda, who believes that Odokawa is probably not the culprit behind the missing girl case. Sekiguchi manages to pinpoint the whereabouts of Imai from his recent social media posts. Dobu tells Odokawa the stages of the bank robbery plan, code-named "Odd Taxi". The next day, Odokawa relays his own twists of this plan to Yamamoto and Imai individually. As the news reports that the dead body has been identified as Mitsuya, Odokawa mutters that it is not her.
| 11 | "If We Could Go Back to That Day"; Transliteration: "Ano Hi ni Modore Tara" (Japanese: あの日に戻れたら) | Hideaki Ōba | Hitomi Kōno, Tetsurō Taira | Hiromi Nakayama | June 15, 2021 |
In the past, after Mystery Kiss was formed, Nikaido exchanged contact info with Baba on a train. When Mystery Kiss rehearsed in front of a pig producer, he wanted Mitsuya to be the lead singer. Nikaido called Mitsuya to meet at Yamamoto's agency office, but Nikaido arrived there only to find Mitsuya already dead. Yano and Sekiguchi were called in to help Nikaido and Yamamoto dispose of Mitsuya's body into Shibaura Wharf and file a missing person report. Yamamoto then introduced Sakura Wadagaki, resembling Mitsuya, as a new member of Mystery Kiss. Despite the missing person report being quietly withdrawn, there was a loose end with Odokawa's dashcam data. In the present, Dobu tells Odokawa that the bank robbery might get foiled. Baba abruptly decides to break ties with Shibagaki right before the comedy competition's loser bracket. Goriki learns that Odokawa's parents crashed their van into Takeshiba Wharf in a forced double suicide, while Odokawa escaped on his own in critical condition. During a press conference, Yamamoto admits that Wadagaki replaced Mitsuya when the latter went missing, revealing that Mitsuya was Shofutei's daughter. Kenshiro talks with Odokawa about Koshiro. Yano and Sekiguchi escort Imai to the bank in a black van, while Dobu watches nearby from another black van.
| 12 | "Not Enough"; Transliteration: "Tarinai Futari" (Japanese: たりないふたり) | Mayu Numayama | Aoi Yamato, Takayuki Shimura | Shinobu Ōkawa, Ryō Satō | June 22, 2021 |
Yano and Sekiguchi unknowingly receive nine out of ten suitcases of counterfeit money before Dobu receives the nine suitcases of genuine money shortly after. During the comedy competition's loser bracket, Homosapiens performs an onstage comedy routine, but Shibagaki soon breaks down in front of Baba. At a bridge near Hinode Wharf, Kenshiro pulls over Yano and Sekiguchi, while releasing Imai. Just as Yano discovers the nine suitcases of counterfeit money, Dobu speeds off in his van, having taken the tenth suitcase of genuine money. Dobu meets with Odokawa, who drives to a parking lot in Shimbashi in order to collect the other nine suitcases of genuine money. Odokawa and Dobu spot Tanaka holding the revolver, though Tanaka assumably used up all six bullets. As Tanaka demands for an apology from Odokawa, the rare eraser falls out of Odokawa's coat pocket. Discovering that Dobu was behind the online auction scam and was ranked first on Zooden, Tanaka shoots Dobu's abdomen before running off in panic. Odokawa abandons Dobu and prepares to leave the nine suitcases of genuine money in Dobu's van for Imai. After having hijacked Kenshiro's cop car, Yano and Sekiguchi engage in a car chase against Odokawa.
| 13 | "Where To?"; Transliteration: "Dochira Made?" (Japanese: どちらまで？) | Sayaka Yamai | Miyō Ōno, Aki Yamagata, Kazuyuki Toshida | Hiromi Nakayama | June 29, 2021 |
Being an introvert during childhood and having an affinity to zoo animals, Odokawa woke up in a hospital after his parents committed a double suicide. He suffered from a mental condition called visual agnosia caused by executive dysfunction, imagining everyone as anthropomorphic zoo animals. The car chase, which was reported on the news, ends with Odokawa driving off the bridge and plummeting into the river. The other main characters, who have their own struggles, witness this event. Shirakawa saves Odokawa from drowning in the river. Odokawa sees everyone as humans when he regains consciousness in an ambulance and is taken to the hospital. Koshiro was the one who previously shot Dobu in the leg. Nikaido is arrested as a murder suspect, while Yamamoto, Yano and Sekiguchi are arrested as accomplices. Imai gives Odokawa ¥100,000,000 recovered from the trunk of the taxi. At the sauna, Odokawa gives the money to Kuroda, who has been supporting orphans. Odokawa arrives home and learns that a real cat was living in his closet. The other main characters are seen turning over a new leaf. Revealed to be the one who actually murdered Mitsuya, Wadagaki enters Odokawa's taxi, hoping to tie up loose ends.

=== Audio drama ===
An audio drama ran concurrently to the anime, being uploaded on the anime's official YouTube channel, with the first episode released on April 6, 2021. The drama follows conversations between characters transmitted from a bugged pen which is shown throughout the series.

=== Manga ===
A manga adaptation written by Kazuya Konomoto and illustrated by Takeichi Abaraya began serialization on Shogakukan's Superior Dalpana digital manga site on January 15, 2021, and ended on July 22, 2022. It was collected into five tankōbon volumes.

During their panel at Anime NYC 2023, Denpa announced that they licensed the manga for English publication.

A manga series based on a new project titled RoOT/Route of Odd Taxi was serialized on the same platform from February 2023 to April 2025.

==== Volumes ====
| No. | Original release date | Original ISBN | English release date | English ISBN |
|---|---|---|---|---|
| 1 | March 30, 2021 | 978-4-09-861014-3 | December 22, 2026 | 978-1-63-442856-9 |
| 2 | June 30, 2021 | 978-4-09-861089-1 | — | — |
| 3 | November 30, 2021 | 978-4-09-861192-8 | — | — |
| 4 | March 30, 2022 | 978-4-09-861294-9 | — | — |
| 5 | July 29, 2022 | 978-4-09-861385-4 | — | — |

=== Novel ===
A novel adaptation by Manabu Wakui, based on Kazuya Konomoto's script, was released on July 6, 2021. The novel is a retelling of several key moments of the anime from the point of view of different characters.

=== Films ===
On December 25, 2021, an anime film adaptation titled Odd Taxi: In the Woods was announced. The cast and staff from the series returned to reprise their roles. It was released in Japan on April 1, 2022.

Two compilation films of the series were released in September 2025.

=== Stage play ===
A stage play, subtitled Diamond wa Kizutsukanai (金剛石(ダイヤモンド)は傷つかない, Daiyamondo wa Kizutsukanai; lit. 'Diamonds Will Not Be Damaged'), was originally scheduled to run at the Shibuya Cultural Center Owada's Denshō Hall from July 7–18, 2022; however, it was delayed due to the COVID-19 pandemic and later ran the at the Otemachi Mitsui Hall in Tokyo from January 25–31, 2023, and at the Cool Japan Park Osaka TT Hall in Osaka on February 4 and 5 of that same year. It starred Yui Oguri as Rui Nikaidо, Nonoka Yamaguchi as Yuki Mitsuya, Hitomi Suzuki as Shiho Ichimura, and Hiyori Hamagishi as Sakura Wadagaki.

=== Music ===
Episode 6 featured the special ending theme 壁の向こうに笑い声を聞きましたか (Kabe no Mukou ni Waraigoe wo Kikimashita ka, Did you hear the laughter beyond the wall?) by Japanese singer Tony Frank. METEOR, the voice actor for Yano, released an album titled 2019 under the SUMMIT label that features compositions from the perspective of his character.

=== Other media ===
A Twitter account was set up prior to the show's release featuring tweets written by hippopotamus character Kabasawa Taichi throughout the show's events under the handle @kbsw_t. The most popular post under the handle was posted on October 10, 2020, and features a selfie between the protagonist Odokawa and Kabasawa, with the tweet attracting attention in April when the episode aired in Japan.

== Reception ==
Odd Taxi was listed by The New Yorker's "Best TV of 2021" list as an honorable mention. Reviewer Doreen St. Félix stated that the show's "noir humor ... made [her] feel crazy—in a good way". The show was named as the Best Anime of the Year by IGN, describing Odd Taxi as "a fascinating mystery drama with incredible writing, deeply developed and memorable characters, and a unique art style that stands out". Austin Jones and Reuben Baron listed Odd Taxi as the "Best New Anime Series" of 2021 in Paste, describing the show as "one of the best anime of recent years, and unlike anything else out there right now" remarking on the "banter between the cast's characters [revealing] a deeply human view of modern life".

=== Awards and nominations ===
| Year | Award | Category | Recipient | Result | Ref. |
|---|---|---|---|---|---|
| 2021 | IGN Awards | Best Anime Series | Odd Taxi | Won | |
| 2021 | Ursa Major Awards | Best Dramatic Series | Odd Taxi | Nominated | |
| 2022 | 6th Crunchyroll Anime Awards | Anime of the Year | Odd Taxi | Nominated | |
| 2022 | 6th Crunchyroll Anime Awards | Best Protagonist | Odokawa | Won | |
| 2022 | 6th Crunchyroll Anime Awards | Best Antagonist | Yano | Nominated | |
| 2022 | 6th Crunchyroll Anime Awards | Best Boy | Odokawa | Nominated | |
| 2022 | 6th Crunchyroll Anime Awards | Best Director | Baku Kinoshita | Won | |
| 2022 | 6th Crunchyroll Anime Awards | Best Comedy | Odd Taxi | Nominated | |
| 2022 | 6th Crunchyroll Anime Awards | Best Drama | Odd Taxi | Nominated | |
| 2022 | 6th Crunchyroll Anime Awards | Best Character Design | Baku Kinoshita and Hiromi Nakayama | Nominated | |
| 2022 | 6th Crunchyroll Anime Awards | Best Score | PUNPEE, VaVa, and OMSB | Nominated | |
| 2022 | 6th Crunchyroll Anime Awards | Best Opening Sequence | "ODDTAXI" by Skirt and PUNPEE | Nominated | |
| 2022 | 6th Crunchyroll Anime Awards | Best Voice Artist Performance (Japanese) | Natsuki Hanae as Odokawa | Nominated | |
| 2022 | 25th Japan Media Arts Festival | New Face Award | Odd Taxi | Won | |
