= Ebisunishi =

Ebisunishi 恵比寿西
- Neighborhood
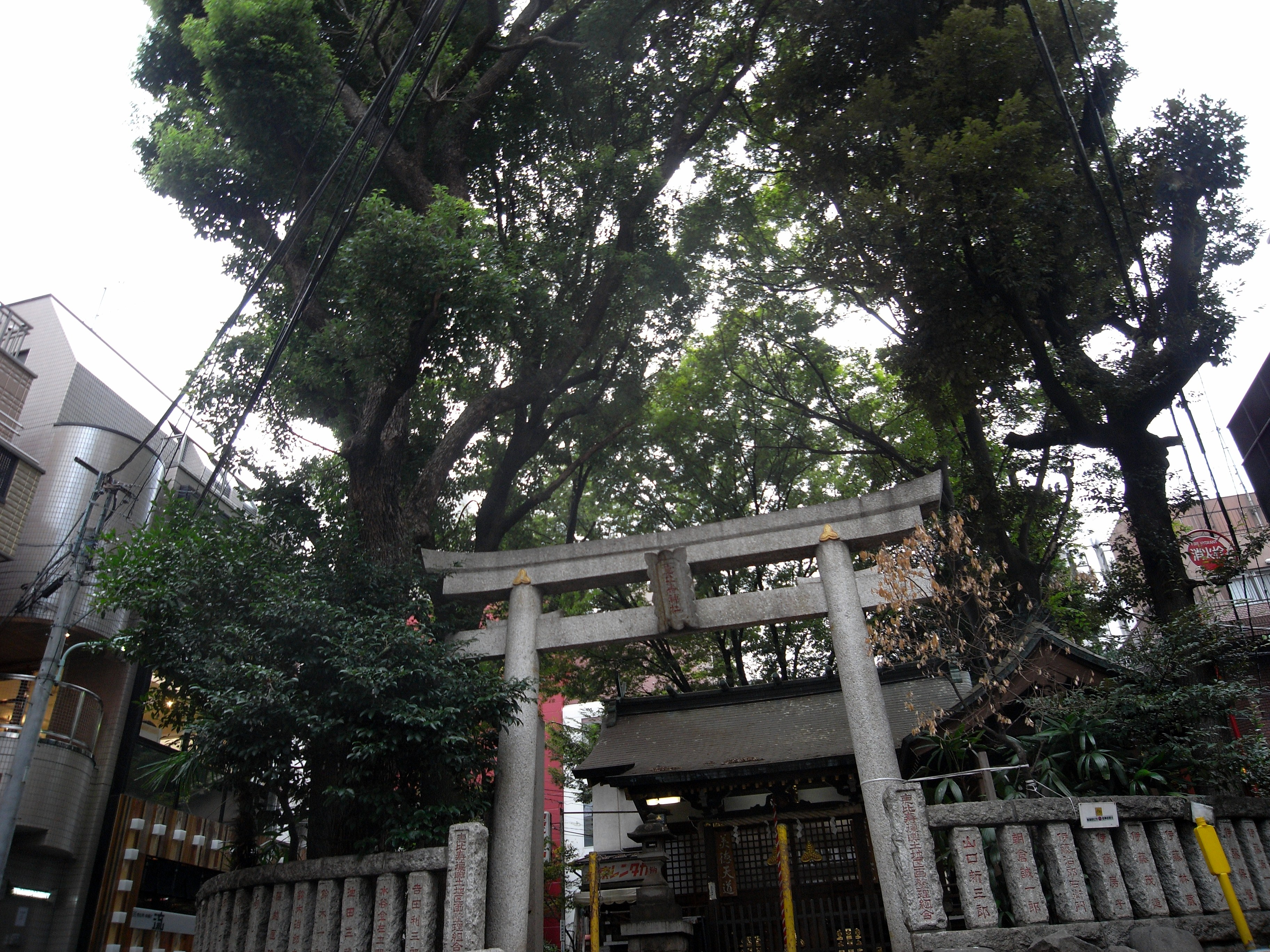
- Ebisu Shrine
- Interactive map of Ebisunishi
- Coordinates: 35°38′55″N 139°42′23″E
- Country: Japan
- City: Tokyo
- Special ward: Shibuya

Ebisunishi (恵比寿西) is a neighborhood in Shibuya, Tokyo, Japan. Located near Ebisu Station and Daikanyama Station, it houses various luxury boutiques and small stores, as well as sophisticated residences. Historically, the Ebisunishi neighborhood corresponds to the areas in six former neighborhoods, which includes Shimodori 4-chome (下通四丁目) and Shimodori 5-chome (下通五丁目), Kokaidodori (公会堂通), Nagayatocho (長谷戸町), Shurakucho (衆楽町), and Daikanyamacho (代官山町). Although these old names are today largely forgotten, two of them, Nagayatocho and Daikanyamacho, still survive as the name of an elementary school (Nagayato Elementary School) and an official sub-ward neighborhood (Daikanyamachō, Shibuya).

Points of interest in Ebisunishi includes Ebisu Shrine. When the shrine was built is unclear, but thought to be between 113 and 115 AD. Deities to which the shrine is dedicated include Kunitokotachi, Toyokumono, Tsukugui, Ootonobe, Izanagi, and Izanami.

Located in this neighborhood is Himawari Theatre Group, a Japanese theatrical company that specializes in junior actors.

== Education ==
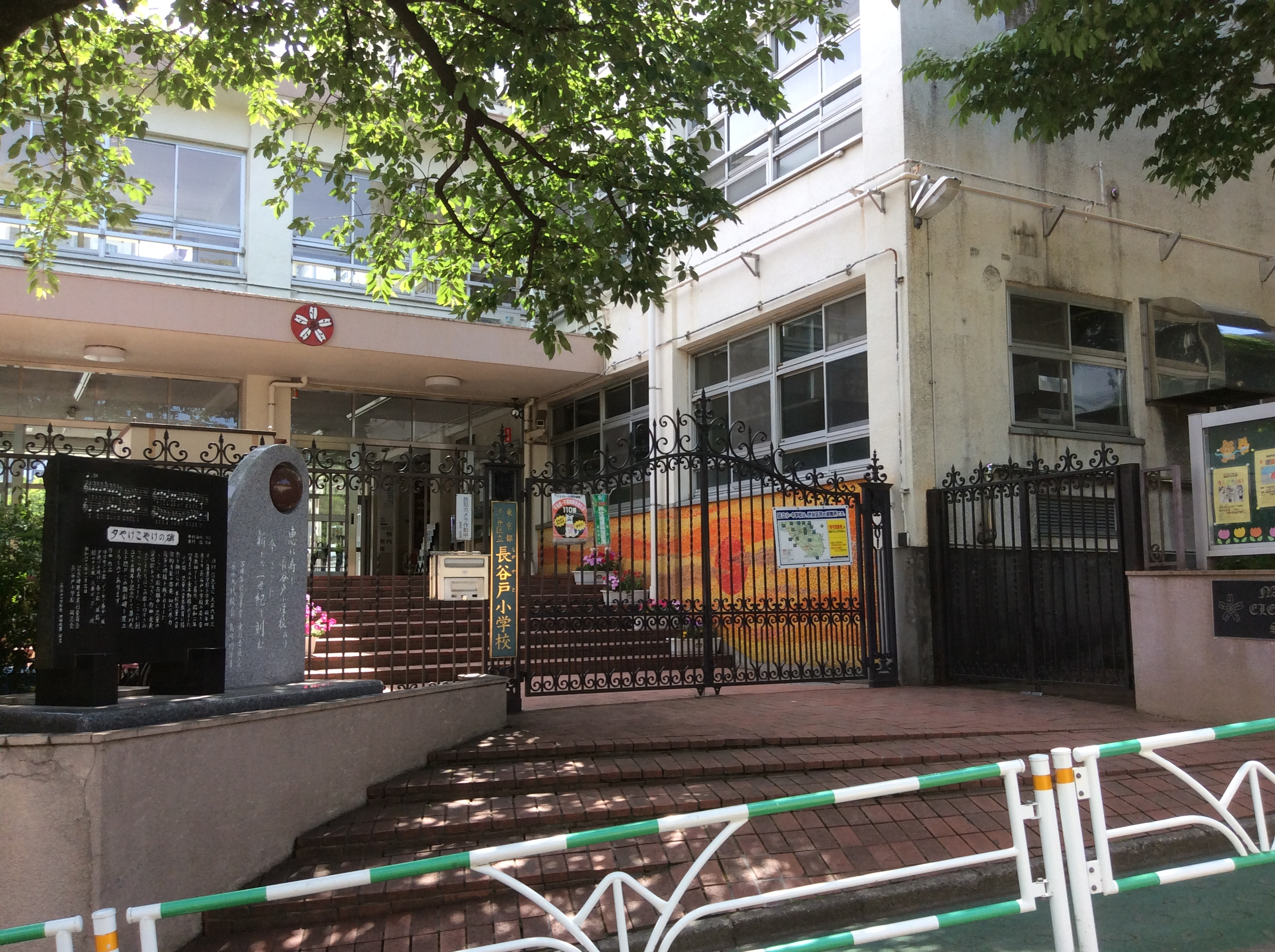
Nagayato Elementary School (長谷戸小学校)

Shibuya Board of Education operates public elementary and junior high schools.

Ebisunishi 1-chome and Ebisunishi 2-chome 1-4 and 6-20 ban are zoned to Nagayato Elementary School (長谷戸小学校). Ebisunishi 2-chome 5 and 21-ban are zoned to Sarugaku Elementary School (猿楽小学校). All of Ebisunishi (1 and 2-chome) is zoned to Hachiyama Junior High School (鉢山中学校).
