= Seiyu Awards =

Award ceremony for voice acting in Japan

Seiyu Awards 声優アワード
- Previous: 20th Seiyu Awards; March 15, 2026; Next: 21st Seiyu Awards; March 13, 2027
- Awarded for: Voice acting in Japanese media
- Country: Japan
- First award: March 3, 2007; 19 years ago
- Website: seiyuawards.jp

The Seiyu Awards (声優アワード, Seiyū Awādo) are award ceremonies for the recognition of voice acting talent for outstanding performance in anime and other media in Japan. The first Seiyu Awards were held on March 3, 2007, at the 3D Theatre of the Tokyo Anime Center in Akihabara.

Ryo Koarai compared the awards to the Academy Awards.

== Awards ceremonies ==
Ceremony	Date	Venue
1st Seiyu Awards	March 3, 2007	Akiba 3D Theater
2nd Seiyu Awards	March 8, 2008	UDX Theater
3rd Seiyu Awards	March 7, 2009	UDX Theater
4th Seiyu Awards	March 6, 2010	UDX Theater
5th Seiyu Awards	March 5, 2011	UDX Theater
6th Seiyu Awards	March 3, 2012	JOQR Media Plus Hall
7th Seiyu Awards	March 2, 2013	JOQR Media Plus Hall
8th Seiyu Awards	March 1, 2014	JOQR Media Plus Hall
9th Seiyu Awards	March 7, 2015	JOQR Media Plus Hall
10th Seiyu Awards	March 12, 2016	JOQR Media Plus Hall
11th Seiyu Awards	March 18, 2017	JOQR Media Plus Hall
12th Seiyu Awards	March 3, 2018	JOQR Media Plus Hall
13th Seiyu Awards	March 9, 2019	JOQR Media Plus Hall
14th Seiyu Awards	March 7, 2020	No ceremony due to COVID-19 pandemic
15th Seiyu Awards	March 6, 2021	JOQR Media Plus Hall
16th Seiyu Awards	March 5, 2022	JOQR Media Plus Hall
17th Seiyu Awards	March 11, 2023	JOQR Media Plus Hall
18th Seiyu Awards	March 9, 2024	JOQR Media Plus Hall
19th Seiyu Awards	March 15, 2025	JOQR Media Plus Hall
20th Seiyu Awards	March 15, 2026	JOQR Media Plus Hall

== Categories ==
=== Current categories ===
==== Acting ====
- Best Actors in a Leading Role
- Best Actors in a Supporting Role
- Best New Actors

==== Achievement ====
- Outstanding Actors

==== Kids/Family ====
- Outstanding Work for Kids & Families

==== Music ====
- Best Music Performance

==== Personality ====
- Best Radio Personality

==== Video Games ====
- Best Game

==== Special ====
- Kei Tomiyama Memorial Award
- Kazue Takahashi Memorial Award
- Synergy Award
- Most Valuable Seiyū Award
- Foreign Movie/Series Award
- Influencer Award

=== Defunct and altered categories ===
==== Acting ====
- Actor in a Leading Role (2007-2022)
- Actress in a Leading Role (2007-2022)
- Actors in a Supporting Roles (2007-2022)
- Actresses in a Supporting Roles (2007-2022)
- Rookie Actor (2007-2022)
- Rookie Actress (2007-2022)
- Overseas Fan's Award (2009-2012)
- Most Votes Award (2012-2016)

==== Special ====
- Special Achievement Award (2007-2017)

== See also ==
- List of animation awards
