= RoOT/Route of Odd Taxi =

Japanese manga series

- First tankōbon volume cover, featuring Sato (left) and Rena (right)

RoOT / ルート オブ オッドタクシー (RoOT/ Rūto Obu Oddo Takushī)
- Genre: Mystery
- Manga
- Written by: Kazuya Konomoto
- Illustrated by: Takeichi Abaraya
- Published by: Shogakukan
- Imprint: Big Comics
- Magazine: Superior Dalpana
- Original run: February 24, 2023 – April 25, 2025
- Volumes: 6
- Television drama
- Directed by: Takafumi Tsuchiya
- Written by: Takafumi Tsuchiya
- Studio: P.I.C.S.
- Licensed by: Crunchyroll
- Original network: TV Tokyo
- Original run: April 3, 2024 – June 4, 2024
- Episodes: 10
- icon

RoOT/Route of Odd Taxi (Japanese: RoOT / ルート オブ オッドタクシー, Hepburn: RoOT/ Rūto Obu Oddo Takushī) is a Japanese manga series written by Kazuya Konomoto and illustrated by Takeichi Abaraya. It is a spin-off to the Odd Taxi series. It was serialised on Shogakukan's Superior Dalpana website from February 2023 to April 2025, with its chapters collected in six tankōbon volumes. A television drama adaptation aired on TV Tokyo from April to June 2024.

== Plot ==
Taking place at the same time as the events of Odd Taxi, two detectives from the Ibusuki Detective Agency (IDA), Rena and Sato, are tasked to investigate whether a banker's having an affair. But when a yakuza gangster named Dobu steals the evidence, the two are forced to take up another job when Taeko Harada wants them to tail Hiroshi Odokawa and find out the extent of his involvement with the missing girl in Nerima.

Rena subsequently gets involved because she knows the missing girl on a personal level.

== Characters ==
Rena (玲奈)
A private investigator who works at the Ibusuki Detective Agency. She's the partner of Sato, who's recently recruited to the IDA.
Sato (佐藤, Satō)
A new recruit to the IDA. He's known for getting into unusual situations.
Ibusuki (指宿)
The head of the IDA.
Sekido (赤道, Sekidō)
A fixer who assists Rena and Sato in their detective work.

== Media ==
=== Manga ===
Written by Kazuya Konomoto and illustrated by Takeichi Abaraya, RoOT/Route of Odd Taxi started in Shogakukan's Superior Dalpana website from February 24, 2023, to April 25, 2025. The first volume was released on May 30, 2023, and the sixth and last on May 30, 2025.

No.	Release date	ISBN
1	May 30, 2023	978-4-09-861807-1
2	September 28, 2023	978-4-09-862523-9
3	December 27, 2023	978-4-09-862622-9
4	May 30, 2024	978-4-09-862802-5
5	November 28, 2024	978-4-09-863071-4
6	May 30, 2025	978-4-09-863429-3

=== Drama ===
In January 2024, it was announced that RoOT/Route of Odd Taxi would be adapted into a television drama, which premiered on TV Tokyo on April 3 of the same year. (Note: TV Tokyo listed the series premiere on April 2 at 24:30, which is effectively April 3 at 12:30 a.m. JST.) The show is also available on various streaming sites in Japan including Netflix, U-NEXT, TSUTAYA DISCAS, Hulu Japan, ABEMA, Amazon Prime, Disney+ and DMM TV.

The show stars Yuumi Kawai as Rena and Ryota Bando as Satō. It is directed and written by Takafumi Tsuchiya.

The series' opening theme is "Chikagoro" (近頃; lit. 'These Days') by Bialystocks, while Sirup and Sumin performed the ending theme song "Roller Coaster". Crunchyroll has licensed the series for worldwide streaming outside of Japan in North America, Central America, South America, Europe, Africa, Oceania, the Middle East, and CIS countries.

No.	Title (Note: All English titles are taken from Crunchyroll.)	Directed by	Written by	Original release date
1	"This is the Ibusuki Detective Agency"; Transliteration: "Kochira Ibusuki tantei jimusho" (Japanese: こちら指宿探偵事務所)	Takafumi Tsuchiya	Takafumi Tsuchiya	April 3, 2024
Nineteen-year-old Rena and twenty-four-year-old rookie Sato work for the Ibusuki Detective agency as private investigators. They stake out outside a love hotel to get photos of a banker cheating on his wife, Rena and Sato’s client. Despite acting clumsily, Sato's luck helps them get good photos; however, the camera and laptop containing the photos are stolen by a yakuza named Dobu, an act witnessed by a homeless passerby. Rena and Sato take refuge in an izakaya run by Taeko Harada, who hires Rena and Sato to investigate a mysterious regular, a taxi driver named Hiroshi Odokawa. The detective agency's head, Ibusuki, becomes preoccupied with the disappearance of a high school girl, but demands Rena and Sato focus on Odokawa as training for Sato. Sato witnesses police officer Kenshiro Daimon seizing Odokawa's rear-facing dashcam data, suspecting Odokawa of kidnapping the missing girl, (Note: As depicted in the Odd Taxi episode "The Eccentric Driver".) as she had ridden his taxi two days prior. Rena and Sato visit an electronics specialist who replaces Odokawa's dashcam with one Rena and Sato can monitor and track. After looking through Ibusuki's files, Rena discovers the missing girl is Yuki Mitsuya, her friend from high school.
2	"Fancy Merch"; Transliteration: "Fanshīguzzu" (Japanese: ファンシーグッズ)	Takafumi Tsuchiya	Takafumi Tsuchiya	April 10, 2024
In the past, Rena and her friend Kanon, twelfth-year high school students, and Yuki, an eleventh-year student, discuss a keychain Rena put on her bag; Yuki asks to have it once Rena graduates. In the present, Rena and Kanon attend a concert for Mystery Kiss, an idol group which has a member with Yuki's name and who wears a mask, but they discover the two are not the same person. Rena and Sato learn from another taxi driver that Odokawa recorded seeing customers as monkeys and gibbons, and that he is rumored to do morally gray work. They interview the homeless man about Odokawa's taxi, who says he witnessed Yuki wearing a mask get out of a taxi and enter a building, Harada Building 3, but never come out. He also says there is frequently a large car parked in front of the building. He sells Rena a broken phone with a keychain like her old one attached, which she gives to the electronics specialist to restore the data. Rena and Sato learn from Taeko that a group of landsharks took over Harada Building 3 fifteen years prior. Dobu, concerned about his rival Haruhito Yano, meets with his boss, Shigeru Kuroda, who says he is considering retiring. The police's investigation into Yuki's disappearance is stopped after her manager, Fuyuki Yamamoto, asserts she has contacted him. Sato tells Rena about a time he lost an online auction for a unique novelty eraser shaped like rakugo performer Donraku Shofutei, (Note: The auction is depicted in the Odd Taxi episode "Tanaka's Revolution".) causing Rena to have a realization.
3	"Love Thy Neighbor"; Transliteration: "Nanji Rinjin o Aiseyo" (Japanese: 汝隣人を愛せよ)	Takafumi Tsuchiya	Takafumi Tsuchiya	April 17, 2024
Donraku, Yuki's father, behaves strangely on a talk show. Rena meets with Donraku, who says he did not directly hire Ibusuki. Donraku was told that Yuki ran away and said not to follow her, but he is skeptical. Ibusuki goes golfing with Kuroda, who he previously worked with; Kuroda tells Ibusuki that Rena visited Donraku, while Ibusuki gives Kuroda secret information about why the search for Yuki is delayed. At Taeko's izakaya, Sato witnesses Odokawa's friend, Eiji Kakihana, show Odokawa he has matched with an eighteen-year-old girl on a dating app. (Note: As depicted in the Odd Taxi episode "Beware of Borrowed Plumes".) Kuroda learns Dobu assaulted Sato and asks Dobu to protect Yano. Rena goes on a date with Taichi Kabasawa, who has become a public figure trying to hunt down Dobu, (Note: As introduced in the Odd Taxi episode "Don't Call Me an Idol".) and goads him on to catch Dobu so he can retrieve the stolen laptop. Sato sees dashcam footage of Dobu threatening Odokawa in his taxi and tails Dobu to his hideout alone, but is caught and forced to work for him without telling anyone. Odokawa tells Yamamoto he remembers driving the missing Yuki, (Note: As depicted in the Odd Taxi episode "Don't Call Me an Idol".) which Yamamoto tells Yano about. Rena visits the Mitsuya household.
4	"All Kinds of Dads"; Transliteration: "Ironna Papa" (Japanese: いろんなパパ)	Takafumi Tsuchiya	Takafumi Tsuchiya	April 24, 2024
5	"10 PM in Tokyo"; Transliteration: "Tōkyō wa yoru no 22-ji" (Japanese: 東京は夜の22時)	Takafumi Tsuchiya	Takafumi Tsuchiya	May 1, 2024
6	"It's tough being an idol" Transliteration: "Aidoru wa taihen" (Japanese: アイドルは大変)	Takafumi Tsuchiya	Takafumi Tsuchiya	May 7, 2024
7	"The Price of Regret"; Transliteration: "Kōkai no nedan" (Japanese: 後悔の値段)	Takafumi Tsuchiya	Takafumi Tsuchiya	May 14, 2024
8	"The Trajectory of a Fall"; Transliteration: "Tenraku no kiseki" (Japanese: 転落の軌跡)	Takafumi Tsuchiya	Takafumi Tsuchiya	May 21, 2024
9	"I am a cat" Transliteration: "Wagahai wa neko de aru" (Japanese: 吾輩は猫である)	Takafumi Tsuchiya	Takafumi Tsuchiya	May 28, 2024
10	"Children are the Clamp"; Transliteration: "Ko wa kasugai" (Japanese: 子は鎹)	Takafumi Tsuchiya	Takafumi Tsuchiya	June 4, 2024
