= Manatsu Murakami =

Japanese voice actress

- 村上 まなつ
- Born: Kanagawa Prefecture
- Occupations: Voice actress, singer
- Years active: 2018–present
- Agent: 81 Produce
- Known for: Cue! as Yuzuha Kujō; Odd Taxi as Yuki Mitsuya; Akebi's Sailor Uniform as Komichi Akebi

Manatsu Murakami (村上 まなつ, Murakami Manatsu) is a Japanese voice actress and singer from Kanagawa Prefecture, affiliated with 81 Produce. She is known for her roles as Yuzuha Kujō in Cue! and Komichi Akebi in Akebi's Sailor Uniform. She is also a member of the idol group Dialogue+.

== Career ==
Murakami has a background in dance and cheerleading and was part of a light music band while in high school. She started her career after graduating from the Japan Narration Actor Institute. She had been inspired to pursue a career in voice acting after seeing the performances of Miyuki Sawashiro in Hunter × Hunter and Kokoro Connect. She joined the voice acting talent agency Arise Project in 2018. In 2019, she became a member of the idol group Dialogue+. In 2019, she was cast as Yuzuha Kujō in the mixed-media project Cue!.

In 2021, Murakami played Yuki Mitsuya in the anime series Odd Taxi. She played her first lead role as Komichi Akebi in the 2022 anime series Akebi's Sailor Uniform.

== Filmography ==
=== Anime ===
2019

- To the Abandoned Sacred Beasts as Child E

2020

- Talentless Nana as Student

2021

- Odd Taxi as Yuki Mitsuya
- The Saint's Magic Power is Omnipotent as Maid
- Higehiro as Girl
- Drugstore in Another World as Girl

2022

- Cue! as Yuzuha Kujō
- Akebi's Sailor Uniform as Komichi Akebi
- Deaimon as Monaka, Mitsuru's brother
- My Stepmom's Daughter Is My Ex as Maki Sakamizu
- Black Summoner as Miyabi Kuromiya

2024

- The Strongest Magician in the Demon Lord's Army Was a Human as Alistair

2025

- I'm Living with an Otaku NEET Kunoichi!? as Himari Asakura
- Momentary Lily as Renge Kasumi
- Hands Off: Sawaranaide Kotesashi-kun as Chiyo Sayamagaoka

=== Films ===
2022

- Odd Taxi: In the Woods as Yuki Mitsuya

=== Video games ===
2022

- Azur Lane as HMS Plymouth

2023

- Blue Archive as Yukari Kadenokōji
