= Seiyu Award for Best Actors in a Leading Role =

Japanese voice acting award

- Awarded for: Best Performance by Actors in a Leading Role
- Country: Japan
- First award: 2023
- Currently held by: Kikunosuke Toya; Shion Wakayama (2026)
- Website: https://seiyuawards.jp/

The Seiyu Award for Best Actors in a Leading Role is one of the awards at the Seiyu Awards. It started in 2023 when the award committee decided not to separate it by gender anymore.

== Winner ==
| Winners | Agency | Ref |
|---|---|---|
2023
| Chika Anzai | Avex Pictures | |
| Takuya Eguchi | 81 Produce | |
| Atsumi Tanezaki | Haikyō | |
2024
| Kana Ichinose | Sigma Seven | |
| Kazuki Ura | VIMS | |
2025
| Miho Okasaki | I'm Enterprise | |
| Toshihiko Seki | 81 Produce | |
2026
| Kikunosuke Toya | Sony Music Artists | |
| Shion Wakayama | Himawari Theatre Group | |
