= Seiyu Award for Best Actor in a Leading Role =

Japanese voice acting award

- Awarded for: Best Performance by an Actor in a Leading Role
- Country: Japan
- First award: March 3, 2007; 19 years ago
- Final award: March 11, 2022; 4 years ago
- Last held by: Kensho Ono (2022)

Highlights
- Most awards: Daisuke Ono (2)
- Website: https://seiyuawards.jp/
- Related: Seiyu Award for Best Actors in a Leading Role

The Seiyu Award for Best Actor in a Leading Role is one of the awards at the Seiyu Awards. Starting in 2023, "Best Lead Voice Actor" is no longer separated by gender.

== Winners ==
Winners	Agency	Characters	Anime	Ref
2007
Jun Fukuyama	Production Baobab	Lelouch Lamperouge	Code Geass – Lelouch of the Rebellion	
2008
Mamoru Miyano	Himawari Theatre Group	Setsuna F. Seiei	Mobile Suit Gundam 00	
2009
Hiroshi Kamiya	Aoni Production	Takashi Natsume	Natsume Yujincho	
2010
Daisuke Ono	Mausu Promotion	Sebastian Michaelis	Black Butler	
2011
No award given	N/A	N/A	N/A	
2012
Hiroaki Hirata	Theater Company Subaru	Kotetsu T. Kaburagi	Tiger & Bunny	
2013
Yūki Kaji	Arts Vision	Issei Hyōdō	High School DxD	
2014
Yūki Kaji	VIMS	Eren Yeager	Attack on Titan	
2015
Daisuke Ono	Mausu Promotion	Shizuo Heiwajima	Durarara!!x2 Shō	
2016
Yoshitsugu Matsuoka	I'm Enterprise	Sōma Yukihira	Food Wars! Shokugeki no Soma: The Second Plate	
2017
Ryunosuke Kamiki	Amuse	Taki Tachibana	Your Name	
2018
Toshiyuki Toyonaga	Super Eccentric Theater	Yuri Katsuki	Yuri!!! on Ice	
2019
Yuma Uchida	I'm Enterprise	Ash Lynx	Banana Fish	
2020
Natsuki Hanae	Across Entertainment	Tanjiro Kamado	Demon Slayer: Kimetsu no Yaiba	
2021
Kenjiro Tsuda	Amuleto	Akihito Narihisago	Id: Invaded	
2022
Kensho Ono	Amino Produce	Hathaway Noa	Mobile Suit Gundam Hathaway	
