= Himawari Theatre Group =

Japanese theatrical company

The Himawari Theatre Group (劇団ひまわり, Gekidan Himawari) is a Japanese theatrical company connected to the Sunaoka Office talent agency. The company was founded by Tōzaburō Sunaoka in July 1952. It is located in Ebisunishi.

== Attached people ==
- Koichi Eguchi
- Daisuke Fujita
- Takuma Fujiwara
- Yutaro Honjo
- Kaoru Hyuga
- Takuya Kaihoku
- Kenjiro Kato
- Seishiro Kato
- Ryōhei Kimura
- Sachi Kokuryu
- Yu Kudo
- Yūna Mimura
- Yui Ishikawa
- Yume Miyamoto
- Shun Miyazato
- Yutaka Mizutani
- Rina Mogami
- Mirai Moriyama
- Sumire Morohoshi
- Arisa Ogasawara
- Eri Osonoe
- Hiroyuki Sanada
- Rio Sasaki
- Ryūji Satō
- Kouhei Shiota
- Sakura Sugawara
- Narumi Takahira
- Masato Takeuchi
- Shōhei Tanaka
- Jun Togawa
- Yūki Tokiwa
- Miyū Tsuzurahara
- Yūsuke Ushida
- Kōki Uchiyama
- Yūto Uemura
- Shion Wakayama
- Ken Watanabe
- Megumi Yamaguchi
- Maika Yoshida
- Takuto Yoshinaga

== Acting alumni ==
- Yōji Matsuda
- Toshinori Omi
- Kōji Seto
- Erika Asakura
- Noriko Kurosawa
- Judy Ongg
- Megumi Tsunematsu
- Yoko Yamashita
- Yoko Yamashita

== Voice-acting alumni ==
- Tōru Furuya
- Yū Hayashi
- Miyu Irino
- Hiroya Ishimaru
- Taiki Matsuno
- Ryūsei Nakao
- Takayuki Sakazume
- Kōzō Shioya
- Yoku Shioya
- Yūmi Kikuchi
- Mami Kingetsu
- Eri Sendai
- Yumi Sudō
- Minami Takayama
- Hiromi Tsuru
- Shimba Tsuchiya
- Miyano Mamoru

== Associated companies ==
- Blue Shuttle
- Sunaoka Office
