= Hirai =

Hirai may refer to:

== Places ==
- Hirai Edogawa, Tokyo, Japan
- Hirai Station (Tokyo)

== People with the surname ==
- Amon Hirai (平井 亜門; born 1995), Japanese model and actor
- Emi Hirai (平井 絵己; born 1986), Japanese ice dancer
- Hisashi Hirai (平井 久司; born 1959), Japanese animator, character designer, and manga artist
- Kanako Hirai (平井 香菜子; born 1984), Japanese volleyball player
- Kawato Hirai (川人 拓来; born 1997), Japanese professional wrestler (NJPW)
- Kazumasa Hirai (disambiguation), multiple people
- Kazuo Hirai (平井 一夫; born 1960), CEO Sony Corporation
- Ken Hirai (平井 堅; born 1972), Japanese R&B and pop singer
- Kenichi Hirai (平井 健一; born 1950), Japanese tennis player
- Kozaburo Hirai (平井 康三郎; 1910–2002), Japanese composer
- Michiko Hirai (平井 道子; 1935–1984), Japanese actress and voice actress
- Minoru Hirai (平井 稔; 1903–1998), Japanese martial artist
- Momo Hirai (平井 もも; born 1996), K-pop Idol from Twice
- Naohito Hirai (平井 直人; born 1978), Japanese footballer
- Nobukazu Hirai (平井 伸和; born 1969), Japanese professional wrestler
- Hirai Seijirō (平井 晴二郎; 1856–1926), Japanese railroad engineer
- Rio Hirai (平井 理央; born 1982), Japanese TV actress and announcer
- Shinji Hirai (平井 伸治; born 1961), Japanese politician
- Shoki Hirai (平井 将生; born 1987), Japanese footballer
- Takuya Hirai (平井 卓也; born 1958), Japanese politician
- Tarō Hirai (平井 太郎; 1894–1965), Japanese author, better known by the pen name Edogawa Ranpo (江戸川 乱歩)
- Terushichi Hirai (平井 輝七; 1900–1970), Japanese photographer
- Yanosuke Hirai (平井 弥之助; 1902–1986), Japanese civil engineer and corporate executive
- Yasunari Hirai (平井 康翔; born 1990), Japanese swimmer
