= Ryōhei Kimura =

Japanese voice actor (born 1984)

- 木村 良平
- Born: July 30, 1984 (age 42); Tokyo, Japan
- Occupations: Actor; voice actor; singer
- Years active: 1987–present
- Agent: Himawari Theatre Group
- Height: 170 cm (5 ft 7 in)

YouTube information
- Channel: 良平は酒飲みながらゲームしたい。
- Years active: 2020 - present

Ryōhei Kimura (木村 良平, Kimura Ryōhei; born July 30, 1984) is a Japanese actor and singer. His roles include Eichi Sakurai in Full Moon o Sagashite, Roche in Neo Angelique ~Abyss~ series, Akira Takizawa in Eden of the East, Hinata from Angel Beats!, Shouma Takakura in Mawaru Penguindrum, Kodaka Hasegawa in Boku wa Tomodachi ga Sukunai, Chihiro Furuya in Sankarea, Ryouta Kise in the Kuroko no Basket series, Kaito Yashio in Robotics;Notes, Touji Ato in Tokyo Ravens, Bokuto Koutarou in Haikyū!!, Sorey in Tales of Zestiria, Joshua Kiryu in The World Ends with You series, and Kashimo Hajime in Jujutsu Kaisen. He won the Best Supporting Actor Award at the 6th Seiyu Awards. He is affiliated with Himawari Theatre Group.

== Filmography ==
=== Anime series ===
YEAR	SERIES	ROLE	NOTES	SOURCE
1999	Medabots	Belmont		
2002	Full Moon o Sagashite	Eichi Sakurai		
2005	Sugar Sugar Rune	Houx		
2007	Big Windup!	Shintaro Nishihiro		
2007	Kekkaishi	Kagemiya Sen		
2008	Natsume's Book of Friends	Satoru Nishimura		
2008	Neo Angelique Abyss	Roche		
2008	Shigofumi: Letters from the Departed	Daiki Senkawa	Ep. 3	
2009	Eden of the East	Akira Takizawa		
2009	Zoku Natsume Yūjinchō	Satoru Nishimura		
2010	Big Windup!	Shintaro Nishihiro		
2010	Heroman	Psy		
2010	Star Driver: Kagayaki no Takuto	Ryuu Ginta/Camel Star		
2010	Yu-Gi-Oh! 5D's	Brave		
2010	Angel Beats!	Hideki Hinata		
2011	C: The Money of Soul and Possibility Control	Kakuta		
2011	Gosick	Young Albert de Blois	Ep. 15	
2011	Haganai	Kodaka Hasegawa		
2011	Hanasaku Iroha	Hiwatari Yousuke		
2011	Kamisama Dolls	Aki Kuga		
2011	Kimi to Boku	Asaba Yuuki		
2011	Natsume Yūjinchō San	Nishimura Satoru		
2011	Penguindrum	Shoma Takakura		
2011	Un-Go	Yasutarou Mihara	Ep. 9	
2012	Beyblade: Shogun Steel	Genjuro Kamegaki		
2012	Kamisama Hajimemashita	Kotaro Urashima		
2012	Kimi to Boku 2	Yuki Asaba		
2012	Kuroko's Basketball	Ryouta Kise		
2012	Magi: The Labyrinth of Magic	Judar		
2012	Natsume Yūjinchō Shi	Satoru Nishimura		
2012	Robotics;Notes	Kaito Yashio		
2012	Sakamichi no Apollon	Kaoru Nishimi		
2012	Sankarea: Undying Love	Chihiro Furuya		
2012	The Ambition of Oda Nobuna	Yoshikage Asakura		
2012	Yu-Gi-Oh! Zexal Special	Taiki Kimura		
2013	Arata: The Legend	Masato Kadowaki		
2013	Blood Lad	Braz D. Blood		
2013	Haganai Next	Kodaka Hasegawa		
2013	Jewelpet Happiness	Takumi Asano		
2013	Kuroko's Basketball 2nd Season	Ryouta Kise		
2013	Magi: The Kingdom of Magic	Judar		
2013	Meganebu!	Hayato Kimata		
2013	Psycho-Pass	Ryogo Kozuki		
2013	RDG Red Data Girl	Masumi Sōda		
2013	Saiyuki Gaiden	Rikuo		
2013	Silver Spoon	Yugo Hachiken		
2013	Sunday Without God	Lion-masked teenager	Eps. 5-6	
2013	Tokyo Ravens	Touji Ato		
2013	Valvrave the Liberator	L-Elf Karlstein		
2014	Akame ga Kill!	Syura		
2014	BeyWarriors: BeyRaiderz	Leon Fierce		
2014	Bonjour♪Sweet Love Patisserie	Gilbert Hanafusa		
2014	Buddy Complex	Tusais Framboise		
2014	Monthly Girls' Nozaki-kun	Hirotaka Wakamatsu		
2014	Kuroshitsuji: Book of Circus	Charles Grey		
2014	Lord Marksman and Vanadis	Zion Thenardier		
2014	Love Stage	Takahiro Kuroi		
2014	The Seven Deadly Sins	Howzer		
2014	Nobunaga Concerto	Azai Nagamasa		
2014	Psycho-Pass 2	Kirito Kamui		
2014	Silver Spoon 2nd season	Yugo Hachiken		
2014	Space Dandy	Gentle	Eps. 18-19	
2014	The Irregular at Magic High School	Gyobu Hattori		
2014	Hybrid Child	Ichi Seya		
2015	Aoharu x Machinegun	Takatora Fujimoto		
2015	Ace of Diamond Second Season	Kōsei Amahisa		
2015	Castle Town Dandelion	Shū Sakurada		
2015	Chaos Dragon	Sol		
2015	Charlotte	Arifumi Fukuyama	Ep. 4	
2015	Diabolik Lovers More Blood	Kou Mukami		
2015	Fafner in the Azure: Exodus	Misao Kurusu		
2015	Haikyū!! 2	Kōtaro Bokuto		
2015	Kamisama Hajimemashita◎	Kotaro Urashima		
2015	Kuroko's Basketball 3rd Season	Ryouta Kise		
2015	Q Transformers: Return of the Mystery of Convoy	Bumblebee		
2015	Kyoukai no Rinne	Tsubasa Jūmonji		
2015	Tales of Zestiria: Doshi no Yoake	Sorey		
2015	Uta no Prince-sama: Maji Love Revolutions	Hyūga Yamato		
2016	Battery	Shunji Mizugaki		
2016	Haruchika: Haruta & Chika	Tōru Asagiri		
2016	Joker Game	Kaminaga		
2016	Kuromukuro	Tom Borden		
2016	Kyoukai no Rinne Season 2	Tsubasa Jūmonji		
2016	Macross Delta	Harry Takasugi, Keith Aero Windermere		
2016	Prince of Stride: Alternative	Riku Yagami		
2016	ReLIFE	Ryō Yoake		
2016	Servamp	Lawless		
2016	Shōwa Genroku Rakugo Shinjū	Pūta		
2016	Tales of Zestiria the X	Sorey		
2016	Tōken Ranbu: Hanamaru	Izuminokami Kanesada		
2016	Tsukiuta. The Animation	Shun Shimotsuki		
2016	Uta no Prince-sama Maji LOVE Legend Star	Hyūga Yamato		
2017	Chō Shōnen Tantei-dan NEO	Kobayashi		
2017	Tales of Zestiria the X Season 2	Sorey		
2017	Kyoukai no Rinne Season 3	Tsubasa Jūmonji		
2017	Katsugeki/Touken Ranbu	Izuminokami Kanesada		
2017	Dive!!	Hiroya Sakai		
2017	Boruto: Naruto Next Generations	Shizuma Hoshigaki		
2017	Dynamic Chord	Tsumugi Momose		
2017	Our Love Has Always Been 10 Centimeters Apart	Chiaki Serizawa		
2018	The Seven Deadly Sins: Revival of the Commandments	Howzer		
2018	Devils' Line	Hans Lee		
2018	Junji Ito Collection	Yuji, Hiroshi Sakaguchi, Yoshiyuki, Kiyoshi Kitagawa, Yasumin, Yamamoto		
2018	Nil Admirari no Tenbin: Teito Genwaku Kitan	Shougo Ukai		
2018	Tokyo Ghoul:re	Taishi Fura		
2018	Touken Ranbu: Hanamaru 2	Izuminokami Kanesada		
2018	Free! Dive to the Future	Hiyori Tono		
2018	Grand Blue	Kohei Imamura		
2018	Holmes at Kyoto Teramachi Sanjō	Akihito Kajiwara		
2018	Isekai Izakaya "Nobu"	Jean-Francois Mount de Lavigni		
2018	Zombie Land Saga	Inubashi		
2018	Radiant	Piodan		
2019	Ace of Diamond Act II	Kōsei Amahisa		
2019	Demon Slayer: Kimetsu no Yaiba	Swamp Demon		
2019	Kochoki: Wakaki Nobunaga	Sakuma Nobumori		
2019	Welcome to Demon School! Iruma-kun	Alice Asmodeus		
2019	Phantasy Star Online 2: Episode Oracle	Zeno		
2020	Smile Down the Runway	Toh Ayano		
2020	Haikyū!! To The Top	Kōtaro Bokuto		
2020	A Destructive God Sits Next to Me	Utsugi Tsukimiya		
2020	Dorohedoro	Jonson		
2020	Gibiate	Katsunori Hamuro		
2020	The Misfit of Demon King Academy	Ledriano Kanon Azeschen		
2020	Yashahime	Kohaku		
2020	Ikebukuro West Gate Park	Saru		
2020	Tsukiuta. The Animation 2	Shun Shimotsuki		
2020	The Day I Became a God	Ashura Kokuhō		
2021	I-Chu: Halfway Through the Idol	Aoi Kakitsubata		
2021	Koikimo	Masuda		
2021	Odd Taxi	Gо̄riki		
2021	The World Ends with You the Animation	Yoshiya "Joshua" Kiryu		
2021	Welcome to Demon School! Iruma-kun Season 2	Alice Asmodeus		
2021	Life Lessons with Uramichi Oniisan	Hanabee Kikaku		
2021	Restaurant to Another World 2	Thomas		
2022	Kaginado Season 2	Hideki Hinata		
2022	A Couple of Cuckoos	Yōhei Umino		
2022	The Rising of the Shield Hero 2	Kyo Ethnina		
2022	Bibliophile Princess	Christopher Selkirk Ashelard		
2022	Welcome to Demon School! Iruma-kun Season 3	Alice Asmodeus		
2023	Handyman Saitou in Another World	Saitou		
2023	Hell's Paradise: Jigokuraku	Chōbei Aza		
2023	Skip and Loafer	Narumi Kanechika		
2023	The Girl I Like Forgot Her Glasses	Ren Azuma		
2023	My Happy Marriage	Arata Tsuruki		
2023	Protocol: Rain	Akito Sendō		
2023	The Family Circumstances of the Irregular Witch	Torino		
2024	Sengoku Youko	Shinsuke		
2024	A Condition Called Love	Sōhei Yao		
2024	Shinmai Ossan Bōkensha, Saikyō Party ni Shinu Hodo Kitaerarete Muteki ni Naru	Raster Diarmuit		
2024	Haigakura	Hiki		
2024	A Terrified Teacher at Ghoul School!	Isaburō Ebisu		
2024	Let This Grieving Soul Retire!	Sven		
2024	Delico's Nursery	Angelico Fra (Adolescent)		
2025	Blue Miburo	Yaksha		
2025	Onmyo Kaiten Re:Birth Verse	Abe no Seimei		
2025	Betrothed to My Sister's Ex	Louisphon		
2025	Secrets of the Silent Witch	Elliott Howard		
2025	Tougen Anki	Kyoya Oiranzaka		
2025	Scooped Up by an S-Rank Adventurer!	Allen		
2025	Pass the Monster Meat, Milady!	Maxim du Livastal Mild Langtias		
2026	There Was a Cute Girl in the Hero's Party, So I Tried Confessing to Her	Yūga		
2026	Jujutsu Kaisen	Hajime Kashimo		
2027	Welcome to Demon School! Iruma-kun: IruMafia Edition	Alice Asmodeus		
2027	Inherit the Winds	Nagakura Shinpachi		
2027	The Remarried Empress	Heinrey		

=== Original video animation (OVA) ===
- Kono Danshi Uchuujin to Tatakaemasu (2011) as Kakashi
- Nagareboshi Lens (2012) as Yūdai
- Arata-naru Sekai (2012) as Kirishima
- Yondemasuyo, Azazel-san (2014) as Osamu Koyamauchi
- Hybrid Child (2014) as Ichi Seya
- Kuroshitsuji: Book of Murder (2014) as Charles Grey
- Tokyo Ghoul: JACK (2015) as Taishi Fura
- Kuroko's Basketball: Saikou no Present Desu (2015) as Ryōta Kise
- Trick or Alice (2016) as Ren Kisaragi
- My Hero Academia (2017) as Romero Fujimi

=== Drama CD ===
- Last Game as Naoto Yanagi
- Dear Vocalist as A'
- Ikemen Vampire as Arthur Conan Doyle
- TOKYO COLOR SONIC!! as Mirai Zaizen

=== Original net animation (ONA) ===
- Mobile Suit Gundam Thunderbolt (2015) as Daryl Lorenz
- Ultraman (2019) as Shinjiro Hayata
- Junji Ito Maniac: Japanese Tales of the Macabre (2023) as Tsuyoshi Yoshikawa
- Good Night World (2023) as Leon
- Onimusha (2023) as Iemon

=== Anime films ===
- Cencoroll (2009) as Shū
- Eden of the East Compilation: Air Communication (2009) as Akira Takizawa
- Eden of the East the Movie I: The King of Eden (2009) as Akira Takizawa
- Eden of the East the Movie II: Paradise Lost (2010) as Akira Takizawa
- Fafner in the Azure: Heaven and Earth (2010) as Misao Kurusu
- Fullmetal Alchemist: The Sacred Star of Milos (2011) as Ashley Crichton (young)
- Inazuma Eleven Go vs Danball Senki W (2012) as Asta
- Nerawareta Gakuen (2012) as Yū Jinno
- Aura: Koga Maryuin's Last War (2013) as Yuuta Takahashi
- Black Butler: Book of the Atlantic (2017) as Charles Grey
- Kuroko's Basketball The Movie: Last Game (2017) as Ryouta Kise
- Free! Take Your Marks (2017) as Hiyori Tono
- Yo-kai Watch Shadowside: Oni-ō no Fukkatsu (2017) as Lord Enma
- Servamp -Alice in the Garden- (2018) as Lawless
- My Hero Academia: Two Heroes (2018) as David Shield (teenage version)
- Natsume's Book of Friends Movie (2018) as Satoru Nishimura
- Yo-kai Watch: Forever Friends (2018) as Itsuki Takashiro
- Cencoroll Connect (2019) as Shū
- Weathering with You (2019) as Kimura
- Free! The Final Stroke Part 1 (2021) as Hiyori Tono
- Free! The Final Stroke Part 2 (2022) as Hiyori Tono
- Odd Taxi: In the Woods (2022) as Gо̄riki
- Re:cycle of Penguindrum (2022) as Shōma Takakura
- Gekijōban Collar × Malice Deep Cover (2023) as Kageyuki Shiraishi

=== Video games ===
2005

- Nana as Shinichi Okazaki (PS2 version)

2007

- Big Windup! as Shintarou Nishihiro
- Elsword as Add
- The World Ends with You as Yoshiya "Joshua" Kiryu

2008

- Neo Angelique Abyss as Roche

2010

- The 3rd Birthday as Dr. Blank
- Otome Desk (乙女デスク) as Minai Hidenori

2011

- Inazuma Eleven Strikers as Asta
- Yu-Gi-Oh! 5D's Tag Force 6 as Brave
- Gakuen Tokkyuu Hotokenser as Dōjima Mitsuki/Hotoken Green
- Kirameki! Nekketsu Rabu (きらめき！熱血-ラ部) as Kazamatsuri Hayato

2012

- Custom Drive as Kannagi Shion
- Diabolik Lovers as Mukami Kou
- Haganai Portable as Kodaka Hasegawa
- Kingdom Hearts: Dream Drop Distance as Yoshiya "Joshua" Kiryu
- Kuroko no Basuke: Kiseki no Game as Ryouta Kise
- Phantasy Star Online 2 as Zeno and Persona
- Pokémon as Cheren (Black 2 White 2 Animated Trailer)
- Renai Bancho 2 Midnight Lesson! as Data Bancho
- Robotics;Notes as Kaito Yashio
- Under Night In-Birth as Hyde Kido
- Boku Wa Tomodachi Ga Sukunai Portable as Hasegawa Kodaka

2013

- SNOW BOUND LAND as Kai
- London Detective Mysteria as William.H.Watson/Watson Jr (PSP version)
- Super Robot Wars UX as Misao Kurusu, Simon "Psy" Kaina
- The Wonderful 101 as Wonder-Red, Arthur Wedgewood
- Koibana Days as Kikunosuke Takaoka

2014

- Lost Dimension as Touya Orbert
- Infamous Second Son as Eugene
- Ayakashi Koi Gikyoku as Kasumi

2015

- Dragon Ball Xenoverse as Time Patroller (Male 8)
- Tales of Zestiria as Sorey
- Touken Ranbu as Izuminokami Kanesada
- Tokyo Mirage Sessions ♯FE as Itsuki Aoi
- Angel Beats! -1st beat- as Hinata

2016

- I-Chu as Aoi Kakitsubata
- Dragon Ball Xenoverse 2 as Time Patroller (Male 8)
- Mobile Legends: Bang Bang as Hanzo (Android/iOS)
- Collar × Malice Kageyuki Shiraishi
- Fate/Extella Link as Charlemagne
- Icchibanketsu -ONLINE as Saizou
- Yo-kai Watch 3 as Lord Enma

2017

- Akane-sasu Sekai de Kimi to Utau as Maeda Keiji
- Danganronpa V3: Killing Harmony as Kaito Momota
- Diabolik Lovers LOST EDEN as Mukami Kou
- Tales of the Rays as Sorey

2018

- BlazBlue: Cross Tag Battle as Hyde Kido
- Fate/Extella Link as Saber / Charlemagne
- Food Fantasy as Sweet Tofu
- Seven Deadly Sins: Britannia no Tabibito as Hauser
- Piofiore no Banshō as Nicola Francesca

2019

- Op8 as Yuduki Kanato
- Robotics;Notes DaSH as Yashio Kaito
- Days Gone as James O'Brian
- Daemon X Machina as Artist
- Hoshinari Echoes as Shirogane Subaru
- Inazuma Eleven: Balance Of Ares as Michinari Tatsumi
- Kaikan Phrase CLIMAX -NEXT GENERATION as Kiryuu Takuya
- DIABOLIK LOVERS CHAOS LINEAGE as Kou
- Tokyo Chronos as Lowe
- Ikémen Vampire as Arthur Conan Doyle
- Another Eden as Shigure
- Saint Seiya Awakening as Unicorn Jabu

2020

- Sangokushi Hadou as Zhuge Liang
- Pokémon Masters as Kiriya (Paulo)
- Fire Emblem Heroes as Julian
- Genshin Impact as Tartaglia
- Lord of Heroes as Joshua Levinth

2021

- Buddy Mission Bond as Luke
- Demon Slayer: Kimetsu no Yaiba – The Hinokami Chronicles as Swamp Demon
- Loopers as Simon
- Neo: The World Ends with You as Yoshiya "Joshua" Kiryu
- Super Robot Wars 30 as Shinjiro Hayata

2022

- Xenoblade Chronicles 3 as Taion
- The DioField Chronicle as Zevatian Schugel
- Stella of the End as Jude Gray
- God of War Ragnarök as Heimdall
- Fate/Grand Order as Charlemagne
- Fire Emblem Engage as Alfred

2024

- UNDER NIGHT IN-BIRTH II Sys:Celes as Hyde

=== Dubbing ===
==== Live-action ====
- The 5th Wave (Ben Parish (Nick Robinson))
- The 100 (Jasper Jordan (Devon Bostick))
- Babel (Ahmed (Said Tarchani))
- The Ballad of Buster Scruggs (Harrison (Harry Melling))
- Bumblebee (Bumblebee (Dylan O'Brien))
- The Chronicles of Narnia film series (Peter Pevensie (William Moseley))
- The Client (1997 TV Asahi edition) (Mark Sway (Brad Renfro))
- The Country Bears (Dexter "Dex" Barrington (Eli Marienthal))
- Dark Phoenix (Scott Summers / Cyclops (Tye Sheridan))
- A Dog's Way Home (Lucas Ray (Jonah Hauer-King))
- Dope (Malcolm Adekanbi (Shameik Moore))
- Fargo (Scotty Lundegaard (Tony Denman))
- The Flash (Hartley Rathaway/Pied Piper (Andy Mientus))
- Honey, We Shrunk Ourselves (Adam Szalinski (Bug Hall))
- Ironheart (Parker Robbins / The Hood (Anthony Ramos))
- Jack (Louie Durante (Adam Zolotin))
- Jumanji: Welcome to the Jungle (Spencer Gilpin (Alex Wolff))
- Life of Pi (Pi Patel (Suraj Sharma))
- Medium episode "Sweet Child O' Mine" (Jessie Andrews/Brian (Noel Fisher))
- Old (Trent Cappa (Alex Wolff))
- The Patriot (Thomas Martin (Gregory Smith))
- Percy Jackson: Sea of Monsters (Tyson (Douglas Smith))
- The Revenant (Hawk (Forrest Goodluck))
- Simon Birch (Joe Wenteworth (Joseph Mazzello))
- Smash (Kyle Bishop (Andy Mientus))
- The Three Musketeers (Louis XIII (Freddie Fox))
- The Untamed (trailer only) (Wei Wuxian (Xiao Zhan))
- When the Game Stands Tall (Chris Ryan (Alexander Ludwig))
- X-Men: Apocalypse (Scott Summers / Cyclops (Tye Sheridan))

==== Animation ====
- Kim Possible (Wade Load)
- Mo Dao Zu Shi (Wei Wuxian)
- Transformers One (B-127 / Bumblebee)

== Music video ==
- Innosense by FLOW with Ryōta Ōsaka
