= Rin-ne =

Japanese manga series

- First tankōbon volume cover, featuring Sakura Mamiya (left) and Rinne Rokudo (right)

境界のRINNE (Kyōkai no Rinne)
- Genre: Romantic comedy; Slice of life; Supernatural
- Manga
- Written by: Rumiko Takahashi
- Published by: Shogakukan
- English publisher: AUS: Madman Entertainment; NA: Viz Media
- Imprint: Shōnen Sunday Comics
- Magazine: Weekly Shōnen Sunday
- Original run: April 22, 2009 – December 13, 2017
- Volumes: 40
- Anime television series
- Directed by: Seiki Sugawara (1–50); Hiroshi Ishiodori (51–75)
- Produced by: Yusuke Fujita; Kaori Ito
- Written by: Michiko Yokote
- Music by: Akimitsu Honma
- Studio: Brain's Base
- Licensed by: NA: Sentai Filmworks
- Original network: NHK Educational TV
- English network: US: Anime Network, TV Japan (subtitled)
- Original run: April 4, 2015 – September 23, 2017
- Episodes: 75
- icon

Rin-ne (境界のRINNE, Kyōkai no Rinne; lit. "Rinne of the Boundary", officially subtitled as Circle of Reincarnation) is a Japanese manga series written and illustrated by Rumiko Takahashi. It was serialized in Shogakukan's shōnen manga magazine Weekly Shōnen Sunday from April 2009 to December 2017, with its chapters collected in 40 tankōbon volumes. The series follows Sakura Mamiya, a girl who gained the power to see ghosts after an incident as a child, and her classmate Rinne Rokudo, a boy of mixed human and shinigami heritage who helps lingering spirits finally pass on to be reincarnated.

The manga has been licensed in North America by Viz Media, which simultaneously released the manga chapters online in English as they were serialized in Japan until March 2011, and in Australasia by Madman Entertainment. A three-season anime television series adaptation, produced by Brain's Base, aired from 2015 to 2017. The manga has had 3 million copies in circulation.

== Plot ==
Sakura Mamiya is a high school student who gained the ability to see ghosts after being mysteriously spirited away for one week as a child, though she recalls little about the incident. This ability causes her distress since others cannot perceive the spirits she encounters. At school, she meets Rinne Rōkudo, a frequently absent classmate who works as a shinigami. His role involves helping earthbound spirits resolve their lingering attachments so they can pass through the wheel of reincarnation—a massive red wheel visible in the sky. Their interactions frequently involve assisting these troubled spirits while navigating the challenges caused by Sakura's supernatural perception.

== Characters ==
=== Main characters ===
Rinne Rokudo (六道 りんね, Rokudō Rinne)
Voiced by: Kōki Uchiyama (PV), Kaito Ishikawa (anime)
Rinne Rokudō is a first-year high school student of mixed human and shinigami heritage, distinguished by his red hair. After his human grandfather's death, he moves to the human world despite opposition from his grandmother, Tamako. Due to his father Sabato's theft of his savings, Rinne lives in poverty, residing in an abandoned school clubroom. As a shinigami, his human blood necessitates expensive tools, though he owns only the Haori of the Underworld (黄泉の羽織, Yomi no Haori), a robe rendering him invisible to the living and granting ghosts physical form. Rinne befriends Sakura, whom he deeply cares for, often prioritizing her safety. He clashes with Tsubasa over their differing methods of handling spirits and rivalry for Sakura's attention, finds Ageha's persistent romantic advances exasperating, and resents Sabato for his deceitful nature. Physically, Rinne closely resembles his father.
Sakura Mamiya (真宮 桜, Mamiya Sakura)
Voiced by: Mariya Ise (PV), Marina Inoue (anime)
Sakura Mamiya is a first-year high school student known for her twin braids. As a child, she was spirited away to the ghost world but was rescued by the shinigami Tamako, leaving her with extrasensory perception. Typically calm and reserved, she rarely expresses her emotions, though subtle hints suggest she develops feelings for Rinne. While unaware of Rinne and Tsubasa's affections, she occasionally displays jealousy. She prioritizes helping others and acting justly. Her mother is a homemaker, and her father works at a bank.
Rokumon (六文)
Voiced by: Rie Kugimiya (PV), Hitomi Nabatame (anime)
Rokumon is a black contract cat, a supernatural being that assists shinigami in exorcising evil spirits while also spreading curses and ill omens. He typically appears as a small black cat with a human-like face but can shift into a monstrous form to intimidate humans or a cute kitten to beg for food. Initially, he arrives in the human world as a demonic cat, frightening Rinne and Sakura's classmates. Though claiming Tamako sent him to partner with Rinne, the truth emerges—he was dismissed and seeks Rinne's support. They eventually form a contract, with Rokumon covering his own expenses. He shows no particular fondness for Tsubasa.

=== Family ===
Tamako (魂子, Tamako)
Voiced by: Satsuki Yukino
Tamako is Rinne's paternal grandmother, a shinigami who maintains a youthful appearance and insists on being called "young lady". Fifty years earlier, she fell in love with a dying man and struck a deal with a death priest to extend his life by fifty years in exchange for performing ten times the usual shinigami duties—a burden that would pass to her descendants if she failed. She once rescued Sakura from a Damashigami, inadvertently granting her the ability to see ghosts. After her husband's death, she lost her right to remain in the human world, though she continues supporting Rinne from afar. She owns a black cat named Kuroboshi.
Sabato Rokudo (六道 鯖人, Rokudō Sabato)
Voiced by: Kappei Yamaguchi
Sabato Rokudō is Rinne's father and Tamako's son. As president of the illegal Damashigami Company, he steals souls before their natural lifespan ends—a practice Rinne strongly opposes. During Rinne's childhood, Sabato frequently stole from his son's savings and incurred debts in Rinne's name through forgery. Known for his womanizing ways, he maintains relationships with numerous women while showing particular affection for Ageha's sister, his secretary. Sabato employs underhanded tactics to pressure Rinne into inheriting his business so he can retire. His financial irresponsibility and unethical behavior create constant conflict with his son.
Mrs. Mamiya (宮前)
Voiced by: Fumi Hirano
Mrs. Mamiya is Sakura's mother, a cheerful woman, known to get carried away when cooking and makes/buys too much food. She always stays at home as a housewife while her husband works at a bank, and she is unaware of her daughter's ability to see ghosts. She was a student of Sankai High School like her daughter, and a member of the Broadcasting club with an old friend named Otobe who had a crush on her.
Otome Rokudō (六道 乙女, Rokudō Otome)
Voiced by: Megumi Hayashibara
Otome Rokudō is a high-ranking shinigami who is Rinne's mother. She had been missing for many years because she was accidentally pushed into the Wheel of Reincarnation when she tried to get rid of something, and reincarnated, first into a fish, then a canary, then anteater before becoming an elementary school girl named Ichigo.

=== Humans ===
Miho (ミホ)
Voiced by: Sora Tokui
Miho serves as student council secretary and is friends with Sakura and Rika. Despite her fascination with horror stories, she scares easily like Rika.
Rika (リカ)
Voiced by: Aya Suzaki
Rika is Sakura and Miho's superstitious friend. At some occasions, she finds herself mixed up in a haunting through no fault of her own. Her first brush with the occult comes when she inherited a haunted phone number that has been floating around for many years. Her last name is revealed in the anime to be Momoi (桃井).
Tsubasa Jumonji (十文字 翼, Jūmonji Tsubasa)
Voiced by: Ryōhei Kimura
Tsubasa Jumonji comes from a family of exorcists. Like Sakura, he can also see ghosts, but often brutally attacks them with "sacred ashes" instead of trying to put them to rest, which can serve to turn them into evil spirits. He initially met Sakura when they were in younger and he began to harbor feelings for her after he realized that she can see ghosts as well. Since his transfer into Sakura's high school, he has tried countless times for Sakura to return his affection and is jealous of the time she and Rinne have spent together, and thus begins joining them on their ghost exploits. Since joining them, he has realized that not all ghosts are evil and has been more lenient towards some. He tends to jump to conclusions, especially when something concerns Rinne and Sakura's relationship. It is hinted that he is Christian.
Ayame Sakaki (榊 あやめ, Sakaki Ayame)
Ayame Sakaki works at a local shrine and appears timid, though she harbors a powerful vengeful spirit beyond her control. She first noticed Tsubasa when they attended middle school together, but he transferred before she could approach him. Upon reuniting, Tsubasa agrees to date her to contain her spirit, though he remains preoccupied with Sakura. Unable to fully control her supernatural manifestation, Ayame's spirit frequently escapes, requiring repeated interventions. Tsubasa avoids being alone with her, often including Rinne and Sakura in their meetings. She continues hoping for another date with Tsubasa despite his reluctance.
Hitomi Annette Anematsuri (姉祭・アネット・瞳, Anematsuri Anetto Hitomi)
Voiced by: Miyuki Sawashiro
Hitomi Annette Anematsuri works as a homeroom assistant teacher while possessing the Peep Ball, a valuable shinigami tool that reveals glimpses of people's past or future. Multiple parties, including Sabato, Kain and Masato, attempt to steal it, but her accurate predictions and Rinne's assistance help her retain it. Descended from a French witch, her grandmother married a Japanese tourist and relocated to Japan. Both her grandmother and mother frequently visit hot springs, leaving her alone. When home, her grandmother disciplines her by striking her head for mistakes.

=== Non-humans ===
Masato (魔狭人)
Voiced by: Tetsuya Kakihara
Masato is a wealthy devil who holds a grudge against Rinne stemming from their childhood at Demon Elementary School. When assigned to collect a dying rabbit's soul, Rinne revived the animal by feeding it, ruining Masato's task. Their rivalry began after Masato attacked with a pitchfork and Rinne retaliated with a crucifix. Though he uses his fortune to gain advantage over Rinne, Masato's plans often fail due to his poor judgment and spelling errors. His elaborate traps tend to be transparent and frequently backfire. Despite his resources, these shortcomings make him an ineffective opponent.
Ageha (鳳)
Voiced by: Rie Murakawa
Ageha is a shinigami from an affluent family who initially investigates the Damashigami company. After meeting Rinne, she develops romantic feelings for him, though she continues hunting rogue spirits. Her sister's affiliation with Sabato's organization troubles her, particularly when others mention it. Ageha persistently pursues Rinne while growing jealous of Sakura, whom she views as a rival. Her overenthusiasm frequently causes conflicts, including with the more practical Renge, a childhood acquaintance. Ageha owns a black cat named Oboro and reacts strongly to criticism about her family's reputation.
Bijin (美人)
Voiced by: Izumi Kitta
Bijin is Ageha's older sister and secretary of the Damashigami Company. A year before the series starts, she worked as a shinigami like her younger sister, vowing to bring down the Damashigami Company. Then, she disappears and sends her sister a postcard, saying that she now has a boyfriend, Sabato Rokudo. Even though he is a ladies' man, she seems to be his favorite. After Ageha uncovers her work as a Damashigami, their relationship becomes more strained because Bijin decides to stay at Sabato's side while leaving Ageha feeling hurt and betrayed by her sister.
Kain (架印)
Voiced by: Sōma Saitō
Kain is a shirushigami (記死神), an underworld accountant who monitors human lifespans. His mother's financial support of Sabato Rokudō—who borrowed heavily from her—left them impoverished while funding Sabato's illegal Damashigami operations. To protect his family's reputation, Kain secretly hunts rogue spirits, resenting Rinne due to Sabato's fraudulent use of Rinne's seal on loan contracts. Initially ruthless, he disregards collateral damage, even endangering Sakura to reclaim debts. Though he views Rinne as complicit, they occasionally ally against Sabato. Unaware his middle school classmate Renge works for the Damashigami Company, he encourages her ambitions, hoping she attends Shinigami Elite High School. He owns a black cat named Suzu.
Shoma (翔真, Shōma)
Voiced by: Yūko Sanpei
Shoma is a shinigami grade schooler from a wealthy family. At his first appearance, he paired with Rinne who is supposed to serve as a mentor during their training. He even lives with Rinne for the assignment. However due to Rinne's poverty, he looks down on him, complaining all the while and ignoring Rinne's advice. He is a bit of a glory hound and overestimates his abilities, despite being very inexperienced and even behind his classmates in his achievements. Thus, he takes on too big a task and causes more problems for spirits and his mentor than he actually solves. Furthermore, he is shown to be easily bored and cheeky, e.g. painting his black cat. Later, he meets Ichigo and falls in love with her, unaware that she is the reincarnation of Rinne's mother. He has a black cat named Kurosu.
Refuto (零不兎)
Voiced by: Katsuyuki Konishi
Refuto is the fourth generation master of the Crescent Moon Shop (三日月堂, Mikazukido), which has been in business for 4,000 years in scythe sharpening, and the youngest twin of Raito. Because of his inexperience and bad mouth, the shop has fallen on hard times, both he and his twin sister are desperate for customers, and rely on Rinne's help, but their new products mostly end discontinued and their business sometimes end in suspension.
Raito (来兎)
Voiced by: Shizuka Itō
Raito is the business manager of the Crescent Moon Shop, and the eldest twin of Refuto. She lured Rinne to the store and convinced him to let her brother sharp his Scythe in hope of increasing their reputation and keeping their business going. She and Refuto would still try to come up with ways to make their business thrive, and would still make contact with Rinne to either sell him or ask him to try new products. Though she means well, she is shrewd, going as far as tricking and forcing Rinne to do something for their profit; and seizing any profitable opportunity.
Renge Shima (四魔 れんげ, Shima Renge)
Voiced by: Shizuka Ishigami
Renge Shima is a transfer student and Damashigami who initially targets male students using a Marilyn Monroe spirit. After explaining to Sakura how her seductive methods alienated potential female friends, she reveals her backstory—Sabato caused her to miss the Shinigami Elite High School entrance exam when he knocked her into the Sanzu River while fleeing a restaurant. Now attending Damashigami High School for Girls, she begrudgingly works for Sabato to escape poverty while maintaining a bitter rivalry with Ageha dating to their school days. Renge harbors unrequited feelings for Kain, desperately hiding her Damashigami activities from him. She frequently clashes with Rinne, her new neighbor in the abandoned clubhouse, and owns an elderly black cat named Tama.
Matsugo (沫悟)
Voiced by: Taishi Murata
Matsugo is Rinne's former elementary school classmate from an affluent family, now attending Shinigami Elite High School. At their reunion, he initially resents Rinne for allegedly nearly drowning him during a field trip, but upon learning Rinne actually saved him from embarrassment, his hostility turns into intense admiration. Though he denies romantic feelings, his persistent attempts to spend time with Rinne—mirroring Ageha's tactics—create similar annoyance. This shared infatuation with Rinne fuels their mutual dislike. Like Ageha, he employs exaggerated methods to gain Rinne's attention, much to Rinne's frustration. His contracted black cat is named Kuromitsu.
Anju (杏珠)
Voiced by: Rie Kugimiya
Anju is Matsugo's classmate and attends the Shinigami Elite High School. She has a big crush on Matsugo but is way too shy to talk to him, and sadly for her, Matsugo is indifferent to her. She does not have a black cat.

=== Black cats ===
Oboro (朧)
Voiced by: Yoshitsugu Matsuoka
Oboro is Ageha's contracted black cat, continuing his family's tradition of serving hers despite mutual resentment. Their antagonistic relationship stems from childhood mistreatment, including Ageha trapping him under a boulder for a year during their first mission. Though Oboro attempted revenge, Ageha maintains their binding contract, keeping him as her retainer out of spite. Their constant bickering persists throughout the story, though they gradually develop a begrudging tolerance for each other. The contract ensures their forced partnership continues regardless of their personal animosity.
Suzu (鈴)
Voiced by: Suzuko Mimori
Suzu is Kain's black cat. One day while in town, Kain came across her, holding a sign that she was up for adoption for a free price. Due to his family's financial status, Kain took her in. Suzu is very loyal to her master despite having a surly attitude towards others. She looks down on Rinne and Rokumon for being poor, despite hers and Kain's own impoverished state. Still, she is hinted to develop a friendship of sorts with Oboro and Rokumon. Her personality is fairly easy-going though somewhat excitable due to her young age. Additionally, she is never full as she is shown to eat a lot on various occasions. Suzu is doted on by Kain's mother.
Kurosu (黒洲)
Voiced by: Akira Ishida
Kurosu is Shouma's black cat who strictly maintains nine-to-five working hours, refusing overtime due to his dislike of children. Despite this, he patiently supports Shouma during work hours, often handling most tasks himself. As a high-ranking contract cat, he possesses advanced illusory magic abilities. Kurosu recognizes potential in Rokumon, praising his performance on tests. His professional yet limited approach contrasts with other black cats' more dedicated service.
Tama (タマ)
Voiced by: Reiko Suzuki
Tama is Renge's black cat.
Kuromitsu (黒蜜)
Voiced by: Yumi Uchiyama
Kuromitsu is Matsugo's black cat. She is very loyal to her master, supporting him in his numerous attempts to be alone with Rinne and "deepen their friendship".
Kuroboshi (黒星)
Voiced by: Tomomichi Nishimura
Kuroboshi is Tamako's black cat. After being stuck in her master's closet for a time when she had to move back to the otherworld after her husband's time came, he wishes to retire and have his grandson take his place.
Kuroboshi III (黒星三世, Kuroboshi Sansei)
Voiced by: Emiri Katō
Kuroboshi III is the grandson of Tamako's black cat, aspiring to inherit his grandfather's role. However, his severe ghost phobia prevents him from forming a shinigami contract. He must overcome this fear before he can officially serve.

== Media ==
=== Manga ===
Written and illustrated by Rumiko Takahashi, Rin-ne was serialized in Shogakukan's Weekly Shōnen Sunday manga magazine from April 22, 2009, to December 13, 2017. Shogakukan collected its chapters in 40 tankōbon volumes, released from October 16, 2009, to January 18, 2018.

In North America, the manga has been licensed by Viz Media, and they published the chapters simultaneously online in English as they were serialized until March 17, 2011. Rin-ne was the first title to be released under Viz Media's Shonen Sunday imprint, with the first volume published on October 20, 2009, and the last on July 13, 2021. Madman Entertainment published the first volume in Australia on October 10, 2010.

=== Anime ===
A 25-episode anime television series adaptation, produced by Brain's Base and directed by Seiki Sugawara, premiered on April 4, 2015. The screenplay is written by Michiko Yokote and the music composed by Akimitsu Honma. The first set of opening and ending theme songs is "Ōkaranman" (桜花爛漫) by Keytalk and "Tokinowa" (トキノワ) by Passepied respectively, while the second set used from episode 14 onwards is "Ura no Ura" (裏の裏; "Back of the Back") by Passepied and "Futatsu no Sekai" (ふたつの世界; "Two Worlds") by Quruli. Prior to the anime, an animated commercial promoting the manga and Weekly Shōnen Sunday was created in 2009. The second season premiered on April 9, 2016. For the second season, the first set of opening and ending theme songs is "Melody" by Pile and "Hanashi o Shiyō" (話をしよう; "Let's Talk") by Glim Spanky respectively, while the second set used from episode 38 onwards is "Ainii" (アイニー) by CreepHyp and "Beautiful Life" by Shiggy Jr. The third season aired from April to September 2017. For the third season, the first set of opening and ending theme songs is "Shiny" by Yoru no Honki Dance and "Suki nano Kana" (スキナノカナ; "I wonder if I like you") by Softly respectively, while the second set used from episode 63 onwards is "Setsuna Yumemishi" (セツナユメミシ; "A Moment's Dream") by Keytalk and "Puzzle" by Mone Kamishiraishi.

The anime's three seasons are licensed by Sentai Filmworks for digital and home video release in North America.

== Reception ==
By August 2014, Rin-ne had 3 million copies in circulation. During the week of October 12–18, 2009, the first two volumes ranked at No. 15 and 16 for the best-selling manga; combined, the volumes sold about 100,000 copies that week. The following week of October 19–25, 2009, the first volume ranked at No. 18 with over 44,000 copies sold, while the second volume ranked at No. 20 with over 41,000 copies sold. The third manga volume ranked at No. 11 for the best-selling manga for the week of March 15–21, 2010, and the English version ranked at No. 8 on The New York Times Manga Best Seller list in May 2010. The fourth manga volume ranked twice at No. 19 and 20 in June 2010 with over 76,000 copies sold. The fifth manga volume also ranked twice at No. 21 and 23 in September 2010 with over 71,000 copies sold. The sixth manga volume ranked at No. 29 for the best-selling manga for the week of December 13–19, 2010. A 2019 NHK poll of 210,061 people who saw Rin-ne named it Takahashi's sixth best animated work.
