= Dynamic Chord =

Video game and anime series

- Video game
- Developer: Honeybee Black
- Publisher: Honeybee Black
- Platform: Windows
- Released: December 26, 2014 (rêve parfait); March 27, 2015 (Liar-S); June 26, 2016 (Kyohso); November 4, 2016 (apple-polisher)
- Video game

Dynamic Chord V Edition
- Platform: PlayStation Vita
- Released: September 29, 2016 (rêve parfait); December 22, 2016 (Liar-S); March 30, 2017 (Kyohso); July 28, 2018 (apple-polisher)
- Anime television series
- Directed by: Shigenori Kageyama
- Written by: Shigenori Kageyama
- Music by: Shū Kanematsu
- Studio: Pierrot
- Licensed by: NA: Sentai Filmworks
- Original network: TBS, CBC, BS-TBS
- Original run: October 5, 2017 – December 22, 2017
- Episodes: 12

Dynamic Chord (stylized as DYNAMIC CHORD) is a Japanese otome musical-themed visual novel game series developed and published by Honeybee Black. The games follow the musical careers and personal lives of several bands under the "Dynamic Chord" agency and music label. Each games feature different protagonist who develops a love story with the band members. An anime adaptation by Studio Pierrot premiered on October 5, 2017.

== Characters ==
=== Protagonists ===
Rio Atano (上遠野 理緒, Atano Rio)
Niina Futami (双海 仁菜, Futami Niina)
Konoha Kirishita (霧下 このは, Kirishita Konoha)
Miu Hiiragi (柊 美羽, Hiiragi Miu)

=== rêve parfait ===
Reon Kashii (香椎 玲音, Kashii Reon) / King
Voiced by: Takuya Eguchi
Tsumugi Momose (百瀬 つむぎ, Momose Tsumugi) / Bishop
Voiced by: Ryohei Kimura
Kuon Tsukinohara (月野原 久遠, Tsukinohara Kuon) / Rook
Voiced by: Kōsuke Toriumi
Aki Kashii (香椎 亜貴, Kashii Aki) / Knight
Voiced by: Yūya Hirose

=== Liar-S ===
Sakura Hinoyama (檜山 朔良, Hiyama Sakura)
Voiced by: Takuma Terashima
Chiya Suzuno (珠洲乃 千哉, Suzuno Chiya)
Voiced by: Nobuhiko Okamoto
Seri Yuisaki (結崎 芹, Yuisaki Seri)
Voiced by: Tetsuya Kakihara
Sōtarō Haruna (榛名 宗太郎)
Voiced by: Sōma Saitō

=== KYOHSO ===
Yoruto Kisaka (城坂依都, Kisaka Yoruto) / YORITO
Voiced by: Showtaro Morikubo
Tokiharu Hanabusa (英時明, Hanabusa Tokuharu) / TOKIHARU
Voiced by: Shinnosuke Tachibana
Yu Kuroya (黒谷優, Kuroya Yu) / YUU
Voiced by: Kaito Ishikawa
Shinomune Sumiya (諏宮篠宗, Sumiya Shinomune) / SHINOMUNE
Voiced by: Taku Yashiro

=== apple-polisher ===
Narumi Amagi (天城成海, Amagi Narumi) / NaL
Voiced by: Shouta Aoi
Yusei Otoishi (音石夕星, Otoishi Yusei) / Toi
Voiced by: Takahiro Sakurai
Yuki Aoi (青井有紀, Aoi Yuki) / UK
Voiced by: Yoshiki Nakajima
Shinobu Kurosawa (黒沢忍, Kurosawa Shinobu) / Kuro
Voiced by: Yuichiro Umehara

=== Manager ===
Yakumo Igarashi (五十嵐 八雲, Igarashi Yakumo)
Voiced by: Yūsuke Kobayashi
Manami Kaga (加賀真実, Kaga Manami)
Voiced by: Masahisa Kudo
Tatsuo Sagamihara (相模原龍雄, Sagamihara Tatsuo)
Voiced by: Takamasa Mogi
Hisaomi Izumi (伊澄久臣, Izumi Hisaomi)
Voiced by: Masakazu Nishida

=== Anime Exclusive Characters ===
Tatsuya Domyoji (伊澄久臣, Domyoji Tatsuya)
Voiced by: Masaya Matsukaze

== Development and releases ==
Dynamic Chord is an otome visual novel game developed and published by Honeybee Black, an imprint of Honeybee. So far, the project has released 4 Windows games and 3 PlayStation Vita ports. Each band has also released several singles and albums.

== Other media ==
An anime adaptation was first announced via the project's official website. Shigenori Kageyama directs the anime at Studio Pierrot. He's also in charge of series composition and penning the scripts alongside Kyōko Katsuya. Yasuomi Umetsu adapting Ryō Fujiwara's art into animation. Akemi Nagao is in charge of color design while Hiromi Sasaki handles the sound direction at Zack Promotion. The voice actors from the game returns to the anime. rêve parfait performs the opening theme titled "p.s. i hate you♡xxx" while Showtaro Morikubo performs the ending theme titled "because the sky..." under his character name Yorito Kisaka.
