= Soma Saito =

Japanese voice actor (born 1991)

- 斉藤 壮馬
- Born: Soma Saito (齊藤 壮馬); April 22, 1991 (age 35); Shōwa, Yamanashi Prefecture, Japan
- Occupations: Voice actor; singer
- Years active: 2010–present
- Agent: 81 Produce
- Musical career
- Genres: J-pop; anime song
- Instruments: Vocals; Guitar
- Years active: 2017–present
- Label: Sacra Music
- Website: www.saitosoma.com

Soma Saito (斉藤 壮馬, Saitō Sōma; born April 22, 1991) is a Japanese voice actor and singer affiliated with 81 Produce and Sacra Music.

== Early life ==
Saito was born on April 22, 1991, in Shōwa, Yamanashi Prefecture, Japan. He is the eldest of three siblings, with two younger sisters. He wanted to become a voice actor in high school, inspired by Akira Ishida's role as Koyemshi in Bokurano. Prior to that, he wanted to become a musician or a novel writer.

== Voice acting career ==
Saito joined the second 81 Produce's Audition in 2008. In that audition, a total of 1,035 people participated with only 33 going to the final audition to decide who would win and stay training under the talent agency. He won the audition for the male category and started taking voice acting classes at 81 ACTOR'S STUDIO afterwards, while still attending high school.

In 2009, Saito won the "Judges' Special Prize" in the recitation competition at the 33rd National High School Comprehensive Cultural Festival (Japanese: 全国高等学校総合文化祭, Hepburn: Zenkoku Kōtō Gakkō Sōgō Bunkamatsuri). Veteran voice actor Nobuyo Ōyama was one of the judges present at that time.

He started his career as a voice actor in 2010, voicing minor roles in a few anime and video games. He put less focus on his career as a voice actor during his first two years to focus on his studies at Waseda University. After graduating from college in 2014, he started to take on more important roles. The first major role that he got through audition was Tasuku Ryuenji in the anime series Future Card Buddyfight. In the same year, Saito got other major roles as Tadashi Yamaguchi in the anime series Haikyu!!, Tatsumi in the anime series Akame ga Kill!, and Twelve in the anime series Terror in Resonance.

At the 9th Seiyu Awards, Saito won the "Best Male Newcomer" award for his role as Twelve in the anime series Terror in Resonance. He shared the award with Ryōta Ōsaka and Natsuki Hanae. In March 2019, he and the other members of Hypnosis Mic received a singing award in the 13th Voice Actor Awards.

== Music career ==
Saito made his debut as a solo artist in 2017, under Sacra Music. He released his first single "Fish Story" (フィッシュストーリー) on June 7, 2017.

His second single "Yoake wa Mada/Hikari Tatsu Ame" (夜明けはまだ/ヒカリ断ツ雨) was released on September 6, 2017. The song "Hikari Tatsu Ame" (ヒカリ断ツ雨) was used as the opening theme song to Katsugeki/Touken Ranbu.

Saito released his third single "Date" (デート) on June 20, 2018. For his third single, he took upon himself songwriting duties, writing lyrics and music for all songs featured on it.

Saitō released his first album, quantum stranger, on December 19, 2018. On February 24, 2019, Saito held his 1st solo live concert entitled "Saito Soma 1st LIVE quantum stranger(s)" in Maihama Amphitheater. A blu-ray edition of the concert was released on June 5 of the same year the concert was held.

== Personal life ==
On June 30, 2023, Saito announced his marriage to a woman outside the industry.

== Filmography ==
=== Anime series ===
Television performances
Year	Title	Role	Notes	Sources
2011	Sengoku☆Paradise Kiwami	Tachibana Muneshige		
2011	Pretty Rhythm: Aurora Dream	Reporter	episode 5	
2013	Kill la Kill	One-Star Student	episode 4	
2013	Inazuma Eleven GO Galaxy	Ruslan Kasimov		
2013	Majestic Prince	Vessel No. 2 Pilot (ep 17), Radio Operator		
2013	Servant × Service	Customer B	episode 11	
2013	Tokyo Ravens	Student, Private-school Student		
2013	Non Non Biyori	Lost child center staff	episode 5	
2013	Pretty Rhythm: Rainbow Live	Store Clerk 1 (eps 9–10), Underling 2 (ep 16)		
2013	Pokémon: Black & White: Adventures in Unova and Beyond	Citizen		
2013	My Teen Romantic Comedy SNAFU	Senden Kouhou, Publicist male (eps 10–11), White team male (ep 13)		
2014	Akame ga Kill!	Tatsumi		
2014	Aldnoah.Zero	Yūtarō Tsumugi		
2014	Wizard Barristers	Masato Namase	episode 3	
2014	Mysterious Joker	Shadow Joker		
2014	Kamigami no Asobi	Student A		
2014	Terror in Resonance	Twelve/Tōji Hisami		
2014	Knights of Sidonia	Mochikuni Akai, pilot (eps 7, 10), congressman (ep 9)		
2014	SoniAni: Super Sonico The Animation	Guest B (ep 2); Cameraman A (ep 9)		
2014	Tribe Cool Crew	Yuzuru Tempoin		
2014	No-Rin	Student	episode 3–4	
2014	Haikyū!!	Tadashi Yamaguchi		
2014	Bakumatsu Rock	Justice Squad		
2014	Future Card Buddyfight	Demonic Beast, Grendel (card); Electron Ninja, Shiden (card), Student, Tasuku Ryūenji		
2014	Pokémon the Series: XY	Assistant		
2014	The Irregular at Magic High School	Kei Isori		
2014	Yowamushi Pedal	Motonari Tatebayashi	2 season	
2014	Lady Jewelpet	Curry Prince	episode 27	
2015	Your Lie in April	Audience		
2015	Aldnoah.Zero Part 2	Yūtarō Tsumugi		
2015	Saekano: How to Raise a Boring Girlfriend	Keiichi Katō		
2015	Ace of Diamond: Second Season	Mukai Taiyou		
2015	Is It Wrong to Try to Pick Up Girls in a Dungeon?	Hermes		
2015	Kyōkai no Rinne	Kain, Akuryō C		
2015	Plastic Memories	Max		
2015	Yamada-kun and the Seven Witches	Keigo Shibutani		
2015	Future Card Buddyfight 100	Tasuku Ryūenji		
2015	Chaos Dragon	Soirot Clasbari		
2015	Rokka no Yūsha	Adlet Mayer		
2015	Mobile Suit Gundam: Iron-Blooded Orphans	Yamagi Gilmerton	2 season	
2015	Dance with Devils	Rem Kaginuki		
2015	Tantei Team KZ Jiken Note	Kazuomi Wakatake		
2016	91 Days	Corteo		
2016	Hagane Orchestra	Chris		
2016	Age 12: A Little Heart-Pounding	Yūto Takao	two seasons	
2016	Ajin: Demi-Human	Takeshi Kotobuki	season two	
2016	BBK/BRNK	Hiiragi Nono	two season	
2016	Shoujo-tachi wa Kouya o Mezasu	Mitsuteru Ōgi (eps 10–12), Nakajima (ep 1)		
2016	D.Gray-man Hallow	Tokusa		
2016	Divine Gate	Aoto		
2016	Future Card Buddyfight DDD	Tasuku Ryūenji		
2016	Haruchika	Haruta Kamijo		
2016	Qualidea Code	Ichiya Suzaku		
2016	The Heroic Legend of Arslan: Dust Storm Dance	Jimsa		
2016	Magi: Adventure of Sinbad	Vittel		
2016	Battery: The Animation	Nobuhiro Yoshisada		
2016	Touken Ranbu: Hanamaru	Namazuo Toushirou, Tsurumaru Kuninaga	season one	
2016	WWW.Working!!	Daichi Saitou		
2017	Fuuka	Makoto Mikasa		
2017	Hand Shakers	Tazuna Takatsuki		
2017	Kyōkai no Rinne	Kain	season 3	
2017	Warau Salesman NEW	Iyata Deyashiro	episode 2	
2017	Is It Wrong to Try to Pick Up Girls in a Dungeon?: Sword Oratoria	Hermes		
2017	Granblue Fantasy The Animation	Feather	episode 12	
2017	Inazuma Eleven: Ares	Kirina Hiura		
2017	Katsugeki/Touken Ranbu	Tsurumaru Kuninaga		
2017	Akashic Records of Bastard Magic Instructor	Glenn Radars		
2017	Kado: The Right Answer	Shun Hanamori		
2017	Vatican Miracle Examiner	Lauren Di Luca		
2017	Infini-T Force	Tetsuya Azuma / Casshern		
2017	In Another World with My Smartphone	Lyon		
2017	Hell Girl: Yoi no Togi	Male student	season 4 episode 1	
2017	Kino no Tabi – the Beautiful World- the Animated Series	Hermes		
2017	Dynamic Chord	Sōtarō Haruna (Liar-S)		
2017	Tsukipro the Animation	Tsubasa Okui		
2018	Zoku Touken Ranbu: Hanamaru	Namazuo Toushirou, Tsurumaru Kuninaga	season two	
2018	Sanrio Danshi	Yū Mizuno		
2018	Idolish7	Tenn Kujo		
2018	The Caligula Effect Game	Ike-P		
2018	Dame×Prince Anime Caravan	Ruze		
2018	Pop Team Epic	Popuko	ep 9b	
2018	Darling in the Franxx	9'α		
2018	Piano no Mori	Kai Ichinose		
2018	Captain Tsubasa	Jun Misugi		
2018	Layton Mystery Detective Agency: Kat's Mystery-Solving Files	Luke Triton		
2018	The Thousand Musketeers	Hidetada		
2018	Banana Fish	Lao Yen-Thai		
2018	Skull-face Bookseller Honda-san	Honda-san		
2018	SSSS.Gridman	Shō Utsumi		
2019	Revisions	Keisaku Asano		
2019	W'z	Tazuna Takatsuki		
2019	Kyou mo Tsuno ga Aru	Nessie		
2019	JoJo's Bizarre Adventure: Golden Wind	Vinegar Doppio		
2019	Grimms Notes the Animation	Ludwig Grimm		
2019	King of Prism: Shiny Seven Stars	Yukinojō Tachibana		
2019	Star-Myu: High School Star Musical	Ryo Fuyusawa	season 3	
2019	Ensemble Stars!	Hinata Aoi, Yūta Aoi		
2019	BEM	Daryl Bryson		
2019	Star Twinkle PreCure	Lolo		
2019	Ahiru no Sora	Tokitaka Tokiwa		
2019	Case File nº221: Kabukicho	Fuyuto Kyogoku		
2019	Ace of Diamond act II	Mukai Taiyou		
2020	number24	Madoka Hongō		
2020	Drifting Dragons	Giraud		
2020	Infinite Dendrogram	Ray Starling		
2020	Uchitama?! Have you seen my Tama?	Tama Okamoto		
2020	Haikyū!!: To the Top	Tadashi Yamaguchi		
2020	Appare-Ranman!	Al Leon		
2020	Idolish7: Second Beat!	Tenn Kujo		
2020	Woodpecker Detective's Office	Isamu Yoshii		
2020	Hypnosis Mic: Division Rap Battle: Rhyme Anima	Gentaro Yumeno	Two seasons	
2020	Moriarty the Patriot	William James Moriarty		
2020	TSUKIUTA THE ANIMATION 2	Tsubasa Okui		
2021	Suppose a Kid from the Last Dungeon Boonies Moved to a Starter Town	Shōma		
2021	I-Chu: Halfway Through the Idol	Tatsumi Madarao		
2021	Skate-Leading Stars	Noa Kuonji		
2021	Ex-Arm	Akira Natsume		
2021	Burning Kabaddi	Hiromoto Utou		
2021	Odd Taxi	Tanaka		
2021	Backflip!!	Kyōichi Ryūgamori		
2021	Re-Main	Shūgo Amihama		
2021	Tsukipro the Animation 2	Tsubasa Okui		
2021	Megaton Musashi	Teru Asami		
2021	The Night Beyond the Tricornered Window	Keita Mukae		
2021	Yu-Gi-Oh! Sevens	Yuran Goha	Season 2	
2021	Idolish7: Third Beat!	Tenn Kujo		
2022	Orient	Kojiro Kanemaki		
2022	Tokyo 24th Ward	Kunai		
2022	Sasaki and Miyano	Yoshikazu Miyano		
2022	The Genius Prince's Guide to Raising a Nation Out of Debt	Wein		
2022	Heroines Run the Show	YUI		
2022	Engage Kiss	Shu Ogata/Scott Overture		
2022	RWBY: Ice Queendom	Lie Ren		
2022	Classroom of the Elite 2nd Season	Miyabi Nagumo		
2022	The Human Crazy University	Jack		
2022	Idolish7: Third Beat! Part 2	Tenn Kujo		
2022	Blue Lock	Hyōma Chigiri		
2022	I'm the Villainess, So I'm Taming the Final Boss	James Charles		
2023	UniteUp!	Lin Otsuki		
2023	Magical Destroyers	Shobon		
2023	Demon Slayer: Kimetsu no Yaiba – Swordsmith Village Arc	Aizetsu		
2023	Rurouni Kenshin	Himura Kenshin		
2023	Sugar Apple Fairy Tale	Gladice		
2023	Undead Girl Murder Farce	Jack the Ripper		
2023	Beyblade X	Ekusu Kurosu		
2023	Bikkuri-Men	Phoenix		
2024	Mr. Villain's Day Off	Rooney		
2024	Doctor Elise	Michael De Romanoff		
2024	Sengoku Youko	Jinka		
2024	The Seven Deadly Sins: Four Knights of the Apocalypse	Chion		
2024	Astro Note	Takumi Miyasaki		
2024	Twilight Out of Focus	Shion Yoshino		
2024	Egumi Legacy	Ukkari Hachibee		
2025	Wind Breaker	Seiryū Sakaki	Season 2	
2025	#Compass 2.0: Combat Providence Analysis System	Reiya		
2025	With Vengeance, Sincerely, Your Broken Saintess	Sven Zied-Crown		
2025	My Friend's Little Sister Has It In for Me!	Ozuma Kohinata		
2025	Si-Vis: The Sound of Heroes	June		
2025	Tojima Wants to Be a Kamen Rider	Mitsuha Shimamura		
2026	A Gentle Noble's Vacation Recommendation	Lizel		
2026	Jujutsu Kaisen	Rin Amai		
2026	Marriagetoxin	Genya Naruko		
2026	The Duke's Son Claims He Won't Love Me yet Showers Me with Adoration	Julius Roias		
2026	Perfect Addiction	Sae Takatsuki		
2026	Red River	User Ramses		
2026	Psyren	Oboro Mochizuki		
2027	Mashle: Magic & Muscles	Domina Blowelive		
TBA	Junket Bank	Shin Mafutsu		
TBA	Melody of the Boundary	Minoru		

=== Original video animation (OVA) ===
List of voice performances in OVA
Year	Title	Role	Source
2011	Aa! Megami-sama!	Club Member B	
2013	Niji-iro Prism Girl	Staff	
2014	Age 12	Yūto Takao	
2014	Magi: Adventure of Sinbad	Vittel	
2015	Yamada-kun and the Seven Witches	Keigo Shibutani	
2015	Haikyū!!	Tadashi Yamaguchi	
2016	Is It Wrong to Try to Pick Up Girls in a Dungeon?	Hermes	
2016	Persona 5	Naoya Makigami	
2016	Black Clover	Yuno	
2016	Ginga Kikōtai Majestic Prince: Mirai e no Tsubasa	Sei Yuzuriha	
2017	Yume Ōkoku to Nemureru 100-Nin no Ōji-sama Short Stories	Ritz	
2018	Yakusoku no Nanaya Matsuri	Shoma Mihara	
2020	Strike the Blood IV	The Blood	
2024	Code Geass: Rozé of the Recapture	Arnold	

=== Original net animation (ONA) ===
Year	Title	Role
2019	Monster Strike	Noah
2019	Monster Strike: End Of The World	Noah
2021	Record of Ragnarok	Adam
2022	Kotaro Lives Alone	Aota

=== Animated films ===
List of voice performances in film
Year	Title	Role	Source
2015	Ongaku Shoujo	Moderator	
2015	Gekijō-ban Haikyu!! Owari to Hajimari	Tadashi Yamaguchi	
2016	King of Prism by Pretty Rhythm	Yukinojō Tachibana	
2016	Ajin: Shōgeki	Takeshi Kotobuki	
2016	Gekijōban Ginga Kikōtai Majestic Prince	Sei Yuzuriha	
2017	Lu Over the Wall	Kunio	
2017	King of Prism: Pride the Hero	Yukinojō Tachibana	
2017	Dance with Devils: Fortuna	Rem Kaginuki	
2017	Touken Ranbu: Hanamaru – Makuai Kaisouroku	Namazuo Toushirou, Tsurumaru Kuninaga	
2018	Infini-T Force: Gatchaman Saraba Tomo yo	Tetsuya Azuma / Casshern	
2019	Is It Wrong to Try to Pick Up Girls in a Dungeon?: Arrow of the Orion	Hermes	
2019	Fafner in the Azure: The Beyond	Maurice Excelsior	
2019	Kimi dake ni Motetainda	Tokio Furuta	
2020	Love Me, Love Me Not	Kazuomi Inui	
2020	Monster Strike The Movie: Lucifer Zetsubō no Yoake	Noah	
2020	Kono Sekai no Tanoshimikata: Secret Story Film	Yui	
2021	Mobile Suit Gundam: Hathaway	Lane Aim	
2022	Eien no 831	Suzushirо̄ Asano	
2022	Ensemble Stars!! Road to Show!!	Hinata Aoi	
2022	Backflip!!	Kyōichi Ryūgamori	
2023	Sasaki and Miyano: Graduation	Yoshikazu Miyano	
2023	Gridman Universe	Shō Utsumi	
2023	Gekijōban Collar × Malice Deep Cover	Mineo Enomoto	
2024	Haikyu!! The Dumpster Battle	Tadashi Yamaguchi	
2024	Blue Lock: Episode Nagi	Hyōma Chigiri	
2026	Mobile Suit Gundam: Hathaway – The Sorcery of Nymph Circe	Lane Aim	

=== Video games ===
Year	Series	Role	Additional Crew Roles/Notes	Source
2010	Class of Heroes 2G	Limon		
2010	Sangoku Chaos	Zhao Yun		
2011	Star Project	Yūki Hasegawa, Ryūji Sakamoto		
2014	GranBlue Fantasy	Feather, Tsurumaru Kuninaga		
2014	Dynamic Chord	Sōtarō Haruna	PS Vita game	
2014	The Irregular at Magic High School: Out of Order	Kei Isori		
2014	Haikyū!! Tsunage! Itadaki no Keshiki!!	Tadashi Yamaguchi		
2014	Lost Dimension	Marco Barbato	PlayStation 3	
2014	Nyan Love ~Watashi no Koi no Mitsukekata~	Suguri Takuma	Nintendo 3DS Game	
2014	Touken Ranbu	Namazuo Toushirou, Tsurumaru Kuninaga		
2014	12-sai. ~Honto no Kimochi~	Takao Yuuto	Nintendo 3DS	
2014	The Cinderella Contract	Prince Yuri Aleksandrovich Rossiyskaya		
2015	Ensemble Stars!	Hinata Aoi, Yūta Aoi		
2015	Idolish7	Tenn Kujo	Multimedia project	
2015	Believer!	Kamishiro Kai	PS Vita game	
2015	Dynamic Chord feat. Liar-S	Sōtarō Haruna	PS Vita game	
2015	POSSESSION MAGENTA	Fukayama Mineharu	PS Vita	
2015	Teikoku Kaigun Koi Bojou ~Meiji Yokosuka Koushinkyoku~	Shizuma Souta	PS Vita	
2015	Cafe Cuillere	Sakuma Asahi	Smartphone game	
2016	Caligula	Ike-P	PS Vita game	
2016	Haikyū!! Donpisha Match!!	Tadashi Yamaguchi	Smartphone game	
2016	I-Chu	Tatsumi Madarao	Smartphone game	
2016	Shoujo-tachi wa Kouya o Mezasu	Oogi Mitsuteru		
2016	Dame×Prince Anime Caravan	Ruze	Smartphone game	
2016	POSSESSION MAGENTA	Shizuma Souta	PS Vita	
2016	MAFIAMORE	Ridio	Smartphone game	
2016	Kyoukai no Shirayuki	Kakeya Saji	PS Vita game	
2016	Dance with Devils	Rem Kaginuki	PS Vita game	
2016	12 Sai ~Koi Suru Diary~	Takao Yuuto	Nintendo 3DS	
2016	World of Final Fantasy	Lann		
2016	Oumagatoki ~Kakuriyo no En~	Tokiwa	PS Vita game	
2016	Collar × Malice	Mineo Enomoto		
2016	DYNAMIC CHORD feat. Liar-S V edition	Haruna Soutarou	PS Vita game	
2016	Comedy Prince	Shiratori Takuto	Smartphone game	
2016	SMASH DRAGOON		Smartphone game	
2016	Psychedelica of the Ashen Hawk	Levi	PS Vita game	
2016	Resort he Youkoso ~Soushihainin wa Koi wo Suru~		Smartphone game	
2016	Sanrio Danshi ~Watashi, Koi wo, Shirimashita~	Yū Mizuno	Smartphone game	
2017	CARAVAN STORIES	Ralph		
2017	Usotsuki Shangrila	Hati	PS Vita game	
2017	Minna de Game wo Tsukurou ~Project LayereD~	Will		
2017	Shironeko Tennis	Hiro		
2017	Stand My Heroes	Houshou Isaki	Smartphone game	
2017	KING OF PRISM – Prism Rush LIVE	Yukinojō Tachibana	Smartphone game	
2017	Dear Magic -Mahou Shounen Gakka-	Hinomiya Kaito	Smartphone game	
2017	Gensou Shinki -Link of Hearts-	Tyr	Smartphone game	
2017	Katsugeki Touken Ranbu ~Souten no Enishi~	Tsurumaru Kuninaga		
2017	TSUKINO PARADISE	Tsubasa Okui	Rhythm game on iOS and Android	
2017	Oujisama no Propose Eternal Kiss	Oliver Button	Smartphone game	
2017	Shin Megami Tensei: Strange Journey Redux	Anthony	Nintendo 3DS Game	
2017	Sengoku Night Blood	Kawai Sora	Smartphone game	
2017	AnimexGame "Layered Stories 0"	Will		
2017	Ayakashi Musubi	Yuugen Musubi	Smartphone game	
2017	Danmachi ~Memoria Freese~	Hermes	Smartphone game	
2018	Collar × Malice -Unlimited-	Mineo Enomoto	PS Vita game	
2018	Idolish7 Twelve Fantasia!	Tenn Kujo	PS Vita game	
2018	Charade Maniacs	Akase Kyouya	PS Vita game	
2018	Eto Kare ~Jyuunishi Kara Neko ga Moreta Riyuu~	Rin	Smartphone game	
2018	Fortissimo	Narimoto Osamu	PS Vita game	
2018	Senjyuushi	Hidetada	Smartphone game	
2018	Cafe Cuillere	Sakuma Asahi	PS Vita game	
2018	CHRONO MA:GIA	Knight Kisaragi	Smartphone game	
2018	Sin'en Resist	Shedar	Smartphone game	
2018	Palette Parade	Paul Gauguin	Smartphone game	
2018	Dance with Devils My Carol	Rem Kaginuki	PS Vita game	
2018	DYNAMIC CHORD JAM&JOIN!!!!	Haruna Soutarou	Smartphone game	
2018	Caligula Overdose	Ike-P	PS4	
2019	Crimson Clan	Tani Yuuma	Smartphone game	
2019	Blackstar – Theatre Starless	Menou	Smartphone game	
2019	Otome Yuusha	Megrez	Smartphone game	
2019	#Compass	Reiya	Smartphone game	
2019	A Certain Magical Index: Imaginary Fest	Thor	Smartphone game	
2019	Fate/Grand Order	Kirschtaria Wodime	Smartphone game	
2019	Namu Amida Butsu! -UTENA-	Tamonten, Nanda Ryūō, Bishamonten		
2020	Birushana Senki ~Genpei Hikamusou~	Shungen	Nintendo Switch	
2020	Brigandine Lunasia Senki	Rubino	Nintendo Switch	
2020	Collar × Malice	Mineo Enomoto	Nintendo Switch	
2020	Digimon ReArise	Kazuma Natsuyagi	Smartphone game	
2020	Arknights	Leonhardt	Smartphone game	
2020	Kamen Rider: Memory of Heroez	Kamen Rider Birth (Shintaro Goto)	PlayStation 4, Nintendo Switch	
2020	Genshin Impact	Chongyun	Smartphone, PC, PlayStation 4, PlayStation 5, Nintendo Switch	
2020	Ikemen Vampire	Vlad	Smartphone game	
2020	World Flipper	Reylas	Smartphone game	
2021	Virche Evermore -Error: Salvation-	Yves	Nintendo Switch	
2022	Bravely Default: Brilliant Lights	Steel Franklin	Smartphone game	
2022	The Legend of Heroes: Trails Through Daybreak II	Rion Balthazar	PlayStation 4, PlayStation 5	
2023	Engage Wars	Scott Overture		
2024	Reynatis	Michirou Kujirai	PlayStation 4, PlayStation 5, Nintendo Switch, PC	
TBA	SOUL REVERSE	Valor		

=== Drama CD ===
Audio drama performances
Year	Title	Role	Notes	Sources
2015	Mahō x Shōnen x Days!!!!!	Yūki		
2015	Dear Vocalist	JUDAH	Volume 3	
2015	Watanuki-san niha Boku ga Tarinai	Rikka Satsuki		
2015	Tsukipro Festa in Oshi na Monozume!	Tsubasa Okui		
2016	-Don't work too hard!- -Two of a kind.- SolidS Unit Song Series COLOR [-RED-] [-BLACK-] [-WHITE-] Zan 3 kan Kounyū Tokuten Mini Drama CD; SolidS KACHOFUGETSU Series Zan 4 kan Kounyū Tokuten Mini Drama CD	Tsubasa Okui	Volumes 1 & 2; Bonus CDs	
2016	Dance with Devils -EverSweet-	Kaginuki Rem		
2016	Mofudol~Kotousatsu Mofu Jiken Hen~			
2016	Minna de Gohan ssu yo!!	Shadow		
2016	Dear Vocalist Riot	JUDAH	Volume 2	
2016	DYNAMIC CHORD Vacation Trip CD series Liar-S	Haruna Soutarou		
2016	Haruchika ~Haruta to Chika wa Seishun suru~	Haruta Kamijo		
2016	Mahō x Shōnen x Days!!!!! Yuuenchi ni Shikakerareta Kuroi Wana	Yūki		
2016	POSSESSION MAGENTA Drama CD Volume 1 Kanade&Souta "Happy Summer Holiday"	Sota Shizuma		
2016	Cafe Cuillere Drama CD Premier Souvenirs 2 ~Asahi & Minato~	Sakuma Asahi		
2017	Waiting for Spring	Rui Miyamoto		
2017	Ouryuu	Sakakibara Jin		
2017	Gekiteki Kisou Onban – Adekan			
2017	Togishi Inosuke Fukugawa Hanashii			
2017	Collar × Malice ~Kaitou Adonis kara Chousenjou~	Mineo Enomoto		
2017	PPF -the past, the present, and the future- TSUKIPRO x Aniten Tokkyuu 2017 Summer Nationwide Edition; S.Q.P -SQ PARTY 2017 SUMMER- Tokuten Drama	Tsubasa Okui	Volume 3; Unit Crossover Drama; Bonus CD	
2017	Oresama Residence – Saionji San Kyoudai	Saoinji Gen		
2017	Kare ni Shinumade Aisareru CD "Midnight Kyonshi Tencho Yuugi" Dai Nana no Fuin CHUCHU	Chuchu		
2017	Akuma ni Sasayakare Miryo sareru CD "Dance with Devils – Charming Book -" Vol.1 Rem	Kaginuki Rem		
2017	Mobile Suit Gundam IRON-BLOODED ORPHANS 2	Yamagi Gilmerton		
2017	Dear Vocalist Wired	JUDAH	Volume 3	
2018	Grimm&Gritty	Shinra Touya		
2018	Dear Vocalist Xtreme	JUDAH	Volume 3	
2018	Kumo no Mukou ni Itsuka no Ano Hi、 Hoshizora no Shita de Warau Kimi o Mita; Daina Cinderella; Uchiage hen Glass no Kutsu o Fumishimete; SQ SolidS DramaCD vol.4・vol.5 Rendou Kounyū Tokuten Mini Drama CD	Tsubasa Okui	Volumes 4 & 5; Fairy Tale Lottery CDs; Bonus CD	
2018	Koi wo Yobu ni wa Kimochi Warui	Amakusa Ryou	Volume 4	
2018	Waiting for Spring	Rui Miyamoto	Volume 9	
2018	Dandara Gohan	Shinpachi Nagakura		
2019	Dear brother TSUKIPRO Nichijou Kobanashi Shū Yaminabe Drama ①	Tsubasa Okui	Volume 6; Unit Crossover Drama	
2019	Otodoke Kareshi Cherish Vol.4 Naruse Ritsu	Naruse Ritsu	Volume 4	
2019	Dear Vocalist Evolve	JUDAH	Volume 3	
2019	Ore-sama Residence CRAZY x ALIVE!! Side: ALIVE	Saoinji Gen		
2019	Ore-sama Residence CRAZY x ALIVE!! Side: CRAZY	Saoinji Gen		
2019	Otodoke Kareshi Cherish			
2020	Drama CD SCRAMBLE BIRTH DAY			
2020	Collar X Malice Drama CD – Sasazuka Takeru Yukai Jiken -	Mineo Enomoto		
2020	Oresama Residence – LOVE or FATE – Drama 1. Chapter of Saionji	Saoinji Gen		
2020	CharadeManiacs Character & Drama Vol.3	Akase Kyouya	Volume 3	
2020	My Friend's Little Sister Has It in for Me!	Ozuma Kohinata		
2020	Queen's Quality	Kyutaro Horikita		
2021	Dear Vocalist Raving Beats!!!	JUDAH	Volume 3	

=== Boys love CDs ===
Audio drama performances
Year	Title	Role	Notes	Sources
2014	Gouman Ouji to Secret Love	Kurehashi Asato		
2014	Shinjoukun to Sasaharakun			
2014	Vanilla Resort			
2014	Koketsu Dining	Reiji		
2015	DRAMAtical Murder Drama CD Vol.4 – Noiz	Theo		
2015	Gouman Ouji to Private Kiss	Kurehashi Asato		
2015	Oni no Ou to Chigire	Tokimori		
2015	Toiki wa Yasashiku Shihai Suru			
2015	Toshigoro no Otokonoko to Are	Sakurai Keisuke		
2015	Girou no Gunjin	Tsukisato Ren		
2015	Sonna Me de Mitekure	Nezaki Haru		
2015	Koi Niwa Funare na Mono Dakara			
2016	Links	Nakajou Shinobu		
2016	Given	Satou Mafuyu		
2016	Ai no Sabaki wo Ukero!	Hachisuka Iku		
2016	Ai no Wana ni Hamare!	Hachisuka Iku		
2016	MODS	Shiro		
2017	Gouman Ouji to Honeymoon	Kurehashi Asato		
2017	Given 2	Satou Mafuyu		
2017	Given 2 limited edition	Satou Mafuyu		
2017	Michi to no Souguu	Shibuya		
2017	Niichan	Yui		
2017	Blue Sky Complex second	Terajima's junior high school classmate		
2017	Crack Star	Mio		
2018	Kimi wa Hiniku na Kirakira Boshi	Saikawa Ayumu		
2018	Given 3	Satou Mafuyu		
2018	Kakkou no Yume	Shougo Nazuka		
2018	Sasaki to Miyano	Miyano		
2018	Momo to Manji	Momoki		
2018	Koubutsu wa Kossori Kakushite Hara no Naka	Luke		
2018	MODS after story	Shiro		
2018	Me o Tojitemo Hikari wa Mieruyo	Amou Hikaru		
2018	Akai Ito no Shikkou Yuuyo	Hiro		
2018	Change World	Hozumi Masato		
2018	THEO	Theo		
2018	Given 4	Satou Mafuyu		
2018	NIGHTS BEFORE NIGHT	Shiro		
2019	No Color Baby	Mashiro		
2019	Momo to Manji 2	Momoki		
2019	Rakka Ryuusui no Hoshi	Kuze Akihito		
2019	Utsukushii Kare	Sou Kiyoi		
2019	Blue Sky Complex third	Terajima's junior high school classmate		
2019	Yoidore Koi o Sezu	Suwa Misumi		
2019	Itoshi no XL Size	Yamamoto Aoi		
2019	Rara no Kekkon	Ramudan		
2019	Blue Sky Complex fourth	Terajima's junior high school classmate		
2020	Given 5	Satou Mafuyu		
2020	Double Standards	Riku		
2020	Love Nest	Masato		
2020	Midara na Neko wa Tsume wo Kakusu			
2020	Shounen no Kyoukai	Yuka		
2020	Kiraide Isasete	Koga Naoto		
2020	Koisuru Ryu no Shima	Nishino		
2020	Rara no Kekkon 2	Ramudan		
2020	Eto Irokoizoushi			
2020	At 25:00, in Akasaka	Yuki Shirasaki		
2020	Shinjusurumade Mattetene			
2021	Kiraide Isasete 2	Koga Naoto		
2021	Blue Sky Complex fifth	Terajima's junior high school classmate		
2021	Midara na Neko wa Amaku Naku			
2021	Osananajimi ja Gaman Dekinai	Aoi		
2021	Nikurashii Kare	Sou Kiyoi		
2021	Ikigami to Donor	Yoshino		
2021	Muri Marriage	Momoki Shirakawa		
2022	Kabukicho Bad Trip	Hikawa Mizuki		
2022	Osananajimi ja Gaman Dekinai 2	Aoi		
2022	Yoiyoi Monologue			
2022	At 25:00, in Akasaka 2	Yuki Shirasaki		
2022	Blue Sky Complex sixth	Terajima's junior high school classmate		
2022	Haru Kakete, Uguisu	Shirakawa Haruka		
2022	Kabukicho Bad Trip 2	Hikawa Mizuki		
2022	Kiraide Isasete 3	Koga Naoto		
2024	Monster and Ghost	Aya Nanahisa		

=== Stage ===
List of stage performances
Year	Title	Role
2019	We Married as a Job	Ryouta Kazami

=== TV Show ===
Year	Title	Role	Notes
2015	Tokyo Otome Restaurant Season 2	guest	
2016	Ono Kensho ga Yuku Tabitomo Volume 3 featuring Ishikawa and Saito Soma	guest	
2017	Eguchi Takuya no Oretachi Datte Mo~tto Iyasaretai! Season 3	Narrator	
2017	Saito Soma no Wagokoro wo Kimi ni	MC	

=== Dubbing roles ===
Voice over performances
Year	Title	Role	Original performer	Notes	Sources
2014	Young Justice: Invasion	Robin/Tim Drake	Cameron Bowen		
2015	When the Game Stands Tall	Arturo Garcia	Matthew Frias		
2015	RWBY	Lie Ren	Monty Oum, Neath Oum		
2015	Song One	Henry Ellis	Ben Rosenfield		
2018	How to Talk to Girls at Parties	Enn	Alex Sharp		
2020	Dolittle	Jip	Tom Holland		
2020	Trolls World Tour	Guy Diamond	Kenan Thompson		
2022	The Staircase	Todd Peterson	Patrick Schwarzenegger		
2025	Zootopia 2	Zebro Zebrowski	CM Punk	Animation	

== Discography ==
=== Singles ===
#	Year	Release Date	Title	Catalog No.				
#	Year	Release Date	Title	Catalog No.	Oricon Weekly Singles Chart	Billboard Hot 100 Chart	Billboard Hot Animation Chart	Billboard Top Singles Sales Chart
1st	2017	June 6	"フィッシュストーリー (Fish Story)"	VVCL-1055 / VVCL-1053/4	9	—	4	10
2nd	2017	September 18	"夜明けはまだ/ヒカリ断ツ雨 (Yoake wa Mada/Hikari Tatsu Ame)"	VVCL-1090 / VVCL-1088/9	7	—	11	9
3rd	2018	June 20	"デート (Date)"	VVCL-1260 / VVCL-1258/9	7	10	1	6
4th	2020	March 22	"エピローグ (Epilogue)"	—	—	—	—	—
5th	2020	June 27	"ペトリコール (Petrichor)"	—	—	—	—	—
6th	2020	August 19	"Summerholic!"	—	—	—	—	—
7th	2020	September 19	"パレット (Palette)"	—	—	—	—	—

=== EPs ===
Title	EP details	Oricon chart peak	Sales
My Blue Vacation	Released: December 18, 2019; Label: Sacra Music; Formats: CD, digital download	5	—
My Beautiful Valentine	Released: February 9, 2022; Label: Sacra Music; Formats: CD, digital download	5	—
Yin/Yang (陰/陽)	Released: December 7, 2022; Label: Sacra Music; Formats: CD, digital download	9	JPN: 9,469
Nuance	Released: November 5, 2025; Label: Sacra Music; Formats: CD, digital download	16	JPN: 4,108

=== Digital albums ===
Title	Album details	Peak chart	Sales
Secret Tracks	Released: November 7, 2022; Label: Sacra Music; Formats: CD, digital download	29	163

=== Studio albums ===
Title	Album details	Peak chart	Sales
Quantum Stranger	Released: December 19, 2018; Label: Sacra Music; Formats: CD, digital download	4	24,854
In Bloom	Released: December 23, 2020; Label: Sacra Music; Formats: CD, digital download	5	—
Fictions	Released: September 25, 2024; Label: Sacra Music; Formats: CD, digital download	19	4,437

=== Character song ===
Year	Release date	Album	Role	Track title	note
2015	March 13	SolidS vol.1	SolidS	「S.N.P」 「Labyrinth」 「Exit Of Days」	Character song of SQ
2015	April 1	FlyME Project「MEDICODE」	Shadow	「CARMA」 「HOLLOW」	Character song of FlyME Project
2015	April 24	Kabe Don! SONG♪" Series 2nd "Sono Kare, Rebun Shoya	Rebun Shoya	「Boku wa kimi no Hishatai」	Character song of Kabe Don! SONG♪
2015	May 13	Buddy Lights	Tasuku Ryuenji	「Buddy Lights」	TV Anime Future Card Buddyfight 100 Ending Theme
2015	May 13	Buddy Lights	Tasuku Ryuenji	「Blue x Red no Chikai」	TV Anime Future Card Buddyfight 100 Character Song
2015	May 27	Emotional Possession	Shizuma Souta	「Purely Sunshine」	Game Possession Magenta Ending Theme
2015	May 29	SolidS vol.2	SolidS	「TIGHT/NIGHT」	Character song of SQ
2015	May 29	SolidS vol.2	Tsubasa Okui; Dai Murase	「GRAVE OF LOVERS」	Character song of SQ
2015	May 29	SolidS vol.2	Tsubasa Okui	「FLARE」	Character song of SQ
2015	July 31	SolidS vol.3	SolidS	「SEXY☆SENSE」	Character song of SQ
2015	July 31	SolidS vol.3	Tsubasa Okui; Shiki Takamura	「クロノア -chronoah-」	Character song of SQ
2015	October 21	Mademo★iselle	PENTACLE★	「Mademo★iselle」	TV Anime Dance with Devils Ending Song
2015	October 21	Mademo★iselle	PENTACLE★	「Kakumei zenya -The Eve of the Revolution-」	TV Anime Dance with Devils Character Song
2015	October 28	Dance With Devils Character Single 1 Rem Kaginuki	Rem Kaginuki	「DESTINARE!」 「Waga Na wa Rem Arlond」	TV Anime Dance with Devils Character Song
2015	October 31	SolidS vol.4	SolidS	「ロミオ -ROMEO-」 「Doubutsu no Saga」 「Midnight Mystery」	Character song of SQ
2015	December 12	SECRET NIGHT	TRIGGER	「SECRET NIGHT」 「NATSU☆Shiyouze!」 「Leopard Eyes」	Game Idolish7 Song
2015	December 23	Ensemble★Stars! UNIT SONG CD Vol.6 2Wink	2Wink	「Sugar Spice Houteishiki」 「Kangei☆2・Wink Zatsugi dan」	Character song of 2Wink
2015	December 23	Escalation!	KAGARIBI	「Escalation!」 「Sweet Devil's Night」	Character song of JUDAH
2016	March 25	RED	SolidS	「CRAZY BABY SHOW」	Character song of SQ
2016	May 27	BLACK	SolidS	「Judas」	Character song of SQ
2016	May 27	BLACK	Tsubasa Okui; Rikka Sera	「BLACK HEAVEN」	Character song of SQ
2016	June 24	Canaria -Kie Yuku Sora ni-	Tsubasa Okui	「Canaria -Kie Yuku Sora ni-」	Character song of SQ
2016	September 18	Last Dimension ~Hikigane O Hiku No Wa Dare Da~	TRIGGER	「Last Dimension ~Hikigane O Hiku No Wa Dare Da~」	Game Idolish7 Song
2016	September 28	Ensemble★Stars! UNIT SONG CD☆2nd Vol.02 2Wink	2Wink	「Heart Prism・Symmetry」 「2winkle Star Beat☆」	Character song of 2Wink
2016	September 30	WHITE	SolidS	「Liar・Crier」 「TOKYO LOVE JUNKIE」	Character song of SQ
2016	November 16	New World	KAGARIBI	「New World」 「I Can't Say GoodBye」	Character song of JUDAH
2017	February 24	Omote SolidS	SolidS	「Cocoro」	Character song of SQ
2017	March 15	「Dear Vocalist THE BEST Rock Out!!!」 TYPE B JUDAH・A'・MOMOCHI	KAGARIBI	「Judge!!!!」	Character song of JUDAH
2017	May 26	VOL.2 TSUBASA X ICHIRU	Tsubasa Okui	「Shout It Out」	Character song of SQ
2017	June 30	Ura SolidS	SolidS	「KARA DA KARA」	Character song of SQ
2017	September 20	REGALITY	TRIGGER	「SECRET NIGHT」 「NATSU☆Shiyouze!」 「Last Dimension ~Hikigane O Hiku No Wa Dare Da~」 「Leopard Eyes」 「Negai wa Shine on the Sea」 「DAYBREAK INTERLUDE」 「In the meantime」 「DESTINY」	Game Idolish7 Song
2017	September 20	REGALITY	Tenn Kujo	「U COMPLETE ME」	Game Idolish7 Song
2017	September 20	Hishou	KAGARIBI	「Hishou」 「TSK!! TSK!!」	Character song of JUDAH
2017	September 27	Collar X Malice Character CD vol.3 Enomoto Mineo	Mineo Enomoto	「ONLY YOUR HERO」	Character song of Collar X Malice
2017	October 4	ENSEMBLE STARS! UNIT SONG CD 3RD VOLUME 05 2Wink	2Wink feat. UNDEAD	「TRICK with TREAT!!」	Character song of 2Wink
2017	October 4	ENSEMBLE STARS! UNIT SONG CD 3RD VOLUME 05 2Wink	2Wink	「WONDER WONDER TOY LAND」	Character song of 2Wink
2017	October 6	Burny!!!	SolidS	「Burny!!!」	Opening theme song of Tsukipro the Animation
2017	November 3	Hypnosis Mic -Division Rap Battle-	Division All Stars	「Hypnosis Mic -Division Rap Battle-」	Character song of Hypnosis Microphone
2017	December 22	Tsukipro the Animation Volume 1	SolidS	「Ouka Ranman」	Ending theme song of Tsukipro the Animation
2017	December 27	Fling Posse -F.P.S.M-	Gentaro Yumeno	「Scenario Liar」	Character song of Hypnosis Microphone
2018	February 23	Tsukipro the Animation Volume 3	SolidS	「Back On Track」	Ending theme song of Tsukipro the Animation
2018	February 28	Heavenly Visitor	TRIGGER	「Heavenly Visitor」 「DIAMOND FUSION」	Game Idolish7 Song
2018	April 27	Tsukipro the Animation Volume 5	SolidS	「Unmei wo Koeru "Venga"」	Ending theme song of Tsukipro the Animation
2018	May 4	Hypnosis Mic -Division Battle Anthem-	Division All Stars	「Hypnosis Mic -Division Battle Anthem-」	Character song of Hypnosis Microphone
2018	May 16	(Dis)Appeared	KAGARIBI	「(Dis)Appeared」 「Longing」	Character song of JUDAH
2018	May 25	vol.1 Shiki & Tsubasa	Tsubasa Okui; Shiki Takamura	「LADY JOKER」	Character song of SQ
2018	June 15	Tsukipro the Animation Volume 7	SOARA, Growth, SolidS, & QUELL	「Dear Dreamer,」	Ending theme song of Tsukipro the Animation
2018	July 9	12 SONGS GIFT	Tenn Kujo	「Up to the nines」	Character song of Idolish7
2018	July 18	Fling Posse VS. Matenrou	Fling Posse	「BATTLE BATTLE BATTLE」 「Shibuya Marble Texture -PCCS-」	Character song of Hypnosis Microphone
2018	September 19	「Dear Vocalist THE BEST Rock Out!!! #2」 TYPE B A'・JUDAH・YOU	KAGARIBI	「2 of a Kind」	Character song of JUDAH
2019	January 25	vol.3 SolidS	SolidS	「DOPE↗ROCK」	Character song of SQ
2019	April 24	Enter the Hypnosis Microphone	Division All Stars	「Hoodstar」	Character song of Hypnosis Microphone
2019	April 24	Enter the Hypnosis Microphone	Fling Posse	「Stella」	Character song of Hypnosis Microphone
2019	May 31	vol.5 Tsubasa & Dai	Tsubasa Okui; Dai Murase	「Kiss Me Quick」	Character song of SQ
2019	July 9	Wonderful Octave	Tenn Kujo	「Up to the nines」 「Wonderful Octave -Tenn ver.-」	Character song of Idolish7
2019	July 26	vol.6 SolidS	SolidS	「I AM A BARTENDER」	Character song of SQ
2019	September 18	Saiai	KAGARIBI	「Saiai」 「Invisible Man」	Character song of JUDAH
2020	January 29	Crescent rise	TRIGGER	「Crescent rise」 「Treasure!」	Character song of Idolish7
2020	February 26	Fling Posse -Before The Second D.R.B-	Gentaro Yumeno	「Utena」	Character song of Hypnosis Microphone
2020	April 24	DIAMOND♦	SolidS	「GAME IS MINE」 「Timeless」	Character song of SQ
2020	August 28	Dear Dreamer, Ver.SolidS	SolidS	「Dear Dreamer,」	Character song of SQ
2020	November 18	My Precious World	TRIGGER	「My Precious World」	Character song of Idolish7
2020	November 27	Vol.2 Tsubasa & Ichiru	Tsubasa Okui; Ichiru Kuga	「Arata na COLOR」	Character song of SQ
2021	March 24	Display	KAGARIBI	「Display」 「Hypothesis」 「MY BLEACH」	Character song of JUDAH
2021	June 23	VARIANT	TRIGGER	「VALIANT」 「Heavenly Visitor」 「Treasure!」 「Crescent rise」 「Baratsuyu」 「My Precious World」 「DIAMOND FUSION」	Character song of Idolish7
2021	July 9	LOVE 'Em All	SolidS	「LOVE 'Em All」	Opening theme song of Tsukipro the Animation 2
2021	July 14	PLACES	TRIGGER	「PLACES」 「Smile Again」	Ending theme song of Idolish7: Third Beat!
2021	November 26	Tsukipro the Animation 2 Volume 1	SolidS	「KAN-ZEN-OFF-MODE」	Ending theme song of Tsukipro the Animation 2
2022	January 28	Tsukipro the Animation 2 Volume 3	Morihito Arihara; Soshi Kagurazaka; Kensuke Yaegashi; Ryota Sakuraba; Shiki Takamura; Tsubasa Okui	「Nagori Oni」	Ending theme song of Tsukipro the Animation 2
2022	February 23	Sasaki and Miyano Character Song Single	Shuumei Sasaki; Yoshikazu Miyano	「Ichigo Sunset」	Ending theme song of Sasaki and Miyano
2022	February 23	FT4	Full Throttle4	「BROTHER」 「LOVE ANTHEM」 「TO FAMILY」 「BLUE」 「FAKE STAR」 「TIME LINE」 「Dear LAYLA」 「Alive」 「GOOD BYE」	
2022	April 29	Tsukipro the Animation 2 Volume 6	SolidS	「Kamikazari no Corsage」	Ending theme song of Tsukipro the Animation 2

== Concerts ==
=== Personal Concerts ===
Date	Title	Venue	Source
February 24, 2019	Soma Saito 1st Live "quantum stranger(s)"	Maihama Amphitheater	
April – May 2021	We are in Bloom Live Tour 2021	【Fukuoka】 April 17, 2021 (Saturday) Fukuoka Sun Palace Hotel & Hall	
		【Aichi】 April 24, 2021 (Saturday) Aichi Prefectural Art Theater Large Hall	
		【Osaka】- canceled May 2, 2021 (Sunday) Osaka International Convention Center (Grand Cube Osaka) Main Hall	
		【Tokyo】 May 22, 2021 (Saturday) Tokyo Garden Theater May 23, 2021 (Sunday) Tokyo Garden Theater	

=== Other concerts ===
Date	Title	Venue	Source
April 10, 2016	TSUKIPRO LIVE 2016 in NAKANO	Nakano Sun Plaza	
July 16, 2017	S.Q.P -SQ PARTY 2017 SUMMER-	Ryōgoku Kokugikan	
June 17, 2018	TSUKIPRO LIVE2018 SUMMER CARNIVAL	Fuji-Q Highland Conifer Forest	
May 18–19, 2019	SACRA MUSIC FES.2019–NEW GENERATION-	Makuhari Event Hall	
December 8, 2019	S.Q.P Ver.SolidS	Tokyo International Forum Hall C	

== Awards ==
Year	Award	Category	Result
2015	9th Seiyu Awards	Best Rookie Actors	Won
2018	40th Anime Grand Prix	Best Voice Actor	Won
2019	3rd Crunchyroll Anime Awards	Best VA Performance (Japanese)	Nominated
2019	41st Anime Grand Prix	Best Voice Actor	Won
2022	16th Seiyu Awards	Singing Award	Won
