= Katsugeki/Touken Ranbu =

Japanese anime television series

活撃 刀剣乱舞 (Katsugeki Tōken Ranbu)
- Anime television series
- Directed by: Toshiyuki Shirai
- Produced by: Shizuka Kurosaki; Tarō Deji; Jun Morita; Hikaru Kondo; Yoshiki Usa
- Written by: Hikaru Kondo
- Music by: Hideyuki Fukasawa
- Studio: Ufotable
- Licensed by: AUS: Madman Entertainment; NA: Aniplex of America; SEA: Medialink; UK: MVM Films
- Original network: Tokyo MX, BS11, GTV, GYT, MBS, AT-X, OX, KSS, EBC
- Original run: July 1, 2017 – September 23, 2017
- Episodes: 13
- Manga
- Written by: Tsuda Honami
- Published by: Shueisha
- Magazine: Jump Square; (2017); Jump Square online; (2018–2019)
- Original run: July 4, 2017 – April 4, 2019
- Volumes: 5
- Anime film
- Studio: Ufotable
- Released: TBA
- Related anime
- Touken Ranbu: Hanamaru (spin-off)

Katsugeki/Touken Ranbu (活撃 刀剣乱舞; lit. 'Dynamic Attack/Dance of the Wild Swords') is a Japanese anime television series produced by Ufotable and Aniplex and directed by Toshiyuki Shirai, with music composed by Hideyuki Fukasawa. It is based on the video game Touken Ranbu. The anime series aired between July 1 and September 23, 2017. An anime theatrical film project is currently in production.

== Plot ==
In the year 1863, Japan is split between the warring pro-shogunate and anti-shogunate factions. Izuminokami Kanesada is a Tōken danshi (刀剣男士, lit. 'Sword Warrior'), which is a tsukumogami of a historical Japanese blade brought to life by the Saniwa (審神者). With new recruit Horikawa Kunihiro, they chase after the Jikan sokōgun (時間遡行軍, lit. 'Time Retrograde Army') to reclaim a mysterious cargo capable of changing history. Joined by Tonbokiri, Yagen Toushirou, Mutsunokami Yoshiyuki, and Tsurumaru Kuninaga, the Second Unit fights to maintain the rightful course of time.

== Characters ==
Character	Japanese	English
Izuminokami Kanesada	Ryōhei Kimura	Robbie Daymond
Mutsunokami Yoshiyuki	Kento Hama	Ben Diskin
Horikawa Kunihiro	Junya Enoki	Zach Aguilar
Yagen Tōshirō	Seiichirō Yamashita	Billy Kametz
Tonbokiri	Tooru Sakurai	Xander Mobus
Tsurumaru Kuninaga	Sōma Saitō	Mark Whitten
Saniwa	Junko Minagawa	Cristina Vee
Konnosuke	Takuma Nagatsuka	Khoi Dao
Yamanbagiri Kunihiro	Tomoaki Maeno	Alan Lee
Honebami Toushirou	Yuto Suzuki	Griffin Burns
Mikazuki Munechika	Kōsuke Toriumi	Todd Haberkorn
Higekiri	Natsuki Hanae	Kyle McCarley
Hizamaru	Nobuhiko Okamoto	Joe Zieja
Oodenta Mitsuyo	Daisuke Namikawa	Kaiji Tang
Kogitsunemaru	Takashi Kondō	
Shokudaikiri Mitsutada	Takuya Satō	
Ookurikara	Makoto Furukawa	
Sakamoto Ryōma	Daisuke Ono	
Hijikata Toshizō	Tetsu Inada	
Ichimura Tetsunosuke	Haruki Ishiya	Tom Bauer

== Media ==
=== Manga ===
A manga version of the anime was serialized in Shueisha's Jump Square magazine from July 4 to December 4, 2017. It was then serialized in Jump Square website from January 4, 2018, to April 4, 2019. Shueisha collected its chapters in five tankōbon volumes, published from November 2017 to August 2019.

No.	Japanese release date	Japanese ISBN
1	November 2, 2017	978-4-08-881260-1
2	April 4, 2018	978-4-08-881386-8
3	September 4, 2018	978-4-08-881570-1
4	February 4, 2019	978-4-08-881730-9
5	August 2, 2019	978-4-08-882031-6

=== Anime ===
The series aired from July 1 to September 23, 2017. Aniplex of America licensed the anime series on April 14, 2017. At the end of the final episode, an anime theatrical film project was announced.

No.	Title	Original release date
1	"To the Frontlines"; Transliteration: "Shutsujin" (Japanese: 出陣)	July 1, 2017
2	"Commander"; Transliteration: "Butai chō" (Japanese: 部隊長)	July 8, 2017
3	"Master's Orders"; Transliteration: "Aruji no Inochi" (Japanese: 主の命)	July 15, 2017
4	"What I Wanted to Protect"; Transliteration: "Mamori takatta mono" (Japanese: 守りたかったもの)	July 22, 2017
5	"The Fires of War"; Transliteration: "Sen-ka" (Japanese: 戦火)	July 29, 2017
6	"The Citadel"; Transliteration: "Honmaru" (Japanese: 本丸)	August 5, 2017
7	"The First Unit"; Transliteration: "Dai ichi butai" (Japanese: 第一部隊)	August 12, 2017
8	"Protect History"; Transliteration: "Rekishi o mamoru" (Japanese: 歴史を守る)	August 19, 2017
9	"Former Master"; Transliteration: "Moto no Aruji" (Japanese: 元の主)	August 26, 2017
10	"Where Loyalty Leads"; Transliteration: "Chūgi no Mukau saki" (Japanese: 忠義の向かう先)	September 2, 2017
11	"Iron Law"; Transliteration: "Tetsu no Okite" (Japanese: 鉄の掟)	September 9, 2017
12	"Battle of Hakodate"; Transliteration: "Hakokan sensō" (Japanese: 箱館戦争)	September 16, 2017
13	"Katsugeki"; Transliteration: "Katsugeki" (Japanese: 活撃)	September 23, 2017
