= Touken Ranbu: Hanamaru =

Japanese anime

- Key visual

刀剣乱舞-花丸
- Genre: Action; Comedy; Historical fantasy
- Anime television series
- Directed by: Takashi Naoya
- Produced by: Jun Morita; Junnosuke Itō; OK Hazama; Takumi Ohama; Yoshiki Usa
- Written by: Pierre Sugiura
- Music by: Kenji Kawai
- Studio: Doga Kobo
- Licensed by: NA: Crunchyroll; SEA: Medialink
- Original network: Tokyo MX, KTV, BS11
- English network: SEA: ANIPLUS HD
- Original run: October 3, 2016 – December 19, 2016
- Episodes: 12
- Manga
- Written by: Saru Hoshino
- Published by: Shueisha
- Magazine: Shōnen Jump+
- Original run: December 9, 2016 – April 4, 2019
- Volumes: 5
- Anime film

Touken Ranbu: Hanamaru – Makuai Kaisōroku
- Studio: Doga Kobo
- Released: December 1, 2017
- Anime television series

Zoku Touken Ranbu: Hanamaru
- Directed by: Tomoaki Koshida
- Written by: WriteWorks
- Music by: Kenji Kawai
- Studio: Doga Kobo
- Licensed by: NA: Crunchyroll
- Original network: Tokyo MX, BS11, KTV
- Original run: January 7, 2018 – March 25, 2018
- Episodes: 12
- Anime film series

Toku Touken Ranbu Hanamaru Setsugetsuka
- Directed by: Takashi Naoya (film 1); Tomoaki Koshida (film 2); Sumie Noro (film 3)
- Written by: Yuki Nekota
- Music by: Kenji Kawai
- Studio: Doga Kobo
- Licensed by: Crunchyroll
- Released: May 20, 2022 – September 1, 2022
- Films: 3
- Manga

Touken Ranbu: Hanamaru – Setsugetsuka
- Written by: Saru Hoshino
- Published by: Shueisha
- Magazine: Shōnen Jump+
- Original run: May 24, 2023 – present
- Related anime
- Katsugeki/Touken Ranbu (spin-off)
- icon

Touken Ranbu Hanamaru (Japanese: 刀剣乱舞-花丸-) is a Japanese anime television series produced by Doga Kobo and Toho, directed by Takashi Naoya and written by Pierre Sugiura, with character designs by Junichiro Taniguchi and music composed by Kenji Kawai. It is based on the video game Touken Ranbu. A compilation film titled Touken Ranbu: Hanamaru – Makuai Kaisōroku premiered in December 2017. An anime film trilogy titled Toku Touken Ranbu: Hanamaru – Setsugetsuka premiered from May to September 2022.

== Plot ==
The year is 2205. The "historical retrograde army" have begun attacks on the past in their plot to change history. The Saniwa, who have been charged with protecting history, can imbue life into objects. Strongest among these are the Token Danshi, swordsmen who had originally lived as legendary swords. The story centers around their cheerful lives.

== Characters ==
=== Season 1 ===
Characters	Japanese	English
Yamatonokami Yasusada	Mitsuhiro Ichiki	Dallas Reid
Kashuu Kiyomitsu	Toshiki Masuda	Garret Storms
Heshikiri Hasebe	Tarusuke Shingaki	Aaron Roberts
Imanotsurugi	Daiki Yamashita	Anastasia Muñoz
Maeda Tōshirō	Reona Irie	Ryan Reynolds
Nikkari Aoe	Junji Majima	Robby Gemaehlich
Hachisuka Kotetsu	Kazuyuki Okitsu	Ian Sinclair
Mutsunokami Yoshiyuki	Kento Hama	Jason Liebrecht
Namazuo Tōshirō	Sōma Saitō	Rachel Robinson
Kasen Kanesada	Kaito Ishikawa	Oscar Seung
Sōza Samonji	Yūki Tai	J. Michael Tatum
Yagen Tōshirō	Seiichirō Yamashita	Derick Snow
Shokudaikiri Mitsutada	Takuya Satō	Marcus D. Stimac
Gokotai	Yuuta Kasuya	Leah Clark
Yamanbagiri Kunihiro	Tomoaki Maeno	Clifford Chapin
Shishiō	Ryōta Ōsaka	Blake Shepard
Ishikirimaru	Hidenori Takahashi	Justin Duncan
Akita Tōshirō	Yoshitaka Yamaya	Jad Saxton
Midare Tōshirō	Kazutomi Yamamoto	Alexis Tipton
Nakigitsune	Shintarō Asanuma	Alison Viktorin
Aizen Kunitoshi	Seiichirō Yamashita	Anthony Bowling
Dōdanuki Masakuni	Tooru Sakurai	Cris George
Tsurumaru Kuninaga	Sōma Saitō	Ricco Fajardo
Hirano Tōshirō	Ryōta Asari	Justin Briner
Honebami Tōshirō	Yūto Suzuki	Daman Mills
Atsushi Tōshirō	Daiki Yamashita	Brandon McInnis
Sayo Samonji	Ayumu Murase	Morgan Berry
Uguisumaru	Tetsuya Kakihara	Jerry Jewell
Horikawa Kunihiro	Junya Enoki	Justin Pate
Taroutachi	Yūki Tai	Kent Williams
Jirōtachi	Eiji Miyashita	Randy Pearlman
Izuminokami Kanesada	Ryōhei Kimura	Robert McCollum
Ookurikara	Makoto Furukawa	Chris Ryan
Mikazuki Munechika	Kōsuke Toriumi	Vic Mignogna
Hakata Tōshirō	Jun Oosuka	Austin Tindle
Yamabushi Kunihiro	Tooru Sakurai	Bryan Massey
Otegine	Kenji Hamada	Jarrod Greene
Kōsetsu Samonji	Takuya Satō	Blake McNamara
Urashima Kotetsu	Jun Fukushima	Stephen Sanders
Ichigo Hitofuri	Atsushi Tamaru	Josh Grelle
Tonbokiri	Tooru Sakurai	Chris Guerrero
Nihongō	Kenjiro Tsuda	Chris Rager
Kogitsunemaru	Takashi Kondō	Chuck Huber
Iwatooshi	Eiji Miyashita	Ian Ferguson
Hotarumaru	Yūichi Iguchi	Dawn M. Bennett
Akashi Kuniyuki	Ryōta Asari	Micah Solusod
Nagasone Kotetsu	Tarusuke Shingaki	Christopher Sabat
Okita Sōji	Daisuke Ono	Chris Cason

=== Season 2 ===
Characters	Japanese	English
Higekiri	Natsuki Hanae	Matt Shipman
Hizamaru	Nobuhiko Okamoto	Chris Wehkamp
Juzumaru Tsunetsugu	Hikaru Midorikawa	Aaron Dismuke
Taikogane Sadamune	Koji Takahashi	Alejandro Saab
Fudo Yukimitsu	Daisuke Sakaguchi	Kyle Igneczi
Kogarasumaru	Soichiro Hoshi	Greg Ayres
Odenta Mitsuyo	Daisuke Namikawa	Tyler Walker
Sohayanotsurugi Utsusunari	Ryota Asari	Kyle Phillips
Goto Toshirou	Taishi Murata	Stephen Fu
Shinano Toshirou	Yusuke Kobayashi	Chris Burnett
Monoyoshi Sadamune	Kensho Ono	Apphia Yu
Houchou Toushirou	Kouki Miyata	Megan Shipman
Konnosuke	Takuma Nagatsuka; Yuuki Shin	Sonny Strait
Sengo Muramasa	Junichi Suwabe	David Wald
Kikō Sadamune	Masahiro Yamanaka	Howard Wang
Ōkanehira	Yūki Ono	Jeremy Inman

== Media ==
=== Anime ===
The first season aired from October 3 to December 19, 2016. Funimation has licensed Touken Ranbu: Hanamaru for an English language release. A sequel was announced at the Hanamaru Biyori! special event in Japan on February 5, 2017. The second season aired from January to March 2018.

==== Season 1 (2016) ====
No. overall	No. in season	Title	Original release date
1	1	"January - Don't get cocky" "Mutsuki: Chōshi ni nonna" (睦月:ちょーしにのんな)	October 3, 2016
2	2	"February - There's nothing I want to say..." "Kisaragi: iitai koto nante ..., nani mo nai" (如月:言いたいことなんて。。。、何もない)	October 10, 2016
3	3	"March - It's one in ten thousand" "Yayoi: ichimanbun no ichi nan desu tte" (弥生: 一万分の一なんですって)	October 17, 2016
4	4	"April - What is strength?" "Uzuki: tsuyo sa tte, nan darō na" (卯月: 強さって、なんだろうな)	October 24, 2016
5	5	"May - Kindness is strength" "Satsuki: yasashii wa, tsuyoi" (皐月: 優しいは、強い)	October 31, 2016
6	6	"June - This citadel is joyous, isn't it?" "Minazuki: kono honmaru wa, medetai ne" (水無月: この本丸は、めでたいね)	November 7, 2016
7	7	"July - Caring for Someone" "Fumizuki: dare ka o omou shiawase" (文月: 誰かを想う幸せ)	November 14, 2016
8	8	"August - The Formation of the Ghost Extermination Rangers!" "Hazuki: yūrei taiji sentai, kessei!" (葉月: 幽霊退治戦隊、結成！)	November 21, 2016
9	9	"September - That's the Kind of Past I Have" "Nagatsuki: sono kako ga aru kara" (長月: その過去があるから)	November 28, 2016
10	10	"October - The Really Important Memories" "Kannazuki: hontōni daiji na omoide" (神無月: 本当に大事な思い出)	December 5, 2016
11	11	"November - A Stern Blow to Okita's Inheritance" "Shimotsuki: okita yuzuri no, saeta ichigeki" (霜月: 沖田譲りの、冴えた一撃)	December 12, 2016
12	12	"December - Our Citadel is the Hanamaru Today Too" "Shiwasu: bokutachi no honmaru wa, kyō mo hanamaru" (師走: 僕たちの本丸は、今日も花丸)	December 19, 2016

==== Season 2 (2018) ====
No. overall	No. in season	Title	Original release date
1	13	"January - I Must Get Stronger" "Mutsuki: tsuyoku naranakya" (睦月：強くならなきゃ)	January 7, 2018
2	14	"February - I Wish Tomorrow Will Be a Good Day, Too" "Kisaragi: asu mo ī hi ni narimasu yō ni" (如月: 明日もいい日になりますように)	January 14, 2018
3	15	"March - I Will Not Lose" "Yayoi: zettai make nei!" (弥生: 絶対負けねーッ!)	January 21, 2018
4	16	"April - Because You're Our Comrade in This Citadel" "Uzuki: Kono honmaru no naka da kara da" (卯月: この本丸の仲だからだ)	January 28, 2018
5	17	"May - What I Can Do Because I'm Me" "Satsuki: ore da kara, dekiru koto" (皐月: 俺だから、できること)	February 4, 2018
6	18	"June - We're Counting on You from Now On, Too" "Minazuki: kore kara mo yoroshiku" (水無月: これからもよろしく)	February 11, 2018
7	19	"July - Now, It's Do-Or-Die" "Fumizuki: iza, ō shōbu" (文月: いざ、大勝負)	February 18, 2018
8	20	"August - So Let's Keep This a Secret, Okay?" "Hazuki: kono koto wa himitsu da kara na" (葉月: このことは秘密だからな)	February 25, 2018
9	21	"September - Sometimes It's Nice..." "Nagatsuki: tama ni wa ī desu ne..." (長月: たまにはいいですね...)	March 4, 2018
10	22	"October - See, It's Fine, Right?" "Kaminazuki: ne, daijōbu deshō" (神無月: ね、大丈夫でしょう)	March 11, 2018
11	23	"November - I'm Counting on You" "Shimotsuki: kitai shite iru yo" (霜月: 期待しているよ)	March 18, 2018
12	24	"December - Stories of Hanamaru Days" "Shiwasu: hanamaru na hibi no monogatari" (師走: 花丸な日々の物語)	March 25, 2018

=== Manga ===
A manga adaptation of the television series illustrated by Saru Hoshino was serialized on the Shōnen Jump+ website and app between December 9, 2016, and April 4, 2019.

A manga adaptation of the Setsugetsuka films illustrated again by Saru Hoshino began serialization on the same platform on May 24, 2023.

=== Films ===
Before the airing of the second season, a compilation film titled Touken Ranbu Hanamaru Makuai Kaisōroku premiered in Japanese theaters on December 1, 2017.

During the "Touken Ranbu: Hanamaru Special Event: Hanamaru Haru Ichiban!", it was announced that the series is receiving a new film trilogy titled Toku Touken Ranbu Hanamaru Setsugetsuka. The first film, Yuki no Maki premiered on May 20, 2022, the second film, Tsuki no Maki premiered on July 8, 2022, and the third film, Hana no Maki premiered on September 1, 2022.

Crunchyroll will stream all of its movies on May 15, 2025.
