= UniteUp! =

Japanese media franchise

- Anime key visual
- Genre: Musical
- Created by: Sony Music Entertainment Japan
- Anime television series
- Directed by: Shinichiro Ushijima
- Written by: Rino Yamazaki
- Music by: Yuki Hayashi
- Studio: CloverWorks
- Licensed by: NA: Aniplex of America; SA/SEA: Muse Communication
- Original network: Tokyo MX, GYT, GTV, BS11, HTB, MBS, FBS, Mētele
- Original run: January 7, 2023 – April 15, 2023
- Episodes: 12
- Anime television series

UniteUp! -Uni:Birth-
- Directed by: Shinichiro Ushijima
- Written by: Rino Yamazaki
- Music by: Yuki Hayashi
- Studio: CloverWorks
- Licensed by: NA: Aniplex of America; SA/SEA: Muse Communication
- Original network: Tokyo MX, GYT, GTV, BS11, HTB, MBS, FBS, Mētele
- Original run: January 11, 2025 – April 5, 2025
- Episodes: 12

UniteUp! is a multi-dimensional idol franchise presented by Sony Music Entertainment Japan. It started with a YouTube channel created in November 2021, with songs from various artists released in the channel. An anime television series by CloverWorks ran from January to April 2023. A second season, titled UniteUp! Uni: Birth, ran from January to April 2025.

== Characters ==
=== Protostar ===
Akira Kiyose (清瀬明良, Kiyose Akira)
Voiced by: Kikunosuke Toya
Banri Naoe (直江万里, Naoe Banri)
Voiced by: Ryōtarō Yamaguchi
Chihiro Isuzugawa (五十鈴川千紘, Isuzugawa Chihiro)
Voiced by: Amon Hirai

=== Legit ===
Daiki Takao (高尾大毅, Takao Daiki)
Voiced by: Magura Sukegawa
Eishiro Nijo (二条瑛士郎, Nijō Eishirō)
Voiced by: Shinnosuke Morikage
Fuga Togo (東郷楓雅, Tōgō Fūga)
Voiced by: Ryūichirō Sakata

=== Jaxx/Jaxx ===
Gakuto Haruka (春賀楽翔, Haruka Gakuto)
Voiced by: Masa
Homare Katsura (桂ほまれ, Katsura Homare)
Voiced by: Yūki Shimomae
Izumi Kashii (香椎一澄, Kashii Izumi)
Voiced by: Takumi Magoshi
Jun Wakasa (若桜潤, Wakasa Jun)
Voiced by: Kōsei Tsubokura
Kanata Morinomiya (森ノ宮奏太, Morinomiya Kanata)
Voiced by: Gaku Takumoto

=== AneLa ===
Lin Otsuki (大月凛, Ōtsuki Rin)
Voiced by: Soma Saito
Maoto Tsujido (辻堂真音, Tsujidō Maoto)
Voiced by: Yoshiki Nakajima

== Media ==
As of 2026, the UniteUp! anime television series is distributed internationally by Aniplex of America in North America with the series streaming on the Crunchyroll service and Muse Communication in Southeast Asia and Pacific.

The anime was announced during the Aniplex Online Fest 2022 event on September 24, 2022, and produced by CloverWorks. It is directed by Shinichiro Ushijima, with Rino Yamazaki overseeing series scripts, Majiro designing the characters and serving as chief animation director alongside Asami Komatsu and Yurie Hama, as well as Yuki Hayashi composing the music. The anime aired from January 7 to April 15, 2023, on Tokyo MX and other networks. On January 21, it was announced that Episode 4 would be delayed until February 11 due to the COVID-19 pandemic.

On July 30, 2023, a second season was announced. Titled UniteUp! Uni: Birth, it aired from January 11 to April 5, 2025.
