= Collar × Malice =

2016 video game

- North American PlayStation Vita cover art
- Developer: Idea Factory
- Publishers: JP: Idea Factory; WW: Aksys Games
- Directors: Hiroaki Yoshida; Aya Motegi
- Producer: Reiko Shima
- Artist: Mai Hanamura
- Writers: Sachi Arino; Shinobu Iwata; Yuki Sahara
- Composer: Manyo
- Platforms: PlayStation Vita, Nintendo Switch
- Release: PlayStation Vita: JP: August 18, 2016; WW: July 28, 2017; Nintendo Switch: JP: March 12, 2020; WW: June 25, 2020
- Genre: Visual novel
- Mode: Single-player

Collar × Malice is a visual novel video game developed and published by Idea Factory under their Otomate brand. It was released for PlayStation Vita on August 18, 2016, in Japan, and by Aksys Games in North America and Europe on July 28, 2017. A Nintendo Switch port was also released in 2020. The game was well received by critics, and sold well in Japan for a niche game of its genre and platform. A fan disc, Collar × Malice: Unlimited, was released on July 26, 2018. A two-part anime film adaptation by Studio Deen, titled Gekijōban Collar × Malice Deep Cover, premiered in May and June 2023.

== Synopsis ==
Collar × Malice follows a rookie police officer Ichika Hoshino stationed in Shinjuku, Tokyo. On her way home from work, she is attacked and a collar with poison is placed around her neck; following this, she becomes involved with the "X-Day Incident", a string of murders done by a terrorist group called Adonis. Under the threat of death, Ichika is forced to investigate the X-Day Incident together with a group of former police officers.

== Characters ==
=== Main ===
Ichika Hoshino (星野 市香, Hoshino Ichika)
Voiced by: Kaede Hondo
Ichika is a rookie police officer working in the Special Regions Crime Prevention Office (SRCPO). While still new with her job, her awareness of her own lack of experience drives her to learn and when she puts her mind into it, she is capable to come to at a quick pace. She has a strong sense of justice and want to protect not only the people around her, but also the people of Shinjuku who are being quarantined. She decided to become a police officer when she received gratitude after she returned a lost wallet to its owner when she was in middle-school. Despite not excelling in anything particular, her idea of justice gained the attention of Adonis leader, Zero, who considers her as a sympathizer. This resulted with her being collared as an experiment whether Ichika is truly worthy to become an Adonis member or not.

Aiji Yanagi (柳 愛時, Yanagi Aiji)
Voiced by: Masakazu Morita
He is a former cop who used to work in the Investigations Section 1 unit, but quit to pursue the X-Day Incident in his own way. Mature and thoughtful, Yanagi is the reliable leader of the group. His tendency to look out for his friends and excelling in housework made people considers him as the "Father" of the detective agency. Behind his seemingly perfect disposition, Yanagi is actually haunted by his past; when he was in high-school, he almost killed a kidnapper and rendered him in vegetative state. Driven by guilt, Yanagi became a police officer and regularly visits the comatose kidnapper.

Kei Okazaki (岡崎 契, Okazaki Kei)
Voiced by: Yuki Kaji
He is a Special Police (SP) officer in charge of protecting Yanagi and his group. He is overly friendly and never stops in trying to get along with Yanagi's group, and eventually Ichika, in spite of their wariness, giving people impression that he's an air-head. He has unusual tastes in foods and has a habit of sleeping anywhere he likes regardless of the place and time. However, when his duty calls for him, Okazaki will prioritizes the safety of the person he's protecting above all else even if it means sacrificing his own life or overlooking other casualties to fulfil it. He has a deep-seethed desire to die a meaningful death after his coworker died protecting him. From then on, he seeks someone worthy of his protection that he would willingly give his life for.

Mineo Enomoto (榎本 峰雄, Enomoto Mineo)
Voiced by: Soma Saito
He is a former cop who used to work in Field Ops Team 2. He is a huge fan of Japanese history, particularly Date Masamune, to the point of wearing an eye-patch to honor him. Impulsive and rarely thinks first before speaking as well as having little experience with women, Mineo is the source of comical relief for most of the game. When he was still working in Field Ops, he was close with a senior officer who became the foundation of his justice. He was crushed when his senior was kidnapped and killed by Adonis, even more so upon finding out he made a mistaken arrest out of desperation to get promoted. This led Mineo to quit the police force and joined Yanagi's group.

Takeru Sasazuka (笹塚 尊, Sasazuka Takeru)
Voiced by: Daisuke Namikawa
He is a former cop who used to work in Cyber Crime Division. An exceptionally smart and skilled hacker, Sasazuka is blunt when speaking to people without regards of how they'll feel. He would ruthlessly criticise anyone he deems as "idiot", Mineo more than often being the target of his insult. Behind his harsh exterior, Sasazuka won't recklessly put people's life at risk. He despise guns after his mother was killed by a gangster and moved to Japan due to its strict Sword and Firearms Control Law. However, when the government repeal the law that allows citizens of Shinjuku to carry guns, Sasazuka quit and joined Yanagi to solve the X-Day Incidents in hope of restoring the Sword and Firearms Control Law.

Kageyuki Shiraishi (白石 景之, Shiraishi Kageyuki)
Voiced by: Ryōhei Kimura
He is the director of the Field Ops department and works in the Crime Lab as a profiler. He is infamous amongst the police force for his eccentricities, particularly his fondness for cat goods. He tends to speak his mind and act without caring about how other people would feel as long as it's for his amusement or if it'll answer his curiosity. As the result, many people dislike him, mainly Mukai and Sakuragawa. At the same time, Shiraishi is begrudgingly respected for his accurate profiling skill that have helped the police solving many cases.

=== Supporting ===
Kazuki Hoshino (星野 香月, Hoshino Kazuki)
He is Ichika's younger brother. Since he was little, Kazuki excels at everything he did, causing his parents to favor him more than Ichika and placed their expectation on him to succeed their family business. The expectations caused Kazuki's relationship with Ichika to sour as they grew up, partially due to his jealousy that Ichika get to work the job she chose herself. As the result, Kazuki is often cold to Ichika, believing that she doesn't care about his dream of becoming a musician. However, Kazuki actually still cares for his sister, only refusing to openly show his affection due to their estranged relationship.

Hideaki Yoshinari (吉成 秀明, Yoshinari Hideaki)
He is a junior SP officer partnered with Okazaki in their task to observe and report Yanagi's team's activities to the police. While bright and friendly, he often becomes an annoyance to Yanagi's team because of his habit of speaking what crosses his mind without thinking further. This habit usually leads to Okazaki punishing him, which is a running-gag throughout Okazaki's route. Despite his clumsiness, he is a capable SP officer and often being entrusted with Ichika and Kazuki's safety when Okazaki is not available.

Yuzuru Saeki (冴木 弓弦, Saeki Yuzuru)
He is an officer of police box and Ichika's close friend since their times at Police Academy. He often becomes Ichika's drinking buddy, and their close relationship makes their coworkers mistaking them as a couple. He claims that he chose to become a police because he wants to make people happy and conduct his own sense of justice.

Masanobu Mochida (望田 政信, Mochida Masanobu)
He is Ichika's superior at SCRPO Division. Despite his position, he's secretly conducting his own investigation on the X-Day Incidents due to his frustration of the lack of information the SCRPO gained. Misunderstanding Ichika's pursuit of the case as aiming to promote into Division 1, Mochida supports Ichika's personal investigation, often giving her excuses so she can go investigate without being suspected and covers for her should something happens.

Kotoho Sakuragawa (桜川 寿, Sakuragawa Kotoho)
She is an officer from Forensic Department. She is an acquaintance of Sasazuka and secretly leaked police information to Yanagi's team, and later befriends Ichika. She is a huge meat lovers to the point she's easily swayed by Sasazuka into helping his investigation by promising to treat her meat. She is also a friend of Mukai, both formed the Shiraishi Bashing Coalition due to their mutual hatred for Shiraishi.

Eriko Mukai (向井 絵里子, Mukai Eriko)
She is Shiraishi's subordinate who bears both begrudging respect and intense hatred for her said superior for all the works he casually dumped on her. She is friend with Sakuragawa, and together they formed the Shiraishi Bashing Coalition due to their shared hatred for the profiler.

Yasuhiro Isshiki (一色 康弘, Isshiki Yasuhiro)
He is a famous singer and a friend of Kazuki who recruited him into his band. Before the story, he was falsely arrested when he tried to stop a man from committing suicide by being hit by train, only to be mistaken as him pushing the man on purpose. Even though his innocence was later proven, the incident ruined his career. Isshiki decided to start from scratch, eventually rebuilding his career. He became friends with Akito and Kazuki, recruiting the latter to join his band as guitarist.

Seiji Minegishi (峰岸 誠司, Minegishi Seiji)
He is the director of the Investigations Unit of the Metropolitan Police Department. He used to be Sasazuka's superior.

Hajime Morioka (森丘 創, Morioka Hajime)
He is the chief of the Metropolitan Police Department Investigation Unit 1.

Yusaku Takaeda (鷹枝 勇作, Takaeda Yusaku)
He is a police commander who has the most authority within the Shinjuku Police.

=== Antagonists ===
Zero (ゼロ, Zero)
He is the leader of Adonis. His true identity is unknown to other Adonis members other than exceptionally high-ranked member such as Mikuni. When contacting his underlings, he usually speaks through communication devices while obscuring his real voice. He has an extremist view in how criminals should be judged, believing that the world would be free from suffering only if all evils are eliminated. He takes interest in Ichika's sense of justice, and thus, decided to collar her as a test to see if she's worthy to become a member of Adonis.

Rei Mikuni (御國 れい, Mikuni Rei)
He is a politician who is also the son of the current Prime Minister and the co-leader of Adonis. His mother belonged to a cult, which became the foundation of Adonis. Disillusioned by his parents' way, Mikuni took the mantel of Adonis after his mother's death to make Japan a country without suffering. He approached Zero, who was actually his half-brother from different mother, and placed him as Adonis' top leader as he believed they shared the same goal.

Keisuke Sanjou (山条 圭介, Sanjō Keisuke)
He is the second executor of X-Days Incident. He used to be a cop with strong sense of justice and dedicated himself to his work for the sake of people. However, he faced abuse at the hands of his superior who took credits all of Sanjo and his fellow officers' hardwork as his own work to get promoted. For some time, Sanjou endured the abuse, believing that his actions still saved a lot people. He broke down after his superior's careleness resulted with the death of an innocent bystander and Sanjou was forced to take the blame of the accident. Losing faith in the police as a whole, Sanjou became nihilistic and joined Adonis to get his revenge and wish for the destruction of the dirty world.

Shion Uno & Suzune Uno (宇野 詩音 & 宇野 鈴音, Uno Shion & Uno Suzune)
They are 18-years-old twin siblings who became the third and fourth executors of Adonis. Shion and Suzune were born in a normal happy family until their mother suffered a mental breakdown that led to her attempting to kill them. They survived because their father protected them from their mother at the cost of his own life, and shortly after their mother killed herself. Since then, they were taken by relatives who only treated them as children of a murderer. The only person who was kind to them was their mother's close friend. The severe trauma from the incident and ostracization by their peers caused Suzune to develop a dissociative identity disorder. Knowing his sister's unstable condition, Shion suggested Suzune to start a diary so she won't forget whenever her alternate personality takes over. After learning that their mother's breakdown was due to the abuse she suffered by her students, Shion and Suzune joined Adonis to exact vengeance.

Manabu Soda (相田 学, Sōda Manabu)
He is the fifth executor of X-Days Incident. A shut-in who was severely bullied at school, Soda found solace in online gaming where he could become a strong person and saved weak people who viewed him as their god. He stopped going to school and spent most of his times playing online game in his room, secluded from the outside world. Shortly before the X-Day Incident, he again became a victim of bullying online after a bug interfered with his avatar in game and the other players blamed him for their lost.

Rika Sugawara (菅原 理香, Sugawara Rika)
She is the sixth executor of X-Days Incident. She was a victim of stalking, being stalked twice by two different men who terrorized her by sending pictures and mails that tells her everyday activities. She already made report to the police, but her plea was ignored as the stalkers have yet to do anything to her. She became resentful of men and lost faith in God as no one was willing to help her. Ironically, when Zero recruited her into Adonis, Rika became obsessed with Zero, considering him as her God and developed twisted love for him the same way her stalkers were.

Akito Sera (瀬良 あきと, Sera Akito)
He is the seventh executor of X-Days Incident. He is Kazuki's best friend and also a close friend of Isshiki whom he composed songs for. He had a younger sister named Kanade who was bullied by her whole class to the point of suicide. Feeling guilty for not trying to listen to her plea, Akito purposely hid an evidence that named the ones who bullied her so he could take revenge himself. His experience with his sister made Akito sympathized with Kazuki and Ichika's situation, urging Ichika to try to understand Kazuki so she won't make the same mistake as he did with his sister.

Hanako Kobayashi (小林 花子, Kobayashi Hanako)
She is the eighth executor of X-Days Incident. She is die-hard fan of Isshiki who prefers to call herself as "Hana". Despite her young appearance, she's the same age as Ichika. She likes to follow Kazuki or secretly barging into the backstage where Isshiki usually practices with his band in hope of getting closer to her idol, much to Kazuki and Isshiki's annoyance. Enraged by Isshiki's false arrest that ruined his career, Hana joined Adonis to enact revenge in Isshiki's name.

Tomoki Ogata (緒方 智樹, Ogata Tomoki)
He is the ninth executor of X-Days Incident. He was a social worker with great sense of justice, but got falsely arrested when he tried to help Isshiki from being harassed by a suicidal man. He was pressured into making a false confession, which caused him to get fired from his job and his family leaving him. Closing to lose his sense of justice, he joined Adonis who convinced him to exact his own justice and punish the true sinners.

Shu Kurose (黒瀬 集, Kurose Shū)
A character introduced in Unlimited fan disc. He is one of Adonis "dolls" and Mikuni's loyal follower. He was born and grew up in one of Adonis' experimental facility that nurtured children to become a loyal follower of Adonis' cause. During his time as a "doll", he developed a one-sided rivalry against another child dubs No. 14, whom he was jealous of for getting Mikuni's attention.

=== Others ===
Mitsuru Sowa (拾和 ミツル, Sowa Mitsuru)
Voiced by: Katsuyuki Konishi

He is a new character that exclusively appears in the Deep Cover movie. He is assigned to assist in the X-Days crimes and has an unknown history with Yanagi.

== Development and release ==
The game was developed by Idea Factory, as part of their Otomate brand of otome games. It was announced along with twelve other otome games during the annual Otomate Party event in August 2015, and was released in Japan on August 18, 2016, for PlayStation Vita. To promote the game, merchandise based on it was released prior to the game's launch, including audio dramas and a tapestry with a Collar × Malice illustration.

At Anime Expo 2016, Aksys Games announced that they would localize the game and release it in North America in 2017; in April 2017 they announced that it would also be released in Europe, and be available both digitally and physically. It was released on July 28, 2017, in North America and Europe. A fan disc, Collar × Malice: Unlimited, was released in Japan in 2018. Both the original game and Unlimited are planned to get released for the Nintendo Switch in North America and Europe with the original planned for release on June 25, 2020, and August 2020 respectively.

== Reception ==
Reception

Aggregate score
Aggregator	Score
Metacritic	74/100

Review score
Publication	Score
Famitsu	33/40

Collar × Malice's sales numbers for its debut week differ between different sales charts: Media Create reported that it was the eleventh best selling video game of the week with 7,271 copies sold, while Famitsu reported that it was the eight best selling with 9,406 copies sold. Siliconera described the Japanese opening week sales as good for a PlayStation Vita visual novel for a niche audience.

The game received "mixed or average reviews", according to the review aggregator website Metacritic. Famitsu's reviewers praised the graphics and character art, and enjoyed the player character's developing relationships with the other characters. One of them liked the suspense, commenting that it is rarely used in otome games.

== Related media ==
- Gekijōban Collar × Malice Deep Cover

劇場版 Collar×Malice -deep cover-
- Anime film series
- Directed by: Hiroshi Watanabe
- Written by: Sayaka Harada
- Music by: Masaru Yokoyama
- Studio: Studio Deen
- Released: May 26, 2023 – June 23, 2023
- Runtime: 52 minutes
- Films: 2

An anime adaptation was announced on June 3, 2019. It was later revealed to be a two-part film, titled Gekijōban Collar × Malice Deep Cover, produced by Studio Deen and distributed by Avex Pictures. It is directed by Hiroshi Watanabe and written by Sayaka Harada, with Yukiko Ban adapting Mai Hanamura's original designs for animation, and Masaru Yokoyama composing the music at Avex Pictures. Avex Pictures is also distributing the film. The first film premiered on May 26, 2023, and the second film screened on June 23 of the same year. The theme song is "Ningen × Shikkaku (人間×失格; "No Longer × Human") by Kizu.
