= Amon Hirai =

Japanese model and actor (born 1995)

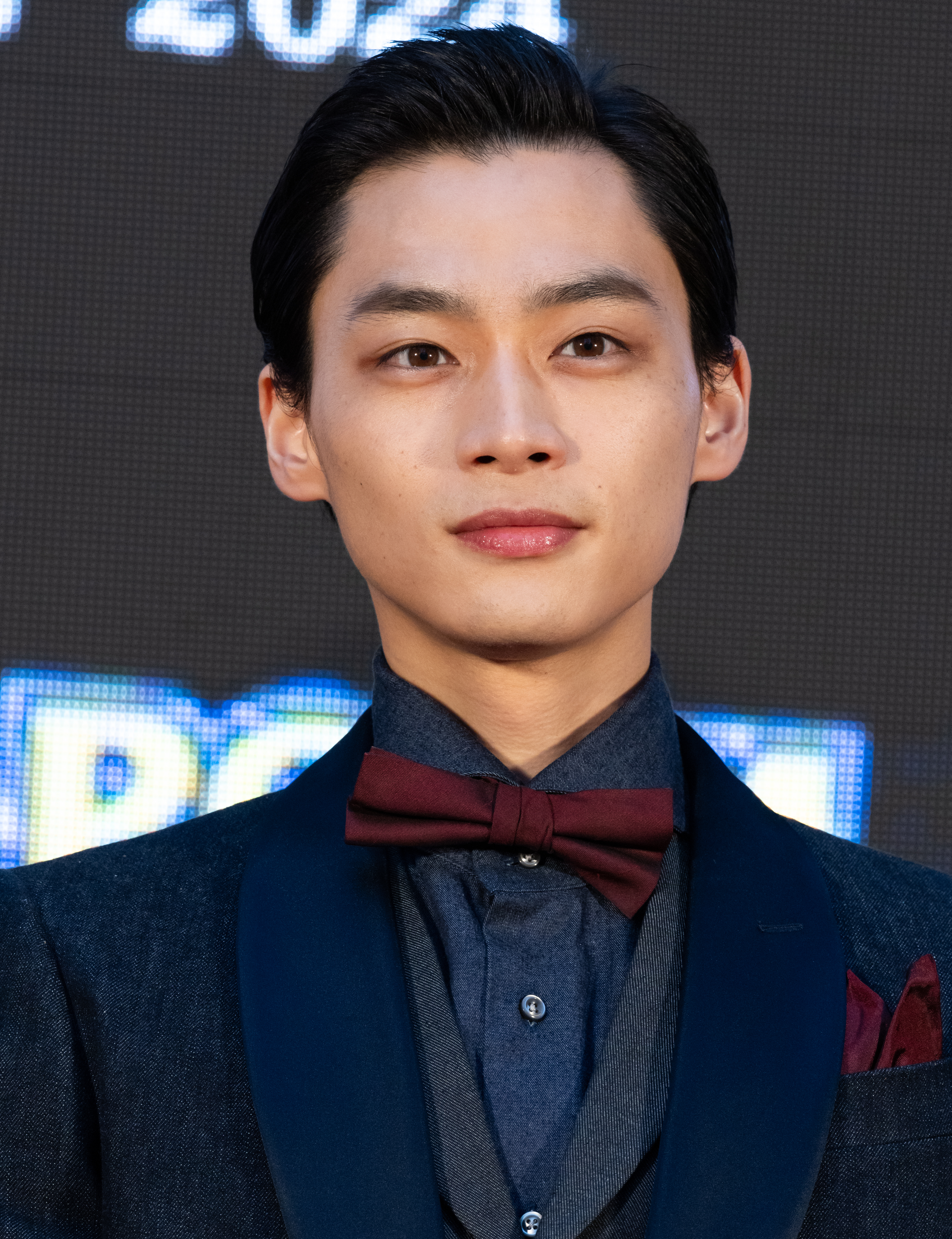
- Hirai at the 37th Tokyo International Film Festival in 2024
- Born: July 28, 1995 (age 30); Mie Prefecture, Japan
- Occupations: Model; actor
- Years active: 2017–present
- Agent: Sony Music Artists Inc.
- Modeling information
- Height: 175 cm (5 ft 9 in)
- Hair color: black
- Eye color: brown

Japanese name
- Kanji: 平井 亜門
- Hiragana: ひらい あもん
Transcriptions
- Romanization: Hirai Amano

Amon Hirai (平井 亜門, Hirai Amon; born July 28, 1995) is a Japanese model and actor.

== Career ==
At the 37th Tokyo International Film Festival in 2024, the film Missing Child Videotape, in which he appeared, won the Asian Future award.

== Filmography ==
=== Film ===
Year	Title	Role	Notes	Ref(s)
2017	My Boy in Blue	Cameo		
2018	36.8℃	Masashi Katsuragi		
2019	Reborn			
2019	Goodbye	Keita Iino		
2021	On the Edge of Their Seats	Fujino Fujino		
2021	A Girl on the Shore	Katsutoshi Otsu		
2021	Situational Love	Ray	Lead role	
2022	There Is a Landing At the top of the Stairs	Senior student		
2022	Hotobori Meltsounds	Yamada		
2022	The Two of Us on the Kanda River	Tomoki Ono	Lead role	
2023	Thorns of Love			
2023	Ginpei-cho Cinema Blues	Ryotaro Takasugi		
2023	The Corpse			
2023	Living in the Gap, Spring			
2023	Kataomoi			
2023	I'll See You Again	Maruo	Lead role	
2023	Almost People	Fujishiro		
2023	The Night Before			
2023	Moon and Goldfish		Lead role	
2025	Missing Child: Videotape	Tsukasa Amano		
2025	Love Brain Experiment	Shota Saeki		
2025	In the Case of Kanako Saotome			
2025	Perfect Share House			
2025	Yoyogi Johnny's Melancholy After School	Takahashi		
2026	Grim Reaper Barber	Shogo		

=== Television ===
Year	Title	Role	Notes	Ref(s)
2016	The Girl's Speech		Episode 9	
2017	Medical Team Lady Da Vinci's Diagnosis		Episode 5	
2020	Spotlight		Episode 4	
2021	The Ideal Man	Saiga	Episode 2 and 8	
2022	The Supernatural Master Tape: Eye		Episode 1	
2022	Metropolitan Police Department, First Investigation Division Chief	Yuji Naruo	Season 6; Episodes 1, 2, 5, and 10	
2022	Sawako: That is Endless Revenge	Nono Igarashi		
2023	Obsessive Fangirl Horror	Mitsukuri		
2023	UniteUp!	Chihiro Isuzugawa (voice)	TV anime	
2023	This Hamburger is Missing The Pickles		Lead role	
2023	Even If I Forget You	Mitsuru Higuchi		
2023	Hissatsu Shigotonin	Rokunosuke		
2024	First Love Affair: Can I Call This Love My First Love?	Fumiaki Chikahiro		
2025	UniteUp! -Uni:Birth-	Chihiro Isuzugawa (voice)	TV anime	
2025	10 Things I Want to Do Before I Turn 40	Hayate Tanaka		
