= Obsessive Fangirl Horror =

Japanese manga series

- Obsessive Fangirl Horror: I Want to Be That Streamer's Girlfriend
- First tankōbon volume cover (Coamix edition)

ガチ恋粘着獣 ～ネット配信者の彼女になりたくて～ (Gachi Koi Nenchaku-jū: Net Haishin-sha no Kanojo ni Naritakute)
- Genre: Mystery; Romance; Suspense
- Manga
- Written by: Seira
- Published by: Takeshobo (1–6); Coamix
- English publisher: NA: MangaPlaza
- Imprint: Bamboo Comics Tatan (1–6); Zenon Comics
- Magazine: Comic Tatan
- Original run: March 13, 2020 – February 28, 2025
- Volumes: 16
- Television drama
- Studio: ABC Television
- Original network: ABC TV, TV Asahi
- Original run: April 9, 2023 – June 11, 2023
- Episodes: 10
- icon

Obsessive Fangirl Horror: I Want to Be That Streamer's Girlfriend (ガチ恋粘着獣 ～ネット配信者の彼女になりたくて～, Gachi Koi Nenchaku-jū: Net Haishin-sha no Kanojo ni Naritakute) is a Japanese manga series written and illustrated by Seira. It was serialized on Coamix's Comic Tatan website from March 2020 to February 2025. A live-action television drama adaptation aired from April 2023.

== Synopsis ==
Kaguya Hinaki is a female college student who is highly regarded by her classmates due to her attractive appearance. However, she had a secret she couldn't tell anyone: she was obsessively in love with Subaru, one of the members of Cosmic, a popular online streaming group. One day, a message from an unknown account comes to Hinaki via social media, who wishes to be able to date Subaru, and will answer her intense passion and lead her life to change completely.

== Media ==
=== Manga ===
Written and illustrated by Seira, Obsessive Fangirl Horror: I Want to Be That Streamer's Girlfriend was serialized on Coamix's Comic Tatan website from March 13, 2020, to February 28, 2025. The series' chapters were collected into six volumes originally released by Takeshobo from August 20, 2020, to December 20, 2021. Coamix later began releasing new volumes from April 20, 2022, with reprints of the previous six released on April 1. Sixteen tankōbon volumes were released up until August 20, 2025.

No.	Release date	ISBN
1	August 20, 2020	978-4-80-197055-7 (original); 978-4-86-720342-2 (reprint)
2	April 20, 2021	978-4-80-197069-4 (original); 978-4-86-720343-9 (reprint)
3	June 18, 2021	978-4-80-197341-1 (original); 978-4-86-720344-6 (reprint)
4	September 18, 2021	978-4-80-197436-4 (original); 978-4-86-720345-3 (reprint)
5	September 18, 2021	978-4-80-197437-1 (original); 978-4-86-720346-0 (reprint)
6	December 20, 2021	978-4-80-197544-6 (original); 978-4-86-720347-7 (reprint)
7	April 20, 2022	978-4-86-720367-5
8	August 20, 2022	978-4-86-720413-9
9	January 20, 2023	978-4-86-720367-5
10	March 20, 2023	978-4-86-720488-7; 978-4-86-720489-4 (LE)
11	August 19, 2023	978-4-86-720559-4; 978-4-86-720560-0 (LE)
12	December 20, 2023	978-4-86-720600-3; 978-4-86-720601-0 (LE)
13	April 19, 2024	978-4-86-720641-6
14	August 20, 2024	978-4-86-720682-9
15	December 20, 2024	978-4-86-720717-8
16	August 20, 2025	978-4-86-720772-7

=== Drama ===
A 10-episode live-action television drama adaptation was announced in January 2023. It aired on ABC TV and TV Asahi from April 9 to June 11, 2023.
