= Kazumasa Hirai =

Kazumasa Hirai is the name of:

- Kazumasa Hirai (author) (1938–2015), novelist
- Kazumasa Hirai (weightlifter) (born 1949), Olympic bronze medalist
