= Moshi Moshi, Terumi Desu =

Japanese manga series

- Cover of Moshi Moshi, Terumi Desu volume 1 by Shogakukan

もしもし、てるみです。
- Genre: Romantic comedy
- Manga
- Written by: Etsuko Mizusawa
- Published by: Shogakukan
- Magazine: Big Comic Spirits
- Original run: March 2016 – February 2018
- Volumes: 2
- Original net animation
- Studio: Production I.G
- Released: June 8, 2018

Moshi Moshi, Terumi Desu (もしもし、てるみです。; lit. 'Hello, This is Terumi') is a Japanese manga series by Etsuko Mizusawa. It was serialized in Shogakukan's seinen manga magazine Big Comic Spirits between March 2016 and February 2018 and has been collected in two tankōbon volumes. An original net animation adaptation premiered on Production I.G's Anime Beans app on June 8, 2018.

== Characters ==
Terumi (てるみ)
Voiced by: Maaya Uchida
Rintarō (鈴太郎)
Voiced by: Kōtarō Nishiyama

== Media ==
=== Manga ===
Moshi Moshi, Terumi Desu was written and illustrated by Etsuko Mizusawa. The manga began serialization in Shogakukan's Big Comic Spirits magazine in March 2016, and it ended in February 2018. The series was compiled in two tankōbon volumes, released between October 12, 2017, and June 12, 2018.

=== Anime ===
An anime adaptation was announced in the 10th issue of Big Comic Spirits on February 5, 2018, later revealed to be an original net animation (ONA). The series premiered on Production I.G's streaming app Anime Beans on June 8, 2018.
