= Yuki Kaji =

Japanese actor (born 1985)

- 梶 裕貴
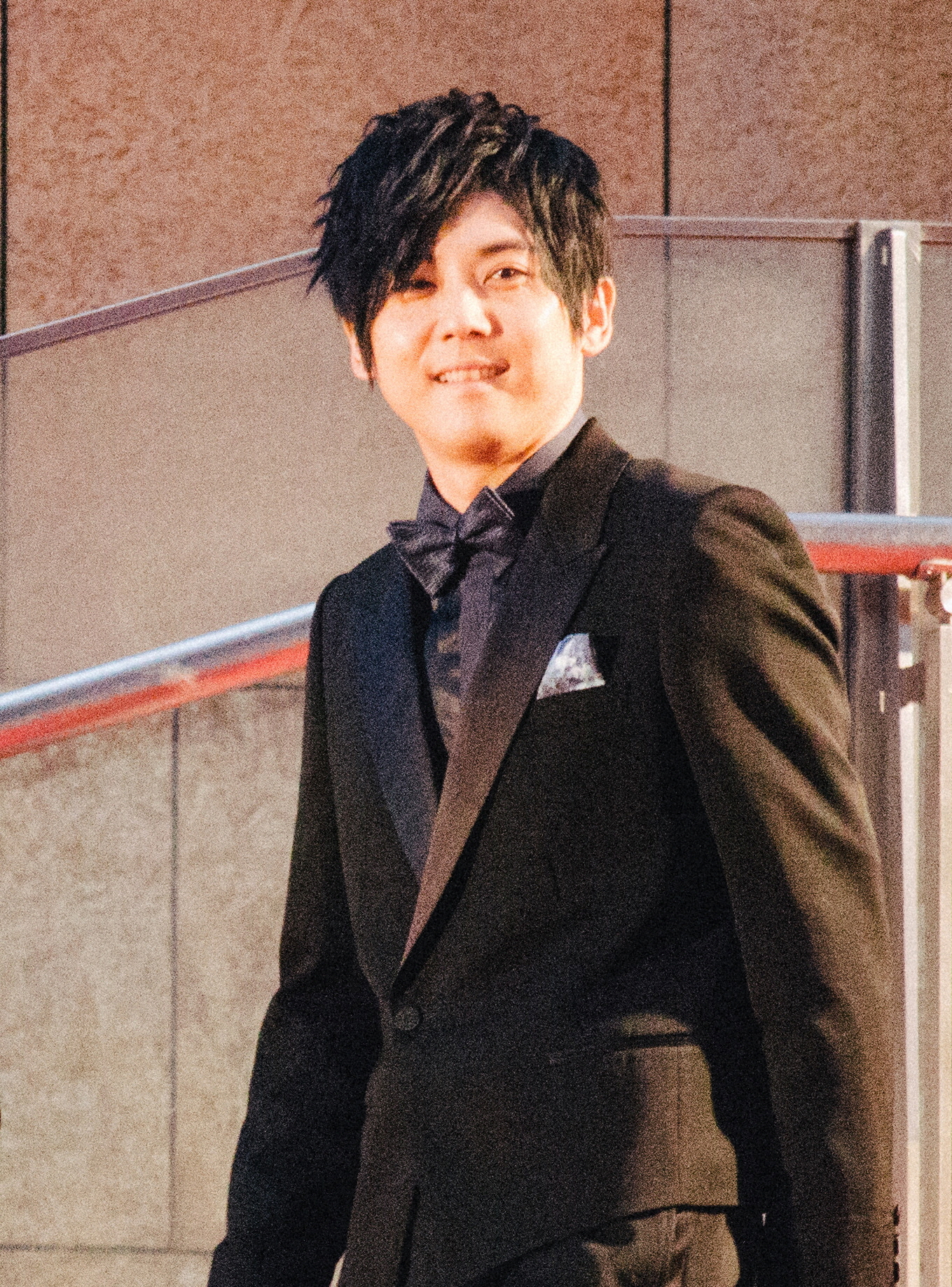
- Kaji at the 2014 Tokyo International Film Festival
- Born: September 3, 1985 (age 41); Tokyo, Japan
- Occupations: Actor; voice actor; singer
- Years active: 2004–present
- Agent: Fractal
- Spouse: Ayana Taketatsu (m. 2019)
- Children: 1

Yuki Kaji (梶 裕貴, Kaji Yūki; born September 3, 1985) is a Japanese actor, voice actor and singer.

== Biography ==
He was part of the four-unit singing group G.Addict, which was part of the Goulart Knights project, He has hosted the web radio show Yuki Kaji's Monologue (梶裕貴のひとりごと, Kaji Yūki no Hitorigoto) since April 13, 2014. His variety show Kaji 100!: The 100 Things Yuki Kaji Wants to Do debuted on the Nitteleplus channel in April 2017.

== Personal life ==
Kaji married Ayana Taketatsu on June 23, 2019. On June 30, 2022, he and Taketatsu announced that they were expecting their first child together. On November 3, 2022, the couple announced the birth of their child.

== Filmography ==
=== Anime series ===
List of voice performances in animation
| Year | Title | Role | Notes | Source |
|---|---|---|---|---|
| 2006 | Hellsing Ultimate | Child-faced Priest | | |
| 2006 | Fushigiboshi no Futagohime | Male student | | |
| 2006 | Ouran High School Host Club | Ukyo Chikage | | |
| 2006 | Kirarin Revolution | Takashi Matsushima | | |
| 2006 | La Corda d'Oro | Infantry man, Student | | |
| 2006 | Shōnen Onmyōji | Kōta | | |
| 2006 | Fist of the Blue Sky | Tài-Yán (young) | | |
| 2006–07 | Pururun! Shizuku-chan | Umihiko | | |
| 2007 | Getsumento Heiki Mina | Catcher | | |
| 2007 | El Cazador de la Bruja | Young person | | |
| 2007 | Over Drive | Mikoto Shinozaki | | |
| 2007 | Kishin Taisen Gigantic Formula | Havi | | |
| 2007 | Potemayo | Schoolboy | | |
| 2007 | Night Wizard the Animation | Longinus | | |
| 2008 | Major | Chris | 4th TV series | |
| 2008 | Yatterman | Groom | | |
| 2008 | Kyo Kara Maoh! | Entourage | 3rd season | |
| 2008 | Da Capo II Second Season | Student | | |
| 2008 | Hidamari Sketch × 365 | Schoolboy | | |
| 2008 | Stitch! | Tonbo | | |
| 2008–11 | Inazuma Eleven | Ichinose Kazuya, Akio Fudō, Gianluca Zanardi | | |
| 2008–13 | Yozakura Quartet | Akina Hiizumi | | |
| 2008–14 | Black Butler | Finnian | | |
| 2009 | Kamen Rider Dragon Knight | Trent Moseley | Japanese Dub | |
| 2009 | Slap-up Party: Arad Senki | Pokin | | |
| 2009 | Battle Spirits: Shounen Gekiha Dan | Young Burusutomu | | |
| 2009 | Miracle Train | Iku Shiodome | | |
| 2010 | Bakugan Battle Brawlers: New Vestroia | Gus Grav | | |
| 2010 | Big Windup! Summer tournament | Shun Abe | | |
| 2010 | SD Gundam Sangokuden Brave Battle Warriors | Liu Bei (Ryū Bi) Gundam | | |
| 2010 | Ōkami-san & Her Seven Companions | Saburō Nekomiya | | |
| 2010 | Star Driver | Takeo Takumi/Sword Star | | |
| 2010 | Otome Yōkai Zakuro | Ganryu Hanakiri | | |
| 2010 | Air Gear: Break on the Sky | Kanon | OVA ep. 1 | |
| 2010–16 | Durarara!! | Walker Yumasaki | Also x2 | |
| 2010–19 | Fairy Tail | Lyon Vastia | | |
| 2011 | Mitsudomoe | Ichiro Ogata thick | | |
| 2011 | Danball Senki | Haibara Yūya | | |
| 2011 | Hanasaku Iroha | Koichi Tanemura | | |
| 2011 | Deadman Wonderland | Yō Takami | | |
| 2011 | Blue Exorcist | Konekomaru Miwa | | |
| 2011 | Uta no Prince-Sama | Kaoru Kurusu | | |
| 2011 | No. 6 | Shion | | |
| 2011 | Itsuka Tenma no Kuro Usagi | Iron Rabbit | | |
| 2011 | Baby Princess | Yōtarō Amatsuka | OVA | |
| 2011 | C^{3} | Haruaki Yachi | | |
| 2011 | Shakugan no Shana III Final | Southvalley | | |
| 2011 | Mobile Suit Gundam AGE | Macil Boyd, Leo Louis | | |
| 2011 | Guilty Crown | Shu Ouma | | |
| 2011 | Un-Go | Novelist | | |
| 2011–12 | Inazuma Eleven GO | Satoru Sakisaka, Atsushi Minamisawa | | |
| 2011–12 | Kimi to Boku | Akira | | |
| 2011–13 | Ro-Kyu-Bu! | Subaru Hasegawa | Also SS | |
| 2012 | Aquarion EVOL | Amata Sora | | |
| 2012 | Little Battlers W | Haibara Yūya | | |
| 2012 | Lupin the Third: The Woman Called Fujiko Mine | Lieutenant Oscar | | |
| 2012 | Accel World | Haruyuki Arita | | |
| 2012 | Mysterious Girlfriend X | Kōhei Ueno | | |
| 2012 | Utakoi | Fujiwara no Teika | | |
| 2012 | Blast of Tempest | Megumu Hanemura | | |
| 2012 | Bakuman. | Tatsuro Kosugi | 3rd season | |
| 2012 | Say "I love you" | Kakeru Hayakawa | | |
| 2012 | Ixion Saga DT | Variasion | | |
| 2012 | From the New World | Satoru Asahina (14 years old) | | |
| 2012–13 | Inazuma Eleven GO: Chrono Stone | Okita Sōji, Ichinose Kazuya | | |
| 2012–13 | Pokémon: Black & White: Rival Destinies | Virgil | | |
| 2012–13 | Magi: The Labyrinth of Magic series | Alibaba Saluja | | |
| 2012–15 | K | Tatara Totsuka | Also Return of Kings | |
| 2012–18 | High School DxD series | Issei Hyodo | | |
| 2013 | Maoyu | Blonde Hair Student | | |
| 2013 | Valvrave the Liberator | Q-vier | | |
| 2013 | The "Hentai" Prince and the Stony Cat | Yōto Yokodera | | |
| 2013 | Brothers Conflict | Wataru Asahina | | |
| 2013 | Blood Lad | Knell Hydra | | |
| 2013 | Strike the Blood | Kou Amazuka | | |
| 2013 | White Album 2 | Takahiro Ogiso | | |
| 2013 | Unbreakable Machine-Doll | Felix Kingsfort | | |
| 2013 | Galilei Donna | Galileo Galilei | | |
| 2013 | Pocket Monsters Mewtwo: Prologue to Awaking | Virgil | TV movie | |
| 2013–15 | Diabolik Lovers series | Kanato Sakamaki | | |
| 2013–15 | Pokémon: XY | Clemont | | |
| 2013–16 | Ace of Diamond | Mei Narumiya | | |
| 2013–23 | Attack on Titan | Eren Yeager | | |
| 2014 | Nobunaga the Fool | Toyotomi Hideyoshi | | |
| 2014 | Space Dandy | Prince | | |
| 2014 | Buddy Complex | Fromm Vantarhei | | |
| 2014 | Hozuki's Coolheadedness | Yoshitsune Minamoto | | |
| 2014 | Yowamushi Pedal | Arimaru Toshiya | Ep 26 | |
| 2014 | Kamigami no Asobi | Anubis Ma'at | | |
| 2014 | Black Bullet | Rentarō Satomi | | |
| 2014 | Barakamon | Kousuke Kanzaki | | |
| 2014 | Blue Spring Ride | Kou Mabuchi | | |
| 2014 | Nobunaga Concerto | Oda Nobunaga | | |
| 2014 | Laughing Under the Clouds | Soramaru Kumō | | |
| 2014 | Your Lie in April | Takeshi Aiza | | |
| 2014–15 | Minna Atsumare! Falcom Gakuen | Adol Christin | Also SC in 2015 | |
| 2014–15 | Noragami | Yukine | Also Aragoto | |
| 2014–15 | Nisekoi | Shu Maiko | Also Phase 2 | |
| 2014–18 | Tokyo Ghoul | Ayato Kirishima | Also :re | |
| 2014–21 | World Trigger | Osamu Mikumo | | |
| 2014–21 | The Seven Deadly Sins | Meliodas, Zeldris | | |
| 2014–present | Haikyu!! series | Kenma Kozume | | |
| 2015 | Fafner in the Azure: Exodus | Akira Nishio | | |
| 2015 | Blood Blockade Battlefront | Martin | | |
| 2015 | Wish Upon the Pleiades | Minato's friend | | |
| 2015 | Ushio and Tora | Juurou | | |
| 2015 | Osiris no Tenbin | Assassin | | |
| 2015 | Attack on Titan: Junior High | Eren Jeager | | |
| 2015 | Tantei Team KZ Jiken Note | Kakeru Sunahara | | |
| 2015–16 | The Heroic Legend of Arslan | Silvermask / Hilmes | | |
| 2015–16 | Pokémon: XY&Z | Clemont, Puni-chan | | |
| 2015–19 | One Punch Man | Speed-o'-Sound Sonic | | |
| 2016 | Norn9 | Kakeru Yuiga | | |
| 2016 | Dimension W | Haruka Seameyer | | |
| 2016 | JoJo's Bizarre Adventure: Diamond Is Unbreakable | Koichi Hirose / Echoes | Also Thus Spoke Kishibe Rohan | |
| 2016 | Joker Game | Hatano | | |
| 2016 | Kabaneri of the Iron Fortress | Takumi | | |
| 2016 | Kiznaiver | Katsuhira Agata | | |
| 2016 | Seraph of the End: Vampire Shahal | Shahal | OVA | |
| 2016 | Berserk | Judeau | | |
| 2016 | The Heroic Legend of Arslan: Dust Storm Dance | Hermes | | |
| 2016 | Servamp | Kuro | | |
| 2016 | The Glass Mask Year 3 Class D | Yu Sakurakouji | | |
| 2016 | Occultic;Nine | Yūta Gamon | | |
| 2016 | The Kubikiri Cycle | "I" | OVA | |
| 2016–18 | Classicaloid | Mozart | | |
| 2016–19 | Ace Attorney | Phoenix Wright | Also 2nd season in 2018 & 2019 | |
| 2016–19 | The Morose Mononokean | Hanae Ashiya | 2nd Season | |
| 2016–20 | Tsukiuta. The Animation | Kakeru Shiwasu | | |
| 2016–25 | My Hero Academia | Shoto Todoroki | | |
| 2016–24 | Bananya | Bananya, Manuru, others | | |
| 2017 | Blue Exorcist: Kyoto Saga | Konekomaru Miwa | | |
| 2017 | Yowamushi Pedal: New Generation | Kotaro | Ep 23 | |
| 2017 | Doraemon | Tanuki | | |
| 2017 | Sōtai Sekai | Shin Hazama / Jin | | |
| 2017 | Dive!! | Tomoki Sakai | | |
| 2017 | Convenience Store Boy Friends | Nasa Sanagi | | |
| 2017 | Saiyuki Reload Blast | Tamuro | | |
| 2017 | Our love has always been 10 centimeters apart | Souta Mochizuki | | |
| 2017 | UQ Holder! | Gengorou Makabe | | |
| 2017 | Garo: Vanishing Line | Ricardo | | |
| 2017 | Girls' Last Tour | Jiritsu Kikai | | |
| 2017 | Code: Realize − Guardian of Rebirth | Finis | | |
| 2017–20 | Food Wars!: Shokugeki no Soma | Terunori Kuga | Season 3, 4 & 5 | |
| 2018 | Hakata Tonkotsu Ramens | Lin Xianming | | |
| 2018 | The Disastrous Life of Saiki K. | Touma Akechi | | |
| 2018 | Pop Team Epic | Pipimi | Episode 6-B | |
| 2018 | Nil Admirari no Tenbin: Teito Genwaku Kitan | Hayato Ozaki | | |
| 2018 | Wotakoi: Love is Hard for Otaku | Naoya Nifuji | | |
| 2018 | Dragon Pilot: Hisone and Masotan | Haruto Okonogi | | |
| 2018 | The Legend of the Galactic Heroes: Die Neue These Kaikō | Julian Mintz | | |
| 2018 | The Thousand Musketeers | Kentucky | | |
| 2018 | Lord of Vermilion: The Crimson King | Kamina Chihiro | | |
| 2018 | Junji Ito Collection | Ryou Tsukano | Undisclosed role in credits | |
| 2018 | JoJo's Bizarre Adventure: Golden Wind | Koichi Hirose | | |
| 2018 | Inazuma Eleven: Ares no Tenbin | Sasuke Kozōmaru, Akio Fudō | | |
| 2018–19 | Yu-Gi-Oh! VRAINS | Takeru Homura/Soulburner | Starting in 2nd season | |
| 2018–19 | Inazuma Eleven: Orion no Kokuin | Akio Fudō, Ichinose Kazuya, Sasuke Kozōmaru | | |
| 2018–19 | Blade of the Immortal | Kagehisa Anotsu (young) | | |
| 2019–20 | Ace of Diamond Act II | Mei Narumiya | | |
| 2018–21 | B: The Beginning | Koku | | |
| 2018–22 | Teasing Master Takagi-san | Nishikata | | |
| 2019–23 | Mix | Touma Tachibana | Also 2nd season | |
| 2019 | Demon Slayer: Kimetsu no Yaiba | Sabito | | |
| 2019 | Carole & Tuesday | Joshua | | |
| 2019 | Ensemble Stars! | Mao Isara | | |
| 2019 | Stand My Heroes | Haru Natsume | | |
| 2019 | Psycho-Pass 3 | Arata Shindō | | |
| 2019–20 | Ahiru no Sora | Sora Kurumatani | | |
| 2020 | The Case Files of Jeweler Richard | Henry Claremont | | |
| 2020 | Haikyu!!: Land vs Air | Kenma Kozume | | |
| 2020 | Uchitama?! Have you seen my Tama? | Nora | | |
| 2020 | Dorohedoro | 13 | | |
| 2020 | Motto! Majime ni Fumajime Kaiketsu Zorori | Beat | | |
| 2020 | Shironeko Project: Zero Chronicle | Yami no Ōji | | |
| 2020 | Aggretsuko | Seiya | | |
| 2020 | The Gymnastics Samurai | Tetsuo Minamino | | |
| 2020 | Yo-kai Gakuen Y: N to no Sōgū | Anan | | |
| 2020 | Tototsu ni Egypt Kami | Thoth | | |
| 2020–22 | Dragon Quest: The Adventure of Dai | Hyunckel | | |
| 2021 | Beastars | Pina | Season 2 | |
| 2021 | Back Arrow | Back Arrow | | |
| 2021 | Those Snow White Notes | Takaomi Kaji | | |
| 2021 | Animation x Paralympic | Jun | | |
| 2021 | Motto Majime ni Fumajime Kaiketsu Zorori | Beat | Season 2 | |
| 2021 | Detective Conan | Shuichi Akai (teen) | | |
| 2021 | Megaton Musashi | Takumi Kindaichi | | |
| 2021 | Ranking of Kings | Daida | | |
| 2021 | The Heike Story | Minamoto no Yoshitsune | | |
| 2022 | Pokémon Ultimate Journeys: The Series | Clemont | | |
| 2022 | Love All Play | Akira Uchida | | |
| 2022 | Science Fell in Love, So I Tried to Prove It r=1-sinθ | Chris Floret | | |
| 2023 | Junji Ito Maniac: Japanese Tales of the Macabre | Goro Shinozaki | | |
| 2023 | Bungo Stray Dogs 4 | Saigiku Jōno | | |
| 2023 | Urusei Yatsura (2022) | Tobimaro Mizunokōji | | |
| 2023 | YouTuNya | Tomoneko | | |
| 2023 | Mashle | Rayne Ames | | |
| 2023 | Ōoku: The Inner Chambers | Gyokuei | | |
| 2023 | Synduality: Noir | Weisheit Blaurecht | | |
| 2023 | The Family Circumstances of the Irregular Witch | Sweet Cheeks | | |
| 2023 | Undead Unluck | Rip | | |
| 2023 | Akuma-kun | Akuma II / Ichirō Umoregi | | |
| 2024 | Ishura | Soujiro the Willow-Sword | | |
| 2024 | Kinnikuman: Perfect Origin Arc | Warsman | | |
| 2024 | Oblivion Battery | Taro Yamada | | |
| 2024 | The Fable | Yūki Kawai (Be Daiyocha) | | |
| 2024 | Tonari no Yōkai-san | Buchio Ōishi | | |
| 2024 | Rising Impact | Quester Phoenix | | |
| 2024 | Shinkalion: Change the World | Reiji Takumibe | | |
| 2025 | Go! Go! Loser Ranger! | Kyōsuke Wakaba | Season 2 | |
| 2025 | Blue Box | Kazuma Matsuoka | | |
| 2025 | The Dinner Table Detective | Kageyama | | |
| 2026 | Ace of Diamond Act II season 2 | Mei Narumiya | | |
| 2026 | Kaya-chan Isn't Scary | Namu | | |
| 2026 | Love Through a Prism | Shinnosuke Kobayakawa | | |
| 2026 | Mao | Mao | | |
| 2026 | Star Detective Precure! | Jett | | |
| 2026 | Bleach: Thousand-Year Blood War | Tōshirō Hitsugaya (adult form) | | |
| 2026 | Uncle's Obsession with Cute Things | Wataru Naruto | | |
| 2026 | Magic Knight Rayearth | Clef | | |
| 2026 | Tougen Anki | Hizumi Momotsugi | | |
| 2027 | Inherit the Winds | Sōji Okita | | |

=== Anime films ===
List of voice performances in feature films
| Year | Title | Role | Notes | Source |
|---|---|---|---|---|
| 2010 | Fafner in the Azure: Heaven and Earth | Akira Nishio | | |
| 2012–13 | Berserk: The Golden Age Arc trilogy | Judeau | | |
| 2012 | Blood-C: The Last Dark | Shun Fujimura | | |
| 2012 | Inazuma Eleven GO vs. Danbōru Senki W | Yūya Haibara | | |
| 2012 | Blue Exorcist: The Movie | Konekomaru Miwa | | |
| 2013 | Hanasaku Iroha: The Movie – Home Sweet Home | Kōichi Tanemura | | |
| 2014 | K: Missing Kings | Tatara Totsuka | | |
| 2014 | Pokémon the Movie XY: Diancie and the Cocoon of Destruction | Clemont | | |
| 2014 | Santa Company | Bell | Short film | |
| 2014 | Yo-kai Watch: Tanjō no Himitsu da Nyan! | Fuyunyan/Hovernyan | | |
| 2015 | Pokémon the Movie XY: The Archdjinni of the Rings: Hoopa | Clemont | | |
| 2015 | Ganba: Ganba to Nakama-tachi | Ganba | | |
| 2015 | Yo-kai Watch: Enma Daiō to Itsutsu no Monogatari da Nyan! | Fuyunyan/Hovernyan | | |
| 2016 | Zutto Mae Kara Suki Deshita | Sōta Mochizuki | | |
| 2016 | Ajin Part 2: Shōtotsu | Shinya Nakamura | | |
| 2016 | Pokémon the Movie XY&Z: Volcanion and the Magnificent Magearna | Clemont, Pun-chan | | |
| 2016 | Accel World: Infinite∞Burst | Haruyuki Arita | | |
| 2016 | Gantz: O | Kei Kurono | | |
| 2016 | Suki ni Naru Sono Shunkan o: Kokuhaku Jikkō Iinkai | Sōta Mochizuki | | |
| 2017 | Black Butler: Book of the Atlantic | Finnian | | |
| 2017 | Gō-chan: Moko to Chinju no Mori no Nakama-tachi | Kin-chan | | |
| 2017 | Genocidal Organ | Alex | | |
| 2017 | Red Ash: Gearworld | Beck | | |
| 2017 | Blame! | Atsuji | | |
| 2017 | Fireworks | Minoru | | |
| 2017 | Kimi no Koe o Todoketai | Daigo Koyurugi | | |
| 2017 | Godzilla: Planet of the Monsters | Adam Bindewald | | |
| 2017 | Haikara-san: Here Comes Miss Modern Part 1: 17 year old Benio | Ranmaru Fujieda | | |
| 2018 | Haikara-san: Here Comes Miss Modern Part 2: A Big Romance in Tokyo | Ranmaru Fujieda | | |
| 2018 | Peacemaker Kurogane | Ichimura Tetsunosuke | | |
| 2018 | Maquia: When the Promised Flower Blooms | Krim | | |
| 2018 | Gō-chan: Moko to Koori no Ue no Yakusoku | Kin-chan | | |
| 2018 | Servamp -Alice in the Garden- | Kuro | | |
| 2018 | The Seven Deadly Sins the Movie: Prisoners of the Sky | Meliodas | | |
| 2018 | Batman Ninja | Robin | | |
| 2018 | My Hero Academia: Two Heroes | Shōto Todoroki | | |
| 2018 | Godzilla: City on the Edge of Battle | Adam Bindewald | | |
| 2018 | Godzilla: The Planet Eater | Adam Bindewald | | |
| 2018 | Monster Strike the Movie: Sora no Kanata | Weigh | | |
| 2019 | Even if the World Will End Tomorrow | Shin | | |
| 2019 | Demon Slayer: Kimetsu no Yaiba: The Bonds of Siblings | Sabito | | |
| 2019 | Pretty Cure Miracle Universe | Yango | | |
| 2019 | Detective Conan: The Fist of Blue Sapphire | Rishi Ramanathan | | |
| 2019 | NiNoKuni | Danpa/Handy | | |
| 2019 | Weathering with You | Takai | | |
| 2019 | Kimi dake ni Motetainda | Host | | |
| 2019 | My Hero Academia: Heroes Rising | Shōto Todoroki | | |
| 2020 | Psycho-Pass 3: First Inspector | Arata Shindo | | |
| 2020 | Attack on Titan: Chronicle | Eren Yeager | | |
| 2021 | The Seven Deadly Sins: Cursed by Light | Meliodas, Zeldris | | |
| 2021 | My Hero Academia: World Heroes' Mission | Shōto Todoroki | | |
| 2021 | Goodbye, Don Glees! | Hokuto "Toto" Mitarai | | |
| 2021 | Doraemon: Nobita's Little Star Wars 2021 | Rokoroko | | |
| 2021 | Ensemble Stars!! Road to Show!! | Mao Isara | | |
| 2021 | Bubble | Kai | | |
| 2021 | Teasing Master Takagi-san: The Movie | Nishikata | | |
| 2021 | One Piece Film: Red | Yorueka | | |
| 2021 | Lonely Castle in the Mirror | Ureshino | | |
| 2021 | The Seven Deadly Sins: Grudge of Edinburgh | Meliodas | | |
| 2023 | Gekijōban Collar × Malice Deep Cover | Kei Okazaki | | |
| 2024 | Haikyu!! The Dumpster Battle | Kenma Kozume | | |
| 2024 | Mononoke the Movie: Phantom in the Rain | Saburōmaru Tokita | | |
| 2024 | My Hero Academia: You're Next | Shōto Todoroki | | |
| 2024 | Mobile Suit Gundam: Silver Phantom | Fixzi Fix | | |
| 2025 | Mononoke the Movie: The Ashes of Rage | Saburōmaru Tokita | | |
| 2025 | Batman Ninja vs. Yakuza League | Robin | | |
| 2026 | Star Detective Precure! The Movie: The Mysterious Garden and a Secret Pair | Jett | | |
| 2026 | Armored Trooper VOTOMS: Die Graue Hexe | Ignis Schweinsteiger | | |

=== Drama CD ===
List of voice performances in drama CDs
| Title | Role | Notes | Source |
|---|---|---|---|
| Suikoden II | Jowy Atreides | | |
| The Little Prince | Prince | | |
| Ro-Kyu-Bu! | Subaru Hasegawa | | |
| Brothers Conflict | Wataru Asahina | | |
| Attack on Titan | Eren Yeager | | |
| Diabolik Lovers | Kanato Sakamaki | | resume |
| Missions of Love | Akira Shimotsuki | | |

=== Video games ===
List of voice performances in video games
| Year | Title | Role | Notes | Source |
|---|---|---|---|---|
| 2007 | Soul Nomad & the World Eaters | Galahad | PS1/PS2 | |
| 2008 | Suikoden Tierkreis | Hero | DS | |
| 2009 | Inazuma Eleven 2 | Kazuya Ichinose | Both Fire and Blizzard | |
| 2009 | Final Fantasy XIII | Hope Estheim | PS3 | |
| 2009–10 | Record of Agarest War Zero | Leonis | PS3, Also Dawn of War in 2010 | |
| 2010 | Inazuma Eleven 3 | Acala | Spark and Bomber versions on DS | |
| 2010 | Gods Eater Burst | Shun Ogawa | PSP | |
| 2010–15 | Durarara!! games | Walker Yumasaki | | |
| 2010–17 | Uta no Prince-sama | Kurusu Kaoru | PSP | |
| 2011 | Star Driver | Takumi Takeo (Sword Star) | PSP | |
| 2011 | Shin Megami Tensei: Devil Survivor Overclocked | Keisuke Takagi | 3DS | |
| 2011 | Final Fantasy Type-0 | Ace | PSP | |
| 2011 | Ro-Kyu-Bu! | Subaru Hasegawa | PSP | |
| 2011 | Terror of the Stratus | Makoto Usami | PSP | |
| 2011 | Final Fantasy XIII-2 | Hope Estheim | PS3 | |
| 2011 | Magical Girl Lyrical Nanoha A's Portable: Gears of Destiny | Thoma Avenir | PSP | |
| 2012 | Genso Suikoden: Tsumugareshi Hyakunen no Toki | Zefon | PSP | |
| 2012 | Ys: Memories of Celceta | Adol Christin | | |
| 2012 | Shin Megami Tensei: Devil Summoner: Soul Hackers | Yūichi | 3DS | |
| 2012 | E.X. Troopers | Bren Turner | | |
| 2012–13 | Accel World games | Haruyuki Arita | | |
| 2012–16 | Brothers Conflict games | Wataru Asahina | PSP | |
| 2012–present | Under Night In-Birth series | Seth the Assassin | Also BlazBlue: Cross Tag Battle in 2019 | |
| 2013 | Gintama no Sugoroku | Rokuhiko Niijima | PSP | |
| 2013 | Mind Zero | Kanade Sakyo | | |
| 2013 | JoJo's Bizarre Adventure: All Star Battle | Johnny Joestar | PS3 | |
| 2013 | Lightning Returns: Final Fantasy XIII | Hope Esthem, Bhunivelze | PS3 | |
| 2013 | Grand Theft Auto V | Nippon Merryweather | PC, PS3, PS4, XBOX360, XBOXONE | |
| 2013 | Kamigami no Asobi | Anubis-Ma'at | PSP, also Infinite in 2016 | |
| 2013 | The "Hentai" Prince and the Stony Cat | Yōto Yokodera | PSP | |
| 2013 | High School DxD | Issei Hyodo | 3DS | |
| 2013–14 | Magi: The Labyrinth of Magic games | Alibaba | | |
| 2013–16 | Norn9 games | Kakeru Yuiga | | |
| 2013–present | Diabolik Lovers games | Kanato Sakamaki | | |
| 2014 | Persona Q: Shadow of the Labyrinth | Zen | 3DS | |
| 2014 | Hyrule Warriors | Link | WiiU, Switch | |
| 2014 | Dengeki Bunko: Fighting Climax | Rentaro Satomi, Haruyuki Arita | Also Ignition in 2015 | |
| 2014 | Phantasy Star Nova | Yomi | | |
| 2014–16 | Haikyū games | Kenma Kozume | 3DS | |
| 2014–16 | Code:Realize games | Finis | | |
| 2015 | JoJo's Bizarre Adventure: Eyes of Heaven | Johnny Joestar | | |
| 2015–2016 | Hakuoki games | Kazue Soma 相馬主計 | Starting with Hakuōki: Shinkai - Kaze no Shou | |
| 2016 | Hyrule Warriors Legends | Link | 3DS | |
| 2016 | Shin Megami Tensei IV: Apocalypse | Flynn | 3DS | |
| 2016 | Attack on Titan | Eren Yeager | PS3, other | |
| 2016 | Psycho-Pass | Alpha | | |
| 2016 | Fire Emblem Fates | Takumi | | |
| 2016 | Nil Admirari no Tenbin: Teito Genwaku Kitan | Hayato Ozaki 尾崎隼人 | | |
| 2016 | My Hero Academia Battle For All | Shoto Todoroki | 3DS | |
| 2016 | Ys VIII: Lacrimosa of Dana | Adol Christin アドル=クリスティン | | |
| 2016 | Collar × Malice | Okazaki Kei 岡崎契 | | |
| 2016 | Granblue Fantasy | Veight | iOS/Android | |
| 2016 | Berserk and the Band of the Hawk | Judeau ジュドー | | |
| 2017 | Valkyria Revolution | Basil · Savanju バジル・サバンジュ | | |
| 2017 | Fire Emblem Heroes | Takumi タクミ | | |
| 2017 | Accel World vs. Sword Art Online: Millennium Twilight | Haruyuki Arita (Silver Crow) | PS 4, PS Vita, Windows | |
| 2017 | Onmyoji | Hannya 般若; Hoshiguma Doji | | |
| 2018 | The Seven Deadly Sins: Knights of Britannia | Meliodas | PS4 | |
| 2018 | My Hero One's Justice | Shoto Todoroki | PC, PlayStation 4, Xbox One, Nintendo Switch | |
| 2018 | Food Fantasy | Gyoza, Wonton | Smartphone game | |
| 2018 | Digimon ReArise | Pumpmon パンプモン | Smartphone game | |
| 2019 | Super Smash Bros. Ultimate | Hero (Eight) | DLC | |
| 2019 | Ys IX: Monstrum Nox | Adol Christin | | |
| 2019 | JoJo's Bizarre Adventure: Last Survivor | Koichi Hirose | Arcade | |
| 2019–present | Ikemen Sengoku: Toki o Kakeru Koi | Kichō | iOS, Android | |
| 2020 | My Hero One's Justice 2 | Shoto Todoroki | PS4, Xbox One, Nintendo Switch | |
| 2020 | Death Come True | Hotel concierge | | |
| 2020 | Arknights | Ayerscarpe | iOS, Android | |
| 2020 | HoneyWorks Premium Live | Souta Mochizuki | iOS, Android | |
| 2021 | The King of Fighters All Star | Meliodas | iOS, Android | |
| 2021 | Arena of Valor | Nakroth Dimension Breaker | iOS, Android | |
| 2021 | Tears of Themis | Luke Pearce | iOS, Android | |
| 2021 | No More Heroes III | FU (Jess Baptiste VI) | Nintendo Switch | |
| 2021 | Gate of Nightmares | Cheslion | iOS, Android | |
| 2022 | Super Robot Wars 30 (Expansion Pack DLC) | Ryoma Nagare (Devolution) | PC, PlayStation 4, Nintendo Switch | |
| 2022 | JoJo's Bizarre Adventure: All Star Battle R | Koichi Hirose, Johnny Joestar | PlayStation 4 / 5, Nintendo Switch, Steam, Xbox One, Xbox Series X & S | |
| 2023 | Ys Memoire: The Oath in Felghana | Adol Christin | Nintendo Switch | |
| 2023 | Ys X: Nordics | Adol Christin | PlayStation 4 / 5, Nintendo Switch | |

=== Live action ===
List of acting performances in films and television
| Year | Title | Role | Type | Notes | Source |
|---|---|---|---|---|---|
| 2011 | Kami Voice: The Voice Makes a Miracle | Shiraike Yū | Film | Lead role | |
| 2017 | Hokusai to Meshi Saeareba | Hokusai (voice) | TV | | |
| 2020 | Piple: A.I. to Kekkon Seikatsu Hajimemashita | Kenichi Tsumuki | TV | Lead role, first live-action debut | |
| 2020 | Love Begins When the Money Ends | Shin'ichirō Yamaga | TV | | |
| 2021 | Kikai Sentai Zenkaiger | Gaon/Zenkai Gaon (Voice) | TV | Main cast | |
| 2021 | Nishiogikubo Mitsuboshi Youshudou | Former comedian | TV | Episode 4 | |
| 2021 | Voice II | Masaya | TV | Episode 5 | |
| 2022 | Anime Supremacy! | Ryūichi (voice) | Film | | |
| 2022 | I Will Be Your Bloom | Toshi | TV | Episodes 3–4 | |
| 2024 | Cha-Cha | | Film | | |
| 2025 | No.1 Sentai Gozyuger | Tega Sword (voice) | TV | Main cast | |
| 2025 | The Killer Goldfish | (voice) | Film | | |

=== Dubbing roles ===
==== Live-action ====
List of dubbing performances in live-action
| Title | Role | Voice dub for | Notes | Source |
|---|---|---|---|---|
| 100 Things to Do Before High School | Christian "Crispo" Powers | Owen Joyner | | |
| The Admiral: Roaring Currents | Baek Su-bong | Park Bo-gum | | |
| Avengers: Doomsday | Robert Reynolds / Sentry | Lewis Pullman | | |
| Don't Breathe | Alex | Dylan Minnette | | |
| Famous in Love | Rainer Devon | Carter Jenkins | | |
| Fright Night 2: New Blood | Charley Brewster | Will Payne | | |
| Fury | Norman "Machine" Ellison | Logan Lerman | | |
| Ghostbusters: Afterlife | Trevor Spengler | Finn Wolfhard | | |
| Ghostbusters: Frozen Empire | Trevor Spengler | Finn Wolfhard | | |
| Gladiator II | Emperor Caracalla | Fred Hechinger | | |
| Gossip Girl | Eric van der Woodsen | Connor Paolo | | |
| I Love You, Beth Cooper | Denis Cooverman | Paul Rust | | |
| It Ends with Us | Atlas Corrigan | Brandon Sklenar; Alex Neustaedter | | |
| Killing Eve | Kenneth "Kenny" Stowton | Sean Delaney | | |
| The King's Man | Conrad | Harris Dickinson | | |
| Maurice | Maurice Hall | James Wilby | 2019 Movie Plus edition | |
| Memories of the Sword | Yull | Lee Jun-ho | | |
| Moonshot | Walt | Cole Sprouse | | |
| Pee Mak | Ping | Sean Jindachot | | |
| Pokémon Detective Pikachu | Jack | Karan Soni | | |
| Resident Evil: Welcome to Raccoon City | Leon S. Kennedy | Avan Jogia | | |
| Slaughterhouse Rulez | Willoughby Blake | Asa Butterfield | | |
| Spider-Man: Homecoming | Abraham "Abe" Brown | Abraham Attah | | |
| Stonewall | Danny Winters | Jeremy Irvine | | |
| Thunderbolts* | Robert Reynolds / Sentry / Void | Lewis Pullman | | |
| Titans | Richard "Dick" Grayson / Robin | Brenton Thwaites | | |
| Triloquist | Norbert | Rocky Marquette | | |
| The Vanishing of Sidney Hall | Sidney Hall | Logan Lerman | | |

==== Animation ====
List of dubbing performances in animation
| Title | Role | Notes | Source |
|---|---|---|---|
| DC League of Super-Pets | Chip | | |
| Early Man | Dug | | |
| The Secret Life of Pets (1 & 2) | Norman | | |
| Teenage Mutant Ninja Turtles: Mutant Mayhem | Genghis Frog | | |
| Mo Dao Zu Shi | Jin Ling | | |
| Chuggington | Skipper Stu | | |

== Publications ==
=== Photobooks ===
| Year | Title | Publisher | ISBN |
|---|---|---|---|
| 2012 | Life (ライフ) | Gakken Plus | ISBN 978-4-05-405476-9 |
| 2014 | Kaji Came (カジカメ) | Gakken Plus | ISBN 9784054061491 |
| 2015 | Re-Life (リライフ) | Takarajimasha | ISBN 9784800241146 |

=== Autobiographies ===
| Year | Title | Publisher | ISBN |
|---|---|---|---|
| 2018 | Itsuka Subete ga Kimi no Chikara ni Naru (いつかすべてが君の力になる) | Kawade Shobo Shinsha | ISBN 978-4-309-61713-8 |

== Awards and nominations ==
| Year | Award | Category | Nominated work | Result | Ref. |
|---|---|---|---|---|---|
| 2009 | 3rd Seiyu Awards | Best Rookie Actors | Yozakura Quartet and Black Butler | Won | |
| 2012 | 2011 Famitsu Awards | Male Character Voice Prize | —N/a | Won | |
| 2012 | 2nd Newtype Anime Awards | Voice Actor | —N/a | Nominated | |
| 2013 | 3rd Newtype Anime Awards | Voice Actor | —N/a | Nominated | |
| 2013 | 12th Tokyo Anime Award | Best Voice Actor | Aquarion Evol, Accel World | Won | |
| 2013 | 35th Anime Grand Prix | Best Voice Actor | Accel World | Won | |
| 2013 | 7th Seiyu Awards | Best Actor | High School DxD | Won | |
| 2014 | 36th Anime Grand Prix | Best Voice Actor | Attack on Titan | Won | |
| 2014 | 8th Seiyu Awards | Best Actor | Attack on Titan | Won | |
| 2022 | 6th Crunchyroll Anime Awards | Best VA Performance (Japanese) | Attack on Titan | Won | |
| 2023 | 7th Crunchyroll Anime Awards | Best VA Performance (Japanese) | Attack on Titan | Won | |
| 2024 | 8th Crunchyroll Anime Awards | Best VA Performance (Japanese) | Attack on Titan | Nominated | |
