= The Thousand Musketeers =

2018 video game and media franchise

- The Thousand Noble Musketeers

千銃士 (Senjūshi)
- Video game
- Developer: Line Games; Marvelous Entertainment
- Platform: Android, iOS
- Released: JP: March 2018
- Manga
- Illustrated by: Miki Daichi
- Published by: Kadokawa Shoten
- Magazine: Young Ace
- Original run: June 2018 – December 2019
- Volumes: 2
- Anime television series
- Directed by: Ken'ichi Kasai
- Produced by: Sachi Kawamoto; Takumi Kohama; Junichi Takagi (Note: This is a possible reading of the Kanji 高木潤一, however the romanization is not confirmed.); Ayako Itō (Note: This is a possible reading of the Kanji 伊藤絢子, however the romanization is not confirmed.)
- Written by: Takashi Aoshima
- Music by: Hiroshi Takaki
- Studio: TMS Entertainment; Double Eagle
- Licensed by: NA: Sentai Filmworks
- Original network: Tokyo MX, Sun TV, TVA, BS11
- Original run: July 3, 2018 – September 25, 2018
- Episodes: 12 + OVA
- Video game

The Thousand Noble Muskeeters: Rhodoknight
- Developer: Line Games; Marvelous Entertainment
- Platform: Android, iOS
- Released: JP: November 24, 2021

The Thousand Noble Musketeers (千銃士, Senjūshi) is a Japanese smartphone game developed by Line Games and Marvelous Entertainment, where players collect and fight with various anthropomorphized guns. It was released on Android and iOS devices in March 2018. An anime television series adaptation by TMS Entertainment and Double Eagle aired from July 3 to September 25, 2018. The game's official support ended on October 31, 2019.

== Characters ==
=== American Revolutionary War ===
Brown Bess (ブラウン・ベス, Buraun Besu)
Voiced by: Taku Yashiro
Charleville (シャルルヴィル, Sharuruviru)
Voiced by: Shinnosuke Tachibana
Springfield (スプリングフィールド, Supuringufīrudo)
Voiced by: Shouta Aoi
Kentucky (ケンタッキー, Kentakkī)
Voiced by: Yuki Kaji

=== Napoleon ===
Napoleon (ナポレオン, Naporeon)
Voiced by: Daisuke Namikawa
Rapp (ラップ, Rappu)
Voiced by: Wataru Hatano
Nicola (二コラ, Nikora)
Voiced by: Ayumu Murase
Noël (ノエル, Noeru)
Voiced by: Ayumu Murase

=== The Siege of Osaka ===
Ieyasu (イエヤス)
Voiced by: Tomoaki Maeno (for episode 1 and 2 only), Yūichirō Umehara (from episode 8 onwards)
Hidetada (ヒデタダ)
Voiced by: Sōma Saitō
Yukimura (ユキムラ)
Voiced by: Yoshiki Nakajima

=== The Wars of German Unification ===
Dreyse (ドライゼ, Doraize)
Voiced by: Takuya Satō
Chassepot (ｼｬｽポー, Shasupō)
Voiced by: Takuya Eguchi
Tabatière (タバティエール, Tabatiēru)
Voiced by: Hiroki Takahashi
Lorenz (ローレンツ, Rōrentsu)
Voiced by: Kōtarō Nishiyama

=== Ottoman ===
Ali Pasha (アリ・パシャ, Ari Pasha)
Voiced by: Yūki Ono
Esen (エセン)
Voiced by: Ikkei Yamamoto
Mahmut (マフムト, Mafumuto)
Voiced by: Makoto Furukawa

=== Romanov ===
Aleksandr
Voiced by: Ryō Hirano
Ekaterina
Voiced by: Tsubasa Yonaga

=== The Arrival of Perry ===
Hall
Voiced by: Yusuke Shirai

=== Boshin War ===
Geweer (ゲベール, Gebeeru)
Voiced by: Yuma Uchida

=== Habsburg ===
Karl
Voiced by: Yoshitaka Yamaya
Leopold
Voiced by: Kenji Hamada
Margarita
Voiced by: Natsuki Hanae

=== Bizarre Gun ===
Kiseru
Voiced by: Tatsuhisa Suzuki
Cane
Voiced by: Tarusuke Shingaki
Cutlery
Voiced by: Yoshitsugu Matsuoka

=== Japanese Matchlock Gun ===
Furusato
Voiced by: Motoki Takagi
Kinbee
Voiced by: Katsuyuki Konishi

== Media ==
=== Manga ===
A manga adaptation illustrated by Miki Daichi launched in June 2018 on Kadokawa Shoten's Young Ace magazine. In October 2019, it was announced that the manga would end on December 4. As of December 2019, two tankōbon volumes has been released.

No.	Release date	ISBN
1	November 26, 2018	978-4-04-107491-6
2	December 3, 2019	978-4-04-109064-0

=== Anime ===
Kenichi Kasai directed the anime at TMS Entertainment and Double Eagle. Takashi Aoshima is the series supervisor, Majiro is the character designer, and Hiroshi Takaki composed the music. The opening theme is "antique memory" by Taku Yashiro and Yoshiki Nakajima, and the ending theme is "BLACK MATRIX" by vistlip. Sentai Filmworks have licensed the anime and streamed it on Hidive. The series ran for 12 episodes. An OVA episode was released on March 6, 2019.

No.	Title (Note: All English titles are taken from Hidive.)	Original air date
1	"Noble Musketeers" "Ki jūshi" (貴銃士)	July 3, 2018
2	"Supreme Nobility" "Zettai kōki" (絶対高貴)	July 10, 2018
3	"Soul Weapon" "Shin jū" (心銃)	July 17, 2018
4	"Town" "Machi" (街)	July 24, 2018
5	"Rescue" "Dakkan" (奪還)	July 31, 2018
6	"Smile" "Egao" (笑顔)	August 7, 2018
7	"Negotiation" "Kakehiki" (駆け引き)	August 14, 2018
8	"Adventure" "Bōken" (冒険)	August 21, 2018
9	"Genius" "Tensai" (天才)	August 28, 2018
SP	"The Thousand Musketeers Special Program: Aim for Absolute Nobility! They are Noble!" "Senjūshi tokuban "mezase zettai kōki! Futari wa Noble!"" (『千銃士』特番「目指せ絶対高貴！ ふたりはNoble！」)	September 4, 2018
10	"Total War" "Sōryoku-sen" (総力戦)	September 11, 2018
11	"Destiny" "Innen" (因縁)	September 18, 2018
12	"Be Noble"	September 25, 2018
