= Mix (manga) =

Japanese manga series and its adaptations

- First tankōbon volume cover
- Genre: Coming-of-age; Sports
- Manga
- Written by: Mitsuru Adachi
- Published by: Shogakukan
- Imprint: Monthly Shōnen Sunday Comics
- Magazine: Monthly Shōnen Sunday
- Original run: May 12, 2012 – present
- Volumes: 25
- Anime television series
- Directed by: Toshinori Watabe (1–24); Tomohiro Kamitani (25–48)
- Produced by: Kōji Nagai
- Written by: Atsuhiro Tomioka
- Music by: Norihito Sumitomo
- Studio: OLM Team Kojima (1–24); OLM Team Masuda (25–48)
- Licensed by: Crunchyroll
- Original network: NNS (ytv, Nippon TV)
- Original run: April 6, 2019 – September 23, 2023
- Episodes: 48
- icon

Mix (stylized in all caps) is a Japanese baseball-themed manga series written and illustrated by Mitsuru Adachi. It is a sequel to Touch. It has been serialized in Shogakukan's shōnen manga magazine Monthly Shōnen Sunday since May 2012. As of November 2025, the chapters have been compiled in 25 tankōbon volumes. A 24-episode anime television series adaptation by OLM was broadcast from April to September 2019. A second season was broadcast from April 2023 to September 2023.

== Plot ==
Thirty years after Tatsuya and Kazuya Uesugi brought Meisei High School to their only appearance and championship at the National High School Baseball Championship, a pair of highly talented stepbrothers, Touma and Souichirou Tachibana, bring the possibility of a return to the Kōshien, as they learn of the Meisei High sports heritage of their fathers.

== Characters ==
=== Main characters ===
Touma Tachibana (立花 投馬, Tachibana Tōma)
Voiced by: Yuki Kaji (Japanese); Howard Wang (English)
When Touma was six years old, his widowed father, Eisuke Tachibana, married the widow Mayumi Sawai, who also brought her two children, Souichirou and Otomi, into the family. Touma has a wry sense of humor but is friendly and has an outgoing personality that naturally draws people in. Coincidentally, Touma and Souichirou share the same birthday, Touma only being born ten minutes later than his step-brother. Throughout childhood Touma competed with his new brother to see who would be the destined pitcher of the pair and who would relent and be the catcher for the other. Due to his phenomenal pitching speed and maybe because of a successful round of rock-paper-scissors, Touma became the pitcher. In middle school he was held back from being the ace pitcher while the coach gave preferential treatment to a less talented pitcher. Once that situation was resolved, he became the ace in his final year of middle school and later named ace in his first year of High School. Touma and Otomi are bonded in a 'special' way and Otomi is Touma's first fan. Touma is able to do his best when there's Otomi, even if he hates it when she calls him "Tou-chan".
Souichirou Tachibana (立花 走一郎, Tachibana Sōichirō)
Voiced by: Yuma Uchida (Japanese); Clifford Chapin (English)
Touma's older brother. He is an athletic and intelligent boy, especially gifted with strategic thinking, perfect for his position as catcher on the baseball team. Whenever Souichirou, an overly protective big brother, realizes that their little sister Otomi may be alone at home or otherwise, he will insist that Touma drop whatever task is at hand in order to accompany Otomi instead. He is seemingly competitive with Touma but it is possible that he intentionally forfeited the position of pitcher to Touma when they wagered the position in a game of rock-paper-scissors. Both his stepfather, Eisuke, and his coach, Gorou, (both of whom knew that Souichirou's biological father was an outstanding pitcher himself) express their confusion, on separate occasions, over why he gave up pitching. To his coach he gave a partial response while speaking in third person, "Touma has Souichirou Tachibana when he pitches but he [Souichirou] isn't there when I throw." He also appears to be a ladies'-man, dating many different girls throughout middle school and the early part of high school. After falling in love with Haruka at first sight, he stops dating so many girls but she does not seem inclined to return his affection. He regularly visits the ramen restaurant where she worked part-time just to spend time with her.
Otomi Tachibana (立花 音美, Tachibana Otomi)
Voiced by: Maaya Uchida (Japanese); Dani Chambers (English)
A pretty and popular girl who is a talented flutist in the school's brass band. She is only a year younger than her brother and step-brother. She grew up shy, reserved, and especially frightened of strangers after her father died but Touma's companionship and outgoing, confident personality helped her overcome that weakness. She now seems to rely on Touma as much, if not more, than her blood-related brother and will pay extra attention to him, such as making him "special" versions of food. Otomi is Touma's first fan and thinks that Touma shines, when he throws. Touma and Otomi have a 'special' bond and even Souichirou has taken notice of this. When she first met Haruka, Otomi asked her which of her brothers is her type, but is rendered speechless when Haruka responds "Hmmm, are you worried?"

=== Tachibana family ===
Eisuke Tachibana (立花 英介, Tachibana Eisuke)
Voiced by: Wataru Takagi (Japanese); Bryan Massey (English)
Touma's father, his marriage to Mayumi is his second. His first wife died when Touma was only three years old. He is rough looking, a bit of a goofball and a complainer, but he is also a hard worker (except when skipping work to go to his sons' baseball games), cheerful, and loyal to friends and family. He was a secondary pitcher at Meisei at the same time as Oyama and Sawai, never able to wear the ace number as a player. Although Sawai did gift him his jersey after he was injured.
Mayumi Tachibana (立花 真弓, Tachibana Mayumi)
Voiced by: Kikuko Inoue (Japanese); Mallorie Rodak (English)
The mother of Souichirou and Otomi, her marriage to Eisuke is her second. She was originally married to Keiichi Sawai and never knew of his connection to Eisuke until the second marriage began. She is a beautiful and charming woman but can get upset when her husband and Gorou drink in the middle of the day and disrupt the family's dinner. She has a habit of telling everyone she meets about her family's unique make-up.
Punch (パンチ, Panchi)
Voiced by: Noriko Hidaka (young), Nobuaki Kanemitsu (adult) (Japanese); Emily Fajardo (English)
An energetic but fat Samoyed, as in Touch and H2. Katsu also had a family dog named Punch but it was, appropriately, a Boxer.
Keiichi Sawai (澤井 圭一, Sawai Keiichi)
Souichirou and Otomi's deceased father. In his first year of High School at Meisei he was chosen as the team's ace pitcher over Eisuke in his third year. During the final game of the year his hand was permanently damaged and he never pitched again. Although he could not play, he cheerfully stayed with the team for the next two years as a manager. When he married Mayumi he never told her about his playing days. He died late enough that Souichirou has some memory of him smiling when he gave him a baseball glove, but Otomi says she does not really remember him at all.
Naoko Tachibana (立花 尚子, Tachibana Naoko)
Touma's mother, she died when Touma was three years old. According to Eisuke, she was the ace pitcher of her softball team, and a national tournament runner-up.

=== Meisei students and staff ===
Haruka Ohyama (大山 春夏, Ōyama Haruka)
Voiced by: Kana Hanazawa (Japanese); Madeleine Morris (English)
Gorou's pretty daughter. Upon entering Meisei she joined and quickly became a star of the rhythmic gymnastics team but because of a broken arm in her first year and the club being disbanded in her second year she has also been able to be the baseball team's manager. She is a talented scout and may even have a better mind for the game than her father. When Haruka and Touma were both three and Touma's mother died, they met at the funeral and spent the day together, at one point she punched him for being hyper and disrespectful and made him cry. During a break in the baseball schedule she took Touma on a day trip to the spot where they met in hopes that he would remember their time together. He has no memory of it but she fondly remembers their short time spent together and has always wondered how he turned out.
Gorou Ohyama (大山 吾郎, Ōyama Gorō)
Voiced by: Taiten Kusunoki (Japanese); Jeremy Inman (English)
The new coach of the Meisei High School baseball team. He says he turned down other jobs to take the Meisei position but this may have been a bluff to make him look better. He is generally seen as a lazy guy and not all that responsible, but he has a good mind for baseball. He is separated from his wife, an upcoming author, but not divorced. His daughter moved with him when he started his new job. He was the captain of the Meisei team when he was younger and is still close friends with Eisuke, his former teammate.
Shirou Nangou (南郷 四郎, Nangō Shirō)
Voiced by: Tsuguo Mogami (Japanese); Cris George (English)
A quiet but hulking power hitter and third baseman who moved to Tokyo and entered Meisei presumably to continue playing for Gorou, turning down invitations from more prestigious baseball schools to do so, but it is more likely he did it in order to stay close to Haruka. She just considers him a childhood friend though. He looks intimidating but is easily frightened by insects. Although competing with Souichirou for Haruka's affection, he will quietly tag along with him if they meet and cannot see Haruka.
Ryou Akai (赤井 遼, Akai Ryō)
Voiced by: Koutaro Nishiyama (Japanese); Micah Solusod (English)
A good student and former star soccer player. Arisa Mita likes him but he starts to have feelings for Otomi while they were both Jr. High Class Representatives. His older brother is the star slugger at Kenjou High but he says the two of them do not get along very well. When he gets to High School he quits soccer and joins the baseball team. He is speedy, a good hitter and can play center field. His brother acknowledges his skill.
Arisa Mita (三田 亜里沙, Mita Arisa)
Voiced by: Mariya Ise (Japanese); Mikaela Krantz (English)
She considers Otomi her rival in beauty and popularity and is jealous of her good relationship with her crush, Ryou Akai. She tries to outdo her whenever she can. She eventually secretly befriends Tomohito Akai but insists there's no romantic attraction. She became the manager of the soccer team in middle school, presumably to be close to Ryou, but continues the position in high school despite his departure.
Ichiban Natsuno (夏野 一番, Natsuno Ichiban)
Voiced by: Daiki Kobayashi (Japanese); Alejandro Saab (English)
A boastful classmate of Otomi and a talented pitcher himself. He believes he is destined to be the baseball team's ace pitcher because his name means "Summer's Number One", and indeed he was the Middle School's ace once Touma leaves for High School. He is one of many boys who like Otomi.
Kousaku Koma (駒 耕作, Koma Kōsaku)
Voiced by: Jun Konno (Japanese); Kyle Phillips (English)
A right fielder and power hitter with a high strike out rate. He is a talkative friend of Touma and one of many with a crush on Otomi. He usually has the worst academic scores in class.
Tadashi Imagawa (今川 正, Imagawa Tadashi)
Voiced by: Nobuaki Kanemitsu (Japanese); Dallas Reid (English)
A first baseman (and catcher) who was the former captain of the Meisei Middle School team and is an old friend of Nikaidou, although their friendship was strained while Nikaidou secretly kept his heart condition from him.
Kenji Nishiki (錦 研二, Nishiki Kenji)
A former member of the Jr. High Baseball team who left after punching Coach Kuroyanagi in the face (for wanting to see Touma pitch). He joined a group of delinquents after that but returned to the team in his second year of High School. He is a stellar defender but not as good of a hitter.
Daisuke Nikaidou (二階堂 大輔, Nikaidō Daisuke)
Voiced by: Hiroki Yasumoto (Japanese); Josh Bangle (English)
Nikaidou was once the designated ace of Meisei's Middle School baseball team and the son of a rich alumnus who gifts the team equipment and perks. He has some talent but Touma, Souichirou, and the rest of the team resent him for his privileged position despite what they see as a lack of effort, stamina, and being clearly being inferior to Touma. It is revealed that his severe pitch limit and short practice sessions were actually precautions put on him because of a serious heart condition. He was made ace by the coach not due to any bribes but solely as an unsolicited favor to Daisuke's father, a close friend of his. He is forced to leave baseball after a risky life-saving surgery. Believing that he would die from his surgery, he kept it a secret from everyone, thinking those that criticized him would feel extreme guilt once they learned of his death. However, he too comes to appreciate Touma's talent and closely follows the future teams' progress.
Kuroyanagi (黒柳)
Voiced by: Kazuaki Itō (Japanese); Mike McFarland (English)
A former Meisei Middle School baseball coach. Due largely to Souichirou's game calling, he was able to lead his school's team out of the first tournament block for the first time in 20 years but refused to sit Nikaidou and let Touma pitch in the next block, even though he had obviously lost his ability to pitch effectively. He secretly had a benevolent reason to let him pitch but it led the team to a bad loss after Nikaidou came in late to a tie game and gave up 5 runs to finish it up. Although not forced to, he voluntarily resigned his job for unfairly giving preferential treatment.

=== Others ===
Takumi Nishimura (西村 拓味, Nishimura Takumi)
Voiced by: Tōru Nara (Japanese); Ian Sinclair (English)
The prideful pitcher of the Seinan Junior and High School baseball teams. Like his father before him, he is a very talented pitcher with a particularly good curve ball. He has an obsessive crush on Otomi and goes out of his way to get her attention and ask her out but will also secretly have her picture taken and made into poster sized prints for his room.
Isami Nishimura (西村 勇, Nishimura Isami)
Voiced by: Ryūsei Nakao (Japanese); Chris Sabat (English)
Takumi's father Isami is the coach of Seinan High School, the team he played for when he was a pitching rival of Tatsuya and Kazuya Uesugi, thirty years prior. He is still a bit pompous but has become a slightly humbler man. While he is proud that his son resembles him in looks and pitching talent he is a little annoyed with his similar boastfulness and the same sort of hopeless dogged pursuit of an uninterested girl that he displayed when he was his age.
Hiroki Mita (三田 浩樹, Mita Hiroki)
Voiced by: Daichi Endō
An accomplished left-handed pitcher from Toushuu High. He pitched his team into the quarterfinals of the National Tournament during his second year. In his third year his little sister, Arisa, asked him to bring his team to play a practice game with Meisei in order to humiliate Otomi and her brothers. Although he did win with a complete perfect game, Touma's stunning High School debut somewhat lessened the accomplishment. He pitched the team to the Kōshien that year but only after his team narrowly defeated Meisei in a 15 inning quarter-finals game. He dotes after his younger sister and wants to show off for her, despite her disinterest in baseball.
Tomohito Akai (赤井 智仁, Akai Tomohito)
Voiced by: Tatsuhisa Suzuki (Japanese); Aaron Dismuke (English)
Ryou Akai's older brother and standout member of the team of scouted players at Kenjou High School. An all-around excellent hitter with tremendous power. His team advances to the Spring Kōshien at the end of his first year.
Fumimura (ふみむら, Fumi mura)
Voiced by: Orion Pitts
He is a friendly teacher and used to like baseball.
Ryuuichi Masaki (間崎 竜一, Masaki Ryūichi)
The owner of the 'Dragon' ramen restaurant and later of the 'Caffè'. He is a great fan of the Meisei baseball team.
The character comes from Adachi's previous manga Miyuki.
Shouhei Harada (原田 正平, Harada Shōhei)
Voiced by: Banjō Ginga
A former Meisei student and friend of Tatsuya Uesugi who returns to the school's area with unexplained amnesia. He was a huge boy who looked much older than his teen age and 30 years later looks almost unchanged, although more scarred. In school he was a boxer and a terror to any delinquent who dared challenge him and upon returning to town he still spooks those that recognize him. After saving Otomi from injury or death in a traffic accident he is invited to stay with the Tachibana family while he tries to regain his memory. He prefers to sleep in a tent in the yard. When he saw Touma and Otomi walking together, they reminded him of Tatsuya and Minami of Touch.
Tatsuya Uesugi (上杉 達也, Uesugi Tatsuya)
The main character of Touch, Eisuke Tachibana's senior in the third grade and an ace who, twenty-six years before the start of the series, led Meisei High School to the victory for Koshien and caused a whirlwind within Meisei. He still has a lot of fans both inside and outside of Meisei High School. Kazuya Uesugi, his twin brother and an absolute ace of Meisei, died in a car accident in the first year of high school, and he inherited that dream and became Meisei's ace.
Minami Asakura (浅倉 南, Asakura Minami)
Voiced by: Noriko Hidaka (Japanese); Dawn M. Bennett (English)
Minami is a character from Touch. She serves as the narrator for the Mix anime.

== Media ==
=== Manga ===
Written and illustrated by Mitsuru Adachi, Mix started in Shogakukan's shōnen manga magazine Monthly Shōnen Sunday on May 12, 2012. In May 2020, it was announced that Mix would go on hiatus due to the COVID-19 pandemic. The series returned from its hiatus on October 12, 2020. Shogakukan has collected its chapters into individual tankōbon volumes. The first volume was released on October 12, 2012. As of July 10, 2026, 25 volumes have been released.

==== Volumes ====
No.	Japanese release date	Japanese ISBN
1	October 12, 2012	978-4-09-123867-2
2	March 12, 2013	978-4-09-124120-7
3	August 12, 2013	978-4-09-124393-5
4	January 15, 2014	978-4-09-124593-9
5	June 12, 2014	978-4-09-124759-9
6	December 12, 2014	978-4-09-125490-0
7	June 12, 2015	978-4-09-126149-6
8	December 12, 2015	978-4-09-126599-9
9	June 10, 2016	978-4-09-127239-3
10	December 12, 2016	978-4-09-127468-7
11	June 12, 2017	978-4-09-127629-2
12	February 9, 2018	978-4-09-128155-5
13	August 9, 2018	978-4-09-128478-5
14	February 12, 2019	978-4-09-128858-5
15	August 8, 2019	978-4-09-129366-4
16	February 12, 2020	978-4-09-129709-9
17	February 12, 2021	978-4-09-850451-0
18	December 10, 2021	978-4-09-850825-9
19	July 12, 2022	978-4-09-850825-9
20	February 10, 2023	978-4-09-851602-5
21	September 12, 2023	978-4-09-852818-9
22	May 10, 2024	978-4-09-853315-2
23	February 12, 2025	978-4-09-853853-9
24	November 12, 2025	978-4-09-854338-0
25	July 10, 2026	978-4-09-854703-6

=== Anime ===
An anime television series adaptation aired from April 6 to September 28, 2019, on Nippon TV and Yomiuri TV. Produced by OLM, Yomiuri Telecasting Corporation and Shogakukan-Shueisha Productions, the series is directed by Toshinori Watanabe, with Atsuhiro Tomioka handling series composition, Takao Mai designing the characters and Norihito Sumitomo composing the music. The first opening theme song is "Equal" (イコール, Ikōru), performed by Sumika, while the first ending theme song is "Kimi ni Todoku Made" (君に届くまで; lit. 'Until It Reaches You'), performed by Little Glee Monster. The second opening theme song is "VS", performed by Porno Graffitti, while the second ending theme song is "Kimi ni Tsutaeta Story" (君に伝えたストーリー; lit. 'The Story I Told You'), performed by Qyoto. Funimation streamed the series, and produced an English dub as it aired.

A second season was announced on August 6, 2022. Tomohiro Kamitani replaced Toshinori Watanabe as director, while the rest of the main staff returned from the first season. It aired from April 1 to September 23, 2023. For the second season, the first opening theme song is "Starting Over", performed by Sumika, while the first ending theme song is "Haru no Oto" (ハルノオト; lit. 'Sounds of Spring'), performed by Miwa. The second opening theme song is "Amaryllis" (アマリリス, Amaririsu), performed by Blue Encount, while the second ending theme song is "Ima Kono Toki o" (今この瞬間(とき)を; lit. 'This Very Moment'), performed by Little Glee Monster.

==== Episodes ====
===== Season 1 =====
No.	Title	Directed by	Written by	Original release date
1	"Meisei's Ace"; Transliteration: "Meisei no ēsu" (Japanese: 明青のエース)	Toshinori Watanabe	Atsuhiro Tomioka	April 6, 2019
Thirty years have passed since the Meisei High School baseball team, with its ace Tatsuya Uesugi, won its first championship in its first appearance at the nationals. The Meisei High School baseball team is in the dumps, and the two step-brothers, Touma and Souichirou, who are members of the team, are feeling frustrated. Then their younger sister, Otomi, enters the school.
2	"I'm the Big Brother and You're the Little Brother"; Transliteration: "Ore ga aniki de omae ga otōto" (Japanese: おれが兄貴でおまえが弟)	Tōru Ishida	Tatsuto Higuchi	April 13, 2019
Touma's father and Souichirou and Otomi's mother remarry, and the three become siblings. Touma and Souichirou dream of playing as a pitcher and catcher on the Meisei High School baseball team, but the coach, Kuroyanagi, makes Nikaidou, the son of the president of the alumni association who is his best friend, the ace.
3	"Who Cares About Meisei High School?"; Transliteration: "Meisei gakuen nante" (Japanese: 明青学園なんて)	Takumi Shibata	Yoshifumi Fukushima	April 20, 2019
The baseball team barely makes it through the regional tournament thanks to the efforts of Touma and Souichirou. If they can change their ace, they will be a good team, but the coach still will not change his mind. When Natsuno protests, he is told that if he is not satisfied, he should report to the club.
4	"I Wish We Could Trade"; Transliteration: "Torēdo shitē nā" (Japanese: 交換(トレード)してえなァ)	Shōhei Yamanaka	Kenichi Yamada	April 27, 2019
Touma and Souichirou somehow managed to win and make it to the Tokyo tournament for the first time in 20 years. However, the finals stand in their way. When Koma challenges them to a fight for a date with Otomi, they give it their all.
5	"You're a Pitcher, Right?"; Transliteration: "Pitchā daro?" (Japanese: ピッチャーだろ？)	Akimi Fudesaka	Kenichi Yamada	May 4, 2019
Despite being hit by Nishimura's homerun, Touma and Souichirou defended desperately, and by the end of the 5th inning, the score was barely tied. However, the batting lineup was completely helpless in front of their ace Nishimura, who had a first-class curve ball as his decisive pitch.
6	"In the Spring"; Transliteration: "Haru ga kureba" (Japanese: 春がくれば)	Gorō Kuji	Atsuhiro Tomioka	May 11, 2019
Invited by Captain Imagawa, Touma and Souichirou head to the hospital. What they find in the hospital is Nikaidou. Nikaidou's secret is revealed to them for the first time. Coach Kuroyanagi, who knew everything about Nikaidou, leaves Meisei High School without saying a word.
7	"Are You Worried?"; Transliteration: "Shinpai?" (Japanese: 心配？)	Toshinori Watanabe; Ryōta Miyazawa	Chinatsu Hōjō	May 18, 2019
Touma and Souichirou have entered Meisei High School and are on their way to the nationals. When they return home after a hard day of practice, they find that the new coach, Ooyama, has come to visit. When Touma opens the door to the washroom, he finds Haruka in the middle of changing her clothes.
8	"My Brother"; Transliteration: "Uchi no oniichan" (Japanese: うちのお兄ちゃん)	Tōru Ishida	Tatsuto Higuchi	May 25, 2019
Souichirou takes refuge in a diner due to the sudden heavy rain and runs into Arisa Mita, who sees Otomi as a rival, and learns that her brother Hiroki is the ace of Toushuu High, the top eight team in last year's nationals. Later, Toushuu High asks Meisei High School for a practice match.
9	"A Bigger Deal"; Transliteration: "Dai nyūsu desho" (Japanese: 大ニュースでしょ)	Takumi Shibata	Yoshifumi Fukushima	June 1, 2019
Meisei High School is helpless in the face of Mita, the ace of Toushuu High, the top eight in the nationals. Arisa, Mita's younger sister, who has a rivalry with Otomi, boasts about her brother's overwhelming ability, and Otomi is indeed not at peace inside. Just then, Natsuno realizes something.
10	"We Just Went for a Walk"; Transliteration: "Tada no sanpo" (Japanese: ただの散歩)	Taku Yamada	Chinatsu Hōjō	June 8, 2019
Otomi is surrounded by Nishimura, Koma, Natsuno, Arisa, and Akai. Meanwhile, Souichirou and Nangou have become regulars at the noodle shop where Haruka works. Then, Touma receives a letter from Haruka. In the letter is a certain request.
11	"Try Pitching"; Transliteration: "Nagete miro" (Japanese: 投げてみろ)	Gorō Kuji	Kenichi Yamada	June 15, 2019
A bus of the Seinan High School baseball team happens to be passing by, and rescues Touma and Haruka when they get lost. When Coach Nishimura asks about their relationship, Haruka says that they are childhood friends, but Touma, who has no memory of their childhood, denies it. Haruka declares war on Seinan.
12	"Aren't You Taking Him Lightly?"; Transliteration: "Nametemasen ka" (Japanese: なめてませんか)	Shōhei Yamanaka	Tatsuto Higuchi	June 22, 2019
While passing by the house of Akai, a classmate of Otomi's, Touma meets Tomohito, Akai's older brother who is a member of the Kenjou High baseball team. Kenjou High is a renamed school of Sumikou, which used to compete with Meisei High School for the nationals, but like Meisei, it has fallen on hard times.
13	"Because We're Brothers"; Transliteration: "Kyōdai dakara" (Japanese: 兄弟だから)	Akimi Fudesaka	Atsuhiro Tomioka	June 29, 2019
The summer national regional tournament has begun. Their opponent in the first round is Kenjou High, formerly known as Sumikou. Kenjou High, which has been working to revive its reputation, has become a team with a strong batting line and mobility, led by the older brother of Akai, a classmate of Otomi.
14	"They're Losing"; Transliteration: "Maketemasu" (Japanese: 負けてます)	Tōru Ishida	Yoshifumi Fukushima	July 13, 2019
The first round game between Meisei High School and Kenjou High turned into a tense pitching duel. When Otomi, who is in class, calls Natsuno at the baseball stadium, she finds Touma standing in the batter's box. With Otomi cheering him on, he swings the bat. The ball hits a home run, but something happens.
15	"I Wanted to See Her Face"; Transliteration: "Ano kao ga mitakute" (Japanese: あの顔が見たくて)	Akira Koremoto	Kenichi Yamada	July 20, 2019
Touma hits a home run against Akai, the cleanup batter of Kenjou High. The game went into the final stages. In the bottom of the eighth inning, with one run down, Meisei Highschool's offense was the leadoff, the strongest part of the batting order, but they quickly got two outs.
16	"Full of Fight"; Transliteration: "Kakki ga atte" (Japanese: 活気があって)	Takumi Shibata	Atsuhiro Tomioka	July 27, 2019
After the match against Kenjou High, Meisei High School is back to its normal routine. In the middle school, Arisa Mita is still rivaling with Otomi. However, it seems that Akai, who Arisa has a crush on, has his eyes set on Otomi...
17	"Reminds Me of Someone"; Transliteration: "Yappari dareka ni" (Japanese: やっぱりだれかに)	Gorō Kuji	Tatsuto Higuchi	August 3, 2019
With rivals from seeded school teams appearing one after another, the road to the nationals becomes increasingly tough, but Touma has no intention of backing down. Meisei High School's opponent in the second round is Sankou Academy, a team that has a certain history with the team that won the national championship 30 years ago.
18	"On a Rainy Day Like Today"; Transliteration: "Konna ame no hi ni" (Japanese: こんな雨の日に)	Toshinori Watanabe	Chinatsu Hōjō	August 10, 2019
Meisei High School has been attracting public attention due to the flashy performance of the Tachibana brothers. However, Haruka is worried that if they continue to win, it will put a heavy burden on their ace Touma. However, the coach, Ooyama, does not seem to think that far ahead.
19	"Do You Envy Them?"; Transliteration: "Urayamashii ka?" (Japanese: うらやましいか？)	Akira Koremoto; Toshinori Watanabe	Yoshifumi Fukushima	August 17, 2019
Even though the baseball team is in the spotlight of the public, Touma keeps his own pace. In the next game after his no-hit, no-run performance, he is having a hard time getting back on track. Nevertheless, he manages to keep his opponents at bay with advice from Haruka and a lead from Souichirou.
20	"In the Hands of a God"; Transliteration: "Kamidanomi nandesu ne" (Japanese: 神頼みなんですね)	Akimi Fudesaka	Chinatsu Hōjō	August 24, 2019
The Meisei High School baseball team has made it to the top eight of the East Tokyo Tournament. The nationals were finally in sight, and the expectations of the surrounding people and the world were growing more and more excited. However, after pitching four games in a row since the first game, Touma's physical condition was too exhausted to ignore.
21	"If..."; Transliteration: "Moshimo..." (Japanese: もしも...)	Gorō Kuji	Tatsuto Higuchi	August 31, 2019
Meisei High School, who retained Touma, managed to hang on against the veteran Kaiounishi. However, the score gap gradually widened, and before they knew it, they had given up a big lead. Then, without Touma on the mound, the game entered the bottom of the ninth inning.
22	"Affection for His Sister"; Transliteration: "Imōto omoi nandesu yo" (Japanese: 妹思いなんですよ)	Takumi Shibata	Kenichi Yamada	September 7, 2019
The semi-finals of the East Tokyo Tournament have finally begun. Meisei High School took on Mita, the ace of Toushuu, who had scored no runs so far in this tournament. They had taken all possible countermeasures based on the experience of playing against him once, but they were quickly struck out by three consecutive batters.
23	"It's Only a Matter of Time"; Transliteration: "Jikan no mondai da na" (Japanese: 時間の問題だな)	Tōru Ishida	Kenichi Yamada	September 14, 2019
The semi-final between Meisei and Toushuu was a close game. Meisei High School seemed to be at an overwhelming disadvantage, but thanks to the great pitching of Touma, the game went on without either team scoring a run. Then, in the bottom of the 6th inning, for the first time that day, Touma's careless pitch was hit by batter Mita, and he was given a double.
24	"A Bit Like Him?"; Transliteration: "Niteru to omowanai ka?" (Japanese: 似てると思わないか？)	Toshinori Watanabe	Atsuhiro Tomioka	September 28, 2019
The semi-final between Meisei High School and Toushuu High continues to be a close game with no score from either team. In the extra innings, Mita, a super high school class lefty from Toushuu, becomes even more impressive. In contrast, Touma rapidly makes progress during the game. Before he knows it, his pitching form has become the ideal way to throw.

===== Season 2 =====
No.	Title	Directed by	Written by	Original release date
25	"Looking Forward to Working With You"; Transliteration: "Yoroshiku Tanomuwa" (Japanese: よろしく頼むわ)	Fumio Ito	Atsuhiro Tomioka	April 1, 2023
Stepbrothers Touma and Suichirou are ace players on Meisei High School's baseball team.
26	"Leave Me Alone"; Transliteration: "Ore ni Kamau na" (Japanese: おれに構うな)	Takuya Wada	Kenichi Yamada	April 8, 2023
27	"Don't You Know What Month It is?!" Transliteration: "Nangatsuda to Omotte nda!?" (Japanese: 何月だと思ってんだ！？)	Fumio Ito	Chinatsu Hōjō	April 15, 2023
28	"Convince Him"; Transliteration: "Aitsu o Kudoke" (Japanese: あいつをくどけ)	Noriyuki Nakamura	Natsumi Morichi	April 22, 2023
29	"What's up, Scary Stranger?"; Transliteration: "Nanda? Fushinsha" (Japanese: なんだ？不審者)	Yasuo Ejima	Yoshifumi Fukushima	April 29, 2023
30	"It's Not a Dream"; Transliteration: "Yume ja Nai" (Japanese: 夢じゃない)	Michita Shiroishi	Atsuhiro Tomioka	May 6, 2023
31	"Isn't It Just a Practice Match?"; Transliteration: "Tada no Renshūjiai Daro?" (Japanese: ただの練習試合だろ？)	Fumio Ito	Kenichi Yamada	May 13, 2023
32	"Yeah, That's Their Ace"; Transliteration: "Are ga Ēsu da Yo" (Japanese: あれがエースだよ)	Yuki Morita	Natsumi Morichi	May 20, 2023
33	"Let's Play!"; Transliteration: "Shōbu!" (Japanese: 勝負！)	Noriyuki Nakamura	Chinatsu Hōjō	May 27, 2023
34	"Don't Underestimate It!"; Transliteration: "Nameruna yo!" (Japanese: なめるなよ！)	Masahiro Matsunaga	Yoshifumi Fukushima	June 3, 2023
35	"Let's Pretend We Didn't See"; Transliteration: "Minakatta Koto ni Shiyōka" (Japanese: 見なかったことにしようか)	Fumio Ito	Chinatsu Hōjō	June 10, 2023
36	"He's Calling You"; Transliteration: "Yondandesu yo" (Japanese: 呼んだんですよ)	Takafumi Hino	Kenichi Yamada	June 17, 2023
37	"This Season"; Transliteration: "Kono Kisetsu ni Wa" (Japanese: この季節には)	Yasuo Ejima	Natsumi Morichi	June 24, 2023
38	"Part 2"	Yasuyuki Fuse	Yoshifumi Fukushima	July 8, 2023
39	"Eishin?"; Transliteration: "Eishin?" (Japanese: えいしん？)	Takashi Kojima	Chinatsu Hōjō	July 15, 2023
40	"Play Hard!"; Transliteration: "Zenryoku Purēda!" (Japanese: 全力プレーだ！)	Fumio Ito	Natsumi Morichi	July 22, 2023
41	"It Really is Special, isn't It?"; Transliteration: "Tokubetsu da yo na" (Japanese: 特別だよな)	Asahi Yoshimura	Kenichi Yamada	July 29, 2023
42	"Who is That?"; Transliteration: "Are wa... Dareda?" (Japanese: あれは・・・・誰だ？)	Noriyuki Nakamura	Yoshifumi Fukushima	August 5, 2023
43	"That's a Good Expression"; Transliteration: "Īkao Shitemasu ne" (Japanese: いい顔してますね)	Masahiro Matsunaga; Tomohiro Kamitani	Kenichi Yamada	August 12, 2023
44	"That's Our Best Game"; Transliteration: "Besuto Gēmu da yo" (Japanese: ベストゲームだよ)	Fumio Ito	Natsumi Morichi	August 19, 2023
45	"Just One More"; Transliteration: "Ato Hitotsu" (Japanese: あとひとつ)	Yasuo Ejima	Chinatsu Hōjō	September 2, 2023
46	"As Ever"; Transliteration: "Kawari Naku" (Japanese: 変わりなく)	Yuki Morita	Yoshifumi Fukushima	September 9, 2023
47	"No."; Transliteration: "Yada Yo" (Japanese: やだよ)	Yasuyuki Fuse	Natsumi Morichi	September 16, 2023
48	"Counting On You"; Transliteration: "Tanonda zo" (Japanese: 頼んだぞ)	Takafumi Hino	Atsuhiro Tomioka	September 23, 2023

== Reception ==
By November 11, 2012, volume 1 had sold 284,084 copies. By April 6, 2013, volume 2 had sold 345,120 copies. Volume 2 was the 48th best-selling manga volume from November 19, 2012, to May 19, 2013, with 390,176 copies and the 82nd best-selling manga volume from November 19, 2012, to November 17, 2013, with 464,362 copies. By April 6, 2013, volume 3 had sold 319,599 copies. By January 12, 2014, volume 4 had sold 182,060 copies. By 2019, the manga had 8 million copies in circulation.
