= Tougen Anki =

Japanese manga series and its adaptation(s)

- Tougen Anki: Legend of the Cursed Blood
- First tankōbon volume cover, featuring Shiki Ichinose

桃源暗鬼 (Tōgen Anki)
- Genre: Adventure; Dark fantasy
- Manga
- Written by: Yura Urushibara
- Published by: Akita Shoten
- English publisher: NA: Yen Press
- Imprint: Shōnen Champion Comics
- Magazine: Weekly Shōnen Champion
- Original run: June 11, 2020 – present
- Volumes: 31
- Manga

Tougen Anki Gaiden: Tsuki to Sakura no Kyōsō Kyoku
- Written by: Dōma Oda
- Published by: Akita Shoten
- Imprint: Shōnen Champion Comics
- Magazine: Monthly Shōnen Champion
- Original run: June 6, 2025 – present
- Volumes: 2
- Anime television series
- Directed by: Ato Nonaka
- Produced by: Takanori Matsuoka; Yūma Adaniya; Yuki Muramatsu; Tatsuya Ishiguro
- Written by: Yukie Sugiwara
- Music by: Kohta Yamamoto
- Studio: Studio Hibari
- Licensed by: Remow
- Original network: NNS (Nippon TV)
- Original run: July 11, 2025 – present
- Episodes: 32
- icon

Tougen Anki: Legend of the Cursed Blood (桃源暗鬼, Tōgen Anki) is a Japanese manga series written and illustrated by Yura Urushibara. It has been serialized in Akita Shoten's shōnen manga magazine Weekly Shōnen Champion since June 2020. An anime television series adaptation produced by Studio Hibari aired from July to December 2025. A second season premiered in October 2026.

== Plot ==
Shiki Ichinose is a rebellious teenager living with his adoptive father, Tsuyoshi. One day, their lives are upended when they are attacked by an assassin, leading Shiki to discover that he is an Oni and that Tsuyoshi was formerly a Momotarou, a hunter of Oni, who abandoned his duty to raise him. Following Tsuyoshi's death, Shiki is drawn into the longstanding conflict between the Oni and the Momotarou, vowing to survive and exact revenge.

== Characters ==
=== Rasetsu Academy ===
==== Students ====
Shiki Ichinose (一ノ瀬 四季, Ichinose Shiki)
Voiced by: Kazuki Ura, Shizuka Ishigami (young) (Japanese); Zeno Robinson, Rebecca Wang (young) (English)
Shiki is an oni whose powers manifest after an attack by the Momotarou results in the death of his adoptive father. Biologically, he is one of the eight children of Kishin and inherits the Fire elemental attribute. His Blood Eclipse Release manifests as various guns, a reflection of his past interest in them. The tremendous output of his power generates severe aftereffects, such as causing blood to rain from the sky.
Jin Kougasaki (皇后崎 迅, Kōgasaki Jin)
Voiced by: Koutaro Nishiyama, Shu Uchida (young) (Japanese); Khoi Dao, Anne Yatco (young) (English)
A student in Shiki's class and his roommate. His father is a Momotarou who previously attempted to kill Jin after he discovered his son was an oni, leaving Jin with scars and stitches all over his body. His father also killed his mother and sister for the same reason. As a result, Jin seeks little else but to eventually get powerful enough to kill his father, often brushing off Shiki and the others. His Blood Eclipse Release manifests as buzz saws that pop out from his wounds.
Homare Byobugaura (屏風ヶ浦 帆稀, Byōbugaura Homare)
Voiced by: Manaka Iwami (Japanese); Erica Mendez (English)
A student in Shiki's class. In her past, she was heavily abused by her parents, leaving her constantly apologetic and self-deprecating. Her Blood Eclipse Release manifests as the "Blood Titan", a gargantuan, ghoul-like representation of her sister, who used to protect her from their parents before being killed by their father.
Ikari Yaoroshi (矢颪 碇, Yaoroshi Ikari)
Voiced by: Shogo Sakata (Japanese); Alejandro Saab (English)
A student in Shiki's class. Having a volatile temper, his Blood Eclipse Release manifests as any object that comes to mind whenever he is in a bad mood.
Juji Yusurube (遊摺部 従児, Yusurube Jūji)
Voiced by: Natsuki Hanae (Japanese); Edward Mendoza (English)
A student in Shiki's class. Though he generally appears collected and intelligent, he is actually a massive pervert who frequently tries to lose his virginity, to no avail. His Blood Eclipse Release manifests as sonar, which activates by seeping into cracks and traveling relatively far distances.
Rokuro Kiriyama (手術岾 ロクロ, Kiriyama Rokuro)
Voiced by: Kaito Miura (Japanese); Ricco Fajardo (English)
A student in Shiki's class. He is extremely averse to all uncomfortable situations, a result of him losing his oni girlfriend to an illness. His Blood Eclipse Release manifests as paper fans and a dancing outfit, having been a dancer in the oni village he grew up in. He also displays a more outgoing and confident personality whenever he uses his Blood Eclipse Release.
Kuina Sazanami (漣 水鶏, Sazanami Kuina)
Voiced by: Aimi (Japanese); Rebecca Wang (English)
A student in Shiki's class. Though usually appearing brash and tough, she has a motherly fetish that causes her to uncontrollably dote on men she sees as weak and is attracted to. Sazanami soon forces Kiriyama into a relationship under this pretense, much to his dismay. Her Blood Eclipse Release manifests as kickboxing gloves.

==== Staff ====
Principal (校長, Kōchō)
Voiced by: Megumi Ogata (Japanese); Kayleigh McKee (English)
The mysterious headmaster of Rasetsu Academy. Though he and Mudano have a good relationship, he rarely speaks to him in person and is almost always covered from head to toe in traditional Japanese garb; his real appearance is that of an androgynous man with blue skin, white hair, and tattoos all over his body.
Naito Mudano (無陀野 無人, Mudano Naito)
Voiced by: Hiroshi Kamiya (Japanese); Stephen Fu (English)
The teacher of Shiki's class. A taciturn, strict man, he is a highly-skilled fighter respected as such by both the oni and the Momotarou. He often travels on roller skates instead of walking. His Blood Eclipse Release manifests as an umbrella.
Kyoya Oiranzaka (花魁坂 京夜, Oiranzaka Kyōya)
Voiced by: Ryōhei Kimura (Japanese); Mark Whitten (English)
A medical oni initially the main force behind the medical wing of the oni's Kyoto branch, but later becoming Rasetsu Academy's personal doctor. His Blood Eclipse Release grants him the ability to perform miraculous blood transfusions that can even restore lost limbs, although he can only do a certain amount at a time. Though often called out for being lecherous, he has a deep care for his patients.

=== Oni ===
Kaoru Namikido (並木度 馨, Namikido Kaoru)
Voiced by: Haruki Ishiya (Japanese); Ezra Weisz (English)
An oni in the reconnaissance unit who is disguised as an ordinary librarian. He activates his Blood Eclipse Release by shaking a vial of his blood. The blood echoes back, giving him the locations of nearby people and the layouts of buildings, much like animal echolocation. Additionally, anyone can use his power by shaking the same vial, though there are certain restrictions; one such restriction is based on a person's IQ.
Masumi Yodogawa (淀川真澄, Yodogawa Masumi)
Voiced by: Atsushi Tamaru (Japanese); Griffin Puatu (English)
The captain of the Nerima branch reconnaissance sector. He always has an unsettling smile, regardless of how tense a situation is. His Blood Eclipse Release grants him the power to go invisible for about 10 minutes. This also includes his clothing. It is activated by simply consuming his own blood.

=== Momotarou ===
The main antagonists of the series, based on the Japanese folk heroes of the same name. Similar to the oni ability to manipulate blood, Momotarou are able to wield their own black bacteria for this purpose.

Samidare Momoya (桃屋 五月雨, Momoya Samidare)
Voiced by: Yasunori Masutani (Japanese); Patrick Seitz (English)
A leading Momotarou officer with an intense hatred for oni. Driven by envy for his colleague Tsuyoshi Ichinose, he murdered him after hunting him down when he left the Momotarou agency.
Tsubakiri Momomiya (桃宮 唾切, Momomiya Tsubakiri)
Voiced by: Daisuke Kishio (Japanese); Howard Wang (English)
A captain in Kyoto's Momotarou branch. A sadistic man, he lost his capacity for empathy after a berserk oni child murdered his mentor and the latter's family, and came to work primarily in a scientific capacity, dissecting oni corpses. His Momotarou ability allows him to manipulate corpses, including homunculi creations of his own making, that he transfers his bacteria to. After leading the assault on the oni's Kyoto branch, he is mortally wounded by Shiki's awakened Enki abilities, before being finished off by Mudano.
Yomogi Momokusa (桃草 蓬, Momokusa Yomogi)
Voiced by: Mariya Ise (Japanese); Allegra Clark (English)
Tsubakiri's partner. Her Momotarou ability allows her to create near-impenetrable walls with her bacteria.
Shinya Momoiwa (桃巌 深夜, Momoiwa Shinya)
Voiced by: Chiharu Sawashiro (Japanese); Damien Haas (English)
A captain in Tokyo's Momotarou branch. His Momotarou ability allows him to peer into the vision of up to 36 people for 24 hours. He is also capable of making a target see his vision, as long as his bacteria is present on them. Due to the non-combative nature of his power, Momoiwa was often deemed by fellow Momotarou as being unable to advance highly, causing him to become obsessed with status and begin using underhanded tactics—including breaking Momotarou policy by putting the lives of humans in danger—to advance through the ranks. He targets Shiki with the hopes that killing Enki will further advance his rank, and resorts to manipulating Mikado and torturing Kougasaki to do so. Momoiwa is eventually killed after Kougasaki uses his oni power to slit his throat.
Mikado Momodera (桃寺 神門, Momodera Mikado)
Voiced by: Shun'ichi Toki (Japanese); Brian Timothy Anderson (English)
A kindly Momotarou and Momoiwa's partner, regarded as a prodigy. He and Shiki, unaware of each other's identities, became fast friends after meeting each other in Tokyo. Momoiwa used this to reveal Shiki's true identity and manipulate him into thinking that Shiki murdered innocent humans. After they part ways, however, Mikado expresses sympathy for the oni, which causes him to get transferred. His Momotarou power is similar to Shiki's oni power in that it allows him to create guns.
Tsukuyomi Momoka (桃華 月詠, Momoka Tsukuyomi)
Voiced by: Shintarō Asanuma (Japanese); Clifford Chapin (English)
An officer in Tokyo's Momotarou branch, and Osuke's partner. His Momotarou power allows him to use his bacteria to create soldiers based on tarot cards that he draws. Because of his ability, he has an extreme proclivity towards fortune telling, and often will not indulge in combat if he draws an unfavorable fortune. He is defeated by Mudano, but has his life spared.
Osuke Momokado (桃角 桜介, Momokado Osuke)
Voiced by: Yūki Ono (Japanese); Kevin Andrew Rivera (English)
An officer in Tokyo's Momotarou branch, and Tsukuyomi's partner. A bloodthirsty man, he solely seeks the thrill of the fight and challenges oni such as Mudano with the hopes of defeating powerful opponents. His Momotarou power allows him to use his bacteria to copy the ability of any ability he sees within a 24-hour period. He is eventually defeated by Ikari, but survives after being recovered by other Momotarou.
Kusabi Momoura (桃裏 楔, Momōra Kusabi)
Voiced by: Kenichi Suzumura
The chief of the Momotarou's Kegon Falls Research Facility. He is a sadistic researcher who likes conducting organ harvesting experiments. His Momotarou ability allows him to use his bacteria to turn organs into visceral dolls.
Hizumi Momotsugi (桃次 歪, Momotsugi Hizumi)
Voiced by: Yuki Kaji
The 10th Unit Captain of the Momotarou's Kegon Falls Research Facility who is loyal to Momoura. His Momotarou ability allows him to use his bacteria to distort whatever it touches.
Senritsu Momoo (桃尾 旋律, Momō Senritsu)
Voiced by: Kishō Taniyama
The Third Unit Vice-Captain of the Momotarou's Kegon Falls Research Facility. His Momotarou ability allows him to manipulate his voice.

=== Other characters ===
Tsuyoshi Ichinose (一ノ瀬剛志, Ichinose Tsuyoshi)
Voiced by: Tsuyoshi Koyama (Japanese); Imari Williams (English)
Shiki's adoptive father. Formerly a Momotarou partnered with Momoya, he took an infant Shiki in after discovering that he is a child of Kishin and left the organization, presumably due to being unable to murder a child. Momoya's envy eventually drove him to murder Tsuyoshi.

== Media ==
=== Manga ===
Written and illustrated by Yura Urushibara, Tougen Anki: Legend of the Cursed Blood started in Akita Shoten's shōnen manga magazine Weekly Shōnen Champion on June 11, 2020. Akita Shoten has collected its chapters into individual tankōbon volumes. The first volume was released on October 8, 2020. As of October 2026, thirty-one volumes have been released.

In March 2024, Yen Press announced that they had licensed the manga for English release in North America, with the first volume released on September 17 of that same year.

A spin-off manga by Dōma Oda, titled Tougen Anki Gaiden: Tsuki to Sakura no Kyōsō Kyoku (桃源暗鬼外伝 月と桜の狂騒曲; lit. 'Tougen Anki Side Story: The Rhapsody of the Moon and Cherry Blossoms'), started serialization in Monthly Shōnen Champion on June 6, 2025. The first tankōbon volume was released on December 8, 2025. As of July 2026, two volumes have been released.

==== Volumes ====
===== Tougen Anki: Legend of the Cursed Blood =====
No.	Original release date	Original ISBN	English release date	English ISBN
1	October 8, 2020	978-4-253-28001-3	September 17, 2024	978-1-9753-9990-0
1. "An Oni's Blood" (鬼の血, Oni no Chi); 2. "The Momotarou Agency" (桃太郎機関, Momotarou Kikan); 3. "Too Bad" (残念だったな, Zannen Dattana); 4. "All-Star Lineup" (粒揃い, Tsubuzoroi); 5. "Just Keep Winning" (成し遂げたいなら、勝ち続けろ, Nashi Togetainara, Kachi Tsuzukero); 6. "Blood Eclipse Release" (血蝕解放, Kesshoku Kaihō)
2	January 8, 2021	978-4-253-28002-0	January 21, 2025	978-1-9753-9992-4
7. "She'll Kill You..." (殺しちゃうので･･･, Koroshi Chaunode...); 8. "Can't Just Leave You Behind" (ほっとけねぇだろ, Hottoke Nēdaro); 9. "Now... It's My Turn" (俺は･･･ここからだ!, Ore wa... Koko Karada!); 10. "Not My Problem" (俺には関係ない, Ore ni wa Kankeinai); 11. "Your Father" (お前の父親, Omae no Chichioya); 12. "Work with Me" (協力しろ, Kyōryoku Shiro); 13. "You Go for the Goal" (お前がゴールしろ, Omae ga Gōru Shiro); 14. "Scary Guys" (ヤバイ奴, Yabai Yatsu); 15. "Kyouya Oiranzaka" (花魁坂京夜, Oiranzaka Kyōya)
3	March 8, 2021	978-4-253-28003-7	June 17, 2025	978-1-9753-9994-8
16. "This Is My Battlefield" (ここが俺の戦場, Koko ga Ore no Senjō); 17. "Makes Me Sick" (胸くそ悪いにも程がある, Munekuso Warui ni mo Hodo ga Aru); 18. "As Depraves As It Gets" (外の道にも限度があるだろう, Soto no Michi ni mo Gendo ga Aru Darou); 19. "I'll Be the Bad Guy" (悪でいい, Akudeī); 20. "Pretty Girls Are a Handful" (美人は手強い, Bijin wa Tegowai); 21. "All the Pieces Are in Place" (準備は整った, Junbi wa Totonotta); 22. "An Overly Devoted Woman" (尽くし過ぎる女, Tsukushi Sugiru Onna); 23. "Pure and Dreadful Devotion" (純情で異常な愛情(アイラブ), Ai Rabu); 24. "No Way, No Way, No Way" (無理無理無理, Muri Muri Muri)
4	June 8, 2021	978-4-253-28004-4	November 4, 2025	978-1-9753-9996-2
25. "Unreliable Heroic Tales" (頼りない武勇伝, Tayorinai Buyūden); 26. "Pretty Cool, Right?" (格好良いだろう, Kakkōii Darō); 27. "You Scared?" (ビビったのか？, Bibitta no ka?); 28. "What Will Today's Anger Bring?" (今日の怒りは何を生む？, Kyō no Ikari wa Nani o Umu?); 29. "The Problem Is You Aren't Trying to Change" (変わろうとしなことが問題, Kawarou to Shina Koto ga Mondai); 30. "A Momotarou Soul" (桃太郎魂, Momotarō Damashī); 31. "The Kishin's Child" (鬼神の子, Kishin no Ko); 32. "Because I Have a Heart" (心があるから, Kokoro ga Arukara); 33. "You Can Do It!!!" (頑張れ!!!, Ganbare!!!)
5	August 6, 2021	978-4-253-28005-1	May 26, 2026	978-1-9753-9998-6
34. "I Hate This Guy" (この男が嫌いだ, Kono Otoko ga Kirai da); 35. "Thanks!" (ありがとう！, Arigatō!); 36. "Choosing Rooms" (部屋決め, Heya Gime); 37. "Mikado, Spelled Like 'Gate of God'" (神の門で神(み)門(かど), Kami no Mon de Mikado); 38. "What If..." (もしも, Moshimo); 39. "My Rule" (自分ルール, Jibun Rūru); 40. "Thank Goodness" (よかった, Yokatta); 41. "Nerima Ward Overseer" (練馬区担当, Nerima-ku Tantō); 42. "Conviction" (覚悟, Kakugo)
6	October 8, 2021	978-4-253-28006-8	November 24, 2026	979-8-8554-0001-4
43. "Smooth" (順調, Junchō); 44. "The Gang's All Here" (みーつけた, Mītsuketa); 45. "Just You and Me" (2人きり, Futari Kiri); 46. "Cloudburst Cascade" (繚乱時雨, Ryōran Shigure); 47. "The Moonlight Will Shine Upon Your Corpse" (月光がお前の死を受け入れてくれる, Gekkō ga Omae no Shi o Ukeirete Kureru); 48. "Not Bad" (悪くない, Warukunai); 49. "According to My Vision" (全ては俺の思うまま, Subete wa Ore no Omou Mama); 50. "The Oni of Vengeance" (怨みの鬼, Urami no Oni); 51. "Doubt" (疑惑, Giwaku)
7	December 8, 2021	978-4-253-28007-5	—	—
52. Gishin Anki (疑心暗鬼); 53. Hishō (悲傷); 54. Jaku-sha no Koe (弱者の声); 55. Magarikado (曲がり角); 56. Waraeyo (笑えよ); 57. Ore ga Yaru (俺がやる); 58. Ikari bāsasu Ikari (怒VS怒); 59. Odorouze (踊ろうぜ); 60. Yoru wa Nagaize? (夜は長いぜ？)
8	March 8, 2022	978-4-253-28008-2	—	—
61. Pāfekuto obu Unsei (パーフェクト of 運勢); 62. Kami wa Boku ni Kugizukesa (神は僕に釘付けさ); 63. Kami Gotoki (神ごとき); 64. Arienai (ありえない); 65. Munashī Tatakai (虚しい闘い); 66. Genkai (限界); 67. Sayōnara (さようなら); 68. Tomo yo (友よ); 69. Warukunē (悪くねぇ)
9	May 6, 2022	978-4-253-28009-9	—	—
70. Akuma (悪魔); 71. Baka da... (バカだ･･･); 72. Shinanai de Kure (死なないでくれ); 73. Boku ni Dekiru Koto (僕にできること); 74. Hoshikattamono (欲しかったもの); 75. Sekinin (責任); 76. Futatabi no Tameni (再びのために); 77. Eigyūteki Mikansei (永久的未完成); 78. Gō! Gō! Yukiyama (GO!GO!雪山)
10	July 7, 2022	978-4-253-28010-5	—	—
79. Innami (印南); 80. Yoteigai (予定外); 81. Tsuyosa e no Michisuji (強さへの道すじ); 82. Funbari Dokoro (ふんばり所); 83. Ikiru to wa Seichōshi Tsuzukeru Koto (生きるとは成長し続けること); 84. Kizuato (傷跡); 85. Īkao (いい顔); 86. Fukuro Kōji (袋小路); 87. Renkei (連携)
11	September 8, 2022	978-4-253-28011-2	—	—
88. Igi (意義); 89. Aratana Chi (新たな血); 90. Kishin no Ko "Todoroki Hayate" (鬼神の子｢等々力 瀬｣); 91. Abayo (あばよ); 92. Nattoku de Kinē (納得できねぇ); 93. Shinten Chi (新天血); 94. Yakan Hikō (夜間飛行); 95. Chichi Toshite (父として); 96. Zureta Pinto (ズレたピント)
12	November 8, 2022	978-4-253-28012-9	—	—
97. Chigēdaro (ちげぇだろ); 98. Todoroki no Ketsui (等々力の決意); 99. Kujo Kanryō (駆除完了); 100. Yudansuru na!! Hikishimero!! (油断するな!! 引き締めろ!!); 101. Senaka (背中); 102. Chō to Han (丁と半); 103. Mendō Goto (めんどーごと); 104. Tōchaku (到着); 105. Sorezore no Michi (それぞれの道)
13	January 6, 2023	978-4-253-28013-6	—	—
14	April 7, 2023	978-4-253-28014-3	—	—
15	June 8, 2023	978-4-253-28015-0	—	—
16	August 8, 2023	978-4-253-28016-7	—	—
17	November 8, 2023	978-4-253-28017-4	—	—
18	January 5, 2024	978-4-253-28018-1	—	—
19	March 7, 2024	978-4-253-28019-8	—	—
20	May 8, 2024	978-4-253-28531-5	—	—
21	September 6, 2024	978-4-253-28532-2; 978-4-253-28533-9 (SE)	—	—
22	January 8, 2025	978-4-253-28534-6; 978-4-253-28535-3 (SE)	—	—
23	April 8, 2025	978-4-253-28537-7; 978-4-253-28536-0 (SE)	—	—
24	June 6, 2025	978-4-253-28539-1; 978-4-253-28538-4 (SE)	—	—
25	July 8, 2025	978-4-253-28541-4; 978-4-253-28540-7 (SE)	—	—
26	October 8, 2025	978-4-253-00451-0	—	—
27	December 8, 2025	978-4-253-00896-9	—	—
28	February 6, 2026	978-4-253-01142-6	—	—
29	April 8, 2026	978-4-253-01272-0	—	—
30	July 8, 2026	978-4-253-01793-0; 978-4-253-01861-6 (SE)	—	—
31	October 7, 2026	978-4-253-02006-0	—	—

===== Tougen Anki Gaiden: Tsuki to Sakura no Kyōsō Kyoku =====
No.	Release date	ISBN
1	December 8, 2025	978-4-253-00912-6
2	July 8, 2026	978-4-253-01797-8

=== Stage play ===
In December 2023, it was announced that the series would receive a stage play adaptation, which ran at the Tennozu Galaxy Theater in Tokyo from February 17 to 24, 2024, and at the Umeda Arts Theater's Theater Drama City in Osaka from February 29 to March 3 of the same year.

=== Anime ===
In May 2024, it was announced that the series would receive an anime television series adaptation. It was produced by Studio Hibari and directed by Ato Nonaka, with Hiroyuki Hashimoto serving as assistant director, Yukie Sugawara handling series composition, character designs by Ryoko Amisaki, with him also serving as chief animation director alongside Yopi, and music composed by Kohta Yamamoto through Pony Canyon. The first season aired from July 11 to December 26, 2025, on the Friday Anime Night programming block on Nippon TV and its NNS affiliates. For the first cours, the opening theme song is "Overnight", performed by the Oral Cigarettes, while the ending theme song is "What Is Justice?", performed by Band-Maid. For the second cours, featuring the "Nerima Arc", the opening theme song is "Amidakuji" (阿弥陀籤), performed by Chogakusei, while the ending theme song is "Action", performed by Eill.

Immediately following the broadcast of the first season finale, a second season subtitled Nikko Kegon Falls Arc was announced. The first cours premiered on October 2, 2026, on the same programming block, while the second cours is set to premiere in April 2027. For the first part, the opening theme song is "Backlash", performed by Hiromitsu Kitayama, while the ending theme song is "Hand in Hand", performed by Track15.

Remow licensed the series for a worldwide simulcast on Crunchyroll, Amazon Prime Video (in select territories), Netflix (excluding Japan), and other streaming services.

==== Episodes ====
===== Season 1 (2025) =====
No. overall	No. in season	Title	Directed by (Note: Production staff information is taken from the ending credits of each episode.)	Written by	Storyboarded by	Original release date
1	1	"Oni's Blood"; Transliteration: "Oni no Chi" (Japanese: 鬼の血)	Yū Kinome & Ato Nonaka	Yukie Sugawara	Yū Kinome & Ato Nonaka	July 11, 2025
2	2	"If You Want to Make It, Keep On Winning"; Transliteration: "Nashitogetai Nara, Kachi Tsudzukero" (Japanese: 成し遂げたいなら、 勝ち続けろ)	Ato Nonaka	Yukie Sugawara	Yū Kinome & Ato Nonaka	July 18, 2025
3	3	"Blood Eclipse Release"; Transliteration: "Kesshoku Kaihō" (Japanese: 血蝕解放)	Yoshitsugu Kimura	Yukie Sugawara	Yui Miura	July 25, 2025
4	4	"Work with Me"; Transliteration: "Kyōryoku Shiro" (Japanese: 協力しろ)	Masaru Kanemori	Yukie Sugawara	Yō Nakano & Ato Nonaka	August 1, 2025
5	5	"Bad News"; Transliteration: "Yabai Yatsu" (Japanese: ヤバい奴)	Yū Kinome & Ato Nonaka	Yū Kinome	Yū Kinome	August 8, 2025
6	6	"Even the Loner Path Has Its Limits"; Transliteration: "Soto no Michi ni mo Gendo ga Aru Darou" (Japanese: 外の道にも限度があるだろう)	Atsuji Tanizawa	Daisuke Tazawa	Yō Nakano	August 15, 2025
7	7	"The Beauty Is a Beast"; Transliteration: "Bijin wa Tegowai" (Japanese: 美人は手ごわい)	Yoshitsugu Kimura & Ken Yoshino	Daisuke Tazawa	Shinichi Fukumoto & Ken Yoshino	August 22, 2025
8	8	"The Unreliable Hero"; Transliteration: "Tayorinai Buyūden" (Japanese: 頼りない武勇伝)	Masaru Kanemori	Daisuke Tazawa	Yō Nakano	August 29, 2025
9	9	"Momotaro Spirit"; Transliteration: "Momotarō Tamashī" (Japanese: 桃太郎魂)	Atsuji Tanizawa	Yukie Sugawara	Yō Nakano	September 5, 2025
10	10	"Kishin's Child"; Transliteration: "Kishin no Ko" (Japanese: 鬼神の子)	Hyeon Dae Song & Masaru Kanamori	Yukie Sugawara	Yui Miura	September 12, 2025
11	11	"Thank You!"; Transliteration: "Arigatō!" (Japanese: ありがとう!)	Yusuke Kamata	Yukie Sugawara	Hideki Okamoto	September 19, 2025
12	12	"Day of the Storm"; Transliteration: "Arashi no Hi" (Japanese: 嵐の日)	Tomohiro Matsukawa	Yukie Sugawara	Noriaki Saito	September 26, 2025
13	13	"Mikado, Like the Gate of the Gods"; Transliteration: "Kami no Mon de Mikado" (Japanese: 神の門で神門)	Masaru Kanemori	Yukie Sugawara	Ato Nonaka	October 3, 2025
14	14	"Personal Rule"; Transliteration: "Jibun Rūru" (Japanese: 自分ルール)	Yoshitsugu Kimura	Daisuke Tazawa	Yoshitsugu Kimura	October 10, 2025
15	15	"Found You"; Transliteration: "Mītsuketa" (Japanese: みーつけた)	Atsuji Tanizawa	Yukie Sugawara	Yō Nakano	October 24, 2025 (Note: Episode 15 was delayed one week from its originally scheduled air date of October 17, 2025.)
16	16	"Not So Bad"; Transliteration: "Warukunai" (Japanese: 悪くない)	Yoshitsugu Kimura	Yukie Sugawara	Yō Nakano	October 31, 2025
17	17	"The Vengeful Oni"; Transliteration: "Urami no Oni" (Japanese: 怨みの鬼)	Hitomi Ezoe	Yukie Sugawara	Makoto Ogihara	November 7, 2025
18	18	"Haunted By Doubt"; Transliteration: "Gishin'angi" (Japanese: 疑心暗鬼)	Masaru Kanemori	Yukie Sugawara	Yō Nakano	November 14, 2025
19	19	"The Voice of the Weak"; Transliteration: "Jakusha no Koe" (Japanese: 弱者の声)	Yoshitsugu Kimura	Yukie Sugawara	Yō Nakano	November 21, 2025
20	20	"Rage vs. Rage"; Transliteration: "Ikari bāsasu Ikari" (Japanese: 怒VS怒)	Atsuji Tanizawa	Yukie Sugawara	Makoto Ogihara	November 28, 2025
21	21	"Flawless Fortune"; Transliteration: "Pāfekuto ofu Unsei" (Japanese: パーフェクト of 運勢)	Tomohiro Matsukawa	Yū Kinome	Tomohiro Matsukawa	December 5, 2025
22	22	"A Futile Battle"; Transliteration: "Munashī Tatakai" (Japanese: 虚しい闘い)	Yusuke Kamata	Yukie Sugawara	Yui Miura	December 12, 2025
23	23	"My Friend"; Transliteration: "Tomoyo" (Japanese: 友よ)	Yusuke Kamata	Yukie Sugawara	Hatsuki Tsuji	December 19, 2025
24	24	"Until We Meet Again"; Transliteration: "Mata no Tame ni" (Japanese: 再びのために)	Masaru Kanemori	Yukie Sugawara	Yō Nakano	December 26, 2025

===== Season 2: Nikko Kegon Falls Arc (2026) =====
No. overall	No. in season	Title	Directed by	Written by	Storyboarded by	Original release date
Part 1
25	1	"Let the Training Begin!"; Transliteration: "Shugyō Kaishi" (Japanese: 修行開始)	Yoshitsugu Kimura	Yukie Sugawara	Ato Nonaka	October 2, 2026
26	2	"The Path to Growing Strong"; Transliteration: "Tsuyosa e no Michisuji" (Japanese: 強さへの道すじ)	Masaru Kanamori	Yukie Sugawara	Yui Miura	October 9, 2026
27	3	"Purpose"; Transliteration: "Igi" (Japanese: 意義)	Ken Yoshino	Atsuko Aizawa	Ken Yoshino	October 16, 2026
28	4	"Child of Kishin: Hayate Todoroki"; Transliteration: "Kishin no Ko 'Todoroki Hayate'" (Japanese: 鬼神の子｢等々力 颯｣)	Tomohiro Matsukawa	Yukie Sugawara	Hatsuki Tsuji	October 23, 2026
29	5	"New Blood"; Transliteration: "Shintenchi" (Japanese: 新天血)	Shota Hamada	Yukie Sugawara	Shota Hamada	October 30, 2026
30	6	"Out of Focus"; Transliteration: "Zureta Pinto" (Japanese: ズレたピント)	Atsuji Tanizawa	Yukie Sugawara	Yō Nakano	November 6, 2026
31	7	"The General's Back"; Transliteration: "Senaka" (Japanese: 背中)	Lisa Notaro	Yukie Sugawara	Hatsuki Tsuji	November 13, 2026
32	8	"One's Own Way"; Transliteration: "Sorezore no Michi" (Japanese: それぞれの道)	Hazuki Mizumoto & Onimura Momoichirō	Atsuko Aizawa	Yui Miura	November 20, 2026
33	9	Transliteration: "Mikkusu Raibu" (Japanese: ミックスライブ)	TBA	TBA	TBA	November 27, 2026

=== Video game ===
A role-playing video game adaptation by Com2uS, titled Tougen Anki: Crimson Inferno (桃源暗鬼 Crimson Inferno), was announced in March 2025 for mobile devices and PC. It was unveiled at Tokyo Game Show 2025.

== Reception ==
By February 2022, the manga had over 1.2 million copies in circulation; over 1.85 million copies in circulation by November 2022; over 2.2 million copies in circulation by March 2023; over 2.6 million copies in circulation by December 2023; over 3 million copies in circulation by May 2024; and over 6 million copies in circulation by July 2026.

The manga was nominated for the 2021 Next Manga Awards in the print category. The manga placed seventh in Rakuten Kobo's second E-book Award in the "I Want to Deliver It to the World! Top Recommended Manga" category in 2024.
