= Koutaro Nishiyama =

Japanese voice actor and singer (born 1991)

- 西山 宏太朗
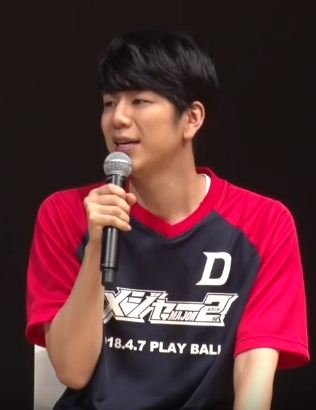
- Nishiyama at Nerima Anime Carnival 2018
- Born: October 11, 1991 (age 35); Yokohama, Kanagawa Prefecture, Japan
- Occupation: Voice actor
- Years active: 2011–present
- Agent: 81 Produce
- Musical career
- Genre: J-pop
- Instrument: Vocals
- Years active: 2020–present
- Label: Lantis
- Website: https://www.lantis.jp/nishiyamakoutaro/

Koutaro Nishiyama (西山 宏太朗, Nishiyama Kōtarō; born October 11, 1991) is a Japanese voice actor and singer from Kanagawa Prefecture, Japan. He is currently affiliated with 81 Produce. His major roles are Atsushi Kinugawa in Cute High Earth Defense Club Love!, Sakutaro Kirara in Jewelpet: Magical Change, Kazunori Uesugi in Tantei Team KZ Jiken Note, Yoshiharu Hisomu in Kiznaiver and Ryūichi Kashima in School Babysitters. In 2018, he won the Best New Actor Award at the 12th Seiyu Awards.

== Biography ==
Nishiyama wanted to work using his voice since his 6th year of elementary school; in junior high school, he was suggested by a friend to become a voice actor. During high school, he participated in the Creative Course (which included voice actor and broadcast major) of his school. In 2009, while in high school, he participated in NHK's nationwide high school broadcast competition.

In 2009, he participated in the 3rd 81 Audition and won a special award, after which he entered 81 Produce's training school. In May 2011, he joined the company 81 Produce. In 2015, he launched the entertainment group "Ooimachi Cream Soda" along with Reona Irie and Yuu Taniguchi. As part of Ooimachi Cream Soda, Nishiyama also acts in various stage plays.

In 2016, Nishiyama released his first personal book Nishiyama-san Chi no Koutaro-kun. In 2017, he published a photo essay book Tarorizumu. In 2018, he won the Best New Actor Award at the 12th Seiyuu Awards. Nishiyama shared the award with Taku Yashiro and Shun Horie.

In 2020, Nishiyama made his debut as singer from Lantis with mini album City.

== Filmography ==
=== Anime ===
List of voice performances in anime
Year	Title	Role	Notes	Source
2012	Sankarea: Undying Love	Well-rounded man		
2012	Accel World	Man 1		
2012	Kokoro Connect	Male student		
2012	Beyblade: Shogun Steel	Blader B		
2013	The Severing Crime Edge	Schoolboy		
2013	Hayate the Combat Butler! Cuties	Staff		
2013	Stella Women's Academy, High School Division Class C^{3}	Enemy, customer		
2013	Voice Acting Sentai Boystome 7 ja:声優戦隊ボイストーム7	Delusion beast coryge 妄想獣コージ		
2014	D-Frag!	Matsuhisa		
2014	No-Rin	Student		
2014–15	Haikyū!! series	Kazuhito Narita, Kawashima		
2014	Free!	Toru Iwashimizu		
2014	Blue Spring Ride	Junior high school boy		
2014	When Supernatural Battles Became Commonplace	Student		
2014	Psycho-Pass 2	Man		
2014	Your Lie in April	Soccer club member		
2015–17	Cute High Earth Defense Club Love!	Atsushi Kinugawa	Also LOVE! LOVE! (Season 2), LOVE! LOVE! LOVE! (OVA)	
2015	The Disappearance of Nagato Yuki-chan	Baseball staff, male teacher		
2015	Jewelpet: Magical Change	Sakutaro Kirara		
2015	Rin-ne	Boy		
2015	Overlord	Bellote		
2015	Noragami Aragoto	Suzuha		
2015	Star-Myu	Student		
2015	Tantei Team KZ Jiken Note	Kazunori Uesugi		
2016	Haruchika	Kōji Iwasaki		
2016	Kiznaiver	Yoshiharu Hisomu		
2016	High School Fleet	Oga		
2016	Servamp	Koyuki		
2016	Fudanshi Kōkō Seikatsu	Daigo		
2016	91 Days	Frate Vanetti		
2016	Time Travel Girl	Leone レオーネ		
2016	All Out!!	Yuto Keta		
2016	Whistle! 2016 Version	Yūsuke Morinaga		
2017	Sagrada Reset	Hitsūchikun		
2017	Nui Nui Hinobori San Kyoudai	Aoi Hinobori	Web anime	
2017	Blame! (film)	Shige	Theatrical film	
2017	Free!-Timeless Medley- the Promise	Toru Iwashimizu	Theatrical film	
2017	Warau Salesman NEW	Tomoyoshi Doraki		
2017	Convenience Store Boy Friends	Keiichi Miki		
2017	TSUKIPRO THE ANIMATION	Eichi Horimiya		
2017	Karada Sagashi (ONA)	Shōta Uranishi	ONA	
2017	100 Sleeping Princes and the Kingdom of Dreams: Short Stories	Xiao	ONA	
2017	Sengoku Night Blood	Masatoyo Naitou		
2018	School Babysitters	Ryūichi Kashima		
2018	Hataraku Oniisan!	Angoramori-senpai		
2018	Major 2nd	Hikaru Satō		
2018	Moshi Moshi, Terumi Desu	Rintarō		
2018	The Thousand Musketeers	Lorenz		
2018	Mr. Tonegawa: Middle Management Blues	Toshimasa Kawasaki		
2018	Zoids Wild	Garlic		
2018	Skull-face Bookseller Honda-san	Kendo		
2018	Ace Attorney Season 2	Yūsaku Amasugi		
2019	B-PROJECT: Zecchou Emotion	Yuduki Teramitsu		
2019	The Price of Smiles	Alan		
2019	I'm From Japan	Tokio Abiko		
2019	Mix	Ryō Akai		
2019	Million Arthur (TV series)	Andy		
2019	Ensemble Stars!	Kanata Shinkai		
2019	BEM	Roddy Walker		
2019	Stand My Heroes: Piece of Truth	Kyōsuke Tsuzuki		
2020	A3! Season Spring & Summer	Tsuzuru Minagi		
2020	Sing "Yesterday" for Me	Amamiya		
2020	Get Up! Get Live!	Kaede Higashizawa		
2020	Major 2nd Season 2	Hikaru Satō/ Hikaru Sakaguchi		
2020	Sakura Kakumei ~Hana Saku Otome-tachi~ Special Animation	Yoshitaka Ooishi	ONA	
2020	Aware! Meisaku-kun	Tsumire		
2021	I-Chu: Halfway Through the Idol	Saku Uruha		
2021	MAZICA PARTY	Silver		
2021	Dragon Goes House-Hunting	Archer		
2021	Re-Main	Eitarō Oka		
2021	TSUKIPRO THE ANIMATION 2	Eichi Horimiya		
2021	Muteking the Dancing Hero	Winter		
2021	The Vampire Dies in No Time	Sagyō		
2021- 2023	IDOLiSH7 Third Beat!	Minami Natsume	(also Part 2)	
2022	The Heike Story	Emperor Takakura		
2022	Fushigi Dagashiya Zenitendō	Tetsushi Soga		
2022	Kotaro Lives Alone	Tamamori	ONA	
2022	She Professed Herself Pupil of the Wise Man	Eisenfald		
2022	Dance Dance Danseur	Yamato Takura		
2022	Aoashi	Junnosuke Nakano		
2022	Heroines Run the Show	Third year male student B		
2022	Shoot! Goal to the Future	Fuyi Itoda		
2022	Penpe to Pinpi	Penpe	ONA, also director and screenwriter	
2022	Roly Poly Peoples	Roly	ONA	
2023	The Vampire Dies in No Time Season 2	Sagyō		
2023	High Card	Jasper Libera		
2023	The Tale of the Outcasts	Shura		
2023	The Ancient Magus' Bride Season 2	Isaac Farrar		
2023	Mix: Meisei Story Season 2	Ryō Akai		
2023	My Happy Marriage	Kōji Tatsuishi		
2023	Case Closed	Takashi Nakajima		
2023	The Tale of the Outcasts	Shura		
2023	Ensemble Stars!! Tsuioku Selection 'Element'	Kanata Shinkai	ONA	
2023	My New Boss Is Goofy	Kentarō Momose		
2023	B-Project Passion*Love Call	Yuduki Teramitsu		
2024	Egumi Legacy	Uninvited Guest		
2024	Re:Zero season 3	Muse Kiritaka		
2025	Cute High Earth Defense Club Eternal Love!	Atsushi Kinugawa	Theatrical film	
2025	Everyday Host	Shin		
2025	Wind Breaker	Takumi Momose		
2025	Tougen Anki	Jin Kougasaki		
2025	With You, Our Love Will Make It Through	Yukihiro Aida		
2026	Hana-Kimi	Wataru Nihonbashi		
2027	Matsurika Kanriden	Shisei Hō		

=== Video games ===
List of voice performances in video games
Year	Title	Role	Notes	Source
2014	Haikyu!!	Kazuhito Narita	DS	
2015	Ensemble Stars!	Kanata Shinkai		
2015	So Cute it Hurts!!	Todo-kun 藤堂くん	DS	
2015	Future Card Buddyfight: Explosive Fight of Friendship	Makoto Tsukimiya	DS	
2015	Cute High Earth Defense Club Love! Game!	Atsushi Kinugawa		
2015	100 Sleeping Princes and the Kingdom of Dreams	Xiao Riel Kanata Shinkai		
2016	Yunohana Spring! ~Cherishing Time~	Soichiro Futaba		
2016	Suuran Digit	Mitsu Nitou		
2016	Cute High Earth Defense Club Love! Love! Game!	Atsushi Kinugawa		
2016	I-Chu	Saku Uruha		
2016	Icchibanketsu -ONLINE-	Mitsukuni		
2016	Stand My Heroes	Kyōsuke Tsuzuki		
2016	Granblue Fantasy	Wystom		
2016	SOUL REVERSE ZERO	Allen		
2016	Magic-kyun Renaissance	Tokiomi		
2017	Akane Sasu Sekai de Kimi to Utau	Omoikane		
2017	Idolish7	Minami Natsume		
2017	A3!	Tsuzuru Minagi		
2017	TSUKINO PARADISE	Eichi Horimiya		
2017	Sengoku Night Blood	Masatoyo Naitou		
2017	B-PROJECT Muteki*Dangerous	Yuduki Teramitsu		
2017	Captain Tsubasa ~Tatakae Dream Team~	Leo		
2017	Star Revolution ☆ 88 Seiza no Idol Kakumei	Senya Asahina		
2017	Unnamed War 2099	Rumon Ishido		
2018	Akatasuki no Epika -Union Brave-	Iglesia		
2018	Tsumugu Logic	Sosei Morotomiya, Koya Morotomiya		
2018	Namu Amida Butsu! -Rendai UTENA-	Koumokuten, Mekira Taisho		
2019	Hoshinari Echoes	Sui Mizushiro		
2019	Bustafellows	Alex		
2020	Ensemble Stars!! Music	Kanata Shinkai		
2020	Ensemble Stars!! Basic	Kanata Shinkai		
2020	Granblue Fantasy	Justin		
2020	Digimon ReArise	Bearmon		
2020	Sakura Kakumei ~Hana Saku Otome-tachi~	Yoshitaka Ooishi		
2020	Shokumonogatari	Kyoukadori		
2021	B-PROJECT Ryusei*Fantasia	Yuduki Teramitsu		
2021	Touken Ranbu	Himetsuru Ichimonji		
2021	The Thousand Musketeers: Rhodoknight	Lorenz		
2022	Yume Shokunin to Wasureji no Kuro Yousei	Gui		
2022	Jujutsu Kaisen: Phantom Parade	Kaito Yūki		
2022	Echoes of Mana	Kiruto		

=== Drama CD ===
List of voice performances in drama CD
Title	Character
Einsatz	Kotoyo Shinohori
Mahou x Shōnen x Days!!!!! Volume 1	Student
Love Nette Tune Type-05 Higanbana	Higanbana
Iroiro atta ne. ~Supadari shōnika-i Misuzu Yoshinori no baai~	Yoshinori Misuzu
Ohayō kara oyasumi made dai 2-dan toshokan no koi ~bungaku shōjo no madobe~	Satoshi Harima
Gakuen Babysitters	Ryūichi Kashima
SolidS drama CD Volume 2 "-Two of a kind.-"	Eichi Horimiya
Tutti! Frutti!	Yūki Satake
Yoidore no no no vol. 1 ~Kon'na senpai mita koto nai~	Ryō Sawanoi
Otodoke Kareshi Cherish Vol.2	Tamaki Hyojo
B-PROJECT KING OF CASTE ~Sneaking Shadow~	Yuduki Teramitsu
GET UP! GET LIVE! Steam Rising	Kaede Higashizawa
My New Boss is Goofy	Kentaro Momose

List of voice performances in BLCD
Title	Character
Ai no mitsu ni yoe!	Arita
Anata wa taidade yūga	Senior student, men
Immoral Triangle	Kurota Shinozaki
Smells Like Green Spirit	Student
Hang Out Crisis	Shinya Hasumi
Raveled Tightrope Knot	Kariya
Hitorijime Boyfriend	Jirō Yoshida
Empty Sweetie	Yuki
Ambivalence	Aoto Kuji
Jackass!	Hosaka
Blue Sky Complex	Harukawa
Lala no Kekkon Vol.2	Lala's husband
Tashiro-kun, Kimitte Yatsu wa	Maru

=== Dubbing ===
List of voice performances in dubbing
Year	Title	Role	Notes	Source
2012–2015	Thomas & Friends	Scruff		
2013	The To Do List	Cameron Mitchell		
2018	School of Rock	Lawrence Dooley		
2023-2026	Thomas & Friends: All Engines Go	Kenji		

=== Variety shows ===
Year	Network	Title	Remarks
2013 (October 5-December 28)	NTV	Voice Actor Sentai Boystome 7 "cafe*soffive"	Unit "soffive" member
2014	TV Tokyo	Animemashite	Host
2015	Tokyo MX	Tokyo Otome Restaurant Season 2 "Tokyo Otome Patisserie"	Host/Member
2016	Tokyo MX	Eguchi Takuya no Oretachi Datte Iyasaretai!	Assistant
2016	Tokyo MX	Tsukipro ch.	Appearance/Member, season 2
2016	TV Tokyo	Animemashite	Narration
2016-2017	Tokyo MX	Eguchi Takuya no Oretachi Datte Motto Iyasaretai!	Assistant, season 2
2016-2017	Tokyo MX	Nishiyama Koutaro no Sukoyakana Bokura	Personality/MC
2017	Tokyo MX	Eguchi Takuya no Oretachi Datte Mo~tto Iyasaretai!	Assistant, season 3
2017	Tokyo MX	Saito Soma no Wagokoro wo Kimi ni	Narration
2017	Wowow, GyaO!	Sekai-kei Variety Bangumi Boku Koe	Acted in short drama "Kimi no●● ga Sekai o Sukutta koto o Kimi wa Nanimo Shiranai" as Shizuwa Ryuu
2018	Fuji TV	Shouta-sama to Shitsuji Nishiyama no Otawamure	Co-host with Shouta Aoi, Narration
2018	Tokyo MX	Nishiyama Koutaro no Sukoboku Peace	Personality/MC, season 2
2018	NHK BS Premium	Anisong! Premium! 2018	Co-host with Rika Adachi (studio talk part)
2019	Tokyo MX, Wowow, GyaO!	Sekai-kei Variety Bangumi Boku Koe Season 2	Acted in short drama "Kono Yadoya ni Tomari ni Kita Aitsu ga Kono Mura o Sukutte Kurerunja Ne?" as Yamanishi
2019	Tokyo MX	Eguchi Takuya no Oretachi Datte Yappari Iyasaretai!	Assistant, season 4
2019	Niconico, TV Saitama	LIPSS~ Innocent na Sasayaki~	Cast member
2020	Music On! TV	M-ON! SPECIAL "Nishiyama Koutaro" ~CITY~	Personality
2021	Fuji TV	Kaettekita Shouta-sama to Shitsuji Nishiyama no Otawamure	Co-host with Shouta Aoi, Narration

== Publications ==
=== Photobooks ===
Year	Title	Publisher	ISBN
April 29, 2015	Binan Kōkō Chikyū Bōei-bu LOVE! Photobook "Battle Lovers no Nichijou"	Ponycan Books	ISBN 4865291423 ISBN 978-4865291421
April 28, 2016	Personal Book "Nishiyama-san Chi no Koutaro-kun"	Shufu to Seikatsusha	ISBN 4391148595 ISBN 978-4391148596
December 22, 2017	Photo Essay "Tarorizumu"	SHUFUNOTOMO	ISBN 4074269406 ISBN 978-4074269402
August 30, 2018	HACObook 2nd Season "Hansel to Gretel × Nishiyama Koutaro"	Movic	JAN 4549743240411
February 13, 2021	Photobook "Tarorinisuto"	SHUFUNOTOMO	ISBN 978-4-07-442212-8
June 29, 2023	Photobook "Taroritic"	SHUFUNOTOMO	ISBN 978-4074551088

== Discography ==
=== Extended plays ===
List of extended plays, with selected chart positions, sales figures and certifications
Title	Year	Album details	JPN Oricon	JPN Hot	Sales	Certifications
City	2020	Released: October 7, 2020; Label: Lantis; Formats: CD, digital download	7	9	JPN: 10,497 (physical); JPN: 9,894 (downloads & streaming)	—N/a
Laundry	2021	Released: July 21, 2021; Label: Lantis; Formats: CD, digital download	16	-	-	N/A
My Bag	2025	Released: March 14, 2025; Label: Lantis; Formats: CD, digital download	37	-	JPN: 1,445	
"—" denotes releases that did not chart or were not released in that region.

== Awards ==
Year	Award	Result
2009	3rd 81 Audition Special Award	Won
2018	12th Seiyu Awards for Best Newcomer Actor	Won
