= Tantei Team KZ Jiken Note =

Japanese novel and anime series

- Cover of the first Tantei Team KZ Jiken Note novel

探偵チームKZ事件ノート (Tantei Chīmu Kazzu Jiken Nōto)
- Genre: Mystery
- Novel series
- Written by: Hitomi Fujimoto, Ryō Sumitaki
- Illustrated by: Komagata
- Published by: Kodansha
- Original run: 2011 – 2016
- Volumes: 20
- Anime television series
- Directed by: Kazuya Ichikawa
- Written by: Yuka Yamada
- Studio: Signal.MD
- Original network: NHK E
- Original run: October 7, 2015 – January 27, 2016
- Episodes: 16

Tantei Team KZ Jiken Note (探偵チームKZ事件ノート, Tantei Chīmu Kazzu Jiken Nōto; lit. 'Detective Team KZ's Case Notes') is a Japanese children's novel series written by Hitomi Fujimoto and Ryō Sumitaki, and illustrated by Komagata. Kodansha has published twenty volumes since 2011 until the last chapter in February 2016 issue of Nakayoshi magazine. An anime television series adaptation by Signal.MD began airing from October 7, 2015, to January 27, 2016.

== Characters ==
=== Detective Team KZ Members ===
Aya Tachibana (立花 彩, Tachibana Aya)
Voiced by: Yuiko Tatsumi
Aya Tachibana is the protagonist of the series. Her nickname is Aaya (from Tachibana Aya). Before meeting the members of Detective Team KZ, she had no friends. She is very cautious to the people around her and is embarrassed when attention is brought to her. She has a complex about being a neglected middle child. Her best subject is Language and her weakest subject is Mathematics.
She is the Languages expert of the team and is in charge of recording the team's cases in her notebook.
Kazuomi Wakatake (若武 和臣, Wakatake Kazuomi)
Voiced by: Soma Saito
Wakatake is in Soccer Team KZ as the ace striker. He is prideful and likes to be the center of attention. He is called "Wakatake the Wave" because his grades will fluctuate depending on his emotions. As a result of his fluctuating emotions, he fails all of his middle school entrance exams and goes to a public middle school. It is revealed in The Egg Hamburg Steak Knows that he is allergic to pork. Although he wants to be the center of attention, he has a true sense of justice. His father is a lawyer who is currently working in New York.
Wakatake is the leader of Detective Team KZ.
Takakazu Kuroki (黒木 貴和, Kuroki Takakazu)
Voiced by: Takuma Terashima
Kuroki is in Soccer Team KZ with Wakatake and Uesugi and attends the same middle school as Uesugi and Kazuhiko. He is the tallest member of Detective Team KZ and is said to be the most mature as well. He is kind to all women, which may come off to others as flirtatious. Aya consults Kuroki a few times throughout the series. He is also the person to break up fights between Wakatake and Aya or Uesugi. He is the most mysterious of all the characters; no information has been given about his personal life or family life.
He is the "Connections" Expert of Detective Team KZ. He has many friends around the world and gathers information for their cases from these friends.
Kazunori Uesugi (上杉 和典, Uesugi Kazunori)
Voiced by: Koutaro Nishiyama
Uesugi is in Soccer Team KZ with Wakatake and Kuroki and attends the same schools as Kuroki and Kozuka. He is characterized with a pair of glasses. He keeps a calm face and shows little emotion in front of others. He is not honest with his feelings and feels embarrassed when he says something out of his normal stoic personality. In The Backyard Knows, his eyesight gets worse as a result of an eye disease. His chance of a successful surgery is 40% and he is conflicted whether or not to do the surgery. After consulting Kuroki, he goes to Switzerland to have surgery on his eyes. The surgery is successful, and he returns to Japan with his eyesight cured. It is implied in the anime that his love interest is Aya.
He is known as "Uesugi the Number Whiz" because his strength is Mathematics. He is the Analytics Expert of Detective Team KZ.
Kazuhiko Kozuka (小塚 和彦, Kozuka Kazuhiko)
Voiced by: Mitsuhiro Ichiki
Kozuka attends the same middle school as Kuroki and Uesugi. He is the only member of Detective Team KZ other than Aya that is not in Soccer Team KZ because he is bad at sports. Even though he is not on the soccer team, he is very popular and well-known in the cram school. He is a kind person and is almost always in a good mood with a smile on his face. His personality is similar to Aya's and is the second kindest person to Aya. His father is said to be on an overseas business trip, so he lives together with his aunt and three girls. He admits to Aya that he feels like he has become weak because of this and overcomes this fear with her.
He is known as "Kozuka of Socials and Sciences" because he specializes in Science and Social Studies. In Detective Team KZ, he borrows his father's laboratory to run tests on any DNA samples and evidence that the team finds on cases.
Tasuku Mikado (美門 翼, Mikado Tasuku)
Tasuku is a character only introduced in the novel series. He transfers into Aya's class and is described as "perfect". He wears a face mask because of his keen sense of smell. He is very similar to Aya and is close to her. In the sixteenth novel of the series, The Red Mask Knows, he becomes a member of Detective Team KZ.

=== Other characters ===
Kakeru Sunahara (砂原 翔, Sunahara Kakeru)
Voiced by: Yuki Kaji
He is introduced in The Egg Hamburg Steak Knows. He attended the same middle school as Aya before transferring out of the middle school. He was once in Soccer Team KZ, but was forced to quit because of the bad rumors going around about him. He was rumored to be a dangerous person who will get into trouble, but he is actually kind. The rumors began when he tried to confront a lazy employee from his father's business, Sunahara Meats. He ends up injuring the employee and getting in trouble for it. Sunahara has a strong sense of justice and is mostly misunderstood as a bad person. When Sunahara Meats goes bankrupt, Sunahara leaves the area.
Sunahara returns in The Valentine Knows as a member of a gang. He deliberately acts cold to Aya to avoid her getting involved with the crimes of the gang. It is revealed that he joined the group in order to gather evidence of the crimes to get the money his uncle lost to the gang's scam back. At the end, he leaves the area again, but promises Aya that they can see each other again. It is implied in the anime that his love interest is Aya.
He is treated as a Detective Team KZ member in the anime, though he is not an official member in the novels.

== Media ==
=== Episode list ===
No.	Title	Original release date
1	"The Missing Bike Knows, Part 1" "Kieta Jitensha wa Shitteiru Sono 1" (消えた自転車は知っている その1)	October 7, 2015
2	"The Missing Bike Knows, Part 2" "Kieta Jitensha wa Shitteiru Sono 2" (消えた自転車は知っている その2)	October 14, 2015
3	"The Missing Bike Knows, Part 3" "Kieta Jitensha wa Shitte Iru Sono 3" (消えた自転車は知っている その3)	October 21, 2015
4	"The Missing Bike Knows, Part 4" "Kieta Jitensha wa Shitte Iru Sono 4" (消えた自転車は知っている その4)	October 28, 2015
5	"The Egg Hamburg Steak Knows, Part 1" "Tamago Hamburger wa Shitte Iru Sono 1" (卵ハンバーグは知っている その1)	November 4, 2015
6	"The Egg Hamburg Steak Knows, Part 2" "Tamago Hamburger wa Shitte Iru Sono 2" (卵ハンバーグは知っている その2)	November 11, 2015
7	"The Egg Hamburg Steak Knows, Part 3" "Tamago Hamburger wa Shitte Iru Sono 3" (卵ハンバーグは知っている その3)	November 18, 2015
8	"The Egg Hamburg Steak Knows, Part 4" "Tamago Hamburger wa Shitte Iru Sono 4" (卵ハンバーグは知っている その4)	November 25, 2015
9	"The Backyard Knows. Part 1" "Uraniwa wa Shitte Iru Sono 1" (裏庭は知っている その1)	December 2, 2015
10	"The Backyard Knows. Part 2" "Uraniwa wa Shitte Iru Sono 2" (裏庭は知っている その2)	December 9, 2015
11	"The Backyard Knows. Part 3" "Uraniwa wa Shitte Iru Sono 3" (裏庭は知っている その3)	December 16, 2015
12	"The Backyard Knows. Part 4" "Uraniwa wa Shitte Iru Sono 4" (裏庭は知っている その4)	December 23, 2015
13	"The Valentine Knows. Part 1" "Barentain wa Shitte Iru Sono 1" (バレンタインは知っている その1)	January 6, 2016
14	"The Valentine Knows. Part 2" "Barentain wa Shitte Iru Sono 2" (バレンタインは知っている その2)	January 13, 2016
15	"The Valentine Knows. Part 3" "Barentain wa Shitte Iru Sono 3" (バレンタインは知っている その3)	January 20, 2016
16	"The Valentine Knows. Part 4" "Barentain wa Shitte Iru Sono 4" (バレンタインは知っている その4)	January 27, 2016
