= Attack on Titan (disambiguation) =

Attack on Titan is a Japanese manga series that started in 2009.

Other works in the Attack on Titan franchise include:

- Attack on Titan (TV series), a 2013 animated series
- Attack on Titan (film), a 2015 two-part live-action film
- Attack on Titan (video game), a 2016 video game
- Attack on Titan 2, a 2018 video game
- Attack on Titan: Before the Fall, a 2011 light novel series and its manga adaptation
- Attack on Titan: Counter Rockets, a 2015 live-action web series based on the live-action films
- Attack on Titan: Humanity in Chains, a 2013 video game
- Attack on Titan: Junior High, a 2012 parody manga series and its anime adaptation
- Attack on Titan: Lost Girls, a 2013 visual novel and its adaptations
- Attack on Titan: No Regrets, a 2013 visual novel and its adaptations
