= Mikasa Ackerman =

Fictional character from Attack on Titan

- Attack on Titan character
- Mikasa, as depicted in the Attack on Titan manga
- First appearance: Attack on Titan chapter 1: "To You, 2,000 Years from Now" (2009)
- Last appearance: Attack on Titan chapter 139: "Toward the Tree on That Hill" (2021)
- Created by: Hajime Isayama
- Portrayed by: Kiko Mizuhara
- Voiced by: Japanese: Yui Ishikawa; English: Trina Nishimura

In-universe information
- Family: Mr. Ackerman (father); Mrs. Ackerman (mother); Grisha Yeager (adoptive father); Carla Yeager (adoptive mother); Eren Yeager (Love interest)
- Relatives: Levi Ackerman (distant relative); Kenny Ackerman (distant relative); Kuchel Ackerman (distant relative)

Mikasa Ackerman (Japanese: ミカサ・アッカーマン, Hepburn: Mikasa Akkāman; alt. "Mikasa Ackermann") is a fictional character from Hajime Isayama's manga series Attack on Titan. Mikasa is introduced as a citizen of Paradis Island living with the protagonist, Eren Yeager, and his family, who took her in following the deaths of her parents in an attempted kidnapping. When giant creatures known as Titans invade the area and eat Eren's mother, Mikasa and Eren become members of the Military and join the Survey Corps—an elite group of soldiers who fight Titans outside the walls, whilst studying the physiology of Titans so as to better understand and defend themselves against these creatures. Mikasa's main motivation for fighting is her love for Eren, of whom she is extremely protective. She has also appeared in video games and the anime adaptation.

Isayama based Mikasa on a real person he met before he became a manga artist, keeping the original idea of her being Asian in order to stand out within the Western look-a-like cast. Mikasa is voiced by Yui Ishikawa in the Japanese dub and Trina Nishimura in the English version of the anime. The two voice actresses were surprised by the popularity of their works and the charming aspect of Mikasa despite her usual stoicism.

Mikasa's strong presence received a positive response. Being a member of the Ackermann clan, Mikasa demonstrates an outstanding skill in combat. Though she was praised for her calm personality which contrasts Eren's generally intense behavior, critics were also surprised by the softer side she shows towards Eren. Both voice actresses were also praised by the media.

== Creation and design ==
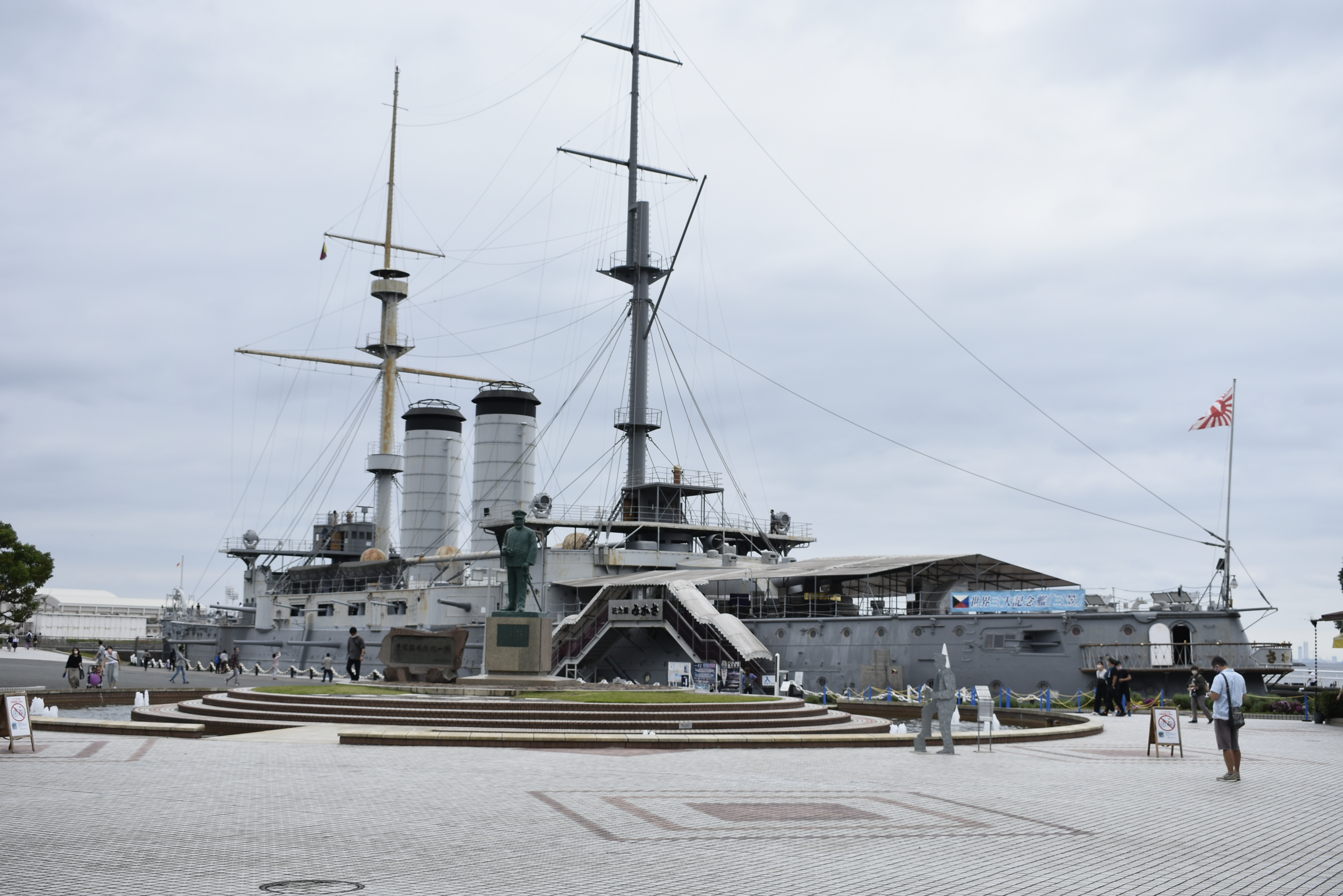
The Mikasa battleship, which served as the inspiration for the character's first name.

After he first moved to Tokyo, Hajime Isayama was working part time and one of his clients became the model of Mikasa. She covered her face with a scarf late at night, and the near mangaka thought this look of hers was endearing. When she came to the store, Isayama came up with the first sketch of the heroine. He was sure that the customer who became Mikasa's model was Asian, contrasting the Western-like characters often seen in the manga, most notably Eren. Only Mikasa's race as someone of Asian descent has been noted. Isayama stated that Mikasa, Levi, and Kenny are all part of the same Ackerman bloodline. However, their reasons for protecting their respective counterparts do not have anything to do with the bloodline itself—"it is just their nature."

There are some parts of Mikasa that are "unrefined", yet on the other hand, she has a brave personality. Isayama believes he was influenced by Casca from Berserk when writing Mikasa. Isayama noted it was generic that a heroine is usually a woman who motivates a man, and that he did not really like that way of thinking. Although there are differences between the skeletal structure and muscle count of men and women which affects their physical strength, Isayama did not find that interesting, which is why he made Mikasa a woman who excels in combat. Isayama also claimed that he intended for Mikasa's character development to be about her separating from Eren and returning to the same girl she used to be during her childhood. Isayama said Mikasa and Armin had developed a habitual mindset of revolving around Eren and wishing to help him, and that in the future, his intention was to have the friends oppose one another. Mikasa's name is noted to come from the Mikasa, a famous pre-dreadnought battleship of the Imperial Japanese Navy. Mikasa's surname is derived from the Yiddish cognate of German name "Ackermann" ("Ackerman" in Yiddish) meaning "one who works the fields."

=== Casting ===
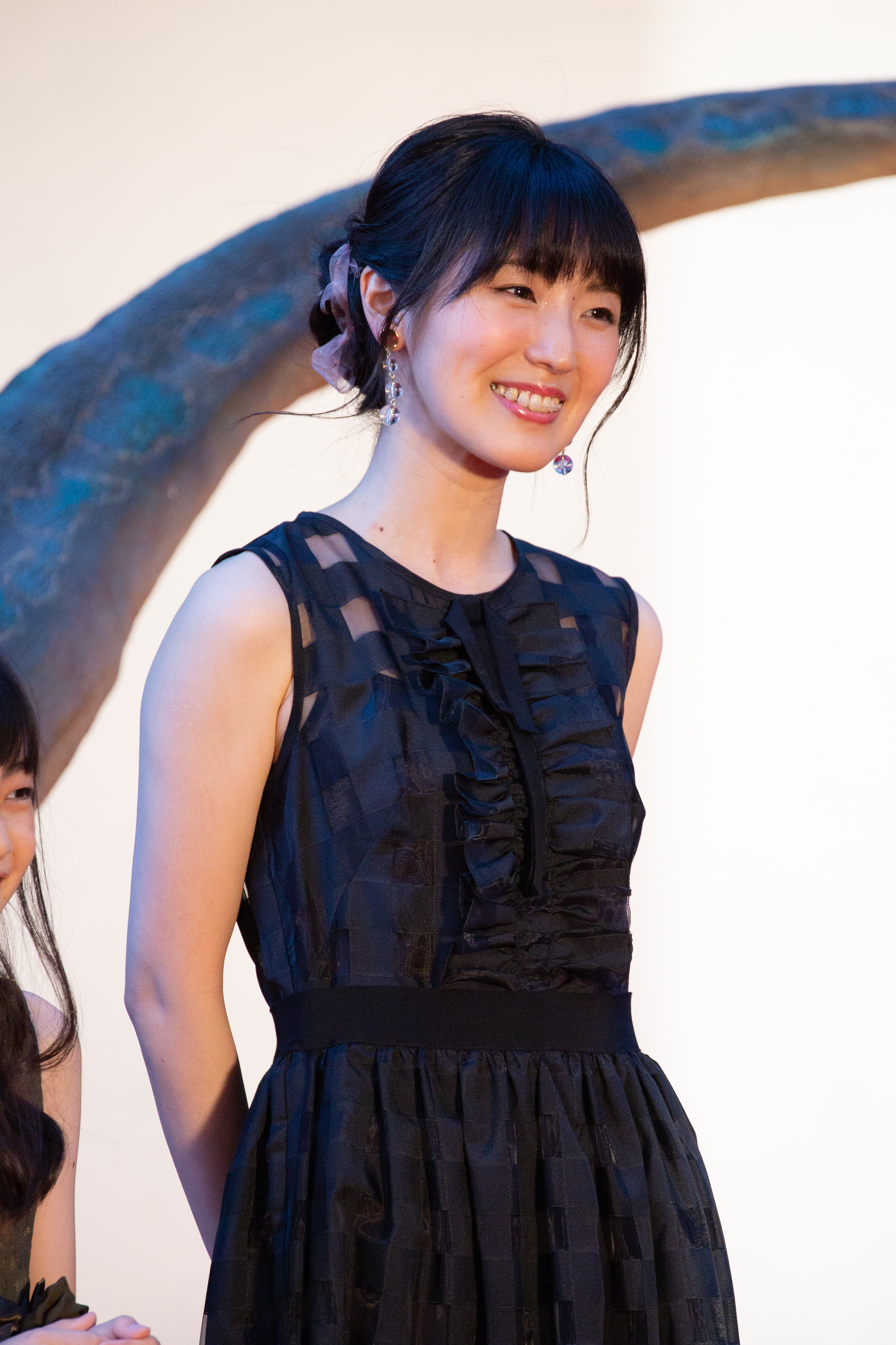
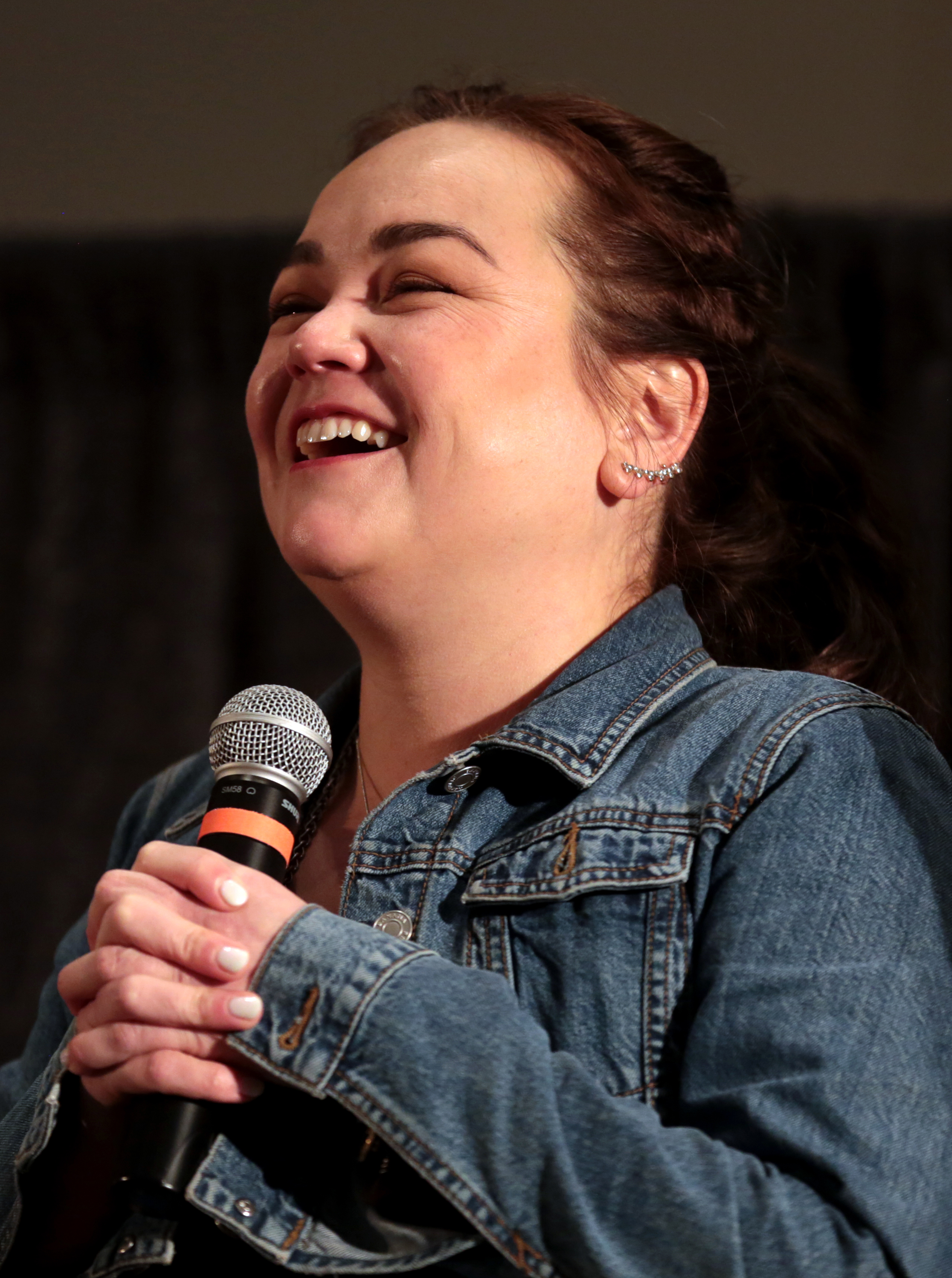
Yui Ishikawa (left) and Trina Nishimura voice Mikasa in Japanese and English, respectively.

Mikasa is voiced by Yui Ishikawa in Japanese,^{[GB p.20]} and by Trina Nishimura in the English dub. Ishikawa said that Mikasa cares mainly about Eren, and remains generally aloof from the rest of the world. She says that "While she might seem like a character with so few emotional levels, there are actually many feelings that swirl around her heart."^{[GB p.20]} She did not read the original work until being told about the audition for the anime. Upon reading the Attack on Titan manga, Ishikawa was attracted by the mystery and development of the character. Ishikawa wanted the role for the series and was surprised by the popularity she obtained across the years.

Trina Nishimura learned of the series from her brother, who showed her the first episode of the anime. She was immediately impressed by it. Nishimura expressed pressure when auditioning for the role and was surprised by the large popularity it had. She often listened to recordings of Ishikawa's work to get experience about the portrayal of Mikasa. While recording the series, she avoided reading the manga because it could ruin her work. Like Ishikawa, Nishimura enjoyed Mikasa's love confession for being able to provide comfort to Eren in the middle of a dark scene. Meanwhile, Nishimura often talked with voice actor director Mike McFarland in regards to her work as she had poor views on her own work.

With the coming of the final story arc in the anime adaptation, Nishimura was committed to the new developments of her character, especially in her reintroduction. She befriended Eren's English actor Bryce Papenbrook. During recordings of the final season, Nishimura commented that while Mikasa is not well known for emoting, she notably became sad more often—which Nishimura saw as a major improvement over her earlier characterisation. She suggested that Mikasa should be made to choose between her devotion to the Military and her love for Eren as a result of major developments in the story, but did not want to expand on that. The increasing violence of the series led to Nishimura's fear of Mikasa being killed every time she had to do recording of the series.

In the live-action film, she is portrayed by Kiko Mizuhara. Mizuhara referred to Mikasa as an inspiring character due to her strength as well as caring due to the love she shows towards Eren.

== Appearances ==
=== In Attack on Titan ===
Mikasa is Eren's childhood friend taken in by his family after seeing her parents brutally murdered by human traffickers. She is shown to feel gratitude toward them as caretakers, as well as Eren, who had saved her life and given her an iconic scarf. Before living with the Yeager family, Mikasa had appeared to be a cheerful, outgoing, and gentle child; but her parents' tragic deaths had an overwhelming influence on her, causing her to lose her innocence and realise the world's cruelty. This caused her to become quieter and more withdrawn, maintaining a stoic expression except when it comes to Eren and her friends.^{[GB p. 36]} As Eren's committed caretaker, she feels compelled to follow and protect him at all costs, even joining him in the Survey Corps. Graduating from the Training Corps at the top of her class,^{[ch. 2]} she is regarded by officers as an unprecedented genius and prodigy, easily worth a hundred soldiers in battle.^{[vol. 3, 4]}

As later revealed, this is due to Mikasa's father being a descendant of the Ackerman clan, an Eldian bloodline that was genetically modified to create super soldiers equal to a Titan in strength, originally designed to protect Eldia's king. When under duress, these genetically inherited abilities may allow a descendant access to their ancestors' battle experience. Mikasa's Ackerman instincts were first awakened in the aftermath of her parents' deaths when Eren urged her to 'fight' back against her kidnappers.^{[ch. 6]}^{[ep 6]} Though technically half-blooded, she is also the last known person of Asian descent residing in the Walls. A wrist tattoo of the Azumabito crest inherited from her mother indicates that she is descended from the prominent Azumabito family (アズマビト家, Azumabito-ke), a cadet Shogun branch from the Oriental nation of Hizuru (ヒィズル, Hizuru), whose ancestors migrated from their native land to Paradis as honored ambassadors.^{[ch. 6]}^{[ep 6]}^{[GB p.39]} While investigating Marley's volunteer soldiers with the Survey Corps, Eren reveals to Mikasa that he has always hated being "forced" to become Ackerman's blood slave and protect Eren. In turn, she becomes despondent and removes her scarf from her neck. While still caring for Eren, Mikasa decides to join the alliance to stop Eren's planned genocide on the world. In the climax against Eren's forces, Mikasa experienced a Paths dream of an alternate scenario where she and Eren escaped from the military and are living together. Eren asks her to forget about him upon his death before Mikasa recovers. She puts the scarf back on, deciding she will not fulfill his request and kills him, placing a kiss on his lips, asserting she would see him later. In the aftermath, Eren confesses to Armin that he had actually loved Mikasa and cared for his allies but did not want to drag them into his massacre. Mikasa buries Eren underneath a tree on a hill near Shiganshina District, continuing to visit his grave as she spends the rest of her life in peace, passing on as an old woman while still wearing the scarf Eren gave her.

Overall, Mikasa has gorgeous black hair, dazzling grey eyes. Mikasa has a scar in her right cheek, given by Eren mistakenly during his Titan form. She wears the survey corps uniform along with a red scarf, given by her lover.

=== In other media ===
Mikasa features in multiple video games associated with the Attack on Titan series, including: Attack on Titan, Attack on Titan 2, Valkyrie Connect, Granblue Fantasy, Disgaea RPG, The Alchemist Code, Humanity in Chains, Star Ocean: Anamnesis, and many others. Mikasa also features as an in-game cosmetic in the massive battle royale game, Fortnite.

The character Lisa Simpson of The Simpsons is depicted as Mikasa at the end of the episode "Treehouse of Horror XXV".

Mikasa would feature in several of the opening and ending songs for the Attack on Titan anime. In "Utsukushiki Zankoku na Sekai", Mikasa is depicted throughout, with visuals depicting her characterization. This ending song would be mirrored in the later ending "Akuma no Ko", in which Eren's characterization is depicted. In "Itterashi", the final ending song of the series, Eren and Mikasa are depicted reuniting.

Mikasa, together with Eren and Levi, featured in an epic collaboration of Mobile Legends: Bang Bang and the anime in January 2024 with Mikasa herself appears as a skin for Fanny, who assemble herself in appearance and fighting since its release on September 30, 2016.

== Reception ==
=== Popularity ===
Mikasa has become a popular character. She was awarded "Female Character" in the Newtype 2013 awards. In the Newtype Anime Awards 2016–2017, Mikasa took fourth in the favorite female character category. In the Anime Awards Selecta Visión, she took the award of "Best Female Lead Character". Yui Ishikawa won the "Best Supporting Actress" for her work as Mikasa Ackerman in the 8th Seiyu Awards. In the 36th Anime Grand Prix she was second in "Best Female Character". In the 3rd BTVA Anime Dub Awards, Mikasa's actress Trina Nishimura also won for her English dub. In the Funimation's Decade of Anime fan poll, Mikasa was voted as one of the five recipients for the "Best Girls of the Decade" category.

=== Critical response ===
The characterisation of Mikasa was praised by Anime News Network for standing out as a skilled heroine and mentioned that her emotional moments involve her devotion towards Eren. Furthermore, the writer believes the spin-offs show how different Mikasa's personality would be had she met Eren on different situations which makes her original persona more appealing. Blu-ray.com saw that the origins of Mikasa and Eren is especially violent, most notably when the protagonists become soldiers. Her characterisation in the episode "Warrior" was acclaimed by Manga.Tokyo for how violent against the traitors from the groups.

THEM Anime Reviews found Mikasa more appealing than Eren due to her calmer personality and notable skills, which stand out so much in the story that the author finds the series to be feminist and laments how little screentime Mikasa has in favor of the protagonist. Elliot Gray of Japanator found Mikasa and Armin more appealing than Eren. Similarly, Anna Neatrour from Manga Bookshelf found her as a nice contrast to Eren's rude persona. Mikasa's love confession towards Eren was acclaimed by both IGN and Anime News Network due to the portrayal of both actors and how the directing turns a tragic scene into a comforting one.

For the final arc, Den of Geek and IGN enjoyed the confrontation Eren has with Mikasa and Armin for the first time much to their surprise as they have always been kind with each other. IGN viewed his role as more ambiguous when he talks to Mikasa in a flashback about their bonds. The Fandom Post commented despite his aggressive comments, Eren's new characterization might include lies as some generate a major impact on Mikasa's feelings for him. In universe, the song "Under the Tree" is also themed to be "Mikasa's song, in contrast to SiM's previous single "The Rumbling", which focused primarily on Eren. The song's cover art also depicts Mikasa who has taken off a red scarf that Eren gave her when they were children, symbolizing a rift taking place between the two characters in the show.
