= Kaito Ishikawa =

Japanese voice actor

- 石川 界人
- Born: October 13, 1993 (age 33); Bunkyō, Tokyo, Japan
- Occupation: Voice actor
- Years active: 2008–present
- Agent: Stay Luck
- Notable work: JoJo's Bizarre Adventure as Diego Brando; Devil May Cry as Nero; Gargantia on the Verdurous Planet as Ledo; Haikyu!! as Tobio Kageyama; Ensemble Stars!! as Tsumugi Aoba; Tokyo Ghoul as Kuki Urie; Kyokai no RINNE as Rinne Rokudou; One-Punch Man as Genos; Seraph of the End as Shihō Kimizuki; Terror in Resonance as Nine; Ace of Diamond as Shun-chen Yang; Pokémon the Series: Sun & Moon as Kiawe; Tokyo Ravens as Harutora Tsuchimikado; My Hero Academia as Tenya Iida; Rascal Does Not Dream of Bunny Girl Senpai as Sakuta Azusagawa; Black Clover as Langris Vaude; How Heavy Are the Dumbbells You Lift? as Naruzo Machio; The Rising of the Shield Hero as Naofumi Iwatani; A Couple of Cuckoos as Nagi Umino; Dandadan as Jin Enjoji
- Spouse: Maaya Uchida (m. 2025)
- Relatives: Yuma Uchida (brother-in-law); Rina Hidaka (sister-in-law)

Kaito Ishikawa (石川 界人, Ishikawa Kaito; born October 13, 1993) is a Japanese voice actor, affiliated with Stay Luck. He voiced Nero in Devil May Cry, Genos in One-Punch Man, Tenya Iida in My Hero Academia, Tsumugi Aoba in Ensemble Stars!!, Tobio Kageyama in Haikyu!!, and Jin Enjoji in Dandadan.

== Biography ==
Ishikawa performed in a production of Gamba's Great Adventure at a science society when he was in fifth grade. After graduating from high school, he joined a drama club; after making his debut, he was impressed when he heard about the concept of "living a role" from a colleague. After immersing himself in late-night anime like The Familiar of Zero, he pursued roles in Kanon and Genesis of Aquarion. He praised Hiroaki Hirata for voicing Jack Sparrow in Pirates of the Caribbean. Ishikawa entered the Pro Fit Voice Actor Training Center with the money he earned from his part-time job. In 2012, he made his anime debut in Waiting in the Summer, with his first lead role being in April 2013 in the anime series Gargantia on the Verdurous Planet. He won the Best Rookie actor at the 8th Seiyu Awards and the Best Actor in a Supporting Role award at the 14th Seiyu Awards.

On September 30, 2025, his marriage with Maaya Uchida was announced, making him a brother in-law to fellow voice actors Maaya's brother, Yuma, and his wife, Rina Hidaka.

== Filmography ==
=== Anime series ===
Year	Series	Role	Notes	Source
2012	Waiting in the Summer	Student B, Student C		
2012	Phi-Brain - Puzzle of God: The Orpheus Order	Male Student	Ep. 4	
2012	Hyouka	Baseball team member		
2012	Tari Tari	Mailman, Gamba White		
2012	To Love-Ru: Darkness	Male Students		
2012	Say I Love You	Taku		
2012	The Pet Girl of Sakurasou	Guest 2, Young Man 2		
2012	Muv-Luv Alternative: Total Eclipse	Nikolai Rogoshkin		
2013	AKB0048 Next Stage	WOTA		
2013	RDG Red Data Girl	Manatsu Sōda		
2013	Gargantia on the Verdurous Planet	Ledo		
2013	A Certain Scientific Railgun S	Anti-skill, Bad Guy, Black Suit, Judgment (Otoko), Schoolboy, Subordinate, Student, Staff Member		
2013	The "Hentai" Prince and the Stony Cat.	Schoolboy E		
2013	Chronicles of the Going Home Club	Masao Kaneda	Ep. 12	
2013	The Eccentric Family	Daigakusei		
2013	Super Seisyun Brothers	Mao Saitou		
2013	Golden Time	Mitsuo Yanagisawa		
2013	Nagi-Asu: A Lull in the Sea	Tsumugu Kihara		
2013	Ace of Diamond	Shun-chen Yang		
2013	Kuroko's Basketball 2	Kensuke Fukui		
2013	Inazuma Eleven GO Galaxy	Hayato Matatagi, Qasim Badr		
2013	Tokyo Ravens	Harutora Tsuchimikado		
2014—2024	Haikyu!!	Tobio Kageyama		
2014	Nobunaga The Fool	Charlemagne		
2014	The Pilot's Love Song	Ignacio Axis		
2014	Romantica Clock	Aoi Kajiya		
2014	Ace of Diamond	Shun-chen Yang		
2014	Atelier Escha & Logy: Alchemists of the Dusk Sky	Logix Fiscario (anime adaptation)		
2014	Terror in Resonance	Nine/Arata Kokonoe		
2014	Strange+ Season 2	Kanno		
2014	Terra Formars	Marcos Garcia		
2014	Lord Marksman and Vanadis	Tigrevurmud Vorn		
2014	Marvel Disk Wars: The Avengers	Sam Wilson/The Falcon		
2014	Celestial Method	Sota Mizusaka		
2014	Hero Bank	Sekito Sakurada		
2015	World Break: Aria of Curse for a Holy Swordsman	Moroha Haimura		
2015	Assassination Classroom	Ren Sakakibara		
2015	Seraph of the End	Shiho Kimizuki	Also Season 2, which aired in 2015	
2015	High School DxD BorN	Arthur Pendragon		
2015	World Trigger	Kohei Izumi		
2015—2017	Kyōkai no Rinne	Rinne Rokudou	3rd season in 2017	
2015	Gangsta.	Cody Balfour		
2015	Q-Transformers Season 2	Shockwave		
2015	Gate	Takeo Kurata		
2015	Heavy Object	Havia Winchell		
2015—2019	One-Punch Man	Genos		
2015	Concrete Revolutio	Jirō Hitoyoshi		
2015	Yu-Gi-Oh! Arc-V	Shinji Weber		
2015	Noragami Aragoto	Koto Fujisaki		
2016—2025	My Hero Academia	Tenya Iida, Manga Fukidashi		
2016	Prince of Stride: Alternative	Shiki Dozono		
2016	Kuromukuro	Ryoto Akagi		
2016	Re:Zero	Wilhelm van Astrea (young)		
2016	Twin Star Exorcists	Shimon Ikaruga		
2016	Macross Delta	Roid Brehm		
2016	Terra Formars Revenge	Marcos Garcia		
2016	First Love Monster	Atsushi Taga		
2016	Occultic;Nine	Sarai Hashigami		
2016	Bungo Stray Dogs	Taguchi Rokuzou		
2016	Days	Tetsuya Nitobe		
2016	Battery	Keita Higashidani		
2016	Servamp	Shuhei Tsuyuki		
2016	Touken Ranbu: Hanamaru	Kasen Kanesada		
2016—2019	Pocket Monsters: Sun & Moon	Kaki (Kiawe)		
2017	Hand Shakers	Hayate		
2017	Sagrada Reset	Kei Asai		
2017	Chronos Ruler	Kiri Putin		
2017	Tsuredure Children	Takurō Sugawara		
2018	Dame x Prince Anime Caravan	Narek Ishru de Mildonia		
2018	Beatless	Kaidai Ryou		
2018	Pop Team Epic	Pipimi		
2018	Tokyo Ghoul:re	Kuki Urie		
2018	Space Battleship Tiramisu	Subaru Ichinose		
2018	Kakuriyo: Bed and Breakfast for Spirits	Ranmaru		
2018	Touken Ranbu: Hanamaru 2	Kasen Kanesada		
2018	Magical Girl Ore	Saki Uno (male)		
2018	Last Hope	Four		
2018	Happy Sugar Life	Daichi Kitaumekawa	replacing Yuichiro Umehara	
2018	Kyōto Teramachi Sanjō no Holmes	Kiyotaka Yagashira		
2018	Seven Senses of the Re'Union	Takanori Mikado		
2018	Zoids Wild	Drake		
2018	Rascal Does Not Dream of Bunny Girl Senpai	Sakuta Azusagawa		
2018	Karakuri Circus	Hiroo 'Hiro" Nakamachi		
2018	Tsurune	Kaito Onogi		
2018	Overlord	Hekkeran Termite	3rd Season Ep. 6-7	
2018	JoJo's Bizarre Adventure: Golden Wind	Sale		
2018—2021	Black Clover	Langris Vaude		
2019—present	The Rising of the Shield Hero	Naofumi Iwatani		
2019	To the Abandoned Sacred Beasts	Claude Withers		
2019	How Heavy Are the Dumbbells You Lift?	Naruzō Machio		
2019	Ensemble Stars!	Tsumugi Aoba		
2019	Kochoki: Wakaki Nobunaga	Oda Nobuyuki		
2019	Psycho-Pass 3	Torri S. Aschenbach		
2020	number24	Kazutaka Hongō		
2020	Isekai Quartet 2	Naofumi Iwatani		
2020	BNA: Brand New Animal	Alan Sylvasta		
2020	Wave, Listen to Me!	Ryūsuke Kōmoto		
2020	Plunderer	Tokikaze Sakai		
2020	Get Up! Get Live!	Toranosuke Ōno		
2020	King's Raid: Successors of the Will	Kasel		
2020	Sleepy Princess in the Demon Castle	Demon Cleric		
2020	The Gymnastics Samurai	Atsushi Dōjima		
2020–present	Rent-A-Girlfriend	Umi Nakano		
2021	2.43: Seiin High School Boys Volleyball Team	Mimura Subaru		
2021	So I'm a Spider, So What?	Hugo		
2021	Kemono Jihen	Yui		
2021	Let's Make a Mug Too	Tokishirō Toyokawa		
2021	Dragon Goes House-Hunting	Dearia		
2021	Backflip!!	Ryōya Misato		
2021	Platinum End	Kanade Uryu		
2021—2022	The Case Study of Vanitas	Noé Archiviste		
2022	Tokyo 24th Ward	Koki Suido		
2022	Life with an Ordinary Guy Who Reincarnated into a Total Fantasy Knockout	Schwartz		
2022	Salaryman's Club	Sōta Saeki		
2022	A Couple of Cuckoos	Nagi Umino		
2022	The Yakuza's Guide to Babysitting	Kei Sugihara		
2022	To Your Eternity	Hairo Rich	2nd Season	
2023—2024	Mashle	Lance Crown		
2023	Endo and Kobayashi Live! The Latest on Tsundere Villainess Lieselotte	Aoto Endō		
2023	Tomo-chan Is a Girl!	Junichiro Kubota		
2023	Demon Slayer: Kimetsu no Yaiba – Swordsmith Village Arc	Karaku		
2023	My Happy Marriage	Kiyoka Kudo		
2023	My Unique Skill Makes Me OP Even at Level 1	Ryota Sato		
2023	Saint Cecilia and Pastor Lawrence	Lawrence		
2023	A Playthrough of a Certain Dude's VRMMO Life	Earth		
2023	Beyblade X	Khrome Ryugu		
2023	The Kingdoms of Ruin	Adonis		
2023	MF Ghost	Yōsuke Ōtani		
2024	Viral Hit	Reo Shinjo		
2024	Alya Sometimes Hides Her Feelings in Russian	Touya Kenzaki		
2024	Tasūketsu	Teru Kirishima		
2024	Quality Assurance in Another World	Haga		
2024	I'll Become a Villainess Who Goes Down in History	Duke Seeker		
2024	Negative Positive Angler	Takaaki Tsutsujimori		
2024	Dandadan	Jin Enjoji		
2024	Mecha-Ude	Sinis, Dex		
2024	Haigakura	Tenkō		
2024	Nina the Starry Bride	Bidoh		
2024	Shangri-La Frontier 2nd Season	Mordo		
2025	From Bureaucrat to Villainess: Dad's Been Reincarnated!	Virgile Vierge		
2025	From Old Country Bumpkin to Master Swordsman	Henbritz Drought		
2025	The Unaware Atelier Master	Kans		
2025	Witch Watch	Keigo Magami		
2025	Onmyo Kaiten Re:Birth Verse	Atsunaga		
2026	The Darwin Incident	Gare		
2026	I Want to End This Love Game	Yukiya Asagi		
2026	Petals of Reincarnation	I. Newton		
2026	Pardon the Intrusion, I'm Home!	Akito Satsuki		
2026	The Duke's Son Claims He Won't Love Me yet Showers Me with Adoration	Yalmo Parnila		

=== Original video animation ===
Year	OVA	Role	Source
2012	Nazotoki-hime wa Meitantei	Rikka Fujisaki	
2014	Fantasista Stella	Ryuji Morikawa	
2014	Haikyu!! VS Failing Grades	Tobio Kageyama	
2018	Attack on Titan: Lost Girls 'Wall Sina, Goodbye' Part. B	Lou	

=== Original net animation ===
Year	Original Net Animation	Role	Source
2014	Bonjour Sweet Love Patisserie	Ryō Kōduki	
2015	Hetalia: World Twinkle	Molossia	
2018	B: The Beginning	Minatsuki	
2019	7 Seeds	Ryusei Ogiwara	
2020	Beyblade Burst Superking	Lean Walhalla	
2021	Vlad Love	Okada	
2022	Kotaro Lives Alone	Ryōta	
2023	Record of Ragnarok	Qin Shi Huang	
2026	Yu-Gi-Oh! Card Game The Chronicles	Beast Tamer	
2026	Steel Ball Run: JoJo's Bizarre Adventure	Diego Brando	

=== Anime films ===
- Code Geass: Akito the Exiled (2013), Jan Manes
- Saint Seiya: Legend of Sanctuary (2014), Pegasus Seiya
- Your Name (2016), Shinta Takagi
- Genocidal Organ (2017), Realand
- Black Butler: Book of the Atlantic (2017), Ryan Stoker
- My Hero Academia: Two Heroes (2018), Tenya Iida
- Rascal Does Not Dream of a Dreaming Girl (2019), Sakuta Azusagawa
- My Hero Academia: Heroes Rising (2019), Tenya Iida
- My Hero Academia: World Heroes' Mission (2021), Tenya Iida
- Backflip!! (2022), Ryōya Misato
- Tsurune: The Movie – The First Shot (2022), Kaito Onogi
- Rascal Does Not Dream of a Sister Venturing Out (2023), Sakuta Azusagawa
- Rascal Does Not Dream of a Knapsack Kid (2023), Sakuta Azusagawa
- Haikyu!! The Dumpster Battle (2024), Tobio Kageyama
- My Hero Academia: You're Next (2024), Tenya Iida
- Rascal Does Not Dream of a Dear Friend (2026), Sakuta Azusagawa

=== Video games ===
- Bravely Default (2012), Owen
- E.X. Troopers (2012), Ein
- Atelier Escha & Logy: Alchemists of the Dusk Sky (2013), Logix "Logy" Fiscario
- Azure Striker Gunvolt (2014), Gunvolt
- Super Robot Wars Original Generation Coffin of the End (2014), Sakito Asagi
- Hero Bank 2 (2014), Sekito Sakurada
- Senjou no Waltz (2014), Pash
- Devil May Cry 4: Special Edition (2015), Nero
- Psychedelica of the Black Butterfly (2015), Hikage
- Zettai Kaikyuu Gakuen: Eden with Roses and Phantasm (2015), Haru Igarashi
- Possession Magenta (2015), Taiga Aoba
- Dynamic Chord feat. Kyohso (2015), Kuroya Yuu
- Touken Ranbu (2015), Kasen Kanesada
- Star Ocean 5: Integrity and Faithlessness (2016), Fidel Camuze
- Gundam Breaker 3 (2016), Mitsuki
- Ensemble Stars! (2016), Tsumugi Aoba
- Ikemen Royal Palace: Cinderella in Midnight (2016), Alyn Crawford
- Onmyōji (2016), Kubinashi
- Bungou to Alchemist (2016), Atsushi Nakajima
- Kingdom Hearts HD 2.8 Final Chapter Prologue (2017), Gula
- OVERHIT (2018), Asshiko
- My Hero: One's Justice (2018), Tenya Iida
- Shinen Resist (2018), Gerard
- Code Vein (2019), Louis Amamiya
- Devil May Cry 5 (2019), Nero
- Fire Emblem: Three Houses (2019), Dimitri Alexandre Blaiddyd
- Granblue Fantasy, Noa
- Band Yarouze, (2016) Kazuma Nanase
- On Air!, (2018) Rikka Yarai
- Sangokushi Heroes (2019), Zhou Yu
- Grand Summoners (2019), Genos, Berwick, Swordsman Berwick, Naofumi Iwatani
- Teppen (2019), Nero
- BlackStar - Theatre Starless (2019), Gui
- Arknights (2019), Thorns
- Ys IX: Monstrum Nox (2019), Credo Aiblinger, Hawk
- 13 Sentinels: Aegis Rim (2019), Keitaro Miura
- The Seven Deadly Sins: Grand Cross (2019), Freyr
- Fate/Grand Order (2020), Daybit Sem Void, Saitō Hajime
- Piofiore no Banshou (2020) Dante Falzone
- NEKOPARA - Catboy's Paradise (2021), Laurier
- Tears of Themis (2021), Marius von Hagen
- Shin Megami Tensei V (2021), Yuzuru Atsuta
- Grand Chase Dimensional Chaser (2021), Harpe Noir
- Arena of Valor (2021), Genos [OPM Skin]
- Cookie Run: Kingdom (2021), Milk Cookie
- Bustafellows (2021), Adam Krylov
- Soul Hackers 2 (2022), Arrow
- Project Sekai: Colorful Stage! feat. Hatsune Miku (2022), Asahi Genbu
- Azure Striker Gunvolt 3 (2022), Gunvolt
- Fire Emblem Warriors: Three Hopes (2022), Dimitri Alexandre Blaiddyd
- Punishing: Gray Raven (2022), Noan
- Disgaea 7 (2023), Fuji
- Rear Sekai (2023), Male Protagonist

=== Drama CDs ===
- Shinsengumi Hokushouden Vol. 01 (????), Hajime Saito
- Colorful5 no Nichijou (????), Kanade Hinohara
- Colorful5 no Bunkasai (????), Kanade Hinohara
- Colorful5 no Kessei Hiwa (????), Kanade Hinohara
- Honeymoon (Drama CD) Vol. 17 (????), Keigo Makabe
- DYNAMIC CHORD vocal CD Series Vol. 03 (????), Yuu Kuroya
- Gargantia on the Verdurous Planet (????), Ledo
- Nagi no Asukara Drama CD 01 (????), Tsumugu Kihara
- Nagi no Asukara Drama CD 03 (????), Tsumugu Kihara
- Nareru! SE, Kohei Sakurazaka
- Like a Butterfly, Atohira

== Dubbing ==
=== Live-action ===
- Alien: Romulus, Tyler (Archie Renaux)
- Backrooms, Naren Warne (Avan Jogia)
- Chip 'n Dale: Rescue Rangers, Chip (John Mulaney)
- A Dog's Journey, Trent (Henry Lau)
- Eternals, Eros / Starfox (Harry Styles)
- The Fast and the Furious: Tokyo Drift (2025 The Cinema edition), Takashi (Brian Tee)
- Gran Turismo, Nicholas Capa (Josha Stradowski)
- The Guest, Luke Peterson (Brendan Meyer)
- Home Alone 3 (2019 NTV edition), Stan Pruitt (Seth Smith)
- Moonfall, Sonny Harper (Charlie Plummer)
- Pacific Rim: Uprising, Ilya (Levi Meaden)
- Pokémon Detective Pikachu, DJ (Diplo)
- Robot Overlords, Sean Flynn (Callan McAuliffe)
- St. Elmo's Fire (2022 The Cinema edition), Alec Newbury (Judd Nelson)
- Tron: Ares, Julian Dillinger (Evan Peters)
- Valerian and the City of a Thousand Planets, Sergeant Neza (Kris Wu)

=== Animation ===
- All Saints Street, Lynn
- KPop Demon Hunters, Jinu
