= The Villainess Who Came to Marry Into the Frontier Noble's Household Is an Exceptionally Capable Wife, Isn't She? =

Japanese light novel series

- First light novel volume cover

辺境モブ貴族のウチに嫁いできた悪役令嬢が、めちゃくちゃできる良い嫁なんだが？ (Henkyō Mobu Kizoku no Uchi ni Totsuide Kita Akuyaku Reijō ga, Mechakucha Dekira Ii Yome nandaga?)
- Genre: Fantasy; Romantic comedy
- Novel series
- Written by: tera
- Published by: Kakuyomu
- Original run: March 22, 2023 – present
- Light novel
- Written by: tera
- Illustrated by: Tetta (vols. 1–3); Pengū (vol. 4–)
- Published by: Fujimi Shobo
- Imprint: Dragon Novels
- Original run: March 5, 2024 – present
- Volumes: 4
- Manga
- Written by: tera
- Illustrated by: Hayate Asakura
- Published by: Fujimi Shobo
- English publisher: NA: One Peace Books
- Imprint: Dragon Comics Age
- Magazine: DraDra Flat
- Original run: October 10, 2024 – present
- Volumes: 3

The Villainess Who Came to Marry Into the Frontier Noble's Household Is an Exceptionally Capable Wife, Isn't She? (辺境モブ貴族のウチに嫁いできた悪役令嬢が、めちゃくちゃできる良い嫁なんだが？, Henkyō Mobu Kizoku no Uchi ni Totsuide Kita Akuyaku Reijō ga, Mechakucha Dekira Ii Yome nandaga?) is a Japanese light novel series written by tera and illustrated by Tetta. It initially began serialization as a web novel on Kadokawa Corporation's Kakuyomu website in March 2023. It later began publication under Fujimi Shobo's Dragon Novels imprint in March 2024. A manga adaptation illustrated by Hayate Asakura began serialization on Kadokawa's KadoComi and Nico Nico Seiga websites under its DraDra Flat imprint in October 2024.

== Synopsis ==
The protagonist is reborn into the world of an otome game he played in his previous life as a man named Ragna. Ragna is an heir to a frontier noble family and seeks a peaceful life, but finds it difficult managing his land in the frontier environment. One day, Ragna receives a proposal for marriage from a woman named Alicia. Ragna remembers that Alicia was the villainess of the game he played; and later finds out that her status as the villainess is not as a result of her personality, and that she is often under attack from malicious forces. So Ragna seeks to protect her at all cost.

== Characters ==
Ragna (ラグナ, Raguna)
Voiced by: Nobunaga Shimazaki (commercial)
Alicia (アリシア, Arishia)
Voiced by: Yui Ishikawa (commercial)

== Media ==
=== Light novel ===
Written by tera, The Villainess Who Came to Marry Into the Frontier Noble's Household Is an Exceptionally Capable Wife, Isn't She? began serialization as a web novel on Kadokawa Corporation's Kakuyomu website on March 22, 2023. It later began publication as a light novel with illustrations by Tetta under Fujimi Shobo's Dragon Novels imprint on March 5, 2024. Four volumes have been released as of April 3, 2026.

No.	Release date	ISBN
1	March 5, 2024	978-4-04-075325-6
2	June 5, 2024	978-4-04-075508-3
3	February 5, 2025	978-4-04-075674-5
4	April 3, 2026	978-4-04-076338-5

=== Manga ===
A manga adaptation illustrated by Hayate Asakura began serialization on Kadokawa's KadoComi and Nico Nico Seiga websites under its DraDra Flat imprint on October 10, 2024. The manga's chapters have been compiled into three tankōbon volumes as of May 2026.

In December 2025, One Peace Books announced that it had licensed the manga adaptation for English publication.

No.	Original release date	Original ISBN	North American release date	North American ISBN
1	March 7, 2025	978-4-04-075840-4	September 15, 2026	978-1-64-273549-9
2	September 9, 2025	978-4-04-076082-7	—	—
3	May 8, 2026	978-4-04-076344-6	—	—

=== Other ===
In commemoration of the release of third volume of the manga adaptation, a 30 second commercial featuring voice acting from Nobunaga Shimazaki and Yui Ishikawa was uploaded to the Kadokawa YouTube channel on May 8, 2026.

== Reception ==
The manga adaptation won the "Best Partner Award" in the Isekai Division of the 2025 Renta Manga Awards.
