= Yui Ishikawa =

Japanese voice actress

- 石川 由依
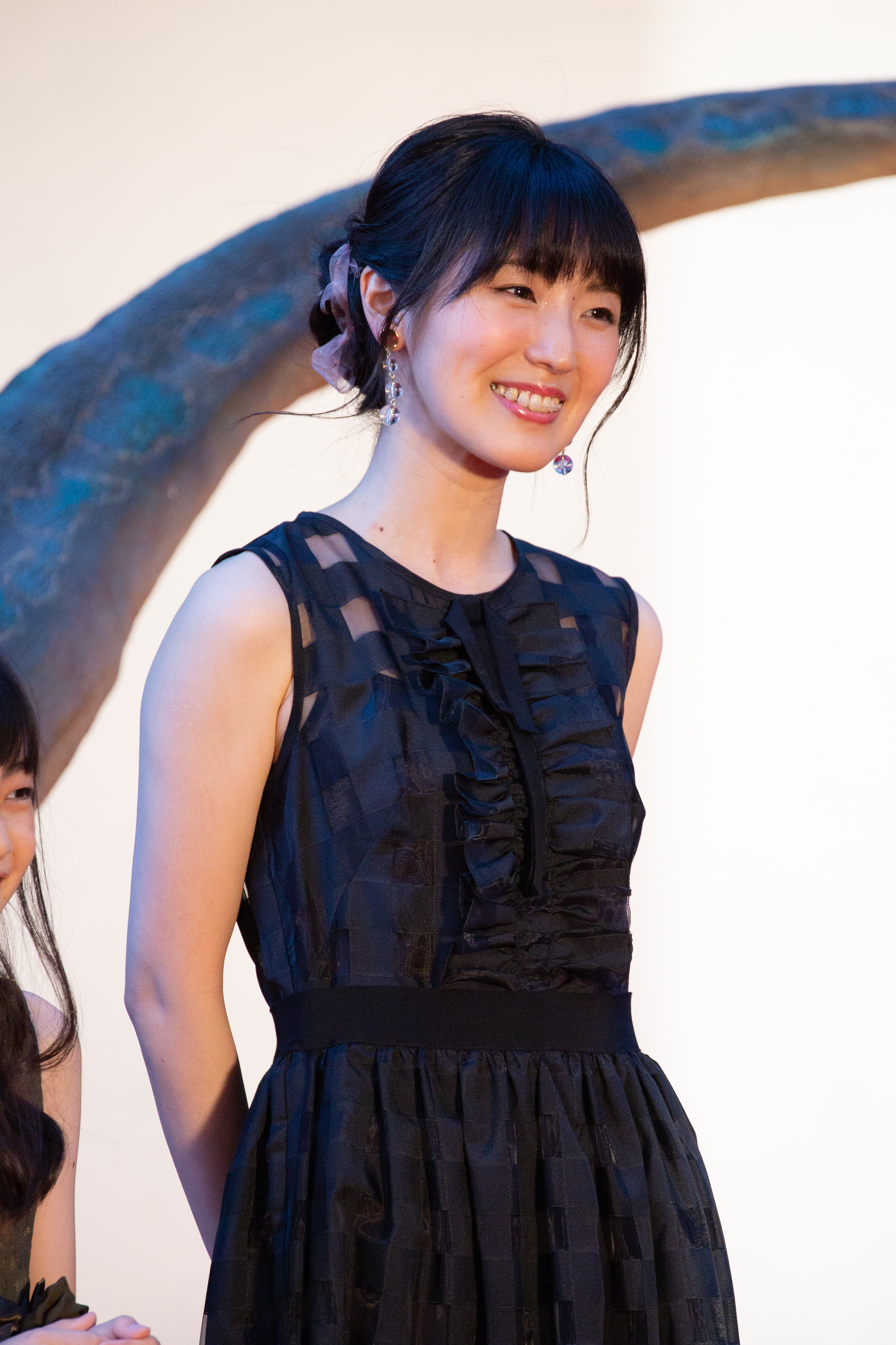
- Yui Ishikawa at the Japan premiere of Jurassic World: Fallen Kingdom in 2018
- Born: May 30, 1989 (age 37); Hyōgo Prefecture, Japan
- Occupations: Actress; voice actress
- Years active: 2002–present
- Agent: amitty
- Spouse: Unknown (married since 2021)
- Children: 1

Yui Ishikawa (石川 由依, Ishikawa Yui; born May 30, 1989) is a Japanese actress. She was previously represented by Sunaoka Office but now works for amitty. (Note: mitt management is renamed "amitty" from August 1, 2026.) Prior to becoming a voice actress, she worked mainly on stage. Her specialities are classical ballet, jazz dance, and tap dance. Before she started as a voice actress, she was a stage actress and has been voicing radio dramas since 2007.

Her biggest roles were as starring characters Mikasa Ackerman in Attack on Titan and Violet Evergarden in Violet Evergarden. She also voices China Kousaka in Gundam Build Fighters, Sayuri Haruno in Bonjour Sweet Love Patisserie, Hinaki Shinjo in Aikatsu!, and YoRHa No.2 Type B (2B) in Nier: Automata. At the 8th Seiyu Awards in 2014, she won an award for Best Supporting Actress. She also won the award for Best Actress in a Leading Role at the 15th Annual Seiyū Awards in 2021 for her role in Violet Evergarden.

She has attended anime conventions around the world, including Sakura-Con in Seattle, Otakuthon in Montreal, Japan Expo in Paris, and Madman Anime Festival in Brisbane.

== Biography ==
Ishikawa was 6 years old when she joined the theatre company, Himawari in Osaka while commuting to school when she was a student. She appears in performances within the theatre company every year, and since coming to Tokyo, she has appeared in musical class performances and main performances.

When she was in elementary school, Ishikawa entered the performance live, "Dream Quest" sponsored by the theatre company as a duo, and performed songs and dances. From junior high school, Ishikawa has starred in many of the theatre company's masterpiece musical series. In September 2005, when she was in the first year of high school, she transferred to the Sunaoka office of the Himawari Theatre Group.

In 2007, she made her anime debut as Dianeira in the TV anime Heroic Age.

In 2014, she won the Best Actress in supporting roles at the 8th Seiyu Awards. On March 30, she held her first solo talk at Hotel New Otani Osaka in the same year. Ishikawa's official website was opened on November 27.

In November 2016, the activity as "Trefle" was finished. Part of the live final and the feedback for each person was delivered on November 18, 2016, on Nico Nico Live Broadcasting "Second Shot Night" and "Trefle-TV" (final episode).

In 2019, there was a dedicated official site "Yui Ishikawa official site", but the site was closed by the end of 2018. In the future, it will be written and announced on the TOP page of the office, the profile column, or the blog.

On April 30, 2019, she announced her departure from the Sunaoka office on her blog. Ishikawa belonged to the Himawari Theatre Group for 23 and a half years.

On May 10, 2019, it was announced that she had joined "mitt management" at the same time as opening her official Twitter.

On November 19, 2019, information on Ishikawa's solo project "UTA-KATA" was released. A music reading drama project planned by Shigeru Saito of Heart Company Co., Ltd., "Yui Ishikawa UTA-KATA Vol.1 ~ Dawn's Ginyu Poet ~" was held in 3 cities and 6 performances from January 11, 2020. Along with the piano performance by Masumi Itō, the story was read aloud by Kana Akatsuki and the original song for this work was performed.

On May 5, 2020, the mitt management submitted a damage report to the police because of the continuous threatening posts to "harm" Ishikawa herself, her family, and the office. A man who had posted an online threat on June 1, 2020, was arrested.

On March 6, 2021, she won the Best Actress in a Leading Role at the 15th Seiyu Awards.

In 2022, Ishikawa's second solo project "UTA-KATA" was released. "Yui Ishikawa UTA-KATA Vol.2 ~The Girl Who Sells Songs~" was held in 3 cities and 8 performances from September 10, 2022.

== Personal life ==
On May 30, 2021, she announced her marriage on her 32nd birthday.

On May 11, 2025, Ishikawa announced that she just gave birth to her first child.

== Filmography ==
=== Anime ===
List of voice performances in anime
| Year | Title | Role | Notes | Source |
|---|---|---|---|---|
| 2005 | Oden-kun ja:おでんくん | Squid イカちゃん | | |
| 2007 | Heroic Age | Dhianeila | | |
| 2008 | The Tower of Druaga: The Aegis of Uruk | Princess | | |
| 2009 | Darker than Black: Gemini of the Meteor | Tanya Akurou | | |
| 2013–2023 | Attack on Titan | Mikasa Ackerman | Also anime compilation films, season 4 in 2020 | |
| 2013 | Pokémon Origins | Reina | | |
| 2013 | Gundam Build Fighters | China Kousaka | Also Try in 2014 | |
| 2013 | Lupin III: Princess of the Breeze – Hidden City in the Sky | Yutika | | |
| 2014 | Mushishi | Daughter | | |
| 2014 | Yu-Gi-Oh! Arc-V | Layra Akaba | | |
| 2014–2016 | Aikatsu! | Hinaki Shinjō | Season 3, 4 | |
| 2014 | Bonjour Sweet Love Patisserie | Sayuri Haruno | | |
| 2015 | Fafner in the Azure: Exodus | Mimika Mikagami | Also Late in 2015 | |
| 2015 | Seraph of the End | Shigure Yukimi | | |
| 2015 | Diabolik Lovers More, Blood | Kou (child) | | |
| 2015 | Attack on Titan: Junior High | Mikasa Ackerman | | |
| 2016 | Ushio and Tora | Kaori | Season 2 | |
| 2016 | Qualidea Code | Canaria Utara | | |
| 2016 | Girlish Number | Koto Katakura | | |
| 2017 | Eromanga Sensei | Tomoe Takasago | | |
| 2017 | Aikatsu Stars! | Hinaki Shinjō | Episode 69 | |
| 2018 | Fate/Extra Last Encore | Hakuno Kishinami (Female) | | |
| 2018 | Violet Evergarden | Violet Evergarden | First episode screening at Anime Expo in July 2017 | |
| 2018 | Devils' Line | Tsukasa Taira | | |
| 2018 | Cells at Work! | Rookie Red Blood Cell | | |
| 2019 | Kemono Friends 2 | Kyururu | | |
| 2019 | Azur Lane | Enterprise | | |
| 2019–2020 | Aikatsu on Parade! | Hinaki Shinjō | | |
| 2019 | Assassins Pride | Elise Angel | | |
| 2020 | Smile Down the Runway | Honoka Tsumura | | |
| 2020 | Iwa-Kakeru! -Sport Climbing Girls- | Jun Uehara | | |
| 2020 | The Day I Became a God | Kyōko Izanami | | |
| 2020 | Pokémon: Twilight Wings | Marnie/Klara | | |
| 2021 | Dragon Quest: The Adventure of Dai | Amy | | |
| 2021 | Ex-Arm | Alisa Himegami | | |
| 2021–2022 | Tropical-Rouge! Pretty Cure | Minori Ichinose/Cure Papaya | | |
| 2021 | Farewell, My Dear Cramer | Haruna Itō | | |
| 2021–2023 | The Saint's Magic Power Is Omnipotent | Sei Takanashi | Also season 2 | |
| 2021 | Battle Athletes Victory ReSTART! | Eva Garenstein | | |
| 2021 | Aikatsu Planet! | Haute Couture Mirror | | |
| 2021 | How a Realist Hero Rebuilt the Kingdom | Jeanne Euphoria | | |
| 2021 | That Time I Got Reincarnated as a Slime | Kagali | Season 2 | |
| 2021 | The Aquatope on White Sand | Chiyu Haebara | | |
| 2021 | Amaim Warrior at the Borderline | I-LeS Kai | | |
| 2022 | Police in a Pod | Seiko Fuji | | |
| 2022 | Platinum End | Manami Yumiki | | |
| 2022 | Akebi's Sailor Uniform | Riri Minakami | | |
| 2022 | Black Rock Shooter: Dawn Fall | Empress (Black Rock Shooter) | | |
| 2022 | Arknights: Prelude to Dawn | Liskarm | | |
| 2023 | The Ice Guy and His Cool Female Colleague | Fuyutsuki-san | | |
| 2023 | Nier: Automata Ver1.1a | YoRHa No. 2 Type B (2B) | | |
| 2023 | Alice Gear Aegis Expansion | Fumika Momoshina | | |
| 2023 | The Masterful Cat Is Depressed Again Today | Saku Fukuzawa | | |
| 2023 | The Demon Sword Master of Excalibur Academy | Riselia | | |
| 2023 | Undead Unluck | Mui | | |
| 2023 | The Apothecary Diaries | Lihua | | |
| 2024 | Doctor Elise | Elise | | |
| 2024 | Viral Hit | Kaho Asamiya | | |
| 2024 | Tonbo! | Hinoki Otoha | Season 2 | |
| 2025 | Aquarion: Myth of Emotions | Sedona | | |
| 2025 | Guilty Gear Strive: Dual Rulers | Unika | | |
| 2025 | Mobile Suit Gundam GQuuuuuuX | Nyaan | | |
| 2025 | The Too-Perfect Saint: Tossed Aside by My Fiancé and Sold to Another Kingdom | Philia | | |
| 2025 | City the Animation | Wako Izumi | | |
| 2025 | Scooped Up by an S-Rank Adventurer! | Rina | | |
| 2025 | Dusk Beyond the End of the World | Yugure | | |
| 2025 | This Monster Wants to Eat Me | Shiori Oumi | | |
| 2026 | Noble Reincarnation: Born Blessed, So I'll Obtain Ultimate Power | Evelyn | | |
| 2026 | High School! Kimengumi | Yumi Monozukishi | | |
| 2026 | A Misanthrope Teaches a Class for Demi-Humans | Aoi Wakaba | | |
| 2026 | Eren the Southpaw | Sayuri Katō | | |
| 2026 | Witch Hat Atelier | Luluci | | |
| 2026 | The Duke's Son Claims He Won't Love Me yet Showers Me with Adoration | Elsa Yukarainen | | |
| 2026 | The World's Strongest Rearguard | Elitia | | |
| 2026 | I Became a Legend After My 10 Year-Long Last Stand | Celliss Morton | | |
| 2026 | I Want to Love You Till Your Dying Day | Ali Maud | | |
| 2026 | Though I Am an Inept Villainess | Gen Kasui | | |
| 2027 | Otherworldly Munchkin: Let's Speedrun the Dungeon with Only 1 HP! | Lumilia Sherwood | | |

=== Original video animation ===
List of voice performances in OVA
| Year | Title | Role | Notes | Source |
|---|---|---|---|---|
| 2013 | Attack on Titan: Ilse's Notebook | Mikasa Ackerman | | |
| 2021 | Alice Gear Aegis: Heart Pounding! Actress Packed Mermaid Grand Prix! | Fumika Momoshina | | |

=== Original net animation ===
List of voice performances in ONA
| Year | Title | Role | Notes | Source |
|---|---|---|---|---|
| 2023 | Onmyōji | Tsuyuko | | |
| 2024 | A Herbivorous Dragon of 5,000 Years Gets Unfairly Villainized Season 2 | Vanessa | | |

=== Film ===
List of voice performances in film
| Year | Title | Role | Notes | Source |
|---|---|---|---|---|
| 2012 | Nerawareta Gakuen | Haruka Soga | | |
| 2015 | Aikatsu! Music Awards – The Show Where Everyone Gets an Award! | Hinaki Shinjō | | |
| 2016 | Aikatsu! The Targeted Magical Aikatsu Card | Hinaki Shinjō | | |
| 2016 | A Silent Voice | Miyoko Sahara | | |
| 2019 | Violet Evergarden: Eternity and the Auto Memory Doll | Violet Evergarden | | |
| 2019 | Kimi dake ni Motetainda | Sakiko "Horiko" Horinomiya | | |
| 2020 | Violet Evergarden: The Movie | Violet Evergarden | | |
| 2021 | Mobile Suit Gundam: Hathaway's Flash | Emerelda Zubin | | |
| 2022 | Tongari Head Gonta: The Story of a Fukushima Disaster Dog Who Lived Two Names | Yuki Yoshino | | |
| 2024 | Zegapain STA | Basufōta | | |
| 2026 | Mobile Suit Gundam: Hathaway – The Sorcery of Nymph Circe | Emerelda Zubin | | |

=== Video games ===
List of voice performances in video games
| Year | Title | Role | Notes | Source |
|---|---|---|---|---|
| 2014 | Granblue Fantasy | Rosamia | | |
| 2014 | Sword Art Online: Hollow Fragment | Philia | | |
| 2015 | Sword Art Online: Lost Song | Philia | PS3, other | |
| 2015 | Seraph of the End | Shigure Yukimi | | |
| 2016 | Attack on Titan | Mikasa Ackerman | PS3, other | |
| 2016 | Girls' Frontline | Gager, Fedorov | iOS, Android | |
| 2016 | Recolove ja:レコラヴ | Rinze Himeragi 妃月凜世 | Blue Ocean and Gold Beach | |
| 2016 | Sword Art Online: Hollow Realization | Philia | | |
| 2017 | Nier: Automata | YoRHa No.2 Type B (2B) | | |
| 2017 | Azur Lane | USS Enterprise (CV-6), Little Enterprise | | |
| 2017 | SINoALICE | YoRHa No.2 Type B (2B) | AS part of a collab event between SINoALICE and Nier: Automata | |
| 2018 | Alice Gear Aegis | Fumika Momoshina | | |
| 2018 | Fate/Extella Link | Hakuno Kishinami (Female) | | |
| 2018 | Another Eden | Isuka | | |
| 2018 | Dragalia Lost | Regina | | |
| 2018 | Sdorica | Tindoiimu | | |
| 2018 | Soulcalibur VI | YoRHa No.2 Type B (2B) | Guest character | |
| 2019 | Punishing: Gray Raven | Lucia, Alpha, YoRHa No.2 Type B (2B) | | |
| 2019 | Gunvolt Chronicles: Luminous Avenger iX | Blade | | |
| 2019 | Bright Memory | Shelia | Japanese dub | |
| 2019 | Sakura Wars | Kaoru Rindo | | |
| 2020 | Arknights | Liskarm, Nightingale | | |
| 2020 | Samurai Shodown | Mina Majikina | DLC character | |
| 2020 | Digimon ReArise | Mon | Season 2 | |
| 2020 | Tales of Crestoria | Misella | Main character | |
| 2020 | ALTDEUS: Beyond Chronos | Anima | | |
| 2021– | Fate/Grand Order | Morgan, Aesc the Savior, Hakuno Kishinami | | |
| 2021 | Alchemy Stars | Ms. Blanc, Sharona, Ms. Blanc: Pura Cordis | | |
| 2021 | Kanda Alice mo Suiri Suru. | Houju Sawaragi | | |
| 2021 | The Legend of Heroes: Trails Through Daybreak | Risette Twinings | | |
| 2021 | Identity V | Geisha [Michiko] | Narrator; Japanese dub | |
| 2022 | Octopath Traveler: Champions of the Continent | YoRHa No.2 Type B (2B) | iOS, Android | |
| 2022 | Naraka: Bladepoint | Justina Gu | PC, Xbox, PS4, PS5 | |
| 2022 | Guardian Tales | Little Android AA72, Android Mk.99, Autonomous Android Mk.2 | | |
| 2022 | Omega Strikers | Era | Japanese Voice | |
| 2022 | Tower of Fantasy | Meryl | iOS, Android, PC, PS4, PS5 | |
| 2022 | Monster Hunter Rise Sunbreak | Fiorayne | Expansion Pack | |
| 2022 | Fairy Fencer F: Refrain Chord | Songstress Fleur | PS4, PS5, Switch | |
| 2022 | The Legend of Heroes: Trails Through Daybreak II | Risette Twinings | PS4, PS5 | |
| 2022– | Goddess of Victory: Nikke | Rapi, YoRHa No.2 Type B (2B) | Japanese dub | |
| 2023– | Blue Archive | Toki Asuma | | |
| 2023 | Master Detective Archives: Rain Code | Halara Nightmare | | |
| 2023 | Synduality | Ada | PS5, Xbox Series X/S, PC | |
| 2023– | Honkai: Star Rail | Stelle/Trailblazer | iOS, Android, PC, PS4, PS5 | |
| 2023– | Genshin Impact | Clorinde | iOS, Android, PC, PS4, PS5 | |
| 2023 | Wizardry Variants Daphne | Pulgritte | | |
| 2023 | Path To Nowhere | Rahu | iOS, Android | |
| 2023 | Naruto x Boruto: Ultimate Ninja Storm Connections | Nanashi Uchiha | | |
| 2024 | Granblue Fantasy Versus: Rising | YoRHa No.2 Type B (2B) | | |
| 2024– | Wuthering Waves | Yangyang, Yangyang:Xuanling | iOS, Android, PC, PS5, macOS | |
| 2024 | Rise of the Rōnin | Female Protagonist/Blade Twin | PC, PS5 | |
| 2024 | The Seven Deadly Sins: Grand Cross | Salos | iOS, Android | |
| 2024 | Metaphor: ReFantazio | Maria | PC, PS4, PS5, Xbox Series X | |
| 2024 | Reverse Collapse: Code Name Bakery | Lige, Lusica, Shrike β & Mitotic Specimen | PC | |
| 2024 | Strinova | Fragrans | PC, Mobile | |
| 2025 | Etheria: Restart | Lian | iOS, Android, PC | |
| 2025 | Duet Night Abyss | Berenica | iOS, Android, PC | |
| 2025 | Guilty Gear Strive | Unika | | |
| 2026 | Dark Auction | Lorraine Klopp | | |
| 2026 | Beast of Reincarnation | Emma | | |

=== Radio and audio ===
List of voice performances in radio and audio recordings
| Year | Title | Role | Notes | Source |
|---|---|---|---|---|
| 2002 | Shocking しゃばけ | Singer 鳴家 | Radio | |
| 2004 | Shabba 2 しゃばけ2 | Singer 鳴家 | Radio | |
| 2006 | Wind mystery papers 風神秘抄 | Kaisei 糸世 | Radio | |
| 2009 | Aquarian Age 10th Anniversary Drama CD 2 – If my family is prosperous, let's get out of my skin. ~ アクエリアンエイジ10thアニバーサリードラマCD2 ～我が種族の繁栄の為なら、ひと肌脱ごう。～ | Rosso ロッソ | CD（A） | |
| 2011 | Snow princess Tono Osashima labyrinth 雪姫 遠野おしらさま迷宮 | Hoshi Miyano 宮乃ホシ | Radio | |
| 2011 | Desert Diva 砂漠の歌姫 | Yun ユン | Radio | |
| 2012 | Echo Island is a devil 月蝕島の魔物 | Maple Cornway メイプル・コーンウェイ | Radio | |
| 2013 | Skull castle bride 髑髏城の花嫁 | Maple メイプル | Radio | |
| 2013 | Christmas carol クリスマス・キャロル | Martha マーサ | Radio | |
| 2014 | Together with Symphonic Poetry Jean – only one migratory bird ~ 交響詩 ジーンとともに～たった一羽の渡り鳥～ | Chick ヒナ | Radio | |
| 2013 | Attack on Titan | Mikasa Ackerman | Drama CD | |

=== Dubbing roles ===
List of dubbing performances
| Title | Role | Voice dub for | Source |
|---|---|---|---|
| Jurassic World: Fallen Kingdom | Zia Rodriguez | Daniella Pineda | |
| Jurassic World Dominion | Zia Rodriguez | Daniella Pineda | |
| Mortal Engines | Hester Shaw | Hera Hilmar | |

== Awards and prizes ==
| Year | Award | Result |
|---|---|---|
| 2014 | 8th Seiyu Awards for Best Supporting Actress | Won |
| 2021 | 15th Seiyu Awards for Best Actress | Won |
