= The Duke's Son Claims He Won't Love Me yet Showers Me with Adoration =

Japanese manga series

- First tankōbon volume cover, featuring Elsa Jukarainen (left) and Julius Roas (right)

「きみを愛する気はない」と言った次期公爵様がなぜか溺愛してきます (Kimi o Aisuru Ki wa Nai to Itta Jiki Kōshaku-sama ga Nazeka Dekiai Shitekimasu)
- Genre: Fantasy, romance
- Manga
- Written by: Kei Misawa
- Illustrated by: Natsu Mizuno
- Published by: Flex Comix
- English publisher: NA: MangaPlaza
- Imprint: Polaris Comics
- Magazine: Comic Arc; Comic Polaris
- Original run: February 24, 2021 – present
- Volumes: 5
- Light novel
- Written by: Kei Misawa
- Illustrated by: Natsu Mizuno
- Published by: Flex Comix
- Imprint: Comic Arc
- Published: October 15, 2021
- Anime television series
- Directed by: Hitoyuki Matsui
- Written by: Tomoko Konparu
- Music by: Michiru
- Studio: Zero-G; Grass
- Licensed by: Crunchyroll
- Original network: ANN (TV Asahi), BS Asahi
- Original run: July 5, 2026 – September 20, 2026
- Episodes: 12
- icon

The Duke's Son Claims He Won't Love Me yet Showers Me with Adoration (Japanese: 「きみを愛する気はない」と言った次期公爵様がなぜか溺愛してきます, Hepburn: Kimi o Aisuru Ki wa Nai to Itta Jiki Kōshaku-sama ga Nazeka Dekiai Shitekimasu) is a Japanese manga series written by Kei Misawa and illustrated by Natsu Mizuno. It began serialization under Flex Comix on BookLive's Comic Arc label, as well as its Comic Polaris service in February 2021. An anime television series adaptation produced by Zero-G and Grass aired from July to September 2026.

== Plot ==
Elsa Jukarainen, a woman who came from a fallen aristocrat family, was living with her family in the country of Ralt. She was suddenly proposed to by Julius Roas, the son of a duke. Elsa and her family were surprised, given her family's background and coming from a rural part of the country, but she accepts the offer. She meets Julius for the first time on their wedding day. Immediately after their wedding, his personality suddenly changes. He claims he does not truly love her and only married her out of convenience. Elsa begins her life as Julius's wife, working to be a good spouse while also trying to understand him better.

== Characters ==
Elsa Jukarainen (エルサ ユカライネン, Erusa Yukarainen)
Voiced by: Yui Ishikawa
A member of the Jukarainen family who is currently helping out at a local orphanage. Prior to marrying Julius, she had received a marriage proposal from a merchant, but ignored it.
Julius Roias (ユリウス ロイアス, Yuriusu Roiasu)
Voiced by: Soma Saito
The son of a close aide of the Prime Minister of Ralt. He married Elsa for political reasons, but immediately after their marriage, starts acting cold towards her, even giving her various conditions on how to act has his wife. Despite his actions and the nature of their marriage, he genuinely has feelings for her.
Jarmo Parnila (ヤルモ・パルニラ, Yarumo Parunira)
Voiced by: Kaito Ishikawa
Serafina Parnila (セラフィーナ・パルニラ, Serafīna Parunira)
Voiced by: Chika Anzai
Rebeka Rikkonen (レベッカ・リーコネン, Rebekka Rīkonen)
Voiced by: Hibiku Yamamura
Hannes Jukarainen (ハンネス・ユカライネン, Hannesu Yukarainen)
Voiced by: Junya Enoki
Aleksis Josef Ralt (アレクシス・ヨーセフ・ラルト, Arekushisu Yōsefu Raruto)
Voiced by: Ryōhei Kimura
Jere Ekrous (イエレ・エクルース, Iere Ekurūsu)
Voiced by: Ryōta Suzuki
Lukas Jukarainen (ルーカス・ユカライネン, Rukasu Yukarainen)
Voiced by: Daisuke Namikawa
Sofia Jukarainen (ソフィア・ユカライネン, Sofia Yukarainen)
Voiced by: Mariko Kouda
Stim (スティム, Sutimu)
Voiced by: Makoto Tamura
Tanja (ターニャ, Tānia)
Voiced by: Maaya Uchida

== Media ==
=== Manga ===
Written by Kei Misawa and illustrated by Natsu Mizuno, The Duke's Son Claims He Won't Love Me yet Showers Me with Adoration began serialization on the BookLive online service under Flex Comix's Comic Arc label on February 24, 2021, and is also being serialized on Flex Comix's Comic Polaris service. The first tankōbon volume was released on October 15, 2021, with five volumes released as of March 13, 2026. The series is released in English on the MangaPlaza website.

No.	Release date	ISBN
1	October 15, 2021	978-4-86675-173-3
2	April 15, 2022	978-4-86675-209-9
3	October 15, 2022	978-4-86675-248-8
4	October 15, 2024	978-4-86675-394-2
5	March 13, 2026	978-4-86675-495-6

=== Light novel ===
A light novel adaptation of the series was published digitally on BookLive on October 15, 2021.

=== Anime ===
An anime television series adaptation was announced on February 24, 2026. It is produced by Zero-G and Grass, and directed by Hitoyuki Matsui with series composition by Tomoko Konparu, featuring character designs by Yūko Yahiro, and music by Michiru. The series aired from July 5 to September 20, 2026, on the NUMAnimation programming block on TV Asahi and its affiliates. (Note: TV Asahi listed the series premiere on July 4 at 25:30, which is effectively July 5 at 1:30 a.m. JST.) The opening theme song is "Itsuka Chanto." (いつかちゃんと。; 'Sometime, Properly.') performed by Riria, while the ending theme song is "Saishūkai" (最終回; 'Final Episode'), performed by sorato. Crunchyroll is streaming the series.

==== Episodes ====
No.	Title	Directed by	Written by	Storyboarded by	Original release date
1	"A Marriage Just For Show"; Transliteration: "Misekake no Kekkon" (Japanese: みせかけの結婚)	Ikuhiro Matsui & Satoshi Matsukawa	Tomoko Konparu	Hitoyuki Matsui	July 5, 2026
On their wedding morning, Elsa Jukarainen meets her arranged fiancé for the very first time, Julius Roias, a Duke's son. Elsa’s impoverished noble family supports a local orphanage, and while she initially planned to marry an elderly merchant for her family's sake, she received a second proposal from Julius, aide to the prince of Rialt Kingdom. Elsa decided to accept Julius' proposal despite her brother Hannes’s warnings of a sinister plot. At the wedding, Elsa meets Julius' childhood friend Rebeka, who is impressed by her, and Serafina, who insults her as a country girl. Upon arriving at Julius’s estate, he suddenly turns cold, declaring he will never love her. He demands she follow three rules: behave like a duchess, stay out of his personal life, and publicly pretend they are happily married. Surprisingly, Elsa accepts the façade as it does benefit them both. Alone in her room, she unpacks a music box from her parents, hoping Julius might one day listen to it with her. Meanwhile, Julius recalls the prince ordered this marriage. Elsa is a descendant of both the conquered Jukarainen royalty and the victorious Rialt royalty. To prevent treasonous nobles from marrying her, he decided Julius should marry her first. Elsewhere, Serafina reports to her brother that Elsa is utterly unimpressive.
2	"...Thank You"; Transliteration: "...Arigatou Gozaimasu" (Japanese: ...ありがとうございます)	Yū Yabūchi	Tomoko Konparu	Daiki Maezawa	July 12, 2026
Julius remembers the day he realized his parents despised each other, sparking his distrust of romantic love. A month after their wedding, Elsa transforms part of the gardens into a vegetable patch. When maids reveal Julius is a picky eater who avoids vegetables, Elsa starts looking for ways to improve his health. Attending a tea party with noble wives, Elsa follows Julius' instructions to lie about their happy marriage. This relieves Rebeka, who worries about Julius' isolation. During the party, Serafina hints at past intimacy with Julius. The innocent Elsa misinterprets this as childhood friendship. Rebeka sharply reminds Serafina of her lower noble rank than Elsa, causing Serafina to leave. Rebeka notes Elsa is too innocent to realize she was being insulted. Privately, Rebeka warns Elsa that Julius uses his charm to extract information from women for the prince before abandoning them. Undeterred, Elsa asks about Julius' favourite foods, learning he loves meat gratin, which she plans to sneak minced vegetables into, and that his birthday is approaching. As the Sun Festival nears, the prince warns Julius of a plot by Serafina’s father Count Parnillo and brother Jarmo. Julius remains sceptical of his marriage, but is left flustered when Elsa surprises him with a private birthday dinner with meat gratin, cake and a coat she sewed herself.
3	"Cufflinks and a Music Box"; Transliteration: "Kafusubotan to Orugōru" (Japanese: カフスボタンとオルゴール)	Ikuhiro Matsui & Satoshi Matsukawa	Mayumi Morita	Daigo Kinoshita	July 19, 2026
Elsa attends the Sun Festival to celebrate Rialt Kingdom’s founding. Noticing she never mentions spending time with Julius, Hannes takes her to the public festivities. Serafina alerts Julius that Elsa left with another man, trying—and failing—to invite him to her private party instead. Panicked, Julius rushes after Elsa, accidentally dropping one of her cufflinks, which Serafina steals. Julius finds Elsa with Hannes and becomes jealous, until realising Hannes is her brother. Amused Julius genuinely loves Elsa, Hannes tactfully leaves them to enjoy the festival together. Later, Julius is ashamed to have lost Elsa’s cufflink, while Elsa is upset after accidentally breaking her music box. When a local repairman cannot repair the box, Julius shows it to Prince Aleksis, who identifies its Liberum Kingdom origin. Aleksis is amused by Julius's cufflink mishap, and urges him to apologize to Elsa quickly. Julius leaves on official business, leaving Elsa upset he never returned the box and fearing he threw it away. Days later, Julius returns from Liberum where he had the box repaired and even purchased her a matching flower hair ornament. Overjoyed, Elsa finally shares the box’s song with him. Serafina plots to use the stolen cufflink for a sinister scheme.
4	"Behind a Smile"; Transliteration: "Biemi no Uragawa" (Japanese: 微笑みの裏側)	Masato Miyoshi & Shuhei Yagi	Ai Yoshimura	Satoshi Nakagawa	July 26, 2026 (Note: This episode aired at 1:50 a.m. JST, 20 minutes after the original air time on ANN.)
Unaware Serafina is her enemy, Elsa hosts a tea party featuring vegetable-based sweets. Spiteful and jealous, Serafina gives Elsa the missing cufflink, implying Julius lost it during an intimate encounter. Again misunderstanding the insult, Elsa innocently returns the cufflink to Julius, who feels guilty and worries her lack of reaction means Elsa lacks any romantic interest in him. The next day, Elsa delivers forgotten documents to Julius's office. Getting lost in the palace, she encounters Serafina’s brother, Jarmo, who warns her that Julius will break her heart like all the other women from his past. Though Hannes cautions her that scheming nobles like Jarmo always have ulterior motives, Elsa naively assumes Jarmo was merely being helpful. At the office, Aleksis encourages Julius to take a tea break with Elsa. Julius is hesitant to eat the carrot cake she brought, but Elsa pleasantly surprises him by revealing she has been secretly hiding vegetables in his breakfast for weeks. He tries the carrot cake and finds it delicious as well. The eavesdropping Aleksis, Hannes and Jere tease Julius about not eating his vegetables. Jarmo smugly watches Elsa leave, confident that Serafina was right about Elsa being naïve enough to be easily manipulated.
5	"The Sound of Distant Rain"; Transliteration: "Tōi Ameon" (Japanese: 遠い雨音)	Kohei Kamiya & Seop Shin-min	Tomoko Konparu	Motomasa Maeda	August 2, 2026
Aleksis announces that Julius must take Elsa on a date. Julius struggles to choose an outfit since Elsa usually dresses plainly, but he is completely captivated by her attractive date attire. Knowing her love for plants, Julius takes her to a new botanical garden. Though baffled by her interest in carnivorous plants, he appreciates her moving them along when insects make him uncomfortable. While discussing poisonous plants, Julius nearly confesses his love, but they are interrupted by Jarmo, who brags about his father financing the garden. Julius feels insecure that he impresses other women effortlessly yet keeps stumbling with Elsa. Uncomfortable with her connection to Jarmo, he reassures Elsa she did nothing wrong, keeping quiet about the Parnillo family's suspected crimes. Sheltering from the rain, Julius quietly admits he is glad he married her, though Elsa misses it over the noise of the downpour. The rain and overwork leave Julius with a severe fever. Dreaming of the rainy day his mother caught his father being unfaithful, he awakens to find Elsa stayed by his side all night. After braving her family’s vile medicinal vegetable recipe, Julius realizes he truly considers her family. After recovering, Aleksis asks Julius to investigate at Count Parnillo's upcoming party.
6	"The Trap Hidden at the Soirée"; Transliteration: "Yakai ni Hisomu Wana" (Japanese: 夜会にひそむ罠)	Motomasa Maeda	Mayumi Morita	Daiki Maezawa	August 9, 2026 (Note: This episode aired at 2:00 a.m. JST, 30 minutes after the regular air time on ANN.)
Aleksis tasks Julius with identifying potential anti-royalist nobles at the party. To avoid raising suspicion, Julius asks Elsa to attend with him. At the event, Serafina monopolizes Julius all evening to introduce him to her friends, fuelling gossip among the other wives that they are lovers and Elsa merely his wife for appearances sake, leaving Elsa deeply distressed. Taking advantage, Jarmo sends a drunken Viscount Helco to molest Elsa to test Julius's vulnerabilities. Hannes notices and distracts Serafina so Julius can intervene, rescuing Elsa by threatening to audit Helco’s corrupt iron mining business, a rare public outburst that piques Jarmo's interest. Julius apologises to Elsa for the trouble and not spending the party with her. Days later, Serafina is still angry she failed to seduce Julius again. She is thrilled when Julius summons her to the palace, so she makes an effort to appear even more beautiful for him. Instead, Julius confronts her deliberately causing the rumours of their affair, demanding she publicly deny them because they are hurting Elsa and stating firmly that nothing will ever happen between them. Humiliated and consumed by jealousy, Serafina vows never to forgive him.
7	"An Unexpected Gift"; Transliteration: "Omoigakenai Okurimono" (Japanese: 思いがけない贈り物)	Shuhei Yagi & Masato Miyoshi	Ai Yoshimura	Daigo Kinoshita	August 16, 2026
Jarmo finds it funny when Julius follows up on his threat and ruins Helco via an audit of his business. He is also intrigued Julius rejected Serafina, despite her unwitting value as a source of information. Hannes gives Julius a book for Elsa's birthday, making Julius realize he never bothered to ask when her birthday was, even though she celebrated his. After giving her the book, he asks to spend her birthday together, making her heart race. Though a last-minute meeting makes Julius late for their outing, Elsa remains understanding of his work. He surprises her with opera tickets based on Hannes' book. After the show, Julius admits he never cared about birthdays before meeting her, but now understands their appeal. The next day, inspired by a blue rose in the opera, Elsa buys a rose for her garden. Getting lost on her way home, she stumbles upon a church-run orphanage. She overhears the cruel owner demanding the children do dangerous manual labour instead of studying, since they lack a teacher. Impulsively, Elsa steps in to ask about volunteering as the new teacher. Julius mentions he plans to take time off once his workload eases, so Elsa decides not to mention the orphanage until then. However, word of what happened reaches Jarmo.
8	"Misunderstandings and Falsehoods"; Transliteration: "Gokai to Fujitsu" (Japanese: 誤解と不実)	Kohei Kamiya	Tomoko Konparu	Satoshi Nakagawa	August 23, 2026
Elsa becomes teacher at the orphanage without telling Julius. On her way home, she meets Jarmo who feigns interest in her job and touches her hair, which Julius secretly witnesses. Recalling his parents' infidelities, Julius suspects Elsa of having an affair and begins avoiding her at home, leaving Elsa confused and worried about him. Distracted at work, Julius worries that by asking Elsa for a loveless marriage he has driven her to seek love elsewhere. However, he encounters the orphanage Nun there to ask the palace to increase the orphanage's budget. She mentions her new teacher is a noble wife who loves gardening. Realizing the truth, Julius buys the orphanage, imprisons the former owner for embezzling the missing budget money, and equips the classroom with additional teaching supplies. Elsa apologizes for keeping her job a secret out of fear he would forbid it. Julius apologizes for suspecting her of infidelity, but asks that she avoid letting other men touch her to prevent future misunderstandings. As he touches her, Elsa realizes his touch makes her feel uniquely warm inside.
9	"Jarmo's Vow"; Transliteration: "Yarumo no Chikai" (Japanese: ヤルモの誓い)	Akira Shimizu	Mayumi Morita	Motomasa Maeda	August 30, 2026
A flashback reveals an orphan boy taken from a workhouse, transformed into "Jarmo Parnillo," and adopted by Lord Parnillo as his male heir, revealing he has been searching for Jarmo as the missing son of his deceased brother. Desperate to avoid returning to the workhouse, Jarmo studied fiercely to earn Parnillo's approval. At the academy, he resented Julius for outperforming him in everything, and was furious to realise despite humiliating him over and over again, Julius did not even know his name. In the present, Jarmo remains determined to make Julius feel invisible and worthless. To acquire supplies for the orphanage and school, Julius suggests hosting a community bazaar to trade items, boost local relations, and raise awareness. During the event, an upset student runs off after his sister scolds him for asking rude questions about Elsa’s marriage to Julius. Later, Aleksis orders Julius to investigate delays on a regional construction project in Kreisa. Julius hesitates, reluctant to spend time away from Elsa. Meanwhile, Jarmo personally assists the project to secure Lord Adolf’s vote for his father in the upcoming Chairman elections. Hoping to mend recent awkwardness between them, Julius asks Elsa to join him on the trip to Kreisa.
10	"Julius's Wish"; Transliteration: "Yuriasu no Negaigoto" (Japanese: ユリウスの願い事)	Fumio Maezono	Mayumi Morita	Motomasa Maeda	September 6, 2026
Arriving in Kreisa, Julius and Elsa visit Lord Adolf Escola, his wife Linne, and their daughter Nina, an aspiring young farmer whose instant bond with Elsa makes Elsa miss her parents. At a nearby hotel, the couple realizes newlyweds sharing separate rooms would raise suspicion, marking their first time sharing a room. Julius insists on the sofa while Elsa takes the bed. Used to sharing beds with her brother and parents, Elsa remains unaffected, worsening Julius' worry she doesn't view him romantically. The next morning, Jarmo arrives as Adolf’s guest and manipulates his way onto Julius' inspection tour, where even Elsa senses the animosity between them. Adolf explains delays to the canal restoration project, assuring Julius that Count Parnilla will soon put the project back on schedule. Despite his suspicions of Jarmo, Julius takes Elsa to the village festival. They meet Linne and Nina running a stall selling wish-granting bracelets, which Julius buys for them both. Linne suggests taking a sunset boat ride on the canal. Aboard the lantern-lit boat, Julius wishes for Elsa to call him by his first name, which she nervously does, making him happy. Meanwhile, Adolf agrees to vote for Parnilla as the next Parliament Chairman.
11	"Trapped . . ."; Transliteration: "Tojikomarerete…" (Japanese: 閉じ込められて…)	Motomasa Maeda, Shūhei Yagi & Masato Miyoshi	Tomoko Konparu	Satoshi Nakagawa	September 13, 2026
During a mill inspection with Julius, Elsa decides to buy more cord for making bracelets. The scheming Jarmo bribes an employee to lock him and Elsa in a storeroom together. Remembering her promise to Julius to let no one touch her, Elsa keeps her distance, but Jarmo interrogates her about her marriage. His questions painfully remind her that her marriage was merely a political arrangement to benefit her family, bringing her to tears. Jarmo briefly feels guilty before his resentment toward Julius flares up, and he asks if she would ever leave Julius for him. Julius suddenly rescues them and, seeing Elsa crying, blames Jarmo. Elsa lies to defuse the situation, claiming she was simply frightened by being trapped. On their journey home, Julius apologizes for leaving her with Jarmo and admits he brought her to the countryside to try ease her homesickness. Touched by his care, Elsa realizes she hid her tears because she has genuinely fallen in love with Julius and fears he would reject her to maintain their loveless marriage. Meanwhile, Serafina notices Jarmo is not himself after his Kreisa trip. Jarmo later panics when Lord Adolf breaks their political alliance by declaring neutrality, leaving Count Parnillo without his crucial vote.
12	"A Promise on the Night of Falling Stars"; Transliteration: "Hoshifuru Yoru no Yakusoku" (Japanese: 星降る夜の約束)	Hitoyuki Matsui & Kōhei Kamiya	Tomoko Konparu	Daigo Kinoshita & Hitoyuki Matsui	September 20, 2026
Jarmo fears admitting to his father that he failed to secure Adolf's vote. Elsa vows to hide her love for Julius, though he notices her unusual coldness toward him, a newlywed trouble the long-time married Aleksis views with gleeful amusement. Rebeka deduces Julius loves Elsa after learning he invited her to use his first name. She explains to Elsa Julius's unfaithful parents and lonely childhood forced him to isolate his heart to avoid pain. At the palace, Julius warns Jarmo never to involve Elsa in his schemes. Their confrontation reveals deep misconceptions between them: Jarmo envied Julius’s school success but Julius envied Jarmo’s supportive family. Realizing Julius only ignored him at school because of his own pain, Jarmo feels guilty for everything he did against Julius and Elsa. Their exchange prompts Julius to apologize to Elsa for declaring their marriage loveless. Jarmo confesses losing Adolf's vote to his father, who warmly reassures Jarmo it was only one lost vote and he has always been proud of him, bringing Jarmo tears of relief. That night, during a meteor shower, Julius apologizes to Elsa and asks for a real marriage. Happy, Elsa agrees, calling him by his first name as they kiss.

== Reception ==
It was reported with the anime adaptation's announcement that the series had over 2 million copies in circulation as of February 2026.
