= Bonjour Sweet Love Patisserie =

Japanese original net animation series

Bonjour♪恋味パティスリー (Bonjūru Koiaji Patisurii)
- Manga
- Written by: Utako Yukihiro
- Published by: Kodansha
- Magazine: Aria
- Published: October 28, 2014
- Original net animation
- Directed by: Noriaki Akitaya
- Produced by: Marina Sasaki, Takuro Tsuchiya
- Written by: Ryō Aoki
- Music by: Takahiro Yamada
- Studio: Silver Link; Connect
- Licensed by: Crunchyroll
- Released: October 10, 2014 – March 20, 2015
- Runtime: 5 minutes
- Episodes: 24
- Video game

Itoshi no Chocolatier
- Developer: Ciagram Co, Ltd.
- Publisher: Ciagram Co, Ltd.
- Genre: Visual novel, Dating sim
- Platform: iOS, Android
- Released: JP: December 3, 2015

Bonjour Sweet Love Patisserie (Bonjour♪恋味パティスリー, Bonjūru Koiaji Patisurii) is a Japanese original net animation series. It premiered on October 10, 2014, on Niconico, and a day later on NTV On Demand and Hulu. The series is originally based on a mobile game that is still in development.

== Plot ==
The story follows Sayuri Haruno, a girl who attends an elite confectionery school Fleurir on a scholarship to follow her dream to open a pastry shop. There she meets several charming young men.

== Characters ==
=== Main characters ===
Sayuri Haruno (春野 小百合, Haruno Sayuri)
Voiced by: Yui Ishikawa
She is the main character of the anime. She is a 16-year-old girl who has started studying in the Fleurir Academy. She is a lovely, talented, and friendly person that is given a scholarship to the Academy. Sannomiya calls her "Sayori" as if she were a fish. She is very innocent most of the time and always tries to do her best to help others. She has no parents so she lives in the academy along with Ran, a photo which she keeps in her room suggest that the couple holding the child are her parents and that her father was a pâtissier and wanted to follow in his footsteps.
Ryo Kouduki (皐月 遼, Kōdzuki Ryō)
Voiced by: Kaito Ishikawa
He is Sayuri's classmate and partner for the first time they cooked. He can be quite serious and has a lot of talent because he comes from a family of bakers. He seems to have a crush on Sayuri because he gets jealous of the attention that the teachers pay to her. In episode 9, he tried to confess his feelings twice but was interrupted both times. And then again in episode 16, but again, interrupted.
Mitsuki Aoi (葵井 三斗希, Aoi Mitsuki)
Voiced by: Tetsuya Kakihara
He's one of the three professional teachers that the academy has. He is known as the "prince of chocolate" and has two brothers that work at their family restaurant. He seems to have a crush on Sayuri.
Gilbert Hanafusa (花房 ジルベール, Hanafusa Jirubēru)
Voiced by: Ryohei Kimura
He's one of the three teachers. He is French. He's an extrovert, honest, dedicated, and has a happy personality. He always says that he loves Japan and is interested in learning a lot about the country and its culture since he was child because his grandmother was Japanese. He seems to have a crush on Sayuri and went on a "date" with her where they went sightseeing around Tokyo.
Yoshinosuke Suzumi (涼 芳之助, Suzumi Yoshinosuke)
Voiced by: Hikaru Midorikawa
He is one of the three teachers. He's very interested in Japanese sweets and often tries creating new ones. He is quite inexpressive and difficult to talk to but talked to Sayuri with ease when they prepared some pastries for the head teacher. He has a fiancé; however, it seems that he has not met her or that they do not get along well.

=== Supporting characters ===
Ibuki Aoi (葵井 一吹, Aoi Ibuki)
Voiced by: Katsuyuki Konishi
He is one of Mitsuki's brothers that work in the family restaurant.
Jin Aoi (葵井 仁, Aoi Jin)
Voiced by: Wataru Hatano
He's Mitsuki's other brother that works in the family restaurant.
Ran Mochizuki (望月 蘭, Mochizuki Ran)
Voiced by: Ayane Sakura
She is Sayuri's best friend.
Tsubaki Sannomiya (三ノ宮 椿, Sannomiya Tsubaki)
Voiced by: Atsuko Enomoto
She is Sayuri's classmate and the only heir of the conglomerate, Sannomiya Group. She thinks of Sayuri as her rival and has a huge crush on Mitsuki.
Nadeshiko Minagawa (皆川 撫子, Minagawa Nadeshiko)
Voiced by: Yoshiko Sakakibara
She is the head teacher of Fleurir. She has kept an eye on Sayuri since the first day and constantly accuses her of illicit sexual relations with teachers whenever she sees her alone with a teacher. Naddeshiko is good friends with Gilbert's grandmother, because at a young age she got a scholarship to study in France to becoming a pâtissier and Gilbert's grandmother was a teacher there; it is also the reason how Gilbert came to work at Fleurir Academy.
Marshmallow (Maro) (ましゅマロ (マロ), Mashiyumaro (Maro))
Voiced by: Sawako Hata
A round marshmallow-like creature who introduces Fleurir Collections.

== Episode list ==
No.	Title	Original release date
1	"Lesson 1"	October 11, 2014
Sayuri and her new friend Ran Mochizuki attend their first day at Fleurir. Ran mentions Sayuri being there on a scholarship, and Tsubaki Sannomiya and her two friends overhear and confront Sayuri about it. Ran gets into an argument with them, and Ryou Kouzuki gets pissed at the girls for blocking the hallway. He stares at Sayuri and notices that she looks similar to someone he knows. Headmistress Minagawa breaks up the girls and warns Sayuri about getting into arguments when she's on a scholarship. The girls attend the opening ceremony where they meet the three pâtissier teachers, Mitsuki Aoi, Gilbert Hanafusa and Yoshinosuke Suzumi. Everyone notices how handsome they are while Sayuri remembers the headmistress's strict policy against student-teacher relationships. Sayuri promises herself that she'll focus on becoming a pâtissier.
2	"Lesson 2"	October 18, 2014
Sayuri is paired up with Ryou in an orientation exercise. She realizes Ryou's extreme talent for baking, due to coming from a family of bakers. The three teachers then show their own skills and win over the students.
3	"Lesson 3"	October 25, 2014
Ryou allows Sayuri to help him bake during the exercise after seeing her being bullied by Sannomiya. Ryou and Sayuri's cake turns out delicious, and the instructors show their own desserts. The students all try each other's creations, and Ran tells Sayuri that the headmistress seems to be keeping her eye on Sayuri.
4	"Lesson 4"	November 1, 2014
Suzumi invites Sayuri to go shopping for ingredients to make a dessert for his friend's birthday. They bond over baking, and Minagawa catches them in the act and berates them. Sayuri muses that Suzumi understands her and she would like to meet his fiancée.
5	"Lesson 5"	November 8, 2014
Hanafusa asks Sayuri to take him on a tour around Tokyo so he can learn more about Japan in order to create a dessert with a Japanese essence.
6	"Lesson 6"	November 15, 2014
Hanafusa and Sayuri visit the chocolatier shop owned by Mitsuki's family. Mitsuki's brothers treat them to chocolates, and Minagawa shows up, once again catching Sayuri with a teacher.
7	"Lesson 7"	November 22, 2014
Sayuri struggles to create satisfactory cream puffs and goes to the garden for inspiration. She meets Mitsuki there, and they talk about his family's shop. Ryou watches in disdain from above.
8	"Lesson 8"	November 29, 2014
The Fleurir students head to the beach for the school's Okinawa training camp and play beach volleyball. The game ends with the teachers and Ryou ending up in the hospital with sunburns. They were very upset and had to stay inside....
9	"Lesson 9"	December 6, 2014
A woman on the beach drags Ryou and Sayuri to a "best couples" contest. They end up winning, and Ryou protects Sayuri from a group of drunk men.
10	"Lesson 10"	December 13, 2014
Ryou injures his arm from protecting Sayuri on the beach, and Sayuri brings sweets to him in the hospital. Sayuri comes across an older lady who asks her for help finding her hotel. The lady turns out to be Hanafusa's grandmother.
11	"Lesson 11"	December 20, 2014
Sayuri has dinner with Hanafusa and his grandmother, and she worries that she will not make it in time to visit Ryou.
12	"Lesson 12"	December 27, 2014
The Fleurir students and teachers go hiking in the fall to find inspiration for new desserts.
13	"Lesson 13"	January 3, 2015
The teachers showcase their handmade lunch skills on the hiking trip, and Sayuri gets a chance to talk to Ryou alone.
14	"Lesson 14"	January 10, 2015
Sayuri falls sick and stays in the hospital. The teachers and Ryou bring desserts to her to help her feel better.
15	"Lesson 15"	January 17, 2015
Sayuri has a strange dream about each of the teachers and Ryou turning into maro.
16	"Lesson 16"	January 24, 2015
Ryou and Sayuri go Christmas shopping, and she asks Ryou who she reminded him of, but he dismisses the question. They sit and talk on a bench. Ryou begins to ask her an important question, but they are ambushed by the teachers.
17	"Lesson 17"	January 31, 2015
Sayuri, Ryou, Hanafusa, and two of Sannomiya's friends go head-to-head in a snowball fight against Mitsuki, Suzumi, Ran, and Sannomiya. The fight ends in a tie with all the men ending up in the hospital once more with colds.
18	"Lesson 18"	February 7, 2015
Sayuri and Ran visit a shrine for New Years, and run into Mitsuki, his brothers, and Sannomiya. Sayuri is melancholy, thinking about graduation.
19	"Lesson 19"	February 13, 2015
Ran and Sayuri visit the three teachers at school and play badminton, with the winners getting to paint funny faces on the losers.
20	"Lesson 20"	February 20, 2015
Sayuri makes Valentine's Day chocolates and gives them to Ryou, the three teachers, Ran, and Sannomiya and her friends. Mitsuki gets called to the headmistress's office and is told to pick participants for an unknown event.
21	"Lesson 21"	February 27, 2015
Sayuri and the teachers at Fleurir are invited by the headmistress to participate in the "Galaxy Dream Confections" competition, which Fleurir are the previous winners. At the event, they are confronted by a rival team: Kashuu Academy.
22	"Lesson 22"	March 6, 2015
The Fleurir and Kashuu Academy teams progress to the final round, where the theme is "What you wish to convey to the future". Mitsuki asks Sayuri to decide what the team will create.
23	"Lesson 23"	March 13, 2015
In the final round, Kashuu Academy finishes their creation first, a croquembouche. But the Fleurir team win with Sayuri's idea, a confectionery Earth.
24	"Lesson 24"	March 20, 2015
It is Graduation day and Sayuri says farewell to all the teachers.
