= Attack on Titan: Humanity in Chains =

2013 video game

- North American cover art
- Developer: Spike Chunsoft
- Publishers: Examu (JP); Atlus (NA/EU)
- Artist: Ooeiehruri
- Series: Attack on Titan
- Platform: Nintendo 3DS
- Release: Original version: JP: December 5, 2013; Chain: JP: December 4, 2014; NA: May 12, 2015; EU: July 2, 2015
- Genre: Action game
- Mode: Single-player

Attack on Titan: Humanity in Chains (進撃の巨人～人類最後の翼～, Shingeki no Kyojin ~Jinrui Saigo no Tsubasa~; lit. "Attack on Titan: The Last Wings of Humanity"), known in Europe as Attack on Titan: Humanity in Chains, is an action game developed and published by Spike Chunsoft for the Nintendo 3DS, based on Hajime Isayama's Attack on Titan manga series. The game was originally released in Japan on December 5, 2013, with an updated version, Attack on Titan: Jinrei Saigo no Tsubasa CHAIN, released on December 4, 2014. This version of the game was localized by Atlus and released on the Nintendo eShop in North America on May 12, 2015, and in Europe on July 2, 2015.

== Gameplay ==
The game casts players in role of characters from the Attack on Titan series, or a character they created, as they take hold of three-dimensional maneuver gear to attack Titans, giants that hunt and devour humans. The game's most recent iteration features a single player story mode, local and online multiplayer, and Circle Pad Pro support.

== Reception ==
Reception

Aggregate score
Aggregator	Score
Metacritic	46/100

Review scores
Publication	Score
Destructoid	7/10
GameSpot	4/10
IGN	4.9/10
Nintendo Life	7/10
Nintendo World Report	3/10
USgamer	1.5/5

The game received predominantly negative reviews. It was given a 4.9 by IGN. It has a score of 46/100 on Metacritic. GameSpot awarded it a score of 4.0 out of 10, saying "Between the can't-look-away morbidity of being eaten and watching the ensemble cast persevere, there's no denying the draw of Attack on Titan and the potential for a superb game adaptation. Humanity in Chains just isn't that game." Nintendo World Report awarded it 3 out of ten, saying "What I got is something that you should have no business playing, and I look forward to reclaiming over 12,000 blocks of 3DS memory very soon." USgamer awarded it 1.5 out of 5, saying "If you enjoy the series, your time would be better spent just watching it all over again." Destructoid was more positive, awarding it 7 out of 10, and stated the game "often can't shake the limitations of the 3DS platform, but it captures most of what makes the anime's world so captivating."

== See also ==
- Attack on Titan (video game)
- Attack on Titan 2
