= Battlefield Waltz =

2014 video game

- Developer: Otomate (Idea Factory)
- Publishers: JP: Idea Factory; NA/EU: Idea Factory International
- Platforms: PlayStation Vita, Nintendo Switch
- Release: PlayStation Vita: JP: November 20, 2014; Nintendo Switch: JP: April 13, 2023; NA/EU: April 8, 2025
- Genres: Visual novel, otome game
- Mode: Single-player

Battlefield Waltz (Note: Known in Japan as Senjou no Waltz (戦場の円舞曲)) is a 2014 otome game and visual novel developed and published by Otomate/Idea Factory. It was released for the PlayStation Vita on November 20, 2014, in Japan, and it was later released for the Nintendo Switch on April 13, 2023, in Japan and on April 8, 2025, in North America and Europe.

== Plot ==
The game takes place in the fictional continent of Ortesia, whose territories are divided into the East and West. While trying to escape an attack on her village, a girl named Lan (by default) unintentionally awakens a legendary and powerful cursed sword that fuses itself with her. To secure the cursed sword, Lan is made to enroll in Nirvana, the Western countries' military academy.

== Gameplay ==
As Battlefield Waltz is a visual novel, gameplay primarily consists of reading text and making decisions that determine which route the story takes and alter characters' level of affection for the protagonist. Players are also provided with a story chart that allows them to go directly to certain points in the game's plot.

Each love interest's story route has a Happy Ending and a Bad Ending. Reaching endings grants currency that can be spent to unlock bonus content such as artwork, and seeing the five main love interests' Happy Endings grants access to additional story content including the sixth love interest's route.

== Development and release ==
The game was released in Japan for the PlayStation Vita on November 20, 2014.

A Nintendo Switch port titled Senjou no Waltz for Nintendo Switch was announced during the Otomate Party 2022 event, and was released on April 13, 2023, in Japan. Idea Factory International announced their license of the game for Nintendo Switch at Anime Expo 2024, and they released the game in North America and Europe on April 8, 2025.

== Reception ==
Reception

Aggregate score
| Aggregator | Score |
|---|---|
| Metacritic | 77/100 |

Review scores
| Publication | Score |
|---|---|
| RPGFan | 88/100 |
| Digitally Downloaded | 4.5/5 |
| Siliconera | 8/10 |
| Anime News Network | A- |

Battlefield Waltz received generally favorable reviews, according to the review aggregation website Metacritic.
