= 8th Seiyu Awards =

2014 voice acting award in Tokyo

- Awarded for: Voice acting in Japan
- Date: March 1, 2014
- Location: JOQR Media Plus Hall; Minato, Tokyo
- Country: Japan

Highlights
- Best Lead Actor: Yūki Kaji
- Best Lead Actress: Rina Satō
- Website: www.seiyuawards.jp

The 8th Seiyu Awards ceremony was held on March 1, 2014.

Winners	Agency	Character	Anime
Best Actor in leading role
Yūki Kaji	VIMS	Eren Yeager	Attack on Titan
Best Actress in leading role
Rina Satō	Haikyō	Mikoto Misaka	A Certain Scientific Railgun S
Best Actor in supporting roles
Yoshimasa Hosoya	Mausu Promotion	Yusuke Asahina	Brothers Conflict
Best Actress in supporting roles
Yui Ishikawa	Sunaoka Office	Mikasa Ackerman	Attack on Titan
Best Rookie actors
Kaito Ishikawa	Pro-Fit	Harutora Tsuchimikado	Tokyo Ravens
Daiki Yamashita	Arts Vision	Sakamichi Onoda	Yowamushi Pedal
Best Rookie actress
Maaya Uchida	I'm Enterprise	Hajime Ichinose	Gatchaman Crowds
Best Personality
Winner	Agency	Radio Programs	Broadcasting Station
N/A	N/A	N/A	N/A
Best Musical Performance
Winner		Record Label	
Mamoru Miyano		King Records	
Winners		Agency	
Special Achievement Award
Kenji Utsumi		Ken Production (final career)	
Ryōko Kinomiya		Haikyō (final career)	
Achievement Award
Rokurō Naya		Mausu Promotion	
Keaton Yamada		Remax	
Synergy Award
Girls und Panzer (Mai Fuchigami)
Kei Tomiyama Memorial Award (Topical Award)
Shin-ichiro Miki		81 Produce	
Kids Family Award
Kumiko Higa		81 Produce	
Kazue Takahashi Memorial Award
Kotono Mitsuishi		Lasley Arrow	
Most Votes Award
Hiroshi Kamiya		Aoni Production	
Special Award
Anpanman (Keiko Toda, Ryūsei Nakao)
