= Attack on Titan (video game) =

2016 video game

- Developer: Omega Force
- Publisher: Koei Tecmo
- Director: Tomoyuki Kitamura
- Producer: Hisashi Koinuma
- Designer: Kotaro Hirata
- Programmer: Eita Karasawa
- Writer: Ryohei Hayashi
- Composers: Shinichiro Nakamura; Yugen Umemura; Junya Ishiguro
- Series: Attack on Titan
- Platforms: PlayStation 3; PlayStation 4; PlayStation Vita; Windows; Xbox One
- Release: JP: February 18, 2016 (exc. PC, Xbox); PAL: August 26, 2016; NA: August 30, 2016; Windows: WW: August 26, 2016
- Genre: Hack and slash
- Modes: Single-player, multiplayer

Attack on Titan (Japanese: 進撃の巨人, Hepburn: Shingeki no Kyojin), known in PAL regions as A.O.T.: Wings of Freedom, is a 2016 hack and slash video game developed by Omega Force and published by Koei Tecmo. It is based on the animated series Attack on Titan, which is an adaptation of Hajime Isayama's manga series of the same name. It was initially released for PlayStation 3, PlayStation 4, and PlayStation Vita in Japan. It was released on February 18, 2016, in Japan. It was released internationally in August 2016 alongside ports to Windows and Xbox One. A sequel, Attack on Titan 2, was released in 2018.

== Gameplay ==
The game's visuals matches that of the anime series and it features one player fighting multiple enemies. The 3D Maneuvering Gear can be used to ascend to high areas.

The game features ten playable characters. Initially, only three can be selected. But as players progress through Attack (story) mode, more characters are unlocked. These characters include Eren Yeager, Mikasa Ackerman, Armin Arlert, Jean Kirschtein, Connie Springer, Sasha Braus, Krista Lenz, Levi, Zoë Hange, and Erwin Smith.

Attack Mode is divided into two parts: the main campaign and survey missions. The main campaign allows you to play through the original story of Attack on Titan, with an epilogue featuring extra battles based on the manga. You can upgrade your equipment, create new weapons, and purchase a war horse to use on the battlefield from your home base.

To access more chapters of the epilogue, you need to complete survey missions and finish side quests from characters in the home base. Completing these missions rewards you with EXP for playable characters, materials for upgrading, and other extras in the gallery.

== Plot ==
The game retells key moments from the Attack on Titan manga (chapters 1 through 33), which are also covered by the first season of the anime series, in addition to new scenarios involving the key characters.

In 845, when Eren was just 10 years old, the "Colossal Titan" suddenly appeared. Large enough to breach the Wall, it allowed other Titans to rampage through the city. One of them ate Carla, Eren's mother. With the so-called "Armored Titan" now preventing access, Wall Maria was abandoned and humanity were forced to fall back to Wall Rose. Having lost his family, his home and his dreams, Eren swore revenge on the Titans. Aiming to become a member of the Scout Regiment, he joined the "104th Cadet Corps."

Five years after Eren enlisted, the "Colossal Titan" suddenly appeared again. Eren tried to fight it alone but failed to defeat it. He returned to headquarters and then takes a squad out himself, but the mission was a failure with Eren suffering a terrible injury to his leg and many soldiers being killed. When Armin was about to be eaten by a Titan, Eren sacrifices his life to save him. Immediately before the Trost District Wall was destroyed by the Colossal Titan, elite members of the Scout Regiment were on a mission outside the Wall. The principal role of the Scout Regiment was to scout beyond the Wall, seeking a way to take back Wall Maria which was lost 5 years previously. Setting up supply bases in destroyed towns and villages, they sought to secure a route for a large force to make their way to the Shiganshina District, where the Wall was destroyed. Fighting with the Titans outside the wall as they go, they sought to secure the route while making new discoveries along the way.

The brave resistance offered by the Garrison Regiment, combined with the return of the Scout Regiment, was enough to keep Wall Rose safe from the Titans. Within the Walls, however, the same chaos descended as was experienced when Wall Maria was lost 5 years previously. Not only has the Colossal Titan attacked humanity again, but the damaged Wall has been repaired - unbelievably - by the "power of the Titans." Is Eren an ally for humanity or just another enemy? As the debate continues within the Walls, the Scout Regiment - newly joined by Eren - begin their 57th mission to the outside world.

== Development ==
The game was first announced at Gamescom by Koei Tecmo. A new trailer was unveiled on November 6, 2015, in addition to details about the Collector's Edition. It was released for the PlayStation 3, PlayStation 4, and PlayStation Vita in Japan. Subsequent versions for Windows and Xbox One were announced following its Western announcement by Koei Tecmo. Initially the English voice cast were going to record dialogue, however the budget would not allow for this.

== Reception ==
Reception

Aggregate score
Aggregator	Score
Metacritic	PS4: 74/100; XONE: 77/100

Review scores
Publication	Score
Destructoid	8/10
Famitsu	34/40
GameSpot	6/10
IGN	7.3/10
PlayStation Official Magazine – UK	7/10

Attack on Titan sold approximately 150,682 copies in its first week in Japan, outselling Street Fighter V during that week. As of April 28, Koei Tecmo announced it had sold 280,000 copies in total in Japan. As of Koei Tecmo's 2016/17 FY report, the game has sold in 350,000 copies in the West and a cumulative 700,000 copies worldwide.

Attack on Titan received generally positive reviews. Famitsu's four reviewers awarded it consecutive scores of 8/9/9/8, which added up to an overall score of 34/40. PlayStation LifeStyle awarded it a score of 8.0 out of 10, saying "Attack on Titan is an excellent example of a passion project made right." However, in other places, it got mixed reviews.

== Sequel ==
A sequel, Attack on Titan 2, was announced in August 2017 and was released in March 2018.
