= Attack on Titan 2 =

2018 video game

- Developer: Omega Force
- Publisher: Koei Tecmo
- Director: Hideo Suzuki
- Producer: Hisashi Koinuma
- Designer: Kotaro Hirata
- Programmer: Tomohisa Yoshikawa
- Writers: Ryohei Hayashi; Mari Okamoto; Masahiko Kochi
- Composers: Ayako Toyoda; Yugen Umemura; Junya Ishiguro
- Series: Attack on Titan
- Platforms: Nintendo Switch; PlayStation 4; PlayStation Vita; Windows; Xbox One; Stadia
- Release: JP: March 15, 2018; WW: March 20, 2018; Stadia: WW: November 18, 2019
- Genre: Hack and slash
- Modes: Single-player, multiplayer

Attack on Titan 2 (Japanese: 進撃の巨人 2, Hepburn: Shingeki no Kyojin 2), known in PAL regions as A.O.T. 2, is a 2018 hack and slash video game developed by Omega Force and published by Koei Tecmo as a sequel to their 2016 game. It is based on Hajime Isayama's manga series Attack on Titan. It was released for Nintendo Switch, PlayStation 4, PlayStation Vita, Windows and Xbox One, with a port to Stadia releasing the following year. A sequel, Attack on Titan 3, was announced in June 2026 and will be published on 10 December 2026.

== Plot ==
The game covers the plot of the first 50 chapters of Attack on Titan (also covered by the first two seasons of the anime adaptation).

The player primarily experiences major events of the series through an original custom character who fights and interacts with characters of the manga. As a child, the player's character joins the 104th Cadet Corp, intending to slay the Armored Titan for killing their parents during the breach of Wall Maria.

The last mission of the base game has an original ending, non-canonical to both the anime and manga.

The DLC "Final Battle" covers chapters 51 to 90 of the manga (also covered by the third season of the anime).

== Gameplay ==
The game features cel-shaded graphics, fast-paced aerial combat, and also features the player defeating the titans in large, open areas. Key new features over the first title include a story-mode that's entirely playable in co-op, as well as a character creator. When not in combat beyond the walls, players can befriend and bond with the series' cast of characters, such as Eren Yeager, in a mode called "Daily Life."

== Development ==
Developed by Omega Force and published by Koei Tecmo, development launched shortly after completion of the first title. A key focus was on making the AI more intelligent, as well as making the game more difficult in comparison to its predecessor. Koei Tecmo worked closely with the manga's publisher Kodansha and writer Hajime Isayama in the creation of additional elements to the story. Initially the English voice cast were going to record dialogue but this was not realised due to time constraints, very much like the first game. A demo of the game was released in Japan on April 26, 2019, and worldwide on May 7, 2019, and it was distributed until July 31, 2019. The DLC "The Final Battle" was released on July 4, 2019, in Japan and on July 5 in North America and Europe.

== Reception ==
Reception

Aggregate score
Aggregator	Score
Metacritic	(PC) 78/100 (PS4) 75/100 (XONE) 74/100 (Switch) 72/100

Review scores
Publication	Score
Famitsu	36/40; 35/40 (Final Battle)
GameSpot	8/10
IGN	7/10
Nintendo Life	7/10
Nintendo World Report	6/10
PlayStation Official Magazine – UK	7/10

Attack on Titan 2 sold 28,480 copies on PlayStation 4 within its first week on sale in Japan, which placed it at number three on the all format sales chart. The Nintendo Switch version sold 22,941 in the same week, whilst the PlayStation Vita version sold 15,621 copies.

The game was nominated for "Sound Editing in a Game Cinema" at the National Academy of Video Game Trade Reviewers Awards.
