= Gekijōban Meiji Tokyo Renka: Hana Kagami no Fantasia =

2016 film by Hiroshi Watanabe

- Cover of the regular edition DVD
- 劇場版 明治東亰恋伽～花鏡の幻想曲～
- Directed by: Hiroshi Watanabe
- Screenplay by: Yoshiko Nakamura
- Based on: Meiji Tokyo Renka by Mages
- Starring: Sumire Morohoshi; Nobuhiko Okamoto; Daisuke Namikawa; KENN; Kousuke Toriumi; Jun Fukuyama; Shinnosuke Tachibana; Toshiyuki Morikawa; Yoshimasa Hosoya
- Cinematography: Asahiko Koshiyama
- Edited by: Rie Matsubara
- Music by: Imagine Voice
- Production company: Studio Deen
- Distributed by: Movic
- Release date: May 6, 2016
- Running time: 60 minutes
- Country: Japan
- Language: Japanese

Gekijōban Meiji Tokyo Renka: Hana Kagami no Fantasia (劇場版 明治東亰恋伽 〜花鏡の幻想曲〜; "Meiji Tokyo Renka the Movie: Fantasia of the Flower Mirror") is a 2016 Japanese anime film directed by Hiroshi Watanabe and based on the visual novel Meiji Tokyo Renka by Mages. The film was screened at Shinjuku and Ikebukuro in Tokyo, Japan on May 6, 2016.

== Plot ==
As Mei Ayazuki and the others watch Otojiro Kawakami perform, Kyōka recalls meeting Tosuke and his mother during childhood. During the after-party, Tosuke shows Mei and Kyōka the shattered flower mirror, informing them that the shards she had freed have returned. He requests Mei to help him find the remaining pieces, hoping to restore the mirror in order to avenge his mother's death by killing the snake spirit living inside. Mei recalls seeing the mirror in her own time period, but she faints upon memory.

The next day, Kyoka visits Mei at Otojiro's ochaya and reveals that the mirror is connected to the spirit world. He gives her a rabbit-shaped bell out of concern for her leaving with Tosuke alone the night prior and, when he becomes drunk, reveals that he fears her leaving. Later, Yakumo Koizumi notifies Mei and Tosuke of an onmoraki, which he believes has possessed Goro Fujita. Despite Goro being safe, Mei and Tosuke see one in town. During their investigation, Tosuke, noticing Mei's rabbit-shaped bell, admits to Mei that, like Kyoka, he would never let her out of his sight, only to brush off his comment as a joke. At night, Mei spots Charlie in town and follows him to a shrine, where he informs her that she will be able to return to her time period the next week for the full moon. When she confides this to Kyoka, he becomes angry and avoids her. In the following days, Mei continues to help Tosuke, while Kyoka seeks advice from Ogai Mori and Shunso Hishida.

During Shunso's art exhibit, he becomes possessed by the onmoraki and draws a nue, and Otojiro knocks him out before he can jump out of the window. Tosuke defeats the onmoraki with his electric device, allowing Mei to take its shard. The mirror is restored, but, with Tosuke's electric device, it brings the nue into real life. When Tosuke takes Mei to the world inside the mirror, he confronts the snake spirit and attempts to shoot it despite her protests. Instead, Kyoka, who had followed them, is mortally wounded from the gunshot after sacrificing himself to save Mei.

Kyoka recognizes the snake spirit as Tosuke's mother, who he met as a child after his mother had died. The snake spirit confirms that she had impersonated Tosuke's mother after his real mother had died from illness and left when she could no longer maintain a human form. Kyoka also realizes that he and Mei had met when they were young, after she had seen him through the mirror. Before he dies, he tells Tosuke that he can still change and confesses to Mei that he loves her. Mei replies that she loves him as well and kisses him. The snake spirit sacrifices herself to revive Kyoka, and Tosuke makes peace with her. The three return from the mirror, with the town back to normal and the nue gone.

During the next full moon, Mei meets with Charlie, realizing that he had led her to the mirror when she was young and had introduced her to Kyoka. She thanks him for allowing her to meet new people, and he proceeds with his magic show. In a post-credits scene, Mei meets with Kyōka, revealing that she had chosen to stay in the Meiji period instead of going home.

== Cast ==
- Mei Ayazuki – Sumire Morohoshi
- Kyōka Izumi – Nobuhiko Okamoto
- Ōgai Mori – Daisuke Namikawa
- Shunsō Hishida – KENN
- Otojirō Kawakami – Kousuke Toriumi
- Gorō Fujita – Jun Fukuyama
- Yakumo Koizumi – Shinnosuke Tachibana
- Charlie – Toshiyuki Morikawa
- Tōsuke Iwasaki – Yoshimasa Hosoya

== Production ==
Gekijōban Meiji Tokyo Renka: Hana Kagami no Fantasia is part of the animated film project that Broccoli had announced on November 4, 2013. The film is animated by Studio Deen, with Hiroshi Watanabe directing under supervision from Yukiko Uozumi, the scenario writer for the original game. Additional staff members included Yoshiko Nakamura as the screenplay writer and Akio Hirakawa as the character designer. The voice cast reprised their roles from the game and the previous film. The plot is a continuation of the 2015 film Gekijōban Meiji Tokyo Renka: Yumihari no Serenade, which follows Kyōka Izumi's route from the original Meiji Tokyo Renka game, with new plot elements introduced through Tōsuke Iwasaki's character.

The theme song for the film is "Yakusoku" (約束; lit. "Promise"), performed by KENN, which was released as a single on September 4, 2016. Two versions of the single were released with alternate covers: one with a themed Meiji Tokyo Renka cover, and one with a "KENN style cover", which features himself. The single reached #41 on the Oricon Weekly Singles Chart.

== Release ==
Due to Serenade of the Crescent Moon's poor box office performance, Fantasia of the Flower Mirror was released through a one-day screening event on May 6, 2016, at Cinemart Shinjuku in Shinjuku and Cinema Sunshine in Ikebukuro, with Nobuhiko Okamoto, Kyoka's voice actor, appearing at the final screening. Afterwards, the film screened at Animate stores in the middle of May 2016. The film was later given a region 2 DVD home release on August 22, 2016, which peaked at #13 on the Oricon Weekly DVD Chart.
