= Gekijōban Meiji Tokyo Renka: Yumihari no Serenade =

- Theatrical release poster
- 明治東亰恋伽～弦月の小夜曲～
- Directed by: Hiroshi Watanabe
- Screenplay by: Yoshiko Nakamura
- Based on: Meiji Tokyo Renka by Mages
- Starring: Sumire Morohoshi; Nobuhiko Okamoto; Daisuke Namikawa; KENN; Kousuke Toriumi; Jun Fukuyama; Shinnosuke Tachibana; Toshiyuki Morikawa; Yoshimasa Hosoya
- Cinematography: Asahiko Koshiyama
- Edited by: Rie Matsubara
- Music by: Imagine Voice
- Production company: Studio Deen
- Distributed by: Movic
- Release date: July 18, 2015
- Running time: 60 minutes
- Country: Japan
- Language: Japanese

Gekijōban Meiji Tokyo Renka: Yumihari no Serenade (明治東亰恋伽～弦月の小夜曲～; Meiji Tokyo Renka the Movie: Serenade of the Crescent Moon) is a 2015 Japanese anime film directed by Hiroshi Watanabe and based on the visual novel Meiji Tokyo Renka by Mages. The film was released in nationwide Japanese theaters on July 18, 2015, in Japan.

The plot is centered on Mei Ayazuki, who is transported into the Meiji period and interacts with spirits and Japanese historical figures. The story is based on Kyōka Izumi's route, with the addition of Tōsuke Iwasaki, an original character, to introduce new elements to the plot. Despite failing to break in the top 15 on opening weekend, the film was praised for portraying the retro-styled elegance of the Meiji period as well as the relationship between Mei and Kyōka. The continuation of the story was featured in the sequel anime film, Gekijōban Meiji Tokyo Renka: Hana Kagami no Fantasia, which was released in theaters in 2016.

== Plot ==
On the night of the crimson moon, Charlie transports Mei Ayazuki into the Meiji period during a magic show. This causes a mirror to shatter, and after being sent back in time, Mei is taken in by Otojiro Kawakami. Some time later, Mei and Kyōka Izumi look for Otojiro's hair pin, which has been stolen by a black cat spirit. While chasing it, Mei nearly gets run over by Tōsuke Iwasaki's car. As Kyōka recalls having met Tōsuke in his childhood, Tōsuke insists on compensating Mei's injury, to which she requests ¥1,000 to get a ride back. Once she realizes ¥1,000 is worth a fortune in the Meiji period, Otojiro suggests returning it to him.

At a party, Ogai Mori, Otojiro, and Yakumo Koizumi decide to hold a beauty contest for the chance to dance with Mei. Meanwhile, Mei becomes reacquainted with Tōsuke, and the next day, she and Kyōka visit him to return the money. Tōsuke introduces an electric light bulb, but his mansion is attacked by kamaitachi, destroying the light bulbs. Mei finds a shard left behind, which disappears when she touches it. Tōsuke is confident that electricity will drive away all spirits, leading Mei to believe that he had an unfavorable experience with them.

While Mei and Kyōka investigate, Yakumo suggests the black cat was from Shunso's painting. After visiting Ogai and Shunso, that night, the black cat leads Mei and Kyōka to a dog spirit with a shard similar to the one found in Tōsuke's mansion in its leg, and Mei frees him. When Ogai's colleague hears that the black cat has returned to Shunso's painting following the incident, he asks Mei to find a pocket watch that was stolen by a crow spirit. Kyōka refuses to help her, preoccupied with containing Shirayuki, a dragon spirit materialized in real life from his writings. Left to search alone, Mei is approached by Charlie, who reports that she will be able to return to her own time period during the next full moon. Charlie gives her the pocket watch, and when she attempts to return it to Ogai's colleague, his guard mistakes her for a thief and she is arrested. After Kyōka takes her home from jail, Mei, troubled by Charlie's revelation, confesses to him that she is from the future. Kyōka immediately accepts it, and the two become closer.

Tōsuke displays his electric light bulb exhibit to the townspeople, but they are attacked by kamaitachi. While Kyōka confronts Tōsuke about being able to see spirits and trying to rid the world of them, Shirayuki appears, causing him to go to the lake to console her. After Kyōka convinces her to return, Mei, who has followed them, frees her from a shard caught in her throat. Shirayuki returns to Kyōka's writings, leaving the town in peace. At the party, Tosuke wins the beauty contest, but since he is not present, his win is forfeited, and Mei's suitors dance with her instead.

In a post-credits scene, Tōsuke looks over the shattered mirror, which has recovered the shards freed by Mei.

== Cast ==
- Mei Ayazuki - Sumire Morohoshi
- Kyōka Izumi - Nobuhiko Okamoto
- Ōgai Mori - Daisuke Namikawa
- Shunsō Hishida - KENN
- Otojirō Kawakami - Kousuke Toriumi
- Gorō Fujita - Jun Fukuyama
- Yakumo Koizumi - Shinnosuke Tachibana
- Charlie - Toshiyuki Morikawa
- Tōsuke Iwasaki - Yoshimasa Hosoya

== Production ==
Broccoli announced that an animated film had been green-lit at an event on November 4, 2013. In 2015, Studio Deen announced that they would be animating the film, and the film would be directed by Hiroshi Watanabe under supervision from Yukiko Uozumi, the scenario writer for the original game. Additional staff members included Yoshiko Nakamura as the screenplay writer and Akio Hirakawa as the character designer. The voice cast reprised their roles from the game. Sumire Morohoshi was cast as Mei Ayazuki, who was unvoiced in the games, and Yoshimasa Hosoya was cast as Tosuke Iwasaki, a new, original character made for the film. The plot of the film mainly focuses on Kyōka Izumi's route from the original Meiji Tokyo Renka game, with additional plot elements introduced through Tosuke Iwasaki's character.

KENN, the voice actor for Shunsō, announced on his Twitter account that he would be performing the film's theme song, "Dance in the Light." The song was released as a single on August 31, 2015, in two different versions: one with a themed Meiji Tokyo Renka cover, and a "KENN style cover", which features himself. The song peaked at #86 on the Oricon Weekly Singles Chart.

Yumihari no Serenade was released in nationwide theaters in Japan on July 18, 2015. It was later given a region 2 DVD home release on April 26, 2016, which peaked at #18 on the Oricon Weekly DVD Chart. The film was followed up with a continuation, Gekijōban Meiji Tokyo Renka: Hana Kagami no Fantasia, which was given a one-day screening event on May 6, 2016.

== Reception ==
Meiji Tokyo Renka: Yumihari no Serenade failed to chart in the top 16 on opening weekend.

Cinema Today cited the highlights of the film as being the "attention to the retro and elegant worldview unique to the Meiji era", as well as the relationship between Mei and Kyōka. Masaki Endo from Mantan Web praised the addition of Tosuke Iwasaki into the story and believes that fans who have played the original game will enjoy the film; he also complimented the "retro" setting for "bringing back a sense to when times were elegant."

== Sequel ==
A sequel anime film titled Gekijōban Meiji Tokyo Renka: Hana Kagami no Fantasia was screened on May 6, 2016, at Cinemart Shinjuku in Shinjuku and Cinema Sunshine in Ikebukuro.
