= Genie Family 2020 =

2020 Japanese anime television series

- Key visual for the series, featuring Hakushon Daimaō
- ハクション大魔王2020
- Created by: Tatsunoko Production
- Based on: The Genie Family
- Developed by: Hiroko Kanasugi
- Directed by: Atsushi Nigorikawa
- Voices of: Sumire Morohoshi; Koichi Yamadera; Miyuri Shimabukuro; Daiki Yamashita
- Music by: Takamitsu Shimazaki; Hiroshi Sasaki; Teppei Shimizu
- Opening theme: "Satesu Hakushon" by Tamio Okuda
- Ending theme: "Akubi o Sureba" (Note: episodes 1–10) by Friends; "Fure Fure" (Note: episodes 11–20) by Shoko Nakagawa
- Country of origin: Japan
- Original language: Japanese
- No. of episodes: 20

Production
- Producer: Toshiyuki Watanabe
- Animators: Tatsunoko Production; Nippon Animation
- Production companies: ytv; Tatsunoko Production

Original release
- Network: NNS (ytv, Nippon TV)
- Release: April 11 – September 26, 2020

Related
- The Genie Family

Genie Family 2020 (Japanese: ハクション大魔王2020, romanized: Hakushon Daimaō 2020) is a 2020 Japanese anime television series co-produced by Yomiuri TV and Tatsunoko Production, serving as a sequel to Tatsunoko's 1969 television series The Genie Family made in commemoration of its 50th anniversary. The series aired on Yomiuri TV, Nippon Television and their affiliates from April 11 to September 26, 2020.

== Cast ==
Character	Voice actor
Akubi	Sumire Morohoshi
Hakushon Daimaō	Koichi Yamadera
Kantaro Yodayama	Miyuri Shimabukuro
Puuta	Daiki Yamashita
Takashi Yodayama	Kyotaro Muramoto
Yoko Yodayama	Noriko Hidaka
Kanichi Yodayama	Toshio Furukawa
Mario Kenmami	Haruka Tomatsu
Yumizu Kinamari	Tomokazu Seki
Sorekara Ojisan	Chō

== Production and release ==
The series was announced on January 1, 2020 (New Year's Day). The series was directed by Atsushi Nigorikawa with series composition by Hiroko Kanasugi, original character designs by Suzuka Yoshida, animation character designs and chief animation direction by Shin Takemoto and Masatune Noguchi with music by Takamitsu Shimazaki, Hiroshi Sasaki and Teppei Shimizu. Tatsunoko and Nippon Animation both handle animation production.

The series' opening theme is titled "Satesu Hakushon", performed by Tamio Okuda. For the first half, the ending theme is titled "Akubi o Sureba", performed by Friends while the second half features "Fure Fure" by Shoko Nakagawa.

Production was suspended due to the COVID-19 pandemic in Japan with episode 8 being delayed from its original airdate on May 30 to June 20 of that year.

Viz Media licensed the series in North America and Latin America, while Crunchyroll streamed the series in those territories.
