= Sumire Morohoshi =

Japanese voice actress and singer

- 諸星 すみれ
- Born: April 23, 1999 (age 27); Ōi, Ashigarakami District, Kanagawa, Japan
- Occupations: Actress; voice actress; singer
- Years active: 2002–present
- Agent: Himawari Theatre Group
- Height: 151 cm (4 ft 11 in)

Sumire Morohoshi (諸星 すみれ, Morohoshi Sumire; born April 23, 1999) is a Japanese actress, voice actress, and singer from Kanagawa Prefecture. She debuted as a solo singer under the Flying Dog record label.

== Biography ==
Sumire Morohoshi was born in Kanagawa Prefecture, Japan, on April 23, 1999. At the time of birth, the right side of her body was paralysed, but the paralysis was cured within a few months.

Morohoshi joined the Himawari Theatre Group at the age of three, inspired by her admiration for characters in Spirited Away. In 2006, at the age of seven, she voiced Carrie in the anime series Red Garden and was shocked by the vocal performance of co-star Takehito Koyasu. At the age of nine, she voiced Nina Tucker in Fullmetal Alchemist: Brotherhood, in which her "skillful" performance encouraged the staff to cast her as Betty in Heroman.

Since 2009, she has been active as a voice actor, in addition to performing in television dramas and on stage. In 2012, she voiced her first leading role as Ichigo Hoshimiya in Aikatsu!. In 2019, she made her debut in record label FlyingDog's track "Pure White," which was used for the opening theme to Ascendance of a Bookworm, and released as part of her debut album Smile. The second season featured Morohoshi's first solo single, "Tsumujikaze."

On July 14, 2022, Morohoshi tested positive for COVID-19.

== Filmography ==
=== Television animation ===
Year	Title	Role	Other notes
2006	Red Garden	Carrie Sheedy	
2009	Corpse Princess: Kuro	Toya	
2009	Fullmetal Alchemist: Brotherhood	Nina Tucker	
2010	Maid Sama!	Misaki Ayuzawa (young)	
2010	Princess Jellyfish	Clara	
2010	Heroman	Betty	
2010	Rainbow: Nisha Rokubō no Shichinin	Hana	
2011	Blue Exorcist	Yui Sakamoto	
2011	No. 6	Lili	
2011	Stitch!	Lilo Pelekai (young), Lilo's daughter	
2012	Aikatsu!	Ichigo Hoshimiya	
2012	The Ambition of Oda Nobuna	Himiko	
2012	Beyblade: Shogun Steel	Maru	
2012	OniAi	Arisa Takanomiya	
2012	Yu-Gi-Oh! Zexal	Pip/Dog	
2013	Gaist Crusher	Theresa	
2013	GJ Club	Seira Amatsuka	
2013	My Teen Romantic Comedy SNAFU	Rumi Tsurumi	
2014	Tokyo Ghoul	Hinami Fueguchi	
2014	When Supernatural Battles Became Commonplace	Maiya Takanashi	
2015	Jewelpet: Magical Change	Sumire	
2015	Fafner in the Azure: -EXODUS-	Miwa Hino	
2015	Haikyū!! 2	Hitoka Yachi	
2015	Tokyo Ghoul √A	Hinami Fueguchi	
2015	My Teen Romantic Comedy SNAFU TOO	Rumi Tsurumi	
2015	PriPara	Usacha	
2016	Bungo Stray Dogs	Kyōka Izumi	
2016	Haikyū!! Karasuno High School vs Shiratorizawa Academy	Hitoka Yachi	
2016	Fairy Tail Zero	Miko	
2016	Aikatsu Stars!	Tsubasa Kisaragi, Ichigo Hoshimiya	
2016	Fate/kaleid liner Prisma Illya 3rei!	Erica Ainsworth	
2017	Hand Shakers	Koyori Akutagawa	
2017	Rage of Bahamut: Virgin Soul	Nina Drango	
2017	Little Witch Academia	Annabel Crème	
2017	Gabriel DropOut	Haniel	
2017	Welcome to the Ballroom	Mako Akagi	
2017	Restaurant to Another World	Shia Gold	
2017	Inuyashiki	Shion Watanabe	
2018	Aikatsu Friends!	Coco	
2018	Pop Team Epic	Popuko, Heroine (live-action portrayal)	S1 Ep. 8a, S1 Remix Ep. 2a, S2 Ep. 1
2018	The Ancient Magus' Bride	Stella Barklem	
2018	Pocket Monsters: Sun & Moon	Acerola	
2018	Violet Evergarden	Ann Magnolia	Ep. 10
2018	Mr. Osomatsu	Okiku	Ep. 43
2019	Meiji Tokyo Renka	Mei Ayazuki	
2019	The Promised Neverland	Emma	
2019	Bungo Stray Dogs 3	Kyōka Izumi	
2019	Ultraman	Rena Sayama	
2019	Aikatsu on Parade!	Ichigo Hoshimiya, Tsubasa Kisaragi, Coco	
2019	Beyblade Burst GT	Gwyn Ronny	
2020	Haikyū!! To The Top	Hitoka Yachi	
2020	Magia Record: Puella Magi Madoka Magica Side Story	Nemu Hiiragi	
2020	BNA: Brand New Animal	Michiru Kagemori	
2020	Genie Family 2020	Akubi	
2021	The Promised Neverland 2nd Season	Emma	
2021	Aikatsu Planet!	Bright Sapphire	
2021	Bungo Stray Dogs Wan!	Kyōka Izumi	
2021	Hetalia: World Stars	Czech Republic	
2021	Battle Athletes Victory ReSTART!	Kanata Akehoshi	
2021	Megaton Musashi	Jun Kirishima	
2021	Lupin the 3rd Part 6	Lily	
2023	Bungo Stray Dogs 4	Kyōka Izumi	
2023	Insomniacs After School	Mina Nono	
2023	Fate/strange Fake: Whispers of Dawn	Tiné Chelc	
2023	Mushoku Tensei: Jobless Reincarnation 2	Julie	
2023	Migi & Dali	Metry	
2024	A Sign of Affection	Yuki Itose	
2024	VTuber Legend: How I Went Viral After Forgetting to Turn Off My Stream	Shion Kaminari	
2024	Too Many Losing Heroines!	Tiara Basori	
2024	Fate/strange Fake	Tiné Chelc	
2025	Apocalypse Hotel	Ponko	
2025	Grand Blue Dreaming Season 2	Shiori Kitahara	
2025	Let's Play	Lucy Wright	
2026	Journal with Witch	Emiri Nara	
2026	Playing Death Games to Put Food on the Table	Riko	
2026	Even a Replica Can Fall in Love	Sunao Aikawa, Nao	
2026	Pardon the Intrusion, I'm Home!	Mao Usada	
2026	Bungo Stray Dogs Wan! 2	Kyōka Izumi	
2026	The Forsaken Saintess and Her Foodie Roadtrip in Another World	Aria	
2026	Grand Blue Dreaming Season 3	Shiori Kitahara	
2026	Sgt. Frog☆	Momoka Nishizawa	
2026	As a Reincarnated Aristocrat, I'll Use My Appraisal Skill to Rise in the World	Musha Trick	S3
2027	Multi-Mind Mayhem	Silke	
2027	A Pen, Handcuffs, and a Common-Law Marriage	Hinade Haruyama	
2027	Kindergarten Wars	Una	

=== Original video animation ===
Year	Title	Role	Other notes
2012	Code Geass: Akito the Exiled	Leila Malcal (young)	

=== Theatrical animation ===
Year	Title	Role	Other notes	Reference
2009	Final Fantasy VII: Advent Children	Marlene Wallace	Complete Edition	
2009	Professor Layton and the Eternal Diva	Nina		
2009	Summer Wars	Mao Jinnouchi		
2010	Fafner: Dead Agressor: Heaven and Earth	Miwa Hino		
2010	Hutch the Honeybee	Blanca		
2011	The Princess and the Pilot	Fana del Moral (young)		
2011	Friends: Mononoke Shima no Naki	Kiku		
2013	Majocco Shimai no Yoyo to Nene	Yoyo		
2013	Pokémon Best Wishes! The Movie: Extreme Speed Genesect! Mewtwo Awakens!	Water Genesect		
2014	Aikatsu! The Movie	Ichigo Hoshimiya		
2014	Saint Seiya: Legend of Sanctuary	Saori Kido (young)		
2015	The Boy and the Beast	Chiko		
2015	Meiji Tokyo Renka the Movie: Serenade of the Crescent Moon	Mei Ayazuki		
2015	Psycho-Pass: The Movie	Yeo		
2016	Aikatsu Stars! The Movie	Tsubasa Kisaragi		
2016	Meiji Tokyo Renka the Movie: Fantasia of the Flower Mirror	Mei Ayazuki		
2016	Kaze no Matasaburō	Kasuke		
2018	Bungo Stray Dogs: Dead Apple	Kyōka Izumi		
2020	Violet Evergarden: The Movie	Daisy Magnolia		
2021	Pretty Guardian Sailor Moon Eternal The Movie	PallaPalla / Sailor Pallas	2-Part Film, Season 4 of Sailor Moon Crystal (Dead Moon arc)	
2021	Words Bubble Up Like Soda Pop	Marie		
2021	Fate/kaleid liner Prisma Illya: Licht – The Nameless Girl	Erica Ainsworth		
2021	Eureka – Eureka Seven: Hi-Evolution	La La Land		
2023	Hokkyoku Hyakkaten no Concierge-san	Cat		
2023	Pretty Guardian Sailor Moon Cosmos The Movie	Sailor Pallas	2-Part Film, Season 5 of Sailor Moon Crystal (Shadow Galactica arc)	
2024	Haikyu!! The Dumpster Battle	Hitoka Yachi		
2026	Made in Abyss: Mezameru Shinpi	Tepaste		

=== Web Anime ===
Year	Title	Role	Reference
2024	Negative Happy	Manaka/Manaka Tomonaga	

=== Video games ===
Year	Title	Role	System	Other notes
2010	Kingdom Hearts Birth by Sleep	Kairi (young)	PlayStation Portable	
2011	Final Fantasy Type-0	Moogle	PlayStation Portable	
2011	Final Fantasy XIII-2	Moogle	PlayStation 3, Xbox 360, Microsoft Windows, iOS, Android	
2013	Lightning Returns: Final Fantasy XIII	Moogle	PlayStation 3, Xbox 360, Microsoft Windows, iOS, Android	
2014	Granblue Fantasy	Lilele	iOS, Android	
2015	Tokyo Mirage Sessions ♯FE	Tiki	Wii U	
2017	Resident Evil 7: Biohazard	Eveline (Young)	Microsoft Windows, PlayStation 4, Xbox One	
2017	Fire Emblem Heroes	Tiki (Young)	iOS, Android	
2017	Fire Emblem Warriors	Tiki	Nintendo Switch, New Nintendo 3DS	
2018	Dragalia Lost	Laranoa, Tiki	iOS, Android	
2019	Magia Record	Nemu Hiiragi	iOS, Android	
2019	Girls' Frontline	P90, M870	iOS, Android	
2021	Rune Factory 5	Ludmilla	Nintendo Switch	
2021	The Caligula Effect 2	Sasara Amiki	PlayStation 4, Nintendo Switch	
2022	River City Girls 2	Kyōko	PlayStation 4, PlayStation 5, Xbox One, Xbox Series X/S, Nintendo Switch, Microsoft Windows	
2022	Goddess of Victory: Nikke	Yuni	iOS, Android	
2023	Atelier Ryza 3: Alchemist of the End & the Secret Key	Federica Lamberti	PlayStation 4, PlayStation 5, Nintendo Switch, Microsoft Windows	
2023	Honkai: Star Rail	Pela (Pelageya Sergeyevna)	iOS, Android, PlayStation 4, PlayStation 5, Microsoft Windows	
2024	Metaphor: ReFantazio	Gallica	PlayStation 5, Xbox Series X/S, Microsoft Windows	
2025	Fate/Grand Order	Lilith	iOS, Android	

=== Dubbing ===
==== Live-action ====
- 2012, Lilly Curtis (Morgan Lily)
- 65, Koa (Ariana Greenblatt)
- Bedtime Stories, Bobbi Bronson (Laura Ann Kesling)
- Brothers, Isabelle Cahill (Bailee Madison)
- The Curious Case of Benjamin Button, Daisy Fuller (age 7) (Elle Fanning)
- Dark Shadows, Victoria Winters (young) (Alexia Osborne)
- The Fall, Alexandria (Catinca Untaru)
- Harper's Island, Abby Mills (young (Ava Hughes))
- Harry Potter and the Deathly Hallows – Part 2, Petunia Dursley (young (Ariella Paradise))
- Inception (theatrical version), Phillipa Cobb (age 5 (Taylor Geare))
- Interstellar, Murphy "Murph" Cooper (young) (Mackenzie Foy)
- The Mustang, Martha Coleman (Gideon Adlon)
- Nanny McPhee, Agatha "Aggie" Brown (Hebe Barnes, Zinnia Barnes)
- Old Dogs, Emily Greer (Ella Bleu Travolta)
- Percy Jackson: Sea of Monsters, Thalia Grace (young) (Katelyn Mager)
- The Sound of Music (2011 TV Tokyo edition), Marta von Trapp (Debbie Turner)
- Spider-Man 3, Penny Marko (Perla Haney-Jardine))
- Spy Kids: All the Time in the World, Rebecca Wilson (Rowan Blanchard)
- Transformers, Little Girl (Sophie Bobal)
- War, Ana Chang (Kennedy Lauren Montano)
- Without a Trace, Samantha Spade (young (Aspen Payge))
- Bakuage Sentai Boonboomger (Yaiyai Yarucar)

==== Animation ====
- Adventure Time: Distant Lands, Y5
- Bambi II, Thumper's Sister
- A Christmas Carol, Belle
- The Croods, Sandy Crood
- Frozen, Anna (age 9)
- Hawaiian Vacation, Bonnie Anderson
- Legend of the Guardians: The Owls of Ga'Hoole, Eglantine
- Leroy & Stitch, Lilo Pelekai
- Monster House, Eliza
- Partysaurus Rex, Bonnie Anderson, Cuddles the Alligator
- The Princess and the Frog, Charlotte "Lottie" La Bouff (young)
- Secrets of the Furious Five, Nerdy Bunny
- Small Fry, Bonnie Anderson
- Surf's Up, Kate
- Tangled, Rapunzel (young)
- Toy Story 3, Bonnie Anderson
- Toy Story of Terror!, Bonnie Anderson
- Wreck-It Ralph, Vanellope von Schweetz
- Ralph Breaks the Internet, Vanellope von Schweetz

== Discography ==
Year	Title	Type	Notes
2019	Smile	Album	Includes Ascendance of a Bookworm opening theme
2020	Tsumujikaze	Single	Includes Ascendance of a Bookworm season 2 opening theme and a cover of "Etude of Radiance"
2023	Kanaeru	Single	Includes Sugar Apple Fairy Tale opening theme
