= Last Game =

Manga series by Shinobu Amano

- Cover of the first volume

ラストゲーム (Rasuto Gēmu)
- Genre: Comedy-drama; Romantic comedy; Slice of life
- Manga
- Written by: Shinobu Amano
- Published by: Hakusensha
- English publisher: NA: Seven Seas Entertainment
- Imprint: Hana to Yume Comics
- Magazine: LaLa
- Original run: July 24, 2011 – June 24, 2016
- Volumes: 11

Last Game (Japanese: ラストゲーム, Hepburn: Rasuto Gēmu) is a Japanese manga series written and illustrated by Shinobu Amano. It was serialized in Hakusensha's shōjo manga magazine LaLa from July 2011 to June 2016. The series follows Naoto Yanagi and Mikoto Kujō from the time they meet in elementary school until their second year in college, where most of the series takes place.

== Plot ==
Born into a wealthy family with high social status, Naoto Yanagi is not only rich and spoilt, but also intelligent, gentlemanly, handsome, and has never lost to anyone before, until Mikoto Kūjo transfers into his class. The two are complete opposites as Mikoto is poor and very practical, having near to no knowledge about emotions. They develop a one-sided rivalry where Naoto battles against her in all areas but always suffers defeat, much to his chagrin. Vowing to win against her at least once, he follows Mikoto through middle school, high school, and finally to college, where he requests a "Last Game" against her to decide which of them is better. Remembering how all the girls in his schools fawned over him, Naoto is determined to do the same with Mikoto and then break her heart mercilessly. However, with all his efforts and Mikoto's bluntness and ignorance of human emotions, Naoto unexpectedly finds himself falling in love with her! The story follows their relationship as it progresses, the introduction of events that place their relationship in jeopardy, and each of their own growth as a person.

== Characters ==
Naoto Yanagi (柳 尚人, Yanagi Naoto)
Voiced by: Ryōhei Kimura (drama CD)
Naoto comes from a rich family, so he is used to getting what he wants and excels in every area, be it sports or grades. He meets Mikoto in elementary school when she transfers and hates her at first because she is his competition for the top of the class. Due to his family background, he is arrogant and spoilt, although he doesn't show that in front of the girls in his class. Although he originally hates Mikoto, he begins to care about her and eventually falls in love with her. In college, he joins the Astronomy Club with Mikoto. At the end of the manga, he marries Mikoto after the time skip.
Mikoto Kujō (九条 美琴, Kujō Mikoto)
Voiced by: Yoko Hikasa (drama CD)
Mikoto comes from a poor family, mainly due to the fact that her father died when she was young and they have to depend solely on her mother. She likes to study and is relatively quiet and keeps to herself. She has a hard time understanding her own feelings and is therefore initially confused when she begins to realize she likes Yanagi. In college, she is a member of the Astronomy Club. At the end of the manga, she marries Naoto and changes her last name to Yanagi which became 'Yanagi Mikoto'.
Kei Sōma (相馬 蛍, Sōma Kei)
Voiced by: Shinnosuke Tachibana (drama CD)
Kei is a member of the Astronomy Club with Yanagi and Mikoto. He is often jealous of Yanagi and wishes to be more popular than him. He tries to claim Mikoto to make Yanagi jealous, but then honestly falls in love with her. He is from the country and tries to hide it. He decided to go to college in Tokyo to escape a broken heart. At the end of the manga, he works at an elite company but is still having trouble getting a girlfriend.
Shiori Fujimoto (藤本 しおり, Fujimoto Shiori)
Voiced by: Ayane Sakura (drama CD)
Mikoto's closest friend. She is cheerful and outgoing and often teases Mikoto. Shiori is the one who convinces Mikoto to join the Astronomy Club after they meet in a lecture. She is dating the president of the Astronomy club.
Momoka Tachibana (橘 桃香, Tachibana Momoka)
Voiced by: Ai Kakuma (drama CD)
A student at the same college as Yanagi's older sister. She has a crush on Yanagi. She was fat in elementary school and was bullied because of it, so she eventually decided to completely change her looks. At the end of the manga, she became a popular announcer.

== Publication ==
Last Game, written and illustrated by Shinobu Amano, was serialized in Hakusensha's shōjo manga magazine LaLa from July 24, 2011, to June 24, 2016. Eleven volumes have been published from January 4, 2012, to October 5, 2016. A special chapter was published in the first volume of Amano's next work Reverse X Rebirth on February 5, 2020. In October 2022, Seven Seas Entertainment announced that it licensed the manga for English publication.

=== Volumes ===
No.	Original release date	Original ISBN	English release date	English ISBN
1	January 4, 2012	978-4-59-219343-2	May 16, 2023	978-1-68579-907-6
2	July 5, 2012	978-4-59-219344-9	August 8, 2023	978-1-68579-916-8
3	January 4, 2013	978-4-59-219345-6	November 21, 2023	978-1-68579-943-4
4	July 5, 2013	978-4-59-219511-5	February 27, 2024	979-8-88843-362-1
5	January 4, 2014	978-4-59-219512-2	June 4, 2024	979-8-88843-475-8
6	July 4, 2014	978-4-59-219513-9	September 10, 2024	979-8-89160-245-8
7	January 5, 2015	978-4-59-219514-6	December 3, 2024	979-8-89160-246-5
8	June 5, 2015	978-4-59-219515-3; 978-4-59-210560-2 (SE)	March 18, 2025	979-8-89160-904-4
9	December 4, 2015	978-4-59-221058-0	June 17, 2025	979-8-89160-985-3
10	June 3, 2016	978-4-59-221059-7	September 16, 2025	979-8-89373-655-7
11	October 5, 2016	978-4-59-221060-3; 978-4-59-210566-4 (SE)	December 2, 2025	979-8-89373-656-4

== Reception ==
Last Game was ranked sixth on Takarajimasha's Kono Manga ga Sugoi! 2013 list of top manga for female readers.

== See also ==
- Reverse X Rebirth — Another manga series by the same author.
