= Shuto Miyazaki =

Japanese actor (born 1990)

- 宮崎 秋人
- Born: September 3, 1990 (age 35); Tokyo, Japan
- Occupation: Actor
- Years active: 2011–present
- Agent: Watanabe Entertainment
- Notable work: Yowamushi Pedal; Hakuoki
- Spouse: Saori Seto (m. 2025)
- Relatives: Koji Seto (brother-in-law)

Shuto Miyazaki (宮崎 秋人, Miyazaki Shūto; born September 3, 1990) is a Japanese actor represented by Watanabe Entertainment.

== Personal life ==
On December 15, 2025, Miyazaki announced his marriage to actress Saori Seto. The couple announced the news on their respective Instagram accounts.

== Filmography ==
=== Stage Play ===
- Musical "Hakuoki", Nagakura Shinpachi
  - Todo Heisuke version (2015)
- Stage play "Yowamushi Pedal", Shinkai Hayato
  - Inter High Chapter: The Second Order (2014)
  - Hakone Academy Chapter ~The Beast's Awakening~ The Beast on the Road (2014)
  - Inter High Chapter: The Winner (2015)
  - Hakone Academy New Generation, Start (2016)
- Stage play "Tokyo Ghoul" (2015), Nagachika Hideyoshi
- Stage play "Fairy Tail" (2016), Natsu Dragneel
  - Kyoto Crimson Chapter (2016)
  - Illuminati Chapter (2017)
- Dansui! (2017), Shinozuka Daiki

=== Movies ===
- Meiji Tokyo Renka (2019), Mori Ogai
- Two Outs Bases Loaded (2022)

=== Television ===
- Yowamushi Pedal - Season 1 (2016), Shinkai Hayato
- Dansui! (2017), Shinozuka Daiki
- Song of the Samurai (2026), Tōdō Heisuke
