= Meiji Tokyo Renka =

Japanese visual novel, game, and anime series

- Anime key visual

明治東亰恋伽 (Meiji Tōkyō Renka)
- Genre: Reverse harem
- Light novel
- Written by: Yukiko Uozumi
- Illustrated by: Karu
- Published by: Kadokawa Shoten
- Imprint: Kadokawa Beans Bunko
- Original run: June 30, 2012 – March 30, 2013
- Volumes: 2
- Video game
- Developer: Broccoli
- Publisher: Broccoli
- Genre: Visual novel
- Platform: PlayStation Portable
- Released: JP: September 26, 2013; WW: October 3, 2024
- Video game

Meiji Tokyo Renka: Twilight Kiss (明治東亰恋伽 トワヰライト・キス)
- Developer: Broccoli
- Publisher: Broccoli
- Genre: Visual novel
- Platform: PlayStation Portable
- Released: JP: April 23, 2015; WW: 2026
- Video game

Meiji Tokyo Renka: Full Moon (明治東亰恋伽 Full Moon)
- Developer: Mages
- Publisher: Mages
- Genre: Visual novel
- Platform: PlayStation Vita iOS; Android
- Released: JP: August 25, 2016; (PlayStation Vita): JP: July 20, 2017; (iOs & Android)
- Video game

Meiji Tokyo Renka: Haikara Date (明治東亰恋伽～ハヰカラデヱト～)
- Developer: Mages, Love & Art
- Publisher: Mages., Love & Art
- Genre: Visual novel
- Platform: iOs, Android
- Released: JP: December 14, 2018
- Anime television series
- Directed by: Akitaro Daichi
- Written by: Yukiko Uozumi; Haruka; Motoko Takahashi
- Music by: Shiki
- Studio: TMS/V1 Studio
- Licensed by: NA: Crunchyroll
- Original network: Tokyo MX, TV Aichi
- Original run: January 9, 2019 – March 27, 2019
- Episodes: 12
- See also
- Gekijōban Meiji Tokyo Renka: Yumihari no Serenade; Gekijōban Meiji Tokyo Renka: Hana Kagami no Fantasia
- icon

Meiji Tokyo Renka (Japanese: 明治東亰恋伽, Hepburn: Meiji Tōkyō Renka; lit. "Meiji Tokyo Love Song") is a Japanese visual novel series produced by Mages, with character design and art provided by Karu. The series follows Mei Ayazuki, a high school girl who is sent back in time to the Meiji period and explores her relationships with spirits and Japanese historical figures.

Meiji Tokyo Renka was released as a mobile game by Dwango in 2011, with over 300,000 users playing the game. In 2013, it was ported onto the PlayStation Portable by Broccoli, and was then followed by game sequels and updated re-releases.

The original game franchise also expanded with a series of adaptations, including two theatrical animated films, musical theatre adaptations, an animated television series, and a live-action film.

== Plot ==
On the night of the crimson moon, high school student Mei Ayazuki comes across a traveling magician, Charlie, and is transported back in time to the Meiji period, where she meets several historical figures and is invited to live with them. Though Mei has lost her memories, she begins helping the men with their own concerns through her ability to see and interact with spirits. While waiting for the next full moon, Mei comes to consider staying in the Meiji period altogether.

== Characters ==
Mei Ayazuki (綾月芽衣, Ayazuki Mei)
Voiced by: Sumire Morohoshi (anime) (Japanese); Madeleine Morris (English)
Portrayed by: Shion Aoki (Oborozuki no Chat Noir musical), Momoko Suzuki (Gekkō no Meine Liebe musical), Rikka Ihara (live-action film)
Mei is a high school student who is transported into the Meiji period and loses her memories. She has the ability to see spirits. Her name can be changed by the player in the games.
Ogai Mori (森鴎外, Mori Ōgai)
Voiced by: Daisuke Namikawa (anime & games) (Japanese); Christopher Wekhamp (English)
Portrayed by: Hirofumi Araki (musical), Shuto Miyazaki (live-action film)
Ogai is a translator and writer who also works as a doctor for the military. After meeting Mei, he has her to pretend to be his fiancé to avoid suspicion. Later on, he asks her to pose as his fiancée and invites her to live in his house. Throughout his route, Ogai faces a spirit named Elise, a character he created based on a girl he admired while he was in Germany.
Shunso Hishida (菱田春草, Hishida Shunsō)
Voiced by: KENN (anime & games) (Japanese); Daman Mills (English)
Portrayed by: Shohei Hashimoto (musical), Makaha Takahashi (live-action film)
Shunso is an artist living with Ogai and is known for his unique art style. He acts exasperated towards Ogai and Mei, but secretly admires them. He is fascinated with cats, but falls into a slump after a black cat from one of his paintings escapes into the real world. Shunso also has problems with his vision and avoids getting examined out of fear that it may lead to the end of his career.
Otojirō Kawakami (川上音二郎, Kawakami Otojirō)
Voiced by: Kōsuke Toriumi (anime & games) (Japanese); Aaron Roberts (English)
Portrayed by: Kousuke Asuma (musical), Taiki Yamazaki (live-action film)
Otojirō is an actor who works as a cross-dressing geisha under the name Otoyakko. He invites Mei to train as a geisha at his okiya. He enjoys the plays that Kyōka writes and uses them for his performances.
Kyōka Izumi (泉鏡花, Izumi Kyōka)
Voiced by: Nobuhiko Okamoto (anime & games) (Japanese); Aaron Dismuke (English)
Portrayed by: Tomoru Akazawa (musical), Toman (live-action film)
Kyōka is a playwright. He is mysophobic and hates dogs. Like Mei, he can also see spirits, including the rabbit on his shoulder, a memento from his deceased mother.
Gorō Fujita (藤田五郎, Fujita Gorō)
Voiced by: Jun Fukuyama (anime & games) (Japanese); Chad Halbrook (English)
Portrayed by: Yu Yoshioka (musical), Yuki Kubota (live-action film)
Gorō is a policeman and a former member of the Shinsengumi. The reflection of his katana allows him to see spirits, which he fights to preserve peace in the village.
Yakumo Koizumi (小泉八雲, Koizumi Yakumo)
Voiced by: Shinnosuke Tachibana (anime & games) (Japanese); Howard Wang (English)
Portrayed by: Ire Shiozaki (musical), Tetsuya Iwanaga (live-action film)
Yakumo is a researcher from Greece who came to Japan to teach English and do research on Japanese spirits.
Charlie (チャーリー, Chārī)
Voiced by: Toshiyuki Morikawa (anime & games) (Japanese); Ian Sinclair (English)
Portrayed by: Yūya Asato (musical), Yutaka Kobayashi (live-action film)
Charlie is a traveling magician who transports Mei into the Meiji period. His real identity is Tenichi Shokyokusai (松旭斎 天一, Shōkyokusai Tenichi). He can only appear at nighttime.
Tōsuke Iwasaki (岩崎 桃介, Iwasaki Tōsuke)
Voiced by: Yoshimasa Hosoya (anime & games) (Japanese); Garret Storms (English)
Portrayed by: Shōta Matsushima (live-action film)
Tōsuke was introduced as an original character for the 2015 anime film Gekijōban Meiji Tokyo Renka: Yumihari no Serenade, but was integrated into the main cast following the release of Full Moon. He is an inventor with a focus on electric devices and can also see spirits. Because he thinks a spirit killed his mother when he was young, he seeks to eliminate all spirits from the world.
Kōyō Ozaki (尾崎 紅葉, Ozaki Kōyō)
Voiced by: Yuichiro Umehara (Japanese); Micah Solusod (English)
Kōyō is an author and Kyōka's mentor. He was introduced as a new character for Haikara Date.
Rentaro Taki (滝 廉太郎, Taki Rentarō)
Voiced by: Shouta Aoi
Rentaro is a prodigy pianist. He was introduced as a new character for Haikara Date.
Taikan Yokoyama (横山 大観, Yokoyama Taikan)
Voiced by: Tomoaki Maeno
Taikan is an apprentice painter and Shunso's friend. He was introduced as a new character for Haikara Date.

== Media ==
=== Games ===
Release timeline
| 2011 | Meiji Tokyo Renka (Android & iOS) |
2012
| 2013 | Meiji Tokyo Renka (PSP) |
2014
| 2015 | Meiji Tokyo Renka: Twilight Kiss (PSP) |
| 2016 | Meiji Tokyo Renka: Full Moon (Vita) |
| 2017 | Meiji Tokyo Renka: Full Moon (Android & iOS) |
| 2018 | Meiji Tokyo Renka: Haikara Date (Android & iOS) |

Meiji Tokyo Renka was originally a game published for mobile phones in 2011 by Dwango. The characters were designed by Karu. The game's theme song was "Tokyo Roman Tan" by KENN. The game was ported to the PlayStation Portable by Broccoli, which released on September 26, 2013. The game's theme song is "Kurenai no Yoru no Uta" by KENN. A sequel, Meiji Tokyo Renka: Twilight Kiss, was released for the PlayStation Portable on April 23, 2015.

An updated re-release of the first game, titled Meiji Tokyo Renka: Full Moon, was released for the PlayStation Vita on August 25, 2016, which included a route for Tōsuke Iwasaki, an original character from Gekijōban Meiji Tokyo Renka: Yumihari no Serenade and Gekijōban Meiji Tokyo Renka: Hana Kagami no Fantasia. A mobile port for the iOS and Android were released on July 20, 2017.

A fourth game developed by Mages and titled Meiji Tokyo Renka: Haikara Date was released as a mobile game app on December 14, 2018.

An English version of Meiji Tokyo Renka: Full Moon was released on October 3, 2024, for the Nintendo Switch and Steam, along with a Chinese version. Meiji Tokyo Renka: Twilight Kiss will be released for the Nintendo Switch and Steam in 2026 with English, Japanese, and Chinese language options.

=== Light novels ===
Meiji Tokyo Renka was adapted into several light novels written by Yukiko Uozumi.

| No. | Title | Release date | ISBN |
|---|---|---|---|
| 1 | Meiji Tōkyō Renka: Akazukiyo no Konyakusha (明治東亰恋伽 紅月夜の婚約者) | June 30, 2012 | 978-4041003695 |
| 2 | Meiji Tōkyō Renka: Koizukiyo no Hanayome (明治東亰恋伽 恋月夜の花嫁) | March 30, 2013 | 978-4041005569 |

=== Manga ===
Meiji Tokyo Renka was adapted into a manga series by Hiyori Hinata and ran in Monthly Asuka. A manga anthology drawn by several artists was later released in 2016.

| No. | Title | Release date | ISBN |
|---|---|---|---|
| 1 | Meiji Tōkyō Renka: Oboronokoku no Gikyoku (明治東亰恋伽 朧ノ刻の戯曲) | January 22, 2013 | 978-4041206126 |
| Anthology | Meiji Tōkyō Renka: Moonlight Memories (明治東亰恋伽 ムーンライト・メモリーズ) | February 25, 2016 | 978-4758008938 |

=== Film ===
An animated film project was announced in January 2013, and the cast from the original game reprised their roles. Sumire Morohoshi was cast as Mei, who was unvoiced in the games, and the film also introduced a new original character, Tōsuke Iwasaki. The film was animated by Studio Deen and directed by Hiroshi Watanabe.

The story is centered on Kyōka Izumi's route, with new plot elements introduced through Tōsuke Iwasaki. The first film, Gekijōban Meiji Tokyo Renka: Yumihari no Serenade, was released in theaters in Japan on July 18, 2015. The theme song, "Dance in the Light", was performed by KENN. The second part, Gekijōban Meiji Tokyo Renka: Hana Kagami no Fantasia was given a one-day screening event on May 6, 2016, in select theaters due to the first film's poor box office performance.

A live-action film titled Meiji Tokyo Renka was announced in January 2018 and is slated for a 2019 release. Rikka Ihara was cast as Mei. The film also stars Yutaka Kobayashi as Charlie, Shuto Miyazaki as Ogai, Makaha Takahashi as Shunso, Taiki Yamazaki as Otojirō, Toman as Kyōka, Yuki Kubota as Gorō, Tetsuya Iwanaga as Yakumo, and Shōta Matsushima as Tōsuke. To promote the film, a live-action television series featuring the same cast will air in April 2019. Daisuke Namikawa, Nobuhiko Okamoto, and Toshiyuki Morikawa, who voiced Ogai, Kyōka, and Charlie respectively, will make voice-only cameos in the film. The theme song, "Ichiya no Eien ni Kimi Omou", will be performed by KENN.

=== Musicals ===
A musical theatre adaptation titled Kageki Meiji Tokyo Renka: Oborozuki no Chat Noir ran in June 2016. Oborozuki no Chat Noir is centered on Shunso Hishida's route. The musical was directed by Kotaro Yoshitani and written by Sayaka Sakuragi. It starred Shohei Hashimoto as Shunso, Hirofumi Araki as Ogai, Kousuke Asuma as Otojirō, Tomoru Akazawa as Kyōka, Yu Yoshioka as Gorō, Ire Shiozaki as Yakumo, and Yūya Asato as Charlie. Shion Aoki was cast as Mei. The musical was given a home release on Blu-ray and region 2 DVD on October 5, 2016, with the Blu-ray peaking at #175 and the DVD at #109 on the Oricon Weekly Charts.

A sequel stage musical titled Kageki Meiji Tokyo Renka: Gekkō no Meine Liebe ran from August 18–19, 2018 at Morinomiya Piloti Hall in Osaka and August 25-September 2, 2018, at Theatre 1010 in Tokyo. The musical focuses on Ogai Mori's route. The cast from the previous musical reprised their roles, this time with Hirofumi Araki as lead, while Momoko Suzuki was recast in the role of Mei.

=== Anime ===
An anime television series adaptation was announced at a promotional event in October 2016. Akitaro Daichi was announced as the director at the Haikara Date promotional event on January 21, 2018. The cast from the games and the anime film reprised their roles and the show is animated by TMS Entertainment. The series premiered on Tokyo MX and TVA from January 9 to March 27, 2019. The series is being simulcasted by Crunchyroll, and in Indonesia by Ponimu. It is also being given an English dub by Funimation.

The opening theme song is "Tsukiakari no Rhapsodia" by KENN. The series features three ending songs, each performed by members of the cast: "Hoshikuzu no Yomibito" by KENN and Daisuke Namikawa; "Mellow na Yoru ni Odorimashō" by Shinnosuke Tachibana and Nobuhiko Okamoto; and "Yoiya Yoiya" by Kousuke Toriumi and Jun Fukuyama.

==== Episodes ====
| No. | Title | Original release date |
|---|---|---|
| 1 | "The Unexpected Strawberry Moon"; Transliteration: "Sutoroberī Mūn wa Totsuzen ni" (Japanese: ストロベリームーンは突然に) | January 9, 2019 |
High school student Mei Ayazuki has been able to communicate with spirits ever since she was younger, causing her to be isolated from the rest of her peers. On the night of a strawberry full moon, Mei witnesses a magic show performed by traveling magician Charlie, who transports her to Tokyo during the Meiji era. A confused and amnesiac Mei encounters army surgeon Ogai Mori and art student Shunso Hishida, who escort her via horse-drawn coach to a ball held at the Rokumeikan. This is hosted by Inoue Kaoru, the Japanese Minister for Foreign Affairs who plans to foster diplomatic relations with crowned prince Nicholas II of Russia. While trying to get roast beef, Mei meets mysophobic playwright Kyōka Izumi, stage actor Otojirō Kawakami, Japanese folklore researcher Yakumo Koizumi and katana-wielding inspector Gorō Fujita. Charlie briefly arrives and explains the current situation to Mei. When the lights go out, a kitsune inside a sphere, only visible to Mei and Kyōka, abruptly appears and causes widespread panic. Mei prevents the kitsune from being slashed by Gorō, who suspects that Mei can see spirits. When the lights come back on, Ogai steps in and declares Mei as his fiancée.
| 2 | "Sukiyaki Is Romance Veiled in Steam"; Transliteration: "Gyūnabe wa yuge ni kasumu roman" (Japanese: 牛鍋は湯気にかすむロマン) | January 16, 2019 |
Mei wakes up in Ogai's mansion the next morning, recalling that Ogai used her avant-garde school uniform as a diversion to usher her into his mansion last night alongside Shunso, who has been busy painting. Aside from being amnesiac, Mei struggles to adjust living in the Meiji era since everything greatly differs from the modern age. After Ogai's maid Fumi helps Mei properly wear a kimono, Ogai and Shunso escort Mei to a sukiyaki restaurant. One year ago, Ogai stepped outside his bathroom and first met Shunso, who hurriedly sketched a fascinating black cat on the grass. Ogai then predicted that Shunso would be at the forefront of the Japanese art world someday. In the present, Ogai requests Mei to utilize her powers as a Tamayori, someone who can see spirits, in order to find Shunso's missing black cat which has disappeared from his masterpiece. At night in the park, Mei locates Charlie, who promises to send Mei back to the present during the next full moon in a month. Charlie tells Mei to just be herself and enjoy life, convincing her to invent makeshift mops for Fumi before setting off to find Shunso's missing black cat.
| 3 | "Caught in the Ghost Hotel"; Transliteration: "Gōsuto Hoteru de Tsukamaete" (Japanese: ゴーストホテルでつかまえて) | January 23, 2019 |
Mei and Shunso, who are force-fed some anpan with tea and rice by Ogai, later fail to lure the missing black cat out of hiding with smoked tuna. Kyōka ropes Mei into helping Yakumo, who wanted to apologize to his ghostly friend Jane since childhood after she disappeared in shame from revealing her true faceless appearance. Yakumo later lost the ability to see spirits after injuring his left eye in an accident, and he concludes that Jane is punishing him due to the supernatural events witnessed on the night of the full moon. Ogai enlists Shunso to protect Mei for the day. In a hotel room, Mei falls asleep when Shunso envies her for being a Tamayori. When Mei is startled by Jane, a panicked Yakumo and a patrolling Gorō barge in the hotel room. While acting as a medium, Mei explains that the heartbroken Jane tried to contact him during the night of the full moon, clarifying that she never wanted to torment him and declaring that she will always be by his side. Thanking Yakumo and Shunso for embracing her power, Mei is then escorted by Ogai, who is relieved that Mei is safe.
| 4 | "Flower of Asakusa Rendezvous"; Transliteration: "Hana no Asakusa randebū" (Japanese: 花の浅草ランデブー) | January 30, 2019 |
When Mei wakes up the next morning, she meets Ogai's aunt, who does not accept Mei as Ogai's fiancée. Although Ogai's aunt has been visiting Ogai with some matchmaking photos, Ogai plans to attend a ball next month at the Rokumeikan in order to formally present Mei as his fiancée to nobles and government officials. Ogai takes Mei to Asakusa, where she enjoys a bowl of ice cream and takes a photograph. At the Tokiwa Theater, Mei and Ogai discuss the meaning behind the opening phrase "To be, or not to be" said in Hamlet by William Shakespeare before they witness Otojirō giving a praiseworthy performance in a play of The Golden Demon by author Kōyō Ozaki. Later at a restaurant, after Ogai is impressed that Mei can use a knife and fork on her beefsteak, they are approached by noblewoman Arima and her daughter Shino, who soon learn that Mei is Ogai's fiancée. Back at the mansion, Shunso reminds Mei that she was personally chosen by Ogai, who is quite accomplished in his work. In the streets, Mei later encounters Otojirō disguised as a geisha under the moniker "Otoyakko", and he agrees to make her into a real woman.
| 5 | "The Long Road to Becoming a Fiancée"; Transliteration: "Harukanaru fianse e no michi" (Japanese: はるかなるフィアンセへの道) | February 6, 2019 |
At a room inside a geisha house in Kagurazaka, Mei is determined to become more refined. After teaching Mei how to properly look and dress like a geisha, Otojirō disciplines her to properly walk, sit, reach and even eat. Promising to keep her first training session with Otojirō a secret, Mei returns to the mansion, where she bumps into Shunso in the hallway. Already figuring out Mei's secret, Shunso requests her to pose as a model for his paintings, but he is interjected by Ogai. During her next training session with Otojirō on the next day, Mei invites Kyōka to her room inside the geisha house in order for him to avoid being chased by a dog. After giving a hungry Mei one anpan, Kyōka accidentally sets another anpan on fire while trying to sterilize it with a candle, leading them to use cushions in order to fan out the fire. Mei soon volunteers herself to be a geisha for a grand banquet at night, so Otojirō disciplines Mei on party manners. Meanwhile, Ogai invites Shunso to accompany him to an extraordinary party in the evening, where inventor Tōsuke Iwasaki plans to talk about electric generators.
| 6 | "Electricity of Dreams and Passion"; Transliteration: "Yume to jōnetsu to erekiteru" (Japanese: 夢と情熱とエレキテル) | February 13, 2019 |
Otojirō tells both Mei and Kyōka that they will be geisha in the grand banquet and serve sake to several Japanese noblemen. Mei surprisingly runs into Yakumo, Shunso and even Ogai. While trying to avoid being harassed by the drunk noblemen, Mei protects Kyōka, who decides to run away from being a geisha. After introducing Tōsuke to the noblemen, a disguised Charlie astonishingly summons a camel out of thin air, but Ogai agitates the camel, which runs loose inside the banquet room. Charlie suddenly disappears while the banquet room is magically spotless. Gorō shows up at the banquet as a bodyguard for author Fukuzawa Yukichi, who has come to hear Tōsuke's speech on electricity. However, the noblemen rebel against Tōsuke's plan to fund and utilize electricity, which has its risks and issues. Refusing the stand down, Mei lists the many modern benefits of having electricity. Pleased by this, Fukuzawa is willing to invest in Tōsuke's work. While the banquet resumes, Ogai takes Mei outside, where he reveals that she has been trained by Otojirō disguised as a geisha. Mentioning that Mei can charm everyone around her, Ogai offers her to live with him in the mansion forever.
| 7 | "I Miss You Dearly, Rainy Day"; Transliteration: "Aitakuteaitakute reinīdei" (Japanese: 逢いたくて逢いたくてレイニーデイ) | February 20, 2019 |
After having conflicting thoughts of either living with Ogai in the mansion or returning to the present during the next full moon, Mei uses a silver vine to help Shunso find his missing black cat at a park. They are chased by a flock of feral pigeons, leading them towards the Shinobazu Pond. Kyōka, who was nearby, explains to them that he wrote a dearly tragic play called Dragon Pond, but the dragon goddess Shirayuki materialized as a spirit and escaped from his script, ending up somewhere at the Shinobazu Pond. Back at the mansion, Ogai reminds Mei that she is already obligated to find Shunso's missing black cat. Kyōka is surprised when Mei returns to the Shinobazu Pond, where she continues having conflicting thoughts. Shirayuki reveals her monstrous form when Gorō tries to slash her in the Shinobazu Pond. Mei jumps into the Shinobazu Pond in order to stop Shirayuki from wreaking havoc. Ogai manages to rescue Mei from drowning, while Shirayuki returns inside Kyōka after their embrace. The next morning, Mei wakes up inside the mansion with sore muscles, and it eventually dawns on her when Kyōka informs her that his play will ready next month.
| 8 | "Masagocho Cat Café Incident"; Transliteration: "Managomachi neko kafe jihen" (Japanese: 真砂町猫カフェー事変) | February 27, 2019 |
Mei practices the waltz with Ogai before she resumes helping Shunso find his missing black cat. Yakumo then leads Mei and Shunso to a cat café, though they encounter Kyōka and Otojirō on the way. The cat café turns out to be Gorō's house, and it is revealed that Gorō is excellent at housekeeping. Otojirō, Kyōka and Yakumo decide to help out with the cooking, while Mei and Shunso are surprised when Ogai unexpectedly arrives. During dinner, Mei enjoys Kyōka's miso soup, but Ogai prevents Mei from tasting Otojirō's sake and Yakumo's sliced pickles. While washing the dishes, Gorō recalls that a ghost possessed his katana after he was forced to kill his friend Saotome, who had been possessed by the ghost. After Gorō sews up Mei's kimono which was clawed by the cats, she declines his offer of joining his division as a Tamayori because she believes that spirits have good hearts. Shunso, Otojirō, Kyōka and Yakumo drunkenly try to separate Mei from Gorō. Having a private conversation with Gorō, Ogai is shocked that Mei declined Gorō's offer. Ogai notes to Gorō that Mei manages to cheer up Shunso, Otojirō, Kyōka and Yakumo as an unruly bunch.
| 9 | "Escaping at 3 O'Clock in the Afternoon"; Transliteration: "Esukēpu gogosanji" (Japanese: エスケープ午後三時) | March 6, 2019 |
While Ogai writes a novel called The Dancing Girl, Mei contemplates staying in the Meiji era as she gazes at the moon. During breakfast the next morning, Ogai suddenly appears before Mei and Shunso, informing them that his novel is a love story. Mei and Fumi later discuss what type of love story that Ogai would write. While trying to quiet down the area, Mei notices Ogai unusually taking a bath at noon. Tenshin Okakura, who is Ogai's drinking buddy and Shunso's art teacher, barges into the mansion in order to show his overwhelming support for Ogai writing the romance novel and Shunso painting the black cat masterpiece. After Tenshin abruptly leaves, Ogai returns to his study, where it is shown that he has writer's block. Charlie appears before Mei in her bedroom at night, and he reminds her that he can send her back to the modern age during the next full moon. After Mei declares that she wants to stay in the Meiji era and live with Ogai, Charlie departs after confirming that Mei does not have to leave. As Ogai continues having writer's block, a spirit named Elise materializes and stops him from completing his romance novel.
| 10 | "Labyrinth of Love and Heartache"; Transliteration: "Aishi-sa to setsuna-sa rabirinsu" (Japanese: 愛しさと切なさラビリンス) | March 13, 2019 |
Saddened that he cannot finish his romance novel in time, Ogai fears that he will lose Mei during the next full moon. The next morning at a restaurant, Mei tries to avoid talking about Ogai's romance novel when bringing up Gorō's cat café and Kyōka's play. Ogai mentions that he might stop writing for good, but Mei urges Ogai to finish his romance novel when they return to the mansion. Mei learns from Shunso that she was the inspiration behind Ogai's romance novel, which expresses Ogai's heartache when he met and left his former lover Elise during his studies abroad in Germany. After Mei finds a fountain pen near the unfinished romance novel inside Ogai's study, she is informed by Fumi that Ogai headed into town. Shunso brings Mei back to her senses when she tries to find Ogai. After Shunso spots Ogai standing near a tree at the riverbank, Mei goes to Ogai and shows her support. As Mei vows to stay by Ogai's side forever, she returns his fountain pen. Back at the mansion, Ogai manages to finish his romance novel, but Shunso gradually loses his eyesight when he struggles to complete his black cat masterpiece.
| 11 | "Chat Noir Won't Look Back"; Transliteration: "Shanowāru wa furimukanai" (Japanese: シャノワールは振り向かない) | March 20, 2019 |
In preparation for the upcoming formal presentation, Ogai shows the design of Mei's golden ball gown. Mei is later told by Fumi that Shunso left for Tokyo University of the Arts at Ueno Park with her bonito shaving drawer instead of his paintbrush box. When Mei arrives at the art classroom, Shunso brings her outside in order to avoid his jealous male classmates. Mei and Shunso are spotted by Shunso's best friend Taikan Yokoyama, who reminds Shunso of their plan to revolutionize the art world at the upcoming exhibition. However, Taikan walks away in frustration upon realizing that Shunso has not yet considered eye surgery. Fearing that he might go blind if the eye surgery does not work, Shunso discards all of his drawings and tells Mei to leave him alone. A remorseful Shunso is shocked when Mei returns with his discarded drawings, despite all the trouble she went through to retrieve them all. After being reminded of his promise to paint a portrait of her, his eyesight is restored and his ambition to paint is rekindled. Mei finds the missing black cat, taking Shunso back to the mansion, where it reappears on his masterpiece, much to Ogai's joy.
| 12 | "Embraced by the Strawberry Moon"; Transliteration: "Sutoroberīmūn ni idakarete" (Japanese: ストロベリームーンに抱かれて) | March 27, 2019 |
Mei remembers that she befriended spirits in a small antique shop during childhood. After she eventually found out that she was different from her high school classmates, she used headphones to block out the strange voice in her head. Her life has changed ever since she first met Ogai in the Meiji era, and she realizes that the strange voice in her head was actually from Charlie. Mei tries on the golden ball gown and shares a waltz with Ogai in front of Shunso and Fumi. During the ball at the Rokumeikan on the night of the strawberry full moon, Mei surprisingly arrives wearing her school uniform instead of the golden ball gown. After Yakumo, Tōsuke, Otojirō, Kyōka and Gorō each share a waltz with Mei, Shunso waits for her outside and expresses his desire for her to stay rather than leave. At the park where Mei first met Ogai, they confess their love for each other before she bids him a heartfelt farewell. Charlie transports Mei back to the modern age, and she finally gets a chance to hang out with her high school classmates. Otojirō, Kyōka, Gorō, Yakumo and Tōsuke invite Ogai and Shunso for a meal together.

== Reception ==
Over 300,000 users had downloaded the 2011 mobile game. The PlayStation Portable port of the original game sold 5,963 copies in its first week.
