= Gekashitsu =

Short story by Kyōka Izumi

- Illustrations by Mizuno Toshikata
- Author: Kyōka Izumi
- Original title: 外科室
- Language: Japanese
- Publication date: 1895
- Publication place: Japan

"Gekashitsu (外科室, Gekashitsu)" is a short story by Kyōka Izumi. It was first published in 1895.

== Plot ==
The story is set during the Meiji period. Countess Kibune is about to have surgery, but she refuses to receive anesthesia because she has secrets to conceal.

== Movie ==
In 1992 a film based on this story was produced by Genjiro Arato with the Shochiku studio, directed by Bandō Tamasaburō V.

=== Cast ===
- Sayuri Yoshinaga
- Masaya Kato
- Kiichi Nakai
- Nakamura Kankurō V
