= Miyuri Shimabukuro =

Japanese voice actress (born 1994)

- 島袋 美由利
- Born: December 6, 1994 (age 31); Okinawa Prefecture, Japan
- Occupation: Voice actress
- Years active: 2017–present
- Agent: Office Osawa

Miyuri Shimabukuro (Japanese: 島袋 美由利, Hepburn: Shimabukuro Miyuri; born December 6, 1994) is a Japanese voice actress from Okinawa Prefecture who is affiliated with Office Osawa. After debuting as a voice actress in 2017, she played her first main roles in 2018 as Yuuna Yunohana in the anime series Yuuna and the Haunted Hot Springs, Nagisa Aragaki in the anime series Hanebado! and Inca Kasugatani in Fire Force.

== Filmography ==
=== Anime ===
2018

- Yu-Gi-Oh! VRAINS (Kiku Kamishirakawa)
- Hanebado! (Nagisa Aragaki)
- Harukana Receive (Narumi Tōi)
- Ongaku Shōjo (Shupe Gushiken)
- Yuuna and the Haunted Hot Springs (Yuuna Yunohana)
- Tsurune (Yūna Hanazawa)

2019

- The Magnificent Kotobuki (Ady)
- Carole & Tuesday (Carole Stanley)
- Granbelm (Mangetsu Kohinata)
- Fruits Basket (Yuki Soma, Young)
- Fire Force (Inca Kasugatani)

2020

- Bofuri: I Don't Want to Get Hurt, so I'll Max Out My Defense. (Syrup)
- Dorohedoro (Life-Giving Sorcerer)
- ID: Invaded (Muku Narihisago)
- Listeners (Sally Simpson)
- My Roomie Is a Dino (Kaede)
- Genie Family 2020 (Kantarō Yodayama)

2021

- Farewell, My Dear Cramer (Nozomi Onda)
- Osamake (Aoi Shida)
- I've Been Killing Slimes for 300 Years and Maxed Out My Level (Musura)
- Battle Game in 5 Seconds (Ringo Tatara)
- The Case Study of Vanitas (Louis de Sade)

2022

- Delicious Party Pretty Cure (Recipeppi, Ena Nagase, Tomoe Honma)
- Vermeil in Gold (Kohakumiya)
- Mobile Suit Gundam: The Witch from Mercury (Aliya Mahvash)

2023

- Rail Romanesque 2 (Nako)
- The Vexations of a Shut-In Vampire Princess (Karla Amatsu)
- My Daemon (Kento Tachibana)
- Dark Gathering (Dorothy Flamsteed)

2024

- Tales of Wedding Rings (Nephrites)
- Re:Monster (The Blacksmith)
- Jellyfish Can't Swim in the Night (Mei Takanashi)
- The Many Sides of Voice Actor Radio (Wakana Kawagishi)

2025

- Momentary Lily (Ayame Sakuya)
- Okinawa de Suki ni Natta Ko ga Hōgen Sugite Tsurasugiru (Suzu Higa)
- Flower and Asura (Mizuki Usurai)
- Orb: On the Movements of the Earth (Draka)
- Rock Is a Lady's Modesty (Otoha Kurogane)
- Lazarus (Drone Voice)
- Hell Teacher: Jigoku Sensei Nube (Manami Kimura)

2026

- You and I Are Polar Opposites (Azuma)
- Daemons of the Shadow Realm (Hana)
- A Tale of the Secret Saint (Charlotte)
- The Seven Knights of the Marronnier Kingdom (Colette)

=== Anime films ===
2018

- Liz and the Blue Bird (Band Staff)

2021

- Farewell, My Dear Cramer: First Touch (Nozomi Onda)
- Summer Ghost (Aoi Harukawa)

2024

- Dead Dead Demon's Dededede Destruction (Ai Demoto)
- Zegapain STA (Tsukuruna)

=== Web anime ===
2024

- Negative Happy (Hanako/Hanako Kusunoki)

=== Video games ===
2019

- Atelier Lulua: The Scion of Arland (Elmerulia Frixell)
- Azur Lane: USS Dewey (DD-349)

2021

- Dead or Alive Xtreme Venus Vacation (Nanami)

2024

- Goblin Slayer Another Adventurer: Nightmare Feast (Conan)

2025

- Assassin's Creed Shadows (Fujibayashi Naoe, Japanese dub)
- Venus Vacation Prism: Dead or Alive Xtreme (Nanami)

2026

- Goddess of Victory: Nikke (Prika)
