= Rikka Ihara =

Japanese actress (born 1999)

- 伊原 六花
- Born: Saya Hayashi; 2 June 1999 (age 27); Ōsakasayama City, Osaka, Japan
- Occupations: Actress; singer; radio personality
- Years active: 2013–present
- Employer: Foster

Saya Hayashi (林 沙耶, Hayashi Saya; born June 2, 1999), known professionally as Rikka Ihara (伊原 六花, Ihara Rikka), is a Japanese actress, singer, model, and radio personality affiliated with Foster. After learning chorus and dance and starting her career as a child actor, she was captain of the Osaka Prefectural Tomioka High School dance club, and after they came to national media attention after their appearance at the 2017 Japan High School Dance Club Championship, was scouted by Foster and was the Century 21 Girl. She also starred as Mei Ayazuki in Meiji Tokyo Renka (2019), the titular Iinchou in Donburi Iinchou (2020), Honoka Ōba on Sumo Do, Sumo Don't (2022), and Sakura Uchida in Nightmare Resort (2023). In 2019, she released "Wingbeats", a single produced by Shinichi Osawa, and was a guest vocalist for "Love Dramatic", the theme song for the anime Kaguya-sama: Love Is War.

== Biography ==
Saya Hayashi, a native of Ōsakasayama, born on June 2, 1999. She started learning ballet at the age of four and, through it, learned the joy of expressing herself with her body. She became interested in musicals after seeing a play performed by a friend of her friend's while as an elementary school second grader, and from 2008 to 2012 she took chorus and dance lessons at Kodomo Musical. She joined Gekidan ARCS in 2013 and played Jojo's sister in their musical production Zubon Senchō: Fifi and the Seven Seas.

In April 2015, she enrolled in the Osaka Prefectural Tomioka High School general course and was a member of the school's dance club, which is coached by choreographer Akane; as captain, she won numerous competitions, and in August 2017, she was part of the center when the team performed at the Japan High School Dance Club Championship and came to national media attention. She initially considered going to a university in Tokyo and auditioning, before being scouted by talent agency Foster prior to her graduation.

On October 1, 2017, she began her entertainment career under the stage name Rikka Ihara. After auditioning in February 2018, she was appointed as the Century 21 Girl, the new image character of Century 21 Real Estate's Japan division, and she began appearing in their commercials in July. After graduating from high school in March 2018, she moved to Tokyo and began working as an actress. She made her runway debut on 31 March when she appeared on the 26th Tokyo Girls Collection. Her first radio show Century 21 presents Rikka Ihara and Bukatsu Dance, airing on TBS Radio, began broadcasting in April. In June, her first photo book was released.

In January 2019, she made her debut as a singer with her single "Wingbeats", produced by Shinichi Osawa as the commercial song for Century 21. Although she had always liked singing, it was her first time singing in front of people, so she attended voice training in preparation for her debut as a singer. She was also a guest vocalist for Masayuki Suzuki's single "Love Dramatic", the theme song for the anime Kaguya-sama: Love Is War. In April 2019, she began serving as the 16th MC of Daiichi Kosho's online music programme Dam Channel.

She made her drama debut as Fumi Aso in Cheer Dan, which started airing in July 2018. In September 2018, it was announced that she would star as Mei Ayazuki in the 2019 live-action film adaptation of Meiji Tokyo Renka; this was the first time she starred in a television series or film. She made her asadora debut in Natsuzora (2019), appearing as Momoyo Morita. She was scheduled to make her stage debut as Maria at the IHI Stage Around Tokyo production of West Side Story Season 3, but it was cancelled due to the COVID-19 pandemic in Japan. She also starred as the titular Iinchou in the 2020 drama adaptation of Donburi Iinchou, Honoka Ōba on the Disney+ series Sumo Do, Sumo Don't (2022), and Sakura Uchida in the 2023 film Nightmare Resort. In 2024, she will star as Yūka Kitayama in the drama adaptation of Kanzō o Ubawareta Tsuma.

== Personal life ==
Among her hobbies are raising lizards (the leopard gecko) and Nambu ironware. Her favorite work is the novella The Little Prince.

== Filmography ==
=== Live-action television ===
| Year | Title | Role | Notes | Ref(s) |
|---|---|---|---|---|
| 2018 | We Are Rockets! | Fumi Aso | | |
| 2018 | Daiyūkai 2018 | Kimi Yoshimura | Television film | |
| 2019 | Ieyasu, Edo o Tateru | Kuri | Miniseries | |
| 2019 | Meiji Tokyo Renka | Mei Ayazuki | Lead role | |
| 2019 | Natsuzora: Natsu's Sky | Momoyo Morita | Asadora | |
| 2019 | Scandal Senmon Bengoshi: Queen | Ringo Midorikawa | Episode 1 | |
| 2020 | Donburi Iinchou | Iinchou | Lead role | |
| 2020 | 7 Secretaries | Yukari Nakagawa | Episode 7 | |
| 2021 | Air Girl | Yōko Kawamura | Television film | |
| 2021 | In His Chart | Yōko Mizunashi | | |
| 2021 | Keishichō Sōsaikkachō | Riko Kirino | Season 5, episode 1 | |
| 2022 | Sumo Do, Sumo Don't | Honoka Ōba | | |
| 2023 | Boogie Woogie | Mizuki Akiyama | Asadora | |
| 2023 | My Second Aoharu | Kiina Katsurayama | | |
| 2023 | Hold My Hand On Twilight | Chiharu Tanzawa | | |
| 2024 | Kanzō o Ubawareta Tsuma | Yūka Kitayama | Lead role | |
| 2025 | Forbidden to Love | Mizuho | Lead role | |
| 2025 | Parallel Fufu | Natsume Namikawa | Lead role | |
| 2026 | Shadows of the Ten Ninja | Yuri Kamanosuke | | |

=== Film ===
| Year | Title | Role | Notes | Ref(s) |
|---|---|---|---|---|
| 2019 | Meiji Tokyo Renka | Mei Ayazuki | | |
| 2021 | Hell's Garden | Colleague office lady | | |
| 2021 | The Land Beyond the Starry Sky | Ayumi Kamura | | |
| 2023 | Nightmare Resort | Sakura Uchida | Lead role | |
| 2024 | Fushigi Dagashiya Zenitendō | Yōko Aida | | |
| 2025 | The Boy and the Dog | Mayumi Nakagaki | | |
| 2025 | One Last Throw | Chisa Ogasawara | | |

=== Anime ===
| Year | Title | Role | Notes | Ref(s) |
|---|---|---|---|---|
| 2024 | Fushigi Dagashiya Zenitendō | Megumi | | |

== Discography ==
=== Singles ===
==== As lead artist ====
| Title | Year | Album | Ref(s) |
|---|---|---|---|
| "Wingbeats" | 2019 | Non-album single | |

==== As featured artist ====
| Title | Year | Album | Ref(s) |
|---|---|---|---|
| "Love Dramatic" (Masayuki Suzuki featuring Rikka Ihara) | 2019 | Funky Flag | |
| "Runway" (Oceans featuring Rikka Ihara) | 2022 | Oceans With Love | |
