= Reverse X Rebirth =

Japanese manga series

- Volume 1 cover, featuring Kaede Yukino (left) and Hina Nanase

リバース×リバース (Ribāsu Ribāsu)
- Genre: Romantic comedy
- Manga
- Written by: Shinobu Amano
- Published by: Hakusensha
- Imprint: Hana to Yume Comics
- Magazine: LaLa
- Original run: May 24, 2019 – September 24, 2021
- Volumes: 4

Reverse X Rebirth (Japanese: リバース×リバース, Hepburn: Ribāsu Ribāsu; pronounced "Reverse Rebirth") is a romantic comedy manga series created by Shinobu Amano and published by Hakusensha in LaLa in 2019–2021. It follows two students at a prestigious all-female school: Hina, an aspiring writer who has a fear of men, and Kaede, a man who disguises himself as a woman to hide from his grandfather, who intends to stop him from becoming an actor.

Amano originally had the idea for the manga before her previous work Last Game (2011), but had put it aside due to having trouble creating its male lead. When she returned to it, she wanted to portray different types of people with different viewpoints, writing the story with an all-seeing narrator to show what happens to both Hina and Kaede. The series was well received by critics, who found its premise fun and liked its depiction of gradual change in its characters' emotions.

== Premise ==
Reverse X Rebirth is a romantic comedy manga following Kaede Yukino (雪野 楓, Yukino Kaede) and Hina Nanase (七瀬 雛, Nanase Hina), two roommates studying at the prestigious boarding school Seika Girls' Academy.

Hina is androphobic and unable to even talk to men, which is why she studies at an all-female school; an aspiring novelist, she likes to use the school as the setting for her stories. Unbeknownst to her, Kaede is not a woman, but a cross-dressing man: with the help of his cousin Yuri Amami (天海 優里, Amami Yuri), he has disguised himself as a woman and moved to Seika to hide from his grandfather, the head of the powerful Sawarishi family, who wants him to become his successor and give up his dream of becoming an actor. Kaede is attracted to Hina, but does not dare to reveal his true identity to her, and instead he and Yuri try to help her overcome her fear of men. Meanwhile, Hina begins to find Kaede attractive as a woman, finding him similar to the character Lady Marianne from her novels.

== Production and release ==
Reverse X Rebirth was written and illustrated by Shinobu Amano, and was originally conceived prior to her earlier series Last Game (2011) as a story about a girl who is nervous around her cross-dressing roommate, not realizing that he is not a woman. She put this idea on hold for some time while writing Last Game, having trouble creating a believable male character that could fit into that type of scenario.

When eventually returning to the idea, Amano wanted to portray people from different walks of life with different viewpoints, while writing Yuri as similar to herself, and wrote the series from the perspective of an all-seeing narrator to allow readers to follow what happens with both Kaede and Hina. She enjoyed writing the development of Kaede and Hina's relationship and the turning point in it when Kaede learns who he really is; as she personally likes misunderstanding-based comedy, she knew from the beginning that she wanted to write a scene where Kaede, who until then has been forced to dress like a woman, is forced to dress like a man to explain who he is. Amano has described having difficulty in designing appealing male characters, and so she found Reverse X Rebirth a comfortable series to work on, being able to design and draw Kaede the same way she would design a female character.

The series was published in Hakusensha's shōjo manga magazine LaLa from May 24, 2019, to September 24, 2021. The first two chapters were written as one-shots, before the publisher picked it up for serialization. Hakusensha collected the series across four tankōbon volumes released under its imprint Hana to Yume Comics from February 5, 2020, to December 3, 2021, with cover designs similar to yuri manga. The Chingwin Publishing Group began publishing the series in Chinese on November 26, 2020.

=== Volumes ===
No.	Release date	ISBN
1	February 5, 2020	978-4-592-22036-7
Chapter 1–4; Last Game: "Tokubetsu-hen" (特別編; "Special Chapter")
2	October 5, 2020	978-4-592-22037-4
Chapter 5–10
3	July 5, 2021	978-4-592-22038-1
Chapter 11–16; "Omake Yonkoma" (おまけ4コマ; "Bonus Yonkoma")
4	December 3, 2021	978-4-592-22039-8
Chapter 17–20; "Saishuuwa" (最終話; "Final Chapter")

== Reception ==
Reverse X Rebirth was well received, including its one-shots, which was what led the publisher to pick it up for serialization; Mangapedia called it one of Amano's major works, along with Last Game and Hokenshitsu no Kageyama-kun (2017). Natalie appreciated the series for showing a liberal view of gender and thought that it succeeds in carefully depicting gradual emotional changes its characters go through, considering it characteristic of Amano and LaLa. They thought that the premise of a character having an external reason to cross-dress makes for both fun storytelling and reader wish fulfillment. They did question how Kaede's voice does not give him away, but did not consider it the kind of detail that would necessarily disrupt a reader's suspension of disbelief. One of their favorites scenes was one when Hina dresses up for a dance party, considering it to have a classic kind of appeal. Da Vinci described the story as full of thrills, and found it exciting to follow the development of Kaede and Hina's relationship.

== See also ==
- Last Game — Another manga series by the same author.
