= Shinnosuke Tachibana =

Japanese voice actor, singer and narrator

- 立花 慎之介
- Born: April 26, 1978 (age 48); Gifu, Gifu Prefecture, Japan
- Occupations: Voice actor; singer; narrator
- Years active: 2003–present
- Agent: BLACK SHIP
- Spouse: Ao Takahashi (m. 2017)
- Children: 1
- Website: tachibanashinnosuke.com

Shinnosuke Tachibana (立花 慎之介, Tachibana Shinnosuke; born April 26, 1978) is a Japanese voice actor, singer and narrator. He is married to voice actress Ao Takahashi.

== Career ==
Tachibana graduated from Aojijuku Tokyo School 18th term. In 2003, he made his voice acting debut as Kyuu in the television anime E's Otherwise. He was affiliated with Production Baobab until May 2011. He joined Axlone since June of the same year.

On January 5, 2017, a blog reported that Tachibana had married Ao Takahashi.

In 2018, Tachibana left Axlone and co-founded the BLACK SHIP agency with fellow voice actor Jun Fukuyama.

== Filmography ==
=== Anime ===
2003

- Da Capo, student (ep 3)
- D.N.Angel, classmate (ep 21)
- E's Otherwise, Kyuu

2004

- Akane Maniax, Male student (ep 1)
- Futakoi, Man (ep 9)
- Keroro Gunso, Curious onlooker (ep 19)
- Midori Days, Customer (ep 8); Friend B (ep 5)

2005

- Bokusatsu Tenshi Dokuro-chan, Matsunaga (ep 2); Yoshida (ep 5,7)
- Minami no Shima no Chiisa na Hikouki Birdy, Robert

2006

- Fushigiboshi no Futago Hime Gyu!, Thomas
- Ghost Hunt, Man (ep 11)
- Higurashi no Naku Koro ni, Man B (ep 25); Villager (ep 4)
- Kiba, Gale (ep 5,6); Herrick; Police E (ep 1); Rebellion Soldier (ep 3); Street Soldier (ep 2)
- Love Get Chu, Shinsuke Yamashita
- Mamoru-kun ni Megami no Shukufuku wo!, Takayuki Watanabe
- Tonagura!, Fanclub member A (ep 7,8); Male student (ep 5)

2007

- Gakuen Utopia Manabi Straight!, Takefumi Amamiya
- Myself ; Yourself, Sana Hidaka
- Romeo × Juliet, Benvolio
- Nodame Cantabile, Tomoharu Katayama
- Saint Beast, Middle Angel
- My Bride Is a Mermaid, Bob

2008

- Sekirei, Minato Sahashi
- Xam'd: Lost Memories, Furuichi Teraoka
- Toradora!, Stalker Man

2009

- Inazuma Eleven, Yuuki Tachimukai

2010

- Kuroshitsuji, Soma Asman Kadar
- Uragiri wa Boku no Namae o Shitteiru, Luze Crosszeria (Luka's twin brother), Uzuki
- Sekirei: Pure Engagement, Minato Sahashi
- Jewelpet Twinkle, Jinnai Yuma

2011

- Itsuka Tenma no Kuro Usagi, Taito Kurogane
- Yumekui Merry, Takateru Akiyanagi
- Kami-sama no Memo-chō´, Shinozaki Toshi
- Oniichan no Koto Nanka Zenzen Suki Janain Dakara ne!! (Keiichirō Kishikawa)
- Pokémon: Black & White: Rival Destinies, Yuto (Ep 61-62)
- Sekai-ichi Hatsukoi, Chiaki Yoshino
- Stardust wink, So Nagase
- Nyanpire, Vampire

2012

- Bakuman. 3, Toru Nanamine
- Ginga e Kickoff!!, Ryuuji Furuya
- Mobile Suit Gundam AGE, Gren Raize
- Tight Rope, Naoki Satoya
- Kamisama Hajimemashita, Tomoe
- Zero no Tsukaima, Vittorio Serevare (Season Four)

2013

- Gundam Build Fighters, Nils Nielsen
- Makai Ouji: Devils and Realist, Beelzebub
- My Mental Choices are Completely Interfering with my School Romantic Comedy, God

2014

- Haikyuu!!, Morisuke Yaku
- Kuroshitsuji: Book of Circus, Prince Soma Asman Kadar
- Mekakucity Actors, Shuuya Kano
- Majin Bone, Luke
- The Pilot's Love Song, Benjamin Sharif
- Tokyo Ghoul, Seidō Takizawa
- Gundam Build Fighters Try, Nils Nielsen

2015

- Kamisama Kiss◎, Tomoe
- Go! Princess PreCure, Prince Kanata
- Minna Atsumare! Falcom Gakuen SC, Jusis Albarea
- Tokyo Ghoul √A, Seidō Takizawa
- Makura no Danshi, Yayoi Chigiri
- Huyao Xiao Hongniang, Fan Yun Fei
- Haikyu!! 2nd Season, Morisuke Yaku
- Yamada-kun to 7-nin no Majo, Shinichi Tamaki
- Overlord, Peroroncino

2016

- Big Order, Yoshitsune Hiiragi
- D.Gray-man Hallow, Howard Link, replacing Daisuke Kishio who voiced him in the 2006 D.Gray-Man series.
- Sekkō Boys, Medici
- Macross Delta, Norman Claus
- Nobunaga no Shinobi, Akechi Mitsuhide
- Age 12: A Little Heart Pounding, Inaba Mikami
- Hitori no Shita: The Outcast, Xu Si
- Udon no Kuni no Kiniro Kemari, Hiroshi Nagatsuma
- Trickster, Haruhiko Hanasaki

2017

- Oushitsu Kyoushi Heine, Maximillian
- Hitorijime My Hero, Asaya Hasekura
- Konbini Kareshi, Mikado Nakajima
- Love and Lies, Yūsuke Nisaka
- Nekopara (OVA), Kashou Minaduki
- Nobunaga no Shinobi: Ise Kanegasaki-hen, Mitsuhide Akechi
- Ousama Game The Animation, Naoya Hashimoto
- Hitori no Shita: The Outcast 2nd Season, Xu Si
- Dynamic Chord, Tokiharu Hanabusa

2018

- Beyblade Burst Super Z, Suoh Goshuin
- Tokyo Ghoul:re, Seidō Takizawa
- Nobunaga no Shinobi: Anegawa Ishiyama-hen, Mitsuhide Akechi
- Yume Ōkoku to Nemureru 100-Nin no Ōji-sama, Gilbert
- Senjūshi, Charleville
- Boarding School Juliet, Aby Ssinia
- Angolmois: Record of Mongol Invasion, Kagesuke Shōni

2019

- Meiji Tokyo Renka, Yakumo Koizumi
- To the Abandoned Sacred Beasts, Daniel Price (Spriggan)
- Kochoki: Wakaki Nobunaga, Takugen Sōon
- Demon Slayer: Kimetsu no Yaiba, Rui's Father

2020

- number24, Ikuto Yufu
- Nekopara, Kashou Minaduki
- A Destructive God Sits Next to Me, Kimikage Mogami
- IDOLiSH7 Second Beat!, Yuki
- Plunderer, Robert Du Vanvigh
- The Misfit of Demon King Academy, Leorig Indu

2021

- IDOLiSH7 Third Beat!, Yuki
- How Not to Summon a Demon Lord Ω, Banakness

2022

- Mahjong Soul Pong, Hideki Akitomo
- Trapped in a Dating Sim: The World of Otome Games Is Tough for Mobs, Brad Fou Field
- Blue Lock, Aoshi Tokimitsu

2023

- Chillin' in My 30s After Getting Fired from the Demon King's Army, Lizette
- Am I Actually the Strongest?, Laius

2024

- The Demon Prince of Momochi House, Yukari
- 7th Time Loop: The Villainess Enjoys a Carefree Life Married to Her Worst Enemy!, Kaine Tully
- Wonderful PreCure!, Meemee
- A Salad Bowl of Eccentrics, Takeo
- Haigakura, Rakan

2025

- Promise of Wizard, Shylock
- The Mononoke Lecture Logs of Chuzenji-sensei, Reijiro Enokizu
- The Too-Perfect Saint: Tossed Aside by My Fiancé and Sold to Another Kingdom, Reichert Parnacorta

2026

- The Invisible Man and His Soon-to-Be Wife, Twin
- The Forsaken Saintess and Her Foodie Roadtrip in Another World, Senon
- Tokyo Revengers, Imaushi Wakasa

2027

- Chōjin-teki Share House Story Charisma, Sōemon Nakakami

=== Original video animation ===
- Deadman Wonderland, Akira Shindō (2011)
- Kamisama Hajimemashita, Tomoe (2013)
- Yamada-kun to 7-nin no Majo, Shinichi Tamaki (2014)
- Kuroshitsuji: Book of Murder, Soma Asman Kadar (2015)
- Haikyuu!!: Lev Genzan!, Morisuke Yaku (2015)
- Gundam Build Fighters Try: Island Wars, Nils Nielsen (2016)
- Kamisama Hajimemashita: Kako-hen, Tomoe (2016)
- Trick or Alice, Shizuku Minase (2016)

=== Theatrical animation ===
- Gekijōban Meiji Tokyo Renka: Yumihari no Serenade, Yakumo Koizumi (2015)
- Haikyuu!! Movie 1: Owari to Hajimari, Morisuke Yaku (2015)
- Peace Maker Kurogane Movie 1: Omou Michi, Suzu Kitamura (2018)
- Haikyu!! The Dumpster Battle, Morisuke Yaku (2024)

=== Tokusatsu ===
2016

- Doubutsu Sentai Zyuohger, Gakkarize (Ep 43)

=== Digital comics ===
- Bakuman (voice comic) (Akito Takagi)

=== Video games ===
- Infinite Undiscovery (2008) (Capel)
- Valkyrie Profile: Covenant of the Plume (2008) (Kristoph)
- Atelier Rorona: The Alchemist of Arland (2009) (Yksel Jahnn)
- Record of Agarest War Zero (2009) (Sieghart)
- Last Escort: Club Katze (2010) (Tsubasa)
- Tokimeki Memorial Girl's Side: 3rd Story (2010) (Seiji Shitara)
- Atelier Totori: The Adventurer of Arland (2010) (Yksel Jahnn)
- Final Fantasy XIV: A Realm Reborn (2013) (Alphinaud Leveilleur)
- Si-Nis-Kanto (2013) (Eshika)
- The Legend of Heroes: Trails of Cold Steel (2013) (Jusis Albarea)
- Snow Bound Land (2013) (Orva)
- Houkago Colorful*Step ~Bunka-bu!~ (2014) (Uguisu Hinayama)
- Touken Ranbu (2015) (Koryuu Kagemitsu)
- Xenoblade Chronicles X (Custom Male Avatar)
- Crash Fever (2015) (Zhuangzi)
- IDOLiSH7 (2015) (Yuki)
- Dissidia Final Fantasy (2015) (Ramza Beoulve)
- Bleach: Brave Souls (2016) (Seinosuke Yamada)
- Boyfriend (Kari 2016) (Amane Keito)
- Epic Seven (2017) (Cidd)
- Sdorica -Sunset- (2018) (Ned Garcia Alznar, Charle Ceres)
- Edge of Awakening (2019) (Matsuo Bashō)
- Saint Seiya Awakening (2019) (Gemini Saga)
- Ayakashi: Romance Reborn (2019) (Shizuki)
- Promise of Wizard (2019) (Shylock)
- Lord of Heroes (2020) (Laphlaes Selkena)
- Gate of Nightmares (2021) (Allen Nanatori, Leonys Aubreo)
- Arknights (2022) (Shalem)
- Honkai: Star Rail (2023) (Argenti)
- Lovebrush Chronicles (2023) (Alkaid McGrath)
- Reverse: 1999 (2023) (Diggers)
- Love and Deepspace (2024) (Qi Yu / Homura / Rafayel)
- Ride Kamens (2024) (Soun)
- Wuthering Waves (2026) (Luuk Herssen)

=== Drama CDs ===
- Cuticle Detective Inaba (Kei Nozaki)
- Di(e)ce (Kazuki Naruse)
- Kamisama Kiss (Tomoe)
- Persona 3 (Keisuke Hiraga)
- Ten Count (Tadaomi Shirotani)
- Last Game (Souma Kei)
- Bloody+Mary (Ichirou Rosario di Maria)
- Saiyuki Ibun (Houmei)
- Otona Keikenchi (Yumeji)
- Alice=Alice (Sanngatsu Usagi)
- Someone Special (Reo Haruyama)
- Yuugen Romantica (Iriya)
- Mo Dao Zu Shi/Ma Dou So Shi (Xiao Xingchen/Kyou Shinjin)
- Paradox Live (Shion Kaida)
- Fabulous Night (Chouji Sengoku)

=== Dubbing ===
==== Live-action ====
- The Comebacks (Randy Randinger)
- iCarly (Harry)
- Maleficent (Prince Phillip)
- Shoebox Zoo (John Roberts)
- The Signal (Nic Eastman (Brenton Thwaites))
- Son of a Gun (JR (Brenton Thwaites))
- The Untamed (trailer only) (Lan Wangji (Wang Yibo))

==== Animation ====
- Batman: The Brave and the Bold (Ryan Choi/Atom)
- Foster's Home for Imaginary Friends (Dylan)
- The Incredible Hulk (Rick Jones)
- Mo Dao Zu Shi (Lan Wangji)
