= Friends (Japanese band) =

Japanese rock band

Friends フレンズ
- Origin: Tokyo, Japan
- Genres: Rock, J-Pop
- Years active: 2015–present
- Label: Sony Music Entertainment Japan
- Members: Emi Okamoto (vocals); Ryōhei Nagashima (bass); Tarō Miura (guitar, vocals); Louie Sekiguchi (drums, vocals)
- Past members: Hirose Hirose (keyboard, vocals)
- Website: friends-jpn.com

Friends (フレンズ) is a Japanese rock band from Tokyo which is signed to Sony Music Entertainment Japan. It began activities in 2015 after members Hirose Hirose and Emi Okamoto made a collaboration; they would later be joined by bassist Ryōhei Nagashima, guitarist Tarō Miura, and drummer Rui Sekiguchi; Hirose would later leave the band in 2021. The band's music has been featured in movies, TV dramas, and anime series such as Hori-san to Miyamura-kun.

== History ==
The band's activities began in 2015 when Hirose Hirose, a member of the band Nicoten, decided to hold a live performance to celebrate his 25th birthday. He wanted to form a band with a female lead vocalist for the occasion, and decided to collaborate with musician Emi Okamoto, who at the time was a member of the band The Love Ningen and someone whom he had collaborated with previously. Needing a bassist, Hirose invited a friend, Ryōhei Nagashima of the band The Telephones, to join the band; Nagashima in turn invited Louie Sakaguchi to serve as the band's drummer. The band debuted on June 8, 2015, as a highlight of Hirose's birthday live. The band's name came after Okamoto saw a bar named Philippine Pub Friends and sent photos of it to the other band members, who decided that the word Friends would make a good band name. In 2016, Tarō Miura, formerly of the band Holidays of Seventeen, joined Friends.

Many of the band's early releases were only released at their live performances or by mail order, although their first mini-album Show-Time sold over 3,000 copies. Their first full album Baby Tanjō! (ベビー誕生!) was released on April 5, 2017. Their next release was the mini-album Petit Town (プチタウン) on November 22, 2017. This was followed by the extended play Bedside Music (ベッドサイドミュージック) on March 21, 2018. They released their second album Conparch! (コン・パーチ!) on August 1, 2018.

The band released the single "Tanoshimou/I o You" (楽しもう/iをyou) on June 26, 2019; "Tanoshimou" was used as the theme song to the film Bento Harassment, while "I o You" was used as the ending theme to the television drama What Did You Eat Yesterday?.

In December 2020, it was announced that Hirose would suspend activities with the band and would not appear in their upcoming performances; he would ultimately leave the band in April 2021 after his contract was canceled over unspecified issues. The band released the single "Yakusoku" (約束) on March 17, 2021; the title song was used as the ending theme to the anime television series Horimiya. They released their third album Solar on August 4, 2021.

== Members ==
=== Current members ===
Emi Okamoto (おかもと えみ, Okamoto Emi; born November 10, 1990)
Okamoto serves as the band's lead vocalist. She is also active as a solo musician.
Ryōhei Nagashima (長島 涼平, Nagashima Ryōhei; born May 18, 1984)
Nagashima serves as the band's leader and bassist. He also serves as bassist of the rock band The Telephones. He was chosen to be the leader after a game of Uno.
Tarō Miura (三浦 太郎, Miura Tarō)
Miura serves as the band's guitarist, replacing an earlier temporary member.
Louie Sakaguchi (関口 塁, Sakaguchi Rui)
Sakaguchi, formerly of the band The Mirraz, serves as the band's drummer.

=== Former members ===
Hirose Hirose (ひろせ ひろせ, Hirose Hirose; born June 8, 1990)
Hirose served as the band's keyboardist, composer, and secondary vocalist, before leaving in April 2021.

== Discography ==
=== Singles ===
- "Tanoshimou/I o You" (楽しもう/iをyou) (Release date: June 26, 2019)
- "Akubi o Sureba" (あくびをすれば) (Release date: June 17, 2020)
- "Yakusoku" (約束) (Release date: March 17, 2021)

=== Extended plays ===
- Bedside Music (ベッドサイドミュージック) (Release date: March 21, 2018)

=== Albums ===
- Baby Tanjō! (ベビー誕生!) (Release date: April 5, 2017)
- Conparch! (コン・パーチ!) (Release date: August 1, 2018)
- Solar (Release date: August 4, 2021)

=== Mini-albums ===
- Petit Town (プチタウン) (Release date: November 22, 2017)
