= Kenn (actor) =

Japanese actor and singer (born 1982)

- ケン
- Born: Ken'ichirō Ōhashi; March 24, 1982 (age 44); Tokyo, Japan
- Occupations: Actor; voice actor; singer
- Years active: 2004–present
- Agent: Zynchro
- Notable work: Yu-Gi-Oh! GX as Judai Yuki (known as Jaden Yuki in the English dub)
- Musical career
- Genre: J-pop
- Instruments: Vocals; keyboards
- Labels: EM2; 5pb.

Ken'ichirō Ōhashi (大橋 賢一郎, Ōhashi Ken'ichirō; born March 24, 1982), better known by the stage name Kenn (ケン, Ken), stylized as KENN, is a Japanese actor, voice actor and singer from Tokyo, Japan.

== Career ==
=== Voice acting ===
Ōhashi made his debut as a voice actor in 2004 in the Japanese anime Yu-Gi-Oh! GX (Yu-Gi-Oh! Duel Monsters GX in Japan) as Judai Yuki (Jaden Yuki in the English-dubbed version), the protagonist of the series and his most known role. He also performed in the musical adaptation of the popular sports anime The Prince of Tennis as Yuta Fuji, the younger brother of Seigaku's Shusuke Fuji.

=== Music ===
Ōhashi was the vocalist and keyboardist of the rock band The NaB's from 2003 until October 2006, when the band suspended activities, leading him to pursue a solo career in 2009.

KENN played the part of Ikuto in the musical adaptation of Peach Pit's manga Shugo Chara!.

=== Talent agency ===
Ōhashi joined the talent agency Zynchro in October 2018.

== Filmography ==
=== Animated television series ===
2004

- Yu-Gi-Oh! GX (Judai Yuki)

2006

- Air Gear (Kazuma Mikura)
- Digimon Savers (Kouki Tsubasa, BioThunderbirmon, Darkdramon)
- Katekyo Hitman Reborn! (Dino)

2008

- Live On Cardliver Kakeru (Chikara Akamaru)
- The Tower of Druaga: The Aegis of Uruk (Jil)

2009

- Fresh Pretty Cure! (Kazuki Ichijo)
- Miracle Train: ōedo-sen e Yōkoso (Fumi Roppongi)
- The Tower of Druaga: The Sword of Uruk (Jil)

2010

- Black Butler II (Ronald Knox)
- Jewelpet Twinkle (Jasper)
- The Legend of the Legendary Heroes (Lafra)

2011

- Jewelpet Sunshine (Jasper)
- Last Exile: Fam, The Silver Wing (Dinesh (eps 12–13); Fritz)
- Pretty Rhythm Aurora Dream (Hibiki)
- Toriko (Takimaru)

2012

- Ginga e Kickoff!! (Kota Furuya)
- Hunter × Hunter (Second Series) (Phinks)
- Jewelpet Kira☆Deco—! (Jasper)
- Monsuno (Chase Suno)
- Pretty Rhythm Dear My Future (Hibiki)
- Uchū Kyōdai (Hibito Nanba)

2013

- Ace of Diamond (Carlos Toshiki Kamiya)
- Assassination Classroom OVA (Hiroto Maehara)
- Brothers Conflict (Asahina Fūto)
- Beyond the Boundary (Akihito Kanbara)
- Jewelpet Happiness (Jasper)
- Kyōkai no Kanata: Idol Saiban! - Mayoi Nagara mo Kimi o Sabaku Tami (ONA) Akihito Kanbara (eps 1, 3)
- Mushibugyo (Jinbei Tsukishima)
- Neppu Kairiku Bushi Road (Suo Yagyu)
- Samurai Flamenco (Kuroki Anji)

2014

- Akatsuki no Yona (Tae-woo)
- Ao Haru Ride (Kominato Aya)
- Baby Steps (Yoshiaki Ide)
- Black Butler ~Book of Circus~ (Ronald Knox)
- Lady Jewelpet (Miura)
- Majin Bone (Shōgo Ryūjin)
- Mushibugyo OVA (Jinbei Tsukishima)
- Parasyte -the maxim- (Mitsuo)
- Space Dandy (Isaac)
- Terra Formars (Alex Kandley Stewart)

2015

- Ace of Diamond 2nd Season (Carlos Toshiki Kamiya)
- Baby Steps Season 2 (Yoshiaki Ide)
- Durarara!!x2 Ten (Eijiro Sharaku)
- Macross Delta (Bogue Con-Vaart)
- The Heroic Legend of Arslan (Gieve)
- Star-Myu: High School Star Musical (Izumi Toraishi)

2016

- Ajin (Watanabe (eps 1–2))
- The Heroic Legend of Arslan: Dust Storm Dance (Gieve)
- Days (Himura Mayumi)
- Divine Gate (Uwain)
- Durarara!!x2 Ketsu (Eijiro Sharaku)
- Izetta: The Last Witch (Hans)
- Macross Delta (Bogue Con-Vaart)
- Magic★Kyun! Renaissance (Aoi Suminomiya)
- Scared Rider Xechs (Mutsuki Hijiri)
- Terra Formars: Revenge (Alex Kandley Stewart)
- Tsukiuta. The Animation (Aoi Satsuki)
- Twin Star Exorcists (Yamato)

2017

- Altair: A Record of Battles (Kyros γιός Apollodorus)
- Children of the Whales (Rohalito No Amonrogia)
- Kenka Bancho Otome: Girl Beats Boys (Totomaru Minowa)
- Marginal #4: Kiss kara Tsukuru Big Bang (L Nomura)
- My Hero Academia (Native)
- Star-Myu: High School Star Musical 2 (Izumi Toraishi)

2018

- Black Clover (Leopold Vermillion)
- Butlers: Chitose Momotose Monogatari (Yuki Fujishiro)
- Hoshin Engi (Ko Tenka)
- IDOLiSH7 (Tamaki Yotsuba)
- Piano no Mori (Lev Shimanovski)

2019

- Ace of Diamond Act II (Carlos Toshiki Kamiya)
- Afterlost (Rui)
- Ahiru no Sora (Masahiro Saki)
- Demon Slayer: Kimetsu no Yaiba (Kamanue)
- Is It Wrong to Try to Pick Up Girls in a Dungeon? II (Hyakinthos Clio)
- JoJo's Bizarre Adventure: Golden Wind (Secco)
- Meiji Tokyo Renka (Hishida Shunsou)
- My Hero Academia 4 (Toya Setsuno)
- Star-Myu: High School Star Musical 3 (Izumi Toraishi)
- Try Knights (Akira Kariya)
- YU-NO: A Girl Who Chants Love at the Bound of this World (Abel)

2020

- IDOLiSH7 Second Beat! (Tamaki Yotsuba)
- Tsukiuta. The Animation 2 (Aoi Satsuki)

2021

- Cells at Work! Code Black (Red Blood Cell)
- I-Chu: Halfway Through the Idol (Seiya Aido)
- IDOLiSH7 Third Beat! (Tamaki Yotsuba)
- Muteking the Dancing Hero (Suteking)
- SD Gundam World Heroes (Yan Huang Zhang Fei God Gundam)

2022

- Bleach: Thousand-Year Blood War (Berenice Gabrielli)
- Eternal Boys (Ui Hakosaka)
- Mobile Suit Gundam: The Witch from Mercury (Ojelo Gabel)
- Platinum End (Penema)

2023

- Dog Signal (Suzunosuke Kubō)
- I'm in Love with the Villainess (Rod Bauer)

2024

- Failure Frame: I Became the Strongest and Annihilated Everything with Low-Level Spells (Shōgo Oyamada)
- Tasūketsu (Ren Iruga)

2025

- City the Animation (Tatsuta Adatara)
- Magic Maker: How to Make Magic in Another World (Einzwerf)
- The Too-Perfect Saint: Tossed Aside by My Fiancé and Sold to Another Kingdom (Mamon)

=== Anime films ===
- Yonna in the Solitary Fortress (2006), Garuda
- Yu-Gi-Oh!: Bonds Beyond Time (2010), Judai Yuki
- Eiga Jewelpet Sweets Dance Princess (2012), Jasper
- Hunter × Hunter: Phantom Rouge (2013), Phinks
- Uchū Kyōdai#0 (2014), Hibito Nanba
- Beyond the Boundary: I'll Be Here – Past (2015), Akihito Kanbara
- Beyond the Boundary: I'll Be Here – Future (2015), Akihito Kanbara
- Gekijōban Meiji Tokyo Renka: Yumihari no Serenade (2015), Hishida Shunsou
- Black Butler: Book of the Atlantic (2017), Ronald Knox

=== Original net animation ===
- SD Gundam World Sangoku Soketsuden (2019) Zhang Fei God Gundam
- Cap Kakumei Bottleman (2020), Ryō Hokari
- Oshiete Hokusai!: The Animation (2021), Kōrin Ogata
- Super Crooks (2021), Forecast
- Cyberpunk: Edgerunners (2022), David

=== Tokusatsu ===
2014

- Ressha Sentai ToQger the Movie: Galaxy Line S.O.S. (Hound Shadow)

2025

- No.1 Sentai Gozyuger (GoodeBurn/BearKuma50)

=== Drama CD ===
- Dear Vocalist (Ciel)
- The Demon Prince of Momochi House (Aoi Nanamori/Nue)
- The Demon Prince of Momochi House Part 2 (Aoi Nanamori/Nue)
- The Demon Prince of Momochi House Part 3 (Aoi Nanamori/Nue)
- You Got Me, Sempai! (Higuchi)

=== Video games ===
- Akane sasu Sekai de Kimi to Utau (Takasugi Shinsaku)
- Akiba's Beat (Reiji Shinomiya)
- Arknights (Vigil)
- Blazer Drive (Daichi)
- Boyfriend(kari) (Shota Kitagawa)
- Bungo and Alchemist (Saneatsu "Musha" Mushanokōji)
- Brothers Conflict: Brilliant Blue (Fūto Asahina)
- Brothers Conflict: Passion Pink (Fūto Asahina)
- Bustafellows (Limbo Fitzgerald)
- Cupid Parasite (Shelby Snail)
- Desert Kingdom (Sera)
- Desert Kingdom Portable (Sera)
- Destiny Child (Frej)
- Digimon World: Next Order (Kouta Hirose)
- Double Score ~Cattleya x Narcissusp~ (Tomu)
- Double Score ~Marguerite x Tulip~ (Tomu)
- Dragalia Lost (Harle, Karl)
- Fantasy Life i: The Girl Who Steals Time (Edward)
- Fate/Grand Order (Hassan of the Shining Star)
- Final Fantasy XIV: A Realm Reborn (Urianger, Wedge, and Isse)
- Final Fantasy XIV: Dawntrail (Urianger)
- Final Fantasy XIV: Endwalker (Urianger)
- Final Fantasy XIV: Heavensward (Urianger)
- Final Fantasy XIV: Shadowbringers (Urianger)
- Final Fantasy XIV: Stormblood (Urianger)
- Fire Emblem Engage (Fogado)
- Fortissimo (Fūto Asahina)
- Gakuen Club ~Houkago no Himitsu~ (Asahi Minakawa)
- Glass Heart Princess (Shinnosuke Masaki)
- Glass Heart Princess: Platinum (Shinnosuke Masaki)
- Hakuouki Urakata (Katsura Kogorou)
- Hunter x Hunter: Greed Adventure (Phinks)
- Hunter x Hunter: World Hunt (Phinks)
- I Doll U (Ruka)
- I-Chu (Seiya Aido)
- IDOLiSH7 (Tamaki Yotsuba)
- Jewelic Nightmare (Adamas/Sumeragi Seiichirou)
- Ken ga Kimi (Kei)
- Ken ga Kimi: Momoyo Tsuzuri (Kei)
- Kenka Bancho Otome: Girl Beats Boys (Totomaru Minowa)
- Kenka Banchou Otome ~Kanzen Muketsu no My Honey~ (Totomaru Minowa)
- League of Legends (Kayn)
- Magic★Kyun! Renaissance (Aoi Suminomiya)
- Magical Days The Brats' Parade (Kaworu Kanno)
- Marginal #4: Idol of Supernova (L Nomura)
- Marginal #4: Road to Galaxy (L Nomura)
- Master Detective Archives: Rain Code (Desuhiko Thunderbolt)
- Kin'iro no Corda 3 AnotherSky (Aoba Kuramochi)
- Meiji Tokyo Renka (Hishida Shunsou)
- Meiji Tokyo Renka Twilight Kiss (Hishida Shunsou)
- Minus Eight (Kuramochi Aoba)
- Mobile Suit Gundam: U.C. ENGAGE (Judau Ashta)
- Onmyoji (Kidoumaru)
- Phoenix Wright: Ace Attorney - Dual Destinies (Apollo Justice, Clay Terran)
- Phoenix Wright: Ace Attorney - Spirit of Justice (Apollo Justice)
- Photograph Journey (Mizuki Saikusa)
- Pokémon Masters (Brawly)
- Reine des Fleurs (Orpheus)
- Renai Banchou: Koi Seyo Otome! Love is Power (Sawayaka Banchou)
- Renai Princess ~Nisemono Hime to 10-nin no Kon'yakusha~ (Abel Oakwood)
- Scared Rider Xechs (Hijiri Mutsuki)
- Scared Rider Xechs -STARDUST LOVERS- (Hijiri Mutsuki)
- Scared Rider Xechs 1 + FD Portable (Hijiri Mutsuki)
- SD Gundam Battle Alliance (Hermes Mercury)
- Shining Force Feather (Rash)
- Soukai Buccaneers! (Crave Foster)
- Soulcalibur V (Patroklos Alexander)
- Stand My Heroes (Shion Hinata)
- Tenkaichi★Sengoku LOVERS DS (Keiji Maeda)
- The Exorcism of Maria (Joker)
- The Exorcism of Maria Complete Edition (Joker)
- The Exorcism of Maria: La Campanella (Joker)
- The King of Fighters All Star (Krohnen)
- The King of Fighters XV (Krohnen McDougall (K9999))
- Tsukino Paradise (Aoi Satsuki)
- Un:Birthday Song ~Ai o Utau Shinigami~ (Shizuru Hayasaka)
- Vitamin XtoZ (Tenjuro Narumiya)
- VitaminZ (Tenjuro Narumiya)
- VitaminZ Graduation (Tenjuro Narumiya)
- VitaminZ Revolution (Tenjuro Narumiya)
- Xenoblade Chronicles 2 (Perceval/Vasara)
- Ys VIII: Lacrimosa of Dana (Hummel Trabaldo)
- Yu-Gi-Oh! Arc-V Tag Force Special (Judai Yuki)
- Yu-Gi-Oh! Cross Duel (Judai Yuki)
- Yu-Gi-Oh! Duel Links (Judai Yuki/Supreme King)
- Yu-Gi-Oh! GX Tag Force (Judai Yuki)
- Yu-Gi-Oh! GX Tag Force 2 (Judai Yuki)
- Yu-Gi-Oh! GX Tag Force 3 (Judai Yuki)
- Yunohana SpRING! (Kintaro Katagiri)
- Yunohana SpRING! ~Cherishing Time~ (Kintaro Katagiri)
- Yunohana SpRING! ~Mellow Times~! (Kintaro Katagiri)

=== Dubbing ===
==== Live-action ====
- The Adventurer: The Curse of the Midas Box (Mariah Mundi (Aneurin Barnard))
- Barbie (Artist Ken (Ncuti Gatwa))
- Cinderella (John (James Acaster))
- The Favourite (Samuel Masham (Joe Alwyn))
- Freaks Out (Cencio (Pietro Castellitto))
- Gossip Girl (Akeno "Aki" Menzies (Evan Mock))
- Haute Cuisine (Nicolas Bauvois (Arthur Dupont))
- Jumanji: Welcome to the Jungle (Jefferson "Seaplane" McDonough (Nick Jonas))
- Keys to the Heart (Jin-tae (Park Jeong-min))
- The Knight of Shadows: Between Yin and Yang (Yan Fei (Austin Lin))
- Lights Out (Bret (Alexander DiPersia))
- Mortdecai (Maurice (Guy Burnet))
- Operation Proposal (Kang Baek-ho (Yoo Seung-ho))
- Ready Player One (Wade Watts / Parzival (Tye Sheridan))
- Resident Alien (Ben Hawthorne (Levi Fiehler))
- Resident Evil
- Stalker's Prey (Bruce Kane (Mason Dye))
- Your Honor (Adam Desiato (Hunter Doohan))

==== Animation ====
- Inside Job (Brett Hand)
- Invincible (Mark Grayson/Invincible)
- Playmobil: The Movie (Emperor Maximus)
- Trolls (Branch)
- Trolls Band Together (Branch)
- Thunderbirds Are Go (John Tracy)

=== Other ===
- Gyakuten Saiban 4 (Housuke Odoroki) (Promotional video only)
- Huntik: Secrets & Seekers (Lok Lambert)
- Chaotic (Tom Majors)

== Stage appearances ==
TENIMYU: THE PRINCE OF TENNIS MUSICAL SERIES (as Yuta Fuji)

- The Prince of Tennis Musical: More than Limit St. Rudolph Gauken (2004)
- The Prince of Tennis Musical: Side Yamabuki feat. St. Rudolph (In Winter of 2004–2005)
- The Prince of Tennis Musical: Dream Live 2nd (2005)
- The Prince of Tennis Musical: The Imperial Match Hyotei (guest) (2005)
- The Prince of Tennis Musical: The Imperial Match Hyotei in Winter (In Winter of 2005–2006)
- The Prince of Tennis Musical: The Final Match Rikkai Second feat. the Rivals (2009–2010)
- The Prince of Tennis Musical: Dream Live 7th (2010)

Musical Air Gear (as Kazu)

- Musical Air Gear (2007)
- Musical Air Gear: Musical Air Gear vs. Bacchus Super Range Remix (2007)
- Musical Air Gear: Musical Air Gear vs. Bacchus Top Gear Remix (2010)

Shugo Chara! the Musical (2009) (as Ikuto Tsukiyomi)

Rebocon (2010–2011) (as Dino)

Magdara na Maria (as Baron Carl)

== Discography ==
- Livin' On the Edge
- SLASH
- THE LIFE
- Miracle Train Character Song Vol.1
- Black Butler II Character Song Vol.10
- Beyond the Boundary Character Song Vol.2
