= Kyōka Izumi =

Japanese writer (1873–1939)

Izumi Kyōka
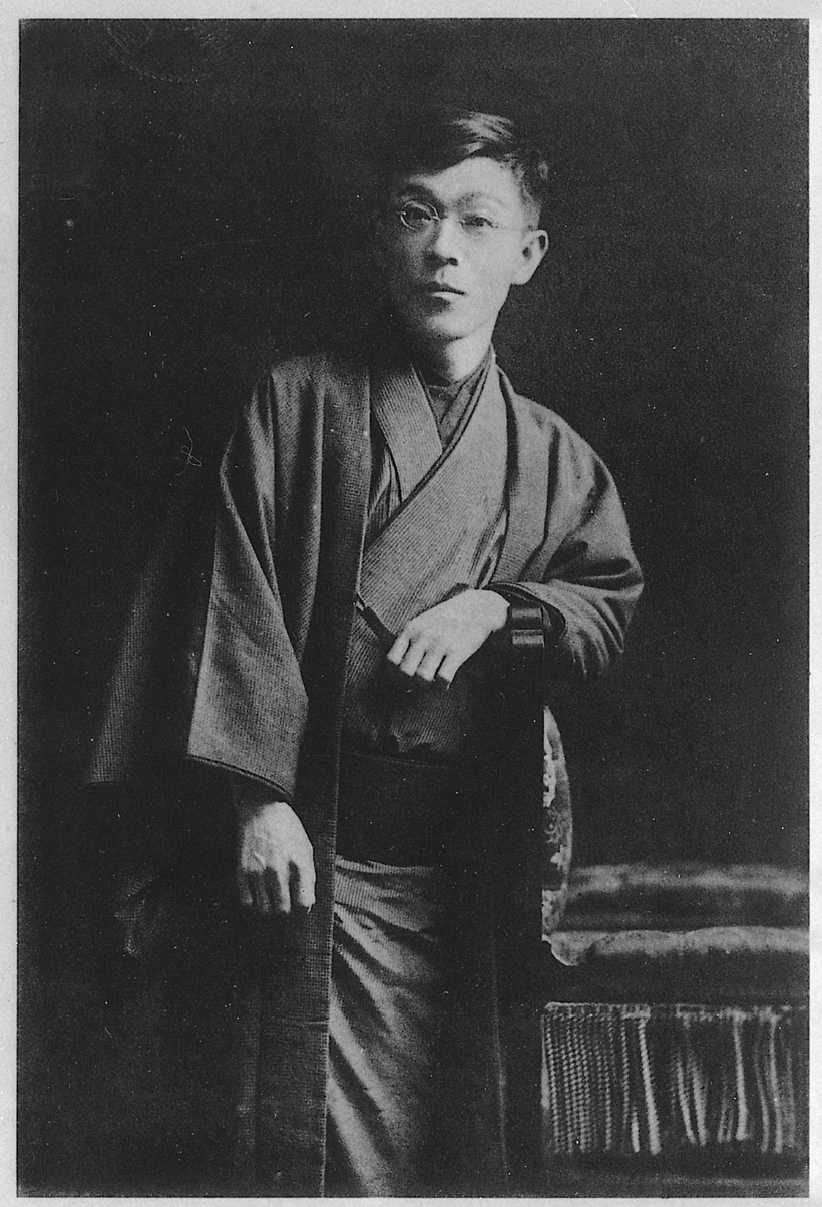
- Born: Kyōtarō Izumi; 4 November 1873; Kanazawa, Ishikawa, Japan
- Died: 7 September 1939 (aged 65); Tokyo, Japan
- Occupation: Writer
- Writing career
- Genres: Novels, short stories, plays, haiku

Kyōtarō Izumi (泉 鏡太郎, Izumi Kyōtarō; 4 November 1873 – 7 September 1939), known by his pen name Izumi Kyōka (泉 鏡花), (Note: Japanese pronunciation: [í.(d͡)zɨ̀.mʲì | ꜜk̟ʲj̊ó̞ò̞.kä̀, ì.(d͡)zɨ́.mʲí k̟ʲj̊ó̞ò̞.kä̀, í.(d͡)zɨ̀.mʲì | k̟ʲj̊ò̞ꜜó̞.kä́, í.(d͡)zɨ̀.mʲì | ꜜk̟ʲj̊ó̞ó̞.kä́, í.(d͡)zɨ̀.mʲì k̟ʲj̊ò̞ò̞.kä̀]) was a Japanese novelist, writer and kabuki playwright who was active during the prewar period.

Kyōka's writing differed greatly from that of the naturalist writers who dominated the literary scene at the time. Many of Kyōka's works are surrealist critiques of society. He is best known for a characteristic brand of Romanticism preferring tales of the supernatural heavily influenced by works of the earlier Edo period in Japanese arts and letters, which he tempered with his own personal vision of aesthetics and art in the modern age.

He is also considered one of the supreme stylists in modern Japanese literature, and the difficulty and richness of his prose has been frequently noted by fellow authors and critics. Like Natsume Sōseki and other Japanese authors with pen names, Kyōka is usually known by his pen name rather than his real given name.

== Life ==
=== Before Tokyo ===
Kyōka was born Izumi Kyōtarō on November 4, 1873 in the Shitashinmachi section of Kanazawa, Ishikawa, to Izumi Seiji (泉 清次, Izumi Seiji), a chaser and inlayer of metallic ornaments, and Nakata Suzu (中田 鈴, Nakata Suzu), daughter of a tsuzumi hand-drum player from Edo and younger sister to lead protagonist of the Noh theater, Kintarō Matsumoto. Because of his family's impoverished circumstances, he attended the tuition-free Hokuriku English-Japanese School, run by Christian missionaries.

Even before he entered grade school, young Kyōtarō's mother introduced him to literature in picture-books interspersed with text called kusazōshi, and his works would later show the influence of this early contact with such visual forms of story-telling. In April 1883, at nine years old, Kyōka lost his mother, who was 29 at the time. It was a great blow to his young mind, and he would attempt to recreate memories of her in works throughout his literary career.

In 1890, Kyōka went to Tokyo in order to follow the footsteps of Ozaki Kōyō, a literary figure of this time. From 1891-1894 Kyōka lived with Ozaki Kōyō and performed houseboy duties for him in return for his expertise opinions on his work. Kyōka was deeply impressed by Ozaki Kōyō's "Amorous Confessions of Two Nuns" and decided to pursue a career in literature. That June he took a trip to Toyama Prefecture. At this time he worked as a teacher in private preparatory schools and spent his free time running through yomihon and kusazōshi. In November of that year, however, Kyōka's aspiration to an artistic career drove him to Tokyo, where he intended to enter the tutelage of Kōyō himself.

On 19 November 1891, he called on Kōyō in Ushigome (牛込) (part of present-day Shinjuku) without prior introduction and requested that he be allowed into the school immediately. He was accepted, and from that time began life as a live-in apprentice. Other than a brief trip to Kanazawa in December of the following year, Kyōka spent all of his time in the Ozaki household, proving his value to Kōyō through correcting his manuscripts and household tasks. Kyōka greatly adored his teacher, thinking of him as a teacher of more than literature, a benefactor who nourished his early career before he gained a name for himself. He felt deeply a personal indebtedness to Kōyō, and continued to admire the author throughout his life.

=== Early career ===
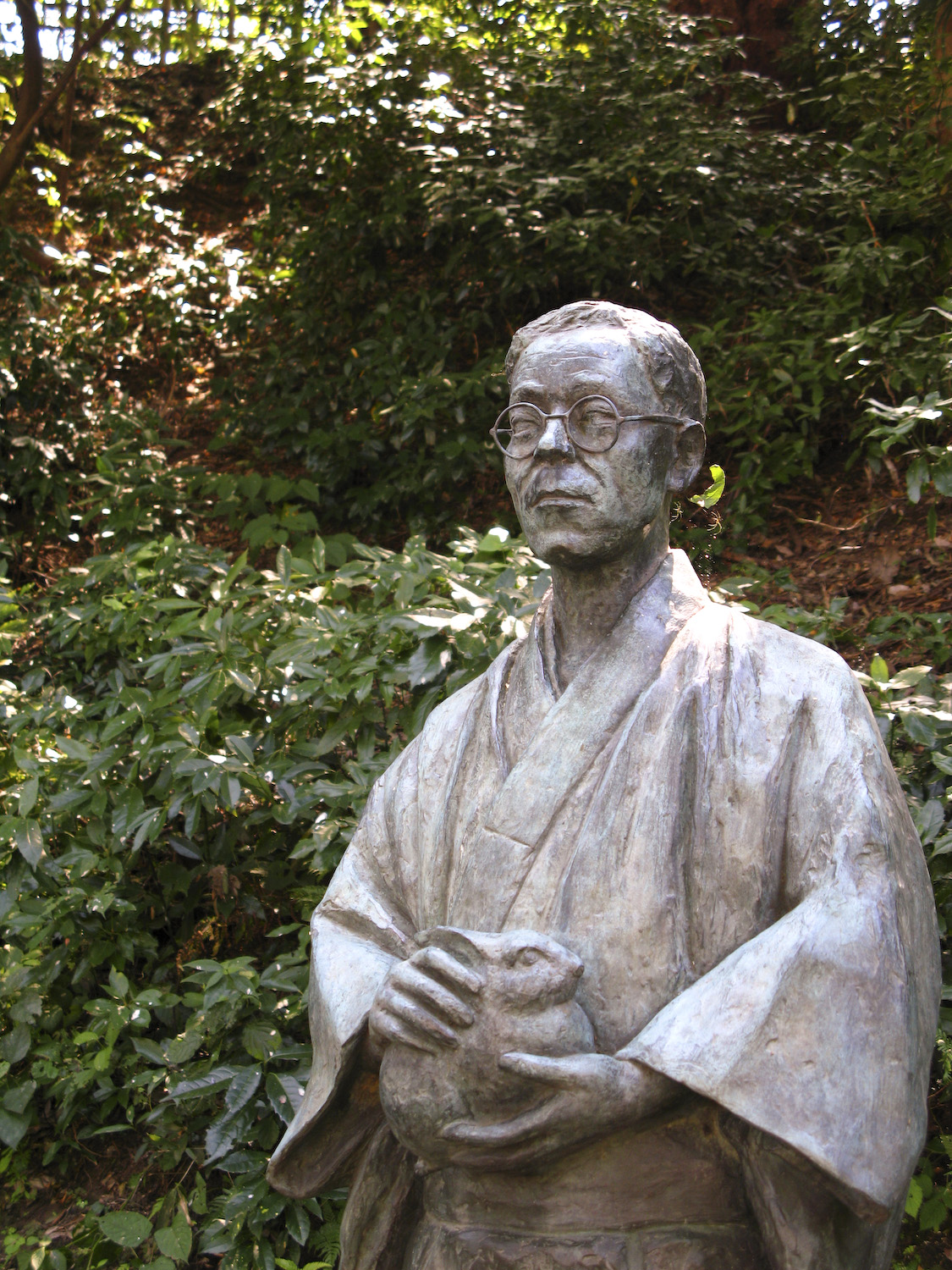
Statue of Izumi in Kanazawa.

Kyōka's first published work, "Yazaemon Kanmuri" (冠弥左衛門, Kanmuri Yazaemon), was serialized beginning in May 1893 in Kyoto's Hinode Shimbun (Now The Kyoto Shimbun). Apparently it was very unpopular and the editor requested the story be dropped immediately; however, due to Kōyō's pleadings on the part of his young student, Kyōka was allowed to print the entire story. The next year the story was resold to the Kaga, Ishikawa Hokuriku Shinpo, once again for serialization. This time Kyōka's work gained some favorable criticism, though most likely through Kōyō's active involvement.

In that same year, "A Living Puppet" (活人形, Iki-ningyō) was published by Tantei Bunko and "The Golden Clock" (金時計, Kindokei) by Shonen Bungaku. In August he returned to Kanazawa to get treatment for beriberi and took the opportunity to travel around Kyoto and the Hokuriku region before returning to Tokyo. He would later use the record he kept of his travels as a basis for his "Another Man's Wife" (他人の妻, Tanin no Tsuma), though the actual record is not extant.

January 9 of 1894, his father died and he once again returned to Kanazawa. Facing an uncertain future, Kyōka worried about his means of obtaining a livelihood for himself and his relatives, a grandmother and younger brother; however, with his grandmother's encouragement he returned to his work in Tokyo. In October, he published "The Reservist" (予備兵, Yobihei) and "The Righteous and the Chivalrous" (義血侠血, Giketsu Kyōketsu), after substantial corrections from Kōyō, in the Yomiuri Shimbun. "The Righteous and the Chivalrous" would later be staged as The Water Magician (滝の白糸, Taki no Shiraito).

The next year in February, in order to continue to support his family in Kanazawa, Kyōka moved into the Otowa Ohashi household in Koishikawa in Tokyo to follow work on an encyclopedia. On his departure, Kōyō treated Kyōka to a Western style dinner where he taught his student to use a knife and fork.

In April 1895, Kyōka's first, real critical success, “The Night Watchman” (夜行巡査, Yakōjunsa), was published in the magazine Bungei Kurabu. Thanks to Reiun Taoka's praise of the story, Kyōka's next work, “The Operating Room” (外科室, Gekashitsu), appeared in Bungei Kurabu's opening pages; thus began Kyōka's entry into literary circles.

In May 1896, Kyōka paid his grandmother, now in her mid-seventies, a visit in Kanazawa, and the next year he decided to get his own house in Koishikawa and bring her to live with him. In spite of the beriberi that had not completely healed over the years, he was prolific at this time, though his work received mixed reviews. "The Holy Man of Mount Kōya (高野聖, Kōya Hijiri)," considered by many to be his most representative work and one of his most frequently read, was published in 1900.

=== Mature writer ===
In 1902, suffering from gastrointestinal problems, Kyōka retired to Zushi to convalesce. While there, a woman named Ito Suzu (伊藤 すず, Itō Suzu), whom Kyōka had met through a childhood friend, helped him in the kitchen. In May 1903, the two began living together in Ushigome, in a hanamachi called Kagurazaka. However, they were unable to get married immediately due to strong objections by Kōyō.

In October of that same year, Kyōka's mentor, Ozaki Kōyō, died. Even on his deathbed, Kōyō continued to worry over Kyōka's future, and he continued to correct Kyōka's manuscripts. Then, in 1906, Kyōka lost his grandmother at the age of 87. His stomach troubles worsened and he returned to Zushi. Originally intending only to spend a summer there, he rented the house for four years. During this time he ate mainly rice gruel and sweet potatoes. In spite of illness that often left him in a dream-like state and a house that leaked when it rained, he managed to compose several stories there, including "One Day in Spring" (春昼・春昼後刻, Shunchū/Shunchū gokoku). In fact, his illness and the poor conditions at his rented house in Zushi might have contributed to the story's other-worldly atmosphere. In 1908, he went back to Tokyo and found a place in Kōjimachi.

Both "Samisen Canal" (三味線堀, Shamisenbori) and "A Song by Lantern Light" (歌行燈, Uta Andon) were published in 1910. Kafū Nagai praised "Samisen Canal." At the same time, the first five volumes of Kyōka's collected works were published.

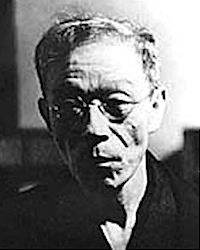
Izumi circa 1930s

With growing popularity supporting him, Kyōka began the Taishō period by extending his efforts into the theater. In 1913, he composed Demon Pond (夜叉ヶ池, Yasha ga Ike) and The Sea God's Villa (海神別荘, Kaijin Bessō), and the next year, Nihonbashi (日本橋) was published.

He continued to have problems with beriberi, and in the summer of 1916, he spent a good portion of three months inside.

=== Final years ===
In 1927, Kyōka traveled to the Tōhoku region, where he visited Lake Towada and Akita Prefecture. The next year, he contracted pneumonia and, after recovery, visited Shuzenji hot-spring resort in the mountains in Izu, Shizuoka Prefecture. Then in 1929 he returned to Ishikawa prefecture, this time to visit the scenic Noto Peninsula.

He kept a number of journals of his travels, and he continued to write short stories and plays. In 1937, his last great project, pink ume blossoms (薄紅梅, Usu Kōbai) was serialized in the Tokyo Mainichi and Osaka Mainichi newspapers. He was inducted the same year into the Imperial Arts Society.

Finally his ill-health took its toll, and, on 7 September 1939, at 2:45 in the morning, Izumi Kyōka died of lung cancer. He is buried at Zōshigaya Cemetery in Tokyo.

== Legacy ==
Kyōka's grave in Zōshigaya cemetery.

Eccentric and superstitious, Kyōka developed a reputation for writing about the grotesque and the fantastic. However, he did not use fantasy to escape from what was happening in the real world, but for criticizing it. Kyōka saw humans through the lens "of evolutionary regression, whether man into beast or adult into child," indicative of his critique of modern society. The Holy Man of Mount Kōya (高野聖, Kōya Hijiri)," is a tale about a monk's journey through a mountainous wilderness, encountering inexplicable and unsettling experiences. Borrowing and embellishing themes from Edo-period popular fiction, folklore and Noh drama, more than half of Kyōka's works incorporate some form of supernatural element as well as apparent symbolism in the form of explicit color coding. The Ruby, first published and performed in 1913, daringly applies this chain of color-coded images to tell a beautifully poetic story of adultery, eroticism, and jealousy. Kyōka's narrative style borrows from traditional rakugo storytelling, and also uses dramatic dialogues similar to that used in kabuki drama. Kyōka often depicted life in the hanamachi of downtown Edo or Tokyo, which is why he is often compared with his contemporaries Nagai Kafū and Tanizaki Jun'ichirō. However, Kyōka makes much more use of a complex plot and suspense in his narrative. Another thematic concept strong in his writings is that of a beautiful older woman taking care of a young man.

His plays are particularly popular in Japan: such works as Demon Pond (夜叉ヶ池, Yasha ga Ike), The Sea God's Villa (海神別荘, Kaijin bessō), and The Castle Tower (天守物語, Tenshu monogatari) are performed regularly. This was not always the case, however, as few of his plays were performed while he was alive. His plays only became popular in the 1950s, but some scholars attribute his lasting impact to dramatizations and adaptations of his prose fiction, usually done by other authors.

The Izumi Kyōka Prize for Literature is a literary award established by the city of Kanazawa, first awarded in 1973 on the hundredth anniversary of Kyōka's birth.

=== In fiction ===
- Izumi Kyōka plays a supporting role in the novel Teito Monogatari (Aramata Hiroshi), along with many other historical characters from the Meiji Restoration and the Showa Era. In the first film adaptation of the novel, he is portrayed by popular Kabuki actor Bandō Tamasaburō V.
- A female character named Izumi Kyōka appears in the manga Bungo Stray Dogs, which takes the names, biographies and literary works of authors to make characters.
- Another female Izumi Kyōka is featured in a chapter of the JoJo's Bizarre Adventure spin-off, Thus Spoke Kishibe Rohan, as the titular character's editor, appearing alongside other characters named after authors and poets.
- Izumi Kyōka appears in the multimedia series Meiji Tokyo Renka as one of Mei's love interests.

== Selected works in translation ==
- Izumi Kyoka (1956). "A Tale of Three Who Were Blind". Modern Japanese Literature. Translated by Edward Seidensticker. Donald Keene, ed. New York: Grove Press. pp. 242–253. ISBN 0-8021-5095-0.
- Izumi Kyoka (1996). Charles Shiro Inouye (ed.). Japanese Gothic Tales. Translated by Charles Shiro Inouye. Honolulu: University of Hawaii Press. ISBN 0-8248-1789-3.
- Izumi Kyoka (2004). Charles Shiro Inouye (ed.). In Light Of Shadows: More Gothic Tales By Izumi Kyoka. Translated by Charles Shiro Inouye. Honolulu: University of Hawaii Press. pp. 242–253. ISBN 0-8248-2894-1.
- An online translation of The Holy Man of Mount Koya by Steven W. Kohl.
- Izumi Kyoka (2007). Demon Lake. Translated by Kimpei Ohara; Rick Broadaway (bilingual ed.). Tokyo: Hokuseido Press. ISBN 978-4-590-01216-2.
- Izumi Kyoka (2010). "Sea Daemons" trans. Ginny Tapley Takemori, Kaiki: Uncanny Tales from Japan Volume 2: Country Delights, Kurodahan Press ISBN 978-4-902075-09-0.
- Izumi Kyoka (2017). "Tale of the Enchanted Sword" (妖剣記聞, Yōken Kibun, 1920) trans. Nina Cornyetz, in The Asia Pacific Journal, March 15, 2018. Volume 16, Issue 6 Number 1. Awarded the 2017 Kyoko Selden Memorial Translation Award.
- Poulton, M. Cody (2001). Spirits of Another Sort: The Plays of Izumi Kyoka. Ann Arbor: Center for Japanese Studies, The University of Michigan. ISBN 0-939512-01-7. (Note: Includes English translations of Demon Pond (夜叉ヶ池, Yasha ga Ike), The Sea God's Villa (海神別荘, Kaijin Bessō), and The Castle Tower (天守物語, Tenshu Monogatari))
