= Muteking the Dancing Hero =

Japanese anime television series

- Key visual for the series
- Created by: Tatsunoko Production
- Based on: Muteking, The Dashing Warrior
- Developed by: Yūji Kondō
- Directed by: Ryōsuke Takahashi (Note: Credited as Chief Director (総監督, Sō Kantoku)); Yūzō Satō
- Music by: Takamitsu Shimazaki; Takeshi Masuda
- Country of origin: Japan
- Original language: Japanese
- No. of episodes: 12

Production
- Producers: Kousuke Fumi; Takefumi Kanari; Marie Matsunaga; Kento Sudou
- Animators: Tatsunoko Production; Tezuka Productions
- Production companies: Tatsunoko Production; Muteking Production Committee (Note: A production committee label that consists of various companies.)

Original release
- Network: TVO, TVA, Tokyo MX, BS NTV, AT-X
- Release: October 3 – December 19, 2021

Related
- Muteking, The Dashing Warrior

Muteking the Dancing Hero (stylized in all caps) is an anime television series produced by Tatsunoko Production and Tezuka Productions, serving as a reboot to Tatsunoko's 1980–1981 television series Muteking, The Dashing Warrior and aired from October to December 2021 on TV Osaka and other channels.

== Characters ==
Muteki (ムテキ)
Voiced by: Kentarō Mashiro, Ibuki Kido (young)
DJ
Voiced by: Takuya Eguchi, Nobutsugi Riina (young)
Seo (セオ)
Voiced by: Satoshi Hino
Aida-san (アイダさん)
Voiced by: Rie Takahashi
An (アン)
Voiced by: Madoka Yonezawa
Naomi (ナオミ)
Voiced by: Azusa Tadokoro
Sara (サラ)
Voiced by: Rikako Aikawa
Vivi (ヴィヴィ)
Voiced by: Kazuyuki Okitsu
Haru (ハル)
Voiced by: Keiga
Summer (サマー, Samā)
Voiced by: Hayato Kimura
Aki (アキ)
Voiced by: Minami Tanaka
Winter (ウィンター, Wintā)
Voiced by: Koutaro Nishiyama
Suteking (ステキング, Sutekingu)
Voiced by: KENN
Matt (マット, Matto)
Voiced by: Yutaka Aoyama
Tommy (トミー, Tomī)
Voiced by: Takashi Matsuyama
George (ジョージ, Jōji)
Voiced by: Wataru Hatano
Owen (オーウェン, Ōwen)
Voiced by: Kenichi Suzumura

== Production ==
The series was announced on June 1, 2019. Tatsunoko Production and Horipro held the audition for the titular character who will also get a contract with the latter as well as perform original songs for the show. Applications lasted until July 19th with the final round taking place by September 8th.

Co-produced by Tatsunoko and Tezuka Productions, the series was directed by Yūzō Satō, with Ryōsuke Takahashi as chief director with series composition by Yūji Kondō, original character designs by Utomaru, main character designs by Yuichi Takahashi, character designs and chief animation direction by Shinji Seya, Masafumi Satō serving as assistant director and battle dance director, Takamitsu Shimazaki and Takeshi Masuda composing the series' music and Hiroshi Sasagawa serving as executive director.

The opening theme is titled, "Labyrinth", performed by Orange Range, while the ending theme is titled, "Kibō no Uta" (Song of Hope), performed by Kalma. It aired from October 3 to December 19, 2021, on TV Osaka and other channels. Funimation streamed the anime.

== Episodes ==
No.	Title	Directed by (Note: Information is taken from the ending credits of each episode.)	Written by	Storyboarded by	Original release date
1	"Muteking Begins"	Yō Watanabe, Yūzō Satō	Yūji Kondō	Yō Watanabe, Yūzō Satō	October 3, 2021
2	"Brand-new Gadget"	Fumio Maezono	Yūji Kondō	Akira Oguro	October 10, 2021
3	"Rock and Rolling"	Yorifusa Yamaguchi, Masafumi Satō	Hiroko Kanasugi	Masayoshi Nishida	October 17, 2021
4	"Chill Out Sunset"	Hiromichi Matano	Taketo Shinkai	Masayoshi Nishida	October 24, 2021
5	"Goodbye Park"	Sumito Sasaki	Hiroko Kanasugi	Akira Oguro	October 31, 2021
6	"Stand Alone"	Fumio Maezono	Hiroko Kanasugi	Masayoshi Nishida	November 7, 2021
7	"Stage of Dreams"	Hiromichi Matano	Yūji Kondō	Keiichirō Kawaguchi	November 14, 2021
8	"Muteki Mode"	Yorifusa Yamaguchi, Sumito Sasaki	Hiroko Kanasugi	Akira Oguro	November 21, 2021
9	"In the Dark"	Kazuki Yokouchi	Hiroko Kanasugi	Kazuki Yokouchi	November 28, 2021
10	"Sweet Memories"	Yūji Tokuno	Yūji Kondō	Yūji Tokuno	December 5, 2021
11	"Heartbreak"	Hiromichi Matano	Yūji Kondō	Hiromichi Matano	December 12, 2021
12	"The Dancing Hero"	Fumio Maezono, Masafumi Satō	Yūji Kondō	Kazuki Yokouchi, Masafumi Satō, Yūzō Satō	December 19, 2021

== Reception ==
Caitlin Moore of Anime News Network praised most of the show's key point such as its heavy themes of "gentrification and tech-driven homogenization" of society alongside the show's music while concluding that the show "failed to wrap up the story in a satisfying way and would be a bit judgemental".
