= Palette (EP) =

EP by Nobuhiko Okamoto
- Released: 23 May 2012
- Recorded: 2011–2012
- Genre: J-Pop
- Length: 26:21
- Label: Kiramune

Nobuhiko Okamoto chronology
Palette (2012)	Enjoy☆Full (2013)

Palette is the debut mini-album of Japanese voice actor and J-Pop singer, Nobuhiko Okamoto. It was released in Japan on 23 May 2012 on Kiramune.

== Summary ==
Two types of release Edition luxury and board, DVD was recorded making and PV of future sketch is included in the former. In addition, message card is enclosed as Limited benefits of various.

According to Okamoto, the title "Palette" refers to the intention of wanting to enjoy the different shades of all six songs.

The album was charted 9th on the Oricon and was sold over 0.6 million copies.

== Song information ==
- "Positive Fighter" - Because of the up-tempo, while recording, the songs note also has a different pitch in the outside.
- "Eien Tokei (永遠時計; lit. "Eternal clock")" - Okamoto's Adult contemporary medium ballad.

== Track listing ==
No.	Title	Lyrics	Music	Length
1.	"Mirai Sketch (未来スケッチ)"	Ryuji Matsumura	Takeshi Masuda	4:25
2.	"Sniper"	Hiroshi Sasaki		4:09
3.	"Asphalt no Hana (アスファルトの花)"	Yūsuke Toriumi	Yūsuke Yamamoto	4:21
4.	"Positive Fighter"	Yūgo Sasakura		4:28
5.	"Eien Dokei (永遠時計)"	Takeshi Masuda		4:59
6.	"nonstop"	Kensuke Okamoto	Takahiro Yamada	4:07
Total length:				26:21

DVD (only First Press Limited Edition)

1. 未来スケッチ -Music Video-
2. making of 未来スケッチ
3. TRAILER

== Charts ==
Chart	Peak position	Sales
Oricon Weekly Albums	6 (Daily Albums); 9 (Weekly Albums)	6 million
Billboard JAPAN Top Albums	8	6 million
Nielsen SoundScan	13	6 million
