= Enjoy Full =

EP by Nobuhiko Okamoto
- Released: 5 June 2013
- Recorded: 2013
- Genre: J-Pop
- Length: 27:34
- Label: Kiramune

Nobuhiko Okamoto chronology
Palette (2012)	Enjoy Full (2013)	Parading (2014)

Enjoy Full (stylized as Enjoy☆Full) is the second mini-album of Japanese voice actor and J-Pop singer, Nobuhiko Okamoto. It was released in Japan on 5 June 2013 on Kiramune.

== Summary ==
Two types of release Edition luxury and board, DVD was recorded making and PV of future sketch is included in the former. In addition, message card is enclosed as Limited benefits of various.

== Track listing ==
No.	Title	Lyrics	Music	Length
1.	"Good Luck (グッドラック)"	Kensuke Okamoto	Kensuke Okamoto	4:21
2.	"REC"	Kensuke Okamoto	Kensuke Okamoto	4:09
3.	"Love Searcher"	Kotomi Fukagawa	Kawahara Mine Akira	4:38
4.	"ONE"	Haru Wabun	Takeshi Masuda	4:52
5.	"Theme song (テーマソング)"	Kisuke	Sho Watanabe, Teppei Shimizu	4:52
6.	"Seishun Time Machine (青春タイムマシン)"	mavie	Wataru Maeguchi	4:41
Total length:				27:34

DVD (only First Press Limited Edition)

1. グッドラック -Music Video-
2. making of グッドラック
3. TRAILER

== Charts ==
Chart	Peak position	Sales
Oricon Weekly Albums	17	-
