= Polytechnic schools in Japan =

Polytechnic schools (職業能力開発校, Shokugyō nōryoku kaihatsukō) in Japan are vocational education institutions for short and long-term programs, a group of public human resources development facilities under paragraph (1) (i) of Article 15-6 of the Human Resources Development Promotion Law. It involves designated private sector as well.

== Categories ==
There are several types of facilities providing public vocational training in Japan. There are mainly two administrating offices at state level, the Ministry of Health, Labour, and Welfare (MHLW) and the Ministry of Education, Culture, Sports, Science and Technology (MEXT).

There are four operators of those MHLW administered vocational training facilities; Cities and municipalities (towns and villages), prefectures, the Japan Organization for Employment of the Elderly, Persons with Disabilities and Job Seekers (JEED) and the state. Types of educational facilities include Polytechnic Schools, Polytechnic Colleges, Polytechnic Universities, Polytechnic Centers, and Polytechnic Schools for Persons with Disabilities. They serve for different groups of people wishing to obtain vocational skills.

Polytechnic Schools admit the youngest group of applicants as graduates of junior high and high schools. General unemployed and employed are studying with them, too. Cities and municipalities run one facility, and there were 156 prefectures operated, both statistics of 2013.

At Polytechnic Colleges, high school graduates are required to have finished specialized programs before admission, as advanced vocational training is provided. Opeators are both JEED for one college and prefectures for 13 as of 2013.

JEED is the sole operator for Polytechnic Universities, totaled to 10 in 2013. Those universities offer vocational training as "the professional course" for those who have finished advanced special programs, either they are high school graduates or adults. High school graduates are offered 2,800 hours in two-year program. Tuition was JPY390,000 in 2012, on top of the entrance fee of JPY169,200. Those who finished the professional course can apply for "the advanced course", which they will finish in two –years' term, with entrance fee of JPY112,800 on top of tuition of JPY390,000.

There were 61 Polytechnic Centers JEED also operated in 2013, where they admit both unemployed and employed for short-term courses. Junior high and high school graduates gain professional skills in general course, in minimum 2,800 hours in two years, and 1,400 hours in one year. The prefectures budget and designate the fee of enrollment.

Persons with disabilities are admitted to state accredited Polytechnic Schools for Persons with Disabilities, as of 2013 totaled to 13. The operation of two facilities appointed JEED, and prefectures were responsible to run 11. Aside from those 13, prefectures also managed 6 in the same year.

Job placement centers called Hello Work consult unemployed to promote themselves at job interviews and encourage them to apply for short term vocational training, offered by JEED for six month and by prefectures for six-to-12 months. 41,228 trainee admitted to those facilities and short term courses in FY 2012, while average of 80.8% of them were employed by the end of the fiscal year. There are contracted job training institutions, where 3 months' courses are offered to the unemployed without tuition and up to 300 hours of training.

== Administrator ==
In the strict definition of polytechnic schools, prefectures of Japan shall administer, Municipalities of Japan can establish them, but neither the Stare of Japan, Independent Administrative Institution, nor JEED (Note: JEED aka Japan Organization for Employment of the Elderly, Persons with Disabilities and Job Seekers (独立行政法人高齢・障害・求職者雇用支援機構) provides services for administration of elderly (高齢), Persons with Disabilities (障害) and Job Seekers (求職者) along with support for those employers in needs of job training (職業訓練) for their staff, consultation for employee education (従業員の能力開発に関する相談・援助) and applying for support and incentives for vocational training by employers for job seekers (求職者支援制度による職業訓練の実施). Applicable employee toward Japanese duel system (日本版デュアルシステム) including database for vocational training courses (職業訓練コース情報の検索) and support for women job seekers (女性の求職者).) Polytechnic Centers (高度ポリテクセンター) is among those to administer those tasks.

On the other hand, private entities supporting job seekers can install a vocational training facility for such accredited programs, as long as governors of prefectures authorize when such entities fulfill the criteria of ordinance of the Ministry of Health, Labour, and Welfare in Japan. In that case, with the exception of the restriction of the use of such public facilities names, it is allowed to name such facility a vocational skills development school. Strictly speaking, While some facility is nicknamed polytechnic college but provides Polytechnic School programs, the official name of either Polytec Center or polytechnic College is limited to apply for facilities adminited by another JEED vocational training section or Polytechnic Centers (ja:職業能力開発促進センター).

== Japan's human resources development policy ==
Among the departments of Ministry of Health, Labour and Welfare (MHLW), Human Resources Development Bureau is in charge of vocational training as defined in "The mission, realizing social development through individual skills development" policy in Reference section, the White Paper, Ministry of Health, Labour and Welfare (厚生労働白書) for the fiscal year 2016 (Heisei 28). The Bureau focused on vocational training programs for human resource to train skills and give knowledge, to answer as well as sustain the manufacturing industry, a leading industry in Japan. The Bureau also expanded the focus on supplying productive labour forces as defined in "Policy Information—Human Resources Development." for those markets with expected intensive demands in the care and welfare for elderly and young children, as well as for intelligence technology.

=== Structure and Measures ===
The government of Japan and Ministry of Health, Labour, and Welfare overviewed the administration of human resources development in "the 8th Basic Plan for Human Resources Development", which was updated to "the 9th Basic Plan for Human Resources Development".

The implement was divided roughly into three categories; "Developing and improvement of vocational abilities," "Vocational ability evaluation and promotion of trade skills" with "International cooperation". The Bureau surveys human resources development measured by fiscal year.

Information on the policy is presented in detail as chapter 6, Structure of Human Resources Development Measures, and seven measures to implement the plan for:

1. Overview of HRD Administration
2. Vocational Training
3. Support for the working career formation
4. Provision against young people
5. Job Card System
6. Vocational ability evaluation and promoting trade skills
7. Technical Intern Training Program and 8 International cooperation

== Certificate systems for skills ==
While graduates of vocational schools/colleges will receive graduation certificates, there is not a full system to issue them diploma which both Semmonshi and kōdo-Semmonshi are given as academic degree. In May 1963 when they selected national team to attend the 12th WorldSkills Competition in Ireland (第12回技能五輪国際大会 (Dai 12-kai Ginō gorin kokusai taikai)), the first National Skills Competition of Japan (技能五輪全国大会 (Ginō Gorin zenkoku taikai)) was head in Tokyo by MHLW. The competitors are nominated through local chapters of the Vocational Ability Development Association and other recommenders, who are 23 years old or younger. As of 2017, entrants will compete with their skills in six categories, and the results are hoped to appeal their ability and excellence to those industries for machine, metal working, electronics, construction, service and fashion, and IT.

The competition had been held in Tokyo and Chiba prefecture till 1990, and since 1991 and the 29th competition, Aichi prefecture became the host for the event co-sponsored by the local government and the Japan Vocational Ability Development Association (JAVADA, Chuō Shokugyō Kaihatsu kyōkai (ja:中央職業開発協会)), a Special Civil Corporation under the jurisdiction of Human Resources Development Bureau (MHLW). Later on, the regulation changed to involve other prefectures as the host. The year before the international competition, the national competition is doubled to top the selection procedures for the national team.

Youth under 20 years of age are eligible to enter two separate national competitions. The first is Youth Competition for Monozukuri (Jakunen monozukuri kyōgi taikai (ja:若年者ものづくり競技大会)), also sponsored by JAVADA since August 2005. The second is open for a student at a technical high school and the upper secondary school, specialized course (ja:専門高等学校 senmon kōtō gakkō) in their own national monozukuri contest for high school students (kōkōsē monozukuri kontesuto zenkoku taikai (高校生ものづくりコンテスト全国大会)), nicknamed Koshien for Work skills (ものづくり甲子園), organized by the National Association of Principals of Technical Senior High Schools (ja:全国工業高等学校長協会) under the jurisdiction of MEXT (Ministry of Education, Culture, Sports, Science and Technology). Those studying at standard high schools with integrated course (ja:総合学科 sōgō gakka) are also invited to enter at that competition.

For physically handicapped students, they have the Abilympics, or the Ability Olympics (ja:全国障害者技能競技大会 Zenkoku shōgaisha ginō kyōgi taikai) sponsored by the Japan Organization for Employment of the Elderly, Persons with Disabilities and Job Seekers (JEED, Kōrē shōgai kyūshokusha koyō sien kikō (独立行政法人高齢・障害・求職者雇用支援機構)). There are chances to proceed and participate in the International Abilympics (IA) every four year organized by the International Abilympic Federation.

MHLW sets a policy to "visualize graduates' abilities" with the National Trade Skills Testing System for Shokugyo kaihatsu gakko graduates aiming the manufacturing industry. Those aiming at service industries including fashion, hair dressing and curinary business, they will take national tests and receive certificates as a proof of their skills in each profession. Model cases have been sought since 2013, for example sales staff in retail sectors as in major department stores. Another challenge for the MLHW to target is to provide instructors for education services at private preparatory schools, and the scheme was expected to start in the following fiscal years.

=== Diploma for vocational skills ===
To contrast, the doplima system of Japan, or an academic degree, is governed by the Ministry of Education, Culture, Sports, Science and Technology, aiming originally to improve the reputation of a vocational school graduate, and to promote lifelong learning. Diploma will be issued to those who had completed a particular specialized course successfully designed for two years' study. A vocational school, or one that Ministry categorises either a "Semmon-gakkō" (専門学校) (Note: A Semmon-gakkō is equivalent to ISCED-5B level. There are over 200,000 students accredited as Semmonshi annually.) which means a "professional training college, post-secondary course", and a "Senshū-gakkō" (専修学校), a "specialized training college, general course". (Note: Certifying a successful Senshū-gakkō graduate a deploma was legislated in the supplement 1, Ministry of Health, Labour, and Welfare (Monbu kagakushō kokuji dai 139-gō (文部科学省告示第百三十九号)) dated 9 September 2005 (Heisei 17).) Sōichi Tanaka, then the head of the Lifelong Learning Policy Bureau (Shōgai gakushū seisaku-kyoku), MEXT, sealed and published the Act 17–349 on 9 September 2005 to Mayors, the heads of Board of Education in each prefecture, as well as the presidents of national universities offering Senshu gakkō (文科生第349号 平成17年9月9日 各都道府県知事, 各都道府県教育委員会, 専修学校を置く各国立大学法人学長殿, 文部科学省 田中壮一郎.). (Note: At a Semmon-gakkō, the requirement is that you study more than two years successfully to receive a Diploma (専門士, Semmonshi), a specialist or an expert in Japanese. Whereas, an academic Diploma (高度専門士, kōdo-Semmonshi) will be issued when you have completed successfully at a particular specialized course with four-years' requirement at a Senshū-gakkō. A successful graduate of a Semmon-gakkō with mandagory four years' study will also be qualified for advanced academic diploma.)

== History ==
- 1947 – Employment Security Law was enacted, and vocational training center was defined in Article 27.
- 1949 – Employment Security Law revised to publicize vocational training centers.
- 1958 – Employment Security Law (1958) was enacted, and the general vocational training center was defined in Article 5.
- 1969 – Vocational Training Law was enacted, and the special vocational training school was defined in Article 15. Prefectures of Japan were able to set up advanced vocational training schools as defined in Article 16.
- 1978 – Vocational Training Law was revised, and special vocational training school and advanced vocational training school was turned into vocational training school as defined in paragraph (1) of Article 14.
- 1993 – Vocational training school became Polytechnic school defined in Paragraph (i) of Article 15-6 of Human Resources Development Promotion Law.

== Varied names among prefectures ==
While there are 166 prefectural polytechnic schools all over Japan, they are named in different format as follows. The majority of those are called "xy college", while there are no regulating laws or regulations for colleges.

=== Polytechnic schools ===
By prefectures Advanced technical college (高等技術専門校, Kōtō gijutsu senmonkō):

- Aichi: Facilities at Okazaki, Ichinomiya, Yogyo (ceramic industry), Takahama, Higashi-mikawa
- Aomori: Facilities at Aomori, Hirosaki
- Chiba: Facilities at Abiko, Asahi, Funabashi, Ichihara, Ichikawa, Tōgane. Shōgaisha (Disabled)
- Ehime: Facilities at Imabari, Matsuyama, Niihama, Uwajima
- Fukuoka: Facilities at Fukuoka City, Fukuoka Shōgaisha (Disabled), Kokura, Kotake, Kurume, Ōmuta, Tagawa, Tobata
- Gifu: A facility at Minamikoma-gun called Kyōnan, with another with varied name "International TAKUMI Academy" at Minokamo
- Hiroshima: Facilities at Hiroshima, Kure, Fukuyama, Miyoshi, Hiroshima Shōgaisha Nōryoku Kaihatsukō. Kenritsu Gijutsu Tanki Daigakkō (県立技術短期大学校)
- Iwate: Facilities at Miyako, Ninohe, Senmaya. Sangyō Gijutsu Tanki Daigakkō at Mizusawa
- Kagoshima: Facilities at Fukiage, Miyahojō, Aira, Kanoya, Kagoshima Shōgaisha Shokugyō Nōryoku Kaihatsukō (for disabled)
- Kumamoto: A facility at Kumamoto
- Kyōto: Facilities at Fukuchiyama, Higashiyama-ku (for pottery). Two facilities for disabled, Jōyō Shōgaisha and Kyōto Shōgaisha (disabled)
- Miyagi: Facilities at Ishinomaki, Kesennuma, Ōsaki, Sendai, Shiroishi
- Nagasaki: A facility at Nagasaki
- Nara: Facilities at Shiki District, Nara
- Ōita: Facility at Ōita, Ōita
- Okayama: Facilities at Nanbu, Hokubu, Hokubu Mimasaka Branch
- Saitama: Facilities in Chichibu, Kasukabe, Kawaguchi, Kawagoe, Kumagaya, Saitama and the headquarter in Ageo
- Shiga: Nicknamed techno college and facilities at Maibara (Maibara Techno College), Kusatsu (Kusatsu Techno College)
- Yamanashi: Kyōnan (峡南高等技術専門校) facility at Fujikawa cho, Minamikoma-gun (南巨摩郡富士川町)

Other names

- Academy of industrial technology (産業技術専門学院, Sangyō gijutsu senmon gakuin) – Fukui, Ibaraki, Wakayama
- Advanced engineering school (高等技術学校, Kōtō gijutsu gakkō) – Kagawa, Kōchi Mie
- Advanced industrial technology school (高等産業技術学校, Kōtō sangyō gijutsugakkō) – Yamaguchi
- Advanced institute of technology (高等技術専門学院, Kōtō gijutsu gakuin) – nicknamed college of technology (技術大学校) in Hokkaidō and Hyōgo
- Advanced technic school (高等職業技術校, Kōtō shokugyō gijutsukō) – Kanagawa
- Advanced technology school (高等技術校, Kōtō gijutsukō) – Shimane nicknamed Techno School
- Advanced vocational technology college (高等職業技術専門校, Kōtō shokugyō gijutsu senmonkō) – Ōsaka
- Bamboo craft and vocational training support center (竹工芸・訓練支援センター, Takekōgei kunren shiensentā) – Ōita
- Career center (キャリアアップセンター, Kyaria appu sentā) – Chiba
- Labor Relations and Women Employment Center (労政・女性就業センター, Rōsei josei shūgyō sentā) – Okinawa
- Industrial Human Resources Development Center (産業人材育成センター, Sangyō Jinzai Ikusei Sentā) – Tottori, at both Kurayoshi and Yonago
- Industrial technological college (産業技術専門校, Sangyō gijutsu senmonkō) – Gunma, Ishikawa, Miyazaki, Tochigi nicknamed industrial tech university (産業技術大学校, Sangyō gijutsu daigakkō)
- Institute of technology (工科学院, Kōka gakuin) – Aomori*Polytechnic school (職業能力開発校, Shokugyō nōryoku kaihatsukō) – Fukushima, Gifu, Okinawa
- Saga prefecture industrial technology college (佐賀県立産業技術学院, Saga kenritsu sangyō gijutsu gakuin) – Saga
- Technic college (総合職業技術校, Sōgō shokugyō gijutsukō) – Kanagawa nicknamed Kana Tech College
- Technological college (技術専門校, Gijutsu senmonkō) – Akita, Nagano, Shizuoka (nicknamed Techno College)
- Technological school (テクノスクール, tekuno sukūru) – Niigata, Tokushima
- Technology speciality institute (技術専門学院, Gijutsu senmon gakuin) – Toyama
- Vocational skills development center (職業能力開発センター, Shokugyō nōryoku kaihatsu sentā) – Iwate, Saitama, Tochigi, Tōkyō, Yamagata
- Vocational skills development institute (職業能力開発専門校, Shokugyō nōryoku kaihatsu senmonkō) – Yamagata
- Vocational skills development school (職業訓練校, Shokugyō kunrenkō) – Shizuoka
- Woodwork school (木工芸術スクール, Mokkō geijutsu sukūru) – Gifu

== Polytechnic schools by municipalities ==
There is one municipality administered polytechnic school in 2009 (Heisei 21), Yokohama Central Polytechnic School in Yokohama City, Kanagawa prefecture.

== Accredited private vocational training institutions ==
There are private institutions for vocational training and education throughout Japan, including the following.

- Instrument and Technical Polytechnic School – SANKO Control, SANKO Group Co., Ltd.
- Politechnic School Mokushō-juku (Vocational Training Corporations Mokushō-juku Vocational Education Association)
- Toyota Industrial Academy (Toyota)
- ONTEX Technical School (ONTEX INC)
- Japan Men's Beauty College (General Corporate Judicial Person Japan Men's Beauty Association)

== See also ==
- Vocational education
- List of Polytechnic schools
- Polytechnic schools for persons with disabilities
- Public Polytechnic institutions
