= David Day (Canadian author) =

Canadian author and poet

David Day (born October 1947) is a Canadian author and poet. He is best known for his books on J. R. R. Tolkien's Middle-earth. Day has published 46 books that have sold over 3 million copies.

== Early life ==
David Day was born and raised in Victoria on Vancouver Island, Canada. His father worked as chief fireman for area military bases. Day was editor of his high school's newspaper, and also contributed high school sports columns to the Victoria Daily Times, graduating from Victoria High School in 1966. After finishing high school, Day worked as a logger for five years on Vancouver Island before graduating in 1976 from the University of Victoria.

== Career ==
Day has published over 46 books of poetry, natural history, ecology, mythology, fantasy and children's literature. Day has been a columnist for Punch. He is best known for his books on the life and works of J. R. R. Tolkien.

In 2015, Day received a Distinguished Alumni Award from the University of Victoria.

=== Works on Tolkien ===
Day has published at least 15 books pertaining to Middle-earth, the world created by Tolkien. His first book, A Tolkien Bestiary, released in 1979, is an illustrated reference book on Middle-earth's fauna, flora and people. The book has been translated in 20 languages and reprinted numerous times since. The Dutch version reached the best-seller list.

The Tolkien family's publishers, HarperCollins, commissioned Day to write The Hobbit Companion, but dropped the book when Christopher Tolkien objected and threatened a lawsuit. Day was forced into bankruptcy by the protracted legal battle. He later found another publisher for the book, and the rewritten version was approved by the Tolkien estate. With the release of The Lord of the Rings: The Rings of Power series, Day's 2019 An Encyclopedia of Tolkien debuted on the Toronto Star's list of bestselling books in Canada on October 12, 2022. The 2025 A Dictionary of Tolkien Deluxe Edition debuted on the Associated Press list of best-sellers in the US at number 12.

=== Other books ===
Day's first book of poetry, The Cowichan, was based on a journal he kept during his logging years. He collaborated with Japanese artist Warabe Aska on three children's books, writing poems to accompany Aska's illustrations.

Day explored his theory that Alice's Adventures in Wonderland was written in mathematical code in his book, Alice's Adventures in Wonderland: Decoded, based on 18 years of research studying more than 1,000 different editions of Carroll's book.

== Reception ==
Time magazine and The Observer named Day's The Doomsday Book of Animals the critics' book of the year in 1981.

Colin Tudge, writing in New Scientist reviewed The Doomsday Book of Animals, writing:

The fate of D. maximus provides one of the most poignant case-histories among the three hundred extinctions taking place over a mere three centuries that David Day describes in his outstanding The Doomsday Book of Animals.

A review in Quill & Quire wrote of Nevermore:

Best known as the author of the Doomsday Book of Animals, poet and naturalist David Day returns to the subject of extinction with a frankly unclassifiable volume that combines primary texts, prose, and poetry. Taking the form of a 24-hour meditative vigil of the kind practiced by the Coptic Orthodox Church, each section in the book is devoted to a species of animal that has gone extinct during the time that homo sapiens has walked the earth. ... Nevermore is one of the most original and striking books of the year.

== Books ==
- The Cowichan. Oolichan Books, 1975
- Many Voices. North Vancouver, 1977
- The Burroughs Bestiary. UK: New English Library, 1978
- A Tolkien Bestiary. London: Chancellor Press, 1979
- The Scarlet Coat Serial. Canada: Press Porcepic, 1981
- The Doomsday Book of Animals. New York: Viking Press, 1981
- The Animals Within. Canada: Penumbra Press, 1984
- Castles. New York: Bantam Books, 1984
- Gothic. Canada: Exile Editions, 1986
- The Emperors Panda. Canada: McClelland & Stewart, 1986
- The Whale War. UK: Routledge, 1987
- The Eco Wars. London: Harrap, 1989
- The Swan Children. London: Piccadilly Press, 1989
- The Encyclopedia of Vanished Species. UK: Universal Books, 1989
- Noah's Choice. London: Viking Penguin, 1990
- True Tales of Environmental Madness. London: Pelham Books, 1990
- The Sleeper. London: Piccadilly Press, 1990
- Tolkien: The Illustrated Encyclopedia. London: Mitchell Beazley, 1991
- The Walking Catfish. New York: Macmillan, 1991
- Aska's Animals. Canada: DoubleDay, 1991
- Aska's Birds. Canada: DoubleDay, 1992
- A-Z of Tolkien. London: Mandarin, 1993
- Tippu. London: Piccadilly Press, 1993
- King of the Woods. London: Anderson Press, 1993
- Aska's Sea Creatures. Canada: DoubleDay, 1994
- The Complete Rhinoceros. London: EIA Books, 1994
- Tolkien's Ring. London: Harper Collins, 1994
- The Quest for King Arthur. London: De Agostini, 1996
- The Visions and Revelations of St Louis De Metis. Canada: Thistledown Press, 1997
- Just Say No To Family Values and Other Rants, Howls, and Moans. Toronto: Exile Editions, 1997
- The Hobbit Companion. London: Pavilion Books, 1997
- The World of Tolkien: Mythological Sources of Lord of the Rings. London: Mitchell Beazley, 2003
- Nevermore: A Book of Hours. Toronto: Quattro Books, 2012
- A Dictionary of Tolkien. London: Cassell, 2013
- Alice's Adventures in Wonderland: Decoded. Toronto: Doubleday, 2015
- An Atlas of Tolkien. London: Cassell, 2015
- The Battles of Tolkien. London: Cassell, 2016
- The Heroes of Tolkien. London: Cassell, 2017
- The Dark Powers of Tolkien. London: Cassell, 2018
- The Hobbits of Tolkien. London: Cassell, 2019
- The Illustrated World of Tolkien. San Diego: Thunder Bay Press, 2019
- The Ring Legends of Tolkien. London: Cassell, 2020
- An Encyclopedia of Tolkien: The history and mythology that inspired Tolkien's world. San Diego: Canterbury Classics, 2019
- The Illustrated World of Tolkien: The Second Age. Thunder Bay Press, 2023
- A Dictionary of Tolkien Deluxe Edition. Thunder Bay Press, 2025

== Personal life ==
Day is married to Róisín Magill and has a daughter. As of 2020, he lives in Toronto.
