= Muteking, The Dashing Warrior =

Japanese anime television series

- とんでも戦士ムテキング
- Genre: Science fiction, Comedy
- Created by: Tatsunoko Production Planning Office
- Directed by: Seitaro Hara
- Music by: Koba Hayashi
- Opening theme: "Rora Hiro Muteking" by Ichirou Mizuki and Feeling Free
- Ending theme: "Oretacha Kuradako Brothers" by Koorogi '73
- Country of origin: Japan
- Original language: Japanese
- No. of episodes: 56

Production
- Executive producer: Kenji Yoshida
- Producers: Ippei Kuri; Tomoyuki Miyata
- Production companies: Tatsunoko Production; Fuji Television

Original release
- Network: FNS (Fuji TV)
- Release: September 7, 1980 – September 27, 1981

Related
- Muteking the Dancing Hero

Muteking, The Dashing Warrior (とんでも戦士ムテキング, Tondemo Senshi Muteking) is an anime television series produced by Tatsunoko Productions that ran on Fuji Television and its affiliates from September 7, 1980, to September 27, 1981.

A reboot of the series titled Muteking the Dancing Hero aired in 2021.

== Plot ==
Twelve-year-old Rin Yuki loyally supported his father when the world laughed at the scientist for saying that Earth was about to be face an alien invasion. But Rin did not expect to become personally involved—until he met Takoro, the strange young "deputy sheriff" from another world who was on the trail of notorious space criminals. There were only four Kurodako Brothers, but they plotted to use their alien science and natural shapeshifting powers to become the secret masters of Earth. With Takoro's help, Rin became the mighty superhero, Muteking, to foil their schemes.

== Release ==
The series was televised in Italy under the title of simply Muteking.

An English dub of episode one was also made, apparently in an unsuccessful attempt to sell the series to the United States. In this one-episode dubbed version (which has been posted on YouTube in three parts), Rin Yuki is named "Scooter Loon," and his father is renamed "Linus Loon."

== Cast ==
- Rin Yuki: Kazuhiko Inoue
- Takoro: Yumiko Uzaki
- Dr. Dankichi Yuki: Isamu Tanonaka
- Koharu Yuki: Kazue Komiya
- Sonny Yuki: Rokuro Naya
- Mitchi: Takako Tsutsui
- Nubon: Takemi Nakamura
- Takokichi: Toru Ohira
- Takomaru: Shigeru Tsuji
- Takosaku: Shin Aomori
- Takomi: Makoto Kōsaka

== Episode list ==
No.	Title	Directed by (Note: Information is taken from the ending credits of each episode.)	Written by	Original release date
1	"Dispatch! Muteking"; Transliteration: "Tonde Shutsudō! Mutekingu" (Japanese: とんで出動！ ムテキング)	Kōichi Mashimo	Kazuo Satō	September 7, 1980
2	"The Mysterious Strap Huge Mess"; Transliteration: "Fushigi na Tsurikawa Dai Sōdō" (Japanese: 不思議なつり革大騒動)	Hiroshi Suzuki	Akiyoshi Sakai	September 14, 1980
3	"Eat Again Before and After Meals"; Transliteration: "Shokuzen Shokugo ni Mata Tabero" (Japanese: 食前食後にまた食べろ)	Shin'ya Sadamitsu; Yutaka Kagawa	Akiyoshi Sakai	September 21, 1980
4	"Conquer with Disinformation!"; Transliteration: "Nise Jōhō de Seifuku da!" (Japanese: ニセ情報で征服だ！)	Tomoyasu Masago; Yoshizō Tsuda	Takeshi Shudō	September 28, 1980
5	"Large Waves and Small Waves Flood!"; Transliteration: "Ōnami Konami de Dai Kōzui!" (Japanese: 大波小波で大洪水！)	Bondo Eiju; Hidehito Ueda	Yū Yamamoto	October 5, 1980
6	"Weird Personal Consultation"; Transliteration: "Henteko Mi no Ue Sōdan" (Japanese: ヘンテコ身の上相談)	Shōhei Ishida	Akiyoshi Sakai	October 12, 1980
7	"Bullshit Baseball! 0 to 0"; Transliteration: "Detarame Yakyū! Rei Tai Rei" (Japanese: でたらめ野球！ 0対0)	Shin'ya Sadamitsu; Kenjirō Yoshida	Haruya Yamazaki	October 19, 1980
8	"It's a Big Jungle Panic!"; Transliteration: "Janguru Dai Panikku da!" (Japanese: ジャングル大パニックだ！)	Tomoyasu Masago; Yutaka Kagawa	Akiyoshi Sakai	October 26, 1980
9	"Play Play Play with Everyone!"; Transliteration: "Asobe Asobe Minna de Asobe!" (Japanese: 遊べ遊べみんなで遊べ！)	Shin'ya Sadamitsu; Yoshizō Tsuda	Haruya Yamazaki	November 2, 1980
10	"Is the Octopus the Great Demon King of the Universe?"; Transliteration: "Tako wa Uchū no Dai Maō?" (Japanese: タコは宇宙の大魔王？)	Kazuo Yamazaki; Kenjirō Yoshida	Takeshi Shudō	November 9, 1980
11	"Surprise! The Earth is Full of Robots"; Transliteration: "Odoroki! Chikyū wa Robotto-darake" (Japanese: 驚き！ 地球はロボットだらけ)	Hidehito Ueda	Akiyoshi Sakai	November 16, 1980
12	"It Came Out! The Great Phantom of the Kurodako Mansion"; Transliteration: "Deta! Kurodako Yashiki no Dai Kaijin" (Japanese: 出た！ クロダコ屋敷の大怪人)	Masayuki Hayashi; Yutaka Kagawa	Masayuki Hayashi	November 23, 1980
13	"Everyone Dig Here! A Treasure Sleeps"; Transliteration: "Minna Koko Hore! Takara ga Nemuru" (Japanese: みんなここ掘れ！ 宝が眠る)	Hidehito Ueda	Akiyoshi Sakai	November 30, 1980
14	"New Hero? Female Muteking"; Transliteration: "Shin Hīrō? Josei Mutekingu" (Japanese: 新ヒーロー？ 女性ムテキング)	Kōichi Mashimo; Hiroshi Suzuki	Yū Yamamoto	December 7, 1980
15	"Everyone Hibernate with Flowing Snow"; Transliteration: "Yuki ya Konkon Minna de Tōmin" (Japanese: 雪やコンコンみんなで冬眠)	Kazuo Yamazaki; Kenjirō Yoshida	Haruya Yamazaki	December 14, 1980
16	"New Theory! Human Eevaporation If Wet In the Rain"; Transliteration: "Shinsetsu! Ame ni Nurereba Ningen Jōhatsu" (Japanese: 新説！ 雨にぬれれば人間蒸発)	Shin'ya Sadamitsu; Yoshizō Tsuda	Ryōko Takagi	December 21, 1980
17	"What Happens to Humans If They Enjoy Themselves In a Car?"; Transliteration: "Kuruma de Raku Surya Ningen Dō Naru?" (Japanese: 車で楽すりゃ人間どうなる？)	Katsumi Endō; Kenjirō Yoshida	Akiyoshi Sakai	December 28, 1980
18	"Festival Heave-ho! Everyone Dance"; Transliteration: "Omatsuri Wasshoi! Minna Odore" (Japanese: お祭りワッショイ！ みな踊れ)	Tomoyasu Masago; Yutaka Kagawa	Akiyoshi Sakai	January 4, 1981
19	"Kurodako's Perfect Helmet"; Transliteration: "Kurodako no Manten Herumetto" (Japanese: クロダコの満点ヘルメット)	Kazuo Yamazaki; Hidehito Ueda	Takeshi Shudō	January 11, 1981
20	"Popular Climax! Kurodako Sound"; Transliteration: "Ninki Zetchō! Kurodako Saundo" (Japanese: 人気絶頂！ クロダコサウンド)	Shin'ya Sadamitsu; Kunihiko Yuyama	Yū Yamamoto	January 18, 1981
21	"Lots of Laughs! Kurodako Large Circus"; Transliteration: "Bakushō! Kurodako Dai Sākasu" (Japanese: 爆笑！ クロダコ大サーカス)	Katsumi Endō; Kenjirō Yoshida	Haruya Yamazaki	January 25, 1981
22	"Maze! All Adults and Children are Lost"; Transliteration: "Meiro! Otona mo Kodomo mo Mina Maigo" (Japanese: 迷路！ 大人も子供もみな迷子)	Katsumi Endō; Yutaka Kagawa	Akiyoshi Sakai	February 1, 1981
23	"Octopus Star Stone That Opens Good Luck"; Transliteration: "Kōun o Hiraku Tako Sei no Ishi" (Japanese: 幸運をひらくタコ星の石)	Yoshizō Tsuda	Ryōko Takagi	February 8, 1981
24	"Takoro's Guts Marathon Man"; Transliteration: "Takorō no Konjō Marason Man" (Japanese: タコローの根性マラソンマン)	Asuma Kusa; Kenjirō Yoshida	Haruya Yamazaki	February 15, 1981
25	"Winds and Clouds! Great Duel on Mount Eagle"; Transliteration: "Fūun! Īguru Yama no Dai Kettō" (Japanese: 風雲！ イーグル山の大決闘)	Shin'ya Sadamitsu; Hidehito Ueda	Haruya Yamazaki	February 22, 1981
26	"It's a Break, Hot Saucer"; Transliteration: "Zekkō da yo Hottoke Sōsā" (Japanese: 絶交だよホットケソーサー)	Kazuo Yamazaki; Shōhei Ishida	Takeshi Shudō	March 1, 1981
27	"Realization! Kurodako's Utopia"; Transliteration: "Jitsugen! Kurodako no Yūtopia" (Japanese: 実現！ クロダコのユートピア)	Kazuo Yamazaki	Akiyoshi Sakai	March 8, 1981
28	"Welcome! Kurodako's Ryugu Castle"; Transliteration: "Yōkoso! Kurodako Ryūgū Jō" (Japanese: ようこそ！ クロダコ竜宮城)	Masayuki Hayashi; Yutaka Kagawa	Yū Yamamoto	March 15, 1981
29	"Success! Kurodako's Conquest of the Moon"; Transliteration: "Seikō! Kurodako no Getsumen Seifuku" (Japanese: 成功！ クロダコの月面征服)	Hidehito Ueda	Haruya Yamazaki	March 22, 1981
30	"Goodbye Mitchie"; Transliteration: "Sayonara Mitchī" (Japanese: さよならミッチー)	Katsumi Endō; Kenjirō Yoshida	Mariko Fujita	March 29, 1981
31	"Ah Sad Love! Takomi's Pure Love"; Transliteration: "Ā Hiren! Takomi no Jun'ai" (Japanese: ああ悲恋！ タコミの純愛)	Shin'ya Sadamitsu; Shōhei Ishida	Takeshi Shudō	April 5, 1981
32	"Unable to Recover?! Kurodako's Complete Defeat"; Transliteration: "Saiki Funō?! Kurodako Kanpai" (Japanese: 再起不能?! クロダコ完敗)	Kazuo Yamazaki	Yū Yamamoto	April 12, 1981
33	"Let's Go to Japan! Great Migration"; Transliteration: "Iku zo Nippon! Dai Idō" (Japanese: いくぞ日本！ 大移動)	Yutaka Kagawa	Yū Yamamoto	April 19, 1981
34	"Silver Family Big Race"; Transliteration: "Hakugin Famirī Dai Rēsu" (Japanese: 白銀ファミリー大レース)	Shin'ya Sadamitsu; Hidehito Ueda	Yū Yamamoto	April 26, 1981
35	"Life or Death?! KO Ranch Death Fight"; Transliteration: "Sei ka Shi ka?! Kē Ō Bokujō no Shitō" (Japanese: 生か死か?! KO牧場の死闘)	Katsumi Endō; Yoshizō Tsuda	Haruya Yamazaki	May 3, 1981
36	"Thrill! Horror Truck Bastard"; Transliteration: "Suriru! Kyōfu no Torakku Yarō" (Japanese: スリル！ 恐怖のトラック野郎)	Kazuo Yamazaki	Haruya Yamazaki	May 10, 1981
37	"Open Dignifiedly! Takoro Police"; Transliteration: "Dōdō Ōpun! Takorō Keisatsu" (Japanese: 堂々オープン！ タコロー警察)	Masakazu Higuchi	Kazuo Satō	May 17, 1981
38	"No No No! Takoro's Mom"; Transliteration: "Ya Ya Ya! Takorō no Okāsan" (Japanese: ややや！ タコローのお母さん)	Masakazu Higuchi; Yutaka Kagawa	Yū Yamamoto	May 24, 1981
39	"Large Profit?! Kurodako Tour Boat"; Transliteration: "Ōmōke?! Kurodako no Yūransen" (Japanese: 大もうけ?! クロダコの遊覧船)	Masakazu Higuchi	Yū Yamamoto	May 31, 1981
40	"Fighting Portable Shrine Great Melee"; Transliteration: "Kenka Omikoshi Dai Konsen" (Japanese: ケンカおみこし大混戦)	Shin'ya Sadamitsu; Yoshizō Tsuda	Yū Yamamoto	June 7, 1981
41	"Fly Fly Balloon! Big Race"; Transliteration: "Tobe Tobe Kikyū! Dai Rēsu" (Japanese: 飛べ飛べ気球！ 大レース)	Hidehito Ueda; Yutaka Kagawa	Mariko Fujita	June 14, 1981
42	"Great Hit? Takoro Picture Story Show"; Transliteration: "Bakauke? Takorō Kamishibai" (Japanese: バカうけ？ タコロー紙芝居)	Kazuo Yamazaki; Masakazu Higuchi	Haruya Yamazaki	June 21, 1981
43	"Bloom In the Sky! Humanity Fireworks"; Transliteration: "Ōzora ni Sake! Ninjō Hanabi" (Japanese: 大空に咲け！ 人情花火)	Yutaka Kagawa	Ryōko Takagi	June 28, 1981
44	"Great Sale! Kurodako Mansion"; Transliteration: "Dai Tokubai! Kurodako Manshon" (Japanese: 大特売！ クロダコマンション)	Masakazu Higuchi	Takeshi Shudō	July 5, 1981
45	"Tears! Retirement of Downtown Train"; Transliteration: "Namida! Shitamachi Densha no Intai" (Japanese: 涙！ 下町電車の引退)	Shōhei Ishida	Yū Yamamoto	July 12, 1981
46	"Brilliant! Kurodako's Summer Vacation"; Transliteration: "Karei! Kurodako no Natsuyasumi" (Japanese: 華麗！ クロダコの夏休み)	Masakazu Higuchi	Mariko Fujita	July 19, 1981
47	"Angler Takoro"; Transliteration: "Tsurishi Takorō" (Japanese: 釣り師タコロー)	Yoshizō Tsuda	Haruya Yamazaki	July 26, 1981
48	"The Panda Has Disappeared! Invisibility Cloak"; Transliteration: "Panda ga Kieta! Tōmei Manto" (Japanese: パンダが消えた！ 透明マント)	Hidehito Ueda; Yutaka Kagawa	Masaru Takesue	August 1, 1981
49	"Don't Turn Off the Lights In the Playhouse"; Transliteration: "Shibaigoya no Hi o Kesu na" (Japanese: 芝居小屋の灯を消すな)	Shin'ya Sadamitsu; Yoshizō Tsuda	Ryōko Takagi	August 9, 1981
50	"Impressed! Kurodako Tears of Parents"; Transliteration: "Kandō! Kurodako Namida no Oyakōkō" (Japanese: 感動！ クロダコ涙の親孝行)	Shin'ya Sadamitsu	Kazuo Satō	August 16, 1981
51	"First Love! Takosak's Pure Story"; Transliteration: "Hatsukoi! Takosaku Junjō Monogatari" (Japanese: 初恋！ タコサク純情物語)	Yutaka Kagawa	Akiyoshi Sakai	August 23, 1981
52	"Reconciliation?! Kurodako's SOS"; Transliteration: "Wakai?! Kurodako no Esu Ō Esu" (Japanese: 和解?! クロダコのSOS)	Masakazu Higuchi; Shōhei Ishida	Yū Yamamoto	August 30, 1981
53	"How to Win the Muteking Game"; Transliteration: "Mutekingēmu Hisshō-hō" (Japanese: ムテキンゲーム必勝法)	Shin'ya Sadamitsu; Yoshizō Tsuda	Takeshi Shudō	September 6, 1981
54	"Rescue Squad Storm Showdown!"; Transliteration: "Resukyū-tai Arashi no Taiketsu!" (Japanese: レスキュー隊嵐の対決！)	Katsumi Endō; Yutaka Kagawa	Haruya Yamazaki	September 13, 1981
55	"Great Chase! Telepote Tube"; Transliteration: "Dai Tsuiseki! Terepote Chūbu" (Japanese: 大追跡！ テレポテチューブ)	Kazuo Yamazaki; Yoshizō Tsuda	Yū Yamamoto	September 20, 1981
56	"This Is the Last Sight! Great Decisive Battle"; Transliteration: "Kore de Miosame! Dai Kessen" (Japanese: これで見おさめ！ 大決戦)	Shin'ya Sadamitsu	Haruya Yamazaki	September 27, 1981
