= Vatican Miracle Examiner =

Japanese light novel series by Rin Fujiki and THORES Shibamoto

- The cover of the original 2007 printing of the first light novel

バチカン奇跡調査官 (Bachikan Kiseki Chōsakan)
- Genre: Mystery
- Light novel
- Written by: Rin Fujiki
- Illustrated by: THORES Shibamoto
- Published by: Kadokawa Shoten
- Imprint: Horror Bunko
- Original run: December 10, 2007 – present
- Volumes: 25
- Manga
- Written by: Eiji Kaneda
- Published by: Kadokawa Shoten
- Magazine: Comic Kai
- Original run: January 24, 2012 – January 24, 2013
- Volumes: 2
- Manga
- Written by: Anjue Hino
- Published by: Media Factory
- Magazine: Monthly Comic Gene
- Original run: August 15, 2016 – December 15, 2018
- Volumes: 5
- Anime television series
- Directed by: Yoshitomo Yonetani
- Produced by: Yūji Matsukur; Junichirō Tamura; Yukiko Katō
- Written by: Seishi Minakami
- Music by: Yoshiaki Fujisawa
- Studio: J.C.Staff
- Licensed by: AUS: Madman Entertainment; NA: Sentai Filmworks; UK: MVM Films
- Original network: WOWOW, Tokyo MX, AT-X, Sun TV, KBS, TV Aichi, BS11, TVQ
- Original run: July 7, 2017 – September 22, 2017
- Episodes: 12 + OVA

Vatican Miracle Examiner (Japanese: バチカン奇跡調査官, Hepburn: Bachikan Kiseki Chōsakan) is a Japanese light novel series written by Rin Fujiki and illustrated by THORES Shibamoto. The series began in 2007. A manga adaptation by Eiji Kaneda ran from 2012 to 2014, and a second one, illustrated by Anjue Hino, began serialization in 2016. An anime television series adaptation by J.C.Staff aired from July 7 to September 22, 2017.

== Plot ==
The story follows two men, Hiraga Josef Kō and Roberto Nicholas, who work for the mysterious organization The Seat of the Saints (聖徒の座, Seito no Za), an element of the Vatican dedicated to investigating alleged miracles; during their work, they usually find themselves involved in mysterious murder cases, which they often end up investigating.

Eventually they cross paths with Galdoune, an ancient organization that secretly aims to control the Vatican and since the Middle Ages is involved in obscure alchemic and scientific experiments in search of a way to reach immortality.

== Characters ==
Joseph Kō Hiraga (平賀・ヨゼフ・庚, Hiraga Yozefu Kō)
Voiced by: Nobuhiko Okamoto
A young Japanese priest of the Vatican in charge of investigating alleged miracles all around the World. He has an exceptional talent for math and science, which assist him in his role of investigating miracles using a scientific approach.
Roberto Nicholas (ロベルト・ニコラス, Nikorasu Roberuto)
Voiced by: Junichi Suwabe
Joseph's partner in investigations, he's an Italian priest with a great knowledge for syncretism and theology. He is passionate about ancient knowledge and books, and is well versed in ancient and foreign languages (he knows Greek, Latin, Arabic, Hebrew, English and German). It is later revealed that he was orphaned at the age of twelve, after his violent father killed his mother and fled.
Archbishop Saul (サウロ大司教, Sauro Daishikyō)
Voiced by: Masashi Ebara
The chief of the Seat of the Saints, and a member of the Congregation for the Causes of Saints, he is one of the most powerful men in the Vatican. He has a high respect for the dedication of Joseph and Roberto, to the point of protecting them if necessary from disciplinary sanctions.
Lauren Di Luca (ローレン･ディルーカ, Rōren Dirūka)
Voiced by: Sōma Saitō
A young Italian hacker known worldwide, he is a genius with an IQ above 200 who was involved in terrorist attacks and other crimes around the world. After his arrest by the Italian government, the Vatican obtained custody of him in order to make use of his exceptional talents. After losing a game with Joseph he agreed to cooperate with him and Roberto, providing them with support and consulting from within his cell. Due to his lack of morals and empathy, he's forced to wear a anklet filled with poison that will kill him immediately if he tries to contravene Vatican orders.
Bill Suskins (ビル･サスキンス, Biru Sasukinsu)
Voiced by: Hiroki Yasumoto
An FBI agent who went in Africa to solve the mysterious death of his friend Amy Boness. During his mission he met Joseph and Roberto, with whom he successfully resolved the case, without however capturing the culprit Julia. Suskins and the two priests meet again in Italy, where they cooperate once again to stop Julia's plans.
Priest Julia (ジュリア司祭, Juria Shisai)
Voiced by: Kōji Yusa
An apparently benevolent missionary of an African church, Joseph and Roberto meet him while investigating an alleged miracle in his mission. However, he's subsequently discovered to be a sinister Machiavellian leader of Galdoune.
Ryōta Hiraga (平賀良太, Hiraga Ryōta)
Voiced by: Tsubasa Yonaga
Joseph's young brother who has a rare form of bone cancer that is slowly killing him. He uses a wheelchair and lives in a special medical center in Germany for children with terminal illnesses. Joseph often suffers from visions or nightmares involving him. Later in the story it's revealed that since he was little he has been able to see the Angels of Death.

== Media ==
=== Light novels ===
Rin Fujiki published the first novel in the series, with cover illustrations by THORES Shibamoto, in 2007. It and the second novel, which was released in 2009, were both published by Kadokawa Shoten. The series was transferred to Kadokawa's Horror Bunko imprint in 2010, which republished the first two novels before releasing the third in 2011.

==== Volumes ====
★= Short Story

No.	Title	Japanese release date	Japanese ISBN
1	The Black Academy; Kuro no Gakuin (黒の学院)	December 10, 2007; December 25, 2010	978-4-04-873823-1; ISBN 978-4-04-449802-3
2	Satan's Judgment; Satan no Sabaki (サタンの裁き)	August 27, 2009; January 25, 2011	978-4-04-873977-1; ISBN 978-4-04-449803-0
3	Golden Darkness; Yami no Kogane (闇の黄金)	February 25, 2011	978-4-04-873977-1
4	Master of the Millennium Kingdom / Sound of Millennium; Sen'nen'ōkoku no Shirabe (千年王国のしらべ)	July 23, 2011	978-4-04-449805-4
5	Blood, Rose, and Cross; Chi to Bara to Jūjika (血と薔薇と十字架)	October 25, 2011	978-4-04-100034-2
6	Laplace's Demon; Rapurasu no Akuma (ラプラスの悪魔)	May 25, 2012	978-4-04-100206-3
7	★The Game of Angels and Demons; Tenshi to Akuma no Gēmu (天使と悪魔のゲーム)	December 25, 2012	978-4-04-100629-0
8	Our Lady of the End / Dei Genitrix of the End; Shūmatsu no Seibo (終末の聖母)	October 25, 2013	978-4-04-101050-1
9	Ice Wolf Swallowed the Moon; Tsuki o Nomu Kōri Ōkami (月を呑む氷狼)	September 25, 2014	978-4-04-101969-6
10	The Apostles Without Original Sin; Genzai Naki Shito-tachi (原罪無き使徒達)	March 25, 2015	978-4-04-101968-9
11	★The Imprisoned Detective / The Prison Cell Detective / Detective in the Prison; Dokubō no Tantei (独房の探偵)	June 20, 2015	978-4-04-102937-4
12	The Demons' Feast / The Party of Demons; Akuma-tachi no Utage (悪魔達の宴)	October 24, 2015	978-4-04-102938-1
13	Solomon's Descendants; Soromon no Matsuei (ソロモンの末裔)	February 25, 2016	978-4-04-102939-8
14	Cross of Paradise; Rakuen no Jūjika (楽園の十字架)	December 22, 2016	978-4-04-104985-3
15	★Zombie Murder Case; Zonbi Satsujin Jiken (ゾンビ殺人事件)	February 25, 2017	978-4-04-104987-7
16	Twenty Seven Elephants; Ni Jū Nana-tō no Zō (二十七頭の象)	July 25, 2017	978-4-04-104988-4
17	Bell of Gévaudan; Jevu~ōdan no Kane (ジェヴォーダンの鐘)	April 25, 2018	978-4-04-105975-3
18	★Intersezione Di Un Angelo E Un Angelo Caduto / Eng: Intersection Of An Angel And A Fallen Angel; Tenshi to Duò Tenshi no Kōsaten (天使と堕天使の交差点)	November 22, 2018	978-4-04-107448-0
19	Adam’s Temptation; Adamu no Yūwaku (アダムの誘惑)	July 24, 2019	978-4-04-107447-3
20	Koning Der Koningen / Eng: King of Kings; Ō no Nakanoō (王の中の王)	August 25, 2020	978-4-04-109792-2
21	★Three Mysterious Fugues; Mittsu no Nazo no Fūga (三つの謎のフーガ)	December 24, 2020	978-4-04-110842-0
22	The Place Where the Angels Lead; Tenshi no Mure no Michibiku Sho (天使の群れの導く処)	July 16, 2021	978-4-04-111515-2
23	★Secret Garden; Himitsunohanazono (秘密の花園)	September 21, 2022	978-4-04-111441-4
24	Prophecy of the Sword in the Stone; Seiken no Yogen (聖剣の預言)	August 24, 2023	978-4-04-113396-5
25	The Monster of Waivstan; Ueibusutan no Kaibutsu (ウエイブスタンの怪物)	August 23, 2024	978-4-04-113397-2

Editor Note: Due to the Kadokawa websites being down, volumes 14 and on will be cited through Amazon.co.jp until it's possible to cite them from Kadokawa.

=== Manga ===
A manga adaptation by Eiji Kaneda launched in Kadokawa's Comic Kai magazine on January 24, 2012. The series was compiled into two volumes, published on February 20, 2013 (ISBN 978-4-04-120572-3), and January 24, 2014 (ISBN 978-4-04-120973-8).

Anjue Hino began serializing a second manga in the September 2016 issue of Media Factory's shōjo manga magazine Monthly Comic Gene on August 12, 2016.

=== Anime ===
An anime adaptation was announced in the December 2016 issue of Monthly Comic Gene on November 15, 2016. The adaptation was a television series, and aired from July 7 to September 22, 2017. The series ran for 12 episodes and an original video animation will also be released. Yoshitomo Yonetani directed at J.C.Staff and written by Seishi Minakami. Character designs is by Kazunori Iwakura. Screen Mode performed the opening theme "Mysterium". Nobuhiko Okamoto performed the ending theme. Sentai Filmworks have licensed the anime and streamed on Amazon Prime Video. MVM Films has licensed the series in the UK.

No.	Title	Original release date
1	"Through God's Succor, My Eyes Are Opened" "Omo no sasae ni yorite ga wa mezameru" (主の支えによりて我は目覚める)	July 7, 2017
Priests Hiraga Joseph Kou and Roberto Nicholas are sent to San Rosario's abbey in Northern Mexico to investigate the reported immaculate conception of a young nun, sister Dolores, taking with them half of a tally counter with the letters "RICH". On the night they arrive, one of the abbey's priests, Father Klaus, is found stoned to death. Shortly thereafter, an apparent miracle occurs when a stone statue of the Virgin Mary appears to shed tears.
2	"The Endless Unease of Existence" "Sonzai no kagiri naki fuan" (存在のかぎりなき不安)	July 14, 2017
The Miracle Examiners solve the mystery of the statue's tears, and learn of the founding of the abbey by the highly revered and compassionate Father Michael Brown who rescued orphaned children after the war in Europe. However two new murders occur, Father Francesco is strangled to death and Father Joseph is crucified upside-down. Hiraga and Roberto think that there is a war between good and evil part being played out in the abbey and the answers lie in the abbey's ancient history.
3	"Secrets of the Gods and the Beast of 666" "Kamigami no himitsu to 666 no shishi" (神々の秘密と666の獣)	July 21, 2017
Hiraga and Roberto find dark secrets about the abbey's past and the other half of the tally counter which, together with their piece, spells "HEINRICH". They encounter Mary Brown, a woman with a two headed doll, claiming that it is the result of a birth witnessed by Klaus, Josef, Leon and Johannes who said that it was Lord Janus reborn. She claims her father is the director of San Rosario, Michael Brown who descended from the skies in the Rusburg. Joseph deduces that Michael Brown was one of a group of escaping Nazis that landed in the zeppelin Rusburg after World War II. Meanwhile, Lauren di Luca back in the Vatican provides them with information that many of the wealthy Heinrich Charity executives are also Vatican VIPs involved in the Vatican Bank and will also have influence at the next papal enclave. Later, they come across a séance and are attacked by someone wearing a skeleton mask.
4	"Even So, I Still Believe in the Lord God" "Soredemo nao, waga wa kami o shinzu" (それでも尚、我は神を信ず)	July 28, 2017
Hiraga and Roberto’s assailant is shot dead by an unknown person. The Examiners discover through Father Brown's diary that he was in fact Heinrich Muller and part of a strategy in the final days of World War II was to take young Nazis to a new land for the birth of a Fourth Reich. They then find a huge underground facility, used for manufacturing drugs which fund the Heinrich Charity, with the money then laundered through the Vatican Bank. They come across a ceremony in which Thomas Simeon, the surviving son of Mary Brown is proclaimed as the "new messiah", born from the preserved seed of Hitler himself. Thomas orders the Examiners to be captured and sacrificed, but Hiraga showers him with Holy Water which begins to burn his skin. Then, a series of explosions destroy the facility. The following day, as Hiraga confesses to Roberto that he actually threw sulfuric acid on Thomas Simeon, the hideously burned Thomas is shot by Father McGee. McGee reveals that he is an operative of the Zion’s Law organization, dedicated to the elimination of the remnants of the Nazi regime. Back in the Vatican, the Examiners are commended for their work in exposing evil within the church.
5	"The Game of Angels and Demons" "Tenshi to akuma no gēmu" (天使と悪魔のゲーム)	August 4, 2017
When an unrepentant Lauren di Luca is imprisoned for the crime of trafficking in bacteriological weapons, he agrees to talk to Priest Joseph Kou Hiraga who proposes a game, where if he wins, Lauren will consider believing in God. Joseph tells Lauren the story of a man he met, who as a boy was granted 1,000 wishes by his demonic father, but whenever he used the wishes they backfired, including his subconscious wish for love. However, the man eventually won against the devil and did find love, using the infernal gift for a good purpose and finding happiness. At the completion of the story, Joseph wins the game, and Lauren begins to change his attitude.
6	"God Bestows Upon Us All His Revelations" "Omo wa arayuru keiji o tare tamau" (主はあらゆる啓示を垂れ給う)	August 11, 2017
Joseph and Roberto travel to St. Carmel's church in Central Africa to investigate the body of clairvoyant Father John Jordan which shows no signs of decay after eighteen months. FBI agent Bill Suskins is also there investigating the mysterious death of his friend Amy Boness. The initial analysis of the body seems to support the miracle. Joseph is fascinated by the holy spirit of the church's main priest Julia Micheal Borge and assists him in his daily clinic treating the sick. Meanwhile, Roberto researches Jordan's last prophecy which appears to predict his own imminent death.
7	"Those Branded with a Curse" "Noroi no rakuin o osare shisha" (呪いの烙印を押されし者)	August 18, 2017
Robertos' death is predicted to occur during the upcoming local Shin-Shin festival, so he tirelessly continues his research in the church's vast library dating from the 16th Century to explain the miracle and the prophecy. He finds books on Dianoia, Aion and instructions for a Satanic ritual to control a corpse. Just as he discovers the secrets to creating an incorruptible body, he is bitten by a black mamba snake. Hallucinating, he finds himself in Satan’s Court where his faith is tested, but he survives, regaining consciousness in hospital, saved by a serum Joseph had requested from Lauren. On the night of the Shin-Shin festival, they find Father Sampson beheaded.
8	"Only Through Death Can We Full Comprehend Rebirth into Eternal Life" "Shinu koto niyotte nomi, eien no seimei ni yomigaeru koto o fukaku satore" (死ぬことによってのみ、永遠の生命によみがえることを深く悟れ)	August 25, 2017
Joseph confides in Julia that, although he believes in the miracle of Father John Jordan’s incorruptible body, Roberto disagrees. At a televised hearing into John Jordan's miracles Roberto proceeds to discredit the prophesies, saying that they only roughly coincide with real events and that the sponsor, Kid Goldman, killed Father Sampson. He claims that John Jordan is a murderer, whose real name is Bruno Puccini, Roberto's biological father who murdered his mother Naomi. Then, with the FBI agent Suskins, they find someone who appears to be Julia murdered by the servant Oriola, and a hidden room of horrors beneath the church linking the recent events to the French House of Bourbona and the Galdoune secret society.
9	"The Decapitating Clown and the Tale of Solomon" "Kubikiri dōkeshi to Soromon no dōwa" (首切り道化師とソロモンの童話)	September 1, 2017
In 1985, a group of young people have a terrifying experience in Tuscany while investigating the old and obscure legend of the Headhunter Clown. Joseph and Roberto are sent to re-examine a reported daily miracle at St. Eligius church in Tuscany because the head priest Father Trones has not endorsed the examination request. They arrive and find symbols of the Motley Clown that supposedly haunts the woods around the village. They hear and witness the sound and light of the miracle, but are unable to record the colourful lights which everyone perceives differently. Meanwhile, Roberto finds two almost identical books in the library, mirror images of each other, but with slight differences in the text. That night, with everyone locked in their rooms, an unknown pale-skinned teenage boy is murdered and Father Trones is missing.
10	"The Ghosts of Past Appeared" "Arawareshi kako no Bōrei" (現れし過去の亡霊)	September 8, 2017
Joseph and Roberto's investigations of the murder in the church lead to a connection with the events in 1985, and they watch a videotape taken at the time. Meanwhile, Suskins and the Italian Inspector Bafi arrive as part of an investigation of counterfeit US currency, and reveal that Julia Micheal Borge may still be alive, and that he, the Headhunter Clown and Galdoune may be connected. After Father Trones is found frozen to death, Joseph, Roberto, Suskins and Bafi head into the forest, searching for the Headhunter Clown.
11	"The Gold of the Darkness; I am with the Lord" "Yami no ōgon, ga, omo totomoni" (闇の黄金、我、主とともに)	September 15, 2017
Following the same route of the unfortunate 1985 expedition, Joseph, Roberto, Suskins and Bafi find huge underground facility. They discover that the Galdoune complex is a former gold mine of the House of Bourbona. The mine has been worked for generations by slave labor who have never seen the outside world, and is now used to print counterfeit currency. Suddenly, they are captured by the Galdoune, led by Julia dressed as the Headhunter Clown. He offers the Examiners inducements and an opportunity to join Galdoune, but they refuse and are imprisoned with Suskins and Bafi in the Room of Death. The four manage to escape using the text Roberto recalls from the twin books. They expose the daily miracle as a fake created by Father Trones and the Galdoune money printing operation and cocaine distribution center, but fail to capture Julia.
12	"Sinfonia" "Shinfonia" (シンフォニア)	September 22, 2017
Ryota narrates the story from his early childhood when the Angels of Death, appearing as three hooded men, would visit him each time someone close to him was at the point of death. He used a wheelchair due to a rare form of bone cancer that was slowly killing him, and hospitalized in a special center in Germany for children with terminal illnesses. Ryota recalls the boy ve met there, Joseph Lucolas Bartrich, who was influenced by Roberto Nicholas and who also gave him the strength to overcome his fear and despair. Lucolas encouraged Ryota to seek his own sacrament. As Ryota's own death approaches, Julia arrives and provides a life-saving medication. Following his miraculous recovery, Ryota realizes that his sacrament is to deliver prayers from the dying to those still living.

== Reception ==
The series has sold over 950,000 copies in Japan.

== See also ==
- Miracles - an American television series with similar elements.
