= Nobuhiko Okamoto =

Japanese voice actor (born 1986)

- 岡本 信彦
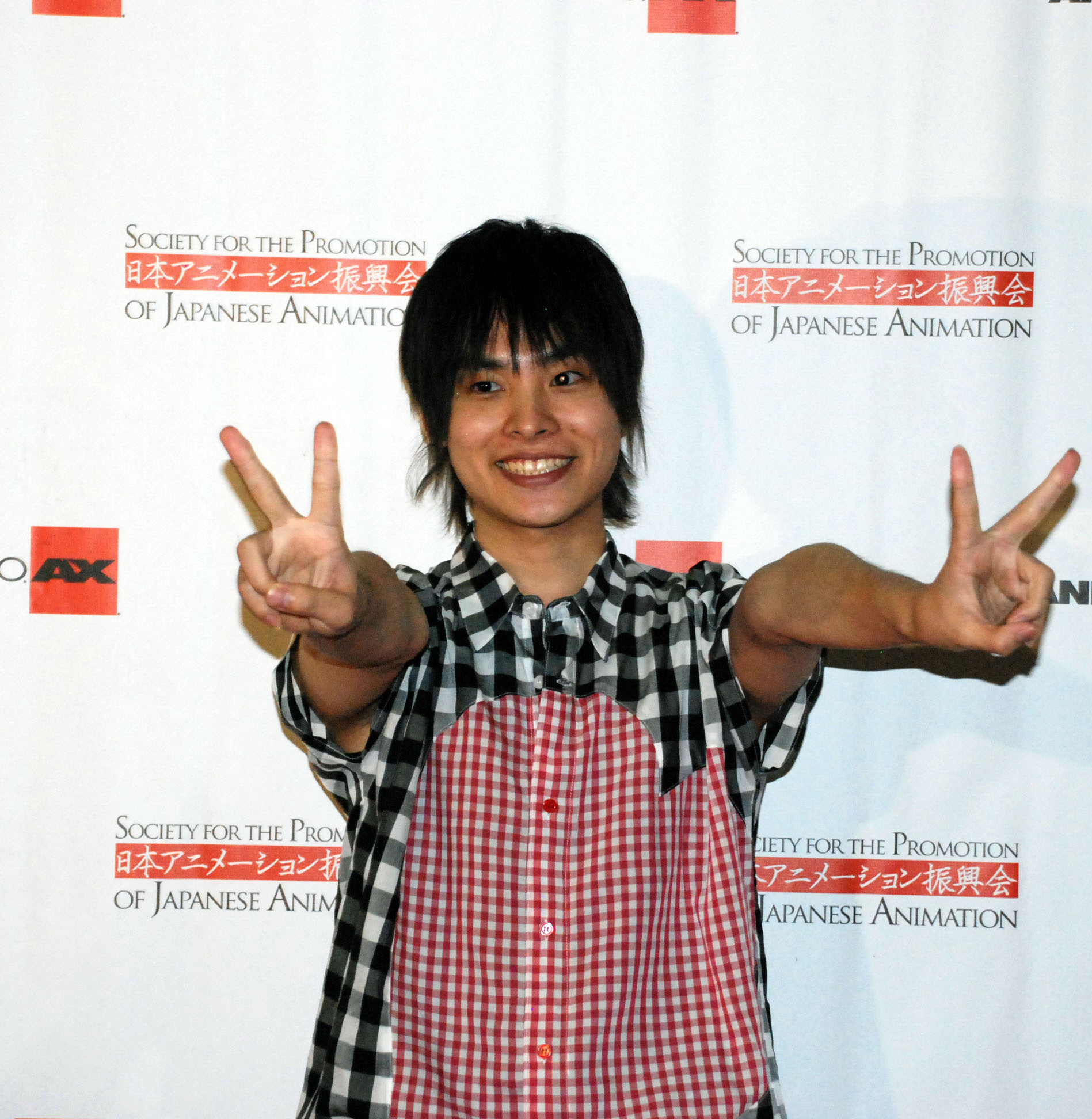
- Nobuhiko Okamoto at Anime Expo 2012
- Born: October 24, 1986 (age 40); Tokyo, Japan
- Occupations: Voice actor; singer
- Years active: 2006–present
- Agent: Raccoon Dog
- Height: 168 cm (5 ft 6 in)
- Spouse: Asuka Ōgame (m. 2020)
- Musical career
- Genres: J-Pop; Anison
- Instrument: Vocals
- Years active: 2012–present
- Labels: Lantis; Kiramune; Bandai Visual
- Website: www.raccoon-dog.co.jp/talent/m01-okamoto.html

Nobuhiko Okamoto (岡本 信彦, Okamoto Nobuhiko; born October 24, 1986) is a Japanese voice actor and singer affiliated with Raccoon Dog. He won the Best New Actor Award at the 3rd Seiyu Awards and Best Supporting Actor Award at the 5th Seiyu Awards.

== Voice acting career ==
In an interview held at the Anime Expo, when answering what inspired him to become a voice actor, Okamoto mentioned that he has always been a big fan of Slam Dunk and thought the character Rukawa was really cool, so he wanted to be like him.

At the 3rd Seiyu Awards, he won the award for best rookie actor for his roles of Accelerator in A Certain Magical Index, Shin Kanzato in Persona: Trinity Soul and Ryuji Kuhoin in Kure-nai, when he graduated from university.

At the 5th Seiyu Awards, he won the award for best actor in a supporting role for his roles of Takumi Usui in Maid Sama!, Eiji Niizuma in Bakuman and Accelerator in A Certain Magical Index.

He has voiced Yū Nishinoya in Haikyu!!, Katsuki Bakugo in My Hero Academia, Rin Okumura in Blue Exorcist, Ghiaccio in JoJo's Bizarre Adventure, Karma Akabane in Assassination Classroom, Isaac "Zack" Foster in Angels of Death, Yoichi Saotome in Seraph of the End, Louis Napoleon in Captain Tsubasa, Khun Aguero Agnes in Tower of God, Genya Shinazugawa in Demon Slayer: Kimetsu no Yaiba, Ryo Kurokiba in Food Wars: Shokugeki no Soma, Garfiel Tinsel in Re:Zero − Starting Life in Another World, Bete Loga in Is It Wrong to Try to Pick Up Girls in a Dungeon?, Natsuki Seba in Sakamoto Days, Kanta Higurashi in Zom 100: Bucket List of the Dead, Liebe in Black Clover, and Obi in Snow White with the Red Hair. Known for his high-energy, explosive performances, Okamoto is also recognized for voicing Sasaki Ganryu in the video game Onimusha: Way of the Sword. Okamoto established and transferred to a new voice talent agency Raccoon Dog on April 1, 2022, following the closure of Pro-Fit on March 31.

== Music career ==
Okamoto has voiced many roles, including his involvement in character CDs and insert songs (soundtracks) for the anime. On his 25th birthday, he announced his singing debut for the year 2012. On May 23, he released his first EP, Palette which reached number 9 on the weekly Oricon chart. On June 5, 2013, he released his second EP, Enjoy Full. On March 19, 2014, he released his first single, "Shunkan Beat" (瞬間BEAT).

== Personal life ==
He is skilled at playing shogi, having the Shogi Certification in 3rd Class. He appeared in several shogi events on Niconico and appeared in a Pokémon game event on Niconico as well. He also loves to play badminton. He's also the host of a radio program about gaming called RADIO 4Gamer from 2010 to 2015. Later, the program changed its name to RADIO 4Gamer Tap and continued on with Okamoto still being the host. The show was available on YouTube channel "4GamerSP." In his spare time he plays video games.

On March 21, 2020, Okamoto revealed that he is married to Asuka Ōgame after Shūkan Bunshun reported allegations of him having an extramarital affair. He apologized for his actions.

== Filmography ==
=== Television animation ===
Year	Title	Role	Notes	Ref.
2006	Ghost Hunt	John Brown		
2006	Mamotte! Lollipop	Gomez		
2007	Bakugan Battle Brawlers	Kōsuke	Ep. 9	
2007	Bakugan Battle Brawlers	Tatsuya	Ep. 5	
2007	Engage Planet Kiss Dum	Katou	Ep. 16	
2007	Kono Aozora ni Yakusoku o: Yōkoso Tsugumi Ryō e	Hiro Tsujisaki		
2007	Myself; Yourself	Youta	Ep. 13	
2007	Nodame Cantabile	Kanei	Ep. 5	
2007	Potemayo	Yasumi Natsu		
2007	Sky Girls	Hiroharu Kurosawa	Ep. 16	
2007	Sola	Yorito Morimiya		
2007	Toward the Terra	Serge Starjon		
2007	You're Under Arrest: Full Throttle	Sudou		
2007	Shugo Chara!	Musashi		
2008	Shugo Chara!! Doki—	Musashi		
2008	A Certain Magical Index	Accelerator		
2008	Kure-nai	Ryūji Kuhōin		
2008	Kyōran Kazoku Nikki	Takashi		
2008	Legends of the Dark King: A Fist of the North Star Story	Young Toki	Ep. 7	
2008	Nabari no Ou	Gau Meguro		
2008	Noramimi	Kabayuki	Eps. 3–4, 7	
2008	Noramimi 2	Kabayuki		
2008	Onegai My Melody: Kirara	Duck-kun		
2008	Persona: Trinity Soul	Shin Kanzato		
2008	Sekirei	Haruka Shigi		
2008	Toradora!	Kōta Tomiie	Eps. 12, 14, 25	
2009	Akikan!	Gorō Amaji		
2009	Battle Spirits: Shounen Gekiha Dan	Hideto Suzuri	Ep. 1	
2009	Chrome Shelled Regios	Layfon Alseif		
2009	GA Geijutsuka Art Design Class	Wakaumi		
2009	Guin Saga	Oro		
2009	Hatsukoi Limited	Haruto Terai		
2009	Jewelpet	Kuranosuke Hinata		
2009	Samurai Harem	Yoichi Karasuma		
2009	Slayers Evolution-R	Abel		
2009	The Sacred Blacksmith	Luke Ainsworth		
2009	Yumeiro Pâtissière	Makoto Kashino		
2009	Metal Fight Beyblade	Teru Saotome		
2010	Metal Fight Beyblade Explosion	Teru Saotome		
2010	A Certain Magical Index II	Accelerator		
2010	Baka to Test to Shokanju	Genji Hiraga	Ep. 11	
2010	Bleach	Narunosuke		
2010	Durarara!!	Ryo Takiguchi		
2010	Academy Apocalypse: Highschool of the Dead	Takuzo	Ep. 3	
2010	Maid Sama!	Takumi Usui		
2010	Mayoi Neko Overrun!	Takumi Tsuzuki		
2010	Night Raid 1931	Ichinose		
2010	Nura: Rise of the Yokai Clan	Inugami		
2010	Okamikakushi	Issei Tsumuhana		
2010	Ōkami-san and her Seven Companions	Hansel		
2010	Otome Yōkai Zakuro	Mamezō		
2010	Shiki	Tōru Mutō		
2010	Shukufuku no Campanella	Leicester Maycraft		
2010	The Legend of the Legendary Heroes	Lear Rinkal		
2010	Uragiri wa Boku no Namae o Shitteiru	Katsumi Tōma		
2010	Yumeiro Pâtissière SP Professional	Makoto Kashino, Cassie		
2010	Bakuman.	Eiji Niizuma		
2011	Bakuman. 2	Eiji Niizuma		
2011	Blue Exorcist	Rin Okumura		
2011	A Dark Rabbit Has Seven Lives	Serge Entolio		
2011	Baka to Test to Shokanju Ni!	Genji Hiraga		
2011	Beelzebub	Miki Hisaya		
2011	Ben-To	Tomoaki Yamahara	Ep. 3	
2011	Freezing	Arthur Climpton		
2011	Guilty Crown	Kenji Kido		
2011	Kamisama Dolls	Kyōhei Kuga		
2011	Last Exile: Fam, The Silver Wing	Johann, Vimal	Eps. 12–13	
2011	Maria†Holic: Alive	Rindo		
2011	Pretty Rhythm Aurora Dream	Wataru		
2011	Sacred Seven	Night Kijima		
2011	Sekai-ichi Hatsukoi	Shōta Kisa		
2011	Sekai-ichi Hatsukoi Season 2	Shōta Kisa		
2011	Tiger & Bunny	Ivan Karelin / Origami Cyclone		
2011	Yumekui Merry	Yumeji Fujiwara		
2011	Kimi to Boku	Fuyuki Matsuoka		
2012	Kimi to Boku 2	Fuyuki Matsuoka		
2012	Aesthetica of a Rogue Hero	Akatsuki Ōsawa		
2012	Bakuman. 3	Eiji Niizuma		
2012	Metal Fight Beyblade Zero-G	Zero Kurogane		
2012	Code:Breaker	Rei Ōgami/Code:06		
2012	Daily Lives of High School Boys	Mitsuo		
2012	Inazuma Eleven GO 2: Chrono Stone	Saryuu Evan		
2012	Kamisama Kiss	Mizuki		
2012	Place to Place	Io Otonashi		
2012	Pretty Rhythm Dear My Future	Wataru		
2012	Sakamichi no Apollon	Seiji Matsuoka		
2012	World War Blue	Gear		
2013	Ace of Diamond	Ryōsuke Kominato		
2013	Arata: The Legend	Arata Hinohara		
2013	A Certain Scientific Railgun S	Accelerator		
2013	Brothers Conflict	Hikaru Asahina		
2013	Cuticle Detective Inaba	Kenmochi		
2013	Devil Survivor 2 The Animation	Daichi Shijima		
2013	Hakkenden: Eight Dogs of the East	Murasame		
2013	Hakkenden: Eight Dogs of the East 2	Murasame		
2013	Karneval	Azana		
2013	Photo Kano	Takashi Azuma		
2013	Star Blazers 2199	Alter	(ep 9), Tasuke Tokugawa (eps 2, 7)	
2013	Unbreakable Machine-Doll	Loki		
2013	Wanna be the Strongest in the World	Chairman		
2013	Log Horizon	Karashin		
2014	Log Horizon 2	Karashin		
2014	Ace of Diamond	Ryōsuke Kominato		
2014	Black Butler: Book of Circus	Dagger		
2014	Captain Earth	Koichi Ban		
2014	Monthly Girls' Nozaki-kun	Mikoto "Mikorin" Mikoshiba		
2014	Hamatora	Seo		
2014	Re: Hamatora	Seo		
2014	When Supernatural Battles Became Commonplace	Jurai Andō		
2014	Kill la Kill	Shinjiro Nagita/Nui Harime's disguise	(ep 13)	
2014	Magical Warfare	Gekkō Nanase		
2014	World Trigger	Jun Arashiyama		
2014	Yona of the Dawn	Shin-Ah, Han-Dae, Abi		
2014	Haikyū!!	Yuu Nishinoya		
2015	Haikyū!! 2	Yuu Nishinoya		
2015	Kamisama Hajimemashita 2	Mizuki		
2015	Fafner in the Azure: Exodus	Jonathan Mitsuhiro Bertrand		
2015	Food Wars: Shokugeki no Soma	Ryou Kurokiba		
2015	Q Transformer: Saranaru Ninkimono e no Michi	Soundwave		
2015	Is It Wrong to Try to Pick Up Girls in a Dungeon?	Bete Loga		
2015	Seraph of the End	Yōichi Saotome		
2015	Seraph of the End: Battle in Nagoya	Yōichi Saotome		
2015	Snow White with the Red Hair	Obi		
2015	Ultimate Otaku Teacher	Kakitani		
2015	Star-Myu: High School Star Musical	Rui Tatsumi		
2015	Assassination Classroom	Karma Akabane		
2016	Assassination Classroom 2nd Season	Karma Akabane		
2016	Prince of Stride Alternative	Takeru Fujiwara		
2016	Haruchika	Kaiyū Hiyama		
2016	Snow White with the Red Hair 2	Obi		
2016	My Hero Academia	Katsuki Bakugo		
2016	Buddy Go	Hayate		
2016	Alderamin on the Sky	Ikuta Sorōku		
2016	First Love Monster	Kōta Shinohara		
2016	Cheer Boys!!	Kazuma Hashimoto		
2016	Momokuri	Shinya "Momo" Momotsuki		
2016	March Comes in like a Lion	Harunobu Nikaidō		
2016	Haikyuu!!: Karasuno Koukou vs Shiratorizawa Gakuen Koukou	Yuu Nishinoya		
2016	All Out!!	Atsushi Miyuki		
2016	Scared Rider Xechs	Rickenbacker		
2016	Food Wars! Shokugeki no Soma: The Second Plate	Ryō Kurokiba		
2017	Food Wars! Shokugeki no Soma: The Third Plate	Ryō Kurokiba		
2017	Altair: A Record of Battles	Silâh Ismail		
2017	Blue Exorcist: Kyoto Saga	Rin Okumura		
2017	Himouto Umaru-chan R	Kōichirō Ebina		
2017	The Dragon Dentist	Bell		
2017	Sword Oratoria	Bete Loga		
2017	Jūni Taisen	Usagi		
2017	Mahōjin Guru Guru	Raid	(ep 6, 8 – 11, 13 – 19, 21 – )	
2017	Monster Hunter Stories: Ride On	Debli		
2017	March Comes in like a Lion 2nd Season	Harunobu Nikaidou		
2017	Onihei	Chūgo Kimura		
2017	Pokémon: Sun and Moon	Glazio (Gladion)		
2017	Star-Myu: High School Star Musical 2	Rui Tatsumi		
2017	Vatican Miracle Examiner	Hiraga Josef Kō		
2017	Welcome to the Ballroom	Kiyoharu Hyōdō		
2017	Re:Creators	Shō Hakua		
2017	Dynamic Chord	Chiya Suzuno		
2017	My Hero Academia 2	Katsuki Bakugō		
2017	Katsugeki/Touken Ranbu	Hizamaru		
2018	Touken Ranbu: Hanamaru 2	Hizamaru		
2018	The Ryuo's Work Is Never Done!	Ayumu Kannabe		
2018	Hakyu Hoshin Engi	Ōtekun		
2018	My Hero Academia 3	Katsuki Bakugō		
2018	Nil Admirari no Tenbin: Teito Genwaku Kitan	Akira Kōgami		
2018	Magical Girl Site	Kaname Asagiri		
2018	Food Wars! Shokugeki no Soma: The Third Plate 2nd Cour	Ryō Kurokiba		
2018	Wotakoi: Love is Hard for Otaku	Ken, Nao's friend		
2018	Hanebado!	Kentarō Tachibana		
2018	Angels of Death	Isaac "Zack" Foster		
2018	Cells at Work!	Dendritic Cell		
2018	Phantom in the Twilight	Luke Bowen		
2018	A Certain Magical Index III	Accelerator		
2018	Teasing Master Takagi-san	Takao		
2019	Teasing Master Takagi-san 2	Takao		
2019	JoJo's Bizarre Adventure: Golden Wind	Ghiaccio		
2019	Meiji Tokyo Renka	Kyōka Izumi		
2019	Demon Slayer: Kimetsu no Yaiba	Genya Shinazugawa		
2019	Star-Myu: High School Star Musical 3	Rui Tatsumi		
2019	Food Wars! Shokugeki no Souma: The Fourth Plate	Ryou Kurokiba		
2019	RobiHachi	Hoshiro		
2019	Inazuma Eleven: Orion no Kokuin	Froy Girikanan		
2019	If It's for My Daughter, I'd Even Defeat a Demon Lord	Dale		
2019	Beastars	Kai	Jaguar (ep 9)	
2019	My Hero Academia 4	Katsuki Bakugō		
2019	True Cooking Master Boy	Tang San Jie		
2019	A Certain Scientific Accelerator	Accelerator		
2020	A Certain Scientific Railgun T	Accelerator		
2020	Sorcerous Stabber Orphen	Swain		
2020	Log Horizon: Destruction of the Round Table	Karashin		
2020	Haikyuu!!: To The Top	Yuu Nishinoya		
2020	Tower of God	Khun Aguero Agnes		
2020	Food Wars! Shokugeki no Soma: The Fifth Plate	Ryō Kurokiba		
2020	Re:Zero − Starting Life in Another World 2nd Season	Garfiel Tinsel		
2021	Bottom-tier Character Tomozaki	Shūji Nakamura		
2021	Dr. Ramune: Mysterious Disease Specialist	Nico		
2021	Horimiya	Kakeru Sengoku		
2021	True Cooking Master Boy Season 2	Tang San Jie		
2021	Black Clover	Liebe	preceded by Kenichirou Matsuda	
2021	Burning Kabaddi	Masato Ojo		
2021	Those Snow White Notes	Kaito Yaguchi		
2021	Ore, Tsushima	Cha		
2021	Edens Zero	Noah Glenfield		
2021	The Heike Story	Taira no Sukemori		
2021	Dragon Quest: The Adventure of Dai	Nova		
2021	My Hero Academia 5	Katsuki Bakugō		
2022	My Hero Academia 6	Katsuki Bakugō		
2022	Teasing Master Takagi-san 3	Takao		
2022	Salaryman's Club	Yukei Saruhashi		
2022	Shikimori's Not Just a Cutie	Inuzuka Shū		
2022	My Stepmom's Daughter Is My Ex	Kogure Kawanami		
2022	Tokyo Mew Mew New	Quiche		
2022	Uncle from Another World	Raiga		
2022	Vermeil in Gold	Iolite		
2022	Raven of the Inner Palace	Tankai		
2022	The Eminence in Shadow	Rex	Ep. 8	
2023	Revenger	Saimon Shishido		
2023	I Got a Cheat Skill in Another World and Became Unrivaled in the Real World, Too	Ryō Igarashi		
2023	Opus Colors	Daiki Yura		
2023	Dead Mount Death Play	Gōzaburō Arase		
2023	The Dangers in My Heart	Shō Adachi		
2023	Magical Destroyers	Adam		
2023	Why Raeliana Ended Up at the Duke's Mansion	Wade Davis		
2023	Horimiya: The Missing Pieces	Kakeru Sengoku		
2023	Am I Actually the Strongest?	Schneider Halfen		
2023	Sugar Apple Fairy Tale	Orland Langston		
2023	Frieren: Beyond Journey's End	Himmel		
2023	Tokyo Revengers: Tenjiku Arc	Haruchiyo Sanzu		
2023	Undead Unluck	Top		
2023	The Diary of Ochibi-san	Ozeni		
2023	Zom 100: Bucket List of the Dead	Kanta Higurashi		
2023–2024	Kamen Rider Gotchard	Nijigon		
2024	The Strongest Tank's Labyrinth Raids	Marius		
2024	Bottom-tier Character Tomozaki 2nd Stage	Shūji Nakamura		
2024	Ishura	Hidow the Clamp		
2024	Viral Hit	Toru Kaneko		
2024	My Hero Academia 7	Katsuki Bakugō		
2024	One Piece	S-Bear, Bartholomew Kuma (young)		
2024	Wind Breaker	Kaji Ren		
2024	Pseudo Harem	Eiji Kitahama		
2024	Quality Assurance in Another World	Suzuki		
2024	No Longer Allowed in Another World	Suzuki		
2024	Tower of God 2nd Season	Khun Aguero Agnis		
2024	Fairy Tail: 100 Years Quest	Ignia		
2024	Mayonaka Punch	Igito		
2024	I'll Become a Villainess Who Goes Down in History	Curtis Kenwood		
2024	Rurouni Kenshin: Kyoto Disturbance	Chō Sawagejō		
2025	Promise of Wizard	Shino		
2025	Sakamoto Days	Natsuki Seba		
2025	Your Forma	Fokine		
2025	Everyday Host	Senichi		
2025	The Unaware Atelier Master	Golnova		
2025	Captivated, by You	Akira Nikaidō		
2025	Pass the Monster Meat, Milady!	Mullan Sero		
2025	My Hero Academia: Final Season	Katsuki Bakugō		
2026	Dead Account	Soji Enishiro		
2026	High School! Kimengumi	Yō Nihiruda		
2026	Black Torch	Koga		
2026	The 100 Girlfriends Who Really, Really, Really, Really, Really Love You 3rd Season	Jesus Nakai	Ep. 4	
2026	Horror Collector	Blue Umbrella Man		
2026	Tougen Anki	Hagure Nekosaki		
2027	Bless	Ginga Yoyogi		
2027	Just Like Mona Lisa	TBA		
2027	Phantom Busters	Mogari Shishikuno		

=== Original video animation (OVA) ===
Year	Title	Role	Notes	Ref.
2009	Akikan!: Perfection!? The Hot Spring Panic	Gorō Amaji		
2010	Megane na Kanojo	Jun'ichi Kamiya		
2011	Air Gear: Break on the Sky	Itsuki Minami		
2011	Blue Exorcist: Runaway Kuro	Rin Okumura		
2011	Shukufuku no Campanella OVA	Leicester Maycraft		
2012	Code:Breaker	Rei Ōgami		
2012	Hanayaka Nari, Waga Ichizoku: Kinetograph	Masashi Miyanomori		
2013	Assassination Classroom	Akabane Karma		
2013	Brothers Conflict OVA 2	Hikaru Asahina		
2013	Kamisama Kiss	Mizuki		
2014–2015	Hybrid Child	Kotarō Izumi		
2016	Star-Myu: High School Star Musical	Rui Tatsumi		
2016	Kamisama Hajimemashita: Kako-hen	Mizuki		

=== Original net animation (ONA) ===
Year	Title	Role	Notes	Ref.
2015	Momokuri	Shinya Momotsuki (Momo)		
2016	Koro Sensei Quest	Karma Akabane		
2021	The Heike Story	Taira no Sukemori		
2021	Beyblade Burst Dynamite Battle	Phenomeno Payne		
2022	Tiger & Bunny 2	Ivan Karelin/Origami Cyclone		
2025	Disney Twisted-Wonderland: The Animation	Floyd Leech		
2026	Fool Night	Nishi		

=== Theatrical animation ===
Year	Title	Role	Notes	Ref.
2012	Blue Exorcist: The Movie	Rin Okumura		
2012	Tiger & Bunny: The Beginning	Ivan Karelin/Origami Cyclone		
2013	A Certain Magical Index: The Movie – The Miracle of Endymion	Accelerator		
2013	Patema Inverted	Age		
2014	Saint Seiya: Legend of Sanctuary	Andromeda Shun		
2014	Sekai-ichi Hatsukoi: Yokozawa Takafumi no Baai	Shōta Kisa		
2014	Tiger & Bunny: The Rising	Ivan Karelin/Origami Cyclone		
2015	Gekijōban Meiji Tokyo Renka: Yumihari no Serenade	Kyōka Izumi		
2016	Assassination Classroom the Movie: 365 Days	Karma Akabane		
2016	Koro-sensei Q!	Karma Akabane		
2018	My Hero Academia: Two Heroes	Katsuki Bakugō		
2019	My Hero Academia: Heroes Rising	Katsuki Bakugō		
2019	Fafner in the Azure: The Beyond	Chaos Partland		
2020	WAVE!! Surfing Yappe!!	Rindō Fuke		
2021	My Hero Academia: World Heroes' Mission	Katsuki Bakugō		
2022	Teasing Master Takagi-san: The Movie	Takao		
2022	Break of Dawn	Ginnosuke Tadokoro		
2023	Rakudai Majo: Fūka to Yami no Majo	Kai		
2023	Black Clover: Sword of the Wizard King	Liebe		
2024	Haikyu!! The Dumpster Battle	Yū Nishinoya		
2024	My Hero Academia: You're Next	Katsuki Bakugō		
2025	Demon Slayer: Kimetsu no Yaiba – The Movie: Infinity Castle	Genya Shinazugawa		
2025	Toi-san	Kiriya Numaoka		
2026	Assassination Classroom the Movie: Our Time	Karma Akabane		
2026	To You in the Beyond	Akimitsu Yano		

=== Drama CDs ===
Year	Title	Role	Notes	Ref.
2008	Nabari no Ou	Gau Meguro		
2009	Heaven's Memo Pad	Hitoshi Mukai		
2009	Rikei Danshi	Hazeru Mizunomoto		
2009	Barajou no Kiss ～rose 1～	Ninufa		
2009	Barajou no Kiss ～rose 2～	Ninufa		
2010	Yumeiro Patissiere	Makoto Kashino		
2011	Shukan Soine CD Series Vol.8 Ryo	Ryo		
2012	The Best Place Vol. 2 - First Time Body Temperature	Ryo Tachibana		
2012	Tonari no Kaibutsu-kun	Sasahara Sohei		
2013	Brothers Conflict Series 2 Vol. 4	Hikaru Asahina		
2014	Honeymoon Vol. 14	Ayumu Kaido		
2014	Ookami-kunchi: Wolves Brothers Home	Ookami Heat		
2014	Photograph Journey	Takara Yuzurihara		
2014	E:Robotts Model.917	Shinonome		
2018	Angels of Death Vol 1: Haunted House	Isaac "Zack" Foster		
2018	Angels of Death Vol 2: Deelinquent Academy	Isaac "Zack" Foster		
2019	Angels of Death Vol 3: Café	Isaac "Zack" Foster		
2020	A Certain Scientific Railgun	Accelerator		
2020	Lovesick Ellie	Omi		

=== Video games ===
Year	Title	Role	Notes	Ref.
2006	Granado Espada	Racel		
2009	Little Anchor	Yoshua Lineberger (ヨシュア・ラインベルカー)		
2010	NieR Replicant	Nier		
2010	Chaos Rings	Ayuta		
2010	Death Connection	Leonardo		
2011	Corpse Party: Book of Shadows	Tsukasa Mikuni		
2011	La storia della Arcana Famiglia	Ash		
2011	Meiji Tokyo Renka	Izumi Kyoka		
2011	Sleepy-time Boyfriend	Ryo		
2012	12 Ji no Kane no Cinderella ~Halloween Wedding~	Roy Difentarl		
2012	Be My Princess	Prince Wilfred Spencer		
2012	Black Wolves Saga	Pearl		
2012	Brothers Conflict: Passion Pink	Hikaru Asahina		
2012	Jyuzaengi Engetsu Sangokuden	Cho Hi		
2012	Lollipop Chainsaw	Swan and Killabilly		
2012	Mobile Suit Gundam: Extreme Vs. Full Boost	Leos Alloy		
2012	SD Gundam G Generation Overworld	Fon Spaak		
2012	Tokyo Babel	Uliel		
2013	2/2 Lover: Angels and Demons	Hinata, Setsuna		
2013	Hanasaku Manimani	Fujishige Takara		
2013	Hanayaka Nari, Waga Ichizoku Tasogare Polar Star	Masashi Miyanomori		
2013	Koibana Days	Araragi Tsukasa		
2013	Minus Eight	Maya Kazahara		
2013	School Wars ~Sotsugyou Sensen~	Naezono Oji		
2013	Seishun Hajimemashita	Rikuno Kanade		
2013	Storm Lovers 2	Nanao Shiina		
2013	Toki no Kizuna Hanayui Tsuzuri	Hatsushimo Senkimaru		
2014	Devil Survivor 2 Break Record	Daichi Shijima		
2014	Dynamic Chord	Chiya Suzuno		
2014	Gakuen Heaven 2: Double Scramble	Reon Yagami		
2014	Happy+Sugar=Darlin	Tamaki Satomi		
2014	Heart no Kuni no Alice ~Wonderful Twin World~	Humpty & Dumpty		
2014	Pokemon Omega Ruby and Alpha Sapphire	Yuki (Brendan)		
2014	Re-Vice[D]	Yukine		
2014	Root Rexx	Soma Shiraishi		
2014	Sengoku Basara 4	Shibata Katsuie		
2014	Vinculum Hearts ~Iris Mahou Gakko~	Iris		
2015	Hyakka Yakou	Toki Kage		
2015	Luminous Arc Infinity	Seed		
2015	Touken Ranbu	Hizamaru		
2015	Yume Oukoku to Nemureru 100 nin no Ouji-sama	Lecien		
2015	Granblue Fantasy	Ceylan		
2016	Digimon World: Next Order	Shoma Tsuzuki		
2016	Ikemen Revolution: Alice and Love Magic	Lancelot Kingsley		
2016	Ikemen Royal Palace: Cinderella in Midnight	Rayvis Harnei		
2016	Fate/Grand Order	Assassin of Shinjuku/Yan Qing		
2016	Bungō to Alchemist	Tanizaki Junichirou		
2017	Granblue Fantasy	Gilbert		
2018	My Hero: One's Justice	Katsuki Bakugo		
2018	The Thousand Musketeers	Hokusai		
2018	Dragalia Lost	Orsem		
2018	Shinen Resist	Rosa		
2018	World End Heroes	Rinri Kitamura		
2018	Food Fantasy	Souffle and Tequila		
2018	Piofiore: Fated Memories	Yang		
2018	King's Raid	Neraxis		
2019	Onmyoji	Ootakemaru		
2019	Warriors Orochi 4 Ultimate	Iqbaal Ramadhan		
2019	SD Gundam G Generation Cross Rays	Fon Spaak		
2019	BlackStar - Theatre Starless	Mizuki		
2019	A Certain Magical Index: Imaginary Fest	Accelerator		
2019	Promise of Wizard	Shino		
2020	Yakuza: Like a Dragon	Tianyou Zhao		
2020	Disney: Twisted-Wonderland	Floyd Leech		
2020	Identity V	Naib Subedar, Isaac "Zack" Foster	Angels of Death collab	
2020	#COMPASS	Isaac "Zack" Foster	Angels of Death collab	
2020	Helios Rising Heroes	Gray Reverse		
2021	Cookie Run: Kingdom	Mint Choco Cookie		
2022	JoJo's Bizarre Adventure: All Star Battle R	Ghiaccio		
2022	The Diofield Chronicle	Andrias Rhondarson		
2023	Dragon Quest Monsters: The Dark Prince	Professor Helix Helix		
2023	Fire Emblem Engage	Alcryst		
2023	Da Capo 5	Haruto Mukoujima		
2023	Fate/Samurai Remnant	Chiemon		
2024	Like a Dragon: Infinite Wealth	Tianyou Zhao		
2024	Ride Kamens	Jigen Gamo / Kamen Rider Jigen		
2024	EmberStoria	Aither		
2024	Hatsune Miku: Colorful Stage!	Slade		
2024	Persona 5: The Phantom X	Kira Kitazato / Messa		
2025	The Red Bell's Lament	Asher Thompson		
2026	Final Fantasy Resonance	Rain		
2026	Wolverine	Sunfire / Shiro Yoshida		

=== Dubbing ===
==== Live-action ====
Year	Title	Role	Original actor	Notes	Ref.
2006	Power Rangers Mystic Force	Charlie "Chip" Thorn / Yellow Mystic Ranger	Nic Sampson		
2013–2017	Bates Motel	Norman Bates	Freddie Highmore		
2017–2024	The Good Doctor	Dr. Shaun Murphy	Freddie Highmore		
2021	Leonardo	Stefano Giraldi	Freddie Highmore		
2022	Ms. Marvel	Kareem / Red Dagger	Aramis Knight		

==== Animation ====
Year	Title	Role	Original actor	Notes	Ref.
2018	The Stolen Princess	Lester			
2022	The Last Summoner	Ah Jie			
2023	Wish	Safi	Ramy Youssef		

== Discography ==
=== Mini-albums ===
Year	EP details	Catalog No.	Peak Oricon chart positions	Billboard Japan Top Albums	Nielsen SoundScan	Certifications
2012	Palette: Released: May 23, 2012; Label: Lantis; Format: CD	LACA-35203 (Limited Edition), LACA-15203 (Regular Edition)	daily chart: 6; ( 23 / 5 / 12 ): weekly chart: 9; ( 21 – 27 / 5 / 12 )	8	13	Over 6,000,000 copies sold
2013	Enjoy Full: Released: June 5, 2013; Label: Lantis; Format: CD	LACA-35297 (Limited Edition), LACA-15297 (Regular Edition)	daily chart: 11; ( 5 – 6 / 6 / 13 ): weekly chart: 17; ( 3 – 9 / 6 / 13 )			
2014	Parading: Released: August 13, 2014; Label: Lantis; Format: CD	LACA-35428 (Limited Edition), LACA-15428 (Regular Edition)	7			
2015	Questory: Released: November 25, 2015; Label: Lantis; Format: CD	LACA-35521 (Limited Edition), LACA-15521 (Regular Edition)	15			
2018	Braverthday: Released: October 24, 2018; Label: Lantis; Format: CD	LACA-35745 (Limited Edition), LACA-15745 (Regular Edition)	8			

=== Singles ===
Year	EP details	Catalog No.	Peak Oricon chart positions
2014	"瞬間BEAT": Released: March 19, 2014; Label: Lantis; Format: CD	LACM-34191 (Limited Edition), LACM-14191 (Regular Edition)	16 (weekly chart)
2016	"君の笑顔 僕の笑顔": Released: July 6, 2016; Label: Lantis; Format: CD	LACM-34493 (Limited Edition), LACM-14493 (Regular Edition)	18
2017	"サクラメント": Released: August 9, 2017; Label: Lantis; Format: CD	LACM-14645	20
2017	"Melty Halloween": Released: October 25, 2017; Label: Lantis; Format: CD	LACM-34664 (Limited Edition), LACM-14664 (Regular Edition)	10 (daily chart)
2019	"奇跡の軌跡": Released: July 10, 2019; Label: Lantis; Format: CD	LACM-34878 (Limited Edition), LACM-14878 (Regular Edition)	12

=== Anime songs ===
Year	Title	Album	Character	Manga/game	Notes	Ref.
2009	"愛のツェルニ" ("Ai no Zuellni") feat. Layfon Alseif & Leerin Marfes	Kokaku no Regios Character Songs -The First Session-	Layfon Alseif	Chrome Shelled Regios	With Mikako Takahashi	
2009	"愛のツェルニ ("Ai no Zuellni") Feat. Layfon Alseif	Kokaku no Regios Character Songs -The Second Session-	Layfon Alseif	Chrome Shelled Regios		
2010	"Promise"	Kaichou wa Maid-sama! Character Concept CD4 – Another Side	Takumi Usui	Maid Sama!		
2011	"終わらない夜を" ("Owaranai Yoru o")	Yumekui Merry Character Song – Fujiwara Yumeji	Yumeji Fujiwara	Yumekui Merry		
2011	"何色インユアドリーム" ("Nani iro in Your Dream")	Yumekui Merry Character Song – Fujiwara Yumeji	Yumeji Fujiwara	Yumekui Merry		
2011	"衝動アラーム" ("Shodo Alarm")	Sekai-ichi Hatsukoi Character Song Vol.3 Shoudou Alarm – Shouta Kisa	Kisa Shouta	Sekaiichi Hatsukoi		
2011	"君に出逢えた奇跡 ("Kimi Ni Deaeta Kiseki")	Sekai-ichi Hatsukoi Character Song Vol.3 Shoudou Alarm – Shouta Kisa	Kisa Shouta	Sekaiichi Hatsukoi		
2011	"1/1000永遠の美学" ("1/1000 Eien no Bigaku")	Pretty Rhythm Aurora Dream Livetic Character Song act.4 1/1000 no Bigaku	Wataru	Pretty Rhythm: Aurora Dream	With Takashi Kondō and Kenn	
2011	"1/1000永遠の美学" (instrumental)	Pretty Rhythm Aurora Dream Livetic Character Song act.4 1/1000 no Bigaku	Wataru	Pretty Rhythm: Aurora Dream	With Takashi Kondō and Kenn	
2011	"99.9% Noisy"	To Aru Majutsu no Index II Archives 4	Accelerator	Toaru Majutsu no Index and Toaru Majutsu no Index II		
2011	"Knight of Light"	Sacred Seven Drama Character Album IV Fragment of S7 Kijima Night x Lau Feizooi	Night Terushima	Sacred Seven		
2011	"In My World -青の炎 Edition- With Rin Okumura & Yukio Okumura"	Ao no Exorcist OP2 – In My World	Rin Okumura	Ao no Exorcist	With Rookiez is Punk'd and Jun Fukuyama	
2011	"Wired Life (No Escape Remix) feat. Okumura Rin"	Ao no Exorcist ED2 – Wired Life	Rin Okumura	Ao no Exorcist		
2012	"Trailblazer"	Blue Exorcist Character Song	Rin Okumura	Ao no Exorcist		
2012	"1/1000 永遠の美学" ("1/1000 Eien no Bigaku")	Pretty Rhythm Aurora Dream Prism Music Collection DX	Wataru	Pretty Rhythm: Aurora Dream		
2012	"愛しのティンカーベル ("Itoshi no Tinker Bell")	Pretty Rhythm Aurora Dream Prism Music Collection DX	Wataru	Pretty Rhythm: Aurora Dream		
2012	"あっちでこっちで" ("Atchi de Kotchi de")	Atchi de Kotchi de (あっちでこっちで)	Io Otonashi	Atchi Kotchi	With Rumi Ōkubo, Hitomi Nabatame, Kaori Fukuhara & Shintarō Asanuma	
2012	"あっちこっちまいにち!" ("Atchi Kotchi Mainichi!")	Atchi de Kotchi de (あっちでこっちで)	Io Otonashi	Atchi Kotchi	Duet with Rumi Ōkubo	
2012	"あっちでこっちで" (Instrumental)	Atchi de Kotchi de (あっちでこっちで)	Io Otonashi	Atchi Kotchi		
2012	"あっちこっちまいにち!" (Instrumental)	Atchi de Kotchi de (あっちでこっちで)	Io Otonashi	Atchi Kotchi		
2012	"キラメキサイクル" ("Kirameki cycle")	Atchi Kotchi Character Song Mini-Album	Io Otonashi	Atchi Kotchi		
2012	"Retrospective World"	Retrospective World	Gear	Aoi Sekai no Chūshin de	Duet with Hiro Shimono	
2012	"Retrospective World (Gear solo version)" ("ギア Solo バージョン")	Retrospective World	Gear	Aoi Sekai no Chūshin de		
2012	"Retrospective World (Tezhilov solo version)" ("テジロフ Solo バージョン")	Retrospective World	Gear	Aoi Sekai no Chūshin de		
2012	"Retrospective World (Anime OP version)" ("アニメOP バージョン")	Retrospective World	Gear	Aoi Sekai no Chūshin de		
2012	"Retrospective World (off vocal version)"	Retrospective World	Gear	Aoi Sekai no Chūshin de		
2012	"ヘイボーイ <featuring 岡本信彦 as Seiji Matsuoka sings" ("Hey Boy featuring Nobuhiko Okamoto as Seiji Matsuoka sings")	Kids on the Slope Original Soundtrack Plus more & rare	Seiji Matsuoka	Sakamichi no Apollon		
2012	"バンバンバン <featuring 岡本信彦 as Seiji Matsuoka sings" ("Bang Bang Bang featuring Nobuhiko Okamoto as Seiji Matsuoka sings")	Kids on the Slope Original Soundtrack Plus more & rare	Seiji Matsuoka	Sakamichi no Apollon		
2012	"Restoration to 0"	Code:Breaker Character Song Vol.1	Rei Ōgami	Code:Breaker		
2012		Tiger & Bunny Character Song Album Best of Hero	Ivan Karelin/Origami Cyclone	Tiger & Bunny		
2013	"青春Honesty" ("Seishun Honesty")	Circuit Of Hero Vol.3	Ivan Karelin/Origami Cyclone	Tiger & Bunny	Relay Project; with Go Inoue	
2013	"見切れヒーローイズム" ("Mikire Heroism")	Circuit Of Hero Vol.4	Ivan Karelin/Origami Cyclone	Tiger & Bunny	Single Relay Project	
2013	"チャチャチャdeワッショイ" ("Chachacha de wasshoi")	Circuit Of Hero Vol.4	Ivan Karelin/Origami Cyclone	Tiger & Bunny	Single Relay Project; with Mariya Ise	
2013	"無敵のBuddy" ("Muteki no Buddy")	Hakkenden -Touhou Hakken Ibun- Image Song CD Vol.1	Murasame	Hakkenden: Eight Dogs of the East		
2013	"Hitoshizuku"	Kamisama Hajimemashita Bonus CD Vol. 4	Mizuki	Kamisama Hajimemashita		
2013	"ひとりあやとり" ("Hitori Ayatori")	Kamisama Hajimemashita Bonus CD Vol. 5	Mizuki	Kamisama Hajimemashita		
2013	"Romance"	Bakuman Character Cover Song Collection Album	Niizuma Eiji	Bakuman	Cover of original song by Penicillin	
2013	"Waiwai World"	Bakuman Character Cover Song Collection Album	Niizuma Eiji	Bakuman	Cover of original Dr. Slump – Arale-chan opening theme	
2013	"14 to 1"	14 to 1	Hikaru Asahina	Brothers Conflict	As Asahina Bros.+ Juli with Kenn, Daisuke Namikawa, Hiroshi Kamiya, Junichi Suwabe, Ken Takeuchi, Kazuyuki Okitsu, Tomoaki Maeno, Daisuke Ono, Kenichi Suzumura, Daisuke Hirakawa, Yūki Kaji, Yoshimasa Hosoya	
2013	"Gossip" (duet)	Brothers Conflict Concept Mini-Album – O*TO*NA	Hikaru Asahina	Brothers Conflict	With Daisuke Hirakawa	
2013	"Otona Breakout"	Brothers Conflict Concept Mini-Album – O*TO*NA	Hikaru Asahina	Brothers Conflict	With Kazuyuki Okitsu, Daisuke Hirakawa, Junichi Suwabe, Kenichi Suzumura, Kosuke Toriumi, and Tomoaki Maeno	
2013	"Brand New Venus"	Brothers Conflict Christmas OVA	Hikaru Asahina	Brothers Conflict	With Kazuyuki Okitsu, Junichi Suwabe, Tomoaki Maeno, Yoshimasa Hosoya, and Kenn	
2013	"O*HA*YO"	Brothers Conflict Christmas OVA	Hikaru Asahina	Brothers Conflict	With Kazuyuki Okitsu, Junichi Suwabe, Tomoaki Maeno, Yoshimasa Hosoya, and Kenn	
2013	"2 to 1" (duet)	Brothers Conflict Vol. 3 Extras	Hikaru Asahina	Brothers Conflict	With Daisuke Hirakawa	
2014	"Lunatic Kiss" (single)		Izumi Kyouka	Meiji Tokyo Renka		
2014	"Lunatic Kiss" (duet)		Izumi Kyouka	Meiji Tokyo Renka	Duet with Kenn	
2014	"Nostalgia" (duet)		Izumi Kyouka	Meiji Tokyo Renka	Duet with Kenn	
2014	"Ore no Te de SPARKING!!" ("SPARKING in my hand!!")	Gekkan Shoujo Nozaki-kun Special Character Song CD Vol. 1	Mikoto Mikoshiba	Gekkan Shoujo Nozaki-kun		
2014	"Oikaze ni Tsugu"	Ace of Diamond Character Song Vol. 4	Ryosuke Kominato	Ace of Diamond		
2015	"I Love You ga Kikoenai" (single)		Hikaru Asahina	Brothers Conflict	OVA ending single; as Asahina Bros. + Juli with Kenn, Daisuke Namikawa, Hiroshi Kamiya, Junichi Suwabe, Ken Takeuchi, Kazuyuki Okitsu, Tomoaki Maeno, Daisuke Ono, Kenichi Suzumura, Daisuke Hirakawa, Yūki Kaji, Yoshimasa Hosoya	
2015	"見切れ桜" ("Mikire Zakura")		Hikaru Asahina	Brothers Conflict		
2015	"Opening Theme – The Theory of Savage Youth"	Assassination Classroom: First Season	Akabane Karma	Assassination Classroom	With Mai Fuchigami, Aya Suzaki, Ryota Ohsaka, and Shintaro Asanuma	
2015	"Second Opening Theme – Self-reliance Revolution"	Assassination Classroom: First Season	Akabane Karma	Assassination Classroom	With Mai Fuchigami, Aya Suzaki, Ryota Ohsaka, and Shintaro Asanuma	
2016	"Opening Theme – QUESTION"	Assassination Classroom: Second Season	Akabane Karma	Assassination Classroom	With Mai Fuchigami, Aya Suzaki, Ryota Ohsaka, and Shintaro Asanuma	
2016	"Second Opening Theme – Bye Bye YESTERDAY"	Assassination Classroom: Second Season	Akabane Karma	Assassination Classroom	With Mai Fuchigami, Aya Suzaki, Ryota Ohsaka, and Shintaro Asanuma	
2017	"Ending Theme – Sacrament"		Hiraga Josef Kō	Vatican Miracle Examiner		

=== Game (PSP) songs ===
Year	Title	Album	Character	Manga/game	Notes	Ref.
2010	"promise"	Death Connection Character Song Album	Leonardo	Death Connection		
2012	"「Brand New World」"	『恋は校則に縛られない！』オープニングテーマ「Brand New World」	Satoshi/Kyo	Koi ha Rule ni Shibararenai!	With Yūki Kaji, Terashima Takuma, Miyu Irino, and Kōsuke Toriumi	
2012	"「Brand New World" (Instrumental)	『恋は校則に縛られない！』オープニングテーマ「Brand New World」	Satoshi/Kyo	Koi ha Rule ni Shibararenai!		
2012	"「Brand New World" (Game Size)	『恋は校則に縛られない！』オープニングテーマ「Brand New World」	Satoshi/Kyo	Koi ha Rule ni Shibararenai!		
2012	"「Brand New World" (Instrumental / Game Size)	『恋は校則に縛られない！』オープニングテーマ「Brand New World」	Satoshi/Kyo	Koi ha Rule ni Shibararenai!		
2012	"「Heads or Tails」"	キャラクターソングコレクション Vol.03 羽々崎 暁／キョウ（岡本信彦）	Akatsuki Habazaki/Kyo	Koi ha Rule ni Shibararenai!		
2012	"「Brand New World -Satoshi ver.-」"	キャラクターソングコレクション Vol.03 羽々崎 暁／キョウ（岡本信彦）	Akatsuki Habazaki/Kyo	Koi ha Rule ni Shibararenai!		
2012	"「Heads or Tails -only Satoshi ver.-」"	キャラクターソングコレクション Vol.03 羽々崎 暁／キョウ（岡本信彦）	Akatsuki Habazaki/Kyo	Koi ha Rule ni Shibararenai!		
2012	"「Heads or Tails -only Kyo ver.-」"	キャラクターソングコレクション Vol.03 羽々崎 暁／キョウ（岡本信彦）	Akatsuki Habazaki/Kyo	Koi ha Rule ni Shibararenai!		
2012	"「Heads or Tails – off vocal ver. -」"	キャラクターソングコレクション Vol.03 羽々崎 暁／キョウ（岡本信彦）	Akatsuki Habazaki/Kyo	Koi ha Rule ni Shibararenai!		
2012	"「Brand New World – off vocal / Satoshi ver.-」"	キャラクターソングコレクション Vol.03 羽々崎 暁／キョウ（岡本信彦）	Akatsuki Habazaki/Kyo	Koi ha Rule ni Shibararenai!		
2013	"愛の花束" ("Ai no Hanataba")	Koi Hana Days OP&ED	Tsukasa Ranki	Koi Hana Days		
2013	"朝に夕べに" ("Ashita ni Yuube ni")	Harukanaru Toki no Naka de 5 〜Akatsuki no Koi uta〜 2 Vocal Song CD	Okita Souji	Harukanaru Toki no Naka de 5		
2013	"誠一路" ("Makoto Ichiro")	Harukanaru Toki no Naka de 5 〜Akatsuki no Koi uta〜 2 Vocal Song CD	Okita Souji	Harukanaru Toki no Naka de 5	With Tetsu Inada and Takanori Hoshino	
2014	"Hajimari no Yakusoku"	Vinculum Hearts -Iris Mahou Gakkou- Intro Theme	Iris	Vinculum Hearts ~ Iris Mahou Gakkou ~		

=== Drama CD songs ===
Year	Title	Album	Character	Show	Notes	Ref.
2009	"並べ!元素記号 (勉強科目:化学)" ("Narabe! Ganso Kigou")	Rikei Danshi. Benkyo ni Naru!? Character Song Vol.1 – Hazeru Mizunomoto	Hazeru Mizunomoto	Rikei Danshi. Benkyo ni Naru!?		
2009	"原子分子マイン～ぼくらの理科室～ (『理系男子。』主題歌 【水ノ素 爆】 ソロバージョン)" ("Genshi bunshi Main ~Boku wa no Rika Shitsu~")	Rikei Danshi. Benkyo ni Naru!? Character Song Vol.1 – Hazeru Mizunomoto	Hazeru Mizunomoto	Rikei Danshi. Benkyo ni Naru!?		
2009	"モノローグドラマ 水ノ素 爆 編" ("Monologue Drama Mizu no Moto Bao-Hen")	Rikei Danshi. Benkyo ni Naru!? Character Song Vol.1 – Hazeru Mizunomoto	Hazeru Mizunomoto	Rikei Danshi. Benkyo ni Naru!?		
2010	"結晶バンザイ! (勉強科目: 化学)" ("Kessho banzai! (Benkyou Kamoku: kagaku)")	Rikei Danshi. Benkyo ni Naru!? Character song Second stage Vol. 1 – Hazeru Mizunomoto & Genki Haihara	Hazeru Mizunomoto	Rikei Danshi. Benkyo ni Naru!?		
2010	"情熱ヾ(*・∀・)ノスペクトル (勉強科目: 物理)" ("Jonetsu ( A ) no Spectrum (Benkyou Kamoku – Butsuri)")	Rikei Danshi. Benkyo ni Naru!? Character song Second stage Vol. 1 – Hazeru Mizunomoto & Genki Haihara	Hazeru Mizunomoto	Rikei Danshi. Benkyo ni Naru!?		
2010	"fellowそぞろfollow" ("fellow Sozoro follow")	Rikei Danshi. Benkyo ni Naru!? Character song Second stage Vol. 1 – Hazeru Mizunomoto & Genki Haihara	Hazeru Mizunomoto	Rikei Danshi. Benkyo ni Naru!?	With Daisuke Ono	
2010	"ミニドラマ「ひまわり畑で」" ("Mini Drama 'Himawari Hatake de")	Rikei Danshi. Benkyo ni Naru!? Character song Second stage Vol. 1 – Hazeru Mizunomoto & Genki Haihara	Hazeru Mizunomoto	Rikei Danshi. Benkyo ni Naru!?	With Daisuke Ono	

=== Cover songs ===
Year	Title	Album	Notes	Ref.
2012	"Hakuna Matata"	Disney Koe no Ōji-sama Vol. 2: Dai-ni Shō: Love Stories	Duet with Hiro Shimono	
2012	"Good Company"	Disney Koe no Ōji-sama Vol. 2: Dai-ni Shō: Love Stories		
