= Disney Koe no Ōji-sama =

Disney Koe no Ōji-sama Disney 声の王子様
- Also known as: Disney Koe no Ōji-sama Voice Stars
- Origin: Tokyo, Japan
- Genre: Show tune
- Years active: 2012-present
- Labels: Walt Disney Record; Avex
- Website: avex.jp/Disney-voicestars/

Disney Koe no Ōji-sama (Disney 声の王子様; lit. "Disney Princes of Voice") is a series of Japanese cover albums and concerts produced by Walt Disney Japan. Beginning in 2012, it features Japanese-language versions of Disney songs performed by voice actors of anime series. After a five-year hiatus, the project was later revived as a series of yearly concerts in 2018 under the title Disney Koe no Ōji-sama Voice Stars.

== History ==
=== 2012-2014: Initial music project ===
In January 2012, Walt Disney Japan announced that a cover album titled Disney Date: Koe no Ōji-sama would be released on February 22, 2012, featuring Japanese-language versions of songs from various Disney films. The songs on the album were performed by voice actors Hiroshi Kamiya, Kenichi Suzumura, Jun Fukuyama, Takahiro Sakurai, Tomokazu Sugita, Hikaru Midorikawa, Toshiyuki Morikawa, Tomokazu Seki, Miyu Irino, and Koichi Yamadera. A second cover album titled Disney Koe no Ōji-sama Dai-ni Shō: Love Stories was released on September 19, 2012. Seki, Kamiya, Sakurai, Midorikawa, and Yamadera returned to perform, with new singers including voice actors Akira Ishida, Nobuhiko Okamoto, and Ryōtarō Okiayu. A third cover album, Disney Koe no Ōji-sama: Tokyo Disney Resort 30 Shūnen Kinen Shū was released on March 27, 2013, to celebrate the 30th anniversary of Tokyo Disney Resort. Returning voice actors to the project included Okiayu, Kamiya, Midorikawa, and Yamadera, with new singers including voice actors Daisuke Ono, Yuki Kaji, Junichi Suwabe, Takuma Terashima, and Kohsuke Toriumi. A compilation album titled Disney Koe no Ōji-sama All Stars was released on November 5, 2014.

=== 2018-present: Voice Stars revival ===
In 2018, a new series of cover albums were announced under the umbrella title Disney Koe no Ōji-sama Voice Stars. The first album, Disney Koe no Ōji-sama Voice Stars Dream Selection releasing on September 29, 2018. In addition, a concert titled Koe no Ōji-sama: Disney Voice Stars Dream Live 2019 took place on June 9, 2019, in Chiba. Voice actors participating in the album and the concert included Kaito Ishikawa, Yuto Uemura, Takuya Eguchi, Shunsuke Takeuchi, Kensho Ono, Takuya Satō, Tasuku Hatanaka, Wataru Hatano, Natsuki Hanae, Satoshi Hino, Tomoaki Maeno, and Daiki Yamashita.

On the day of the concert, another installment titled Disney Koe no Ōji-sama Voice Stars Dream Selection II was announced, with the cover album releasing on September 25, 2019. The new cast consisted of voice actors Shintarō Asanuma, Kōhei Amasaki, Subaru Kimura, Shinnosuke Tachibana, Makoto Furukawa, Toshiki Masuda, Taku Yashiro, and Yoshitaka Yamaya, with the addition of 2.5D musical stage actors Yoshihiko Aramaki, Ren Ozawa, Akira Takano, and Shohei Hashimoto. Disney Koe no Ōji-sama Voice Stars Dream Selection II charted at #4 on the Oricon Weekly Albums Ranking on its first week of release. To promote the album, Kimura, Takano, and Aramaki performed on Music Fair on September 27, 2019. The Voice Stars Dream Selection II cast's concert, titled Koe no Ōji-sama: Disney Voice Stars Dream Live 2020, was scheduled to take place on July 12 and August 23, 2020. Amasaki, Aramaki, Ozawa, Kimura, Takano, Hashimoto, and Yamatani also performed as Disney Koe no Ōji-sama Voice Stars at the FNS Music Festival Summer on August 26, 2020.

In December 2020, a third installment was announced, starring Kent Ito, Keisuke Ueda, Wataru Urata, Motohiro Ota, Kurumu Okamiya, Ryohei Kimura, Nobunaga Shimazaki, Hiroki Nakada, Shugo Nakamura, Hiroki Miura, and Showtaro Morikubo. Kazuki Kato and Daisuke Namikawa were also credited as special guests. Their album, Disney Koe no Ōji-sama Voice Stars Dream Selection III, is slated for a release date of February 24, 2021.

== Discography ==
=== Albums ===
List of albums, with selected chart positions, sales figures and certifications
| Title | Year | Details | Peak chart positions | Sales |
| Title | Year | Details | JPN | Sales |
|---|---|---|---|---|
| Disney Date: Koe no Ōji-sama | 2012 | Released: February 22, 2012; Label: Walt Disney Record; Format: CD | 6 | — |
| Disney Koe no Ōji-sama Dai-ni Shō: Love Stories | 2012 | Released: September 19, 2012; Label: Walt Disney Record; Format: CD | 25 | — |
| Disney Koe no Ōji-sama: Tokyo Disney Resort 30 Shūnen Kinen Shū | 2013 | Released: March 27, 2013; Label: Walt Disney Record; Format: CD, digital download | 13 | — |
| Disney Koe no Ōji-sama All Stars | 2014 | Released: November 5, 2014; Label: Walt Disney Record; Format: CD, digital download | 49 | — |
| Disney Koe no Ōji-sama Voice Stars Dream Selection | 2018 | Released: September 19, 2018; Label: Walt Disney Record; Format: CD, digital download | 4 | — |
| Disney Koe no Ōji-sama Voice Stars Dream Selection II | 2019 | Released: September 25, 2019; Label: Avex Pictures; Format: CD, digital download | 4 | — |
| Disney Koe no Ōji-sama Voice Stars Dream Selection III | 2021 | Released: February 24, 2021; Label: Walt Disney Record; Format: CD, digital download | 8 | JPN: 14,259 |
"—" denotes releases that did not chart or were not released in that region.
