= Diploma (Japan) =

Diploma in Japanese has two meanings. They can be translated into "Senmonshi" (Japanese: 専門士), the Japanese original academic degree, and the certificate of graduation.

== Usage ==
=== Japanese original academic degree ===
The first meaning is a Japanese original academic degree given to people who had spent more than 2 years and successfully completed a particular specialized course of study at the vocational school certified by Japanese educational ministry. This academic degree was established in 1994 to improve the graduates' reputation and to promote lifelong learning. This is called Senmonshi (専門士), which means a specialist or an expert in Japanese. Its level is equal to associate or foundation degree given by the junior college. The name of academic degree in English was translated into "technical associate" in the past. The vocational schools in this article mean a Senmon-gakkō (専門学校), which means a professional training college, and a Senshū-gakkō (専修学校), which means a specialized training colleges.

==== Courses ====
- Technology (工業)
- Agriculture (農業)
- Medical Care (医療)
- Personal Care and Nutrition (衛生)
- Education and Welfare (教育・社会福祉)
- Business (商業実務)
- Fashion and Home Economics (服飾・家政)
- Culture and General Education (文化・教養)
- Music (音楽)

==== Requirements ====
- To spend the school-life more than 2 years at the certified vocational schools.
- To spend the more than 1700 lessons (about 1416 hours which are equal to about 63 credits in a university and a junior college) before the graduation.
- To pass the examinations assigned by the certified vocational schools.

=== Certificate of Graduation ===
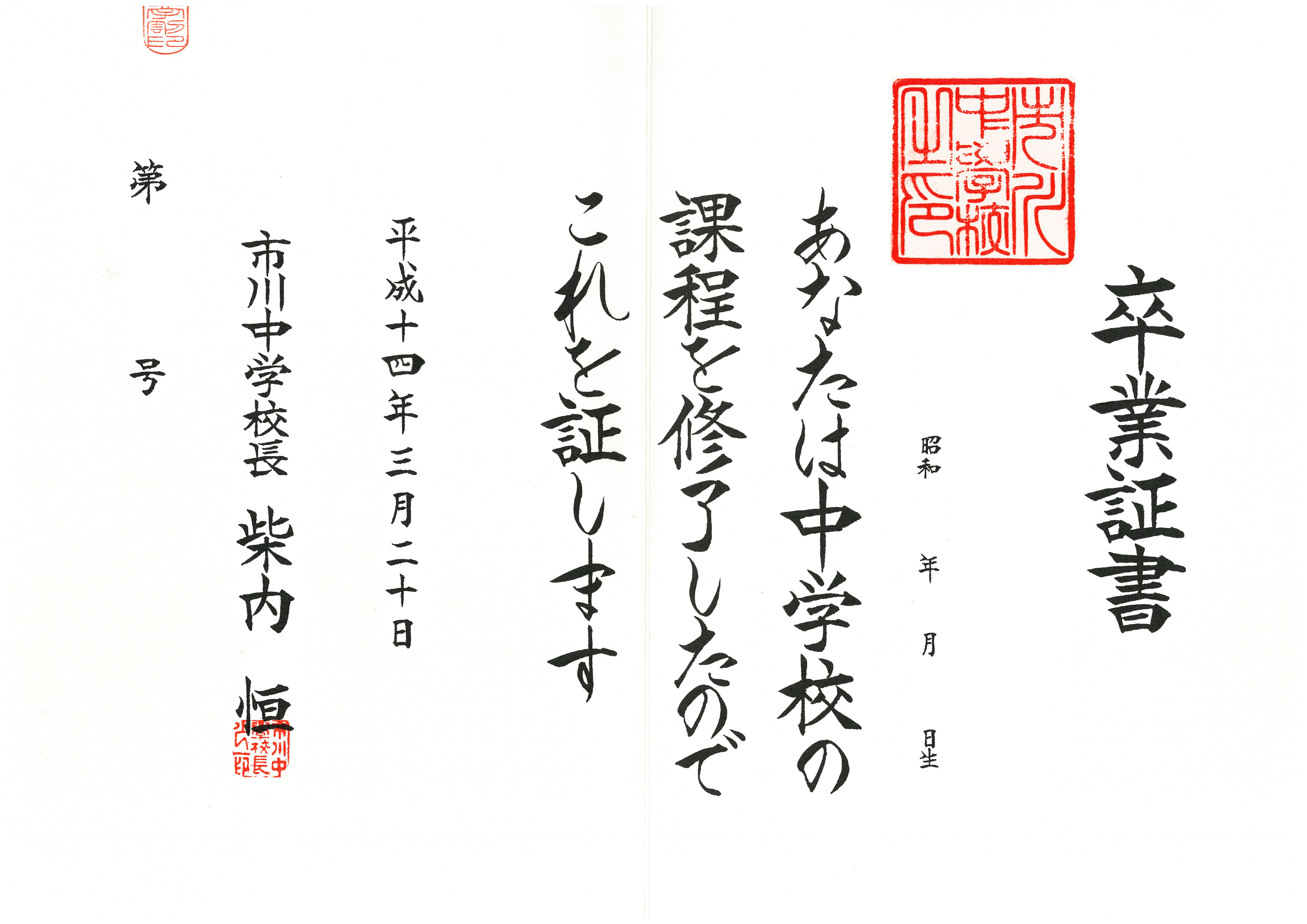
Graduation deed of Japanese junior high school in 2002

The second meaning is documents of certificate of graduation or deed of Graduation issued by the educational institutions, such as an elementary school, a junior high school, a high school, and a university, which testified that the recipient has successfully completed a particular course of study, or confers an academic degree. This is called a "Sotsugyō Shōsho" (Japanese:卒業証書) which literally means the certificate of graduation.

== See also ==
- Advanced Diploma
