= Advanced Diploma (Japan) =

Advanced Diploma (高度専門士, kōdo-senmonshi) is the Japanese original academic degree given to people who had spent more than 4 years and successfully completed a particular specialized course of study at the vocational schools certified by Japanese MEXT (the educational ministry of the Japanese government). The vocational schools in this article mean a senmon-gakkō (専門学校) which means a professional training college and a senshū-gakkō (専修学校) which means a Specialized training college. This academic degree was established in 2005 to improve the graduates' reputation and to promote lifelong learning. Its level is equal to Bachelor given by the university.

== Requirements ==
- To spend more than 4 years.
- To spend more than 3,400 lessons (equal to about 2,834 hours and 126 credits at a university) before graduation.
- There is a proper system of education assigned by certified vocational schools.
- To pass the examinations assigned by certified vocational schools.

== See also ==
- Diploma (Japan)
