= Warabé Aska =

Children's book author and illustrator (born 1944)

- Born: Takeshi Masuda; 3 February 1944 (age 82); Kagawa Prefecture, Japan
- Occupations: Children's book author and illustrator
- Children: 3
- Writing career
- Notable awards: City of Toronto Book Award (1985)

Takeshi Masuda (born 1944), who uses the pen name Warabé Aska, is a children's book author and illustrator.

Masuda was born in Kagawa Prefecture on 3 February 1944. His father died during World War II, before Masuda was born, so Masuda grew up with his mother (a seamstress) and grandmother. While living in Japan, Masuda studied at a polytechnic school. He began using the name Warabé Aska in his early twenties.

He began his career as a commercial artist and graphic designer before becoming a children's book illustrator. His published his first book, Discovering Japan in 80 Days, in 1973. Before immigrating to Canada in 1979, he illustrated a dozen children's books. Following his move, Masuda continued illustrating children's books. His first book published in Canada, Who Goes to the Park, won the 1985 City of Toronto Book Award, becoming the first children's book to receive the honour. Since then, Masuda has written and illustrated children's books, as well as exhibited his artwork in galleries.

As of 2026, Masuda lives in Toronto. He is married and has three children.

== Awards ==
Award's for Aska's work
Year	Work	Award	Result	Ref.
1985	Who Goes to the Park	City of Toronto Book Award	Winner	
1990	Seasons	Governor General's Award for English-language children's illustration	Finalist	
1990	Seasons	Studio Magazine Award	Gold	
1993	Aska's Birds	Tehran International Biennale of Illustration	1st	
1995	Aska's Sea Creatures	Governor General's Award for English-language children's illustration	Finalist	

== Select publications ==
- Aska, Warabé (1984). Who Goes to the Park. Tundra.
- Aska, Warabé (1990). Who Hides in the Park. Tundra.
- Aska, Warabé (1990). Manguel, Alberto (ed.). Seasons. Delacorte.
- Day, David (1991). Aska's Animals. Illustrated by Warabé Aska. Delacorte.
- Day, David (1992). Aska's Birds. Illustrated by Warabé Aska. Delacorte.
- Day, David (1994). Aska's Sea Creatures. Illustrated by Warabé Aska. Delacorte.
- Takamado, Hisako (1998). Lulie the Iceberg. Illustrated by Warabé Aska. Kodansha.
- Aska, Warabé (2006). Tapicero Tap Tap. Tundra.
