= Keisuke Ueda =

Japanese actor (born 1989)

- 植田 圭輔
- Born: September 5, 1989 (age 37); Osaka Prefecture, Japan
- Occupations: Actor; singer; television personality
- Years active: 2006–present
- Agent: Pasture
- Website: keisuke-ueda.jp

Keisuke Ueda (植田 圭輔, Ueda Keisuke; born September 5, 1989) is a Japanese actor and television personality affiliated with Pasture.

Since 2007, Ueda has been involved with 2.5D musicals and other musical theatre productions, most notably as Choromatsu from Osomatsu-san on Stage: Six Men's Show Time, Yukine from the Noragami stage plays, Misaki Yata from the K stage plays, Japan from the Hetalia musicals, Pharos and Ryoji Mochizuki from Persona 3: The Weird Masquerade, Chuya Nakahara from the Bungo Stray Dogs stage plays, and Syo Kurusu from the Uta no Prince-sama: Gekidan Shining musicals. He portrayed Sangaku Manami in both the Yowamushi Pedal stage plays and the live-action drama adaptation. As a voice actor, his leading roles include Heine Wittgenstein from The Royal Tutor and Hiroki from Pet, who he also portrayed in the tie-in stage adaptations.

Apart from his acting career, Ueda debuted as a singer in 2018 with the song "Start Line: Toki no Wadachi", with his first album, Voice of.. released in 2019.

== Career ==
=== Acting career ===
Ueda was a finalist in the 19th Junon Super Boy Contest held in 2006. In 2007, he debuted as an actor in the stage play Osaero. In the same year, he made his leading role debut as Abe no Masahiro in the stage adaptation of Shōnen Onmyōji. Throughout his early theatre career, Ueda worked with the all-male theatre troupe Gekidan Studio Life. Ueda also had guest roles in Unubore Deka and Kamen Rider Wizard on television, but after being cast as Sangaku Manami from the Yowamushi Pedal stage plays, he reprised his role for the live-action drama series in his regular debut role.

In 2013, Ueda made his voice acting debut in Yamishibai: Japanese Ghost Stories. In 2017, he was cast in his first anime leading role as Heine Wittgenstein in The Royal Tutor, who he also portrayed in the musicals.

=== Music career ===
In 2016, Ueda collaborated with the music label Aquamarine for their Otogimmick music project. The Sleeping Beauty-inspired "Nemuri-hime" was released on December 23, 2016, in "Prince" and "Devil" editions. The single charted at #123 on the Oricon Weekly Singles Chart.

On May 30, 2018, Ueda released his debut single, "Start Line (Toki no Wadachi)" as part of the "Bogland Music" project between Yamaha Music Communications and stage actors. The song was featured as the ending theme to the television program +Music and peaked at #25 on the Oricon Weekly Singles Chart.

== Discography ==
=== Albums ===
List of studio albums, with selected chart positions, sales figures and certifications
Title	Year	Album details	Peak chart positions		Sales
Title	Year	Album details	JPN		Sales
Title	Year	Album details	Oricon	Billboard Japan	Sales
Voice of..	2019	Released: May 22, 2019; Label: Yamaha Music Communications; Formats: CD, digital download	25	TBA	JPN: 2,232
"—" denotes releases that did not chart or were not released in that region.

=== Singles ===
==== As lead artist ====
Title	Year	Peak chart positions		Sales	Album
Title	Year	JPN		Sales	Album
Title	Year	Oricon	Hot 100	Sales	Album
"Start Line (Toki no Wadachi)" (START LINE ～時の轍～)	2018	25	—	—	Non-album single
"—" denotes releases that did not chart or were not released in that region.

==== As featured artist ====
Title	Year	Peak chart positions		Sales	Album
Title	Year	JPN		Sales	Album
Title	Year	Oricon	Hot 100	Sales	Album
"Nemuri-hime" (眠り姫) (Otogimmick feat. Keisuke Ueda)	2016	123	—	—	Non-album single
"—" denotes releases that did not chart or were not released in that region.

=== Soundtrack appearances ===
List of soundtrack appearances, with other performing artists, showing year released and album name
Title	Year	Peak chart positions		Sales	Other artist(s)	Album
Title	Year	JPN		Sales	Other artist(s)	Album
Title	Year	Oricon	Hot 100	Sales	Other artist(s)	Album
"Prince Night (Doko ni Ita no sa!? My Princess)" (Prince Night～どこにいたのさ!? MY PRINCESS～)	2017	19	—	—	Yūya Asato, Yūto Adachi, Daisuke Hirose, and Shouta Aoi (as P4 with T)	Non-album single
"Tomodachi Ijō × Teki Miman" (友達 以上×敵 未満)	2019	78	—	—	Yūya Asato, Yūto Adachi, Daisuke Hirose, and Shouta Aoi (as P4 with T)	Non-album single

== Filmography ==
=== Theatre ===
Year	Title	Role	Notes
2007	Shōnen Onmyōji	Abe no Masahiro	—
2008	The Long Kiss Goodnight	Kit	—
2010	Miracle Train: Ōedo-sen e Yōkoso	Shiodome Iku	
2010	The Heart of Thomas	Ante Lower	
2011	Romeo and Juliet	Juliet	—
2013	Yowamushi Pedal	Sangaku Manami	—
2014	Persona 3: The Weird Masquerade: The Blue Awakening	Pharos	
2014	Persona 3: The Weird Masquerade: The Ultramarine Labyrinth	Pharos	
2014	K	Misaki Yata	—
2014	Yowamushi Pedal Hakone Gakuen-hen: Yajū Kakusei	Sangaku Manami	
2015	Yowamushi Pedal: Inter-high-hen: The Winner	Sangaku Manami	
2015	Persona 3: The Weird Masquerade: The Bismuth Crystals	Ryoji Mochizuki	
2015	K: Arousal of King	Misaki Yata	—
2015	Hetalia: Singin' in the World	Japan	
2016	Noragami: Kami to Negai	Yukine	
2016	Samurai Warriors	Ishida Mitsunari	
2016	K: Lost Small World	Misaki Yata	
2016	Osomatsu-san on Stage: Six Men's Show Time	Choromatsu	
2016	Hetalia: The Great World	Japan	
2017	Noragami: Kami to Kizuna	Yukine	
2017	Persona 3: The Weird Masquerade: The Indigo Pledge and Beyond the Blue Sky	Pharos, Ryoji Mochizuki, Nyx	
2017	Uta no Prince-sama: Gekidan Shining: Tenka Muteki no Shinobu Michi	Syonosuke (Syo Kurusu)	
2017	Bungo Stray Dogs	Chūya Nakahara	
2017	Hetalia: In the New World	Japan	
2017	The Royal Tutor	Heine Wittgenstein	
2017	Super Danganronpa 2: Sayonara Zetsubō Gakuen THE STAGE 2017	Fuyuhiko Kuzuryu	
2017	K: Missing Kings	Misaki Yata	
2018	Osomatsu-san on Stage: Six Men's Show Time 2	Choromatsu	
2018	Hetalia Final Live: A World in the Universe	Japan	
2018	Kigeki Osomatsu-san	Choromatsu	
2018	Pet: Kowareta Suiso	Hiroki	
2019	The Royal Tutor: Musical II	Heine Wittgenstein	
2019	Bungo Stray Dogs: Sansha Teiritsu	Chūya Nakahara	
2019	A3! Mankai Stage: Autumn & Winter 2019	Mikage Hisoka	
2019	Re:Volver	Suzuki	
2020
2020	Kimetsu no Yaiba: The Stage	Zenitsu Agatsuma	
2020	Gin-chan ga Iku (銀ちゃんが逝く)	Yasu	
2020	Hōtei no Ōsama (法廷の王様)	Ringo Amemiya	
2020	A3! Mankai Stage: Winter 2020	Mikage Hisoka	
2021	Chocolate Kyoso: A Tale of the Truth (チョコレート戦争～a tale of the truth～)	Minami Kubo	
2021	A3! Mankai Stage: Winter 2021	Mikage Hisoka	
2021	Shiritsu Tantei Hama Mike: Waga Jinsei Saiaku no Toki (私立探偵 濱マイク -我が人生最悪の時-, Shiritsu Tantei Hama Maiku: Waga Jinsei Saiaku no Toki)	Kaihei	
2021	Bungo Stray Dogs: Dead Apple	Chūya Nakahara	
2021	World Trigger the Stage	Yūma Kuga	
2021	Bungo Stray Dogs: Dazai, Chūya, 15 Years Old	Chūya Nakahara	
2021	Hetalia: The World is Wnderful	Japan	
2022	Vanitas no Carte: Stage	Vanitas	
2022	Tokyo Revengers: Bloody Halloween	Chifuyu Matsuno	
2022	Kimetsu no Yaiba: The Mugen Train	Zenitsu Agatsuma	
2023	Vanitas no Carte: Stage (Encore)	Vanitas	
2023	Kimetsu no Yaiba: The Entertainment District	Zenitsu Agatsuma	
2025	Kimetsu no Yaiba: The Swordsmith Village	Zenitsu Agatsuma	

=== Television ===
Year	Title	Role	Network	Notes
2011	Unubore Deka	Host Kazuta	TBS	Episode 2
2012	Kamen Rider Wizard	Satoshi Ishii / Lizardman	TV Asahi	Episodes 14 and 15
2016	Yowamushi Pedal	Sangaku Manami	BS Sky PerfecTV!	
2017	Yowamushi Pedal 2nd Season	Sangaku Manami	BS Sky PerfecTV!	
2019	Real Fake	Yūsuke Ikuta	MBS TV	

=== Film ===
Year	Title	Role	Notes
2019	The Royal Tutor	Heine Wittgenstein	Voice in anime film

=== Anime ===
Year	Title	Role	Notes
2013	Yamishibai: Japanese Ghost Stories	Additional voices	Episode 7, 14
2016	My Hero Academia	Lunch Rush	Supporting role
2017	The Royal Tutor	Heine Wittgenstein	Lead role
2018	My Sweet Tyrant	Masago Matsuo	Supporting role
2020	Pet	Hiroki	Lead role

== Publications ==
=== Photo books ===
Year	Title	Publisher	ISBN
2015	Zenbu, Ore. (全部、俺。)	Shufu to Seikatsu-sha	ISBN 978-4391147636
2019	U and You	Shufu to Seikatsu-sha	ISBN 978-4391153422
