= The Royal Tutor =

Japanese manga and anime series

- Cover of The Royal Tutor volume 1 by Square Enix

王室教師ハイネ (Ōshitsu Kyōshi Haine)
- Genre: Comedy, historical
- Manga
- Written by: Higasa Akai
- Published by: Square Enix
- English publisher: NA: Yen Press
- Magazine: Monthly GFantasy
- Original run: November 18, 2013 – May 18, 2021
- Volumes: 17
- Anime television series
- Directed by: Katsuya Kikuchi
- Produced by: Tomokazu Iizumi; Kiwa Watanabe; Satoshi Umetsu; Mika Shimizu; Tarō Iwahana; Takeshi Nakagawa; Motoo Kawabata; Koutaro Nakayama; Shunsuke Matsumura; Kenichi Morikawa; Satoshi Kubota; Haruka Kakutani
- Written by: Kimiko Ueno
- Music by: Keiji Inai
- Studio: Bridge
- Licensed by: Crunchyroll
- Original network: TV Tokyo, TVO, AT-X, BS Japan
- Original run: April 4, 2017 – June 20, 2017
- Episodes: 12
- Anime film
- Directed by: Katsuya Kikuchi
- Written by: Kimiko Ueno
- Music by: Keiji Inai
- Studio: Tear Studio
- Licensed by: Crunchyroll
- Released: February 16, 2019
- Runtime: 60 minutes

The Royal Tutor (Japanese: 王室教師ハイネ, Hepburn: Ōshitsu Kyōshi Haine) is a Japanese manga series written and illustrated by Higasa Akai. It was serialized in Square Enix's shōnen manga magazine Monthly GFantasy from November 2013 to May 2021. It has been collected in seventeen tankōbon volumes as of August 2021. Yen Press has licensed the manga and distributed monthly chapters digitally. An anime television adaptation by Bridge aired from April 4 to June 20, 2017.

== Plot ==
Heine Wittgenstein, a man often mistaken for a small child, has been summoned to the royal palace of Glanzreich by the king to act as the royal tutor to the four younger princes—Kai, Bruno, Leonhard, and Licht–turning them into capable candidates to the throne. However, he finds his task difficult because of the complicated personalities of his charges, who had managed to cause every tutor to quit.

== Characters ==
=== Main characters ===
Heine Wittgenstein (ハイネ・ヴィトゲンシュタイン, Haine Witogenshutain)
Voiced by: Keisuke Ueda (Japanese); Micah Solusod (English)
The titular royal tutor. Heine is an adult man who is often mistaken for a child due to his short stature. In contrast to his childlike looks, he is a very serious person who does not show much emotion, except when it comes to being mistaken for a child. He has a multitude of talents, and is stern but kind towards his charges. Not much is known about his past, except that he apparently knew the king long before he came to the palace to take up his duties, used to tutor at a church (he still does), and was a violent man in the past. He also was accused of being a criminal in the past, which turned out to be a false accusation.
Kai von Glanzreich (カイ・フォン・グランツライヒ, Kai Fon Gurantsuraihi)
Voiced by: Yūya Asato (Japanese); Daman Mills (English)
The 17-year-old second prince, nicknamed "The Glaring Prince". He has a reputation of being aloof and scary, and it is rumored that he was kicked out of the military academy for getting into brawls. As it turns out, he was suspended because he beat a student who bullied and abused his brother Bruno. He is actually a kindhearted, introverted young man who's bad at social interactions and likes cute and soft things. He likes Heine because he is the first tutor to actually talk to him and because he thinks of him as a cute pet. He is mistaken as scary because he has trouble speaking and often looks as if he is glaring due to his naturally sharp eyes. In the later chapters of the manga, Kai has returned to Military Academy and is currently away on a training trip.
Bruno von Glanzreich (ブルーノ・フォン・グランツライヒ, Burūno Fon Gurantsuraihi)
Voiced by: Yūto Adachi (Japanese); Christopher Wehkamp (English)
The 16-year-old third prince, nicknamed "The Browbeating Brainiac Prince". He is considered to be a child prodigy and a genius. At first, he is dismissive of Heine because he never went to university and assumed that there is nothing that he could teach him, but his attitude changes when Heine beats him soundly in all the challenges he imposes on him, such as chess and mathematics. He starts to idolize him after that and calls him "master", much to Heine's chagrin. In the later chapters of the manga, he has left the palace to travel to his admired professor's country as a consort.
Leonhard von Glanzreich (レオンハルト・フォン・グランツライヒ, Reonharuto Fon Gurantsuraihi)
Voiced by: Daisuke Hirose (Japanese); Alejandro Saab (English)
The 15-year-old fourth prince, nicknamed "The Everest-Pride Prince". He considers himself the most beautiful person on the continent. However, it is quickly revealed that behind his haughty demeanor, he is actually a very childish person prone to sulking and running away from his problems. He is a slow learner and has an intense hatred of teachers because he was abused by them, though this slowly starts to change because of Heine's influence. He looks up to his older brother Bruno. He is extremely athletic and appears to love torte. Although he is not too intelligent, his simplistic way of thinking actually helps in creating solutions to certain problems. He often acts as a tsundere, pretending to be mean but in actuality wanting to be paid attention to and particularly enjoys being praised.
Licht von Glanzreich (リヒト・フォン・グランツライヒ, Rihito Fon Gurantsuraihi)
Voiced by: Shouta Aoi (Japanese); Stephen Sanders (English)
The 14-year-old fifth and youngest prince, nicknamed "The Playboy Prince". He is very cheerful and easy-going and is fond of being surrounded by beautiful women. He has a tendency to sneak out into town, because of his secret job as a waiter at a café. He is surprisingly a perceptive and serious young man despite his flamboyant image. He occasionally clashes with Bruno.

=== Other members of the Glanzreich Family ===
Viktor von Glanzreich (ヴィクトール・フォン・グランツライヒ, Vikutōru Fon Gurantsuraihi)
Voiced by: Toshiyuki Morikawa (Japanese); David Wald (English)
The current King of Glanzreich and the father of the five princes and princess. He ascended to the throne at a young age and is known for his wisdom and for his apparently eternal youth. He gets surprisingly emotional when seeing his children after a long time away or if only a few hours have passed.
Adele von Glanzreich (アデル・フォン・グランツライヒ, Aderu Fon Gurantsuraihi)
Voiced by: Michi Matsui (Japanese); Jad Saxton (English)
The youngest child of the Glanzreich family and the only girl. She is a cheerful, playful three-year-old who enjoys coloring and playing with the royal dog, Shadow. She is already engaged to a foreign prince.
Eins von Glanzreich (アインス・フォン・グランツライヒ, Ainsu Fon Gurantsuraihi)
Voiced by: Daisuke Ono (Japanese); J. Michael Tatum (English)
The eldest prince. He is a genius who is the overwhelming favorite to succeed the throne. However, Viktor considers him to be unfit for the throne due to reasons like he can not speak with women for a long time, caused by a youthful breakup that he had not been able to overcome.
Titania von Glanzreich (マリア・フォン・グランツライヒ, Maria Fon Gurantsuraihi)
Voiced by: Kazuko Sugiyama (Japanese); Linda Leonard (English)
The queen of Glanzreich, wife of Victor and mother of all the royal family. She has a clumsy personality, but she is an intelligent and powerful businesswoman. She loves her sons and daughter, even when she had experienced post-partum depression after their births. In general, she is very similar to Victor, talented but very emotional in her private life.

=== Other characters ===
Maximilian Rosenberg (マクシミリアン, Makushimirion)
Voiced by: Shinnosuke Tachibana (Japanese); Dallas Reid (English)
A palace guard from a well-to-do family. He has a cheerful demeanor. He is known as the greatest fencer among the guards. He's Ernst Rosenberg's cousin.
Ludwig Steiner (ルートヴィヒ, Rūtowiku)
Voiced by: Daisuke Namikawa (Japanese); Jarrod Greene (English)
A palace guard from a commoner family. He has a serious demeanor.
Ernst Rosenberg (エルンスト・フォン・ローゼンベルグ, Erunsuto Fon Rozenberugu)
Voiced by: Takuya Eguchi (Japanese); Joel McDonald (English)
A count who is also the high steward of the eldest prince Eins. He's been behind many of the obstacles that stand between the four princes and their paths to the throne, such as being the one to tell on Licht's secret job as waiter to his father, and introducing Bruno to the professor he admires in hopes that he removes himself from the race to the throne in order to study abroad in the professor's country. He is Maximilian's cousin.
Ralf von Fuchs (ラルフフォンフックス, Rarufu fon Fukkusu)
Voiced by: Keito Okuyama (Japanese); Justin Briner (English)
Ralf is a former student of the military academy that Bruno and Kai formerly attended. Jealous of Bruno's success at the academy, Fuchs wrongfully believed that Bruno's grades were unjustly granted due to his royal lineage. This led him to attack Bruno. Kai, having defended his brother, was suspended from the academy and branded as violent. Despite this, Kai later attempted to apologize. Ralf von Fuchs is currently in prison for abducting and threatening Kai, Heine, and Maximilian.
Ivan Alexandruwitsch Romano (イヴァン・アレクサンドルヴィチ・ロマーノ, Iban Arekusandorubichi Romāno)
Voiced by: Shohei Hashimoto
An original character created for The Royal Tutor: The Movie, Ivan is the first prince of the Romano family who Heine nicknames the "Jack-knife Prince". He is abrasive and quick to dismiss performance arts due to his strict upbringing and pressure brought upon by his father.
Eugene Alexandruwitsch Romano (ユージン・アレクサンドルヴィチ・ロマーノ, Yūjin Arekusandorubichi Romāno)
Voiced by: Shogo Sakamoto
An original character created for The Royal Tutor: The Movie, Eugene is the second prince of the Romano family and Ivan's younger twin brother. Heine nicknames him the "Darkside Prince", and despite Eugene's even temperament, he gives up easily. He is talented at singing, which he keeps hidden from his father.

== Media ==
=== Manga ===
Written and illustrated by Higasa Akai, The Royal Tutor was serialized in Square Enix's shōnen manga magazine Monthly GFantasy from November 18, 2013, to May 18, 2021. Square Enix has published the compiled volumes since June 27, 2014. There are seventeen volumes. Yen Press had announced its license of the series in 2015, and they are currently releasing translated chapters monthly digitally.

==== Volume list ====
No.	Original release date	Original ISBN	English release date	English ISBN
1	June 27, 2014	978-4757543454	August 18, 2015 (ebook); May 23, 2017 (print)	978-0316439794
2	August 27, 2014	978-4757544048	August 18, 2015 (ebook); July 18, 2017 (print)	978-0316562843
3	February 27, 2015	978-4757545755	September 29, 2015 (ebook); September 19, 2017 (print)	978-0316441001
4	July 27, 2015	978-4757547032	October 6, 2015 (ebook); November 14, 2017 (print)	978-0316270502
5	November 21, 2015	978-4757548176	January 30, 2018	978-0316480079
6	April 27, 2016	978-4757549685	April 17, 2018	978-0316446631
7	October 27, 2016	978-4757551428	May 22, 2018	978-0316446648
8	March 27, 2017	978-4757553002	July 24, 2018	978-1975353339
9	July 27, 2017	978-4757554252	September 18, 2018	978-1975354398
10	January 27, 2018	978-4757556089	November 13, 2018	978-1975328153
11	July 27, 2018	978-4757557963	April 30, 2019	978-1975330354
12	January 26, 2019	978-4757559912	August 27, 2019	978-1975385118
13	July 26, 2019	978-4757562189	February 18, 2020	978-1975307899
14	January 27, 2020	978-4757564848	November 3, 2020	978-1975317850
15	July 27, 2020	978-4757567726	June 22, 2021	978-1975324544
16	January 27, 2021	978-4757570542	Apr 26, 2022	978-1975340780
17	August 27, 2021	978-4757574380	Aug 9, 2022 (print)	978-1975347437

=== Anime ===
An anime television series adaptation by Bridge aired from April 4, 2017, to June 20, 2017. The opening theme is "Shoppai Namida" (しょっぱい涙; 'Salty Tears') by Shogo Sakamoto, and the ending theme is "Prince Night (Doko ni Ita no Sa!? My Princess)" (Prince Night〜どこにいたのさ!? MY PRINCESS〜) by cast members Keisuke Ueda, Yūya Asato, Yūto Adachi, Daisuke Hirose, and Shouta Aoi under the name P4 with T. Funimation has licensed the series in North America.

No.	Title (Note: All English titles are taken from Crunchyroll.)	Original air date
1	"The Royal Tutor Arrives" "Ōshitsu Kyōshi, Kuru" (王室教師、来る)	April 4, 2017
In the Kingdom of Glanzreich Heine Wittgenstein is invited by King Viktor to become royal tutor to his four youngest sons to prepare them to rule, should one of them unexpectedly have to replace their oldest brother Einz as heir to the throne. It is well known all previous tutors quit due to the princes difficult personalities. The princes unanimously agree Heine is unneeded and order him to leave, but he refuses, instead forcing them to attend one-on-one meetings to assess their personalities and academic abilities. Fifteen year old Leonhard is by far the most troubling due to his angry childishness, deep mistrust of tutors and habit of running away from anything educational. From stealing Leonhard's diary, Heine learns Leonhard is actually highly emotional, afraid, and full of self-hatred for his lack of confidence and intelligence. Leonhard eventually agrees to take a general knowledge quiz. Heine asks him to attend a mandatory meeting later, and then has Leonhard sent his favorite chocolate cake for finishing the quiz. Leonhard admits despite stealing his diary Heine is not so bad, for a tutor.
2	"The Prince Interviews" "Ōji Mendan" (王子面談)	April 11, 2017
Next is sixteen year old Bruno, an arrogant academic prodigy famous for his expertise in numerous subjects. As Heine has never attended university Bruno is certain there is nothing Heine can teach him. He is therefore astounded when Heine beats him at chess and outperforms him at academics, even on a test Bruno wrote himself. Realizing Heine might be the only tutor smarter than he is Bruno develops a hero worship and starts calling him Master Heine. Next is fourteen year old Licht, an excitable airhead famous for his playboy lifestyle and popularity with women. When he fails to distract Heine with his multiple girlfriends he fills in Heine's test. Heine suspects Licht is smarter than he acts. The last prince is seventeen year old Kai, a quiet, serious boy with a reputation for violence after an incident at military academy. However, after finding him playing with his three year old sister Adele and family dog Shadow Heine realises he is merely socially awkward with naturally glaring eyes and in truth is obsessed with cute things like puppies. Heine decides he failed by relying on gossip about the princes reputations and needs to get to know them better himself.
3	"You Don't Need to Accept Me" "Mitomenakute mo īnode" (認めなくてもいいので)	April 18, 2017
Leonhard refuses to attend the mandatory meeting, certain Heine will eventually quit anyway. Heine learns Bruno's and Licht's personalities frequently clash, forcing Kai to act as peace keeper. Leonhard eventually joins themeeting from guilt and curiosity. Heine shares their tests; Bruno 100/100, Kai 87/100, Licht 60/100 and unfortunately Leonhard 1/100, scoring only a single point for spelling his name correctly. His brothers reassure him he excels at physical skills like sports and hunting, but Leonhard blames Heine and flees on his horse. Heine learns from the others Leonhard was always a slow learner, but their first tutor was an ambitious, abusive man who bullied Leonhard for making him look bad in front of King Viktor, causing Leonhard to despise tutors. Heine rides after Leonhard, his smaller body weight making him the first man ever to catch Leonhard in a race. Heine apologizes for Leonhards past abuse, but promises him he is nothing like that tutor, and if Leonhard lets him, he will help him improve. Leonhard agrees, then realizes their horses have vanished and they are far from home. The royal guard eventually find them and the next morning Leonhard is the first to arrive for their lesson.
4	"The Princes Go To Town" "Ōji, Machi e Iku" (王子、街行く)	April 25, 2017
As understanding the lives of the common man is vital for a king, Heine takes the princes into the city. Leonhard refuses until Heine points out kings are usually beheaded when enough commoners hate them. In the shopping district it is shown Leonhard never learned to count money, but eventually succeeds at buying a hideous doll. Bruno discovers bookstores and tries to buy everything but is forced by his budget to choose only one book. Kai spends all his money on bird-seed to feed pigeons. A thief steals an elderly woman's bag; Leonhard starts to give chase but Kai had caught the thief already. Leonhard feels useless until the woman thanks him for at least trying to help when others would not. Returning home Heine points out the current peaceful way of life was only possible due to Viktor working tirelessly on the citizen's behalf, which future kings should remember and respect. The princes later have a thank you party for Heine with food they cooked themselves and gifts; the doll, the book, a white pigeon, and a masquerade costume. Later, Heine darkly concludes that despite the princes accepting him, he is not the kind of man who belongs in a palace.
5	"Assailed by the Greatest of Trials" "Saidai no Shiren, Shūrai" (最大の試練、襲来)	May 2, 2017
King Viktor returns home, worrying the princes since, despite being a fierce military leader, he is a doting father with frequent outbursts of fatherly affection. Viktor is pleased with their educational progress, except for Leonhard. Despite not wanting to be cruel, Viktor declares unless Leonhard retakes another general knowledge quiz in three days and scores 60/100 he will lose his right to the throne. Heine and the princes help Leonhard study but discover Leonhard can not even calculate 1 + 1 correctly. Heine makes progress on mathematics by suggesting Leonhard visualize slices of chocolate cake for addition, subtraction, division, and times-tables. Leonhard begins averaging 15/100 but runs out of time. Heine tells Leonhard getting a perfect score means nothing, but his attempts to keep improving mean everything. Inspired, Leonhard takes the test but only scores 59/100. Leonhard is devastated, until Viktor points out Heine forgot the one point for spelling his name correctly. Having reached 60/100, Leonhard keeps his right to inherit and Viktor confirms Heine was the right choice for Royal Tutor. Later, meeting privately with Viktor whom Heine has a secret past with; he reminds Viktor of their agreed consequences should Heine's past be revealed.
6	"At Café Mitter Mayer" "Kafe Mittā Maiyā Nite" (カフェ・ミッター・マイヤーにて)	May 9, 2017
Heine discovers Licht has a secret job at a coffee shop, which, despite his airhead persona, he takes very seriously, even using a fake name to avoid discovery. Heine decides to keep his secret since it is so important to Licht, but the mysterious Count Rosenberg tells Viktor everything. Despite Licht's pride in his work Viktor insists he quit over concerns for his safety. Convinced Viktor cares more about the line of royal succession than him, Licht runs away, determined to support himself on just his wages. He is shocked when Viktor visits the café without guards and, posing as a commoner concerned for his son, gets a temporary job as a waiter to understand Licht's feelings, exasperating Heine. Having seen Licht loves his work Viktor decides he can keep working. Realising Viktor has valid concerns for his safety Licht offers to quit. Heine offers a solution; Licht will work once a week and Heine will guard him posing as a customer. Heine wonders what Count Rosenberg is up to. Having failed to disgrace Licht this time Rosenberg moves forward with his plot to see all four princes ruined by scandal and disinherited from ever becoming king.
7	"The Whereabouts of a Dream" "Yume no Arika" (夢の在処)	May 16, 2017
Leonhard makes a suggestion that gives Viktor the idea to establish the first insurance company. This causes Bruno to remember why he started studying: to compete with Eins, who everyone claimed was a natural genius and obvious choice for king. He now worries Leonhard might have some undiscovered genius that would make him the better king. Heine becomes worried when Bruno's latest essay he plans to present at Glanzreich University is unimpressive, even containing spelling mistakes. He gives Bruno two weeks to rewrite it or he will stop tutoring him. Bruno exhausts himself but produces his best work ever. After presenting his improved essay he is praised by his idol, Professor Dimitri, who offers him a chance to study abroad and become a Scholar. Heine encounters Rosenberg, revealed to be Eins' servant, who arranged for Dimitri to meet Bruno to tempt him into becoming a scholar and surrendering his right to inherit the throne. Bruno struggles to decide and is surprised when Heine agrees scholar is a valid alternative if it is what Bruno wants most. Bruno eventually decides not to go as being king was his dream long before he started studying. Rosenberg is unhappy another plan failed and sends his men to investigate the troublemaking Heine.
8	"A Timid Heart" "Okubyōna Kokoro" (臆病な心)	May 23, 2017
Kai asks for help with his social skills. Heine notes Kai talks perfectly with family, but strangers and servants assume from his glaring eyes he is angry and on the verge of violence all the time. Shadow accidentally ruins one of Adele's favorite terrible paintings, so she insists on visiting the zoo to find a new animal friend. Kai and the princes take her so Kai can find someone to talk to, beginning by smiling, though on Kai it looks like a psychotic grin. Adele is bitten by a rabbit and asks to go home before Kai can talk to anyone, where she reunites with Shadow. Kai attempts to compliment the palace staff but due to misunderstandings causes the guards to think the palace is under attack. Sensing Kai is close to giving up Heine advises Kai to limit himself to Hello's and Thank You's and not to let his fear of rejection stop him trying. Kai manages to thank a maid for making his tea and celebrates with his brothers. Heine has Adele's terrible painting repaired, revealing to the amused princes he was the one who painted it and that despite being an expert at everything else he is an atrocious painter.
9	"The Price of the Past" "Kako no Daishō" (過去の代償)	May 30, 2017
A newspaper prints a false story claiming Kai was suspended for attacking an innocent student named Ralf. In fact, Kai had discovered Ralf beating Bruno out of jealousy of his royal position, so he fought Ralf to protect Bruno. Kai was suspended and Ralf was expelled. Despite Kai's innocence, Viktor can not punish the newspaper without being accused of censoring free speech. Kai hopes to convince Ralf to tell the truth. Heine accompanies him with guards Ludwig and Maximilian. Ralf acts apologetic but soon holds them at gunpoint with hired thugs. Ralf had been disinherited following his disgraceful expulsion, so he planted the fake story to lure Kai to him and intends to ransom him for enough gold to flee the kingdom. However, after provoking Ralf into losing his temper, Heine demonstrates remarkable martial ability and strength for his size by escaping, restraining Ralf and defeating the armed thugs bare handed. Kai invites Ralf to become a palace guard when he is released from prison, giving him a chance at redemption. Heine learns that before he was expelled from the academy Ralf was indoctrinated into despising the princes by a friend of his parents. Rosenberg later confronts Heine personally.
10	"The Professor I Don't Know" "Boku no Shira nai Sensei" (僕の知らない先生)	June 6, 2017
Rosenberg reveals Maximilian is his cousin and so is aware of the dramatic changes to the princes since Heine's arrival. Heine confirms Rosenberg is sabotaging the princes to ensure Eins becomes king. Rosenberg reveals he has uncovered Heine's secret past, hinting Heine may have been an enemy of Glanzreich kingdom. Heine visits each prince in turn to check their progress. Leonhard has improved and even occasionally studies by himself. Bruno has begun tutoring students of his own. Kai hopes to convince Viktor to let him return to military academy. Licht has learned from café customers where in the kingdom social inequality still exists and plans to remedy it. Leonhard reveals to the others what he heard Rosenberg say about Heine's past, making them suspicious. Spending time with Heine they discover a box containing letters and keepsakes from his former students, including gifts they bought him. Among his possessions they discover another newspaper article claiming a known criminal recently infiltrated the palace. They dismiss this as lies but Heine asks them as future kings to consider, what they would do if a criminal gained entry in the form of someone they trusted, such as Heine himself.
11	"The Pair's Promise" "Futari no Yakusoku" (二人の約束)	June 13, 2017
Heine challenges them to investigate on their own. First they learn Gregor, the reporter who wrote the article, resigned after receiving a large bribe. Gregor reveals a nobleman paid him to write the article based on a criminal Viktor met before becoming king. Sneaking into the archives the princes discover Heine was once imprisoned for attempting to assassinate Viktor. They attempt to talk to Heine but find him missing. Viktor reveals in his youth he would sneak into the city and one day met Heine, leader of the orphans living in the sewers. Despite their differences they became friends; Heine taught him how to survive on the streets which were far harsher than Viktor could have imagined, inadvertently shaping Viktor into the benevolent king he is today. One day, Viktor's absence was discovered; Heine was mistaken for a kidnapper and Viktor was shot by a palace guard in the confusion. By the time Viktor awoke Heine had been imprisoned but was quickly released. Once Viktor became king he built a church to house the orphans and Heine educated himself into the tutor he is now, eventually becoming the prince's royal tutor. Viktor then reveals that, per Heine's wishes, Heine has resigned as royal tutor.
12	"The Last Lesson" "Saigo no Jugyō" (最後の授業)	June 20, 2017
Heine holds one last lesson with the princes. He explains now his past is revealed he must leave before his presence harms their right to inherit the throne. He praises the progress they have made and is proud that any one of them could become a fine king. He then departs. Rosenberg is thrilled at Heine's absence. Viktor reveals the royal council has already begun looking for a new tutor. Determined to get Heine back, the princes prepare to convince the council Heine is the best for the position of royal tutor. Viktor informs Heine the princes are plotting something. At the meeting the council agrees to hire the tutor nominated by Rosenberg, unaware that tutor is under Rosenberg's explicit instructions to sabotage the princes. The princes crash the meeting to nominate Heine, using lessons he taught them as proof of his suitability. This causes a round of applause, led by prince Eins who had just returned from abroad and is proud his brothers have grown into fine men. Aware of Rosenberg's actions Eins threatens him into leaving his brothers alone to compete with him for the throne as equals. Thanks to their efforts a grateful Heine is reinstated as the royal tutor.

=== Musicals ===
The series has inspired two musicals, with the voice cast of the anime reprising their roles. The first play ran in 2017. The second play ran in April 2019 as a tie-in to the anime film, with Shohei Hashimoto and Shogo Sakamoto reprising their roles.

=== Film ===
The Royal Tutor: The Movie was announced in November 2018 and cast Shohei Hashimoto and Shogo Sakamoto as Ivan and Eugene, two original characters made for the film. It was produced by Tear Studio and released on February 16, 2019. Crunchyroll distributed the film for English release on its release day.
