= Pet (manga) =

Japanese manga series

- First tankōbon volume cover

ペット (Petto)
- Genre: Psychological thriller; Supernatural
- Manga
- Written by: Ranjō Miyake
- Published by: Shogakukan; Enterbrain
- Magazine: Big Comic Spirits
- Original run: July 29, 2002 – October 27, 2003
- Volumes: 5
- Anime television series
- Directed by: Takahiro Omori
- Written by: Sadayuki Murai
- Music by: Hideyuki Shima
- Studio: Geno Studio
- Licensed by: Sentai Filmworks
- Original network: Tokyo MX, BS11, AT-X
- Original run: January 6, 2020 – March 30, 2020
- Episodes: 13
- icon

Pet (Japanese: ペット, Hepburn: Petto) is a Japanese manga series written and illustrated by Ranjō Miyake. It ran in Shogakukan's seinen manga magazine Big Comic Spirits from 2002 to 2003. An anime television series adaptation by Geno Studio was broadcast from January to March 2020. The series was streamed worldwide by Amazon Prime.

== Plot ==
In ancient China, martial artists had developed a psychoactive technique that allows its users to enter the subconsciousness of the human mind by manipulating their enemies' memories via their "Peak", where their most treasured memories are visible and their "Valley", where their most negative memories are suppressed. Later during the 21st century, an organization called "The Company" are tasked with retrieving and securing the descendants of said martial artists by turning them into "Pets", mindless hitmen against various targets who might pose a threat. Tsukasa and Hiroki, a master/pet duo who goes by the name Tsubushiya follows orders from the company as they slowly begin uncovering its secrets as well as a plot involving colleague Satoru and his former foster father, Hayashi.

== Characters ==
Hiroki (ヒロキ, Hiroki)
Voiced by: Keisuke Ueda
Tsukasa (司, Tsukasa)
Voiced by: Kishō Taniyama
Satoru (悟, Satoru)
Voiced by: Yūki Ono
Hayashi (林, Hayashi)
Voiced by: Yasuyuki Kase
Katsuragi (桂木, Katsuragi)
Voiced by: Shunsuke Sakuya
Jin (ジン, Jin)
Voiced by: M.A.O
Ron (ロン, Ron)
Voiced by: Kōji Yusa
Company President (社長, Shachō)
Voiced by: Nobuo Tobita

== Media ==
=== Manga ===
Written and illustrated by Ranjō Miyake, Pet was serialized in Shogakukan's seinen manga magazine Weekly Big Comic Spirits from July 29, 2002, to October 27, 2003. (Note: The series finished in the magazine's 48th issue of 2003 (cover date November 10), released on October 27 of the same year.) Shogakukan collected its chapters into five tankōbon volumes, released from January 30 to December 25, 2003. Enterbrain released a remastered edition in 2009.

==== Volumes ====
No.	Japanese release date	Japanese ISBN
1	January 30, 2003 (Shogakukan); October 26, 2009 (Enterbrain)	978-4-09-186651-6; 978-4-04-726088-7
2	January 30, 2003 (Shogakukan); October 26, 2009 (Enterbrain)	978-4-09-186652-3; 978-4-04-726089-4
3	May 30, 2003 (Shogakukan); November 26, 2009 (Enterbrain)	978-4-09-186653-0; 978-4-04-726126-6
4	September 30, 2003 (Shogakukan); December 25, 2009 (Enterbrain)	978-4-09-186654-7; 978-4-04-726210-2
5	December 25, 2003 (Shogakukan); January 29, 2010 (Enterbrain)	978-4-09-186655-4; 978-4-04-726278-2

=== Anime ===
An anime television series adaptation was announced in March 2018. The series was originally scheduled to premiere in October 2019, but it was delayed to air from January 6 to March 30, 2020, on Tokyo MX, BS11, and AT-X. The series is directed by Takahiro Omori and written by Sadayuki Murai, with animation by Geno Studio. Junichi Hayama is handling the character designs, and Twin Engine is producing the series. It was streamed worldwide by Amazon. TK from Ling Tosite Sigure performed the series' opening theme song "Chō no Tobu Suisō" (蝶の飛ぶ水槽), while Memai Siren performed the series' ending theme song "image _____". The series ran for 13 episodes. In December 2020, Sentai Filmworks announced the acquisition of the series for home video and digital release in North America.

==== Episodes ====
No.	Title	Original release date
1	"The Crushers"; Transliteration: "Tsubushiya" (Japanese: 潰し屋)	January 6, 2020
2	"Views of The Peak"; Transliteration: "'Yama' no Keshiki" (Japanese: 「ヤマ」の景色)	January 13, 2020
3	"Jobs"; Transliteration: "Shigoto" (Japanese: 仕事)	January 20, 2020
4	"A Trap for Hayashi"; Transliteration: "Fukuro no Hayashi" (Japanese: 袋の林)	January 27, 2020
5	"Locks"; Transliteration: "Kagi" (Japanese: 鍵)	February 3, 2020
6	"Back Door"; Transliteration: "Urawaza" (Japanese: 裏技)	February 10, 2020
7	"Revenge"; Transliteration: "Ribenji" (Japanese: リベンジ)	February 17, 2020
8	"Intrigue"; Transliteration: "Sakubō" (Japanese: 策謀)	February 24, 2020
9	"The Way The Wind Blows"; Transliteration: "Kaze no Michi" (Japanese: 風の道)	March 2, 2020
10	"Broken Fish Tanks"; Transliteration: "Kowareta suisō" (Japanese: 壊れた水槽)	March 9, 2020
11	"Reunion"; Transliteration: "Saikai" (Japanese: 再会)	March 16, 2020
12	"Carrier Pigeon"; Transliteration: "Denshobato" (Japanese: 伝書鳩)	March 23, 2020
13	"Rainbow"; Transliteration: "Niji" (Japanese: 虹)	March 30, 2020
