= Hoshin Engi =

Japanese manga series

- First tankōbon volume cover, featuring Taikobo

封神演義 (Hōshin Engi)
- Genre: Adventure; Historical fantasy; Science fantasy
- Manga
- Written by: Ryu Fujisaki
- Published by: Shueisha
- English publisher: NA: Viz Media
- Imprint: Jump Comics
- Magazine: Weekly Shōnen Jump
- Original run: June 24, 1996 – November 6, 2000
- Volumes: 23
- Anime television series

Soul Hunter
- Directed by: Junji Nishimura
- Produced by: Noriko Kobayashi; Masahiro Toyosumi
- Written by: Junji Nishimura
- Music by: Ryo Sakai
- Studio: Studio Deen
- Licensed by: NA: Discotek Media
- Original network: TV Tokyo
- English network: US: International Channel
- Original run: July 3, 1999 – December 25, 1999
- Episodes: 26
- Anime television series

Hakyu Hoshin Engi
- Directed by: Masahiro Aizawa
- Written by: Natsuko Takahashi
- Music by: Maiko Iuchi
- Studio: C-Station
- Licensed by: Crunchyroll
- Original network: Tokyo MX, Sun TV, KBS Kyoto, BS11, AT-X
- Original run: January 12, 2018 – June 29, 2018
- Episodes: 23
- Manga

Hoshin Engi Gaiden: Senkai Dōsho
- Written by: Ryu Fujisaki
- Published by: Shueisha
- Imprint: Young Jump Comics
- Magazine: Weekly Young Jump
- Original run: April 26, 2018 – June 14, 2018
- Volumes: 1
- icon

Hoshin Engi (Japanese: 封神演義, Hepburn: Hōshin Engi; 'Investiture of the Gods') is a Japanese manga series written and illustrated by Ryu Fujisaki, inspired by the Chinese literary classic Investiture of the Gods, a shenmo novel. The manga was serialized in Shueisha's shōnen manga magazine Weekly Shōnen Jump from June 1996 to November 2000, with its chapters collected in 23 tankōbon volumes. The story involves Chinese mythology and history of China, in particular the last members of the Yin dynasty, and the plot to overthrow them. In North America, the manga was licensed for English release by Viz Media. Fujisaki also wrote a short gaiden manga, titled Hoshin Engi Gaiden: Senkai Dōsho, serialized in Weekly Young Jump from April to June 2018.

A 26-episode anime television series, released in English under the title Soul Hunter, was broadcast on TV Tokyo from July to December 1999. A second 23-episode anime television series adaptation, titled Hakyu Hoshin Engi, was broadcast from January to June 2018. The first anime series was first licensed in North America by ADV Films in 2001; it was later acquired by Discotek Media in 2016.

The Hoshin Engi manga has had over 22 million copies in circulation.

== Synopsis ==
=== Setting ===
Set in a fictional ancient China, during the Yin dynasty, the fantastic world of Hoshin Engi encompass both the pre-historical world—in which primitive human society coexist with the revered divine gods and goddesses—and the futuristic world—in which highly technological weaponry, combat strategy, as well as futuristic visions, are employed. The Sennin (仙人, Sen'nin) (Note: Feminine form: Sennyo (仙女, Sen'nyo)) are a group of powerful immortals or hermits with extraordinary abilities and knowledge, who have gained immortality through various means. They possess great wisdom, longevity, and often exhibit exceptional magical or supernatural powers. Each Sennin has their unique skills and abilities, which they use to navigate the world and influence events. The humans who undergo training to become Sennin are known as Doshi (道士, Dōshi). Both Sennin and Doshi use the sacred weapons paope (宝貝, Paopee), versatile instruments that absorb the spiritual energy of their beholders and from their surroundings to amplify their power.

=== Plot ===
A female fox spirit named Dakki exerts control over King Chu and the Yin dynasty, manipulating him to spread corruption and suffering throughout the land. A Doshi named Taikobo is tasked by his mentor, Genshi Tenson, leader of the Sennin World (仙人界, Sennin Kai), with executing the Hoshin Project (封神計画, Hōshin Keikaku). This mission involves sealing Dakki and her followers in the Shinkai (神界; 'Realm of the Gods'), a liminal space between the Sennin World and the Human World. To achieve this, Taikobo must locate and defeat 365 individuals whose names appear on the Hoshin List, with their souls subsequently imprisoned on the Hoshindai (封神台, Hōshindai), a floating island designed to contain them until the ritual is complete. Accompanied by his loyal reiju (霊獣, reijū; 'Spirit Beast' or 'Sacred Beast'), Supushan, Taikobo navigates a world of shifting alliances and conflicts among immortals, uncovering the extent of Dakki's influence over both King Chu and the Human World.

As Taikobo delves deeper into his mission, he uncovers the celestial struggle between gods and immortals, realizing its profound impact on mortal affairs. Caught between his duty as an immortal and his empathy for humanity, he becomes entangled in the conflict. The war culminates in the devastation of both the Sennin and Human Worlds, with countless souls confined to the Hoshindai. Following King Chu's defeat and the fall of the Yin dynasty, Taikobo prepares to return to the remnants of the Sennin World, only to discover the existence of a third realm—Dakki's hidden domain, where she and her remaining followers have retreated.

The true purpose of the Hoshin Project is ultimately revealed to extend beyond Dakki, targeting the primordial entity Joka, one of the First Persons (最初の人, Saisho no Hito)—ancient extraterrestrial beings who arrived on Earth eons ago. Joka, seeking to reshape the world in the image of her lost home, repeatedly annihilates civilizations that deviate from her vision. After forming an alliance with Dakki, she orchestrates history's course until the Sennin intervene. When thwarted, Joka resolves to destroy Earth entirely. In the ensuing battle, Taikobo, recently deceased, reappears, disclosed as one of the First Persons. Drawing upon the energies of his allies and the souls within the Hoshindai, he reawakens as Fukki and defeats Joka, ending her tyranny.

Prior to this, Dakki briefly usurps Joka's form, merging with Earth's life force to become a primordial mother figure. In Joka's final moments, she implores Taikobo to accompany her into oblivion, fearing solitude. Though he initially consents, Dakki intervenes to preserve his existence. In the aftermath, Supushan ventures into the Human World to recount these events, only to find Taikobo alive yet elusive, deliberately avoiding contact while discreetly observing his companions. After a period of wandering, Taikobo embarks on a new journey, his destination unknown.

== Media ==
=== Manga ===
Written and illustrated by Ryu Fujisaki, Hoshin Engi is inspired by the novel of the same title by Tsutomu Ano, which is a Japanese translation of the Chinese literary classic Investiture of the Gods, published by Kodansha between 1988 and 1989. The manga was serialized in Shueisha's shōnen manga magazine Weekly Shōnen Jump from June 24, 1996, to November 6, 2000. Shueisha collected its 204 individual chapters in 23 tankōbon volumes, released from November 1, 1996, to December 22, 2000. The manga was re-released in a 18-volume kanzenban edition from July 4, 2005, to April 4, 2006.

In North America, Viz Media announced at the New York Comic Con 2007 that they had licensed the manga. The 23 volumes were published from June 5, 2007, to June 7, 2011.

Fujisaki wrote a short gaiden manga, titled Hoshin Engi Gaiden: Senkai Dōsho (封神演義外伝～仙界導書～), serialized Shueisha seinen manga magazine Weekly Young Jump from April 26 to June 14, 2018. A tankōbon volume was released on July 19, 2018.

=== Anime ===
==== Soul Hunter ====
Hoshin Engi was adapted into an anime television series, titled Senkaiden Hōshin Engi (仙界伝 封神演義; 'The Immortal World Chronicles: Investiture of the Gods'), produced by Studio Deen and directed by Junji Nishimura. The 26-episodes series was broadcast on TV Tokyo between July 3 and December 25, 1999.

In North America, the series was first licensed by ADV Films in 2001 under the name Soul Hunter. In the United States, the series was broadcast on International Channel. In 2016, Discotek Media re-licensed the series for a single DVD collection release on June 28.

==== Hakyu Hoshin Engi ====
A 23-episode anime television series adaptation titled Hakyu Hoshin Engi (覇穹 封神演義; 'The Sovereign Sky: Investiture of the Gods'), produced by C-Station and featuring a new cast aired from January 12 to June 29, 2018. The series was directed by Masahiro Aizawa, with Natsuko Takahashi in charge of the series scripts, characters design by Yoshimitsu Yamashita and music composed by Maiko Iuchi. Crunchyroll streamed the series, while Funimation produced a simuldub.

=== Video games ===
Four video games published by Bandai have been released: two for the WonderSwan on February 24 and December 21, 2000, respectively; and two for the PlayStation on June 29, 2000, and March 29, 2001. respectively. A video game published by Banpresto was released for the Game Boy Color on November 24, 2000. Characters from the series were also featured in the Weekly Shōnen Jump crossover game Jump Ultimate Stars, released for the Nintendo DS on November 23, 2006.

=== Stage play ===
A stage play musical adaptation titled Musical Hoshin Engi: Mezame no Toki (ミュージカル 封神演義-目覚めの刻-; lit. "Musical Hoshin Engi: Time of Awakening") was performed in EX Theater Roppongi in Tokyo and ran from January 13–20, 2019. The play, directed by Kōtarō Yoshitani, included casts such as Shōhei Hashimoto playing as Taikobo, Yuya Asato as Yozen, and Ryū Kiyama as Nataku.

== Reception ==
By May 2018, the manga had over 22 million copies in circulation. On TV Asahi's Manga Sōsenkyo 2021 poll, in which 150.000 people voted for their top 100 manga series, Hoshin Engi ranked 68th.
