= Shogo Sakamoto =

Japanese actor (born 1993)

Shōgo Sakamoto
- 阪本 奨悟
- Born: June 13, 1993 (age 33); Hyogo Prefecture, Japan
- Occupations: Actor; voice actor; singer
- Years active: 2006–2011, 2012–present
- Agent: Don-crew
- Musical career
- Genres: J-pop
- Instrument: Vocals
- Label: A-Sketch
- Website: www.sakamotoshogo.com

Shōgo Sakamoto (阪本 奨悟, Sakamoto Shōgo; born June 13, 1993 in Hyogo Prefecture) is a Japanese actor and singer affiliated with Don-crew.

== Career ==
Early in his career, Sakamoto played Ryoma Echizen in the fourth generation Seigaku cast in Tenimyu, The Prince of Tennis musical series. In 2009, he originated the role of Ciel Phantomhive in the Black Butler musicals.

He returned to the stage play world in 2018 with the role of Horikawa Kunihiro in the Musical Touken Ranbu franchise.

== Discography ==
=== Albums ===
List of studio albums, with selected chart positions, sales figures and certifications
Title	Year	Album details	Peak chart positions		Sales
Title	Year	Album details	JPN		Sales
Title	Year	Album details	Oricon	Billboard Japan	Sales
Fly	2016	Released: June 29, 2016; Label: Amuse; Formats: CD, digital download	99	TBA	—
Fluffy Hope	2018	Released: July 25, 2018; Label: A-Sketch; Formats: CD, digital download	38	TBA	—
"—" denotes releases that did not chart or were not released in that region.

=== Singles ===
Title	Year	Peak chart positions		Sales	Album
Title	Year	JPN		Sales	Album
Title	Year	Oricon	Hot 100	Sales	Album
"Hanagoe / Shoppai Namida" (鼻声/しょっぱい涙)	2017	31	—	—	Fluffy Hope
"Koi to Uso (Gyutto Kimi no Te o) / Hello" (恋と嘘～ぎゅっと君の手を～/HELLO)	2017	32	—	—	Fluffy Hope
"Mugen no Try" (無限のトライ)	2019	20	—	—	non-album single
"—" denotes releases that did not chart or were not released in that region.

== Filmography ==
=== Television ===
Year	Title	Role	Network	Notes	Ref.
2007	Koisuru Nichiyōbi: Sotsugyō - Haru no Uso	Yuki Tatsuki	BS-i	Segment in Koisuru Nichiyōbi	
2007	Obanzai!	Momotarō Hanazono	TBS		
2009	AIBOU: Tokyo Detective Duo	Murakoshi	TV Asahi	Episode 6, season 8	
2010	Sunao ni Narenakute	Kenta Matsushima	Fuji TV		
2010	Hammer Session!	Kenta Nojima	TBS		
2011	Gō	Mori Rikimaru	NHK	Taiga drama	
2019	Try Knights	Riku Haruma	NTV	Lead role; voice in anime	
2023	Don't Stop My Beautification	Kokono	Paravi		
2024	Shinsengumi: With You I Bloom	Hijikata Toshizō	TV Asahi		

=== Theatre ===
- The Prince of Tennis Musical: The Progressive Match Higa Chuu feat. Rikkai (in winter of 2007-2008)
- The Prince of Tennis Musical: Dream Live 5th (2008)
- The Prince of Tennis Musical: The Imperial Presence Hyotei Gakuen feat. Higa Chuu (2008)
- The Prince of Tennis Musical: The Treasure Match Shitenhōji feat. Hyotei Gakuen (2008–2009)
- The Prince of Tennis Musical: Dream Live 6th (2009)
- Kuroshitsuji The Musical as Ciel Phantomhive (2009)
- Musical: Touken Ranbu as Horikawa Kunihiro (2018)
- The Royal Tutor: Musical II as Eugene Alexandruwitsch Romano (2019)
- xxxHolic as Kimihiro Watanuki (2021)

=== Films ===
Year	Title	Role	Notes
2019	The Royal Tutor: The Movie	Eugene Alexandruwitsch Romano	Voice in anime film

=== Commercials ===
- Honda Informercial (2006)
- PlayStation 3 (2007)
- KDDI Company (2007)
