= Wāqwāq (manga) =

Japanese manga series

- First volume cover
- Genre: Adventure; Post-apocalyptic; Science fiction
- Manga
- Written by: Ryu Fujisaki
- Published by: Shueisha
- English publisher: NA: Viz Media
- Imprint: Jump Comics
- Magazine: Weekly Shōnen Jump
- Original run: August 30, 2004 – May 9, 2005
- Volumes: 4
- icon

Wāqwāq (Japanese: ワークワーク, Hepburn: Wākuwāku) is a Japanese manga series written and illustrated by Ryu Fujisaki. It was serialized in Shueisha's shōnen manga magazine Weekly Shōnen Jump from August 2004 to May 2005. The series individual chapters were collected into four tankōbon (collected volumes) and published from January to July 2005 by Shueisha. It was later licensed in Northern America by Viz Media for an English-language publication, which was released from August 2009 to May 2010. It has been republished by Shueisha, distributed as digital media by Viz Media, and localized in other countries.

Wāqwāq is set in a world where humans have black blood and fear belligerent creatures known as "machines", entrusting their salvation on the Guardians, humans who possess weapons that give them supernatural powers, and on the red-blooded Kami. The series focuses on Shio, a Guardian who meets Matsuda, who is believed to be a Kami, and starts a journey in which he faces other adversaries who want Kami power. Its art and story were initially said to be confusing by some critics, but others stated that these aspects get better as the manga progresses. It was described as a typical shōnen, but its characters and action have received mostly praise.

== Plot ==
Two millennia before the series' events, humans created black-blooded androids to accomplish tasks to facilitate their lives. However, these androids rebel against humanity; to destroy the black-bloodeds, humans created the machines (機械, Kikai). In the aftermath, the red-bloodeds are almost extinct, and the black-bloodeds hide themselves from the machines. Koto (コト), a red-blooded, Yoki (ヨキ), a black-blooded, and Kiku (キク), a machine, collectively known as "The Three Magi" (参賢者, San Kenja), create the Guardian Statue (護神像, Gojinzō) to gather the wishes of its wielders, the seven Guardians (防人, Sakimori), who by fusing with the Gojin-zou gain supernatural powers to fight against the machines, whose wishes are also stored into the Gojin-zou, when they are destroyed. By combining these wishes with the kami's red blood, a machine known as "Spider's Thread" will guarantee any wish; the magi hope the wish that will be fulfilled is to return the world to how it was before the war.

The series focuses on Shio (シオ), a 12-year-old boy, who becomes a Guardian after his village is attacked by machines that kill his father, Al (アル, Aru)—the former wielder of Armaiti (アールマティ, Ārumati), a Gojin-zou that chooses Shio to be its next user. Shio meets Matsuda (松田), a red-blooded girl brought from the past by the magi who is believed to be a kami. Shio and Matsuda, misled by Yoki, travel towards the Spider's Thread. On their way, Shio defeats several Guardians; the magi diffuse the ability the kami's blood has to make the Guardians fight each other, aiming to fulfill the wish of the Guardians, who overcome the others. Along the way, Shio befriends the robot Plasty (プラ, Pura), the Guardian Leonard Hediard (レオナルド・エディアール, Reonarudo Ediāru), and the wannabe ninja Fran (フラン, Furan). When they arrive at Spider's Thread, Shio is killed by Yoki and Koto reveals his real intention is to kill all black-bloodeds. Resurrected by Matsuda's blood, Shio defeats Koto and wishes the red-bloodeds no longer exist. Kiku tells the machines not to attack the humans, Wāqwāq becomes a peaceful place, and Matsuda returns to her world.

== Release ==
Wāqwāq, written and illustrated by Ryu Fujisaki, was originally serialized in the magazine Weekly Shōnen Jump from August 30, 2004, to May 9, 2005. Shueisha compiled its 34 chapters into four tankōbon (collected volumes) and released them from January 5, 2005, to July 4, 2005. Later, on November 18, 2008, Shueisha started to rerelease the series in a bunkoban edition, which spawned three volumes, with the last one being published on January 16, 2009.

At the 2008 Comic-Con, Viz Media announced that it had licensed Wāqwāq for an English-language translation in Northern America. Viz Media published a preview of the first chapter on the August 2009 issue of its magazine Shonen Jump, and the volumes from August 4, 2009, to May 4, 2010. The series was also localized in Hong Kong by Culturecom, in Italy by Star Comics, and in Singapore by Chuang Yi. A digital version of the volumes were also available by Viz Media which released them from June 25, 2013, to August 13, 2013.

=== Volumes ===
No.	Title	Original release date	English release date
1	Proof of the Gods; Tengoku to ha Kamisama no Owasu Koto Nari (天国とは神様のおわすことなり)	January 5, 2005; 978-4-08-873766-9	August 4, 2009; 978-1-4215-2738-3
1. "Proof of the Gods" (天国とは神様のおわすことなり, "Tengoku to ha Kamisama no Owasu Koto Nari"); 2. "Hatred" (憎悪, "Zōo"); 3. "Guardian Qaf and Gojin-zou Khshathra" (防人カーフと護神像クシャスラ, "Sakimori Kāfu to Gojinzō Kushasura"); 4. "Migraine" (偏頭痛, "Henzutsū"); 5. "Kami's Reality and Shio's Faith" (神の現実と塩の信仰, "Kami no Utsutsu to Shio no Shinkō"); 6. "The Battle over Wishes" (願いをめぐる戦い, "Negai o Meguru Tatakai"); 7. "Food" (食, "Shoku")
Shio becomes a Guardian after the death of his father, Al, who dies protecting a girl and a village from the machines. Shio believes Matsuda—the aforementioned girl—is the red-blooded Kami who can save the humankid. A Guardian called Qaf tries to capture her; Qaf is prevented to do it by Yoki, a village's doctor. Shio and Matsuda leave the village and start to head to a village where is located the "Spider's Thread". On their way, they find a robot, which Matsuda names Plasty, and Shio engages in battle another Guardian, Leo. Both Guardians attack Matsuda because they are told by a man in shadow she is the Kami who can fulfill any wish through her blood.
2	The Three Magi; San Kenja (参賢者)	March 4, 2005; 978-4-08-873785-0	November 3, 2009; 978-1-4215-2739-0
8. "The Three Magi" (参賢者, "San Kenja"); 9. "Spirited Away" (神かくし, "Kami Kakushi"); 10. "Guardian Drexel and Gojin-zou Ameretat I" (防人ドレクセルと護神像アムルタ－ト, "Sakimori Dorekuseru to Gojinzō Amurutato"); 11. "Guardian Drexel and Gojin-zou Ameretat II" (防人ドレクセルと護神像アムルタ－トII, "Sakimori Dorekuseru to Gojinzō Amurutato II"); 12. "Fury" (獅子奮迅, "Shishifunjin"); 13. "Flame" (ほのお, "Honō"); 14. "Kami on an I.V." (点滴をする神, "Tenteki o Suru Kami"); 15. "Qaf Makes His Move" (カーフ始動, "Kāfu Shidō"); 16. "Hilarious Ninja Legend Zuranpo" (爆笑忍者伝説ズランポ, "Bakushō Ninja Densetsu Zuranpo")
Shio defeats Leo, and Armaiti eats Leo's Gojin-zou, then he joins Shio and Matsuda, who heals Leo with her blood. Meanwhile, Yoki is revealed to be a magus, and the creator of Gojin-zou along with two other magi, Kiku and the man in shadow—Koto, the last red-blooded. They create the Gojin-zou to store the wishes of the Guardians and the machines. These wishes combined with the Kami's red blood will guarantee any wish—they intend to grant it to the survival Guardian. Matsuda is kidnapped by the magi. On her chase, Shio devours the Gojin-zou of Guardian Drexel, meets Fran, a wannabe ninja, and is engaged in battle by Guardian Nohl. Elsewhere, Qaf devours the Gojin-zou of Guardian Allan.
3	Vow of the Rose; Amusha Spunta-tachi (不滅なる利益者達)	May 2, 2005; 978-4-08-873811-6	February 2, 2010; 978-1-4215-2740-6
17. "Vow of the Rose" (薔薇の誓い, "Bara no Chikai"); 18. "Drifting Petals" (華の散るらむ, "Hana no Chiruramu"); 19. "Al Idrisi's Shadow" (アル・イドリーシの影, "Aru Idorīshi no Kage"); 20. "The Last Guardians—Shio and Leo" (塩と獅子～最後の防人, "Shio to Reo Saigo no Sakimori"); 21. "Guardian Yoki and Spenta Manyu" (防人ヨキとスプンタ・マンユ, "Sakimori Yoki to Supunta Man'yu"); 22. "Raid the Spider's Thread" (突入!蜘蛛の糸, "Totsunyū! Kumo no Ito"); 23. "Shio vs. Yoki" (激突!!シオ対ヨキ!!!, "Gekitotsu! Shio tai Yoki!!!"); 24. "Immortal Amesha Spenta" (不滅なる利益者達, "Amusha Spunta-tachi"); 25. "The Destruction of the Gods and the Birth of Man" (神々の滅亡と人の誕生, Kamigami no Metsubō to Hito no Tanjō")
After defeat Nohl, Shio and Leo have a brief combat in which Shio wins. Elsewhere, Yoki reveals himself as the remaining Guardian and absorbs Qaf's Gojin-zou. Meanwhile, Matsuda is trying to escape from the Spider's Thread. When Shio, Leo, and Fran arrives the Spider's Thread, Koto holds an unconscious Matsuda. Shio and Yoki fight while Yoki and Koto tell how the red-bloodeds create the black-bloodeds who rebel against them—the red-bloodeds then create the machines to fight against the black-bloodeds. Regretful, the three magi create the Gojin-zou and bring back a red-blooded human, Matsuda, hoping the wish that will be fulfilled is to return the world to how it was before the war.
4	Wishes Granted; Negai Kanaishi (願い叶いし)	July 4, 2005; 978-4-08-873846-8	May 4, 2010; 978-1-4215-2741-3
26. "Absolute Fusion" (完全融合, "Kanzen Yūgō"); 27. "Shadow" (影, "Shadō); 28. "Chaos Without Kami I" (地獄とは神の在らざることなり①, "Jigoku to wa Kami no Arazaru Kotonari Ichi"); 29. "Chaos Without Kami II" (地獄とは神の在らざることなり②, "Jigoku to wa Kami no Arazaru Kotonari Ni"); 30. "Chaos Without Kami III" (地獄とは神の在らざることなり③, "Jigoku to wa Kami no Arazaru Kotonari San"); 31. "Sacred Kami's Blood I" (神の血のかくも尊きこと①, "Kami no Chi no Kaku mo Tōtoki Koto Ichi"); 32. "Sacred Kami's Blood II" (神の血のかくも尊きこと②, "Kami no Chi no Kaku mo Tōtoki Koto Ni"); 33. "Sacred Kami's Blood III" (神の血のかくも尊きこと③, "Kami no Chi no Kaku mo Tōtoki Koto San"); 34. "Wishes Granted" (願い叶いし, "Negai Kanaishi")
After Yoki fatally injure Shio, Koto reveals he has been using Yoki to gain the power of all Gojin-zou filled with of wishes. Koto combines all Gojin-zou and go to the villages to kill the black-bloodeds. Meanwhile, Shio is resurrected by Matsuda's blood and becomes stronger than he normally is. Shio engages Koto in battle; using the machine as a distraction, Koto returns to the Spider's Thread, planning have his wish fulfilled. He cut Matsuda, spreading her blood; however before he can wish something, Shio defeats him and wishes the red-bloodeds to disappear. Now, Matsuda returns to her normal life, and the machines and black-bloodes coexist peacefully in Wāqwāq; Kiku says to the machines to do not attack humans anymore.

== Reception ==
Two volumes appeared on the list of the Diamond Comic Distributors's 300 best-selling graphic novels. The first volume sold an estimated 555 copies and appeared at the 205th spot for August 2009. The third volume sold about 290 copies and appeared at the 299th spot in February 2010.

Karen Maeda and Amanda Tarbet of Sequential Tart, Comic Book Bin's Leroy Douresseaux, Mania's Patricia Beard, Comic Book Resources's Michelle Smith, and Pop Culture Shock's Sam Kusek said its art to be confusing. On the contrary, Active Anime's Holly Ellingwood, ICv2's Steve Bennett, Anime News Network's Carlo Santos, and a Publishers Weekly's reviewer praised its art; it was said to be imaginative, and its character designs "full of unorthodox curves and lines ... look unlike anything else in the genre", according to Santos. Beard, Kusek and Tarbet criticized the story; the former qualified it as "poorly elaborated", and the latter two found the story lacked explanations about the plot. On the other hand, Ellingwood stated it is "an enthralling story" because there are mysteries to be discovered. Smith praised how the plot was elucidated a bit in the second volume, but still thought it was "convoluted" as in the first one. Douresseaux described that in the second volume "the narrative runs a lot smoother, unencumbered" and Fujisaki's art was "a lot of clearer". Douresseaux, Beard, Bennett, Santos and Kusek described it as having elements from a typical shōnen series. Conversely, Douresseaux stated "The eccentric narrative and the eclectic art makes the four-volume Wāqwāq unique graphical storytelling", while Ellingwood declared "The originality and creativity in the story and the art work make it a stand out from the norm in manga."

Regarding its characters, Maeda praised the variety, while Tarbet praised their "not only believable but realistic" motivations. Beard said the series has "memorable" characters, comparing Shio's personality to Gon Freecss from Hunter × Hunter. Zaki Zakaria of The Star commented that "the chemistry between Shio and Matsuda, despite requiring more work, is charming." On the other hand, Kusek asserted "I don't really think Shio is that strong of a lead", and Bennet criticized the non-development of the characters' relationships. Smith highlighted its post-apocalyptic setting as a reason to continue reading, but Douresseaux affirmed, "It's also a typical post-apocalyptic sci-fi series with the Mad Max-type violence watered down for young readers." Tarbet wrote that its mithology is the most appealing characteristic of the series and praised the battle scenes involving other characters than Shio. The action was also praised by Publishers Weekly, Ellingwood, Maeda, Santos, and Zakaria, who said "They are mandala-like battles of gorgeously drawn mechs straight out of the game Zone of the Enders, and of Gurren Lagann heights of crazy." Santos said it "does the remarkable" as reach "an epic finale" in only four volumes.
