= Yowamushi Pedal =

Japanese manga series

- First tankōbon volume cover, featuring Sakamichi Onoda

弱虫ペダル (Yowamushi Pedaru)
- Genre: Sports (Cycling)
- Manga
- Written by: Wataru Watanabe
- Published by: Akita Shoten
- English publisher: NA: Yen Press
- Imprint: Shōnen Champion Comics
- Magazine: Weekly Shōnen Champion
- Original run: February 21, 2008 – present
- Volumes: 100
Further information
Manga
Yowamushi Pedal: Spare Bike
Written by	Wataru Watanabe
Published by	Akita Shoten
Imprint	Shōnen Champion Comics
Magazine	Weekly Shōnen Champion (2012–2013); Bessatsu Shōnen Champion (2014–present)
Original run	16 August 2012 – present
Volumes	15
Anime television series
Directed by	Osamu Nabeshima
Written by	Reiko Yoshida (S1–2); Kurasumi Sunayama (S3–5)
Music by	Kan Sawada
Studio	TMS Entertainment: 8PAN (S1–4); Die4Studio (S5)
Licensed by	Crunchyroll (streaming); AUS: Madman Entertainment; NA: Discotek Media (home video); SEA: Muse Communication
Original network	TXN (TV Tokyo), AT-X, NBC (S1–4); MRT (S3); NHK General TV (S5)
Original run	October 7, 2013 – March 25, 2023
Episodes	137 + OVA
Anime film
Yowamushi Pedal Re:Ride
Directed by	Osamu Nabeshima
Written by	Reiko Yoshida
Music by	Kan Sawada
Studio	TMS Entertainment
Licensed by	NA: Discotek Media
Released	September 19, 2014
Runtime	90 minutes
Video game
Yowamushi Pedal Asu e no High Cadence
Developer	Bandai Namco Games
Publisher	Bandai Namco Games
Genre	Adventure
Platform	Nintendo 3DS
Released	JP: January 29, 2015
Anime film
Yowamushi Pedal Re:Road
Directed by	Osamu Nabeshima
Written by	Reiko Yoshida
Music by	Kan Sawada
Studio	TMS/8PAN
Licensed by	NA: Discotek Media
Released	June 12, 2015
Runtime	89 minutes
Anime film
Yowamushi Pedal: The Movie
Directed by	Norihiro Naganuma
Written by	Reiko Yoshida
Music by	Kan Sawada
Studio	TMS/8PAN
Licensed by	AUS: Madman Entertainment; NA: Discotek Media
Released	August 28, 2015
Runtime	90 minutes
Television drama
Directed by	Takayoshi Tanazawa
Written by	Kōta Fukihara
Original network	BS SKY PerfecTV!
Original run	August 26, 2016 – October 7, 2016
Episodes	7
Anime film
Yowamushi Pedal: Spare Bike
Directed by	Osamu Nabeshima
Music by	Kan Sawada
Studio	TMS/8PAN
Released	September 9, 2016
Runtime	60 minutes
Anime film
Yowamushi Pedal: Re:Generation
Directed by	Osamu Nabeshima
Music by	Kan Sawada
Studio	TMS/8PAN
Released	October 13, 2017
Runtime	90 minutes
Live-action film
Directed by	Kōichirō Miki
Written by	Kōichirō Miki
Music by	Masaru Yokoyama
Studio	Shochiku
Released	August 14, 2020
Runtime	112 minutes
Manga
Hōkago Pedal High Cadence
Written by	Kineko Abekawa; ikra; Yukiko Tōno; Wataru Midori
Published by	Akita Shoten
Magazine	Monthly Princess
Original run	February 6, 2023 – present
- icon

Yowamushi Pedal (Japanese: 弱虫ペダル, Hepburn: Yowamushi Pedaru; lit. 'Weakling Pedal') is a Japanese manga series written and illustrated by Wataru Watanabe. It began serialization in the 12th issue of Akita Shoten's shōnen manga magazine Weekly Shōnen Champion in 2008. The series has been compiled into 100 tankōbon volumes as of May 2026. The manga has been licensed in North America by Yen Press since 2015.

An anime television series adaptation aired from October 2013 to July 2014, followed by a second season aired from October 2014 to March 2015, a third season aired from January to June 2017, a fourth season aired from January to June 2018, and a fifth season premiered in October 2022. The first three seasons have been licensed by Discotek Media in North America in 2014. A live-action television drama adaptation aired in August 2016. A live-action film adaptation was released on August 14, 2020.

By July 2026, Yowamushi Pedal had over 35 million copies in circulation, making it one of the best-selling manga series. In 2015, the manga won the Best Shōnen Manga award at the 39th Kodansha Manga Awards.

== Plot ==
Sakamichi Onoda is an otaku who has just entered high school. In middle school, Onoda did not have any friends with whom he could talk about his interests, and hopes to change that by joining his new school's anime club. However, he is crushed when he discovers the anime club has been disbanded due to lack of interest, and in order to reestablish the club, four new members must join.

Since he was a little boy, Onoda has ridden his city bicycle (referred to as a "mamachari", meaning "Mommy Bike", in the anime)—a simple and bulky bicycle designed for short rides—for transportation and fun. A fellow freshman, and much more serious cyclist, named Shunsuke Imaizumi notices Onoda riding his mamachari and mocks him inwardly until he sees Onoda riding up a steep hill with little effort. Another student named Naruko visits Akihabara to get some plastic Gundam models for his younger brothers and meets Onoda, who catches his attention because of his cycling skill on the mamachari. Later on, both Naruko and Imaizumi try to convince him to join the bicycle racing club at their high school, Sohoku.

== Teams and characters ==
=== Sohoku High School ===
Sohoku is a hard-working team that acts as the main school in the story. The team is characterized as being able to overcome internal conflicts and brutal training. For example, Sohoku hosts an intense and gruelling 1000 km training camp every year to determine who will advance to the main race of the series, the Inter-High.

Sakamichi Onoda (小野田 坂道, Onoda Sakamichi)
Voiced by: Daiki Yamashita
Live action actor: Yuki Ogoe (TV Series), Ren Nagase (Movie)
Onoda is the main protagonist of the series, a first-year high school student, and a member of the Sohoku High Bicycle Club. His personality is initially characterized as being a shy otaku with a difficulty in speaking up for himself. However, after joining the bicycle club, his confidence receives a dramatic boost, and the love and admiration he has for his fellow teammates becomes apparent. Since the very beginning of the series, Onoda shows stamina when riding uphill, and thus, the captain of the team, Kinjou, makes Onoda one of the team's climbers. To nurture Onoda's ability to climb for long periods of time, Kinjou assigns Makishima, a fellow climber and third-year, to tutor him. Onoda's best cycling ability, the team finds out, is that he performs best when chasing someone in the lead. When Onoda enters the Inter-High, he performs amazing feats for his team such as passing more than 100 cyclists after a crash and drafting Tadokoro, who was recovering from stomach pain, for almost 70km from the back of the race to the front where the rest of the team is.
Shunsuke Imaizumi (今泉 俊輔, Imaizumi Shunsuke)
Voiced by: Kōsuke Toriumi
Live action actor: Tatsunari Kimura (TV Series), Kentaro Ito (Movie)
Imaizumi is a popular first-year high school student and a member of the Sohoku High Bicycle Club. Imaizumi is a logical thinker with a generally dry personality, although, when entangled in certain situations, he can become quite frenzied and passionate. Because he dreams of one day becoming the fastest cyclist in the world, his cycling style is defined as an all-rounder. Because of Imaizumi's customarily coarse personality, his relationship with his teammates varies from person to person. For example, he has an intense rivalry with fellow teammate Naruko because of his sprinting abilities and overall attitude, likewise, he sees the captain, Kinjou, as his biggest obstacle. On the other hand, Imaizumi is seen being fairly gentle and kind towards Onoda.
Shoukichi Naruko (鳴子 章吉, Naruko Shōkichi)
Voiced by: Jun Fukushima
Live action actor: Taiga Fukuzawa (TV Series); Ryota Bando (Movie)
Naruko is a first-year high school student from Osaka, and a member of the Sohoku High Bicycle Club. Naruko's personality is sharp, spunky, and highly competitive, however, he takes cycling very seriously, and often gets very upset if he is defeated in a race, even if it is by another teammate. He is a high-energy sprinter, and his vitality often gets fueled by his mentor, Tadokoro, a fellow sprinter and third-year, who he affectionately refers to as "old man." He maintains a friendly rivalry with Imaizumi, and is always supportive and caring towards Onoda.
Shingo Kinjou (金城 真護, Kinjō Shingo)
Voiced by: Hiroki Yasumoto
Live action actor: Naoya Goumoto (TV Series), Ryo Ryusei (Movie)
Kinjou is a sunglasses-wielding third-year high school student and captain of the Sohoku High Bicycle Club. He is an all-rounder cyclist with an amazing iron will in addition to being Sohoku's ace. Kinjou comes off as having an icy personality, but throughout the series, he continuously shows that he has the best intentions for his team at heart. Kinjou works incredibly hard to bring out the best in everyone's cycling abilities, especially Imaizumi, who he considers his mentee.
Yuusuke Makishima (巻島 裕介, Makishima Yūsuke)
Voiced by: Showtaro Morikubo
Live action actor: Ryōma Baba (TV Series), Shuntaro Yanagi (Movie)
Makishima is a third-year high school student and member of the Sohoku High Bicycle Team. Makishima is the ace climber of the team and has the nickname of "Peak Spider" due to his unusual dancing technique when cycling uphill. His generally awkward personality, in addition to his strange looks, makes Makishima seem unapproachable or even frightening. However, throughout the series, he offers wise advice to his mentee, Onoda, about cycling. Makishima is also well known for having a longtime, intimate rivalry with Hakone's ace climber, Toudou.
Jin Tadokoro (田所 迅, Tadokoro Jin)
Voiced by: Kentarō Itō
Live action actor: Yūki Tomotsune (TV Series), Ken Sugawara (Movie)
Tadokoro is a third-year high school student and member of the Sohoku High Bicycle Team. Despite his bulkiness, he is the team's ace sprinter, and oftentimes throughout the series, takes advantage of his large body to perform his signature riding style "Human Bullet Train", where he drafts wind for the team as they ride behind him. He is sometimes seen as the "fatherly" member of the team, having been a mentor to Naruko, Teshima, and Aoyagi.
Junta Teshima (手島 純太, Teshima Junta)
Voiced by: Daisuke Kishio
Live action actor: Kousuke Kujirai
Teshima is a second-year high school student and member of the Sohoku High Bicycle Club. Teshima is a climber who works as a duo with fellow teammate Aoyagi. During the 1000 km training camp, he injures his legs in the final stretch and loses to the first-years, thus losing a spot in the Inter-High. He has an outgoing, cheerful, yet serious personality that never fails to keep the other members in high spirits. Teshima is most noted for having a very close relationship with Aoyagi, a fellow second-year. He is often seen "reading Aoyagi's mind", and knowing how Aoyagi is feeling or what he wants without him having to speak or show facial expressions. Teshima becomes the new captain of the club as the third-years leave.
Hajime Aoyagi (青八木 一, Aoyagi Hajime)
Voiced by: Yoshitsugu Matsuoka
Live action actor: Ryō Yashima
Aoyagi is a second-year high school student and member of the Sohoku High Bicycle Club. Aoyagi is an all-rounder rider who works as a duo with fellow teammate Teshima. He considers himself to be "unskilled", but usually manages to claim first place in races with Teshima's help. However, like Teshima, he injures himself in the final stretch of the 1000 km training camp and loses a spot in the Inter-High. Aoyagi is a very quiet boy who spends most of his time with Teshima, however, it is not uncommon to see him grow more vocal in stressful situations. Aoyagi becomes the new vice-captain of the club as the third-years leave.
Terufumi Sugimoto (杉元 照文, Sugimoto Terufumi)
Voiced by: Kōki Miyata
Live action actor: Hiroki Harai (TV Series), Mizuki Inoue (Movie)
Sugimoto is a first-year high school student and member of the Sohoku High Bicycle Club. He avidly claims to be an "experienced rider", and often offers advice to the fellow first-years. However, his actual skills are very slim, and he does not even fall into an all-rounder, climber, or sprinter category. His lack of skill becomes even more apparent when he fails to complete the 1000 km training camp because he refused to cycle in the rain. In the case of Onoda, Sugimoto's advice is given not out of ego but a genuine desire to be helpful. With Onoda being very new to the sport, Sugimoto's explanations of the basics greatly benefited him, for which he remains grateful for.
Kimitaka Koga (古賀 公貴, Koga Kimitaka)
Voiced by: Yuichi Nakamura
Koga Kimitaka is a second-year high school student and member of the Sohoku High Bicycle Club. It is later revealed that he sustained injuries in the previous Inter-High, leading to his withdrawal the 1000 km training camp to recover. His nickname is the "Stamina Simpleton", for his seemingly unending stamina, which he demonstrates by scouting the entire route of the 42nd Inter-High by himself.
Issa Kaburagi (鏑木 一差, Kaburagi Issa)
Voiced by: Hiro Shimono
Sadatoki Sugimoto (杉元 定時, Sugimoto Sadatoki)
Voiced by: Mitsuhiro Ichiki
Sugimoto Sadatoki is Terufumi Sugimoto Younger Brother and is a first-year high school student and member of the Sohoku High Bicycle Club.
Ryuuhou Danchiku (段竹 竜包, Danchiku Ryūhō)
Voiced by: Wataru Hatano
Gorizou (ゴリ蔵, Gorizō)
Voiced by: Kanuka Mitsuaki

=== Hakone Academy ===
Hakone Academy is the country's largest cycling team, and claims to be made up of "six aces" with many more in reserve. During the first year of the series, it was noted to have 50 club members. Since Hakone is such an expansive team, the selection process of who does, and does not, go to the Inter-High is quite complex. To determine who has the honor of participating in the Inter-High, all of the members race against each other, and only the winners of each group (A – F), are allowed to participate. Furthermore, these groups are divided so that the team takes three all-rounders, two climbers, and up to two sprinters to the Inter-High.

Sangaku Manami (真波 山岳, Manami Sangaku)
Voiced by: Tsubasa Yonaga
Live action actor: Keisuke Ueda
Manami is a first-year high school student and a member of the Hakone Academy Bicycle Club. Manami is very easy-going and easily distracted by nature, cycling, and the feeling of complete freedom. He is the mentee climber to third-year, Toudou, and serves as Hakone's second climber during the Inter-High. Though for different reasons, Onoda and he have a similar joy for climbing hills and the two hit it off almost immediately as friends and competitors. His most notable feature is that people hallucinate seeing wings on his back when he reaches his top speeds during a race. He accomplishes this by reading the wind conditions, then shifts upwards and dances when gusts come up from behind. His skill allowed him to win his club heats and join the Inter-High team, the first first-year to do so in the club's history.
Jinpachi Toudou (東堂 尽八, Tōdō Jinpachi)
Voiced by: Tetsuya Kakihara
Live action actor: Ryo Kitamura
Toudou is a popular third-year student and a member of the Hakone Academy Bicycle Club. Toudou is the ace climber of Hakone, and mentor to first-year, Manami. His climbing style is fast and silent, and combined with his good looks, gives him the nickname "Sleeping Beauty", as he manages to sneak up on cyclists in front of him and pass them without their knowledge. His personality is very pompous, and he thinks very highly of himself. Toudou has many female fans who tend to inflate his ego, however, his strong relationship with Sohoku's ace climber, Makishima, who he affectionately calls "Maki-chan", tends to mellow him out again. Toudou is most often noted for his very intimate rivalry with Makishima.
Juichi Fukutomi (福富 寿一, Fukutomi Juichi)
Voiced by: Tomoaki Maeno
Live action actor: Eiji Takigawa
Fukutomi is a third-year high school student and captain of the Hakone Academy Bicycle Club. Fukutomi is an all-rounder and ace of the team. His serious, straightforward personality and unchanging expression has earned him the nickname "Iron Mask." In addition to being remembered as the ace of Hakone, he is known for getting distraught during a past race and injuring himself and Sohoku's Kinjou, with whom he has had a longtime rivalry. This makes him resolve to win against Sohoku in this years match, hoping it will be atonement for what he did. Throughout the Inter-High, he is often seen sporting his catchphrase, "I'm strong."
Hayato Shinkai (新開 隼人, Shinkai Hayato)
Voiced by: Satoshi Hino
Live action actor: Shuto Miyazaki
Shinkai is a third-year high school student and member of the Hakone Academy Bicycle Club. Shinkai is the team's ace sprinter, and claims to have a "monster locked up inside of him" that gets "released" during especially stressful races. Shinkai's personality is usually relaxed and easy-going, and he is often seen with a power bar in his mouth and striking his signature "bakyun!" pose. In a past race, Shinkai ran over and killed a mother rabbit, leaving an orphaned kit who he then adopted. Because of his guilt, Shinkai stopped cycling for his team transiently, and became unable to pass other riders during races on the left side since that was what happened when he killed the rabbit. Although he is the ace sprinter, it was decided it would be best for him to not participate in the first sprinters race (first check point) during day one of the Inter high race and have Izumida represent their team during that day. Later he would race against Midousuji during the second one on the second day.
Yasutomo Arakita (荒北 靖友, Arakita Yasutomo)
Voiced by: Hiroyuki Yoshino
Live action actor: Hiroki Suzuki
Arakita is a third-year high school student and member of the Hakone Academy Bicycle Club. Arakita is a skilled, albeit reckless, all-rounder cycler who was introduced to cycling in high school by Fukutomi; he had never ridden one previously, instead racing around on a scooter. He had originally chosen to attend Hakone Gakuen because it did not have a baseball club; an elbow injury prevented him from playing. His personality is described as wolf-like, and he generally seems very unapproachable. However, since joining the bicycle club, he has formed a strong bond with Fukutomi, and affectionately calls him "Fuku-chan." During the race, he pairs up with Onoda and Manami to get out of a pinch, and from then on starts calling Onoda "Onoda-chan", seemingly since he gets fond of Onoda's honest personality and pure desire to catch up.
Touichirou Izumida (泉田 塔一郎, Izumida Tōichirō)
Voiced by: Atsushi Abe
Live action actor: Soramu Aoki
Izumida is a second-year high school student and member of the Hakone Academy Bicycle Club. Izumida is the team's second year sprinter who often receives "warnings" about dangerous situations during races from his pecs, Andy and Frank (named after the famous pro bicycle racers from Luxembourg, brothers Andy Schleck and Fränk Schleck.) In the 2017 season, he starts calling upon his upper dorsal muscle, that he's called Fabian (after pro Swiss bicycle racer Fabian Cancellara.) He is quite vain and cares a lot about his appearance, which becomes obvious as he is seen throughout the series doing a tough workout routine. When racing, Izumida usually rides without holding his handlebars, and only zips up his jersey when he gets serious. When producing an effort, he chants "Abs, abs, abs, abs...!", a call of support to his chiseled abs. He greatly admires the teams ace sprinter, Hayato Shinkai.
Yukinari Kuroda (黒田 雪成, Kuroda Yukinari)
Voiced by: Kenji Nojima
Live action actor: Ryūtarō Akimoto
Kuroda is a second-year high school student and member of the Hakone Academy Bicycle Club. In the race to see who competed in the Inter-High, he loses to first-year, and fellow climber, Manami. In season 3, when he became a third year, he became the second climber along with Manami as Arakita, Fukutomi, Toudou, and Shinkai graduated.

=== Kyoto Fushimi High School ===
Kyoto Fushimi, or Kyofushi, acts as the third squad in this series and is the wild card of the main three teams. The team has a history as a strong team, where 1st year cyclists would go to become stronger. Its training practices are unknown, but other teams say they were a lot nicer in previous years before Midousuji joined the team.

Akira Midousuji (御堂筋 翔, Midōsuji Akira)
Voiced by: Kōji Yusa
Live action actor: Mitsu Murata
Midousuji is a first-year high school student and member of the Kyoto Fushimi Bicycle Club. Midousuji is an all-rounder, and he is the newfound ace of the team. He is the best climber against all all-rounders in the team. His ruthless personality, paired with his ever-smiling face and habit of calling everything and everyone "gross", gives Midousuji an unapproachable and unsettling atmosphere. He's known by other teams for his tactical expertise, and plans out the events of a race in great detail while taking into account for nearly every possibility. He aims for international acclaim as the fastest cyclist, and will stop at nothing in the pursuit of victory. Midousuji is known for having a rivalry with Sohoku's Shunsuke Imaizumi. In the next year, he relinquished his role as Ace, and became Ace Assistant to Mizuta.
Koutarou Ishigaki (石垣 光太郎, Ishigaki Kōtarō)
Voiced by: Hirofumi Nojima
Ishigaki is a third-year high school student and captain of the Kyoto Fushimi Bicycle Club. Ishigaki is an all-rounder and, before Midousuji joined the team, was the ace. With his position as ace taken from him, he becomes Midousuji's assist. Though he initially dislikes Midousuji, he comes to understand him better over the duration of the 41st Inter-high and aims to do anything he can to see Midousuji grow as a person and win.
Nobuyuki Mizuta (水田 信行, Mizuta Nobuyuki)
Voiced by: Chihiro Suzuki
Mizuta is a second-year high school student and member of the Kyoto Fushimi Bicycle Club. He is an all-rounder. Mizuta is very easily influenced by those who he admires. Before Midousuji joined the team, he greatly admired Ishigaki and styled his hair just like his. However, once Midousuji joined the team, Mizuta began to admire him for his cycling strength and attempts to imitate Midousuji, getting braces to straighten out his teeth and even imitating some of his odd quirks. Mizuta seeks recognition from those he admires and will do whatever he can to obtain it.
Tomoya Ihara (井原 友矢, Ihara Tomoya)
Voiced by: Yukitoshi Kikuchi
Ihara is a third-year high school student and member of the Kyoto Fushimi Bicycle Club. Ihara is one of the team's sprinters and is a friend of Ishigaki's. He was quick to reject Midousuji as the team's ace and even rallied against it, only to fall into place for the sake of his team.
Noriyuki Yamaguchi (山口 紀之, Yamaguchi Noriyuki)
Voiced by: Yuta Odagaki
Yamaguchi is a second-year high school student and member of the Kyoto Fushimi Bicycle Club. Yamaguchi is a sprinter and avoids conflict within his team, giving him a quiet, passive demeanor.
Akihisa Tsuji (辻 明久, Tsuji Akihisa)
Voiced by: Katsuhiro Tokuishi
Tsuji is a third-year high school student and member of the Kyoto Fushimi Bicycle Club. Tsuji is a climber with a stoic demeanor and serious expression, and tries to avoid conflict within his team.

=== Hiroshima Kureminami Technical High School ===
Hiroshima is known to have no all-rounders, and 3 sprinters.

Eikichi Machimiya (待宮 栄吉, Machimiya Eikichi)
Voiced by: Tomokazu Seki
Eikichi is a third-year high school student and member of the Kureminami Bicycle Club. Eikichi cycling style is sprinting, and he also serves as the ace for his team. He is well known for having a rivalry with the entirety of Hakone, as well as having the nickname "The Fighting Dog of Kure." He manipulated the pack full of sprinter on day 3 to get back to the pack, but when Hiroshima broke away, they left out of steam in the mountain sections and completely dropped out.

=== Supporting characters ===
Touji Kanzaki (寒咲 通司, Kanzaki Toji)
Voiced by: Junichi Suwabe
Live action actor: Yūya Asato
Touji is the eldest sibling of the Kanzakis and is the former captain of Sohoku. During his cycling career he was a sprinter, although he currently runs his family's bicycle shop and supports the current members of Sohoku.
Miki Kanzaki (寒咲 幹, Kanzaki Miki)
Voiced by: Ayaka Suwa
Live action actor: Minami Sakurai (TV Series), Kanna Hashimoto (Movie)
Miki is a first-year high school student at Sohoku as well as the younger sibling to Touji. The family business resulted in her being passionate about bicycles and extensive knowledge about road racing, even though she's not a racer herself. She works in the shop as another mechanic on her off hours. She joins the Sohoku High Bicycle Club as team manager, and is often seen at their racing events supporting the team.
Aya Tachibana (橘 綾, Tachibana Aya)
Voiced by: Megumi Han
Tachibana is a first-year high school student at Sohoku, member of the tennis club, and close friend to Miki.
Mr. Pierre (Mr.ピエール, Mr. Pierre)
Voiced by: Kenyu Horiuchi
Pierre is the coach of the Sohoku High Bicycle Club and is most noted for giving Onoda tips on being a better cyclist. He is Caucasian and an English teacher on Sohoku's teaching staff. He sometimes peppers the occasional English word in his sentences.
Miyahara (宮原, Miyahara)
Voiced by: China Kitahara
Miyahara is a first-year high school student and president of Manami's class at Hakone Academy. She has been friends with Manami since childhood and is well known for having a crush on him.
Kotori Himeno (姫野 湖鳥, Himeno Kotori)
Voiced by: Yukari Tamura
Himeno is the main character of Onoda's favorite anime series, Love Hime. Onoda is often seen singing the opening to the series, "Koi no Hime Hime Pettanko", when he needs to raise his cadence and spirits.

== Media ==
=== Manga ===
Yowamushi Pedal is written and illustrated by Wataru Watanabe, and the manga began serialization in the 12th issue of Akita Shoten's shōnen manga magazine Weekly Shōnen Champion on February 21, 2008. The series was later published in tankōbon format by Akita Shoten, with the first volume being released on July 8, 2008. As of May 2026, 100 volumes have been published.

The manga is published in English by Yen Press in North America, who are releasing the series as two-in-one omnibuses. The first omnibus volume was released on December 15, 2015.

A tribute anthology manga titled Hōkago Pedal High Cadence began serialization in Akita Shoten's Monthly Princess magazine on February 6, 2023.

=== Anime ===
The first season of Yowamushi Pedal, produced by TMS Entertainment aired from October 7, 2013, to July 1, 2014, on TV Tokyo. The second season, Yowamushi Pedal Grande Road, aired from October 6, 2014, to March 30, 2015, in Japan. A third season, titled Yowamushi Pedal: New Generation, was announced on October 6, 2015, at a film screening of Yowamushi Pedal: The Movie, which aired from January 10 to June 26, 2017. The fourth season, titled Yowamushi Pedal: Glory Line, aired from January 8 to June 25, 2018. A fifth season, titled Yowamushi Pedal: Limit Break, premiered on October 10, 2022, on NHK General TV.

Preceding the first season is an original animation DVD titled Yowamushi Pedal: Special Ride, which was released as part of the limited edition of the manga's 29th volume on August 8, 2013.

A short ONA series, titled Chiba Pedal: Learning Bicycle Traffic Safety with Yowamushi Pedal (ちばペダル 〜弱虫ペダルと学ぶ自転車交通安全〜, Chiba Pedal: Yowamushi Pedal to Manabu Jitensha Koutsuu Anzen), was released online from July 1 to September 9, 2016. The series was produced as a collaboration ad campaign for bicycle safety in Chiba Prefecture.

In North America, Discotek Media licensed the first two seasons of the series within the region, and Crunchyroll simulcast the series on their service. Crunchyroll is also the master English licensee of the third season of the series worldwide. In Australia and New Zealand, Madman Entertainment acquired the home media and streaming rights for the first two seasons, and streamed the series on AnimeLab.

==== Theme songs ====
Opening theme

- "Reclimb" (リクライム, Rikuraimu) by Rookiez is Punk'd – Episodes 1–12
- "Yowamushi na Honoo" (弱虫な炎) by Dirty Old Men – Episodes 13–25
- "Be as One" by Team Sohoku – Episodes 26–38
- "Determination" by Lastgasp – Grande Road, episodes 1–12
- "Remind" (リマインド, Rimaindo) by Rookiez is Punk'd – Grande Road, episodes 13–24
- "Cadence" (ケイデンス Keidensu) by Natsushiro Takaaki – New Generation, episodes 1–12
- "Transit" (トランジット Toranjitto) by Natsushiro Takaaki – New Generation, episodes 13–24
- "Boku no Koe" by Rhythmic Toy World – Glory Line, episodes 1–12
- "Dancing" by Saeki YouthK – Glory Line, episodes 13–25
- "Keep Going" by 04 Limited Sazabys – Limit Break, episodes 1–13
- "Last Scene" (ラストシーン) by Novelbright – Limit Break, episodes 14–24

Ending theme

- "Top of Tops!" by Miki Kanzaki (Ayaka Suwa) – OVA
- "Kaze o Yobe" (風を呼べ) by Under Graph – Episodes 1–12
- "I'm Ready" by Autribe feat. Dirty Old Men – Episodes 13–25
- "Glory Road" by Team Hakone Academy – Episodes 26–38
- "DAYS" by Lastgasp – Re:Ride movie
- "Realize" (リアライズ, Riaraizu) by Rookiez is Punk'd – Grande Road, episodes 1–12
- "Eikō e no Ichibyō" (栄光への一秒; "One Second to Glory") by Magic of Life – Grande Road, episodes 12–24
- "Believer" by Lastgasp – Re:Road movie
- "Link" by Lastgasp – Yowamushi Pedal: The Movie
- "Now Or Never" (ナウオアネバー) by Saeki Yuusuke – New Generation, episodes 1–12
- "Takai Tokoro" (タカイトコロ) by Saeki Yuusuke – New Generation, episodes 13–24
- "Carry the Hope" by THE HIGH CADENCE – Glory Line, episodes 1–12
- "Over the Limit" by ROUTE85 – Glory Line, episodes 13–25
- "PRIDE" by Novelbright – Limit Break, episodes 1–13
- "Action" (アクション) by Yamashita Daiki – Limit Break, episodes 14–25

Insert Song

- "Koi no Hime Hime Pettanko" (恋のヒメヒメぺったんこ) by Kotori Himeno (Yukari Tamura) – Episodes 3, 5, 11, and 26, and Grande Road episode 24

=== Films ===
Yowamushi Pedal: Re:Ride and Yowamushi Pedal: Re:Road recap the first two seasons of the anime with additional new content.

Yowamushi Pedal: The Movie (劇場版 弱虫ペダル, Gekijōban Yowamushi Pedaru?), which was released on August 28, 2015. The film was released on Malaysia on January 7, 2016.

Yowamushi Pedal: Re:Generation is a recap film of the third season.

An anime theatrical film adaptation of the Yowamushi Pedal: Spare Bike spin-off manga premiered in Japanese theaters for 2 weeks, starting September 9, 2016. The movie tells the backstory of the third-year students.

In May 2019, Discotek Media announced the acquisition of Yowamushi Pedal: Re:Ride and Yowamushi Pedal: Re:Road for a BD release on July 30.

A live-action film adaptation of the manga was announced and set to premiere on August 14, 2020, it is directed by Kōichirō Miki.

=== Video games ===
A collector mobile game, titled Yowamushi Pedal: Puchitto Racers (弱虫ペダルぷちっとレーサーズ), developed by FuRyu, was available for iOS and Android from July 30, 2015, to February 28, 2017.

In February 2023, it was announced that a browser game adaptation, titled Yowamushi Pedal: Dream Race, is set to be released on the game service platform G123.

=== Television drama ===
A live-action television drama adaptation of the manga was announced in the Weekly Shōnen Champion magazine's 26th issue of 2016 and premiered in August 2016 on BS SKY PerfecTV! The series is directed by Takayoshi Tanazawa and written by Kōta Fukihara.

A sequel premiered on August 18, 2017, on BS SKY PerfecTV!. The series is also simulcasted with its Japanese broadcast on WakuWaku Japan in Indonesia, Myanmar, Singapore, Taiwan, Sri Lanka, and Mongolia.

During the filming of the sequel, Eiji Takigawa received spinal injuries after crashing into a curb, and was taken to the nearest hospital in a helicopter. Immediately after the accident, he was unable to move any body part below the head, but slowly regained movement in his arms. He was released from hospital in October 2018, 13 months after the accident.

== Reception ==
=== Manga ===
The Yowamushi Pedal manga won the Best Shōnen Manga award along with The Seven Deadly Sins manga at the 39th Kodansha Manga Awards in 2015.

By May 2017, the manga had 17 million copies in circulation; over 27 million copies in circulation by July 2021; and over 28 million copies in circulation by September 2022.

== See also ==
- List of films about bicycles and cycling
- Nasu: Summer in Andalusia
- Magimoji Rurumo, another manga series by the same author
