= Ryu Fujisaki =

Japanese manga artist

Ryu Fujisaki 藤崎 竜
- Born: March 10, 1971 (age 55) Kawauchi, Aomori Prefecture, Japan
- Area: Manga artist
- Notable works: Hoshin Engi

Ryu Fujisaki (藤崎 竜, Fujisaki Ryū) is a Japanese manga artist from Mutsu, Aomori Prefecture.

He won prizes in the 39th and the 40th Tezuka Awards. He made his professional manga debut with WORLDS in 1990. All of his works are published by Shueisha under their Shōnen Jump labels. He has also illustrated four light novels and released two comprehensive art books across his career.

Fujisaki is best known for the series Hoshin Engi, which was adapted into an anime series in 1999 and again in 2018 as well as several radio dramas and video games. He also adapted the novel Shiki written by Fuyumi Ono into a manga which in turn was adapted into an anime. More recently he is making a manga adaptation of the Legend of the Galactic Heroes novel series.

Both Hōshin Engi and Wāqwāq were released in English by Viz Media.

== Works ==
=== Manga ===
- Psycho+ (1992–1993), serialized in Weekly Shōnen Jump, 2 volumes
  - Includes in second volume shorts: Source of Infection (1993, Summer Shōnen Jump special edition) and Digitalian (1993, Autumn Shōnen Jump special edition)
- Hoshin Engi (封神演義) (1996–2000), serialized in Weekly Shōnen Jump, 23 volumes
- Sakuratetsu Taiwahen (サクラテツ対話篇) (2002), serialized in Weekly Shōnen Jump, 2 volumes
- Wāqwāq (ワークワーク) (2004–2005), serialized in Weekly Shōnen Jump, 4 volumes
- Shiki (屍鬼) (2008–2011), serialized in Jump Square, 11 volumes
- Kakuriyo Monogatari (かくりよものがたり) (2013–2015), serialized in Weekly Young Jump, 8 volumes
- Legend of the Galactic Heroes (銀河英雄伝説) (2015–2026), serialized in Weekly Young Jump (2015–2020) and Ultra Jump (2020–2026), 35 volumes

==== Shorter works ====
- Worlds–Short Story Collection
  - Pied Piper of Hamelin (ハメルンの笛吹き) (1990); received an honorable mention in the 39th Tezuka Awards
  - Worlds (1990/1991), published in Winter Shōnen Jump special edition; received second prize in the 40th Tezuka Awards
  - Tight Rope (1991), published in Spring Shōnen Jump special edition
  - Shadow Disease (1991), published in Weekly Shōnen Jump
  - Soul of Knight (1992), published in Spring Shōnen Jump special edition
- Dramatic Irony–Short Story Collection
  - Dramatic Irony (1995), published in Spring Shōnen Jump special edition
  - Yugamizumu (1997) published in Weekly Shōnen Jump
  - Milk Junkie (1999)
  - Houshin Engi Another Story (2001), published in Weekly Shōnen Jump
- Tenkyūgi (天球儀) (2005), published in Jump the Revolution!

=== Illustrations ===
- Putitakityu (artbook)
- Shiki (guidebook)
- Hoshin Taizen (guidebook)
- Fuusui Tengi (light novel)
- Nemuri Hime ha Mahou wo Tsukau (light novel)
- Ripper Game (light novel)
- D Shitsu no Koneko no Bouken (light novel)

=== Games ===
- Senkaiden Hoshin Engi Senkai Ibunroku Juntei Taisen (GBC)
- Senkaiden Hoshin Engi Yori (Wonderswan)
- Senkaiden Hoshin Engi Yori 2 (Wonderswan)
- Senkai Taisen: Senkaiden Hoshin Engi Yori (PlayStation)
- Senkai Tsuuroku Seishi: Senkaiden Hoshin Engi Yori (PlayStation)
- Jump Ultimate Stars (Hōshin Engi characters only)
- Phantasy Star Portable 2 (collaboration)

=== Other ===
- Kyousei Majin Guririn Puncher (character design)
