= Shiki (novel) =

1998 Japanese horror novel by Fuyumi Ono

- Cover of the first novel volume

屍鬼
- Genre: Mystery; Psychological thriller; Vampire horror
- Serial novel
- Written by: Fuyumi Ono
- Published by: Shinchosha
- Published: September 1998 (original); January 30 – February 28, 2002 (reprint)
- Volumes: 2 (original); 5 (reprint)
- Manga
- Written by: Fuyumi Ono
- Illustrated by: Ryu Fujisaki
- Published by: Shueisha
- Imprint: Jump Comics SQ.
- Magazine: Jump Square
- Original run: December 4, 2007 – June 3, 2011
- Volumes: 11
- Anime television series
- Directed by: Tetsurō Amino
- Produced by: Ai Abe; Takamitsu Inoue; Noriko Ozaki; Hideo Isono
- Written by: Kenji Sugihara
- Music by: Yasuharu Takanashi
- Studio: Daume
- Licensed by: AUS: Siren Visual; NA: Funimation (expired)
- Original network: Fuji TV (Noitamina)
- Original run: July 8, 2010 – December 30, 2010
- Episodes: 22 + 2 OVAs
- icon

Shiki (屍鬼; "Corpse Demon" or "Death Spirit") is a Japanese horror novel written by Fuyumi Ono. It was originally published in two parts by Shinchosha in 1998, and was then reprinted into five parts in 2002. The story is about a small Japanese village named Sotoba, which is plagued by bizarre deaths caused by what seemed to be an epidemic. However, when Toshio Ozaki, the hospital dean, performs his own investigations, he discovers vampires, known as "Shiki" ("Corpse Demon" in English) living in their midst.

A manga series adaptation, illustrated by Ryu Fujisaki, was serialized in Shueisha's monthly shōnen manga magazine Jump Square from December 2007 to June 2011, with its chapters collected in eleven tankōbon volumes. An anime television series adaptation of the manga, produced by Daume, aired on Fuji TV from July to December 2010. The series was simulcast by Funimation on their online video portal and released the series on home video in May 2012.

== Plot ==
The story takes place during a particularly hot summer in 1994, in a small quiet Japanese village called Sotoba. A series of mysterious deaths begin to spread in the village, at the same time when a strange family moves into the long-abandoned Kanemasa mansion on top of a hill. Megumi Shimizu, a young girl who wanted to leave the village and move to the city, pays them a visit never to return. She is later found lying in the forest and tragically dies. Doctor Toshio Ozaki, director of Sotoba's only hospital, initially suspects an epidemic; however, as investigations continue and the deaths begin to pile up, he learns—and becomes convinced—that they are the work of the "Shiki", vampire-like creatures, plaguing the village. A young teenager named Natsuno Yuuki, who hates living in the village, begins to be pursued and becomes surrounded by death.

== Characters ==
=== Main characters ===
Natsuno Yuuki/Koide (結城/小出 夏野, Yuuki/Koide Natsuno)
Voiced by: Kōki Uchiyama (Japanese); Jerry Jewell (English)
A 15-year-old boy who lives and attends school in Sotoba. Though he prefers living in the city than in the country, Natsuno reluctantly moved to Sotoba with his parents when they wanted a change of environment. He has an estranged relationship with his father, since his parents reject social norms and are not married, causing him to have his mother's surname. He often exhibits a cold exterior, especially disliking Megumi Shimizu, who has a one-sided crush on him. He is kind and friendly toward those whom he considers his friends (Toru, Toru's younger siblings, and the Tanaka children). During the series, Natsuno dies after repeated attacks from the Shiki. In the manga and anime adaptations, he does not die initially, but becomes a Jinrou, a special kind of shiki that retains their human traits (going out during the day, eating normal food, etc). He dies in a fight with Tatsumi with dynamite, taking both Tatsumi's and his own life.
Toshio Ozaki (尾崎 敏夫, Ozaki Toshio)
Voiced by: Tōru Ōkawa (Japanese); David Wald (English)
The director of the hospital in Sotoba, Toshio resigned from university hospital, returning to take up his father's position when he died. He is fondly given a nickname, "Waka-sensei" (young doctor), by his colleagues as well as the residents. Toshio dislikes both his mother and his late father, as both of them often put the reputation of the Ozaki family before anything else. He is childhood friends with Seishin Muroi and Mikiyasu Yasumori. He is 32 years old; is married to a woman, Kyoko, whom he rarely sees; and he is a chain smoker. He is baffled by the mysterious deaths and swears to solve the case and protect his home village. During the series, his wife becomes a Shiki and Toshio uses her as an experiment to find out the Shikis' weakness. Later, he exposes the truth about Kirishikis and the victims of the "epidemic" becoming Shikis to the entire village (by murdering Chizuru). This causes a war between the human villagers and Shikis; resulting in setting the village on fire and leaving it to ruins. In the conclusion, he escapes the destroyed village, but wonders if all of his hard work to protect the village was all for nothing.
Sunako Kirishiki (桐敷 沙子, Kirishiki Sunako)
Voiced by: Aoi Yūki (Japanese); Cherami Leigh (English)
A 13-year-old girl who moves into the Kanemasa mansion atop the hill with her family. She is a very wise girl since she is the oldest of the Shiki, being over 100 years old. She became a Shiki after being attacked by a visitor, and after transforming was locked on the orders of her family in a storage closet and fed a stream of victims for several years before escaping. After escaping, she searched for her long lost family, only to give up and start a new "family". She claims to have a rare genetic disorder known as SLE, which forces her to stay inside her home during the day and only come out at night. She and her family are fans of the essays and novels written by Seishin Muroi, and is the reason they moved to Sotoba. She dislikes it when people call her name with the honorific "chan". At the conclusion of the series, Sunako is chased down into the abandoned church but is saved by Seishin (who is now a Jinrou). She states that she is "forsaken by God" and wishes to die, but Seishin convinces her to escape with him, saying that even though she is no longer under God's jurisdiction, Sunako never lost her faith in Him.
Seishin Muroi (室井 静信, Muroi Seishin)
Voiced by: Kazuyuki Okitsu (Japanese); John Burgmeier (English)
Seishin is the local priest in Sotoba, as well as an author of several novels. His current work is called Shiki (Corpse Demon in English). He has a sense of the supernatural and detects the presence of the real "Shiki" long before anybody else. He is childhood friends with Toshio Ozaki and Mikiyasu Yasumori. He is 32 years old, single, and once attempted to commit suicide in a drunken state during his university days. During the series, he finds out Toshio killed his Shiki-transformed wife and walks away from Toshio with disdain, ending their friendship. When the battle between the village and Shikis began, Seishin decides to help Sunako. He lets Tatsumi feed off of him, slowly becoming weak. Attempting to escape the village with Sunako, Seishin is severely wounded by a villager and knocked unconscious. He later awakens, having become a Jinrou, saving Sunako from being staked. Seishin convinces her to escape with him and begin a new life.

=== Secondary characters ===
Megumi Shimizu (清水 恵, Shimizu Megumi)
Voiced by: Haruka Tomatsu (Japanese); Tia Ballard (English)
An attractive 15 year old girl taking interest in fashion and attending the same school as Natsuno, Megumi also hates living in the village and longs for city life. She has bad status in the village among older people and often gets gossiped about due to her unique outfits she casually wears. She has a one-sided crush on Natsuno and often daydreams of a relationship with him. Megumi encounters the Kirishiki family in the beginning of the series, and disappears without a trace until the residents find her lying in the middle of the forest. She is thought to die from a complicated case of anemia and is later revived as a Shiki. After she was revived, she became much more malicious, using her new powers to stalk Natsuno and target people close to him. At the end she tries to escape to the city but gets caught by the villagers due to a nostalgic vision of Natsuno that distracts her.
Toru Muto (武藤 徹, Muto Tōru)
Voiced by: Nobuhiko Okamoto (Japanese); Chris Burnett (English)
He is the eighteen-year-old son of the director, Yuta Muto, of the Ozaki Clinic. He is the older brother of Aoi and Tamotsu, and Natsuno's best friend. He likes video games and has a kind of happy-go-lucky personality. He has a crush on one of the nurses, Kunihiro Ritsuko, who teaches him how to drive. He is killed by Megumi, as she was jealous of his closeness with Natsuno, but he then revives as a Shiki. He is a reluctant killer, consumed by the grief of killing his best friend. He is very subdued and seems more 'human' than many of the Shiki. Near the end of the series, he tries to force Ritsuko to kill her co-worker, Yasuyo but she refuses, stating it's against her nature. Not wanting to see Ritsuko in pain, he releases Yasuyo and spends his final moments holding Ritsuko's hand. When the village is set on ablaze, Natsuno sees their bodies, noting both Toru and Ritsuko were staked and put to peace.
Kaori Tanaka (田中 かおり, Tanaka Kaori)
Voiced by: Haruka Nagashima (Japanese); Alexis Tipton (English)
Kaori is Megumi's childhood friend. She is 15 years old, and is a friendly, kind girl who does not realize the fact that her best friend Megumi has grown to dislike her. She and her younger brother Akira start spying on the Kirishikis when Akira notices one of the villagers who was supposed to be dead alive near the Kanemasa mansion. During the series, Kaori is deranged when her brother goes missing and her mother has died. When her father (who has become a shiki) intrudes into the house, she kills him with a baseball bat. She later awakens in the hospital, reunited with Akira. They watch as their home village is destroyed by the fire.
Akira Tanaka (田中 昭, Tanaka Akira)
Voiced by: Keiko Kawakami (Japanese); Luci Christian (English)
He is Kaori's younger brother and he is in 7th grade. He is childish but very brave. When he sees one of the villagers who was supposed to be dead near the Kanemasa mansion, he and his sister start spying on the Kirishikis, which is when they meet Natsuno, who also believes that those who died are behind the murders in Sotoba. During the series, Akira went to inspect a house, discovering a sleeping shiki. When he is about to stake him, Tatsumi stops him. Akira later awakens, bound and gagged in front of the shiki he tried to kill. Natsuno saves him from the shiki and unites him with Kaori at the hospital. The Tanaka siblings watch as the fire destroys the village.
Tatsumi (辰巳, Tatsumi)
Voiced by: Wataru Takagi (Japanese); Ian Sinclair (English)
One of the main servants to the Kirishiki family. Tatsumi is a special kind of vampire called the "jinrou", who can withstand the sunlight unlike Shiki and cannot be easily killed. He is a sadistic individual and enjoys tormenting his victims. But he is also quite calm, hardly showing any signs of panic during a fight or even in the face of death. He also acts as the commander of the Shiki-turned villagers. Despite this, Tatsumi feels that he is above the Shiki, who he sees as people who failed to become Jinrō due to some unknown fault that the successful Jinrō lacked prior to their transformation. He has a great respect for Sunako, risking his life for her near the end of the series. He also respects Natsuno as an equal rival, being the only other Jinrō in the village. He is killed in Natsuno's suicide attack at the end of the series.

== Media ==
=== Novel ===
The novel Shiki was first published in 1998 by Shinchosha and consisted of 2 volumes. The second edition was published in tankōbon format in 2002 and consists of 5 volumes.

First edition:

- Vol. 1: ISBN 4-10-397002-2, September 1998
- Vol. 2: ISBN 4-10-397003-0, September 1998

Second edition:

- Vol. 1: ISBN 4-10-124023-X, January 30, 2002
- Vol. 2: ISBN 4-10-124024-8, January 30, 2002
- Vol. 3: ISBN 4-10-124025-6, February 28, 2002
- Vol. 4: ISBN 4-10-124026-4, February 28, 2002
- Vol. 5: ISBN 4-10-124027-2, February 28, 2002

=== Manga ===
Cover of the first manga volume

A manga adaptation of the novels, drawn by Ryu Fujisaki, was serialized in Shueisha's monthly shōnen manga magazine Jump Square from December 4, 2007, to June 3, 2011. Shueisha collected its chapters in eleven tankōbon volumes, released from July 4, 2008, to July 4, 2011.

==== Volumes ====
No.	Release date	ISBN
01	July 4, 2008	978-4-08-874549-7
00. "Prologue" (序章, "Joshō"); 01. "Natsuno Yūki Chapter: Part 1" (結城夏野編 第遺血話, "Yūki Natsuno Hen Dai Ichi Wa"); 02. "Natsuno Yūki Chapter: Part 2" (結城夏野編 第腐堕話, "Yūki Natsuno Hen Dai Futa (Ni) Wa")
02	July 4, 2008	978-4-08-874550-3
03. "Natsuno Yūki Chapter: Part 3" (結城夏野編 第惨話, "Yūki Natsuno Hen Dai San Wa"); 04. "Natsuno Yūki Chapter: Part 4" (結城夏野編 第死話, "Yūki Natsuno Hen Dai Shi (Yon) Wa"); 05. "Natsuno Yūki Chapter Side-Story: A Day of Masao Murasako" (結城夏野編 サイドストーリー 村迫正雄の一日, "Yūki Natsuno Hen Saido Sutōrī Murasako Masao no Ichinichi")
03	October 3, 2008	978-4-08-874585-5
06. "Toshio Ozaki Chapter: Part 1" (尾崎敏夫編 第遺血話, "Ozaki Toshio Hen Dai Ichi Wa"); 07. "Natsuno Yūki Chapter: Part 5" (結城夏野編 第偽話, "Yūki Natsuno Hen Dai Itsu (Go) Wa"); 08. "Natsuno Yūki Chapter: Part 6" (結城夏野編 第髏苦話, "Yūki Natsuno Hen Dai Roku Wa"); 09. "Toshio Ozaki Chapter: Part 2" (尾崎敏夫編 第腐堕話, "Ozaki Toshio Hen Dai Futa (Ni) Wa")
04	February 4, 2009	978-4-08-874645-6
10. "Toshio Ozaki Chapter: Part 3" (尾崎敏夫編 第惨話, "Ozaki Toshio Hen Dai San Wa"); 11. "Natsuno Yūki Chapter: Part 7" (結城夏野編 第弑魑話, "Yūki Natsuno Hen Dai Shichi Wa"); 12. "Natsuno Yūki Chapter Side-Story: A Night of Masao Murasako" (結城夏野編 サイドストーリー 村迫正雄の一夜, "Yūki Natsuno Hen Saido Sutōrī Murasako Masao no Ichiya"); 13. "Natsuno Yūki Chapter: Part 8" (結城夏野編 第夜話, "Yūki Natsuno Hen Dai Ya (Hachi) Wa")
05	July 3, 2009	978-4-08-874707-1
14. "Toshio Ozaki Chapter: Part 4" (尾崎敏夫編 第死話, "Ozaki Toshio Hen Dai Shi (Yon) Wa"); 15. "Toshio Ozaki Chapter: Part 5" (尾崎敏夫編 第偽話, "Ozaki Toshio Hen Dai Itsu (Go) Wa"); 16. "Natsuno Yūki Chapter: Part 9" (結城夏野編 第柩話, "Yūki Natsuno Hen Dai Kyū Wa"); 17. "Natsuno Yūki Chapter: Part 10" (結城夏野編 第悼話, "Yūki Natsuno Hen Dai Tō (Jū) Wa")
06	October 2, 2009	978-4-08-874744-6
18. "Natsuno Yūki Chapter: Part 11" (結城夏野編 第悼と悲屠話, "Yūki Natsuno Hen Dai Tō to Hito (Jūichi) Wa"); 19. "Toshio Ozaki Chapter: Part 6" (尾崎敏夫編 第髏苦話, "Ozaki Toshio Hen Dai Roku Wa"); 20. "Toshio Ozaki Chapter Special: A Doctor's Record" (尾崎敏夫編 特別版 ある医師による記録, "Ozaki Toshio Hen Tokubetsu Ban Aru Ishi ni Yoru Kiroku"); 21. "Natsuno Yūki Chapter: Part 12" (結城夏野編 第悼と腐堕話, "Yūki Natsuno Hen Dai Tō to Futa (Jūni) Wa")
07	February 4, 2010	978-4-08-870007-6
22. "Sunako Kirishiki Chapter: Part 1" (桐敷沙子編 第遺血話, "Kirishiki Sunako Hen Dai Ichi Wa"); 23. "Toshio Ozaki Chapter: Part 7" (尾崎敏夫編 第弑魑話, "Ozaki Toshio Hen Dai Shichi Wa"); 24. "Side Story: Shimo Sotoba Housewife Motoko Maeda's July 25-November 6" (サイドストーリー 下外場主婦 前田元子の7月25日-11月6日, "Saido Sutōrī Shimo Sotoba Shūfu Maeda Motoko no Shichigatsu Nijūgonichi-Jūichigatsu Muika"); 25. "Natsuno Yūki Chapter: Part 13" (結城夏野編 第悼と惨話, "Yūki Natsuno Hen Dai Tō to San (Jūsan) Wa")
08	July 2, 2010	978-4-08-870077-9
26. "Toshio Ozaki Chapter: Part 8" (尾崎敏夫編 第夜話, "Ozaki Toshio Hen Dai Ya (Hachi) Wa"); 27. "Toshio Ozaki Chapter: Part 9" (尾崎敏夫編 第柩話, "Ozaki Toshio Hen Dai Kyū Wa"); 28. "Natsuno Yūki Chapter: Part 14" (結城夏野編 第悼と死話, "Yūki Natsuno Hen Dai Tō to Shi (Jūyon) Wa"); 29. "Toshio Ozaki Chapter: Part 10" (尾崎敏夫編 第悼話, "Ozaki Toshio Hen Dai Tō (Jū) Wa")
09	October 4, 2010	978-4-08-870121-9
30. "Toshio Ozaki Chapter: Part 11" (尾崎敏夫編 第悼と悲屠話, "Ozaki Toshio Hen Dai Tō to Hito (Jūichi) Wa"); 31. "Toshio Ozaki Chapter: Part 12" (尾崎敏夫編 第悼と腐堕話, "Ozaki Toshio Hen Dai Tō to Futa (Jūni) Wa"); 32. "Toshio Ozaki Chapter: Part 13" (尾崎敏夫編 第悼と惨話, "Ozaki Toshio Hen Dai Tō to San (Jūsan) Wa"); 33. "Seishin Muroi Chapter: Part 1" (室井静信編 第遺血話, "Muroi Seishin Hen Dai Ichi Wa")
10	February 4, 2011	978-4-08-870199-8
34. "Side Story: Shimo Sotoba Housewife Motoko Maeda's November 6" (サイドストーリー 下外場主婦 前田元子の11月6日, "Saido Sutōrī Shimo Sotoba Shūfu Maeda Motoko no Jūichigatsu Muika"); 35. "Toshio Ozaki Chapter: Part 14" (尾崎敏夫編 第悼と死話, "Ozaki Toshio Hen Dai Tō to Shi (Jūyon) Wa"); 36. "Toshio Ozaki Chapter: Part 15" (尾崎敏夫編 第悼と偽話, "Ozaki Toshio Hen Dai Tō to Itsu Wa"); 37. "Toshio Ozaki Chapter: Part 16" (尾崎敏夫編 第悼と髏苦話, "Ozaki Toshio Hen Dai Tō to Roku Wa")
11	July 4, 2011	978-4-08-870267-4
38. "Seishin Muroi Chapter: Part 2: Decay and Degradation"; 39. "Natsuno Yūki Chapter: Part 15: Mourning and Lies"; 40. "Natsuno Yūki Chapter: Part 16: Mourning, Skulls and Anguish"; 41. "The last part"

=== Anime ===
An anime adaptation of the manga version of Shiki was first announced in Japan in December 2009, with the official website unveiled. Although Aniplex was listed as handling production for the anime, the website stated that the company will be in charge of distribution duties while Daume is responsible for the animation production. Japanese celebrity Gackt made his first regular cast debut on Shiki, as revealed during Noitamina's late-night timeslot lineup. Funimation simulcasted the series on their online video portal and released the series on DVD and Blu-ray on May 29, 2012. Funimation's rights to the series expired on June 30, 2018.

The 22 episodes aired from July 8 to December 30, 2010. Two bonus episodes were released in OVA format on DVD the following summer, bringing the episode total to 24. The OVAs are additions to episodes 20 and 21, that are numbered 20.5 and 21.5 and share the same episode titles, except with "and Offense" added to the end.

== See also ==
- 'Salem's Lot – 1975 novel by Stephen King, to which the Shiki novel is dedicated
