= Yūya Asato =

Japanese actor

- 安里 勇哉
- Born: December 4, 1987 (age 38); Okinawa Prefecture, Japan
- Occupations: Stage actor; Voice actor
- Years active: 2011–present
- Agent: Ruby Parade
- Height: 180 cm (5 ft 11 in)
- Website: www.ruby-parade.com/artist_08.html

Yūya Asato (安里 勇哉, Asato Yūya), also known as Anri (あんり), is a Japanese stage, film, TV, and voice actor, affiliated with Ruby Parade. He is also a member of the performance unit Tokyo Ryūsei-gun since 2012

== Biography ==
Yūya Asato was born on December 4, 1987, in Okinawa Prefecture, Japan. After graduating high school, he was enrolled into a preparatory school but decided to quit midway through his summer course to move to Tokyo. In January 2011, he joined Ruby Parade after being introduced to an event company president through an acquaintance. Since then, he has appeared in various 2.5D musical and stage play adaptations such as Kagami Taiga in Kuroko's Basketball and F6 Ichimatsu from Osomatsu-san on Stage: Six Men's Show Time. In 2017, he landed his first anime voice acting role as Kai von Granzreich in The Royal Tutor, which he also portrayed in the tie-in stage adaptations and theatrical movie.

== Filmography ==
=== Theater ===
Year	Title	Role
2011	Dear Boys	Naoya Tamaki
2011	in the blue	Shuen, Moriike
2011	Angel Eyes Massuguni Susume	Word
2012	Gomi Suitchi: Watashi to Sekai o Tsunaida Hitotsu no Baggu no Nonogatari	Seiji
2012	Schwatch!: Mezasu wa taitsu no ōji-sama	Seiji Ishida
2012	abc ★ Akasaka Boys Cabaret 3-kai-hyō!: Jibun ni katsu o irete katsu!	Mamoru Yona
2012	Base Beaux Hamlet!!	Hamlet
2013	Kaerizaki Living Dead	
2013	Sasurai 7	
2014	Naitetamaruka! ! Inochi no shirushi	
2014	Pride	
2015	High Risk HighSchool: Semi no mesu wa nakanai ze… natsu	Mamoru Takahashi
2015	Diabolik Lovers	Sakamaki Shuu
2015	Yowamushi Pedal Irregular: 2tsu no chōjō	Kanzaki Tōji
2016	Kamisama Kiss Kamisama Hajimemashita	
2016	4 Kyasuto futari shibai ~Reverse☆ Boy~	
2016	Kuroko no Basket Kuroko's Basketball: The Encounter	Kagami Taiga
2016	Gekijōban Meiji Tokyo Renka: Yumihari no Serenade	Charlie
2016	Namida-bashi Ding Dong Band	Taku Yūki
2016	Diabolik Lovers | Diabolik Lovers 〜re:requiem〜	Sakamaki Shuu
2016	Mr. Osomatsu | Osomatsu-san on Stage ~Six Men's Show Time~	Ichimatsu (F6)
2016	Hakkenden: Eight Dogs of the East | Hakkenden: Tōhō Hakken Ibun	Keno Inusaka
2017	Otome Yōkai Zakuro	Omodaka/Takatoshi Hanadate
2017	Messiah ~Aki no Koku~	Dr. TEN
2017	Bokura ga hijō no Taiga o Kudaru toki -Shinjuku bara sensō-	Ani
2017	Kuroko's Basketball: OVER-DRIVE	Kagami Taiga
2017	The Royal Tutor	Kai von Granzreich
2017	Namida-bashi Ding Dong Band 2: Kizu-darake no Yūhi	Taku Yūki
2018	Mr. Osomatsu | Osomatsu-san on Stage ~Six Men's Show Time 2~	Ichimatsu (F6)
2018	Kuroko's Basketball: IGNITE-ZONE	Kagami Taiga
2018	Hebi no Ashu	Mamushi
2018	Nobunaga no Yabo	Tanaka Masaki
2018	Kageki Meiji Tokyo Renka ~ Tsukiniji no Fiancée	Charlie (voice-only)
2018	F6 First Live Tour - SATISFACTION	Ichimatsu (F6)
2018	Uta no Prince-sama : Gekidan Shining ~ Polaris	Hiro Sunnyline
2018	Jitsu wa Subarashii Kazouku toiu koto wo Shitte Hoshi (Beautiful Family)	Kaneko Kotaro
2019	Musical 『Houshin Engi ~ Mezame no Toki~』	Youzen
2019	Namida-bashi Ding Dong Band 3	Taku Yuki
2019	The Royal Tutor - The Musical II -	Kai von Granzreich
2019	Kuroko's Basketball: ULTIMATE-BLAZE	Kagami Taiga
2019	Oheya no Ohanashi	Shinjou
2019	Ginga: Nagareboshi Gin ~ Kizuna-hen~	John
2019	Three Rage	Maezaki Kyosuke
2019	THE BAMBI SHOW 3RD STAGE	Various
2019	Mr. Osomatsu | Osomatsu-san on Stage ~Six Men's Show Time 3~	Ichimatsu (F6)
2020	Mr. Osomatsu | F6 2nd Live Tour - FANTASTIC ECSTASY	Ichimatsu (F6)
2020	Three Rage 1.5 - bond of the screen- (online broadcast)	Maezaki Kyosuke
2020	Fire Force Stage	Foien Li
2020	Musical 『Houshin Engi ~ Prelude of the War ~』	Youzen
2020	CLUMSY LIES ~ぶきような嘘~	Tsushima
2021	『Toilet-Bound Hanako-kun ~ The Musical~』	Tsuchigomori
2021	VIVID CONTACT ~re:born~	Hotel Clerk Asato
2021	Galileo★CV	Komai Ryosuke
2021	The Rising of the Shield Hero Stage	Motoyasu Kitamura (Spear Hero)
2021	Paradox Live Stage	Yohei Kanbayashi
2021	あれから	Aimi Dai
2021	『The Man Who Killed Nobunaga: The Truth of Honnouji Incident Found After 431 Years』 Reading Play	Oda Nobunaga
2022	『The Mysterious Thief Detective 'YAMANEKO' the Stage』	Ukai/Orca
2022	Fruits Basket The Stage	Shigure Sohma
2022	Paradox Live on Stage THE LIVE～BAE×The Cat's Whiskers～	Yohei Kanbayashi
2022	Theatrical Group Z-Lion「Theme・Wa ga Ya no Kazoku」	Yasue Shoutaro
2022	Stage Play「My Next Life as a Villainess: All Routes Lead to Doom! 」	Alan Stuart
2022	Stage Play「Bungo to Alchemist - Rondo of Lamenter」	Kume Masao
2022	Stage Play「Kyokutan na Hitotachi」	Sato Seiki
2022	Stage Play「Boku dake ga Seijou na Sekai 」	Night(夜)
2022	Stage Fes 2022-2023「Paradox Live on Stage 」	Yohei Kanbayashi

=== Films ===
Year	Title	Role
2011	Vampire Stories	
2013	Hikinzoku no Yoru	
2014	Hot Road	
2017	Messiah Gaiden: Polar night	Dr. Ten
2017	Gifted: Furimun to chichi uri onna	
2018	BLOOD-CLUB DOLLS I	Akikawa
2018	Momijibashi	Masaya Kitajima
2019	The Royal Tutor - The Movie	Kai von Granzreich
2020	Monster Seafood Wars	Shinjirou Hikoma
2020	Shuukatsu 4: Jinrou Mensetsu	
2020	BLOOD-CLUB DOLLS II	Dr. Ten

=== TV series ===
Year	Title	Role
2017	Yowamushi Pedal	Kanzaki Tōji
2017	secret~ Kioku no Mori~ (web drama)	Daisho Sakaki
2019	BAKUHOU the FRIDAY	Kanechika Daiki (EXIT)
2019	TBS Wada Masanari & Asato Yuya's Otokobae Series (NINJA Showdown)	As himself
2020	BS Fuji「CODE1515」	Akatsuki Yuuki
2020	Shuku Shuku To (web drama)	Hisaishi Miki
2020	TBS Wada Masanari & Asato Yuya's Otokobae Series (MATAGI Showdown)	As himself
2020	TBS Wada Masanari & Asato Yuya's Otokobae Series (KATANAKAJI Showdown)	As himself
2021	BS TV Tokyo ~ Zokkuto-suru Kaikanbanashi Online Recitation Event	As himself
2021	TV Kanagawa ~ Sareru Bokura	Various
2021	Meitantei wa Kimi Da (Episode 1)	Tsuyoshi Wada
2021	TBS Wada Masanari & Asato Yuya's Otokobae Series (KITAKANTO Showdown)	As himself

=== Anime ===
Year	Title	Role
2017	The Royal Tutor	Kai von Granzreich
2018	Magical Girl Site	Naoto Keisuke, Ichi

=== Game ===
Year	Title	Role
2018	Ikemen Revolution	Dum/Dalim

== Discography ==
=== CD ===
Release date	Album	Tracks
10 February 2017	Osomatsu-san on STAGE ～SIX MEN'S SONG TIME～	WAKE UP! SIX MEN'S SHOW TIME!!!!!!
10 February 2017	Osomatsu-san on STAGE ～SIX MEN'S SONG TIME～	六つ無情の数え歌
10 February 2017	Osomatsu-san on STAGE ～SIX MEN'S SONG TIME～	聖なるかな匣智裡紙
10 February 2017	Osomatsu-san on STAGE ～SIX MEN'S SONG TIME～	Forever 6ock You
10 February 2017	Osomatsu-san on STAGE ～SIX MEN'S SONG TIME～	SIX FAME FACES ～舞台も最高!!!!!!ffffff!!!!
21 June 2017	The Royal Tutor : Prince Night〜どこにいたのさ!? MY PRINCESS〜	Prince Night〜どこにいたのさ!? MY PRINCESS〜
21 June 2017	The Royal Tutor : Prince Night〜どこにいたのさ!? MY PRINCESS〜	Willkommen〜美しきこの王国で〜
27 September 2017	TV Anime「The Royal Tutor」Kai Character Song Album	いざ いざ いざ 行かん！
27 September 2017	TV Anime「The Royal Tutor」Kai Character Song Album	「Prince Night〜どこにいたのさ!? MY PRINCESS〜」Kai ver.
21 December 2018	Osomatsu-san: F6 1st ALBUM「Satisfaction」	Magic Night Satisfaction
21 December 2018	Osomatsu-san: F6 1st ALBUM「Satisfaction」	ビューティームーン・ミステリアス
21 December 2018	Osomatsu-san: F6 1st ALBUM「Satisfaction」	ALL We MEET With LOVE
21 December 2018	Osomatsu-san: F6 1st ALBUM「Satisfaction」	NO DARLING NO WIFE
11 September 2019	Stage Play 「Ginga - Nagareboshi Gin - 」~Kizuna-hen~	Tatakai no Monogatari
11 September 2019	Stage Play 「Ginga - Nagareboshi Gin - 」~Kizuna-hen~	Nagareboshi Gin
11 September 2019	Stage Play 「Ginga - Nagareboshi Gin - 」~Kizuna-hen~	GSD
11 September 2019	Stage Play 「Ginga - Nagareboshi Gin - 」~Kizuna-hen~	Chigasawagu
11 September 2019	Stage Play 「Ginga - Nagareboshi Gin - 」~Kizuna-hen~	Mangetsu ~ Tabidachi no Toki ~ acoustic ver.
11 September 2019	Stage Play 「Ginga - Nagareboshi Gin - 」~Kizuna-hen~	Last Song ~ Kataritsugu Monogatari ~
10 July 2020	Osomatsu-san: F6 2nd ALBUM「FANTASTIC ECSTASY」	FantaStIc X-tasy
10 July 2020	Osomatsu-san: F6 2nd ALBUM「FANTASTIC ECSTASY」	NAKED KINGDOM
10 July 2020	Osomatsu-san: F6 2nd ALBUM「FANTASTIC ECSTASY」	マツゥ～ ダンシング・マハラジャ・ナイト～
10 July 2020	Osomatsu-san: F6 2nd ALBUM「FANTASTIC ECSTASY」	CASHLESS!!!!!!
