= She Professed Herself Pupil of the Wise Man =

Japanese light novel series

- First light novel volume cover

賢者の弟子を名乗る賢者 (Kenja no Deshi o Nanoru Kenja)
- Genre: Fantasy, isekai
- Novel series
- Written by: Hirotsugu Ryusen
- Published by: Shōsetsuka ni Narō
- Original run: April 4, 2012 – present
- Light novel
- Written by: Hirotsugu Ryusen
- Illustrated by: Fuzichoco
- Published by: Micro Magazine
- English publisher: NA: Seven Seas Entertainment
- Imprint: GC Novels
- Original run: June 30, 2014 – present
- Volumes: 23
- Manga
- Written by: Hirotsugu Ryusen
- Illustrated by: Dicca Suemitsu
- Published by: Micro Magazine
- English publisher: NA: Seven Seas Entertainment
- Magazine: Comic Ride
- Original run: July 28, 2016 – present
- Volumes: 16
- Manga

Kenja no Deshi o Nanoru Kenja: Mira to Sutekina Shōkan Seirei-tachi
- Written by: Hirotsugu Ryusen
- Illustrated by: Yu Uonuma
- Published by: DeNA
- Magazine: Manga Box
- Original run: October 22, 2020 – present
- Volumes: 3
- Manga

Kenja no Deshi o Nanoru Kenja: Mariana no Touki Hi
- Written by: Hirotsugu Ryusen
- Illustrated by: Vanilla Boww
- Published by: Micro Magazine
- Magazine: Comic Ride
- Original run: February 1, 2021 – present
- Volumes: 2
- Anime television series
- Directed by: Keitaro Motonaga
- Written by: Takamitsu Kōno
- Music by: Go Sakabe
- Studio: Studio A-Cat
- Licensed by: Crunchyroll (streaming); SA/SEA: Muse Communication
- Original network: Tokyo MX, MBS, BS NTV, AT-X
- Original run: January 12, 2022 – March 30, 2022
- Episodes: 12

She Professed Herself Pupil of the Wise Man (Japanese: 賢者の弟子を名乗る賢者, Hepburn: Kenja no Deshi o Nanoru Kenja) is a Japanese light novel series written by Hirotsugu Ryusen and illustrated by Fuzichoco. It began serialization as a web novel published on the user-generated novel publishing website Shōsetsuka ni Narō in April 2012. Micro Magazine later acquired the series, which began releasing it in print in June 2014 under their GC Novels imprint. Twenty-three volumes have been published as of December 2025. A manga adaptation by Dicca Suemitsu began serialization online via Micro Magazine's Comic Ride website in July 2016, which has been compiled into sixteen tankōbon volumes as of October 2026. Both the light novel and manga have been licensed in North America by Seven Seas Entertainment. An anime television series adaptation by Studio A-Cat aired from January to March 2022.

== Synopsis ==
The series follows Sakimori Kagami, who has been playing the online video game Ark Earth Online for a long time as the character Danblf, an old male sorcerer who is one of the game's nine great sages. One day after adjusting his character, he is sucked into the game world, and finds himself inhabiting his character's body, who after his adjustments looks like a young woman; he tries to convince the people of the game world that he is Danblf's pupil while figuring out on how to turn himself back to normal and escape the game world.

== Characters ==
=== Nine Wise Men ===
The Nine Wise Men are the most powerful sorcerers serving the Arkite Kingdom. They are devoted to the absolute mastery of each specialty of the nine branches of Magic.

Mira (ミラ, Mira) / Danblf Gandagore (ダンブルフ・ガンダロール, Danburufu Gandarōru) / Sakimori Kagami (咲森 鑑, Kagami Sakimori)
Voiced by: Nichika Ōmori (Mira), Isao Sasaki (Dunblf) (Japanese); Felecia Angelle (Mira), Mick Wingert (Danblf) (English)
A 27-year-old male Japanese VRMMO player who, after using a strange cash item called Vanity Case from the game, finds himself translocated into the setting of his role-plays, Ark Earth Online, and transformed not into his favorite character, the powerful magician Danblf Gandagore (ダンブルフ・ガンダロール; an obvious mingling of the names Gandalf and Dumbledore), but a cute, petite girl with silver hair and blue eyes, though he retains Danblf's sorcerous abilities. In order to explain her abilities, she passes herself off as a pupil of Danblf, who is considered an honored hero. As her new identity, she adopts the name Mira (after the English translation of her own name "Kagami", which means "mirror"). She later reveals her real identity to her companions.

Luminaria (ルミナリア, Ruminaria)
Voiced by: Minami Hinata (Japanese); Michelle Rojas (English)
A Wiseman - or rather, Wisewoman - of the Tower of Elementary Magic, she is a surprisingly young and beautiful red-haired woman with a happy-to-go personality. Luminaria is actually another male Ark Earth roleplayer who found himself displaced into the game's world in female form, although the anime makes no mention of this.

Soul Howl (ソウルハウル, Sōru Hauru)
Voiced by: Daisuke Hirakawa (Japanese); Daman Mills (English)
A Wiseman of the Tower of Necromancy Magic

Meilin (メイリン, Meirin)
Voiced by: Ari Ozawa (Japanese); Emi Lo (English)
A Wisewoman of the Tower of Daoism Magic

Lastrada (ラストラーダ, Rasutorāda)
A Wiseman of the Tower of Exorcism Magic

Kagura (カグラ, Kagura)
A Wisewoman of the Tower of Onmyoujitsu Magic

Artesia (アルテシア, Aruteshia)
A Wisewoman of the Tower of Holy Magic

Valentin (ヴァレンティン, Varenchinn)
A Wiseman of the Tower of Assimilation Magic

Frone (フローヌ, Furōnu)
A Wiseman - or rather, Wisewoman - of the Tower of Abstract Magic

=== Arkite Kingdom ===
Solomon (ソロモン, Soromon)
Voiced by: Ayumu Murase (Japanese); Brandon McInnis (English)
A Holy Knight and King of the Arkite Kingdom. He had the feeling that Mira is in fact Danblf since their first meeting. He also has an interest in militaries.

Mariana (マリアナ)
Voiced by: Yui Horie (Japanese); Xanthe Huynh (English)
Danblf's personal fairy assistant. She becomes very fond of Mira.

Cleos (クレオス, Kureosu)
Voiced by: Shouta Aoi (Japanese); Jacob Browning (English)

Amalette (アマラッテ)
Voiced by: Ayane Sakura (Japanese); Kristen McGuire (English)

=== Adventurers ===
Emera (エメラ)
Voiced by: Yūko Natsuyoshi (Japanese); Dani Chambers (English)
An elf swordsman and one of Cyril's companions.

Frikka (フリッカ, Furikka)
Voiced by: Yae Sakura (Japanese); Brittany Lauda (English)
A sorceress who likes cute things and makes perverted advancements towards Mira.

Asbal (アスバル, Asubaru)
Voiced by: Hiroki Yasumoto (Japanese); Jeremy Inman (English)

Zef (ゼフ, Zefu)
Voiced by: Junichi Saitō (Japanese); Ricco Fajardo (English)

Tact (タクト, Takuto)
Voiced by: Kanomi Izawa (Japanese); Apphia Yu (English)

Cyril (セロ)
Voiced by: Yoshiki Nakajima (Japanese); Ryan Colt Levy (English)

== Media ==
=== Light novels ===
No.	Original release date	Original ISBN	English release date	English ISBN
1	June 30, 2014	978-4-04-066719-5	September 28, 2021	978-1-64827-423-7
2	November 29, 2014	978-4-04-066924-3	November 16, 2021	978-1-64827-441-1
3	May 30, 2015	978-4-04-067133-8	February 22, 2022	978-1-64827-449-7
4	November 30, 2015	978-4-04-067356-1	June 28, 2022	978-1-64827-470-1
5	April 28, 2016	978-4-04-067696-8	December 20, 2022	978-1-63858-137-6
6	October 28, 2016	978-4-04-067785-9	April 11, 2023	978-1-63858-300-4
7	March 31, 2017	978-4-04-068020-0	May 30, 2023	978-1-63858-820-7
8	October 31, 2017	978-4-04-068183-2	July 25, 2023	978-1-63858-962-4
9	April 28, 2018	978-4-04-068461-1	January 30, 2024	978-1-68579-637-2
10	November 30, 2018	978-4-04-069087-2	April 9, 2024	978-1-68579-662-4
11	May 30, 2019	978-4-04-069274-6	September 10, 2024	979-8-88843-481-9
12	November 30, 2019	978-4-04-069599-0	January 21, 2025	979-8-88843-666-0
13	May 29, 2020	978-4-04-069868-7	May 20, 2025	979-8-89160-070-6
14	November 30, 2020	978-4-04-069868-7	September 23, 2025	979-8-89160-071-3
15	May 31, 2021	978-4-86-716147-0	January 13, 2026	979-8-89373-015-9
16	December 28, 2021	978-4-86-716227-9	May 19, 2026	979-8-89160-579-4
17	April 30, 2022	978-4-86-716282-8	September 8, 2026	979-8-89561-401-3
18	January 30, 2023	978-4-86-716387-0	—	—
19	August 30, 2023	978-4-86-716463-1	—	—
20	February 29, 2024	978-4-86-716538-6	—	—
21	September 30, 2024	978-4-86-716636-9	—	—
22	April 30, 2025	978-4-86-716752-6; 978-4-86-716753-3 (SE)	—	—
23	December 26, 2025	978-4-86-716890-5	—	—
24	October 30, 2026	978-4-82-500061-2	—	—

=== Manga ===
No.	Original release date	Original ISBN	English release date	English ISBN
1	March 31, 2017	978-4-04-067796-5	July 20, 2021	978-1-64827-429-9
2	October 31, 2017	978-4-04-068150-4	September 28, 2021	978-1-64827-442-8
3	April 28, 2018	978-4-04-068664-6	December 14, 2021	978-1-64827-461-9
4	November 30, 2018	978-4-04-069257-9	February 15, 2022	978-1-63858-115-4
5	June 29, 2019	978-4-04-069696-6	July 26, 2022	978-1-63858-236-6
6	January 30, 2020	978-4-04-065197-2	September 20, 2022	978-1-63858-389-9
7	October 30, 2020	978-4-04-065197-2	December 27, 2022	978-1-63858-695-1
8	May 28, 2021	978-4-86-716142-5	March 14, 2023	978-1-63858-875-7
9	January 31, 2022	978-4-86-716236-1	July 18, 2023	978-1-68579-475-0
10	October 31, 2022	978-4-86-716350-4	December 26, 2023	979-8-88843-081-1
11	July 28, 2023	978-4-86-716448-8	May 28, 2024	979-8-88843-773-5
12	March 28, 2024	978-4-86-716549-2	December 31, 2024	979-8-89160-655-5
13	December 25, 2024	978-4-86-716685-7	October 14, 2025	979-8-89373-322-8
14	July 31, 2025	978-4-86-716807-3	May 12, 2026	979-8-89765-360-7
15	February 27, 2026	978-4-86-716917-9	March 23, 2027	979-8-90209-024-3
16	October 29, 2026	978-4-82-500056-8	—	—

==== Spin-offs ====
===== Mira to Sutekina Shōkan Seirei-tachi =====
No.	Japanese release date	Japanese ISBN
1	May 28, 2021	978-4-86-716145-6
2	January 31, 2022	978-4-86-716237-8
3	February 28, 2022	978-4-86-716254-5

===== Mariana no Touki Hi =====
No.	Japanese release date	Japanese ISBN
1	January 31, 2022	978-4-86-716238-5
2	May 31, 2022	978-4-86-716295-8

=== Anime ===
An anime television series adaptation was announced on May 27, 2020. The series is animated by Studio A-Cat and directed by Keitaro Motonaga, with Takamitsu Kōno overseeing the series' scripts, Kumi Horii designing the characters, and Go Sakabe composing the series' music. It was initially scheduled to premiere in 2021, but it was later delayed. It aired from January 12 to March 30, 2022, on Tokyo MX and other networks. (Note: Tokyo MX lists the series premiere at 24:30 on January 11, 2022, which is effectively 12:30 a.m. JST on January 12.) Funimation co-produced and streamed the series. The opening theme song is "Ready Set Go!!" by Asaka, while the ending theme song is "Ambitious" by Erabareshi. Muse Communication licensed the anime in South and Southeast Asia, and the series is available to watch on iQiyi.

==== Episode list ====
No.	Title	Directed by	Written by	Storyboarded by	Original release date
1	"I am Cute..."; Transliteration: "Washi, kawaī......" (Japanese: わし、かわいい……)	Keitarō Motonaga	Takamitsu Kōno	Keitarō Motonaga, Gōichi Iwahata	January 12, 2022
Within the VRMMORPG game of Ark Earth Online there are no limits on what is possible, there are also no rules or instructions and player progression is based solely on effort, intelligence and experimentation. 27 year old Sakimora Kagami has spent years progressing relentlessly and his character, Dunblf Gangadore, is now one of the nine Wise Men, the most powerful sorcerers of Arkite Kingdom. One day his close friend, King Solomon of Arkite, whom he helped create Arkite Kingdom with years before, sends him on a mission to destroy an army of 10,000 monsters. Due to their numbers they suspect the army was summoned by sorcerers of another kingdom. With his power to summon his own massive army including a dragon, Dunblf destroys the monsters and returns victorious. Several days later the entire in game universe is shocked to discover Dunblf has disappeared never to be seen again, leaving Arkite in complete turmoil. A young girl with silver hair and blue eyes awakens in the wilderness and makes her way to Arkite and, upon seeing her reflection, is shocked to find she is cute.
2	"I Lied..."; Transliteration: "Washi, uso tsuita......" (Japanese: わし、ウソついた……)	Keitarō Motonaga	Takamitsu Kōno	Gōichi Iwahata	January 19, 2022
The girl turns out to be Dunblf and explains to Solomon he had been experimenting with changing his appearance with a Vanity Case, but fell asleep before deleting the changes, so now he is a young girl until he can obtain another Case. Solomon reveals the game underwent a massive reality update. Dunblf has somehow been gone for 30 years, and the only other Wise Man remaining is Luminaria who reappeared 20 years ago. Solomon has protected Arkite through many wars and even through an Industrial Era and now has technology including motorized vehicles. Returning to his home Dunblf meets his assistant Mariane, a fairy NPC, and finds the reality update has given all NPC's real personalities. As such Dunblf is forced to claim he is Mira, Dunblf's pupil, sent to replace Dunblf who is staying in a foreign country. Mira meets Solomon’s advisors and military leaders and to prove she is a suitable replacement for Dunblf destroy a small monster army. The advisors suspect the monsters are being controlled by Demon’s for an unknown purpose, that plus unrest with other kingdoms worries Solomon, yet with Dunblf's return finds he is finally having fun again.
3	"I'm... a Big Softie When It Comes to These Things"; Transliteration: "Washi...... kō iu no ni yowain ja yo nā" (Japanese: わし……こういうのに弱いんじゃよなぁ)	Kaoru Yabana	Chabō Higurashi	Miyana Okita	January 26, 2022
Solomon reveals 20 years after Dunblf disappeared a war broke out between humans and Demons. After the humans triumphed they signed a pact to ban war for 10 years, but this comes to an end in 1 year. Arkite needs the Nine Wise Men again, but the other seven are still missing despite Solomon's friend list proving they are all inside the game. Thus he orders Mira to find them before the pact expires. Mira suggests looking in Nebrapolis catacombs for Soul Howl the necromancer. Mira meets a young boy named Tact who wants to go to Nebrapolis to see his parents in a mirror that contacts the dead. Several NPC adventurers also volunteer, Emella, Zef, Asval and Flicker. Within Nebrapolis Zef sees his dead sister in the mirror, Lyrica, who died of illness and assures him her death was not his fault. Mira realizes she must reconsider her thoughts on NPC's who are much more human than she is used to. Tact cannot see his parents, suggesting they might not be dead. On Solomon’s request Mira tries to contact Howard, a dead NPC expert on demons to ask about their recent activities concerning the monsters.
4	"I'm at My Limit!"; Transliteration: "Washi, mō genkai!" (Japanese: わし、もう限界！)	Keitarō Motonaga	Kōjirō Nakamura	Gōichi Iwahata	February 2, 2022
Howard does not appear in the mirror, but as Howard was a known demon expert Emella reveals demons have been sighted in several other kingdoms, not just Arkite. Mira leads everyone to the catacombs sixth floor to a large castle which only she knows how to enter, asking everyone else to wait outside. Reaching Soul Howl's throne room it is revealed Howl is a hopeless pervert obsessed with death as Mira discovers hundreds of lifeless maids and a girl who is still slightly alive. Finding Howl’s laboratory Mira realizes Howl froze the girl in time so he could locate the Holy Grail of Heavenly Light to save her life. A demon suddenly attacks which Mira fights alone. For a second the adventurers think Mira resembles Dunblf but rejects this is silly. With a mixture of magic and her Immortal Arts fighting style, Mira defeats the demon, revealing to the adventurers she is Dunblf's pupil, which they easily believe. Mira realizes they can no longer qualify as just NPC's as they have childhood memories and even have parents. To this end she decides she must keep the kingdom safe for everyone living in it. Returning to the surface they find an army of monsters attacking the city.
5	"I'm Reborn!"; Transliteration: "Washi, sai tan!" (Japanese: わし、再・誕！)	Keitarō Motonaga	Tōko Machida	Gōichi Iwahata	February 9, 2022
Mira summons her Valkyrie warriors to defeat the monsters. Tact decides to become a Summoner like Mira. The adventurer’s boss, Captain Cyril, thanks Mira for her help. Mira divides up all the looted treasure and is surprised Cyril is able to lift the heavy weapon of the demon from the catacombs. Mira sends Tact to the guild to see if he has summoning potential then retrieves a clue sent by Solomon for some of the other Wise Men. Tact has Sorcerer, Priest and Diviner potential but no Summoner potential. Mira determines Cyril is also a player, not an NPC, and he comes close to guessing Mira is Dunblf, so Mira claims she and Dunblf were friends in real life. Cyril explains when he woke in the game he tried to find a way home. Along the way he befriended NPC's, eradicated goblins harassing their village and made improvements to their farming and taught them self-defense before re-joining his friends. He asks Mira to join the guild but she declines due to the importance of her mission, so instead he offers to look into Solomon's latest clue. Mira returns home, wearing her Dunblf robes, only to learn from Mariana replicas of the robe are popular as costumes with children, causing Mira to furiously realize she looks like a child playing dress up.
6	"I'm a Dress-Up Doll!"; Transliteration: "Washi, kisekae!" (Japanese: わし、着せ替えっ！)	Kaoru Yabana	Tōko Machida	Miyana Okita	February 16, 2022
Mira recalls that while returning home she came across a cat Shikigami named Nyanmaru. A Wind Spirit appears and explains they were attacked by humans, but she has no idea where Nyanmaru's master is. Handing over Soul Howl's research to Solomon’s chief researcher, Sulliman, Mira relates everything that happened. She is concerned about attacks on spirits and Nyanmaru, whose name suggests he belonged to Wiseman Kagura, a user of divining magic. Solomon is aware of a group, Chimera Clausen, who capture spirits. Sulliman learns from Soul Howl’s paperwork that the Holy Grail of Heavenly Light is actually a craftable item requiring rare ingredients, so he sends Mira to research them in the Fools Wunderkammer, a labyrinth full of books and materials. To enter the correct floor requires ore from a certain mine, so Garret and his team borrow one of Mira’s Dark Knights as a guard while they collect ore. While mining they are attacked by a legendary monster that defeats the knight. They are abruptly rescued by a young girl who defeats the bear using similar moves to Mira's Immortal Arts, but leaves without revealing her name. Based on her description Mira suspects she was Wiseman Meilin, an airhead obsessed with martial arts. With the ore Mira sets off for the labyrinth.
7	"I am the Strongest!"; Transliteration: "Washi, saikyō!" (Japanese: わし、最強！)	Keitarō Motonaga	Kōjirō Nakamura	Yūichi Abe	February 23, 2022
Mira enters Arkite Academy built over the labyrinths entrance and is mistaken for a prospective student by Hinata, a teacher of summoning magic like Mira, but the subject is so unpopular she has no students. Outraged, Mira agrees to represent the summoning skills department at the Mage Arts Symposium where performing well can earn prizes such as increases in funding and potentially attract students wishing to learn. Hinata has come in last place every year and is frequently mocked by Keris Burling of the sorcery department. After watching all the other departments Mira summons Leticia, a winged spirit who uses song magic for both healing and attack. Keris challenges her to a duel, refusing to believe a “little girl” could be so powerful, but he loses instantly when Mira summons a literal army of dark knights. The summoning department is declared victor. Master Cleos, the current master of summoning magic, meets Mira privately for a summoning duel and loses, which he takes as confirmation Mira is the returned Dunblf. He agrees to keep this a secret and gets the headmaster’s permission to enter the labyrinth, even bringing Hinata with them so she can watch how expert summoners fight in combat.
8	"I am Dunblf"; Transliteration: "Washi, Danburufu" (Japanese: わし、ダンブルフ)	Norihiko Nagahama	Chabō Higurashi	Shin'ichi Tōkairin, Gōichi Iwahata	March 2, 2022
Hinata summons some of her own creatures to fight the labyrinth’s monster guards so she can get advice from Mira and Cleos on improving them. Using the ore they enter the right level but to reach the right bookshelf they must get past a door with a spirit inscription they must decipher. As spirit language is indecipherable Mira summons Pam, a childlike rainbow spirit with all knowledge from history. With the puzzle solved they find the books they need and begin making copies. Unfortunately, while looking for a fun story Pam removes a book from its shelf, triggering security golems and forcing them to flee, luckily with all the information Mira needed. Now that Cleos knows Mira's secret, and since her next mission might last weeks, Solomon suggests she tell the truth to the important people in her life. She summons her most powerful creature, the dragon Eisenfald, who considered Dunblf his father but happily accepts Mira as his mother. Next she returns home and, after some procrastination, guiltily tells her maid Mariana that she is not Dunblf's pupil, but Dunblf himself. Mariana is overjoyed as she had missed Dunblf terribly and decides she and Mira will become closer than she ever was with Dunblf, including sleeping in Mira’s bed and sharing baths together.
9	"I Do Not Dislike This Sort of Turn of Events"; Transliteration: "Washi, kō iu tenkai kirai de wa nai nō" (Japanese: わし、こういう展開嫌いではないのぅ)	Makoto Sokuza	Chabō Higurashi	Gōichi Iwahata	March 9, 2022
Solomon sends Mira to Child of Prayer Forest where a tree root ingredient for the Grail is located, hoping for evidence of Soul Howl. Additionally he asks Mira to visit the nearby Primal Forest for useful ingredients. Mira stops at an old fort and notices a builder, Tomoki, who can move at extraordinary speeds. The soldier Ratri reveals they are constantly under attack from a giant monster that has caused mass casualties. One patient, Melissa, Mira diagnoses as poisoned by a toxin not found on this continent. Mira cures Melissa. The soldiers are so impressed they volunteer to help Mira hunt the monster. Mira lures the monster, a Tyrant Spikeback Gorilla, into a trap. With Mira's help the soldiers kill the Spikeback. Mira’s summoning magic is hailed as incredible. Mira learns Tomoki is also a Player, though his skills are crafting, not combat based. Tomoki believes the monsters could only have left their habitats with human assistance. Mira reaches the necessary tree where Tree Gods confirm Soul Howl collected the root, but they cannot say if it was recently or long ago. Mira offers sweets as payment but, due to the different nutritional preferences of plant based beings, is horrified when they ask if she will urinate on their roots instead.
10	"I'm Naked!"; Transliteration: "Washi, zenra!" (Japanese: わしっ、全裸っ！)	Norihiko Nagahama	Tōko Machida	Miyana Okita	March 16, 2022
At Primal Forest Mira seeks Progenitor Seeds in a cave and spends hours finding the ten seeds she requires. She also locates a treasure chest containing a wood fragment from the World Tree she decides to take for Luminaria. As the cave exit is down a river Mira strips naked so as not to dirty her clothing and rides the river outside. She is approached by a man who mistook her for a spirit due to her emerging from the water nude, but leaves after realizing she is a human. Following him Mira witnesses the man attempt to attack another spirit, only for him to be stopped by another man, a user of divining magic from the Isuzu League who confirms the unnamed attacker is from Chimera Clausen. Mira steps in to save the diviner and defeats the attacker, capturing him. The diviner, Blue, and his partner, White, thank her and take custody of the attacker. Putting together several clues, such as the attack on spirits, Nyanmaru's reappearance and Blue's fighting style Mira suspects the Isuzu League might be connected to missing Wiseman Elder of Divination Kagura and decides to accompany Blue to their headquarters, hoping to find a clue to Kagura's whereabouts.
11	"Did... None of the Praise Come My Way?"; Transliteration: "Washi...... homerarete naku nai ka?" (Japanese: わし……褒められてなくないか？)	Keitarō Motonaga	Takamitsu Kōno	Hiroyuki Furukawa, Gōichi Iwahata, Kentarō Tokiwa	March 23, 2022
Deciding to visit the Isuzu later Mira leaves and encounters Asval and his team providing security for a merchant caravan. They pass on news of the Black Hero who ten years previously defeated a demon army before vanishing. Mira recognizes this as Wiseman Valentin, a socially awkward demon expert. The caravan is attacked by monsters and a piece of cargo, a large stone, is stolen. The monsters are led by the legendary beasts, Silver and Gold Lions, which Mira and Asval defeat. The stone turns out to be a Demon's tablet. When Mira touches it she is transported away and meets a group of men in white whose leader explain her soul fell into a time fracture bringing her to the past. As Mira is about to return to the present the leader reveals his people are called Devils and are on their way to the Resurrection Gate where they hope to reincarnate as Angels. Mira is worried about a second gate nearby but returns to the present after the leader is sure they are destined to meet a second time in her future. In the present Mira has no memory of what just occurred. Returning home Mira finds the city being attacked by a massive demon army with Garret trying to organize a defense. She decides to deal with the army before finding Solomon.
12	"I Have Arrived!"; Transliteration: "Washi, sanjō!" (Japanese: わし、参上！)	Keitarō Motonaga	Takamitsu Kōno	Gōichi Iwahata	March 30, 2022
Despite the overwhelming numbers of monsters in three separate locations they are defeated by Luminaria, Cleos, Amalette and Mira. Before they can celebrate a crack opens in the sky and an immense black dragon appears through it and attempts to kill Solomon. Mira summons all seven of her Valkyries, tens of thousands of dark knights and Leticia to support them with healing magic. With the dragon distracted by her army Mira manages to paralyze the dragon while Luminaria hits it with an immensely powerful meteor strike. Somehow the dragon survives but Luminaria is left exhausted. The dragon attacks so to survive Mira summons Pam who casts every reinforcement spell she knows on Solomon, allowing him to resist the dragon and save everyone. Mira summons Eisenfald and the dragon is finally defeated. The kingdom celebrates but Mira refuses the official reward for killing the dragon, believing her identity should not be revealed to the public too soon and instead focus on her other goals of locating the Wisemen, dealing with Chimera Clausen and the approaching end to the inter kingdom peace agreement. With so many clues to follow up on Mira does not stay long and immediately sets out to continue her adventures.

== See also ==
- The 8th Son? Are You Kidding Me?, another light novel series illustrated by Fuzichoco
- I Lost My Adventurer's License, but It's Fine Because I Have an Adorable Daughter Now, another light novel series illustrated by Fuzichoco
