= Fukushū o Koinegau Saikyō Yūsha wa =

Japanese light novel series

- Fukushū o Koinegau Saikyō Yūsha wa, Yami no Chikara de Senmetsu Musō Suru
- Cover art of the first light novel

復讐を希う最強勇者は、闇の力で殲滅無双する
- Novel series
- Written by: Manimani Ononata
- Published by: Shōsetsuka ni Narō
- Published: October 12, 2018
- Light novel
- Written by: Manimani Ononata
- Illustrated by: Kōya
- Published by: Shueisha
- Imprint: D Novels
- Original run: February 8, 2019 – present
- Volumes: 5
- Manga
- Written by: Manimani Ononata
- Illustrated by: Akira Sakamoto
- Published by: Shueisha
- Imprint: Young Jump Comics
- Magazine: Dash X Comic
- Original run: February 4, 2019 – present
- Volumes: 17

Fukushū o Koinegau Saikyō Yūsha wa, Yami no Chikara de Senmetsu Musō Suru (復讐を希う最強勇者は、闇の力で殲滅無双する) is a Japanese light novel series written by Manimani Ononata and illustrated by Kōya.

The novel was first published online by Ononata on Shōsetsuka ni Narō in October 2018, but was taken down shortly after due to the depiction of heavy violence. Japanese publisher Shūeisha acquired the rights and began publishing the series in print in February 2019 and has five volumes released as of August 2025. A manga adaptation by Akira Sakamoto started in February 2019, with sixteen volumes published as of September 2025.

The story follows the hero Raoul Evans who defeated the demon lord but was sentenced to death for being falsely accused of a crime he did not commit. In his last moments, he swore to take revenge on everyone who did him wrong.

== Synopsis ==
After defeating the demon lord, the hero, Raoul, returns to his hometown to find it destroyed and himself accused as the culprit. Imprisoned and tortured, he learns that this was all a scheme by his country's princess to force him into marrying her, with his companions all being in on it, having only ever used him to enrich themselves. Sentenced to death by pyre after refusing the princess's proposal, Raoul swears vengeance on those who wronged him in his final moments. Afterward, the hero forces the goddess who initially reincarnated him into this world to resurrect him, and he then sets out to bring karmic punishment to his betrayers.

== Characters ==
=== Main characters ===
Raoul Evans (ラウル・エヴァンス, Rauru Evansu)
The former hero who defeated the demon lord. Instead of being praised, he was imprisoned after being falsely accused of a crime he did not commit. He was tortured, raped, and drugged during imprisonment.
When Princess Victoria offered to spare his life if he was willing to serve under her, he refused and was sentenced to death by being crucified while eaten alive. In his last moments, Raul swears to avenge all who did him wrong. Now returned to life with greater power than ever before possessed, The Former Hero takes his sweet time traveling the countryside, confronting and barbarizing every one of his false companions and supporters with murderous glee.
Theodorá
The younger sister of the demon lord whom Raoul killed. She holds a grudge against the fallen hero. Even though both worked together temporarily to save her kin from a slave trader who was torturing and killing them for fun.
She killed Raoul once when he placed Cristiana's corpse next to Victoria's.
Sometime after that, she was found by the enclave of demons from her old home kingdom. By the time they found and nursed her, she was left a skin-and-bone husk who'd lost the will to live. But would immediately perk up after receiving a letter from the now-deified Hero Raul upon his second resurrection.

=== Targets ===
Victoria (ビクトリア, Bikutoria)
The princess of the Kingdom of Kurtz, who masterminded the destruction of Raoul's hometown before framing and imprisoning him. She intended to blackmail him into marrying her as part of her plan to become queen. However, this failed when, despite all the torture that he endured, the hero still turned her down, prompting her to have him executed instead. Following the hero's resurrection, he takes revenge on her several times. First, he ruins her public image by exposing her true, sadistic nature to the public before later conspiring with her father, the king, to have her disinherited and handed over to him, after which he crucifies her and leaves her to be eaten by various animals, all whilst still keeping her alive.
Sandra Divas (サンドラ・デイヴァーズ, Sandora Deivāzu)
A knightess in service to Victoria and the actual culprit responsible for the destruction of Raoul's hometown, which she did under the princess's orders. Even after falling out of favor with Victoria for failing to stop the resurrected hero from ruining the princess's reputation, which led to her incarceration and torture, she remained sycophantically loyal to her baneful mistress. Raoul would ultimately exploit this fealty and underlying jealousy of Raul by disguising himself as Victoria and tricking her into committing political murders, prompting the real Victoria to order her public execution to save face. This drives her further into madness and prompts Sandra to fatally stab the princess before committing suicide so as to reunite with her in the afterlife, a wish denied when Raoul keeps the princess alive for further retribution.
Wendel Blackwood (ウェンデル・ブラックウーッド, Wenderu Burakkuwuuddo)
An archmage and one of Raoul's former companions. While seemingly the hero's best friend, in truth, he only ever sought to profit off him and hated his naivete, taking sadistic joy in watching him get betrayed. He was initially unconcerned when Raoul began his revenge quest due to the hero's "eye-for-an-eye" policy, as he never directly did anything to him or his loved ones. However, Raoul finds a workaround by trapping him in an illusory world where he is repeatedly killed and humiliated, which is technically retribution for deceiving him.
Cristiana Alcott (クリスティアナ・オルコット, Kurisutiana Orukotto)
A saintess and one of Raoul's former companions. While seemingly a pure-hearted maiden, in truth, she is a corrupt religious zealot who believes that achieving "salvation" means giving in to one's basest desires. Christiana is indirectly responsible for all the tragedies in Raoul's life (in manga), as she compelled many of the culprits to carry them out through her powers. In the end, she is executed after her crimes are exposed, believing to the end that she was correct, only for Raoul to finally shatter her faith by pursuing her to the afterlife and revealing that, for her actions, she has been damned to hell alongside those she corrupted.
Lucas Ekart (ルーカス・エッカート, Ruukasu Eiikato)
An adept military specialist who makes a sizable fortune working for the greedy and decadent hierarchy of Kurtz as a private assassin on the side.
Being yet another target of Raul's vengeance due to having had a hand in killing off the former hero's companions who aided him in storming the Demon Lord's territory before his betrayal for profit. Ekart is stalked to his own home and then brutally killed via force-feeding of a sizable amount of blood money he had accumulated before bursting like a balloon right before the eyes of his equally reviled sister.
Raul would assume his guise via Illusion Magic to hunt down and terminate yet another revenge target afterward. Lucas himself winds up in hell for his prior crimes in life and is manifested before his murderer by the God of Hell when the former hero confronts him.
The Goddess of Love (愛の女神, Ai No Megami)
The original benefactor of Saintess Cristiana and obsessive co-conspirator to Raul's pursuit of vengeance. A hideously demented passion addict who stands at the heart & soul of hero Raul's strife throughout his young life.
While acting as the sole ally in his pocket, revitalizing him after horrifically dying due to false accusation, unlocking his hidden darkness powers that had been initially sealed by the goddess herself. It is later revealed that she is yet another mark on Raul's hit list, having masterminded his fall into pandemonium in the first place.
Regularly abusing and working her to the bone, even when aiding him so many times, had supposedly cost the goddess her divinity. Raul finally severed ties with her by revealing her crimes to every sinner in hell before having said sleaze violated in the same manner he was, a repulsive-looking troll monster burying her alive in a recreation of the dungeon he rotted in before the execution.
Rene Beneke (リーネ・ベネケ, Riine Baneke)
One ruthless pharmaceutical adept and openly depraved mad scientist, Dr. Beneke is a world-renowned medical practitioner who often perfects her work upon helpless citizens who stand about as young as children.
Not being above hiring contract killers to procure copious amounts of test subjects for her thesis. She ruthlessly eviscerates and probes the destructive limit threshold in which she can push the boundaries of her research at the expense of everyone on whom the deranged physician runs her practice upon. Even her next of kin are fair game in that regard.
She overestimates her genius when faced with the rage of the fallen hero, now resurrected to exact revenge upon Beneke and her family.
Seeing through his disguise as the family bodyguard but failing to notice she is beside herself as her father & brother are already dead and under Raul's control till the last minute, after trekking through her bloody laboratory, the hero forces her to undergo trial after trial of berserker chemical ingestion until she dies from stress overload. Raul crucifies her mummified remains and adds them to his collection of defeated revenge marks.
Bernard Ross (バーナード・ロス, BaNaDo Rosu)
Brother-in-law to Raul via marriage to his sister, Claire Evans. He often goes about town voicing his hatred of the Former Hero while crying his heart out to anyone who will listen, often getting handouts of sympathy in return. In truth, Ross was a scheming marriage embezzler who repeatedly conned many a waiting bride-to-be out of their valuables to feed himself.
While not taking a direct part in Raul's downfall, he gladly abandoned his recent mark, while Claire was heavy with child no less, to be violated by the corrupt clergymen of the church while he was shaked-up with another strumpet at the time of her deathly cries. As if a show of further selfishness, he teamed up with the National Mages to kill the revived Dark Hero for more outstanding status accolades by sacrificing the few remaining loyalists in the kingdom for their black magic rituals. People who trusted him to lead their charge against Raul's fanatics.
He would meet his end by the hero turned divine, showing him how his pettiness and conniving murdered the only person who truly loved him. Being stuck with an illusion of she whose faith Bernard had betrayed twice over after the revelation of his true self was revealed, Raul would leave him crying over his loss till the day he dies.
The God of Hell (地獄を司る神, Jigoku O Tsukasadoru Kami)
A brutal, tyrannical bully who loathes and brushes off human mortals as insects. He lords over the domain in which baleful men and women on Earth find themselves after they die with an iron hand; even his subordinates are not safe from his juvenile rage. Spiteful and petty. The God of Hell holds an exceptional loathing of Raul, which caused the rest of the conclave of gods to abandon him while he was betrayed and executed. The reason being he lost a wager due to the former hero and holds him in particular disfavor for it.
Having brushed off the god's chosen savior of the world for such paltry inclinations. Raul made it a pointed venture to drag the hated hell deity from his throne before ending him with a godly artifact made for killing members of his despicable pantheon. Having heard tell that Raul had come into his domain unbidden, the petty god chose to spite Raul further by drumming up all the gutter scum the former hero personally escorted to his domain, only to erase their souls, causing cessation of existence, thus preempting their eternal torment.
For that, Raul challenged Hell's deity to a game. When he was on the losing end of their contest, the God of Hell became more and more irate. Seeking to unmake the realm he lorded over to assuage his bad temper. Only to find he'd been tricked by he whom the foolish divinity cursed at with powerful illusory magic that waylaid the attempt, having been thoroughly bested. Raul humiliated the evil supremacy before his men after getting him to sign over his power & territory to him, only to be summarily decapitated after feebly bleating for mercy to his hated adversary.

== Media ==
=== Light novel ===
Manimani Ononata published the first chapters of the novel on the online publishing platform Shōsetsuka ni Narō on October 12, 2018, but was taken down shortly after due to the drastic depiction of violence could violate the guidelines of the platform. In October 2018, the work ranked first on the page intern ranking.

In February 2019, Japanese publisher Shueisha released the first volume of the novel under its D Novels imprint. As of August 2025, five volumes have been published. The novels were published in South Korea by publisher S Novel Plus.

=== Manga ===
On February 4, 2019, Ononata started publishing a manga adaptation on Shueisha's Dash X Comic section on the Nico Nico Seiga platform. The illustrations were done by Akira Sakamoto based on the original character designs by Kōya, who illustrated the light novel.

The first volume was published in print by Shueisha on September 19, 2019. As of September 2025, sixteen volumes have been published in Japan. French publisher Delcourt announced on March 25, 2022, to publish the manga in French language under the name The Brave Wish Revenging. Somy Media publishes the manga in South Korea starting in September 2022.

== See also ==
- I Lost My Adventurer's License, but It's Fine Because I Have an Adorable Daughter Now, another light novel series written by Manimani Ononata
- Redo of Healer
