= Hiroki Yasumoto =

Japanese voice actor and narrator (born 1977)

- 安元 洋貴
- Born: March 16, 1977 (age 49); Yamaguchi Prefecture, Japan
- Education: Komazawa University
- Occupations: Voice actor, narrator
- Years active: 2003–present
- Agent: Sigma Seven
- Notable credits: Bleach as Yasutora Sado; Fairy Tail as Elfman Strauss and Draculos Hyberion; Sword Art Online as Agil; Hetalia: Axis Powers as Germany; Yowamushi Pedal as Shingo Kinjou; Kyouran Kazoku Nikki as Midarezaki Teika; Street Fighter as Guile; Hozuki's Coolheadedness as Hōzuki; Black Butler as Agni

Hiroki Yasumoto (安元 洋貴, Yasumoto Hiroki; born March 16, 1977) is a Japanese voice actor and narrator. He belongs to Sigma Seven. His representative works are Hozuki's Coolheadedness (Hozuki), Bleach (Yasutora Sado), Hetalia: Axis Powers (Germany), Super Soccer (narration), and Close-up Gendai (narration).

== Filmography ==
=== Anime series ===
Year	Title	Role	Notes
2004	Bleach	Yasutora Sado	
2004	Inuyasha	Villager	Episode 149
2004	Kyo Kara Maoh!	Large Cimarron executive	
2004	Rockman.EXE Stream	Colonel	
2004	School Rumble	Masaru Suzuki, Masakazu Tougou	
2005	Akahori Gedou Hour Rabuge	Ant Soldier A, Glasses Girl Fetish Salesman, Keisuke Gokumon, Male Stand-up Comedian A	
2005	Best Student Council	Doctor B	Episode 24
2005	Eureka Seven	Norma 01	Episode 7
2005	Gallery Fake	Giorgo	Episode 3
2005	Hell Girl	Reporter, Saki's Father	
2005	Honey and Clover	Operator B	Episode 1
2005	Noein: To Your Other Self	Nakamura Tatsuyoshi	
2005	Rockman.EXE Beast	Colonel/Zoano Colonel, Yetiman	
2005	Sanada 10 The Animation	Hattori Masashige	
2005	Strain: Strategic Armored Infantry	Brad Radflicks	
2005	Zoids: Genesis	Col. Byd	
2006	009-1	Man	
2006	BakéGyamon	Extra mirror	
2006	Binchō-tan	Man	
2006	Black Blood Brothers	Cain Warlock	
2006	Buso Renkin	Chono Family Bodyguard	Episode 6
2006	Coyote Ragtime Show	Aren, Newscaster	
2006	Digimon Savers	Belphemon, Franz Norstein	
2006	Galaxy Angel	Agent A, Banchō, Fleet A, Military A	
2006	Glass Fleet	Soldier C	Episode 8
2006	Hataraki Man	Reporter B	Episode 4
2006	Hell Girl: Two Mirrors	Angler, Masato's Father, Tatsuhiko Makimura	
2006	Mamoru-kun ni Megami no Shukufuku o!	Takasu Masaki	
2006	Otogi-Jushi Akazukin	Asel	
2006	Rec	AD, game director, Tanaka's Boyfriend, writer	
2006	Ring ni Kakero	Nobi	
2006	Soul Link	Researcher	Episode 10
2006	Tokyo Tribes	Falcon Jokasaki	
2006	Tona-Gura!	Ruins villager	Episode 2
2006	Witchblade	Cop	
2007	Baccano!	Inspector Bill Sullivan	
2007	Bakugan Battle Brawlers	Golem	
2007	Code-E	Group of 4 Managers	Episode 7
2007	Dōjin Work	Justice	
2007	Fantastic Detective Labyrinth	TV caster	
2007	Giant Robo	Kansas, News Narration	
2007	Good Luck! Ninomiya-kun	Bunny	
2007	Heroic Age	Bellcross, Captain, Councillor, Kilis, Operator	
2007	Higurashi When They Cry	Doctor, Policeman, Professor, Villager, Watchdog troop, Yamainu	
2007	KimiKiss: Pure Rouge	Chef, Teacher	
2007	Mushi-Uta	Station employee	
2007	Neuro: Supernatural Detective	Kouhei Tsukushi	Episode 24
2007	Nodame Cantabile	Oliver	
2007	Over Drive	Audience	
2007	Potemayo	Jersey-sensei, Morio	
2007	Rental Magica	Yudaikus Tholoide	
2007	Romeo × Juliet	Chairman	
2007	Shakugan no Shana Second	Bifrons ("The Wanderer")	
2007	Shining Tears X Wind	Hyoun	
2007	Shion no Ō	Male caster, Reporter B	
2007	Sisters of Wellber	Captain Zuppe	
2007	Toward the Terra	Ataraxia mayor, Commanding Officer Guard, Sid Johan, Toki	
2007	You're Under Arrest: Full Throttle	Black-Suit Man 2, Man & Teizō Saejima	
2008	Black Butler	Agni	
2008	Blassreiter	Researcher, XAT Team	
2008	Casshern Sins	Robot	Episode 2
2008	Dazzle	Sergeant	Episode 8-9
2008	Glass Maiden	Graham	
2008	Golgo 13	Falcão's Man	Episode 21
2008	Gunslinger Girl -Il Teatrino-	Franco	
2008	Itazura na Kiss	Kakujirou, Nishimura, Yacchan	
2008	Kyouran Kazoku Nikki	Midarezaki Teika	
2008	Natsume's Book of Friends	Susugi	Episode 2
2008	Neo Angelique Abyss -Second Age-	Universe Conscious	Episode 13
2008	Nodame Cantabile: Paris-Hen	Oliver	
2008	Nogizaka Haruka no Himitsu	Takenami	
2008	Persona -trinity soul-	Udo Taiichi	
2008	School Rumble: 2nd Semester	Kouriyama-sensei	
2008	The Tower of Druaga	Utu	
2008	Vampire Knight	Yagari Touga	
2008	Vampire Knight Guilty	Yagari Touga	
2008	Zenryoku Usagi	Leader	
2009	Battle Spirits: Shōnen Gekiha Dan	Gaana	
2009	Bleach	Zonzain	
2009	Clannad After Story!	Waiter	Episode 14
2009	Fairy Tail	Elfman	
2009	Hetalia: Axis Powers	Germany	
2009	Natsu no Arashi!	Murata Hideo	
2009	Nogizaka Haruka no Himitsu: Purezza	Takenami	
2009	Sōten Kōro	Zhang Liao	
2009	The Tower of Druaga: The Aegis of Uruk	Utu	
2010	Black Butler II	Agni	
2010	Bakugan Battle Brawlers New Vestroia	Golem	
2010	Durarara!!	Hiroshi	
2010	Giant Killing	Commentary, TV caster	
2010	Nodame Cantabile: Finale	Oliver	
2010	Nura: Rise of the Yokai Clan	Aotabo	
2010	Ring ni Kakero 1: Shadow	Nobi	
2010	SD Gundam Sangokuden Brave Battle Warriors	Kan-u Gundam	
2010	Nura: Rise of the Yokai Clan - Demon Capital	Aotabo	
2010	Shukufuku no Campanella	Golem, Nagan Maycraft	
2010	Tegami Bachi	Brito	
2010	The Legend of the Legendary Heroes	Guard	Episode 24
2011	Ben-To	Tadaaki Endō	
2011	C	Entre	
2011	Gin Tama	Captain Koro	
2011	Heaven's Memo Pad	Electric pole	
2011	I Don't Like You at All, Big Brother!!	Grilled squid shop owner	
2011	Is This a Zombie?	Kerberos Wansard	
2011	Maken-ki!	Hideki Hebiyama	
2011	Nura: Rise of the Yokai Clan - Demon Capital	Aotabo	
2011	Toriko	Gido	
2012	Aquarion Evol	Kamurogi Izumo	
2012	Battle Spirits: Sword Eyes	Brau Balm	
2012	Battle Spirits: Saikyou Ginga Ultimate Zero	Ultimate-Grand-Woden	
2012	Bodacious Space Pirates	Show	
2012	Daily Lives of High School Boys	Vice-President	
2012	Hiiro no Kakera: The Tamayori Princess Saga	Eins	
2012	Horizon in the Middle of Nowhere II	Takakane Hironaka	
2012	Ixion Saga DT	Narrator	Episode 6
2012	Kuroko's Basketball	Genta Takeuchi(Kaijo team coach)	
2012	Mobile Suit Gundam AGE	Derek Shackrow	
2012	Shining Hearts: Shiawase no Pan	Mysterious voice, Variant pirate	
2012	Sword Art Online	Agil, Andrew Gilbert Mills	
2012	Tantei Opera Milky Holmes: Act 2	Sniper	
2012	World War Blue	Jaku	
2013	Arata: The Legend	Tsutsuga	
2013	Bakumatsu Gijinden Roman	Perry	
2013	Battle Spirits: Saikyou Ginga Ultimate Zero	Ultimate-Grand-Woden	
2013	Battle Spirits: Sword Eyes Gekitōden	Brau Balm	
2013	Chōsoku Henkei Gyrozetter	Eraser Jack	
2013	Devils and Realist	Baphomet	
2013	Genshiken Nidaime	Mitsunori Kugayama	
2013	Gifū Dōdō!! Kanetsugu to Keiji	Kagekatsu Uesugi	
2013	High School DxD New	Kokabiel	
2013	Meganebu!	Hotaka Shirogane	
2013	Naruto Shippuden	Han, Son Gokū	
2013	Problem Children Are Coming from Another World, Aren't They?	Galdo Gasper	
2013	Samurai Flamenco	Alien Flamenco, Mr. Justice, Narration	
2013	Senran Kagura	Murasame	
2013	Sword Art Online: Extra Edition	Agil	
2013	The Devil Is a Part-Timer!	Albertio Ende	
2013	Tokyo Ravens	Kakuygouki	
2013	Yowamushi Pedal	Shingo Kinjō	
2014	Aldnoah.Zero	Vlad	
2014	Bakumatsu Rock	Ii Naosuke	
2014	Battle Spirits: Saikyou Ginga Ultimate Zero	Ultimate-Grand-Woden	
2014	Black Butler: Book of Murder	Agni	
2014	Case Closed	Osamu Kuranishi, Ryousuke Sawada, Kohji Haneda	
2014	D-Frag!	Mob Father	
2014	Future Card Buddyfight	Jackknife Dragon, Principal Malcom Nigirikobushi	
2014	Hajime no Ippo Rising	young Hama Dankichi	
2014	Hozuki's Coolheadedness	Hōzuki	
2014	Laughing Under the Clouds	Seiichirou Takamine	
2014	Majin Bone	Tyrone/Rhino	52 Episodes
2014	Nobunaga Concerto	Imagawa's shinobi	
2014	Rail Wars!	Driver, Man	
2014	Sword Art Online II	Agil, Andrew Gilbert Mills	
2014	The Comic Artist and Assistants	Kouken Tomito	
2014	Yowamushi Pedal Grande Road	Shingo Kinjou	
2015	Cute High Earth Defense Club Love!	Thunder/Zundar	
2015	Death Parade	Fujii	
2015	Durarara!!×2	Hiroshi	
2015	Duel Masters Versus Revolution	Zakira	
2015	Future Card Buddyfight 100	Jackknife Dragon	
2015	Gate: Jieitai Kanochi nite, Kaku Tatakaeri	Akira Tomita	
2015	Himouto! Umaru-chan	Takeshi "Bonba" Motoba	
2015	Marvel Disk Wars: The Avengers	Blade	
2015	One-Punch Man	King	
2015	Sky Wizards Academy	Real Nua	
2015	The Heroic Legend of Arslan	Kishuard	
2015	Triage X	Wild Hunt	
2015	Ushio and Tora	Stone Eater	
2015	Young Black Jack	Bob	
2016	Active Raid	Makoto Shimura	
2016	Berserk	Azan	
2016	Cheer Boys!!	Jin Dōmoto	
2016	Concrete Revolutio: The Last Song	Koichi Amato	Episode 16
2016	Cute High Earth Defense Club LOVE! LOVE!	Dadacha	
2016	Danganronpa 3: The End of Hope's Peak High School	Nekomaru Nidai	
2016	Days	Susumu Inohara	
2016	Drifters	Hijikata Toshizo	
2016	Food Wars! Shokugeki no Soma: The Second Plate	Subaru Mimasaka	
2016	Future Card Buddyfight Triple D	Jacknife Dragon	
2016	Grimgar of Fantasy and Ash	Britney	
2016	KonoSuba	Dullahan	
2016	Kuma Miko: Girl Meets Bear	Natsu Kumai	
2016	Mobile Suit Gundam Unicorn RE:0096	Watts Stepny	
2016	Scared Rider Xechs	Granbach	
2016	The Heroic Legend of Arslan: Dust Storm Dance	Kishuard	
2016	The Kindaichi Case Files R	Kaito Sabaki	Episode 38-39
2016	Yuri on Ice	Christophe Giacometti	
2017	ACCA: 13-ku Kansatsu-ka	Payne	
2017	Ani × Para: Anata no Hero wa Dare Desu ka	Jay Hogan	
2017	Blood Blockade Battlefront & Beyond	Humphrey Tiger	Episode 3
2017	Boruto: Naruto Next Generations	Kinshiki Ōtsutsuki	
2017	Case Closed	Ryosuke Sawada	
2017	Dies Irae	Göetz Von Berlichingen	
2017	Future Card Buddyfight Triple D	Jacknife Dragon	
2017	Himouto! Umaru-chan R	Takeshi "Bonba" Motoba	
2017	Hozuki's Coolheadedness 2	Hōzuki	
2017	In Another World With My Smartphone	Leon Blitz	
2017	Infini-T Force	Raja Kaan	
2017	Juni Taisen: Zodiac War	Duedeculpe	
2017	March Comes in Like a Lion	Junkei Yamazaki	
2017	PriPri Chi-chan!!	Yukio	
2017	One Piece	Bonam	
2017	Sengoku Night Blood	Nobuhara Baba	
2017	Tiger Mask W	Billy the Kidman	
2017	The Ancient Magus' Bride	Spriggan	
2017	Vatican Miracle Examiner	Bill Suskins	
2017	Yowamushi Pedal: New Generation	Shingo Kinjou	
2018	Aguu: Tensai Ningyō	Erbat	
2018	Black Blood Brothers	Cain Warlock	
2018	Cute High Earth Defense Club HAPPY KISS!	Furanui	
2018	Devils' Line	Mercenary	
2018	Fairy Tail 3	Draculos Hyberion	
2018	Future Card Buddyfight Ace	Jackknife Dragon	
2018	Grand Blue	Shinji Tokita	
2018	Hataraku Oniisan!	Matsuban-senpai, Mizudako	
2018	Hi Score Girl	Guile-san	
2018	Inazuma Eleven: Orion no Kokuin	Clario Orvan	
2018	Megalobox	Yūri	
2018	Souten no Ken Re:Genesis	Robert Arendt	
2018	Sword Art Online: Alicization	Agil	
2018	The Legend of the Galactic Heroes Die Neue These Kaikō	Karl Gustav Kemp	
2018	Skull-face Bookseller Honda-san	Fullface	
2018	The Thousand Musketeers	Einz	
2018	Zombie Land Saga	MC	Episode 5
2019	Aware! Meisaku-kun	J-san, Poverty god	
2019	Carole & Tuesday	Skip	
2019	Fairy Gone	E.J. Devin Thor	
2019	Fire Force	Charon	
2019	Kemono Michi: Rise Up	Kobold husband	
2019	Meiji Tokyo Renka	Yukichi Fukuzawa	
2019	Mix: Meisei Story	Daisuke Nikaidō	
2019	One-Punch Man 2	King	
2019	Sword Art Online: Alicization – War of Underworld	Agil	
2019	The Rising of the Shield Hero	Elhart	
2019	To the Abandoned Sacred Beasts	Edgar (Basilisk)	
2019	Vinland Saga	Bjorn	
2020	Baki S2	Shunsei Kaku	
2020	Butt Detective	Hanagashi	
2020	By the Grace of the Gods	Ryoma Takebayashi (adult)	
2020	Crayon Shin-chan	Director, Teruo Sanbe	
2020	Fire Force S2	Charon	
2020	Gleipnir	Tadanori Sanbe	
2020	Grand Blues!	Jin	
2020	Healin' Good Pretty Cure	Guaiwaru, Chikara	
2020	Kingdom 3	Rin Bu Kun	
2020	Moriarty the Patriot	Mycroft Holmes	
2020	Pet	Inui	
2020	The God of High School	Seo Hanryang	
2020	The Millionaire Detective Balance: Unlimited	Poliador President	Episode 5
2020	Yashahime: Princess Half-Demon	Konton	
2021	Battle Game in 5 Seconds	Hajime Ogami	
2021	Burning Kabaddi	Ayumu Rokugen	
2021	Everything for Demon King Evelogia	MacKiddie	
2021	Ex-Arm	Nguyen	
2021	Kick & Slide	Firere	
2021	Mazica Party	Wanisuke	
2021	Megalobox 2: Nomad	Yūri	
2021	My Hero Academia 5	Daigorō Banjō	
2021	Ranking of Kings	Apis	
2021	The Vampire Dies in No Time	Micro Bikini	
2021	The World's Finest Assassin Gets Reincarnated in Another World as an Aristocrat	Special forces member	Episode 4
2021	True Cooking Master Boy Season 2	Alkan	
2021	Wave!!: Let's Go Surfing!!	Shop Manager	
2022	Aoashi	Nozomi Date	
2022	Bleach: Thousand-Year Blood War	Yasutora Sado	
2022	Cardfight!! Vanguard will+Dress	Musashi Uryū	
2022	Fantasia Sango - Realm of Legends	Mouryou King	Episode 11-12
2022	I'm the Villainess, So I'm Taming the Final Boss	Jasper Varie	
2022	Love After World Domination	Culverin Bear	
2022	Mahjong Soul Pong	Osamu Saitō	
2022	Ninjala	Ron	
2022	Princess Connect! Re:Dive 2	Hiroki	Episode 2
2022	She Professed Herself Pupil of the Wise Man	Asbal	
2022	Smile of the Arsnotoria	Bruno Bullinger	Episode 7
2022	Spy × Family	Bill Watkins, Wesley Watkins	Episode 10
2022	Teppen!!!!!!!!!!!!!!! Laughing 'til You Cry	Seiji Tani	
2022	The Prince of Tennis II: U-17 World Cup	Hōō Byōdōin	
2022	Welcome to Demon School! Iruma-kun Season 3	Orobas Coco	
2023	Frieren: Beyond Journey's End	Qual	
2023	Jujutsu Kaisen 2nd Season	Shiu Kong	
2023	MF Ghost	Fūjin Ishigami	
2023	Nier: Automata Ver1.1a	Pod 042	
2023	Soaring Sky! Pretty Cure	Dragon Tribe	
2023	Sorcerous Stabber Orphen: Sanctuary Arc	Jack	
2023	TenPuru	Friend	Episode 1
2023	The Masterful Cat Is Depressed Again Today	Yukichi	
2023	The Misfit of Demon King Academy II	Eges Code	
2023	The Most Heretical Last Boss Queen	Roderick	
2023	Too Cute Crisis	Battra Swunk	
2023	Undead Unluck	Creed	
2023	Urusei Yatsura	Narrator	Episode 21
2023	Why Raeliana Ended Up at the Duke's Mansion	Nick Maddocks	
2024	Metallic Rouge	Graufon Berg	
2024	Sasaki and Peeps	Viscount Mueller	
2024	The Weakest Tamer Began a Journey to Pick Up Trash	Rickbert	
2025	Clevatess	Dorel	
2025	Binan Kōkō Chikyū Bōei-bu Haikara!	Kyan	
2025	Dr. Stone: Science Future	Brody	
2025	Kaiju No. 8 Season 2	Eiji Hasegawa	
2025	Necronomico and the Cosmic Horror Show	Game Master	
2025	New Saga	Zentos	
2025	Night of the Living Cat	Tanishi	
2025	Ninja vs. Gokudo	Uryū Yagi	
2025	Rurouni Kenshin: Kyoto Disturbance	Ryūsaku Arato	
2025	Sakamoto Days	Hyo	
2025	A Gentle Noble's Vacation Recommendation	Shadow	
2025	Hell Teacher: Jigoku Sensei Nube	Bakki	
2026	Witch Hat Atelier	Galga	
2026	The Ghost in the Shell	Batou	
2027	I Lost My Adventurer's License, but It's Fine Because I Have an Adorable Daughter Now	Douglas	

=== Original video animation ===
Year	Title	Role	Notes	Source
2005	Karas	Photographer		
2005	Otogi-Jūshi Akazukin OVA	Spiderfang		
2005	School Rumble OVA: First Semester Extra Class	Togo Masakazu		
2005	Tank Police Team: TANK S.W.A.T. 01	Officer Katsu		
2006	BALDR FORCE EXE Resolution	Researcher		
2006	Hellsing OVA	Ghoul		
2006	Honey × Honey Drops	Teacher		
2006	Maria-sama ga Miteru OVA	Hanadera Gakuin Student		
2007	Nasu: A Migratory Bird with Suitcase	Masser		
2007	Tales of Symphonia The Animation	Desian A, Flying dragon arranger		
2008	School Rumble: 3rd Semester	Togo Masakazu		
2008	Shina Dark	Vincent		
2008	Street Fighter IV: The Ties That Bind	Guile		
2009	Black Butler: His Butler, Performer	Agni		
2009	Tenchi Muyo! War on Geminar	Babalun Mesut		
2010	Mobile Suit Gundam Unicorn	Watts Stepney		
2010	Super Street Fighter IV	Guile		
2011	Air Gear: Kuro no Hane to Nemuri no Mori	Black Burn		
2011	Fairy Tail OVA	Elfman		
2011	Shukufuku no Campanella OVA	Golem, Nagan Maycraft		
2012	Nogizaka Haruka no Himitsu: Finale	Takenami		
2013	Iron Man: Rise of Technovore	War Machine/James "Rhodey" Rhodes		
2013	Transformers Go!	Ganoh		
2013	Yowamushi Pedal: Special Ride	Shingo Kinjou		
2014	Black Butler: Book of Murder	Agni		
2014	The New Prince of Tennis OVA vs Genius 10	Hōō Byōdōin		
2015	Hozuki's Coolheadedness OVA	Hōzuki		
2015	Hozuki's Coolheadedness OVA 2	Hōzuki		
2015	Hozuki's Coolheadedness OVA 3	Hōzuki		
2016	Queen's Blade Grimoire	Triton-ou		
2017	Cute High Earth Defense Club LOVE! LOVE! LOVE!	Thunder/Zundar		
2017	Hozuki's Coolheadedness OVA 4	Hōzuki		
2017	Super Danganronpa 2.5: Komaeda Nagito to Sekai no Hakaisha	Nekomaru Nidai		
2018	Inazuma Eleven Reloaded	Clario Orvan		
2019	Hi Score Girl OVA	Guile, Ikaiyō Ulcer		
2020	ACCA: 13-Territory Inspection Dept. - Regards	Payne		
2020	Hozuki's Coolheadedness Vol. 30 OAD	Hōzuki		
2020	Strike the Blood IV	Shido Okurayama		
2021	Saezuru Tori wa Habatakanai – Don't Stay Gold	Kanji Kageyama		
2021	The Ancient Magus' Bride: The Boy From the West and the Knight of the Mountain Haze	Spriggan		
2024	Code Geass: Rozé of the Recapture	Noland		

=== Original net animation ===
Year	Title	Role	Notes
2021	Hetalia: World Stars	Germany	
2022	Bastard!! -Heavy Metal, Dark Fantasy-	Gara	
2022	Kawaii Tanuki mo Raku ja nai	Ponkichi	
2023	Pluto	Mont Blanc	
2026	Yu-Gi-Oh! Card Game The Chronicles	Rugal	

=== Anime films ===
Year	Title	Role	Notes
2003	Inuyasha the Movie: Swords of an Honorable Ruler		
2005	Rockman EXE Hikari to Yami no Program	Colonel	
2006	Bleach: Memories of Nobody	Yasutora Sado	
2007	Bleach: The DiamondDust Rebellion	Yasutora Sado	
2007	Inukami! The Movie	Pervert A	
2008	Hells	Male Gatekeeper	
2008	The Garden of Sinners: Remaining Sense of Pain	Leeder	
2009	The Rebirth of Buddha	Tokuzo Kanemoto	
2010	Bleach: Hell Verse	Yasutora Sado	
2010	Hetalia: Axis Powers - Paint it, White!	Germany	
2010	SD Gundam Sangokuden Brave Battle Warriors: The Super-Duper Movie	Kan-u Gundam	
2011	Buddha 2: Tezuka Osamu no Buddha ~Owarinaki Tabi~		
2012	Fairy Tail the Movie: Phoenix Priestess	Elfman	
2012	Pokémon the Movie: Kyurem vs. the Sword of Justice	Terrakion	
2012	Smile PreCure! The Movie: Big Mismatch in a Picture Book!	Cow King	
2013	Patema Inverted	Jaku	
2014	Miniskirt Space Pirates: Abyss of Hyperspace	Show	
2015	Boruto: Naruto the Movie	Kinshiki Ōtsutsuki	
2015	Yowamushi Pedal Re: ROAD	Shingo Kinjou	
2015	Yowamushi Pedal: The Movie	Shingo Kinjou	
2016	Yowamushi Pedal: Spare Bike	Shingo Kinjou	
2017	Fairy Tail: Dragon Cry	Elfman	
2017	Sword Art Online The Movie: Ordinal Scale	Agil	
2017	Yowamushi Pedal: Re:GENERATION	Shingo Kinjou	
2018	Flavors of Youth	Steve	
2018	Uchū no Hō: Reimei-hen	Geopard	
2019	KonoSuba: God's Blessing on this Wonderful World! Legend of Crimson	Verdia	
2019	The Legend of the Galactic Heroes: Die Neue These Seiran	Karl Gustav Kemp	
2020	Fate/Grand Order - Divine Realm of the Round Table: Camelot - Wandering; Airgetlam	Agravain	
2020	Saezuru Tori wa Habatakanai – The Clouds Gather	Kanji Kageyama	
2020	Wave!!	Shop Manager	
2021	Fate/Grand Order - Divine Realm of the Round Table: Camelot - Paladin: Agateram	Agravain	
2021	Sword Art Online Progressive: Aria of a Starless Night	Agil	
2024	Crayon Shin-chan: Ora's Dinosaur Diary	Bubble Odorokii	
2025	Cute High Earth Defense Club Eternal Love!	Thunder	
2026	Mobile Suit Gundam: Hathaway – The Sorcery of Nymph Circe	Fabio Rivera	
2027	Ghost	Karate	

=== Drama CD roles ===
- 1-en no Otoko (Kijima)
- Ai no Kotoba mo Shiranaide (Retsu Sonekawa)
- Bad Boys! (youth 1)
- Boku no Senpai (Saburo Ninomiya)
- Chocolate no Youni (Kajimoto)
- Critical Lovers (Takatou Shinobu)
- Danshi Meiro (Masami Oonuki)
- DeadLock series (Dick Burnford)
- Elektel Delusion/ Mousou Erekiteru (Motoki Fumihiro)
- Gomennasai to Ittemiro (Tougo Kuguno)
- Goshujinsama to Inu (Kazusa Gaiou)
- Hetalia: Axis Powers (Germany)
- Hitorijime Theory (Takao)
- Kichiku Megane Hisouchaku Ban I & II (Honda Kenji)
- Kichiku Megane Souchaku Ban I & II (Honda Kenji)
- Kindan Vampire Vol. 3 (Rudolf)
- Konna Otoko wa Aisareru (Retsu Sonekawa)
- Kuroi Ryuu wa Nido Chikau (Jade)
- Kuroshitsuji (Agni)
- Monthly Girls' Nozaki-kun (Umetarō Nozaki)
- Nejireta Edge (Yamaoka)
- Netsujou no Ori de Nemure (Souichirou Oomaru)
- Pretty Babies (Yuri Ibuki)
- Saezuru Tori wa Habatakanai – Kageyama
- Saint Seiya Episode.G (Pontos)
- Seikimatsu Tantei Club (John H Watson)
- Shuukan Soine vol. 2 (Jin)
- Toukasei Renai Souchi (Kazumi Makita)
- Usagigari (Munetsugu Kanou)
- Wakakusa Monogatari ~Kami Hikouki ni Notte~ (Hannah)
- Wasurenaide Itekure (Michiya Hatano)
- Yatamomo (Suda)
- Yuuwaku Recipe (Miura)
- Yuuwaku - Temptation (Yanase)

=== Tokusatsu ===
- Tensou Sentai Goseiger (2010) (Garyusu Alien Yuzeikusu of the Ice & Snow (ep. 3))
- Ultraman Retsuden (2012) (Alien Mefilas Sly of the Dark Magic)
- Ultra Zero Fight (2012) (Alien Mefilas Sly of the Dark Magic)
- Tokumei Sentai Go-Busters (2012) (Loupeloid (ep. 41))
- Zyuden Sentai Kyoryuger vs. Go-Busters: The Great Dinosaur Battle! Farewell Our Eternal Friends (2014) (Neo-Grifforzer)
- Ultraman Orb (2016) (Alien Mefilas Nostra (ep. 6, 9 - 10))
- Kaitou Sentai Lupinranger VS Keisatsu Sentai Patranger (2018-19) (Narration)
- Ultra Galaxy Fight: The Destined Crossroad (2022) (Absolute Titan)
- Kamen Rider Gavv (2024-25) (Bocca Jaldak)

=== Video games ===
Year	Title	Role	Notes	Source
2008–14	Street Fighter IV series	Guile		
2008	Tatsunoko vs. Capcom	Alex		
2009	Star Ocean: The Last Hope	Bacchus D-79		
2011	El Shaddai: Ascension of the Metatron	Uriel		
2012	Street Fighter X Tekken	Guile		
2012	Yakuza 5	Masato Aizawa		
2012	Danganronpa 2: Goodbye Despair	Nekomaru Nidai		
2013	Dragon's Dogma: Dark Arisen	Mason		
2013	Final Fantasy XIV: A Realm Reborn	Raubahn Aldynn		
2015	Final Fantasy XIV: Heavensward	Raubahn Aldynn		
2015	Dragon's Dogma Online	Pawn (Male)/Gerd		
2016	Street Fighter V	Guile		
2016	Breath of Fire 6	Gilliam		
2016	Dragon Quest Heroes II	Hassan		
2017	Danganronpa V3: Killing Harmony	Nekomaru Nidai		
2017	Fire Emblem Heroes	Legault		
2017	Nier: Automata	Pod 042		
2017	Final Fantasy XIV: Stormblood	Raubahn Aldynn		
2018	Blazblue centralfiction/chronophantasma	Azrael		
2018	Soulcalibur VI	Pod 042		
2019	Jump Force	Kane		
2019	Dead or Alive 6	Diego		
2019	Bloodstained: Ritual of the Night	Zangetsu		
2020	Resident Evil 3	Carlos Oliveira		
2020	Ninjala	Ron		
2020	The King of Fighters for Girls	Goenitz		
2021	NieR Replicant ver.1.22474487139...	Grimoire Weiss		
2021	Fortnite	Guile (Emote only)		
2021	Voice of Cards: The Isle Dragon Roars	Game Master	Microsoft Windows, Nintendo Switch, PlayStation 4	
2021	Gate of Nightmares	Ghran	iOS, Android	
2022	Cookie Run: Kingdom	Tea Knight Cookie	iOS, Android	
2022	Live A Live HD-2D Remake	Gori	Nintendo Switch	
2022	Tactics Ogre: Reborn	Barbas Dahd Geuse	Microsoft Windows, PlayStation 4, PlayStation 5, Nintendo Switch	
2022	Fitness Runners	Maverick	Nintendo Switch	
2022	Dragon Quest Treasures	Captain Levanter, Monsters	Nintendo Switch	
2022	Arknights	Czerny	iOS, Android	
2023	Street Fighter 6	Guile	Microsoft Windows, PlayStation 4, PlayStation 5, Xbox Series X/S	
2023	Sword Art Online: Last Recollection	Agil		
2023	Honkai: Star Rail	Svarog	iOS, Android, Microsoft Windows	
2025	Rusty Rabbit	Lucas	Microsoft Windows, Nintendo Switch, PlayStation 5	

- Animamundi: Dark Alchemist (2004) - Mephistopheles
- Mega Man Battle Network 5: Double Team DS (2004) - Colonel
- Bleach: Shattered Blade (2006) - Yasutora "Chad" Sado
- Warriors Orochi (2007) - Fu Xi
- Hetalia Academy (2007) - Germany
- Guilty Gear 2: Overture (2007) - Raven
- Warriors Orochi 2 (2008) - Fu Xi
- Guilty Gear XX Accent Core Plus (2008) - Raven/Crow
- Death Connection (2009) - Gloria
- Halo Wars (2009) - Sergeant John Forge
- Beast Master and Prince (2010) - Klaus
- Dynasty Warriors: Strikeforce 2 (2010) - Fu Xi
- Summon Night Granthese: Sword of Ruin and the Knight's Promise (2010) - Hilgis
- Super Street Fighter IV - Guile
- Last Ranker (2010) - Tylong
- Storm Lover (2010) - Tsukasa Sugai
- Harukanaru Toki no Naka de 5 (2011) - Shinsaku Takasugi
- 2nd Super Robot Wars Z: Hakai Hen (2011) - Aim Liard
- Fairy Tail Gekitotsu! Kardia Daiseidou (2011) - Elfman Strauss
- Storm Lover: Summer Love!! (2011) - Tsukasa Sugai
- Deus Ex: Human Revolution (2011) - Adam Jensen
- Warriors Orochi 3 (2011) - Fu Xi
- Asura's Wrath (2012) - Asura
- Beast Master and Prince: Snow Bride (2012) - Klaus
- Legasista (2012) - Shout
- 2nd Super Robot Wars Z: Saisei Hen (2012) - Aim Liard
- Chaos Rings II (2012) - Araki
- Resident Evil: Operation Raccoon City (2012) - Carlos Oliveira
- Fairy Tail: Zeref's Awakening (2012) - Elfman Strauss
- Grimm the Bounty Hunter (2012) - Bremen March
- BlazBlue: Chrono Phantasma (2012) - Azrael
- Naruto Shippuden: Ultimate Ninja Storm 3 (2013) - Han
- Horizon in the Middle of Nowhere Portable (2013) - Takakane Hironaka
- JoJo's Bizarre Adventure: All Star Battle (2013) - Ringo Roadagain
- Sword Art Online: Infinity Moment (2013) - Agil
- Dragon's Crown (2013) - Wizard
- Conception II: Children of the Seven Stars (2013) - Rhiod
- Storm Lover 2nd (2013) - Tsukasa Sugai
- The Legend of Heroes: Trails of Cold Steel (2013) - Victor S. Arseid
- Warriors Orochi 3 Ultimate (2013) - Fu Xi
- Yakuza Ishin! (2014) - Harada Sanosuke
- Super Robot Wars UX (2013) - Kan-u Gundam
- Ultra Street Fighter IV (2014) - Guile
- Sword Art Online: Hollow Fragment (2014) - Agil
- Naruto Shippuden: Ultimate Ninja Storm Revolution (2014) - Han
- The Legend of Heroes: Trails of Cold Steel II (2014) - Victor S. Arseid
- BlazBlue: Chronophantasma Extend (2014) - Azrael
- God Eater 2 Rage Burst (2015) - Isaac Feldman
- Harukanaru Toki no Naka de 6 (2015) - Murasame Satoya
- Sword Art Online: Lost Song (2015) - Agil
- Guilty Gear Xrd -REVELATOR- (2015) - Raven
- Arslan: The Warriors of Legend (2015) - Kishward
- BlazBlue: Central Fiction (2015) - Azrael
- Naruto Shippuden: Ultimate Ninja Storm 4 (2016) - Han
- Sword Art Online: Hollow Realization (2016) - Agil
- Super Smash Bros. Ultimate (2018) - Guile
- The Thousand Musketeers (2018) - Eins
- Ace Combat 7: Skies Unknown (2019) - Matias Torres
- Wizardry Variants Daphne (2024) - Gerard
- Code Geass: Lost Stories (2025) - Noland
- Dragon Ball Xenoverse 2 (2026) - Future's Doom

=== Dubbing roles ===
==== Live-action ====
Title	Role	Dubbing actor	Notes	Source
Justice League	Arthur Curry / Aquaman	Jason Momoa		
Aquaman	Arthur Curry / Aquaman	Jason Momoa		
Braven	Joe Braven	Jason Momoa		
Zack Snyder's Justice League	Arthur Curry / Aquaman	Jason Momoa		
Sweet Girl	Ray Cooper	Jason Momoa		
Dune	Duncan Idaho	Jason Momoa		
Slumberland	Flip	Jason Momoa		
Fast X	Dante Reyes	Jason Momoa		
The Flash	Arthur Curry / Aquaman	Jason Momoa		
The Fall Guy	Jason Momoa	Jason Momoa		
A Minecraft Movie	Garrett "The Garbage Man" Garrison	Jason Momoa		
Supergirl	Lobo	Jason Momoa		
Jurassic World	Barry	Omar Sy		
Lupin	Assane Diop	Omar Sy		
Jurassic World Dominion	Barry	Omar Sy		
Captain Marvel	Bron-Char	Rune Temte		
Carrie	Billy Nolan	Alex Russell		
City on a Hill	DeCourcy Ward	Aldis Hodge		
Doc – Nelle tue mani	Dr. Andrea Fanti	Luca Argentero		
Halo	Vannak-134	Bentley Kalu		
Indiana Jones and the Dial of Destiny	Hauke	Olivier Richters		
The Ipcress File	Harry Palmer	Joe Cole		
Jupiter Ascending	Caine Wise	Channing Tatum		
Mars	Robert Foucault	Sammi Rotibi		
Mulan	Chien-Po	Doua Moua		
No Time to Die	Primo	Dali Benssalah		
Peter Rabbit 2: The Runaway	Nigel Basil-Jones	David Oyelowo		
Red Election	Adam Cornwell	James D'Arcy		
Running Wild with Bear Grylls	Anthony Mackie			
Station Eleven	Tyler Leander	Daniel Zovatto		
Street Fighter	Guile	Cody Rhodes		
Teenage Mutant Ninja Turtles: Out of the Shadows	Bartender	Dean Winters		
While We're Young	Jamie Massey	Adam Driver		
Winning Time: The Rise of the Lakers Dynasty	Magic Johnson	Quincy Isaiah		

==== Animation ====
Title	Role	Notes	Source
PAW Patrol: The Movie	Gus		
Scoob!	Dynomutt		
Smallfoot	Thorp		
Turning Red	Jin Lee		

==== Narration ====
- Drain the Oceans (Season 3, episodes 6 to 10)
