= I Lost My Adventurer's License, but It's Fine Because I Have an Adorable Daughter Now =

Japanese light novel series

- First light novel volume cover

冒険者ライセンスを剥奪されたおっさんだけど、愛娘ができたのでのんびり人生を謳歌する (Bōkensha Raisensu o Hakudatsu Sareta Ossan da Kedo, Ai Musume ga Dekita no de Nonbiri Jinsei o Ōka Suru)
- Genre: Fantasy
- Novel series
- Written by: Manimani Ononata
- Published by: Shōsetsuka ni Narō
- Light novel
- Written by: Manimani Ononata
- Illustrated by: Fuzichoco
- Published by: SB Creative
- Imprint: GA Novel
- Original run: August 10, 2018 – present
- Volumes: 4
- Manga
- Written by: Manimani Ononata
- Illustrated by: Fumi Tadaura
- Published by: Square Enix
- English publisher: NA: Square Enix
- Imprint: Gangan Comics UP!
- Magazine: Manga Up!
- Original run: November 30, 2018 – present
- Volumes: 14
- Anime television series
- Directed by: Yuki Inaba
- Written by: Yuki Inaba
- Music by: Oh Shu; Daiki Okuno
- Studio: Studio Palette
- Original network: Tokyo MX, BS12
- Original run: January 8, 2027 – scheduled
- icon

I Lost My Adventurer's License, but It's Fine Because I Have an Adorable Daughter Now (Japanese: 冒険者ライセンスを剥奪されたおっさんだけど、愛娘ができたのでのんびり人生を謳歌する, Hepburn: Bōkensha Raisensu o Hakudatsu Sareta Ossan da Kedo, Ai Musume ga Dekita no de Nonbiri Jinsei o Ōka Suru) is a Japanese light novel series written by Manimani Ononata and illustrated by Fuzichoco. It was originally published as a web novel on the online publishing platform Shōsetsuka ni Narō, before SB Creative began publishing it as a light novel under their GA Novel imprint in August 2018, with four volumes released as of October 2022. A manga adaptation illustrated by Fumi Tadaura began serialization on Square Enix's Manga Up! service in November 2018, with fourteen volumes released as of June 2026. An anime television series adaptation produced by Studio Palette is set to premiere in January 2027.

== Plot ==
Douglas Ford, once a renowned magician, has fallen on hard times as he has grown older. Now 37 years old, he suffers from a condition that lowers his maximum HP whenever he uses a skill. His condition results in his performance suffering, leading to his adventurer's license also being revoked, preventing him from taking quests. He was also forced out of his party. He leaves the capital Balzac and is forced to go around doing various jobs and trying to find meaning in his life. At this low point in his life, he encounters a Fenrir, a human that was cursed into a wolf-like demon form. After initially failing to undo the curse, he succeeds, with the now-freed human revealing itself to be a young girl named Rabi. With her having no family or village to return to, Douglas decides to take Rabi in his care and raise her as his adopted daughter.

== Characters ==
Douglas Ford (ダグラス・フォード, Dagurasu Fōdo)
Voiced by: Hiroki Yasumoto
Rabi (ラビ)
Voiced by: Yuka Iguchi

== Media ==
=== Light novel ===
Manimani Ononata originally posted the series as a web novel on the online publishing platform Shōsetsuka ni Narō. SB Creative later began publishing it as a light novel under their GA Novel imprint, with the first volume releasing on August 10, 2018; four volumes have been released as of October 15, 2022. The web novel was deleted from Shōsetsuka ni Narō in February 2021.

No.	Release date	ISBN
1	August 10, 2018	978-4-7973-9722-2
2	December 15, 2018	978-4-7973-9893-9
3	May 15, 2019	978-4-8156-0181-2
4	October 15, 2022	978-4-8156-1438-6

=== Manga ===
A manga adaptation illustrated by Fumi Tadaura began serialization on Square Enix's Manga Up! web service on November 30, 2018. The series has been compiled into fourteen tankōbon volumes as of June 2026. The series' chapters are published in English by Square Enix on the Manga Up! service.

No.	Release date	ISBN
1	December 13, 2018	978-4-7575-5941-7
2	May 11, 2019	978-4-7575-6124-3
3	September 12, 2019	978-4-7575-6296-7
4	March 12, 2020	978-4-7575-6507-4
5	August 7, 2020	978-4-7575-6789-4
6	January 17, 2021	978-4-7575-7029-0
7	June 7, 2021	978-4-7575-7285-0
8	December 7, 2021	978-4-7575-7604-9
9	July 7, 2022	978-4-7575-8013-8
10	January 7, 2023	978-4-7575-8338-2
11	September 7, 2023	978-4-7575-8771-7
12	August 6, 2024	978-4-7575-9340-4
13	June 6, 2025	978-4-7575-9883-6
14	June 5, 2026	978-4-301-00562-9

=== Anime ===
An anime television series adaptation was announced during the "GA Fes 2026: GA 20th Anniversary" livestream event on January 4, 2026. It will be produced by Studio Palette and directed by Yuki Inaba, who will also handle the series composition and screenplay, with characters designed by Kaori Yoshikawa and music composed by Oh Shu and Daiki Okuno. The series is set to premiere on January 8, 2027, on Tokyo MX and BS12. The opening theme song is "Dekiai" (溺愛; lit. 'Doting'), performed by Satoko Shibata.

== See also ==
- The 8th Son? Are You Kidding Me?, another light novel series illustrated by Fuzichoco
- Fukushū o Koinegau Saikyō Yūsha wa, another light novel series written by Manimani Ononata
- She Professed Herself Pupil of the Wise Man, another light novel series illustrated by Fuzichoco
