= The 8th Son? Are You Kidding Me? =

Japanese light novel series

- First light novel volume cover

八男って､ それはないでしょう! (Hachi-nan tte, Sore wa Nai deshou!)
- Genre: Isekai
- Novel series
- Written by: Y.A
- Published by: Shōsetsuka ni Narō
- Original run: June 2013 – March 2017
- Light novel
- Written by: Y.A.
- Illustrated by: Fuzichoco
- Published by: Media Factory
- Imprint: MF Books
- Original run: April 2014 – present
- Volumes: 31 + 1 extra
- Manga
- Illustrated by: Hiroki Kusumoto
- Published by: Kadokawa Shoten
- Imprint: MF Comics
- Magazine: ComicWalker
- Original run: 2015 – present
- Volumes: 14
- Manga

Hachinan tte, Sore wa Nai Deshō! Hajimari no Monogatari
- Illustrated by: Vanillabou
- Published by: Kadokawa Shoten
- Imprint: MF Comics
- Magazine: ComicWalker
- Original run: December 19, 2019 – October 21, 2020
- Volumes: 2
- Anime television series
- Directed by: Tatsuo Miura
- Written by: Takeshi Miyamoto
- Music by: Minako Seki
- Studio: Shin-Ei Animation (Note: Production assistance (制作協力) for all episodes provided by SynergySP.)
- Licensed by: Crunchyroll
- Original network: Tokyo MX, BS11, AT-X
- Original run: April 2, 2020 – June 18, 2020
- Episodes: 12
- Light novel

Hachinan tte, Sore wa Nai Deshou! Misokkasu
- Written by: Y.A.
- Illustrated by: Fuzichoco
- Published by: Media Factory
- Imprint: MF Books
- Original run: May 25, 2023 – present
- Volumes: 4
- Manga

Hachinan tte, Sore wa Nai Deshou! Misokkasu -Episode.Erīze-
- Illustrated by: Magawo
- Published by: Kadokawa Shoten
- Imprint: Dengeki Comics NEXT
- Magazine: ComicWalker
- Original run: April 12, 2025 – present
- Volumes: 1
- icon

The 8th Son? Are You Kidding Me? (Japanese: 八男って､ それはないでしょう!, Hepburn: Hachinan tte, Sore wa Nai Deshō!) is a Japanese fantasy light novel series written by Y.A. and illustrated by Fuzichoco. It was serialized online between June 2013 and March 2017 on the user-generated novel publishing website Shōsetsuka ni Narō. It was acquired by Media Factory, who published the first light novel volume in April 2014 under their MF Books imprint. A manga adaptation with art by Hiroki Kusumoto has been serialized online via Kadokawa Shoten's ComicWalker website since 2015. An anime television series adaptation by Shin-Ei Animation aired from April 2 to June 18, 2020.

== Plot ==
Shingo Ichinomiya was once a single company worker until the day he fell asleep and woke up in a magical fantasy world as a little boy named Wendelin von Benno Baumeister, the eighth son of the noble Baumeister family. Due to his family being poor, Wendelin is unlikely to inherit anything from his father as the family's lord, wealth and possessions will go to his eldest brother Kurt while the rest of his brothers leave the succession to find income by other means. He looks through his father's library and finds a magic testing orb that glows with rainbow colors when he activates it, proving he has an ability to use magic. Alfred, a former court wizard turned restless undead, senses his presence and decides to secretly teach Wendelin everything he knows about magic. Thanks to Alfred, Wendelin becomes a skilled swordsman and mage, leading him to become a famous adventurer known throughout the kingdom. Although his talent could bring prosperity to his family, in his situation it only brought disaster.

== Characters ==
=== Main characters ===
Wendelin (ヴェンデリン, Venderin/Vell)
Voiced by: Takuma Terashima (drama CD), Junya Enoki (anime), Shizuka Ishigami (young, anime) (Japanese); Benjamin Diskin (English)
Wendelin von Benno Baumeister is the main protagonist of the series. He was once a salaryman named Shingo Ichinomiya (一宮 慎吾, Ichinomiya Shingo) until he is transported into a highly aristocratic and polygamic (for the nobles) fantasy world as the eighth son of Artur von Benno Baumeister. Wendelin is at first worried about his well being since he is unlikely to inherit anything from his family as the youngest and 8th son until he discovers he has magic and meets Alfred Reinford, a former court wizard turned undead spirit who teaches him how to use his magic and makes him a skilled mage. As the series progress, he forms an adventurer party with his former classmates and friends and becomes famous not only for his powerful magic but also for finding lost magical ruins and defeating powerful monsters, especially dragons. Eventually, he is rewarded for his accomplishments by the King of Helmut who grants him the rank of Earl (Count in the anime and the web novel, which is the same thing) and his own lands to rule. Wendelin eventually marries five of his female companions and later his former sister-in-law, students and lovers, including Margrave Bleichröder's legitimized daughter.
Elise (エリーゼ, Erīse)
Voiced by: Saori Hayami (drama CD), Asuka Nishi (anime) (Japanese); Reba Buhr (English)
Elise Katharina von Hohenheim, is a priestess and one of Wendelin's party members. Nicknamed the "Saint" by the people due to her kindness, healing powers, and is the granddaughter of the Cardinal of the kingdom's church. Her grandfather arranges a political marriage between Elise and Wendelin, hoping to secure an alliance between the upcoming popular noble and the church. Despite their arranged engagement, Elise genuinely falls in love with Wendelin as they both understand the burden of being in the spotlight. She later marries Wendelin as the head wife of their family.
Erwin (エルヴィン, Eruvin/El)
Voiced by: Showtaro Morikubo (drama CD), Hiro Shimono (anime) (Japanese); Billy Kametz (English)
Erwin von Alnim is a knight and one of Wendelin's party members. A classmate of Wendelin during their days in the academy, Erwin wishes to find fame and fortune for himself rather than rely on his noble family. After Wendelin becomes an Earl, Erwin pledges loyalty to his best friend as his first retainer and personal guard and later becomes engaged to one of his teammates, Haruka Fujibayashi, a citizen of the semi-independent country of the Count of Mizuho in the Holy Roman Empire.
Louise (ルイーゼ, Ruīze/Luise)
Voiced by: Asami Imai (drama CD), Yuuna Mimura (anime) (Japanese); Cherami Leigh (English)
Louise Yorande Aorelia Oufelbeik is a martial artist and one of Wendelin's party members. Skilled in channeling magic into physical combat, she became an adventurer after her family kicked her out for possessing excessive mana capacity. She fell in love with Wendelin but due to being a commoner, she at first believes she cannot legally marry him but be his mistress instead. She is also in competition with her best friend Iina, who is also in love with Wendelin. However, Wendelin reveals he loves them both and wants them both to be his wives instead. Thanks to the party's fame and service to the kingdom, the King raises Louise to the rank of nobility, allowing her to marry Wendelin as one of his wives.
Iina (イーナ, Īna/Ena)
Voiced by: Eriko Matsui (drama CD), Mikako Komatsu (anime) (Japanese); Erica Mendez (English)
Iina Suzane Hirenbrant is a spearwoman and one of Wendelin's party members. The daughter of a family of spear practitioners, she became an adventurer after her family forced her to leave after she defeated and humiliated her older brothers in spear combat. She fell in love with Wendelin since they were classmates but due to her family being vassals, she at first believes she cannot legally marry him but be his mistress instead. She is also in competition with her best friend Louise, who is also in love with Wendelin. However, Wendelin reveals he loves them both and would rather make them both his wives instead. Thanks to the party's fame and service to the kingdom, the King raises Iina to the rank of nobility, allowing her to marry Wendelin as one of his wives.
Wilma (ヴィルマ, Viruma/Vilma)
Voiced by: M.A.O (anime) (Japanese); Veronica Taylor (English)
Wilma Etol von Asgahan is an ax-wielding hunter and one of Wendelin's party members. She was formerly a hunter serving the Asgahan family until the head of the family, Lord Marshall Edgar Asgahan, adopted her as his daughter as part of his plan to protect Wendelin from jealous nobles by presenting her as a possible fiancé. Wilma was born with a rare condition called Hero's Syndrome, which multiplied her metabolism many times over but also constantly channels her mana into physical prowess many times more efficiently compared to other mages. Due to her condition, she became a hunter out of necessity to feed her high metabolism and agrees to her adopted father's plan since Wendelin, a famous monster hunter and rich noble, will allow her to eat various kinds of monster meat and other foods. She later also becomes one of Wendelin's wives.

=== Supporting characters ===
Alfred Reinford (アルフレッド, Arufureddo)
Voiced by: Daisuke Namikawa (anime) (Japanese); Kaiji Tang (English)
Alfred is a former court wizard and Wendelin's master. He was believed to have been killed during a failed campaign to exterminate dangerous monsters in the Enchanted Forest in the Baumeister domain. Still, he was revealed to have survived as a Whispering Dead, a sentient undead doomed to become a mindless zombie eventually. Sensing Wendelin's great potential, he made him his disciple and trained him for several weeks before peacefully passing away. Though their time together was short-lived he had the greatest impact on Wendelin's life. After Wendelin turned 12, he took Alfred's advice on how to make tuition to get into the adventure academy. Alfred's assets and wealth are later inherited by Wendelin as his successor.
Brantack Lyngstad (ブランターク・リングスタット, Burantāku Ringusutatto)
Voiced by: Yusaku Yara (anime) (Japanese); Patrick Seitz (English)
A retired adventurer and around 50 years old, Brantack is Alfred's former magic teacher and later mentor to Wendelin and his party. He is currently in the employ of Lord Bleichröder.
Klimt Kristoff von Armstrong (クリムト・クリストフ・フォン・アームストロング, Kurimuto Kurisutofu fon Āmusutorongu)
Voiced by: Masashi Yamane (anime) (Japanese); Matthew David Rudd (English)
The King's court wizard, proficient in physically enhancing magic, and Alfred Reinford's best friend. He later teaches Louise and Wendelin after the noble's tournament and becomes their guru. He is Elise's uncle.
Roderich (ローデリヒ, Rōderihi)
Voiced by: Tomohito Takatsuka (anime) (Japanese); Xander Mobus (English)
A former spearman warrior who serves Wendelin as his chamberlain. Roderich tried to get Wendelin to hire him as a retainer for years. Roderich comes from a merchant family and has numerous connections with merchants. He is the illegitimate son of the financial auditor, Baron Rückner. After the events with Kurt and the death of Rückner, Roderich declined to inherit the peerage from Rückner. He then transferred to the new Baumeister Earldom to become its governor. He acts as Wendelin's advisor. In the web novel, Roderich is referred to as a majordomo.
Amalie Mainbach (アマーリエ, Amārie)
Voiced by: Yukana (anime)
Amalie is Kurt's wife, the mother of his two sons, and Wendelin's sister-in-law. After Kurt's death, she begins a relationship with Wendelin and teaches him how to properly make love with his wives before their wedding. Later, both Amalie and Wendelin genuinely fall in love with each other and she becomes his mistress.
Cardinal Hohenheim (枢機卿ホーエンハイム, Sūkikyō Hōenhaimu)
Voiced by: Junpei Asashina
Leader of the kingdom's church and Elise's grandfather. He wanted Wendelin under his influence to increase the church's political power, so he tricked a still young and naïve Wendelin into agreeing to marry Elise, becoming Wendelin's grandfather-in-law.
Amadeus Freytag von Bleichröder
Voiced by: Hironori Kondou
The noble in charge of the southern part of the Kingdom of Helmut, which includes the lands of the Knight of Baumeister. In the anime, he is a Duke. In the web novel, he is a Margrave. His father was the leader of the troops, with Alfred Reinford as his wizard, who perished and became undead, while trying to subdue the Devil Forest.
Katharina
Katharina Linda von Waigel is a headstrong (former) noble with a competitive streak who has a strong belief in the traditions of the nobility. As such, she tends to be overly concerned with "keeping up appearances" per her perceived status. At some point before meeting Wendelin, she also became very hostile and provocative towards others, due to her always being singled out by those who wished to take advantage of her. This caused Wend to initially peg her as having a "loner" type personality. She is also easily embarrassed, to the point of stereo-typically crying into Elise's lap when Wendelin "accidentally" saw her naked, and turning beet-red when she proposed to him. She also becomes one of Wendelin's wives.
Therese Sigrid von Philip
A candidate for the emperor of the Holy Roman Empire, she is a very stubborn person who is well respected within her domain after going through various circumstances. She is also quite fond of Earl Baumeister to the point of openly flirting and teasing him in front of his wives. She genuinely ends up in love with Wendelin even though he rebukes her every time.

=== Baumeister Household ===
Kurt (クルト, Kuruto)
Voiced by: Tomokazu Sugita (anime) (Japanese); Chris Hackney (English)
Kurt Baumeister is Wendelin's eldest brother and heir to the Baumeister family. He is the least educated of all his brothers and is always paranoid about one of his brothers stealing his inheritance. Proud and arrogant of being the heir, he grows jealous of his youngest brother after Wendelin's fame as an adventurer grows. Due to his illiteracy, he is forced to rely heavily on his wife Amalie, and Klaus, the village chief. Wanting his brother's riches and assets, he joins a conspiracy with a group of nobles who are also jealous of Wendelin and want him assassinated (unaware Wendelin had submitted a will, and Kurt will get nothing but a bounty on his head). The conspiracy fails as Wendelin makes an offer to all of Kurt's accomplices, and is deceived into using a cursed flute to kill Wendelin, which kills Kurt in the process and Wendelin and Elise purify him. In his final moments, an entity that carries a fragment of his malice flies over to slaughter the one who had used him, Baron Rückner.
Artur von Benno Baumeister (アルトゥル・フォン・ベンノ・バウマイスター, Aruturu Fon Benno Baumaisutā)
Voiced by: Dai Matsumoto (Japanese); Kyle McCarley (English)
The current lord and Wendelin's father who rules a small farmland. He has eight sons from his wife Johanna and mistress Leila. His great-grandfather was a prince second-in-line of his household when he explored the territory had it to achieve the development of a portion of the monster-infested lands. He had a dark past towards women as he was known in the village as sleeping with married women and getting them pregnant. All this makes Wendelin unhappy and has a strained relationship with his father. Despite his poor education, Artur knew his eldest son Kurt was not suitable to be the next lord, but could not bring himself to deny Kurt the position as presumptive heir. When Kurt dies in an ill-fated attempt to assassinate Wendelin, Artur is forced to retire and officially passes the position to his second son Hermann.

== Media ==
=== Light novels ===
The 8th Son? Are You Kidding Me? novels are written by Y.A. and illustrated by Fuzichoco and published by Media Factory under its MF Books imprint. Thirty one volumes have been released as of November 2025.

==== Volumes ====
No.	Release date	ISBN
1	April 25, 2014	978-4-04-066719-5
2	July 25, 2014	978-4-04-066924-3
3	October 24, 2014	978-4-04-067133-8
4	January 23, 2015	978-4-04-067356-1
5	June 25, 2015	978-4-04-067696-8
6	September 25, 2015	978-4-04-067785-9
7	December 25, 2015	978-4-04-068020-0
8	April 25, 2016	978-4-04-068183-2
9	August 25, 2016	978-4-04-068461-1
10	February 25, 2017	978-4-04-069087-2
11	June 24, 2017	978-4-04-069274-6
12	December 25, 2017	978-4-04-069599-0
13	April 25, 2018	978-4-04-069868-7
14	August 25, 2018	978-4-04-065131-6
15	December 25, 2018	978-4-04-065389-1
16	March 25, 2019	978-4-04-065636-6
17	July 25, 2019	978-4-04-065907-7
18	December 25, 2019	978-4-04-064270-3
19	March 25, 2020	978-4-04-064539-1
20	July 20, 2020	978-4-04-064799-9
21	November 25, 2020	978-4-04-680010-7
22	April 24, 2021	978-4-04-680392-4
23	August 25, 2021	978-4-04-680694-9
24	December 24, 2021	978-4-04-680993-3
Recollection	February 25, 2022	—
25	April 25, 2022	978-4-04-681355-8
26	August 25, 2022	978-4-04-681654-2
27	December 23, 2022	978-4-04-682022-8
28	September 25, 2023	978-4-04-682891-0
29	May 24, 2024	978-4-04-683626-7
30	January 24, 2025	978-4-04-684462-0
31	November 25, 2025	978-4-04-685467-4
32	April 24, 2026	978-4-04-660083-7

==== Spin-off ====
A spin-off series, titled Hachinan tte, Sore wa Nai Deshou! Misokkasu (八男って、それはないでしょう！みそっかす; 'The 8th Son? Are You Kidding Me? You good-for-nothing!'), is written by Y.A. and illustrated by Fuzichoco. The novels have been published by Media Factory, under its MF Books imprint. Four volumes have been released as of November 2025. The series is set in the past, depicting the childhood and early years of the primary characters prior to the events of the main story.

No.	Release date	ISBN
1	May 25, 2023	978-4-04-682481-3
2	January 25, 2024	978-4-04-683148-4
3	September 25, 2024	978-4-04-684048-6
4	May 23, 2025	978-4-04-684811-6

=== Manga ===
A manga adaptation with art by Hiroki Kusumoto has been published online by Kadokawa Shoten's ComicWalker since 2015. As of October 2025, its chapters have been collected in fourteen tankōbon volumes.

A second manga adaptation illustrated by Vanillabou, titled The 8th Son? Are You Kidding Me?: The Story Begins (八男って、それはないでしょう！ ～はじまりの物語～, Hachinan tte, Sore wa Nai Deshō! Hajimari no Monogatari), was serialized online on Kadokawa Shoten's ComicWalker from December 19, 2019, to October 21, 2020. The story depicts Wendelin's childhood, which wasn't adapted in the first manga adaptation. The individual chapters were compiled into two tankōbon volumes.

==== Volumes ====
No.	Release date	ISBN
1	September 19, 2015	978-4-04-067796-5
2	March 22, 2016	978-4-04-068150-4
3	November 21, 2016	978-4-04-068664-6
4	June 22, 2017	978-4-04-069257-9
5	March 22, 2018	978-4-04-069696-6
6	January 21, 2019	978-4-04-065197-2
7	December 23, 2019	978-4-04-064207-9
8	April 23, 2020	978-4-04-064468-4
9	January 22, 2021	978-4-04-680049-7
10	September 21, 2021	978-4-04-680807-3
11	May 23, 2022	978-4-04-681386-2
12	January 23, 2023	978-4-04-682077-8
13	September 22, 2023	978-4-04-682810-1
14	May 23, 2024	978-4-04-683581-9
15	January 23, 2025	978-4-04-684389-0
16	October 23, 2025	978-4-04-685193-2

==== Hachinan tte, Sore wa Nai Deshō! Hajimari no Monogatari ====
No.	Release date	ISBN
1	March 23, 2020	978-4-04-064474-5
2	November 21, 2020	978-4-04-064755-5

==== Spin-off ====
A manga adaptation of the spin-off light novels illustrated by Magawo, titled The 8th Son? Are You Kidding Me? You Good-For-Nothing! -Episode.Elise- (八男って、それはないでしょう！ みそっかす -episode.エリーゼ-, Hachinan tte, Sore wa Nai Deshou! Misokkasu -Episode.Erīze-), began serialization on Kadokawa's ComicWalker website on April 12, 2025. The individual chapters have been collected into a single tankōbon volume as of November 2025.

No.	Release date	ISBN
1	November 27, 2025	978-4-04-916816-7
2	June 26, 2026	978-4-04-952277-8

=== Anime ===
An anime adaptation of the series was announced by Media Factory on December 14, 2018. The anime was later confirmed to be a television series, which aired from April 2 to June 18, 2020, on Tokyo MX, BS11, and AT-X. The series is animated by Shin-Ei Animation, with assistance by SynergySP, and is directed by Tatsuo Miura, featuring series composition by Takeshi Miyamoto and character designs by Keiji Tanabe. Minako Sato is composing the series' music. The opening theme is "Jikū no Mayoi Hito" (時空の迷い人; "Space-Time of the Hesitant Person") performed by Demon Kakka and Arika Takarano, while the ending theme is "Tsukiakari Monologue" (月明りのMonologue; "Moonlight Monologue") performed by Akino Arai × AKINO from Bless4.

No.	Title (Note: All English titles are taken from Crunchyroll.)	Original release date
1	"The 8th Son? Are You Kidding Me?"; Transliteration: "Hachi-nan tte, Sore wa Nai Deshō!" (Japanese: 八男って､ それはないでしょう!)	April 2, 2020
A Japanese salaryman falls asleep before waking up and finding himself in the body of a five-year-old noble boy named Wendelin von Benno Baumeister, during the wedding of his oldest brother Kurt and his wife Amalie. Despite being nobles, Wendelin discovers the Baumeisters are poor and only own a small knight dom of farmlands which will be inherited by Kurt while the rest of his six older brothers have either married into other families or found work as government officials or soldiers, leaving him nothing to inherit. After finding a book on magic in his father's library, Wendelin later discovers he has the ability to use magic. While searching for firewood in the nearby Enchanted Forest for his family, Wendelin meets a sorcerer named Alfred Reinford, who detected the boy's magic, saving him from a wild boar and vows to teach him how to use magic.
2	"A Succession Dispute? Are You Kidding Me?"; Transliteration: "Oie Sōdō tte, Sore wa Nai Deshō!" (Japanese: お家騒動って､ それはないでしょう!)	April 9, 2020
Wendelin decides to keep his magic secret after learning it would move him ahead of Kurt to inherit the lordship, risking possible assassination by Kurt. Alfred discovers Wendelin has an extraordinarily high magic capacity. As the training continues, Alfred displays unusual symptoms: cold skin, no sense of taste, and bouts of pain. Wendelin's strange behavior draws Kurt's attention until Wendelin announces he wants to be an adventurer, making Kurt less suspicious. The kingdom's Adventurers Academy is expensive, so Wendelin decides to work to pay his own tuition. To help with traveling, Alfred teaches Wendelin flight magic. Wendelin's father hears a rumor of a Whispering Dead nearby, a sentient corpse doomed to become a mindless zombie. Wendelin realizes that he means Alfred and confronts him. Alfred admits he is dead due to a failed expedition but came back as a Whispering Dead to pass on his knowledge to an apprentice. Having done so, he teaches Wendelin holy magic to purge him and let him pass to the afterlife. Seven years later, Wendelin leaves his family to become an adventurer.
3	"A Loner? Are You Kidding Me?"; Transliteration: "Botchi tte, Sore wa Nai Deshō!" (Japanese: ボッチって､ それはないでしょう!)	April 16, 2020
At Adventurers Academy, Wendelin tries to make friends but due to his lack of communications skills, high level of magic, and incredible actions, the rest of the students are too afraid to approach him. Three students, Erwin, Louise, and Iina, share a bond over being the youngest children of lower-class families. Wanting to gain Wendelin's recognition to form a party with him, they attempt to hunt a large pack of wolves but are overwhelmed until Wendelin rescues them. Due to a misunderstanding, the three believe Wendelin sees them as a burden when in reality he wants to be friends with them. Their class attends a party hosted by Duke Bleichroder who takes an interest in Wendelin as Wendelin's father is a vassal of Bleichroder. Wendelin asks Erwin, Louise, and Iina to join him much to their surprise. They learn Bleichroder brought them to meet his court wizard, Brantack Lyngstad, Alfred's former teacher, who confirms his suspicions that Alfred passed his knowledge to Wendelin. Realizing that Wendelin is the same as them, Erwin, Louise, and Iina agree to be Wendelin's friends and form an adventuring party. For returning Alfred's possessions and the expedition's resources to Bleichroder, Wendelin is rewarded a thousand gold coins and inherits Alfred's estate much to everyone's surprise.
4	"Obligations? Are You Kidding Me?"; Transliteration: "Shigarami tte, Sore wa Nai Deshō!" (Japanese: しがらみって､ それはないでしょう!)	April 23, 2020
Wendelin and his friends are invited to his brother Erich's wedding in the kingdom's capital. An undead bone dragon attacks their airship so Brantack has Wendelin purge the dragon with holy magic before collecting the valuable bones and crystal heart. In the capital city of Stuttburg, Brantack leaves them with his merchant friend Aruterio Marchen. Soldiers take Wendelin to meet the king, who rewards him for defeating the bone dragon with the Twin Dragon medal and the noble rank of Baronet, making Wendelin one of the nobles of the robe. Erich worries as their father is only a knight, meaning Wendelin will be removed from their family tree to become head of his own noble family. Several officials begin arguing how much to pay Wendelin for the bones and heart. Aruterio explains that Cardinal Hohenheim wants Wendelin under the church's influence, Lord Marshall Edgar wants him for the military, and Lord Commissioner Ruckner wants to save money. In the end, Wendelin is paid 150,000 gold. Wendelin attends Erich's wedding but finds his family is so poor they cannot provide a suitable wedding present, embarrassing themselves and their lord, Duke Bleichroder, so Wendelin buys the presents. Aruterio manages to find Wendelin the kome-kouji he had been looking for to make miso, which he uses to make dinner for his family and friends. Cardinal Hohenheim informs his granddaughter, "Saint" Elise Hohenheim, he has found her a suitable husband.
5	"Political Marriage? Are You Kidding Me?"; Transliteration: "Seiryaku Kekkon tte, Sore wa Nai Deshō!" (Japanese: 政略結婚って､ それはないでしょう!)	April 30, 2020
Hohenheim introduces Wendelin to Elise then, due to his naiveté, tricks Wendelin into forming a political marriage with Elise. Wendelin panics at the idea of marrying a woman he doesn't love but is later assured by Erich that nobles rarely meet their betrothed until the wedding. As he is swarmed by unemployed adventurers every time he leaves his home, he hires a grateful Erwin as his retainer. Wendelin sneaks into Hohenheim's estate to talk to Elise and is relieved that she is at least not against marrying him. When Louise and Lina find Erwin is Wendelin's retainer they decide to outdo him by becoming Wendelin's mistresses after he marries Elise. Wendelin is invited to dinner with Elise where the butler suggests Wendelin provide Elise an engagement ring. Wendelin takes Elise shopping, but rather than a showy ring Wendelin purchases a much plainer ring that suits Elise better, learning afterward it is made from a magic storing crystal, making it perfect for Elise's healing magic. Wendelin tells her he is worried about living up to his dragon-slaying reputation when he is still unsure of himself. Elise begins to develop a crush on him. The butler reports to Hohenheim that Wendelin is an unusual noble and he has no idea what his thoughts are. Meanwhile, it is shown the only thing on Wendelin's mind is how much he misses Japanese soy sauce.
6	"A Bullet Tour? Are You Kidding Me?"; Transliteration: "Dangan Deba tte, Sore wa Nai Deshō!" (Japanese: 弾丸出張って､ それはないでしょう!)	May 7, 2020
Elize visits Louise, Lina, and Erwin to learn exactly what sort of man Wendelin is, while The King asks Wendelin and Brantack to slay an ancient dragon, Greigorland, as the kingdom needs his territory for farmland. He also sends Klimt Kristoff von Armstrong, his enthusiastic and brawny court wizard. Meanwhile, as the death of Greigorland could cause nearby monsters to grow bolder, Erwin, Louise, and Lina hire the unemployed adventurers to help guard the area with Elise and the Church's clergy as their healers. Wendelin and Armstrong defeat Greigorland and Wendelin collect the valuable body. Sensing Greigorland's death, the monsters attack the soldiers, forcing Wendelin and his friends to join the battle. Elize, knowing Wendelin considers himself cowardly but joins the battle anyway, is relieved he is a truly good man and finally passes out from exhaustion after he returns safely. Wendelin looks after her until she awakens, only to learn Armstrong is her uncle. The next day Elise asks if Louise and Lina are also his fiancés since they all live in the same house, which Wendelin is surprised to learn she does not mind if he has concubines. Both Louise and Lina announce they want to be his concubines and with Elise's support, Wendelin nervously agrees. Note, Wedndolin is referred to as "Baron" when he is facing the dragon, indicating he has earned a promotion.
7	"No Magic? Are You Kidding Me?"; Transliteration: "Mahō Kinshi tte, Sore wa Nai Deshō!" (Japanese: 魔法禁止って､ それはないでしょう!)	May 14, 2020
At the wedding of his brother, Helmut, Wendelin learns he is expected to participate in a martial arts tournament, but as a noble, he must use a sword instead of magic. Louise and Lina decide to participate as well. Erwin is convinced to participate by Brantack. Wendelin obtains permission from Hohenheim to add Elize to their party. Erwin decides he wants to become champion, until realizing the previous champion, Warren, Commander of the Royal Knights, is participating again and snaps at Louise and Lina due to his bitterness of having no magic. The next day he learns Elise has also been training, believing her lack of physical ability makes her a hindrance. Realizing everyone has some weaknesses, Erwin apologizes. During the preliminary matches, Wendelin faces Warren and loses instantly. Louise is defeated in the semi-finals. Lina goes up against Roderich, an annoyingly stubborn spear user obsessed with being hired by Wendelin, and loses against him. Erwin must face Warren and worries if he loses Wendelin will remove him from their party, so Louise shows him an inspirational lunch Wendelin made, proving Wendelin values him for more than his fighting skills. Though it is implied Erwin lost against Warren, Warren agrees to become Erwin's trainer until he reaches 15 and becomes a full-time adventurer. Lina also finds a spear trainer while Louise introduces Wendelin to her martial arts trainer, Armstrong, who offers to train them until they reach 15.
8	"Presumed Dead? Are You Kidding Me?"; Transliteration: "Shibōsetsu tte, Sore wa Nai Deshō!" (Japanese: 死亡説って、それはないでしょう！)	May 21, 2020
Three years later Kurt, Wendelin's eldest brother, receives a letter from Baron Rückner, Lord Commissioner Rückner's brother, that Wendelin has died. Five days previously, Wendelin finally turns 15 and registers their adventurer party as the Dragon Busters, so the King sends them to investigate ancient ruins. Brantack explains the ruins were discovered in Greigorland's territory and many high-ranking adventurers have disappeared. Upon entering they accidentally activate a magic circle that transports them to the bottom floor, meaning they must fight their way to the surface past an army of golems. Five days later Head Auditor Ruckner spreads rumors Wendelin has died and as part of his plot to replace his brother as Lord Commissioner, he suggests Kurt's sons inherit Wendelin's title of Baron. Still unsure how far they have to climb Elise tells Wendelin she hopes they survive or she will regret not having married him. They encounter a dragon golem with Mythril scales. Brantack runs out of magic and collapses so Elise grants Wendelin the spell Miracle's Light through a kiss and Wendelin defeats the dragon. Brantack learns the ruins were built by the ancient mage Count Ichelberg, famous for his work creating magic items. They also discover a vast library and a hangar filled with priceless ancient airships. Erwin opens the hangar doors showing they have made it to the surface.
9	"People Hate Me? Are You Kidding Me?"; Transliteration: "Kirawaresha tte, Sore wa Nai Deshō!" (Japanese: 嫌われ者って、それはないでしょう！)	May 28, 2020
For the ruins' treasures the King pays the Dragon Busters ten million gold. Wendelin decides to move their home to Breichburg to set up their adventuring careers but Armstrong reveals the rumors about Wendelin's death, causing him to realize their success has attracted enemies. Baron Rückner and his allies begin planning Wendelin's assassination. Wendelin hires Roderich as his butler to handle the estate in the capital while a pink-haired girl named Wilma begins following Wendelin. Wendelin meets the Magic Guild's leader, Lucas Gotz Beckenbauer, and borrows an artifact that summons any item. Wendelin throws a party for his friends and family, and important nobles and serves them his summoned tuna sushi with soy sauce. Roderich tells Wendelin about Rückner, including his attempt to include Kurt in his plot, but assures Wendelin he has arranged for Ruckner to be summoned by the King for questioning while also admitting he is Rückner's illegitimate son but hates him for his cruelty. Wilma bursts into the party for the tuna and Lord Marshall Edgar reveals Wilma is his adopted daughter and she suffers from Hero Syndrome which, according to Brantack, constantly overpowers her muscles, resulting in a vast appetite. Edgar offers Wendelin Wilma as a bodyguard or even a wife if he wants. Duke Bleichroder asks Wendelin to take on job-hunting monsters. Meanwhile, Kurt receives the fake news about Wendelin's death and laughs with joy at inheriting Wendelin's wealth, only for Wendelin and all his friends to teleport outside, revealing Wendelin's survival.
10	"Toxic? Are You Kidding Me?"; Transliteration: "Kurēmā tte, Sore wa Nai Deshō!" (Japanese: クレーマーって、それはないでしょう！)	June 4, 2020
Brantack explains to Wendelin's father, Sir Artur, that the deceased expedition army, which Alfred Reinford was part of, are now zombies. As the zombies are on their land, Artur is entitled to 30% of any profit gained from the zombies' materials, but Kurt greedily demands 50% and tries to insist the zombies and their belongings be left in the forest instead of being given proper funerals. Wendelin realizes Kurt's animosity and jealousy towards his success and is hated by the servants and villagers, who would prefer Wendelin inherit the lordship. Wendelin and his friends purify the zombies, including Duke Bleichroder's father and even the lich grandfather of Marlene, the wife of Wendelin's brother Herrman. Wendelin assures Marlene her grandfather had a happy life so she gratefully allows Elise to purify him. Wendelin returns the armor of the villager's relatives to them for funerals but then Kurt demands the armor be melted down and reused. Wendelin provides new iron so the villagers can keep the armor, though this only angers Kurt. Duke Bleichroder surprises Wendelin by insisting he stay with his family for a while, though it is clear he is plotting something. Wendelin attends the soldier's funerals whereas Kurt insults the villagers by remaining absent. Klaus, the village chief, secretly asks Wendelin to replace Kurt, and Brantack agrees, pointing out that through Bleichroder's insistence Wendelin stays with his family, the entire royal court, including the King, implicitly want Wendelin to replace Kurt.
11	"Between a Rock and a Hard Place? Are You Kidding Me?"; Transliteration: "Itabasami tte, Sore wa Nai Deshō!" (Japanese: 板挟みって、それはないでしょう！)	June 11, 2020
Brantack explains the King wants to develop the surrounding land but is unable due to the current land owning and low ranking lords, like Sir Artur. Instead, the royal court has been secretly driving Kurt mad with jealousy over Wendelin, so that when he snaps he will be removed as heir. Wendelin refuses to participate as it would also mean disinheriting his nephews. Klaus warns Brantack to be wary of Amalie, Kurt's wife, who will try to protect her sons at all costs. Wendelin learns Kurt will be assassinated after Wendelin becomes lord to prevent him from causing trouble in the future. Wendelin tries to offer Kurt a proposal that would allow Kurt to become lord while allowing Wendelin to develop the land but Kurt is blinded by jealousy and refuses. With no other option, Wendelin decides to become lord, though warns his friends he is planning to resist the royal court by making sure that no one dies as a result. Wendelin opens a bazaar to provide the villagers with better resources and then bribes Kurt's shop-owning allies with advanced training in their various crafts to improve their businesses, breaking their reliance on Kurt. He also buys a house in the capital for Amalie and his nephews to keep them safe and hopes to have Kurt banished to a monastery by Cardinal Hohenheim so the court will have no reason to assassinate him. With no allies left Kurt finally goes mad and plans to kill Wendelin. One of Baron Rückner's men provides Kurt with a magical weapon called the Dragon's Flute.
12	"The 8th Son? I Guess That's Not So Bad!"; Transliteration: "Hachi-nan tte, Sore mo Ari Deshō!" (Japanese: 八男って、それもありでしょう！)	June 18, 2020
With the magical Dragon's Flute that will summon a horde of dragons, Kurt lures Wendelin and company to an empty clearing in a forest in the undeveloped land. Kurt, after mocking Wendelin and Brantack's failed attempt to stop him, plays the flute to kill the party and punish the entire region, including his own family, for betraying him. It quickly becomes apparent to the companions the flute is not summoning a horde of dragons, but instead channeling all the malice of the land into Kurt, turning him into a massive undead. Initially shocked by the thought of killing his brother, Wendelin reluctantly helps Elise purify Kurt. With his body's destruction, the small remaining piece of Kurt's malice searches for the nobles who were responsible for his death and kills them and their families, including Baron Rückner. Having completed the kingdom's quest to fix the troubled lands, the king saddles Wendelin with developing the land and offers Wendelin a reward. Wendelin, having grown fed up with nobles using him without consequences, takes a chance to rob them by asking for 2 of the 12 titles that were vacated with the deaths caused by Kurt's malice. After a short argument between the officials of who should get the titles and who's right, it is to bestow titles, the King allows Wendelin to bestow two titles to whom he chooses and even raises his rank to Count, the fifth rank of the kingdom (bypassing the rank of Viscount). Returning to the land he informs Amalie that when his nephews come of age, he will bestow to each of them the titles should they need them. She in turn lets Wendelin know that the boys will come to realize that Kurt's death was of his own choosing and not Wendelin's fault. Eventually, the development of the southern land begins with Wendelin being overworked by his party, and yet still enjoying his new life with them.

== See also ==
- I Lost My Adventurer's License, but It's Fine Because I Have an Adorable Daughter Now, another light novel series illustrated by Fuzichoco
- She Professed Herself Pupil of the Wise Man, another light novel series illustrated by Fuzichoco
