= Haikyu!! season 2 =

Second season of Haikyu!! anime television series

Haikyu!!
- Season 2
- Cover of the second season DVD released by Sentai Filmworks
- No. of episodes: 25

Release
- Original network: MBS
- Original release: October 4, 2015 – March 27, 2016

Season chronology
- ← Previous; Season 1 Next → Season 3

The second season of Haikyu!! anime television series is produced by Production I.G. and directed by Susumu Mitsunaka, with Taku Kishimoto handling series composition, Takahiro Kishida providing character designs, and Yuki Hayashi and Asami Tachibana composed the music. The season was announced to be in production on December 19, 2014. It adapted the "Tokyo Expedition" (chapters 72–96) and the first half of "Spring High Preliminary" (chapters 97–149) story arcs from the original manga series of the same name written by Haruichi Furudate. The season aired from October 4, 2015, to March 27, 2016.

The series uses four pieces of theme music: two opening themes and two ending themes. From episodes 1 through 13, the opening theme song is "I'm a Believer" by Spyair, while the ending theme song is "Climber" by Galileo Galilei. From episodes 14 through 25, the opening theme song is "Fly High" by Burnout Syndromes, while the ending theme song is "Hatsunetsu (Fever)" (発熱 – はつねつ) by Tacica.

== Episodes ==
No. overall	No. in season	Title	Directed by	Written by	Original release date
26	1	"Let's Go to Tokyo!"; Transliteration: "Rettsu gō Tōkyō!!" (Japanese: レッツゴートーキョー!!)	Susumu Mitsunaka	Taku Kishimoto	October 4, 2015
Following their defeat to Aoba Johsai in the Inter-High Preliminaries, Karasuno is hard at work with practicing. Ittetsu Takeda, faculty advisor of Karasuno's volleyball club, arrives with encouraging news: Karasuno has been invited by Nekoma to take part in their training camp along with Fukurodani Academy, Shinzen and Ubugawa High's teams. Kageyama and Hinata unknowingly separate from the team during a run and run into Ushijima, captain of Shiratorizawa Academy's team. Avowing that the only good player in the Miyagi prefecture is Oikawa, Ushijima is challenged by Hinata.
27	2	"Direct Sunlight"; Transliteration: "Chokusha nikkō" (Japanese: 直射日光)	Yoshitaka Koyama	Susumu Mitsunaka	October 11, 2015
Hinata, Kageyama, Nishinoya, and Tanaka dread not being able to go to Tokyo to play if they do not pass their final exams. Nishinoya and Tanaka study at the latter's place. Hinata and Kageyama, however, have troubles with studying with Tsukishima, who proves to be of no help as a tutor. Hitoka Yachi, a first-year student Shimizu is trying to draft as the club's new manager, becomes their tutor.
28	3	"'Townsperson B'"; Transliteration: ""Murabito B"" (Japanese: "村人B")	Shintarō Nakazawa	Susumu Mitsunaka	October 18, 2015
Yachi is unsure of joining the volleyball club, but after watching their practice match against Ogi Nishi High, she starts to see its appeal. However, she struggles to tell her mother about joining, fearing disapproval. She begins to worry that she may not be of much use and recalls a time in junior high where she played a tree in a play. Hinata is able to convince her to join, recalling a time when he too played a background role as "Townsperson B". Yachi's mother approves of her new activity.
29	4	"'Center Ace'"; Transliteration: ""Sentā ēsu"" (Japanese: "センターエース")	Mariko Ishikawa	Taku Kishimoto	October 25, 2015
The team travels to Tokyo without Hinata and Kageyama, who are left behind to write their supplementary exams. Karasuno suffers many losses in their absence and are forced to do nine consecutive penalty laps of diving drills. Hinata and Kageyama finish their exams and arrive in Tokyo on time with the help of Tanaka's sister Saeko Tanaka. Karasuno wins their first match on the day; however, Shinzen is able to predict Hinata's quick attacks, much to his annoyance. Hinata later meets Lev Haiba, an imposing half-Russian player in Nekoma's team, who vows to be the first to counter his quick attack.
30	5	"'Greed'"; Transliteration: ""Yoku"" (Japanese: 『欲』)	Tomoko Hiramuki; Tetsuaki Watanabe	Taku Kishimoto	November 1, 2015
Hinata wishes to try out new techniques to be able to compete by himself, though Kageyama argues that in doing so he would break the team apart. Hinata deems him as unsupportive, leading into a heated argument between the two. The rest of the team worries that this will bring down their play and hope the two reconcile soon.
31	6	"'Tempo'"; Transliteration: ""Tenpo"" (Japanese: "テンポ")	Hirotaka Mori	Taku Kishimoto	November 8, 2015
Kageyama seeks out Oikawa for advice concerning Hinata's wishes to try new techniques. Coach Ukai introduces Hinata to his grandfather, former coach of Karasuno's team, to help him improve his offense. The two first-years are made aware that Hinata has absolute leadership in offensive attacks; Kageyama practices different tosses, while Hinata tries out other methods of quicks.
32	7	"Moonrise"; Transliteration: "Tsukinode" (Japanese: 月の出)	Shintarō Itoga	Taku Kishimoto	November 15, 2015
Karasuno arrives at Shinzen High's campus for the training camp. During a practice match against Fukurodani, Hinata notices that Kageyama has changed up his tosses. Asahi has also started working on jump serves, Nishinoya practices jump tosses, and Daichi, Tanaka, and Sugawara attempt synchronized attacks. The other teams recognize their efforts in trying out new plays.
33	8	"Illusionary Hero"; Transliteration: "Genkaku hīrō" (Japanese: 幻覚ヒーロー)	Masako Satō	Taku Kishimoto	November 22, 2015
Tsukishima believes that he shouldn't put so much effort in training like his brother did to avoid disappointment when faced with failure. Despite practicing very hard, Akiteru failed to become a regular player for Karasuno due to the number of more talented players on the team, including Hinata's idol, the "Little Giant."
34	9	"Vs. 'Umbrella'"; Transliteration: "VS "Kasa"" (Japanese: VS"傘")	Shintarō Itoga	Taku Kishimoto	November 29, 2015
Karasuno is up against Nekoma in a practice match, and Hinata recognises that Kageyama had subconsciously tossed the ball the way he used to when Hinata's eyes were closed. The middle blocker points this out, so Kageyama decides to practice on his own in order to give Hinata the exact tosses he wants. This causes Hinata to be free to join Tsukishima's practices with Tetsurō Kuroo, Keiji Akaashi and Kōtarō Bokuto, exceptionally skilled players from Fukurodani. Lev joins in, and their 3-on-3 match gives Hinata the chance to learn new moves he could use against future opponents.
35	10	"Gears"; Transliteration: "Haguruma" (Japanese: 歯車)	Shintarō Nakazawa	Taku Kishimoto	December 6, 2015
For the last practice match of the training camp, Karasuno is against Fukurodani again. This time, they have somewhat polished their moves to the point where they are able to gain points and become neck-to-neck in the scores. Takeda likens their mastering of the new skills and executing them to gain points as cogs working together. Their ability to have improved so much in a week and catch up with their team in terms of points causes their ace, Bokuto to fall in a dejected mode.
36	11	"'Above'"; Transliteration: ""Ue"" (Japanese: "上")	Tetsuaki Watanabe	Taku Kishimoto	December 13, 2015
With Bokuto in his dejected mode, Karasuno learns from first-hand experience why Fukurodani has one of the top volleyball teams in Tokyo. Fukurodani ends up winning the match, with Bokuto scoring the final point. The training camp comes to an end with a barbecue for the players. Karasuno returns to school to continue practising and honing in their skills, and other volleyball teams of the prefecture are busy practising for the Spring Tournament.
37	12	"Let the Games Begin!"; Transliteration: "Shiai Kaishi" (Japanese: 試合開始!!)	Itsurō Kawasaki	Takuya Satō	December 20, 2015
Karasuno's first opponents are Ougiminami High, one of the teams Shiratorizawa had defeated in the Inter-High Preliminaries. Former Coach Ukai comes along to watch Karasuno play, and the general public comment on how much Karasuno has changed from the rumours. Hinata bumps into Yoshiki Towada in the bathrooms, and vows that Karasuno would beat their team and their future opponents in order to make it into the nationals. Karasuno wins the match after Hinata's spike, and Ohgiminami are reflecting on their loss when the previous captain Noboru Akimiya approaches and praises them for giving their all in the end. As he leaves, Towada bows and thanks Akimiya for all he had done for them.
38	13	"Simple And Pure Strength"; Transliteration: "Shinpuru de junsui na chikara" (Japanese: シンプルで純粋な力)	Yūsuke Sunouchi	Takuya Satō	December 27, 2015
Karasuno's next opponent is Kakugawa, a volleyball team that has a player who is 201cm tall. Former Coach Ukai comes to watch the match, and Karasuno tries their best to work around the height advantage their opponent has. As he cannot perform the minus tempo attack, Yudai Hyakuzawa believes that he has Hinata cornered. But he and everyone else are quickly proven wrong when Hinata executes the block out against Hyakuzawa's hand and the ball is sent out of bounce, eventually winning the match for Karasuno. After their win, Karasuno bumps into Johzenji, who is fated to be their next opponent.
39	14	"Still Growing"; Transliteration: "Sodachizagari" (Japanese: 育ち盛り)	Kōji Komurakata	Taku Kishimoto	January 10, 2016
After the match, Karasuno reflects on their performance and seeks areas they could improve on. Tsukishima seeks help from his brother and coach on learning how to block spikers whom are taller and stronger than him. Kageyama spies on Aoba Johsai and is astonished by Oikawa's skills as a setter. Karasuno goes back to Kanto and practice perfecting their new skills, showing their opponents how much they had improved since the last training camp. They arrive back in time for the match against Johzenji.
40	15	"A Place To Play"; Transliteration: "Asobiba" (Japanese: アソビバ)	Tetsuaki Watanabe	Taku Kishimoto	January 17, 2016
Karasuno arrives at the stadium to play their game against Johzenji. The game begins with Johzenji's first point scored by Yuji Terushima, much to Karasuno's shock of the unconventional play style. As the game continues to play, Kageyama suffered nosebleed after the ball getting directly hit on the face in a successful attempt to block Futumata's spike, forcing Sugawara to replace him. At the end of first set, Johzenji tries to make their own synchronized attack but Terushima misses, causing the ball to fall on their side. Karasuno wins the first set, but expect the next set to be harder because the Johzenji team takes many risks and are unpredictable. Once the second set begins, Hinata and Kageyama successfully carry out another quick attack after a mishit in which Daichi knows what happened, and eventually saves the ball. As the set is about to resume, Hinata notices a change in the behavior of the Johzenji team.
41	16	"Next"; Transliteration: "Tsugi e" (Japanese: 次へ)	Shintarō Itoga	Taku Kishimoto	January 24, 2016
Johzenji makes a spirited comeback after a stern talk by their manager Hana Misaki, but comes up short, as Terushima's attempt to copy Karasuno's synchronized attack goes out of bounds. The play costs them the match, after which Hana, a third-year, retires as manager. As Hana begins to leave, the team bows and thank her for all she has done for them. Karasuno's next opponent is Wakutani South, a team whose captain has skills similar to those of the Little Giant, as noted by Coach Ukai. During the match, Karasuno suffers a blow as Daichi who tried to get the last hit of the ball, rendered unconscious after the ball went over the net and lands on the opposite side where Takeru just misses saving it.
42	17	"The Battle Without Will Power"; Transliteration: "Konjou nashi no Tatakai" (Japanese: 根性無しの戦い)	Yūsuke Kaneda	Taku Kishimoto	January 31, 2016
With Daichi injured, Ennoshita takes the captain's spot in the game. He tries to assure himself that this is just like the practice games but is unable to believe his own assurance and right away becomes nervous at the thought of trying to measure up to Daichi. Ennoshita reflects on how he had abandoned the volleyball club when he was a first-year, and decides that he would not run away from this match. Yamaguchi is subbed in as an ace server, and he is able to get one float serve past the net.
43	18	"The Losers"; Transliteration: "Haibokusha-tachi" (Japanese: 敗北者達)	Takashi Andō	Taku Kishimoto	February 7, 2016
As Aoba Johsai's match against Date Tech starts, Karasuno's match against Wakutani continues. Despite the weakened defence with Daichi's absence, Ennoshita finds a way for the team to continue scoring. Hinata incorporates the new moves he learnt during the Tokyo training camps, and Karasuno is able to gain victory against Wakutani.
44	19	"The Iron Wall Can Be Built Again and Again"; Transliteration: "Teppeki wa Nando demo Kizukareru" (Japanese: 鉄壁は何度でも築かれる)	Masako Satō	Taku Kishimoto	February 14, 2016
Date Tech is up against Aoba Johsai. Karasuno observes from the stands, and sees the new setter, the tall but inexperienced Koganegawa, on the court along with the remaining members of the team they played against last time. His height makes the match intense, but due to his lack of experience in blocking as part of the trademark iron wall, Aoba Jōsai is able to gain victory with their ace's strong spike earning them the winning point.
45	20	"Wiping Out"; Transliteration: "Fusshoku" (Japanese: 払拭)	Shintarō Nakazawa	Taku Kishimoto	February 21, 2016
Aoba Jōsai starts the match with Oikawa's serve, and team is able to recognise that Karasuno have improved immensely as a team. Despite Hinata and Kageyama's new quick having been altered slightly, the Seijoh third-years are able to think of a tactic to narrow its path to one they can handle more effectively. Karasuno pulls ahead in the first set, but a new player from Seijoh is subbed in and completely changes the rhythm of the game.
46	21	"The Destroyer"; Transliteration: "Kowashi-ya" (Japanese: 壊し屋)	Shintarō Itoga	Taku Kishimoto	February 28, 2016
Karasuno recognises that Kyōtani is a double-edged sword in the match: he makes just as many mistakes as he does attacks, and if Aoba Johsai does not use him successfully, his presence in the game can backfire their intentions to increase their offensive power. Sugawara is subbed into the game to help Karasuno gain more points, but is soon switched back out when the formation changes. Coach Ukai considers bringing Yamaguchi in as a pinch server to win the second set from Aoba Johsai.
47	22	"The Former Coward's Fight"; Transliteration: "Moto okubyōmono no tatakai" (Japanese: 元・根性無しの戦い)	Yūsuke Kaneda	Taku Kishimoto	March 6, 2016
Yamaguchi is subbed in as the pinch server and his serves are able to gain Karasuno more points. The gap between the two teams have shrunk, but Oikawa's strong serves win Aoba Johsai the second set. As the teams are switching sides, Yamaguchi marvels how amazing Oikawa's serves are and Hinata compliments that his are amazing as well. Ryuunosuke and Nishinoya approach and compliment Yamaguchi on his serves. Though grateful, Yamaguchi feels that only half of his serves were good. Ryuunosuke states that they should then celebrate the ones he felt were good and he should save his concerns for later. Now they have to get to the third set to determine the winners.
48	23	"'Team'"; Transliteration: ""Chīmu"" (Japanese: "チーム")	Tetsuaki Watanabe	Taku Kishimoto	March 13, 2016
The two teams are battling to win the third set, and Kyōtani's efforts are starting to become more reckless. He gets switched off, and has to calm down in order to play again. With the help of Yahaba, he does get back on to continue scoring points against Karasuno, and is finally able to play with Aoba Johsai as a teammate. Daichi manages to receive the serve, but it flies over to Seijoh's side. Kindaichi reflects back to the practices he had with Oikawa. They perform the sharp wipe successfully in the match, and Kageyama notes that Kindaichi's movements are different from the Interhigh. To counteract this, Kageyama and Hinata execute their quick, but it is too close to the net; however, Hinata is able to hit the ball directly down to gain a point for the team.
49	24	"The Absolute Limit Switch"; Transliteration: "Kyokugen suitchi" (Japanese: 極限スイッチ)	Susumu Mitsunaka	Taku Kishimoto	March 20, 2016
It is the last set, and Karasuno is in the lead. Aoba Johsai and Karasuno try their hardest to win, with the thought that the strongest six would be the ones who claim victory. But Karasuno triumphs, as they win the match with Kageyama and Hinata's quick spike. Oikawa reflects that it is impossible for someone with no natural talent to beat any volleyball genius, no matter how much he trains, strategize or who his teammates are, but he will continue on the path ahead of him with everything he's got.
50	25	"Declaration of War"; Transliteration: "Sensen fukoku" (Japanese: 宣戦布告)	Yumi Kamakura	Taku Kishimoto	March 27, 2016
Karasuno are through to the finals to determine the Miyagi representative for the Spring High Tournament. Aoba Johsai lament on their loss, but vow to beat Karasuno the following year. Oikawa bumps into Ushijima, in which the latter tells him that he had chosen the wrong path, but the former tells him that there is no one team that can guarantee victory. Later on, Ushijima approaches Karasuno at the entrance of the gymnasium, and Hinata and Kageyama vow to beat Shiratorizawa to make it to the nationals.
