= Yū Hayashi =

Japanese voice actor (born 1983)

- 林 勇
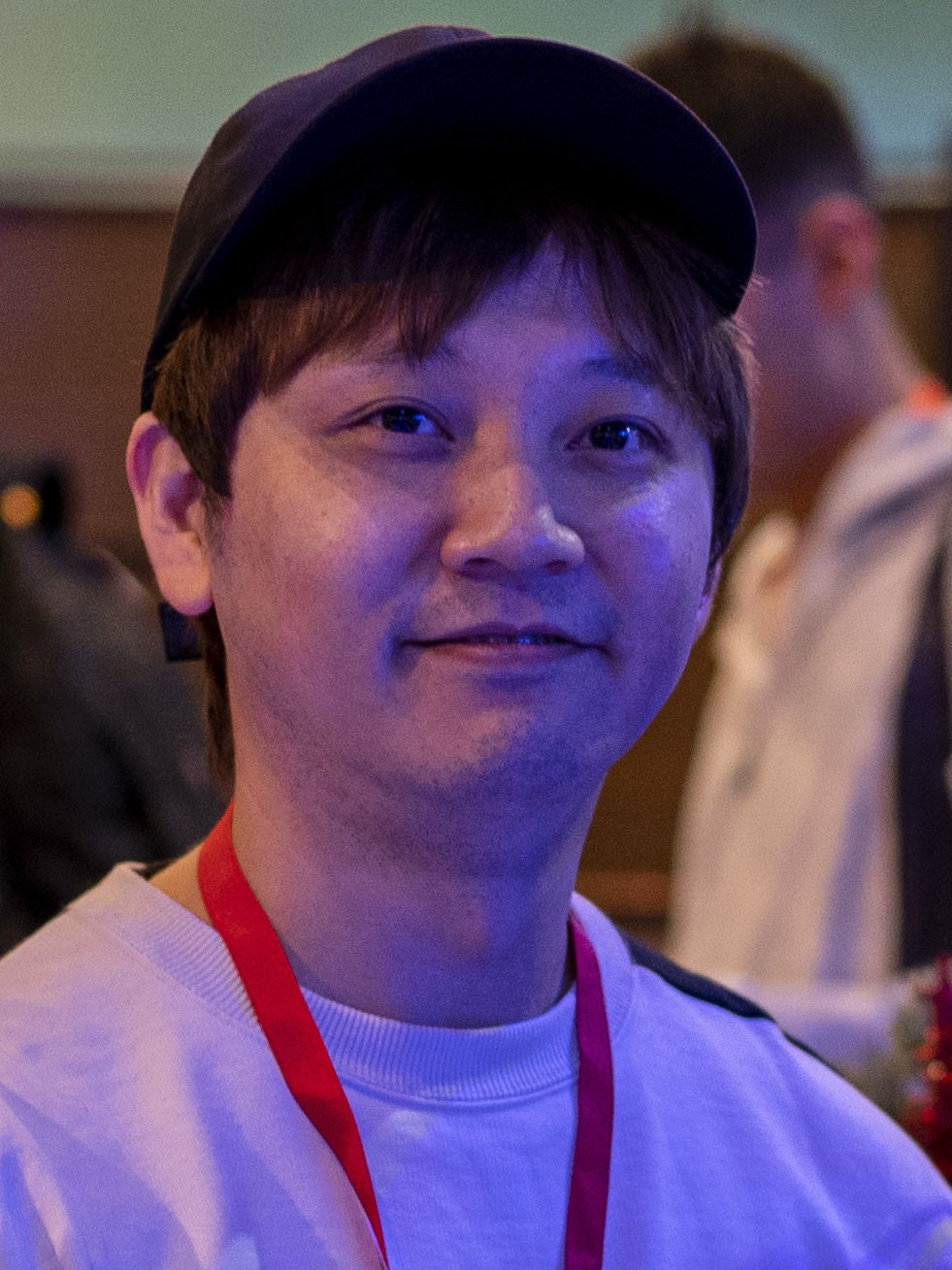
- Hayashi in 2022
- Born: April 2, 1983 (age 43); Zama, Kanagawa Prefecture, Japan
- Occupations: Voice actor; singer
- Years active: 1994–present
- Agent: Ken Production
- Height: 164 cm (5 ft 5 in)
- Spouse: Unknown (m. 2024)

Yū Hayashi (林 勇, Hayashi Yū; born April 2, 1983) is a Japanese voice actor and singer from Kanagawa Prefecture attached to Ken Production. Formerly a child actor attached to Gekidan Himawari, he mainly specializes in dubbing roles. He is the vocalist of Screen Mode, a band signed with Lantis.

== Personal life ==
Hayashi announced through a post on his official social media account that he had registered his marriage with his non-celebrity partner.

== Filmography ==
=== Television animation ===
- Ultra Maniac (2003) (Yuta Kirishima)
- Get Ride! AM Driver (2005) (Hans)
- Big Windup! (2007) (Toshihiko Maekawa)
- Stitch! (2009) (Tetsuo)
- JoJo's Bizarre Adventure: Battle Tendency (2012) (Smokey Brown)
- Haikyū!! (2014) (Ryūnosuke Tanaka)
- Love Stage!! (2014) (Saotome-sensei)
- Kuroko's Basketball (2015) (Shigehiro Ogiwara)
- Haikyū!! Season 2 (2015) (Ryūnosuke Tanaka)
- Big Order (2016) (Ayahito Sundan)
- Bungo Stray Dogs (2016) (Tachihara Michizō)
- Cheer Boys!! (2016) (Kōji Tōno)
- Mob Psycho 100 (2016) (Tsuyoshi Edano)
- Haikyū!! Season 3 (2016) (Ryūnosuke Tanaka)
- Banana Fish (2018) (Abraham Dawson)
- Muhyo & Roji's Bureau of Supernatural Investigation (2018-2020) (Jirō "Roji" Kusano)
- YU-NO: A Girl Who Chants Love at the Bound of this World (2019) (Takuya Arima)
- Haikyū!! TO THE TOP (2020) (Ryūnosuke Tanaka)
- Jujutsu Kaisen (2020) (Ino Takuma)
- Tokyo Revengers (2021) (Manjirō "Mikey" Sano)
- Vinland Saga Season 2 (2023) (Olmar)
- Yu-Gi-Oh! Go Rush!! (2023) (Tremolo Ryugu)
- Jujutsu Kaisen Season 2 (2023) (Ino Takuma)
- Tokyo Revengers: Christmas Showdown (2023) (Manjirō "Mikey" Sano)
- Paradox Live the Animation (2023) (Yohei Kanbayashi)
- Tower of God 2nd Season (2024) (Edin Dan)
- Your Forma (2025) (Benno)
- Wandance (2025) (Usen Takumi)
- You and Idol Pretty Cure (2025) (Kazuma / Jogi)
- The Elusive Samurai (2026) (Iwamatsu Tsuneie)

=== Theatrical animation ===
- Memories (1995) (The Boy)
- Mobile Suit Gundam: Cucuruz Doan's Island (2022) (Danan Rashica)
- Jujutsu Kaisen 0 (2021) (Ino Takuma)
- Haikyu!! The Dumpster Battle (2024) (Ryūnosuke Tanaka)

=== Video games ===
- Heart of Darkness (1998) (Andy)
- Imabikisō (2007) (Hiroki Makimura)
- Kingdom Hearts II (2005) (Peter Pan)
- Kingdom Hearts Birth by Sleep (2011) (Peter Pan)
- Kingdom Hearts RE:Chain of Memories (2007) (Peter Pan)
- Judgment (2018) (Issei Hoshino)
- Mr Love: Queen's Choice (2019) (Kanya)
- Lost Judgment (2021) (Issei Hoshino)
- Final Fantasy Type-0 (2011) (Enra)
- Octopath Traveler II (2023) (Ritsu)
- Zenless Zone Zero (2024) (Billy Kid)
- Mario Kart World (2025)
- Donkey Kong Bananza (2025) (Void Kong)
- Fatal Fury: City of the Wolves (2026) (Manjiro Sano)

=== Dubbing roles ===
==== Live-action ====
- Shia LaBeouf
  - Even Stevens (Louis Anthony Stevens)
  - The Nightmare Room (Dylan Pierce) (Episode 2: "Scareful What You Wish For")
  - Holes (Stanley Yelnats)
  - Disturbia (Kale Brecht)
- Alvin and the Chipmunks (Theodore) (Jesse McCartney)
- Alvin and the Chipmunks: The Squeakquel (Theodore) (Jesse McCartney)
- Alvin and the Chipmunks: Chipwrecked (Theodore) (Jesse McCartney)
- Alvin and the Chipmunks: The Road Chip (Theodore) (Jesse McCartney)
- The Amityville Horror (Billy Lutz (Jesse James))
- Avengers: Doomsday (Johnny Storm / Human Torch (Joseph Quinn)
- Beethoven (Ted Newton (Christopher Castile))
- Cory in the House (Newton "Newt" Livingston III (Jason Dolley))
- E.T. the Extra-Terrestrial (2002 DVD edition) (Michael (Robert MacNaughton))
- The Fantastic Four: First Steps (Johnny Storm / Human Torch (Joseph Quinn))
- Fun Size (Roosevelt Leroux (Thomas Mann))
- Gentlemen Broncos (Benjamin Purvis (Michael Angarano))
- Good Luck Charlie (PJ Duncan (Jason Dolley))
- Home Alone 2: Lost in New York (TV Asahi edition) (Kevin McCallister (Macaulay Culkin))
- Justin Bieber: Never Say Never (Justin Bieber)
- Kindergarten Cop (1995 TV Asahi edition) (Dominic (Christian and Joseph Cousins))
- My Girl (TV Asahi edition) (Thomas J. Sennett (Macaulay Culkin))
- My Soul to Take (Alex Dunkelman (John Magaro))
- Okja (Jay (Paul Dano))
- Overlord (Private First Class Lyle Tibbet (John Magaro))
- Percy Jackson & the Olympians: The Lightning Thief (Grover Underwood (Brandon T. Jackson))
- Percy Jackson: Sea of Monsters (Grover Underwood (Brandon T. Jackson))
- The Perks of Being a Wallflower (Charlie Kelmeckis (Logan Lerman))
- The Purge (Charlie Sandin (Max Burkholder))
- Shazam! (2021 THE CINEMA edition) (Billy Batson (Asher Angel))
- Smallville (Pete Ross (Sam Jones III))
- A Thousand Words (Aaron Wiseberger (Clark Duke))
- Yogi Bear (Boo-Boo Bear (Justin Timberlake))

==== Animation ====
- 101 Dalmatian Street (Dylan)
- Bambi (Young Bambi)
- House of Mouse (Peter Pan)
- Jellystone! (Boo Boo)
- The Little Mermaid II: Return to the Sea (Handsome Boy)
- The New Adventures of Winnie the Pooh (Christopher Robin)
- Rated A for Awesome (Lester "Les" Awesome)
- Return to Never Land (Peter Pan)
- Sausage Party (Barry)
- South Park (Kyle Broflovski (FOX dub) (Matt Stone))
- Steven Universe (Steven (Zach Callison))

=== Japanese voice-over ===
- Peter Pan's Flight (Peter Pan)

=== Multimedia projects ===
- Paradox Live (2019) (Yohei Kanbayashi)
- Fragaria Memories (2023) (Merold)
- From Argonavis (2023) (Ryusuke Tennoji)
