= Haikyu!! season 1 =

First season of Haikyu!! anime television series

Haikyu!!
- Season 1
- Cover of the first season DVD released by Sentai Filmworks
- No. of episodes: 25

Release
- Original network: MBS
- Original release: April 6 – September 21, 2014

Season chronology
- Next → Season 2

The first season of Haikyu!!, the anime television series, was produced by Production I.G and was directed by Susumu Mitsunaka, with Taku Kishimoto handling the series composition, Takahiro Kishida creating the character designs, and Yuki Hayashi and Asami Tachibana who composed the music.

It adapted the "Karasuno High Team Formation" (chapters 1–35) and "Interhigh" (chapters 36–71) story arcs from the original manga series of the same name written by Haruichi Furudate. The series was announced in the manga's eighth volume, and aired from April 6 to September 21, 2014, on MBS, and other JNN stations, with English subtitles on Crunchyroll. The anime has been licensed for digital and home video release by Sentai Filmworks.

The series uses four pieces of theme music: two opening themes and two ending themes. From episodes 1–13, the opening theme song is "Imagination" by Spyair, while the ending theme song is "Tenchi Gaeshi" by Nico Touches the Walls. For episodes 14 through 25, the opening is "Ah Yeah" by Sukima Switch, and the ending is "Leo" by Tacica. "Ah Yeah" is also used as the ending for episode 14, which has no opening.

== Episodes ==
No. overall	No. in season	Title	Directed by	Written by	Original release date
1	1	"The End and The Beginning"; Transliteration: "Owari to hajimari" (Japanese: 終わりと始まり)	Susumu Mitsunaka	Taku Kishimoto	April 6, 2014
Shoyo Hinata is inspired by the Small Giant playing volleyball on TV. Three years later, Hinata goes to his first ever volleyball tournament and his team is paired against Kitagawa Daiichi, the school of Tobio Kageyama, also known as the King of the Court. Their match against each other leaves them both interested in their skills and sparks a rivalry. They meet again the next year, but this time as teammates in their new high school–Karasuno.
2	2	"Karasuno High School Volleyball Team"; Transliteration: "Karasuno kōkō haikyūbu" (Japanese: 烏野高校排球部)	Kōichi Kikuta	Taku Kishimoto	April 13, 2014
As Hinata arrives at his new school Karasuno High School, he is shocked when he walks into the gym and finds Kageyama who is also the new member of the team. The two personalities clash, and later captain Daichi Sawamura arrives to throw the two off and tells them they cannot join the club until they start to get along. A few days pass and the two get envious. Instead of agreeing to work as a team though, they challenge the 3rd years to a match on the condition that if they win, they join the team. If they lose, as long as the third years are around, Kageyama will never play as setter.
3	3	"A Formidable Ally"; Transliteration: "Saikyō no mikata" (Japanese: 最強の味方)	Tomoko Hiramuki	Taku Kishimoto	April 20, 2014
Sawamura accepts the proposal match of Hinata and Kageyama, but he alters it. It will be a 3-on-3 first years match instead of third years. Sawamura reveals he will play on the team that Hinata and Kageyama aren't on and designates Tanaka Ryuunosuke as their teammate for the match. Kageyama and Hinata meet fellow first years Kei Tsukishima and Tadashi Yamaguchi. Tsukishima reveals he is a blocker that no one has been successful against, and he reveals why Kageyama was known as the "King of the Court" in Junior High. Hinata refuses to accept his explanation though, and at secret practices in the morning Kageyama, Hinata, and Ryuunosuke begin to improve Hinata's serve receive and fine tune his spike attack.
4	4	"The View From the Summit"; Transliteration: "Itadaki no keshiki" (Japanese: 頂の景色)	Shintarō Itoga	Taku Kishimoto	April 27, 2014
The practice match that will determine the future of Kageyama and Hinata begins as Kageyama, Hinata, and Ryuunosuke battle Tsukishima, Yamaguchi, and captain Sawamura in a 3-on-3 first-years match. During the match, Kageyama begins to fall into his old setting habits, making it hard for Hinata and Ryuunosuke to spike the ball. When he does get in sync with them however, Tsukishima is predicting his moves and is managing to block all their spikes, in addition to his great height. It looks like it will be an easy win in the first set for the captain's team, but then Kageyama and Hinata start to succeed with their quick attack, which could completely change the outcome of the match.
5	5	"A Coward's Anxiety"; Transliteration: "Shōshinmono no kinchō" (Japanese: 小心者の緊張)	Yasuo Ejima	Taku Kishimoto	May 4, 2014
Kageyama and Hinata begin to get in sync. As Kageyama's sets start hitting Hinata's hands every time, Tsukishima is forced to change his tactics at blocking. This frees Ryuunosuke up on the other side, and the team of Kageyama, Hinata, and Ryu is able to rally and win the 3-on-3 first-years match. Submitting to the deal, Kageyama and Hinata are accepted as official team members. Just then, the volleyball team's new teacher-in-charge Ittetsu Takeda arrives and announces he has been able to arrange a practice match with Aoba Johsai High, one of the schools with a top volleyball team in the prefecture. However, Aoba Johsai agrees to play on one condition: Kageyama must act as the setter for the entire match. Upon the news, Karasuno begins to practice harder for the match, but Hinata is submitting badly to pressure.
6	6	"An Interesting Team"; Transliteration: "Omoshiroi chīmu" (Japanese: 面白いチーム)	Tomohiro Hirata	Taku Kishimoto	May 11, 2014
Sawamura, Ryuunosuke, Kageyama, Hinata, Tsukishima, and Yamaguchi was played as their Karasuno team for a practice match against Aoba Johsai. Before the match even Kageyama runs into his old teammate, Yutaro Kindaichi, who continually calls him the "King of the Court" and promises they will defeat. Once the match gets underway though, the quick attack of Kageyama and Hinata proves to be an effective weapon. However, Kageyama reveals that he doesn't think Aoba Johsai is using their true setter.
7	7	"Versus the Great King"; Transliteration: "VS "Daiō-sama"" (Japanese: VS "大王様")	Rokō Ogiwara	Taku Kishimoto	May 18, 2014
Toru Oikawa returns for Aoba Johsai. He is revealed to be their captain and their true setter. He was also Kageyama's original senpai. When Oikawa comes up to serve, he starts hitting perfect serves to Tsukishima, resulting in an ace every time. It isn't until Sawamura changes their formation that Karasuno is finally able to win the match against Aoba Johsai. However Oikawa reveals when they next meet, Aoba Johsai will be using all its aces from the start, and a very different result will be expected. On the bus ride home, Sawamura reveals that Karasuno also has a few surprises including a libero who can change the Karasuno's dynamics as a team.
8	8	"The One They Call "Ace""; Transliteration: ""Ēsu" to yobareru hito" (Japanese: "エース"と呼ばれる人)	Yoshihide Ibata	Takuya Satō	May 25, 2014
Yu "Noya" Nishinoya is Karasuno's libero and he returns to help the team start getting better with receiving the ball. However Noya refuses to play in any game until their ace, Azumane returns. Meanwhile, advisor Takeda continues to pursue Keishin Ukai as the next coach of Karasuno High. Ukai tells him he isn't like his grandfather who was the former coach and has no interest in 'babysitting a bunch of teenage boys', but Takeda comes up with a plan he believes will pull Ukai into the world of coaching.
9	9	"A Set For the Ace"; Transliteration: "Ēsu e no tosu" (Japanese: エースへのトス)	Mariko Ishikawa	Taku Kishimoto	June 1, 2014
Ukai agrees to become the next coach of Karasuno after he learns of the upcoming practice match against Karasuno's former rival Nekoma High, but only until the practice match is finished. To learn the strengths of each of the current players, he arranges an exhibition for them against his local volleyball association, a group that happens to be alumni of Karasuno. Third-year student Koshi Sugawara and Noya are placed on the association to allow an even match, as only four of the players had been able to make it. Filling in the last spot is Azumane, whom Hinata spots out the window. Now Azumane must prove that he deserves the title ace and get past the triple block of Kageyama, Ryuunosuke, and Tsukishima to regain his lost confidence.
10	10	"Yearning"; Transliteration: "Akogare" (Japanese: 憧れ)	Shintarō Itoga	Taku Kishimoto	June 8, 2014
The practice match goes on with Karasuno down 1-0 against the Neighborhood Association. Ukai manages to see firsthand how Hinata can be the ultimate decoy and learns how quickly Kageyama and Hinata have grown together as a duo. He also witnesses firsthand how Hinata's speed is difficult to keep up with. However an off-speed serve allows the Neighborhood Association to get four straight aces and take a 24-18 lead. On the final point Ryuunosuke finally gets the chance to spike, but Yu manages to save the spike, and Azumane ends the game with a killer spike. Now Ukai must decide whom the regular starters will be. One thing is for certain, the duo of Kageyama and Hinata seem to have their fates tied together. Ukai also decides practice for the first and second years will focus mainly on receiving serves to address the team's biggest weakness.
11	11	"The Decision"; Transliteration: "Ketsudan" (Japanese: 決断)	Hirotaka Endō	Taku Kishimoto	June 15, 2014
Karasuno heads off to the training camp. During a jog, Hinata gets lost and runs into a volleyball player in a red jersey named Kenma Kozume. Kenma reveals what team he plays for one of his teammates show up and leads him off to a practice match. After hesitating to decide a starting lineup, Ukai goes with Sawamura, Nishinoya, Azumane, Ryuunosuke, Tsukishima, Kageyama, and Hinata. Ukai reveals in the past Nekoma hasn't had outstanding players, but they have been a team that thrives on receives and kills. Karasuno's players receive their jerseys, and Hinata has the number 10, the same number as his idol the "Little Giant". He learns that the Little Giant was the only Karasuno team that has made nationals and thinks it is fate. Nekoma and Karasuno line up outside and meet each other face-to-face.
12	12	"The Cat and Crow Reunion"; Transliteration: "Neko to karasu no saikai" (Japanese: ネコとカラスの再会)	Yasuo Ejima	Toshimitsu Takeuchi	June 22, 2014
Nekoma and Karasuno begin their match with Kageyama and Hinata connecting on a quick attack that gives Karasuno the 1-0 lead. Nekoma realizes they're up against a genius setter, so they decide to start marking Hinata. Hinata's blocker gets used to his speed and feints and begins to start blocking his shots, allowing Nekoma to win the first set 25-22; however Kageyama uses the opportunity to teach Hinata how to do a straight attack and how to use his eyes to find the holes in the opponents defense. Hinata ends up managing to change his spike path in mid-air during set 2. It ends up going long, but Hinata realizes he has a new dangerous weapon to go along with his quick attack if he can master it.
13	13	"Worthy Adversaries"; Transliteration: "Raibaru" (Japanese: 好敵手(ライバル))	Takaaki Suzuki	Toshimitsu Takeuchi	June 29, 2014
Nekoma and Karasuno play the second set to an epic 25-23 showdown, but in the end Karasuno falls just short. However, the two schools reform a rivalry that is better than time could imagine. The two come to realize they each have similar personalities on their teams, and they each have first years with goals and ambitions. Best of all, they realize that they're starting to unite as a team. Despite being thoroughly crushed, Karasuno vows to get revenge on the national stage. In the end, Ukai agrees to become the Karasuno's regular full-time coach.
14	14	"Formidable Opponents"; Transliteration: "Kyōteki-tachi" (Japanese: 強敵たち)	Tomoko Hiramuki	Taku Kishimoto	July 6, 2014
The bracket for the Inter-High is announced. Karasuno has its final practices and works on back-end spikes and signals. The lost Karasuno flag that says Fly is revealed. Hinata and Kageyama reveal they've had a race every morning to the gym since they've been teammates. Kageyama currently leads 32-30, but Hinata vows to defeat him in every way possible until they can faceoff in a match against each other again. Yamaguchi secretly works on mastering the jump float serve so he won't be the only first year without an ability to contribute to the team. Ukai begins farming in the morning as another source of income for the family store.
15	15	"Revival"; Transliteration: "Fukkatsu" (Japanese: 復活)	Kiyoshi Murayama	Taku Kishimoto	July 13, 2014
Karasuno arrives for their first matches on both the boys and girls sides of the tourney. On the boys side people talk about how Karasuno did well in the past but they were now crashed ravens. On the girls side they contemplate how they should have practiced more. Aoba Johsai watches from the stands and wonders how the addition of a coach and two new players will change Karasuno's attack. As the match against Tokonami High begins, Kageyama sets to Ryuunosuke for the quick spike and kill. The second point goes to the ace, Azumane. Finally, the quick attack of Kageyama and Hinata is unveiled on the third point. Karasuno now leads 3-0 in the first set, but others have just realized that Karasuno is back and possibly better than ever.
16	16	"Winners and Losers"; Transliteration: "Shousha to haisha" (Japanese: 勝者と敗者)	Shintarō Itoga	Taku Kishimoto	July 20, 2014
Karasuno's boys team easily wins the first set 25-12, but the Captain's old friend delivers one phrase that makes Karasuno stay serious for set 2. Kageyama scores five quick service aces, and Karasuno's boys team wins second set and the match 25-14. The girls team isn't so lucky as they fall in two sets and wonder what they could've done to be able to keep playing. After some promises are made to those who have lost, Karasuno's freshmen learn how just three months before Karasuno was shut down by Date Tech, their second round opponent. Ukai goes with the same lineup from the first game, and Yu delivers a speech that boosts the morale of the upperclassmen. The team is now ready for match 2 against Date Tech.
17	17	"The Iron Wall"; Transliteration: "Teppeki" (Japanese: 鉄壁)	Takashi Ōtsuka	Toshimitsu Takeuchi	July 27, 2014
Date Tech and Karasuno battle it out in the second round. Date Tech's giant named Takanobu Aone reveals that he is targeting Hinata, forcing Kageyama to reveal the super quick attack. Soon after, Aone block Hinata's attack and proves why his team is called the "Iron Wall". The super quick attack seems to give Karasuno a slight advantage, allowing them to take an 18-16 lead. When the giant targets Hinata on a super quick attack, Karasuno is able to reveal their last ace. Karasuno perfects their version of Nekoma's "The Pipe" by getting a delayed set to Azumane, who is set up behind Hinata. Karasuno has now played all their trump cards, or so everyone else thinks.
18	18	"Guarding Your Back"; Transliteration: "Senaka no mamori" (Japanese: 背中の護り)	Yumi Kamakura	Toshimitsu Takeuchi	August 3, 2014
Karasuno manages to get on a roll and steals the first set 25-21. In set two, they perform a double rotation to get Hinata away from the Giant #7. While this free's up Hinata for more quick attacks, it also means the matches result will rely heavily on Asahi's ability to blast through the Iron Wall as he faces #7. When Hinata becomes the vanguard up front, Karasuno is able to slowly increase their lead. However, Hinata commits a service error and rotates to the back with the score of 24-22. Should they go to a third game, Karasuno knows they will be at a disadvantage. It all relies on Asahi's skills to get past the wall. As the match ends with a win and Karasuno is leaving the gym, they look over to see Aoba Johsai are up 24-13 in their first set of the first round.
19	19	"The Conductor"; Transliteration: "Shikisha" (Japanese: 指揮者)	Hirotaka Endō	Taku Kishimoto	August 10, 2014
Karasuno observes Aoba Johsai's second match and decide to focus on attacking Oikawa, especially after a local TV interview focuses solely on Oikawa's skills. The match takes place the next day, and Karasuno seems to be more motivated than ever. The match begins with Oikawa do a quick setter dump to give Aoba Johsai's first point, and he follows it up with a fake dump serve giving them a 2-0 lead. However, Kageyama reveals that he haven't do a trick of his own yet and pulls a server dump off right back cutting the lead down to 2-1.
20	20	"Oikawa Toru Is Not a Genius"; Transliteration: "Oikawa Tooru wa tensai dewanai" (Japanese: 及川徹は天才ではない)	Shintarō Itoga	Taku Kishimoto	August 17, 2014
Oikawa and Kageyama continue to play against each other as they try to prove who is the better setter. Their junior high days compared through the episode as Oikawa, consider less naturally gifted was shown to be in conflict with Kageyama who are more talented naturally. During the match, Aoba Johsai begins to anticipate Kageyama's movements with ease, which is about to cause him to go into his "King Mode". Suddenly, Sugawara is substituting for Kageyama as a setter.
21	21	"Senpai's True Abilities"; Transliteration: "Senpai no jitsuryoku" (Japanese: 先輩の実力)	Tomoko Hiramuki; Tetsuaki Watanabe	Taku Kishimoto	August 24, 2014
Sugawara substitutes for Kageyama which seals the first set for Aoba Johsai. Kageyama is shocked as he watches the real ability of Sugawara in setting. Sugawara not only tries his hardest in setting, but encourages other people to give a little extra when playing their respective positions. Aoba Johsai is shocked when Hinata didn't speak or call for the sets that an opponent knows. Karasuno takes the lead in set 2, but Oikawa's predictions start coming true and allow Aoba Johsai to get back into the match.
22	22	"Evolution"; Transliteration: "Shinka" (Japanese: 進化)	Toshiaki Kanbara	Taku Kishimoto	August 31, 2014
Hajime Iwaizumi gives narration of other side of Oikawa that he sees from 12 years being his team mates. After being subbed back in, Kageyama begins to try to communicate with each of his teammates. He begins to learn where the best setting point is for each of them, and Tsukishima comes up with a new attack that proves Karasuno can be a threat from all fronts.
23	23	"The Play to Shift the Momentum"; Transliteration: "Nagare o kaeru ippon" (Japanese: 流れを変える一本)	Kōichi Kikuta	Taku Kishimoto	September 7, 2014
Aoba Johsai begins to pull away in set 3, which makes Coach Ukai a dramatic decisions on his team. Yamaguchi is subbed in as a pinch server, but the pressure proves to be too much to overcome. A service error occurs, but the error allows Karasuno to calm down and climb back within two. Asahi and Hinata's spikes allowing Karasuno to tie the score at 24. The team who gets a two point lead, wins the set and the match.
24	24	"'Lonely King' No More"; Transliteration: "Datsu "kodoku no ou-sama"" (Japanese: 脱・"孤独の王様")	Susumu Mitsunaka	Taku Kishimoto	September 14, 2014
Kageyama begins to match Oikawa point for point, as the teams become dead even at 25 a piece. Long sets begin to drain both teams, and Oikawa acknowledges that Kageyama has realized what teamwork is all about and is no longer the solitary king. Both teams get points simultaneously and reach 31-31. Soon after, Aoba Johsai is able to block Hinata's spike and wins the match by a score of 33-31, much to Karasuno's devastation. Oikawa comments that Kageyama is no longer a lonely king. And he became a decent king from a dictator king. They get ready for their quarter final match. In the ending scene, Coach Ukai treat all the members of Karasuno with food and tells them that food is essential to be strong.
25	25	"The Third Day"; Transliteration: "Mikka-me" (Japanese: 三日目)	Jōji Furuta	Taku Kishimoto	September 21, 2014
This episode features the flashback scenes of the match between Karasuno and Aoba Johsai before the day. Everyone in Karasuno's volleyball team is depressed after their loss. Elsewhere, Aoba Johsai battles Shiratorizawa. The third years have a talk with their manager about their future. Hinata and Kageyama shout at their peak in the gymnasium to get over the sadness. As the other Karasuno's teammates arrive, the third years have decided to continue the play instead of retiring. Ukai is requested to be the coach again, and he agrees. He reveals that Shiratorizawa won by 25-23 against Seijoh, and Karasuno begins their first real practice to get ready for the spring tournament.
