= Attack on Titan: Junior High =

Japanese manga series

- First tankōbon volume cover

進撃！巨人中学校 (Shingeki! Kyojin band Chūgakkō)
- Genre: Comedy; Parody
- Created by: Hajime Isayama
- Manga
- Written by: Saki Nakagawa
- Published by: Kodansha
- English publisher: US: Kodansha USA
- Magazine: Bessatsu Shōnen Magazine
- Original run: April 9, 2012 – July 9, 2016
- Volumes: 11
- Anime television series
- Directed by: Yoshihide Ibata
- Written by: Midori Gotou
- Music by: Asami Tachibana; Hiroyuki Sawano
- Studio: Production I.G
- Licensed by: Crunchyroll (Note: Formerly known as Funimation.)
- Original network: MBS, Tokyo MX, RKK, BS11, SBS
- English network: SEA: Aniplus Asia
- Original run: October 4, 2015 – December 20, 2015
- Episodes: 12
- Manga

Attack on Titan: High School – Youth! The Marley Academy Next Door
- Written by: Saki Nakagawa
- Published by: Kodansha
- Magazine: Bessatsu Shōnen Magazine
- Original run: June 9, 2018 – August 9, 2018
- Volumes: 1
- icon

Attack on Titan: Junior High (Japanese: 進撃！巨人中学校, Hepburn: Shingeki! Kyojin Chūgakkō; lit. "Attack! Titan Middle school") is a Japanese comedy manga series written and illustrated by Saki Nakagawa and published in Bessatsu Shōnen Magazine from April 2012 to July 2016. The series is a parody of Hajime Isayama's manga series Attack on Titan (進撃の巨人, Shingeki no Kyojin).

The manga has been adapted into an anime television series which began airing in October 2015. A rebroadcast was aired during January 2016. A sequel, Attack on Titan: High School (進撃！巨人高校, Shingeki! Kyojin Kōkō; lit. 'Attack! Titan High School'), known by its subtitle, Youth! The Marley Academy Next Door (～青春！となりのマーレ学園～ ~Seishun! Tonari no Māre Gakuen~) ran from June 2018 to August 2018 and consisted of six chapters.

== Plot ==
The story is a parody of the Attack on Titan manga, featuring younger, chibi versions of the characters as they attend the "Class 1-04" at the Attack Junior High School (進撃中学校, Shingeki Chūgakkō). The story focuses on their adventures during the first year at school.

== Characters ==
=== First-year students ===
Eren Yeager (エレン・イェーガー, Eren Yēgā)

English: "Eren Jaeger"

Voiced by: Yuki Kaji (Japanese); Bryce Papenbrook (English)
Eren Yeager is a hot-blooded young boy who especially enjoys eating cheeseburgers. He harbors an intense hatred of Titans due to an incident where the Colossal Titan (the principal of the Titan campus) stole his lunch, and is driven to break school rules in order to eliminate all the Titans in the world. While he does not have the uncanny strength of Mikasa or the intelligence of Armin, his ambition to exterminate the Titans drives him to complete and exceed his goals, and astonish his classmates with his passion and drive.
Mikasa Ackerman (ミカサ・アッカーマン, Mikasa Akkāman)

English: "Mikasa Ackermann"

Voiced by: Yui Ishikawa (Japanese); Trina Nishimura (English)
Mikasa Ackerman is a stoic girl who seemingly has a handle on most situations that often disarrays, scares or incapacitates her peers. She is very close to Eren, to the point that she becomes depressed and all her abilities are greatly reduced when he is not present. She is very protective of both Eren and Armin, seeing them as her precious family she cannot lose.
Armin Arlert (アルミン・アルレルト, Arumin Arureruto)

English: "Armin Arlelt"

Voiced by: Marina Inoue (Japanese); Jessie James Grelle (English)
Armin Arlert is a very intelligent but sickly boy who regularly wears a futon over his head to avoid catching a cold. He is a good friend to Eren and Mikasa, and frequently relies on their protection. Despite his poor self-esteem, his intellect often serves to aid his friends in bad situations.
Reiner Braun (ライナー・ブラウン, Rainā Buraun)
Voiced by: Yoshimasa Hosoya (Japanese); Robert McCollum (English)
Reiner Braun is a very muscular student, who is always seen together with his friend Bertolt, for whom he tries to help find a girlfriend. He has a crush on Krista and always tries to woo her.
Bertolt Hoover (ベルトルト・フーバー, Berutoruto Fūbā)

English: "Bertholdt Hoover"

Voiced by: Tomohisa Hashizume (Japanese); David Matranga (English)
Bertolt Hoover is a very tall, quiet student and a close friend to Reiner, and loves die-cutting as a hobby. He secretly crushes on Annie during the summer festival.
Annie Leonhart (アニ・レオンハート, Ani Reonhāto)
Voiced by: Yū Shimamura (Japanese); Lauren Landa (English)
Annie Leonhart is an introverted girl whose strength rivals that of Mikasa. Like Eren, she also loves cheeseburgers and attends student council.
Jean Kirstein (ジャン・キルシュタイン, Jan Kirushutain)

English: "Jean Kirschtein"

Voiced by: Kishō Taniyama (Japanese); Mike McFarland (English)
Jean Kirstein is an egotistic boy whose primary concern in school is becoming popular amongst girls. He has a crush on Mikasa, and frequently comes into conflict with Eren.
Marco Bott (マルコ・ボット, Maruko Botto)

English: "Marco Bodt"

Voiced by: Ryōta Ōsaka (Japanese); Austin Tindle (English)
Marco Bott is a friendly student and a good friend to Jean, whom he tries his best to help.
Connie Springer (コニー・スプリンガー, Konī Supuringā)

English: "Conny Springer"

Voiced by: Hiro Shimono (Japanese); Clifford Chapin (English)
Connie Springer is a sporty, outgoing boy with a buzz cut. Despite his upbeat personality, he is quite slow-witted.
Sasha Blouse (サシャ・ブラウス, Sasha Burausu)

English: "Sasha Braus"

Voiced by: Yū Kobayashi (Japanese); Ashly Burch (English)
Sasha Blouse is a fun-loving girl with a gluttonous appetite who spends most of her time thinking about food.
Historia Reiss (ヒストリア・レイス, Hisutoria Reisu)
Voiced by: Shiori Mikami (Japanese); Bryn Apprill (English)
Also known as Krista Lenz (クリスタ・レンズ, Kurisuta Renzu). (Note: Spelled as "Christa Lenz" in the anime.) She is a petite, friendly and warm-hearted girl who is well loved by her peers, to the point many express their wishes to marry her. Her father is Rod Reiss.
Ymir (ユミル, Yumiru)
Voiced by: Saki Fujita (Japanese); Elizabeth Maxwell (English)
Ymir is a close friend of Krista. She is extremely protective of Krista, often thwarting Reiner, is always around her side, and she openly claims to want to marry her.
Thomas Wagner (トーマス・ワグナー, Tōmasu Wagunā)
Voiced by: Shigeyuki Susaki (Japanese); Duncan Brannan (English)
Thomas Wagner is one of Eren's classmates.
Mīna Carolina (ミーナ・カロライナ, Mīna Karoraina)
Voiced by: Chika Anzai (Japanese); Alexis Tipton (English)
Mīna Carolina is one of Eren's classmates.
Hannah Diamant (ハンナ・ディアマント, Hanna Diamanto)
Voiced by: Megumi Satō (Japanese); Tia Ballard (English)
Hannah Diamant is one of Eren's classmates. She spends almost the entire time affectionately hugging her boyfriend Franz, rather than paying attention to anything else around them.
Franz Kefka (フランツ・ケフカ, Furantsu Kefuka)
Voiced by: Kenta Ōkuma (Japanese); James Chandler (English)
Franz Kefka is one of Eren's classmates. He spends almost the entire time affectionately hugging his girlfriend Hannah, rather than paying attention to anything else around them.
Hitch Dreyse (ヒッチ・ドリス, Hitchi Dorisu)
Voiced by: Akeno Watanabe (Japanese); Brittney Karbowski (English)
Hitch Dreyse is a fellow student and a student council friend of Annie, and likes to poke fun of her other classmate, Marlowe. Though she denies it, Hitch is a fanatic cat lover.
Marlowe Freudenberg (マルロ・フロイデンベルク, Maruro Furoidenberuku)

English: "Marlo Freudenberg"

Voiced by: Tomokazu Sugita (Japanese); Todd Haberkorn (English)
Marlowe Freudenberg is a fellow student and student council fellow of Annie.

=== Second-year students ===
Petra Ral (ペトラ・ラル, Petora Raru)

English: "Petra Rall"

Voiced by: Natsuki Aikawa (Japanese); Caitlin Glass (English)
Petra Ral is a member of the secret unauthorized club, the Scout Regiment. She is very friendly and welcoming to the freshmen, but is cruelly sarcastic to her fellow member Oluo.
Oluo Bozado (オルオ・ボザド, Oruo Bozado)

English: "Oluo Bozado"

Voiced by: Shinji Kawada (Japanese); Chris Smith (English)
Oluo Bozado is a member of the Scout Regiment club. He is narcissistic and has a nasty tendency to bite his tongue frequently for no reason.
Eld Jinn (エルド・ジン, Erudo Jin)

English: "Eld Gin"

Voiced by: Susumu Chiba (Japanese); Vic Mignogna (English)
Eld Jinn is a member of the Scout Regiment club.
Günther Schultz (グンタ・シュルツ, Gunta Shurutsu)
Voiced by: Kozo Mito (Japanese); Brett Weaver (English)
Günther Schultz is a member of the Scout Regiment club.
Rico Brzenska (リコ・ブレツェンスカ, Riko Buretsensuka)
Voiced by: Michiko Kaiden (Japanese); Morgan Garrett (English)
Rico Brzenska is the leader of the Wall Cleanup Club, which Eren and his friends are forced to join, and is in charge of scrubbing off the graffiti painted on the wall by the Titan pranksters. She teaches the younger students on how to scale the wall using the Vertical Maneuvering Gears.
Ian Dietrich (イアン・ディートリッヒ, Ian Dītorihhi)
Voiced by: Yūya Murakami (Japanese); Garret Storms (English)
Ian Dietrich is one of Rico's sidekicks and the deputy leader of the Wall Cleanup Club.
Ilse Langnar (イルゼ・ラングナー, Iruze Rangunā)
Voiced by: Sachi Kokuryu (Japanese); Marissa Lenti (English)
Ilse Langnar is a senior student who works as the gossip reporter of the Newspaper Club, and is constantly recording notes in her journal.

=== Third-year students ===
Levi Ackerman (リヴァイ・アッカーマン, Rivai Akkāman)

English: "Levi Ackermann" (Note: Officially named as "Levi" per Kodansha's manga releases and its anime website.)

Voiced by: Hiroshi Kamiya (Japanese); Matthew Mercer (English)
Levi is the leader of Attack Junior High's secret underground club, Scout Regiment, and is reputed to be the strongest man in the world, capable of knocking out a Titan with a single slap from his paper fan. He has a compulsive trait for tidiness.
Hange Zoë (ハンジ・ゾエ, Hanji Zoe)

English: "Zoë Hange" (Note: Hange's name is arranged as "Hange Zoë" in the official translation of the manga published by Kodansha USA, as well as in the official Attack on Titan Guidebook: Inside & Outside and the Attack on Titan Character Encyclopedia, also published by Kodansha USA. It was reversed to "Zoë Hange" in the Funimation English dub. In Japan, the character's name has been romanized as "Hans Zoe" on the official anime website. Like its main counterpart, Isayama posted in his blog in 2011 that he responded to a question regarding Hange's gender, saying, "Perhaps [Hange's gender] is better left unstated". In 2014, Kodansha USA stated they went back through volume 5 and removed gender-specific pronouns they had used for reprint, and references from volume 6 onwards.)

Voiced by: Romi Park (Japanese); Jessica Calvello (English)
Hange Zoë is Levi's classmate and the deputy leader of the Scout Regiment club. Hange is obsessed with anything related to the study of Titans, often to the annoyance of Levi, who calls by the nickname "Abnormal" or "four-eyes".
Mike Zacharius (ミケ・ザカリアス, Mike Zakariasu)

English: "Miche Zacharius"

Voiced by: Kenta Miyake (Japanese); Jason Douglas (English)
Mike Zacharius is a senior student who is a sidekick of Hange, and has a peculiar habit of sniffing younger students.
Moblit Berner (モブリット・バーナー, Moburitto Bānā)
Voiced by: Rintarō Nishi (Japanese); Jerry Jewell (English)
Moblit Berner is a senior student who is a sidekick of Hange. He is regularly frightened and frustrated by Hange's eccentric and reckless behaviours involving Titans.

=== Staff ===
Keith Shadis (キース・シャーディス, Kīsu Shādisu)

English: "Keith Sadies"

Voiced by: Tsuguo Mogami (Japanese); Patrick Seitz (English)
Keith Shadis is the strict and intimidating class teacher of Eren and his friends. He is also a good friend of Eren's father.
Erwin Smith (エルヴィン・スミス, Eruvin Sumisu)
Voiced by: Daisuke Ono (Japanese); J. Michael Tatum (English)
Erwin Smith is a school teacher, a senior member of the teachers' board, and the club adviser of the secret Scout Regiment.
Hannes (ハンネス, Hannesu)
Voiced by: Keiji Fujiwara (Japanese); David Wald (English)
Hannes is the frequently drunk janitor who works at the Titan side of the school campus, and also the adviser of the Wall Cleanup Club. He is a good friend of Eren's mother.
Darius Zackly (ダリス・ザックレー, Darisu Zakkurē)

English: "Darius Zachary"

Voiced by: Hideaki Tezuka (Japanese); John Swasey (English)
Darius Zackly is the head of the teachers' board, and the principal of the human campus of Attack Junior High.
Dot Pixis (ドット・ピクシス, Dotto Pikushisu)

English: "Dot Pyxis"

Voiced by: Masahiko Tanaka (Japanese); R Bruce Elliott (English)
Dot Pixis is a senior member of the teachers' board.
Nile Dok (ナイル・ドーク, Nairu Dōku)

English: "Nile Dawk"

Voiced by: Anri Katsu (Japanese); Ian Sinclair (English)
Nile Dok is a senior member of the teachers' board.
Kitz Weilman (キッツ・ヴェールマン, Kittsu Wēruman)
Voiced by: Tomoyuki Shimura (Japanese); Christopher Sabat (English)
Kitz Weilman is a member of the teachers' board.

=== Other characters ===
Carla Yeager (カルラ・イェーガー, Karura Yēgā)

English: "Carla Jaeger"

Voiced by: Yoshino Takamori (Japanese); Jessica Cavanagh (English)
Carla Jaeger is Eren's mother, who prepares his beloved cheeseburger steak lunch everyday.
Dita Ness (ディータ・ネス, Dīta Nesu)

English: "Dieter Neiss"

Voiced by: Koichi Sakaguchi (Japanese); Jonathan Brooks (English)
Dita Ness is the owner of a shooting gallery at the Summer Festival.
Frieda (フリーダ, Furīda)
Voiced by: Yōko Hikasa (Japanese); Dawn M. Bennett (English)
Frieda is a former student of Attack Junior High, who got lost in the school building during the Test of Courage. She is since condemned to haunt the campus as a ghost, namely "the Seven Wonders of Attack Junior High, No. 7".

== Media ==
=== Manga ===
Saki Nakagawa began publishing Attack on Titan: Junior High in the May issue of Kodansha's monthly manga magazine Bessatsu Shōnen Magazine on April 9, 2012. A special chapter was published in the May issue of the Monthly Shōnen Sirius magazine on March 25, 2014. In the June 2016 issue, published on May 9, Nakagawa commented that the manga would be ending soon; the final chapter was published in the magazine's August issue, on July 9, 2016.

The series was published in tankōbon form by Kodansha. It has been licensed for publication in North America by Kodansha USA. The series has been collected into eleven tankōbon volumes, published as five (Note: Kodansha USA released the series in a 2-in-1 and 3-in-1 omnibus format.) volumes in English. The additional chapters were published in a single volume in August 2018.

=== Sequel ===
A sequel, Attack on Titan: High School (進撃！巨人高校, Shingeki! Kyojin Kōkō; lit. "Attack! Titan High School"), known by its subtitle, Youth! The Marley Academy Next Door (～青春！となりのマーレ学園～, ~Seishun! Tonari no Māre Gakuen~) was published in six chapters between June and August 2018 and collected into one volume.

==== Volumes ====
No.	Original release date	Original ISBN	English release date	English ISBN
1	April 9, 2013	978-4-06-384841-0	March 11, 2014	978-1-61262-916-2
1. "That Did That to That"; 2. "The Suckiest Titan"; 3. "Grandpa Arlert"; 4. "The Alarm Clock Trap"; 5. "The Titan Always Rings Twice"; 6. "They're Titans, After All"; 7. "A Whiff of Something Interesting"; 8. "The Beautifiers"
2	August 9, 2013	978-4-06-394903-2	March 11, 2014	978-1-61262-916-2
9. "This is Not a Game"; 10. "Victory Means Validation"; 11. "Everyone's After School"; 12. "Too Big a Love"; 13. "Coupling"; 14. "No, I am Not Beneath You"; 15. "Upperclassmen are Seriously Scary"; 16. "Absolute Strength"
3	December 9, 2013	978-4-06-394979-7	November 25, 2014	978-1-61262-918-6
17. "Trash Teacher"; 18. "True Colors"; 19. "Love is Fireworks in the Distant Past or Something Like That"; 20. "It's the Summer Festival! Everyone Gather!"; 21. "Capture That Bug! Burning Youth!"; 22. "Tastes Like Mother's Cooking, but She's not the One Making it" 23. "No More Blankets on Your Head"
4	April 9, 2014	978-4-06-395046-5	November 25, 2014	978-1-61262-918-6
24. "Summer Futon Rescue Mission"; 25. "No More Lazing Around in School"; 26. "Far Out, Mr. Hannes"; 27. "Goodbye Mr. Smith"; 28. "Give that Resignation Letter Back!"; 29. "Might as Well Jump"; 30. "I Want to Change"; 31. "Autumn in This Manga"; 32. "High Heat Makes Good Fried Rice"
5	August 8, 2014	978-4-06-395143-1	April 28, 2015	978-1-61262-961-2
"Shiny, Shiny Jr. High Students"; "Food Fight! Sasha"; 33. "The Black School Festival"; 34. "Forever Me"; 35. "How to Take the Culture from a Culture Fair"; 36. "My Young Heart Tickled by Blindfolds"; 37. "Ms. Can-Do is Ms. Popular"; 38. "Everybody Wants to Rule the School"; 39. "Ilse's Rage"
6	December 9, 2014	978-4-06-395254-4	April 28, 2015	978-1-61262-961-2
40. "Do, a Donut, a Female Eating Donuts"; 41. "Be-Bop Junior High"; 42. "Clown Bertolt"; 43. "Iron Chef (14 Years Old)"; "Be-Bop Junior High (Battle of the Four Kings of Heaven Edition)"; "The Boss is No Weakling"; 44. "I'll Expunge the Dirt"; 45. "Final Battle! The Wall Beautification Contest"; 46. "The Conclusion, No Regrets"
7	April 9, 2015	978-4-06-395359-6	December 29, 2015	978-1-63236-113-4
47. "Winter is Coming, So Let's Dance"; "(BTN) Before the New-School-Year-Ceremony"; 48. "Legend of the Snow Titan: The Mystery where Nobody Gets Killed or Something Like That"; 49. "Legend of the Snow Titan (and so on): All the Answers"; "Gimme Bread, Whoa Whoa"; 50. "The Ways of a Sophisticate"; "I Wanna be the Man"; 51. "Only Comes Once a Year"; "Underclassman-Flavored Cookies"; 52. "Kotatsu is Peace"; "The Town Knows him as a Ladies Man"
8	August 7, 2015	978-4-06-395445-6	December 29, 2015	978-1-63236-113-4
Sports Test Of Fear; 53. "Valentine's Day Is War"; 54. "Part Time Job? No Prob At Attack Junior High"; 55. "Enter The Hot Blooded Teacher"; 56. "Mr Nile's Family Circumstances"; 57. "The Family Entanglements Episode? Not Good"; 58. "Event Rich Junior High"; 59. "The Show Must Go On"
9	December 9, 2015	978-4-06-395550-7	July 31, 2018	978-1-63236-410-4
60. "Light up Your Passion"; 61. "So What if the Princess is Bulky?"; "It's Only Puberty"; 62. "Stress is the Cause of Countless Ills"; "Forecast: Explosion"; 63. "On a Rainy Day, Play With Your Friends"; "Let Them Eat Popcorn"; 64. "A Boy and His Erasers"; 65. "History Repeats Itself"
10	April 8, 2016	978-4-06-395637-5	July 31, 2018	978-1-63236-410-4
66. "My Classmate Smells Sweet"; 67. "You Can't Beat Pressure"; 68. "Friends Always Share"; 69. "Let it Snow, Let Them Burn"; 70. "The Snow-shoveling Fanciers Club"; 71. "A Day Off is the Time to Try a Change and Maturity Like Nobody's Business"; 72. "Friendship Shines... And Sometimes it Doesn't"; "A Nice Morning, Feels Dreamy"; "A Full-out Dash up the Steps to Adulthood"; "Our Life Path, and What Happens Next!!"
11	August 9, 2016	978-4-06-395721-1	July 31, 2018	978-1-63236-410-4
73. "Dad On a Weekday"; 74. "Confessions of the Perfect Person"; 75. "Wanna Be a Sempai"; 76. "Working Together"; 77. "Goodbyes for the First-Years"; 78. "The Dangerous Man in Glasses"; 79. "Scary Campus Tales! He Who Turns Kids Into Titans"; "Farewell, Attack Junior High!"
High School	August 9, 2018	978-4-06-512329-4		
81. "Graduation"; 82. "The Time of Parting"; 83. "The Reliable Seniors"; 84. "Titan High"; 85. "The Principals' Meeting"; 86. "Forever Our Friendship"

=== Anime ===
An anime television series adaptation was announced in July 2015. The series is directed by Yoshihide Ibata and written by Midori Gotou, with animation by animation studio Production I.G. Yuuko Yahiro provides character designs for the series, and Asami Tachibana composes the show's music although most of the music comes from the first season of the main anime. Kazuhiro Arai from Studio Homare is the series' art director, and Tetsuya Takahashi serves as director of photography. Taeko Hamauzu is the anime's editor and Masafumi Mima serves as sound director. Linked Horizon performs the series' opening theme, "Die Jugend ist ein Feuerwerk" (青春は花火のように, "Seishun wa Hanabi no Yō ni"; lit. "Youth is Like Fireworks"). The ending theme, "Ground of Counterattack" (反撃の大地, "Hangeki no Daichi"), is performed by the voice actors for Eren, Mikasa, and Jean. All cast members from the main anime reprise their roles for Attack on Titan: Junior High. The series premiered on October 4, 2015, and aired on MBS, Tokyo MX, BS11, RKK, and SBS. The anime portion is followed by a live-action segment composed of two parts, "Shingeki! Treasure Hunt" and "Sasha Tries?? By Herself!!"; the former features the voice actors for Eren, Mikasa, Armin, and Bertholdt, and the latter features the voice actress for Sasha alongside a mascot called Titan-kun. The series was licensed in North America by Funimation, and was simulcast on their website. Following Sony's acquisition of Crunchyroll, the series was moved to Crunchyroll. The anime was distributed in the United Kingdom by Anime Limited.

==== Episodes ====
No.	Title	Original release date
1	"Starting School! Titan Junior High School" "Nyūgaku! Kyojin Chūgakkō" (Japanese: 入学！巨人中学校)	October 4, 2015
Eren and Mikasa leave for school, and meet Krista, Ymir, Sasha, Jean, and Connie along the way. Arriving late, they accidentally wander into the Titan's side of the school, where they encounter peril in the form of a rain of titanic school supplies. They are rescued by Hannes, the school janitor, who takes them to the human side, where they learn that Keith Shadis is their teacher. During the entrance ceremony, the Titans arrive and begin to steal the student's lunches; Eren attempts to fight back by attacking the Colossal Titan, but instead falls from the rooftop and has his cheeseburger stolen.
2	"Chasing! Titan Junior High School" "Tsuiseki! Kyojin Chūgakkō" (Japanese: 追跡！巨人中学校)	October 11, 2015
Eren and Mikasa are sent to collect a club admission form from Armin, who has secluded himself at home all winter for fear of the cold. On the way, a Titan attempts to steal their gifts of food, but it is defeated by Levi, who then steals Armin's futon. In an attempt to recover the futon, Eren and his classmates track down the Titan Junior High Scout Regiment, a secret, unapproved club. There they meet Eld, Oluo, Petra, and Günther. Levi arrives with Armin's futon, which he had stolen in order to mend a tear it had developed, and accepts all of them into the club.
3	"Dodgeball! Titan Junior High School" "Tōkyū! Kyojin Chūgakkō" (Japanese: 闘球！巨人中学校)	October 18, 2015
Annie is unable to admit her love of cheeseburgers at lunchtime due to the derision Eren received after admitting to the same thing; due to this, she develops a grudge and vows to defeat him in the next day's dodgeball match. However, when the match rolls around, Eren is late, causing Mikasa to be unable to devote herself to the game. After multiple rounds, only two teams are left: one with Jean, Mikasa, Armin, Marco, Sasha, and Connie; the other with Annie, Reiner, Bertold, Ymir, and Krista. At the last moment, however, Eren arrives, allowing Mikasa to give the game her all, battling to a tie with Annie while everyone else is eliminated. Annie finally admits the reason for her grudge to Eren and they make up, just as Connie finally figures out the rules and gets Annie out. Afterward, Eren, Mikasa, Annie, and Armin have lunch together, and Mikasa becomes jealous when Eren and Annie start to bond over their mutual love of cheeseburgers.
4	"Cleanup! Titan Junior High School" "Seisō! Kyojin Chūgakkō" (Japanese: 清掃！巨人中学校)	October 25, 2015
Eren and the gang are forced to join the Wall Cleanup Club since the Scout Regiment is an unapproved club. There, they are tasked with cleaning windows by Rico. Impressed by their work, she agrees to teach them to use the club's secret equipment, the vertical maneuvering gear. Eren, however fails the test because of an equipment failure. Hannes, the club's advisor, arrives to show him how it is done, but crashes into the wall due to being drunk. This allows Rico to save face by blaming the broken equipment on Hannes. Two Titans then appear, and as the club watches in horror, they graffiti the wall. Rico explains that this is why the Wall Cleanup Club was founded. Outraged, Eren attacks the Titans, only to end up covered in paint.
5	"Studying Hard! Titan Junior High School" "Mōben! Kyojin Chūgakkō" (Japanese: 猛勉！巨人中学校)	November 1, 2015
Sasha and Connie both fail their tests and ask Armin for help. Connie promptly forgets about the study session, but Armin manages to help Sasha with math by using food metaphors. Meanwhile, Eren, Mikasa, and Jean are forced to listen to Oluo brag about his test scores. Hange then arrives and tries to extort money out of them for lunch. When they ask her why she can't afford her own, she shows them the two Titans she is keeping captive, forcing her to use up the biology club's budget as well as her allowance to feed them. Levi takes pity on her and gives her a bag of dog food to feed the Titans, which she then eats herself. Later, when the time comes around for the makeup test, Sasha fails due to fantasizing about food, and Connie fails after he forgets to show up for it. They both are forced to take a remedial class.
6	"Love Letter! Titan Junior High School" "Koibumi! Kyojin Chūgakkō" (Japanese: 恋文！巨人中学校)	November 8, 2015
Jean finds a love letter in his locker and begins to fantasize about who it might be from. Annie approaches him in class, and a similar letter falls from her pocket, but she runs away before he can ask her about it. Later, they find her putting the letter in his locker: when Jean opens it, he finds a message asking him to meet at the park, and runs off. Annie then arrives at the park, and reveals that the letter was not from her, but from a Titan who fell in love with Jean after he gave it food as a distraction while he and Marco fled. Much to his classmates horror, Jean refuses to accept reality, instead convincing himself that the Titan is a normal girl. He soon comes to his senses, however, and rejects her; she smashes him into the ground and runs away, vowing not to give up. Sasha tries to console him by pretending that two pieces of food are girls who want to date him, and he retreats into fantasy. The others go home, leaving Marco to wait for Jean to come to his senses.
7	"Showdown! Titan Junior High School" "Taiketsu! Kyojin Chūgakkō" (Japanese: 対決 ！巨人中学校)	November 15, 2015
When Eren and his friends displease the upperclassmen, they are stuck with cleaning duty. Levi decides to teach them a lesson, challenging them to a contest in the Sports Day games in which the losing grade must clean the Titan's building. The next day, Sasha begins by losing the bread eating race to Hange when the latter uses her captive Titan, Sawney, to win. Jean also loses his game despite using the Omni-directional gear to cheat. The class begins to despair their chances of winning when Mikasa proposes a way to get ahead: defeat the upperclassmen in the shoulder wars match. They almost win, but are defeated by Levi. Hange then floods the entire field with confetti. As Eren and his classmates grumble about having to clean the field, they are joined by Rico and the other upperclassmen, who agree to help them, with the exception of Hange, who runs from an extremely angry Levi.
8	"Spine-chiller! Titan Junior High School" "Kaidan! Kyojin Chūgakkō" (Japanese: 怪談！巨人中学校)	November 22, 2015
Following the events of the previous episode, the Hange and the other upperclassmen challenge Eren's class to a test of courage. That night they arrive at school, where Hange and Levi explain the rules: they must visit the art, music, and science rooms and write their names on the blackboard. The class splits into two groups and heads out, encountering various ghostly apparitions said to be the "Seven Wonders of Attack Junior High"; there is a rumor that anyone who sees all seven will be cursed with misfortune. Finally reaching the gym, they find that the ghosts were in fact a prank orchestrated by the upperclassmen. Erwin Smith, the club's advisor, reveals that one spirit, the woman with black hair who Christa encountered, was in fact a real ghost.
9	"Sweet Summer! Titan Junior High School" "Amanatsu! Kyojin Chūgakkō" (Japanese: 甘夏！巨人中学校)	November 29, 2015
Bertholdt asks out Annie to the summer festival with Reiner, Christa and Ymir. She was not interested but she was forced to join in after her classmates all decided to go.On the rooftop, Reiner tells Bertholdt to tell Annie how he really feels about her. On the day of the summer festival, Reiner puts together three operations in plan to get Annie to fall in love with Bertholdt but fails. On the third operation, shaved ice was almost spilled on Annie but Bertholdt rushes towards her in time to only get himself soaked instead. After he washed himself, he heads towards a die-cutting stall out of interest while the group tries desperately to find him. Only Annie seemed to know where he was and the owner of the die-cutting stall gives Bertholdt two masks as he thought that Bertholdt and Annie were dating. Bertholdt blushes hard and tells him that that was not the case. The two sit on a bench at the area where the entire group was supposed to meet. She does not know what to say to describe Bertholdt when he is with her and she ends up laughing after what Bertholdt commented. Sasha was about to call out to them but Reiner and Ymir hold her back. In the end, Bertholdt seems to confess his feelings towards Annie under the cover of fireworks, and she replies with a 'yes'. Just then, the group hiding and eavesdropping fall out of the bushes and Reiner and Ymir congratulates Bertholdt and Annie. Bertholdt actually asked Annie to go die-cutting with him, much to Reiner and Ymir's disappointment. While they are die-cutting, fireworks appear in the sky and everyone is in awe.
10	"Recommendation! Titan Junior High School" "Suisen! Kyojin Chūgakkō" (Japanese: 推薦！巨人中学校)	December 6, 2015
After a scandal, the president of the student council is ousted and an election is scheduled. Eren, Jean, Reiner, Oluo, Rico, and others all declare their intention of running. When they hear that Ilse Langnar, a member of the newspaper club, may have a notebook that contains the secret to winning the election, they pursue her in an attempt to procure it. Upon finally stealing it, however, they are disappointed to find that it only contains a plan for cleaning the school. When the time comes for the candidates to give their speeches, they all unintentionally alienate the students. However, when Marco attempts to defend Jean, he ends up aweing the audience and being elected president by a large margin.
11	"Clear and Sunny! Titan Junior High School" "Kaisei! Kyojin Chūgakkō" (Japanese: 快晴！巨人中学校)	December 13, 2015
Eren and his classmates decide to run a cheeseburger stand for the school festival. However, upon opening, they find that they have stiff competition from Rico and her kamameshi stand, the winners of the previous year's snack stand contest. Meanwhile, Jean and Marco end up putting on a performance of Snow White almost single handed due to the rest of the class working at the cheeseburger stand. As Rico prepares to unveil the giant pot of rice she has been cooking, Armin comes up with a strategy to lure away her customers; they will start offering double the amount of cheese for the same price. However, just as they begin to enact their plan, the Titans attack and carry off the stands, food and all.
12	"Attack! Titan Junior High School" "Shingeki! Kyojin Chūgakkō" (Japanese: 進撃！巨人中学校)	December 20, 2015
Following the events of the previous episode, Eren vows to get their cheeseburgers back from the Titans, defying the teachers and heading to the Titan's building. Finally making their way to the principal's office, where they believe the cheeseburgers to be located, they find a gigantic key in the center of a small city. As the rest of the class fights to hold off the attacking Titans, Eren carries the key to the keyhole and unlocks it. Inside, they find themselves in what is revealed to be the principal's lunch box, as the Colossal Titan lifts the lid and takes the cheeseburger stand. Enraged, Eren attacks, but is swallowed along with the stand. As his classmates look on in horror, however, the Titan spits him back out, and Eren reveals that he managed to rescue one of the burgers. As the students celebrate their first victory against the Titans, Erwin tells the other faculty that with this victory, human students now have a chance for a happy school life.

== Reception ==
Volume one made it onto The New York Times Manga Best Sellers list for three weeks, debuting at eighth place before rising to fifth.
