= Asami Tachibana =

Japanese composer (born 1987)

Asami Tachibana 橘 麻美
- Born: April 28, 1987 (age 39); Kanagawa Prefecture, Japan
- Genres: Soundtrack; anime song
- Occupations: Composer; arranger; pianist; music producer
- Instruments: Piano
- Years active: 2011–present
- Label: Legendoor

Asami Tachibana (橘 麻美, Tachibana Asami; born April 28, 1987) is a Japanese composer, arranger, pianist, and music producer. She has provided the music for several anime series, television dramas and video games. She is best known for composing the soundtrack for Darling in the Franxx, as well as for co-composing the scores for Seraph of the End and Haikyu!!.

== Biography ==
Tachibana was born in Kanagawa Prefecture. She began playing piano from an early age. Later, she learned other instruments by joining music clubs at school, playing horn in junior high school and double bass in high school. After school, she decided to devote herself to music, studying composition and arrangement diligently.

In 2011, alongside Yutaka Yamada, Tachibana made her debut as a composer in the television series HUNTER - Women After Reward Money. Since then, she has been involved in many soundtrack works, several of which with composer Yuki Hayashi.

== Works ==
=== Anime ===
Year	Title	Note(s)
2012	Robotics;Notes	Other tracks by Yuki Hayashi and Takeshi Abo
2014	Haikyu!!	Other tracks by Yuki Hayashi
2014	Soul Eater Not!	Other tracks by Yuki Hayashi
2014	Gundam Build Fighters Try	Other tracks by Yuki Hayashi
2015	Seraph of the End	Other tracks by Hiroyuki Sawano, Takafumi Wada and Megumi Shiraishi
2015	Aoharu × Machinegun	
2015	Attack on Titan: Junior High	
2015	Seraph of the End: Battle in Nagoya	Other tracks by Hiroyuki Sawano, Takafumi Wada and Megumi Shiraishi
2016	Haikyu!! Season 3	Other tracks by Yuki Hayashi
2018	Darling in the Franxx	
2018	Between the Sky and Sea	
2019	Star Twinkle PreCure	Other tracks by Yuki Hayashi
2019	PreCure Miracle Universe	Other tracks by Yuki Hayashi
2019	Star Twinkle PreCure the Movie: Hoshi no Uta ni Omoi wo Komete	Other tracks by Yuki Hayashi
2020	Haikyu!! To the Top	Other tracks by Yuki Hayashi
2020	Haikyu!! To the Top Part 2	Other tracks by Yuki Hayashi
2020	Moriarty the Patriot	
2021	Moriarty the Patriot Part 2	
2022	Raven of the Inner Palace	
2027	Otherworldly Munchkin: Let's Speedrun the Dungeon with Only 1 HP!	

=== Television dramas ===
Year	Title	Broadcast channel	Note(s)
2011	HUNTER - Women After Reward Money	Kansai Telecasting Corporation	Other tracks by Yutaka Yamada
2013	LINK	Wowow	Other tracks by Hiroyuki Sawano
2013	Hard Nuts!	NHK BS Premium	Other tracks by Takafumi Wada
2014	Kazoku Kari	TBS TV	Other tracks by Yuki Hayashi
2014	Dear Sister	Fuji TV	Other tracks by Megumi Shiraishi, Takashi Ohmama and Jhameel
2016	Fragile	Fuji TV	Other tracks by Yuki Hayashi
2016	Offbeat Chief Police	Fuji TV	
2017	War of Lie	Kansai TV	Other tracks by Yuki Hayashi
2017	Thrill!: Aka no Shō Kuro no Shō	NHK BS Premium	
2017	My Lover's Secret	NTV	Other tracks by Yuki Hayashi
2018	Signal	Kansai TV	Other tracks by Yuki Hayashi
2019	Your Turn to Kill	NTV	Other tracks by Yuki Hayashi
2020	The Secrets	Kansai Telecasting Corporation	Other tracks by Yuki Hayashi
2020	Moyamoya: Asuka to Akai Kingyo	NHK Educational TV	

=== Video games ===
Year	Title	Note(s)
2019	Unknown Future	Other tracks by Yuki Hayashi
2021	Light and Night	Other tracks by Yuki Hayashi
2021	Alchemy Stars	
