= Burnout Syndromes =

Japanese rock band

- Also known as: バーンアウト・シンドロームズ
- Origin: Osaka, Japan
- Genres: Alternative rock; power pop
- Years active: 2005–present
- Label: Epic Records Japan
- Members: Kazuumi Kumagai; Taiyu Ishikawa; Takuya Hirose
- Website: burnoutsyndromes.com

Burnout Syndromes (stylized in all caps when romanized) is a Japanese rock band formed on May 4, 2005, in Osaka. The band consists of guitarist and vocalist Kazuumi Kumagai (熊谷和海), bassist Taiyu Ishikawa (石川大裕), and drummer Takuya Hirose (廣瀬拓哉). They have released two albums by Epic Records Japan and were part of the original soundtrack of the anime Haikyu!! in its second season.

On January 3, 2020, they participated at the online festival Nippon Budokan, organized by Sony Music. On January 31, 2020, the band premiered its single "Phoenix" on YouTube, used as the opening for the TV anime series Haikyu!!.

In 2026, they released "ROCKET," which was used as the opening song for the 3rd season of Dr. Stone.

== Overview ==
In 2005, Ishikawa asked Kazuumi to form a band. They were classmates in junior high school. Later, Hirose joined the band. He was a classmate of Ishikawa in elementary school. Their first goal was to get the attention of the girls at a school festival. However, the festival was canceled due to a flu outbreak. Afterwards, they kept practicing to become good enough to get offers for anime.

In the beginning, their music wasn't popular due to the fact that they only pursued the music that they want to create, but they still became popular after some time. In recent years they have started playing electronic music after learning how to use a sequencer.

The band have written songs for popular anime outside of Japan such as Haikyu!!, Dr. Stone, and Gintama They experiment with genres like techno, ambient, hip-hop, and ethnic in their album material. They also performed the opening song of Super HxEros anime.

== Discography ==
=== Albums ===
==== Studio albums ====
List of studio albums, with selected chart positions
Title	Album details	Peak chart positions	
Title	Album details	JPN Oricon	JPN Billboard
Sekaiichi Utsukushii Sekaiichi Utsukushii Sekai (世界一美しい世界一美しい世界 The Most Beautiful World in the Most Beautiful World in the World)	Released: July 2, 2014; Label: Handmade Music; Formats: CD, digital download	253	—
Bungaku Shōjo (文學少女 Literature Girl)	Released: May 13, 2015; Label: Handmade Music; Formats: CD, digital download	162	—
Lemon (檸檬)	Released: November 9, 2016; Label: Epic Records Japan; Formats: CD, digital download	37	47
Kujaku (孔雀 Peacock)	Released: February 21, 2018; Label: Epic Records Japan; Formats: CD, digital download	31	29
Myojo (明星 Morning Star)	Released: February 20, 2019; Label: Epic Records Japan; Formats: CD, digital download	56	69
Tokyo	Released: June 23, 2021; Label: Epic Records Japan; Formats: CD, digital download	38	42
"—" denotes items which did not chart.

=== Singles ===
List of singles, with selected chart positions
Title	Year	Peak positions		Notes	Album
Title	Year	JPN Oricon	JPN Hot 100	Notes	Album
"Fly High!!"	2016	20	12	2nd OP for the anime Haikyu!! Season 2.	Lemon
"Hikariare" (ヒカリアレ)	2016	46	39	OP for the anime Haikyu!! Season 3.	Lemon
"Hana Ichi Monme" (花一匁)	2018	43	98	1st ED for the anime Gintama. Shirogane no Tamashii-hen.	Kujaku
"Good Morning World!"	2019	29	—	1st OP for the anime Dr. Stone Season 1.	Tokyo
"Phoenix"	2020	17	64	1st OP for the anime Haikyu!! Season 4.	Tokyo
"Blizzard" / "Ginsekai" (Blizzard / 銀世界; "Blizzard / Silver World")	2021	32	—	OPs for the anime Those Snow White Notes.	Tokyo
"—" denotes items which did not chart.

== Accolades ==
Year	Award	Category	Work/Nominee	Result	Ref.
2020	5th Crunchyroll Anime Awards	Best Opening Sequence	"Phoenix" (from anime Haikyu!! Season 4)	Nominated	
