= Alchemy Stars =

2021 mobile game

- Developer: Tourdog Studio
- Publisher: Level Infinite
- Composer: Asami Tachibana
- Platforms: Android, iOS
- Release: WW: 17 June 2021; CHN: 13 June 2023
- Genres: Tactical role-playing, Strategy

Alchemy Stars (Note: Released as Alchemy Stars: Aurora Blast in the North America) was a free-to-play tactical role-playing and strategy mobile game developed by Tourdog Studio and published by Level Infinite. It was released globally on 17 June 2021 for Android and iOS devices, with a Chinese version released on 13 June 2023. The game shut down on 24 January 2025; a limited offline version was made available to existing installations.

== Gameplay ==
A stage in Alchemy Stars. Players create a path of connected tiles to attack enemies.

In the game, players build teams of five characters ("Aurorians"), each associated with one of four elements. In the turn-based combat stages, players guide these characters along paths of as many connected tiles of the same element as possible. Depending on the path length, the characters' attack powers and range can increase. Characters can also activate abilities to influence the battlefield before taking their turn, including changing tile elements, teleporting or healing. Most stages are won when the player successfully eliminates all enemies within a set number of turns. However, some stages' objectives may be different, such as surviving a set number of turns against an endless wave of enemies, or creating a path to a specific tile to exit the map.

Outside of combat, players can build up their base and interact with or level up their characters. On the Colossus, players can increase their affinity with individual Aurorians or gather materials to use to upgrade their stats. In Cloud Gardens, players take control of their Navigator himself on a small, fully 3D map, and can collect materials through minigames such as fishing, chopping wood, and collecting ore to build up their own base.

== Plot ==
Alchemy Stars takes place in Astra, a world different from our own, inhabited by people known as Aurorians who are constantly fighting against evil beings called Eclipsites. Another group, known as the Caelestites, had special abilities that let them fly gigantic sentient airships known as Colossus and had psychic abilities to let them connect with each other. However, one day, a Caelestite named Schummer sold out her home to the Eclipsites in exchange for power, leading nearly all the Caelestites to be massacred.

Players take on the role of the Navigator (named by the player in-game), a survivor of the Caelestite race who has spent roughly 17 years hiding from the Eclipsites in a Colossus named Soroz. When an Aurorian named Vice and her two comrades stumble across the Colossus while fighting off Eclipsites, the Navigator uses his power to help Vice defeat the enemies, and soon finds himself thrust into the middle of a war against the Eclipsites involving several factions of Aurorians with different agendas.

== Development ==
The music for the game was mainly composed by Asami Tachibana. The theme song, "White Midnight" (白夜), was written and performed by the Japanese singer Reol. The game surpassed one million pre-registrations ahead of its release. The game was released in both Japanese and English versions on 17 June 2021.

The global launch of Alchemy Stars was promoted by a giveaway of access to the Crunchyroll anime website and other prizes. Tencent Games also organized an illustration contest on Pixiv, commissioning Shoko Nakagawa and other artists to support the competition.

A Chinese release was announced, with pre-registrations beginning in January 2023. Chinese voice actors were introduced, and a promotional video was released in March 2023. Alchemy Stars officially launched in China on 13 June 2023.

== End of service ==
In November 2024, it was announced that the Chinese release of Alchemy Stars would cease operations on 24 January 2025. Registration for new players and in-app purchases have been disabled. A special offline version of the game will also be made available. Players who have made transactions in the game may receive special gift packs for other games, including Honor of Kings, Peace Elite, Naruto Mobile, Call of Duty: Mobile, and Light and Night Love.

In December 2024, the global version Alchemy Stars was also confirmed to shut down on 24 January 2025. Similar to the Chinese release, a special offline version of the game will be made available, with limited features compared to the original game.

== Reception ==
Hardcore Droid praised Alchemy Star's gameplay and story, but noted that players may find both aspects monotonous. 4Gamers highlighted the game's character designs and Live2D art, though found the gameplay to be weak.

The game surpassed 10 million downloads as of September 2021.
