= Haikyu!! season 4 =

Fourth season of Haikyu!! anime television series

Haikyu!!
- Season 4
- Cover of the fourth season Blu-ray released by Sentai Filmworks
- No. of episodes: 25

Release
- Original network: MBS
- Original release: January 11 – December 19, 2020

Season chronology
- ← Previous; Season 3

The fourth and final season of Haikyu!! anime television series, titled Haikyū!! To the Top (ハイキュー!! TO THE TOP), is produced by Production I.G. and Masako Satō replaced Susumu Mitsunaka as director, with the returning staff from the previous seasons. The season was announced at the Jump Festa '19 event, with a "kickoff event" for the new series being held on September 22, 2019. It adapted the first half of "Tokyo Nationals" (chapters 207–292) story arc from the original manga series of the same name written by Haruichi Furudate. The fourth season premiered on January 11, 2020, on the Super Animeism block. It ran for 25 episodes, with the first cour running weekly from January 11 to April 4, 2020; the second cour was supposed to air in July 2020 but was delayed due to the COVID-19 pandemic. The second cour aired from October 3 to December 19, 2020. Crunchyroll simulcasted the fourth season.

The series uses four pieces of theme music: two opening themes and two ending themes. From episodes 1 through 13, the opening theme is "Phoenix" by Burnout Syndromes while the ending theme is "Kessen Spirit" by CHiCO with HoneyWorks. From episodes 14 through 25, the opening theme is "Toppako" by Super Beaver while the ending theme is "One Day" by Spyair.

== Episodes ==
No. overall	No. in season	Title	Directed by	Written by	Original release date
Part 1
61	1	"Introductions"; Transliteration: "Jiko shōkai" (Japanese: 自己紹介)	Masako Satō	Taku Kishimoto	January 11, 2020
In preparation for Spring Nationals, the boys' measurements are taken, invoking friendly competition amongst the team. Kageyama is invited to the All-Japan Youth Training Camp, while Tsukishima is invited to the first-year only prefecture-wide training camp. In a fit of jealousy, Hinata sneaks into Tsukishima's camp. Despite the initial confusion, Shiratorizawa's coach allows Hinata to attend the camp as a ball boy to test his skills independent of Kageyama.
62	2	"Lost"; Transliteration: "Maigo" (Japanese: 迷子)	Takahiro Ōtsuka	Taku Kishimoto	January 18, 2020
Hinata is lectured after causing trouble by Daichi, Coach Ukai and his teacher Takeda, who tells him, "He who climbs the ladder must begin at the bottom." Back at Shiratorizawa, Hinata observes the practice session as a ball boy. A surprise match against Shiratorizawa's third years and alumni is set up for the camp participants. In between sets, Hinata takes a moment alone in the equipment room. Feeling frustrated, Hinata squishes himself between several mats and asks himself what is he doing; an act that is noticed when Goshiki walks by. He recalls the times he had been scolded and praised by others, of times he has been criticized and given advice, and, as he pulls himself from the mats, comes to the realization that he must change his perspective and thought process in order to find what can he do at the camp.
63	3	"Perspective"; Transliteration: "Shiten" (Japanese: 視点)	Yasushi Muroya	Taku Kishimoto	January 25, 2020
With Coach Ukai's advice in mind to not underestimate what it takes to be a ball boy, Hinata comes out with a clearer mind. He works on receiving the ball in different ways by reading the spikers' form, a skill that he learned in middle school. For personal training, Hinata volunteers to be on the receiving side in an effort to practice his split form. Back at Karasuno High, the boys have a practice match with Tokonami High while they practice their serves, realizing that they prefer to do the penalty whether they win or lose. Kageyama continues his practice at National Youth Camp and subconsciously sets his toss higher than usual. After working on the ball received by the spikers, Hinata is then approached by Tsukishima who asks him to join for the free practice.
64	4	""Taking it Easy""; Transliteration: ""Raku"" (Japanese: "楽")	Hideya Itō	Taku Kishimoto	February 1, 2020
Tsukishima surprises Hinata by joining the blocking practice session. At the National Youth Camp, Kageyama is being the most reserved attendee. Sakusa is curious about the Karasuno-Shiratorizawa qualifying match, and he is challenged by another setter, Atsumu Miya. Back in Shiratorizawa, Tsukishima realizes that he isn't the tallest in the group. He tries to find various tactics to block future spikers in the upcoming national tournament. As a ball boy, Hinata has been observing Kunimi's characteristics. Being the newest and the tallest attendee, Hyakuzawa from Kadokawa High can't keep up with the training. Hinata is able to encourage him by telling him to take things easy.
65	5	"Hunger"; Transliteration: "Kūfuku" (Japanese: 空腹)	Tomoe Makino	Taku Kishimoto	February 8, 2020
As a ball boy, Hinata has been observing each player, mirroring their playing styles and asking numerous questions about volleyball. In Tokyo, Kageyama has been exposed to various positions aside from being a setter and has made acquaintances who he will see at Nationals. Back at Karasuno, the boys have been practicing on their serves. Takeda has been contacting various schools for practice matches before the Spring Tournament. After few days of the training camp, the players depart to head home. The next morning, Kageyama and Hinata reunite. Kageyama is pleasantly surprised that Hinata has been a ball boy at the camp and they both share information about the attendees. The team finds out that Date Tech will be the first school on the list for Karasuno.
66	6	"Enhancements"; Transliteration: "Kōyō" (Japanese: 昂揚)	Masayo Nozaki	Taku Kishimoto	February 15, 2020
On their first day back, the boys practice their serves. Kinoshita is able to float serve while Yamaguchi has yet to master a jump serve. Hinata surprises everyone by being able to receive Kageyama's powerful serve. For personal training, Kageyama coaches Hinata on his jump technique by using Hoshiumi as his reference. Date Tech comes over to Karasuno for a friendly match. The boys face various new challenges from Date Tech's newly evolved "Iron Wall" defense.
67	7	"Return"; Transliteration: "Henkan" (Japanese: 返還)	Hideya Itō	Taku Kishimoto	February 22, 2020
Kageyama has been very quiet and on edge since his return from Tokyo. Hinata manages to ease the tension by reminding Kageyama of his growth since they met. Coach Ukai uses this opportunity to encourage the team to have effective communication. Later, Kageyama experiments while tossing to Tsukishima to break through the "Iron Wall". Seeing this, the rest of the team reflects about how Kageyama must still be concerned about what happened to him in middle school with his previous team. After Kinoshita points out Tsukishima's new spiking point compared to his previous one, Hinata explains on how Tsukishima would hit from the same height during his time of training camp. As both Karasuno and Date Tech scored by the mistakes they committed, Coach Ukai stated that Date Tech will likely to be their toughest opponent in next year.
68	8	"Challenger"; Transliteration: "Charenjā" (Japanese: チャレンジャー)	Tomoe Makino	Taku Kishimoto	February 29, 2020
The practice match against Date Tech is now into the fourth set. Coach Ukai picks on Kinoshita after seeing him avoiding eye contact. Coach Ukai encourages Kinoshita by acknowledging his ability to score but warns him not to pull the vanishing act again. Karasuno continues to employ their newly learned techniques and finds them effective even against the Iron Wall. Ultimately, Asahi breaks through three blockers to clinch the final set, resulting in both teams having 4 wins and 4 losses. As both teams are about to depart, the former players from Date Tech wish the third-years of Karasuno good luck for the upcoming Spring Inter-High Nationals.
69	9	"Everyone's Night"; Transliteration: "Sorezore no yoru" (Japanese: それぞれの夜)	Hiromichi Matano	Taku Kishimoto	March 7, 2020
On the first day of the New Year, Daichi is on edge due to the incoming Spring Inter-High, but a day of spending time with his teammates and friends helps him calm down. The team has arrived in Tokyo for Nationals. After getting some practice in at a local gymnasium, the team settles down at their lodging, where each member handles the last night ahead of the big day in their own way. The day after, Karasuno reunites with Nekoma, Fukurōdani, and other familiar faces at Nationals. As the opening ceremony begins, the Karasuno team walks on to the court and takes their place among the other teams; Hinata and Kageyama feel excited as they have a chance to play in the orange court for the first time.
70	10	"Battle Lines"; Transliteration: "Sensen" (Japanese: 戦線)	Toshiyuki Sone	Taku Kishimoto	March 14, 2020
After the opening ceremony, the team goes to warm up for their first match at another gymnasium. When they return to the official venue, Hinata discovers that he has grabbed the wrong bag and is missing his shoes. Kiyoko goes to retrieve Hinata's lost bag while the team warms up fortheir first match. As Kiyoko runs to the station, she recalls her memories of when she first became the manager and her journey with the volleyball team. Kiyoko returns to the gym just in time ahead of Karasuno's match against Tsubakihara Academy. Just like Coach Ukai expected, the match is very tough. Kageyama is having a hard time adjusting to his surroundings, which has a negative effect on Karasuno's first match against Tsubakihara Academy. The team holds out until Kageyama recalibrates. Yamaguchi is switched in with Hinata as a pinch server and manages to change the momentum for Karasuno. Finally after trial and error, Kageyama and Hinata manage to successfully pull off their quick. The score is currently 13-15 with Tsubakihara in the lead.
71	11	"A Chance to Extend the Rally"; Transliteration: "Tsunagareru chansu" (Japanese: 繋がれるチャンス)	Hitomi Ezoe; Masako Satō	Taku Kishimoto	March 21, 2020
Former Karasuno members appear to cheer on the new team, impressed by their growth. Kageyama, in particular, attracts attention for his superior technique and sharp game sense. Meanwhile, Atsumu Miya observes the match. Tsubakihara perseveres, but just when they seem to have broken through Karasuno's defenses, Hinata manages to keep the ball in play by receiving it with his chest. Asahi follows up with a spike to even the score 18-18. Though Hinata still has trouble finding the right position to receive, his improvements are becoming noticeable to his teammates. Tsubakihara's new player Himekawa is switched in as a pinch server at a crucial moment. Under pressure, Himekawa accidentally underserves the ball into Teradomari's head, allowing Karasuno to win the set. The second set also ends with Karasuno in the lead, 15-14. Himekawa is switched again, but this time he successfully pulls off a ceiling serve. Daichi completely misses the ball because of the gymnasium lights, allowing Tsubakihara to regain some momentum. Karasuno initially struggles with the serve, but they soon adapt and halt Tsubakihara's momentum, making their comeback. The game continues in an intense rally with both teams scoring back and forth. With the score at 23-23, Karasuno makes a miscoordination but Daichi saves it just in time to put his team at match point. For the last play, Sugawara joins the match as the pinch server, aiming to cause a disarray in their opponent's formation. The match ends with a finishing blow from Karasuno's ace, Asahi, and Karasuno moves onto the second round.
72	12	"Vivid"; Transliteration: "Senretsu" (Japanese: 鮮烈)	Hideya Itō	Taku Kishimoto	March 28, 2020
Karasuno has won their first match at the Nationals as the team celebrates. The third years get to catch up with their upperclassmen who are amazed by Karasuno's current first years. While Karasuno eats lunch, they decide to watch Nekoma's first match. Nekoma wins their first match at Nationals and is also moving onto the second round. Meanwhile, Fukurōdani is just starting their first match against Eiwa and Bokuto is already in his "dejected mode". However, the team is well-adapted and once Bokuto regains his composure, he leads Fukurōdani to an overwhelming victory over Eiwa. Hinata and Yamaguchi meet Kourai Hoshiumi, and Hinata and Hoshiumi have a staring competition. Kageyama introduces Hoshiumi, as they met at the National Training Youth Camp. Later, Karasuno watches Hoshiumi's team, Kamomedai, and is amazed by their skill. Hoshiumi shows off his all-rounder prowess, leading the game commentators to call him the "Small Giant". Hinata is inspired by Hoshiumi's playing style. As the first day of the Spring Inter-High comes to a close, Karasuno encounters their rival Nekoma. Daichi and Kuroo remind each other to survive the next day before separating. As Karasuno gets some rest, Tanaka finally gets the chance to talk with his childhood friend, Kanoka Amanai.
73	13	"Day Two"; Transliteration: "Futsuka-me" (Japanese: 2日目)	Yumi Kamakura	Taku Kishimoto	April 4, 2020
Before the second day of Nationals, Karasuno prepares to play against their next opponent, the runner-up of the Inter-High Tournament, Inarizaki High. Coach Ukai briefs the team about the players to look out for, especially Atsumu Miya, who attended the Youth Training Camp with Kageyama. Karasuno quickly realizes that the match will be incredibly tough, but things get worse when they learn that one of Atsumu Miya's teammates is his twin brother, Osamu. As the match draws closer, Tanaka runs into Kanoka to clear up the misunderstanding with her cousin from the night before. The match between Karasuno and Inarizaki begins. Karasuno notices the popularity of their opponents as they step onto the court blown away by the deafening cheers from Inarizaki supporters. Atsumu starts off with a powerful serve, but not before he silences the crowd, as any noise affects his ability to focus. However, when it comes to Karasuno's turn to serve, the Inarizaki cheering squad starts booing their opponents. As the game continues, Hinata manages to jump higher than ever before, but is so caught up with the jump itself that he forgets to spike the ball. Although Hinata receives harsh criticism from Kageyama, the Inarizaki players are surprised and impressed that he would experiment at a time like this and all set their eyes on Hinata.
Part 2
74	14	"Rhythm"; Transliteration: "Rizumu" (Japanese: リズム)	Hitomi Ezoe	Taku Kishimoto	October 3, 2020
The second round of spring high with Inarizaki High School finally started. The Karasuno team is overwhelmed from inside and outside the court with the attacks centered on the strongest twins "Miya Brothers" and the support of Inarizaki High School. Fortunately, Saeko and her taiko drum group arrives in Karasuno's cheer section to change the rhythm of the match. The game continues as Hinata is ready to serve after Aran's serve goes outside. As Ōmimi and Ginjima approach for a quick, Tsukishima and Daichi jump the block up but Ginjima is able to spike past them. Hinata is in position to receive the ball, but bounced off his foot much to his embarrassment. The rally ends with Daichi scoring over the blockers. While the match is going, a flashback of Karasuno's meeting shown that Coach Ukai figured out Atsumu's routine through number of steps when it comes to serves: four steps for a jump float and six for a spike serve. Back in the present where Inarizaki lead by three points in the first set, Karasuno is left stunned as the Miya brothers successfully copy Hinata and Kageyama's freak quick attack.
75	15	"Found"; Transliteration: "Mitsukeru" (Japanese: 見つける)	Rokō Ogiwara	Taku Kishimoto	October 10, 2020
Karasuno is regaining its rhythm with the support of Saeko and others, but Inarizaki gains a momentum after the Miya brothers decided to have an "eccentric haste". Inarizaki lead by four points, with Atsumu performing another float serve. Daichi is able to receive with Nishinoya sending the last hit to Asahi. The ace spikes past a double block but Akagi is able to receive which allows the twins to score once again. As Karasuno struggles to find ways to stop them, Hinata is given an important task with the hope of allowing Karasuno to gain control of the game. With Aran serving, Sugawara pleads the team to stop him at one. Tanaka is able to receive the ball, and Hinata sends an emergency set to Asahi who is about to spike but he tips the ball over the block, a move that makes Bokuto, who is also watching, impressed. Hinata feels excited to be on defense; however his excitement is ended when Yamaguchi takes his place in the service line, but he still encourages him to score ten points. Yamaguchi feels overwhelmed by his nerves and all of the distractions around him, but after receiving support from Shimada, he is able to calm down and serve. Aran attempts to receive the ball but is unable to, giving Karasuno the lead.
76	16	"Broken Heart"; Transliteration: "Shitsuren" (Japanese: 失恋)	Yūji Horiuchi	Taku Kishimoto	October 17, 2020
At the end of the first set, Yamaguchi's service ace also gains a momentum, and Karasuno High School takes the set point in advance. However, Inarizaki begins to aim at Tanaka, who is not in good shape in this game. Tanaka is in an unprecedented predicament. After a few slip ups, Tanaka feels the intense pressure. Questioning his contribution to the team, he tries to push, but Inarizaki's middle blocker seems to be a step ahead. As Karasuno enters another match point after Azumane pulls through on a spike from Tsukishima, Tanaka feels helpless since it was him who actually called for it but was ignored. Just when he is down, Hinata's cheering fires him up and he scores the winning point for Karasuno. As the team celebrates the win for the first set, Kanoka looks at Tanaka with a proud look, and then she remembers him helping her out during childhood, and also says her heart might have been broken.
77	17	"Cats vs Monkeys"; Transliteration: "Neko VS Saru" (Japanese: ネコVSサル)	Pyeon-Gang Ho	Taku Kishimoto	October 24, 2020
In the second round of the tournament, Nekoma High School faces off with Ishikawa Prefecture representative, Sarukawa Technical High School. Whereabouts of the battle between teams that are both proud of their strong defense, in which it becomes apparent that Sarukawa's real plan is not to quickly rack up points but to instead get Kenma to exhaust himself. In the flashback during his first year in Nekoma, Kenma had his abilities lacking and Yamamoto had scolded him many times even during practice. Both get into their altercation due to Kenma's lack of effort and will power to do anything good unless he knows how to use a strategy. However thereafter, Yamamoto begins to realize that Kenma is not fond of losing despite his lack of effort and always sees things through to the end. Back in the match against Sarukawa for the second set, despite the fact that Coach Nekomata has always favored defense, they realize that it might further exhaust Kenma and cause him to make more mistakes. Kenma sends an underhand set to Yamamoto but gets blocked. Seeing their plan works, Coach Shishio and the Sarukawa team are determined to crush Nekoma's brain.
78	18	"Trap"; Transliteration: "Wana" (Japanese: 罠)	Hitomi Ezoe	Taku Kishimoto	October 31, 2020
Nekoma High School is playing a tenacious game against Sarukawa Technical High School. In contrast to the strategy of Itaru Shiramine, who tries to reduce his physical strength and crush the Nekoma's setter Kenma. The second set is at 23-21 in favor of Sarukawa after a mishit from Kai. In able to tie the game, Kenma was about to send the ball to Kuroo but was caught off guard when he sends it to Kai in the opposite end of the court who lands his spike. As both teams continue to demonstrate their endurance and unwillingness to back down, the score eventually reaches 28-28. In the next play, Kuroo gets a one-touch on Wakura's spike and the former spikes to score which puts Nekoma at match point. Fukunaga ends the match with a spike, and Kenma collapses as the team celebrated a victory. Meanwhile, the match between Karasuno and Inarizaki continues with Hinata scoring over Suna and Atsumu. As Nekoma watches the match, Kuroo silently states that Hinata is the one to get Kenma more proactive.
79	19	"The Ultimate Challengers"; Transliteration: "Saikyō no chōsen-sha" (Japanese: 最強の挑戦者)	Pyeon-Gang Ho	Taku Kishimoto	November 7, 2020
The battle between Karasuno High School and Inarizaki High School, which entered the second set, was inferior as Nishinoya was targeted by Miya's serve and made many receive mistakes. As Inarizaki continues to widen the gap with their variety of attacks, Karasuno begins to target one of Inarizaki's players with the hope of turning things around. With Karasuno now having the chance to regain points, Asahi delivers a powerful serve. Though Aran is able to receive it, the power behind the serve causes the ball to head back to Karasuno's side. Osamu gives chase but the ball lands out before he can reach it. However, Suna surprises everyone with a spike that leans further to one side as Tsukihima and Kageyama try to block him. With Ginjima serving, the ball is received and Tanaka scores with a cross shot. In one of the several attacks in this match, Hinata and Kageyama attempt a quick attack and get past Osamu and Ōmimi but Atsumu is able to receive, and Aran is able to counter and score. As he tried to finish the set with serves and aces, Osamu's excessive strength sends the ball fly past the court and gave Karasuno a point. Inarizaki gets the point back after Asahi's net touch where he appeared to shut down Ginjima's spike.
80	20	"Leader"; Transliteration: "Kashira" (Japanese: 頭)	Yūji Horiuchi	Taku Kishimoto	November 14, 2020
Karasuno High School gradually breaks the flow of Inarizaki's dominance with Kageyama's serve. Inarizaki throws in captain Shinsuke Kita to adjust the disturbed rhythm to Karasuno who is gaining momentum. The game continues and Kita delivers the next serve. The ball heads toward the rear and going right between Tanaka and Daichi. Daichi makes the receive and Kageyama is able to get a set to Asahi; it appears to have a block-out but is shocked to see Kita diving and keeping the ball in play. The ball returns to Karasuno's side, when they launch a synchronized attack. Daichi spikes it but Kita saves it again; Ginjima scores to put Inarizaki at 23-15. Karasuno was not able to make earlier plays work, and Kita has gained an overflowing sense of confidence that ensures he will not make mistakes. In a flashback, Kita was revealed that he had learned from grandmother which he stopped caring because he felt that being methodical and thorough just felt nice. While he didn't plan to continue with volleyball after high school, Kita shouldn't overthink small things and should be happy if he wants to. Back in the present, Ginjima is able to land a spike that puts Inarizaki at set point. In the last play of second set, Suna able to get past Tsukishima and Kageyama fails to receive the spike which gives Inarizaki a second set. The third set begins with Atsumu's ace serve, which Nishinoya doesn't even try to save. Asahi successfully ricochets the ball off Osamu for it to land out. Atsumu able to receive after Asahi get past the two blockers; Aran goes to spike but Kageyama is able to stop him, keeping Karasuno in the lead.
81	21	"Hero"; Transliteration: "Hīrō" (Japanese: ヒーロー)	Yumi Kamakura	Taku Kishimoto	November 21, 2020
With the ball going back to Inarizaki's side, Suna approaches to make a quick attack. But Daichi receives the spike perfectly, and Asahi is able to spike past Suna and Osamu. Karasuno, who is struggling with Miya's serve and Rintarō's haste, throws in a pinch server Kinoshita. He serves and the ball heads toward the back area close to Osamu who receives it that allows Aran to spike and score. As he subs out, Kinoshita admits his admiration of the chaotic first years. Although Sugawara tried to comfort him, Kinoshita was upset because he hasn't been able to do anything to help the third years in a match. The game shifted to Hinata who successfully executes a quick attack. Kageyama serving and despite the ball clips the top of the net, he scores with the ball landing before anyone can save it, gaining a momentum for Karasuno. Determined to cause Nishinoya more trauma, Atsumu serves toward the libero. But with Kinoshita's response, Nishinoya is able to do a perfect overhand receive; the team proceeds to do a synchronized attack and Asahi is able to land a spike with Nishinoya pointing out to Kinoshita as the sign of gratitude. Realizing he had his epic moment and being the hero, Kinoshita shares in the celebration. The flashback of junior volleyball class is shown when Miya brothers were fighting each other because Osamu was unable to score with Atsumu's sets. However, in high school, Osamu praises Atsumu for his hardwork which makes the latter love volleyball a bit more. Back in the present, Yamaguchi does a jump float serve and the ball goes back to Karasuno. Asahi is able to spike the ball over but is received by Akagi, and Atsumu stuns everyone with a deep lunge that allows him to make a overhand set to his brother for the kill.
82	22	"Pitons"; Transliteration: "Hāken" (Japanese: ハーケン)	Masako Satō	Taku Kishimoto	November 28, 2020
Inarizaki regains a momentum inspired by the devoted setup of Miya. After a time-out, Riseki serves and Tanaka receives but the ball heads toward the net where Aran appears and lands a direct spike to tie the game at 11. Tsukishima is able to counter and stop Riseki to give the lead back to Karasuno. Ready to use one hundred percent of his power, Asahi unleashes an incredible serve that narrowly lands out. Kageyama sends the set to Tanaka who attempts a cross shot but is completely blocked by Ōmimi that gives Inarizaki a lead. Karasuno starts now to panic, feeling upset about the lead being reversed. For several plays, the two teams continue to attempt to gain the next point. In such an inferiority of Karasuno, a play that changes the flow of the game pops out: Hinata successfully receives the ball on Aran's serve, which leaves Karasuno and the other teams speechless. Kageyama has a silent praise for Hinata who proceeds to do a five player synchronized attack. Atsumu receives Asahi's spike, Osamu sets to Ginjima but his spike is deflected off the block. Hinata chases the ball and makes another miraculous save, sending it to Kageyama. Atsumu scores after sending the ball to the other side of the court which clips the net. After multiple attempts to score that gone to waste, Karasuno starts to feel at a loss. During the time-out, Kageyama bluntly says that he didn't see the receive in which Hinata calls him out by saying he heard the setter compliment his receive. As the team begins to laugh and the tension eases, Osamu watches and understand what his brother means as he sees all of Karasuno seem to have become inspired by Hinata's hunger.
83	23	"The Birth of the Serene King"; Transliteration: "Shizukanaru ō no tanjō" (Japanese: 静かなる王の誕生)	Rokō Ogiwara	Taku Kishimoto	December 5, 2020
Inarizaki leads 18-17 as the team sends captain Shinsuke back in. Karasuno regains a momentum through the efforts of Sawamura and Azumane, but the Miya twins return in kind. Kageyama and Tanaka show off the results of their recent evolutions. Tanaka attempts a cross shot but Ōmimi is able to block him. Fortunately, Nishinoya is able to prevent the ball from landing. Kageyama sets to Hinata and the middle blocker is able to get the ball over but Aran manages to get the ball up. The ball heads toward the net and too low for Atsumu to make a proper set but he is still able to make a set while bending backwards. Kageyama sends the ball to Tanaka who stretches across their side and nears the antenna. Tanaka proves why everyone has a large amount of trust in Kageyama, and he goes for an extreme straight shot that lands right on the sideline. Kageyama scores a service ace as Atsumu tries to recover it. Hinata spikes past the blockers to give Karasuno a match point. After the successful plays from Karasuno, Ginjima scores and puts the game into a deuce again. After several long rallies, Hinata scores an unconventional point, allowing Karasuno to take the lead as the match begins to draw to a close.
84	24	"Monsters' Ball"; Transliteration: "Bakemon-tachi no utage" (Japanese: バケモンたちの宴)	Yumi Kamakura	Taku Kishimoto	December 12, 2020
Kageyama pushes himself to new heights as Hinata shows newfound abilities on the court. As Atsumu gets ready to serve, Daichi encourages the team to make it through this play. The intense rallies continue as Azumane brings Karasuno to break point, but Inarizaki persists. Asahi is able to receive the serve and Kageyama performing a setter dump. When the game passes 30 points, Karasuno begins to lose control of their pacing. Tanaka attempts a spike but Atsumu and Ōmimi block him. Although Kageyama is able to get the ball up, it heads toward the back of the court where Tsukishima makes a desperate dive to reach the ball before it lands out. He is able to narrowly get the ball up but it continues to go out. Daichi is able to reach it in time and get the ball back to Inarizaki's side. In the final play of the match, the Miya brothers attempt a minus tempo quick attack only to get blocked by Hinata and Kageyama, and the ball lands to win the match for Karasuno.
85	25	"The Promised Land"; Transliteration: "Yakusoku no Chi" (Japanese: 約束の地)	Hitomi Ezoe	Taku Kishimoto	December 19, 2020
As the players happily embrace one another to celebrate their victory, Karasuno has officially moved forward into the third round. On the other hand, Inarizaki showed some signs of emotions while the Miya brothers come to realize they fooled around too much during the game. As the Inarizaki players are heading to the sub-arena, the Miya twins attempt to apologize to Kita but the latter prevents them from doing so. Kita responds that they tried to do something which they could've practice beforehand. Meanwhile in the storage room, Karasuno players begin to feel exhausted with few looking to sleep where they are. The teams use the evening to reminisce on their previous games and explore their hopes for future matches. At a hotel, Akaashi follows Bokuto outside and tells the ace about the desire of winning the entire Spring High tournament. In the next day, Karasuno and Nekoma arrive and meet in front of the stadium. Karasuno and Nekoma's long-standing dream, the Battle of the Garbage Dump, is about to begin. In the post-credits scene, Coach Ukai is shown visiting his grandfather Ikkei and having a conversation before the battle between the Garbage Dump finally takes place.
