= Haikyu!! season 3 =

Third season of Haikyu!! anime television series

Haikyu!!
- Season 3
- Cover of the third season DVD released by Sentai Filmworks
- No. of episodes: 10

Release
- Original network: MBS
- Original release: October 8 – December 10, 2016

Season chronology
- ← Previous; Season 2 Next → Season 4

The third season of Haikyu!! anime television series, titled Haikyū!! Karasuno High School vs Shiratorizawa Academy (ハイキュー!! 烏野高校 VS 白鳥沢学園高校, Haikyū!! Karasuno Kōkō VS Shiratorizawa Gakuen Kōkō), is produced by Production I.G. and directed by Susumu Mitsunaka, with Taku Kishimoto handling series composition, Takahiro Kishida providing character designs, and Yuki Hayashi and Asami Tachibana composed the music. It adapted the second half of the "Spring High Preliminary" story arc (chapters 150–207), with the exception of chapters 191–206 from the original manga series of the same name written by Haruichi Furudate. The season aired from October 8 to December 10, 2016. Sentai Filmworks has also licensed the third season.

The opening theme song is "Hikariare" by Burnout Syndromes, while the ending theme song is "Mashi Mashi" by Nico Touches the Walls.

== Episodes ==
No. overall	No. in season	Title	Directed by	Written by	Original release date
51	1	"Greetings"; Transliteration: "Goaisatsu" (Japanese: ごあいさつ)	Hirotaka Mori	Susumu Mitsunaka	October 8, 2016
It's the start of the game against Shiratorizawa, and the starting players of both teams are introduced to the audience and the first match begins with Ushijima scoring a kill off Nishinoya. But the libero is not discouraged, instead is ready to play with his teammates against the left-handed ace.
52	2	"The Threat of "Left""; Transliteration: ""Hidari" no kyōi" (Japanese: "左"の脅威)	Haruo Okuno	Taku Kishimoto	October 15, 2016
The game of Karasuno vs. Shiratorizawa continues, and Shiratorizawa wins the first set easily with a great 25-16. However, the Karasuno team is not discouraged and vows to win the next set. Meanwhile, Akiteru explains to the others the difference between a left-handed spike and a right-handed spike. Hinata calls for the ball and Kageyama sends him the new quick attack, but is suddenly blocked by Tendō Satori who then informs that they have to beat him first if they want to beat Ushijima. Note: This episode is dedicated in memory of Kazunari Tanaka, who died on October 10, 2016.
53	3	"The Guessing Monster" (Japanese: GUESS・MONSTER)	Shintarō Itoga	Taku Kishimoto	October 22, 2016
The score is tied at 3 when Saeko overhears someone behind her call Tendō the 'Guess Monster'. Saeko and Yachi are confused by his nickname, wondering if Tendō may be a cheater. After Ukai advises to cut Shiratorizawa off at the next serve, Tanaka and Hinata notice Kageyama looking very upset. Though he denies it, Kageyama admits to himself that he cannot stand it when a spike from his set is blocked. Takeda questions Tendō's method of blocking and Ukai explains that Tendō uses a type of blocking called Guess Blocking. He relies on reading and intuition to guess where the next attack will be coming from and position himself in time to block. Ukai informs the players that there will be times that Tendō's guesses are wrong but from what they have seen so far that is a rare occurrence.
54	4	"The Halo Around the Moon"; Transliteration: "Tsuki no wa" (Japanese: 月の輪)	Masako Satō	Taku Kishimoto	October 29, 2016
After a barrage of powerful spikes from Ushijima, Karasuno finds a way to slow him down by preventing his cross-court spike. With Tsukishima setting the timing for the three-man block and Nishinoya getting comfortable with Ushijima's spikes, Karasuno comes through with a total defense against the nationally ranked super-ace. Karasuno and Shiratorizawa are having trouble trying to gain two-point leads against the other in the second set. After many tireless rallies Shiratorizawa's setter Kenjirō Shirabu becomes impatient with his toss resulting in a low set-up and a hastened approach from Ushijima. Waiting for this calculated opportunity, Tsukishima creates a temporary opening to bait Ushijima only to sweep his block last-second, closing the opening and stuffing the spike. Tsukishima roars with emotion and triumph, the audience and his team join in the celebration for taking the second set. Tsukishima advises the team that the time to celebrate what he has done is over, saying it was just one point, and the game is just getting started. The team agrees as they prepare themselves for the third set.
55	5	"One vs. Many"; Transliteration: "Ko vs. kazu" (Japanese: 個VS数)	Tetsuaki Watanabe	Taku Kishimoto	November 5, 2016
The third set begins with Daichi serving. Shirabu is quick to set Reon's receive to Ushijima and score. When he repeats the same with Tendō, Kageyama realizes that Shirabu is not letting the loss of the second set get to him and he seems to be more focused than he was before. Shirabu's past life in junior high and the reason for his entering Shiratorizawa are revealed. The third set ends quickly with a win for Shiratorizawa as they regain their momentum. Between sets, Ushijima criticizes Hinata for being unable to make up for his height with good blocking and receiving. Ushijima points out that Hinata cannot fight with height and calls his playing style clumsy, shocking Hinata greatly. As the fourth set begins, both teams maintain an even score as each of their techniques and skills gain points. Hinata manages to block a spike by using a running start to jump higher and begins to shift the momentum of the fourth set in Karasuno's favor. At Hinata's next attempt at a running approach, he goes too far and crashes into the net. Karasuno is leading by one point when Saitō comments how Karasuno likes to attempt risky plays. As the teams catch their breath while staring each other down, Ukai goes over how if one's strengths were determined by an individual's physical abilities, height and power, the game would not be as interesting.
56	6	"The Chemical Change of Encounters"; Transliteration: "Deai no kagaku henka" (Japanese: 出会いの化学変化)	Shintarō Itoga	Susumu Mitsunaka	November 12, 2016
Three years ago, Daichi, Sugawara and Azumane joined Karasuno's volleyball team. After failing to win at the Inter-High Championship, their captain urges them that if they have the chance to win nationals, they need to take it. The fourth set continues between Karasuno and Shiratorizawa, and Karasuno pulls ahead, but then Ushijima manages to find the hole against the defense. Although Karasuno is utilizing new tactics, they also face the fatigue that comes with a longer game. In bringing Karasuno to set point, Tsukishima goes to spike towards the right side. Although his timing was off, he is still able to hit the ball over the net and score. Karasuno team has never been in a five-set match before and the team they are up against has been to nationals numerous times. The score is at deuce when Ushijima surprisingly does a feint shot. Tendō goes onto the court and teases Kageyama for having to face the despair of a deuce as exhausted as he is. Kageyama instead says that the only time he will feel despair is when he is no longer able to play volleyball. In the final play of the fourth set with Karasuno leads 28-27, Kageyama sends the ball to Hinata but becomes fearful when he sees that he sent it short. However, Hinata manages to nudge the ball with his left hand which makes it hard to receive for the opponents and the ball lands to give Karasuno a fourth set and force to a deciding fifth set, much to Hinata's happiness.
57	7	"Obsession"; Transliteration: "Kodawari" (Japanese: こだわり)	Yūsuke Kaneda	Taku Kishimoto	November 19, 2016
The fifth and final set is going to be quick, ending at fifteen points, so Karasuno switches setters from Kageyama to Sugawara to let him rest. Kiyoko tries to calm him down when he is pressured to finally entering the match. Episodes of Satori and Ushijima's lives when they were young are shown. The fifth set begins with Goshiki serving. Tanaka is able to receive the ball, and Sugawara sets to Asahi, scoring the first point of the set for Karasuno. However, Satori is predicting every Sugawara's move, and scores a point successfully. Sugawara follows up with a mix of synchronized attacks, in which he spikes and scores. The match continues as such, but Tsukishima is injured while trying to block Ushijima's spike, and is sent to the infirmary, causing Karasuno to fall behind badly. The team becomes more determined with Daichi, who knows how much pain Tsukishima will take in, encourages the others. As Karasuno does another synchronized attack, a flashback where young Tendō is bullied by other young boys is shown. Sugawara is about to spike, but gets blocked by Satori. Then, it shows a flashback where he blocks one of the boys that were bullying him. As he saw the boy's expression which carries to the current match, Tendō couldn't be more satisfied with one-touch and starts smirking.
58	8	"An Annoying Guy"; Transliteration: "Iya na otoko" (Japanese: 嫌な男)	Hitomi Ezoe	Susumu Mitsunaka	November 26, 2016
To secure the win, Hinata is switched back into the game, and because of his short height, he accidentally uses his cheek to receive the ball, allowing Sugawara to set and him to spike and score a point. This annoys Ushijima greatly, and he resolves to crush Karasuno, especially Hinata. Kageyama is switched back from Sugawara after the successful synchronized attacks, and the power duo pulls off a straight-down hit immediately. Hinata also manages to block Ushijima's spike and score again, but then Hinata is switched out, replaced by Yamaguchi. Shiratorizawa's future ace Goshiki touches the net, so Karasuno gets the point. Narita also works with Kageyama to score, and pulls off a successful attempt, making it a tie between the two schools. Goshiki panics and lets Karasuno take the lead in the meantime, and Hinata is switched back in. However, despite all Karasuno's efforts, Shiratorizawa is at match point. When Daichi turns it into a deuce at 14-14 however, tension begins to rise. As Shiratorizawa scores again, Karasuno begins to deflate. Karasuno's morale is low, but Keishin shouts to the players that volleyball is a sport where they're always have to look in the air and the team morale rises. Karasuno finds Yachi returning with Tsukishima back from the infirmary, and ready to play with them again.
59	9	"The Volleyball Freaks"; Transliteration: "Barē baka-tachi" (Japanese: バレー馬鹿たち)	Shintarō Itoga	Taku Kishimoto	December 3, 2016
Tsukishima is finally back in the game after he injured his right pinky. Daichi speaks to the team of how their size and attacks are smaller and weaker in comparison to Shiratorizawa but it is the reason there are six people on the court. He is sure that their victory will not be the result of a miracle. With both teams having run out of time outs, the next time they step out of the court, one of them is going to be a team of winners while the other will have to taste a bitter defeat. With words of encouragement from his team and the Karasuno supporters, Asahi delivers a powerful serve and is thought to have landed a service ace until it is ultimately called to have landed out. Asahi apologizes to the team for his missed serve, realizing that his footing was slightly off and was the reason the serve landed out. Now Ushijima is up to serve. Like Asahi had, Ushijima does a powerful serve that just misses landing in. Washijo is upset at this, saying a punishment of one hundred serves will be done after the game. It is 20-19 and a match point in favor of Karasuno, Hinata starts the rally with his serve. Yamagata receives and Hinata gets into position only for Kageyama to suddenly switch places with him. Hinata approaches to spike with a minus tempo back attack from the encouragement by Tsukishima.
60	10	"A Battle of Concepts"; Transliteration: "Konseputo no tatakai" (Japanese: コンセプトの戦い)	Tetsuaki Watanabe	Taku Kishimoto	December 10, 2016
As the fifth set on the line, Hinata spikes and the ball hits the blocker's arm of Kawanishi and looks to be landing on Shiratorizawa's side until Ushijima is able to save it. He calls for Shirabu to give him the last hit. Tsukishima and Asahi jump to block and Ushijima spikes, hitting Hinata with such force that he's knocked over. Tanaka sends the last hit to Kageyama before asking Hinata if he was alright. The rally continues: Tsukishima and Hinata are the two most surprised by this and they instantly begin to feel the pressure from the fact that they're facing Ushijima but the rest of the team comes to their aid. Daichi is able to dive and save the receive followed by Asahi attempting to spike the last hit but getting blocked. With the ball heading towards the back, Tanaka saves it and sends it to Kageyama. In mid-air, Hinata sees everything slowed down and he spikes past the blockers. Yamagata is able to save the ball, but it falls to the ground. Karasuno wins the game as they go home with tears of happiness and mixed emotions burst through, and they resolve themselves to win the coming Spring Interhigh tournament. Hinata confidently states that Nekoma will make it and they will play a match that won't be anything like the one at the spring tournament. Takeda announced that Kageyama has been invited to the All Japan Youth Training Camp, with the rest of the team staring at him in shock.
