= Spyair =

Japanese rock band

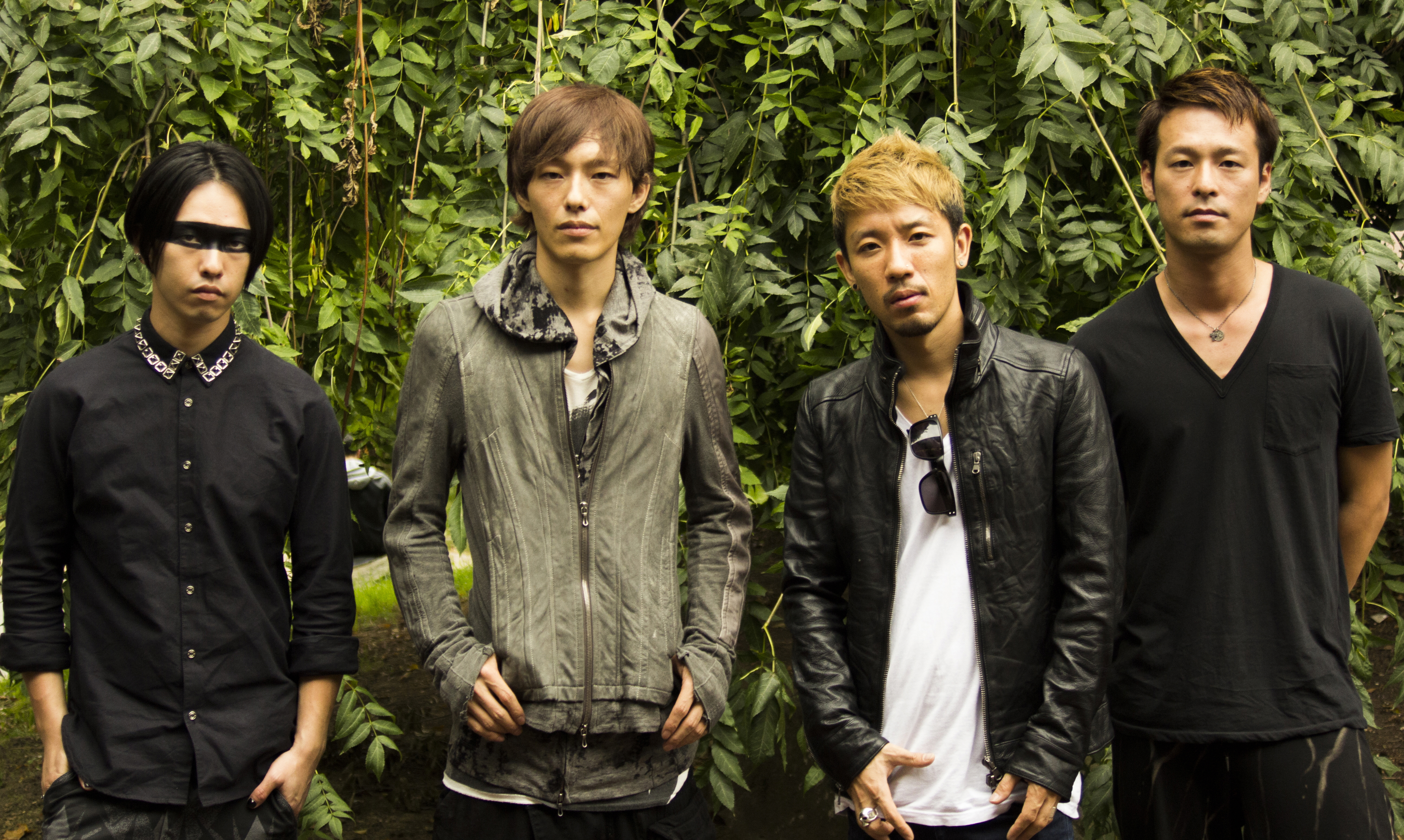
- Spyair in September 2013; Left to right: Momiken, Ike, UZ, Kenta

Background information
- Origin: Nagoya, Japan
- Genres: Alternative rock; power pop; hard rock; electronic rock
- Years active: 2005–present
- Labels: U-Project (former); Sony Music Associated Records (2010–present); JPU Records (Europe)
- Members: UZ (guitar, programming); Momiken (bass guitar, leader); Kenta (drums); Yosuke (vocals)
- Past members: Ike (vocals); Enzel☆ (DJ)
- Website: www.spyair.net

Spyair (stylized in all caps) is a Japanese rock band from Nagoya, formed in 2005. The band consists of Yuji "UZ" Nakai (guitar, programming), Kenji "Momiken" Momiyama (bass guitar, leader), Kenta Sasabe (drums) and Yosuke (vocals). The band's name was determined in one shot by the members, which came from the word spyware, a type of computer virus.

== History ==
The band was formed in 2005 and produced and released a number of materials themselves up until 2009 when they signed with the indie label U-Project. While with U-Project, they released the singles "Japanication" and "Kanjō Discord" before signing a major record deal with Sony Music in 2010. Their major debut single, "Liar," was released on August 11 and was used as the theme song for the drama Hammer Session!. Their second major single, "Last Moment," was released on December 1 and was used as the 25th ending song for the anime Bleach.

Spyair's indies debut single "Japanication" was re-released on March 16, 2011, followed by their fourth major single, "Samurai Heart (Some Like It Hot!!)," on June 8, which was used as the 17th ending song to the anime Gin Tama. In early 2012, the single "My World" was used as the second ending song for Mobile Suit Gundam AGE. The single "0 Game (Love Game)" was used as an official soundtrack for the 2012 film The Amazing Spider-Man in Japan. They also provided the theme song for the second Gin Tama movie, "Genjō Destruction". Their eighth major single "Naked" was released on September 5 and was followed by the announcement of the band's second album, Just Do It, which features 12 tracks including their last three singles.

In October, DJ Enzel☆ announced that he would be leaving the band after their Nippon Budokan concert on December 18. The single "Wendy: It's You" was used as the theme song for the drama Koi Suru Hae Onna, which started airing in November. On December 18, the band successfully held their first live concert at the Nippon Budokan, performing a total of 21 songs including their latest singles. This concert was Enzel's last performance with the group. After the concert, they announced a new single, "Sakura Mitsutsuki," set for release on March 13, 2013. It was used as the 13th opening song for Gin Tama for the month of January.

Spyair's third studio album, Million, was released on August 7. On September 23, it was released by JPU Records in Europe, where the CD only version included three bonus tracks: "Last Moment," "Samurai Heart (Some Like It Hot!!)" and "My World." In October, the single "Just One Life" was used as the first opening song of the anime Samurai Flamenco. Their next single "Imagination" was released on April 30, 2014, and served as the first opening song of the anime Haikyū!!. The single "Firestarter," released on July 22, 2015, was used as the theme song for the drama The Last Cop. In October, Spyair contributed with the first opening song of the second season of Haikyū!!, "I'm a Believer", and a year later, their single "Rage of Dust" was used as the opening song of the second season of Mobile Suit Gundam: Iron-Blooded Orphans.

On March 31, 2022, it was announced that Ike would be leaving the band due to struggles with ulcerative colitis. On April 13, 2023, Ike's replacement was announced to be 24 year old Yosuke.

== Musical style and influences ==
The members of the band have cited their musical influences to be Korn, Linkin Park, and Michael Jackson. SPYAIR combines elements of rock, pop and electronic music.

== Band members ==
Current members

- UZ (中井祐二, Nakai Yuji; born December 13, 1984) – guitar, programming (2005–present)
- Momiken (籾山健二, Momiyama Kenji; born November 14, 1984) – bass guitar, leader (2005–present)
- Kenta (笹部健太, Sasabe Kenta; born March 16, 1985) – drums (2005–present)
- Yosuke – vocals (2023–present)

Former members

- Enzel☆ (岩田洋輔, Iwata Yosuke; born May 11, 1985) – DJ (2009–2012)
- Ike (池田秀文, Ikeda Hidefumi; born April 18, 1984) – vocals (2005–2022)

Timeline

== Discography ==
=== Albums ===
Title	Album details	Peak chart positions		
Title	Album details	JPN Oricon	JPN Hot	KOR Gaon
Alive	Released: September 10, 2008; Label: Self-released; Format: CD	—	—	—
Rockin' the World	Released: September 21, 2011; Label: Sony Music; Formats: CD, digital download	8	8	67
Just Do It	Released: September 19, 2012; Label: Sony Music; Formats: CD, digital download	20	25	44
Million	Released: August 7, 2013; Label: Sony Music, JPU Records; Formats: CD, digital download	2	2	34
Best	Released: November 26, 2014; Label: Sony Music, JPU Records; Formats: CD, digital download	3	6	36
4	Released: November 18, 2015; Label: Sony Music, JPU Records; Formats: CD, digital download	6	7	66
Kingdom	Released: October 11, 2017; Label: Sony Music, JPU Records; Formats: CD, digital download	5	5	61
Unite	Released: March 31, 2021; Label: Sony Music, JPU Records; Formats: CD, digital download	—	9	—
Best of Anime	Released: October 21, 2026; Label: Sony Music; Formats: CD, digital download	33	—	—

=== Singles ===
Title	Year	Peak chart positions			Sales	Certifications	Album
Title	Year	JPN Oricon	JPN Hot	KOR Gaon	Sales	Certifications	Album
"Japanification" (ジャパニケーション)	2009	—	—	—			Non-album singles
"Kanjō Discord" (感情ディスコード)	2009	—	—	—			Non-album singles
"Liar"	2010	55	26	—			Rockin' the World
"Last Moment"	2010	43	95	—			Rockin' the World
"Japanification" (ジャパニケーション) (re-release)	2011	84	—	—			Rockin' the World
"Samurai Heart (Some Like It Hot!!)"	2011	18	40	—	JPN: 250,000+	RIAJ: Platinum (dig.); Platinum (st.)	Rockin' the World
"Beautiful Days"	2011	34	67	—			Rockin' the World
"Movin' On"	2012	—	—	—			Just Do It
"My World"	2012	21	31	—			Just Do It
"0 Game"	2012	15	10	—			Just Do It
"Naked"	2012	47	22	—			Just Do It
"Rock This Way" (with Seamo)	2012	39	52	—			Non-album single
"Wendy 〜It's You〜"	2012	29	26	—			Best
"Sakura Mitsutsuki" (サクラミツツキ)	2013	10	8	—	JPN: 100,000+	RIAJ: Gold (dig.)	Million
"Niji" (虹)	2013	20	24	—			Million
"Genjō Destruction" (現状ディストラクション)	2013	6	5	—	JPN: 100,000+	RIAJ: Gold (dig.)	Million
"Just One Life"	2013	23	15	—			Best
"Imagination" (イマジネーション)	2014	9	3	—	JPN: 100,000+	RIAJ: Platinum (dig.); Gold (st.)	Best
"Rockin' Out"	2015	11	17	50			4
"Firestarter" (ファイアスターター)	2015	18	26	—			4
"I'm a Believer" (アイム・ア・ビリーバー)	2015	9	5	—	JPN: 100,000+	RIAJ: Gold (dig.)	4
"This Is How We Rock"	2016	8	17	59			Kingdom
"Rage of Dust"	2016	10	7	64	JPN: 100,000+	RIAJ: Platinum (dig.)	Kingdom
"Be With"	2017	12	34	55	KOR: 573		Kingdom
"Midnight"	2017	20	65	—			Kingdom
"I Wanna Be..."	2018	26	24	—			Unite
"We'll Never Die"	2018	—	—	—			Unite
"B-the One"	2019	—	—	—			Unite
"Pride of Lions"	2019	—	—	—			Unite
"Inside of Me"	2020	—	—	—			Unite
"One Day"	2020	14	—	—			Unite
"Wadachi" (轍)	2021	4	33	—			Unite
"All I Need"	2021	—	—	—			Best of the Best
"Re-Birth"	2023	—	—	—			Re-Birth
"Orange" (オレンジ)	2024	12	8	—		RIAJ: 2× Platinum (st.)	Re-Birth
"Feel So Good"	2024	—	—	—			Re-Birth
"Ao" (青)	2024	36	—	—			Re-Birth
"Buddy"	2025	—	—	—			Re-Birth
"Chase the Shine"	2025	—	—	—			Re-Birth
"Bring the Beat Back"	2025	—	—	—			Re-Birth
"Kill the Noise"	2026	23	—	—			Re-Birth
"Awake"	2026	—	—	—			Best of Anime

== Music videos ==
Year	Song	Director(s)
2012	"ジャパニケーション" (Japanication)	Takahide Ishii
2012	"0 Game"	Kensaku Kakimoto
2012	"Liar"	Wataru Saito
2012	"Last Moment"	Takuya Tada
2012	"Beautiful Days"	Tatsuya Murakami
2012	"My World"	Tatsuya Murakami
2012	"サムライハート(Some Like It Hot!!)" (Samurai Heart (Some Like It Hot!!))	Tatsuya Murakami
2012	"Naked"	Masakazu Fukatsu
2012	"Wendy ～It's You～"	Masakazu Fukatsu
2012	"Movin' On"	Dan Nishi
2013	"サクラミツツキ" (Sakura Mitsutsuki)	Masakazu Fukatsu
2013	"虹" (Niji, Rainbow)	Masakazu Fukatsu
2013	"現状ディストラクション" (Genjō Destruction)	Masakazu Fukatsu
2013	"Just One Life"	Hideaki Sugawara
2014	"イマジネーション" (Imagination)	Masakazu Fukatsu
2014	"Glory"	Masahiko Tsuruo
2015	"Rockin' Out"	Masakazu Fukatsu
2015	"ファイアスターター" (Firestarter)	Masakazu Fukatsu
2015	"アイム・ア・ビリーバー" (I'm a Believer)	Masakazu Fukatsu
2016	"This is How We Rock"	Wataru Saito
2017	"Be with"	Yamado Yuki
2017	"Midnight"	Masakazu Fukatsu
2018	"I Wanna Be..."	Masakazu Fukatsu

== Awards and nominations ==
Billboard Japan Music Awards

Year	Nominee / work	Award	Result
2012	Spyair	Animation Artist of the Year	Nominated
2013	Spyair	Animation Artist of the Year	Nominated

JpopAsia Music Awards

Year	Nominee / work	Award	Result
2013	"Niji"	Best Single	Nominated
2013	Ike (Spyair)	Best Use of Social Media	Nominated

Neo Awards

Year	Nominee / work	Award	Result
2016	Spyair	Best Musical Act	Nominated

== See also ==
- Japanese rock
