= List of Haikyu!! characters =

The following is a list of characters from Haikyu!!, a manga and anime series created by Haruichi Furudate. The story takes place in Japan and follows the boys' volleyball team of Karasuno High School (烏野高校, Karasuno Kōkō), which is located in Miyagi Prefecture, in the Tōhoku region. Its mascot is a crow, from karasu, and its colors are black and orange. The Karasuno High volleyball team is referred to as the "Flightless Crows" or "Fallen Champs", due to the team's history as a powerhouse that has fallen from grace. They have a long-standing friendly rivalry with Tokyo-based Nekoma High School. Within its own prefecture, Karasuno's main rivals are Aoba Johsai, Date Tech, and Shiratorizawa Academy. Karasuno uses an all-black banner with the word "fly" printed in white. On their journey to restore their school's reputation and qualify for the Japanese national tournament, the players from Karasuno High interact with other teams and form long-lasting relationships along the way.

== Main characters ==
=== Shoyo Hinata ===
Voiced by: Ayumu Murase (Japanese); Bryson Baugus (English)
Played by: Kenta Suga (2015–2018), Kotaro Daigo (2019–present)

Shoyo Hinata (日向 翔陽, Hinata Shōyō) is a first-year student at Karasuno High School and the main protagonist of the series. Despite his short stature, he is inspired to play volleyball at Karasuno after witnessing a player of similar height called the "Little Giant" leading the Karasuno team to a national tournament. After an unsuccessful stint in middle school, Hinata joins the Karasuno team, where he butts heads with fellow first-year setter Tobio Kageyama. Though lacking in technique and general game knowledge, Hinata's speed and vertical jump allow him to act as a decoy to mislead opposing teams, earning him a position on the starting lineup as a middle blocker. Post-timeskip to adulthood found him a member of the MSBY Black Jackals in 2018. During the 2021 Olympics, he was a member of the Japan Men's National Volleyball Team. As of 2022, he is a member of the Asas São Paulo of the Brazil Super League. A distinguishing feature of Hinata is bright, messy orange hair.

=== Tobio Kageyama ===
Voiced by: Kaito Ishikawa (Japanese); Scott Gibbs (English)
Played by: Tatsunari Kimura (2015–2017), Tatsuya Kageyama (2017–2018), Ryunosuke Akana (2019–present)

Tobio Kageyama (影山 飛雄, Kageyama Tobio) is a first-year student at Karasuno High School. Though an exceptionally diligent and strategic setter, his ruthless desire to win and his authoritarian leadership style had put him at odds with his volleyball teammates in middle school, earning him the pejorative nickname "King of the Court". Despite his hostile relationship with Shoyo Hinata, the two form an unusual setter-spiker partnership that earns them notoriety in their prefecture. Regarded by others as a "volleyball genius", Kageyama is famous for his pinpoint accuracy when setting, as well as his ability to utilize his spikers to their maximum potential. With his and Hinata's skills combined, they formed a special "quick attack" that outwitted many opponents. Off the court, Kageyama is typically polite and has good intentions but has poor social skills and difficulty expressing himself. Post-timeskip to 2018, he became a member of the Schweiden Adlers. As of 2021, he's a current member of Ali Roma in Italy's Serie A. He is a member of the Japan Men's Volleyball Team.

=== Kei Tsukishima ===
Voiced by: Kōki Uchiyama, Tomo Muranaka (young) (Japanese); Leraldo Anzaldua (English)
Played by: Ryotaro Kosaka (2015–2018), Ryosuke Yamamoto (2019–present)

Kei Tsukishima (月島 蛍, Tsukishima Kei) is a first-year student at Karasuno High School and the volleyball team's tallest player. A middle blocker, he is known for his calm and clever blocking style by which he quickly analyzes and reacts to opponents' plays. His condescending attitude and tendency to make snide remarks puts him at odds with both his own teammates (particularly Kageyama and Hinata) as well as members of opposing teams. Despite being a key member of Karasuno's defense, Tsukishima struggles due to his lack of devotion to the sport and inability to understand why others are so invested. His closest friend is fellow first-year student Tadashi Yamaguchi, who refers to him by the nickname "Tsukki". Post-timeskip, he is a college student and plays as middle blocker for the Sendai Frogs.

=== Tadashi Yamaguchi ===
Voiced by: Soma Saito, Hiro Nakajima (young) (Japanese); Cameron Bautsch (English)
Played by: Kairi Miura (2015–2018), Yoshinari Oribe (2019–present)

Tadashi Yamaguchi (山口 忠, Yamaguchi Tadashi) is a first-year student at Karasuno High School. The only first-year on the team not to make the starting lineup, Yamaguchi serves as a backup middle blocker as well as a serving specialist due to his adoption of the float serve technique. Though generally friendly and good-mannered, he sometimes teases his teammates, due to his close friendship with Kei Tsukishima. Yamaguchi appears to idolize Tsukishima, which stems from Tsukishima scaring off bullies when they were children. A running gag in the series involves Yamaguchi defending or complimenting Tsukishima, Tsukishima telling him to shut up, and Yamaguchi apologizing. Post-timeskip, he is a college student and plans to work for an electronics company.

=== Daichi Sawamura ===
Voiced by: Satoshi Hino (Japanese); Justin Doran (English)
Played by: Keita Tanaka (2015, 2018), Kentaro Akisawa (2016–2017), Sho Higano (2019–present)

Daichi Sawamura (澤村 大地, Sawamura Daichi) is the captain of the volleyball team and a third-year student at Karasuno High School. A wing spiker and dependable receiver, he functions as one of the team's defensive pillars. He is a resilient and kind leader who encourages the team both on and off the court. Though Daichi is usually friendly and approachable, he occasionally adopts a "scary" demeanor when disciplining his team, terrifying his teammates. He is close friends with Kōshi Sugawara and Asahi Azumane, having joined the volleyball team with them as first-years. Post-timeskip, he works as a policeman for the Miyagi Prefectural Police.

=== Koushi Sugawara ===
Voiced by: Miyu Irino (Japanese); Adam Gibbs (English)
Played by: Hiroki Ino (2015–2017), Naoki Tanaka (2018), Ryu Ichinose (2019–present)

Kōshi Sugawara (菅原 孝支, Sugawara Kōshi) is the vice captain of the volleyball team and a third-year student at Karasuno High School. Sugawara acts like the team's mother figure and looks after the juniors. Sugawara has a positive mindset and is also nicknamed "Mr Refreshing" by Oikawa. Originally the teams starting setter, he was replaced by the first year genius setter, Tobio Kageyama. Despite this, he holds no hard feelings toward Kageyama and remains supportive of both him and the rest of the team. Sugawara is very supportive of the team and is put into a game when the team morale is low as he is good at lifting spirits and predicting opponents' gameplays. Post-timeskip, he works as an elementary school teacher.

=== Asahi Azumane ===
Voiced by: Yoshimasa Hosoya (Japanese); Orlanders Jones (English)
Played by: Justin Tomimori (2015–2018), Yuya Fukuda (2019–present)

Asahi Azumane (東峰 旭, Azumane Asahi) is a third-year student at Karasuno and a wing spiker. Known as Samurai Man. Physically the strongest member of the team, he is considered the "ace" of the volleyball team. Though mild-mannered and timid, his stature, strength, and long hair make him appear older and more intimidating than he is, leading players from other teams to speculate that he is in fact a grown man who has been held back. Post-timeskip, he works as an apparel designer in Tokyo.

=== Yū Nishinoya ===
Voiced by: Nobuhiko Okamoto (Japanese); Greg Ayres (English)
Played by: Shohei Hashimoto (2015–2017), Yuto Fuchino (2017–2018), Yuma Kitazawa (2019–present)

Yū Nishinoya (西谷 夕, Nishinoya Yū) is a second-year student at Karasuno High School and the team's libero and defensive specialist. Along with Tobio Kageyama, he is considered one of Karasuno's two prodigies, having won the prefecture's award as "Best Libero" during junior high. The shortest player on the team, Nishinoya is loud, energetic, and deeply passionate about his position as libero. He is often seen with Ryūnosuke Tanaka, both of whom are regularly disciplined for their antics. Post-timeskip, he is seen to be traveling around the world.

=== Ryūnosuke Tanaka ===
Voiced by: Yū Hayashi (Japanese); Greg Cote (English)
Played by: Kouhei Shiota (2015–2018), Ko Kanegae (2019–present)

Ryūnosuke Tanaka (田中 龍之介, Tanaka Ryūnosuke) is a second-year student at Karasuno High School and a wing spiker. He is loud, fierce, and aggressive, but deeply respects his seniors and looks out for the first-years. He is known for his tendency to pick fights with other players who disrespect Karasuno, which results in him being disciplined by Daichi or Sugawara. He harbors feelings for the team's manager, Kiyoko Shimizu. Post-timeskip, he works as a personal trainer and is married to Kiyoko Shimizu.

=== Chikara Ennoshita ===
Voiced by: Toshiki Masuda (Japanese); Adam Noble (English)
Played by: Kazuma Kawahara (2015–2018), Yushin Nakatani (2019–present)

Chikara Ennoshita (縁下 力, Ennoshita Chikara) is a second-year student at Karasuno High School and a wing spiker. Though not a starting player, Ennoshita displays leadership skills to the point that he is made team captain after Daichi graduates. He once ditched volleyball practice for a few months in high school, but then came back to volleyball after missing it. Post-timeskip, he works as physical therapist.

=== Hisashi Kinoshita ===
Voiced by: Nobuyori Sagara (Japanese); Blake Shepard (English)
Played by: Sean Osada (2019–present)

Hisashi Kinoshita (木下 久志, Kinoshita Hisashi) is a second-year student at Karasuno High School and a wing spiker. He is not part of the starting lineup. Post-timeskip, he works for a train company.

=== Kazuhito Narita ===
Voiced by: Kōtarō Nishiyama (Japanese); Gabriel Regojo (English)

Kazuhito Narita (成田 一仁, Narita Kazuhito) is a second-year student at Karasuno High School and a middle blocker. He is not part of the starting lineup. Post-timeskip, he works in a reality firm.

=== Kiyoko Shimizu ===
Voiced by: Kaori Nazuka (Japanese); Rebekah Stevens (English)
Played by: Shizune Nagao (2017–2018), Satomi Ohkubo (2019–present)

Kiyoko Shimizu (清水 潔子, Shimizu Kiyoko) is a third-year student and the head manager of Karasuno's volleyball club. Formerly a track-and-field club member, she agrees to manage the volleyball team at Daichi's request. Though aloof and quiet, she cares deeply about the team and its success. Her physical attractiveness results in unwanted advances from members of opposing teams and makes her the target of Nishinoya and Tanaka's unyielding affection. Post-timeskip, she works at a sports store and is married to Ryūnosuke Tanaka.

=== Hitoka Yachi ===
Voiced by: Sumire Morohoshi (Japanese); Brittney Karbowski (English)
Played by: Ami Saito (2017–2018), Julie Yamamoto (2019–present)

Hitoka Yachi (谷地 仁花, Yachi Hitoka) is a first-year student and the assistant manager of Karasuno's volleyball club. Kiyoko recruits her to take over managing the team after she graduates. Extremely anxious and shy, Yachi routinely overthinks her interactions with the team, but serves as a strong pillar of support. Post-timeskip, she is a college student and plans to work at an advertising design company.

=== Ittetsu Takeda ===
Voiced by: Hiroshi Kamiya (Japanese); Gareth West (English)
Played by: Shige Uchida (2015–2018), Kenta Kamakari (2019–present)

Ittetsu Takeda (武田 一鉄, Takeda Ittetsu) is the Japanese literature teacher at Karasuno and the faculty advisor of the volleyball team. While he has no experience with volleyball, he takes notes about everything he learns and supports the team to the fullest. Enthusiastic and persistent, he pesters Karasuno alumnus Keishin Ukai for weeks until he agrees to coach the team.

=== Keishin Ukai ===
Voiced by: Kazunari Tanaka (seasons 1–3 episode 8) [He was voiced by Tanaka in seasons 1–3 until 10 October 2016 when Tanaka died from a brain stem hemorrhage.], Hisao Egawa (season 3 episode 9 onwards) (Japanese); David Wald (English)
Played by: Tsuyoshi Hayashi (2015–2018), Ken Ogasawara (2019–present)

Keishin Ukai (烏養 繫心, Ukai Keishin) is a Karasuno volleyball team alumnus and the coach of the Karasuno volleyball team. The grandson of Karasuno's previous coach Ukai Sr., he initially refuses to be the team's coach until he witnesses the players' potential during a practice match, which also impresses him because of Hinata and Kageyama's quick attack. While not coaching, Ukai works at his family's convenience store, which the volleyball team frequents.

== Characters from rival schools ==
=== Aoba Johsai High School ===
Aoba Johsai High (青葉城西高校, Aoba Jōsai Kōkō), also called Seijoh (青城, Seijō) for short, is a private high school located in Miyagi Prefecture. It is a powerhouse school whose boys' volleyball team ranks in the top four in the prefecture. They are known for their strategic yet aggressive playstyle. According to Coach Keishin Ukai, they are a worthy match for Karasuno, calling them Karasuno's "arch-enemy" within Miyagi. They are a powerful and balanced team whose individual players are noted to be strong enough to become the aces of any other team, had they not joined Aoba Johsai. Many of its players are graduates from Kitagawa Daiichi Junior High. In recent years, Aoba Johsai has been consistently qualifying for the finals of both the Interhigh and Spring High tournaments, but are always defeated by Shiratorizawa. They are bolstered by their captain, Tōru Oikawa, a talented setter able to draw out each player's full potential on the court. Their team colours are white and turquoise, and their banner says "Rule the Court".

==== Tohru Oikawa ====
Voiced by: Daisuke Namikawa (Japanese); Chris Patton (Seasons 1–4) (English)

Tōru Oikawa (及川 徹, Oikawa Tōru) is a third-year student at Aoba Johsai High. He is the volleyball team's captain and starting setter. He is introduced as one of Haikyu!!'s main antagonists. Despite his popularity, flirtatious nature, and childishness, Oikawa is a hard worker and takes volleyball extremely seriously. Oikawa sees Kageyama Tobio as a rival therefore he frequently overworked himself, making Iwaizumi Hajime (his best friend) force him to rest and recover. Oikawa's favourite food is milk bread and his motto is "if you hit it, hit it until it breaks". After the time skip, Oikawa is a member of CA San Juan S (Argentinian league), and, having gained Argentinian citizenship, plays for the Argentinian national team against Japan.

==== Issei Matsukawa ====
Voiced by: Isamu Yūsen (Japanese); Paul Locklear (English)

Issei Matsukawa (松川 一静, Matsukawa Issei) is a third-year student and a middle blocker. He is cool-headed and often jokes around despite his serious demeanor. He shares a very close bond with the third-years, especially Hanamaki, whom he is almost always with. The two are shown to be swapping jerseys on more than one occasion. Both enjoy observing Oikawa's endless teasing of Iwaizumi and Iwaizumi's retaliation, and Matsukawa often chimes in with his own teasing remarks. After the timeskip, "Mattsun" (a nickname given to Matsukawa by the other third-years of Seijoh) works at a funeral home.

==== Takahiro Hanamaki ====
Voiced by: Tōru Sakurai (Japanese); Jack Ivy (English)

Takahiro Hanamaki (花巻 貴大, Hanamaki Takahiro) is a third-year student and a wing spiker. He is a calm and perceptive player, able to read the game situation quite well, and is usually quiet during games. Despite this, he does have a sense of humor and gets along well with the other team members. He is seen flashing the peace sign when Tōru Oikawa compliments him. He shares a very close bond with the third year, especially Matsukawa, with whom he trades jerseys and is almost always with. Most people use the nickname "Makki" instead of saying his full name.

==== Hajime Iwaizumi ====
Voiced by: Hiroyuki Yoshino (Japanese); Benjamin McLaughlin (English)

Hajime Iwaizumi (岩泉 一, Iwaizumi Hajime) is a third-year student and a wing spiker. He is the team's ace and vice-captain. Iwaizumi is a stern but reliable teammate. He is known for his powerful spikes and on-the-spot plays with Tōru Oikawa, who nicknames him "Iwa-chan". He is mature, a good sport, and physically strong. He is kind and supportive of everyone, including Tobio Kageyama, in spite of his poor relationship with Oikawa. He often resorts to violence with Oikawa whenever he is provoked; however, Iwaizumi cares immensely for Oikawa and believes in his value as both a player and a person. He keeps Oikawa in check and prevents him from indulging in unhealthy behaviours, preventing him from overworking himself and grounding him when he is insecure or childish. Because of his talent and firm-yet-caring attitude, he is looked up to as a leader and is highly respected on the team. After the timeskip, he is an athletic trainer. He also coaches the Japanese National Team (consisting of Hinata, Kageyama, Ushijima, Sakusa, etc.)

==== Shigeru Yahaba ====
Voiced by: Kengo Kawanishi (Japanese); Jeremy Gee (English)

Shigeru Yahaba (矢巾 秀, Yahaba Shigeru) is a second-year and a setter. He is a show-off by nature. He does not like Kyotani, who had stopped coming to practice, but who was still chosen as a regular. He is the only person on the team who scolds Kyotani to his face for being a risky, selfish player and for jeopardizing the third-years' final chance of making it to the Nationals.

==== Shinji Watari ====
Voiced by: Arthur Lounsbery (Japanese); Blake Jackson (English)

Shinji Watari (渡 親治, Watari Shinji) is a second-year student and the team's libero. He seems to enjoy being challenged, as he smiled when Yū Nishinoya copied his back row set. It is shown that he can be very gentle and supportive when he tries to cheer up Kyōtani after the latter misses a point, despite Kyōtani's poor relationship with the rest of the team. He was previously a setter, though it is unknown if he ever played as a setter for Aoba Jōsai.

==== Yūtarō Kindaichi ====
Voiced by: Makoto Furukawa (Japanese); David Matranga (English)

Yūtarō Kindaichi (金田一 勇太郎, Kindaichi Yūtarō) is a first-year and a middle blocker. He was Tobio Kageyama's former teammate at Kitagawa Daiichi Junior High. He is called "Turnip Head" by Shoyo Hinata and Ryūnosuke Tanaka. As a victim of Kageyama's previous aggressions, he and Kunimi were the ones who asked their coach to bench Kageyama. Though he claims to not care about what happened to Kageyama, it is evident that he feels guilty after seeing how Kageyama had mellowed out and even bonded with his new team in high school. Upon witnessing Kageyama's surprisingly healthy relationship with Karasuno, Kindaichi is left feeling somewhat defeated, which Kunimi chastises him for. He questions Hinata about Kageyama's welfare; to Kageyama himself, however, he merely reminds him that they are not (and never were) friends and states that there is "no one [he] wants to crush more than [him]". He is close friends with Kunimi, and he highly respects Iwaizumi and Tōru Oikawa, having known all three from Kitagawa Daiichi.

==== Akira Kunimi ====
Voiced by: Atsushi Tamaru (Japanese); Mark X. Laskowski (English)

Akira Kunimi (国見 英, Kunimi Akira) is a first-year and a wing spiker. He was Tobio Kageyama's former teammate at Kitagawa Daiichi Junior High. He is also known as "Curtain Hair". He has an indifferent and lazy personality and usually does not play to his utmost, which Kageyama repeatedly scolds him for. In contrast, Tōru Oikawa permits and even praises him for his style of play, which allows him to conserve his energy for the latter half of the game when everyone else is exhausted, giving him greater chances of scoring and making him a reliable player. He dislikes being told to "go all out" and occasionally skips practice. He is quiet and does not like loud, energetic people. Kageyama noted that he never smiled when they played together for Kitagawa Daiichi, but notices that Kunimi smiles and even celebrates during games in high school; this makes Kageyama feel inferior to Oikawa, who seemingly brings out the best in everyone. Kunimi is close friends with Kindaichi, whom he often slaps for feeling guilty about their history with Kageyama.

==== Kentarō Kyōtani ====
Voiced by: Shunsuke Takeuchi (Japanese); Michael Wronski (English)

Kentarō Kyōtani (京谷 賢太郎, Kyōtani Kentarō) is a second-year wing spiker, nicknamed "kyōken-chan" ("Mad Dog") by Tōru Oikawa, a play on the first part of his name and describing his unpredictable behaviour. He is described by Coach Keishin Ukai as a double-edged sword because, despite his powerful jumps, spikes, and speed, his playstyle is reckless, as he spikes the ball at 100% power every time without checking if he might be blocked first. He is aggressive and rarely speaks with his teammates, often barging into them and spiking sets that were not meant for him, and getting angry when he is used as a decoy, even when the ploy is successful. He has no teamwork skills and, with the exception of Iwaizumi, does not respect the third-years, which angers the first- and second-years. He stopped coming to practice but returned after the first tournament, thinking that the third-years may have retired by then. Despite his rough personality, he is a strong player, and his middle school team is known to have been strong only during the years he played. He also has great body control, jump serves, and dexterity, being able to spike with either hand. Though he only listens to Iwaizumi, whom he challenged but lost to in various athletic contests, Oikawa is the only one who can actually put him to good use in the game. He mellows slightly when Yahaba angrily reprimands him for being reckless and asks him to be a team player.

=== Nekoma High School ===
Nekoma High (音駒高校, Nekoma Kōkō) is located in Nerima Ward of Tokyo. The word neko in their name means 'cat' in Japanese, thus they are always represented as a cat, which is the "natural enemy" of the crow (Karasuno). They have an ongoing friendly rivalry with Karasuno. Their coach, Yasufumi Nekomata, and Karasuno's coach, Keishin Ukai, are good friends and want to make the "Battle of the Trash Heap", as an official match between their teams, happen. As a team, Nekoma is known for its players' chemistry, strong floor defense, and receives. They utilize strategies developed by Kenma, their quiet but intelligent setter known as the "brain" of the team. Nekoma's banner is red and says "Connect"; their uniforms are red and black. Their pre-game ritual is a speech by their captain, Kuroo, who uses a metaphor to remind the team that they are like "blood", and must connect and continue flowing to circulate oxygen and keep their minds working.

==== Tetsurō Kuroo ====
Voiced by: Yūichi Nakamura (Japanese); Ty Mahany (English)

Tetsurō Kuroo (黒尾 鉄朗, Kuroo Tetsurō) is a third-year student at Nekoma. He is the captain of the volleyball club and a talented middle blocker known for his "read blocks". Kuroo is a playful and sly person, in contrast with Kenma, Nekoma's setter, and his childhood friend. He is nicknamed the "scheming captain" because he is a clever strategist; he is also considered a "provocation expert" because he enjoys teasing people lightheartedly. Despite his teasing, he is shown to be kind and thoughtful and gives priority to good sportsmanship. During a training camp, he gives advice to Kei Tsukishima about blocking after inviting him to practice with him after hours, as he wants Karasuno to qualify for Nationals in order to fulfill Coach Nekomata's dreams. Post-timeskip, Kuroo works at the Japan Volleyball Association within the Sports Promotion division.

==== Nobuyuki Kai ====
Voiced by: Takanori Hoshino (Japanese); Joel McCray (English)

Nobuyuki Kai (海 信行, Kai Nobuyuki) is a third-year student at Nekoma High. He is the vice-captain and wing spiker for the volleyball team. He is a well-rounded player who is good at both spiking and receiving. Kai has a calm and pleasant disposition and is good friends with Yaku and Kuroo.

==== Morisuke Yaku ====
Voiced by: Shinnosuke Tachibana (Japanese); Jason Duga (English)

Morisuke Yaku (夜久 衛輔, Yaku Morisuke) is a third-year student at Nekoma High and one of the team's liberos. He is known for being a very skilled libero and is praised by both Yū Nishinoya and Tobio Kageyama for his receiving skills. He acts like a mother hen to his teammates. He becomes hostile when someone (usually Lev) mentions how short he is, earning him the nickname "the demon senpai". Post-timeskip, Yaku plays for Tigr Ekaterinburg in the Russian Volleyball Super League and for the Japanese national team.

==== Taketora Yamamoto ====
Voiced by: Seigo Yokota (Japanese); Andrew Love (English)

Taketora Yamamoto (山本 猛虎, Yamamoto Taketora) is a second-year student at Nekoma High. He is a wing spiker and the ace of Nekoma's volleyball team. Like Ryūnosuke Tanaka, he has a tendency to lash out and provoke the other team, and getting reprimanded by Yaku. He initially clashed with Kenma during their first year as teammates due to their contrasting personalities but became friends after encouraging one another. He too is a fan of Kiyoko Shimizu, though he has bad luck with girls. Currently, he plays for VC Kanagawa in Japan's V.League, along with Inarizaki's Heisuke Riseki and Shinzen's Eikichi Chigaya.

==== Kenma Kozume ====
Voiced by: Yuki Kaji (Japanese); Clint Bickham (English)

Kenma Kozume (孤爪 研磨, Kozume Kenma) is a second-year student at Nekoma High and the team's setter. He is introverted and prefers to keep to himself, choosing to play video games instead of interacting with others. Because he is so quiet, he does not stand out and is often overlooked by opponents. However, Kenma is vital to Nekoma's playmaking and is considered the "backbone", "brain", and "heart" of the team, which Kuroo alludes to in his pre-game speech. He is uncomfortable around people and, as a result, became very observant of others. Thus, he is able to read opponents well and develop strategies to counter the opposite team; hence his nickname as the team's "brain". He is very close to Kuroo, his childhood friend who introduced him to the sport. He also became good friends with Shoyo Hinata, whom he met by chance when Kenma got lost before their first official practice match, though Hinata was unaware that he was from Nekoma at the time. He and Hinata text often, revealing that despite their opposite personalities, they are still good friends. Post-timeskip, Kenma is the CEO (of a sports company, Bouncing Ball corp.) and sponsors Hinata. He is also a pro gamer, stock trader, and YouTuber, known as Kodzuken.

==== Shōhei Fukunaga ====
Voiced by: Shōta Chōnan (Seasons 1–4), Ryūichi Sawada (2024–present) (Japanese); Matthew Carter (Season 1), Courtland Johnson (Season 2), Jeran Ugokwe (Season 4 and OVAs–present) (English)

Shōhei Fukunaga (福永 招平, Fukunaga Shōhei) is a second-year student at Nekoma High and a wing spiker for the volleyball team. He has a very silent nature and rarely speaks. However, he seems to have silently befriended the other second-years (Tora and Kenma) as the three get along very well throughout the series and after the timeskip, when he works as a comedian and a part-time chef whose cooking is highly praised by Kenma (in the manga).

==== Sō Inuoka ====
Voiced by: Kyōsuke Ikeda (Japanese); Joe Daniels (English)

Sō Inuoka (犬岡 走, Inuoka Sō) is a first-year at Nekoma High and a middle blocker. Like Shoyo Hinata, he has an excitable and positive personality, and they get along well. He is the first player able to counter Hinata and Tobio Kageyama's freakish quickness. He is tall and often excited, genuinely praising Hinata for being able to adapt to their quick shots being blocked. He becomes good friends with Hinata, even though they are technically rivals, and they often communicate using sound effects that no one else understands. After the timeskip, he works as a childcare professional.

==== Lev Haiba ====
Voiced by: Mark Ishii (Japanese); Mike Yager (English)

Lev Haiba (灰羽 リエーフ, Haiba Riēfu) is a first-year at Nekoma High and a middle blocker. He is the tallest member of the team and is half-Japanese and half-Russian, though he only speaks Japanese. Lev has a happy-go-lucky and cheerful personality. He has no prior experience with volleyball and therefore was not present at Nekoma and Karasuno's first practice match. Like Shoyo Hinata, he also aspires to be the ace of the team, though he is still working on practicing his fundamental skills. Kenma was tasked by their coach to "take care of Lev", and thus the two often practice together in order to improve Lev's skills, though Kenma is unmotivated to do so at first. Lev reminds Kenma of Hinata due to their excitability, persistence, and poor skill in the essentials of receiving and serving. Lev also practices with Kuroo, who teaches him read-blocking skills. Post timeskip, Lev works as a model in Russia, along with his older sister, Alisa Haiba.

==== Yūki Shibayama ====
Voiced by: Takumi Watanabe (Japanese); Santry Rush (English)

Yūki Shibayama (芝山 優生, Shibayama Yūki) is a first-year student at Nekoma High and is a libero. He deeply respects Yaku and but lacks confidence in his own skills. So, he feels pressured to be just as good as Yaku when he plays. He is Nekoma's shortest player.

=== Dae-Tech High School ===
Dae-Tech High School (伊達工業高校, Datekōgyō Kōkō), or Dae-Tech for short, is located in Miyagi Prefecture. The team specializes in blocking and has the highest blocking rate in the prefecture, earning them the nickname "The Iron Wall". Their uniforms are white and teal, and their banner says "Date Tech's Iron Wall". They are known for their three-person block and read blocking.

==== Kaname Moniwa ====
Voiced by: Takashi Onozuka (Japanese); Patrick Poole (English)

Kaname Moniwa (茂庭 要, Moniwa Kaname) is a third-year student at Dateko High. He is a setter and the captain of Dateko's volleyball team during the Interhigh tournament. Until he retired, he had a hard time with the second-years, as they would not listen to him, and he often needed help from other teammates to keep them under control.

==== Yasushi Kamasaki ====
Voiced by: Takuya Satō (Japanese); Courtland Johnson (Season 1), Shannon Reed (Season 2–present) (English)

Yasushi Kamasaki (鎌先 靖志, Kamasaki Yasushi) is a third-year student at Dateko and a middle blocker. He is loud and often gets into arguments with Futakuchi, which ends with Moniwa asking Aone to intervene. He is a talented blocker and is known as part of the Iron Wall.

==== Kenji Futakuchi ====
Voiced by: Masatomo Nakazawa (Japanese); Mark Ivy (English)

Kenji Futakuchi (二口 堅治, Futakuchi Kenji) is a second-year student at Dateko and a wing spiker. He is also Dateko's ace. He becomes the captain once Moniwa retires. He and Kamasaki always argue and do not get along. He has a generally laid-back attitude and caused trouble for his seniors before they retired. Once he becomes captain, he is especially reminded of how he used to give his seniors a hard time after taking care of their new energetic setter, Koganegawa. Futakuchi is usually seen with Aone in between matches and also at school, as they are in the same class. Futakuchi is one of the more notable of the players that make up the Iron Wall. He has a special enmity against Karasuno since he was not able to stop their last score at their last match.

==== Takanobu Aone ====
Voiced by: Hiroki Matsukawa (Japanese); Mike Haimoto (English)

Takanobu Aone (青根 高伸, Aone Takanobu) is a second-year student at Dateko and a middle blocker. He is tall and is intimidating in appearance, but is actually very kind and soft-spoken. He does not speak much, only talking when he really needs to. Before a match against Karasuno, he had the habit of pointing out their ace as soon as he discerned him, which scares Asahi Azumane. He establishes a bond with Shoyo Hinata after the match against Karasuno, recognizing Hinata's ability to act as an effective decoy, even with a small body. He even feels offended on Hinata's behalf when Futakuchi calls Hinata useless without Tobio Kageyama and later says to Koganegawa that it is not always tall and strong that are difficult to defeat. He is a talented read blocker and a notable part of the Iron Wall.

==== Yutaka Obara ====
Voiced by: Isamu Yusen (Japanese); Jason Duga (English)

Yutaka Obara (小原 豊, Obara Yutaka) is a second-year student at Dateko and a wing spiker for the volleyball team.

==== Kōsuke Sakunami ====
Voiced by: Mao Ōnishi (Season 1), Junta Terashima (Season 2 onwards) (Japanese); Kory Getman (Season 1), Joel McCray (Season 2), Desi Ramirez (Season 4–Present) (English)

Kōsuke Sakunami (作並 浩輔, Sakunami Kōsuke) is a first-year student at Dateko and a libero for the volleyball team. He is in the same class as Koganegawa and was tasked by their coach to "steer" Koganegawa, due to the latter's lack of technique.

==== Kanji Koganegawa ====
Voiced by: Masayuki Shouji (Japanese); Mason Butler (Season 2), Kiba Walker (Season 4–Present) (English)

Kanji Koganegawa (黄金川 貫至, Koganegawa Kanji) is a first-year student at Dateko. Though he did not play at the Interhigh tournament, he becomes the team setter after the third-years retire. His primary strength is his exceptional height. Despite this, he lacks technical skill and is new to being a setter, often setting at too high an angle or even accidentally setting the ball out of bounds. He has an extremely energetic personality and believes that a player should give everything they have in a game. He later befriends Shoyo Hinata. Koganegawa is a decent blocker due to his height and is used as part of the team's blocking formation.

=== Fukurodani Academy ===
Fukurodani Academy (梟谷学園, Fukurōdani Gakuen) is a school located in Tokyo. The 'fukuro' (梟, fukurō) in the school name means 'owl', which is also their mascot. Fukurodani is a powerhouse school that ranks in Tokyo's top 4 and has been to Nationals multiple times. They are an exceptionally strong all-around team, especially due to the presence of their captain and ace, Kōtarō Bokuto, who is one of the top 5 aces in Japan. They often hold training camps with other Kanto schools such as Nekoma, Ubugawa, and Shinzen; this group is called the Fukurodani Academy Group. Their team colours are black, white, and gold, and their team banner says "One ball, heart, and soul".

==== Kōtarō Bokuto ====
Voiced by: Ryōhei Kimura (Japanese); Ian Sinclair (English)

Kōtarō Bokuto (木兎 光太郎, Bokuto Kōtarō) is a third-year student at Fukurodani Academy and captain and ace of the volleyball team. He is one of Japan's top 5 aces, only barely missing being in the top 3. Bokuto is an enthusiastic and cheerful person who is very passionate about volleyball. He is called "simple-minded" by his teammates and is easily delighted by successful spikes and praise, especially from Akaashi, whom he often asks for praise. In spite of his apparent childishness, Bokuto takes volleyball very seriously and is known, even amongst players from other regions, for his immense talent and in-game presence. He is especially well known for his cross-court shots and line shots, which are difficult to receive by opposing teams. However, Bokuto suffers from extreme mood swings during games that his team dubs his "emo mode", in which he is affected by small and trivial things in the middle of matches, which put him off his game. Despite the trouble he causes, the team, particularly Akaashi, is very patient with him, and they work together to boost his morale (usually with some form of praise) in order to bring him back to his best. He is a very social person who makes friends with other schools easily and tends to have a positive attitude. During the training camp, Bokuto bonds with Shoyo Hinata and teaches him various techniques, calling him his "star-pupil". He appears to be close friends with Kuroo and Akaashi, the latter of whom Bokuto is typically seen with at practice, between games, and at school. During the semi-finals in Hinata's first year, Bokuto proved that his last year playing with his high school team was worth it – which shaped the player he becomes as a professional. Ittetsu Takeda notes that Bokuto is a "weird" player who can lift the spirit of both his teammates and rivals, and is a player you want to cheer for regardless of the team you are rooting for. Post-timeskip, Bokuto plays for MSBY Black Jackals.

==== Keiji Akaashi ====
Voiced by: Ryōta Ōsaka (Japanese); Jeremy Gee (English)

Keiji Akaashi (赤葦 京治, Akaashi Keiji) is a second-year student at Fukurodani Academy. He is the vice-captain and a setter of the volleyball team. He is an intelligent, highly analytical player, usually running multiple scenarios and outcomes in his head before he decides what to do. He is very polite and calm, often seen with an unexpressive or slightly stressed face, usually due to one of Kōtarō Bokuto's impending mood swings. Akaashi is very patient with Bokuto and is the team's go-to person for handling the latter's mood swings. He is perceptive and keeps track of how Bokuto is feeling during games to gauge whether or not his "emo mode" will come out; when it does, Akaashi attempts to figure out what is bothering Bokuto and how to get him back to normal, whether it be as simple as gesturing for the team to praise him or setting up plays that allow Bokuto to boost his own morale (for example, by hitting a good spike). Despite this, Akaashi deeply admires Bokuto as a player and has faith in his skills; the two seem to be close friends even off the court. He is noted as a talented setter and is able to accurately and quickly set up successful plays for the team. He claims to not completely understand how Bokuto works yet, despite having memorized a list of at least 37 of Bokuto's weaknesses. Currently, Akaashi is an editor for Shonen Jump, although he wanted to be a part of the literature department.

==== Tatsuki Washio ====
Voiced by: Akira Koga (Japanese); Shannon Reed (Season 2), Camryn Nunley (OVAs and Season 4–Present) (English)

Tatsuki Washio (鷲尾 辰生, Washio Tatsuki) is a third-year student at Fukurodani Academy, and a middle blocker for the team. He is tall, stern, and fairly quiet. Though he is not as active as the rest of the team in making Kōtarō Bokuto feel better, he thoroughly supports and believes in Bokuto, and knows that Bokuto will eventually be fine. Currently, he plays for EJP Raijin in Japan's V.League, along with Inarizaki's Rintarō Suna and Itachiyama's Motoya Komori.

==== Yamato Sarukui ====
Voiced by: Junji Tachibana (Japanese); Kregg Dailey (English)

Yamato Sarukui (猿杙 大和, Sarukui Yamato) is a third-year student at Fukurodani Academy and a wing spiker for the team. He is often nicknamed "Saru" by his teammates. He, Konoha, and Komi often help Akaashi "fix" Kōtarō Bokuto.

==== Akinori Konoha ====
Voiced by: Taishi Murata (Japanese); Kory Getman (Season 2), Jacob Eiseman (OVA and Season 4–Present) (English)

Akinori Konoha (木葉秋紀, Konoha Akinori) is a third-year student at Fukurodani Academy and a wing spiker for the team. Konoha is relatively easy-going and is a well-balanced player; he was once called a "jack of all trades, master of none" by a Fukurodani crowd member, much to his annoyance. He often helps Akaashi deal with Kōtarō Bokuto; however, unlike Akaashi, Konoha is willing to use more aggressive methods, such as kneeing him from behind and forcefully slapping his back, and enjoys teasing him. However, he has complete faith in Bokuto, even telling Akaashi that he is allowed to ignore Bokuto because Bokuto will eventually come around.

==== Shuichi Anahori ====
Shuichi Anahori (穴掘 秀一, Shūichi Anahori) is a first-year student at Fukurodani Academy and a setter for the team.

==== Haruki Komi ====
Voiced by: Yukitoshi Kikuchi (Japanese); Mason Butler (Season 2), Kiba Walker (Season 4–Present) (English)

Haruki Komi (小見 春樹, Komi Haruki) is a third-year student at Fukurodani Academy and a libero for the team. He is outgoing and energetic and is Fukurodani's shortest member. He often tries to cheer Kōtarō Bokuto up when Bokuto loses motivation.

==== Wataru Onaga ====
Voiced by: Toshiyuki Hara (Japanese); Robert Cardenas (English)

Wataru Onaga (尾長 渉, Onaga Wataru) is a first-year student at Fukurodani Academy and a middle blocker for the team.

=== Shiratorizawa Academy ===
Shiratorizawa Academy (白鳥沢学園, Shiratorizawa Gakuen) is a high school located in Sendai, the capital city of Miyagi Prefecture. The first two characters of its school name 白鳥 mean 'swan' in Japanese, but because its direct translation is 'white bird', they are often represented by white eagles. They were the undefeated champions in Miyagi prefecture and rank in Japan's top 8. Their playstyle centers around their "left cannon", their ace and captain Wakatoshi Ushijima, who is one of the top 3 high school aces in the country. According to Coach Keishin Ukai, Shiratorizawa's power is more of an addition to each individual player's strength, since each player only plays to his own skills, contrasting Karasuno's 'multiplication' of player strengths. Shiratorizawa is notorious for its difficult entrance exams. As a result, most of its players (excluding Shirabu) were individually chosen through sports scholarships. Their school colours are white and purple, and their school banner is a Japanese idiom that roughly translates to "irresistible force". The school also has a middle school division, Shiratorizawa Academy Junior High (白鳥沢学園中等部, Shiratorizawa Gakuen Chūtō-bu).

==== Wakatoshi Ushijima ====
Voiced by: Ryōta Takeuchi (Japanese); Joe Daniels (English)

Wakatoshi Ushijima (牛島 若利, Ushijima Wakatoshi), also nicknamed "Ushiwaka", is a third-year student at Shiratorizawa Academy. He is a wing spiker and the captain and ace of its volleyball team. He has attended Shiratorizawa since Junior High. Ushijima is one of the top 3 aces in Japan, along with Wakatsu Kiryū and Kiyoomi Sakusa, and was the only representative from Tōhoku region selected to play for Japan's under-19 team in the Youth World Championships. He is known for his incredible power, as seen in his explosive jump serves and spikes, which are extremely difficult to receive. He is a left-handed hitter, which makes it difficult for opposing teams by forcing them to adjust their defense accordingly. He is a stoic, quiet, and serious individual; he speaks candidly without sugarcoating his words, often leading others to take offense. Ushijima is completely unaware of social cues and customs; he interprets everything at face value and is genuinely oblivious to his teammates' jokes or his opponent's challenges. Because Shiratorizawa's style of play focuses on getting the ball, he is represented as a sole white eagle, contrasting Karasuno's multiple black crows. As of 2020, he plays in the Schweiden Adlers. As of 2022, he plays for Orzeł Warszawa in the Poland Volleyball League.

==== Satori Tendō ====
Voiced by: Subaru Kimura (Japanese); Jessie James Grelle (English)

Satori Tendō (天童 覚, Tendō Satori) is a third-year student at Shiratorizawa Academy, and is a middle blocker for the volleyball team. Nicknamed "The Guess Monster", Tendō is an exceptionally talented blocker who primarily uses "guess blocking", which involves guessing which spiker the opposing team's setter will pass the ball to and where that spiker will hit the ball. He is highly intuitive and is consistently able to read his opponent's next move correctly, often basing the direction of his blocks on minimal hints or gut feeling. His guesses are said to be either "120% or 0%" effective. If he guesses correctly, he will undoubtedly block the ball; however, if he guesses wrong, there is no way he can stop it, as he will be out of place. Tendō is a cheerful and loud person, often teasing, nicknaming, and encouraging his teammates. After being bullied as a child, he has developed a slightly sadistic streak, as he relishes in and enjoys watching opposing teams struggle when he blocks them. Ever since he arrived at Shiratorizawa, he has developed a close friendship with Wakatoshi Ushijima, and the two refer to each other as "best friends" on various occasions. Post-timeskip, he has a buzzcut and is a chocolatier in France.

==== Tsutomu Goshiki ====
Voiced by: Shimba Tsuchiya (Japanese); Howard Wang (English)

Tsutomu Goshiki (五色 工, Goshiki Tsutomu) is a first-year student at Shiratorizawa Academy and is a wing spiker for the volleyball team. He is the up-and-coming ace of the team, with powerful straight and cross-court spikes. He looks up to his elders, especially Ushijima, although he constantly challenges Ushijima for the position of the top ace. He is often described as simple-minded and easy to fire up, but is dependable. Currently, he plays for Azuma Pharmacy Green Rockets in Japan's V.League along with Mujinazaka's Wakatsu Kiryu.

==== Kenjiro Shirabu ====
Voiced by: Toshiyuki Toyonaga (Japanese); Alejandro Saab (English)

Kenjirō Shirabu (白布 賢二郎, Shirabu Kenjirō) is a second-year student at Shiratorizawa Academy and is the starting setter for the volleyball team. He, unlike the other Shiratorizawa players, did not receive a sports scholarship to Shiratorizawa and was admitted after passing the entrance exam. He decided to join Shiratorizawa in his third year of Junior High when he watched the match between Shiratorizawa Junior High division and Kitagawa Daichi, because the winning Shiratorizawa play style relied on their ace (Wakatoshi Ushijima), not the setter. Shirabu is a calm and calculating setter, solely focused on getting the ball to Ushijima at all costs. He is easily irritated. After the timeskip, Shirabu is a fifth-year medical student.

==== Reon Ōhira ====
Voiced by: Teruyuki Tanzawa (Japanese); John Ramirez (Season 3), Desi Ramirez (Season 4–Present) (English)

Reon Ōhira (大平 獅音, Ōhira Reon) is a third-year student at Shiratorizawa Academy and is a wing spiker for the volleyball team. He is dependable at both receiving and spiking.

==== Eita Semi ====
Voiced by: Takuma Terashima (Japanese); Alan Brincks (English)

Eita Semi (瀬見 英太, Semi Eita) is a third-year student at Shiratorizawa Academy, and is a setter for the volleyball team. Nicknamed "Semi semi" by Tendō, he was originally the starting setter for Shiratorizawa. He is a highly skilled player with a quiet desire to showcase his skills when he plays; however, he was replaced by Shirabu because his playstyle was riskier, whereas Shirabu only focuses on sending the ball to Wakatoshi Ushijima. After being replaced, Semi is used as a pinch server, as his serves are both powerful and effective. Because the pinch server acts alone, he is free to show off his talent, which he would not have been able to do so as a setter. After the timeskip, Semi is a musician and civil servant.

==== Hayato Yamagata ====
Voiced by: Kenji Fukuda (Japanese); Antonio Lasanta (English)

Hayato Yamagata (山形 隼人, Yamagata Hayato) is a third year student at Shiratorizawa Academy, and is a libero for the volleyball team.

==== Taichi Kawanishi ====
Voiced by: Daiki Ōmori (Japanese); Nathan Wilson (English)

Taichi Kawanishi (川西 太一, Kawanishi Taichi) is a second-year student at Shiratorizawa Academy and is a middle blocker for the volleyball team. He was able to stop Karasuno's synchronized attack. It is also shown that he and Shirabu are close friends.

=== Inarizaki High School ===
Inarizaki High School (稲荷崎高校, Inarizaki Kōkō) is a high school located in the Hyōgo Prefecture of the Kansai region. The inari (稲荷) in the school name uses the same kanji as Inari Ōkami, the Shinto deity of foxes; thus, they are often represented by foxes and torii. The team is highly popular and fan favorites for winning at Nationals, and are supported by their strong lineup, particularly the Miya twins, Atsumu and Osamu Miya. Inarizaki has a large marching band, orchestra, and cheer team at their games. They have a passionate fanbase known for booing opposing teams. Their uniforms are black and white, and their school banner says "we don't need the memories", alluding to their highly competitive nature.

==== Shinsuke Kita ====
Voiced by: Kenji Nojima (Japanese); Kevin D. Thelwell (English)

Shinsuke Kita (北 信介, Kita Shinsuke) is a third-year student at Inarizaki High School. He is a wing spiker and the captain of the volleyball team. Kita has been raised since childhood by his grandma in the belief that "the gods are always watching" and as a result is calm, collected, and polite, to the point that his teammates feel he is more robot than human. He is not an exceptional player, as his teammates are, but his strength comes from his ability to maintain calm even in the most stressful situations. Up until his third year of high school, Kita never played in an official match and did not even receive a uniform in his middle school years. Upon being named captain of Inarizaki, he showed a rare moment of emotion and cried tears of joy. As a captain, Kita is extremely thoughtful and considerate to his teammates, watching them closely and often bluntly giving them advice. For this reason, his teammates are somewhat scared of him. As of 2020, he runs a rice farm.

==== Ren Ōmimi ====
Voiced by: Takumu Miyazono (Japanese); Joe Daniels (English)

Ren Ōmimi (大耳 練, Ōmimi Ren) is a third-year at Inarizaki High School, and a middle blocker. He is a very tall and skilled blocker. Shoyo Hinata nicknamed him the "scary-looking guy".

==== Aran Ojiro ====
Voiced by: Jun Kasama (Japanese); Camryn Nunley (English)

Aran Ojiro (尾白 アラン, Ojiro Aran) is a third-year student and a wing spiker. He is the ace of Inarizaki and regarded as one of the top 5 best high school spikers in Japan. He is shown to be mature and close with the whole team. After the time skip, he plays for both the Tachibana Red Falcons as well as the JNT.

==== Hitoshi Ginjima ====
Voiced by: Shouma Yamamoto (Japanese); Dano Colon (English)

Hitoshi Ginjima (銀島 結, Ginjima Hitoshi) is a second-year student at Inarizaki High School and a wing spiker. He is shown to be a skilled spiker who is close with his teammates.

==== Atsumu Miya ====
Voiced by: Mamoru Miyano (Japanese); Blake Jackson (English)

Atsumu Miya (宮 侑, Miya Atsumu) is a second-year student and the team's setter. He is the older twin brother of Osamu Miya, who nicknames him "Tsumu". He is first shown when Tobio Kageyama meets him during the All-Japan Youth Training Camp, where he demonstrates exceptional skills as a player. Though talented at volleyball, Atsumu is sometimes shown to be immature and demanding, which puts him at odds with his teammates. After the time skip, Atsumu is a member of the MSBY Black Jackals.

==== Rintarō Suna ====
Voiced by: Nobunaga Shimazaki (Japanese); Howard Wang (English)

Rintarō Suna (角名 倫太郎, Suna Rintarō) is a second-year student and a middle blocker. Having been recruited from Aichi prefecture, he is the only player on the Inarizaki team that does not speak in a Kansai dialect. Like Kei Tsukishima, he is an intelligent blocker with an aloof personality.

==== Osamu Miya ====
Voiced by: Hideaki Kabumoto (Japanese); Daman Mills (English)

Osamu Miya (宮 治, Miya Osamu) is a second-year student at Inarizaki High School and a wing spiker for the volleyball team. He is the younger twin brother of Atsumu Miya, who nicknames him "Samu". Osamu is more collected and laidback than his twin.

==== Yūto Kosaku ====
Voiced by: Masaya Fukunishi (Japanese); Ry McKeand (English)

Yūto Kosaku (小作 裕渡, Kosaku Yūto) is a second-year student and a wing spiker.

==== Heisuke Riseki ====
Voiced by: Masaya Fukunishi (Japanese); Jack Stansbury (English)

Heisuke Riseki (理石 平介, Riseki Heisuke) is a first-year student in Inarizaki High School and a wing spiker.

==== Michinari Akagi ====
Voiced by: Yoshiyuki Matsuura (Japanese); Jason Duga (English)

Michinari Akagi (赤木 路成, Akagi Michinari) is a third-year student and the libero of the volleyball team.

=== Itachiyama Institute ===
Itachiyama Institute (井闥山学院, Itachiyama Gakuen) is a high school in Tokyo. Their ace, Kiyoomi Sakusa, is one of the top 3 in Japan, and their libero, Motoya Komori, is the number-one high school libero in the nation. Their uniforms are bright yellow, green, white, and black. In Shoyo Hinata's third year at Karasuno, they played against Itachiyama.

==== Tsukasa Iizuna ====
Tsukasa Iizuna (飯綱 掌, Iizuna Tsukasa) is a third-year at Itachiyama Institute. He is the setter and the captain of the team.

==== Kiyoomi Sakusa ====
Voiced by: Kōsuke Toriumi (Japanese); Clint Bickham (English)

Kiyoomi Sakusa (佐久早 聖臣, Sakusa Kiyoomi) is a second-year student at Itachiyama Institute. He is a wing spiker and the ace of his volleyball team, being the top ace of Japan. He is the cousin of Motoya Komori. He is introduced when his team wins against Fukurodani at the Tokyo qualifiers and earns the first spot as Tokyo representative at the Nationals, and again when he attends the All-Japan Youth Training Camp with Tobio Kageyama. He is shown to be a calm, mature, and quiet person. His power as a spiker comes from his extremely flexible wrists that allow him to spike the ball wherever he wants. He has an aversion to crowds, wears a face mask when not on the court, and is obsessed with hygiene. After the time skip, Sakusa is part of the MSBY Black Jackals.

==== Motoya Komori ====
Voiced by: Yūto Uemura (Japanese); Houston Hayes (English)

Motoya Komori (古森 元也, Komori Motoya) is a second-year student at Itachiyama Institute and the libero for the volleyball team. He is the cousin of Kiyoomi Sakusa, but is dissimilar in personality. He is considered the top high school libero in Japan.

=== Kamomedai High School ===
Kamomedai High School (鴎台高校, Kamomedai Kōkō) is a high school located in Nagano Prefecture. The school has a powerful volleyball team, which focuses on serving, blocking, and having mental toughness. The team has some of the best blockers in the nation, who specialize in "read blocking".

==== Kōrai Hoshiumi ====
Voiced by: Natsuki Hanae (Japanese); Tyler Galindo (English)

Kōrai Hoshiumi (星海 光来, Hoshiumi Kōrai) is a second-year student at Kamomedai High. He is a wing spiker and ace for his volleyball team. He is first introduced when Tobio Kageyama meets him at the All-Japan Youth Training Camp. After the time skip, he plays with the Schweiden Adlers.

==== Sachirō Hirugami ====
Voiced by: Yu Miyazaki (Japanese); Michael Wronski (English)

Sachirō Hirugami (昼神 幸郎, Hirugami Sachirō) is a second-year student at Kamomedai High and a middle blocker for the volleyball team. He comes from a family of accomplished volleyball players.

== Other characters ==
=== Yui Michimiya ===
Voiced by: Asami Seto (Japanese); Maggie Flecknoe (English)

Yui Michimiya (道宮 結, Michimiya Yui) is the captain of girls' volleyball team at Karasuno High School. She is a third-year student who has been friends with Daichi Sawamura since middle school.

=== Saeko Tanaka ===
Voiced by: Yuka Komatsu (Japanese); Carli Mosier (English)

Saeko Tanaka (田中 冴子, Tanaka Saeko) is Ryūnosuke Tanaka's energetic older sister and a college student. She resembles her brother in appearance. She is also a member of a team of Wadaiko drummers.

=== Ikkei Ukai ===
Voiced by: Hiroshi Naka (Japanese); James Belcher (English)

Ikkei Ukai (烏養 一繋, Ukai Ikkei) is Keishin Ukai's grandfather who used to coach Karasuno's volleyball team until he was hospitalized. He now teaches children's volleyball.

=== Akiteru Tsukishima ===
Voiced by: Takahiro Sakurai (Japanese); Clifford Chapin (English)

Tsukishima Akiteru (月島 明光, Akiteru Tsukishima) is Kei Tsukishima's brother, who is in college and also plays volleyball. He comes to watch his brother play even though Kei mostly dislikes it. He also gives him tips regarding volleyball and also asks Kei to practice with his college team, to practice playing against bigger players.

=== Nobuteru Irihata ===
Voiced by: Mitsuaki Hoshino (Japanese); John Gremillion (English)

Nobuteru Irihata (入畑 伸照, Irihata Nobuteru) is the coach–advisor of the Aoba Josai High volleyball team. He lets the players come up with strategies, choosing to offer advice only when they are having trouble coming up with anything themselves.

=== Takurō Oiwake ===
Voiced by: Shin-ichiro Miki (Japanese); Philip Hayes (English)

Takurō Oiwake (追分 拓郎, Oiwake Takurō) is the coach–advisor of the Date Tech High volleyball team.

=== Yasufumi Nekomata ===
Voiced by: Nobuaki Fukuda (Japanese); John Swasey (English)

Yasufumi Nekomata (猫又 育史, Nekomata Yasufumi) is the coach–advisor of the Nekoma High volleyball team. Having met Ikkei Ukai in his youth, he began a friendly rivalry with the other and, upon becoming coaches, both men sought to have their teams compete against one another in an official match. In the series, Nekomata has recently returned as Nekoma's coach and is in contact with Ittetsu Takeda; as a result, he orchestrates practice matches with the Karasuno team and invites them to the summer training camp.

=== Tanji Washijō ===
Voiced by: Ryusei Nakao (Japanese); David Harbold, Dano Colon (young) (English)

Tanji Washijō (鷲匠 鍛治, Washijō Tanji) is the coach–advisor of the Shiratorizawa Academy volleyball team. Being of a short stature himself, he believes that power will always win, and follows the same principle in building his team. He is a strict coach, who imposes spartan training on his team. He dislikes coach Keishin Ukai's idea of always innovating. He begins to show a strange interest in Shoyo Hinata after their match. He helps sponsor Hinata's visit to Brazil and has high expectations for him.

=== Yūsuke Takinoue ===
Voiced by: Shūhei Sakaguchi (Japanese); Kyle Colby Jones (English)

Yūsuke Takinoue (滝ノ上 祐輔, Takinoue Yūsuke) is an alumnus of Karasuno's volleyball team. He and Shimada are part of the Karasuno Neighborhood Association and both come to watch Karasuno High's games. He works at Takinoue Electronics.

=== Makoto Shimada ===
Voiced by: Tomoaki Maeno (Japanese); Kregg Dailey (English)

Makoto Shimada (嶋田 誠, Shimada Makoto) is an alumnus of Karasuno's volleyball team. He and Takinoue are part of the Karasuno Neighborhood Association and both come to watch Karasuno High's games. He works at Shimada Mart. Tadashi Yamaguchi learns "jump float" serves from him after seeing him use the technique in their practice match.

=== Natsu Hinata ===
Voiced by: Haruka Yamazaki (Japanese); Allison Sumrall (English)

Natsu Hinata (日向 夏, Hinata Natsu) is Shoyo Hinata's younger sister.

=== Alisa Haiba ===
Voiced by: Mao Ichimichi (Japanese); Mariam Albishah (English)

Alisa Haiba (灰羽 アリサ, Haiba Alisa) is Lev Haiba's older sister. After the time skip, she models with her younger brother.

=== Miwa Kageyama ===
Miwa Kageyama (影山 美羽, Kageyama Miwa) is Tobio Kageyama's older sister. She is only shown in the manga.

=== Yūji Terushima ===
Voiced by: Takuya Eguchi (Japanese); Connor Borne (English)

Yūji Terushima (照島 遊児, Terushima Yūji) is the captain of Johzenji, another school.
