= Haikyu!! The Dumpster Battle =

2024 Japanese animated film by Susumu Mitsunaka

- Theatrical release poster
- Directed by: Susumu Mitsunaka
- Screenplay by: Susumu Mitsunaka
- Based on: Haikyu!! by Haruichi Furudate
- Starring: Ayumu Murase; Kaito Ishikawa; Yuki Kaji; Yuichi Nakamura
- Music by: Yuki Hayashi; Asami Tachibana
- Production company: Production I.G
- Distributed by: Toho
- Release date: February 16, 2024
- Running time: 85 minutes
- Country: Japan
- Language: Japanese
- Box office: $100.1 million

Haikyu!! The Dumpster Battle (Japanese: 劇場版ハイキュー!! ゴミ捨て場の決戦, Hepburn: Gekijō-ban Haikyū!! Gomi Suteba no Kessen) is a 2024 Japanese animated sports film written and directed by Susumu Mitsunaka and produced by Production I.G. Based on Haruichi Furudate's manga series Haikyu!!, it is a direct sequel to the anime television series. The film stars Ayumu Murase, Kaito Ishikawa, Yuki Kaji, and Yuichi Nakamura as part of an ensemble cast.

Haikyu!! The Dumpster Battle was released by Toho in Japan on February 16, 2024. In the United States, it was released on May 30, 2024, by Crunchyroll through Sony Pictures Releasing. The film grossed over ¥11 billion in Japan, making it the second highest-grossing Japanese film of 2024. A sequel, Haikyu!! vs. The Little Giant, is set to be released in 2027.

== Premise ==
Karasuno High School and Nekoma High School face each other in an official match for the first time, in the third round of the Spring Nationals. The Dumpster Battle—a battle between the crows (Note: Karasu (カラス, 烏) means crows in Japanese.) and the wildcats (Note: While ne (音) means sound and koma (駒) means horses, neko (猫) means cats in Japanese.)— begins. After numerous practice matches in the past year, Shoyo Hinata and Kenma Kozume finally get the chance to play against each other in a match that, if they lose it, cannot be replayed.

== Voice cast ==
| Character | Japanese | English |
|---|---|---|
| Shoyo Hinata (日向 翔陽, Hinata Shōyō) | Ayumu Murase | Bryson Baugus |
| Tobio Kageyama (影山 飛雄, Kageyama Tobio) | Kaito Ishikawa | Scott Gibbs |
| Kenma Kozume (孤爪 研磨, Kozume Kenma) | Yuki Kaji | Clint Bickham |
| Tetsurō Kuroo (黒尾 鉄朗, Kuroo Tetsurō) | Yuichi Nakamura | Ty Mahany |
| Daichi Sawamura (澤村 大地, Sawamura Daichi) | Satoshi Hino | Justin Doran |
| Kōshi Sugawara (菅原 孝支, Sugawara Kōshi) | Miyu Irino | Adam Gibbs |
| Asahi Azumane (東峰 旭, Azumane Asahi) | Yoshimasa Hosoya | Orlanders Jones |
| Ryūnosuke Tanaka (田中 龍之介, Tanaka Ryūnosuke) | Yū Hayashi | Greg Cote |
| Yū Nishinoya (西谷 夕, Nishinoya Yū) | Nobuhiko Okamoto | Greg Ayres |
| Kei Tsukishima (月島 蛍, Tsukishima Kei) | Koki Uchiyama | Leraldo Anzaldua |
| Tadashi Yamaguchi (山口 忠, Yamaguchi Tadashi) | Soma Saito | |
| Morisuke Yaku (夜久 衛輔, Yaku Morisuke) | Shinnosuke Tachibana | Jason Duga |
| Lev Haiba (灰羽 リエーフ, Haiba Riēfu) | Mark Ishii | Mike Yager |
| Taketora Yamamoto (山本 猛虎, Yamamoto Taketora) | Seigo Yokota | Andrew Love |
| Nobuyuki Kai (海 信行, Kai Nobuyuki) | Takanori Hoshino | Alex Mai |
| Shōhei Fukunaga (福永 招平, Fukunaga Shōhei) | Ryūichi Sawada | |
| Sō Inuoka (犬岡 走, Inuoka Sō) | Kyōsuke Ikeda | Joe Daniels |
| Yūki Shibayama (芝山 優生, Shibayama Yūki) | Takumi Watanabe | |
| Ittetsu Takeda (武田 一鉄, Takeda Ittetsu) | Hiroshi Kamiya | |
| Keishin Ukai (烏養 繫心, Ukai Keishin) | Hisao Egawa | |
| Ikkei Ukai (烏養 一繋, Ukai Ikkei) | Hiroshi Naka | |
| Yasufumi Nekomata (猫又 育史, Nekomata Yasufumi) | Nobuaki Fukuda | John Swasey |
| Manabu Naoi (直井 学, Naoi Manabu) | Kanehira Yamamoto | Jay Hickman |

== Production ==
The film was announced on August 13, 2022, as part of the two-film series titled Haikyu!! Final. On August 19, 2023, it was announced that the subtitle of the first film would be The Dumpster Battle. In December 2023, the Jump Festa '24 event announced "Orange", performed by Spyair, as the film's theme song.

== Release ==
The film was released theatrically in Japan on February 16, 2024. Seven rounds of special gifts were given to limited theatergoers by period, including a "33.5th" tankōbon manga volume in the first and final rounds.

Internationally, Medialink released the film in Hong Kong and Macau on April 11, Taiwan on April 12, Singapore and the Philippines on May 15, Malaysia on May 16, Vietnam on May 17, Indonesia on May 29, India on May 31, and Thailand going forward. In April 2024, Crunchyroll announced that they had acquired North American and select international theatrical rights to the film, including on May 30 in Australia, New Zealand, Denmark, Italy, Switzerland (Italian-speaking), Netherlands, Argentina, Brazil, Central America (Costa Rica, El Salvador, Guatemala, Honduras, Nicaragua, Panama), Chile, Colombia, Ecuador, Mexico, and Peru; May 31 in Finland, Ireland, Norway, Poland, Spain, Sweden, and United Kingdom; June 7 in Turkey; June 12 in Belgium, France, Luxembourg, and Switzerland (French-speaking); June 25 in Austria and Germany; and June 27 in Switzerland (German-speaking). The film was released in the United States and Canada on May 31.

== Reception ==
Haikyu!! The Dumpster Battle has grossed $100.4 million worldwide. The film debuted first in the Japanese box office, earning ¥2.23 billion on its opening weekend, and grossed over ¥10 billion in 75 days, becoming the fifteenth Japanese anime film with a box office over ¥10 billion. It has earned a total of ¥11.64 billion (about US$74.05 million) in its run in Japanese theaters, making it the second highest-grossing Japanese film of 2024.

On the review aggregator website Rotten Tomatoes, 76% of 21 critics' reviews are positive. PostTrak reported that 93% of audience members gave the film a positive score, with 80% saying they would definitely recommend it.

The film was nominated for Film of the Year, while Alessandro Pili was one of the Best Voice Artist Performance (Italian) nominees for his work as Kenma Kozume at the 9th Crunchyroll Anime Awards in 2025.

== Sequel ==
A sequel film, Haikyu!! vs. The Little Giant, is set to be released in 2027 along with the anime short Haikyu!! Where Monsters Go.

Adapting the Spring High School Volleyball Tournament from the Haikyu!! manga, the film will depict the quarterfinals match between Karasuno High School and Kamomedai High School. The match will primarily focus on the rivalry between Shoyo Hinata and Korai Hoshiumi, often referred to as the same nickname as Hinata's idol, "Little Giant".
