= Kyōsuke Ikeda =

Japanese actor

Kyōsuke Ikeda (池田 恭祐, Ikeda Kyōsuke) is a Japanese actor and voice actor who is affiliated with Gekidan Nihonjido. He is originally from Kanagawa Prefecture.

== Filmography ==
=== Live action ===
- Godzilla, Mothra and King Ghidorah: Giant Monsters All-Out Attack (2001) as a boy in hospital
- Bakuryuu Sentai Abaranger (2003) (Takaaki Utsumi)

=== Television animation ===
- Fruits Basket (2001) (Kyo Sohma (child))
- Yu-Gi-Oh! Zexal (2011) (Three (III))
- Ginga e Kickoff!! (2012) (Tagi Sugiyama)
- Haikyū!! (2014-) (Sō Inuoka and Yukitaka Izumi)
- Layton Mystery Tanteisha: Katori no Nazotoki File (2018–19) (Noah Montol)
- SD GUNDAM WORLD SANGOKU SOKETSUDEN (2019) (Zhao Yun Gundam 00)

=== OVA ===
- Final Fantasy VII Advent Children (2005) (Denzel)

=== Theatrical animation ===
- Naruto the Movie 3: Guardians of the Crescent Moon Kingdom (2006) (Hikaru Tsuki)
- Haikyu!! The Dumpster Battle (2024) (Sō Inuoka)

=== Dubbing ===
==== Live-action ====
- Black Nativity (Langston (Jacob Latimore))
- Charlie and the Chocolate Factory (Charlie Bucket (Freddie Highmore))
- Cinderella Man (Jay Braddock (Connor Price))
- Knives Out (Jacob Thrombey (Jaeden Martell))

==== Animation ====
- Arthur 3: The War of the Two Worlds (Arthur)
- Brother Bear (Koda)
- Brother Bear 2 (Koda)
- Chuggington (Eddie (Season 5 onwards))
- Finding Nemo (Turtles)
- Firebuds (Rod Royce)
