= Shoyo Hinata =

Fictional character from Haikyu!!

- Haikyu!! character
- Shoyo Hinata as drawn by Haruichi Furudate
- First appearance: "Endings and Beginnings" (2012)
- Last appearance: "Challengers" (2020)
- Created by: Haruichi Furudate
- Voiced by: Japanese: Ayumu Murase; English: Bryson Baugus

In-universe information
- Occupation: High School student (formerly); Professional volleyball player
- Nationality: Japanese

Shoyo Hinata (Japanese: 日向翔陽, Hepburn: Hinata Shōyō) is a fictional character and the main protagonist of the manga series Haikyu!! created by Haruichi Furudate. Shoyo is a high school student who wishes to become like the "Little Giant," a former Karasuno High School student and volleyball club member. To achieve his dream, he decides to join Karasuno, but to join the volleyball team he and Tobio Kageyama, a previous volleyball match opponent, must overcome their rivalry and work together.

In the Haikyu!! anime adaptation, he is voiced by Ayumu Murase in Japanese and Bryson Baugus in English.

== Concept and creation ==
In the one shot of Haikyu!!!, Kageyama was the protagonist and Hinata was his teammate. However, in the manga, Furudate chose Hinata as the main character in order to draw a shōnen manga. In an interview with Yomiuri Shimbun, Furudate stated that the development of Hinata dropping out of a major game due to his fever was decided early on to show that Hinata could not survive only with his impulse to compete in the nationals. The author believed that this could convince the reader. In addition, on the podcast Haikyu!! Karasuno High School Broadcasting Club! podcast, Furudate revealed that Hinata was originally more impetuous than Ryunosuke Tanaka, and also commented that he preferred to give Tanaka that personality.

His voice actor, Ayumu Murase, commented to Kageyama's actor, Kaito Ishikawa, that when he took on the role of Hinata, he did not have as many job opportunities as he does now, and he worked hard to play it. Murase also said that the response after the broadcast of the anime was excellent. He was then recognized not only by viewers but also by the people involved in the production, where his number of job proposals increased.

== Appearances ==
=== Haikyu!! ===
Aspiring to be a volleyball player, Hinata longed to be like the "Little Giant", a short Karasuno student who stood out as the team's ace. Hinata started playing volleyball in middle school. However, the club failed to have enough members, preventing Hinata from practicing properly and attending tournaments. The first official match of the school he attended was his last, where he played against Kitagawa Daiichi, where Kageyama attended. The match resulted in a total defeat to Hinata's team. Even so, this loss became the main character's primary source of motivation that eventually honed his overall character.

To win a match, he eventually attends Karasuno High School, where the "Little Giant" studied. There, he discovers that Kageyama studies at the same high school. Such resulted in a fight, almost prohibiting them from joining the club. When the two manage to make peace, they join the club along with Yamaguchi and Tsukishima.

After graduating from high school, he decided to go to Brazil alone to play beach volleyball. After a three-year stint in the country, he returns to Japan and participates in a match as a player for MSBY Black Jackals in the top division of the V League.

=== Video games ===
In Puyopuyo!! Quest, two collaborations were made with Haikyu!! where Hinata appeared as a guest in both. In the first release, his own card was implemented. In the second release, a scenario based on Haikyu!! To the Top was developed.

=== Theater ===
In Hyper Projection Engeki: Haikyu!!, Kenta Suga played the role of Hinata from 2015 to 2018, and Kotaro Daigo has been playing it since November 2019. Daigo cites the original Hinata as his rival, "because he is a person who respects and wants to surpass his positive personality, his unwavering attitude and his ability to grow hard."

== Reception ==
Ryoko Fukuda, of Real Sound, commented that "the positive attitude and physical strength in Hinata, not everyone can have it. That's what a shōnen hero has," and added "the reason of becoming stronger for what he likes and striving fervently arouses the reader's desire to support him." In an Anime! Anime! popularity poll, Hinata was voted as the first-most-popular character in Haikyu!!.

The volleyball player Yuji Nishida revealed in an interview with sports magazine Sportiva that foreign players had told him "You are Hinata." As a volleyball player, he talks about Hinata's small physique and great jumping ability. However, Nishida himself expresses that it is a combination of all the characters.

Japanese manufacturer Good Smile Company released figures of Hinata in their Nendoroid and Figma lines. Plushies were also released by some manufacturers.

At the 5th Crunchyroll Anime Awards, Shoyo won the award for Best Boy while he was nominated for Best Protagonist.
