= Hyper Projection Engeki: Haikyu!! =

Series of stage plays

- Promotional visual for Flight (2019)
- Music: Shunsuke Wada
- Basis: Haikyu!! by Haruichi Furudate
- Premiere: November 14, 2015: AiiA Theater Tokyo, Tokyo, Japan
- Productions: Original production (2015); A View From the Top (2016); Karasuno, Revival! (2016); Winners and Losers (2017); Summer of Evolution (2017); The Start of the Giant (2018); The Strongest Team (2018); The Tokyo Match (2019); Flight (2019); The Strongest Challenger (2020); The Dumpster Battle (2020); "A View From the Top 2" (2021)

Hyper Projection Engeki: Haikyu!! (ハイパープロジェクション演劇「ハイキュー!!」, Haipā Purojekushon Engeki Haikyū!!) is a series of 2.5D stage plays directed by Worry Kinoshita and written by Norihito Nakayashiki, based on the manga Haikyu!! by Haruichi Furudate. Since its debut in 2015, the series has amassed over 320,000 viewers during its run, spanning over a total of ten stage plays.

== Background and creation ==
The first stage play was announced in Weekly Shonen Jump in March 2015, with Worry Kinoshita directing, Norihito Nakayashiki writing the script, and Shunsuke Wada in charge of music direction. The play was described as a "hyper projection play" using projection allowing for manga-styled effects and a revolving stage.

Kinoshita had experience from directing productions using projection mapping, having directed a stage project for Tokyo Performance Doll in 2013. However, at the time, prior to his work on Engeki Haikyu!!, he had never seen 2.5D musicals. After reading the manga, he decided to stage the plays on "human drama" with "strong performance elements", as he had noticed that there were no dynamic "moves" or "magical attacks" in the series as there were in other sports manga. Nakayashiki, on the other hand, was a fan of Haikyu!!, and prepared a script from select dialogue from the original manga with no stage directions. Together, Kinoshita focused on staging the scenes while Nakayashiki focused on the dialogue between the characters. After storyboarding the scenes with stage directions, Kinoshita worked with the choreographer and several dancers before implementing the actors. He instructed the actors to resemble the characters from Haikyu!! as much as possible, but did not give them specific instructions beyond that.

== Production history ==
=== 2015–2018 ===
The cast for Karasuno and Aoba Johsai was revealed in July 2015 in Weekly Shonen Jump. The play premiered on November 14, 2015, at the AiiA 2.5 Theater Tokyo, later running shows in Osaka and Miyagi until December 2015. The play covers the introduction of the Karasuno High School volleyball team and their practice match with Aoba Johsai. It was released on DVD on March 16, 2016. The popularity of the play led to a second run with minor cast changes, which was retitled A View From the Top (頂の景色, Itadaki no Keshiki) and ran from April 8, 2016, to May 8, 2016.

The second stage play, Karasuno, Revival! (烏野、復活, Karasuno, Fukkatsu!), ran from October 28, 2016, to December 4, 2016, which focuses on Karasuno's practice match with Nekoma, and interhigh qualifier matches against Tokonami and Date Tech. It was released on DVD on April 19, 2017.

The third stage play, Winners and Losers (勝者と敗者, Shōsha to Haisha), takes place during Karasuno's match against Aoba Johsai during the inter-high. The play ran from March 24, 2017, to May 7, 2017, in Tokyo, Miyagi, Osaka, and Fukuoka. It was released on DVD and Blu-ray on September 13, 2017.

The fourth stage play, Summer of Evolution (進化の夏, Shinka no Natsu), ran from September 8, 2017, to October 29, 2017, focusing on the summer training camp with Karasuno, Nekoma, and Fukurodani. The play introduced new cast members for Fukurodani, Kiyoko, Yachi, Saeko, and Akiteru. It was released on DVD and Blu-ray on March 14, 2018.

The fifth stage play, The Start of the Giant (はじまりの巨人, Hajimari no Kyojin), ran from April 28, 2018, to June 17, 2018, focusing on Hinata and Kageyama developing a new technique and introducing new cast members for Jōzenji and Wakutani Minami. It was released on DVD and Blu-ray on October 17, 2018.

The sixth stage play, The Strongest Team (最強の場所(チーム), Saikyō no Chīmu), which focuses on Karasuno's match against Aoba Johsai and Shiratorizawa at the spring prefectural finals tournament, ran from October 20, 2018, to December 16, 2018. The production team also announced that all actors for Karasuno will leave production after the play. It was released on DVD and Blu-ray on April 17, 2019.

=== 2019–present ===
The seventh stage play, The Tokyo Match (東京の陣, Tōkyō no Jin), ran from April 4, 2019, to May 6, 2019, focusing on the match between Nekoma and Fukurodani with new cast members for Nohebi. It was released on DVD and Blu-ray on October 16, 2019.

The eighth stage play, Flight (飛翔, Hishō), ran from November 1, 2019, to December 15, 2019, starring an all new cast for Karasuno after the departure of the previous cast. New cast members for Sakusa, Hoshiumi, Atsumu, and Kanoka were also introduced, alongside the reprisal of selected roles from Aoba Johsai, Shiratorizawa, and Date Tech.

The ninth stage play, The Strongest Challenger (最強の挑戦者(チャレンジャー), Saikyō no Charenjā), was announced to run from March 21, 2020, to May 6, 2020, focusing on the match between Karasuno and Inarizaki at the Spring High. This play introduced new cast members for Inarizaki, Shimada and Saeko, and the reprisal of selected roles from Aoba Johsai, Shiratorizawa, and Date Tech as pre-recorded video appearances. However, the play only ran from March 21 to March 22, for four performances, due to the COVID-19 pandemic.

The tenth stage play, The Dumpster Battle (ゴミ捨て場の決戦, Gomisuteba no Kessen) was announced to run from October 31, 2020, to December 13, 2020, focusing on the Spring High match between Karasuno and Nekoma. This play introduced new cast members for Ikkei Ukai and Nekomata. Although the November 15, 2020, performances were cancelled, the production successfully ran to its intended end date.

The eleventh and final stage play, A View From the Top 2 (頂の景色・2, Itadaki no Keshiki Ni) was announced to run from March 20, 2021, to May 9, 2021, focusing on the Spring High match between Karasuno and Kamomedai along with the timeskip match between the MSBY Black Jackal and Schweiden Adlers. This play introduced new cast members for Kamomedai, Tenma Udai, Wakatsu Kiryū, and the reprisal of selected roles from Aoba Johsai, Nekoma, Date Tech, Shiratorizawa, and Inarizaki as both in-person and as pre-recorded video appearances. Due to a declared state of emergency in Tokyo and two production members testing positive for COVID-19, however, the production was only able to run until April 24, 2021, as the finale performance and its considered no-audience alternative were both cancelled.

== Principal cast and characters ==
=== Karasuno High School ===
Character	Original cast (2015-2018)	2019–present cast
Shoyo Hinata	Kenta Suga	Kotaro Daigo
Tobio Kageyama	Tatsunari Kimura; Tatsuya Kageyama (Note: Tatsuya Kageyama and Yuto Fuchino were recast as Kageyama and Nishinoya beginning in the fourth stage play, Summer of Evolution, in 2017, following Tatsunari Kimura and Shohei Hashimoto's departure after Winners and Losers. Kiyoko and Yachi also made their first appearances in Summer of Evolution, with Shizune Nagao and Ami Saito cast as the characters.)	Ryunosuke Akana
Ryunosuke Tanaka	Kouhei Shiota	Ko Kanegae
Yu Nishinoya	Shohei Hashimoto; Yuto Fuchino	Yuma Kitazawa
Chikara Ennoshita	Kazuma Kawahara	Yushin Nakatani
Kei Tsukishima	Ryotaro Kosaka	Ryosuke Yamamoto
Tadashi Yamaguchi	Kairi Miura	Yoshinari Oribe
Daichi Sawamura	Keita Tanaka; Kentaro Akisawa (Note: Kentaro Akisawa replaced Keita Tanaka after the first play, portraying Daichi beginning with A View From the Top in 2016 to Summer of Evolution in 2017. Tanaka reprised the role in The Start of the Giant and The Strongest Team in 2018.)	Sho Higano Koudai Takikawa
Koshi Sugawara	Hiroki Ino; Naoki Tanaka (Note: Naoki Tanaka was recast as Sugawara beginning in the fifth stage play, The Start of the Giant, in 2018, following Hiroki Ino's departure after Summer of Evolution in 2017.)	Ryu Ichinose
Asahi Azumane	Justin Tomimori	Yuya Fukuda
Hisashi Kinoshita	None	Sean Osada Shouta Morimoto
Keishin Ukai	Tsuyoshi Hayashi	Ken Ogasawara
Ittetsu Takeda	Shige Uchida	Kenta Kamakari
Kiyoko Shimizu	Shizune Nagao	Satomi Ohkubo
Hitoka Yachi	Ami Saito	Julie Yamamoto
Saeko Tanaka	Momoko Sadachi	Rina Yasukawa
Makoto Shimada	Kento Yamaguchi	Sho Somekawa
Tenma Udai	None	Daiki Sagawa

=== Shiratorizawa Academy ===
Character	Original cast (2018-2021)
Wakatoshi Ushijima	Kenji Arita
Eita Semi	Yusuke Sera
Reon Ōhira	Masafumi Yokoyama
Satori Tendō	Ken Kato
Tsutomu Goshiki	Shuji Kikuchi
Kenjiro Shirabu	Nobunaga Sato
Taichi Kawanishi	Ryoshiro
Hayato Yamagata	Shunichi Takahashi
Tanji Washijō	Taiyou Kawashita

=== Aoba Johsai High ===
Character	Original Cast (2015-2018)
Tōru Oikawa	Kōsuke Asuma
Hajime Iwaizumi	Yūya Hirata Allen Kohatsu (Note: Due to scheduling conflicts, the original actors for Daichi Sawamura (Keita Tanaka), Hajime Iwaizumi (Yūya Hirata), Shigeru Yahaba (Masanari Wada), and Issei Matsukawa (Ryō Hatakeyama) were not present for the second run. All four roles were recast.)
Yūtarō Kindaichi	Kōta Sakamoto
Akira Kunimi	Shōtarō Arisawa
Shigeru Yahaba	Masanari Wada Kaito Yamagiwa (Note: Due to scheduling conflicts, the original actors for Daichi Sawamura (Keita Tanaka), Hajime Iwaizumi (Yūya Hirata), Shigeru Yahaba (Masanari Wada), and Issei Matsukawa (Ryō Hatakeyama) were not present for the second run. All four roles were recast.)
Shinji Watari	Kenshin Saitō
Takahiro Hanamaki	Sonde Kanai
Issei Matsukawa	Ryō Hatakeyama Judai Shirakashi (Note: Due to scheduling conflicts, the original actors for Daichi Sawamura (Keita Tanaka), Hajime Iwaizumi (Yūya Hirata), Shigeru Yahaba (Masanari Wada), and Issei Matsukawa (Ryō Hatakeyama) were not present for the second run. All four roles were recast.)

== Reception ==
The stage plays have amassed a cumulative total of 320,000 attendees from 2015 to 2019. It was cited as one of the most popular 2.5D stage plays in 2018 along with Musical: The Prince of Tennis and Touken Ranbu; it is partially credited for the public's growing interest in 2.5D stage plays. Kenta Suga was made the ambassador of Japan 2.5-Dimensional Musical Association in 2018 partially for his work on the series.

The DVD release for A View From the Top, sold 8,660 copies on its first week, debuting at second place on the Oricon's Weekly DVD Chart. The DVD release for Karasuno, Revival!, sold 10,020 copies on its first week, debuting at third on the Oricon's Weekly DVD Chart. The DVD release for The Giant of Beginnings sold 4,247 copies on its first week, debuting at second on the Oricon's Weekly DVD Chart. The DVD release for The Strongest Team sold 4,247 copies on its first week, debuting at second on the Oricon's Weekly DVD Chart.

Sakura Eries of The Fandom Post called the series a "high-level production" with a cast that "displays an array of talent, ranging from acting to acrobatics to rap", noting that the plays used "clever choreography" and "simple effects".
