= Takanori Hoshino =

Japanese voice actor (born 1980)

- Born: 8 May 1980 (age 46); Mooka, Tochigi, Japan
- Occupation: Voice actor
- Years active: 2002–present
- Agents: Production Baobab; Office PAC

Takanori Hoshino (星野貴紀, Hoshino Takanori; born 8 May 1980) is a Japanese voice actor affiliated with Production Baobab and Office PAC. He is best known for his roles as Jack Atlas in Yu-Gi-Oh! 5D's and Masayuki Kikuchi in Zipang.

== Filmography ==
=== Television animation ===
2003

- GetBackers (Fuyuki Shido)

2004

- Zipang (Gunnery Officer Masayuki Kikuchi)

2005

- Eyeshield 21 (Kazuki Jumonji)
- Girls Bravo (Hayate)
- Gun Sword (Van)
- Yakitate!! Japan (Bob Kayser)

2006

- Digimon Data Squad (Ivan)

2007

- Yu-Gi-Oh! GX (Honest)
- Zombie-Loan (Otsu Sawatari)

2008

- Kannagi: Crazy Shrine Maidens (Daitetsu Hibiki)
- Yu-Gi-Oh! 5D's (Jack Atlas)

2010

- Fullmetal Alchemist: Brotherhood (Gustav)
- HeartCatch PreCure! (Desert Devil)
- Night Raid 1931 (Natsume Kagiya)
- Nura: Rise of the Yokai Clan (Shoei)

2011

- Wolverine (Vadhaka)
- No. 6 (Fura)

2012

- From the New World (Shisei Kaburagi)
- Kuroko's Basketball (Katsunori Harasawa)
- Smile PreCure! (Robotta)
- Space Brothers (Reiji Nitta)

2013

- Attack on Titan (Mitabi Jarnach)

2014

- Haikyū!! (Nobuyuki Kai)
- Hamatora (Henry Seigi)
- Ping Pong: The Animation (Ōta)
- Majin Bone (Dark Swordfish)

2015

- Triage X (Mr. Astro)
- Yu-Gi-Oh! Arc-V (Jack Atlas)
- Gintama (Tsukuyo (Male))
- Noragami Aragoto (Kugaha)
- The Asterisk War (Lester MacPhail)
- Seraph of the End: Battle in Nagoya (Taro Kagiyama)
- Garo: Guren no Tsuki (Fujiwara no Yasumasa)
- Attack on Titan: Junior High (Mitabi Jarnach)
- Ghost in the Shell: Arise Alternative Architecture (Raizo)

2016

- RS Project -Rebirth Storage- (Yūichirō Sawatari)
- Kabaneri of the Iron Fortress (Sahari)

2017

- Rage of Bahamut: Virgin Soul (Dante)
- Onihei (Heijū)

2018

- Dances with the Dragons (Jesper Livy Raki)
- Run with the Wind (Akihiro Hirata)
- Boarding School Juliet (Journey Rex)

2019

- Mob Psycho 100 II (Katsuya Serizawa)
- One Punch Man (Bakuzan)

2021

- Ancient Girl's Frame (Iwao Minamiya)

2022

- Mob Psycho 100 III (Katsuya Serizawa)

2023

- Bungou Stray Dogs (Yokomizo)
- Soaring Sky! Pretty Cure (Shido Harewataru (Ep. 23 onwards, replacing Yasumichi Kushida))

2025

- Headhunted to Another World: From Salaryman to Big Four! (Sylphid)
- The Mononoke Lecture Logs of Chuzenji-sensei (Shutaro Kiba)

2026

- The Vermilion Mask (Gouon)

=== Original net animation ===
- The King of Fighters: Destiny (2018) (Iori Yagami)
- 7 Seeds (2019) (Hazuki Karita)
- Exception (2022) (Oscar)
- JoJo's Bizarre Adventure: Stone Ocean (2022) (Donatello Versus)

=== Theatrical animation ===
- Yu-Gi-Oh!: Bonds Beyond Time (2010) (Jack Atlas)
- Fullmetal Alchemist: The Sacred Star of Milos (2011) (Raul/Alan)
- Ghost in the Shell: Arise (2013) (Raizō)
- Mobile Suit Gundam Narrative (2018)
- Haikyu!! The Dumpster Battle (2024) (Nobuyuki Kai)
- Made in Abyss: Mezameru Shinpi (2026) (Cravagli)

=== Video games ===
- Valkyrie Profile: Covenant of the Plume (2008) (Ernest)
- Terror of the Stratus (2011)
- Tales of Zestiria (2014) (Lucas)
- The King of Fighters XIV (2016) (Iori Yagami)
- Yu-Gi-Oh! Duel Links (2016) (Jack Atlas)
- Fate/Grand Order (2017) (Hijikata Toshizou)
- Nioh (2016) (Ashikaga Yoshiteru)
- The King of Fighters All Star (2018) (Iori Yagami)
- SNK Heroines: Tag Team Frenzy (2018) (Miss X)
- The King of Fighters for Girls (2019) (Iori Yagami)
- Kingdom Hearts III (2019) (Mickey Mouse)
- Kingdom Hearts III Re Mind (2020) (Mickey Mouse)
- Kingdom Hearts: Melody of Memory (2020) (Mickey Mouse)
- Twisted Wonderland (2020) (Mickey Mouse)
- Final Fantasy XIV: Endwalker (2021) (Golbez)
- The King of Fighters XV (2022) (Iori Yagami)
- Genshin Impact (2022) (Pantalone)
- Final Fantasy XIV: Dawntrail (2024) (Golbez)
- Xenoblade Chronicles X: Definitive Edition (2025) (Lao)

=== Dubbing ===
==== Live-action ====
- Henry Cavill
  - Man of Steel (Kal-El / Clark Kent / Superman)
  - The Man from U.N.C.L.E. (Napoleon Solo)
  - Batman v Superman: Dawn of Justice (Kal-El / Clark Kent / Superman)
  - Sand Castle (Captain Syverson)
  - Justice League (Clark Kent / Superman)
  - Enola Holmes (Sherlock Holmes)
  - Zack Snyder's Justice League (Kal-El / Clark Kent / Superman)
  - Enola Holmes 2 (Sherlock Holmes)
  - Black Adam (Kal-El / Clark Kent / Superman)
  - Argylle (Argylle)
  - Deadpool & Wolverine (Cavillrine)
  - In the Grey (Sid)
- The 100 (Bellamy Blake (Bobby Morley))
- Alita: Battle Angel (Jashugan (Jai Courtney))
- Brightburn (Kyle Breyer (David Denman))
- Doctor Strange in the Multiverse of Madness (Reed Richards / Mister Fantastic (John Krasinski))
- The Fencer (Endel (Märt Avandi))
- Frankenstein (The Creature (Jacob Elordi))
- The Good Lie (Jeremiah (Ger Duany))
- The Grandmaster (Ma San (Max Zhang))
- Hotel Mumbai (David (Armie Hammer))
- Into the Blue 2: The Reef (Sebastian White (Chris Carmack))
- Journey to the West: The Demons Strike Back (Sha Wujing (Mengke Bateer))
- Jurassic World (2017 NTV edition) (Barry (Omar Sy))
- The Legend of Hercules (Sotiris (Liam McIntyre))
- Licence to Kill (2006 DVD edition) (Dario (Benicio del Toro))
- Lucifer (Lieutenant Marcus Pierce / Cain (Tom Welling))
- The Magnificent Seven (Vasquez (Manuel Garcia-Rulfo))
- Maleficent: Mistress of Evil (Borra (Ed Skrein))
- The Man Who Invented Christmas (Rev. Henry Burnett / Bob Cratchit (Marcus Lamb))
- Manhattan Night (Simon Crowley (Campbell Scott))
- Mercenary for Justice (Kruger (Langley Kirkwood))
- Moonfall (General Doug Davidson (Eme Ikwuakor))
- Napoleon (Napoleon Bonaparte (Joaquin Phoenix))
- Ocean's Twelve (Topher Grace)
- A Quiet Place (Lee Abbott (John Krasinski))
- A Quiet Place Part II (Lee Abbott (John Krasinski))
- Red Notice (Sotto Voce (Chris Diamantopoulos))
- Red Riding Hood (Henry Lazar (Max Irons))
- The Schouwendam 12 (Mysterious Man (Gijs Naber))
- Shazam! (2021 THE CINEMA edition) (Víctor Vásquez (Cooper Andrews))
- Somewhere in Time (Netflix edition) (Richard Collier (Christopher Reeve))
- Willow (Thraxus Boorman (Amar Chadha-Patel))

==== Animation ====
- Doctor Strange: The Sorcerer Supreme (Baron Mordo)
- Mickey Mouse (since November 2018)
- Monster Hunter: Legends of the Guild (Julius)
- Transformers One (Shockwave)
