= Victory Kickoff!! =

Japanese anime television series

- Ginga e Kickoff!!

銀河へキックオフ!! (Ginga e Kikkuofu!!)
- Genre: Sports (Association football)
- Anime television series
- Directed by: Kōnosuke Uda
- Studio: TYO Animations
- Original network: NHK BS-Premium, NHK-G
- Original run: April 3, 2012 – February 26, 2013
- Episodes: 39

Victory Kickoff!! (銀河へキックオフ!!, Ginga e Kikkuofu!!; lit. Kickoff to the Galaxy!!) is a Japanese anime series produced by TYO Animations. It follows the Momoyama Predators, an association football team formed by elementary school students.

The series was distributed by NHK and broadcast on NHK General TV and NHK BS-Premium from April 3, 2012, to February 26, 2013

== Characters ==
=== Momoyama Predators (formerly Momoyama Dandelions) ===
Current Players

Shou Oota (太田 翔, Ōta Shō)
Voiced by: Yū Kobayashi
Shou is a sixth grader, and in the beginning, he is the last remaining member of the Momoyama Predators and because of that the Manager disbands the team. Shou loves football, even though he is pretty bad at it. Despite all that, he goes off to try to find members to revive the team. First he meets Erika and her dog practicing football in the park and immediately asks her to join. After "recruiting" Erika, they have a falling-out when she realizes that there is no team for her to really join. The two come across Misaki Shimizu in the park where they were playing and challenge her to a 2 v 1 match. The two are crushed but in the end Shou manages to steal the ball and score. Shou is very strong-willed and loud, and though his football skills aren't so good in the beginning he gets better over time. His greatest asset is his ability to never take his eye off the ball and to see the patterns in the way players move. Misaki says that he will grow to become an amazing football player some day. Shou typically plays left defender.
Erika Takatou (高遠 エリカ, Takatō Erika)
Voiced by: Mariko Nakatsu
She is a sixth-grader originally from Osaka and is the former ace of the Namba Dandelions. Back then, she was known as the Speed Star due to her speed with the ball. It appears as though her team was also disbanded and she transferred to Shou's school. She has a bit of a complex about boys, saying that they are better than her because she is a girl and in several instances is deeply hurt and angered by it. After meeting Misaki Shimizu and Shou, she learns that women can be great players as well and that there is room for her to get "level up" if she doesn't give up. Erika is cheerful, full of energy, and very frank. She has a crush on Aoto. She typically plays left forward.
Kota Furuya (降矢 虎太, Furuya Kota)
Voiced by: Kenn
Kota is the first brother of the "Triplet Demons", and possesses great reflexes and athleticism which allow him to be naturally good at any sport, such as tennis, which is what the three brothers were practicing at the beginning of the anime. His heart longs to play football and though he doesn't speak much, when it comes to football he gets fired up and annoyed easily. He and his brothers want to be the best and he feels that in order for that to happen that they need an amazing coach. It is hinted that he is the one that initiated the breakaway from Momoyama Predators because the original coach was terrible. Kota has a vicious kick and typically plays center forward. His favorite color is yellow.
Ryuji Furuya (降矢 竜持, Furuya Ryūji)
Voiced by: Shinnosuke Tachibana
Ryuuji is the second brother of the "Triplet Demons", and possesses great reflexes and athleticism which allow him to be naturally good at any sport, such as tennis which is what the three brothers were practicing at the beginning of the anime. His heart longs to play football and when he gets the chance to he gets all fired up. Ryuuji, with his two brothers, left the Momoyama Predators due to the original coach being terrible and as a result many of the other players left leaving only Shou. Ryuuji is mild mannered in comparison to Kota and Ouzou and seems to be the most intelligent out of the three of them. Ryuuji has incredible ball control and typically plays center mid-field. His favorite color is green.
Ozo Furuya (降矢 凰壮, Furuya Ōzō)
Voiced by: Yoshimasa Hosoya
Ouzou is the third brother of the "Triplet Demons", and possesses great reflexes and athleticism which allow him to be naturally good at any sport, such as tennis which is what the three brothers were practicing at the beginning of the anime. His heart longs to play football and when he gets the chance to he gets all fired up. Ouzou, with his two brothers, left the Momoyama Predators due to the original coach being terrible and as a result many of the other players left leaving only Shou. Ouzou is the most boisterous of the brothers and comes off more like a delinquent. Ouzou excels in defense and typically plays right defender. His favorite color is red.
Reika Saionji (西園寺 玲華, Saionji Reika)
Voiced by: Riiko Tazawa
Reika is a large girl that is friends with Erika and is in the same class as Erika and Shou. She has a kind and quiet personality. Despite being large, she has an affinity for football. When the team needs one more player to qualify for the preliminaries, Reika steps up. Originally she states that she wants to play football for dieting, which really angered the Furuyas (especially Kota). She finds that she loves football and pushes hard to prove herself to the team. It is shown that she is in a well-to-do family and that she is secretly skipping her piano lessons to practice football under her mother's nose. She is a hard worker and is seen early in the morning practicing hard so that she won't be a burden for the team. Midway through the series, she slims down to roughly the same size as Erika, thanks to a rigorous training regimen and obstacle course she and her parents put together at their family villa. As a result, apart from slimming down, she is now very fast and has the most stamina out of the entire team.
Takuma Aoto Gonzalez (青砥 ゴンザレス 琢馬, Aoto Gonzarezu Takuma)
Voiced by: Kokoro Kikuchi
A member of the Heavens FC, he has a rivalry with Kota of the Triplet Demons because he managed to score three goals against them which has Kota up in arms about it. Aoto is actually quite small for his age but has amazing ball control and shooting ability. He is half-Japanese and half-Spanish as indicated by his last names. However, he joins the Momoyama Predators in hopes of going to Spain in order to meet his father.
Tagi Sugiyama (杉山 多義, Sugiyama Tagi)
Voiced by: Kyosuke Ikeda
A close friend of Aoto's and new goalie of the Momoyama Predators. He is half-Arabic and half-japanese. He used to play football with Aoto, but quit when he got discouraged from his increasing number of goalie errors. However, he begins to miss playing football. Aoto and Tagi both join at the same time and can once again watch over each other on the field.

Former Players

Tarou Uematsu (植松 太郎, Uematsu Tarō)
Voiced by: Atsushi Kousaka
Uchimura, Uematsu, and Ukishima are all friends whose last names start with U, thus they are typically called 3U. They were originally part of the Momoyama Predators but left when the Triplet Demons did on the pretense of having to study for their middle school entrance exams. Uematsu plays with his hair tied back and played as a right forward in the matches against New Tokyo FC women's club teams.
Yuto Ukishima (浮島 悠斗, Ukishima Yūto)
Voiced by: Suguru Inoue
Uchimura, Uematsu, and Ukishima are all friends whose last names start with U, thus they are typically called 3U. They were originally part of the Momoyama Predators but left when the Triplet Demons did on the pretense of having to study for their middle school entrance exams. Ukishima has pretty good reflexes and can pretty much play any position. In the beginning he plays as a goalkeeper in the team's matches against New Tokyo FC women's club teams.
Kei Uchimura (内村 桂, Uchimura Kei)
Voiced by: Fuyuka Oura
Uchimura, Uematsu, and Ukishima are all friends whose last names start with U, thus they are typically called 3U. They were originally part of the Momoyama Predators but left when the Triplet Demons did on the pretense of having to study for their middle school entrance exams. Uchimura is of a smaller build and has a bit of a bowl haircut. He played as a midfielder alongside Ryuuji Furuya in the matches against New Tokyo FC women's club teams.

Staff

Masaru Hanashima (花島 勝, Hanashima Masaru)
Voiced by: Rikiya Koyama
Introduced as a random drunkard on a park bench, Masaru was actually a professional football player that went by the name Lightning Light ace of the Chiba Thunderbolts. He possesses a lightning fast right kick. After watching him drunkenly dribble and head the ball, Shou gets Masaru(after numerous requests) to teach him how to head the ball. Shortly after he tries to get him to coach their football team. He initially refuses due to his past as a coach, but after a few games with the children and their(mainly Shou's) constant nagging he finally accepts. Masaru is easily provoked, as seen multiple times where the Furuya brothers get under his skin eventually forcing him to show off his professional football skills. He hates being called "Old man" because he believes that he isn't really that old.
Kyouko (杏子, Kyōko)
Voiced by: Rie Tanaka
Masaru's girlfriend and assistant coach, though she is actually a badminton player. Kyouko helps the Momoyama Predators however she can, from helping Shou track Masaru so he can recruit him to be their coach to providing snacks and additional training. Kyouko genuinely cares for Masaru and wishes to see him in his element again. She is a bad cook, and her first and only attempt resulted in a complete disaster and a miso soup that was too salty.
Kinzou Momoyama (桃山 金造, Momoyama Kinzō)
Voiced by: Kōtarō Nakamura
He originally disbanded the Momoyama Predators due to lack of players (Shou being the only one left in the beginning) but after being approached by Shou who had managed to get the players and a coach (who was a player in the J League and who coached a previous team to the Best 8 of the National Tournament) together he reconsidered. He has a standing rivalry with the manager of Tsubakimori SC and as a requirement of Masaru being a coach and the Momoyama Predators being active again, they MUST defeat Tsubakimori SC and qualify for the district tournament.

=== Secondary Character ===
Akira Kageura (景浦 晶, Kageura Akira)
Voiced by: Tomoaki Maeno
A member of the Amarillo FC, an elementary affiliate of the New Tokyo FC. He is known as the Emperor and is quite large and built for a sixth grader. Little is known about him other than he wants to play against the Furuyas very badly. He also has an amazing memory as he remembered Shou was in the Momoyama Predators having only seen him in the huddle once a year ago.
Suguro (須黒)
Voiced by: Kozo Mito
Captain of the Tsubakimori SC, a team managed by the business rival of the manager of the Momoyama Predators. He is first seen trying to force two other players to join him in a 3v3 against the Furuya brothers. When they run away, he gets Shou and Erika to play with them. He has a commanding presence on the field but his skills pale in comparison to the Furuya brothers.
Misaki Shimizu (志水 ミサキ, Shimizu Misaki)
Voiced by: Houko Kuwashima
A member of Rosa of New Tokyo FC, she plays the forward position and is known for her speed. She meets Shou and Erika in a park while she is training after an injury and is challenged to a 2v1 by them. After completely dominating them, Shou in the end manages to steal the ball from her and score. Shou asks her to be their coach but being a professional player she had to decline, but wanting to help their cause however she can, she gave them her cell number. She later invites Shou and Erika to a practice with her team and sub teams, which they get to participate in. After showing great promise, Misaki tells the two that they are welcome back after they form a team. She also gives Erika advice on how to deal with playing against boys and saying that it's ok for her to do so at the elementary level. Shou comes back with a team including the Furuya triplets to challenge the women's league, shooting to ultimately play against Misaki's Rosas. They get their wish after crushing the sub teams and are subsequently squashed by them, though their skill still impressed Misaki and the others. She wishes the team well and appears to support them from the background. Misaki was also a founding member of the Namba Dandelions, having drawn up the poorly drawn characters on Erika's poster when she was young.
Shunya Kubota (久保田 俊也, Kubota Shunya)
Voiced by: Chad Horii
A fifth grade goalkeeper of decent skill that is picked by Masaru to play with Momoyama Predators in order to qualify for games.
Jun Tanaka (田中 純, Tanaka Jun)
Voiced by: Taishi Murata
A fifth grade midfielder of decent skill that is picked by Masaru to play with Momoyama Predators in order to qualify for games.

== Episode list ==
1. Encounter
2. Speed Star
3. Triplet Demons
4. Lightning Light
5. Coach
6. The 11th Player
7. Three Tactics
8. Kickoff!!
9. Breakthrough
10. Suguro Special
11. Counter Attack!
12. The Young Lady Covered in Mud
13. Demon Extermination
14. Own Goal
15. Strong Point
16. 3U's Decision
17. Ball to the Future
18. First Goal
19. The Genius Striker
20. No Guard
21. Teamplay
22. Tears
23. Team Disbanded
24. Blind Football
25. New Friends
26. A Shocking Training Camp
27. The Promised Ticket
28. The Reborn Predators
29. Change
30. The Deciding Match
31. Despair and Hope
32. End of the Fierce Battle
33. Fate of Victory
34. To Barcelona
35. Start for Galaxy
36. Night Before Final
37. At Plaza Catalunya
38. World's Strongest Force
39. World Cup of Galaxy
