= Bryson Baugus =

American voice actor

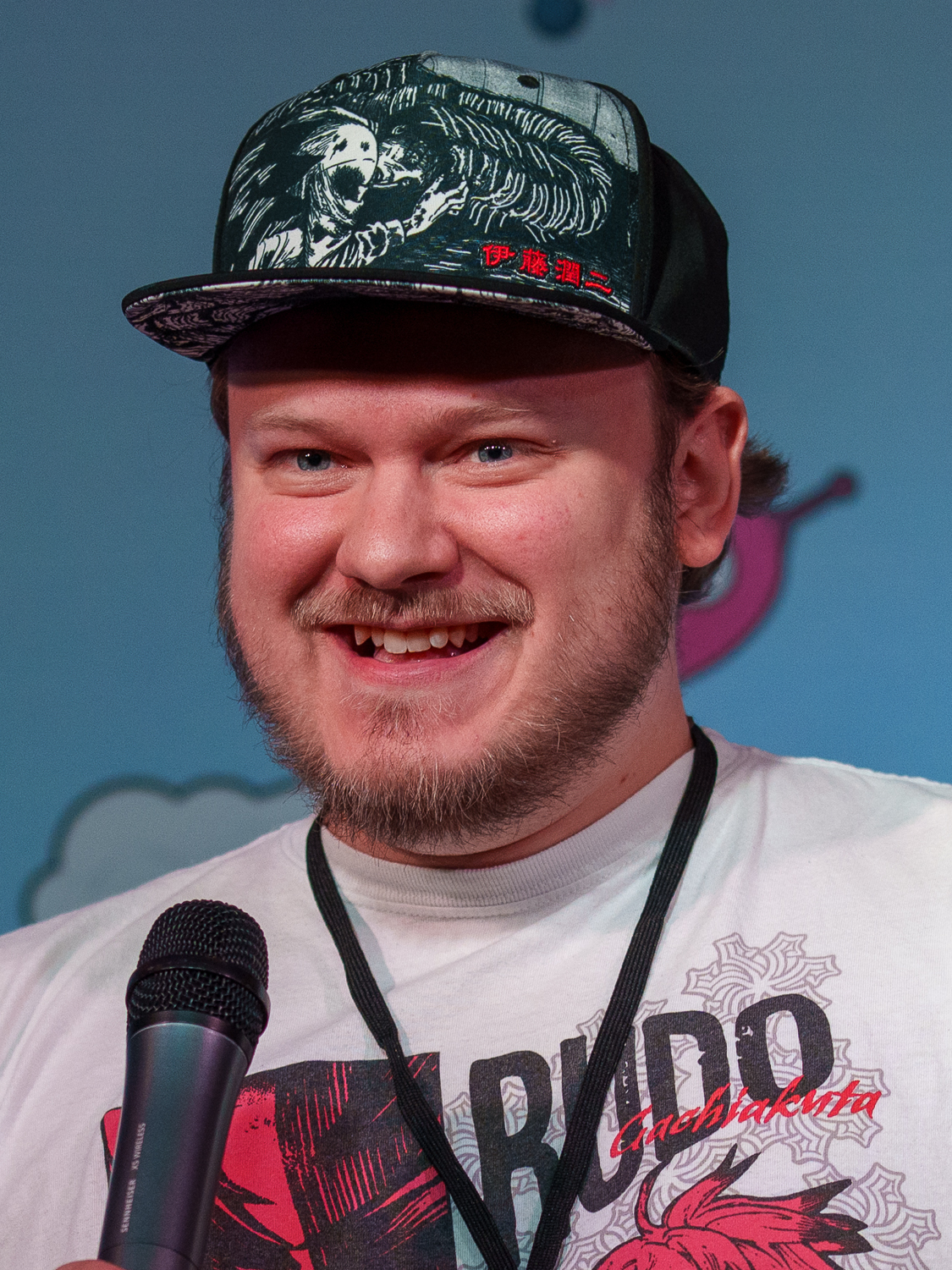
- Baugus at GalaxyCon St. Louis in 2025
- Education: Sam Houston State University
- Occupation: Voice actor
- Years active: 2012–present

Bryson Baugus is an American voice actor, who provides voices for English versions of Japanese anime series and video games.

== Biography ==
Bryson Baugus primarily is known for his work as Kakeru Miwa in Shikizakura, Pegasus Seiya in Knights of the Zodiac: Saint Seiya (2019) and the original 1986 anime series, Saint Seiya (2019 Sentai/Netflix dub); Shoyo Hinata in Haikyu!!; Bell Cranel in Is It Wrong to Try to Pick Up Girls in a Dungeon?; Falco Grice in Attack on Titan; Narumiya in Tsurune; Kaito Kirishima in Waiting in the Summer; Mitsuru in Darling in the FranXX; Takumi Aldini in Food Wars!: Shokugeki no Soma; Kimihito Kurusu in Monster Musume; Kanade Yuzuriha in Anonymous Noise; and many others. Baugus has a BFA in Acting/Directing at Sam Houston State University. Baugus voiced Yuga Ohdo in Yu-Gi-Oh! Sevens the sixth spin-off anime series in the Yu-Gi-Oh! franchise, this marks Baugus' first dubbed anime outside of both Sentai Filmworks and Texas.

== Filmography ==
=== Animation ===
List of voice performances in animation
Year	Title	Role	Notes	Source
2020	ZooPhobia	Jack	Speaking voice Ep. "Bad Luck Jack"; web short	Tweet, Credits in-animation on YouTube

=== Anime ===
List of dubbing performances in anime
Year	Title	Role	Notes	Source
2016	Re: Hamatora	Hikaru	Ep. 1-2, 7	
2016	When Supernatural Battles Became Commonplace	Yanagi Akutagawa		
2016	Gatchaman Crowds insight	Gelsadra (young)		
2016	My Love Story!!	Makoto Sunakawa (young)		
2017	Diabolik Lovers More, Blood	Kou Mukami		
2017–21	Chihayafuru	Tsutomu Komano		
2017	Blade Runner: Black Out 2022	Ren		
2017	Chivalry of a Failed Knight	Sugawara		
2017	Fate/kaleid liner Prisma Illya 2wei Herz!	Issei Ryudo		
2017–22	Food Wars! Shokugeki no Soma	Takumi Aldini		
2017	Is It Wrong to Try to Pick Up Girls in a Dungeon?	Bell Cranel		
2017	Monster Musume	Kimihito Kurusu		
2017	Ai no Kusabi	Kirie		
2017–22	Haikyu!!	Shoyo Hinata		
2018	Darling in the Franxx	Mitsuru	Funimation debut	
2018	Devils' Line	Kenichi Yoshii		
2018	Is It Wrong to Try to Pick Up Girls in a Dungeon? On the Side: Sword Oratoria	Bell Cranel		
2018	UQ Holder!	Mihashi, Vasago		
2018	Tsurune	Minato Narumiya		
2018	Tanaka-kun is Always Listless	Shimura		
2019–24	Knights of the Zodiac: Saint Seiya	Pegasus Seiya		
2019	Saint Seiya (1986)	Pegasus Seiya	2019 Netflix dub	
2019	Just Because!	Nakajima		
2019	Hakumei and Mikochi	Nobuki		
2019	Waiting in the Summer	Kaito Kirishima		
2019	Why the Hell are You Here, Teacher!?	Takashi Takahashi		
2019	Ao-chan Can't Study!	Masaki Uehara		
2019	Domestic Girlfriend	Natsuo Fujii (young)		
2019	Golden Time	Koba		
2019	Actors: Songs Connection	Hinata Mitsutsuka		
2019	The Legend of the Galactic Heroes: Die Neue These	Bernhard von Schneider	Season 2	
2020	The Pet Girl of Sakurasou	Iori Himemiya		
2020	Shirobako	Daisuke Hiraoka		
2020	Blade of the Immortal	Renzo		
2021–24	Attack on Titan	Falco Grice		
2021	Skate-Leading Stars	Susumu Ishikawa		
2021	Shikizakura	Kakeru Miwa		
2021	2.43: Seiin High School Boys Volleyball Team	Yuni Kuroba		
2021	The Case Study of Vanitas	Mikhail		
2022–23	Yu-Gi-Oh! Sevens	Yuga Ohdo		
2022	Himouto! Umaru-chan R	Kōichirō Ebina		
2022	Himouto! Umaru-chan R	Detective Nacon	Ep. 3	
2022	Teasing Master Takagi-san	Nishikata	Season 3	
2022	Kakegurui ××	Rin Obami	Sentai Filmworks dub	
2022	Shenmue	Wong		
2022	The Prince of Tennis	Katsuo Mizuno		
2022	Shikimori's Not Just a Cutie	Izumi		
2022	Amaim Warrior at the Borderline	Tsubasa Mishima		
2022	The Executioner and Her Way of Life	Mitsuki		
2022–present	Blue Lock	Seishiro Nagi		
2022	Chainsaw Man	Aki Hayakawa (young)		
2023	Vinland Saga	Harald (child)	Crunchyroll dub	
2023	In Another World with My Smartphone	Touya Mochizuki	Season 2 Replaces Jessie James Grelle	
2023	The Ancient Magus' Bride	Isaac Fowler		
2023	Dead Mount Death Play	Momoya Agakura		
2023	Oshi no Ko	Melt Narushima		
2023	Reborn as a Vending Machine, I Now Wander the Dungeon	Aka		
2024	Metallic Rouge	Rion		
2024	Solo Leveling	Hunter 10A, B-Rank Members		
2024	The Witch and the Beast	Craig		
2024	Wind Breaker	Akihiko Nirei		
2024	Haikyu!! The Dumpster Battle	Shoyo Hinata	Film	
2024	Blue Lock: Episode Nagi	Seishiro Nagi	Film	
2024	MF Ghost	Michael Beckenbauer		
2025	How I Attended an All-Guy's Mixer	Asagi		
2025	Lazarus	Leland Astor		
2025	Yakuza Fiancé: Raise wa Tanin ga Ii	Kirishima		
2025	2.5 Dimensional Seduction	Lord Ashford		
2025	Gachiakuta	Rudo Surebrec		
2025	Yu-Gi-Oh! Go Rush!!	Yuga Ohdo		

=== Film ===
List of voice performances in film
Year	Title	Role	Notes	Source
2022	Teasing Master Takagi-san: The Movie	Nishikata		
2025	Batman Ninja vs. Yakuza League	Robin / Damian Wayne		

=== Video games ===
List of voice performances in video games
Year	Title	Role	Notes	Source
2021	Yu-Gi-Oh! RUSH DUEL: Dawn of the Battle Royale!!	Yuga Ohdo		
2021	Cookie Run: Kingdom	Sherbet Cookie		
2021	Monark	Subaru Ikariya		BTVA
2022	Tower of Fantasy	Kanro		
2022	Yu-Gi-Oh! Cross Duel	Yuga Ohdo		
2023	Honkai: Star Rail	Gepard		Game official website
2023	Labyrinth of Galleria: The Moon Society	Romal, Marc		
2023	Yu-Gi-Oh! Duel Links	Yuga Ohdo		Konami's website
2024	Farmagia	Leii		
