= RS Project -Rebirth Storage- =

2016 anime television special

RS計画 -Rebirth Storage- (RS Keikaku -Ribāsu Sutorēji-)
- Genre: Mecha
- Anime
- Directed by: Osamu Kamei
- Produced by: Taku Matsuo; Yūichirō Nogami
- Written by: Miyuki Kishimoto
- Released: 26 June 2016

RS Project -Rebirth Storage- (RS計画 -Rebirth Storage-, RS Keikaku -Ribāsu Sutorēji-) is a 2016 Japanese mecha anime television special directed by Osamu Kamei and written by Miyuki Kishimoto, featuring character designs by Tsubasa Masao and mechanical designs by Shūichirō Satō. It premiered on 26 June 2016 on Fuji TV.

== Characters ==
Rin Sagami (佐神凛, Sagami Rin)
Voiced by: Kouki Uchiyama
Yuzuru Midō (御堂結絃, Midō Yuzuru)
Voiced by: Sumire Uesaka
George Muguruma (六車譲治, Muguruma Jōji)
Voiced by: Satoshi Hino
Yūichirō Sawatari (沢渡雄一郎, Sawatari Yūichirō)
Voiced by: Takanori Hoshino
Yuki Mishima (三島雪, Mishima Yuki)
Voiced by: Mai Nakahara
Kaori Shimizu (志水佳織, Shimizu Kaori)
Voiced by: Ayane Sakura

== Production ==
The anime project was the winning contestant of Every Star's Bokutachi no Mitai Mecha Anime o Tsukurou Seisaku Iinkai contest, where fans could submit their original mecha anime proposals, and the proposal with the most votes would be turned into an anime. The anime's format was revealed in March 2016 to be a television special that will debut on Fuji TV on 26 June 2016. Osamu Kamei directed the anime and Miyuki Kishimoto wrote the scripts, while Tsubasa Masao designed the characters and Shūichirō Satō provided the mechanical designs. Taku Matsuo and Yūichirō Nogami produced the series.
