= 2.5D musical =

Japanese type of musical based on anime, manga or video games

A 2.5 dimensional musical (Japanese: 2.5次元ミュージカル, Hepburn: nitengo jigen myujikaru; abbreviated 2.5D musical), also known as an anime musical, is a type of modern Japanese musical theatre production based exclusively on popular Japanese anime, manga, or video games. The term "2.5D musical" was coined to describe stories presented in a two-dimensional medium being brought to life.

Approximately 70 2.5D musicals were produced in 2013 and attracted at least 1.6 million people, most of them young women in their teens and 20s. 2.5D musicals are often seen as the starting point of many young actors in Japan.

== Definition ==
2.5D musicals are defined through make-up and costuming that accurately depicts the actor as the original character, along with exaggerated acting that mimics the expressions in the original work. It also include special effects and stunts that reenact the setting and tone of the original work. Directors of the musicals are usually the ones who write the lyrics to the songs. With the evolution of technology, some of the modern 2.5D musicals uses projection mapping, in which backgrounds and special effects are projected onto the stage and screens. According to the Japan 2.5-Dimensional Musical Association, the term not only applies to musicals, but also plays, comedies, and dramas.

== History ==
The first successful manga-based musical production was The Rose of Versailles in 1974 by the Takarazuka Revue. At the time, these plays were simply known as "musicals" or "anime musicals." Around the 1990s, a number of musicals and small stage skits produced were based on anime and manga series aimed at elementary school girls, such as Sailor Moon, Akazukin Chacha, and Hime-chan's Ribbon, which performed moderately well, but were not popular and were known as "musicals for elementary school girls" (女児物, joji mono). However, in 2000, Hunter x Hunter was considered revolutionary for the time because the voice cast for the original anime series had also played the characters onstage.

Japanese media-based musicals rose to popularity in 2003 with Musical: The Prince of Tennis through word-of-mouth and social media, which soon became a starting point for many up-and-coming actors. The shows attracted more than 2 million people during its run and was notable for using stage effects to simulate a tennis match, and it was popular enough to include its first overseas shows in South Korea and Taiwan in 2008. After its success, many productions based on anime, manga, and video games soon followed, some of the well-documented ones including Naruto, Yowamushi Pedal, Hyper Projection Engeki: Haikyu!! among others. Unlike productions featuring the Takarazuka Revue, which are supported by fans of the troupe, these musicals mainly draw anime and manga fans and other audiences that usually do not see plays on a regular basis.

The term "2.5D musical" was codified in 2014 when the initial director of Musical: The Prince of Tennis, Makoto Matsuda, first established the Japan 2.5-Dimensional Musical Association. At first, despite the success of Musical: The Prince of Tennis, he did not consider it a formal stage production on a par with most modern theater performances imported from Broadway. However, after a group of South Korean musical professionals had acknowledged Black Butler's production value and standards in performing arts, Matsuda decided to bring the genre worldwide. Plays certified by the Japan 2.5-Dimensional Musical Association offer theater glasses that contain subtitles in four other languages for people who do not speak Japanese. Since 2014, many 2.5D musicals have also been performed abroad in places like China, Taiwan, the United States, and parts of Europe. The magazine Bessatsu Spoon 2Di released a special issue on actors in 2.5D musicals on their 46th issue on February 18, 2015, which later spun-off into its own magazine series titled Spoon 2Di Actors released on August 3, 2015.

In 2018, "2.5D Musical Studies" was added as a program at the Tokyo School of Anime. In April 2018, actor Kenta Suga, who has starred as Gaara in Naruto and Hinata in Hyper Projection Engeki: Haikyu!!, was appointed as overseas ambassador by the Japan 2.5-Dimensional Musical Association, succeeding Ryo Kato. By the end of 2018, the 2.5D musical market had increased by 44.9% over the previous year, grossing ¥22.6 billion.
