= Hiroki Ino =

Japanese actor (born 1992)

- 猪野広樹
- Born: September 11, 1992 (age 33); Kanagawa Prefecture, Japan
- Education: Hosei University
- Occupation: Actor
- Years active: 2009–present
- Agent: Stardust Promotion
- Website: www.stardust.co.jp/section2/profile/inohiroki.html

Hiroki Ino (猪野広樹, Ino Hiroki; born September 11, 1992) is a Japanese actor associated with Stardust Promotion's Section 2. Ino debuted as an actor in 2009 and has notably appeared in the films Demolition Girl (2017) and Touken Ranbu (2019). He has also starred in several stage play adaptations, such as Hyper Projection Engeki: Haikyu!!, Blood Blockade Battlefront, My Hero Academia: The "Ultra" Stage, and Persona 5: The Stage.

== Personal life ==
Ino attended Hosei University beginning in 2011 and graduated in 2015. In November 2022, Ino was reported to be dating AKB48 member Nana Okada.

== Works ==
=== Film ===
Year	Title	Role	Notes
2017	Demolition Girl	Kazuo Kaneda	
2019	Touken Ranbu	Ookurikara	
2019	Itsumo Wasurenai yo	Adonis	

=== Television ===
Year	Title	Role	Network	Notes
2009	Saru Lock	Additional roles	Nippon TV	Episode 5-1
2010	Uchū Inu Sakusen	Additional roles	TV Tokyo	Episode 1
2017	Star Concierto: Ore to Kimi no Idol Michi	Hiroki Eikura	Tokyo MX	
2017	Scum's Wish	Takuya Terauchi	Fuji TV	
2017	Kono Yo nita Yasui Shigoto wa Nai	Tomoya	NHK BS Premium	Episodes 5 and 6
2018	Repeat: Unmei no Kaeru Jukka Getsu	Kaname Hirai	YTV	
2018	Dikita Malimot: Ōsen no Wakasha-tachi	Adonis	TVK	
2021	Real Fake 2nd Stage	Hiroki Uno	MBS, TBS	

=== Theatre ===
Year	Title	Role	Notes
2015	The Last Samurai	Takatoshi Iwamura	
2015	Musical: Hakuoki	Shinpachi Nagakura	
2015	Hyper Projection Engeki: Haikyu!!	Koshi Sugawara	
2016	Hyper Projection Engeki Haikyu!!: A View From the Top	Koshi Sugawara	Re-run
2016	Hyper Projection Engeki Haikyu!!: Karasuno, Revival!	Koshi Sugawara	
2016	Rock Musical Bleach: Another Above Ground	Byakuya Kuchiki	
2017	Watashi no Host-chan Reborn	Masato	
2017	Stage: Touken Ranbu	Ookurikara	
2017	Hyper Projection Engeki Haikyu!!: Winners and Losers	Koshi Sugawara	
2017	Hyper Projection Engeki Haikyu!!: Summer of Evolution	Koshi Sugawara	
2018	Big Windup!	Misae Abe	
2018	Ensemble Stars! Extra Stage ~Memory of Marionette~	Mika Kagehira	
2018	Yowamushi Pedal Shin Interhigh-hen: Hakone Gakuen Ōja Fukukaku (The Kingdom)	Shunsuke Imaizumi	
2019	My Hero Academia: The Ultra Stage	Tenya Iida	
2019	Blood Blockade Battlefront	Zapp Renfro	
2019	Persona 5: The Stage	Protagonist	

=== Music video ===
Year	Artist	Song	Notes
2014	Supercell	"Sayonara Memories"	

=== Solo DVDs ===
List of solo DVDs, with selected chart positions, sales figures and certifications
Title	Year	Details	Peak chart positions	Sales
Title	Year	Details	JPN	Sales
Hitch Your Wagon to a Star	2017	Released: January 27, 2017; Label: Spice Visual; Formats: DVD	91	—
"—" denotes releases that did not chart or were not released in that region.

== Publications ==
=== Photobooks ===
Year	Title	Publisher	ISBN
2017	Hiroki	Tokyo News Mook	ISBN 978-4863367104
2019	Iro (彩-IRO-)	Kadokawa	ISBN 978-4048963732
