= Kouhei Shiota =

Japanese actor and musician (born 1990)

- 塩田 康平
- Born: March 31, 1990 (age 36); Kagawa Prefecture, Japan
- Occupations: Actor; singer
- Years active: 2012–present
- Agent: Himawari Theatre Group
- Height: 174 cm (5 ft 9 in)
- Musical career
- Genre: Rock
- Instruments: Vocals; bass
- Website: profile.himawari.net/view/1960

Kouhei Shiota (塩田 康平, Shiota Kōhei; born March 31, 1990) is a Japanese actor, singer, and bassist associated with Himawari Theatre Group. He is the lead vocalist and bassist of the rock duo Bucks.

== Personal life ==
On May 1, 2019, Shiota announced he and a non-celebrity woman had registered their marriage.

== Filmography ==
=== Theatre ===
Year	Title	Role	Notes
2012	Musical: The Prince of Tennis 2nd Season: Seigaku VS Rikkai	Jackal Kuwahara	
2012	Musical: The Prince of Tennis 2nd Season: Seigaku VS Higa	Jackal Kuwahara	
2015	Hyper Projection Engeki: Haikyu!!	Ryunosuke Tanaka	
2016	Hyper Projection Engeki Haikyu!!: A View From the Top	Ryunosuke Tanaka	Re-run
2016	Hyper Projection Engeki Haikyu!!: Karasuno, Revival!	Ryunosuke Tanaka	
2016	Rock Musical Bleach: Another Above Ground	Ikkaku Madarame	
2017	Hyper Projection Engeki Haikyu!!: Winners and Losers	Ryunosuke Tanaka	
2017	Hyper Projection Engeki Haikyu!!: Summer of Evolution	Ryunosuke Tanaka	
2018	Hyper Projection Engeki Haikyu!!: The Start of the Giant	Ryunosuke Tanaka	
2018	Hyper Projection Engeki Haikyu!!: The Strongest Team	Ryunosuke Tanaka	
2019	Ginga: Nagareboshi Gin	Smith	
2019	Kono Oto Tomare!	Saneyasu Adachi	
2019	Persona 5: The Stage	Ryuji Sakamoto	
2021	Musical GOYA	Manuel Godoy	

=== Film ===
Year	Title	Role	Notes
2015	Eiken Boogie: Namida no Return Match	Satoshi Iga	
