= Haikyu!! =

Japanese manga series

- First tankōbon volume cover, featuring Shoyo Hinata (front) and Tobio Kageyama (back)

ハイキュー!!
- Genre: Comedy; Coming-of-age; Sports
- Manga
- Written by: Haruichi Furudate
- Published by: Shueisha
- English publisher: NA: Viz Media
- Imprint: Jump Comics
- Magazine: Weekly Shōnen Jump
- Original run: February 20, 2012 – July 20, 2020
- Volumes: 45
- Anime television series
- Directed by: Susumu Mitsunaka (#1–60); Masako Satō (#61–85)
- Produced by: Wakana Okamura; Toshihiro Maeda; Fumi Morihiro; Keiichi Tomura (#1–25); Shinya Shinozaki (#1–60); Tomoyuki Saitō (#1–60); Kozue Kaneniwa (#1–60); Yū Honda (#61–85); Mayumi Kurashima (#61–85); Shōichirō Taguchi (#74–85)
- Written by: Taku Kishimoto
- Music by: Yuki Hayashi; Asami Tachibana
- Studio: Production I.G
- Licensed by: Crunchyroll (Note: In North America through Crunchyroll, LLC (formerly known as Funimation), in the United Kingdom through Crunchyroll UK and Ireland (formerly known as Manga Entertainment) and in Australia through Crunchyroll Store Australia (formerly known as Madman Anime). Animatsu Entertainment originally licensed the series in United Kingdom and Ireland.); NA: Sentai Filmworks (expired); SEA: Medialink
- Original network: JNN (MBS, TBS) (S1–4a); MBS, TBS, tbc, IBC (S4b)
- English network: SEA: Animax Asia
- Original run: April 6, 2014 – December 19, 2020
- Episodes: 85 + 5 OVAs
- Anime film

Haikyu!! The Movie: Endings and Beginnings
- Directed by: Susumu Mitsunaka
- Written by: Taku Kishimoto
- Music by: Yuki Hayashi; Asami Tachibana
- Studio: Production I.G
- Released: July 3, 2015
- Runtime: 89 minutes
- Anime film

Haikyu!! The Movie: Winners and Losers
- Directed by: Susumu Mitsunaka
- Written by: Taku Kishimoto
- Music by: Yuki Hayashi; Asami Tachibana
- Studio: Production I.G
- Released: September 18, 2015
- Runtime: 88 minutes
- Anime film

Haikyu!! The Movie: Talent and Sense
- Directed by: Susumu Mitsunaka
- Written by: Taku Kishimoto
- Music by: Yuki Hayashi; Asami Tachibana
- Studio: Production I.G
- Released: September 15, 2017
- Runtime: 90 minutes
- Anime film

Haikyu!! The Movie: Battle of Concepts
- Directed by: Susumu Mitsunaka
- Written by: Taku Kishimoto
- Music by: Yuki Hayashi; Asami Tachibana
- Studio: Production I.G
- Released: September 29, 2017
- Runtime: 89 minutes
- Manga

Haikyubu!!
- Written by: Kyōhei Miyajima
- Published by: Shueisha
- Imprint: Jump Comics+
- Magazine: Shōnen Jump+
- Original run: May 13, 2019 – March 24, 2025
- Volumes: 14
- Manga

Sudate Hinagarasu
- Written by: Retsu
- Published by: Shueisha
- Magazine: Saikyō Jump
- Original run: January 5, 2026 – present
- Haikyu!! Final anime films
- Haikyu!! The Dumpster Battle (2024); Haikyu!! vs. The Little Giant (2027)
- icon

Haikyu!! (ハイキュー!!, Haikyū!!; from the kanji 排球, 'volleyball') is a Japanese manga series written and illustrated by Haruichi Furudate. It was serialized in Shueisha's shōnen manga magazine Weekly Shōnen Jump from February 2012 to July 2020, with its chapters collected in 45 tankōbon volumes. The story follows Shoyo Hinata, a boy determined to become a great volleyball player despite his small stature.

An anime television series adaptation produced by Production I.G, aired on MBS from April to September 2014, with 25 episodes. A second season aired from October 2015 to March 2016, with 25 episodes. A third season aired from October to December 2016, with 10 episodes. A fourth season was released in two split cours from January to December 2020, with 25 episodes. The anime film series titled Haikyu!! Final will be released in two parts, which serves as the finale of the series; the first part titled Haikyu!! The Dumpster Battle, was released in February 2024, and the second and final part titled Haikyu!! vs. The Little Giant is set to be released in 2027.

In North America, the manga has been licensed by Viz Media, while the anime series has been licensed for digital and home release by Sentai Filmworks and later Crunchyroll.

Both the manga and anime have been met with positive responses. In 2016, Haikyu!! won the 61st Shogakukan Manga Award for the shōnen category. By December 2025, the manga had over 75 million copies in circulation, making it one of the best-selling manga series of all time.

== Plot ==
Junior high school student, Shoyo Hinata, becomes obsessed with volleyball after catching a glimpse of Karasuno High School playing in the Nationals on TV. Of short stature himself, Hinata is inspired by a player the commentators nickname 'The Little Giant', Karasuno's short but talented wing spiker. Though inexperienced, Hinata is athletic and has an impressive vertical jump. He joins his school's volleyball club—only to find he is its sole member, forcing him to spend the next two years trying to convince other students to help him practice.

In the third and final year of junior high, some of Hinata's friends agree to join the club so he can compete in a tournament. In his first official game ever, they suffer a crushing defeat to the team favored to win the tournament—that included third-year Tobio Kageyama, a prodigy setter nicknamed 'The King of the Court' for both his skill and his brutal play style. The two spark a short rivalry, and after the game, Hinata vows to defeat Kageyama in high school.

Hinata studies and is accepted to Karasuno, the same high school the "Little Giant" played for, but is shocked to discover that Kageyama has also chosen to attend Karasuno. Karasuno is revealed to have lost its reputation as a powerhouse school following the era of the Little Giant, often being referred to as 'The Wingless Crows' by other local teams. However, by combining Kageyama's genius setting skills with Hinata's remarkable athleticism, the duo create an explosive new volleyball tactic and develop an unexpected but powerful setter-spiker partnership.

Along the way, Hinata and Kageyama push each other into reaching their full potential, and Hinata develops relationships with his first real team, thus beginning Karasuno's journey of redemption to restore their reputation and make it to the Nationals.

Both Hinata and Kageyama aspire to be professional volleyball players, and they make a promise to one another after they graduate from high school that, no matter what, they will both play on the same court again.

== Media ==
=== Manga ===
Written and illustrated by Haruichi Furudate, Haikyu!! was initially published as a one-shot in Shueisha's seasonal Jump Next! on January 8, 2011. A second one-shot was published in the shōnen manga magazine Weekly Shōnen Jump on April 25, 2011. Haikyu!! started its serialization in Weekly Shōnen Jump on February 20, 2012. The series finished on July 20, 2020. Shueisha collected its chapters in 45 tankōbon volumes, released from June 4, 2012, to November 4, 2020.

At their panel at New York Comic Con, North American publisher Viz Media announced their license of the manga and released the series in 2016. Shueisha began to simulpublish the series in English on the website and app Manga Plus in January 2019.

A spin-off titled Haikyubu!! (ハイキュー部!!, Haikyū-bu!!), illustrated by Kyōhei Miyajima, was released in Shueisha's Shonen Jump+ website from May 13, 2019, to March 24, 2025. Its chapters were collected in 14 volumes, released from November 1, 2019, to September 4, 2025.

A 16-page special one-shot chapter written and illustrated by Furudate, centered on Karasuno High vs. Nekoma High showdown in different angle, was published in Weekly Shōnen Jump on February 5, 2024. A book from the original manga, titled Haikyu!! Volume 33.5, which includes a 16-page manga, character illustrations, the storyboard for chapter 322, and a Q&A with Furudate, was given to the Haikyu!! the Movie: Decisive Battle at the Garbage Dump theatergoers on February 16, 2024. The book had a limited print run of 2 million theatergoers.

A spin-off focused on Hinagarasu, the series' mascot character who is a parody of main protagonist, Shoyo Hinata, started in Shueisha's Saikyō Jump magazine on January 5, 2026.

=== Radio drama ===
A radio drama for the series was broadcast in November 2012 on TV Tokyo's Sakiyomi Jum-Bang! program, with multiple voice actors providing voice samples for the characters. It was later distributed in December 2012 via Shueisha's Vomic website.

=== Anime ===
An anime television series produced by Production I.G aired from April 6 to September 21, 2014, on MBS, other JNN stations, and with English subtitles on Crunchyroll. From episodes 1–13, the opening theme song is "Imagination" by Spyair, while the ending theme song is "Tenchi Gaeshi" by Nico Touches the Walls. For episodes 14 through 25, the opening is "Ah Yeah" by Sukima Switch, and the ending is "LEO" by Tacica. "Ah Yeah" is also used as the ending for episode 14, which has no opening. The anime has been licensed for digital and home video release by Sentai Filmworks.

A second season aired from October 4, 2015, to March 27, 2016. For episodes 1 through 13, the opening theme song is "I'm a Believer" by Spyair, while the ending theme song is "Climber" by Galileo Galilei. For episodes 14 through 25, the opening theme song is "FLY HIGH" by Burnout Syndromes, while the ending theme song is "Hatsunetsu" (発熱 – はつねつ; "Fever") by Tacica.

A third season, titled Haikyū!! Karasuno High School vs Shiratorizawa Academy (ハイキュー!! 烏野高校 VS 白鳥沢学園高校, Haikyū!! Karasuno Kōkō VS Shiratorizawa Gakuen Kōkō), aired from October 8 to December 10, 2016. The opening theme song is "Hikariare" by Burnout Syndromes, while the ending theme song is "Mashi Mashi" by Nico Touches the Walls. Sentai Filmworks has also licensed the third season.

A fourth season, titled Haikyū!! To The Top (ハイキュー!! TO THE TOP), was announced at the Jump Festa '19 event, with a "kickoff event" for the new series being held on September 22, 2019. The fourth season premiered on January 11, 2020, on the Super Animeism block. The opening theme is "Phoenix" by Burnout Syndromes and the ending theme is "Kessen Spirit" by CHiCO with HoneyWorks. It ran for 25 episodes, with the first cour running weekly from January 11, 2020, to April 4, 2020; the second cour was supposed to air in July 2020 but was delayed due to the COVID-19 pandemic. The second cour aired from October 3 to December 19, 2020, on the Animeism block. The opening theme is "Toppakō" by Super Beaver and the ending theme is "One Day" by Spyair. Crunchyroll simulcasted the fourth season.

==== Original video animations ====
Four original video animations (OVA) episodes have been released. The first, "The Arrival of Haiba Lev", premiered at the Jump Festa on November 9, 2014, and was released on March 4, 2015, in a limited-edition DVD release of the anime Haikyu!!, along with the 15th edition of the manga, while the second, "VS Failing Grades", premiered at the Jump Festa on November 3, 2015, and was released on May 2, 2016, in a limited-edition DVD release of Haikyu!!, along with the 21st edition of the manga. Two more OVA episodes, "Land vs. Sky" and "The Path of the Ball", adapting the Tokyo Nationals qualifiers story arc from the manga series, were released on January 22, 2020.

==== Compilation films ====
Supplementary compilation films have been released following the airing of the anime. After the first season and before the second season was aired in 2015, two compilation films were released. The first movie, Haikyu!! The Movie: Ending and Beginning (劇場版ハイキュー！！終わりと始まり, Gekijōban Haikyū!! Owari to Hajimari), was released on July 3, 2015, and the second movie, Haikyu!! The Movie: Winners and Losers (劇場版ハイキュー！！勝者と敗者, Gekijōban Haikyū!! Shōsha to Haisha), premiered on September 18, 2015. Two more compilation films were announced after the third season, in March 2017. Both films were released in September: the first film, Haikyu!! Genius and Sense (ハイキュー!! 才能とセンス, Haikyū!! Sainō to Sense), on the 15th and the second film, Haikyu!! Battle of Concepts (ハイキュー!! コンセプトの戦い, Haikyū!! Concept no Tatakai), on the 29th.

==== Anime films ====
On August 13, 2022, two Haikyu!! Final anime films were announced, serving as the finale of the series. The first film, Haikyu!! The Dumpster Battle, was released on February 16, 2024. In April 2024, Crunchyroll announced that they had acquired the North American and select international theatrical rights to the film. The film was released in the United States and Canada on May 31. The second film, Haikyu!! vs. The Little Giant, is set to be released in 2027 along with the anime short Haikyu!! Where Monsters Go.

=== Video games ===
Haikyu!! Tsunage! Itadaki no Keshiki was released on the Nintendo 3DS in Japan on September 25, 2014. Haikyu!! Cross Team Match was released on the Nintendo 3DS in Japan on March 3, 2016. Shoyo appears as a support character in the Jump crossover fighting game J-Stars Victory VS for PlayStation 3, PlayStation 4, and PlayStation Vita.

=== Stage plays ===
A series of stage plays titled Hyper Projection Engeki: Haikyu!!, directed by Worry Kinoshita, began running in 2015, starring Kenta Suga as Hinata.

== Reception ==
=== Manga ===
Haikyu!! received the 61st Shogakukan Manga Award for the shōnen category in 2016. Additionally, the series ranked fourth out of a total of fifteen comics recommended in Honya Club's Zenkoku Shoten'in ga Eranda Osusume Comic 2013 ranking. In November 2014, readers of Da Vinci magazine voted Haikyu!! the eighteenth Weekly Shōnen Jump's greatest manga series of all time. Haikyu!! ranked fourth on the 2014 "Book of the Year" list by Da Vinci magazine; it ranked sixth in 2015; ninth in 2016; fourth in 2018; thirteenth in 2019, along with Space Brothers; tenth in 2020; and eighteenth in 2021. On TV Asahi's Manga Sōsenkyo 2021 poll, in which 150,000 people voted for their top 100 manga series, Haikyu!! ranked eighth.

By December 2016, the manga had over 20 million copies in circulation; it had over 28 million copies in circulation by January 2018; over 33 million copies in circulation by December 2018; over 35 million copies in circulation by December 2019; over 38 million copies in circulation by May 2020; over 40 million copies in circulation by August 2020; over 50 million copies in circulation by November 2020; over 55 million copies in circulation by August 2022; over 60 million copies in circulation by September 2023; over 70 million copies in circulation by December 2024; and over 75 million copies in circulation by December 2025.

In Japan, Haikyu!! was the sixth best-selling manga in 2015, and eighth in 2019. It was the fourth best-selling manga series in 2020, with 7,212,099 copies sold. The first volume ranked 22nd on the Tohan charts between June 4 and 10, 2012. The second volume ranked eighteenth on the charts between August 6 and 12, 2012, and the third volume was also ranked eighteenth between October 8 and 14, 2012. In December 2016, the 24th volume topped Oricon's Top 10 Weekly Sales chart, selling 282,363 copies in its first three days. During the week of May 11–17, 2020, Haikyu!! was the second best-selling manga on Oricon's Top 10 Weekly Chart, selling 473,858 copies in a week and ranking only below Demon Slayer: Kimetsu no Yaiba.

Leroy Douresseaux of Comic Book Bin praised the story for its in-depth examination of personal and mental struggles in addition to athletic struggles, noting its prominent focus on character drama and team dynamics outside of volleyball.

=== Anime ===
In November 2019, Polygon named Haikyu!! one of the best anime of the 2010s, and Crunchyroll listed it in their "Top 100 best anime of the 2010s". IGN also listed Haikyu!! among the best anime series of the 2010s. According to Crunchyroll, Haikyu!! was one of the top 10 streamed anime in the UK, Canada, Oceania, Mexico, and Brazil on their streaming service during the winter 2020 anime season.

The anime won Sports Series of the Decade at the Funimation's Decade of Anime poll, where the fans voted for their favorite anime across multiple categories. On Tumblr's Year in Review, which highlights the largest communities, fandoms, and trends on the platform throughout the year, Haikyu!! ranked second behind My Hero Academia on the Top Anime & Manga Shows category in 2020; it ranked third in 2021. At the 5th Crunchyroll Anime Awards, Shoyo Hinata was awarded "Best Boy" while he was nominated for "Best Protagonist". The fourth season's opening theme, "Phoenix" by Burnout Syndromes, was nominated for "Best Opening Sequence".

Kim Yeon-kyoung, captain of the South Korean National Women's Volleyball team, reacted to and analyzed Karasuno's final rally against Aoba Johsai in season 2, expressing that while a few moments were exaggerated and impossible to do in real life, she was pleasantly surprised by its portrayal of high-level volleyball and thought it was "fun to watch". She noted that the creator "is a person with a high level of volleyball knowledge".

Melina Dargis of The Fandom Post praised its development of a team mentality with multiple characters rather than individuals, serving to emphasize that volleyball "... is not an individual event, but a team sport". Noelle Ogawa of Crunchyroll praised it for its portrayal of personal growth, emphasizing its dependence on having the "right people and the right environment to bloom in." Rebecca Silverman of Anime News Network commented on the development of non-players like Karasuno's team manager, Kiyoko, stating that "her triumphant jump as she brings Hinata his lost sneakers is a beautiful statement of the fact that she's just as much a part of the team as any of the boys". Silverman also comments on the anime's attention to detail, noting the inclusion of deep breaths in, the movement of muscles in player's legs, and point of view shots that follow the ball during rallies. Isaac Ackers applauded the anime for its creation of intensity without having to use the speed of real-life sports, noting that it "[tightens] its focus on individual moments, making each point a peak and each second leading up to those peaks essential. Instead of speeding up, it slows down. It hangs on specific plays, stretches out the time the volleyball is in the air, emphasizes the moments in between. It's simple, but it's sublimely effective."

Rafael Motamayor of Slash Film commended the anime, stating that "the best part of Haikyu!! is the way the show integrates relationships and character stories into the actual sport", noting that "what may look like a simple toss suddenly turns into a vital lesson in building trust with your teammates, and the planning and staging of a spike also means addressing and confronting years of self-hatred and doubts". He also complimented the combination of Production I.G's fluid animation and Yuki Hayashi's soundtrack, which "[elevate] a simple game into an operatic duel of fates", with "visual metaphors that [turn] every pass into a battle". Guillermo Kurten of Comic Book Resources praised Haikyu!! for its outstanding characterization and for its execution of an entertaining story, even for those who do not enjoy sports or have no volleyball knowledge. K. Thor Jensen of Mashable listed it on his list of the best sports anime.
