= Haruichi Furudate =

Japanese manga artist

Haruichi Furudate 古舘 春一
- Born: March 7, 1983 (age 43) Karumai, Iwate, Japan
- Area: Manga artist
- Notable works: Haikyu!!
- Awards: 61st Shogakukan Manga Award

Haruichi Furudate (Japanese: 古舘 春一, Hepburn: Furudate Haruichi; born March 7, 1983) is a Japanese manga artist. He is best known for creating Haikyu!!, a volleyball-centric manga that has become one of the best-selling manga series of all time, having also been adapted into a number of anime series and films.

== Biography ==
Haruichi Furudate was born on March 7, 1983, in Karumai, Iwate. After graduating from high school, he attended Sendai Design Training School in Miyagi Prefecture. In 2008, Furudate wrote the one-shot King Kid, which won an honorable mention for the Jump Treasure Newcomer Manga Prize. In 2010, Furudate launched his first full series in Weekly Shōnen Jump, Philosophy School, Yotsuya Sensei's Ghost Stories.

In the next year, Furudate wrote Haikyu!! starting as two one-shots that were published in Jump NEXT! and Weekly Shōnen Jump in January 2011 and April 2011 respectively. The one-shots were later turned into a full series, which started serialization in Weekly Shōnen Jump on February 20, 2012. The series ended in Weekly Shōnen Jump on July 20, 2020. While the series was serializing, it was awarded the 61st Shogakukan Manga Award in the shōnen category and ranked in the top three manga series for the 2015 Sugoi Japan Award. In 2020, the series was in the top five best-selling manga in Japan, with over seven million copies sold. The series has also been given numerous adaptations, notably an anime television series and a stage play.

== Influences ==
Furudate was a member of a volleyball club during middle and high school. Furudate often found himself going to school just to participate in the club activities, despite performing below average in classes.

== Works ==
- King Kid (王様キッド, Ousama Kid) (One-shot) (2008)
- Philosophy School, Yotsuya Sensei's Ghost Stories (诡弁学派、四ッ谷先生の怪谈, Kiben Gakuha, Yotsuya Sensei no Kaidan) (serialized in Weekly Shōnen Jump) (2010)
- Haikyu!! (ハイキュー!!) (serialized in Weekly Shōnen Jump) (2012–2020)
