= Touken Ranbu (film) =

Touken Ranbu: The Movie
- Theatrical release poster
- Kanji: 映画刀剣乱舞-継承-
- Revised Hepburn: Eiga Tōken Ranbu -Keishō-
- Directed by: Saiji Yakumo
- Written by: Yasuko Kobayashi
- Based on: Touken Ranbu by DMM Games and Nitroplus
- Produced by: Takeshi Date
- Starring: Hiroki Suzuki; Yoshihiko Aramaki; Ryō Kitamura; Masanari Wada; Hiroaki Iwanaga; Sadamoto Fuma; Norito Yashima; Koji Yamamoto
- Cinematography: Takeshi Tsuji; Eiji Mukoyama
- Edited by: Akira Takeda
- Music by: Takanori Nishikawa; Tomoyasu Hotei
- Production company: Tohokushinsha Film
- Distributed by: Toho
- Release date: January 18, 2019
- Running time: 105 minutes
- Country: Japan
- Language: Japanese

Touken Ranbu: The Movie (Japanese: 映画刀剣乱舞-継承-, Hepburn: Eiga Tōken Ranbu -Keishō-) is a 2019 Japanese fantasy film adaptation of a video game series of the same name. The cast from Stage: Touken Ranbu reprise their roles in the film. Distributed by Toho and Universal Pictures, the film was directed by Saiji Yakumo and written by Yasuko Kobayashi, and was released in Japan on January 18, 2019. The theme song of the film is "UNBROKEN" by Takanori Nishikawa feat. Tomoyasu Hotei.

The film follows a group of sword warriors, known as "Touken Danshi", as they attempt to stop an enemy faction known as the Time Retrograde Army from interfering with the Honnō-ji Incident.

== Plot ==
It is the year 2205 AD. A faction known as the Time Retrograde Army (TRA) are staging attacks on the past in order to change the course of history. In order to prevent this from happening, the Government of Time has recruited people known as Saniwa, who have the ability to breathe life into inanimate objects, to summon sword warriors known as "Touken Danshi", historical Japanese swords in the form of human bodies.

In response to an attack by the TRA in the year 1582 AD to prevent the Honnō-ji Incident, the Saniwa sends a team of six Touken Danshi: Mikazuki Munechika, Yamanbagiri Kunihiro, Yagen Toushirou, Heshikiri Hasebe, Fudou Yukimitsu, and Nihongou, to defeat the TRA. The TRA attacks Akechi Mitsuhide's army while Oda Nobunaga retreats to his room to commit seppuku. Nobunaga's vassal, as well as the former master of Fudou Yukimitsu, Mori Ranmaru, is killed while protecting Nobunaga. Mikazuki dispatches the enemies outside of Nobunaga's room and allows Nobunaga to commit seppuku as the Honnō-ji temple burns down. History proceeds as intended, and the news reaches a distraught Toyotomi Hideyoshi.

The Touken Danshi travel back to the citadel using teleportation devices shaped as spheres with their sword crests imprinted on it. Uguisumaru greets them along with a new Touken Danshi: Honebami Toushirou, who suffers from amnesia due to being burnt in a fire in the past. While Mikazuki reports back to the Saniwa on the success of their mission, he dissuades Hasebe from visiting the Saniwa, which rouses suspicions among the Touken Danshi.

The very next morning, the Saniwa reveals that Oda Nobunaga did not perish in the Honnō-ji Incident as intended. Instead, Nobunaga was saved by the TRA, and a mysterious member of the TRA known as Mumei (No Name) pledges the loyalty of the TRA to Nobunaga, while the Saniwa reassembles the same team from the previous mission, but Fudou is replaced by Honebami. Uguisumaru confronts Mikazuki on his suspicious and secretive behaviour regarding the Saniwa. Nihongou eavesdrops on the conversation, but Mikazuki notices his presence and changes the subject, and announces to Uguisumaru that he will be stepping down as the Saniwa's secretary.

Back in 1582, Toyotomi Hideyoshi returns to avenge his lord by chasing Mitsuhide to Shōryūji Castle. The Touken Danshi split up to trail Nobunaga and Mitsuhide, while Hasebe and Nihongou attempt to stop a TRA messenger from sending the news of Nobunaga's survival to Hideyoshi. While trailing Mitsuhide and his army, Nobunaga and the TRA ambush Mitsuhide. However, Mumei suddenly jumps in during the battle and defends Mitsuhide from Nobunaga. Mikazuki intervenes in the battle and escapes into the woods with Nobunaga. An oodachi brute of the TRA prevents the Touken Danshi from following and reassumes control over Mumei. Akechi Mitsuhide then vanishes, presumably killed by bandits as according to history.

Hasebe and Nihongou follow Toyotomi to Azuchi Castle after getting rid of the messenger. Yamanbagiri and Nihongou trade messages via carrier pigeon, stating Mikazuki's apparent betrayal and agree to meet up at Azuchi Castle. Yagen also recalls that Mumei, whom he clashes with at Honnō-ji, did not have the same presence as a regular TRA member. Meanwhile, Mikazuki escorts Nobunaga to Azuchi Castle. En route to Azuchi, Hasebe and Nihongou are ambushed by Hideyoshi's men, who knew that they were lying about Nobunaga's death and intends to kill Nobunaga at Azuchi Castle. At Azuchi Castle, the TRA split up their forces, with Mumei protecting Nobunaga while the TRA oodachi leaves to complete their own mission: an attack on the Saniwa's citadel. Hideyoshi arrives at Azuchi Castle and starts attacking its walls under the guise of chasing out Mitsuhide's remaining men. Yagen, Nobunaga's dagger, finally recalls the newly corrected history: Nobunaga escaped Honnō-ji with Mori's help, but dies at Azuchi Castle after being betrayed by Toyotomi Hideyoshi.

Nobunaga ambushes Honebami and demands Mikazuki to escort him to safety. Mikazuki refuses and answers both Nobunaga's and Honebami's concerns: Mikazuki believes that protecting history as he knows it will protect the many things he cherishes. He will protect Nobunaga as the legendary fearsome general he knows, but not the man that was now begging before him. Ultimately bested, Nobunaga releases Honebami and accepts his fate.

Back in the citadel, the shields break from the continuous assault. When Mikazuki rejoins his companions, he reveals that Honebami had taken their teleportation orbs and passed them to him. He sends them all back to the citadel against their wishes to defend the Saniwa and the citadel, while he confronts the TRA on his own. It is revealed that the Saniwa was transferring out due to advanced age and loss of power, which put their citadel at its weakest state. At Azuchi Castle, the team returns and saves Mikazuki with a new order from the Saniwa: to retrieve Mikazuki and return to the citadel. After eradicating the TRA, Nobunaga uses his blade, Yagen Toushirou, and commits seppuku successfully. In the citadel, the Saniwa manages to transfer out. The oodachi brute powers up to confront the Touken Danshi, but Mumei finally overcomes his possession and reveals himself to be a Touken Danshi: Kurikara Gou, Akechi Mitsuhide's short blade that was used against Nobunaga. Together, the Touken Danshi kill the oodachi brute and end the TRA's invasion.

After some time, the entire retinue of Touken Danshi awaits Mikazuki in the Saniwa's hall. He reveals to them their new Saniwa, a little girl. Mikazuki mused to his old master that he now had more to cherish and protect, while the other Touken Danshi entertained their new master in peaceful times.

== Cast ==
- Hiroki Suzuki as Mikazuki Munechika
- Yoshihiko Aramaki as Yamanbagiri Kunihiro
- Ryō Kitamura as Yagen Toushirou
- Masanari Wada as Heshikiri Hasebe
- Taizo Shiina as Fudou Yukimitsu
- Hiroaki Iwanaga as Nihongou
- Fuma Sadamoto as Honebami Toushirou
- Tomoki Hirose as Uguisumaru
- Norito Yashima as Hashiba Hideyoshi
- Koji Yamamoto as Oda Nobunaga
