= Trump (series) =

Japanese stage play series

- First tankōbon volume cover
- Genre: Gothic fantasy
- Created by: Kenichi Suemitsu
- Stage plays
- 1. Trump (2009); 2. Lilium (2014) and Nirin Zaki (2015); 3. Specter (2015); 4. Grand Guignol (2017); 5. Marigold (2018); 6. Cocoon (2019); 7. Kuro Sekai (2020); 8. Verachicca (2022); 9. Marionette Hotel (2024)
- Manga

Trump
- Written by: Kenichi Suemitsu
- Illustrated by: Hamaguri
- Published by: Kadokawa Shoten
- Magazine: Young Ace
- Original run: November 4, 2020 – December 4, 2023
- Volumes: 5
- Anime television series

Delico's Nursery
- Directed by: Hiroshi Nishikiori
- Written by: Kenichi Suemitsu
- Music by: Shunsuke Wada
- Studio: J.C.Staff
- Licensed by: Crunchyroll
- Original network: Tokyo MX, BS11, GTV, GYT, MBS
- Original run: August 8, 2024 – November 28, 2024
- Episodes: 13
- Manga

Cocoon
- Written by: Kenichi Suemitsu
- Illustrated by: Hamaguri
- Published by: Kadokawa Shoten
- Magazine: Young Ace
- Original run: September 4, 2024 – present
- icon

Trump (stylized in all caps, short for True of Vamp) is a Japanese stage play series created by Kenichi Suemitsu. It started with the first stage play running in 2009, and other plays, short stories, and concerts have since been followed. A manga adaptation with art by Hamaguri was serialized in Kadokawa Shoten's seinen manga magazine Young Ace from November 2020 to December 2023, with its chapters collected in five tankōbon volumes. An anime television series adaptation set years before the manga by J.C.Staff titled Delico's Nursery aired from August to November 2024.

== Plays ==
- Trump was originally performed on November 18–22, 2009, at the Independent Theatre 2nd in Osaka, by the theater company Peacepit.
- Lilium, a musical composed by Shunsuke Wada, was originally performed on June 5–21, 2014, at the Sunshine Theatre in Tokyo and the Morinomiya Piroti Hall in Osaka, by Engeki Joshibu. Their 2015 production of Lilium was accompanied by the shorter play Nirin Zaki (Note: Nirin Zaki (Japanese: 二輪咲き; "Two Flowers Blooming")) on August 31–September 1.
- Specter was originally performed on March 18–22, 2015, at the ABC Hall in Osaka, by the theater company Gekidan Patch.
- Grand Guignol was originally performed on July 29–August 20, 2017, at the Sunshine Theatre in Tokyo and the Umeda Arts Theater in Osaka, by Peacepit.
- Marigold, a musical composed by Shunsuke Wada, was originally performed on August 25–September 9, 2018, at the Sunshine Theatre in Tokyo and the Umeda Arts Theater in Osaka.
- Cocoon: Tsuki no Kageri and Cocoon: Hoshi Hitotsu, (Note: Cocoon: Tsuki no Kageri (COCOON 月の翳り; "Shadow of the Moon") and Cocoon: Hoshi Hitotsu (COCOON 星ひとつ; "Cocoon: One Star")) two connected plays, were originally performed on May 11–June 5, 2019, at the Sunshine Theatre in Tokyo and the Sankei Hall Breezé in Osaka.
- Kuro Sekai is a play in two parts, Uka no Shō and Hiyori no Shō, and was originally performed on September 20–October 20, 2020, at the Sunshine Theatre in Tokyo and the Cool Japan Park Osaka WW Hall in Osaka.
- Verachicca, a musical composed by Shunsuke Wada, was originally performed on January 15–February 6, 2022, at the Tokyo Tatemono Brillia Hall in Tokyo and the Cool Japan Park Osaka WW Hall in Osaka.
- Marionette Hotel was originally performed on September 14–October 6, 2024, at the Sunshine Theatre in Tokyo and the Sankei Hall Breezé in Osaka.

== Other media ==
=== Manga ===
A manga adaptation illustrated by Hamaguri was serialized in Kadokawa Shoten's seinen manga magazine Young Ace from November 5, 2020, to December 4, 2023. Its chapters were collected in five tankōbon volumes from June 2021 to February 2024.

A prequel manga series by the same illustrator, titled Cocoon, was set to begin serialization in the same magazine in Q2 2024, but was delayed due to Hamaguri's health. It later began serialization on September 4, 2024.

No.	Release date	ISBN
1	June 4, 2021	978-4-04-111455-1
2	March 4, 2022	978-4-04-112281-5
3	December 2, 2022	978-4-04-112964-7
4	July 4, 2023	978-4-04-113816-8
5	February 2, 2024	978-4-04-114513-5

=== Anime ===
An anime television series adaptation titled Delico's Nursery (デリコズ・ナーサリー, Derikozu Nāsarī) was announced on August 4, 2023. It is produced by J.C.Staff and directed by Hiroshi Nishikiori, with scripts written by Kenichi Suemitsu, character designs by Yōko Itō based on Kо̄ya's original designs, and music composed by Shunsuke Wada. The series was originally scheduled for July 2024, but was later delayed due to "production circumstances", and eventually aired from August 8 to November 28, 2024, on Tokyo MX and other networks. (Note: Tokyo MX and BS11 lists the series premiere on August 7, 2024, at 24:30, which is effectively August 8 at 12:30 a.m. JST.) The opening theme song is "Unfair" performed by Mika Nakashima, while the ending theme song is "Prayer" performed by Anonymouz. Crunchyroll streamed the series.

==== Characters ====
Dali Delico (ダリ・デリコ, Dari Deriko)
Voiced by: Masakazu Morita (Japanese); Derick Snow (English)
Gerhard Fra (ゲルハルト・フラ, Geruharuto Fura)
Voiced by: Katsuyuki Konishi (Japanese); Kieran Flitton (English)
Henrique Lorca (エンリケ・ロルカ, Enrike Roruka)
Voiced by: Hiro Shimono (Japanese); Ryan Negrón (English)
Dino Classico (ディーノ・クラシコ, Dīno Kurashiko)
Voiced by: Takuya Satō (Japanese); John Burgmeier (English)
Ul Delico (ウル・デリコ, Uru Deriko)
Voiced by: Rina Hidaka (Japanese); Shimba Tsuchiya (Japanese, adult); Sarah Ragsdale (English); Eduardo Vildasol (English, adult)
Raphael Delico (ラファエロ・デリコ, Rafaero Deriko)
Voiced by: Konomi Kohara (Japanese); Yūsuke Kobayashi (Japanese, adult); Madeleine Morris (English, child), Aaron Campbell (English, adult)
Angelico Fra (アンジェリコ・フラ, Anjeriko Fura)
Voiced by: Ayasa Itō (Japanese); Dani Chambers (English)
Lucia Lorca (ルチア・ロルカ, Ruchia Roruka)
Voiced by: Yū Wakui (Japanese); Leah Clark (English)
Elena Lorca (エレーナ・ロルカ, Erēna Roruka)
Voiced by: Sanae Fuku (Japanese); Molly Zhang (English)
Theodore Classico (テオドール・クラシコ, Teodōru Kurashiko)
Voiced by: Chika Anzai (Japanese); Kōki Uchiyama (Japanese, adult); Reshel Mae (English, child); David Matranga (English, adult)
Frieda Delico (フリーダ・デリコ, Furīda Deriko)
Voiced by: Ai Kayano (Japanese); Colleen Clinkenbeard (English)
Klaus (クラウス, Kurausu)
Voiced by: Shin-ichiro Miki (Japanese); Blake McNamara (English)
Keith (キース, Kīsu)
Voiced by: Yōhei Azakami (Japanese); Dallas Reid (English)
Julas (ジュラス, Jurasu)
Voiced by: Hikaru Midorikawa (Japanese); David Wald (English)
Katarina (カタリナ)
Voiced by: Makoto Yasumura (Japanese); Oscar Seung (English)
Abraham (アブラハム, Aburahamu)
Voiced by: Gentoku (Japanese); Davon Oliver (English)
Kiki (キキ)
Voiced by: Chinatsu Akasaki (Japanese); Kate Bristol (English)
Clara (クララ, Kurara)
Voiced by: Romi Park (Japanese); Linda K Leonard (English)
Johannes Vlad (ヨハネス・ヴラド, Yohanesu Vurado)
Voiced by: Taiten Kusunoki (Japanese); Jeremy Schwartz (English)
Ferdinand (フィルディナント, Ferudinanto)
Voiced by: Gentoku (Japanese); Sonny Franks (English)

==== Episodes ====
No.	Title	Directed by	Storyboarded by	Original release date
1	"Welcome to the Nursery"; Transliteration: "Yōkoso Nāsarī" (Japanese: ようこそナーサリー)	Hiroshi Nishikiori	Hiroshi Nishikiori	August 8, 2024
2	"Creeping Intrigue and Child-Rearing"; Transliteration: "Uzumaku Inbō to Ikuji" (Japanese: 渦巻く陰謀と育児)	Hiroshi Nishikiori	Hiroshi Nishikiori	August 15, 2024
3	"The Approaching Shadow"; Transliteration: "Shinobi Yoru Kage" (Japanese: しのびよる影)	Hiroshi Nishikiori	Hiroshi Nishikiori	August 22, 2024
4	"A Curse Called Love"; Transliteration: "Ai Toiu Na no Noroi" (Japanese: 愛という名の呪い)	Hiroshi Nishikiori	Hiroshi Nishikiori	August 29, 2024
5	"The Second Nursery"; Transliteration: "Dai Ni no Nāsarī" (Japanese: 第二のナーサリー)	Hiroshi Nishikiori	Seiko Sayama	September 5, 2024
6	"A Small Adventure"; Transliteration: "Chīsana Bōken" (Japanese: 小さな冒険)	Hiroshi Nishikiori	Seiko Sayama	September 12, 2024
6.5	"Recap"	Unknown	TBA	October 10, 2024
7	"Battle Amidst Flames"; Transliteration: "Enjō no Kōbō-sen" (Japanese: 炎上の攻防戦)	Hiroshi Nishikiori	Kanemori Yasuda	October 17, 2024
8	"Thus Spoke Juras"; Transliteration: "Jurasu wa Kaku Katariki" (Japanese: ジュラスはかく語りき)	Hiroshi Nishikiori	Seiko Sayama	October 24, 2024
9	"The Battle of Gray Cat Town"; Transliteration: "Haineko-gai no Kessen" (Japanese: 灰猫街の決戦)	Hiroshi Nishikiori	Seiko Sayama	October 31, 2024
10	"How to Kill God"; Transliteration: "Kamisama o Korosu Hōhō" (Japanese: 神さまを殺す方法)	Hiroshi Nishikiori	Seiko Sayama	November 7, 2024
11	"The Clan Festival"; Transliteration: "Kuran Fesuto" (Japanese: クランフェスト)	Hiroshi Nishikiori & Hiroyasu Oda	Kenichi Hamasaki & Kanemori Yasuda	November 14, 2024
12	"Sweet Dreams"; Transliteration: "Shiawase na Yume" (Japanese: しあわせな夢)	Hiroshi Nishikori	Nagai Shinpei & Nishikori Hiroshi	November 21, 2024
13	"Goodbye, Nursery"; Transliteration: "Sayonara Nāsari" (Japanese: さよならナーサリ―)	Hiroshi Nishikori	Hitoyuki Matsui & Hiroshi Nishikori	November 28, 2024

== See also ==
- Stage: Touken Ranbu, another stage play series created by Kenichi Suemitsu
