= Ren Ozawa =

Japanese actor

- 小澤 廉
- Born: August 12, 1991 (age 35); Kanagawa Prefecture, Japan
- Other name: Ozawaren
- Education: Meisei University
- Occupations: Actor; voice actor; singer
- Years active: 2013–2020; 2022–present
- Agents: Bacs Entertainment (2013–2019); Independent Works (2020); AIS (2020)
- Musical career
- Genres: J-pop
- Instrument: Vocals
- Member of: B2takes!
- Website: sp.ozawaren.com

Ren Ozawa (小澤 廉, Ozawa Ren; born August 12, 1991) is a Japanese actor and singer. After winning the Grand Prix prize at the Bacs Award 2013, he was signed to their agency and debuted with the boy band B2takes! His debut acting role is Rat in Kamen Rider Gaim (2013), and in the following years, he starred in the television dramas Dansui! (2017), Real Fake (2019), Aozakura: Bōei Daigakukō Monogatari (2019), and Chocolate Sensō (2020), as well as the films BD: Akechi Tantei Jimusho (2018) and Shinjuku Punch (2018). Ozawa also starred in several stage productions, including Ace of Diamond: The Live, the Hakuoki musicals, Osomatsu-san, Uta no Prince-sama, and Ensemble Stars!

== Career ==
Ozawa won the Grand Prix prize at the Bacs Award 2013, which jump-started his acting career. In November 2018, Ozawa left the boy band B2takes!!, and his graduation ceremony took place during the group's 6th anniversary concert.

Following domestic abuse reports in December 2020, Ozawa was dismissed from his agency. In September 2021, Ozawa stated through an interview with Shukan Bunshun that he had no plans on returning to entertainment. However, on October 8, 2022, Ozawa announced through his Twitter account that he was continuing his career. On June 24, 2023, Ozawa announced that he had rejoined B2takes! and would be performing under the stage name Ozawaren (written in roman letters).

== Personal life ==
=== Domestic abuse allegations ===
In December 2020, Shūkan Bunshun published allegations from his ex-girlfriend stating that Ozawa physically assaulted her throughout their 5-year relationship. The two began dating in 2015, beginning from when his ex-girlfriend was 16 years old, and moved in together in Setagaya, Tokyo in 2019 until she moved out in September 2020. Ozawa's ex-girlfriend alleged that he assaulted her regularly, especially during sexual intercourse, and that he had once forced her into getting an abortion after she became pregnant. On August 31, 2020, a neighbor called the police after hearing her being physically abused, but charges were not filed. On November 28, 2020, his ex-girlfriend attempted suicide before a friend intervened. On December 14, 2020, AIS, Ozawa's agency, terminated his contract, stating that he confirmed the reports. Subsequently, he was removed from upcoming projects, including the stage play adaptations of Le Petit Prince and Night Flight. The final episode of Kyouen NG, which he co-starred in, was originally scheduled to broadcast on December 14, 2020, but was delayed to December 19. In addition, his voice clips were removed from A3! and replaced by Tomoru Akazawa's. Ozawa issued a statement of regret on his Twitter account. He later followed up by denying his agency's statement and retweeting his lawyer but has since removed the tweets.

After months of silence, Ozawa returned to Twitter on August 12, 2021, posting on his 30th birthday a formal apology for troubling fans and colleagues. On August 30, 2021, through an interview with the magazine Weekly Josei Prime, Ozawa denied the allegations, saying that he never forced his ex-girlfriend into having an abortion nor hit her stomach, and their sexual acts consisted of BDSM with her consent. He also stated that she had physically assaulted him and drew a kitchen knife against him on November 28, 2020 after he had tried to relocate. Through an interview with Shūkan Bunshun, Ozawa also commented on the backlash regarding dating his ex-girlfriend when she was still a minor, stating that her family had given him consent to do so.

== Filmography ==
=== Television ===
Year	Title	Role	Network	Notes	Ref(s)
2013	Kamen Rider Gaim	Rat	TV Asahi	Supporting role	
2017	Dansui!	Mitsuki Taira	NTV	Supporting role	
2018	Pon!	Himself	NTV	Weather correspondent	
2018	Tabimate	Himself	Tokyo MX	Travelogue	
2019	Real Fake	Rin Sawase	MBS, TBS	Supporting role	
2019	Aozakura: Bōei Daigakukō Monogatari	Sōji Okita	MBS	Lead role	
2020	Chocolate Sensō	Tomoya Nishina	TVK	Lead role	
2020	A3! Season Spring & Summer	Kazunari Miyoshi	Tokyo MX, SUN, KBS Kyoto, BS11	Supporting role; voice in anime	
2020	Kyouen NG	Yūsuke Kaji	TV Tokyo	Supporting role	

=== Film ===
Year	Title	Role	Notes	Ref(s)
2014	Magic Night	Kaito	Supporting role	
2018	BD: Akechi Tantei Jimusho	Yoshio Kobayashi	Lead role	
2018	Shinjuku Punch	Hōsei Dōjō	Lead role	

=== Theater ===
Year	Title	Role	Notes	Ref(s)
2015	Ace of Diamond: The Live	Eijun Sawamura	Lead role	
2015	Musical Hakuoki Reimeiroku	Heisuke Tōdō	Supporting role	
2016	Musical Hakuoki Shinsengumi Kitan	Heisuke Tōdō	Supporting role	
2016	Fairy Tail	Lyon Vastia	Supporting role	
2016	Osomatsu-san	Jūshimatsu	Lead role	
2017	Dansui!	Mitsuki Taira	Supporting role	
2017	Gekidan Shining from Uta no Prince-sama: Tenka Muteki no Shinobu Michi	Otoya Ittoki	Lead role	
2017	100 Sleeping Princes and the Kingdom of Dreams: Prince Theater	Tiga	Lead role	
2018	Ensemble Stars!	Subaru Akehoshi	Lead role	
2018	Gekidan Shining from Uta no Prince-sama: Pirates of the Frontier	Ikki (Otoya Ittoki)	Lead role	
2020	Fire Force	Arthur Boyle	Supporting role	

=== Music video ===
Year	Artist	Song	Notes
2020	OxT	"Everlasting Dream"	

=== Video game ===
Year	Title	Role	Notes	Ref(s)
2017	A3!	Kazunari Miyoshi	Lead role	Voice removed on December 18, 2020

=== Drama CD ===
Year	Title	Role	Notes	Ref(s)
2020	Kore wa Ai de, Koi Janai			
