= Fermat Kitchen =

Japanese manga series

- First tankōbon volume cover

フェルマーの料理 (Ferumā no Ryōri)
- Genre: Cooking
- Manga
- Written by: Yūgo Kobayashi
- Published by: Kodansha
- Imprint: Monthly Shōnen Magazine Comics
- Magazine: Monthly Shōnen Magazine
- Original run: September 6, 2018 – present
- Volumes: 8
- Television drama

Fermat's Cuisine
- Directed by: Yasuharu Ishii; Shunichi Hirano; Maiko Ohuchi
- Written by: Yūsuke Watanabe; Kisa Miura
- Music by: Hideakira Kimura
- Studio: TBS
- Original network: JNN (TBS)
- Original run: October 20, 2023 – December 22, 2023
- Episodes: 10
- Anime television series
- Directed by: Kazuya Ichikawa
- Written by: Domerica
- Music by: Satoshi Igarashi
- Studio: Domerica
- Licensed by: NA: Remow; SA/SEA: Medialink
- Original network: ANN (TV Asahi)
- Original run: July 5, 2025 – September 27, 2025
- Episodes: 12
- icon

Fermat Kitchen (Japanese: フェルマーの料理, Hepburn: Ferumā no Ryōri; 'Fermat's Cuisine') is a Japanese manga series written and illustrated by Yūgo Kobayashi. It has been serialized in Kodansha's shōnen manga magazine Monthly Shōnen Magazine since September 2018. A television drama adaptation aired from October to December 2023. An anime television series adaptation produced by Domerica aired from July to September 2025.

== Characters ==
Gaku Kitada (北田 岳, Kitada Gaku)
Voiced by: Ryōsuke Tomita
Portrayed by: Fumiya Takahashi
A math genius who was recruited by Kai to work as a chef at Restaurant K. Gaku applies his mathematical talents into molecular gastronomy to learn more about cooking and develop his own recipes.
Kai Asakura (朝倉 海, Asakura Kai)
Voiced by: Taito Ban
Portrayed by: Jun Shison
A culinary prodigy serving as the charismatic, enigmatic owner of Restaurant K. Kai becomes Gaku's mentor after witnessing his unique potential in cooking. He suffers from dysgeusia in secret.
Ranna Akamatsu (赤松 蘭菜, Akamatsu Ranna)
Voiced by: Natsu Yorita
Portrayed by: Fuka Koshiba
The only female chef at Restaurant K who has a straightforward and cool personality.
Magoroku Inui (乾 孫六, Inui Magoroku)
Voiced by: Tatsumaru Tachibana
Portrayed by: Rihito Itagaki
A chef at Restaurant K who becomes close friends with Gaku.
Katsuya Hotei (布袋 勝也, Hotei Katsuya)
Voiced by: Daichi Endō
Portrayed by: Yoshihiko Hosoda
A sous-chef at Restaurant K and Kai's right-hand man.
Ayu Uomi (魚見 亜由, Uomi Ayu)
Voiced by: Anna Nagase
Portrayed by: Sei Shiraishi
Gaku's best friend and former classmate who is an aspiring swimmer.
Nene Fukuda (福田 寧々, Fukuda Nene)
Voiced by: Haruna Ikezawa
Portrayed by: Emma Miyazawa
A female waiter at Restaurant K and Kai's personal maid.
Katsuhiro Shibuya (渋谷 克洋, Shibuya Katsuhiro)
Portrayed by: Tōru Nakamura
Kai's mentor, who is a legendary chef in the culinary world.
Kagekatsu Saimon (西門 景勝, Saimon Kagekatsu)
Portrayed by: Mitsuhiro Oikawa
The ruthless chairman of Wels Academy and major investor of Restaurant K.
Isao Kitada (北田 勲, Kitada Isao)
Portrayed by: Takashi Ukaji
Gaku's father, who runs a bicycle shop.
Kagura Musashi (武蔵 神楽, Musashi Kagura)
Voiced by: Shion Wakayama
Portrayed by: Sayu Kubota
Gaku's childhood friend and former classmate.
Ichitarō Hirose (広瀬 一太郎, Hirose Ichitarō)
Voiced by: Makoto Furukawa
Portrayed by: Kanata Hosoda
Gaku's former classmate.
Milo Vivia (ウィヴィア・ミロ, Vivia Miro)
Voiced by: Takuma Nagatsuka

== Media ==
=== Manga ===
Written and illustrated by Yūgo Kobayashi, Fermat Kitchen started in Kodansha's shōnen manga magazine Monthly Shōnen Magazine on September 6, 2018. Kodansha has collected its chapters into individual tankōbon volumes. The first volume was released on June 28, 2019. As of June 30, 2026, eight volumes have been released.

==== Volumes ====
No.	Release date	ISBN
1	June 28, 2019	978-4-06-516296-5
2	July 30, 2020	978-4-06-520616-4
3	May 30, 2022	978-4-06-527610-5
4	September 28, 2023	978-4-06-533334-1
5	April 30, 2025	978-4-06-539001-6
6	August 29, 2025	978-4-06-540764-6
7	January 16, 2026	978-4-06-541577-1
8	June 30, 2026	978-4-06-543714-8

=== Drama ===
In August 2023, it was announced that the manga would receive a television drama adaptation titled in English as Fermat's Cuisine, which was broadcast on TBS from October 20 to December 22 of the same year. The theme song is "Re Houteishiki" (Re方程式) by 10-Feet.

=== Anime ===
In January 2025, it was announced that the manga will receive an anime television series adaptation. It is produced and written by Domerica and directed by Kazuya Ichikawa, with Takeshi Okamoto and Satsuki Kashiwagi designing the characters, and Satoshi Igarashi composing the music. The series aired from July 5 to September 27, 2025, on TV Asahi's IMAnimation programming block. The opening theme song is "Maillard" (メイラード, Meirādo), performed by Oshikikeigo, while the ending theme song is "Change Over", performed by DXTeen.

Remow licensed the series in North America for streaming on its "It's Anime" channel via Samsung TV Plus and YouTube. Medialink licensed the series in Asia-Pacific (except Australia and New Zealand) for streaming on Ani-One Asia's YouTube channel.

==== Episodes ====
No.	Title	Directed by	Storyboarded by	Original release date
1	"The Suspicious Man"; Transliteration: "Kuroi Otoko" (Japanese: 黒い男)	Miyuki Kaieda	Miyuki Kaieda, Natsuka Akagi & Shun Hanai	July 5, 2025
Gaku Kitada, a high school student at Wels Academy and aspiring mathematician, suffers a crisis of confidence during a Mathematical Olympiad. This humiliates the academy chairman, Saimon, and Gaku is forced to work in the school cafeteria to pay off his tuition. While cooking a staff meal of Naporitan, a suspicious man barges into the kitchen and eats his serving. The man, Kai Asakura, later cooks his own version of Naporitan for Gaku to point out that he is not utilizing his full potential. Gaku refuses to participate in an upcoming math competition, and is expelled from Wels, destroying his chances of getting into Tokyo University. Kai takes Gaku to a dinner party hosted by Saimon for several academy sponsors, where he is tasked with making Naporitan. Inspired by Kai's version of the dish and realizing that mathematical principles can be used in cuisine, Gaku deduces Kai's recipe and uses it to improve his own Naporitan. Kai is revealed to be the head chef at Restaurant K, a Michelin star French restaurant in Tokyo.
2	"The Door of Truth"; Transliteration: "Shinri no Tobira" (Japanese: 真理の扉)	Kumi Sato	Kumi Sato, Natsuka Akagi & Shun Hanai	July 12, 2025
The sponsors are impressed by the Naporitan, and Saimon is shocked to find out that Gaku cooked it. With the sponsors praising the quality of the school's education and resolving to increase funding, Saimon is forced to rescind Gaku's expulsion. Later, Gaku visits Kai's restaurant and meets Kai's personal maid Nene Fukuda and fellow chef Ranna Akamatsu. Gaku is made to explain the principles behind a dish Ranna makes for him. Impressed by his explanation, Kai tasks Gaku with cooking a main course for Giichi Musashi, a prospective sponsor of Restaurant K and member of the National Diet. Musashi happens to be the father of one of Gaku's childhood friends, Kagura, who won the silver medal in the Math Olympiad. Kai threatens to send Gaku away if his dish proves a disappointment.
3	"Challenge Gods with Cooking"; Transliteration: "Ryōri o Motte, Kami ni Idomu" (Japanese: 料理を以って、神に挑む)	Asuka Fukada	Asuka Fukada, Hiroki Fujii & Ayane Koyama	July 19, 2025
Kagura doubts that math and cuisine can be combined, but Kai convinces her to try Gaku's cooking. His dish impresses Kagura and changes her opinion on Gaku, after having dismissed his thinking as boring. Gaku asks to be allowed to work at Restaurant K when he graduates from high school, putting off his plans to attend university. Months later, Gaku graduates from Wels Academy and leaves to pursue cooking in Tokyo with his father's support.
4	"Unprecedented and Unparalleled"; Transliteration: "Izen Igo" (Japanese: 以前以後)	Makiko Ōtsuka	Makiko Ōtsuka, Natsuka Akagi & Shun Hanai	July 26, 2025
Kai lets Gaku stay in his apartment, again threatening to dismiss him if he disappoints him. Kai cooks yet another version of Naporitan that shows Gaku how far away he is from culinary excellence. In order to be considered a full-fledged member of Restaurant K's staff, Gaku has a week to earn the approval of the other members through his staff meals. However, Gaku is still expected to participate in daily kitchen duties, and struggles to keep up because of his inexperience and poor stamina.
5	"Homesickness and Cooking"; Transliteration: "Nosutarujī to ryōri" (Japanese: ノスタルジーと料理)	Miyuki Kaieda	Miyuki Kaieda & Ayane Sakura	August 9, 2025
Gaku's initial attempts at the staff meal fail to impress his colleagues. After sharing a meal with one of his former schoolmates, Ayu Uomi, Gaku is inspired to follow the movements of the dishes, allowing him to keep pace with the other chefs. Realizing that most of Restaurant K's staff are foreigners, Gaku resolves to create a staff meal that can surpass the feeling of homesickness.
6	"Overlapping Phenomenon"; Transliteration: "Kasanaru Jishō" (Japanese: 重なる事象)	Kumi Satō	Kumi Satō, Hiroki Fujii & Tomoha Fushimi	August 16, 2025
Gaku's dish satisfies even foreign palates, earning him the approval of the staff. Despite working for several weeks as a full-fledged member of Restaurant K, Kai refuses to let him cook for customers because of his mathematical incompetence. Gaku has a nightmare about Ichitarō Hirose, the gold-medal winner of the Math Olympiad who looks down on him. Kai realizes Hirose is the winner of a prestigious mathematics award, the ceremony for which Restaurant K will be catering. Eager to push Gaku to his limits, Kai ignores the distress Gaku feels about Hirose and tells him to serve a dish during the event. Meanwhile, Hirose contacts Kagura, expressing his excitement to see her and Gaku again at the event.
7	"Dream"; Transliteration: "Yume" (Japanese: 夢)	Asuka Fukada	Asuka Fukada, Natsuka Akagi & Hatsune Taniguchi	August 23, 2025
Gaku meets with Kagura at her university and discusses his feelings of unease about cooking for Hirose. Kagura reveals that Gaku inspired her to take joy in math in their childhood, and tells him not to let his apprehension toward Hirose take away his joy. For the award ceremony catering, Kai allows his less senior chefs to try out for the opportunity to serve their own dishes for the appetizer, soup, and meat courses. While his colleagues apply to compete for one course each, Gaku applies for all three.
8	"Passionate Competition"; Transliteration: "Atsuki Konpetishon" (Japanese: 熱きコンペティション)	Makiko Ōtsuka	Makiko Ōtsuka & Natsuka Akagi	August 30, 2025
Kai and his senior chefs judge the dishes the others serve. Gaku learns about how his colleagues were either compelled by Kai's cooking to work under him, or offered work when he tried their cooking. Gaku serves a three-part dish with each part complementing the prior, all of which serve as their own courses.
9	"The Equation's Collapse"; Transliteration: "Hōteishiki no Hōkai" (Japanese: 方程式の崩壊)	Moe Sasaki	Moe Sasaki	September 6, 2025
Despite impressing the judges with his dish, Gaku is given the responsibility of serving dessert during the award ceremony. With such a short time to learn baking, Gaku falls into a deep depression. Kai explains that Gaku's three-part dish was not made using his math skills, and acts like he assigned the dessert on a whim. In response, Gaku runs away, intending to return to his hometown. Hirose proposes marriage to Kagura, hoping they can pursue mathematics together with Gaku as his assistant.
10	"A Dialogue with Darkness"; Transliteration: "Yami to no Taiwa" (Japanese: 闇との対話)	Moe Sasaki	Moe Sasaki	September 13, 2025
Kai's sous-chef Katsuya Hotei confronts him about isolating himself in pursuit of culinary excellence, as well as putting pressure on Gaku for the same goal, but Kai defends his training methods. Hotei deduces that Kai wants Gaku to study baking because of the emphasis on numbers and attention to detail required by the discipline. Gaku receives a thesis written by Hirose that makes him realize how lonely experts must feel to be at the top in their fields, compelling him to return to Restaurant K. While training to be a pâtissier, Gaku eats a desert made by Kai and enters a fugue state.
11	"Opening Ceremony"; Transliteration: "Shikiten no Kaimaku" (Japanese: 式典の開幕)	Moe Sasaki	Kumi Sato & Yuya Sugiyama	September 20, 2025
Gaku obsessively purchases and experiments with expensive ingredients, and takes time off to scout for natural ingredients in his hometown. His delirium persists even during the award ceremony, to his colleagues' concern. Hotei recognizes that Gaku has risen to a level of focus similar to Hirose and Kai, refusing to bother with anything or anyone outside his craft. Kai considers Gaku's loneliness and isolation as acceptable costs of pursuing culinary excellence. With Kai's help, Gaku prepares his dessert to serve during the ceremony.
12	"Fermat's Kitchen"; Transliteration: "Ferumā no Ryōri" (Japanese: フェルマーの料理)	Miyuki Kaieda	Miyuki Kaieda & Yuya Sugiyama	September 27, 2025
Gaku's dessert is a hit with the guests, and he explains how he incorporated mathematical principles into his cooking. Hirose acknowledges that Gaku is worthy of admiration as a chef, and abandons his intentions to marry Kagura and have Gaku work under him. Kai resolves to keep pushing Gaku deeper into despair and mental instability in the name of cooking, while Gaku hopes to continue growing as a pâtissier.

== Reception ==
By December 2023, the manga had over 500,000 copies in circulation.

The series was nominated for the 49th Kodansha Manga Award in the shōnen category in 2025.

== See also ==
- Aoashi, another manga series by the same author
