= Seven Knights =

2014 video game

- Video game
- Developer: Netmarble Nexus
- Publisher: Netmarble
- Genre: Role-playing game
- Platform: Android, iOS
- Released: KOR: March 2014; WW: November 2015
- Video game

Seven Knights 2
- Developer: Netmarble Nexus
- Publisher: Netmarble
- Genre: Role-playing game
- Engine: Unreal Engine 4
- Platform: Android, iOS, Microsoft Windows
- Released: Mobile (iOS and Android): WW: November 2020; Microsoft Windows: WW: November 2021; (Beta)
- Video game

Seven Knights Revolution
- Developer: Netmarble Nexus
- Publisher: Netmarble
- Genre: MMORPG
- Engine: Unreal Engine 4
- Platform: Android, iOS, Microsoft Windows
- Released: KOR: July 2022
- Video game

Seven Knights Re:Birth
- Developer: Netmarble Nexus
- Publisher: Netmarble
- Genre: Role-playing game
- Engine: Unreal Engine 5
- Platform: Android, iOS, Microsoft Windows
- Released: KR: May 15, 2025; WW: September 18, 2025
- Anime television series

Seven Knights Revolution: Hero Successor
- Directed by: Kazuya Ichikawa
- Written by: Ukyō Kodachi
- Music by: Yoshiaki Fujisawa
- Studio: Liden Films; Domerica
- Licensed by: Crunchyroll; SEA: Muse Communication
- Original network: Tokyo MX, BS11, KBS Kyoto, SUN
- Original run: April 5, 2021 – June 21, 2021
- Episodes: 12

Seven Knights (Korean: 세븐나이츠; RR: Sebeun Naicheu, Japanese: セブンナイツ, romanized: Sebun Naitsu) is a series of online free-to-play role-playing games created by Netmarble. The first game was released for Android and iOS devices in March 2014 in South Korea and in February 2016 worldwide. A realistic sequel mobile game Seven Knights 2 was released in November 2020, in addition to having a Microsoft Windows version's beta was released a month later in 2021 before the version's full release. A massively multiplayer online role-playing game Seven Knights Revolution was released in South Korea in July 2022.

An anime television series adaptation by Liden Films and Domerica titled Seven Knights Revolution: Hero Successor aired from April 5 to June 21, 2021.

A remake version of the first game, The Seven Knights or Seven Knights Re:Birth was announced on March 2, 2023, after the announcement of service termination of the first game global services. Follow the same story line of the first game, but change main character view to Four Emperor Lord, Ace. It was built on latest version of Unreal Engine 5, with using same character design and pixel shadder of Seven Knight Revolution. It was planned to launch globally on the first half of 2025, but Netmarble decided to release Seven Knight Re:Birth only in South Korea in May 15, 2025. This is a result of a remaster version of the first game that Netmarble Nexus was announced in 2022.

== Anime premise ==
Long ago, the evil goddess Nestra and her cult, Physis, attempted to destroy the world until they were stopped by the Seven Knights, warriors chosen by the goddess Serrass. Generations later, the Seven Knights are worshipped as heroes by Granseed Academy, an institution that trains the next generation of warriors. Granseed's student council is the next generation of Seven Knights, and they channel the power of the original heroes through the process of Succession, which bonds the soul of the current hero with the soul of the original hero with a special card. This new generation of Seven Knights enters into conflict with Physis, which is spreading its influence throughout the world yet again.

== Characters ==
Rachel Agni (レイチェル・アグニ, Reicheru Aguni)
Voiced by: Satomi Arai (Japanese); Stephanie Sheh (English)
Member of the original Seven Knights. She gifts Shirley with the power of fire.
Spike (スパイク, Supaiku)
Voiced by: Kentarō Itō (Japanese); Doug Erholtz (English)
Member of the original Seven Knights. She gifts Joe with the power of ice.
Vanessa (ヴァネッサ, Vuanessa)
Voiced by: Yukari Tamura
Controller of time and member of the original Seven Knights. She gifts Ellen with the ability to predict the future and manipulate the flow of time.
Jave (ジェイブ, Jeibu)
Voiced by: Rica Matsumoto (Japanese); Todd Haberkorn (English)
A dragon knight and member of the original Seven Knights. He gifts Gildan with a suit of draconic armor.
Kris (クリス, Kurisu)
Voiced by: Toshiyuki Morikawa (Japanese); Matthew Mercer (English)
The Dark Ruler and member of the original Seven Knights. He gifts Gareth with a sword with the power of darkness.

=== Anime exclusive ===
Nemo (ネモ)
Voiced by: Daiki Yamashita
The protagonist of the series. A polite and humble boy who is the sole survivor from Ulley Village, which was destroyed by Physis-infected monsters. He is inducted into Granseed Academy by Faria after she saves his life and he bonds with the soul of a Knight, who is later revealed to be Jenius. He is later revealed to be a homunculus created by Amis Germain in an attempt to turn him into the Son of Destruction, destined to bring about the arrival of the God of Destruction. However, the spirit of Jenius inspired the homunculus to escape to a human town, where he killed a boy named Nemo, assumed his form and stole his memories. He is lethally injured by a corrupted Gareth but Ellen saves his life and he is visited by the spirit of the original Nemo, who forgives him for his own death and motivates him to protect the people he cares about. His weapon is a gauntlet grappling hook connected to a blade, which he can turn into Jenius' most powerful weapon, the Legis Breaker, an energy cannon with enormous destructive power. In his final battle with Sophitia, he remembers that the original Nemo actually sacrificed his life to save him, and the homunculus devoured him and assumed his form as a way to honor him. He and Jenius combine the last of their powers to recreate the Book of Time and trap Sophitia and the powers of darkness within it yet again, at the cost of completely extinguishing Jenius' soul and rendering Nemo a powerless human. Even without his powers, though, Nemo decides to remain by Faria's side and they embark on a journey in order to find a way to destroy the Book of Time and prevent its misuse.
Faria (ファリア)
Voiced by: Hibiku Yamamura
President of Granseed Academy's student council and leader of the new Seven Knights. Her soul is bonded to that of her ancestor, Yunomia, one of the original Seven Knights. Her weapon is a double-bladed axe spear. She saves Nemo's life and welcomes him to Granseed to begin his training as a warrior. She is very serious and dedicated to her work, but she is can also be friendly and warm whenever she isn't concerned with her duty. Her feelings for Nemo grow to the point that she is willing to risk her own life to prevent his execution, based on false evidence. She becomes infected by the power of destruction sealed within Granseed's old library in her attempts to save Nemo, but she doesn't care, as she has decided to protect Nemo by her own free will. She helps Nemo fight Sophitia, the true leader of Physis, and bears witness at how Nemo recreates the Book of Time and traps Sophitia within it, at the cost of losing his Succession powers. With the dark power sealed, Faria is freed from her curse and she reaffirms her desire to stay by Nemo's side. She resigns her position at Granseed and joins Nemo in a journey in order to find a way to destroy the Book of Time and prevent its misuse.
Ellen (エレン)
Voiced by: Kana Hanazawa
Faria's personal valet and member of the new Seven Knights. Her soul is bonded to that of Vanessa and she has the power to predict the future and manipulate the flow of time. Since childhood, she had trouble making friends before meeting Faria because she unwittingly predicted their deaths, to the point she believes she predicted the date of the end of the world, as she could no longer see the future beyond that point. She knows that Shirley is a vampire and has been allowing her to drink her blood in order to satiate her thirst. In the battle against Amis Germain, she nullifies his powers using temporal magic, a feat that leaves her physically exhausted. Fortunately, she had safeguarded a portion of the sand used by the silver hourglasses, mystical artifacts that can control the flow of time, and uses it to save Nemo's life, but this act nearly kills her and in order to save her, Shirley turns Ellen into a vampire.
Gareth (ガレス, Garesu)
Voiced by: Yūichirō Umehara
An elf from the Winswald clan and member of the new Seven Knights. His home was destroyed by Physis, making him very determined into exterminating them. Despite his stoic personality, he genuinely appreciates his friends and does whatever he can to help them. He tries to investigate Granseed's old library, believing it to be connected to Physis in some way, but inadvertently gets his schoolmate Claire killed. Guilt-ridden, he promises to hunt down her killer. While his fellow Knights attack Physis' main fortress, Gareth investigates Granseed's old academy and finds it infested with Physis monsters. After defeating the monsters, he receives information from Sophitia about the old library. Upon learning about Nemo's origins, he orders his arrest and even becomes tempted to kill him but ultimately decides to his wait to be decided by the proper judgment. Unfortunately, the dark power sealed within the old library threatens to cause a global disturbance, causing an enraged Gareth to ask Sophitia to give him the power to kill Nemo, believing him to be the cause of the disaster. Gareth becomes corrupted by Sophitia's power and lethally injures Nemo before being seemingly killed by Sophitia herself. Thanks to his powers over darkness, however, Gareth survives and helps his fellow Knights defeat Sophitia and defend Granseed as a form of atonement for his previous betrayal. After the final battle, he makes a full recovery and rejoins his friends.
Joe (ジョウ, Jō)
Voiced by: Shunsuke Takeuchi
Member of the Seven Knights, bonded to the soul of Spike. He is obsessed with physical strength and constantly trains to become strong after his father died fighting Physis-infected monsters. He has a crush on Sophitia, who seduces him in an attempt to use him for her goals. He is corrupted by Sophitia's power, forcing Gildan to fight him. Fortunately, Gidan is able to bring him back to his senses and Joe helps in the defense of Granseed against Sophitia.
Gildan (ギルダン, Girudan)
Voiced by: Yuya Hozumi
A prince of a country populated by beastmen and member of the Seven Knights, bonded to the soul of Jave. On a training session, his succession goes badly and he is consumed by his own draconic armor until he is saved by the combined efforts of Nemo, Jou, and Gareth. Grateful, Gareth becomes a firm ally to Nemo, refusing to believe he works for Physis and attempting to vouch for his innocence. When Reda reveals that Sophitia is part of Physis, Gildan is forced to fight Joe, who has been corrupted by Sophitia's power. Fortunately, he is able to bring Joe back to his senses and both help in defending the school against Sophitia's destructive power.
Shirley (シャーリー, Shārī)
Voiced by: Manami Numakura
President of Granseed's disciplinary board and member of the Seven Knights, bonded to the soul of Rachel Agni. She is a vampire hailing from a family of pacifists that never harmed humans. Unfortunately, her family was killed and she was forced to escape to Granseed for her own safety. Only Ellen and Nemo know about her true identity and allow her to drink their blood as a form of friendship. Shirley is later implied to develop feelings for Ellen beyond the need to drink her blood. Her weapon is a rapier. Although vampires are naturally vulnerable to fire, Shirley developed some resistance to it thanks to her bond with Rachel. When Nemo's true identity as a homunculus is revealed, she is conflicted about her feelings on the matter until she decides to help Gildan vouch for Nemo's innocence. When Reda reveals that Sophitia is part of Physis, she agrees to take part in the effort to stop Sophitia. She is aware of Ellen's time magic and that it drains her life force every time she uses it, so she makes Ellen drink a portion of her blood to turn her into a vampire and save her life.
Jenius (ジェニウス, Jeniusu)
Voiced by: Takahiro Sakurai
Member of the original Seven Knights. He bonded his soul to Nemo, granting him a suit of armor equipped with a hook-blade and an energy cannon. According to legend, Jenius sold his soul to Physis and set Granseed's old library on fire before being killed by Yunomia, but this was a fabrication. In reality, Jenius created the Book of Time, a special seal around the library to prevent the power of destruction from spreading across the world, and only allowed the lies about him to be remembered because the book's seal was imperfect. His spirit endured, however, and inspired the homunculus Nemo to escape from Amis Germain's base. For the most part, Jenius does not speak freely to Nemo, only speaking him during critical moments. In the final battle against Sophitia, the true leader of Physis, he and Nemo combine the last of their power to recreate the Book of Time, at the cost of completely extinguishing Jenius' spirit.
Yunomia (ユーノミア, Yūnomia)
Voiced by: Yū Shimamura
Member of the original Seven Knights and Faria's ancestor. She gifts Faria with the power of electricity. According to legend, she is the one who killed Jenius after he burned Granseed's old library to the ground before dying in battle herself, but this was a fabrication. In reality, she witnessed Jenius create the Book of Time in order to prevent the power of destruction from spreading and only allowed the lies about Jenius to be remembered because the seal on the Book of Time was imperfect. Even in her spirit form, she is infected with a curse that crystallized part of her right arm. She agrees to help Faria discover the truth about Jenius and the old library but warns her that Faria's life will be in danger, as well.
Leda (レダ, Reda)
Voiced by: Yumiri Hanamori
A Successor working for Physis and member of the Sons of Destruction. She is a homunculus created to control the soul of Irene and possesses the power of electricity. At first, she loses control of her power, but Irene fully bonds her soul with Reda, allowing her to survive and join Nemo's side to fight Germain. She is horrified upon learning that Germain created her and her fellow homunculi to be disposable pawns in his plans and never really cared for them, and so she chooses to help the Seven Knights defeat him. After that, however, she goes into hiding, until she crosses paths with Faria and believes Faria will try to arrest her. During their battle, Reda digs deeper into Irene's power and manifests a sword with the power of fire. Ultimately, Faria spares her life and they both agree to stop Sophitia. In the final battle, she helps the Seven Knights defend Granseed from Sophitia's monster form and she is accepted as a new student.
Germane (ジェルマン, Jeruman)
Voiced by: Hidekatsu Shibata
Leader of Physis. He used to be an important figure in the empire until he lost faith in the world and humanity and took control of Physis. By destroying silver hourglasses, mystical artifacts that can control the flow of time, throughout the continent, he has absorbed their power and gained the ability to control time, as well. As the Seven Knights storm his fortress, he nearly overpowers them, but Ellen, a fellow temporal mage, nullifies his powers, allowing Nemo to defeat him. He is finally destroyed by Sophitia, the true leader of Physis, who reveals she has been manipulating him for her own plans of destruction.
Castor (カストル, Kasutoru)
Voiced by: Eiji Miyashita
A Successor working for Physis and member of the Sons of Destruction. He is a homunculus created to control the soul of Dellons Snolde Black Scythe and possesses enormous physical strength. He later loses control of his power and gets killed by Nemo and Shirley.
Pollux (ボリュクス, Boryukusu)
Voiced by: Haruki Ishiya
A Successor working for Physis and member of the Sons of Destruction. He is a homunculus created to control the soul of Mercure and possesses the power of black magic. He loses control of his power and begs Germain to save him, only to be betrayed and killed by his own leader.
Sophitia (ソフィーティア, Sofītia)
Voiced by: Kikuko Inoue
Librarian of Granseed Academy. A kind woman who helps and gives advice to heroes. Joe admires her very much. After Germanin was defeated by Nemo, it is revealed that Sophitia is the true leader of Physis, who was manipulating Germain the entire time, with the goal of bringing about the end of the world. She originally lived during the age of the original Seven Knights, until she was killed by Jenius, but she survived by transferring her soul into multiple bodies until she could enact her plans of destruction. In her original life, she was acquainted with the original Seven Knights and had feelings for Jenius, but she ultimately felt disappointed that the world did not change, despite the Seven Knights' best efforts, which motivated her plans to merge with the Book of Time and cause global destruction. Nemo and Jenius are barely able to stop her rampage by recreating the Book of Time and sealing her within it.

== Anime adaptation ==
On February 4, 2021, Netmarble announced an anime television series adaptation titled Seven Knights Revolution: Hero Successor (セブンナイツ レボリューション -英雄の継承者-, Sebun Naitsu Reboryūshon: Eiyū no Keishōsha; "Seven Knights Revolution: The Hero's Successor") and produced by Liden Films and Domerica. The series is directed by Kazuya Ichikawa, with scripts overseen by Ukyō Kodachi, character designs handled by Arisa Matsuura, and music composed by Yoshiaki Fujisawa. It aired from April 5 to June 21, 2021, on Tokyo MX and other channels. Flumpool performed the series' opening theme song "Freeze", while Daiki Yamashita performed the series' ending theme song "Tail". Muse Communication has licensed the series in South East Asia and the anime is scheduled to be streamed on their YouTube channel. Crunchyroll licensed the series outside Asia.

No.	Title	Directed by	Written by	Original release date
1	"Awakening -Succession-"; Transliteration: "Mezame-Sakuseshon-" (Japanese: 目醒-サクセション-)	Kiyoshi Murayama	Ukyō Kodachi	April 5, 2021
Faria and Ellen investigate a town destroyed by Physis-infected monsters. A nearby town, Ulley Village, is attacked by monsters, as well, with only a young boy Nemo as the sole survivor. Nemo is surrounded by monsters until he is saved by Faria, who notices that Nemo is wearning the uniform of Granseed Academy. She takes him to the Granseed train and explains to him the story of the Seven Knights, legendary heroes who saved the world from the evil god Nestra. Suddenly, the train is attacked by a huge Physis monster, which injures both Faria and Ellen. Even with her mightiest attacks, Faria is unable to stop the monster and asks Nemo to take Ellen and run. Nemo, however, refuses to abandon Faria and is suddenly transported to the garden of Serrass, the goddess that chose the original Seven Knights. Nemo asks Serrass to give him the power to save Faria and Serrass bonds Nemo's soul to the soul of one of the original Seven Knights. Nemo only manages a form an incomplete Succession but is able to recover Faria's weapon and together, they slay the monster. With the battle over, Faria and Ellen welcome Nemo to Granseed Academy.
2	"Chance Encounter -Granseed-"; Transliteration: "Kaikō-Guranshīdo-" (Japanese: 邂逅-グランシード-)	Mika Tomiya	Ukyō Kodachi	April 12, 2021
As Nemo begins his life at Granseed Academy, he becomes acquainted to the academy's student council, the current generation of the Seven Knights. One of the Knights, Joe, captured a Physis-infected dragon in ice and brought it to the academy for study. In a student council meeting, Faria announces Nemo to be the newest member of the Seven Knights, a decision met with confusion from other Knights. Faria tasks Joe with taking Nemo on a tour across the academy, where Nemo meets Sophitia, the academy's librarian. Nemo is assigned in the student council's dorm, alongside Faria and Ellen. The next day, Gareth asks Nemo to take a vial with elf medicine to the Alchemy Research Institute. Suddenly, the dragon captured by Joe breaks free from its prison and wreaks havoc across the academy. Joe tries to fight the dragon on his own while Nemo takes Sophitia and a group of students to safety, but when the dragon proves capable of healing from its injuries, Nemo returns to help Joe. Nemo completes his Succession and restrains the dragon, allowing Joe to kill it. Much later, Shirley talks with Faria about the latter's decision to place Nemo in the student council's dorm and Faria admits that she is monitoring Nemo because she is afraid of his power.
3	"Hero -Seven Knights-"; Transliteration: "Eiyū-Sebun Naitsu-" (Japanese: 英雄-セブンナイツ-)	Hisashi Ishii	Ukyō Kodachi	April 19, 2021
In a strategy meeting, Faria informs her fellow Knights that the increased activity of Physis has caused Granseed to receive new funds from foreign countries. Nemo has a dream in which Granseed is consumed by flames and the hero he is bonded to tries to warn Nemo about something, but Nemo is unable to understand the meaning of the dream before Faria wakes him up and tells him to get ready for a new mission: an expedition to a floating island has been attacked by Physis and the Seven Knights have been sent to protect it. During the battle, Gildan runs out of magical power, forcing him to retreat, but the other Knights successfully complete the mission. Later that night, Gildan loses control over his magical power and turns into a monster. Gareth and Joe believe they may have to kill Gildan, but Nemo begs them to save him instead. With some encouragement from Jabe, Gildan regains enough of his consciousness for the other Knights to save him. Nemo is left unconscious after the battle and as he wakes up, he finds Faria tending to his injuries.
4	"Friendship -Connection-"; Transliteration: "Yūgi-Konekushon-" (Japanese: 友誼-コネクション-)	Mitsuyo Yokono	Kō Shigenobu	April 26, 2021
Faria reveals to Nemo that he's been asleep for a full day after what happened with Gildan, but she doesn't feel that Nemo hasn't fully recovered, so she decides to take care of him for the rest of the day. Meanwhile, Gareth reveals his suspicions of a Physis infiltrator within Granseed to Jou and Gildan. Ellen tells Nemo that Faria is particularly dedicated to his well-being because she wants to make up for failing to save Ulley Village from Physis. The other Knights attempt to spend some time with Nemo, who tells them that he's been unable to communicate with his heroic spirit and he doesn't even know the hero's name and Joe advises him to talk Sophitia in order to learn about his hero. Unfortunately, Faria's pet cat escapes from her room and Faria asks for Nemo's help in capturing her, as pets aren't allowed within school grounds. They ultimately find the cat stuck in the dorm's rooftop but run the risk of slipping off and falling. Fortunately, Nemo channels his heroic spirit and saves Faria, who later gets warned by Yunomia that a great tempest is coming and only the new Seven Knights can stop it. The next day, Nemo goes to the library and asks Sophitia to teach him about his hero.
5	"Rampancy -Physis-"; Transliteration: "Chōryō-Pyushisu-" (Japanese: 跳梁-ピュシス-)	Yūshi Ibe	Kiyomune Miwa	May 3, 2021
Nemo explains to Sophitia that he's been unable to communicate with his heroic spirit, which is why he's asking for her help. Unfortunately, even after a day of research and study, Sophitia is unable to find anything about Nemo's hero. Nemo later becomes aware of a series of attacks on Granseed students performed by a vampire, possibly with ties to Physis. Feeling responsible, Shirley becomes determined to find the culprit and Nemo offers assistance, as well. As they work together, Shirley admits her own distrust towards Nemo but decides to put that aside in favor of the task at hand. Nemo also gains the assistance of Mina, a member of Granseed's disciplinary committee, to find the culprit. As they explore the forest surrounding the academy, Nemo and Mina find Shirley drinking Ellen's blood, confirming that she is a vampire. Mina is convinced that Shirley is the culprit, but Nemo wants to hear Shirley out. A fight breaks out, but Nemo refuses to fight back and Shirley explains that she hails from a family of pacifistic vampires. Her family was destroyed and she was forced to run away and hide her identity for her own safety. Nemo believes that Shirley didn't attack the other students, so he promises to keep her secret. As they return to Granseed, however, they find that Physis monsters have kidnapped Ellen. They track them down to an abandoned cathedral, where they discover that not only is Mina the vampire behind the attacks, but she is also a mole for Physis, as well. She is helping Physis in order to create a world where vampires are no longer persecuted and offer Shirley to join her, but Shirley refuses and fights Mina, while Nemo destroys the monsters. Shirley holds Mina in place with her fire powers, giving Nemo enough time to incinerate her. With Ellen safe, Shirley thanks Nemo for his help and drinks some of his blood.
6	"Holiday -Festival-"; Transliteration: "Shukusai-Fesutibaru-" (Japanese: 祝祭-フェスティバル-)	Kiyoshi Murayama	Kō Shigenobu	May 10, 2021
As Gareth investigates the deceased Mina's room, Sophitia tells Nemo that the academy's old library and most of its records were destroyed in a fire a long time ago. Rumor has it that Jenius, the head librarian at the time, was a double agent working for Physis and it was Yunomia who defeated him. Shortly afterward, a student called Claire offers her help to Gareth in order to investigate the old library, but he declines. The next day, preparations for the school festival begin and students begin looking for partners for the school dance. Faria deduces that Claire has feelings for Gareth and encourages her to ask him to be her partner for the dance, while Shirley asks Nemo to be her partner. Claire offers her help to Gareth yet again, even though he has no way of repaying her, so Claire tells him that in exchange for her help, he will be her dance partner, to which Gareth reluctantly agrees. As the school festival begins, the Seven Knights set up a café to entertain the other students. Faria asks Nemo to be her dance partner, to which he replies that Shirley already asked him to be her partner. Nemo gets placed in an awkward position, as the two girls want him to decide to who does he want as his partner, but Nemo ultimately asks for more time to make his decision. As he brings food to Sophitia, he admits that he doesn't really understand love. Sophitia tells him that love is a complicated emotion that can be manifested in multiple ways and, perhaps, it might be easier for people in general if they could love everyone equally. Nemo deduces that Ellen was the one Shirley wanted to be her partner and tells Shirley that she should ask Ellen about it. The night dance begins and Nemo dances with Faria, while Shirley ultimately chooses Ellen as her partner. Meanwhile, Claire investigates the old library's ruins and stumbles upon an abandoned chamber with a mysterious book. As soon as she touches the book, she becomes infected with a mysterious dark force. Claire returns to the academy in time for her dance with Gareth, but her body crystallizes and falls apart, much to Gareth's horror.
7	"Sortie -Apocalypse-"; Transliteration: "Shutsugeki-Apokaripusu-" (Japanese: 出撃-アポカリプス-)	Fumio Maezono	Ukyō Kodachi	May 17, 2021
Granseed's student body holds a funeral for Claire and Gareth, who still blames himself for her death, only watches the funeral from a distance and promises to find her killer. Meanwhile, Granseed's leadership is preparing an all-out offensive against a large Physis facility found beneath the Burgot Volcano, where Yunomia previously defeated Physis. According to Granseed's leadership, Physis is gathering magical energy generated from the cities they destroyed throughout the continent at the underground facility, and their leader, Amis Germane, will be present, as well. The Seven Knights prepare for the mission, but Gareth won't partake in this operation, as he wants to continue exploring Granseed's old library. Yunomia asks Faria that she reveals the truth about the old library after the battle is over. The offensive on the Physis begins, with Joe and Gildan leading the frontlines and Nemo, Faria, Ellen, and Shirley breaking directly into the base. Faria tasks Ellen to assist Joe and Gildan, while Faria, Nemo, and Shirley go deeper into the base's lower levels. The three Knights reach a chamber used to create homunculi, where they are attacked by Reda, Castor, and Pollux, evil warriors who have been gifted the power of Succession by the goddess Nestra. The evil Successors initially gain the upper hand by separating the Knights and fighting them individually, but the Knights even odds by regrouping and fighting together. The battle takes a turn for the worse, however, when Germane infuses his Successors with the dark power of destruction, enhancing their abilities. Meanwhile, Gildan finds an altar dedicated to Physis at Granseed's old library, but he is suddenly attacked by Physis monsters.
8	"Rivalry -Conflict-"; Transliteration: "Sōkoku-Konfurikuto-" (Japanese: 相克-コンフリクト-)	Masayuki Iimura	Kō Shigenobu	May 24, 2021
The evil Successors, calling themselves the "Sons of Destruction", reveal that they obtained their powers not by willingly bonding their souls to ancient heroes, but by subjugating those heroes to their will, making them little more than tools. Nemo tricks Castor and Pollux into attacking each other, which gives the Knights an opening to fight back. Suddenly, the heroes controlled by the Sons of Destruction begin to fight back the Sons' control, and the Sons' power becomes unstable. Nemo and Shirley destroy Castor while Pollux runs away, leaving Reda alone against the Knights. Reda wants to fight Nemo on her own, a challenge he accepts while Faria and Shirley go on ahead. As Nemo fights Reda, he implies that he is a homunculus, just like she is, but he chose a different path and she can do it, too. Nemo defeats Reda, but Irene, Reda's heroic spirit, responds to Reda's feelings and willingly bonds her soul to that of Reda. Nemo offers Reda the opportunity to fight Germain alongside him and she accepts. Pollux begs Germain to save him, only to be killed in return. Faria and Shirley reach Germain's chamber, but he reveals that Physis has destroyed silver hourglasses, mystical artifacts that can control the flow of time, and by absorbing their power, he, too, can control time, as well, which allows him to deflect and reverse the Knights' attacks. Meanwhile, Gareth continues fighting the Physis monsters inside Granseed's old library, until he gets some unexpected assistance from Sophitia. After defeating the monsters, Gareth and Sophitia find a secret book within the old library and discover a dark secret about Nemo.
9	"Conclusion -End Times-"; Transliteration: "Shūen-Endo Taimuzu-" (Japanese: 終焉-エンドタイムズ-)	Kiyoshi Murayama	Kō Shigenobu	May 31, 2021
Nemo and Reda arrive just in time to assist Faria and Shirley in fighting Germain, while the Granseed army destroys the Physis monsters and makes preparations for a special ritual under Ellen's instructions. Germain proclaims Nemo to be the true Son of Destruction and that Reda and the other homunculi were just disposable pawns in his plans, a revelation that enrages Reda and causes her to attack Germain. Unfortunately, Germain proves to be too strong for the four united warriors and attempts to steal Nemo's life force in order to turn him into the Son of Destruction. However, Ellen, having manifested her heroic spirit, arrives at the battlefield and uses her powers to stop time, evening the odds against Germain. With her powers enhanced by the Granseed army's ritual, Ellen nullifies Germain's powers and restores Nemo's life force. As the flow of time returns to normal, Ellen loses consciousness and Shirley takes her to safety; while Nemo, with help from Faria and Reda, seemingly destroys Germain. As the Granseed army returns home, Germain is revealed to have survived his apparent destruction by using the last of his time powers. Suddenly, he is visited by a magical hologram of Sophitia, who is revealed to be the true leader of Physis and has been manipulating him from the very beginning. As Germain finally dies, Sophitia proclaims her own plans to bring about the end of the world, but unknown to her, Reda listens to her in secret. Meanwhile, Sophitia reveals to Gareth that she herself is infected with the same curse that killed Claire and warns Gareth that if he learns more about the old library, he will be infected, as well. Even so, Gareth is determined to find out the truth in order to honor Claire's memory, and so, Sophitia tells him the story of the old library. As the Knights return home from the battle with Physis, Gareth orders his arrest on the grounds of being an artificial Successor created by Physis, even going as far as to blame Gildan's corruption and Claire's death on him.
10	"Conviction -Punishment-"; Transliteration: "Danzai-Panisshumento-" (Japanese: 断罪-パニッシュメント-)	Mitsuyo Yokono	Ukyō Kodachi	June 7, 2021
Nemo is imprisoned in Granseed's dungeon and Faria reveals that his heroic spirit is Jenius, a Knight that once served as the original librarian of Granseed before selling his soul to Physis and burning that library to the ground. Nemo's situation causes a division within the student council, with Gareth deeming Nemo an infiltrator for Physis and Gildan vouching for his innocence. Gareth visits Nemo in order to force the truth out of him and Nemo reveals that he was indeed created by Physisis as an artificial successor, alongside many other homunculi, until the spirit of Jenius inspired him to escape. Nemo refuses to defend himself even when Garith is tempted to kill him, and Faria, who has been listening in to their conversation, decides to find out the truth by herself. Faria asks Yunomia for help and Yunomia reveals that she herself is infected with the same curse that killed Claire and warns Faria that if she tries to discover the truth, her own life will be in danger, as well. Faria doesn't care, however, as she wants to help Nemo, who Faria guides him to the ruins of the old library. Faria finds the chamber containing the book that holds the curse that killed Claire and upon reading it, she discovers the truth. Afterward, Faria travels to the house Nemo was born in and finds a picture of Nemo with his parents, along with a pendant, but she is suddenly attacked by Reda, who had gone into hiding after Germain's defeat. Nemo is taken to Granseed's coliseum for his trial, overseen by Sophitia and the headmaster of Granseed. Nemo still insists he doesn't know anything about Physis or the curse, which Gareth takes as a refusal to testify and suggests his execution. Meanwhile, Gildan and Shirley decide to help Nemo and manage to get an imperial order to stave off Nemo's execution, but Sophitia says that the order has arrived too late and Nemo must be destroyed immediately. Gareth and Joe, who has been seduced by Sophitia, move in to kill Nemo but Faria uses her lightning speed to arrive at the coliseum, claiming that she has learned the truth. She shows Nemo the pendant she found earlier and Nemo admits that he killed the original Nemo, assumed his form, and stole his memories. For that reason, he believes he should be executed, but Faria remains resolute in defending him.
11	"Reprisal -Counterattack-"; Transliteration: "Hangeki-Kauntā Atakku-" (Japanese: 反撃-カウンターアタック-)	Yūshi Ibe	Ukyō Kodachi	June 14, 2021
With Reda's help, Nemo and Faria escape from the coliseum using Faria's airship. Faria and Reda reveal to Nemo that Sophitia is part of Physis and that she knew of Nemo's escape from the Physis base and entrance to Granseed. Since then, Sophitia has been manipulating Nemo into using Jenius' power in order to weaken the seal on the old library. The dark power sealed within the library grows stronger and threatens to spread all over the world, causing an enraged Gareth to ask Sophitia to give him the power to kill Nemo, believing him to be the cause for this disaster, and despite Shirley and Gilda's protests, a reluctant Joe agrees to kill Nemo, as well. Nemo and Faria take refuge in an abandoned house, where Faria reveals that she has been infected by the library's curse but she doesn't regret her decision to learn the truth. She admits that she initially protected Nemo because it was her mission, but now she is protecting him because she wants to do. They ultimately decide to return to Granseed. As Nemo, Faria and Reda return to Granseed, they are attacked by Joe, Gildan and Shirley, who ask for Nemo's surrender, to which Faria refuses on Nemo's behalf. Reda fights Joe, Gildan, and Shirley all by herself so that Nemo and Faria can reach the library and reveals to Joe, Shirley and Gildan that Sophitia is part of Physis. Shirley and Gildan are swayed by her arguments, but Joe, who has a crush on Sophitia, refuses to listen until he loses control of his possession and goes on a rampage. Reda and Shirley move towards the library while Gildan stays behind in order to stop Joe. Once Nemo and Faria reach the bottom of the library, they find the Book of Truth, created by Jenius to act as a seal to the power of destruction in order to prevent its spreading. Jenius and Yunomia reveal that the story of Jenius betraying his fellow Knights and casting a curse on the library was a lie in order to keep others away from the seal, as it was imperfect and would decay with the passage of time. Sophitia reveals herself to be the leader of Physis and that she was there when Physis invaded Granseed many years ago. Jenius killed her, but she endured by transferring her spirit into another body, repeating the process until she could gain access to the library. Sophitia reveals that Nemo can replace the seal on the Book of Time, so she needs to destroy him. As Faria fights Sophitia, Nemo is ambushed and lethally injured by Gareth, who has been corrupted by Sophitia's power. As the seal on the Book of Time breaks, Sophitia seemingly kills Gareth, as well. Suddenly, Ellen uses her time manipulation powers to restore the seal. She had anticipated Sophitia's actions and safeguarded a portion of the sand from the silver hourglass as a contingency plan. As he lays dying, Nemo is visited by the spirit of the original Nemo, the boy he killed back when the current Nemo escaped from Physis. The original Nemo forgives the current Nemo for what happened back then, understanding that his actions were motivated by desperation and survival, not outright malice, and tells the current Nemo to fight for his reason to live: Faria. The original Nemo and Jenius return the current Nemo to the world of the living, where he reaffirms his determination to protect those he cares about and prepares to fight Sophitia.
12	"Finale -Nemo-"; Transliteration: "Shūketsu-Nemo-" (Japanese: 終結-ネモ-)	Yasushi Muroya	Ukyō Kodachi	June 21, 2021
The act of bringing Nemo back to life drains Ellen's lifeforce significantly and leaves her on the brink of death. Fortunately, Shirley makes her drink a portion of her blood, saving her life and turning her into a vampire. Meanwhile, Sophitia absorbs the Book of Time and assimilates the full power of destruction, turning into a large and hideous monster that causes destruction throughout Granseed. At the same time, Gildan defeats Joe and brings him back to his senses. Joe realizes Sophitia has manipulated him and joins Nemo and Faria in defending the academy. Gareth, having recovered from Sophitia's attack thanks to his own power over darkness, helps Nemo and Faria reach Sophitia by piercing a wall made out of pure dark power, seeing it as a form of atonement for his previous betrayal. The Seven Knights and the students of Granseed defend the school against Sophitia and her army. Nemo and Faria confront Sophitia on their own, with Jenius telling Nemo that the Legis Breaker can dispel Sophitia's dark power, with Faria combining her power with Nemo's in order to turn Sophitia back into a humanoid shape, in which she will be vulnerable to the Book of Time's sealing power. The effort is successful, but Nemo and Faria expend their heroic power, leaving them at Sophitia's mercy. As a last resort, Nemo returns to his original homunculus form and weakens Sophitia enough for Nemo and Jenius to combine the last of their powers and recreate the Book of Time, at the cost of Jenius' spirit and turning Nemo into a powerless human. Sometime later, the academy is reconstructed and Reda is accepted as a new student. Gareth also makes a full recovery and rejoins his friends. However, Faria resigns her position as student council president and joins Nemo in a journey to find a way to destroy the Book of Time and prevent its misuse. The episode and the series end with Nemo and Faria reaffirming their desire to protect each other and stay by each other's side.

== Sequels ==
Seven Knights 2 was released on 18 November 2020 in South Korea, and 10 November 2021 internationally.

== Other media ==
Its characters also appeared in SNK's mobile game developed by Netmarble, The King of Fighters All Star.
