= Hiroki Suzuki (actor, born 1985) =

Japanese actor and voice actor

- Born: Hiroki Suzuki; June 4, 1985 (age 40); Sakai, Osaka Prefecture, Japan
- Occupations: Actor; voice actor
- Years active: 2007–present
- Agent: Awesome Inc.
- Known for: Stage play "Touken Ranbu"
- Notable work: Saiyuki Kagekiden; Touken Ranbu
- Height: 173 cm (5 ft 8 in)
- Spouse: Kanako Nishikawa (m. 2022)

Hiroki Suzuki (鈴木 拡樹, Suzuki Hiroki; born June 4, 1985) is a Japanese actor and voice actor represented by Awesome Inc. His debut acting roles were as Reira in the live adaptation of the manga Fuuma no Kojirou and his first main role was in the musical Saiyuki where he played the role of Genjyo Sanzo. He guest starred in Kamen Rider Decade as Kazuma Kendate/Kamen Rider Blade. He is best known for his role as Mikazuki Munechika in the stage plays of Touken Ranbu. At the end of July 2011 he left the modelling agency Junes Corporation and from 2012 he joined Awesome Inc.

== Filmography ==
=== Anime television ===
| Year | Title | Role | Notes |
|---|---|---|---|
| 2019 | Dororo 2019 | Hyakkimaru | |

=== Television ===
| Year | Title | Role | Other notes |
|---|---|---|---|
| 2007 | Fuuma no Kojiro | Reira | |
| 2008 | Here is Greenwood | Kisaragi Shun | |
| 2009 | Kamen Rider Decade | Kendate Kazuma/ Kamen Rider Blade | |
| 2012 | My bakery in love | Tabata Fusanosuke | |
| 2016 | Yowamushi Pedal Live Action | Yasutomo Arakita | |
| 2016 | Snipe special drama | Nishi Kosuke | |
| 2017 | Suits season 6 | Brand (voice) | This was broadcast at first in 2017 in Japan |
| 2019 | Mushikago no Joumae | Kagoroku | |

=== Movies ===
- Kamen Rider x Kamen Rider W & Kamen Rider Decade Movie Great War 2010 (2009) - Kendate Kazuma/ Kamen Rider Blade
- Fun way of writing light novels (2010) - Ishikiri Kiyomaru
- Destiny - enishi (2011) - Jun
- Go! Male High School Theater Department (2011) - Hyoshitsu
- Youth discovery film - always youth edition - Burial shop Mochizuki (2015) - Mochizuki Koji
- Youth discovery film - always youth edition - My human defects (2016)
- Remember me (2018) - Resident of the land of the dead/The man with a corn (voices)
- Touken Ranbu (2019) - Mikazuki Munechika
- Stolen Identity 2 (2020)
- Shinigamizukai no jikenjo (2020) - Kusaka Genshiro

=== Stage Play ===
==== 2008 ====
- Fuuma no Kojiro (2008) - Reira
- Musical "Gakuen Heaven BOY'S LOVE SCRAMBLE!~ Bell Liberty ★ Prince ~" (2008) - Saionji Kaoru
- Saiyuki Kagekiden - Go to the West - (2008) - Genjyo Sanzo
- 30-DELUX The Eighth Live "Familia" (2008) - Kamura
- Afro13 "Death of Samurai" (2008) - Izuna

==== 2009 ====
- Saiyuuki Kagekiden - Dead or alive - (2009) - Genjyo Sanzo
- Ludovic★Vol.4 "Little Alice - The timetable of a boy named Alice" (2009) - Griffon
- Dramatic Review - L`OPÉRA FRAGILE (2009) - Takeshi
- Good morning, uncle (2009) - Hanamura Takashi
- Shonen company "Romeo and Juliet" (2009) - Juliet
- Ludovic★Vol.5 "ROMEO ~Visitors at midnight~" (2009) - Jan
- Gekidan taishu shousestuka "BLUE SKY GRACE" (2009) - Shota
- Nano square ash head (2009) - Kagurazaka Isamu/ Cinderella

==== 2010 ====
- Be with Produce Recitation LOVE × LETTERS (2010) - Kaito/ Misora/ Daichi
- "White Tiger Force" the idol (2010) - Genichiro Hajime
- Ludovic★Vol.6 "HAMLET The kiss of a blue rose" (2010) - Klaus
- Opera Utakata (2010) - Takeshi
- Love, beyond time ~ The destiny of a far away space-time (2010) - Sakuramaru
- abc★ Akasaka Boys Cabaret - First part ~Kokoro goto nuge!~ (2010) - Furugoori Yasuyuki
- Gekidan VitaminX ~Legend of Vitamin~ (2010) - Fuumonji Goro
- Makai tensho (2010) - Date Sajuro
- EVE ~ Bystanders of history ~ 2012 (2010) - Special guest appearance

==== 2011 ====
- Hanasakeru Seishonen 〜The Budding Beauty in The Oriental Blue Wind〜 (2011) - Somand
- Hanaoni - Flower demon (2011) - Takatsuki Reiji
- THE BUTTERFLY EFFECT CHRONICLE "Blood Heaven 〜Seventh Heaven~" (2011) - Macaulay
- abc★ Akasaka Boys Cabaret - Second part ~ Katsu! & Katsu! (2011) - Furugoori Yasuyuki
- Love whispered me to kill (2011) - Tsuruta Seijiro
- Conton club ~ image5 ~ (2011)
- Gokujo Bungaku "In the Forest, Under Cherries in Full Bloom" (2011) - Reader (Princess Tsumiyori)
- My bakery in love (2011) - Tabata Fusanosuke

==== 2012 ====
- Stage play "Yowamushi pedal" (2012) - Yasutomo Arakita
- ASHES AND THE DIAMOND〜Sight of the darkness (2012) - Sapphire
- THE BUTTERFLY EFFECT CHRONICLE "LABYRINTH" (2012) - Macaulay
- abc★ Akasaka Boys Cabaret - Third part - Jibun ni katsu wo irete katsu!~ (2012) - Furugoori Yasuyuki
- Shuwacchi! ~My aim is Prince of Tights~ (2012) - Matsudaira Tsukasa
- SAMURAI banka 2012 ~Boshu Bakumatsu version~ (2012) - Kenta
- The Tale of Genji x Oguro Maki songs ~ I fall in love with twelve (2012) - Koremitsu
- Ludovic★Vol.8 "Little Alice - The timetable of a boy named Alice" (2012) - Dyna
- A Study in Scarlet (2012) - Dr. Watson
- Reading play "Prayer" - A story about goodbye and new encounters in a cold night (2012)
- Reading play "First love" (2012)
- SAMURAI banka II ~ Kishuu's soul (2012) - Shichirobee
- Reading play "Tails' friends" Dog college (2012) - Genshiro (special guest appearance)
- Reading play "Christmas Carol" (2012)

==== 2013 ====
- Stage play "Yowamushi pedal - Hakone Academy Chapter ~ Sleeping Straight Line Demon" (2013) - Yasutomo Arakita
- Musical "Hakuouki" Okita Souji version (2013) - Nagumo Kaoru
- Tokyo eccentric fellow exposition (2013) - Kinoshita
- THE BUTTERFLY EFFECT CHRONICLE "Blood Heaven 〜Seventh Heaven〜" Sad wings (2013) - Macaulay
- Reading play "Ogata's lover - dancer" (2013)
- Music play
- SAMURAI banka III ~Last Samurai code J.~ (2013) - Irie Souzaburou
- Stage play "Yowamushi pedal - Inter High Chapter ~ The First Result" (2013) - Yasutomo Arakita
- 30-DELUX The Remake Theater "Destiny" (2013) - Rose
- Gokujo Bungaku "The Ascension of K, or K's Drowning" (2013) - Reader

==== 2014 ====
- Musical "Hakuouki" HAKU-MYU LIVE (2014) - Nagumo Kaoru
- Life of an amorous man (2014) - Enno Sho
- Saiyuki Kagekiden - God Child (2014) - Genjyo Sanzo
- Stage play "Yowamushi Pedal - Inter High Chapter ~ The Second Order" (2014) - Yasutomo Arakita
- Honky Tonk Blues Sleepless Nights Chapter 2 ~ Resurrection (2014) - Kakeru
- THE BUTTERFLY EFFECT CHRONICLE 〜Blood Heaven Final Tale〜 "Innocent World" (2014) - Macaulay
- Stage play "K" (2014) - Fushimi Saruhiko
- Margarita - The angels of Sengoku era (2014) - Nakaura Julian
- Stage play "Yowamushi pedal - Hakone Academy Chapter ~ The Beast's Awakening" (2014) - Yasutomo Arakita
- Reading play "My social status plan" (2014) - Alfred

==== 2015 ====
- Saiyuki Kagekiden - Burial (2015) - Genjyo Sanzo
- Stage play "Yowamushi Pedal - Inter High Chapter ~ The WINNER" (2015) - Yasutomo Arakita
- The eraser in my head 7th letter (2015) - Kosuke
- Honky Tonk Blues Sleepless Nights Chapter 2 ~Leap (2015) - Kakeru
- Sengoku BASARA vs Devil May Cry (2015) - Dante
- Saiyuki Kagekiden - Reload (2015) - Genjyo Sanzo
- Maboroshi no shiro - Sengoku's beautiful madness (2015) - Ukita Hideie
- Super Danganronpa 2 THE STAGE - Goodbye Despair Academy (2015) - Komaeda Nagito
- Earth's Art Neoline Sacred Creation (2015) - Special guest appearance
- Stage play "Noragami - Kami to negai" (2015) - Yato

==== 2016 ====
- Boku no River-ru (2016) - Vincent van Gogh
- History Tame Live ~ first part (2016)
- Stage play "Touken Ranbu - Burning Honnouji" (2016) - Mikazuki Munechika
- Sin of Sleeping Snow (2016) - Yamagata Masakage
- Sannin kichisa (2016) - Ojoukichisa
- Honky Tonk Blues Sleepless Nights Chapter 2 - Miracle (2016) - Kakeru
- AZUMI - Sengoku version (2016) - Ukiha
- Stage play "Touken Ranbu - Burning Honnouji - Reprise" (2016) - Mikazuki Munechika

==== 2017 ====
- Stage play "Noragami - Kami to Kizuna" (2017) - Yato
- Super Danganronpa 2 THE STAGE 2017 - Komaeda Nagito
- Stage play "Touken Ranbu - Giden - Atatsuki no Dokuganryuu" (2017) - Mikazuki Munechika
- Honky Tonk Blues Sleepless Nights Chapter 3 - Awakening (2017) - Kakeru
- History Tame Live ~ second part (2017)
- Stage play "Rengoku ni Warau" (2017) - Ishida Sakichi
- Stage play "Touken Ranbu - Joden Mitsuraboshi Katana gatari" (2017) - Mikazuki Munechika (cameo)
- Seven Souls in the Skull Castle - Season Moon (2017-2018) - Tenmao

==== 2018 ====
- Reading stage "The eraser in my head" (2018) - Kosuke
- Stage play "Touken Ranbu - Hiden yui no me no hototogisu" (2018) - Mikazuki Munechika
- Recitated stage "Tomorrow I will date with yesterday's you" (2018) - Takatoshi Minamiyama
- "No. 9 - Immortal Melody" (2018) - Nikolaus Johann Beethoven

==== 2019 ====
- Stage play "Dororo" (2019) - Hyakkimaru
- Stage play "Psycho-Pass" (2019) - Kusen Haruto
- Saiyuki Kagekiden - Darkness (2019) - Genjyo Sanzo
- Stage play Yu Yu Hakusho (2019) - Kurama

==== 2020 ====
- Musical Little Shop of Horrors (2020) - Seymour Krelborn
- Stage play "The Great War of Archimedes" (2020) - Tadashi Kai (cancelled due Covid-19)
- Stage play Tokiko-san no Toki (2020) - Shoma/Toki
- Stage play Yu Yu Hakusho - Sono ni (2020) - Kurama

==== 2021 ====
- Stage play "Touken Ranbu - Osaka Summer Campaign" (2021) - Mikazuki Munechika
- Bakuman THE STAGE (2021) - Mashiro Moritaka

=== TV programs ===
| Year | Title | Role | Other notes |
|---|---|---|---|
| 2010-12 | Sengoku Nabe TV | Nobunaga and Ranmaru - Mori Ranmaru / AKR47 featuring Kira - Kira Kouzukenosuke | |
| 2014-15 | Ore no chizuchō | Tokugawa Mitsukuni (Mito Mitsukuni) | Season 1-2 |
| 2017-20 | 2.5 Dimensional Danshi Oshi TV | MC | Season1-4 |
| 2018 | Marie's knowledge! Japan | Gabriel | |

=== Web drama ===
| Year | Title | Role | Other notes |
|---|---|---|---|
| 2019 | Kafka's Tokyo despair diary | Kafka | |

== Other works ==
=== CD ===
- Original TV soundtrack "Fuuma no Kojiro" Music Collection (2007) - "Vermilion Flames" by Reira
- Koko wa Greenwood - HERE IS GREENWOOD - Vocal Mini Album (2008) - "Kiseki moment" by Kisaragi Shun
- Sengoku Nabe TV Music Tonight - Somehow I can learn history CD (2011) - "Atsumori 2011" by Nobunaga and Ranmaru
- Sengoku Nabe TV Music Tonight - Somehow I can learn history CD second deporture (2013) - "Uchitainda" "Genroku Akoujiken" by AKR47 featuring Kira

=== Soft image ===
- Watching only For Lady (2009)
- Real Face Suzuki Hiroki (2014)

=== Photo album ===
- Suzuki Hiroki's first album "SHAFT - Suzuki Hiroki Acting From Thirty" - (2016)
