= Toshiyuki Someya =

Japanese actor and voice actor

- 染谷 俊之
- Born: December 17, 1987 (age 38); Kanagawa Prefecture, Japan
- Other name: Chiharu Oikawa (及川 千晴)
- Occupations: Actor; voice actor; model
- Years active: 2008–present
- Agent: GFA Production
- Height: 175 cm (5 ft 9 in)
- Website: Toshiyuki Someya Official Site

Toshiyuki Someya (染谷 俊之, Someya Toshiyuki; born December 17, 1987) is a Japanese actor, voice actor and model. He debuted as an actor in 2008 and has starred in multiple theater and film projects including Musical: The Prince of Tennis 2nd Season, Stage: Touken Ranbu, Kokuchō no Himitsu, and Koisuru Futari.

Someya debuted as a voice actor in 2016 through the Rainy Cocoa series, where he was initially credited as Chiharu Oikawa (及川 千晴, Oikawa Chiharu). Since then, he has notably been involved in Marginal #4, Hugtto! PreCure, School Babysitters, Renai Bakumatsu Kareshi, and Dimension High School.

== Career ==
Someya debuted as an actor in 2008.

== Filmography ==
=== Film ===
Year	Title	Role	Notes	Ref.
2011	Nana to Kaoru Part 1	Hiroshi Yagami		
2012	Nana to Kaoru Part 2	Hiroshi Yagami		
2015	Kani o Taberu	Osamu Tamiya	Lead role	
2015	Hitsuji o Kazoeru	Osamu Tamiya	Lead role	
2016	Hakuoki: Sweet School Life The Movie	Hajime Saitō	Lead role	
2016	Tenbin o Yurasu	Osamu Tamiya	Lead role	
2017	Nigeta Sakana wa Oyoideru	Osamu Tamiya	Lead role	
2018	Kokuchō no Himitsu	Ryōhei Toyama	Lead role	
2019	Koisuru Futari	Shunsuke Katagiri	Lead role	
2021	Napoleon and Me	Shingo Iwata		
2023	Another Day in Paradise	Masahide Hiyoshi	Lead role	
2025	Shinpei	Shōjirō Sawada		

=== Theatre ===
Year	Title	Role	Notes
2011–2014	Musical: The Prince of Tennis 2nd Season	Rin Hirakoba	
2015	Fushigi Yûgi	Nuriko	
2015	Hakuoki: Sweet School Life	Hajime Saitō	
2016	Cardfight!! Vanguard	Ren Suzugamori	
2016	Stage: Touken Ranbu	Tsurumaru Kuninaga	
2022	Mankai Stage "A3!" ~Spring 2022~	Chikage Utsuki	

=== Television ===
Year	Title	Role	Network	Notes
2016	Rainy Cocoa in Hawaii	Calloway Okamura	Tokyo MX	Voice in anime; supporting role; credited as Chiharu Oikawa
2017	Marginal #4: Kiss Kara Tsukuru Bang Bang!	Teruma Nakama		Voice in anime; supporting role
2017	Ame-con!!	Chipper Okamura	Tokyo MX	Voice in anime; supporting role
2018	School Babysitters	Tomoya Yagi	Tokyo MX	Voice in anime; supporting role
2018	Hugtto! PreCure	Anri Wakamiya	TV Asahi	Voice in anime; supporting role
2018	Galaxy Express 999	Count Mecha	BS-SKP!	Supporting role
2018	Renai Bakumatsu Kareshi	Hijikata Toshizō	TBS	Voice in anime; lead role
2019	Dimension High School	Soshi Momoya	Tokyo MX, BS Fuji	Voice in anime; supporting role
2019	Real Fake	Hidetoshi Moriya	MBS TV	Lead role
2021	My Beautiful Man	Iruma	MBS TV	

=== Dubbing ===
- Here and Now, Ramon Bayer-Boatwright (Daniel Zovatto)
- Star Trek: Picard, Elnor (Evan Evagora)
