= Kenichi Suemitsu =

Japanese playwright, stage director, actor

- 末満 健一
- Born: June 18, 1976 (age 49); Osaka Prefecture, Japan
- Occupations: Scriptwriter; Stage director
- Agent: Watanabe Entertainment
- Notable work: Touken Ranbu; TRUMP series
- Height: 178 cm (5 ft 10 in)

Kenichi Suemitsu (Japanese: 末満 健一, Hepburn: Suemitsu Kenichi; born June 18, 1976) is a Japanese playwright, scriptwriter, stage director and actor represented by Watanabe Entertainment. His most notable works are the Stage: Touken Ranbu and TRUMP series stage plays.

== Biography ==
Suemitsu was born in Osaka Prefecture on June 18, 1976. He initially worked as an actor in small theatres in the Kansai region. In 2002, Suemitsu formed the theatre group Peacepit, where he presented works that he wrote and directed.

== Works ==
=== Stage productions ===
TRUMP series

- PEACEPIT VOL.10 "TRUMP" (2009)
- PEACEPIT VOL.16 "TRINITY THE TRUMP" (2012)
- Dstage12th "TRUMP" (2013)
- Theatrical Women's Club Musical "LILIUM" (2014)
- Patch stage vol.6 "SPECTER" (2015)
- Theatrical Women's Club Musical "LILIUM" - Thanksgiving, short story "Two-flower bloom" (2015)
- NAPPOS UNITED stage play "TRUMP" (2015)
- PEACEPIT stage play "Grand Guignol" (2017)
- Musical "Marigold" (2018)
- COCOON Tsugi no Kageri (2019)
- COCOON Hoshi Hitotsu (2019)

Theater Company Patch

- Patch stage vol.1 "OLIVER BOYS" (2012)
- Patch stage vol.2 "Cave Boy" (2013)
- Patch stage vol.3 "Thief quintet" (2013)
- Patch stage vol.4 "Destruction runner" (2014)
- Patch stage vol.6 "SPECTER" (2015)
- Patch stage vol.7 "Yuuhiden" (2015)
- Patch stage EX "Four Contacts - Thank you! Thanks !! Theatrical Company Patch 4th Grade Announcement Festival !!" (2016)
- Patch stage vol.8 "Ukiyo drama - Isobe Iso Hyōe's story - Ukiyo is tough" (2016)
- Patch stage vol.9 "Ukiyo drama - Isobe Iso Hyōe's story - Ukiyo is tough - Sunny version" (2016)
- Patch stage vol.10 "Hanyū hasutarō" (2017)
- Patch × TRUMP series 10th ANNIVERSARY "SPECTER" (2019)

Hello! Project

- Theatrical Women's Club Musical "LILIUM" (2014)
- Theatrical Women's Club Musical "LILIUM" - Thanksgiving, short story "Two-flower bloom" (2015)

Stage play "K"

- Stage play "K" (2014)
- Stage play "K - Second Chapter" (2015)
- Stage play "K - Lost Small World" (2016)
- Stage play "K - MISSING KINGS" (2017)
- Stage play "K - RETURN OF KINGS" (2019)

Stage Play Touken Ranbu

- Stage play "Touken Ranbu - Kyoden: Moyuru Honnoji - Shoen" (2016)
- Stage play "Touken Ranbu - Kyoden: Moyuru Honnoji - Saien" (2016)
- Stage play "Touken Ranbu - Giden: Akatsuki no Dokuganryu" (2017)
- Stage play "Touken Ranbu - Gaiden: Kono Yora no Odawara" (2017)
- Stage play "Touken Ranbu - Joden: Mitsuraboshi Katana Gatari" (2017)
- Stage play "Touken Ranbu - Hiden: Yui no Me no Hototogisu" (2018)
- Stage play "Touken Ranbu - Jiden: Hibi no Ha Yo Chiruran" (2019)
- Stage play "Touken Ranbu - Iden: Oboro no Shishitachi" (2019))
- Stage play "Touken Ranbu - New stage" (2020)

Others

- Stage play "Demon Slayer: Kimetsu no Yaiba" (2020)
- Isabeau - Musical about Isabeau of Bavaria (2024, direction, script)
- Equal (2021, based on the stage play)

=== Anime ===
- Delico's Nursery (2024, screenplay)
- Touken Ranbu Kai: Kyoden Moyuru Honnōji (2024, screenplay)
