= Renai Bakumatsu Kareshi =

Anime and video game series

- Logo of the series

恋愛幕末カレシ〜時の彼方で花咲く恋〜 (Renai Bakumatsu Kareshi: Toki no Kanata de Hanasaku Koi)
- Video game
- Developer: FuRyu
- Publisher: FuRyu
- Platform: Android, iOS
- Released: JP: March 14, 2017
- Anime television series

Bakumatsu
- Directed by: Masaki Watanabe
- Produced by: Satoru Shimosato; Kaoru Wada; Ai Okamoto; Mayu Maeda
- Written by: Masahiro Yokotani
- Music by: Ryō Kawasaki
- Studio: Studio Deen
- Original network: TBS, BS-TBS
- Original run: October 5, 2018 – December 21, 2018
- Episodes: 12
- Anime television series

Bakumatsu: Crisis
- Directed by: Mitsutoshi Satō
- Produced by: Satoru Shimosato; Kaoru Wada; Ai Okamoto; Mayu Maeda
- Written by: Masahiro Yokotani
- Music by: Ryō Kawasaki; Go Sakabe
- Studio: Studio Deen
- Original network: TBS, BS-TBS
- Original run: April 4, 2019 – June 20, 2019
- Episodes: 12

Renai Bakumatsu Kareshi (恋愛幕末カレシ〜時の彼方で花咲く恋〜, Renai Bakumatsu Kareshi: Toki no Kanata de Hanasaku Koi) is a Japanese otome game published by FuRyu. It was released in Japan on March 14, 2017, for Android and iOS devices. An anime television series adaptation by Studio Deen titled Bakumatsu premiered from October 5 to December 21, 2018. A second season titled Bakumatsu Crisis premiered from April 4 to June 20, 2019.

== Characters ==
Takasugi Shinsaku (高杉 晋作)
Voiced by: Yuichi Nakamura
Katsura Kogorō (桂 小五郎)
Voiced by: Takuya Eguchi
Sakamoto Ryōma (坂本 龍馬)
Voiced by: Shin-ichiro Miki
Okada Izō (岡田 以蔵)
Voiced by: Yoshitsugu Matsuoka
Hijikata Toshizō (土方 歳三)
Voiced by: Toshiyuki Someya
Kondō Isami (近藤 勇)
Voiced by: Takuya Satō
Okita Sōji (沖田 総司)
Voiced by: Tsubasa Yonaga
Saitō Hajime (斎藤 一)
Voiced by: Keita Tada
Tokugawa Yoshinobu (徳川 慶喜)
Voiced by: Tatsuhisa Suzuki
Yamazaki Susumu (山崎 烝)
Voiced by: Taku Yashiro
The Emperor (帝, Mikado)
Voiced by: Shunsuke Takeuchi
Seimei (晴明)
Voiced by: Yoshiki Nakajima
Mori Ranmaru (森 蘭丸)
Voiced by: Yumiri Hanamori

== Media ==
=== Anime ===
An anime television series adaptation by Studio Deen titled Bakumatsu aired from October 5 to December 21, 2018. In contrast to the game which is a romance, the anime is a science fiction action-adventure series. The series ran for 12 episodes. The opening theme is "Spiral Maze" by MIKOTO, while the ending theme is "A Journey Far Away" (遥かなる旅, Harukanaru Tabi) by Eri Sasaki.

A second season has been announced. The second season, titled Bakumatsu Crisis, premiered from April 4 to June 20, 2019. Mitsutoshi Satō is replacing Masaki Watanabe as director, and Ryo Kawasaki and Go Sakabe are replacing MAGES as music composers. The rest of the staff members and cast are reprising their roles. The opening theme for the second season is "Brave Rejection" by Hi!Superb, while the ending theme is "Homura" by Zwei. The anime is licensed in North America by Crunchyroll, and is streaming as it airs.

==== Season 1 (2018) ====
No.	Title (Note: All English titles are taken from Crunchyroll.)	Original release date
1	"Outbreak of the Susanoo Incident: The Other Bakumatsu!"; Transliteration: "Susanō jihen boppatsu Mō hitotsu no bakumatsu!" (Japanese: スサノオ事変勃発 もうひとつのバクマツ！)	October 5, 2018
2	"Kill, Takasugi, for Love!"; Transliteration: "Kire, Takasugi Ai no tame ni!" (Japanese: 斬れ、高杉 アイのために！)	October 12, 2018
3	"Ryoma's Assassination? Assassin from the Past!"; Transliteration: "Ryūuma ansatsu? Kako kara no shikaku" (Japanese: 龍馬アンサツ？ 過去からの刺客)	October 19, 2018
4	"Confidential Infiltration: The Code of the Shinsengumi!"; Transliteration: "Gokuhi sennyū Shinsengumi no okite!" (Japanese: 極秘潜入 新撰組のオキテ！)	October 26, 2018
5	"Okita's Fury: Time Wanderer!"; Transliteration: "Okita kyōran Toki no nagarejin!" (Japanese: 沖田狂乱 トキの流れ人！)	November 2, 2018
6	"The Thousandth Prize: Yoshinobu, My Master!"; Transliteration: "Senbonme no emono Yoshinobu, waga omo!" (Japanese: 千本目のエモノ 慶喜、我が主！)	November 9, 2018
7	"Runaway Express! Don't Die, Katsura!"; Transliteration: "Bōsō tokkyū Shinuna, Katsura!" (Japanese: 暴走トッキュウ 死ぬな、桂！)	November 16, 2018
8	"The Kinkaji Incident! Izo Dies?"; Transliteration: "Kinkakuji no hen! Izō, shisu?" (Japanese: キンカクジの変！ 以蔵、死す？)	November 23, 2018
9	"Clash! The Last Samurai!"; Transliteration: "Gekitotsu, saigo no samurai!" (Japanese: 激突、最後のサムライ！)	November 30, 2018
10	"Rescue Seimei! Escape from Prison Gate Island!"; Transliteration: "Seimei dakkan! Gokumontō kara no datsugoku" (Japanese: 晴明ダッカン！獄門島からの脱獄)	December 7, 2018
11	"Beloved Old School, Takasugi's Tears!"; Transliteration: "Natsukashiki manabiya Takasugi no namida!" (Japanese: 懐かしき学び舎 高杉のナミダ！)	December 14, 2018
12	"Decisive Battle! Giant Castle Susanoo!"; Transliteration: "Kessen, kyoshiro Susanō!" (Japanese: 決戦、巨城スサノオ！)	December 21, 2018

==== Season 2 (2019) ====
No. overall	No. in season	Title	Original release date
13	1	"Black Ship Invasion and Mugensai's Return!"; Transliteration: "Kurofune shūrai Mugensai no Kikan!" (Japanese: クロフネ襲来 無限斎の帰還！)	April 4, 2019
14	2	"Kyoto on Fire! The Mysterious Ghost Light"; Transliteration: "Kyōto enjō! Onibi no Nazo" (Japanese: 京都炎上！ 鬼火のナゾ)	April 11, 2019
15	3	"Bakumatsu Supernatural Tales: Tiger Sighting!"; Transliteration: "Bakumatsu kaītan Tora o mita!" (Japanese: 幕末怪異譚 トラを見た！)	April 18, 2019
16	4	"Reunion with Hijikata: Ikedaya Incident!"; Transliteration: "Saikai no Hijikata Ikedaya jihen!" (Japanese: 再会の土方 イケダヤ事変！)	April 25, 2019
17	5	"Who Goes There? Night Sky Konpeito"; Transliteration: "Kita no Wa dareda? Yozora no Konpeitō" (Japanese: 来たのは誰だ？ 夜空のコンペイトウ)	May 2, 2019
18	6	"Chronometer Out of Control! Kyoto's Motionless Day"; Transliteration: "Toki tatsugi bōsō! Kyōto no Seishi suru hi" (Japanese: 時辰儀暴走！ 京都のセイシする日)	May 9, 2019
19	7	"Birth of the Chronometer! Destined Siblings"; Transliteration: "Toki tatsugi tanjō! Unmei no Kyōdai" (Japanese: 時辰儀誕生！ 運命のキョウダイ)	May 16, 2019
20	8	"Yoshinobu's Thoughts and Kondo's Feelings"; Transliteration: "Yoshinobu no Omoi Kondō no Omoi" (Japanese: 慶喜のオモイ 近藤のオモイ)	May 23, 2019
21	9	"Hidden Feelings! A Masked Confession!"; Transliteration: "Himetaru omoi! Kamen no Kokuhaku" (Japanese: 秘めたる想い！ 仮面のコクハク)	May 30, 2019
22	10	"Vanished! Giant Castle Susanoo!"; Transliteration: "Shōmetsu! Kyōshiro Susanō!" (Japanese: 消滅！ 巨城スサノオ！)	June 6, 2019
23	11	"Birth! The Great God Susanoo!"; Transliteration: "Tanjō! Kyōkami Susanō!" (Japanese: 誕生！ 巨神スサノオ！)	June 13, 2019
24	12	"To a New Bakumatsu!"; Transliteration: "Atarashiki BAKUMATSU e!" (Japanese: 新しきBAKUMATSU へ！)	June 20, 2019
