= B2takes! =

Japanese boy band

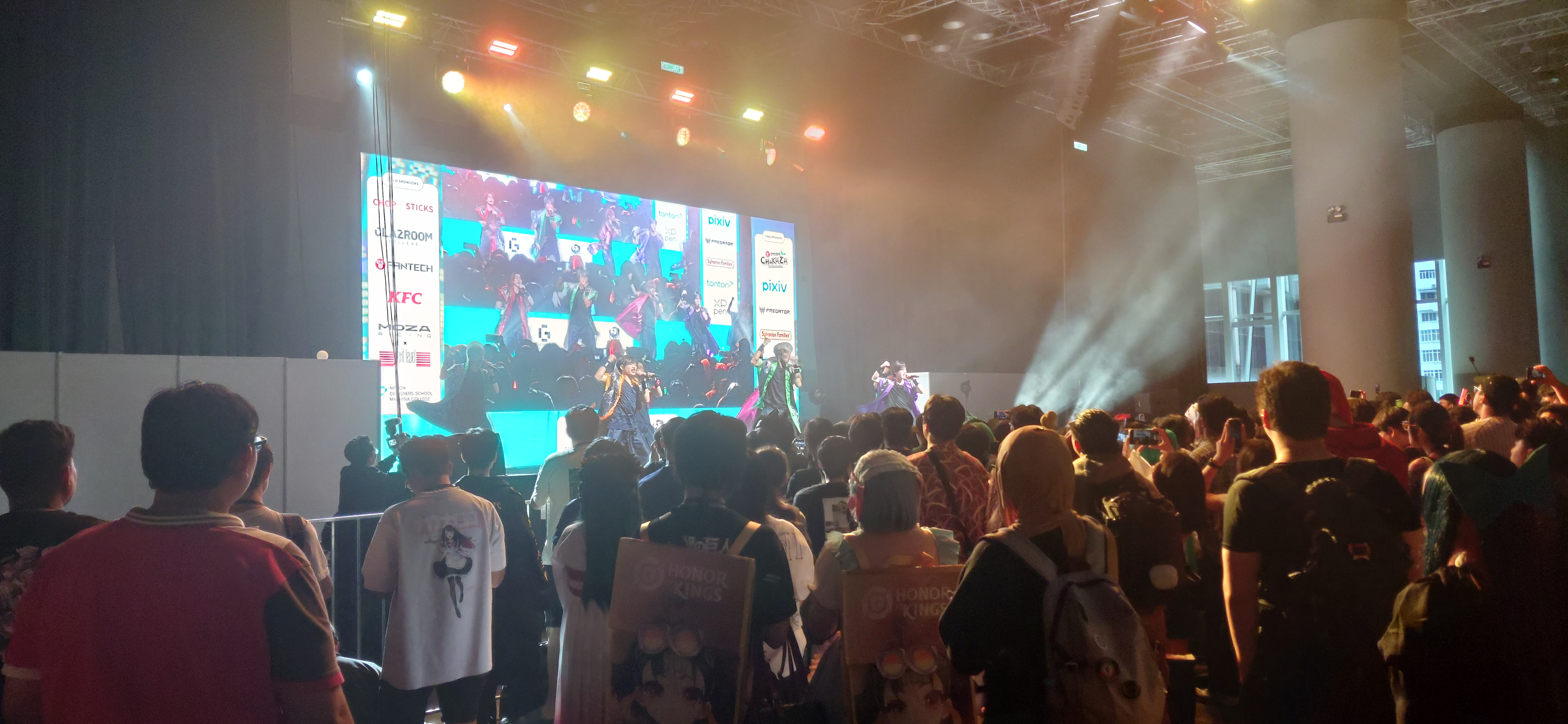
- B2takes!! performing at Comic Fiesta 2025

Background information
- Origin: Japan
- Genres: J-pop
- Years active: 2012-present
- Label: King Records
- Members: Atsushi; Yuta Iiyama; Igu; Peewee Okuyama; Shidax; Wataru; Ryosuke Chiba; Takuto Nakajima; Hayato Mori; Manaya Yajima; Kazuya Yuuki
- Past members: Ren Ozawa; YouJin
- Website: b2takes.com

B2takes! (also stylized as B2takes!!) is a Japanese boy band formed in 2012 by Bacs Entertainment.

== History ==
B2takes! was formed in December 2012 by Bacs Entertainment. In August 2015, the group released "Hanabi" as their debut single. In 2018, B2takes! made their major label debut through King Records with the double A-side single "Brand New Anniversary" / "Not Alone." "Not Alone" was used as the theme song to the film BD: Akechi Tantei Jimusho, which Ozawa starred in. Ozawa and Wataru departed from the group during their 6th anniversary concert in November 2018; however, Wataru later rejoined. In June 2019, Ryosuke Chiba, Manaya Yajima, Kazuya Yuuki, and YouJin were added as new members to the group. In July 2020, B2takes!'s official website announced that YouJin would be leaving the group and terminating his contract with their agency at the end of August 2020.

== Members ==
=== Current ===
- Atsushi (あつし)
- Yuta Iiyama (飯山 裕太)
- Igu
- Peewee Okuyama (奥山 ピーウィー)
- Shidax (しだっくす)
- Takuto Nakajima (中島 拓斗)
- Hayato Mori (森 勇翔)
- Wataru (わたる)
- Ryosuke Chiba (千葉 良祐) (2019-present)
- Manaya Yajima (矢島 愛弥) (2019-present)
- Kazuya Yuuki (結城 伽寿也) (2019-present)

=== Former ===
- Ren Ozawa (2013-2018)
- YouJin (2019-2020)

== Discography ==
=== Singles ===
List of singles, with selected chart positions, sales figures and certifications
Title	Year	Peak chart positions		Sales	Album
Title	Year	JPN	JPN Hot	Sales	Album
"Hanabi"	2015	—	—	—	Non-album single
"Akubi"	2016	15	—	—	Non-album single
"Moyamoya Lover" (モヤモヤLOVER)	2016	16	24	JPN: 12,300 (physical); JPN: 2,536 (downloads & streaming)	Non-album single
"Suki tte Iou" (好きって言おう)	2017	8	12	JPN: 15,502 (physical); JPN: 2,841 (downloads & streaming)	Non-album single
"Shanana Koko ni Oide" (Shanana ここにおいで)	2018	3	4	JPN: 39,897 (physical); JPN: 4,968 (downloads & streaming)	Non-album single
"Brand New Anniversary" (ブラン・ニュー・アニバーサリー)	2018	2	5	JPN: 44,102 (Note: "Brand New Anniversary" and "Not Alone" were released physically as a double A-side single. The sales count and Oricon ranking reflects both songs combined.)	Non-album single
"Not Alone"	2018	2	—	JPN: 44,102	Non-album single
"Growing"	2019	5	16	JPN: 29,766 (physical); JPN: 2,395 (downloads & streaming)	Non-album single
"Akashi" (証-Akashi-)	2019	3	13	JPN: 31,864 (physical); JPN: 3,363 (downloads & streaming)	Non-album single
"—" denotes releases that did not chart or were not released in that region.
