= Domerica =

Japanese animation studio

Domerica Inc.
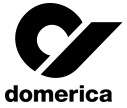
- Native name: 株式会社ドメリカ
- Romanized name: Kabushiki-gaisha Domerika
- Company type: Private KK
- Industry: Japanese animation
- Founded: October 2012; 13 years ago
- Founder: Kazuya Ichikawa
- Headquarters: Ōhashi, Meguro, Tokyo, Japan
- Key people: Kazuya Ichikawa (president and CEO)
- Website: domerica.net

Domerica Inc. (株式会社ドメリカ, Kabushiki-gaisha Domerika) is a Japanese animation studio founded on October 2012 by freelance CGI animator Kazuya Ichikawa.

== Works ==
=== Television series ===
Title	Director(s)	First run start date	First run end date	Eps	Note(s)	Ref(s)
Seven Knights Revolution: Hero Successor	Kazuya Ichikawa	April 5, 2021	June 21, 2021	12	Based on the video game Seven Knights by Netmarble. Co-produced with Liden Films.	
The World Ends with You: The Animation	Kazuya Ichikawa	April 10, 2021	June 26, 2021	12	Based on the video game The World Ends With You by Square Enix. Co-produced with Shin-Ei Animation.	
Touken Ranbu Kai: Kyoden Moyuru Honnōji	Kazuya Ichikawa	April 2, 2024	May 21, 2024	9	Based on the video game Touken Ranbu by DMM Games.	
Fermat Kitchen	Kazuya Ichikawa	July 5, 2025	September 27, 2025	12	Based on the manga series of the same name by Yūgo Kobayashi	
Gnosia	Kazuya Ichikawa	October 12, 2025	March 15, 2026	21	Based on the video game of the same name by Petit Depoto	

=== Films ===
Title	Director(s)	Release	Note(s)	Ref(s)
Touken Ranbu Kai: Dо̄den Chikashi Haberau Monora	Kazuya Ichikawa	August 16, 2024	Prequel to Touken Ranbu Kai: Kyoden Moyuru Honnōji.	

=== Original net animation ===
Title	Director(s)	First run start date	First run end date	Eps	Note(s)	Ref(s)
Mentori	Kazuya Ichikawa	December 14, 2017	February 15, 2018	10	Based on a character created by Increws	
Dekiru kana	Kazuya Ichikawa	June 5, 2017	August 30, 2017	10	Based on the manga of the same name by Rieko Saibara	
Romantic Killer	Kazuya Ichikawa	October 27, 2022		12	Based on the manga of the same name by Wataru Momose.	
