= Real Fake =

- Written by: Nobuhiro Mouri; Yō Hosaka (season 2)
- Directed by: Nobuhiro Mouri; Tōru Yamashita (season 2)
- Starring: Yoshihiko Aramaki; Keisuke Ueda; Ren Ozawa (season 1); Masanari Wada; Ryuji Sato; Ryunosuke Matsumura; Toshiyuki Someya; Shouta Aoi; Hiroki Ino (season 2); Hiroki Sasamori (season 2)
- Opening theme: "Real Fake" by Stellar Crowns with Akane (season 1); "Rumor" by Stellar Crowns with Akane (season 2)
- Ending theme: "Fake of Fake" by Shouta Aoi (season 1); "Glass no Kutsu" by Shouta Aoi (season 2)
- Country of origin: Japan
- No. of seasons: 3
- No. of episodes: 12

Production
- Running time: 30 minutes
- Production companies: Dub, Inc.

Original release
- Network: MBS, TBS
- Release: September 2 – September 23, 2019

Real Fake (stylized as REAL⇔FAKE) is a Japanese television mini-series that aired on MBS on the channel's programming block, Dramaism. The series was written and directed by Nobuhiro Mouri, with production by Dub, Inc. The production stars Yoshihiko Aramaki, Keisuke Ueda, Ren Ozawa, Masanari Wada, Ryuji Sato, Ryunosuke Matsumura, Toshiyuki Someya, and Shouta Aoi, all of whom have been involved in 2.5D musicals. A second season titled Real Fake 2nd Stage was released on June 15, 2021.

== Plot ==
Stellar Crowns is a project group made up of actors and singers, but one of the members, Akane, disappears before their debut. However, Stellar Crowns' agency gets a tip stating that he is still alive but has been kidnapped by a traitorous member in Stellar Crowns. The president of Queen Record, Sasakida, enlists Hidetoshi Moriya, an aspiring filmmaker and Akane's former classmate, to investigate under a pretense of filming a documentary about Stellar Crowns. Eventually, Moriya learns that Akane's brother, a songwriter, had committed suicide after being targeted by Sasakida, and in order to protect Akane, Stellar Crowns had staged his disappearance. After the truth is discovered, Sasakida is removed from his position from the agency while Akane is made its president.

== Characters ==
Nagisa Makino (牧野 凪沙, Makino Nagisa)
Played by: Yoshihiko Aramaki
Nagisa is a member of Stella Crowns. He is a former idol singer struggling to break into acting.
Yusuke Ikuta (育田 悠輔, Ikuta Yūsuke)
Played by: Keisuke Ueda
Yusuke is a member of Stella Crowns. He is an actor and was a former classmate of Kakeru's.
Rin Sawase (沢瀬 凛, Sawase Rin)
Played by: Ren Ozawa
Rin is a member of Stellar Crowns. He is an actor and has mostly appeared on variety shows. He and Reijiro were childhood friends.
Kakeru Suzuki (鈴木 翔琉, Suzuki Kakeru)
Played by: Ryuji Sato
Kakeru is a member of Stellar Crowns. He is a singer from Akane's agency and was recruited as his replacement.
Reijiro Umehara (梅原 黎士郎, Umehara Reijirō)
Played by: Ryunosuke Matsumura
Reijiro is a member of Stellar Crowns. He studied and worked abroad as a radio personality in Australia. He is the final person who joined the group.
Masayuki Sena (瀬名 征行, Sena Masayuki)
Played by: Masanari Wada
Masayuki is a member of Stella Crowns. He is a friend of Nagisa and fan of Akane.
Hidetoshi Moriya (守屋 英俊, Moriya Hidetoshi)
Played by: Toshiyuki Someya
Moriya is an aspiring filmmaker and Akane's classmate from high school.
Akane Kaburagi (鏑木 朱音, Kaburagi Akane)
Played by: Shouta Aoi
Akane is popular singer known for his angelic singing voice. He was originally a member of Stella Crowns, but disappears before their debut.

== Production ==
Real Fake began airing on MBS as part of their programming block, Dramaism, on September 2, 2019, (Note: MBS lists the air date as September 1, 2019 at 24:50, which is September 2, 2019 at 12:50 AM.) and later aired on TBS on September 4, 2019. The series is written and directed by Nobuhiro Mouri and produced by Dub, Inc. The cast features actors who have previously acted in 2.5D musicals. The opening theme song is "Real Fake" by the main cast as their characters, credited as Stellar Crowns with Akane. The ending theme song is "Fake of Fake" by Shouta Aoi, which was released as a B-side on his single "Harmony."

A second season titled Real Fake 2nd Stage was announced in December 2020 and scheduled for broadcast in 2021, with the original cast reprising their roles. Ren Ozawa was removed from the cast following his domestic abuse allegations. On April 9, 2021, Hiroki Ino and Hiroki Sasamori were added as regular cast members and 2nd Stage was announced to be broadcast beginning June 15, 2021. The opening theme is "Rumor" by Stellar Crowns with Akane and the ending theme is "Glass no Kutsu" by Shouta Aoi. 2nd Stage is directed by Tōru Yamashita, with Yō Kosaka in charge of script.

== Episodes ==
=== Season 1 (2019) ===
| No. overall | No. in season | Title | Directed by | Written by | Original release date |
|---|---|---|---|---|---|
| 1 | 1 | "Episode 1"; Transliteration: "Dai-ichi-wa" (Japanese: 第1話) | Nobuhiro Mouri | Nobuhiro Mouri | September 2, 2019 |
| 2 | 2 | "Episode 2"; Transliteration: "Dai-ni-wa" (Japanese: 第2話) | Nobuhiro Mouri | Nobuhiro Mouri | September 9, 2019 |
| 3 | 3 | "Episode 3"; Transliteration: "Dai-san-wa" (Japanese: 第3話) | Nobuhiro Mouri | Nobuhiro Mouri | September 16, 2019 |
| 4 | 4 | "Episode 4"; Transliteration: "Dai-yon-wa" (Japanese: 第4話) | Nobuhiro Mouri | Nobuhiro Mouri | September 23, 2019 |

== Soundtrack ==
Cheers, Big Ears!

Soundtrack album by Stellar Crowns with Akane
- Released: November 27, 2019
- Genre: J-pop
- Label: King Records

Cheers, Big Ears! is a studio album produced for Real Fake featuring songs performed by the main cast as their characters. The limited version of the album included an exclusive DVD and an alternate cover. The album charted at #18 on the Oricon Weekly Album Charts and sold 7,319 copies on its first week.

| No. | Title | Length |
|---|---|---|
| 1. | "Real Fake" (performed by Stellar Crowns with Akane (Yoshihiko Aramaki, Keisuke Ueda, Ren Ozawa, Ryuji Sato, Ryunosuke Matsumura, Masanari Wada, and Shouta Aoi)) | 3:48 |
| 2. | "P-F-Up!!" (performed by Nagisa Makino (Yoshihiko Aramaki)) | 4:23 |
| 3. | "From Now on" (performed by Yusuke Ikuta (Keisuke Ueda)) | 3:43 |
| 4. | "Paradox" (performed by Rin Sawase (Ren Ozawa)) | 3:57 |
| 5. | "Toxic Liar" (performed by Kakeru Suzuki (Ryuji Sato)) | 3:46 |
| 6. | "Why Why Why" (performed Reijiro Umehara (Ryunosuke Matsumura)) | 4:28 |
| 7. | "Someday" (performed Masayuki Sena (Masanari Wada)) | 4:47 |
| 8. | "Tenshi no Kokoro" (天使の心 lit. An Angel's Heart; performed by Akane (Shouta Aoi)) | 4:29 |
| 9. | "Moshi mo no Negai" (もしもの願い; lit. A Hypothetical Wish; performed by Nagisa Makino (Yoshihiko Aramaki) & Yusuke Ikuta (Keisuke Ueda)) | 3:48 |
| 10. | "Real Fake" (remix; performed by Stellar Crowns with Akane (Yoshihiko Aramaki, Keisuke Ueda, Ren Ozawa, Ryuji Sato, Ryunosuke Matsumura, Masanari Wada, and Shouta Aoi)) | 4:01 |
| 11. | "Fake of Fake" (TV size; performed by Shouta Aoi) | 1:40 |
| Total length: | | 42:50 |
