= Stage: Touken Ranbu =

Stage plays

Touken Ranbu the Stage (舞台 刀剣乱舞, Butai Touken Ranbu) is a series of 2.5D stage plays co-produced by Marvelous Entertainment, Nitroplus, DMM.com and Toho based on the online browser game Touken Ranbu. The plays were screenplay and directed by Kenichi Suemitsu. The plays were first announced in 2015 at the same time as Musical: Touken Ranbu and features a different cast and production crew.

== Production history ==
The first stage play, Kyoden: Moyuru Honnoji (舞台『刀剣乱舞』虚伝 燃ゆる本能寺), ran from May 3, 2016 to May 20, 2016. The play was also live-streamed in 60 theaters in Taiwan and Hong Kong on May 20, 2016, with over 40,000 people in attendance. The success of the play led to a separate re-run of Kyoden: Moyuru Honnoji, revived under the name Kyoden: Moyuru Honnoji: Saien (舞台『刀剣乱舞』虚伝 燃ゆる本能寺〜再演〜), which took place from December 15, 2016 to January 17, 2017.

Giden: Akatsuki no Dokuganryū (舞台『刀剣乱舞』義伝 暁の独眼竜), ran from June 1, 2017, to July 14, 2017.

Gaiden: Kono Yora no Odawara (舞台『刀剣乱舞』外伝 此の夜らの小田原)

Joden: Mitsura Boshi Katanagatari (舞台『刀剣乱舞』ジョ伝 三つら星刀語り), ran from December 15, 2017 to December 29, 2017.

Hiden: Yui no Me no Hototogisu (舞台『刀剣乱舞』悲伝 結いの目の不如帰) ran from June to July 2018.

Jiden: Hibi no Ha Yo Chiruran (舞台『刀剣乱舞』慈伝 日日の葉よ散るらむ)

Iden: Oboro no Shishitachi (舞台『刀剣乱舞』維伝 朧の志士たち)

Kahakugeki Butai "Touken Ranbu / Tomoshibi" – ~~Kiden: Ikusa Yu no Adabana~~ – Kaihen Ikusa Yu no Adabana no Kioku (科白劇 舞台『刀剣乱舞/灯』~~綺伝 いくさ世の徒花~~ 改変 いくさ世の徒花の記憶)

Tenden: Aozora no Tsuwamono -Osaka Fuyu no Jin- (舞台『刀剣乱舞』天伝 蒼空の兵 -大阪冬の陣-)

Muden: Yuukure no Samurai -Osaka Natsu no Jin- (舞台『刀剣乱舞』无伝 夕紅の士 -大坂夏の陣-)

Kiden: Ikusa Yu no Adabana (舞台『刀剣乱舞』綺伝 いくさ世の徒花)

Guden: Mujun Genji Monogatari (舞台『刀剣乱舞』禺伝 矛盾源氏物語) ran from February 2 to February 12 in Tokyo and February 16 to February 19 in Osaka.[15] The play is the first Touken Ranbu stage with former Takarazuka Revue otokoyaku (male role) in the core formation and all-female cast including the ensemble.

Yamambagiri Kunihiro Tandokuko -Nihontoshi- (舞台『刀剣乱舞』山姥切国広 単独行 -日本刀史-)

Shiden: Tsuketari Kitan no Soumatou (舞台「刀剣乱舞」心伝 つけたり奇譚の走馬灯)

== Principal cast and characters ==
=== Main cast ===
Character	Kyoden: Moyuru Honnoji	Kyoden: Moyuru Honnoji ~Saien~	Giden: Akatsuki no Dokuganryu	Gaiden: Kono Yora no Odawara	Joden: Mitsuraboshi Katana Gatari	Hiden: Yui no Me no Hototogisu	Jiden: Hibi no Ha Yo Chiruran	Iden: Oboro no Shishitachi	Kahakugeki: Kaihen Ikusa Yu no Adabana no Kioku	Tenden: Aozora no Tsuwamono -Osaka Fuyu no Jin-	Muden: Yuukure no Samurai -Osaka Natsu no Jin-	Kiden: Ikusa Yu no Adabana	Guden: Mujun Genji Monogatari	Yamambagiri Kunihiro Tandokuko -Nihontoshi-	Shiden: Tsuketari Kitan no Soumatou
Mikazuki Munechika	Hiroki Suzuki	Hiroki Suzuki	Hiroki Suzuki		Hiroki Suzuki (voice)	Hiroki Suzuki	Hiroki Suzuki (voice)				Hiroki Suzuki				
Yamambagiri Kunihiro	Yoshihiko Aramaki	Yoshihiko Aramaki	Yoshihiko Aramaki	Yoshihiko Aramaki	Yoshihiko Aramaki	Yoshihiko Aramaki	Yoshihiko Aramaki	Yoshihiko Aramaki (voice)		Yoshihiko Aramaki	Yoshihiko Aramaki (voice)	Yoshihiko Aramaki (voice)		Yoshihiko Aramaki	
Soza Samonji	Yoshihide Sasaki	Yoshihide Sasaki								Yoshihide Sasaki					
Kosetsu Samonji	Teruma	Yusuke Seto													
Sayo Samonji	Takeru Naya	Takeru Naya	Takeru Naya	Takeru Naya	Takeru Naya		Takeru Naya								
Yagen Toshiro	Ryo Kitamura	Ryo Kitamura									Ryo Kitamura				
Heshikiri Hasebe	Masanari Wada	Masanari Wada		Masanari Wada	Masanari Wada	Masanari Wada	Masanari Wada				Masanari Wada				
Fudo Yukimitsu	Taizo Shiina	Taizo Shiina				Taizo Shiina	Taizo Shiina								
Ichigo Hitofuri	Daisuke Hirose	Daisuke Hirose								Reo Honda					
Namazuo Toshiro	Taishi Sugie	Taishi Sugie								Yo Maejima					
Shokudaikiri Mitsutada	Keisuke Higashi	Keisuke Higashi	Keisuke Higashi			Keisuke Higashi									
Tsurumaru Kuninaga	Toshiyuki Someya	Kento	Kento			Kento	Kento	Toshiyuki Someya			Toshiyuki Someya				
Okurikara			Hiroki Ino										Sho Ayanagi		
Taikogane Sadamune			Shohei Hashimoto												
Kasen Kanesada			Takuma Wada			Takuma Wada	Takuma Wada		Takuma Wada			Takuma Wada	Hiroki Nanami		
Honebami Toshiro				Naoya Kitagawa	Naoya Kitagawa	Ryo Mitsuya	Naoya Kitagawa			Naoya Kitagawa	Ryo Mitsuya				
Dodanuki Masakuni				Naoki Takeshi	Naoki Takeshi		Naoki Takeshi								
Yamabushi Kunihiro				Masafumi Yokoyama	Masafumi Yokoyama		Masafumi Yokoyama								
Nihongo				Yoshihiko Narimatsu	Yoshihiko Narimatsu										
Hakata Toshiro				Tsubasa Kizu	Tsubasa Kizu		Tsubasa Kizu								
Sohaya-no-Tsurugi				Yuta Iiyama	Yuta Iiyama		Yuta Iiyama								
Daihannya Nagamitsu						Shota Kawakami	Shota Kawakami								
Uguisumaru						Takahisa Maeyama	Takahisa Maeyama								
Okanehira						Sho Kato	Sho Kato								
Kogarasumaru						Yuki Tamaki		Yuki Tamaki							
Odenta Mitsuyo							Dai Isono								
Maeda Toshiro							Natsuki Osaki								
Gokotai							Ginga Shitara								
Tarotachi							Ryo Kobayashi								
Jirotachi							Ryotaro Kosaka								
Nansen Ichimonji							Riki Tanimizu						Shuu Shiotsuki		
Yamambagiri Chogi							Mizuki Umetsu		Mizuki Umetsu			Mizuki Umetsu			
Mutsunokami Yoshiyuki							Jin Aoki	Jin Aoki							
Hizen Tadahiro								Keito Sakurai							
Nankaitaro Choson								Daiki Miyoshi							
Izuminokami Kanesada								Rui Tabuchi							Rui Tabuchi
Horikawa Kunihiro								Eito Konishi							Eito Konishi
Nikkari Aoe									Mashiro Sano			Mashiro Sano			
Kikko Sadamune									Yuho Matsui			Yuho Matsui			
Shishio									Ryujiro Izaki			Ryujiro Izaki			
Kotegiri Go									Takuto Omi			Takuto Omi			
Kokindenju-no-Tachi									Ryo Tsukamoto			Ryo Tsukamoto			
Jizo Yukihira									Yuzuki Hoshimoto			Yuzuki Hoshimoto			
Kashuu Kiyomitsu										Ryo Matsuda					Ryo Matsuda
Taiko Samonji										Satsuki Kitano					
Juzumaru Tsunetsugu											Gaku Takamoto				
Ochidori Jumonjiyari											Shori Kondo				
Hanjin											Kaito Kumagai				
Ichimonji Norimune													Ouka Aya		Taiki Naito
Sanchoumou													Yuuko Mao		
Himetsuru Ichimonji													Sayato Sumiki		
Yamatonokami Yasusada															Keisuke Ueda
Nagasone Kotetsu															Gaku Matsuda
Magoroku Kanemoto															Shuya Sunagawa

== Critical reception ==
Approximately 40,000 people watched the final show of Kyoden: Moyuru Honnoji on May 20, 2016. The Blu-ray release of Kyoden: Moyuru Honnoji debuted at #1 on the Oricon Weekly Blu-ray Charts sold 24,175 copies in its first week, while the DVD release debuted at #2 on the Oricon Weekly DVD Charts with 18,242 copies.

== Discography ==
=== Soundtrack albums ===
Title	Details	Peak chart positions	Sales
Title	Details	JPN	Sales
Touken Ranbu the Stage: Kyoden: Moyuru Honnoji Original Soundtrack (舞台『刀剣乱舞』虚伝 燃ゆる本能寺 オリジナル・サウンドトラック)	Released: January 1, 2017; Label: Marvelous Entertainment; Formats: CD	14	
Touken Ranbu the Stage: Giden: Akatsuki no Dokuganryu Original Soundtrack (舞台『刀剣乱舞』義伝 暁の独眼竜 オリジナル・サウンドトラック)	Released: November 29, 2017; Label: Marvelous Entertainment; Formats: CD	12	
Touken Ranbu the Stage: Joden: Mitsura Boshi Katanagatari Original Soundtrack (舞台『刀剣乱舞』ジョ伝 三つら星刀語り オリジナル・サウンドトラック)	Released: May 2, 2018; Label: Marvelous Entertainment; Formats: CD	12	
Touken Ranbu the Stage: Hiden: Yui no Me no Hototogisu Original Soundtrack (舞台『刀剣乱舞』悲伝 結いの目の不如帰 オリジナル・サウンドトラック)	Released: November 28, 2018; Label: Marvelous Entertainment; Formats: CD	TBA	

== Anime adaptation ==
- Touken Ranbu Kai: Kyoden Moyuru Honnōji

刀剣乱舞 廻 -虚伝 燃ゆる本能寺-
- Anime television series
- Directed by: Kazuya Ichikawa
- Written by: Kenichi Suemitsu
- Music by: Ryūnosuke Kasai
- Studio: Domerica
- Licensed by: Crunchyroll
- Original network: Tokyo MX, BS11
- Original run: April 2, 2024 – May 21, 2024
- Episodes: 8
- Anime film

Ranbu Dо̄den: Chikashi Samuraira Umonora
- Directed by: Kazuya Ichikawa
- Written by: Kenichi Suemitsu
- Music by: Ryūnosuke Kasai
- Studio: Domerica
- Released: August 16, 2024

In May 2022, it was announced that the series' 2016 stage play Touken Ranbu Kyoden Moyuru Honnōji would be adapted into an anime. Kenichi Suemitsu, the play's director and playwright, will return to handle the scripts. In January 2024, it was confirmed to be a television series produced by Domerica and directed by Kazuya Ichikawa, with Mari Takada designing the characters and Ryūnosuke Kasai composing the music. Titled Touken Ranbu Kai: Kyoden Moyuru Honnōji, the series aired from April 2 to May 21, 2024.

A prequel anime film titled was announced after the final episode of the series on May 21, 2024. The staff and cast members from the series are reprising their roles. It premiered in Japanese theaters on August 16, 2024.

=== Cast ===
Characters	Japanese
Mikazuki Munechika	Kohsuke Toriumi
Yamanbagiri Kunihiro	Tomoaki Maeno
Sōza Samonji	Yūki Tai
Fudō Yukimitsu	Daisuke Sakaguchi
Heshikiri Hasebe	Tarusuke Shingaki
Yagen Tōshirō	Seiichiro Yamashita
Kōsetsu Samonji	Takuya Satō
Shokudaikiri Mitsutada	Takuya Satō
Sayo Samonji	Ayumu Murase
Namazuo Tōshirō	Soma Saito
Tsurumaru Kuninaga	Soma Saito
Ichigo Hitofuri	Atsushi Tamaru
