= Yoshihiko Aramaki =

Japanese actor and voice actor

- Born: February 5, 1990 (age 35); Tokyo, Japan
- Occupation: Actor
- Years active: 2011–present
- Agent: Pasture
- Height: 176 cm (5 ft 9 in)

Yoshihiko Aramaki (荒牧 慶彦, Aramaki Yoshihiko; born February 5, 1990) is a Japanese actor and voice actor who has portrayed characters for stage, films, television and video games. Yoshihiko also has a history of theatre, including the Live Act "BlazBlue" ~Continuum Shift~ as Jin Kisaragi (2014), Ruritsubame Blues (2015), Cute High Earth Defense Club Love! as Zaō Ryū (2016), Jiden: Hibi no Ya Yo Chiruran (2019), and Bakuman THE STAGE as Takagi Akito (2021).

== Selected filmography ==
=== Television ===
Year	Title	Role	Notes
2013	Raspberry Boy		
2017	Love Concierge		
2017	Sanrio Characters Pompon Jump!		
2017	Sengoku Night Blood	Uesugi Kagekatsu	
2018	Sono Toki, Kanojo wa	Kousuke	
2019	TV Theater Success Sou	Sir	
2019	Aristocratic Birth: Prince of Legend	Juukiya	
2019-2021	Real Fake	Nagisa Makino	
2020	TV Theater Success Sou 2	Sir	
2021	FAKE MOTION: Tatta Hitotsu no Negai	Oda Sanosuke	

=== Film ===
Year	Title	Role	Notes
	MOONBOW	Itsuki	
	Shuukatsu 3		
2014	Dance! Dance! Dance!	Ikegami Takumi	
2015	Youth Discovery Film - Always Youth Edition - Pure Love Stalker	Sawashima	
2016	Article 9	Dai Kyu Jo	
2017	Oedo no Candy 2 - The Birds of Paradise	Tsuge Takeshi	
2017	Unusual Occupation	Shinya	
2019	Touken Ranbu	Yamanbagiri Kunihiro	
2022	Mankai Movie A3!: Autumn & Winter	Tsukioka Tsumugi	

=== Stage ===
Year	Title	Role	Notes
2025	Cherry Magic! Thirty Years of Virginity Can Make You a Wizard?!	Yūichi Kurosawa	
2025	Oblivion Battery	Kei Kaname	

=== Video games ===
- Ikemen vampire (2017) as Vincent van Gogh
- Sengoku Night Blood (2017) as Uesugi Kagekatsu
- Granblue Fantasy Versus (2019) as Fehr
- Wind boys! (2020)
- ALTDEUS: Beyond Chronos (2020) as Aoba Iwaza
