= Aozakura =

Japanese manga series

- First tankōbon volume cover

あおざくら 防衛大学校物語
- Genre: Coming-of-age; Military
- Manga
- Written by: Hikaru Nikaidō
- Published by: Shogakukan
- Imprint: Shōnen Sunday Comics
- Magazine: Weekly Shōnen Sunday
- Original run: April 27, 2016 – present
- Volumes: 38
- Television drama
- Directed by: Katsuri Hirabayashi
- Written by: Erika Yoshida; Takeshi Miyamoto
- Original network: MBS
- Original run: October 31, 2019 – November 28, 2019
- Episodes: 5
- icon

Aozakura: Bōei Daigakukō Monogatari (あおざくら 防衛大学校物語; lit. 'Aozakura: The Story of National Defense Academy') is a Japanese manga series written and illustrated by Hikaru Nikaidō. It has been serialized in Shogakukan's shōnen manga magazine Weekly Shōnen Sunday since April 2016, with its chapters collected in 38 tankōbon volumes as of November 2026. It was adapted into a five-episode Japanese television drama broadcast on MBS from October to November 2019.

== Plot ==
Isami Kondo (近藤 勇美, Kondō Isami), a high-achieving high school senior, faces financial hardship when his family's diner nears bankruptcy, forcing him to reconsider his future. Learning that the National Defense Academy offers full tuition coverage and a monthly stipend, he decides to enroll, seeking both stability and purpose. The series chronicles Isami's evolution from an uncertain freshman to a disciplined leader, shaped by camaraderie, adversity, and self-discovery within the academy's demanding environment.

== Media ==
=== Manga ===
Written and illustrated by Hikaru Nikaidō, Aozakura: Bōei Daigakukō Monogatari started in Shogakukan's shōnen manga magazine Weekly Shōnen Sunday on April 27, 2016. Shogakukan has compiled its chapters into individual tankōbon volumes. The first volume was published on September 16, 2016. As of November 18, 2026, 38 volumes have been released.

==== Volumes ====
No.	Japanese release date	Japanese ISBN
1	September 16, 2016	978-4-09-127340-6
2	December 16, 2016	978-4-09-127425-0
3	March 17, 2017	978-4-09-127508-0
4	June 16, 2017	978-4-09-127574-5
5	September 15, 2017	978-4-09-127684-1
6	December 18, 2017	978-4-09-127877-7
7	March 16, 2018	978-4-09-128093-0
8	June 18, 2018	978-4-09-128256-9
9	September 18, 2018	978-4-09-128395-5
10	December 18, 2018	978-4-09-128593-5
11	March 18, 2019	978-4-09-128803-5
12	June 18, 2019	978-4-09-129167-7
13	September 18, 2019	978-4-09-129330-5
14	November 18, 2019	978-4-09-129445-6
15	February 18, 2020	978-4-09-129560-6
16	April 16, 2020	978-4-09-850066-6
17	July 17, 2020	978-4-09-850164-9
18	October 16, 2020	978-4-09-850271-4
19	January 18, 2021	978-4-09-850380-3
20	April 16, 2021	978-4-09-850518-0
21	July 16, 2021	978-4-09-850633-0
22	October 18, 2021	978-4-09-850722-1
23	January 18, 2022	978-4-09-850863-1
23	April 18, 2022	978-4-09-851057-3
25	July 15, 2022	978-4-09-851184-6
26	October 18, 2022	978-4-09-851348-2
27	January 18, 2023	978-4-09-851531-8
28	April 18, 2023	978-4-09-852028-2
29	July 18, 2023	978-4-09-852612-3
30	October 18, 2023	978-4-09-852854-7
31	January 18, 2024	978-4-09-853074-8
32	April 17, 2024	978-4-09-853221-6
33	July 18, 2024	978-4-09-853435-7
34	October 18, 2024	978-4-09-853636-8
35	January 17, 2025	978-4-09-853814-0
36	April 18, 2025	978-4-09-854081-5
37	August 18, 2026	978-4-09-854742-5
38	November 18, 2026	978-4-09-855005-0

=== Drama ===
A five-episode television drama was broadcast on MBS from October 31 to November 28, 2019.
