= Haikyu!! (disambiguation) =

Haikyu!! is a Japanese manga series written by Haruichi Furudate. It may also refer to:

- List of Haikyu!! episodes, an episode guide for the anime adaptation
- Haikyu!! The Dumpster Battle, a 2024 anime film adaptation
- Hyper Projection Engeki: Haikyu!!, a stage play adaptation of the manga
