= List of Haikyu!! episodes =

Key visual for the series

Haikyu!! is an anime television series based on the manga series of the same name by Haruichi Furudate. The anime television series adaptation produced by Production I.G was announced on September 22, 2013. The series is directed by Susumu Mitsunaka, with Taku Kishimoto handling series composition, Takahiro Kishida providing character designs, and Yuki Hayashi and Asami Tachibana composed the music. The story follows Shoyo Hinata, a boy determined to become a great volleyball player despite his small stature. It also focused on the Karasuno High School volleyball team and the relationship between players Hinata and Tobio Kageyama.

The first season aired from April 6 to September 21, 2014, on MBS, other JNN stations, and with English subtitles on Crunchyroll. It has been licensed for digital and home video release by Sentai Filmworks. A second season aired from October 4, 2015, to March 27, 2016. A third season, titled Haikyu!! Karasuno High School vs Shiratorizawa Academy (ハイキュー!! 烏野高校 VS 白鳥沢学園高校, Haikyū!! Karasuno Kōkō VS Shiratorizawa Gakuen Kōkō), aired from October 8 to December 10, 2016. Sentai Filmworks has also licensed the third season.

A fourth season, titled Haikyu!! To The Top (ハイキュー!! TO THE TOP), was announced at the Jump Festa '19 event, with a "kickoff event" for the new series being held on September 22, 2019. Masako Satō replaced Susumu Mitsunaka as director, with the returning staff from the previous seasons. The fourth season premiered on January 11, 2020, on the Super Animeism block. It was later announced that the fourth season would be split-cour, with the second cour supposedly to air in July 2020 but was delayed due to the COVID-19 pandemic. The second cour aired from October 3 to December 19, 2020. Crunchyroll simulcasted the fourth season. Recently, the anime series ran for 85 episodes overall. The series uses fourteen different songs for credits music: seven opening themes and seven ending themes.

Multiple original video animation (OVA) episodes have been released. "The Arrival of Lev!" was released on November 9, 2014, following the first season, "Vs. "Failing Grades"" was released on May 2, 2016, following the second season, and "Special Feature! Betting on the Spring High Volleyball" was released on August 4, 2017, following the third season. Two new OVA episodes, "Land vs. Sky" and "The Path of the Ball" were released on January 22, 2020, at the beginning of the fourth season.

== Series overview ==
Season	Episodes		Originally released	
Season	Episodes		First released	Last released
1	25		April 6, 2014	September 21, 2014
2	25		October 4, 2015	March 27, 2016
3	10		October 8, 2016	December 10, 2016
4	25	13	January 11, 2020	April 4, 2020
4	25	12	October 3, 2020	December 19, 2020

== Episodes ==
=== Season 1 (2014) ===
No. overall	No. in season	Title	Directed by	Written by	Original release date
1	1	"The End and The Beginning"; Transliteration: "Owari to hajimari" (Japanese: 終わりと始まり)	Susumu Mitsunaka	Taku Kishimoto	April 6, 2014
2	2	"Karasuno High School Volleyball Team"; Transliteration: "Karasuno kōkō haikyūbu" (Japanese: 烏野高校排球部)	Kōichi Kikuta	Taku Kishimoto	April 13, 2014
3	3	"A Formidable Ally"; Transliteration: "Saikyō no mikata" (Japanese: 最強の味方)	Tomoko Hiramuki	Taku Kishimoto	April 20, 2014
4	4	"The View From the Summit"; Transliteration: "Itadaki no keshiki" (Japanese: 頂の景色)	Shintarō Itoga	Taku Kishimoto	April 27, 2014
5	5	"A Coward's Anxiety"; Transliteration: "Shōshinmono no kinchō" (Japanese: 小心者の緊張)	Yasuo Ejima	Taku Kishimoto	May 4, 2014
6	6	"An Interesting Team"; Transliteration: "Omoshiroi chīmu" (Japanese: 面白いチーム)	Tomohiro Hirata	Taku Kishimoto	May 11, 2014
7	7	"Versus the Great King"; Transliteration: "VS "Daiō-sama"" (Japanese: VS "大王様")	Rokō Ogiwara	Taku Kishimoto	May 18, 2014
8	8	"The One They Call "Ace""; Transliteration: ""Ēsu" to yobareru hito" (Japanese: "エース"と呼ばれる人)	Yoshihide Ibata	Takuya Satō	May 25, 2014
9	9	"A Set For the Ace"; Transliteration: "Ēsu e no tosu" (Japanese: エースへのトス)	Mariko Ishikawa	Taku Kishimoto	June 1, 2014
10	10	"Yearning"; Transliteration: "Akogare" (Japanese: 憧れ)	Shintarō Itoga	Taku Kishimoto	June 8, 2014
11	11	"The Decision"; Transliteration: "Ketsudan" (Japanese: 決断)	Hirotaka Endō	Taku Kishimoto	June 15, 2014
12	12	"The Cat and Crow Reunion"; Transliteration: "Neko to karasu no saikai" (Japanese: ネコとカラスの再会)	Yasuo Ejima	Toshimitsu Takeuchi	June 22, 2014
13	13	"Worthy Adversaries"; Transliteration: "Raibaru" (Japanese: 好敵手(ライバル))	Takaaki Suzuki	Toshimitsu Takeuchi	June 29, 2014
14	14	"Formidable Opponents"; Transliteration: "Kyōteki-tachi" (Japanese: 強敵たち)	Tomoko Hiramuki	Taku Kishimoto	July 6, 2014
15	15	"Revival"; Transliteration: "Fukkatsu" (Japanese: 復活)	Kiyoshi Murayama	Taku Kishimoto	July 13, 2014
16	16	"Winners and Losers"; Transliteration: "Shousha to haisha" (Japanese: 勝者と敗者)	Shintarō Itoga	Taku Kishimoto	July 20, 2014
17	17	"The Iron Wall"; Transliteration: "Teppeki" (Japanese: 鉄壁)	Takashi Ōtsuka	Toshimitsu Takeuchi	July 27, 2014
18	18	"Guarding Your Back"; Transliteration: "Senaka no mamori" (Japanese: 背中の護り)	Yumi Kamakura	Toshimitsu Takeuchi	August 3, 2014
19	19	"The Conductor"; Transliteration: "Shikisha" (Japanese: 指揮者)	Hirotaka Endō	Taku Kishimoto	August 10, 2014
20	20	"Oikawa Toru Is Not a Genius"; Transliteration: "Oikawa Tooru wa tensai dewanai" (Japanese: 及川徹は天才ではない)	Shintarō Itoga	Taku Kishimoto	August 17, 2014
21	21	"Senpai's True Abilities"; Transliteration: "Senpai no jitsuryoku" (Japanese: 先輩の実力)	Tomoko Hiramuki; Tetsuaki Watanabe	Taku Kishimoto	August 24, 2014
22	22	"Evolution"; Transliteration: "Shinka" (Japanese: 進化)	Toshiaki Kanbara	Taku Kishimoto	August 31, 2014
23	23	"The Play to Shift the Momentum"; Transliteration: "Nagare o kaeru ippon" (Japanese: 流れを変える一本)	Kōichi Kikuta	Taku Kishimoto	September 7, 2014
24	24	"'Lonely King' No More"; Transliteration: "Datsu "kodoku no ou-sama"" (Japanese: 脱・"孤独の王様")	Susumu Mitsunaka	Taku Kishimoto	September 14, 2014
25	25	"The Third Day"; Transliteration: "Mikka-me" (Japanese: 三日目)	Jōji Furuta	Taku Kishimoto	September 21, 2014

=== Season 2 (2015–16) ===
No. overall	No. in season	Title	Directed by	Written by	Original release date
26	1	"Let's Go to Tokyo!"; Transliteration: "Rettsu gō Tōkyō!!" (Japanese: レッツゴートーキョー!!)	Susumu Mitsunaka	Taku Kishimoto	October 4, 2015
27	2	"Direct Sunlight"; Transliteration: "Chokusha nikkō" (Japanese: 直射日光)	Yoshitaka Koyama	Susumu Mitsunaka	October 11, 2015
28	3	"'Townsperson B'"; Transliteration: ""Murabito B"" (Japanese: "村人B")	Shintarō Nakazawa	Susumu Mitsunaka	October 18, 2015
29	4	"'Center Ace'"; Transliteration: ""Sentā ēsu"" (Japanese: "センターエース")	Mariko Ishikawa	Taku Kishimoto	October 25, 2015
30	5	"'Greed'"; Transliteration: ""Yoku"" (Japanese: 『欲』)	Tomoko Hiramuki; Tetsuaki Watanabe	Taku Kishimoto	November 1, 2015
31	6	"'Tempo'"; Transliteration: ""Tenpo"" (Japanese: "テンポ")	Hirotaka Mori	Taku Kishimoto	November 8, 2015
32	7	"Moonrise"; Transliteration: "Tsukinode" (Japanese: 月の出)	Shintarō Itoga	Taku Kishimoto	November 15, 2015
33	8	"Illusionary Hero"; Transliteration: "Genkaku hīrō" (Japanese: 幻覚ヒーロー)	Masako Satō	Taku Kishimoto	November 22, 2015
34	9	"Vs. 'Umbrella'"; Transliteration: "VS "Kasa"" (Japanese: VS"傘")	Shintarō Itoga	Taku Kishimoto	November 29, 2015
35	10	"Gears"; Transliteration: "Haguruma" (Japanese: 歯車)	Shintarō Nakazawa	Taku Kishimoto	December 6, 2015
36	11	"'Above'"; Transliteration: ""Ue"" (Japanese: "上")	Tetsuaki Watanabe	Taku Kishimoto	December 13, 2015
37	12	"Let the Games Begin!"; Transliteration: "Shiai Kaishi" (Japanese: 試合開始!!)	Itsurō Kawasaki	Takuya Satō	December 20, 2015
38	13	"Simple And Pure Strength"; Transliteration: "Shinpuru de junsui na chikara" (Japanese: シンプルで純粋な力)	Yūsuke Sunouchi	Takuya Satō	December 27, 2015
39	14	"Still Growing"; Transliteration: "Sodachizagari" (Japanese: 育ち盛り)	Kōji Komurakata	Taku Kishimoto	January 10, 2016
40	15	"A Place To Play"; Transliteration: "Asobiba" (Japanese: アソビバ)	Tetsuaki Watanabe	Taku Kishimoto	January 17, 2016
41	16	"Next"; Transliteration: "Tsugi e" (Japanese: 次へ)	Shintarō Itoga	Taku Kishimoto	January 24, 2016
42	17	"The Battle Without Will Power"; Transliteration: "Konjou nashi no Tatakai" (Japanese: 根性無しの戦い)	Yūsuke Kaneda	Taku Kishimoto	January 31, 2016
43	18	"The Losers"; Transliteration: "Haibokusha-tachi" (Japanese: 敗北者達)	Takashi Andō	Taku Kishimoto	February 7, 2016
44	19	"The Iron Wall Can Be Built Again and Again"; Transliteration: "Teppeki wa Nando demo Kizukareru" (Japanese: 鉄壁は何度でも築かれる)	Masako Satō	Taku Kishimoto	February 14, 2016
45	20	"Wiping Out"; Transliteration: "Fusshoku" (Japanese: 払拭)	Shintarō Nakazawa	Taku Kishimoto	February 21, 2016
46	21	"The Destroyer"; Transliteration: "Kowashi-ya" (Japanese: 壊し屋)	Shintarō Itoga	Taku Kishimoto	February 28, 2016
47	22	"The Former Coward's Fight"; Transliteration: "Moto okubyōmono no tatakai" (Japanese: 元・根性無しの戦い)	Yūsuke Kaneda	Taku Kishimoto	March 6, 2016
48	23	"'Team'"; Transliteration: ""Chīmu"" (Japanese: "チーム")	Tetsuaki Watanabe	Taku Kishimoto	March 13, 2016
49	24	"The Absolute Limit Switch"; Transliteration: "Kyokugen suitchi" (Japanese: 極限スイッチ)	Susumu Mitsunaka	Taku Kishimoto	March 20, 2016
50	25	"Declaration of War"; Transliteration: "Sensen fukoku" (Japanese: 宣戦布告)	Yumi Kamakura	Taku Kishimoto	March 27, 2016

=== Season 3 (2016) ===
No. overall	No. in season	Title	Directed by	Written by	Original release date
51	1	"Greetings"; Transliteration: "Goaisatsu" (Japanese: ごあいさつ)	Hirotaka Mori	Susumu Mitsunaka	October 8, 2016
52	2	"The Threat of "Left""; Transliteration: ""Hidari" no kyōi" (Japanese: "左"の脅威)	Haruo Okuno	Taku Kishimoto	October 15, 2016
53	3	"The Guessing Monster" (Japanese: GUESS・MONSTER)	Shintarō Itoga	Taku Kishimoto	October 22, 2016
54	4	"The Halo Around the Moon"; Transliteration: "Tsuki no wa" (Japanese: 月の輪)	Masako Satō	Taku Kishimoto	October 29, 2016
55	5	"One vs. Many"; Transliteration: "Ko vs. kazu" (Japanese: 個VS数)	Tetsuaki Watanabe	Taku Kishimoto	November 5, 2016
56	6	"The Chemical Change of Encounters"; Transliteration: "Deai no kagaku henka" (Japanese: 出会いの化学変化)	Shintarō Itoga	Susumu Mitsunaka	November 12, 2016
57	7	"Obsession"; Transliteration: "Kodawari" (Japanese: こだわり)	Yūsuke Kaneda	Taku Kishimoto	November 19, 2016
58	8	"An Annoying Guy"; Transliteration: "Iya na otoko" (Japanese: 嫌な男)	Hitomi Ezoe	Susumu Mitsunaka	November 26, 2016
59	9	"The Volleyball Freaks"; Transliteration: "Barē baka-tachi" (Japanese: バレー馬鹿たち)	Shintarō Itoga	Taku Kishimoto	December 3, 2016
60	10	"A Battle of Concepts"; Transliteration: "Konseputo no tatakai" (Japanese: コンセプトの戦い)	Tetsuaki Watanabe	Taku Kishimoto	December 10, 2016

=== Season 4 (2020) ===
No. overall	No. in season	Title	Directed by	Written by	Original release date
Part 1
61	1	"Introductions"; Transliteration: "Jiko shōkai" (Japanese: 自己紹介)	Masako Satō	Taku Kishimoto	January 11, 2020
62	2	"Lost"; Transliteration: "Maigo" (Japanese: 迷子)	Takahiro Ōtsuka	Taku Kishimoto	January 18, 2020
63	3	"Perspective"; Transliteration: "Shiten" (Japanese: 視点)	Yasushi Muroya	Taku Kishimoto	January 25, 2020
64	4	""Taking it Easy""; Transliteration: ""Raku"" (Japanese: "楽")	Hideya Itō	Taku Kishimoto	February 1, 2020
65	5	"Hunger"; Transliteration: "Kūfuku" (Japanese: 空腹)	Tomoe Makino	Taku Kishimoto	February 8, 2020
66	6	"Enhancements"; Transliteration: "Kōyō" (Japanese: 昂揚)	Masayo Nozaki	Taku Kishimoto	February 15, 2020
67	7	"Return"; Transliteration: "Henkan" (Japanese: 返還)	Hideya Itō	Taku Kishimoto	February 22, 2020
68	8	"Challenger"; Transliteration: "Charenjā" (Japanese: チャレンジャー)	Tomoe Makino	Taku Kishimoto	February 29, 2020
69	9	"Everyone's Night"; Transliteration: "Sorezore no yoru" (Japanese: それぞれの夜)	Hiromichi Matano	Taku Kishimoto	March 7, 2020
70	10	"Battle Lines"; Transliteration: "Sensen" (Japanese: 戦線)	Toshiyuki Sone	Taku Kishimoto	March 14, 2020
71	11	"A Chance to Extend the Rally"; Transliteration: "Tsunagareru chansu" (Japanese: 繋がれるチャンス)	Hitomi Ezoe; Masako Satō	Taku Kishimoto	March 21, 2020
72	12	"Vivid"; Transliteration: "Senretsu" (Japanese: 鮮烈)	Hideya Itō	Taku Kishimoto	March 28, 2020
73	13	"Day Two"; Transliteration: "Futsuka-me" (Japanese: 2日目)	Yumi Kamakura	Taku Kishimoto	April 4, 2020
Part 2
74	14	"Rhythm"; Transliteration: "Rizumu" (Japanese: リズム)	Hitomi Ezoe	Taku Kishimoto	October 3, 2020
75	15	"Found"; Transliteration: "Mitsukeru" (Japanese: 見つける)	Rokō Ogiwara	Taku Kishimoto	October 10, 2020
76	16	"Broken Heart"; Transliteration: "Shitsuren" (Japanese: 失恋)	Yūji Horiuchi	Taku Kishimoto	October 17, 2020
77	17	"Cats vs Monkeys"; Transliteration: "Neko VS Saru" (Japanese: ネコVSサル)	Pyeon-Gang Ho	Taku Kishimoto	October 24, 2020
78	18	"Trap"; Transliteration: "Wana" (Japanese: 罠)	Hitomi Ezoe	Taku Kishimoto	October 31, 2020
79	19	"The Ultimate Challengers"; Transliteration: "Saikyō no chōsen-sha" (Japanese: 最強の挑戦者)	Pyeon-Gang Ho	Taku Kishimoto	November 7, 2020
80	20	"Leader"; Transliteration: "Kashira" (Japanese: 頭)	Yūji Horiuchi	Taku Kishimoto	November 14, 2020
81	21	"Hero"; Transliteration: "Hīrō" (Japanese: ヒーロー)	Yumi Kamakura	Taku Kishimoto	November 21, 2020
82	22	"Pitons"; Transliteration: "Hāken" (Japanese: ハーケン)	Masako Satō	Taku Kishimoto	November 28, 2020
83	23	"The Birth of the Serene King"; Transliteration: "Shizukanaru ō no tanjō" (Japanese: 静かなる王の誕生)	Rokō Ogiwara	Taku Kishimoto	December 5, 2020
84	24	"Monsters' Ball"; Transliteration: "Bakemon-tachi no utage" (Japanese: バケモンたちの宴)	Yumi Kamakura	Taku Kishimoto	December 12, 2020
85	25	"The Promised Land"; Transliteration: "Yakusoku no Chi" (Japanese: 約束の地)	Hitomi Ezoe	Taku Kishimoto	December 19, 2020

== OVAs ==
No.	Title	Directed by	Written by	Original release date
OVA–1	"The Arrival of Lev!"; Transliteration: "Riēfu genkan!" (Japanese: リエーフ見参！)	Shintarō Nakazawa	Taku Kishimoto	November 9, 2014
Nekoma High School's volleyball team recruits a new member: the half-Japanese, half-Russian Haiba Lev. Though the self-proclaimed ace is blessed with great height, he lacks basic volleyball techniques. This gives the team's setter, Kozume Kenma, a hard time when matching up with him. To everyone's surprise, Nekoma's coach suggests that Lev play in the Kunihira Senior High School's practice match, leaving Kenma no choice but to cooperate with the tall player.
OVA–2	"Vs. "Failing Grades""; Transliteration: "VS "Akaten"" (Japanese: VS"赤点")	Shintarō Nakazawa	Taku Kishimoto	May 2, 2016
This episode goes into details about the event surrounding Hinata's and Kageyama's failing grades, along with Tanaka attempting to let them get a ride to Tokyo.
OVA–3	"Special Feature! Betting on the Spring High Volleyball"; Transliteration: "Tokushū! Haru-kō Volley ni Kaketa Seishun" (Japanese: 特集！春高バレーに賭けた青春)	Susumu Mitsunaka	Taku Kishimoto	August 4, 2017
A news broadcast focusing on the Miyagi Prefecture Spring Interhigh Qualifier featuring footage of the matches and interviews with the players.
OVA–4	"Land vs. Sky"; Transliteration: "Riku VS kū" (Japanese: 陸VS空)	Masako Satō	Taku Kishimoto	January 22, 2020
An intense battle rages on at the Tokyo Qualifiers for the three remaining spots in the national volleyball competition. Nekoma High School, Fukurōdani High School, Nohebi Academy, and Itachiyama Academy all passionately strive to participate in the tournament. In the second semi-final, Nekoma was matched with Fukurōdani. Itachiyama and Fukurōdani respectively won both their sets and went to the finals, leaving behind Nekoma and Nohebi to compete for the final spot for the nationals.
OVA–5	"The "Path" of the Ball"; Transliteration: "Bōru no "michi"" (Japanese: ボールの"道")	Masako Satō	Taku Kishimoto	January 22, 2020
The match between Nekoma and Nohebi continues with Nohebi in the lead with 16-13. Yaku may have sprained his ankle when he accidentally stepped on a spectator's foot and landed awkwardly. Nohebi are targeting Shibayama as the weak link on the team. Kenma gives instructions and words of encouragement to his teammates, and they continue the match. Shibayama apologizes to the team for being unable to save the ball and Lev tells him that he is not Yaku. Both teams refuse to drop the ball. To avoid Lev's block, Kuguri spikes to the side and Shibayama receives the ball. Yamamoto spikes the ball against the blocker's hands and it ricochets out of bounds meaning the end of the match, and Nekoma has secured a spot to nationals. Meanwhile in the finals, Itachiyama edge out Fukurōdani with 2-1 set victory. Hinata received an email from Kenma stating that they have won and they will be heading for nationals.

== See also ==
- List of Haikyu!! chapters
- List of Haikyu!! characters
