= List of Haikyu!! chapters =

Haikyu!! (ハイキュー!!) was a Japanese manga series written and illustrated by Haruichi Furudate. Individual chapters were serialized weekly in the shōnen manga anthology Weekly Shōnen Jump from February 2012 through July 2020. The ending in Chapter 402 was released in Weekly Shonen Jump Issue 33, 2020 on July 20, 2020. The series was initially published as a one-shot in Shueisha's seasonal Jump NEXT! magazine prior to serialization. As of November 2020, forty-five volumes have been released in Japan.A spin-off titled Haikyubu!! (ハイキュー部!!, Haikyū-bu!!), illustrated by Kyōhei Miyajima, was released in Shueisha's Shonen Jump+ website on May 13, 2019. Volumes 2 and 3, along with Volume 43 of the original manga, were set to be released on May 1, 2020, but was delayed to May 13, 2020, due to COVID-19 concerns. Nine volumes have been published as of January 2023.

== Volumes ==
No.	Title	Original release date	English release date
1	Hinata and Kageyama; Hinata to Kageyama (日向と影山)	June 4, 2012; 978-4-08-870453-1	July 5, 2016; 978-1-4215-8766-0
1. "Endings and Beginnings" (終わりと始まり, "Owari to Hajimari"); 2. "Karasuno High School Volleyball Club" (烏野高校排球部, "Karasuno Kōkō Haikyū bu"); 3. "Single-Celled Organisms" (単細胞生物, "Tansaibō-Seibutsu"); 4. "The Greatest Teammate" (最強の味方, "Saikyō no Mikata"); 5. "The King of The Court" (コート上の王様, "Kōto-jō no Ōsama"); 6. "Middle School Story" (中学のハナシ, "Chūgaku no Hanashi"); 7. "Words from The Have-Nots" ("持たざる物"のことば, ""Motazarumono" no Kotoba")
2	The View From The Top; Itadaki no Keshiki (頂の景色)	August 3, 2012; 978-4-08-870482-1	August 2, 2016; 978-1-4215-8767-7
8. "The View from the Top" (頂の景色, "Itadaki no Keshiki"); 9. "Birth of a Combo" (コンビ誕生。, "Konbi Tanjō."); 10. "Rookie Nerves" (小心者の緊張, "Shōshin-sha no Kinchō"); 11. "Reunion and Failure" ("再会"と"大失敗", ""Saikai" to "Dai Shippai""); 12. "Back to Normal" (通常運転, "Tsūjō Unten"); 13. "An Interesting Team" ("面白いチーム", ""Omoshiroi Chīmu""); 14. "VS. the Great King" (VS"大王様", "VS "Daiō-sama""); 15. "Chemical Reaction" (化学変化, "Kagaku Henka"); 16. "Another Prodigy" (もう1人の天才, "Mō 1-ri no Tensai"); Bonus Story "Tanaka senpai's Nightmare" (田中せんぱいの悪夢, "Tanaka-senpai no Akumu")
3	Go, Team Karasuno! Chīmu Karasuno, Shidō (チーム烏野、始動)	October 4, 2012; 978-4-08-870521-7	September 6, 2016; 978-1-4215-8768-4
17. "Storm" (嵐, "Arashi"); 18. "The One Known as the Ace" ("エース"と呼ばれるひと, ""Ēsu" to Yobareru Hito"); 19. "Honest Feelings" (本音, "Honne"); 20. "Guardian Deity" ("守護神", ""Shugoshin""); 21. "Setting for the Ace" (エースへのトス, "Ēsu e no Tosu"); 22. "Idolization" (憧れ, "Akogare"); 23. "Same One Point" (同じ1点, "Onaji Itten"); 24. "Go, Team Karasuno!" (チーム烏野、始動, "Chīmu Karasuno, Shidō"); 25. "Random Encounter" (遭遇, "Sōgū"); Bonus Story "What Really Happened with the T-Shirts" (Tシャツ裏事情, "Tīshatsu ura Jijō")
4	Rivals! Raibaru (ライバル)	January 4, 2013; 978-4-08-870555-2	October 4, 2016; 978-1-4215-8769-1
26. "The Decision" (決断, "Ketsudan"); 27. "The Cat-Crow Reunion" (ネコとカラスの再会, "Neko to Karasu no Saikai"); 28. "A Monster and His Club" ("鬼"と"金棒", ""Oni" to "Kanabō""); 29. "The Brain" ("脳", ""Nō""); 30. "How to Fly" (飛びかた, "Tobikata"); 31. "Rivals!" (ライバル, "Raibaru"); 32. "Grown Cat vs. Baby Crow" (大人ネコと雛カラス, "Otona Neko to Hina Karasu"); 33. "What It Means to Connect" ("繋ぐ"ということ, ""Tsunagu" to Iu Koto"); 34. "Vow for a Rematch" (再戦を誓って, "Saisen o Chikatte"); Bonus Story "The Pudding Head Story" (『プリンヘッド物語』, ""Purin Heddo Monogatari"")
5	Inter-high Begins! Intāhai Totsunyū! (インターハイ突入!)	March 4, 2013; 978-4-08-870631-3	November 1, 2016; 978-1-4215-8770-7
35. "Powerful Opponents" (強敵たち, "Kyōteki-tachi"); 36. "Preparing for Flight" (飛行準備, "Hikō Junbi"); 37. "It Begins" (突入, "Totsunyū"); 38. "Warm-Ups" (ウォームアップ, "Uōmuappu"); 39. "The Return" (復活, "Fukkatsu"); 40. "Winners and Losers" (勝者と敗者, "Shōsha to Haisha"); 41. "Round 2" (2回戦突入, "2-kaisen Totsunyū"); 42. "The Iron Wall" (鉄壁, "Teppeki"); 43. "Freak Quick Unleashed" ("変人速攻"解禁, ""Henjin Sokkō" Kaikin"); 44. "The Greatest Decoy" ("最強の囮", ""Saikyō no Otori"")
6	Setter Battle! Za Settā Taiketsu (ザ・セッター対決)	May 2, 2013; 978-4-08-870666-5	December 6, 2016; 978-1-4215-8858-2
45. "Behind The Light" ("光"の裏側, ""Hikari" no Uragawa"); 46. "Got Your Back" ("エース", "Ēsu"); 47. "Aces and Heroes" (エースとヒーロー, "Ēsu to Hīrō"); 48. "The Conductor" ("指揮者", ""Shikisha""); 49. "Vs. the Great King: Part 2" (VS "大王様"・2, "VS "Daiō-sama" 2"); 50. "Setter Battle!" (ザ・セッター対決, "Za Settā Taiketsu"); 51. "The Strength of a Powerhouse" ("強豪"と呼ばれる実力, ""Kyōgō" to Yobareru Jitsuryoku"); 52. "Makings of an Ace" (エースの資質, "Ēsu no Shishitsu"); 53. "Tohru Oikawa Is No Prodigy" (及川徹は天才ではない, "Oikawa Tōru wa Tensaide Wanai"); Bonus Story "Haikyū!! Extra Chapter" (ハイキュー‼ 番外編, "Haikyū!! Bangaihen")
7	Evolution; Shinka (進化)	August 2, 2013; 978-4-08-870786-0	January 3, 2017; 978-1-4215-9062-2
54. "Upperclassman's Strength" ("先輩"の実力, ""Senpai" no Jitsuryoku"); 55. "My Best and Your Best" ("俺のベスト"と"お前のベスト", ""Ore no Besuto" to "Omae no Besuto""); 56. "The Elite Few" (少数精鋭, "Shōsū Seiei"); 57. "Break" ("ブレイク", ""Bureiku""); 58. "Back to Normal: Part 2" (通常運転・2, "Tsūjō Unten 2"); 59. "Direct Communication" ("真っ向コミュニケーション", ""Makkō Komyunikēshon""); 60. "Evolution" (進化, "Shinka"); 61. "Base Talent and a Little Monster" (チームの地力と小さなケモノ, "Chīmu no Jiriki to Chīsana Kemono"); 62. "The Whole Width of the Court" (コートの横幅めいっぱい, "Kōto no Yokohaba-me-ippai")
8	Former Lonely Tyrant "Datsu "Kodoku no Ōsama" (脱・"孤独の王様")	October 4, 2013; 978-4-08-870820-1	February 7, 2017; 978-1-4215-9098-1
63. "Momentum Swing" (流れを変える1本, "Nagare o Kaeru 1-pon"); 64. "Momentum Swing: Part 2" (流れを変える1本・2, "Nagare o Kaeru 1-pon 2"); 65. "Catching Up" (背中, "Senaka"); 66. "Again" ("もう1回", "Mou ikkai"); 67. "Smiles" (笑顔, "Egao"); 68. "Former Lonely Tyrant" (脱・"孤独の王様", "Datsu "Kodoku no Ōsama""); 69. "The Losers" (敗者, "Haisha"); 70. "Day 3" ("3日目", "3-nichi-me"); 71. "Regrets and New Goals" (後悔と目標, "Kōkai to Mokuhyō"); Bonus Story 1 "Please Teach Me! Ennoshita Senpai!" (教えて！縁下先輩！, Oshiete! Enshita Senpai!); Bonus Story 2 "Class 1-3's Kageyama-kun" (3組の影山君, 3-Kumi no Kageyama-kun)
9	Desire [Yoku] (「欲」)	January 4, 2014; 978-4-08-870852-2	March 7, 2017; 978-1-4215-9099-8
72. "Let's Go to Tokyo!!" (レッツゴートーキョー！！, "Rettsu Gō Tōkyō!!"); 73. "The Road to Tokyo" (東京遠征への道, "Tōkyō ensei e no Michi"); 74. "Direct Sunlight" (直射日光, "Chokusha Nikkō"); 75. "Villager B" (村人Bー, "Murabito Bｰ"); 76. "Creator" (クリエイター, "Kurieitā"); 77. "Confronting the Champion" (王者と対峙, Ōsha to Taiji); 78. "Let's Go to Tokyo!! For Real!!" (レッツゴートーキョー！！本番！！, "Rettsugōtōkyō!! Honban!!"); 79. "Center Ace" ("センターエース", ""Sentāēsu""); 80. "Desire" (「欲」, "[Yoku]")
10	Moonrise; Tsuki no De (月の出)	April 4, 2014; 978-4-08-880043-1	April 4, 2017; 978-1-4215-9100-1
81. "Room to Grow" (伸びしろ, "Nobi Shiro"); 82. "Rupture" (決裂, "Ketsuretsu"); 83. "Tempo" ("テンポ", ""Tenpo""); 84. "New Evolutions" (それぞれの進化, "Sorezore no Shinka"); 85. "Omnivores" (雑食, "Zasshoku"); 86. "Moonrise" (月の出, "Tsuki no De"); 87. "Ace's Pride" (エースの意地, "Ēsu no Iji"); 88. "Illusionary Hero" (幻覚ヒーロー, "Genkaku Hīrō"); 89. "Reasons" (理由, "Riyū"); Bonus Story "Female Manager" (女子マネージャー, Joshi Manējā)
11	Above "Ue" ("上")	June 4, 2014; 978-4-08-880071-4	May 2, 2017; 978-1-4215-9101-8
90. "Back in Action" (再起動, "Saikidō"); 91. "Vs. the Umbrella" (VS"傘", "VS "Kasa""); 92. "Stillness and Motion" (動と静, "Dō to Sei"); 93. "Gears" (歯車, "Haguruma"); 94. "Unthinking Guidance" (無意識の先導, "Muishiki no Sendō"); 95. "Ace's Form" (「エース」のカタチ, "[Ēsu] no Katachi"); 96. "The Black Team" (黒のチーム, "Kuro no Chīmu"); 97. "Above" ("上", "Ue"); 98. "Conversations" (会話, "Kaiwa")
12	The Tournament Begins! Shiai Kaishi!! (試合開始!!)	August 4, 2014; 978-4-08-880153-7	June 6, 2017; 978-1-4215-9102-5
99. "The Tournament Begins!" (試合開始!!, Shiai Kaishi!!); 100. "Image" (ガッコ, Gakko); 101. "Regrets and Motivation" (後悔と原動力, Kōkai to Gendōryoku); 102. "Pure and Simple Power" (シンプルで純粋な力, Shinpurude Junsuina Chikara); 103. "Ground War" (地上戦, Chijō-Sen); 104. "Baby Bird" (幼鳥, Yōchō); 105. "On the Same Field" (同じ土俵, Onaji Dohyō); 106. "Obstacles" (それぞれの壁, Sorezore no Kabe); 107. "Growth Spurt" (育ち盛り, Sodachi-Zakari); Bonus Story "Why is it that Noya-san is so cool, but still isn't popular with girls?" (ノヤッさんはこんなにカッコイイのになぜモテないのか。, Noyassan wa Kon'nani Kakkoī Noni Nazemote Nai Noka?)
13	Playground; Asobiba (アソビバ)	October 3, 2014; 978-4-08-880193-3	July 4, 2017; 978-1-4215-9103-2
108. "The Teams Arrive" (集結, Shūketsu); 109. "Let the Game Begin" (開戦, Kaisen); 110. "The Strength Needed for Freedom" (自由の為の力, Jiyū no Tame No Chikara); 111. "Inexperienced" (未熟, Mijuku); 112. "Playground" (アソビバ, Asobiba); 113. "Playground: Part 2" (アソビバ2, Asobiba 2); 114. "Playground: Part 3" (アソビバ3, Asobiba 3); 115. "Next" (次へ, Tsugi E); 116. "Vs. Wakutani Minami" (Vs. 和久谷南高校, Vs. Wakutani Minami Kōkō); 117. "While Battling the Little Gaint" (小さな巨人戦の途中ですが, Chīsana Kyojin-Sen no Tochū Desu Ga)
14	Quitter's Battle; Konjō-Nashi no Tatakai (根性無しの戦い)	December 27, 2014; 978-4-08-880275-6	August 1, 2017; 978-1-4215-9104-9
118. "Substitute Foundation" (土台代理, Dodai Dairi); 119. "Quitter's Battle" (根性無しの戦い, Konjō-Nashi no Tatakai); 120. "Quitter's Battle: Part 2" (根性無しの戦い2, Konjō-Nashi no Tatakai 2); 121. "Battle with the Little Giant Resumed" (小さな巨人戦再開, Chīsana Kyojin-sen Saikai); 122. "Challenger" (挑戦, Chōsen); 123. "Another Idol" (もう一つの憧れ, Mōhitotsu no Akogare); 124. "Battle's End" (終盤戦, Shūban-Sen); 125. "Those Who Lost" (敗北者達, Haiboku-Sha-Tachi); Bonus Story 1 "Nisekyū!!" (ニセキュー!!, Nisekyū!!); Bonus Story 2 "V-ball Cards!! The Road to Greatness!" (バボカ！！最強への道！！, Baboka!! Saikyō e no Michi!!)
15	Destroyer; Kowashiya (壊し屋)	March 4, 2015; 978-4-08-880316-6	September 5, 2017; 978-1-4215-9105-6
126. "The Third Panel" ("3枚目", "3-Mai-Me"); 127. "Golden Child" (金の赤子, Kin No Akago); 128. "The Wall Will be Rebuilt" (鉄壁は何度でも築かれる, Teppeki Wa Nando demo Kizukareru); 129. "The New Karasuno" (新生・烏野, Shinsei Karasuno); 130. "Overcome" (払拭, Fusshoku); 131. "Aoba johsai's Gears" (青葉城西の歯車, Aoba Jōsai No Haguruma); 132. "Destroyer" (壊し屋, Kowashiya); 133. "Setter Battle: Round 2" (セッター対決, Round 2 Settā Taiketsu Round 2); 134. "Both Teams" (話お互様, Hanashi O Tagai-Sama); 135. "Slow Starter" (スロースターター, Surōsutātā); Bonus Story "Director Ennoshita" (縁下監督, Ennoshita Kantoku)
16	Ex-Quitter's Battle; Moto Konjō-Nashi No Tatakai (元・根性無しの戦い)	May 1, 2015; 978-4-08-880353-1	October 3, 2017; 978-1-4215-9106-3
136. "Momentum Swing: Part 3" (流れを変える一本・3, Nagare o Kaeru Ippon 3); 137. "Ex-Quitter's Battle" (元・根性無しの戦い, Moto Konjō-Nashi No Tatakai); 138. "Serving: The Ultimate Attack" (サーブという究極の攻撃, Sābu To Iu Kyūkyoku No Kōgeki); 139. "Archnemesis" (宿敵, Shukuteki); 140. "Hoodlums" (輩, Yakara); 141. "Team" ("チーム", "Chīmu"); 142. "Types of Strength" (強さのかたち, Tsuyosa No Katachi); 143. "Light" (灯, Akari); 144. "In the Zone" (極限スイッチ, Kyokugen Suitchi); Bonus Story "Oikawa Hanger" (おいかわハンガー, Oikawa hangā)
17	Talent and Instinct; Sainō To Sensu (才能とセンス)	August 4, 2015; 978-4-08-880447-7	November 7, 2017; 978-1-4215-9107-0
145. "In the Zone: Part 2" (極限スイッチ2, Kyokugen Suitchi 2); 146. "Talent and Instinct" (才能とセンス, Sainō To Sensu); 147. "Head-On Challenge" (真っ向勝負, Makkō Shōbu); 148. "Declaration of War" (宣戦布告, Sensen Fukoku); 149. "Encounters Trigger Chemical Reactions" (出会いの化学変化, Deai No Kagaku Henka); 150. "Greetings" (ごあいさつ, Go Aisatsu); 151. "First-Time Finalists" (決勝初心者, Kesshō Shoshinsha); 152. "Fear the SouthPaw" ("左"の脅威, "Hidari" No Kyōi); 153. "Third Hit" (3本目, 3-Pon-Me); Bonus Story "The Fight Is Not Over" (戦いは終わらない, Tatakai Wa Owaranai)
18	Hope Is a Waxing Moon; Kibō (幾望)	October 3, 2015; 978-4-08-880484-2	December 5, 2017; 978-1-4215-9108-7
154. "Fistfight" (殴り合い, Naguriai); 155. "The Road to the Final Boss" ("ラスボス"への道, "Rasubosu" E No Michi); 156. "Guess Monster" (Guess·Monster, Gesu Monsutā); 157. "Logic and Power" (理性と力, Risei To Chikara); 158. "Backup" (助太刀, Sukedachi); 159. "Links" (一環, Ikkan); 160. "Vigilance" (眈眈, Tantan); 161. "Catalyst" (刺激, Shigeki); 162. "Hope Is a Waxing Moon" (幾望, Kibō); Bonus Story "The Eve of a Full Moon" (幾望, Kibō)
19	Moon's Halo; Tsuki no Wa (月の輪)	December 4, 2015; 978-4-08-880484-2	January 2, 2018; 978-1-4215-9109-4
163. "Moon's Halo" (月の輪, Tsuki no Wa); 164. "Just a Point" (たかが1点, Takaga 1-ten); 165. "Consistency" (一貫, Ikkan); 166. "Guardian and Moonlight" (守護神と月明かり, Shugoshin to tsukiakari); 167. "One vs. Many" (個VS数, Ko vs. Kazu); 168. "Not a Miracle" (Notミラクル, Not Mirakuru); 169. "Man-Made Wings" (義翼, Giyoku); 170. "Identity" (アイデンティティ, Aidentiti); 171. "Everyone's a Competitor" (どいつもこいつも負けずぎらい, Doitsu mo Koitsu mo Makezugirai); "Team Catchphrase Grand Prix Results"; Bonus Story "I totally forgot" ("ど忘れした", "Do Wasure Shita")
20	Particular; Kodawari (こだわり)	March 4, 2016; 978-4-08-880626-6	February 6, 2018; 978-1-4215-9607-5
172. "A Battle of Stamina" (スタミナ勝負, Sutamina Shōbu); 173. "Precipitous Cliff" (断崖絶壁, Dangaizeppeki); 174. "A Battle of Tenths of a Second" (0.数秒の戦い, Zero komma Sūbyō no Tatakai); 175. "Always new" (常に新しく, Tsune ni Atarashiku); 176. "Fresh" (新鮮, Shinsen); 177. "Unpleasant Barrier" (不快な壁, Fukai na Kabe); 178. "Particular" (こだわり, Kodawari); 179. "Detestable Man" (嫌な男, Iya na Otoko); 180. "Particular: Part 2" (こだわり・2, Kodawari・2); Bonus Story 1 Hissatsu Waza (必殺技); Bonus Story 2 Hiruyasumi no Sen (昼休みの戦)
21	A Battle Of Concepts; Konseputo no tatakai (コンセプトの戦い)	May 2, 2016; 978-4-08-908263-8	March 6, 2018; 978-1-4215-9608-2
181. "Fistfight: Part 2" (殴り合い第2ラウンド, Naguriai dai 2-raundo); 182. "A Message Conveyed" (おくることば, Okuru kotoba); 183. "The Person We've Yearned For" (欲しがった男, Hoshi gatta otoko); 184. "I've Never Had This Feeling Before" (はじめての感情, Hajimete no kanjō); 185. "Move, My Legs" (頑張れ俺の太腿, Ganbare ore no futomomo); 186. "Volleyball Fanatic" (バレー馬鹿たち, Barē baka-tachi); 187. "The Daytime Moon" (昼の月, Hiru no tsuki); 188. "A Battle Of Concepts" (コンセプトの戦い, Konseputo no tatakai); 189. "Declaration of War: Part 2" (宣戦布告・2, Sensen Fukoku 2); 190. "The Next Battle" (次の戦い, Tsugi no Tatakai); Bonus Story
22	Land vs. Air; Riku VS Sora (陸VS空)	July 4, 2016; 978-4-08-880744-7	April 3, 2018; 978-1-4215-9609-9
191. "Cats vs. Owls" (ネコVSフクロウ, Neko VS Fukurō); 192. "Engine" (エンジン, Enjin); 193. "Self-proclaimed Ace" ("自称" エース, "Jishō" Ēsu); 194. "Encirclement" (包囲網 Hōi-mō); 195. "Land vs. Air" (陸VS空, Riku VS Sora); 196. "Do or Die" (背水の陣, Haisui no jin); 197. "Snakes vs. Cats" (蛇VS猫, Hebi VS Neko); 198. "Outrageous" (理不尽, Rifujin); 199. "Shaken" (動揺, Dōyō); Bonus Story 1 Karasuno Kōkō Taiiku Matsuri (烏野高校体育祭); Bonus Story 2
23	The Ball's Path; Bōru no "Michi" (ボールの"道")	October 4, 2016; 978-4-08-880790-4	May 1, 2018; 978-1-4215-9610-5
200. "The Willpower of the Seniors" (パイセンの意地, Paisen no iji); 201. "Wing It!" (ぶっつけ本番, Buttsuke Honban); 202. "Nekoma's Ace" (音駒のエース, Nekoma no Ēsu); 203. "The Wind Rises" (風をつくる, Kaze o Tsukuru); 204. "Volleyball That Even Idiots Understand" (バカでも解ったバレーボール, Baka demo Wakatta Barēbōru); 205. "The Ball's Path" (ボールの"道", Bōru no "Michi"); 206. "Report" (報告, Hōkoku); 207. "Preparation" (準備, Junbi); Bonus Story 1; Bonus Story 2
24	First Snow; Hatsuyuki (初雪)	December 2, 2016; 978-4-08-880821-5	June 5, 2018; 978-1-4215-9611-2
208. "First Snow" (初雪, Hatsuyuki); 209. "Self-Introduction" (自己紹介, Jiko Shōkai); 210. "We've Yet To Reach The Starting Point" (スタート地点未到達, Sutāto chiten mi tōtatsu); 211. "Lost Child" (迷子, Maigo); 212. "Vantage Point" (視点, Shiten); 213. "Ball Boy Lv.1" (ボール拾いLv.1, Bōru Hiroi Lv.1); 214. "Monsters" (妖怪たち, Yōkai-tachi); 215. "Sound" (音, Oto); 216. "Lost Child 2" (迷子・2, Maigo 2)
25	Return of the King; Henkan (返還)	March 3, 2017; 978-4-08-881019-5	July 3, 2018; 978-1-4215-9807-9
217. "Lax" (楽, Raku); 218. "Till The Very End" (最後まで, Saigo made); 219. "Hunger" (空腹, Kūfuku); 220. "Joining of Forces" (合流, Gōryū); 221. "The Wall, Once More" (壁、再び, Kabe, futatabi); 222. "Exaltation" (昂揚, Kōyō); 223. "Harsh" (刺刺, Togetoge); 224. "Return of the King" (返還, Henkan); Bonus Story Chinmoku no Kōto (沈黙のコート)
26	Battle Lines; Sensen (戦線)	May 2, 2017; 978-4-08-881071-3	August 7, 2018; 978-1-4215-9817-8
225. "Awkward" (ぎくしゃく, Gikushaku); 226. "Taking Advantage of Confusion" (まぎれる, Magireru); 227. "Challenger" (チャレンジャー, Charenjā); 228. "Transformation" (変化, Henka); 229. "The Other Day" (前日, Zenjitsu); 230. "Their Respective Nights" (それぞれの夜, Sorezore no Yoru); 231. "Beginnings and Happenings" (開幕とハプニング, Kaimaku to Hapuningu); 232. "Battle Lines" (戦線, Sensen); 233. "The First Opponent" (最初の敵, Saisho no Teki)
27	An Opportunity Accepted; Tsunagareru Chansu (繋がれるチャンス)	August 4, 2017; 978-4-08-881194-9	September 4, 2018; 978-1-9747-0041-7
234. "Adjust" (アジャスト, Ajasuto); 235. "Release" (解放, Kaihō); 236. "Adjust 2" (アジャスト・2, Ajasuto 2); 237. "Growth Period" (成長期, Seichō-ki); 238. "Attack and Defense" (攻防, Kōbō); 239. "Ally" (味方, Mikata); 240. "Baptism" (洗礼, Senrei); 241. "The Chance That Was Left To Us" (託されたチャンス, Takusareta Chansu); 242. "An Opportunity Accepted" (繋がれるチャンス, Tsunagareru Chansu)
28	Day 2; 2-ka-me (2日目)	October 4, 2017; 978-4-08-881213-7	October 2, 2018; 978-1-9747-0105-6
243. "Their Respective First Matches" (それぞれの初戦, Sorezore no Shosen); 244. "Weakness Number 6" (弱点その6, Jakuten Sono 6); 245. "Striking" (鮮烈, Senretsu); 246. "Night" (夜, Yoru); 247. "Day 2" (2日目, 2-ka-me); 248. "Disparity" (格差, Kakusa); 249. "Cacophony and Silence" (喧噪と静寂, Kensō to Seijaku); 250. "Challengers" (挑戦者, Chōsen-sha); 251. "Rhythm" (リズム, Rizumu)
29	Found; Mitsukeru (見つける)	December 4, 2017; 978-4-08-881286-1	November 6, 2018; 978-1-9747-0220-6
252. "Back Shield" (後ろ盾, Ushirodate); 253. "Critical Hit" (追い打ち, Oiuchi); 254. "Oddballs, Demons, Evil Spirits of Rivers and Mountains" (変人・妖怪・魑魅魍魎, Henjin・Yōkai・Chimimōryō); 255. "Found" (見つける, Mitsukeru); 256. "Moonlit Dusk" (月夕, Gesseki); 257. "Just and Proper" (正当, Seitō); 258. "EXP Points" (経験値, Keiken-chi); 259. "Push it Push it BAM BAM" (押せ押せドンドン, Ose Ose Don Don); 260. "Desperation" (必死, Hisshi); Bonus Story Karasu no Ie (烏の家)
30	Broken Heart; Shitsuren (失恋)	February 2, 2018; 978-4-08-881337-0	January 1, 2019; 978-1-9747-0258-9
261. "The Means to Jump" (飛び道具, Tobidōgu); 262. "Always Facing Forward" (いつだって前のめり, Itsu Datte Maenomeri); 263. "An Upperclassman's Willpower" (パイセンの意地, Paisen no Iji); 264. "Broken Heart" (失恋, Shitsuren); 265. "Meanwhile, the Lethargic Cats..." (一方その頃不活発猫は, Ippō Sonokoro Fu Kappatsu Neko wa); 266. "Cats vs Monkeys" (ネコ VS サル, Neko VS Saru); 267. "Trap" (罠, Wana); 268. "Kozume Kenma's Theory of Willpower" (孤爪研磨の根性論, Kozume Kenma no Konjō-ron); 269. "The Beasts" (けものたち, Kemono-tachi)
31	Hero; Hīrō (ヒーロー)	April 4, 2018; 978-4-08-881378-3	March 5, 2019; 978-1-9747-0395-1
270. "Instrumental Trio Ensemble" (三重奏, Sanjūsō); 271. "Main Battery" (主砲, Shuhō); 272. "The Strongest Challengers" (最強の挑戦者, Saikyō no Chōsen-sha)); 273. "Flow" (流れ, Nagare); 274. "Captain" (頭, Kashira); 275. "Persistence and Accumulation" (継続と蓄積, Keizoku to Chikuseki); 276. "This is War" (仕掛ける, Shikakeru); 277. "Outnumbered" (多勢に無勢, Tazei ni Buzei); 278. "Hero of the Guardian Deity" (守護神のヒーロー, Shugoshin no Hīrō)
32	Pitons; Hāken (ハーケン)	July 4, 2018; 978-4-08-881511-4	May 7, 2019; 978-1-9747-0505-4
279. "Love" (愛, Ai); 280. "Concept" (コンセプト, Konseputo); 281. "Pitons" (ハーケン, Hāken); 282. "Rice" (メシ, Meshi); 283. "Creed" (信条, Shinjō); 284. "Connect" (ツナグ, Tsunagu); 285. "Birth of the Quiet King" (静かなる王の誕生, Shizukanaru ō no tanjō); 286. "Threat(Trust)" (脅迫, Shinrai); 287. "Anti-Miracle" (アンチ奇跡, Anchi Kiseki)
33	Monsters' Ball; Bakemon-tachi no Utage (バケモンたちの宴)	August 3, 2018; 978-4-08-881538-1	July 2, 2019; 978-1-9747-0743-0
288. "Infectious Voracity" (空腹の伝染, Kūfuku no Densen); 289. "Lax 2" (楽·2, Raku 2); 290. "Monsters' Ball" (バケモンたちの宴, Bakemon-tachi no Utage); 291. "The Day of Change" (変化の日, Henka no Hi); 292. "A night, once passed, never comes back" (いつの夜も二度と無い, Itsu no Yoru mo Nidoto Naii); 293. "The Promised Place" (約束の地, Yakusoku no Ji); 294. "Battle at the Trash Heap" (ゴミ捨て場の決戦, Gomi Suteba no Kessen); 295. "Demon Crow" (化け烏, Bake Karasu); 296. "Synchronized Advancement" (同時進行, Tōji Shinkō); Bonus Story 1 "Rest Day" (休突日, Kyūtotsubi); Bonus Story 2 "Commemorative Photo" (記念撮影, Kinen Satsuei)
34	Cats' Claws; Neko no Tsume (猫の爪)	October 4, 2018; 978-4-08-881589-3	September 3, 2019; 978-1-9747-0780-5
297. "Teacher and Student" (師弟, Shitei); 298. "Guide" (導, Shirube); 299. "Order and Chaos" (秩序與無秩序, Chitsujo Ataemu Chitsujo); 300. "Thrill" (わくわく, Waku Waku); 301. "Little by Little" (じわじわ, Jiwa Jiwa); 302. "Cats' Claws" (猫の爪, Neko no Tsume); 303. "Dislike" (嫌い, Kirai); 304. "The Way to Score" (点のとりかた, Ten no Torikata); 305. "One Step Forward, Two Steps Dash" (1步進んで2步ダツシュ, Ippo Susunde Niho Dasshu); Special: "Haikyū!! x Let's Haikyū!? Collaboration" (「ハイキュー‼︎」x「れっつ! ハイキュー⁉︎, Haikyū‼ x Rettsu! Haikyū⁉)
35	Birdcage; Torikago (鳥籠)	December 4, 2018; 978-4-08-881647-0	November 5, 2019; 978-1-9747-0945-8
306. "Take Aim" (照準, Shōjun); 307. "Tenacity" (粘り, Nebari); 308. "Needle and Broadsword" (針と大剣, Hari to Daiken); 309. "Inducing" (誘発, Yūhatsu); 310. "Birdcage" (鳥籠, Torikago); 311. "The Sorrow of the End" (おしまいの悲しみ, Oshimai no Kanashimi); 312. "Take Aim 2" (照準2, Shōjun 2); 313. "To 'Never Give Up' Is Easier Said Than Done" (「諦めない」って口で言う程簡単な事じゃない, "Akiramenai" tte Kuchide Iu Hodo Kantan'na Koto Janai); 314. "The Greatest Teammate 2" (最強の味方 2, Saikyō no Mikata 2); Special: "Second Grade Elementary Students" (Japanese: 小学2年生 Shōgaku Ni Nensei)
36	I Win; Ore no Kachi (おれの勝ち)	February 4, 2019; 978-4-08-881717-0	January 7, 2020; 978-1-9747-1072-0
315. "Attack" (こうげき, Kōgeki); 316. "Rivals 2" (ライバル 2, Raibaru 2); 317. "Update" (更新, Appudēto); 318. "Partner" (相棒, Aibō); 319. "Guardians" (ガーディアンス, Gādiansu); 320. "Teacher and Student 2" (師弟2, Shitei 2); 321. "Battle Between Beasts" (禽獣角逐, Kinjū Kakuchiku); 322. "Victory" (勝ち, Kachi)
37	The Party's Over; Matsuri no Owari (祭の終わり)	April 4, 2019; 978-4-08-881793-4	March 3, 2020; 978-1-9747-1169-7
323. "Last Battle" (ラストバトル, Rasuto Batoru); 324. "The Party's Over" (祭の終わり, Matsuri no Owari); 325. "The Promise of the Trash Heap" (ゴミ捨て場の約束, Gomisuteba no Yakusoku); 326. "Afternoon" (午後, Gogo); 327. "Volleyball Bugs" (バレーの虫たち, Barē no Mushitachi); 328. "A Battle We Can't Afford to Lose" (負けられない戦い, Make Rarenai Tadakai); 329. National Top Three Aces" (全国三大エース, Zenkoku Sandai Ēsu); 330. "The Fate of an Ace" (エースのさだめ, Ēsu no Sadame); 331. "The Ace's Awakening" (エースのめざめ, Ēsu no Mezame)
38	Task Focus; Tasuku Fōkasu (タスクフォーカス)	June 4, 2019; 978-4-08-881863-4	May 5, 2020; 978-1-9747-1257-1
332. "Star" (スター, Sutā); 333. "Task Focus" (タスクフォーカス, Tasuku Fōkasu); 334. "Through Rock Bottom" (ネガティヴ限界突破, Negativu Genkai Toppa); 335. "Completely Absorbed" (夢中, Muchū); 336. "Where Monsters Go" (バケモノたちの行くところ, Bakemono-tachi no Yuku Tokoro); 337. "Next" (次, Tsugi); 338. "The Game to Crown the New Little Giant" (小さな巨人決定戦, Chīsana Kyojin Kettei-sen); 339. "Acknowledgement" (認知, Ninchi); 340. "Flickering Flames of Rivalry" (メラメラ, Meramera)
39	Little Giants; Chīsana Kyojin (小さな巨人)	September 4, 2019; 978-4-08-882053-8	July 7, 2020; 978-1-9747-1527-5
341. "Vines" (蔓, Kazura); 342. "Logic" (理性, Risei); 343. "Little Giants" (小さな巨人, Chīsana Kyojin); 344. "Milestones" (一里塚, Ichiridzuka); 345. "Cut to the Quick" (犇犇, Hishihishi); 346. "Expectations" (思惑, Omowaku); 347. "Holes" (風穴, Kazaana); 348. "Cracking the Strategy" (攻略の攻略, Kōryaku no Kōryaku); 349. "Scraping By" (低(てい)空(くう)飛(ひ)行(こう), Teikū Hikō)
40	Affirmation; Kōtei (肯定)	November 1, 2019; 978-4-08-882104-7	September 1, 2020; 978-1-9747-1730-9
350. "Freedom and Confinement" (自由(じゆう)と不自由(ふじゆう), Jiyū to Fujiyū); 351. "Nimble" (身軽(みがる), Migaru); 352. "Affirmation" (肯定, Kōtei); 353. "A Quiet Awakening" (静かな覚醒, Shizukana Kakusei); 354. "Give Your All for Your Teammates" (仲間のためにがんばろ, Nakama no Tameni Ganbaro); 355. "Retry" (再挑戦, Sai Chōsen); 356. "Mental Stamina" (思考体力, Shikō Tairyoku); 357. "Guide: Part 2" (導(しるべ) 2, Shirube 2)
41	The Little Giant Vs.… Chīsana Kyojin Vs. (小さな巨人 Vs)	January 4, 2020; 978-4-08-882177-1	November 3, 2020; 978-1-9747-1812-2
358. "Seagulls" (カモメ, Kamome); 359. "The Spear Among Shields, the Shield Among the Spears" (盾(たて)の中(なか)の矛(ほこ), 矛(ほこ)の中(なか)の盾(たて), Tate no Naka no Hoko, Hoko no Naka no Tate); 360. "Teachings" (教(おし)え, Oshie); 361. "The View From the Top: Part 2" (頂( いただき)の景色(けしき)・2, Itadaki no Keshiki 2); 362. "The Little Giant Vs.…" (小(ちい)さな巨人(きょじん) Vs(バーサス)., Chīsana Kyojin Vs.); 363. "The Little Giant Vs. the Greatest Decoy" (小(ちい)さな巨人(きょじん) Vs(バーサス). 最強(さいきょう)の囮(おとり), Chīsana Kyojin Vs. Saikyō no Otori); 364. "If I Wasn't Alone..." (独(ひと)りではないのなら, Hitoride wa Nai Nonara); 365. "Endings and Beginnings: Part 2" (終(お)わりと始(はじ)まり・2, Owari to Hajimari 2)
42	Becoming; Nanimono (なにもの)	March 4, 2020; 978-4-08-882228-0	January 5, 2021; 978-1-9747-1975-4
366. "Watch" (みつめる, Mitsumeru); 367. "Our Spring Comes to an End" (俺たちの春が終わる, Ore-tachi no Haru ga Owaru); 368. "Becoming" (なにもの, Nanimono); 369. "Food Becomes Muscle" (飯(めし)と筋肉(きんにく), Meshi to Kinniku); 370. "Challenger" (挑戦者(ちょうせんしゃ), Chōsen-sha); 371. "On the Other Side of the World" (地球(ちきゅう)の裏側(うらがわ)で, Chikyū no Uragawa de); 372. "Another Challenger" (もう1人(ひとり)の挑戦者(ちょうせんしゃ), Mou Hitori no Chōsen-sha); 373. "Declaration of War: Part 2" (宣戦布告(せんせんふこく)・2, Sensen Fukoku 2); 374. "First Goals" (初(しょ)志(し), Shoshi)
43	The Final Boss; Rasubosu (ラスボス)	May 13, 2020; 978-4-08-882283-9	March 2, 2021; 978-1-9747-2098-9
375. "Polish" (磨(みが)く, Migaku); 376. "Beach Volleyball" (ビーチバレーボール, Bīchibarēbōru); 377. "Going Home!" (帰国(きこく)!, Kikoku!); 378. "The Final Boss" (ラスボス, Rasu Bosu); 379. "The Great Monster War" (妖怪大戦争, Yōkai Daisensō); 380. "Greetings: Part 2" (ごあいさつ 2, Go Aisatsu 2); 381. "Friend and Foe in the Same Boat" (呉越同舟, Goetsudōshū); 382. "Monsters on Parade" (百鬼夜行, Hyakki Yagyō); 383. ""Superstar" (スーパースター, Sūpāsutā); 384. "The Greatest Decoy: Part 2" (最強の囮 2, Saikyō no Otori 2)
44	The Greatest Opponent; Saikyō no Teki (最強の敵)	August 4, 2020; 978-4-08-882348-5	May 4, 2021; 978-1-9747-2283-9
385. "It Got Me Pumped but at the Same Time Made Me Jealous" (テンションが上がると同時に悔しさも感かんじます, Tenshon ga Agaru to Dōjini Kuyashisa mo Kanjimasu); 386. "Freedom" (自由, Jiyū); 387. "The Greatest Opponent" (最強(さいきょう)の敵(てき), Saikyō no Teki); 388. "The Greatest Opponent: Part 2" (最強(さいきょう)の敵(てき)・2, Saikyō no Teki); 389. "King of the Court: Part 2" (コート上(じょう)の王様(おうさま) ・2, Kōto-jō no Ōsama 2); 390. "The Greatest Contender: Part 2" (最強(さいきょう)の挑戦者(ちょうせんしゃ)・2, Saikyō no Chōsen-sha 2); 391. "Who Needs Memories" (思(おも)い出(で)なんか, Omoide Nanka); 392. "Just a Star" (ただのスター, Tada no Sutā); 393. "Beat You to 'Being Better'" (一番乗(いちばんの)りの男(おとこ), Ichiban Nori no Otoko)
45	Challengers; Chōsensha-tachi (挑戦者たち)	November 4, 2020; 978-4-08-882471-0	August 3, 2021; 978-1-9747-2364-5
394. "The Lucky Ones" (幸運(こううん)な我(われ)ら, Kōun na Warera); 395. "The Lucky Ones: Part 2" (幸運(こううん)な我(われ)ら・2, Kōun na Warera 2); 396. "Hunger: Part 2" (空腹(くうふく)・2, Kūfuku 2); 397. "Load Save" (▷ つづきからはじめる, ▷ Tsudzuki Kara Hajimeru); 398. "He Who Would Climb a Ladder Must Begin at the Bottom" (遠(とお)きに行(い)くは必(かなら)ず邇(ちか)きよりす, Tōki ni Iku wa Kanarazu Chikaki Yorisu); 399. "Embodiment" (化身(けしん), Keshin); 400. "The Great Monster War" (妖怪(ようかい)大戦争(だいせんそう)・2, Yōkai Daisensō 2); 401. "Promises" (約束(やくそく), Yakusoku); 402. "Challengers" (挑戦者(ちょうせんしゃ)たち, Chōsensha-tachi)
