= Magical Sisters LuluttoLilly =

Japanese anime television series

- Key visual
- 魔法の姉妹ルルットリリィ
- Genre: Magical girl
- Created by: Studio Pierrot; Bandai Namco Filmworks
- Screenplay by: Yūko Kakihara
- Directed by: Shintarō Dōge
- Music by: ha-j
- Country of origin: Japan
- Original language: Japanese
- No. of episodes: 20

Production
- Animator: Studio Pierrot
- Production company: LuluttoLilly Production Committee (Note: Consisting of various companies.)

Original release
- Network: Tokyo MX, ABC TV, TVA, BS NTV, AT-X
- Release: April 5, 2026 – present

Magical Sisters LuluttoLilly (Japanese: 魔法の姉妹ルルットリリィ, Hepburn: Mahō no Shimai Rurutto Riryi) is a Japanese magical girl anime television series produced by Studio Pierrot. The sixth overall installment of the Pierrot Magical Girl Series, it is also the first released in two decades since Fancy Lala, the Magic Stage. It is directed by Shintarō Dōge, who also provides the original character designs and written by Yūko Kakihara. It airs in two split cours on Tokyo MX and other networks, with first cour airing from April to June 2026, and the second cour premiered in October of the same year.

== Plot ==
Fuu and Rui Nonoyama are sisters who were once on terms with one another but have drifted apart. Suddenly, they are given magical powers, allowing them to transform into magical girl idols. However, there is a catch: these powers only last for a year and they cannot tell anyone that magic exists. While neither Fuu nor Rui knows one another are magical girls, they soon begin their careers as idols.

== Characters ==
Fuu Nonoyama (野々山風, Nonoyama Fū) / CompatoLilly (こんぺとリリィ, Konpeto Riryi)
Voiced by: May Tachibana
A girl in elementary school who often gets excited, cheery. She is the younger sister of Rui. Using the magic wand StattoNeoneon (スタットネオネオン) and the magic locket GlassHeart HopePact (ガラスのハートほうぷパクト), she transforms into Lilly. Her favorite toy is a hippopotamus-like plush doll named Kabappy (かばっピー, Kabappī).
Rui Nonoyama (野々山流, Nonoyama Rui) / MashuLulu (ましゅールル, Mashū Ruru)
Voiced by: Nao Ojika
A girl in middle-school who can be earnest and well put together, but reserved, with some irresponsible or silly behavior at times. After being hospitalized while attending elementary school, she stopped singing. She is Fuu's older sister. Using the magic wand MoontoNeoneon (ムーントネオネオン) and the magic locket GlassHeart DreamPact (ガラスのハートどりむパクト), she transforms into Lulu.
Uguisu (うぐいす)
Voiced by: Hiroki Nanami
A creature from the Felix Star realm of magic as a free spirit, but sometimes grumbles, complains, and speaks a lot.
Azuki (あずき)
Voiced by: Ai Kayano
Also from Felix Star, this creature is usually calm and can overcome troublesome situations due to its charm.
Toko Kandachi (神立塔子, Kandachi Tōko)
Voiced by: Fūka Izumi
The founder of her own idol agency named Production Once More, and an idol herself, who scouts Fuu, in her magical girl idol form, aiming to have her debut.
Sena Aozono (青園せな, Aozono Sena)
Voiced by: Fū Hirohara
In the same idol unit as Tōko, her classmate, and is beginning her idol career.
Asahi Araki (新木あさひ, Araki Asahi)
Voiced by: Miyari Nemoto
A young girl who uses social media –under screennames like nyanko_nyanko222 and 03bonbon (03ぼんぼん)– to cheer on both CompatoLilly and MashuLulu and follow their livestreams. Later applies to join Production Once More as its fifth idol, and designs the idol costumes for everyone.
Meeter (ミーター, Mītā)
Voiced by: Hikaru Yaotome
Also from Felix Star, he pilots a magic ship and was spending a brief vacation on Earth together with Azuki and Uguisu when Fuu sees his ship and tries to chase it.
Shota Seo (瀬尾翔太, Seo Shōta)
Voiced by: Kōhei Amasaki
A boy who attends the same middle school as Rui, and also a longtime childhood friend of Fuu. He becomes a fan of CompatoLilly.
Hisashi Kadoya (角谷久士, Kadoya Hisashi)
Voiced by: Tatsumaru Tachibana
A boy who is close friends with Shota and also attends the same middle school as Rui. He also becomes fascinated by CompatoLilly.
Yasuo Kandachi (神立矢須王, Kandachi Yasuo)
Voiced by: Tomokazu Sugita
Toko's uncle, who helps run Production Once More.
Keiichi Nonoyama (野々山桂一, Nonoyama Keiichi)
Voiced by: Jun Kasama
The father of Fuu and Rui, he runs a confectionery named Fuuryu Japanese Sweets Shop.
Shio Nonoyama (野々山 汐, Nonoyama Shio)
Voiced by: Megumi Ōhara
The mother of Fuu and Rui.
Mari Hinoura (日の浦茉莉, Hinoura Mari) / Marian (マリアン)
Voiced by: Aya Endō
A friend of Shio who runs a cafeteria named Dubdub Coffee (located on the building next to Production Once More's) which is frequented by visitors from Felix Star, who call her Marian.
Songstress (歌姫, Utahime)
Voiced by: Takako Ōta
An unnamed woman who was singing during Fuu's dream in episode 1. Her likeness pays homage to Creamy Mami, the Magic Angel (Studio Pierrot's first entry in its Magical Girl Series franchise), who was also voiced by Takako Ōta.
Bernard Kento (バーナードけんと, Bānādo Kento)
Voiced by: Yū Mizushima
A presenter who hosts television shows like Happiness Music and Quiz! Surfing Treasure.
Lin Wataya (綿屋凛, Wataya Rin)
Voiced by: Ayaka Ōhashi
A senior idol signed to a different talent agency, and a co-host of Quiz! Surfing Treasure.
Pyopyon Ponpolon Nyololond the 6th (ピヨピヨン・ポンポローヌ・ニョロロンド・6世, Piyopiyon Ponporōnu Nyororondo 6-sei)
Voiced by: Yū Mizushima
A mysterious gentleman who lives in Felix Star, he gives Fuu/Lilly further magic lessons after being caught drinking tea at her house garden. Often nicknamed by Oleans as the "Smoke Gentleman" (煙の紳士, Kemuri no Shinshi).
Oleans (オリンズ, Orinzu)
Voiced by: Yūya Hirose
A resident of Felix Star who one day asks Lulu for directions to Dubdub Coffee.
Mucchi (ムッチ, Mutchi)
Voiced by: Yusuke Shirai
Head of the Felix Star Magical Festival's executive committee.
Shiromofu (シロモフ)
Voiced by: Yūko Natsuyoshi
A furball-like Felix Star resident.
Umezo (ウメゾウ, Umezō)
Voiced by: Hirofumi Nojima
A turtle-like Felix Star resident who uses magical transformation devices hidden in the human world to change into a human-like figure.
Tachibana (立花)
Voiced by: Shōgo Yano
A young actor who plays the role of a headmaster's son in a school suspense drama also featuring Lilly and Lin Wataya.
Fisherman (漁師, Ryōshi)
Voiced by: Kenji Hamada
A resident of an underwater magical land, he uses magic to fish.
Chappy (チャピ, Chapi)
Voiced by: Miho Okasaki
Another resident of an underwater magical land, and daughter of the fisherman.
Kabappy Fairy (かばっピーの妖精, Kabappī no Yōsei)
Voiced by: Miina Tominaga
A fairy living on a strange island. Basically, she is a winged live version of Fuu/Lilly's favorite plush Kabappy.

== Media ==
=== Anime ===
The series airs in two split cours on Tokyo MX and other networks, with the first cour airing from April 5 to June 21, 2026, and the second cour premiering on October 4 of the same year. Illit performed the series's opening theme song "Bubee" for the anime's first cour, and "Swingin' Magic" for the second cour, while the idol unit LuluttoLilly, consisting of the series's main characters CompatoLilly (voiced by May Tachibana) and MashuLulu (voiced by Nao Ojika) performed the ending theme song "Calling" for the first cour and "Dream a la Mode" for the second cour. Outside of Asia, the anime can also be seen internationally via Bandai Namco Filmworks' channel on YouTube. In addition, on May 9, Tubi began streaming the series with English subtitles in North America.

==== Episodes ====
No.	Title	Directed by	Written by	Storyboarded by	Chief animation directed by	Original release date
1	"THE DAY I CAUGHT A STAR"; Transliteration: "Sora o tsukanda hi" (Japanese: 星をつかんだ日)	Yukina Ikuta	Yūko Kakihara	Shintarō Dōge	Asami Sodeyama; Kazuhiro Fukuchi; Kumiko Tokunaga; Tatsuo Yamada	April 5, 2026
Unable to get her sister or her friend to play with her before the summer break approaches, Fuu Nonoyama encounters what looks like a spaceship, even though no other humans are able to see it. Trying to catch up with it, she is magically transported into it before she almost dies in a falling accident. Once inside, Felix Star traveler Meeter grants her the ability to use magic for one year – under the condition that she must keep it a secret from everyone, including her own family...
2	"NICE TO MEET YOU, I'M LILLY!"; Transliteration: "Hajimemashite Riryi desu!" (Japanese: はじめましてリリィです！)	Yasuo Tsuchiya	Yūko Kakihara	Yūichirō Yano	Kazuhiro Fukuchi; Sanae Satō; Tatsuo Yamada	April 12, 2026
Fuu ventures into the city along with magical cat Uguisu. Covertly transforming into her magical girl form while shopping for a grownup dress, she enjoys various treats and games until she catches the eye of aspiring idol Toko Kandachi, who tries to recruit her into her own agency Production Once More's idol roster. On her debut during the event Shibu-Yeahhh Teens Meeting, Fuu –now under the stage name CompatoLilly– dazzles an ever-growing audience with a singing performance augmented with her own magical tricks...
3	"GAZING UP AT THE MOON"; Transliteration: "Tsuki o miagetara" (Japanese: 月をみあげたら)	Madoka Izutsu; Hayato Date	Yūko Kakihara	Yūichirō Yano	Sanae Satō; Asami Sodeyama	April 19, 2026
After watching CompatoLilly's debut performance online, Rui Nonoyama wishes she could sing again like she used to during her early childhood. After Azuki reveals to her (who didn't expect a cat to talk) that she can use magic (under the same secrecy conditions), Rui tries to cast magic spells using scant knowledge she read from library books, to no avail. Then, after returning home, she again attempts magic and this time succeeds in transforming into a magical girl, to her own surprise...
4	"LULU PAYS A VISIT"; Transliteration: "Ai ni kita Ruru" (Japanese: 会いにきたルル)	Yasumi Mikamoto	Yūko Kakihara	Masatoyo Takada	Hirono Nishiki; Kazuhiro Fukuchi; Sanae Satō; Kumiko Tokunaga; Asami Sodeyama	April 26, 2026
Rui, in her magical girl form, had gone to Production Once More, asking to join in as a new idol like CompatoLilly; Toko secured her a live TV spot –under the stage name MashuLulu– for the following week, but only after promising some reluctant TV executives a Lilly appearance for the week after. Fuu watches Lulu's debut performance on TV, completely unaware of her true identity (in spite of noting that she sang like Rui). Shortly after running an errand to bring some sweets to her mother's friend Mari at Dubdub Coffee, Fuu/Lilly receives a text message from Toko, asking her to meet up with Lulu...
5	"WELCOME TO HELL'S QUIZ"; Transliteration: "Jigoku no kuizu e yōkoso" (Japanese: 地獄のクイズへようこそ)	Mitsuyuki Masuhara	Azusa Serikawa; Yūko Kakihara	Mitsuyuki Masuhara	Sanae Satō; Kumiko Tokunaga; Asami Sodeyama; Junghye Yoon	May 3, 2026
The idols from Production Once More –Toko, Sena, Lulu, and Lilly– are participating on a live televised quiz show, Quiz! Surfing Treasure (hosted by Bernard Kento and Lin Wataya), where the participant with the highest score wins a treasure prize. Lilly, after winning several rounds by reason of finding easy answers for most questions, feels bored and secretly uses her magic wand to try to inject more fun and excitement into the quiz – only for the magic to backfire and turn the show into Hell's Quiz, where repeated failures could land participants into hot, burning lava...
6	"SUMMER MEANS A TRAINING CAMP!"; Transliteration: "Natsu to ieba, gasshuku deshō" (Japanese: 夏といえば、合宿でしょ)	Ichizō Kobayashi	Yasuhiro Nakanishi	Ai Ikegaya	Kazuhiro Fukuchi; Hiroshi Numata; Kumiko Tokunaga; REGRIM	May 10, 2026
Toko proposes a training camp to her fellow Once More idols. While back home Rui asks Azuki for help on coming up with an excuse for her trip, Fuu invokes her StattoNeoneon, asking it to let her "go to the training camp somehow"; magically, the next morning Fuu and Rui's parents are asked by Mari to help her out at a booth far west and won't be back home until the next day, thus giving both girls –still oblivious of each other's magic– the perfect excuse to attend the training camp, which takes place at a private beach with a house, which unbeknownst to the idols is inhabited by a strange, teddy-bear-like figure...
7	"SUMMER DAYDREAM"; Transliteration: "Samā Deidorīmu" (Japanese: サマーデイドリーム)	Ai Ikegaya	Yasuhiro Nakanishi	Atena Okada; Ai Ikegaya	Sanae Satō; Kazuhiro Fukuchi	May 17, 2026
The Once More idols are trapped inside a haunted house overrun by possessed plush dolls. Toko's uncle Yasuo, concerned about losing communications with his niece, rides a taxi towards the house, but the taxi itself ends up stuck into an infinite loop, never reaching its destination. Lilly, upon seeing Lulu's struggle through what appears to be a magic mirror, uses her magic to help Lulu escape the house; Lulu herself then invokes her MoontoNeoneon, asking it to give her courage to save her friends...
8	"AUTUMN WINDS AND STRAW HATS"; Transliteration: "Akikaze to mugiwara bōshi" (Japanese: 秋風と麦わら帽子)	Rika Mashiko	Yuka Miyata	Ichizō Kobayashi	Kazuhiro Fukuchi; REGRIM	May 24, 2026
Summer break is over, and Fuu forgot to do her summer homework or even study for the school test scheduled for the first day of classes. After declining an invitation from Toko for a TV appearance scheduled for the same day as the test, she uses the StattoNeoneon to cancel all tests; the resulting magic does not just do that, it also cancels all classes not just on her school but also on Rui's. Feeling that something is off at school and that it might be caused by someone else's magic, Rui uses her MoontoNeoneon to undo such magic and bring things back to normal. Thus ensues a back-and-forth between magic spells cast by both sisters, who are still unaware of each others' powers...
9	"A GLOOMY SATURDAY"; Transliteration: "Sukkiri shinai doyōbi" (Japanese: すっきりしない土曜日)	Hidenori Hanesaka	Yūko Kakihara	Tomohiko Itō	Sanae Satō; Kazuhiro Fukuchi	May 31, 2026
Lulu and Lilly make TV pre-recordings, one after the other, where they are interviewed and also sing their hit songs. Then on a Saturday at home, Fuu catches Rui watching Lilly's song performance, which is now being broadcast on TV; excited that her big sis is a Lilly fan, Fuu then asks Rui to sing, only for Rui to decline, claiming she won't become as good as Lilly. With their emotions fully changed, and after Fuu averting an almost reveal of her secret identity, both retire to sleep. The next day, both girls, again transformed into their magical selves, decide to take a leisurely day off and individually cast magic to make their day better, only for them to unexpectedly cross paths together...
10	"INVITED TO FELIX STAR"; Transliteration: "Manekarete, Ferikkusu Sutā e" (Japanese: 招かれて、フェリックススターへ)	Madoka Izutsu	Misuzu Chiba	Hiroshi Tsuzuki; TaЯo)))	Sanae Satō; Kazuhiro Fukuchi; REGRIM	June 7, 2026
Fuu catches a mysterious gentleman having a tea at her house garden, who reveals himself to be a Felix Star resident and a user of magic. He accepts Fuu's request to become his magic apprentice, and both travel to Felix Star through a magic portal. Meanwhile, Lulu is asked by a strange being on the street for directions to Dubdub Coffee, which seems to be receiving visitors from Felix Star, including Meeter himself! After practicing some magic lessons, Fuu/Lilly enters Magic Mountain, but then stumbles and falls through the bushes into an unknown place full of magic monsters – an incident witnessed by Mari through Dubdub's basement TV screen...
11	"CINDERELLA WITH A CURFEW"; Transliteration: "Mongen ari no Shinderera" (Japanese: 門限ありのシンデレラ)	Ichizō Kobayashi	Yasuhiro Nakanishi	Mitsuyuki Masuhara	Sanae Satō; Kazuhiro Fukuchi; Asami Sodeyama	June 14, 2026
Fuu and Rui are questioned by their parents about their late home arrivals, and a curfew is imposed on both sisters by their mom. This still doesn't stop Lilly and Lulu from preparing for their first-ever live concert as LuluttoLilly, by leaving school just as soon as the bell tolls and leaving work as fast as possible to arrive back home at exactly six o'clock evening. However, Lulu, exerting too much effort on her dance and singing exercises within the constraints of her curfew, collapses during practice. Worried about both Lulu and (coincidentally) Rui's fever, Fuu/Lilly quietly leaves home during the night and uses her magic to help Rui/Lulu rest easy without worrying about school/work...
12	"LET'S SING, LULUTTOLILLY"; Transliteration: "Utaō RuruttoRiryi" (Japanese: 歌おうルルットリリィ)	Yukina Ikuta	Yūko Kakihara	Chiaki Kon	Asami Sodeyama; Kazuhiro Fukuchi; Sanae Satō; REGRIM	June 21, 2026
Fuu and Rui wake up very early, then individually leave the house, with Fuu taking somewhat longer to get ready than Rui and thus missing the train (which Rui took far ahead) to the venue at Zeppo City where LuluttoLilly would hold their very first live concert. After transforming into CompatoLilly and MashuLulu, they disguise themselves among the lines of fans walking towards the venue, albeit Shota and Hisashi eventually do recognize Lulu, who quietly thanks them for their support. After singing their individual songs on stage, Lulu secretly uses her magic to transform a cart into a magic boat from which they sing their brand-new duet song. The next morning, both girls again wake up very early and decide to take a stroll outdoors together...
13	"SECRET MESSAGE"; Transliteration: "Himitsu no messēji" (Japanese: 秘密のメッセージ)	Masashi Omura	Misuzu Chiba	Moe Kato	Sanae Satō	October 4, 2026
While citizens of Felix Star are building the venue for the upcoming Magical Festival, Rui, watching with Fuu a broadcast of LuluttoLilly's Zeppo City concert, wonders if her sister can use magic or whether she is secretly Lilly; thus, Rui starts stalking Fuu wherever she goes, to see if she indeed uses magic, leading Azuki to alarm Uguisu about the possibility of Rui having figured out Fuu's secret. Meanwhile, a new girl, Asahi Araki, wants to join Production Once More, but gets nervous when Lilly meets her at the office. Lulu, wanting to learn the secret of that old song Fuu/Lilly were humming, uses magic just outside the office door, but instead it turns the Zeppo concert's disc recording (which the Once More girls were about to watch) into a holographic experience that amazes Asahi, who later also gets nervous upon being met by Lulu after the latter joins late...
14	"MAGICAL SONGSTRESS"; Transliteration: "Mahō no utahime" (Japanese: 魔法の歌姫)	Hinano Nono	Yūko Kakihara	Ichizō Kobayashi	Sanae Satō	October 11, 2026
After receiving a sample of Fuuryu's new spring sweet from her friend Shio, Dubdub Coffee's Mari is inquired by her alien customers about that girl (Lulu) they had met before while discussing whom to hire as the Magical Festival's songstress. Rui/Lulu, still insistent on figuring out whether Fuu is Lilly, uses a crystal ball to try to crack the mystery, but instead the ball projects onto her mirror a view of Felix Star... only to be interrupted by Fuu's call for dinner, forcing her to detransform from Lulu back into Rui. The next day, Asahi is formally introduced via livestream as the new Once More member. Rui, returning to her mirror and crystal ball, watches Oleans –that alien she once guided to Dubdub– go to a library inside the castle-like Felix Tower and inquire with the Festival's executive committee head (Mucchi) about a certain magical idol he thinks could be the ideal candidate for songstress...
15	"THE MANY FACES OF RUI"; Transliteration: "Rui no shichihenge" (Japanese: 流の七変化)	Rika Mashiko; Miki Sugiyama	Kanon	Atena Okada	Sanae Satō	October 18, 2026
After hearing Mucchi's ominous words about a magical idol's fate if her secret identity were exposed, Rui stops investigating Fuu/Lilly and instead focuses on an upcoming gig. After school, Shota asks Rui whether she would like to see him play basketball... only to see he was talking to a stranger! Turns out a nearby tree –in reality a magic device planted there by a turtle-like being (Umezo) to change him into a humanoid– was mistakenly left active and had transformed Rui into a middle-aged man while Shota's eyes were looking elsewhere. After becoming Rui again, she transforms into Lulu and enters a tunnel, unknowingly passing by Umezo who again leaves another transformation device (a set of tunnel lights) active, which turns her into a boy before she arrives at the gig location! While texting Toko an excuse for her absence, a nearby tree –yet another transformation device– changes her into a girl with eyeglasses (who assumes the name of Nonoko) before a passing lady sees her and thinks she is Lulu's stand-in for the gig, a school-suspense drama featuring Lin Wataya, Tachibana, and Lilly as the antagonist!
16	"SURPRISE GOURMET BATTLE"; Transliteration: "Gurume batoru wa totsuzen ni" (Japanese: グルメバトルは突然に)	Yukina Ikuta	Yuka Miyata	Yukina Ikuta	REGRIM; Asami Sodeyama	October 25, 2026
Lilly repeatedly loses to Asahi in playing cards. When organizers of the upcoming Shinshu Music Fes ask Production Once More to bring LuluttoLilly to their festival, Toko instead proposes to follow up the idol duo with a new, five-member band (with CompatoLilly and MashuLulu as double centers); Yasuo plans to hire a songwriter to compose a new song for the new quintet to perform at the Fes. The next day, Lilly and Lulu are invited to do a cooking livestream sponsored by the makers of Umapon, a ponzu sauce planned to be sold at the Fes; they are asked to cook a dish using Umapon and featuring a big crab bought online by Toko, who is operating the stream camera. However, because of a magic spell secretly cast by Lilly (and thus prone to backfiring) before the stream started, the crab –shortly after she put it whole into a boiling hot pot– comes to life, grows into a giant size, and unleashes vengeance upon the live kitchen!
17	"STARS ARE BORN! MORE: ONCE MORE!"; Transliteration: "Tanjō! Moa: Wansu Moa" (Japanese: 誕生！もあ・わんすもあ)	Hisae Takei	Misuzu Chiba	Chiaki Kon	Sanae Satō; REGRIM; Asami Sodeyama	November 1, 2026
The new idol quintet, given by Toko the name "More: Once More", takes a train to Karuizawa, where Shinshu Highland Park –the venue for the Shinshu Music Fes– is located. Before the concert, the five girls decide to take a stroll around the town's stores and food places (which are mostly closed, save for a few found by Asahi). Long Serenade, a trio of musicians also planned to perform at the Fes, volunteers to take a picture of the Once More quintet at a faceless photo booth, later admitting that they too are fans of LuluttoLilly. While fans (including Shota and Hisashi) are gathering with tents at the Highland Park's Ringo Field (where the Fes will be held, with Bernard Kento serving as MC), the girls are walking among nearby woods, until Yasuo interrupts them by phone call, alerting them that the Fes is about to begin. When the girls (now wearing outfits designed by Asahi) are about to start singing at the concert, a magic star-shooting device operated by Oleans malfunctions...
18	"STORM ON THE STRANGE ISLAND"; Transliteration: "Fushigi-na shima no arashi" (Japanese: ふしぎな島の嵐)	Riku Matsuo	Yūko Kakihara	Yūichirō Yano	—	November 8, 2026
The Once More quintet is out on vacation over the sea, riding a fast boat driven by Yasuo towards an island lodge, until a magic storm traps them. When the girls (along with Azuki and Uguisu) wake up, they find themselves on a mysterious island, with no sight of Yasuo or the boat (and no cellular signal either). Calling for help to no avail, they go survival mode, splitting into three groups: Toko and Asahi collect berries (unaware of their side effects later on) while Lulu and Sena go fishing. Meanwhile, Lilly (accompanied by Uguisu, later joined by Azuki) tries to use magic, but it fails; something on the island is preventing magic from working (something Lulu also finds out separately). Then, Lilly encounters a fisherman and his daughter Chappy (residents from a magic underwater land), who tell her that the island is sinking due to an approaching storm...
19	"THE START OF A FRIENDSHIP"; Transliteration: "Tomodachi no hajimari" (Japanese: 友達のはじまり)	Hidenori Hanesaka	Chisato Yoko'o	Ichizō Kobayashi	Sanae Satō; REGRIM; Asami Sodeyama	November 15, 2026
During a rainy day, Toko and Sena reminisce on how they first became full friends two years ago, back when both were starting high school. During this flashback, one day during recess, Toko asked Sena to join her in becoming idols, a dream she had been holding on to (in spite of her own mother's objections); but Sena turned down the offer. That didn't stop Toko from repeatedly trying to convince Sena, however, up to the point of barging into the other girl's homeroom to hand her an "Idol Project" notebook, which she eventually read before giving it back to Toko (and again declining the idol offer). Nevertheless, Toko kept on with her dream, even enlisting her uncle to scout for possible locations on where to establish an office for what, two years later, would become Production Once More... Back to the present, with Asahi having to study for a school test and Toko stepping out for a phone call, with no rehearsal to be had, Lilly decides to bring Lulu to a cute ice cream truck which, in spite of being very close to Once More, they could not usually visit before during rehearsal days because it closed before they were done rehearsing...
20	"LILLY QUITS BEING AN IDOL?!"; Transliteration: "Riryi, aidoru intai!?" (Japanese: リリィ、アイドル引退⁉)	TBA	TBA	TBA	TBA	November 22, 2026
