= Pierrot Magical Girl Series =

Japanese anime series

- Collage of the promotional images of the first five TV series in the Pierrot Magical Girl Series
- Created by: Studio Pierrot
- Owner: Studio Pierrot
- Years: 1983–present

Films and television
- Television series: See below

The Pierrot Magical Girl Series (ぴえろ魔法少女シリーズ, Piero Mahō Shōjo Shīrizu) is a series of Japanese magical girl anime series by Studio Pierrot.

== History ==
Before Studio Pierrot started making magical girl anime, Magical Princess Minky Momo (also known as Gigi outside Japan), animated by the studio Ashi Productions and produced in cooperation with Yomiko Advertising, gained popularity. Afterwards, Yomiko Advertising approached Studio Pierrot to create a new majokko (魔女っ子; lit. 'little witch') anime, which would become Magical Angel Creamy Mami. In the 1980s, three other series would follow Creamy Mami.

Within Studio Pierrot, the name magical girl (魔法少女, mahō shōjo) would be used, although majokko would also be sometimes used.

Minky Momo and Creamy Mami together started what would later be called the "Second Magical Girl Boom" (第2期魔法少女ブーム, Dainiki Mahō Shōjo Būmu).

After a 12-year gap, Fancy Lala aired on TV Tokyo in 1998, but would not become a big hit, unlike its predecessors.

In April 2026, Magical Sisters LuluttoLilly, the sixth installment in the series, aired on Tokyo MX after a 28-year gap.

== Common characteristics ==
There are many common characteristics in the series (with some exceptions):

- The protagonist is an elementary school girl.
- The protagonist is a normal girl but receives magical powers from a being from another world.
- The protagonist is close to a slightly older male character whom she has a crush on.
- The protagonist is accompanied by a familiar from another world, who helps her out.
- The protagonist transforms into an older girl by casting a spell with her magic wand. An exception being Pastel Yumi, who possesses almost no transformation ability except for very briefly changing her costume, so she barely ends up using said ability.
- A new singer voices the protagonist and performs the theme song, except in Persia. Additionally, Fancy Lala's voice actress, Reiko Ōmori, was already active before the series.
- The protagonist's household runs a business, e.g. a crêpe stall, except for Fancy Lala.

== Series overview ==
No.	Title	Series director	Run	Episodes	Network	Ref(s)
1	Magical Angel Creamy Mami	Osamu Kobayashi	July 1, 1983 – June 29, 1984	52	Nippon Television	
2	Persia, the Magic Fairy	Takashi Anno	July 6, 1984 – May 31, 1985	48	Nippon Television	
3	Magical Emi, the Magic Star	Takashi Anno	June 7, 1985 – February 28, 1986	38	Nippon Television	
4	Pastel Yumi, the Magic Idol	Akira Shigino	March 7 – August 29, 1986	25	Nippon Television	
5	Fancy Lala, the Magic Stage	Takahiro Omori	April 5 – September 27, 1998	26	TV Tokyo	
6	Magical Sisters LuluttoLilly	Shintarō Dōge	April 5, 2026 – present	–	Tokyo MX (Japan); YouTube (Worldwide) (Note: Via Bandai Namco Filmworks' official YouTube channel.)	
