= East Fish Studio =

Japanese animation studio

East Fish Studio Inc.
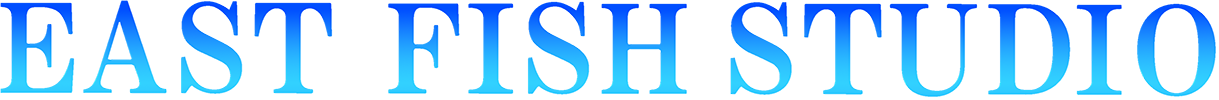
- Native name: 株式会社イーストフィッシュスタジオ
- Romanized name: Kabushiki-gaisha Īsuto Fisshu Sutajio
- Type: Kabushiki-gaisha
- Industry: Japanese animation
- Founded: June 1, 2017; 9 years ago
- Headquarters: Hatagaya, Shibuya, Tokyo, Japan
- Key people: Ryū Suzumori (CEO)
- Total equity: ¥10,000,000
- Number of employees: 54
- Website: eastfish.co.jp

East Fish Studio Inc. (Japanese: 株式会社イーストフィッシュスタジオ, Hepburn: Kabushiki-gaisha Īsuto Fisshu Sutajio) is a Japanese animation studio based in Shibuya, Tokyo. It was founded on June 1, 2017, by former OLM production assistant Ryū Suzumori.

== Works ==
=== Television series ===
Title	Director(s)	First run start date	First run end date	Eps	Note(s)	Ref(s)
A Condition Called Love	Tomoe Makino	April 4, 2024	June 20, 2024	12	Based on a manga by Megumi Morino.	
Tōhai	Jun Hatori	October 5, 2024	April 5, 2025	25	Based on a manga by Kōji Shinasaka.	
The Daily Life of a Middle-Aged Online Shopper in Another World	Yoshihide Yuuzumi	January 9, 2025	April 3, 2025	13	Based on a light novel by Hifumi Asakura.	
In the Clear Moonlit Dusk	Yūsuke Maruyama	January 11, 2026	March 29, 2026	12	Based on a manga by Mika Yamamori. Co-produced with Atelier Peuplier.	
Kaya-chan Isn't Scary	Hiroshi Ikehata	January 11, 2026	March 29, 2026	12	Based on a manga by Tarō Yuri.	
Tetsuryō! Meet with Tetsudō Musume	Misuzu Hoshino	October 9, 2026	TBA	TBA	Original work, related to the Tetsudō Musume franchise by Tomytec.	
The Strongest Man, Born from Misfortune	Shigetaka Ikeda	2027	TBA	TBA	Based on a light novel by Fukufuku.	

=== Original video animations ===
Title	Director(s)	Release date	Runtime	Note(s)	Ref(s)
Fragtime	Takuya Satō	November 22, 2019	60 minutes	Based on a manga by Sato. Co-produced with Tear Studio.	
Mirage Queen Prefers Circus	Saori Den	June 17, 2022	60 minutes	Based on a novel series by Kaoru Hayamine.	

=== Films ===
Title	Director(s)	Release date	Runtime	Note(s)	Ref(s)
Ten Count	So Toyama	Cancelled		Based on a manga by Rihito Takarai. Co-produced with SynergySP. Set for a 2023 release, but cancelled due to production issues.	
Kaitō Queen no Yūga na Kyūka	Shigetaka Ikeda	May 23, 2025	88 minutes	Sequel to Mirage Queen Prefers Circus.	
