= Fancy Lala =

1998 Japanese magical girl series

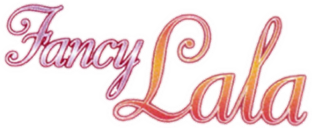

魔法のステージ・ファンシーララ (Mahō no Sutēji Fanshī Rara)
- Genre: Magical girl
- Anime television series
- Directed by: Takahiro Omori
- Produced by: Junji Ashida; Reiko Fukakusa; Shin'ichi Ikeda; Kazuhiko Ikeguchi
- Written by: Ken'ichi Araki; Tomomi Mochizuki; Sadayuki Murai; Masashi Yokoyama
- Music by: Michiru Ōshima
- Studio: Studio Pierrot
- Licensed by: NA: Bandai Entertainment
- Original network: TXN (TV Osaka)
- Original run: 5 April 1998 – 27 September 1998
- Episodes: 26
- Manga
- Written by: Rurika Kasuga
- Published by: Shueisha
- Magazine: Ribon
- Original run: May 1998 – November 1998
- Volumes: 2

Fancy Lala, known in Japan as Fancy Lala, the Magic Stage (魔法のステージ・ファンシーララ, Mahō no Sutēji Fanshī Rara), is a magical girl anime series produced by Studio Pierrot in 1998, following an OVA released in 1988. It is the 5th overall installment in the Pierrot Magical Girl Series. It is directed by Motosuke Takahashi and written by Kenji Terada. It aired on TV Osaka from April 5, 1998, to September 27, 1998.

A two-volume manga adaptation by Rurika Kasuga ran in Ribon. The original designs were created by Akemi Takada, who worked on many of the Studio Pierrot series of the 1980s.

== Plot ==
One day, a nine-year-old elementary schoolgirl named Miho Shinohara is given two stuffed dinosaurs by an unnamed stranger. The stuffed dinosaurs come to life and they present her with a magic sketchbook and pen. Within limits, and subject to varying degrees of control, she can draw in the sketchbook and bring the drawings to life. Miho can also transform into a teenage girl, Fancy Lala. She is scouted by Yumi Haneishi, the president of the talent agency Lyrical Productions, and begins the long road to stardom.

== Characters ==
=== Main cast ===
Miho Shinohara (篠原 みほ, Shinohara Miho) /Fancy Lala (ファンシーララ, Fanshī Rara)
Voiced by: Reiko Ōmori (Japanese); Katie Rowan (English)
Miho is nine-year-old elementary school girl who dreams of becoming a manga artist someday. After Mystery Man gives her Pog and Mog, they also give her a magical pen and sketchbook, which allow her to transform into the body of a fifteen-year-old girl under the name of Fancy Lala. She is scouted by Yumi Haneishi of Lyrical Productions and slowly follows the path to stardom, but neither her parents nor sister knows about this.
Mog (モグ, Mogu)
Voiced by: Michiko Neya (Japanese); Chris Simms (English)
Mog is a small pink dinosaur who accompanies Miho Shinohara.
Pig (ピグ, Pigu)
Voiced by: Shinobu Adachi (Japanese); Maureen Jones (English)
Pig is a male small blue dinosaur who accompanies Miho Shinohara.
Mystery Man (不思議さん, Fushigi-san)
Voiced by: Ryūsuke Ōbayashi (Japanese); Byron Close (English)
A mysterious person who gave Miho Shinohara Pog and Mog and often advises Miho/Fancy Lala.
Hiroya Aikawa (相川 ひろや, Aikawa Hiroya)
Voiced by: Hideo Ishikawa (Japanese); Victor Atelevich (English)
Hiroya is an attractive popular idol who is Miho Shinohara's love interest, and Fancy Lala's mentor at Lyrical Productions.
Yumi Haneishi (羽根石 由美, Haneishi Yumi)
Voiced by: Atsuko Tanaka (Japanese); Onalea Gilbertson (English)
The president of Lyrical Productions who represents Fancy Lala, she was once married to Kishi, the guitarist of Hiroya Aikawa's band. Before their divorce, the two had a son named Teppei, who attends kindergarten.
Ririka Kawaguchi (川口 理々香, Kawaguchi Ririka)
Voiced by: Michiko Neya
Ririka is an employee at Lyrical Productions, and Fancy Lala's manager.
Taro Yoshida (吉田 太郎, Yoshida Taro)
Voiced by: Kappei Yamaguchi (Japanese); Jeffrey Watson (English)
Taro is Miho's classmate and next-door neighbor whom she often fights with but cares about her very much. He is also the cousin of Miki Yumeno. He seems to have a romantic interest in Miho, however he doesn't know that Miho has a crush on Hiroya.
Miki Yumeno (夢野 美樹, Yumeno Miki)
Voiced by: Fumie Kusachi (Japanese); Mariette Sluyter (English)
Miki is a popular idol who is Fancy Lala's main rival. She is also the cousin of Taro Yoshida, Miho's male classmate from school.

=== Supporting cast ===
Katsunoshin Asaka (朝霞 勝之進, Asaka Katsunoshin; Mr. Asaka, 朝霞先生 Asaka-sensei)
Voiced by: Mitsuru Miyamoto (Japanese); Steve Gin (English)
Miho Shinohara's teacher.
Emiko Kanno (菅野 江美子, Kanno Emiko)
Voiced by: Eiko Kanazawa (Japanese); Meredith Taylor-Perry (English)
Emiko is an employee at Lyrical Productions.
Komiyama (コミさん, Komi-san)
Voiced by: Ken Narita (Japanese); Allan Boss (English)
Komiyama is Fancy Lala's stylist. It is hinted in the last episode that he knows more about what is going on than meets the eye.
Anna Nozaki (野崎 あんな, Nozaki Anna)
Voiced by: Mayumi Iizuka (Japanese)
Anna is Miho's classmate.
Chisa Shinohara (篠原 ちさ, Shinohara Chisa)
Voiced by: Mifuyu Hiiragi (Japanese); Carol-Anne Day (English)
Miho's older sister, Chisa is also a freshman in high school.
Mamiko Shinohara (篠原 真実子, Shinohara Mamiko)
Voiced by: Yoshiko Sakakibara (Japanese); Elizabeth Stepkowski (English)
Miho's mother, Mamiko works as a TV producer and is often away from home.
Yoichiro Shinohara (篠原 洋一郎, Shinohara Yoichiro)
Voiced by: Noboru Hoshino (Japanese); David Pettitt (English)
Yochiro is Miho's father who works as a paleontologist and mostly works at home.
Yoshio (ヨシオ)
Voiced by: Yūji Ueda (Japanese); Matthew Erickson (English)
Yoshio is an employee at Lyrical Productions.
Akiru Yuki (結城 あきる, Yuki Akiru)
Voiced by: Omi Minami (Japanese); Taylor Beaven (English)
Akiru is Miho's classmate and closest friend who dreams of becoming an actress.

== Production ==
Fancy Lala is a complete remake of an earlier Studio Pierrot OVA titled Harbor Light Story Fashion Lala Yori. It was also influenced by Creamy Mami, the Magic Angel, the story of a ten-year-old Japanese girl granted the power to transform who also became an idol.

== Episode list ==
Episode #	Title	Transformation outfit	Original airdate
1	"Miho's Spectacular Transformation" ｢みほ、華麗なる変身!｣ (Miho, Karei Naru Henshin)		April 5, 1998
2	"Lala's Debut in Harajuku" ｢ララの原宿デビュー!｣ (Rara no Harajuku Debyū!)		April 12, 1998
3	"The Heart-Pounding TV Appearance!" ｢どきどきテレビ出演!｣ (Dokidoki Terebi Shutsuen)		April 19, 1998
4	"A Double Date on Sunday!" ｢ダブルデートの日曜日｣ (Daburudēto no Nichiyōbi)		April 26, 1998
5	"A Busy Day for Miho and Lala!" ｢みほとララの多忙な一日｣ (Miho to Rara no Tabōna Ichinichi)		May 3, 1998
6	"Lala's a Rival?" ｢ララはライバル?｣ (Rara wa Raibaru?)		May 10, 1998
7	"The Terrifying Care Duty for Mokko" ｢恐怖のモッコ当番｣ (Kyōbu no Mokko Tōban)		May 17, 1998
8	"Kitten Lilu and the Secret of the Magic!" ｢チビ猫リルと魔法のひみつ｣ (Chibi Neko Riru to Mahō no Himitsu)		May 24, 1998
9	"There's No Way I Can Be a Singer!" ｢歌手になんてなれない!｣ (Kashu ni Nante Narenai!)		May 31, 1998
10	"The CD Release Campaign Disaster!" ｢すったもんだのキャンペーン｣ (Suttamonda no Kyampēn)	mermaid suit, fortune tellers outfit	June 7, 1998
11	"The Spectacular Pinch Hitter!" ｢華麗なるピンチヒッター｣ (Karei Naru Pinchihittā)		June 14, 1998
12	"Who Are You?" ｢あなたはだあれ?｣ (Anata wa Daare?)		June 21, 1998
13	"The Lala and Hiroya Scandal!" ｢ララとひろやのスキャンダル｣ (Rara to Hiroya no Sukyandaru)		June 28, 1998
14	"Miho in Toyland!" ｢おもちゃの国のみほ｣ (Omocha no Kuni no Miho)		July 5, 1998
15	"The Dream Will Never End" ｢その夢は終わらない｣ (Sono Yume wa Owaranai)		July 12, 1998
16	"Miho's First Journey Alone!" ｢みほの最初の一人旅｣ (Miho no Saisho no Hitoritabi)		July 19, 1998
17	"The Day the Water Imp Appeared!" ｢カッパが出てきた日｣ (Kappa ga Detekita Hi)		July 26, 1998
18	"Lala is a Cupid!" ｢ララは恋のキューピッド｣ (Rara wa Koi no Kyūpiddo)		August 2, 1998
19	"Something Chisa Left Behind" ｢お姉ちゃんの忘れ物｣ (Onēchan no Wasuremono)		August 9, 1998
20	"Together With Mom?!" ｢お母さんと一緒?!｣ (Okāsan to Issho?!)		August 16, 1998
21	"Mr. Asaka's Girlfriend?!" ｢朝霞先生の恋人?｣ (Asaka Sensei no Koibito?)		August 23, 1998
22	"The Scoop! Lala's Identity Revealed!" ｢スクープ!ララの正体｣ (Sukūpu! Rara no Shōtai)		August 30, 1998
23	"My Sister's Boyfriend" ｢お姉ちゃんのボーイフレンド｣ (Onēchan no Bōifurendo)		September 6, 1998
24	"Lala's First Concert" ｢ララのファーストコンサート｣ (Rara no Fāsuto Konsāto)		September 13, 1998
25	"Lala Has Vanished!" ｢消えてしまったララ｣ (Kieteshimatta Rara)		September 20, 1998
26	"I Love You All!" ｢みんな大好き!｣ (Minna Daisuki!)		September 27, 1998

== International releases ==
Fancy Lala was licensed by Bandai Entertainment for an English release in 2001. Tubi added the series to its streaming platform in July 2017, initially with Japanese audio and English subtitles.
