= Kaitō Queen =

Japanese novel series

- First novel volume cover

怪盗クイーン (Kaitō Kuīn)
- Novel series
- Written by: Kaoru Hayamine
- Illustrated by: K2 Shōkai
- Published by: Kodansha
- Imprint: Aoitori Bunko
- Original run: March 2002 – present
- Volumes: 15
- Original video animation

Mirage Queen Prefers Circus
- Directed by: Saori Den
- Written by: Mariko Kunisawa
- Music by: Moe Hyūga
- Studio: East Fish Studio
- Licensed by: Sentai Filmworks
- Released: June 17, 2022
- Runtime: 60 minutes
- Anime film

Kaitō Queen no Yūga na Kyūka
- Directed by: Shigetaka Ikeda
- Written by: Mariko Kunisawa
- Music by: Moe Hyūga
- Studio: East Fish Studio
- Released: May 23, 2025
- Runtime: 88 minutes

Kaitō Queen (Japanese: 怪盗クイーン, Hepburn: Kaitō Kuīn; 'Mirage Queen') is a Japanese novel series written by Kaoru Hayamine and illustrated by K2 Shōkai. Kodansha have published fifteen volumes since March 2002 under their Aoitori Bunko children's imprint. A theatrical original video animation (OVA) adaptation of the first novel, Kaitō Queen wa Circus ga Osuki, premiered in Japan in June 2022. An anime film adaptation, titled Kaitō Queen no Yūga na Kyūka, premiered in May 2025.

== Plot ==
The Phantom Thief Queen whose gender, age and nationality are not revealed, travels around the world on the airship Troubadour with assistants Joker and the AI called RD, carrying out audacious thefts befitting the character of the Phantom Thief.

== Characters ==
Queen (クイーン, Kuīn)
Voiced by: Yūga Yamato
Joker (ジョーカー, Jōkā)
Voiced by: Kazuki Kato
RD
Voiced by: Yuma Uchida
White Face (ホワイトフェイス, Howaito Feisu)
Voiced by: Toshiyuki Morikawa
Shamon Saitō (シャモン斎藤)
Voiced by: Makoto Furukawa
Silver Cat Hitomi (シルバーキャット瞳, Shirubā Kyatto Hitomi)
Voiced by: Yuri Noguchi
Jean Paul (ジャン・ポール, Jan Pōru)
Voiced by: Hinata Tadokoro
Styli Inoue (スタイリー井上, Sutairī Inoue)
Voiced by: Yusuke Shirai
Beast (ビースト, Bīsuto)
Voiced by: Natsu Yorita
Prism Prism (プリズムプリズム, Purizumu Purizumu)
Voiced by: Hironori Kondō
Joe Sesame (ジョー・セサミ, Jō Sesami)
Voiced by: Hiromichi Tezuka
Rocketman (ロケットマン, Rokettoman)
Voiced by: Shinya Takahashi
Kōtarō Nishitōji (西遠寺 考太郎, Nishitōji Kōtarō)
Voiced by: Yūya Hirose
Mari Itō (伊藤 真里, Itō Mari)
Voiced by: Ayaka Shimizu
Inspector Kamikoshi (伊藤真里, Kamikoshi-keibu)
Voiced by: Jin Urayama
Shintarō Iwashimizu (岩清水 慎太郎, Iwashimizu Shintarō)
Voiced by: Kent Itō
Ilma (イルマ, Iruma)
Voiced by: Cocomi
Satchmo (サッチモ, Satchimo)
Voiced by: Mitsuaki Hoshino

== Media ==
=== Novels ===
No.	Release date	ISBN
1	March 15, 2002	978-4-06-148577-8
2	April 18, 2003	978-4-06-148612-6
3	May 15, 2004	978-4-06-148651-5
4	July 29, 2005	978-4-06-148693-5
5	February 15, 2008	978-4-06-285002-5
6	May 15, 2008	978-4-06-285023-0
7	October 15, 2011	978-4-06-285233-3
8	July 15, 2013	978-4-06-285369-9
9	April 15, 2014	978-4-06-285421-4
10	July 15, 2016	978-4-06-285565-5
11	September 15, 2017	978-4-06-285655-3
12	March 12, 2019	978-4-06-515021-4
13	July 15, 2019	978-4-06-516523-2
14	August 15, 2019	978-4-06-516865-3
15	May 25, 2020	978-4-06-519587-1

=== Original video animation ===
In July 2021, it was announced that the series' first novel, Kaitō Queen wa Circus ga Osuki (怪盗クイーンはサーカスがお好き, Kaitō Kuīn wa Sākasu ga Osuki; "Mirage Queen Aime Cirque"), would be adapted as a theatrical original video animation (OVA). It premiered in Japan on June 17, 2022, and was produced by East Fish Studio and directed by Saori Den, with scripts written by Mariko Kunisawa, character designs by Kumiko Kawashima, and music composed by Moe Hyūga. The film's theme song is "Gyakuten no Regina" by Little Black Dress. Sentai Filmworks has licensed the OVA outside of Asia.

In Kaitō Queen wa Circus ga Osuki, the Queen plans steal the gemstone known as the Rose of Linden from the wealthy businessman Daizo Hoshibishi and return it to Egypt from where stolen years ago and known as Nefertiti's Smile. However the diamond is stolen first by White Face, head of the Seven Ring Circus, who issues a challenge to the Phantom Thief Queen to steal it from him. The Queen succeeds and then offers to help White Face fulfil his wish to take his circus to the war-torn country where he befriended a young girl many years ago.

=== Anime film ===
A new anime adaptation, titled Kaitō Queen no Yūga na Kyūka, was announced on March 12, 2023. It was later revealed to be a film produced again by East Fish Studio and directed by Shigetaka Ikeda, with the rest of the staff and cast reprising their roles. It opened in Japan on May 23, 2025. The film's theme song is "Queen's illusion", performed by Anipani.
