= The Daily Life of a Middle-Aged Online Shopper in Another World =

Japanese light novel series and its adaptations

- First light novel volume cover

アラフォー男の異世界通販生活 (Arafō Otoko no Isekai Tsūhan Seikatsu)
- Genre: Isekai
- Novel series
- Written by: Hifumi Asakura
- Published by: Shōsetsuka ni Narō
- Original run: September 13, 2017 – June 24, 2021
- Light novel
- Written by: Hifumi Asakura
- Illustrated by: Yamakawa
- Published by: SB Creative; Tugikuru Corporation
- Imprint: Tugikuru Books
- Original run: May 10, 2018 – Apr 10, 2019
- Volumes: 3
- Manga
- Written by: Hifumi Asakura
- Illustrated by: Umiharu
- Published by: Square Enix
- English publisher: NA: Comikey; Square Enix
- Imprint: G Fantasy Comics
- Magazine: Monthly GFantasy
- Original run: April 18, 2019 – May 17, 2024
- Volumes: 8
- Anime television series
- Directed by: Yoshihide Yuuzumi
- Written by: Masanao Akahoshi
- Music by: Kujira Yumemi
- Studio: East Fish Studio
- Licensed by: Crunchyroll
- Original network: AT-X, Tokyo MX, BS11, Kansai TV
- English network: SEA: Animax Asia
- Original run: January 9, 2025 – April 3, 2025
- Episodes: 13
- icon

The Daily Life of a Middle-Aged Online Shopper in Another World (Note: Japanese: アラフォー男の異世界通販生活, Hepburn: Arafō (Note: Short for "around 40") Otoko no Isekai Tsūhan Seikatsu) is a Japanese light novel series written by Hifumi Asakura and illustrated by Yamakawa. The series was originally published on the Shōsetsuka ni Narō website, with chapters being uploaded from September 2017 to June 2021. It was later acquired by SB Creative and Tugikuru Corporation who began publishing it under their Tugikuru Books light novel imprint in May 2018. A manga adaptation illustrated by Umiharu was serialized in Square Enix's Monthly GFantasy magazine from April 2019 to May 2024. The manga is licensed in English by Comikey and is also published on Square Enix's Manga Up! Global service. An anime television series adaptation produced by East Fish Studio aired from January to April 2025.

== Plot summary ==
Ken'ichi Hamada, a 38-year-old freelance manga artist working in Tokyo, has become increasingly dissatisfied with his life. After moving back to his country home, he is just beginning to settle into his new lifestyle when he suddenly finds himself displaced into another world by a mysterious god. There, he discovers that he can still connect to Earth's internet and access his favorite online shopping site. He uses this cheat skill to sell and purchase things he needs and earn money to make a living in this new world, developing lots of love interests along the way. But in time, he begins to hear rumors that he may not be the only person from Earth stranded here.

== Characters ==
=== Main characters ===
Ken'ichi Hamada (ハマダ ケンイチ, Hamada Ken'ichi)
Voiced by: Junichi Suwabe (Japanese); Marcus D. Stimac (English)
The main protagonist. Ken'ichi Hamada is a 38-year-old, single manga artist who grew up in a country town. Dissatisfied with his life in the city, he moves back after finding a way to commute. After finding himself abruptly transported into another world by a god, and discovering that he can somehow still shop on the internet, he sells items he finds in the other world and uses the funds gained to procure high-quality modern-day items to sell for a profit, as well as an Item Box that can carry an unlimited amount of objects. With that money, he hopes to set himself up for a quiet life in the countryside; but the more he uses his cheat abilities, the more notoriety he gains. He also gains lots of love interests, who are quite competitive for him.
If forced into combat, Ken'ichi either uses an excavator (any modern vehicles he uses are referred to as a "summoned iron beast" or a "horseless carriage"), a crossbow, a slingshot, a shield, or firecrackers, all of which he keeps stored in his Item Box, as his weapons of choice. He is later given the title and powers of a Holy Knight by Princess Lilith.
Primula (プリムラ, Purimura)
Voiced by: Kaede Hondo (Japanese); Sara Ragsdale (English)
The daughter of Mallow, a wealthy merchant in the town of Dahlia. After her maid ends up buying clothespins and jewelry from Ken'ichi's stall, which arouse her interest, she invites him to her house to ask him to sell them exclusively to her father's company, which Ken'ichi agrees to. She gradually becomes fascinated by his kindness and the exotic wares he has to offer. When she is kidnapped by Shaga's bandits, Ken'ichi goes out to rescue her, winning her affection. After he moves to Astrantia, she follows him on foot to his new home, stubbornly determined to marry him, and later becomes Ken'ichi's wife. She was originally meant to marry North Pole, but turned it down as she still has her sights on Ken'ichi. She is love rivals with Anemone. Owing to her background, she is already well-versed in opening and maintaining a business, thus serving as an intermediary in peddling Ken'ichi's wares in Astrantia.
Anemone (アネモネ)
Voiced by: Misaki Kuno (Japanese); Lara Woodhull (English)
A twelve-year-old girl who was sold to another family by her impoverished parents and then captured by Shaga's bandit gang. After Ken'ichi defeats the band, she decides to stay with him as his adoptive daughter, but also become his future wife once she's old enough. She is later discovered to have an innate talent for magic and begins studying to become a magician. She is good friends with Mary, but also love rivals with Primura.
Myaley (ミャレー, Myarē)
Voiced by: Miyu Tomita (Japanese); Lisette Monique Diaz (English)
A tomboyish female cat beastwoman with black fur and faint stripes, and a skilled archer. She first encounters Ken'ichi when he starts selling wares in Dahlia and becomes interested in Japanese spices. After Ken'ichi moves out of Dahlia in order to escape the local nobility's unwanted attention towards him, Myarey follows him to his new home. She develops feelings for Ken'ichi and has a rivalry with Nyamena.
Nyamena (ニャメナ)
Voiced by: Yū Kobayashi (Japanese); Madeleine Norton (English)
A tiger-furred female cat beastwoman who is hired by Primura as a bodyguard after she sets up shop in Astrantia with wares provided by Ken'ichi. After being invited for dinner and taking a liking to the comforts of Ken'ichi's home, she also joins the household and develops affection for him, much to Myarey's consternation.
Vel (ベル, Beru)
Voiced by: Yurika Kubo (Japanese); Emi Lo (English)
A female forest cat worshipped as divine by the cat beastpeople. After Ken'ichi finds her and treats an injury she sustained, she becomes very attached to him.

=== Dahlia territory ===
Azaela (アザレア, Azarea)
Voiced by: Yurika Kubo (Japanese); Hannah Alyea (English)
An 18-year-old female worker at an inn in Dahlia, and Kenichi's first friend in the new world. In return for teaching him to read and write the local language, and the basics of the local economy, he gifts her with sweets from Earth. She has romantic affection for Ken'ichi and desires to be his lover.
Anama (アナマ)
Voiced by: Hiroko Kiso (Japanese); Kirsty Johnson (English)
A middle-aged female trader from Dahlia who runs a small stall next to Kenichi when he first sets up shop in Dahlia. When Kenichi sets out against Shaga's bandits, she joins his band of volunteers as a cook. Having lost her children to plague, she offers to take Anemone in, which the girl refuses as she wants to stay with Ken'ichi instead.
Nyakero (ニャケロ) , Nyamelo (ニャルメロ) and Nyanji (ニャンジー)
Voiced by: Yuji Murai (Nyakero), Takahiro Sumi (Nyamelo) and Toshinari Fukamachi (Nyanji) (Japanese); Aaron Campbell (Nyakero), Aaron Roberts (Nyamelo) and Aaron Dismuke (Nyanji) (English)
Three male cat beastmen and Myarey's companions who are won over by Kenichi's cooking and join him in his quest against Shaga's bandits. They seem to have feelings for Nyamena.
Mallow (マロウ, Marou)
Voiced by: Yōji Ueda (Japanese); Bill Jenkins (English)
An influential merchant in Dahlia and Primura's father. He also has an Item Box.
Norspaul (ノースポール, Nōsupōru)
Voiced by: Jun Fukuyama (Japanese); Carson Wright (English)
A knight from Dahlia. He patronizes Ken'ichi's stall for fine knives and steel, and later joins him in his expedition against Shaga's bandits. He and Primura were previously meant to be engaged, but the proposal was canceled as Primura wants to marry Ken'ichi instead.
"Old Man" (爺さん, Jīsan)
Voiced by: Kōichi Sōma (Japanese); R. Bruce Elliott (English)
An unnamed old sorcerer and keeper of a magic shop in Dahlia.
Fuyou (フヨウ)
Voiced by: Katsumi Fukuhara (Japanese); Rudy Lopez (English)
A merchant who once gave Ken'ichi a ride to Dahlia. They met each other again on certain occasions.
Shaga (シャガ)
Voiced by: Yūki Sampei (Japanese); Tyson Rinehart (English)
The leader of a feared bandit gang haunting the area around Dahlia. After being paid by a nobleman, his band captures Primura. Kenichi assembles a band of volunteers to rescue her, and Shaga is killed by Myarey after Ken'ichi blinds him with a laser sight.

=== Astrantia territory ===
Croton (クロトン, Kuroton)
Voiced by: Shūhei Matsuda (Japanese); Seth Magill (English)
One of the first people whom Ken'ichi befriends after moving from Dahlia to Astrantia. A former government official, he has made himself enemies who keep tormenting him and his family. After his little daughter Mary becomes ill and Ken'ichi aids him in procuring a rare medicine, they move to take up residence at North Pole's new barony near Dahlia with a letter of recommendation by Ken'ichi.
Canaan du Eupatorium (カナン・デュ・ユーパトリウム, Kanan de~yu Yūpatoriumu)
Voiced by: Yōko Hikasa (Japanese); Elizabeth Evans (English)
The wife of Viscount Eupatorium. She becomes acquainted with Ken'ichi after she assists Primura in her business when the latter gets harassed by the thugs of another merchant. As she vainly tries to seduce Ken'ichi due to her affection for him (even though she already has a husband) and witnesses his life with his extended family, she begins to realize the unhappiness in her own marriage.
Viscount Eupatorium (ガルム・デュ・ユーパトリウム, Garumu de~yu Yūpatoriumu)
Voiced by: Sōsihrō Hori (Japanese); Alfie Loy (English)
A viscount, lord of Astrantia and Canaan's husband.
Snowflake (スノーフレーク, Sunōfurēku)
Voiced by: Mikuru Tōgi (Japanese); Anastasia Muñoz (English)
A female magician and owner of a magical items shop. She knows of Anemone's mother.
Iris (アイリス, Airisu)
Voiced by: Yū Wakui (Japanese); Izzy Raine (English)
The daughter of two local public servants, Iris was facing the prospect of finding herself a job or marrying a much older man. After seeing Primura doing business in her city, she asked to be hired and was taken in as Primura's assistant to help expand the business.
Thogalum (ソガラム, Sogaramu)
Voiced by: Hinata Tadokoro (Japanese); Mark Stoddard (English)
An unscrupulous merchant who is not averse to bullying competitors and overcharging his clients for his personal profit. After having his thugs harass Primura one time too many, Ken'ichi uses his "magic" to intimidate Thogaram into leaving the town.
Mary (マリー, Marī)
Voiced by: Maria Naganawa (Japanese); Kristin Sutton (English)
Croton's daughter. She is good friends with Anemone.
Cineria (サイネリア, Saineria)
Voiced by: Rena Maeda (Japanese); Kara Edwards (English)
Croton's wife and Mary's mother.
Nyanyas (ニャニャス, Nyanyasu)
Voiced by: Chikahiro Kobayashi (Japanese); Aaron Michael (English)
A cat beastperson who usually accompanies Croton.
Dogman
An unnamed dog beastperson who previously worked with some thugs who hated Croton. He has a pack of tamed wolves. Myarey resents his kind.

=== Royal Capital of Kadan ===
Lilith (リリス, Ririsu)
Voiced by: Hina Yōmiya (Japanese); Lindsay Seidel (English)
The spoiled 15-year-old first princess and only heir to the throne of the kingdom of Kadan. Despite her whimsical and egotistic personality, she is also sharp of wit and has her occasional generous moments. After gaining notoriety as a magician, Ken'ichi is called to the royal court to fight a duel with Kadan's court magician for the nobility's amusement. After seeing Ken'ichi's unusual "magic" in action, and after inviting herself to (and enjoying) his dinner cookings, she develops affection towards him and intervenes on his behalf (albeit not unselfishly) by granting him a royal pardon when the duel begins to escalate. When his business in the capital is concluded, she joins his family entourage.
Amaranth (アマランサス, Amaransasu)
Voiced by: Ami Koshimizu (Japanese); Monet Lerner (English)
The Queen of Kadan and Lilith's stepmother. Because her husband dotes on his daughter, she has made herself Lilith's self-declared rival. Having borne no royal heirs (and thus having lost standing with the nobility), and intrigued with Ken'ichi after his performance at court, she spontaneously invites herself to his family group. Like Canaan, she also tries to seduce Ken'ichi due to her also developing affection for him despite already being married.
The King (国王, Kokuō)
Voiced by: Takehiro Hasu (Japanese); Ethan Gallardo (English)
The unnamed meek King of Kadan, who is dominated by his wife, Amaranth.
Mailon (マイレン, Mairen)
Voiced by: Asaka (Japanese); Alex Moore (English)
Princess Lilith's personal maid. She appears to have taken a liking to Ken'ichi.
Melissa Rana Nasturtium (メリッサ・ラナ・ナスタチウム, Merissa Rana Nasutachiumu)
Voiced by: Kana Hanazawa (Japanese); Tia Ballard (English)
The female court wizard of Kadan, and Snowflake's out-of-wedlock daughter with a nobleman. She was separated from her mother right after birth and not allowed to see her again, and grew up just as arrogant as the rest of the country's nobility. Nevertheless, she is on good terms with Ken'ichi's family after losing a match against them, but is eager to fight them again in the future. She knows Anemone's mother.

=== The Empire ===
Akira (アキラ)
Voiced by: Taisuke Nakano (Japanese); Ryan Negrón (English)
Another Japanese who was displaced into the other world by the same mysterious god from the start of the story, more precisely into a region known as the Empire. He established himself as a magician, but only gained the ability to create mayonnaise at will. He became notorious as the Dragon Slayer of the Empire after he killed a dragon by suffocating it with mayonnaise. Tired of the Empire's demands on him, he and Reylan decide to accompany Ken'ichi and his family.
Reylan (レイラン, Reiran)
A beautiful, well-endowed sorceress and Akira's wife.

=== Others ===
Count Asclepius (アスクレピオ伯爵, Asukurepio Hakushaku)
A noble from Dahlia. He is not seen, only mentioned.
Ameria (アメリア)
Anemone's deceased mother, who can use magic just like her. Snowflake and Melissa know her.
Traveling Bard (吟遊詩人, Gin'yūshijin)
Voiced by: Shōko Yuzuki (Japanese); Rowan Gilvie (English)
An unnamed female bard whom Fuyou gives a ride to Dahlia and later to an unknown location. Like Ken'ichi and Mallow, she also has an Item Box.
God
An unidentified deity who resembles a little girl with glowing jade skin and a white dress. She was the one responsible for transporting Ken'ichi and Akira to the other world. It is unknown why though or what her motive is.

== Media ==
=== Light novel ===
Written by Hifumi Asakura, The Daily Life of a Middle-Aged Online Shopper in Another World was originally published on the user-generated novel publishing website Shōsetsuka ni Narō from September 13, 2017, to June 24, 2021. It was later acquired by SB Creative and Tugikuru Corporation who began publishing it under their Tugikuru Books light novel imprint with illustrations by Yamakawa on May 10, 2018. Three volumes have been released as of April 10, 2019.

No.	Release date	ISBN
1	May 10, 2018	978-4-7973-9648-5
2	November 10, 2018	978-4-7973-9955-4
3	April 10, 2019	978-4-8156-0230-7

=== Manga ===
A manga adaptation illustrated by Umiharu was serialized in Square Enix's Monthly GFantasy magazine from April 18, 2019, to May 17, 2024. Its chapters were collected into eight tankōbon volumes released from October 26, 2019, to December 27, 2024.

The manga is licensed in English by Comikey and is also published on Square Enix's Manga Up! Global service.

No.	Release date	ISBN
1	October 26, 2019	978-4-7575-6364-3
2	April 27, 2020	978-4-7575-6631-6
3	November 27, 2020	978-4-7575-6966-9
4	July 27, 2021	978-4-7575-7390-1
5	August 26, 2022	978-4-7575-8098-5
6	April 27, 2023	978-4-7575-8540-9
7	February 27, 2024	978-4-7575-9067-0
8	December 27, 2024	978-4-7575-9590-3

=== Anime ===
An anime television series adaptation was announced on August 17, 2024. it is produced by East Fish Studio and directed by Yoshihide Yuuzumi, with scripts overseen by Masanao Akahoshi, character designs by Hiroyuki Moriguchi, and music composed by Kujira Yumemi. The series aired from January 9 to April 3, 2025, on AT-X and other networks. The opening theme song is "Give & Take", performed by Asaka, and the ending theme song is "Aikurafuto" (あいくらふと; Love Craft), performed by Kiminone. Crunchyroll streams the series.

==== Episodes ====
No.	Title	Directed by (Note: Production staff information is taken from the ending credits of each episode.)	Written by	Storyboarded by	Original release date
1	"An Unfamiliar Forest"; Transliteration: "Mishira nu Shinrin" (Japanese: 見知らぬ森林)	Keiei Yūzumi, Misato Aoyama	Masanao Akahoshi	Yoshihide Yūzumi	January 9, 2025
Ken'ichi Hamada, a 38-year-old manga artist, tired of life and work in the city and moves back to his country home. Just as he is starting to settle in, he is abruptly transferred into a forest in an unknown world, having been transported here by a mysterious spirit. To his surprise, he finds that he can still access his favorite internet shopping site, Shangri-La, and uses the modern conveniences he can purchase from there to overcome his current predicament (such as a bike, cooking equipment, food, and a ladder) after trading in some items from a corpse he finds nearby. He also discovers that he has an Item Box that can be used to store whatever he finds or buys. After feuding off monsters and escaping the forest, he meets a merchant named Fuyou, who takes him to the city of Dahlia. Accompanying him is a bard who also has an Item Box. Reaching the city, Ken'ichi is warned of the Spice Syndicate who resides here. He books a room in an inn, where one of its employees, Azaela, teaches him about the local language and economy. He gifts her sweets and a drawing of herself, whereupon she spends the night with him after developing feelings for him. The next day, Ken'ichi registers at the merchants guild and sets up shop in the marketplace next to another shop run by a merchant named Amana, where his offerings of fine and (for the locals) exotic wares quickly attract attention, including from a cat beastwoman named Myarey, a knight named North Pole, and Primura, the daughter of a wealthy merchant. In a nearby forest, a ragged little girl named Anemone struggles to survive as she flees an unseen pursuer.
2	"Curry is Justice!"; Transliteration: "Karē wa Seigi!" (Japanese: カレーは正義！)	Shigeki Awai	Masanao Akahoshi	Keiji Nakamura, Keiei Yūzumi	January 16, 2025
Ken'ichi sells glass baubles as glass is rare in this world. Myarey and her companions Nyakero, Nyarumelo, and Nyanji ask for spices. He does not have any, but offers to cook for them and invites Amana to join them. After the meal, they camp out, with Myarey, who has also developed feelings for Ken'ichi, sleeping naked on top of him. Azaela becomes jealous when she sees Myarey's hairs on him. Primura invites him to meet her father Mallow and they work out a deal where Ken'ichi will supply Mallow's company with items. Ken'ichi decides to build a house in the forest and uses a chainsaw to clear some trees. He buys a mini-excavator to clear the stumps, but must use lamp oil as a substitute for diesel fuel since Shangri-La does not sell diesel fuel. He buys an insect repelling stone from an old man. Amana tells him to beware the bandit leader Shaga. Meanwhile, Anemone is caught by slavers and transported by wagon along with other female slaves, but the wagon is attacked by Shaga's gang.
3	"A Small House in a Big Forest"; Transliteration: "Dai-shinrin no Chīsana Ie" (Japanese: 大森林の小さな家)	Unknown	Masanao Akahoshi	Keiji Nakamura, Keiei Yūzumi	January 23, 2025
Shaga and his men abuse their captured slaves, including Anemone, then Shaga receives a letter. Ken'ichi buys a log cabin, but it needs to be assembled, so Myarey and her friends help him set it up. Solar panels, fields, and an outdoor bath are also assembled around the cabin. Azaela becomes sad that Ken'ichi will not stay in the inn anymore. He goes bike riding when he is attacked by dog beastmen. He scares them off with a slingshot, fireworks, and his mini-excavator, but finds that they shot a bobcat with an arrow. He treats it with Myarey's help, with Myarey sleeping naked on top of him again. After he dreams of a mysterious woman, the bobcat recovers and is released, so Myarey goes home. Primura visits and is impressed by his bath (which comes with a heater used for drying off), bathrobe, nightgown, and a drawing of herself, spending the night with him. He later sells bathrobes and sleeping wear to Mallow, but learns that some modern inventions were seen in the capital, making him suspect that someone else from the modern world arrived here. Primura spends another night with him and confesses she is in love with him, but he refuses due to their age difference. Despite this, Primura still maintains her feelings for him. North Pole visits and buys some high quality steel from him, then reveals a mage with the power to summon mayonnaise recently killed a dragon, weirding Ken'ichi out.
4	"Adventurers (Kenichi and His Eight Allies)"; Transliteration: "Bōkensha-tachi – Ken'ichi to 8-nin no Nakama -" (Japanese: 冒険者たち-ケンイチと8人の仲間-)	Taiki Nishimura	Masanao Akahoshi	Keiji Nakamura, Keiei Yūzumi	January 30, 2025
A month later, Shaga's gang kidnaps Primura. Mallow begs for help, but only Ken'ichi, the bobcat that Ken'ichi helped earlier, Myarey, Nyakero, Nyarumelo, Nyanji, North Pole, the old man that Ken'ichi met before, and Amana volunteer, with everyone else deriding them as fools since Shaga is a very powerful man. Ken'ichi buys a pickup truck to transport the party and equips them with weapons, amazing them with his "magic". North Pole had used the steel that he bought from Ken'ichi to make a new sword called Wolf Fang. They make camp and Amana helps Ken'ichi cook, then stays behind since she cannot fight. Myarey scouts ahead with a radio while her friends feed Ken'ichi a drug that pumps him up and eliminates his fear. Upon finding the bandit's base, Myarey kills the perimeter guards with arrows while the old man (who can use magic) blasts the gate open with a spell. Everyone, including the bobcat, battles the bandits, with Ken'ichi attacking with his mini-excavator. He inadvertently breaks the cell holding the female slaves open and Anemone thinks he is God. Shaga uses Primura as a shield to force Ken'ichi's group to surrender, but Ken'ichi blinds him with a laser pointer, allowing Myarey to kill him with an arrow. After all the bandits are dead, the freed slaves bathe and Ken'ichi provides clothes and scissors to give Anemone a haircut, though Primura accidentally embarrasses herself when her towel falls off while near Ken'ichi. Anemone finds Shaga's letter which says that a noble hired him to kidnap Primura. Everyone returns to Amana and the camp and sleeps for the night.
5	"The Moon Over an Old Castle"; Transliteration: "Kojō no tsuki" (Japanese: 古城の月)	Yōko Ono	Masanao Akahoshi	Keisuke Warita	February 6, 2025
The group head back to Dahlia on Ken'ichi's pickup truck, Ken'ichi returns Primura to Mallow and some of the freed female slaves who lost their families decide to work for Mallow while Ken'ichi drops the other former slaves off at their homes. Anemone's village is very far away and her family had abandoned her, so she stays with the group. They sell the bandits' treasure, furniture, and weapons, and present their severed heads (having also burned the bodies) to the guild to collect their bounties. Primura suggests to Mallow that they can sell the clothes and scissors that Ken'ichi gave her and the other slaves earlier. Amana decides to raise Anemone. Azaela tries to sleep with Ken'ichi, but Anemone and the bobcat interrupts them, resulting in Ken'ichi spending the night with them instead. Amana finds them and Anemone says she wants to stay with Ken'ichi, so he starts raising her, to which she insists on taking a bath and sleeping with him. A month later, North Pole got the noble who hired Shaga arrested and was promoted to baron. Primura and Mallow invent a draisine based on Ken'ichi's design and made their last name Draisine after being promoted to nobility. Some cloaked figures try to kidnap Ken'ichi and Anemone for a noble, but he fights them off with fireworks and a crossbow and they retreat. Mallow suggests he ask Count Asclepius for help, but he decides to run away instead to avoid making the situation worse. Primura rushes to Ken'ichi's cabin to ask him to marry her, but is heartbroken to find an empty space where the home once was, leaving only the fields. Ken'ichi put all his stuff away in Shangri-La, then with Anemone and the bobcat, rode away on a motorcycle, meeting Fuyou along the way.
6	"The Book Loving..."; Transliteration: "Hon Zuki no..." (Japanese: 本好きの...)	Masanao Akahoshi	Shigeki Awai	Keiji Nakamura, Keiei Yūzumi	February 13, 2025
Ken'ichi, Anemone, and the bobcat, who is named Vel, approach the city of Astrantia. They settle near a lake, and Ken'ichi teaches the girl reading, writing, and math, and gives her a picture book version of The Little Mermaid. Myarey, who wasn't happy that Ken'ichi moved away, finds and starts living with them, reporting that North Pole proposed to Primura. Myarey is impressed by the book, so Ken'ichi decides to use his art skills and special equipment to make picture book versions of local fairy tales, making the girls happy. A human named Croton and a cat beastman named Nyanyas from the village of Santanka investigate him, but decide to trust him after seeing Vel in his company, and Croton buys several picture books for his daughter Mary. Myarey later seduces Ken'ichi. To refine biodiesel fuel, Ken'ichi goes to Astrantia to register with the guild and buys a liquid separator and a grimoire from an old witch named Snowflake. Ken'ichi finds thugs threatening Croton and Mary, so he scares them away with fireworks. Anemone and Mary quickly become friends, and they visit each other every day and help Ken'ichi make more picture books. One day, Mary catches a terrible fever. Ken'ichi provides medicine to slow the fever, but Snowflake says the only cure is seeds from a certain flower in the woods. Ken'ichi, Croton, and Nyanyas go look for it, but the thugs gloat that they found Croton's house and will have their revenge on Croton for previously arresting them.
7	"Creep Forth!"; Transliteration: "Hai Yore!" (Japanese: 這いよれ！)	Taiki Nishimura	Masanao Akahoshi	Masaki Ōzora	February 20, 2025
Vel follows Ken'ichi, Croton, and Nyanyas as they find the flower with the help of an inflatable boat, but they are attacked by wolves controlled by a dogman working with the thugs. Ken'ichi and Vel help Croton and Nyanyas escape with the flower, then a giant bear injures the dogman and scares away the wolves and thugs before Ken'ichi defeats it with his mini-excavator. He treats the dogman's injuries, who says the thugs will never stop attacking Croton unless he moves away. Mary is healed, and Ken'ichi suggests Croton and his family move to North Pole's estate. The dogman takes care of the thugs to repay his debt to Ken'ichi before moving away. Ken'ichi completes his biodiesel fuel and sells the bear's corpse to obtain its meat, but Snowflake warns him that the grimoire is useless to people without magic. Primura arrives and scolds Ken'ichi for leaving without telling anyone. After clarifying that she turned down North Pole's proposal and refusing to leave without him, she seduces him in her hotel room. When they reach the cabin, Anemone and Myarey quickly become jealous of Primura and vice versa. After installing another bathtub, Anemone insists on bathing with him while Primura and Myarey share the other tub. Later, Ken'ichi tries a fireball spell from the grimoire, but fails. Anemone tries the spell and instantly creates a huge fireball.
8	"The Timid Mage"; Transliteration: "Ozu-ozu to Shita Mahō-tsukai" (Japanese: オズオズとした魔法使い)	Shigeki Awai	Masanao Akahoshi	Hiroshi Hara	February 27, 2025
The fireball starts a fire that is quickly put out using fire extinguishers, but Anemone faints with a fever. Ken'ichi helps her recover with canned peaches. They invite Mary and her mother Cineria for a barbecue using the bear's meat as food. After being impressed by his food and picture books, Primura offers to sell them in Astrantia and Mary and Cineria offer to help. They start selling them from a food cart, but two belligerent men claim a fly is in their food and threatens them. A tiger beastwoman named Nyamena saw that they planted the fly and drives them off, so Primura hires her as a bodyguard. Nyamena joins the household and makes Myarey jealous. Anemone has improved enough to create fireballs at will and wants to be an adventurer. Ken'ichi finds gemstones in the cliffside and eagerly mines them. He also has Myarey and Anemone help build a scaffold against the cliff. Nyamena tries to seduce Ken'ichi, but Myarey stops her. Business improves enough that Primura hires a girl named Iris to manage a second restaurant selling Ken'ichi's food. In the capital, Princess Lilith and her mother learn of Ken'ichi's exploits and are intrigued.
9	"So It's a Spider, So What?"; Transliteration: "Kumo desu ga...?" (Japanese: クモですが...?)	Shigeki Awai	Masanao Akahoshi	Masaki Ōzora	March 6, 2025
Primura meets Viscountess Canaan du Epatorium while Ken'ichi buys new grimoires from Snowflake. When Primura says Canaan wanted a broach, Ken'ichi provides one with an engraving that resembles Canaan's face, but the girls become jealous. Ken'ichi, Anemone, Myarey, and Vel explore a cave and find gems, but are attacked by a giant spider. It is impervious to arrows and Anemone is too scared to fight, so they escape. After letting Anemone read a new grimoire and training her, they return with Nyamena and kill the spider with insecticide and Anemone's fireball. They learn it was male when an even larger and tougher female attacks. It resists the insecticide and fireball, so they kill it with Anemone's new explosion spell and Ken'ichi's new excavator. After cooking and eating the spider's egg, Ken'ichi teaches the girls how to make cheese. Primura decides to gain Canaan's favor by teaching her the cheese recipe, saying thugs led by the merchant Thogaram have been harassing her restaurants. Canaan sends Thogaram a decree to stop the harassment. Canaan later visits Ken'ichi's house.
10	"The Story of Canals"; Transliteration: "Hori-wari Monogatari" (Japanese: 掘割物語)	Daiki Maezawa	Masanao Akahoshi	Keiji Nakamura, Keiei Yūzumi	March 13, 2025
Canaan explains the king ordered her family to build a canal, but they are behind schedule. She offers her body if Ken'ichi will help, but he settles for a new grimiore. Everyone travels to the construction site in Ken'ichi's car, where they find Myarey's three friends are workers. Their tools from Thogaram's company are too expensive, so Ken'ichi provides tools. He uses his excavator to speed up construction. He moves his cabin there and distributes food to the workers. Canaan has him help her bathe using standard bathtubs that he set up and tries to seduce him, saying she is in a loveless marriage, but he refuses. As construction continues, Canaan insists on helping distribute food and other chores. The girls become jealous of Canaan constantly hitting on Ken'ichi, so he makes her sign a contract to stop. The canal is finished and Ken'ichi demonstrates his powers to the stunned court during the opening ceremony. Primura deduces a court member was the one who hired Shaga to kidnap her. Canaan's husband thanks them for their help and Ken'ichi teaches him, an aspiring writer, how to make picture books. The husband says that Thogaram has been causing trouble and he lacks the funds and manpower to stop him, so Ken'ichi promises to deal with him. Ken'ichi and his family go home with the grimiore. Anemone gets jealous when Primura wins at rock paper scissors for the right to bathe with Ken'ichi while Myarey and Nyamena fight for usage of one of the tubs.
11	"Shock!"; Transliteration: "Shokku!" (Japanese: ショック！)	Mao Yingxing	Masanao Akahoshi	Keiji Nakamura	March 20, 2025
Princess Lilith and her mother discuss Ken'ichi's amazing feat of finishing the canal and decide they must meet him. The family discusses that Anemone may have inherited magic from her mother, Ameria, and Snowflake heard of a mage who resembled her, but Anemone is uninterested in finding her mother. Anemone learns a barrier spell from Canaan's grimoire, but feels a pain and Myarey deduces that she had her first period. After learning what that means, Anemone wants to bear Ken'ichi's child, but he refuses as she is still too young to give birth. Mallow arrives to help against Thogaram and Ken'ichi asks for permission to marry Primura, which he agrees. The two take a liking to Ken'ichi's outdoor table, which comes with an umbrella. Croton, Nyanyas, and North Pole arrive to help as well. Myarey and Nyamena also join the fight; Anemone wants to help too, but Ken'ichi doesn't allow this. They declare war on Thogaram and Vel convinces his catfolk thugs to leave. His human and dogfolk thugs remain, including the one who shot Vel with an arrow, whom North Pole kills. The other thugs are defeated and Ken'ichi summons his two excavators to attack Thogaram's house, scaring him into giving up with Mallow's help. Canaan's husband exiles him from Astrantia and Mallow takes over his business. As he leaves, Thogaram taunts them that Primura will continue to be targeted, making him remember the corrupted nobles that he encountered in the past while also blaming himself for Primura's previous kidnapping. A royal messenger delivers a decree ordering Ken'ichi to visit the king. Canaan and her husband warn him not to ignore it or else the king may attack Astrantia. After Anemone bids Mary goodbye and gifts her with a picture book, the family pack up the house and drive to the capital using Ken'ichi's car.
12	"The Unreasonable, Mischievous Princess"; Transliteration: "Muchaburi Yancha Hime" (Japanese: むちゃぶりやんちゃ姫)	Chisei Hitsu	Masanao Akahoshi	Minoru Ohara	March 27, 2025
Princess Lilith receives the family and informs them the King will receive them in a few months. After taking a joyride in Ken'ichi's car and mini-excavator and trying the luxuries of his cabin, she decides to stay with him, making Anemone jealous and her servants feel outraged. A knight angrily attacks Ken'ichi for getting too close to the princess, but he defends himself with a riot shield and Anemone attacks the knight with spells, which a mage deflects, until Lilith makes him stand down. Vel, Myarey, and Nyamena sense something strange in the castle. Lilith gives some of Ken'ichi's curry to the royal cook to duplicate, then Ken'ichi provides chocolate which the cook cannot duplicate. Meanwhile, the Queen often stares at them from the window in jealousy. Ken'ichi uses rat poison to exterminate rats infesting the castle basement while Primura sells the giant spider's corpse. Lilith later asks him to exorcise supposed ghosts haunting the castle, so he fills a sprayer with holy water and has Vel, Myarey, and Nyamena sniff the ghosts out. They determine the Queen's flower vase is the source and ask her to dispose of it. Lilith grants Ken'ichi and Anemone access to the royal library and he uses equipment (such as a scanner and a laptop) to copy all the books. Lilith then gives him permission to sleep with her maid Mailon, but he instead has her model some sexy outfits. Later, the family is received by the King.
13	"To Sa-Kura..."; Transliteration: "Sa・Kura e..." (Japanese: サ・クラへ...)	Liu Yang	Masanao Akahoshi	Yasumoto Midori, Hachimitsu Honey, Shisono Shisho, Yoshihide Yūzumi	April 3, 2025
The King's court looks down on Ken'ichi and his family for looking plain and having beastfolk. The King and Queen order Ken'ichi to face the court mage, Melissa Rana Nasturtium, in a duel for their entertainment. Melissa allows Ken'ichi's family to help him and summons a dragon as their opponent. They manage to kill it with Anemone's spells and Ken'ichi's large excavator, making Melissa surrender. When Anemone collapses from overexertion, Ken'ichi loses his temper and, speaking through a megaphone, threatens to bring the building down on their heads for the endangerment of his family. Lilith tries to placate him by offering to marry him, but he refuses as he doesn't want to be a tool to nobles, so she asks for a birthday present as a peace offering instead. He gives her a pearl necklace; pearls are extremely rare in this world. The Queen introduces herself as Amaranth and demands a pearl necklace as well, so he gives her one. Amaranth invites him to sleep with her in front of her henpecked husband, but he instead settles for collecting her used furniture. She reveals a noble sold her the cursed flower vase as an assassination plot and an anti-royal faction is using people like Shaga and Thogaram as pawns. Back outside, Melissa tells Anemone that she knew Ameria before her death and encourages her to continue studying magic, hoping to have a rematch someday. Ken'ichi is made a baron. The family drives home in a van and are joined by Lilith and Mailon; Lilith nagged her father until he gave permission. Along the way, they meet Fuyou again. That night, as they eat, Ken'ichi wonders about the mayonnaise mage. Said mage is shown cooking with the help of his power.

== See also ==
- A Journey Through Another World, a light novel series also illustrated by Yamakawa
