= Agents of the Realm =

Webcomic by Mildred Louis

- Cover for Agents of the Realm Volume 1
- Author: Mildred Louis
- Website: agentsoftherealm.com
- Current status/schedule: No longer updating online. Next volume planned for 2024.
- Launch date: March 2014
- Genre: Fantasy

Agents of the Realm is a webcomic by Mildred Louis. Started in 2014, it follows the adventures of five women new to university who become magical girls and must protect this world and as well as another dimension. Agents of the Realm was shortlisted for a Cartoonist Studio Prize in the category "Best Web Comic" of 2017.

In January 2021, all pages of Agents of the Realm were removed from the comic's website. Volumes 1 and 2 are available for purchase, and it was announced that none of Volume 3 will be published until it is fully completed, which is scheduled for 2024.

== Synopsis ==
The story of Agents of the Realm follows five young women – Norah, Adele, Kendall, Paige and Jordan – who are starting college at the fictional Silvermount University. After each discovering brooches that allow them to summon weapons and outfits, they discover they are magical warriors that are destined to defend two different dimensions, connected by a rift at the university. Once, a powerful gem maintained balance between the two worlds, but in a power struggle, it was shattered and became the amulets the main characters now have, and are linked to similarly powered people in the other dimension. The main characters are mentored by Jade Blackwater, who hides information from them. They must also contend with Jade's twin sister, Ruby, who teaches mythology at the university and who has villainous intentions. Initially Jordan is recruited by Ruby, and is convinced that Jade is evil. These young women are trapped by fate and struggling with duty and personal lives, including university, friendships, and relationships.

The webcomic is a magical girl story inspired by series such as Sailor Moon and Magic Knight Rayearth. The main cast of five is predominantly Black, with one Latina woman and one white woman, and these characters have a variety of sexual orientations. Agents of the Realm covers issues such as alcoholism, domestic abuse, and self-harm. Volume 1 of the comic introduces the characters and reveals their powers and the conflict they find themselves a part of, while Volume 2 explores the relationship between their mentor and their mentor's estranged sister, and the problems caused by the group's enemy.

== Development ==
The webcomic is created by Mildred Louis and launched in 2014. In an interview, Louis said that the webcomic started as a joke idea, playing around with the magical girl genre. Louis describes Agents of the Realm as influenced by magical girl stories she grew up with, such as Sailor Moon, as well as her experiences in college. As a black woman, Louis was disappointed not to see characters that look like her in genres that she likes, and used the webcomic "as my chance to unapologetically put them at the forefront and show that we, too, can be heroes." Similarly, she wanted to diversify queer content to include more women of color.

In 2016, Louis successfully held a Kickstarter campaign to publish volume 1 of the comic in print She successfully ran a second Kickstarter in 2018 to release volume 2 of the comic as well as a "remastered" version of volume 1.

The webcomic previously updated twice a week. Ii June 2020 it went on hiatus. Around January 2021, the published issues of Agents of the Realm were removed from the website. As of February 2021, the site consists of links to buy the already-completed books, and links to another site, which says that "the webcomic sites are gone and the stories will no longer be released in that sort of format. They will come up again but not until the stories are finished. That means that they will likely not be back up for at least a few years minimum." Instead production will move from page to page updating to strictly completing eBooks – either in full Volumes/completed Books or Chapter by Chapter (i.e. comic ‘issues’). ". It was also announced that Agents of the Realm Volume 3 would be "undergoing editorial rewrites". According to this website, Volume 3 is slated to come out in "Winter/Spring 2024".

== Reception ==
Agents of the Realm was shortlisted for the Cartoonist Studio Prize in the category "Best Web Comic" of 2017.

A 2016 ComicsAlliance article said the comic has "a growing legion of fans since it started almost two years ago" and that Agents of the Realm is "a profoundly real story, with women who experience life in all its ups and downs". Articles on the A.V. Club described the webcomic as "balanc[ing] fantastic story elements with rich character development" and as having "the ability to create [a story] starring very different women with more ethical quandaries and powerful contradictions than the average comic tackles in a decade," the latter article declaring it one of the best comics of 2016. Paste Magazine also declared it one of "40 of the best webcomics" in 2016; a Paste Magazine review praised Louis's "vibrant colors, expressive faces and excellent comedic timing". Describing the art style, a reviewer for CBR said, "Mildred Louis' Agents of the Realm doesn't, at a glance, look like it was inspired by manga. Her style bears more similarity to the Hernandez brothers than to the dewy-eyed teens who populate most shoujo titles. The characters don't look like elegant models, but rather like harried, exhausted college students." A reviewer for Autostraddle added, "Louis can draw exasperated, exhausted and annoyed faces better than just about anyone on the internet."
