= The Strongest Man, Born from Misfortune =

Japanese light novel series

- First light novel volume cover

不運からの最強男 (Fuun Kara no Saikyō Otoko)
- Genre: Isekai
- Novel series
- Written by: Fukufuku
- Published by: Shōsetsuka ni Narō
- Original run: 2017 – 2020
- Novel series

Revised version
- Written by: Fukufuku
- Published by: Shōsetsuka ni Narō
- Original run: November 5, 2020 – present
- Light novel
- Written by: Fukufuku
- Illustrated by: Zun Nakabayashi
- Published by: Starts Publishing
- Imprint: Grast Novels
- Original run: March 25, 2022 – present
- Volumes: 4
- Manga
- Written by: Fukufuku
- Illustrated by: Zun Nakabayashi
- Published by: Starts Publishing
- English publisher: NA: MangaPlaza
- Imprint: Grast Comics
- Magazine: Comic Grast
- Original run: October 22, 2021 – present
- Volumes: 9
- Anime television series
- Directed by: Shigetaka Ikeda
- Written by: Aki Mizuki
- Studio: East Fish Studio
- Original run: 2027 – scheduled
- icon

The Strongest Man, Born from Misfortune (Japanese: 不運からの最強男, Hepburn: Fuun Kara no Saikyō Otoko) is a Japanese light novel series written by Fukufuku and illustrated by Zun Nakabayashi. The series was originally posted as a web novel in 2017 on the online publishing platform Shōsetsuka ni Narō, with a revised version starting serialization in November 2020. Starts Publishing began releasing it as a light novel under its Grast Novels imprint in March 2022; four volumes have been released as of March 2025. A manga adaptation illustrated by Nakabayashi began serialization in Starts Publishing's online magazine Comic Grast in October 2021, and has been compiled into nine volumes as of June 2026. An anime television series adaptation produced by East Fish Studio is set to premiere in 2027.

== Plot ==
The series follows a man who suffered from bad luck in a previous life. After losing his life in an accident after trying to retrieve his stolen bag from a thief, he is offered a chance to be reincarnated in another world. He is reborn as Siegbert, a baby who is born to a warm and loving family and is blessed with good luck. As he grows older, he vows to protect his family, wanting to thank them for the love and care they showed him, while also trying to avoid suffering the same bad luck as he did in his past life.

== Characters ==
Siegbert (ジークベルト, Jīkuberuto)
Gert (ゲルト, Geruto)

== Media ==
=== Light novel ===
The series was originally posted by Fukufuku as a web novel on the online publishing platform Shōsetsuka ni Narō in 2017. They later deleted the original version and started serializing a revised version on November 5, 2020. Starts Publishing later began publishing it as a light novel under its Grast Novels imprint featuring illustrations by Zun Nakabayashi on March 25, 2022; four volumes have been released as of March 2025.

No.	Japanese release date	Japanese ISBN
1	March 25, 2022	978-4-81-379132-4
2	December 22, 2022	978-4-81-379196-6
3	March 22, 2024	978-4-81-379316-8
4	March 28, 2025	978-4-81-379436-3

=== Manga ===
A manga adaptation illustrated by Nakabayashi began serialization in Starts Publishing's online magazine Comic Grast on October 22, 2021. It has been compiled into nine tankōbon volumes as of June 2026. The manga is published in English on NTT Solmare's MangaPlaza website.

No.	Japanese release date	Japanese ISBN
1	March 25, 2022	978-4-81-376099-3
2	September 22, 2022	978-4-81-376132-7
3	March 23, 2023	978-4-81-376177-8
4	September 22, 2023	978-4-81-376229-4
5	March 22, 2024	978-4-81-376296-6
6	September 27, 2024	978-4-81-376359-8
7	March 28, 2025	978-4-81-376426-7
8	September 26, 2025	978-4-81-376497-7
9	March 27, 2026 (ebook); June 26, 2026 (print)	978-4-81-376621-6

=== Anime ===
An anime television series adaptation was announced on September 16, 2025. It will be produced by East Fish Studio and directed by Shigetaka Ikeda, with the series composition and screenplays handled by Aki Mizuki, and characters designed by Yumiko Hara and Yūki Nagata. The series is set to premiere in 2027.

== Reception ==
By September 2025, the series had over 1.5 million copies in circulation.
