= May Tachibana =

Japanese voice actress

- 橘 めい
- Born: November 19, 2008 (age 17); Tokyo, Japan
- Occupations: Actress, voice actress
- Years active: 2025–present
- Agent: Amuse Inc.

May Tachibana (橘 めい, Tachibana Mei; born November 19, 2008) is a Japanese actress and voice actress from Tokyo who is affiliated with Amuse Inc. She began her voice acting career in 2025 while in high school, voicing the character Maki in the visual novel Virtual Girl @ World's End. In 2026, she became known for her roles as Fuu Nonoyama in Magical Sisters LuluttoLilly and as Misaki Sata in Tetsuryō! Meet with Tetsudō Musume, as well as being cast as Raika Suga, the vocalist of the in-universe band Ikka Dumb Rock! In the multimedia franchise BanG Dream!.

== Filmography ==
=== Anime ===
2025

- Honey Lemon Soda, Mikarin
- The Fragrant Flower Blooms with Dignity, Kikyō student (episode 11)
- Touring After the Apocalypse, High school girl (episode 6)

2026

- Magical Sisters LuluttoLilly, Fuu Nonoyama
- Tetsuryō! Meet with Tetsudō Musume, Misaki Sata

=== Video games ===
- Virtual Girl @ World's End, Maki/Mai (2025)
- BanG Dream! Our Notes, Raika Suga (2026)
