= Monthly Carol =

Japanese manga magazine

- Cover of the February 1984 issue (featuring Erica Hill's Story by Chieko Hara)
- Categories: Shōjo manga
- Frequency: Monthly
- Publisher: Kodansha
- First issue: April 1983
- Final issue: July 1984
- Country: Japan
- Based in: Tokyo
- Language: Japanese

Monthly Carol (Japanese: 月刊キャロル, Hepburn: Gekkan Kyaroru; stylized as CAROL) was a shōjo manga magazine published by Kodansha starting in March 1983, and discontinued in 1984.

== Overview ==
Carol was a sister magazine to Nakayoshi, a girls' manga magazine also published by Kodansha. Carol's catchphrase regularly printed on covers alongside the title was "A fun manga magazine for primary school girls" (小学生のたのしいまんが誌), which matched its target demographic. Its most notable works were manga adaptations of Studio Pierrot's TV anime Creamy Mami, the Magic Angel and Toei Animation's Little Memole. Later issues of Carol frequently featured complementary merchandise and promotional gifts. The magazine ceased publication with the July 1984 issue, which coincided with the end of Creamy Mami's TV airing schedule.

Several tankōbon were released by Kodansha under the CAROL label. Creamy Mami was released in two volumes and a special third volume adapting the OVA Eien no Once More. Erica Hill's Story and VIVA! Akane-chan were released in two volumes. Candy ♥ Romance and Secret Garden got single volumes.

== Serializations ==
Title	Mangaka	Starting Issue	Ending Issue
Little Memole	Takahata Rie	March 1983	July 1984
Creamy Mami, the Magic Angel	Kitagawa Yuko	July 1983	July 1984
VIVA! Akane-chan	Kimiko Uehara	April 1983	July 1984
Gokigen Pochetto-kun	Okano Kinya	April 1983	July 1984
Ore wa Matawa Chiro~!	Shuuji Sakamoto	April 1983	July 1984
Chiaki's Pineapple Diary	Takahata Rie	April 1983	December 1983
Ukiuki Doing	Toi Sachiko	April 1983	October 1983
Otome no Burenbasuta	Narui Toshirou	April 1983	July 1984
Secret Garden	Fumizuki Kyouko	April 1983	January 1984
Futari de Cherry	Mitsuru Miura	April 1983	March 1984
Miracle Rabbi-chan	Takanashi Teppei	June 1983	March 1984
Sata-chan's March	Nobuko Hama	June 1983	August 1983
Munyu Munyu Land, a Fun Country Full of Animals	Angel Matsumoto	July 1983	February 1984
Erica Hill's Story	Chieko Hara	October 1983	July 1984
Candy ♥ Romance	Ito Kako	November 1983	January 1984
Hashire! Happy Road	Mami Kizaki	January 1984	March 1984
Yanchahime	Angel Matsumoto	April 1984	July 1984
3chome to Suzume-tachi	Sakou Sakae	April 1984	May 1985
Miri-chan Senpu	Seto Minori	April 1984	July 1984
Salad Field Communication	Ito Kako	May 1984	July 1984
Kawai-so Yama Oniko-chan	Konami Kanata	May 1984	July 1984
Tondemo Lunch	Tsubasa Nunoura	April 1984	July 1984

== See also ==
- Nakayoshi
