= Tetsuryō! Meet with Tetsudō Musume =

Japanese anime television series

- Key visual

てつりょー！meet with 鉄道むすめ
- Created by: Tomytec; Kisetsu Morita
- Anime television series
- Directed by: Misuzu Hoshino
- Written by: Aya Satsuki
- Music by: Sōnosuke Takao
- Studio: East Fish Studio
- Licensed by: Sentai Filmworks: SEA: Medialink
- Original network: Tokyo MX, BS Fuji
- Original run: October 9, 2026 – present
- Episodes: 7
- icon

Tetsuryō! Meet with Tetsudō Musume (てつりょー！meet with 鉄道むすめ) is an anime television series produced by East Fish Studio. It is directed by Misuzu Hoshino, with series composition handled by Aya Satsuki, characters designed by Hisanori Hashimoto, and music composed by Sōnosuke Takao. The series is based on the Tetsudō Musume franchise created by Tomytec, but features an original story. It premiered on October 9, 2026, on Tokyo MX and BS Fuji. The opening theme song is "GO! GO! RAILWAY!!" performed by Asaka, and the ending theme song is "Watashi Miraisen" (わたし未来線; 'My Future Line') performed by Tetsuryo Club (May Tachibana, Hika Tsukishiro, Mao Shōji, and Haruna Fukushima). Sentai Filmworks licensed the series in North America, the UK, Ireland and Australia for streaming on Hidive. Medialink licensed the series in Southeast Asia for streaming on Ani-One Asia's YouTube channel.

== Premise ==
The series follows four university students who are interested in railways. As members of the Railway Travel Club, they travel to various train stations and meet characters from the Tetsudō Musume franchise.

== Characters ==
Misaki Sata (佐多 みさき, Sata Misaki)
Voiced by: May Tachibana
Usa Harutachi (春立 うさ, Harutachi Usa)
Voiced by: Hika Tsukishiro
Kodama Orihara (折原 こだま, Orihara Kodama)
Voiced by: Mao Shōji
Ushio Yagami (矢神 うしお, Yagami Ushio)
Voiced by: Haruna Fukushima
Yayoi Nakano (中野 弥生, Nakano Yayoi)
Voiced by: Fūka Izumi
Arisa Nishiura (西浦 ありさ, Nishiura Arisa)
Voiced by: Yukari Anzai
Chihaya Asakura
Voiced by: Yuki Nakashima
Sakie Ashio
Voiced by: Asami Seto
Shiina Igusa
Voiced by: Hana Hishikawa
Juri Okuwa
Voiced by: Ayaka Ōhashi
Sia Kasukabe
Voiced by: Hikaru Tono
Misya Kamii
Voiced by: Yuuki Temma
Ibuki Kawagoe
Voiced by: Yurika Kubo
Miyabi Kinugawa
Voiced by: Misaki Kuno
Akana Kurihashi
Voiced by: Mana Kumasaki
Misaki Kо̄jiro
Voiced by: Minami Takahashi
Minano Sakurazawa
Voiced by: Haruki Iwata
Konomi Shibaguchi
Voiced by: Nene Hieda
Azami Takashima
Voiced by: Iori Saeki
Izumi Tachikawa
Voiced by: Misa Segawa
Tsukushi Togawa
Voiced by: Suzuka Hara
Karen Matsukaze
Voiced by: Kana Ichinose
Kinu Watarase
Voiced by: Shiori Mikami

== Episodes ==
No.	Title	Directed by	Written by	Storyboarded by	Original release date
1	"Where Should I Go?"; Transliteration: "Don'na Tokoro ni, Ikou ka na?" (Japanese: どんなところに、行こうかな？)	Mizusu Hoshino	Aya Satsuki	Mizusu Hoshino	October 9, 2026
2	"What is the Tetsuryo Club?"; Transliteration: "Tetsuryō-kai tte, Nandesu ka?" (Japanese: てつりょー会って、なんですか？)	Taiki Nishimura	Aya Satsuki	Mizusu Hoshino	October 16, 2026
3	"Working is... Hard Work!"; Transliteration: "Hataraku no tte... Taihen Desu" (Japanese: 働くのって…大変です。)	Kazane Suzumori	Aya Satsuki	Misuzu Hoshino	October 23, 2026
4	"How's the Weather Over There?"; Transliteration: "Sochira no Tenki wa Dōdesu ka?" (Japanese: そちらの天気はどうですか？)	Yang Liu	Aya Satsuki	Minoru Ōhara	October 30, 2026
5	"I Don't Want Things to Stay Awkward, So…"; Transliteration: "Kimazui Mama wa, Iya Dakara." (Japanese: 気まずいままは、いやだから。)	Kounosuke Mutou	Aya Satsuki	Minoru Ōhara	November 6, 2026
6	"Sometimes, Misaki Has to Try Her Best Alone!"; Transliteration: "Misaki, Tama ni wa Hitori de Ganbarimasu!" (Japanese: みさき、たまにはひとりで頑張ります！)	Kounosuke Mutou	Aya Satsuki	Misuzu Hoshino	November 13, 2026
7	"I Want to Make Lots of Memories!"; Transliteration: "Omoide Ippai, Tsukuritai Desu!" (Japanese: 思い出いっぱい、つくりたいです！)	Misuzu Hoshino	Aya Satsuki	Motomasa Maeda	November 20, 2026
