= Reiko Ōmori =

Japanese voice actress and J-pop idol singer (born 1984)

Reiko Ōmori (大森 玲子, Ōmori Reiko; born March 21, 1984, in Hakodate) is a Japanese voice actress and J-pop idol singer who voiced the title character (Miho Shinohara A.K.A. Fancy Lala) in Fancy Lala and also sang the opening and ending themes.
