= Takako Ōta =

Japanese voice actress and singer (born 1967)

Takako Ōta (太田貴子, Ōta Takako), also transliterated as Takako Ohta (born August 13, 1967) is a Japanese voice actress and singer, best known for voicing the lead role of Yū Morisawa / Creamy Mami in anime Creamy Mami, the Magic Angel.

Creamy Mami is known as a pioneer of the new marketing strategy, now known as "media mix". The anime was used to promote a new, unknown idol singer. The real idol singer, Takako Ōta, acted as an idol singer (Creamy Mami) in the anime. The opening theme Delicate ni Suki Shite was her first song in the real world too. Even though Ōta was a new singer and not a trained voice actress, she voiced Yū/Creamy Mami, with great success. The anime Creamy Mami has become famous and Ōta gained popularity that still exists today.

== Anime ==
- Adesugata Mahou no Sannin Musume (OVA) as Yuu Morisawa/Creamy Mami
- Arion as Pio
- Creamy Mami, the Magic Angel (TV) as Yū Morisawa/Creamy Mami
- Creamy Mami, the Magic Angel: Curtain Call (OVA) as Yuu Morisawa/Creamy Mami
- Creamy Mami, the Magic Angel: Long Good-Bye (OVA) as Yu Morisawa / Creamy Mami
- Creamy Mami, the Magic Angel: Eien no Once More (OVA) as Yu Morisawa / Creamy Mami
- Majokko Club Yoningumi – A Kuukan Kara no Alien X (OVA) as Yuu Morisawa / Creamy Mami
- Nausicaä of the Valley of the Wind (film) as Pejite Girl

== Discography ==
=== Albums ===
- 1984: Creamy Takako
- 1984: Graduation
- 1985: Long Good-bye
- 1985: Mi N Na Genki (み・ん・な Genki!)
- 1985: Takako Collection
- 1986: 200%
- 1986: Backseat Lovers
- 1986: Want
- 1986: Best Selection
- 1987: Pop Station
- 1987: Takako Ohta Bestests!
- 1987: Truth
- 1988: Here, There and Nowhere
- 1988: Diamond Collection
- 1988: Best of Best
- 1989: Thanks
- 1989: Magician
- 1990: Takako Ohta Vol. 1 Best Pop
- 1990: Takako Ohta Vol. 2 Best Rock
- 1990: Heart of Eyes
- 1991: Love Ya – The Best of Takako
- 1998: Takako CD-R Vol. 1
- 1999: Takako CD-R Vol. 2
- 1999: Takako Again...
- 2000: Ohta Takako Best Collection (太田貴子 ベストコレクション)
- 2004: Ohta Takako Golden Best (太田貴子 ゴールデン☆ベスト)

=== Singles ===
- 1983: "Delicate ni Suki Shite" ("デリケートに好きして")
- 1983: "Bin Kan Rouge" ("Bin Kan ルージュ")
- 1984: "Love Sarigenaku" ("Love さりげなく")
- 1984: "Natsu ni Awatenaide" ("夏にあわてないで")
- 1984: "Heartbreak Mistake" ("ハートブレイク・ミステイク")
- 1985: "Tenshi no Miracle" ("天使のミラクル")
- 1985: "Heart no Season" ("ハートの Season")
- 1985: "Koishitara Delicacy" ("恋したらデリカシー")
- 1986: "Wasure China no Aoi Tori" ("忘れチャイナの青い鳥")
- 1987: "Kanjitai Emotion" ("感じたい Emotion")
- 1987: "Machikado no Billy the Kid" ("街角のビリー・ザ・キッド")
- 1988: "1988 – From Tokyo"
- 1989: "Hurry Up!"
- 1989: "Girlfriend"
- 1990: "Magician (In the Midnight)"
- 1990: "Makenaide (God Bless You)" ("負けないで (God Bless You)")
- 2008: "Delicate ni Suki Shite" (21st century version) ("デリケートに好きして" (21st century version))
