= Tetsudō Musume =

Japanese multimedia franchise

鉄道むすめ
- Created by: Tomytec
- Novel

Ganbare! Tetsudō Musume
- Written by: Koichi Muraki
- Illustrated by: Natsuki Mibu
- Published by: Gakken
- Imprint: Gakken Mook
- Published: March 30, 2007
- Manga

Tetsudō Musume: Terminal Memory
- Written by: Tomytec
- Illustrated by: Matsuda98
- Published by: ASCII Media Works
- Imprint: Dengeki Comics
- Magazine: Dengeki Daioh
- Original run: June 27, 2008 – February 27, 2009
- Volumes: 1
- Video game

Tetsudō Musume DS: Terminal Memory
- Publisher: Takara Tomy
- Genre: Adventure game
- Platform: Nintendo DS
- Released: October 9, 2008
- Television drama

Tetsudō Musume: Girls Be Ambitious
- Original network: TV Kanagawa
- Original run: October 10, 2008 – January 9, 2009
- Episodes: 13
- Anime television series
- Tetsuryō! Meet with Tetsudō Musume (2026)

Tetsudō Musume (鉄道むすめ; lit. 'Railway Girls') is a Japanese multimedia franchise created by Tomytec, a subsidiary of Takara Tomy. It focuses on female characters working for various railway networks in Japan, with each one based on a real-life railway or train. The characters are used as mascots in promotional material and collaborations. The franchise was originally launched in November 2005 with the release of toy figures by Tomytec, which was followed by the release of novels, voice dramas, a manga series and a video game. A television drama aired from October 2008 to January 2009, and an original anime television series based on the franchise premiered in October 2026.

== Premise ==
The franchise focuses on a collection of female characters who work at various real-world railway networks across Japan. Each character has a name based on a real-life train station or a railroad's characteristics, and each is depicted wearing their respective railway network's uniforms. The characters are then used by these railway companies as mascots for promotional activities. One example is Arisa Nishiura, a character designed for the Matsuura Railway who has become a mascot and tourism ambassador for Arita, Saga. Another example is Konori Kinosaki, a character designed for the West Japan Railway Company.

== Media ==
=== Figures ===
The franchise was originally launched as a toy figure set by Tomytec, a subsidiary of Takara Tomy, in November 2005. By 2010, 1.3 million figures had sold, and the basic series itself had sixty types of figures.

Several collaboration events have been held for the figure line, including a Sanriku Railway train in Iwate Prefecture which offered Arisu Kuji-themed sweets and reached full capacity, as well as a local revitalization event dedicated to Minami Kurihashi, formed due to the 2010 merger of Kurihashi and Kuki in Saitama Prefecture.

=== Audio ===
A collection of CDs featuring voice dramas and character songs was released by Lantis from June 2007 to March 2008.

=== Novel ===
A novel adaptation titled Ganbare! Tetsudō Musume (がんばれ！ 鉄道むすめ) written by Koichi Muraki and illustrated by Natsuki Mibu was released by Gakken under its Gakken Mook imprint on March 30, 2007.

=== Manga ===
A manga series titled Tetsudō Musume: Terminal Memory (鉄道むすめ 〜Terminal Memory〜) illustrated by Matsuda98 was serialized in ASCII Media Works' Dengeki Daioh magazine from June 27, 2008, to February 27, 2009. The series' chapters were collected into a single tankōbon volume published on April 27, 2009.

=== Video game ===
A video game titled Tetsudō Musume DS: Terminal Memory (鉄道むすめDS 〜Terminal Memory〜) was released for the Nintendo DS on October 9, 2008. Two versions were released: a standard edition, and a limited edition that included a figure of the character Tsukushi Tonokawa.

=== Television drama ===
A live-action television drama titled Tetsudō Musume: Girls Be Ambitious (鉄道むすめ～Girls be ambitious～) aired on TV Kanagawa and other channels from October 10, 2008, to January 9, 2009. The opening theme was "Want You Darling" by Mao Abe, while there was a rotating selection of ending songs by three artists: "Ichibanhoshi" (1–2) and "Kimi e no Chizu" (3–4) by Aya Inaoka; "Yume no Kakera" (5–6) and "Destiny" (7–8) by Ceui; and "Kinenbi ni Aimashou" (episodes 9 and 10), "Susume" (11 and 12), and "To The Light" (13) by Jinco.

==== List of episodes ====
No.	Title	Directed by	Written by
1–2	"Railway Idol Apprentice: Raika Tachibana"; Transliteration: "Tetsudō Aidoru Minarai: Tachibana Raika" (Japanese: 鉄道アイドル見習い 橘らいか)	Makoto Tanaka	Yoshimasa Akamatsu
3–4	"Ueda Electric Railway: Mai Yagisawa"; Transliteration: "Ueda Dentetsu: Yagisawa Mai" (Japanese: 上田電鉄 八木沢まい)	You Hirose	Tomohiro Yokomaku
5–6	"Tokyo Monorail: Airu Haneda"; Transliteration: "Tōkyō Monorēru: Haneda Airu" (Japanese: 東京モノレール 羽田あいる)	Masatoshi Tōjō	Tomohiro Yokomaku
7–8	"Chōshi Electric Railway: Tsukushi Tonokawa"; Transliteration: "Chōshi Dentetsu: Togawa Tsukushi" (Japanese: 銚子電鉄 外川つくし)	John Hijiri	Yoshimasa Akamatsu
9–10	"Fujikyuko: Mina Otsuki"; Transliteration: "Fujikyūkō: Ōtsuki Mīna" (Japanese: 富士急行 大月みーな)	Ryuken Sato	Yoshimasa Akamatsu
11–12	"Saitama Rapid Railway: Misono Kawaguchi"; Transliteration: "Saitama Kōsoku Tetsudō: Kawaguchi Misono" (Japanese: 埼玉高速鉄道 川口みその)	Masatoshi Tōjō	Tomohiro Yokomaku
13	"Keisei Electric Railway: Yukari Nakayama"; Transliteration: "Keisei Dentetsu: Nakayama Yukari" (Japanese: 京成電鉄 中山ゆかり)	Ryuken Sato	Tomohiro Yokomaku

=== Anime ===
An original anime television series based on the franchise, Tetsuryō! Meet with Tetsudō Musume, premiered in October 2026.
