= Creamy Mami, the Magic Angel =

Magical girl anime series

- Promotional image
- 魔法の天使クリィミーマミ
- Genre: Magical girl
- Created by: Kazunori Itō
- Developed by: Kazunori Itō
- Directed by: Osamu Kobayashi
- Music by: Kōji Makaino
- Country of origin: Japan
- Original language: Japanese
- No. of episodes: 52 (list of episodes)

Production
- Executive producer: Yuji Nunokawa
- Producers: Minoru Ōno; Yoshitaki Suzuki; Masaaki Fushizawa
- Production company: Studio Pierrot

Original release
- Network: NNS (NTV)
- Release: 1 July 1983 – 29 June 1984

Related
Further information
Manga
Written by	Kazunori Itō
Illustrated by	Yuuko Kitagawa
Published by	Kodansha
Magazine	Monthly Carol
Original run	1983 – 1984
Volumes	3
Original video animation
Once More Forever
Directed by	Osamu Kobayashi
Produced by	Minoru Ōno; Yoshitaki Suzuki
Written by	Kazunori Itō
Music by	Kōji Makaino
Studio	Studio Pierrot
Released	28 October 1984
Runtime	92 minutes
Original video animation
Lovely Serenade
Directed by	Tomomi Mochizuki
Studio	Studio Pierrot
Released	28 March 1985
Runtime	30 minutes
Original video animation
Long Goodbye
Directed by	Tomomi Mochizuki
Studio	Studio Pierrot
Released	15 June 1985
Runtime	55 minutes
Original video animation
Song Special 2: Curtain Call
Directed by	Tomomi Mochizuki
Studio	Studio Pierrot
Released	1 February 1986
Runtime	45 minutes
Manga
Magical Angel Creamy Mami and the Spoiled Princess
Written by	Emi Mitsuki
Published by	Coamix
English publisher	NA: Seven Seas Entertainment
Imprint	Bamboo Comics tatan
Magazine	Comic Tatan
Original run	December 21, 2018 – March 18, 2022
Volumes	7

Creamy Mami, the Magic Angel (魔法の天使クリィミーマミ, Mahō no Tenshi Kurīmī Mami) is a magical girl anime television series produced by Studio Pierrot which aired from 1983 to 1984 on Nippon Television. It went on to have four OVA adaptions and featured in other Studio Pierrot special presentations. A three-volume manga was released during the original TV run, with the story written by Kazunori Itō and art by Yuuko Kitagawa. This was the first magical girl anime to be produced by Pierrot, and the first original work from the studio. In 2005, the web poll for TV Asahi's top-100 anime of all time saw Creamy Mami, the Magic Angel poll 82nd. The series is currently streaming in North America via Tubi, RetroCrush, Amazon Prime, Midnight Pulp, and AsianCrush, as of Spring 2020. Thus far, a limited DVD release of all 52 episodes has been successfully crowd-funded at Anime Sols.

== Plot ==
Yū Morisawa is an ordinary 10-year-old girl, until she sees a spaceship floating in the sky. Carried into the ship, she helps a friendly alien called Pino Pino find the Feather Star. In thanks for her assistance he grants her a magical wand, which allows her to transform into a beautiful 16-year-old girl, for one year. She is also given two cats from Feather Star, Posi and Nega, who are to watch over her while she has magical powers. While wandering around the city as a teenager, she accidentally ends up on TV and is asked to sing, which the magic enables her to do remarkably well. Using the alias of Creamy Mami, she becomes an overnight success, and is soon sought to begin a professional career as an idol under Parthenon Productions. Along the way, she also meets past residents of Feather Star and supernatural beings. In addition, she must fight against Snake Joe, a shady character of the rival LP Productions, who is always trying to steal her away and Megumi-chan, another one of Parthenon Productions' top stars.

== Characters ==
Yū Morisawa (森沢優, Morisawa Yū) / Creamy Mami (クリィミーマミ, Kurīmī Mami)
Voiced by: Takako Ōta
A normal 10-year-old girl, Yū harbours a secret crush for her childhood friend Toshio Ōtomo. Given the ability to transform into a beautiful 16-year-old girl, she is made to fill in for the absent Megumi Ayase to sing on TV. Naming herself Creamy Mami, she becomes an overnight hit. Throughout the series, it is a running gag for Mami to frequently be late for appearances like concerts, television filmings, and signings, only to always make it perfectly in the nick of time.
Nega (ネガ, Nega)
Voiced by: Kaneta Kimotsuki
A cat-shaped creature from the Feathery Star, he is asked to watch over Yū Morisawa while she has magical powers. His name is short for negative. Nega was the one who taught Yū the spell which allows her to transform into Creamy Mami, and he also secretly knows many more spells, but is against teaching them to Yu, lest uses magic for self gain. Despite this, once Yū tricked him into saying the magical words to generate a pen which can answer any school question. Despite his brash attitude, he is really fond of Yu.
Posi (ポジ, Poji)
Voiced by: Yūko Mita
One of the two cats from the Feathery Star who is to watch over Yū Morisawa while she has magical powers. Her name is short for positive. She is always supportive of Yu, which sometimes annoys Nega.
Toshio Ōtomo (大伴俊夫, Ōtomo Toshio)
Voiced by: Yū Mizushima
Friend of Yū Morisawa and Midori Kisaragi, he falls in love with Creamy Mami after her first TV appearance. He frequently goes to Creamy Mami's concerts and appearances, acting like her most devoted fan. Halfway through the series until episode 25, Toshio witnesses Yu transforming into Mami, which causes her to lose her magic powers. Yu and Toshio later travel to Feathery Star where Pino-Pino offers to restore Yu's powers in exchange for Toshio's memory of Yu using magic, to which he agrees. Later, he finds a tape of him recording the incident and begins to remember. In the end he finally understands that Mami was Yū all long and that he was in love with Yū all this time. In episode 47, Toshio says that he is 14, making him presumably 13 at the beginning of the series.
Megumi Ayase (綾瀬めぐみ, Ayase Megumi)
Voiced by: Saeko Shimazu
A spoiled and selfish idol who is the top star of Parthenon Productions, she feels threatened by the newcomer Creamy Mami, and proclaims herself Mami's rival. She is particularly jealous of Shingo's affection for Mami, as Megumi is hinted to be madly in love with him.
Shingo Tachibana (立花慎悟, Tachibana Shingo)
Voiced by: Kazuhiko Inoue
The young president of Parthenon Productions, he quickly recognizes Creamy Mami as a future sensation, and tries to make her into a star. It is hinted that he is in love with Megumi and later with Yuu as Creamy Mami.
Hayato Kidokoro (木所 隼人, Kidokoro Hayato; Kidokoro-Manager, 木所マネージャー Kidokoro Manējā)
Voiced by: Sukekiyo Kameyama
Megumi Ayase's bumbling manager who is assigned to managing Creamy Mami when she joins Parthenon Productions. He is continuously subjected to various unfortunate situations and gags, as well as the reprimands of Shingo when Mami is late or anything goes wrong.
Midori Kisaragi (如月みどり, Kisaragi Midori)
Voiced by: Masahiro Anzai
Toshio Ōtomo's best friend, Midori is in love with Yū Morisawa and often enlists Toshio's help to confess or to make Yu fall for him.
Natsume Morisawa (森沢なつめ, Morisawa Natsume)
Voiced by: Mika Doi
Young wife of Tetsuo, and mother of Yū, Natsume works in Creamy with her husband. Her and her husband own Creamy Crepe making crepes.
Tetsuo Morisawa (森沢哲夫, Morisawa Tetsuo)
Voiced by: Akira Murakami
Husband of Natsume, and father of Yū, Tetsuo works in Creamy Crepe shop with his wife.
James SK Wān (温俊花, Wān James SK)
Voiced by: Mashiko Narakami
A struggling writer, Wān is a loyal customer of Creamy Crepes and frequently drops by with his piles of pointless but brilliant manuscripts.
Pino Pino (ピノピノ, Pino Pino)
Voiced by: Seiko Nakano
An alien being from the Feathery Star, Pino-Pino grants Yū Morisawa magical powers for one year in thanks for helping him find the way back to his planet.
Mamoru Hidaka (日高 守, Hidaka Mamoru)
Voiced by: Naomi Zinbo
A boy from a small village in Hokkaido who recently got transferred to Yū's school, he seems to be pretty rude at first, but later becomes friends with Yū due to his huge love for her cats. He says he can understand nature and is one of the few people who realized Nega and Posi aren't normal cats. Due to his upbringing, he is rather ignorant about big cities and is generally pretty outdated with news, to the point of ignoring who Creamy Mami is. Despite being a recurring character, Mamoru never has any real interaction with Mami.

== Episode list ==
No.		Original release date
1	"The Ship of Feather Star"; Transliteration: "Fezasutā no fune" (Japanese: フェザースターの舟)	1 July 1983
2	"A Star is Born!"; Transliteration: "Sutā tanjō!" (Japanese: スター誕生！)	8 July 1983
3	"Debut! Debut!!"; Transliteration: "Debyū！ debyū!!" (Japanese: デビュー！デビュー！！)	15 July 1983
4	"Scramble Top Ten"; Transliteration: "Sukuranburu Toppu Ten" (Japanese: スクランブル・トップテン)	22 July 1983
5	"In Danger?! Mami's Secret!"; Transliteration: "Abunai!? Mami no himitu!" (Japanese: あぶない！？マミの秘密！)	29 July 1983
6	"The Legend of the Stag"; Transliteration: "Densetsu no ojika" (Japanese: 伝説の雄鹿)	5 August 1983
7	"A Bouquet for the Big Boss!"; Transliteration: "Ōoyabun ni hanataba o!" (Japanese: 大親分に花束を！)	12 August 1983
8	"Miracle Duet on the Beach"; Transliteration: "Nagisa no mirakuru dyuetto" (Japanese: 渚のミラクルデュエット)	19 August 1983
9	"The Spirit of Summer"; Transliteration: "Manatsu no yōsei" (Japanese: ま夏の妖精)	26 August 1983
10	"Hello, Catherine"; Transliteration: "Harō Kyasarin" (Japanese: ハローキャサリン)	2 September 1983
11	"Father is a Middle-Aged Motorcyclist"; Transliteration: "Papa wa chūnen Raidā" (Japanese: パパは中年ライダー)	9 September 1983
12	"Blackout in the Studio"; Transliteration: "Sutajio wa daiteiden!" (Japanese: スタジオは大停電！)	16 September 1983
13	"Mami, Through the Looking Glass"; Transliteration: "Kagami no mukō no mami" (Japanese: 鏡のむこうのマミ)	23 September 1983
14	"My Mister Dream"; Transliteration: "Watashi no Misutā Dorīmu" (Japanese: 私のMr.ドリーム)	30 September 1983
15	"The Rainbow-colored Angel"; Transliteration: "Niji iro no tenshi" (Japanese: 虹色の天使)	7 October 1983
16	"The Memory that Vanished into the Sea"; Transliteration: "Umi ni kieta memorī" (Japanese: 海に消えたメモリー)	14 October 1983
17	"The Sleeping, Timeless Forest"; Transliteration: "Toki no nemuru mori" (Japanese: 時のねむる森)	21 October 1983
18	"The Adventure of Zashikiwarashi"; Transliteration: "Zashikiwarashi no bōken" (Japanese: ざしきわらしの冒険)	28 October 1983
19	"Mami's Longest Day"; Transliteration: "Mami no ichiban nagai hi" (Japanese: マミの一番長い日)	4 November 1983
20	"Dangerous Gift!"; Transliteration: "Kiken na okurimono!" (Japanese: 危険なおくりもの！)	11 November 1983
21	"Cute Love Party"; Transliteration: "Kawaii koi no pāti" (Japanese: かわいい恋のパーティ)	18 November 1983
22	"Midori-kun and PuppuKupuu"; Transliteration: "Midori-kun to Puppukupū" (Japanese: みどりくんとプップクプー)	25 November 1983
23	"Parasol of Stars"; Transliteration: "Hoshi no parasoru" (Japanese: 星のパラソル)	2 December 1983
24	"Bear Bear Audition"; Transliteration: "Kuma kuma ōdishon" (Japanese: クマ熊オーディション)	9 December 1983
25	"Disturbance! The Pop Festival"; Transliteration: "Haran! kayōsai no yoru" (Japanese: 波乱！歌謡祭の夜)	16 December 1983
26	"Bye Bye Miracle"; Transliteration: "Bai-bai mirakuru" (Japanese: バイバイ・ミラクル)	23 December 1983
27	"To the Feather Star"; Transliteration: "Fezāsutā e!" (Japanese: フェザースターヘ！)	6 January 1984
28	"The Mysterious Transfer Student"; Transliteration: "Fushigi na tenkōsei" (Japanese: ふしぎな転校生)	13 January 1984
29	"Ropeway Panic"; Transliteration: "Rōpu uei panikku" (Japanese: ロープウェイ・パニック)	20 January 1984
30	"Dear Grandma"; Transliteration: "Zenryaku obāchan" (Japanese: 前略おばあちゃん)	27 January 1984
31	"Yuu's Flashdance"; Transliteration: "Yū no furasshu dansu" (Japanese: 優のフラシュダンス)	3 February 1984
32	"Valentine's Day for Just the Two of Us"; Transliteration: "Futari dake no barentain" (Japanese: 二人だけのバレンタイン)	10 February 1984
33	"The »Atchoo!« of Horrors"; Transliteration: "Kyōfu no hakushon!" (Japanese: 恐怖のハクション！)	17 February 1984
34	"Snake Joe's Counterattack"; Transliteration: "Sunēku Jō no gyakushū" (Japanese: スネークジョーの逆襲)	24 February 1984
35	"Tachibana-san Becomes a Woman!?"; Transliteration: "Tachibana-san on'na ni naru!?" (Japanese: 立花さん、女になる！？)	2 March 1984
36	"Galaxy Circus 1984"; Transliteration: "Ginga sākasu 1984" (Japanese: 銀河サーカス1984)	9 March 1984
37	"Marian's Eyes"; Transliteration: "Marian no hitomi" (Japanese: マリアンの瞳)	16 March 1984
38	"Heart-Fluttering Fan Club"; Transliteration: "Tokimeki fankurabu" (Japanese: ときめきファンクラブ)	23 March 1984
39	"Jurassic Monster Ojira!"; Transliteration: "Juraki kaijū Ojira!" (Japanese: ジュラ紀怪獣オジラ！)	30 March 1984
40	"Creamy Gaoka Flour War"; Transliteration: "Kurimigaoka komugiko sensō" (Japanese: くりみヶ丘小麦粉戦争)	6 April 1984
41	"Beware, Lest You Overstudy"; Transliteration: "Benkyō shisugi ni goyōjin" (Japanese: 勉強しすぎに御用心)	13 April 1984
42	"Mama's Memory of the Stage"; Transliteration: "Mama no omoide sutēji" (Japanese: ママの思い出ステージ)	20 April 1984
43	"Run, Yuu, Faster than the Tortoises!"; Transliteration: "Hashire Yū! kame yori mo hayaku" (Japanese: 走れ優！カメよりも速く)	27 April 1984
44	"SOS! Escape from the Dream Storm"; Transliteration: "SOS! yume arashi kara no dassyutsu" (Japanese: ＳＯＳ！夢嵐からの脱出)	4 May 1984
45	"The Psychic Boy of Sorrow"; Transliteration: "Kanashimi no chōnōryoku shōnen" (Japanese: 悲しみの超能力少年)	11 May 1984
46	"My Wonderful Pianist"; Transliteration: "Watashi no suteki na pianisuto" (Japanese: 私のすてきなピアニスト)	18 May 1984
47	"Mami's First Kiss"; Transliteration: "Mami no fāsuto kisu" (Japanese: マミのファーストキス)	25 May 1984
48	"Yuu and Midori's First Date"; Transliteration: "Yū to Midori no hatsu dēto!" (Japanese: 優とみどりの初デート！)	1 June 1984
49	"Infiltrate! The Treasure of Tachibana-san's House"; Transliteration: "Sen'nyū! Tachibana-san chi no hihō" (Japanese: 潜入！立花さんちの秘宝)	8 June 1984
50	"Mami Disappears"; Transliteration: "Mami ga inakunaru" (Japanese: マミがいなくなる…)	15 June 1984
51	"Toshio, Don't Remember It!"; Transliteration: "Toshio! omoidasanaide" (Japanese: 俊夫！思い出さないで)	22 June 1984
52	"The Final Stage"; Transliteration: "Fainaru sutēji" (Japanese: ファイナル・ステージ)	29 June 1984

== Music ==
=== Original songs ===
By Creamy Mami/Takako Ohta

1. Fall In Love Delicately (Japanese: デリケートに好きして, Hepburn: Derikēto ni Suki Shite) (OP)
2. Staying in My Pajamas (Japanese: パジャマのままで, Hepburn: Pajama no mama de) (ED 1)
3. Love Nonchalantly (Japanese: LOVEさりげなく, Hepburn: LOVE Sarigenaku) (ED 2)
4. BIN KAN Rouge (Japanese: BIN KANルージュ, Hepburn: Bin Kan Rūju)
5. Whisper Je Tame (Japanese: 囁いてジュテーム, Hepburn: Sasayaite Je t'aime)
6. Beautiful Shock (Japanese: 美衝撃)
7. Yuu is Creamy Mami (Japanese: 優のクリィミーマミ, Hepburn: Yū no Kurīmī Mami)
8. The Medicine That Works Best for You (Japanese: あなたに一番効く薬, Hepburn: Anata ni Ichiban Kiku Kusuri)
9. Heart's Season (Japanese: ハートのSEASON, Hepburn: Hāto no SEASON) (Long Good-bye OVA OP)
10. Girls Talk (Japanese: ガールズ・トーク, Hepburn: Gāruzu tōku)
11. I CAN`T SAY "BYE-BYE" (Curtain Call OVA ED)
12. Magical Hourglass (Japanese: 魔法の砂時計, Hepburn: Mahō no sunadokei) (Curtain Call OVA OP)
13. Ma Wa Le Mi Gi (with Saeko Shimazu) (Curtain Call OVA insert song)

By Megumi Ayase/Saeko Shimazu

1. Memory of the Beach (Japanese: 渚のメモリー, Hepburn: Nagisa no Memorī)
2. Last Kiss of Good Luck! (Japanese: ラストキッスでGood Luck!, Hepburn: LAST KISS DE GOOD LUCK!)

=== Tribute album ===
A tribute album was released on February 9, 2011 and features covers by modern voice actors and rerecorded versions by or with Takako Ohta and Saeko Shimazu.

1. MA・WA・LE・MI・GI by Takako Ohta and Tomoe Shinohara
2. Beautiful Shock by Rin Suzuki
3. Delicate ni Sukishite by Marina Inoue
4. The Medicine That Works Best for You by Chie Nakamura
5. Girls Talk by Mariya Ise
6. Heart's Season by Eri Kitamura
7. Memory of the Beach by Tomoe Shinohara
8. Last Kiss of Good Luck! by Saeko Shimazu
9. I Can't Say "Bye-Bye" by Takako Ohta
10. MA・WA・LE・MI・GI by Takako Ohta and Saeko Shimazu
11. Missing Kiss by Takako Ohta
12. Bin Kan Rouge by Yukari Fukui
13. Miracle Angel by Yuka Iguchi
14. Love Nonchalantly by Yu Kobayashi
15. Staying in My Pajamas by Aya Endo
16. Whispering Je t'aime by Hiroko Kasahara

== Impact and influence ==
Along with Wandering Sun (1971) and Super Dimensional Fortress Macross (1982), Creamy Mami is known as a pioneer of the new marketing strategy, now known as media mix. They used an anime to promote a new, lesser-known idol singer. The real pop idol, Takako Ōta, also acted as an idol singer (Creamy Mami) in the story. The opening theme Delicate ni Suki Shite was her first song in the real world too. Even though Ohta was a new singer and not a trained voice actress, she voiced Yū/Creamy Mami. The result was a great success. The anime Creamy Mami has become famous and Ohta gained a high popularity that still exists today.

In 1999, Fuji TV's show Kaishingeki TV Utaemon had a poll to decide the most popular old TV theme song for a 25-year-old audience, and Delicate ni Suki Shite was ranked first. This anime has been repeatedly broadcast over the Internet too.

The same media mix approach was seen in Idol Densetsu Eriko (1989) and Idol Tenshi Youkoso Yōko (1990). The anime version of Full Moon o Sagashite (2002) shared the same format too. Another example is Lemon Angel (1987). Using an anime to promote a singer was not a new concept, as there was Pink Lady Monogatari (1978), a popular anime at the time.

Creamy Mami set the format that would be used for future Studio Pierrot magical girl titles, and was especially influential in Fancy Lala. Creamy Mami also stars in Adesugata Mahou no Sannin Musume, along with Magical Emi and Persia, as well as Majokko Club Yoningumi A-Kukan Kara no Alien X, with Magical Emi, Persia and Pastel Yumi. The popularity of the series not only saw two feature-length sequels, but Creamy Mami also featured in five music video-based productions, starting with the 1985 OVA Lovely Serenade. The second of the feature-length sequels, Magical Angel Creamy Mami Long Goodbye, began with the short animation Mahō no Tenshi Creamy Mami VS Mahō no Princess Minky Momo Gekijou no Daikessen, and where Creamy Mami battled against Ashi Productions' Minky Momo.

Creamy Mami's companions Posi and Nega were also parodied in Gainax's 1991 OAV Otaku no Video, in which Misty May (the magical girl character created by the series' protagonist) has two lion cub companions named Posi-King and Nega-King. The character design for both is based on King the lion cub, a companion of the title character in Gainax's 1990 TV series Nadia: The Secret of Blue Water.

Producer Yuji Nunokawa noted that there was a substantial increase in male fans after Creamy Mami's broadcast due to the shows' use of transformations and enjoyed watching girls using magic to solve their problems in ways men traditionally could not.

A spin-off manga series titled, Magical Angel Creamy Mami and the Spoiled Princess, was launched on Coamix's Comic Tatan website on December 21, 2018. The series is written and illustrated by Emi Mitsuki. The series focuses on the character, Megumi Ayase. The series was released in North America in March 2021 by Seven Seas Entertainment.

== Internationalization ==
Magical Angel Creamy Mami was dubbed into Italian by Studio PV, who released it as L'incantevole Creamy in February 1985. It was also broadcast in France by La Cinq (later on TMC, AB1 and Manga) as Creamy, merveilleuse Creamy on April 29, 1988, and more recently released in French DVD editions (French dub or Japanese and French subtitles) by Declic Image. It was also distributed in Spain as "El Broche Encantado" in 1992.

In these countries the musical theme was the same: in Italy it was sung by Cristina D'Avena, in France by Valérie Barouille and in Spain by Sol Pilas.

The text and music were by Alessandra Valeri Manera and Giordano Bruno Martelli.

The musical base was partially re-orchestrated in France and Spain, and the text was translated and adapted by Charles Level for the French version.

It was dubbed into Cantonese by a Hong Kong TV Station - TVB, who released it as "我係小忌廉" (I am Creamy Mami) on January 7, 1985, showing it from Monday to Friday at 6pm, each time shown half an hour.

Harmony Gold USA (the company best known for the Robotech adaptation) was planning an English dubbed version under the name Pretty Creamy the Perfect Pop Star, but it never saw the light of day. Had it ever been released in English, most of the characters' names would have to be changed to target an English-speaking audience.
