= Why the Hell Are You Here, Teacher!? =

Japanese manga series

- First tankōbon volume cover, featuring Kana Kojima

なんでここに先生が!? (Nande Koko ni Sensei ga!?)
- Genre: Erotic comedy; Romantic comedy
- Manga
- Written by: Soborou
- Published by: Kodansha
- English publisher: NA: Kodansha (BookWalker Exclusive) (digital)
- Imprint: Young Magazine KC
- Magazine: Weekly Young Magazine
- Original run: April 24, 2017 – October 21, 2024
- Volumes: 12
- Anime television series
- Directed by: Hiraku Kaneko (chief); Toshikatsu Tokoro
- Produced by: Koutarou Sudou; Souji Miyagi; Takayuki Harada; Haruya Ishiwata; Takahiro Fujii; Kenichi Kobayashi
- Written by: Yūki Takabayashi; Yuri Fujimaru
- Music by: Gin
- Studio: Tear Studio
- Licensed by: Sentai Filmworks (worldwide rights excluding Asia)
- Original network: Tokyo MX, BS11, AT-X
- Original run: April 8, 2019 – June 24, 2019
- Episodes: 12 + OVA
- icon

Why the Hell Are You Here, Teacher!? (Japanese: なんでここに先生が!?, Hepburn: Nande Koko ni Sensei ga!?), also abbreviated as NanKoko (なんここ), is a Japanese manga series written and illustrated by Soborou. It was serialized in Kodansha's seinen manga magazine Weekly Young Magazine from April 2017 to October 2024; its chapters have been collected in eleven tankōbon volumes as of November 2020. Each volume features different pairs of female teachers and their male students as they inevitably end up in awkward, embarrassing situations as they gradually become couples. An anime television series adaptation by Tear Studio aired from April to June 2019.

== Summary ==
High school student Ichiro Sato keeps finding himself in embarrassingly erotic predicaments with Kana Kojima, a young teacher who has a reputation of being a demon to her students. Later volumes introduce more male students paired with female teachers in similar circumstances.

== Characters ==
=== Teachers ===
Kana Kojima (児嶋 加奈, Kojima Kana)
Voiced by: Sumire Uesaka (Japanese); Maggie Flecknoe (English)
A high school Japanese language teacher at Kawanuma West (川沼西高校) who is nicknamed "Kojima the Demon" (鬼の児嶋, oni no kojima) because of her combustible temper. But when she is close to Ichirō Satō, she is shy and clumsy, and they end up in a number of unseemly erotic situations. It is revealed that she is from the same home town as Sato's mother.^{Ch. 4} As a high school student, she was shy and wore glasses, but was encouraged by Sato to become a teacher.^{Ch. 7} Later on, she and Sato are a couple.^{Ch. 11} A bonus chapter in the first volume shows that she visits him often while he is in college.^{Ch. 10.5} She and Ichiro later get engaged and are living together.
Mayu Matsukaze (松風 真由, Matsukaze Mayu)
Voiced by: Yūko Gotō (Japanese); Melody Spade (English)
Kawanuma West art teacher and student council adviser. Though she is very petite she is also exceptionally well-endowed and styles her hair in braids. She is well-liked by the students who call her "Lady Matsukaze" (聖母松風, Seibo Matsukaze) as she is kind and gentle.^{Vol. 2} Like Kojima, she becomes really clumsy and air-headed when she is around the guy she likes, which would be Rin Suzuki, who helped her in the past when she was trying to get to her teacher certification exam on time.^{Vol. 2}
Hikari Hazakura (葉桜 ひかり, Hazakura Hikari)
Voiced by: Shizuka Ishigami (Japanese); Monica Rial (English)
A physical education teacher from Kawanuma East. She is tomboyish, mischievous and free-spirited, and is liked by her students. She advises the student council and coaches the swim team. She acts very casual around Takashi, and genuinely cares about him. They eventually start dating.^{Vol. 3}
Chizuru Tachibana (立花 千鶴, Tachibana Chizuru)
Voiced by: Nozomi Yamamoto (Japanese); Amber Lee Connors (English)
The Kawanuma East school nurse. She has light grey hair. Her nickname is "Absolute Zero" Tachibana (絶対零度の立花, zettaireido no Tachibana) for her cold and expressionless attitude towards the students. Initially wanting to relate better with students in general, she takes a liking to Ko Tanaka, and has no issue with changing her clothes in front of him. She eventually accepts his confession and they lose their virginity to one another in a love hotel in the bonus chapter.^{Vol. 4} She and Tanaka eventually marry and have a daughter.
Francesca Homura (ホムラ・フランチェスカ, Homura Furanchesuka)
A new assistant language teacher at Kawanuma West. She is 15 years old and a former schoolmate of Saya and Yorito. She had skipped a few grades, studied abroad and graduated from university, and returned to Japan. She likes Yorito and hopes to win his affections.^{Vol. 5}
Izumi Inokawa (猪川泉, Inokawa Izumi)
A geography and history teacher at Asaoka Private Senior High, she is a petite woman with long dark hair who is known as a "stalker ghost" for appearing suddenly near students and revealing their personal information, which she studied so she could become closer to her students.^{Vol. 6}
Sakura Okamoto (岡本桜花, Okamoto Sakura)
A young woman who is a prominent member of a Japanese idol girl group called Natadeko Musume (ナタデコ娘). She and Yamato are childhood friends who Yamato calls her Sakura-nee-chan. She is secretly a very serious person who studies all the time, and becomes a student teacher at Asaoka High under the name Ouka Okamoto and wears glasses and has plain black hair.^{Vol. 7}

=== Students ===
Ichiro Sato (佐藤一 郎, Satō Ichirō)
Voiced by: Ryōta Suzuki, Maki Kawase (young) (Japanese); Austin Tindle (English)
A 17 year old Kawanuma West High School student in his third year who continues to find himself involved in embarrassing situations with his teacher Kana Kojima. He is a good student who is ready to graduate and move on to university.^{Vol. 1} In Volume 2, he reveals to his friend Rin Suzuki that he and Kana are dating.^{Vol. 2} In the Volume 1 bonus chapter, he is a university student who is frequently visited by Kana.^{Vol. 1}
Rin Suzuki (鈴木 凛, Suzuki Rin)
Voiced by: Toshiki Masuda (Japanese); Andrew Love (English)
A second-year student at Kawanuma West. He has a scary appearance because of his size and his eyes, but has been a friend of Satō since junior high. Satō asks Rin to try to make new friends since he is graduating and spending more time with Kana. Rin struggles in that aspect, but more often than not, he finds himself in embarrassing situations with teacher Mayu Matsukaze.^{Vol. 2} Two years later, he and Mayu get married.
Saya Matsukaze (松風 さや, Matsukaze Saya)
Voiced by: Yuka Ōtsubo (Japanese); Sonja Meadow (English)
Mayu's younger sister, a high school student at Kawanuma West and the student council treasurer. She wears glasses, and is more sensible than her air-headed sister.^{Vol. 2-4} She later becomes the student council president.^{Vol. 5}
Takashi Takahashi (高橋 隆, Takahashi Takashi)
Voiced by: Kazutomi Yamamoto, Nozomi Furuki (young) (Japanese); Bryson Baugus (English)
A first-year student at Kawanuma East and the student council treasurer. He is a neighbor to Hazakura-sensei, whom he calls Hika, but is always being treated like a kid by her.^{Vol. 3} Despite this, they eventually start dating and become a couple.
Ko Tanaka (田中 甲, Tanaka Kō)
Voiced by: Yūsuke Kobayashi (Japanese); Howard Wang (English)
A third-year student at Kawanuma East, and friend of Sato and Suzuki from junior high. He was the student council president. Three months prior to graduating, he swears he will have a girlfriend, but ends up in embarrassing situations with Tachibana. His love confession is eventually accepted after he graduates.^{Vol. 4}
Yorito Ito (伊藤 依人, Itō Yorito)
A first-year student at Kawanuma West when Saya becomes a third-year. He has a crush on Saya, but more often than not, finds himself in embarrassing situations with Francesca Homura.^{Vol. 5}
Wataru Watanabe (渡辺渉, Watanabe Wataru)
A third-year high school student at Asaoka High who does not go to school but spends most of his time working. He ends up being with Inokawa-sensei in a number of situations. He starts dating her in the bonus chapter.^{Vol. 6}
Yamato Yamamoto (山本大和, Yamamoto Yamato)
He is childhood friends with Sakura Okamoto, who has since become famous, and is shocked to discover she has become his teacher. He is captain of the track team.^{Vol. 7}

=== Others ===
Saki Sato (佐藤 咲, Sato Saki)
Voiced by: Hitomi Nabatame (Japanese); Jackie Bernard (English)
Ichiro's mother & Kana's childhood friend.
Shio Sato (佐藤 詩緒, Sato Shio)
Voiced by: Hiyori Nitta (Japanese); Kalin Coates (English)
Ichiro's younger sister.
Takeru Inokawa (猪川タケル, Inokawa Takeru)
Izumi's younger brother.

== Media ==
=== Manga ===
Manga author Soborou first published a series of one-shots titled Golden Times (ゴールデンタイムズ, Gōruden Taimuzu) in Kodansha's seinen manga magazine Weekly Young Magazine from October 10, 2015, to July 11, 2016; the title was later changed to Why the Hell Are You Here, Teacher!?, and six installments were published in the same magazine from October 17 to November 21, 2016. The serialization started in the same magazine on April 24, 2017. In August 2020, it was announced that the manga would go on hiatus due to the author's illness starting to worsen; the series resumed after a four-year hiatus on August 19, 2024, and finished on October 21 of the same year. Kodansha collected its chapters in 12 tankōbon volumes, released from January 6, 2017, to January 6, 2025.

In June 2020, it was announced that BookWalker Global partnered with Kodansha USA to publish the series in English, with the first three volumes released digitally on July 14, 2020.

==== Volumes ====
No.	Original release date	Original ISBN	English release date	English ISBN
1	January 6, 2017	978-4-06-382904-4	July 14, 2020	—
High school student Ichiro Sato keeps finding himself in erotic situations with Kana Kojima, a young teacher who has a reputation of being a demon. They are locked in a bathroom stall and Kana has to pee. When Ichiro excuses himself to the infirmary, he finds Kana there with a high fever and is forced to give her a suppository. Kana accidentally ends up in the men's baths, so Ichiro pretends that she is a sex doll to fool his classmates. Kana visits Ichiro's mother and takes care of Ichiro's baby sister. Ichiro and Kana get stuck in a laundromat when the power goes out. Ichiro tries to retrieve a love letter message but finds himself stuck with Kana who is trying to discreetly borrow a book about how to be more social. When Ichiro helps Kana unpack in her apartment, they come across a photo of when Kana was a shy student and was befriended by Ichiro. Ichiro's mother gets Kana drunk so she can be uninhibited and make a move on Ichiro. Kana is dressed as a mummy in the school festival haunted house, but is stuck with Ichiro when she has a wardrobe malfunction. Kana and Ichiro are on a beach when Kana gets bitten near her crotch by a sea snake. The bonus chapter has Ichiro at university and Kana visiting to ask him about sex ed.
2	September 6, 2017	978-4-06-510150-6; 978-4-06-510348-7 (LE)	July 14, 2020	—
Now that Ichiro is with Kana, Rin Suzuki is left to try to make new friends, but he ends up in embarrassing and erotic situations with Mayu Matsuzaki, a kind but clumsy teacher. Situations include falling into a pond, getting her clothes stuck in a train door, getting tangled with a bicycle. Ichiro and Kana are stuck together in a pipe. More erotic situations occur when Rin and Mayu walk home with Rin's kid siblings and a fast food meal toy falls into her blouse. At a water park, Mayu gets entangled in an inflatable ring. At the school's communications room, they get entangled in cables while Mayu's sister Saya overhears them. While Rin visits Mayu's place to tutor Saya, Mayu takes a bath but Rin accidentally walks in and then tries to hide her when Saya comes. When Rin gets an art lesson from Mayu and Saya volunteers to model, Mayu's breasts get stuck in Rin's art easel. Mayu recalls meeting Rin for the first time three years ago when she was trying to get to her teacher exam. Bonus chapters feature Kana playing with a love egg but inadvertently leaving the video chat with Ichiro on, and Rin trying to hide Mayu and Saya in a mixed bath.
3	January 5, 2018	978-4-06-510804-8; 978-4-06-510899-4 (LE)	July 14, 2020	—
At Kananuma East, student Takashi Takahashi keeps finding himself in erotic situations with physical education teacher and childhood friend Hikari Hazakura. Hika pulls Taka into her bed at the infirmary. Later they fall into each other in the PE equipment room. Hika takes Taka shopping at a lingerie store. Rin and Mayu must share a bed for the night while Hika tries to spy on them, but Hika accidentally falls on Taka. When Taka collapses on a mountain hike, Hika recalls an incident when they were younger. Taka and Hika must recover their clothes after she accidentally drops them outside a school window. Hika accidentally burns her bottom, and has Taka try to cool it down. At the school festival, Hika slaps Mayu with handcuffs, leaving Rin and Mayu to recover the key. When Hika accidentally falls through the floor and gets stuck, Taka must try to push her out. The bonus chapters have Mayu and Saya comparing their bodies, and Taka trying to fit Hika into a tight swimsuit.
4	May 7, 2018	978-4-06-511380-6; 978-4-06-510348-7 (LE)	August 18, 2020	—
Ko Tanaka is a senior who vows to get a girlfriend before he graduates, but ends up in erotic situations with the cool beauty school nurse Chizuru Tachibana. Chizuru changes clothes in front of him several times which often results in them falling into each other. She goes to Ko's place dressed in a Santa outfit. For New Year's she wants to tie a fortune to a tree branch, but falls into Ko. On an island trip together, they have more falls, and also during an alumni video interview. At school in the winter snow, they try to stay warm by a heater. After graduation, the teachers and students have a party at Ko's house, but when Chizuru needs to change her clothes, she gets tangled in fishing line. The bonus chapter has Ko and Chizuru going to a love hotel.
5	October 5, 2018	978-4-06-513157-2; 978-4-06-513748-2 (LE)	September 15, 2020	—
Yorito Ito joins Kawanuma West where he hopes to win the affections of Saya who is now student council president, but they discover that Francesca Homura, their mutual friend, has come back to Japan as an assistant teacher. Yori ends up in multiple erotic situations including when they are hiding under the stairs or slipping in the bathtub. Saya and Yori help Francesca come up with better teaching strategies, but Francesca falls asleep early and snuggles up to and disrobes Yori while asleep. As a birthday gift, Yori agrees to listen to Francesca's wishes for the day, and they go exploring in the woods, but a warning about bears in the area causes Francesca to fall down a slope. When Yori arrives they have to stick together when they suspect a bear is nearby.
6	March 6, 2019	978-4-06-514807-5; 978-4-06-514808-2 (LE)	October 13, 2020	—
7	June 20, 2019	978-4-06-515747-3; 978-4-06-513770-3 (LE)	November 10, 2020	—
8	September 6, 2019	978-4-06-513771-0; 978-4-06-513771-0 (LE)	January 12, 2021	—
9	December 6, 2019	978-4-06-517858-4; 978-4-06-513772-7 (LE)	January 12, 2021	—
10	May 7, 2020	978-4-06-519541-3; 978-4-06-519559-8 (LE)	February 9, 2021	—
11	November 6, 2020	978-4-06-521335-3; 978-4-06-521334-6 (LE)	September 14, 2021	—
12	January 6, 2025	978-4-06-538274-5	—	—

=== Anime ===
An anime television series adaptation was announced in the 44th issue of Weekly Young Magazine on October 1, 2018. The series was directed by Toshikatsu Tokoro and animated by Tear Studio. Character designs for the series were done by Kazuhiko Tamura. Yūki Takabayashi and Yuri Fujimaru handled the series composition, while Hiraku Kaneko served as chief director and Gin composed the music. The series aired from April 8 to June 24, 2019, on Tokyo MX, BS11, and AT-X. (Note: Tokyo MX listed the series premiere on April 7 at 25:05, which is effectively April 8 at 1:05 a.m. JST) Sumire Uesaka performed the series' opening theme song "Bon Kyu— Bon wa Kare no Mono" (ボン♡キュッ♡ボンは彼のモノ♡). The series' ending theme is "Ringo-iro Memories" (りんご色メモリーズ), with Uesaka, Yūko Gotō, Shizuka Ishigami, and Nozomi Yamamoto each performing a version as their respective characters.

Sentai Filmworks licensed the series for worldwide regions, excluding Asia. The series ran for 12 episodes. An unaired episode was included in the anime's Blu-ray box, which was released on December 11, 2019. On July 6, 2019, Sentai announced that they were producing a dub for the series.

==== Episodes ====
No.	Title	Animation Director	Screenplay	Storyboard	Original release date
1	"First Period"; Transliteration: "Gōrudentaimuzu / Ase shiri izumi" (Japanese: ゴールデンタイムズ / 汗尻泉)	Kazuhiko Tamura	Yuuki Takabayashi	Tokoro Toshikatsu	April 8, 2019
High school student Ichiro Sato keeps finding himself in erotic situations with Kana Kojima, a young teacher who has a reputation of being a demon. They are locked in a bathroom stall and Kana has to pee. When Ichiro excuses himself to the infirmary, he finds Kana there with a high fever and is forced to give her a suppository.
2	"Second Period"; Transliteration: "Amayadori/ fūrin-jiru" (Japanese: 雨宿り / 風梨汁)	Kazuhiko Tamura, Toshimitsu Kobayashi, Yuichiro Miyake	Yuri Fujimaru	Tokoro Toshikatsu	April 15, 2019
Ichiro and Kana get stuck in a laundromat when the power goes out. Kana visits Ichiro's mother and takes care of Ichiro's baby sister.
3	"Third Period"; Transliteration: "Yoi dore/ otonage" (Japanese: よいどれ / 大人げ)	Iwasaki Minoru, Onogi Sansei, Many Sonoda, Yuichiro Miyake	Yuri Fujimaru	Makoto Tanaka	April 22, 2019
When Ichiro helps Kana unpack in her apartment, they come across a photo of when Kana was a shy student and was befriended by Ichiro. Ichiro's mother gets Kana drunk so she can be uninhibited and make a move on Ichiro.
4	"Fourth Period"; Transliteration: "Yakusoku" (Japanese: 約束)	Matsushita Kiyoshi Yuichiro Miyake Akira Otsuka	Yuuki Takabayashi	Makoto Tanaka	April 29, 2019
Kana and Ichiro take Ichiro's little sister to the beach.
5	"Fifth Period"; Transliteration: "Seibo in / ma n ◯ n densha" (Japanese: 聖母in / まん◯ん電車)	Wang Weifeng, Takeshi Kushita, Akira Otsuka	Yuri Fujimaru	Tokoro Toshikatsu	May 6, 2019
Now that Ichiro is with Kana, Rin Suzuki is left to try to make new friends, but he ends up in embarrassing and erotic situations with Mayu Matsukaze, a kind but clumsy teacher. Situations include falling into a pond during lunch time, and getting her clothes stuck in a train door.
6	"Sixth Period"; Transliteration: "Uki uki DAY/ pigi ~i bakku" (Japanese: ウキ雨季DAY / ぴぎぃバック)	Akira Otsuka, Yuki Kitajima, Yuichiro Miyake, Hayakawa Naomi	Yuri Fujimaru	Fujishiro Kazuya	May 13, 2019
7	"Seventh Period"; Transliteration: "Misshon Imposshiburu / Raburabu o Kaimono" (Japanese: ミッション淫ポッシブル / ラブラブお買いもの)	Unknown	Unknown	TBA	May 20, 2019
8	"Eighth Period"; Transliteration: "Sounan Desu ne / Kīsutōn" (Japanese: ソウナンですね / キーすとーん)	Unknown	Unknown	TBA	May 27, 2019
9	"Ninth Period"; Transliteration: "Sikin '/ Tokoro YOU-ken" (Japanese: Sikin' / 所YOU権)	Unknown	Unknown	TBA	June 3, 2019
10	"Tenth Period"; Transliteration: "Muhyōjō/ Shanpantsu" (Japanese: 無氷情 / シャンパンツ)	Unknown	Unknown	TBA	June 10, 2019
11	"Eleventh Period"; Transliteration: "Kaisui Yoku / Sōnyū Hora" (Japanese: 海水欲 / 挿入洞)	Unknown	Unknown	TBA	June 17, 2019
12	"Twelfth Period"; Transliteration: "Bitā & Ūīto / Omedeta" (Japanese: 美ター&吸ィート / おめでた)	Unknown	Unknown	TBA	June 24, 2019
OVA	"Thirteenth Period"; Transliteration: "Nande Koko ni Sensei-tachi ga!?" (Japanese: なんでここに先生たちが!?)	Unknown	Unknown	TBA	December 11, 2019

== Reception ==
Anime News Network reviewers had mixed reviews about the anime series. James Beckett wrote, "This isn't a 'good' show, but God help me, I chuckled a little at just how unashamed it was." Lynzee Loveridge wrote that "it's edited porn airing on a Japanese satellite station." Nick Creamer wrote that the episode "definitely knows how to set up a sexually charged scene, and even has the production values to make its characters look genuinely attractive". Theron Martin wrote "If you find suppositories and someone holding in pee to be sexy then you might like this one, but it's definitely aimed only at a certain kind of kink."

Allen Moody of THEM Anime Reviews gave the anime series 1 out of 5 stars, noticing the "tiresomely repetitive fanservice formula in use" and heavy censoring that "None of this is really funny- as presented, it's not sexy either-" He found the groping scenes to be endlessly repetitive, and "along with all the related humiliation and embarrassment of the women here, that finally completely wore out my patience".

== Works cited ==
- "Ch." is shortened form for chapter and refers to a chapter number of the manga.
