= Howard Wang =

American voice actor

- Wang in 2026
- Born: April 28, 1993 (age 33)
- Education: DigiPen Institute of Technology
- Occupations: Video game designer; voice actor
- Years active: 2016–present
- Website: www.howardwangvo.com

Howard Wang (born April 28, 1993) is an American voice actor, known for his work in anime dubs.

Prior to pursuing voice acting, Wang used to work at Riot Games after moving out to California. Outside of voice acting, he also runs a VTuber channel known as Dust XinXue.

== Filmography ==
=== Japanese animated series ===
List of voice performances in anime series
Year	Title	Role	Notes	Source
2016	Touken Ranbu: Hanamaru	Kikkou Sadamune		
2016	Yuri on Ice	Guang-Hong Ji		
2016	Rio: Rainbow Gate!	Ray		
2017	Tsugumomo	Kazuya Kagami	Lead role	
2017	Hellsing Ultimate Abridged	Walter (young)		
2017	Sakura Quest	Noge (young)		
2017	Love Tyrant	Nakashima		
2017	Restaurant to Another World	Rokei		
2017	Gamers!	Eiichi Misumi		
2017	Classroom of the Elite	Reo Kondo		
2017	A Centaur's Life	Mochida		
2017	King's Game The Animation	Naoya Hashimoto		
2018	Junji Ito Collection	Ishizaka		
2018	Tokyo Ghoul:re	Ryuta Sawaike, Hidenori Tateshima, Miyuki Mikage		
2018	Overlord	Natel Inyem Dale Carvain		
2018	B't X	Doctor Nitzin		
2018	Kakuriyo: Bed and Breakfast for Spirits	Mitsunari		
2018	Lord of Vermilion: The Crimson King	Suruga		
2018	Free!	Saotome		
2018	This Boy is a Professional Wizard	Kashima Chiharu		
2018	Hanebado!	Male Adult Coach 10A	Episode: "The Backhand Grip Is Like This!"	
2018	Tada Never Falls in Love	Kentaro Yamashita		
2018	Hinomaru Sumo	Yomoda		
2018	RErideD: Derrida, who leaps through time	Graham		
2018	SSSS.Gridman	Hayakawa		
2018	Golden Kamuy	Cikiapasi		
2018	Ulysses: Jeanne d'Arc and the Alchemist Knight	Henry V		
2018	Hitorijime My Hero	Yoshida		
2018	Goblin Slayer	Young Scout, Light Warrior		
2018	A Certain Magical Index	Management	Episode: "The Dark Side of Academy City"	
2018–19	Dragon Ball Super	Mohito, Panchia		
2019	Kono Oto Tomare! Sounds of Life	Sentaro Miya		
2019	Kämpfer	Natsuru Senō (Male)	Lead role	
2019	Mix	Tоuma Tachibana	Lead role	
2019	Sarazanmai	Keiss Meemor		
2019	Nichijou - My Ordinary Life	Ogi		
2019	Why the Hell Are You Here, Teacher!?	Kou Tanaka		
2019	Actors: Songs Connection	Uta		
2019–22	Haikyu!!	Tsutomu Goshiki, Rintaro Suna		
2020	Grisaia: Phantom Trigger	Haruto Aoi		
2020	Kakushigoto	Kakushi Goto	Lead role	
2020	Gleipnir	Naoto		
2021	SK8 the Infinity	Langa	Lead role	
2021	Thus Spoke Rohan Kishibe	Minoru Kaigamori	Episode: "Mutsu-kabe Hill"	
2021	Sleepy Princess in the Demon Castle	Bigwig Penguin		
2021	Fire Force	Tamaki's father		
2021	Kuroko's Basketball	Tatsuya Himuro	Season 2	
2021	Pretty Boy Detective Club	Nagahiro Sakiguchi		
2021	The Prince of Tennis II Hyotei vs. Rikkai Game of Future	Ryoga Echizen	ADR Director, Script Writer	
2021–25	My Hero Academia	Shihai Kuroiro		
2021	Moriarty the Patriot	Louis James Moriarty	Main role	
2021	Life Lessons with Uramichi Oniisan	Kumatani		
2021	Welcome to Demon School! Iruma-kun	Wetoto		
2021	Ikebukuro West Gate Park	Takashi	Lead role	
2021	The Case Study of Vanitas	Gilles		
2021	Kageki Shojo!!	JPX Fan, Staff		
2021	The World Ends with You: The Animation	Support Reaper		
2021	2.43: Seiin High School Boys Volleyball Team	Tomoki Kakegawa		
2021	Tokyo Revengers	Hajime Kokonoi		
2021–23	Beyblade Burst	Wakiya Murasaki		
2022	Salaryman's Club	Mikoto Shiratori	Lead role	
2022	Attack on Titan	Ulklin Reiss	Episode: "Memories of the Future"	
2022	One Piece	Ichiji		
2022	Saiyuki Reload: Zeroin	Cho Hakkai	Lead role	
2022	Engage Kiss	Shu Ogata	Lead role	
2022	Komi Can't Communicate	Chushaku Kometani		
2022	JoJo's Bizarre Adventure: Stone Ocean	Narciso Anasui, Anakiss		
2022	RWBY: Ice Queendom	Whitley Schnee		
2022	Shinobi no Ittoki	Ittoki Sakuraba	Lead role	
2023	Demon Slayer: Kimetsu no Yaiba	Sumiyoshi	Episode: "Someone's Dream"	
2023	Mashle: Magic and Muscles	Abel Walker		
2023	My Love Story with Yamada-kun at Lv999	Takuma Furukawa		
2023–present	Rurouni Kenshin	Himura Kenshin	Main role	
2024	The Seven Deadly Sins: Four Knights of the Apocalypse	Edlin		
2024	Kaiju No. 8	Haruichi Izumo		
2025	Witch Watch	Tenryu Kiyomiya		
2025	Tougen Anki	Tsubakiri Momomiya		
2026	Mission: Yozakura Family	Kai Izuno		

=== Non-Japanese animated series ===
List of voice performances in animated series
Year	Title	Role	Notes	Source
2016-present	RWBY	Whitley Schnee		
2021	Heaven Official's Blessing	Xie Lian	Chinese donghua; English dub Lead role	

=== Films ===
List of voice performances in films
Year	Title	Role	Notes	Source
2018	Hells	Ryuu Kutou		
2021	Josee, the Tiger and the Fish	Tsuneo Suzukawa	Lead role	
2022	Bubble	Denki Ninja Member E		
2024	Mobile Suit Gundam: Silver Phantom	Fixzi Fix	VR movie	

=== Live Action ===
List of dubbing performances in live action
Year	Title	Role	Notes	Source
2023	Ultraman Z	Shinya Kaburagi	English dub	

=== Video games ===
List of voice performances in video games
Year	Title	Role	Notes	Source
2018	Paladins: Champions of the Realm	Khan	Voice the Ameri-Khan voice collection	
2019	Borderlands 3	Gustav, Young Jed		
2021	Regalia: Of Men and Monarchs	Carran		
2021	Fire Emblem Heroes	Pelleas		
2021	Pokémon Masters	Falkner		
2022	Fire Emblem Warriors: Three Hopes	Additional voices		
2022	Azure Striker Gunvolt 3	Apollo		
2023	Octopath Traveler II	Hikari Ku		
2023	Fitness Circuit	Ray		
2023	Master Detective Archives: Rain Code	Yomi Hellsmile		
2023	Honkai: Star Rail	Luka		
2023	Tower of God: New World	Wangnan Ja		
2023	Avatar: The Last Airbender - Quest for Balance	Lao Beifong		
2023	Like a Dragon Gaiden: The Man Who Erased His Name	Additional voices		
2024	Like a Dragon: Infinite Wealth	Additional voices		
2024	Granblue Fantasy Versus: Rising	Sandalphon, Bloody-Blood Stabby Man		
2024	Granblue Fantasy: Relink	Sandalphon		
2024	Unicorn Overlord	Gammel		
2024	Sand Land	Additional voices		
2024	The Legend of Heroes: Trails Through Daybreak	Aaron Wei, The Tyrant, citizens		
2024	Romancing SaGa 2: Revenge of the Seven	Victor		
2025	The Legend of Heroes: Trails Through Daybreak II	Aaron Wei		
2025	Guilty Gear Strive	Venom		
2025	Yakuza 0 Director's Cut	Tetsu Tachibana		
2025	Overwatch 2	Wuyang		
2025	Story of Seasons: Grand Bazaar	Jules		
2025	Hyrule Warriors: Age of Imprisonment	Quino		
2026	Code Vein II	Valentin Voda		
2026	Yakuza Kiwami 3 & Dark Ties	Additional voices		
2026	Fatal Fury: City of the Wolves	Kim Jae Hoon		
2026	Arknights: Endfield	Argent Flow		
