= Asread =

Japanese animation studio

- Type: Kabushiki-gaisha
- Industry: Japanese animation
- Founded: November 2003
- Founder: Kiyonori Hiramatsu
- Headquarters: Sakae-cho, Higashimurayama, Tokyo, Japan
- Key people: Kiyonori Hiramatsu (CEO)
- Total equity: 2 million yen
- Number of employees: 17 (Note: 8 animators, 5 producers, and 4 painters.)
- Website: www.asread.net

Asread Co., Ltd (株式会社アスリード, Kabushiki-gaisha Asurīdo) stylized as asread. is a Japanese animation studio established in November 2003 by ex-Xebec members.

== Works ==
=== Television works ===
Year	Title	Director(s)	Animation producer(s)	Source	Eps.	Refs.
2005–2006	Shuffle!	Naoto Hosoda	Kiyonori Hiramatsu	Visual novel	24	
2007	Shuffle! Memories	Naoto Hosoda	Kiyonori Hiramatsu	Visual novel	12	
2008	Minami-ke: Okawari	Naoto Hosoda	Kiyonori Hiramatsu	Manga	13	
2008	Ga-Rei: Zero (co-animated with AIC Spirits)	Ei Aoki	Kiyonori Hiramatsu; Yoshiyuki Matsuzaki	Manga	12	
2009	Minami-ke: Okaeri	Kei Oikawa	Kiyonori Hiramatsu	Manga	13	
2011–2012	Future Diary	Naoto Hosoda	Kiyonori Hiramatsu	Manga	26	
2013	I Couldn't Become a Hero, So I Reluctantly Decided to Get a Job	Kinji Yoshimoto	Kiyonori Hiramatsu	Light novel	12	
2016	Big Order	Nobuharu Kamanaka	Kiyonori Hiramatsu	Manga	10	
2018	Lord of Vermilion: The Crimson King (co-animated with Tear Studio)	Eiji Suganuma; Satoshi Takafuji	Hiroshi Kudou	Card game	12	
2019	Arifureta: From Commonplace to World's Strongest (co-animated with White Fox)	Kinji Yoshimoto	Kiyonori Hiramatsu	Light novel	13	
2021	Mother of the Goddess' Dormitory	Shunsuke Nakashige	Kiyonori Hiramatsu	Manga	10	
2022	Arifureta: From Commonplace to World's Strongest 2nd Season (co-animated with Studio Mother)	Akira Iwanaga	Kiyonori Hiramatsu	Light novel	12	
2024	Arifureta: From Commonplace to World's Strongest 3rd Season	Akira Iwanaga	Kiyonori Hiramatsu	Light novel	16	
2026	A Misanthrope Teaches a Class for Demi-Humans	Akira Iwanaga	Kiyonori Hiramatsu	Light novel	13	

=== OVA/ONAs ===
Year	Title	Director(s)	Animation producer(s)	Source	Eps.	Refs.
2009	Minami-ke: Betsubara	Kei Oikawa	Kiyonori Hiramatsu	Manga	1	
2011	Busō Chūgakusei: Basket Army	Romanov Higa	Kiyonori Hiramatsu; Keiko Nashimoto; Atsushi Masaoka	Original work	5	
2012	Corpse Party: Missing Footage	Akira Iwanaga	—N/a	Video game	1	
2013	Corpse Party: Tortured Souls	Akira Iwanaga	—N/a	Video game	4	
2013	Future Diary: Redial	Naoto Hosoda	Kiyonori Hiramatsu	Manga	1	
2014	I Couldn't Become a Hero, So I Reluctantly Decided to Get a Job	Kinji Yoshimoto	Kiyonori Hiramatsu	Light novel	1	
2015	Big Order	Nobuharu Kamanaka	Kiyonori Hiramatsu	Manga	1	
2019–2022	Arifureta: From Commonplace to World's Strongest (co-animated with White Fox (#1–2) and Studio Mother (#3–4))	Kinji Yoshimoto (#1–2); Akira Iwanaga (#3–4)	Kiyonori Hiramatsu	Light novel	4	

== Notable staff ==
=== Representative staff ===
- Kiyonori Hiramatsu (founder and president)

=== Animators ===
- Hidetsugu Hirayama (2005~present)
