= I Couldn't Become a Hero, So I Reluctantly Decided to Get a Job =

Japanese light novel series

- Cover of the first light novel volume featuring Phino Bloodstone (left) and Raul Chaser (right)

勇者になれなかった俺はしぶしぶ就職を決意しました。 (Yūsha ni Narenakatta Ore wa Shibushibu Shūshoku o Ketsui Shimashita)
- Genre: Fantasy comedy
- Light novel
- Written by: Jun Sakyou
- Illustrated by: Masaki Inuzumi
- Published by: Fujimi Shobo
- Imprint: Fujimi Fantasia Bunko
- Original run: January 20, 2012 – July 20, 2014
- Volumes: 10
- Manga
- Written by: Misaki Mori
- Published by: Fujimi Shobo
- Magazine: Age Premium
- Original run: February 9, 2013 – June 9, 2014
- Volumes: 4
- Manga
- Written by: Gao Yuzuki
- Published by: Square Enix
- Magazine: Young Gangan
- Original run: May 2, 2013 – May 2, 2014
- Volumes: 3
- Anime television series
- Directed by: Kinji Yoshimoto
- Produced by: Atsushi Itou
- Written by: Masashi Suzuki
- Music by: Hiroaki Tsutsumi; Masaru Yokoyama
- Studio: Asread
- Licensed by: AUS: Madman Entertainment; NA: Sentai Filmworks; UK: MVM Entertainment
- Original network: Tokyo MX, AT-X, BS11, TV Saitama, CTC, tvk, Sun TV, TVQ, GBS, SBS
- English network: US: Anime Network
- Original run: October 5, 2013 – December 21, 2013
- Episodes: 12 + OVA

I Couldn't Become a Hero, So I Reluctantly Decided to Get a Job, (Note: Japanese: 勇者になれなかった俺はしぶしぶ就職を決意しました。, Hepburn: Yūsha ni Narenakatta Ore wa Shibushibu Shūshoku o Ketsui Shimashita) also known in its short form as Yu-Shibu, is a Japanese light novel series written by Jun Sakyou and illustrated by Masaki Inuzumi. The series was awarded Gold in the 23rd Fantasia Awards. An anime adaptation by Asread aired from October to December 2013.

== Plot ==
The story revolves around a young man named Raul Chaser who dreamed of becoming a hero with his team of skilled heroes-in-training, but due to the collapse of the Demon Empire, the Hero Program was suspended. With Raul's dream crushed, he was forced to find a new line of work and ended up employed at a small department store called Magic Shop Leon. Raul's life since then has been busy but dull, when one day someone arrives at the store applying for a job. Raul finds out that the new hire is the Demon Lord's child and also happens to be a cute girl.

== Characters ==
Raul Chaser (ラウル・チェイサー, Rauru Cheisā)
Voiced by: Keisuke Kōmoto
Raul is a former Hero candidate at the Hero School. He had to find a job after the Demon Lord was defeated and he could not become a Hero. Raul meets the Demon Lord's daughter who is in search of a job, and at first mistakes her for a boy. He is often annoyed by her but at the end of the day is glad that she is around and likes her positive enthusiasm.
Phino Bloodstone (フィノ・ブラッドストーン, Fino Buraddosutōn)
Voiced by: Azusa Tadokoro
Phino is the daughter of the deceased Demon Lord. She lacks common sense due to living in the Demon World and is really carefree. She is very positive and she often say jokes. Phino involuntarily tends to scare off many customers because of her weird way of speaking about violent things when discussing products with them. She might be harboring some feelings for Raul.
Airi Altinate (アイリ・オルティネート, Airi Orutinēto)
Voiced by: Kanae Iwasaki
Raul's self-proclaimed former rival from Hero School. After she could not become a Hero either, she started working as bunnygirl in the shop that is rivals with Leon shop, but instead lies to Raul about being a security guard. Due to the fact that she always scored top marks in her examinations, Raul usually addresses her as "All A". She likes Raul, but she is tsundere so she denies it when pointed out.
Seara August (セアラ・オーガスト, Seara Ōgasuto)
Voiced by: Maina Shimagata
The manager of the magic shop, who is always smiling. She has a very soft angelic voice, and is very nice to her workers and appears as if she sometimes tries to involve Raul and Phino in situations that would make them attracted to each other. She can also change magical items to fight with.
Visor Crossroad (バイザー・クロスロード, Baizā Kurosurōdo)
Voiced by: Yoshihisa Kawahara
Childhood friend of Seara and the assistant manager of the magic shop, Visor was once a magic engineer. He sometimes mocks Raul to not do anything stupid with his employees. He cares a lot about the shop.
Nova Luminous (ノヴァ・ルミナス, Nova Ruminasu)
Voiced by: Madoka Sowa
Part of the magic shop's staff, Nova is a cheerful but really clumsy girl. Although sometimes an old man who "shops" at Leon tends to stroke her buttocks whenever in the premises, she does not mind getting touched like that.
Lore Periferal (ロア・ベリフェラル, Roa Beriferaru)
Voiced by: Kumi Takaragi
Part of the magic shop's staff, she is Raul's upperclassman. She works mostly with the deliveries and doing mechanics such as fixing faults, so Lore is not often seen in the shop. Very quiet, tomboyish, and reserved.
Elza Crucial (エルザ・クルーシアル, Eruza Kurūshiaru)
Voiced by: Emi Nitta
Elza is the manager of Lawson Station, a convenience store next to the magic shop. She is fascinated by catalogs of magical items. She also likes Raul, something that is occasionally teased by her coworker and friend Ramdimia.
Ramdimia Do Aximemor (ラムディミア・ド・アクセィメモール, Ramudimia do Akusimemōru)
Voiced by: Natsumi Yamada
An employee at Lawson Station like Elza, who's also from the Demon World. Her name is well known in the Demon World, so she mostly gets annoyed when people shorten her name (such as "Ram-chan"), so she often corrects them by stating her full name. She is coworkers and a friend of Elza and teases her about her obvious crush on Raul.

== Media ==
=== Light novels ===
The light novels are written by Jun Sakyou, and illustrated by Masaki Inuzumi. It was published by Fujimi Shobo. Its original run began on January 20, 2012, and finished on July 20, 2014, with 10 total volumes.

=== Anime ===
The anime television series aired in Japan from October 5 to December 21, 2013. It was produced by Asread and directed by Kinji Yoshimoto, with Masashi Suzuki handling series composition and writing the scripts, Tetsuya Takeuchi designing the characters and Hiroaki Tsutsumi and Masaru Yokoyama composing the music. There are a total of 12 episodes and 1 OVA.

No.	Title	Directed by	Original air date
1	"I Couldn't Be a Hero, So I'm Working the Register"; Transliteration: "Yūsha ni Nare Nakatta Ore wa Reji o Utte i Masu" (Japanese: 勇者になれなかった俺はレジを打っています。)	Kinji Yoshimoto	October 5, 2013
Raul Chaser, the main character, is shown training to be a hero alongside Airi "All A", among others. At the end of the session they find out that another hero has defeated the Demon Lord and there is no longer any need for them to train. When next we see Raul, he is reluctantly working at a magic appliance store called 'Leon', since there is a severe lack of jobs for people with his particular skill set. Enter Fino, the Demon Lord's daughter, who demands to see the manager. Raul mistakes this as her wanting to make a complaint against him and does not react well to the idea. To his surprise she pulls out a resume and goes off with the manager, leaving the resume behind. Given her attire, Raul thought that Fino was male, but, on reading the resume, finds out his error along with Fino's severe lack of skills even for this type of job. (One line of the resume also reads 'I don't have anywhere to go, please let me live here.') Raul hurries to the manager's office only to find that Fino has been hired.
2	"The Demon Lord's Daughter Is Going to Learn How to Speak to Customers"; Transliteration: "Maō no Musume-san ga Sekkyaku Yōgo o Oboeru yō Desu" (Japanese: 魔王の娘さんが接客用語を覚えるようです。)	Lin Mingwei	October 12, 2013
Raul tries to teach Fino how to greet customers properly, only for her to misspeak and end up scaring customers away, frustrating both of them. He later has a brief encounter with Airi who becomes angry at him for forsaking his dream to become a hero. Still later, Raul goes off to meet and catch up with two of his friends from the hero academy, Blaze and Klein. When he returns to the store that evening, Fino, having memorized all of the customer service lines he taught her, tries her best to show Raul how much effort she put in while he was gone.
3	"We Should Be Careful When Handling Weird Products Sent to Us by Corporate"; Transliteration: "Honsha Kara Okurare te Kuru Ayashii Shōhin ni Ki o Tsuke Masho u" (Japanese: 本社から送られてくる怪しい商品に気をつけましょう。)	Kaoru Suzuki	October 19, 2013
The workers at Leon receive a strange product, and everyone tries to figure out how to work it. When Fino attempts to help, her body releases too much magic, causing the product to go out of control and a number of appendages extend from the product ensnaring Airi, Fino and Nova. It is up to Raul to effect a rescue but can he still fight after so long a hiatus? With Fino's help Raul manages defeat the Witch's Arm, but passes out due to the strain of using his skills without recent practice.
4	"The Daughter of the Demon Lord Will Be Working at the Convenience Store"; Transliteration: "Maō no Musume-san ga Konbini de Hataraku yō Desu" (Japanese: 魔王の娘さんがコンビニで働くようです。)	Yasuo Ejima	October 26, 2013
Lawson, the convenience store next door to Leon, needs an extra worker for a day, so Elsa, the manager, comes over and asks to borrow one of the Leon staff. Seara, the manager, volunteers to go but is prevented by the assistant manager. She then volunteers Fino, who initially refuses, stressing her loyalty to Leon, but relents when Seara makes it an order. Raul is apprehensive about this decision, fearing that Fino may do something wrong or make something explode. Fortunately, with a little help from Elsa and Lamdimia, Fino is able to hold her own. Later, Raul comes over to "buy lunch", checking on Fino's performance. Meanwhile at Leon, with Fino gone, Raul starts to get nervous around Nova as he starts to take notice of things he did not before.
5	"I Couldn't Be a Hero so I Snuck into a Rival Store with the Daughter of the Demon King"; Transliteration: "Yūsha ni Nare Nakatta Ore to Maō no Musume-san ga Raibaru Ten ni Sennyū Shi Masu" (Japanese: 勇者になれなかった俺と魔王の娘さんがライバル店に潜入します。)	Shū Watanabe	November 2, 2013
Leon experiences a downturn in sales due to the big new magic store, Amada, opening in town. Since they are having a slow day, Raul and Fino go undercover on the manager's orders to see what all the fuss is about. When Raul notes that Fino is drawing attention to herself, she recalls Seara's advice and starts to act like his girlfriend. While they are investigating, Raul helps an older woman find the air conditioners out of habit, even though it is helping the 'enemy'. During a performance of the idol group Sphere, Raul runs in to Airi but in an unexpected manner.
6	"She Couldn't Become a Hero, so She Reluctantly Decided to Get a Job, Too"; Transliteration: "Yūsha ni Nare Nakatta Kanojo mo Shibushibu Shūshoku Shi te i Mashi Ta" (Japanese: 勇者になれなかった彼女もしぶしぶ就職していました。)	Naoki Hishikawa	November 9, 2013
Airi was a straight A student in hero school and is embarrassed to have to admit that she is working as a bunny-girl at the rival magic store. She gives them a tour of the store and is relieved to learn that Fino is only pretending to be Raul's girlfriend. As they go around, Airi is groped by an overly-friendly customer who is chased off by Raul and Fino. This draws the attention of management who reveal that they knew from the start just who Raul and Fino were. Elsewhere, the assistant manager and Lore are given a tour of an appliance manufacturer where they find that the reason their prices are so low is that they use no cost monster labour. The manufacturer also reveals that they are part of the Amada group and were told to give the people from Leon a tour if they showed up. On the way back from Amada, Raul and Fino encounter the older woman whom Raul helped while undercover who comes to Leon with them and buys an air conditioner there because the salesmen at the new store confused her with technical jargon. Lore has to install the unit but has a previous engagement. Raul volunteers his services for that job to allow Lore to take care of the air conditioner. Fino accompanies Raul to the job which is to refill the magic tank for a store whose owner does not have any magic of their own. Raul and Fino work together to fix the problem which turned out to be a magic eater, a rare creature not usually found in a city. After they fix the problem, they get a call from Lore that means trouble.
7	"The Demon Lord's Daughter Visits a House"; Transliteration: "Maō no Musume-san ga Ippan Katei ni o Jama Suru yō Desu" (Japanese: 魔王の娘さんが一般家庭にお邪魔するようです。)	Yasuhito Nishikata	November 16, 2013
Fino and Raul arrive to find that the old woman's son went to Amada and bought a unit too. Because the Leon unit is more expensive, the son wants to install the unit he bought and they are about to leave but stop when the son flags them down. The new A/C is unable to run because of low magic. The Amada rep states that the house may need to be rewired - a prohibitively expensive solution to the problem. As he is on a schedule, the rep leaves allowing Lore and the others time to investigate the reason for the low power. Everything seems to be in order leading Raul and Fino to realize that there must be magic eater here too. With considerable effort they are able to remove the magic eater infestation (there were tens if not hundreds of them in the house) and are about to leave when the son has a change of heart. Given their level of customer service, not to mention having saved him the cost of needlessly rewiring the house, he has chosen to install the A/C from Leon despite the penalties it will cost to return the other unit. That evening, after a bath, everyone celebrates a job well done and Raul takes an inebriated Fino home to their apartment building as a heat wave envelops the city. The following morning he wakes up to find Fino in his bed. After clearing up the misunderstanding (she came to his room because it was cooler) and having breakfast they head in to work where they find Nova passed out on the floor.
8	"The Demon Lord's Daughter Is Tending to Customers in a Swimsuit"; Transliteration: "Maō no Musume-san ga Mizugi de Okyaku-san o Omukae Suru yō Desu" (Japanese: 魔王の娘さんが水着でお客さんをお迎えするようです。)	Daisuke Tsukushi	November 23, 2013
Nova has collapsed due to heat exhaustion since the store's A/C has broken down. The Leon head office has sent a shipment of summer goods, but, due to the heat wave, customers are staying home. Fino, leaking magic because of the heat, sets off a box of fireworks and scorches her clothes. Since Nova has sent the spare uniforms to be cleaned Seara gets the idea to sell items outside with bathing suits on. She even gets Liza and Lamdimia to help out. Predictably, this catches the attention of male passersby and the sale of summer goods skyrockets. To increase the sales of other items, such as cameras, Lamdimia proposes that customers can test out their new cameras by taking photos of the bikini-clad staff. Later Airi, with the permission of Amada management, arrives to check out what is going on and ends up helping out in a bikini as well. The day ends with the arrival of the A/C customer from the other day, who happens to be a reporter for the Capital Economic Times and wants to write an article about Leon and their hard-working staff.
9	"How the Demon Lord's Daughter Spent Her First Paycheck"; Transliteration: "Maō no Musume-san ga Moratta Shonin Kyū no Yūkō Katsuyō Nitsuite" (Japanese: 魔王の娘さんが貰った初任給の有効活用について。)	Tetsuya Endō	November 30, 2013
Payday has arrived and Fino is given her first pay check. Seara suggests that Raul escort her as she goes shopping for the first time. Fino is nervous about the experience but after she gets through the first few transactions, she gets the hang of things. She buys a number of items including a dress and a thank you gift for Raul but ends up spending the entirety of her paycheck. She is proud of her math until Raul points out that she now has nothing to live off of until next pay day. On their way home, while Raul stops to buy drinks, Fino is attacked. She states that the attackers want her to become the next demon lord and so open up the hero business again.
10	"I Wanted to Be a Hero, but She Didn't Want to Be the Demon Lord"; Transliteration: "Yūsha ni Naritakatta Ore to Maō ni Naritakunakatta Aitsu" (Japanese: 勇者になりたかった俺と魔王になりたくなかったあいつ。)	Sei Nanbe	December 7, 2013
Fino has been acting a little out of character since the attack in the last episode, and Raul is worried about her. When he presses Fino on the issue, she tells him that she has decided to work harder so that she can become the manager of the Leon store that she intends to open in the demon world. Raul has lunch with his former classmates and, based on their saying that the hero program is going to be reinstated, figures out that they were the ones who assaulted Fino. Lamdimia meets with a demon named Raid who also wants Fino to become the next demon lord and he has the Bloodstone amulet to ensure it. Later Fino is kidnapped and it is revealed that Amada, with plans to reopen weapon and armour shops, is working with Raid and Blaze in this matter. That night, at the hero prep school where she is being held captive, Fino refuses Raid's plea that she take up her father's throne. When Blaze shows up he reveals the motivation for his participation in her kidnapping and then shocks her by revealing that Raul and Airi were heroes in training.
11	"I Couldn't Become a Hero, but now I'm Going to Rescue the Demon Lord's Daughter"; Transliteration: "Yūsha ni Narenakatta Ore ga Maō no Musume-san o Tasuke ni Ikimasu" (Japanese: 勇者になれなかった俺が魔王の娘さんを助けに行きます。)	Yoshio Tanaka	December 14, 2013
Raul Chaser finds out where Fino is taken and goes to rescue her at the old Heroes Academy. Once there he faces Blaze and defeats him using only a ruler. As he tries to rescue Fino, Airi interrupts and states that she will kill Fino because demons killed her family. Raul and Airi duel it out ending in a tie when both are knocked out. Fino, feeling distraught starts crying and the royal bloodstone reacts with her. She flies off towards the demon world seemingly reborn as the new demon king.
12	"I Couldn't Become a Hero, so I Decided to Get a Job"; Transliteration: "Yūsha ni Narenakatta Ore wa Shūshoku o Ketsui Shimashita" (Japanese: 勇者になれなかった俺は就職を決意しました。)	Kōichirō Kuroda; Hideki Hiroshima	December 21, 2013
Raul, Lami-san, Lore-Senpai, Airi and the old man that come in to buy light globes sets off after Fino. As they go towards the mountain they start getting separated. At the end Raul faces Fino in a battle. After some time trying to convince Fino she reverts to her old self destroying the Bloodstone amulet. At the end of the episode The Leon Magic Shop gains an extra member, Airi, and Fino was told to show her the ropes.
13 (OVA)	"My Sister Came to the Capital to See Me, Her Brother Who Couldn't Become a Hero"; Transliteration: "Yūsha ni Narenakatta Ore no Imōto ga Jōkyō Shite Kimashita" (Japanese: 勇者になれなかった俺の妹が上京してきました。)	Shinsuke Yanagi; Yoshihide Yūzumi	March 9, 2014
This OVA stars all the original characters. Raul's Sister has come all the way from Raul's home village to see her brother who has "become a hero". Raul and his fellow co-workers think it is a better idea to trick his sister to thinking Raul is a real hero.
