= Fragtime =

Japanese manga series

- Cover of Fragtime volume 1 by Akita Shoten

フラグタイム (Furagutaimu)
- Genre: Yuri, time stoppage
- Manga
- Written by: Sato
- Published by: Akita Shoten
- English publisher: NA: Seven Seas Entertainment
- Magazine: Manga Cross
- Original run: 2013 – 2014
- Volumes: 2
- Original video animation
- Directed by: Takuya Satō
- Produced by: Yuusuke Terada; Keisuke Satou; Masayo Kudou; Masahito Nakatomi; Akiko Sugawara
- Written by: Takuya Satō
- Music by: Rionos
- Studio: Tear Studio; East Fish Studio
- Licensed by: NA: Sentai Filmworks
- Released: November 22, 2019
- Runtime: 60 minutes

Fragtime (Japanese: フラグタイム, Hepburn: Furagutaimu) is a Japanese yuri manga series by Sato. It was serialized online via Akita Shoten's Manga Cross website between 2013 and 2014. It was collected in two tankōbon volumes. The manga is licensed in North America by Seven Seas Entertainment. An original video animation adaptation by Tear Studio and East Fish Studio was released on November 22, 2019, in Japan.

== Plot ==
Quiet and shy high school student Misuzu Moritani possesses the unique ability to stop time for three minutes each day. One day, her classmate Yukari Kobayashi approaches her about joining a club. Intrigued, Moritani uses her power to stop time and runs to the courtyard to catch a glimpse of Haruka Murakami, the popular girl at school. To her surprise, Moritani discovers that Murakami is unaffected by her time-stopping ability.

The next day, Moritani stops time once again and takes Murakami out of the classroom. In the hallway, Murakami confesses her feelings for Moritani and asks her out on a date. They meet up on Sunday, and during their outing, Murakami reveals that her boyfriend, Tamaki, cheated on her. Angry, Moritani encourages Murakami to take revenge by humiliating Tamaki in a lingerie store.

In the following days, Moritani continues to use her time-stopping ability to uncover secrets at school. During one of these instances, Murakami places Moritani's hand on her chest and expresses her feelings. Moritani realizes she wants Murakami all to herself. However, when she repeatedly stops time, Murakami confronts her, feeling a growing distance between them.

After a few days without using her power, Moritani finds herself in the school's sickbay, where Murakami visits her. In a bold move, Moritani kisses Murakami as time stands still. They decide to start dating and agree to spend their time alone together. Reflecting in the washroom, Moritani acknowledges her own loneliness and realizes that Murakami may experience similar feelings.

During a test, Moritani freezes time again, and Murakami undresses on her desk, encouraging Moritani to do as she pleases. They share an intimate moment, but when Moritani asks Murakami to put her clothes back on before time resumes, Murakami appears disappointed.

The next day, Moritani's classmate, Kobayashi, notices that Moritani hasn't disappeared while talking to her and expresses relief. They eat together with their friends, and the conversation turns to Murakami. Moritani observes Murakami, realizing that she seems lonely.

At the end of the school day, Moritani stops time again and tells Murakami that she seems troubled. Murakami doesn't want to talk about it. The following day, Kobayashi takes Moritani outside for fresh air, and they discuss their career choices. Moritani overhears classmates mocking Kobayashi's career aspiration and intervenes by stopping time and taking Kobayashi's survey answers.

Murakami discovers Moritani's broken promise and confronts her. In an effort to prove her sincerity, Moritani reveals that she is wearing the same underwear as Murakami. Murakami reciprocates, and they run away together as their schoolmates watch.

The next day, rumors circulate about Murakami flashing Moritani, but the students don't know the intended recipient of the gesture. Outside, Kobayashi thanks Moritani for retrieving her survey and unknowingly becomes a confidante for Moritani's relationship with Murakami.

At the lockers, Moritani stops time and tells Murakami that she has something important to share. Murakami runs away before Moritani can explain that her powers are fading. However, Murakami suggests that while Moritani still has her powers, they can use them to help their classmates.

Moritani doesn't understand Murakami's intentions, but Murakami reveals that she has always played different roles to please others. She encourages Moritani to discover the real her. Murakami reads from her flipbook, sharing her desire to be liked by everyone and her fear of being disliked. Moritani feels disheartened, believing that Murakami cannot truly love anyone.

To prevent Murakami from running away, Moritani reveals their relationship in front of the entire class, causing Murakami to flee. Moritani pursues her and confronts her about the mask she wears. Murakami charges at Moritani, insisting that she doesn't know the real her. Moritani responds by asserting that the flipbook descriptions of both of them are inaccurate. She declares her love for Murakami and expresses gratitude for reaching out to her.

Months later, Moritani's powers have disappeared, but she has become more outgoing. She finds solace in the fact that Murakami is by her side, and they continue their relationship together.

== Characters ==
Misuzu Moritani (森谷 美鈴, Moritani Misuzu)
Voiced by: Miku Itō (Japanese); Caitlynn French (English)
Haruka Murakami (村上 遥, Murakami Haruka)
Voiced by: Yume Miyamoto (Japanese); Genevieve Simmons (English)
Yukari Kobayashi (小林 由香利, Kobayashi Yukari)
Voiced by: Chika Anzai (Japanese); Natalie Rial (English)

== Media ==
=== Manga ===
No.	Release date	ISBN
1	March 7, 2014	978-4-253-13253-4
2	November 7, 2014	978-4-253-13254-1

=== Anime ===
An anime adaptation was announced on March 16, 2019. It was later revealed that the adaptation would be a theatrical original video animation produced by Tear Studio and East Fish Studio, with Takuya Satō as director and scriptwriter. Tomoko Sudo is designing the characters, and Rionos is composing the series' music. The OVA premiered on November 22, 2019 and released on May 13, 2020, in Blu-ray/DVD.

Sentai Filmworks acquired the series for distribution.
