= Lord of Vermilion: The Crimson King =

Japanese anime television series

- Key visual

ロード オブ ヴァーミリオン 紅蓮の王 (Rōdo obu Vāmirion Guren no Ō)
- Genre: Adventure, fantasy
- Created by: Square Enix
- Anime television series
- Directed by: Eiji Suganuma; Satoshi Takafuji (Note: Credited as Chief Director (チーフディレクター).)
- Produced by: Makoto Chiba; Shigeyuki Hirata
- Written by: Masashi Suzuki
- Music by: Shō Aratame
- Studio: Asread; Tear Studio
- Licensed by: Crunchyroll; SEA: Muse Communication
- Original network: Tokyo MX, BS11, Sun TV, TV Aichi
- Original run: July 13, 2018 – September 28, 2018
- Episodes: 12

Lord of Vermilion: The Crimson King (ロード オブ ヴァーミリオン 紅蓮の王, Rōdo obu Vāmirion Guren no Ō) is an anime adaptation of the Lord of Vermilion series by Square Enix. The series follows Chihiro Kamina, a seemingly normal college student living in Tokyo. His life turns into total chaos following the apocalyptic event known as The Great Collapse, and his hidden powers are later awakened. After encountering other people with powers like his own, Chihiro must find the will to survive and achieve his destiny as the Lord of Vermilion.

== Plot ==
Thirteen years ago, Chihiro Kamina moved in with his best friend after a disastrous accident. Present day, he is just a normal college student in Tokyo. However, on January 29, a mysterious ringing sound knocks out people across the city including him, resulting in the emergence of a mysterious red mist. Comatose victims began to awaken only a week after the incident, with Chihiro waking up almost five months after. The incident, now known as the Great Collapse, caused giant plants to appear from out of nowhere, trapping those in the red mist. When Chihiro is given a seemingly fatal wound, his life turns into total chaos and he must now fight against those with powers similar to those he has just awakened, and must find a way to protect himself and achieve his destiny.

== Characters ==
=== Malthus Church ===
Chihiro Kamina (神名 千尋, Kamina Chihiro)
Voiced by: Yuki Kaji (Japanese); Orion Pitts (English)
Chihiro has grey hair and purple eyes. When transformed, his main blood armament is a spike extending from the elbow down, taking the place of his arm. He has a massive amount of raw power, making him the most likely candidate to become the Lord of Vermilion. Thirteen years ago, his mother Mitsuki worked with Dr. Grummen and he was close friends with Grummen's daughter Yuri, but Mitsuki was swallowed by another world. His grief-stricken father then attempted to kill him. In the present day, he is in his second year at the Jokei University and one of the people who lost consciousness during the 'Dai Kyoumei' (lit. great resonance). Five months later, he wakes up from his comatose state.
Kotetsu Dōmyōji (道明寺 虎鉄, Dōmyōji Kotetsu)
Voiced by: Satoshi Hino (Japanese); Justin Briner (English)
He has black hair and grey eyes. When transformed, his main blood armament is a two-handed katana like sword. He is a close friend of Chihiro's and the two share a brotherly relationship.
Shōko Hanashima (花島 笙子, Hanashima Shōko)
Voiced by: Ai Kayano (Japanese); Lindsay Seidel (English)
She has burgundy hair and eyes and freckles across the bridge of her nose. She lives at the Malthus Church. Her blood armament is not a conventional weapon. Her blood forms into a swarm of butterflies, which she can telepathically direct to targets and detonate.
Isshin Kakihara (柿原 一心, Kakihara Isshin)
Voiced by: Hiroki Touchi (Japanese); Robert McCollum (English)
He dresses in a suit but wears the jacket draped casually around his shoulders and is almost always seen smoking. His blood armament lets him create large fists for punching. He is a freelance journalist with a special interest in Chihiro after the incident thirteen years ago when his parent were found dead.
Inuki Akaya (赤谷 犬樹, Akaya Inuki)
Voiced by: Toshiyuki Morikawa (Japanese); Eric Vale (English)
He has thick red hair and brown eyes. He is a physician at the Jokei University Hospital, which is attached to the university Chihiro attends. He tended Chihiro during the five months he was in a coma. His blood armament enhances his hands into claws.
Koume Sakiyama (咲山 小梅, Sakiyama Koume)
Voiced by: Aoi Yūki (Japanese); Monica Rial (English)
She has long black hair and purple eyes, although there is an eyepatch over her left eye. Her blood armament is a whip with a pointed tip like a devil's tail. She is a nurse at Jokei University Hospital who works with Inuki and has notoriously bad bedside manners concerning her patients.

=== AVAL Science Foundation ===
The members of this group are often known as agents of Chaos.

Yuri Shiraki (白木 優羽莉, Shiraki Yūri)
Voiced by: Misato Fukuen (Japanese); Amber Lee Connors (English)
Yuri has long black hair and dresses in a white shirt with a blue ribbon around her collar. Her blood armament are shuriken. She can also create and throw swarms of shuriken-shaped projectiles, string them together into chains, or bunch them together to make shields. She can also lengthen the arms of one into a sword. The daughter of AVAL leader Grummen, she and Chihiro played together as children and she is still in love with him.
Jun Aoi (葵 順, Aoi Jun)
Voiced by: Junichi Suwabe (Japanese); Ian Sinclair (English)
He wears a leather jacket and sunglasses, giving off the impression of a biker. He is actually the leader of the Blue Skull biker gang. His blood armament are a pair of massive clawed hands that grow from his back which he can manipulate. He and Inuki were raised together in the same orphanage and share a close, brother-like relationship.
Haru Minakami (水上 晴, Minakami Haru)
Voiced by: Takuma Terashima (Japanese); Stephen Fu (English)
Haru has spiky blonde hair and wears a blue bandanna over his forehead. His blood armament allows him to generate large fists for punching and he can also condense blood in spheres to entrap and drown his opponent. He is a fan of the Blue Skulls biker gang, which Jun is a member of, leading to him allying with Jun and AVAL. He has a near fanatic loyalty to Jun.
Kaburagi Kark (カーク鏑木, Kāku Kaburagi)
Voiced by: Shin-ichiro Miki (Japanese); Daman Mills (English)
He wears a long coat, black hat, and a scarf that typically covers the lower half of his face. He also has dark hair. His blood armament is wires that form together into a massive scythe far larger than he is. He also has a female familiar named Amadeus who typically wields the scythe. He is able to do a Spell of Binding, using his music to draw on the grief and guilt his opponents feel to paralyze them, this was especially effective against Chihiro. A famous pianist, he tells his opponents he will play a requiem for them and refers to himself as a Shinigami (God of Death). He enjoys seeing despair on his opponents' faces.
Chiyu (チユ, Chiyu)
Voiced by: Chiwa Saitō (Japanese); Sarah Wiedenheft (English)
She has short black hair and wears an outfit reminiscent of a maid. Her blood armament lets her fire electrified blood bullets and create shields. She is an artificial human created by using Professor Mitsuki and Grummen's DNA, making her a substitute for Mitsuki. She is extremely intelligent with an air of quiet smugness. She considered Koume a defective life.

=== Guardian State ===
Marie Kurokami (黒髪 マリエ, Kurokami Marie)
Voiced by: Yū Kobayashi (Japanese); Katelyn Barr (English)
She is a policewoman with long straight black hair that reaches her thighs and always carries a pistol. She has a winged lion familiar named Pluto. Her blood armament is a large lance.
Tsubaki Manazuru (真鶴 椿, Manazuru Tsubaki)
Voiced by: Rie Kugimiya (Japanese); Jad Saxton (English)
She addressees herself in third person and has short black hair with a butterfly hairclip above her left ear. She has a small doll-like familiar named Densuke. Her blood armament is a pair of bladed tonfa but she can also shoot an energy beam.
Akira Harabuki (原吹 晶, Harabuki Akira)
Voiced by: Rina Satō (Japanese); Madeleine Morris (English)
She has short black hair and was a friend of Haru's before he joined AVAL. Akira can release explosive waves of blood. Her familiar Elsbernd has the ability to shapeshift and made himself look like Chihiro during the assault on the Infinity Theater.
Julia Ichijō (一条 樹理亜, Ichijō Juria)
Voiced by: Yui Horie (Japanese); Tia Ballard (English)
She has long blonde hair and blue-green eyes. She has an angel-like familiar named Gabriel with six wings. Her blood armament is a bow. She can release an arrow into the air and have it break apart into dozens of arrows that strike a single target multiple times.
Suruga Jūmonji (十文字 駿河, Jūmonji Suruga)
Voiced by: Akira Ishida (Japanese); Howard Wang (English)
He has short blonde hair and blue eyes. He has a familiar reminiscent of a lizard with Aztec markings named Lia Fail. His blood armament is a spear.

=== Secondary characters ===
Dux (ドゥクス, Dukusu)
Voiced by: Sayuri Inoue (Japanese); Dani Chambers (English)
Dux is the leader of the Malthus Church, a being of unknown origin. She appears to want to protect the world, though her actions are vindictive. She enjoys watching the Heroes fight against fate as the timeline is repeated and they continually die. She carries a red umbrella and wears a gold mask that hides her eyes. She has the ability to enter dreams and teleport.
Van Drail (バン・ドレイル, Ban Doreiru)
Voiced by: Nobuyuki Hiyama (Japanese); Christopher Wehkamp (English)
Drail is the adviser to Grummen. He wears dark purple, is full of tattoos and piercings and is always standing in the shadows. He never enters combat but has the ability to teleport and enjoys watching destruction. He manipulated Grummen into creating AVAL so he could watch more destruction.
Aldo Grummen Shiraki (白木・アルド・グラマン, Shiraki Arudo Guraman)
Voiced by: Show Hayami (Japanese); Kent Williams (English)
He is the leader of AVAL and the father of Yuri. He is in love with Chihiro's mother Mitsuki, having worked with her thirteen years ago to create a gate to another world. After she was absorbed into said world, he set everything that happens into motion to bring her back.
Mitsuki Kamina (神名 三月, Kamina Mitsuki)
She was not voiced in the anime.
She was the mother of Chihiro Kamina and an associate of Dr. Grummen. They worked together on making a gate to another world but an explosion led to Mitsuki being swallowed by the gate, which became the trigger for Grummen creating AVAL. Her son Chihiro often played with Grummen's daughter Yuri before this occurrence and she would make them hot chocolate. Her son and husband outlived her. Grummen used her and his DNA to create Chiyu. It has been implied she loved Grummen and that she did not, it is not confirmed either way.
Tsubasa Tachikaze (立風 つばさ, Tachikaze Tsubasa)
Voiced by: Hisako Tōjō (Japanese); Amanda Lee (English)
As Tsubasa, she has short brown hair and eyes, but in her true form of Aero her hair turns green and her arms become feathery wings. She is a photographer journalist who follows Isshin Kakihara and takes pictures for him. However, she becomes a harpy-like familiar bound to Kakihara after the Great Resonance. She can manipulate wind into offensive blades. Aero does not know what happened to Tsubasa's mind after she awoke.
Eiko Morizono (森園 英子, Morizono Eiko)
Voiced by: Tomoko Nakamura (Japanese); Skyler McIntosh (English)
In her human form, she has brown hair tied back in the braid and brown eyes. In her true form of Cerdid she has long blonde hair tied back in two ponytails and pointed elven ears. She poses as a second-year student at Jokei University in the same seminar as Chihiro but in actuality, she is Cerdid, a Defender assigned to Chihiro. She is capable of healing.
Ikurō Owari (尾張 郁郎, Owari Ikurō)
Voiced by: Shun'ichi Toki (Japanese); Dallas Reid (English)
Ikurō is a friend of Chihiro and Kotetsu, attending the same university as them. He is turned into a partial familiar early on in the series and remains in a coma for the rest as Inuki and later Koume tries to find a way to return him to fully human. His fate is a great source of pain for Chihiro, who believes Ikurō was harmed because he was close to him.
Yato Kazama (風間 夜刀, Kazama Yato)
Voiced by: Takahiro Imamura (Japanese); Alejandro Saab (English)
Yato lives in the Dōmyōji dojo and helps out there. He is attacked when Kotetsu's father turns into a monster and wounded but survives. He denies remembering anything, blocking the memory. He is not seen again. He has wavy brown hair and commonly wears sunglasses, dressing casually in a T-shirt and cargo shorts.
Rakan Dōmyōji (道明寺 羅漢, Dōmyōji Rakan)
Voiced by: Motoi Koyanagi (Japanese); R. Bruce Elliott (English)
Kotetsu's father, he ran the Dōmyōji dojo until he was turned into a familiar by Jun and killed by Chihiro. Thirteen years ago, after Chihiro's parents died, Rakan became his legal guardian and he has been living in the dojo since.

== Anime ==
A 12-episode anime television series adaptation of the arcade game was directed by Eiji Suganuma at Asread and Tear Studio. Masashi Suzuki is a series composer, and Toshie Kawahara was in charge of the character designs. The series aired from July 13 to September 28, 2018. Crunchyroll streamed the series with subtitles, while Funimation made an English dub. The opening theme is Tenshi yo Kokyou o Kike (天使よ故郷を聞け) by May'n while the ending theme is Akaku, Zetsubou no Hana (紅く、絶望の花) by JUNNA. Muse Communication licensed the series in South and Southeast Asia.

No.	Title	Original release date
1	"Our Lives Are the Debt We Pay Our Enemies" "Waga Inochi wa Teki ni Harau Shakkin ka" (我が命は敵に払う借金か)	July 13, 2018
On the night of a red moon, a group of people systematically kill each other in a battle royale using weapons formed from their blood. Chihiro Kamina and Yuri Shiraki are the last two standing, lamenting that they cannot escape fate as they kill each other. In the present, Chihiro wins a kendo sparring match with his childhood friend Kotetsu Dōmyōji. While the two attend Jokei University, a mysterious sound resonates caused by Yuri, causing everyone in Tokyo to fall unconscious from extreme pain as a mysterious red mist emerges citywide. While unconscious, Chihiro speaks to a masked girl named Dux in his bizarre dream. She states that this heroic scene will be repeated countless times. When Chihiro wakes up in the campus hospital, medical staff workers Inuki Akaya and Koume Sakiyama tell him that five months have passed. The event that occurred is now called "The Great Collapse", in which a giant plant has sprouted all over the city and the red mist still remains. After Chihiro leaves the hospital with Kotetsu, they are stopped by freelance journalist Isshin Kakihara and his aide Tsubasa Tachikaze, as Chihiro is insinuated by Kakihara concerning an event thirteen years ago that may have been the cause for the Great Collapse. As Chihiro dozes off on his way home, he dreams that Kotetsu's father Rakan Dōmyōji was murdered and the front of the dojo was wrecked. When Chihiro and Kotetsu return to the dojo, they hear a similar mysterious sound resonating, which they see is caused by Jun Aoi, who is snapping his fingers. Yuri appears with Jun to watch. Rakan, who is now a four-armed Troll familiar, bursts through and destroys the front of the dojo. Chihiro hesitates to harm Rakan and ends up nearly bisected from left shoulder to waist with Rakan's sword. This fatal wound awakens his Heroic Blood, turning his eyes red when they open.
2	"You Don't Know Who I Am Yet" "Kimi wa Mada, Boku to iu Ningen o Shiranai Noda" (君はまだ、ぼくという人間を知らないのだ)	July 20, 2018
Chihiro's Heroic Blood forms into a spike blood armament, allowing Chihiro to easily kill Rakan as the Troll familiar. After Yuri and Jun leave, Chihiro is healed back to normal but is stricken with grief over what he did to Rakan. Eiko Morizono, who watched from the sidelines, arrives to use her abilities to put Chihiro to sleep. After Rakan's Troll familiar form dissolves into the red mist, policewoman Marie Kurokami arrives on the scene and asks witness Yato Kazama what happened at the dojo, but Yato denies remembering anything and claims that he lost consciousness when he was attacked. Marie then informs Kotetsu and Eiko about a rumor concerning numerous people becoming the red mist after vanishing. There are also reports of humans turning into monstrous beasts, though it may be an urban legend. Eiko later tells Kotetsu that Rakan was turned into a familiar by Jun. When Chihiro wakes up, Eiko advises that he rest since he used up so much power in the recent fight. Chihiro, Kotetsu and Eiko return to Jokei University the next day. Inuki and Koume arrive and sedate a student having a seizure, preparing to take him to the campus hospital. During lunchtime, Eiko tells Chihiro and Kotetsu that the student could have changed into a familiar if a gate from another world opened. Coming out of the bathroom, Chihiro hears the resonating sound coming from Yuri ringing a stick with two bells, which pains him. Meanwhile, Kakihara and Tsubasa confront a college staff member involving the college donations and the AVAL Science Foundation. Yuri lures Chihiro to a classroom with three other students including his friend Ikurō Owari, who all begin transforming into familiars when Yuri rings her bells. Jun states that they have the order of death to the Heroic Lineage. When Kotetsu and Eiko find Chihiro there, the other students except Ikurō fully transform, while Kotetsu is badly affected by the ringing sound and drops to his knees. As Eiko pleads with a hesitant Chihiro to awaken his Heroic Blood, Kotetsu awakens his Heroic Blood instead and seeks revenge on Jun. Chihiro holds back from awakening his Heroic Blood, but cries out in fear after Kotetsu is overpowered by a winged Diabolos familiar.
3	"Who Set Fire to an Old Conflict?" "Dare da, Furui Arasoi ni Arata ni Hi o Tuketa noha?" (だれだ、古い争いに新たに火をつけたのは?)	July 27, 2018
Chihiro awakens his Heroic Blood and calls out Eiko's true elf form Cerdid, who tends to a troubled Kotetsu while Chihiro kills the Diabolos familiar. Kakihara and Tsubasa snap pictures of the fight, claiming this to be a huge scoop. Jun and Yuri approach with two more Diabolos familiars, causing an enraged Chihiro to go berserk. Tsubasa is pained by Chihiro's energy and her body begins to transform. Shōko Hanashima arrives and tell Kakihara to awaken his Heroic Blood. Kakihara calls out Tsubasa's true harpy form Aero, who destroys one Diabolos familiar, while Chihiro destroys the other. Chihiro attempts to attack Jun, but Yuri intervenes, which wrenches Chihiro from his berserk state. After Yuri and Jun leave, Shōko reverts Chihiro back to normal. Ikurō, who is still partially a familiar, is taken into custody by Inuki and Koume. Shōko takes Chihiro, Kotetsu and Kakihara to the Malthus Church, explaining it is the stronghold for the Heroic Lineage who fight against Chaos. Dux, the leader of the Heroic Lineage, tells them that the world will be destroyed in forty years, and a new world will begin. However, it will be ruled by either hope or despair, depending on which side will win. Shōko confirms that Chaos caused the Great Collapse, using Tokyo as a hunting ground to prevent the Heroic Lineage from destroying the world. Dux tells the Vessels of Heroic Blood that destroying Tokyo will close the gate and prevent new familiars from coming. At the campus hospital, Cerdid and Aero return to human forms, while Ikurō is comatose in his partial familiar form. Inuki explains that all humans have the Arcana gene just like creatures from different worlds, which has resulted in gates opening and creatures crossing over. Chihiro has a vision of Dux, who tells him it is all his fault. The only way he can seek salvation, though his hands stained with blood, is if he can save the world from despair and win against Chaos.
4	"Why Do I Love My Despised Enemy" "Nikurashī Teki ga Naze ni Shitawashī" (憎らしい敵がなぜに慕わしい)	August 3, 2018
Chihiro uses his overpower to unleash energy, managing to raze two barriers hidden in Tokyo. Soon after at the Malthus Church, Shōko tells Chihiro, Kotetsu, Inuki and Koume that the gates will no longer be able to become open if the barriers are destroyed. While an ill Inuki stays behind, Chihiro, Kotetsu, Koume and Cerdid cross paths with Yuri and Jun before attempting to destroy another barrier. Kotetsu confronts a Vessel named Tsubaki Manazuru, who is looking for the boss. Chihiro destroys the barrier underneath him and Yuri, bringing them into a dream world. Cerdid faints from paralysis due to Chihiro's disappearance from the world. Chihiro and Yuri discuss their opposing views on the barriers, since destroying them would stop the familiars from coming but preserving them would turn humans into familiars or dissolve them into the red mist. Yuri proposes to become allies with Chihiro so they can change the world together. As he realizes that she knows the way out of the dream world, she agrees to show him rather than leave him trapped. Koume overwhelms Jun but is stopped by Haru Minakami, another Vessel and a classmate of Chihiro and Kotetsu, allied with Jun and his Blue Skulls biker gang. As Kotetsu continues to fight Tsubaki and her doll-like Densuke, they realize that neither of them are agents of Chaos. Yuri helps Chihiro exit the dream world together using his overpower under control. Chihiro recalls childhood memories of being with Yuri. Before leaving, Yuri states that it was all because of his mother.
5	"Today's Dark Destiny Will Hang Over the Future" (今日の暗い運命は、この先ずっと垂れ込める)	August 10, 2018
Chihiro intervenes when Haru attacks Koume, prompting Jun and Haru leave with Yuri. At the Malthus Church, Shōko says Tsubaki is a member of the Guardian State, an ancient organization that has been protecting Japan before the country was officially formed. Although the Vessels of Heroic Blood believe that there was a spy involved to set up the ambush, Shōko tells them that their priority is to destroy Tokyo. Confiding in Inuki, a troubled Chihiro struggles to remember his mother during childhood. According to Kakihara, Chihiro's mother Mitsuki Kamina caused an explosion at the AVAL Science Foundation Research Facility thirteen years ago. The nature of the research never went public and Mitsuki went missing. Kakihara also accuses Chihiro of killing his parents, stating that Chihiro stabbed his father to help him remember how he killed his mother. After visiting the campus hospital, Chihiro and Kotetsu are stopped by Kurokami and Tsubaki, confirmed members of the Guardian State. Kurokami and Tsubaki suspect Jun is behind a string of grisly murders, and Kotetsu agrees to join them. After coming back to his ransacked office, Kakihara seeks information from Kurokami to track down Jun as well as warm up to Aero. While visiting Ikurō, Chihiro is told by Inuki that they can save everyone, even if Chihiro only creates despair by saving one and killing another. Koume sees the laboratory in ruins later at night, as Inuki, unable to finish his research to treat Ikurō, seemingly smashes through a window. After hearing a scream, Tsubaki finds a recent female victim, but is attacked by a red-haired Werewolf familiar and saved by Kotetsu. The Werewolf familiar flees and transforms back, revealing himself to be Inuki, who screams in horror.
6	"Bright Lights Suit A Dark Heart" "Kurai Kokoro ni wa Akarui Hikari ga Fusawashī" (暗い心には明るい光が相応しい)	August 17, 2018
Tsubaki and Kotetsu tell Kurokami that they only saw a female victim and a Werewolf familiar during their search for Jun. Inuki as the Werewolf familiar kills a few members of the Blue Skulls. Koume does not inform Chihiro about the current condition of the laboratory, saying that Inuki just stepped outside. While Chihiro looks for Inuki in the streets, Inuki in human form is found by the Blue Skulls. When Chihiro arrives, the Blue Skulls surround him, allowing Inuki to jump into the bay to avoid being seen before transforming again. Back at the Malthus Church, Kakihara reveals that Inuki is the traitor, learning that Inuki and Jun were both raised in an orphanage named Hikari-En, controlled by the AVAL Science Foundation. Koume later tells Chihiro that there is a barrier within Hikari-En, and destroying that barrier would kill the children of Hikari-En. In fact, Hikari-En was a facility used for experimental education, but the Vessels of Heroic Blood were branded as failures and discarded. However, Inuki is still suffering from the after effects of the procedures. As Chihiro visits Hikari-En, he comes across Yuri watering her rosemary garden. He asks her about his past as he sits next to her on a bench. On a bridge, Jun forgives Inuki for killing his friends. Jun pleads with Inuki to return to the AVAL Science Foundation, but Inuki refuses. As Inuki starts to lapse, Jun prepares to kill him, only to be stopped by Chihiro. Inuki fully transforms into the Werewolf familiar combining with his Heroic Blood, which gives him an enhanced claws blood armament. Jun watches as Chihiro goes berserk again against Inuki. Regaining partial control of himself, Inuki absorbs Chihiro's overpower to bring him under control. Before succumbing to death from absorbing so much overpower, Inuki promises Chihiro that his overpower can be controlled and tells him not to give in to despair.
7	"Please Join Our Hands With the Holy Words" "Dō Ka Futari no te o Seinaru Kotoba de Musunde Kudasai" (どうか二人の手を聖なる言葉で結んでください)	August 24, 2018
While Chihiro gives Koume a red stone, Dux tells Shōko that the body of Heroic Blood changes forms becoming red stones, also known as blood crystals. Chaos controls the Heroic Blood and makes them fight each other in hopes that they will destroy one another. However, only one Heroic Blood can survive and become the new Lord of Vermilion. Meanwhile, Yuri's father and leader of the AVAL Science Foundation Aldo Grummen Shiraki says that the day of the Second Great Collapse is rapidly approaching, which means that even more humans would be sacrificed. Jun encourages Yuri and Haru to focus on killing the Heroic Lineage first. They decide to start with Chihiro, whom Jun intends to give unspeakable suffering for taking Inuki from him. Yuri finds a despondent Chihiro outside Hikari-En, where she tell him that Mitsuki and Grummen worked together, while Chihiro and Yuri were there during the explosion thirteen years ago. Mitsuki was swallowed into another world when the experiment failed, and Grummen started using Tokyo to open gates as she and Chihiro became distant. Chihiro later dreams of Kotetsu dying, but Chihiro refuses to allow this and runs to find Kotetsu. While Kotetsu is on a date with Tsubaki, they are followed by Jun and Haru on their motorcycles. After confiding to Yuri about his dream, Chihiro finally finds Kotetsu and Tsubaki outside a restaurant. However, an impatient Jun kidnaps Kotetsu, while Haru handles Tsubaki. Chihiro chases after Jun, only to find Kotetsu hanging upside-down from a tree, which Chihiro saw in his dream. Jun begins to cut into Kotetsu using the massive clawed hands blood armament manipulated from his back, while preventing Chihiro from getting closer. Using her shuriken blood armament as swarms of projectiles, Yuri arrives to assist Chihiro and stands against Jun, who is forced to flee but saves Haru from being killed by Tsubaki. To repay the debt of saving Kotetsu's life, Chihiro invites Yuri to join his side.
8	"Excruciating Sadness Can Be Cured by Other Anguish" "Shinu Hodo Tsurai Kanashimi mo Betsu no Kunō de Ieru Mono" (死ぬほどつらい悲しみも別の苦悩で癒えるもの)	August 31, 2018
The members of the Malthus Church meet with the members of the Guardian State in the red mist. Both factions argue over the fate of Tokyo, until Chihiro proposes that there is way to save the world without destroying Tokyo. Chihiro says that ever since he allied with Yuri, he is certain that fate can change. As long as they are alive, they can stop Chaos's plan. However, Julia Ichijō and Suruga Jūmonji decide not to join this alliance, while Kurokami shows Kakihara some files on the murder of Chihiro's father. Thirteen years ago, a seven-year-old Chihiro was rescued by officers two weeks after he allegedly survived a double suicide with his father. Despite evidence that proved Chihiro was strangled, Chihiro's father stabbed himself with a shard of glass, even though cuts were left on Chihiro's hands. Unreleased to the public, Chihiro's father left a bloody message on the floor before he died, telling Chihiro to live. Chihiro fell into a coma and suffered amnesia. In the present, Chihiro and Yuri tell Kotetsu, Shōko, Kurokami, Tsubaki and Akira Harabuki that the AVAL Science Foundation is planning to create a Second Great Collapse. Back outside Hikaru-En, Yuri gives Chihiro a copy of The Tempest, his favorite Shakespeare's play. Chihiro remembers when his father strangled him during childhood, before having a vision of Kurokami's death. Meanwhile, Kurokami investigates an abandoned amusement park, deducing that the AVAL Science Foundation is creating artificial barriers. She is suddenly attacked by a Vessel named Kaburagi Kark, who uses his wires blood armament that form together into a massive scythe in order to defeat Kurokami. While the Malthus Church fail to contact Kurokami, she appears at the courtyard and dies after showing Kakihara a map of the artificial barriers. Grummen arrives with Jun and Haru, congratulating Yuri for doing a good job and telling her to come home. As the Malthus Church is unable to trust her, despite Chihiro's pleas, Yuri is forced to return to the AVAL Science Foundation. Grummen beats Yuri, saying he will never forgive her for betraying him.
9	"Sometimes People Become Cheerful When Faced With Death" "Shi o Mae ni Shite Hito wa Yōki ni Naru Koto ga aru to iu" (死を前にして人は陽気になることがあるという)	September 7, 2018
Chihiro has a vision of Kakihara's death. Julia and Suruga convince Akira and Tsubaki to leave the Malthus Church and rejoin the Guardian State. At the Malthus Church, Koume leaves with Kurokami's blood crystal to continue Inuki's research. Kakihara and Aero then leave to pinpoint the locations of the artificial barriers called keystones. When Kakihara notices that Chihiro was following him, Kakihara deduces that Chihiro dreamed of his death. Kakihara says that fate cannot be changed unless dreams are also changed. As Kakihara and Aero leave from Chihiro, Kakikara realizes that Chihiro's eyes changed as if he was trying to live. Later at night, Kakihara admits to Chihiro that he survived a family suicide, in which his parents drove off a cliff to solve their money problems. On the other hand, Chihiro does not care about living, though he is still searching for a reason to live. Kakihara notices that Chihiro's eyes are no longer darkened with regret and despair. Chihiro accompanies Kakihara and Aero to visit the keystone at the abandoned amusement park. Kark suddenly appears and attacks, eventually causing Chihiro to hallucinate in a binding spell, which paralyzes him from using his blood armament and causes him grief and guilt. Kakihara is wounded while trying to free Chihiro, and Aero sacrifices herself for Kakihara, ordering him to live before she dies. After Kakihara is further wounded from failing to land an attack on Kark, Chihiro calls out Cerdid, forcing Kark to fall back. Kakihara reveals that Chihiro's father returned to his senses and used the shard of glass to commit suicide, writing the word "live" on the floor with his own blood before he died as a final request to Chihiro. Realizing that he did not kill his father, Chihiro breaks free of the binding spell and restores his blood armament. Kotetsu and Tsubaki soon arrive, forcing Kark to flee. Kakihara dies shortly after forgiving Chihiro. Meanwhile, Dux warns Shōko that there will be a Second Great Collapse and Chaos will win if the last keystone is connected.
10	"My Soul Calls My Name" "Waga na o Tobu no wa, Waga Tamashī" (我が名を呼ぶのは、我が魂)	September 14, 2018
Grummen sponsors the construction of the Infinity Theater, where Kark will play a piano performance of a requiem at the opening concert, and a giant trap door is built on stage for unknown reasons. Tsubaki and Akira rejoins the alliance with the goal of stopping Chaos's plans. At the Malthus Church, Dux says that the six installed keystones almost form the Big Dipper, while Chihiro was previously told by Kakihara that the seventh one is installed at the Infinity Theater. Meanwhile, Grummen assigns Jun to defend the first six keystones over trying to kill Chihiro. This upsets Jun, while Haru begs Yuri to lure Chihiro out of hiding so Jun can finish Chihiro off. Haru gives Tsubaki a concert flyer, which the Malthus Church deduces that is how the Second Great Collapse will happen. Chihiro believes that since specific sounds will turn humans into gates, Kark needs to be defeated before he has the chance to perform. After Haru tells Jun that Chihiro is coming to the concert, Jun has the Blue Skulls dress up as security guards. However, as the Malthus Church approaches, Kark turns the Blue Skulls into familiars before stepping inside to perform for an audience. When Haru attempts to knock out Chihiro, it turns out to be Akira's shapeshifting familiar Elsbernd. The real Chihiro bursts through the ceiling of the stage, but Jun suddenly appears and attacks Chihiro ruthlessly. Kirk's requiem absorbs the audience into red mist produced by the keystone, turning them into a giant Titan familiar. Despite being stabbed by Jun, Chihiro honors Inuki's dying wish and smashes Jun's blood armament. Nonetheless, Kark uses his blood armament to impale Jun, who then turns into a blood crystal. Haru tries to avenge Jun's death, but is stopped by Akira, leading Kark to stab them both in the stomach. Chihiro controls his berserk overpower and destroys the Titan familiar before Kark escapes, while Shōko destroys the seventh keystone in the Infinity Theater. Though Grummen is distraught that all that he worked for is destroyed, he asks for his artificial human creation Chiyu for help.
11	"The Delicate Flower Bud is Both Medicine and Poison" "Kayowaki Hana no Tsubomi ni wa, Yaku mo Areba Doku mo Aru" (か弱き花の蕾には、薬もあれば毒もある)	September 21, 2018
Although Yuri is pleased that the Second Great Collapse has been averted, Grummen declares that the battle for humanity's fate begins now. Both Kark and Van Drail falsely say that Chihiro killed both Jun and Haru as well as many audience members, convincing Grummen to believe this worst-case scenario came true and leaving Yuri in shock. Later at the campus hospital, Haru and Akira are both alive, thanks to Cerdid's healing ability, though Kotetsu remarks that Shōko was heartless for leaving Haru and Akira for dead just to destroy the seventh keystone. Chiyu takes Grummen to a replica of Hikari-En in an undisclosed location of the AVAL Science Foundation. If they absorb the ley line energy at the remaining six keystones, they can forcibly open the gate, which will consequently swallow Tokyo into another world. Grummen, who strongly yearns to meet Mitsuki in the other world, tells Chiyu to begin preparations. Shōko is killed by Kark and the Malthus Church building burns down by a lit candle that was sliced off by Kark. After viewing footage of Chihiro seemingly defeating Jun, Akira and Haru in the Infinity Theater, Yuri is coerced by Grummen to stop Chihiro from becoming the Lord of Vermilion. Chihiro, Kotetsu, Cerdid, Koume and Tsubaki find Shōko's blood crystal, while Dux reveals that Chaos plans to take Tokyo to another world. With Cerdid spying nearby, Yuri meets Chihiro outside Hikari-En, where Yuri tries to believe that Chihiro has not changed. However, Chihiro admits that he was forced to kill the audience members because of Kark. After Yuri pleads that they should run away together, Chihiro begins to walk away. When Yuri dons her blood armament, Cerdid ensnares Yuri in plants. Cerdid noticed that Chihiro began treating her coldly and valued spending time with Yuri. When Chihiro begs Cerdid to stop, Yuri inadvertently kills Cerdid and flees from Chihiro. Meanwhile, Chiyu begins the process of absorbing the ley line energy, collapsing the AVAL Science Foundation headquarters while all the keystones rise to the sky. Chihiro, Kotetsu, Koume and Tsubaki then soar towards the AVAL Science Foundation headquarters.
12	"The World is Vast and Infinite" "Sekai wa Hiroku, Hateshinai" (世界は広く、果てしない)	September 28, 2018
Using the equipment designed with Mitsuki in the past, Grummen witnesses the gate to the other world opening. While Kotetsu, Koume and Tsubaki head towards the AVAL Science Foundation headquarters, Chihiro solely faces Kark, who summons Jörmungandr to fight Chihiro. Although Chihiro manages to wound Jörmungandr, Kark stabs Chihiro and plummels him to the ground. While unconscious, Chihiro is shown by Dux that he was previously killed four times, which were being slashed by Jun, being stabbed by Inuki, being strangled by Kakihara and committing a double suicide with Yuri. Dux explains that Chihiro's dreams are actually his memories from alternate timelines, serving as warnings to keep him from making the same mistakes. Though Dux is not certain as to how Chihiro is able to start over a new "play" each time, she wonders if he can change the "script" this time. Kotetsu and Tsubaki hold off numerous Diabolos familiars blocking their way, while Koume charges ahead to the headquarters. Meanwhile, Chiyu berates a selfish Grummen for manipulating the women in his life. After Chiyu says that Mitsuki never loved Grummen, he leaves in disbelief right when Koume breaks in. A curious Chiyu then begins to fight against Koume. Chihiro reawakens with the will to survive, easily defeating Jörmungandr. Kark's hands are sliced off before being killed by Chihiro. Julia and Suruga arrive to assist Kotetsu and Tsubaki against the Diabolos familiars, while Koume and Chiyu damage the machine controlling the gate, causing the gate to spiral out of control and the mansion itself to incinerate. When Grummen declares that he is coming for Mitsuki, Drail shoves Grummen into the gate to speed him along. As the closest candidate to being the Lord of Vermilion, Chihiro heads to erase the gate himself, but Yuri and Jörmungandr stand in his way. As Chihiro and Yuri charge at each other, Chihiro dodges her and kills Jörmungandr instead. A disappointed Drail leaves the area. Chihiro and Yuri approach the gate together, but he pushes her away and enters alone. Before the gate closes, he tells her to live. Yuri, Kotetsu, Tsubaki, Haru, Akira, Koume and Chiyu move into Hikari-En, searching for a way to reopen the gate and bring back Chihiro. While Julia patrols Tokyo for leftover familiars, Suruga is approached by a smiling Drail.
