= A Misanthrope Teaches a Class for Demi-Humans =

Japanese light novel series

- First light novel volume cover

人外教室の人間嫌い教師 (Jingai Kyōshitsu no Ningen-girai Kyōshi)
- Genre: Comedy drama; Slice of life
- Light novel
- Written by: Natsume Kurusu
- Illustrated by: Sai Izumi
- Published by: Media Factory
- English publisher: NA: Yen Press
- Imprint: MF Bunko J
- Original run: February 25, 2022 – March 25, 2026
- Volumes: 5
- Manga
- Written by: Natsume Kurusu
- Illustrated by: Atsu Benino
- Published by: Kadokawa Shoten
- English publisher: NA: Yen Press
- Imprint: Kadokawa Comics A
- Magazine: Monthly Shōnen Ace
- Original run: August 25, 2022 – July 26, 2025
- Volumes: 4
- Anime television series
- Directed by: Akira Iwanaga
- Produced by: Shuuhei Yamamoto; Taku Ootake; Keisuke Toshima; Ken Yagou; Yuuta Kawamura; Makoto Nagaoka
- Written by: Katsuhiko Takayama
- Music by: Makoto Miyazaki
- Studio: Asread
- Licensed by: Crunchyroll
- Original network: ANN (ABC TV, TV Asahi), AT-X
- Original run: January 11, 2026 – April 5, 2026
- Episodes: 13
- icon

A Misanthrope Teaches a Class for Demi-Humans (Japanese: 人外教室の人間嫌い教師, Hepburn: Jingai Kyōshitsu no Ningen-girai Kyōshi) is a Japanese light novel series written by Natsume Kurusu and illustrated by Sai Izumi. It was published under Media Factory's MF Bunko J imprint from February 2022 to March 2026. A manga adaptation illustrated by Atsu Benino was serialized in Kadokawa Shoten's shōnen manga magazine Monthly Shōnen Ace from August 2022 to July 2025. An anime television series adaptation produced by Asread aired from January to April 2026.

== Plot ==
Rei Hitoma, a reclusive man nearing thirty, has withdrawn from society after traumatic experiences dealing with human relationships. Seeking a quiet change of pace, he accepts a teaching position at a secluded all-girls school, only to discover that the institution's purpose is to educate demi-humans who wish to become fully human. Despite his aversion to people, Rei is tasked with instructing students who admire humans more than anyone else.

Rei's class consists of a mermaid, Kyōka Minazuki; a werewolf, Isaki Ōgami; a rabbit demi-human, Sui Usami; and a bird demi-human, Tobari Haneda. As their teacher, Rei introduces them to human behavior, emotions, and social norms while learning the reasons each student desires humanity and what they hope to achieve by becoming human.

== Characters ==
Rei Hitoma (人間 零, Hitoma Rei)
Voiced by: Toshiki Masuda (Japanese); Gerard Caster (English)
Rei Hitoma is the main character of the series; he is a teacher and a hard-core gamer. Rei hates humans because in the past when he was a teacher at a human school, he was betrayed by a student who he tried to help. Not to mention, the other teachers willingly ignored the bullying because the bully was born into a rich family that donated money to the school and set up Rei after he refused to ignore the bullying. However, Rei decided to accept these feelings to learn from them and moved forward.
Kyōka Minazuki (水月 鏡花, Minazuki Kyōka)
Voiced by: Sora Amamiya (Japanese); Kelly Greenshield (English)
A mermaid demihuman who was in Rei's class but eventually ended up graduating from the academy and became a full fledged human.
Isaki Ōgami (尾々守 一咲, Ōgami Isaki)
Voiced by: Saori Ōnishi (Japanese); Veronica Laux (English)
A wolf demihuman who dealt with some insecurities before overcoming them with Rei's help. It is revealed later on that she has a split personality that she switches places with during a full moon, Isaki came to terms with her other self and fully accepted her. Both of them later graduated from the academy and became full fledged humans.
Sui Usami (右左美 彗, Usami Sui)
Voiced by: Maria Naganawa (Japanese); Emily Neves (English)
A rabbit demihuman who used to be a rabbit plushie, who wanted to become a human again to reunite with her owner. Rei helped her sneak out of the academy to meet her owner, who had aged into an elderly woman and learned that she had only a month left to live, and she happily reunited with her and promised to take care of her daughter. Sui eventually graduated and went to meet her owner's daughter.
Tobari Haneda (羽根田 トバリ, Haneda Tobari)
Voiced by: Rui Tanabe (Japanese); Kristen McGuire (English)
A harpy demihuman who got Rei to open up for the first time in the series. Her true identity is the director of the academy, and her true form is that of the Phoenix, the strongest monster in existence. Only a select few are aware of her true identity, including Rei.
Karin Ryuzaki (龍崎カリン, Ryuzaki Karin)
Voiced by: Manami Numakura
A dragon demihuman that joined Rei's class after Kyouka graduated and became infatuated with him. She attempts to seduce Rei every now and again but fails due to Rei stopping her because they are teacher and student.
Machi Nezu (根津万智, Nezu Machi)
Voiced by: Misato Fukuen
A mouse demihuman who joined Rei's class after Kyouka graduated, she desires to become a human to eat all types of food.
Neneko Kurosawa (黒澤寧々子, Kurosawa Neneko)
Voiced by: Reina Ueda
A cat demihuman who joined Rei's class after Kyouka graduated, she is shown to be a impressive painter. Later on, she revealed to her masters Alice, Medea, and Rei that she desired to be a permanent cat as she didn't want to be human. Her master granted Neneko's wish, and she became a permanent cat and was Rei's only student who did not become human.
Aoi Wakaba (若葉葵, Wakaba Aoi)
Voiced by: Yui Ishikawa
An elf demihuman who is known as a prince due to her beauty and desires to become a human to show off her beauty in the human world.
Maki Okonogi (小此鬼マキ, Okonogi Maki)
Voiced by: Yui Horie
An oni demihuman who is an extremely truthful liar, as she tells the truth as quickly as she lies. It is revealed later on that she is capable of telling when someone is lying.
Mirai Haruna (春名未来, Haruna Mirai)
Voiced by: Honoka Inoue
A human who became Rei's assistant teacher, it is revealed later on that she was the reason for Rei's trauma and his hatred for humans. In the past, Haruna was Rei's student who regularly hung out with him, as she felt most comfortable around him. But one day her friend and classmate Akazawa started bullying her; she confided to Rei about this, who decided to tell the school faculty about this. The teachers willingly ignored the bullying due to Akazawa's family donating money to the school and framed Rei for abusing Haruna. She ended up lying to the principal about this, and as a result Rei was fired, while Haruna blamed him for ruining her life. When they met again years later, Haruna admitted that she wanted to hurt him as she hoped he would hate her as she felt like she deserved to be punished, but he never did. In the end, Rei forgives her and reveals that he already overcame this, and as a result Haruna decides to become a great teacher like him.
Shirō Karasuma (烏丸四郎, Karasuma Shirō)
Voiced by: Kazuhiko Inoue (Japanese); Mark Stoddard (English)
The principal of the academy who can change his form to disguise himself, he is one of the few that knows Tobari Haneda is a actually the director of the academy. He is a crow-tengu who can foresee parts of the future and foresaw that Rei would become an invaluable teacher at the academy.
Satoru Hoshino (星野 悟, Hoshino Satoru)
Voiced by: Makoto Ishii (Japanese); Ethan Gallardo (English)
One of the faculty members of the academy who befriended Rei, he is later revealed to be Yuki Saotome's husband.
Yuki Saotome (早乙女 雪, Saotome Yuki)
Voiced by: Ai Kayano (Japanese); Molly Zhang (English)
She is a science teacher of the academy and is later revealed to be a Yuki-onna (a snow spirit) who is also revealed to be Satoru Hoshino's wife.

== Media ==
=== Light novel ===
Written by Natsume Kurusu and illustrated by Sai Izumi, A Misanthrope Teaches a Class for Demi-Humans was published in five volumes under Media Factory's MF Bunko J light novel imprint from February 25, 2022, to March 25, 2026. The series is licensed in English by Yen Press.

No.	Title	Original release date	North American release date
1	Mr. Hitoma, Won't You Teach Us About Humans...? Hitoma-sensei, Watashi-tachi ni Ningen o Oshiete Kuremasu ka......? (ヒトマ先生、私たちに人間を教えてくれますか......?)	February 25, 2022; 978-4-04-681095-3	October 31, 2023; 978-1-9753-7105-0
1. Prologue; 2. "The Misanthrope and the Classroom of Destiny"; 3. "The Misanthrope and the Crown of Foam"; 4. "The Misanthrope and the Lonely Castle on a Full Moon's Night"; 5. "The Misanthrope and the Summer Vacation by the River"; 6. "The Misanthrope and the Angel's Comet"; 7. "The Misanthrope and Tobari's Hymn"; 8. "The Misanthrope and the Light of Dawn"; 9. "The Misanthrope and the Long-Awaited Graduation Ceremony"; 10. Epilogue
2	Mr. Hitoma, Won't You Show Us the Light of Hope...? Hitoma sensei, Watashi-tachi no Kibō o Mitsukete Kuremasu ka......? (ヒトマ先生、私たちの希望を見つけてくれますか......?)	August 25, 2022; 978-4-04-681579-8	March 19, 2024; 978-1-9753-7107-4
1. Prologue; 2. "The Misanthrope and the Love Fortune of the Barren Flower"; 3. "The Misanthrope and the Gluttonous Hero"; 4. "The Misanthrope and the Blossom's Morrow"; 5. "The Misanthrope and the Summer Vacation in the Forest"; 6. "The Misanthrope and the Magic for Peace and Quiet"; 7. "The Misanthrope and Tobari from Days Gone By"; 8. "The Misanthrope and the Heart's True Desire"; 9. "The Misanthrope and the Comet's Pilgrimage"; 10. "The Misanthrope and the Heartfelt Graduation Ceremony"; 11. Epilogue
3	Mr. Hitoma, Will You Walk with Us Toward the Future...? Hitoma-sensei, Watashi-tachi to Mirai ni Susunde Kuremasu ka......? (ヒトマ先生、私たちと未来に進んでくれますか......?)	March 25, 2024; 978-4-04-681580-4	April 14, 2026; 979-8-8554-1080-8
1. Prologue; 2. "The Misanthrope and the Desktop Hollyhock"; 3. "The Misanthrope and the Gleeful Glutton"; 4. "The Misanthrope and the Flurry of Barren Flowers"; 5. "The Misanthrope and the Midsummer Sports Festival"; 6. "The Misanthrope and the Ceaseless Comet"; 7. "The Misanthrope and the Falsehood Found Nigh"; 8. "The Misanthrope and the Tranquil Tobari"; 9. "The Misanthrope and the Self-Sacrificing Flower"; 10. "The Misanthrope and the Nigh Future"; 11. "The Misanthrope and the Promised Graduation Ceremony"; 12. Epilogue
4	Mr. Hitoma, Will You Help Us Achieve Our Dreams…? Hitoma-sensei, Watashi-tachi no Risō o Todokete Kuremasu ka......? (ヒトマ先生、私たちの理想を届けてくれますか......?)	February 25, 2025; 978-4-04-684560-3	February 9, 2027; 979-8-8554-2791-2
5	Mr. Hitoma, Can You Teach Me About Humans...? Hitoma-sensei, Watashi ni Ningen o Oshiete kuremasu ka......? (ヒトマ先生、私に人間を教えてくれますか......?)	March 25, 2026; 978-4-04-684561-0	—

=== Manga ===
A manga adaptation illustrated by Atsu Benino was serialized in Kadokawa Shoten's shōnen manga magazine Monthly Shōnen Ace from August 25, 2022, to July 26, 2025. The manga's chapters were compiled into four tankōbon volumes released from March 25, 2023, to September 26, 2025.

On February 7, 2025, Yen Press announced that they had also licensed the manga for English publication, with the first volume releasing in July.

No.	Original release date	Original ISBN	North American release date	North American ISBN
1	March 25, 2023	978-4-04-113232-6	July 22, 2025	979-8-8554-1240-6
Chapters 1–5
2	November 25, 2023	978-4-04-114359-9	December 16, 2025	979-8-8554-1242-0
Chapters 6–12
3	July 25, 2024	978-4-04-115180-8	June 23, 2026	979-8-8554-2309-9
Chapters 13–19; Bonus 1
4	September 26, 2025	978-4-04-116407-5	January 26, 2027	979-8-8554-3861-1

=== Anime ===
An anime television series adaptation was announced on September 7, 2025. It is produced by Asread and directed by Akira Iwanaga, with series composition by Katsuhiko Takayama, characters designed by Maiko Okada, and music composed by Makoto Miyazaki. The series aired from January 11 to April 5, 2026, on the Animazing!!! programming block on all ANN affiliates, including ABC Television and TV Asahi, as well as AT-X. (Note: ABC TV and TV Asahi listed the series premiere on January 10 at 26:00, which is effectively January 11 at 2:00 a.m. JST, though AT-X has the earliest release at 12:00 m.n. at same date.) The opening theme song is "Ningen" (ニンゲン; Human), performed by Masayoshi Ōishi, while the ending theme song is "Ningen Come True!" (人間カムトゥルー！, Ningen Kamu Turū!) performed by Sora Amamiya, Saori Ōnishi, Maria Naganawa, and Rui Tanabe as their respective characters. Crunchyroll is streaming the series.

==== Episodes ====
No.	Title	Directed by	Written by	Storyboarded by	Original release date
1	"The Misanthrope and the Fateful Classroom"; Transliteration: "Ningen-girai to Kaigō no Kyōshitsu" (Japanese: 人間嫌いと邂逅の教室)	Kaito Asakura	Katsuhiko Takayama	Kaito Asakura	January 11, 2026
Fed up with society, misanthrope Rei Hitoma begins teaching at Shiranui Girls Academy in the mountains. Math teacher Hoshino, science teacher Saotome and Principal Karasuma explain Shiranui is actually a school for demi-humans planning to become human. As such the academy needed a human teacher to prepare them for human society. The academy operates on a points system where acting human is rewarded with points and only those with enough points are allowed to graduate and become human. His class consists of Bird-girl Haneda who wants to be a human musician, Rabbit-girl Usami who wants to repay a human who was kind to her, Mermaid Minazuki who wants to gain legs and become a dancer, and Werewolf Ohgami who doesn't like having a wolf personality and wants to stay human permanently. Hitoma explains he hates humans who are mostly selfish liars, but the girls insist there is a lot to admire about humans. The girls decide to have lunch with Hitoma but Minazuki panics when the lunch contains fish, and Hitoma almost chokes trying to eat it as quickly as possible, but the girls praise him for being considerate of Minazuki's phobia.
2	"The Misanthrope and the Fleeting Crown of Bubbles"; Transliteration: "Ningen-girai to Utakata no Kakan" (Japanese: 人間嫌いと泡沫の花冠)	Toshiteru Masamoto	Katsuhiko Takayama	Kaito Asakura	January 18, 2026
Hitoma is given a magic ring and warned not to take it off or the spell will erase his memories of demi-humans until he puts it on again. The girls are happy as it is the one day a week the school serves demi-human food instead of human food. During gym class Haneda shouts at Minazuki who, despite wanting to be a human dancer, is the worst dancer of the class. Minazuki insists all she needs is determination and a love for dancing. Hitoma is amazed by her attitude, with Minazuki explaining she had to learn to be strong. As Poseidon's heir Minazuki was expected to become Queen of the Ocean, so it angered her parents she decided to become human. She also has great motivation to succeed since mermaids who try and fail to become human are turned into sea foam. Ohgami confesses she might become wild. Hitoma misidentifies this as arousal and rejects the idea of a student/teacher relationship. However, the next day when it is full moon Ohgami gains her werewolf personality; a loud, outgoing gyaru who decides to discover what kind of woman Hitoma likes. Elsewhere, another female werewolf regrets she must be imprisoned every full moon due to her unusual transformations.
3	"The Misanthrope and the Lonely Castle Under the Full Moon"; Transliteration: "Ningen-girai to Ichirin no Kojō" (Japanese: 人間嫌いと一輪の孤城)	Won Hoe Kim & Kaito Asakura	Katsuhiko Takayama	Yūichi Nihei	January 25, 2026
As Hitoma won't see her for another month he asks gyaru-Ohgami why she wants to disappear. She explains Ohgami has grown to hate her, but since she loves Ohgami she has decided to grant her wish by disappearing. After she leaves flashbacks show the female werewolf was Ohgami as a child and that she is actually a reverse werewolf; Ohgami is actually the wolf personality most of the time except for the full moon when she turns into gyaru-Ohgami who is actually the human. For this, her family would imprison her during full moon, causing Ohgami to resent gyaru-Ohgami. To end Ohgami's suffering gyaru-Ohgami decided it was best to let Ohgami be a wolf full time. Ohgami stops coming to school for two weeks, worrying everyone. Hitoma stays late for paperwork and catches Ohgami sneaking into the classroom. She reveals because she and gyaru-Ohgami share sight/sound memories but not emotional memory gyaru-Ohgami mistakenly thinks she hates her, when in fact Ohgami hates herself and wants to let gyaru-Ohgami be human all the time. Hitoma explains humans are always quick to jump to conclusions, which must include gyaru-Ohgami, so if she wants gyaru-Ohgami to understand she needs to say it out loud so gyaru-Ohgami hears it through their sight/sound memory. Ohgami confesses out loud that she loves gyaru-Ohgami. That night at home she begins an exchange diary so they can pass messages once a month. She also admits that now they both want to become human and will be working together to see if it is possible.
4	"The Misanthrope and the Angel's Comet"; Transliteration: "Ningen-girai to Tenshi no Hōkiboshi" (Japanese: 人間嫌いと天使のほうき星)	Masahiko Matsunaga & Rintarō Ogawa	Katsuhiko Takayama	Akira Nishimori	February 1, 2026
Principal Karasume informs Hitoma and Usami that Kizaki, the elderly human Usami wants to become human for, is likely to die soon. Karasume offers to take Usami to visit, but only in her natural form. Usami rejects this as she wasn't a real rabbit, but a rabbit doll, so if she visits Kizaki as a doll she won't be able to communicate her feelings. Despite the potential punishment Hitoma agrees to secretly take Usami himself by holding her hand outside the barrier so his ring protects them both. At the hospital he offers Usami his ring so she can see Kizaki privately, having taken a sleeping pill to keep himself inside the hospital while his memory is temporarily erased. Usami has an emotional reunion with Kizaki and hopes once she becomes human in a year they can live together. Kizaki reveals this is impossible as she will likely die in a month. Usami regrets all her work to become human, but Kizaki convinces her there are other good reasons to become human. Usami decides she wants to become a human doctor. They return to school where Karasuma gives Karasuma a three month wage cut, suspends Usami for a week and deducts 150 of her points. Usami insists Hitoma work harder to teach her so she can become a doctor.
5	"The Misanthrope and Tobari's Hymn"; Transliteration: "Ningen-girai to Fukuin no Tobari" (Japanese: 人間嫌いと福音の帳)	Tsuyoshi Nagasawa	Katsuhiko Takayama	Kaito Asakura	February 8, 2026
After spilling soy sauce Hitoma accidentally cleans it up using Mr Hoshino's expensive handkerchief; a gift from his wife. With Haneda's help Hitoma apologises to Hoshino, who isn't mad as he is happy to have the handkerchief back which he lost a week ago. Hitoma is confused by Haneda as her school records are all sealed. Haneda becomes ill and is sent to Nurse Karasuma who is not surprised as Haneda usually becomes ill for the same reason once a year. Hitoma asks about Haneda's favourite music and is embarrassed to learn she currently watches music videos made by him on social media. She jokes that he is inconsiderate which unexpectedly upsets him due to a past incident. He explains that at his previous school he tried to mediate a fight between two female students, accidentally making things worse. One girl decided to transfer schools but also accused Hitoma of hitting her, leading to losing his job. Haneda advises that he is a different person than he used to be and they are all grateful he is there. She takes him to the roof and takes him flying. He is grateful she made him feel better but is forced to deduct points for unhuman-like behaviour, making her laugh. He asks to hear her singing, which is overheard by the other girls in the dormitories.
6	"The Misanthrope and the Light of Dawn"; Transliteration: "Ningen-girai to Reimei no Hikari" (Japanese: 人間嫌いと黎明の光)	Masahiko Matsunaga & Rintarō Ogawa	Katsuhiko Takayama	Satomi Nakamura	February 15, 2026
Ohgami and gyaru-Ohgami decide they wish to eventually separate into two separate humans. Final assignments approach so Minazuki is tasked with locating one of the Director's Gems, Usami to collect autograph of every student and teacher, Haneda to write a new sports anthem and Ohgami to write a 20,000 word story. Haneda finishes her song by the end of January. Usami struggles as many first-year demi-humans cannot maintain human forms, so she is having to teach them to write. Ohgami finishes her story in the first week of February and by the second week Usami collects all her autographs. Minazuki insists on finishing her assignment herself, upsetting Usami as Minazuki never asks for help. On the third week gyaru-Ohgami appears and tricks Minazuki into explaining the clues. Gyaru-Ohgami realises the clues refer to a hiragana exercise they all did as first years. Minazuki realises it is alright to ask for help and apologises to Usami. The hiragana leads them to more clues referring to a romantic confession. The next day Ohgami returns and explains she wrote her story about a confession under a cherry tree. There, Minazuki finds a box containing one of the school's magic rings. The Principal congratulates them for finishing their assignments. Minazuki insists her points be shared equally with the others. After calculating their points and achievements for the year the Principal announces one person has the requirements to become human; Minazuki.
7	"The Misanthrope and the Fruitless Love Fortune"; Transliteration: "Ningen-girai to Adabana no Koi Uranai" (Japanese: 人間嫌いと徒花の恋占い)	Daisuke Tsukushi	Katsuhiko Takayama	Daisuke Tsukushi	February 22, 2026
Minazuki graduates. Hitoma is surprised Saotome is married to Hoshino. The Principal introduces Hitoma to the Director, Haneda, actually a Phoenix demi-human the whole time. As a crow-tengu, the Principal reveals he senses the future and foresaw Hitoma becoming a valuable teacher. Haneda reveals she built the school so she could watch non-immortal beings for fun, but now she has her own goal of becoming human so her eternal existence will eventually end. Months later, along with Usami, Ohgami and Haneda, Hitoma gets new students. Dragon-girl Karin who wants a human romance and proposes marriage to Hitoma, which he ignores. Mouse-girl Nezu wants to try all human cuisine and Cat-girl Kurosawa keeps her reason a secret. Hitoma is forced to scold Karin for inappropriate behaviour. She reveals she has been watching him all year and decided he is her ideal husband. She reveals when she was still a dragon she met a human princess who treated her with kindness. A foreign prince eventually married the princess whom she never saw again. Karin was jealous and wanted to feel how they felt. Centuries later she learned about the academy where she could become human. Hitoma rejects her feelings but promises she won't be lonely in his class. Ohgami helps Karin get over the rejection. Hitoma is baffled when Karin confesses to him again the very next day.
8	"The Misanthrope and the Magic of Peace and Quiet"; Transliteration: "Ningen-girai to An'nei no Mahō" (Japanese: 人間嫌いと安寧の魔法)	Ryōhei Endō	Katsuhiko Takayama	Masayoshi Nishida	March 1, 2026
Haneda shows Hitoma a shrine which was the original school. Their first student was a dryad whom Haneda turned human straight away, which was a disaster as the dryad failed to fit in. Haneda decided to open a real school to prepare students for human society, and the dryad became the cherry tree which powers the school's barrier. Haneda introduces Hitoma to witch Alice Medea, who is technically Kurosawa's owner. Alice worries about Kurosawa and wants her to be human as soon as possible, explaining Kurosawa has recently gained magic, risking her becoming a Nekomata; a demonic black cat. Hitoma is concerned Kurosawa only seems to want to be human because Alice told her to. That night Kurosawa is caught trying to leave the barrier and confesses she doesn't want to be human, but as her only options are become a Nekomata or human, she asks Alice to kill her instead. Alice refuses and wishes instead to find a container to store Kurosawa's magic and prevent her becoming Nekomata. Haneda offers to look after Kurosawa for three years so Alice can create a suitable container. Kurosawa is returned to her cat form and allowed to live in the shrine, which is so disused Hitoma is put in charge of cleaning it regularly.
9	"The Misanthrope and the Heart's Deepest Desire"; Transliteration: "Ningen-girai to Magokoro no Honkai" (Japanese: 人間嫌いと真心の本懐)	Kotarō Kikuchi	Katsuhiko Takayama	Akira Nishimori	March 8, 2026
Hitoma is curious what Haneda wants to do as a human and is surprised she plans to do anything that makes her a better person. Final assignments arrive again; Nezu is tasked with repairing a bowl using Kintsugi (lacquer and gold dust), Usami with writing personal letters to everyone, Ohgami with reviewing ten books, Karin with being Dorm-mother for the first years for ten days and Haneda to build a musical instrument. During the tasks Usami loses her temper due to being overwhelmed by everyone. Hitoma and Nurse Karasuma assure her it is alright to feel that way, so Usami apologises. Nezu completes her bowl and Haneda finishes building an electric guitar. Ohgami struggles with the reviews as does Usami in writing her letters, so she asks Gyaru-Ohgami for help. The first years give Karin cookies for being Dorm-mother. Gyaru-Ohgami is impressed by her letter, making Usami confident enough to give everyone else their letters. Everyone is brought to tears by the nice things she writes. Ohgami is inspired to write reviews less focused on details and more on how the books made her feel. Principal is impressed with all their assignments and, after totalling up their points for the year, announces the ones to become human will be Ohgami and Gyaru-Ohgami.
10	"The Misanthrope and the Comet's Pilgrimage"; Transliteration: "Ningen-girai to Junrei no Hōkiboshi" (Japanese: 人間嫌いと巡礼のほうき星)	Toshiteru Masamoto	Katsuhiko Takayama	Yūichi Nihei	March 15, 2026
As Ohgami cannot become two people until after becoming human the class decide to have an informal graduation for gyaru-Ohgami. After causing a misunderstanding with Ohgami who felt alone during the ceremony preparation, gyaru-Ohgami is thrilled to receive her own graduation certificate during the full moon. Three days later Ohgami receives her certificate and says goodbye to everyone. Usami asks Hitoma to deliver the last letter she wrote for her assignment, since she hasn't graduated and can't deliver it to Seiko Kizaki's grave herself. On the trip Hitoma encounters Sae Kizaki, Seiko's daughter, who is also visiting her grave. Sae guesses Usami knew Seiko well as she decorated the envelope with Cosmos, Seiko's favourite flower that reminded her of her precious stuffed rabbit that went missing. Hitoma tells a small lie by claiming Seiko gave the rabbit as a gift to Usami before she died, so it is not really missing. Sae gives Hitoma her number for Usami, hoping they can talk one day. Usami looks forward to meeting Sae as a human. Haneda informs Hitoma he will get even more new students next year, plus an assistant teacher. Hitoma is shocked his assistant will be Mirai Haruna, another human.
11	"The Misanthrope and the Nigh Past"; Transliteration: "Ningen-girai to Konata no Kajitsu" (Japanese: 人間嫌いと此方の過日)	Kaito Asakura	Katsuhiko Takayama	Masatoyo Takada	March 22, 2026
Flashbacks show Haruna was once Hitoma's student. Hitoma was concerned Haruna let others take advantage of her, in particular her classmate Rio Akazawa. When Haruna started defying Akazawa she started bullying Haruna, who began skipping classes and often spent time with Hitoma in the staff office. Hitoma tried to stop the bullying but as Akazawa's parents donated lots of money to the school Hitoma was framed for causing Haruna's injuries that were actually caused by Akazawa, and Haruna was threatened into testifying against Hitoma. Hitoma lost his job and Haruna was expelled for supposedly bullying Akazawa. The last time they saw each other Haruna accused Hitoma of ruining her life. On her first day Haruna seems pleased to see Hitoma again. He apologises for not protecting her in the past but Haruna assures him she got over it and is looking forward to being his coworker in such an unusual academy. Their first class together is already chaotic due to the arrival of two new students, one of whom embarrasses Haruna easily. The others suspect Haruna to be a pushover even less reliable than Hitoma.
12	"The Misanthrope and Falsehood Found Nigh"; Transliteration: "Ningen-girai to Konata no Kyokō" (Japanese: 人間嫌いと此方の虚構)	Kotarō Kikuchi	Katsuhiko Takayama	Yūichi Nihei	March 29, 2026
Wakaba, an elf princess, wants to become a model. Okonogi, an Oni descendant, wishes to stop lying, since her Oni power forces her to lie constantly. Haneda admits she invited Haruna to work at the school, but it was Haruna's choice to accept; beyond that, Haneda has no ulterior motives. Hitoma doubts Haruna got over what happened in the past, but Haruna insists she has. Hitoma discovers Okonogi can tell when other people lie, which got her in trouble by pointing out the lies of important people. For Christmas the class receive permission for a trip to the human world. Okonogi buys a bean bun that reminds her of her mother, whom she misses. Hitoma deduces she wants to stop seeing other's lies so she can live with her mother without causing trouble. Okonogi reveals to her truth is blue, lies are red and purple are half-truths, and it upset her every time her mother had to turn red while trying to protect her. Hitoma is surprised Okonogi likes him for being mostly blue, and even more surprised Okonogi claims Haruna is mostly red. Okonogi secretly tells Haruna she is always red while talking to Hitoma, upsetting Haruna. Hitoma is confused but Okonogi assures him someone as blue as he is could never understand.
13	"The Misanthrope and the Nigh Future"; Transliteration: "Ningen-gurai to Konata no Mirai" (Japanese: 人間嫌いと此方の未来)	Kaito Asakura	Katsuhiko Takayama	Kaito Asakura	April 5, 2026
For assignments Usami is asked to trade worthless items until she has traded for something the Principal would want. She eventually trades for a magic crystal. Okonogi is told to write 100 truths, Karin to gain 5000 social-media followers, Wakaba to write a diary, Nezu to cook for others and Haneda to create a three-instrument song. Hitoma finds two younger students arguing about their assignment to do deeds that people thank them for; Maibara is upset Tsukino is tricking people into thanking her for solving problems that she caused. Tsukino falls downstairs but Usami saves her with the crystal, which vanishes after being used. Tsukino apologises and promises to finish her assignment honestly. Later, Principal announces Usami will be graduating. She is confused since she couldn't submit the crystal, but Principal reveals Tsukomi submitted an emotional appeal letter, which he considers an excellent trade for a magic crystal. Hitoma gives her Sae's phone number. Haruna admits she sometimes wishes she never met Hitoma, since then she wouldn't have ruined his life. Hitoma is relieved since he thought Haruna blamed him for ruining her life instead. Haruna admits more lies she told to get him fired, hoping the more she hurt him the more he would hate her, which she felt she deserved. Hitoma forgives her, so she decides to become an excellent teacher just like him. Hitoma informs Haneda he will work at the school until she has graduated, however long it takes. Haneda hopes he can teach her even more about being human.

== Reception ==
The series was ranked seventh in the tankōbon category in the 2022 Next Light Novel Awards.
