= Tear Studio =

Japanese animation studio

- Native name: 株式会社ティアスタジオ
- Romanized name: Kabushiki-gaisha Teia Sutajio
- Type: Kabushiki gaisha
- Industry: Animation studio
- Founded: March 15, 2013; 13 years ago
- Defunct: December 13, 2019; 6 years ago
- Fate: Bankruptcy
- Headquarters: 4-36-15 Narita-Higashi, Suginami, Tokyo, Japan
- Key people: Jun Katō (Chairman)
- Website: tear-studio.com

Tear Studio Co., Ltd. (Japanese: 株式会社ティアスタジオ, Hepburn: Kabushiki-gaisha Teia Sutajio) was a Japanese animation studio founded on March 15, 2013. The studio filled for bankruptcy in December 2019 with about 43 million yen in debt, including about 8 million yen to approximately 50 animators.

== Establishment ==
Tear Studio was established in Suginami, Tokyo, Japan by Jun Katō. On March 15, 2013, Teartribe was founded as Tear Studio's overseas production department, aiming to work in partnership with Chinese studios experienced in the animation industry to achieve stable economic and production quality.

== Works ==
=== Television series ===
Title	Director(s)	First run start date	First run end date	Eps	Note(s)	Ref(s)
Lord of Vermilion: The Crimson King	Eiji Suganuma; Satoshi Takafuji	July 13, 2018	September 28, 2018	12	Based on the Lord of Vermilion series by Square Enix. Co-production with Asread.	
Why the Hell are You Here, Teacher!?	Hiraku Kaneko; Toshikatsu Tokoro	April 8, 2019	June 24, 2019	12	Based on a manga series written by Soborou.	

=== Films ===
Title	Director(s)	Release date	Note(s)	Ref(s)
The Royal Tutor	Katsuya Kikuchi	February 16, 2019	A new project based on a Japanese series written by Higasa Akai.	

=== Original video animations ===
Title	Director(s)	Release date	Eps	Note(s)	Ref(s)
Fragtime	Takuya Satō	November 22, 2019	1	Based on a manga series written by Sato. Co-produced with East Fish Studio.	
Why the Hell are You Here, Teacher!?	Hiraku Kaneko; Toshikatsu Tokoro	December 11, 2019	1	OVA episode for Why the Hell are You Here, Teacher!?.	
