= 10th Seiyu Awards =

2016 voice acting award in Tokyo

- Awarded for: Voice acting in Japan
- Date: March 12, 2016
- Location: JOQR Media Plus Hall; Minato, Tokyo
- Country: Japan

Highlights
- Best Lead Actor: Yoshitsugu Matsuoka
- Best Lead Actress: Inori Minase
- Website: www.seiyuawards.jp

The 10th Seiyu Awards was held on March 12, 2016, at the JOQR Media Plus Hall in Minato, Tokyo.

== First Group ==
The winners of the first group were announced on the ceremony day.

Winners	Agency	Highlight Voice Roles	Works (Format)
Best Actor in a Leading Role
Yoshitsugu Matsuoka	I'm Enterprise	Kazuto Kirigaya	Sword Art Online II (Anime television series)
Yoshitsugu Matsuoka	I'm Enterprise	Sōma Yukihira	Food Wars: Shokugeki no Soma (Anime television series)
Best Actress in a Leading Role
Inori Minase	Sony Music Artists	Jun Naruse	The Anthem of the Heart (Anime film)
Inori Minase	Sony Music Artists	Yuki Takeya	School-Live! (Anime television series)
Best Actors in Supporting Roles
Kenichi Suzumura	INTENTION	Hirari Abeno	Laughing Under the Clouds (Anime television series)
Kenichi Suzumura	INTENTION	Iyami	Mr. Osomatsu (Anime television series)
Yoshimasa Hosoya	freelance	Orga Itsuka	Mobile Suit Gundam: Iron-Blooded Orphans (Anime television series)
Yoshimasa Hosoya	freelance	Ginti	Death Parade (Anime television series)
Best Actresses in Supporting Roles
Shizuka Itō	Ken Production	Meiko Shiraki	Prison School (Anime television series)
Shizuka Itō	Ken Production	Minako Aino/Sailor Venus	Sailor Moon Crystal (Net anime series)
Saori Hayami	I'm Enterprise	Haruka Ogasawara	Sound! Euphonium (Anime television series)
Saori Hayami	I'm Enterprise	Yukino Yukinoshita	My Teen Romantic Comedy SNAFU TOO! (Anime television series)
Best Rookie Actors
Yūichirō Umehara	Arts Vision	Kuroo Hazama	Young Black Jack (Anime television series)
Yūichirō Umehara	Arts Vision	Wakasa	Orenchi no Furo Jijō (Anime television series)
Shunsuke Takeuchi	81 Produce	Producer	The Idolmaster Cinderella Girls (Anime television series)
Shunsuke Takeuchi	81 Produce	Hugo	Young Black Jack (Anime television series)
Ayumu Murase	VIMS	Shōyō Hinata	Haikyū!! 2 (Anime television series)
Ayumu Murase	VIMS	Joker	Mysterious Joker (Anime television series)
Best Rookie Actresses
Sumire Uesaka	Space Craft Entertainment	Fubuki	Kantai Collection (Anime television series)
Sumire Uesaka	Space Craft Entertainment	Anastasia	The Idolmaster Cinderella Girls (Anime television series)
Rie Takahashi	81 Produce	Futaba Ichinose	Seiyu's Life! (Anime television series)
Rie Takahashi	81 Produce	Kobayashi	Rampo Kitan: Game of Laplace (Anime television series)
Aimi Tanaka	81 Produce	Umaru Doma	Himouto! Umaru-chan (Anime television series)
Aimi Tanaka	81 Produce	Ryū Yuien	Lance N' Masques (Anime television series)
Best Musical Performance
Winner	Members	Agency	Record Label
iRis	Saki Yamashita (leader); Yū Serizawa; Himika Akaneya; Yuki Wakai; Miyu Kubota; Azuki Shibuya	81 Produce	Avex Group
Personality Award
Winner	Agency	Radio Program	Broadcasting Station
Kenichi Suzumura	INTENTION	Unison!	JOQR
Most Votes Award
Winner		Agency	
Hiroshi Kamiya (Hall of Fame)		Aoni Production	

== 2nd Group ==
The winners of the Merit/Achievement Awards, the Synergy Award, the Kei Tomiyama Award, the Kazue Takahashi Award, and the Special Award were announced on February 16, 2016. The winner of the Kids Family Award was announced on the ceremony day.

Achievement Award
Winners	Agency	
Sachiko Chijimatsu	81 Produce	
Tadashi Nakamura	Haikyō	
Michiko Nomura	Ken Production	
Synergy Award
Winner	Representative	Agency
Chibi Maruko-chan	Tarako	Troubadour Musique Office
Kei Tomiyama Memorial Award
Winner	Agency	
Showtaro Morikubo	VIMS	
Kazue Takahashi Memorial Award
Winner	Agency	
Kikuko Inoue	Office Anemone	
Kids Family Award
Winner	Voice Role	Works (Format)
Pierre Coffin	Minions	Minions (American 3DCG animation film)
Special Award
Winner	Agency	Record Label
AŌP; Members: Risa Sakurana, Kei Tomoe, Yuuki Hirose, Saori Ogino, Aoi Mizuki, and Yui Fukuo	AT-X	ARUTEMATE
