= Aikatsu! x PriPara: The Movie – Miraculous Meeting =

2025 film by Takahiro Ôkawa

Aikatsu! x PriPara The Movie: -Miraculous Meeting-
- Theatrical release poster
- Japanese: アイカツ！×プリパラ THE MOVIE -出会いのキセキ！-
- Revised Hepburn: Aikatsu! x PuriPara za Mūbī Deai no Kiseki!
- Directed by: Takahiro Ôkawa
- Screenplay by: Michihiro Tsuchiya
- Based on: Aikatsu! by BN Pictures and Bandai; PriPara by T-Arts and Syn Sophia
- Starring: Shino Shimoji; Yu Wakui; Yui Ishikawa; Himika Akaneya; Yu Serizawa; Miyu Kubota
- Cinematography: Yōichi Ōgam
- Edited by: Kazuhiro Nii
- Production company: BN Pictures
- Distributed by: Bandai Namco Pictures; Avex Pictures
- Release date: October 10, 2025
- Running time: 75 minutes
- Country: Japan
- Language: Japanese

Aikatsu! x PriPara The Movie: -Miraculous Meeting- (Japanese: アイカツ！×プリパラ THE MOVIE -出会いのキセキ！-, Hepburn: Gekijōban Aikatsu! x PuriPara za Mūbī Deai no Kiseki!) is a 2025 Japanese animated musical film directed by Takahiro Ôkawa and written by Michihiro Tsuchiya; the film is based on the anime television series by BN Pictures & Bandai and PriPara by T-Arts & Syn Sophia. Produced by BN Pictures with 3DCG from Tatsunoko Production and distributed by Bandai Namco Pictures and Avex Pictures. It focuses on the idols from Starlight Academy and Parajuku enjoy a dream collaboration at a joint live festival. The film stars the voices of Shino Shimoji, Yu Wakui, Yui Ishikawa, Himika Akaneya, Yu Serizawa and Miyu Kubota. It was released in Japan on October 10, 2025.

== Voice cast ==
- Shino Shimoji as Akari Ozora
- Yu Wakui as Sumire Hikami
- Yui Ishikawa as Hinaki Shinjo
- Aya Saito as Juri Kurebayashi
- Yuki Takada as Rin Kurosawa
- Chihiro Kawakami as Madoka Amahane
- Kotori Koiwai as Nono Daichi
- Sanae Fuku as Lisa Shirakaba
- Akira Sekine as Miyabi Fujiwara
- Kanae Itō as Kokone Kurisu
- Asami Yano as Nina Dojima
- Himika Akaneya as Laala Manaka
- Yu Serizawa as Mirei Minami
- Miyu Kubota as Sophie Hojo
- Saki Yamakita as Sion Todo
- Azuki Shibuya as Dorothy West
- Yuki Wakai as Reona West
- Yui Makino as Aroma Kurosu
- Yui Watanabe as Mikan Shiratama
- Asami Sanada as Gaaruru
- Mitsuki Saiga as Hibiki Shikyoin
- Chinatsu Akasaki as Falulu

== Production ==
It was announced on April 23, 2025. The official websites revealed a 10th-anniversary collaboration project between the Akari's generation of Aikatsu! and PriPara.

== Reception ==
=== Box office ===
The film opened at number 6 out of top 10 in the Japanese box office in its opening weekend.

== Release ==
The film has released in theaters in Japan on October 10, 2025.
