= Rina Honnizumi =

Japanese voice actress

- 本泉 莉奈
- Born: February 4, 1993 (age 33); Fukushima Prefecture, Japan
- Education: Nihon University
- Occupation: Voice actress
- Years active: 2013–present
- Agent: 81 Produce
- Notable work: Hugtto! PreCure as Saaya Yakushiji/Cure Ange; Wise Man's Grandchild as Sicily von Claude; Plunderer as Hina; Let's Make a Mug Too as Toko Aoki; Hatsune Miku: Colorful Stage! as Shizuku Hinomori
- Height: 158 cm (5 ft 2 in)
- Awards: Best New Actress Award at the 13th Seiyu Awards

Rina Honnizumi (本泉 莉奈, Hon'izumi Rina) is a Japanese voice actress affiliated with 81 Produce. She is best known for her roles as Saaya Yakushiji / Cure Ange in Hugtto! PreCure. Later other roles in Wise Man's Grandchild, and Plunderer.

== Biography ==
Honnizumi was born on February 4 in Fukushima Prefecture. She wanted to be a voice actor since she was in high school. Honnizumi graduated from Tokyo Animation College in March 2013.

In addition to voicing Cure Ange in Hugtto! PreCure, she also sang the ending themes "Hugtto! Future✩Dreamer" and "Hugtto! Yell For You" alongside the other main Cures. She also won the Best New Actress Award for the role of Cure Ange at the 13th Seiyu Awards alongside Manaka Iwami, Tomori Kusunoki, Coco Hayashi, and Kaede Hondo.

On December 20, 2018, she was cast as Sicily von Claude in the spring 2019 anime Wise Man's Grandchild alongside Yūsuke Kobayashi and Miyu Kubota. On July 4, 2019, she was cast as Hina in the manga-to-anime series Plunderer alongside Yoshiki Nakajima; it is set to premiere in 2020. On September 20, 2019, Honnizumi was cast as Shiragiku Ōmura in Tamayomi, another manga-to-anime series set to premiere in 2020, alongside Miyu Tomita, Yume Miyamoto, and fellow veteran Pretty Cure alumni Rina Kitagawa and Haruka Yoshimura.

In addition to anime, Honnizumi also voices Nadeshiko in the KLabs/MF Bunko J multimedia project Lapis Re:Lights.

== Filmography ==
=== Anime television series ===
| Year | Title | Role | Notes | Source |
|---|---|---|---|---|
| 2013 | Kill la Kill | Customer | | |
| 2013 | Tamagotchi! | Customer | | |
| 2013 | Duel Masters Victory V3 | Teacher | | |
| 2014 | Super Sonico the Animation | Hyde-chan | | |
| 2014 | Tenkai Knights | Classmate | | |
| 2014 | Hanayamata | Student | | |
| 2015 | Rin-ne | Nekoda | | |
| 2015 | Wish Upon the Pleiades | Student A | | |
| 2016 | Qualidea Code | Announcer, Student | | |
| 2016 | Trickster | Pippo, Tomoe Tsuji | | |
| 2016 | Sailor Moon Crystal | Viluy | ONA | |
| 2017 | Yowamushi Pedal | Schoolgirl | | |
| 2017 | BanG Dream! | Mayu Kawabata, Kaede Mizumura | | |
| 2017 | Tomica Hyper Rescue Drive Head Kidō Kyūkyū Keisatsu | Haruka | | |
| 2017 | The Laughing Salesman | Female colleague | | |
| 2017 | Welcome to the Ballroom | Chinatsu's friend | | |
| 2017 | My Matchmaking Partner Is a Student, An Aggressive Troublemaker | Nano Saikawa | Normal version only | |
| 2017 | UQ Holder! | Meg | | |
| 2017 | Future Card Buddyfight | Child B | | |
| 2017 | Juni Taisen: Zodiac War | Student | | |
| 2018 | Aikatsu Stars! | Girl | | |
| 2018 | Beatless | Clerk | | |
| 2018 | Hugtto! PreCure | Saaya Yakushiji/Cure Ange | | |
| 2018 | Inazuma Eleven: Ares | Surrounding girls | | |
| 2018 | Tada Never Falls in Love | Schoolgirl | | |
| 2018 | Wotakoi: Love Is Hard for Otaku | Minor characters | | |
| 2018 | Ongaku Shōjo | Shupe's mother | | |
| 2018 | 100 Sleeping Princes and the Kingdom of Dreams | Citizen B | | |
| 2018 | Merc Storia | Kesesera | | |
| 2018 | That Time I Got Reincarnated as a Slime | Pirino | | |
| 2018 | Zombie Land Saga | Migikawa | | |
| 2019 | Wise Man's Grandchild | Sicily von Claude | | |
| 2019 | Endro! | Villager | | |
| 2019 | Wasteful Days of High School Girls | Schoolgirl | | |
| 2020 | Plunderer | Hina | | |
| 2020 | MapleStory | Edea | | |
| 2020 | Tamayomi | Shiragiku Ōmura | | |
| 2020 | Lapis Re:Lights | Nadeshiko | | |
| 2020 | The Gymnastics Samurai | Rei Aragaki | | |
| 2021 | Beyblade Burst Dynamite Battle | Hannah Suiryū | | |
| 2021 | Let's Make a Mug Too | Toko Aoki | | |
| 2021 | Remake Our Life! | Maki Hashiba | | |
| 2022 | Kakegurui Twin | Tsuzura Hanatemari | ONA | |
| 2022 | Harem in the Labyrinth of Another World | Vesta | | |
| 2023 | Summoned to Another World for a Second Time | Mineko | | |
| 2024 | Solo Leveling | Lee Joo-hee | | |
| 2024 | Yatagarasu: The Raven Does Not Choose Its Master | Asebi | | |
| 2026 | Chainsmoker Cat | Imoko | | |
| 2026 | Mebius Dust | Anzu | | |
| 2026 | The Ghost in the Shell | Passerby | | |
| 2026 | Nia Liston: The Merciless Maiden | Hildetora Altoir | | |

=== Anime films ===
| Year | Title | Role | Source |
|---|---|---|---|
| 2018 | Pretty Cure Super Stars! | Saaya Yakushiji/Cure Ange | |
| 2018 | Hugtto! PreCure Futari wa Pretty Cure: All Stars Memories | Saaya Yakushiji/Cure Ange | |
| 2019 | Pretty Cure Miracle Universe | Saaya Yakushiji/Cure Ange | |
| 2019 | Tannishō o Hiraku | Asa | |
| 2025 | Colorful Stage! The Movie: A Miku Who Can't Sing | Shizuku Hinomori | |

=== OVA ===
| Year | Title | Role | Source |
|---|---|---|---|
| 2026 | The Idolmaster Million Live! Itsuka, Mannaka de | Hana Miyamura | |

=== Dubbing ===
| Year | Title | Role | Source |
|---|---|---|---|
| 2019 | Mad Max: Fury Road | Cheedo the Fragille | |

=== Video games ===
- Atelier Lydie & Suelle: The Alchemists and the Mysterious Paintings DX - Nelke von Luchetam
- BanG Dream! - Mayu Kawabata
- Destiny Child - Selene
- Grimms Notes - Karen
- MapleStory - Edea
- Nelke & the Legendary Alchemists: Ateliers of the New World - Nelke von Luchetam
- Project Sekai: Colorful Stage feat. Hatsune Miku - Shizuku Hinomori
- Figure Fantasy - Evita
- Beyblade X: Xone - Protagonist (Female)
