= Mahou Shoujo Nante Mouiidesukara =

Japanese manga series

- Cover of the first manga volume

魔法少女なんてもういいですから。 (Mahō Shōjo Nante Mō Ii Desu Kara.)
- Genre: Comedy, magical girl
- Manga
- Written by: Sui Futami
- Published by: Earth Star Entertainment
- Magazine: Comic Earth Star
- Original run: 31 March 2015 – 12 July 2018
- Volumes: 3
- Anime television series
- Directed by: Kazuhiro Yoneda
- Written by: Kazuyuki Fudeyasu
- Music by: Masato Nakayama
- Studio: Pine Jam
- Licensed by: Crunchyroll
- Original network: Tokyo MX, Sun TV
- Original run: 12 January 2016 – 29 March 2016
- Episodes: 12
- Anime television series

Mahou Shoujo Nante Mouiidesukara Second Season
- Directed by: Kazuhiro Yoneda
- Written by: Momoko Murakami
- Studio: Pine Jam
- Licensed by: Crunchyroll
- Original network: Tokyo MX, Sun TV, AT-X
- Original run: 5 October 2016 – 21 December 2016
- Episodes: 12

Mahou Shoujo Nante Mouiidesukara (魔法少女なんてもういいですから。, Mahō Shōjo Nante Mō Ii Desu Kara.; "I've Had Enough of Being a Magical Girl") is a Japanese manga series written and illustrated by Sui Futami. An anime television series adaptation by Pine Jam aired from January to March 2016, and a second season aired from October to December of the same year.

== Plot ==
The story is set in a world where magical girls are not necessary any more, yet girls with the aptitude of magical girls still exist in small number. Yuzuka Hanami, the protagonist, meets a magical creature Miton, and is turned into a magical girl, and starts a "magical" life without battles or other magical girl quests.

== Characters ==
Yuzuka Hanami (花海 ゆずか, Hanami Yuzuka)
Voiced by: Akane Fujita
The protagonist. A girl who becomes magical girl after meeting Miton. After she transforms, she was fit in a swimsuit, much to her chagrin and embarrassment. She allows Miton to accompany her, but repulses his attempt for intimate interactions. She is serious in studying and good at cooking, unlike many magical girls that Miton knew before. She can create and control water when she is a magical girl.
Miton (ミトン)
Voiced by: Yuki Wakai
The magical creature that turns Yuzuka into a magical girl after meeting her. His appearance (to Yuzuka and other girls with the aptitude of magical girls) features a white spherical body with two long wings and a bird-like tail; he is supposed to be invisible and inaudible to the normal people, but he is able to show himself to them at will. Yuzuka and Chiya always keep distance from him, despite his pursuing intimate relationship with the girls. His taste is close to that of human, and he has a strong desire for delicious foods. He also has the power to create a barrier that allows private conversations without being heard or noticed by others, and project images with his eyes.
Chiya Sakagami (坂上 ちや, Sakagami Chiya)
Voiced by: Nichika Ōmori
Yuzuka's friend, who deems Yuzuka as "most important friend" and truly cares about her; for example, she is on guard against Miton for the good of Yuzuka. She is usually emotionless and speaks in mono-tone voice. She can see and hear Miton, and has the aptitude of a magical girl; however, the limitation in Miton's capacity prevents her from really becoming one. She is fascinated by Yuzuka's status and figure as magical girl. Her imaginary magical girl outfit is a maid's uniform that enables her to shoot lasers.
Dia Amafū (天風 だいや, Amafū Daiya)
Voiced by: Minami Tanaka
She is Yuzuka's acquaintance, and later gets acquainted by Chiya. She is a cute girl, much younger than Yuzaka and Chiya, and behaves very politely and considerately so that she even affects the usually emotionless Chiya. She seems to be able to see and feel Miton and Pochi as well as spirits, which indicates that she also has the aptitude of a magical girl. Her imaginary magical girl outfit is a cat suit that enables her to ride a giant ice cream cone like a rocket.
Mafuyu Shinoki (都市乃木 真冬, Shinoki Mafuyu)
Voiced by: Miku Itō
Another magical girl who is met by Yuzuka and Chiya, and then befriends them. She is one grade higher in school than Yuzuka and Chiya. After she transforms, she is fit into a Santa Claus dress. She can control the size of her bag and generate air from it.
Pochi (ポチ)
Voiced by: Asuka Nishi
A magical creature with the form of a flying penguin. He accompanies Mafuyu. Like Miton, he experiences torture at Chiya's hands.
Noto Hanami (花海 乃登, Hanami Noto)
Voiced by: Junichi Suwabe
Yuzuka's father, a typical salary-man who is away from home for most of time due to his job. He cares about his daughter. His imaginary superhero form consists of a cape and helmet, and he fights with a sword.
Miyoko Hanami (花海 みよこ, Hanami Miyoko)
Voiced by: Chiwa Saitō
Yuzuka's mother. She accidentally witnesses Yuzuka's transformation, and grows special interests in the magical girl status of her daughter. She can also see Miton, which implies that she was once a magical girl or at least has the aptitude of one.

== Media ==
=== Manga ===
The series, written and illustrated by Sui Futami, began publication on Earth Star Entertainment's Comic Earth Star website on 31 March 2015. As of August 2022, series have ended with 43 chapters published. Last one have a web published date on; 27 June 2018.

==== Volumes ====
No.	Japanese release date	Japanese ISBN
01	12 January 2016	978-4803008425
02	26 November 2016	978-4803009590
03	12 July 2018	978-4803011715

=== Anime ===
An anime adaptation was announced in the November issue of the Animage magazine on 10 October 2015. The anime, a TV series, will be directed by Kazuhiro Yoneda, with animation by the animation studio Pine Jam. The series is written by Kazuyuki Fudeyasu and Momoko Murakami, with character designs provided by Kazuaki Shimada, who also serves as the animation director. Yukio Nagasaki is the series' sound director. The show's music is composed by Masato Nakayama and Elements Garden, and produced by F.M.F. The series premiered on 12 January 2016 (Note: The premiere is listed for 11 January 2016 at 25:11, which is the same as 12 January at 1:11.) on Tokyo MX and Sun TV, and was simulcast by Crunchyroll in the Americas, Europe, and Oceania. A second season was announced at an event on 7 August 2016, and premiered on 5 October 2016.

==== Season 1 ====
No.	Title	Original release date
1	"You Can See Me?" "...Anta, Boku ga Mieteru No Ka?" (...あんた、僕が見えてるのか？)	12 January 2016
After Noto Hanami leaves for work, his daughter Yuzuka wakes up and makes breakfast. On her way to school, she is greeted by her friends: Dia Amafū and Chiya Sakagami. As she returns home, she finds a strange winged creature named Miton in a dumpster. Miton generates a barrier to keep anyone from interrupting their conversation and reveals that only magical girls can see him. He grants Yuzuka a bracelet that can transform her into a magical girl. However, to her embarrassment, her outfit is a swimsuit. Yuzuka dislikes her new outfit and returns to normal.
2	"Yes, It's a Swimsuit. This Is Not a Mistake" "Hai, mizugi Desu. Machigai Nai Desu" (はい、水着です。間違いないです)	19 January 2016
While being forced to wear a blindfold, Miton explains to Yuzuka, who is in her magical girl outfit, that the bracelet chooses which outfit best suits the wearer. She discovers that she can create and control water. As Yuzuka cooks a meal, Miton explains how much he desired normal food due to him always searching through trash, but also further annoys her when he looks at her pantie. Yuzuka reveals that her parents are mostly away from home, so Miton decides to keep her company.
3	"Hey, You and Me Are Friends, Right?" "Nee, Yuzuka to Watashi wa Tomodachi Yo Ne?" (ねえ、ゆずかと私は友達よね？)	26 January 2016
As Yuzuka prepares to go to school, Miton tags along. Yuzuka reveals that her father works for a black company. After greeting Dia and Chiya, Chiya reveals that she can see Miton even though normal people can't see him; however, she threatens Miton due to her being highly protective of her friendship. She requests for Yuzuka to turn into her magical girl outfit as Miton creates a barrier so to keep others from seeing them. Chiya demands to be involved in this.
4	"Magical Girls Have a Retirement Age" "Mahō Shōjo Ni Wa Teinen ga Atte Ne" (魔法少女には定年があってね)	2 February 2016
On their way home, Miton explains that he can only create one bracelet and therefore cannot turn Chiya into a magical girl too nor can he transfer Yuzuka's bracelet. However, he also reveals that when magical girls reach 16, they retire. Since there is no danger in the area, Yuzuka can use her powers to do what she wishes. Yuzuka and Miton later go shopping and enjoy a meal back home, though Miton is reminded that he owes Chiya.
5	"I Don't Like the Fact That I Transform Into a Swimsuit" "Watashi wa Mizugi Ni Henshin Suru No Ga Iya Desu" (私は水着に変身するのが嫌です)	9 February 2016
While taking a bath in her magical girl outfit, Yuzuka uses her powers to create water shapes of animals. After she is done, she discovers that Miton is magically connected to the bracelet and knows what she is doing. Yuzuka still does not like her outfit and considers Miton a stranger rather than a friend.
6	"Is Employee Labor Even Tougher Than Magical Girl Battles?" "Kaisha Tsutome To Wa Mahō Shōjo no Sentō Yori Mo Kakoku Na Rōdō Nano Kai?" (会社勤めとは魔法少女の戦闘よりも過酷な労働なのかい？)	16 February 2016
Yuzuka learns that her father is coming home soon and considers telling him about Miton, but he warns her not to as it will make him a target for experimentation. He also reveals that he can manipulate memories. Once Noto returns, Yuzuka requests for a pet and she takes her magical girl form, allowing Miton to alter his memories so that he'll see Miton as a parrot, but this causes Noto to pass out. The next day, Noto returns to work.
7	"I'd Add Them to My Collection" "Watashi no Korekushon Ni Naru No Ni" (私のコレクションになるのに)	23 February 2016
Miton is put in a cooler while Yuzuka takes her magical girl form. With her is Chiya, who is also in a swimsuit. The two play around with Yuzuka's powers, but accidentally suffocate Miton. Chiya asks what would happen if Yuzuka removed her swimsuit, but Yuzuka does not want to find out. Yuzuka tries transforming while wearing another set of clothes over her current one, but her skirt disappears in the process. She further embarrasses herself after returning to normal, making her pantie appear on top of Miton.
8	"Another Magical Girl..." "Mahō Shōjo no... Nakama..." (魔法少女の...仲間......)	1 March 2016
Yuzuka introduces Chiya to Dia and they spend the day together. Yuzuka and Chiya later meet Mafuyu Shinoki, who is accompanied by a magical creature named Pochi, who resembles a flying penguin. After introducing each other, Yuzuka realizes that Mafuyu is also a magical girl.
9	"There's No Longer a Need for Magical Girls" "Mahō Shōjo no Hitsuyōsei wa Mō Nai" (魔法少女の必要性はもう無い)	8 March 2016
After Miton sets up his barrier, Mafuyu transforms into her magical girl form, which comes with a Santa Claus outfit, while Yuzuka does the same. They quickly become friends, so do Miton and Pochi. Mafuyu reveals that she will be retiring soon. They then go to buy school supplies, only for the store to close upon arrival.
10	"You're the Perfect Woman... Ptoo!" "Kanpeki Chōjin Dayo Ne... Pe!" (完璧超人だよね......ペッ！)	15 March 2016
While doing her homework, Miton questions Yuzuka about what she isn't good at and what she doesn't like. When she expresses her dislike of her swimsuit, Miton explains that altering it or putting clothes over it won't change it. Yuzuka decides to transform, but has Miton thrown out of her room so he can't see her; however, she discovers that her mother Miyoko has witnessed it.
11	"Then, why there are magical girls?" "Jā, Nan no Tame no Mahō Shōjo Nano?" (じゃあ、何の為の魔法少女なの？)	22 March 2016
Down in the living room, Miyoko explains that she wanted to spook Yuzuka, but saw her transform. Miyoko can also see Miton. After explaining everything to Miyoko, she grows interested in her daughter's new capabilities, and has her change into her magical girl form and show off her magic. They are interrupted by Noto, prompting Yuzuka to hide behind some curtains. They also learn that he is finally able to spend more time with his family.
12	"I Will Become Yuzuka's Best Friend" "Boku wa, Yuzuka no Shinyū Ni Naru" (僕は、ゆずかの親友になる)	29 March 2016
Miton recalls past events and Yuzuka's lifestyle before asking her about her lack of having many friends. Yuzuka remembers Chiya, Dia, and Mafuyu and decides that she has enough friends already as having too many friends can be an issue. Later at school, Miton questions Chiya about Yuzuka's friendships. He eventually decides to become Yuzuka's best friend.

==== Season 2 ====
No.	Title	Original release date
1	"Were There any Benefits to Becoming a Magical Girl?" "Mahō Shōjo ni Natte Meritto wa Atta no?" (魔法少女になってメリットはあったの？)	5 October 2016
In Chiya's backyard, Yuzuka turns into her magical girl form while Chiya quickly changes into her swimsuit. The girls enjoy playing in the water that Yuzuka conjures, but after catching Miton eating Yuzuka's ice cream, they suspend him above Chiya's cat as punishment. Later, the three meet Dia, who desires to go swimming, even though she isn't a good swimmer. Before leaving, Dia appears to be able to see Miton. They visit Mafuyu's coffee shop, which belongs to her grandfather, and is closed most of the time due to Mafuyu's grandfather being a game addict.
2	"Aren't Swimsuits Weird?" "Mizugitte Henjanai desu ka?" (水着って変じゃないですか？)	12 October 2016
Mafuyu and Yuzuka change into their magical girl forms while Chiya tortures Miton and Pochi for awing them. Yuzuka demonstrates her powers while Mafuyu reveals that she can alter the size of her bag. Even though Yuzuka is still uncomfortable with her outfit, Mafuyu convinces her to try and get used to it just as her grandfather comes out to get a look at Yuzuka. Mafuyu also believes that Pochi will transfer to Chiya once she retires.
3	"Magical Girl Chiya, Here She Comes!" "Mahō Shōjo Chiya, Tōjō Chiya~tsu!" (魔法少女ちや、登場ちやっ！)	19 October 2016
Yuzuka imagines Chiya transforming into a magical girl, with her outfit being that of a maid's uniform and her powers being able to shoot lasers. Pochi disrupts the fantasy and explains that it is not a possibly as Mafuyu is not close to retirement. Sometime later, Yuzuka, Chiya, and Miton are invited to a feast by Dia. When Miton explains that Yuzuka's food is better than what he digs up in the garbage, she retaliates by knocking him into a garbage truck.
4	"Would you Like to Enjoy Yuzuka With Us?" "Issho ni Yuzuka o Medemasen ka?" (一緒にゆずかを愛でませんか？)	26 October 2016
Pochi tells Yuzuka, Chiya, and Miton about studying, which magical girls should not be good at. As the girls return to class, Pochi sees that he is wrong about them and he and Miton embrace. Chiya is still somewhat hostile towards Miton after he informs her that Mafuyu has invited them over to study. Mafuyu texts Chiya for her appreciation, but she dismisses it.
5	"My Sister will Teach you Everything" "Onēsan ga Nandemo Oshieteageru ne" (お姉さんが何でも教えてあげるね)	2 November 2016
While Yuzuka and Chiya study with Mafuyu, Dia arrives with a gift for Yuzuka: a salmon that her father caught. She is invited to join them and quickly becomes friends with Mafuyu. They see how smart Dia is with studying. When Mafuyu still wishes to help them, Pochi comes up with an idea.
6	"Because, Looking like This..." "Tatte, Konomama no Kakkō ja..." (だって、このままの格好じゃ…)	9 November 2016
The girls all meet up in Mafuyu's coffee shop, but the air conditioner is seemly broken. Yuzuka uses her powers to cool them all off so they can play a board game. Chiya changes into her swimsuit to make Yuzuka more comfortable. Upon leaving, Chiya discovers that the air conditioner was never broken and that the whole thing was arranged to help Yuzuka feel better with her magical girl form.
7	"Isn't it too Obvious?" "Mie Sugi Nanjanai no?" (見え過ぎなんじゃないの？)	16 November 2016
After Miton eats a tray of food in front of a grave, some cats attack him in anger before Dia comes them down. The cats grow fond of Dia before she and Miton go with Chiya and Yuzuka to Mafuyu's coffee shop, where Dia meets Mafuyu's grandfather. The others discover that Dia can not only see Miton and Pochi, but ghosts as well, even though she isn't exactly a magical girl.
8	"Are you Talking About Me?" "Boki no Hanashi Kai?" (僕の話かい？)	23 November 2016
Miton explains his backstory while projecting an image of his home world, explaining that he came from another world and that most of his kind was killed trying to obtain a magical girl bracelet, leaving him the only survivor. Pochi reveals that Miton's story is fake and that they are actually colleagues who do not interact with each other much. The girls nevertheless continue to be friends with Miton.
9	"I Work! For my Family!!" "Watashi wa Hataraku! Kazoku no Tame ni!!" (私は働く!家族のために!!)	30 November 2016
Noto falls asleep in a park and dreams that Yuzuka, Dia, and Chiya are a group of magical girls fighting a monster stealing sparkles that make people enjoy work. Noto decides to help them and transforms into his superhero form, and helps the team defeat the monster. Noto then wakes up from his dream and goes home to see Yuzuka before quickly leaving.
10	"The Sea?" "Umi... desu ka?" (海…ですか？)	7 December 2016
Miton recalls Yuzuka's daily activity and later asks her if she's happy with being a magical girl. Dia invites her and the other girls to a beach, bringing Mafuyu's grandfather along too. Yuzuka chooses to wear a school swimsuit rather than her magical girl swimsuit. As they enjoy the beach, Chiya and Mafuyu form a plan to get Yuzuka to play in the water while Dia is drawn away by a ghost.
11	"The Chosen One! Now is the Time to Join Forces and Save the Imprisoned Princess" "Erabareshimono yo! Ima Koso Chikara o Awasete Toraware no Purinsesu o Sukuu no Ja～！" (選ばれし者よ！ いまこそ力を合わせて囚われのプリンセスを救うのじゃ～！)	14 December 2016
The girls notice Dia being pulled out to sea and then underwater by the ghost. Unable to call for help, Mafuyu and Yuzuka change into their magical girl forms and follow Dia. Yuzuka creates a large bubble around herself to dive underwater, but her powers run out of energy, causing the bubble to pop while also causing Miton to pass out. Yuzuka finds Dia, but begins to drown.
12	"Good Things about Becoming a Magical Girl" "Mahō Shōjo ni Natte Yokatta Koto" (魔法少女になってよかった事)	21 December 2016
Mafuyu rescues Dia and Yuzuka as the ghost flees. Pochi wipes the memories of nearby witnesses. After Miton, Yuzuka, and Dia recover, the girls continue their time on the beach. Dia also learns how to swim. While setting off fireworks, Yuzuka decides that she enjoys being a magical girl as she was able to make new friends before Chiya launches Miton into the sky like a firework.

== Reception ==
Rebecca Silverman of Anime News Network gave the series a B− rating. In her review, Silverman found the plot too short and meandering, and found the pastel animation a bit of an overreliance, but gave praise to the humor taking shots at the magical girl genre and the light-hearted tone for giving off an approachable vibe, saying that "If you just need a way to spend a cute and fun hour, Mahō Shōjo Nante Mō Ii Desu Kara. is a safe bet".

== See also ==
- Dungeon People, another manga series by the same author
