= Yuki Wakai =

Japanese voice actress (born 1995)

- 若井 友希
- Born: 30 October 1995 (age 31)
- Occupations: Voice actress; singer
- Years active: 2013–present
- Agent: 81 Produce
- Notable work: PriPara as Leona West; Kakegurui as Itsuki Sumeragi; Kiratto Pri Chan as Sara Midorikawa; Wise Man's Grandchild as Maria von Messina; Yatogame-chan Kansatsu Nikki as Mai Tadakusa; Let's Make a Mug Too as Naoko Naruse; Witch Watch as Miharu Kiryu
- Musical career
- Member of: Iris; D-selections

Yuki Wakai (若井 友希, Wakai Yūki; born 30 October 1995) is a Japanese voice actress and singer affiliated with 81 Produce. She is a member of the idol group Iris, and has starred as Leona West in PriPara, Miton in Mahou Shoujo Nante Mouiidesukara, Itsuki Sumeragi in Kakegurui, Sara Midorikawa in Kiratto Pri Chan, Maria von Messina in Wise Man's Grandchild, Mai Tadakusa in Yatogame-chan Kansatsu Nikki, Naoko Naruse in Let's Make a Mug Too, Hikari Jogasaki in Teppen—!!!, Mamoru in My Wife Has No Emotion, Riku Sorano in Princession Orchestra, and Miharu Kiryu in Witch Watch.

== Biography ==
=== Early life ===
Yuki Wakai, an only child, was born on 30 October 1995 and is a native of Gifu Prefecture. She became an anime fan in junior high, becoming interested in the Higurashi When They Cry anime after a friend of hers invited her to watch the show together, in part due to its Gifu Prefecture setting. Becoming a fan of the Bleach character Tōshirō Hitsugaya, she became interested in voice acting after learning that he was voiced by a woman, Romi Park.

While attending high school, Wakai performed street shows in Nagoya, carrying an electronic piano in her uniform. Despite being part of a unit for these performances, she "wrote [her] own lyrics, composed [her] own music, and sang them". As Wakai later recalled, the music, which she found at the time embarrassing in hindsight, "made [her] realize how important lyrics and melodies are, something you can only write at that time".

=== Iris and Pretty Rhythm ===
Wakai entered the Avex-sponsored kids' contest Kira Challenge during her second year of junior high school, winning the grand prize and attending Avex's training school the following year. After passing the Avex/81 Produce Anison Vocalist Audition, she became one of the founding members of Iris. As she recalled, her pre-debut training camp was "pretty strict" and their voice acting classes "were really tough for [her]", and having little knowledge of anime, she struggled with conversations there. In 2016, she won the Seiyu Awards Singing Award as part of Iris at the 10th Seiyu Awards.

Wakai starred in PriPara alongside the other members of Iris, voicing Leona West. She reprised her role in PriPara the Movie: Minna Atsumare! Prism Tours, the 2016 stage musical PriPara: Minna ni Todoke, and the 2025 crossover movie Aikatsu! × PriPara the Movie: A Miracle Encounter!. Throughout the Pretty Rhythm franchise, she also voiced Sara Midorikawa in Kiratto Pri Chan and Yurari Saionji in King of Prism: Shiny Seven Stars (2019).

=== Music career outside of Iris ===
Wakai performed "Destiny Sky", the ending theme song for Kingdom; it was released as a single by Dive II Entertainment on 7 November 2012, making Wakai's solo debut. She has also served as a member of the musical group D-selections.

Wakai also works as a solo musician under the name Yuki (友希), an alias she also used as a lyricist and composer for Iris. She had forgone her childhood dream of being a singer-songwriter when she settled for Iris, but reconsidered after staff encouraged her; however, she initially struggled for recognition due to her association with the idol group. She released her solo debut single "No More" in 2021. In October 2024, she performed "Hello! My Dream", her solo debut concert. Her solo debut album Main Dish will be released on 29 October 2025.

=== Voice acting and radio career ===
Wakai made her voice acting debut in the 2013 anime series Kingdom, before starring as Miton in Mahou Shoujo Nante Mouiidesukara. She starred as Itsuki Sumeragi in Kakegurui (2017–2019). She also starred as Maria von Messina in Wise Man's Grandchild and Mai Tadakusa in Yatogame-chan Kansatsu Nikki; she was selected for the latter she was originally from Gifu Prefecture and matched the character's image. She starred as Naoko Naruse in the 2021 anime Let's Make a Mug Too and was part of the anime' Mug-Mo tie-in musical group. Her other starring roles include Hikari Jogasaki in Teppen—!!!, Mamoru in My Wife Has No Emotion, and Riku Sorano in Princession Orchestra. Since 2025, she has starred as Miharu Kiryu in Witch Watch.

In March 2022, she and Akane Takayanagi started co-hosting the CBC Radio show Takayanagi Akane / Wakai Yuki no Yaodagane.

=== Personal life ===
Wakai cites Chiaki Ito as her idol.

Wakai was once part of a handball club.

== Filmography ==
=== Television animation ===
Year	Title	Role	Notes	Ref
2014–2017	PriPara	Leona West		
2016	Mahou Shoujo Nante Mouiidesukara	Miton		
2016	Twin Star Exorcists	Suzu		
2017-2018	Idol Time PriPara	Leona West		
2017–2019	Kakegurui	Itsuki Sumeragi		
2018–2021	Kiratto Pri Chan	Sara Midorikawa		
2018	Beatless	Olga Suguri		
2018	Wise Man's Grandchild	Maria von Messina		
2019	Yatogame-chan Kansatsu Nikki	Mai Tadakusa		
2021	Let's Make a Mug Too	Naoko Naruse		
2022	Teppen—!!!	Hikari Jogasaki		
2024	My Wife Has No Emotion	Mamoru		
2025	Bullet/Bullet	Rin		
2025	Let This Grieving Soul Retire!	Mary Auden		
2025	Princession Orchestra	Riku Sorano		
2025	Witch Watch	Miharu Kiryu		
2026	Tune In to the Midnight Heart	Aiko		
2026	The Salty Koharu Has a Soft Spot for Me	Madoka Murasaki		

=== Original net animation ===
Year	Title	Role	Notes	Ref
2021	Oshiete Hokusai!: The Animation	Kanon Kano		

=== Film animation ===
Year	Title	Role	Notes	Ref
2015	PriPara the Movie: Minna Atsumare! Prism Tours	Leona West		
2019	King of Prism: Shiny Seven Stars	Yurari Saionji		
2025	Aikatsu! x PriPara: The Movie – Miraculous Meeting	Leona West		

=== Video games ===
Year	Title	Role	Notes	Ref
2015	Kobayashi ga Kawai Sugite Tsurai!! Ge-mu demo Kyun Moe MAX ga Tomaranai	Tomo-chan		
2015	Xuccess Heaven	White Academy student		
2026	Nekopara: Sekai Connect	Ackee		

=== Stage musical ===
Year	Title	Role	Notes	Ref
2016	PriPara: Minna ni Todoke	Leona West		
