= Wise Man's Grandchild =

Japanese light novel series and its franchise

- First light novel volume cover featuring Maria von Messina (bottom left), Sicily von Claude (left), Shin Wolford (right), and Alice Corner (far right)

賢者の孫 (Kenja no Mago)
- Genre: Fantasy, isekai
- Novel series
- Written by: Tsuyoshi Yoshioka
- Published by: Shōsetsuka ni Narō
- Original run: 2015 – 2022
- Light novel
- Written by: Tsuyoshi Yoshioka
- Illustrated by: Seiji Kikuchi
- Published by: Enterbrain
- Imprint: Famitsu Bunko
- Original run: July 30, 2015 – November 29, 2022
- Volumes: 17 + 2 Extra + 1 SP + 1 Bonus
- Manga
- Written by: Tsuyoshi Yoshioka
- Illustrated by: Shunsuke Ogata
- Published by: Kadokawa Shoten
- Magazine: Young Ace Up
- Original run: March 2016 – present
- Volumes: 29
- Manga

Wise Man's Grandchild SP
- Written by: Tsuyoshi Yoshioka
- Illustrated by: Shūji Nishizawa
- Published by: Kadokawa Shoten
- Magazine: Young Ace Up
- Original run: July 2019 – July 2022
- Volumes: 4
- Anime television series
- Directed by: Masafumi Tamura
- Produced by: Takashi Tachizaki; Tomoyuki Oowada; Kazusa Umeda; Aya Iizuka; Mieko Tsuruta; Seiichi Kawashima; Kazuto Matsumura; Daisuke Iwasaki; Osao Kumamoto
- Written by: Tatsuya Takahashi
- Music by: Kow Otani
- Studio: Silver Link
- Licensed by: Crunchyroll (Note: In North America through Crunchyroll, LLC (formerly known as Funimation).)
- Original network: AT-X, ABC TV, Tokyo MX, BS11
- Original run: April 10, 2019 – June 26, 2019
- Episodes: 12
- icon

Wise Man's Grandchild (賢者の孫, Kenja no Mago) is a Japanese light novel series written by Tsuyoshi Yoshioka and illustrated by Seiji Kikuchi. It began serialization online in January 2015 on the user-generated novel publishing website Shōsetsuka ni Narō. At the beginning of episode 311, in November 2022, it was announced that episode would be the last posted on Shōsetsuka ni Narō. It was acquired by Enterbrain, which has published seventeen volumes since July 2015 under their Famitsu Bunko imprint.

A manga adaptation with illustrations by Shunsuke Ogata began serialization on Kadokawa Shoten's Young Ace Up website in March 2016. It has been collected in twenty-nine tankōbon volumes.

An anime television series adaptation by Silver Link aired from April to June 2019.

== Plot ==
A young salaryman who died in an accident was reborn in another world filled with magic and demons. As a baby, he was picked up by the patriot hero "Sage" Merlin Wolford and was given the name Shin. He was raised as a grandson and soaked up Merlin's teachings, earning him some irresistible powers. However, when Shin became 15, Merlin realized, "I forgot to teach him common sense!" Diseum, king of the Earlshide Kingdom, recommends Shin to attend his Magic Academy, on the condition of not using Shin for political warfare. In the capital, Shin rescues two girls, Maria and Sizilien, from thugs, and later he inaugurates a club that consists of him and others.

== Characters ==
=== Ultimate Magic Research Society ===
Shin Wolford (シン=ウォルフォード, Shin Worufōdo)
Voiced by: Yūsuke Kobayashi (Japanese); Daman Mills, Alison Viktorin (child) (English)
A Japanese salaryman who worked for a science textbook publisher was killed by a truck and reborn into another world with his memories intact. Upon arriving in the new world, which was full of magic, he was raised and trained by Merlin Wolford, Melida Bowen, and Michel Collins, thereby making his magical and combat skills beyond S-rank. Shin can also create and modify magical gear to what can be considered National Treasure–level equipment. Being raised in the woods, however, his social and worldly skills are a bit lacking, though only by the standards of his new world. He has the leadership of his own Ultimate Magic Research Society and effortlessly tops S-rank. Sicily was enamored with Shin from their first meeting and is overjoyed when she becomes his fiancée. Like his grandfather, Shin can cast magic without verbal or somatic components (since he considers spoken spell names embarrassing) and has created many unique spells like the gate and extra-dimensional storage spaces. His element compresses in water and heat, and his strongest attack is the Hydrogen Bomb. Based on the recollection of his previous world, Shin's knowledge of science and astronomy revolutionize the world's magic tools. Over the summer break, Shin and his grandparents perform intensive training with the Ultimate Magic Research Society to prepare for massive demon outbreaks while deployed in a special unit called the Ultimate Magicians, hopefully, to prevent other academy students from getting conscripted into war. Soon afterward, Shin's (Earth-modern) appliances prompted him to open his own shopping mall. Years later, Shin and Sicily would have a daughter named Charlotte alongside her adoptive demon-hybrid brother, Silver. His title is Demon Lord, which he does not like.
August von Earlshide (アウグスト=フォン=アールスハイド, Augusuto fon Ārusuhaido)
Voiced by: Shōhei Komatsu (Japanese); Brandon McInnis (English)
The son of King Diseum and invested as the crown prince, he also goes by "Aug" or "Gus" to his friends. He is respected by his peers and, like his father, considers one's abilities to take precedence over their peerage, but does not use his influence unless necessary. Aug inherited his father's traits. Shin and Aug have a cousin-like relationship. Aug enjoys watching when Shin gets in over his head during social actions and likes to tease Shin to act on his plan. He also keeps Shin prudent from introducing new magic and tools that would throw the world out of balance. Aug's childhood friends, Julius and Thor, feel pressured because he talks to Shin casually. Even Elizabeth is irritated by their closeness until Aug eases her mind when he provokes Shin to confess to Sicily. He felt absolute fury when a corrupted Pope dared to come between Shin and Sicily. August and Elizabeth soon wed following Shin and Sicily's. Aug still kept tabs on anyone who saw his best friend's unbalanced power as a threat. He acquired the title 'Thunder God' after electrocuting a giant crocodile and is the 2nd S-rank.
Maria von Messina (マリア=フォン=メッシーナ, Maria fon Messhīna)
Voiced by: Yuki Wakai (Japanese); Katelyn Barr (English)
A red-haired second daughter of a Countess and is a friend to Sicily. Maria is a very upfront and vocal lady; she is also an obsessive fangirl of Merlin and Melida. She teases Sicily over her crush on Shin and tries to offer her support in their relationship. Due to her indifference, Shin does not treat her like a nobleman's daughter. Her title is Valkyrie and is the 3rd S-rank. She does not like her title, as it implies she will be a virgin for the rest of her life and never get married.
Sicily von Claude (シシリー=フォン=クロード, Shishirī fon Kurōdo)
Voiced by: Rina Honnizumi (Japanese); Lindsay Seidel (English)
A beautiful, timid, soft-spoken girl with waist-length blue hair who is called a Saint, and is the third daughter and fourth child of the Viscount Claude, who works at the Finance Bureau. She gets her looks from her mother. Her eldest sibling is her brother Royce, the heir presumptive of the noble house, along with her two sisters Cecilia and Sylvia, who both work for the Royal Magic Division. Sicily is unassuming with what many consider the loveliest features. She is smitten with Shin the first time she meets him after he rescues her and Maria from a group of thugs. As she and Shin started going out, she tended to be a little aggressive towards him and others. Sicily excels in healing magic, and thanks to Shin's tutoring, her forte is now only second best to Shin's. She is the 4th S-rank and received the title 'Holy Maiden' for being a savior of Swedes Kingdom civilians, increasing her popularity, including her and Shin's engagement. She's now targeted by Zest and his scouts, as she is deemed to be Shin's weakness. After the demonoid arc, Sicily happily married Shin at the Gospel Cathedral and adopted Silver as their own son (hiding the fact that it's Schtrom's).
Alice Corner (アリス=コーナー, Arisu Kōnā)
Voiced by: Miyu Kubota (Japanese); Kristin Sutton (English)
A perky blonde girl who has an upbeat, yet childish, personality, and her father is an accountant of the Hague Company. Despite being considered an adult (15) Alice is also the smallest physically. She is marked 5th S-rank. Alice's father accepted the position of President at the Wolford Company. After seeing many of her friends getting impressive titles, she asked for one as well, she got one, and it is called 'Eradication Magical <Petite> Girl', a title which she does not really like at all.
Thor von Flegel (トール=フォン=フレーゲル, Tōru fon Furēgeru)
Voiced by: Arisa Shida (Japanese); Morgan Berry (English)
A childhood friend of Prince August and acts as one of his escorts with seriousness. Thor has silver-colored hair and eyeglasses. He is the eldest son of a Baron. Thor longs to be knighted, though some people are puzzled by his appearance. Initially, he and Julius do not chat equally with Aug, until seeing him and Shin interacting without any care of their status, and gains more confidence over time. His fiancee is comedically much taller than him, but they have a close bond. He is marked 6th S-rank. Julius mentions that during Thor's younger years, Thor was often mistaken for a girl, something that causes him a great deal of embarrassment.
Lynn Hughes (リン=ヒューズ, Rin Hyūzu)
Voiced by: Megumi Yamaguchi (Japanese); Madeleine Morris (English)
A petite girl who is slightly taller than Alice and sporting glasses, her father is a court magician. Lynn is excited to gather magic when it comes to Shin's tutelage. Due to her uncontrollable magic, Shin dubs her the "Unbridled Magical Girl", something she appears to be delighted with, though it wasn't a compliment. Given the name, she is marked as 7th S-rank.
Yuri Carlton (ユーリ=カールトン, Yūri Kāruton)
Voiced by: Juri Nagatsuma (Japanese); Morgan Garrett (English)
A curvaceous figure student whose family runs an inn. She is personally taught by her idol Melida, making her hailed as the "Guru's Successor". Yuri dresses in her shirt, which hangs loosely and slightly exposes her large breasts. While not spoken, her risqué dressing manner implies Yuri is "experienced"; backed up by the fact that she didn't bat an eye at Olivia explaining how to tell if a girl recently lost her virginity. Her specialty is Enchantment magic. She is marked as 8th S-rank.
Tony Freyd (トニー=フレイド, Tonī Fureido)
Voiced by: Chiaki Kobayashi (Japanese); Matt Shipman (English)
A handsome boy from a family of knights; however, he decided to attend an academy for magicians. Tony is a laid-back person who usually just goes with the flow. He does not respect the environment of knights and is more interested in flirting with girls. He chose to attend the Magic Academy over the Knight Academy due to the larger number of girls at the Magic Academy. However, he settles on a serious girlfriend, having earned her respect and affection, after ditching the playboy routine. Tony is one of the few magicians who excelled in swordplay other than Shin. He is marked 9th S-rank. He acquired the title 'Knight Magician' after he defeated a giant demon deer with magic and swordsmanship.
Julius von Littenheim (ユリウス=フォン=リッテンハイム, Yuriusu fon Rittenhaimu)
Voiced by: Keisuke Komoto (Japanese); Jarrod Greene (English)
Also a childhood friend of Prince August and serves as his escort along with Thor. Julius has a muscular body and is the eldest son of a Duke. His relationship with Aug is similar to Thor's and changes afterward. Julius also speaks in a samurai tone that Shin mistakes him for a real knight until he invites the whole group to his family beach resort. He is marked as 10th S-rank.
Mark Bean (マーク=ビーン, Māku Bīn)
Voiced by: Shōta Hayama (Japanese); Orion Pitts (English)
He is a sporting boy being in a family that works as blacksmiths. Mark is Olivia's boyfriend. He is good friends with the S-class regardless of being a newcomer. His father is a strict man who keeps his staff organized, although he immediately results in politeness to the nobility, such as August or Shin. Mark is willing to implement Shin's ideas of inventing detached swords and wireless communication devices empowered with his manmade gem stones. Originally an A-class student, he qualified to be in Shin's club by making an inter-dimensional storage space. Mark's magic has improved so much from Shin's tutoring that he and Olivia are officially placed in the S-class, ranking 11th and 12th, respectively.
Olivia Stone (オリビア=ストーン, Oribia Sutōn)
Voiced by: Saya Satō (Japanese); Bryn Apprill (English)
She is an attractive lady whose family runs a popular restaurant and is Mark's girlfriend. Olivia started as an A-class student along with Mark. She and Mark are the only other students in the Academy able to create an inter-dimensional storage space, thereby being able to join Shin's club activity. Olivia and Mark have since been upgraded to S-class due to having improved their magical powers. She is the only member of the Ultimate Magicians to lack a title, reflecting how Olivia doesn't stand out. However, she is the easiest one to meet, when serving customers at her restaurant.

=== Supporting characters ===
Merlin Wolford (マーリン=ウォルフォード, Mārin Worufōdo)
Voiced by: Yusaku Yara (Japanese); R. Bruce Elliott, Austin Tindle (young) (English)
The Wise Man and adopted grandfather of Shin. A hero of the Kingdom whose magic and skills are considered legendary especially when he and Melida (whom he was married to at the time) slew the Demonoid king. Everywhere they go they have rabid fans pursuing them and are considered the epitome of greatness. However, while teaching Shin magic and combat, his training in common sense and otherworldly events was a bit sparse.
Melida Bowen (メリダ=ボーウェン, Merida Bōwen)
Voiced by: Gara Takashima (Japanese); Cynthia Cranz, Mallorie Rodak (young) (English)
The Great Guru and ex-wife to Merlin. Melida helped raise Shin and taught him the skill of gear creation, being one of the greatest creators of all time. While stern, she cares greatly for Shin and is always amazed when he does something inventive; if not angered, as Shin has a tendency to do things without thinking about them responsibly. She also is working to teach Shin some common sense and ensure he is not taken advantage of.
Diseum von Earlshide (ディセウム=フォン=アールスハイド, Diseumu fon Ārusuhaido)
Voiced by: Mitsuaki Hoshino (Japanese); Philip Weber (English)
The current king of the Earlshide Kingdom. Diseum's personality is lax, and he prefers to be called Uncle Dis by Shin, as he himself sees Shin as his own nephew. In his days at the Magic Academy, the student body was conscripted in the subjugation of the first Demonoid. The calamity brought near extinction to the Earlshide Kingdom and Diseum witnessed it all till Merlin and Melida arrived to combat and defeat the threat. Since then, Diseum befriended the duo after they were hailed as heroes. After Diseum graduated from the academy, he accompanied Merlin Wolford and Melinda Bowen to live a vagabond life. Because he was treated as an apprentice or, rather, a maid, the two treat him with little respect. Apparently, at that time, because he left his position as the Crown Prince behind, Julia, who was his fiancée at that time, still can't get over that fact.
Elizabeth von Koralle (エリザベート=フォン=コーラレ, Erizabēto fon Kōrare)
Voiced by: Nozomi Kimura (Japanese); Margaret McDonald (English)
She is the second daughter of Duke Koralle and the Fiancée of Prince August. She claims to have no magical abilities.
May von Earlshide (メイ=フォン=アールスハイド, Mei fon Ārusuhaido)
Voiced by: Maya Hinanogi (Japanese); Brittany Lauda (English)
Princess May is the 10-year-old daughter of King Diseum and August's little sister; she is a big fan of Melida and gets mad at August for not bringing her with him. When she is finally able to learn under Melida and Merlin, she turns out to be a prodigy.
Michel Collins (ミッシェル=コーリング, Missheru Kōringu)
Voiced by: Yoshihisa Kawahara (Japanese); Christopher R. Sabat (English)
The former general of the Knight Order of the Earlshide Kingdom. He took up residence in the woods after retiring. Michel is a strict instructor, each time he learns that Shin has done something uncommon; he would level up the kind of martial arts training for the latter. Michel was renowned as the Sword Saint.
Siegfried Marquez (ジークフリード=マルケス, Jīkufurīdo Marukesu)
Voiced by: Makoto Kaneko (Japanese); Z. Charles Bolton (English)
Sieg is one of the court magicians and Diseum's personal bodyguards. Sieg's good-looking and has an easy-going personality, Siegfried and Christina always argue. He and Shin treat each other as brothers.
Christina Hayden (クリスティーナ=ヘイデン, Kurisutīna Heiden)
Voiced by: Aoi Koga (Japanese); Kara Edwards (English)
Chris is one of the Imperial Knights and acts as Diseum's escort. She is a kind person but undesirably an unsociable one. Siegfried and Christina often quarrel. Shin views Chris as a big sister.
Karen von Kleine
A daughter of a Baroness who is Thor's fiancée. She is two years older than Thor and everyone else with waist-length light brown hair. Due to their differences in height, Karen describes Thor as her little brother and her as the big sister. Thor's head is about chest high on Karen.
Sara von Campbell
A daughter of a Count who is Julius' fiancée. She has blonde hair with blue eyes and is described as "looking like a model" (in the web novel), so Shin even thinks of her as a foreign samurai. Sara was initially disappointed in Julius joining the magic division instead of a warrior until he extolled as a hero.
Lilia Jackson
Lilia is a student of the Higher Economics Law Academy and Tony's steady girlfriend. She has a serious personality and idolizes Melida to the point that she mimics her style in fashion. Down to her having naturally red hair tied in a ponytail and glasses, just like how Melida is seen in some of her paintings of her. Unlike other females, she rejects Tony's advances but changes her mind when he shows how serious he is about ending his playboy antics.
Miranda Wallace
Voiced by: Yoshi Namami (Japanese); Sara Ragsdale (English)
A student at the Knight Military Institute who joined at the same time Shin joined the Magic Academy. Miranda first runs into the future Ultimate Magicians during the joint training between the Magic Academy and Knight Military Institute. She is initially prideful, taking the normal opinion of knights being better than magicians that were common amongst the knights. She quickly learns better when Shin and the others save her and her classmates. When she first meets the magicians, she is a second seat, meaning the second-best student at the Knights Military Institute, but later in the manga becomes the second girl in history to become the best student at the academy.
In the manga, Miranda was one of the first volunteers to join the expedition into the Demon Lands and earned the (unofficial) title "Hunter" for defeating a super catastrophe Class Rhino. She is also one of the first knights to incorporate Shin's vibration sword and jet boots into her fighting style. Shin eventually creates a custom sword (The Devil Cleansing Bastard Sword) with greater length to allow Miranda to fight against magic users and demonoids. She becomes Maria's demon-hunting partner, and shares many of Maria's frustrations with romance. Late into the manga, she becomes a student of Michel Collins.

=== Demonoids ===
Kurt von Rietsburg (カート=フォン=リッツバーグ, Kāto fon Rittsubāgu)
Voiced by: Daisuke Masuoka (Japanese); Dallas Reid (English)
The oldest child of a Count, he is an arrogant noble-class student who considers anyone not noble unworthy. Kurt tries to use his status as leverage to get what he wants, which is against the school rules and royal law. For being placed in A-class, he is jealous of Shin, thinking he cheated to become the top student and taking a position in S-class that should belong to him. However, he was not always this way, but after a visit to Oliver's lab, he started acting like this. His hatred and influence stem from Oliver causing him to become a demonoid who attacks the school, forcing Shin to kill him in order to protect the campus. After Kurt's death, the House of Rietsburg was at first under observation but after Schtrom's confession that he had used Kurt as a guinea pig, they were not charged with any crimes and were treated as victims instead. Despite this, his father who was the Vice Minister of the Finance Bureau resigned in grief.
Oliver Schtrom (オリバー=シュトローム, Oribā Shutorōmu)
Voiced by: Toshiyuki Morikawa (Japanese); J. Michael Tatum (English)
Oliver is the quintessential villain of the series who is a demonoid with the appearance of a young man with long silver hair and red eyes. Former known as Oliveira von Schtradius head Duke of a royal family from the Bluesphere Empire. He was a devoted husband to his pregnant wife Aria, and spent his time in relation with commoners and Earlshide's nobles, improving his citizens' livelihood. The admiration ignites jealousy to feudal lords having to prohibit people from migrating there, which evidently did not concern them. The lords framed Oliver as a human abductor that led the citizens into burning his house and killing his pregnant wife. Despite the citizens begging for Oliver's forgiveness after realizing they were duped, he in his midst of despair demonized and unleash a fiery magic explosion, wiping out the whole territory. He poses as a middle school professor in Earlshide to concoct illicit research. After concluding his experiment of demonizing Kurt a success, and coincidentally facing Shin in a one-on-one match, Oliver takes revenge by overthrowing the Bluesphere Empire and transforming the citizens into demonoids who share his principles. Regardless of having no further goals, Oliver attempts to erase Shin, seeing him as his greatest threat. Oliver nearly took Sicily's life in the decisive battle to ignite Shin's spirit; however, Shin has sustain better control of his subconscious at this point and focus his ultimate spell to purge Oliver's suffering and declared the war over.
Zest (ゼスト, Zesuto)
Voiced by: Kenjiro Tsuda (Japanese); Ben Phillips (English)
The Bluesphere Empire's former captain of the Intelligence Department and spymaster. Despite his callous and calculating demeanor, Zest cared for all of his subordinates' well-being and the families of the deceased. Zest originally served higher-ups consistently to request aid and support, until finding the nobles tormenting a young sister of a deceased subordinate of his, just to save themselves from expenses; this came to a head when Oliver offered him and his loyal subordinates the means to become demonoids to punish those who have wronged them. Feeding false information to initiate a war against the Earlshide Kingdom so that Oliver could usurp the Empire with all defenses down, this plan was ultimately successful. When Oliver showed disinterest in doing anything else; however, after learning about Oliver's fight with Shin, Zest grew concerned that someone can withstand Oliver. Behind Oliver's back, Zest decided to go after Shin or demonize him over to their side. Zest eventually faces Shin's group at their headquarters where he meets his end.
Miria (ミリア, Miria)
Voiced by: Sayaka Ohara (Japanese); Tabitha Ray (English)
Oliver's retainer whom he took in because of her resemblance to his late wife. Miria is a commoner and worked as an exceptional hunter until she rejected a noble's marriage proposal which resulted in her family getting burned down in greed. Coincidentally, Oliver killed the evil nobles involved and rescued Miria. She tends to Oliver's injuries following his fight with Shin. She is in love with Oliver and one day wants to have a child with him; however, Oliver seems not to reciprocate those feelings back. She willingly chose to be a demonoid and has had combat training and can keep up with Shin in a fight. Miria has secretly bored a son named Silver whom she humbly requested Shin and Sicily to adopt upon her demise.
Lawrence (ローレンス, Larry)
A demonoid primarily part of Zest's division. Lawrence started as an orphan putting up with those that stand on top not offering donations. Skilled for an informant, he and others took shelter in a church until a nasty viscount expelled them claiming those without money are "rats". Upon meeting Zest and seeking recruitment, Lawrence accepts the job afterwards in the Intelligence Unit. In the fight against Aug whom he believes is as vexing alike the nobles. Wishing to be reborn where one takes pride in being humanity protector.
Amelia
A human-turned-demon who can slash her adversaries in an instant. Her forte in embedding steel wires with invisibility magic comes from her time as a hunter. In those days, she was part of the Bluesphere Empire Hunter Association in exterminating herds of demon beasts, though treated indifferently by males. One day, Amelia and her party members discover that their chief client was auctioning slave girls, including her long-lost younger sister Rinon. After slaughtering the wicked nobles, Amelia became a fugitive and ends Rinon's life at her request. When the war against the Ultimate Magicians breakout, Amelia is seen at a fort and then goes head-to-head with Maria. She remarks that nobles are unwilling to help anyone, to which Maria pities her. Maria overturns her in defeat and Amelia dies with pride.

== Media ==
=== Light novel ===
Tsuyoshi Yoshioka originally started the series as a web novel. The series was acquired for print publication by Enterbrain, who published the first light novel on July 30, 2015.

No.	Release date	ISBN
1	July 30, 2015	978-4-04-730586-1
2	October 30, 2015	978-4-04-730766-7
3	February 29, 2016	978-4-04-730977-7
4	July 30, 2016	978-4-04-734219-4
5	November 30, 2016	978-4-04-734349-8
6	March 30, 2017	978-4-04-734540-9
7	September 30, 2017	978-4-04-734777-9
8	March 30, 2018	978-4-04-735053-3
9	December 29, 2018	978-4-04-735427-2
10	June 29, 2019	978-4-04-735671-9
11	October 30, 2019	978-4-04-735758-7
12	March 30, 2020	978-4-04-736024-2
13	September 30, 2020	978-4-04-736186-7
14	March 30, 2021	978-4-04-736507-0
15	September 30, 2021	978-4-04-736780-7
16	February 28, 2022	978-4-04-736930-6
17	November 29, 2022	978-4-04-737234-4

=== Manga ===
A manga adaptation, illustrated by Shunsuke Ogata began serialization on Kadokawa Shoten's Young Ace Up website since March 2016. Twenty-nine tankōbon volumes have been released as of October 2, 2026.

A spin-off manga illustrated by Shūji Nishizawa, titled Wise Man's Grandchild SP, was serialized on Young Ace Up from July 2019 to July 2022 issues and collected into four volumes. The spin-off is centered around May von Earlshide.

No.	Release date	ISBN
1	November 26, 2016	978-4-0410-5036-1
2	February 25, 2017	978-4-0410-5536-6
3	April 25, 2017	978-4-0410-5537-3
4	July 25, 2017	978-4-0410-5786-5
5	October 24, 2017	978-4-0410-5787-2
6	February 2, 2018	978-4-0410-5789-6
7	July 3, 2018	978-4-0410-6931-8
8	October 4, 2018	978-4-0410-6932-5
9	December 29, 2018	978-4-0410-6933-2
10	March 30, 2019	978-4-0410-6934-9
11	April 26, 2019	978-4-0410-8121-1
12	September 10, 2019	978-4-0410-8122-8
13	February 4, 2020	978-4-0410-8123-5
14	July 10, 2020	978-4-0410-8124-2
15	October 10, 2020	978-4-0410-9900-1
16	February 10, 2021	978-4-0410-9917-9
17	July 9, 2021	978-4-0411-1470-4
18	November 9, 2021	978-4-0411-1471-1
19	March 10, 2022	978-4-0411-1472-8
20	September 9, 2022	978-4-04-112620-2
21	February 10, 2023	978-4-04-113256-2
22	June 9, 2023	978-4-04-113697-3
23	December 7, 2023	978-4-04-114242-4
24	April 9, 2024	978-4-04-114643-9
25	October 10, 2024	978-4-04-115271-3
26	March 10, 2025	978-4-04-115798-5
27	August 7, 2025	978-4-04-116417-4
28	February 10, 2026	978-4-04-117002-1
29	October 2, 2026	978-4-04-117695-5

=== Anime ===
An anime adaptation of the series was announced in September 2017. The anime, which was later confirmed to air on television, was directed by Masafumi Tamura and written by Tatsuya Takahashi, featuring animation by Silver Link with character designs by Yuki Sawairi and music by Kow Otani. The series aired from April 10 to June 26, 2019, on AT-X, ABC, Tokyo MX and BS11. i☆Ris performed the series' opening theme song "Ultimate☆Magic", while Nanami Yoshi sang the series' ending theme song "Attoteki Vivid Days."

Funimation licensed the series and produced an English dub. Following Sony's acquisition of Crunchyroll, the dub was moved to Crunchyroll.

No.	Title (Note: All English titles are taken from Funimation.)	Original air date
1	"A Babe in the Woods Goes to the Capital"; Transliteration: "Seken Shirazu, Ō Miyako ni Tatsu" (Japanese: 世間知らず、王都に立つ)	April 10, 2019
A Japanese salaryman is hit by a truck and reincarnated as a baby in a world filled with magic. He is taken in by the wizard Merlin Wolford who names him Shin and raises him as his grandson. As Shin grows he is taught magic by Merlin, magical item craftsmanship by Merlin's friend Melida and swordplay by the warrior Michael. At age 10 Shin successfully slays a demon so Merlin tells him about finding him in the forest, but Shin already knew this as he has memories from his previous life. At age 15 Merlin realises he never taught Shin common sense life skills. He is also hesitant to let Shin enter society as Shin has been using his previous life's scientific knowledge to invent spells that could turn society upside down. While discussing the issue Shin learns his uncle Dis, big brother Sieg and big sister Chris are actually King Diseum of Earlshied, Christina of the Royal Guard and Siegfried the Court Magician, all old friends of Merlin. It is decided Shin will attend Earlshied Magic Academy to learn about society and make friends, so they move to a house in the city. While exploring Shin saves two girls from thugs and, having never met girls his own age, is immediately smitten with one of them.
2	"The Unconventional New Student"; Transliteration: "Jōshikiyaburi no Shinnyūsei" (Japanese: 常識破りの新入生)	April 17, 2019
The girls, Maria and Sizilien, also hope to join the academy. Sizilien, whom Shin is smitten with, also develops a crush on him. Shin earns the enmity of Kurt, who leaves after being scolded by August, King Diseum's son, Shin's cousin. Shin comes first in the exam and has to give a speech. Kurt is furious to discover he is in A class while Shin made it to the higher S class. Shin makes changes to the protective spells on his academy uniform. Sizilien confides to Shin she has repeatedly rejected Kurt who is now threatening her. August uses his royal status to force Kurt to leave. Shin invites everyone to his home to ask Merlin and Melida if he can alter Sizilien's uniform to protect her against Kurt. Melida reveals this would make Sizilien's uniform a National Treasure level item. Sizilien tries to refuse, proving to Melida she is honest and worthy of the protection. Diseum asks Shin to never reveal he can create National Treasure items or it could lead to inter-kingdom war, though he does ask for uniforms for August, Julius and Thor. Maria sensibly refuses one. Shin offers to take everyone home using his teleportation spell which was also supposed to stay secret.
3	"An Emergency Arises!"; Transliteration: "Kinkyū jitai hassei!" (Japanese: 緊急事態発生！)	April 24, 2019
Shin starts escorting Sizilien to and from school. Shin decides not to join any clubs so August suggests he start his own, which the entire class insists on joining, so the Ultimate Magic Study Group is formed. Diseum's council discuss the increase in demon sightings, so Diseum orders an investigation. Kurt's father confronts Kurt about his behaviour. Kurt snaps and rants about the worthlessness of commoners and his hatred of Shin, so his father withdraws him from the academy. August wonders why Kurt changed so radically and Thor reveals Kurt's behaviour changed after visiting Mr Schtrom, a blind teacher who was exiled from another kingdom. Schtrom visits Kurt and casts a spell on him. Shin accidentally reveals another secret when he tells his friends he killed a demon when he was 10. Shin suddenly senses a demon before Kurt appears and tries to kill them all, having transformed into a Demonoid. Shin forces everyone else to run while he faces Kurt, hoping he can destroy the demon magic while sparing Kurt, but when Kurt begins a spell that would destroy the entire Academy Shin is forced to kill him by severing his head. August warns him destroying a Demonoid will make him famous and his life very difficult for the foreseeable future.
4	"The Name of the Instigator"; Transliteration: "Kuromaku no Na wa" (Japanese: 黒幕の名は)	May 1, 2019
Shin theorises Kurt was a victim of human experimentation. Diseum presents Shin a medal for destroying Kurt. Merlin is angered Diseum is involving Shin in politics, but accepts it is necessary. Shin's fame means his tutors have to test students wanting to join his study group to keep membership manageable. Diseum explains to his council Shin's theory Kurt was artificial. Two students manage to join Shin's group, Mark son of a blacksmith and Olivia daughter of a restaurant owner. Shin asks Mark to upgrade his sword to better handle his enchantments. The Security Bureau investigates Schtrom who expresses remorse at Kurt's death. The investigators invite him to help by studying Kurt's corpse but once at the castle the investigators reveal Kurt's name was never made public. Exposed, Schtrom destroys part of the castle. Shin engages him in a duel that destroys Schtrom's mask, revealing he is not blind but has Demonoid eyes. Shin casts a heat ray spell so hot it turns the sand floor to glass, leaving Shin unsure if Schtrom disintegrated or escaped. Diseum's council congratulates him on his victory, and though he tries to explain his heat ray spell, they have no idea what he is talking about. Schtrom is revealed to have escaped and survived.
5	"A Pioneering New Hero"; Transliteration: "Hatenkōna Shineiyū" (Japanese: 破天荒な新英雄)	May 8, 2019
Melida is concerned Shin and Sizilien are not yet a couple. Shin shares his concern Schtrom is alive so August pays Mark's father to design a new sword. The king of Blusfia learns from Zest, his spy, Earlshied is troubled by demons and plan to invade. Shin decides to buy Sizilien a ring, flustering her, until he reveals it is for another defence enchantment, angering his friends at his idiocy. Diseum presents Shin his medal in a public ceremony while also promising Shin will never be used in politics or war. Shin decides to help his friends "level up" but struggles since casting his spells requires understanding of science his friends don't possess. Schtrom and his subordinate Miria are shown secretly manipulating Blusfia's king. Shin's friends are inspired when Merlin explains it is possible to learn Shin's spells, showing he can now use Shin's teleportation spell. Shin collects his new sword which features a detachable blade to make replacing it easier if it breaks. August wonders if the design can be used by the military to cut down costs, especially with war against Blusfia approaching. Despite Diseum's promise Shin decides he will join the war if necessary to protect his family and friends.
6	"Outbreak of War and a Joint Training Exercise"; Transliteration: "Kaisen to Gōdō Kunren" (Japanese: 開戦と合同訓練)	May 15, 2019
Earlshied defeats Blusfia's army. Schtrom kills the king and destroys Blusfia, passing a message to Diseum's council he destroyed Blusfia and turned a dozen of its strongest magicians into Demonoids under his control. Diseum declares academy students must train alongside students of the Knight Military Institute, upsetting everyone as Knight Students are notorious bullies. Shin forms a team with August, Sizilien, Maria and four Knights, Kreis, Miranda, Neun and Kent. Fed up of the Knight's attitudes August orders Shin to let the Knights fight demons without them. Shin learns their team advisors are Siegfried and Christina. After finding a boar demon the Knights are swiftly defeated, forcing Shin to save them by severing the boars head. The Knights realise how much they still have to learn and how important support from a magician is. Sizilien heals their wounds, causing the three Knight boys to develop crushes on her, causing Shin, Maria and Miranda to become jealous. More demons attack so an annoyed Shin destroys them all with a massive explosion spell. Impressed, Miranda apologises for being jealous of Shin's abilities, then apologises to Sizilien for insulting her boyfriend, causing massive embarrassment to both Shin and Sizilien who insists they are not dating yet.
7	"Let's Go to Camp!"; Transliteration: "Gasshuku ni ikō!" (Japanese: 合宿に行こう！)	May 22, 2019
The Knights and magicians start learning to fight together but the other Magician/Knight teams fail to get along. Shin feels guilty after learning that, having taught some of his spells to his study club, they will be forced to form a special team after graduation, under command of August, and will be supervised by the kingdom for the rest of their lives. However, the entire club is pleased since they view it as recognition of their abilities and a guaranteed career. Days later August tells them most of Blusfia has been destroyed and even more Demonoid's have been created from their population. Suspecting Schtrom is behind it Shin decides to put the club members through a training camp over summer break, with Sizilien offering use of a hot spring her family owns. Merlin and Melida insist on coming along as chaperones, not trusting boys and girls together without adult supervision. At the resort even Sizilien's family servants tease her about her future relationship with Shin. Merlin is happy to find Shin has made such excellent male friends. Melida amuses herself making the girls jealous about each other's breast sizes in the hot spring then declares she and Merlin are also going to train the club members to be as strong as possible.
8	"A Starlit Pledge"; Transliteration: "Hoshizora no Chikai" (Japanese: 星空の誓い)	May 29, 2019
Shin succeeds in making his explosion spell even stronger, earning punishment from Melida for his recklessness. August and Shin visit August's home and find August's fiancé Elizabeth and little sister May who are both furious August didn't invite them to meet Melida and now both insist on attending the training camp. Elizabeth admits she has an ulterior motive, to make sure Shin doesn't steal August from her, since Shin is all August talks about. August warns Shin that unless he confesses to Sizilien soon she may end up with someone else. Later, when Sizilien blurts out a desire to have children with Shin, he realises August is right and confesses his love to Sizilien who confesses she loves him too and becomes his girlfriend, though their first kiss is ruined when they realise all their friends, Merlin, Melida and Sizilien's servants were all spying on them. The next day Shin insists on training at the beach, using it as an excuse to play magicians volleyball. Late at night everyone reminisces about their childhoods, but when Melida bursts in to tell them to sleep they all hide. Shin accidentally leaps into Sizilien's bed to hide, her cries alerting Melida everyone is still awake so she lectures them mercilessly.
9	"The Grandchild, the Magic Gear, and the Engagement Party"; Transliteration: "Mago to Madō gu to Kon'yaku Hirō" (Japanese: 孫と魔道具と婚約披露)	June 5, 2019
Shin informs Sizilien's parents, Cecil and Eileen, they are dating. Cecil is overjoyed but Eileen warns him Sizilien being a Viscounts daughter comes with expectations, so Shin agrees to become Sizilien's fiancé. Merlin invites Elizabeth and May to Shin's training. Elizabeth admits she can't use magic but May shows potential. Schtrom's demons attack merchant caravans, disrupting the countries food supplies. Shin invents a spell that allows him to fly but again no-one understands his explanation. Melida and Merlin explain to Sizilien's parents Shin is not their biological grandson, but Cecil and Eileen reassure them they accept Shin for his character, not his bloodline. Shin creates even more National Treasure clothing to protect the club members on their next demon hunt. As May feels left out he creates a magical device to let her talk to them on the hunt, infuriating Melida that he has created yet another society altering device. Shin lets the club members do the fighting, proving they are now strong enough to kill demons without him. Shin and Sizilien attend a party to announce their engagement. Despite having gone through the formal process of engagement Shin waits until after the party to privately ask Sizilien to marry him with an engagement ring.
10	"The Fall of the Empire"; Transliteration: "Metsubō Suru Teikoku" (Japanese: 滅亡する帝国)	June 12, 2019
Schtrom completes his destruction of the Empire by demonising commoners who kill the nobility. With the Empire destroyed Schtrom claims he has achieved his goal and no longer needs an army, so he sets the Demonoids free. Miria questions his hatred of the Empire so Schtrom explains that he was a Lord of the Empire, but he disagreed with the Empire keeping slaves and made life for commoners as prosperous as possible. The other Lords hated him as most of their workforce moved to live on Schtrom's lands, reducing their tax profits, so King Herald framed Schtrom for kidnapping commoners living on his land to sell as slaves. The furious commoners set fire to Schtrom's home, killing his wife Aria and their unborn son. Fuelled by grief Schtrom demonised himself and swore to destroy the Blusfia Empire. Now having achieved his goal Schtrom becomes aimless. Zest sends his subordinate Lawrence to convince the Demonoids to attack Sweed Kingdom neighbouring Earlshied, hoping to draw Shin into a battle and provide Schtrom the new goal of destroying Shin. At a ceremony naming August as Diseum's official heir, news reaches them of the attack on Sweed. Shin announces he is renaming his club the Ultimate Magicians before they fly to Sweed.
11	"The Mightiest Corps of Magicians Ever"; Transliteration: "Shijō Saikyō no Mahōshi Shūdan" (Japanese: 史上最強の魔法師集団)	June 19, 2019
Shin and the Ultimate Magicians make it to Sweed in minutes instead of several days and begin slaughtering the shocked Demonoids while August gives a speech rallying Sweed's citizens and soldiers. During the battle the Magicians make several discoveries, that all the Demonoids are commoners of the destroyed Blusfia Empire, have somehow retained their sanity and all possess a hatred for the nobility. Sizilien busies herself healing the injured. Lawrence observes Shin in secret and is astounded by his magical abilities, coming to believe he might not have any weaknesses Schtrom can exploit. August and Maria face the Demonoids leader, Fabro, and eventually defeat him despite him using defensive magic items stolen from Sweed soldiers. With over a hundred Demonoids dead Lawrence is shocked not only at Shin's power, but also at the power of the Ultimate Magicians. Nearby, Zest wonders if he should reconsider manipulating Schtrom into fighting Shin, unsure if Schtrom would survive. Needing to save Lawrence and as many Demonoids as possible Zest asks Miria to intervene. Schtrom, who knew all along about Zest's plan, decides he might as well go along with it.
12	"And So, Off into the World..."; Transliteration: "Soshite, Sekai e..." (Japanese: そして、世界へ...)	June 26, 2019
With Miria as a distraction Lawrence and the Demonoids retreat. Sizilien fails to heal a man's injuries but Shin invents a multi-step healing spell, saving the man's life and leaving August wondering how powerful Shin is going to become. August requests Sweed form an alliance with Earlshied should either kingdom be attacked. August and Shin decide to travel to as many kingdoms as possible to form alliances and make it possible for Shin to teleport to any kingdom being attacked. Diseum is proud August intends to seek alliances with other kingdoms. Merlin and Melida tell Shin to keep August safe on his journey. Elizabeth and May insist on going too, as does every Ultimate Magician. Schtrom is irritated his subordinates lost to Shin but requests Miria keep him informed if their plan to conceive a baby together has been successful. Zest is unsure if he should be glad or afraid Schtrom has decided to make defeating Shin his new purpose. Shin and the Magicians set off for the next kingdom. Merlin and Melida realise they can fully relax for once, only for the Magicians to teleport back, revealing they intend to teleport back every night to save money on renting rooms for fourteen people.
