= Teppen—!!! =

Japanese manga series

- Cover of Teppen—!!! volume 1 by Bushiroad

てっぺんっ!!!
- Genre: Comedy
- Manga
- Written by: Inujun
- Illustrated by: Namamugi
- Published by: Bushiroad
- Magazine: Monthly Bushiroad
- Original run: January 8, 2021 – April 8, 2024
- Volumes: 5
- Anime television series

Teppen!!!!!!!!!!!!!!! Laughing 'til You Cry
- Directed by: Shinji Takamatsu (chief); Toshinori Watabe
- Written by: Jun Kumagai
- Music by: Technoboys Pulcraft Green-Fund
- Studio: Drive
- Licensed by: Crunchyroll
- Original network: Tokyo MX, BS-NTV, CTV, SUN, HTB, AT-X, HAB, KTN
- Original run: July 2, 2022 – September 24, 2022
- Episodes: 12
- icon

Teppen—!!! (てっぺんっ!!!; "Summit...!!!") is a Japanese manga series written by Inujun and illustrated by Namamugi, based on the Seiyū San-Shimai Team Y unit formed by voice actresses Mikoi Sasaki, Aimi, and Ayasa Itō. It has been serialized in Bushiroad's shōnen manga magazine Monthly Bushiroad since January 2021 and has been collected in five tankōbon volumes. An anime television series adaptation by Drive titled Teppen!!!!!!!!!!!!!!! Laughing 'til You Cry aired from July to September 2022.

== Plot ==
Yayoi Sakamoto and Yomogi Takahashi are two childhood friends who find themselves reunited as students at Kazuki High School in Namba, Osaka. The two were manzai fans during their childhood and aimed to become a manzai duo when they grew up. When the two discover a contest held by a local shopping district, the two decide to enter, hoping to further their comedy dreams. Not long after, they are joined by a third girl, Yuzu Hosono, with the three forming the comedy group Young Wai-wai, aiming to win the nationwide comedy contest Teppen Grand Prix.

== Characters ==
=== Young Wai-wai ===
Young Wai-Wai (ヤングワイワイ) is a manzai group that represents the Kansai region.

Yayoi Sakamoto (阪本 やよい, Sakamoto Yayoi)
Voiced by: Ayasa Itō
Yomogi Takahashi (高橋 よもぎ, Takahashi Yomogi)
Voiced by: Aimi
Yuzu Hosono (細野 ゆず, Hosono Yuzu)
Voiced by: Mikoi Sasaki

=== Celebri-Tea ===
Celebri-Tea (セレブリ茶) is a manzai group that represents the Tōkai region.

Mako Shirakabe (白壁 まこ, Shirakabe Mako)
Voiced by: Riko Kohara
Saeka Yabukita (藪北 さえか, Yabukita Saeka)
Voiced by: Saika Kitamori
Hikari Jogasaki (城ヶ崎 ひかり, Jōgasaki Hikari)
Voiced by: Yuki Wakai

=== Akudare Kingdom ===
Akudare О̄koku (あくだれ王国) is a manzai group that represents the Kantō region.

Hina Kasama (笠間 ひな, Kasama Hina)
Voiced by: Himari Hazuki
Miyu Komatsuzaki (小松崎 みゆ, Komatsuzaki Miyu)
Voiced by: Megu Sakuragawa
Misao Ushiku (牛久 みさお, Ushiku Misao)
Voiced by: Moe Toyota

=== Invaders ===
Shinryakusha (シンリャクシャ) is a manzai group that represents the Hokkaido area.

Yuina Rokkatei (六香亭 ゆいな, Rokkatei Yuina)
Voiced by: Nanae Kojima
Mone Ishiya (石屋 もね, Ishiya Mone)
Voiced by: Aina Suzuki
Chihori Hokuto (北斗 ちほり, Hokuto Chihori)
Voiced by: Momoyo Koyama

=== Bullet Kunoichi ===
Dangan Kunoichi (弾丸クノイチ) is a manzai group that represents the Kansai area.

Iroha Akishika (秋鹿 いろは, Akishika Iroha)
Voiced by: Honoka Kuroki
Kana Kiyotsuru (清鶴 かな, Kiyotsuru Kana)
Voiced by: Mayu Sagara
Chitose Amano (天野 ちとせ, Amano Chitose)
Voiced by: Aina Aiba

=== Other characters ===
Seiji Tani (谷 誠二, Tani Seiji)
Voiced by: Hiroki Yasumoto
Miki Takahashi (高橋 みき, Takahashi Miki)
Voiced by: Chiharu
Rine Takahashi (高橋 りね, Takahashi Rine)
Voiced by: Chiharu

== Media ==
=== Manga ===
The manga series is written by Inujun and illustrated by Namamugi and has been serialized in Bushiroad's shōnen manga magazine Monthly Bushiroad since January 2021. Three tankōbon volumes were released as of July 2022.

No.	Release date	ISBN
1	August 26, 2021	978-4-04-899490-3
2	January 20, 2022	978-4-04-899508-5
3	July 8, 2022	978-4-04-899527-6

=== Anime ===
Official Logo

An anime adaptation titled Teppen!!!!!!!!!!!!!!! Laughing 'til You Cry (the number of exclamation marks, apart from composing the Western official logo, each represent one main cast member) was announced on January 6, 2022. It is produced by Drive and directed by Toshinori Watanabe, with Shinji Takamatsu serving as chief director, Jun Kumagai writing and supervising scripts, Yoshiyuko Ōkubo designing the characters, and Technoboys Pulcraft Green-Fund composing the music. It aired from July 2 to September 24, 2022, on Tokyo MX, CTV, SUN, and HTB. The opening theme song is "Teppen — Tengoku Top of the Laugh!!!" by Teppen— All Stars, a unit composed of the 15 main cast members, while the ending theme song is "Ahatte Teppen" by May'n. Crunchyroll has licensed the series. The series' second episode was postponed from its original airing following the assassination of Shinzo Abe, and instead aired on September 10, 2022. A special episode funded by Minamishimabara City will be produced if funding is successful.

No.	Title	Original release date
1	"The Chicken Chapter"; Transliteration: "Chikin no Shō" (Japanese: チキンの章)	July 2, 2022
The high school girls' manzai comedy trio known as Young Wai Wai - Yayoi Sakamoto, Yomogi Takahashi, and Yuzu Hosono - was selected to participate in the final round of a comedy championship, the Teppen Grand Prix. As the last test before the finals, the group will have to live together with the other four comedy trios that had made it through the regional qualifying rounds at Takakoso, a historic student dormitory where previous generations of comedians have lived. They will have to overcome various ordeals imposed on them by the Teppen Grand Prix Committee as the last condition for participating in the finals.
2	"The Cattle Chapter"; Transliteration: "Kyataru no Shō" (Japanese: キャタルの章)	September 10, 2022 (Note: The airing of the second episode, originally scheduled for July 9, 2022, was canceled on July 8, 2022, following the assassination of Shinzo Abe, due to the plot of the episode revolving around an attempted assassination. The episode was rescheduled to air on September 10, 2022.)
3	"The Evil Magistrate Chapter"; Transliteration: "Aku Daikan no Shō" (Japanese: 悪代官の章)	July 16, 2022
Bullet Kunoichi and Akudare Kingdom win a raffle to appear on TV. When the two trios arrived at the filming location, they noticed something strange at the site. While a strange atmosphere was prevailing there, the producer of the program suddenly appeared and asked the girls to appear in a strange quiz show.
4	"The Salon Chapter"; Transliteration: "Saron no Shō" (Japanese: サロンの章)	July 23, 2022
5	"The Lamp Chapter"; Transliteration: "Ranpu no Shō" (Japanese: ランプの章)	July 30, 2022
6	"The Powder Chapter"; Transliteration: "Kona no Shō" (Japanese: 粉の章)	August 6, 2022
7	"The Mail-Order Chapter"; Transliteration: "Tsūhan no Shō" (Japanese: 通販の章)	August 13, 2022
8	"The Adult Meat Chapter"; Transliteration: "Otona no Niku no Shō" (Japanese: 大人の肉の章)	August 20, 2022
9	"The Adamski Chapter"; Transliteration: "Adamusukī no Shō" (Japanese: アダムスキーの章)	August 27, 2022
10	"The Piñata Chapter"; Transliteration: "Pinyāta no Shō" (Japanese: ピニャータの章)	September 3, 2022
11	"The Boss Battle Chapter"; Transliteration: "Rasu Bosu Kōrin no Sho" (Japanese: ラスボス降臨の章)	September 17, 2022
12	"The Laughter Chapter"; Transliteration: "Warai no Sho" (Japanese: 笑いの章)	September 24, 2022
