= Let's Make a Mug Too =

Japanese manga series

- Cover of Yaku nara Mug Cup mo volume 1 by Planet

やくならマグカップも (Yaku nara Magu Kappu mo)
- Manga
- Written by: Osamu Kashiwara
- Published by: Planet
- Original run: February 14, 2012 – present
- Volumes: 34
- Manga
- Written by: Osamu Kashiwara
- Published by: Akita Shoten
- Magazine: Manga Cross
- Original run: January 28, 2021 – August 25, 2022
- Volumes: 2
- Anime television series
- Directed by: Jun Kamiya
- Written by: Naruhisa Arakawa
- Music by: Tomoki Hasegawa
- Studio: Nippon Animation
- Licensed by: Crunchyroll (streaming); SA/SEA: Medialink
- Original network: CBC, Tokyo MX, BS11, MBS, AT-X
- Original run: April 3, 2021 – December 18, 2021
- Episodes: 24
- Original net animation

Rokurō no Dai Bōken
- Directed by: Tsutomu Yabuki
- Produced by: Kouichirou Itou; Saburō Ōmiya
- Studio: Planet Studio
- Released: April 1, 2024 – present
- Episodes: 7
- icon

Let's Make a Mug Too (やくならマグカップも, Yaku nara Magu Kappu mo; lit. "If planning to fire (pottery), mug cup too") is a Japanese manga series by Osamu Kashiwara about Mino ware pottery, set in the Tajimi city of Gifu Prefecture. It has been serialized online by Planet since February 2012, and has been collected in thirty-four digital volumes. A second manga series also by Kashiwara was serialized online via Akita Shoten's Manga Cross website from January 2021 to August 2022. It was collected in two tankōbon volumes. An anime television series adaptation produced by Nippon Animation aired from April to June 2021, and a second season aired from October to December 2021. A spin-off ONA by Planet Studio premiered in April 2024.

== Plot ==
High-school girl Himeno Toyokawa has just moved to Tajimi, Gifu, her late mother's hometown. As Himeno knew little about her mother due to her early death, she was unaware that her mother was once a skilled potter. At her new school, she befriends Mika Kukuri, her classmate and a member of school pottery club. With her new friends and learning about her mother's past, Himeno learns to be a potter herself and enjoy her new hobby.

== Characters ==
Himeno Toyokawa (豊川 姫乃, Toyokawa Himeno)
Voiced by: Minami Tanaka
A first-year high-school student who moved to Tajimi after her father resigned from his previous job. She initially does not know much about pottery, but picks it up after befriending Mika and learning about her mother's past.
Mika Kukuri (久々梨 三華, Kukuri Mika)
Voiced by: Yu Serizawa
A cheerful girl who leads the school pottery club.
Naoko Naruse (成瀬 直子, Naruse Naoko)
Voiced by: Yuki Wakai
A high-school student who often visits the club room despite not being an official member. She appears to be interested in Himeno.
Toko Aoki (青木 十子, Aoki Toko)
Voiced by: Rina Honnizumi
The leader of the pottery club, who aims to follow in the footsteps of her grandfather.
Tokishirō Toyokawa (豊川 刻四郎, Toyokawa Tokishirō)
Voiced by: Kaito Ishikawa
Himeno's father, who moved to his late wife Himena's hometown to start a coffee shop.
Sachie Tokikawa (土岐川 幸恵, Tokikawa Sachie)
Voiced by: Rin Mizuhara
Mami Koizumi (小泉 真美, Koizumi Mami)
Voiced by: Mana Ogawa
Mad Demon (真土泥右衛門, Maddo Deiemon)
Voiced by: Aya Uchida
Yuzuna (ゆずな)
Voiced by: Haru Miyachi
Noa (のあ)
Voiced by: Nendo Tsumura
Tomonari Kusano (草野智也, Kusano Tomonari)
Voiced by: Yūichirō Umehara
Yukari Ōsawa (大沢由香里, Ōsawa Yukari)
Voiced by: Ayaka Suwa
Jūbe Aoki (青木十兵衛, Aoki Jūbe)
Voiced by: Katsumi Suzuki
Rio Matsuse (松瀬理央, Matsuse Rio)
Voiced by: Aya Uchida
Ximena Valdez (ヒメナ・バルデス, Himena Barudesu)
Voiced by: Sally Amaki
Himena Tokikawa (土岐川姫菜, Tokikawa Himena)
Voiced by: Ari Ozawa
Himeno's father and Tokishirō's wife, who died when Himeno was still young. She was a skilled potter.

== Media ==
=== Anime ===
An anime television series adaptation was announced via Twitter on February 14, 2020. The series was animated by Nippon Animation and directed by Jun Kamiya, with Naruhisa Arakawa handling series composition, and Ayano Yoshioka designing the characters. Tajimi and its tourism association collaborated on the anime. The series aired from April 3 to June 21, 2021, on CBC and other channels. Minami Tanaka, Yu Serizawa, Yuki Wakai, and Rina Honnizumi performed the opening theme song "Tobira o Aketara", while Aya Uchida performed the ending theme song "Pale Blue." Crunchyroll streamed the series.

On June 21, 2021, a second season, titled Let's Make a Mug Too: Second Kiln, was announced, with the main staff and cast members returning to reprise their roles. It aired from October 2 to December 18, 2021. The Mug-Mo unit (Minami Tanaka, Yu Serizawa, Yūki Wakai, and Rina Honnizumi) performed the opening theme song "Muchū no Saki e", while Aya Uchida performed the ending theme song "Yellow Canary".

A spin-off ONA centered around the mascot character Rokuro, titled Rokurō no Dai Bōken, was announced on June 5, 2023. The ONA is produced by Planet Studio and directed by Tsutomu Yabuki. It premiered on April 1, 2024, on the DentalE app.

==== Episodes ====
===== Let's Make a Mug Too =====
No. overall	No. in season	Title (Note: All English titles are taken from Crunchyroll.)	Directed by	Written by	Original release date
0	0	"Special Just Before the Broadcast! Yakumo Souvenir Contest"; Transliteration: "Hōsō Chokuzen Supesharu! Yakumo no Omiyage Kontesuto" (Japanese: 放送直前SP！やくものお土産コンテスト)	N/A	N/A	March 26, 2021
1	1	"Welcome to the Pottery Club!"; Transliteration: "Hajimemashite! Tōgei-bu" (Japanese: はじめまして！陶芸部)	Jun Kamiya	Naruhisa Arakawa	April 3, 2021 (Note: This episode was pre-screened on March 19, 2021 on d Anime Store.)
2	2	"The Pottery Club is Paradise"; Transliteration: "Tōgei-bu wa Tōgenkyō" (Japanese: 陶芸部はとーげんきょう)	Kunpei Maeda	Naruhisa Arakawa	April 12, 2021 (Note: Episodes premiered every Monday at 10:30 p.m. JST on Tokyo MX and d Anime Store from this episode.)
3	3	"Because We're Childhood Friends ... Right?"; Transliteration: "Osananajimi da mon ... ne" (Japanese: おさななじみだもん…ね)	Hirokazu Yamada	Naruhisa Arakawa	April 19, 2021
4	4	"The Taste of Ochazuke"; Transliteration: "Ochazuke no Aji" (Japanese: お茶漬けの味)	Kazuomi Koga	Naruhisa Arakawa	April 26, 2021
5	5	"The Teacher's Secret"; Transliteration: "Sensei no Himitsu☆" (Japanese: 先生のひみつ☆)	Kunpei Maeda	Naruhisa Arakawa	May 3, 2021
6	6	"The Garden of Sky and Wind"; Transliteration: "Sora to Kaze no Niwa" (Japanese: 空と風の庭)	Masayoshi Ozaki	Naruhisa Arakawa	May 10, 2021
7	7	"Himeno's Piece"; Transliteration: "Himeno no Tsukurumono" (Japanese: 姫乃のつくるもの)	Hirokazu Yamada	Naruhisa Arakawa	May 17, 2021
8	8	"Kukuri of the Strange River"; Transliteration: "Fushigi no Kawa no Kukuri" (Japanese: ふしぎの川のククリ)	Kunpei Maeda	Naruhisa Arakawa	May 24, 2021
9	9	"Pound, Stretch, Subtract, and Add"; Transliteration: "Tataite Nobashite Hiitetasu" (Japanese: たたいてのばしてひいてたす)	Yūko Kiyoshima	Naruhisa Arakawa	May 31, 2021
10	10	"Hime-chan Is Doing Her Best"; Transliteration: "Hime-chan Ganbattemasu♡" (Japanese: 姫ちゃんがんばってます♡)	Kunpei Maeda	Naruhisa Arakawa	June 7, 2021
11	11	"I Want to Win a Prize Now"; Transliteration: "Shō ga Hoshiku Natchatta" (Japanese: 賞がほしくなっちゃった)	Natsumi Uchinuma	Naruhisa Arakawa	June 14, 2021
12	12	"A Smile for the Future"; Transliteration: "Ashita e no Egao" (Japanese: 明日への笑顔)	Kunpei Maeda	Naruhisa Arakawa	June 21, 2021

===== Let's Make a Mug Too: Second Kiln =====
No. overall	No. in season	Title	Directed by	Written by	Original release date
13	1	"Let's Go! Down the Path of Pottery"; Transliteration: "Aruki Dasō! Yakimono no machi e" (Japanese: 歩き出そう！焼き物の町へ)	Kunpei Maeda	Naruhisa Arakawa	October 2, 2021 (Note: This episode was pre-screened on September 25, 2021 on d Anime Store.)
14	2	"My Paradise"; Transliteration: "Watashi no Paradaisu" (Japanese: 私のパラダイス)	Kunpei Maeda	Naruhisa Arakawa	October 9, 2021
15	3	"My Mom Really Is Amazing!"; Transliteration: "Okāsan Yappa Sugoi!" (Japanese: お母さんやっぱ凄い！)	Masayuki Iimura	Naruhisa Arakawa	October 16, 2021 (Note: This episode aired at 2:10 a.m. JST, 15 minutes after the original air time on CBC.)
16	4	"The Mumblings of the Clay"; Transliteration: "Tsuchi no Hitorigoto" (Japanese: 土のひとりごと)	Kunpei Maeda	Naruhisa Arakawa	October 23, 2021
17	5	"What's Wrong, Touko-senpai?"; Transliteration: "Dō Shita no? Tōko-senpai" (Japanese: どうしたの？十子先輩)	Kunpei Maeda	Naruhisa Arakawa	October 30, 2021
18	6	"The Pottery Club of Endless Mysteries"; Transliteration: "Nazo ga Nazo Yobu Tōgei-bu" (Japanese: 謎が謎呼ぶ陶芸部)	Masayuki Iimura	Naruhisa Arakawa	November 6, 2021
19	7	"Supersized ♥ Cultural Festival"; Transliteration: "Tenkomori ♡ Bunkasai" (Japanese: てんこもり♡文化祭)	Kunpei Maeda	Naruhisa Arakawa	November 13, 2021
20	8	"Good Day for the Pottery Wheel"; Transliteration: "Rokuro-biyori" (Japanese: ろくろびより)	Masayuki Iimura	Naruhisa Arakawa	November 20, 2021
21	9	"Beyond the Calm Autumn Sky"; Transliteration: "Sunda Akizora no Mukō ni" (Japanese: 澄んだ秋空の向こうに)	Kunpei Maeda	Naruhisa Arakawa	November 27, 2021
22	10	"Found It!"; Transliteration: "Mitsuketa yo!" (Japanese: 見つけたよ！)	Masayuki Iimura	Naruhisa Arakawa	December 4, 2021
23	11	"Freedom - Future - Sparkle"; Transliteration: "Jiyū Mirai Kirameki" (Japanese: 自由・未来・きらめき)	Kunpei Maeda	Naruhisa Arakawa	December 11, 2021
24	12	"I'm Making a Mug!"; Transliteration: "Yaku no wa Magu Kappu Desu!" (Japanese: やくのはマグカップです！)	Kunpei Maeda	Naruhisa Arakawa	December 18, 2021
