= PriPara =

Japanese arcade video game

- Cover of the manga's first tankobon volume

プリパラ (PuriPara)
- Genre: Comedy
- Video game
- Developer: Syn Sophia
- Publisher: Takara Tomy Arts
- Genre: Rhythm, Dress-up
- Platform: Arcade
- Released: July 10, 2014
- Manga
- Written by: Hitsuji Tsujinaga
- Published by: Shogakukan
- Magazine: Ciao
- Original run: July 2014 – present
- Anime television series
- Directed by: Makoto Moriwaki
- Written by: Michihiro Tsuchiya
- Music by: Tsuneyoshi Saito
- Studio: Tatsunoko Production; DongWoo A&E
- Licensed by: SA/SEA: Medialink
- Original network: TXN (TV Tokyo), BS Japan, AT-X
- Original run: July 5, 2014 – March 28, 2017
- Episodes: 140
- Anime film

PriPara: Everyone, Assemble! Prism☆Tours
- Directed by: Masakazu Hishida
- Written by: Jo Aoba
- Studio: Tatsunoko Production
- Licensed by: SA/SEA: Medialink
- Released: March 7, 2015
- Runtime: 90 minutes
- Anime film

Fly Out, PriPara: Aim for it with Everyone! Idol☆Grand Prix
- Directed by: Nobutaka Yoda
- Written by: Deko Akao
- Studio: Tatsunoko Production
- Licensed by: SA/SEA: Medialink
- Released: October 24, 2015
- Runtime: 90 minutes
- Anime film

PriPara Minna no Akogare Let's Go PriPari
- Directed by: Makoto Moriwaki
- Written by: Kazuyuki Fudeyasu
- Studio: Tatsunoko Production
- Licensed by: SA/SEA: Medialink
- Released: March 12, 2016
- Runtime: 60 minutes
- Anime film

PriPara: Everyone Shine! Sparkling Star Live
- Directed by: Makoto Moriwaki; Masao Okubo
- Written by: Kazuyuki Fudeyasu
- Studio: Tatsunoko Production
- Licensed by: SA/SEA: Medialink
- Released: March 4, 2017
- Runtime: 57 minutes
- Video game

PriPara: All Idol Perfect Stage!
- Developer: Syn Sophia
- Publisher: Capcom: JP: Takara Tomy Arts
- Genre: rhythm, dress-up
- Platform: Switch
- Released: March 22, 2018
- Anime film

PriPara & Kiratto Pri☆Chan Movie: Sparkling Memorial Live
- Directed by: Nobutaka Yoda
- Written by: Hiroko Fukuda
- Studio: Tatsunoko Production
- Licensed by: SA/SEA: Medialink
- Released: May 5, 2018
- Runtime: 85 minutes
- Original net animation

Idol Land PriPara
- Directed by: Makoto Moriwaki
- Written by: Michihiro Tsuchiya
- Music by: Avex Pictures
- Studio: Tatsunoko Production
- Released: August 18, 2021 – April 24, 2024
- Episodes: 12
- Video game

Idol Land PriPara
- Developer: Syn Sophia; Arc System Works
- Publisher: JP: Takara Tomy Arts; WW: Koei Tecmo
- Genre: Rhythm, Dress-up
- Platform: Android, iOS
- Released: August 17, 2023
- Anime film

Aikatsu! x PriPara The Movie: A Miracle Encounter!
- Directed by: Takahiro Okawa
- Written by: Michihiro Tsuchiya
- Music by: Avex Pictures
- Studio: BN Pictures/Syn Sophia/Takara Tomy Arts
- Licensed by: SA/SEA: Medialink
- Released: October 10, 2025
- Runtime: 75 minutes
- Other series
- Pretty Rhythm: Aurora Dream (2011); Pretty Rhythm: Dear My Future (2012); Pretty Rhythm: Rainbow Live (2013); PriPara (2014); Idol Time PriPara (2017); Kiratto Pri☆Chan (2018); Waccha PriMagi! (2021); Himitsu no AiPri (2024); Onegai AiPri (2026)

PriPara (プリパラ, PuriPara; short for Prism Paradise) is a Japanese dress-up arcade video game by Takara Tomy and the successor of the Pretty Rhythm series of arcade video games, as well as the second entry in the Pretty Series. An anime television series adaptation by Tatsunoko Production and DongWoo A&E, comprising three seasons, aired from July 5, 2014, to March 28, 2017. A second animation adaption, Idol Time PriPara, premiered on April 4, 2017. A mobile game, Idol Land PriPara, was released on August 17, 2023, along with a web series. There were also four animated films produced.

== Plot ==
Every girl finds a mysterious PriTicket which grants them entrance to the world of PriPara, where aspiring idols perform to pass an audition. At the Paprika Private Academy, PriPara activity is prohibited for elementary school students.

=== Season 1 ===
Fifth grade student Laala Manaka finds a lost PriTicket bag belonging to an idol, Mirei Minami, leading her to PriPara, a virtual world where people transform into their idol alter ego. Laala forms SoLaMi♡Smile, a trio with Mirei and Sophy Hojo, managed by Kuma, a bear-like character who was formerly Mirei's manager. They are joined by Sion Todo, who forms Dressing Pafé with Canadian-Japanese twins Dorothy and Reona West, managed by Sophy's manager, Usagi. Both units had the goal of earning the Paradise Coord.

Halfway through the season, Laala encounters Falulu, a robotic vocal doll born from the desire of many girls to go to PriPara. SoLaMi♡Dressing, composed of both SoLaMi♡Smile and Dressing Pafé's members, competes against Falulu for the Paradise Coord in several idol competitions. The group wins and Laala exchanges PriTickets with Falulu, who falls into a coma. After performing a concert in their Paradise Coords, SoLaMi♡Dressing revives Falulu, who becomes more emotional, expressive, and human-like. When Falulu goes to PriParis in France, SoLaMi♡Dressing disbands back into SoLaMi♡Smile and Dressing Pafé.

=== Season 2 ===
With the grand opening of the Dream Theater, the six idols reform SoLaMi♡Smile and Dressing Pafé. They encounter Aromageddon, an angel-devil themed duo consisting of Mikan Shiratama and Aroma Kurosu. At the same time, the idols are joined by Fuwari Midorikaze from The Palps in EuroPara and Hibiki Shikyōin. Fuwari and Laala aim to win the Summer Dream Idol Grand Prix, only for their Summer Dream Idol Coords to be stolen by Hibiki. Ajimi Kiki, later revealed to be the art teacher of Paprika Academy, forms a dream team alongside Cosmo with the PriPara Police (Laala, Dorothy, and Mikan). Ajimi and Cosmo win the Autumn Dream Idol Grand Prix, but their Autumn Dream Idol Coords are taken by the Masked Genius (Hibiki in disguise).

During the Winter Dream Idol Grand Prix, a spoiled, mischievous vocal doll, Gaaruru, joins Aromageddon, which is renamed Gaarmageddon. The FriendAll team (Laala, Dorothy, Mirei, Mikan, and Aroma) win the Spring Dream Idol Grand Prix and restore PriPara.

=== Season 3 ===
During the announcement of the Divine Idol Grand Prix, Meganii realizes that the special judge, Jewlie, has gone missing. After giving a tour to newcomer Chili Tsukigawa, Laala finds a mysterious baby named Jewlulu who thinks Laala is her mother. Laala raises Jewlulu with the help of her younger sister, Non. At the same time, Laala encounters TRiANGLE – a trio consisting of Junon, Pinon, and Kanon – managed by Usagi's sister, Usacha. Laala shows Jewlulu to her friends, and Meganii reveals that the baby is Jewlie.

As the tournament begins, Gaarmageddon loses to Dressing Pafé in the first round, while UCCHARI BIG-BANGS loses to Tricolore. SoLaMi♡SMILE defeats both NonSugar and Tricolore and manages to almost win against Dressing Pafé. However, the disappearance of Jewlie and Janis causes the Divine Idol Grand Prix Stage to fail. SoLaMi♡SMILE tries to fix everything, only to fail until all of their friends start singing along, giving them the power to save the world.

== Characters ==
=== SoLaMi♡SMILE ===
Laala Manaka (真中らぁら, Manaka Laala)
Voiced by: Himika Akaneya

Mirei Minami (南みれぃ, Minami Mirei)
Voiced by: Yū Serizawa

Sophy Hōjō (北条そふぃ, Hōjō Sofi)
Voiced by: Miyu Kubota

=== Dressing Pafé ===
Sion Tōdō (東堂シオン, Tōdō Shion)
Voiced by: Saki Yamakita
Dorothy West (ドロシー・ウェスト, Doroshi U~esuto)
Voiced by: Azuki Shibuya
Reona West (レオナ・ウェスト, Reona U~esuto)
Voiced by: Yuki Wakai

=== Gaarmageddon ===
Aroma Kurosu (黒須あろま, Kurosu Aroma)
Voiced by: Mai Kanno
Mikan Shiratama (白玉みかん, Shiratama Mikan)
Voiced by: Yui Watanabe
Gaaruru (ガァルル, Gāruru)
Voiced by: Asami Sanada

=== Tricolore ===
Hibiki Shikyōin (紫京院ひびき, Shikyōin Hibiki)
Voiced by: Mitsuki Saiga
Falulu (ファルル, Faruru)
Voiced by: Chinatsu Akasaki
Fuwari Midorikaze (緑風 ふわり, Midorikaze Fuwari)
Voiced by: Azusa Sato

=== NonSugar ===
Non Manaka (真中のん, Manaka Non)
Voiced by: Minami Tanaka
Chiri Tsukikawa (月川 ちり, Tsukikawa Chiri)
Voiced by: Nichika Ōmori
Pepper Taiyō (太陽ペッパー, Taiyō Peppā)
Voiced by: Nanami Yamashita

=== Mascots ===
Kuma (クマ)
Voiced by: Chihiro Suzuki
Usagi (ウサギ)
Voiced by: Takuma Terashima
Unicorn (ユニコン)
Voiced by: Ikue Ōtani
Neko (ねこ)
Voiced by: Hiromi Konno
Usacha (ウサチャ)
Voiced by: Sumire Morohoshi
Toriko (トリコ)
Voiced by: Rikako Aikawa
Ham (ハム)
Voiced by: Makoto Furukawa

=== Others ===
Meganee Akai (赤井めが姉ぇ, Akai Maganee)
Voiced by: Kanae Itō
Meganii Akai (赤井めが兄ぃ, Akai Maganii)
Voiced by: Junichi Suwabe
Cosmo Hōjō (北条コスモ, Hōjō Kosumo)
Voiced by: Nozomi Yamamoto
Chanko Nabeshima (鍋島ちゃん子, Nabeshima Chanko)
Voiced by: Chinatsu Akasaki
Ajimi Kiki (黄木 あじみ, Kiki Ajimi)
Voiced by: Reina Ueda
Mini-Falulu (ミニファルル, Mini Faruru)
Voiced by: Rina Kawaei
Rei Ando (安藤玲, Andō Rei)
Voiced by: Takuma Terashima
Kanon (かのん) / Junon (じゅのん) / Pinon (ぴのん)
Voiced by: Minami Tanaka
Jewlulu (ジュルル, Jururu) / Jewlie (ジュリィ, Juri)
Voiced by: Reina Ueda
Janis (ジャニス, Janisu)
Voiced by: Aki Toyosaki
Amari Katasumi (香田澄 あまり, Katsumi Amari)
Voiced by: Riho Iida
Mario (マリオ, Mario)
Voiced by: Tatsumaru Tachibana
Ushimitsu (ウシミツ, Ushimitsu) and Shinya Oedo (大江戸シンヤ, Ōedo Shinya)
Voiced by: Shotaro Uzawa (Ushimitsu), Kentaro Kawai (Shinya)
Pololo (ポォロロ, Poororo)
Voiced by: Coco Hayashi
Laalulu (らぁるる, Raaruru)
Voiced by: Himika Akaneya

=== Paprika Private Academy ===
Gloria Ookanda (大神田グロリア, Ookanda Guroria)
Voiced by: Urara Takano

== Media ==
PriPara is a rhythm game which was developed by Syn Sophia. A player can create a character and progress by performing live shows.

A manga adaptation by Hitsuji Tsujinaga began serialization in Shogakukan's shōjo manga magazine Ciao in July 2014.

=== Anime & Films ===
An anime television-series adaptation by Tatsunoko and DongWoo A&E aired on TV Tokyo and other TXN stations from July 5, 2014, to March 28, 2017. It was succeeded by Idol Time Pripara on April 4, 2017. In the second quarter of 2015, the series could also be seen on three JAITS stations in Nara (TVN), Shiga (BBC) and Wakayama (WTV). During the first season's second story arc, the series began airing on FNN affiliate Sendai Television. On July 5, 2015, PriPara began airing on ANN affiliate SATV. In 2015, the animation for one of the endings was changed after the Broadcasting Ethics and Program Improvement Organization lodged a complaint for depicting the characters in swimsuits. While the images of the characters in swimsuits were not changed, the ending was edited to remove an image of Sophy Hojo wearing black lingerie, which appeared to be an homage to Marilyn Monroe.

An English-dubbed pilot of the series was produced by William Winckler Productions in 2017.

PriPara: Everyone, Assemble! Prism Tours, was released on March 7, 2015. A second film, titled Fly Out, PriPara: Aim for it with Everyone! Idol☆Grand Prix was released the same year on October 24, 2015. A third film, PriPara: Everyone's Longing! Let's Go PriParis!, was released on March 12, 2016., A fourth film, PriPara: Everyone Shine! Sparkling Star Live was released on March 4, 2017.

=== PriPara: All Idol Perfect Stage! ===
PriPara: All Idol Perfect Stage! (プリパラ オールアイドルパーフェクトステージ！, PuriPara: Ōru Aidoru Pāfekuto Sutēji!) is a rhythm game developed by Syn Sophia and published by Capcom for the Nintendo Switch, released on March 22, 2018. Players create a custom character to dance to songs from the PriPara anime, as well as to songs exclusive to the game. Gameplay consists of timing button presses to on-screen prompts. The game also includes a harder difficulty called Gold Mode to add additional green and blue prompts that utilize different buttons. By performing well in the rhythm sections of the game, currency is gained that players can spend to customize their avatar with additional accessories and outfits. the game introduces Mirai Momoyama the main character from Kiratto Pri☆Chan.

=== Idol Land PriPara ===
A mobile game titled Idol Land PriPara was released on December 6, 2020. In the game, players create and customize characters who can become idols. An anime adaptation based on it was released as well. Produced by Tatsunoko, the anime was directed by Makoto Moriwaki, Michihiro Tsuchiya supervised the scripts, and Avex Pictures produced the music. Originally set to be released in Q2 2021, the game was delayed five times to August 17, 2023. However, soon after launch the game underwent a maintenance until August 23, as its servers were overwhelmed by the number of users. The anime and game were postponed, during which time four episodes were previewed.
