= Yū Serizawa =

Japanese voice actress

- 芹澤 優
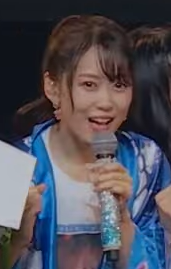
- Yū Serizawa in 2024
- Born: December 3, 1994 (age 31); Tokyo, Japan
- Occupations: Voice actress; singer
- Years active: 2012–present
- Agent: 81 Produce
- Notable work: PriPara as Mirei Minami; Kiratto Pri Chan as Anna Akagi; My Monster Secret as Youko Shiragami; Real Girl as Iroha Igarashi; How Clumsy you are, Miss Ueno as Ueno; Shomin Sample as Aika Tenkūbashi; How Not to Summon a Demon Lord as Shera L. Greenwood; Twin Star Exorcists as Mayura Otomi; Rent-A-Girlfriend as Mini Yaemori
- Height: 163 cm (5 ft 4 in)
- Relatives: Yuki Saito (aunt); Ryūji Saitō (uncle)
- Musical career
- Genres: J-Pop; Anison
- Instrument: Vocals
- Years active: 2012–present
- Label: Avex
- Member of: Iris
- Website: yu-serizawa.com

Yū Serizawa (芹澤 優, Serizawa Yū; born December 3, 1994) is a Japanese voice actress and singer associated with 81 Produce. She is a member of the idol voice actor group Iris. In 2019, she won the Best Supporting Actress Award with Nao Tōyama in the 13th Seiyu Awards.

Serizawa is the niece of singer Yuki Saito.

== Discography ==
=== Extended plays ===
Year	Title	Album details	Peak chart positions		Sales
Year	Title	Album details	JPN	JPN Hot	Sales
2017	You & You	Released: April 26, 2017; Label: Dive II Entertainment; Formats: CD, digital download	46	—	—
2017	Only You? Only Me!	Released: November 29, 2017; Label: Dive II Entertainment; Formats: CD, digital download	37	—	—
"—" denotes releases that did not chart or were not released in that region.

=== Studio albums ===
Year	Title	Album details	Peak chart positions		Sales
Year	Title	Album details	JPN	JPN Hot	Sales
2022	YOUr No.1	Released: October 5, 2022; Label: Dive II Entertainment; Formats: CD, digital download	18	—	—

=== Singles ===
Year	Title	Peak chart positions			Sales	Album
Year	Title	JPN Oricon	JPN Hot	JPN Ani	Sales	Album
2018	"Saiaku na Hi Demo Anata ga Suki" (最悪な日でもあなたが好き。) (lit. Even on the Worst Days, I Love You)	17	56	17	—	Non-album single
2019	"Devikyū" (デビきゅー)	20	—	—	—	Non-album single
2021	EVERYBODY! EVERYBODY! / YOU YOU YOU (with DJ KOO & MOTSU)	29	—	—	—	YOUr No.1
2023	JUNGLE FIRE feat. MOTSU	17	—	—	—	
"—" denotes releases that did not chart or were not released in that region.

== Filmography ==
=== Anime ===
Year	Title	Role	Notes
2013	Dog & Scissors	Maxi Akizuki	
2013	Freezing Vibration	Female student A	
2013	Gon	Baby Pusuke, Rabbit 2, Pepe	
2013	Mushibugyō	Tenma Ichinotani	
2013	Pretty Rhythm: Rainbow Live	Ann Fukuhara	
2014	Battle Spirits: Saikyou Ginga Ultimate Zero	Fairy	
2014	Parasyte: The Maxym	Housewife (ep. 8), Makiko	
2014–2017	PriPara	Mirei Minami	
2014	When Supernatural Battles Became Commonplace	Aki Natsu	
2014	Wizard Barristers	Nyanyai	
2015	My Monster Secret	Yōko Shiragami	
2015	Noragami Aragoto	Ayaha	
2015	Shomin Sample	Aika Tenkūbashi	
2016	Twin Star Exorcists	Mayura Otomi	
2016	Love Live! Sunshine!!	Mutsu	
2017–2018	Idol Time PriPara	Mirei Minami, Chuppe	
2017	Kado: The Right Answer	Yukika Shindō	
2017	Kakegurui - Compulsive Gambler	Yumemi Yumemite	
2018	How Not to Summon a Demon Lord	Shera L. Greenwood	
2018–2021	Kiratto Pri Chan	Anna Akagi	
2018	Magical Girl Site	Nijimi Anazawa	
2018	Mr. Tonegawa: Middle Management Blues	Zawa Voice (003)	
2018	Million Arthur	Brigitte	
2018	Real Girl	Iroha Igarashi	
2019	How Clumsy you are, Miss Ueno	Ueno	
2019	Kakegurui XX	Yumemi Yumemite	
2019	Million Arthur 2nd Season	Brigitte	
2019	Real Girl 2nd Season	Iroha Igarashi	
2020	Show by Rock!! Mashumairesh!!	Sumomone	
2020	Seton Academy: Join the Pack!	Mei Mei	
2020	Black Clover	Lolopechka	
2020	Fly Me to the Moon	Kaname Arisugawa	
2021	Show by Rock!! Stars!!	Sumomone	
2021	Let's Make a Mug Too	Mika Kukuri	
2021	How Not to Summon a Demon Lord Ω	Shera L. Greenwood	
2021	Banished from the Hero's Party	Tanta	
2021	Build Divide -#00000 (Code Black)-	Kikka	
2021–2024	Idol Land Pripara	Mirei Minami	
2021	180-Byō de Kimi no Mimi o Shiawase ni Dekiru ka?	Nanako	
2022	Life with an Ordinary Guy Who Reincarnated into a Total Fantasy Knockout	Muria	
2022	Princess Connect! Re:Dive Season 2	Ayane	
2022	Build Divide -#00000 (Code White)-	Kikka	
2022	Shine Post	Ren Kurogane	
2022	The Little Lies We All Tell	Tsubasa	
2023	Giant Beasts of Ars	Myaa	
2023	Handyman Saitou in Another World	Lychee	
2023	In Another World with My Smartphone 2nd Season	Hildegard Minas Lestia	
2023	Fly Me to the Moon 2nd Season	Kaname Arisugawa	
2023	Magical Destroyers	Slayer	
2023	Rent-A-Girlfriend 3rd Season	Mini Yaemori	
2023	TenPuru	Tsukuyo Aoba	
2023	Reborn as a Vending Machine, I Now Wander the Dungeon	Pel	
2023	I'm in Love with the Villainess	Rae Taylor	
2023	MF Ghost	Nozomi Kitahara	
2023	Waccha Primagi	Himeme	Game only
2024	My Wife Has No Emotion	Super Mina	
2024	The Café Terrace and Its Goddesses 2nd Season	Valentina Azuma	
2024	Narenare: Cheer for You!	Miyabi Kushida	
2024	Egumi Legacy	Golden Retriever	
2024	The Most Notorious "Talker" Runs the World's Greatest Clan	Alma Judikhali	
2024	Let This Grieving Soul Retire!	Kris Argent	
2025	Even Given the Worthless "Appraiser" Class, I'm Actually the Strongest	Pina	
2025	I May Be a Guild Receptionist, But I'll Solo Any Boss to Clock Out on Time	Laila	
2025	Magic Maker: How to Make Magic in Another World	Raphina	
2025	Medaka Kuroiwa Is Impervious to My Charms	Mona Kawai	
2025	Maebashi Witches	Eiko Zen	
2025	A Ninja and an Assassin Under One Roof	Marin Izutsumi	
2025	Night of the Living Cat	Tsutsumi	
2025	Hands Off: Sawaranaide Kotesashi-kun	Aoba Kitahara	
2026	You Can't Be in a Rom-Com with Your Childhood Friends!	Akari Hiodoshi	
2026	Always a Catch!	Maria Annovazzi	
2026	Gals Can't Be Kind to Otaku!?	Kotoko Ijichi	
2026	Kirio Fan Club	Yua	
2026	The Cat and the Dragon	Haneko	
2026	My Stepmother and Stepsisters Aren't Wicked	Marika Kōnokura	
2026–present	Pokémon Horizons: The Series	Navi	
2027	Giant Ojō-sama	Oriko Fujido	

=== Film animation ===
- Pretty Rhythm All Star Selection: Prism Show Best Ten (2014), Ann Fukuhara
- PriPara the Movie: Eeeeveryone, Assemble! Prism Tours (2015), Mirei Minami
- PriPara Mi~nna no Akogare Let's Go PriPari (2016), Mirei Minami
- King of Prism: Pride the Hero (2016), Ann Fukuhara
- PriPara: Everyone Shine! Sparkling☆Star Live (2017), Mirei Minami
- King of Prism: Shiny Seven Stars (2019), Ann Fukuhara
- Iris the Movie: Full Energy!! (2024), Herself
- Aikatsu! x PriPara: The Movie – Miraculous Meeting (2025), Mirei Minami

=== Original video animation ===
- Mushibugyō (2014), Tenma Ichinotani
- Nozo × Kimi (2014), Mirei Watanuki

=== Original net animation ===
- Lost Song (2018), Monica Lux
- Chi's Sweet Summer Vacation (2024), Aina
- Tokyo Override (2024), Ayumi
- Yu-Gi-Oh! Card Game The Chronicles (2025), Kitt

=== Video games ===
- Idol Death Game TV (2016), Ayaka Tennouji
- Granblue Fantasy (2017), Vajra
- Girls' Frontline (2017), PP-19, FMG-9
- Princess Connect! Re:Dive (2018), Ayane Hojo
- Honkai Impact 3rd (2019), Liliya Olenyeva
- Dragalia Lost (2019), Xiao Lei
- Grand Summoners (2019), Amane
- Root Film (2020), Aine Magari
- ALTDEUS: Beyond Chronos (2020), Julie
- Blue Reflection: Second Light (2021), Yuki Kinjou
- Azur Lane (2021), IJN Chikuma
- Eve: Ghost Enemies (2022), Naho Hodaka
- Action Taimanin (2022), Shizuru Kousaka
- Heaven Burns Red (2022), Karen Asakura
- Punishing: Gray Raven (2022), Lilith
- Arknights (2023), Almond
- Idol Land Pripara (2023), Mirei Minami
- Zenless Zone Zero (2024), Nicole Demara
- Umamusume: Pretty Derby (2024), Gentildonna
- Goddess of Victory: Nikke (2024), Bay
- Beyblade X: EvoBattle (2025), Line Shindo
- Nekopara: Sekai Connect (2026), Sorbet

=== Dubbing ===
==== Live-action ====
- The Best of Me, young Amanda (Liana Liberato)
- Houdini, Erich Weiss (Louis Mertens)
- The Hunter's Prayer, Ella Hatto (Odeya Rush)

==== Animation ====
- A Turtle's Tale 2: Sammy's Escape from Paradise, Ricky
