= Himika Akaneya =

Japanese voice actress (born 1994)

- 茜屋 日海夏
- Born: July 16, 1994 (age 32); Akita Prefecture, Japan
- Occupations: Voice actress; singer
- Years active: 2012–present
- Agent: 81 Produce
- Height: 161 cm (5 ft 3 in)
- Musical career
- Genres: J-pop; anime song
- Instrument: Vocals
- Years active: 2012–present
- Label: Avex
- Member of: Iris

Himika Akaneya (茜屋 日海夏, Akaneya Himika; born July 16, 1994) is a Japanese voice actress and singer who is a member of the idol group Iris. She is affiliated with 81 Produce.

On July 5, 2023, she made her solo debut under her English name with her debut single "Stereo Sunset", releasing on November 22, 2023. The song was used at the ending theme song for the anime, MF Ghost.

== Biography ==
Akaneya is a quarter Korean through her father's side. Her Korean name is Jo Hae-eun (Korean: 조해은). With an interest of music, Akaneya dreamed of entering the entertainment world when she was three years old. She passed an audition at the age of seventeen. Akaneya is a vegetarian.

== Filmography ==
=== Television animation ===
- Freezing Vibration (2013), Female Student B
- Pretty Rhythm: Rainbow Live (2013), Customer 3
- Noragami (2014), Nayu; Student A
- Pretty Rhythm: All Star Selection (2014), Laala Manaka
- PriPara (2014–17), Laala Manaka
- SoniAni: Super Sonico the Animation (2014), Santa girl B
- Dance with Devils (2015), Ritsuka Tachibana
- Himouto! Umaru-chan (2015), Woman, Saleslady, Female Student, Female Announcer
- Junjo Romantica 3 (2015), Girls
- ReLIFE (2016), Honoka Tamarai
- Izetta: The Last Witch (2016), Izetta
- Idol Time PriPara (2017–18), Laala Manaka
- In Another World With My Smartphone (2017), Lapis
- Land of the Lustrous (2017), Zircon
- How to Keep a Mummy (2018), Asa Motegi
- Magical Girl Site (2018), Tsuyuno Yatsumura
- RErideD: Derrida, who leaps through time (2018), Yuri Dietrich
- Rascal Does Not Dream of Bunny Girl Senpai (2018), Saki Kamisato
- Million Arthur (2018–19), Nuckelavee
- Mini Toji (2019), Mihono Asakura
- Kiratto Pri Chan (2019–21), Maria Kanamori, Laala
- King of Prism: Shiny Seven Stars (2019), as God IV
- Magical Sempai (2019), Sister
- Shachibato! President, It's Time for Battle! (2020), Subaru
- Black Clover (2020), Dazuu Tayak

=== Film animation ===
- Pretty Rhythm All-Star Selection the Movie: Prism Show Best Ten (2014), Laala Manaka (Cameo)
- Love Live! School Idol Movie (2015), Star Idol
- PriPara Mi~nna Atsumare! Prism Tours (2015), Laala Manaka
- Tobidasu PriPara Mi~nna de Mezase! Idol Grand Prix (2015), Laala Manaka
- PriPara Mi~nna no Akogare Let's Go PriPari (2016), Laala Manaka
- Kacchikenee! (2016), Aiko
- PriPara Minna de Kagayake! Kirarin☆Star Live! (2017), Laala Manaka
- Dance with Devils: Fortuna (2017), Ritsuka Tachibana
- PriPara & Kiratto Pri Chan Movie: Sparkling Memorial Live (2018), Laala Manaka
- Iris the Movie: Full Energy!! (2024), Herself
- Aikatsu! x PriPara: The Movie – Miraculous Meeting (2025), Laala Manaka

=== Video games ===
- Fate/Grand Order (2017), Caster of Oceanus/Circe
- Xenoblade Chronicles 2 (2017), Raiko/Electra
- Katana Maidens ~ Toji No Miko (2018), Mihono Asakura
- Onsen Musume: Yunohana Collection (2018), Hana Ikaho
- The Caligula Effect: Overdose (2018), Kuchinashi
- Grand Summoners (2019), Tamae
- Root Film (2020), Riho
- Action Taimanin (2021), Momochi Nagi
- Panilla Saga (2022), Yuugao

=== Film ===
- Omaera Zenin Mendokusai! (2019), Eiko Enomoto
