= Miyu Kubota =

Japanese voice actress (born 1995)

- 久保田未夢
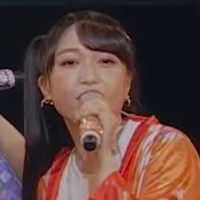
- Kubota in 2024
- Born: January 31, 1995 (age 31); Saitama Prefecture, Japan
- Other name: Miyutan
- Occupations: Voice actress; Singer; Idol
- Years active: 2012–present
- Agents: 81 Produce; Avex Pictures
- Height: 157 cm (5 ft 2 in)

Miyu Kubota (久保田 未夢, Kubota Miyu; born January 31, 1995) is a Japanese voice actress, singer and idol from Saitama Prefecture. She is a member of i☆Ris. Kubota is affiliated with 81 Produce and Avex Pictures.

== Career ==
Kubota attended a technical high school, and while there obtained a license to operate a forklift and to arc weld. As a senior in high school Kubota passed the Anisong vocal audition. In 2012 she and five other singers who had passed the audition formed the idol group i☆Ris and debuted in the same year. Her image color was orange. After graduating from high school she went on to university and continued her work as a voice actress and singer.

In 2013, she began voice acting in the anime Nyaruko: Crawling with Love. Her first major role was in 2014 as Sophy Hōjō in PriPara.

I☆Ris won the 10th annual Seiyu Award for singing in 2016.

In September 2017, Kubota was cast as Karin Asaka in the smartphone game Love Live School Idol Festival All Stars.

== Filmography ==
=== Anime ===
2013

- Nyaruko: Crawling with Love as store clerk
- Pretty Rhythm: Rainbow Live as Customer 5

2014

- Battle Spirits: Saikyou Ginga Ultimate Zero as Samantha
- Dragon Collection as Tort
- Hamatora as Girl
- Pripara as Sophy Hōjō
- Robocar Poli as Betty

2015

- Urawa no Usagi-chan as Kojika Betsujo

2017

- Idol Time Pripara as Sophy Hōjō, Hana, and Powan
- Makeruna!! Aku no Guntan as Narrator for episode 2
- Kabukibu! as Tōko
- Black Clover as Sister Lily

2018

- Kiratto Pri Chan as Emo Moegi
- Magical Girl Site as Maimu Akane
- Gurazeni as Uguisu-jō
- Dropkick on my Devil! as Medusa

2019

- Grimms Notes The Animation as Shane, Alice
- Wise Man's Grandchild as Alice Corner
- King of Prism: Shiny Seven Stars as God VII

2020

- Plunderer as Saki Ichinose
- Love Live! Nijigasaki High School Idol Club as Karin Asaka

2022

- Love Live! Nijigasaki High School Idol Club 2nd Season as Karin Asaka
- Musasino! as Kojika Bessho
- Shine Post as Itoha Karabayashi
- Aru Asa Dummy Head Mike ni Natteita Ore-kun no Jinsei as Toto Asakusa

2023

- In Another World with My Smartphone 2nd Season as Sakura

2024

- Plus-Sized Elf as Kusahanada
- Let This Grieving Soul Retire! as Tino Shade

=== OVA ===
- Fantasy Star Stellara (2014) as Ayumi Kido

=== Film animation ===
- PriPara 4 Movies (2015 to 2017) as Sophy Hōjō
- King of Prism -Pride the Hero- (2017) as audience
- Pripara & Kiratto Pri Chan Kirakira Memorial live (2018) as Emo Moegi
- Iris the Movie: Full Energy!! (2024), Herself
- Love Live! Nijigasaki High School Idol Club Final Chapter (2024–2025) as Karin Asaka
- Aikatsu! x PriPara: The Movie – Miraculous Meeting (2025) as Sophy Hōjō

=== Video games ===
==== 2013 ====
- Metal Max 4: Gekkō no Diva as Mikan

==== 2014 ====
- OreTawā -Over Legend Endless Tower- as Scoop, Spana, and Asphalt cutter

==== 2015 ====
- Uchi no Hime-sama wa Ichiban Kawaii as Harumachi-hime
- MaidenCraft as Inori Tokitō
- Tokyo Harem as Erika Chihaya

==== 2016 ====
- Grimms Notes as Shane

==== 2017 ====
- SOUL REVERSE ZERO as Waltraute and Roßweiße
- Raramaji Honyarara MAGIC as Mai Suzaki

==== 2018 ====
- Monster Musume Harem as Medusa

==== 2019 ====
- Love Live! School Idol Festival as Karin Asaka
- Love Live School Idol Festival All Stars as Karin Asaka
- Grand Summoners as Shiki

==== 2020 ====
- Digimon ReArise as Sara Shinkai

==== 2022 ====
- Azur Lane as SN Arkhangelsk, SN Sevastopol

==== 2025 ====
- Uma Musume: Pretty Derby as Loves Only You

=== Drama CD ===
- 38th Aimoto Girls High School Student Council Activity Journal Aipon (2014 - 2015) as Satoko Kozora.
- Momo Kyun Sword Special CD "Peach" (2015) as Akebi
- Fureraji☆ (2016) as Aoi Aoyagi
- In Another World With My Smartphone Drama CD 02 (2019) as Sakura

=== Radio ===
- A&G Artist Zone i☆Ris's 2h (2013 - 2014) as a member of i☆Ris
- Radio Animage (2015-）
- Dive II Station NewGenerations! (2015)
- Fureraji☆Real Radio (2015-)
- NACK5 SPECIAL "VOICE ACTORS RADIO" (2016）

=== Television ===
- Japacon★Wonderland (Narration, April 6, 2015 - September 19, 2016）
- Irakon (April 30, 2015-）

=== Stage ===
- Pripara "Minna ni Todoke! Prism☆Voice! (February 4–7, 2016 at the Zepp Blue Theater, Roppongi) as Sophy Hōjō
- SOLID STAR Produce Vol.7 "Bright Funeral" (June 15–19, 2016 at the Haiyuza Theater)
- Pripara "Minna ni Todoke! Prism☆Voice! 2017 (January 26–29, 2017 at the Zepp Blue Theater, Roppongi) as Sophy Hōjō
- KARATE MUSICAL「SAUCE」(July 6–13, 2017 at Zenrosai Hall /Space Zero)
- Nazotoki wa Dinner no Ato de, a recitation (November 23–26; December 2–3, 2017, Imagine Studio)
- Shin☆Yuki no Princess (February 21–25, 2018, New National Theatre Tokyo)
- Jekyll vs Hyde, a musical recitation (March 20, 2018, Tokyo FM Hall) as Marie
