= Iris (Japanese group) =

Japanese idol group

i☆Ris
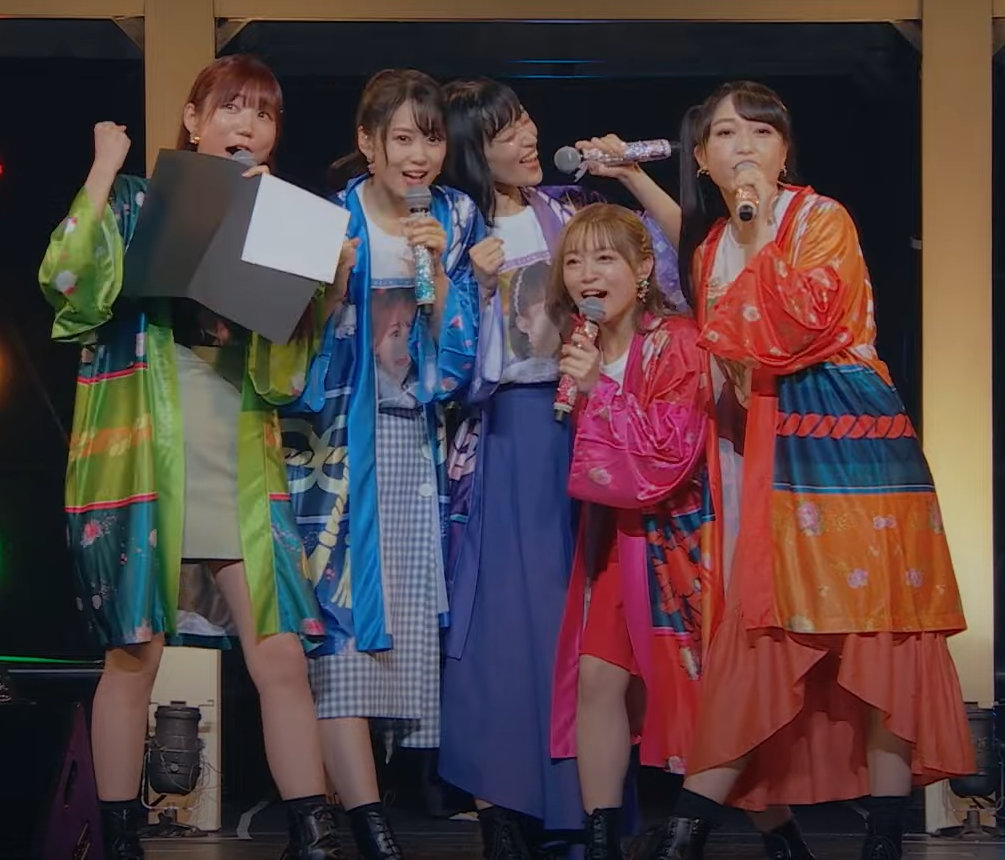
- i☆Ris in 2024

Background information
- Origin: Japan
- Genres: J-pop; anime song
- Years active: 2012–2027
- Label: Avex
- Members: Saki Yamakita; Yū Serizawa; Himika Akaneya; Yuki Wakai; Miyu Kubota
- Past members: Azuki Shibuya
- Website: iris.dive2ent.com

Iris (stylized as i☆Ris) is a Japanese idol girl group, formed in 2012 by Avex and 81 Produce. The group currently consists of five members: Saki Yamakita, Yū Serizawa, Himika Akaneya, Yuki Wakai, and Miyu Kubota. The leader is Saki Yamakita. In addition to their music career, all members are also active as voice actresses, most notably in the video game and anime series PriPara. The group has also performed themes for the anime series Wise Man's Grandchild, Magical Girl Site, Magical Sempai, and Twin Star Exorcists.

== History ==
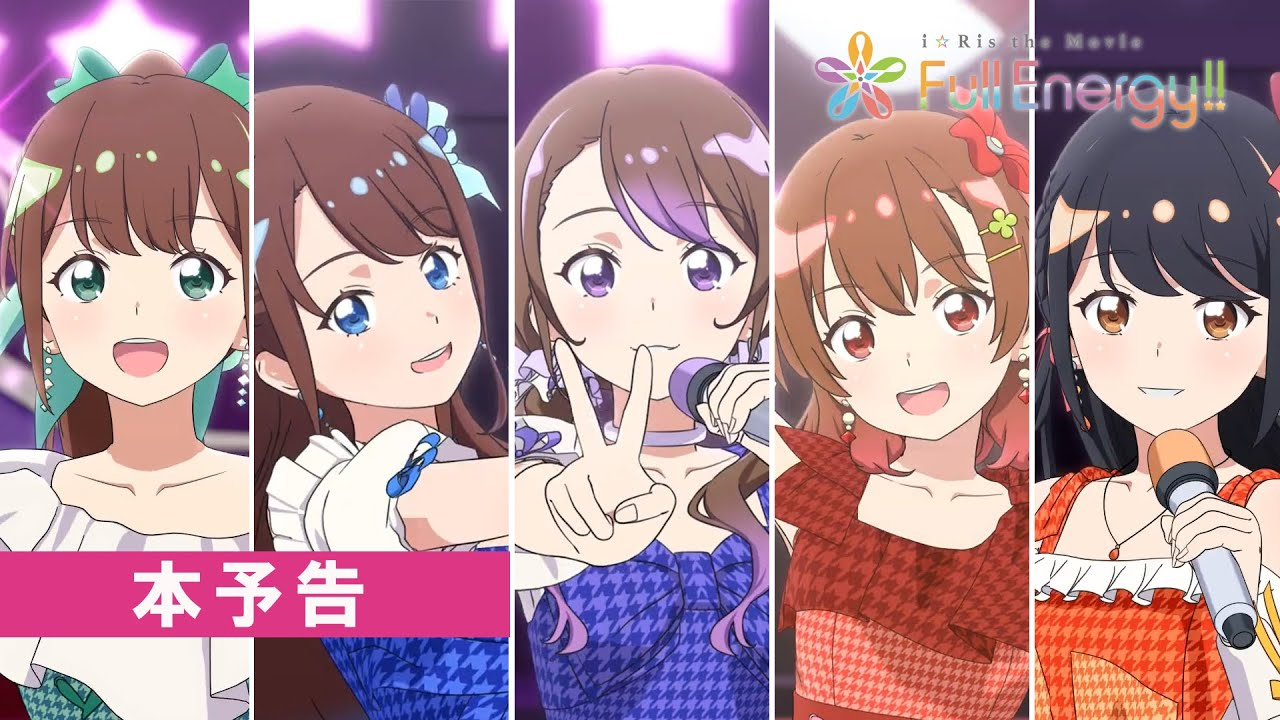
Animated depictions of Iris from Iris the Movie: Full Energy!!.

The group was formed as a result of the Anison Vocal Audition (アニソン・ボーカルオーディション, Anison Bōkaru Ōdishon) that was held in 2012 (of the six successful candidates). On November 7, 2012, the group debuted with its first single titled "Color" (on the label Avex). Their third single "Rainbow" was released on August 21, 2013.

On January 21, 2021, it was announced that Azuki Shibuya would graduate from the group on March 31.

On November 7, 2022, during the "i☆Ris 10th Anniversary Live 〜a Live〜" concert, an anime film titled Iris the Movie: Full Energy!! was announced and premiered in Japanese theaters on May 17, 2024.

On October 11, 2026, it was announced that i☆Ris would cease activities at the end of 2027.

== Members ==
=== Current members ===
- Saki Yamakita (山北早紀) - Leader
- Yū Serizawa (芹澤優)
- Himika Akaneya (茜屋日海夏)
- Yuki Wakai (若井友希)
- Miyu Kubota (久保田未夢)

=== Former members ===
- Azuki Shibuya (澁谷梓希)

== Discography ==
=== Singles ===
No.	Title	Release date	Standard Item Number			Charts	Album
No.	Title	Release date	CD+BD	CD+DVD	CD	JPN	Album
1	"Color"	November 7, 2012		AVCA-49961/B	AVCA-49962	100	We are Iris!!!
2	"Ichizu" (イチズ)	May 22, 2013		AVCA-62112/B (TYPE-A); AVCA-62113/B (TYPE-B)	AVCA-62114 (TYPE-C)	62	10th Anniversary Best Album 〜Best i☆Rist〜
3	"Rainbow"	August 21, 2013		AVCA-62579/B (TYPE-A); AVCA-62580/B (TYPE-B)	AVCA-62581 (TYPE-C)	37	We are Iris!!!
4	"Wonderland"	November 20, 2013		AVCA-62983/B (TYPE-A); AVCA-62984/B (TYPE-B)	AVCA-62985 (TYPE-C)	28	We are Iris!!!
5	"Itazura Taiyō" (徒太陽)	June 18, 2014		AVCA-74447/B	AVCA-74448	27	10th Anniversary Best Album 〜Best i☆Rist〜
6	"Make it!"	August 20, 2014		AVCA-74515/B	AVCA-74516	26	We are Iris!!!
7	"Miracle Paradise" (ミラクル☆パラダイス)	November 12, 2014		EYCA-10117/B	EYCA-10118	19	10th Anniversary Best Album 〜Best i☆Rist〜
8	"Realize!"	February 18, 2015		EYCA-10263/B	EYCA-10264	22	We are Iris!!!
9	"Dream Parade" (ドリームパレード)	July 8, 2015		EYCA-10503/B	EYCA-10504	8	Th!s !s i☆Ris!!
10	"Bright Fantasy" (ブライトファンタジー)	October 28, 2015		EYCA-10617/B	EYCA-10618	21	Th!s !s i☆Ris!!
11	"Goin' on"	February 7, 2016		EYCA-10798/B	EYCA-10799	8	Th!s !s i☆Ris!!
12	"Ready Smile!!"	June 1, 2016		EYCA-10998/B	EYCA-10999	9	Wonderful Palette
13	"Re:Call"	August 3, 2016		EYCA-11059/B	EYCA-11060	11	Wonderful Palette
14	"Shining Star"	March 8, 2017		EYCA-11306/B	EYCA-11307	10	Wonderful Palette
15	"Memorial"	February 21, 2018		EYCA-11850/B	EYCA-11851	18	Shall we☆Carnival
16	"Changing point"	May 9, 2018		EYCA-11869/B	EYCA-11870	8	Shall we☆Carnival
17	"Endless Notes"	February 13, 2019		EYCA-12282/B	EYCA-12281; EYCA-12283	12	Shall we☆Carnival
18	"Ultimate☆Magic"	May 22, 2019		EYCA-12510/B	EYCA-12509; EYCA-12511	8	Shall we☆Carnival
19	"Fantastic Illusion"	August 28, 2019		EYCA-12608/B	EYCA-12609; EYCA-12607	13	Shall we☆Carnival
20	"Summer Dude"	August 18, 2021	EYCA-13464/B	EYCA-13463/B	EYCA-13465	14	10th Anniversary Best Album 〜Best i☆Rist〜
21	"12gatsu no Snowry" (12月のSnowry) / "Heartbeat Kyujōsho" (ハートビート急上昇)	December 8, 2021	EYCA-13547/B	EYCA-13546/B	EYCA-13548	15	10th Anniversary Best Album 〜Best i☆Rist〜
22	"Queens Bluff"	August 3, 2022	EYCA-13824/B	EYCA-13823/B	EYCA-13825	11	10th Anniversary Best Album 〜Best i☆Rist〜
23	"Let you know! / Appare! Bakasawagi" (あっぱれ! 馬鹿騒ぎ")	August 23, 2023	EYCA-14161/B	EYCA-14160/B	EYCA-14162	9	―
24	"White Lyrical Kingdom / Kisekino-Filament" (キセキ-ノ-フィラメント)	January 24, 2024	EYCA-14264/B	EYCA-14263/B	EYCA-14265	10	―
25	"Ai for you! (愛 for you!) / "Kibou no Hana wo" (希望の花を)	June 12, 2024	EYCA-14362/B	EYCA-14361/B	EYCA-14363	13	―
26	"Yume e no Hitokakera" (夢へのヒトカケラ)	November 19, 2025				6	―
27	"Welcome to Azatosa World" (Welcome to あざとさワールド)	July 15, 2026				10	

=== Albums ===
No.	Album details	Standard Item Number			Charts
No.	Album details	CD+Blu-ray	CD+DVD	CD	JPN
—	Cover☆Ris (カバ☆リス, Kabarisu): Anison cover mini-album; Released: April 3, 2013		AVCA-62271/B		200
1	We are i☆Ris!!!: Released: April 8, 2015		EYCA-10433/B（TYPE-A） EYCA-10434/B（TYPE-B）	EYCA-10435（TYPE-C）	13
2	Th!s !s i☆Ris!!: Released: April 20, 2016	EYCA-10800/B	EYCA-10801/B	EYCA-10802	16
3	Wonderful Palette: Released: November 1, 2017	EYCA-11758/B	EYCA-11757/B	EYCA-11759	16
4	Shall we☆Carnival: Released: March 13, 2020	EYCA-12849/B		EYCA-12850	10
Best	10th Anniversary Best Album 〜Best i☆Rist〜: Released: November 7, 2022	EYCA-13872〜4/B〜C (3CD+2BD); EYCA-13875〜6/B (2CD+BD)		EYCA-13877/8 (2CD)	12
Best	i☆Ris Coupling Best: Released: March 20, 2024			EYCA-14279～80 (2CD)	25
5	Viva Idol: Released: April 30, 2025				21

=== DVDs / Blu-ray Discs ===
No.	Title	Charts
No.	Title	JPN DVD
1	"i☆Ris 1st ANNIVERSARY LIVE -THANK YOU ALL-": Format(s): DVD	71
2	"i☆Ris 1st Live Tour 2015 ~We are i☆Ris!! @ZEPP TOKYO": Released: September 16, 2015; Format(s): DVD, Blu-Ray	26 (Blu-Ray); 116 (DVD)
3	"i☆Ris Formation 4th Anniversary Live": Released: October 26, 2016; Format(s): DVD, Blu-Ray	
4	"i☆Ris 4th Anniversary Live ~418~ @NIPPON BUDOKAN": Released: April 5, 2017; Format(s): DVD, Blu-Ray	
5	"i☆Ris 5th Anniversary Live ～Go～": Released: August 29, 2018; Format(s): DVD, Blu-Ray	
6	"i☆Ris 6th Anniversary Live ～Lock on♡ 無理なんて言わせないっ!～": Released: March 6, 2019; Format(s): DVD, Blu-Ray	
7	" i☆Ris 5th Live Tour 2019 ～FEVER～": Released: October 16, 2019; Format(s): DVD, Blu-Ray	
8	"i☆Ris 7th Anniversary Live 〜七福万来〜": Released: April 17, 2020; Format(s): DVD, Blu-Ray	
9	"i☆Ris 8th Anniversary Live 〜88888888〜": Released: February 24, 2021; Format(s): DVD, Blu-Ray	
10	"i☆Ris LIVE 2021 〜storiez〜": Released: July 7, 2021; Format(s): DVD, Blu-Ray	18 (Blu-ray); 19 (DVD)
11	"i☆Ris Music Video Collection 2012–2020": Released: July 7, 2021; Format(s): DVD, Blu-Ray	
12	"i☆Ris 6th Live Tour 2021 ～Carnival～": Released: October 27, 2021; Format(s): DVD, Blu-Ray	
13	"i☆Ris 9th Anniversary Live 〜Queen's Message〜": Released: March 9, 2022; Format(s): DVD, Blu-Ray	
14	"i☆Ris 7th Live Tour 2022 ～Traveling～": Released: January 25, 2023; Format(s): DVD, Blu-Ray	
15	"i☆Ris 10th Anniversary Live 〜a Live〜": Released: July 7, 2023; Format(s): DVD, Blu-Ray	19 (Blu-ray); 20 (DVD)
