= List of Reborn as a Vending Machine, I Now Wander the Dungeon episodes =

Reborn as a Vending Machine, I Now Wander the Dungeon is an anime adaptation. It was later confirmed to be a television series produced by Slow Curve, animated by Studio Gokumi and AXsiZ and directed by Noriaki Akitaya, with Masayuki Takahashi serving as assistant director, Tatsuya Takahashi overseeing series scripts, Takahiro Sakai adapting Yūki Hagure's designs for animation, and Yuta Uraki and Keita Takahashi composing the music. The series aired from July 5 to September 20, 2023, on Tokyo MX and other networks. The opening theme song is "Fanfare" (ファンファーレ) by BRADIO, while the ending theme song is "Itsumo no Soup" (いつものスープ; "The Usual Soup") by Peel the Apple. (Note: "Fanfare" is used as an insert song in episode 24.) Crunchyroll streamed the series outside of Asia. The first season was released on Blu-ray and DVD in North America on July 23, 2024.

After the airing of the final episode of the first season, a second season was announced. The staff and cast reprised their roles, with Takashi Yamamoto replacing Akitaya as director. The season aired from July 2 to September 17, 2025. The opening theme song is "Mirai Cider" (未来サイダー; Future Cider) performed by BRADIO, while the ending theme song is "Boku Dake no Chiheisen" (僕だけの地平線; A Horizon Only for Me), performed by Aina Aiba.

After the airing of the final episode of the second season, a third season was announced. The season aired from April 1 to June 24, 2026. The opening theme song is "Jihankism" (ジハンキズム; Vending Machinism) performed by Vivarush, while the ending theme song is "Mekurumeku Rendezvous" (めくるめくランデヴー; Dazzling Rendezvous), performed by FUWAMOCO.

== Series overview ==
Season	Episodes	Originally released	
Season	Episodes	First released	Last released
1	12	July 5, 2023	September 20, 2023
2	12	July 2, 2025	September 17, 2025
3	12	April 1, 2026	June 24, 2026

== Episodes ==
=== Season 1 (2023) ===
No. overall	No. in season	Title	Directed by (Note: Production staff information is taken from the ending credits of each episode.)	Written by	Storyboarded by	Original release date
1	1	"The Vending Machine Travels"; Transliteration: "Jidōhanbaiki, Idō Suru" (Japanese: 自動販売機、移動する)	Mihiro Yamaguchi	Tatsuya Takahashi	Noriaki Akitaya	July 5, 2023
An unnamed man is killed in an accident involving a vending machine and reincarnates into another world as one himself. He discovers that he contains options to upgrade himself. Unfortunately, it costs points to charge his power supply and without a customer, he will lose power in one month. He is attacked by frog-like monsters, but discovers a blessing from God that generates a protective barrier. The monsters soon get bored and leave. A starving human hunter named Lammis later appears. The vending machine develops a way of communicating via stock phrases. He helps provide her with food and water. As her blessing is strength, Lammis decides to carry him, revealing they are in a dungeon on a secure level where adventurers have built a village. Along the way, Lammis saves a girl from some thugs. Lammis wants to show him to her friend Hulemy on the surface, but without money for the teleportation circle, she takes him to an inn where her friend Munami works. The vending machine becomes popular and he gains many points, allowing him to upgrade his items. Lammis acquires a frame to carry him on her back and names him "Boxxo".
2	2	"The King Frog Fiend Appears"; Transliteration: "Ōkawazujinma ga Arawareta" (Japanese: 王蛙人魔が現れた)	Tatsuya Fujinaka	Yutaka Yasunaga	Royden B & Hiroyuki Ōshima	July 12, 2023
Director Bear, an actual bear who is the director of the Hunter's Association, asks Lammis to bring Boxxo as food support for a large hunt to exterminate frog fiends. Kerioyl, leader of the Menagerie of Fools party, takes an interest in Boxxo, who decides he cannot be trusted. Filmina, Kerioyl's second-in-command, examines Boxxo, but senses no magic inside him. Meanwhile, Lammis becomes friends with a huntress named Shui. Boxxo decides to join the fight to protect Lammis. Lammis discovers that with Boxxo on her back as a counterweight, her usually poor control of her strength is negated. After the battle, Boxxo provides free sports drinks to the injured. Director Bear believes a king frog fiend is nearby and takes the remaining hunters to find it. That night, a hunter tries to break open Boxxo to steal his items, but Boxxo burns him with scalding soup and he is punished by Lammis. When the king frog fiend appears, Boxxo provides cola and some mints. The combined items are eventually used to blind the king enough for the hunters to return and slay it. With the hunt over, everyone returns to the village victorious.
3	3	"Rebuilding"; Transliteration: "Fukkō" (Japanese: 復興)	Masateru Nomi	Tatsuya Takahashi	Hiroyuki Ōshima	July 19, 2023
The party returns to the village, only to find it has been destroyed by a two-headed snake. Used to such things, the citizens kill the monster and begin rebuilding. Kerioyl asks Lammis and Boxxo to join his party, but Lammis refuses. Acowi, from the Merchants Exchange, reveals the village is running out of silver coins which are inside Boxxo. To get them back into circulation, she proposes buying them back with gold. Unfortunately, Boxxo cannot perform exchanges, though Lammis realizes by buying items with gold, Boxxo can return silver as change, which satisfies Acowi. Boxxo later adds a gambling function. Director Bear asks Boxxo to help Shirley, a brothel owner, so Boxxo sells her condoms to deal with diseases. A rich girl named Suori, who Lammis previously rescued, tries to vandalize Boxxo, but he stops her and also forgives her as she misses her absent father. Boxxo also begins selling soap at the public baths. Director Bear asks Boxxo to use his camouflage skill to catch criminals in the act. While disguised, Boxxo overhears Suori trying to buy him from Lammis, who refuses. Boxxo is overwhelmed with emotion by this before revealing himself to Lammis.
4	4	"Boxxo Is Abducted"; Transliteration: "Hakkon, Yūkai Sareru" (Japanese: ハッコン、誘拐される)	Mihiro Yamaguchi	Yutaka Yasunaga	Hirokazu Yamada	July 26, 2023
Boxxo is kidnapped by thieves, including Gugoyle, the hunter who tried to break him open previously. They take him to their hideout with a kidnapped magic item engineer, who turns out to be Lammis' friend Hulemy. She and Boxxo quickly become friends and with her expertise, she realizes Boxxo contains a human soul. That night, the thieves sneak in to attack Hulemy, but Boxxo persuades them to leave by dispensing pornographic magazines. The thieves' leader gives her two days to break Boxxo open or she will die. Shortly before the deadline, the hideout is attacked by Lammis and the Hunter's Association in search for Boxxo. The attack sets off explosives that buries Boxxo and Hulemy under rubble. They survive inside Boxxo's shield while he also provides Hulemy some oxygen. In turn, Hulemy provides Boxxo the thieves' gold to help maintain his shield. Lammis eventually finds and reunites with Boxxo and Hulemy. Kerioyl is revealed to have uncharacteristically aided in Boxxo's rescue for free by capturing the thieves, though he insists it is a ploy to eventually have Boxxo join the Menagerie of Fools and help Kerioyl achieve his dream.
5	5	"Vanity, Pride, and Vending Machine"; Transliteration: "Mie to Puraido to Jidōhanbaiki" (Japanese: 見栄とプライドと自動販売機)	Sumito Sasaki	Yutaka Yasunaga	Waruo Suzuki	August 2, 2023
While Lammis is embracing Boxxo, Hulemy reveals that Lammis hates losing people since her and Hulemy's parents were killed in a monster attack. Suori tells Hulemy there will be a gathering of merchant families and their magic item engineers. A girl from a rival family named Kanashi will be there, so she asks Hulemy to pretend to be her engineer and Boxxo as her latest magic item. Kanashi's engineer presents an automaton that obeys orders. Hulemy is outraged as it was made with a mind controlled human soul, which is against the law. When the automaton goes berserk, Hulemy helps free the trapped soul. As such, Kanashi is disqualified. Later, the village's restaurant owners panic when a popular restaurant called Chains opens a branch, so they ask Boxxo for help. After Lammis and Hulemy discover Chains' food is low quality. Boxxo provides several novel items, which the chefs reverse engineer so they can make them themselves. Chains goes out of business in only one month. Kerioyl asks Boxxo and Lammis to join a campaign. Despite Boxxo's mistrust, he decides to accompany Lammis as she wishes to keep improving her abilities.
6	6	"The Fighting Vending Machine"; Transliteration: "Tatakau Jidōhanbaiki" (Japanese: 戦う自動販売機)	Tōru Hamasaki	Tatsuya Takahashi	Hikaru Takeuchi & Kōji Yoshikawa	August 9, 2023
By providing free ingredients to make home cooked Oden, Boxxo facilitates love between a shy shopkeeper and a village guard named Gorth. Spring arrives and Kerioyl's party is organized to check the population of crocodile-fiends. Boxxo provides a portable toilet with a privacy tent, which the ladies are grateful for. Kerioyl decides to cull the crocodile-fiends to prevent them from hunting humans. Hulemy reveals to Boxxo Director Bear asked her to look out for a Stratum Lord, a rare monster similar to a dungeon boss. Almost immediately the Crocodile-Lord appears, forcing everyone to flee and leave Boxxo behind. Boxxo dispenses fried chicken to distract it, but is himself swallowed. Safe inside his barrier, Boxxo floods the Lord's stomach with cleaning chemicals and gas and then creates a spark by heating a tin can inside his microwave function, causing an explosion that kills the Lord. Boxxo receives a valuable coin as a reward, but magic leaking from the Lord's bones collapses the ground under him. As he plummets into an even lower stratum, all Boxxo can think about is a distraught Lammis.
7	7	"The Voracious Devils"; Transliteration: "Bōshoku no Akumadan" (Japanese: 暴食の悪魔団)	Tatsuya Fujinaka	Yutaka Yasunaga	Yō Nakano & Noriaki Akitaya	August 16, 2023
Boxxo lands in the next stratum, a giant maze. Defeating the Lord has given him one million points, which he spends leveling up to a Rank 2 vending machine. He is disappointed that the coin he received is just a medal proving he killed a Lord. As a Rank 2, he unlocks a solar panel to recharge his power without spending points. Eventually, he encounters four young creatures called Bearcats; Suco, Pell, Short and Mikenne. From their conversation, Boxxo deduces they are seeking treasure in the maze since they must eat a lot to survive. Unfortunately, they do not realize Boxxo is conscious, so they plan to sell him to Chains. They are attacked by a colossal Flame Skeletitan, the maze Stratum Lord, but the Bearcats escape with Boxxo. Despite Boxxo dispensing useful items to help them, they still do not realize he is conscious. As they reach the maze exit, they encounter Lammis and the Menagerie of Fools, who are thrilled they finally found Boxxo as Lammis was furious with Kerioyl for abandoning him. The Bearcats ally with the hunters and are dumbfounded when Director Bear explains about Boxxo's consciousness and unique method of speaking.
8	8	"The Flame Skeletitan of the Labyrinth Stratum"; Transliteration: "Meiro Kaisō no Enkyokotsuma" (Japanese: 迷路階層の炎巨骨魔)	Sumito Sasaki	Tatsuya Takahashi	Kazuma Takeya & Masayuki Takahashi	August 23, 2023
Kerioyl asks Boxxo to help defeat the Skeletitan, revealing the Menagerie of Fools believe a legend that anyone who receives a coin from defeating a stratum Lord then makes it all the way to the lowest stratum will be granted a wish by God. They need six coins in total, but only have three so far. Boxxo is intrigued as it could mean he can use his own coin to become human, though he also fears losing his usefulness as a vending machine. As the maze possesses its own traps, they plan to drop the Skeletitan into a large pit which they spend days filling with Boxxo's water and ice to extinguish the Skeletitan's protective flames. Boxxo also adds dry ice so the carbon dioxide smothers the flames even faster. Once the Skeletitan falls down the pit, Boxxo tricks Lammis into knocking him down there as well so he can use his weight to kill it. After dispensing helium balloons to lift himself out, Boxxo receives the Skeletitan's coin, but happily sells it to a grateful Kerioyl for 100 gold.
9	9	"A Less-than-Ideal Hero"; Transliteration: "Risō no Eiyū Miman" (Japanese: 理想の英雄未満)	Masateru Nomi	Yutaka Yasunaga	Waruo Suzuki	August 30, 2023
The group stop at the maze stratum's Hunter's Association headquarters. While the Menagerie of Fools return to Clearflow Lake village, Director Bear asks Lammis and Hulemy to begin mapping the maze. Mishuel, a young handsome hunter, begins working in the maze as well. However, once alone, Boxxo witnesses Mishuel's real personality where he is nervous and lacks confidence. Mishuel joins their group, even though it means working together for three weeks with his terrible communication skills. Lammis becomes unwell from getting her period, so Boxxo dispenses menstrual pads and transforms into a clothes washing machine to clean her clothes. The experience actually brings Mishuel out of his shell. After another week, they encounter assassins sent to kill Mishuel for a mysterious reason linked to his past. With Boxxo's help, they are easily defeated. Mishuel decides to leave, but Lammis suggests he join the Menagerie of Fools since they will not care about his past and will welcome his strength in battle. The group finally return home and find in Boxxo's absence, Chains has been using fake vending machines to sell their low quality food, though with Boxxo's return, they are quickly exposed and shut down.
10	10	"Gastric Measures"; Transliteration: "Ibukuro no Hate ni" (Japanese: 胃袋の果てに)	Sumito Sasaki	Tatsuya Takahashi	Shin'ichi Tanabe	September 6, 2023
The Restaurant Owners Union decide to hold an eating contest to attract people back to the village, which has finally been rebuilt. This backfires when Shui and the Bearcats, who are gluttonous, enter the contest. Afraid for their profits, the Union begs Boxxo's help, so he dispenses cola, which, if drunk by the contestants, will fill them faster. After an intense multi-round contest, Shui defeats the Bearcats and receives free access to Boxxo for 24 hours as her prize. With Lammis carrying Boxxo, Shui takes them to the Origin stratum that is closest to the surface, which houses an orphanage and uses her free 24 hours to feed, wash, clothe, and entertain the children. Shui explains the Origin stratum acts as a sort of test to allow access to lower stratums, meaning that it tends to collect people not strong enough to survive yet, like children whose parents died during the test. At night, bandits try to steal Boxxo's items, but he takes their photos, then scares them away with mist, ice, and creepy music. The orphanage director, a retired hunter stronger than Kerioyl, later "takes care of" the bandits to protect the children.
11	11	"The Dead's Lament Stratum"; Transliteration: "Mōja no Nageki Kaisō" (Japanese: 亡者の嘆き階層)	Sumito Sasaki & Masateru Nomi	Yutaka Yasunaga	Waruo Suzuki	September 13, 2023
The Menagerie of Fools ask Boxxo to accompany them to Dead's Lament, a stratum of undead which scares Lammis. When the dead wander about overnight, the creepy guild secretary explains they envy the living and often peer in windows as though trying to enter, but are harmless as long as the living stay indoors at night. To get over her fear, Hulemy tells Lammis to go shopping alone but she clings to Boxxo terrified. Kerioyl plans to hunt the stratum lord, the King of Souls. As night arrives again, Boxxo encounters an undead child seemingly asking for a drink. Curious by the sign of potential intelligence, Boxxo dispenses a bottle and is amazed when the boy attempts to drink it, and the same thing happens several nights in a row. One night, the Menagerie of Fools camp outside the village and the same boy follows them to see Boxxo, who fails to save him. Boxxo realizes the boy had been carrying a copper coin in an attempt to buy something, and is deeply saddened. Kerioyl reveals the King of Souls is a magic user, so their plan to defeat it will rely heavily on Boxxo's impenetrable barrier.
12	12	"What Can Be Done as a Vending Machine"; Transliteration: "Jidōhanbaiki Toshite Dekiru Koto" (Japanese: 自動販売機として出来ること)	Sumito Sasaki & Tatsuya Fujinaka	Tatsuya Takahashi	Sumito Sasaki & Noriaki Akitaya	September 20, 2023
The party locates the King of Souls, a skeleton possessing intelligence. Relying on her strength, Lammis avoids his spells before using Boxxo to crush the King. The King is revealed to only have been a fragment of an even more powerful undead, the Netherlord. Hulemy and Shui are mortally wounded protecting Lammis. Deciding to trust herself, Lammis puts Boxxo down to use all her strength and destroys Netherlord's staff. An impressed Netherlord retreats. Boxxo becomes an emergency defibrillator and spends all his available points acquiring the telekinesis skill to operate it himself, reviving Hulemy and Shui. They return home to inform Director Bear of the Netherlord. He contacts the directors of each stratum to begin assembling an army of the most skilled adventurers to combat this powerful foe. Kerioyl considers abandoning his goal to ensure the party's safety, but they convince him to keep going. Lammis takes Boxxo to the spot where she first found him and thanks him for everything. Hulemy and Shui secretly follow and thank Boxxo for saving their lives by kissing his screen. They make a jealous Lammis kiss him too. Boxxo decides life as a vending machine is not so bad.

=== Season 2 (2025) ===
No. overall	No. in season	Title	Directed by	Written by	Storyboarded by	Original release date
13	1	"Hunters and Motives"; Transliteration: "Hantā to Omowaku" (Japanese: ハンターと思惑)	Yukio Kuroda	Tatsuya Takahashi	Takashi Yamamoto	July 2, 2025
Lammis returns to the village to meet up with Boxxo, who is being watched over by Karios and Gorth. Director Bear invites the four to the Dead Lament's stratum to meet up with a group of new hunters. They begin forming a plan to defeat the Netherlord and Director Bear explains the history of the Demon Lord. The newcomers agree to help as they prepare for a rematch against the Netherlord. They are also joined by Karios, Gorth, the orphanage director Hoxie, the elderly couple Shimelai and Yumite, and a large group of hunters. The group split up to search for the Netherlord. Lammis' group eventually find the Netherlord, who is fighting another group of hunters, and join the battle against his army. They eventually defeat the Netherlord, only to find that it is a decoy. The real Netherlord then disappears and lets everyone go while ensuring that they cannot leave the dungeon as he intends to take control of it and seize its power for his own means, and proceeds to attack the other stratums.
14	2	"Mutual Understanding"; Transliteration: "Ishi no Sotsū" (Japanese: 意思の疎通)	Hodaka Kuramoto	Shōta Gotō	Takashi Yamamoto	July 9, 2025
The group quickly rush back to the village. Returning to the Hunters Association building, they find people taking refuge inside. Outside, Hulemy and Boxxo discovers that frog and crocodile fiends have caused severe damage to the village and the hunters, including Shirley and Gocguy, are trying to fight them off. Once she reveals her past, a tired Lammis still attempts to fight. However, Boxxo convinces her to stop, using the letters in his limited speech to spell what he wants to say. Returning to the terrace, Boxxo takes down the monsters using candy and cola. That night, the Bearcats arrive and Boxxo gives them something to eat. Boxxo requests for Lammis to put him down in the battlefield, but she refuses until Hulemy convinces her to as she believes that Boxxo has a plan. After a while, Boxxo surrounds the building in his giant ice vending machine form. However, he discovers that his points are draining rapidly, forcing him to retreat. The next day, Director Bear forms a plan and requests for Boxxo to help using his giant ice machine form. Needing money to sustain it, Suori arrives to help.
15	3	"Strong Feelings"; Transliteration: "Tsuyoi Kanjō" (Japanese: 強い感情)	Tatsuya Fujinaka	Yutaka Yasunaga	Takashi Yamamoto & Moe Katō	July 16, 2025
Suori, Lammis, Mishuel, Shirley, and the Bearcats head to Suori's mansion to find a vault containing enough gold coins for Boxxo to maintain his giant ice vending machine form. Back at the Hunters Association building Boxxo gives the people ice cream due to the heat, revealing that he can only keep his alternate forms for an hour. Hulemy plans to repair the wall at night when there are fewer monsters. At the right time, Boxxo changes into his giant ice vending machine form and creates metal slabs to cover the hole, enabling the hunters to fend off the monsters while Lammis and a group of mages cover the hole with earth magic. Boxxo discovers that someone working for the Netherlord is controlling the monsters with a dark ring, and forces him to stop the attack. Taking the ring, Director Bear interrogates the man while Boxxo helps Lammis repair the wall. Lammis loses her temper at the man as it was he who destroyed her village, then apologizes to Boxxo for her outburst. She then expresses feelings for him, which turns out to be a joke.
16	4	"The Clergyman and the Vending Machine"; Transliteration: "Bokushi to Jidō Hanbaiki" (Japanese: 牧師と自動販売機)	Mikifumi Yamane	Tatsuya Takahashi	Takashi Yamamoto	July 23, 2025
As the monsters' corpses are burnt, the wall is repaired and the townsfolks start rebuilding the town. As the heat begins to build up, people begin begging Boxxo for more ice cream, but he leads them to a swimming pool that he made earlier so they can cool off. The transfer circle is soon repaired, but it can only send a few people as Director Bear intends to have a small group go to the Origin stratum. After the Menagerie of Fools enjoy a feast, the group prepare to evacuate the Clearflow Lake stratum. Director Origin, the stratum’s director, thanks Boxxo and Hulemy for their efforts. Shui, Mishuel, Lammis, and Boxxo accompany her group to a prison where people are taking refuge, but all the cells are empty. The only one here is a clergyman named Hevee, a former member of the Menagerie of Fools. He removes the illusion that he placed earlier, revealing that the refugees are still there and that he had saved them all from the monsters. That night, Hevee deducts that Boxxo contains a human soul inside of him and thinks that they are very much like, though Boxxo does not agree.
17	5	"Respective Wishes"; Transliteration: "Onōno no Nozomi" (Japanese: 各々の望み)	Tatsuya Fujinaka	Shōta Gotō	Kōichi Okizaki	July 30, 2025
Boxxo reviews his abilities and forms, and discovers that Rank 3 costs a lot of points. After the transfer circle is fully repaired, Boxxo learns that there are eight stratums in all as everyone on the Origin stratum is evacuated to the Clearflow Lake stratum. Hulemy also suspects that the Netherlord has more servants controlling the monsters. The Menagerie of Fools fight off monsters in the Origin stratum. Afterwards, half of the group reach a nearby lake where they decide to go swimming. Returning to the others, Boxxo takes on a new form to provide everyone with lunch. The group reach the deepest part of the Origin stratum. Taking another new form, Boxxo floods a canyon with pachinko balls to give the group an advantage over the monsters. Both Lammis and Boxxo work together to take down the monsters and discover the female commander controlling them, with Lammis destroying her Netherlord ring. As the commander is taken into custody, Lammis learns that Filmina is half-vamp fiend, though she is not bothered by it. Everyone then shares their wishes. Back at the orphanage, Director Origin, with Boxxo's assistance, provides a meal for everyone.
18	6	"Sweet Temptation"; Transliteration: "Amai Yūwaku" (Japanese: 甘い誘惑)	Yukio Kuroda	Yutaka Yasunaga	Takashi Yamamoto	August 6, 2025
Hulemy connects the transfer circle between Clearflow Lake and Origin Stratums while ensuring that monsters cannot use it. The Menagerie of Fools arrange another meeting in the Origin Stratum, their original base, recalling that a wish will be granted upon reaching the bottom, but a dungeon floor will disappear in the process. Kerioyl takes everyone to a room where his and Filmina's eldest son Kai sleeps inside a crystal, revealing that they are married and Aka and Shiro are also their sons. They placed Kai inside the crystal to slow his Decay curse. Kerioyl and Filmina ask the others to ally with the Netherlord, having made a deal with him to save their son in exchange for conquest of the dungeon. Lammis, Boxxo, Shui, Hevee, Mishuel, and Hulemy oppose the idea, leading to a fight. Hevee reveals his blessing that allows him to manipulate someone's senses. Kerioyl reveals his blessing that allows him to disable other blessings, which he uses to remove Hevee's power and Boxxo's barrier before his group escapes. They tell Director Bear and Director Origin about Kerioyl's ulterior motives before returning to the Clearflow Lake Stratum. The transfer circle has been hijacked, making everyone disappear and leaving Boxxo alone, though Director Bear and Hulemy return; they have ended up in the Labyrinth Stratum. Boxxo wonders where Lammis is.
19	7	"The Animals and the Girl"; Transliteration: "Dōbutsu to Shōjo" (Japanese: 動物と少女)	Tatsuya Fujinaka	Yutaka Yasunaga	Tatsuya Fujinaka	August 13, 2025
Hulemy deduces that Kerioyl tampered with the transfer circle. With Director Bear carrying Boxxo, they head to the Hunter's Association building where Boxxo provides food. Boxxo and Director Bear go into the labyrinth to find a magic stone, where they rescue a girl named Kikoyu and her two monster companions Botan and Kuroyata from orcs. Kikoyu has the ability to hide her presence and can read people's thoughts by touching them. She mentions a sentient field (who is simply named Field) who had gone dormant in the Demon Lord's domain. Kikoyu carries a piece of Field that can quickly grow crops and turn dead bodies into nutrients. Boxxo suspects that Field, like Boxxo, might be a reincarnated human from the same world as him. Kikoyu likes Boxxo's food, but she and Boxxo get competitive over giving out food. Director Bear suspects Kikoyu is one of the nearly-extinct Snow Children, revealing that beheading them before adulthood will turn them into an ice statue that can remove curses. They are determined to protect Kikoyu from Kerioyl, who might want to use her to cure Kai. They discover that the Piece of Field cannot leave the labyrinth due to it having monster corpses inside it, so Boxxo disrupts the labyrinth's barrier with his own, allowing Kikoyu to pass through. Joined by Hulemy and with the help of Lammis, who managed to find her way here, the group traps the lava fiend and obtain its magic stone.
20	8	"The Dark Forest Stratum"; Transliteration: "Yami no shinrin kaisō" (Japanese: 闇の森林階層)	Hodaka Kuramoto	Shōta Gotō	Kōichi Okizaki	August 20, 2025
Director Bear, Kikoyu, and her monsters use the transfer circle to return to the Clearflow Lake Stratum, but Lammis, Boxxo, and Hulemy end up in the Dark Forest Stratum instead. Hulemy removes a malfunction spell that Kerioyl planted on Boxxo earlier, but they are stuck until the transfer circle recharges. They find and help Shui, Hevee, and the others defeat carrot and turnip fiends, and they learn that the humanoid trees around them are people transformed by the stratum's giant tree lord. The stratum's director, Director Dark, is a humorous dark humanoid figure. Boxxo outplays his humor by transforming into a manzai vending machine broadcasting a joke channel. Director Bear arrives with Kikoyu, her monsters, Shimelai, Yumite, and the Bearcats, Shimelai having activated the transfer circle from their end. They capture a village woman, who is a commander working for the Netherlord, thanks to Kikoyu and Boxxo. Hevee uses his powers to make her see him as the Netherlord and trick her into revealing her motive, learning that Kerioyl's group came through here before. Director Dark knocks out Hevee due to his shoe addiction getting the better of him. The group resolve to turn the humanoid trees back into people.
21	9	"Conflagration"; Transliteration: "Dai Enjō" (Japanese: 大炎上)	Masateru Nōmi	Tatsuya Takahashi	Warurō Suzuki	August 27, 2025
The group fight through the forest to reach the stratum lord, learning that its original gentleness was corrupted by the Netherlord. Boxxo provides ramen noodles and burgers, and the following night, Kikoyu provides meals of her own. They learn that this stratum once burned down and fire is now forbidden. They build a public bath for the girls while Boxxo, Botan, and Kuroyata stand guard. The forest suddenly catches fire; someone is attempting to burn the stratum lord, which could destroy the tree humans. Hulemy instructs Boxxo to pour gas on the fire to make it clear out all the trees. Boxxo protects everyone with his barrier as the fire stops, but loses lots of points in the process. The others give Boxxo money in return. Lammis punches the stratum lord to confirm that it is dead, but this awakens the ghostly woman Kayolings, who is working for the Netherlord and started the fire. The group defeat and capture her using magic. The tree humans are returned to normal and the group returns to the Clearflow Lake Stratum. Boxxo begins developing a rivalry with Kikoyu over providing food.
22	10	"The Dungeon Goddess Grand Prix"; Transliteration: "Danjon Megami Guranpuri" (Japanese: ダンジョン女神グランプリ)	Miyuki Hokiwara	Shōta Gotō	Takashi Yamamoto	September 3, 2025
Munami announces the "Dungeon Goddess Grand Prix", a beauty and talent contest. Lammis thinks Munami is getting too close to Boxxo. Munami bribes Lammis and Hulemy into taking part in it. Boxxo turns into a printer to promote the contest. Boxxo turns into a magazine vending machine to show fashionable clothing to give them ideas. Director Bear appoints Boxxo as one of the judges. Munami introduces the contestants - including Director Origin, forced by Director Dark to take part in it. Hulemy, Lammis, and Shui request Boxxo's help in beating Shirley. Boxxo turns into a cosmetics vending machine to give Lammis and Hulemy makeup. The contestants show off their special talents, though Hulemy and Lammis mess up their act. Shirley drops out to avoid getting too much attention. Hevee considers Director Origin the winner, but Munami announces the winner is Lammis, who is awarded with tickets for free usage of Boxxo and magic boots from Suori's company. The group learns that the boots were found in the Scorching Sand Stratum by Suori's father. A celebration is held, after which Shui informs Boxxo that Hevee is gone.
23	11	"Into the Scorching Desert"; Transliteration: "Shakunetsu no Sabaku e" (Japanese: 灼熱の砂漠へ)	Yukio Kuroda	Yutaka Yasunaga	Kōichi Okizaki	September 10, 2025
Lammis, Shui, and Boxxo search for Hevee in the Scorching Sand Stratum. Due to it being so hot, Boxxo keeps them cool by lowering his temperature and Lammis wears the outfit that Boxxo made for her. They meet Mishuel and the stratum director Scorching, who claims to have captured one of the Netherlord's monster commanders. Boxxo provides water for everyone. Lammis questions the merchant who supplied the magic shoes, who says they came from Tashtay, a hunter. Shui finds Hevee, who explains he wanted to give special boots to his childhood friend, but she was killed by bandits along with a merchant they were transporting and everyone else in their adventuring party. His shoe obsession stems from this, a cover for his true objective. Hulemy, Kikoyu, Botan, and Kuroyata arrive with supplies to withstand the heat. The group sets off towards "the Desert Pillar" in search for Tashtay. Kuroyata disappears, and it transpires that a spell hides the tower's true distance, which is actually close by. Kuroyata returns and warns them of bandits. The group defeats monsters in the tower, and suspect the "captured commander" was a decoy. Boxxo protects the group from traps. Encountering Tashtay and his gang: the Billowing Flames, the group learn that he is working for the Netherlord and intended to use the monsters to attack the town. It was he who killed Hevee's friend as well as all those who traveled with them then. Hevee plans vengeance.
24	12	"Blizzard in the Desert"; Transliteration: "Sabaku no Fubuki" (Japanese: 砂漠の吹雪)	Tatsuya Fujinaka	Tatsuya Fujinaka	Naotaka Hayashi	September 17, 2025
Hevee reveals his strength while fighting the bandits. Tashtay unleashes the Duel Ogre, but it proves uncontrollable. Boxxo pours barbecue sauce over corpses to make it stop and eat them. The ogre is revealed to be the stratum lord. Hevee and Boxxo, disguised as a rock ogre, give the ogre enough alcohol to put it to sleep. Hulemy injects a chemical that weakens its skin, allowing Mishuel and Lammis to kill it. Kikoyu uses her Piece of Field to absorb the monster and obtains a Skeletitan's coin in return. It is suddenly freezing cold and Tashtay is frozen in ice. Kikoyu has everyone shelter from a blizzard behind Boxxo's barrier. A snow fairy named Sulream appears and kills Tashtay. She reveals she works for the Netherlord after he saved her from humans in the past. She unleashes a blizzard to kill them. Kikoyu reveals that Sulream is an alternate future version of herself and counters Sulream’s blizzard with her own; since today is her birthday, she has become adult and her powers are amplified. Sulream retreats. Lammis is jealous of Boxxo's liking for Kikoyu. The group celebrates with a snowball fight. Sulream recruits Kerioyl and his family to help deal with Boxxo, Lammis, and their allies.

=== Season 3 (2026) ===
No. overall	No. in season	Title	Directed by	Written by	Storyboarded by	Original release date
25	1	"Each to Their Own Story"; Transliteration: "Sorezore no Monogatari e" (Japanese: それぞれの物語へ)	Tatsuya Fujinaka	Shōta Gotō	Warurō Suzuki	April 1, 2026
Back at the Scorching Sand Stratum's town, Boxxo and Kikoyu sell frozen foods to people; however, the two are still very competitive over customers, getting their friends to help them. The team soon return to the Clearflow Lake Stratum. After several days pass, Lammis brings Boxxo to a tent where everyone celebrate his and Kikoyu's birthday despite not knowing Boxxo's exact birthday and Boxxo is given gifts. A drunk Lammis begins expressing her feelings for Boxxo. The following night, Kikoyu explains to Boxxo that she and her animal companions plan to leave the dungeon soon, hoping to eventually find and revive Field. She also hopes to see Boxxo again someday. Kikoyu has also found a way out of the dungeon despite the Netherlord's magic preventing anyone from leaving, but also writes letters to everyone explaining her departure. The Dog Mountain and the Everlasting Stratums are the only places left unexplored. They first travel to the Dog Mountain Stratum, which consists of an ocean with islands, beach huts, and a large rock shaped like a dog. They learn from the inhabitants that Kerioyl and his family were here before. The director of this stratum is a young boy, whom they give a letter from Director Bear regarding their search for someone. Lammis, Hulemy, and Boxxo decide to go fishing and Boxxo provides them with bait, but since he can't sell fishing poles, the girls have to make the poles themselves. After catching lots of fish and a giant clam, they decide to cook them. However, Hevee and Shui recognize the clam and quickly stop the others from cooking it. The clam then opens, revealing that a girl with green hair named Pity is inside it.
26	2	"The Clam and the Vending Machine"; Transliteration: "Kai to Jidō Hanbaiki" (Japanese: 貝と自動販売機)	Hodaka Kuromoto	Yutaka Yasunaga	Warurō Suzuki	April 8, 2026
Director Scorching joins the team as they travel the Dog Mountain Stratum by boat. Pity reveals that she sank herself into the ocean to avoid joining Kerioyl while also waiting for him to come back for her. Pity also recognizes Sulream, but is also fearful of Director Scorching before Boxxo cheers her up with sweets. As the gang try to get Pity to overcome her shyness, Boxxo reveals a new form: a viewfinder. They spot where Kerioyl and his family are hiding. Hevee disguises everyone as random people, except for Pity. After Pity still refuses to ally with Kerioyl, he uses his powers to remove the team's disguise. The team head outside to resume the confrontation. After an interrogation, Sulream arrives with Kai, whom Sulream had revived, but under threat to make Kerioyl's family serve the Netherlord. Director Scorching appears and uses his flame powers to counter Sulream's ice powers. Since his kind doesn't fare well with snow fairies, it explains why Director Bear sent him to help the team. After Director Scorching disappears with Sulream, Filmina and her sons reveal their vampire forms as both sides battle each other. Boxxo, Lammis, Pity, and Hevee defeat Filmina and her sons while Mishuel fights Kerioyl, with Boxxo threatening Aka to force him to surrender. When Kerioyl decides to instead go help Sulream fight Director Scorching, the team try to intervene, but Sulream reveals that Boxxo is their true target as she engulfs him with her powers.
27	3	"A Stay in Enemy Territory"; Transliteration: "Tekichi Taizai" (Japanese: 敵地滞在)	Yukio Kuroda	Tatsuya Fujinaka	Kōichi Okizaki	April 15, 2026
Boxxo and Pity are captured by Kerioyl and his family and are imprisoned in a cell in the Netherlord's fortress. They need food supplies from him and also reveal that they wanted Pity to help them in exchange for bringing back her ex-lover. She still refuses the offer and Boxxo makes getting food supplies hard for them. That night, Boxxo provides Pity with a toilet, a bed, and plays music for her. The two still refuse to help Kerioyl, but are given a week to decide whether to side with the Netherlord or be executed. Boxxo makes Aka and Shiro pass out, but Filmina catches them in the act and she and her sons bring Boxxo to see Sulream, who is treating Kai like a little brother. It turns out he was pretending to be under threat this whole time. Since Boxxo is the only witness, they are sure that he cannot tell the others due to his limited speech. After Sulream leaves, it is revealed that Kai is aware of her true colors and was pretending to bond with her all along. He wishes to bring an end to his pain and help Boxxo escape before the deadline. Boxxo continues to remain at the fortress to dig up dirt on the Netherlord's schemes, but he also grows attracted to Pity. When the deadline arrives, Pity and Boxxo meet Sulream and Kai on the roof. With Sulream distracted with needing to use the bathroom, Boxxo and Pity escape using balloons and Boxxo's forcefield while Pity alters their weight (revealed to be her blessing) so they can get airborne. Boxxo also changes into an air blowing machine so they can propel themselves away, but they are chased by the Nethorlord's Middle Finger General, a shark-like monster who can communicate with Boxxo telepathy. It attempts to stop them from escaping, but they manage to defeat it using Boxxo's giant ice machine form and continue their getaway. Boxxo worries about how the Netherlord will react to this.
28	4	"The Troubles Will Continue Forever"; Transliteration: "Kunan wa Tsudzuku yo Doko Made mo" (Japanese: 苦難は続くよどこまでも)	Tatsuya Fujinaka	Yutaka Yasunaga	Satoshi Nakagawa	April 22, 2026
Boxxo and Pity land on a boat that brings them back to the island, where Boxxo reunites with Lammis and Hulemy. Boxxo gives them some gifts, but Lammis and Hulemy start to get jealous of Pity bonding with Boxxo. The team plan to destroy the fortress that Boxxo and Pity were previously taken to in hopes of hindering the Netherlord's plans and find a way to break the curse that was cast on Kai to get Kerioyl's family to betray the Netherlord. Boxxo shows them videos of Kai bonding with Sulream. However, they learn that the fortress is deserted and the Dog Mountain, which is the stratum's lord, is heading their way. As the villagers evacuate, the team stay to fight it. Pity and Boxxo manage to freeze it for a while, but the team return to Clearflow Lake stratum afterwards. However, Boxxo now has to help Shirley attract costumers. Gorth is revealed to have feelings for Shirley, so Boxxo has Lammis, Hulemy, and Suco help find out more about Shirley. While hiding in front of Shirley's house, they stop some men from breaking in. During Shirley's day off, the four follow her to the orphanage where they see her talking to Hoxie and making donations. However, they discover that Shirley was aware that they were following her. After spending the day at the orphanage, they return home where Boxxo shows Gorth what he learned via videos. Gorth decides to not win her over just yet. Shirley later reveals someone has been stealing from her, but those thefts have been stopped thanks to Gorth. The latter then shows up and Boxxo gets them to interact and form romance, though Gorth gets a bit jealous when he learns that Shirley likes Boxxo too.
29	5	"Another Uproar"; Transliteration: "Sōran Futatabi" (Japanese: 騒乱再び)	Hodaka Kuromoto	Tatsuya Fujinaka	Kōichi Okizaki	April 29, 2026
The team talk about the Everlasting Stratum, the only place that hasn't been conquered as well as the lowest part of the dungeon. It is said to be extremely dark and has three paths, which was why Kerioyl needed Boxxo's help as the stratum takes a year to get through; Kerioyl required food supplies from Boxxo to ensure survival in the stratum. Boxxo on the other hand is close to reaching Rank 3. However, they know that the Netherlord might try to stop them. They later learn that Kayolings has escaped from prison, and that someone had broken her out. A horde of monsters approach the village, but they are not attacking yet. They suspect that the Netherlord is attempting to keep them from reaching the Everlasting Stratum. Boxxo and Suori provide the villagers with supplies and weaponry to prepare for battle. The team decide to attack the monsters head on to lure them to the village so the villagers can ambush them. Although they manage to defeat them all, they encounter a crocodile lord; Boxxo had defeated one before. After killing it using Boxxo's giant ice machine form, everyone celebrates back at the village. Boxxo at last has enough points to reach Rank 3, gaining access to the forms of every vending machine that has ever existed. The next day, the team begin their journey to navigate the Everlasting Stratum.
30	6	"Yesterday's Enemies Are Today's"; Transliteration: "Kinō no Teki wa Kyō no" (Japanese: 昨日の敵は今日の)	Tatsuya Fujinaka	Shōta Gotō	Satoshi Nakagawa	May 6, 2026
The group visit the Hunters Association in the Everlasting Stratum, where they learn more about the stratum itself. Boxxo unveils one of his new forms, which deploys a two-seated car, and also changes into a gas pump to provide it with fuel. Hulemy attaches a cart that Director Bear sent them, which she had modified, to the back of the car for the team to ride in. She also has a small box that Director Bear gave them earlier, and they plan to open it when they reach the heart of the stratum. The team begin their journey across the Everlasting stratum. During their trip, they stop to practice sparring with each other or do workouts at some points to stay in shape and Boxxo provides them all with meals, music, movies, manga, and games for entertainment to prevent boredom or starvation. They eventually come across Aka and Shino, who are starving. After giving them food, the two explain that they and their parents are no longer working for the Netherlord, who planned to dispose of them and Sulream for letting Boxxo escape. As a result, Sulream turned against the Netherlord, brought Kerioyl's family and herself to the Everlasting Stratum, and severed the Netherlord's curse that binds their loyalty to him. The group soon meet up with Kerioyl, Kai, Filmina, and Sulream. Kai persuades Sulream to put aside her hatred of humans and help the team due to their bond. Kerioyl's family reconcile with the team as they continue their travels. After three weeks, they reach a fortress. However, even Lammis's strength cannot open the door. Boxxo notices that the stratum lord coins are the keys needed to open it.
31	7	"The Beginning of the End"; Transliteration: "Owari no Hajimari" (Japanese: 終わりの始まり)	Yukio Kuroda	Yukio Kuroda	Warurō Suzuki	May 13, 2026
After inserting all the coins in the door's slots, the team discover that they are still missing two stratum lord coins. They already have one of them. Opening the box that Director Bear gave them, they find the other stratum coin; Director Bear had defeated the Dog Mountain in the past. After the team talk about their wishes, they are concerned that only one wish can be granted, but they know that there are other dungeons in the world that they can conquer. Entering the fortress, they reach a throne room. An elderly man carrying a staff welcomes them; it was he who created the dungeon. He is known as the Dungeon Master and also holds a grudge against the Netherlord. He makes a table appear and Boxxo provides them with meals while questions are asked. The Dungeon Master explains more about the role of the dungeons and their creators. Any kind of wish can be made, but not all wishes can be granted though. He can remove Kai's curse and turn Boxxo human; however, granting two wishes at the same time will destroy the dungeon, so Boxxo sacrifices his chance to be human again so to get rid of Kai's curse. Suddenly, the bracelet that Sulream was wearing attacks and wounds the Dungeon Master; it was the Netherlord in disguise. He planned this all along so he can at last seize control of the dungeon. Sulream ends her loyalty to the Netherlord for good. The Netherlord proceeds to make the dungeon collapse and bring the monsters to the surface while leaving the humans to die before leaving. The dying Dungeon Master creates a transfer circle to send them back to the Clearflow Lake stratum so they can escape the dungeon while he slows the dungeon's collapse as he will disappear once a wish is granted. They tell Director Bear the news as they help everyone get the Origin stratum so they can reach the exit, but monsters ambush them during the evacuation. The team fight them off, but the Netherlord, having allowed their escape, summons an army of monsters. Boxxo takes his giant ice vending machine form and activates his barrier, having been given wealth by the Dungeon Master so he can maintain that form longer, choosing to stay behind to hold the Netherlord back. This plan fails since the Netherlord still has connections to Sulream's bracelet as he teleports Sulream and Kerioyl's family to him. He attempts to force Kerioyl to remove Boxxo's barrier. Boxxo removes his barrier himself and suffers terrible damage from monster attacks, but Sulream use this opportunity to help everyone escape outside after the Netherlord lets his guard down and Kerioyl disables his influence on them with his blessing.
32	8	"As an Apprentice"; Transliteration: "Deshi to Shite" (Japanese: 弟子として)	Masateru Nōmi	Shōta Gotō	Kōichi Okizaki	May 20, 2026
Everyone has made it outside safely (except for Boxxo, who was left behind) while the dungeon is destroyed and the Netherlord has merged the stratum lords together to form a giant monster. After the group establish a small camp, the Bearcats go ahead to warn a nearby fortified city of the attack while Kerioyl's family and Sulream stay behind to fight off monsters. The rest of the group believe that Boxxo is still alive and use the car and cart from earlier to go look for him. Director Bear, Hevee, Gorth, and Karios head to the fortified city. Mishuel heads to the Murderous Forest where he encounters the Forefinger General, who is another general working for the Netherlord and was the one who broke Kayolings out. He proves to be a strong foe, but Mishuel is saved by four rabbit-like creatures called essigs along with their friend Hayachi, Mishuel's elder sister. After killing the general, Mishuel learns about a Guardian who fought the Demon Lord and he tells Hayachi about Boxxo. The two have to end their conversation so they can stop the monsters from reaching the fortified city. Meanwhile, the Bearcats come across a field of crops outside the city; tastes of the fruits and vegetables having a familiar feeling to them. Back at the remains of the dungeon, Lammis desperately works with the others to try and find Boxxo. Hulemy uses a special device to locate Boxxo's whereabouts. In the city, Director Bear's group meet Jessica, the city's ruler, whose charm influences men. Director Bear tells Jessica about the Netherlord's scheme, and Jessica orders her butler Steck to deliver a message so the Guardian will come back and her maid Moeder to warn the soldiers. The group then enjoy a meal, made from similar vegetables and fruits from the field of crops. Back at camp, Kerioyl's group fight off invading monsters, but are confronted by Kayolings, who uses the monster corpses to create a gigantic monster. Kai reveals his vampire side and weakens Kayolings using his Blessing of Decay, which he got from the Dungeon Master after his curse was removed, allowing his family to kill her. The dungeon's other former inhabitants establish a new village.
33	9	"The Thumb General"; Transliteration: "Oya Shōgun" (Japanese: 親将軍)	Tatsuya Fujinaka	Yutaka Yasunaga	Warurō Suzuki	May 27, 2026
It is revealed that after suffering terrible damage from the Netherlord's attacks, Boxxo used his remaining points to repair himself and create some balloons and a lighter before changing to a small diorama-sized vending machine and then using the balloons and lighter to trigger an explosion that propels himself away and fake his death. He then turns himself invisible to trick the Netherlord into thinking that he was destroyed and witnesses the Netherlord fusing the stratum bosses together, plotting to use the monster to attack the Demon Lord. Boxxo had also entombed himself using his telekinesis, forcefield, and concrete blocks before the dungeon was destroyed. Lammis and the others eventually find Boxxo and lift him out. They bring him to the new village where he provides food for everyone. The team then resume their mission. They meet a strange woman with dark eyes, who turns out to be the Netherlord's mother; the Netherlord's real name is revealed to be Ribby. She then reveals her true dark skeletal form, also revealing that the Netherlord had experimented on her and that she is the Netherlord's Thumb General. She intends to stop them from interfering with her son's plans and summons John, her pet monster. Shimelai, Yumite, Hoxie, and the Directors fight the general and John. Boxxo uses fireworks to distract the general, and gives Lammis concrete blocks that she throws, with Boxxo riding on one of the blocks in his cardboard vending machine form. He then turns into his air machine form and smashes the general. With the general dead, John returns to where he originally came from. Boxxo takes on a new vehicle vending machine form and provides a pickup truck for everyone to use. He later provides them with pizza and udon noodles for lunch with two new forms. Boxxo still needs a way to deal with the Netherlord, though he is bothered by Shui's monstrous appetite. After a few days, the team finds and rescue Kerioyl's group from monsters and join the battle, eventually slaying all the monsters.
34	10	"I Am a Field Without Equal"; Transliteration: "Ore wa Hata de Musō Suru" (Japanese: 俺は畑で無双する)	Hodaka Kuromoto	Yutaka Yasunaga	Takashi Yamamoto	June 3, 2026
After being revived by Kikoyu and her animal companions, Field (whose original name is revealed to be Noko Hatake) is on his way to the Demon Lord’s castle. It turns out Field went into stasis following his battle against the Demon Lord’s original left leg general. Qyoehkotek, the new left leg general, was taking care of him and harvesting his crops for the time being. Aside from Kikoyu and her animal companions, he is also friends with Qyoehkotek, Hayachi, Jessica, the essigs, Steck, and Moeder. In the past, the Demon Lord tried to take over the fortified city due to how poor his lands are, but thanks to Field giving him crops, the Demon Lord had made peace and is now friends with Field. Kikoyu tells Field about Boxxo and the Netherlord’s scheme. Field has a meeting with the Demon Lord and his right arm general, who are grateful for Field for giving them crops, which persuaded them to stop attacking the fortified city. Two of the essigs arrive to inform them of the Netherlord’s betrayal. The Demon Lord sends Field and his allies to deal with him while Field sends Kuroyata to deliver a message. Field, Kikoyu, and Qyoehkotek go to the fortified city to meet Jessica; Field is the Guardian that Jessica and Hayachi mentioned. Jessica has a crush on Field, making Kikoyu and Qyoehkotek jealous as they too have feelings for him. They begin the war council. Meanwhile, Boxxo’s group have set up camp. As Hulemy attaches a cart to the back of the pickup truck, Boxxo gives her rain gear when it begins to rain. After building shelter for the hunters, the group drive off to the Murderous Forest on the truck and cart, but find the forest burnt down. They meet Mishuel, Hayachi, and the other two essigs. It turns out they burned the forest down to slow the Netherlord’s army. Due to more people in the group, Boxxo provides them with a second pickup truck. They learn that the Netherlord was the original ruler of the demon realm, but was forced out of his position by the Demon Lord. Kuroyata arrives with Field’s message, requesting their help in defeating the Netherlord and is also interested in meeting Boxxo. They send Kuroyata to deliver their own message. Boxxo is happy to get to meet Field, but the others sense this. The group continue their goal to defeat the Netherlord.
35	11	"To the Final Showdown"; Transliteration: "Saishū Kessen e" (Japanese: 最終決戦へ)	Masateru Nōmi	Shōta Gotō	Kōichi Okizaki & Naotaka Hayashi	June 17, 2026
The group set up camp while preparing for the battle against the Netherlord. Botan arrives to drop off Director Bear and Hevee, who are joining them. Meanwhile, Field's group also prepares for battle. Field springs pitfalls to turn the monsters into nutrients and fights the fused stratum lord head on while Boxxo's group watch from a distance before proceeding to fight some monsters. Kerioyl's family, Hayachi, and the essigs stay behind to help Field's group while the others confront the Netherlord, who is very pissed by their disruptions. He sacrifices some of his monsters to revive Kayolings, the Thumb General, and the Forefinger General. Director Bear and some of the hunters stay behind to fight them while the others go to fight the Netherlord. The Netherlord creates a black hole that leads to the spirit world. Their truck gets sucked into the black hole and Boxxo protects everyone with his barrier and takes on his vehicle vending machine to resist the pull while using concrete slabs to make himself heavier, but this proves ineffective as they are all sucked into the spirit world, with the Netherlord following them with the intent of destroying Boxxo. There is also a portal nearby that can return them to the real world, but it is suspected to be a lie, which the Netherlord denies as he has never lied. However, instead of using dirty tricks, the Netherlord decides to fight them head on. Back in the real world, Field manages to defeat the fused stratum lord, only for it to revive as the Netherlord must be defeated in order for the monster to die.
36	12	"Dreamworld"; Transliteration: "Dorīmuwārudo" (Japanese: ドリームワールド)	Takamigi Nose	Tatsuya Fujinaka	Takashi Yamamoto & Warurō Suzuki	June 24, 2026
The team fight the Netherlord, but can't break through his barrier. Boxxo turns into a holy water vending machine, which is able to break through the barrier. The Netherlord traps everyone, but Boxxo frees Lammis with his barrier. The two fight the Netherlord one on one. Using the treasures that he got from the Dungeon Master, Boxxo gains the transform skill that allows him to combine all the functions of his forms, which are able to neutralize the Netherlord's attacks and barrier. Boxxo is also able to speak clearly when using this transform ability. The Netherlord then takes on a much stronger form, but Boxxo creates multiple barriers to counter the Netherlord's attacks. Revealing transform's secondary's function, Boxxo takes on all of his vending machine forms at the same time, but it will only last for 30 minutes and will render him unable to take his other forms for a whole day once done. Boxxo calls this skill Dreamworld. The Netherlord is defeated and tries to escape, but is stopped and destroyed by Boxxo and Lammis for good (this also seemly destroys the Netherlord's generals and the merged stratum lord) just before Dreamworld's time limit runs out. The team are unable to use the portal to return to the real world due to the Netherlord using so much magic to empower himself, but the Demon Lord arrives to help them get back; invertedly revealing he knows what a vending machine is, making Boxxo realize that he too could be another reincarnated human from his world. At the fortified city, everyone welcomes the team home. Director Bear deems them honorary Clearflow Lake hunters. The former dungeon inhabitants build a new home in the fortified city and Boxxo has a conversation with Field, who gets a little jealous when Shirley, Director Origin, and two other women interact with Boxxo. The two hoped to one day become human again before Lammis and Kikoyu find them, with Kikoyu growing jealous of Field's interaction with Shirley and Director Origin. After kissing Boxxo, Lammis expresses her feelings for Boxxo despite being interrupted by the Bearcats. Everyone celebrates with a feast. Further in the future, a man tells two children about Boxxo before giving them drinks. Lammis and her team arrive to pick him up so they can start exploring a new dungeon. The man reveals that he is actually Boxxo, who has gained the ability to turn into a human.
