= 7-nin no Nemuri Hime =

Japanese manga series

- First tankōbon volume cover, featuring (clockwise from bottom) Clair, Elisa, Yuka, Chiara, Flora, Mia, and Charlotte

7人の眠り姫 (Shichinin no Nemuri Hime)
- Genre: Fantasy; Romantic comedy
- Manga
- Written by: Fiok Lee
- Published by: Kodansha
- Imprint: Afternoon KC
- Magazine: Monthly Afternoon
- Original run: March 25, 2023 – present
- Volumes: 13
- Anime television series
- Directed by: Mankyū
- Written by: Keiichirō Ōchi
- Studio: Studio Gokumi; AXsiZ Smash
- Original run: 2027 – scheduled
- icon

7-nin no Nemuri Hime (Japanese: 7人の眠り姫, Hepburn: Shichinin no Nemuri Hime; lit. 'Seven Sleeping Beauties') is a Japanese manga series written and illustrated by Fiok Lee. It has been serialized in Kodansha's seinen manga magazine Monthly Afternoon since March 2023. An anime television series adaptation produced by Studio Gokumi and AXsiZ Smash is set to premiere in 2027.

== Plot ==
Over thirty years after a witch has cursed the Kingdom of Amaryllis with a sleeping spell, a wandering prince named Alec sets off to the kingdom to save its people. To do this, he must slay the dragon protecting the kingdom's castle, climb the castle tower to enter the princess's chamber, then kiss the sleeping princess to wake her and finally break the curse.

Unfortunately for him, Alec discovers there are actually seven princesses to kiss, and, after having done that, the rest of the kingdom's people still have not awakened. Now, he must take responsibility by living with the princesses while they try to figure out how to break the curse once and for all.

== Characters ==
Alec (アレク, Areku)
The Third Prince of the nearby Kingdom of Rudbeckia. He is 21 years old.
Clair (クレア, Kurea)
Voiced by: Miku Itō
The Third Princess of the Kingdom of Amaryllis. She is 21 years old.
Chiara (キアラ, Kiara)
Voiced by: Yoshino Aoyama
The Second Princess of the Kingdom of Amaryllis. She is 22 years old.
Flora (フローラ, Furōra)
Voiced by: Aya Yamane
The First Princess of the Kingdom of Amaryllis. She is 23 years old.
Elisa (エリザ, Eriza)
Voiced by: Rina Kawaguchi
The Seventh Princess of the Kingdom of Amaryllis. She is 18 years old.
Yuka (ユーカ, Yūka)
Voiced by: Fūka Izumi
The Sixth Princess of the Kingdom of Amaryllis. She is 18 years old.
Charlotte (シャルロッテ, Sharurotte)
Voiced by: Kana Ichinose
The Fifth Princess of the Kingdom of Amaryllis. She is 19 years old.
Mia (ミア)
Voiced by: Ayasa Itō
The Fourth Princess of the Kingdom of Amaryllis. She is 20 years old.

== Media ==
=== Manga ===
Written and illustrated by Fiok Lee, 7-nin no Nemuri Hime began serialization in Kodansha's seinen manga magazine Monthly Afternoon on March 25, 2023. Kodansha has collected its chapters into individual tankōbon volumes. The first volume was released on August 23, 2023. As of November 17, 2026, thirteen volumes have been released.

==== Volumes ====
| No. | Release date | ISBN |
|---|---|---|
| 1 | August 23, 2023 | 978-4-06-532628-2 |
| 2 | October 23, 2023 | 978-4-06-533331-0 |
| 3 | December 21, 2023 | 978-4-06-533861-2 |
| 4 | March 15, 2024 | 978-4-06-534836-9 |
| 5 | July 17, 2024 | 978-4-06-535980-8 |
| 6 | November 15, 2024 | 978-4-06-537462-7 |
| 7 | February 17, 2025 | 978-4-06-538632-3 |
| 8 | May 16, 2025 | 978-4-06-539469-4 |
| 9 | September 17, 2025 | 978-4-06-540580-2 |
| 10 | January 16, 2026 | 978-4-06-542175-8 |
| 11 | April 16, 2026 | 978-4-06-543257-0 |
| 12 | July 16, 2026 | 978-4-06-544234-0 |
| 13 | November 17, 2026 | 978-4-06-545688-0 |

=== Anime ===
An anime television series adaptation was announced on July 7, 2026. It will be produced by Studio Gokumi and AXsiZ Smash and directed by Mankyū, with series composition and screenplays handled by Keiichirō Ōchi and characters designed by Masaru Koseki. The series is set to premiere in 2027.
