= I Got Married to the Girl I Hate Most in Class =

Japanese light novel series

- First light novel volume cover, featuring Akane Sakuramori

クラスの大嫌いな女子と結婚することになった。 (Kurasu no Dai-kirai na Joshi to Kekkon Suru Koto ni Natta)
- Genre: Romantic comedy
- Light novel
- Written by: Seiju Amano
- Illustrated by: Nanami Narumi
- Published by: Media Factory
- English publisher: NA: Seven Seas Entertainment
- Imprint: MF Bunko J
- Original run: December 25, 2020 – January 24, 2025
- Volumes: 10
- Manga
- Written by: Seiju Amano
- Illustrated by: Mosskonbu
- Published by: Kadokawa Shoten
- English publisher: NA: Seven Seas Entertainment
- Magazine: Shōnen Ace Plus
- Original run: May 14, 2021 – present
- Volumes: 10
- Anime television series

I'm Getting Married to a Girl I Hate in My Class
- Directed by: Hiroyuki Oshima
- Written by: Tatsuya Takahashi
- Music by: Alisa Okehazama
- Studio: Studio Gokumi; AXsiZ
- Licensed by: Crunchyroll (streaming): SEA: Plus Media Networks Asia
- Original network: Tokyo MX, GYT, GTV, BS11, MBS, TVA, AT-X
- Original run: January 3, 2025 – March 21, 2025
- Episodes: 12
- icon

I Got Married to the Girl I Hate Most in Class (Note: Japanese: クラスの大嫌いな女子と結婚することになった。, Hepburn: Kurasu no Dai Kirai na Joshi to Kekkon suru Koto ni Natta) or KuraKon (Note: Japanese: クラコン) is a Japanese romantic comedy light novel series written by Seiju Amano and illustrated by Nanami Narumi. Originally launched as a YouTube manga on the Manga Angel Neko Oka channel in March 2020, Media Factory have published ten volumes from December 2020 to January 2025 under their MF Bunko J imprint. A manga adaptation with art by Mosskonbu has been serialized online via Kadokawa Shoten's Shōnen Ace Plus website since May 2021 and has been collected in ten tankōbon volumes. An anime television series adaptation produced by Studio Gokumi and AXsiZ aired from January to March 2025.

== Plot ==
Saito Hōjō, the heir to a large corporation, and Akane Sakuramori, a student with a tsundere personality, are two classmates notorious for their poor in-class relationship, with the two frequently fighting in class. One day, the two are summoned to a meeting by their respective grandparents, who have arranged for the two to get married and live together. Saito and Akane's grandparents once loved each other but went their separate ways, and thus want to see their grandchildren fulfill the relationship they never had. However, with the relationship being a requirement for Saito to one day inherit the company, the two reluctantly agree. Saito and Akane now have to deal with living together and their secret relationship, with their on-campus hostility.

== Characters ==
Saito Hōjō (北条 才人, Hōjō Saito)
Voiced by: Shogo Sakata
Akane's classmate. He despises her with a burning passion, but much to his horror, he is placed into an arranged marriage with her against his will. Though they initially fight during their first few days of being married, over the course of the story, Saito bonds with Akane and starts to realize he is actually in love with her. He is also aware of Himari being in love with him as well, but doesn't reciprocate her feelings and is constantly annoyed by her affections. His family owns a large conglomerate. His grandfather was originally in love with Akane's grandmother but forced to marry someone else. He resumed his relationship with her grandmother after his wife's death. Saito eventually rejects Himari and Maho, and marries Akane for real.
Akane Sakuramori (桜森 朱音, Sakuramori Akane)
Voiced by: Hinaki Yano
Saito's classmate, who has a tsundere personality. Despite being popular and known for her good looks, she has a quiet personality in class and hates Saito with a burning passion. She constantly bothers and annoys Saito out of spite, which often puts them both at odds with each other; however throughout the course of the story, she warms up to Saito and realizes she actually is in love with him as well. She briefly met Saito during a party when they were children and was excited to find out they were classmates in high school, only to be disappointed when he does not recognize her. She aims to become a doctor, having been influenced by her younger sister Maho's health issues when they were younger.
Himari Ishikura (石倉 陽鞠, Ishikura Himari)
Voiced by: Sayumi Suzushiro
Akane and Saito's classmate who is a popular gyaru with a kind personality. She is Akane's childhood friend, and has been head over heels in love with Saito since their first year in highschool, even though he never reciprocated. She was initially unaware of Akane and Saito's forced marriage, but once she finds out the truth and realizes Akane has been lying to her, their relationship begins to deteriorate and Himari doubles down on her efforts to have Saito all for herself to spite Akane, leading to both girls turning on each other and forming a heated rivalry, much to Saito's frustration. Her mother died when she was young and her father later remarried, contributing to her personality.
Shisei Hōjō (北条 糸青, Hōjō Shisei)
Voiced by: Nene Hieda
Akane and Saito's classmate, and Saito's younger cousin. She has a close bond with Saito, having spent her early childhood living with him, and often gives him advice on how to be nicer to Akane after discovering their forced marriage. Though initially reluctant, she eventually warms up to Akane as well. Later on, she almost marries Saito after his engagement to Akane is called off, but in the end, this does not push through.
Tenryu Hōjō (北条 天竜, Hōjō Tenryu)
Voiced by: Hōchū Ōtsuka
Saito's grandfather. Tenryu had a mutual attraction to Chiyo in their youth, but they never acted on it. To this end, they force their grandchildren to get married as their proxies.
Chiyo Sakuramori (桜森 千代, Sakuramori Chiyo)
Voiced by: Fumi Hirano
Akane's grandmother, who joins Tenryu's scheme to marry their grandchildren and rekindle their own relationship.
Maho Sakuramori (桜森 真帆, Sakuramori Maho)
Voiced by: Kaori Maeda
A young underclasswoman and Akane's little sister, who recently transferred to their school. Since she enjoys stalking Akane, she pretends to be romantically interested in Saito, in order to follow him to their house and discover their marriage. She was sickly when she was younger, which inspired Akane's dream of becoming a doctor. She later manipulates Tenryu and Chiyo to make her Saito's fiancée instead of Akane, only for this to fall through and for Akane and Saito to marry for real.

== Media ==
=== Light novels ===
Written by Seiju Amano and illustrated by Nanami Narumi, I Got Married to the Girl I Hate Most in Class was published in ten volumes under Media Factory's MF Bunko J light novel imprint on December 25, 2020, to January 24, 2025. The series is licensed in North America by Seven Seas Entertainment.

No.	Original release date	Original ISBN	English release date	English ISBN
1	December 25, 2020	978-4-04-065939-8	December 2, 2025	979-8-89561-761-8
2	April 25, 2021	978-4-04-680332-0	March 17, 2026	979-8-89561-762-5
3	August 25, 2021	978-4-04-680702-1	July 14, 2026	979-8-89561-763-2
4	December 25, 2021	978-4-04-681000-7	November 3, 2026	979-8-89561-764-9
5	May 25, 2022	978-4-04-681409-8	—	—
6	October 25, 2022	978-4-04-681834-8	—	—
7	February 25, 2023	978-4-04-682206-2	—	—
8	November 25, 2023	978-4-04-682986-3	—	—
9	August 23, 2024	978-4-04-683913-8	—	—
10	January 24, 2025	978-4-04-684445-3	—	—

=== Manga ===
A manga adaptation with art by Mosskonbu began serialization on Kadokawa Shoten's Shōnen Ace Plus manga website on May 14, 2021. The manga's chapters have been compiled into ten tankōbon volumes as of October 2026. The manga adaptation is also licensed in North America by Seven Seas Entertainment.

No.	Original release date	Original ISBN	English release date	English ISBN
1	December 25, 2021	978-4-04-112023-1	March 4, 2025	978-1-64827-362-9
2	May 25, 2022	978-4-04-112639-4	June 3, 2025	979-8-89373-143-9
3	December 26, 2022	978-4-04-113174-9	September 2, 2025	979-8-89373-354-9
4	July 25, 2023	978-4-04-113915-8	December 2, 2025	979-8-89373-355-6
5	February 26, 2024	978-4-04-114664-4	March 3, 2026	979-8-89373-634-2
6	September 25, 2024	978-4-04-115387-1	June 2, 2026	979-8-89561-091-6
7	March 24, 2025	978-4-04-116056-5	September 1, 2026	979-8-89765-117-7
8	September 26, 2025	978-4-04-116692-5	December 15, 2026	979-8-89765-987-6
9	April 24, 2026	978-4-04-117384-8	—	—
10	October 23, 2026	978-4-04-117768-6	—	—

=== Anime ===
An anime television series adaptation was announced on June 24, 2024. It is produced by Aniplex, animated by Studio Gokumi and AXsiZ, and directed by Hiroyuki Oshima, with Tatsuya Takahashi writing series scripts, Nanako Tatsu designing the characters, and Arisa Okehazama composing the music. The series aired from January 3 to March 21, 2025, on Tokyo MX and other networks. The opening theme song is "Koibito Ijō, Suki Miman" (恋人以上、好き未満; lit. 'More Than Lovers, Less Than Love'), performed by =Love, while the ending theme song is "Suki Kirai mo Oikoshite" (スキキライも追い越して; lit. "Overtaking Love and Hate"), performed by Hinaki Yano, Sayumi Suzushiro and Nene Hieda as their respective characters. Crunchyroll streamed the series under the title I'm Getting Married to a Girl I Hate in My Class. Plus Media Networks Asia licensed the series in Southeast Asia and broadcasts it on Aniplus Asia.

==== Episodes ====
No.	Title	Directed by	Written by	Storyboarded by	Original release date
1	"I'm Getting Married to a Girl I Hate in My Class"; Transliteration: "Dai-kirai na Joshi to Kekkon Shita." (Japanese: 大嫌いな女子と結婚した。)	Yukio Kuroda	Tatsuya Takahashi	Hiroyuki Ōshima	January 3, 2025
Saito and Akane are classmates who hate each other. Saito is summoned by his grandfather Tenryu, owner of a worldwide conglomerate, to a meeting with Akane and her grandmother Chiyo. Tenryu and Chiyo explain they were childhood sweethearts who separated and married other people. Now they are curious what might have happened if they stayed together. Therefore, they have decided to recreate their childhood love by forcing Saito and Akane to marry; if they refuse Saito will be removed as Tenryu’s heir whilst Chiyo makes a silent threat to Akane. After three days of deliberating, they both decide it is in their best interest to marry. Tenryu and Chiyo quickly have their marriage license submitted and buy them a house before they can change their minds. They also warn them to share a bed or face the consequences they mentioned earlier. Despite either arguing or avoiding each other, they eventually go to bed. Saito is curious what it was Chiyo said to force Akane to marry him, but Akane refuses to explain. Akane then punishes Saito when he accidentally touches her butt in bed. The one thing they agree on is they must absolutely keep their situation a secret from everyone at school, to avoid controversy.
2	"A New Life"; Transliteration: "Shin-seikatsu" (Japanese: 新生活)	Hodaka Kuramoto	Tatsuya Takahashi	Hiroyuki Ōshima	January 10, 2025
At school, Saito's cousin Shise deduces Saito agreed to Tenryu's demand and married Akane. Disliking this, she demands a bribe to keep their secret. Akane is disgusted Saito's diet consists entirely of ramen, protein shakes and vitamin supplements. Cooking for him, Saito finds real food reminds him of his parents neglect and Tenryu's lavish business dinners. They continue to disagree on every aspect of living together, from cooking to cleaning, studying and gaming. Stressed, Saito tries to take a bath but accidentally walks in on Akane already bathing. When she doesn't react he realizes she is asleep. Fearing she may drown, he panics and pulls her out. At first she is furious, but eventually realizes he was only trying to help. She asks her friend Himari how she can stop fighting with Saito. Himari suggests they learn to respect and listen to each other. In a similar conversation, Shise advises Saito to learn how to compromise. Though doubtful, both Saito and Akane give it a try. Realizing they can't afford to divorce, Akane and Saito have an honest conversation and set out strict ground rules for how they interact at home and share chores. Amazingly, they manage to last all day without a single fight, which helps them realize they might not actually hate each other as much as they thought. Saito feels his heart beat faster when he sees Akane smiling warmly, and to his embarrassment, realizes she truly is beautiful.
3	"My Wife"; Transliteration: "Ore no Yome" (Japanese: 俺の嫁)	Tatsuya Fujinaka	Tetsuya Yamada	Royden B	January 17, 2025
After watching movies and playing games, Saito finds he enjoys spending time with Akane. Himari notices they barely fight anymore, even though they desperately try to convince her nothing has changed between them. Saito studies books on improving communication then asks Akane to go shopping. Akane panics that it might be a date, but an embarrassed Saito tries to reassure her they're only going out to buy necessities. Akane shows Saito how to be a smart shopper. Saito claims she will be a good wife one day, before remembering they are already married. That night Akane hugs him in her sleep, though he admits he found it cute but this only makes sharing a bed awkward. The next morning, Himari sees them walking to school together. With an exam approaching, Akane goes overboard with studying and catches a cold. Half asleep, she admits to Saito Chiyo promised to fund her education to become a doctor, but only if she married Saito; otherwise, she would never be able to fulfill her life-long dream. She also admits to admiring Saito, who gets perfect exam scores without studying, even if it often leaves her jealous and frustrated. Her fever worsens, so a worried Saito carries her all the way to the hospital, hoping for their marriage to possibly work out in the end. Akane recovers and Saito now finds he enjoys their arguments as he playfully annoys her. Himari jokingly flirts with Saito, causing Akane to jealously remind Saito he is married. Saito suspects he might just have the cutest wife in the world, as he realizes his feelings for Akane are much more genuine than he originally thought.
4	"Night Attack"; Transliteration: "Yashū" (Japanese: 夜襲)	Masateru Nōmi	Tetsuya Yamada	Hiroako Ōshima	January 24, 2025
Akane starts making boxed lunches for Saito. Himari notices their lunches are identical, making their classmates suspicious. Himari asks Saito if he is dating Akane, but seems unconvinced when he denies it. Akane starts seeing a ghost around the house so she starts following Saito everywhere and even asks him to stand guard outside while she bathes. Shise comforts them, telling them she knows that they are in a fake marriage and decides to visit their house to exorcise the ghost. After snooping through Saito’s underwear and books looking for porn Shise deduces the ghost is none other than herself, having been breaking into their house hoping to spy on them having sex. Despite her guilt, Shise ends up staying the night. Akane notices Saito and Shise seem closer than normal cousins, uncomfortably so. In bed, Akane tries to talk to Saito about babying Shise too much, but is unable to bring herself to admit she's jealous, much to his confusion. They realize Shise snuck into their bed while they were arguing. Akane worries Shise might never stop interfering in their lives. After Saito falls asleep, Shise tells Akane it is obvious she is jealous of her. She also points out Saito is very dense and will never figure out how Akane feels unless she tells him directly. Akane denies feeling anything, but Shise feels better knowing Saito’s future as a married man will be happy.
5	"I Won't Lose"; Transliteration: "Makenai kara" (Japanese: 負けないから)	Hiroyuki Ōshima	Tetsuya Yamada	Shinji Tanabe & Hiroyuki Ōshima	January 31, 2025
Himari surprises Akane by admitting she is in love with Saito and wants her help to win his heart; she first fell in love with him back in their first year of high school, though he never noticed her true feelings and has never reciprocated. Feeling pressured, Akane begins passing Himari unflattering details about Saito, hoping to put her off, such as his preference for rare steak and horror games. Unfortunately, this only makes Himari more interested in Saito. Akane worries when Himari and Saito actually start to become friendly. Himari is pleased with her progress and asks to visit Akane’s house to celebrate. Akane accidentally agrees and Saito is forced to hide. Himari reveals she plans to ask Saito on a date as long as Akane isn’t interested in him. Akane denies this and insults Saito, only this time Saito’s feelings seem genuinely hurt. The next day, Himari asks Saito on a date. Saito gives Akane several opportunities to stop him, but she stubbornly tells him to go. At the last second, she stops him and admits to her jealousy since he is her husband and no one else’s. Saito reveals he already rejected Himari and used the opportunity to get Akane to admit her real feelings. Despite her outrage at being deceived, Saito takes Akane shopping and even offers to buy her a wedding ring, which she angrily refuses. Himari recovers quickly and is determined to change Saito’s mind so she can confess again. Shise tells her she won't let Himari have Saito. Akane is also determined not to let Himari win, but gets confused when she says that.
6	"Newlywed's First Date"; Transliteration: "Fūfu no Hatsu-dēto" (Japanese: 夫婦の初デート)	Yukio Kuroda	Tatsuya Takahashi	Royden B	February 7, 2025
Himari asks Saito to tutor her, but when Akane and Shise protest she simply invites them as well. During the session Akane is once again struck by Saito's perfect memory. Saito reveals every member of his family actually has an impressive ability. Shise directs Himari to the bathroom, leaving Akane and Saito alone. She angrily accuses him of never offering to tutor her. Saito admits he doesn't mind her annoying personality, and in fact respects her for how she cares for others. Saito begins tutoring Akane at home and asks her about her goal to be a doctor. Akane admits she has a younger sister who suffered from a bad illness. For days afterwards Akane appears upset so Saito asks Shise for advice. Shise advises he take Akane shopping. Saito invites Akane to shop for limited edition sweets she likes. Akane panics but agrees to go. Chiyo is thrilled and forces her to wear a stylish dress, though both Akane and Saito insist it is not a date. After karaoke and drinking lemonade Saito admits he felt guilty for reminding Akane of her sister and was trying to cheer her up. On the way home Akane spots a ring in a jewellers but refuses to let Saito buy it, but she does thank him for cheering her up. In a memory of her mother it is shown Akane views rings as symbols of true love.
7	"The Ring"; Transliteration: "Yubiwa" (Japanese: 指輪)	Kiyotaka Takezawa	Tatsuya Takahashi	Hiroyuki Ōshima	February 14, 2025
Saito asks Shise’s mother, his aunt Reiko, if he can work for her temporarily. Despite Reiko's disappointment Saito won’t be marrying Shise she agrees. Shise is jealous he is buying a gift for Akane and clings to him even whilst he is working. Akane notices Saito coming home late smelling of Shise’s perfume. She calls the Hojo estate to check on Saito but is aggressively warned by Reiko their marriage is a formality, so it is none of her business. Upset, she accuses Saito of cheating with Shise, only for Saito to reveal he needed money to buy the ring she liked. Akane wears the ring on her right hand and one day accidentally wears it to school, so she hides it in her purse. Returning home she realises her purse is missing. She considers buying a replacement so Saito won’t realise, but can’t as it wouldn’t be the ring Saito bought for her. She spends days looking everywhere and eventually Saito notices her odd behaviour. At Shise’s suggestion he follows Akane and deduces she lost the ring. With his perfect memory he recalls everywhere they went the day she lost the ring and locates her wallet in a drain. Akane is euphoric and Saito puts the ring on her left hand. Despite the left hand meaning deep love in marriage Akane decides to wear it there anyway. Meanwhile, a troublesome girl arrives with plans for Akane and Saito.
8	"Senpai"; Transliteration: "Senpai" (Japanese: センパイ)	Hiroyuki Ōshima & Tatsuya Fujinaka	Tetsuya Yamada	Waruo Suzuki	February 21, 2025
A girl named Maho approaches Saito and threatens to tell everyone he lives with Akane unless he becomes her boyfriend. She attempts to kiss him, but Shise rescues him. Instead, Maho drags him to get burgers. She admits she loves junk food but her family scold her unhealthy habits. Maho cannot understand Saito's loyalty to Akane when by his own admission she is his nemesis. She blackmails him into letting her visit his house, where Akane reveals Maho is her younger sister who was sick as a child and is now spoiled by their family. Maho beats up Saito after finding out they share a bed and insists on staying the night. In private, Maho offers to convince their grandmother to let her marry Saito instead, freeing Akane from the responsibility. She also points out the things Akane dislikes about Saito she actually enjoys, like junk food and video games. The idea makes Akane uncomfortable for reasons she can't understand. Maho ambushes Saito in the bath and makes him the same offer of marriage. Exhausted by her behavior Saito goes to bed, where Akane asks him if he wants to divorce her. Saito wonders if it is actually Akane that wants to divorce, then realizes he doesn't even know what he wants himself.
9	"Little Sister's Heartache"; Transliteration: "Imōto-gokoro" (Japanese: 妹心)	Hodaka Kuramoto	Tetsuya Yamada	Hiroyuki Ōshima	February 28, 2025
Saito is ambushed by Maho intent on seducing him. This reminds him of a girl he really liked that he met at one of Tenryu's parties. Maho claims she was the girl, proving they should get married. Saito sees through her lie and accuses her of hating him. Maho admits this just before Akane walks in and throws them both out. Maho becomes sick with Saito realizing she left her medication behind. Maho insists Saito not tell Akane as she still feels guilty Akane had to look after her as children. The next day, Akane demands to know where Maho is, but he refuses to say. Secretly, Akane wants him to come home. In hospital, Maho reveals she travels and has as much fun as possible in preparation for a future where she might be bedridden permanently. It also provides Akane a chance to live life without her. Saito realizes she only tried to seduce him because she thought Akane was unhappy being married to him and was actually upset when Akane said she hated her. Saito admits he wants Akane to be happy too. Eavesdropping outside, Akane is confused why Saito would care about her being happy. A week later Maho recovers and admits everything to Akane. She also admits she might have fallen in love with Saito for real. Akane demands to know if he was serious about making her happy, and when he begrudgingly admits it she demands he move back home. Listening nearby, Himari finally learns Saito and Akane are living together.
10	"Girlfriend (Tentative)"; Transliteration: "Kanojo (Kari)" (Japanese: 彼女（仮）)	Yukio Kuroda	Tatsuya Takahashi	Royden B	March 7, 2025
Himari blurts out the truth in front of the class. The rumour spreads fast and soon classmates are even following Saito after school, hoping for a photo of him and Akane at the same house. After evading them, Maho visits with Himari, who apologizes for exposing their secret. They also apologize for lying to her. Aware they are in a loveless marriage, Himari cheers up, believing she still has a chance with Saito, though she fails to realize how uncomfortable Saito is around her. To dispel the rumours, they pretend Saito is dating Himari, though Akane warns him if anything happens he will face consequences. Himari enjoys herself enormously, but Saito and Akane are uneasy all day. Himari successfully starts a rumour about Saito reciprocating her feelings, though in reality, Saito becomes even more disturbed. Akane is unhappy with the situation, but is unable to do anything about it, as Himari insists they need to do more. Next they go on an after school date in public, ending with Himari asking Saito to visit her home. From her bookcase, Saito deduces Himari is smarter than she acts and studies psychology in her spare time. Himari offers to be his mistress, since Akane is legally his wife, but he refuses, subtly hinting at the fact that he doesn't love her at all, but Himari remains oblivious. Himari asks him to stay late since she is lonely, and even though he doesn't want to, he still agrees and ends up returning to Akane much later than planned. Akane tries to ask Himari to stop, but when she asks if she likes Saito, Akane still stubbornly refuses to admit it, as she doesn't want to tarnish her public image at school. Himari sees no problem with continuing to act as Saito's girlfriend forever if she doesn't having feelings for Saito. Akane reluctantly agrees with her, but she feels the pain in her heart once more.
11	"Voice"; Transliteration: "Koe" (Japanese: 声)	Hiroyuki Ōshima	Tatsuya Takahashi	Hiroyuki Ōshima	March 14, 2025
Saito and Akane finally exchange phone numbers to coordinate hiding from their classmates. Saito asks Maho about the girl from Tenryu's party. Shise drags Maho away before she can answer. Tenryu informs Saito he must attend Tenryu's cousin Shizu's 70th birthday, reminding Saito as his heir he will need Shizu's support. Akane refuses to attend as she fears meeting his family, especially Reiko. Shizu decides Tenryu did the right thing since the Sakuramori's are equal to the Hojo's in political power, making Akane an ideal wife. Akane invites Himari, who is glad Akane isn’t mad at her. Akane is jealous Himari has had Saito’s phone number for a long time and has been sending him erotic selfies. Himari points out hate isn’t the opposite of love, it is indifference, so Saito must care about her in order to argue with her. After Himari leaves, Akane struggles with loneliness. Saito receives a call from Akane who misses arguing with him and demands he come home as soon as possible. Saito is surprised Akane thinks of their house as "home". Akane is too scared to sleep alone and panics when a burglar tries to break in, only to find it is Saito who came home early since he missed arguing too. After an argument naturally breaks out they both feel better. As they go to bed Saito notices Akane chose to sleep pressed up against his back. He also realises her voice is the same as the girl from the party.
12	"I'm Getting Married to a Guy I Hate in My Class"; Transliteration: "Dai-kirai na Danshi to Kekkon Shita." (Japanese: 大嫌いな男子と結婚した。)	Hiroyuki Ōshima & Kiyotaka Takezawa	Tatsuya Takahashi	Hiroyuki Ōshima	March 21, 2025
Saito recalls meeting Akane on their first day of high school, and yet Akane greeted him with "long time, no see", suggesting they actually met earlier. Akane leaves upset; despite his perfect memory Saito somehow forgot she was the girl at Tenryu's party. While grocery shopping Saito encounters Himari who suddenly kisses him. Meanwhile, someone takes a photo of their kiss and shares it with their classmates. Akane is furious but Himari simply tells her she never made it secret she wants Saito for herself. Akane finally asks her to stop pretending to be Saito's boyfriend. Himari refuses unless Akane gives her a real reason why she should stop. Akane finally admits she is in love with Saito but Himari is unconvinced, pointing out Akane hated him since their first day of high school whereas she has loved him for all that time. Akane angrily reveals she has loved Saito since she was 12 at Tenryu's party. After a vicious argument Himari admits she always knew Akane was in love with Saito and though Himari could easily have made him fall in love with her she never did as it would have hurt Akane. Akane realises Himari's real goal was to help her realise she is in love with Saito. The two reconcile and agree to both try their hardest to win Saito for themselves. Saito is baffled: Akane is angrier than ever at him and Himari's failed attempts to seduce him have become more brazen, leaving him even more disgusted of her. He briefly considers rejecting both girls for his own good, but then Shise shocks everyone by claiming Himari wasn't Saito's first kiss. Saito tries to apologize for whatever he did to upset Akane, but Akane simply yells repeatedly that she hates him, leaving a frustrated Saito to question his sanity.

== Reception ==
It was reported in April 2026 that the series had over 720,000 copies in circulation.
