= Ms. Koizumi Loves Ramen Noodles =

Japanese manga series

- Cover of the first tankōbon volume, featuring Koizumi (center)

ラーメン大好き小泉さん (Rāmen Daisuki Koizumi-san)
- Genre: Comedy
- Manga
- Written by: Naru Narumi
- Published by: Takeshobo; (2013 – 2024); Akita Shoten; (2024 – present)
- English publisher: NA: Dark Horse Comics
- Imprint: Bamboo Comics; (2013 – 2024); Shōnen Champion Comics; (2024 – present)
- Magazine: Manga Life Storia; (September 30, 2013 – July 30, 2019); Storia Dash; (July 30, 2019 – February 23, 2024); Monthly Shōnen Champion; (October 4, 2024 – present)
- Original run: September 30, 2013 – present
- Volumes: 16
- Television drama
- Directed by: Tsukuru Matsuki
- Written by: Ayumu Kyūma; Kumiko Asō
- Studio: Kyodo Television
- Original network: Fuji TV
- Original run: June 27, 2015 – December 30, 2016
- Episodes: 6
- Anime television series
- Directed by: Kenji Seto
- Written by: Tatsuya Takahashi
- Music by: Takashi Tanaka; Shinichi Hosono
- Studio: Studio Gokumi; AXsiZ
- Licensed by: Crunchyroll (streaming); NA: Discotek Media (home video); SEA: Medialink
- Original network: AT-X, Tokyo MX, BS11, MBS
- Original run: January 4, 2018 – March 22, 2018
- Episodes: 12

Ms. Koizumi Loves Ramen Noodles (Japanese: ラーメン大好き小泉さん, Hepburn: Rāmen Daisuki Koizumi-san) is a Japanese manga series written by Naru Narumi. It began serialization in Takeshobo's Manga Life Storia magazine in September 2013. The series was later moved to Takeshobo's Storia Dash website in July 2019. The series was moved a third time, beginning serialization on Akita Shoten's Monthly Shōnen Champion magazine in October 2024. A live-action drama series adaptation aired from June 2015 to December 2016. A 12-episode anime television series adaptation co-animated by Studio Gokumi and AXsiZ aired in Japan from January to March 2018.

== Synopsis ==
Koizumi is worshipped in her class for her beauty, but she is mysterious, as she does not communicate with anyone of her own free will. But her partner Yuu wants to get to know her more, and she unexpectedly discovers Koizumi's great passion, ramen noodles. Both will tour the city to experience new flavors and try to forge a friendship.

== Characters ==
Koizumi (小泉)
Voiced by: Ayana Taketatsu
Played by: Akari Hayami (2015 version), Hiyori Sakurada (2020 version)
Koizumi is an enigmatic, beautiful girl with pale skin who has recently moved into the neighborhood. Appearing mostly cold and antisocial, the only time her facade is broken is when ramen is involved; either when she consumes it with ravenous delight (when they sport unusual flavors), or when she shares her extensive knowledge about types and ways of preparation, being a true ramen gourmet. She is fluent in German.
Yuu Ohsawa (大澤 悠, Ōsawa Yū)
Voiced by: Ayane Sakura
Played by: Karen Miyama (2015 version), Manami Igashira (2020 version)
Yuu is a cheerful and optimistic girl who has developed an obsession for her new classmate Koizumi. When she discovers Koizumi's passion for ramen, she attempts to use this to get closer to her. She is good at cooking and is a member of the home economics club.
Misa Nakamura (中村 美沙, Nakamura Misa)
Voiced by: Akari Kitō
Played by: Seika Furuhata (2015 version), Ririka Tanabe (2020 version)
Misa is Yuu's classmate, who initially becomes jealous of Yū's growing obsession for Koizumi. However, she is a lover of spicy foods, and she and Koizumi become sort-of-friends through this single common passion.
Jun Takahashi (高橋 潤, Takahashi Jun)
Voiced by: Yumi Hara (2015 version), Ayaka Imoto (2020 version)
Jun is the student representative of Koizumi, Yuu and Misa's class who is very fastidious about her status. While she likes ramen, she has ceased consuming it in public after her glasses once fogged up while she ate some in the school cafeteria, until Koizumi manages to rekindle that lost delight.
Shuu Ohsawa (大澤 修, Ōsawa Shū)
Voiced by: Yuichi Nakamura
Yuu's older brother, he is a college student who works at Izakaya. Like his sister, he becomes interested in Koizumi, but initially remains unaware of Yuu's passion for her.
Ayane Ohsawa (大澤 絢音, Ōsawa Ayane)
Voiced by: Kana Ueda
Yuu's older cousin who has been living in Osaka before recently moving to Tokyo.

== Media ==
=== Manga ===
Ms. Koizumi Loves Ramen Noodles is written and illustrated by Naru Narumi. It began serialization in Takeshobo's Manga Life Storia magazine on September 30, 2013. In 2019, after the disbandment of the magazine, the series was transferred to the Storia Dash website. In February 2024, the series stopped publication on Storia Dash, and resumed serialization in Akita Shoten's Monthly Shōnen Champion magazine in October 2024. Akita Shoten reprinted volumes one to eleven with expanded content. The series is licensed by Dark Horse Comics for release in North America starting in September 2019. The series is also published in Taiwan by Kadokawa Media. Takeshobo published an anthology titled Ms. Koizumi Loves Ramen Noodles Official Anthology (ラーメン大好き小泉さん公式アンソロジー) on January 30, 2018.

No.	Original release date	Original ISBN	English release date	English ISBN
1	October 7, 2014 (Takeshobo); October 8, 2024 (Akita Shoten)	978-4-81-248798-3; 978-4-253-29255-9	September 25, 2019	978-1-50-671327-4
2	February 14, 2015 (Takeshobo); October 8, 2024 (Akita Shoten)	978-4-80-195084-9; 978-4-253-29256-6	September 23, 2020	978-1-50-671328-1
3	October 7, 2015 (Takeshobo); October 8, 2024 (Akita Shoten)	978-4-80-195361-1; 978-4-253-29257-3	April 7, 2021	978-1-50-671329-8
4	June 17, 2016 (Takeshobo); October 8, 2024 (Akita Shoten)	978-4-80-195559-2; 978-4-253-29258-0	—	—
5	March 30, 2017 (Takeshobo); November 8, 2024 (Akita Shoten)	978-4-80-195797-8; 978-4-253-29259-7	—	—
6	January 30, 2018 (Takeshobo); November 8, 2024 (Akita Shoten)	978-4-80-196166-1; 978-4-253-29260-3	—	—
7	November 30, 2018 (Takeshobo); November 8, 2024 (Akita Shoten)	978-4-80-196453-2; 978-4-253-29711-0	—	—
8	September 30, 2019 (Takeshobo); November 8, 2024 (Akita Shoten)	978-4-80-196752-6; 978-4-253-29712-7	—	—
9	August 28, 2020 (Takeshobo); December 6, 2024 (Akita Shoten)	978-4-80-197041-0; 978-4-253-29713-4	—	—
10	September 30, 2021 (Takeshobo); December 6, 2024 (Akita Shoten)	978-4-80-197418-0; 978-4-253-29714-1	—	—
11	July 11, 2023 (Takeshobo); December 6, 2024 (Akita Shoten)	978-4-80-198090-7; 978-4-253-29715-8	—	—
12	December 6, 2024	978-4-253-29716-5; 978-4-253-29717-2 (SE)	—	—
13	April 8, 2025	978-4-253-29718-9	—	—
14	October 8, 2025	978-4-253-00434-3	—	—
15	May 8, 2026	978-4-253-01347-5	—	—
16	October 27, 2026	978-4-253-02018-3	—	—

=== Live-action drama ===
A four-episode live-action drama series, produced by Kyodo Television and directed by Tsukuru Matsuki, aired from June 27 to July 18, 2015, on Fuji TV. A New Year's special aired on January 4, 2016, and a New Year's Eve special aired on December 30, 2016. The show's theme song is "Ramen Daisuki Koizumi-san no Uta" (ラーメン大好き小泉さんの唄) by Magnolia Factory. A third special aired on March 27, 2020, and a fourth special aired on January 8, 2022.

=== Anime ===
A 12-episode anime television series adaptation, co-produced by Studio Gokumi and AXsiZ, aired in Japan between January 4 and March 22, 2018, and was simulcast by Crunchyroll. The series was directed by Kenji Seto with scripts by Tatsuya Takahashi and character designs by Takuya Tani. The opening theme is "Feeling Around" by Minori Suzuki, while the ending theme is "Love Men Holic" by Shiena Nishizawa.

No.	Title (Note: All English episode titles are taken from Crunchyroll.)	Original release date
1	"Garlic With Extra Vegetables"; Transliteration: "Yasaimashi Ninniku Karame" (Japanese: ヤサイマシニンニクカラメ)	January 4, 2018
1	"Maayu"; Transliteration: "Māyu" (Japanese: まーゆ)	January 4, 2018
1	"Rich"; Transliteration: "Kotteri" (Japanese: こってり)	January 4, 2018
Yū Ōsawa takes an interest in the silent transfer student, Koizumi, and ends up joining her in line for a ramen shop. Picking the same pork ramen with garlic and extra vegetables as Koizumi picked, Yū bears witness to Koizumi's love of ramen, getting to see a side of her that she does not usually show. Later, Yū goes to the school cafeteria to try its Māyu ramen, learning about the various kinds of ramen from Koizumi. On another day, Yū follows Koizumi to another restaurant where she indulges in a ramen made from a rich broth.
2	"Hokkyoku"; Transliteration: "Hokkyoku" (Japanese: 北極)	January 11, 2018
2	"K-K-K-K-Koizumi-san"; Transliteration: "Ko-Ko-Ko-Ko-Koizumi-san" (Japanese: コココココイズミサン)	January 11, 2018
After just being dumped by her boyfriend, Yū's friend Misa Nakamura follows Koizumi to a ramen shop and ends up picking its spiciest dish, Hokkyoku ramen. Taking a liking to the extremely spicy ramen, Misa lets out her frustration over her breakup and becomes friends with Koizumi. Later, Yū's other friend, Jun Takahashi, is asked to speak with Koizumi about her poor test results, which turns out to be because she was exhausted following a ramen pilgrimage. Hearing about all the peculiar flavors of ramen Koizumi has tried, Jun decides to try out a Pineapple Shrimp Salt ramen at a local ramen shop, finding she still loves ramen despite how it fogs up her glasses.
3	"Saimin"; Transliteration: "Saimin" (Japanese: サイミン)	January 18, 2018
3	"Flavor Concentration Counter"; Transliteration: "Aji Shūchū Kauntā" (Japanese: 味集中カウンター)	January 18, 2018
3	"Instant Noodles"; Transliteration: "Sokusekimen" (Japanese: 即席麺)	January 18, 2018
As Yū tries to invite Koizumi to a WcDaniel's restaurant, Koizumi explains how she once had saimin noodle soup from a WcDaniel's branch in Hawaii. Later, Yū goes with Koizumi to a peculiar restaurant where customers eat in secluded cubicles and order using forms. After finding Koizumi collapsed from starvation due to her favorite restaurant being closed, Yū takes her back to her house and makes her various homemade ramen dishes, which prove to be a hit with her.
4	"Western Restaurant"; Transliteration: "Yōshokuten" (Japanese: ようしょくてん)	January 25, 2018
4	"Red or White"; Transliteration: "Aka oa Shiro" (Japanese: 赤or白)	January 25, 2018
4	"Convenience Store"; Transliteration: "Konbini" (Japanese: コンビニ)	January 25, 2018
Worried over whether Koizumi has a boyfriend, Yū follows her to a Western restaurant, where she seems to meet up with a bunch of guys. To her relief, Yū discovers that Koizumi was simply waiting for an open space in a ramen stand behind the restaurant. Later, Yū goes to a ramen restaurant with Misa, each ordering red Akamaru ramen and white Karaka ramen respectively, while Koizumi goes to it moments after they leave. During the weekend, Jun comes across Koizumi at a convenience store and tries out her recommendation of instant ramen.
5	"Tomato Ramen"; Transliteration: "Tomato Rāmen" (Japanese: トマトラーメン)	February 1, 2018
5	"Euglena"; Transliteration: "Midorimushi" (Japanese: ミドリムシ)	February 1, 2018
5	"Huge Line"; Transliteration: "Gyōretsu" (Japanese: 行列)	February 1, 2018
Koizumi enjoys her latest favorite, Tomato Ramen, while Yū provides her own commentary. Upon hearing about the beneficial algae, euglena, Jun goes with Koizumi to try some green ramen which is rich in euglena. Later, Yū stands in a huge line for a popular ramen shop with the intent of switching out with Koizumi, getting angry with someone else when he cuts his friends in. In the end, they get told off by Koizumi and all decide to go to the back of the line to show their appreciation for the ramen.
6	"Morning Ramen"; Transliteration: "Asa Rāmen" (Japanese: 朝ラーメン)	February 8, 2018
6	"Hiyashi"; Transliteration: "Hiyashi" (Japanese: 冷やし)	February 8, 2018
6	"Museum"; Transliteration: "Hakubutsukan" (Japanese: 博物館)	February 8, 2018
Koizumi gets up early in the morning to eat some dried sardine ramen, catching the eye of Yū's older brother, Shū, who tries the same thing. On a hot sunny day, the girls take Koizumi's cue and try various types of cold hiyashi ramen. While attending a ramen fayre at a museum, Koizumi comes across a lost German girl named Hannah, sharing some of her ramen with her before helping her reunite with her mother. As thanks, she receives a voucher for some German-style ramen.
7	"Nationwide"; Transliteration: "Zenkoku" (Japanese: 全国)	February 15, 2018
As summer vacation begins, Yū, Misa, and Jun go to an amusement park together before touring around Asakusa in yukata. Afterwards, Yū runs into Koizumi and decides to accompany her on a "nationwide" ramen tour around the city, trying ramen from across Japan.
8	"Local Instant Noodles"; Transliteration: "Gotōchi Fukuromen" (Japanese: ご当地袋麺)	February 22, 2018
8	"Iekei"; Transliteration: "Iekei" (Japanese: 家系)	February 22, 2018
While Yū and Misa go to the Katase Higashi beach, Jun accompanies Koizumi to a shop that serves local variants of instant ramen from all across the country, becoming curious about what career she is aiming for. Later, Shū and his friends go to an iekei-style restaurant to try ramen with rice, becoming awed when Koizumi enters the same restaurant.
9	"Mountain"; Transliteration: "Yama" (Japanese: 山)	March 1, 2018
9	"Pork Guy"; Transliteration: "Buta Yarō" (Japanese: 豚野郎)	March 1, 2018
9	"Fatty Pork Roast"; Transliteration: "Seabura" (Japanese: 背脂)	March 1, 2018
Koizumi hikes up Mount Tsukuba in order to work up an appetite for its local ramen shop. Misa's younger brother Kenta tries to tackle the sizeable Buta Yarō ramen in Akihabara, he becomes motivated after seeing Koizumi easily manage the mega-sized portion. Later, Misa, believing Koizumi to have some secret behind her beauty, inadvertently ends up ordering a ramen full of back fat alongside her, leading to an addiction.
10	"Ramen With Unknown Flavor"; Transliteration: "Michi Aji no Rāmen" (Japanese: 未知味の拉麺)	March 8, 2018
10	"Running Ramen"; Transliteration: "Mawaru Rāmen" (Japanese: まわるラーメン)	March 8, 2018
10	"Accepting Challenges!!"; Transliteration: "Chōsen Uketsukechū!!" (Japanese: 挑戦受付中!!)	March 8, 2018
Yū becomes curious about a mysterious blue ramen that Koizumi was eating. Shū invites Yū to a conveyor belt sushi restaurant where they spot Koizumi enjoying one of its ramen dishes, prompting them to order some themselves. Later, Jun invites everyone to a Chūka restaurant in Kagurazaka to help her eat a massive gyōza her mother had reserved, with Koizumi ordering countless ramen dishes on top of it.
11	"Tasty Ramen"; Transliteration: "Oishii Rāmen" (Japanese: おいしいラーメン)	March 15, 2018
11	"Osaka"; Transliteration: "Ōsaka" (Japanese: 大坂)	March 15, 2018
Yū tries to recall a tasty ramen she ate in Osaka when she was a kid, which turns out to be a dish literally called Tasty Ramen. After Yū and Koizumi go to a Tokyo branch at Kabukichō to try the dish, Koizumi goes on a ramen pilgrimage to Osaka where she encounters a woman named Ayane. Serving as Koizumi's bodyguard against guys trying to pick her up, Ayane accompanies Koizumi during her remaining ramen stops. Hearing about how Ayane is due to leave Osaka after quitting her job, Koizumi takes her to a ramen restaurant that she remembers from her childhood, but is later slightly disconcerted upon discovering that Ayane is actually Yū's cousin.
12	"Nagoya"; Transliteration: "Nagoya" (Japanese: 名古屋)	March 22, 2018
12	"Reunion"; Transliteration: "Saikai" (Japanese: 再会)	March 22, 2018
While heading home from Osaka, Yū ends up stranded in Nagoya after seemingly spotting Koizumi from afar and hopping off the train. With only 500 yen on hand, Yū goes to a fast food ramen shop, where she thankfully runs into Koizumi. Later in Autumn, Koizumi catches a cold and ends up taking several days off school, her continued absence taking its toll on Yū. After Koizumi eventually recovers, Yū decides to leave her alone to let her enjoy her first ramen in weeks.

== Reception ==
It was reported in March 2017 that the first four volumes of the manga series have sold over 840,000 copies in Japan.

== See also ==
- Watari-kun's ****** Is About to Collapse, another manga series with the same author
