= Iris the Movie: Full Energy!! =

2024 Japanese animated film directed by Hiroshi Ikehata

- Directed by: Hiroshi Ikehata
- Written by: Hiroko Fukuda
- Starring: Saki Yamakita; Yu Serizawa; Himika Akaneya; Yuki Wakai; Miyu Kubota
- Music by: Yukari Hashimoto; Ruka Kawada; Tetsuya Shitara; Yayoi Sekimukai
- Production company: Studio Gokumi
- Distributed by: Avex Pictures
- Release date: May 17, 2024
- Running time: 60 minutes
- Country: Japan
- Language: Japanese

i☆Ris the Movie: Full Energy!! is a 2024 Japanese animated film based on the idol group Iris. Produced by Studio Gokumi and distributed by Avex Pictures, the film is directed by Hiroshi Ikehata and written by Hiroko Fukuda. The film premiered in Japanese theaters on May 17, 2024.

== Voice cast ==
Character	Japanese
Saki Yamakita	Herself
Yu Serizawa	Herself
Himika Akaneya	Herself
Yuki Wakai	Herself
Miyu Kubota	Herself
Shiro Risu (シロリス)	Rie Takahashi
Kuro Risu (クロリス)	Mitsuki Saiga

== Production and release ==
The film's trailer

The film was announced on November 7, 2022, as part of Iris' tenth anniversary. It was produced by Studio Gokumi and directed by Hiroshi Ikehata, with Hiroko Fukuda writing the scripts, Kazuyuki Ueta designing the characters, and Yukari Hashimoto, Ruka Kawada, Tetsuya Shitara, and Yayoi Sekimukai composing the music. The film was distributed by Avex Pictures and premiered in Japanese theaters on May 17, 2024. The film's theme song is "Ai for You!" (愛 for you!) composed by Masayoshi Ōishi, while the insert song is "Kibō no Hana o" (希望の花を) composed by Kenta Matsukuma, both of which were performed by Iris.
