= Studio Gokumi =

Japanese animation studio

Studio Gokumi Co., Ltd.
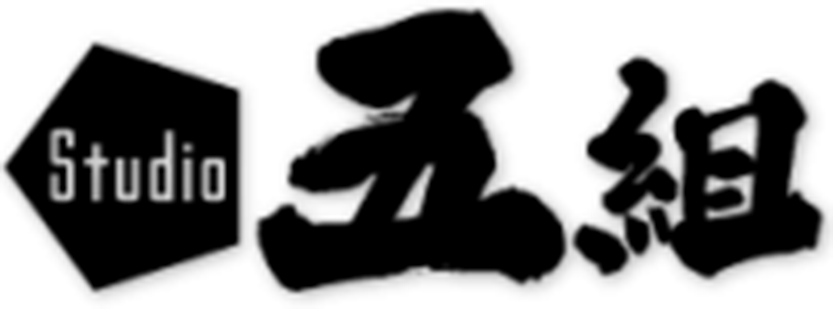
- Native name: 株式会社Studio五組
- Romanized name: Kabushiki-gaisha Sutajio Gokumi
- Type: Kabushiki gaisha
- Industry: Japanese animation
- Founded: May 2010
- Headquarters: Suginami, Tokyo, Japan
- Key people: Tomonori Shibata (president)
- Website: www.gokumi.co.jp

Studio Gokumi Co., Ltd. (Japanese: 株式会社Studio五組, Hepburn: Kabushiki-gaisha Sutajio Gokumi) is a Japanese animation studio established by former Gonzo members.

== History ==
Studio Gokumi, literally meaning "Studio Group 5", was founded in May 2010 after members of Gonzo's Studio Number 5 left the company to start one of their own. Studio Number 5 was responsible at Gonzo for the anime series Strike Witches and Saki.

Studio Gokumi's first production was an original video animation for Koe de Oshigoto! at the end of 2010. In spring 2011, A Channel debuted as the first anime television series for the studio. Production of Saki was taken over by Studio Gokumi for the Saki: Achiga-hen season, which aired from April 9 to July 2, 2012.

== Works ==
=== Television series ===
Title	Director	First run start date	First run end date	Eps	Note(s)
A Channel	Manabu Ono	April 8, 2011	June 24, 2011	12	Adaptation of a four-panel manga series written by bb Kuroda.
Saki Achiga-hen episode of Side-A	Manabu Ono	April 9, 2012	May 25, 2013	16	Adaptation of a manga series written by Ritz Kobayashi.
Nakaimo – My Sister Is Among Them!	Munenori Nawa	July 6, 2012	September 28, 2012	12	Adaptation of a light novel series written by Hajime Taguchi.
The Ambition of Oda Nobuna	Yūji Kumazawa	July 9, 2012	September 24, 2012	12	Adaptation of a light novel series written by Mikage Kasuga. Co-produced with Madhouse.
The Severing Crime Edge	Yūji Yamaguchi	April 4, 2013	June 27, 2013	13	Adaptation of a manga series written by Tatsuhiko Hikagi.
Kin-iro Mosaic	Tensho	July 6, 2013	September 21, 2013	12	Adaptation of a four-panel manga series written by Yui Hara.
Saki: The Nationals	Manabu Ono	January 5, 2014	April 6, 2014	13	Sequel to Saki.
Atelier Escha & Logy: Alchemists of the Dusk Sky	Yoshiaki Iwasaki	April 10, 2014	June 26, 2014	12	Based on a role-playing video game by Gust Co. Ltd.
Yuki Yuna is a Hero	Seiji Kishi	October 17, 2014	December 26, 2014	12	Original work by Takahiro.
Hello!! Kin-iro Mosaic	Tensho	April 5, 2015	June 21, 2015	12	Sequel to Kin-iro Mosaic.
Lance N' Masques	Kyōhei Ishiguro	October 1, 2015	December 17, 2015	12	Adaptation of a light novel series written by Hideaki Koyasu.
Pandora in the Crimson Shell: Ghost Urn	Munenori Nawa	January 8, 2016	March 25, 2016	12	Adaptation of a manga series written by Masamune Shirow. Co-produced with AXsiZ.
Seiren	Tomoki Kobayashi	January 5, 2017	March 23, 2017	12	Original work. Co-produced with AXsiZ.
Tsuredure Children	Hiraku Kaneko	July 4, 2017	September 19, 2017	12	Adaptation of a four-panel manga series written by Toshiya Wakabayashi.
Yuki Yuna is a Hero: Washio Sumi Chapter	Seiji Kishi (Note: Credited as Chief Director (総監督, Sō Kantoku).); Daisei Fukuoka	October 7, 2017	November 18, 2017	7	Prequel to Yuki Yuna is a Hero; television version.
Yuki Yuna is a Hero: Hero Chapter	Seiji Kishi; Daisei Fukuoka	November 25, 2017	January 6, 2018	6	Sequel to Yuki Yuna is a Hero.
Ms. Koizumi Loves Ramen Noodles	Kenji Seto	January 4, 2018	March 22, 2018	12	Adaptation of a manga series written by Naru Narumi. Co-produced with AXsiZ.
Katana Maidens: Toji No Miko	Kōdai Kakimoto	January 5, 2018	June 22, 2018	24	Based on a Japanese media franchise by Genco.
Ms. Vampire Who Lives in My Neighborhood	Noriaki Akitaya	October 5, 2018	December 21, 2018	12	Adaptation of a four-panel manga series written by Amatou. Co-produced with AXsiZ.
Endro!	Kaori	January 12, 2019	March 30, 2019	12	Original work.
Seton Academy: Join the Pack!	Hiroshi Ikehata	January 7, 2020	March 24, 2020	12	Adaptation of a manga series written by Bungo Yamashita.
Maesetsu!	Yuu Nobuta	October 11, 2020	December 27, 2020	12	Original work. Co-produced with AXsiZ.
Yuki Yuna is a Hero: The Great Mankai Chapter	Seiji Kishi	October 2, 2021	December 18, 2021	12	Sequel to Yuki Yuna is a Hero: Hero Chapter.
World's End Harem	Yuu Nobuta	October 8, 2021	March 18, 2022	11	Adaptation of a manga series written by LINK. Co-produced with AXsiZ.
Phantom of the Idol	Daisei Fukuoka	July 2, 2022	September 3, 2022	10	Adaptation of a manga series written by Hijiki Isoflavone.
The Dreaming Boy Is a Realist	Kazuomi Koga	July 4, 2023	September 19, 2023	12	Adaptation of a light novel series written by Okemaru. Co-produced with AXsiZ.
Reborn as a Vending Machine, I Now Wander the Dungeon	Noriaki Akitaya	July 5, 2023	September 20, 2023	12	Adaptation of a light novel series written by Hirukuma. Co-produced with AXsiZ.
Stardust Telepath	Kaori	October 9, 2023	December 25, 2023	12	Adaptation of a four-panel manga series written by Rasuko Ōkuma.
I Got Married to the Girl I Hate Most in Class	Hiroyuki Oshima	January 3, 2025	March 21, 2025	12	Adaptation of a light novel series written by Seiju Amano. Co-produced with AXsiZ.
Necronomico and the Cosmic Horror Show	Masato Matsune	July 1, 2025	September 16, 2025	12	Original work.
Reborn as a Vending Machine, I Now Wander the Dungeon (season 2)	Takashi Yamamoto	July 2, 2025	September 17, 2025	12	Sequel to Reborn as a Vending Machine, I Now Wander the Dungeon. Co-produced with AXsiZ.
Secrets of the Silent Witch	Takaomi Kanasaki; Yasuo Iwamoto	July 5, 2025	October 5, 2025	13	Adaptation of a light novel series written by Matsuri Isora.
Reborn as a Vending Machine, I Now Wander the Dungeon (season 3)	Takashi Yamamoto	April 1, 2026	June 24, 2026	12	Sequel to Reborn as a Vending Machine, I Now Wander the Dungeon season 2. Co-produced with AXsiZ.
7-nin no Nemuri Hime	Mankyū	2027	TBA	TBA	Adaptation of a manga series written by Fiok Lee. Co-produced with AXsiZ Smash.

=== Films ===
Title	Director	Release date	Note(s)
Pandora in the Crimson Shell: Ghost Urn	Munenori Nawa	December 5, 2015	A film adaptation of Masamune Shirow's manga series. Co-produced with AXsiZ.
Yuki Yuna is a Hero: Washio Sumi Chapter	Seiji Kishi; Daisei Fukuoka	March 18, 2017 (part 1); April 15, 2017 (part 2); July 8, 2017 (part 3)	Prequel to Yuki Yuna is a Hero.
Laidbackers	Kiyomitsu Sato; Hiroyuki Hashimoto	April 5, 2019	Original work.
Kin-iro Mosaic: Thank You!!	Munenori Nawa	August 20, 2021	Sequel to Hello!! Kin-iro Mosaic. Co-produced with AXsiZ.
Iris the Movie: Full Energy!!	Hiroshi Ikehata	May 17, 2024	Original work. 10th anniversary commemoration to idol girl group i☆Ris.

=== OVAs ===
Title	Director	Release date	Note(s)
Koe de Oshigoto! The Animation	Naoto Hosoda	November 17, 2010– May 11, 2011	Adaptation of a manga series written by Azure Konno.
A Channel + smile	Manabu Ono	March 21, 2012– September 27, 2017	Sequel to A Channel.
Saki Biyori	Manabu Ono	July 25, 2015– September 27, 2017	Adaptation of a manga series written by Ritz Kobayashi.
Kin-iro Mosaic: Pretty Days	Tensho	November 12, 2016	An OVA episode of Kin-iro Mosaic. Co-produced with AXsiZ.
