= AXsiZ =

Japanese animation studio

AXsiZ Co., Ltd.
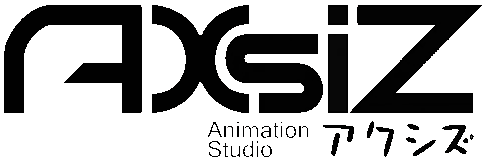

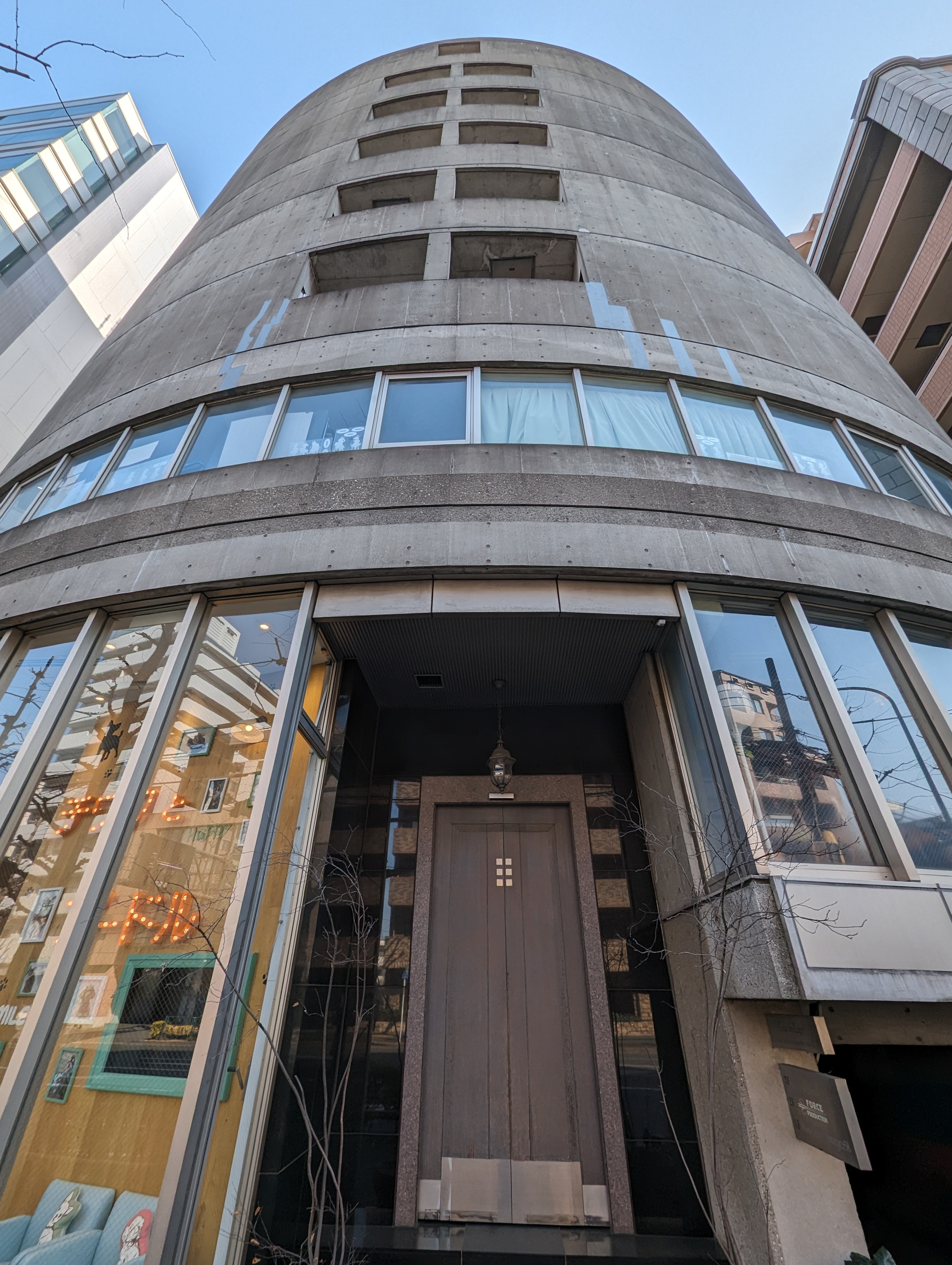
- The Cour de Lodge building, where AXsiZ's head office is located
- Native name: 株式会社AXsiZ
- Romanized name: Kabushiki-gaisha Akushizu
- Type: Kabushiki-gaisha
- Industry: Japanese animation
- Founded: July 7, 2011; 15 years ago
- Founder: Yasuhiro Kuroda
- Headquarters: 1-21-15 Umezato, Suginami, Tokyo, Japan
- Key people: Yasuhiro Kuroda (CEO)
- Divisions: AXsiZ Graphic
- Website: www.axsiz.co.jp

AXsiZ Co., Ltd. (Japanese: 株式会社AXsiZ, Hepburn: Kabushiki-gaisha Akushizu) is a Japanese animation studio established on July 7, 2011 by staff of Studio Gokumi's former second production studio, with which the company has a close relationship with.

== Works ==
=== Television series ===
| Year | Title | Director(s) | Animation producer(s) | Source | Eps. | Refs. |
|---|---|---|---|---|---|---|
| 2016 | Pandora in the Crimson Shell: Ghost Urn (co-animated with Studio Gokumi) | Munenori Nawa | Tetsuya Tomioka | Manga | 12 | |
| 2016 | Wagamama High Spec | Satoshi Shimizu | Kouichi Tamino | Eroge visual novel | 12 | |
| 2017 | Seiren (co-animated with Studio Gokumi) | Tomoki Kobayashi | Tetsuya Tomioka | Original work | 12 | |
| 2018 | Ms. Koizumi Loves Ramen Noodles (co-animated with Studio Gokumi) | Kenji Seto | Tetsuya Tomioka | Manga | 12 | |
| 2018 | Ms. Vampire Who Lives in My Neighborhood (co-animated with Studio Gokumi) | Noriaki Akitaya | Tetsuya Tomioka | Manga | 12 | |
| 2018 | Ulysses: Jeanne d'Arc and the Alchemist Knight | Shin Itagaki | Kouichi Tamino; Hiroshi Ishida | Light novel | 12 | |
| 2020 | Maesetsu! (co-animated with Studio Gokumi) | Yuu Nobuta | Tetsuya Tomioka | Original work | 12 | |
| 2021–2022 | World's End Harem (co-animated with Studio Gokumi) | Yuu Nobuta | Tetsuya Tomioka | Manga | 11 | |
| 2023 | Reborn as a Vending Machine, I Now Wander the Dungeon (co-animated with Studio Gokumi) | Noriaki Akitaya | Tetsuya Tomioka | Light novel | 12 | |
| 2023 | The Dreaming Boy Is a Realist (co-animated with Studio Gokumi) | Kazuomi Koga | Tetsuya Tomioka | Light novel | 12 | |
| 2025 | I Got Married to the Girl I Hate Most in Class (co-animated with Studio Gokumi) | Hiroyuki Oshima | Tetsuya Tomioka | Light novel | 12 | |
| 2025 | Reborn as a Vending Machine, I Now Wander the Dungeon (season 2) (co-animated with Studio Gokumi) | Takashi Yamamoto | TBA | Light novel | 12 | |
| 2026 | Reborn as a Vending Machine, I Now Wander the Dungeon (season 3) (co-animated with Studio Gokumi) | Takashi Yamamoto | TBA | Light novel | 12 | |
| 2027 | 7-nin no Nemuri Hime (co-animated with Studio Gokumi) | Mankyū | TBA | Manga | TBA | |

=== OVA ===
| Year | Title | Director(s) | Animation producer(s) | Source | Eps. | Refs. |
|---|---|---|---|---|---|---|
| 2016 | Kin-iro Mosaic: Pretty Days | Tensho | Tetsuya Tomioka | Manga | 1 | |

=== Films ===
| Year | Title | Director(s) | Animation producer(s) | Source | Refs. |
|---|---|---|---|---|---|
| 2015 | Pandora in the Crimson Shell: Ghost Urn (co-animated with Studio Gokumi) | Munenori Nawa | Tetsuya Tomioka | Manga | |
| 2021 | Kin-iro Mosaic: Thank You!! (co-animated with Studio Gokumi) | Munenori Nawa | Tetsuya Tomioka | Manga | |

== Notable staff ==
=== Representative staff ===
- Yasuhiro Kuroda (founder and president)

=== Animation producers ===
- Kouichi Tamino (2012~present)
- Tetsuya Tomioka
