= Reborn as a Vending Machine, I Now Wander the Dungeon =

Japanese light novel series

- The cover of the original edition of the first light novel, featuring Boxxo and Lammis

自動販売機に生まれ変わった俺は迷宮を彷徨う (Jidōhanbaiki ni Umarekawatta Ore wa Meikyū o Samayō)
- Genre: Fantasy comedy; Isekai
- Novel series
- Written by: Hirukuma
- Published by: Shōsetsuka ni Narō
- Original run: March 3, 2016 – December 18, 2016
- Light novel
- Written by: Hirukuma
- Illustrated by: Itsuwa Kato (original edition); Yūki Hagure (revised edition)
- Published by: Kadokawa Shoten
- English publisher: NA: Yen Press
- Imprint: Kadokawa Sneaker Bunko
- Original run: August 1, 2016 – present
- Volumes: 4
- Manga
- Written by: Hirukuma
- Illustrated by: Kunieda
- Published by: ASCII Media Works
- English publisher: NA: Yen Press
- Magazine: Dengeki Daioh
- Original run: August 27, 2021 – present
- Volumes: 2
- Anime television series
- Directed by: Noriaki Akitaya (S1); Takashi Yamamoto (S2–S3)
- Written by: Tatsuya Takahashi
- Music by: Yuta Uraki; Keita Takahashi
- Studio: Studio Gokumi; AXsiZ
- Licensed by: Crunchyroll (Note: In North America through Crunchyroll, LLC.)
- Original network: Tokyo MX, BS NTV, AT-X
- Original run: July 5, 2023 – June 24, 2026
- Episodes: 36
- icon

Reborn as a Vending Machine, I Now Wander the Dungeon (Japanese: 自動販売機に生まれ変わった俺は迷宮を彷徨う, Hepburn: Jidōhanbaiki ni Umarekawatta Ore wa Meikyū o Samayō; lit. "Reborn as a Vending Machine, I Wander Through the Labyrinth") is a Japanese light novel series written by Hirukuma and illustrated by Itsuwa Kato (original edition) and Yūki Hagure (revised edition). The series was originally published in 2016 as a web novel by the author on the user-generated novel publishing website Shōsetsuka ni Narō. Later on the same year, it was acquired and then published by Kadokawa Shoten.

The light novels follow its titular protagonist who, after being crushed to death by a vending machine, is reincarnated as a sentient vending machine in a fantasy dungeon world. Shortly after, he meets and befriends Lammis, a young female hunter, who names him "Boxxo" and starts carrying him around on her back, and the two start their adventures in the dungeon together.

A manga adaptation by Kunieda began serialization ASCII Media Works's shōnen manga magazine Dengeki Daioh in August 2021. Both the light novel and manga have been licensed in English by Yen Press. An anime television series adaptation by Studio Gokumi and AXsiZ aired from July to September 2023. A second season aired from July to September 2025. A third and final season was aired from April to June 2026.

Reborn as a Vending Machine has been well received by critics, with particular praise being directed at the novels' unique take on the isekai genre.

== Synopsis ==
An unnamed Japanese otaku who is interested in vending machines is crushed to death by a falling vending machine. He then finds himself reincarnated in a fantasy world dungeon as a sentient vending machine. He can see and hear but is immobile, with his speech being limited to stock Japanese vending machine phrases, such as "Hello there" or "Too bad". As a vending machine, he discovers he can dispense any item he has bought in his previous life, and can convert such sales to points, thus sustaining his existence. He is also able to use excess coins to add additional features to his vending machine body, and is able to choose which items he stocks or the prices of the items. Furthermore, he is able to use some magical abilities, including shapeshifting, invisibility, telekinesis, and a defensive vector force field. In this world, people are granted special powers from God called blessings.

Stuck in the middle of the wilderness, he encounters Lammis, a young female hunter. Lammis has a skill known as the Blessing of Might, which makes her ridiculously strong, but is still a novice at managing her own strength. The two quickly become friends after he dispenses some food items to the hungry Lammis. Calling him "Boxxo", she starts carrying him around on her back, which allows Boxxo to move, with his weight allowing her to more easily control her strength. The series chronicles their adventures as they start exploring the world's dungeon, and the characters they meet on the way.

=== Background ===
In the afterword of the first volume, Hirukuma describes his envisioning and road to publishing Reborn as a Vending Machine. He at first helped out with his father's independent business, though after the death of his father from a high fall, he closed down the business and began pursuing his ambition as a writer. He described his father's death as giving him acrophobia, and recalled thinking "I don't know when I'm going to die like my father did. One question went through my mind: Have I done everything I've wanted to in life?" On a site for submitting novels called Shōsetsuka ni Narō, he submitted several works of fiction, including another isekai piece and a battle-themed novel set in the near future, but was initially unsuccessful.

He described Reborn as a Vending Machine as his final effort after four years of unsuccessfully getting his novels published. Hirukuma wrote that "[it was] one that was fantastical and original, and one that I wanted to write ... This wasn't a novel where I adjusted for the readers' needs, or had to think long and hard about constructing a plot. Instead, I pursued my own style for it, and it garnered the most popularity of all my work".

== Characters ==
Boxxo (ハッコン, Hakkon)
Voiced by: Jun Fukuyama (Japanese); Garret Storms (Note: Austin Tindle filled in for Storms as Boxxo from episodes 13–19.) (English)
Prior to being reincarnated as a sentient vending machine in a fantasy world, Boxxo was a vending machine otaku who was crushed by a falling vending machine in Japan. His current name was given to him by Lammis. As a vending machine, Boxxo can only communicate in stock vending machine phrases, although he can still speak to himself in his thoughts and he can see and hear just fine; however, he is soon able to use the letters in his limited speech to spell out what he is trying to say. He is able to sell and dispense an unlimited number of products, which rewards him with points he can use to upgrade himself and can make food packagings and wrappings disappear. He is also built with a small digital slot machine, has the ability to shapeshift, has a blessing that enables him to create a forcefield around him for defense, use telekinesis, raise or lower his temperature, and can reward people with free products. He has a crush on Lammis, affectionately referring to her as "partner"; though Hulemy, Shui, and Pity have feelings for him too. At the end of the story, Boxxo gains the ability to combine his vending machine functions, take on all of his forms at once with a time limit, and even gains a human form.
Lammis (ラッミス, Rammisu)
Voiced by: Kaede Hondo (Japanese); Emily Neves (English)
Lammis is a young, energetic hunter with a special ability called the Blessing of Might, which makes her incredibly strong, though she is clumsy at controlling her own strength. This is resolved when she carries Boxxo on her back, allowing her better control of her strength. She lives on the Clearflow Lake stratum. Lammis is Boxxo's primary love interest and means of transportation, the latter because she is one of the only humans who can carry Boxxo on her own. She hates losing her friends and loved ones due to her parents being killed by monsters and her village being destroyed in the attack. Due to her closeness with Boxxo, she gets emotionally upset if they are separated and will stop at nothing to find him.
Hulemy (ヒュールミ, Hyūrumi)
Voiced by: Shiki Aoki (season 1), Kotomi Aihara (season 2–3) (Japanese); Elizabeth Maxwell (English)
A childhood friend of Lammis who behaves more like an older sister. Hulemy is a talented magical item engineer and has a tomboyish personality. She is the first to discover that Boxxo contains a human soul inside him. Like Lammis, she lost her parents and village in a monster attack. She also appears to have feelings for Boxxo.
Suori (スオリ)
Voiced by: Shizuku Hoshinoya (Japanese); Macy Anne Johnson (English)
The daughter of a rich tycoon who is selfish, arrogant, and strong-willed. Suori has taken an interest in Boxxo, so much so that she even once tried to buy him. She also has a rival named Kanashi, whom she hates above all else. Through her interactions with Boxxo, she learns to be more selfless and mindful of others, using her wealth and resources to help the residents of the Clearflow Lake stratum during emergencies and times of need.
Director Bear (熊会長, Kuma Kaichō)
Voiced by: Atsushi Miyauchi (Japanese); Christopher Sabat (English)
A literal bear who is the director of the Hunter's Association on the Clearflow Lake stratum. His real name is Bommy (ボミー, Bomī). Like Lammis, he is strong enough to carry Boxxo. He is a strong fighter, his claws are razor sharp to cut through even solid stone, and he can emit a super sonic roar.
Kerioyl (ケリオイル, Kerioiru)
Voiced by: Kazuya Nakai (Japanese); Bradley Gareth (English)
The leader of the Menagerie of Fools. He is quite arrogant, but is a very skilled fighter. Boxxo has personal issues towards him. It is later revealed that he and Filmina are married and that Aka and Shino are their sons. They also have a third son named Kai, who is suffering a curse that is quickly making him decay. To save him, he and his family secretly aid the Netherlord in his scheme in exchange for a cure; this revelation causes the rest of the team to turn on him and his family. He also possesses a blessing that can disable other people's blessings. He and his family soon turned against the Netherlord after he intended to dispose of them for letting Boxxo escape, but that was later revealed to be part of the Netherlord's plan to complete his goal. Even so, he and his family are no longer allies to the Netherlord.
Filmina (フィルミナ, Firumina)
Voiced by: Ai Kayano (Japanese); Molly Searcy (English)
Kerioyl's second-in-command of the Menagerie of Fools who can use water magic. She usually gets annoyed with her leader's arrogance. It is later revealed that she is part vamp fiend (vampire) and also has a vampire form. It is also revealed that she and Kerioyl are actually married and that Aka and Shino are their sons. Furthermore, they have a third son named Kai, who is suffering a curse that is quickly making him decay. To save him, she and her family secretly aid the Netherlord in his scheme in exchange for a cure. She and her family soon turned against the Netherlord after he intended to dispose of them for letting Boxxo escape, but that was later revealed to be part of the Netherlord's plan to complete his goal.
Shui (シュイ)
Voiced by: Miyu Tomita (Japanese); Hannah Alyea (English)
A huntress whom Lammis befriends. She serves as a member of the Menagerie of Fools and has a monstrous appetite. Like Lammis and Hulemy, she also appears to have feelings for Boxxo.
Shirley (シャーリィ, Shārī)
Voiced by: Nanako Mori (Japanese); Anastasia Muñoz (English)
A cordial, beautiful woman who runs a "business of the night" on the Clearflow Lake stratum. Boxxo takes a liking to her. It is implied she has a crush on Director Bear, blushing whenever he compliments her; however, Gorth also has feelings for her. She is also a strong hunter and fights with a whip.
Aka (赤)
Voiced by: Daiki Yamashita (Japanese); Bryson Baugus (English)
A member of the Menagerie of Fools. It is later revealed that he and Shiro are Kerioyl and Filmina's sons and they have been secretly helping the Netherlord to save their brother Kai from a curse. He is also part vampire. He and his family soon turned against the Netherlord after he intended to dispose of them for letting Boxxo escape, but that was later revealed to be part of the Netherlord's plan to complete his goal.
Shiro (白)
Voiced by: Junya Enoki (Japanese); Jan Aponte (English)
A member of the Menagerie of Fools. It is later revealed that he and Aka are Kerioyl and Filmina's sons and they have been secretly helping the Netherlord to save their brother Kai from a curse. He is also part vampire. He and his family soon turned against the Netherlord after he intended to dispose of them for letting Boxxo escape, but that was later revealed to be part of the Netherlord's plan to complete his goal.
Mishuel (ミシュエル, Mishueru)
Voiced by: Takuya Eguchi (Japanese); Aaron Campbell (English)
A handsome hunter who appears charming on the outside. On the inside, however, he is shown to be somewhat of a coward and is not good with communication. He later joins the Menagerie of Fools and becomes Boxxo's apprentice. It is later revealed that he has a sister named Hayachi.
Suco (スコ, Suko), Pell (ペル, Peru), Short (ショート, Shōto), and Mikenne (ミケネ, Mikene)
Suco: Voiced by: Shiori Izawa (Japanese); Kate Oxley (English)
Pell: Voiced by: Yū Serizawa (Japanese); Trina Nishimura (English)
Short: Voiced by: Sora Tokui (Japanese); Lexi Nieto (English)
Mikenne: Voiced by: Rena Maeda (Japanese); Brittney Karbowski (English)
A group of Bearcats who are known as the Band of Gluttons. They later join the Menagerie of Fools. They are fast and can emit a powerful sonic attack.
Missus (おかみさん, Okami-san) and Munami (ムナミ)
Missus: Voiced by: Risa Hayamizu (Japanese); Monica Rial (English)
Munami: Voiced by: Yuko Okui (Japanese); Marisa Duran (English)
Two women who work at an inn on the Clearflow Lake stratum. They are good friends with Lammis.
Acowi (アコウイ, Akoui)
Voiced by: Hisako Tōjō (Japanese); Jessica Peterson (English)
The owner of the Merchants Exchange.
Gocguy (ゴッガイ, Goggai)
Voiced by: Akinori Egoshi
Acowi's helper. He is skilled with using an axe.
Karios (カリオス, Kariosu) and Gorth (ゴルス, Gorusu)
Karios: Voiced by: Taketora (Japanese); Jarrod Greene (season 1), Bradley Gareth (season 2) (English)
Gorth: Voiced by: Toshiki Iwasawa (Japanese); Bryan Massey (English)
Two guards who protect the Clearflow Lake stratum. Gorth has a crush on Shirley.
Fia (フィア)
Voiced by: Manaka Iwami
A shopkeeper who has a crush on Karios. Boxxo helped them interact upon noticing this.
Gugoyle (グゴイル, Gugoiru)
Voiced by: Shinya Takahashi
A thief who tried to rob Boxxo once. He is a member of a group of bandits.
May (メイ, Mei)
Voiced by: Akane Yabushima (Japanese); Rachel Michelle Thompson (English)
A young girl who once won a free item from Boxxo. She is Shimelai and Yumite's granddaughter.
Kanashi (カナシ)
Voiced by: Misaki Watada
Suori's rival who has a similar personality as her.
Hoxie (ホクシー, Hokushī)
Voiced by: Satsuki Kokubu
The director of the orphanage located on the Origin stratum who is also a skilled hunter, using bows and arrows.
Shimelai (シメライ, Shimerai) and Yumite (ユミテ)
Shimelai: Voiced by: Yuki Tamai (Japanese); R. Bruce Elliott (English)
Yumite: Voiced by: Toko Aoyama (Japanese); Kara Edwards (English)
An elderly couple who are skilled hunters and can use magic. They are May's grandparents.
Director Origin (始まりの会長, Hajimari no Kaichō)
Voiced by: Aino Shimada (Japanese); Maganda Marie (English)
The unnamed director of the Origin stratum. She specializes in combat skills.
Hevee (ヘブイ, Hebui)
Voiced by: Yoshitsugu Matsuoka
A former member of the Menagerie of Fools who has a shoe fetish; it is because they remind him of his deceased childhood friend. He also knows of Boxxo's origins. He also two blessings: the Blessing of Might (which is not as strong as Lammis's) and the ability to alter senses. He can also conjure illusions and fights with two maces.
Kikoyu (キコユ)
Voiced by: Rie Takahashi
A Snow Child who can shield her presence and telepathically read other people's thoughts by touching them. She also has some control over cold air, which grows very powerful when she reaches adulthood. She becomes Boxxo's rival due to her having the ability to use her Piece of Field to create food for people to eat. She, Botan, and Kuroyata eventually leave the dungeon to find and revive Field. They eventually succeed and join the battle against the Netherlord. She is one of Field's love interests.
Botan (ボタン) and Kuroyata (黑八咫)
Botan: Voiced by: Tatsuya Kobayashi^{Ep. 19 credits}
Kuroyata: Voiced by: Mao Yabuki
Kikoyu's monster companions who serves as her protectors rather than her tamed pets.
Field (畑, Hata)
Voiced by: Shun Horie
A sentient field mentioned by Kikoyu who went dormant in the Demon Lord's domain after defeating the original left leg general. He possesses the ability to shapeshift and spell what he wants to say in his soil since he can't talk. Kikoyu carries a piece of him, which can grow crops quickly and convert monster corpses into nutrients. He is also a reincarnated human from Japan like Boxxo, his name having been Noko Hatake in his original life. He is eventually revived (presumably due to Kikoyu returning her piece to Field) and joins the battle against the Netherlord. Kikoyu, Jessica, and Qyoehkotek have feelings for him.
Director Dark (闇の森林会長, Yami no Shinrin Kaichō)
Voiced by: Kazuki Ura
The director of the Dark Forest stratum, whose real name is Dark-Dark. He can flatten himself into a shadow and slip under cracks.
Director Labyrinth
Voiced by: Naoko Nokubi
The director of the Labyrinth stratum. Her real name is unknown.
Director Scorching (灼熱の会長, Shakunetsu no Kaichō)
Voiced by: Tatsuya Kobayashi^{Ep. 23 credits}
The director of the Scorching Sand stratum. His true name is unknown. He possess powerful fire magic.
Director Dog Mountain
Voiced by: Shizuka Ishigami
The director of the Dog Mountain stratum. His true name is unknown. He is technically a young boy who is accompanied by a man.
Pity
Voiced by: Satomi Akesaka
A shy but determined girl who lives in a giant clam. She can fight using her clam as a shield and weapon. She also has a blessing that allows her to alter weight, making her one of the only characters who can carry Boxxo on her own.
Kai
Voiced by: Mao Yabuki
Kerioyl and Filmina's first son, who is under a decaying curse that forces his family to serve the Netherlord in exchange for a cure. Though he looks younger than his brothers Aka and Shiro, he is really older than them. He has also developed a bond with Sulream, but was really pretending this whole time as he knows of her true intentions and wants to free of his pain; he is still on good terms with Sulream despite this. Sulream eventually helps him and his family escape after the Netherlord fired them and Sulream for letting Boxxo escape. His decay curse is eventually broken, which also grants him the power to use it as a blessing on his opponents, but all of this was later revealed to be part of Netherlord's plan to complete his goal. He also has a blessing that allows him to quickly recover. Like his brothers, he is also part vampire.
Jessica
Voiced by: Yukana
The ruler of an unnamed fortified city located outside of the dungeon. Her charm has a strong influence on men. She is one of Field's love interests. However, it is hinted that she is really a guy.
Steck
Voiced by: Ryotaro Okiayu
Jessica's butler.
Moeder
Voiced by: Miki Nagasawa
Jessica's maid.
Hayachi
Voiced by: Sumire Morohoshi
Mishuel's sister and princess of the fortified city, who is also a skilled warrior and is accompanied by essigs, whom she had befriended. She is also one of Field's allies.
Usatta, Ussarina, Usarion, and Usappi
Four rabbit-like creatures called essigs, who are allies of Hayachi. They are actually a family: Usatta is the father, Ussarina is the mother, and Usarion and Usappi are their kids. They are allies of Field.
King of Souls (死霊王, Shiryō Ō)
Voiced by: Yasuhiro Mamiya
A powerful undead who is a part of the Netherlord.
Kayolings (カヨーリングス, Kayōringusu)
Voiced by: Haruka Michii
A ghostly woman who serves the Netherlord as his pinky finger general. Even though she is a ghost, she is vulnerable to magic. She can create fires and telekinetically control a chain. Due to being a necromancer, she can also convert monster corpses. She is eventually killed by Kerioyl's group, but is later revived by the Netherlord. Though not seen, it can be presumed that she was killed a second time after the Netherlord is defeated.
Tashtay (タシテ, Tashite)
Voiced by: Hinata Tadokoro^{Ep. 23 credits}
A highly arrogance hunter and the leader of a group of bandits called the Billowing Flames. He was responsible for murdering Hevee's childhood friend. He also works for the Netherlord. He is killed by Sulream.
Sulream (スルリィム, Sururyimu)
Voiced by: Ryoko Shiraishi
An alternate adult version of Kikoyu who works for the Netherlord as his ring finger general, having saved her in another timeline. This version never met Field, Botan, and Kuroyata. She has the same powers as her original variant, but also has a blessing that allows her to teleport, but only to places that she has seen before. She soon betrayed the Netherlord after she and Kerioyl's family were fired for letting Boxxo escape, but that was later revealed to be part of the Netherlord's plan to complete his goal; even so, Sulream is no longer a servant to the Netherlord. Kai has a good influence on her.
Dungeon Master
Voiced by: Bin Shimada
An elderly man who created the dungeon. After being wounded by the Netherlord, he sacrifices himself to help the others escape.
Middle Finger General
Voiced by: Takaya Hashi
A shark-like monster who serves the Netherlord. He can use telepathy. He is killed by Boxxo and Pity after he tries to stop them from escaping the Netherlord's fortress.
Forefinger General
Voiced by: Hiroshi Yanaka
A skeletal warrior who serves the Netherlord. He is a skilled fighter. He is eventually killed by Mishuel, the essigs, and Hayachi, but is later revived by the Netherlord. Though not seen, it can be presumed that he was killed a second time after the Netherlord is defeated.
Thumb General
Voiced by: Kyo Yaoya
The Netherlord's mother, who is also the same type of monster as her son. She is killed by Boxxo, but is later revived by the Netherlord. Though not seen, it can be presumed that she was killed a second time after the Netherlord is defeated.
John
The Thumb General's pet monster. After the general is killed, John is sent back to where he came from.
Netherlord (冥府の王, Meifu no Ō)
Voiced by: Show Hayami (Japanese); Jeremy Schwartz (English)
The dungeon's strongest monster and a servant of the Demon Lord, serving as his left arm general. It is implied that he knows Boxxo's origins. It is later revealed that he lured hunters into the dungeon so he could kill them and use their corpses to reproduce his army, while also attempting to conquer the dungeon and seize its power for his own means. He has lots of servants, both humans and supernatural beings, doing his dirty work and is even manipulating Kerioyl and his family into helping him in return for saving their cursed son. However, he soon fires Kerioyl and his family along with Sulream for allowing Boxxo to escape, but he arranged for this to happen as part of his plan. He eventually succeeds in his goal and sets the dungeon to collapse, escaping to the surface with his army of monsters to attack the fortified city. It is later revealed that he is planning to betray his master. His true name is revealed to be Ribby. He was also the original ruler of the demon realm, but was defeated and forced out of power by the Demon Lord. In the end, he is killed by Boxxo and Lammis.
Demon Lord (魔王, Maō)
Voiced by: Jun Fukushima
The Netherlord's master and the previous left arm general, who rules the demon realm after defeating the Netherlord, who was the original ruler. He once tried to conquer the fortified city for its rich soil due to his realm having too little food supplies, but after Field provided him with his crops, he gave up that goal and made peace with both the city and Field, becoming the latter's friend. He recognizes Boxxo's form as a vending machine, declaring the sight of it nostalgic, and easily understands Japanese text; giving the strong implications that he too is a reincarnated soul from Boxxo and Field's world.
Qyoehkotek
Voiced by: Akari Kikunaga
The Demon Lord's new left leg general, who took the position after the original left leg general defeated by Field. She is one of Field's love interests and caretaker. She is also a vampire and a necromancer.
Right Arm General
Voiced by: Takehiro Hasu
The Demon Lord's butler-like right arm general.

== Media ==
=== Light novels ===
Hirukuma originally published the series online as a web novel on the user-generated novel publishing website Shōsetsuka ni Narō from March 3 to December 18, 2016.

Kadokawa Shoten acquired the series to publish it as a light novel. The first volume was published on August 1, 2016. Yen Press announced during the Anime Expo 2017 that they had licensed the series for an English release.

With the release of the anime adaptation, Kadokawa released a revised edition of the light novel with new illustrations provided by Yūki Hagure.

==== Volumes ====
No.	Original release date	Original ISBN	English release date	English ISBN
1	August 1, 2016 (original); June 30, 2023 (revised)	978-4-04-104728-6 (original); 978-4-04-111959-4 (revised)	April 24, 2018	978-0-31-647911-0
2	October 1, 2016 (original); September 1, 2023 (revised)	978-4-04-104729-3 (original); 978-4-04-111960-0 (revised)	August 28, 2018	978-0-31-647913-4
3	February 1, 2017 (original); December 28, 2023 (revised)	978-4-04-105174-0 (original); 978-4-04-111961-7 (revised)	December 18, 2018	978-0-31-647915-8
4	July 1, 2025	—	—	—

=== Manga ===
A manga adaptation illustrated by Kunieda began serialization in ASCII Media Works's shōnen manga magazine Dengeki Daioh on August 27, 2021. The manga is also licensed by Yen Press as a digital simulpublication.

==== Volumes ====
No.	Original release date	Original ISBN	English release date	English ISBN
1	March 25, 2022	978-4-04-914323-2	April 18, 2023	978-1-97-536578-3
2	March 25, 2023	978-4-04-914964-7	March 19, 2024	978-1-97-539024-2

=== Anime ===
In August 2022, it was announced that the series would be receiving an anime adaptation. It was later confirmed to be a television series produced by Slow Curve, animated by Studio Gokumi and AXsiZ and directed by Noriaki Akitaya, with Masayuki Takahashi serving as assistant director, Tatsuya Takahashi overseeing series scripts, Takahiro Sakai adapting Yūki Hagure's designs for animation, and Yuta Uraki and Keita Takahashi composing the music. The series aired from July 5 to September 20, 2023, on Tokyo MX and other networks. The opening theme song is "Fanfare" (ファンファーレ) by BRADIO, while the ending theme song is "Itsumo no Soup" (いつものスープ; "The Usual Soup") by Peel the Apple. (Note: "Fanfare" is used as an insert song in episode 24.) Crunchyroll streamed the series outside of Asia. The first season was released on Blu-ray and DVD in North America on July 23, 2024.

After the airing of the final episode of the first season, a second season was announced. The staff and cast reprised their roles, with Takashi Yamamoto replacing Akitaya as director. The season aired from July 2 to September 17, 2025. The opening theme song is "Mirai Cider" (未来サイダー; Future Cider) performed by BRADIO, while the ending theme song is "Boku Dake no Chiheisen" (僕だけの地平線; A Horizon Only for Me), performed by Aina Aiba.

After the airing of the final episode of the second season, a third season was announced. The season, in which the show entered its final arc, aired from April 1 to June 24, 2026. The opening theme song is "Jihankism" (ジハンキズム; Vending Machinism) performed by Vivarush, while the ending theme song is "Mekurumeku Rendezvous" (めくるめくランデヴー; Dazzling Rendezvous), performed by FUWAMOCO.

== Reception ==
Reborn as a Vending Machine, I Now Wander the Dungeon has received positive reviews. Theron Martin of Anime News Network reviewed the first volume positively, praising its unique take on the isekai genre, Hirukuma's writing style, and the relationship between Boxxo and Lammis, which he found to be impressive and not having to "resort to hackneyed gimmicks". Summarizing that "this novel's bizarre concept is what will catch people's attention, but the writing is good enough to keep it", some criticism was directed at the light novel's fanservice, which Martin found to be forced, and the RPG elements typical of isekai series. Similarly, Robert Frazer of UK Anime Network found Reborn as a Vending Machine to be "a blast of fresh air to flush out the stale isekai genre", as "it's fun and different to defeat the villain with Diet Coke and Mentos instead of just firing a Saiyan blast at a higher powerlevel".

Rebecca Silverman and Lynzee Loveridge, in Anime News Network's Spring 2018 Light Novel Guide, also praised the setting but found the writing to "read like fan-fiction-level quality". They ultimately found the volume to "still [be] an engaging read", with its format adapted the same way as So I'm a Spider, So What? and That Time I Got Reincarnated as a Slime. Loveridge further included the protagonist's "Death By Vending Machine" on her list of the "7 Strangest Isekai Deaths".

== See also ==
- Is It Wrong to Try to Pick Up Girls in a Dungeon?, the manga adaptation of which is also illustrated by Kunieda
