= Boyd Chanda =

Zambian footballer (born 1988)

Personal information
- Date of birth: 19 April 1988 (age 38)
- Position: Striker

Senior career*
Years	Team	Apps	(Gls)
2003–2005	Nchanga Rangers		
2006	CAPS United		
2006–2013	Nchanga Rangers		
2014	Konkola Mine Police		
2015	Indeni		

International career
2005	Zambia	1	(0)
- * Club domestic league appearances and goals

Boyd Chanda (born 19 April 1988) is a retired Zambian football striker.
