= Dropkick on My Devil! =

Japanese manga series by Yukiwo

- First tankōbon volume cover, featuring Yurine Hanazono (above) and Jashin (below)

邪神ちゃんドロップキック (Jashin-chan Doroppukikku)
- Genre: Comedy; Supernatural
- Manga
- Written by: Yukiwo
- Published by: Flex Comix
- Magazine: Comic Meteor
- Original run: April 25, 2012 – present
- Volumes: 27
- Anime television series
- Directed by: Hikaru Sato
- Written by: Kazuyuki Fudeyasu; Momoko Murakami
- Music by: Yuuki Kurihara; Yuzuru Jinma
- Studio: Nomad
- Licensed by: Amazon Prime Video (streaming; former); Crunchyroll (current)
- Original network: BS Fuji, Tokyo MX, Sun TV, CTC, GYT, MTV, RNC, AT-X
- Original run: July 10, 2018 – September 18, 2018
- Episodes: 12
- Anime television series

Dropkick on My Devil!! Dash
- Directed by: Hikaru Sato (chief); Takanori Yano
- Written by: Kazuyuki Fudeyasu; Momoko Murakami
- Music by: Yuuki Kurihara; Yuzuru Jinma
- Studio: Nomad
- Licensed by: Crunchyroll
- Original network: AT-X, Tokyo MX, GYT, Sun TV, UHB
- Original run: April 6, 2020 – June 22, 2020
- Episodes: 11 + 1 special
- Anime television series

Dropkick on My Devil!!! X
- Directed by: Hikaru Sato (chief); Taku Yamada
- Written by: Kazuyuki Fudeyasu; Momoko Murakami
- Music by: Supa Love
- Studio: Nomad
- Licensed by: Crunchyroll
- Original network: TV Tokyo, UHB, BS NTV, BS Fuji, AT-X, KTN
- Original run: July 6, 2022 – September 21, 2022
- Episodes: 12
- Anime television film

Dropkick on My Devil!: Apocalypse Day
- Directed by: Daishou Miyagi
- Produced by: Yuta Chikamori
- Written by: Momoko Murakami
- Studio: Makaria (Note: Animation production assistance (アニメーション制作協力) provided by Luminas.)
- Original network: BS NTV
- Released: December 27, 2023
- Runtime: 23 minutes
- icon

Dropkick on My Devil! (Japanese: 邪神ちゃんドロップキック, Hepburn: Jashin-chan Doroppukikku) is a Japanese manga series written and illustrated by Yukiwo. The series began serialization in Flex Comix's Comic Meteor web magazine in April 2012. Its chapters have been collected in 27 tankōbon volumes as of June 2026. An anime television series adaptation by Nomad aired from July to September 2018, with an additional episode streamed online in October 2018. A second season aired from April to June 2020, and a third season aired from July to September 2022. An anime television special, titled Dropkick on My Devil! Apocalypse Arc premiered in December 2023.

== Plot ==
A human witch and college student named Yurine Hanazono summons the Lamaia Jashin ("Evil God") from Hell. Unable to go back to Hell by herself, Jashin spends each day unsuccessfully trying to kill Yurine while simultaneously spending time with her and various acquaintances from Heaven and Hell.

== Characters ==
Yurine Hanazono (花園 ゆりね, Hanazono Yurine)
Voiced by: Nichika Ōmori
A human and aspiring witch who summoned Jashin to Earth. She is relentless in brutally attacking Jashin as penance for her actions, but is generally kind to others. As the only human among the main characters, Yurine often acts as the voice of reason and avatar of the audience, sarcastically commenting on the silly antics of the characters surrounding her.
Jashin-chan (邪神ちゃん)
Voiced by: Aina Suzuki
A self-centered Lamaia who was summoned from Hell by Yurine. She possesses regenerative abilities, which allows her to recover from whatever bloody punishment Yurine inflicts. Although it seems that Jashin is an absolutely immoral girl who manipulates Medusa or mocks Pekola without any regrets, at heart she is capable of good deeds and appreciates her close friends. However, as Yurine notes, Jashin is embarrassed by this and tries to hide the good traits of her personality because of her tsundere nature.
Medusa (メデューサ, Medyūsa)
Voiced by: Miyu Kubota
A Gorgon from Hell who is close friends with Jashin, despite the latter seeing her more as a walking cash machine. She and Jashin are pretty close, to such a level that their relationship leaves Yurine a feel of a "boy-girl relationship", with Jashin often behaving like an immoral husband who constantly manipulates her "wife" Medusa for the sake of monetary gain. At the same time, the tender side of Medusa allows her to discover the hidden good side of Jashin, which allows them to remain closest persons and regularly emphasize their strong bonds and interdependence. While outdoors, she wears a paper bag on her head to avoid accidentally turning people into stone.
Pekola (ぺこら, Pekora)
Voiced by: Yurie Kozakai
An angel who lost her halo and became stranded on Earth. She is often starved due to not having any money, but is also somewhat defiant in accepting kindness from Yurine, as she believes her to be a witch. She is later on teased, often being called "Tajiri" with people assuming that as her last name, as it is the name on the swimsuit she borrows from her coworker.
Minos (ミノス, Minosu)
Voiced by: Chiaki Omigawa
A female Minotaur who delivers milk and is friends with Jashin and lives next to Yurie's apartment. Despite being based on a cow, she has no qualms about eating beef.
Poporon (ぽぽろん)
Voiced by: Rico Sasaki
Pekola's former subordinate, who seeks to kill Pekola so she can take her place as a fully-fledged angel. However, she loses her powers after Jashin eats her halo, taking up jobs as both a ramen shop worker and an idol.
Persephone II (ペルセポネ2世, Perusepone Ni-sei)
Voiced by: Riho Iida
A devil who descended to the Earth in order to search for Jashin-chan. A running gag is that she and Jashin-chan had been nearby each other several times but never noticed each other's presence. She is the daughter of the Underworld God, Hades and Persephone. She later lives with Minos.
Persephone (ペルセポネ, Perusepone)
Voiced by: Misae Komori
Jashin-chan's teacher and mother of Persephone II who stays on Earth to study human culture. She currently works at an orphanage.
Mei Tachibana (橘 芽依, Tachibana Mei)
Voiced by: Natsuko Hara
A ditzy police officer who falls for Jashin on sight and tries to take her for herself. She refers to Jashin as "Orochimaru" and often brings anything she considers cute to her home.
Yusa (遊佐)
Voiced by: Kazusa Aranami
A yuki-onna who looks after her younger sister, Koji, and sells shaved ice.
Kōji (浩二)
Voiced by: Miko Terada
Yusa's little sister, who Jashin nicknames Kōri-chan (氷ちゃん). Her blood produces strawberry flavored syrup while her urine produces lemon flavored syrup. She has the face of a mole, can't speak, and has been abducted by Mei multiple times.
Beth (ベート, Bēto)
Voiced by: M.A.O
A Beast of Gévaudan that Yurine keeps as a pet outside of her apartment.
Pino (ぴの)
Voiced by: Marina Yamada
Another of Pekola's former subordinates, who seeks to kill Pekola and Poporon due to their acquaintance with demons. However, she loses her powers after Poporon breaks her halo. She takes up a job as the custodian outside Yurine's apartment since the demon residents would prevent the Heaven from pursuing her. She is extremely paranoid.
Kyon-Kyon (キョンキョン, Kyonkyon)
Voiced by: Nanami Yamashita
A Jiangshi girl from Hell China who wishes to become a human. She works at a bookstore.
Ran-Ran (ランラン, Ranran)
Voiced by: Minami Tanaka
Kyon-Kyon's sister who was turned into a giant panda and now resides in Kyon-Kyon's dress, though she's able to leave it.
Lierre (リエール, Riēru)
Voiced by: Miharu Hanai
Pekola, Poporon and Pino's superior who arrives at Earth in order to destroy the human civilization after a meeting with other gods. She takes the form of a child and resides in the orphanage where her old friend Persephone works. She also expresses some childlike traits, such as being obsessed with cartoons or interested in a panda-shaped spring rider.
Devil A (悪魔A, Akuma A)
Voiced by: Kōji Yusa
A Baphomet-type character and the narrator in the anime.
Ecute (エキュート)
Voiced by: Ruri Asano
A vampire and the spoiled princess of Hell Transylvania.
Atre (アトレ, Atore)
Voiced by: Rena Hasegawa
Ecute's educator who becomes very aggressive when enraged.
Hatsune Miku (初音ミク)
Voiced by: Saki Fujita
A guest character which appears regularly during the third season.
Patra-chan (パトラちゃん, Patora-chan)
Within the universe of Dropkick on My Devil!, Patra-chan is a popular fictional character who appears in form of various merchandise items, like collectible figurines depicting her in distress. Lierre, among other characters, is very fond of her. Patra-chan (full name Cleopatra) is the young princess of the planet Ptolemy, who is trying her best to conquer planet Earth. At her side is her always faithful and motivating companion Horus, a small round bird, wearing a sash with changing slogans. Patra's world conquering ambitions, however, have been thwarted by the sisters Noah and Reah, who, out of pity, took Patra in. Patra's clothes are inspired by ancient Egyptian attire. Patra-chan received her own two-volume spin-off manga, titled Uchū Pharaoh Patra-chan (宇宙ファラオ☆パトラちゃん, Uchū Farao Patora-chan; lit. 'Space Pharao Patra-chan').

== Media ==
=== Manga ===
Written and illustrated by Yukiwo, Dropkick on My Devil! began serialization in Flex Comix's Comic Meteor web magazine on April 25, 2012. Twenty-seven volumes have been released as of June 15, 2026. The 148th chapter of the manga was removed from Comic Meteor on May 29, 2019, due to a knife attack on a train that happened in Japan a day earlier. A spin-off manga by Shushu Yuki, titled Minos no Beef 100% (ミノスのビーフ100%), was published as a one-shot manga on August 29, 2018, and later received a serialization from May 15, 2019. The series was compiled into one tankobon volume on April 9, 2020.

==== Volumes ====
No.	Japanese release date	Japanese ISBN
1	May 12, 2014	978-4-86675-886-2
2	June 12, 2014	978-4-86675-888-6
3	December 12, 2014	978-4-86675-895-4
4	June 12, 2015	978-4-86675-902-9
5	December 12, 2015	978-4-86675-909-8
6	June 11, 2016	978-4-86675-916-6
7	December 12, 2016	978-4-86675-925-8
8	June 12, 2017	978-4-86675-934-0
9	December 12, 2017	978-4-86675-945-6
10	June 12, 2018	978-4-86675-015-6
11	August 9, 2018	978-4-86675-022-4
12	April 12, 2019	978-4-86675-050-7
13	October 12, 2019	978-4-86675-079-8
14	April 11, 2020	978-4-86675-103-0
15	June 12, 2020	978-4-86675-111-5
16	December 11, 2020	978-4-86675-131-3
17	June 11, 2021	978-4-86675-152-8
18	December 10, 2021	978-4-86675-180-1
19	June 10, 2022	978-4-86675-223-5
20	December 12, 2022	978-4-86675-256-3
21	May 12, 2023	978-4-86675-286-0
22	December 12, 2023	978-4-86675-326-3
23	June 12, 2024	978-4-86675-358-4
24	December 12, 2024	978-4-86675-396-6
25	June 13, 2025	978-4-86675-440-6
26	December 15, 2025	978-4-86675-471-0
27	June 15, 2026	978-4-86675-510-6

=== Anime ===
An anime television series adaptation by Nomad aired for 11 episodes on BS Fuji from July 9 to September 17, 2018, and was streamed internationally on Amazon Prime Video. (Note: BS-Fuji listed the series air dates on Monday at 24:00, which is effectively Tuesday at midnight JST.) It became available on Crunchyroll on June 13, 2023. A bonus episode was streamed exclusively on Prime Video on October 1, 2018. Hikaru Sato directed the series, Kazuyuki Fudeyasu oversaw the series scripts, and also wrote the scripts alongside Momoko Murakami. Makoto Koga served as both character designer and chief animation director, and Yuki Kurihara and Yuzuru Jinma composed the music. The opening theme song "Ano Ko ni Dropkick" (あの娘にドロップキック; "Dropkick to that Girl") was performed by Aina Suzuki, Nichika Ōmori, Miyu Kubota, Yurie Kozakai, Chiaki Omigawa, Rico Sasaki, and Riho Iida as their respective characters, while the ending theme song "Home Sweet Home" was performed by Yutaro Miura. A twelfth episode premiered in mid-November 2019.

A second season was greenlit for production after the first season managed to sell over 2,000 Blu-ray and DVD copies. The second season, titled Dropkick on My Devil!! Dash, premiered on April 6, 2020, with Amazon Prime Video releasing all 11 episodes in Japan on the same day, while AT-X, Tokyo MX, Tochigi TV, Sun TV, and Hokkaido Cultural Broadcasting aired the episodes weekly until June 22 of the same year. Crunchyroll streamed the second season worldwide excluding Asia. The opening theme song "Toki Toshite Violence" (時としてバイオレンス; "Violence on Occasion") was performed by Halca, while the ending theme song "Love Satisfaction" was performed by Zamb.

A crowdfunding event for a third season started on September 30, 2020. It was announced that if the fundraising goal was met, the third season "will take more than a year to produce" and the production committee "aimed to broadcast the third season in 2022". The crowdfunding goal was reached in 33 hours, so the production of the third season was officially greenlit. The season, titled Dropkick on My Devil!!! X, aired from July 6 to September 21, 2022. (Note: TV Tokyo listed the series premiere at 26:05 on July 5, 2022, which is effectively 2:05 a.m. JST on July 6.) Taku Yamada joined Hikaru Sato as director, while Supa Love composed the music. The opening theme song "Are Kore Drastic" (あれこれドラスティック) was performed by Halca featuring Aina Suzuki. VTuber KAF and virtual singer Kafu performed the ending theme "Ryūsenkei May Day" (流線形メーデー).

An anime television special, titled Dropkick on My Devil!: Apocalypse Day was announced on May 5, 2023. The special is animated by Makaria and premiered on BS NTV on December 26, 2023. Crunchyroll streamed the special.

==== Season 1 ====
No.	Title	Original release date
1	"Episode 1"	July 10, 2018
Yurine Hanazono, a witch who summoned the serpent woman Jashin from Hell, holds a hot pot party for Medusa the gorgon, Minos the minotaur, and Pekola the angel. However, Jashin causes the problem and cannot return home unless she kills Yurine.
2	"Episode 2"	July 17, 2018
On a hot day, Jashin calls upon the ice demon Kōri to cool down Yurine's apartment. Later, Yurine tries to help out Pekola as she struggles without her halo.
3	"Episode 3"	July 24, 2018
In the run up to Christmas, Pekola's fortune is thrown into doubt when Jashin starts targeting what little food she has. Yusa, Kōri's older sister, comes over to question Jashin's treatment of her. Later, it becomes apparent that Jashin is friends with Medusa due to her constantly giving her money.
4	"Episode 4"	July 31, 2018
While stealing a rare gashapon toy from a young boy, Jashin is arrested by self-proclaimed super cop Mei Tachibana, who develops an obsessive attraction to her. Later, Medusa becomes angry at Jashin when one of her pranks goes too far.
5	"Episode 5"	August 7, 2018
Pekola's hesitation in accepting food from Yurine once again leads to a conflict with a greedy Jashin. Jashin gets into a fight with Minos while Mei tries to take a fried chicken mascot for herself. Pekola struggles through her part-time job before finding her house destroyed by a drunken Jashin.
6	"Episode 6"	August 14, 2018
While making curry, Jashin accidentally sends herself back in time and comes across younger versions of herself, Medusa, and Minos. Upon seeing Yusa and Kori set up a shaved ice stand, Jashin tries to compete with her own stand. Pekola is approached by her former apprentice Poporon, who attempts to kill her so she can take her place as a full angel. However, she is unexpectedly saved by Jashin when Poporon knocks over the curry she made and angers her.
7	"Episode 7"	August 21, 2018
Poporon attempts to get her revenge on Jashin, only to get her halo eaten by her and lose her angelic powers. Afterwards, Jashin becomes upset when she learns Medusa apparently has a friend besides her, only to realise it was a cover story Medusa came up with while working to earn more money for her. Later, Jashin grows legs after drinking a potion from Hell and goes on a date with Medusa, who is wearing contacts to block off her petrification ability. However, upon discovering Medusa's contacts have an unfortunate side effect, Jashin gets vengeance on the dealer who sold them to her.
8	"Episode 8"	August 28, 2018
Jashin repeatedly ends up blowing all of her grocery money on pachinko machines. With Poporon stuck on Earth until her halo regenerates, Pekola proposes that they work together to survive, but is ignored. Later, Yurine takes pity on a little ogre that was called over for Setsubun, while Jashin shares some food with Pekola. Afterwards, Yurine gets upset at Jashin for spending all of Medusa's money on games.
9	"Episode 9"	September 4, 2018
Jashin and Medusa get caught up in the middle of a bank robbery, while Minos goes about her busy daily life. Later, Jashin finds Poporon working at a ramen restaurant before accidentally eating Yurine's pudding. That night, Jashin has a nightmare about being chased by zombies.
10	"Episode 10"	September 11, 2018
Pekola accidentally drops all of her earnings into a charity box, only later learning that she was scammed. Yusa and Kori ask Yurine to test our their new flavor of ice cream. Pekola ends up taking on a job as a bodyguard for Poporon, who is now working as an idol, having to protect her from an angry fan. Medusa asks Jashin to teach her how to make chocolates for Valentine's Day.
11	"Episode 11"	September 18, 2018
When Yurine comes down with a fever, Jashin, despite having an opportunity to kill her, ends up getting everyone's help to treat her. The girls discuss the different lifespans between humans and demons before holding a flower viewing party. Later, Jashin gets up to mischief at a bakery before Yurine persuades her to redeem herself, only to end up getting carried away by a balloon into space.
12	"Episode 12"	October 1, 2018 (Note: Premiered on Amazon Prime Video.)
Upon returning from space, Jashin becomes concerned about how big Yurine's pet Beth is growing. Later, Yurine invites everyone on a trip to a private beach, including another demon named Persephone II. Jashin ends up getting ensnared by a Kraken, prompting a reluctant rescue effort from the others. Determined to get revenge on Yurine, Jashin equips some Amazoness armor only for Yurine to summon a fully bowered Beth against her, after which everyone just enjoys a barbecue together.

==== Season 2 ====
No.	Title	Original release date (Note: While all the episodes were released on Amazon Prime Video on April 6, 2020, the table lists the television broadcast dates.)
1	"Episode 1"	April 6, 2020
One day, Jashin remembered the day she was summoned to Yurine Hanazono. As long as Yurine is alive, she cannot return to the makai. So, Jashin writes Yurine's name on "Noto", and this time she tries to decide the drop kick to Yuri. On the other hand, in front of Pekola and Poporon, a former subordinate's pit appears. Pekola is pleased that the Lord has finally picked them up, but the weapon was held in Pino's hand.
2	"Episode 2"	April 13, 2020
Jashin found herself being fueled by "kuz" and "patincus" on SNS, and she was trembling with humiliation. Then, Jashin took the item "1000 2000 drop" of the makai which was able to know where the man of the purpose was when it was noted from Medusa, and headed for revenge to the world. At the same time, Pekola who was attacked by Pino asks for help from Jashin, but Jashin is away.
3	"Episode 3"	April 20, 2020
Yusa, the ice devil, came to Yurine with Jashin. Yusa pleads for her sister, Koji, to look for her because she is missing. Jashin reluctantly called Mei to tell him about Ice's characteristics and asked her to search, but in fact, Ice was brought into Mei's house. Mei is considering how to preserve formalin pickles, taxidermy, mummies, etc. in order to add cute and irresistible ice to his collection.
4	"Episode 4"	April 27, 2020
Yurine confesses that she once wrote "dictator" in a composition about "future me". I want to destroy anything that is against me and create a "Yurine Kingdom" that gathers only those who pledge allegiance. When I found out that Persephone II was thinking, Jashin was shaken by fear and tries to get rid of Yurine. Another day, the group came to swim in the sea with a private beach ticket that was again awarded by Fukudome in the shopping street. And Jashin in the swimsuit had legs again.
5	"Episode 5"	May 4, 2020
Jashin, who smelled the pouch of the appendix of the magazine that Yurine had bought, remembered her childhood memories of spending thousands of years ago with Medusa and Minos. Medusa used the pouch of the 100 yen shop that Jashin bought as a contact bag. However, classmates' goblins were ridiculed as "cheap and smelly". Jashin who saw Medusa crying by one person trembles with anger.
6	"Episode 6"	May 11, 2020
Poporon, who sang and danced as an idol "Noser" on a glittering stage, used Pekola in the dressing room like a lower me. Poporon says that he invited Persephone II, the daughter of Hades, king of the underworld, to perform because he pretended to be good friends, made him watch out, and obliterated him. Meanwhile, Kyon-Kyon tries to find the mother of a lost girl, but is cold and hurt by the mother she finds. Ran-Ran gently encouraged such Kyon-Kyon.
7	"Episode 7"	May 18, 2020
One day, Pino made the most of his skills in the Tenkai Sweets Making Contest Grand Prix, handmade apple pie, and brought a hem to Yurine with Jashin. Just as Jashin was making cheesecake by hand, she was surprised at the deliciousness of the bite and burned her rivalry. On the other hand, Jashin knew that something like garbage could be sold on the flea market app, and when she listed real garbage as a trial, it was successful. She collects the garbage bags from the city.
8	"Episode 8"	May 25, 2020
Because Medusa and her little friends were absent at the Makai festival, Jashin remembered her elementary school days thousands of years ago while chewing on loneliness. Minos, who had just transferred, had distanced herself from her classmates because she looked ferocious, but Jashin called out with Medusa to play with her, and she quickly broke down. But now, Jashin-chan cannot return to the makai, and she is all alone. At the curry shop, she was filled with loneliness so that she could see the illusions of Minos and Medusa.
9	"Episode 9"	June 1, 2020
For horse racing, Jashin borrowed 100,000 yen from Medusa, but by the day before, he had already 40,000 yen, and he had 10,000 yen left. Jashin loses 10,000 yen she got from Medusa at pachinko, but on her way out she encounters Kyon-Kyon and gives her some strawberry milk candy to see if it's poisonous, but it turns Ran-Ran back into her original form. Jashin asks them to thank her by giving her 100,000 yen, and they start to before Ran-Ran turns back into a panda, although disappointed, they now have hope that they can find the end to the curse somewhere in the human realm. Back at home later, Jashin discovers that Yurine actually has volume 2 of the grimoire, so can she finally return home.
10	"Episode 10"	June 8, 2020
Jashin calls over Medusa and Minos, and confronts Yurine about why she has been hiding the book from her. The devils believe it to be because Yurine wanted Jashin to stay with her, but Yurine explains it was only because it does not actually have the return spell in it, as it is in another book. Kyon-Kyon comes over later and explains the backstory of Ran-Ran's curse. Later on the devils and Yurine have a snowball fight, then everyone shows up to join the fun!
11	"Episode 11"	June 15, 2020
Akihabara has become one of the largest otaku cities in the world, becoming a city of electricity from the black market after World War II. About 1km to the west of the town, there was the world's largest bookstore district and an apartment where Jashin-chan lived. From the day she was suddenly summoned from the makai, Jashin missed the irreplaceable days of tears and laughter that ran through with Yurie. It was Jashin-chan who tried to go to pachinko, but I remembered that there was a song that lasted about 10 minutes.
12	"Chapter Chitose"	June 22, 2020
Yurine, attracted by the sweets on the tourist posters on the travel agency, came to Chitose City, Hokkaido with Jashin. Nature spreading in front of her. Jashin, who enjoyed the Kiusu Zhoutsumi Tombs and Chitose Aquarium, encounters a deer with a strong eye near Lake Shikotsu. And the next moment, the deer eats a hot spring inn accommodation ticket with a private open-air bath that Yurine was looking forward to. In addition, The Angels' Lord Lierre descended to find the traitor.

==== Season 3 ====
No.	Title	Original release date
1	"Armageddon Karuta X"; Transliteration: "Harumagedon Karuta X" (ハルマゲドンかるたX)	July 6, 2022
2	"All the Pills are Hard Candies"; Transliteration: "Jōzai wa Subete Ramune Desu" (錠剤は全てラムネです)	July 13, 2022
3	"The Deadly Party Whistle"; Transliteration: "Hissatsu Piropiro" (必殺ピロピロ)	July 20, 2022
4	"How to Spend Evil Time in Jinbocho"; Transliteration: "Yokoshimana Jinbōchō no Sugoshikata" (邪な神保町の過ごし方)	July 27, 2022
5	"To Love and Be Loved by Thirty Million"; Transliteration: "Aishi Aisare 3000 Man" (愛し愛され3000万)	August 3, 2022
6	"Gilding Kamuy: Kushiro"; Transliteration: "Girutingu Kamui Kushiro" (ギルティングカムイ釧路)	August 10, 2022
7	"The Shape of a Smile: What I Found in Obihiro"; Transliteration: "Egao no Katachi, Obihiro de Mitsuketa Mono" (笑顔の形、帯広で見つけたもの)	August 17, 2022
8	"Riding a Dolphin into Chaos"; Transliteration: "Iruka ni Notte Ōsawagi! Harahara Dokidoki Minamishimabara" (イルカにノって大騒ぎ！ハラハラドキドキ南島原!)	August 24, 2022
9	"Lavender-Colored Eyes Misting Over in Furano"; Transliteration: "Furano ni Urumu Rabendā-iro no Hitomi" (富良野に潤むラベンダー色の瞳)	August 31, 2022
10	"Ask the Sky! My Name is Jashin-chan!"; Transliteration: "Ōzora ni Kike! Watashi no na wa Jashin-chan Desu no!" (大空に聞け！私の名は邪神ちゃんですの！)	September 7, 2022
11	"The Jinbocho Blood Donation Center"; Transliteration: "Jinbōchō Kenketsu Sentā" (神保町献血センター)	September 14, 2022
12	"Dropkick Forever"; Transliteration: "Doroppukikku wa Eien ni" (ドロップキックは永遠に)	September 21, 2022

== Controversy ==
On November 16, 2022, the Furano City Council's Special Committee for the Examination of Settlement of Accounts voted to deny the release of funds raised through the hometown tax system for the production of the ninth episode of season three. The episode, which is set in Furano and promotes various local landmarks, businesses, and goods, was criticized by committee members for its plot involving Jashin-chan planning to sell her organs to pay her debts, with one member calling the episode's content "socially unacceptable". The committee had voted 7 to 7 on whether to settle the funding account, with the chairman having the deciding vote, thus denying to hand over the JP¥33 million (US$236,116) in funds to the production committee. On November 30, the committee reversed its decision in a regular session, allowing the funds to be paid out.
