= Seven Senses of the Reunion =

Japanese light novel and anime series

- First light novel volume cover featuring the character Asahi Kuga

七星のスバル (Shichisei no Subaru)
- Genre: Fantasy
- Light novel
- Written by: Noritake Tao
- Illustrated by: Booota
- Published by: Shogakukan
- Imprint: Gagaga Bunko
- Original run: August 18, 2015 – September 19, 2018
- Volumes: 8
- Anime television series
- Directed by: Yoshihito Nishōji
- Produced by: Junichirō Tanaka; Takayuki Takagi; Shiho Miura; Takaaki Nakanome; Manabu Yokoyama
- Written by: Takao Yoshioka
- Music by: Hisakuni; Kaoru Ōtsuka; Takuma Sogi; Tak Miyazawa
- Studio: Lerche
- Licensed by: Amazon Prime Video (streaming; expired); Sentai Filmworks (home video)
- Original network: TBS, BS-TBS
- Original run: July 6, 2018 – September 21, 2018
- Episodes: 12

Seven Senses of the Reunion (Japanese: 七星のスバル, Hepburn: Shichisei no Subaru; lit. "Subaru of the Seven Stars") is a Japanese light novel series written by Noritake Tao and illustrated by Booota. The series was published by Shogakukan under their Gagaga Bunko imprint between August 18, 2015, and September 19, 2018, with eight compiled volumes. An anime television series adaptation by Lerche aired from July to September 2018.

== Plot ==
In 2034, in the globally popular MMORPG Union, there was once a top group of legends named Subaru, made of six elementary school friends. However, once one of their members died of a heart attack presumably brought on from dying in the game, Union shut down the game. In 2040, a new game called Re'Union is launched, with similar mechanics, and when Haruto, one of Subaru's original members, meets Asahi, his partner who died six years before, the members of Subaru gather once again to uncover the mystery behind it.

== Characters ==
=== Member of Subaru Guild ===
Haruto Amō (天羽 陽翔, Amō Haruto)
Voiced by: Kengo Takanashi
Haruto is a Fighter and was the leader of guild Subaru. An optimist during his childhood, he has lived a hollow life after Asahi's death six years ago. His Sense is "Fighting Spirit" (闘気, Tōki) which allows him to manipulate the aura of both offense and defense inside him.
Asahi Kuga (空閑 旭姫, Kuga Asahi)
Voiced by: Nichika Ōmori
Asahi is a rear guard member of Subaru who is always seen with smile on her face. She died from heart failure right after her in-game character dies, leading to the closure of Union. Her Sense is the prophet art which allows her to choose a future from millions of possible outcomes.
Satsuki Usui (碓氷 咲月, Usui Satsuki)
Voiced by: Akari Kitō
Satsuki is a mage of Subaru who has feelings for Haruto and often tries to convey them to him but her attempts go unnoticed. She is good friend's with Asahi but was jealous of her close association with Haruto. In episode 9, she confesses her affections for him and tells him to come up with a decision by the time for a dance. Haruto appeared and apologized as she realized he has chosen Asahi and isn't too surprised.
Takanori Mikado (御門 貴法, Mikado Takanori)
Voiced by: Kaito Ishikawa
The sub leader of Subaru who has feelings for Asahi. While Takanori is intelligent, like Haruto he was oblivious to the affections of his friend Nozomi and was shocked that he never noticed her behavior.
Clive Vivali (クライヴ = ヴィヴァリー, Kuraivu Vivari)
Voiced by: Takuma Terashima
The only foreign member of Subaru.
Nozomi Kusaka (日下 希, Kusuka Nozomi)
Voiced by: Yumiri Hanamori
A shy and introverted girl of Subaru who has feelings for Takanori. When Satsuki and Haruto find her, they caught up and she was informed Asahi was alive in the game but didn't believe it and refused to play the game since she stopped doing so. She later played and found Takanori dancing with Satsuki and believed they were now a couple, which devastated her to the point where she joined evil mages. Nozomi became so unhinged and disturbed that she cursed Asahi after seeing she was alive. In episode 11, she fights Takanori who confronted her alone before informing her of the misunderstanding that he and Satsuki were rejected by Asahi and Haruto respectively and were comforted each other. Nozomi felt guilt at her mistake and the deeds she had done, as Takanori cured her while apologizing for not acknowledging her and promising to do so now.
Elicia (エリシア, Erishia)
Voiced by: Chika Anzai
A mysterious girl who appears before Subaru members and seems to know about Asahi's appearance in Re'Union. Elicia is later revealed to be the seventh member of Subaru, in episode 12, which also discusses why there are Seven Stars on Pleiades.

== Media ==
=== Light novels ===
The light novel series is written by Noritake Tao and illustrated by Booota. It is being published by Shogakukan under their Gagaga Bunko imprint. The first volume was published on August 18, 2015. As of September 19, 2018, eight volumes have been released.

No.	Release date	ISBN
1	August 18, 2015	978-4-09-451566-4
2	December 18, 2015	978-4-09-451584-8
3	May 18, 2016	978-4-09-451609-8
4	October 18, 2016	978-4-09-451637-1
5	March 17, 2017	978-4-09-451663-0
6	September 20, 2017	978-4-09-451699-9
EX	June 19, 2018	978-4-09-451736-1
7	September 19, 2018	978-4-09-451751-4

=== Anime ===
An anime television series adaptation by Lerche aired from July 6 to September 21, 2018, on TBS. (Note: The show listed it at July 5, 2018 at 25:58; which is at 1:58 A.M. on July 6, 2018.) The anime is directed by Yoshihito Nishōji, with Takao Yoshioka in charge of series composition and Yumiko Yamamoto as the character designer. The opening theme is 360° Hoshi no Orchestra" (360°星のオーケストラ, 360° Star Orchestra) by petit milady, and the ending theme is "Starlight" by Erii Yamazaki. The series ran for 12 episodes.

No.	Title (Note: All English titles are taken from Amazon Video.)	Original release date
1	"Reunion and Restart" "Saikai to Saikai" (再会と再開)	July 6, 2018
Haruto Amō leads his six-member guild consisting of elementary school friends called Subaru on a quest in the MMORPG game Union. When encountering the dungeon boss, Asahi Kuga is killed in the game protecting Haruto. Asahi subsequently dies from heart failure in the real world, resulting in the game being shut down. Six years later, the game is relaunched, now called Re'Union, with only invited players allowed to play the game. Haruto is one of the invited players, and after clearing a dungeon he is surprised to find Asahi sleeping inside a treasure chest.
2	"Untold Feelings" "Himetaru omoi" (秘めたる想い)	July 13, 2018
Having conversation with Asahi, Haruto realizes that Asahi still thinks it is the day of the failed quest six years ago and finds out that she cannot log out of the game. A rival guild from the original game attacks Haruto and she activates her Sense that allows Haruto to predict his opponent's movements to beat him as while Haruto doesn't have his, Asahi still has hers. Former Subaru guild member Takanori Mikado arrives with his new guild Illuminati to defeat the guild. Sometime after logging out, Satsuki Usui comes over to visit Haruto and tells him that he needs to face the past as he had been running away from it. Back in the game, Haruto and Satsuki meet in-game and journey together. Haruto then goes out to a cave and meets Elicia, who appears to know about Asahi and warns Haruto that he is being targeted.
3	"The Promise" "Me no Hi no Yakusoku" (めの日の約束)	July 20, 2018
Out of jealousy, Satsuki asks Asahi to stay away from Haruto after telling her what kind of person he had become, and the ensuing argument leads Haruto to log out. Satsuki visits him to remind her of the promise he made as six years ago the Subaru members exchanged rings. Back in the game, Haruto and Asahi go on an adventure to gather materials for a ring that Haruto gives to Asahi, and Satsuki has one made for herself. The three venture into the dungeon where they had their final quest searching for answers regarding Asahi and encounter the dungeon boss that killed Asahi summoned by Elicia. After struggling, Haruto remembers the promise to Asahi to protect each other, and his Sense awakens to defeat the boss.
4	"Dissonance" "Fukyōwaon" (不協和音)	July 27, 2018
After exiting the cave, an artifact attached to Asahi falls out and Haruto sees visions that are hints as to the truth behind her existence. With the word that they conquered the dungeon becoming widespread, Haruto's party comes under attack by the Southern Cross guild, and then by the Brill Society guild with their leader Angelus asking Haruto to join, but Haruto refuses. The three enter the Tower of Heaven, a dungeon they struggled clearing when they were at low levels, and Satsuki gets immobilized by the dungeon boss leading her to lose her trust of Haruto. After defeating the dungeon boss, they encounter Takanori and his guild, warning him not to get involved with Asahi anymore.
5	"Swirling Conspiracy" "Uzumaku inbō" (渦巻く陰謀)	August 3, 2018
Haruto refuses to back down and prepares to fight Takanori, but Satsuki intervenes. Takanori lets Haruto know that things will never be the same again and as such, he refuses to rejoin Subaru. Haruto goes looking for hints regarding Clive Vivali and Nozomi Kusaka, but are unable to find any trace of them in the game. Takanori decides to merge Illuminati with Southern Cross and Brill Society to form the new guild Divine. Haruto's party gets separated when they encounter a sudden burst of fog, and Asahi gets kidnapped by the members of Divine, who betray Takanori in the process. Haruto escapes the skirmish with help from Elicia, while Satsuki fights her way out. Haruto decides to rescue Asahi himself, and he heads to the place where Asahi is being held captive preparing to battle a large number of Divine members.
6	"The Lion and the Dragon Unite" "Shi Ryuu, Kyoutou" (獅竜、共闘)	August 10, 2018
Satsuki remembers the time she looked down on herself for being too weak, but Asahi comforted her. She approaches Takanori asking him to help Haruto rescue Asahi to protect her happiness. On the battlefield, Haruto takes down several members of Divine, but gets overwhelmed by the number of enemies as Satsuki and Takanori arrive to assist him. The three encounter the Angelus holding Asahi captive. With Haruto and Takanori in trouble, Satsuki awakens her Sense to defeat the guild members leaving only Angelus and the Southern Cross leader, who Angelus turns into a monster. They are easily defeated, and Asahi gets rescued. Through the Prophet Art, the party learns that Asahi is part of a failed experiment. Meanwhile, Clive watches the action from a distance with Elicia, who is plotting something that requires the members of Subaru to awaken their Senses.
7	"Seeking the Sword" "Tsurugi o motomete" (剣を求めて)	August 17, 2018
Haruto, Asahi, and Satsuki go out to sea on the pirate Alwida's ship having been tipped off about a legendary sword somewhere underwater. Haruto locates it and recognizes it as the sword he wielded in Union, but it is guarded by the giant sea dragon Aegir. Struggling to fight underwater, Clive arrives and helps the party retreat. Back in real world, Takanori meets up with Haruto and Satsuki and tells them that a shady organization called Gnosis is plotting something and he believes that they faked Asahi's death. They are also informed that Nozomi has returned to town. Back in the game, Haruto's party tries to retrieve the sword again now aided by Clive's power that allows them to move underwater. They defeat Aegir, but when Haruto retrieves the sword, Clive betrays the party and stabs Haruto.
8	"Future Choice" "Mirai no Sentaku" (末来の選択)	August 24, 2018
Haruto wakes up in an alternative reality created by Asahi's Prophet Art where he wakes up from a six-year coma after his character died instead of Asahi's. Elicia arrives to tell Haruto that Senses can be used in the real world, and that Union was created by Gnosis as a training ground to test out the Senses so that they can create the ultimate Sense. After telling Asahi that this reality is not where he belongs, she sends him back to the moment before Clive stabbed him and blocks the attack. Knowing that Clive would always remain loyal to a friend, Haruto realizes that Clive is a fake. The fake Clive reveals himself as Simon, a member of Gnosis, and merges with Aegir to attack the party. Alwida arrives to assist the party and reveals himself to be the real Clive. Together, they help Haruto retrieve the sword to defeat Aegir. The party gets another strange vision from the red stone fragment they picked up after defeating Aegir where they learn that Elicia tried to lock her Sense, but the red stone containing it shattered and the party believes that the fragment is a piece of that stone.
9	"The Chance Meeting of the Stars" "Meguriau hoshiboshi" (巡り合う星々)	August 31, 2018
Haruto explains what he learned from Elicia about Gnosis and Union to the members of Subaru, and Clive tells everybody that they need to find Nozomi and awaken her Sense. Haruto and Satsuki meet up with Nozomi and are surprised by how much she has changed since they last met. They learn that Nozomi has become a fashion model and has quit playing video games since Asahi's death. Later, Satsuki confesses to Haruto of her affections for him and wants him to make a decision at the dance. That night before the ball inside the game, Haruto and Takanori go to Asahi's grave and have a fight arguing over who protects Asahi. Takanori makes up with Haruto and lets him dance with Asahi at the ball inside the game while Takanori dances with Satsuki, who was rejected by Haruto. After recalling the time in elementary school when Takanori helped her out leading her to having feelings for him, Nozomi logs into Re'Union, and sees Takanori dancing with Satsuki at the ball prompting her to break down. She gets greeted by two Gnosis agents demanding that she joins their organization.
10	"The Girl Who Disappeared" "Kieta shōjo" (消えた少女)	September 7, 2018
Haruto, Satsuki, and Takanori visit Nozomi's home after hearing about her disappearance. Having figured out that she logged into Re'Union when she disappeared, Takanori asks Clive to trace her activity and determine her location in the game. The party heads to that location and gets attacked by her oversized familiars. After defeating the familiars, a brainwashed Nozomi appears, along with her kidnappers from Gnosis Cerinthus and Marcion. The party attacks Cerinthus and Marcion unable to land an attack, and Nozomi places a curse on Asahi forcing the party to retreat. Haruto, Satsuki, and Takanori gather in the real world again where Takanori figures out that Nozomi has a crush on him and seeing him dance with Satsuki led to Gnosis taking advantage of her jealousy. The three then suddenly feel dizzy as they learn that their perceptions have been altered by a Sense.
11	"Creeping Nightmare" "Hai bi yoru akumu" (這いび寄る悪夢)	September 14, 2018
The Gnosis member thanks Subaru for becoming close friends and vanishes prompting Haruto to quickly log back into Re'Union. Asahi awakens from a nightmare while sleeping at the base as Haruto his friends return to the game, and the base gets destroyed forcing the party to evacuate. The party ventures into a dungeon that suddenly appeared, and they notice that Asahi's Sense is malfunctioning. The party encounters Nozomi, Cerinthus, and Marcion in the dungeon, and Takanori decides to deal with Nozomi himself. As Nozomi attacks Takanori, he intentionally does not dodge her attacks in order to reach her. He apologizes for not acknowledging her feelings for him and he embraces her to return Nozomi to normal. Meanwhile, Haruto gets shot by Asahi, who has been acting on her grudge towards him due to the influence of a Sense.
12	"The New Legend" "Arata naru densetsu" (新たなる伝説)	September 21, 2018
With Haruto lying on the ground after being shot by Asahi, the goddess inside Asahi begins to awaken as part of the plan for Cerinthus and Marcion to create their paradise. Amidst the chaos, Cerinthus attacks Clive, but is saved by Elicia. Haruto recalls the time he promised Asahi to get stronger, and he regains consciousness with his Sense powering up. Cerinthus and Marcion make a last ditch attack, but Haruto's powered-up Sense easily defeats them. After the battle, Nozomi makes a new sheath for Haruto's sword with her Sense and Elicia explains why there are seven jewels on it as Subaru is a cluster that appears to have six stars to some and seven to others. The party logs out of the game and Takanori comes over to pick up Nozomi and return her feelings. Some time later, the party logs back in and goes on their first quest as the reunited guild, while the actions of Gnosis become public. In an unresolved cliffhanger, Elicia is revealed to be the seventh member of Subaru.

== Reception ==
=== Previews ===
The anime adaptation's first episode garnered mixed reviews from Anime News Network's staff during the Summer 2018 season previews. Theron Martin praised the execution of the story's familiar gimmick being "handled convincingly" and the overall artwork and animation being "above par" and "above-average" respectively. Paul Jensen was critical of the slow pacing due to the over-explanation of its in-game mechanics but was optimistic of the plot getting better after Asahi's death with a focus on serious topics and character development amongst its cast. Rebecca Silverman commended the tonal whiplashes of the story's "light and dark elements" to show that the characters are playing a fun game but did found it "off-kilter" towards the end as it sets up its overarching plot, concluding with: "I like the designs and the use of color in the art and animation, and the plot is intriguing enough that I'll be giving this a few more episodes to see where it goes." James Beckett felt the cast didn't leave much of an impression to care about them and the Union game itself "coming off as a poor-man's SAO" but was interested in "the core mystery of Asahi's reappearance", saying that: "[I]nciting a modicum of curiosity is a low bar for a premiere to pass, but given how subdued this summer season has felt so far, I'll take what I can get." Nick Creamer was initially unimpressed by the first half's basic illustration of the team's relationships and the battle scenes lacking in excitement but got hooked by the second half's world-building, compelling twist and the "reasonably sharp" production quality being upscaled in the character art and dramatic sequences, concluding that: "If Seven Senses' premise falls within your wheelhouse, I'd definitely give it a shot."

=== Series ===
Martin reviewed the complete anime series and gave it a C+ grade. He commended it for attempting to merge the premises of Anohana and .hack//Sign together for their central mystery and give the cast some relationship problems that culminate in "some respectable drama and [allows for some] good character moments" but criticized the needless inclusion of an unfinished secondary storyline to ramp up tension and the "underwhelming action scenes" not living up to the overall production, concluding that: "Overall, Seven Senses of the Re'Union is a decent series that might have been better if it had kept a narrower focus [...] At least this series does bring its most immediate plot thread to a satisfactory resolution." Allen Moody of THEM Anime Reviews criticized the series for blatantly ripping off Anohana's character archetypes and giving them "insufferable jerkishness (Takanori)" or "cliched personalities (Haruto and Nozomi)", concluding that: "I gather that the series here is the bare opening to a longer saga. But, given that Satsuki is the only person I had much positive feeling toward at all, even if another season appears, I do not expect to visit THIS game's world again."
