= Invaders of the Rokujouma!? =

Japanese light novel series

- First light novel volume cover

六畳間の侵略者!? (Rokujyōma no Shinryakusha)
- Genre: Harem, romantic comedy
- Light novel
- Written by: Takehaya
- Illustrated by: Poco
- Published by: Hobby Japan
- English publisher: NA: J-Novel Club
- Imprint: HJ Bunko
- Original run: March 1, 2009 – present
- Volumes: 50 + 2 side stories
- Manga
- Written by: Takehaya
- Illustrated by: Tomosane Ariike
- Published by: Hobby Japan
- Magazine: Comic Dangan
- Original run: December 20, 2013 – February 16, 2017
- Volumes: 5
- Anime television series
- Directed by: Shin Oonuma; Jin Tamamura
- Produced by: Hayato Kaneko; Masaaki Yokota; Tomomi Kudo
- Written by: Shogo Yasukawa
- Music by: Ryosuke Nakanishi
- Studio: Silver Link
- Licensed by: NA: Sentai Filmworks; UK: MVM Films
- Original network: Tokyo MX, Sun TV, AT-X, BS11
- English network: SEA: Animax Asia
- Original run: July 11, 2014 – September 26, 2014
- Episodes: 12

Invaders of the Rokujouma!? (Japanese: 六畳間の侵略者!?, Hepburn: Rokujōma no Shinryakusha!?; lit. "Invaders of the Six-Tatami Mat Room!?") is a Japanese light novel series written by Takehaya and illustrated by Poco. HJ Bunko has published fifty volumes since 2009 under their HJ Bunko imprint, as well as two side story volumes. A manga adaptation with art by Tomosane Ariike is serialized in Hobby Japan's online seinen manga magazine Comic Dangan. A 12-episode anime television series adaptation by Silver Link aired between July 11 and September 26, 2014.

== Plot ==
Kōtarō Satomi decided to live on his own when he began high school, and chose Room 106 of Corona House because it was cheap. Unfortunately, Kōtarō soon discovers that numerous otherworldly and supernatural girls also want his room for various reasons of their own, and aren't about to back down. As a result, Kōtarō and the girls find themselves forced to live together as they try to settle just who ends up with the room.

== Characters ==
=== Main characters ===
Kōtarō Satomi (里見 孝太郎, Satomi Kōtarō)
Voiced by: Yuichi Nakamura
A high school boy who moves into Room 106 and intends to keep it at all costs due to its unexpectedly cheap 5,000 yen per month rent. After an accident in the archaeology site he works at, he gains the ability to see ghosts and wield ancient artifacts. He usually is seen wearing the replica of the Blue Knight's armor Theia has when fighting, along with using his two swords, Saguratin and later (after Volume 7) Signaltin. While at first not that experienced in sword fighting, he gains a much higher level of skill after he returned from Ancient Forthorthe in the past with Clan (Clariossa Daora Forthorthe) due to all the fighting he did there (explained in Volume 7.5 and 8.5)
Sanae Higashihongan (東本願 早苗, Higashihongan Sanae)
Voiced by: Eri Suzuki
A female ghost who already haunts Room 106. She wants to expel Kōtarō and claim the room as her own. She is able to manipulate solid items and launch them to attack, but her attack is neutralized when near sacred objects. Later, it is revealed that she is actually a soul who has left her body, and the Room 106 residents work together to restore her. She eventually gains her real body back, but still has high levels of spiritual energy as well as having the ability of Astral Projection, that is, to leave her body and project her ghost form at her leisure.
Yurika Nijino (虹野 ゆりか, Nijino Yurika)
Voiced by: Nichika Ōmori
A clumsy and timorous but dutiful magical girl who intends to occupy the room, which contains high levels of magical power, with the intention of defending it from other magical girls who may use such power for evil. She constantly summons magical force fields whenever room 106 residents start engaging each other. Because this often occurs behind the scenes, the other residents of Room 106 refuse to believe that she is a magical girl, instead considering her a mere schoolgirl who loves cosplay and has developed for herself an elaborate backstory. Eventually, her powers are shown to the others but she decides to stop trying to prove herself to be normal.
Kiriha Kurano (クラノ = キリハ, Kurano Kiriha)
Voiced by: Masumi Tazawa
A startlingly buxom descendant of the Earth People, who moved underground during centuries past, and a member of the Kurano clan, a family of oracles and spellmasters. Miss Kurano claims that she needs to rebuild a shrine on this room's location and use the etheric energy gathered by it to generate weapons and launch an invasion against the people on the surface: against Kōtarō's own civilization. It is later revealed that the Kurano clan in fact wants to make peace, and Kiriha is actually doing her best to delay the invasion. She eventually succeeded, as the Kurano clan restored its political power before the invasion can actually take place.
Theiamillis Gre Fortorthe (ティアミリス・グレ・フォルトーゼ, Tiamirisu Gure Forutōze)
Voiced by: Maria Naganawa
While her full name is Theiamillis Gre Mastir Sagurada von Forthorthe, her name is often shortened to Theia. Her unfortunate nickname from Kōtarō is 'Tulip', from her appearance when her lengthy skirt had been swept up over her head. Tulip is an intergalactic alien princess from a planet named Fortorthe and she has a large spacecraft intimidatingly armed with pulse lasers and cannons. Theia is given the task of conquering a spot in intergalactic space in order to prove her worthiness as a successor to the throne. For the first time ever the random spot chosen by the computer was on an inhabited planet, namely Room 106. This means she also must procure the fealty of the inhabitants, i.e Kōtarō. The princess, it turns out, is fond since childhood of a Fortorthe legend known as the Blue Knight, and has named her spaceship and battle armor after him. She later grants the armor to Kōtarō, along with her personal sword, Saguratin.
Ruthkhania Nye Pardomshiha (ルースカニア・ナイ・パルドムシーハ, Rūsukania Nai Parudomushīha)
Voiced by: Saori Hayami
Theia's maidservant and wise counselor, often giving useful advice to her mistress. When the competitors for Room 106 were on a group vacation, an incident occurred where a sleeping Kōtarō holds tightly to Ruth, who lies next to him. Ruth initially was flustered nearly to a panic at what she mistook to be the boy's supposed romantic intentions; however, when she realizes that he has been dreaming and mistaken her for a rare rhinoceros beetle, she flies into a jealous rage whenever she sees a beetle. Ruth wishes for nothing more than the happiness of her childhood friend Princess Theia, and she is often seen supporting her in any way possible, while remaining the most conciliatory and level-headed of the supposed competitors.
Harumi Sakuraba (桜庭 晴海, Sakuraba Harumi)
Voiced by: Megumi Takamoto
Coming from a wealthy family, she is the kind and well-mannered president of the school knitting club and is the only other member besides Kōtarō. Her easy closeness with him is a constant source of jealousy for the girls who are actually living with him, no less because she has feelings for Kōtarō.
Shizuka Kasagi (笠置 静香, Kasagi Shizuka)
Voiced by: Aya Suzaki
Landlady of the Corona House (home of Room 106), qi-using master martial artist, and a high school girl as well. Shizuka is the current host of the Fire Dragon Emperor Alunaya. When his power leaks out, it strengthens Shizuka's already strong body. This is the reason why she was able to overpower all of the invaders the day they met despite their own powers. Even without using Alunaya powers, Shizuka's martial arts skills puts her in the same league as the invader girls. She accepts the need of the Room 106 residents to compete over it, but forces them to keep the competition peaceful and normal. Shizuka is friendly, respectful, and easy to get along with. She is strongly protective of her family's apartment since both of her parents are dead. Along with taking great care of it, she becomes enraged whenever it is damaged; thus, it is she who has drawn up the convention and rules by which all competitors for the room must peaceably abide.

The Satomi Knights (サトミ騎士団, Satomi Kishidan) is a band of knights created by Kōtarō Satomi serving under princess Theiamillis Gre Forthorthe.

Satomi Knights member uniforms were designed somewhat resembling of Kōtarō's armor, but the design in its entirety is closer to a school uniform. The colors were blue and white, based on the Blue Knight and Alaia, and then each person's personal color was added in.

Clariossa Daora Forthorthe (クラリオーサ・ダオラ・フォルトーゼ, Karariosa Daora Forutōze)
Voiced by: Yukari Tamura
Often called Clan, Clariossa Daora Forthorthe is the Second Princess of the Forthorthe Royal family. As such, she is a constant rival and enemy to Theia, even more so given the fact that their families, the Mastir (Theia) and Schweiger (Clan) never got along well in the first place. Originally appearing as an enemy intending to get rid of Theia so as to make her fail her task, but after the events that took place in the past in Forthorthe with Kōtarō (after Volume 7, with the story being explained in Volume 7.5 and 8.5), she becomes quite close with the boy resident of Room 106 and she decides rather to make him her vassal, and starts to care less about the throne. From then on, rather than resorting to underhanded tactics, she decides to fight Theia fair and square for the rights to Throne, while in reality caring much more about simply having and making Kōtarō her vassal.
She is not only intelligent, but also a very creative scientist, having invented herself most of the equipment and weapons she uses.
Aika Maki (藍華真希, Aika Maki)
Voiced by: Akari Kitō
A magical girl part of the organization called Darkness Rainbow, she is an enemy of Yurika, as the two organizations Darkness Rainbow and Rainbow Heart are enemies of each other. Appearing as an enemy, and being the main villain of Volume 5, she later on becomes very friendly with Kōtarō after he saved her life (Volume 8). From then on, she sees Kōtarō not as an enemy, but as a close friend who she does not wish to harm. While still part of Darkness Rainbow, eventually she decides to leave them and live on simply as Aika Maki, and not a member of Darkness Rainbow (Volume 12).

=== Supporting characters ===
Karama (カラマ)
Voiced by: Ayana Taketatsu
One of Kiriha's battle drones.
Korama (コラマ)
Voiced by: Aoi Yūki
Another of Kiriha's battle drones.
Kenji Matsudaira (松平 賢次, Matsudaira Kenji)
Voiced by: Tatsuhisa Suzuki
Kōtarō's friend and classmate who works at the same archaeology site.

== Media ==
=== Light novel ===
The first light novel volume was published on March 1, 2009, by Hobby Japan under their HJ Bunko imprint. As of October 2026, 50 volumes have been published, as well as two side story volumes. Online publisher J-Novel Club have licensed the light novel for an English release. The company planned to release the first 31 volumes of the series (including volumes 7.5 and 8.5) as omnibus paperbacks in 2020. The Kickstarter campaign to do so was successfully funded in only six hours.

No.	Title	Original release date	English release date
1	Rokujyoma ga Ippai Ippai Dai Sōdatsu-sen! (六畳間がいっぱいいっぱい大争奪戦！)	March 1, 2009; 978-4-89425-833-4	June 3, 2017
2	Roku Jōkan Sōdatsusen, Butai wa Taīkusai e! (六畳間争奪戦、舞台は体育祭へ！)	July 1, 2009; 978-4-89425-900-3	June 3, 2017
3	Natsu no Umibe wa Kiken ga Ippai!? (夏の海辺はキケンがいっぱい!?)	November 1, 2009; 978-4-89425-956-0	June 3, 2017
4	Honokana Koi to Rokujouma, Tsuginaru Senjō wa "Bunkasai"! (ほのかな恋と六畳間、次なる戦場は「文化祭」！)	March 1, 2010; 978-4-7986-0007-9	July 3, 2017
5	Yurika ga Mukuwa Reru hi ga Kita! (ゆりかが報われる日が来た！)	June 1, 2010; 978-4-7986-0067-3	August 5, 2017
6	Koi ni! Shinryaku ni!! Chitei Shōjo Kiriha no Shin no Tatakai ga Hajimaru. (恋に！ 侵略に!! 地底少女キリハの真の戦いが始まる。)	October 1, 2010; 978-4-7986-0123-6	September 4, 2017
7	Kurisumasu ni Nani ka ga Okoru!? (クリスマスに何かが起こる!?)	January 14, 2011; 978-4-7986-0181-6	October 3, 2017
7.5	Kieta 2 Nin ga Sōgū Suru Rokujyoma no "Densetsu"! (消えた2人が遭遇する六畳間の「伝説」！)	May 1, 2011; 978-4-7986-0224-0	November 4, 2017
8	Aku no Mahō Shōjo, Sai Shūrai! (悪の魔法少女、再襲来！)	August 1, 2011; 978-4-7986-0263-9	December 5, 2017
8.5	Kōtarō wa "Densetsu" o Saigen Dekiru no Ka!? (孝太郎は「伝説」を再現できるのか!?)	November 1, 2011; 978-4-7986-0307-0	January 4, 2018
9	Kōtarō, Musō!! (コータロー、無双!!)	March 1, 2012; 978-4-7986-0355-1	February 4, 2018
10	Sore wa, ima Kara 10 Nen Mae no Monogatari―― (それは、今から10年前の物語――)	June 1, 2012; 978-4-7986-0411-4	March 4, 2018
11	Higashihongan Sanae. Yūrei. Sono Shōtai ga Dai Pinchi! (東本願早苗。幽霊。その正体が大ピンチ！)	October 1, 2012; 978-4-7986-0474-9	April 4, 2018
12	Ironna Imi de Mahō Shōjo ga Dai Katsuyaku!? (いろんな意味で魔法少女が大活躍!?)	February 1, 2013; 978-4-7986-0537-1	May 4, 2018
13	Tia Kikoku ni Kakusareta Inbō to wa!? (ティア帰国に隠された陰謀とは!?)	May 1, 2013; 978-4-7986-0598-2	June 5, 2018
14	Masaka? Tsuini? Ōya san Kai!! (まさか？ ついに？ 大家さん回!!)	September 1, 2013; 978-4-7986-0665-1	July 4, 2018
15	Teki wa Chiteijin no Kyūshinha! Satomi Kishi-dan, Shutsugeki!! (敵は地底人の急進派！ サトミ騎士団、出撃!!)	March 1, 2014; 978-4-7986-0764-1	August 3, 2018
16	"Rokujyoma" no Sōryoku-sen de, Chitei-hen ni Ketchaku! (『六畳間』の総力戦で、地底編に決着！)	July 1, 2014; 978-4-7986-0836-5	October 4, 2018
17	Natsu no Ibento Tenkomorina Nichijō Kai! (夏のイベントてんこ盛りな日常回！)	October 1, 2014 (Note: Special Edition Light novel release bundled with Drama CD); 978-4-7986-0893-8 (Normal Edition); 978-4-7986-0898-3 (Special Edition)	November 4, 2018
18	Yurika to Maki, Sorezore no Mahō Shōjo no Susumubeki Michi to wa――? (ゆりかと真希、それぞれの魔法少女の進むべき道とは――？)	January 31, 2015; 978-4-7986-0955-3 (Normal Edition); 978-4-7986-0924-9 (Special Edition)	December 3, 2018
19	Tsuini "Tensai" Mahō Shōjo ga Senjō e! (ついに"天才"魔法少女が戦場へ！)	May 29, 2015; 978-4-7986-1026-9	March 3, 2019
20	O Ryōri Batoru Boppatsu! Rokujyoma no Nichijō o Tsuzuru "Herakuresu!"-hen (お料理バトル勃発！六畳間の日常を綴る「へらくれす！」編)	September 1, 2015; 978-4-7986-1071-9 (Normal Edition); 978-4-7986-1059-7 (Special Edition)	April 6, 2019
21	Uchū Kūkan de Dai Abare!? Aratanaru Ao Kishi Densetsu, Kaimaku! (宇宙空間で大暴れ!? 新たなる青騎士伝説、開幕！)	January 1, 2016; 978-4-7986-1151-8 (Normal Edition); 978-4-7986-1059-7 (Special Edition)	May 27, 2019
22	"Ni Sen Nen Mae no Densetsu "to" Genzai (ima)" ga Kasanaru! Ōgon no Hime to Aoki Kishi Dai ni Shō!! ("二千年前の伝説"と"現在（いま）"が重なる！ 黄金の姫と青き騎士 第二章!!)	April 30, 2016; 978-4-7986-1223-2	August 5, 2019
23	Aratana Koigataki, Genru!? Shūgakuryokō de Koi Moyō ni Gekishin! "Herakuresu!-hen" Dai 2 dan!! (新たな恋敵<ライバル>、現る!? 修学旅行で恋模様に激震！「へらくれす！編」第2弾!!)	August 1, 2016; 978-4-7986-1268-3	September 24, 2019
24	Shinsei Forutōze Seikigun, Sai dan! "Kaibutsu " o Uchitaose! (新生フォルトーゼ正規軍、再誕！"怪物"を打ち倒せ！)	November 1, 2016; 978-4-7986-1324-6	September 24, 2019
25	Mitsudomoe no Tatakai o Dashinuku "Ao Kishi" no Gyakuten no Ichi te to wa!? (三つ巴の戦いを出し抜く"青騎士"の逆転の一手とは!?)	February 28, 2017; 978-4-7986-1394-9	September 24, 2019
26	Forutōze no Mirai o Kaketa Tatakai, Tsuini Ketchaku――!! (フォルトーゼの未来を賭けた戦い、ついに決着――!!)	June 30, 2017; 978-4-7986-1477-9	October 29, 2019
27	Ao Kishi, Ryūnen no Kiki!? Hisabisa no Nichijō-hen o o Todoke! (青騎士、留年の危機!? 久々の日常編をお届け！)	October 31, 2017; 978-4-7986-1563-9	October 29, 2019
28	Kōtarō to Shōjotachi o Machiukeru Shiren to wa――? (孝太郎と少女たちを待ち受ける試練とは――？)	February 28, 2018; 978-4-7986-1640-7	October 29, 2019
29	"Rokujyoma no Shinryakusha" Sono Shōtai to wa!? ("六畳間の侵略者"その正体とは!?)	June 26, 2018; 978-4-7986-1724-4	December 26, 2019
30	Aratana Kisetsu o Mukae, "Ano" Kyara-tachi ga Nakamairi! (新たな季節を迎え、"あの"キャラたちが仲間入り！)	October 31, 2018; 978-4-7986-1801-2	December 26, 2019
31	Harumi to Kyū Sekkin!? "Moshimo" no Sekai wa Geki ama Tenkai Mejirōshi! (晴海と急接近!? "もしも"の世界は激甘展開目白押し！)	February 28, 2019; March 1, 2019; 978-4-7986-1882-1 (Normal Edition); 978-4-7986-1871-5 (Special Edition)	December 26, 2019
32	Ni Nenburi no 《Bukatsu Taikō Shōgaibutsu Marason》 de dai Haran!? (2年ぶりの《部活対抗障害物マラソン》で大波乱!?)	July 1, 2019; 978-4-7986-1957-6	September 11, 2020
33	"Kuran to Tsukiatte Mita" Gekikan no if Shirīzu ga Tōjō! ("クランと付き合ってみた"激甘のifシリーズが登場！)	November 1, 2019; 978-4-7986-2042-8 (Normal Edition); 978-4-7986-2039-8 (Special Edition)	September 11, 2020
34	Rūsu no Taisetsu-sa ga mi ni Shimiru!? Zunōha Menbā dai Katsuyaku! (ルースの大切さが身に染みる!? 頭脳派メンバー大活躍！)	February 29, 2020; 978-4-7986-2140-1	December 5, 2020
35	Forutōze Kara dai go Ōjo ga Gōryū!? Iza Kyoten Kōryaku! (フォルトーゼから第五皇女が合流!? いざ拠点攻略！)	July 1, 2020; 978-4-7986-2246-0	February 1, 2021
36	Maki ga Reinbō Hāto ni Shūshoku!? Mina de "Mahō no Kuni" e! (真希がレインボゥハートに就職!? 皆で"魔法の国"へ！)	October 31, 2020; 978-4-7986-2345-0	May 4, 2021
37	Hisabisa no Nichijō Kai! Aratana Nakama mo Tsurete Umi o Mankitsu! (久々の日常回！ 新たな仲間も連れて海を満喫！)	March 1, 2021; 978-4-7986-2435-8	September 1, 2021
38	Sora Kara Futte Kita 3 Hitome no Sanae no Shōtai wa――!? (空から降ってきた3人目の早苗の正体は――⁉)	July 1, 2021; 978-4-7986-2533-1	November 10, 2021
39	Ryūgakusei Kangei Shikiten ni Awa Sete "Haiiro no Kishi" ga Ugoku!? (留学生歓迎式典に合わせて"灰色の騎士"が動く!?)	November 1, 2021; 978-4-7986-2640-6	March 30, 2022
40	Forutōze e Mukau Mae ni, Min'nade Tabi Shitaku! (フォルトーゼへ向かう前に、みんなで旅支度！)	April 1, 2022; 978-4-7986-2754-0	October 31, 2022
41	Ao Kishi, Futatabi Forutōze no Ji e! (青騎士、ふたたびフォルトーゼの地へ！)	September 30, 2022; 978-4-7986-2967-4	March 13, 2023
42	Shinzo-chu no Uchu Senkan "Ao Kishi" o Shisatsu Shi ni Ikou! (新造中の宇宙戦艦『青騎士』を視察しにいこう！)	March 1, 2023; 978-4-7986-3098-4	September 21, 2023
43	Saikyō no Fujin de Tekishō no Dakkan o Soshi Seyo! (最強の布陣で敵将の奪還を阻止せよ！)	June 30, 2023; 978-4-7986-3219-3	February 1, 2024
44	Natsuyasumi ni Tēma Pāku de Gōyū! Omoide o Tsudzuru Nichijō-hen! (夏休みにテーマパークで豪遊！ 思い出を綴る日常編！)	November 1, 2023; 978-4-7986-3337-4	May 15, 2024
45	Shitsui ni Shizumu Kōtarō. Saiki no Kikkake to Naru no wa ――? (失意に沈む孝太郎。再起のきっかけとなるのは――？)	March 1, 2024; 978-4-7986-3460-9	September 25, 2024
46	Zunō-ha 3-ri no Saku ga Hikaru! Shinru ka Hanru ka no dai Shōbu!! (頭脳派3人の策が光る！ 伸るか反るかの大勝負!!)	July 1, 2024; 978-4-7986-3586-6	January 27, 2025
47	Kishidō-kyū Uchū Senkan Ichiban-kan "Ao Kishi" Hasshin!! (騎士道級宇宙戦艦一番艦『青騎士』発進!!)	November 1, 2024; 978-4-7986-3671-9	June 18, 2025
48	Sarawa reta Kenji-tachi o Sukuidase! Hai Kishi to Chokusetsu Taiketsu! (さらわれた賢治たちを救い出せ！ 灰騎士と直接対決！)	December 1, 2025; 978-4-7986-4025-9	September 4, 2026
49	Teki no Kakushin ni Semare! Uchū Kaizoku, Shutsugeki!! (敵の核心に迫れ！ 宇宙海賊、出撃！！)	May 1, 2026; 978-4-7986-4161-4	November 23, 2026
50	Ginga o Mata ni Kaketa Kessen no Yukue wa!? (銀河を股にかけた決戦の行方は!?)	October 30, 2026; 978-4-7986-4305-2	—

=== Manga ===
A manga adaptation began serialization on December 20, 2013, in Comic Dangan. The series ended on February 16, 2017. The first volume was published by Hobby Japan on July 24, 2014, and the fifth and last on April 27, 2017.

No.	Japanese release date	Japanese ISBN
1	July 26, 2014	978-4-7986-0830-3
2	February 27, 2015	978-4-7986-0962-1
3	September 26, 2015	978-4-7986-1078-8
4	May 27, 2016	978-4-7986-1231-7
5	April 27, 2017	978-4-7986-1441-0

=== Anime ===
A short promotional trailer to advertise the light novels was released in 2010, with animation by Silver Link and directed by Shinichi Watanabe.

A 12-episode anime television series adaptation by Silver Link and directed by Shin Oonuma aired between July 11 and September 26, 2014. The opening theme song is "Koukan win-win Mujouken" (好感win-win無条件) by Heart Invader consisting of Nichika Ōmori, Eri Suzuki, Masumi Tazawa, and Maria Naganawa, while the ending theme is "Love is Milk Tea" (恋はみるくてぃ) performed by petit milady, a unit composed of the voice actresses Aoi Yūki and Ayana Taketatsu. The anime has been licensed by Sentai Filmworks. MVM Films has licensed the Series in the UK.

==== Episodes ====
No.	Title	Air date (Note: Tokyo MX uses an after-midnight programming schedule, so that the first broadcast was listed as Friday, July 11, at 25:05, which is Saturday, July 12, at 1:05am.: TOKYO MX ＊ アニメ「六畳間の侵略者！？」 (in Japanese). – Top – shows air date of 25:05; TOKYO MX ＊ アニメ番組表 (in Japanese). Archived from the original on July 2, 2014. – shows the program in the block for friday late night)
1	"The Invasion Begins!?"; Transliteration: "Shinryaku kaishi!?" (Japanese: 侵略開始!?)	July 11, 2014
With the help of his friend Kenji Matsudaira, Kōtarō Satomi moves into room 106 at Corona House, attracted by the low, ¥5000 a month rent. The following day, while working at an archaeology site, he falls into a hole and meets a mysterious woman. He wakes up in the hospital and apparently just hit his head. At school, he joins the Knitting Club, whose only other member is Harumi Sakuraba, his upperclassman. His reason is to "do something for someone". When he comes back to his apartment, he finds Sanae Higashihongan, a ghost claiming that room 106 is her house and wanting him out but he keeps her at bay with sacred items from his grandma. They are interrupted in turn by Yurika Nijino, a magical girl who comes crashing through the window, Kiriha Kurano from underground, and Theiamillis Gre Fortorthe along with her servant, Ruthkhania Nye Pardomshiha who come out of the wall. Fighting ensues until the landlady, Shizuka Kasagi, comes in and forces them to sign a peace treaty.
2	"More Invasions?!"; Transliteration: "Saranaru shinryaku!?" (Japanese: さらなる侵略!?)	July 18, 2014
Corona House's landlady, Shizuka, imposes the Corona Convention on the lot, which causes the invaders to rethink their strategies. Meanwhile, Koutarou participates in the Knitting Society, where its president, Sakuraba Harumi and Koutarou spend their time, away from troubles, but then there's word that four new students will be transferring into his school...
3	"Friends and Promises"; Transliteration: "Yakusoku to yūjō" (Japanese: 約束と友情)	July 25, 2014
The lot continue to fight over the room, and eventually decide to use the inter-club obstacle course marathon as their next battleground. Koutarou and Harumi enter as part of the Knitting Society, along with Sanae. Theia and Kiriha get their underlings and make their preparations.
4	"The Beach Plot?!"; Transliteration: "Inbō no kaisuiyoku!?" (Japanese: 陰謀の海水浴!?)	August 1, 2014
The fight over room 106 is officially on a cease-fire as they've all received a voucher to travel to an ocean-side resort for relaxation and hot springs. Everyone is excited and they all decide to go buy some swimsuits, but something seems to be going on with Sanae.
5	"Precious Charms"; Transliteration: "Taisetsuna omamori" (Japanese: 大切なお守り)	August 8, 2014
Sanae caught by Ghost Hunters and almost sold to someone else.
6	"Cultural Festivals and Beetles!?"; Transliteration: "Bunkasai to kabutomushi!?" (Japanese: 文化祭とカブトムシ!?)	August 15, 2014
To help out the theatre club the tenants write plays as part of their competition. Theia's play based on the Fortorthe legend of the Blue Knight wins and is chosen to be performed at the upcoming cultural festival. Meanwhile, the short emergence of a space distortion near earth worries Thea and Ruth.
7	"My Knight"; Transliteration: "Warawa no kishi" (Japanese: わらわの騎士)	August 22, 2014
Koutarou and Harumi end up as the leads in the play. During rehearsals Theia notices that Koutarou is a surprisingly good fit for the role of the Blue Knight, while Kiriha wonders about similarities between the Blue Knight and a person from her past. Theia's rival for the throne, Princess Clan, appears and tries to kill Theia, but Koutarou somehow is able to summon power in his sword replica and repulse Clan and drive her off with the help of Kiriha and – unnoticed, of course – Yurika. Theia orders Koutarou to undergo knight training – and knights him while he is sleeping.
8	"An Evil Magical Girl Appears!?"; Transliteration: "Aku no mahō shōjo tōjō!?" (Japanese: 悪の魔法少女登場!?)	August 29, 2014
9	"The Sun and a Rainbow"; Transliteration: "Hidamari to niji" (Japanese: 陽だまりと虹)	September 5, 2014
10	"The Earth Empire vs. The Sun Squad!?"; Transliteration: "Chitei teikoku VS taiyō butai!?" (Japanese: 地底帝国VS太陽部隊!?)	September 12, 2014
11	"Someday, With Them"; Transliteration: "Itsuka ano hito to" (Japanese: いつかあの人と)	September 19, 2014
12	"Invasion Going Well!?"; Transliteration: "Shinryaku junchō!?" (Japanese: 侵略順調!?)	September 26, 2014
