= Nichika Ōmori =

Japanese voice actress

- 大森 日雅
- Born: October 15, 1994 (age 32); Nagano Prefecture, Japan
- Occupation: Voice actress
- Years active: 2014–present
- Agent: Across Entertainment
- Known for: PriPara as Chiri Tsukikawa; Kiratto Pri☆Chan as Melpan

Nichika Ōmori (Japanese: 大森 日雅, Hepburn: Ōmori Nichika; born October 15, 1994) is a Japanese voice actress from Nagano Prefecture who is affiliated with Across Entertainment. After graduating from acting school, she made her voice acting debut as the character Yurika Nijino in the anime series Invaders of the Rokujouma!?. She is also known for her roles as Asahi Kuga in Seven Senses of the Re'Union and Yurine Hanazono in Dropkick on My Devil!

== Early life and career ==
Ōmori was born in Nagano Prefecture on October 15, 1994. As a child, she learned to play the piano at the age of two, and she had an interest in anime series such as Sailor Moon; while in kindergarten, she frequently imitated the character Sailor Moon, and "wished to become a magical girl". She would also watch Gundam with her four older brothers, but she would not consider herself a fan of the series until she reached junior high school. She had a desire to participate in a school play production of Journey to the West, but her teacher would tell her to try out narration and speech contests instead.

During her junior high school years, Ōmori went to Victoria, British Columbia for studies. It was during her time in Canada when she decided to become a voice actress. After returning to Japan, she enrolled in an acting school run by the talent agency Pro-Fit. Following her graduation from the school, she joined the talent agency Link Plan. In 2014, she made her debut as a voice actress, playing the role of Yurika Nijino in the anime series Invaders of the Rokujouma!?

Ōmori would continue playing main or supporting roles in anime, such as Noa Sakura in Pan de Peace!, Chiri Tsukikawa in PriPara, and Chiya Sakagami in Mahou Shoujo Nante Mouiidesukara. In 2018, she played the roles of Hina Kiga in Seven Senses of the Re'Union and Yurine Hanazono in Dropkick on My Devil!. She, together with her Dropkick on My Devil! co-stars, also performed the series' opening theme "Ano Ko ni Dropkick" (あの娘にドロップキック, Ano Ko ni Doroppukikku).

On March 1, 2021, she transferred to Across Entertainment.

On October 17, 2023, Ōmori announced her marriage to music producer Yunomi.

== Filmography ==
=== Anime ===
2014

- Invaders of the Rokujouma!? (Yurika Nijino)
- Monthly Girls' Nozaki-kun (Women's basketball club member)
- Nobunaga Concerto (Mori Rikimaru)
- 夢想夏郷, 東方 (Touhou Musou Kakyou / A Summer Day's Dream) (Alice Margatroid)

2015

- Sky Wizards Academy (Coela Viper)
- Cross Ange (Marika)
- Castle Town Dandelion (Chika)
- World Break: Aria of Curse for a Holy Swordsman (Yuri Oregvitch Zhirkov)
- Battle Spirits (Okuni Midoriyama, Kinoto)

2016

- Pandora in the Crimson Shell: Ghost Urn
- First Love Monster (Yui Nakamura)
- Rainbow Days (Aya Ōno)
- Pan de Peace! (Noa Sakura)
- Hundred (LiZA)
- PriPara (Chiri Tsukikawa)
- Mahou Shoujo Nante Mouiidesukara (Chiya Sakagami)

2018

- Seven Senses of the Re'Union (Asahi Kuga)
- Dropkick on My Devil! (Yurine Hanazono)
- Armor Shop for Ladies & Gentlemen (Mokuku)

2019

- How Clumsy you are, Miss Ueno (Mizuna Tanaka)
- Rainy Cocoa side G

2020

- Darwin's Game (Rain Kashiwagi)
- Science Fell in Love, So I Tried to Prove It (Ena Ibarada)
- Dropkick on My Devil!! Dash (Yurine Hanazono)
- Kiratto Pri☆Chan (Melpan)
- Super HxEros (Chacha)

2021

- Farewell, My Dear Cramer (Kei Hanabusa)

2022

- She Professed Herself Pupil of the Wise Man (Mira/Dunbalf Gandagore/Sakimori Kagami)
- Science Fell in Love, So I Tried to Prove It r=1-sinθ (Ena Ibarada)
- My Isekai Life (Higesura)
- Dropkick on My Devil!! X (Yurine Hanazono)
- Do It Yourself!! (Jobko)

2024

- Re:Monster (Hobsato)

2025

- Scooped Up by an S-Rank Adventurer! (Ryouen)

2027

- Inherit the Winds (Kurosuke)
- Mercedes and the Waning Moon (Margitte)

=== Video games ===
- Granado Espada (Charlotte)
- Kirara Fantasia (Harumi Hosono)
- Moe! Ninja Girls RPG (Iori Natsume)
- Crash Fever (Xibalba)
- Girls' Frontline (Chauchat), (Six12)
- Crash Team Racing Nitro-Fueled (Yaya Panda)
- Azur Lane (Impero)
- Goddess of victory: Nikke (Label)
- Love on Leave (Hibiki Amakusa)
- A Certain Magical Index: Imaginary Fest (Qliphah Puzzle 545)
