= Witch (archetype) =

Archetype of the witch in Jungian psychology

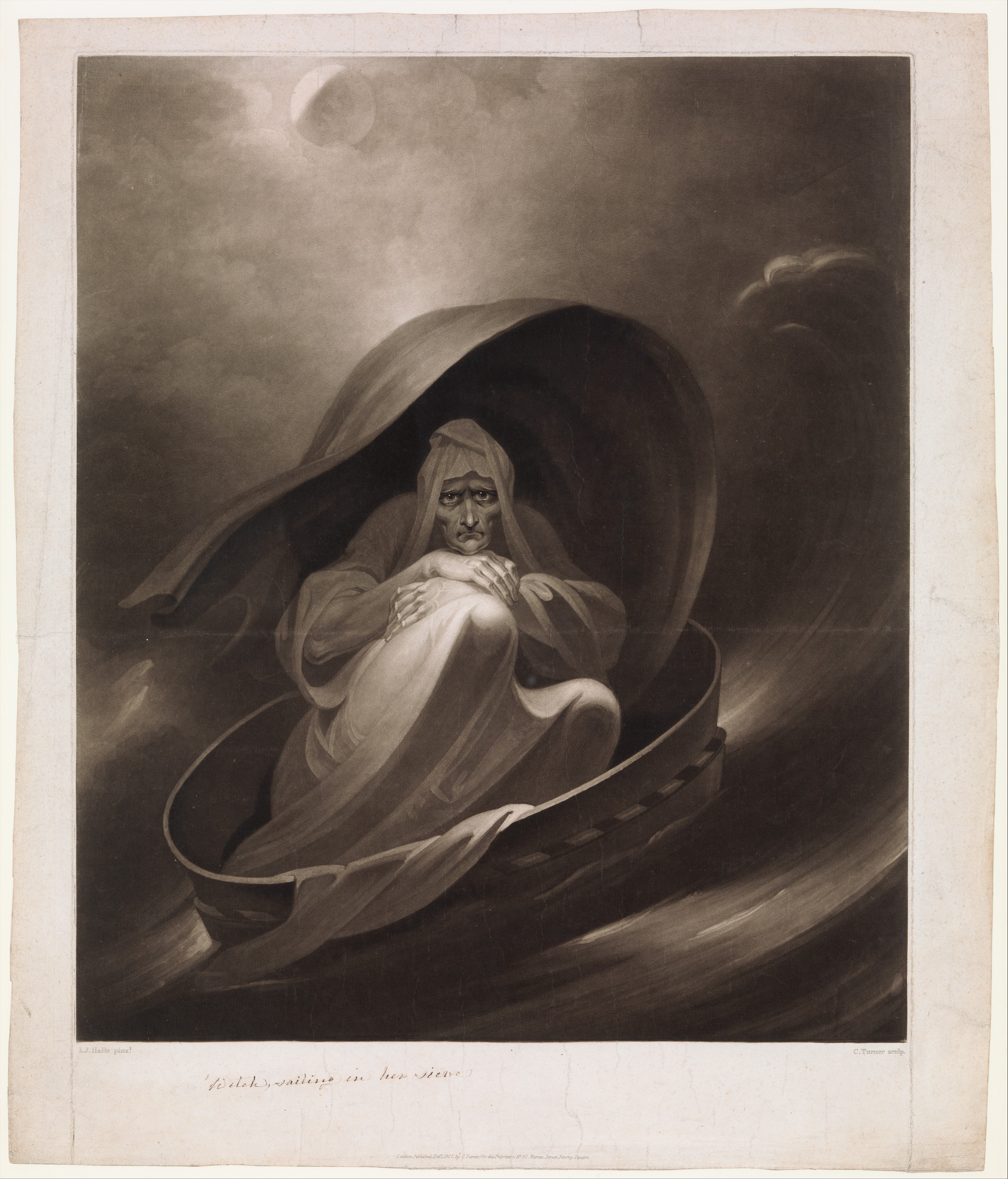
A Witch Sailing to Aleppo in a Sieve, print, Charles Turner, after John James Halls

In Jungian depth psychology, the witch archetype is a common portrayal of a woman, usually old and living alone, who practices dark magic and other types of witchcraft. Witches are typically considered to be a dangerous, lurking threat. How the witch archetype is viewed typically depends on the religious and political context as well as the social context and its gender politics. Jean La Fontaine wrote that the "stereotype of evil appears not to have been closely connected to the actions of real people except when it was mobilised against the current enemies of the Church."

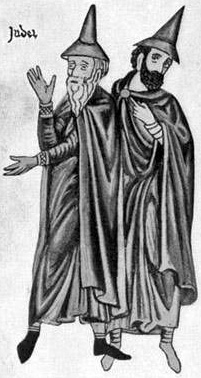
German Jews of the twelfth century. From Herrad von Landsperg, Hortus deliciarum

The origins of the witch archetype have been connected to antisemitic beliefs: in 1215, the Fourth Council of the Lateran issued an edict that all Jews must wear identifying headgear, a pointed cap known as a Judenhat. This style of hat then became associated with black magic, Satan worship, and other acts of which the Jews were accused.

== Jungian archetypes ==
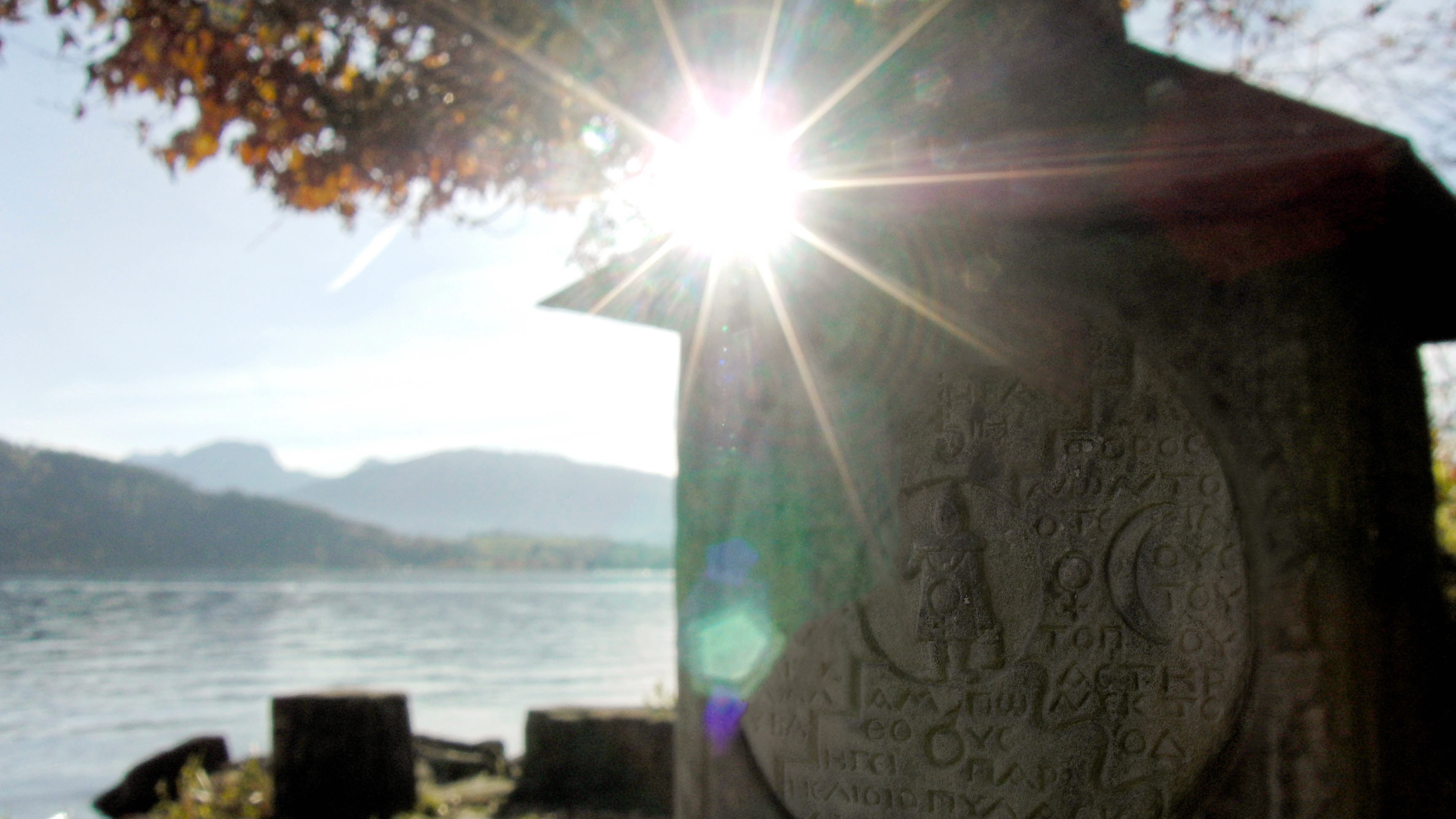
Sun rays hit Jung's mystical cuboid stone at Zurich lake

In Jungian psychology, archetypes are innate, universal psychic structures that influence human thoughts, emotions, and behaviors. The witch archetype emerges as a dynamic representation of the collective unconscious, encapsulating both the light and shadow aspects of human existence. The witch symbolizes the repressed, marginalized, and misunderstood facets of the psyche, often associated with the darker aspects of femininity and the mysteries of the unconscious.

According to Jung,

The primordial image, or archetype, is a figure—be it a daemon, a human being, or a process—that constantly recurs in the course of history and appears wherever creative fantasy is freely expressed. Essentially, therefore, it is a mythological figure. When we examine these images more closely, we find that they give form to countless typical experiences of our ancestors.[...] In each of these images there is a little piece of human psychology and human fate, a remnant of the joys and sorrows that have been repeated countless times in our ancestral history.

Jung traces the term back to Philo, Irenaeus, and the Corpus Hermeticum, which associate archetypes with divinity and the creation of the world, and notes the close relationship of Platonic ideas. (Note: Singer (1968), pp. 36–37: "Jung reminds us that the term 'archetype' occurs as early as Philo Judaeus, with reference to the Imago Dei (God-image) in man. It can also be found in Irenaeus, who says: 'The creator of the world did not fashion these things directly from himself but copied them from archetypes outside himself'. In the Corpus Hermeticum, God is called 'archetypal light.'" Referring to Jung (1959), p. 75, ¶ 149.)

== Archetypal feminine ==
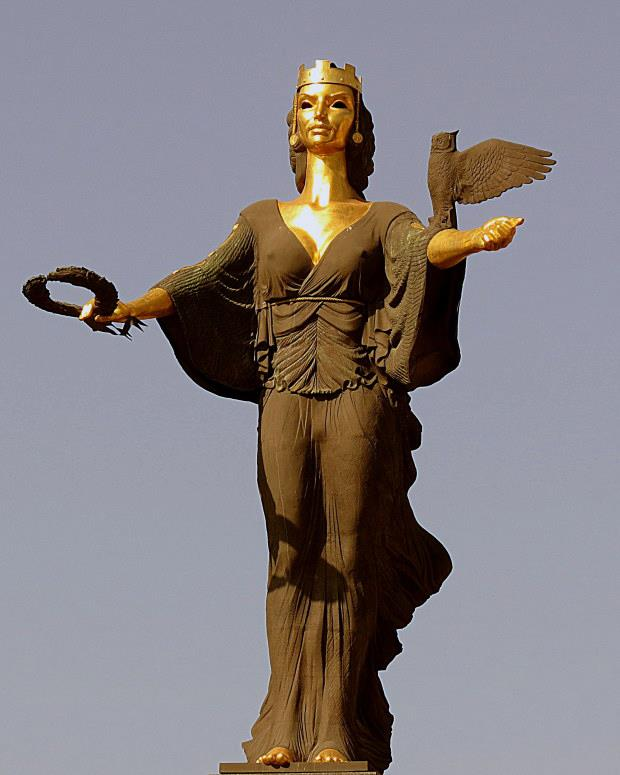
Sophia, a positive Anima figure of the Great Mother

According to Jungian psychologist, Erich Neumann, the Archetypal Feminine has two major axes: "M", her elementary character with focus on the maternal, and "A", her transformative character with focus on the anima or "soul image". Each axis is a continuum between positive and negative poles.

Figures such as the Archetypal Feminine embrace an "uroboric character" (like a serpent eating its own tail) or bi-valence. Thus the major archetype of the Great Mother has two major aspects, Good Mother (M+) and Terrible Mother (M−), which are in opposition and yet coexist. Neumann gives the example of the witch in the fairytale of Hansel and Gretel whose house (which symbolises the external) is made of gingerbread, but who in reality (internally) "eats little children". The other side of the coin is that the Terrible Mother, which is apparently negative, may exhibit a positive, transformative character, strengthening the ego, for instance, as in the case of Perseus who, in order to win Andromeda, must first kill the Terrible Mother, or witnessed in myths of heroic, masculine, dragon-slaying.

== The shadow ==
Central to Jungian thought is the concept of the "shadow," which encompasses the suppressed and denied aspects of the self, relegated to the shadow in the personal or collective unconscious, or projected onto others. According to Jung: "Unfortunately there can be no doubt that man is, on the whole, less good than he imagines himself or wants to be. Everyone carries a shadow, and the less it is embodied in the individual's conscious life, the blacker and denser it is." Jungian psychoanalyst James Hollis writes, "As Jung noted, whatever we deny within ourselves will come to us sooner or later and demand payment. Then, we are forced to repair within [...] and seek healing from our own nature and its restorative capacity."

The witch archetype embodies this shadow self, representing the unacknowledged desires, instincts, and fears that are often relegated to the depths of the unconscious. For example, a person who identifies strongly with the witch archetype may struggle with feelings of being an outsider or having unconventional beliefs, resulting in social isolation or self-doubt.

== Archetype of the witch ==
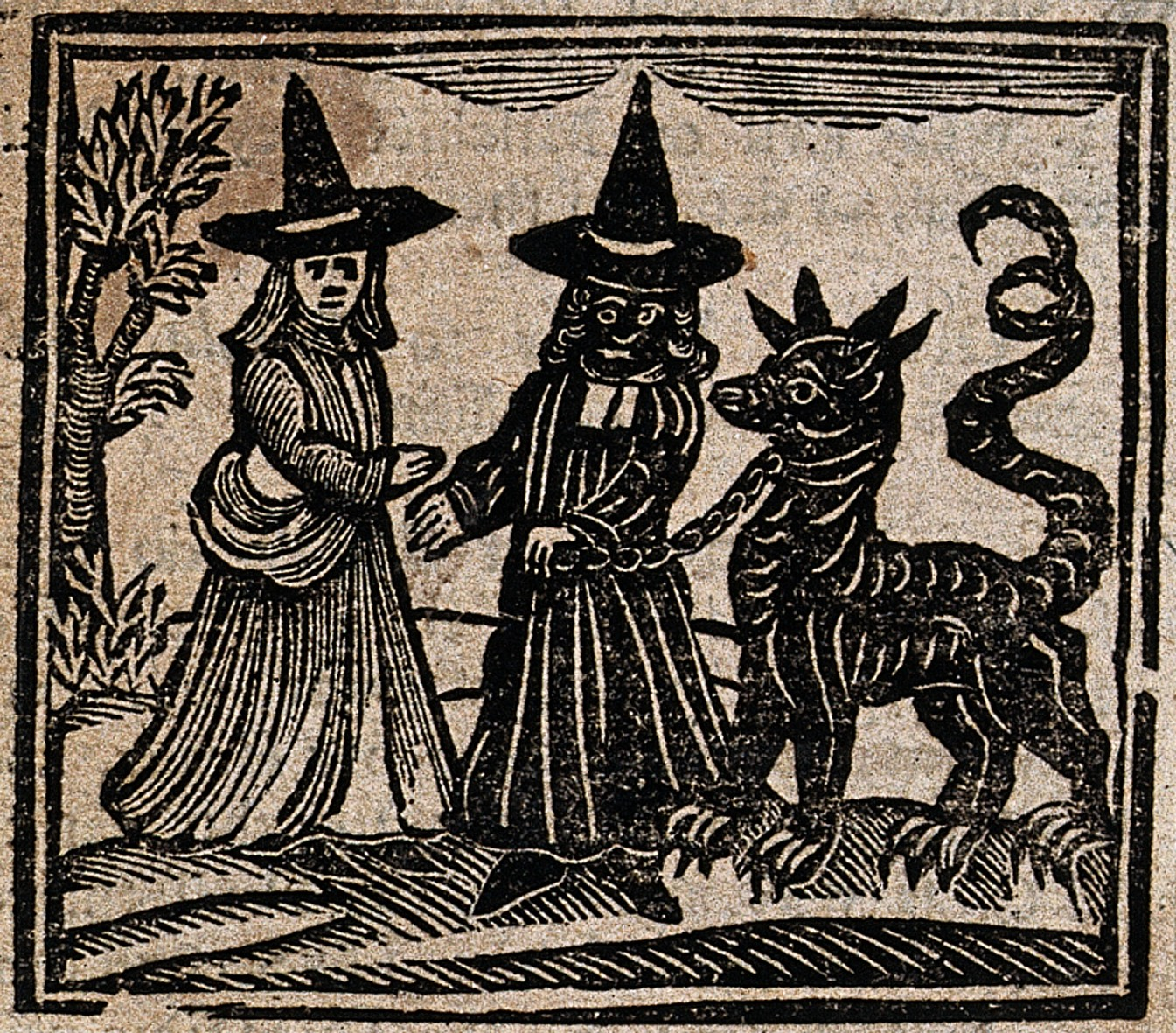
Witchcraft: a white-faced witch meeting a black-faced witch with a great beast (Woodcut, 1720)

The witch archetype, deeply embedded in the collective unconscious, finds expression in myths, folklore, literature, and art across cultures. From ancient goddesses to contemporary representations, the witch's image evolves while retaining its core symbolism. The "young witch" (A−) archetype is associated by Neumann with the Terrible Mother, seduction, and the negative anima. The "old witch" (M−) is associated with psycho-spiritual death mysteries and the Terrible Mother. Isis, goddess of healing, magic and mysteries, also has her dark side and embraces elements of both Good and Terrible Mothers. Sophia, archetype or goddess of wisdom, and an archetypal Virgin (A+) counterpart to motherhood, is associated with the positive.

In society, the fear and misunderstanding of the witch archetype can lead to the projection of these repressed aspects onto individuals who may be seen as different or unconventional. Historical witch hunts and persecutions are stark examples of how collective anxieties around the archetype can be channeled into harmful actions. The vilification of those who exhibit traits associated with the witch, such as independence, wisdom, and defiance of norms, can result in the suppression of individual expression and the perpetuation of social injustices.

== In art and literature ==
Witches have a long history of being depicted in art and literature.

Witch characters—women who work powerful evil magic—appear in ancient Roman literature from the first century BC onward. They are typically hags who chant harmful incantations; make poisonous potions from herbs and the body parts of animals and humans; sacrifice children; raise the dead; can control the natural world; can shapeshift themselves and others into animals; and invoke underworld deities and spirits. They include Lucan's Erichtho, Horace's Canidia, Ovid's Dipsas, and Apuleius's Meroe.

Medieval and early modern European depictions of witches were further inspired by texts such as Canon Episcopi, a demonology-centered work of literature, and Malleus Maleficarum, a "witch-craze" manual published in 1487, by Heinrich Kramer and Jacob Sprenger. Witches in fiction span a wide array of characterizations. They are typically, but not always, female, and generally depicted as either villains or heroines.

=== In art ===
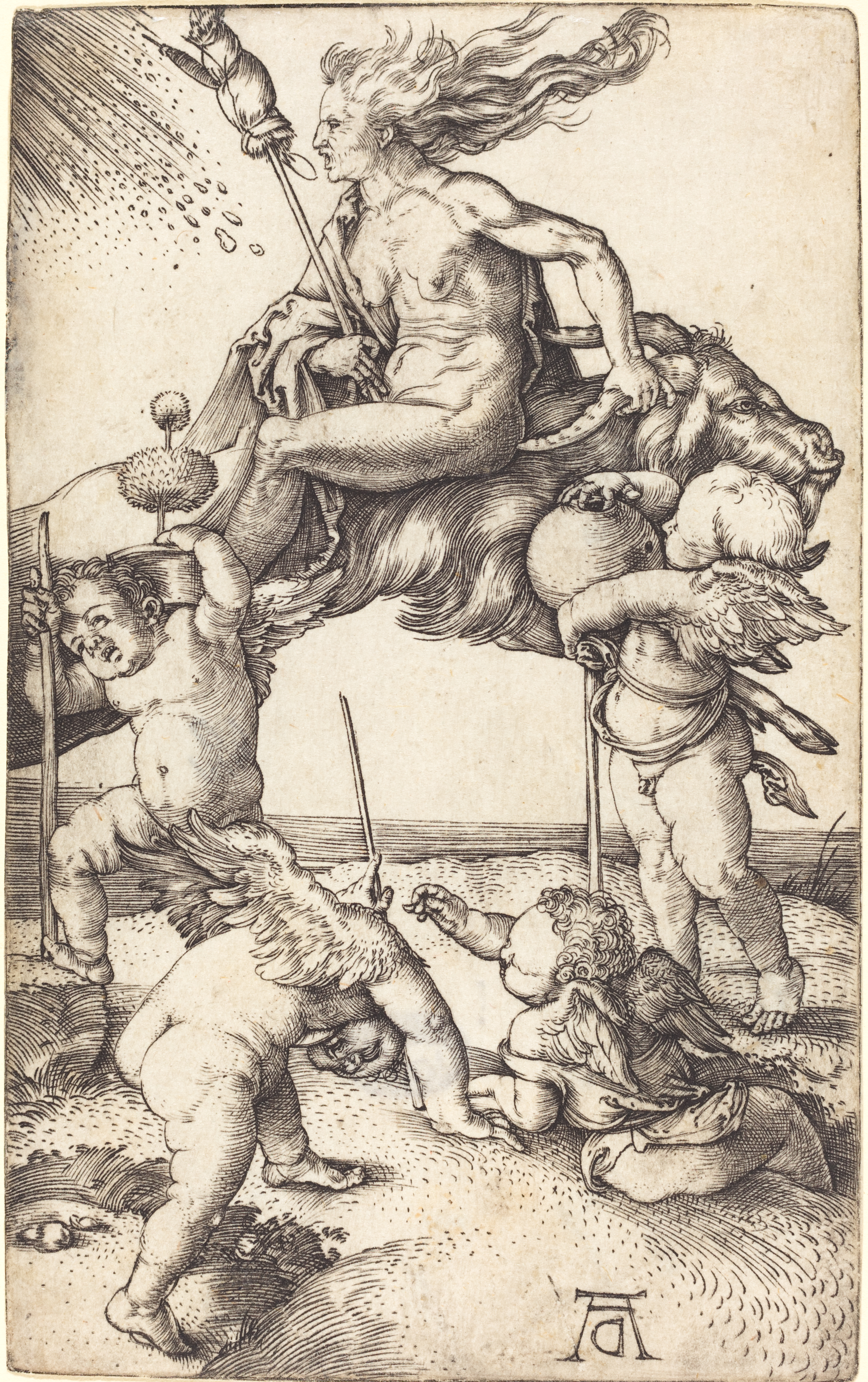
Albrecht Dürer c. 1500: Witch riding backwards on a goat

Witches have a long history of being depicted in art, although most of their earliest artistic depictions seem to originate in early modern Europe, particularly the Medieval and Renaissance periods. Many scholars attribute their manifestation in art as inspired by texts such as Canon Episcopi, a demonology-centered work of literature, and Malleus Maleficarum, a "witch-craze" manual published in 1487, by Heinrich Kramer and Jacob Sprenger.

Canon Episcopi, a ninth-century text that explored the subject of demonology, initially introduced concepts that would continuously be associated with witches, such as their ability to fly or their believed fornication and sexual relations with the devil. The text refers to two women, Diana the Huntress and Herodias, who both express the duality of female sorcerers. Diana was described as having a heavenly body and as the "protectress of childbirth and fertility" while Herodias symbolized "unbridled sensuality". They thus represent the mental powers and cunning sexuality that witches used as weapons to trick men into performing sinful acts which would result in their eternal punishment. These characteristics were distinguished as Medusa-like or Lamia-like traits when seen in any artwork (Medusa's mental trickery was associated with Diana the Huntress's psychic powers and Lamia was a rumored female figure in the Medieval ages sometimes used in place of Herodias).

One of the first individuals to regularly depict witches after the witch-craze of the medieval period was Albrecht Dürer, a German Renaissance artist. His famous 1497 engraving The Four Witches, portrays four physically attractive and seductive nude witches. Their supernatural identities are emphasized by the skulls and bones lying at their feet as well as the devil discreetly peering at them from their left. The women's sensuous presentation speaks to the overtly sexual nature they were attached to in early modern Europe. Moreover, this attractiveness was perceived as a danger to ordinary men who they could seduce and tempt into their sinful world. Some scholars interpret this piece as utilizing the logic of the Canon Episcopi, in which women used their mental powers and bodily seduction to enslave and lead men onto a path of eternal damnation, differing from the unattractive depiction of witches that would follow in later Renaissance years.

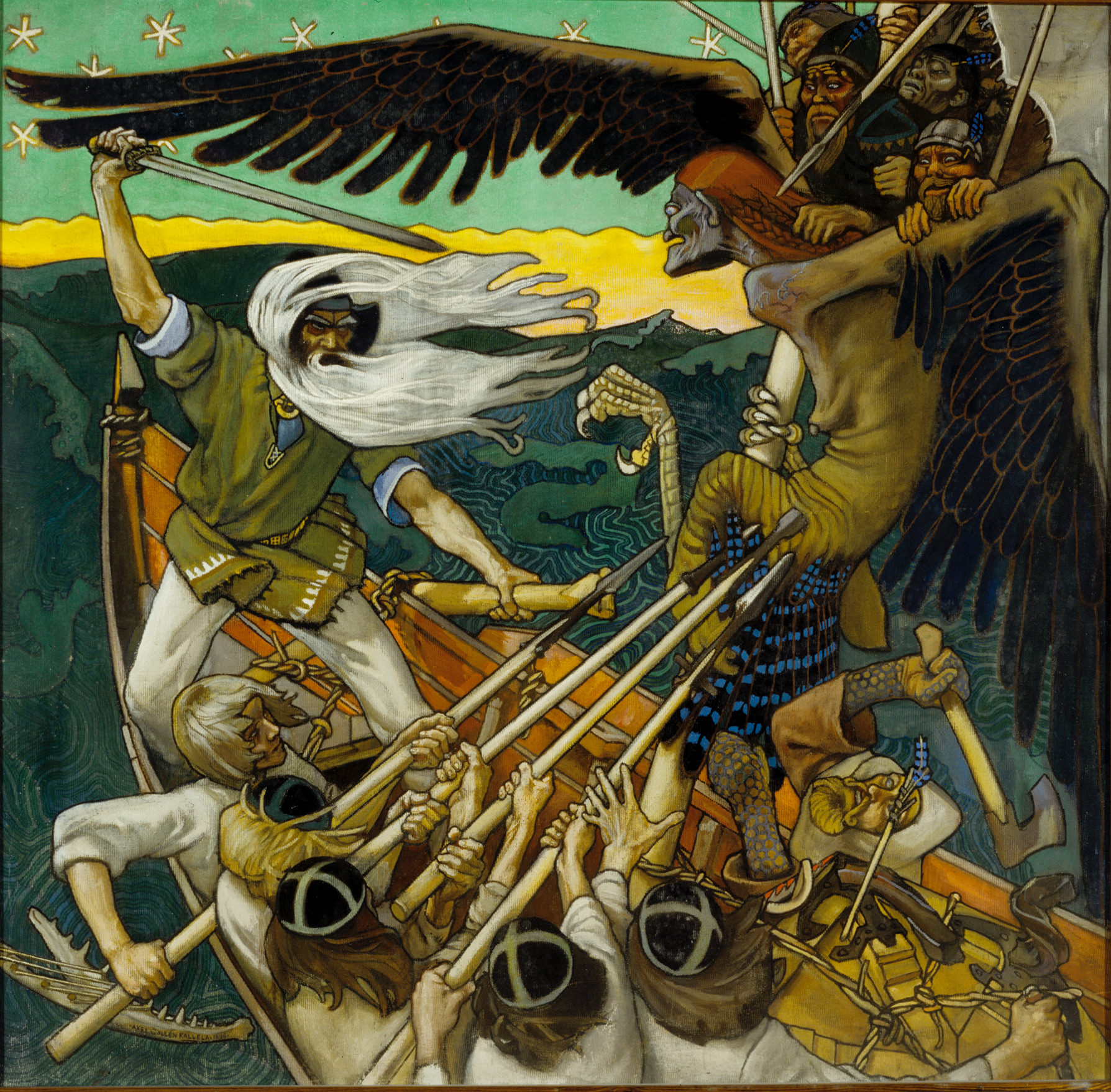
Louhi, a powerful and wicked witch queen of the land known as Pohjola in the Finnish epic poetry Kalevala, attacking Väinämöinen in the form of a giant eagle with her troops on her back. (The Defense of the Sampo, Akseli Gallen-Kallela, 1896)

Dürer also employed other ideas from the Middle Ages that were commonly associated with witches. Specifically, his art often referred to former 12th- to 13th-century Medieval iconography addressing the nature of female sorcerers. In the Medieval period, there was a widespread fear of witches, accordingly producing an association of dark, intimidating characteristics with witches, such as cannibalism (witches described as "[sucking] the blood of newborn infants") or described as having the ability to fly, usually on the back of black goats. As the Renaissance period began, these concepts of witchcraft were suppressed, leading to a drastic change in the sorceress' appearances, from sexually explicit beings to the 'ordinary' typical housewives of this time period. This depiction, known as the 'Waldensian' witch became a cultural phenomenon of early Renaissance art. The term originates from the 12th-century monk Peter Waldo, who established his own religious sect which explicitly opposed the luxury and commodity-influenced lifestyle of the Christian church clergy, and whose sect was excommunicated before being persecuted as "practitioners of witchcraft and magic".

Subsequent artwork exhibiting witches tended to consistently rely on cultural stereotypes about these women. These stereotypes were usually rooted in early Renaissance religious discourse, specifically the Christian belief that an "earthly alliance" had taken place between Satan's female minions who "conspired to destroy Christendom".

Another significant artist whose art consistently depicted witches was Dürer's apprentice, Hans Baldung Grien, a 15th-century German artist. His chiaroscuro woodcut, Witches, created in 1510, visually encompassed all the characteristics that were regularly assigned to witches during the Renaissance. Social beliefs labeled witches as supernatural beings capable of doing great harm, possessing the ability to fly, and as cannibalistic. The urn in Witches seems to contain pieces of the human body, which the witches are seen consuming as a source of energy. Meanwhile, their nudity while feasting is recognized as an allusion to their sexual appetite, and some scholars read the witch riding on the back of a goat-demon as representative of their "flight-inducing [powers]". This connection between women's sexual nature and sins was thematic in the pieces of many Renaissance artists, especially Christian artists, due to cultural beliefs which characterized women as overtly sexual beings who were less capable (in comparison to men) of resisting sinful temptation.

=== In literature ===
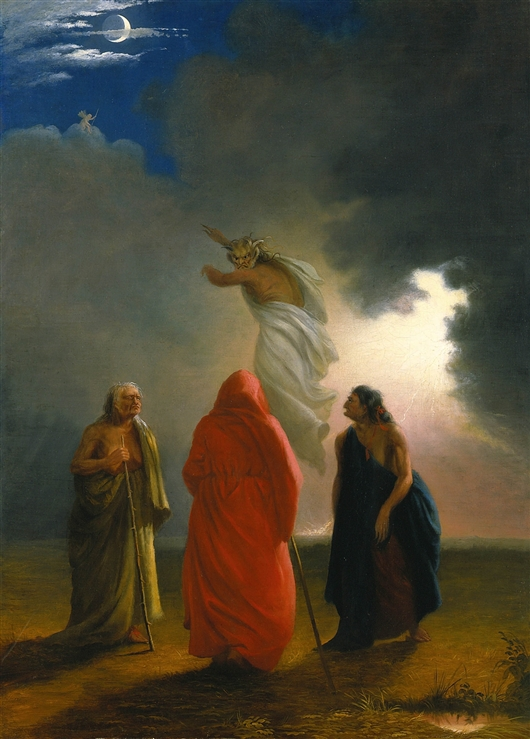
1850s painting by William Rimmer depicting the Three Witches from William Shakespeare's Macbeth

Witches in fiction span a wide array of characterizations. They are typically, but not always, female, and generally depicted as either villains or heroines.

The classic fairy tale "Hansel and Gretel" presents an example of the "witch villain" figure. The story involves a cannibalistic witch that is eventually outwitted by the children she tries to eat and is burned to death in her own oven. "Snow White" depicts a murderous, tempting magician for its main antagonist. The witch is labeled an evil queen and meets her demise after being forced to dance in red-hot iron shoes. "The Six Swans" includes a step-mother who magically turns her step-children into swans out of spite and jealousy. In retaliation, the figure labeled as witch is eventually burned at the stake. Such examples within the Brothers Grimm's works demonstrate not only evidence of the figure of "witch villain" but also exhibits their punishment by injury or violent death. Other examples of villainous witches in literature include the White Witch from C. S. Lewis's The Lion, the Witch and the Wardrobe and the Grand High Witch from Roald Dahl's The Witches.

Living Alone, published in 1919, uses the "witch heroine" as an agent in support of female liberation. Stella Benson's novel surrounds the musings of a female witch who functions as an anarchic force in the lives of middle-class Londoners. Her non-harmful magic aims to "shake the most downtrodden women out of complacency and normality" to meet a state of liberation. The importance of such a heroine sheds light on the positive effects associated with magic and witchcraft, a change from the often brutalized and tortured illustrations found in early nineteenth century literature. Other examples of heroic witches in fictional literature include Glinda from The Wonderful Wizard of Oz (1900), Serafina Pekkala from His Dark Materials (1995–2000), and Hermione Granger from the Harry Potter series.

== See also ==
- Baba Yaga – Slavic mythological figure
- Witch hat – Style of hat
