= Zamb =

Japanese rock band

- Also known as: Zuga Anisong Metal Band
- Origin: Japan
- Genres: Heavy metal, anisong
- Years active: 2018–2020
- Labels: D-GO (2019); Sacra Music (2020)
- Past members: Izumi Zuga; GAK
- Website: Official Website

Zamb (ザム) was a Japanese musical group produced by Daiko Nagato. On 10 June 2020, the band debuted with the single Love Satisfaction. The name "Zamb" is an acronym of the original bandname "Zuga Anisong Metal Band" (図画アニソンメタルバンド). They adopted the short-form name on their major debut.

== History ==
Zamb was formed in 2018 with four members, including two original members, Izumi Zuga and GAK, and two support members (Kurumatani Keisuke from Sensation, and Ryuu Kida from Garl). They first appeared as "Zuga Anisong Metal Band" at a free live event called Onto.

In July 2019, they posted cover songs of famous anime theme music onto their official YouTube channel, with a heavy metal twist; these included the songs Zankoku na Tenshi no Thesis and Moonlight Densetsu. Gak's heavy metal influence came from his now deceased father, Hiroaki Matsuzawa (formerly a member of the heavy metal band "Make-Up"), who was also a musician and wrote music for the anime television series Saint Seya.

In August 2019, the band launched an official Twitter account, and, in March 2020, an official website.

In October 2019, they appeared at the free music festival Onto, where they performed original theme songs.

On 10 June 2020, the band debuted with Sacra Music under Sony Music Entertainment Japan, releasing their debut single Love Satisfaction. This was used as the end theme to anime television series Dropkick on My Devil!. Their contract under the label expired at the end of 2020.

== Past Members ==
- Izumi Zuga (図画泉美) – vocals
- GAK – Guitar, Scream

== Discography ==
=== Singles ===
	Release date	Title	Charts
1st	2020/06/10	Love Satisfaction	48
