= List of Twin Star Exorcists chapters =

Twin Star Exorcists is a Japanese manga series written and illustrated by Yoshiaki Sukeno. It was serialized in Shueisha's shōnen manga magazine Jump Square from November 2, 2013, to September 4, 2024.

Viz Media licensed the series for publication in North America, with the first volume released on July 7, 2015.

The series has also spawned two spin-off series and three light novels.

== Volumes ==
No.	Original release date	Original ISBN	English release date	English ISBN
1	February 4, 2014	978-4-08-880015-8	July 7, 2015	978-1-4215-8174-3
1. "Rokuro and Benio" (ろくろと紅緒, Rokuro to Benio); 2. "The Twin Stars Cross" (双星交差, Sōsei Kōsa); 3. "The Sound of Magano" (禍野の音, Magano no Oto); Bonus: "Benio in Kyoto" (京都の紅緒, Kyōto no Benio)
2	June 4, 2014	978-4-08-880117-9	October 6, 2015	978-1-4215-8175-0
4. "Who Are You?" ((其は誰ぞ, So wa Dare zo); 5. "Your Courage, My Courage" (君の勇気、私の勇気, Kimi no Yūki, Watashi no Yūki); 6. "Rokuro's True Feelings" (ろくろの気持ち, Rokuro no Kimochi); 7. "Tangled Tragedy" (交錯する悲劇, Kōsaku suru Higeki)
3	October 3, 2014	978-4-08-880203-9	January 5, 2016	978-1-4215-8217-7
8. "A Glimpse of Evil" (邪悪の片鱗, Jaaku no Henrin); 9. "As an Exorcist" (陰陽師として, Onmyōji Toshite); 10. "Evil" (邪悪, Jaaku); 11. "As If a New Star Were Born" (新たな星の生まるるが如く, Aratana Hoshi no Umaruru ga Gotoku)
4	January 5, 2015	978-4-08-880294-7	April 5, 2016	978-1-4215-8321-1
12. "The Maiden Battle of a Certain Betrothed Couple" (ある夫婦の初陣, Aru Fūfu no Uijin); 13. "Twin Star Sublimation" (双星昇華, Sōsei Shōka) 13.5 "Break" (破, Ha); 14. "My Fang" (私の牙, Watashi no Kiba); Bonus: "Benio's Struggle" (紅緒、奮闘, Benio, Funtō)
5	May 1, 2015	978-4-08-880370-8	July 5, 2016	978-1-4215-8518-5
15. "The Star Musician" (星の奏者, Hoshi no Sōsha); 16. "The Day Rokuro Arrived" (ろくろが来た日, Rokuro ga Kita Hi); 17. "Two Paths, Their Paths" (ふたつの道、ふたりの道, Futatsu no Michi, Futari no Michi); 18. "The Continuation of the Dream" (夢のつづき, Yume no Tsuzuki)
6	September 4, 2015	978-4-08-880473-6	October 4, 2016	978-1-4215-8707-3
19. "The Flight of the Stars" (星々の躍動, Hoshiboshi no Yakudō); 20. "Master of the Void" (虚空の覇者, Kokū no Hasha); 21. "Perfect Link"; Bonus: "The Many Faces of Mayura" (繭良、七変化, Mayura, Shichihenge) Bonus: "Poached Rokuro" (ろくろ、沸騰, Rokuro, Futtō) Bonus: "Suzaku's Ceremony of Accession to the Twelve Guardians" (十二天将 ”朱雀” 継承式典, Jūni Tenshō "Suzaku" Keishō Shikiden)
7	January 4, 2016	978-4-08-880591-7	January 3, 2017	978-1-4215-9045-5
22. "Curse" (呪縛, Jubaku); 23. "A Curse-Free Sky" (呪縛無キ空, Jubaku Naki Sora); 24. "History of Defeat" (敗北の歴史, Haiboku no Rekishi); 25. "Turnover" (Turn Over)
8	April 4, 2016	978-4-08-880657-0	April 4, 2017	978-1-4215-9160-5
26. "Those Without Desire" (求めざる者は, Motomezaru Mono wa); 27. "Mayura's Battle" (繭良の戦い, Mayura no Tatakai); 28. "The First Cry of the Darkness" (黒の産声, Kuro no Ubugoe); 29. "A Sewer Rat's Dream" (溝鼠の夢, Dobunezumi no Yume)
9	August 4, 2016	978-4-08-880757-7	July 4, 2017	978-1-4215-9441-5
30. "The Encroachment of Magano" (禍野侵食, Magano Shinshoku); 31. "What I Fear" (俺のコワいモノ, Ore no Kowai Mono); 32. "Future of the Twin Stars" (二人が進む明日…, Futari ga Susumu Ashita...); 33. "Separation of the Twin Stars" (双星乖離, Sōsei Kairi)
10	December 2, 2016	978-4-08-880829-1	October 3, 2017	978-1-42-159622-8
34. "The Island of Stars" (星集う島, Hoshi Tsudou Shima); 35. "Front Line" (最前線, Saizensen); 36. "Where It All Started: The Depths of Unfathomable Grace" (はじまりの場所、幽玄の彼方, Hajimari no Basho, Yūgen no Kanata); 37. "The Little Giant of Adashino" (化野の小さな巨人, Adashino no Chīsana Kyojin)
11	March 3, 2017	978-4-08-881030-0	January 2, 2018	978-1-42-159764-5
38. "A Foolish Wish" (醜き願い, Minikuki Negai); 39. "The Heir of Tsuchimikado" (土御門の後継, Tsuchimikado no Kōkei); 40. "First Three Months" (それぞれの3ゕ月, Sorezore no Mikkagetsu); Bonus 6: "Twin Stars' Excursion" (双星回帰, Sōsei Kaiki)
12	July 4, 2017	978-4-08-881124-6	May 1, 2018	978-1-42-159909-0
41. "Women's Battle, Part 1" (女の戦い①, Onna no Tatakai 1); 42. "Women's Battle, Part 2" (女の戦い②, Onna no Tatakai 2); 43. "Dreams and Aspirations" (理想と夢と憧れと, Risō to Yume to Akogare to); 44. "Burning Down Hadarae Castle!" (爆燃烈火の波達羅盈城, Bakunen Rekka no Hadarae-jō)
13	November 2, 2017	978-4-08-881167-3	September 4, 2018	978-1-97-470145-2
45. "Welcome Back, Dr. Kanny" (おかえり、勘ちゃん先生, Okaeri, Kan-chan Sensei); 46. "Infinite Power" (無限の力, Mae e Susumi Tsudzukeru Chikara); 47. "My Name Is Not Bird Boy" (俺の名前はトリ丸ではない, Ore no Namae wa Torimaru de wa nai); 48. "The King of Loneliness" (孤独の王, Kodoku no Ō)
14	March 2, 2018	978-4-08-881364-6	January 1, 2019	978-1-97-470394-4
49. "End of the Party" (宴の終わり, Utage no Owari); 50. "Hack and Slash" (Hack & Slash); 51. "Benio and Kamui" (紅緒と神威, Benio to Kamui); 52. "The Girl's Hell" (少女の地獄, Shōjo no Jigoku)
15	June 4, 2018	978-4-08-881498-8	May 7, 2019	978-1-97-470522-1
53. "Kamui and Benio" (神威と紅緒, Kamui to Benio); 54. "Something I Want to Tell You" (君に伝えたいこと, Kimi ni Tsutaetai Koto); 55. "The Cover of Hell" (地獄の蓋, Jigoku no Futa); 56. "Despair Arrives with a Smile on Its Face" (絶望は微笑みと共に, Zetsubō wa Hohoemi to Tomo ni)
16	September 4, 2018	978-4-08-881573-2	September 3, 2019	978-1-97-470776-8
57. "Ioroi Fallen Flowers" (五百藏(いおろい)散華, Ioroi Sange); 58. "The Dream of an Ephemeral Doll" (儚いお人形の夢, Hakanai Oningyō no Yume); 59. "Promise Me One More Time" (もう一度約束を, Mō Ichido Yakusoku o); 60. "Good Night, Mother" (おやすみなさい、おかあさん, Oyasuminasai, Okaa-san)
17	December 4, 2018	978-4-08-881673-9	February 4, 2020	978-1-97-470949-6
61. "Enmado Family Versus Sh-Sh-Sh-Sh-Shiromi" (焔魔堂家 VS しししし銀鏡, Enmadō-ke Tai Shi Shi Shi Shi Shiromi); 62. "Unstoppable Force, Chief Exorcist!" (獅子奮迅、陰陽頭(のかみ), Shishi Funjin, Onmyō no Kami); 63. "Reason to Fight, Reason to Die" (戦う理由、死ぬ理由, Tatakau Riyū, Shinu Riyū); 64. "A Nonnegotiable Existence" (絶対平行線上の有無, Zettai Heikō Senjō no Umu)
18	March 4, 2019	978-4-08-881767-5	May 5, 2020	978-1-97-471075-1
65. "Farewell, Tighty-Whitey Weirdo" (変態パンツ男の最期, Hentai Pantsu Otoko no Saigo); 66. "My Father" (僕のお父さん, Boku no Otō-san); 67. "For Your Future" (君の未来のために, Kimi no Mirai no Tame ni); 68. "Okay, Let's See Who's the Strongest!" (よ〜し!じゃあこの中で誰が一番強いか勝負だ!!, Yōshi! Jaa Kono Naka de Dare ga Ichiban Tsuyoi ka Shōbu da!!)
19	July 4, 2019	978-4-08-881890-0	August 4, 2020	978-1-97-471475-9
69. "The Other Resonance" (もう一つのレゾナンス, Mō Hitotsu no Rezonansu); 70. "Tenma" (天馬); 71. "Yuto" (悠斗, Yūto); 72. "Twin Star Exorcists" (双星の陰陽師, Sōsei no Onmyōji)
20	December 4, 2019	978-4-08-882114-6	December 1, 2020	978-1-97-471768-2
73. "Stupid Big Brother" (馬鹿兄貴, Baka Aniki); 74. "The End of the Ominous Star" (破軍、終熄, Hagun, Shūsoku); 75. "The Wheel Rut of Blood" (血の轍, Chi no Wadachi); 76. "'Just Like We Always Are' Forever" (いつまでも ”いつも通り” で, Itsu Made mo "Itsumo-dōri" de)
21	March 4, 2020	978-4-08-882232-7	March 2, 2021	978-1-97-471976-1
77. "The Grown-Up Twin Stars" (双星純熟, Sōsei Junjuku); 78. "Sexually Harassing Rokuro Enmado" (焔魔堂ろくろ浮気疑惑, Enmadō Rokuro Uwaki Giwaku); 79. "The Storm of Love Returns" (恋の嵐、再び, Koi no Arashi, Futatabi); Bonus Chapter: "Shooting Star" (よばひぼし, Yobahiboshi)
22	July 3, 2020	978-4-08-882320-1	June 1, 2021	978-1-9747-2184-9
80. "Gathering of the Mighty" (強者の集い, Kyōja no Tsudoi); 81. "For Everyone (or Everything) You Care About" (大切な者（または物）のために, Taisetsu na Mono (Mata wa Mono) no Tame ni); 82. "The Means to the End" (終局の因子, Shūkyoku no Inshi); Bonus: "Twin Stars' Homecoming" (双星帰郷, Sōsei Kikyō)
23	November 4, 2020	978-4-08-882439-0	September 7, 2021	978-1-9747-2187-0
83. "Reunion" (再会, Saikai); 84. "The Vessel of Hatred, Disaster, and Friendship" (憎悪と災厄と友愛の匣, Zōo to Saiyaku to Yūai no Hako); 85. "The Twin Stars' Engagement" (双星契合, Sōsei Keigō); 86. "Hurdle of Love, Study of Love" (愛の関門、恋の師事, Ai no Kanmon, Koi no Shiji)
24	March 4, 2021	978-4-08-882587-8	January 4, 2022	978-1-9747-2708-7
87. "The Shadows That Lurk on Tsuchimikado Island" (暗影蠢く土御門, An'ei Ugomeku Tsuchimikado); 88. "Island Massacre" (虐殺の島, Gyakusatsu no Shima); 89. "The Front Line of Destruction" (滅びの最前線, Horobi no Saizensen); 90. "We're Not Gonna Take it!"
25	July 2, 2021	978-4-08-882722-3	June 21, 2022	978-1-9747-3001-8
91. "Island of Rage" (怒れる島, Ikareru Shima); 92. "Puppet Princess" (絡繰の姫, Karaku no Hime); 93. "Prince of Mimicry" (擬態王子, Gitai Ōji); 94. "The Fill-Your-Belly Splatter Festival" (どんじゃかぐちゃぐちゃ はらいっぱいまつり, Donjaka Gucha-gucha Hara Ippai Matsuri)
26	November 4, 2021	978-4-08-882829-9	October 18, 2022	978-1-9747-3399-6
95. "Heroine of the Calamitous War" (戦禍のヒロイン, Senka no Hiroin); 96. "Gabura Dissolving" (加布羅、融解, Gabura, Yūkai); 97. "Earthly Tremors" (地鳴り, Jinari); 98. "Wishing You the Saddest Happiness in the World" (世界一悲しい幸せをあなたに願う, Sekai-ichi Kanashii Shiawase wo Anata ni Negau)
27	February 4, 2022	978-4-08-883024-7	February 21, 2023	978-1-9747-3624-9
99. "Sunset" (斜陽, Shayō); 100. "Flame" (焔, Honō); 101. "A Visit to Magano" (ぶらり禍野探訪記, Burari Magano Tanbōki); 102. "Valley of Incompetence" (無能の谷, Munō no Tani)
28	June 3, 2022	978-4-08-883130-5	May 16, 2023	978-1-9747-3864-9
103. "Life" (生命(いのち), Inochi); 104. "See My Artificial Life-Form" (セイメイの模倣, Seimei no Mohō); 105. "The Melancholy of Trash" (塵屑の憂い, Gomikuzu no Urei); 106. "In the Middle" (まん中くらいが丁度いい, Mannaka Kurai ga Chōdo Ii)
29	September 2, 2022	978-4-08-883235-7	October 17, 2023	978-1-9747-4069-7
107. "The Part of Me I Hate" (わたしのだいきらいなわたし, Watashi no Daikirai na Watashi); 108. "Peace Offering" (ピースサイン, Pīsu Sain); 109. "The Last Banquet" (最後の宴, Saigo no Utage); 110. "A Flower Blooming in Hell" (地獄に咲く花, Jigoku ni Saku Hana)
30	January 4, 2023	978-4-08-883343-9	February 20, 2024	978-1-9747-4311-7
111. "A Happy Ending" (幸せな結末, Shiawase na Ketsumatsu); 112. "Sin" (罪, Tsumi); 113. "A Marital Spat in the Heavens" (天翔ける夫婦喧嘩, Amakakeru Fūfu Kenka); 114. "Punishment" (罰, Batsu)
31	May 2, 2023	978-4-08-883495-5	May 21, 2024	978-1-9747-4593-7
115. "Soul Summon" (魂喚(たまよばい), Tamayobai); 116. "May You Die an Awful Death" (もっとも醜い死をあなたに, Mottomo Minikui Shi o Anata ni); 117. "The Burden of Life" (命の計り方, Inochi no Hakarikata); 118. "The Ascension of Gabura" (加布羅、昇天, Gabura, Shōten)
32	September 4, 2023	978-4-08-883638-6	November 19, 2024	978-1-9747-4917-1
119. "Those Who Are Trusted and Those Who You Trust" (託される者、託す者, Takusareru Mono, Takusu Mono); 120. "Chain of Old Scores" (宿怨の連鎖, Shukuen no Rensa); 121. "Sacrifice"; 122. "A Single Drop of Righteousness" (たった一滴の“正”, Tatta Itteki no “Sei”)
33	February 2, 2024	978-4-08-883777-2	February 18, 2025	978-1-9747-5200-3
123. "The Adventures of Alice the Crybaby" (泣き虫ありすの大冒険, Nakimushi Arisu no Daibōken); 124. "The Pride of a Threadbare Rag" (ボロ雑巾の矜持(プライド), Boro Zōkin no Puraido); 125. "Clearing the Darkness" (闇を雪ぐ, Yami o Sosogu); 126. "If Only I'd Realized Then That It Was Love" (あの日それが愛だと気づいていれば, Ano Hi Sore ga Ai da to Kizuite Ireba)
34	July 4, 2024	978-4-08-884045-1	July 15, 2025	978-1-9747-5593-6
127. "Huh?!" (んん!?, Nn!?); 128. "My Sister's Happiness" (妹の幸せ, Imōto no Shiawase); 129. "In the Center of Bright, Shining Magano" (光る禍野のまん中で, Hikaru Magano no Mannaka de); 130. "A Future Without Guideposts" (標なき未来, Shirube Naki Mirai)
35	November 1, 2024	978-4-08-884219-6	October 21, 2025	978-1-9747-5873-9
131. "The Pure Light That Exorcises the Darkness" (まっ白な闇を祓う, Masshirona Yami o Harau); 132. "Screams from Beyond" (彼方からの悲鳴, Kanata kara no Himei); 133. "A Warm Wind" (あたたかい風, Atatakai Kaze); 134. "The Birthing Cry of the Universe, the Joy of the Stars" (宇宙(そら)の産声、星の歓喜, Sora no Ugoe, Hoshi no Kanki)

== Chapters not in tankōbon format ==
- 39.1. "Special Chapter: Awaken Mayura's Dormant Fangs!!"

== Spin-off manga ==
The first spin-off manga series, Sōsei no Onmyōji: SD Nyoritsuryō!! (双星の陰陽師 SD如律令!!) is a comedy spin-off comic, written by koppy and supervised by Yoshiaki Sukeno. It was published at the official website of the original manga, as well as the magazine Saikyō Jump. The content of this manga is canon, showing personalities of many characters. The compiled volume was published and released on March 3, 2017, in Japan.

The second spin-off manga series, Sōsei no Onmyōji: Tenen Jakko: Nishoku Kokkeiga (双星の陰陽師 天縁若虎〜二色滑稽画) is a manga adaptation of the light novel, "Sōsei no Onmyōji: Tenen Jakko", written and illustrated by the same authors. The back-story focuses on the characters, Seigen Amawaka and Yukari Otomi. The spin-off series was launched by Yoshiaki Sukeno on Shueisha's Shonen Jump+ website on September 3, 2018. The compiled volume was published and released on December 4, 2018, in Japan.

No.	Japanese release date	Japanese ISBN
1	March 3, 2017	978-4-08-881032-4
2	December 4, 2018	978-4-08-881676-0

== Light novels ==
Three light novel adaptations have been published and released by Shueisha under its Jump J-Books imprint from August 4, 2016, to December 4, 2018. The light novels are Sōsei no Onmyōji: Tenen Jakko (双星の陰陽師 ―天縁若虎), Sōsei no Onmyōji: Shiga Kenbyaku (双星の陰陽師 ―士牙繭闢) and Sōsei no Onmyōji: Santen Haja (双星の陰陽師 ―三天破邪). Each novel features a back-story from the perspective of different characters from the main series, serving as prologues to the main story. They were written by Hajime Tanaka and supervised by Sukeno.

No.	Japanese release date	Japanese ISBN
1	August 4, 2016	978-4-08-703402-8
2	March 3, 2017	978-4-08-703415-8
3	December 4, 2018	978-4-08-703467-7
