= 根本 =

根本, meaning "root, origin", may refer to:

- "Deep Down", a name of chapter 15 in Japanese manga Gachiakuta
- Nemoto, Japanese surname

== See also ==
- The dictionary definition of 根 at Wiktionary
- The dictionary definition of 本 at Wiktionary
- Deep Down (disambiguation)
