= Masaya Takatsuka =

Japanese voice actor (born 1969)

- Born: August 15, 1969 (age 56); Kakogawa, Hyōgo Prefecture, Japan
- Occupation: Voice actor
- Years active: 1996–present
- Spouse: Keiko Nemoto (m. 2012)
- Children: 1

Masaya Takatsuka (高塚 正也, Takatsuka Masaya; born August 15, 1969 in Hyōgo Prefecture) is a Japanese voice actor. He is married to voice actress Keiko Nemoto.

== Filmography ==
=== Television animation ===
1990s

- Record of Lodoss War: Chronicles of the Heroic Knight (1998) - Garrack

2000s

- Miami Guns (2000) - Takuro
- One Piece (2000) - Johnny, Mr. 5, Mr. 4, Van Auger, Gedatsu, Yokozuna, Jabra, Gyro, Devil Dias, Avalo Pizarro, Vista, others
- Baki the Grappler (2001) - Yuri Chakovsky
- Captain Tsubasa: Road to 2002 (2001) - Hiroshi Jito
- Inuyasha (2002) - Shūran
- Witch Hunter Robin (2002) - Willem
- Groove Adventure Rave (2002) - Franken Billy
- Hungry Heart: Wild Striker (2002) - Kōji Sakai Jefferson
- Air Master (2003) - Baba, Hanai
- FireStorm (2003) - Sam Scott
- Papuwa - Tanno
- Bobobo-bo Bo-bobo (2003) - Geha the Gale, Hiroshi, Indus Civilization, Wan Ronga
- Area 88 (2004) - Greg Gates
- Ginga Densetsu Weed (2005) - Jerome
- Yu-Gi-Oh! Duel Monsters GX (2006) - Professor Cobra
- Onegai My Melody: KuruKuru Shuffle! (2006) - Dar-kun
- Gegege no Kitarō (2007) - Tsurubebi
- Blue Dragon (2007) - Blue Dragon
- Blue Dragon: Trials of the Seven Shadows (2008) - Blue Dragon

2010s

- Kingdom (2012) - Pang Nuan
- Samurai Warriors (2015) - Naoe Kanetsugu
- World Trigger (2015) - Tatsuya Kuruma
- Twin Star Exorcists (2016) - Narumi Ioroi
- Dragon Ball Super (2016) - Great Priest, Rensō
- Black Clover (2017) - Vetto

2020s

- Uchitama?! Have you seen my Tama? (2020) - Tomekichi Kiso
- Digimon Ghost Game (2021) - Unimon, Saberdramon, Sangloupmon, Manticoremon

Unknown date

- Mobile Suit Gundam SEED Destiny: Special Edition - Captain Baba

=== Theatrical animation ===
- Princess Arete (2001) - Elder Counsellor, Suitor
- One Piece Movie: The Desert Princess and the Pirates: Adventures in Alabasta (2007) - Mr. 4

=== Original video animation (OVA) ===
- Hijikata Toshizō: Shiro no Kiseki (2004) - Takeaki Enomoto
- Iriya no Sora, UFO no Natsu (2005) - Taizō Kawaguchi
- The Prince of Tennis: The National Tournament (2007) - Gin Ishida

=== Video games ===
- Langrisser IV (1997) - Krueger
- Langrisser V: The End of Legend (1998) - Marquis Quade
- Samurai Warriors series (2004–present) - Kanetsugu Naoe, Kanbei Kuroda
- Kessen III (2004) - Niwa Nagahide
- Critical Velocity (2005) - Guy
- Soulcalibur III (2005) - Arthur, Girardot Argezas, Li Long
- Dragon Shadow Spell (2007) - Gawain Grandheart
- Warriors Orochi series (2007–present) - Kanetsugu Naoe, Kanbei Kuroda
- Kid Icarus: Uprising (2012) - Hewdraw

=== Tokusatsu ===
- Kyuukyuu Sentai GoGoFive (1999) - Bushido Psyma Beast Hagakuren (ep. 38)
- Kamen Rider OOO Hyper Battle DVD (2011) - Bison Yummy, Shachi-Panda Yummy

=== Dubbing ===
- Action League Now! - Stinky Diver
- Power Rangers in Space - Jakarak
- Rocko's Modern Life - Filburt
