= Henriette Puig-Roget =

- Born: 9 January 1910; Bastia, Corsica
- Died: 24 November 1992 (aged 82); Paris
- Education: Conservatoire de Paris
- Occupations: Classical organist; Music educator
- Organizations: Grand Synagogue of Paris; Conservatoire de Paris; Tokyo University of the Arts; L'Oratoire du Louvre; Paris Opera
- Awards: Prix de Rome

Henriette Marie Eulalie Puig-Roget (9 January 1910 – 24 November 1992) was a French pianist, organist, composer and music educator.

== Biography ==
Born in Bastia, she began her musical studies at the Conservatoire de Paris in 1919. She won 6 first prizes between 1926 and 1930 in the classes of Isidore Philipp, Jean Gallon and Noël Gallon, Maurice Emmanuel and Marcel Dupré: piano, harmony, music history, piano accompaniment, counterpoint, fugue, organ. She was also a student of Charles Tournemire in chamber music. She also received congratulations for her composition Suite sur un thème de l'office de Noël in the 1930 Amis de l'Orgue competition.

First Second Grand Prix de Rome in 1933, she was appointed the following year organist of the Oratoire du Louvre and the Grand Synagogue of Paris. She remained there until 1979 and 1952 respectively. As conductor of singing at the Opéra de Paris, she pursued a parallel career as a pianist on the radio from 1935, where she remained until 1975.

Henriette Roget, now Mrs. Ramon Puig-Vinyals, taught accompaniment at the Conservatoire de Paris from 1957. In 1979, she left to teach piano, music theory and chamber music at the Tokyo University of the Arts in Japan. Among her students from this Tokyo period were Kazuoki Fujii (pianist), Takenori Nemoto (French horn player), Hideki Nagano (pianist), Masakazu Natsuda (composer), Misato Mochizuki (composer) and Mami Sakato (organist).
