= Nemoto =

Nemoto (written: 根本 or 根元) is a Japanese surname. Notable people with the surname include.

- Haruka Nemoto (根本 悠楓, born 2003), Japanese baseball player
- Harumi Nemoto (根本 はるみ, born 1980), Japanese gravure idol
- Haruno Nemoto (根本 葉瑠乃, born 1995), Japanese basketball player
- Hiroshi Nemoto (根本 博, 1891–1966), Japanese lieutenant general
- Kae Nemoto (根本 香絵), Japanese physicist
- Keiko Nemoto (根本 圭子, born 1979), Japanese voice actress
- Keisuke Nemoto (根本 敬介, born 1979), Japanese karateka
- Mitsuyo Nemoto (根本 美鶴代, born 1958), Japanese singer and actress
- Miyari Nemoto (根本 京里), Japanese voice actress
- Nagi Nemoto (根本 凪, born 1999), Japanese singer-songwriter and actress
- Nami Nemoto (根本 奈美, born 1975), Japanese speed skater
- Naoko Nemoto (根本 七保子, born 1940), Japanese socialite, businesswoman, television personality
- Rikuo Nemoto (根本 陸夫, 1926–1999), Japanese former baseball player and manager
- Ritsuko Nemoto (根本 りつ子, born 1959), Japanese actress
- Ryosuke Nemoto (根本 亮助, born 1980), Japanese former footballer
- Ryō Nemoto (根本 凌, born 2000), Japanese footballer
- Seiji Nemoto (根本 誠次, born 1961), Japanese former wrestler
- Shunichi Nemoto (根元 俊一, born 1983), Japanese former baseball player
- Takashi Nemoto (根本 敬, born 1958), Japanese comics artist and illustrator
- Takenori Nemoto (根本 雄伯, born 1969), Japanese French horn player, classical composer, conductor, music educator
- Taku Nemoto (根本 拓, born 1986), Japanese politician
- Takumi Nemoto (根本 匠, born 1951), Japanese former politician
- Tomohisa Nemoto (根本 朋久, born 1986), Japanese baseball player
- Yuichi Nemoto (根本 裕一, born 1981), Japanese former footballer
- Yuki Nemoto (根本 悠生, born 1996), Japanese racing driver

== Fictional characters ==
- Kyōji Nemoto (根本 恭二), a character in the light novel series Baka and Test

== See also ==
- Nemoto Station, a railway station in Tajimi, Gifu Prefecture, Japan
