= Antoine Curé =

French trumpeter (born 1951)

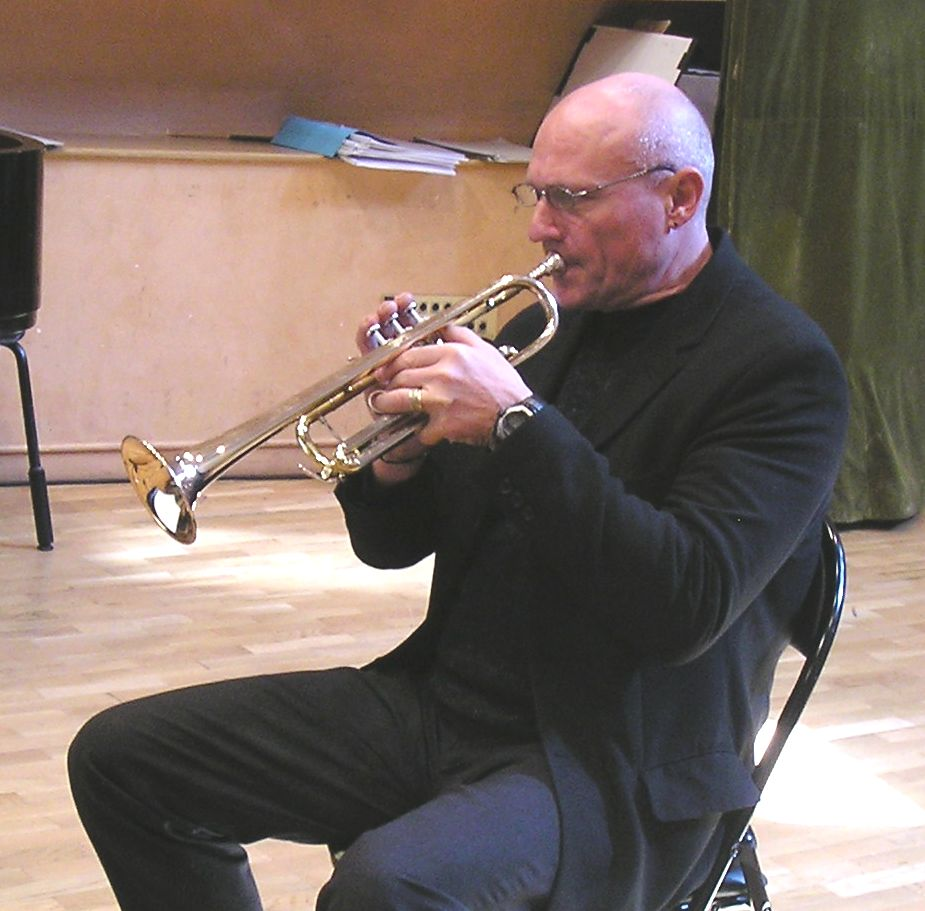
Image of Antoine Curé

Antoine Curé (born 11 April 1951) is a French classical trumpeter. He is a professor at the Conservatoire de Paris.

== Life ==
Curé started learning the trumpet at the music school in Bayeux. He furthered his studies at the conservatories of Caen and Grenoble.

In 1970, he entered the Conservatoire de Paris in Ludovic Vaillant's class. There he won two First Prizes: trumpet and chamber music.

He won the gold medal at the G. Viotti International Competition in Italy, as well as the 2nd prize at the Toulon International Competition. He is also a winner of the Fondation de la vocation.

First solo trumpet at the Concerts Colonne, he joined the Ensemble intercontemporain as a soloist in 1981 under the direction of Pierre Boulez. He held this position until December 2012.

He was a professor at the Conservatory of Ville-d'Avray.

In 1988, Curé was appointed a professor at the Conservatoire de Paris.

He is regularly invited to the summer academies of Nice, Orford (Canada) and in Japan.

He has participated in many recordings as an orchestral musician but also as a soloist, notably with the Concertos for Trumpet by Johann Melchior Molter, Bach's 2nd Brandenburg Concertos. He also made a record of the three trumpet concertos by Jean-Michel Defaye.

In 1994, he premiered Midtown, for two trompets, by Philippe Fénelon, as well as the French premiere of Hans Werner Henze's Requiem in 1996. He also premiered Metal Extension by Yan Maresz, 2005 in Tokyo by Masakazu Natsuda, and La couche du temps for trumpet solo by Hitomi Kaneko.
