= Blue Dragon (TV series) =

Japanese anime television series

- Key visual for the series, featuring (from left to right) Jiro, Kluke, Shu, Bouquet, Marumaro, Zola, and Blue Dragon (back)
- Genre: Adventure; Fantasy comedy
- Created by: Mistwalker
- Anime television series
- Directed by: Yukihiro Matsushita
- Written by: Akatsuki Yamatoya
- Music by: Megumi Oohashi; Nobuo Uematsu
- Studio: Studio Pierrot
- Licensed by: NA: Viz Media; UK: Manga Entertainment
- Original network: TXN (TV Tokyo)
- English network: CA: YTV; SEA: Animax Asia; US: Cartoon Network (Toonami)
- Original run: April 7, 2007 – March 29, 2008
- Episodes: 51
- Anime television series

Blue Dragon: Trials of the Seven Shadows
- Directed by: Yukihiro Matsushita
- Written by: Akatsuki Yamatoya
- Music by: Megumi Oohashi; Nobuo Uematsu
- Studio: Studio Pierrot
- Licensed by: NA: Viz Media; UK: Manga Entertainment
- Original network: TXN (TV Tokyo)
- English network: SEA: Animax Asia
- Original run: April 5, 2008 – March 28, 2009
- Episodes: 51
- Other series
- Ral Grad (manga)
- Video games
- Blue Dragon (2006); Blue Dragon Plus (2008); Blue Dragon: Awakened Shadow (2009)
- icon

Blue Dragon (stylized in all caps) is a Japanese anime television series adaptation of the video game series Blue Dragon by Mistwalker. The series was produced by Studio Pierrot and broadcast on TV Tokyo. The first season ran for 51 episodes from April 2007 to March 2008. The second season, titled Blue Dragon: Trials of the Seven Shadows, ran for 51 episodes from April 2008 to March 2009. In North America, the series was licensed by Viz Media.

== Plot ==
As Shu's village was being attacked by an unknown enemy, he and his friends, Jiro and Kluke decide to defend their home. They soon meet Zola and receive the powers of Shadow, an ability that lets them transform their shadow into a powerful monster. Shu receives one of the most powerful monsters, Blue Dragon, and they all set out to defeat their enemy.

== Characters ==
Shu (シュウ, Shū)
Voiced by: Keiko Nemoto (Japanese); Yuri Lowenthal (English)
The main protagonist of the series, Shu is an impulsive and adventurous kid. Originally from the fictional village of Talta, Shu does not give up in the face of adversity and it is thanks to his stubbornness that he will be able to defeat evil. Despite all the small flaws that make him up, Shu is honest, loyal, selfless and courageous. He has a great sense of duty and friendship and love are very important to him. He often happens to say stupid things or get lost in long speeches. Shu's shadow is Blue Dragon, one of the seven shadows of light, who will join him in the fight against the forces of evil.
Blue Dragon (ブルードラゴン, Burū Doragon)
Voiced by: Masaya Takatsuka (Japanese); Lex Lang (English)
The titular blue-colored dragon who is Shu's shadow.
Jiro (ジーロ)
Voiced by: Daisuke Namikawa (Japanese); Sam Regal (English)
Jiro is a skillful and strong boy, gifted with a certain technique and strategy, who however has only one major flaw, which Zola repeatedly accuses him of; he is much too impulsive, almost more than Shu. He is motivated to defeat Nene by a great desire for revenge, as he is responsible for the destruction of his village Muffei and the death of his family at the hands of General Szabo's forces. His shadow is Minotaur, which he discovers he owns after the destruction of his village. Initially he has an arrogant and individualistic attitude, but overtime, he will open up more to other people, becoming more kind and helpful.
Minotaur (ミノタウロス, Minotaurosu)
Voiced by: Kōji Ochiai (Japanese); Kirk Thornton (English)
A green-furred Minotaur who is Jiro's shadow. Jiro discovered him after the destruction of Muffei.
Kluke (クルック, Kurukku)
Voiced by: Erino Hazuki (Japanese); Michelle Ruff (English)
She is the best friend of Shu, a little girl expert in mechanics. She is good, sensitive, cautious but also easy to get angry (at least in the first season of the anime). Over the course of the story, she becomes close friends with both Bouquet and Jiro, who ends up feeling a great affection for her, because she reminds him of her younger sister. She is initially very jealous of the interactions between Shu and Bouquet, but will eventually cease to be. Kluke falls in love with Andropov, during the final episodes of the first season.
Phoenix (フェニックス, Fenikkusu)
Voiced by: Konomi Tsuboi (Japanese); Michelle Ruff (English)
A purple and pink Phoenix who is Kluke's shadow. Phoenix can enable Kluke to teleport large numbers of people and use forcefields.
Marumaro (マルマロ)
Voiced by: Sakiko Uran (Japanese); Martin Klein (English)
Marumaro is a Devee that Shu and his friends meet shortly after they leave Talta village. His shadow is Saber Tiger. Marumaro usually has an immature and casual demeanor, fascinated by beautiful girls, including Bouquet, although he still shows he has a big heart and is always ready to help his friends. During the battles he never backs down, calling himself the "champion of justice" each time.
Saber Tiger (サーベルタイガー, Sarberu Taigar)
Voiced by: Jin Horikawa (Japanese); Neil Kaplan (English)
A humanoid smilodon who is Marumaro's shadow. Its most dangerous ability is its surprising speed.
Bouquet (ブーケ, Buke)
Voiced by: Saki Nakajima (Japanese); Melissa Fahn (English)
She is a girl in love with Shu, who claims to be his girlfriend. Sometimes she is a little distracted, but also sensitive and more attentive to the feelings of others than she seems. Overall, Bouquet is very cheerful and kind. Her shadow is Hippopotamus. Bouquet belongs to the Ra Clan where she has the power to make herself invisible, but not her clothes, and therefore has to undress to disappear. In the second series, Bouquet gets the bonding ability from Noi, which will allow her to increase the power of Blue Dragon and Saber Tiger by giving them superior armor and strength.
Hippopotamus (ヒポポタマス, Hipopotamasu)
Voiced by: Chō (Japanese); Michael Sorich (English)
A humanoid hippopotamus with bat-like wings who is Bouquet's shadow. He can unite with her so that they can shapeshift into any person, animal or object. When Bouquet gets the bonding ability from Noi during the second season, she and Hippopotamus can increase the power of Blue Dragon and Saber Tiger.
Zola (ゾラ, Zora)
Voiced by: Romi Park (Japanese); Cindy Robinson (English)
She is a pirate of the skies and the final antagonist in the finale of the first anime series. She is cold and detached, always in control of the situation. She has white, waist-length hair, a dark complexion and a saber from which she never separates. Her shadow is the Killer Bat, which she obtained when she, Nene and her father visited the ruins dedicated to it. It was here that her father died protecting her from a landslide, and Zola, desperate, succumbed to the darkness and fell under their control. Darkness will engulf most of the world, until Shu and the others defeat them. In the second series, it was revealed that the good that was purged by Killer Bat was found by Dr. Tarkovsky who used it to create his "granddaughter", Primella.
Killer Bat (キラーバット, Kira Bat)
Voiced by: Hōchū Ōtsuka (Japanese); Richard Epcar (English)
A humanoid bat who is Zola's shadow. Killer Bat remained silent until the goal to release the darkness was made known. Its real goal is to restore the world to its original state, which is darkness, in which there is neither light nor shadow. He will succeed in this regard by deceiving all the descendants of the knights of the light, or his traveling companions plus Logi and Deathroy.
Noi (ノイ)
Voiced by: Hitomi Nabatame (Japanese); Katie Leigh (English)
A young member of the Investiture Beings who befriends Shu and Bouquet. He can turn into a black dragon. Unlike the rest of the Investiture Beings, Noi cannot bring his dragon form out in shadow form.

== Production ==
Akira Toriyama, character designer for the Blue Dragon video game, said that Studio Pierrot approached him about an anime adaptation in February 2006. In his own words, he said:

I knew that [Hironobu] Sakaguchi had been working on assembling staff to produce a game, although at the time Blue Dragon hadn't yet been formally announced. According to the materials, it was to be a fantasy world like Lord of the Rings, with a detailed world view and story. This may be my final anime, I'm a little worried (about it). There's incredible pressure, but at the same time, there's a sense of accomplishment – that it's worth doing. Blue Dragon will be a masterpiece, not simply because I'm working hard on it, but because the staff is expecting nothing less.

== Release ==
Based on the namesake video game series (although including several divergences from the original work), the anime adaptation was announced in November 2006. Directed by Yukihiro Matsushita, written by Akatsuki Yamatoya, animated by studio Pierrot and co-produced by TV Tokyo and Pierrot, the series was broadcast for 51 episodes on TV Tokyo from April 7, 2007, to March 29, 2008.

A second season, Blue Dragon: Trials of the Seven Shadows (BLUE DRAGON 天界の七竜, Burū Doragon: Tenkai no Shichiryū), was broadcast for fifty-one episodes from April 5, 2008, to March 28, 2009.

In 2007, Viz Media licensed the series for release in North America and Europe. An edited English language dub of the series premiered in the United States on Cartoon Network, on April 5, 2008. It also aired on Cartoon Network's Toonami Jetstream service until Jetstream was cancelled on January 30, 2009. Since then it has been discovered that Viz Media did make an uncut version of the Blue Dragon anime in English. This uncut version released by Manga Entertainment had the first 24 episodes released on DVD (exclusively in the UK) over three 2 disc DVD sets with the release date of further DVD sets cancelled due to lack of sales. These uncut episodes, unlike the US DVD releases, fully restore the original Japanese opening and closing, all edited scenes from the Cartoon Network version are restored including the original music, as well as having the option to view the series in Japanese with English subtitles. On July 22, 2011, Viz Media started streaming Blue Dragon episodes on VizAnime Tubi, and Hulu. At Otakon, Viz Media representative Amy Mar said at the time that if the streaming numbers are good, they might release the uncut episodes on physical media.
