= Hideki Nagano =

Japanese pianist

Hideki Nagano (born 1968) is a Japanese classical pianist. He has been a member of the Ensemble intercontemporain since 1995 and lives in France.

== Biography ==
Nagano was born in Nagoya. He studied at the University of Tokyo in particular with Henriette Puig-Roget.

He arrived Paris in 1988 without speaking much French, and prepared for the entrance exam to the Conservatoire de Paris. He studied piano with Jean-Claude Pennetier and vocal accompaniment with Anne Grappotte then with Jean Kœrner.

== Recordings ==
- Hideki Nagano plays Boulez — Messiaen — Murail — Dutilleux, Fontec, 1997
- Hideki Nagano plays Prokofiev — Messiaen — Murail, Nippon Columbia, 1998
- George Antheil, La Femme 100 têtes — Sonatina — Jazz sonata , Pianovox, October 1998
- Tōru Takemitsu: Chamber music, BIS Records, November 1998
- Maurice Ravel, Piano works, Nippon Columbia, 2001
- Bechara El-Khoury, Waves, Op. 60, on the New York, Tears and Hope / The Rivers Engulfed records, Naxos Records, September 2006
- Jonathan Harvey: Bird concerto with pianosong, recorded at the Warsaw Autumn Festival on 19 September 2009, NMC Recordings, October 2011
- Pierre Boulez, Une page d'éphéméride, in Complete Works, Deutsche Grammophon, 2013

=== With the Modulations Trio ===
- Bruno Mantovani, Da Roma, on the Art d'écho record, Sismal records, 2007

=== With the Ensemble intercontemporain ===
- Philippe Manoury, La Partition du ciel et de l'enfer, Adès, 1997
- Pierre Boulez, Sur Incises, Deutsche Grammophon, 2000
- Pierre Boulez, Pli selon pli, Deutsche Grammophon, 2002
- Bruno Mantovani, Éclair de Lune, Kairos, 2008
- Pierre Jodlowski, Drones — Barbarismes, Kairos, 2011
- Yann Robin, Art of metal II, Kairos, 2012
