= Deep Down =

Deep Down may refer to:

- Deep Down (album), a 1995 album by blues musician Carey Bell
- "Deep Down" (song), a single by Pam Tillis from the album All of This Love
- Deep Down (video game), an upcoming PlayStation 4 role-playing video game by Capcom
- "Deep Down" (Angel), the first television episode from Angel's fourth season
- Deep Down (film), a 1994 film
- Deep Down, a 2022 song by Alok (DJ), Ella Eyre and Kenny Dope ft. Never Dull
