= Takenori Nemoto =

- Born: 1969 (age 56–57); Kamakura, Japan
- Occupations: Musician, composer, conductor
- Instrument: French horn

Takenori Nemoto (根本 雄伯, Nemoto Takenori; born 1969 in Kamakura) is a Japanese French horn player, composer, conductor, and music educator.

== Early life ==
In 1969, Nemoto was born in Kamakura, Japan. Nemoto began his musical training at age 3. By age 15, Nemoto began his study in music composition and horn.

== Education ==
Nemoto earned a bachelor of music degree from the Tokyo University of the Arts, where he was trained by Henriette Puig-Roget, a French pianist and music educator.

In 1992, Nemoto attended the École Normale de Musique de Paris in Paris. Nemoto was trained by Georges Barboteu and Françoise Buffet-Arsenijevic.

== Career ==
In 2004, Nemoto's composition "Annunciation for flute and harp" received an award at the International Music Tournament in Rome.

In 2007, Nemoto performed as a soloist at the Théâtre du Châtelet in Paris, France.

In 2018, Nemoto was a conductor for musicals such as Cendrillon and Madama Butterfly with Ensemble Musica Nigella.

=== Music educator ===
From 2005 to 2015, Nemoto was a horn instructor at the Conservatoire de Musique in Cachan, Paris, France.

In 2007, Nemoto was invited to teach horn, chamber music, orchestra and conducting at Aichi Prefectural University of the Arts in Nagakute, Aichi, Japan.

In 2018, Nemoto became an instructor at the Conservatoire de Bordeaux.

== Filmography ==
- Nana (1926) - Credited as himself in Music Department, musician-horn.
- 2004 Le docteur Ox - Credited as Cor/trompette.

== Awards ==
- 1998 Winner of Cor de Trévoux International Competition, 3rd place.
- 2000 Winner of International Competition Premio Rovere d'Oro, 2nd place.
- 2003 Winner of International Competition "Henri Tomasi" Marseille, 2nd place.
- 2023 Prix Henri Hie of the Académie des Sciences, Belles-lettres et Arts de Rouen

== See also ==
- Maurice Bourgue - Nemoto's instructor (1999-2001)
