= Keiko Nemoto =

Japanese voice actress

- 根本 圭子
- Born: December 10, 1979 (age 46); Chiba Prefecture, Japan
- Occupation: Voice actress
- Years active: 2000–present
- Agent: 81 Produce
- Spouse: Masaya Takatsuka (m. 2012)
- Children: 1

Keiko Nemoto (根本 圭子, Nemoto Keiko; born December 10, 1979) is a Japanese voice actress from Chiba and affiliated with 81 Produce. She is married to voice actor Masaya Takatsuka.

== Filmography ==
=== Television animation ===
- Blue Dragon (2007) – Shu
- Gintama (xxxx) – Murata Tetsuko
- Glass Mask (xxxx) – female teacher, Ikeda, Shopkeeper, Sugiyama, Yayoi, Zophie (2005 version)
- Hell Girl (xxxx) – Satsuki Minato, Minami's mother
- Lunar Legend Tsukihime (xxxx) – Shiki Tohno (as a child)
- Mirmo Zibang! (xxxx) – Mambo
- Naruto (xxxx) – Shizune, young Neji Hyuga, Yūgao Uzuki, Tonton
- Rockman.EXE (xxxx) – Bass.EXE (Forte.EXE)
- The Story of Saiunkoku (2006) – Boy 2

=== Animated films ===
- Tekken: Blood Vengeance (2011) – Mokujin
- The Last: Naruto the Movie (2014) – Shizune

=== Video games roles ===
- Mega Man Network Transmission (xxxx) – Bass.EXE (Forte.EXE)
- Teppen (2024) – Bass.EXE

=== Drama CDs roles ===
- Amai Tsumi no Kajitsu (xxxx) – Kurihara's Mother

=== Dubbing roles ===
==== Live-action ====
- 42 – Rachel Isum Robinson (Nicole Beharie)
- Aliens in the Attic – Art Pearson (Henri Young)
- Black Nativity – Naima Cobbs (Jennifer Hudson)
- Crazy, Stupid, Love – Hannah Weaver (Emma Stone)
- El tiempo entre costuras – Paquita (Pepa Rus)
- Event 15 – Blau (Kimberly Elise)
- Fever Pitch – Molly (Ione Skye)
- The House Bunny – Natalie (Emma Stone)
- Hustlers – Elizabeth (Julia Stiles)
- Joy Ride 2: Dead Ahead – Kayla Scott (Laura Jordan)
- Lilacs – Marianna (Miriam Sekhon)
- Malignant – Detective Regina Moss (Michole Briana White)
- Nope – Emerald "Em" Haywood (Keke Palmer)
- Numb – Dawn (Stefanie von Pfetten)
- Premium Rush – Vanessa (Dania Ramirez)
- Ramona and Beezus – Beezus Quimby (Selena Gomez)
- The Sandlot: Heading Home – Tommy Santorelli (Keanu Pires)
- The Secret Life of Bees – Rosaleen "July" Daise (Jennifer Hudson)
- Sex and the City – Louise (Jennifer Hudson)
- The Three Stooges – Lydia Harter (Sofía Vergara)
- The Uninvited – Alex Ivers (Arielle Kebbel)
- Vehicle 19 – Rachel Shabangu (Naima McLean)

==== Animation ====
- Batman: The Brave and the Bold – Vixen
- Bob the Builder – Trix
- Bob the Builder (2015 TV series) – Muck
- The Boondocks – Riley Freeman
- Dead End: Paranormal Park – Roxie
- The Fairly OddParents – Tootie
- Jimmy Two-Shoes – Jimmy
- Phineas and Ferb – Baljeet
- Thomas And Friends – Molly, Belle, Gina, Daisy (succeeding Yumi Nakatani), Henrietta (succeeding Yumi Nakatani), Hannah, Elizabeth (succeeding Fu Suzuki), Jack (replacing Hideki Nakanishi), Dowager Hatt (succeeding Fu Suzuki) and Stephen Hatt (replacing Takayuki Kawasugi)
- Zootopia – Mrs. Otterton
