= List of Twin Star Exorcists characters =

The following is a list of characters from the manga series Twin Star Exorcists, written and illustrated by Yoshiaki Sukeno.

== Characters ==
=== Twin Star Exorcists ===
The Twin Star Exorcists (双星の陰陽師, Sōsei no Onmyōji) are a couple of exorcists destined to be the parents of the "Miko", the reincarnation of Abe no Seimei and the ultimate exorcist, who is said to be capable of cleansing every kind of evil spirit. The Twin Star Exorcists also have a special ability called "Resonance", which allows them to combine their powers to increase the strength of their attacks or access abilities that no other exorcists possess. It is also revealed that the Twin Stars are not proper exorcists, but rather "Vessels" created by Abe no Seimei and Ashiya Dōman. They do not have guardian spirits; rather, their powers come from the world around them. The Male Twin Star <Sol>, created by Seimei (in this case, Rokuro), is a vessel for Yang energy, and the Female Twin Star <Luna>, created by Dōman (in this case, Benio), is a vessel for Yin energy. Both energies normally act as opposites, but it is only through a fusion of both powers that the Miko <Taiji> is born. The Miko is not a reincarnation of any spirit, but rather an embodiment of the two powers in one form.

Rokuro Enmado (焔魔堂 ろくろ, Enmadō Rokuro)
Voiced by: Natsuki Hanae (Japanese); Bryce Papenbrook (English)
The main protagonist. A brash and headstrong 14-year-old exorcist who was once motivated to become the strongest and cleanse all Kegare and sins. Rokuro was found by Seigen in Magano when he was 6 years old and had no memory of his past, after which Ryougo took him in. In the manga, he grew up in a valley of Basara before being found and taken in by humans. However, Yuuto Ijika caused a tragedy at the Hiinatsuki Dormitory that forced Rokuro to take the lives of his friends who had been forcibly corrupted. Following this, his right arm was also corrupted and became part Impurity, gaining great offensive power. This tragedy made him nearly abandon exorcism until he met Benio, who inspired him to fight as an exorcist again. Despite not liking the idea of being her groom at first, he later develops feelings for her. During the time skip, Rokuro advances his studies and training, making him popular in high school. Rokuro becomes the head of the former Adashino House on Tsuchimikado Island. At the climax of the Kegare's escape to the surface, Rokuro and Benio are reunited after a long separation. Benio's fate as an Impurity doesn't change Rokuro's feelings for her. The pair live peacefully on the island for four years. Rokuro soon obtains a fragment of Yuuto's yang energy that partially awakens his own transformation. After persuading the islanders to overlook Benio's misconduct, she and Rokuro officially get married. When Benio could not keep her promise, Rokuro lost hope and fully transformed into the <Sol>. After receiving encouragement from Seigen, Rokuro sets out into Magano to locate his wife and forms a party with the redeemed Kamui and Suzu. While rediscovering his childhood home, Rokuro unknowingly kills Sutara, the Basara who raised him out of pity. Sutara's wife, Asuha, accepts Rokuro's generosity despite their differences. Rokuro is a descendant of Abe no Seimei. Once Benio is freed from her madness and King Kegare is temporarily suspended, she and Rokuro are taken into a time-accelerating dome to conceive the prophesied child, Hikaru. After sealing themselves to suppress King Kegare, he and Benio do not see their son again until Hikaru performs a reunion spell so they can embrace.
In the manga, it is eventually revealed that the Twin Stars are not truly human, and Rokuro is a vessel for Yang energy. He was created by Abe no Seimei, her son, so it appears as though his guardian spirit is Seimei, but in reality, neither he nor Benio has a guardian spirit. In the anime, he is actually the Hajo-ó (Cataclysm King or Star Destroyer King), an extremely powerful Impurity created by Abe no Seimei that is destined to wipe out humanity if it becomes a threat to the world.
Benio Adashino (化野 紅緒, Adashino Benio)
Voiced by: Megumi Han (Japanese); Cassandra Lee Morris (English)
The main heroine, a serious 14-year-old girl, she vowed to become the strongest exorcist and destroy all Kegare to avenge her parents, who died protecting her. She wears a fox mask in battle. Upon meeting Rokuro, she inspires him to return to being an exorcist and, despite not agreeing with the idea of becoming his bride, she secretly admires him for his tenacity, calling it is his sole redeeming quality. Benio has a preference for ohagi. She admires her brother Yuuto until she learns his true nature. She loses both of her legs in the battle against Yuuto, but in the process she receives Impurity legs as replacements from Kamui (like Rokuro's arm), increasing her speed and ability to fight beside Rokuro. After the time skip, both seem to have become even closer, with Benio silently noting that she has fallen in love with him. When receiving Sayo's enchantment, Benio's guardian appears to be a dark entity that rivals the Basara Impurity and is revealed by Kuzunoha to be Ashiya Dōman, Abe no Seimei's archrival. She later loses her ability to exorcise and decides to stay while Rokuro leaves for Tsuchimikado Island ahead of her; before that, she confirms her love for him and kisses him for the first time. She later learns from Chinu, the first Impurity, that she has not actually lost her powers but is instead awakening her true powers—the powers of Yin—as Benio is not human but an Impurity in human form. Experiencing the oppression of past Lunas and noticing that a <Sol> was not beside them, Benio unlocks her Impurity transformation and rejoins Rokuro just in time for their rematch against Yuuto. After the second time skip, Benio gains an eyepatch similar to Yuuto's. Benio's secret is eventually exposed, and she is placed in custody. Rokuro helps her escape from custody and convinces the exorcist community to trust Benio again and accept their marriage. With Tsuchimikado Island overwhelmed by a Kegare pandemic, Benio is forced to give up her humanity to defeat the crisis; she then receives hatred from the civilians and leaves for Magano. In her futile attempt to stop Sakanashi's plot, she is overcome by negative emotions and seeks to escape her fate by destroying the mainland so that she and Rokuro can live together without the Twin Stars. A reformed embodiment of Yuuto helps Benio merge their souls to complete the true Yin transformation, siding with Rokuro to exorcise the King of Impurities. She and Rokuro experience many obstacles in King Kegare's dimension but never falter. They leave their son Hikaru behind to seal the Impurity. Ten years later, Hikaru tirelessly works to see his parents again and succeeds.
Hikaru Enmado (閻魔堂ヒカル)
The human–impurity hybrid 10-year-old son of Rokuro and Benio. He was born in Magano and baptized as the Miko. His parents conceived him with the help of Chinu, the midwife. Hikaru surpassed all distinguished prodigies from early childhood, as he already possessed self-awareness, though he feigned ignorance of his parents' fate under the guidance of his legal guardian, Mayura, for the following seven years. He speaks in an adult manner, and his academic talents as an exorcist are overwhelmingly high despite Mayura's objections. Despite not wanting their son to follow the Miko path, Hikaru secretly coordinates with a young Basara named Mirai to formulate a powerful spell to reincarnate his mother and father. When the plans are finalized, Hikaru announces them to the exorcist community, and they proceed with them. Arriving in the Outcast Valley, Hikaru and Mirai summon the Twelve Guardian familiars to rebirth King Kegare and transform it into King Purification, thereby separating Benio and Rokuro from its body. With the remaining Basara disappearing to their newfound planet, Hikaru and the surrounding people shower the Twin Stars with smiles.

=== Seika Dormitory ===
Ryougo Nagitsuji (椥辻 亮悟, Nagitsuji Ryōgo)
Voiced by: Tomoaki Maeno (Japanese); Todd Haberkorn (English)
Rokuro's friend and fellow exorcist who often acts as a surrogate older brother. During the first few chapters of the manga and the first few episodes of the anime, Ryougo continuously pesters Rokuro to become an exorcist again. He is engaged to fellow resident Haruka, whom he marries at the end of the anime.
Shinnosuke Kunizaki (国崎 慎之助, Kuzaki Shinnosuke)
Voiced by: Daiki Yamashita (Japanese); Brian Beacock (English)
An exorcist whose face is covered by his hair.
Atsushi Sukumozuka (額塚 篤, Sukumodzuka Atsushi)
Voiced by: Taishi Murata (Japanese); Max Mittelman (English)
An exorcist with a red streak in his hair.
Zenkichi Otomi (音海 善吉, Otomi Zenkichi)
Voiced by: Susumu Akagi (Japanese); Brian Beacock (English)
Mayura's grandfather and Yukari's father.
Kinu Furusato (生琉里 絹, Furusato Kinu)
Voiced by: Masako Isobe (Japanese); Alex Evette (English)
Benio's legal guardian.

=== Twelve Guardians ===
The Twelve Guardians, literally meaning "Heavenly Commanders", are a group of twelve elite exorcists stationed on Tsuchimikado Island, where Magano was first created, to prevent the Impurities from overrunning the mainland. Second only to Arima Tsuchimikado in power among the exorcists, each uses one of the twelve familiars of Abe no Seimei and inherits a portion of his power through that familiar. The twelve families from which they come are descended from the twelve original companions of Abe no Seimei. In the anime, they are not stationed on Tsuchimikado Island and usually perform missions across the country in pairs.

==== Current members ====
Mayura Otomi (音海 繭良, Otomi Mayura)
Voiced by: Yū Serizawa (Japanese); Laura Summer (English)
Rokuro's childhood friend and the daughter of one of the most powerful exorcists in the world. Mayura is described as having a large bust. She is forced by Yuuto to become a Fallen Impurity and then goes on a rampage before being cleansed by Rokuro and Benio. After recovering, Mayura dedicates herself to following Rokuro's path as an exorcist and asks Seigen to train her for the next two years. Initially lacking confidence, she acquires Seigen's charm, Byakko, and soon takes her father's place as head of the Amakawa House and as one of the Heavenly Commanders. She has feelings for Rokuro and initially feels envious of Benio's relationship with him and of her strength, but later becomes Benio's closest friend and decides to support their relationship instead. Mayura eventually develops a romantic interest in Shimon and forms a partnership with him. She takes responsibility for raising Hikaru, though she is annoyed by his mature manner of speaking, and remains single unless her two important friends return. In the video game, Mayura is one of the Twin Star candidates along with Benio and three other new characters.
Shimon Ikaruga (斑鳩 士門, Ikaruga Shimon)
Voiced by: Kaito Ishikawa (Japanese); Johnny Yong Bosch (English)
Considered a child prodigy, Shimon has attained the rank of Heavenly Commander, despite being only two years older than Rokuro, holding the title "Suzaku". Shimon is also Seigen's former student. He possesses the ability to fly and hates vehicles. His goal is to end the 1,000-year war and relieve Sayo of her heavy burden so that she can live a long and free life. While he initially looked down on Rokuro and company, after they saved Sayo from two Basaras, he came to see them in a new light and with newfound respect, stating that he looks forward to the day they will fight together. Shimon aims to surpass Tenma due to their childhood rivalry. When Tenma used a prohibited enchantment that severed Shimon's leg during the Exorcist Games, he believed that his days as an exorcist were over. He later received a prosthetic replacement and proved to Tenma that fate was not predetermined.
Subaru Mitejima (御幣島 すばる, Mitejima Subaru)
Voiced by: Miyuki Sawashiro (Japanese); Kate Higgins (English)
She is an exorcist who holds the title "Tenkō" and is Benio's former master. Subaru appears to be a young woman with long blonde hair who wears a white hat and a white dress. She is somewhat eccentric. Like Arima, she intends to improve the Twin Stars' marital relationship and arranges for them to spend time together. She unleashes talismans from her fan deck, which form into numerous weapons, including guns. In the manga, after a match with Mayura in the Exorcist Games, Subaru takes Mayura as her new apprentice. It is later revealed that Subaru is fond of Gaja, and their relationship eventually develops into a forbidden romance that leads to their demise in a battle in Magano. Their final scene together depicts them sharing a dream of starting a family.
Tatara (鈩)
Voiced by: Takuma Terashima (Japanese); Nicolas Roye (English)
Tatara appears to be a priest who wears a paper mask that reflects his mood. His title is Tōda (騰蛇 "Soaring Snake"). He is actually a 600-year-old Shikigami. He is known as the most chaotic of the Heavenly Commanders. In the manga, he acts as an enforcer, punishing exorcists who fight among themselves using enchantments outside of Magano. In the anime, he is regularly accompanied by Subaru and serves as a mentor to the Twin Stars. Tatara has a history with Kuranashi. For the most part, he remains silent unless provoked. In an attempt to prevent a potential Impurity epidemic, he wrongfully exterminates a quarantined patient, inadvertently triggering the event that leads to heavy losses on Tsuchimikado. Tatara is crushed by the King of Impurities. He is resurrected as a Shikigami infant in the anime.
Arata Inanaki (嗎 新, Inanaki Arata)
Voiced by: Kosuke Toriumi (Japanese); Nicolas Roye (English)
A self-confident Heavenly Commander. He stands with the title "Taijō". Not much is known of Arata's personality, other than his diverging habit of addressing a person's name by putting "-tan" at the end. He likes reading doujinshi. He is the acting principal of Seiyouin Exorcist Academy on Tsuchimikado Island. Aside from his teachings, Arata's position is to take readings and monitor the activities in Magano.
Kankurou Mitosaka (水度坂 勘九郎, Mitosaka Kankurou)
Voiced by: Yūichi Nakamura
He has blue eyes and is usually depicted with his mouth covered. He rarely displays his fighting style, but is presumed to be formidable enough to justify his title as a Heavenly Commander. He is an exorcist known as "Seiryū" (青龍 "Azure Dragon"). He is a supervising physician on Tsuchimikado Island. In his younger days, his duty was to help ill children recover fully. He experienced an unavoidable tragedy when he chose to save the island over the children who were taken hostage. After being defeated in the Exorcist Games, Kankurou is persuaded by Rokuro and Kengo to move on, and he fulfills his agreement to support Rokuro's House.
Kengo Uiji (雲林院 憲剛, Ujii Kengo)
Voiced by: Katsuyuki Konishi
He is an exorcist who is somewhat irritable and easily annoyed with his fellow Heavenly Commander, Kankuro, when they introduce themselves. He is known as "Genbu" (玄武 "Black Tortoise"). He is also depicted as having a miserly personality and is very greedy with money. He works as an instructor on Tsuchimikado Island for younger exorcists, and is childhood friends with Kankurou.
Shizuru Ioroi (五百蔵 志鶴, Ioroi Shizuru)
Narumi Ioroi's second daughter, who inherits the title of "Kōchin" after his death, Shizuru aims to become the strongest of all female exorcists. She has a tomboyish personality and initially disregards exorcists from the mainland, though her opinion changes after Rokuro saves her, and she subsequently develops a crush on him. She received a scar on her face that might have imbued her with Yin energy.
Cordelia Kasukami (勝神コーデリア, Kasukami Kōderia)
Voiced by: Kiyono Yasuno
Cordelia is an exorcist who is equipped with mechanical devices. Her suit title is "Tenkū". Most of the time, she shows no facial expression and speaks in a robotic voice by spelling out her words, which do not come from her mouth. Shozan, whom Cordelia (formerly known as Tsuyuko) looked up to like a big brother, implanted her mind into an artificial body for enchantment armor control as the lead representative of the Kasukami family.
Tenma Unomiya (鸕宮 天馬, Unomiya Tenma)
Voiced by: Hiro Shimono
He is labeled as the strongest among the Heavenly Commanders. He can slice his enemies with his sword and bring total annihilation to his surroundings without any use of talisman enhancements. His title is "Kijin," which is associated with the source of deceased female Twin Stars. In the manga, it is stated that his latent power is so high that he may not even know how to use talismans, as they are effectively useless to him. For generations, selected candidates of the Unomiya House are forced to kill one another in a remote ritual until the last survivor becomes the Heavenly Commander, the latest being Tenma, who endured the deaths of his brethren. An oracle and the death of his sister cursed the world around him, making Tenma incomprehensible. In the major battle against Yuuto, Tenma's heritage allows him and Rokuro to perform Resonance. Yuuto's sudden Unchain evolution takes them by surprise, and Tenma blocks the attack, allowing Rokuro to survive after losing several of his limbs. Using his last power to exorcise Sakanashi during the apocalyptic event, Tenma dies in peace and, in doing so, finally praises Shimon, ending their small feud.

==== Former Members ====
Seigen Amawaka (天若 清弦, Amawaka Seigen)
Voiced by: Junichi Suwabe (Japanese); Doug Erholtz (English)
Seigen is Mayura's divorced father and former master of Rokuro and Yuuto; he left his family because he did not wish for his duties to interfere with their lives. He has a cold exterior but is caring. Seigen renounces his status as a Heavenly Commander after losing his right arm to his traitorous student Yuuto. Despite the loss of his arm, he is not heavily impeded when fighting regular Kegare and still dominates Rokuro in sparring matches. When Mayura's skills are approved, Seigen passes the "Byakko" (White Tiger) title to her.
Narumi Ioroi (五百蔵 鳴海, Ioroi Narumi)
Voiced by: Masaya Takatsuka
He is a muscular exorcist who believes in strength that should not go unused. His title is "Kōchin". His earth-based abilities allow him to raise structures out of the environment to attack his enemies. He has a short-statured wife and nine children. Along with his schoolmates Arima, Arata, and Seigen, he led a squad of fifty against Chikura, the previous eighth, nurse-like Basara, which posed a centuries-old threat. He was mortally wounded in a battle against Gabura and passed his title to Shizuru before dying.
Miku Zeze (膳所 美玖, Zeze Miku)
Voiced by: Yui Ogura (Japanese); Amanda C. Miller (English)
Miku is an exorcist with long, curly pink hair. She is highly strict in her duties as a Heavenly Commander and carries out missions to cleanse all Kegare regardless of circumstances. Her title is "Daion". She is older than she looks; Tenma states she is 56 years old. Her enchantment is based on plush dolls. In the anime, she was paired with Sakura's father, for whom she had feelings, long before she was born. When she discovered that Sakura's father was to be married, she accepted the situation without complaint. In a battle in Magano, Miku used her last remaining strength to save Sakura and Ioroi's squad from a Basara.
Sakura Sada (蹉跎 桜, Sada Sakura)
Voiced by: Lynn (Japanese); Alex Cazares (English)
Sakura is an exorcist known as "Rikugō". She has long chestnut hair tied with a pink bow near the ends and wears a large white and green hat. In the anime, she is paired with fellow Heavenly Commander Miku. Her weapon of choice is a scythe. Like her father, she has a loud personality and often shouts when speaking to others. Sakura looks up to Miku as a surrogate mother. In the manga, Sakura receives a critical blow from Gabura during the invasion of Impurities, and both fall into an abyss despite their differences.

=== Antagonists ===
Yuuto Ijika (石鏡 悠斗, Ijika Yūto)
Voiced by: Ayumu Murase (Japanese); Vic Mignogna (English)
Yuuto is Benio's twin brother and an old friend of Rokuro who supposedly died two years ago at the Hiinatsuki Dormitory. Yuuto had been using the cadets as experimental subjects. Rokuro, the only successful subject, was forced to kill them, an event known as the "Hiinatsuki Tragedy" that inflicted such trauma on him that he decided to quit exorcism until he met Benio. Yuuto's objective is to become the ultimate exorcist by attaining the complete power of yang (the spiritual powers of humanity) and yin (the spiritual powers of the Kegare), which would result in eradicating all life. Upon learning of his plans, Rokuro and Benio focus on their training to defeat him. Rokuro seeks to avenge his dead friends, while Benio intends to defeat her brother as a form of atonement for her family's honor. His entire body came into direct contact with a Fallen Impurity, transforming him into one during his battle with Rokuro and Benio. In the anime, Yuuto was born with what is described as an unnecessary existence and acts as a guide for Rokuro so that one of them can become the King of Impurities. He sees Benio as inferior and as an obstacle to his purpose because of her engagement with Rokuro. In the manga, Yuuto aspired to protect his family in his youth until an accident left him in a coma for half a year. As a sibling of a Twin Star, Yuuto experienced visions of a catastrophe prophecy involving exorcists and humanity, which left him mentally unstable and burdened by guilt. As he lay dying, Yuuto could be heard singing a song from his childhood.

=== Basara ===
The Basara are the most powerful Impurities in existence, each gaining intelligence, speech, and a human-like body by absorbing the energy of the exorcists they killed. Like exorcists, they can use their own versions of enchanted gear and talismans to strengthen their powers. Unlike regular Impurities, their bodies do not disappear once they are killed. Originally, there were 11 active Basara. Some of them did not appear in the anime series and were replaced by original characters created for the anime.

Chinu (千怒)
The first and oldest of the eleven Basara. She is labeled as the "most powerful", though she has relatively low enchantments and bears a striking resemblance to Abe no Seimei. Chinu is actually a prototype Impurity that was extensively experimented on in Ashiya Dōman's research as a countermeasure to the King of Impurities. Unlike other Basara, she takes a keen interest in human society. Upon meeting Benio in person, as with many previous female Twin Stars, Chinu offered to awaken her dormant powers at the cost of her humanity. In the past, Chinu and Sakanashi fought each other for seven decades, eventually becoming estranged lovers. He could not comprehend Chinu's intentions in cultivating Magano and building a village for coexistence, no matter how hopeless it seemed. After the first sighting of King Kegare, Chinu instructs the Twin Stars to deliver the Miko within a time-limited area (539 days inside equals 77 days outside) and to use an alternative method to exorcise the Kegare's second coming in order to avoid further casualties. By using her life force power to maintain the time barrier, her body rapidly aged, and turned to dust, and she died in peace.
Sakanashi (無悪)
The second and de facto leader of the eleven Basara, his role in the manga is the same as Kuranashi in the anime. Unlike Chinu, Sakanashi has no qualms about killing humans or impurities for power. Not only does his "Pitch Black Puppet" enchantment allow him to engulf the boundaries of physics, Sakanashi's final white form, called "Unchain", can effortlessly match a Head Exorcist. He misled the Basara into cooperating with him. By the end of the exorcist games, Sakanashi implements his diabolic plan to keep the Heavenly Commanders at bay, luring Arima onto the battlefield to kill him otherwise, and releasing a herd of Impurities through the gateway and into Tsuchimikado Island to lead humanity to oblivion. He is destroyed by a suicide attack from Arima. His death led the Yang embodiment that he had confined a millennium ago to be set free and seek out its vessel, Rokuro, to devour it and forcibly trigger its awakening. Five years later, Sakanashi resurrects in child form and resumes his plan to spur Benio into following the path of <Luna> imbued with twisted idealism. Thought to be slain by Tenma, he unleashes the King of Impurities, which until then was restrained by a pure firewall of sanity generated by Sakanashi's yin energy and Abe no Seimei's yang energy.
Gabura (加布羅)
He is the third of the eleven Basara. In the manga, his risk level is SS and he is responsible for the death of Tsubaki Sada, Sakura's father. He slightly resembles Tsubaki, with similar hairstyles. Gabura treats killing humans as a sport. He uses instant shock wave enchantments, similar to Rokuro's "Gold Smash," shown when he targets the Ioroi squad. According to Lost History, Gabura was the first subject of the Fallen Impurity experiment, originally a young boy named Ariyuki from the Tsuchimikado Branch House. His family reportedly wanted him dead after the experiment failed. Sakura and Miku arrive with reinforcements to focus all fire on Gabura for the long-awaited battle. However, Gabura proved to be too strong, so Sakura and Shizuru opened a portal to transport him to a distant location, while a dying Miku used her last remaining energy to push Gabura into it. In the next battle with Sakura, Gabura's memories of sorrow resurface when he witnesses a child's pain, and Sakura also experiences this, developing a small degree of empathy toward Gabura as they fall to their deaths together. Having survived the fall, Gabura lost his fighting spirit until a frustrated Shizuru pushed him to finish the fight. Shizuru kills Gabura, and in his final moments, he awaits her in the underworld.
Hijirimaru (聖丸)
He is the fourth of the eleven Basara. Hijirimaru enjoys toying with humans and has no pity for them. He kills his opponents to awaken the rage and hatred of their loved ones, in order to gain more power. He and Higano kidnap Sayo and take her into Magano in order to feed on her spiritual power, but are stopped by Shimon, Rokuro, Benio, and Mayura. After absorbing Higano's enchanted powers to become stronger, Hijirimaru is destroyed by the Twin Star Exorcists' combined power. He is revealed to be motivated by a desire to obtain enough power to allow Higano and himself to watch the sky on Earth without the risk of being turned to dust by Earth's yang energy.
Shiromi (銀鏡)
He is the fifth of the eleven Basara. He wears a magician's outfit and hat. He summons impurities the size of fortresses to ambush Rokuro's squad in an attempt to avenge Hijirimaru, his former partner. Shiromi retaliates by taking hostages close to Rokuro. Rokuro escapes from an Impurity attempting to devour him, and his squad sets up a distraction to surprise Shiromi, while Rokuro strikes him. Despite this, a still-standing Shiromi impales Rokuro and his team, which causes recurring visions of his peers from the Hinatsuki Dormitory in his mind. Before Rokuro can muster a sudden power to fight back, Arima appears and saves the team. Shiromi then dies realizing Sakanashi may have been using him.
Kaguya (赫夜)
She is the sixth of the eleven Basara. Kaguya is a foul-mouthed and mentally unstable Impurity. She wears a lieutenant uniform, uses a whip, and is obsessive about her "darling," a male exorcist-turned-zombie. Her enchantments are based on water elements, which she can transform into a full-body liquid form. The source of her hatred for humans and Impurity comes from her past relationship with a human lover, in which she once believed in the possibility of love, until she was betrayed and discriminated against. Kaguya rages further upon learning that Benio, who is now an Impurity, could be allowed to see a human (Rokuro) and witness her darling's corpse being destroyed. In retaliation, Kaguya alters her body into a water-based form in an attempt to drown Kamui and Benio, but she fails, and her body vaporizes, leading to her death.
Gaja (臥蛇)
He is the seventh of the eleven Basara. He has a scarred left eye and controls yang energy to create magnetic fields. In his youth, Gaja was among many experimental subjects held by the Mitejima Household until his escape. Subaru seemingly sympathizes with Gaja. When Gaja encounters Subaru again when she is alone in Magano, he soon becomes enamored with her out of self-pity. Despite being a formidable foe, he has no real fighting spirit.
Shioji (四皇子)
He is the eighth of the eleven Basara. Shioji wears a girlish, custom-made private school uniform and narrates his speech. He specializes in reanimating former exorcists and forcing them to fight their former comrades. The realization of Sakanashi's delusion does not sway Shioji's strategy, and he continues to exterminate as many exorcists as he can. Tatara then ambushes Shioji and impales him in the chest. With his final thoughts, he wishes for rebirth, but not as a mere Impurity.
Higano (氷鉋)
He is the ninth of the eleven Basara. He has followed Hijimaru since he first found him as an ordinary juvenile Impurity. Unlike his partner, he is calm and collected and is not interested in obtaining additional enchanted powers for himself. However, Higano is highly dedicated to Hijimaru and his dream, to the point of sacrificing himself to take a fatal attack for him and transfers his enchanted powers to Hijimaru to make him stronger.
Yuzuriha (杠)
She is the tenth of the eleven Basara. She wears a bunny outfit and has strong sensory abilities for detecting spiritual power. As a masochist, Yuzuriha has no qualms about posing as bait to advance Sakanashi's plan to direct Impurities into the real world. She is seen carrying Sakanashi's disfigured head after his defeat by Arima. Yuzuriha claims that she has no resentment over having no free will and that she simply wants to be useful to Sakanashi. She sacrifices her life, giving Sakanashi the chance to escape his battle with Tenma, Shimon, and Mayura and continue his plan. Arima condemns her goal as a curse, not a dream. Her body is destroyed by a shockwave, leaving only her head, as Sakanashi tells her to rest in peace.
Kamui (神威)
Voiced by: Yūki Ono (Japanese); Benjamin Diskin (English)
He is the youngest and eleventh of the eleven Basara. He is also responsible for the death of Benio's parents. However, he allows his opponents to choose their preferred manner of death and gives them ten seconds to decide. He seeks entertainment by fighting humans, without regard for which side (human or Impurity) is destroyed, and admires humans for being weak yet striving to grow stronger. Despite knowing of Benio's hatred toward him, he often appears to help her, hoping to fight her once she becomes a worthy opponent. Kamui appears to be on good terms with Chinu. Throughout the series, Kamui's interest in Benio grows until he comes to care for her unconditionally, without fully realizing it. When Kaguya severely wounds him, Kamui questions whether he should die for his crimes, but Benio encourages him not to sacrifice his life unnecessarily. He awakens his ultimate white form (Unchain) to protect Benio from Kaguya. He waits for the day to fight the Twin Stars and is implied to have ended his killing of humans due to Benio's influence.

=== Other characters ===
Arima Tsuchimikado (土御門 有馬, Tsuchimikado Arima)
Voiced by: Daisuke Namikawa (Japanese); Matthew Mercer (English)
He is the leader of all exorcists in Japan who arranges the marriage between Benio and Rokuro. He later relocates them to a villa. While eccentric and comedic, he also has an enigmatic, devious, and sinister side. His most powerful enchantment is summoning Avalokiteśvara. He is also powerful enough that two of the Heavenly Commanders declined to join him on the battlefield, as they would be a hindrance. He sometimes appears uncaring toward the Twin Stars when they are in danger, although he actually wants them to prove themselves worthy of their title and strengthen their powers and bond, unlike the previous Twin Star couples who died due to their carelessness. In the manga, during his battle against Sakanashi, Arima uses his Fallen Impurity transformation as a last resort, sacrificing himself to defeat the Basara.
Kinako (きなこ)
Voiced by: Jun Fukuyama (Japanese); Joey Lotsko (English)
Benio's familiar who is very protective of her. He can possess vehicles and machines to assist the Twin Stars in their missions. While he appears in the anime series from the beginning, Kinako only appears in the manga when Rokuro takes ownership of Benio's house, which was abandoned after her clan was disbanded following her parents' deaths and Yuuto's betrayal, and has been guarded by him since then.
Yukari Otomi (音海 紫, Otomi Yukari)
Mayura's mother and the ex-wife of Seigen Amawaka. She is a biologist on the mainland.
Sayo Ikaruga (斑鳩 小夜, Ikaruga Sayo)
She is Shimon's younger cousin addressed as his little sister. He nicknames her "Chiiko". Despite being 11 years old, she is the heiress and proctor of the Ikaruga House. Sayo is the host of the guardian Kuzunoha, which allows her to perform a ceremony of divination on exorcists to assess their spiritual essence. However, harboring such a strong guardian spirit greatly shortens her lifespan to less than two decades. Spending her entire life on the closed-off island, she gains the opportunity to visit the mainland upon Rokuro's request to be tested and determine whether he will be chosen as worthy, making Sayo fall for him and consider him her prince. She becomes openly affectionate toward him whenever she is near him, which causes Benio to become envious of Sayo. Four years later, Sayo trained to harness Kuzunoha's powers and participate in exorcising impurities. Once learning of Rokuro's proposal to Benio, she hastily challenges Benio on a mission in Magano in doing so to get approval. As Sayo lies on her hospital bed, she senses the returning presence of the Twin Stars and rejoices.
Arimori Tsuchimikado (土御門 有主, Tsuchimikado Arimori)
The unreliable son of Arima. He only makes his debut, when Rokuro enrolls at Seiyouin Exorcist Academy on Tsuchimikado Island. Arimori is initially acknowledged by all lower clansmen until he decides to withdraw from living in the Enmado's house after Rokuro takes over its property as a branch member. Prideful of his desire for his father's loyalty, Arimori swore his allegiance to Rokuro instead. Arimori tricked several young exorcists into signing for Enmado House, who thought it would be the Tsuchimikado House, regardless of the deception the members serve affiliation and companionship to Rokuro and Arimori. He and Kinako cheered for Rokuro's victory in the Exorcist Games. In the battle between Sakanashi and Arima, Arimori finally earns his father's acceptance. Following Arima's death, Arimori is brought back to the Tsuchimikado House as the next Head Exorcist-in-training. Arimori allies with the rebel Basara to secure the barrier in-between Magano and the real world. On the verge of giving up, Arimori receives the blessing of <Unchain> from Tatara's will, standing on the same level as his father.
Sae (さえ)
Voiced by: Hitomi Sasaki (Japanese); Tara Sands (English)
She is a young girl appearing in the anime only. She is intelligent and very enthusiastic toward Rokuro and Benio. Like Rokuro, Sae is found in Magano with no memory of her past. Rokuro and the others bring her to the Seika Dormitory. She travels with the Twin Stars to exterminate the Dragon Spot outbreak. It is proven that Sae possesses strong abilities, including the ability to deflect Basara attacks. Eventually, it is revealed that Sae came from a branch of the Ame-no-mihashira, a gigantic tree barrier that separates Magano and the real world, and attained human form as a tsukumogami, upsetting the balance between both realms. The balance is restored when she returns to her former form, much to Rokuro and Benio's grief. She refers to Rokuro as "Papa", possibly due to his connection with Abe no Seimei.
Mikage Tsuchimikado (土御門 御影, Tsuchimikado Mikage)
Voiced by: Daisuke Ono
He is an anime-only member of the Tsuchimikado family. He serves Arima as his right-hand man, and after Arima's disappearance, he serves as the stand-in for Head Exorcist. Unlike Arima, he is mostly silent and speaks only when necessary. It is later revealed that Mikage is actually Abe no Seimei's Shikigami, created to oversee his plan to rid the world of Impurities.
Suzu (珠洲)
Voiced by: Yuki Wakai (Japanese); Erica Lindbeck (English)
She is a Basara with a colorful personality and hobby for metal rock and role-playing. Suzu is an unusual Basara who was created without absorbing spiritual energy from other exorcists. She prefers to fight her opponents in battle-dancing performances, although she despises those who are cowardly. Her music affects low-spiritual users, causing them to mutate. She takes an interest in Rokuro, as he is the first human she has met. She first appeared as an anime-original character, but later appears in the manga of chapter 76. She joins the Basara–Exorcist alliance with Kamui and Rokuro to rescue Benio from her demonic manifestation.

==== Anime Original ====
Kuranashi (闇無)
Voiced by: Kazuhiko Inoue (Japanese); Greg Chun (English)
A mysterious and powerful Basara, he is always seen wearing a mask, which seems to hold a portion of his power. He is the main perpetrator who tampered with the Ame-no-mihashira to access the Dragon Spots across the country, pretending it's a game in order to lure the Heavenly Commanders into a trap to extract their spiritual energy for greater power. Having lived for hundreds of years as a Basara, Kuranashi has evolved to display almost human-like features. His consciousness is overtaken by Yuuto when he attempts to absorb Yuuto's body, revealing that Kuranashi was merely a pawn, as Yuuto had been waiting for him to do so in order to take his stolen powers.
Moro (師)
Voiced by: Sayaka Ohara (Japanese); Abby Trott (English)
She is a Basara and Kuranashi's loyal servant. Moro can generate enchantments in her muscles through her armor. She is responsible for the death of Sakura's father twenty years earlier, and is later defeated by Sakura and Miku.
Yamato (山門)
He is a Basara who declares superiority. He adores large Kegare that are useful in combat. He is later defeated by Kankuro and Kengo.
Kinasa (鬼無里)
Voiced by: Shouma Yamamoto
He is a powerful, butler-like Basara whom the Twin Stars are initially unable to defeat. He attacks them with a musket until Tenma intervenes and singlehandedly cuts him in half. He appears in the manga and holds a high position among the inhabitants of the Basara village.
Chijiwa (千々石) and Momochi (百道)
Voiced by: Yoshitsugu Matsuoka (Japanese); Robbie Daymond (English)
They are the only Basara twins. Chijiwa wears a black suit, while Momochi wears a white suit. Following Momochi's defeat, Chijiwa swears revenge against the Twin Stars, unaware that Kuranashi forced Momochi to commit seppuku for being deemed useless and transferred his brother's spiritual energy to Chijiwa, but is later defeated by Shimon and Rokuro.
Leon (レオン)
Voiced by: Haruo Satō (Japanese); Aaron LaPlante (English)
He is a lion-faced True Serpent (a Kegare on the verge of becoming a Basara) who came from Magano to the human world through a Dragon Spot to see something beautiful. He became friends with Sae but was later killed by Sakura and Miku.

=== Video game-only characters ===
Ran Ikuno
Voiced by: Nozomi Yamamoto
The youngest of the Twin Star candidates in the game, she is an innocent, airheaded "little sister" type character with no real desire to become an exorcist.
Rimu Tennōji
Voiced by: Kana Hanazawa
Another of the Twin Star candidates in the game, she is a tomboy who has lost part of her memory.
Ai Katsujō
Voiced by: Ami Koshimizu
The third of the original Twin Star candidates in the game, she is a composed and seductive "older sister" type who has extensive combat experience and has a good relationship with Arima.
