= Masakazu Natsuda =

Japanese composer

Masakazu Natsuda (夏田 昌和 Natsuda Masakazu, born 2 July 1968 in Tokyo) is a Japanese composer, former student of Gérard Grisey at the Conservatoire de Paris.

== Career ==
Natsuda studied musical composition with Jō Kondō, Masayuki Nagatomi and Teruyuki Noda at the Tokyo University of the Arts and Music (東京藝術大学 Tōkyō Gei-jutsu Daigaku), where he obtained his Bachelor of Music in 1991 and his Master of Music in 1993. He also studied orchestral conducting with Kazuyoshi Akiyama at the Senzoku Gakuen College of Music in Yokohama. From 1993 to 1997, he studied composition with Gérard Grisey and orchestral conducting with Jean-Sébastien Bereau and the Conservatoire de Paris, where he earned first prizes with praise.

In 1992 he made his debut as a conductor with his composition Morphogenesis in a performance with the New Symphony Orchestra in Tokyo. Since 1998 he is conductor of the contemporary ensemble Alpha and since 2001 of the "Ensemble Vivo" with which he mainly performs contemporary works such as Voltex Temporum I-III by his former teacher Gérard Grisey and The Desert Music by Steve Reich.

== Works ==
=== Orchestral music ===
- Soliton - for chamber orchestra (1995)
- Megalithic Waves - for chamber orchestra (1997)
- Astration - in memoriam Gérard Grisey - for orchestra (2001)
- Tableau avec Ré, Fa, La - (2002) – for chamber orchestra
- Cross-Light - for chamber orchestra (2003)
- Les ondes gravitationnelles - for orchestra (2004)
- Danse de la Mante Religieuse - for orchestra (2011)

=== Concertos ===
- Morphogenesis - for oboe and orchestra (1991)
- The String of Life - for violin and orchestra (1993)

=== Chamber music ===
- Rapprochement - for flute, oboe, 2 violins, 2 violas and piano (1991)
- Divergence - for flute, clarinet, violin, cello and piano (1994)
- Trois Dessins - for trombone, harp, violin, viola, cello and percussion (1995)
- Motet de l'aube, hommage to Guillaume de Machaut - for bass clarinet, contrabassoon, three violins and percussion (1998)
- Galop - (1996), for flute, clarinet, violin and piano (1999)
- Falling - for flute, clarinet, violin, viola, cello and piano (2002)
- Music for keyboard instruments - two pianos and six percussionists (2006)
- Layered Song from Long Ago - for 2 clarinets, viola, cello and vibraphone (2008)
- Lonc tans me sui tenu de chanter, mes... (長いこと私は歌わずにやってきた、しかし...) for alto flute and viola (2008)
- 2 Pièces (2つの小品) for horn and viola (2008)
- Convergence - thirteen instrumentistes (2010)
- Octet - for wind and percussion instruments (2011)
- Quatre Prismes dans l'Espace for 12 trumpeters and three percussionists (1991)
- Sous un ciel étoile, près de l'eau - for two violins, piano, two percussionists (1992)
- West, or Evening Song in Autumn - for soprano saxophone and percussion (1996)
- Gameraphony - (1998)
- Scherzo pour Trio Trichronochrome - for French horn, violin and piano (1999)
- Rencontre - for flute, violin and percussion (2000)
- Equatorial Song - for flute, prepared piano (2000)

=== Instrumental only ===
- Parcours entre vitraux et absidioles for organ (1993)
- Electro-Spiral, L'échelle de la vie - for electronic organ (1993)
- Flux et Reflux - for piano (1994)
- Flots, Dan-no-ura » - for piano (1997)
- Les chants préhistoriques I - for violon (1999)
- Les chants préhistoriques II - for violon (2000)
- Stumbling Drums in Savanna for percussion (2001)
- Gamelaphony II - for piano (2009)
