= Twin Star Exorcists =

Japanese manga series and its franchise

- First tankōbon volume cover, featuring Rokuro Enmado (left) and Benio Adashino (right)

双星の陰陽師 (Sōsei no Onmyōji)
- Genre: Adventure; Romance; Supernatural
- Manga
- Written by: Yoshiaki Sukeno
- Published by: Shueisha
- English publisher: NA: Viz Media
- Imprint: Jump Comics SQ.
- Magazine: Jump Square
- Original run: November 2, 2013 – September 4, 2024
- Volumes: 35
- Anime television series
- Directed by: Tomohisa Taguchi
- Produced by: Makoto Hijikata; Maiko Isogai; Tomohiko Iwase; Naoto Tani; Teruaki Sanematsu
- Written by: Naruhisa Arakawa
- Music by: Mikio Endō
- Studio: Pierrot
- Licensed by: Crunchyroll
- Original network: TXN (TV Tokyo)
- English network: SEA: Animax Asia
- Original run: April 6, 2016 – March 29, 2017
- Episodes: 50
Further information
Light novel
Written by	Hajime Tanaka
Illustrated by	Yoshiaki Sukeno
Published by	Shueisha
Imprint	Jump J-Books
Original run	August 4, 2016 – December 4, 2018
Volumes	3
Video game
Developer	Bandai Namco Entertainment
Publisher	Bandai Namco Entertainment
Genre	Adventure
Platform	PS Vita
Released	JP: January 26, 2017
Manga
Sōusei no Onmyōji: SD Nyoritsuryō!!
Written by	Koppy
Illustrated by	Yoshiaki Sukeno
Published by	Shueisha
Magazine	Saikyō Jump
Published	March 3, 2017
Volumes	1
Manga
Sōsei no Onmyōji: Tenen Jakko: Nishoku Kokkeiga
Written by	Hajime Tanaka
Illustrated by	Yoshiaki Sukeno
Published by	Shueisha
Magazine	Shonen Jump+
Original run	September 3, 2018 – November 26, 2018
Volumes	1
- icon

Twin Star Exorcists (Japanese: 双星の陰陽師, Hepburn: Sōsei no Onmyōji) is a Japanese manga series written and illustrated by Yoshiaki Sukeno. The manga was serialized in Shueisha's shōnen manga magazine Jump Square from November 2013 to September 2024, with its chapters collected in 35 tankōbon volumes. The story revolves around Rokuro Enmado and Benio Adashino, a pair of young and talented exorcists, who (according to a prophecy) are destined to marry and have a child that will be the ultimate exorcist. The manga series has been licensed for an English language release in North America by Viz Media, publishing the first volume in July 2015.

The series was adapted into an anime television series by Studio Pierrot, that ran from April 2016 to March 2017. Three light novels and two spin-off manga series have also been published. A video game was developed and published by Bandai Namco Entertainment for the PS Vita and released in January 2017.

== Plot ==
Rokuro Enmado is a young boy who used to be a powerful aspiring exorcist, before a tragic incident left his friends dead and made him abandon the profession. One day, he has a fateful encounter with Benio Adashino, a girl around his age and a well known exorcist from the east. According to a prophecy, Rokuro and Benio are the "Twin Star Exorcists" and are destined to marry and have a child known as the "Miko" which will be the ultimate exorcist, capable of cleansing all evil spirits (Kegare) from the world and ending the war that has lasted over a millennium.

== Media ==
=== Manga ===
Written and illustrated by Yoshiaki Sukeno, Twin Star Exorcists started in Shueisha's Jump Square magazine on November 2, 2013. A special chapter was published in Weekly Shōnen Jump in April 2016. The series finished after nearly eleven years on September 4, 2024. Shueisha collected its chapters in 35 tankōbon volumes, released from February 4, 2014, to November 1, 2024.

Viz Media licensed the series for publication in North America, with the first volume released on July 7, 2015.

==== Spin-offs ====
The first spin-off manga series, Sōsei no Onmyōji: SD Nyoritsuryō!! (双星の陰陽師 SD如律令!!) is a comedy spin-off comic, written by Koppy and supervised by Yoshiaki Sukeno. It is published at the official website of the original manga, as well as the magazine Saikyō Jump. The compiled volume was published on March 3, 2017.

The second spin-off manga series, Sōsei no Onmyōji: Tenen Jakko: Nishoku Kokkeiga (双星の陰陽師 天縁若虎〜二色滑稽画) is a manga adaptation of the light novel Sōsei no Onmyōji: Tenen Jakko, written and illustrated by the same authors. The back-story focuses on the characters, Seigen Amawaka and Yukari Otomi. The spin-off series was published on Shueisha's Shonen Jump+; it was preceded by a prologue chapter on August 27, 2018, while the series was published from September 3 to November 26, 2018. The compiled volume was published on December 4 of that same year.

=== Light novels ===
Three light novel adaptations have been published and released by Shueisha under its Jump J-Books imprint from August 4, 2016, to December 4, 2018. The light novels are Sōsei no Onmyōji: Tenen Jakko (双星の陰陽師 ―天縁若虎), Sōsei no Onmyōji: Shiga Kenbyaku (双星の陰陽師 ―士牙繭闢) and Sōsei no Onmyōji: Santen Haja (双星の陰陽師 ―三天破邪). Each novel features a back-story from the perspective of different characters from the main series, serving as prologues to the main story. They were written by Hajime Tanaka and supervised by Sukeno.

=== Anime ===
An anime television adaptation was announced in December 2015. The series is directed by Tomohisa Taguchi and written by Naruhisa Arakawa, with animation by Studio Pierrot. Shishō Igarashi served as assistant director, with character designs by Kikuko Sadakata, and Itsuko Takeda serving as chief animation director. The series was broadcast for 50 episodes on TV Tokyo and other TX Network stations from April 6, 2016, to March 29, 2017. The series' first opening theme song is "Valkyrie -Ikusa Otome-" (Valkyrie -戦乙女-; lit. "Valkyrie -War Maiden-") by Wagakki Band, while the first ending theme is "Eyes" (アイズ, Aizu) by Hitomi Kaji. The second opening theme, "Re:Call", is performed by the idol group i☆Ris, while the second ending theme, "Yadori-boshi" (宿り星) is performed by the two-man group Itowokashi (Kashitarō Itō and Ryō Miyada). The third opening theme, "sync" is performed by lol, while the third ending theme "Hide & Seek" is performed by Girlfriend. The fourth opening theme, "Kanadeai" is performed by Itowokoashi, while the fourth ending theme "Hotarubi" is performed by Wagakki Band.

Crunchyroll simulcast the series worldwide outside of Asia. The home video distribution was handled by Funimation in North America. Part 1 (episodes 1–13) were released on July 24, 2018, with a collector's box to store the later three parts; Part 2 (episodes 14–26) was released on September 18 of that same year; Part 3 (episodes 27–40) was released on November 13 of that same year; and Part 4 (episodes 41–50) was released on January 8, 2019. Anime Limited distributed the series in the United Kingdom.

In Southeast Asia, Animax Asia broadcast the series with English subtitles.

=== Video game ===
A video game adaptation of the series from Bandai Namco Entertainment was announced on September 3, 2016. The battle adventure game was released for PlayStation Vita, and features Rokuro as a playable character. It features an alternate setup with five different girls as candidates for the title of Twin Star, including Benio, Mayura, and three other characters designed exclusively for the game by original creator Yoshiaki Sukeno. The game was released to Japan on January 26, 2017.

== Reception ==
Volume 1 reached 11th place on the weekly Oricon manga charts, with 29,527 copies sold; volume 2 reached 23rd place, with 30,734 copies; volume 3 reached 46th place, with 38,835 copies; volume 4 reached 24th place, with 37,900 copies; volume 5 also reached 24th place, with 47,489 copies; volume 6 reached 32nd place, with 48,029 copies; volume 7 reached 20th place, with 48,762 copies; and volume 8 reached 11th place, with 56,947 copies.

Volume 3 of the English translation appeared on the New York Times Manga Best Sellers list for two non-consecutive weeks, first at eighth place and then at sixth.

== See also ==
- Good Luck Girl!, another manga series by the same author
