= Witch Watch =

Japanese manga series by Kenta Shinohara

- First tankōbon volume cover, featuring Nico Wakatsuki

ウィッチウォッチ (Witchi Wotchi)
- Genre: Fantasy; Romantic comedy
- Manga
- Written by: Kenta Shinohara
- Published by: Shueisha
- English publisher: NA: Viz Media
- Imprint: Jump Comics
- Magazine: Weekly Shōnen Jump
- Original run: February 8, 2021 – November 16, 2026
- Volumes: 28
- Anime television series
- Directed by: Hiroshi Ikehata
- Produced by: Hiroyuki Aoi; Yoshiteru Maeda; Ryota Kanda; Yurie Uehara; Yuki Ogasawara; Yūsuke Fujisawa; Yūnosuke Uno
- Written by: Deko Akao
- Music by: Yukari Hashimoto
- Studio: Bibury Animation Studios; Studio Massket (S2)
- Licensed by: Crunchyroll (streaming); Netflix (streaming); NA: GKIDS; SEA: Tropics Entertainment; US: Hulu (streaming)
- Original network: JNN (MBS, TBS), BS NTV, AT-X
- English network: SEA: Animax Asia
- Original run: April 6, 2025 – present
- Episodes: 25
- icon

Witch Watch (Japanese: ウィッチウォッチ, Hepburn: Witchi Wotchi; stylized in all caps) is a Japanese manga series written and illustrated by Kenta Shinohara. It was serialized in Shueisha's shōnen manga magazine Weekly Shōnen Jump from February 2021 to November 2026, with its chapters collected in 28 tankōbon volumes as of October 2026. An anime television series adaptation produced by Bibury Animation Studios aired from April to October 2025. A second season co-produced by Studio Massket is set to premiere in 2027.

By October 2025, the manga had over 4 million copies in circulation.

== Synopsis ==
The series focuses on Nico Wakatsuki, a teenage witch who, after completing her magical training, moves into a house with her childhood friend Morihito Otogi, a human-looking ogre. Due to their families' ancestral history, Morihito is to become Nico's familiar and protect her. Nico also hopes this will help them become a couple, as he is her longtime crush, though he does not reciprocate in the slightest. As the story progresses, Nico and Morihito find themselves forced to deal with the various supernatural and legendary beings they encounter while also trying to solve all the unpredictable problems Nico's magic causes in their daily lives.

== Characters ==
=== Otogi Household ===
Nico Wakatsuki (若月 ニコ, Wakatsuki Niko)
Voiced by: Rina Kawaguchi (Japanese); Lily Ki (English)
A first year high school student who is the "Witch of Thousand" (千の魔女, Sen no Majo), a witch who appears once every thousand years and possesses great magical powers, which lets her spells various magic. She often tries to help people with her magic, but usually does so without fully knowing the details or side effect of the spells. She is in love with her childhood friend Morihito Otogi, whom she affectionately calls "Moi" since as a child she was unable to correctly pronounce his name. She also struggles to reveal her feelings for him, despite it being obvious to pretty much every other character besides Morihito himself. Her mother Ibuki is the "Witch of Premonition" (予言の魔女, Yogen no Majo) and has foreseen that a disaster will befall upon Nico. To prevent this from happening, Ibuki lets Nico live with Morihito in the Otogi household and gathers other familiars to protect her.
Morihito Otogi (乙木 守仁, Otogi Morihito) / Moi (モイちゃん, Moi-chan)
Voiced by: Ryōta Suzuki, Natsumi Fujiwara (young), Asami Seto (Hitomi Mori) (Japanese); Stephen Fu, Heather Gonzalez (young), Laura Post (Hitomi Mori) (English)
An ogre with extreme physical strength due to practicing Ogre Qigong. His family is a familiar to Nico's family, who is also his childhood friend. He is very overprotective towards Nico but at the same seems to not reciprocate her feelings. While Morihito is a serious and responsible person, he can be eccentric in his interests and hobbies, such as being very fond of denims and other heavily detailed trivia items. He often acts like the mother in the household, doing the most chores as well as nagging and scolding the residents for the sake of their own. It is later revealed in a note that Nico gave him in the past that she "will always be Morihito's friend", which works as an unintentional curse that makes Morihito only see Nico as a friend, thus making him unable to realize that he is also in love with her.
Kanshi Kazamatsuri (風祭 監志, Kazamatsuri Kanshi)
Voiced by: Kōhei Amasaki, Yui Tsukada (young), Naomi Ōzora (Kanna) (Japanese); Caleb Yen, Kimberley Anne Campbell (Kanna) (English)
A tengu who can control wind, he befriended Nico during her training. He is Nico's "crow familiar", and moves in with her and Morihito as he is also tasked with protecting her. Kanshi speaks in Kansai dialect and often acts as the straight man in the household. He is very socially active, but also is bad with money management and incredibly impulsive, which causes him to end up in humiliating situations when he tries to use magic to make easy money. Due to tengu and ogre's clashing nature, he was hostile towards Morihiro when they first met, even tried to fight the latter for Nico's attention. Kanshi eventually came to fully accept him and even tries to help them to become a couple from time to time.
Keigo Magami (真神 圭護, Magami Keigo)
Voiced by: Kaito Ishikawa, Aya Yamane (young), Aoi Yūki (Keiko) (Japanese); Kevin K. Gomez, Anjali Kunapaneni (Keiko) (English)
A werewolf who transforms into another person, referred to as "Wolf" (ウルフ, Urufu), when he sees anything that he recognizes as a crescent. Keigo is usually a quiet person, but becomes arrogant when showing off his knowledge of obscure culture. He is also a minor YouTuber whose video sometimes turned out viral. Wolf, however, is always arrogant and rude. Nevertheless, both are loyal to their friends. Keigo is a classmate of Nico and Morihito; he schemed on getting closer to them as part of his contract with a warlock. As a child, he was trained as a professional figure skater, but quit after his mother suffered an injury that left her bound to a wheelchair. After Nico cured his mom, Keigo decides to move in to protect Nico. Nico later gave him a ring infused with floating magic, which he ultimately mastered thanks to his skating ability. Eventually, he starts to develop feelings for Nemu, although he himself does not realize this.
Miharu Kiryu (霧生 見晴, Kiryū Miharu)
Voiced by: Yuki Wakai, Manaka Iwami (Miharun) (Japanese); Anne Yatco, Lisa Reimold (Miharun) (English)
A cute young man who comes from family of exorcists. He is also a vampire; instead of human blood he feeds by absorbing people's life force or witch's magic power. Miharu is a third-year middle school student who is skilled with sword, which he hides in the parasol he always wears around. Although appearing polite and graceful, he has no filter and will say whatever is on his mind. Miharu moves in to the Otogi household to protect Nico and started to feeds himself with Morihito's energy since ogres have more energy than normal human.
Ban (番)
A dragon familiar Nico summoned after she was turned into a child. She is a avid drinker with a gambling problem, and a lazy slacker, but a protective and caring familiar. She has the power to change into a human form, and can change the temperature of her breath in order to produce flames or freezing vapor.

=== Witches ===
In the series, "witch" refers to people who have magical power. Witches generally believe in making good deeds for people, whereas those who misuse magic for their selfish gain are referred to as warlocks; they act as the main antagonists in the story. The warlocks are after Nico's ability in order to resurrect the previous "Witch of Thousand" Jura; their main purpose is to create paradise for the witches. Modern day witches are capable of detecting a presence of warlocks from certain distance. While most witches are women, there are some male witches.

Nemu Miyao (宮尾 音夢, Miyao Nemu)
Voiced by: Tomori Kusunoki (Japanese); Cristina Vee (English)
The "Shape-Shifting Witch" (変身の魔女, Henshin no Majo), whose family specializes in the magic form. Nemu lives in the town over from Nico's. She is capable of transforming into a black cat, but automatically reverts back when she sleeps. As she dreams of having a strong humanoid familiar, mainly for the servitude benefits it could provide, Nemu frequently comes to the Otogi household to recruit Morihito to be her familiar, but always fails because she always timidly turns into her cat form, leading Morihito and the others to dote on her. This in turn makes her fall asleep, but she is always able to flee while the rest get distracted, leaving humiliated but otherwise intact. She ultimately approaches the group as a human to assist them against the warlock contracted with Keigo, leading her to become friendly with the household and frequently visit as a human as well. Despite this, only Wolf knows of her secret, having learned it during the fight with the warlock. Wolf agrees to keep her secret, on the condition that Nemu visit the house and enable his transformation once a month. Nemu later gives up on recruiting Morihito out of respect for Nico's feelings for him, and in turn starts developing feelings for both Keigo and Wolf.
Momo Kuramochi (倉持 桃, Kuramochi Momo) / Momochi (モモチ)
A 19-year-old "Witch of Teleportation" (移動の魔女, Idō no Majo) who is capable to teleport anyone but at the cost of her body weight. As a teenager, she was struggling with how her body easily gets fat. After learning that she's always been a witch, Momo started to embraces her body and keeps her body weight so that she could help people in need. She moves to Morihito's neighborhood to support Nico. She has a motherly personality and tends to spoil the residents in Otogi household.
Mii Tsuchiya (土屋 美依, Tsuchiya Mii)
A fifth year elementary student who is the "Witch of Summon" (召喚の魔女, Shōkan no Majo). She is also a child actress. She has a genie familiar called Slump that follows her and acts as her servant. She is a well-meaning but spoiled girl. She respects Nico's mother after she helped her when her magic powers first awakened.

=== Asunaro Private High School ===
==== Nico and Morihito's class ====
Yuri Makuwa (真桑 悠里, Makuwa Yūri)
Voiced by: Mikako Komatsu (Japanese); Rosie Okumura (English)
The homeroom teacher in Nico's class who is popular in the school for her "cool-beauty" personality. In reality, she is a closet otaku who is desperate to hide this side of her from her students. She and Kukumi become otaku friends through their shared favorite manga, Uron Mirage, where two of them later form a doujin circle called "Fave Artist File" (オシエシニッシ, Oshieshinisshi).
Kara Minami (南 伽羅, Minami Kara)
Voiced by: Rie Takahashi (Japanese); Erica Mendez (English)
One of Nico's best friends in high school. She is incredibly friendly and always willing to make friends with people that are struggling socially, though she is often embarrassed about it afterwards. Thus, Kara is very welcoming about Nico's real identity. She is a priestess in training at her family's shrine. When playing around with one of Nico's spells, she accidentally creates a Shikigami familiar she nicknames "Shiki".
Kukumi Ureshino (嬉野 久々実, Ureshino Kukumi)
Voiced by: Konomi Kohara (Japanese); Xanthe Huynh (English)
Nico's other best friend in high school, nicknamed "Kuku". She used to be a shy otaku in middle school until Kara befriended her, breaking her out of her shell while still retaining her otaku hobby. She is also a fan artist with more than 10,000 followers on Chitter, one of whom is Yuri. Upon discovering this, they quickly become friends, much to Yuri's dismay.
Suzuka Kiyomiya (清宮 涼華, Kiyomiya Suzuka)
Voiced by: Yū Serizawa (Japanese); Brianna Knickerbocker (English)
A girl who comes from a traditional family. She excels in anything, but is clumsy when it comes to applying it into practice. Her older brother is the student council president, Tenryu Kiyomiya.
Kowashi Hara (原 毅, Hara Kowashi)
Voiced by: Haruki Ishiya (Japanese); Lucien Dodge (English)
A male student with weak stomach but is too afraid of asking for toilet permission because he was teased in the past. He asked Nico for a spell that allows him goes unnoticed during those times. His name is a homophone of Japanese word for diarrhea (腹壊し, harakowashi).
Komugi Kurowa (黒和 小麦, Kurowa Komugi)
Voiced by: Kana Ichinose (Japanese); Lisa Reimold (English)
A twin-braided girl whose family owns a bakery and somehow can understand bread puns. It is later revealed that Komugi is a warlock who is able to control the ground and is after Nico's ability as well.

==== Student Council ====
Tenryu Kiyomiya (清宮 天流, Kiyomiya Tenryū)
Voiced by: Yoshitsugu Matsuoka (Japanese); Howard Wang (English)
The student council president. He comes from a very traditional family, and hires students who act like stereotypical anime tropes, even though they are not qualified, forcing him to do all of the work. He has been trying to make Morihito joins the student council, as he thinks Morihito is the "cool, obedient fighting guy" trope. He also always has his hand on the lid of his hat and is actually able to take his hat off, but refuses to let it go.
Ibara Ibu (伊武 荊, Ibu Ibara)
Voiced by: Miyuki Sawashiro (Japanese); Laura Post (English)
The vice president alongside Yuzuru. Ibara leads the council in Tenryu's absence. Due to her appearance, Morihito initially thought that she was a promiscuous adult who illegally entered the school grounds. Her behavior resembles a mix between Takarazuka's otokoyaku and a mature older sister.
Yuzuru Kenmochi (剣持 弓弦, Kenmochi Yuzuru)
Voiced by: Jun Fukuyama (Japanese); Khoi Dao (English)
The other vice president who is always seen with eyes closed, looks suspicious, talks in a Kansai dialect, and only opens his eyes when he says "important stuff". He fits the anime and manga archetype of mysterious and devious characters, the over-obviousness of which constantly shocks Morihito and the others.
Syrup Amai (甘井 シロップ, Amai Shiroppu)
Voiced by: Rie Kugimiya (Japanese); Kimoy Lee (English)
Student council's secretary. She dresses in Western-style lolita fashion and acts like a tsundere. She is Kuromitsu's older twin sister, who is also her translator. Despite their petit figure, both Syrup and Kuromitsu are high schoolers.
Kuromitsu Amai (甘井 黒蜜, Amai Kuromitsu) / Kuromitsu (クロミツ)
Voiced by: Misaki Kuno (Japanese); Kimberley Anne Campbell (English)
The other student council's secretary. She dresses in Japanese-style horror fashion and acts like a kuudere. Kuromitsu always speaks in misleading evil poetry and has her older sister Syrup to translates for her. Her speech pattern leads Morihito into thinking she might be a witch disguised as a normal human, but in reality she really is just an ordinary girl.
Riro Takumi (工 理路, Takumi Riro)
Voiced by: Noriko Hidaka (Japanese); Sarah Natochenny (English)
A short-figured first year high school boy who is the treasurer in the council. He is also a genius hacker who often hack into trivial things like Morihito's smartphone or the Shōnen Magazine editorial office.
Asuto Ishiba (石破 明日人, Ishiba Asuto) / Burst (バースト, Bāsuto)
Voiced by: Kenta Miyake (Japanese); Mick Lauer (English)
The student council spokesman whose appearance is big and muscular. He is also hot-blooded. Ironically, he is the most enthusiastic when it comes to his work in the student council.
Kyoki Saiko (西古 凶奇, Saiko Kyōki)
Voiced by: Jun Fukushima (Japanese); Andrew Russell (English)
A student council member who is in charge of general affairs. He tends to lick knives and pretending to be a psychotic, but usually ends up cutting his own tongue.
Daiki Sakai Mk. II (酒井 大樹マークII, Sakai Daiki Māku II)
Voiced by: Hikaru Midorikawa (Japanese); Jonathon Ha (English)
A boy who wears a cardboard mask and acts like a robot. He is also in charge of general affairs. Ironically, he is the only one who wears his school uniform properly in the student council.

==== Other students ====
Jun Horai (蓬莱 純, Hōrai Jun)
Voiced by: Daiki Yamashita (Japanese); Landon McDonald (English)
Kanshi's classmate who speaks like the Japanese translated version of English textbooks. This is apparently because both of his parents work as English teachers and he grew up by reading their teaching materials. He is struggling with confessing his love towards a girl from other school because of his speech pattern, only to find out the girl also speaks like him.

Rui Fujiki (藤木 累, Fujiki Rui) / Jekyll (ジキル, Jikiru)
Voiced by: Yōhei Azakami (Japanese); Jonathon Ha (English)
The student council president of the middle school Miharu transferred to, before the two enrolled to Asunaro. A descendant to Dr. Jekyll, his body tends to gradually build up violent urges before it gets released on its own. After he saves Miharu from the thugs, Fujiki learns about the latter's vampire identity and the two start sharing a mutual symbiotic relationship: Miharu feeds from Fujiki's energy, while Fujiki is relieved of his violent urges. He has strong interest in non-human creatures.

=== Warlocks ===
Ayako Makinose (牧之瀬 文子, Makinose Ayako)
Voiced by: Kujira, Aino Shimada (young) (Japanese); Jessica Gee-George, Xanthe Huynh (young) (English)
An elderly woman known as the Enchanter (付与の魔女, Fuyo no Majo). Growing up in a strict household, she ran away from home after graduating in order to avoid an arranged marriage. At some point, she discovered that she had levitation magic and she used it for shoplifting. Later on, she was approached by a mysterious warlock who offered her great power in exchange of making her diminutive.
Ryohei Fuchi (淵亮平, Fuchi Ryōhei)
Voiced by: Kazuyuki Okitsu (Japanese); Khoi Dao (English)
Known as the Water Warlock (水の黒魔女(ウォーロック), Mizu no Wōrokku), Ryohei can use magic to manipulate large bodies of water. After being swindled by a loan shark, he fell off a bridge and nearly drowned before awakening his power. His magic is removed using Nico and Miharu's abilities, and Miharu's father takes him in to help him repent for his actions. He stutters when he speaks.
Shikimi (樒)
Known as the Forest Witch (森の魔女, Mori no Majo), he can use magic to manipulate plant life. He desires to revive Jura, a powerful warlock from the past, and he requires Nico to do so. Although he is rarely seen, he is responsible for many of the Otogi household's many battles by manipulating others.

=== Characters appearing in Uron Mirage ===
Uron Mirage (うろんミラージュ) is an in-universe fantasy battle manga series by "Moko Utakata" and published in Weekly Shōnen Jump. The manga and its anime adaptation tell the story of a group of young swordsmen who hunt monsters. The series is notably of rather poor quality, but it attracts fans who acknowledge this yet are nonetheless invested, in large part due to its fan fiction. It is the favorite manga of Yuri and Kukumi, the latter of whom is also one of its most popular fan artists.

Utsuro Akizuki (秋月 空, Akizuki Utsuro)
Voiced by: Ryoko Shiraishi (Japanese); Casey Mongillo (English)
Utsuro is the rookie of Feint, a swordsmen group, whose catchphrase is "go in one go".

Oboro Namisaki (浪崎 朧, Namisaki Oboro)
Voiced by: Hiroyuki Yoshino (Japanese); Kevin Andrew Rivera (English)
Oboro is the lone wolf of Feint. He is conscious of ranking and considers Utsuro to be his rival.
Sagiri Kusama (草間 狭霧, Kusama Sagiri)
Voiced by: Hiro Shimono (Japanese); Alejandro Saab (English)
Sagiri is a senior of Utsuro and Oboro who deliberately say cynical remarks in order to train them.
Zack Balan (ザック・バラン, Zakku Baran)
Voiced by: Tomokazu Sugita (Japanese); Mick Lauer (English)
Zack is a mysterious man who wears a lion mask. He is a powerful swordsman.
Fuwa (不破)
Voiced by: Hōchū Ōtsuka (Japanese); Jake Eberle (English)
Fuwa is the commander of Feint who always answers questions vaguely, leading people to wonder if he is going to commit a coup d'état.
Honoka Shirabushi (白藤 仄, Shirabushi Honoka)
Voiced by: Ami Koshimizu (Japanese); Ariana Nicole George (English)
Honoka is Fuwa's secretary who always receives Fuwa's rude remarks, but remains unfazed.

== Production ==
Kenta Shinohara revealed that it takes five days to draw the characters in Witch Watch, while the storyboards take two and a half days. In January 2023, Shinohara stated on Twitter that Witch Watch would probably be his last weekly serial. He explained that he is "physically unable" to do one, even if he wanted to. The February 6, 2023 chapter of the manga began a crossover with Shinohara's previous Weekly Shōnen Jump series, Sket Dance.

== Media ==
=== Manga ===
Witch Watch is written and illustrated by Kenta Shinohara. The manga was serialized in Shueisha's shōnen manga magazine Weekly Shōnen Jump from February 8, 2021, to November 16, 2026. Shueisha has collected its chapters into individual tankōbon volumes. The first volume was released on June 4, 2021. As of October 2, 2026, 28 volumes have been released.

Witch Watch has been licensed for simultaneous publication in North America as it is released in Japan, with its chapters being digitally launched by Viz Media on its Shonen Jump website. Shueisha also simulpublishes the series in English for free on the Manga Plus app and website. Viz Media also publishes its volumes in digital format.

=== Voice comic ===
In February 2022, a three-part video of "dubbed manga" were posted online. In May 2022, another series of voice comic adaptations that highlights the comedic parts were posted. The characters are voiced by three voice actors: Mikako Komatsu, Yoshitsugu Matsuoka, and Jun Fukushima. Yumiri Hanamori joined the cast in August 2022.

Another voice comic featuring the franchise's in-universe manga series, Uron Mirage, was also posted online in June 2022 as part of the celebration for the manga's volume 6 release. The voice comic features voice acting by Shōya Chiba, Ryōta Suzuki, Yūichirō Umehara, and Tomokazu Sugita.

=== Anime ===
An anime television series adaptation was announced in August 2024. It was produced by Bibury Animation Studios and directed by Hiroshi Ikehata, with assistant direction by Masao Kawase, series composition by Deko Akao, characters designed by Haruko Iizuka, and music composed by Yukari Hashimoto. The series aired from April 6 to October 5, 2025, in the Nichigo time slot on all JNN affiliates, including MBS and TBS. It ran for two consecutive cours. The first opening theme song is "Watch Me!", performed by Yoasobi, while the first ending theme song is "Mahō wa Spice" (魔法はスパイス; lit. "Magic Is Spice"), performed by Aooo. The second opening theme song is "Tokihanate!" (ときはなて！; lit. "Unleash!") by Hashimero, while the second ending theme song is "Tsuki to Watashi no Kakurenbo" (月と私のかくれんぼ; lit. "Hide and Seek with the Moon") by Yutori.

The in-universe anime series Uron Mirage is featured in episodes 14 and 23. Who-ya extended performed the opening theme "Bitter end", while ALI performed the ending theme "Flashback Syndrome".

GKIDS acquired the license to the series in North America with Crunchyroll and Netflix streaming the series worldwide, alongside other platforms such as Hulu (United States), Animation Digital Network (several European territories) and Aniplus (South Korea). Tropics Entertainment licensed the series in Southeast Asia. The anime's first three episodes were also screened in theaters outside of Japan under the title Witch Watch: Watch Party with screenings beginning March 13 in Asia and in North America on March 16 via GKIDS.

Following the airing of the final episode, a second season was announced. It will be co-produced by Studio Massket, with Kaishū Sugimura and Yuki Sawa designing the characters with Iizuka. The season is set to premiere in 2027.

==== Episodes ====
No.	Title	Directed by (Note: Production staff information is taken from the ending credits of each episode.)	Written by	Storyboarded by	Chief animation directed by	Original release date
1	"Witch's Return"; Transliteration: "Majo no Kikan" (Japanese: 魔女の帰還)	Tatsunori Sakamoto & Hiroshi Ikehata	Deko Akao	Hiroshi Ikehata	Kaishū Sugimura	April 6, 2025
Morihito Otogi, a member of an ogre bloodline, learns that his childhood friend Nico Wakatsuki is returning home from witch training. It is ultimately decided that Morihito will live with Nico as her familiar and bodyguard. Nico arrives at Morihito's house and is eager to show off her newly learned magic spells to him. She cast a spell to turn herself into paper, but is accidentally blown away by the wind and trapped in a crevice between two walls. In order to save her, Morihito taps into his ogre powers and demolishes the wall, with Nico repairing it with her magic. Morihito then advises Nico not to use her magic in public, but she explains witches are oathbound to help others. They then come across a burning building and rescue a trapped woman, though Nico's spell to make her and Morihito lighter backfires when it wears off and temporarily makes them heavier. As Morihito and Nico prepare to start living together, Morihito recalls his father warning him that Nico's mother divined a prophecy that disaster would befall Nico within a year, and only Morihito will have the power to protect her.
2	"A Giant Rookie"; Transliteration: "Ōgata Rūkī" (Japanese: 大型ルーキー)	Masao Kawase	Deko Akao	Hiroshi Ikehata	Yuki Sawa	April 13, 2025
2	"Let's Go to a Diner!"; Transliteration: "Famiresu Iko!" (Japanese: ファミレス行こ！)	Masao Kawase	Deko Akao	Hiroshi Ikehata	Yuki Sawa	April 13, 2025
2	"The Flying Classroom"; Transliteration: "Tobu Kyōshitsu" (Japanese: 飛ぶ教室)	Masao Kawase	Deko Akao	Hiroshi Ikehata	Yuki Sawa	April 13, 2025
Morihito and Nico attend their first day of high school, with Morihito warning Nico not to reveal she is a witch or use any magic. However, during homeroom, Nico blows her cover when she accidentally casts an Embiggen spell on herself. As a result, she becomes the most popular girl in class. After class, classmates Kara Minami and Kukumi Ureshino ask Nico to eat with them at a nearby diner, which Nico accepts. They ignore the advances of a trio of delinquents as the enter the diner and quickly become friends, while Morihito secretly beats up the delinquents to prevent them from further harassing the girls. The next day, Nico's classmates asks her to show off her magic. She sets up a field that allows them to fly, but a truck accidentally drives into it, forcing Morihito to use his ogre powers to rescue the driver. Despite Morihito's fears, his classmates accept him as well.
3	"Fresh Transparent Fashions for Spring"; Transliteration: "Haru no Shīsurū Kōde" (Japanese: 春のシースルーコーデ)	Takuma Suzuki	Hiroko Fukuda (Note: Deko Akao was erroneously credited as writer in the ending credits for episode 3.)	Keiichiro Kawaguchi (Note: Hiroshi Ikehata was erroneously credited as storyboarder in the ending credits for episode 3.)	Masayuki Nonaka	April 20, 2025
3	"Witch's Delivery Service"; Transliteration: "Majo ni Takkyūbin" (Japanese: 魔女に宅急便)	Takuma Suzuki	Hiroko Fukuda	Keiichiro Kawaguchi	Masayuki Nonaka	April 20, 2025
3	"Lost Dogs and the Patter of Rain"; Transliteration: "Maigo Inu to Ame no Bīto" (Japanese: 迷子犬と雨のビート)	Takuma Suzuki	Hiroko Fukuda	Keiichiro Kawaguchi	Kaishū Sugimura	April 20, 2025
In an attempt to impress Morihito, Nico uses magic to conjure a fashionable outfit from a picture, but the back remains completely transparent, and gets embarrassed when she accidentally shows it to him. Despite that, he insists that Nico should just wear whatever makes her comfortable. Nico's mother Ibuki sends over Nico's manga collection as well as a letter for Morihito. Nico uses a duplication spell to make the moving easier, but ends up splitting into four child versions of herself. Morihito reads the letter, which warns him that "Dogs and raindrops will bring disaster." The weather soon turns to rain as an unknown figure spies on the house. Morihito becomes cautious when Nico insists on shopping during a rainy day, and spots a stranger wearing a dog mask stalking them. After a brief battle, the stranger reveals himself to be Kanshi Kazamatsuri, a tengu Nico befriended during her witch training. Kanshi insists on protecting Nico as well, claiming he is her crow familiar.
4	"Kanshi Kazamatsuri, The Tengu"; Transliteration: "Tengu -Kazamatsuri Kanshi-" (Japanese: 天狗 -風祭監志-)	Natsu Tsuda	Kazuho Hyodo	Chihiro Kumano	Kaishū Sugimura, Masayuki Nonaka & Yuki Sawa	April 27, 2025
Morihito interrogates Kanshi about his suspicious behavior, and the latter admits that due to the rivalry between the tengu and ogre clans, he wants to prove that tengu are superior to ogres. He also racked up significant debt, which Ibuki was willing to cover in return for becoming Nico's bodyguard. Kanshi then passes a new prophecy to Morihito, warning there is "An enemy within the school." However, neither Morihito nor Kanshi seem to get along so Nico tries to smooth things over with a "Friendeal" spell. However, the spell backfires and makes Morihito overenthusiastic about becoming Kanshi's friend, which scares him off. Nico dispels the Friendeal spell and apologizes to her friends, but she is suddenly attacked and abducted by a possessed dress. Morihito and Kanshi are forced to work together, with Kanshi using his control over wind to help Morihito catch up with the dress and destroy it. Realizing their enemy is more dangerous than they thought, Morihito and Kanshi decide to overcome their personal grudges and join forces, with Kanshi moving in to live with Morihito and Nico.
5	"My Student Is My Favorite Artist"; Transliteration: "Oshiego ga Oshi Eshi Datta Ken" (Japanese: 教え子が推し絵師だった件)	Yūma Imura	Deko Akao	Daisuke Eguchi	Masayuki Nonaka	May 4, 2025
5	"My Tummy Is Tender Today"; Transliteration: "Kyō wa Hebī na Sutomakku" (Japanese: 今日はヘビーなストマック)	Yūma Imura	Deko Akao	Daisuke Eguchi	Seigo Saitō	May 4, 2025
5	"Cat Scout"; Transliteration: "Kyatto Sukauto" (Japanese: キャットスカウト)	Yūma Imura	Deko Akao	Daisuke Eguchi	Kaishū Sugimura	May 4, 2025
Yuri by chance discovers that Kukumi is actually one of her favorite manga fan artists she follows online. Kukumi also discovers both she and Yuri are fans of the same manga, and encourages her to be more open about her hobbies. Classmate Kowashi Hara asks Nico to cast a spell that will make him unnoticeable, so he will not draw attention whenever he has to go to the bathroom. She casts a special Mobliviate spell that suppresses his presence, but he realizes he does not actually need it since his self-consciousness is unfounded. He thanks Nico for her help anyways, which empowers the special witch gem she carries, signifying she is one step closer to becoming a true witch. Another witch, Nemu Miyao, secretly stalks Morihito, intending to have him be her familiar, but she is too shy to actually approach him. She follows him home disguised as a cat, but suddenly develops a crush on him when he demonstrates to Nico and Kanshi how to properly pet a cat. Flustered, Nemu make her escape and swears to make Morihito her familiar.
6	"Under the Lovers' Tree"; Transliteration: "Enmusubi no Ki no Shita de" (Japanese: 縁結びの樹の下で)	Enishi Ōshima	Kazuho Hyodo	Enishi Ōshima	Enishi Ōshima (Note: De facto via animation director credits)	May 11, 2025
After crafting a special charm to help a classmate with her love confession, Nico notices that Morihito is growing increasingly popular among the girls at school. Kanshi tries to help her gain Morihito's attention romantically, but it end up backfiring. Later, one of Nico's male classmates, Ishii, asks to talk her privately during an upcoming field trip. Kara believes that Ishii plans to confess his feelings to Nico under a known lovers' tree. Kanshi overhears the conversation and suggests to Nico that she use the opportunity to confess to Morihito. During the field trip, Morihito meets a classmate, Keigo Magami, and find they have similar interests in subculture. Meanwhile, when Nico finds out Ishii and his friends want love charms from her, she shrinks herself to hide from them and accidentally falls into Morihito's shirt pocket. She witnesses a girl confess to Morithito, but he turns her down saying he has already fallen in love with someone precious to him, which worries Nico. Nico recalls the moment she fell in love with Morihito. Afterwards, Nico and Morihito eat lunch under a smaller, less prominent tree, unaware that it is the real lovers' tree.
7	"Kan and Nico's Channel"; Transliteration: "Kan Niko Channeru" (Japanese: カンニコチャンネル)	Kiichi Ueki	Hiroko Fukuda	Hiroaki Shimura	Kaishū Sugimura	May 18, 2025
7	"The Tea Ceremony Is a Piece of Tea Cake"; Transliteration: "Ocha no Kokoro wa Ocha no Ko Saisai" (Japanese: お茶の心はお茶の子さいさい)	Kiichi Ueki	Hiroko Fukuda	Hiroaki Shimura	Kaishū Sugimura	May 18, 2025
Nico and Kanshi start a "WJTube" channel in hopes of making easy money, but Morihito points out they have no followers because their videos are low quality and have no focus. Morihito teams up with Keigo to revamp Nico and Kanshi's channel. Their new videos end up very successful, but Nico and Kanshi quickly lose interest and quit. Classmate Suzuka Kiyomiya asks Nico to help her find a way to complete an upcoming tea ceremony test. Nico casts a "Synclone" spell on Morihito and Suzuka that allows them to synchronize their movements, so Morihito can complete the tea ceremony in Suzuka's stead. However, due to a last minute schedule change, they are forced to perform the tea ceremony without a rehearsal and end up failing. Fortunately, Morihito uses his martial arts skill to save Suzuka's grandmother from a giant hornet, convincing her to withdraw the failure. Suzuka later asks Morihito to help her with her next test, which he flatly refuses.
8	"Kanshi's Part-Time Job Diaries ~The Superhero Show~"; Transliteration: "Kanshi no Baito Nikki ~Hīrō Shō~" (Japanese: カンシのバイト日記〜ヒーローショー〜)	Daishi Kaito	Chika Suzumura	Naisho Nanoha	Seigo Saitō	May 25, 2025
8	"Kanshi's Part-Time Job Diaries ~The Side Job~"; Transliteration: "Kanshi no Baito Nikki ~Naishoku~" (Japanese: カンシのバイト日記〜内職〜)	Daishi Kaito	Chika Suzumura	Naisho Nanoha	Seigo Saitō	May 25, 2025
In order to earn money for living expenses, Kanshi is forced to take a part-time job in a hero show. Once he is given the role of Otto-man, he finds out that he has replaced the previous actor, Hironaka, who is playing the role of the villain Metaboli due to an injury. Hearing how disappointed Hironaka's son was about the situation, Kanshi secretly switches roles with Hironaka. While the show is a huge success, the director refuses to pay Kanshi. Kanshi takes a job packing screws, but has trouble dealing with the monotonous work. Despite warnings, he convinces Nico to cast a spell to make him move ten times faster. However, in relative time, while the spell is supposed to last three days, the duration is 30 days from Kanshi's perspective. His inability to communicate or interact with other people takes a serious toll on him until he is able to adjust to slowing his own movements to compensate. However, when the spell finally wears off, Kanshi has to readjust to living in normal time.
9	"Dear Kara"; Transliteration: "Kara e" (Japanese: 伽羅へ)	Kou Horio	Hiroko Fukuda	Kou Horio	Kaishū Sugimura	June 1, 2025
9	"New Friends"; Transliteration: "Atarashii Tomodachi" (Japanese: 新しい友達)	Kou Horio	Hiroko Fukuda	Kou Horio	Masayuki Nonaka	June 1, 2025
9	"Date With the Knight"; Transliteration: "Dēto Wizu za Naito" (Japanese: デート・ウィズ・ザ・ナイト)	Kou Horio	Hiroko Fukuda	Kou Horio	Masayuki Nonaka	June 1, 2025
Kara approaches Nico to seek help to reconstruct a letter from her deceased mother that her father shredded. Nico, Morihito, and Kara work together to restore it, which reveals Kara's mother was not actually her birth mother. However, Kara feels that this revelation does not change their relationship and she reconciles with her father. Afterward, an inspired Nico puts up an advertisement in school so anybody can come seek her assistance. A classmate of Kanshi's named Jun Horai approaches Nico for help in talking to a girl he likes. He successfully starts dating Ann Nikura, the girl in question who talks in a similar stilted fashion. They gift Nico and Morihito a pair of movie tickets as thanks. Nico gets anxious about her upcoming date with Morihito, as she finds it difficult to read his emotions. With his consent, Nico casts a spell on Morihito that creates a miniature version of him that expresses the emotions he feels. Morihito later admits that he was conditioned to be stoic due to his training, but he feels that he has started to become more expressive with Nico and his new friends around.
10	"Trope-tacular Student Council"; Transliteration: "Betabeta Seitokai" (Japanese: ベタベタ生徒会)	Yasuo Fujii	Deko Akao	Momoko Natsuno	Seigo Saitō	June 8, 2025
10	"A Stray Cat's Bubble of Bliss"; Transliteration: "Kayoi Neko no Awai Hitotoki" (Japanese: 通い猫の泡いひととき)	Yasuo Fujii	Deko Akao	Momoko Natsuno	Kaishū Sugimura	June 8, 2025
Nico and Morihito are informed by the student council that the use of magic has been banned at school for safety reasons. However, they both notice all of the student council members follow generic anime tropes. The student council president, Tenryu Kiyomiya, explains that he is willing to rescind the ban if Morihito joins them, which the latter refuses. Morihito then watches a video about the student council and realizes Tenryu is similar to him. Tenryu then chases down Morihito, declaring he will find a way to recruit him into the student council. Nemu attempts to visit Morihito at his home, but is too nervous to meet him directly and instinctively transforms into her cat form. Morihito takes Nemu into the house where Nico accidentally spills a drink on her. Morihito gives Nemu a bath and while he is drying her off, she accidentally falls asleep and transforms back to human form. Fortunately, Morihito, Nico, and Kanshi are distracted, allowing her to escape without notice. However, she then comes across a warlock planning to kidnap Nico, and runs back to try and warn her.
11	"Dogs and Raindrops"; Transliteration: "Inu to Uteki" (Japanese: 犬と雨滴)	Kousuke Hirota	Kazuho Hyodo	Momoko Natsuno	Masayuki Nonaka, Seigo Saitō & Enishi Ōshima	June 15, 2025
12	"Dogs and Raindrops"; Transliteration: "Inu to Uteki" (Japanese: 犬と雨滴)	Hiroshi Ikehata, Masao Kawase, Yūsuke Onoda & Yūichirō Aoki	Deko Akao	Hiroshi Ikehata	Kaishū Sugimura, Manamu Amasaki, Masayuki Nonaka, Yuki Ikeda & Yoshiki Masui	June 22, 2025
Nemu warns Nico and Morihito about the warlock, explaining that Nico is a target due to being the "Witch of Thousands", an extremely rare and powerful type of witch. Meanwhile, Kanshi rescues Keigo from a bully who has been taking enchanted candy as a performance enhancer. He learns the candy is being distributed by another student only known as "Wolf" and tries to track him down, only to be beaten up by him. As Nico heals Kanshi's wounds, Nemu explains the warlock must be using the candy as a method to control the minds of whoever ingests it. When Nemu retraces her steps, she figures out the warlock is hiding in a magically created space. Nemu finds her way inside but is captured. Elsewhere, Keigo warns Morihito that Wolf has sent out a summons to his "Dogs". As they head out to confront the warlock, Keigo lures Morihito into a trap and transports him to the warlock's hideout. Keigo then reveals that he is actually the warlock's werewolf familiar, having made a deal to heal an old leg wound that prevents him from figure skating. Keigo soon transforms into his werewolf alter ego, Wolf, and prepares to battle Morihito. Both Morihito and Wolf battle each other, but it is evident that Wolf has the upper hand in a direct fight. Meanwhile, Nico and Kanshi head to the park to face the Enchanter. Using a clever strategy, they are able to ambush and capture the Enchanter, who admits that she was ordered by a much higher ranking warlock to capture Nico. Nemu regains consciousness and arrives at the park, and coerces the Enchanter to lead to back to her closed space. Morihito briefly gains the upper hand with Nico's help, but she runs out of magical energy. The Enchanter then boasts that her and Keigo's lives are linked through their familiar pact. Despite the setback, Morihito is able to outsmart and defeat Wolf. Afterward, the Enchanter tries to tell Nico the name of mastermind but is suddenly killed by a spell that drains all her magic, which also neutralizes her pact with Keigo. Keigo apologizes to everybody and admits that in reality, he wanted to heal his mother's injuries. Once Nico helps him, Keigo decides to become her bodyguard as repayment, moving into Morihito's house to live with them.
13	"Keigo Magami, the Werewolf"; Transliteration: "Ōkami Otoko -Magami Keigo-" (Japanese: 狼男 -真神圭護-)	Yuki Ikeda	Chika Suzumura	Ice Mugino	Manamu Amazaki	June 29, 2025
13	"Kind Tiger, Proud Wolf"; Transliteration: "Zennin no Tora Kōman no Ōkami" (Japanese: 善人の虎高慢の狼)	Yuki Ikeda	Chika Suzumura	Ice Mugino	Manamu Amazaki	June 29, 2025
13	"Easy Spices for Enthralling Cooking"; Transliteration: "Otegaru Chōmiryō" (Japanese: お手軽超魅了)	Yuki Ikeda	Chika Suzumura	Ice Mugino	Manamu Amazaki	June 29, 2025
Keigo tries to adjust to living with Morihito and his friends, and warns that seeing anything crescent shaped will trigger his transformation. Despite everyone's best effort, Keigo transforms after seeing a croissant. When Keigo eventually returns, he apologizes for the trouble. He then admits that he admires Wolf. Nemu returns to Morihito's house in her cat form. When Wolf recognizes her, he privately offers to keep quiet as long as she helps him transform once a month, which she complies. Because Nico is not very good at cooking, she sprinkles a special capcharm powder on her food. Morihito witnesses what she is doing and manages to take his plate before Nico can season it. Soon after eating, Nico, Kanshi, and Keigo fall in love with the dish. The powder is later inadvertently spilled on Nico and blown all over the city, causing multiple people to fall in love with her. Morihito kisses Nico on the cheek to break the spell. While Nico is disappointed Morihito is seemingly not making a big show of it, he is secretly anxious about what happened.
14	"Uron Mirage Chapter 119: The Phasey Hunt, Part 4"; Transliteration: "Uron Mirāju Dai-Hyakujūkyū-wa: 'Fajī Tōbatsu - 4'" (Japanese: うろんミラージュ 第119話 「ファジー討伐 - 4」)	Masao Kawase	Chika Suzumura	Ikuo Geso	Manamu Amazaki	July 6, 2025
14	"Diary of My Favorite Artist"; Transliteration: "Oshi Eshi Nisshi" (Japanese: 推し絵師日誌)	Yūsuke Onoda	Chika Suzumura	Ice Mugino	Kaishū Sugimura	July 6, 2025
Nico and her friends watch an episode of the hit anime Uron Mirage, which Nico insists is very popular. However, Morihito is left confused and does not understand the appeal of the series. Yuri and Kukumi both bond over their shared love for the Uron Mirage anime. However, Yuri still hides the fact that she is "Dengeki Melon", one of Kukumi's most passionate online supporters. Kukumi then shows Yuri a draft of a manga she is working on. Yuri immediately spots many flaws in her work, but holds back from saying anything herself and instead sends Kukumi constructive criticism as Dengeki Melon. The next day, Kukumi thanks Yuri for her advice, having figured out she is Dengeki Melon. She then recruits Yuri to be the writer for her next manga.
15	"Summer Demon"; Transliteration: "Natsu no Mamono" (Japanese: 夏の魔物)	Toshiyuki Anzai	Deko Akao	Hiroshi Ikehata	Masayuki Nonaka	July 13, 2025
Nico and Morihito receive a new prophecy instructing them to "visit the ancient retainer that exorcises evil". The group plus Nemu decide to travel to a nearby mountain where the retainer resides, and meet Miharu Kiryu and his father Masumi. Masumi explains that the Kiryus are exorcists experienced in eliminating demons. The group decides to first spend some time having fun in the nearby river since it is summer vacation until the Water Warlock ambushes them. Miharu then intervenes, easily defeating the warlock, but he is mortally wounded in the process. Near death, Miharu heals himself by draining some of Morihito's ogre energy. Masumi later explains that the Kiryus are vampires, but instead of blood they have evolved to feed off magical energy. Miharu offers to execute the warlock, but Nico insists that they us Miharu's Drain ability to permanently remove his powers instead. Afterward, the warlock confesses he was instructed by another warlock to capture Nico, and agrees to reform his life under Masumi's guidance. Realizing the prophecy is referring to Miharu, Morihito offers to have Miharu move into his home, which Miharu accepts.
16	"Miharu Kiryu, the Vampire"; Transliteration: "Kyūketsuki - Kiryū Miharu -" (Japanese: 吸血鬼 - 霧生見晴 -)	Koso	Kazuho Hyodo	Momoko Natsuno	Mika Nishiyama	July 20, 2025
16	"Missing Parasol"; Transliteration: "Kasa ga Nai" (Japanese: 傘がない)	Koso	Kazuho Hyodo	Momoko Natsuno	Manamu Amazaki	July 20, 2025
16	"I'm So Glad You're Here"; Transliteration: "Aete Ureshii" (Japanese: 会えて嬉しい)	Koso	Kazuho Hyodo	Momoko Natsuno	Aoi Oshima	July 20, 2025
The group begin to adjust with Miharu being their newest housemate. Upon learning Morihito handles most of the chores, Miharu unsuccessfully organizes the rest of the group to cook a meal for him as thanks. Morihito insists Miharu does not need to do anything for him, but is glad that he has been able to adjust to living with them. Miharu gets angry at Kanshi for losing his parasol. As a temporary measure, Nico casts a Cloud Crown spell on him. On the way to get a replacement parasol, Miharu comes across the thief who stole his. However, his cloud disperses in response to his feelings. Kanshi summons crows to shield Miharu from the sun so he can defeat the thief and take his parasol back. As part of her deal with Wolf, Nemu arrives at Morihito's home to transform Keigo. However, their mutual awkwardness makes things difficult. While watching a movie together, they have a conversation about their respective circumstances. After a while, Nemu successfully tricks Keigo into transforming, but muses that she actually likes him when he is not trying to be cool.
17	"We Got Trapped in a Death Game, but It Sucked"; Transliteration: "Desu Gēmu Idomareta kedo..." (Japanese: デスゲーム挑まれたけど...)	Madoka Yaguchi	Deko Akao	Kaishū Sugimura	Manamu Amazaki	July 27, 2025
17	"Long Long a Go Go"	Madoka Yaguchi	Deko Akao	Kaishū Sugimura	Manamu Amazaki	July 27, 2025
Morihito, Kanshi, Keigo, and Miharu wake up to find themselves trapped in a death game by a man named Jig-Jag, who is holding Nico hostage. However, the boys discover that Jig-Jag's rules for his game, "Ouroboros", are not actually very good and they start revising them. Morihito then explains he figured out Jig-Jag is actually Keigo, and the Keigo with them is a Doppelganger created by Nico, who is his accomplice. Keigo admits he wanted to make a viral video, but the video of his friends fixing his game goes viral anyway. During a meeting, Tenryu informs Morihito and his friends that the school faculty is considering classifying them as "dangerous students" due to their supernatural powers. However, various parts of their bodies suddenly grow in length due to Nico miscasting a Enlongen spell. While attempting to sneak back to Morihito's home, they end up saving a man's life. Impressed that Morihito and his friends are willing to help others, Tenryu decides to take no further action against them. Nico then tries to dispel Enlongen, only to accidentally miscast it again.
18	"Kara and Shiki"; Transliteration: "Kara-chan to Shiki" (Japanese: カラちゃんとシキ)	Kanta Shiba	Hiroko Fukuda	Futoshi Higashide	Kaishū Sugimura	August 3, 2025
18	"Mega Marble Mania Madness"; Transliteration: "Kyōsō no Bīda Mania" (Japanese: 狂騒のビーダマニア)	Kanta Shiba	Hiroko Fukuda	Futoshi Higashide	Kaishū Sugimura	August 3, 2025
18	"Scramble Scrap Squad"; Transliteration: "Sukuranburu Sukurappu Sukuwaddo" (Japanese: スクランブル・スクラップ・スクワッド)	Kanta Shiba	Hiroko Fukuda	Futoshi Higashide	Manamu Amazaki	August 3, 2025
While volunteering at Kara's family shrine, Nico's experiments with enchanted paper ultimately leads to Kara creating a shikigami she names Shiki. On the way home from school, Shiki accidentally drops Kara's treasured hairclip gifted by her late mother into a river. Feeling guilty, Shiki dives into the river and recovers it. Afterward, Kara and Shiki reach a compromise where the latter is placed onto the former's hairclip. As a prank to prove his salesman skills, Kanshi manages to convince Keigo to buy a random marble. Keigo then makes a video about it, which goes viral. Seeing how far the prank has gone, Kanshi eventually comes clean to his friends. Once the marble craze dies down, Keigo, Nico and Kanshi post an apology video on Keigo's channel. While searching through his things, Morihito uncovers an old manga that he drawn. Nico casts a spell to transport everybody into the manga, but ends up turning everybody into drawings instead. When the wind blows one of the pages away, the group chases after it. While recovering the page, they help stop a robbery. Nico turns everybody back to normal and they head home, albeit they forget about Kanshi.
19	"Letter from a Friend"; Transliteration: "Tomodachi no Tegami" (Japanese: ともだちの手紙)	Fumihiro Ueno	Kazuho Hyodo	Momoko Natsuno	Masayuki Nonaka	August 10, 2025
Nemu comes to visit the house when Morihito uncovers an old letter sent to him by Nico when they were young. Morihito then takes his leave, with Nico explaining he is visiting his late mother's grave since it is the anniversary of her death. At her grave, Morihito apologizes for lying to her about having friends, and talks about how he first met Nico. They quickly befriended each other and Nico wrote a letter of friendship, only for bullies to tear it up. Nico got angry and attacked them with her magic, only to be calmed down by Morihito. He then pieced the letter back together and kept it as a keepsake. When Nico tells the same story to her friends, Nemu realizes Nico may have inadvertently cursed Morihito. Once she privately tells Kanshi and Keigo this, they have Nico cast a "Feelingram" spell to gauge Morihito's emotions. At first, the signs are disappointing. However, when Nico thanks Morihito for piecing the letter back together, the signs change to indicate Morihito does have feelings for Nico, they just have not fully blossomed yet. Encouraged, Nemu, Kanshi and Keigo decide they do not need to worry.
20	"The Lost Wolf and the Stray Cat"; Transliteration: "Mayoi Ōkami to Kayoi Neko" (Japanese: 迷い狼と通い猫)	Kyosuke Takada	Hiroko Fukuda	Kyosuke Takada	Ai Nomoto, Shōichi Shibuya, Hitoshi Kamata, & Shinichi Yoshikawa	August 17, 2025
Morihito, Kanshi, and Miharu defeat several gangsters looking for Nico, with Keigo feeling guilty he cannot do anything to help if he does not transform into Wolf. Recognizing Keigo's concern, Nico gifts him a ring enchanted with the Flowt spell. However, Flowt gets harder to control the higher the user is, and is also highly dependent on their mental condition. As a result, Keigo has difficulty getting used to it. Nemu then comes to visit and demonstrates to him how to use Flowt, which she had mastered as a child. When Nemu recalls how her mother cautioned her to protect her family's secrets, her sudden emotional distress causes her to lose control. Determined to save Nemu, Keigo draws upon his figure skating experience, using Flowt to skate across the ground and catch Nemu before she falls. It is then that Nemu realizes she has fallen in love with Keigo. Keigo then sees her crescent moon necklace and transforms into Wolf, who encourages Nemu to tell Keigo the truth about her shapeshifting. Nemu decides to put it off for now, and continues secretly visiting Keigo and his friends in her cat form.
21	"Secret Urges"; Transliteration: "Himitsu no Shōdō" (Japanese: 秘密の衝動)	Asahi Yoshimura	Chika Suzumura	Ice Mugino	Manamu Amazaki	August 24, 2025
21	"Keiko's Carefree Style"; Transliteration: "Keiko no Kimama Sutairu" (Japanese: ケイコの気ままスタイル)	Asahi Yoshimura	Chika Suzumura	Ice Mugino	Manamu Amazaki	August 24, 2025
21	"Jekyll Visits the Otogi House"; Transliteration: "Jikiru no Otogi-ke Hōmon" (Japanese: ジキルの乙木家訪問)	Asahi Yoshimura	Chika Suzumura	Ice Mugino	Masayuki Nonaka	August 24, 2025
As Miharu attends his middle school, he ends up thwarting a trio of bullies from robbing another student. However, he is chastised by student council president Rui Fujiki for interrupting his investigation. Later that day, Miharu learns about a masked student. On the way home, Miharu is ambushed by the bullies, but is saved by said masked student, who turns out to be Fujiki. Once Fujiki reveals that he is descended from Dr. Jekyll, he and Miharu become friends. This allows the latter to use Drain, helping suppress the former's violent urges. Nico casts a T.S. Revolution spell that temporarily genderswaps Keigo into a female named Keiko. Thanks to Keiko's popularity, Keigo make a channel dedicated to her. Eventually, Kanshi, Miharu, and even Morihito make appearances as their genderswapped versions. However, Keiko's channel gets suspended when Wolfy flashes her breasts during a livestream. Thanks to a mutual misunderstanding, Fujiki hangs out with members of the Asunaro Private High School student council. Once everything is eventually cleared up, Tenryu remarks that Fujiki will make a fine student council member when he enters high school. Fujiki later finally meets Miharu's friends.
22	"The Incredible Shrinking Adventure"	Yūsuke Onoda	Hiroko Fukuda	Chihiro Kumano	Kaishū Sugimura	August 31, 2025
22	"The Hamazaki Fall Bread Festival"; Transliteration: "Hamazaki Aki no Pan Matsuri" (Japanese: ハマザキ秋のパンまつり)	Koso	Hiroko Fukuda	Hiroshi Ikehata	Kaishū Sugimura	August 31, 2025
22	"Lucky Birthday"; Transliteration: "Rakkī Bāsudē" (Japanese: ラッキーバースデー)	Yūto Nakamura	Hiroko Fukuda	Hiroshi Ikehata	Kaishū Sugimura	August 31, 2025
When Kara brings over some donuts, Nico has the idea to shrink herself and Morihito to a smaller size. However, they quickly realize being shrunk is not as fun as they imagined, and Nico gets trapped in a piggy bank. With Shiki's help, Morihito is able to rescue Nico before the spell wears off. Classmate Komugi Kurowa asks Nico if there is a spell that allows her to read the mind of a boy she has a crush on named Hamazaki. Nico enchants a piece of bread to talk like Hamazaki, but it can only speak in bread puns. Trying to interpret bread Hamazaki's words, they believe that Hamazaki has a crush on Komugi as well, but it turns out he is already dating a girl with a similar name. Morihito's friends gift him a new pair of shoes for his birthday, and Nico casts a Fortunate Luck spell on him. As they observe Morihito experiencing numerous bad omens, Nico realizes she may have accidentally cast a bad luck spell on him instead. To their surprise, however, all the omens actually end up working in Morihito's favor.
23	"Our First Offline Meetup"; Transliteration: "Hajimete no Ofukai" (Japanese: はじめてのおふかい)	Koso	Kazuho Hyodo	Koso	Manamu Amazaki	September 14, 2025 (Note: Due to the coverages of the 2025 FIVB Men's Volleyball World Championship and the 2025 World Athletics Championships, episodes 23 and 25 were delayed one week.)
23	"Fave Artist File: Creative Surge"; Transliteration: "Oshieshi Nisshi Shippitsu Dotō-hen" (Japanese: オシエシニッシ 執筆怒濤編)	Koso	Kazuho Hyodo	Koso	Manamu Amazaki	September 14, 2025
23	"Fave Artist File: Crazy Event Arc"; Transliteration: "Oshieshi Nisshi Haran Kaijō-hen" (Japanese: オシエシニッシ 波瀾会場編)	Koso	Kazuho Hyodo	Koso	Manamu Amazaki	September 14, 2025
Kukumi and Yuri begin working on their doujinshi of Uron Mirage when Kukumi mentions her plan to meet an online friend of hers in person known as "Catch Me in the Limelight". A concerned Yuri secretly spies on the meeting and is relieved to see Limelight is actually a high school girl as Kukumi claimed. Limelight then names Kukumi and Yuri's doujin circle "Fave Fanart File". A sudden plot twist in Uron Mirage forces Yuri to rewrite the plot of the doujinshi, leaving Kukumi with only three weeks to draw it. Despite some setbacks, they are barely able to meet the deadline. With Yuri unable to go to a convention due to work, Kukumi recruits Nico to help manage their booth. While using her magic, Nico accidentally turns Morihito's hair white, which makes him resemble the Uron Mirage character, Oboro Namisaki. As a result, his appearance draws a massive audience. At the end of day, all of the copies of the doujinshi are sold. Inspired by the experience, both Kukumi and Yuri agree to work on a new one.
24	"Moi's Denim Devotion"; Transliteration: "Moi-chan no Denimu Dō" (Japanese: モイちゃんのデニム道)	Yūichirō Aoki	Deko Akao	Momoko Hatano	Masayuki Nonaka	September 21, 2025
24	"Date with the Guide"; Transliteration: "Dēto wizu za Gaido" (Japanese: デート・ウィズ・ザ・ガイド)	Yūichirō Aoki	Deko Akao	Momoko Hatano	Masayuki Nonaka	September 21, 2025
Preparing for the second washing of his vintage jeans, Morihito explains to his friends his appreciation for denim. Nico soon creates a doppleganger of Morihito to wear the jeans to help them fade faster, but it accidentally rips them. Unable to magically repair the jeans due to their high sentimental value to Morihito, Nico instead fixes a secondhand pair gifted by Miharu's father as replacement. Morihito is shocked to discover it is an even rarer and valuable version of his vintage jeans. An innocent question from Nico causes the boys to get into a debate over who is the best date planner, resulting in Morihito asking Nico out on a date. While excited at first, Nico quickly finds that Morihito has already pre-planned the entire date with a strict itinerary. Nico eventually assures Morihito that she appreciates his honesty and desire to share his interests. As such, Morihito apologizes. Later, the school begins preparing for the Asunaro Festival, and the festival planning committee approaches Nico to ask for her help with their closing ceremony, which she accepts. Meanwhile, someone claims magic will be used to commit a crime at the festival.
25	"Freshman Witch and Her Familiars"; Transliteration: "Kakedashi Majo to Tsukaima-tachi" (Japanese: 駆け出し魔女と使い魔たち)	Koso	Deko Akao	Hiroshi Ikehata	Kaishū Sugimura, Masayuki Nonaka, & Manamu Amazaki	October 5, 2025
Kara decides the class will host a haunted café, and Nico helps by casting a pair of spells. The festival committee once again asks Nico to help with the closing ceremony and she accepts. That night, Kanshi and Keigo become a comedy duo. They later decide not to go with the script Morihito gave to them. On the day of the festival, the café is a huge success. However, Kanshi and Keigo's comedy routine is a massive failure. Tenryu then informs Morihito of a note sent to the student council warning that magic will be used to commit a crime. Morihito considers telling Nico not to use magic, but his friends dissuade him. Morihito and his friends patrol the school during the second day, and pursue a mysterious suspect, but he is difficult to catch since he has had Nico's spells cast on him. Despite this, he nearly drowns until Morihito rescues him. The suspect is revealed to be Hajime from the festival committee, who was jealous his idea for the closing ceremony was passed over for Nico's. Morihito and his friends decide they will continue to watch over Nico and protect her.

== Cultural impact and reception ==
=== Popularity and sales ===
In June 2021, Witch Watch was nominated for the seventh Next Manga Award in the Best Printed Manga category and placed tenth out of 50 nominees. It was also nominated for the same award and placed second out of 50 nominees in 2022. By October 2025, the manga had over 4 million copies in circulation.

=== Critical response ===
Timothy Donohoo of Comic Book Resources compared Witch Watch to Kouji Miura's Blue Box and Shigure Tokita's Don't Blush, Sekime-san! due to both series having concepts and romantic aspects similar to Witch Watch's.

=== Accolades ===
Year	Award	Category	Recipient	Result	Ref.
2026	D Anime Store Awards	Laughter Anime	Witch Watch	Won	
2026	12th Anime Trending Awards	Anime of the Year	Witch Watch	Nominated	
2026	12th Anime Trending Awards	Boy of the Year	Morihito Otogi	Nominated	
2026	12th Anime Trending Awards	Girl of the Year	Nico Wakatsuki	Nominated	
2026	12th Anime Trending Awards	Couple or Ship of the Year	Morihito and Nico	Nominated	
2026	12th Anime Trending Awards	Supporting Boy of the Year	Kanshi Kazamatsuri	Nominated	
2026	12th Anime Trending Awards	Supporting Girl of the Year	Nemu Miyao	Nominated	
2026	12th Anime Trending Awards	Opening Theme Song of the Year	"Watch Me!" by Yoasobi	Nominated	
2026	12th Anime Trending Awards	Best in Voice Cast	Kōhei Amasaki, Kaito Ishikawa, Rina Kawaguchi, Tomori Kusunoki, Ryōta Suzuki, and Yuki Wakai	Nominated	
2026	12th Anime Trending Awards	Comedy Anime of the Year	Witch Watch	Nominated	
2026	12th Anime Trending Awards	Slice of Life Anime of the Year	Witch Watch	Nominated	
2026	12th Anime Trending Awards	Supernatural Anime of the Year	Witch Watch	Nominated	
2026	10th Crunchyroll Anime Awards	Best Comedy	Witch Watch	Nominated	
2026	10th Crunchyroll Anime Awards	Best Anime Song	"Watch Me!" by Yoasobi	Nominated	
2026	10th Crunchyroll Anime Awards	Best Opening Sequence	"Watch Me!" by Yoasobi	Nominated	
2026	10th Crunchyroll Anime Awards	Best Voice Artist Performance (French)	Catherine Hanotiau as Nico Wakatsuki	Nominated	
2026	10th Crunchyroll Anime Awards	Best Voice Artist Performance (German)	Patricia Strasburger as Nico Wakatsuki	Nominated	
2026	Japan Expo Awards	Daruma for Best Romance Anime	Witch Watch	Nominated	
2026	Japan Expo Awards	Daruma for Best Slice of Life Anime	Witch Watch	Nominated	
2026	Japan Expo Awards	Daruma for Best Opening	"Watch Me!" by Yoasobi	Nominated	
2026	21st AnimaniA Awards	Best Anime Song	"Watch Me!" by Yoasobi	Nominated	
