= Rina Kawaguchi =

Japanese voice actress and singer

- 川口 莉奈
- Born: 24 November
- Occupations: Voice actress; singer
- Years active: 2019–present
- Employer: Aoni Production
- Notable work: The Idolmaster Shiny Colors as Luca Ikaruga; Kizuna no Allele as Quan; Dark Gathering as Ai Kamiyo; Witch Watch as Nico Wakatsuki; Himitsu no AiPri as Elle Rokudo
- Height: 144 cm (4 ft 9 in)

Rina Kawaguchi (Japanese: 川口 莉奈, Hepburn: Kawaguchi Rina; born 24 November) is a Japanese voice actress from Saitama Prefecture, affiliated with Aoni Production. She is known for starring as Luca Ikaruga in The Idolmaster Shiny Colors, Quan in Kizuna no Allele, Ai Kamiyo in Dark Gathering, Nico Wakatsuki in Witch Watch and Elle Rokudō in Himitsu no AiPri.

== Biography ==
Rina Kawaguchi, a native of Saitama Prefecture, was born on 24 November. During her early career, she voiced characters in Rifle Is Beautiful, Chibi Maruko-chan, GeGeGe no Kitarō, One Piece, Digimon Ghost Game, and Sailor Moon Eternal.

She voiced Reginleif in Record of Ragnarok and Celty Srowa in Is It Wrong to Try to Pick Up Girls in a Dungeon?. In 2023, she starred as Quan in Kizuna no Allele and as Ai Kamiyo in Dark Gathering; she also performed both opening theme songs of the former as part of the tie-in unit PathTLive. In August 2024, it was announced that she would star as Nico Wakatsuki, the main protagonist of Witch Watch.

In July 2023, it was announced that she would voice Luca Ikaruga, one of the three members of the unit Cometik, in The Idolmaster Shiny Colors, a spinoff of The Idolmaster franchise. After unsuccessfully auditioning for the Shiny Colors unit Noctchill, she successfully auditioned to play Luca. She recalled sounding differently from her normal self for her audition, as well as wearing platform shoes to compensate for the height difference between her and her character.

She was already a fan of The Idolmaster Cinderella Girls: Starlight Stage by the time she joined Shiny Colors, and she considers Eve Santaclaus and Ranko Kanzaki among her favorite idols in the game.

K-pop is one of Kawaguchi's favorite genres.

== Filmography ==
=== Animated television ===
Year	Title	Role	Ref.
2019	Rifle Is Beautiful	Student	
2020	Chibi Maruko-chan	Typhoon sister	
2020	Future's Folktales	Servant	
2020	GeGeGe no Kitarō	Female college student C	
2020	One Piece	Boy	
2020	The Genie Family 2020	Staff	
2021	Digimon Ghost Game	Moe, high school girl, Potamon, Nico, girls	
2021	Record of Ragnarok	Reginleif	
2022	RPG Real Estate	Child	
2022	Shinobi no Ittoki	Female student	
2022	Sylvanian Families	Sky, etc.	
2022	The Makanai: Cooking for the Maiko House	Maiko A	
2023	Dark Gathering	Ai Kamiyo	
2023	Kizuna no Allele	Quan	
2023	Is It Wrong to Try to Pick Up Girls in a Dungeon?	Celty Srowa	
2023	My Love Story with Yamada-kun at Lv999	Tousei High School students	
2025	Witch Watch	Nico Wakatsuki	
2025	Himitsu no AiPri: Ring-hen	Elle Rokudō	
2026	Playing Death Games to Put Food on the Table	Momono	
2026	Needy Girl Overdose	Purple Lollipop	
2026	From Overshadowed to Overpowered	Maria	
2027	Giant Ojō-sama	Stella	
2027	Shōzen	Shōzen	
2027	7-nin no Nemuri Hime	Elisa	
2027	Noa-senpai wa Tomodachi	Noa Saotome	

=== Animated film ===
Year	Title	Role	Ref.
2021	Sailor Moon Eternal	Women	

=== Original net animation ===
Year	Title	Role	Ref.
2022	Shenmue: The Animation	Izumi Takano	
2022	Tales of Luminaria: The Fateful Crossroad	Refugee child	

=== Video games ===
Year	Title	Role	Ref.
2019	Robot Girls Z Online	Gallery director	
2020	Monster Strike	Mako Otoshida	
2021	Kemono Friends 3	Tategoto Azarashi	
2021	Touhou Danmaku Kagura	Merlin Prismriver	
2021	The Idolmaster Shiny Colors	Luca Ikaruga	
2021	Utawarerumono: Lost Flag	Crew	
2022	Goddess of Victory: Nikke	Quiry	
2024	Reynatis	Moa Fukamachi	
