= Giant Ojō-sama =

Japanese manga series

- First tankōbon volume cover, featuring Oriko Fujido

ジャイアントお嬢様 (Jaianto Ojō-sama)
- Genre: Comedy
- Manga
- Written by: Nikumura Q
- Published by: Shogakukan
- Imprint: Shōnen Sunday Comics Special
- Magazine: Sunday Webry
- Original run: July 30, 2021 – present
- Volumes: 13
- Anime television series
- Directed by: Hiroshi Ikehata
- Written by: Yū Satō
- Music by: Yūsuke Shirato; Kijibato; Aira
- Studio: Tatsunoko Production
- Licensed by: Sentai Filmworks
- Original run: January 2027 – scheduled
- icon

Giant Ojō-sama (Japanese: ジャイアントお嬢様, Hepburn: Jaianto Ojō-sama; 'Giant Young Lady') is a Japanese comedy manga series written and illustrated by Nikumura Q. It began serialization on Shogakukan's Sunday Webry manga website in July 2021. An anime television series adaptation produced by Tatsunoko Production is set to premiere in January 2027.

== Plot ==
Oriko Fujido is an heiress of the wealthy Fujido Zaibatsu conglomerate, whom was given ownership of a town for her fourth birthday. Several years later, a kaiju attacked the town. Her butler, Dr. Sebastian, gives her an experimental energy drink which turns her into a giantess to fight against it. She then declares that she will always defend the town as its giant protector. During the manga, it is stated that she does unintentionally cause damage to the town while doing so.

== Characters ==
Oriko Fujido (富士動 機子, Fujidō Oriko)
Voiced by: Yū Serizawa
Dr. Sebastian (Dr.セバスチャン, Dr. Sebasuchan)
Voiced by: Junya Enoki
Madoka Ito (伊東マドカ, Ito Madoka)
Voiced by: Risa Imayanagi
Stella (ステラ, Sutera)
Voiced by: Rina Kawaguchi

== Media ==
=== Manga ===
Written and illustrated by Nikumura Q, Giant Ojō-sama was originally a web comic published on Shueisha's Jump Rookie manga website on December 17, 2020. It later began serialization on Shogakukan's Sunday Webry manga website on July 30, 2021. The first volume was later released on November 12. Its chapters have been collected into thirteen tankōbon volumes as of September 2026.

| No. | Release date | ISBN |
|---|---|---|
| 1 | November 12, 2021 | 978-4-09-850807-5 |
| 2 | February 10, 2022 | 978-4-09-850899-0 |
| 3 | July 12, 2022 | 978-4-09-851219-5 |
| 4 | October 12, 2022 | 978-4-09-851367-3 |
| 5 | December 12, 2022 | 978-4-09-851487-8 |
| 6 | April 12, 2023 | 978-4-09-852018-3 |
| 7 | July 12, 2023 | 978-4-09-852542-3 |
| 8 | November 10, 2023 | 978-4-09-853006-9 |
| 9 | April 10, 2024 | 978-4-09-853109-7 |
| 10 | March 12, 2025 | 978-4-09-854003-7 |
| 11 | November 12, 2025 | 978-4-09-854362-5 |
| 12 | August 10, 2026 | 978-4-09-854776-0 |
| 13 | September 11, 2026 | 978-4-09-854818-7 |

=== Anime ===
An anime television series adaptation was announced on March 3, 2025. The series will be produced by Tatsunoko Production and directed by Hiroshi Ikehata, with Katsuya Ōshima serving as assistant director, Yū Satō handling the series composition and scripts, Hajime Mitsuda designing the characters and serving as chief animation director, and Yūsuke Shirato, Kijibato, and Aira of Dream Monster composing the music. It is set to premiere in January 2027. Sentai Filmworks licensed the series and it will simulcast on Hidive.

== Reception ==
The series was nominated for the eighth Next Manga Awards in 2022. The series was ranked 5th in AnimeJapan's 6th "Most Wanted Anime Adaptation" poll in 2023.
