= Dark Gathering =

Japanese manga series

- First tankōbon volume cover, featuring Yayoi Hozuki

ダークギャザリング (Dāku Gyazaringu)
- Genre: Adventure; Horror; Supernatural
- Manga
- Written by: Kenichi Kondo
- Published by: Shueisha
- English publisher: NA: Viz Media
- Imprint: Jump Comics SQ.
- Magazine: Jump Square
- Original run: March 4, 2019 – present
- Volumes: 20
- Anime television series
- Directed by: Hiroshi Ikehata
- Written by: Shigeru Murakoshi
- Music by: Kohta Yamamoto; Shun Narita; Yūsuke Seo
- Studio: OLM Team Masuda
- Licensed by: Sentai Filmworks: SA / SEA: Muse Communication
- Original network: Tokyo MX, BS Asahi, Kansai TV
- Original run: July 10, 2023 – present
- Episodes: 25
- icon

Dark Gathering (Japanese: ダークギャザリング, Hepburn: Dāku Gyazaringu) is a Japanese manga series written and illustrated by Kenichi Kondo. It has been serialized in Shueisha's shōnen manga magazine Jump Square since March 2019. An anime television series adaptation by OLM aired from July to December 2023. A second season is set to premiere in 2027.

By September 2026, Dark Gathering had over 3 million copies in circulation.

== Plot ==
Following a terrifying spiritual encounter, Keitaro Gentoga became a shut-in. With the help of his childhood friend Eiko Hozuki, he decides to rejoin society by attending college and working as a private tutor. His first student is Yayoi Hozuki, Eiko's cousin, an intelligent elementary schooler who is obsessed with the occult. She is hunting down and capturing dangerous ghosts in order to find the perpetrator who abducted her mother.

== Characters ==
Keitaro Gentoga (幻燈河 螢多朗, Gentōga Keitarō)
Voiced by: Nobunaga Shimazaki (Japanese); Clint Bickham (English)
A young man with a cursed right hand and a natural predisposition to attract ghosts to himself. As a young boy, Keitaro experienced a spiritual encounter that resulted in both him and his friend Eiko Hozuki being cursed by an unknown spirit, resulting in nerve endings growing from their hands. This traumatic event resulted in him becoming a shut-in until he was rehabilitated by Eiko. As a way to resocialize himself, he took upon Eiko's suggestion and was introduced to Yayoi as her private tutor. At present, the curse is being suppressed with the help of his grandmother, who is a shrine priestess. Eiko personally believes that although Keitaro is terrified by the supernatural, he is also enamoured by the dread that it brings. He has a mutual affection for Eiko, which he has expressed on multiple occasions.
Yayoi Hozuki (寶月 夜宵, Hōzuki Yayoi)
Voiced by: Yū Sasahara (Japanese); Natalie Rial (English)
Keitaro's first student. She was initially a normal child, but had developed polycoria in both eyes for some unknown reason. Originally, she only saw ghosts as hazy figures. However, after an accident that left her an orphan, she was able to see ghosts clearly. During the accident, she witnessed her mother's ghost being abducted by an embryo of ghostly origins and has made it her goal to get her mother back by capturing ghosts to defeat the perpetrator. Post accident, her IQ was evaluated to be greater than 160 and her intelligence has saved herself, Keitaro, and her cousin Eiko more than once in their search for the embryo ghost.
Eiko Hozuki (寶月 詠子, Hōzuki Eiko)
Voiced by: Kana Hanazawa (Japanese); Karlii Hoch (English)
Eiko is the childhood friend of Keitaro who possesses a curse on her left hand as a result of being caught up in the same ordeal as Keitaro. Being in love with Keitaro since a young age to the point of a dark twisted obsession, she is immensely over-protective—wiretapping, placing hidden cameras and GPS tracking devices to stalk and monitor his vitals without his knowledge. Although Eiko has a strong foundation in computer science from her wiretapping and excellent grades at school, she opts to study folklore so that she can better understand Keitaro's struggles with the occult. She does not have a spiritual sense like Yayoi or Keitaro.
Ai Kamiyo (神代 愛依, Kamiyo Ai)
Voiced by: Rina Kawaguchi (Japanese); Alyssa Marek (English)
Keitaro's second student. An energetic girl with star-patterned pupils as a sign that she had been marked by a god as his bride. Due to the god's energy leaking out from the star-shaped seals in her eyes, wandering ghosts are attracted to Ai. At first, Ai appears to be a clumsy girl whose misfortune always ends up involving people around her, including her brother who died as a result of pushing her away from falling steel pylons. However, it is later revealed that this was due to the malevolent god deflecting all of Ai's misfortunes to people surrounding her to prevent his bride from being harmed. Ai is destined to die and become the god's bride on her 20th birthday.

== Media ==
=== Manga ===
Written and illustrated by Kenichi Kondo, Dark Gathering has been serialized in Shueisha's shōnen manga magazine Jump Square since March 4, 2019. On December 4, 2024, it was announced that the manga would enter a four-month hiatus to conduct research and prepare for a new story arc; it resumed on April 4, 2025. Shueisha has collected its chapters into individual tankōbon volumes. The first volume was released on June 4, 2019. As of July 3, 2026, 20 volumes have been released.

At New York Comic Con 2022, Viz Media announced that they licensed the series for English publication.

==== Volumes ====
No.	Original release date	Original ISBN	English release date	English ISBN
1	June 4, 2019	978-4-08-881856-6	May 16, 2023	978-1-9747-3894-6
1. "Yayoi Hozuki" (寶月 夜宵, Hōzuki Yayoi); 2. "Keitaro Gentoga" (幻燈河 螢多朗, Gentōga Keitarō); 3. "Together" (ふたり, Futari)
2	October 4, 2019	978-4-08-882089-7	July 18, 2023	978-1-9747-3903-5
4. "Eiko Hozuki" (寶月 詠子, Hōzuki Eiko); 5. "Welcome Party" (新入生歓迎会, Shinnyūsei Kangei-kai); 6. "Promise" (約束, Yakusoku); 7. "Spellbound" (呪縛, Jubaku)
3	February 4, 2020	978-4-08-882214-3	September 19, 2023	978-1-9747-4039-0
8. "S Tunnel" (Sトンネル, Esu Tonneru); 9. "Ai Kamiyo" (神代 愛依, Kamiyo Ai); 10. "A God's Bride" (神の花嫁, Kami no Hanayome); 11. "Blasphemy" (瀆神, Tokushin)
4	June 4, 2020	978-4-08-882323-2	November 21, 2023	978-1-9747-4077-2
12. "All Across Japan" (日本全土, Nihon Zendo); 13. "H Castle Ruins ① Danger Rank: S" (H城址① 危険度「S」, Eichi Jōshi 1: Kiken-do "Esu"); 14. "H Castle Ruins ② The Graduate" (H城址② 卒業生, Eichi Jōshi 2: Sotsugyōsei); 15. "H Castle Ruins ③ Fetish" (H城址③ 呪物, Eichi Jōshi 3: Jubutsu)
5	October 2, 2020	978-4-08-882441-3	January 16, 2024	978-1-9747-4284-4
16. "Retrieval" (出獄, Shutsugoku); 17. "The Old F Tunnel" (旧Fトンネル, Kyū Efu Tonneru); 18. "The Old Old F Tunnel" (旧旧Fトンネル, Kyū Kyū Efu Tonneru); 19. "Wailings of the Restless Dead" (鬼哭, Kikoku)
6	February 4, 2021	978-4-08-882559-5	March 19, 2024	978-1-9747-4317-9
20. "Property" (物件, Bukken); 21. "House of Annunciation" (受胎告知の家, Jutai Kokuchi no Ie); 22. "Closing the Deal" (成約, Seiyaku); 23. "Dawn" (彼者誰(かはたれ)時, Kawatare-doki)
7	June 4, 2021	978-4-08-882677-6	May 21, 2024	978-1-9747-4556-2
24. "Brothel Visit" (登楼, Tōrō); 25. "Bonds" (縁, Enishi); 26. "Old I Water Gate ① Pure Hatred" (旧I水門① 無垢の怨念, Kyū Ai Suimon 1: Muku no Onnen); 27. "Old I Water Gate ② Childish Ignorance" (旧I水門② 童蒙, Kyū Ai Suimon 2: Dōmō)
8	November 4, 2021	978-4-08-882830-5	July 16, 2024	978-1-9747-4602-6
28. "Old I Water Gate ③ Drop-Dead Gorgeous" (旧I水門③ 瑰麗, Kyū Ai Suimon 3: Kairei); 29. "Old I Water Gate ④ Brothel in Flames" (旧I水門④ 炎の廓, Kyū Ai Suimon 4: Honō no Kuruwa); 30. "Wriggling Shadow" (蠢く影, Ugomeku Kage); 31. "School Ghost Story ① Tag" (学校の怪談① 鬼ごっこ, Gakkō no Kaidan 1 Onigokko)
9	March 4, 2022	978-4-08-883054-4	September 3, 2024	978-1-9747-4875-4
32. "School Ghost Story ② Nightmare" (学校の怪談② 悪夢, Gakkō no Kaidan 2: Akumu); 33. "Calamitous Star" (凶ツ星, Magatsuboshi); 34. "March on Kyoto" (上洛, Jōraku); 35. "The A Dam ① Writhing" (Aダム① 蠕動, Ē Damu 1: Zendō)
10	August 4, 2022	978-4-08-883205-0	November 5, 2024	978-1-9747-4922-5
36. "The A Dam ② Toad Basin" (Aダム② 蟇盆, Ē Damu 2: Taibon); 37. "The A Dam ③ Collapse" (Aダム③ 崩壊, 5 Damu 3: Hōkai); 38. "Connection" (因, Yosuga); 39. "Wearing Red" (赤い服, Akai Fuku)
11	December 2, 2022	978-4-08-883295-1	January 7, 2025	978-1-9747-5148-8
40. "Kubizuka Daimyojin Shrine" (首塚大明神, Kubizuka Daimyōjin); 41. "Seimei Shrine" (晴明神社, Seimei Jinja); 42. "F Park ① Siren" (F公園① サイレン, Efu Kōen 1: Sairen); 43. "F Park ② Moon Soul" (F公園② 月魂, Efu Kōen 2: Tsukishiro)
12	April 4, 2023	978-4-08-883456-6	March 4, 2025	978-1-9747-5216-4
44. "F Park ③ Memories" (F公園③ 追憶, Efu Kōen 3: Tsuioku); 45. "Occult Item Dealer" (呪物屋, Jubutsu-ya); 46. "Route 1 ① Animal Realm" (国道一号線① 畜生道, Kokudō Ichigōzen 1: Chikushōdō); 47. "Route 1 ② Hell Realm" (国道一号線② 地獄道, Kokudō Ichigōzen 2: Jigokudō)
13	August 4, 2023	978-4-08-883534-1	May 6, 2025	978-1-9747-5487-8
48. "Route 1 ③ Asura Realm" (国道一号線③ 修羅道, Kokudō Ichigōzen 3: Shuradō); 49. "Route 1 ④ Heavenly Realm" (国道一号線④ 天道, Kokudō Ichigōzen 4: Tendō); 50. "Route 1 ⑤ Human Realm" (国道一号線⑤ 人間道, Kokudō Ichigōzen 5 Ningendō); 51. "Kyoto Conquered" (古都制圧, Koto Seiatsu); Bonus Chapter "Special One-Shot" (特別読切, Tokubetsu Yomikiri)
14	December 4, 2023	978-4-08-883720-8	July 1, 2025	978-1-9747-5533-2
52. "Eve of the Showdown" (決戦前夜, Kessen Zen'ya); 53. "Bellflower Regicide" (弑逆桔梗, Shigyaku Kikyō); 54. "Divine Wrath vs. the Prayer Blade" (「神の祟り」VS「祈りの刃」, "Kami no Tatari" VS "Inori no Yaiba"); 55. "Possession" (憑依, Hyōi)
15	May 2, 2024	978-4-08-883891-5	September 2, 2025	978-1-9747-5833-3
56. "Rain" (雨, Ame); 57. "Gathering" (結集, Kesshū); 58. "Falling Like Flowers/Profusion" (散華/繚乱, Sange/Ryōran); 59. "Assembly" (淵叢, Ensō)
16	September 4, 2024	978-4-08-884180-9	November 4, 2025	978-1-9747-5885-2
60. "Divine Might" (神威, Kamui); 61. "Rupture" (潰裂, Kairetsu); 62. "Last Words" (終の言の葉, Tsui no Kotonoha); 63. "Taboo Memories" (諱-憶, Ki-Oku)
17	January 4, 2025	978-4-08-884333-9	January 6, 2026	978-1-9747-6125-8
64. "Regicide" (弑逆, Shīgyaku); 65. "The End of an Ancient Promise" (旧約の終焉, Kyūyaku no Shūen); 66. "Accomplishment" (完遂, Kansui); 67. "Triumphant Return" (凱旋, Gaisen)
18	August 4, 2025	978-4-08-884619-4	June 2, 2026	978-1-9747-1666-1
68. "Zero / First Battle" (零(ゼロ)/初陣, Zero/Uijin); 69. "Zero / The Next Generation" (零(ゼロ)/次世代, Zero/Jisedai); 70. "Zero / Appearance of a Dragon in Flight" (零(ゼロ)/䨺龘, Zero/Taitō); 71. "The Case of the Abduction, Confinement, and Murder of Yin Jiao by 'Girl A'" (太歳星君拉致監禁・殺傷事件 実行犯『少女A』, Taisai Seikun Rachi Kankin Sasshō Jiken: Jikkōhan "Shōjo Ē")
19	February 4, 2026	978-4-08-884853-2	—	—
72. Kōsa (交差); 73. Eki (駅); 74. Kumotsu (供物); 75. Arahitogami (現人神); 76. Kyokuchibito (極致人)
20	July 3, 2026	978-4-08-885120-4	—	—
77. Shihō Torihiki (司法取引); 78. Kiniki (禁域); 79. Ketsui (決意); 80. Shutsujin (出陣); 81. Dī Dōato 1 Tamashii no za (D堂跡①魂の座)

=== Anime ===
In July 2022, it was announced that the series would receive an anime television series adaptation. It was produced by OLM and directed by Hiroshi Ikehata, with scripts written by Shigeru Murakoshi, and music composed by Kohta Yamamoto, Shun Narita, and Yūsuke Seo. The two-consecutive cours series aired from July 10 to December 25, 2023, on Tokyo MX and other networks. (Note: Tokyo MX listed the series premiere on July 9, 2023, at 25:05, which is effectively July 10 at 1:05 a.m. JST.) The opening theme song is "Kakuriyo" (幽世; 'Afterlife'), performed by Luz, and the ending theme songs are "Haiiro" (灰色; 'Gray') for the first cours, and "Intaglio" (インタリオ, Intario) for the second cours, both performed by Kana Hanazawa.

Sentai Filmworks licensed the series, and produced an English dub, which premiered on December 10, 2023. Muse Communication licensed the series in Asia-Pacific.

In October 2025, a second season was announced to be in production, with the main staff and cast returning to reprise their roles. It is set to premiere in 2027.

==== Episodes ====
No.	Title	Directed by (Note: Information is taken from the ending credits of each episode.)	Written by	Storyboarded by	Original release date
1	"Yayoi Hozuki"; Transliteration: "Hōzuki Yayoi" (Japanese: 寶月夜宵)	Moto Terada	Shigeru Murakoshi	Hiroshi Ikehata & Dai Fukuyama	July 10, 2023
2	"Keitaro Gentoga"; Transliteration: "Gentōga Keitarō" (Japanese: 幻燈河螢多朗)	Yoshitaka Nagaoka	Shigeru Murakoshi	Wataru Nakagawa	July 17, 2023
3	"Friends"; Transliteration: "Futari" (Japanese: ふたり)	Hideki Takeda	Kenichi Yamashita	Masatoshi Hakata	July 24, 2023
4	"Eiko Hozuki"; Transliteration: "Hōzuki Eiko" (Japanese: 寶月詠子)	Takashi Kobayashi	Kazuho Hyōdō	Hiroyuki Fukushima	July 31, 2023
5	"The Freshmen Welcome Event"; Transliteration: "Shinnyūsei Kangeikai" (Japanese: 新入生歓迎会)	Takuya Wada	Kazuho Hyōdō	Hiromasa Amano	August 7, 2023
6	"The Promise"; Transliteration: "Yakusoku" (Japanese: 約束)	Yoshitaka Nagaoka	Shigeru Murakoshi	Hiroshi Ikehata	August 14, 2023
7	"S Tunnel"; Transliteration: "S Tonneru" (Japanese: Sトンネル)	Masashi Tsukino	Shigeru Murakoshi	Makoto Nakata	August 21, 2023
8	"Betrothed to Divinity"; Transliteration: "Kami no Hanayome" (Japanese: 神の花嫁)	Kazuho Kunimoto	Kenichi Yamashita	Hiroshi Ikehata	August 28, 2023
9	"Blasphemy"; Transliteration: "Tokushin" (Japanese: 瀆神)	Keisuke Warita	Yū Satō	Makoto Nakata	September 4, 2023
10	"Across Japan"; Transliteration: "Nihon Zendo" (Japanese: 日本全土)	Kiyotaka Kanchiku	Shigeru Murakoshi	Yoshitaka Makino	September 11, 2023
11	"S-Rank Danger: Castle H Ruins"; Transliteration: "H Jōshi Kiken-do S" (Japanese: H城址-危険度S)	Yasuo Ejima	Shigeru Murakoshi	Akira Nishimori	September 18, 2023
12	"The Castle H Ruins, Danger Rank S!"; Transliteration: "H Jōshi Sotsugyōsei" (Japanese: H城址-卒業生)	Hideki Takeda	Shigeru Murakoshi	Akira Nishimori	September 25, 2023
13	"Emancipate"; Transliteration: "Shutsugoku" (Japanese: 出獄)	Mitsuo Hashimoto	Kazuho Hyōdō	Tetsuya Kawaishi	October 2, 2023
14	"Old F Tunnel"; Transliteration: "Kyū F Tonneru" (Japanese: 旧Fトンネル)	Masato Uchibori	Kenichi Yamashita	Yoshitaka Makino	October 9, 2023
15	"Old Old F Tunnel"; Transliteration: "Kyū Kyū F Tonneru" (Japanese: 旧旧Fトンネル)	Yoshitaka Nagaoka	Yū Satō	Masatoshi Hakata	October 16, 2023
16	"House Hunting"; Transliteration: "Bukken" (Japanese: 物件)	Masashi Tsukino	Shigeru Murakoshi	Hiroshi Ikehata	October 23, 2023
17	"The House of the Virgin Conception"; Transliteration: "Jutai Kokuchi no Ie" (Japanese: 受胎告知の家)	Shigeki Awai & Mao Yingxing	Kazuho Hyōdō	Akira Tsuchiya	October 30, 2023
18	"Morning Twilight"; Transliteration: "Asa no Tasogare" (Japanese: 朝の黄昏)	Yū Yabuuchi	Kenichi Yamashita	Tetsuya Kawaishi	November 6, 2023
19	"Within the Brothel"; Transliteration: "Tōrō" (Japanese: 登楼)	Yoshikazu Ueki	Yū Satō	Yoshitaka Makino	November 13, 2023
20	"The Old I Watergate: An Innocent Grudge"; Transliteration: "Kyū I Suimon / Muku no Onnen" (Japanese: 旧I水門/無垢の怨念)	Fumio Maezono	Shigeru Murakoshi	Meigo Naito	November 20, 2023
21	"The Old I Watergate: Resplendence"; Transliteration: "Kyū I Suimon / Kairei" (Japanese: 旧I水門/瑰麗)	Kentarō Fujita	Kazuho Hyōdō	Yoshitaka Makino	November 27, 2023
22	"The Old I Watergate: Pleasure District in Flames"; Transliteration: "Kyū I Suimon / Honō no Kuruwa" (Japanese: 旧I水門/炎の廓)	Michita Shiroishi	Kenichi Yamashita	Hiroshi Ikehata & Yasuo Ejima	December 4, 2023
23	"Scary School Stories: Hide and Seek"; Transliteration: "Gakkō no Kaidan / Onigokko" (Japanese: 学校の怪談/鬼ごっこ)	Masashi Tsukino	Yū Satō	Tetsuya Kawaishi	December 11, 2023
24	"Scary School Stories: Nightmare"; Transliteration: "Gakkō no Kaidan / Akumu" (Japanese: 学校の怪談/悪夢)	Keisuke Nishijima	Shigeru Murakoshi	Masatoshi Hakata	December 18, 2023
25	"Dark Gathering"; Transliteration: "Yami ni Tsudō" (Japanese: 闇に集う)	Yoshikazu Ueki	Shigeru Murakoshi	Hiroshi Ikehata	December 25, 2023

== Reception ==
By September 2026, the manga had over 3 million copies in circulation. In 2020, the manga was one of the 50 nominees for the sixth Next Manga Awards in the print category.
