= Noa-senpai wa Tomodachi =

Japanese manga series

- First tankōbon volume cover

のあ先輩はともだち。
- Genre: Comedy
- Manga
- Written by: Enma Akiyama
- Published by: Shueisha
- Imprint: Young Jump Comics
- Magazine: Weekly Young Jump
- Original run: July 6, 2023 – present
- Volumes: 12
- Anime television series
- Directed by: Shinsuke Yanagi
- Written by: Keiichirō Ōchi
- Studio: Feel
- Original run: 2027 – scheduled
- icon

Noa-senpai wa Tomodachi (のあ先輩はともだち。; 'Noa Is My Senior, and My Friend') is a Japanese manga series written and illustrated by Enma Akiyama. It began serialization in Shueisha's seinen manga magazine Weekly Young Jump in July 2023. An anime television series adaptation produced by Feel is set to premiere in 2027.

== Synopsis ==
Rihito Ōtsuka, a young salaryman in his second year on the job, discovers a secret side to his senior colleague, the highly professional and career-driven Noa Saotome, as he is leaving the office after working late. Drinking sake and loudly weeping over a recent breakup, the emotionally volatile Noa reveals a persona starkly different from her cool workplace exterior. Her sense of personal boundaries is flawed, and her ex-boyfriends have run away from her every time in the past. Rihito, in contrast, is a young man of the Satori generation (a term for young adults who are detached from ambition and consumerism) who has come to believe that "saving energy is enough for life." Rihito is completely occupied with work and hobbies and has little interest in finding a romantic partner. For this reason, he respects Noa, who takes both her work and love life seriously. These two characters—who normally would never cross paths—suddenly become friends.

== Characters ==
Noa Saotome (早乙女望愛, Saotome Noa)
Voiced by: Mayu Yoshioka (PV), Machico (YouTube vomic), Ai Kakuma (TikTok vomic), Rina Kawaguchi (anime)
Rihito Ōtsuka (大塚理人, Ōtsuka Rihito)
Voiced by: Kengo Kawanishi (PV), Haruki Ishiya (YouTube vomic), Fumiya Imai (TikTok vomic), Tomoya Itō (anime)

== Media ==
=== Manga ===
Written and illustrated by Enma Akiyama, Noa-senpai wa Tomodachi began serialization in Shueisha's seinen manga magazine Weekly Young Jump on July 6, 2023. Its chapters have been compiled into twelve tankōbon volumes as of October 2026.

No.	Release date	ISBN
1	October 19, 2023	978-4-08-892862-3
2	February 19, 2024	978-4-08-893114-2
3	June 19, 2024	978-4-08-893265-1
4	September 19, 2024	978-4-08-893375-7
5	January 17, 2025	978-4-08-893481-5
6	April 17, 2025	978-4-08-893619-2
7	July 17, 2025	978-4-08-893740-3
8	October 17, 2025	978-4-08-893836-3
9	January 19, 2026	978-4-08-894061-8
10	April 17, 2026	978-4-08-894163-9
11	July 17, 2026	978-4-08-894273-5
12	October 19, 2026	978-4-08-894368-8

=== Anime ===
An anime television series adaptation was announced on July 13, 2026. It will be produced by Feel and directed by Shinsuke Yanagi, with series composition handled by Keiichirō Ōchi and characters designed by Yumiko Yamamoto. The series is set to premiere in 2027.

=== Other ===
A promotional video commemorating the release of the series' first volume was released on the Weekly Young Jump YouTube channel on October 19, 2023. It featured the voices of Mayu Yoshioka and Kengo Kawanishi.

== Reception ==
The series was nominated for the 10th Next Manga Awards in the print category and was ranked eighth.
