= Shang Shan =

Chinese webcomic

尚善
- Genre: Historical fantasy
- Author: Jiang Jia Meizi
- Illustrator: Jiang Jia Meizi
- Publisher: Bilibili Manhua
- Other publishers: Micro Magazine (Japanese)
- Magazine: Bilibili Manhua
- Original run: March 2022 – present
- Anime television series

Shōzen
- Directed by: Itsuro Kawasaki
- Written by: Itsuro Kawasaki
- Music by: Takurō Iga
- Studio: Dangun Pictures; Cannon Code
- Original network: Fuji TV (B8station)
- Original run: April 2027 – scheduled

Shang Shan (Chinese: 尚善) is a Chinese historical fantasy manhua written and illustrated by Jiang Jia Meizi. It has been serialized via Bilibili Manhua platform since March 2022. It is also serialized in Japanese by Micro Magazine on their RaiComi website since August 2026. An anime television series adaptation produced by Dangun Pictures and Cannon Code titled Shōzen is set to premiere in April 2027.

== Characters ==
Shàng Shàn / Shōzen
Voiced by: Rina Kawaguchi
Dào Rán / Dōzen
Voiced by: Hiroshi Kamiya
Lǚ Rén / Ryojin
Voiced by: Daisuke Sakuma (Snow Man)
Qián Qīng / Kensei
Voiced by: Aoi Yūki
Chí Lù / Chiro
Voiced by: Ayumu Murase
Ko Kuka
Voiced by: Kana Hanazawa

== Media ==
=== Anime ===
An anime television series adaptation was announced on March 17, 2026. Titled Shōzen, the series is produced by Dangun Pictures and Cannon Code and directed and written by Itsuro Kawasaki, with Tomohiro Matsukawa serving as assistant director, Eri Osada designing the characters, and Takurō Iga composing the music. It is set to premiere in April 2027 on Fuji TV's B8station programming block.
