= K. Megan McArthur =

American oceanographer and NASA astronaut (born 1971)

Megan McArthur
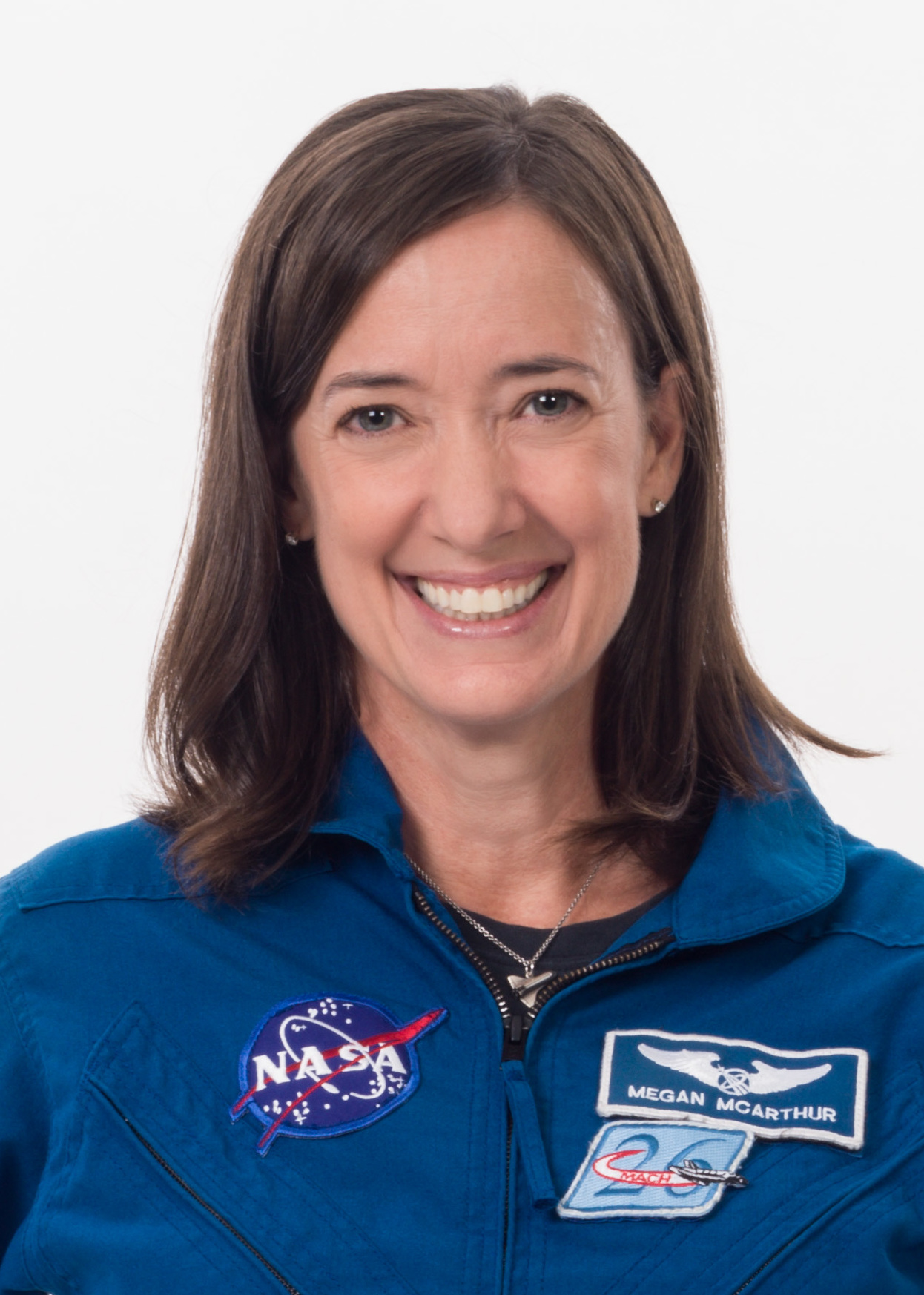
- McArthur in 2020
- Born: Katherine Megan McArthur; August 30, 1971 (age 55); Honolulu, Hawaii, U.S.
- Education: University of California, Los Angeles (BS); University of California, San Diego (MS, PhD)
- Spouse: Bob Behnken
- Children: 1
- Space career

NASA astronaut
- Time in space: 212 days, 15 hours, 21 minutes
- Selection: NASA Group 18 (2000)
- Missions: STS-125; SpaceX Crew-2 (Expedition 65/66)
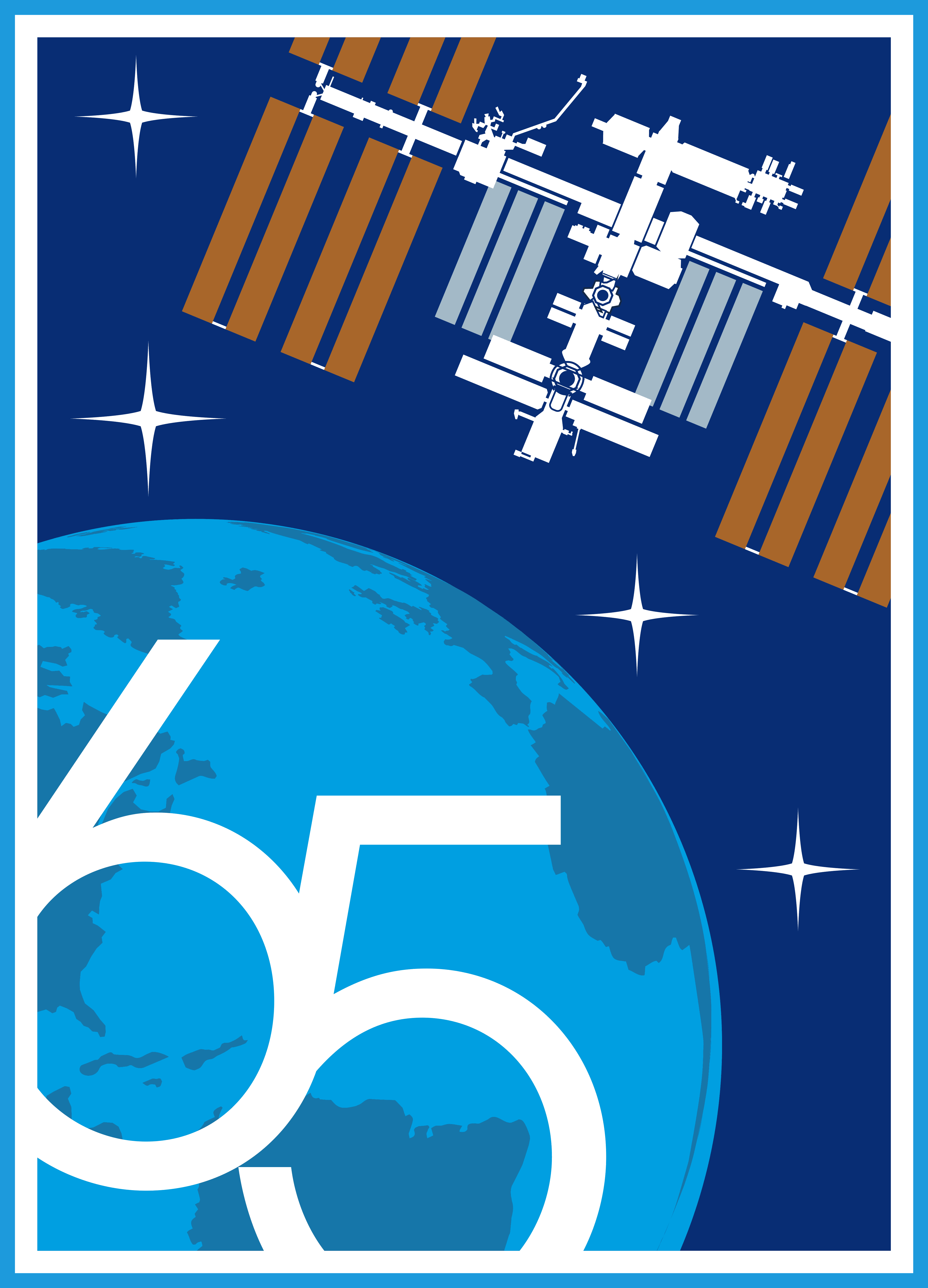
- Mission insignia
- Retired: August 29, 2025

Katherine Megan McArthur (born August 30, 1971) is an American oceanographer, engineer, and former NASA astronaut. She has served as a Capsule Communicator (CAPCOM) for both the Space Shuttle and International Space Station (ISS). Megan McArthur has flown one Space Shuttle mission, STS-125, and one SpaceX mission, SpaceX Crew-2 on Crew Dragon Endeavour. She is known as the last person to be hands on with the Hubble Space Telescope via the Canadarm. McArthur has served in a number of positions including working in the Shuttle Avionics Laboratory (SAIL). She is married to fellow astronaut Bob Behnken.

== Early life and education ==
McArthur was born in Honolulu, Hawaii, but grew up in California. She attended London Central High School and graduated from St. Francis High School in Mountain View, California, then later earned a Bachelor of Science degree in aerospace engineering from the University of California, Los Angeles in 1993. In 2002, she was awarded a Ph.D. in oceanography from the Scripps Institution of Oceanography at the University of California, San Diego.

== Oceanography career ==
At the Scripps Institution of Oceanography, McArthur conducted graduate research in nearshore underwater acoustic propagation and digital signal processing. Her research focused on determining geoacoustic models to describe very shallow water waveguides using measured transmission loss data in a genetic algorithm inversion technique. She served as chief scientist during at-sea data collection operations and has planned and led diving operations during sea-floor instrument deployments and sediment-sample collections. While at Scripps, she participated in a range of in-water instrument testing, deployment, maintenance, and recovery, and collection of marine plants, animals, and sediment. During this time, McArthur also volunteered at Birch Aquarium, conducting educational demonstrations for the public from inside a 70,000-gallon (265 m³) exhibit tank of the California Kelp Forest.

== NASA career ==
Selected as a mission specialist by NASA in July 2000, McArthur reported for training in August 2000. She trained at the Sonny Carter Training Facility. Following the completion of two years of training and evaluation, she was assigned to the Astronaut Office Shuttle Operations Branch working technical issues on shuttle systems in the Shuttle Avionics Integration Laboratory (SAIL). McArthur then served as the crew support astronaut for the Expedition 9 crew during their six-month mission aboard the International Space Station (ISS). She also worked in the Space Station and Space Shuttle Mission Control Centers as a Capsule Communicator (CAPCOM). In 2006, McArthur was the CAPCOM for STS-116. She was also the EVA capcom for the STS-117 mission in 2007. She retired from NASA on August 29, 2025.

=== STS-125 ===
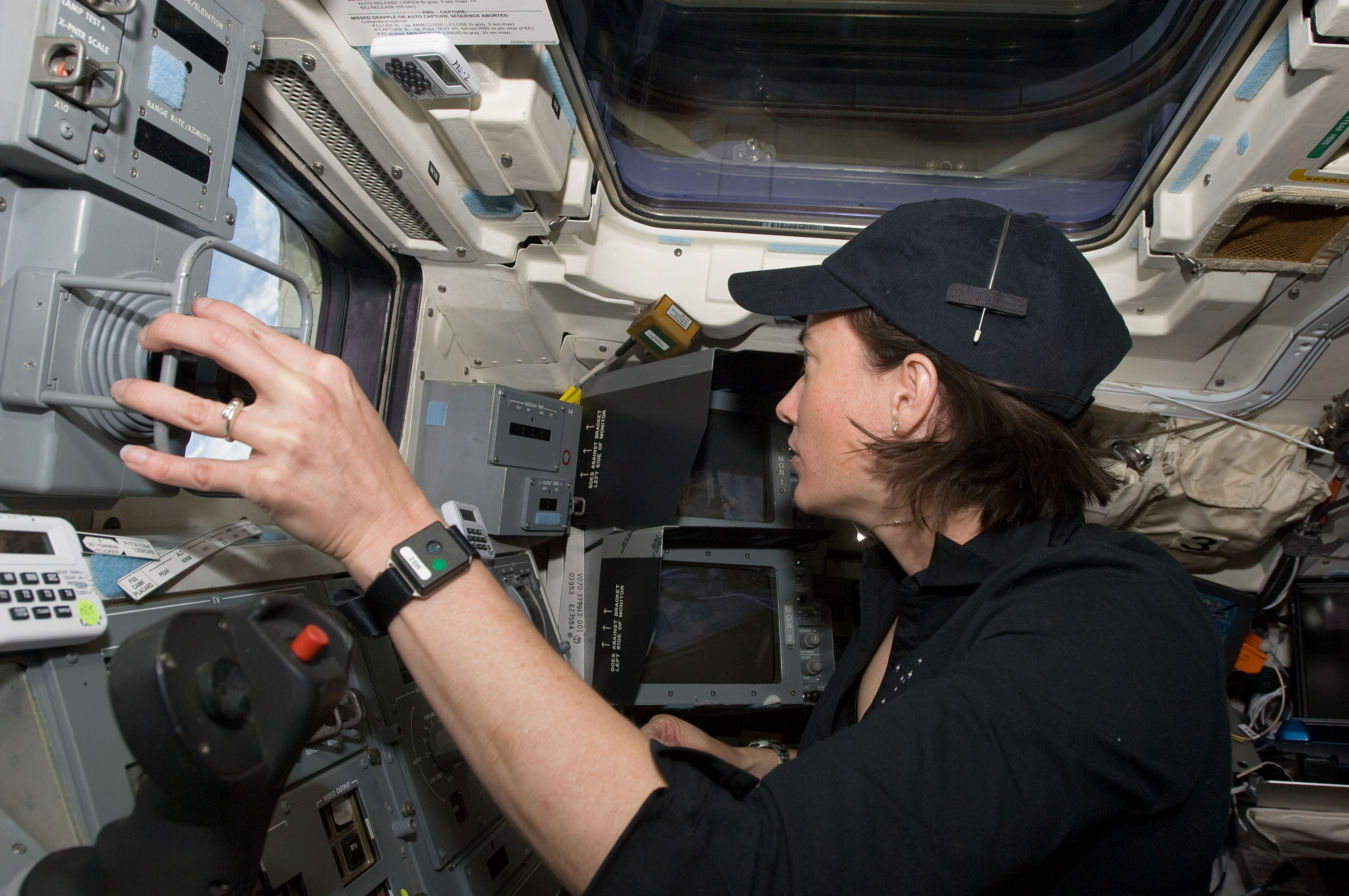
McArthur, STS-125 mission specialist, works the controls of the remote manipulator system (RMS) on the aft flight deck of the Earth-orbiting Space Shuttle Atlantis during flight day eight activities.

In 2009, Megan McArthur was a member of the STS-125 mission to service the Hubble Space Telescope. McArthur was the ascent and entry flight engineer and was the lead robotics crew member for the mission. The mission which lasted almost 13 days was McArthur's first trip into space. In a pre-flight interview, she put it as: "I'll be the last one with hands on the Hubble Space Telescope."

In 2019, McArthur was appointed Deputy Chief of the Astronaut Office.

=== Expedition 65/66 ===
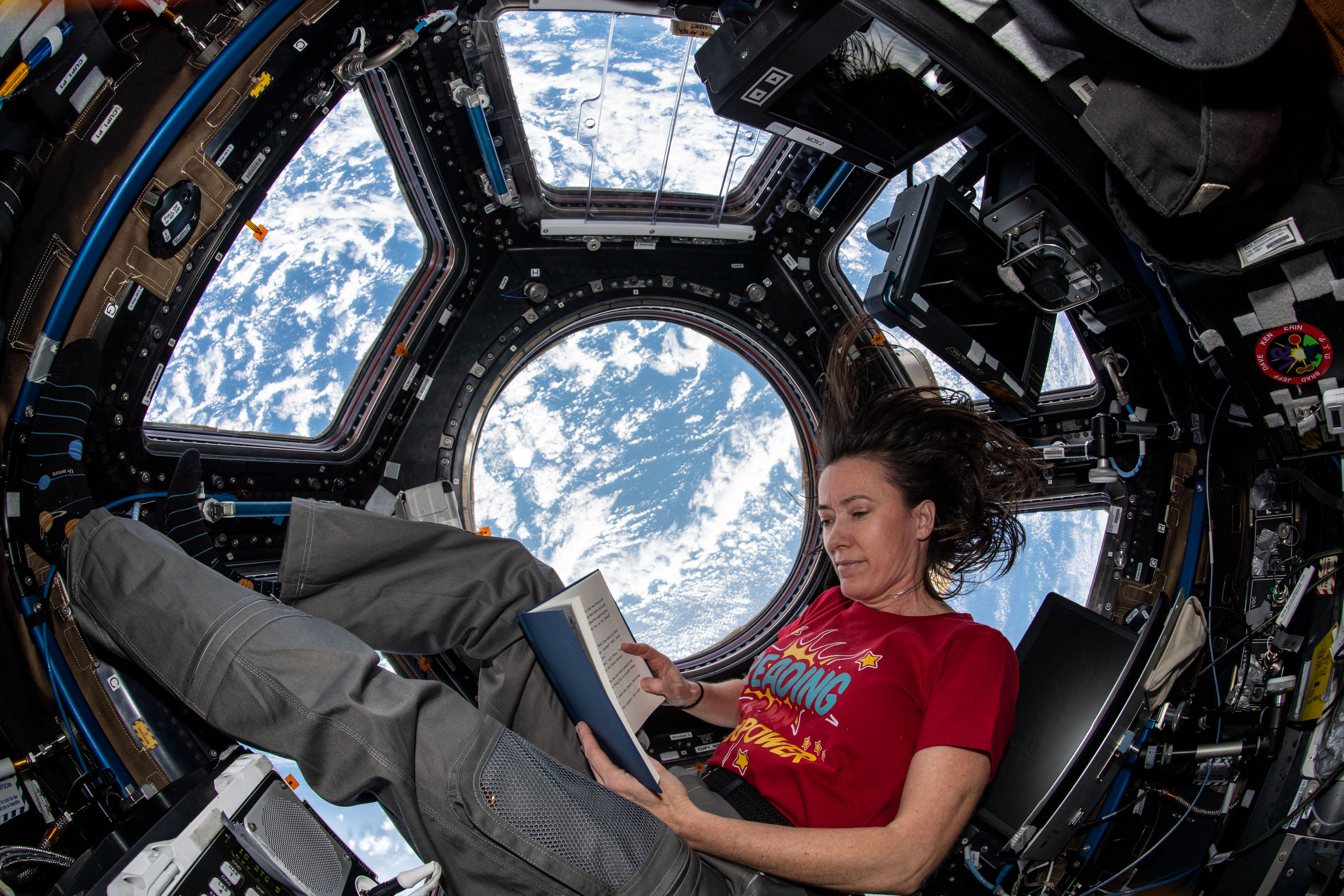
McArthur reading Chapter 5, Flute, the Canary, of the children's book Elmer and the Dragon (1950) by Ruth Stiles Gannett on board the International Space Station, 265 miles above the northern Atlantic Ocean in August 2021.

In July 2020, NASA announced that McArthur would fly into space for the second time on SpaceX Crew-2, along with NASA astronaut Shane Kimbrough, JAXA astronaut Akihiko Hoshide, and ESA astronaut Thomas Pesquet. She used the same seat inside the SpaceX Crew Dragon capsule Endeavour which her husband, Bob Behnken used in SpaceX Demo-2, the first mission of the Endeavour capsule.

Crew-2 launched and docked with the ISS in April 2021, beginning their 6 month mission. It splashed down in the Gulf of Mexico in November 2021.

== Awards and honors ==
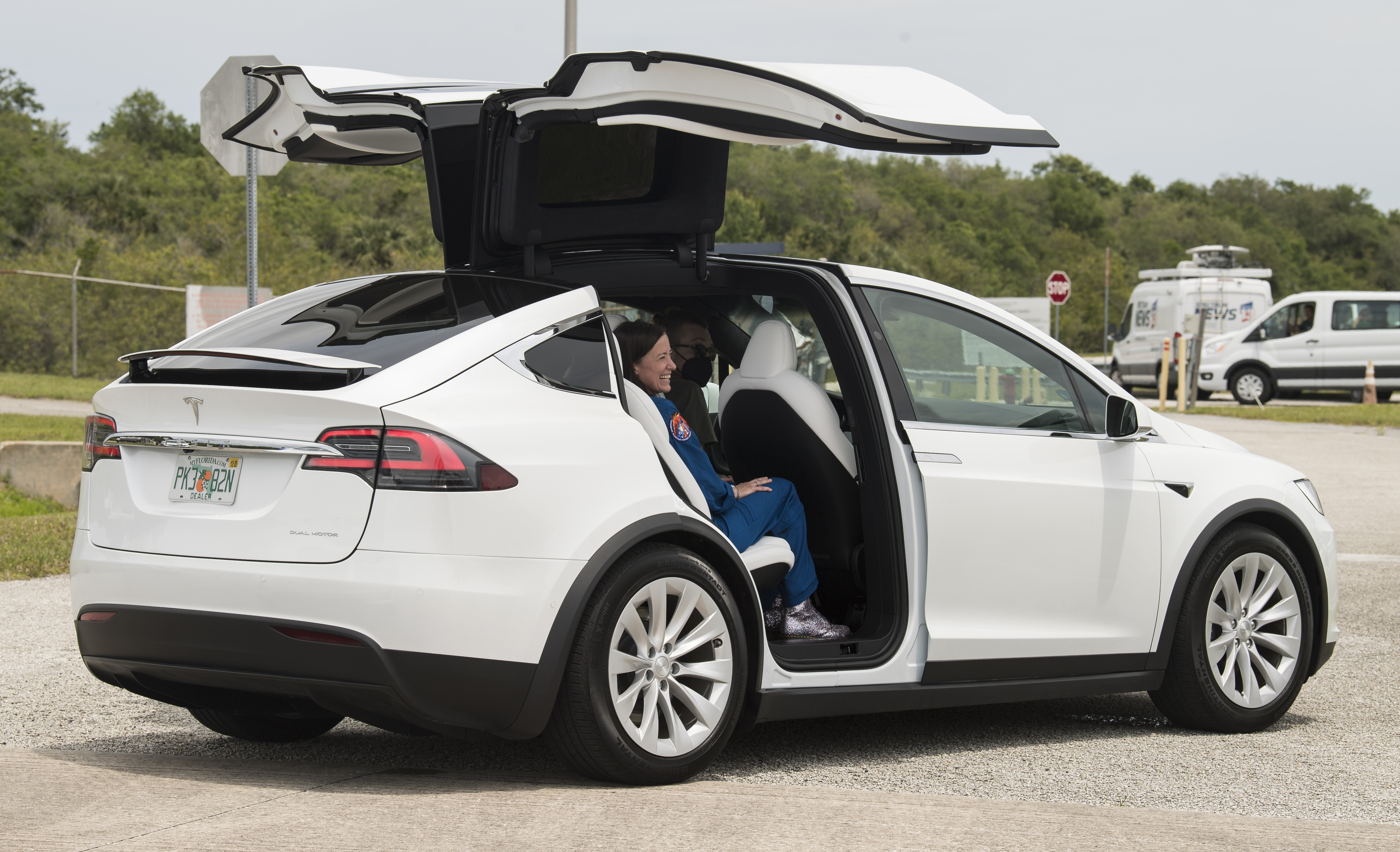
McArthur bids farewell to the media after arriving at the Launch and Landing Facility at NASA’s Kennedy Space Center ahead of SpaceX’s Crew-2 mission

In 2022, SpaceX's Dragon former support vessel GO Searcher was renamed Megan along with GO Navigator as Shannon after SpaceX Crew-1 astronaut, Shannon Walker. A SpaceX fairing recovery/droneship support vessel was named after her husband as Bob in 2021. In 2021, McArthur was selected as a Bloomberg New Economy Catalyst.

== Personal life ==
McArthur is married to fellow astronaut Bob Behnken, and they have one son.

She appeared as an animated version of herself in seasons 4 and 7 of Blaze and the Monster Machines.
