= My Father's Dragon =

Book by Ruth Stiles Gannett

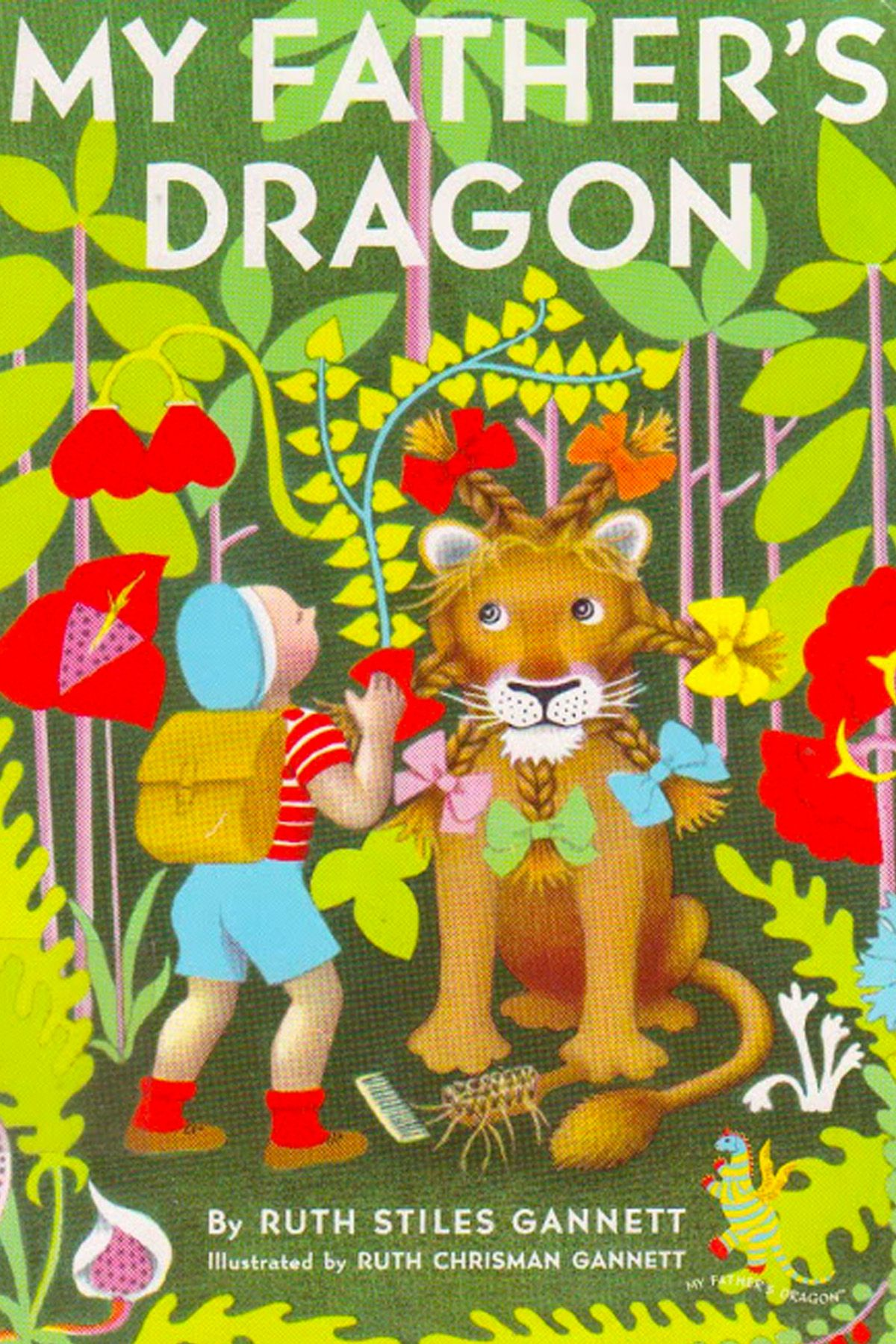
- Author: Ruth Stiles Gannett
- Illustrator: Ruth Chrisman Gannett
- Language: English
- Series: My Father's Dragon trilogy
- Genre: Children's novel
- Publisher: Random House
- Publication date: 2 April 1948
- Publication place: United States
- Media type: Print (hardback & paperback)
- Followed by: Elmer and the Dragon

My Father's Dragon is a 1948 children's novel by Ruth Stiles Gannett, with illustrations by her stepmother Ruth Chrisman Gannett. The novel is about a young boy, Elmer, who runs away to Wild Island to rescue a baby dragon.

Both a Newbery Honor Book and an ALA Notable Book, it is the first book of a trilogy whose other titles are Elmer and the Dragon and The Dragons of Blueland. All three were published in a 50-year anniversary edition as Three Tales of My Father's Dragon.

A Japanese animated film based on the original novel and its illustrations premiered in 1997, while the character Boris the Dragon was produced into a plush toy designed by Sunflower Publishing Company and released in the fall of the same year. A second animated film, based on the trilogy in general, with animation production by Cartoon Saloon, was produced on Netflix in November 11, 2022.

The narrative mode of the original novel is unusual in that the narrator refers to the protagonist only as "my father", giving the impression that this is a true story that happened long ago. The other two books in the trilogy are narrated in the third person.

The illustrations are by Ruth Chrisman Gannett and hand-drawn in black and white with a grease crayon on grained paper. Gannett also illustrated a number of other children's and adult books, including Tortilla Flat by John Steinbeck.

== Awards, nominations, and recognition ==
My Father's Dragon was one runner-up for the 1949 Newbery Medal, by which the American Library Association annually recognizes the year's best American children's book. It was also nominated for the Ambassador Book Award in 1948.

Based on a 2007 online poll, the National Education Association listed it as one of "Teachers' Top 100 Books for Children". In 2012 it was ranked number 49 among all-time children's novels in a survey published by School Library Journal.

== Film, TV, or theatrical adaptations ==
The book was made into a Japanese animated film, which premiered in 1997. It starred the voices of Yu-ki of the pop group TRF as Elmer Elevator and Megumi Hayashibara as Boris the Dragon.

In 2011, the book was adapted into an American children's stage musical by Travis Tagart.

In 2018, Netflix announced that the book would be adapted into an animated feature film of the same name by Irish animation studio Cartoon Saloon for November 11, 2022 release. Nora Twomey was announced as the director with Meg LeFauve as the film's screenwriter. Netflix announced the cast in April 2022 which included Jacob Tremblay as Elmer Elevator and Gaten Matarazzo as Boris the dragon alongside Golshifteh Farahani, Dianne Wiest, Rita Moreno, Chris O'Dowd, Judy Greer, Alan Cumming, Yara Shahidi, Jackie Earle Haley, Mary Kay Place, Leighton Meester, Adam Brody, Charlyne Yi, with Whoopi Goldberg and Ian McShane.

In 2022, the book was featured as a bedtime story in the HBO series Westworld Season 4, Episode 1 "The Auguries".
