= The Dragons of Blueland =

1951 book by Ruth Stiles Gannett

- Author: Ruth Stiles Gannett
- Series: My Father's Dragon
- Publisher: Random House
- Publication date: October 1, 1951
- ISBN: 978-0-394-81092-8
- Preceded by: Elmer and the Dragon (1950)

The Dragons of Blueland is the third and final book in the My Father's Dragon trilogy by Ruth Stiles Gannett. In this novel, the dragon returns to his homeland only to find that his family is in danger. The illustrations within the book are black and white lithographs, done by the author's stepmother, illustrator Ruth Chrisman Gannett.

== Plot introduction ==
Boris the dragon contacts Elmer shortly after the events in Elmer and the Dragon to ask Elmer's help: several men have found his family of dragons and are proposing to sell them to zoos and circuses. Elmer runs away from home again and helps Boris's family to scare off the men permanently.

== Reception ==
Kirkus Reviews provided a short but enthusiastic starred review of The Dragons of Blueland, and of the trilogy implicitly, writing, "The famous Elmer-dragen sagas never seem to wane in freshness and humor ... One rarely encounters Miss Gannett's blend of thrifty story construction and fabulous fantasy in tales of make believe."

== See also ==
- My Father's Dragon
- Elmer and the Dragon
- Elmer's Adventure: My Father's Dragon
