= Elmer and the Dragon =

1950 book by Ruth Stiles Gannett

- First edition
- Author: Ruth Stiles Gannett
- Illustrator: Ruth Chrisman Gannett
- Cover artist: Ruth Chrisman Gannett
- Language: English
- Series: My Father's Dragon trilogy
- Genre: Children's novel
- Publisher: Random House
- Publication date: 1950
- Media type: Print
- Pages: 97 pp (paperback)
- ISBN: 978-0-394-89049-4
- OCLC: 14932567
- LC Class: PZ7.G15 El 1987
- Preceded by: My Father's Dragon
- Followed by: The Dragons of Blueland

Elmer and the Dragon is the second in the My Father's Dragon trilogy of children's novels by Ruth Stiles Gannett. It is preceded by My Father's Dragon and followed by The Dragons of Blueland. In this book, Elmer Elevator and his recently liberated dragon friend travel home, but find themselves marooned on another island inhabited by talkative animals. The illustrations within the book are black and white lithographs, done by the author's stepmother, Ruth Chrisman Gannett.

== Plot summary ==
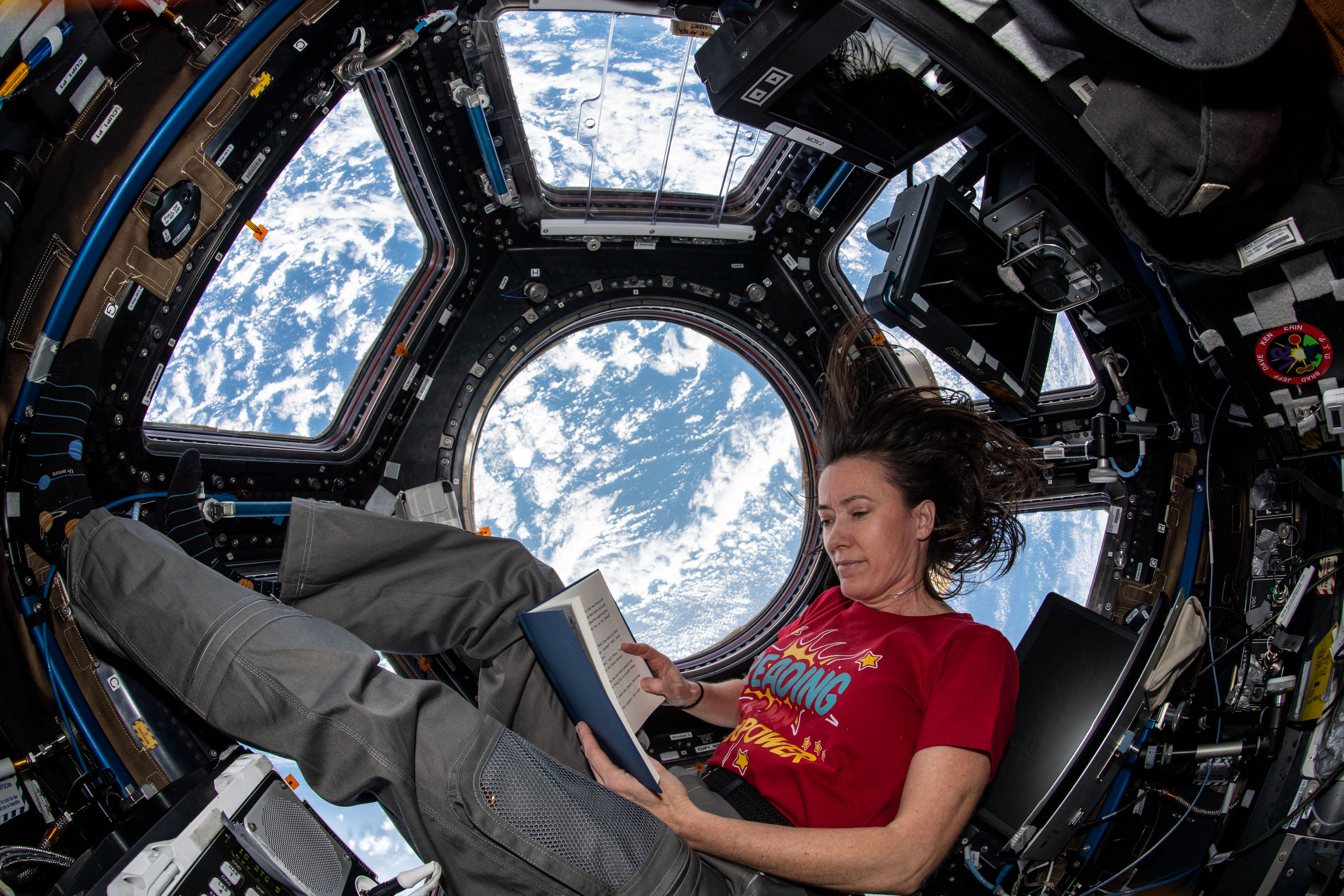
NASA astronaut Megan McArthur reads Chapter 5, Flute, the Canary, of Elmer and the Dragon in August 2021, 265 miles above the northern Atlantic Ocean on board the International Space Station.

Elmer and the dragon (Boris, we learn in book 3) are stranded on a remote island inhabited only by canaries. One of them, Flute, was Elmer's pet until he escaped to Feather Island. Elmer helps Flute and the king and queen canaries to dig up a chest that the island's former human settlers left. Inside are various household items, a watch, a harmonica, and six bags of gold. The dragon flies Elmer back to his house before returning to Blueland,

== See also ==
- Elmer's Adventure: My Father's Dragon
