= My Father's Dragon (2022 film) =

2022 film directed by Nora Twomey

- Official release poster
- Directed by: Nora Twomey
- Screenplay by: Meg LeFauve
- Story by: Meg LeFauve; John Morgan
- Based on: My Father's Dragon by Ruth Stiles Gannett
- Produced by: Bonnie Curtis; Julie Lynn; Paul Young
- Starring: Jacob Tremblay; Gaten Matarazzo; Golshifteh Farahani; Dianne Wiest; Rita Moreno; Chris O'Dowd; Judy Greer; Alan Cumming; Yara Shahidi; Jackie Earle Haley; Whoopi Goldberg; Ian McShane
- Narrated by: Mary Kay Place
- Edited by: Richie Cody; Darren Holmes
- Music by: Mychael Danna; Jeff Danna
- Production companies: Netflix Animation Studios; Mockingbird Pictures; Cartoon Saloon
- Distributed by: Netflix
- Release dates: October 8, 2022 (LFF); November 4, 2022 (Ireland, United States, United Kingdom); November 11, 2022 (Netflix)
- Running time: 99 minutes
- Countries: Ireland; United States
- Language: English

My Father's Dragon is a 2022 animated fantasy adventure comedy film directed by Nora Twomey with a screenplay by Meg LeFauve who co-wrote the story with John Morgan. It is based on the 1948 children's novel of the same name by Ruth Stiles Gannett. The film is also dedicated to Morgan who died from cancer during the film's production in March 2016.

An international co-production of the United States and Ireland, the film features the voices of Jacob Tremblay, Gaten Matarazzo, Golshifteh Farahani, Dianne Wiest, Rita Moreno, Chris O'Dowd, Judy Greer, Alan Cumming, Yara Shahidi, Jackie Earle Haley, Whoopi Goldberg, and Ian McShane.

Co-produced by Netflix Animation, Mockingbird Pictures and Cartoon Saloon, the film was originally set for a 2021 premiere on Netflix, but was pushed to a Netflix release on November 11, 2022, after a limited theatrical release in Ireland, the United States, and the United Kingdom on November 4. Despite receiving positive reviews from critics, it became Cartoon Saloon's first film to not achieve a Best Animated Feature nomination at the Academy Awards.

== Plot ==
An unseen older woman tells the story of her father, Elmer Elevator, when he was a kid. He and his mother, Dela, owned a candy shop in a small town, but were forced to close down and move away after the people of the town moved away. They move to faraway Nevergreen City to rent an apartment from a grumpy landlady named Mrs. McClaren. Intended to open a new shop, they eventually lose all the money they saved up while getting by, presumably by three naughty street kids named Callie, Gertie, and Eugene.

Elmer soon befriends a cat and eventually gets the idea to panhandle the money needed for the store, only for his mother to tell him it is now a lost cause. Angered, Elmer runs to the docks to be alone. The Cat comes to him and speaks to him, much to his shock. She tells him that on an island, Wild Island, beyond the city lies a dragon that can probably help him. Elmer takes the task and is transported to the island on a bubbly whale named Soda. Once they make it to Wild Island, Soda explains that a gorilla named Saiwa is using the dragon to keep the island from sinking, but it remains ineffective.

Elmer frees the dragon, a goofball named Boris, who explains that his kind has been saving the island as long as anyone can remember, and after he succeeds, he will be an "After Dragon". However, they discover that Boris cannot fly due to breaking his wing when Elmer saved him, and he reveals that he is afraid of both water and fire. The two make an agreement that Boris will help Elmer raise enough cash to buy a new store and will let the dragon go free once finished, and they go on an adventure in search of a tortoise named Aratuah to find out how Boris can keep the island from sinking for the next century. Along the way, they encounter some of the island's inhabitants, like Cornelius the crocodile, the tiger siblings Sasha and George, and a mother rhinoceros named Iris all while trying to evade Saiwa and his monkey army.

They soon make it to Aratuah's shell, but Elmer finds out that he died, and leaves as the island continues to sink. While resting on a flower, they are found by Saiwa and his forces and Saiwa reveals he knew about Aratuah's death, which angers his macaque 2nd-in-command Kwan, who proceeds to use a giant mushroom as a raft to leave the island. While flying with Boris, Elmer has an epiphany; it is the roots below the island that pull it down. He convinces Boris to fly with all his might and break the roots. Boris breaks two of the roots, but has his own epiphany of how to save the island alone (without Elmer).

Elmer falls into the water but is saved by Saiwa, who is evacuating the island with the other animals. He confronts Elmer for wanting to use Boris, and not truly being a friend. He then reveals that once he found out about Aratuah's death and saw how foolish and frightened Boris was, he knew everyone would drown in fear before the ocean swallowed the island. So, he used Boris to carry out the only solution he knew: forcing the dragon to lift the island up, over and over.

Wanting to fix things, Elmer goes back to the island to Boris and helps him find the courage to jump into the summit's fire and inhale it. This restores the roots, which were actually holding the island up, but had weakened after a century. Boris finally becomes an "After Dragon", and tells the animals how to teach future dragons the right way to save the island. He takes Elmer home, passing by a surprised Kwan residing over on tangerine trees. Elmer reunites with his mother and the film ends with him embracing his new life in the city with his daughter narrating the end of the story.

== Voice cast ==
- Jacob Tremblay as Elmer Elevator
- Gaten Matarazzo as Boris the Dragon
- Golshifteh Farahani as Dela Elevator, Elmer's widowed mother
- Ian McShane as Saiwa the Gorilla
- Chris O'Dowd as Kwan the Macaque
- Jackie Earle Haley as Tamir the Tarsier
- Dianne Wiest as Iris the Rhinoceros
- Rita Moreno as Mrs. McClaren
- Judy Greer as Soda the Whale
- Alan Cumming as Cornelius the Crocodile
- Yara Shahidi as Callie
- Whoopi Goldberg as the Cat
- Mary Kay Place as The Narrator, Elmer's daughter
- Leighton Meester as Sasha the Tiger, and George's sister
- Spence Moore II as George the Tiger, and Sasha's brother
- Adam Brody as Bob
- Lo Mutuc (Note: Credited as Charlyne Yi) as Magda
- Jack S.A. Smith as Eugene
- Maggie Lincoln as Gertie

Additional voices by Debi Derryberry, Skip Stellrecht, Hope Levy, Terence Mathews, Annabel Lew, Andrew Morgado, Jim Pirri, Jon Olson, Cat Ring, Fred Tatasciore, Michelle Ruff, Eric Tiede, Georgia Simon, Frank Todaro, Kelly Stables, and Nora Twomey.

== Production ==
In June 2016, it was reported that Cartoon Saloon was developing an adaptation of My Father's Dragon, with Tomm Moore and Nora Twomey co-directing it. In November 2018, Netflix announced that it had come on board the project. Twomey was now the sole director.

In April 2022, the cast was revealed along with a first image from the film, and Mychael and Jeff Danna as the composers of the film score.

As in Cartoon Saloon's previous feature films starting with Song of the Sea, the studio continued their use of TVPaint Animation for the hand-drawn brush and pencil strokes in the character animation, but for the first time, it used Toon Boom Harmony for effects and digital ink-and-paint. Moho software was also used for rigged animation of props and background elements, and also to handle background crowd animation.

== Release ==
My Father's Dragon had its world premiere at the 66th BFI London Film Festival on October 8, 2022. The North American premiere was at the Animation Is Film Festival on October 22, 2022.

In November 2018, Netflix previously announced that the film would be released in 2021. However, in January 2021, Netflix CEO Ted Sarandos revealed that the film's release could be moved to "2022 or later", to meet Netflix's criteria of releasing six animated features per year. The film was shown in select theatres for a limited time in Ireland, the United States, and the United Kingdom on November 4, 2022. It was released on Netflix on November 11, 2022.

== Reception ==
=== Critical response ===
On the review aggregator website Rotten Tomatoes, 87% of 71 critics' reviews are positive, with an average rating of 7.2/10. The website's consensus reads: "My Father's Dragon will soar particularly high with very young viewers, but this animated adventure has something to offer audiences of all ages." and on Metacritic the film has a score of 74 out of 100, based on 21 critics, indicating "generally favorable" reviews.

=== Accolades ===
Award	Date of Ceremony	Category	Recipient(s)	Result	Ref.
Animation is Film Festival	October 22, 2022	Special Jury Prize Award	My Father's Dragon	Won	
Hollywood Music in Media Awards	November 16, 2022	Best Original Song in an Animated Film	Mychael Danna, Jeff Danna, Frank Danna, Nora Twomey, Meg LeFauve ("Lift Your Wings")	Nominated	
Annie Awards	February 25, 2023	Best Animated Feature – Independent	My Father's Dragon	Nominated	
Annie Awards	February 25, 2023	Outstanding Achievement for Directing in a Feature Production	Nora Twomey	Nominated	
