= Bob Behnken =

US Air Force officer, astronaut and former Chief of the Astronaut Office (born 1970)

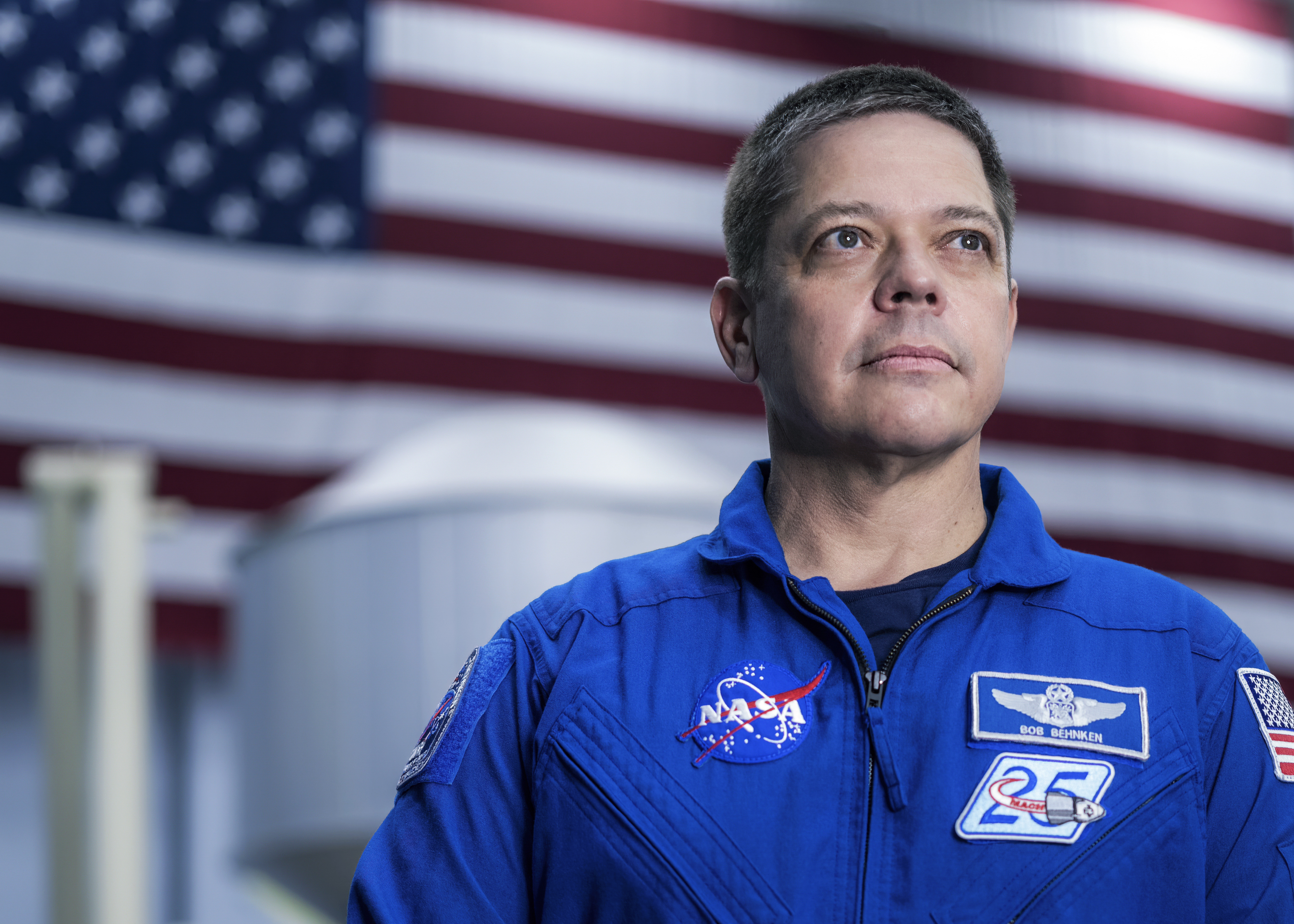
- Behnken in 2022
- Born: Robert Louis Behnken; July 28, 1970 (age 56); St. Ann, Missouri, U.S.
- Education: Washington University (BS); California Institute of Technology (MS, PhD)
- Spouse: Megan McArthur
- Children: 1
- Space career

NASA astronaut
- Rank: Colonel, USAF
- Time in space: 93d 11h 42m
- Selection: NASA Group 18 (2000)
- Total EVAs: 10
- Total EVA time: 61h 10m
- Missions: STS-123; STS-130; SpX-DM2 (Expedition 63)
- Mission insignia
- Retired: November 11, 2022

Robert Louis Behnken (/ˈbɛnkən/; born July 28, 1970) is an American engineer, a former NASA astronaut, and former Chief of the Astronaut Office.

Behnken holds a Ph.D. in mechanical engineering and the rank of colonel in the U.S. Air Force, where he served before joining NASA in 2000. He flew aboard Space Shuttle missions STS-123 (2008) and STS-130 (2010) as a mission specialist, accumulating over 708 hours in space, including 55 hours of spacewalk time. He is married to fellow astronaut Megan McArthur.

Following retirement of the Space Shuttle, Behnken was Chief of the Astronaut Office from 2012 to 2015. Assigned to the SpaceX Dragon 2 in 2018 as part of NASA's Commercial Crew Program, Behnken launched aboard the spacecraft's first crewed mission with fellow astronaut Doug Hurley on May 30, 2020, and became one of the first two astronauts launching aboard a commercial orbital spacecraft in spaceflight history. The mission, Crew Dragon Demo-2, took Behnken and Hurley to the International Space Station (ISS), where they docked and stayed aboard for 62 days. Behnken completed four spacewalks with NASA astronaut Christopher Cassidy.

== Education ==
Behnken attended Pattonville High School in Maryland Heights, Missouri (in St. Louis County), and went on to earn Bachelor of Science degrees in mechanical engineering and physics from Washington University in St. Louis in 1992. He then attended the California Institute of Technology, where he earned an MS degree in 1993 and a PhD in 1997, both in mechanical engineering. While at Caltech he shared a doctoral advisor, Christopher E. Brennen, with another future NASA astronaut, Garrett Reisman.

Behnken's graduate thesis research was in the area of nonlinear control applied to stabilizing rotating stall and surge in axial-flow compressors. The research included nonlinear analysis, real-time software implementation development, and extensive hardware construction. During his first two years of graduate study, Behnken developed and implemented real-time control algorithms and hardware for flexible robotic manipulators.

== Air Force career ==
Before entering graduate school, Behnken was an Air Force ROTC student at Washington University in St. Louis, and after graduate school was assigned to enter Air Force active duty at Eglin AFB, Florida. While at Eglin, he worked as a technical manager and developmental engineer for new munitions systems. Behnken was next assigned to attend the U.S. Air Force Test Pilot School Flight Test Engineer's course at Edwards AFB, California. After graduating, he was assigned to the F-22 Combined Test Force (CTF) and remained at Edwards. While assigned to the F-22 program, Behnken was the lead flight test engineer for Raptor 4004 and a special projects test director. These responsibilities included flight test sortie planning, control room configuration development, and test conduct. Behnken also flew in both the F-15 and F-16 aircraft in support of the F-22 flight test program.

== NASA career ==
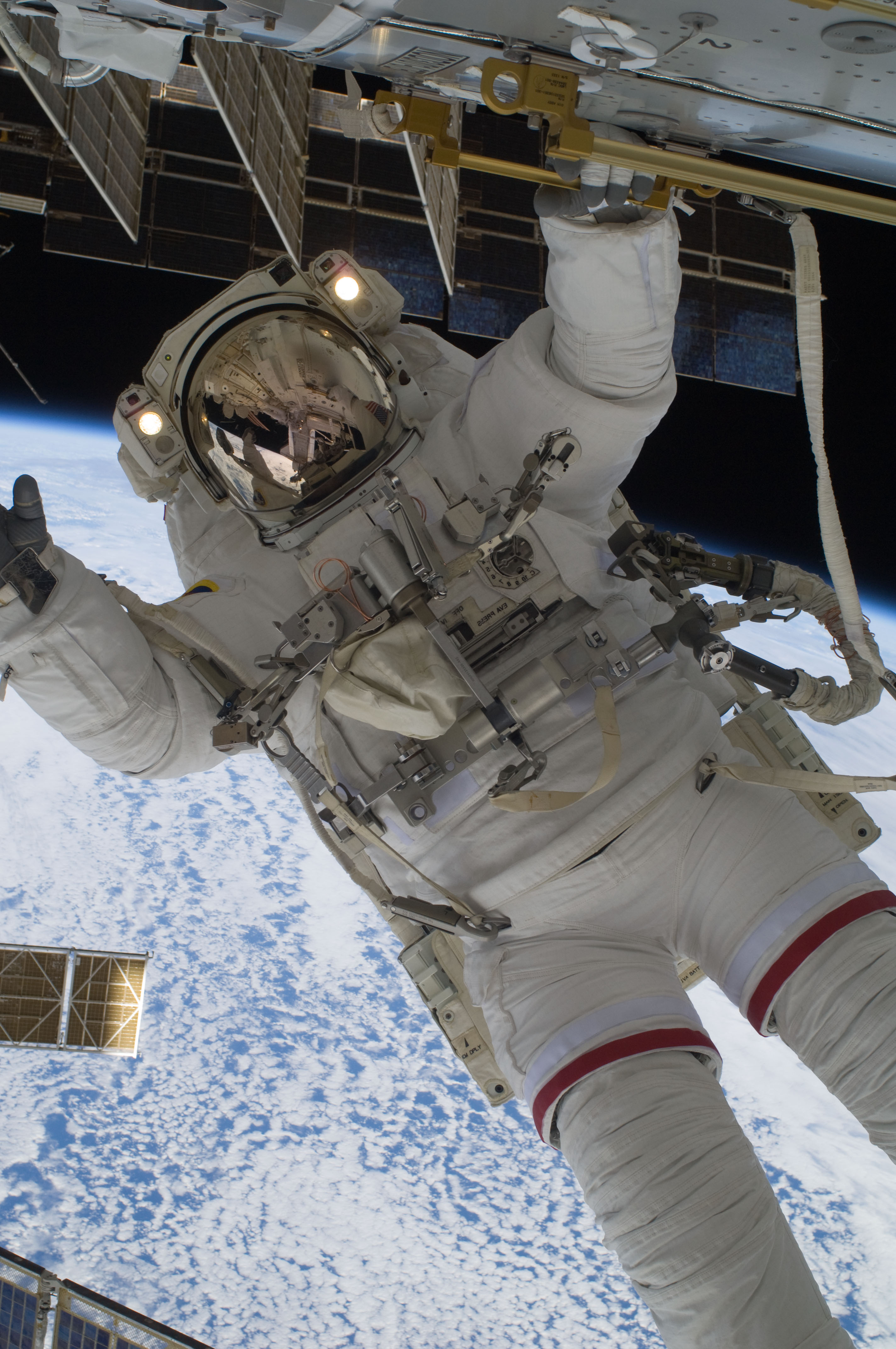
Behnken carrying out a spacewalk during the STS-130 mission

Selected as an astronaut candidate by NASA in July 2000, Behnken reported for training in August 2000. Following the completion of 18 months of training and evaluation, he was assigned technical duties in the Astronaut Office Shuttle Operations Branch supporting launch and landing operations at Kennedy Space Center, Florida.

In September 2006, Behnken served as an aquanaut during the NEEMO 11 mission aboard the Aquarius underwater laboratory, living and working underwater for seven days.

=== STS-123 ===
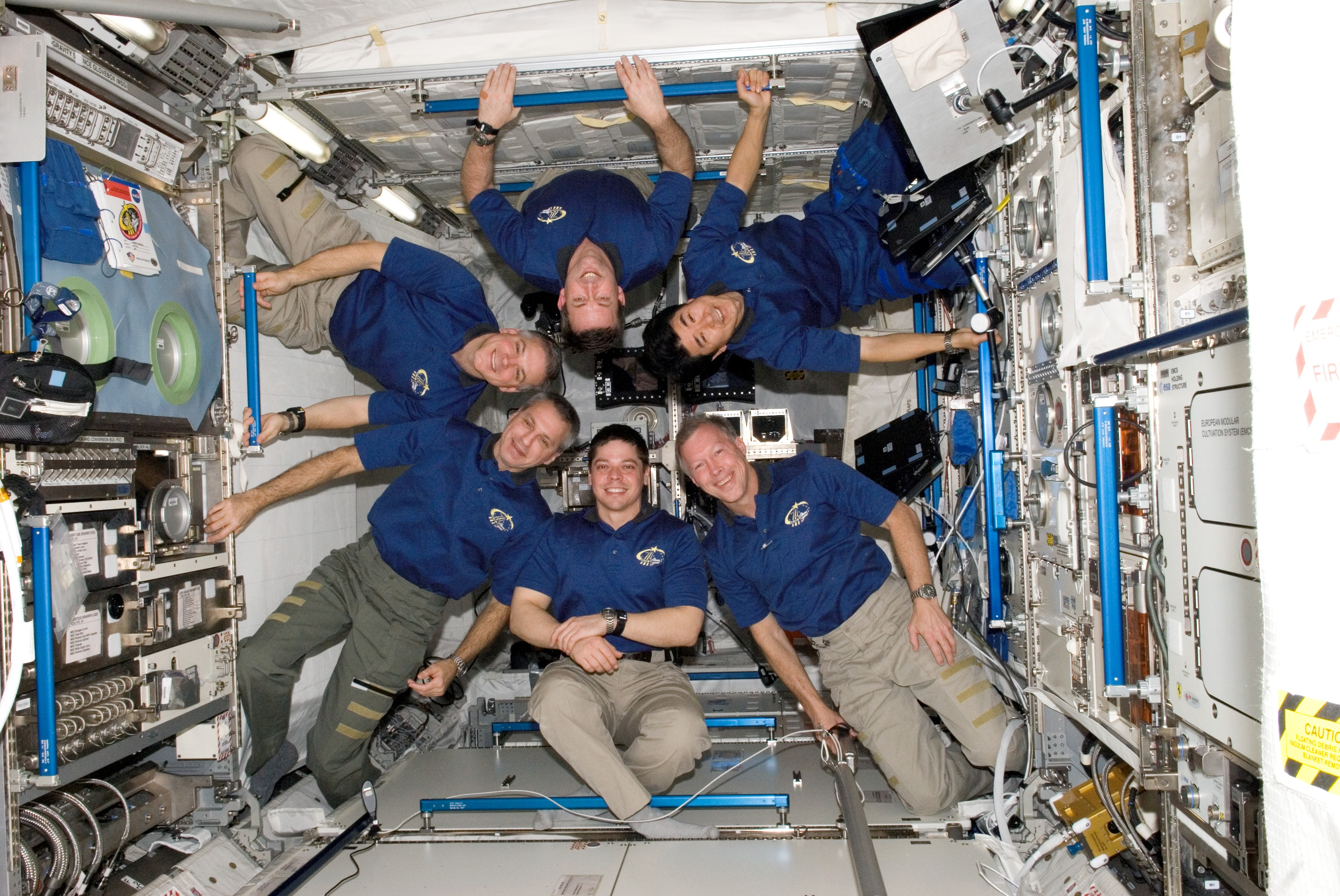
STS-123 crew on board the ISS

Behnken was a crew member of the STS-123 mission that delivered the Japanese Experiment Module and the Special Purpose Dexterous Manipulator to the International Space Station in March 2008. Behnken took part in three spacewalks during the mission.

=== STS-130 ===
Behnken flew to space for the second time as a mission specialist on STS-130, which launched at 04:14 EST (09:14 UTC) February 8, 2010. This mission delivered the Tranquility module and Cupola to the International Space Station. Behnken again took part in three spacewalks during this mission.

=== Chief of the Astronaut Office ===
In July 2012, Behnken was named Chief of the Astronaut Office, succeeding Peggy Whitson. He held the job until July 2015, when he was succeeded by Chris Cassidy, after being selected as one of four astronauts training to fly spacecraft contracted under NASA's Commercial Crew Program.

=== SpX-DM2 ===
In August 2018, Behnken was assigned to the first test flight SpX-DM2 of the SpaceX Crew Dragon. Behnken and fellow crewmember Douglas Hurley were humorously compared in news and social media to the fictional brothers Bob and Doug McKenzie because of their friendship when they participated in the first commercial astronaut launch on SpaceX Crew Dragon Demo-2. It successfully launched on May 30, 2020. The spacecraft successfully docked with the International Space Station on May 31, 2020. Behnken and Doug Hurley joined the ISS Expedition 63 crew, which also consisted of NASA astronaut Chris Cassidy and Russian cosmonauts Ivan Vagner and Anatoli Ivanishin. They returned to Earth in the same capsule on August 2, 2020. His seat of the SpaceX Endeavour was later used by his wife, K. Megan McArthur in SpaceX Crew-2 mission, which was the second flight of Endeavour.

Demo-2 Gallery
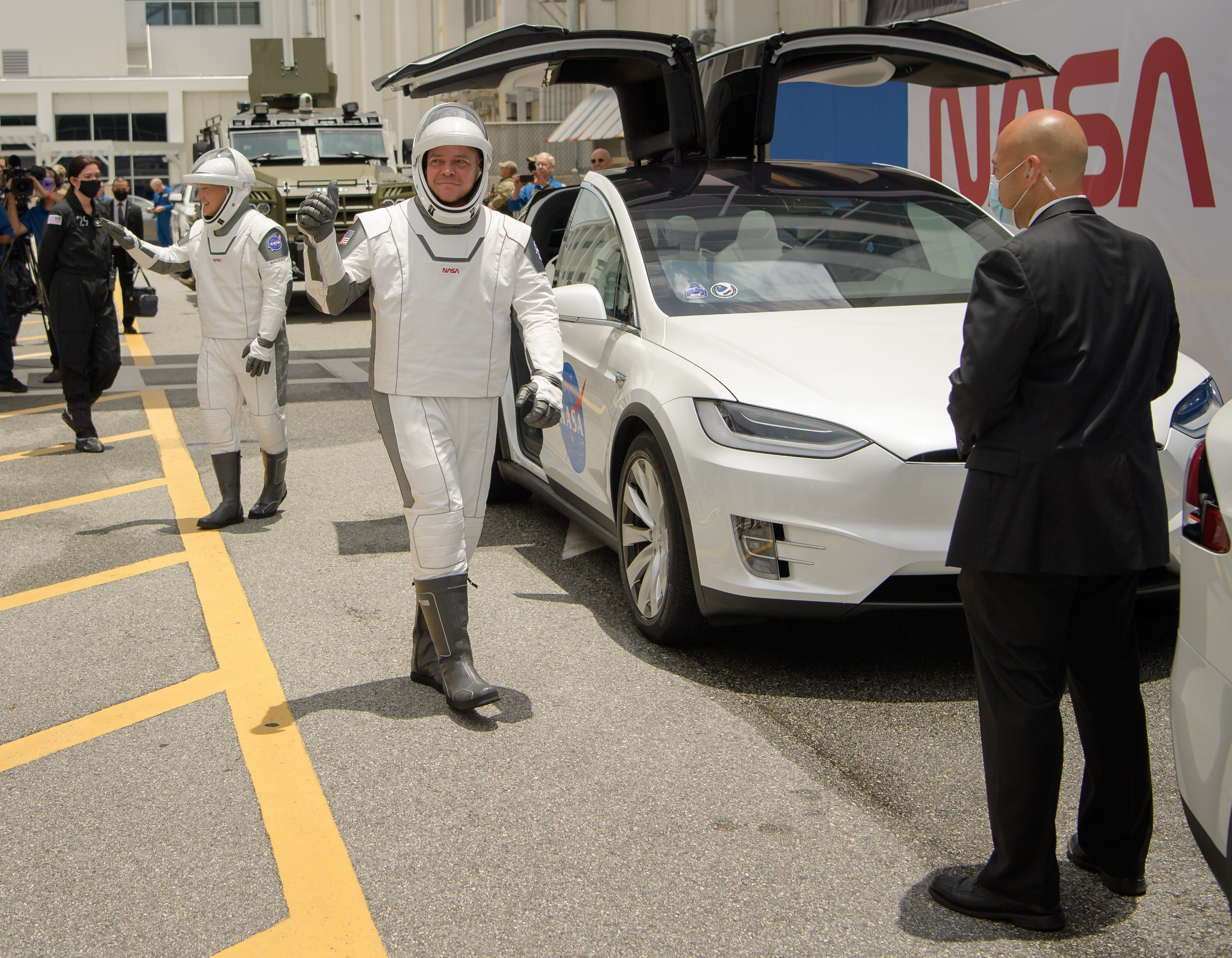
Robert Behnken departing the Neil A. Armstrong Operations and Checkout Building before Demo-2 launch.

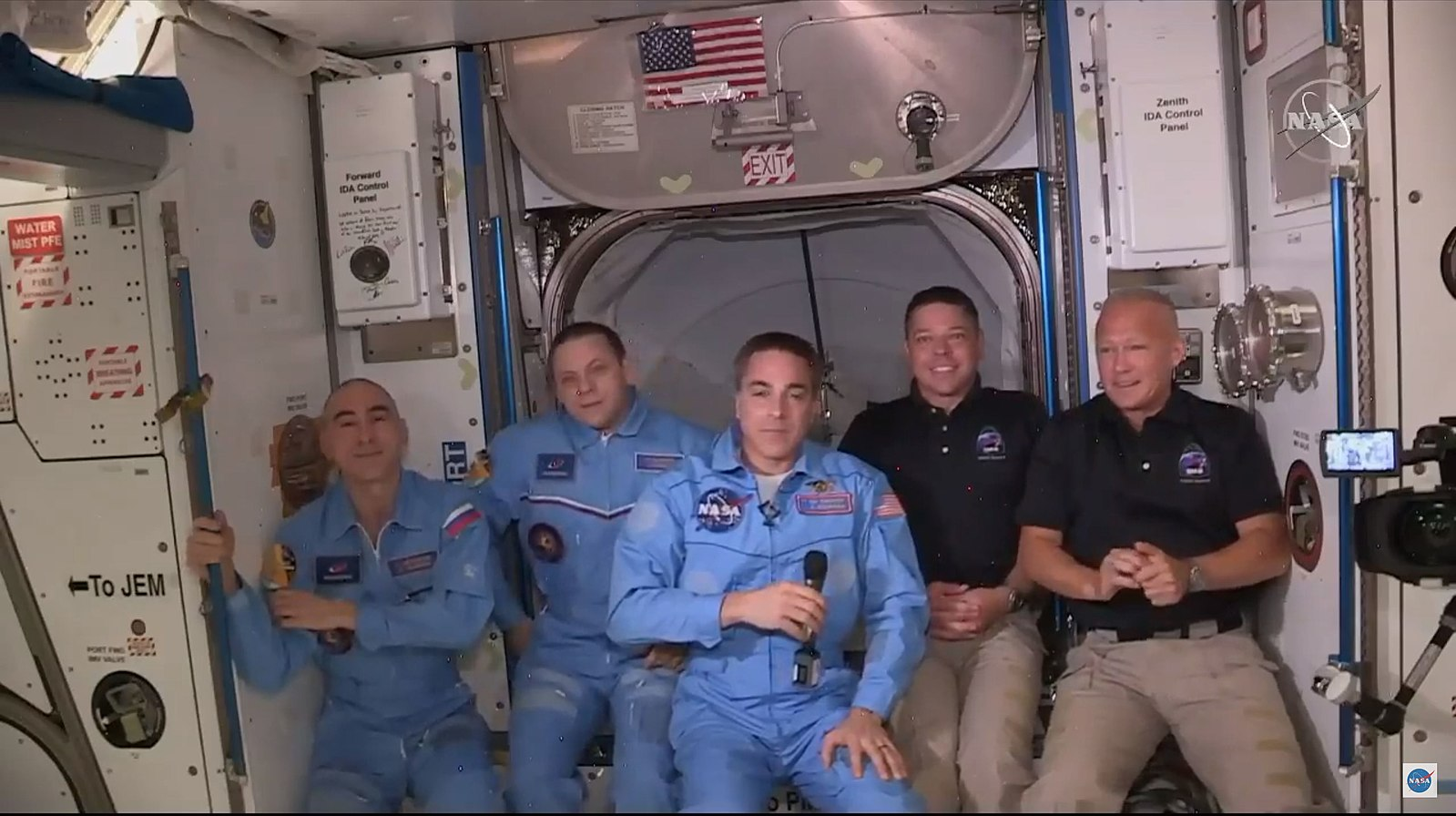
ISS and Demo 2 crews after hatch opening

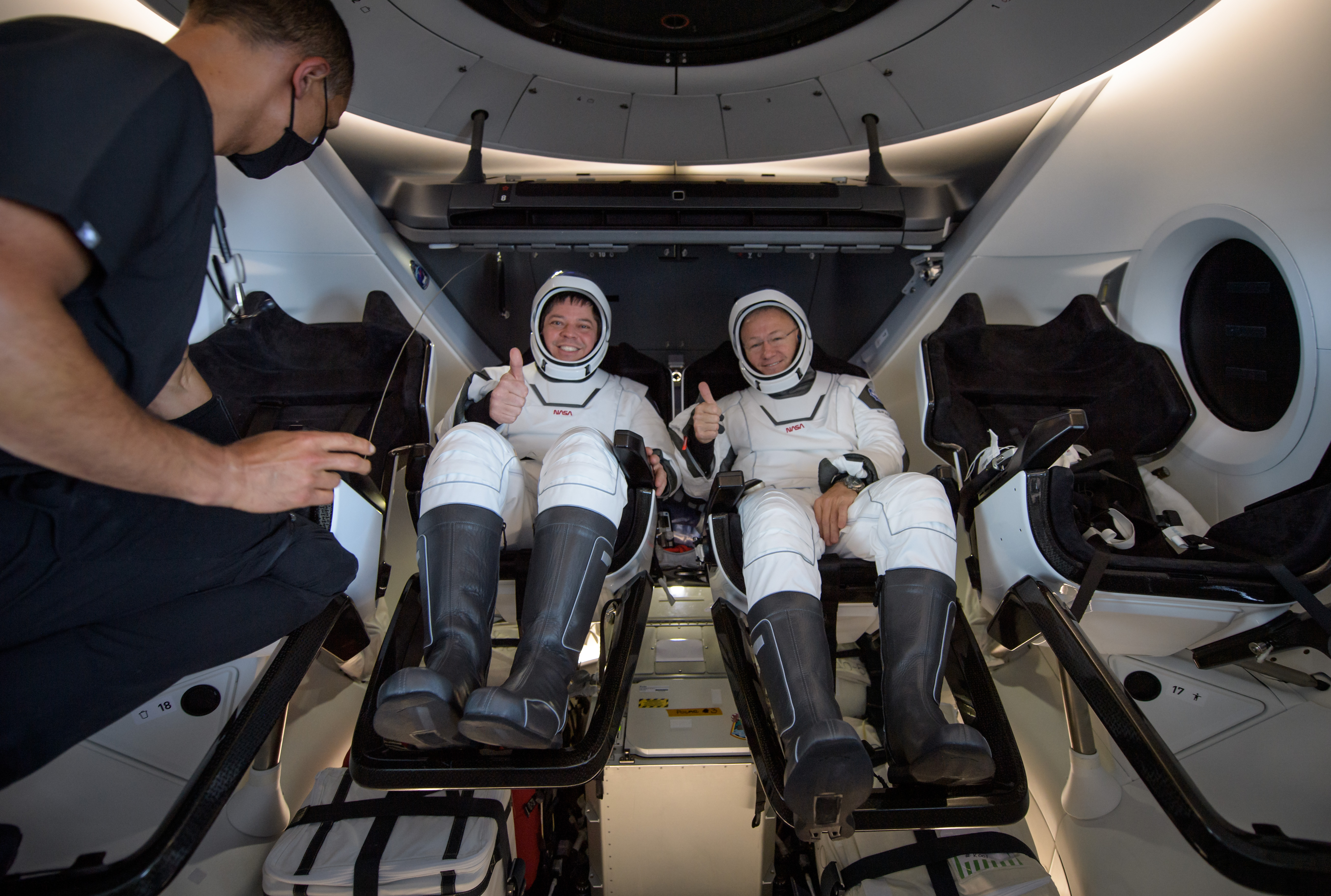
Robert Behnken and Douglas Hurley are seen inside Endeavour onboard GO Navigator after splashdown.

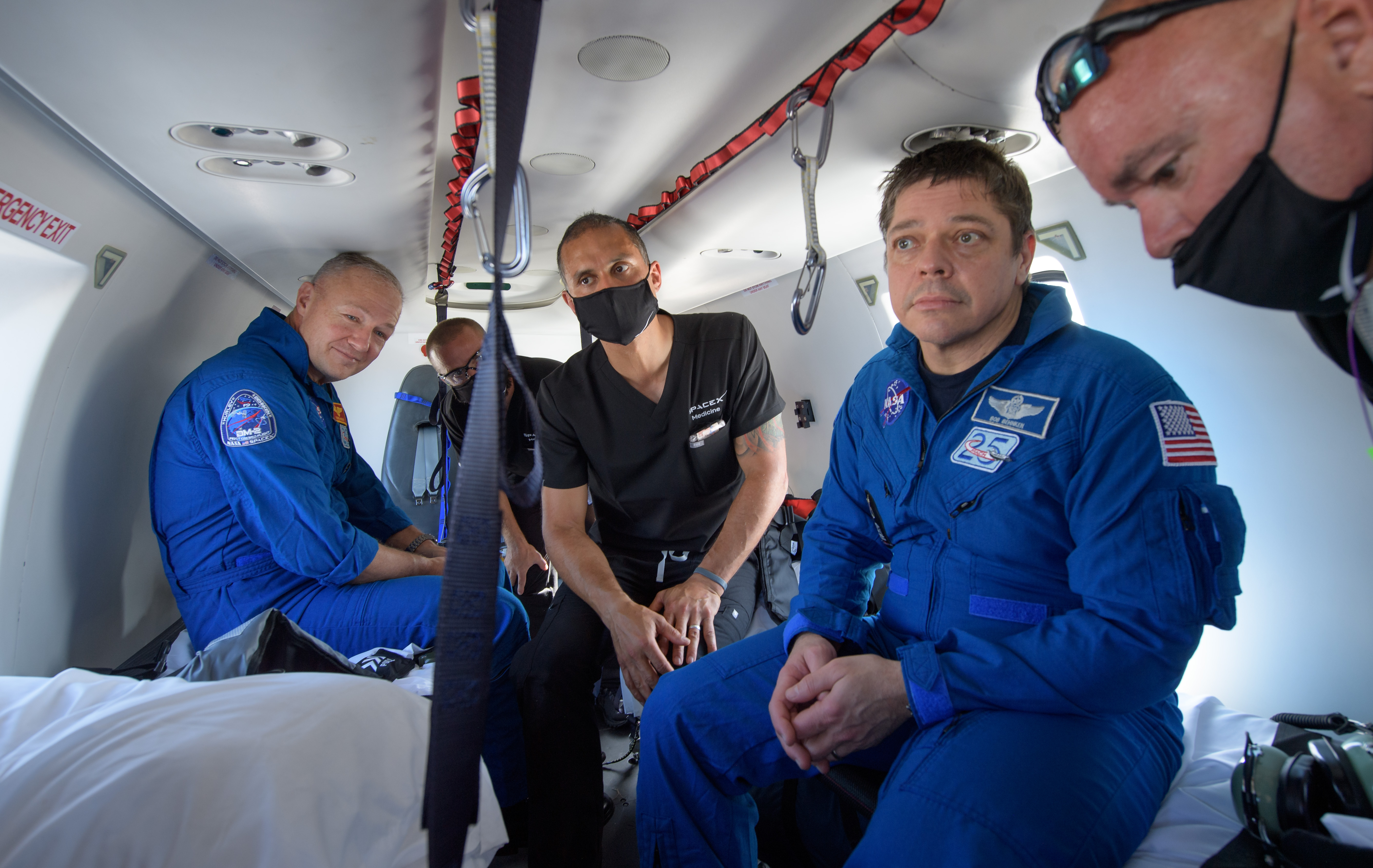
Robert Behnken and Douglas Hurley prepare to depart their helicopter at Naval Air Station Pensacola

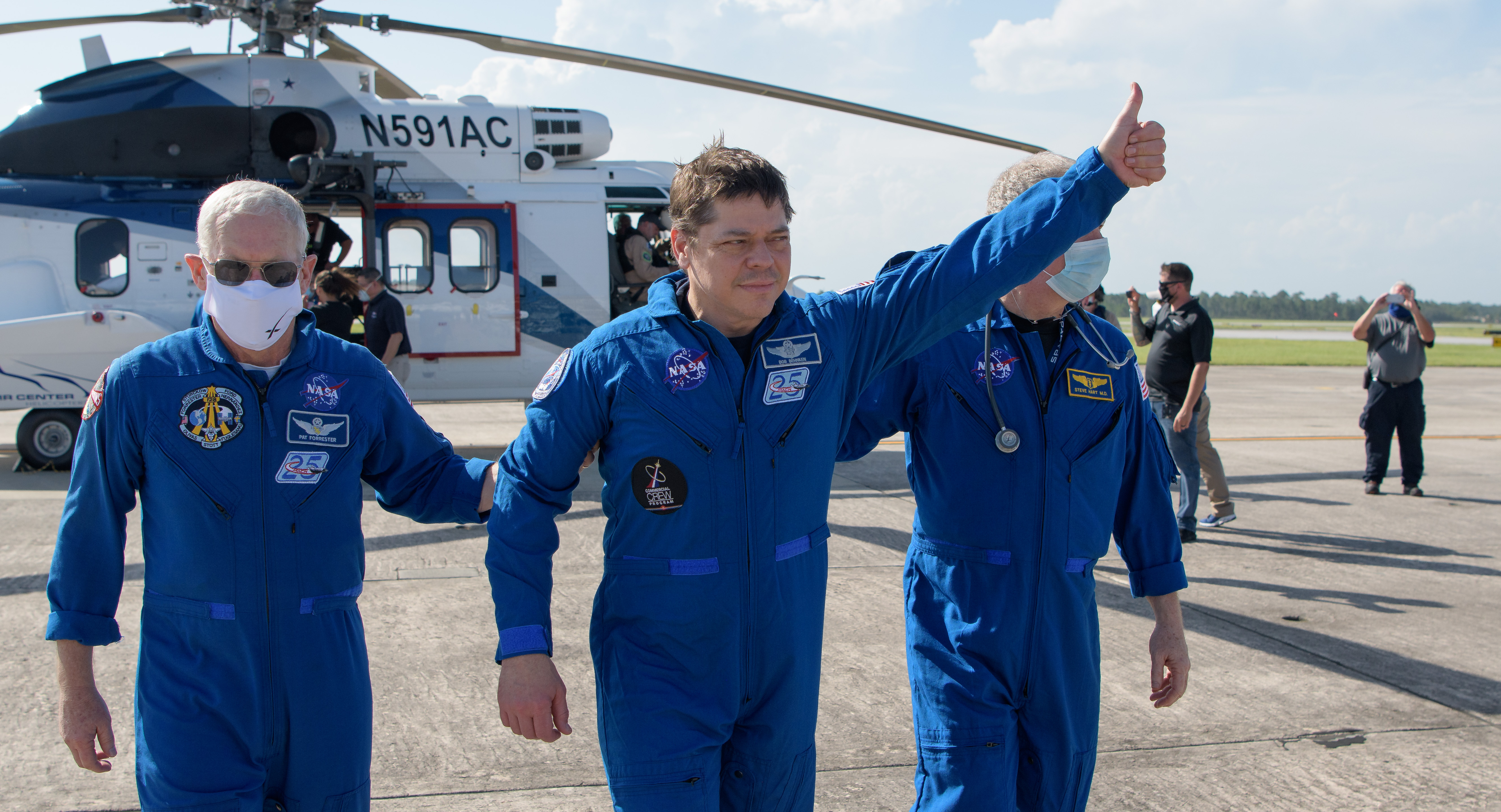
Robert Behnken gives a thumbs up to onlookers as he boards a plane at Naval Air Station Pensacola

Behnken retired from NASA on November 11, 2022.

== Personal life ==
Behnken is married to fellow astronaut Megan McArthur and they have one son. Behnken holds an amateur radio license with the call sign KE5GGX. His wife flew on the Crew-2 mission, using the same Dragon capsule and the same seat that he used during the Demo-2 mission. She returned from the International Space Station on November 8, 2021.

== Awards and honors ==
- Outstanding Mechanical Engineering Senior, Washington University (1992)
- National Science Foundation Graduate Research Fellow (1993–1996)
- Air Force Research Laboratory Munitions Directorate, Eglin AFB, Company Grade Officer of the Year (1997)
- Air Force Achievement Medal (1997); Air Force Commendation Medal (1998, 2000)
- Distinguished graduate from the USAF Test Pilot School Program (1999)
- Recipient of the USAF Test Pilot School Colonel Ray Jones Award as the top Flight Test Engineer/Flight Test Navigator in class 98B.
- SpaceX purchased two ships for towing and supporting autonomous spaceport drone ship and fairing recovery operations on the east coast in May 2021. These two ships were named in honour of Behnken and his Demo-2, crewmate, Doug Hurley as Doug and Bob. The earlier names of the ships were Ella G and Ingrid respectively.
- On January 31, 2023, Behnken was awarded the Congressional Space Medal of Honor for NASA's SpaceX Demonstration Mission-2 (Demo-2) to the International Space Station in 2020.

Preceded by Peggy Whitson	Chief of the Astronaut Office; 2012–2015	Succeeded by Christopher Cassidy
