= SpaceX Crew-2 =

2021 American crewed spaceflight to the ISS

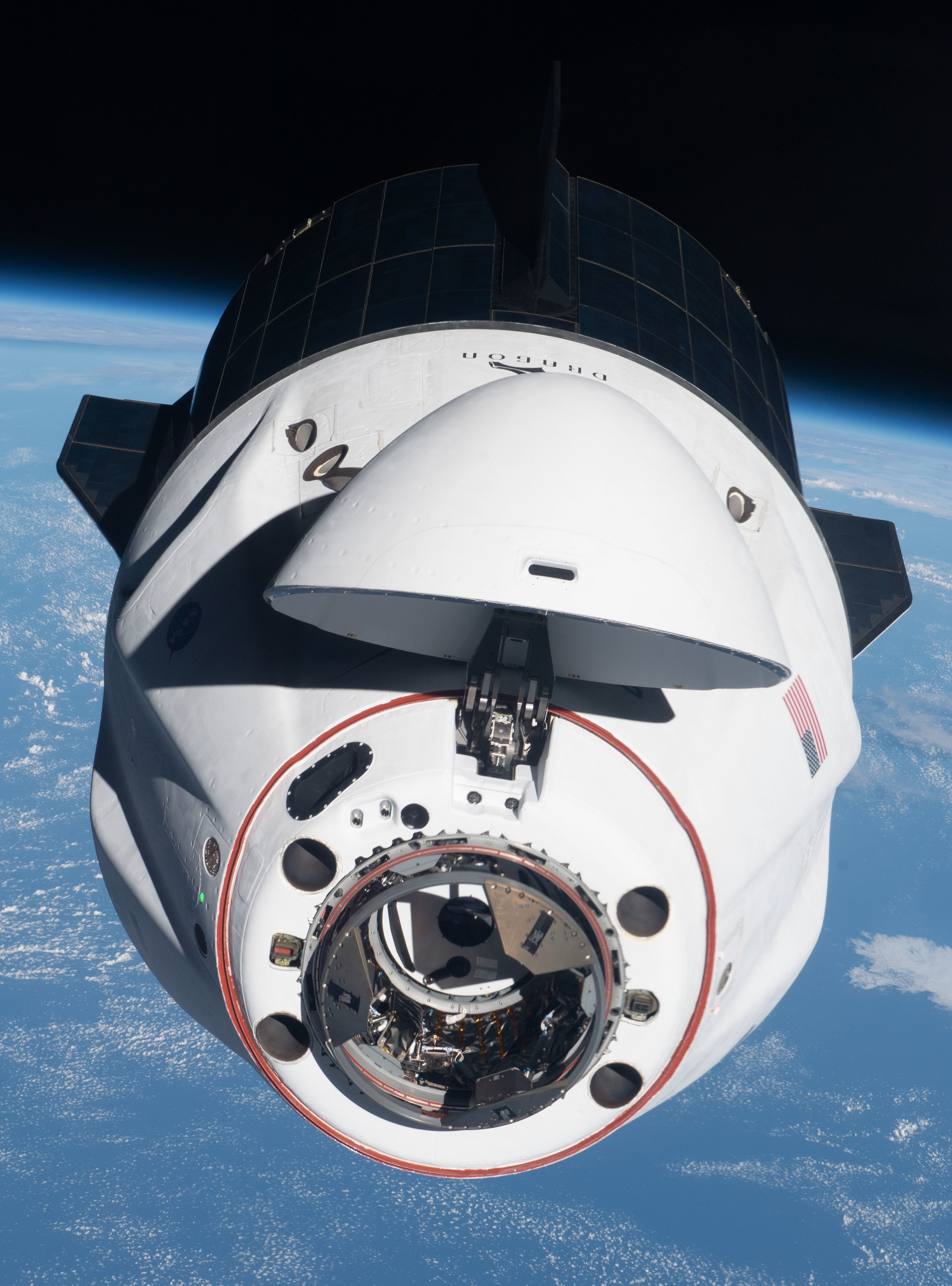
- Endeavour approaches the ISS
- Names: USCV-2 (2012–2019); Crew-2
- Mission type: ISS crew transport
- Operator: SpaceX
- COSPAR ID: 2021-030A
- SATCAT no.: 48209
- Mission duration: 199 days, 17 hours, 44 minutes, 13 seconds

Spacecraft properties
- Spacecraft: Crew Dragon Endeavour
- Spacecraft type: Crew Dragon
- Manufacturer: SpaceX
- Launch mass: 12,055 kg (26,577 lb)
- Landing mass: 9,616 kg (21,200 lb)

Crew
- Crew size: 4
- Members: Shane Kimbrough; K. Megan McArthur; Akihiko Hoshide; Thomas Pesquet
- Expedition: Expedition 65/66

Start of mission
- Launch date: April 23, 2021, 09:49:02 UTC (5:27:17 am EDT)
- Rocket: Falcon 9 Block 5 B1061-2
- Launch site: Kennedy, LC‑39A

End of mission
- Recovered by: MV GO Navigator
- Landing date: November 9, 2021, 03:33:15 UTC (10:33:15 pm EST)
- Landing site: Gulf of Mexico, near Pensacola, Florida

Orbital parameters
- Reference system: Geocentric orbit
- Regime: Low Earth orbit
- Inclination: 51.66°

Docking with ISS
- Docking port: Harmony forward
- Docking date: April 24, 2021, 09:07:55 UTC
- Undocking date: July 21, 2021, 10:45 UTC
- Time docked: 88 days, 1 hour, 37 minutes

Docking with ISS (relocation) (Note: From an orbital dynamics perspective, the forward port is easier to approach, and therefore, new vehicles use this approach for their first docking. The Boeing Starliner was scheduled to make its first docking on OFT-2 at the end of July 2021; therefore, Crew-2 relocated to the zenith port to clear the forward port for OFT-2.)
- Docking port: Harmony zenith
- Docking date: July 21, 2021, 11:36 UTC
- Undocking date: November 8, 2021, 19:05 UTC
- Time docked: 110 days, 7 hours, 29 minutes
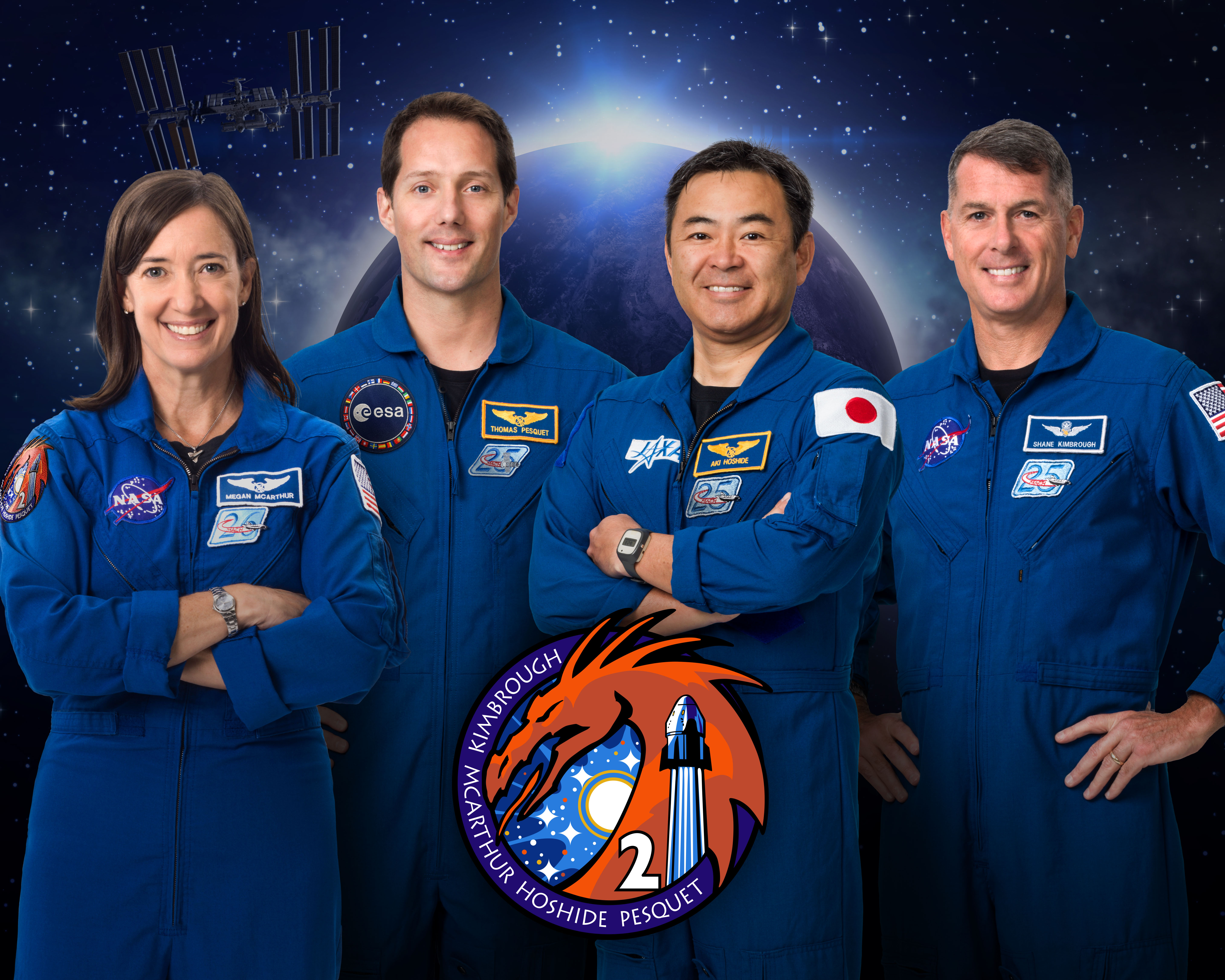
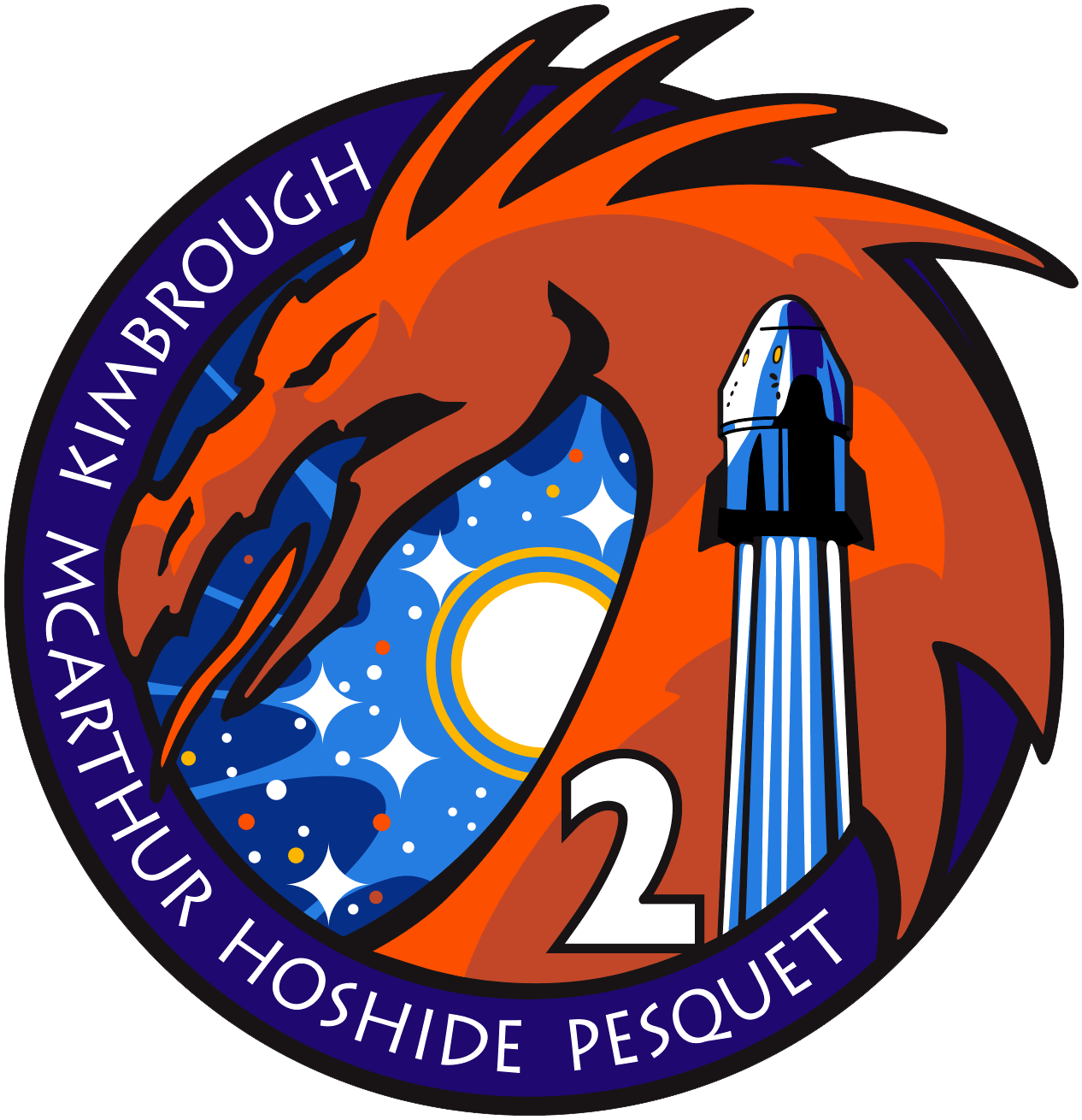
- From top to bottom, left to right: NASA, SpaceX, JAXA, and ESA mission patches From left: McArthur, Pesquet, Hoshide and Kimbrough Commercial Crew Program Crew Dragon flights

SpaceX Crew-2 was the second operational flight of a Crew Dragon spacecraft, and the third overall crewed orbital flight of the Commercial Crew Program. The mission was launched on April 23, 2021, at 09:49:02 UTC, and docked to the International Space Station on April 24 at 09:08 UTC.

SpaceX Crew-2 used the same capsule as Crew Dragon Demo-2 (Endeavour) and launched on the same Falcon 9 booster as SpaceX Crew-1 (B1061.1).

With its return to Earth the evening of November 9, 2021, the mission set a record for the longest spaceflight by a U.S. crewed spacecraft with a mission duration of 199 days before being surpassed by SpaceX Crew-8 with a mission duration of 235 days respectively.

== Crew ==
On July 28, 2020, JAXA, ESA, and NASA confirmed their astronaut assignments aboard this mission.

Prime crew
Position	Astronaut
Commander	Shane Kimbrough, NASA; Expedition 65/66; Third and last spaceflight
Pilot	K. Megan McArthur, NASA; Expedition 65/66; Second and last spaceflight
Mission specialist	Akihiko Hoshide, JAXA; Expedition 65/66; Third spaceflight
Mission specialist	Thomas Pesquet, ESA; Expedition 65/66; Second spaceflight

Backup crew
Position	Astronaut
Mission specialist	Satoshi Furukawa, JAXA
Mission specialist	Matthias Maurer, ESA

German astronaut Matthias Maurer was the backup for Pesquet, while Japanese astronaut Satoshi Furukawa trained as backup to Hoshide.

== Mission ==
The second SpaceX operational mission in the Commercial Crew Program launched on April 23, 2021. The Crew Dragon Endeavour docked to the International Docking Adapter (IDA) at the forward port of the Harmony module. This was the first mission with astronauts on board to use a previously flown booster launch vehicle.

All crew members were veteran astronauts, though this was Megan McArthur's first visit to the ISS (as her first spaceflight was STS-125, a mission to the Hubble Space Telescope). McArthur used the same seat on the Crew Dragon Endeavour which her husband, Bob Behnken, used on the Demo-2 mission. Akihiko Hoshide served as the second Japanese ISS commander during his stay. It was the second mission by Thomas Pesquet to the International Space Station and was named Alpha, after Alpha Centauri, the closest star system to Earth.

To prepare for the arrival of a Starliner, the Endeavour docked to ISS at Harmony forward port was undocked at 10:45 UTC and relocated to Harmony zenith port on July 21, 2021, at 11:36 UTC.

With CRS-23, (C208) and Inspiration4 (Resilience), three Dragon spacecraft were in space at the same time, from September 16 to 18, 2021 (UTC).

=== Timeline ===
MET	Time		Date (UTC)	Event
MET	EDT	UTC	Date (UTC)	Event
−6:40:00	11:09:00 PM	03:09:00	April 23 2021	Crew wake
−05:30:00	0:19:02 AM	04:19:02	April 23 2021	CE launch readiness briefing
−05:00:00	0:49:02 AM	04:49:02	April 23 2021	Launch shift on console
−04:59:59	0:49:03 AM	04:49:03	April 23 2021	Dragon IMU align and configure for launch.
−04:30:00	1:19:02 AM	04:19:02	April 23 2021	Dragon propellant pressurization
−04:20:00	1:29:02 AM	04:29:02	April 23 2021	Crew weather brief
−04:10:00	1:39:02 AM	05:39:02	April 23 2021	Crew handoff
−04:00:00	1:49:02 AM	05:49:02	April 23 2021	Suit donning and checkouts
−03:20:00	2:29:02 AM	05:29:02	April 23 2021	Crew walk out of Neil Armstrong Operations and Checkout Building
−03:15:00	2:34:02 AM	05:34:02	April 23 2021	Crew transportation to Launch Complex 39A (LC-39A) by Tesla Model X with "RECYCLE" license plate
−02:55:00	2:54:02 AM	06:54:02	April 23 2021	Crew arrives at pad
−02:35:00	3:14:02 AM	07:14:02	April 23 2021	Crew ingress
−02:20:00	3:29:02 AM	07:29:02	April 23 2021	Communication check
−02:15:00	3:34:02 AM	07:34:02	April 23 2021	Verify ready for seat rotation
−02:14:00	3:35:02 AM	07:35:02	April 23 2021	Suit leak checks
−01:55:00	3:54:02 AM	07:54:02	April 23 2021	Hatch close
−01:10:00	4:39:02 AM	08:39:02	April 23 2021	ISS state upload to Dragon
−00:45:00	5:04:02 AM	09:04:02	April 23 2021	SpaceX launch director verifies go for propellant load
−00:42:00	5:07:02 AM	09:07:02	April 23 2021	Crew access arm retracts
−00:38:00	5:11:02 AM	09:11:02	April 23 2021	Dragon launch escape system is armed.
−00:35:00	5:14:02 AM	09:14:02	April 23 2021	RP-1 (rocket grade kerosene) loading begins; 1st stage LOX (liquid oxygen) loading begins.
−00:16:00	5:33:02 AM	09:33:02	April 23 2021	2nd stage LOX loading begins.
−00:07:00	5:42:02 AM	09:42:02	April 23 2021	Falcon 9 begins engine chill prior to launch.
−00:05:00	5:44:02 AM	09:44:02	April 23 2021	Dragon transitions to internal power
−00:01:00	5:48:02 AM	09:48:02	April 23 2021	Command flight computer to begin final prelaunch checks; propellant tank pressurization to flight pressure begins.
−00:00:45	5:48:17 AM	09:48:17	April 23 2021	SpaceX launch director verifies go for launch.
−00:00:03	5:48:59 AM	09:48:59	April 23 2021	Engine controller commands Merlin engine ignition sequence to start.
00:00:00	5:49:02 AM	09:49:02	April 23 2021	Liftoff
+00:01:02	5:50:04 AM	09:50:04	April 23 2021	Max Q (moment of peak mechanical stress on the launch vehicle)
+00:02:36	5:51:38 AM	09:51:38	April 23 2021	1st stage main engine cutoff (MECO)
+00:02:39	5:51:41 AM	09:51:41	April 23 2021	1st and 2nd stages separate
+00:02:47	5:51:49 AM	09:51:49	April 23 2021	2nd stage engine starts
+00:07:27	5:56:29 AM	09:56:29	April 23 2021	1st stage entry burn
+00:08:47	5:57:49 AM	09:57:49	April 23 2021	2nd stage engine cutoff (SECO-1)
+00:09:03	5:58:05 AM	09:58:05	April 23 2021	1st stage landing burn
+00:09:30	5:58:32 AM	09:58:32	April 23 2021	1st stage landing
+00:11:58	6:01:00 AM	10:01:00	April 23 2021	Crew Dragon separates from 2nd stage
+00:13:02	6:02:04 AM	10:02:04	April 23 2021	Dragon nosecone open sequence begins
+1/	3:31 AM	07:31	April 24 2021	Dragon starts the final phase of the approach to the ISS.
+1/03:33	05:08 AM	09:08	April 24 2021	Soft capture to the ISS.
+1/03:33	05:20 AM	09:20	April 24 2021	Dragon docked to the ISS.
+1/05:34	7:15 AM	11:15	April 24 2021	Hatch opened.

== Wake-up calls ==
NASA began a tradition of playing music to astronauts during the Gemini program, and first used music to wake up a flight crew during Gemini 6; the first song was Hello, Dolly. Each track is specially chosen, often by the astronauts' families, and usually has a special meaning to an individual member of the crew, or is applicable to their daily activities.

Flight Day	Song	Artist	Played for	Links
Day 2	An off-key, all flute comedic cover of A-Ha's "Take On Me", made by YouTube artist "Shittyflute".	A-ha (original); Shittyflute (Cover)	Thomas Pesquet	

== Return ==
Due to weather delays and a minor health problem with one of the SpaceX Crew-3 astronauts, NASA decided to bring home the Crew-2 astronauts from the ISS before launching Crew-3, thus being the first Crew Dragon indirect handover of space station crews. The Crew Dragon undocked from the station at 19:05 UTC on November 8, 2021, and splashed down off the coast of Florida at 03:33 UTC on November 9, 2021. One of four parachutes deployed slower than the others.

== Gallery ==
SpaceX Crew-2
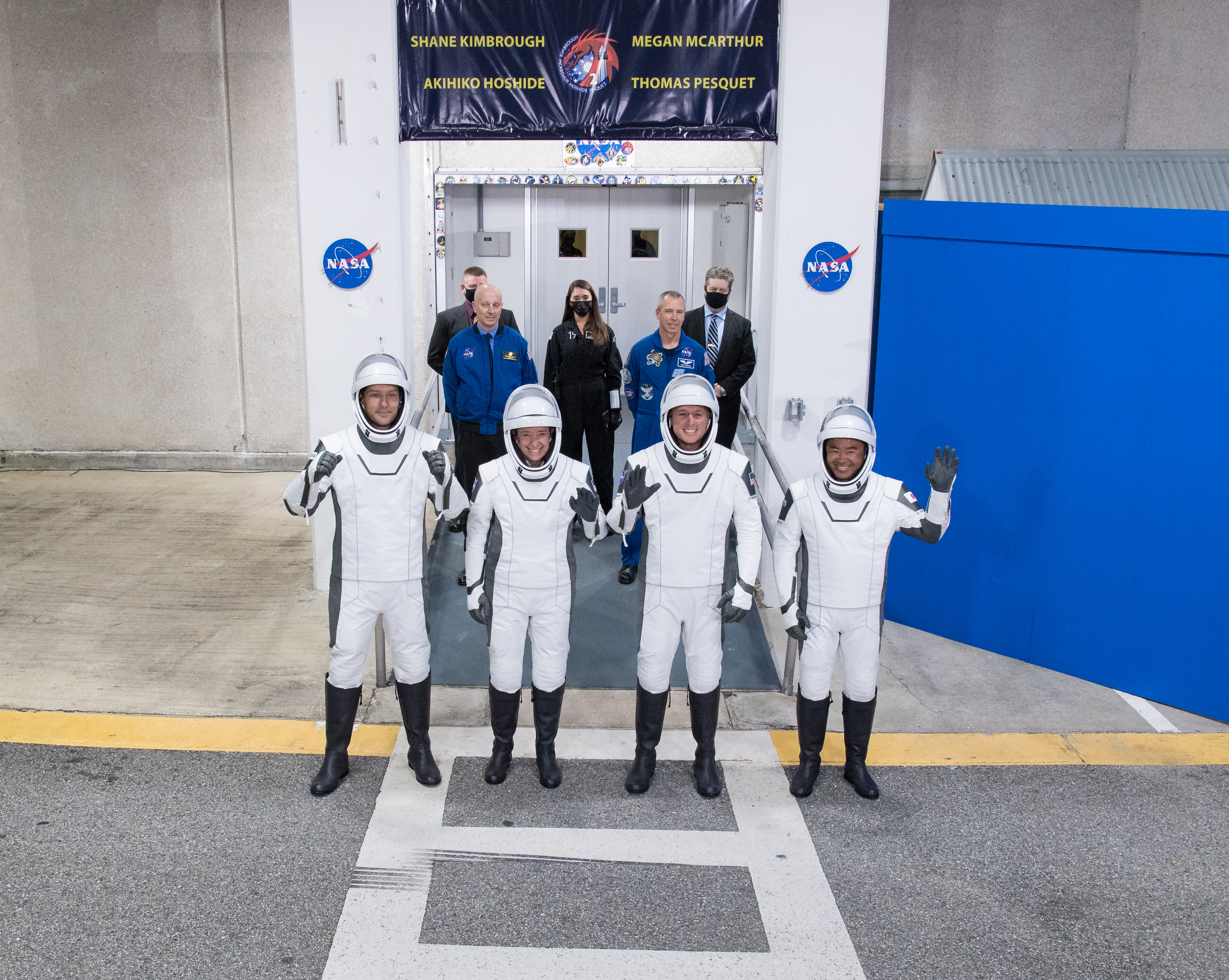
Crew-2 astronauts walk out from the O&C Building

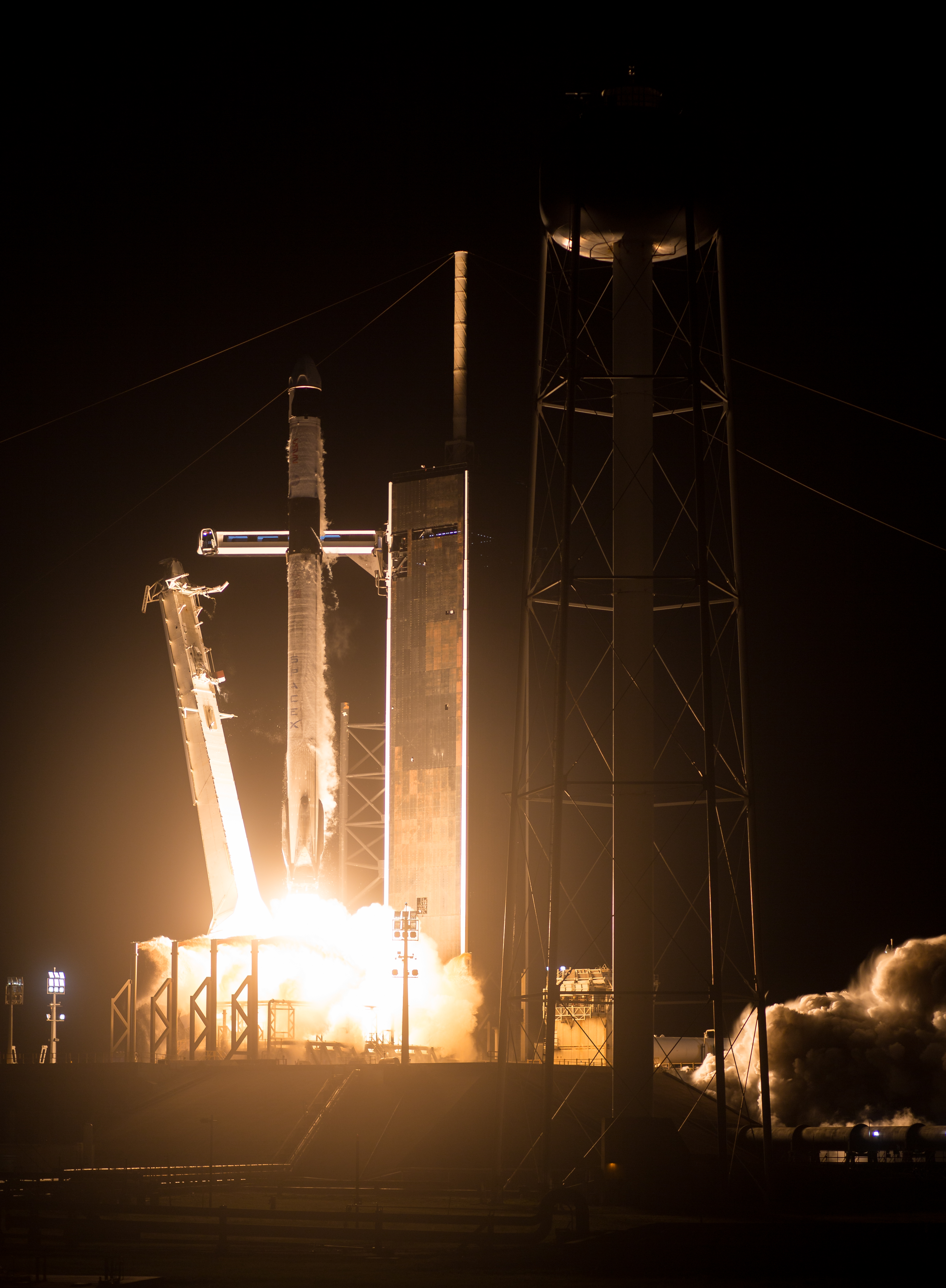
Launch of Crew-2

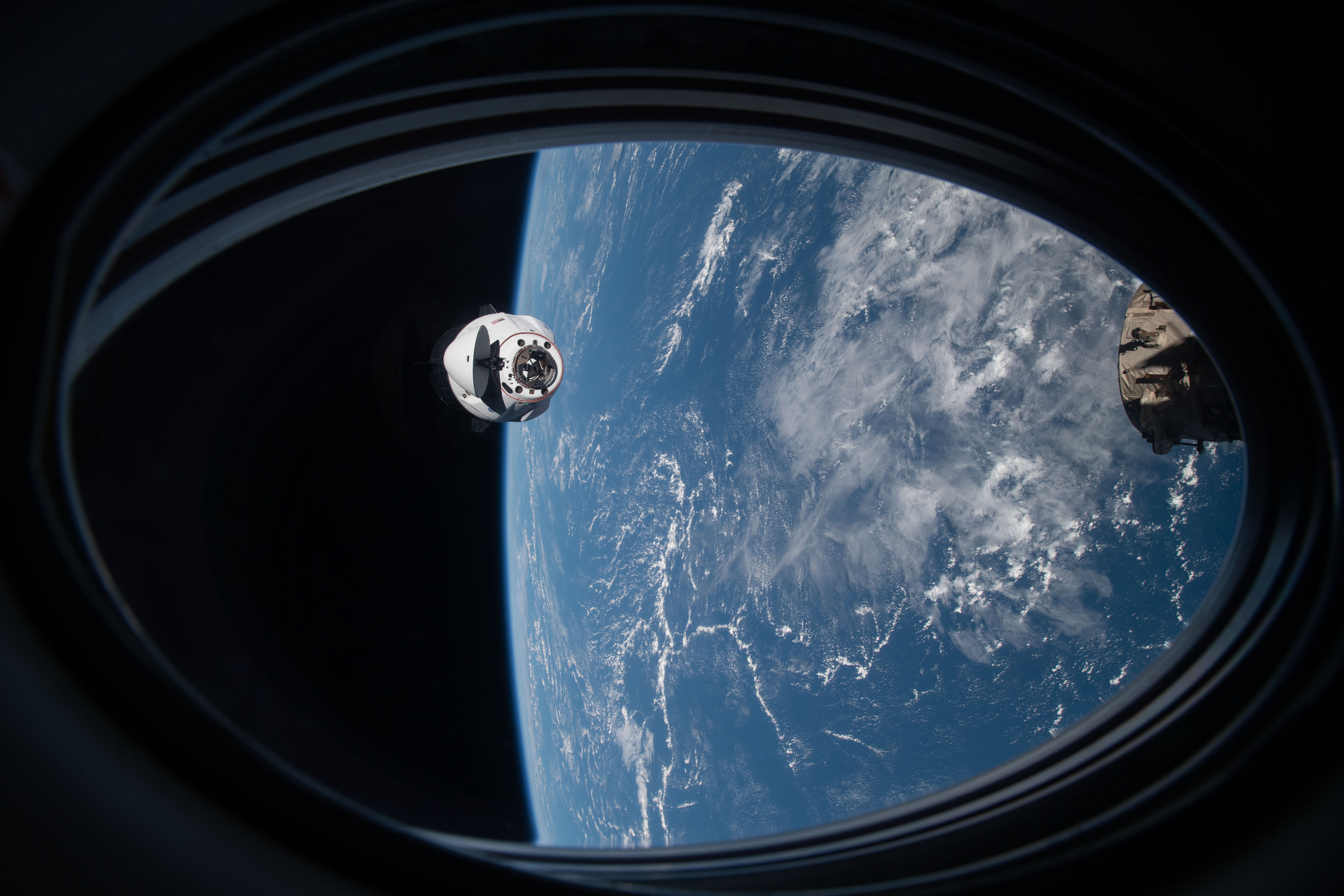
Crew Dragon Endeavour approaching the ISS

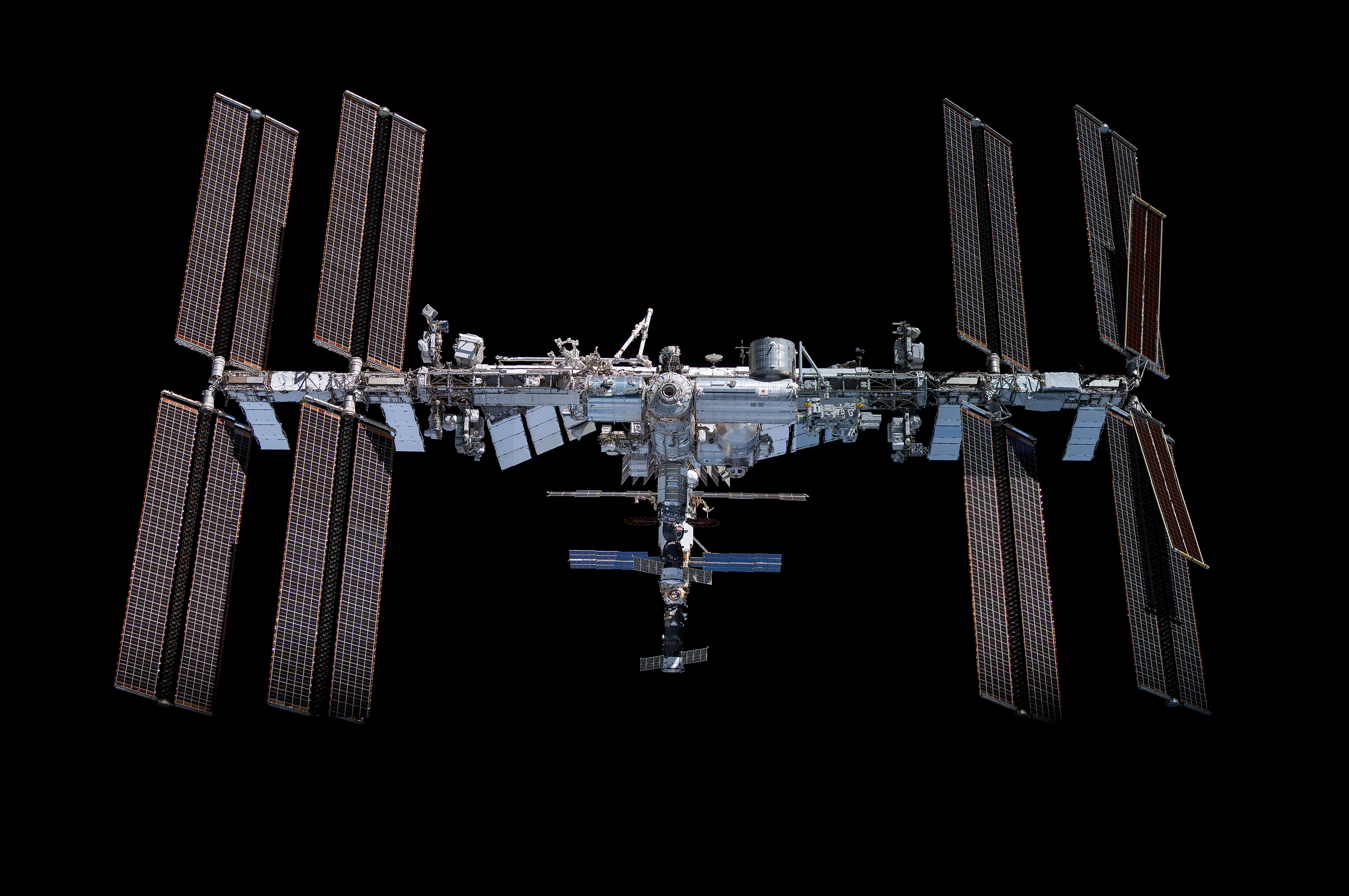
View of the ISS from Endeavour

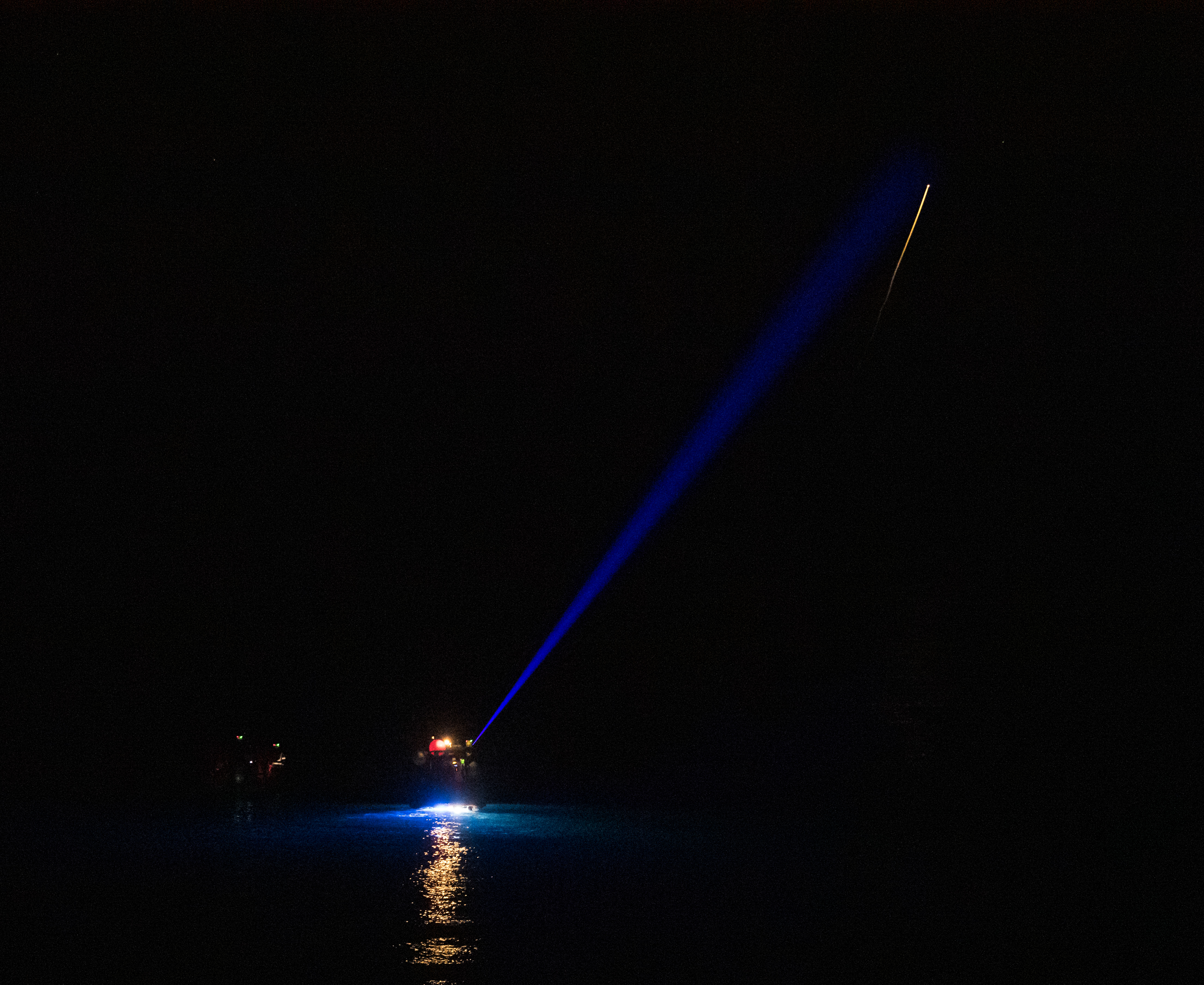
Crew-2 reentering the atmosphere

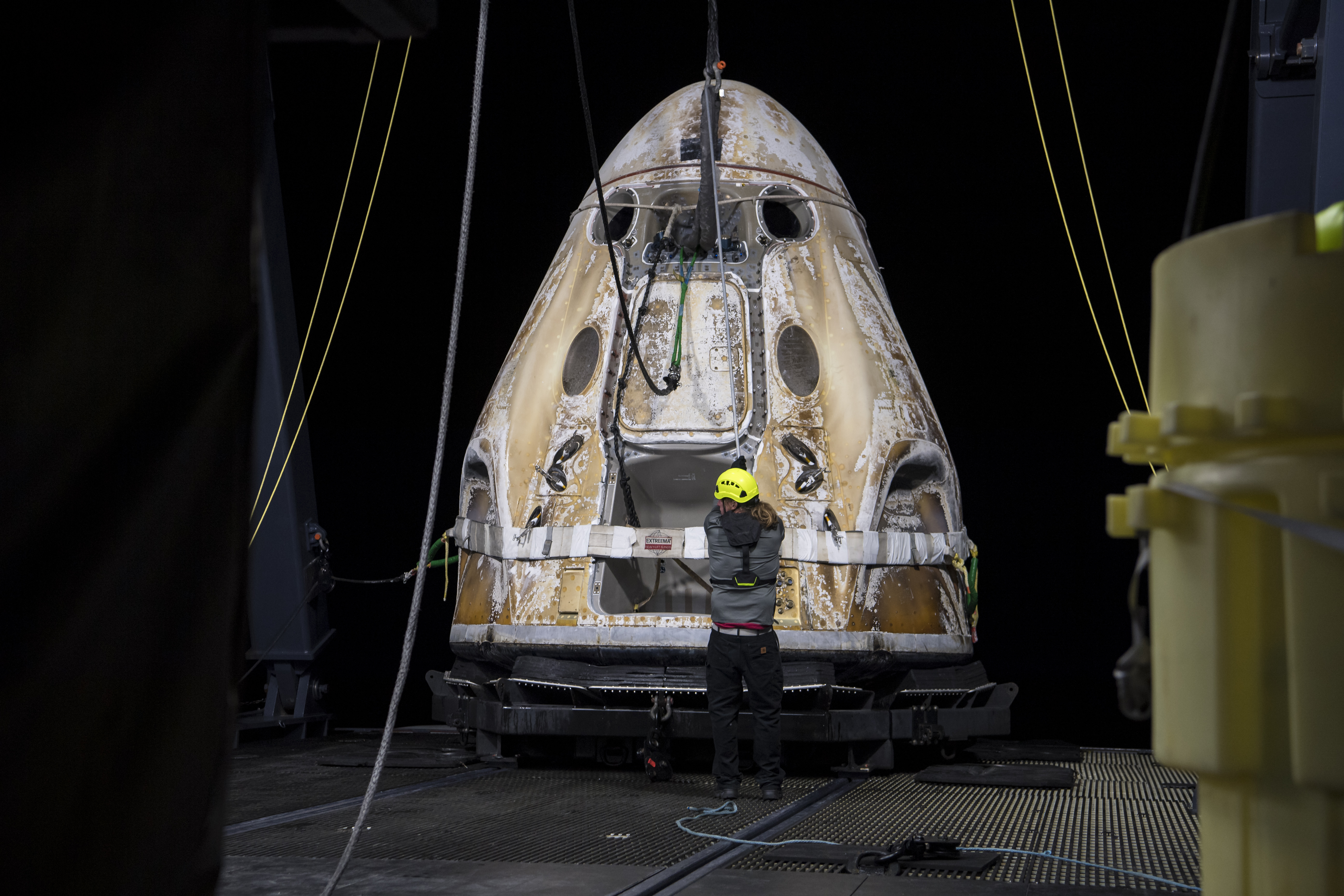
Crew Dragon Endeavour on MV GO Navigator after splashdown

== See also ==
- Crew Dragon Endeavour
- Boeing Starliner
