= My Father's Dragon (1997 film) =

- VHS cover
- Directed by: Masami Hata
- Written by: Kenji Terada (screenplay); Ruth Stiles Gannett (novel)
- Music by: Naoto Kine
- Production company: Aubec
- Distributed by: Shochiku
- Release date: July 5, 1997
- Running time: 98 minutes
- Country: Japan
- Language: Japanese

My Father's Dragon (エルマーの冒険, Erumā no Bōken; lit. "Elmer's Adventure") is a 1997 Japanese animated film based on the My Father's Dragon children's books by Ruth Stiles Gannett and their illustrations by Ruth Chrisman Gannett.

== Cast ==
- Elmer Elevator: Yu-ki (TRF)
- Boris the Dragon: Megumi Hayashibara
- Cat: Jōji Yanami
- Male Gorilla: Daisuke Gōri
- Nearsighted Rat: Masako Nozawa
- Lion: Katsuhisa Namase
- Lioness: Sumiko Sakamoto
- Elmer's Mother: Maiko Kikuchi
- Elmer's Father: Masahiro Takashima
- Seagull: Naoki Tatsuta
- Wild Boars: Kazuki Yao, Bin Shimada
- Rhino: Yusaku Yara
- Tigers: Banjō Ginga, Ikuya Sawaki, Masaharu Satō, Kōzō Shioya, Kenyu Horiuchi
- Rōjī: Chiaki
- Rōdā: Ikuko Takeuchi
- Female Gorilla: Hiroko Emori
- Alligators: Masato Amada, Hirohiko Kakegawa
- Store Owner: Kazumi Tanaka
- Rachel: Junichi Sugawara
- Roberta: Takumi Yamazaki
- Lucy: Makiko Ōmoto

== Staff ==
- Distribution: Shochiku
- Director: Masami Hata
- Executive Producer: Shunji Yoshida
- Production Heads: Kazuyoshi Okuyama, Masatoshi Sakai
- Producers: Satoshi Nagashima, Minami Kishimoto
- Original Story: Ruth Stiles Gannett
- Screenplay: Kenji Terada
- Planning: Yūji Tanitabe, Hideki Higuchi, Fumio Sameshima
- Supervising Animation Director: Yutaka Arai
- Character Design: Shūichi Seki
- Cinematography: Hideki Imaizumi
- Special Effects: Yoshio Kihara
- Art Director: Minoru Nishida
- Editor: Hajime Okayasu
- Music: Naoto Kine
- Music Supervisor: Tetsuya Komuro

== Theme songs ==
Dragons' Dance
Opening theme by Yu-ki
Lyrics by Tetsuya Komuro, Marc
Composed by Tetsuya Komuro
If You Wish…
Ending theme by Takashi Utsunomiya
Lyrics by Marc
Composed by Tetsuya Komuro

== Releases ==
=== Albums ===
Elmer no Bōken Original Soundtrack
Released 1997-07-21, 34 tracks, CD, Sony Music Entertainment

=== Video ===
Elmer no Bōken
Released 1998-12-05 (both limited and regular), color, VHS (NTSC), Shochiku

== See also ==
- List of animated feature-length films
