= TRF (group) =

Japanese pop group

- Origin: Japan
- Genres: J-pop; rave; techno; house
- Years active: 1992–present
- Label: Avex Trax
- Members: DJ KOO; SAM; ETSU; YU-KI; CHIHARU
- Website: Official website

TRF (an abbreviation of TK Rave Factory) is a Japanese pop band. Its members are DJ Koo, Sam, Etsu, Yu-ki and Chiharu.

== History ==
The band debuted as "trf" in 1993. From 1994 to 1995, the band released five singles produced by Tetsuya Komuro, each selling over a million copies under the Avex record label. In 1995, their song "Overnight Sensation: Jidai wa Anata ni Yudaneteru" received a Japan Record Award.

The following year, the band changed their name to an all-capital "TRF" with their single "Hey! Ladies & Gentlemen".

Yu-ki did voice acting for the children's animation movie Elmer's Adventure: My Father's Dragon, for which she sang the opening theme song as well. She also performed the opening song to the 2006 Tokusatsu series Kamen Rider Kabuto as well as several variants of it.

Chiharu worked on the choreography for J-pop singer Shizuka Kudō, and appeared in a drama as herself.

Sam was married to popstar and protégé of Tetsuya Komuro, Namie Amuro, in 1997, who was three months pregnant with his child at the time, but the couple were divorced in 2002, due to irreconcilable differences. Amuro had full custody of their son, Haruto Maruyama.

The song "Lights and Any More" was used as opening theme of the anime Wangan Midnight, and their song Silence Whispers was used as the second ending theme for the anime Black Jack 21. A remix of their song "Boy Meets Girl" was used in 2000 as the first season ending theme of the anime UFO Baby, and in 2013 it was covered by the group Prizmmy as the opening theme for the series Pretty Rhythm: Rainbow Live.

TRF's 20th anniversary was in February 2013. They announced that they would be releasing something new every month, starting from November 2012.

== Discography ==
=== Singles ===
	Release date	title	Sales model	Standard number	Original content ranking	First album
trf
1st	25 February 1993	GOING 2 DANCE/OPEN YOUR MIND	8cmCD	AVDD-20036	-	trf 〜THIS IS THE TRUTH〜
1st	20 November 2006	GOING 2 DANCE/OPEN YOUR MIND	12cmCD	AVCD-31098	-	trf 〜THIS IS THE TRUTH〜
2nd	21 June 1993	EZ Do Dance	8cmCD	AVDD-20042	15	EZ DO DANCE
2nd	29 November 2006	EZ Do Dance	12cmCD	AVCD-31099	15	EZ DO DANCE
3rd	21 November 1993	愛がもう少し欲しいよ	8cmCD	AVDD-20060	29	WORLD GROOVE
3rd	29 November 2006	愛がもう少し欲しいよ	12cmCD	AVCD-31100	29	WORLD GROOVE
4th	21 November 1993	Silver and Gold dance	8cmCD	AVDD-20061	24	WORLD GROOVE
4th	29 November 2006	Silver and Gold dance	12cmCD	AVCD-31101	24	WORLD GROOVE
5th	16 December 1993	寒い夜だから...	8cmCD	AVDD-20062	8	WORLD GROOVE
5th	21 November 1994	寒い夜だから...	8cmCD	AVDD-20062	8	WORLD GROOVE
5th	29 November 2006	寒い夜だから...	12cmCD	AVCD-31102	8	WORLD GROOVE
6th	25 May 1994	survival dAnce 〜no no cry more〜	8cmCD	AVDD-20070	1	BILLIONAIRE 〜BOY MEETS GIRL〜
6th	29 November 2006	survival dAnce 〜no no cry more〜	12cmCD	AVCD-31103	1	BILLIONAIRE 〜BOY MEETS GIRL〜
7th	22 June 1994	BOY MEETS GIRL	8cmCD	AVDD-20080	3	BILLIONAIRE 〜BOY MEETS GIRL〜
7th	29 November 2006	BOY MEETS GIRL	12cmCD	AVCD-31104	3	BILLIONAIRE 〜BOY MEETS GIRL〜
8th	1 January 1995	Crazy Gonna Crazy	8cmCD	AVDD-20082	1	dAnce to positive
8th	29 November 2006	Crazy Gonna Crazy	12cmCD	AVCD-31105	1	dAnce to positive
9th	1 February 1995	masquerade	8cmCD	AVDD-20083	1	dAnce to positive
9th	29 November 2006	masquerade	12cmCD	AVCD-31106	1	dAnce to positive
10th	8 March 1995	Overnight Sensation 〜時代はあなたに委ねてる〜	8cmCD	AVDD-20084	1	dAnce to positive
10th	29 November 2006	Overnight Sensation 〜時代はあなたに委ねてる〜	12cmCD	AVCD-31107	1	dAnce to positive
11th	25 October 1995	BRAND NEW TOMORROW	8cmCD	AVDD-20105	1	BRAND NEW TOMORROW
11th	29 November 2006	BRAND NEW TOMORROW	12cmCD	AVCD-31108	1	BRAND NEW TOMORROW
12th	11 December 1995	Happening Here/teens	8cmCD	AVDD-20116	3	BRAND NEW TOMORROW
12th	29 November 2006	Happening Here/teens	12cmCD	AVCD-31109	3	BRAND NEW TOMORROW
13th	21 March 1995	Love & Peace Forever	8cmCD	AVDD-20121	2	WORKS -THE BEST OF TRF-
13th	29 November 2006	Love & Peace Forever	12cmCD -	AVCD-31110	2	WORKS -THE BEST OF TRF-
TRF
14th	12 June 1996	Hey! Ladies & Gentlemen	8cmCD	AVDD-20134	4	WORKS -THE BEST OF TRF-
14th	29 November 2006	Hey! Ladies & Gentlemen	12cmCD	AVCD-31111	4	WORKS -THE BEST OF TRF-
15th	24 July 2006	BRAVE STORY	8cmCD	AVDD-20130	4	WORKS -THE BEST OF TRF-
15th	29 November 2006	BRAVE STORY	12cmCD	AVCD-31112	4	WORKS -THE BEST OF TRF-
16th	6 November 1996	SILENT NIGHT	8cmCD	AVDD-20152	5	WORKS -THE BEST OF TRF-
16th	29 November 2006	SILENT NIGHT	12cmCD	AVCD-31113	5	WORKS -THE BEST OF TRF-
17th	11 December 1996	LEGEND OF WIND	8cmCD	AVDD-20170	4	WORKS -THE BEST OF TRF-
17th	29 November 2006	LEGEND OF WIND	12cmCD	AVCD-31114	4	WORKS -THE BEST OF TRF-
18th	18 February 1998	Unite! The Night!	8cmCD	AVDD-20226	8	UNITE
18th	29 November 2006	Unite! The Night!	12cmCD -	AVCD-31115	8	UNITE
19th	25 March 1998	Frame	8cmCD	AVDD-20235	5	UNITE
19th	29 November 2006	Frame	12cmCD	AVCD-31116	5	UNITE
20th	29 April 1998	TRY OR CRY	8cmCD	AVDD-20247	18	UNITE
20th	29 November 2006	TRY OR CRY	12cmCD	AVCD-31117	18	UNITE
21st	23 September 1998	BE FREE	8cmCD	AVDD-20262	16	LOOP#1999
21st	29 November 2006	BE FREE	12cmCD	AVCD-31118	16	LOOP#1999
22nd	5 November 1998	embrace/slug and soul	8cmCD	AVDD-20277	19	LOOP#1999
22nd	29 November 2006	embrace/slug and soul	12cmCD	AVCD-31119	19	LOOP#1999
23rd	3 February 1999	JOY	8cmCD	AVDD-20295	30	LOOP#1999
23rd	29 November 2006	JOY	12cmCD	AVCD-31120	30	LOOP#1999
24th	21 April 1999	WIRED	8cmCD	AVDD-20302	30	LOOP#1999
24th	29 November 2006	WIRED	12cmCD	AVCD-31121	30	LOOP#1999
25th	25 August 1999	HE LIVES IN YOU	12cmCD	AVCD-30048	40	LOOP#1999
26th	18 January 2006	Where to begin	CD+DVD	AVCD-30886	18	Lif-e-Motions
26th	18 January 2006	Where to begin	CD	AVCD-30887	18	Lif-e-Motions
27th	30 August 2006	Silence whispers	CD+DVD	AVCD-31002	40	TRF 15th Anniversary BEST -MEMORIES-
27th	30 August 2006	Silence whispers	CD	AVCD-31003	40	TRF 15th Anniversary BEST -MEMORIES-
28th	29 November 2006	We are all BLOOMIN'	CD+DVD	AVCD-31094	19	TRF 15th Anniversary BEST -MEMORIES-
28th	29 November 2006	We are all BLOOMIN'	CD	AVCD-31095	19	TRF 15th Anniversary BEST -MEMORIES-
29th	17 October 2007	iNNOVATiON	CD+DVD	AVCD-31295	28	GRAVITY
29th	17 October 2007	iNNOVATiON	CD	AVCD-31296	28	GRAVITY
30th	23 April 2008	Live Your Days	CD+DVD	AVCD-31403	49	GRAVITY
30th	23 April 2008	Live Your Days	CD	AVCD-31404	49	GRAVITY
31st	21 January 2009	Memorial Snow/CLOSURE	CD+DVD	AVCD-31476	37	GRAVITY
31st	21 January 2009	Memorial Snow/CLOSURE	CD	AVCD-31477	37	GRAVITY

==== Remix singles ====
	Release date	Title	Sales model	Standard number	Original content ranking	First album
TRF
1st	23 March 2000	Burst drive Mix [Unite! the Night! (SOUL SOLUTION MIX)]	CD	AVCD-30103		Burst drive mix -album- non stop mixed by DJ KOO
2nd	31 May 2000	Burst drive Mix -2nd mix- [Samui Yoru Dakara (SHARP BOYS UK VOCAL MIX)]	CD	AVCD-30110		Burst drive mix -album- non stop mixed by DJ KOO
3rd	26 July 2000	Burst drive Mix -3rd mix- [It's MY TIME (SOUL SOLUTION MIX)]	CD	AVCD-30112		Burst drive mix -album- non stop mixed by DJ KOO
4th	20 September 2000	Burst drive Mix -4th mix- [Brave Story (JHONATHAN PETERS MIX)]	CD	AVCD-30131		Burst drive mix -album- non stop mixed by DJ KOO
5th	22 November 2000	Burst drive Mix -5th mix- [Silver and Gold dance (THUNDERPUSS MIX)]	CD	AVCD-30154		Burst drive mix -album- non stop mixed by DJ KOO
Various Artists (SUPER EUROBEAT)
-	23 August 2000	「だぁ!だぁ!だあ!」SEB プレゼンツ BOY MEETS GIRL with TRF	CD	AVDD-20354		

==== Digital singles ====
Release date	Title	First album
18 July 2007	survival dAnce '07	
18 July 2007	BOY MEETS GIRL '07	
18 July 2007	FUNKY M '07	
11 February 2009	lights and any more	GRAVITY
2 August 2010	survival dAnce feat. DABO & JAMOSA 〜reborn〜	TRF TRIBUTE ALBUM BEST
2 August 2010	BOY MEETS GIRL feat. WISE 〜reborn〜	TRF TRIBUTE ALBUM BEST
2 August 2010	EZ DO DANCE retracked by Yasutaka Nakata (capsule)	TRF TRIBUTE ALBUM BEST
19 January 2011	寒い夜だから... feat. INFINITY16 & GOKIGEN SOUND	TRF TRIBUTE ALBUM BEST
30 January 2013	PUSH YOUR BACK	WATCH THE MUSIC
16 December 2018	Get Wild -live ver.-	
16 December 2018	LET ME GO MY WAY feat. Daisuke Asakura	
22 March 2023	EZ DO DANCE -Version.2023-	TRF 30th Anniversary "past and future" Premium Edition
20 March 2024	TRy the future	TRF 30th Anniversary "past and future" Premium Edition

=== Albums ===
	Release date	Title	Sales model	Standard number	Original content ranking
trf
1st	25 February 1993	trf 〜THIS IS THE TRUTH〜	CD	AVCD-11102	14
2nd	21 July 1993	EZ DO DANCE	CD	AVCD-11128	4
3rd	9 February 1994	WORLD GROOVE	CD	AVCD-11183	1
4th	27 July 1994	BILLIONAIRE 〜BOY MEETS GIRL〜	CD	AVCD-11230	1
5th	27 Match 1995	dAnce to positive	CD	AVCD-11288	1
6th	11 December 1995	BRAND NEW TOMORROW	CD	AVCD-11354	2
TRF
7th	20 May 1998	UNITE	CD	AVCD-11645	4
8th	19 May 1999	LOOP#1999	CD	AVCD-11723	5
9th	15 February 2006	Lif-e-Motions	2CD+DVD	AVCD-17858	8
9th	15 February 2006	Lif-e-Motions	2CD	AVCD-17860	8
10th	11 February 2009	GRAVITY	CD+DVD	AVCD-23754	42
10th	11 February 2009	GRAVITY	CD	AVCD-23755	42

==== EPs ====
Release date	Title	Sales model	Standard number	Original content ranking
trf
25 February 2013	WATCH THE MUSIC	CD+DVD	AVCD-38579/B	42
25 February 2013	WATCH THE MUSIC	CD	AVCD-38580	42

==== Remix albums ====
	Release date	Title	Sales model	Standard number	Original content ranking
trf
1st	21 May 1993	HYPER TECHNO MIX	CD	AVCD-11122	
2nd	21 Ougust 1993	HYPER TECHNO MIX II	CD	AVCD-11153	
3rd	27 April 1994	HYPER MIX III	CD	AVCD-11200	1
4th	21 June 1995	hyper mix 4	CD	AVCD-11313	2
TRF
5th	27 December 2000	Burst drive mix -album- non stop mixed by DJ KOO	CD	AVCD-11879	
	23 Marth 2011	J-POPハリケーン 〜TRFだけ60分本気MIX〜 /MIX-J	CD	AVCD-38286	
	27 Marth 2013	DJ KOO 〜TRF 20th Anniversary Non-stop mix	CD	AVC6-38659	

==== Best-of compilation albums ====
	Release date	Title	Sales model	Standard number	Original content ranking
TRF
1st	1 January 1998	WORKS -THE BEST OF TRF-	2CD	AVCD-11633	1
1st	28 January 2004	WORKS -THE BEST OF TRF-	DVD-Audio	AVAD-91201	
2nd	7 February 2007	TRF 15th Anniversary BEST -MEMORIES-	3CD+3DVD	AVCD-23167	6
2nd	7 February 2007	TRF 15th Anniversary BEST -MEMORIES-	2CD+2DVD	AVCD-23170	6
2nd	7 February 2007	TRF 15th Anniversary BEST -MEMORIES-	2CD	AVCD-23172	6
	30 June 2007	Complete Best TRF Vol.1	CD	AQC1-50265	
	30 June 2007	Complete Best TRF Vol.2	CD	AQC1-50266	
3rd	21 November 2013	TRF 20TH Anniversary COMPLETE SINGLE BEST	3CD+DVD	AVCD-38635	21
3rd	21 November 2013	TRF 20TH Anniversary COMPLETE SINGLE BEST	3CD	AVCD-38638	21
4th	25 December 2013	BEST SINGLE Collection × EZ DO DANCERCIZE	CD+DVD	AVCD-38886	
		TRF BEST OF BEST	CD	AQC1-77433	
5th	20 February 2024	TRF 30th Anniversary "past and future" Premium Edition	3CD+3Blu-ray	AVCD-63558~60/B~D	

==== Other albums ====
	Release date	Title	Sales model	Standard number
Plan	21 October 1994	PRESET SOUND	2CD	AVCD-11260
Live	21 February 1996	THE LIVE^{3}	3CD	AVCD-11408〜10
Plan		Live-Dio meets trf our dance camp	CD	
	19 December 2012	TRFリスペクトアイドルトリビュート!!	CD+DVD	AVCD-38660
	19 December 2012	TRFリスペクトアイドルトリビュート!!	CD	AVCD-38661
	13 Marth 2013	TRF TRIBUTE ALBUM BEST	2CD	AVCD-38676/7
	27 Marth 2013	VOCALOID3 meets TRF / VRF	2CD	AVCD-38678
	2 December 2015	TRF 〜Hi-Res Best〜	Digital download	
	2 December 2015	TRF 〜Hi-Res Selection〜	Digital download	

=== Not released in Japan ===
==== Singles ====
Title
BOY MEETS GIRL
寒い夜だから...
CRAZY GONNA CRAZY
survival dAnce 〜no no cry more〜
WORLD GROOVE '96
EZ DO DANCE '96

==== Albums ====
Title
BILLIONAIRE '96
dAnce to positive
BRAND NEW TOMORROW
MEGA MIXES

=== Videography ===
==== Music videos ====
	Release date	Title	Sales model	Standard number	Original content ranking
trf
1st	26 September 1994	WORLD GROOVE	VHS	AVVD-90007	
1st	29 March 2000	WORLD GROOVE	DVD	AVBD-91002	
1st	29 November 2006	WORLD GROOVE	DVD	AVBD-91431	
2nd	21 June 1995	ULTIMATE FILMS 1994-1995	VHS	AVVD-90015	
2nd	29 March 2000	ULTIMATE FILMS 1994-1995	DVD	AVBD-91004	
2nd	29 November 2006	ULTIMATE FILMS 1994-1995	DVD	AVBD-91433	
TRF
3rd	11 December 2002	VIDEO CLIPS	DVD	AVBD-91127	

==== Live videos ====
	Release date	Title	Sales model	Standard number	Original content ranking
trf
1st	16 December 1994	TOUR '94 BILLIONAIRE 〜BOY MEETS GIRL〜	VHS	AVVD-90010	
1st	29 March 2000	TOUR '94 BILLIONAIRE 〜BOY MEETS GIRL〜	DVD	AVBD-91003	
1st	29 November 2006	TOUR '94 BILLIONAIRE 〜BOY MEETS GIRL〜	DVD	AVBD-91432	
2nd	22 November 1995	TOUR'95 dAnce to positive Overnight Sensation	VHS	AVVD-90021	
2nd	29 March 2000	TOUR'95 dAnce to positive Overnight Sensation	DVD	AVBD-91005	
2nd	29 November 2006	TOUR'95 dAnce to positive Overnight Sensation	DVD	AVBD-91434	
3rd	21 February 1996	BRAND NEW TOMORROW in TOKYO DOME -Presentation for 1996-	VHS	AVVD-90022	
3rd	29 March 2000	BRAND NEW TOMORROW in TOKYO DOME -Presentation for 1996-	DVD	AVBD-91006	
3rd	29 November 2006	BRAND NEW TOMORROW in TOKYO DOME -Presentation for 1996-	DVD	AVBD-91435	
TRF
4th	30 April 1997	LIVE in YOKOHAMA ARENA	VHS	AVVD-90031	
4th	29 March 2000	LIVE in YOKOHAMA ARENA	DVD	AVBD-91007	
4th	29 November 2006	LIVE in YOKOHAMA ARENA	DVD	AVBD-91436	
5th	17 September 1998	TOUR '98 Live in Unite!	VHS	AVVD-90046	
5th	29 March 2000	TOUR '98 Live in Unite!	DVD	AVBD-91008	
5th	29 November 2006	TOUR '98 Live in Unite!	DVD	AVBD-91437	
6th	15 December 1999	TOUR 1999 exicoast tour at OSAKA	VHS	AVVD-90067	
6th	29 March 2000	TOUR 1999 exicoast tour at OSAKA	DVD	AVBD-91009	
6th	29 November 2006	TOUR 1999 exicoast tour at OSAKA	DVD	AVBD-91438	
7th	30 August 2006	TRF Lif-e-Motions TOUR 2006	DVD	AVBD-91408	
8th	23 April 2008	COMPLETE BEST LIVE from 15th Anniversary Tour -MEMORIES- 2007	DVD	AVBD-91515	
9th	14 August 2013	TRF 20th Anniversary Tour	DVD	AVBD-92035	
9th	14 August 2013	TRF 20th Anniversary Tour	Blu-ray	AVXD-91628	

== See also ==
- List of best-selling music artists in Japan
