= Ruth Stiles Gannett =

American children's writer (1923–2024)

- Born: August 12, 1923; New York City, New York, U.S.
- Died: June 11, 2024 (aged 100)
- Occupation: Writer
- Writing career
- Genre: Children's literature
- Notable works: My Father's Dragon, Elmer and the Dragon, The Dragons of Blueland

Ruth Stiles Gannett Kahn (August 12, 1923 – June 11, 2024) was an American children's writer best known for My Father's Dragon and its two sequels—collectively sometimes called the My Father's Dragon or the Elmer and the Dragons series or trilogy.

== Education ==
Gannett graduated from City and Country School in Greenwich Village, New York City, in the class of 1937. There, she recalled in 2012, "she benefited from being 'allowed and encouraged to write for fun' at certain times of the day". She then attended the George School and Vassar College, graduating with an A.B. in chemistry in 1944.

== Early career ==
After graduating from Vassar, Gannett moved to Boston, where she worked at Boston General Hospital and then at the Massachusetts Radiation Laboratory. She then worked at a ski lodge, and afterward returned to live with her parents, which is where she completed work on her most defining work. In 1947 the year her seminal work was published she married Peter Kahn.

== Writing career ==
Gannett's first novel, My Father's Dragon, was published by Random House in 1948 and was a runner-up for the annual Newbery Medal recognizing the year's "most distinguished contribution" to American children's literature. She wrote two more novels in that series, Elmer and the Dragon and The Dragons of Blueland. The books were illustrated by Ruth Chrisman Gannett, her stepmother, (Note: Ruth Adelaide Chrisman (Arens), December 16, 1896 – December 8, 1979, married her second husband Lewis Stiles Gannett in 1931 and illustrated several of his books. She illustrated Tortilla Flat by John Steinbeck (1935). She was a runner-up for the 1946 Caldecott Medal recognizing her illustration of My Mother is the Most Beautiful Woman in the World, retold by Becky Reyher (Lothrop, 1945), OCLC 225716. (Thirty years later Reyher and Gannett brought and lost an important lawsuit, Reyher v. Children's Television Workshop.) She illustrated Miss Hickory by Carolyn Sherwin Bailey (Viking, 1946), for which Bailey won the 1947 Newbery Medal. She collaborated with her step-daughter Ruth Stiles Gannett.) and the typography was designed by her husband, H. Peter Kahn. They have been translated into fourteen languages.

Gannett wrote two other short children's novels, The Wonderful House-Boat-Train (1949) and Katie and the Sad Noise (1961), illustrated by Fritz Eichenberg and Ellie Simmons.

Kirkus Reviews covered two of the books briefly, showing disappointment in both Gannett's and Eichenberg's work on the house-boat-train and unusual enthusiasm for Gannett's story in a starred review of The Dragons of Blueland.

== Personal life ==
Ruth Gannett married artist, art history professor, and calligrapher H. Peter Kahn (1921–1997). The couple had seven daughters and eight grandchildren at the time of Kahn's death. She lived in Trumansburg, New York, close to Cornell University, where Peter Kahn was employed for forty years. She is the great-granddaughter of Ezra Stiles Gannett. She died on June 11, 2024, at the age of 100.

== Works ==
My Father's Dragon series

Sometimes called the "Elmer and the Dragons series", the three short novels were written by Ruth Stiles Gannett and illustrated by her stepmother Ruth Chrisman Gannett.

- My Father's Dragon (Random House, 1948)
- Elmer and the Dragon (Random House, 1950)
- The Dragons of Blueland (Random House, 1951)

50th Anniversary omnibus edition: Three Tales of My Father's Dragon (Random House, 1998), OCLC 37030387.

Other

- The Wonderful House-boat-train, illustrated by Fritz Eichenberg (Random, 1949), 63 pp. LCCN 49-11981
- Katie and the Sad Noise, illus. Ellie Simmons (Random, 1961), 61 pp. OCLC 1843354

Gannett introduced the 1991 Yearling edition of Edith Nesbit's collection The Book of Dragons (OCLC 696817759), later issued in the Looking Glass Library (2013, OCLC 869499406).
