= List of Pretty Rhythm: Aurora Dream episodes =

- No. of episodes: 51

Release
- Original network: TV Tokyo
- Original release: April 9, 2011 – March 31, 2012

Season chronology
- Next → Pretty Rhythm: Dear My Future

Pretty Rhythm: Aurora Dream is an anime television series produced by Tatsunoko Production and Avex Pictures based on the Japanese arcade game of the same name by Takara Tomy. The series is centered on Aira Harune, a Prism Star who performs Prism Shows. The series aired in Japan on TV Tokyo from April 9, 2011, to March 31, 2012. The series was originally set to debut on April 2, 2011, but it was postponed by a week due to the 2011 Tohoku earthquake. The English dub aired on Animax Asia from January 31, 2014, to April 11, 2014. In addition to the television series, several two-minute shorts were released exclusively onto the DVD home releases. It was followed by its direct sequel series Pretty Rhythm: Dear My Future.

A live-action segment titled "Pretty Rhythm Studio" appeared in every episode. It is hosted by Akina Minami (nicknamed Akkina) and is centered on the Prism Mates, three trainees from Avex Dance Master consisting of Mia Kusakabe, Reina Kubo, and Karin Takahashi, chronicling their training in dance, singing, and fashion sense to debut as idols, like the main characters in the show. Near the end of the series, the Prism Mates debuted in the group Prizmmy along with Ayami Sema, the winner of the Pretty Rhythm Award at the Kiratto Entertainment Challenge Contest 2011 Summer.

The opening theme songs are "You May Dream" by Lisp for episodes 1-29 and "Catch My Heart 1000%" by Pretty Rhythm All Stars for episodes 30–51. The ending theme songs are "Happy Go Lucky (Happy Lucky de Go)" by Super Girls for episodes 1–12; "We Will Win (Kokoro no Baton de Po Pon no Pon)" by Tokyo Girls' Style for episodes 13–26; "Pretty Rhythm de Go" by MARs (Kana Asumi, Sayuri Hara, and Azusa Kataoka as their characters) for episodes 27–39; and "Everybody's Gonna Be Happy" by Prizmmy for episodes 40–51.

== Episode list ==
=== Pretty Rhythm: Aurora Dream ===
No.	Title	Original release date
1	"A Star is Born!"; Transliteration: "Sutā Tanjō!" (Japanese: スタア誕生!)	April 9, 2011
While shopping one day, Aira Harune runs into Rizumu Amamiya. Jun sees potential in the both of them and, despite their lack of experience, has them perform in Mion Takamine's place at her debut showcase with Callings, due to her disappearing. Because Rizumu is unable to perform a Prism Jump, she fails to entertain the crowd, while Aira is unable to skate. With encouragement from Jun, Aira pays attention to her outfit and performs a Prism Jump, "Fresh Fruits Basket." Akkina and the Prism Mates introduce themselves at Prism Stone, where the Prism Mates will be training to prepare for their debut. The Prism Mates give fashion tips based on Aira's outfit in the episode.
2	"Rizumu, a Jump from the Heart!"; Transliteration: "Rizumu, Kokoro no Janpu!" (Japanese: りずむ、心のジャンプ!)	April 16, 2011
Rizumu brings Aira to Pretty Top School, a Prism Star dance school, to see how she is able to perform a Prism Jump. Jun offers them both a scholarship and to debut as Mion's stand-ins, but Rizumu angrily declines. When Aira visits her apartment, Rizumu confides in her about her frustrations of being unable to perform a Prism Jump and hopes to perform "Aurora Rising" one day. To encourage her, Aira helps her coordinate a new outfit. At the Prism Show, Rizumu performs in her new outfit with the Prism Jump "Heartful Splash." The Prism Mates give fashion advice on hair accessories and demonstrate with Prism Stones on the arcade game.
3	"They're Our Coaches!? Rabichi and Bearchi"; Transliteration: "Kore ga Kōchi!? Rabichi to Beachi" (Japanese: これがコーチ!? ラビチとベアチ)	April 23, 2011
Aira and Rizumu meet Yamada and Mr. Penguin, who assign Rabichi and Bearchi as their coaches. Both coaches put the girls through strange and unorthodox training methods, but in the end, they discover that the training improved Aira's coordination and Rizumu's fashion sense. The Prism Mates coordinate sexy-type outfits using Takara Tomy's Millefeui Cards, and Mia models her "bittersweet mix sexy" outfit.
4	"Easter is a Heart-Pounding Experience!"; Transliteration: "Īsutā wa Mune Kyun Taiken!" (Japanese: イースターは胸キュン体験!)	April 30, 2011
Aira convinces Rizumu to go Prism Stone to buy new accessories, but they are sold out by the time they arrive. They encounter the members of Callings, who ask for their help to run an event for the shop. Aira suggests an Easter-themed event with a Prism Show. Before she and Rizumu perform, she finds out that Sho had given her the hair clip she had wanted, and her feelings inspire a new Prism Jump, "Heart-pounding Experience", while Rizumu performs "Colorful Choco Parade." After the show, Aira learns that Sho is the designer and owner of Prism Stone and believes her feelings for him are out of admiration of that. The Prism Mates coordinate lovely-type outfits using Takara Tomy's Millefeui Cards, and Karin models her "ultra lovely" outfit.
5	"Don't Tell Dad About the Fashion Show"; Transliteration: "Papa ni wa Naisho de Fasshon Shō" (Japanese: パパにはナイショでファッションショー)	May 7, 2011
Aira and Rizumu are scheduled to perform at a fashion show, but Aira is struggling to hide her fame from her overbearing father. Rizumu convinces her to reveal the truth, but Aira's father finds out before she is able to do so, and they get into a fight. When he attends their Prism Show, he demands Aira wear the unflattering outfit he bought for her as a condition to being a Prism Star. To his dismay, Aira alters the skirt for her Prism Show, but she later wears the rest of the unmodified outfit during a press conference, recognizing how much he cares for her. The Prism Mates practice dancing in sync to "You May Dream" and walking on runways.
6	"The Prism's Sparkle is Always Here"; Transliteration: "Purizumu no Kagayaki wa Itsumo Koko Ni" (Japanese: プリズムの輝きはいつもここに)	May 14, 2011
Aira and Rizumu are assigned to lead a dance workshop for children and their mothers in Hakone to celebrate Mother's Day. With their parents chaperoning them, Aira learns that her mother used to be a stylist for Rizumu's mother, a Prism Star. At Hakone, the girls meet Natsuki, who refuses to participate as she is waiting for her busy mother to come from work. Rizumu urges her to not be selfish for the sake of her mother, which hurts her feelings. When Natsuki comes to realize Rizumu's intentions, she gives her the pin meant for her mother. This inspires Rizumu to perform a new Prism Jump, "Unlimited Love Shower", during her Prism Show. Akkina checks in on the Prism Mates' fashion sense and gives them advice on how to improve their outfits. The Prism Mates then practice coordinating outfits with the Feminine Prism Stones.
7	"No Longer Friends!? Aira and Rizumu's Big Fight"; Transliteration: "Zekkō!? Aira to Rizumu no Ōgenka" (Japanese: 絶交!? あいらとりずむの大ゲンカ)	May 21, 2011
Aira and Rizumu get into an argument over whether Mion is their enemy, as well as Aira's motives to being a Prism Star. Aira decides to quit, while Rizumu performs by herself. With advice from Sho, Aira rushes to Rizumu's Prism Show, where she is struggling to perform a Prism Jump, and helps her coordinate a new outfit. After reconciling with her, Rizumu performs a new Prism Jump, "Stardust Shower." When the show ends, Jun tells the two that they are rivals, who are not enemies but friends who motivate each other.
8	"Rizumu in a Pinch! The Big Study Plan!"; Transliteration: "Rizumu Pinchi! Obenkyō Dai Sakusen" (Japanese: りずむピンチ! お勉強大作戦)	May 28, 2011
Rizumu fails her midterm tests in English, math, and science. She must score at least 70 points on the make-up test or she will have to retire from being a Prism Star. Everyone in the Pretty Top staff unsuccessfully attempt to tutor Rizumu. Eventually, Wataru teaches her through dancing, and she gets the score she needed just in time for the Prism Show.
9	"The School Festival and the Secret Promise"; Transliteration: "Gakuen-sai to Himitsu no Yakusoku" (Japanese: 学園祭と秘密の約束)	June 4, 2011
As the Tiara Cup approaches, Jun informs Aira and Rizumu that the winner receives the Rare Tiara, one of the items required to perform Aurora Rising. Rizumu becomes so absorbed in practicing that she cuts off contact with her friends. While training, she finds Hibiki practicing in a secluded spot at the park, and he advises her to focus on having fun instead of winning. With his advice in mind, Rizumu returns to Aira to perform a Prism Show together, and she performs a new Prism Jump, "Happy Macaron Spin." In response to Akkina's e-mail, the Prism Mates coordinate outfits based on time, place, and occasion.
10	"The Lovely Rainbow From Endless Rain"; Transliteration: "Ame Nochi Raburī Reinbō" (Japanese: 雨のちラブリーレインボー)	June 11, 2011
Sho invites Aira to help him with new clothing designs for Prism Stone, and Aira mistakenly believes they are on a date. Sho becomes frustrated with her critique and upsets her, but after Hibiki shows her his sketchbook, she learns that he is under pressure. When Sho gives Aira a shirt he designed, Aira modifies it with inspiration through him and wears it for her Prism Show, performing a new Prism Jump called "Lovely Rainbow." Sho becomes thankful as Callings perform after her, and they reconcile. Akkina e-mails the Prism Mates suggesting they coordinate their outfits with their shoes. The Prism Mates select different shoes to balance their outfits better.
11	"The Curtains Are Raised for the Tiara Cup!"; Transliteration: "Kaimaku! Tiarakappu" (Japanese: 開幕! ティアラカップ)	June 18, 2011
As the Tiara Cup begins, during the wedding-themed fashion round, Rizumu lands in 9th place with 724 carats, while Aira wins 1st place with 1050 carats using a something blue-themed outfit inspired by Kyoko. Both qualify for the second round, which features a Prism Show, but before it begins, Rizumu gets a fever from lack of sleep. Aira buys time to let her rest, and after Rizumu wakes up, the two perform their Prism Jumps individually. Aira is nearly disqualified for going over the time limit, but the judges decide to give her a 200 point penalty instead, and both girls tie in first place with 2670 carats. Unbeknownst to them, Mion watches their performances. Akkina e-mails the Prism Mates suggesting they coordinate their outfits with their hairstyles. The Prism Mates select different hairstyles and accessories to balance their outfits better.
12	"Who will win the Tiara Of Victory!?"; Transliteration: "Shōri no Tiara wa Dare no Teni!?" (Japanese: 勝利の栄冠は誰の手に!?)	June 25, 2011
Before the finals begin, three girls sneak into Aira and Rizumu's dressing room and steal their Prism Stones. Aira gives her remaining Prism Stones to Rizumu, who scores 3707 carats with two Prism Jumps. Sho and Rizumu confront Aira after discovering she has no Prism Stones left, but she decides to perform in her normal outfit, amazing the audience with two Prism Jumps, including a new one called "Bloom-Bloom-Blooming Love Flowers." She wins the Tiara Cup with 3728 carats, but Mion, annoyed with the attention she is receiving, interferes and performs a Prism Show with "Do-Re-Mi-Fa Slider" and "Golden Star Magic" as her Prism Jumps. Karin shares the history about "something blue" in wedding dresses. After receiving an e-mail from Akkina warning them about their upcoming final exams, the Prism Mates coordinate their own individual outfits and practice their runway pose.
13	"Andy's Tears"; Transliteration: "Andi no Namida" (Japanese: アンディの涙)	July 2, 2011
Andy, a stuffed bear made by Rizumu's mother Sonata, tells Bearchi about Sonata's past, where she competed for the title of the Prism Queen against Kyoko. After returning from retirement, Sonata trained rigorously for a year to perform the legendary jump "Aurora Rising" under Kei Takigawa's guidance; however, she is warned that "Aurora Rising" requires her to devote herself to Prism Shows only and sacrifice things important to her. Once she performs it successfully, she leaves Rizumu and her husband behind out of guilt for sacrificing her time with them to train. For their final exam, the Prism Mates coordinate their individual outfits and put on a fashion show. They pass the test and reach Gold rank.
14	"Mion, Switch On"; Transliteration: "Mion Suitchi On" (Japanese: みおんスイッチオン)	July 9, 2011
Mion returns to Pretty Top, which excites Aira and irritates Rizumu. Aira and Rizumu are offered to compete in the Summer Queen Cup for the Rare Wedding Dress, but because it is a duo tournament, only one of them will be chosen to perform with Mion. With the new Bato Pon, Aira and Rizumu each put on separate performances with Mion for the Tanabata, but Mion outperforms both of them and saves them from making mistakes, ending their performance with the Prism Jump "Heartbeat Memory Leaf." After she confronts the two, both girls realize they still have much to learn in becoming professionals. Akkina informs the Prism Mates that they will now begin dance training and introduces the Bato Pons to them, which they will use during their dance lessons.
15	"My Heart's Fiery!"; Transliteration: "Meramera Hāto ga Atsuku Naru!" (Japanese: めらめらハートがあつくなる!)	July 16, 2011
While training Aira and Rizumu, Mion suggests that the two release a CD single after discovering neither can sing and dance at the same time. As Mion is forced to be in the group as well, she teaches them how to sing with assistance from the members of Callings. The girls put on a successful Prism Show with the Prism Jump "Colorful Choco Parade Duo." Jubi teaches the Prism Mates how to dance to "You May Dream" with the Bato Pons. At the end of the episode, the Prism Mates practice hip-hop dance while discussing its core features and history.
16	"Necochi's Trial"; Transliteration: "Nekochi no Shiren" (Japanese: ネコチの試練)	July 23, 2011
After Mion's father is unable to come to her Prism Show, Nekochi becomes concerned about her, which leads to an argument between them. Aira and Rizumu try to boost Mion's confidence by giving her their Prism Watches, which they decorated themselves. After realizing she is not alone, Mion puts on a successful performance. Jubi continues teaching the Bato Pon choreography to "You May Dream." At the end of the episode, the Prism Mates practice jazz dance while discussing its core features and history.
17	"Intensive Training with Cake in the Happy Lucky Summer!"; Transliteration: "Hapiraki Samā wa Kēki de Tokkun!" (Japanese: ハピラキサマーはケーキで特訓!)	July 30, 2011
While Aira and Rizumu are struggling to catch each other's Bato Pons, Aira's family's bakery is overflowing with customers due to Callings advertising it. Aira and Rizumu help out at the bakery, and with Mion's assistance, they finish making the cakes on time. At their Prism Show, using the skills they learned from baking, Aira and Rizumu put on a successful performance with a new Prism Jump, "Colorful Chocolate Parade Duo." Jubi continues teaching the Bato Pon choreography to "You May Dream" and shows the Prism Mates how to twirl the Bato Pons. At the end of the episode, the Prism Mates practice popping while discussing its core features and history.
18	"Love Blooms in the Summer Night Sky"; Transliteration: "Yozora ni Hana Saku Koi Gokoro" (Japanese: 夜空に花咲く恋ゴコロ)	August 6, 2011
Aira, Rizumu, and the members of Callings go to the Summer Festival. As they split into pairs, Sho asks Aira about her future, while Hibiki asks Rizumu why she wants to become a Prism Star. Wataru helps Mion understand she has friends to depend on. Aira and Rizumu later perform a Prism Show at the festival, wearing the new yukata designed by Sho and performing the Prism Jump "Heart Arc Fantasy." Jubi continues teaching the Bato Pon choreography to "You May Dream." At the end of the episode, the Prism Mates practice house dance while discussing its core features and history.
19	"Duo decision! The Girls' Destiny Date"; Transliteration: "Duo Kettei! Unmei no Gāruzu Dēto" (Japanese: デュオ決定! 運命のガールズ・デート)	August 13, 2011
Mion must choose between Aira and Rizumu as her partner for the Summer Queen Cup. To decide, she goes on a date with Aira to the zoo for one day, and Prism Land with Rizumu for the next. Each date ends disastrously, but Mion learns that Aira wants to support Rizumu, while Rizumu wants to compete to perform "Aurora Rising." She has the two perform in front of her, and the girls perform "Stardust Shower Duo." Mion selects Aira as her partner, causing Rizumu to run out in shock. Jubi teaches the final part of Bato Pon choreography to "You May Dream." At the end of the episode, the Prism Mates practice locking while discussing its core features and history.
20	"Rivals from Kansai! Serena and Kanon Appear!!"; Transliteration: "Raibaru wa Kansaikko! Serena to Kanon Tōjō!!" (Japanese: ライバルは関西っ娘! セレナとかのん登場!!)	August 20, 2011
While Mion trains with Aira, she admits that she had selected her to test Rizumu's resolve. After noticing Rizumu has not given up her dream, Mion arranges Aira and Rizumu to enter the Summer Queen Cup together. Before their performance begins, they encounter Serena Jounouchi and Kanon Toudou, two Prism Stars from the Kansai region, who taunt them. Aira and Rizumu put on a successful performance with the Prism Jump "Fly High Cheer Girls" and places in 1st, but Serena and Kanon warn them that they have a weakness that may cost them the next round. Akkina informs the Prism Mates that Tokyo Girls' Style will be teaching them the choreography to the new ending theme song, "We Will Win (Kokoro no Baton de Po Pon no Pon)." She also tells them that for their Platinum rank test, they will be performing live at the Kiratto Entertainment Challenge Contest 2011. To prepare, the Prism Mates dance to "Dance (Mahō no Groove)", a hip-hop dance from the arcade game.
21	"Storm of the Summer Queen Cup"; Transliteration: "Arashi no Samā Kuīn Kappu" (Japanese: 嵐のサマークイーンカップ)	August 27, 2011
Mion is suspicious about Serena and Kanon's warning, despite Aira and Rizumu's reassurance that they are in sync after noticing Serena and Kanon do not get along. However, Serena and Kanon use their differences to their advantage, which allows them to win the Summer Queen Cup. Mion feels responsible for Aira and Rizumu's loss, but the two girls affirm that she is not to blame and they will work harder for the next competition. The members of Tokyo Girls' Style demonstrate the choreography to "We Will Win (Kokoro no Baton de Po Pon no Pon)." The Prism Mates later dance to "Dance (Mahō no Groove)" and teach how to do the Roger Rabbit.
22	"We dedicate to you the blessing of Skate constellation!" Transliteration: "Sukēto-za no Shukufuku o Kimi ni!" (Japanese: スケート座の祝福を君に!)	September 3, 2011
Aira and Rizumu discover that both were born on the same day, under the Skater constellation. After hearing this, Mion plans a surprise birthday party with help from Callings. After Mion puts on a Prism Show at Aira's request, Kyoko and Jun announce that Mion, Aira, and Rizumu are scheduled to debut as a group under the name "MARs", also revealing that Mion was also born under the Skater constellation when it appeared in the Southern hemisphere. The Prism Mates show off the first half of the choreography to "We Will Win (Kokoro no Baton de Po Pon no Pon)." They later dance to "Step! Step! Step!", a song from the arcade game using a mix of hip-hop and jazz dance.
23	"Heart Pounding Showbiz Debut of MARs!"; Transliteration: "MARs dokidoki geinō-kai debyū" (Japanese: MARsドキドキ芸能界デビュー)	September 10, 2011
MARs will formally debut on Callings' variety show, Go! Go!! Callings, but Rizumu's nervousness and meddling from Aira's father ruin their broadcast. During the game segment, Hibiki, Serena, and Kanon compete against MARs, and despite Aira's father destroying the set, they win. Afterwards, they perform a Prism Show live for the first time as a trio with the song "My Heart's Fiery!" The Prism Mates show off the final half of the choreography to "We Will Win (Kokoro no Baton de Po Pon no Pon)." They later dance to "Step! Step! Step!" and teach how tut.
24	"Comedy Showdown in School Trip"; Transliteration: "Shūgaku ryokō de owarai taiketsu" (Japanese: 修学旅行でお笑い対決)	September 17, 2011
Aira, Rizumu, and Mion go on a school trip to Kyoto, where they find Hibiki filming a segment for Go! Go!! Callings. Rizumu gets jealous of Hibiki and Kanon's relationship, while Serena invites MARs to attend their comedy routine. MARs finds out that Serena had planned on humiliating them by forcing them to perform as their opening act. However, their impromptu comedy routine performance becomes a success and they end with a Prism Show. Afterwards, Hibiki clarifies to Rizumu that Kanon is his little sister. The Prism Mates dance to the full choreography of "We Will Win (Kokoro no Baton de Po Pon no Pon)." They later dance to "Dreamin' Boys & Girls", an idol song from the arcade game.
25	"Pledge of Friendship! The Aurora Wings"; Transliteration: "Yūjō no chikai! Ōrora no tsubasa" (Japanese: 友情の誓い! オーロラの翼)	September 24, 2011
Aira and Rizumu hold a slumber party, where Aira and Mion learn that Sonata Kanzaki is Rizumu's mother. After Mion sees how serious Rizumu is about performing "Aurora Rising", she warns her about how dangerous it is. Mion and Rizumu agree to a Prism Show where if Rizumu is unable to pull off "Aurora Rising", she must leave MARs. Rizumu attempts to jump, but "Aurora Rising" overwhelms her. Afterwards, she promises Aira and Mion that she will prioritize MARs while completing her training to perform Aurora Rising. The Prism Mates answer fan letters and introduce the Prism Music Player and Aurora Dream Stone. Afterwards, they dance to "Dreamin' Boys & Girls."
26	"Kneaded Together! The Pretty Recipe of Victory"; Transliteration: "Konete matomeru! Shōbu no Puritī Reshipi" (Japanese: こねてまとめる! 勝負のプリティーレシピ)	October 1, 2011
Aira, Rizumu, and Mion make a gyōza dumpling for Kyoko while recapping the events of the previous 25 episodes. After Kyoko eats it, the smell turns away one of her potential suitors at her omiai. The Prism Mates recount their training in the past 25 episodes, with footage of their performance from the Kiratto Entertainment Challenge Contest 2011. They reach the Platinum rank, but Akina tells them they will be working on singing next.
27	"Dolphin Venus in the Tropical Beach"; Transliteration: "Nangoku Bīchi no Dorufin Bīnasu" (Japanese: 南国ビーチのドルフィンビーナス)	October 8, 2011
MARs and Serenon are filming a Prism Survival Challenge in Saipan, where they are tasked to find the legendary heart dolphin. Rizumu and Mion rescue a lone dolphin, which Rizumu names Kuchibashi and becomes determined to find its parents. After Serenon's Prism Show, MARs performs next, and Kuchibashi joins Rizumu's dancing, inspiring a new Prism Jump called "Dolphin Venus." The Prism Jump allows Kuchibashi to be reunited with a herd of heart dolphins. Akkina reveals to the Prism Mates that they will be singing to "You May Dream" while dancing. The Prism Mates perform in front of their vocal coach, Meme, who gives them advice on how to improve.
28	"Sweet Honey Kiss For Stubborn Master"; Transliteration: "Ganko oyaji ni Hachimitsu Kissu" (Japanese: 頑固オヤジにはちみつキッス)	October 15, 2011
MARs goes to Akihabara to interview the uncooperative owner of a curry shop for a television program. To attract customers, MARs is given maid outfits from Callings, but Mion refuses to wear it. Mion learns from the owner that the curry shop only serves authentic curry, and the shop is losing customers because he refuses to change his ways. As Mion relates to him, she decides to adapt to change by wearing her uniform and invites him to watch MARs' Prism Show. During the Prism Show, Mion performs a new Prism Jump, "Honey Kiss", which inspires the owner to accept her help. The curry shop eventually booms in business. Meme instructs the Prism Mates to learn about different types of rhythms for them to adapt to while singing.
29	"Let's Trio Jump! Hip Hop Win!"; Transliteration: "Torio de Janpu! Hippu Hoppu Win!" (Japanese: トリオでジャンプ! Hip Hop Win!)	October 22, 2011
MARs will be releasing a new song, "Hop! Step!! Jump!!!", and entering the Pure Crystal High Heel Cup for the Pure Crystal High Heels. After disagreeing over whether Yuri, Mion's friend from New York, should choreograph their routine, Rizumu and Mion end their friendship. To settle this, Yuri challenges MARs to a game of streetball with Serenon, where she will help the winner with their choreography. Rizumu later learns that Mion enlisted Yuri's help to increase their chances of winning, and the two reconcile. During the game, MARs pulls off a move that allows them to win. They later use it as the Prism Jump "Cheerful Hip Hop Win" when debuting their song. Meme teaches the Prism Mates to how to project their voice by measuring the decibels of their voices and using party horns.
30	"Heart Pounding and Throbbing Halloween Party Night"; Transliteration: "Dokidoki Harouin wa Tokimeki ja Naito" (Japanese: ドキドキハロウィンはときめきじゃナイト☆)	October 29, 2011
Pretty Top holds a Halloween festival in the Motomachi shopping district. While preparing for the festival, Mion becomes frightened when she and Wataru get supplies from a dark warehouse. Recalling Mion's crush on Jun, Wataru asks her to depend on him instead. Before Mion is convinced, Rizumu's prank accidentally leads MARs to a stage. To excite the audience, Callings performs a Prism Show, followed by MARs with their new Prism Jump, "Exciting Halloween Night." Meme gives the Prism Mates advice on how to project their voices, beginning with breathing and trilling exercises.
31	"Aira and Flare Collaborate"; Transliteration: "Aira to Flare, Korabocchao" (Japanese: あいらとふれあ、コラボっちゃお♥)	November 5, 2011
Aira and Sho meet Flare Nanri, (Note: Flare Nanri is the main character of Rio Fujimi's manga adaptation of Pretty Rhythm: Aurora Dream, which ran in Ciao from 2011 to 2012.) a fan of Prism Stone. Noticing her talent for fashion design, Sho encourages Flare to sign up for the Design Idea Contest, where the winner's designs will be made into a clothing line at Prism Stone. Meanwhile, Aira has become burned out from work, and to inspire her, Sho has her choose the winner. Aira unknowingly chooses Flare's design, which she had submitted to cheer her up, and MARs performs in it with a new Prism Jump, "Vitamin Garden Sunshine." Meme teaches the Prism Mates how to step, clap, and sing to the beat at the same time to build a sense of rhythm.
32	"LOL! Sere-non's Manzai discipling in Asakusa"; Transliteration: "Bakushō! Sere-non Asakusa Manzai Shugyō" (Japanese: 爆笑! せれのん浅草漫才修行)	November 12, 2011
Serenon loses the Dream Ent Manzai Grand Prix because veteran comedienne Shizuko Nakayama gives them a low score. Serena and Kanon urge her to reconsider their talent, but instead, Shizuko has them do menial chores. During this time, the two learn about Shizuko's past and later become the opening act to her retirement performance. This time, their act appeals to more people because of Shizuko's training. Afterwards, they perform a Prism Show with a new Prism Jump, "Smile Heart Dive Duo." Impressed, Shizuko decides to continue as a comedy act with Serenon. The Prism Mates continue their vocal lessons with Meme by practicing singing in pitch with a keyboard and by listening to the tune of "You May Dream."
33	"Aira in Wondergirl"; Transliteration: "Aira in Wandāgāru" (Japanese: あいら in ワンダーガール)	November 19, 2011
Aira and her friends take Uru and Eru out to Prismland for their birthdays, but Uru and Eru run off because Aira is more focused on Prism Shows than spending time with them. At the Dream Tree, a girl named Kaname Chris offers advice for Aira, and she tries to climb the tree in order to talk to her sisters. She falls down trying to rescue them, but Kaname saves her. After apologizing to each other, Aira performs a Prism Show with Rizumu and Mion. Meme teaches the Prism Mates how to sing with a falsetto voice to reach higher notes and how to project their voices.
34	"Is this Love!? Love Battle in the World of Showbiz"; Transliteration: "Korette Koi!? Geinōkai Rabu batoru" (Japanese: これって恋!? 芸能界ラブバトル)	November 26, 2011
Sho is rumored to be dating his film co-star, Nana Ichijo, especially after Nana orchestrates the paparazzi to publish photos of her hugging him. Aira becomes confused, but during MARs' performance on a music show, she uses the Prism Stones that Sho gave to her and realizes she is in love with him. This causes her to perform "Bloom-Bloom-Blooming Love Flowers" and an upgraded version of "Heart-pounding Experience." After the show, Sho clarifies to Aira that Nana lied about their relationship and that, while he will put Callings as his top priority, he has grown fond of her. Meme helps the Prism Mates practice singing in sync by keeping rhythm with instruments and a metronome.
35	"MARs Dream Live!"; Transliteration: "MARs Dorīmu Raibu!" (Japanese: MARs ドリームライブ!)	December 3, 2011
As MARs prepares for their first concert at the Budokan, Aira has trouble keeping up. Serenon taunts them about juggling their career with competing in the High Heel Cup, but Aira believes that they can do both. Before the end of their concert, the power goes out, but the stadium is illuminated by the audience's Bato Pons and Aira thanks them for their support. Kaname, who Aira had invited to the concert, leaves before the end and expresses interest in Prism Shows to a blonde woman. Meme teaches the Prism Mates to sing in harmony, demonstrating with "You May Dream" and "We Will Win."
36	"Kaname is an Angel? Or a Devil?"; Transliteration: "Kaname wa Enjeru? Soretomo Debiru?" (Japanese: かなめは天使? それとも悪魔?)	December 10, 2011
As the High Heel Cup approaches, Aira returns to the sports rink to practice and runs into Kaname on the way. She confides in her about her future dreams, and at Kaname's request, she puts on a Prism Show for her. In the middle of her performance, Kaname joins her and quickly learns her routine. Rizumu and Mion scold Aira for disclosing their routine and outfits. Aira dismisses their concerns, but Serenon appears and reveals Kaname to be their third member for the High Heel Cup. Meanwhile, Kyoko suspects that Sonata, revealed to be the blonde woman and Kaname's mother, has returned to Japan. The Prism Mates announce that Mion has been added as a playable character to the Pretty Rhythm: Aurora Dream arcade game. They receive an e-mail from Akkina telling them that a new member will be joining them for debut and Meme has prepared a song for their final exam. The Prism Mates practice singing with Meme's instructions.
37	"Fierce fight! Crystal High Heel Cup"; Transliteration: "Gekitō! Kurisutaru Haihīru Kappu" (Japanese: 激闘! クリスタルハイヒールカップ)	December 17, 2011
Aira becomes distressed during the Pure Crystal High Heel Cup, but Rizumu and Mion cheer her up by reminiscing the times they spent together as a group. With their strong friendship, MARs lands a new Prism Jump, "MARs Phoenix", and score 9770 carats. Serenon and Kaname perform last, but during their Prism Jump, Sonata commands Kaname to perform "Aurora Rising." Kaname unleashes a dark version of it, causing Serenon to fail their jump and score 7490 carats. MARs wins the Pure Crystal High Heels; however, Kyoko is shocked after learning Rizumu is Sonata's daughter and confirms that Sonata is in Japan. Meme suggests that the Prism Mates visualize the lyrics of their exam song to convey them better, and they do so by drawing scenarios and acting them out.
38	"On the Night of the Falling Miracle Snow"; Transliteration: "Mirakuru sunō no furu yoru ni" (Japanese: ミラクル・スノーの降る夜に)	December 24, 2011
MARs and Callings are putting on a Prism Show for Christmas, but Kyoko tells MARs that afterwards, the members will compete individually in tournaments. Meanwhile, Kaito, a boy from Uru and Eru's kindergarten, hopes for it to snow on Christmas Eve, because his late grandmother had promised it to him as a birthday present. With help from Callings, Rizumu, and Mion, Aira invites Kaito to their Prism Show, where they perform a Prism Jump, "Miracle Christmas Snow", which causes it to snow for real. Meme teaches the Prism Mates how to sing with a microphone.
39	"New Year Special Program: Close to the Charm of Prism Show!"; Transliteration: "Shinshun tokuban Purizumu Shō no miryoku ni semaru!" (Japanese: 新春特番・プリズムショーの魅力に迫る!)	January 7, 2012
As a New Years' special feature on Prism Shows, TV Tokyo presenters Moeko Ueda and Asami Konno interview MARs about Prism Jumps, their outfits, and their rivals, recapping the events of the previous episodes. The Prism Mates approach their singing exam, but they fail. After changing their outfits and remembering to make the audience happy, they reach the Prism Queen rank and pass. Akkina reveals that they, along with a new fourth member named Ayami, will be debuting as the group Prizmmy with their exam song, "Everybody's Gonna Be Happy."
40	"Their Determination"; Transliteration: "Sorezore no Ketsui" (Japanese: それぞれの決意)	January 14, 2012
Kyoko decides to have Aira, Rizumu, and Mion compete in the Prism Queen Cup. In order to enter, they must earn points from tournaments in the Prism Queen series. Rizumu vows to find Kei to teach her "Aurora Rising", while Mion wants to create her own Prism Jumps that will surpass "Aurora Rising." Mion enters the New Year Cup and competes against the current Prism Queen, Karina Togashi. Karina scores 7560 carats, but Mion performs and scores 8260 carats, winning the tournament. Karina gives Mion her Pure Fresh Wedding Dress Prism Stones, announcing that she is retiring. Afterwards, Mion leaves Japan to compete in overseas tournaments. Ayami introduces herself and shows off her talent in modeling. Prizmmy introduces their debut song, "Everybody's Gonna Be Happy", as the show's new ending theme song.
41	"The wish of Pure Premium Wedding"; Transliteration: "Pyua Premiamu Wedingu no Negai" (Japanese: ピュアプレミアムウェディングの願い)	January 21, 2012
Kyoko fails to convince Rizumu to stop looking for Kei. During the Pure Premium Wedding Cup, Kyoko tells Aira about her rivalry with Sonata, and how her refusal to learn "Aurora Rising" caused Kei to teach Sonata instead, which damaged her from not mastering it completely. As Kyoko fears Rizumu will have same fate, Aira promises that she will master "Aurora Rising" first to save her. Aira performs "Fresh Fruits Basket" with a new Prism Jump, "Miss Fairy Girl", scoring 8280 carats and winning the Pure Premium Wedding Prism Stones; however, Kei approaches Rizumu during the competition. Reina leads a quiz game where the other members of Prizmmy must guess random facts about her correctly. Later, behind-the-scenes footage from Prizmmy recording their debut single recording is broadcast.
42	"Rizumu and Sonata, a Fated Reunion"; Transliteration: "Rizumu to Sonata, Unmei no Saikai" (Japanese: りずむとそなた、運命の再会)	January 28, 2012
At the Winter Snow Cup, Kaname uses Sonata's choreography and scores 8280 carats after performing "Fresh Fruits Basket" and "Stardust Shower Perfect." Rizumu is pressured to best Kaname and performs "Super Stardust Shower." During her jump, she spots Sonata with her father and almost loses her landing, scoring 7290 carats and placing in 2nd. Afterwards, she attempts to catch up to Sonata, but Sonata ignores her and leaves with Kaname. Kyoko finally allows Rizumu to meet with Kei under Jun's supervision. Rizumu agrees to sacrifice her friendship with Aira and Mion to begin training. Mia leads a quiz game where the other members of Prizmmy must guess random facts about her correctly. Later, behind-the-scenes footage from Prizmmy recording their music video is broadcast.
43	"The Pure White Wedding of Girls' Friendship"; Transliteration: "Yūjō no Pyua Howaito Wedingu" (Japanese: 友情のピュアホワイトウェディング)	February 4, 2012
Without a wedding dress Prism Stone, Rizumu cannot perform "Aurora Rising" nor participate in the Prism Queen Cup. Mion bargains Serena and Kanon for their Pure White Wedding Dress with Prism Stones she won from her tournaments. While Serena and Kanon have no use for the Pure White Wedding Dress, Serena challenges Mion to an endurance dance-off, while Kanon challenges Rizumu at the Aquarium Cup, under the condition that she breaks up with Hibiki if she loses. Both Rizumu and Mion win their bets, with Rizumu placing 1st with 7950 carats and Kanon conceding the Pure White Wedding Dress. Karin leads a quiz game where the other members of Prizmmy must guess random facts about her correctly. Later, behind-the-scenes footage from Prizmmy recording their music video is broadcast.
44	"Sweet and Bitter Valentine Day"; Transliteration: "Suīto ando Bitā Barentain" (Japanese: スイート&ビターバレンタイン)	February 11, 2012
Kyoko asks Aira's parents for permission to perform "Aurora Rising", as she believes Aira is pure enough to master the jump successfully. At the Valentine Cup, Sho gives Aira the Wedding Teardrop Necklace as a good luck charm, and Aira performs the Prism Jump "Valentine Sweets Parade." During her Prism Show, Rizumu, who is waiting for Hibiki at their secret place, is reminded by Kei to sacrifice everything important to her in order to perform "Aurora Rising." Aira wins the Valentine Cup with 8650 carats, while Rizumu breaks up with Hibiki. Ayami leads a quiz game where the other members of Prizmmy must guess random facts about her correctly. Afterwards, Prizmmy teaches their trademark pose.
45	"Buenos Aires in Search of Ray"; Transliteration: "Hikari tazunete Buenosu Airesu" (Japanese: 光訪ねてブエノスアイレス)	February 18, 2012
Despite qualifying to enter the Prism Queen Cup, Mion is facing a slump in creating new Prism Jumps and refuses to return to Japan. To inspire her, Jun takes her to her hometown, Buenos Aires, on a self-discovery journey. Mion learns from her parents that she, too, was also born under the Skater constellation, and Jun brings her to a skating rink blessed by the Prism Goddess located in the mountains. Inspired by the diamond dust, Mion performs a new Prism Jump, "Shining Diamond Dust Burning", at the Argentina Cup, winning with 9070 carats and beating Serena. Tokyo Girls' Style perform "Ganbatte Itsudatte Shinjiteru" for Prizmmy.
46	"Confrontation! Aira versus Rizumu"; Transliteration: "Taiketsu! Aira tai Rizumu" (Japanese: 対決! あいら vs りずむ)	February 25, 2012
Rizumu's anger has overwhelmed her and she blames Aira for winning the Tiara Cup and preventing her from performing "Aurora Rising." When Aira and their parents attempt to rescue Rizumu from Kei, she challenges Aira to a Prism Show duel, wagering on the Pure Crystal Tiara. Rizumu performs a dark version of "Aurora Rising", which opens a portal to hell. Aira attempts to rescue Rizumu, but the portal nearly swallows her until Mion saves them both at the last minute. Prizmmy and Tokyo Girls' Style play charades.
47	"Betting on the Finalists"; Transliteration: "Fainarisuto wo Kakete" (Japanese: ファイナリストをかけて)	March 3, 2012
At the Budokan Cup for the semi-finals, the contestants must place in the top 3 to compete in the Prism Queen Cup with Mion. Serena and Kanon both tie with 9120 carats. Kaname performs "Fresh Fruits Basket" and "Aurora Rising", scoring 9550 carats and placing in 1st overall. Aira performs in her outfit from the Tiara Cup with "Fresh Fruits Paradise" and "Miss Fairy Girl", scoring 9130 carats and placing 2nd overall. Akkina tells Prizmmy they will be performing "Everybody's Gonna Be Happy" at a live event. Afterwards, Prizmmy staffs at the Prism Stone shop in Yokohama.
48	"Sonata's Winter"; Transliteration: "Sonata no Fuyu" (Japanese: そなたの冬)	March 10, 2012
Rizumu wears Aira's Pure Crystal Tiara and a Prism Stone attached to Andy and performs "Aurora Rising" successfully, scoring 9670 carats and placing 1st, qualifying for the Prism Queen Cup. She passes out from exhaustion. Rizumu's father confides in her about Sonata's childhood and the events that led her to leaving the family. Rizumu awakens and tells him she saw that Sonata still loves them through "Aurora Rising", and she must perform the jump again to show her they love her. Prizmmy teaches the dance to "Everybody's Gonna Be Happy."
49	"Soar! The Aurora Wings"; Transliteration: "Maiagare! Ōrora no Tsubasa" (Japanese: 舞い上がれ! オーロラの翼)	March 17, 2012
Kaname earns 6510 carats after failing to perform "Aurora Rising." Sonata is unable to face the guilt from abandoning her family shown through the aurora's light and takes Kaname with her to Russia. Rizumu is notified that Sonata is leaving but decides to perform anyway and calls out to her with "Aurora Rising Final", her version of the jump. Midway through her Prism Show, she and her father leave to convince Sonata to stay. Though reunited as family again, Rizumu is disqualified for not completing her Prism Show. Footage from Prizmmy's live performance at Dance Nation is broadcast.
50	"New Prism Queen is Born!"; Transliteration: "Shin Purizumu Kuīn Tanjō!" (Japanese: 新プリズムクイーン誕生!)	March 24, 2012
Mion performs with her new Prism Jump, "Eternal Big Bang", scoring 10000 carats. Aira performs with "Aurora Rising Dream", which causes everyone in the crowd to perform "Aurora Rising" with her. Aira's score is undetermined, but it exceeded the maximum number of carats and she is crowned the new Prism Queen, winning the Prism Queen Cup. Footage from Prizmmy's live performance at Dance Nation and fan meeting session is broadcast.
51	"Dream goes on..." Transliteration: "Dorīmu gōzu on" (Japanese: ドリーム ゴズーオン。。。)	March 31, 2012
Aira goes on a date with Sho, while Kyoko buys Serena and Kanon's agency under Pretty Top School's name. Jun goes abroad to look for more potential Prism Stars, while Hibiki, Serena, Kanon, and Kyoko are invited to dinner with Rizumu and Kaname's family. The Pair Cheer mascots graduate and get promoted. Aira, Rizumu, and Mion continue their activities as MARs and puts on a Prism Show. Prizmmy recounts their favorite parts in training. Later, footage of their performance at their CD event is broadcast.

=== Prism Comedy Theater ===
Prism Comedy Theater (プリズム笑劇場, Purizumu Shōgekijō) is a series of 2-minute shorts released as exclusives on the DVD and Blu-ray home release. Each disc is bundled with two episodes. Outside of Japan, these shorts were broadcast as a replacement for the "Pretty Rhythm Studio" segments.

No.	Title	Original release date
1	"Episode 1"	July 22, 2011
1	"Episode 2"	July 22, 2011
Aira has a nightmare where her father asks her to perform "Fresh Fruits Basket" repeatedly to harvest fruit for his pastries. Rizumu asks Aira and her siblings for help on creating a new title to describe herself.
2	"Episode 3"	July 22, 2011
2	"Episode 4"	July 22, 2011
Aira and Rabichi put on a comedy routine, while Rizumu and Bearchi perform a magic trick. Sho shows Aira and Rizumu a new product for Prism Stone: a device that plays random phrases from Jun.
3	"Episode 5"	July 22, 2011
3	"Episode 6"	July 22, 2011
Uru and Eru go on their first errand along while their father watches them from behind. Rizumu tries to help Aira when she has stage fright right before her Prism Show.
4	"Episode 7"	August 26, 2011
4	"Episode 8"	August 26, 2011
Inspired by Mion, Aira opens a blog, which her father reads. To help Rizumu prepare for her remedial exams, Aira tutors her in English only to find out that Rizumu has exaggerated her English-speaking ability.
5	"Episode 9"	August 26, 2011
5	"Episode 10"	August 26, 2011
Aira drops Rabichi into an oasis, but every time Jun offers her Rabichi back, he ends up giving her more Rabichis. In response to Rizumu giving Aira advice about love, Hibiki asks Rizumu out on a date, only for her to cause the day to rain.
6	"Episode 11"	September 30, 2011
6	"Episode 12"	September 30, 2011
Rabichi and Bearchi thinks of ways they can support Aira and Rizumu and see that their cheering has caused two stars to shine, despite not knowing the stars were from Nekochi's eyes. Callings and Rizumu prank Aira by telling her that her chronic clumsiness will cause a catastrophe.
7	"Episode 13"	September 30, 2011
7	"Episode 14"	September 30, 2011
Rabichi tells a scary story about Aira planning with her siblings on ways to increase their allowance, only to have Itsuki manipulate them. Mion is a princess who bosses Callings around, until she falls in love with a nameless knight resembling Jun.
8	"Episode 15"	October 28, 2011
8	"Episode 16"	October 28, 2011
Mr. Penguin and Yamada put on a Prism Show. The Pair Cheers discuss when they are most vulnerable to their animal instincts, and when Mr. Penguin scolds them, he also reveals that his animal instinct is falling in love with Yamada.
9	"Episode 17"	October 28, 2011
9	"Episode 18"	October 28, 2011
To avoid eating peppers, Sho charms Aira into eating them for him. Aira, Rizumu, and Mion discuss how they would confess their love in the summer.
10	"Episode 19"	November 25, 2011
10	"Episode 20"	November 25, 2011
While Aira and Mion are at the zoo, Penguin Teacher tries to teach the Pair Cheers the differences between the emperor and Adélie penguins, only to have a zookeeper mistake Penguin Teacher for a runaway penguin. Uru and Eru write an essay about how loving their parents are for their summer homework and share it with Aira and Itsuki, but only Itsuki is able to tell that their parents are actually fighting.
11	"Episode 21"	November 25, 2011
11	"Episode 22"	November 25, 2011
Aira, Rizumu, and Mion find an injured cat in an alleyway, and Mion continuously shoots down Rizumu's headfirst approach to help it. Nekochi reveals the cat to be a bundle of rags, causing Rizumu to retaliate. In a magical girl parody, Rizumu and Mion try to defeat a monster with their Prism Jumps, but they are defeated. Aira reluctantly fights, but the monster only eats the fruits from her "Fresh Fruits Basket" Prism Jump.
12	"Episode 23"	December 21, 2011
12	"Episode 24"	December 21, 2011
Jun is featured on a segment of Go! Go!! Callings hosted by Wataru, where Sho and Hibiki must guess what his riddles mean. Serenon puts on a comedy routine where they imagine what their Pair Cheers would look like.
13	"Episode 25"	December 21, 2011
13	"Episode 26"	December 21, 2011
MARs goes on a quest to find the Golden Tiara and pass all the tests from the Pair Cheers. However, Bearchi neglects to tell them that the Golden Tiara is cursed before Mion puts it on, which turns her into a monkey. Kyoko orders Jun to fill up screentime after a misbooking for MARs but criticizes his acting.
14	"Episode 27"	January 27, 2012
14	"Episode 28"	January 27, 2012
Rizumu wakes up Penguin Teacher by grabbing what she believes to be his wig, until she discovers it was Yamada's chest hair. In a continuation of the magical girl parody, Jun, disguised as the Morning Mask, gives a motivating speech to Aira, but the monster defeats him.
15	"Episode 29"	January 27, 2012
15	"Episode 30"	January 27, 2012
MARs goes through their fan gifts and find a box of manjū, but they are unsure who it is from; however, the Pair Cheers secretly know it was from Yamada. Princess Aira looks over outfit designs submitted by readers of Ciao and chooses a winner but ignores the embarrassing strawberry dress her father submitted.
16	"Episode 31"	February 24, 2012
16	"Episode 32"	February 24, 2012
Flare cooks alone at home and reminisces two of her hometown friends, Nazuna and Nanoha. The two visit her so she wouldn't be alone, only to find her cooking unbearable. Serenon and Shizuko put on a comedy routine, which consists of them criticizing the cameraman for not filming them properly.
17	"Episode 33"	February 24, 2012
17	"Episode 34"	February 24, 2012
In the year 16000 BC, Aira is sent to gather food for her family but slips on a banana peel, causing the first record of Aurora Rising being performed. Aira has an Alice in Wonderland-themed dream, where Kyoko, the Queen of Hearts, is furious and threatens to execute Sho, the Jack of Hearts, unless she is entertained. Aira tries to impress her with her Prism Jumps, but the Queen of Hearts only laughs when she trips herself.
18	"Episode 35"	March 23, 2012
18	"Episode 36"	March 23, 2012
While running late to school, Mion transforms into Magical Mion to save Kyoko from being harassed by Serena and Kanon, who are forcing her to speak in Kansai dialect. Kaname visits the Prism Show World for the first time to dress up, and Meganee becomes concerned about how satisfied she is about her outfit after she begins sniffing it.
19	"Episode 37"	March 23, 2012
19	"Episode 38"	March 23, 2012
Mion, along with Aira and Rizumu, go on an exploration to find the Mushroom Kingdom, where Mion plans on buying all the mushroom goods to add to her collection. However, there is a witch guarding the kingdom, who is revealed to be Kei, and Mion decides to take her home. In Callings' dressing room, the boys have casual conversations about their daily life, and Jun secretly eats Hibiki's pudding.
20	"Episode 39"	April 27, 2012
20	"Episode 40"	April 27, 2012
While running late to school, Mion transforms into Magical Mion to rescue Penguin Teacher and Yamada, who have been captured by Moeko Ueda and Asami Konno. After she is attacked by Ueda and Konno's reporting, Mion defeats them with tongue twisters. Penguin Teacher and Yamada sing a version of "My Heart's Fiery!" with the lyrics centered on muscle training.
21	"Episode 41"	April 27, 2012
21	"Episode 42"	April 27, 2012
In the Prism Show World, Kyoko tries on the Pure Premium Wedding Dress and Meganee tries to get her to take off her glasses. Kyoko reveals she squints with her glasses removed, and Jun thanks Meganee for allowing Kyoko to show a new side to him. Kei trains Jun on how to eat snacks properly and change the television channel, with highly charged reactions to each movement.
22	"Episode 43"	May 25, 2012
22	"Episode 44"	May 25, 2012
In a continuation of the magical girl parody, the monster defeats Rizumu, Mion, and Morning Mask. Serenon fights the monster, but midway through battle, Serena's father interrupts and they have an impromptu comedy skit. In the Prism Galaxy, where the Skater constellation is located, on the Pretty Top Planet, MARs is depicted as cocoons who are ready to transform into butterflies. Instead, they transform into cocoons with different patterns, and it's revealed they are pets kept by Rabichi.
23	"Episode 45"	May 25, 2012
23	"Episode 46"	May 25, 2012
While running late to for a movie date with her tutor, Jun, Mion transforms into Magical Mion to rescue Rizumu from Aira forcing a Pretty Remake by painting her yellow. After Rizumu escapes, Aira takes Jun hostage, and Mion retaliates by throwing pink paint on them both, which changes both their personalities to become sweet and feminine. Rizumu recalls a fairy resembling Aira saving her from darkness with her "happy lucky" power and encourages her to help Mion, Kyoko, and Jun. However, the fairy runs away upon encountering Kei.
24	"Episode 47"	June 22, 2012
24	"Episode 48"	June 22, 2012
In a continuation of the magical girl parody, the monster defeats Rizumu, Mion, and Morning Mask, while Serenon loses motivation from Serena's father's bad jokes. Callings operates a robot to fight the monster, but Penguin Teacher and Yamada combine their ship with the monster to retaliate. Aira suddenly wakes up, revealing it to be a dream. While running late to school, Mion transforms into Magical Mion to save Kaname from being harassed by Kyoko, Sonata, and Aira's mother, who project their adult concerns as attacks on Mion. Mion is rescued by Magical Rizumu and Magical Aira, and they defeat the women.
25	"Episode 49"	June 22, 2012
25	"Episode 50"	June 22, 2012
25	"Episode 51"	June 22, 2012
Sonata readjusts to living in Japan, beginning with passing through the train gates. Kyoko is unable to perform Aurora Rising because she can't pronounce it, so Sonata does a duo Prism Jump to allow Kyoko to participate. Aira finds the entire cast of the show acting out the bizarre scenarios in the previous episodes and later wakes up, believing it to be a dream; however, the cast confirms everything is real.
