= Reina Kubo =

Japanese singer (born 1999)

- 久保玲奈
- Born: October 28, 1999 (age 26)
- Occupation: Singer
- Musical career
- Genres: J-pop
- Instruments: Vocals; piano
- Years active: 2012–present
- Label: EXPG
- Website: expg.jp/lab/lab_girls_21.php

Reina Kubo (久保玲奈, Kubo Reina; born October 28, 1999) is a Japanese singer. She was a former member and leader of Prizmmy, a Japanese dance and vocal unit under Avex Pictures. She is a first and third generation member of Roni Girls, a Japanese children's clothing brand. She appeared on The Karaoke Battle U-18, and was the runner-up on LDH's The Girls Audition.

== Early life ==
Born in Saitama Prefecture, she is the eldest of the two children in her family. She began to dance at age 3 and participated in many dance performances before she debuted.

Reina passed her college entrance exams on November 8, 2017. Kubo studied at the Komazawa University Department of Global Media Studies, graduating in March 2023 after taking a leave of absence for a year to participate in Girls Planet 999.

== Career ==
She became a member of ChibikkoAAA on March 25, 2009 a mini version of the group AAA. She portrayed Misako Uno, one of two female members.

She participated in Kirachalle on July 25, 2009, in the modelling department.

Reina was also a first and third generation Roni Girl. Her former Prizmmy members Mia Kusakabe, Karin Takahashi, and Hina Miyazaki were also brand models and dancers. They had dance performances while they modeled for the clothing they performed in. She was a first generation Dance Style Kid.

In 2011, Reina was 1 of 3 girls featured for anime Pretty Rhythm where she portrayed a trainee who learned fashion, dancing and singing with the aim to debut. In 2012 she hosted the second and third seasons of the series Pretty Rhythm: Dear My Future and Pretty Rhythm: Rainbow Live appearing at the end of the anime with Prizmmy and their sister group Prism Mates.

=== 2012–2017: Prizmmy ===
Reina debuted as the leader of Prizmmy on March 16, 2012, with the song "Everybody's Gonna be Happy" which was also the fourth ending of the anime Pretty Rhythm: Aurora Dream. When the second season of Pretty Rhythm aired, she was given an anime version like the other members and was named Reina Miyama, who was one of the season's main characters.

She released 12 singles, 1 mini album and 3 albums with Prizmmy.

On December 9, 2016, along with Prizmmy members and Prism Mates, they announced that the group would disband in March 2017. They finally disbanded on March 31, 2017, following their sold-out performance on March 30. Their last album "Prizmmy☆ THE BEST!!" was released on February 22, 2017.

=== 2017–present: solo activities ===
Reina left Avex and became a freelance artist, performing as a backup dancer for various releases by Meik. She participated in Kanjani's The Mozart No. 1 Music King Final Participation(関ジャニ∞のTheモーツァルト 音楽王No. 1決定戦 出場).

In December 2017 Reina appeared on Tonight, the birth! Music Champion Finalists! (今夜、誕生！音楽チャンプ 決勝戦出場). Later that month she appeared alongside former Prism Mates member Runa Suzuki in Gene High National Youth Dance Cup (GENE高 全国青春ダンスカップ).

In early 2018, Reina appeared with Runa again on After School Swag performing the song "I Love You" by Chris Hart.

In July 2018, Reina appeared on The Karaoke Battle (THE★カラオケバトル (全日本大学生歌うま王決定戦)) winning second place.

She also performed in Miyoshimatsuri in early September.

In early September Reina participated in LDH's The Girls Audition in the vocal and dance department. She got into the last judging round but ended up as the runner-up.

On December 4, EXPG Lab announced that Reina had joined EXPG Lab Vocal. She also revealed via EXPG LAB's Official Instagram that she would join EXPG'S REX THE LIVE on December.

From 2018 to 2019, Reina was a backup dancer at EXILE LIVE TOUR 2018–2019 "STAR OF WISH".

In July 2021, It was revealed that Reina would be participating in Mnet's survival show Girls Planet 999 as a contestant. It started airing on August 6, 2021. She was eliminated in episode eight and finished tenth in J-Group.

== Filmography ==
=== TV appearances ===
Year	Name	Notes
2011–2012	Pretty Rhythm: Aurora Dream	Trainee with Mia and Karin. Ayami soon followed
2012–2013	Pretty Rhythm: Dear My Future	The whole anime was based on Prizmmy☆ and their 'rival' group Puretty. They appeared in the end along with Prism Mates and Puretty.
2013–2014	Pretty Rhythm: Rainbow Live	Appearing in a couple of episodes for "Pretty Rhythm Club" where they would play games.
2017	関ジャニ∞のTheモーツァルト 音楽王No. 1決定戦 出場	
2017	今夜、誕生！音楽チャンプ 決勝戦出場	
2018	THE★カラオケバトル	2nd-place winner
2018	The Girls Audition Summer Camp	Finalist
2021	Girls Planet 999	Eliminated in episode 8 and finished tenth in J-Group

=== Music video appearances ===
Year	Name	Note
2017	Meik – IN DA WORLD	Back-up dancer
2017	Meik – Koi suru	Back-up dancer
2018	Meik – Feeling Good	Back-up dancer
2019	Generation from Exile Tribe – EXPerience Greatness	Back-up dancer

== Discography ==
Year	Title	Artist
2021	LUX 107.7 POWERMIX (Note: As a vocal feature)	SEGA SAMMY LUX
2021	Lose Control (Note: As a vocal feature)	SEGA SAMMY LUX
