= Karin Takahashi =

Karin Takahashi may refer to:

- Karin Takahashi (singer) (born 2000), Japanese singer
- Karin Takahashi (voice actress) (born 1994), Japanese voice actress
