= Boy Meets Girl (song) =

1994 single by TRF

Single by TRF

from the album Billionaire: Boy Meets Girl
- Released: June 22, 1994
- Recorded: 1994
- Genre: J-pop
- Label: Avex Entertainment
- Songwriter: Tetsuya Komuro
- Producer: Tetsuya Komuro

TRF singles chronology
"Survival Dance (No No Cry More)" (1994)	"Boy Meets Girl" (1994)	"Crazy Gonna Crazy" (1995)

Music video
- "Boy Meets Girl" on YouTube

"Boy Meets Girl" (stylized as "BOY MEETS GIRL") is a song by Japanese band TRF. The song was released on June 22, 1994, as their seventh single.

== Background and release ==
"Boy Meets Girl" was written and produced by Tetsuya Komuro. It is inspired by Eurobeat music, and it is composed of synths at 135 BPM. The song was featured in a Coca-Cola commercial. The single was first released on June 22, 1994, and then re-released on November 29, 2006. The fourth track on the single, "Boy Meets Girl (Twilight Mix "Tribute to Ayrton Senna")", is a tribute to Ayrton Senna after his death in 1994.

== Reception ==
"Boy Meets Girl" peaked at #3 on Oricon Weekly Singles Chart. The song is one of TRF and Tetsuya Komuro's most identifiable songs and is credited for being one of the first to introduce the Japanese public to dance music.

== Track listing ==
All tracks are written by Tetsuya Komuro.

No.	Title	Lyrics	Music	Arrangement	Length
1.	"Boy Meets Girl" (Radio on Air Mix)	Tetsuya Komuro	Tetsuya Komuro	Tetsuya Komuro
2.	"Boy Meets Girl" (Dance 12" Mix)	Tetsuya Komuro	Tetsuya Komuro	Tetsuya Komuro
3.	"Boy Meets Girl" (Tribal Mix "Japanese Traditional")	Tetsuya Komuro	Tetsuya Komuro	Tetsuya Komuro
4.	"Boy Meets Girl" (Twilight Mix "Tribute to Ayrton Senna")	Tetsuya Komuro	Tetsuya Komuro	Tetsuya Komuro

== In popular culture ==
A remix titled "Boy Meets Girl (Da! Da! Da! Remix)" was featured as the ending theme to the 2000 anime series UFO Baby. The single was released on August 23, 2000.

== Cover versions ==
The song was covered by World Order on their self-titled debut album.

=== Pretty Rhythm versions ===
"Boy Meets Girl"

Single by Prizmmy
- Released: May 22, 2013
- Recorded: 2013
- Genre: J-pop
- Label: Avex Entertainment
- Songwriter: Tetsuya Komuro
- Producer: Tetsuya Komuro

Prizmmy singles chronology
"Pump it Up!" (2013)	"Boy Meets Girl" (2013)	"EZ Do Dance" (2013)

Music video
- "Boy Meets Girl" on YouTube

Japanese girl group Prizmmy released a cover of "EZ Do Dance" as their 8th single on July 24, 2013, in collaboration between Avex Pictures and the Pretty Rhythm franchise to honor TRF's 20th anniversary. The song served as the first opening theme song to the anime series Pretty Rhythm: Rainbow Live. The single charted at #79 on the Oricon Weekly Singles Chart.

Over the Rainbow, side characters from Pretty Rhythm: Rainbow Live, also provided a cover of "Boy Meets Girl" on their first album. The song was performed by the characters Kouji Mihama (voiced by Tetsuya Kakihara), Hiro Hayami (voiced by Tomoaki Maeno), and Kazuki Nishina (voiced by Toshiki Masuda). The song was also performed by Koji Kominami, Taishi Sugie, Takuto Omi in the stage play adaptation, King of Prism: Over the Sunshine!
