= EZ Do Dance =

1993 single by TRF

Single by TRF

from the album EZ Do Dance
- A-side: "EZ Do Dance"
- B-side: "Do What You Want"
- Released: June 21, 1993
- Recorded: 1993
- Genre: J-pop, dance
- Label: Avex Entertainment
- Songwriter: Tetsuya Komuro
- Producer: Tetsuya Komuro

TRF singles chronology
"Going to Dance / Open Your Mind" (1993)	"EZ Do Dance" (1993)	"Ai ga Mou Sukoshi Hoshii yo" (1993)

Music video
- "EZ Do Dance" on YouTube

"EZ Do Dance" (stylized in all caps) is a song by the Japanese band TRF. It was released on June 21, 1993, as the band's second single. It was TRF's breakthrough hit and is credited with helping to popularize underground dance music among the general Japanese public.

The song was given the Music Video Award at the 35th Japan Record Awards and has been used in video games such as Dance Dance Revolution X2 and Just Dance Wii U. "EZ Do Dance" also crossed over to the anime communities, where it is used as both the theme and insert songs in the Pretty Rhythm series and its spin-off, King of Prism.

== Background and release ==
"EZ Do Dance" was written and produced by Tetsuya Komuro. He was the lead member of TM Network, which had combined Yellow Magic Orchestra's techno-pop style with rock music. He became interested in underground electronic dance music when he visited London during the Second Summer of Love in 1988 and was exposed to underground techno and house music, which he began introducing to Tokyo dance floors. He also drew influence from Eurobeat. The song is composed at 140 BPM.

The song was a tie-in for Bristol Meyers' Sea Breeze shampoo commercials. The single was first released on June 21, 1993, and re-released on November 29, 2006. "EZ Do Dance" was also the title track of TRF's second studio album of the same name.

== Reception ==
"EZ Do Dance" peaked at #15 on Oricon Weekly Singles Chart and sold approximately 780,000 copies, making it TRF's breakthrough hit. The song is one of TRF and Tetsuya Komuro's most identifiable songs and is credited with helping to introduce the regular Japanese public to underground dance music. It was influential on J-pop music in the 1990s.

Billboard's Hits of the World ranked the single at #10 in Japan in early 1994.

According to Dennis Smith, a major factor in the popularity and success of "EZ Do Dance" was its music video. Described as "sexy" and "energetic", it showcases Yuki dancing in tight-fitting shorts that contrast sharply against her tan skin color. Smith wrote that the music video inspired him to buy the single.

== Remix ==
A remix produced by Yasutaka Nakata, titled "EZ Do Dance retracked by Yasutaka Nakata (Capsule)" was included in TRF's 2013 tribute album.

== Track listing ==
All tracks are written by Tetsuya Komuro.

No.	Title	Lyrics	Music	Arrangement	Length
1.	"EZ Do Dance" (7" Mix)	Tetsuya Komuro	Tetsuya Komuro	Tetsuya Komuro	4:26
2.	"EZ Do Dance" (Instrumental)	Tetsuya Komuro	Tetsuya Komuro	Tetsuya Komuro	4:26
3.	"Do What You Want"	Tetsuya Komuro, Suzi Kim	Tetsuya Komuro	Tetsuya Komuro	4:39
Total length:					12:31

== Awards and nominations ==
Year	Award	Category	Result
1993	35th Japan Record Award	Music Video Award	Won

== In popular culture ==
"EZ Do Dance" is a playable song in arcade versions of Dance Dance Revolution, from DDR X2 to the 2014 edition of DDR. The song was removed from the latter on July 3, 2015. DJ Koo, the frontman of TRF, released the Dance Dance Revolution 20th Anniversary Non Stop Mix album on March 3, 2019, with "EZ Do Dance" as the final song.

The song is also included in Just Dance Wii U. An instrumental version of the song was used in the 1998 racing game JGTC All Japan Grand Touring Car Championship.

== Cover versions ==
Japanese singer Saori@destiny released a cover version of the song on her mini-album, Wow War Techno, in 2009. Japanese co-ed group Dream5 released a cover version as part of its sixth single, a double A-side titled "I My Me Mine" / "EZ Do Dance", on May 2, 2012. The song was used in Ito-Yokado's "Dancing Good Day" commercial and the single charted at #19 on the Oricon Weekly Singles Chart.

=== Pretty Rhythm versions ===
"EZ Do Dance"

Single by Prizmmy
- A-side: "EZ Do Dance"
- B-side: "Party Party"
- Released: July 24, 2013
- Recorded: 2013
- Genre: J-pop
- Label: Avex Entertainment
- Songwriter: Tetsuya Komuro
- Producer: Tetsuya Komuro

Prizmmy singles chronology
"Boy Meets Girl" (2013)	"EZ Do Dance" (2013)	"Crazy Gonna Crazy" (2013)

Music video
- "EZ Do Dance" on YouTube

The Japanese girl group Prizmmy released a cover version of "EZ Do Dance" as its eighth single on July 24, 2013, in a collaboration between Avex Pictures and the Pretty Rhythm franchise to honor TRF's 20th anniversary. It was the second opening theme song to the anime series Pretty Rhythm: Rainbow Live. The single charted at #84 on the Oricon Weekly Singles Chart.

Following the release, "EZ Do Dance" has continued to be used in the Pretty Rhythm franchise, especially in the King of Prism spin-offs. The song was covered by DJ Coo (voiced by Shotaro Morikubo) under the title "EZ Do Dance (DJ Coo ver.)", the character being based on DJ Koo from TRF.

A remix of the song, titled "EZ Do Dance (K.O.P. Mix)", was used in the 2016 anime film King of Prism by Pretty Rhythm as a battle song between Kazuki Nishina (voiced by Toshiki Masuda) and Alexander Yamato (voiced by Shunsuke Takeuchi). The song was also performed in the stage adaptation King of Prism: Over the Sunshine!, where it was performed by Takuto Omi as Kazuki and Spi as Alexander.

A reprise titled "EZ Do Dance (Thunder Storm ver.)" appeared in the sequel film, King of Prism: Pride the Hero, where it was performed by the characters Taiga Kougami (voiced by Tasuku Hatanaka) and Alexander Yamato (voiced by Shunsuke Takeuchi).

As an April Fool's joke in 2019, Buster Bros!!! from the multimedia project Hypnosis Mic: Division Rap Battle released a parody of the song titled "EZ Do Rap" as a "diss track" to the King of Prism anime series, which received over 100,000 retweets on Twitter.
