= Crazy Gonna Crazy =

1995 song by Japanese band TRF

Single by TRF

from the album Dance to Positive
- Released: January 1, 1995
- Recorded: 1994
- Genre: J-pop
- Label: Avex Entertainment
- Songwriter: Tetsuya Komuro
- Producer: Tetsuya Komuro

TRF singles chronology
"Boy Meets Girl" (1994)	"Crazy Gonna Crazy" (1995)	"Masquerade" (1995)

Music video
- "Crazy Gonna Crazy" on YouTube

"Crazy Gonna Crazy" (stylized as "CRAZY GONNA CRAZY") is a song by Japanese band TRF. The song was released on January 1, 1995, as their 8th single.

== Background and release ==
"Crazy Gonna Crazy" was written and produced by Tetsuya Komuro. "Crazy Gonna Crazy" was released as the theme song to the show Gaman Dekinai! The single first was released on January 1, 1995, and then re-released on November 29, 2006.

== Reception ==
"Crazy Gonna Crazy" peaked at #1 on Oricon Weekly Singles Chart and sold approximately 11.4 million copies combined with "EZ Do Dance."

== Track listing ==
All tracks are written by Tetsuya Komuro.

No.	Title	Lyrics	Music	Arrangement	Length
1.	"Crazy Gonna Crazy"	Tetsuya Komuro	Tetsuya Komuro	Tetsuya Komuro	5:59
2.	"Crazy Gonna Crazy" (Disco Mix)	Tetsuya Komuro	Tetsuya Komuro	Tetsuya Komuro	7:00
3.	"Crazy Gonna Crazy" (Eurobeat Mix)	Tetsuya Komuro	Tetsuya Komuro	Tetsuya Komuro	7:00
Total length:					19:59

== Cover versions ==
=== Pretty Rhythm versions ===
"Crazy Gonna Crazy"

Single by Prizmmy
- Released: October 30, 2013
- Recorded: 2013
- Genre: J-pop
- Label: Avex Entertainment
- Songwriter: Tetsuya Komuro
- Producer: Tetsuya Komuro

Prizmmy singles chronology
"EZ Do Dance" (2013)	"Crazy Gonna Crazy" (2013)	"Butterfly Effect" (2014)

Music video
- "Crazy Gonna Crazy" on YouTube

Japanese girl group Prizmmy released a cover of "Crazy Gonna Crazy" as their 9th single on October 30, 2013, in collaboration between Avex Pictures and the Pretty Rhythm franchise to honor TRF's 20th anniversary. The song served as the third opening theme song to the anime series Pretty Rhythm: Rainbow Live. The single charted at #71 on the Oricon Weekly Singles Chart.

Following the release, "Crazy Gonna Crazy" has continued to be featured in the Pretty Rhythm franchise, especially in the King of Prism spin-offs. A version of the song appeared in the film King of Prism: Pride the Hero where it was performed by the characters Shin Ichijo (voiced by Junta Terashima) and Louis Kisaragi (voiced by Shouta Aoi).
