= Pretty Rhythm: Dear My Future =

Japanese anime television series

プリティーリズム・ディアマイフューチャー (Puritī Rizumu Dia Mai Fyūchā)
- Genre: Sports (Figure skating)
- Video game
- Developer: Syn Sophia
- Publisher: Takara Tomy Arts
- Genre: Rhythm, dress-up
- Platform: Arcade
- Released: JP: April 26, 2012
- Anime television series
- Directed by: Masakazu Hishida
- Written by: Deko Akao
- Music by: Seiko Nagaoka
- Studio: Tatsunoko Production; Dong Woo Animation
- Original network: TXN (TV Tokyo)
- English network: SEA: Animax Asia
- Original run: April 7, 2012 – March 30, 2013
- Episodes: 51
- See also
- Pretty Rhythm: Aurora Dream (2011); Pretty Rhythm: All Star Selection (2014)

Pretty Rhythm: Dear My Future (プリティーリズム・ディアマイフューチャー, Puritī Rizumu: Dia Mai Fyūchā) is a 2012 Japanese anime television series by Tatsunoko Production and Avex Pictures in cooperation with Takara Tomy Arts and Syn Sophia, based on the arcade game of the same name. It is the second anime in the Pretty Rhythm franchise, focusing on a group of Japanese and Korean idols known as Prism Stars that combine music with fashion and figure skating. The anime was created as a tie-in series to promote the arcade game of the same name.

Pretty Rhythm: Dear My Future is a sequel to the 2011 anime series Pretty Rhythm: Aurora Dream and was written in an attempt to launch the Pretty Rhythm franchise in South Korea. The series features fictional characters based on Prizmmy and Puretty, with the latter group making their Japanese and South Korean debut through the show.

During the anime's run, each episode ended with a live action segment titled "Pretty Rhythm Studio" hosted by Prizmmy, along with its sister trainee group Prism Mates. Afterwards, it was succeeded by Pretty Rhythm: Rainbow Live in 2013.

== Plot ==
=== Setting ===
Pretty Rhythm: Dear My Future is set three years after Pretty Rhythm: Aurora Dream in Odaiba, Japan. The series focuses on Prism Stars, who are idols performing figure skating routines through a combination of fashion, song, and dance, with special moves called Prism Jumps and heart-shaped stones called Prism Stones to accessorize. Prism Shows have a new system called Prism Act and Fan Calls. Fan Calls are votes provided by the audience on their phone throughout the duration of a show. A Prism Act is a special finishing move featuring an acting performance that is achieved by landing perfect Prism Jumps and earning the highest amount of Fan Calls.

=== Synopsis ===
Mia Ageha decides to join Pretty Top School in order to challenge Aira Harune, the current Prism Queen. Mia, along with fellow trainees Reina Miyama, Karin Shijimi, and Ayami Ōruri, debut as Prizmmy. At the same time, Pretty Top School (owned by Kyoko Asechi) gains five international students from South Korea — Hye-in, Shi-yoon, Jae-eun, Chae-kyoung, and So-min — who debut as Puretty. While keeping up with their idol activities, both groups also enter the Symphonia Series tournaments, with prizes consisting of rare Prism Stones consisting various clothing from the Symphonia Series, a line created by Kintaro Asechi. In the process, they learn how to perform Prism Acts, a finishing move at the end of a Prism Show that includes a short acting performance.

As Prizmmy and Puretty's skills grow, Don Bomby, the host of the Symphonia Series, manipulates Pretty Top School into entering them into more Symphonia Series tournaments. Revealing himself as Kintaro Asechi, he hopes to realize his dream of performing "Grateful Symphonia", an ultimate Prism Act that will change the landscape of Prism Shows and end the need for competitive tournaments. Kintaro targets Aira as the performer of "Grateful Symphonia" and begins sniping all Prism Stars who lose against her to be in his company. Wanting to combat him, the outfits from the Symphonia Series tournaments are remade with purer thoughts to help Prizmmy and Puretty defeat Aira in the Sky High Symphonia tournament.

After Pretty Top School and Aira are saved, Kintaro sabotages Kyoko's reputation by revealing he used his connections to influence her Prism Star career in the past, and this causes Prism Shows to lose popularity. In order to heal Kintaro and change the public's favor, the acts at Pretty Top School agree to perform "Grateful Symphonia." The Grateful Symphonia tournament is held to decide the center dance position in "Grateful Symphonia", but Mia and Hye-in tie, and Pretty Top School decides to perform "Grateful Symphonia" for the Goddess of the Prism Shows to decide. During "Grateful Symphonia", Kintaro intervenes, but Mia convinces him that competitive Prism Shows and her friendly rivalry with Hye-in motivate her to grow as a better performer. Mia and Hye-in's friendship causes the Goddess to crown them both as the centers, and together, the acts at Pretty Top School complete the "Grateful Symphonia" and Prism Shows are saved. Afterwards, the characters move on with their lives and careers.

== Characters ==
==== Prizmmy ====
Prizmmy is a Prism Star group consisting of Mia Ageha, Reina Miyama, Karin Shijimi, and Ayami Ōruri. They are the main characters in Pretty Rhythm: Dear My Future. These characters are based on the real life girl group Prizmmy. All of them first made cameo appearances in episode 50 of Aurora Dream. Their Prism Acts are "Miracle Idol Wake Up!" and "Road to Symphonia".

Mia Ageha (上葉 みあ, Ageha Mia)
Voiced by: Rumi Ōkubo
Mia is a lively fourteen-year-old girl based on Mia Kusakabe. Determined to surpass Aira Harune, Mia tries her best and never gives up on reaching her goal, which she tries to fulfill by getting into Pretty Top. Mia has feelings for Prism Ace, but is unaware of his true identity. Her catchphrase is "Mia is number one!"
Mia's Prism jumps are "Kirameki Future Star", "Stardust Shower", "Kirameki Future Star Evolution", "Kirameki Future Star Evolution 2", "Kirameki Future Star Evolution 3", "Kirameki Future Star Evolution 4", and "Kirameki Future Star Evolution 5". Her Prism acts are "Act Trying" and "Symphonia of Passion".
Reina Miyama (深山 れいな, Miyama Reina)
Voiced by: Natsumi Takamori
Reina is a sensible fourteen-year-old girl based on Reina Kubo. She often keeps Mia grounded and has feelings for Itsuki Harune, Aira's younger brother.
Reina's Prism jumps are "Crystal Splash", and "Heart-Throbbing Experience", "Heartful Splash", "Bloom-Bloom-Blooming Love Flowers", "Lovely Perfume Splash", "Love Explosion", "Sweet Honey-Chu Kiss", and "Heartbeat Memory Hug". Her Prism act is "Acting Trying".
Karin Shijimi (志々美 かりん, Shijimi Karin)
Voiced by: Minami Tsuda
Karin is a thirteen-year-old girl based on Karin Takahashi. With a candid personality, she makes everyone around her cheer up. Karin enjoys dancing and has eight younger brothers. She causes a lot of trouble for others but is still thoughtful.
Karin's Prism jumps are "Heartful Splash Perfect", "Crystal Splash", "Fun Fun Heart Dive", "Galactical Galaxy Shower", and "Galactical Galaxy Dive" (Episode 44). Her Prism act is "Acting Trying".
Ayami Ōruri (大瑠璃 あやみ, Ōruri Ayami)
Voiced by: Ayane Sakura
Ayami is a shy twelve-year-old girl based on Ayami Sema. Although she is shy, she can be quite courageous. She enjoys fashion and often takes notes on her notepad. Her catchphrase is "Taking notes!"
Ayami's Prism jumps are "Lovely Rainbow", "Miss Fairy Girl", "Shining Love Cupid", and "World Love Cupid". Her Prism act is "Acting Trying".

=== Puretty ===
Puretty (ピュリティ, Pyuriti; Pretty in the arcade game) is a Prism Star group from South Korea who are in Japan on a study-abroad program at Pretty Top. The group consists of Hye-in, So-min, Shi-yoon, Chae-kyung, and Jae-eun, who are the main characters in Pretty Rhythm: Dear My Future. The characters are based on the real-life girl group Puretty. Their Prism acts are "Night Flower Fever" and "We Love Prism Show".

Hye-in (ヘイン, He-in)
Voiced by: Kanae Itō
Hye-in is a 15-year-old girl based on Yoo Hye-in. She is Mia's childhood friend and has a lively, hard-working personality. She becomes interested in Symphonia Series and is willing to help Yunsu with his dream by sponsoring him. She enjoys exercising to increase her stamina. Despite not winning the festival herself, Hye-in wins MVP and the Symphonia Dress at the Symphonia Summer Festival.
Hye-in's Prism jumps are "Golden Spiral", "Golden Star Illusion", and "Platinum Spiral". Her Prism acts are "Night Flower Fever" and "Symphonia of Starry Sky".
So-min (ソミン)
Voiced by: Marie Miyake
So-min is a fourteen-year-old girl based on Jeon So-min. She has a stubborn sense of justice and has won numerous trophies. So-min is in love with Yun-su. As a child, she loved the ocean but became frightened after drifting too far into it; with Yun-su's advice, she can overcome this fear.
So-min's Prism jumps are "Stardust Shower", "Heart-Throbbing", "Pink Dolphin Venus Perfect", and "Sky".
Shi-yoon (シユン, Shi-yun)
Voiced by: Kim Hyang-ri
Shi-yoon is a sixteen-year-old girl based on Cho Shi-yoon. She acts as a big sister to her team and works at her own pace. Shi-yoon is very kind and docile, but terrible when she is angry.
Shi Yoon's Prism jumps are "Colorful Choco Parade", "King of Jungle", and "Earth".
Chae-kyung (チェギョン, Che-gyon)
Voiced by: Satomi Akesaka
Chae-kyung is a 16-year-old girl based on Yoon Chae-kyung. Coming from a wealthy family, she has a problem with thinking she can solve everything with money. Most of Puretty's expenses are paid by Chae-kyung and her family. Chae-kyung's mother was an actress who she wanted to make her proud by becoming one. However, after winning the film audition as well as having to choose between being an actress and a Prism Star, Chae-kyung realized that being a Prism Star makes her happy.
Chae-kyung's Prism jumps are "Pop'n Candy Rocket", "Crystal Splash", "Gorgeous Jewelry Paradise", "Fly High Cheer Girl", "Celebrity Jewelry Paradise", and "Sea".
Jae-eun (ジェウン, Je-un)
Voiced by: Madoka Yonezawa
At thirteen years old, Jae-eun is the youngest girl in the study abroad team. Based on Jeon Jae-eun, she is honest yet airheaded and clumsy. Jae-eun falls in love easily with boys she thinks are handsome.
Jae-eun's Prism jumps are "Colorful Choco Parade", "Paku-Paku Love Earth", "Fly High Cheer Girl", and "Sun".

=== Supporting characters ===
==== Love-Mix ====
Love-Mix is a Prism Star duo composed of Itsuki Harune and Yong-hwa who debut in Dear My Future. Their duo jump is "Lovely Marionette" and their Prism act is "Love Mix Concerto".

Itsuki Harune (春音 いつき, Harune Itsuki)
Voiced by: Motoko Kumai
Itsuki is Aira's fourteen-year-old younger brother who often teases her. He helps keeps her secret about being in Prism Shows from their family. Itsuki is interested in those despite not watching many of them, but later debuts as a Prism Star in Dear My Future. He is oblivious to Reina's affections for him, but eventually returns her feelings at the end of said series. In the future, Itsuki became a sports teacher after graduating from college.
Yong-hwa (ヨンファ, Yon-fa)
Voiced by: Minami Takayama
Yong-hwa is a Prism Star from the same office as Puretty and is a childhood friend of Chae-kung and Yunsu. He is popular with women and knowledgeable about people's romantic feelings, calling his intuition a "Heart Shuffle". In the future, he becomes a popular actor.

==== Dear Crown ====
Yun-su (ユンス)
Voiced by: Wataru Hatano
Yunsu is the owner of Dear Crown, a fashion and Prism Stone store right next to Shō's in Pretty Rhythm: Dear My Future. He is not liked at all by Shō, not because he is his rival in business, but because he is his rival in love. Yunsu has great respect for Aira and considers her as his muse or goddess. The clothes he designs are different from Shō's, according to Aira, because they are not cute but rather sexy and chic. His sister is Chae Kyung and he receives the affections of So Min. In the future, remains a designer.
Mi-sil (ミシル, Mi-shiru)
Voiced by: Tōko Aoyama
Mi-sil is the dance instructor of Puretty and president of their management, Dear Princess.

==== Pair Charms ====
Mimmy (ミーミ, Mīmi)
Voiced by: Rumi Ōkubo
Mimmy is Mia's Pair Charm who is usually seen as Mia's head accessory during Prism Shows.
Remmy (レミー, Remī)
Voiced by: Natsumi Takamori
Remmy is Reina's Pair Charm who always acts serious and impatient.
Rimmy (リミー, Rimī)
Voiced by: Minami Tsuda
Rimmy is Karin's Pair Charm who is always sleepy.
Yammy (ヤミー, Yamī)
Voiced by: Ayane Sakura
Yammy is Ayami's Pair Charm who is always focused on food and eating.
Vivvy (ビビ, Bibi)
Voiced by: Susumu Chiba
Vivvy is the Pair Charm of the entire Puretty team who is attached to Hye-in during Prism shows. She is cheeky when she talks. Vivvy also has a tendency to scratch Penguin Teacher whenever he appears.

== Media ==
=== Game ===
Beginning with season 9, the Pretty Rhythm: Aurora Dream arcade game was relaunched under the name Pretty Rhythm: Dear My Future on April 26, 2012, to coincide with the anime adaptation tie-in. The season 9 update, titled "Prizmmy Debut Edition", added Mia Ageha, Reina Miyama, Karin Shijimi, and Ayami Ōruri, as playable characters. The game featured a new system that focuses on "Prism Acts", which is a bonus round achieved by having perfect Prism Jumps. Season 10, "Puretty Debut Edition", was launched on July 19, 2012, adding Hye-in, So-min, Shi-yoon, Chae-kyung, and Jae-eun as playable characters. Season 11, "Dear My Future Team Shuffle Edition", was launched on September 27, 2012.

=== Anime ===
Pretty Rhythm: Dear My Future aired between April 7, 2012, and March 30, 2013, as a direct sequel to Pretty Rhythm: Aurora Dream. In an attempt to market the franchise to South Korea, SBS Viacom joined the production as a subsidiary. The animation was co-produced by Tatsunoko Production and Dong Woo Animation. The series features fictional characters based on the girl group Prizmmy as the main cast. An upcoming girl group tentatively named "DSP Girls", later named Puretty, debuted through the show with characters based on the members appearing as the secondary cast, with the real-life members also appearing in the live-action segments.

A live-action variety show segment titled "Pretty Rhythm Studio" appeared in every episode, hosted by MC Kensaku, the real-life members of Prizmmy, and a new set of trainees from Avex Dance Master known as the Prism Mates. In the Korean dub of the series, the "Charming School at Prism Stone" (프리즘스톤과 함께하는 차밍스쿨) live-action skits aired instead of "Pretty Rhythm Studio", with the real-life members of Puretty starring in them.

The English dub for Pretty Rhythm: Dear My Future was broadcast on Animax Asia beginning April 14, 2014, for Southeast Asian distribution.

=== Manga ===
A manga adaptation illustrated by Michiyo Kikuta was serialized in Pucchigumi.

=== Merchandise ===
A Prism Stone shop opened in Venus Fort in Odaiba, Japan, where the series takes place to coincide with the launch of Dear My Future. Dear Crown, a brand introduced in Dear My Future, also opened its flagship store at the same location. In February 2013, plans for both Prism Stone and Dear Crown shops to open in South Korea were announced as a tie-in to Pretty Rhythm: Dear My Future airing in the country, but the shops never opened.
