= Mia Kusakabe =

Japanese singer (born 2000)

- 日下部美愛
- Born: March 9, 2000 (age 26); Tokyo, Japan
- Years active: 2012–present
- Height: 167 cm (5 ft 6 in)
- Musical career
- Genre: J-pop
- Instrument: Vocals
- Years active: 2012–present
- Labels: Avex (former); ING (former); Jungle International

Mia Kusakabe (日下部美愛, Kusakabe Mia; born March 9, 2000) is a Japanese actress, singer, model. She was a member of the girl group Prizmmy before their disbandment in 2017.

== Career ==
In 2008, Mia participated in Ciao Girls Audition. She was a 3rd generation Roni Girl member along with Karin Takahashi, Reina Kubo, and Hina Miyazaki. Mia is also a 3rd generation "Dance Style Kids" and has modeled for Nico Puchi.

Kusakabe debuted as the Fashion Leader (sub-leader) of Prizmmy on March 16, 2012, with the single "Everybody's Gonna Be Happy". Prizmmy members were regularly cast at the endings of the Pretty Rhythm series. After the group disbanded, Mia was became a member of Law of R on NHK E before the show's cancellation.

On January 23, 2018, it was revealed that Kusakabe was the motion capture for Mia Hanazono in Idol Time PriPara, performing the Prizmmy song "Dear My Future". In September 2026, she was added as member of the girl group Tohkei.<refTohkei・日下部美愛、ショートヘア姿を披露！イメチェンした姿にファン絶賛「バチクソ可愛い」. WWS Channel (in Japanese). September 12, 2026.</ref>

== Filmography ==
Year	Name	Network	Roles	Notes
2011	Pretty Rhythm: Aurora Dream	TV Tokyo	herself	Live Action segments
2012	Pretty Rhythm: Dear My Future	TV Tokyo	herself	Live Action segments
2013	Pretty Rhythm: Rainbow Live	TV Tokyo	herself	Live Action segments
2016	Law of R	NHK		Regular; broadcast ends due to casting issues
2018	Komachi's Rap School	BS Nippon		
2020	Asoviva (β)		MC	Radio
2020	Mia Kusakabe Enjou Answer		MC	Radio
2020	FM Yokohama Mix		Assistant MC	Radio
2021	Nigeru wa Haji da ga Yaku ni Tatsu	TBS	Mina Yoshida	Drama

=== Stage Plays ===
Year	Name	Role	Notes
2016	Good Night, Jack the Ripper	Little Red Riding Hood	Cast alongside Karin Takahashi Jack the Ripper (April 20) Stride (July 6–10)
2016	Stride		Cast alongside Karin Takahashi Jack the Ripper (April 20) Stride (July 6–10)
2016	Houkago Senki}		October 5–10
2017	Wake Up Girls! Aoba no Kiroku	Tina Kobayakawa	January 19–22
2017	Haru no Mezame	Tea	May 5–23
2018	Wake Up Girls! Aoba no Kiseki	Tina Kobayakawa	June 6–10
2018	Alice in Deadly School Paradise	Mizuki Tsuujii	August 8–19
2018	Atashi wo Kurae	Hilda	Team B (Vegetarian) September 18–22
2018	Stray Sheep Paradise	Reina	December 12–16
2018	Donor Eleven	Maya Shoubu	December 19–30
2019	Kaede Sou	Heroine; Maiha Toji	April 3–7
