= Prizmmy =

Japanese girl group

- Also known as: Prizmmy & Prism Mates
- Origin: Japan
- Genres: J-pop
- Years active: 2012–2017
- Label: Avex Entertainment
- Spinoffs: Prism Mates
- Past members: Ayami Sema (2012–2014); Reina Kubo (2012–2017); Mia Kusakabe (2012–2017); Karin Takahashi (2012–2017); Hina Miyazaki (2014–2017)
- Website: mv.avex.jp/prizmmy/index.html

Prizmmy (プリズミー☆, Purizumī; stylized as Prizmmy☆) was a Japanese girl group formed by Avex Pictures in 2012. The group debuted through the Pretty Rhythm anime series, where they hosted the live-action segments in each episode and later released their first song, "Everybody's Gonna Be Happy", on 16 March 2012 as one of the ending theme songs to Pretty Rhythm: Aurora Dream. Fictionalized versions of themselves appeared as the main cast of Pretty Rhythm: Dear My Future to promote their activities.

After the end of the Pretty Rhythm series, Prizmmy continued to perform theme songs to the series' successor, PriPara, joined with the trainee group Prism Mates as back-up performers. As a collective group, they performed under the name Prism Box. After PriPara ended, the group disbanded on 31 March 2017.

== History ==
=== 2011-2012: Debut ===
In 2011, Mia Kusakabe, Reina Kubo and Karin Takahashi were in a pre-debut trainee group called Prism Mates, where they would participate in the "Pretty Rhythm Studio" live-action segments at the end of each episode in Pretty Rhythm: Aurora Dream. The segments followed them training in dance, singing, and fashion sense for their debut, much like the main characters in the show. The members were all students from Avex Dance Master.

In 2012, Kusakabe, Kubo, and Takahashi debuted under the name Prizmmy, along with a fourth member, Ayami Sema. Sema was the winner of the Pretty Rhythm Award at the Kiratto Entertainment Challenge Contest 2011 Summer, who had also previously worked as an exclusive model for KiraPichi. Their debut single, "Everybody's Gonna Be Happy", was released on 16 March 2012 as the fourth ending theme song for Pretty Rhythm: Aurora Dream; the B-side, "Popple Heart", used in a commercial for the Popple Heart toy from Takara Tomy.

On 25 April 2012, Prizmmy released their second and third singles: "Dear My Future" and "My Transform", as the opening and ending theme songs to Pretty Rhythm: Dear My Future. "Party Driver", a B-side from "Dear My Future", was featured in the series as an insert song. Fictionalized versions of the members became the main cast of the series, while Prism Mates had reformed with a new generation of trainees to accompany Prizmmy in hosting the "Pretty Rhythm Studio" segments and appearing in their music videos as back-up dancers. On 29 August 2012, Prizmmy released their fourth single, "Brand New World!", as the second opening theme song to Pretty Rhythm: Dear My Future. Following the release, on 21 November 2012, they released their fifth single, "Body Rock", as the third ending theme song to Pretty Rhythm: Dear My Future.

=== 2013-2014: Prism Mates and Prism Box projects ===
On 20 February 2013, Prizmmy released their sixth single, "Pump it Up!", which was used as the fourth opening theme song for Pretty Rhythm: Dear My Future. For Pretty Rhythm: Rainbow Live, the third Pretty Rhythm anime series, Prizmmy collaborated with Prism Mates under the group name Prism Box; they released the song "RainBow × RainBow" as the first ending theme song on 24 April 2013. Prizmmy covered several songs by TRF as a collaboration between Avex Entertainment and the Pretty Rhythm series to honor TRF's 20th anniversary. "Boy Meets Girl" was released on 22 May 2013 as the first opening theme song to Pretty Rhythm: Rainbow Live. "EZ Do Dance" was released on 24 July 2013 as the second opening theme song, and "Crazy Gonna Crazy" was released on 30 October 2013 as the third opening theme song. Prizmmy also released their first studio album, Take Off!, on 24 July 2013, which contained original songs along with a solo by Karin Takahashi.

Near the end of the Pretty Rhythm: Rainbow Live, Prizmmy released "Butterfly Effect" as their tenth single and as the fourth opening theme song on 5 February 2014; the B-side, "Wanda", was used in an advertisement for Steppy. Grouped together with Prism Mates as Prism Box, they released the song "Happy Star Restaurant" as the final ending theme song on 26 February 2014. On 30 March 2014, Sema announced at the end of the final episode of Pretty Rhythm: Rainbow Live that she was leaving Prizmmy. She was replaced by Prism Mates member Hina Miyazaki on 5 April 2014.

=== 2014-2017: Final years and disbandment ===
In April 2014, Prizmmy and Prism Mates performed the ending theme song to the film Panpaka Pants The Movie: Secret of the Bananan Kingdom as Prism Box. On 25 June 2014, Prizmmy released their second studio album, Music Goes On, which also included songs performed by Prism Mates, as well as their digital singles released between 2013 and 2014. On 17 September 2014, Prizmmy released "Jumpin'! Dancin'!" as the first ending theme song to PriPara. On 26 November 2014, Prism Box released the single "Kiraki-Runway" as the third ending theme to PriPara.

On 18 February 2015, Prizmmy released the single "I Just Wanna Be With You (Virtual to Real no Hazama)" as the third ending theme song to PriPara. In the summer of 2015, Prizmmy participated in the Tokyo Idol Festival.

On 24 February 2016, Prizmmy released the song "Love Trooper" as a mini album, with the title track as an ending theme song to PriPara. On 9 December 2016, Prizmmy announced on a Showroom live-stream that they will disband on 31 March 2017, along with Prism Mates. After releasing their final album, Prizmmy The Best! on 22 February 2017, they held their final concert on 30 March 2017, "Hello My Future."

== Members ==
- Mia Kusakabe
- Reina Kubo
- Karin Takahashi
- Hina Miyazaki (宮崎妃夏) (former Prism Mates member, joined on 5 April 2014)
- Ayami Sema (瀬間彩海) (left on 30 March 2014)

=== Prism Mates ===
Prism Mates (プリズム☆メイツ, Purizumu Meitsu) was a pre-debut trainee group who accompanied Prizmmy as a supporting act. They appeared with Prizmmy in hosting the "Pretty Rhythm Studio" segments in Pretty Rhythm: Dear My Future and Pretty Rhythm: Rainbow Live. The members also appeared in their music videos as their back-up dancers. Prism Mates also made a cameo in episode 9 of Pretty Rhythm: Rainbow Live. At the time, the members' ages averaged around 11.2 years old.

From 2013 to 2014, members from Prism Mates released digital singles, which were later included on Prizmmy's second studio album, Music Goes On. Their first song as a group, "Zenshin Zenrei Go My Way!" was released on Prizmmy's mini album, Love Trooper. In 2015, a sub-unit consisting of Mirei Takahashi, Yuka Takayanagi, Momona Aoki, and Airi Hamamura called Prism Idol Kenkyūsei (プリズム☆アイドル研究生) released the single "Idol Kinryoku Lesson Go!" for PriPara. As a collective group, they released music with Prizmmy under the name Prism Box.

- Mirei Takahashi (髙橋実鈴)
- Yuka Takayanagi (高柳祐花)
- Momona Aoki (青木萌々菜)
- Airi Hamamura (浜村愛梨) (joined on 23 December 2013)
- Sana Ishii (石井紗那) (joined on 23 December 2013)
- Runa Suzuki (鈴木瑠奈) (left on 2 May 2015)
- Natsu Usukura (薄倉奈津) (left on 29 April 2016)
- Kanon Hagino (萩野伽音) (left on 29 April 2016)

== Discography ==
=== Studio albums ===
List of studio albums, with selected chart positions, sales figures and certifications
Title	Year	Album details	Peak chart positions		Sales
Title	Year	Album details	JPN		Sales
Title	Year	Album details	Oricon	Billboard Japan	Sales
As Prizmmy
Take Off!	2013	Released: 24 July 2013; Label: Avex Pictures; Formats: CD, digital download	163	—	—
As Prizmmy & Prism Mates
Music Goes On!	2014	Released: 25 June 2014; Label: Avex Pictures; Formats: CD, digital download	158	—	—
"—" denotes releases that did not chart or were not released in that region.

=== Extended plays ===
List of extended plays, with selected chart positions, sales figures and certifications
Title	Year	Album details	Peak chart positions		Sales
Title	Year	Album details	JPN		Sales
Title	Year	Album details	Oricon	Billboard Japan	Sales
Love Trooper	2016	Released: 24 February 2016; Label: Avex Pictures; Formats: CD, digital download	118	—	—
"—" denotes releases that did not chart or were not released in that region.

=== Compilation albums ===
List of studio albums, with selected chart positions, sales figures and certifications
Title	Year	Album details	Peak chart positions		Sales
Title	Year	Album details	JPN		Sales
Title	Year	Album details	Oricon	Billboard Japan	Sales
As Prizmmy & Prism Mates
Prizmmy The Best!	2017	Released: 22 February 2017; Label: Avex Pictures; Formats: CD, digital download	104	—	—
"—" denotes releases that did not chart or were not released in that region.

=== Singles ===
Title	Year	Peak chart positions			Sales	Album
Title	Year	JPN Oricon	JPN Hot	JPN Ani	Sales	Album
"Everybody's Gonna Be Happy"	2012	199	—	—	—	Take Off!
"Dear My Future" (未来の自分へ)	2012	—	—	—	—	Take Off!
"My Transform"	2012	—	—	—	—	Take Off!
"Brand New World"	2012	—	—	—	—	Take Off!
"Body Rock"	2012	—	—	—	—	Take Off!
"Pump it Up!" (パンピナッ！)	2013	—	—	—	—	Take Off!
"Boy Meets Girl"	2013	79	—	—	—	Music Goes On
"EZ Do Dance"	2013	84	—	—	—	Music Goes On
"Crazy Gonna Crazy"	2013	71	—	—	—	Music Goes On
"Butterfly Effect"	2014	117	—	—	—	Music Goes On
"Jumpin'! Dancin'!"	2014	81	—	—	—	Prizmmy The Best!
"I Just Wanna Be With You (Virtual to Real no Hazama)" (I Just Wanna Be With You ～仮想と真実の狭間で～)	2015	51	—	—	—	Prizmmy The Best!
"—" denotes releases that did not chart or were not released in that region.

==== Prism Mates singles ====
Title	Year	Peak chart positions			Sales	Album
Title	Year	JPN Oricon	JPN Hot	JPN Ani	Sales	Album
"Dancing Doctor" (as Kanon & Mirei (Prism Mates))	2013	—	—	—	—	Music Goes On
"Glory Days" (as Runa & Hina (Prism Mates))	2013	—	—	—	—	Music Goes On
"Posical World" (ポジカルワールド) (as Natsu & Yuka (Prism Mates))	2013	—	—	—	—	Music Goes On
"Chocolate Paradise" (チョコレートパラダイス) (as Momona (Prism Mates))	2014	—	—	—	—	Music Goes On
"Idol Kinryoku Lesson Go!" (アイドルキンリョク♥Lesson GO！) (as Laala with Prism Idol Kenkyūsei)	2015	82	—	—	—	Prizmmy The Best!
"—" denotes releases that did not chart or were not released in that region.

==== Prism Box singles ====
Title	Year	Peak chart positions			Sales	Album
Title	Year	JPN Oricon	JPN Hot	JPN Ani	Sales	Album
"RainBow × RainBow"	2013	—	—	—	—	Music Goes On
"Happy Star Restaurant" (ハッピースター☆レストラン)	2014	107	—	—	—	Music Goes On
"Kiraki-Runway" (キラキランウェイ☆)	2014	131	—	—	—	Music Goes On
"—" denotes releases that did not chart or were not released in that region.

=== Video albums ===
Title	Year	Details	Peak chart positions
Title	Year	Details	JPN
Prizmmy Performance!	2013	Released: 6 December 2013; Label: Avex Pictures; Formats: DVD	—
Prizmmy Performance! Music Clip	2014	Released: 17 January 2014; Label: Avex Pictures; Formats: DVD	—
"—" denotes releases that did not chart or were not released in that region.

=== DVDs ===
Title	Year	Details	Peak chart positions
Title	Year	Details	JPN
Dancer's Party! Prizmmy Dance Academy Step 1	2012	Released: 14 September 2012; Label: Avex Pictures; Formats: DVD	—
Dancer's Party! Prizmmy Dance Academy Step 2	2012	Released: 19 December 2012; Label: Avex Pictures; Formats: DVD	—
Dancer's Party! Prizmmy Dance Academy Step 3	2013	Released: 20 March 2013; Label: Avex Pictures; Formats: DVD	—
"—" denotes releases that did not chart or were not released in that region.

== Filmography ==
=== Television ===
Year	Title	Role	Notes
2011	Pretty Rhythm: Aurora Dream	Themselves	"Pretty Rhythm Studio" segments
2012	Pretty Rhythm: Dear My Future	Themselves	"Pretty Rhythm Studio" segments
2013	Pretty Rhythm: Rainbow Live	Themselves	"Pretty Rhythm Club" segments

== Tours ==
=== Headlining ===
- Prizmmy: Grow Up Live Hyper! (2014)
- Prism Box Live Tour Virtual × Real (2015)
- Prizmmy & Prism Mates Nen Wasure Live: Overclock Live (2016)
- Hello My Future! (2017)

=== Concert participation ===
- Pretty Rhythm in Christmas (2012)
- Pretty Rhythm Dream Festival (2013)
- A-Nation Island (2013)
- Pretty Rhythm Christmas: Prism Stage (2013)
- Tokyo Idol Festival 2014 (2014)
- Tokyo Idol Festival 2015 (2015)
- Nendoroid 10th Anniversary Live (2016)
