= Karin Takahashi (singer) =

Japanese actress (born 2000)

- 髙橋 果鈴
- Born: July 22, 2000 (age 26); Chiba Prefecture, Japan
- Occupations: Singer; actress
- Years active: 2011–present
- Height: 1.53 m (5 ft 0 in)
- Relatives: Mirei Takahashi (sister)
- Musical career
- Genre: J-pop
- Instruments: Vocals; piano
- Years active: 2012–present
- Label: Avex
- Website: Avex Profile

Karin Takahashi (髙橋果鈴, Takahashi Karin; born July 22, 2000) is a Japanese singer and actress. She debuted as a member of the girl group Prizmmy, where she also made television appearances in the live-action segments of the anime series Pretty Rhythm. Following the group's disbandment in 2017, she appeared in 2.5D musicals and other musical theatre productions. She has had notable roles including Sailor Saturn in Sailor Moon: Amour Eternal and Un Nouveau Voyage and Sayu Yagami in Death Note: The Musical.

== Early life ==
Born in Chiba Prefecture as the eldest of two children. Her little sister Mirei Takahashi was also a member of Prism Mates and their combined unit, Prism Box.

== Career ==
In 2010, Takahashi appeared as a member of the Roni Girls—a tween dance and modeling group—as a second- and third-generation member. During her time as a member, her dance stage name was 'CaN'.

=== 2011–2017: Pretty Rhythm series and Prizmmy ===
In 2011, Takahashi was featured in Pretty Rhythm: Aurora Dream, where she, Mia Kusakabe, and Reina Kubo (and later Ayami Sema) were portrayed as trainees. She also hosted Pretty Rhythm: Dear My Future and Pretty Rhythm: Rainbow Live in Pretty Rhythm Studio along with other members of Prizmmy and Prism Mates. As a member of Prizmmy and Prism Box, she has participated in singing anime theme songs, including those of its successor PriPara.

Takahashi has released a total of three albums and 12 singles with Prizmmy and three singles with Prism Box. She also participated in their mini-album LOVE TROOPER, which was released in February 2016. In their first album, TAKE OFF!!, she was given a solo song, "Tear Smile" which was later included in THE BEST album with all Prizmmy members singing

On December 8, 2016, via showroom, Prizmmy announced their disbandment in order to focus on their solo activities. The group officially disbanded in March 2017, where Takahashi continued in the entertainment industry as a theatrical actress.

=== 2015–2017: Sailor Moon and Death Note ===
In 2015, Takahashi was chosen for the Sailor Moon musical Un Nouveau Voyage, where she played the role of Sailor Saturn. In 2016, she again played Sailor Saturn in the Sailor Moon musical, Amour Eternal.

In April 2017, she, along with the rest of the Sailor Moon musical cast (except Chibiusa) attended Anime Matsuri in Houston as guests. After six years with Prizmmy, Karin realized her love for acting during her time in Sailor Moon and decided to pursue a career in musicals.

After her role as Sailor Saturn in the Sailor Moon Musicals, Takahashi began to receive more roles in other stages. Her next biggest role was as Sayu Yagami in the Death Note Musicals. Due to COVID19, she, along with the other Death Note casts over the years, gathered together to perform "Watashi no Hero, We all Need a Hero" (Special Ver.) and it was uploaded onto YouTube.

She participated in many musicals and stages based on anime such as Sailor Moon, Death Note, Actually I am and Children of the Whales.

=== 2018–present ===
In April 2020, Takahashi made her first TV drama appearance in popular Tokusatsu "Secret × Heroine Phantomirage!" in episode 54, as a table tennis player.

Takahashi opened her own personal YouTube channel on June 27, 2020.

On October 19, 2020, it was announced she would play the role of Sakura Yanagi in the spinoff of Revue Starlight THE LIVE - 2 Transition, Revue Starlight - The LIVE Seiran - BLUE GLITTER.

On August 16, 2021, Takahashi announced that she will be voice acting for the first time with RPG Game, Ragnador as Harionna.

== Personal life ==
On April 1, 2019, Takahashi announced via social media that she began attending university.

== Filmography ==
=== Video games ===
Year	Title	Role	Notes
2021	Ragnador	Harionna	

=== TV appearances ===
Year	Title	Role	Network	Notes
2011–12	Pretty Rhythm: Aurora Dream	Herself	TV Tokyo	Trainee days with Reina and Mia. Ayami soon came after.
2012–13	Pretty Rhythm: Dear My Future	Herself	TV Tokyo	The whole anime was based on Prizmmy☆ and their 'rival' group Puretty. They appeared in the end along with Prism Mates and Puretty.
2013–14	Pretty Rhythm: Rainbow Live	Herself	TV Tokyo	Only appearing in a couple of episodes for "Pretty Rhythm Club" where they would play games.
2020	Secret × Heroine Phantomirage!	Table tennis player	TV Tokyo	TV Drama debut Episode 54 & Episode 61 (Cameo)

=== Commercials ===
Year	Title	Role	Notes
2017	Premier Mobile	Granddaughter	Is cast alongside Sana Ishii former Prism Mates

=== Other ===
Year	Title	Role	Notes
2016~	NTT Docomo "Safety in the Classroom"	Mitsuki	Released on April 27, 2017

== Theatre ==
=== Musicals ===
Year	Title	Role	Notes
2015	Sailor Moon ~Un Nouveau Voyage~ (美少女戦士 セーラームーンミュージカル ~ Un Nouveau Voyage ~)	Sailor Saturn / Hotaru Tomoe / Mistress 9	Her debut stage as a musical actress. September 18–25, October 2–4, 2015
2016	Actually, I am... (実は私は)	Rin Kiryuin	The granddaughter of the main character Asahi. May 11–15, 2016
2016	Sailor Moon ~Amour Eternal~ (美少女戦士 セーラームーンミュージカル ~ Amour Eternal ~)	Sailor Saturn / Hotaru Tomoe	October 15, 2016
2017	PriPara Live Musical: Reach everyone! Prism☆Voice (ライブミュージカル プリパラ み～んなにとどけ！プリズム☆ボイス)	Herself / Dancer (Ensemble)	Cast along with Hina Miyazaki January 26–29, 2017
2017	Death Note: The Musical	Sayu Yagami	June 24–25 to September 2017
2018	Love and Youth (愛と青春キップ)	Mie Yoshizawa	October 25 to November 11, 2018
2019	A Miracle Every Thousand Years (千年に1度の奇跡)	Allium	Heroine November 7–10, 2019
2019	A Civil War Christmas	Jessa and Laba	December 22–28, 2019
2020	E Musical "Desert Island de Survival" (無人島deサバイバル)	Clover	April 20
2020	Girls Musical Revue Starlight - The LIVE Seiran - BLUE GLITTER (少女☆歌劇 レヴュースタァライト -The LIVE 青嵐- BLUE GLITTER)	Sakura Yanagi	December 21–27
2021	Musical Himeyuri	Ruri	Moon group March 26–29

=== Stages ===
Year	Title	Role	Notes
2016	Goodnight Jack the Ripper (おやすみジャックザリッパー)	Little Red Riding Hood	Only plays Little Red Riding Hood for the last show. Guest appearance along with Mia Kusakabe. April 24, 2016
2016	ShizuGeki "Stride" (シズ☆ゲキ ”ストライド”)	Yuri Nakajima	Cast along with Mia Kusakabe July 6–10, 2016
2018	Children of the Whales (クジラの子らは砂上に歌う)	Sami	January 25–28, February 2–4, 2018
2018	Gorilla ~GORILLA~ (ゴリラ 〜GORILLA〜)	Ibra	Main Role / Heroine 1st stage with Otona Pro April 18–22, 2018
2018	Come here Josephine! (こっちにおいで、ジョセフィーヌ)	Josephine	Lead Role (Team Pluie) 2nd Stage with Otona Pro May 23–27, 2018
2018	Brave Seiyan (勇者セイヤンの物語〜ノストラダム男の予言〜)	Grass 3	3rd Stage with Otona Pro July 25–29, 2018
2019	Magical Girl (?) Magical Ja Silica (魔法少女（？）マジカルジャシリカ -第壱磁マジカル大戦-)	Vatican Koromochi	Her character is from the Vatican. 4th Stage with Otona Pro March 13–17, 2019
2019	Back to the Your Smile ~Do you laugh at Robots?" (バック・トゥ・ザ・君の笑顔〜ロボットって笑うっけ？〜)	Brown	July 22–28, 2019
2019	Together with the Shower of that Day (あの日の通り雨に共に)	Riko Goto	August 21–25, 2019
2020	Valentine Blue	Kei Sasagawa	February 18–25
2020	Backstage! 3rd Stage	Audio Assistant; Miru Imao	July 29 – August 10
2020	Natsu no Hidamari	Mari	September 25–27
2021	Gekidol the STAGE	Kazuharu Yamamoto	March 3–7
2021	Galileo CV	Satomi Kudo	May 26–30
