= Pretty Rhythm: Aurora Dream =

2011 Japanese anime series

- Promotional visual

プリティーリズムオーロラドリーム (Puritī Rizumu: Ōrora Dorīmu)
- Genre: Magical girl, sports (Figure skating)
- Video game
- Developer: Syn Sophia
- Publisher: Takara Tomy
- Genre: Rhythm, dress-up
- Platform: Arcade
- Released: JP: April 28, 2011
- Manga
- Written by: Rio Fujimi
- Published by: Shogakukan
- Imprint: Ciao Comics
- Magazine: Ciao
- Original run: April 2011 – March 2012
- Volumes: 2
- Anime television series
- Directed by: Masakazu Hishida
- Written by: Deko Akao
- Music by: Seikō Nagaoka
- Studio: Tatsunoko Production
- Original network: TXN (TV Tokyo)
- English network: SEA: Animax Asia
- Original run: April 9, 2011 – March 31, 2012
- Episodes: 51
- See also
- Pretty Rhythm: Dear My Future (2012); Pretty Rhythm: All Star Selection (2014)

Pretty Rhythm: Aurora Dream (プリティーリズムオーロラドリーム, Puritī Rizumu: Ōrora Dorīmu) is a 2011 Japanese anime television series produced by Tatsunoko Production and Avex Pictures in cooperation with Takara Tomy and Syn Sophia, based on the arcade game of the same name. The series is part of the Pretty Rhythm franchise and the first animated series from the franchise, being an adaptation of Takara Tomy's 2010 arcade game Pretty Rhythm: Mini Skirt. It focuses on a group of Japanese idols known as Prism Stars who combine song and dance with fashion and figure skating and is a tie-in to the Aurora Dream edition of the game, introducing a new character Aira Harune, along with returning character Rizumu Amamiya.

During the series' run, each episode included a live-action segment titled "Pretty Rhythm Studio" hosted by Akina Minami and the Prism Mates, who debuted late into the series as Prizmmy. After the show's end, it was followed up by a sequel titled Pretty Rhythm: Dear My Future in 2012.

== Plot ==
The series takes place in Yokohama, Japan. Prism Shows, performances that are a combination of singing, dancing, fashion, and ice skating, are popular. The skaters, known as Prism Stars, use Prism Stones to coordinate their outfits and perform Prism Jumps to appeal to their fans.

Aira Harune and Rizumu Amamiya are suddenly scouted to be Prism Stars after Mion Takamine drops out of her debut showcase. Though Aira has no experience in performing, her fashion focus reveals her innate talent as a Prism Star. On the other hand, Rizumu is centered on perfecting "Aurora Rising", the legendary Prism Jump her mother once performed, in hopes that it may help her find her mother again. After Mion returns and bonds with them, the three girls debut as the Prism Star group MARs. The series explore their friendship and development into becoming professional Prism Stars.

After Rizumu's mother mysteriously reappears, Aira, Rizumu, and Mion enter the Prism Queen series to compete for the title of Prism Queen and perfect "Aurora Rising" to heal her. To do so, each girl must obtain a rare Prism Stone set containing wedding outfits from various tournaments, as performing "Aurora Rising" requires wearing a wedding outfit and devoting oneself to Prism Shows only.

== Characters ==
=== MARs ===
Aira Harune (春音 あいら, Harune Aira)
Voiced by: Kana Asumi
Aira is a fourteen-year-old second year middle school student scouted by Jun to be a Prism Star. She is clumsy and bad at sports, but optimistic and considerate of others. Aira's strongest suit is fashion and has the ability to hear the "voices" of clothing. She is a fan of Prism Stone, a store run by Sho from Callings, whom Aira also has a crush on.
In Dear My Future, Aira is a 18-year-old third year high school student. At the end of said series, she becomes a designer for Prism Stone.
As a Prism Star, Aira performs to the song "Dream Goes On." Aira's Prism Jumps are "Fresh Fruits Basket", "Heart-Pounding Experience", "Heartful Splash", "Lovely Rainbow", "Bloom-Bloom-Blooming Love Flowers", "Crystal Splash", "Miss Fairy Girl", "Valentine Sweets Parade", "Fresh Fruits Paradise", "Aurora Rising Dream", and "Fresh Fruits Planet". Her Prism Acts are "Happy Smile Girls" and "Road To Symphonia".
Rizumu Amamiya (天宮 りずむ, Amamiya Rizumu)
Voiced by: Kanae Itō (Mini Skirt), Sayuri Hara (Aurora Dream, Dear My Future)
Rizumu is 14 years old and a second-year middle student attending the same school as Aira. Despite having horrible grades, she is very good at dancing and attends a dance school for Prism Stars called Pretty Top. Rizumu is dedicated to performing and is the daughter of the legendary Prism Queen, Sonata Kanzaki, who disappeared after performing "Aurora Rising". Rizumu hopes to perform the same jump as the next Prism Queen, believing that it will bring her mother back. Rizumu is romantically interested in Hibiki, and as a result, she easily becomes jealous of any girl who seemingly displays an interest in him; the two marry in Dear My Future. Her catchphrase is "I'm full of energy!"
In Dear My Future, Rizumu is 18 years old and a third-year high school student.
As a Prism Star, Rizumu performs to the song "Kokoro no Juden". Rizumu's Prism Jumps are "Heartful Splash", "Colorful Choco Parade", "Fun-Fun Heart Dive", "Stardust Shower", "Happy Macaron Spin", "Pop'n Candy Rocket", "Stardust Shower Perfect", "Dolphin Venus", "Super Stardust Shower", "Heart-Pounding Experience", "Love Love Candy Rocket", "Dark Aurora Rising", "Dolphin Venus Perfect", "Aurora Rising", "Aurora Rising Final", and "Unlimited Love Shower." Her Prism Act is "Aurora Memorial".
Mion Takamine (高峰 みおん, Takamine Mion)
Voiced by: Azusa Kataoka
Mion is 14 years old and a popular idol and model. At an early age, she traveled the world with her parents, but she is currently living alone in Japan and feels lonely without them. Initially dismissive of Prism Shows, Mion becomes motivated to perform when she sees Aira and Rizumu perform in the Tiara Cup and eventually befriends them. Mion is in love with Jun. Her catchphrase is "Mion, switch on!"
As a Prism Star, Mion performs to the song "Switch On My Heart". Mion's Prism Jumps are "Do-Re-Mi-Fa Slider", "Golden Star Magic", "Stardust Shower", "Heartbeat Memory Leaves", "Honey Kiss", "Miracle Macchiato", "Shiny Diamond Dust Burning", "Eternal Big Bang", "Honey Kiss x2", and "Angel Kiss". Her Prism Act is "Shining Oasis Traveler".
Serena Jōnouchi (城之内 セレナ, Jōnouchi Serena)
Voiced by: Satomi Satō (Mini Skirt), Madoka Yonezawa (Aurora Dream)
Serena is one of the Prism Stars in the series. Her father, Steven, is a French businessman, and her mother, Karen, is Japanese, from Kyoto. She seems to be hot-headed and cannot stand being bored. Serena loves to dance and perform comedy skits with her best friend, Kanon Tōdō. She is also very competitive and strives to win over MARs.
Kanon Tōdō (藤堂 かのん, Tōdō Kanon)
Voiced by: Rika Komatsu (Mini Skirt), Satomi Akesaka (Aurora Dream)
Kanon is one of the Prism Stars in the series. She is usually elegant and reserved, but gets fired up to stop competition for Hibiki's affection. Kanon and Rizumu had a rivalry over him, while Rizumu was initially unaware that Kanon is actually his younger sister until Episode 24.
Kaname Chris (久里須 かなめ, Kaname Kurisu) /Kaname Amamiya (天宮 かなめ, Amamiya Kaname)
Voiced by: Kanae Itō
Kaname is one of the Prism Stars who joined Serena and Kanon in the Crystal High Heel Cup. In Episode 51, Kaname is seen living with Rizumu and her parents. She even shares a very similar personality to Rizumu's. Kaname came from a circus in Russia and likes to eat bananas. Near the end of Pretty Rhythm: Dear My Future, Kaname goes on a trip to find her biological parents.

=== Callings ===
Sho (ショウ)
Voiced by: Takashi Kondō
Sho is the leader of Callings, as well as the designer and manager of Prism Stone, Aira's favorite clothing store. Impressed by Aira's fashion sense, he falls in love with her and teases her occasionally but decides not to act on his feelings as long as he is in Callings. Sho gives Aira advice from time to time, but there are times where he is quick to lose his temper.
Hibiki (ヒビキ, Hibiki)
Voiced by: Kenn
Hibiki is a member of Callings who enjoys teasing Rizumu. His younger sister is Kanon.
Wataru (ワタル)
Voiced by: Nobuhiko Okamoto
Wataru is a member of Callings. Despite his youthful appearance, he is insightful about other people's feelings and attempts to get Mion to open up to people around her.

=== Pair Cheers ===
Rabbit-chi (ラビチ, Rabichi)
Voiced by: Risa Hayamizu
Rabbit-chi is Aira's partner that is a pink rabbit. He is good at Japanese comedy.
Bear-chi (ベアチ, Beachi)
Voiced by: Noriko Hidaka
Bear-chi is Rizumu's partner that is a brown bear.
Neko-chi (ネコチ, Nekochi)
Voiced by: Motoko Kumai
Neko-chi is Mion's partner that is a purple and grey cat. She was initially selfish like Mion, but opens up to the others.

=== Supporting characters ===
Jun Takigawa (滝川 純, Takigawa Jun)
Voiced by: Susumu Chiba
Jun is a 24-year-old associate at Pretty Top who can see "star aura", leading him to scout Aira and Rizumu. He believes that Aira, Rizumu, and Mion were destined to be together. Jun often gives advice in allegories despite Aira and Rizumu not understanding him. Later in the series, Jun is revealed to be Kyōko's adoptive brother, as her mother adopted him as her own son after his parents died in an accident. He proposes to her during Hibiki and Rizumu's wedding.
Kyōko Asechi (阿世知 今日子, Asechi Kyōko)
Voiced by: Risa Hayamizu
Kyoko is the 34-year-old president of Pretty Top set on making profits. She is a former Prism Star who once competed against Rizumu's mother, Sonata Kanzaki, and lost after being unable to perform "Aurora Rising". Her Prism Jump called "Platinum Spiral", inspired Sonata to become a Prism Star.
Yamao Yamada (山田 ヤマオ, Yamada Yamao)
Voiced by: Kenta Miyake
Yamao is the manager of Pretty Top's dance school. He carries Penguin-sensei on his shoulder, and the only thing he says is, "I am Yamada".
Mega-nee Akai (赤井 めが姉ぇ, Akai Mega-nee)
Voiced by: Kanae Itō
Mega-nee is the one in charge of the star coordinator where all Prism Stars go to get changed.
Penguin Teacher (ペンギン先生, Pengin-sensei)
Voiced by: Kenta Miyake
Penguin Teacher is a teacher at Pretty Top. He sits on top of Yamada's shoulders and is very awkward in Aira, Rizumu and Mion's eyes. In Pretty Rhythm: Rainbow Live, it is revealed that he was June's partner in the past, before the events of the series and before he left her and became the teacher at Pretty Top. In the final episode, he falls into the Mascot Hell as a punishment given him by Peacock.
Hiroshi Harune (春音 ヒロシ, Harune Hiroshi)
Voiced by: Nozomu Sasaki
Hiroshi is Aira's father who works at Haru no Soraoto patisserie. He is over-protective of Aira, especially when she is around boys or when she first started to do Prism Shows.
Omi Harune (春音 おみ, Harune Omi)
Voiced by: Noriko Hidaka
Aira's mother, Omi was the former Prism Star Stylist of Sonata Kanzaki and is good friends with the Amamiya family.
Uru Harune (春音 うる, Harune Uru) and Eru Harune (春音 える, Harune Eru)
Voiced by: Aki Nakajima (Uru), Hiro Nakajima (Eru)
Aira's five-year-old twin younger sisters. They helped Aira keep her secret from their father.
Itsuki Harune (春音 いつき, Harune itsuki)
Itsuki is Aira's ten-year-old younger brother who often teases her, but loves her very much.
Sonata Kanzaki (神崎 そなた, Kanzaki Sonata) /Sonata Amamiya (天宮 そなた, Kanzaki Sonata)
Voiced by: Kanae Itō (Young), Houko Kuwashima
Rizumu's mother Sonata is the Legendary Prism Queen who performed the Aurora Rising, twelve years before Aurora Dream premiered. She disappeared suddenly after saying she had not completed the Aurora Rising.
Ryūtarō Amamiya (天宮 龍太郎, Amamiya Ryūtarō)
Voiced by: Kenji Nomura
Ryūtarō is Rizumu's father and Sonata's husband.
Pietro Takamine (ピエトロ・高峰, Takamine Pietoro)
Voiced by: Toshihiko Seki
Mion's father and Anna Takamine's husband. He plays a small role in Pretty Rhythm: Aurora Dream, but helps Mion learn how to shine for her new Prism Jump by giving her some advice.
Kei (ケイ)
Voiced by: Yoko Soumi
Kei is revealed to be Sonata's coach when she was aiming to do the Aurora Rising. She later trained Rizumu. She is also Kyōko's mother, and Jun's adoptive mother. She divorced Kyōko's father because of his obsession with the Grateful Symphonia. She used to be a Prism Star herself.
Don Bomby/Kintarō Asechi (ドン・ボンビー/ 阿世知 欽太郎, Don Bonbī/Asechi Kintarō)
Voiced by: Takashi Kondō (Young), Shigeru Chiba
Don Bomby is the boss of the "Symphonia Company", the creator of the Symphonia Series, Romantic Night Wedding and the Pure White Wedding. He is obsessed with Grateful Symphonia and is willing to do anything for it. Kintaro is also known as the world's top designer. He is later revealed to be Kintaro Asechi, Kyōko's father and Kei's divorced husband.

== Media ==
=== Game ===
Beginning with the season 4, the original Pretty Rhythm: Mini Skirt arcade game was relaunched under the name Pretty Rhythm: Aurora Dream on April 28, 2011, to coincide with the tie-in anime adaptation, with Aira Harune added as a playable character. The game also featured a new system called a "Surprise Jump." Season 5, "Baton Pom Pom Edition", launched on July 21, 2011. Season 6, "Idol Debut Edition", launched on September 29, 2011. Season 7, "Pretty Remake Edition", launched on December 15, 2011, and added Mion Takamine as a playable character. Season 8, "Prism Queen Edition", launched on February 12, 2012.

=== Anime ===
Pretty Rhythm: Aurora Dream, an animated adaptation of the 2010 arcade game Pretty Rhythm: Mini Skirt, was announced in January 2011. While the original game focused on Rizumu as the main protagonist, the anime focuses on Aira, a new character added into the Aurora Dream edition of the game. The series was produced by Tatsunoko Production and aired on TV Tokyo between April 9, 2011, and March 31, 2012. The series was originally set to debut on April 2, 2011, but it was postponed by a week due to the 2011 Tohoku earthquake. The English dub aired on Animax Asia from January 31 to April 11, 2014. In addition to the television series, several two-minute shorts titled Prism Comedy Theater were released exclusively onto the DVD home releases.

A live-action variety show segment titled "Pretty Rhythm Studio" appeared in every episode. It was hosted by Akina Minami and was centered on the Prism Mates, three trainees from Avex Dance Master consisting of Mia Kusakabe, Reina Kubo, and Karin Takahashi, chronicling their training in dance, singing, and fashion sense to debut as idols, like the main characters in the show. Near the end of the series, the Prism Mates debuted in the group Prizmmy along with Ayami Sema, the winner of the Pretty Rhythm Award at the Kiratto Entertainment Challenge Contest 2011 Summer.

The opening theme songs are "You May Dream" by Lisp for episodes 1-29 and "1000% Kyun Kyun Sasete yo" by Pretty Rhythm All Stars for episodes 30–51. The ending theme songs are "Happy Go Lucky: Happy Lucky de Go" by Super Girls for episodes 1–12; "We Will Win! Kokoro no Baton de Po Pon no Pon" by Tokyo Girls' Style for episodes 13–26; "Pretty Rhythm de Go" by MARs (Kana Asumi, Sayuri Hara, and Azusa Kataoka as their respective characters) for episodes 27–39; and "Everybody's Gonna Be Happy" by Prizmmy for episodes 40–51.

=== Manga ===
A manga adaptation of the same name was written by Rio Fujimi and serialized in Ciao from 2011 to 2012. It was later compiled in two bound volumes by Shogakukan under the Ciao Comics imprint. It ran concurrently with Pretty Rhythm, the first manga adaptation based on Pretty Rhythm: Mini Skirt. The manga adaptation is centered on a middle school student named Flare Nanri, a fan of Prism Stone and an aspiring fashion designer.

No.	Japanese release date	Japanese ISBN
1	November 1, 2011	9784091340894
2	April 27, 2012	9784091344557

== Sequels ==
=== Pretty Rhythm: Dear My Future ===
A sequel set three years after Aurora Dream, titled Pretty Rhythm: Dear My Future, aired between April 7, 2012, and March 30, 2013. The anime was a tie-in series to promote the Dear My Future edition of the Pretty Rhythm arcade game. The English dub for Dear My Future premiered on Animax Asia April 14, 2014, for Southeast Asian distribution. Characters based on the girl group Prizmmy became the new main cast, while a new set of trainees from Avex Dance Master became part of Prism Mates featured in the "Pretty Rhythm Studio" live-action segments in every episode. The host of the "Pretty Rhythm Studio" segments is MC Kensaku.

In an attempt to market the franchise to South Korea, Puretty, temporarily named "DSP Girls", debuted through the show with characters based on the members appearing as the secondary cast, with the real-life members also appearing in the live-action segments. In the Korean dub of the series, the "Charming School at Prism Stone" (프리즘스톤과 함께하는 차밍스쿨) live-action segments aired instead of "Pretty Rhythm Studio", with the real-life members of Puretty starring in them.
