= Pretty Rhythm: Rainbow Live =

2013 Japanese anime series

- Promotional visual

プリティーリズムレインボーライブ (Puritī Rizumu Reinbō Raibu)
- Genre: Comedy, drama, sports (Figure skating)
- Video game

Pretty Rhythm: Rainbow Live; Pretty Rhythm: Rainbow Live Duo
- Developer: Syn Sophia
- Publisher: Takara Tomy Arts
- Genre: Rhythm, dress-up
- Platform: Arcade
- Released: JP: April 18, 2013
- Anime television series
- Directed by: Masakazu Hishida
- Written by: Deko Akao
- Music by: Seikō Nagaoka
- Studio: Tatsunoko Production; Dong Woo Animation
- Licensed by: SEA: Muse Communication
- Original network: TXN (TV Tokyo)
- English network: SEA: Animax Asia
- Original run: April 6, 2013 – March 29, 2014
- Episodes: 51
- Video game

Pretty Rhythm: Rainbow Live: Kira Kira My Design
- Developer: Syn Sophia
- Publisher: Takara Tomy
- Genre: Rhythm, dress-up
- Platform: Nintendo 3DS
- Released: JP: November 28, 2013
- See also
- Pretty Rhythm: All Star Selection (2014); King of Prism by Pretty Rhythm (2016); King of Prism: Pride the Hero (2017); King of Prism: Shiny Seven Stars (2019)

Pretty Rhythm: Rainbow Live (プリティーリズムレインボーライブ, Puritī Rizumu Reinbō Raibu) is a 2013 Japanese anime television series produced by Tatsunoko Production and Avex Pictures in cooperation with Takara Tomy Arts and Syn Sophia. The series is part of the Pretty Rhythm franchise and is its third animated series, focusing on a group of Japanese idols known as "Prism Stars" that combine song and dance with fashion and figure skating. The anime series was created as a tie-in to promote the arcade game of the same name.

Pretty Rhythm: Rainbow Live is directed by Masakazu Hishida, with character designs by Okama. The show features a story separate from its preceding seasons, Pretty Rhythm: Aurora Dream and Pretty Rhythm: Dear My Future. During the series' run, each episode ended with a live-action segment titled "Pretty Rhythm Club" hosted by the girl group Prizmmy, along with their sister trainee group Prism Mates.

After the series' run, it was succeeded by Pretty Rhythm: All Star Selection in 2014. A sequel spin-off focusing on the male characters, titled the King of Prism series, launched in theaters in 2016 beginning with the film King of Prism by Pretty Rhythm, followed by King of Prism: Pride the Hero in 2017 and King of Prism: Shiny Seven Stars in 2019.

== Plot ==
For her work experience assignment, middle school student Naru Ayase applies for a manager position at the clothing store Prism Stone in Harajuku. There, she is introduced to Prism Shows, idol-style concerts combining song, dance, fashion, and figure skating, with heart-shaped gems called Prism Stones to accessorize. With her Pair Friend, Lovelin, she is able to perform a new type of Prism Show called a "Prism Live", where she plays an instrument in the middle of a Prism Show. Joined by her classmates, Ann Fukuhara and Ito Suzuno, Naru is hired at Prism Stone and is also asked to take care of Rinne, an amnesiac girl. Rinne is capable of performing four Prism Jump combinations, a feat only accomplished by the current Prism Queen, June Amou, which draws attention from Bell Renjoji, Otoha Takanashi, and Wakana Morizono, top students from the elite Prism Star school Edel Rose.

Bell, Otoha, and Wakana challenge Prism Stone to enter their first competitive Prism Show tournament. As Prism Shows are scored based on the number of Prism Jump combinations, Prism Stone loses, but their ability to do Prism Lives interests Hijiri Himuro, the chairman of the Prism Show Association. As Hijiri believes it may revitalize the public's dying interest in Prism Shows, he has Prism Lives become integrated into the scoring system, and their popularity inspires June to perform in Prism Shows again. This, in turn, causes the supervisor of Edel Rose and current Prism King, Jin Norizuki, to use underhanded tactics in order to claim the title of Prism Queen for his school.

During the Winter White Session, Rinne remembers that she is a messenger from the Prism World tasked to spread the Prism Sparkle, which sustain the magic of the rinks, Pair Friends, Prism Stones, and Prism Jumps. Rinne was originally supposed to absorb June, the current Prism Messenger, but June has gone rogue from the Prism World and has been competing in Prism Shows to stay with Hijiri, therefore preventing humans from spreading the Prism Sparkle. Naru learns that in order to save the Prism Sparkle, they must claim the Prism Queen title from June during the Over the Rainbow Session and evolve their Seventh Coord. When the last of the Prism Sparkle vanishes, Naru brings it back with her determination, and Bell wins the Prism Queen Cup. After the girls send Rinne back to the Prism World, everyone moves on with their lives.

== Characters ==
=== Happy RAIN ===
Happy RAIN (ハッピーレイン♪, Happī Rein) is a Prism Star unit composed of Prism Stone employees Naru Ayase, Ann Fukuhara, and Ito Suzuno.

Naru Ayase (彩瀬 なる, Ayase Naru)
Voiced by: Emiri Katō
Naru is 14 years old and a natural girl who can see the "color" of the music. Naru becomes Prism Stone's shop manager for her school's work experience program, and her dream is to be a shop owner of a fashionable shop like Dear Crown. One of her specialties is decorating Prism Stones. Her catchphrase is "So happy!"
As a Prism Star, Naru is a lovely-style performer and uses the Prism Rainbow Guitar during Prism Lives, performing the song "Heart Iro Tori Dream." Near the end of the series, she returns the Prism's sparkle. Afterwards, she becomes a well-known Prism Star and begins working at Dear Crown as a model.

Ann Fukuhara (福原 あん, Fukuhara An)
Voiced by: Yū Serizawa
Ann is 14 years old and she can be able to taste the "color" of the music. Ann is the class representative of Naru and Ito's class and the president of the school's Prism Show Club, with a fascination for aliens. She enjoys sweets, but her father actively discourages her from making them to work in their family's senbei store instead. Ann is hired as the main pastry chef of Prism Stone's sweets corner. Later in the series, she realizes she is in love with her upperclassman, Kazuki. Her catchphrase is "Leave it to Ann!"
As a Prism Star, Ann is a pop-style performer and uses the Prism Rainbow Drums during Prism Lives, performing the song "Sweet Time Cooking Magic (Harapeko Nan Desu Watashi tte)."

Ito Suzuno (涼野 いと, Suzuno Ito)
Voiced by: Mikako Komatsu
Ito is 14 years old and is able to feel the "heat" of the music. She has a cool personality and prefers to be called by her nickname "Cross" (クロス, Kurosu). Her parents are divorced, but Ito keeps a purple Prism Stone in her pocket as a gift from her mother and learned the piano from her. Ito is in love with Koji and begins dating him in the middle of the series. Ito is hired as the make-up artist of Prism Stone, mostly because she hopes to purchase her father's old guitar from a pawn shop. Her catchphrase is "Intense!"
As a Prism Star, Ito is a cool-style performer and uses the Prism Rainbow Keyboard during Prism Lives, performing the song "BT37.5."

Rinne (りんね)
Voiced by: Ayane Sakura
Rinne is a mysterious amnesiac girl who is missing emotions and has the appearance of being 14 or 15 years old. She previously appeared on the Nintendo 3DS port of the original Pretty Rhythm arcade game, Pretty Rhythm: My Deco Rainbow Wedding. She draws the attention of her rivals for being able to perform four Prism Jump combinations. When she begins attending Naru's school, she registers under the name Rinne Ibara (荊 りんね, Ibara Rinne), with Chisato's surname.
Rinne is revealed to be one of the group-minded messengers from the Prism World. As a Prism Messenger, Rinne is tasked with spreading the Prism Sparkle across the world, but the rules of the Prism World state that she is not allowed to fall in love or perform in Prism Shows. When her mission is completed, she must return to the Prism World, a process that will also cause her to lose her memories, and be absorbed by a new Rinne-type messenger. After remembering her mission, Rinne realizes that June is the cause of her current memory loss, after she tries to prevent them from merging.
As a Prism Star, Rinne is a star-style performer and uses the Prism Rainbow Guitar during Prism Lives, performing the song "Gift".

=== Bell Rose ===
Bell Rose (ベルローズ, Beru Rōzu) is a Prism Star unit from Edel Rose composed of Bell Renjoji, Otoha Takanashi, and Wakana Morizono, middle school students from Le Celiana Girls Academy. Their group song is "Rosette Nebula".

Bell Renjoji (蓮城寺 べる, Renjōji Beru)
Voiced by: Haruka Tomatsu
Bell is 14 years old and one of the top Prism Stars at Edel Rose. She is able to feel the "love" of music. Bell sees herself as Naru's rival after she is rejected as Prism Stone's manager in favor of the former and also becomes curious about Rinne for being able to perform four Prism Jumps. Having been under pressure to perform perfectly in school and violin as a child, Bell sees her only escape in Prism Shows and her friendship with Otoha and Wakana.
As a Prism Star, Bell is a sexy-style performer and uses the Prism Rainbow Violin during Prism Lives, performing the song "Get Music!" By the end of the series, she wins the Over the Rainbow Session and becomes the new Prism Queen.

Otoha Takanashi (小鳥遊 おとは, Takanashi Otoha)
Voiced by: Saori Gotō
Otoha is 14 years old and a Prism Star from Edel Rose who is able to smell the "scent" of music. She enjoys brewing tea and fairytales. She cares for Bell deeply and acts as her personal assistant. Because of this, Otoha is observant about minor details to ensure that everything is perfectly ready. For a brief period of time, she works at Prism Stone after Bell forces her out of the group, but with Ito's encouragement, she learns to be more outgoing and honest about her feelings. Her catchphrase is "Like a fairytale!"
As a Prism Star, Otoha is a feminine-style performer and uses the Prism Rainbow Saxophone during Prism Lives, performing the song "Vanity Colon."
Wakana Morizono (森園 わかな, Morizono Wakana)
Voiced by: Maaya Uchida
Wakana is 14-years-old and a Prism Star from Edel Rose who is able to feel the "wind" of music. She tells fortunes with Prism Stones and she views Ann as her rival. Having grown up in a strict family, Wakana spent most of her childhood moving away due to her father's job and thus refuses to let herself become emotionally attached to others. When Kazuki teaches her not to be afraid of taking risks and Ann helps her learn how to trust her friends, she realizes how important Bell and Otoha's friendships are to her.
As a Prism Star, Wakana is an ethnic-style performer and uses the Prism Rainbow Xylophone during Prism Lives, performing the song "Blowin' in the Mind."

=== Over the Rainbow ===
Over the Rainbow is a Prism Star unit from Edel Rose consisting of "genius" Koji Mihama, "king" Hiro Hayami, and "charisma" Kazuki Nishina, who debut at the finale of Pretty Rhythm: Rainbow Live. The members are second-year high school students at Kakyoin Academy. Their group song is "Athletic Core" and "Nijiiro Crown." Their Trio Jump is "Over the Rainbow", "Unexpected Heartbeat First Kiss", and "Heartbeat Cycling."

Prior to the end of Rainbow Live, the boys were referred to as the Prism Boys. The characters later become the main focus of the films King of Prism by Pretty Rhythm and King of Prism: Pride the Hero.

Koji Mihama (神浜 コウジ, Mihama Kōji)
Voiced by: Tetsuya Kakihara
A genuine songwriter, Koji spends time playing the guitar on the roof of his apartment complex but refuses to be involved in Prism Shows. In the past, he was originally planned to debut with Hiro and wrote their debut song, "Pride." Jin plotted to have Hiro debut as a solo artist and write the lyrics for his song, displeased with Edel Rose which values fame more than friendship, Koji left Edel Rose. He becomes attracted to Ito through her music and Prism Shows, and they begin dating in the middle of the series.
As a Prism Star, Koji performs the song "Reboot."
Hiro Hayami (速水 ヒロ, Hayami Hiro)
Voiced by: Tomoaki Maeno
Hiro is a top Prism Star from Edel Rose. His relationship with Koji is shakeful since his solo debut, and he manipulates Naru and her friends in an attempt to urge him to return to Prism Shows. He works to support his poor mother, and when offered the chance to debut without Koji, Hiro accepted it, including claiming songwriting credits for the song "Pride", which he uses as his theme song. After admitting that Jin had forced him to claim songwriting credits from Koji, Hiro repairs his friendship with him and later reunites with his mother.
As a Prism Star, Hiro is a star-style performer, with the song "Pride."
Kazuki Nishina (仁科 カヅキ, Nishina Kazuki)
Voiced by: Toshiki Masuda
Kazuki is Ann's upperclassmen and former club mentor. He is seen as an older brother figure by other street-style people. Ann and Wakana are both in love with him, although he is oblivious about this. Kazuki is also Koji's friend since childhood. He sees Rei Kurokawa as his idol and specializes in street-style performances, which are yet to be accepted due to breaking rules established by academy-style performances.
As a Prism Star, Kazuki is a burning-style performer, with the song "Freedom."

=== Dear Crown ===
June Amou (天羽 ジュネ, Amō June)
Voiced by: Rumi Shishido
June is a Prism Star exclusively modeling for the shop Dear Crown, and Naru idolize her. She was the winner of the Prism Queen Cup four years ago and famous for being the first Prism Star who can do four Prism Jump combinations.
June is revealed to be a Rinne-type messenger from the Prism World. She had chosen Hijiri to spread the Prism Sparkle, but after falling in love with him, she disobeys the rules of the Prism World by performing in his place at Prism Shows due to his injury, thereby preventing other Prism Stars from spreading the Prism Sparkle. Realizing that her memories with Hijiri mean a lot to her, she defects from the Prism World by turning her Rainbow Feathers into Night Dream Feathers, even if this means that her body will eventually collapse. At the end of the series, the Prism Goddess allows her to remain in the human world with Hijiri at the cost of losing her ability to perform in Prism Shows and erasing her memories.
As a Prism Star, June is a star-style performer and uses the Prism Rainbow Baton during Prism Lives, performing with the song "Nth Color."

=== Other characters ===
Chisato Ibara (荊 千里, Ibara Chisato)
Voiced by: Chie Kōjiro
Chisato is the owner of Prism Stone and Rinne's guardian who loves to eat candies. Her human form is revealed to be a robotic disguise, and her real identity is Momo (もも), a Pair Friend from the Prism World partnered with DJ Coo.
DJ Coo (DJ・クー, DJ Kū)
Voiced by: Showtaro Morikubo
DJ Coo is the DJ of Prism Stone, who created Momo's robotical body and operates the Prism Trailer whenever Prism Stone goes on tour. His real identity is Rei Kurokawa (黒川 冷, Kurokawa Rei), a former street-style Prism Star who Jin had unfairly disqualified from the last Prism King Cup. Rei's Prism Jump is "EZ Do Burning." The character DJ Coo is an homage to DJ Koo from TRF.

Hijiri Himuro (氷室 聖, Himuro Hijiri)
Voiced by: Toshihiko Seki
Hijiri is the chairman of the Prism Show Association and, later on, the new supervisor at Edel Rose. He was a student at Edel Rose four years prior, where he met June and taught her about Prism Shows. Noting June resembled his deceased mother, he fell in love with her. He is a former Prism Star who had to end his career prematurely after his half-brother, Jin, permanently damaged his leg.
Jin Norizuki (法月 仁, Norizuki Jin)
Voiced by: Shinichiro Miki
Jin is the supervisor of Edel Rose and the current Prism King after winning the Prism King Cup. However, he was able to win by sabotaging his opponents and teaches the same philosophy to Edel Rose students. He resents June for leaving Edel Rose to be with Hijiri and uses Spartan techniques to discipline the students. Just before the "Over the Rainbow Session," a competition to determine the Prism Queen, the team trumped up a scandal about a love affair between Hijiri and June in order to get rid of Happy Rain and June Amou, who were getting in the way, and forced Hijiri to resign from his position as the chairman of "Prism Show Association. Moreover, he gave money to the executives of the Prism Show Association, and succeeded in excluding most of the teams from the competition, including Happy Rain, Beef, Chicken, or Fish, and others who did not belong to Edel Rose, from participating in the competition.However, scheming plot ends here. Hiro, angered by the fact that he has even started to mess with Belle, reveals the truth about Edelrose during a live performance, and Rei Kurokawa reveals the truth about Hijiri's retirement and gave money executive to the Prism Show Association, Knowing all of this, His father, Kou Norizuki is fired him as the supervisor of Edel Rose and banished from The Showbiz World of Prism Show.
King of Prism, Jin establishes the school Schwarz Rose, having amassed most of Edel Rose's assets and students after Kou's death.

=== Pair Friends ===
Lovelin (ラブリン, Raburin)
Voiced by: Enapou
Lovelin is a pink penguin paired with Naru who represents the "lovely" part of Peacock. She was introduced in Episode 1 and loves decorating as much as Naru does. Lovelyn can turn into Lovely Charm Stone, which holds the Lovely Dress Set of the Seventh Coord. While Naru is performing a Prism Live, Lovelin turns into the Prism Rainbow Guitar.
Poppun (ポップン, Poppun)
Voiced by: Sayuri Hara
Poppun is a blue penguin paired with Ann who represents the "pop" part of Peacock. He loves eating the sweets Ann makes. Poppun can turn into Pop Charm Stone, which holds the Pop Dress Set of the Seventh Coord. While Ann is performing a Prism Live, Poppun turns into the Prism Rainbow Drumsticks.
Coolun (クルン, Kurun)
Voiced by: Nozomi Yamamoto
Coolun is a purple penguin paired with Ito who represents the "cool" part of Peacock. She cries very easily and takes care of Ito, helping her confront her true emotions. Coolun can turn into Cool Charm Stone, which holds the Cool Dress Set of the Seventh Coord. While Ito is performing a Prism Live, Coolun turns into the Prism Rainbow Keyboard.
Sessni (セシニ, Seshini)
Voiced by: Nozomi Yamamoto
Sessni is a hot pink penguin paired with Bell who represents the "sexy" part of Peacock. Unlike the other Pair Friends, she decides not to hatch until Bell shows genuine kindness. Sessni can turn into Sexy Charm Stone, which holds the Sexy Dress Set of the Seventh Coord. While Bell is performing a Prism Live, Sessni turns into the Prism Rainbow Violin.
Femini (フェミニ, Femini)
Voiced by: Sayuri Hara
Femini is a yellow penguin paired with Otoha who represents the "feminine" part of Peacock. She first appears to Otoha after Otoha was able to stand up to Bell. Femini can turn into Feminine Charm Stone, which holds the Feminine Dress Set of the Seventh Coord. While Otoha is performing a Prism Live, Femini turns into the Prism Rainbow Saxophone.
Ethni (エスニ, Esuni)
Voiced by: Enapou
Ethni is a green penguin paired with Wakana who represents the "ethnic" part of Peacock. She first appears to Wakana after she stops focusing on not making mistakes. Ethni can turn into Ethnic Charm Stone, which holds the Ethnic Dress Set of the Seventh Coord. While Wakana is performing a Prism Live, Ethni turns into the Prism Rainbow Xylophone.
Mr. Peacock (ピコック先生, Pikokku-sensei)
Voiced by: Enapou
Peacock is a white penguin with a rainbow tail paired with Rinne. He is the combination of all seven other Pair Friends. He can turn into Star Charm Stone, which holds the Star Dress Set of the Seventh Coord. While Rinne is performing a Prism Live, Peacock turns into the Prism Rainbow Guitar.
Starn (スタン, Sutan)
Voiced by: Kanae Itō
Starn is a white penguin paired with June who represents the "star" part of Peacock. While June is performing a Prism Live, Starn turns into the Prism Rainbow Baton, and she can also transform into two Prism Rainbow Guitars during June and Rinne's duet. After Juné's Prism Show battle with Rinne, Starn ran away from Juné and became Rinne's Pair Friend.

== Media ==
=== Game ===
The original arcade game was released nationwide in Japan on April 18, 2013, beginning with session 1, titled "Prism Live Debut Edition." The game featured a new system called Prism Live, where players can enter a bonus round that allows them to score more points with Prism Jump combinations. The session 2 update, titled "All Rare! Kirameki Days Edition", was launched on July 11, and added Bell, Otoha, and Wakana as playable characters. The session 3 update, titled "Chara Stone! Heartbeat Edition", was launched on October 3 and added June as playable character. During the session 3 update, the game was renamed Pretty Rhythm: Rainbow Live Duo.

Pretty Rhythm: Rainbow Live (Kira-kira My Design) (プリティーリズム･レインボーライブ きらきらマイ☆デザイン, Puritī Rizumu: Reinbō Raibu (Kira-kira Mai Dezain); lit. 'Pretty Rhythm: Rainbow Live (Sparkling My Design)') was released for the Nintendo 3DS on November 28, 2013. The game features the main female cast as playable characters along with a new character, Cosmo Hojo, as well as the female cast from Pretty Rhythm: Aurora Dream and Dear My Future. The limited edition of the game came with an exclusive Prism Stone featuring the Miracle Fantasy Rainbow Dress, which was usable on Pretty Rhythm arcade machines. The January 2014 issues of Ciao and Ribon included QR codes with exclusive in-game costumes for the characters to promote the game. Cosmo also appeared in episode 34 to coincide with the game's release date. Famitsu's editorial team gave the game an average score of 7.8/10.

An expanded version of Kirakira My Design was released for the Nintendo 3DS on January 5, 2015, under the title PriPara & Pretty Rhythm: PriPara de Tsukaeru Oshare Item 1450!, adding Hiro and PriPara character Laala Manaka as playable characters.

=== Anime ===
Pretty Rhythm: Rainbow Live premiered on TV Tokyo's 10 AM slot April 6, 2013, as a tie-in to the arcade game and ended on March 29, 2014. The English dub of Rainbow Live premiered on Animax Asia on June 24, 2014. The characters were designed by illustrator Okama. The plot in this series is separate from the previous seasons, Pretty Rhythm: Aurora Dream and Pretty Rhythm: Dear My Future. In addition, the plot is a continuation of the 2013 Nintendo 3DS game Pretty Rhythm: My Deco Rainbow Wedding, which focused on Rinne's backstory.

Each episode ended with a live-action segment titled "Pretty Rhythm Club", which was hosted by Prizmmy, a girl group put together by Avex Pictures, and their sister trainee group, Prism Mates. Prism Mates made an animated cameo in episode 9.

As a collaboration with Avex Pictures to celebrate TRF's 20th anniversary, Prizmmy covered several of their songs as opening themes. The opening theme songs are "Boy Meets Girl for episodes 1-13; "EZ Do Dance" for episodes 14-26; "Crazy Gonna Crazy" for episodes 27-39; and "Butterfly Effect" for episodes 40-51; all songs were performed by Prizmmy. The ending theme songs are "RainBow × RainBow" by Prism Box for episodes 1-13; "Rainbow" by Iris for episodes 14-27; "I wannabee myself (Jibun Rashiku Itai)" by Emiri Katō, Yū Serizawa, and Mikako Komatsu for episodes 27-39; and "Happy Star Restaurant" by Prism Box for episodes 40-51.

=== Manga ===
A manga adaptation illustrated by Michiyo Kikuta was serialized in Pucchigumi.

=== Discography ===
==== Studio albums ====
List of albums, with selected chart positions, sales figures and certifications
Title	Year	Album details	Peak chart positions	Sales
Title	Year	Album details	JPN	Sales
Pretty Rhythm: Rainbow Live Prism Solo Collection by Naru & Ann & Ito & Rinne	2013	Released: June 26, 2013; Label: Avex Entertainment; Formats: CD, digital download	111	—N/a
Pretty Rhythm: Rainbow Live Prism Solo Collection by Bell & Otoha & Wakana	2013	Released: October 16, 2013; Label: Avex Entertainment; Formats: CD, digital download	41	—N/a
Pretty Rhythm: Rainbow Live Prism Solo Collection by Koji & Hiro & Kazuki	2013	Released: November 20, 2013; Label: Avex Entertainment; Formats: CD, digital download	38	—N/a
Pretty Rhythm: Rainbow Live Prism Unit Collection	2013	Released: December 18, 2013; Label: Avex Entertainment; Formats: CD, digital download	70	—N/a
Pretty Rhythm: Rainbow Live Prism Duet Collection	2014	Released: February 19, 2014; Label: Avex Entertainment; Formats: CD, digital download	30	—N/a
Pretty Rhythm: Rainbow Live Prism Music Collection	2014	Released: April 23, 2014; Label: Avex Entertainment; Formats: CD, digital download	12	—N/a
Pretty Rhythm: Rainbow Live Prism Boys Collection	2014	Released: September 3, 2014; Label: Avex Entertainment; Formats: CD, digital download	32	—N/a
"—" denotes releases that did not chart or were not released in that region.

=== Merchandise ===
To coincide with the series, a Prism Stone shop was opened in Harajuku. In Japan, McDonald's released six exclusive Prism Stones with purchase of a Happy Meal in collaboration with the franchise beginning May 17, 2013.

== Reception ==
Theron Martin from Anime News Network rated the first episode 2.5 out of 5, stating that the show's formulaic plot is supposed to be a "cute affair" that allows girls to "indulge in fantasies of magical clothes changes and spectacular ice dancing/singing performances." He complimented Naru for having a "likeably spunky edge" but found DJ Coo both amusing and annoying. Episode 39 scored an average household viewership of 1.9%.

== Sequels ==
=== King of Prism ===
King of Prism is a film series focusing on the male characters of Rainbow Live, targeting an older female demographic. The 2016 film King of Prism by Pretty Rhythm grossed ¥250 million in two months at the Japanese box office, where it eventually grossed ¥800 million ($7,353,421) by the end of its run. The 2017 film King of Prism: Pride the Hero grossed over ¥600 million ($5.35 million) at the Japanese box office. In 2019, King of Prism: Shiny Seven Stars was released as a 4-part film series from March 2 to May 4 and was also broadcast for the Spring 2019 anime season; the theatrical release of all four films had a consecutive box office gross of ¥320 million.
