= King of Prism =

Japanese media franchise

- Created by: Syn Sophia; Takara Tomy Arts
- Original work: Pretty Rhythm: Rainbow Live

Print publications
- Novel(s): Young of Prism: Boku, Umareta!
- Comics: See below

Films and television
- Film(s): King of Prism by Pretty Rhythm (2016); King of Prism: Pride the Hero (2017); King of Prism: Shiny Seven Stars (2019); King of Prism All Stars Prism Show ☆ Best Ten (2020); King of Prism: Dramatic Prism.1 (2024); King of Prism: Your Endless Call Minna Kirameke! Prism☆Tours (2025)
- Television series: King of Prism: Shiny Seven Stars

Theatrical presentations
- Musical(s): King of Prism: Over the Sunshine!

Games
- Video game(s): King of Prism: Prism Rush! Live

King of Prism is a Japanese media franchise produced by Avex Pictures and Tatsunoko Production. The series is a spin-off of the Pretty Rhythm multimedia series and focuses on the male characters introduced in Pretty Rhythm's third anime series, Pretty Rhythm: Rainbow Live, aiming for an older female demographic.

King of Prism debuted as a film series in 2016, with the first film, King of Prism by Pretty Rhythm releasing on January 9, 2016. It was then followed by King of Prism: Pride the Hero releasing on June 10, 2017, King of Prism: Shiny Seven Stars releasing on March 2, 2019, King of Prism All Stars: Prism Show ☆ Best Ten releasing on January 10, 2020, King of Prism: Dramatic Prism.1 releasing on August 16, 2024, and King of Prism: Your Endless Call Minna Kirameki! Prism☆Tours releasing on June 27, 2025.

== Plot ==
The Pretty Rhythm series focuses on Prism Stars, idols performing figure skating routines through song and dance with special moves known as Prism Jumps. The characters participate in Prism Shows, live performances that are scored based on how charmed the audience is. Currently, there are two styles of Prism Shows for male Prism Stars: academy-style, standardized performances to appeal to women; and street-style, performances that incorporate street dancing and is not officially recognized by the Prism Show Association.

Set 1.5 years after Pretty Rhythm: Rainbow Live, the story follows Shin Ichijo, a new student at Edel Rose Academy inspired by the group Over the Rainbow to train at becoming a Prism Star and participate in Prism Show Tournaments. However, Edel Rose's ex-supervisor Jin Norizuki has established a rival academy, Schwarz Rose, who becomes their main competitor.

== Characters ==
=== Edel Rose ===
Edel Rose (エーデルローズ, Ēderu Rōzu) is one of the top dance schools specializing in Prism Stars attached to the all-boys high school Kakyoin Academy and Le Celiana Girls Academy. It is run by Hijiri Himuro. Edel Rose's famous alumni includes Koji Mihama, Hiro Hayami, and Kazuki Nishina, who formed the group Over the Rainbow. The new students are collectively referred to as Edel Rose Freshmen (エーデルローズ新入生, Ēderu Rōzu Shinyūsei), but by the end of Shiny Seven Stars, they debut as Septentrion (セプテントリオン, Seputentorion).

Shin Ichijo (一条 シン, Ichijō Shin)
Voiced by: Junta Terashima, Sayuri Hara (young)
Shin is a 15-year-old aspiring Prism Star who idolizes Hiro Hayami. Unbeknownst to him, Rinne had sealed Shine, the male Prism Messenger, inside him, which also gave him the ability to perform in Prism Shows. As a Prism Star, he performs to "Over the Sunshine!" and has the ability to do a Prism Rush, which excites the audience and reminds them of when they first saw Prism Shows. Shin's Prism Jumps are "Over the Sunshine" (King of Prism by Pretty Rhythm), "Shining Splash" (jump 1), "Shin Infinite Hug" (jump 2), and "Rising Sunshine" (jump 3) (Pride the Hero).
Yukinojo Tachibana (太刀花 ユキノジョウ, Tachibana Yukinojō)
Voiced by: Sōma Saitō
Yukinojo is a second-year student with a feminine appearance. He comes from a well-known family of kabuki dancers and is the 7th generation Kunitachiya. As a Prism Star, Yukinojo performs to "Hyakka Ryoran" and his Prism Jumps are "Thousand Year Blossom Splash" (jump 1), "Evening Moon Crimson Love" (jump 2), "Kunitachiya Spiral" (jump 3), "Dream-like State Hellish Love" (jump 4), and "King of 100 Flowers, Renjishi Spinning Flame Dance" (jump 5).
Taiga Kougami (香賀美 タイガ, Kōgami Taiga)
Voiced by: Tasuku Hatanaka
Taiga is a street-style performer from the Aomori countryside who idolizes Kazuki. As a Prism Star, he performs to "Fly in the Sky", and his Prism Jumps are "Burning Splash", "White Fan Zero", "Rising Tiger Hurricane", "Midsummer Night's Nebuta Dream", and "Bouquets for Fortune Boys."
Kakeru Juuouin (十王院 カケル, Jūōin Kakeru)
Voiced by: Taku Yashiro
Kakeru is the heir of Juuouin Holdings and has access to his company's projects, such as the Prism System, despite that several employees are against him taking over the company in the future. His real name is Kazuo (一男), but he insists on being called Kakeru. As a Prism Star, he performs to "Orange Flamingo." He can perform a Cyalume Change, which changes his outfit to a neon rainbow version in the middle of a Prism Show. His Prism Jumps are "Kakerunomics Fund" and "One Night Heaven."
Leo Saionji (西園寺 レオ, Saionji Reo)
Voiced by: Takuma Nagatsuka
Leo idolizes Yukinojo and designs Edel Rose's performance costumes. He hopes to break out of his feminine image. As a Prism Star, he performs to "Twinkle Twinkle." He can perform a Prism Change, which changes his outfit in the middle of a Prism Show. His Prism Jumps are "Metamorphosis of Love and Mystery" and "Lion Heart Flower."
Minato Takahashi (鷹梁 ミナト, Takahashi Minato)
Voiced by: Masashi Igarashi
Minato is from a large family and cooks for Edel Rose students, often incorporating foods they don't like. As a Prism Star, he performs to "Sailing Away." His Prism Jumps are Minato's Chef's Choice a la Carte (jump 1) and Grand Homecoming Harbor (jump 2).
Yu Suzuno (涼野 ユウ, Suzuno Yū)
Voiced by: Minami Takayama (Pretty Rhythm: Rainbow Live), Hiro Nakashima (Pretty Rhythm: Rainbow Live, young), Yuma Uchida
Yu is Ito's younger brother who first appeared as a minor character in Pretty Rhythm: Rainbow Live. He enrolls as a student in Edel Rose to become a Prism Star and aspires to become a songwriter like Koji. He is a fan of Bell, but dislikes Hiro. He insists on being called by his nickname, Zeus. As a Prism Star, he performs to "Shiny Stellar." He can perform a Prism Live, which allows him to play instruments in the middle of a Prism Show. His Prism Jump is "I am Zeus."
Ryo Yamada (山田リョウ, Yamada Ryō)
Voiced by: Daisuke Namikawa
Ryo is Edel Rose's janitor and the freshmen's coach. He used to be a Prism Star until Jin tarnished his image by plotting and publicizing an underage sex and smoking scandal.
Sakyo Amamoto (天下左京, Amamoto Sakyō)
Voiced by: Masaya Fukunishi
Sakyo is a student from Edel Rose first appearing in the mobile game King of Prism: Prism Rush! Live in November 2018. He is Ukyo's twin brother.
Ukyo Amamoto (天下右京, Amamoto Ukyō)
Voiced by: Satoshi Inomata
Ukyo is a student from Edel Rose first appearing in the mobile game King of Prism: Prism Rush! Live in November 2018. He is Sakyo's twin brother.
Revontulet Nikkanen (レヴォントゥレット・ニッカネン, Revonturetto Nikkanen)
Voiced by: Naoya Miyase
Revontulet is a student from Edel Rose first appearing in the mobile game King of Prism: Prism Rush! Live. He is from Finland.

=== Schwarz Rose ===
Schwarz Rose (シュワルツローズ, Shuwarutsu Rōzu) is a school for Prism Stars led by Jin Norizuki, who uses Spartan training to discipline students and has a large influence on media.

Louis Kisaragi (如月 ルヰ, Kisaragi Rui)
Voiced by: Shouta Aoi
Louis is Schwarz Rose's star pupil and Jin's favorite student, who claims to have crossed a millennium to see Shin. He is later revealed to be version 3.01 of the Rinne-type messenger from the Prism World, who assumed the form of a boy after the Shine-type messenger went faulty. Having watched over Shin for a long time, he falls in love with him, but he remains loyal to Jin, as being in Schwarz Rose is the only way he can accomplish his mission. As a Prism Star, he performs to "Pride", "Lunatic Destiny", and "I Know Shangri-La." Louis' Prism Jumps are "Starlight Kiss", "Absolute Idol: I Love You", "100% Pure Pure Arrow", "Star Splash", "Bloom-Bloom-Blooming Love Flowers", "Whispering Lunamystic Heaven", "Aurora Rising", "Fluttering Rainbow Tail", "Infinite Hug Eternal", "Can't Stop Fall in Heaven," and "Dawn's Love Again."
Alexander Yamato (大和 アレクサンダー, Yamato Arekusandā)
Voiced by: Shunsuke Takeuchi
Alexander, sometimes called Alec (アレク) for short, specializes in street-style performances and views Kazuki as his rival. As a Prism Star, he performs to "EZ Do Dance." Alec's Prism Jumps are "666 Muscle Bomb", "Iron Six-Pack Core Wonder" and "Rolling Thunderstorm."
Joji Takadanobaba (高田馬場 ジョージ, Takadanobaba Jōji)
Voiced by: Tomokazu Sugita
Joji, whose real name is Noriyuki Motokawa (本川則之, Motokawa Noriyuki), is a student at Schwarz Rose and idolizes Jin. He was formerly the leader of the Prism Star unit The Shuffle before being assigned a solo performer. He was introduced in Pride the Hero and Tomokazu Sugita was specifically chosen to voice him due to him promoting King of Prism by Pretty Rhythm on his social media.
Ace Ikebukuro (池袋 エィス, Ikebukuro Eisu)
Voiced by: Takayuki Kobayashi
Ace is Joji's ghost singer whose voice was featured in Pride the Hero before being introduced in Shiny Seven Stars as a new character. Initially Joji's protégé, Ace was later promoted to being The Shuffle's leader, consisting of members Kokoro Gotanda (五反田 ココロ, Kokoro Gotanda; Voiced by: Wataru Komada), Mond Uguisudani (鶯谷 モンド, Uguisudani Mondo; Voiced by: Norihito Hase), Mitsuba Kanda (神田 ミツバ, Kanda Mitsuba; Voiced by: Takuhiro Eda), and Tsurugi Okachimachi (御徒町 ツルギ, Okachimachi Tsurugi; Voiced by: Kotaro Hashimoto ).

=== Prism World ===
Shine (シャイン, Shain)
Voiced by: Mitsuki Saiga
Shine is a male-type Prism Messenger from the Prism World who decides to join Prism Show tournaments under the belief that male Prism Stars are too selfish to spread the Prism Sparkle. Because performing in tournaments will prevent the Prism Sparkle from spreading, the Shine program is deemed defective and Rinne kills him under orders from the Prism World, sealing him inside Shin. As a Prism Star, he performs to the song "Platonic Sword" and is able to perform a Prism Axel, allowing him to perform seven Prism Jumps simultaneously.
Prism Gods
Voiced by: Kenta Miyake (God I), Susumu Chiba (God II), Risa Hayamizu (God III), Himika Akaneya (God IV), Chihiro Suzuki (God V), Takuma Terashima (God VI), Miyu Kubota (God VII)
The seven gods of the Prism World developed the Rinne/Shine program to lead Prism Stars. The gods consist of God I: M-m.G (Type M), God II: H.B. (Type M), God III: D.A. (Type F), God IV: C.S. (Type F), God V: N.P. (Type M), God VI: P.M. (Type M), and God VII: M.F. (Type F).

== Production ==
Hiroko Nishi and Takeshi Yoda had wanted to develop a late-night 13-episode television series that would focus on Over the Rainbow, the male characters of Pretty Rhythm: Rainbow Live, but their original plan was rejected. When it was reworked into a film, it was rejected again, and the staff were told that if they were able to provide evidence that the project would work out, then it would be approved. When the full version of Over the Rainbow's theme song, "Athletic Core", received positive feedback. a character song album centered on them was produced. In 2015, Over the Rainbow appeared in the movie Gekijō-ban PriPara: Minna Atsumare! Prism Tours if the audience chose to view route 4, which ended with a teaser for their comeback. The film was financially successful, with fans attending the cheer screenings multiple times with glowsticks. After executives at Avex Pictures assessed the popularity of cheer screenings, they then approved the King of Prism by Pretty Rhythm film project.

== Discography ==
=== Studio albums ===
List of albums, with selected chart positions, sales figures and certifications
Title	Year	Album details	Peak chart positions		Sales	Certifications
Title	Year	Album details	JPN Oricon	JPN Hot	Sales	Certifications
King of Prism by Pretty Rhythm Song & Soundtrack	2016	Released: April 27, 2016; Label: Avex Pictures; Formats: CD, digital download	5	7	JPN: 19,042	—N/a
King of Prism Music Ready Sparking!	2016	Released: August 31, 2016; Label: Avex Pictures; Formats: CD, digital download	2	3	JPN: 12,900	—N/a
King of Prism: Pride the Hero Song & Soundtrack	2017	Released: September 27, 2017; Label: Avex Pictures; Formats: CD, digital download	5	5	JPN: 12,273	—N/a
King of Prism: Over the Sunshine! Prism Song Album	2018	Released: March 23, 2018; Label: Avex Pictures; Formats: CD, digital download	48	81	JPN: 1680	—N/a
King of Prism: Prism Rush Song Collection: Red Night Vampire	2018	Released: June 6, 2018; Label: Avex Pictures; Formats: CD, digital download	21	25	JPN: 3,744	—N/a
King of Prism: Prism Rush Song Collection: Sweet Sweet Replies!	2018	Released: October 17, 2018; Label: Avex Pictures; Formats: CD, digital download	29	44	JPN: 2,521	—N/a
King of Prism: Prism Rush Song Collection: Star Masquerade	2019	Released: March 13, 2019; Label: Avex Pictures; Formats: CD, digital download	30	56	JPN: 2,345	—N/a
King of Prism: Shiny Seven Stars Song & Soundtrack	2019	Released: October 9, 2019; Label: Avex Pictures; Formats: CD, digital download	27	42	JPN: 2,003	—N/a
King of Prism: Shiny Rose Stars	2020	Released: June 26, 2020; Label: Avex Pictures; Formats: CD, digital download	TBA	TBA	TBA	TBA
"—" denotes releases that did not chart or were not released in that region.

=== Singles ===
List of singles, with selected chart positions, sales figures and certifications
Title	Year	Peak chart positions			Sales	Album
Title	Year	JPN	JPN Hot	JPN Ani.	Sales	Album
"Itai Dōshin Respect!" (異体同心RESPECT!)	2017	37	—	—	JPN: 2,278	Non-album single
"Vi Va Vacances!"	2017	33	—	—	JPN: 2,359	Non-album single
"Delicious Essence"	2017	43	—	—	JPN: 1,932	Non-album single
"Neo Street Stream"	2017	32	—	—	JPN: 2,435	Non-album single
"Summer Sky Monologue" (サマースカイ・モノローグ)	2017	34	—	—	JPN: 2,230	Non-album single
"Winter Eyes"	2018	30	—	—	JPN: 2,205	Non-album single
"Happy Happy Birthday!"	2018	30	—	—	JPN: 2,205	Non-album single
"Hyakka Ryōran" (百花繚乱)	2019	22	—	—	JPN: 2,648	Non-album single
"Samui Yoru Dakara..." (寒い夜だから…)	2019	22	—	—	JPN: 2,648	Non-album single
"Fly in the Sky"	2019	19	—	18	JPN: 3,089	Non-album single
"Masquerade"	2019	19	—	—	JPN: 3,089	Non-album single
"Orange Flamingo"	2019	21	—	19	JPN: 2,901	Non-album single
"Unite! The Night!"	2019	21	—	—	JPN: 2,901	Non-album single
"Joker Kiss!"	2019	27	—	—	JPN: 1,926	Non-album single
"Joy"	2019	27	—	—	JPN: 1,926	Non-album single
"Sailing!"	2019	26	—	—	JPN: 1,935	Non-album single
"Legend of Wind"	2019	26	—	—	JPN: 1,935	Non-album single
"Twinkle Twinkle"	2019	33	—	—	JPN: 1,972	Non-album single
"Love & Peace Forever"	2019	33	—	—	JPN: 1,972	Non-album single
"Shiny Stellar"	2019	30	—	—	JPN: 2,050	Non-album single
"Overnight Sensation (Jidai wa Anata ni Yudaneteru)" (Overnight Sensation ～時代はあなたに委ねてる～)	2019	30	—	—	JPN: 2,050	Non-album single
"Survival Dance (No No Cry More)"	2019	29	—	—	JPN: 2,070	Non-album single
"Silver and Gold Dance"	2019	29	—	—	JPN: 2,070	Non-album single
"I Know Shangri-La"	2019	32	—	—	JPN: 2,022	Non-album single
"Ai wa Mou Sukoshi Hoshii yo" (愛がもう少し欲しいよ)	2019	32	—	—	JPN: 2,022	Non-album single
"Platonic Sword" (プラトニックソード)	2019	25	—	—	JPN: 2,347	Non-album single
"Brand New Tomorrow"	2019	25	—	—	JPN: 2,347	Non-album single
"Nanairo Chikai! (Brilliant Oath)" (ナナイロノチカイ!-Brilliant oath-)	2019	24	—	—	JPN: 2,530	Non-album single
"Boy Meets Girl"	2019	24	—	—	JPN: 2,530	Non-album single
"Daisuki Refrain" (ダイスキリフレイン)	2020	34	—	—	JPN: 2,569	Non-album single
"Dramatic Love" (ドラマチックLOVE)	2020	34	—	—	JPN: 2,569	Non-album single
"Love Graffiti" (LOVEグラフィティ)	2020	21	TBA	TBA	TBA	Non-album single
"—" denotes releases that did not chart or were not released in that region.

=== As featured artist ===
Title	Year	Peak chart positions		Sales	Album
Title	Year	JPN Hot	JPN Ani	Sales	Album
"Hypnosis Mic (Street Rap Battle)" (ヒプノシスマイク -Street Rap Battle-)	2019	—	—	—	Non-album single
"—" denotes releases that did not chart or were not released in that region.

== Media ==
=== Films ===
After teasing Over the Rainbow's comeback at several Pretty Rhythm and PriPara events, King of Prism by Pretty Rhythm was announced at an Edel Rose event in 2015. The film was directed by Masakazu Hishida, who had previously directed various episodes of Pretty Rhythm, while Pretty Rhythm: Aurora Dream scriptwriter Jou Aoba was in charge of the script. Yoshihiro Otobe, who previously handled the CG direction in Pretty Rhythm Rainbow Live was in charge of the CG direction for the film, and Mai Matsuura was in charge of character designs. The film was released in Japan on January 9, 2016, grossing ¥250 million at the Japanese box office in two months. Though King of Prism by Pretty Rhythm was initially planned to screen in 14 theaters, the popularity and financial success led the film to screen in more than 130 theaters nationwide, later selling about 460,000 tickets for approximately ¥800 million. 4DX theater screenings were available in 26 theaters on June 18, 2016. The Los Angeles Film Festival screened the film on September 16, 2017.

A second film titled King of Prism: Pride the Hero was announced in 2016 and was released in theaters on June 10, 2017. The film ranked #7 nationwide on its opening weekend and grossed ¥100 million within the first four days of release, grossing more than ¥600 million.

King of Prism: Shiny Seven Stars, a television anime series and film project, was announced in 2018 as a sequel to the first two films. The theatrical version consisting of four feature compilation films, with three episodes condensed in each, were given limited cheer screenings from March to May 2019. The first film, King of Prism: Shiny Seven Stars I: Prologue × Yukinojo × Taiga, opened on March 2, 2019. The second film, King of Prism: Shiny Seven Stars II: Kakeru × Joji × Minato, opened on March 23, 2019. The third film, King of Prism: Shiny Seven Stars III: Leo × Yu × Alec, opened on April 13, 2019. The final film, King of Prism: Shiny Seven Stars IV: Louis × Shin × Unknown, opened on May 4, 2019. The theatrical release of all four films grossed a consecutive total of ¥320 million, with over 190,000 attendees. King of Prism: Shiny Seven Stars IV: Louis × Shin × Unknown, opened at #1 on opening day and #9 on opening weekend. The television version aired weekly on TV Tokyo at 1:35 AM beginning April 8, 2019, with all four films split into 12 episodes. Crunchyroll licensed the show for English distribution. The opening theme song is "Shiny Seven Stars!" The ending theme song for the theatrical version is "366 Love Diary", while the television version features cover versions of TRF's most popular songs from each character.

A fourth film titled King of Prism All Stars Prism Show ☆ Best Ten was announced in 2019 and was released in theatres on January 10, 2020. The anime film sold 26,000 tickets and earned ¥45 million in its first four days.

A fifth film titled King of Prism: Dramatic Prism.1 was released in theatres on August 16, 2024.

A sixth film titled King of Prism: Your Endless Call Minna Kirameke! Prism☆Tours was released in theatres on June 27, 2025.

A seventh film titled King of Prism -Tri-Star Act was released in theatres this fall

=== Stage play ===
A stage play adaptation summarizing both King of Prism by Pretty Rhythm and King of Prism: Pride the Hero, titled King of Prism: Over the Sunshine!, ran at Umeda Arts Theater Drama City in Osaka from November 2 to 5, 2017 and AiiA 2.5 Theater Tokyo from November 8 to 12, 2017. The play is directed by Masanari Ujikawa. Jou Aoba and Rei Ishizuka, who had worked on the original animated film as the scriptwriter and music composer respectively, returned to work on the play. The cast consists of Shohei Hashimoto as Shin, Koji Kominami as Kouji, Taishi Sugie as Hiro, Takuto Omi as Kazuki, Shojiro Yokoi as Yukinojo, Ryoki Nagae as Taiga, Yoshiki Murakami as Kakeru, Yuzuki Hoshimoto as Leo, Ryota Hirono as Yu, Taiki Naito as Louis, Spi as Alexander, and Yamato Furuya as Joji. Masashi Igarashi reprised his role as Minato from the film.

=== Manga ===
A manga adaptation of King of Prism by Pretty Rhythm, titled King of Prism by Pretty Rhythm Party Time, was drawn by Sumika Sumio and serialized in Monthly GFantasy. The manga ended in the February 2018 issue, released on January 18, 2018.

=== Game ===
A gacha game for smart phones titled King of Prism: Prism Rush! Live was released on August 4, 2017. The events in the game explore plot details in the King of Prism by Pretty Rhythm and King of Prism: Pride the Hero, as well as connecting them to King of Prism: Shiny Seven Stars with events titled "Road to Shiny Seven Stars." On August 12, 2020, Avex announced the game would end services on October 29, 2020.

=== Short stories ===
From January to December 2018, a series of short stories called Young of Prism: Boku, Umareta! by King of Prism were published monthly on Pash! Plus, the online website of the magazine Pash! Each story was released monthly, focusing on one of the main Prism Star characters when they were babies.

=== Other media ===
The characters of King of Prism have made crossover appearances in other franchises and games. Taiga, Kakeru, and Alexander appeared in a collaboration rap battle with Buster Bros!!! from Hypnosis Mic: Division Rap Battle. Shin, Hiro, Taiga, Kakeru, and Alexander appeared in Ensemble Stars! The characters will also be appearing in DREAM!ing. King of Prism has also collaborated with the skincare brand Bioré UV and appeared on promotional packaging.
