= List of Pretty Rhythm: Rainbow Live episodes =

- No. of episodes: 51

Release
- Original network: TV Tokyo
- Original release: April 6, 2013 – March 29, 2014

Season chronology
- ← Previous; Pretty Rhythm: Dear My Future Next → PriPara

Pretty Rhythm: Rainbow Live is a 2013 anime television series produced by Tatsunoko Production and Avex Pictures. It is the third animated series based on the Pretty Rhythm arcade game franchise by Takara Tomy. The anime aired in Japan on TV Tokyo from April 6, 2013, to March 29, 2014, replacing Pretty Rhythm: Dear My Future in its initial timeslot. The English dub aired on Animax Asia for Southeast Asian distribution in 2014. Each episode ended with a live-action segment titled "Pretty Rhythm Club", which was hosted by Prizmmy, a girl group put together by Avex Pictures, and their sister trainee group, Prism Mates.

After the series' run, it was succeeded by Pretty Rhythm: All Star Selection in 2014. A sequel spin-off series focusing on Koji, Hiro, and Kazuki, titled King of Prism, launched in theaters beginning with the film King of Prism by Pretty Rhythm upon positive feedback from releasing the full version of their theme song, "Athletic Core", and cheer screenings.

As a collaboration with Avex Pictures to celebrate TRF's 20th anniversary, Prizmmy covered several songs of its as opening themes. The opening theme songs are "Boy Meets Girl for episodes 1-13, "EZ Do Dance" for episodes 14-26, "Crazy Gonna Crazy" for episodes 27-39, and "Butterfly Effect" for episodes 40–51; all songs were performed by Prizmmy. The ending theme songs are "Rainbow × Rainbow" by Prism Box for episodes 1–13; "SS Rainbow" by iRis for episodes 14–27, "I Wanna be Myself!! Jibun Rashiku Itai!" (I wannabee myself!! ～自分らしくいたい！～; lit. 'I Wanna be Myself!! I Wanna be Like Myself!') by Emiri Katō, Yū Serizawa, and Mikako Komatsu for episodes 27–39; and "Happy Star Restaurant" by Prism Box for episodes 40–51.

Episode 39 scored an average household viewership of 1.9%.

== Episode list ==
No.	Title	Original release date
1	"I'm Naru! I'll Become the Shop Manager!"; Transliteration: "Watashi wa Naru! Tenchō ni Nāru!" (Japanese: 私はなる！店長にな～る！)	April 6, 2013
Naru Ayase applies for a manager position at the clothing store Prism Stone for her work experience assignment, as does Bell Renjoji from the elite Prism Star school, Edel Rose. However, Naru is unaware that the job interview includes a Prism Show examination. Without experience, Naru fails to remember the song's choreography, but after seeing its "colors", she performs successfully with a Prism Live, a Prism Show technique through her Pair Friend Lovelin. Rinne interrupts her exam by performing four Prism Jump combinations, leading Naru to be selected as Prism Stone's manager.
2	"Leave it to Ann! Pop'n Sweets!"; Transliteration: "An ni Omakase! Poppun Suīttsu!" (Japanese: あんにお任せ！ポップンスイーツ！)	April 13, 2013
Naru is tasked with curating Prism Stone's dessert menu and meets Ann Fukuhara at a cake buffet while researching. Ann, who loves sweets, is urged by her father to stop baking them and help run the family's senbei shop. She meets her Pair Friend, Poppun, who leads her to Prism Stone, where she helps Naru bake a cake. Although her father hates sweets, Ann accepts Naru's offer to work at Prism Stone's sweets corner. During the Prism Show examination, Ann performs two Prism Jumps and one Prism Live, resulting in her being hired.
3	"Cross is Ito? Cool & Hot"; Transliteration: "Kurosu ga Ito? Cool & Hot" (Japanese: クロスがいと？ COOL & HOT)	April 20, 2013
While Bell becomes suspicious of Rinne's ability to do four Prism Jumps, Naru is tasked with finding a make-up artist for Prism Stone. Upon seeing Ito Suzuno's make-up, she offers to hire her. Even after meeting her Pair Friend, Coolun, Ito refuses at first, but she reconsiders upon deciding she can use her earnings to buy her father's old guitar from the pawn shop. At her Prism Show examination, Ito performs a Prism Live with the help of Coolun, in addition to two Prism Jumps, after which she gets accepted as Prism Stone's makeup manager.
4	"Welcome to the Prism Stone Easter!"; Transliteration: "Purizumu Sutōn Īsutā ni Yōkoso!" (Japanese: プリズムストーン イースターにようこそ！)	April 27, 2013
As Dear Crown is hosting an Easter event, Naru and the others plan their own Easter event at Prism Stone on the same day to bring in more customers. On the day of the event, Naru performs a Prism Show but cannot do a Prism Jump. Rinne intervenes, and they perform a dual Prism Live. Rinne lands four Prism Jump combinations, shocking Bell and her companions, Wakana Morizono and Otoha Takanashi. With their first event a success, Prism Stone celebrates, with Ito finally letting Naru and Ann call her by her true name.
5	"My Song is a Multicolored Dream"; Transliteration: "Watashi no Uta wa Iro♡Tori Dorīmu" (Japanese: 私の歌は色♡トリドリーム)	May 4, 2013
Chisato decides to start hosting Prism Shows at Prism Stone, where Naru, Ann, and Ito will debut with their own songs. Naru asks Koji Mihama, a boy she hears singing on the rooftop daily, to write her a song, but he refuses. Upon learning that someone had stolen his song in the past, Naru apologizes and inspires him with a story conveying that his song made her happy. Koji agrees to write her a song on the condition that he remains anonymous. After making a choreography for the song, Naru debuts with "Heart Iro Tori Dream", performing a Prism Jump.
6	"The Cool Heart Beats with Heat!"; Transliteration: "Kūru na Hāto ga Bīto de Hīto!" (Japanese: クールなハートがビートでヒート！)	May 11, 2013
Prism Stone attends the cultural festival hosted by the all-boys school Kakyoin Academy. While searching for Rinne, Naru runs into Koji and the school's top Prism Star, Hiro Hayami. She accidentally reveals that Koji wrote her song, causing tension between the boys, while Ito criticizes Koji's songwriting skills. Irritated at Koji, Ito volunteers to do the Prism Show and debuts her song, "BT37.5", landing two Prism Jumps, causing him to fall in love with her. Afterwards, Rinne is found, having won the Miss Kakyoin Contest.
7	"Sweet Magic for a Sour Dad"; Transliteration: "Ganko Oyaji ni Suīto Majikku" (Japanese: がンコ親父にスイートマジック)	May 18, 2013
Naru invites all their parents for formal greetings at Prism Stone, which will coincide with Ann's song debut. Unbeknownst to her, Ann has kept her job a secret from her father. When he learns about it, she spends the night at Naru's house after a heated argument. With Rinne's help, Ann designs her costume based on the dress she wore at her first Prism Show. She performs "Sweet Time Cooking Magic: Harapeko Nan Desu Watashi tte" with two Prism Jumps, which her father secretly attends. Touched by her Prism Show, Ann's father agrees to let her continue working at Prism Stone.
8	"The Boys' Duel is a Dance Battle"; Transliteration: "Otoko no Shōbu wa Dansu Batoru" (Japanese: 男の勝負はダンスバトル)	May 25, 2013
Wakana accuses Ann of stealing her song, while Ann asserts that the song was given to her by her upperclassman, Kazuki Nishina. Koji, who had written the song, is asked to confirm directly to the Edel Rose students, but he refuses to be involved. When Prism Stone confronts them, Hiro reveals that Koji was originally supposed to debut with him and mocks him for dropping out. Angry, Kazuki challenges Hiro to a dance battle for the rights to the song, but he loses from hurting his ankle earlier. Through a change of heart, Koji arrives to corroborate Kazuki and Ann's stories, allowing Ann to remain as the song's main performer.
9	"A Prism Live is a Cloudy Storm"; Transliteration: "Purizumu Raibu wa Harenochi Arashi" (Japanese: プリズムライブははれのち嵐)	June 1, 2013
Bell invites Prism Stone to perform at Edel Rose's Rose Party, but when they arrive without Rinne, she threatens to cancel their Prism Show. Ito discovers through Otoha that their invitation was a ruse to check if Rinne's four Prism Jump combinations were real. When Ann confronts Bell's group, Wakana challenges her to a Prism Show duel, where the loser must quit Prism Shows forever. Rainfall interrupts their performance, but Rinne appears on the lake, performing "Gift" with four Prism Jumps. After confirming that Rinne's jumps were real, Ann and Wakana decide to continue their duel at the Dreaming Session, a Prism Show tournament taking place next month.
10	"An Enigmatic Creature Appears at Prism Stone!"; Transliteration: "Nazo no Seibutsu Purizumu Sutōn ni Arawaru!" (Japanese: 謎の生物 プリズムストーンに現る！)	June 8, 2013
Naru, Ann, and Ito catch Momo, a pink penguin that has been eating the sweets at Prism Stone and claims to be Chisato's Pair Friend. Meanwhile, Rinne's Prism Show from the Rose Party has gone viral on the Internet, and Chisato dismisses it as special effects to the press to hide her identity. Later, Naru, Ann, and Ito decide to register for the Dreaming Session just to give Ann a chance to battle Wakana, but Bell criticizes them for not taking Prism Shows seriously. Ann and Ito seek advice from Kazuki and Koji respectively, while Hiro convinces Naru to apply under orders from Bell and his personal vendetta against Koji.
11	"Go for the Dreaming Session!" (Japanese: Go for ドリーミングセッション！)	June 15, 2013
After Koji disagrees with her reasons for joining the Dreaming Session, Ito decides not to attend, but she changes her mind after her father convinces her that her friends need her. After drawing lots, Prism Stone is set to compete against the Edel Rose Team S for the first round. Ito arrives at the last minute and performs "BT37.5" with two Prism Jumps, earning 2680 karats. Otoha competes next with "Vanity Colon" and the Black Ribbon Pumps from Bell, performing two Prism Jumps. To Ito's surprise, Otoha wins with 5440 karats, due to Prism Lives being a new concept and having no scoring guidelines.
12	"Soar! Feathers of Courage"; Transliteration: "Habatake! Yūki no Fezā" (Japanese: はばたけ！勇気の羽)	June 22, 2013
Fueled by her rivalry with Ann, Wakana performs "Blowin' in the Mind", performing two Prism Jump combinations and stopping short of performing a third. Despite her skill level, an impulsive Ann decides to do three Prism Jump combinations to win. She performs "Sweet Time Cooking Magic: Harapeko Nan Desu Watashi tte" with two Prism Jump combinations. However, she fails to land her third Prism Jump, earning only 2440 karats. Wakana defeats her with 6230 karats. Ann blames herself for being too confident, while Wakana becomes frustrated for not taking risks.
13	"The Rainbow Bridge Between Our Hearts"; Transliteration: "Kokoro wo Tsunagu Niji no Kakehashi" (Japanese: 心をつなぐ虹のかけ橋)	June 29, 2013
Bell performs "Get Music!" with three Prism Jump combinations. Naru prepares to perform to "Heart Iro Tori Dream", but she falls under pressure and cries. Suspecting Hiro's motives for suggesting Naru join the Dreaming Session, Koji arrives at the venue and is accosted by him, revealing that it was to prove that his songwriting talent is wasted on Naru. With Rinne's help, Koji sings to Naru and helps her focus. Naru performs three Prism Jumps, evolves her Seventh Coord, and gains wings. Despite the response from audiences, Naru does not earn karats for going over the time limit, while Bell wins with 7330 karats. Edel Rose Team S wins the Dreaming Session, while Wakana tells Ann that she does not need to quit Prism Shows for losing their bet.
14	"Rinne's Secret"; Transliteration: "Rinne no Himitsu" (Japanese: りんねの秘密)	July 6, 2013
As Naru starts taking Prism Shows seriously, she recounts the events in the first 13 episodes while training with Ann and Ito. Hijiri Himuro, the chairman of the Prism Show Association, visits Prism Stone to discuss Prism Lives with Naru and Chisato, believing they are the key to maintaining the dying popularity of Prism Shows. When Hijiri asks about Rinne, realizing she can no longer keep her a secret, Chisato tells Naru, Ann, and Ito about Rinne's true identity as a messenger from the Prism World, as well as Momo being her true identity. Rinne is sent to stay at Naru's house until her memories return.
15	"Otoha's Märchen Tea Party"; Transliteration: "Otoha no Meruhen Tī Pātī" (Japanese: おとはのメルヘンティーパーティー)	July 13, 2013
Threatened by Otoha's growing popularity, Bell removes her from her group. Otoha begins working at Prism Stone and helps them plan for their next event, a forest tea party fairytale. Bell and Wakana attend the Prism Show, intimidating Otoha, but with Ito's encouragement, she performs "Vanity Colon" with two Prism Jumps. When Bell threatens to cut off their friendship for good, Otoha – remembering Ito telling her to stop apologizing – thanks her for her kindness, leading her Pair Friend, Femini, to her.
16	"Wakana's Happy Freedom! Meow"; Transliteration: "Wakana, Happī Furīdamu! Nya" (Japanese: わかな、はっぴーフリーダム！にや)	July 20, 2013
As Prism Lives are become popular, Prism Stone gets dance lessons from Kazuki. Kazuki, who is also working on the town's festival, invites them to attend. During the festival, Kazuki finds Wakana and helps her embrace freedom instead of focusing on avoiding mistakes. As punishment for losing a shooting game, he makes her perform a Prism Show, where she does three consecutive jumps to "Blowin' in My Mind" thanks to his advice. When Wakana returns home, she finds her Pair Friend, Ethni, and an old photo of herself, Kazuki, and Ann, revealing that she is the only one who remembers they attended the same elementary school.
17	"Bell Blooms, Noble and Strong"; Transliteration: "Kedakaku Tsuyoku Beru wa Saku" (Japanese: 気高く強くベるは咲く)	July 27, 2013
Bell is appointed as Edel Rose's representative to perform a special Prism Show at Dear Crown. Bell overworks herself while practicing, drawing concern from her friends, especially Wakana, who confides to Hiro that Bell has been under pressure by her mother to be perfect since she was little. Despite having a fever, Bell performs to "Get Music!" with three Prism Jumps. When she nearly collapses after the show, she rejects Otoha's help, causing her friends to criticize her and the egg of her Pair Friend to leave her.
18	"I'm Hiro! Absolute Idol: Love NG"; Transliteration: "Ore wa Hiro! Zettai Aidoru: Ai NG" (Japanese: 俺はヒロ！絶対アイドル☆愛・N・G)	August 3, 2013
Hijiri invites Prism Stone to take part in the Heartbeat Days Session, an unscored Prism Show exhibition. Meanwhile, Hiro demands one of Koji's songs for his debut showcase and threatens to commission Ito for a song if he refuses. When Koji fails to convince Ito that Hiro is exploiting her, he gives Hiro "Pride" much to her anger, as she had planned on using Hiro's payment to buy her father's old guitar. At Hiro's debut showcase, much to Naru and Ann's shock as well, he performs "Pride" and claims all songwriting credits.
19	"The String That Links Our Hearts"; Transliteration: "Kokoro wo Musubu Ito" (Japanese: 心を結ぶいと)	August 10, 2013
Ito becomes determined to work harder at Prism Shows as her father continues to lose interest in music, but this causes her to become unable to perform Prism Lives. Koji tells her that he stopped Hiro from taking her song because he had taken credit for "Pride" when they were about to debut together. Ito calls Hiro, who confirms that he had only used her to get to Koji. At home, Ito finds a letter from her mother, which encourages her to continue finding a way to reunite her family from divorce. At Prism Stone, Ito can perform Prism Lives again with three Prism Jumps and the song "BT37.5".
20	"Our Hearts Together at the Heartbeat Days Session!"; Transliteration: "Kokoro Kasanete Tokimeki Days Sesshon!" (Japanese: 心重ねてときめきDaysセッション！)	August 17, 2013
Hijiri has June spectate the Heartbeat Days Session, hoping to reinvigorate her interest in competing in tournaments again. Bell performs "Get Music!" with three Prism Jumps. Remembering that the exhibition was intended to excite the audience, Naru has the audience sing along to "Heart Iro Tori Dream", while she, Ann, and Ito perform Prism Lives. During her Prism Live, Naru's Seventh Coord evolves. Inspired by their Prism Show, Hijiri announces the Try Groovin' Session, where contestants will perform as trios and Prism Lives will be eligible for scoring.
21	"The Second Audition"; Transliteration: "Midome no Ōdishon" (Japanese: 2度目のオーディション)	August 24, 2013
As Prism Stone prepares for the Try Groovin' Session, Otoha is reluctant to admit that she wants to return to Edel Rose. When Bell holds auditions for a third member, Ito convinces Otoha to speak her mind and attend. Otoha performs "Vanity Colon" using Bell's Black Ribbon Pumps and performs a Prism Live for the first time, evolving her Seventh Coord and landing three Prism Jumps. She is accepted back into Edel Rose.
22	"A Promise and Special Sandwich"; Transliteration: "Yakusoku to Supesharu Sando" (Japanese: 約束とスペシャルサンド)	August 31, 2013
Koji is asked to write Prism Stone's song for the Try Groovin' Session, while Ann becomes in charge of the advice column of Prism Stone's website. When Ann responds to Wakana's question about keeping promises, Wakana sets up a meeting with her without going anyway. When Rinne silently promises kindergarten students that she would perform a Prism Show at their school, Ann takes responsibility and performs in her place, singing "Sweet Time Cooking Magic" and landing three Prism Jumps. When Wakana notices Ann is not angry for standing her up, she accuses her for breaking a promise they made in elementary school, giving her their childhood photo.
23	"The Prism Wind Carrying Our Memories"; Transliteration: "Omoide Hakobu Purizumu no Kaze" (Japanese: 思い出運ぶプリズムの風)	September 7, 2013
Wakana reveals that when she was in Grade 4 of elementary school, Ann had stolen her center position in their Prism Show. As Ann fails to show up for Prism Stone's event, Wakana and Kazuki find her in the rain looking for pieces of the photo that Wakana ripped up. Kazuki clears up their misunderstanding by revealing he had Ann replace Wakana on that day due to Wakana having a fever. Wakana accepts Ann's apology, and because Ann develops a fever, she takes over her performance using a Prism Live for the first time, evolving her Seventh Coord and landing three Prism Jumps. She realizes Bell and Otoha's friendship mean a lot to her and returns to them.
24	"The Lonely Queen"; Transliteration: "Hitoribotchi no Jo'ō" (Japanese: ひとりぼっちの女王)	September 14, 2013
Koji completes Prism Stone's song for the Try Groovin' Session, but Ito realizes he had only rearranged the song she wrote for Hiro. Meanwhile, Bell is under pressure to learn how to perform a Prism Live, especially after her mother arranges her to perform at a party at Dear Crown. During the party, Bell is ordered to put on a Prism Live at the request of a business partner and fails, with Wakana, Otoha, and Hiro unable to help. Her mother, humiliated, forces her to quit Prism Shows and transfer to France to study violin.
25	"Goodbye, Bell"; Transliteration: "Sayonara, Beru" (Japanese: さよなら、べる)	September 21, 2013
As the Try Groovin' Session begins, Ito feels uncomfortable with Koji's arrangement of her song. Meanwhile, Hiro discovers Bell is moving to France with her mother and encourages Wakana and Otoha to stop her. When Wakana and Otoha assure her they love her no matter what, she admits she wants to stay to perform with them and returns. Together, they rename their group Bell Rose and perform "Rosette Nebula". Having realized she is loved, Bell lands four Prism Jumps with her Pair Friend, Sessni, and performs a Prism Live.
26	"The Happy RAIN Calls the Rainbow"; Transliteration: "Niji wo Yobu Happī Rein" (Japanese: 虹を呼ぶハッピーレイン)	September 28, 2013
Prism Stone is performing after Bell Rose, but Ito refuses to perform to their song. While Koji unsuccessfully tries to clear up their misunderstanding, Bell deduces that Koji's rearrangement was a love confession to Ito. Despite Naru's own feelings for Koji, she encourages Ito to accept that they are in love with each other. Afterwards, Prism Stone changes their name to Happy RAIN and perform "Doshaburi Happy!" with a team Prism Jump. Happy RAIN wins with 16600 karats, while Bell Rose, who won second place, congratulate them.
27	"Peacock is Angry!"; Transliteration: "Pikokku-sensei, Okoru!" (Japanese: ピコック先生 怒る！)	October 5, 2013
Momo fails her work evaluation for failing to remember what the Seventh Coord is. She dreams of Peacock, who tells her that she must regain the Prism Sparkle and return Rinne to the Prism World as fast as possible. Wanting to do this, the Seven Glimmers must shine, and the gate to the Prism World will open. Meanwhile, Hiro meets with Jin Norizuki, the supervisor of Edel Rose, with mixed feelings about his career.
28	"Prism Talk with June!"; Transliteration: "June-sama to Issho ni Purizumu Tōku!" (Japanese: ジュネ様と一緒にプリズムトーク！)	October 12, 2013
Happy RAIN is set to perform at Dear Crown with an interview by the current Prism Queen, June Amou. Ito becomes upset when Koji turns down her invitation to watch Happy RAIN's Prism Show, but he arrives at the last minute, inspiring her to land her new Prism Jump. Meanwhile, Koji's mother Natsuko suspects he is in a relationship with Ito. During the interview, June announces that she will perform both a Prism Live and five Prism Jump combinations in her next Prism Show.
29	"I'm Bell! I'll Become the Manager"; Transliteration: "Watashi wa Beru! Tenchō ni Nāru" (Japanese: 私はべる！店長にな〜る♪)	October 19, 2013
Naru, Rinne, Ann, and Ito are going on a field trip to Hokkaido, leaving Bell Rose to take care of Prism Stone while they're gone. Bell takes charge as manager, but the customers are scared away by her strict customer service. After discovering Chisato's true identity and receiving advice from DJ Coo and Hiro, Bell runs the store her way and successfully performs a fashion-themed Prism Show alongside Wakana and Otoha. Naru is teased that she will soon get fired as Bell is doing a better job as manager.
30	"The Crossroad of Vows"; Transliteration: "Chikai no Kurosurōdo" (Japanese: 誓いのクロスロード)	October 26, 2013
During their field trip in Hokkaido, Ito visits her mother and Yu, her younger brother, with Naru, Rinne, and An. Ito learns that the reason for her parents' divorce was the death of a family friend through a car accident caused by Ito's father. Ito becomes convinced that her mother no longer loves her father, until Yu affirms her otherwise. DJ Coo brings the Prism Stone trailer to Happy RAIN, and they perform "Doshaburi Happy!" for Ito's family.
31	"Aim to Be a Hero! Freedom!!"; Transliteration: "Mezasu wa Yūsha! Furīdamu!!" (Japanese: 目指すは勇者!フリーダム!!)	November 2, 2013
Three bullies from Edel Rose have claimed Kazuki's dance spot as their own. Hiro, who remembers the hardships he endured to make his Prism Star debut, uses this opportunity to force Koji into writing his second single by challenging Kazuki to a dance battle re-match. Kazuki performs "Freedom", a song written for him by Koji, with three Prism Jumps. His Prism Show overwhelms Hiro to the point where he unequivocally accepts defeat. The students are expelled, letting Kazuki and his friends dance there freely again.
32	"June, Soaring in Love"; Transliteration: "Ai ni Habataku June" (Japanese: 愛に羽ばたくジュネ)	November 9, 2013
June reflects on meeting Hijiri for the first time and becoming a Prism Star in his place after he gets injured before the Prism King Cup's Fly Sky High Session. She decides to participate in the Heartbeat Session with Happy RAIN and Bell Rose. Before Happy RAIN performs, Koji's mother confirms Ito is related to her past. Meanwhile, during Bell Rose's Prism Show, Bell aims for five Prism Jumps to best June, but she falls during the fifth jump. Afterwards, June performs "Nth Color" with five Prism Jumps, moving everyone to tears.
33	"Triangle Date, Meow"; Transliteration: "Toraianguru Dēto, Nya" (Japanese: トライアングル デート にゃ♡)	November 16, 2013
Kazuki invites Ann and Wakana to watch a movie, making Wakana feel uneasy. At home, she learns that her father's job is transferring to Singapore and they will be moving soon. Kazuki suggests that her father might change his mind if he sees her Prism Show, to which Wakana invites her parents to see Bell Rose perform. Bell Rose performs to "Rosette Nebula" with Wakana landing a Prism Jump, but she discovers her father had missed her Prism Show due to work. A crushed Wakana turns to Kazuki for comfort, which Ann witnesses.
34	"Let's Join Hands If We're Happy"; Transliteration: "Hapi Naru nara Te wo Tsunagō" (Japanese: ハピなるならてをつなごう)	November 23, 2013
While Ann and Wakana are preoccupied with their own concerns, Naru is invited to perform in place of June at Dear Crown for a children's charity event. During the Prism Show, the dark lighting scares the children, and Naru calms them by telling them to hold each other's hands. She performs "Heart Iro Tori Dream" and is joined by Rinne, performing four Prism Jumps together. Everyone is amazed at the Prism Show, except for June, who becomes horrified when she receives a vision of Happy RAIN and Bell Rose sending her back to the Prism World. Excited by the outcome, Hijiri suggests that they hold a duo tournament, to which June decides to join.
35	"These Shuffle Duos Ain't Working!"; Transliteration: "Shaffuru Duo de Dame da Korya!" (Japanese: シャッフルデュオでダメだこりゃ！)	November 30, 2013
Hijiri announces the Winter White Session, a duo competition. Realizing that there will be an odd member out, Happy RAIN and Bell Rose decide to shuffle into three duos. Ann suspects Wakana is hiding a secret and seeks Kazuki for help, who confesses about her transfer. Despite already being arranged in compatible duos, Ann declares she and Wakana will be partners.
36	"The Two Get Along Awesome at the Sleepover?!"; Transliteration: "Otomarikai de Futari wa Mechauma!?" (Japanese: お泊り会でふたりはめちゃウマ！？)	December 7, 2013
To get to know each other better, the girls plan sleepovers. Ann learns from both Bell and Wakana that Wakana cannot ask to stay due to already inconveniencing her father once to stay with Bell. Ann decides that they should perform a final Prism Show together while they still can and invite Wakana's parents. With Koji and Momo's assistance, Ann and Wakana debut with "Cherry-picking Days", performing the Prism Jump "Magical Space Planet". Wakana's father remains indifferent, but Wakana's mother, having had enough, demands he move to Singapore by himself.
37	"The Sad Lucky Star"; Transliteration: "Kanashimi no Rakkī Sutā" (Japanese: 哀しみのラッキースター)	December 14, 2013
When Otoha spends the night at Ito's house, they learn that Koji's father had died in the car accident caused by Ito's father, and because of this, Ito and Koji's parents refuse to accept their relationship. Otoha stays supportive to Ito by writing the lyrics to Koji's song, "Alive", which they perform the next evening at Prism Stone. With Otoha's encouragement, they land the Prism Jump "Our Romantic Show". After the Prism Show, Ito breaks up with Koji, afraid of causing their families more pain.
38	"The Happy Bell on Christmas Eve"; Transliteration: "Seiya ni Happī Beru ga Naru" (Japanese: 聖夜にハッピーベルがなる)	December 21, 2013
After spending the night at Naru's home, Bell feels that her mother doesn't love her. During Naru's visit to her home, Bell gets into an argument with her mother over control of their Prism Show, but Naru assures her that she and her mother care for each other in their own way. At Prism Stone, Naru and Bell perform "Little Wing & Beautiful Pride" with the Prism Jump "Starlight Feather Memory" to acknowledge how similar they were in spite of their differences. Afterwards, Bell mends her relationship with her mother and meets with a distressed Hiro.
39	"Steamy! Legend of the Rainbow Kappa"; Transliteration: "Yukemuri! Niji-iro Kappa Densetsu" (Japanese: 湯けむり！虹色カッパ伝説)	December 28, 2013
Chisato is instructed to bring Happy RAIN and Bell Rose to the hot springs in order to find hints about the Seven Glimmers, but with Koji and Kazuki coming along, the trip becomes awkward. Hiro provokes Koji and Kazuki for not taking advantage of their talent as Prism Stars. Wakana tells Ann she plans on confessing to Kazuki after the Winter White Session. Koji failed to try to work out his relationship with Ito. Meanwhile, June has announced Rinne as her partner for the Winter White Session, as Rinne performs "Gift" with five Prism Jumps on television.
40	"Double Confession? I Love You, Senpai!"; Transliteration: "Daburu Kokuhaku? Suki desu, Senpai!" (Japanese: W告白？好きです先輩！)	January 11, 2014
Since June's announcement, Rinne has not returned to Naru's home and refuses to see her. As the Winter White Session begins, Wakana helps Ann realize that she is in love with Kazuki too, but when they see him with another woman, they decide to give up on him. Together, they perform "Cherry-picking Days" with four Prism Jumps, earning 15800 karats and placing in 1st. After discovering that the woman is Kazuki's cousin, Ann and Wakana bond over their frustration towards him.
41	"Bonds Connecting The Stars"; Transliteration: "Hoshi ga Tsunagu Kizuna" (Japanese: 星がつなぐ絆)	January 18, 2014
As Ito and Otoha prepare for their duo Prism Show, Ito's father shares with them and Koji about his friendship with Koji's father and the events leading up to his accident. Despite this, Koji persuades him to allow him to continue dating Ito, while Ito invites him to watch her duo Prism Show to show her teamwork with Koji and Otoha. Ito and Otoha perform "Alive" with four Prism Jumps, earning 14800 karats and second place.
42	"Naru's Pinch! Lovelin's Disappearance"; Transliteration: "Naru Pinchi! Kieta Raburin" (Japanese: なるピンチ消えたラブリン)	January 25, 2014
When Naru and Bell visit Rinne again before their duo Prism Show, Rinne tells Naru goodbye, causing Naru to believe Rinne hates her. The Prism Sparkle disappears from Naru's heart, and Lovelin vanishes. Meanwhile, Kazuki suspects that Hiro is provoking him and Koji on purpose because he needs help, while Hiro suggests to Naru that Rinne may be testing her. Naru and Bell become encouraged to do their best and perform "Little Wing & Beautiful Pride". Lovelin returns to Naru in the middle of the Prism Show and her Seventh Coord evolves. After performing five Prism Jumps, Naru and Bell earn 16800 karats, placing 1st.
43	"The Angel's Determination"; Transliteration: "Tenshi no Ketsui" (Japanese: 天使の決意)	February 1, 2014
Rinne and June perform "Seven Days Love, Seven Days Friend", but their duo Prism Show becomes a duel when each of them land five Prism Jumps separately. During their duo Prism Jump, "Shiny Star Fantasia", they confront each other, with June revealing that she is also a Rinne-type Prism Messenger. Rinne persuades June to return to the Prism World, warning her that her body will eventually fall apart and cause the Prism Sparkle to disappear. However, June insists on staying to be with Hijiri. Their duel ends in a draw, with neither girl absorbing the other, and they win the Winter White Session with 17800 karats. Rinne returns to Naru but collapses, while June finds her body decaying.
44	"You Are the Saviors of the Rainbow!"; Transliteration: "Niji no Kyūseisha wa Kimi ja!" (Japanese: 虹の救世主は君ジャ!)	February 8, 2014
Rinne uses her energy to combine the Pair Friends into Peacock, who informs Happy RAIN and Bell Rose that the Prism Sparkle is disappearing from the world, thus will abandon Prism Shows. Due to June participating in Prism Shows as a Prism Messenger, she is preventing people from spreading the Prism Sparkle. Wanting to restore it, the girls must claim the Prism Queen title from her and evolve their Seventh Coord by the full moon. Because there cannot be two Rinne in the same world, Rinne and June are also at risk merging with each other. Amidst this situation, Kazuki confronts Hiro, while Ito finds out she's moving Hokkaido. Meanwhile, in order to eliminate competition for Edel Rose, Jin uses his connections to ban Happy RAIN and June from competing in the Prism Queen Cup through bribery and scandal.
45	"The Rose Revolution"; Transliteration: "Bara no Kakumei" (Japanese: バラの革命)	February 15, 2014
After Hijiri is accused of showing favoritism to June, he resigns from the Prism Show Association and announces that their relationship is strictly professional. In order to save Bell and Edel Rose, Hiro sacrifices his career to expose Jin during his concert by revealing the lies his image was built on. When Jin accosts Hiro, DJ Coo (revealed to be Rei Kurokawa), and Chisato apprehend evidence for his misdeeds and Kou, Jin's father, fires him. Happy RAIN and June's eligibility to compete in the Prism Queen Cup is restored.
46	"Opening! Over the Rainbow Session"; Transliteration: "Kaimaku! Ōbā za Reinbō Sesshon" (Japanese: 開幕!オーバーザレインボーセッション)	February 22, 2014
As the Prism Queen Cup's Over the Rainbow Session begins, the girls feel nervous under the pressure of saving the Prism Sparkle. Otoha, the first performer, motivates the girls and musters up the determination to perform "Vanity Colon" with five Prism Jumps, evolving her Seventh Coord and earning 9670 karats. Ann's grandmother visits from the United States and reveals to her that her father loved sweets, encouraging her to decide on her own future. Ann performs "Sweet Time Cooking Magic" with five Prism Jumps, evolving her Seventh Coord and earning 10080 karats, placing 1st.
47	"Shining Lucky Star of Love"; Transliteration: "Ai ni Kagayaku Rakkī Sutā" (Japanese: 愛に輝く幸せの星)	March 1, 2014
Ito's family appear at the venue to support her, and Ito's father confesses that he plans on selling their concert venue, Lucky Star. Koji's mother approaches them to apologize, revealing that Koji's father had also wanted to reunite Lucky Star and absolving Ito's father from the blame. Realizing her mistakes, Koji's mother finally accepts Ito and Koji's relationship. Ito performs "BT37.5" with six Prism Jumps, evolving her Seventh Coord and taking first place with 11400 karats.
48	"Like Me, Like A Human"; Transliteration: "Watashi Rashiku, Ningen Rashiku" (Japanese: 私らしく、人間らしく)	March 8, 2014
Wakana's parents come to watch her Prism Show, both having mellowed out after realizing the roles they played put a strain on their family dynamics. They apologize to Wakana for constantly making her feel she has to perform perfectly, helping her feel relaxed. Wakana performs "Blowin' in my Mind" and evolves her Seventh Coord. She lands six Prism Jumps and attempts a seventh one, but she falls and earns 6230 karats. With advice from Hiro, Bell focuses on her dream and performs "Get Music!", evolving her Seventh Coord and landing seven Prism Jumps. She earns 13140 karats, breaking June's record and placing in 1st.
49	"Until This Life Burns Out"; Transliteration: "Inochi Moetsukiru Made..." (Japanese: 命燃え尽きるまで。。。)	March 15, 2014
While June performs "Nth Color" at the Prism Queen Cup, she reflects on her feelings for Hijiri, revealing that, in order to keep her memories of him, she had destroyed Rinne's wings when it was time for her to take her place. In present time, June attempts seven Prism Jumps, but her body finally wears out during her last jump and she collapses, earning only 7650 karats. Hijiri admits to June that he loves her, giving June closure to her life and letting Rinne merge with her. The Pair Friends and the remaining Prism Sparkle vanish.
50	"The Sparkle is Right Next To You"; Transliteration: "Kirameki wa Anata no Soba ni" (Japanese: 煌めきはあなたのそばに)	March 22, 2014
With the Prism Sparkle gone, no one can to perform Prism Shows anymore. Despite this, Naru performs "Heart Irodori Dream" and she can restore the Prism Sparkle. She scores 2540 karats for falling multiple times, making Bell the new Prism Queen. Afterwards, with June's assistance, the girls open the Rainbow Gate to send Rinne back to the Prism World.
51	"Gift"; Transliteration: "Gifuto" (Japanese: ギフト)	March 29, 2014
Everyone reminsices the past year as they move on with their lives. Hiro, Koji, and Kazuki debut as the Prism Star unit Over the Rainbow. Edel Rose accepts new freshmen, with Bell and Hiro leading them. Naru, Ann and Ito perform for the last time at Prism Stone as they graduate. In the Prism World, a newly-reborn Rinne prepares for a new mission. Despite losing memories of the past year, she recalls things Naru taught her in a vague manner.
