= King of Prism: Pride the Hero =

- Theatrical release poster
- Directed by: Masakazu Hishida
- Written by: Jou Aoba
- Starring: Tetsuya Kakihara; Tomoaki Maeno; Toshiki Masuda; Junta Terashima; Soma Saito; Tasuku Hatanaka; Taku Yashiro; Takuma Nagatsuka; Masashi Igarashi; Yuma Uchida; Shouta Aoi; Shunsuke Takeuchi
- Music by: Rei Ishizuka
- Production company: Tatsunoko Production
- Distributed by: Avex Pictures
- Release date: June 10, 2017
- Running time: 70 minutes
- Country: Japan
- Language: Japanese
- Box office: ¥600 million

King of Prism: Pride the Hero is a 2017 Japanese animated film produced by Tatsunoko Production and Avex Pictures based on Takara Tomy's Pretty Rhythm franchise. The story focuses on side characters from the animated television series Pretty Rhythm: Rainbow Live, which aired from 2013 to 2014, and is a direct sequel to the 2016 film King of Prism by Pretty Rhythm. A sequel titled King of Prism: Shiny Seven Stars was released in 2019.

== Plot ==
Schwarz Rose has seized copyrights to "Pride" and registered it as Louis Kisaragi's song for the Prism King Cup, rendering Hiro Hayami unable to use it unless Edel Rose pays ¥10 billion. Kazuki Nishina appoints Taiga Kougami as his successor while he trains with Rei Kurokawa. Edel Rose later discovers that Koji Mihama is composing music for Schwarz Rose's newest talent, Joji Takadanobaba. Hiro goes to the United States to confront him, while Kazuki trains under Rei's guidance. Edel Rose's janitor Ryo Yamada, a former Prism Star whose career was crushed by Jin through scandal, trains the rest of the Edel Rose students for the Prism King Cup.

At night, Louis invites Shin Ichijo out and asks him to open the locket he gave him, revealing a photo of Shine. While performing a Prism Show together, Louis' "Whispering Lunamystic Heaven" Prism Jump ends with him confessing his feelings and kissing Shin before stabbing him. Shin awakens at Edel Rose, believing it to be a dream. Meanwhile, Hiro is forced to move on without Koji's help. Jin accosts Hijiri Himuro and beckons June Amou to follow him, determined to steal everything from him. Within the next week, Edel Rose becomes embroiled in scandal. Despite these hardships, Hijiri reveals to Hiro that Jin had grown so jealous of Hijiri's career as a Prism Star that he permanently injured his leg, ending with him promising to help Hiro. Later, Hiro's mother and the other Edel Rose students show their support, with Yu and Ito giving him another one of Koji's songs to use. Hijiri later announces that he will be registering Taiga, Yukinojo Tachibana, and Hiro for the Prism King Cup, but Yukinojo withdraws and asks to be replaced with Shin, despite Shin having lost his ability to perform Prism Jumps.

The Prism King Cup begins its Thunder Storm Session, and points are gathered through the Prism System with watches developed by Juuouin Holdings that analyze the emotions of the audience. Joji earns 14450 karats and puts Schwarz Rose in the lead, partially due to Jin bribing the judges and planting Schwarz Rose affiliates in the audience. Alexander destroys the stadium out of scorn for academy-style Prism Shows and challenges Kazuki to another duel. Taiga intervenes, leading both to be disqualified. Kazuki performs "Freedom" and restores the stadium and the audience's excitement, but he is also disqualified. While Shin performs "Over the Sunshine!", Louis tears off his earring and gives him the ability to do Prism Jumps again. Shin's performance is well received, but only earns 14380 karats, placing him in 2nd. Instead of performing "Pride", Louis performs "Lunatic Destiny." His "Infinite Hug Eternal" Prism Jump returns June's memories from Pretty Rhythm: Rainbow Live, including one revealing that Louis is also a Rinne-type Prism Messenger, while Shin was Shine, Rinne's lover, before she was forced to kill him. Having been the first to successfully perform four consecutive Prism Jumps at the Prism King Cup, Louis earns 20000 karats and is placed in 1st.

Instead of using the song Yu and Ito gave him, Hiro performs "Pride" and amazes the audience, even causing the Prism Goddess to crown him as king. Hiro earns 20000 karats and is tied with Louis, but before the final results are announced, Sanada destroys the monitor. However, Kakeru Juuouin reveals that Juuouin Holdings has partnered with the Itsutomo Group to improve the Prism System's security and have backed up the points, while Louis allows Hiro to take the win. With Edel Rose victorious, Koji tells Kazuki and Hiro that his contract in Hollywood is over, and Over the Rainbow can reunite again. Having received her memories back, June returns to Hijiri, while Louis vows to stay with Jin despite his feelings for Shin.

The credits reveal that Edel Rose is able to recover from scandal, while their students carry out their lives. In a post-credits scene, Over the Rainbow performs "Nijiiro Crown" as they graduate from Edel Rose and Kakyoin Academy.

== Cast ==
- Tetsuya Kakihara - Koji Mihama
- Tomoaki Maeno - Hiro Hayami
- Toshiki Masuda - Kazuki Nishina
- Junta Terashima - Shin Ichijo
- Soma Saito - Yukinojo Tachibana
- Tasuku Hatanaka - Taiga Kougami
- Taku Yashiro - Kakeru Juuouin
- Takuma Nagatsuka - Leo Saionji
- Masashi Igarashi - Minato Takahashi
- Yuma Uchida - Yu Suzuno
- Shouta Aoi - Louis Kisaragi
- Shunsuke Takeuchi - Alexander Yamato
- Tomokazu Sugita - Joji Takadanobaba
  - Takayuki Kobayashi - Joji Takadanobaba (singing voice)
- Toshihiko Seki - Hijiri Himuro
- Daisuke Namikawa - Ryo Yamada
- Showtaro Morikubo - Rei Kurokawa
- Shinichiro Miki - Jin Norizuki
- Ayane Sakura - Rinne
- Emiri Kato - Naru Ayase
- Yu Serizawa - Ann Fukuhara
- Mikako Komatsu - Ito Suzuno
- Haruka Tomatsu - Bell Renjoji
- Saori Goto - Otoha Takanashi
- Maaya Uchida - Wakana Morizono
- Rumi Shishido - June Amou
- Mitsuki Saiga - Shine

== Production ==
King of Prism: Pride the Hero was announced in 2016 for a June 2017 release. The story's main conflict was originally shown through a post-credits scene after King of Prism by Pretty Rhythm, which served as a preview on what the staff had planned to do with the plot as they were uncertain about the first film's financial success. A sequel was not originally planned, but after the overwhelming success of the first film, Avex Pictures greenlit the sequel.

For Pride the Hero, Mazakazu Hishida focused on battle elements that would entertain the male viewers, most notably Alexander and Taiga's Prism Show battle. Taiga's Prism Jump, where he would summon a fan to blow away Alexander's attack, was specifically created for the audience to mimic during cheer screenings. Louis' "Lunatic Destiny" routine used motion capture from a pole dancer, a first for the CGI team, as they had to hire a pole dancer and equipment. The staff spent two months deciding how Louis' clothing was going to move during the routine.

Shortly after King of Prism: Pride of Hero's announcement, Emiri Kato and Ayane Sakura were reported to have reprised their roles as Naru and Rinne from Pretty Rhythm: Rainbow Live. The character Joji Takadanobaba was created specifically for Tomokazu Sugita, who had promoted King of Prism by Pretty Rhythm extensively on social media and the shows that he appeared in.

King of Prism: Pride the Hero was released in theaters on June 10, 2017. The film was also screened at the Los Angeles Film Festival between September 21–23, 2018.

== Reception ==
King of Prism: Pride the Hero ranked #7 nationwide on its opening weekend and grossed ¥100 million within the first four days of release, eventually earning more than ¥300 million at box office. By October 2017, the film had sold more than 340,000 tickets, grossing more than ¥600 million.

== Sequel ==
King of Prism: Shiny Seven Stars was announced in 2018 as both a theatrical film and television series project. The theatrical version, consisting of four feature compilation films with three episodes condensed in each, was given limited cheer screenings from March to May 2019. The television version aired on TV Tokyo beginning April 8, 2019.

== Soundtrack ==
King of Prism: Pride the Hero Song & Soundtrack

Soundtrack album by Various artists
- Released: September 27, 2017
- Label: Avex Pictures
- Producer: Rei Ishizuka

The original soundtrack was produced by Rei Ishizuka, and it was released on September 27, 2017, under the name King of Prism: Pride the Hero Song & Soundtrack (劇場版KING OF PRISM -PRIDE the HERO- Song&Soundtrack). The album peaked at #5 on the Oricon Weekly Albums Chart and charted for four weeks.

Disc 1
No.	Title	Lyrics	Music	Arrangement	Length
1.	"Vivid Heart Session! (Vivi°C Heart Session!)" (performed by Edel Rose Shinyusei (Junta Terashima as Shin Ichijo, Soma Saito as Yukinojo Tachibana, Taku Yashiro as Kakeru Juuouin, Tasuku Hatanaka as Taiga Kougami, Takuma Nagatsuka as Leo Saionji, Masashi Igarashi as Minato Takahashi, Yuma Uchida as Yu Suzuno))	Erika Masaki	AstroNoteS	AstroNoteS
2.	"Koi no Royal Straight Flush (恋のロイヤルストレートフラッシュ)" (performed by The Shuffle (Takayuki Kobayashi as Joji Takadanobaba GS, Wataru Komada as Kokoro Gotanda, Kotaro Hashimoto as Tsurugi Okachimachi, Norimoto Hase as Mond Uguisudani, and Takuhiro Eda as Mitsuba Kanda))	Erika Masaki	AstroNoteS	Takaya Ito
3.	"Crazy Gonna Crazy" (performed by Junta Terashima as Shin Ichijo and Shouta Aoi as Louis Kisaragi)	Tetsuya Komuro	Tetsuya Komuro	Michitomo
4.	"Reboot (Hiro ver.)" (performed by Tomoaki Maeno as Hiro Hayami)	Hitomi Mieno	Kazuhiro Yamahara	Kazuhiro Yamahara
5.	"Love Mix" (performed by Takayuki Kobayashi as Joji Takadanobaba GS)	Hitomi Mieno	Kazuhiro Yamahara	Kazuhiro Yamahara
6.	"EZ Do Dance (Thunder Storm ver.)" (performed by Shunsuke Takeuchi as Alexander Yamato VS Tasuku Hatanaka as Taiga Kougami)	Tetsuya Komuro	Tetsuya Komuro	Michitomo
7.	"Freedom (Thunder Storm ver.)" (performed by Toshiki Masuda as Kazuki Nishina)	Hitomi Mieno	Kazuhiro Yamahara	Kazuhiro Yamahara
8.	"Over the Sunshine!" (performed by Junta Terashima as Shin Ichijo)	Erika Masaki	AstroNoteS	AstroNoteS
9.	"Lunatic Destiny (ルナティックDEStiNy)" (performed by Shouta Aoi as Louis Kisaragi)	Junko Miyajima (Supa Love)	Yu (Supa Love)	Yu (Supa Love)
10.	"Pride (King of Prism ver.)" (performed by Tomoaki Maeno as Hiro Hayami)	Hitomi Mieno	Kazuhiro Yamahara	Kazuhiro Yamahara
11.	"Nijiiro Crown (虹色CROWN)" (performed by Over the Rainbow (Tetsuya Kakihara as Koji Mihama, Tomoaki Maeno as Hiro Hayami, and Toshiki Masuda as Kazuki Nishina))	Erika Masaki	AstroNoteS	AstroNoteS

Disc 2
No.	Title	Lyrics	Music	Arrangement	Length
1.	"Vivid Heart Session! (Vivi°C Heart Session!)" (Instrumental)	—	AstroNoteS	AstroNoteS
2.	"Koi no Royal Straight Flush (恋のロイヤルストレートフラッシュ)" (Instrumental)	—	AstroNoteS	Takaya Ito
3.	"Crazy Gonna Crazy" (Instrumental)	—	Tetsuya Komuro	Michitomo
4.	"Reboot (Hiro ver.)" (Instrumental)	—	Kazuhiro Yamahara	Kazuhiro Yamahara
5.	"Love Mix" (Instrumental)	—	Kazuhiro Yamahara	Kazuhiro Yamahara
6.	"EZ Do Dance (Thunder Storm ver.)" (Instrumental)	—	Tetsuya Komuro	Michitomo
7.	"Freedom (Thunder Storm ver.)" (Instrumental)	—	Kazuhiro Yamahara	Kazuhiro Yamahara
8.	"Over the Sunshine!" (Instrumental)	—	AstroNoteS	AstroNoteS
9.	"Lunatic Destiny (ルナティックDEStiNy)" (Instrumental)	—	Yu (Supa Love)	Yu (Supa Love)
10.	"Pride (King of Prism ver.)" (Instrumental)	—	Kazuhiro Yamahara	Kazuhiro Yamahara
11.	"Nijiiro Crown (虹色CROWN)" (Instrumental)	—	AstroNoteS	AstroNoteS

All tracks are written by Rei Ishizuka.

Disc 3
No.	Title	Lyrics	Music	Arrangement	Length
1.	"Main Title (メインタイトル)"	—	Rei Ishizuka	Rei Ishizuka
2.	"Minato no Yuushoku Menu (ミナトの夕食メニュー)"	—	Rei Ishizuka	Rei Ishizuka
3.	"Taiga no Omoi (タイガの想い)"	—	Rei Ishizuka	Rei Ishizuka
4.	"Hiro to Kazuki (ヒロとカヅキ)"	—	Rei Ishizuka	Rei Ishizuka
5.	"Yamada-san no Kako (山田さんの過去)"	—	Rei Ishizuka	Rei Ishizuka
6.	"Aku to Aku no Torihiki (悪と悪の取引)"	—	Rei Ishizuka	Rei Ishizuka
7.	"Hijiri no Omoi to Yamada-coach (聖の想いと山田コーチ)"	—	Rei Ishizuka	Rei Ishizuka
8.	"Yukinojo no Keiko (ユキノジョウの稽古)"	—	Rei Ishizuka	Rei Ishizuka
9.	"Juoin Momojiro no Kogoto (十王院百次朗の小言)"	—	Rei Ishizuka	Rei Ishizuka
10.	"Rei to Kazuki (冷とカヅキ)"	—	Rei Ishizuka	Rei Ishizuka
11.	"Ofuroba Nite (お風呂場にて)"	—	Rei Ishizuka	Rei Ishizuka
12.	"Hollywood no Koji (ハリウッドのコウジ)"	—	Rei Ishizuka	Rei Ishizuka
13.	"Prism Show o Yaranai? (プリズムショーをやらない?)"	—	Rei Ishizuka	Rei Ishizuka
14.	"Sorezore no Taiketsu (それぞれの対決)"	—	Rei Ishizuka	Rei Ishizuka
15.	"Hiro to Hijiri (ヒロと聖)"	—	Rei Ishizuka	Rei Ishizuka
16.	"Shutsujosha Happyo (出場者発表)"	—	Rei Ishizuka	Rei Ishizuka
17.	"Tokkun Kaishi (特訓開始)"	—	Rei Ishizuka	Rei Ishizuka
18.	"Jin no Hijo na Tokkun (仁の非情な特訓)"	—	Rei Ishizuka	Rei Ishizuka
19.	"Minato ni Tokusareta Recipe (ミナトに託されたレシピ)"	—	Rei Ishizuka	Rei Ishizuka
20.	"Arata Naru Ketsui (新たなる決意)"	—	Rei Ishizuka	Rei Ishizuka
21.	"Prism King Cup Kaimaku! (プリズムキングカップ開幕!)"	—	Rei Ishizuka	Rei Ishizuka
22.	"Jin no Inbo (仁の陰謀)"	—	Rei Ishizuka	Rei Ishizuka
23.	"Alec Tojo (アレク登場)"	—	Rei Ishizuka	Rei Ishizuka
24.	"Alec to Taiga no Shinsa Kekka (アレクとタイガの審査結果)"	—	Rei Ishizuka	Rei Ishizuka
25.	"Yusha Kettei (勝者決定)"	—	Rei Ishizuka	Rei Ishizuka
26.	"King of Prism"	—	Rei Ishizuka	Rei Ishizuka
27.	"Omoi o Komete (Unused Song) (想いを込めて(本編未使用曲))"	—	Rei Ishizuka	Rei Ishizuka

== Other media ==
A stage play adaptation summarizing both King of Prism by Pretty Rhythm and King of Prism: Pride the Hero, titled King of Prism: Over the Sunshine!, ran at Umeda Arts Theater Drama City in Osaka from November 2–5, 2017 and AiiA 2.5 Theater Tokyo from November 8–12, 2017. The play is directed by Masanari Ujikawa. Jou Aoba and Rei Ishizuka, who had worked on the original animated film as the scriptwriter and music composer respectively, returned to work on the play. The cast consists of Shohei Hashimoto as Shin, Koji Kominami as Koji, Taishi Sugie as Hiro, Takuto Omi as Kazuki, Shojiro Yokoi as Yukinojo, Ryoki Nagae as Taiga, Yoshiki Murakami as Kakeru, Yuzuki Hoshimoto as Leo, Ryota Hirono as Yu, Taiki Naito as Louis, Spi as Alexander, and Yamato Furuya as Joji. Masashi Igarashi reprised his role as Minato from the film.
