= King of Prism by Pretty Rhythm =

- Theatrical release poster
- Directed by: Masakazu Hishida
- Written by: Jou Aoba
- Starring: Tetsuya Kakihara; Tomoaki Maeno; Toshiki Masuda; Junta Terashima; Soma Saito; Tasuku Hatanaka; Taku Yashiro; Takuma Nagatsuka; Masashi Igarashi; Yuma Uchida; Shouta Aoi; Shunsuke Takeuchi
- Music by: Rei Ishizuka
- Production company: Tatsunoko Production
- Distributed by: Avex Pictures
- Release date: January 9, 2016
- Running time: 60 minutes
- Country: Japan
- Language: Japanese
- Box office: ¥800 million

King of Prism by Pretty Rhythm (stylized as KING OF PRISM by PrettyRhythm) is a 2016 Japanese animated film produced by Tatsunoko Production and Avex Pictures based on Takara Tomy's Pretty Rhythm franchise. The story focuses on side characters from the animated television series Pretty Rhythm: Rainbow Live, which aired from 2013 to 2014.

Initially released in 14 theaters on January 9, 2016, the film's unexpected popularity led to nationwide screenings of the film and became a financial success, which led to a spin-off multimedia franchise focusing on the characters. In addition, a stage play adaptation of the film titled King of Prism: Over the Sunshine! took place in 2017. King of Prism by Pretty Rhythm also led the "cheer screenings" movement in modern cinema. The film was followed up by a sequel, King of Prism: Pride the Hero, in 2017, and a third continuation, King of Prism: Shiny Seven Stars, in 2019.

== Plot ==
The Pretty Rhythm series focuses Prism Stars, idols performing figure skating routines through song and dance with special moves known as Prism Jumps. The characters participate in Prism Shows, live performances that are scored based on how charmed the audience is. The plot is set 1.5 years after Pretty Rhythm: Rainbow Live.

After Louis Kisaragi gives him a locket and instructs him to attend Over the Rainbow's Prism Show, Shin Ichijo is starstruck from the experience. While Shin bikes home, Hijiri Himuro, noticing his sparkle, sees potential in him and scouts him to become a Prism Star trainee at Edel Rose Academy. Shin becomes acquainted with his classmates but learns that Edel Rose Academy has only nine students after the death of the previous chairman, Kou Norizuki, and most of the school's funds and students have transferred over to Schwarz Rose, run by Jin Norizuki.

Shin meets the members of Over the Rainbow: Koji Mihama, Hiro Hayami, and Kazuki Nishina. The three share how they were able to perform well based on their friendship, recounting the setbacks they faced in Pretty Rhythm: Rainbow Live. That afternoon, Shin encounters Louis and thanks him for inspiring him to become a Prism Star, but Louis only responds by formally introducing himself and embracing him. At night, Hijiri becomes suspicious of Jin's next move, revealing that the members of Happy RAIN and Bell Rose were able to escape Jin's management during his takeover. However, Koji is offered an opportunity to produce music for a Hollywood movie production to pay off Edel Rose's debt. Hiro, on the other hand, decides to focus on the next Prism King Cup tournament.

While Kazuki is practicing, he is accosted by Taiga Kougami and Alexander Yamato for abandoning street-style Prism Shows to perform academy-style Prism Shows. Alexander challenges Kazuki, and the two battle to "EZ Do Dance" with Kakeru Juuouin's battle mode technology, the Prism System, but the duel ends in a draw. Meanwhile, Koji helps Shin practice for Prism Shows, and, impressed by his ability, gives him the song "Over the Sunshine!" as a reward.

After Koji accepts his new job abroad, Over the Rainbow perform a farewell concert. With Over the Rainbow now disbanded and Edel Rose's future uncertain, the other students are distraught. However, with encouragement from Hijiri and Koji, Shin performs "Over the Sunshine!" with Hiro and Kazuki, which reminds the students and the audience of the excitement they experienced when they first watched a Prism Show. The Prism Show becomes successful, and Edel Rose is determined to continue. Meanwhile, at Schwarz Rose, Jin rallies his students, one of them revealed to be Louis, to defeat Edel Rose at any cost.

The post-credits scene features a preview for a proposed continuation, where in the midst of preparations for the next Prism King Cup tournament, Hiro learns that he is unable to perform "Pride" now that the song has been given to Louis.

== Cast ==
- Tetsuya Kakihara - Koji Mihama
- Tomoaki Maeno - Hiro Hayami
- Toshiki Masuda - Kazuki Nishina
- Junta Terashima - Shin Ichijo
- Soma Saito - Yukinojo Tachibana
- Tasuku Hatanaka - Taiga Kougami
- Taku Yashiro - Kakeru Juuouin
- Takuma Nagatsuka - Leo Saionji
- Masashi Igarashi - Minato Takahashi
- Yuma Uchida - Yu Suzuno
- Shouta Aoi - Louis Kisaragi
- Shunsuke Takeuchi - Alexander Yamato
- Toshihiko Seki - Hijiri Himuro
- Daisuke Namikawa - Ryo Yamada
- Showtaro Morikubo - Rei Kurokawa
- Shinichiro Miki - Jin Norizuki

== Production ==
Pretty Rhythm director Masakazu Hishida had stressed the importance of the male characters of Pretty Rhythm: Rainbow Live, and with them debuting as Over the Rainbow in the final episode, Hiroko Nishi and Takeshi Yoda had wanted to develop a late-night 13-episode television series that would focus on them, but their original plan was rejected. When it was reworked into a film, it was rejected again, and the staff were told that if they were able to provide evidence that the project would work out, then it would be approved. From 2014 onward, the staff continued to promote various Pretty Rhythm and PriPara series at events, occasionally teasing Over the Rainbow's comeback to test the fans' feedback. When the full version of Over the Rainbow's theme song, "Athletic Core", received positive feedback, a character song album centered on them was produced. In 2015, Over the Rainbow appeared in the movie Gekijō-ban PriPara: Minna Atsumare! Prism Tours if the audience chose to view route 4, which ended with a teaser for their comeback. The film was financially successful, with fans attending the cheer screenings multiple times with glowsticks. Avex Group finally approved the film project after attending the cheer screenings.

Over the Rainbow's comeback was later confirmed at an Edel Rose event in 2015, where a VTR clip show announced that they would return in a film project in 2016 titled King of Prism by Pretty Rhythm. Staff from previous Pretty Rhythm projects returned for the film, including Hishida, Pretty Rhythm: Rainbow Live CG director Yoshihiro Otobe, and character designer Mai Matsuura.

During a live stream on December 22, 2015, Hishida addressed criticisms about the Pretty Rhythm series and revealed that the film project was given limited time and budget, leading the staff had debated how much of the story they could fit in 60 minutes. He mentioned that despite the focus on the Prism King Cup, the film would end before the characters even attended the tournament. At the time, a sequel to the film was not planned due to the uncertainty of King of Prism by Pretty Rhythm's financial success, and the post-credits preview was added to suggest what would happen if they were to create a sequel.

The film was released in Japan on January 9, 2016. 4DX theater screenings were available in 26 theaters on June 18, 2016. King of Prism by Pretty Rhythm was screened for 100 days in South Korea, with over 90,000 people in total attendance. The Los Angeles Film Festival screened the film on September 16, 2017.

== Reception ==
Initial box office revenue for King of Prism by Pretty Rhythm was poor, and there were considerations of ending the screenings after its second week. However, during the third week of screening, the film experienced a surge of popularity from fans through word-of-mouth and social media. Though King of Prism by Pretty Rhythm was initially planned to screen in 14 theaters, the popularity and financial success led the film to screen in more than 130 theaters nationwide, grossing ¥250 million at the Japanese box office within the first two months and later selling about 460,000 tickets for approximately ¥800 million. The film ended up screening in theaters for 238 days. King of Prism by Pretty Rhythm also spearheaded the "cheer screenings" movement and popularized it in modern cinema, with multiple fans who attending them several times. Fan enthusiasm during the cheer screenings have been compared to attending a live concert. The film also ranked #7 in the Newtype Anime Awards 2015–2016.

== Sequels ==
=== King of Prism: Pride the Hero ===
Originally, a sequel to King of Prism by Pretty Rhythm was not planned due to the uncertainty of its financial success, and the post-credits preview was added to suggest what would happen if they were to create a sequel. After the success of the film, a theatrical sequel titled King of Prism: Pride the Hero was announced in 2016 and released in theaters on June 10, 2017.

=== King of Prism: Shiny Seven Stars ===
King of Prism: Shiny Seven Stars was announced in 2018 as both a theatrical film and television series project. The theatrical version, consisting of four feature compilation films with three episodes condensed in each, was given limited cheer screenings from March to May 2019. The television version aired on TV Tokyo beginning April 8, 2019.

== Soundtrack ==
King or Prism by Pretty Rhythm Song & Soundtrack

Soundtrack album by Various artists
- Released: April 27, 2016
- Label: Avex Pictures
- Producer: Rei Ishizuka

The original soundtrack was produced by Rei Ishizuka, and it was released on April 27, 2016, under the name King of Prism by Pretty Rhythm Song & Soundtrack (劇場版KING OF PRISM by PrettyRhythm Song&Soundtrack). The album peaked at #4 on the Oricon Weekly Albums Chart and charted for six weeks.

Disc 1
No.	Title	Lyrics	Music	Arrangement	Length
1.	"Dramatic Love (ドラマチックLOVE)" (performed by Junta Terashima as Shin Ichijo, Soma Saito as Yukinojo Tachibana, Taku Yashiro as Kakeru Juuouin, Tasuku Hatanaka as Taiga Kougami, Takuma Nagatsuka as Leo Saionji, Masashi Igarashi as Minato Takahashi, Yuma Uchida as Yu Suzuno)	Junko Miyajima	Yu	Yu
2.	"EZ Do Dance (K.O.P. Mix)" (performed by Toshiki Masuda as Kazuki Nishina and Shunsuke Takeuchi as Alexander Yamato)	Tetsuya Komuro	Tetsuya Komuro	Michitomo
3.	"Pride (Louis ver.)" (performed by Shouta Aoi as Louis Kisaragi)	Hitomi Mieno	Kazuhiro Yamahara	Kazuhiro Yamahara
4.	"Over the Sunshine! (Shin with Over the Rainbow ver.)" (performed by Junta Terashima as Shin Ichijo with Over the Rainbow)	Erika Masaki	AstroNoteS	AstroNoteS
5.	"Audio Drama: Kakyo Matsuri wa Ōsawagi! (オーディオドラマ『華京祭は大騒ぎ！』)"	—	—	—
6.	"Dramatic Love" (inst.)	—	Yu	Yu
7.	"EZ Do Dance (K.O.P. Mix)" (inst.)	—	Tetsuya Komuro	Michitomo
8.	"Pride (Louis ver.)" (inst.)	—	Kazuhiro Yamahara	Kazuhiro Yamahara
9.	"Over the Sunshine! (Shin with Over the Rainbow ver.)" (inst.)	—	AstroNoteS	AstroNoteS

All tracks are written by Rei Ishizuka.

Disc 2
No.	Title	Lyrics	Music	Arrangement	Length
1.	"Prism Jump (プリズム・ジャンプ)"	—	Rei Ishizuka	Rei Ishizuka
2.	"Prism no Ōsha (Main Theme) (プリズムの王者(メインテーマ))"	—	Rei Ishizuka	Rei Ishizuka
3.	"Main Title 1 (メインタイトル 1)"	—	Rei Ishizuka	Rei Ishizuka
4.	"Main Title 2 (メインタイトル 2)"	—	Rei Ishizuka	Rei Ishizuka
5.	"Yukinojō no Henka (ユキノジョウ変化)"	—	Rei Ishizuka	Rei Ishizuka
6.	"Hatsu Tōkō (初登校)"	—	Rei Ishizuka	Rei Ishizuka
7.	"Ryo no Annai (寮の案内)"	—	Rei Ishizuka	Rei Ishizuka
8.	"Reihaidō Nite (礼拝堂にて)"	—	Rei Ishizuka	Rei Ishizuka
9.	"Obare to Deai (オバレとの出逢い)"	—	Rei Ishizuka	Rei Ishizuka
10.	"San-nin no Kataru Kako Hanashi (Kakushitsu) (三人の語る過去話(確執))"	—	Rei Ishizuka	Rei Ishizuka
11.	"San-nin no Kataru Kako Hanashi (Wakai) (三人の語る過去話(和解))"	—	Rei Ishizuka	Rei Ishizuka
12.	"Louis (ルヰ)"	—	Rei Ishizuka	Rei Ishizuka
13.	"Prism Sono Ai (Ai no Theme) (PRISM その愛(愛のテーマ))"	—	Rei Ishizuka	Rei Ishizuka
14.	"Yokujo Nite (浴場にて)"	—	Rei Ishizuka	Rei Ishizuka
15.	"Hijiri to Rei (聖と冷)"	—	Rei Ishizuka	Rei Ishizuka
16.	"Taiketsu (対決)"	—	Rei Ishizuka	Rei Ishizuka
17.	"Kazuki vs Alec (カヅキ vs アレク)"	—	Rei Ishizuka	Rei Ishizuka
18.	"Sorezore no Omoi (それぞれの思い)"	—	Rei Ishizuka	Rei Ishizuka
19.	"Schwarz Rose (シュワルツローズ)"	—	Rei Ishizuka	Rei Ishizuka
20.	"Koji no Tabidachi (コウジの旅立ち)"	—	Rei Ishizuka	Rei Ishizuka
21.	"Kagayaku Mirai (輝く未来)"	—	Rei Ishizuka	Rei Ishizuka
22.	"Dokusaisha Jin (独裁者・仁)"	—	Rei Ishizuka	Rei Ishizuka
23.	"Sabishii Ōsha (Main Theme Hensō) (寂しい王者(メインテーマ変奏))"	—	Rei Ishizuka	Rei Ishizuka
24.	"Tanoshii Cycling (楽しいサイクリング)"	—	Rei Ishizuka	Rei Ishizuka
25.	"Shin to Louis (シンとルヰ)"	—	Rei Ishizuka	Rei Ishizuka
26.	"Tanoshii Shokuji (楽しい食事)"	—	Rei Ishizuka	Rei Ishizuka
27.	"Gokai (誤解)"	—	Rei Ishizuka	Rei Ishizuka
28.	"Battle (バトル)"	—	Rei Ishizuka	Rei Ishizuka
29.	"San-nin no Kataru Kako Hanashi (Kaisō Scene) (三人の語る過去話(回想シーン))"	—	Rei Ishizuka	Rei Ishizuka

== Other media ==
=== Stage play ===
A stage play adaptation summarizing both King of Prism by Pretty Rhythm and King of Prism: Pride the Hero, titled King of Prism: Over the Sunshine!, ran at Umeda Arts Theater Drama City in Osaka from November 2–5, 2017 and AiiA 2.5 Theater Tokyo from November 8–12, 2017. The play is directed by Masanari Ujikawa. Jou Aoba and Rei Ishizuka, who had worked on the original animated film as the scriptwriter and music composer respectively, returned to work on the play. The cast consists of Shohei Hashimoto as Shin, Koji Kominami as Koji, Taishi Sugie as Hiro, Takuto Omi as Kazuki, Shojiro Yokoi as Yukinojo, Ryoki Nagae as Taiga, Yoshiki Murakami as Kakeru, Yuzuki Hoshimoto as Leo, Ryota Hirono as Yu, Taiki Naito as Louis, Spi as Alexander, and Yamato Furuya as Joji. Masashi Igarashi reprised his role as Minato from the film.

=== Manga ===
A manga adaptation titled King of Prism by Pretty Rhythm Party Time was drawn by Sumika Sumio and serialized in Monthly GFantasy. A manga anthology titled King of Prism by Pretty Rhythm Comic Anthology was released in 2016.
