= Even a Dad Still Wants It... =

Japanese manga series

- Cover of the Japanese version of vol. 1, first published on May 18, 2018

パパだって、したい (Papa Datte, Shitai)
- Genre: Boys' love
- Manga
- Written by: Serina Seo
- Published by: Suiseisha
- English publisher: Coolmic
- Imprint: Glanz BL Comics
- Magazine: Screamo
- Original run: May 2017 – present
- Volumes: 4
- Anime television series
- Directed by: Mitsutaka Noshitani
- Produced by: Picante Circus
- Written by: Ayumi Saitō
- Studio: Magic Bus
- Licensed by: Coolmic
- Original network: Tokyo MX
- Original run: January 6, 2019 – February 22, 2019
- Episodes: 8

Even a Dad Still Wants It... (Japanese: パパだって、したい, Hepburn: Papa Datte, Shitai; lit. "I'm a Father, But I Want to Do it") is a Japanese boys' love manga series by Serina Seo. An anime adaptation by ComicFesta was broadcast in January 2019 in two versions.

== Plot ==
Fourth-year college student Kōya Asumi takes a part-time job as a housekeeper and is hired by Keiichi Naruse, a single father. Kōya becomes attracted to Keiichi, and the two begin a relationship.

== Characters ==
Kōya Asumi (阿澄 皇哉, Asumi Kōya)
Voiced by: Masahiro Yamanaka
Keiichi Naruse (成瀬 圭壱, Naruse Keiichi)
Voiced by: Junta Terashima
Ichika Naruse (成瀬 壱佳, Naruse Ichika)
Voiced by: Nozomi Furuki
Ryōhei Yui (成瀬 圭壱, Yui Ryōhei)
Voiced by: Yusuke Shirai

== Media ==
=== Manga ===
Papa Datte, Shitai is written and illustrated by Serina Seo (世尾せりな, Seo Serina). It is serialized digitally on Screamo under their BL Screamo label beginning in May 2017. The chapters were later released in 4 bound volumes by Suiseisha under the Glanz BL Comics imprint. On September 13, 2023, the manga was licensed in English and is distributed through Manga Planet and Coolmic.

No.	Japanese release date	Japanese ISBN
1	May 18, 2018	978-4-434-24508-4
2	December 18, 2018	978-4-434-25307-2
3	June 18, 2019	978-4-434-25948-7
4	April 18, 2020	978-4-434-27190-8

=== Anime ===
In December 2018, ComicFesta announced that they were creating an anime adaptation, and it was slated to debut on January 6, 2019, on Tokyo MX. The anime is produced by Magic Bus, with Misutaka Noshitani as director, Ayumi Saitō as scriptwriter, Taihei Nagai as the character designer, Takahiro Enomoto as the sound direction, and Studio Mausu handling sound production. Like ComicFesta's other series, two versions of the anime were produced: a standard version for television broadcast, and a complete version including sexual content for streaming on ComicFesta Anime's website. The theme song is "Home Sweet Home" by Masahiro Yamanaka and Junta Terashima, the voice actors of Kōya Asumi and Keiichi Naruse. Both versions of the first episode was screened in advance at a promotional event in Lefkada Shinjuku on December 30, 2018.

No.	Title	Directed by	Original release date
1	"I'm a Father... But There Are Times I Can't Hold Back"; Transliteration: "Oyaji datte... Gaman Dekinai Toki ga Arun Desu" (Japanese: 父親だって…我慢できないときがあるんです)	Masahiro Kitagawa	December 30, 2018 (advance screening), January 6, 2019 (television broadcast)
2	"Can I Touch You if We're Alone Together?"; Transliteration: "Futari Kiri nara, Sawatte Ii no?" (Japanese: 二人きりなら、触っていいの？)	Masahiro Kitagawa	January 11, 2019
3	"Sometimes It's Fine to Spoil a Father"; Transliteration: "Papa mo Tama ni wa Amaetara Iin Desu" (Japanese: パパもたまには甘えたらいいんです)	Masahiro Kitagawa	January 18, 2019
4	"I Want to Help You with As Much As I Can... From Now on" Transliteration: "Ore ga Dekiru Koto o Tetsudaitai... Kore Kara mo" (Japanese: 俺ができることを手伝いたい…これからも)	Masahiro Kitagawa	January 25, 2019
5	"I Want it to Be More Than Just Work..."; Transliteration: "Hontō wa Shigoto to Shite Janakute, Motto..." (Japanese: 本当は仕事としてじゃなくて、もっと…)	Misutaka Noshitani	February 1, 2019
6	"Why... Won't You Understand I Was Serious?"; Transliteration: "Nande... Honki Datte Wakatte Kurenainda" (Japanese: なんで…本気だってわかってくれないんだ)	Misutaka Noshitani	February 8, 2019
7	"I Love You... to the Point I Don't Know What to Do"; Transliteration: "Suki nanda... Dōshiyō mo Nai Kurai" (Japanese: 好きなんだ…どうしようもないくらい)	Misutaka Noshitani	February 15, 2019
8	"I'm Prepared"; Transliteration: "Kakugo, Kimatta" (Japanese: 覚悟、決まった)	Misutaka Noshitani	February 22, 2019
