= Junta Terashima =

Japanese voice actor, narrator, and singer (born 1988)

- 寺島 惇太
- Born: August 11, 1988 (age 38); Nagano Prefecture, Japan
- Occupations: Voice actor; narrator; singer
- Years active: 2009–present
- Agent: Kenyu Office
- Height: 173 cm (5 ft 8 in)
- Website: www.juntaterashima.com

Junta Terashima (寺島 惇太, Terashima Junta; born August 11, 1988) is a Japanese voice actor, narrator, and singer. He debuted as a voice actor in 2009. Notable roles played by him include Hyōga Yukimura in Inazuma Eleven Go, Shin Ichijo in the King of Prism series, Takeru Taiga in The Idolmaster SideM, Code in Boruto, and Hisoka Mikage in A3!. In addition to voice acting, Terashima also started a singing career in 2019 with the release of the extended plays 29 + 1: Miso and Joy Source.

== Discography ==
=== Extended plays ===
List of extended plays, with selected chart positions, sales figures and certifications
Title	EP details	Peak chart positions		Sales
Title	EP details	JPN Oricon	JPN Hot	Sales
29 + 1: Miso	Released: March 3, 2019; Label: Feel Mee; Formats: CD, digital download	18	28	JPN: 4,254
Joy Source	Released: October 23, 2019; Label: Feel Mee; Formats: CD, digital download	21	24	JPN: 3,198
Soul to	Released: December 1, 2021; Label: Dreamusic; Formats: CD, digital download	50	—	JPN: 1,114
"—" denotes releases that did not chart or were not released in that region.

== Filmography ==
=== Anime ===
Year	Title	Role	Network	Notes
2011	Inazuma Eleven GO	Hyōga Yukimura	TV Tokyo	
2016	Haikyu!! Second Season	Kōsuke Sakunami, Takeharu Futamata	MBS	
2017	TsukiPro the Animation	Mamoru Fujimura	Tokyo MX	
2019	Even a Dad Still Wants It...	Keiichi Naruse	Tokyo MX	
2019	Kono Oto Tomare! Sounds of Life	Ōsuke Kiryū	Tokyo MX	
2019	Ao-chan Can't Study!	Takumi Kijima	MBS	
2020	Haikyu!! To The Top	Kōsuke Sakunami	MBS	
2020	A3! Season Autumn & Winter	Hisoka Mikage	Tokyo MX	
2020	Boruto: Naruto Next Generations	Code	TV Tokyo	
2022	Tribe Nine	Fucho Sonoda	Tokyo MX	
2023	Paradox Live the Animation	Shiki Andō	Tokyo MX	
2024	Grandpa and Grandma Turn Young Again	Shōta	AT-X	
2024	I Parry Everything	Rein	TBA	

=== Film ===
Year	Title	Role	Notes
2015	King of Prism by Pretty Rhythm	Shin Ichijo	Lead role
2016	King of Prism: Pride the Hero	Shin Ichijo	Lead role
2019	King of Prism: Shiny Seven Stars	Shin Ichijo	Lead role
2025	The Rose of Versailles	Pierre	
2025	Toi-san	Hideki Otaku	

=== Video games ===
Year	Title	Role	Notes
2011	Inazuma Eleven Go	Hyōga Yukimura	
2016	The Idolmaster SideM	Takeru Taiga	
2016	Bungo and Alchemist	Miyoshi Tatsuji	
2017	A3!	Hisoka Mikage	Winter troupe
2017	King of Prism: Prism Rush! Live	Shin Ichijo	
2017	Anidol Colors	Yuki Asahi	
2018	Judgment	Fumiya Sugiura	
2019	Ensemble Stars!	Shin Ichijo	Collaboration with King of Prism
2020	Atelier Ryza 2: Lost Legends & the Secret Fairy	Tao Mongarten	
2021	100% Orange Juice!	Lone Rider	
2021	Lost Judgment	Fumiya Sugiura	
2023	Atelier Ryza 3: Alchemist of the End & the Secret Key	Tao Mongarten	
2023	Pokémon Masters EX	Rei	
2024	Break My Case	Yuragi Kanno	Simulation department
2024	18 Trip	Tao Kinouchi	
2025	Genshin Impact	Ifa	Japanese version; replaced Showtaro Morikubo
2026	Love and Deepspace	Zayne	Japanese version; replaced Takuya Satō

=== Drama CDs ===
Year	Title	Role	Notes
2022	Dear Vocalist	JIN	Member of Jet Rat Fury

=== Multimedia projects ===
Year	Title	Role	Notes
2015	TsukiPro	Mamoru Fujimura	Member of Growth
2019	Paradox Live	Shiki Ando	Member of The Cat's Whiskers

=== Dubbing ===
Year	Title	Role	Notes
2019	The Bears' Famous Invasion of Sicily	Tonio	
2023	Jesus Revolution	Greg Laurie	
