= King of Prism: Shiny Seven Stars =

- Theatrical release poster
- Directed by: Masakazu Hishida
- Written by: Jou Aoba
- Starring: Junta Terashima; Soma Saito; Tasuku Hatanaka; Taku Yashiro; Takuma Nagatsuka; Masashi Igarashi; Yuma Uchida; Shouta Aoi; Shunsuke Takeuchi; Tomokazu Sugita; Takayuki Kobayashi
- Music by: Rei Ishizuka
- Production company: Tatsunoko Production
- Distributed by: Avex Pictures
- Release dates: March 2, 2019 (I); March 23, 2019 (II); April 13, 2019 (III); May 4, 2019 (IV)
- Running time: 90 minutes (per film)
- Country: Japan
- Language: Japanese
- Box office: ¥320 million (total)

King of Prism: Shiny Seven Stars is a 2019 Japanese animated film and television series project produced by Tatsunoko Production and Avex Pictures based on Takara Tomy's Pretty Rhythm franchise. The story is a spin-off of the animated television series Pretty Rhythm: Rainbow Live, which aired from 2013 to 2014. Shiny Seven Stars is the third film of the King of Prism film series, released as the direct sequel to the 2016 film King of Prism by Pretty Rhythm and the 2017 film King of Prism: Pride the Hero.

The theatrical edition is a 4-part film series that screened in nationwide Japanese theaters from March 2 to May 4, 2019, with three episodes condensed in each. The television version aired weekly on TV Tokyo from April 15, 2019, to July 1, 2019.

== Plot ==
=== I: Prologue × Yukinojo × Taiga ===
After the events of King of Prism: Pride the Hero, Yukinojo is continuously pressured by his father to quit Prism Shows to focus on kabuki. His mother reveals to him that despite his father not being born into the Tachibana family, he was able to become a talented kabuki actor by inheriting its "soul", comparing his passion to Yukinojo's passion for Prism Shows. The Edel Rose freshmen are also assigned to perform at the Towada Red Salmon Princess Event during the Aomori Nebuta Festival in Taiga's hometown. Due to Edel Rose's financial crisis, the Edel Rose freshmen stay at Taiga's house, where his sister reveals how Taiga became inspired by Kazuki to become a Prism Star after they once moved to Tokyo. When Schwarz Rose's float fails to arrive in time for the parade, Taiga performs a Prism Show to prevent the festival from being cancelled.

Jin launches the Prism 1 Grand Prix and challenges Edel Rose to a school-wide duel. Seven students from each school will both have solo Prism Shows with 10000 karats maximum and a group performance with 20000 karats maximum. The winning school will receive ¥1 billion. Yukinojo performs "Hyakka Ryoran" with four jumps, earning 9070 karats and putting Edel Rose in the lead, while also gaining his father's approval to continue performing in Prism Shows. Taiga performs "Fly in the Sky" at the Prism 1 with three Prism Jumps, earning 8240 karats and putting Edel Rose in the lead with 17310 karats.

=== II: Kakeru × Joji × Minato ===
A month before the Prism 1, Kakeru is sent to Juuouin Holdings' Madagascar branch as punishment for allowing the Itsutomo Group to help develop the Prism System without consulting the staff. Meanwhile, Sanada plans to use Juuouin Holdings to expand Schwarz Rose's company projects, destroying Edel Rose in the process. In Madagascar, Kakeru meets Livingston, the branch's manager, and Merina, a descendant of the royal family, to whom he confides to about his family's company going corrupt and his desire to improve as the company's heir through the passion of Prism Shows. Minato returns to his hometown in Shizuoka, where he reflects on Koji inspiring him to become a Prism Star and becoming a better chef. After doubting his skills in both Prism Shows and cooking, he considers leaving Edel Rose, but he reconsiders after a talk with his parents. Joji's childhood friend, Miyo, visits him, while Ace learns about his past.

In present time, Kakeru performs "Orange Flamingo" at the Prism 1 and does two Prism Jumps including a Cyalume Change, earning 8780 karats with Edel Rose still leading. When Joji performs "Joker Kiss" at Prism 1, Trigen, members of a subunit in YMT29, unplug Ace's microphone so that he is unable to sing. The mishap is dismissed as a technical difficulty and Joji is allowed to perform again, performing four jumps with Ace's help and earning 9270 karats. In the end, Joji is made a solo act while Ace is appointed as the new leader of The Shuffle. Minato performs to "Sailing" and lands two Prism Jumps, earning 8450 karats.

=== III: Leo × Yu × Alec ===
Before the Prism 1 begins, Over the Rainbow suggests the Edel Rose freshmen crossdress and enter the Miss Kakyoin Contest at their school to keep the title to the school's students. However, when Leo's older sisters Kirari and Yurari visit, Leo pretends to be manly. He confides to the Edel Rose freshmen that he came to Edel Rose to become more masculine, as he had been bullied as a child for his feminine interests. When Kirari and Yurari inform him that they are giving up pursuing fashion design, he decides not to give up on his dream to be a Prism Star, eventually accepting himself as is. At the Miss Kakyoin Contest, Leo puts on a Prism Show and earns first place.

Yu falls under pressure of composing all their songs, including their group song. The Edel Rose freshmen take a trip, but Yu angrily runs off and gets lost in the woods. The other boys realize that Yu wants to escape the shadow of his sister, Ito, a successful Prism Star, and apologize. Alexander grows up admiring Rei Kurokawa for saving him from bullies as a child. Inspired to become a street-style Prism Star like him, Alexander trains to claim the title as the most charismatic street-style Prism Star and gains a Pair Friend named Dorachi.

In present time, at the Prism 1, Leo performs "Twinkle Twinkle" and lands two Prism Jumps with a Prism Change, earning 7890 karats. Yu performs to "Shiny Stellar" with a Prism Live and one Prism Jump, earning 7750 karats. Alexander performs "Survival Dance (No No Cry More)", but fearing that he will destroy the stadium again, Taiga engages him in a Prism Battle, where they compete with a new Prism Rush setting. Taiga wins, but Alexander uses their duel to excite the audience and earns 8660 karats. Taiga is given a 50% score penalty for interfering, putting Schwarz Rose in the lead.

=== IV: Louis × Shin × Unknown ===
The Prism World creates the Rinne/Shine program to guide Prism Stars of their respective gender in spreading the Prism Sparkle. However, believing male Prism Stars to be selfish, Shine defies orders and becomes a Prism Star himself under the name Wataru Hibiki. Rinne seals Shine, but her copies become erratic without him, forcing the Prism World to create a new version of her to handle male Prism Stars: the Louis program. Shine is sealed inside Shin's body when he watches a meteor shower in his childhood. During the events of King of Prism by Pretty Rhythm and King of Prism: Pride the Hero, Louis reawakens Shine inside of Shin and defects from the Prism World.

In present time, at the Prism 1, Louis performs "I Know Shangri-La" with a routine based on their date, having realized that he is in love with Shin instead of Shine. Shine awakens during Louis' Prism Jump, and when Louis tries to subdue him, Shine mentions that if he dies, Shin will lose his ability to perform Prism Jumps and his memories beginning from when Shine was first awakened in him. Shine defeats Louis, causing him to fall unconscious and earn 4950 karats.

Shin falls unconscious when he is about to perform and reawakens with no memory of his Prism Show. While replaying footage, he discovers Shine took control of his body to perform "Platonic Sword" with a Prism Axel, a move using several simultaneous Prism Jumps. He scored 0 karats due to terrifying the audience, while The Shuffle's group performance scores 13450 karats, making Schwarz Rose the winner by default. Hijiri encourages the Edel Rose freshmen to perform their group song anyway to entertain the audience.

Shin apologizes to the audience for frightening them, and the Edel Rose freshmen perform "Nanairo Chikai (Brilliant Oath)" as Edel Rose 7 Stars. During their Prism Show, the Prism World cuts off the Prism Sparkle, rendering them unable to continue, but with the audience's support, a new Prism Goddess resembling Rinne is established and the Prism Sparkle returns. Shine is sealed, and the Edel Rose 7 Stars earn 20000 karats for their performance. Despite their loss, Jin has a change of heart and does not destroy Edel Rose, while the Edel Rose 7 Stars move to Over the Rainbow's agency and debut under the name Septentrion.

== Promotion ==
To promote the release of Shiny Seven Stars, the mobile app, King of Prism: Prism Rush! Live included a story event titled "Road to Shiny Seven Stars" to portray the events between the 2017 film King of Prism: Pride the Hero and Shiny Seven Stars.

== Release ==
The theatrical version consisting of four feature compilation films, with three episodes condensed in each, were given limited cheer screenings from March to May 2019. The first film, King of Prism: Shiny Seven Stars I: Prologue × Yukinojo × Taiga, opened on March 2, 2019. The second film, King of Prism: Shiny Seven Stars II: Kakeru × Joji × Minato, opened on March 23, 2019. The third film, King of Prism: Shiny Seven Stars III: Leo × Yu × Alec, opened on April 13, 2019. The final film, King of Prism: Shiny Seven Stars IV: Louis × Shin × Unknown, opened on May 4, 2019. The opening theme song is "Shiny Seven Stars!" The ending theme song for the theatrical version is "366 Love Diary."

=== Television broadcast ===
The television version aired weekly on TV Tokyo at 1:35 AM beginning from April 15 to July 1, 2019, with all four films split into 12 episodes. Crunchyroll licensed the show for English distribution. The ending theme of the television version features cover versions of TRF's most popular songs from each character.

No.	Title	Directed by	Written by	Original release date
1	"Hiro Hayami, Koji Mihama, Kazuki Nishina: Beyond the Rainbow (ep. 0 prologue)" Transliteration: "Hayami Hiro, Mihama Kōji, Nishina Kazuki: Niji o Kazoeta Sono Saki ni" (Japanese: 速水ヒロ 神浜コウジ 仁科カヅキ 虹を越えたその先に)	Masakazu Hishida	Rei Ishizuka	April 15, 2019
2	"Yukinojo Tachibana Has Arrived! (ep. 02 Every man is his own worst devil.)" Transliteration: "Tachibana Yukinojō: Iza, Mairu!" (Japanese: 太刀花ユキノジョウ いざ、参る！)	Masakazu Hishida	Rei Ishizuka	April 22, 2019
3	"Taiga Kougami: The Festival! Is Inside Me! (ep. 03 Midsummer's Nebuta Dream)"; Transliteration: "Kōgami Taiga: Matsuri Nara! Ore no Naka ni Aru!" (Japanese: 香賀美タイガ 祭りなら！俺の中にある！)	Masakazu Hishida	Rei Ishizuka	April 29, 2019
4	"Kakeru Juuouin: Soaring with Love (ep. 04 Kill not flamingo that lays golden eggs.)" Transliteration: "Jūōin Kakeru: Ai to Tomo ni Kakeru" (Japanese: 十王院カケル 愛と共に翔ける)	Masakazu Hishida	Rei Ishizuka	May 6, 2019
5	"The Shuffle: Joji's Song (ep. 08 Fatal? Attraction)"; Transliteration: "THE Shaffuru: Jōji no Uta" (Japanese: THE シャッフル ジョージの唄)	Masakazu Hishida	Rei Ishizuka	May 13, 2019
6	"Minato Takahashi: My Heart is an Ocean (ep. 05 A good appetite is a good Prism Show.)"; Transliteration: "Takanashi Minato: Kokoro wa Ōkki na Taiheisō" (Japanese: 鷹梁ミナト 心は大っきな太平洋)	Masakazu Hishida	Rei Ishizuka	May 20, 2019
7	"Leo Saionji: Flowers Blooming in Your ♡ (ep. 06 The flower that comes out in adversity is the rarest and most beautiful of all.)" Transliteration: "Saionji Reo: Kokoro no Hana o Sakasemashō" (Japanese: 西園寺レオ 心の花を咲かせましょう♡)	Masakazu Hishida	Rei Ishizuka	May 27, 2019
8	"Yu Suzuno: I am Zeus (ep. 07 I make constellations, I live in constellations.)" Transliteration: "Suzuno Yū: Ai Amu Zeusu" (Japanese: 涼野ユウ アイアム ゼウス☆彡)	Masakazu Hishida	Rei Ishizuka	June 3, 2019
9	"Alexander Yamato: The Charisma of Street (ep. 09 Show a gratitude without any words.)" Transliteration: "Yamato Arekusandā: The Charisma of Street" (Japanese: 大和アレクサンダー THE CHARISMA OF STREET)	Masakazu Hishida	Rei Ishizuka	June 10, 2019
10	"Louis Kisaragi: Prism Emissary (ep. 10 I was programmed to love you.)" Transliteration: "Kisaragi Rui: Purizumu no Shisha" (Japanese: 如月ルヰ プリズムの使者)	Masakazu Hishida	Rei Ishizuka	June 17, 2019
11	"Shin Ichijo: Sin (ep. 01 There is strong shadow where there is much shine.)" Transliteration: "Ichijō Shin: Sin" (Japanese: 一条 シン SIN)	Masakazu Hishida	Rei Ishizuka	June 24, 2019
12	"Shiny Seven Stars Forever!"	Masakazu Hishida	Rei Ishizuka	July 1, 2019

== Reception ==
The theatrical release of all four films grossed a consecutive total of ¥320 million, with over 190,000 attendees. King of Prism: Shiny Seven Stars IV: Louis × Shin × Unknown, opened at #1 on opening day and #9 on opening weekend.
