= Pretty Rhythm =

Japanese multimedia franchise

- Official logo for the series
- Created by: Syn Sophia; Takara Tomy Arts
- Original work: Pretty Rhythm: Mini Skirt
- Years: 2010–present

Print publications
- Comics: See below

Films and television
- Film: See below
- Television series: See below

Games
- Video game: See below

Miscellaneous
- Toy: Takara Tomy Arts
- Clothing: Prism Stone; Dear Crown

Pretty Rhythm (プリティーリズム, Puritī Rizumu) is a Japanese arcade game series and multimedia franchise produced by Syn Sophia and Takara Tomy Arts aimed at girls in elementary school. The Pretty Rhythm franchise was first launched in July 2010 with the rhythm and dress-up arcade video game Pretty Rhythm: Mini Skirt. After the original Pretty Rhythm games ended service in July 2014, Takara Tomy began publishing the PriPara Series in 2014 to 2018, It was then followed up by Kiratto Pri Chan in 2018 to 2021, Waccha PriMagi! in 2021 to 2022, AiPri Series in 2024 to 2027, with all series grouped under the collective name Pretty Series (プリティーシリーズ, Puritī Shirīzu). A spin-off media franchise, King of Prism, was launched in 2016 focusing on the male characters featured in the 2013 anime Pretty Rhythm: Rainbow Live, which was aimed at an older female audience.

The popularity of the games has led to several anime and manga adaptations. In addition, the Pretty Rhythm franchise has also inspired a junior apparel brand, Prism Stone. In 2012, one of their fashion events previously held the Guinness World Records for having the most models modeling on the catwalk.

== Development ==
The Pretty Rhythm arcade games were created out of demand for the lack of arcade games targeted towards young girls in supermarkets. As Syn Sophia had produced the Style Savvy series, Takara Tomy Arts asked them to collaborate on another game for the same demographic. The development team gave the game a fashion focus, particularly on the idea that players could receive a "Prism Stone" to accessorize their outfits with every ¥100 they spend. The development team also intended for the game's presentation to be like the Cirque du Soleil, where they finally came up with the concepts of "dance", "skating" and "jumps." To create the Prism Jumps, they referenced videos from figure skating competitions and added special effects to make them more visually attractive, with names for the Prism Jumps that were easy to remember. A costume designer designed the clothing in the game, and programmer Daisuke Kato attempted to balance the varieties of clothing in order to encourage the player to try different outfits. Pretty Rhythm went into development in 2009 before releasing in July 2010 with Pretty Rhythm: Mini Skirt.

== Video games ==
Release timeline
2010	Pretty Rhythm: Mini Skirt (season 1-3)
2011	Pretty Rhythm: Aurora Dream (season 4-8)
2012	Pretty Rhythm: Dear My Future (season 9-11)
2013	Pretty Rhythm: My Deco Rainbow Wedding (3DS)
2013	Pretty Rhythm: Rainbow Live (session 1-2)
2013	Pretty Rhythm: Rainbow Live Duo (session 3-5)
2013	Pretty Rhythm: Rainbow Live: Kirakira My Design (3DS)
2014	Pretty Rhythm: All Star Legend Coord Edition
2015	PriPara & Pretty Rhythm: PriPara de Tsukaeru Oshare Item 1450! (3DS)
2015	Pretty Rhythm Shake (Android & iOS)

The Pretty Rhythm series focuses on Prism Stars, idols performing figure skating routines through song and dance with special moves known as Prism Jumps. The characters participate in Prism Shows, live performances that are scored based on how charmed the audience is. The game is a rhythm game where players must match the beat of the song by pressing buttons corresponding to the pink and blue hearts on the screen. The game costs ¥100 to play for solo mode, and beginning with Pretty Rhythm: Rainbow Live Duo, costs ¥200 to play duo mode. Each machine is compatible with Prism Stones, collectible heart-shaped gems containing custom clothing for the player character, and Memory Passes, which allow players to save their game's progress. Five different types of Prism Stones, each representing a clothing category, can be used at the same time during game playthrough to customize the player character's appearance, with certain clothing and stage combinations providing bonus points. Players are awarded Prism Stones, which are deposited from the machine, before the game begins.

=== Pretty Rhythm: Mini Skirt ===
Pretty Rhythm: Mini Skirt, the first version of the game, was launched in arcades on July 15, 2010. At the time of the game's launch, a total of 84 variations of Prism Stones were produced, featuring approximately 200,000 possible outfit combinations. The game also included the song "Mini Skirt no Yosei" as a playable stage, which was performed by then-trainee members from AKB48, Miyu Takeuchi, Anna Mori, and Haruka Shimada under the group name Mini Skirt. The season 2 update of the game, the "Fall Collection", launched on October 14, 2010. For a limited time, the members of Mini Skirt were featured in a playable stage that awarded players a Prism Stone with their uniforms, and they were featured in promotional material regarding the expansion. Season 3, "Collection Season 3", launched on January 20, 2011.

=== Pretty Rhythm: Aurora Dream ===
Beginning with season 4, the game was relaunched under the name Pretty Rhythm: Aurora Dream on April 28, 2011, to coincide with the anime adaptation tie-in, with Aira Harune added as a playable character. The game also featured a new system called a "Surprise Jump." Season 5, "Bato Pon Edition", launched on July 21, 2011. Season 6, "Idol Debut Edition", launched on September 29, 2011. Season 7, "Pretty Remake Edition", launched on December 15, 2011, and added Mion Takamine as a playable character. Season 8, "Prism Queen Edition", launched on February 12, 2012.

=== Pretty Rhythm: Dear My Future ===
Pretty Rhythm: Dear My Future was launched on April 26, 2012, with its season 9 update, "Prizmmy Debut Edition", as a tie-in to the animated adaptation of the same name, which included new characters Mia Ageha, Reina Miyama, Karin Shijimi, and Ayami Oruri, fictional versions of the girl group Prizmmy. The game featured a new system that focuses on "Prism Acts." Season 10, "Pretty Debut Edition", was launched on July 19, 2012, adding Hye-in, So-min, Shi-yoon, Chae-kyung, and Jae-eun, the fictionalized versions of the girl group of Puretty, as playable characters. Season 11, "Dear My Future Team Shuffle Edition", was launched on September 27, 2012.

=== Pretty Rhythm: Rainbow Live / Rainbow Live Duo ===
Pretty Rhythm: Rainbow Live was launched on April 18, 2013, as a new series and tie-in to the animated adaptation of the same name, which introduced a new mode called "Prism Live", where the player character can enter a bonus round to score more points with Prism Jump combinations. Pair Friends were also introduced in the game. The session 1 update was titled the "Prism Live Debut Edition" and added Naru Ayase, Ann Fukuhara, and Ito Suzuno as playable characters, along with Rinne, who had previously appeared in the Nintendo 3DS game Pretty Rhythm: My Deco Rainbow Wedding. The session 2 update, "All Rare! Ki-ra-me-ki Days Edition", was launched on July 11, 2013, and added Bell Renjoji, Otoha Takanashi, and Wakana Morizono as playable characters.

The session 3 update, "Chara Stone! Heartbeat Edition", was launched on October 3, 2013, and the game was rebranded under the title Pretty Rhythm: Rainbow Live Duo. The session 3 update added June Amou as a playable character and a two-player co-op mode called "Duo Mode" to perform Prism Lives together. The session 4 update, "Surprise! Winter White Edition", was launched on January 25, 2014, with Starn available as a Pair Friend. It also included a special mode that was only accessible with the Prism Memory Pass.

=== Pretty Rhythm: All Star Legend Coord Edition ===
Beginning April 17, 2014, the arcade game was retitled Pretty Rhythm: All Star Legend Coord Edition with 84 new Prism Stone designs produced. Pretty Rhythm ended services in July 2014 and was pulled from arcades afterwards, with a few machines remaining in the Prism Stone shops located in Harajuku, Sapporo, Fukuoka, and Nagoya. While the Memory Passes and Prism Stones are still functional, Prism Stones are no longer being produced. On March 24, 2024, the official Twitter account announced that they were retiring the Pretty Rhythm arcade machines beginning on April 3, 2024.

=== Other Games ===
A Nintendo 3DS port of Pretty Rhythm: Mini Skirt, titled Pretty Rhythm: My Deco Rainbow Wedding, was released on March 20, 2013. A new character, Rinne, was added as a playable character in the game, as well as the female cast from Pretty Rhythm: Aurora Dream and Pretty Rhythm: Dear My Future. Progressing through the game allowed players to unlock QR codes for new outfits that were compatible with the arcade game. The limited-edition version of the game came with the Rainbow Wedding Prism Stone that could be used in the arcade game. The game sold 33,466 copies in its first week of sales and 61,366 copies by June 2013.

Pretty Rhythm: Rainbow Live: Kirakira My Design was released for the Nintendo 3DS on November 28, 2013. The game features the main female cast of Rainbow Live as playable characters along with a new character, Cosmo Hojo, as well as the female cast from Pretty Rhythm: Aurora Dream and Pretty Rhythm: Dear My Future. The game sold 35,511 copies by the end of 2013.

An expanded version of Kirakira My Design was released for the Nintendo 3DS on January 5, 2015, under the title PriPara & Pretty Rhythm: PriPara de Tsukaeru Oshare Item 1450!, adding Hiro Hayami and PriPara character Laala Manaka as playable characters. The game also included QR codes for unlockable secret outfits in the PriPara arcade game.

On March 7, 2015, a smartphone app mobile game titled Pretty Rhythm Shake was released for the Android and iOS, with pre-registrations opening on February 10, 2015, for a limited edition in-game card of Rinne. The game was part of the Shake rhythm game series produced by Dooub. In the game, the player must match the falling hearts to three corresponding hearts to the beat of the song and use virtual Prism Stones accumulated from each play to level up their characters. The game primarily focused on the main cast of Pretty Rhythm: Rainbow Live, but proceeding through the game will provide Aurora Dream and Dear My Future characters and songs as unlockable content, as well as the male supporting cast of Rainbow Live. Avex Pictures ended services for the game on May 31, 2017, due to "various reasons."

=== Playable characters ===
Rizumu Amamiya is the main player character, whereas Kanon Todo and Serena Jonouchi were unlockable characters once the player reaches Bronze and Gold rank respectively. The series' guide is named Mega-nee Akai (赤井 めが姉ぇ, Akai Mega-nee; Voiced by: Kanae Itō), who is in charge of helping the player dress up and provide information about clothing. Hibiki and Wataru, members of the group Callings, appear as non-playable characters during the story mode in Pretty Rhythm: Mini Skirt.

Character	Mini Skirt (Note: Mini Skirt, Aurora Dream, and Dear My Future's updates are counted as "seasons" and are cumulative. Seasons 1-3 take place in Mini Skirt, Seasons 4-8 take place in Aurora Dream, and Seasons 9-11 take place in Dear My Future.) (2010-2011)	Aurora Dream (2011-2012)	Dear My Future (2012-2013)	My Deco Rainbow Wedding (2013)	Rainbow Live (Note: Rainbow Live and Rainbow Live Duo's updates are counted as "sessions" and are cumulative. Sessions 1-2 take place in Rainbow Live and Session 3-4 takes place in Rainbow Live Duo.) (2013-2014)	Rainbow Live Duo (2013-2014)	Rainbow Live: Kirakira My Design (2013)	All Star Legend Coord Edition (2014)	PriPara de Tsukaeru Oshare Item 1450! (2015)
Rizumu Amamiya	Yes	Yes	Yes	Yes	Yes	Yes	Yes	Yes	Yes
Kanon Tōdō	Yes	Yes	Yes	Yes	Yes	Yes	Yes	Yes	Yes
Serena Jōnouchi	Yes	Yes	Yes	Yes	Yes	Yes	Yes	Yes	Yes
Haruu (Note: Playable in Season 2 (Fall Collection) only, which took place between October 14, 2011 and January 20, 2012.)	Season 2	No	No	No	No	No	No	No	No
Miyumiyu	Season 2	No	No	No	No	No	No	No	No
Nan-chan	Season 2	No	No	No	No	No	No	No	No
Aira Harune	No	Yes	Yes	Yes	Yes	Yes	Yes	Yes	Yes
Mion Takamine	No	Season 7-8 (Note: Playable in Season 7 (Prism Remake Edition) and Season 8 (Prism Queen Edition).)	Yes	Yes	Yes	Yes	Yes	Yes	Yes
Kaname Chris	No	No	Yes	Yes	Yes	Yes	Yes	Yes	Yes
Mia Ageha	No	No	Yes	Yes	Yes	Yes	Yes	Yes	Yes
Reina Miyama	No	No	Yes	Yes	Yes	Yes	Yes	Yes	Yes
Karin Shijimi	No	No	Yes	Yes	Yes	Yes	Yes	Yes	Yes
Ayami Oruri	No	No	Yes	Yes	Yes	Yes	Yes	Yes	Yes
Hye-in	No	No	Season 10-11 (Note: Playable in Season 10 (Pretty Debut Edition) and Season 11 (Dear My Future Shuffle Edition).)	Yes	Yes	Yes	Yes	Yes	Yes
So-min	No	No	Season 10-11	Yes	Yes	Yes	Yes	Yes	Yes
Shi-yoon	No	No	Season 10-11	Yes	Yes	Yes	Yes	Yes	Yes
Chae-kyung	No	No	Season 10-11	Yes	Yes	Yes	Yes	Yes	Yes
Jae-eun	No	No	Season 10-11	Yes	Yes	Yes	Yes	Yes	Yes
Rinne	No	No	No	Yes	Yes	Yes	Yes	Yes	Yes
Naru Ayase	No	No	No	No	Yes	Yes	Yes	Yes	Yes
Ann Fukuhara	No	No	No	No	Yes	Yes	Yes	Yes	Yes
Ito Suzuno	No	No	No	No	Yes	Yes	Yes	Yes	Yes
Bell Renjoji	No	No	No	No	Session 2 (Note: Playable in Session 2 (All Rare! Ki-ra-me-ki Days Edition).)	Yes	Yes	Yes	Yes
Otoha Takanashi	No	No	No	No	Session 2	Yes	Yes	Yes	Yes
Wakana Morizono	No	No	No	No	Session 2	Yes	Yes	Yes	Yes
June Amou	No	No	No	No	No	Yes	Yes	Yes	Yes
Cosmo Hojo	No	No	No	No	No	No	Yes	No	Yes
Laala Maanaka	No	No	No	No	No	No	No	No	Yes
Hiro Hayami	No	No	No	No	No	No	No	No	Yes

=== Playable songs ===
Song	Artist	Notes
"One Way Crush My Heart" (かたおもいマイハート)	Kanae Ito	
"Dance (Mahō no Groove)" (D@nce 〜まほうのグルーヴ〜)	Kanae Ito	
"Whoppin' Poppin' Summer!" (とびっきり! ポップン☆サマー!)	Kanae Ito	
"Can't Wait for After School Rock!" (まちきれない! アフタースクールRock!)	Kanae Ito	
"Lightly Row" (ちょうちょう) (Prism Mix)	Kanae Ito	
"Mini Skirt no Yōsei" (ミニスカートのようせい)	Mini Skirt	Available on the season 2-6 updates only
"Step! Step! Step!"	Kanae Ito	Available beginning the season 2 update
"Cozy Heart in Powderly Snow" (フワフワスノーであったかハート♥)	Kanae Ito	Available beginning December 17, 2010
"Dreamin' Boys & Girls"	Kanae Ito	Available beginning the season 2 update
"You May Dream"	Lisp	Available beginning the season 4 update
"Original (My Only Shiny Fashion)" (Original 〜私だけのキラキラファッション〜)	Kanae Ito	Available beginning the season 4 update
"Summer Night Evolution!" (サマーナイトEvolution!)	Kanae Ito	Available beginning July 16, 2011 (season 4)
"My Heart's Fiery!" (めらめらハートがあつくなる)	Lisp	Available beginning the season 4 update
"Catch My Heart 1000%" (1000%キュンキュンさせてよ♥)	Lisp	Available beginning the season 7 update
"Switch On My Heart"	Mion Takamine (CV: Azusa Kataoka)	Available beginning the season 7 update
"Hop! Step! Jump!"	Lisp	Available beginning January 19, 2012 (season 7)
"Dear My Future" (Dear My Future 〜未来の自分へ〜)	Prizmmy	Available beginning the season 9 update
"Are You Ready?"	Satomi Akesaka	Available beginning the season 9 update
"Check it Love" (チェキ☆ラブ)	Puretty	Available beginning the season 10 update
"My Heart-Puzzle (Love Everyday)" (オトメパズル 〜恋するEVERYDAY〜)	Satomi Akesaka	Available beginning the season 11 update
"Boy Meets Girl"	Prizmmy	Available beginning the session 1 update
"Shooting Star"	Satomi Akesaka	Available beginning the session 1 update
"EZ Do Dance"	Prizmmy	Available beginning the session 2 update
"Free Dreamin'"	Satomi Akesaka	Available beginning the session 2 update
"Crazy Gonna Crazy"	Prizmmy	Available beginning the session 3 update
"Rainy Day Happy!" (どしゃぶりHAPPY!)	Happy RAIN (CV: Emiri Kato, Yu Serizawa, Mikako Komatsu)	Available beginning the session 3 update
"Pump it Up!" (パンピナッ!)	Prizmmy	Available beginning the session 3 update; temporarily removed during the session 4 update and reinstated during the session 5 update
"Exciting Days" (と・き・め・きDays)	Satomi Akesaka	Available beginning the session 3 update
"Little Wing & Beautiful Pride"	Naru Ayase and Bell Renjoji (CV: Emiri Kato and Haruka Tomatsu)	Available beginning the session 4 update
"StarLight HeartBeat"	Satomi Akesaka	Available beginning the session 4 update
"Butterfly Effect" (バタフライ・エフェクト)	Prizmmy	Available beginning the session 5 update
"Gift"	Rinne (CV: Ayane Sakura)	Available beginning the session 5 update

== Spin-offs ==
=== PriPara ===
After Pretty Rhythm ended support in July 2014, it was replaced by the series' successor, PriPara. PriPara was first launched in arcades on July 10, 2014. The franchise introduced PriPara character Laala Manaka through Pretty Rhythm: All Star Selection. A second arcade game, Idol Time PriPara, was launched on April 1, 2017, to coincide with the animated adaptation of the same name. Three years after the conclusion of Idol Time PriPara, a third series titled Idol Land PriPara was announced for a Q2 2021 release, released as a mobile app with an accompanying anime series. Idol Land PriPara was delayed until Q3 2023.

=== King of Prism ===
King of Prism is a film series focusing on the male characters of Pretty Rhythm: Rainbow Live, targeting an older female demographic. The 2016 film King of Prism by Pretty Rhythm grossed ¥250 million in two months at the Japanese box office, where it eventually grossed ¥800 million ($7,353,421) by the end of its run. The 2017 film King of Prism: Pride the Hero grossed over ¥600 million ($5.35 million) at the Japanese box office. In 2019, King of Prism: Shiny Seven Stars was released as a 4-part film series from March 2 to May 4 and was also broadcast for the Spring 2019 anime season; the theatrical release of all six films had a consecutive box office gross of ¥320 million.

=== Pretty All Friends ===
In December 2017, to prepare for the franchise's 10th anniversary, a project titled Pretty All Friends was launched. In 2018, a merchandise line was launched.

In August 2018, Icrea attempted to launch a line of body pillow covers featuring the lead female characters in swimsuits and posing suggestively for sale at Comic Market, as a collaboration with the Pretty All Friends merchandise line. They were met with criticism from Japanese and Korean fans for sexualizing characters from a children's show. Tatsunoko Productions responded by making the products for purchase on Internet only before cancelling it altogether.

=== Kiratto Pri Chan ===
After PriPara and Idol Time PriPara ended services in 2018, it was succeeded by Kiratto Pri Chan. The game was launched in arcades on April 19, 2018.

=== Waccha PriMagi! ===
After Kiratto Pri Chan ended services in 2021, it was succeeded by Waccha PriMagi!. The game was launched in arcades on October 1, 2021.

=== AiPri ===
After Waccha PriMagi! ended services in 2024, it was succeeded by Himitsu no AiPri. The game was launched in arcades on April 4, 2024. A second arcade game, Onegai AiPri, was launched in arcades on April 2, 2026.

== Manga ==
A manga adaptation of Pretty Rhythm: Mini Skirt, titled Pretty Rhythm, was written and illustrated by Mari Asabuki, focusing on playable characters Rizumu, Serena, and Kanon, members of the group Asterism. It was serialized in Ribon from July 3, 2010, to 2012 and later compiled into tankoban volumes by Shueisha under the Ribon Mascot Comics imprint. The titles were released on digital platforms on May 22, 2013.

In addition to Asabuki's adaptation, Pretty Rhythm: Aurora Dream ran concurrently in Ciao from 2011 to 2012. Dear My Future, Rainbow Live, and All Star Selection also received manga adaptations in Pucchigumi.

1. Pretty Rhythm (2010-2012)
2. Pretty Rhythm: Aurora Dream (2011-2012)
3. Pretty Rhythm: Dear My Future (2012-2013)
4. Pretty Rhythm: Rainbow Live (2013-2014)
5. Pretty Rhythm: All Star Selection (2014)
6. PriPara (2014)
7. Idol Time PriPara (2017-2018)
8. Kiratto Pri Chan (2018-2021)
9. Waccha PriMagi! (2021-2022)

== Anime ==
Due to the popularity of Pretty Rhythm: Mini Skirt, in 2011, Takara Tomy partnered with South Korean toy company Sonokong to produce up to five anime series, projecting for ¥5.5 billion by the end of March 2012. Production costs estimated to about ¥7−8 billion. The series is animated by Tatsunoko Productions and published by Avex Pictures, with all shows broadcasting on TV Tokyo.

A live-action variety show segment called "Pretty Rhythm Studio" appeared at the end of every episode and was centered on Prism Mates, a group of tween trainees from Avex Dance Master consisting of Mia Kusakabe, Reina Kubo, and Karin Takahashi, chronicling their journey to debut. Near the end of Pretty Rhythm: Aurora Dream, the girls debuted in the group Prizmmy along with Ayami Sema, the winner of the Pretty Rhythm Award at the Kiratto Entertainment Challenge Contest 2011 Summer. During Dear My Future, a new group of trainees appeared as the Prism Mates and participated in the segments along with Prizmmy. By Rainbow Live, the segment was retitled "Pretty Rhythm Club."

From 2011 to 2024, Tatsunoko Productions initially produced much of the franchise's anime series, with DongWoo A&E co-animating them since 2012. As of 2026, OLM and DongWoo A&E are currently producing the franchise's anime series starting with Himitsu no AiPri in 2024.

=== Television series ===
No.	Title	Run	Episodes	Network	Source
1	Pretty Rhythm: Aurora Dream	April 9, 2011 – March 31, 2012	51	TX Network and TV Tokyo	
2	Pretty Rhythm: Dear My Future	April 7, 2012 – March 30, 2013	51	TX Network and TV Tokyo	
3	Pretty Rhythm: Rainbow Live	April 6, 2013 – March 29, 2014	51	TX Network and TV Tokyo	
SP	Pretty Rhythm: All Star Selection	April 5 – June 14, 2014	11	TX Network and TV Tokyo	
4	PriPara	July 5, 2014 – March 28, 2017	140	TX Network and TV Tokyo	
5	Idol Time PriPara	April 4, 2017 – March 27, 2018	51	TX Network and TV Tokyo	
6	Kiratto Pri Chan	April 8, 2018 – May 30, 2021	153	TX Network and TV Tokyo	
SP	Pretty All Friends Selection	June 6 – September 19, 2021	16	TX Network and TV Tokyo	
7	Waccha PriMagi!	October 3, 2021 – October 9, 2022	51	TX Network and TV Tokyo	
8	Himitsu no AiPri	April 7, 2024 – March 29, 2026	102	TX Network and TV Tokyo	
9	Onegai AiPri	April 5, 2026 – present		TX Network and TV Tokyo	

=== Films ===
1. Pretty Rhythm: All Star Selection: Prism Show Best Ten (2014)
2. PriPara: Minna Atsumare! Prism Tours (2015)
3. Tobidasu PriPara Minna de Mezase! Idol Grand Prix (2015)
4. King of Prism by Pretty Rhythm (2016)
5. PriPara Minna no Akogare Let's Go PriPari (2016)
6. PriPara Minna de Kagayake! Kirarin Star Live! (2017)
7. King of Prism: Pride the Hero (2017)
8. PriPara & Kiratto Pri Chan: KiraKira Memorial Live (2018)
9. King of Prism: Shiny Seven Stars (2019)
10. King of Prism All Stars Prism Show Best Ten (2020)
11. King of Prism: Dramatic Prism 1 (2024)
12. King of Prism: Your Endless Call Minna Kirameki! Prism☆Tours (2025)
13. Aikatsu! x PriPara: The Movie – Miraculous Meeting (2025)
14. Himitsu no AiPri: Mankai Buzzlume Live! (2026)

=== Web series ===
No.	Title	Run	Episodes	Source
EX	Idol Land PriPara	August 18, 2021 – April 24, 2024	12	

== Merchandise ==
=== Prism Stone ===
Prism Stone, a brand-name store featured in all series, was launched to coincide with Pretty Rhythm: Aurora Dream as a tie-in to the franchise. Its flagship store opened at the Yokohama Landmark Tower in April 2011, where Aurora Dream is set. Since then, several stores have been opened up nationwide in Japan. Aside from selling character goods, Prism Stone also sells a junior apparel line in "lovely" and "pop" designs. In 2014, Prism Stone released a collaboration clothing line with DreamV. The store also carried clothing from junior apparel brands Roni and EarthMagic, who have released collaboration Prism Stones for the arcade games in the past.

On March 30, 2012, the Pretty Rhythm franchise held an event titled Pretty Girls Dream Challenge 2012 in Yokohama, where 1,274 child models appeared on the catwalk. The event previously set the Guinness World Record for having the most models modeling on the catwalk at an event.

As a tie-in to Pretty Rhythm: Rainbow Live, a store was opened up in Harajuku in 2013, where Rainbow Live is set. It became the Pretty Series' main store after their flagship store in Yokohama closed in 2016.

=== Dear Crown ===
In 2012, along with a Prism Stone shop launched at Odaiba Venus Fort, Dear Crown, a second apparel shop, launched its flagship store at the same location as a tie-in to Pretty Rhythm: Dear My Future. Dear Crown was described as a sister apparel brand and counterpart to Prism Stone, featuring junior clothing in "cool" and "sexy" designs. In the anime series, the shop was represented by the main characters' rivals, such as Puretty, Bell Rose, and June. Dear Crown closed down in 2014 following the end of Pretty Rhythm: Rainbow Live, but it reopened in 2015 when the brand was introduced in PriPara. In 2016, Dear Crown closed again, with all products being now distributed through Prism Stone.

In February 2013, plans for both Prism Stone and Dear Crown shops to open in South Korea were announced as a tie-in to Pretty Rhythm: Dear My Future airing in the country, but they were ultimately dropped.

== Reception ==
Pretty Rhythm: Mini Skirt was popular among girls between 8–10 years old, with over 2,000 units available in arcades in 2011. By 2012, Prism Stone had earned ¥65 million in merchandise sales.
