= Cheer screening =

Type of film screening associated with Japan

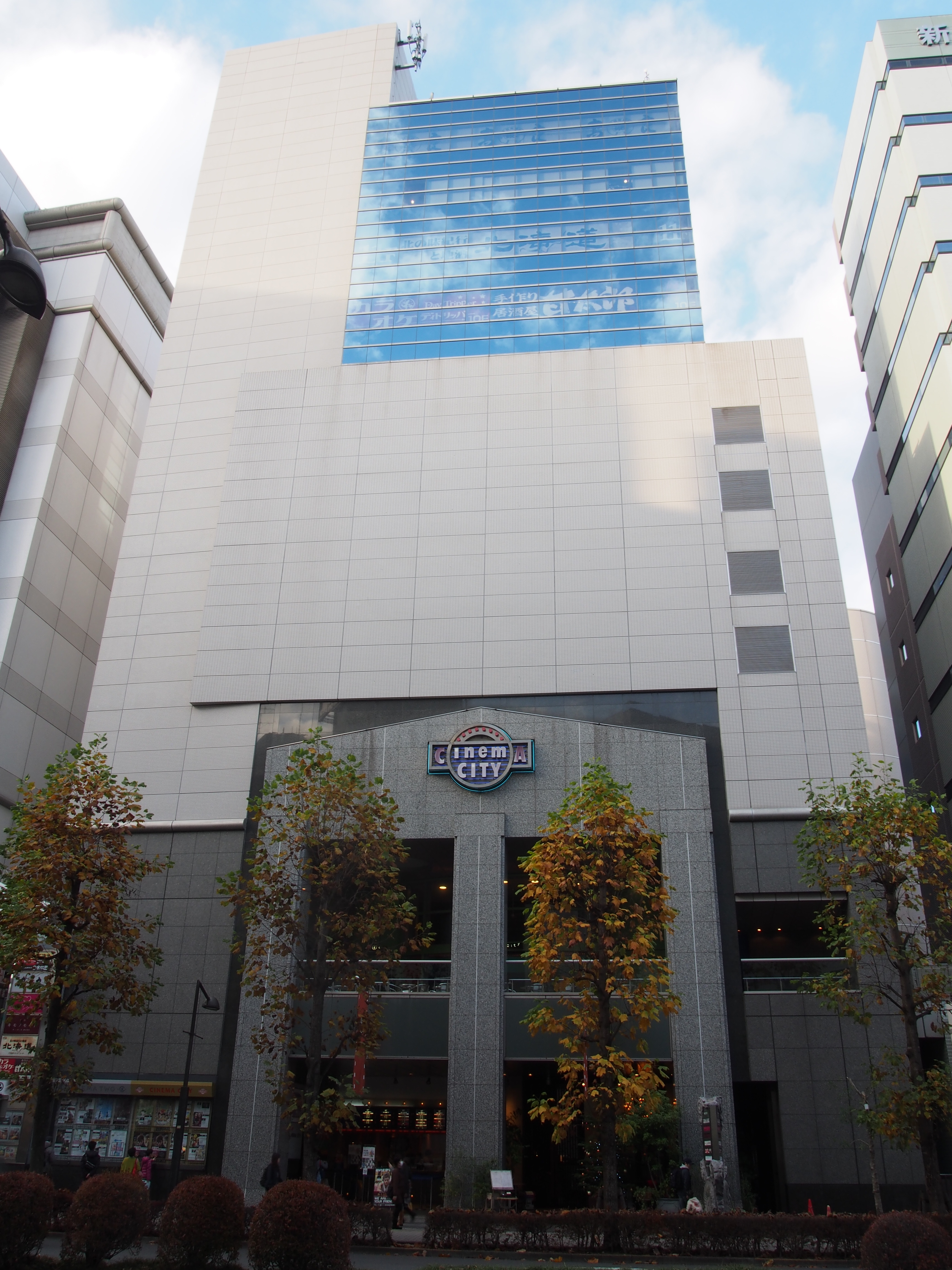
Cinema City in Tokyo, one of the first movie theaters to host cheer screenings

A cheer screening (Japanese: 応援上映, Hepburn: ouen jōei) is a type of film screening associated with Japanese cinema that encourages audience participation through cheering, typically in the form of applause, singing, and the shouting of responses to statements made by characters. Other terms used to describe this category of screening include cheering screening (チアリング上映, chiaringu jōei), vocal screening (発声型上映, hassei-gata jōei), screaming screening (絶叫上映, zekkyō jōei) and voice screening (声出し上映, koedashi jōei). When applied to Indian films, it is often called a masala screening (マサラ上映, masara jōei).

While participatory film screenings have an international history and context (most famously in midnight movie screenings of the 1975 film The Rocky Horror Picture Show), "cheer screenings" as a category gained particular popularity in Japan beginning in the early- to mid-2010s. While cheer screenings are most commonly associated with anime films, they have been held for anime and non-anime films that are both Japanese and non-Japanese in origin.

== Characteristics ==
Cheer screenings invite audience participation through shouting, applause, and the yelling of responses to statements made by characters. Other activities common at cheer screenings include cosplay, repetition of lines of dialogue, singing along to songs and musical numbers, and the use of glow sticks to perform wotagei (a form of coordinated cheering common at Japanese idol concerts). Cheer screenings contrast starkly with typical film screenings in Japan during which absolute silence is the norm.

== History ==
=== In Japan ===
In Japan, cheer screenings were conceived in the late 2000s as a response to the proliferation of streaming media on personal devices, which has resulted in a decline in movie theater attendance. In 2009, Cinema City in Tokyo screened the concert film Michael Jackson's This Is It as a "live-style screening" (ライブスタイル上映) that encouraged the audience to stand and cheer, as they would in an actual live concert performance. In 2011, a "screaming night" screening was held for the anime film Sengoku Basara: The Last Party, and in 2016, cheering screenings were held for the live action film High&Low The Movie.

Cheer screenings were widely publicized following the release of the 2016 anime film King of Prism by Pretty Rhythm. The film was specifically designed for the purpose of inviting audience participation through cheering, and features pauses in dialogue to allow for cheering and shouted responses by the audience. Cheering screenings for films, particularly anime films, proliferated in response to the success of King of Prism by Pretty Rhythm.

As Japanese movie theaters that had been closed in 2020 as a result of the COVID-19 pandemic gradually re-opened, cheer screenings were replaced with screenings where text messages from audience members were superimposed on the screen, a format similar to "bullet comments" (danmaku) common on video sharing websites such as Bilibili. Other cheer screenings were held on Zoom, which allowed viewers to be able to see the state of the audience and cheer without loudness concerns.

=== Outside of Japan ===
The 1975 film The Rocky Horror Picture Show has a long-established history of screenings that invite audience participation through the use of props, the shouting of lines, and the singing of songs. Cheer screenings can be seen as roughly analogous to western musical films that receive limited sing-along theatrical releases, such as Mamma Mia! in 2008 and Frozen in 2014.

Cheer screenings for Japanese films are occasionally held outside of Japan. In 2019, American film distributor GKIDS held an official cheer screening for the anime film Promare in Fort Worth, Texas, a film that also held cheer screenings in Japan.

== Impact and analysis ==
Cheer screenings have been cited as an example of a shift in consumer tastes towards participatory and experience-based entertainment, allowing audiences to enjoy a form of active media consumption in a typically passive environment. They have been noted as positively contributing to box office revenue; cheer screenings often become popular though word of mouth on social media, and enthusiastic fans will often attend multiple cheer screenings for the same film. The format is generally regarded as ill-suited for individuals who wish to concentrate on the film or avoid spoilers; consequently, cheer screenings are typically marketed towards individuals who have already seen the film in question.

The proliferation of cheer screenings has occasionally lagged behind public awareness of their existence; reports emerged of disgruntled individuals unwittingly purchasing tickets to cheer screenings of the 2019 live-action film Avengers: Endgame, while a cheer screening of the 2015 anime film Love Live! The School Idol Movie was cancelled after being deemed a nuisance.

== See also ==
- Cinema etiquette
- Interactive film
- Interactive cinema
- Masala screening (in Japanese), an audience participation format for Indian films screened in Japan
