= Snow & Ink =

Japanese manga series

- First tankōbon volume cover

雪と墨 (Yuki to Sumi)
- Genre: Drama; Historical; Romance
- Manga
- Written by: Miyuki Unohana
- Published by: Kodansha
- English publisher: NA: Kodansha USA
- Imprint: Young Magazine KC
- Magazine: Comic Days
- Original run: September 27, 2022 – present
- Volumes: 10

Snow & Ink (雪と墨, Yuki to Sumi) is a Japanese manga series written and illustrated by Miyuki Unohana. It began publication as webcomic on the author's Twitter account in December 2021. It later began serialization on Kodansha's Comic Days website in September 2022.

== Plot ==
Neneo has been sentenced to death after being charged with the mass murder of his village. As he awaits his fate, Neneo is bought by a mysterious wealthy heiress named Freya, who is also an outcast. She acquires Neneo's services in order guide her in her exile to the North. As the two go on their journey they start to empathize with each other and eventually develop feelings for each other.

== Media ==
=== Manga ===
Written and illustrated by Miyuki Unohana, Snow & Ink began publication on the author's Twitter account on December 26, 2021. It later began serialization on Kodansha's Comic Days website on September 27, 2022. Its chapters have been compiled into ten tankōbon volumes as of September 2026.

During their panel at Anime NYC 2023, Kodansha USA announced that they had licensed the series for English publication beginning in Q4 2024.

No.	Original release date	Original ISBN	North American release date	North American ISBN
1	January 19, 2023	978-4-06-530367-2	November 5, 2024	979-8-88-877216-4
1. "Border Train"; 2. "Sound Sleep"; 3. "Joined Leaves"; 4. "In the Shadow"; 5. "Yew Berries"
2	June 20, 2023	978-4-06-532055-6	February 4, 2025	979-8-88-877217-1
6. "White Wind"; 7. "Vanish Into Oblivion"; 8. "After the Snow"; 9. "Sealed Chapter"; 10. "The Brook"
3	October 19, 2023	978-4-06-533400-3	May 6, 2025	979-8-88-877318-5
11. "Ravel"; 12. "How We Live"; 13. "Scar"; 14. "Lofty Ambitions"; 15. "Igniter"
4	February 20, 2024	978-4-06-534618-1	September 30, 2025	979-8-88-877337-6
16. "Amendment"; 17. "All Evidence"; 18. "The Fuse"; 19. "Dual Contracts"; 20. "Freesia"
5	June 19, 2024	978-4-06-535923-5	December 23, 2025	979-8-88-877456-4
21. "A Leisurely Conversation"; 22. "Joined"; 23. "Cul-de-sac"; 24. "Refrain"; 25. "Killing the Skylark"
6	October 18, 2024	978-4-06-537305-7	September 15, 2026	979-8-88-877529-5
26. "Engram"; 27. "Pining"; 28. "Frenemies"; 29. "Cheshire Moon"; Short story: "A Messenger from Hell Is Swayed by the Moon"
7	March 18, 2025	978-4-06-538926-3	December 8, 2026	979-8-88-877658-2
8	September 19, 2025	978-4-06-540981-7	March 9, 2027	979-8-88-877903-3
9	March 18, 2026	978-4-06-542919-8	June 1, 2027	979-8-90-074123-9
10	September 17, 2026	978-4-06-544833-5	August 10, 2027	979-8-90-074360-8

=== Other ===
In commemoration of the release of the second volume on June 20, 2023, a commercial with narration by Toshiki Masuda was uploaded to the Weekly Young Magazine YouTube channel.
