= Risa Shimizu =

Risa Shimizu may refer to:

- Risa Shimizu (actress) (清水 理沙, born 1988), Japanese actress and voice actress
- Risa Shimizu (footballer) (清水 梨紗, born 1996), Japanese football player
