= AVAM (group) =

Japanese idol girl group

- Origin: Japan
- Genre: J-pop
- Years active: 2021–present
- Label: Movic
- Members: Ohara Otoha; Kikyou Hanaka; Takanashi Ami; Himemiya Yuka; Saiki Nanami; Shinonome Sora; Tsugumi Noa
- Website: avam-fc.com

AVAM (Japanese: アベアム, Hepburn: Abeamu) is a Japanese idol girl group originally formed in 2021 as MiKiOdA Idol Project.

== History ==
The group was formed by YouTuber Mikki under the name MiKiOdA Idol Project in 2021. Out of 15,000 submitted applications, seven people were selected as members: Ohara Otoha, Kikyou Hanaka, Takanashi Ami, Himemiya Yuka, Saiki Nanami, Shinonome Sora, and Tsugumi Noa.

The first iteration of the group ended activities on December 5, 2022, following Mikki's departure from the role of the producer. They had a re-debut with the same line-up but under the new name AVAM on April 4, 2023—a year and a half after their original formation. The new name was coined from the Latin word "ave" and from the Japanese spelling of the word "moratorium" (モラトリアム, moratoiamu).

AVAM's single "Sugary Story" (シュガリー・ストーリー), released in 2025, peaked at 27th place on the Oricon Singles Chart and was used as an opening theme for the anime Pass the Monster Meat, Milady!.

== Members ==
- Ohara Otoha (大原乙葉)
- Kikyou Hanaka (桔梗花香)
- Takanashi Ami (小鳥遊あみ)
- Himemiya Yuka (姫宮ゆか)
- Saiki Nanami (佐伯七海)
- Shinonome Sora (東雲青空)
- Tsugumi Noa (月深乃絢)

== Discography ==
EPs

- "Land of Mirrors" (2024)
- "Devil Up!" (2025)
