= B-Project =

2015 virtual idols role playing game

- B-PROJECT～Kodō＊Ambitious～ Promotional Poster
- Genre: Music
- Created by: MAGES; Chiyomaru Shikura
- Anime television series

B-PROJECT～Kodō＊Ambitious～
- Directed by: Eiji Suganuma
- Produced by: Takanori Nishikawa
- Written by: Deko Akao; MAGES
- Music by: Masato Nakayama
- Studio: A-1 Pictures
- Original network: Tokyo MX, GTV, GYT, BS11, ABC TV, CBC
- Original run: July 3, 2016 – September 25, 2016
- Episodes: 12
- Manga

B-PROJECT Mousou＊Scandal
- Written by: Morino Mizu
- Published by: Shogakukan
- Magazine: Cheese!
- Original run: May 24, 2016 – October 24, 2016
- Volumes: 1
- Video game

B-PROJECT Kaikan＊Everyday
- Developer: Criware
- Publisher: S & P Co. (formerly); MAGES
- Genre: Rhythm game
- Platform: iOS, Android
- Released: June 28, 2017
- Anime television series

B-PROJECT～Zecchō＊Emotion～
- Directed by: Makoto Moriwaki
- Produced by: Takanori Nishikawa
- Written by: Nozomu Ōshima; MAGES
- Music by: Ryosuke Nakanishi
- Studio: BN Pictures
- Original network: Tokyo MX, BS11, ABC TV, GTV, GYT
- Original run: January 11, 2019 – March 29, 2019
- Episodes: 12
- Anime television series

B-Project Passion*Love Call
- Directed by: Mutsumi Takeda
- Written by: Kira Konoka; MAGES
- Music by: Kōhei Miyahara
- Studio: Asahi Production
- Licensed by: Crunchyroll
- Original network: TV Tokyo, TV Osaka, AT-X, BS-NTV
- Original run: October 2, 2023 – December 18, 2023
- Episodes: 12

B-PROJECT is a Japanese cross-media project by MAGES. about a group of virtual idols that began in 2015. The project was first announced via Twitter on August 9, 2015, with the first production presentation and song previews being released on September 4, 2015, via nico live. As of January 2018 the project features an anime series, a manga adaptation, a rhythm game, a stage play, multiple music CDs, and a range of related merchandise.

== Overview ==
B-PROJECT follows four (initially three) Japanese idol groups that perform both as separate units and as a whole group. When the project first began the units were: Kitakore (キタコレ), THRIVE and MooNs, but on December 4, 2015, a fourth group known as KiLLER KiNG was added. The first single for the series, "Eikyuu Paradise (永久パラダイス)", was released digitally on September 11, 2015, alongside a promo video for the series and a teaser of a new single, "dreaming time", from THRIVE. It was later revealed that in addition to "dreaming time" from THRIVE, MooNs & Kitakore would also be releasing singles on November 25, 2015, "Glory Upper" and "Koiseyo Otome (恋セヨ乙女)" respectively.

Shortly after the introduction of KiLLER KiNG the next round of singles was announced on January 24, 2016. KiLLER KiNG's debut single would be "Kira Kira Smile (キラキラスマイル, Kira Kira Sumairu)", THRIVE's new single would be "Maybe Love", Kitakore's new single would be "Mysterious Kiss", and MooNs' new single would be "Brand New Star". Unlike the first round of singles the release dates were split into two batches; "Kira Kira Smile" and "Maybe Love" were released on March 23, 2016, while "Mysterious Kiss" and "Brand New Star" weren't released until April 6, 2016.

On September 9, 2016, it was announced that from December 2016 to March 2017 there would be six consecutive releases, with at least one single from each unit. The releases began on December 21, 2016, with the release of "Muteki*Dangerous (無敵＊デンジャラス, Muteki＊Denjarasu)" by B-Project as a whole, and "Hungry Wolf" by KiLLER KiNG. The next single, "Summer Mermaid" by MooNs, was released January 18, 2017. "Needle No.6" by THRIVE was released on February 22, 2017, while "Wonder☆Future (ワンダー☆フューチャー, Wandā☆Fūchā)" by Kitakore was set to be released on February 8, 2017, but was pushed back to March 15, 2017, the same release day as KiLLER KiNG's next single, Break it down, for unspecified reasons.

On March 19, 2017, alongside the announcement of the stage play production it was announced that B-Project would be releasing its first album. Two versions were released with different tracklists: S-Kyuu Paradise BLACK & S-Kyuu Paradise WHITE, both albums were released on July 19, 2017. The first song on both albums, "S-Kyuu Paradise (S級パラダイス)", is a new song sung by all 14 members, and each unit also released a new song: THRIVE and KiLLER KiNG on BLACK, and Kitakore and MooNs on WHITE. On June 9, 2017, the album covers were revealed and the titles for the four new songs were announced; "the one& only" by THRIVE, "Blooming Festa!" by KiLLER KiNG, "Jikū no Rasen (時空の螺旋)" by Kitakore, and "PRAY FOR..." by MooNs, along with previews for the THRIVE and Kitakore songs.

On September 30, 2017, at the second anniversary event, DARK in the HALLOWEEEEN, it was announced that the anime series would be receiving a second season at some point in the future, as well as announcing the fourth round of singles for each unit alongside new solo songs from all 14 members. On January 28, 2018, at the WINTER of FANTASIA event at Universal Studios Japan it was announced that there would be a new live show in July 2018, B-PROJECT SUMMER LIVE2018, as well as announcing the names and release dates of the fourth round of singles. The first singles released were "Phantom・of・Love (ファントム・オブ・ラブ, Fantomu・obu・Rabu)" by KiLLER KiNG and "Ultra-sensitive Destiny (超感デスティニー, Chōkan Desutinī)" by THRIVE which both released on March 18, 2018, followed by "GO AROUND" by MooNS which was released on May 16, 2018. "Crank In (クランクイン, Kurankuin)" by Kitakore and "Kaikan Everyday (快感エブリデイ, Kaikan Eburidei)" by B-Project which was released on July 16, 2018.

On November 28, 2018, a compilation album containing all the opening, ending and character songs from the first season of the anime, titled B-PROJECT～Kodō＊Ambitious～Compilation Album (B-PROJECT～鼓動＊アンビシャス～ コンピレーションアルバム, B-PROJECT～Kodō＊Anbishasu～Konpirēshon Arubamu) was released. On the same day, it was revealed the opening and ending themes for the second season of the anime were revealed, Zecchō Emotion (絶頂＊エモーション, Zecchō＊Emōshon) and Hikari to Kage no Toki Musubu (光と影の時結ぶ) respectively.

In total, the series has seen the release of 21 singles, and three albums, with another single slated for release in 2019. In addition to musical releases B-Project also features an anime produced by MAGES that ran during the Summer of 2016 for a total of 12 episodes, a manga written by Morino Mizu that ran for 6 chapters in late 2016 in the monthly magazine Cheese!, an ongoing web-radio series, a mobile musical game, and stage play. The anime was later released in 6 DVD & Blu-ray volumes; volumes 2–6 came packaged with 2 character songs each, 1 song for each unit member who made an appearance in the anime. The series has also seen a variety of special events, all of which have taken place in Japan and usually feature several of the voice actors from the series. These events have usually been to announce upcoming singles or projects, however two have been to celebrate the anniversary of the series. So far the series has seen the following special events: Happy Summer Eastar, KING of CASTE, Brilliant＊Party, LOVE & ART FAMILY MTG 2017, DARK in the HALLOWEEEEN, and WINTER of FANTASIA. For April Fools in 2017 there was an announcement on the official Twitter saying that the B in B-Project stood for baby, this was accompanied by a voting poll for who the fans most wanted to see become an adult again which lasted until April 9. The top 3 ranked characters, Kento Aizome, Goshi Kaneshiro, and Ryuji Korekuni, had limited edition life-sized body pillow covers made as a result of the voting poll. For 2018 April Fools the official Twitter revealed a continuation of last year's Baby-Project, known as Kids-Project, which showed the characters as pre-school children.

== Characters ==
=== Idol Groups and Members ===
==== MooNs ====
Hikaru Osari (王茶利 暉, Osari Hikaru)
Voiced by: Showtaro Morikubo
Portrayed by: Tatsuki Jōnin
The "eye candy" of the idol group, MooNs. In episode 7, it is revealed that Hikaru has an incurable disease. He has had it since before the auditions for B-Pro. It is also known that Nome has known about this when they met at the auditions which causes him to have a protective personality when it comes to Hikaru. His representative animal is a monkey. He was portrayed by Tatsuki Jonin (上仁 樹, Jōnin Tatsuki) in the first stage play, but was replaced by Hinata Matsumoto (松本ひなた, Matsumoto Hinata) in the REMiX play.
Tatsuhiro Nome (野目 龍広, Nome Tatsuhiro)
Voiced by: Genki Okawa
Portrayed by: Yūhei Chiwata
MooNs' "musclebound idiot" He and Hikaru share a deep friendship as they were shown to have met in the auditions for B-Pro and have been together since then. His representative animal is a bear. He is portrayed by Yuhei Chiwata (千綿勇平, Chiwata Yūhei) in the stage plays.
Kazuna Masunaga (増長 和南, Masunaga Kazuna)
Voiced by: Yūto Uemura
Portrayed by: Ryō Taguchi
He is called MooNs' Leader but doesn't agree to it but nevertheless accepts it for the time being. He is quite conscious of Tomohisa's actions. He also thinks that Tomohisa shines brighter that anyone while not considering his own brightness. The MooN's members are fond of him as seen in episode 3. His representative animal is a dog. He is portrayed by Ryo Taguchi (田口 涼, Taguchi Ryō) in the stage plays.
Momotaro Onzai (音済 百太郎, Onzai Momotaro)
Voiced by: Tetsuya Kakihara
Portrayed by: Tsubasa Kizu
MooNs' member. In episode 6, it is revealed that he can see avenging spirits in items. A very quiet cool type of person unlike Sekimura. He is close to Mikado. His representative animal is a hedgehog. He was portrayed by Tsubasa Kizu (木津つばさ, Kizu Tsubasa) in the first stage play, but was replaced by Seiya Konishi (小西成弥, Konishi Seiya) in the REMiX play.
Mikado Sekimura (釈村 帝人, Sekimura Mikado)
Voiced by: Toshiki Masuda
Portrayed by: Jin Hiramaki
He is the most energetic idol of the group. He is a really huge fan of Mamirin. He keeps a keychain of Mamirin on his bag, and keeps it as a good luck charm. He knows about Onzai's ability to see spirits and also is very close to him. His representative animal is a squirrel. He is portrayed by Jin Hiramaki (平牧 仁, Hiramaki Jin) in the stage plays.

==== Kitakore (キタコレ) ====
Ryūji Korekuni (是国 竜持, Korekuni Ryūji)
Voiced by: Daisuke Kishio
Portrayed by: Toman
A shy person who naturally can't confess his emotions easily. He is mostly seen with a candy in his mouth, mostly a lollipop. In the past, his mother would dress him up in girl clothes because he looked cute. His family is famous in the Entertainment business. He has been bullied due to people thinking he used his father's influence to get into B-Project. His representative animal is a cat. He is portrayed by Toman (とまん) in the stage plays.
Tomohisa Kitakado (北門 倫毘沙, Kitakado Tomohisa)
Voiced by: Daisuke Ono
Portrayed by: Yoshihide Sasaki
He is a confident and also a rich person since his family runs a hospital although his personality says otherwise. He is very close to Ryūji who is in the same idol group as him. They share a close friendship since they met at a party when they were younger. At the party, he met Ryuji who was wearing girl's clothes at that time which causes Tomohisa to think he was really a girl. He cares for Masunaga whom he had also known for a long time. He is known as the "Prince". His representative animal is a lion. He was portrayed by Yoshihide Sasaki (佐々木喜英, Sasaki Yoshihide) in the first stage play, but was replaced by Atsuchi Kimura (木村 敦, Kimura Atsushi) in the REMiX play.

==== THRIVE ====
Goshi Kaneshiro (金城 剛士, Kaneshiro Gōshi)
Voiced by: Toshiyuki Toyonaga
Portrayed by: Yuta Kishimoto
Goshi is considered the non-conformist of the group. He enjoys composing and prefers to maintain his more mature, rock-influenced image. He has a short temper and is often teased by his group members. His representative animal is a wolf. He is portrayed by Yuta Kishimoto (岸本勇太, Kishimoto Yūta) in the stage plays.
Kento Aizome (愛染 健十, Aizome Kento)
Voiced by: Kazuki Kato
Portrayed by: Reo Mitani
He is the playboy type in the group. He is mostly seen holding a mirror and fixing his bangs and according to Tsubasa, is always alert and pays attention to his surroundings. In episode 9, it was seen that he gets really annoyed when his bangs gets messed up. It was also revealed that he had a bit of a rough childhood causing him to have a play boy personality. His representative animal is a fox. He is portrayed by Tom Fujita (藤田 富, Fujita Tom) in the stage plays.
Yuta Ashu (阿修 悠太, Ashū Yūta)
Voiced by: Natsuki Hanae
Portrayed by: Tom Fujita
Yuta is the cute idol of the group. Has a cheerful, bright, and energetic personality but is also quite self-conscious about his nature. He is friendly with almost every member of B-project, and is closest to Kitakore's Ryuji outside of THRIVE. His representative animal is a sheep. He is portrayed by Reo Mitani (三谷怜央, Mitani Reo) in the stage plays.

==== KiLLER KiNG ====
Yuduki Teramitsu (寺光唯月, Teramitsu Yudzuki)
Voiced by: Koutaro Nishiyama
Portrayed by: Shōichirō Ōmi
One of the twins, much quieter than his brother and appears to be a bit shy. His representative animal is a rabbit. He is portrayed by Shochiro Omi (大海将一郎, Ōmi Shōchirō) in the stage plays.
Haruhi Teramitsu (寺光遙日, Teramitsu Haruhi)
Voiced by: Taku Yashiro
Portrayed by: Ryō Takizawa
One of the twins, the more extroverted and talkative of the two like his band-mate, Akane. His representative animal is a rabbit. He is portrayed by Ryo Takizawa (滝澤 諒, Takizawa Ryō) in the stage plays.
Akane Fudo (不動明謙, Fudo Akane)
Voiced by: Shōya Chiba
Portrayed by: Shunya Ōhira
Like Yuta of THRIVE, Akane seems to be the cute idol of his group and appears to be quite talkative and friendly. His representative animal is a pig. He is portrayed by Shunya Ohira (大平峻也, Ōhira Shunya) in the stage plays.
Miroku Shingari (殿 弥勒, Shingari Miroku)
Voiced by: Takuya Eguchi
Portrayed by: Shōta Kawakami
Like Yuzuki or Nome of MooNs, Miroku seems to be the quiet and stoic type of idol. His representative animal is a panther. He is portrayed by Shota Kawakami (川上将大, Kawakami Shōta) in the stage plays.

=== Anime-only characters ===
Tsubasa Sumisora (澄空 つばさ, Sumisora Tsubasa)
Voiced by: Hisako Kanemoto (B-Project: Kodō＊Ambitious) / Asami Seto (B-Project: Zecchō Emotion)
The main protagonist of the series. At the start of the anime, it was said she was suddenly hired to work at Gandara Music by the chairman of the company. Tsubasa appears shy when she first meets the boys, but slowly becomes more outgoing as the series goes on. She also has a very keen hearing ability, being able to distinguish any type of distinction in both music and nature. When asked how she came to develop such an ability, she replies that she was musically influenced by her father. She now works as the A&R of the all-boy group, B-Pro. It is later revealed in the second season of the anime that Tsubasa's father was a famous composer named Yu Saikai.
Sakurato Yashamaru (夜叉丸 朔太郎, Yashamaru Sakurato)
Voiced by: Kohsuke Toriumi
Yashamaru is the company director of Gandara Music and Tsubasa's boss. B-Pro is extremely close to him since he was the one who created their group. He also trains Tsubasa to become an A&R. However, it is later revealed in the final episode of the anime's first season that creating B-Pro and hiring Tsubasa was part of his revenge plot against Tsubasa's father, whom he claimed had "killed" his family. In the second season of the anime, he quits working at Gandara Music and is now an employee at another agency, Highedge Records. It is revealed that Yashamaru had a younger sister who was once an up-and-coming idol, but her career was hindered due to her frail health. She died ten years ago prior to the start of the series, due to the shock of not being able to sing a song made by Tsubasa's father, Yu Saikai. Yashamaru decided to avenge her death by destroying anyone who was associated with Saikai. However, because Saikai died twelve years ago prior to the start of the series, he decided to make Tsubasa, who was Saikai's daughter, suffer in her father's place.
Atsushi Daikoku (大黒 篤志, Daikoku Atsushi)
Voiced by: Kazuyuki Okitsu
He is the president of the public entertainment office, Daikoku Productions which he established alongside his younger brother Shūji. His entertainment office represents Kitakore and MooNs. He is also on good terms with Tsubasa and he assists her when she needs it most.
Shūji Daikoku (大黒 修二, Daikoku Shūji)
Voiced by: Daisuke Namikawa
He is the younger brother of Atsushi Daikoku. He established Daikoku Productions alongside Atsushi, but he soon left the company to establish his own public entertainment office, Brave Productions. His entertainment office represents THRIVE and KiLLER KiNG. Like Atsushi, Shūji is also on good terms with Tsubasa and he assists her when she needs it most.

== Media ==
=== Manga ===
On April 8, 2016, shortly after the announcement of the anime series it was revealed that a manga series known as "B-Project: Mousou＊Scandal (B-PROJECT 妄想＊スキャンダル, B-PROJECT Mousou＊Sukyandaru)" would begin serialization in the magazine "Cheese!" the following month. The series began on May 24, 2016, and concluded on October 24, 2016, after 6 chapters, the series focused largely on the units of THRIVE and KiLLER KNG.

=== Video games ===
On August 6, 2016, it was announced that in addition to the anime and manga the series had just begun development on a rhythm game app for smartphones known as B-PROJECT～Muteki＊Dangerous～ (B-PROJECT～無敵＊デンジャラス～, B-PROJECT～Muteki＊Denjarasu～). Pre-registration has opened on the game's website and will remain open until the game's release, with users receiving bonuses for collectively clearing certain "stages" of pre-registration (stages are determined by the number of people signed up so far), the most recent stage to be cleared was 700,000+ users. At the LOVE & ART FAMILY MTG 2017 event in March a small preview of the game and how to play it was available for attendees to play. The game involves putting on performances to B-Project songs with the characters you have obtained, it also has a story mode including some chapters in a visual novel game style. In a live broadcast on nicovideo on June 9, 2017, it was announced that the game would finally be released in the second half of June. It was then announced on June 27 via Twitter that the game would be released the next day, on June 28, 2017. Owing to an unexpected number of users, the game was largely in maintenance for its first week so that the servers could be upgraded to handle the increased amount of activity.

At the 2018 live, B-PROJECT SUMMER LIVE 2018 ETERNAL PACIFIC, it was announced that the game would be receiving a renewal including a major overhaul to the interface and certain features, including significant changes to the rhythm section of the game. Few details were initially released other than the fact it was slated for an early 2019 release, though later updates revealed that the game would receive a new name along with the renewal now being labelled B-PROJECT Kaikan＊Everyday (B-PROJECT 快感＊エブリディ, B-PROJECT Kaikan＊Eburidei). The renewal eventually went live on May 20, 2019, after several days of maintenance; to celebrate the release players received a weeks worth of free 10-card pulls in the games photo feature.

At the B-PROJECT Thrive Live 2020 -Music Drugger- event, a console game developed for the Nintendo Switch titled B-PROJECT Ryūsei*Fantasia (B-PROJECT Shooting Star*Fantasia) was announced. On July 1, 2021, it was announced that the game will be released in Japan on September 30, 2021, for Nintendo Switch, iOS, and Android.

=== Radio ===
The first release in the series was the web-radio show, premiering on September 7, 2015, on nicovideo and known as "B-Project Radio: Gandara Broadband". The radio series currently has 16 installments as of December, 2016, but also often hosts special announcements and messages, such as the special broadcasts done as part of the first anniversary and the announcement of special events such as KING of CASTE.

=== Stage play ===
On March 19, 2017, it was announced that the series would be seeing the release of a stage play called "B-PROJECT on STAGE『OVER the WAVE!』" beginning July 28, 2017, and ending on August 17, 2017. Along with the play's announcement the first round of casting was released with one character from each unit being revealed. A second run of the play, entitled OVER the WAVE! REMiX was announced on January 10, 2018, with most of the original cast returning to reprise their roles; Tomohisa, Momo, & Hikaru were recast due to scheduling conflicts with the original actors. The REMiX play ran from February 22, 2018, until March 3, 2018.

=== Anime ===
On March 26, 2016, at AnimeJapan MAGES. announced that B-PROJECT would be receiving an anime adaptation called B-PROJECT～Kodō＊Ambitious (B-PROJECT～鼓動＊アンビシャス～, B-PROJECT～Kodō＊Anbishasu～) in the Summer of 2016. The series began airing in Japan on July 3, 2016, and ran for a total of 12 episodes before concluding on September 25, 2016. The series focuses on the units of Kitakore, MooNs and THRIVE, with KiLLER KiNG only making a brief, non-voiced cameo in one episode, as well as featuring several unique characters that have not appeared in any other media for the series as of yet. The character designs were done by Toshie Kawamura, who previously worked on the character designs for Yes! PreCure 5 and Smile PreCure!. Series producer and songwriter Takanori Nishikawa also made a brief cameo in the fourth episode as fellow performer Nishiyama.

The opening theme is Kodō＊Ambitious (鼓動＊アンビシャス, Kodō＊Anbishasu) by B-Project while the first ending theme is Hoshi to Tsuki no Sentence (星と月のセンテンス) by Kitakore. The second ending theme is STARLIGHT by THRIVE. The third ending theme is Yumemiru Power (夢見るPOWER) by MooNs.

The story follows Tsubasa, a new hire in the A&R department of the major recording company Gandara Music. Tsubasa is immediately assigned to oversee the idol unit "B-PROJECT," which is made up of three idol groups: Kitakore, THRIVE, and MooNs. This is Tsubasa's first job, and she gets involved in various incidents and accidents as she deals with this group of young men who each have their own differing personalities.

A second season was announced at the 2017 DARK in the HALLOWEEEEN event. The series is titled B-PROJECT～Zecchō＊Emotion～ (B-PROJECT～絶頂＊エモーション～, B-PROJECT～Zecchō＊Emōshon～), and it premiered from January 11 to March 29, 2019. The second season will consist of new staff members, with Makoto Moriwaki replacing Eiji Suganuma as director, and Ryosuke Nakanashi replacing Masato Nakayama as music composer. Nozomu Ōshima and MAGES. will be in charge of series composition, and Yumiko Hara will handle character designs. Bandai Namco Pictures is credited for production. Returning staff members include Takanori Nishikawa as producer, and Chiyomaru Shikura, who is credited for planning and original work. The anime cast will also reprise their roles, with the exception of Hisako Kanemoto, who announced in May 2018 that she would be going on hiatus to study abroad until March 2019. She was replaced by Asami Seto who voiced Tsubasa Sumisora for the anime's second season.

The opening theme for the second season is Zecchō＊Emotion (絶頂＊エモーション, Zecchō＊Emōshon) while the ending theme for the second season is Hikari to Kage no Toki Musubu (光と影の時結ぶ), performed by the anime's cast. Season two saw the introduction of the members of KiLLER KiNG to the anime's storyline, as they were absent from the first season (except for a minor cameo in a flashback episode).

A third season was announced at the B-PROJECT Thrive Live 2020 -Music Drugger- event. The third season, titled B-Project Passion*Love Call, features a returning cast and staff and is produced by Asahi Production. It aired from October 2 to December 18, 2023, on TV Tokyo and other networks. Crunchyroll licensed the series in English-speaking territories and Southeast Asia.

==== Season 1 ====
No.	Title	Insert song	Original release date
1	"Boys Meet Girl"	Hoshi to Tsuki no Sentence	July 3, 2016
After the boys singing their rehearsal song, they see someone from backstage, prompting them to rush up to greet that someone called Yashamaru upon performing their rehearsal. Yashamaru then introduces the girl standing by earlier on as Tsubasa Sumisora, saying that she will be B-Project's new A&R. Yashamaru then, receives a call and he leaves the boys to introduce themselves to Tsubasa. Yashamaru then returns and informs the boys that their debut at the festival was cancelled, much to everyone's dismay. Each of the groups proceeded with their own jobs for the day with Tsubasa accompanying Kitakore for their song recording as her first assignment. As they record the song, Kitakore are amazed when Tsubasa was able to point out the dissonance in the song and how and why they had been singing that way. At the end, Tomohisa suddenly sneaks a kiss on Tsubasa's cheek while she sleeps which startles and embarrasses Ryuji, and Tomohisa silently gestures him to keep it a secret between them.
2	"The Bad End isn't so bad" "BAD END mo warukunai" (Japanese: BAD ENDも悪くない)	Starlight	July 10, 2016
Since Kitakore's song turned out so well, Moona tells them that they also would sing a song just as good, causing them to receive a commercial deal. Tsubasa is then assigned to accompany THRIVE who will be doing a photoshoot for a page in the magazine called Kiss&Hug. During the photoshoot, Goshi refuses to act "cute" by wearing a cat ear headband which causes the editor-in-chief of the magazine to provoke him to the point where he dashes out of the studio. After learning that Yashamaru had been convincing the editor-in-chief to let THRIVE be included in the magazine, Tsubasa, Yuta and Kento chase him down and confront him. They return to the studio to continue the photoshoot and they end up having their photos taken with a cat. The photos are a success and THRIVE gets more than one page for the magazine. The episode ends with Yuta and Kento trying to get Goshi to perfect a cat pose.
3	"Let's go with Brilliant" "Brilliant de ikou☆" (Japanese: BRILLIANTで行こう☆)	Yumemiru Power	July 17, 2016
While Moons is fast asleep in the morning, Tsubasa receives a phone call from Yashamaru to confirm that Moons is on their way to the location for the CM shoot. Tsubasa attempts to explain about them sleeping, but Yashamaru hangs up on her. At the CM site, Tsubasa overhears some staff members belittling them behind the make-up bus. As the commercial rolls about, Moons makes curry as a competition between members, Nome and Hikaru versus Onzai and Sekimura, with Masunaga as judge. Upon filming the first few scenes, a monkey manages to catch Tsubasa off-guard when she was on the phone with Yashamaru. After chasing the monkey, the CM director changes the location of the commercial to the hot spring that they found.
4	"Break Out Star"	Hoshi to Tsuki no Sentence, Starlight, Yumemiru Power, Kodō Ambitious	July 24, 2016
Yashamaru is impatiently texting, calling and pacing Tsubasa's phone. When she finally notices, they all rush to the concert venue stage where they cause people to get angry. As the dance practice starts, the stage had many props around, making it hard to dance. When the B-Pro members start to argue, other bands of the same concert, as well as staff, start to look down on them. On the last song, Tsubasa barely manages to fix the costume in time. The rain lets up on the last song as well. Yashamaru praises the boys on a job well done, and a look at his phone shows that he told Tsubasa the wrong time. The episode ends in him buying Omi Beef steaks for the B-Pro members as punishment.
4.5	"Special Premium Episode"	N/A	July 31, 2016
A talk with Genki Okawa, Daisuke Kishio, Toshiyuki Toyonaga, Natsuki Hanae, Toshiki Masuda and Yuto Uemura.
5	"Back to the Baby"	Ashita wa, Kyō Yori Yume Miyō, Hoshi to Tsuki no Sentence	August 7, 2016
As B-Pro is takes a break after practicing to Kodou Ambitious, Ryuji is confronted by a stalking paparazzi who shows him a scandal page about his father. This causes Ryuji to lash out by running away from him, resulting him falling down the stairs and hitting his head, rendering him unconscious. Unbeknownst to them, Yuta and Tomohisa were listening. When Ryuji wakes up he has amnesia - only remembering his life when he was seven years old. Despite his condition, B-Pro attend their photoshoot, but Ryuji puts on a dress for the shoot. Ryuji later sees Tomohisa talking to Tsubasa, making him jealous and prompting him to run away from the studio. Tsubasa manages to catch up to him and she convinces him to return to the photoshoot, but the paparazzi man also shows up to make a scandal about Ryuji having amnesia. When the man tries to pursue him, Ryuji does not notice the traffic walking signal and as a truck is about to collide with him, Tomohisa jumps in to save him. Ryuji finally recovers his memories and they continue the shoot.
6	"Six Sense Blade"	magic JOKER	August 14, 2016
The episode starts with Tsubasa accompanying Mikado, Momotaro and Goshi to an audition for a samurai play. The play will be produced by Ryuji's father, Kenzo Matsukura who will also star in it. The boys practice sword-fighting for the play and one of the auditioners gets possessed by a spirit in the katana and Momotaro gets chosen to fight with him resulting him getting his hand struck by the katana. When Momotaro asks Kenzo why he didn't visit Ryuji at the hospital (Episode 5), Kenzo explains that both he and his son are now professionals, so work comes first before family and Ryuji already acknowledges this. When the actor who injured Momotaro gets the role of the main character, it's spirit possess the others, causing Mikado, Momotaro and Goshi to fight them off. Afterwards, Kenzo asks B-Pro if they would be the main roles together. All three agree as the show goes on.
7	"Bullet of the Heart" "Mune no BULLET" (Japanese: 胸のBULLET)	Arigatou no Harmony	August 21, 2016
The episode starts off with the filming of a popular lunch show, with Nome, Hikaru, Tomohisa, Kazuna, and Kento. They are separated into two groups, with Nome and Hikaru being the Mountain Team, while Tomohisa, Kazuna and Kento will be the Ocean Team. Before filming, Nome finds Hikaru panting. Hikaru tells Nome that he forgot his medicine but assures him that he would be fine for filming. At the end of the day, when they are discussing their shoot, Hikaru suddenly coughs up blood and is laid down to rest. It is then revealed that Hikaru has an incurable disease which he had before the first B-Pro audition. After figuring to find some godaiso (mugwort), Nome manages to find some on the side of the cliff, but falls down. As a search party for Nome is away, Hikaru finds Nome singing. After they all get back, the rest of B-Pro comes and surprises them. They reveal that Ryuji was contacted by Tomohisa to search for the medicine and they all pitched in. The episode ends with filming the rest of the episode where the Mountain Team surprises the Ocean Team with water jetpacks.
8	"Bye-bye Yesterday"	Color of Heart, Eikyū Paradise, Yumemiru Power	August 28, 2016
At the beach, B-Pro is being filmed to promote their first fanbook. It starts to rain and the sea becomes rough causing B-Pro's boat to get separated from the others. They wake up to find themselves on a deserted island. They try to contact Tsubasa using Kento's cell phone, but the call is cut short due to lack of connection. B-Pro then hears a mysterious rumble causing them to get a bit scared and they decide to look for shelter. They find a cave and split up to look for food and create fire. When Kazuna seemingly goes missing, Tomohisa searches for him and eventually finds him. Kazuna finally lets out his frustrations of being constantly outshined by Tomohisa, but Tomohisa convinces him that he has his own brightness and they rekindle their friendship. They bump into Yuta and Ryuji who tell them that they found a nice spot in the cave. The rest of B-Pro joins them and through a radio, they hear their songs played and they realize that Tsubasa had recommended their songs to the radio station. After listening to their songs, B-Pro decides to escape the island together. It is then revealed that the island was one of Tomohisa's family research facilities, after they discover the source of the mysterious rumble. The episode ends with Tsubasa greeting B-Pro who return safely from the island.
9	"A Cheating Playboy" "Kina PLAY BOY" (Japanese: 浮気なPLAY BOY)	Love in Secret x Sexy Night	September 4, 2016
The episode starts with THRIVE and Kitakore starring in a film; "The Barking Dogs", which is being directed by Sophie Vabelle, a French film director who is internationally famous. The star of the film was revealed to be Kento who was chosen by the director herself. While filming, Ryuji and Yuta pranked the other members as part of the bloopers. The next scene was to be shot at a big river, but they didn't have permission to do that. Kento being in favor of the director tries to convince her to let the situation drop but instead, the director replies something that puts Kento in shock as it reminded him of his traumatic past. The next day they shoot the river scene but because of what the director said to him, Kento ends up losing focus during the filming and he heads out after an argument with Yuta and Goshi. Tsubasa goes to Kento for company and to confront him about the shoot. Tsubasa tells him that he was not as alone as he thinks he is and this convinces Kento. Their last scene for the film proves Tsubasa's point which causes Kento's expression to soften. However, the last scene turned out to be B-Pro's prank to THRIVE. Seeing this, the director praises Kento's acting and reveals the real reason why she made him the star of her movie was to encourage him to show the true kindness and compassion behind his mask. In the end, Kento attempting to apologize to Yuta and Goshi but because he was too shy to say so, it ends up with him treating everyone for ramen.
10	"Birthday"	Eikyū Paradise	September 11, 2016
Tsubasa receives a call from Yashamaru who tells her to come to the agency, because he has an important announcement. Upon arrival, Yashamaru announces that B-Pro will perform at the Japan Dome for Christmas Eve. They begin rehearsing for the event and when Halloween approaches, Tsubasa buys B-Pro some Halloween-themed doughnuts as a treat, prompting B-Pro to remember that Yashamura's birthday is coming soon, so they decide to throw a surprise party for him. As they shop for food and decorations, Tsubasa learns from B-Pro that Yashamaru has always been there for them since he created B-Pro. While waiting for Yashamaru, some disasters happen, but after some encouragement from Tsubasa, they re-decorate the apartment, but it ends with Yashamaru not coming.
11	"Beyond You"	Run and Gun	September 18, 2016
The episode begins with B-Pro on a talk show about their upcoming Japan Dome concert. The next day, Tsubasa, Goshi, Ryuji, Momotaro and Nome go to the recording studio to record the centerpiece song for their concert. While recording, they notice that Tsubasa seems to be overworking herself. However, on their way back from a photoshoot, Tsubasa discovers that their centerpiece song has been taken by another idol group. With the concert just two weeks away, Tsubasa suddenly suggests that they make a new song. This motivates B-Pro and a new song and arrangement is prepared. B-Pro decide that they will write the lyrics to their new song and they use the theme "invincible". Tsubasa later visits MooNs apartment to deliver their schedule and stays a bit to discuss their new song. The next day, B-Pro show Tsubasa their lyrics for their song and she praises them. Then, Tsubasa receives a message from Yashamaru who tells them to turn on the TV. When they do, a shocking announcement is shown, B-Pro has been transferred to another agency called Highedge Records. Tsubasa tries to contact Yashamaru about this, but she is unable reach him.
12	"Boys be Ambitious!"	Eikyū Paradise, Muteki Dangerous, Kodō Ambitious	September 25, 2016
Continued from where the previous episode left off, Tsubasa still tries to contact Yashamaru, but he does not pick up. When Yashamaru finally calls her, he confirms the announcement of B-Pro being transferred to Highedge Records before telling her that he hates her and Gandara Music. Yashamaru then goes to inform B-Pro about the transfer and he convinces them to accept it. Even at the new agency, B-Pro is unfazed by how they are not allowed to contact Tsubasa, and Yashamaru lies to them that she quit. When Tsubasa manages to confront Yashamaru, he reveals to her that ten years ago, her father "killed" his family. Creating B-Pro, hiring her to work at Gandara Music, the cancellation of B-Pro's debut at the music festival, and the other incidents was all part of his revenge plot against her father. He also tells her that B-Pro has agreed to transfer and it will be getting a new A&R, claiming that B-Pro does not need her anymore. The next day, a guilt-ridden Tsubasa heads to the Japan Dome where the concert was supposed to take place and cries there, only to be interrupted when the stage lights turn on and B-Pro suddenly appear on stage. B-Pro reveals that it decided not to transfer, because the deal the agency offered them was not appealing in the end, and the group also wants her to continue working as their A&R. The episode ends with the boys performing in the Japan Dome.

==== Season 2 ====
No. overall	No. in season	Title	Insert song	Original release date
13	1	"BRAND NEW WORLD" "BRAND NEW WORLD" (Japanese: BRAND NEW WORLD)	Love Winner	January 11, 2019
The episode begins with B-Pro's live concert at the Japan Dome which becomes a success. The following day after the live concert is the new year, and things start to get busy. Gandara Music's reputation is restored after it is confirmed that B-Pro will not be transferring to Highedge Records. Tsubasa struggles to attend all of B-Pro's work sessions while still shaken by her confrontation with Yashamaru. However, B-Pro continues supporting her as their A&R, and they encourage Tsubasa to move forward. One evening, she receives a call from the president of Daikoku Productions, Atsushi Daikoku, who instructs her to bring B-Pro to Gandara Music, as there is an important announcement they need to hear. The next day, Tsubasa brings B-Pro to the agency as instructed, and upon arrival, they are introduced to another boy group called KiLLER KiNG. Tsubasa then announces to everyone that starting from today, KiLLER KiNG will be joining B-Pro as the fourth sub-unit - making B-Pro into a fourteen-member group - much to the boy's shock.
14	2	"DIE HARD" "DIE HARD" (Japanese: DIE HARD)	Juggler	January 18, 2019
The episode begins with Tsubasa attending her first meeting with KiLLER KiNG, to discuss a joint concert with THRIVE. It is to announce to the fans that KiLLER KiNG has officially joined B-Pro. KiLLER KiNG is excited about the collaboration and are determined to make it a success. Upon returning to the agency, Tsubasa assists her co-workers to clear Yashamaru's desk and she discovers a second photograph of Yashamaru with a girl when she accidentally drops his photo frame. When the song is ready, Tsubasa announces that Kento and Miroku will represent their respective groups as the double centers for the choreography. However, despite his seriousness and his dancing being perfect, the choreographer suddenly decides to replace Miroku with Haruhi as the center without an explanation. This stresses Miroku who becomes determined to convince the choreographer to change his mind, until he is approached by Tsubasa who encourages him to be more light-hearted. Taking her advice, Miroku rapidly improves and he is finally able to dance the center choreography with Kento, making the concert a success. While celebrating the concert's success with KiLLER KiNG and Tsubasa, the episode ends with THRIVE receiving a PDF file titled "Andy's Report" on their phones from Tomohisa.
15	3	"PARTY NIGHT" "PARTY NIGHT" (Japanese: PARTY NIGHT)	Love Winner	January 25, 2019
Tsubasa and B-Pro decide to throw a welcome party for KiLLER KiNG at MooNs's apartment. Everyone assists with the preparations and they are introduced to "Lucas", an electronic smart speaker who takes care of the electronics in MooNs's apartment by commands. KiLLER KiNG eventually arrives and the party goes well until "Lucas" malfunctions, causing a disruption with the electronics. Due to the malfunctions, everyone gets locked inside MooNs's apartment, followed by a blackout and a sudden increase in temperature which causes the room to become extremely hot. While Momotaro and Tsubasa desperately try to repair "Lucas", the heat causes THRIVE and Haruhi to panic. However, Haruhi unwittingly saves the day when he screams at "Lucas" to lower the temperature in English, which the speaker complies to. This causes Momotaro to realise that "Lucas" had somehow been switched to the English-language setting. The episode ends with Tsubasa, B-Pro and KiLLER KiNG continuing to celebrate the welcome party.
16	4	"TWO IS ONE" "TWO IS ONE" (Japanese: TWO IS ONE)	Aishū ￫ Serenāde	February 1, 2019
Kitakore are being filmed for a special documentary about their idolhood by Fanatical Continent. They then separate for their individual work; Tsubasa accompanies Ryuji to discuss a CM for a cosmetic brand while Tomohisa goes to attend a shoot for a romantic drama called 'Long Vacance' with Mikado and Kento. Ryuji becomes tense when he learns he is supposed to act sexy and mature for the CM. He hesitantly complies, resulting in the CM receiving mixed reviews. On the other hand, Tomohisa has problems of his own when he struggles with a confession scene. He keeps quiet about this from Ryuji, who later finds out from Kazuna. Before the filming, Tomohisa tries to get some advice from Tsubasa, but Ryuji interrupts and he questions him about his romantic life. This prompts Tomohisa to have a flashback of his first meeting with a girl whom he claimed looked like Ryuji, unaware that it was actually Ryuji dressed in girl's clothing. Using this memory, Tomohisa is finally able to act out the confession scene. Ryuji also makes his resolve by persuading the director to do a reshoot of the CM using his idea for the cosmetic brand which becomes a success. The episode ends with Yashamaru watching Kitakore's interview on TV. He appears proud of Kitakore until Tsubasa stumbles into the frame by accident. Upon seeing Tsubasa, Yashamaru is shocked to learn that she is still B-Pro's A&R. This causes him to start recollecting unpleasant memories of his past, and a vengeful look appears on his face.
17	5	"KICK OFF" "KICK OFF" (Japanese: KICK OFF)	YOLO ~Act Now~	February 8, 2019
The episode starts off with Tsubasa at a café with THRIVE, discussing about their new song. They are later joined by MooNs who are having a day off from work. Tsubasa soon dashes off to attend Kitakore's recording session, but she drops an envelope which Yuta retrieves. He quickly catches up to Tsubasa, but he accidentally discovers two VIP room tickets for a "Justice Hoover" concert in the envelope before returning it to her. When he regroups with THRIVE and MooNs, he reveals to them about the tickets in Tsubasa's possession, causing everyone to assume she is attending the concert with a date. When Kazuna suddenly mentions Tsubasa had said earlier that anyone who works hard would be rewarded, the boys become convinced she is planning to reward one of them with the tickets to see the concert with her. They decide to settle this with a futsal game with Kitakore joining them. B-Pro sends photos of their game through the group chat which is seen by Tsubasa who mistakenly believes they are fighting. After an intense game, Yuta manages to score a goal and the rest of B-Pro allow him to claim the "reward", only to be dismayed when Tsubasa reveals she was actually safe-keeping the tickets belonging to Atsushi Daikoku and his younger brother Shūji. The episode ends with Tomohisa and Kento meeting up at a restaurant with a man called "Andy", to discuss his investigation. Lastly, Kento asks Andy to examine a photograph of a female idol, who turns out to be none other than the girl whom Tsubasa saw in Yashamaru's photo.
18	6	"MOVING ON" "MOVING ON" (Japanese: MOVING ON)	STARTIN' SHINY FANTASY	February 15, 2019
While at work, Mikado is visited by his father's secretary who informs him that his father wants him to quit MooNs and return to the Sekimura family to study civil service. As it turns out, Mikado's father only allowed him to become an idol on the condition that he quits when he is told to do so. He keeps quiet about this from the other MooNs members, who later discover his resignation form in his room. They confront Mikado who reluctantly reveals to them his strict upbringing and the promise he made to his father. MooNs object his decision to quit and along with KiLLER KiNG, they unsuccessfully try to persuade him to reconsider. One evening, MooNs invite Mikado for a walk in the park in an attempt to remind him of the joys of being an idol, causing Mikado to have second thoughts about his decision. They later go to the radio station to broadcast their radio show, MooNs' Midnight Talk. Kazuna reads out a message from a fan who had experienced something similar to Mikado. Hearing this, Mikado realises his resolve and he responds to the message with a speech of how to not abandon one's dreams and to not let anyone else control one's life. The episode ends with Mikado defying his father for the first time by ripping up his resignation form in front of his father's secretary and severing ties with his family.
19	7	"MIRROR COMPLEX" "MIRROR COMPLEX" (Japanese: MIRROR COMPLEX)	Unite Contrast	February 22, 2019
The episode begins with Kitakore and MooNs flying to Hokkaido to perform in a studio concert for a TV show. They end up on separate flights; with Tomohisa going with MooNs, while MooNs' leader Kazuna accompanies Ryuji on a later flight. During the flight, Ryuji questions Kazuna about his inferiority complex towards Tomohisa, prompting him to recall how he felt when people said Kitakore would be more successful than MooNs after their debut. However, Ryuji reassures Kazuna of his own success as an idol when he reveals to him that Tomohisa also admires him as he never missed MooNs' performances. They eventually regroup in Hokkaido where Tsubasa meets up with them. She informs Tomohisa and Kazuna that they are scheduled to take part in a gourmet show about the food in Hokkaido before the studio concert. Both Tomohisa and Kazuna deliver a good performance. During the break, Kazuna discovers an annotated magazine about the food in Hokkaido in Tomohisa's bag. After remembering Ryuji telling him that no one gets to the top without hard work, Kazuna resumes his performance on the gourmet show with a better understanding of Tomohisa's skills and talent. The episode ends with Kitakore and MooNs performing at the studio concert. After the concert, Tsubasa receives a call from a private number. She answers her phone and is shocked when she is greeted by Yashamaru's voice. He informs her that he was the one who arranged the studio concert for Kitakore and MooNs in Hokkaido. Yashamaru then changes the subject by revealing to Tsubasa that he once had a younger sister who dreamed of becoming an idol. However, she was mentally broken by Tsubasa's father whom Yashamaru claimed had betrayed her. He explains that her father made a song which his sister was supposed to sing, but he gave that song to another artist instead. Unbeknownst to Tsubasa, Hikaru and Momotaro notice her on the phone with a terrified expression.
20	8	"TRUE THING" "TRUE THING" (Japanese: TRUE THING)	TBA	March 1, 2019
The episode begins with B-Pro and Tsubasa attending a meeting to discuss a second live concert at the Japan Dome with the addition of KiLLER KiNG, following the success of the first live concert. Tsubasa finds herself unable to concentrate during the meeting and B-Pro immediately notice her odd behaviour. She tries to keep quiet about her phone call with Yashamaru, but when Hikaru and Momotaro bring it up, she reluctantly reveals to everyone that Yashamaru had contacted her. Everyone goes to Kitakore's apartment where Tomohisa reveals to Tsubasa that he and B-Pro did some investigating, and they found out her father was a famous composer named Yu Saikai. He also tells her about Yashamaru's sister who at that time, was an up-and-coming idol whose career was hindered due to her frail health. Ten years ago, Saikai wrote a theme song for a drama, and Yashamaru's sister was chosen to sing that song. However, that song was given to the lead actress of the drama instead and Yashamaru's sister passed away after that. An issue arises when Tsubasa is informed by the radio station that MooNs' radio show is scheduled at the same time when MooNs is supposed to perform at a studio concert. The issue is soon solved when THRIVE and KiLLER KiNG volunteer to temporarily fill-in for MooNs' Midnight Talk which becomes a success. Later that night, Tsubasa visits the cemetery to pay her respects to Yashamaru's sister and is confronted by Yashamaru who vows to continue his revenge against her father by making her suffer. Tsubasa attempts to make amends with him, but she is interrupted when B-Pro arrive. B-Pro defends Tsubasa from Yashamaru, and they are later joined by Atsushi and Shūji Daikoku. Atsushi reveals to Yashamaru that Saikai was not responsible for the change of artists, but the producer of the drama who asked the leading actress to sing Saikai's song. Despite everything being explained to Yashamaru, he refuses to accept what he believed was his own misunderstanding and runs off, but not before telling Tsubasa that he will never forgive her. The episode ends with Tsubasa resuming her role as B-Pro's A&R and finally being able to move forward.
21	9	"SUMMER CAMP" "SUMMER CAMP" (Japanese: SUMMER CAMP)	TBA	March 8, 2019
The episode begins with the twins, Haruhi and Yuzuki discussing with Yuta about an overnight camping trip during their free time. However, due to everyone having individual work, only Nome, Kazuna, Momotaro, Goshi and Kento agree to accompany the twins and Yuta on the camping trip. They are lent the holiday cottage from Atsushi's acquaintance, and after doing a thorough cleaning, they explore a nearby waterfall Momotaro had recommended before the trip. When evening comes, they have BBQ for dinner until Yuta suddenly remembers that he had forgotten a watermelon he had left to cool in the river. Haruhi volunteers to go with him, until Yuzuki notices Haruhi's sunburnt arm causing him to make a fuss and leading into a disagreement between the twins. Yuta and Haruhi then go to fetch the watermelon, but because Yuta has a poor sense of direction, they end up getting lost in the forest and the situation worsens when their only flashlight breaks. As they sit down, Haruhi reveals to Yuta that he was very sickly as a child, and Yuzuki was the one who always took care of him. He wants to be able to protect Yuzuki in return and Yuta encourages him to apologise to his twin brother. Meanwhile, Yuzuki and Goshi decide to look for Yuta and Haruhi, and Yuzuki uses his GPS to find them which they do. The episode ends with Haruhi and Yuzuki making amends with each other while everyone is asleep.
22	10	"BRAVE ACTION" "BRAVE ACTION" (Japanese: BRAVE ACTION)	DIVE INTO THE WORLD	March 15, 2019
The episode begins with B-Pro training in preparation for a movie they are going to be starring in called "KING of CASTE". Akane and Momotaro are chosen to act out the climactic scene which involves; an exploding abandoned building and escaping on a helicopter. It is not long before Akane overhears the directors discussing about the stunt for the climactic scene. Akane immediately offers to perform the stunt himself, after learning that the stuntman who was initially hired was unavailable in the end. The directors are reluctant, due to their concerns for Akane's safety, and the president of Brave Entertainment, Shūji Daikoku, also refuses to let him perform the stunt after being contacted by Tsubasa. This prompts Akane to confront Shūji himself. THRIVE then reveal to Tsubasa that Akane was originally supposed to debut with them, but he was placed in KiLLER KiNG instead. THRIVE, KiLLER KiNG and Tsubasa then head to Brave Entertainment to convince Shuji to let Akane attempt the stunt. Shūji reluctantly agrees and B-Pro prepare for the filming while Akane starts practicing his stunt. After his first unsuccessful attempts, Akane sneaks back to practice after closing hours and is confronted by Kento who convinces him to not do things by himself and to be more reliant on others. With support from B-Pro and Tsubasa, Akane starts improving. On the day of filming the climactic scene, Akane becomes nervous since he only has one chance with his stunt, but Momotaro reassures him that he will be successful. The stunt becomes a success when Akane manages to jump from the exploding building and grab the rope ladder from the helicopter. The episode ends with B-Pro, Tsubasa and Shūji watching the completed film. B-Pro praises Akane for his stunt and they decide to give it their all in their second live concert as their next goal. Meanwhile, Shūji tells Tsubasa that Akane was placed in KiLLER KiNG, because everyone believed he would shine the brightest with them.
23	11	"TRAP AGAIN" "TRAP AGAIN" (Japanese: TRAP AGAIN)	TBA	March 22, 2019
Preparations for B-Pro's second live concert are underway. Their stage production is going to be designed and handled by a group of art technicians called "Culture Zone". However, during a talk show with Tomohisa, Goshi, Kazuna and Akane, it is suddenly announced that Highedge Records have also booked a concert on the same day at the same venue as B-Pro. This shocks everyone, and B-Pro wonder if Yashamaru is behind this. Tsubasa contacts her co-workers and she finds out that it was Yashamaru who arranged for Highedge Record's performance at Japan Dome the same time as B-Pro's concert. After a few days, Tsubasa announces to B-Pro that because of the double-bookings and the fact Highedge Records announced their performance before they did, their concert has been cancelled. Determined to hold their second live concert, Tsubasa tells B-Pro that she and Gandara Music will try and look for a different venue, motivating the boys to resume rehearsing. Tsubasa and her co-workers begin phoning other venues for the next two weeks without much luck, until Yashamaru suddenly shows up one day and he takes charge of the situation by using his connections to secure a small venue called JDC Hall for B-Pro. Since JDC Hall is too small, "Culture Zone" decide to pull out of planning the stage productions, much to B-Pro's dismay. Yashamaru then takes B-Pro and Tsubasa to the roof of Gandara Music where he gives them a pep talk. He tells B-Pro that they are already privileged to have fans who love their music, and diminishing the size of the venue does not diminish their values as idols. This causes B-Pro to realise that making their fans happy is more important than the state-of-the-art, and they thank Tsubasa for finding them another venue to perform. The episode ends with B-Pro deciding to give it their all for their second live concert, until Yuzuki notices that Yashamaru has disappeared, leaving everyone confused.
24	12	"CLIMAX EMOTION" "CLIMAX EMOTION" (Japanese: CLIMAX EMOTION)	Aete Kotoba ni Surunara	March 29, 2019
Due to the change of the venue, planning the second live concert becomes more difficult and the sponsors drop out despite Gandara Music's efforts to ensure the concert takes place. This causes the fans to start complaining as there is a possibility that B-Pro won't be able to hold their second live concert. However, despite the current situation, B-Pro remains positive by continuing their rehearsals. When Yuta suddenly suggests that they broadcast their performance live on TV, everyone gets on board with the idea and they contact Tsubasa about this. She hesitantly agrees with the idea and she immediately drafts up a plan to broadcast B-Pro's second live concert on TV. Tsubasa manages to recruit different companies who willingly assist her to create live viewing spaces across the country, and B-Pro's concert at Japan Dome is booked for July. Tsubasa then arranges to meet with the sponsors to show them her plan. Although the sponsors see potential success with her plan, they deem it as too unrealistic as their conclusion. However, Tsubasa manages to convince the sponsors by playing B-Pro's new song for their second live concert. Meanwhile, Shūji meets up with Yashamaru where he reveals that he figured out Yashamaru went back to investigate his sister after her death, and that he wasn't involved with the double-booking at the Japan Dome. He then asks him if helping Gandara Music secure JDC Hall for B-Pro's second live concert, and arranging for them to perform at Japan Dome in July was his way of atoning for his wrongdoings. Shūji also tells Yashamaru that B-Pro is waiting for him to tell them the truth by reminding him of how he brought them up to become idols, but Yashamaru brushes it off and leaves without giving a clear answer. The live broadcast of B-Pro's second live concert becomes a success and the episode ends with B-Pro performing their new song.

=== Music ===
Artist/s	Title	Songs	Release date
B-Project	Eikyuu Paradise (永久パラダイス)	Eikyuu Paradise	11/09/2015
Kitakore	Koiseyo Otome (恋セヨ乙女)	Koiseyo Otome Karma; Eikyuu Paradise (Kitakore Ver.); Kitakore Secret Talk (Drama Story)	25/11/2015
MooNs	Glory Upper	Glory Upper Over the Rainbow; Eikyuu Paradise (MooNs Ver.); MooNs Secret Talk (Drama Story)	25/11/2015
THRIVE	dreaming time	dreaming time LOVE ADDICTION; Eikyuu Paradise (THRIVE Ver.); THRIVE Secret Talk (Drama Story)	25/11/2015
KiLLER KiNG	Kira Kira Smile (キラキラスマイル, Kira Kira Sumairu)	Kira Kira Smile Gokujō Fiction (極上フィクション, Gokujō Fikushon); KiLLER KiNG Secret Talk (Drama Story)	23/03/2016
THRIVE	Maybe Love	Maybe Love 3 ・ 2 ・ 1 JUMP!! Maybe Love (Off-Vocal); 3 ・ 2 ・ 1 JUMP!! (Off-Vocal)	23/03/2016
Kitakore	Mysterious Kiss	Mysterious Kiss Wonderful Days; Mysterious Kiss (Off-Vocal); Wonderful Days (Off-Vocal)	06/04/2016
MooNs	Brand New Star	Brand New Star Love☆Reboryu (ラブ☆レボリュ, Rabu☆Reboryu); Brand New Star (Off-Vocal); Love☆Reboryu (Off-Vocal)	06/04/2016
B-Project Kitakore	Kodō＊Ambitious (鼓動＊アンビシャス, Kodō＊Anbishasu)	Kodō*Ambitious Ashita wa, Kyou Yori Yume Miyou (明日は、今日より夢見よう); Kodō＊Ambitious (Karaoke); Ashita wa, Kyou Yori Yume Miyou (Karaoke)	06/07/2016
Kitakore THRIVE; MooNs	Hoshi to Tsuki no Sentence (星と月のセンテンス)	Hoshi to Tsuki no Sentence STARLIGHT; Yumemiru Power (夢見るPOWER); Hoshi to Tsuki no Sentence (Karaoke); STARLIGHT (Karaoke); Yumemiru Power (Karaoke)	27/07/2016
Goshi Kaneshiro (金城 剛士, Kaneshiro Gōshi) Mikado Sekimura (釈村 帝人, Sekimura Mikado)	B-Project: Kodō＊Ambitious Volume 2	Stand to the Top 2.5 Jigen de Tsukamaete (2.5次元でつかまえて)	28/09/2016
Ryūji Korekuni (是国 竜持, Korekuni Ryūji) Momotaro Onzai (音済 百太郎, Onzai Momotaro)	B-Project: Kodō＊Ambitious Volume 3	Koakuma Game (コアクマGame) magic JOKER	26/10/2016
Yuta Ashu (阿修 悠太, Ashū Yūta) Hikaru Osari (王茶利 暉, Osari Hikaru)	B-Project: Kodō＊Ambitious Volume 4	Happy Ending Arigatou no Harmony (ありがとうのHarmony)	30/11/2016
B-Project	Muteki＊Dangerous (無敵＊デンジャラス, Muteki＊Denjarasu)	Muteki＊Dangerous Eikyuu Paradise (14 Vocal Ver.) Eikyuu Paradise (Short Size); Muteki＊Dangerous -message from B- Muteki＊Dangerous (Off Vocal); Eikyuu Paradise (Off Vocal)	21/12/2016
KiLLER KiNG	Hungry Wolf	Hungry Wolf Twinkle☆Bingo; Eikyuu Paradise (KiLLER KiNG Ver.); Hungry Wolf (Off-Vocal); Twinkle☆Bingo (Off-Vocal)	21/12/2016
Kento Aizome (愛染 健十, Aizome Kento) Kazuna Masunaga (増長 和南, Masunaga Kazuna)	B-Project: Kodō＊Ambitious Volume 5	LOVE IN SECRET x SEXY NIGHT Color of Heart	28/12/2016
MooNs	SUMMER MERMAID	SUMMER MERMAID Panorama (パノラマ); SUMMER MERMAID (Off-Vocal); Panorama (Off-Vocal)	18/01/2017
Tomohisa Kitakado (北門 倫毘沙, Kitakado Tomohisa) Tatsuhiro Nome (野目 龍広, Nome Tatsuhiro)	B-Project: Kodō＊Ambitious Volume 6	Starrynight Cinderella LONELY HEROES	25/01/2017
THRIVE	Needle No.6	Needle No.6 Tick-Tack; Needle No.6 (Off-Vocal); Tick-Tack (Off-Vocal)	22/02/2017
KiLLER KiNG	Break it down	Break it down Ready to YOU!! Break it down (Off-Vocal); Ready to YOU!! (Off-Vocal)	15/03/2017
Kitakore	Wonder☆Future (ワンダー☆フューチャー, Wandā☆Fūchā)	Wonder☆Future Vivid Scenery; Wonder☆Future (Off-Vocal); Vivid Scenery (Off-Vocal)	15/03/2017
B-Project THRIVE; KiLLER KiNG; Kitakore; MooNs	S-Kyuu Paradise (S級パラダイス) BLACK	S-Kyuu Paradise (S級パラダイス) the one&only Blooming Festa! Muteki＊Dangerous; Karma; 3 ・ 2 ・ 1 JUMP!! Glory Upper; Gokujō Fiction; Mysterious Kiss dreaming time Love☆Reboryu; Twinkle☆Bingo; Needle No.6; SUMMER MERMAID; Break it down	19/07/2017
B-Project Kitakore; MooNs; THRIVE; KiLLER KiNG	S-Kyuu Paradise (S級パラダイス) WHITE	S-Kyuu Paradise (S級パラダイス) Jikū no Rasen (時空の螺旋); PRAY FOR... Eikyuu Paradise; Wonder☆Future; LOVE ADDICTION; Brand New Star; Ready to YOU!! Wonderful Days; Tick-Tack; Panorama; Hungry Wolf; Koiseyo Otome; Maybe Love; Over the Rainbow; Kira Kira Smile	19/07/2017
KiLLER KiNG Yuduki Teramitsu (寺光唯月, Teramitsu Yudzuki); Haruhi Teramitsu (寺光遙日, Teramitsu Haruhi); Akane Fudo (不動明謙, Fudo Akane); Miroku Shingari (殿 弥勒, Shingari Miroku)	Phantom・of・Love (ファントム・オブ・ラブ, Fantomu・obu・Rabu)	Phantom・of・Love umbrella Zeccho Teki WANTED! (絶頂的WANTED!); Himitsu no Koi (ヒミツの恋); Breaking now Phantom・of・Love (Off-Vocal) umbrella (Off-Vocal); Zeccho Teki WANTED! (Off-Vocal); Himitsu no Koi (Off-Vocal); Breaking now (Off-Vocal)	18/03/2018
THRIVE Goshi Kaneshiro; Yuta Ashu; Kento Aizome	Ultra-sensitive Destiny (超感デスティニー, Chōkan Desutinī)	Ultra-sensitive Destiny Lonely Fangs; ALL RIGHT!! LOVE GAME; Ultra-sensitive Destiny (Off-Vocal); Lonely Fangs (Off-Vocal); ALL RIGHT!! (Off-Vocal); LOVE GAME (Off-Vocal)	18/03/2018
MooNS Kazuna Masunaga; Momotaro Onzai; Mikado Sekimura; Tatsuhiro Nome; Hikaru Osari	GO AROUND	GO AROUND Daytime star (TBA); Movin' on Let's have Fun♪ Never Surrender; Breath; GO AROUND (Off-Vocal); Daytime star (Off-Vocal); Movin' on (Off-Vocal); Let's have Fun♪ (Off-Vocal); Never Surrender (Off-Vocal); Breath	16/05/2018
Kitakore Tomohisa Kitakado; Ryuji Korekuni	Crank In (クランクイン, Kurankuin)	Crank In My Dearest Wish (TBA); Poison Apple Soiree (TBA); Crank In (Off-Vocal); My Dearest Wish (TBA) (Off-Vocal); Poison Apple Soiree (Off-Vocal)	16/07/2018
B-Project	Kaikan Everyday (快感エブリデイ, Kaikan Eburidei)	Kaikan Everyday After all this time Kaikan Everyday (Off-Vocal); After all this time (Off-Vocal)	16/07/2018
B-Project Kitakore; Tomohisa Kitakado; Ryuji Korekuni; THRIVE; Goshi Kaneshiro; Yuta Ashu; Kento Aizome; MooNS; Kazuna Masunaga; Momotaro Onzai; Hikaru Osari; Tatsuhiro Nome; Mikado Sekimura	Kodō*Ambitious Ashita wa, Kyou Yori Yume Miyou; Starrynight Cinderella; Koakuma Game; STARLIGHT; Stand to the Top; Happy Ending; LOVE IN SECRET x SEXY NIGHT; Yumemiru Power; Color of Heart magic JOKER; Arigatou no Harmony; LONELY HEROES; 2.5 Jigen de Tsukamaete; Hoshi to Tsuki no Sentence	28/11/2018	
B-Project	Zecchō＊Emotion (絶頂＊エモーション, Zecchō＊Emōshon)	Zecchō＊Emotion Hikari to Kage no Toki Musubu (光と影の時結ぶ); Zecchō Emotion (Off-vocal); Hikari to Kage no Toki Musubu (Off-vocal)	30/01/2019
THRIVE & KiLLER KiNG KiLLER KiNG	B-PROJECT～Zecchō＊Emotion～ 1 (B-PROJECT～絶頂＊エモーション～ 1, B-PROJECT～Zecchō＊Emōshon～ 1)	Juggler Love Winner; Hikari to Kage no Toki Musubu	27/03/2019
Kitakore	B-PROJECT～Zecchō＊Emotion～ 2 (B-PROJECT～絶頂＊エモーション～ 2, B-PROJECT～Zecchō＊Emōshon～ 2)	Aishū→Serenade (哀愁→セレナーデ) Hikari to Kage no Toki Musubu	24/04/2019
THRIVE	B-PROJECT～Zecchō＊Emotion～ 3 (B-PROJECT～絶頂＊エモーション～ 3, B-PROJECT～Zecchō＊Emōshon～ 3)	YOLO ～Act Now～ Hikari to Kage no Toki Musubu	29/05/2019
MooNs Kitakore & MooNs; MooNs	B-PROJECT～Zecchō＊Emotion～ 4 (B-PROJECT～絶頂＊エモーション～ 4, B-PROJECT～Zecchō＊Emōshon～ 4)	STARTIN' SHINY FANTASY Unite Contrast; Hikari to Kage no Toki Musubu	26/06/2019
