= The Delayed High School Life of a Laborer =

Japanese manga series

- First tankōbon volume cover

中卒労働者から始める高校生活 (Chūsotsu Rōdō-sha kara Hajimeru Kōkō Seikatsu)
- Genre: Romantic comedy
- Manga
- Written by: Minoru Sasaki
- Published by: Nihon Bungeisha
- English publisher: NA: Pocket Comics
- Magazine: Comic Heaven
- Original run: October 9, 2012 – present
- Volumes: 21
- Original net animation
- Released: November 30, 2018
- Episodes: 20

The Delayed High School Life of a Laborer (中卒労働者から始める高校生活, Chūsotsu Rōdō-sha kara Hajimeru Kōkō Seikatsu) is a Japanese manga series written and illustrated by Minoru Sasaki. It began serialization in Nihon Bungeisha's Comic Heaven magazine in October 2012. An original net animation adaptation aired on Production I.G's Anime Beans app in November 2018.

== Characters ==
Makoto Katagiri (片桐真実, Katagiri Makoto)
Voiced by: Toshiki Masuda
Maaya Katagiri (片桐彩, Katagiri Maaya)
Voiced by: Yoshino Aoyama
Rio Ōsawa (逢澤莉央, Ōsawa Rio)
Voiced by: Marina Yamada

== Media ==
=== Manga ===
Written and illustrated by Minoru Sasaki, The Delayed High School Life of a Laborer began serialization in Nihon Bungeisha's Comic Heaven magazine on October 9, 2012. Its chapters have been collected into twenty-one volumes as of April 2025.

The series was published in English on Comico's Pocket Comics app.

No.	Release date	ISBN
1	May 29, 2013	978-4-53-713039-3
2	January 29, 2014	978-4-53-713133-8
3	September 29, 2014	978-4-53-713203-8
4	May 29, 2015	978-4-53-713295-3
5	November 29, 2015	978-4-53-713371-4
6	May 28, 2016	978-4-53-713449-0
7	November 28, 2016	978-4-53-713514-5
8	May 29, 2017	978-4-53-713589-3
9	November 29, 2017	978-4-53-713660-9
10	May 28, 2018	978-4-53-713753-8
11	November 29, 2018	978-4-53-713850-4
12	May 29, 2019	978-4-53-713930-3
13	March 28, 2020	978-4-53-714228-0
14	September 28, 2020	978-4-53-714291-4
15	April 8, 2021	978-4-53-714359-1
16	September 29, 2021	978-4-53-714415-4
17	May 27, 2022	978-4-53-714509-0
18	January 27, 2023	978-4-53-714602-8
19	September 28, 2023	978-4-53-714701-8
20	April 26, 2024	978-4-53-714814-5
21	April 28, 2025	978-4-53-717226-3

=== Original net animation ===
An original net animation adaptation was announced on September 27, 2018. It aired on Production I.G's Anime Beans app on November 30, 2018.
