= Mobile Suit Gundam: Twilight AXIS =

Japanese light novel series

- Theatrical release poster for the movie compilation of the ONA series.

機動戦士ガンダム Twilight AXIS (Kidō Senshi Gandamu Towairaito Akushizu)
- Genre: Mecha, military science fiction
- Created by: Hajime Yatate; Yoshiyuki Tomino
- Light novel
- Written by: Kōjirō Nakamura
- Illustrated by: ARK Performance
- Published by: Sunrise
- Magazine: Yatate Bunko
- Original run: 7 November 2016 – 28 December 2017
- Original net animation
- Directed by: Se Jun Kim
- Written by: Se Jun Kim
- Music by: Takashi Ohmama
- Studio: Sunrise
- Licensed by: NA: Sunrise
- Released: 23 June 2017 – 1 September 2017
- Runtime: 3 minutes (EP. 1-5), 6 minutes (EP. 6)
- Episodes: 6
- Manga
- Written by: Azusa Maxima
- Published by: Kodansha
- Magazine: Monthly Young Magazine
- Original run: 20 October 2017 – 20 March 2019
- Volumes: 3
- Anime film

Mobile Suit Gundam: Twilight AXIS Red Trace
- Directed by: Se Jun Kim
- Written by: Se Jun Kim
- Music by: Takashi Ohmama
- Studio: Sunrise
- Licensed by: NA: Sunrise
- Released: 18 November 2017
- Runtime: 26 minutes

Mobile Suit Gundam: Twilight AXIS (機動戦士ガンダム Twilight AXIS, Kidō Senshi Gandamu Towairaito Akushizu) is a Japanese light novel series written by Kōjirō Nakamura and illustrated by ARK Performance, released by Sunrise under the Yatate Bunko imprint. It is the first Gundam anime to feature a main female protagonist. Set after the events of Mobile Suit Gundam Unicorn and before the events of Mobile Suit Gundam F91, in which it focuses on two former Zeon remnants as they were hired to investigate the remains of the asteroid base Axis. The novel is loosely based on Richard Wagner's opera Tristan und Isolde.

An original net animation series was released by Sunrise from 23 June 2017 to 1 September 2017. A theatrical compilation of the ONA series was released in theaters on 18 November 2017.

== Story ==
Set months after the events of Mobile Suit Gundam Unicorn, the story focuses on two former Principality of Zeon Remnants, former weapons developer Arlette Almage and former test pilot Danton Hyleg. Both of them are hired by the Earth Federation Forces research team to investigate the remains of the asteroid base Axis. But upon their arrival, they encounter a Cyber Newtype, Quentin Fermo, who pilots the mysterious mobile suit, the RX-78AN-01 Gundam Tristan. Tristan attacks them for unknown reasons.

== Characters ==
Arlette Almage (アルレット・アルマージュ, Aruretto Arumāju)
Voiced by: Risa Shimizu

A former Zeon mechanic who worked closely with Char Aznable. She was also a suspected Newtype, and was regularly tested by the Flanagan Institute. She moved with Danton to Side 6, and agreed to join Mastema's expedition in order to find out what happened to Char. Pilots the AMA-X4 Ahava Azieru.

Danton Hyleg (ダントン・ハイレッグ, Danton Haireggu)
Voiced by: Shuhei Sakaguchi

A former Zeon test pilot. Despite his incredible skills, he was unable to take a life, forcing him into a testing role. After the Second Neo Zeon War, he left for Side 6 with Arlette. He and Arlette are later recruited by Mastema to investigate the ruins of Axis. Pilots the AMX-011S Zaku III Custom and AMX-104 R-Jarja.

Mehmet Merca (メーメット・メルカ, Mēmetto Meruka)
Voiced by: Daisuke Ono

The leader of the Mastema special forces unit. He leads an expedition to Axis to find a rumored Psycoframe research facility.

Quentin Fermo (クァンタン・フェルモ, Kuantan Ferumo)
Voiced by: Toshiki Masuda

A Cyber Newtype who works for the Buch Junk Company. He is sent to investigate Axis after the Laplace Incident, but encounters Danton, Arlette, and the forces of Mastema. Pilots the RX-78AN-01 Gundam Tristan and RX-78KU-01 Kurwenal.

Walter Fermo (ヴァルター・フェルモ, Varutā Ferumo)

The brother of Quentin Fermo, working with the Buch Junk Company. Pilots the RX-160G Byarlant Isolde.

== Media ==
=== Light novel ===
Sunrise officially launched their own light novel publication arm Yatate Bunko as a way to expand the stories of their previous franchises such as Gundam, Armored Trooper Votoms, King of Braves GaoGaiGar Final and Matchless Raijin-Oh through monthly light novel series. The Twilight Axis light novel was written by Kōjirō Nakamura and illustrated by ARK Performance, the creative duo behind Arpeggio of Blue Steel. The first chapter was published in Yatate Bunko on 7 November 2016. Twenty chapters were published, with the last on 28 December 2017.

=== Anime ===
An original net animation series based on the novel was released by Sunrise on 23 June 2017 and ended on 1 September 2017, exclusively for Gundam Fan Club members in Japan It will be directed by Se Jun Kim with mecha designs from Shingo Abe and music by Takashi Ohmama. A theatrical compilation of the ONA episodes, titled Mobile Suit Gundam: Twilight AXIS Red Trace (機動戦士ガンダム Twilight AXIS 赤き残影, Kidō Senshi Gandamu Towairaito Akushizu Akaki Zanei) was released in theaters in Japan on 18 November 2017.

=== Manga ===
A manga adaptation of the novel by Azusa Maxima was serialized in Kodansha's Monthly Young Magazine between 20 October 2017 and 20 March 2019 and collected into three volumes.

=== Merchandise ===
Similar to previous Gundam series, merchandise for Twilight AXIS will be released under the High Grade Universal Century 1/144 Gunpla line. Bandai announced a HGUC 1/144 scale model of the RX-78AN-01 Gundam AN-01 Tristan for a June 2017 release to coincide with the anime's release. An exclusive P-Bandai HGUC 1/144 Zaku III Custom was also announced.

Preceded by Gundam Build Fighters Try: Island Wars	Gundam metaseries (production order); 2017	Succeeded by Mobile Suit Gundam: The Origin: Loum Arc
Preceded by Mobile Suit Gundam Unicorn	Universal Century; U.C. 0096	Succeeded by Mobile Suit Gundam Narrative
