= Moratorium (law) =

Delay or suspension of an activity or a law

A moratorium is a delay or suspension of an activity or a law. In a legal context, it may refer to the temporary suspension of a law to allow a legal challenge to be carried out.

For example, animal rights activists and conservation authorities may request fishing or hunting moratoria to protect endangered or threatened animal species. These suspensions are intended to prevent the animals in question from being fished or hunted for an as-yet indeterminate amount of time.

Another instance is a delay of legal obligations or payment (debt moratorium). A legal official can order a delay of payment (which amounts to granting an extension) due to extenuating circumstances which render one party incapable of paying another at the current time.

In the context of capital punishment, it can be referred to as a temporary suspension of its practice, or suspension of verdicts resulting in execution.

== See also ==
- Justice delayed is justice denied
- Moratorium (disambiguation)
- Local ordinance
