= Pass the Monster Meat, Milady! =

Japanese light novel series

- First light novel volume cover

悪食令嬢と狂血公爵 〜その魔物、私が美味しくいただきます！〜 (Akujiki Reijō to Kyōketsu Kōshaku: Sono Mamono, Watashi ga Oishiku Itadakimasu!)
- Genre: Fantasy; Romantic comedy
- Novel series
- Written by: Kanata Hoshi
- Published by: Shōsetsuka ni Narō
- Original run: November 29, 2019 – present
- Light novel
- Written by: Kanata Hoshi
- Illustrated by: Peperon
- Published by: Kodansha
- Imprint: Kodansha Ranobe Books f
- Original run: April 2, 2021 – present
- Volumes: 4
- Manga
- Written by: Kanata Hoshi
- Illustrated by: Chika Mizube
- Published by: Kodansha
- English publisher: NA: Kodansha USA
- Imprint: KCx
- Magazine: Palcy
- Original run: March 22, 2021 – present
- Volumes: 13
- Anime television series
- Directed by: Mutsumi Takeda
- Written by: Keiichirō Ōchi
- Music by: Takaaki Nakahashi
- Studio: Asahi Production
- Licensed by: Crunchyroll; SEA: Medialink
- Original network: TBS, BS11
- Original run: October 3, 2025 – December 19, 2025
- Episodes: 12
- icon

Pass the Monster Meat, Milady! (悪食令嬢と狂血公爵 〜その魔物、私が美味しくいただきます！〜, Akujiki Reijō to Kyōketsu Kōshaku: Sono Mamono, Watashi ga Oishiku Itadakimasu!) is a Japanese light novel series written by Kanata Hoshi and illustrated by Peperon. It began serialization online in November 2019 on the user-generated novel publishing website Shōsetsuka ni Narō. It was later acquired by Kodansha, who have published four volumes since April 2021 under their Kodansha Ranobe Books f imprint.

A manga adaptation with art by Chika Mizube has been serialized online via Kodansha's Pixiv-based Palcy website and app since March 2021 and has been collected in thirteen tankōbon volumes. An anime television series adaptation produced by Asahi Production aired from October to December 2025.

== Characters ==
Melphiera Marchalrayd (メルフィエラ・マーシャルレイド, Merufiera Māsharureido)
Voiced by: Kanna Nakamura (Japanese); Katie Wetch (English)
Aristide Rogier du Galbraith (アリスティード・ロジェ・ド・ガルブレイス, Arisutīdo Roje do Garubureisu)
Voiced by: Taito Ban (Japanese); Conner Allison (English)
Kauss/Chaos Laforg (ケイオス・ラフォルグ, Keiosu Raforugu)
Voiced by: Takashi Kondō (Japanese); Landon McDonald (English)
Mullan Sero (ミュラン・セロー, Myuran Serō)
Voiced by: Nobuhiko Okamoto (Japanese); Joshua Waters (English)
Maxim du Livastal Mild Langtias (マクシム・ド・リヴァストール・ミルド・ラングディアス, Makushimu do Rivuasutōru Mirudo Rangudiasu)
Voiced by: Ryōhei Kimura
Anbry/Ambry Shal (アンブリー・シャール, Anburī Shāru)
Voiced by: Makoto Furukawa (Japanese); Brian Vigen (English)
Zeff/Zeth Senjin (ゼフ・センジン, Zefu Senjin)
Voiced by: Daisuke Hirakawa
Claude Fole (クロード・フォール, Kurōdo Fōru)
Voiced by: Toshiki Masuda

== Media ==
=== Light novel ===
Written by Kanata Hoshi, Pass the Monster Meat, Milady! began serialization online on the user-generated novel publishing website Shōsetsuka ni Narō on November 29, 2019. It was later acquired by Kodansha who began publishing it with illustrations by Peperon under their newly-formed Kodansha Ranobe Books, its light novel publishing imprint on April 2, 2021. Four volumes have been released as of December 2, 2025.

No.	Release date	ISBN
1	April 2, 2021	978-4-06-522500-4
2	March 2, 2022	978-4-06-527579-5
3	April 1, 2023	978-4-06-531307-7
4	December 2, 2025	978-4-06-537789-5

=== Manga ===
A manga adaptation illustrated by Chika Mizube began serialization on Kodansha's Pixiv-based Palcy website and app on March 22, 2021. The manga's chapters have been collected into thirteen tankōbon volumes as of June 2026. The manga adaptation is licensed in North America by Kodansha USA. Kodansha is also publishing the series in English on their K Manga service.

No.	Original release date	Original ISBN	North American release date	North American ISBN
1	October 29, 2021	978-4-06-524691-7	December 12, 2023	979-8-88877-090-0
2	January 28, 2022	978-4-06-526372-3	February 13, 2024	979-8-88877-091-7
3	May 30, 2022	978-4-06-527626-6	April 9, 2024	979-8-88877-092-4
4	October 28, 2022	978-4-06-529379-9	June 18, 2024	979-8-88877-093-1
5	March 30, 2023	978-4-06-530820-2	August 13, 2024	979-8-88877-257-7
6	August 30, 2023	978-4-06-532526-1	October 15, 2024	979-8-88877-322-2
7	January 30, 2024	978-4-06-533772-1	February 11, 2025	979-8-88877-323-9
8	June 28, 2024	978-4-06-532526-1	May 27, 2025	979-8-88877-453-3
9	November 29, 2024	978-4-06-537385-9	December 30, 2025	979-8-88877-571-4
10	April 30, 2025	978-4-06-538746-7	August 11, 2026	979-8-88877-997-2
11	September 30, 2025	978-4-06-540637-3	November 10, 2026	979-8-88877-998-9
12	December 26, 2025	978-4-06-541793-5	—	—
13	June 30, 2026	978-4-06-543758-2	—	—

=== Anime ===
An anime television series adaptation was announced on October 21, 2024. It is produced by Asahi Production and directed by Mutsumi Takeda, with Keiichirō Ōchi handling series composition, Masato Kato designing the characters, and Takaaki Nakahashi composing the music. The series was originally scheduled for April 2025, but was later delayed due to "various circumstances", and eventually aired from October 3 to December 19, 2025, on TBS and BS11. (Note: TBS listed the series premiere on October 2 at 25:28, which is effectively October 3 at 1:28 a.m. JST.) The opening theme song is "Sugary Story" (シュガリー・ストーリー, Shugarī・Sutōrī), performed by AVAM, while the ending theme song is "Kibō Kōdo" (希望光度), performed by Shun'ichi Toki. Crunchyroll streamed the series. Medialink licensed the series in Southeast Asia for streaming on Ani-One Asia's YouTube channel.

==== Episodes ====
No.	Title	Directed by (Note: Production staff information is taken from the ending credits of each episode.)	Written by	Storyboarded by	Original release date
1	"A Jerky is a Promise: Skatzbitt"; Transliteration: "Hoshi Niku wa Yakusoku no Akashi ~Sukattsubitto~" (Japanese: 干し肉は約束の証 ～スカッツビット～)	Takahiro Ōtsuka	Keiichirō Ōchi	Shigeru Ueda	October 3, 2025
Melphiera is a daughter of Count Ghislain and finally old enough to marry. Unfortunately, she is obsessed with cooking monster meat, considered foul by most of society. At a party arranged by King Langhdeyas, her attendant Mrs. Talbot urges her to find a husband or risk being sent to the convent by her stepmother. As her reputation is already well known she is shunned by the nobles. A Backhorn attacks the party so she lures it away to save an elderly couple. She is saved by Aristide Rogier du Galbraith, known as the "Blood-Mad Duke" for his hunting obsession, who slays the Backhorn. Aristide is surprised she is not scared, but soon realizes she is the infamous "Voracious Villainess". Witnessing her passion and beauty Aristide falls instantly in love and expresses an interest in trying monster meat. Realizing he is not disgusted by her obsession, Melphiera falls in love with him. Aristide invites her to visit his lands where she can freely cook whatever he hunts. Aristides' butler Chaos intervenes to prevent a scandal. Before leaving, Melphiera gifts him monster jerky she made from a Skatzbitt, which he and Chaos both find delicious. Departing, Melphiera sincerely hopes she will see Aristide again.
2	"A Proposal from Above with a Gift"; Transliteration: "Kyūkon wa Sora Kara o Miyage o Motte" (Japanese: 求婚は空からお土産を持って)	Shunji Yoshida	Keiichirō Ōchi	Hayashi Naotaka	October 10, 2025
Several days pass and Melphiera's father receives a letter from Aristide requesting her hand in marriage. Prince Maxim, Aristide's older brother, is amused and advises him not to delay as Melphiera is the first woman he met with similar interests. Melphiera assumes Aristide has some ulterior motive, as does her father who, not wanting to associate with the "Blood-mad Duke", decides to reject the proposal. After Melphiera touches the letter, a spell reveals a more personal message promising Aristide will visit the very next day, leaving her father no time to send the rejection. Melphiera wonders if, with Aristides help, she can make monster farming a viable industry like her mother dreamed of. Melphiera's unpleasant stepmother Celia is outraged Aristide and his knights arrive riding dragons and he proposes to her through her bedroom window. Celia insists Aristide is an impolite, filthy beast, making Melphiera angry. Aristide reveals he brought her a still alive golden Royal Moodle as a gift, thrilling her as it can be made into a variety of dishes. Realising Aristide knows about Melphiera's hobby, her father allows them to stable their dragons in her mother's old research facility. Melphiera is excited but nervous about showing Aristide why she began eating monsters with her mother.
3	"Grilled Skewers of Prime Meat: Royal Moodle"; Transliteration: "Gokujō Kushi Niku no Aburi ～Rowaiya Mūdorā～" (Japanese: 極上串肉の炙り ～ロワイヤムードラー～)	Masahiko Watanabe	Keiichirō Ōchi	Takehiro Nakayama	October 17, 2025
Aristide is intrigued Melphiera uses a magic circle designed by her mother to drain monster magic blood before butchering them. She reveals her mother invented the technique during a famine when food was scarce but monsters were plentiful. Melphiera hopes one day monsters will be a food source alongside normal animals. She even uses the magical blood as a fuel source for ovens and lamps. He compliments her red hair, panicking her so she compliments how noble he appeared riding his dragon, and they both blush. Melphiera and Aristide make Moodle skewers they share with Chaos and the knights, causing them all to fall in love with monster cuisine. Melphiera shows Aristide her mother's laboratory, where she reveals she has a complicated relationship with her father's citizens who consider eating monsters a taboo, referred to as Animism. In fact, even the people her mother saved from starvation never admit they ate monster meat. As such, she keeps her research private in the laboratory. Melphiera claims she would only be a burden if Aristide married her but he insists he wants to know her better and for her to know him.
4	"Signaling Departure with a Pillar of Flame"; Transliteration: "Shuppatsu no Aizu wa Hibashira de" (Japanese: 出発の合図は火柱で)	Shunji Yoshida	Keiichirō Ōchi	Shinichi Watanabe	October 24, 2025
Aristide is certain watching him slay monsters must be disturbing, but she insists he appears noble when his magic Sight turns his eyes golden. In turn, she worries the people won't accept her as his fiancée. Aristide insists they will, since his lands often generate powerful monsters, so anyone with monster expertise would be welcome. Her father's knight captain Claude summons them to the mansion. He also warns Melphiera against discussing Animism any further. Aristide is upset Claude eavesdropped on their private conversation. Melphiera's father eventually believes Aristide loves Melphiera for who she is and agrees to the betrothal. He also shamefully admits to Aristide it was he who tarnished Melphiera's reputation, but only so no one would be interested in using her monster research for evil purposes. Melphiera packs up her research to move it to Aristide's lands. She decides to leave the Moodle's fur to be made into coats for her father and younger half-brother Louis. Before she leaves Celia takes her last opportunity to be nasty to Melphiera, comparing her to her mother Elise whom she despised. Melphiera is confused how Celia knew her mother. Her father regrets he won't be able to see her until the wedding in the autumn. Aristide is in such a good mood he teases her in front of her father then cheerfully sets fire to the obsolete research materials she planned to throw away.
5	"Night at Fort Ritterd"; Transliteration: "Ritterudo Toride no Yoru" (Japanese: リッテルド砦の夜)	Akira Kato	Keiichirō Ōchi	Ryoji Fujiwara	October 31, 2025
They spend the night at Fort Ritterd, exciting Melphiera as the area has fish and plant monsters. Aristide is surprised Melphiera is comfortable in the fort, but Melphiera explains she routinely slept on the floor in her lab. She finds knights Mullan and Zeth making porridge and insists on adding Moodle and vegetables. Aristide sulks that they got to try it before he did and refuses to eat, but Melphiera manages to coerce him into trying a bite. He then feeds her by hand feeding her an entire meal. He asks if they can address each other informally. He decides to call her Melphie and she decides to call him by his middle name Rogier. His Sight suddenly activates, causing him pain, so he decides to release his excess magic by catching a Zanas fish monster. Melphiera knows a build-up of magic toxins causes illness and death in humans like her mother, so if the same thing keeps happening to Aristide he might die too. She also remains angry that ignorant people spread rumours her mother died from eating monster meat. She promises herself she will complete her research and find a cure. The next morning she awakens in bed and realises she must have fallen asleep and Aristide carried her to bed. Despite his claims he has recovered she remains worried about his health.
6	"In Season: Battered and Deep-Fried Monster Fish"; Transliteration: "Ima ga Shun! Magyo no Koromoage ～Zanasu～" (Japanese: 今が旬！魔魚の衣揚げ ～ザナス～)	Takahiro Ōtsuka	Takayo Ikami	Hiroyuki Fukushima	November 7, 2025
Having trapped a Zanas fish monster Melphiera decides to kill it herself with a sword she had forged by her father's blacksmith, but it proves too heavy. Aristide does it for her with her sword, flustering her. Melphiera trials her new magic circle for removing the magic blood, written on oil paper instead of drawn on the ground and is pleased with the results. Aristide uses a fire spell to incinerate the head, with Mullan explaining Aristide invented the spell himself as a disposal method for monster corpses. Knight Ambry flays the skin so Melphiera can make battered fish. Aristide tries to copy her frying method but burns them. Melphiera assures him the fish is still edible and proves it by asking him to hand feed her the burnt ones. They discover the burnt ones have a whole different flavour and texture, with the knight's unable to decide which is tastier. Melphiera feels guilty for asking Aristide to help when he might still be unwell. Ambry and Zeth try the uncooked belly meat and find it is deliciously fatty and perfect for serving with sour Cabo fruit. Melphiera serves the fish for the entire fort's breakfast and discovers Aristide reacts negatively to sour flavours. After breakfast they resume their flight to Galbraith.
7	"Those Who Inherit The Galbraith Name"; Transliteration: "Garubureisu no Na o Tsugu Mono" (Japanese: ガルブレイスの名を継ぐ者)	Mao Sunaga	Keiichirō Ōchi	Bob Shirohata	November 14, 2025
Melphiera wonders what the Galbraith lands are like so Aristide admits the population has shrunk after a famine and drought 17 years ago. Aristide's adopted father died at that time due to a rise in monster attacks. As a knight Aristide swore to also give his life for his people if necessary. Melphiera is upset he is prepared to accept death so easily. Aristide admits he is actually the second son of the previous King, meaning he is the younger brother of the current King, Maxim. Due to the danger of his Sight running out of control Aristide began spending less time around Maxim and grew up around the knights, including Chaos. Aristide also admits during the famine there were nobles who wished to make Aristide the crown prince and send him to conquer other nations. To prevent civil war the King had Aristide adopted by the Duke of Galbraith, then abdicated the throne so Maxim became King. Aristide began exterminating monsters on Galbraith lands, selling the valuable ones to Maxim for funds to help end the famine. Melphiera reveals if she can perfect a technique to remove excess magic she can stop monsters going insane, meaning Aristide won't have to risk his life anymore. They fly over the Erzenye Woods rich in magical ores which can't be mined due to the high monster population. They cross the Calbirth River which is so vast Melphiera can't understand how it all dried up during the drought. Berguignon monsters attack them, forcing them to try and escape.
8	"Uses for Cloudy Quartz"; Transliteration: "Maryoku iri Kumori Suishō no Tsukaimichi" (Japanese: 魔力入り曇水晶の使い道)	Takeshi Kubamoto	Takayo Ikami	Satoshi Shimizu	November 21, 2025
Melphiera deduces Aristide and the knights can't attack the Berguignons like they normally would due to carrying her and her bags. She suggests throwing her bags at the Berguignon's as the anti-theft spells should explode on impact, but Aristide refuses as they are almost at Galbraith's border where more knights are waiting. Desperate to help Melphiera takes the flask filled with the Zanas' magic blood and writes as many explosion-based spells on the glass as she can remember, then activates it with Aristide's blood. Aristide hurls the flask at the Berguignons, causing an explosion so large it incinerates the entire flock. Aristide is impressed but Melphiera realises her research is dangerous as it allowed the creation of a bomb with such destructive power using the magic of only one monster. Anything larger than that could be used to destroy entire kingdoms. Aristide assures her in small enough flasks it can be safely used as a fuel source to improve his people's lives, not as a weapon. Chaos arrives and begins yelling at Aristide for using such a dangerous spell, unaware it was Melphiera that created it. More knights arrive and safely escort them to Middlaeg, the fortress city of Galbraith where Aristide's mansion is located. From its walls and overhead magic barrier Melphiera can tell Middlaeg is a fortress used to battling against monsters.
9	"The Voracious Villainess's Resolve"; Transliteration: "Akujiki Reijō no Ketsui" (Japanese: 悪食令嬢の決意)	Akira Kato	Keiichirō Ōchi	Bob Shirohata	November 28, 2025
Melphiera is happy to see Middlaeg is a thriving city with farms, markets and happy people. Aristide plans to spread word about the safe consumption of monsters thanks to Melphiera. She notices Aristide's dragon watching the meat being unpacked and convinces him to feed the rest of the Moodle meat to his dragon as a treat. Melphiera notices riding the dragon has left her hair a mess. Aristide panics at not having noticed how upset she was and summons Captain Blanche Lusable, Vice-captain Natalie and Lady Lillian of the Blanche Corps, all female knights and the only women Aristide can think of asking for assistance. As Melphiera's bodyguards the Corps swears to protect and aide her with whatever she desires. In turn, Melphiera swears to become a Duchess worthy of their respect. Noticing the quality of Blanche's sword Melphiera learns it was forged by the same smith that forged Aristide's sword and asks to meet him as she desires a sword she can actually use. Blanche helps Melphiera fix her hair in a fashion she hopes Aristide finds appealing. Blanche worries about Melphiera's desire for a sword, until learning she wants it to butcher monsters. Melphiera finds Lillian is also interested in monster cuisine.
10	"The Blood-Mad Duke's Intentions"; Transliteration: "Kyōchi Kōshaku no Omowaku" (Japanese: 狂血公爵の思惑)	Mao Sunaga	Takayo Ikami	Hiroshi Matsuzono	December 5, 2025
Mullan notices there is a private door between Aristide and Melphiera's bedrooms. Aristide worries about the Berguignons, which have never pursued prey in so determined a manner before. Aristide decides the pack leader must have gone insane from excess magic. Chaos arrives to yell at Aristide for not introducing Melphiera to her official maids; Chaos' own mother Mrs Lafourge, Mrs Jourdan the wife of a senior knight, and Mullan's sister Mrs Serreau. Chaos and Aristide assign Mullan to the Blanche Corps to protect Melphiera and forbid him from revealing it was Melphiera that constructed the explosion spell. With the details decided, Chaos decides to beat them up for having Zanas for breakfast at Fort Ritterd without him. Aristide is forced to deal with the surviving Berguignons and at Melphiera's request promises to bring back fruit from a Screamwood Tree monster, as she heard a rumour Aristide ate it once and hated it whereas Mullan supposedly enjoyed it. Aristide doesn't return for three days but when he does, he presents Melphiera with Screamwood fruit, some red and some black. Melphiera discovers the red is from a living tree, having a foul smell and sour taste, while the black is from a dead tree and contains high levels of insanity causing magic. Removing the magic like normal renders the fruit safe to eat and pleasantly sweet.
11	"Sweet or Sour Fruit"; Transliteration: "Sono Kajitsu, Amai ka Shibui ka ～Sukurimūūddo～" (Japanese: その果実、甘いか渋いか ～スクリムウーウッド～)	Takahiro Ōtsuka	Takayo Ikami	Ryoji Fujiwara	December 12, 2025
After further testing Melphiera demonstrates most of the fruit's magic is in the seed, which is easily removed, and that the red fruits are red due to being unripe and not edible yet. They eat half the fruit and find it is the sweetest, most delicious fruit they have ever had. Melphiera saves the other half for Aristide, who was once badly poisoned by a Screamwood fruit, to show him how good it is. Aristide plays a joke on her, then apologises by revealing a Sirius wolf puppy, the symbol of Galbraith ever since the first Duke took one as a pet. He reveals the puppy was separated from its parents by another Berguignon, and once his knights find them the puppy will be returned to them. Melphiera arranges for it to be fed monster meat, which it must surely have been fed by its parents. She and Aristide also enjoy feeding each other the fruit, which Aristide enjoys immensely. Aristide reveals Blanche's husband Galeo is the blacksmith that forged his sword. Blanche also admits her husband is stubborn, bad tempered, foul mouthed and only forges swords for those he approves of, so if Melphiera wants one of his swords she will need to impress him. Several days later Melphiera prepares for her first official appearance as Duchess of Galbraith.
12	"The Voracious Villainess's First Appearance"; Transliteration: "Akujiki Reijō no Ohirome" (Japanese: 悪食令嬢のお披露目)	Masahiko Watanabe	Keiichirō Ōchi	Bob Shirohata	December 19, 2025
Melphiera is introduced to all of Middlaeg's knights and despite her intense embarrassment, she finds them rough but welcoming. She and Aristide decide to share meals with the men so they can get to know her as their Duchess. The men are confused by Melphiera's claim she first met Aristide covered in blood as he killed a Backhorn. The story also draws the attention of Galeo, Blanche's husband and a giant almost as big as a Backhorn himself. Aware she wants one of his swords Galeo insists on testing her by sharing Kylstil Snake Wine, made by pickling an extremely venomous snake monster in alcohol. Already familiar with the species Melphiera happily drinks an entire glass and even asks for a second. Chaos panics, revealing the wine is so strong it is usually diluted with water first, but Melphiera turns out to have an unusually high tolerance. Blanche suddenly appears, furious Galeo tested Melphiera by trying to get her drunk, and drags him home to punish him. On the way out Galeo promises to provide Melphiera the blade she needs. The Sirius puppy learns how to use his species flying magic and uses it to escape, having become attached to Melphiera and Aristide. They decide it is time to return him to his parents in Erzenye Woods, famous for the variety of monsters that live there.
