= Moratorium =

Moratorium (from Late Latin morātōrium, neuter of morātōrius, "delaying") may refer to:

== Law ==
- Moratorium (law), a delay or suspension of an activity or a law

== Music ==
- Moratorium (Broadcasts from the Interruption), 2021 compilation album by Enter Shikari
- "Moratorium", a song by Alanis Morissette on her album Flavors of Entanglement
- "Moratorium", a song by Band-Maid on their album Just Bring It

== Protests ==
- Black Moratorium, January 1972 Indigenous rights protest in Australia
- Moratorium to End the War in Vietnam, demonstrations against the Vietnam War held in the United States and Australia in 1969

== Other uses ==
- 2010 United States deepwater drilling moratorium, a six-month suspension following a catastrophic oil spill in the Gulf of Mexico
- Debt moratorium, delay allowed in repayment of debts
- July Moratorium, a period with limited activity in the National Basketball Association (NBA) before their salary cap is announced
- Moratorium (entertainment), the practice of suspending sales of home videos by the distributors
- United Nations moratorium on the death penalty, 2007/8 resolutions of the UN
