= Risa Shimizu (actress) =

Japanese voice actress (born 1988)

- 清水 理沙
- Born: September 9, 1988 (age 37); Kanagawa Prefecture, Japan
- Education: Kunitachi College of Music
- Occupations: Actress; voice actress; narrator
- Years active: 1998–present
- Agent: Voice Kit
- Height: 152 cm (5 ft 0 in)
- Website: ashley-r-senzatempo.seesaa.net

Risa Shimizu (清水 理沙, Shimizu Risa; born September 9, 1988) is a Japanese actress and narrator. She was born and raised in Kanagawa Prefecture, Japan.

== Filmography ==
=== Television animation ===
List of voice performances in anime
Year	Title	Role	Notes	Sources
2001	Cyborg 009 The Cyborg Soldier	Kazu's sister 姉		
2004	Koi Kaze	Youko Tamaki 環央子		
2007	Nagasarete Airantō	Misaki Tōhōin 東方院美咲		
2008	Michiko & Hatchin	Sasha サーシャ		
2011	Lupin the 3rd: Blood Seal of the Eternal Mermaid	Misa 美沙		
2014	Rage of Bahamut: Genesis	Amira アーミラ	Lead role	
2015	Show By Rock!!	Angelica アンゼリカ		
2015	Ushio and Tora	Kagari / Hai Phong カガリ／ハイフォン		
2015	Concrete Revolutio	Ukyō Yamato 大和右京		
2016	Show by Rock!!#	Angelica アンゼリカ		
2017	Onihei	Oko / Omatsu / Woman おこう／お松／女		
2017	Attack on Titan	Lynne リーネ		
2022	Delicious Party Pretty Cure	Kokone Fuwa / Cure Spicy 芙羽ここね／お松／キュアスパイシー		
2023	Jujutsu Kaisen 2nd Season	Misato Kuroi 黒井美里		
2024	Puniru Is a Cute Slime	Mami Kirara 雲母麻美		
2026	Mao	Sana 紗那		
2026	A Hundred Scenes of Awajima	Eri Fujisawa 藤原江里		

=== Original net animation ===
List of voice performances in ONA
Year	Title	Role	Notes	Sources
2017	Mobile Suit Gundam: Twilight AXIS	Arlette Almage アルレット・アルマージュ	Lead role	
2021	Star Wars: Visions	Ochō お蝶		
2023	Junji Ito Maniac: Japanese Tales of the Macabre	Narumi 成美		

=== Original video animation ===
List of voice performances in OVA
Year	Title	Role	Notes	Sources
2009	Saint Seiya: The Lost Canvas	Maria マリア		

=== Theatrical animation ===
List of voice performances in anime films
Year	Title	Role	Notes	Sources
2011	O-jii-san no Lamp	Setsu セツ		
2011	The Princess and the Pilot	Aristocrat 貴族		
2017	Napping Princess: The Story of the Unknown Me	Ikumi Morikawa 森川イクミ		
2018	Pokémon the Movie: The Power of Us	Mayor's Secretary マネキ		
2023	The Concierge at Hokkyoku Department Store	Paradise Parrot ゴクラクインコ		

=== Video games ===
List of voice performances in video games
Date	Title	Role	Notes	Source
2019	Judgement	Mafuyu Fujii	PC, Consoles	
2019	Kingdom Hearts III	Nameless Star	PC, Consoles; Japanese dub	
2019	Sekiro: Shadows Die Twice	Divine Child of Rejuvenation	PC, Consoles	
2019	League of Legends	Alune(Aphelios)	PC; Japanese dub	
2020	Arknights	Shining	iOS, Android	
2020	Cyberpunk 2077	Female V	PC, Consoles; Japanese dub	
2021	Lost Judgement	Mafuyu Fujii	PC, Consoles	
2023	Ys X: Nordics	Phylleia	Consoles	
2024	Silent Hill 2	Angela Orosco	Consoles, PC; Japanese dub	
2025	The Hundred Line: Last Defense Academy	V'ehxness	Nintendo Switch, PC; Japanese dub	

== Dubbing roles ==
=== Live-action ===
List of dubbing performances in live-action
Date	Title	Role	Notes	Source
Voice dub for Emilia Clarke
2013	Game of Thrones	Daenerys Targaryen	Lead role	
2015	Dom Hemingway	Evelyn Hemingway		
2016	Me Before You	Louisa "Lou" Clark	Lead role	
2020	Last Christmas	Katarina "Kate" Andrich	Lead role	
2023	Secret Invasion	G'iah		
Voice dub for Ariana Grande
2012	Victorious	Cat Valentine	Lead role	
2014	Sam & Cat	Cat Valentine	Lead role	
2015	Scream Queens	Sonya Herfmann / Chanel #2		
Voice dub for Alexa Vega
2001	Spy Kids	Carmen Cortez		
2002	Spy Kids 2: The Island of Lost Dreams	Carmen Cortez		
2003	Spy Kids 3-D: Game Over	Carmen Cortez		

Date	Title	Role	Voice dub for	Notes	Source
2004	Cold Creek Manor	Kristen Tilson	Kristen Stewart		
2004	Lemony Snicket's A Series of Unfortunate Events	Violet Baudelaire	Emily Browning		
2010	The Uninvited	Anna Ivers	Emily Browning		
2010	Murderland	Carrie	Bel Powley		
2013	Game of Thrones	Rickon Stark	Art Parkinson		
2013	The Conjuring	Christine Perron	Joey King		
2015	Ted 2	Samantha Jackson	Amanda Seyfried		
2016	The Gambler	Amy Phillips	Brie Larson		
2016	Pitch Perfect 2	Emily Junk	Hailee Steinfeld		
2016	In a Valley of Violence	Mary-Anne	Taissa Farmiga		
2016	Guernica	Teresa	María Valverde		
2017	A Series of Unfortunate Events	Violet Baudelaire	Malina Weissman		
2017	XXX: Return of Xander Cage	Serena Unger	Deepika Padukone		
2017	Murder on the Orient Express	Countess Helena Andrenyi	Lucy Boynton		
2018	Peter Rabbit	Flopsy Rabbit	Margot Robbie		
2018	Solo: A Star Wars Story	Enfys Nest	Erin Kellyman		
2018	The Handmaid's Tale	Janine Lindo	Madeline Brewer		
2018	The Ballad of Buster Scruggs	Alice Longabaugh	Zoe Kazan		
2019	Gentleman Jack	Ann Walker	Sophie Rundle		
2019	The Nun	Sister Irene	Taissa Farmiga		
2019	Little House on the Prairie	Laura Ingalls Kendall	Melissa Gilbert	2019 NHK BS4K edition	
2019	Tolkien	Edith Bratt	Lily Collins		
2020	Star Trek: Picard	Dahj and Soji Asha	Isa Briones		
2020	Emma	Emma Woodhouse	Anya Taylor-Joy		
2020	Jojo Rabbit	Elsa	Thomasin McKenzie		
2020	Little Women	Margaret "Meg" March	Emma Watson		
2020	The New Mutants	Danielle "Dani" Moonstar / Mirage	Blu Hunt		
2020	Clouds	Amy Adamle	Madison Iseman		
2020	Good Boys	Hannah	Molly Gordon		
2021	Peter Rabbit 2: The Runaway	Flopsy Rabbit	Margot Robbie		
2021	In the Heights	Nina Rosario	Leslie Grace		
2021	Don't Look Up	Riley Bina	Ariana Grande		
2022	Old	Maddox Cappa	Thomasin McKenzie		
2022	Three Christs	Becky Henderson	Charlotte Hope		
2022	The Lord of the Rings: The Rings of Power	Eärien	Ema Horvath		
2022	The Time Traveler's Wife	Annette DeTamble	Kate Siegel		
2023	A Man Called Otto	Sonya	Rachel Keller		
2023	Asteroid City	June Douglas/Lucretia Shaver	Maya Hawke		
2023	Everything I Know About Love	Nell	Marli Siu		
2023	Normal People	Marianne	Daisy Edgar-Jones		
2023	The Nun II	Sister Irene	Taissa Farmiga		
2023	Wonka	Barbara	Charlotte Ritchie		
2024	Tarot	Haley	Harriet Slater		

=== Animation ===
List of dubbing performances in animation
Date	Title	Role	Notes	Source
1999	The Lion King II: Simba's Pride	Young Vitani		
2012	Adventure Time	Breezy		
2013	ParaNorman	Agatha "Aggie" Prenderghast		
2015	Thunderbirds Are Go	Lady Penelope Creighton-Ward		
2016	Storks	Tulip		
2016	Trolls	Poppy	Lead role	
2017	Niko and the Sword of Light	Lyra	Lead role	
2018	The Boss Baby	Mother of the Triplets		
2021	Inside Job	Reagan Ridley	Lead role	
2023	Ruby Gillman, Teenage Kraken	Bliss		
2024	Hazbin Hotel	Charlie Morningstar	Lead role	
2024	The Lord of the Rings: The War of the Rohirrim	Young Héra		
2024	Trolls Band Together	Poppy	Lead role	
2024	Secret Level	Puck		
2025	Helluva Boss	Bethany Ghostfucker		
