= Toshiki Masuda =

Japanese voice actor (born 1990)

- 増田 俊樹
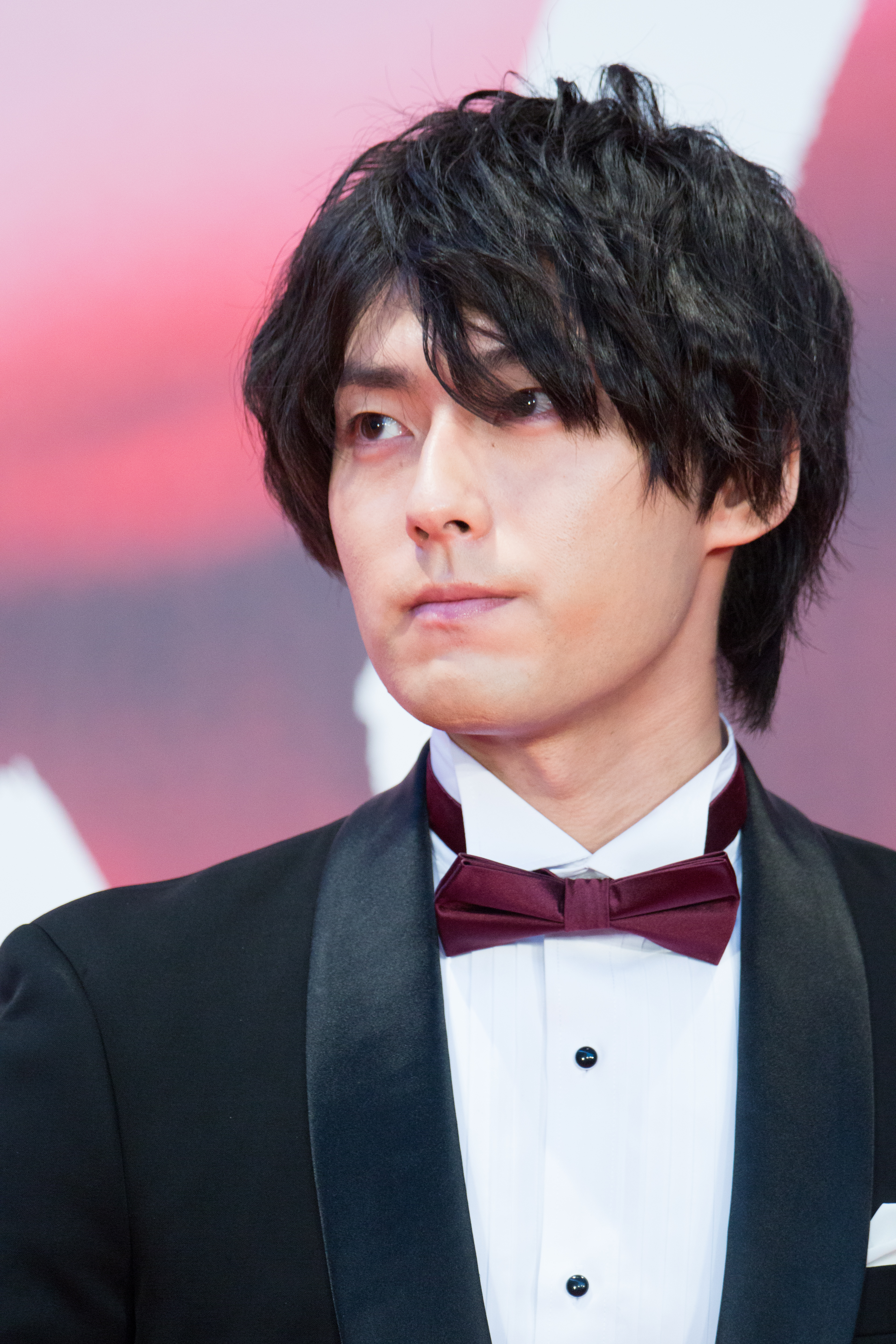
- Masuda at the Opening Ceremony of the Tokyo International Film Festival, 2017
- Born: March 8, 1990 (age 36); Kure, Hiroshima, Japan
- Occupations: Actor; voice actor; singer
- Years active: 2009–present
- Agent: Toy's Factory
- Musical career
- Genres: J-pop; anime song
- Instrument: Vocals
- Years active: 2019–present
- Label: Toy's Factory
- Website: www.toshikimasuda.jp

Toshiki Masuda (増田 俊樹, Masuda Toshiki; born March 8, 1990) is a Japanese actor and singer previously affiliated with Space Craft Group. He became a freelancer in August 2018. He joined the record label Toy's Factory in November 2018 as a voice actor and solo singer.

== Biography ==
Masuda was born on March 8, 1990, in Kure, Hiroshima. His family consists of his father, mother, and a younger brother. He became interested in voice acting during high school after watching the anime series Code Geass and Gurren Lagann, the latter piquing his interest in the area. In 2008, he moved to Tokyo and entered the broadcasting department of the Tokyo Announce Gakuin Performing Arts College.

In 2009, he auditioned for Musical: The Prince of Tennis and was selected for the role of Seiichi Yukimura, which was his debut role. In September 2010, Masuda decided to stop pursuing theater for some time and focus on voice acting, and he was transferred to the voice actors division of his former agency, Space Craft. He began his activities as a voice actor in October, being an assistant on the radio show A & G Artist Zone 2h. In April 2011, Masuda landed his first regular role in an anime series, Yu-Gi-Oh! Zexal, voicing Ryōga Kamishiro.

In October 2011, Masuda and fellow voice actor Yoshimasa Hosoya starred in a radio show titled Hosoya Yoshimasa ・ Masuda Toshiki no Zenryoku Danshi, which ran until March 31, 2013. In February 2012, Masuda and Hosoya formed a unit called "MaxBoys" and released a CD.

In 2013, he voiced the main character Masayoshi Hazama/Samurai Flamenco in the Samurai Flamenco series, and in 2014 voiced Chikara Ennoshita in Haikyu!!. In 2015, he voiced Ryuu Zaō in Cute High Earth Defense Club Love! and its sequel Cute High Earth Defense Club Love! Love! in 2016. In 2017, he landed the lead role of Masahiro Setagawa in Hitorijime My Hero.

Masuda became a freelancer in August 2018, after nine years under Space Craft. He joined record label Toy's Factory in November 2018 and on March 6, 2019, launched his debut extended play, This One. On January 8, 2020, he released his debut studio album, Diver. His second studio album, origin, was released on September 29, 2021.

A Japanese dubbed version of the film New Gods: Yang Jian was released in Japanese theaters on March 21, 2025, under the title Youzen. The voice cast includes Ae! Group's Masaya Sano as Youzen, one of the main characters, a bounty hunter who has lost his "divine power", and Masuda as Jinkou, a boy who stole "divine power". The group's song "ROCK'NPOP", which is included in their first album "D.N.A", is used as the film's theme song.

== Filmography ==
=== Television animation ===
Year	Title	Role	Source
2011	Yu-Gi-Oh! Zexal	Ryōga Kamishiro	
2011	Journey to Agartha	Villager	
2012	JoJo's Bizarre Adventure	Soldier	
2012	Yu-Gi-Oh! Zexal II	Ryōga Kamishiro	
2013	Ore no Kanojo to Osananajimi ga Shuraba Sugiru	Shintani	
2013	Pretty Rhythm: Rainbow Live	Kazuki Nishina	
2013	Namiuchigiwa no Muromi-san	Masuda-kun	
2013	Kimi no Iru Machi	Takashi Yura	
2013	Samurai Flamenco	Masayoshi Hazama/Samurai Flamenco	
2014	Noragami	Student A, Student B	
2014	Magical Warfare	Tendo Ushiwaka	
2014	Haikyū!!	Chikara Ennoshita	
2015	Ace of Diamond	Gou Wakabayashi	
2015	Binan Koukou Chikyuu Bouei-bu Love!	Ryuu Zaō	
2015	Haikyū!! 2	Chikara Ennoshita	
2015	Kuroko's Basketball 3rd Season	Koutarou Hayama	
2015	One-Punch Man	Charanko	
2015	Yamada-kun and the Seven Witches	Toranosuke Miyamura	
2015	Future Card Buddyfight 100	Ikazuchi	
2015	Noragami Aragoto	Abe	
2015	Durarara!!x2 Ten	Young Man	
2016	B-Project: Kodou*Ambitious	Mikado Sekimura	
2016	Grimgar of Fantasy and Ash	Ogu (ep 11)	
2016	Endride	Emilio	
2016	Kabaneri of the Iron Fortress	Kurusu	
2016	My Hero Academia	Eijiro Kirishima	
2016	Binan Koukou Chikyuu Bouei-bu Love! Love!	Ryuu Zaō	
2016	Fudanshi Kōkō Seikatsu	Akira Ueda	
2016	Handa-kun	Tsukasa Komichi	
2016	Tsukiuta. The Animation	Koi Kisaragi	
2016	Touken Ranbu: Hanamaru	Kashuu Kiyomitsu	
2016	Haikyū!! Season 3	Chikara Ennoshita	
2016	And You Thought There Is Never a Girl Online?	Battsu	
2016	Battery	Enomoto	
2017	Marginal#4: Kiss kara Tsukuru Big Bang	Atom Kirihara	
2017	Inazuma Eleven: Ares	Kira Hiroto	
2017	My Hero Academia Season 2	Eijiro Kirishima	
2017	Beyblade Burst God	Violet Eye	
2017	Hitorijime My Hero	Masahiro Setagawa	
2017	Nana Maru San Batsu	Haruomi Konoe	
2017	Ikémen Sengoku: Toki wo Kakeru Koi	Tokugawa Ieyasu	
2018	Zoku Touken Ranbu Hanamaru	Kashuu Kiyomitsu	
2018	IDOLiSH7	Iori Izumi	
2018	Darling in the Franxx	9'β	
2018	Pop Team Epic	Popuko (B part singing)	
2018	My Hero Academia Season 3	Eijiro Kirishima	
2018	Inazuma Eleven: Ares no Tenbin	Hiroto Kira	
2018	Gakuen Basara: Samurai High School	Tokugawa Ieyasu	
2018	Gaikotsu Shotenin Honda-san	Yōsetsu Mask	
2018	Hinomaru Sumo	Akihira Kanō	
2018	1-nichi Gaishutsuroku Hanchō	Miyamoto (Black Suits)	
2018	Shinkansen Henkei Robo Shinkalion	Kairen	
2019	The Price of Smiles	Huey Malthus	
2019	W'z	Midori	
2019	B-Project: Zecchō Emotion	Mikado Sekimura	
2019	King of Prism: Shiny Seven Stars	Kazuki Nishina	
2019	Magical Sempai	Kimura	
2019	Why the Hell are You Here, Teacher!?	Rin Suzuki	
2019	Ensemble Stars!	Rei Sakuma	
2019	Zoids Wild Zero	Christopher Giller	
2019	My Hero Academia Season 4	Eijiro Kirishima	
2020	A Destructive God Sits Next to Me	Aitsu	
2020	Attack on Titan: The Final Season	Porco Galliard	
2020	IDOLiSH7 Second Beat!	Iori Izumi	
2020	My Next Life as a Villainess: All Routes Lead to Doom!	Sirius Dieke / Raphael Walt	
2020	Talentless Nana	Yōhei Shibusawa	
2020	Tsukiuta. The Animation 2	Koi Kisaragi	
2020	Yo-kai Watch Jam – Yo-kai Academy Y: Close Encounters of the N Kind	Mera Raido	
2021	I-Chu: Halfway Through the Idol	Leon	
2021	Attack on Titan: The Final Season	Porco Galliard	
2021	My Hero Academia Season 5	Eijiro Kirishima	
2021	Pretty Boy Detective Club	Michiru Fukuroi	
2021	My Next Life as a Villainess: All Routes Lead to Doom! X	Sirius Dieke / Raphael Walt	
2021	Peach Boy Riverside	Hawthorn	
2021	IDOLiSH7 Third Beat!	Iori Izumi	
2021	Megaton Musashi	Yamato Ichidaiji	
2021	Visual Prison	Dmitri Romanee	
2022	Rusted Armors: Daybreak	Oda Nobunaga	
2022	Tribe Nine	Rankichi Umeda	
2022	Heroines Run the Show	Dai	
2022	Hanabi-chan Is Often Late	Kumazawa	
2022	I'm the Villainess, So I'm Taming the Final Boss	Cedric Jean Ellmeyer	
2022	More Than a Married Couple, But Not Lovers	Minami Tenjin	
2022	My Hero Academia Season 6	Eijiro Kirishima	
2023	High Card	Chris Redgrave	
2023	Edens Zero Season 2	Fie	
2023	Tearmoon Empire	Keithwood	
2024	My Hero Academia Season 7	Eijiro Kirishima	
2024	Oblivion Battery	Haruka Kiyomine	
2024	Tadaima, Okaeri	Yūto Matsuo	
2025	My Hero Academia: Final Season	Eijiro Kirishima	
2025	Pass the Monster Meat, Milady!	Claude Fole	
2025	Scooped Up by an S-Rank Adventurer!	Will	
2025	Übel Blatt	Wied	
2025	Wandance	Iori Itsukushima	
2026	A Misanthrope Teaches a Class for Demi-Humans	Rei Hitoma	
2026	There Was a Cute Girl in the Hero's Party, So I Tried Confessing to Her	Duke	
2026	Yoroi Shinden Samurai Troopers	Ryūsei Oda	
2026	Please Excuse My Younger Brothers	Gen Narita	
2026	The Elusive Samurai	Shibukawa Yoshisue	
2026	Keroro☆	Corporal Giroro	

=== Original video animation (OVA) ===
Year	Title	Role
2012	Kimi no Iru Machi: Tasogare Kousaten	Takashi Yura
2014	Kimi no Iru Machi	Takashi Yura
2014	Yamada-kun and the Seven Witches	Toranosuke Miyamura
2017	Binan Koukou Chikyuu Bouei Bu Love! Love! Love!	Ryuu Zaō

=== Original net animation (ONA) ===
Year	Title	Role
2017	Mobile Suit Gundam: Twilight AXIS	Quentin Fermo
2018	The Delayed High School Life of a Laborer	Makoto Katagiri
2021	Yoshimaho: Yoshi Yoshi Magic	Kai
2022	Kotaro Lives Alone	Shin Karino

=== Anime films ===
Year	Title	Role
2016	King of Prism by Pretty Rhythm	Kazuki Nishina
2017	Kuroko No Basket Movie 2: Winter Cup Soushuuhen – Namida No Saki E	Kotaro Hayama
2017	Kuroko No Basket Movie 3: Winter Cup Soushuuhen – Tobira No Mukou	Kotaro Hayama
2017	King of Prism: Pride the Hero	Kazuki Nishina
2017	Mobile Suit Gundam: Twilight Axis – Akaki Zan'ei	Quentin Fermo
2017	Touken Ranbu: Hanamaru – Makuai Kaisouroku	Kashuu Kiyomitsu
2018	Midnight Crazy Trail	Shout
2018	My Hero Academia: Two Heroes	Eijiro Kirishima
2019	Tannishō o Hiraku	Yuien
2019	Koutetsujou no Kabaneri: Unato Kessen	Kurusu
2019	My Hero Academia: Heroes Rising	Eijiro Kirishima
2019	Yo-kai Watch Jam the Movie: Yo-Kai Academy Y – Can a Cat be a Hero?	Mera Raido
2020	Kono Sekai no Tanoshimikata: Secret Story Film	Dai
2021	My Hero Academia: World Heroes' Mission	Eijiro Kirishima
2022	Ensemble Stars!! Road to Show!!	Rei Sakuma
2023	My Next Life as a Villainess: All Routes Lead to Doom! The Movie	Raphael Walt
2025	Make a Girl	Kunihito Ōbayashi
2025	Cute High Earth Defense Club Eternal Love!	Ryuu Zaō

=== Video games ===
Year	Title	Role	Console	Source
2015	Tokyo Mirage Sessions ♯FE	Kain	Wii U	
2016	Detective Pikachu	Simon Yen	Nintendo 3DS	
2016	Shin Megami Tensei IV: Apocalypse	Hallejuah	Nintendo 3DS	
2018	My Hero One's Justice	Eijiro Kirishima	PlayStation 4, Xbox One, Nintendo Switch, Microsoft Windows and PC	
2019	Yakuza 4 Remastered	Masayoshi Tanimura	PlayStation 4, Microsoft Windows, and Xbox One	
2019	Fate/Grand Order	Mandricardo	iOS, Android	
2020	My Hero One's Justice 2	Eijiro Kirishima	PlayStation 4, Xbox One, Nintendo Switch, Microsoft Windows, and PC	
2023	Engage Wars	Emilio Romero Álvarez	iOS, Android	
2023	Identity V	Frederick Kreiburg (Composer)	iOS, Android	
2024	Ex Astris	Lam	iOS, Android	
2024	Wuthering Waves	Rover (Male)	iOS, Android, PC	

=== Dubbing ===
Title	Role	Dubbing actor	Notes
The Bling Ring	Marc Hall	Israel Broussard	
Bravest Warriors	Chris Kirkman	Graeme Jokic	
Dolittle	Arthur	Jim Carretta	
Don't Worry Darling	Jack Chambers	Harry Styles	
Dunkirk	Alex	Harry Styles	
The Giver	Jonas	Brenton Thwaites	
John Wick: Chapter 4	The Marquis Vincent Bisset de Gramont	Bill Skarsgård	
Jurassic World Camp Cretaceous	Kenji Kon	Ryan Potter	
Jurassic World: Chaos Theory	Kenji Kon	Darren Barnet	
Mary & George	George Villiers, 1st Duke of Buckingham	Nicholas Galitzine	
Mr. Mercedes	Brady Hartsfield	Harry Treadaway	
Ms. Marvel	Kamran	Rish Shah	
The Santa Clauses	Cal-Claus	Austin Kane	
Squid Game	Thanos	T.O.P	
Six Flying Dragons	Moo-hyeol	Yoon Kyun-sang	
Trinkets	Luca Novak	Henry Zaga	
Valley of the Boom	Stephan Paternot	Dakota Shapiro	
Your Friendly Neighborhood Spider-Man	Lonnie Lincoln	Eugene Byrd	

== Discography ==
=== Singles ===
Year	Details	Catalog No.	Peak Oricon Chart Position
2022	Midnight Dancer: Released: January 26, 2022; Label: Toy's Factory	TFCC-89721 (Special Edition), TFCC-89723 (Normal Edition)	3

=== EP (Extended Plays) ===
Year	Details	Catalog No.	Peak Oricon Chart Position
2019	This One: Released: March 6, 2019; Label: Toy's Factory	TFCC-89667 (Special Edition), TFCC-89668 (Normal Edition)	8

=== Albums ===
Year	Details	Catalog No.	Peak Oricon Chart Position
2020	Diver: Released: January 8, 2020; Label: Toy's Factory	TFCC-86699 (Special Edition), TFCC-86700 (Normal Edition)	5
2021	origin: Released: September 29, 2021; Label: Toy's Factory	TFCC-86774 (Special Edition), TFCC-86776 (Regular Edition)	9

=== Character Song CDs ===
- Marginal Number 4|MARGINAL#4 as Kirihara Atom
- Tsukiuta. as Kisaragi Koi
- Dear Vocalist – Hyacinth (2015) as RE-O-DO
- B-Project – Glory Upper (2015) as Mikado Sekimura
- B-Project – Brand New Star (2016) as Mikado Sekimura
- B-Project – Kodō＊Ambitious (2016) as Mikado Sekimura
- B-Project – Hoshi to Tsuki no Sentence (2016) as Mikado Sekimura
- B-Project – B-Project: Kodō＊Ambitious Volume 2 (2016) as Mikado Sekimura
- Dear Vocalist – Ambitious Night (2016) as RE-O-DO
- B-Project – Muteki＊Dangerous (2016) as Mikado Sekimura
- B-Project – SUMMER MERMAID (2017) as Mikado Sekimura
- Dear Vocalist – Dear Vocalist THE BEST Rock Out!!! TYPE A (2017) as RE-O-DO
- B-Project – S-Kyuu Paradise BLACK/WHITE (2017) as Mikado Sekimura
- Dear Vocalist – iNiTiaTiVe (2017) as RE-O-DO
- Dear Vocalist – EXiT (2018) as RE-O-DO
- Dear Vocalist – Dear Vocalist THE BEST Rock Out!!! #2 TYPE A (2018) as RE-O-DO
- Dear Vocalist – CHAMPION (2019) as RE-O-DO
- Dear Vocalist – Dilemma (2021) as RE-O-DO
- Fabulous Night (2021) as Sol
