= Debt moratorium =

Government delay in the payment of debts

A debt moratorium is a delay in the payment of debts or obligations. The term is generally used to refer to acts by national governments. Moratory laws are usually passed at times of special political or commercial stress: for instance, on several occasions during the Franco-Prussian War, the French government passed moratory laws.

== Validity ==
Their international validity was discussed at length, and was upheld in the English law case Rouquette v Overman (1875) LR 10 QB. Debt moratoriums are generally opposed by creditors.

Proponents of debt moratoriums argue that it is a sovereign decision by the government of a nation to suspend repayment of debt to its creditors, if to do otherwise would do irreparable harm to the welfare of its citizenry. A debt moratorium may take the form of a complete cessation of debt repayments, or a partial cessation: for example, the government of President Alan García of Peru implemented the so-called "Ten Per Cent Solution", when it was announced that only 10% of export earnings would go to debt payment.

== Examples ==
Nations which have, at one time or another, declared a debt moratorium include Peru, Pakistan, Brazil, Ukraine, Mexico, Russia, and Argentina. In 2008, President Correa of Ecuador declared a moratorium on foreign debt repayments, describing the obligations as "immoral" and "illegitimate". Ultimately, the moratorium targeted two bonds in particular, and other obligations were paid.

Several European countries introduced various debt moratoria in connection with the consequences of the COVID-19 pandemic. On 4 April 2021, Supreme Court of India also asked the PSU banks in India for Interest waiver on loans for the moratorium of loans taken by citizens of India during pandemic lockdown.

== See also ==
- Moratorium (law)
