= The Vexations of a Shut-In Vampire Princess =

Japanese light novel series and its adaptations

- First light novel volume cover, featuring Terakomari Gandesblood

ひきこまり吸血姫の悶々 (Hikikomari Kyūketsuki no Monmon)
- Genre: Adventure; Fantasy comedy; Yuri
- Light novel
- Written by: Kotei Kobayashi
- Illustrated by: Riichu
- Published by: SB Creative
- English publisher: NA: Yen Press
- Imprint: GA Bunko
- Original run: January 11, 2020 – present
- Volumes: 14
- Manga
- Written by: Kotei Kobayashi
- Illustrated by: Riichu
- Published by: Square Enix
- English publisher: NA: Square Enix
- Imprint: Big Gangan Comics
- Magazine: Monthly Big Gangan
- Original run: December 25, 2021 – April 25, 2025
- Volumes: 4
- Anime television series
- Directed by: Tatsuma Minamikawa
- Written by: Keiichirō Ōchi
- Music by: Go Shiina
- Studio: Project No.9
- Licensed by: NA: Sentai Filmworks (Note: Home video rights through Section23 Films and streaming rights through Hidive (also in Australia and British Isles.)); SEA: Remow
- Original network: Tokyo MX, BS NTV, MBS, AT-X
- English network: SEA: Animax Asia
- Original run: October 7, 2023 – December 30, 2023
- Episodes: 12
- icon

The Vexations of a Shut-In Vampire Princess (Japanese: ひきこまり吸血姫の悶々, Hepburn: Hikikomari Kyūketsuki no Monmon) (Note: Hikikomari is a pun on the Japanese word hikikomori and the main protagonist named Terakomari.) is a Japanese light novel series written by Kotei Kobayashi and illustrated by Riichu. SB Creative began publishing the series in January 2020, with 14 volumes having been released as of December 2025. A manga adaptation by the novel's illustrator was serialized in Monthly Big Gangan from December 2021 to April 2025. As of December 2025, the series' individual chapters have been collected in four tankōbon volumes. This series follows a female vampire who awakens after three years to find she's been appointed as a military commander in the Mulnite Imperial Army.

An anime television series adaptation produced by Project No.9 aired from October to December 2023. Outside of Japan, it is licensed by Sentai Filmworks through Section23 Films in North America for home video distribution, and is streaming on Hidive.

== Characters ==
Terakomari Gandesblood (テラコマリ・ガンデスブラッド, Terakomari Gandesuburaddo)
Voiced by: Tomori Kusunoki (Japanese); Brittney Karbowski (English)
The protagonist of the series, she is a fifteen-year-old vampire who previously lived a shut-in life. Despite being a vampire, she is not fond of consuming blood, leading to her powers being weaker than that of other vampires.
Villhaze (ヴィルヘイズ, Viruheizu)
Voiced by: Sayumi Suzushiro (Japanese); Donna Bella Litton (English)
A girl who was hired to work as Komari's personal maid. She has a big crush on Komari and constantly tries to seduce her, much to Komari's annoyance and disgust.
Karen Helvetius (カレン・エルヴェシアス, Karen Eruveshiasu)
Voiced by: Yoko Hikasa (Japanese); Kira Vincent-Davis (English)
Nelia Cunningham (ネリア・カニンガム, Neria Kaningamu)
Voiced by: Fairouz Ai
Karla Amatsu (アマツ・カルラ, Amatsu Karura)
Voiced by: Miyuri Shimabukuro
Sakuna Memoir (サクナ・メモワール, Sakuna Memowāru)
Voiced by: Manaka Iwami
Millicent Bluenight (ミリセント・ブルーナイト, Mirisento Burūnaito)
Voiced by: Sora Amamiya (Japanese); Natalie Rial (English)
Melca Tiano (メルカ・ティアーノ, Meruka Tiāno)
Voiced by: Reina Ueda (Japanese); Annie Wild (English)
Tio Flat (ティオ・フラット, Tio Furatto)
Voiced by: Saku Mizuno
Gertrude (ガートルード, Gātorūdo)
Voiced by: Rina Hidaka
Koharu Minenaga (峰永 こはる, Minenaga Koharu)
Voiced by: Hina Kino
Chaostel Conte (カオステル・コント, Kaosuteru Konto)
Voiced by: Natsuki Hanae (Japanese); Scott Gibbs (English)
Belius Innu Cerberus (ベリウス・イッヌ・ケルベロ, Beriusu Innu Kerubero)
Voiced by: Masaaki Mizunaka (Japanese); Andrew Love (English)
Melakonsi (メラコンシー, Merakonshī)
Voiced by: Tasuku Hatanaka (Japanese); Greg Ayres (English)
Johan Helders (ヨハン・ヘルダース, Yohan Herudāsu)
Voiced by: Yūsuke Kobayashi (Japanese); Jack Stansbury (English)
Arman Gandesblood (アルマン・ガンデスブラッド, Aruman Gandesuburaddo)
Voiced by: Jun Fukushima (Japanese); Brandon Hearnsberger (English)
Flöte Mascarail (フレーテ・マスカレール, Furēte Masukarēru)
Voiced by: Riho Sugiyama
Prohelia Zutazutsky (プロヘリヤ・ズタズタスキー, Puroheriya Zutazutasukī)
Voiced by: Aoi Yūki

== Media ==
=== Light novel ===
Written by Kotei Kobayashi and illustrated by Riichu, SB Creative began publishing the series on January 11, 2020. As of December 2025, 14 volumes have been released.

In August 2021, Yen Press announced that they licensed the series for English publication.

==== Volumes ====
| No. | Original release date | Original ISBN | English release date | English ISBN |
|---|---|---|---|---|
| 1 | January 11, 2020 | 978-4-8156-0465-3 | April 19, 2022 | 978-1-9753-3949-4 |
Chapter 0: Prologue; Chapter 1: The Shut-In Vampire Princess Goes Out; Chapter 2: Komari's Charming Comrades; Chapter 2.5: A Fox Face in the Dead of Night; Chapter 3: A Mutinous Uprising; Chapter 3.5: Inverse Moon; Chapter 4: Party Crasher; Chapter 5: The Darkness of the Shut-In Vampire Princess; Chapter 6: Millicent Bluenight; Chapter 7: Blood Curse; Chapter 0: Epilogue
| 2 | May 14, 2020 | 978-4-8156-0551-3 | September 20, 2022 | 978-1-9753-3951-7 |
Chapter 0: Prologue; Chapter 1: Sakuna Memoir and the Seven Crimson Lords; Chapter 1.5: A Hundred Komaris; Chapter 2: A Round Table Full of Weirdos; Chapter 2.5: Suspicion Befalls the Sixth Unit; Chapter 3: Web of Memories in a Sea of Stars; Chapter 3.5: Before the Match; Chapter 4: Scarlet Stage; Chapter 5: The Wheels of Asterism; Chapter 0: Epilogue
| 3 | September 11, 2020 | 978-4-8156-0743-2 | December 13, 2022 | 978-1-9753-3953-1 |
Chapter 0: Prologue; Chapter 1: Warblade Tea Party; Chapter 2: Peace Spirit Tea Party; Chapter 2.5: Nelia Cunningham's Ambitions; Chapter 3: Behold, World!; Chapter 4: The Aruka Kingdom Princess; Chapter 4.5: Lurking in the Shadows; Chapter 5: The Paradise Where Dreams Collapse; Chapter 6: Diverse Divide; Chapter 7: Golden World; Chapter 0: Epilogue
| 4 | January 14, 2021 | 978-4-8156-0890-3 | April 18, 2023 | 978-1-9753-3955-5 |
Chapter 0: Prologue; Chapter 1: The Six Valkyries; Chapter 2: The Cherry-Tinted City Under the Clear Moon; Chapter 3: Amatsu versus Reigetsu; Chapter 4: Endless Night at the Fall Festival; Chapter 5: Mayhem at the Eastern Capital; Chapter 6: Waving Moment; Chapter 0: Epilogue; Chapter ∞: Epilogue - Backstage
| 5 | May 13, 2021 | 978-4-8156-0985-6 | September 19, 2023 | 978-1-9753-7260-6 |
Chapter 0: Prologue; Chapter 1: The Vampire Princess of the Holy Paradise; Chapter 1.5: Predators Against the Imperial Capital; Chapter 2: The Day the Maid Vanished; Chapter 2.5: The Wanderer from the Netherworld; Chapter 3: God's Territory; Chapter 3.5: The Sun Sets on the Empire; Chapter 4: A Voice Echoes in the Land of Night; Chapter 5: The Shut-In Vampire Princess Stands on the Battlefield; Chapter 6: Pandora's Poison; Chapter 0: Epilogue
| 6 | September 14, 2021 | 978-4-8156-1203-0 | February 20, 2024 | 978-1-9753-7964-3 |
Chapter 0: Prologue; Chapter 0.5: The Shadow of a Star and a Piece of the Moon; Chapter 1: The Seventh Unit's Biggest Fan; Chapter 1.5: Distant Memories; Chapter 2: Relaxing at the Hot Springs; Chapter 2.5: Lingzi Ailan and the Vampires; Chapter 3: Serial Murder Mystery; Chapter 4: The Black Assassin and the Gift from the Netherworld; Chapter 4.5: Death Master; Chapter 0: Epilogue
| 7 | January 14, 2022 | 978-4-8156-1378-5 | June 18, 2024 | 978-1-9753-7966-7 |
Chapter 0: Prologue; Chapter 1: Is This Love?; Chapter 2: War and Wedding Bells; Chapter 3: To Be a Tianzi; Chapter 4: The Late Monarch's Guidance; Chapter 0: Epilogue
| 8 | May 13, 2022 | 978-4-8156-1642-7 | October 15, 2024 | 978-1-9753-7968-1 |
Chapter 0: Prologue; Chapter 1: The Unwonted Principles of the World; Chapter 1.5: Polemic on the Other Side; Chapter 2: The Maid and the Shrine Maiden; Chapter 2.5: The Whereabouts of the Upended Moon; Chapter 3: Journey into the Unknown; Chapter 4: Homeland; Chapter 5: Ever Since the Day of Thunder; Chapter 5.5: Bolt
| 9 | October 14, 2022 | 978-4-8156-1643-4 | July 15, 2025 | 978-1-9753-7970-4 |
Chapter 6: The Terrorists' Endgame; Chapter 6.5: To the South; Chapter 7: Gold Rush!; Chapter 8: Star Cave Beasts; Chapter 9: Behind the Wickedness; Chapter 10: The Great Spelunking; Chapter 11: The Euphony of Corpses; Chapter 12: Sunny World; Chapter 12.5: Moon, Stars, and Blood
| 10 | January 14, 2023 | 978-4-8156-1910-7 | February 10, 2026 | 978-1-9753-7972-8 |
Chapter 13: The Foolish Observatory; Chapter 14: The Netherworld Squirms; Chapter 15: God's Domain, Again; Chapter 16: Vampire Princess Under Siege; Chapter 16.5: Storytime; Chapter 17: Terrorists on the Gallows; Chapter 17.5: Silver Plate Order; Chapter 18: Metamorphosis; Chapter 19: Philosophy of Eternity; Chapter 0: Epilogue
| 11 | May 15, 2023 | 978-4-8156-2137-7 | September 8, 2026 | 979-8-8554-0654-2 |
Chapter 0: Prologue; Chapter 1: The Resurrection of Leona Flatt; Chapter 2: The Blooming of Lingzi Ailan; Chapter 3: The Jaunt of Clenent DIV; Chapter 4: The Exploration of Sakuna Memoir; Chapter 0: Epilogue
| 12 | October 14, 2023 | 978-4-8156-2138-4 | January 12, 2027 | 979-8-8554-0656-6 |
| 13 | March 15, 2024 | 978-4-8156-2139-1 | — | — |
| 14 | December 13, 2025 | 978-4-8156-3811-5 | — | — |

=== Manga ===
A manga adaptation, illustrated by the novel's illustrator Riichu, was serialized in Square Enix's Monthly Big Gangan magazine from December 25, 2021, to April 25, 2025. As of December 2025, the series' individual chapters have been collected in four tankōbon volumes.

The manga adaptation is published in English on Square Enix's Manga Up! app and website.

==== Volumes ====
| No. | Japanese release date | Japanese ISBN |
|---|---|---|
| 1 | June 23, 2022 | 978-4-7575-7986-6 |
| 2 | January 25, 2023 | 978-4-7575-8363-4 |
| 3 | November 25, 2023 | 978-4-7575-8919-3 |
| 4 | December 25, 2025 | 978-4-301-00023-5 |

=== Anime ===
An anime television series adaptation was announced at the "GA Fes 2023" livestream on January 5, 2023. It is produced by Project No.9 and directed by Tatsuma Minamikawa, with scripts supervised by Keiichirō Ōchi, characters designed by Tomoyuki Shitaya, and music composed by Go Shiina. The series aired from October 7 to December 30, 2023, on Tokyo MX and other networks. The opening theme is "Red Liberation" by fripSide, while the ending theme is "Nemurenai" (眠れない) by Miminari feat. Tomori Kusunoki.

Sentai Filmworks has licensed the series outside of Asia. Nada Holdings / Remow licensed the series in Asia-Pacific. In March 2024, Hidive announced an English dub for the series, which will premiere its first two episodes at Anime Boston on March 29 before releasing on the platform starting on April 15.

==== Episodes ====
| No. | Title | Directed by | Written by | Storyboarded by | Original release date |
|---|---|---|---|---|---|
| 1 | "The Shut-in Vampire Goes Outside"; Transliteration: "Hikikomori Kyūketsuki, Soto ni Deru" (Japanese: 引きこもり吸血鬼、外に出る) | Kazuo Nogami | Keiichirō Ōchi | Tatsuma Minamikawa | October 7, 2023 |
| 2 | "A Sudden Insurrection"; Transliteration: "Gekokujō, Boppatsu" (Japanese: 下剋上、勃発) | Kiyotaka Takezawa | Keiichirō Ōchi | Hiroaki Takagi | October 14, 2023 |
| 3 | "The Darkness of the Shut-in Vampire Princess"; Transliteration: "Hikikomori Kyūketsuki no Yami" (Japanese: ひきこもり吸血姫の闇) | Kōsuke Shimotori | Keiichirō Ōchi | Tatsuma Minamikawa | October 21, 2023 |
| 4 | "The Mercy of the Lonely Crimson"; Transliteration: "Kokō no Tomurai" (Japanese: 孤紅の恤) | Kentarō Tanaka | Keiichirō Ōchi | Hiroaki Takagi | October 28, 2023 |
| 5 | "Sakuna Memoir and the Seven Crimson Lords"; Transliteration: "Sakuna Memowāru to Shichiguten-tachi" (Japanese: サクナ・メモワールと七紅天たち) | Kazuo Nogami | Satoru Sugizawa | Hitomi Ezoe | November 4, 2023 |
| 6 | "A Roundtable of Lowlives"; Transliteration: "Kusemono Zoroi no Entaku Kaigi" (Japanese: 曲者ぞろいの円卓会議) | Ayumi Takagi | Keiichirō Ōchi | Hidetoshi Takahashi | November 11, 2023 |
| 7 | "The Scarlet Stage"; Transliteration: "Sukāretto Sutēji" (Japanese: スカーレット・ステージ) | Kentarō Tanaka | Satoru Sugizawa | Noriaki Saitō | November 18, 2023 |
| 8 | "Wheels of Asterism"; Transliteration: "Asuterizumu no Kaiten" (Japanese: アステリズムの廻転) | Kiyotaka Takezawa | Keiichirō Ōchi | Tsutomu Miyazawa | November 25, 2023 |
| 9 | "A Warblade Tea Party"; Transliteration: "Senryū Chakai" (Japanese: 翦劉茶会) | Kazuo Nogami | Keiichirō Ōchi | Noriaki Saitō | December 9, 2023 |
| 10 | "The Princess of Aruka Kingdom"; Transliteration: "Aruka Okoku no Ohimesama" (Japanese: アルカ王国のお姫様) | Ayumi Takagi | Satoru Sugizawa | Noriaki Saitō | December 16, 2023 |
| 11 | "The Dream-Crushing Paradise"; Transliteration: "Yume no Tsuieru Rakuen" (Japanese: 夢の潰える楽園) | Akari Ranzaki | Keiichirō Ōchi | Akari Ranzaki | December 23, 2023 |
| 12 | "A Golden World"; Transliteration: "Ōgon no Sekai" (Japanese: 黄金の世界) | Kentarō Tanaka | Keiichirō Ōchi | Tatsuma Minamikawa | December 30, 2023 |

== Reception ==
In the 2021 edition of Takarajimasha's annual light novel guide book Kono Light Novel ga Sugoi!, the novel series ranked 17th in the new work category.

Both the manga and anime have received generally mixed to negative reviews from critics. Demelza from Anime UK News liked the illustrations, while harshly criticizing the story and characters. Rebecca Silverman from Anime News Network liked the illustrations and thought the writing was "solid", while also criticizing the characters, especially Vill and Komari.

== See also ==
- Killed Again, Mr. Detective?, another light novel series illustrated by Riichu
