= Endo and Kobayashi Live! The Latest on Tsundere Villainess Lieselotte =

Japanese light novel series

- First light novel volume cover

ツンデレ悪役令嬢リーゼロッテと実況の遠藤くんと解説の小林さん (Tsundere Akuyaku Reijō Rīzerotte to Jikkyō no Endō-kun to Kaisetsu no Kobayashi-san)
- Genre: Drama; Fantasy; Romantic comedy
- Novel series
- Written by: Suzu Enoshima
- Published by: Shōsetsuka ni Narō; Kakuyomu
- Original run: August 11, 2018 – November 3, 2018
- Light novel
- Written by: Suzu Enoshima
- Illustrated by: Eihi
- Published by: Fujimi Shobo
- English publisher: NA: J-Novel Club
- Imprint: Kadokawa Books
- Original run: April 10, 2019 – August 9, 2019
- Volumes: 2 + 1 extra volume
- Manga
- Written by: Suzu Enoshima
- Illustrated by: Rumiwo Sakaki
- Published by: Enterbrain
- English publisher: NA: J-Novel Club
- Magazine: B's Log Comic
- Original run: June 5, 2019 – May 5, 2024
- Volumes: 7
- Anime television series
- Directed by: Fumihiro Yoshimura
- Produced by: Hiroyuki Aoi; Cao Cong; Noriok Fukui; Yoshinori Hasegawa; Airi Sawada; Sumio Udagawa; Ryouhei Yamashita; Yuuki Koshida
- Written by: Tomoko Konparu
- Music by: Tatsuhiko Saiki; Natsumi Tabuchi; Sayaka Aoki; Junko Nakajima; Kanade Sakuma
- Studio: Tezuka Productions
- Licensed by: Sentai Filmworks
- Original network: MBS, TBS, BS-TBS, AT-X
- Original run: January 7, 2023 – March 25, 2023
- Episodes: 12
- icon

Endo and Kobayashi Live! The Latest on Tsundere Villainess Lieselotte (ツンデレ悪役令嬢リーゼロッテと実況の遠藤くんと解説の小林さん, Tsundere Akuyaku Reijō Rīzerotte to Jikkyō no Endō-kun to Kaisetsu no Kobayashi-san), also known as Tsunlise (ツンリゼ) for short, is a Japanese fantasy light novel series written by Suzu Enoshima and illustrated by Eihi. It was serialized online between August and November 2018 on the user-generated novel publishing website Shōsetsuka ni Narō, and all 47 chapters were later released on the Kakuyomu website in December 2019. It was later acquired by Fujimi Shobo, who have published two volumes between April and August 2019 under their Kadokawa Books imprint. The light novel is licensed in North America by J-Novel Club. A manga adaptation with art by Rumiwo Sakaki was serialized in Enterbrain's josei manga magazine B's Log Comic from June 2019 to May 2024 and was collected in seven tankōbon volumes. An anime television series adaptation produced by Tezuka Productions aired from January to March 2023.

== Plot ==
Broadcasting club members Aoto Endo and Shihono Kobayashi decide to play A Magical Romance, an otome game following the adventures of the protagonist Fiene as she romances her capture targets while fighting against the villainess, Lieselotte Riefenstahl, who is eventually consumed by darkness and tragedy in all of the game's routes. Aoto, having read the game's supplementary material, believes Lieselotte to be misunderstood, claiming she is instead a tsundere that has trouble expressing her feelings. Aoto and Shihono play the game while each providing color and play-by-play commentary respectively, only for Prince Siegwald Fitzenhagen, Lieselotte's fiancé, to hear their words and interpret them as the word of god. As Aoto and Shihono continue providing commentary on Lieselotte, Siegwald begins understanding her feelings and thus avoiding the dark fate she faces as the misunderstood villainess, leading to drastic changes to the fate of their world.

== Characters ==
Lieselotte Riefenstahl (リーゼロッテ・リーフェンシュタール, Rīzerotte Rīfenshutāru)
Voiced by: Tomori Kusunoki
Lieselotte, or "Liese," is the high-ranking aristocratic villainess of the otome game A Magical Romance and a tsundere. She is engaged to Prince Siegwald "Sieg" Fitzenhagen and kept from succumbing to her destined fate thanks to Shihono and Aoto coaching Sieg, thus causing him to pay more attention and attempt to understand her inability to communicate.
Siegwald Fitzenhagen (ジークヴァルト・フィッツェンハーゲン, Jīkuvaruto Fittsuenhāgen)

Voiced by: Yuichi Nakamura
Siegwald, or "Sieg," is the "main" capture target of the otome game, the crown prince of the Kingdom of Fitzenhagen, and the fiancé of Lieselotte. He breaks the plot by being able to hear Aoto and Shihono tell him that Lieselotte does love him, but can't express her feelings properly, thus keeping him from focusing on the heroine. He is earnest and kind.
Aoto Endō (遠藤碧人, Endō Aoto)
Voiced by: Kaito Ishikawa
One of the two protagonists and narrators, Aoto is a modern Japanese high school student and the official "commentator" of A Magical Romance otome game. He joins the Broadcast Club after irreparably injuring his shoulder, thus making him unable to continue playing baseball. He has a crush on Shihono and agrees to play the otome game with her to practice his commentary for the Broadcast Club.
Shihono Kobayashi (小林詩帆乃, Kobayashi Shihono)
Voiced by: Kana Hanazawa
One of the two protagonists and narrators, Shihono is the official analyst of A Magical Romance otome game. She saves Aoto from being volunteered to play softball for their school by telling the class he has already joined the Broadcast Club. She is very enthusiastic about the game and Lieselotte Riefenstahl's survival/happy ending therein. She convinces Aoto to give the game a try by saying he can practice his commentary as if he were watching a sporting match.
Fiene (フィーネ, Fīne)
Voiced by: Miyu Tomita
Originally the heroine of her otome game world, a "commoner" with magical abilities. However, because Sieg has been advised by Aoto and Shihono about Lieselotte's devotion to him, Fiene has been kept from falling into a romance with him. Some time after Fiene has built a friendship with Liese, Sieg, and Baldur, she is informed of her important role in the future, which Sieg learns from the commentators. It is eventually revealed that her father was August Riefenstahl (Liese's uncle), who passed before her birth, and her mother's family is a prestigious one in the Marschner Duchy.
Baldur Riefenstahl (バルドゥール・リーフェンシュタール, Barudūru Rīfenshutāru)
Voiced by: Tomokazu Sugita
Baldur is a capture target, as well as the cousin to Lieselotte Riefenstahl. He is the second character Aoto and Shihono try to change the fate of. He is in love with Fiene and devotes himself to protecting her from harm.
Artur Richter (アルトゥル・リヒター, Aruturu Rihitā)
Voiced by: Ryōta Ōsaka
Another capture target, Artur is an active priest of the Church despite still being a student at the Magic Academy. He is away on a mission from the Church an shows up later in the game as a magical healer. He is a bit of a playboy.
Fabian Oldenburg (ファビアン・オルテンブルク, Fabian Orutenburuku)
Voiced by: Shun Horie
Fabian is a capture target and a child prodigy. Despite his young age, an exception was made for him to attend the Magic Academy and he is studying how to control his overwhelming magical powers. He has an aversion to adult men.
Leon Schache (レオン・シャッヘ, Reon Shahhe)
Voiced by: Taku Yashiro
The final capture target, Leon, is a professor at the Magic Academy. He is secretly a sadistic savant of magic but he comes across as unremarkable and avoids others.

== Media ==
=== Light novel ===
The series by Suzu Enoshima, originally serialized on the user-generated novel publishing website Shōsetsuka ni Narō from August 11 to November 3, 2018, was later made available on Kakuyomu in December 2019. It was also later acquired by Fujimi Shobo, who have published two light novel volumes with illustrations by Eihi between April 10 and August 9, 2019, under their Kadokawa Books imprint. An extra volume was released on December 9, 2022. In September 2021, J-Novel Club announced that they had licensed the light novel in North America, and they released it digitally from December 13, 2021, to July 7, 2023.

No.	Original release date	Original ISBN	English release date	English ISBN
1	April 10, 2019	978-4-04-073051-6	December 13, 2021	978-1-7183-0290-7
2	August 9, 2019	978-4-04-073054-7	February 14, 2022	978-1-7183-0292-1
EX	December 9, 2022	978-4-04-074696-8	July 7, 2023	978-1-7183-0414-7

=== Manga ===
A manga adaptation with art by Rumiwo Sakaki has been serialized in Enterbrain's josei manga magazine B's Log Comic from June 5, 2019, to May 5, 2024. It was collected in seven tankōbon volumes, released from December 28, 2019, to August 30, 2024. The manga was canceled on September 4, 2024, due to the lack of editing and communication skills of the magazine's editorial staff, which led to Enoshima terminating the licensing contract. In January 2023, J-Novel Club announced that they had also licensed the manga, and they released it digitally from April 19, 2023, to May 7, 2025.

No.	Original release date	Original ISBN	English release date	English ISBN
1	December 28, 2019	978-4-0473-5873-7	April 19, 2023	978-1-7183-0416-1
2	July 31, 2020	978-4-0473-6191-1	June 14, 2023	978-1-7183-0417-8
3	May 1, 2021	978-4-0473-6568-1	July 14, 2023	978-1-7183-0418-5
4	December 27, 2021	978-4-0473-6884-2	October 9, 2023	978-1-7183-0419-2
5	August 1, 2022	978-4-0473-7121-7; 978-4-0473-7122-4 (SE)	December 22, 2023	978-1-7183-0420-8
6	February 1, 2023	978-4-0473-7354-9	March 21, 2024	978-1-7183-0421-5
7	August 30, 2024	978-4-0473-8126-1	May 7, 2025	978-1-7183-0422-2

=== Anime ===
On December 24, 2021, an anime adaptation was announced. It was later confirmed to be a television series adaptation produced by Tezuka Productions and directed by Fumihiro Yoshimura, with Tomoko Konparu oversees the series' scripts, Miyuki Katayama designed the characters, and Tatsuhiko Saiki, Natsumi Tabuchi, Sayaka Aoki, Junko Nakajima, and Kanade Sakuma composed the music. It aired from January 7 to March 25, 2023, on the Animeism programming block on MBS and other affiliates. The opening theme song is "Ibitsu na Kotoba" (イビツナコトバ; "Distorted Words") by Dazbee, while the ending theme song is "Like a Flower" (花のように, Hana no Yō ni) by Anna. At Anime NYC 2022, Sentai Filmworks announced that they licensed the series, and streamed it on Hidive.

==== Episodes ====
No.	Title	Directed by (Note: Information is taken from the ending credits of each episode.)	Written by	Storyboarded by	Original release date
1	"The Tsundere, the Prince, and the Voices of the Gods"; Transliteration: "Tsundere to Ōji to Ten no Koe" (Japanese: ツンデレと王子と天の声)	Masami Hata	Tomoko Konparu	Fumihiro Yoshimura	January 7, 2023 (Note: This episode aired at 2:25 a.m. JST, 30 minutes after the original air time.)
Shihono Kobayashi and Aoto Endo are high school students and part of the Broadcast Club. With free time on their hands, Kobayashi suggests she and Endo play one of her favorite games, an otome game called "A Magical Romance." Endo agrees because he has a crush on her. Kobayashi praises the game's villainess, Lieselotte "Liese" Riefenstahl, and hates her scripted tragic end. While playing, they realize the main capture target, Prince Siegwald "Sieg" Fitzenhagen, can hear them and thinks they're gods. More capture targets--Professor Leon Schache and Fabian Oltenburg--are introduced. Kobayashi and Endo decide to try and lead Liese to a happy end.
2	"The Wand, Maxed Out, and Favored by the Gods"; Transliteration: "Tsue to Kansuto to Kami no Chōai" (Japanese: 杖とカンストと神の寵愛)	Fumio Maezono	Tomoko Konparu	Fumihiro Yoshimura	January 14, 2023
Endo and Kobayashi are determined to give all the game's characters a perfect happy ending. They learn they can bestow their favor on a character of their choice: Kobayashi chooses Liese and Endo chooses Liese's cousin and another capture target, Baldur "Bal" Riefenstahl. The final capture target, Artur Richter, finally arrives and learns how special Fiene, the heroine, really is. Meanwhile, Kobayashi and Endo continue to be wingmen for Sieg and Liese.
3	"The Ribbon, the Upperclassman, and Feelings of Love"; Transliteration: "Ribon to Senpai to Koigokoro" (Japanese: リボンと先輩と恋心)	Isamu Yamaguchi; Fumihiro Yoshimura	Mayumi Morita	Hitoyuki Matsui	January 21, 2023
The reason Endo joined the Broadcast Club and how he met Kobayashi is revealed. It also turns out that the game won't load unless both of them are present, meaning, additionally, that there are no do-overs if they mess things up. Liese and Fiene have a brief misunderstanding that results in Sieg thinking Liese is even cuter. Fiene and Bal get closer while fighting monsters in the forest, but Fiene gets embarrassed and runs off. Despite Sieg falling for Liese, she has trouble believing it, and the Witch of Yore (the game's true villain) begins interfering. Elsewhere in Japan, a man has trouble playing the game.
4	"The Summer, Going Home, and Missing You"; Transliteration: "Natsu to Kisei to Aitai Kimochi" (Japanese: 夏と帰省と会いたい気持ち)	Takuo Suzuki	Hiroko Fukuda	Tomio Yamauchi	January 28, 2023
Sieg helps Liese get her feelings across to Fiene, and Fiene stays with her over their school's summer break. After their discussion in the forest, Fiene begins avoiding Bal. Without Sieg around during the break, Kobayashi and Endo lament there is no one to translate Liese's tsundere-speak to Fiene (though things turn out fine in the end). Sieg becomes depressed he can't see Liese and is encouraged to visit her by Artur. Kobayashi and Endo are thrilled to be able to talk to someone again. Later on, someone attacks the gates of the Riefenstahl's summer castle.
5	"Mother and Daughter, Sisters, and a First Date"; Transliteration: "Oyako to Shimai to Hatsu Dēto" (Japanese: 母娘と姉妹と初デート)	Fumio Maezono	Mayumi Morita	Masaharu Tomoda; Fumihiro Yoshimura	February 4, 2023
The "attacker" turns out to be Fiene's mother, Elizabeth Marschner, who thought Fiene was being bullied and held captive. Fiene's lineage is revealed, and as a result she is adopted as Liese's sister, becoming the rightful heir to House Riefenstahl. Kobayashi and Endo celebrate by going on a date where they run into the man who was trying to play the game, Kirise Kuon, a famous actor. He seems suspicious and like he has something to do with the game. Liese gives Sieg a gift before he and Artur depart.
6	"A Nightmare, the Coward, and the Princess Carry"; Transliteration: "Akumu to Hetare to Hime Dakko" (Japanese: 悪夢とヘタレと姫抱っこ)	Yuri Uema	Hiroko Fukuda	Fumihiro Yoshimura	February 11, 2023
The new semester at Magic Academy begins, but something is still lurking behind the scenes trying to get to Liese. Fiene and Bal are still feeling awkward around each other, and Liese helps them work it out. Fiene begins to hear Endo and Kobayashi, as well, and they are thrilled with her and Bal's relationship development. When Liese begins to succumb to the Witch of Yore, she hears Endo and Kobayashi rooting for her, and the other characters learn of the Witch.
7	"The Prophesy, the Little Boy, and the Live Broadcast"; Transliteration: "Shintaku to Shota to Namahōsō" (Japanese: 神託とショタと生放送)	Shintarō Matsui	Mayumi Morita	Hiroshi Kotaki	February 18, 2023
Endo and Kobayashi continue encouraging Sieg to make sure Liese knows he loves her. At the beginning of their own second semester, they discuss their strategy to deal with the Witch. Sieg and Fiene begin recruiting allies to save Liese. Liese gets close to Fabian, the young magical prodigy. In the real world, Endo and Kobayashi perform live commentary of a basketball game for the student body. Fiene and Baldur meet with Marquis Riefenstahl and Elizabeth offers her own aid for the coming battle.
8	"Master and Disciple, the Mask, and Tsundereally-Pissed"; Transliteration: "Shitei to Kamen to Tsungire Reijō" (Japanese: 師弟と仮面とツンギレ令嬢)	Takuo Suzuki	Hiroko Fukuda	Yō Akatsuki; Daigo Kinoshita	February 25, 2023
The Witch of Yore continues to pursue Liese by making her doubt Sieg's love while Sieg keeps reaffirming his affection. Elizabeth, who has known Professor Leon since he was a child, speaks to him about helping defeat the Witch. Liese begins avoiding Sieg and he plots with the others about how to combat it. She still believes his affection is pity. Endo and Kobayashi further realize their own feelings for each other, though nothing comes of it yet.
9	"The Dress, the School Festival, and Overflowing Emotions"; Transliteration: "Doresu to Bunkasai to Afureru Omoi" (Japanese: ドレスと文化祭とあふれる想い)	Shintarō Matsui	Mayumi Morita	Daiki Maezawa	March 4, 2023
Kobayashi is made the new president of the Broadcast Club after the third-years graduate. They stage a dramatic reenactment of Sieg and Liese's confession scene for the school festival, though it is rejected by the Former President for being too sappy and another script is chosen. Meanwhile, the game's characters prep for the ball and confrontation with the Witch. After their performance at the festival, Kobayashi's sister, Chiyono, visits and attempts to get Endo to confess his feelings to her sister. Kirise spies on them from a distance.
10	"The Lirene Flower, the Ball, and the Witch"; Transliteration: "Rena no Hana to Budōkai to Majo" (Japanese: レナの花と舞踏会と魔女)	Fumio Maezono	Hiroko Fukuda	Fumihiro Yoshimura	March 11, 2023 (Note: This episode aired at 3:20 a.m. JST, 1 hour and 25 minutes after the original air time due to the WBC Baseball coverage extension.)
The Academy's Gratitude Festival begins, signaling the Witch of Yore's impending resurrection, and Kobayashi goes all out with pre-game prep. They commentate on the ball's proceedings, Liese drops jaws with her dignified Royal Guard apparel, and Fiene has doubts about her dancing. Just as Endo and Kobayashi are lamenting that the game is almost over, the tv screen goes black. In the game, the Witch makes her move. Leon decides to help after all, completing the reverse harem ending requirements, but things don't go as planned.
11	"The Witch, the Goddess, and the Creation Myth"; Transliteration: "Majo to Megami to Hajimari no Shinwa" (Japanese: 魔女と女神と始まりの神話)	Takuo Suzuki	Tomoko Konparu	Daigo Kinoshita	March 18, 2023 (Note: This episode aired at 2:00 a.m. JST, 5 minutes after the original air time.)
Liese is consumed by the Witch and the others fight to bring her back, Kobayashi and Endo included. With the power of love, the Witch is defeated, revealing that she is actually the game's true goddess, Lirenna, who succumbed to rage and loneliness after losing her partner, Kuon. Lirenna apologizes to Liese for trying to possess her and tells her story. Kuon's one-sided obsession with Eve, one of their first created people, drove him to madness, and he killed Adam to have her to himself. He was blasted into another world (Japan) and possessed the body of Kirise. The truth of the link between the game world and Japan is revealed. Sieg and Liese agree to marry sooner rather than later, and someone kidnaps Chiyono.
12	"The Best Happy End to End All Happy Ends!"; Transliteration: "Saikō o Koeta Saikō no Happī Endo!" (Japanese: 最高を超えた最高のハッピーエンド！)	Fumihiro Yoshimura	Tomoko Konparu	Fumihiro Yoshimura	March 25, 2023
Lirenna explains to Kobayashi and Endo that Kuon kidnapped Chiyono and is likely trying to use her as a vessel for Eve's soul, then blesses them to help them find Kuon and stop him. Endo and Kobayashi head to Chiyono and Kirise's university and run into trouble. Everyone in the game world tries to help from the other side while Kuon attempts to manipulate Kobayashi, but she is saved by Liese. Liese tells Kuon off and encourages Endo to confess his feelings, resulting in Kobayashi and Endo finally becoming a couple. Later, they bid farewell to Sieg and the others with the hope they'll be able to speak again in the future. On Sieg and Liese's wedding day, Lirenna incarnates avatars of Endo and Kobayashi into their world so they can attend the wedding.

== Reception ==
The series had over 500,000 copies in circulation by December 2021.
