= Therefore, First Love Was Proven =

Japanese light novel series

- First light novel volume cover

デルタとガンマの理学部ノート (Deruta to Ganma no Rigakubu Nōto)
- Genre: Mystery
- Light novel
- Written by: Takuma Sakai
- Illustrated by: Asagi Tōsaka
- Published by: ASCII Media Works
- English publisher: NA: Yen Press
- Imprint: Dengeki Bunko
- Original run: November 8, 2024 – present
- Volumes: 4
- Manga
- Written by: Takuma Sakai
- Illustrated by: Lap Tsutsumi
- Published by: ASCII Media Works
- Imprint: Dengeki Comics NEXT
- Magazine: Comic Dengeki Daioh "g"
- Original run: April 27, 2026 – present
- Volumes: 1
- Anime

Therefore, First Love Was Proven (Japanese: デルタとガンマの理学部ノート, Hepburn: Deruta to Ganma no Rigakubu Nōto; "The Science Notes by Delta and Gamma") is a Japanese light novel series written by Takuma Sakai and illustrated by Asagi Tōsaka. It began publication under ASCII Media Works' Dengeki Bunko imprint in November 2024, with four volumes released as of October 2026. A manga adaptation illustrated by Lap Tsutsumi began serialization in ASCII Media Works' Comic Dengeki Daioh "g" magazine in April 2026 and has been compiled into a single tankōbon volume as of October 2026. An anime adaptation has been announced.

== Plot ==
The series follows Sho Izuta, a first-year student at Tsuna Nagai High School, a school noted for its focus on the sciences. He is also aiming to revitalize the school's Biology Club. He becomes involved with his classmate Rio Iwama after the two decide to investigate a mystery regarding a popular legend at school. According to legend, students who witness two cherry blossom trees near the school form a heart shape will become a couple. However, after reports spread that no one had seen the heart shape in recent times, the pair decide to investigate further. The two, along with the other members of the Biology Club, also become interested in the school's mysteries, aiming to solve them through the use of scientific methods.

== Characters ==
Sho Izuta (出田 樟, Izuta Sho)
A first-year high school student who is interested in biology and plants. He has an introverted personality, but this begins to change after befriending Rio Iwama. He is nicknamed "Delta". He has been friends with Ryuichi since elementary school.
Rio Iwama (岩間 理桜, Iwama Rio)
A fellow member of the Biology Club. She is a popular and intelligent student who is interested in mysteries. She loves science to the point that she likes to use it in solving mysteries.
Ryuichi Mizusaki (水崎 隆一, Mizusaki Ryūichi)
Sho's childhood friend and a fellow member of the Biology Club. He is interested in chemistry. He and Sho were both members of the Chemistry Club when they were in junior high school.
Rei Kannabi (甘南備 麗, Kannabi Rei)
A student with a boyish appearance and a cool personality. She is interested in Japanese.
Aya Mikage (御影 綾, Mikage Aya)
A student skilled in mathematics, who has a calm personality.

== Media ==
=== Light novel ===
The series is written by Takuma Sakai and illustrated by Asagi Tōsaka, both of whom had previously worked together on the light novel series Butareba: The Story of a Man Turned into a Pig. It is published by ASCII Media Works under their Dengeki Bunko imprint. The first volume was released on November 8, 2024; four volumes have been released as of October 9, 2026.

In November 2026, Yen Press announced that they licensed the series for English publication.

No.	Title	Release date	ISBN
1	Yotte, Hatsukoi wa Shōmei Sareta. (よって、初恋は証明された。; Therefore, My First Love Was Proven.)	November 8, 2024	978-4-04-915646-1
2	Kono Seishun ni, Bekkai wa nai. (この青春に、別解はない。; There is No Alternative Solution to this Youth)	July 10, 2025	978-4-04-916228-8
3	Totte Oki no Ronri o, Kimi to. (とっておきの論理を、君と。; A Special Logic with You)	January 9, 2026	978-4-04-916716-0
4	Natsuzora ni, Michi o Sagashite. (夏空に、未知をさがして。; Searching for the Unknown in the Summer Sky)	October 9, 2026	978-4-04-952183-2

=== Manga ===
A manga adaptation illustrated by Lap Tsutsumi began serialization in ASCII Media Works' Comic Dengeki Daioh "g" magazine on April 27, 2026. The first tankōbon volume was released on October 27, 2026.

No.	Release date	ISBN
1	October 27, 2026	978-4-04-952481-9

=== Anime ===
An anime adaptation was announced during the "Dengeki Bunko Fall Festival Online 2026" livestream event on October 3, 2026.

== Reception ==
The series was included in the 2026 edition of Kono Light Novel ga Sugoi!, ranking sixth in the overall paperback category and third in the new release paperback category.

== See also ==
- Butareba: The Story of a Man Turned into a Pig, another light novel series with the same author and illustrator
