= Assassins Pride =

Japanese light novel series

- First light novel volume cover

アサシンズプライド (Asasinzu Puraido)
- Genre: Fantasy
- Light novel
- Written by: Kei Amagi
- Illustrated by: Nino Ninomoto
- Published by: Fujimi Shobo
- Imprint: Fujimi Fantasia Bunko
- Original run: January 20, 2016 – present
- Volumes: 13 (Note: + 2 short stories)
- Manga
- Written by: Kei Amagi
- Illustrated by: Yoshie Katō
- Published by: Shueisha
- Magazine: Ultra Jump
- Original run: October 19, 2017 – August 19, 2022
- Volumes: 10
- Anime television series
- Directed by: Kazuya Aiura
- Produced by: Gouta Aijima; Hideaki Miyamoto; Takema Okamura; Souji Miyagi; Shouta Watase; Yousuke Shimizu; Toshikatsu Saitou; Atsushi Tsunoda; Takumi Morii; Satsuki Utsumi; Tomokazu Iizumi (#1); Yoshiyuki Shioya (#1–4); Takashi Murakami (#2–4); Hiroo Saitou (#5–12); Yuuya Yoshida (#5–12)
- Written by: Deko Akao
- Music by: MONACA
- Studio: EMT Squared
- Licensed by: NA: Sentai Filmworks; UK: MVM Films
- Original network: AT-X, Tokyo MX, SUN, BS NTV
- Original run: October 10, 2019 – December 26, 2019
- Episodes: 12
- icon

Assassin's Pride (アサシンズプライド, Asasinzu Puraido) is a Japanese fantasy light novel series written by Kei Amagi and illustrated by Nino Ninomoto. Fujimi Shobo have published the series since January 20, 2016, under their Fujimi Fantasia Bunko imprint. A manga adaptation with art by Yoshie Katō was serialized in Shueisha's seinen manga magazine Ultra Jump from May 2017 to August 2022. An anime television series adaptation by EMT Squared aired from October to December 2019.

== Plot ==
Humanity has been brought to the edge of extinction and now exists solely in the last remaining city-state of Flandore, where individual city blocks are housed in separate glass domes. Travel between the domes is possible only via train lines running through glass tunnels. The world outside the domes has become one of eternal darkness and is completely infested with savage lycanthropes.

Within the domes, humanity is divided into the nobility and the commoner classes. Through their blood, members of noble families are able to manifest mana which grants them powerful superhuman abilities enabling them to fight and kill lycanthropes. Melida Angel was born to a noble father and a commoner mother but has never manifested mana and attends an elite academy to hone her skills with mana.

== Characters ==
=== House Angel ===
Kufa Vampir (クーファ=ヴァンピール, Kūfa Vanpīru)
Voiced by: Yūki Ono (Japanese); Gabriel Regojo (English)
Kufa is a member of the guild White Night, which he and Black Madia belong to. Kufa was given a job to be Melida's tutor, with the secret task of assassinating her if he found out she wasn't the proper heir to the Angel family. Ultimately, however, he goes against his orders and transfers some of his mana to her, developing a close mentor-pupil bond with Melida. He is half-human and half-vampire, the strongest of the Vampires. His mana class is Samurai.
Melida Angel (メリダ=アンジェル, Merida Anjeru)
Voiced by: Tomori Kusunoki (Japanese); Brittney Karbowski (English)
The heiress of the noble house Angel, a family of paladins. However, despite already being thirteen, she still hadn't awakened her mana yet. Unbeknownst to her, this might stem from her perhaps not being her noble father's biological daughter, having instead been born from her late mother's affair. She finally obtains mana after Kufa gives her some of his own, allowing her to use his Samurai class of magic. She develops strong feelings for Kufa, to the point where even after learning his true nature as a Vampire she accepts him and promises to keep his secret.
Elise Angel (エリーゼ=アンジェル, Erīze Anjeru)
Voiced by: Yui Ishikawa (Japanese); Juliet Simmons (English)
Melida's cousin, who unlike her was recognized as a prodigy from an early age. While she and Melida have a very close, sisterly relationship, it was initially strained by their opposing status. However, following the Luna Lumiere Selection tournament, they made up and formed a unit together. Also, despite her strength, she is actually rather shy and easily frightened. Her mana class is Paladin.
Rosetti Pricket (ロゼッティ=プリケット, Rozetti Puriketto)
Voiced by: Marina Yabūchi (Japanese); Avery Smithhart (English)
Elise's private tutor. Though a commoner, she was born with mana and became a noble by rising through the ranks. She quickly develops a crush on Kufa and attempts to marry him to get out of an arranged marriage by her adoptive father, though he usually shrugs off her advances. It is eventually revealed that she and Kufa are foster siblings, and that he turned her into a vampire after she was mortally injured during a lycanthrope attack, though he sealed away her memories to allow her to live a normal life. Her mana class is Maiden.

=== St. Friedeswiede ===
Nerva Martillo (ネルヴァ=マルティーリョ, Neruva Marutīryo)
Voiced by: Ayane Sakura (Japanese); Alyssa Marek (English)
The leader of a group of bullies at the St. Friedeswiede Girls Academy, who constantly mocked Melida over her lack of mana. She later made amends with Melida by becoming her teammate for the Luna Lumiere Selection tournament. Her mana class is a Gladiator.
Shenfa Zwitoque (シェンファ=ツヴィトーク, Shenfa Tsuvitōku)
Voiced by: Asami Seto (Japanese); Patricia Duran (English)
Shenfa is a student who attends St. Friedeswiede Girls Academy. She was the precedent "Luna Lumiere" for winning the Luna Lumiere Selection tournament.

=== St. d'Autriche ===
Mule la More (ミュール=ラ・モール, Myūru Ra Mōru)
Voiced by: Maaya Uchida (Japanese); Elissa Cuellar (English)
Mule la More is a member of House La More, a family of Diabolos. Her class lets her absorb the mana of her opponents. She attends St. d'Autriche Girls Academy.
Salacha Schicksal (サラシャ=シクザール, Sarasha Shikuzāru)
Voiced by: Azumi Waki (Japanese); Cat Thomas (English)
Salacha often called Sala, is a student who attends St. d'Autriche Girls Academy and is a friend of Mule's. She and Keira participated in the Luna Lumiere Selection tournament. Her class is Dragoon.
Keira Espada (キーラ=エスパーダ, Kīra Esupāda)
Voiced by: Kiyono Yasuno (Japanese); Christie Guidry (English)
Keira is a student who attends St. d'Autriche Girls Academy. She and Salacha participated in the Luna Lumiere Selection tournament and won.

=== Others ===
Father (オヤジ, Oyaji)
Voiced by: Toshiyuki Morikawa (Japanese); John Gremillion (English)
Father is the leader of the guild White Night, which Kufa and Black Madia are members of.
William Gin (ウィリアム・ジン, Wiriamu Jin)
Voiced by: Tatsuhisa Suzuki (Japanese); Michael Wronski (English)
William is a member of a guild called Grimfice.
Black Madia (ブラック=マディア, Burakku Madia)
Voiced by: Sora Tokui (Japanese); Luci Christian (English)
Black Madia is a member of the same guild as Kufa. Her mana class is a Clown, the ability to copy any of the other classes. After the Luna Lumiere Selection tournament ended abruptly, she changes her alias to "Laque" and became a teacher at St. Friedeswiede.
Blosum Pricket (ブロサム=プリケト, Burosamu Puriketo)
Voiced by: Hōchū Ōtsuka
Blosum Pricket is the Marquis of the town of Shangarta. He is an engineer by trade, but takes in the homeless town children and raises them as his own, such as Rosetti.
Serge Schiksal (セルジュ・シクサル, Seruju Shikuzāru)
Voiced by: Yoshimasa Hosoya
Salacha's older brother.

== Media ==
=== Light novel ===
Assassins Pride is written by Kei Amagi and illustrated by Nino Ninomoto. Fujimi Shobo have published thirteen tankōbon volumes since January 20, 2016, under their Fujimi Fantasia Bunko imprint. Two short stories have been published, with the first being released on February 20, 2018, and the second on December 20, 2019.

No.	Release date	ISBN
1	January 20, 2016	978-4-04-070817-1
2	April 20, 2016	978-4-04-070818-8
3	July 20, 2016	978-4-04-070972-7
4	November 19, 2016	978-4-04-070973-4
5	February 18, 2017	978-4-04-072227-6
6	June 20, 2017	978-4-04-072230-6
7	October 20, 2017	978-4-04-072484-3
SG	February 20, 2018	978-4-04-072651-9
8	August 18, 2018	978-4-04-072485-0
9	January 19, 2019	978-4-04-073003-5
10	June 20, 2019	978-4-04-073223-7
11	October 19, 2019	978-4-04-073224-4
SG 2	December 20, 2019	978-4-04-073225-1
12	June 19, 2020	978-4-04-073747-8
13	March 19, 2021	978-4-04-073748-5

=== Manga ===
A manga adaptation drawn by Yoshie Katō was serialized in Shueisha's seinen manga magazine Ultra Jump from May 2017 to August 2022. It has been collected in ten tankōbon volumes.

No.	Release date	ISBN
1	October 19, 2017	978-4-08-890776-5
2	April 19, 2018	978-4-08-891003-1
3	November 19, 2018	978-4-08-891130-4
4	June 19, 2019	978-4-08-891260-8
5	November 19, 2019	978-4-08-891435-0
6	May 19, 2020	978-4-08-891591-3
7	January 19, 2021	978-4-08-891761-0
8	July 16, 2021	978-4-08-892037-5
9	February 18, 2022	978-4-08-892226-3
10	October 19, 2022	978-4-08-892477-9

=== Anime ===
An anime adaptation was announced during the Fantasia Bunko Dai Kanshasai 2018 event on October 21, 2018, later revealed to be a television series animated by EMT Squared. It is directed by Kazuya Aiura, with Deko Akao handled the series composition, and Maho Yoshikawa designed the characters. It aired from October 10 to December 26, 2019, on AT-X, Tokyo MX, SUN, and BS NTV. Run Girls, Run! performed the series' opening theme song "Share the light", while Tomori Kusunoki performed the series' ending theme song "Time of Foreigners" (異人たちの時間, Ijin-tachi no Jikan). Sentai Filmworks has licensed the series and streamed it on Hidive and Crunchyroll. The series ran for 12 episodes. On November 5, 2019, Hidive announced that the series will receive an English dub.
