= Tomori Kusunoki =

Japanese voice actress

- 楠木ともり
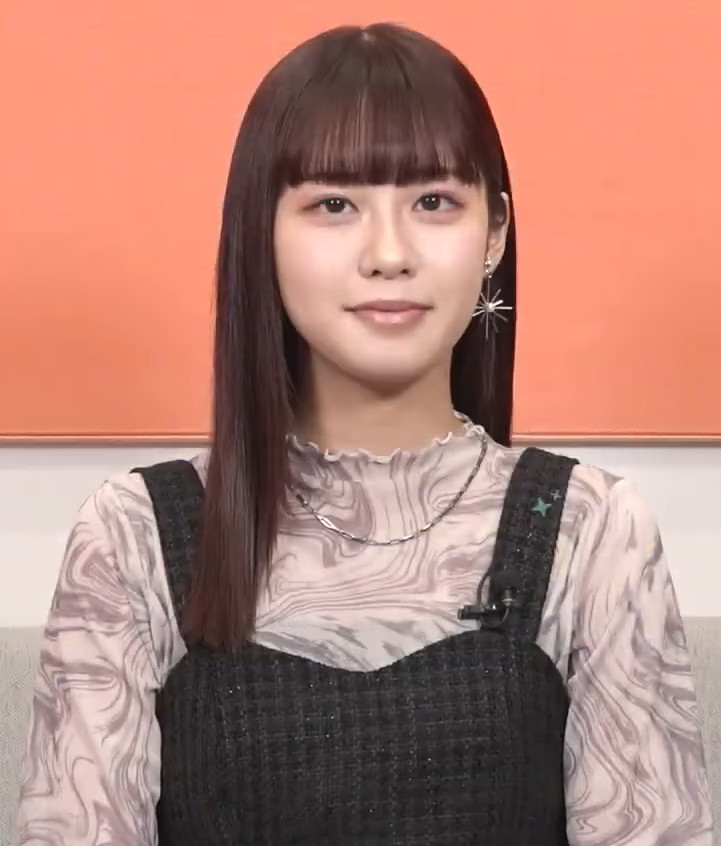
- Kusunoki in 2023
- Born: December 22, 1999 (age 26); Tokyo, Japan
- Occupations: Voice actress; singer-songwriter
- Years active: 2017–present
- Agent: Sony Music Artists
- Notable work: Kirara Fantasia as Kirara; Sword Art Online Alternative: Gun Gale Online as Llenn; The Misfit of Demon King Academy as Misha Necron; Deca-Dence as Natsume; Love Live! Nijigasaki High School Idol Club as Setsuna Yuki (2017–2023); Hatsune Miku: Colorful Stage! as Kanade Yoisaki; Chainsaw Man as Makima; Zom 100: Bucket List of the Dead as Shizuka Mikazuki
- Height: 155 cm (5 ft 1 in)
- Spouse: unnamed (m. 2025)
- Musical career
- Genres: J-Pop; Anison
- Instrument: Vocals
- Years active: 2020–present
- Label: Sacra Music (2020–present)
- Website: www.kusunokitomori.com

Tomori Kusunoki (楠木ともり, Kusunoki Tomori; born December 22, 1999) is a Japanese voice actress and singer who is currently affiliated with the Sony Music Artists agency. She made her voice acting debut in 2017 and in the same year, she was cast in her first main role as Kirara, the heroine of the Japanese mobile game Kirara Fantasia. She has also been cast in main roles in Märchen Mädchen, Love Live! Nijigasaki High School Idol Club, Sword Art Online Alternative: Gun Gale Online, Deca-Dence, The Misfit of Demon King Academy, Chainsaw Man, and Zom 100: Bucket List of the Dead. In 2019, she won the Best New Actress Award with Manaka Iwami, Coco Hayashi, Rina Honnizumi, and Kaede Hondo.

== Biography ==
Kusunoki was born in Tokyo on December 22, 1999. She became interested in entertainment at an early age; when she was three years old, she began taking piano lessons. She was also a member of her school's brass band during her junior high school years, and a member of a light music club during her high school years. She was also the student council president of her junior high school.

During her second year of junior high school, she became interested in anime. She particularly liked the series Kobato, and the portrayal of the lead character by Kana Hanazawa. This inspired her to become a voice actress. She decided to participate in an audition held by the agency Sony Music Artists. Because she felt that it would be difficult to pass the voice acting audition unless she had more experience, she instead auditioned as a singer. She ended up receiving the special prize at the competition.

Kusunoki made her debut as a voice actress in 2017, playing a background role in the anime series Eromanga Sensei. In June 2017, she was cast in her first main role as Kirara in the mobile game Kirara Fantasia. In 2018, she was cast as Hazuki Kagimura, the protagonist of the anime series Märchen Mädchen. She played the role of Llenn in the anime series Sword Art Online Alternative Gun Gale Online, for which she also sings the ending theme "To see the future". In the same year, she also became a part of Konami's media mix project called BandMeshi♪ (バンめし♪), with her voicing the guitarist Yokaze Tsuyuri. Later that year, she was cast as Setsuna Yūki in the Love Live! multimedia franchise. In 2019, she played the role of Melida Angel in the anime television series Assassins Pride; she also performed the series' ending theme "Ijin-tachi no Jikan" (異人たちの時間).

In 2020, Kusunoki made her debut as a solo artist under Sacra Music. Her first EP, "Hamidashimono", is the ending theme of The Misfit of Demon King Academy.

In 2021, Kusunoki was diagnosed with a congenital disorder that caused her to have a tendency to feel pain and numbness when performing dance and other strenuous activities that involve large movements. Because of this, Kusunoki had refrained from any activities that involve large movements in both her solo activities and any performances she participated in.

In 2022, it was confirmed that Kusunoki had been diagnosed with Ehlers–Danlos syndrome. Love Live!'s official website also announced her retirement of voicing Setsuna Yūki and Nana Nakagawa on March 31, 2023, due to the difficulty of taking part in stage performances. Coco Hayashi succeeded Kusunoki as Setsuna.

On January 1, 2026, Kusunoki announced her marriage to someone outside of the entertainment industry, who she "has been dating since [they] were students".

== Filmography ==
=== TV series ===
Title	Role	Remarks
2017
Eromanga Sensei	Middle school girl	Debut role
Senki Zesshou Symphogear AXZ	Girl	
Just Because!	Broadcasting club member	
Girls' Last Tour	Female student A	
Children of the Whales	Suzu	
2018
Märchen Mädchen	Hazuki Kagimura	First protagonist role, 2018–2019
Slow Start	Miki Tokura	
Time Bokan 24: The Villains' Strike Back	Chiyotake	
Sword Art Online Alternative Gun Gale Online	Karen "Llenn" Kohiruimaki	Protagonist
Kiratto Pri Chan	Hikari Momoyama, Bugcchu (Season 3), Orange girls, Fans, tea, girls, etc.	2018–2020
The Disastrous Life of Saiki K.	Maid	
Last Period	Oracle	
Anima Yell!	Kotetsu Tatejima	Main cast
The Girl in Twilight	Mayuki Tsukimi	
Release the Spyce	Ichiga Saiga	
2019
Forest of Piano	Emilia	
Actors: Songs Connection	Hina Koji	
Assassins Pride	Melida Angel	Heroine
Case File nº221: Kabukicho	Juli	2019–2020
2020
Yu-Gi-Oh! Sevens	Romin Kirishima	Main cast, 2020–2022
The Misfit of Demon King Academy	Misha Necron	Heroine, 2020–present
Deca-Dence	Natsume	Main cast
Love Live! Nijigasaki High School Idol Club	Setsuna Yuki	Main cast, 2020–2022
Wandering Witch: The Journey of Elaina	Selena	Episode 9
2021
Wonder Egg Priority	Neiru Aonuma, Airu Aonuma	Main cast
Kemono Jihen	Momoka Kaga	Episode 5–6
Seirei Gensouki: Spirit Chronicles	Latifa	Main cast, 2021–present
Muv-Luv Alternative	Sumika Kagami	Main cast, 2021–2022
My Senpai Is Annoying	Futaba Igarashi	Protagonist
Cinderella Nine: The Story Continues (special)	Yuzu Takanashi	Main cast
2022
Puchiseka	Yoisaki Kanade	Main cast
Aharen-san Is Indecipherable	Hanako Satō	Main cast
Prima Doll	Karasuba	Main cast
Yu-Gi-Oh! Go Rush!!	Rovian Kirishima	2022–2025, also reprised Romin for a cameo in episode 62
Chainsaw Man	Makima	Main cast
To Your Eternity 2nd Season	Hisame	
2023
Spy Classroom	Annette	Main cast
Nijiyon Animation	Setsuna Yuki	Main cast
Endo and Kobayashi Live! The Latest on Tsundere Villainess Lieselotte	Lieselotte Riefenstahl	Heroine
Reborn to Master the Blade: From Hero-King to Extraordinary Squire	Leone Olfa	
Magical Destroyers	Kyōtarō	
Zom 100: Bucket List of the Dead	Shizuka Mikazuki	Heroine
KamiErabi God.app	Iyo Funata	Main cast
Rail Romanesque 2	Mumumu	
The Vexations of a Shut-In Vampire Princess	Terakomari Gandesblood	Protagonist
Tearmoon Empire	Anne Littstein	
Butareba: The Story of a Man Turned into a Pig	Jess	Heroine
You Were Experienced, I Was Not: Our Dating Story	Akari Tanikita	
Dark Gathering	Yoko Nakiri	
2024
Chained Soldier	Aoba Wakura	
Mashle: The Divine Visionary Candidate Exam Arc	Tsurara Halestone	
The Unwanted Undead Adventurer	Laura Latour	
Unnamed Memory	Miralis	
Sword Art Online Alternative Gun Gale Online II	Karen "Llenn" Kohiruimaki	Protagonist
2025
Beheneko: The Elf-Girl's Cat Is Secretly an S-Ranked Monster!	Vulcan	
Witch Watch	Nemu Miyao	
Apocalypse Bringer Mynoghra	Atou	Heroine
Sword of the Demon Hunter: Kijin Gentōshō	Himawari	
Dusk Beyond the End of the World	Hakubo	
My Friend's Little Sister Has It In for Me!	Mashiro Tsukinomori	Heroine
2026
You and I Are Polar Opposites	Honda, Yeti	
Grow Up Show: Sunflower Circus	Aoi Yura	
2027
Blade & Bastard	Garbage	
TBA
Kusunoki's Flunking Her High School Glow-Up	Shizuka Kusunoki	Heroine

=== Films ===
Title	Role	Remarks
2019
City Hunter	Young Girl	
2020
High School Fleet: The Movie	Azumi "Azu" Abe	
2021
Tropical-Rouge! Precure the Movie: The Snow Princess and the Miraculous Ring!	Howan	
2025
Colorful Stage! The Movie: A Miku Who Can't Sing	Kanade Yoisaki	
Chainsaw Man – The Movie: Reze Arc	Makima	

=== Web animation ===
Title	Role	Remarks
2019
Shoujo☆Kageki All Starlight	Tamao Tomoe	
2022
Tiger & Bunny 2	Magical Cat / Lara Tsaikoskaya	
Bastard!! -Heavy Metal, Dark Fantasy-	Tia Noto Yoko	Main cast, 2022–2023
2023
Nightcord at 25:00. -Journey to Bloom "Self"	Kanade Yoisaki	Main cast

=== Original video animation ===
Year	Title	Role	Remarks
2019	Armagia Project	Tia	Included with Aramagia Project's 6th single's first press limited edition.
2023	Azur Lane: Queen's Orders	Seattle and Glasgo	

=== Video games ===
Year	Title	Role	Platform	Remarks
2017	Revolve-	May Shirayuki	Mobile	
2017–2021	Kirara Fantasia	Kirara, Kotetsu Tatejima, Miki Tokura	Mobile	Protagonist
2018	War of Brains	Imperial White Mage Rosa	Mobile	
2018	Sword Art Online: Fatal Bullet	Llenn	PS4, Xbox One, Windows, Switch	DLC
2018	Love Live! School Idol Festival	Setsuna Yūki	Mobile	
2018	Aurora Lemuria ~Hidden elements~	Masha	Mobile	
2018	Kuroneko project	Hibiki Oji/ Enigma Sunflower	Mobile	
2018	Onsen Musume	Ririn Otemachi	Mobile	
2018	White Cat Project	Piana Mayhern	Mobile	
2018	Hanazono Gakuen	Vivi	Mobile	
2018	Hortensia Saga -Ao no Kishidan-	Plenshell	Mobile	
2018	Shōjo Kageki Revue Starlight -Re LIVE-	Tamao Tomoe	Mobile	
2018	Vital Gear	Flavalette	Mobile	
2018	REversal Othellonia	Canary	Mobile	
2018	Destiny Child	Venus	Mobile	
2018	Stellar Girl	Polymer	Mobile	
2019	Non-Anthropology Academy -Extraordinary Ones-	Ittan-momen	Mobile	
2019	Merry Garland	Pilkill	Mobile	
2019	Seiken Manifestia	Hinako Sakomizu, Ichiko Miyazawa, Celine Idemitsu	Mobile	
2019–2022	Monster Strike	Jiutou Zhiji, Regulus, Nebanjyakujou	Mobile	
2019	Engage Princess ~ Sleeping Princess and Dream Wizard ~	Gloria	Mobile	
2019	Brown Dust	Lecliss	Mobile	
2019–2020	Azur Lane	HMS Glasgow, I-58, USS Seattle	Mobile	
2019	Shōmetsu Toshi 0	Ayame	Mobile	
2019	Cinderella Nine	Yuzu Takanashi	Mobile	
2019	Sword and balance detectory	Linette	Mobile	Main cast
2019	Dragon Quest Rivals	Seraphy	Switch, Windows, Mobile	
2019	Like a lion	Nohime	Mobile	
2019	Love Live! School Idol Festival All Stars	Setsuna Yuki	Mobile	Main cast
2019	Touhou Cannonball	Aun Koreino	Mobile	
2019	Youkai Shoden ~ Mononoke Sankaikei ~	Hanarin	Mobile	
2020	Venus Eleven Bibiddo!	Mikoto Tenshi	Mobile	
2020	Nyangrila	Lara	Mobile	
2020	8 beat Story ♪	Quell	Mobile	
2020	BATON = RELAY	Yakumo Tsutsumi	Mobile	
2020	Cytus 2	Vanessa	Mobile	Main antagonist
2020	Kyoutou Kotodaman	Utaware, Korobishop, San Death Goemon, Tariyadari, Nshaka	Mobile	
2020–2021	Granblue Fantasy	Chulainn	Mobile	
2020	Final Fantasy Crystal Chronicles Remaster	Bell Datt	PS4, Switch, Mobile	DLC
2020	Dragon Quest X	Seraphy	Wii, Wii U, PC, Mobile, 3DS, PS4, Switch	
2020	Project Sekai: Colorful Stage feat. Hatsune Miku	Kanade Yoisaki	Mobile	Main cast
2020	RANBU Sangokushi Ranbu	Xun Yu, Lu Xun	Mobile	
2020	Touhou LostWord	Various	Mobile	
2021	War of the Visions: Final Fantasy Brave Exvius	Creysse	Mobile	
2021	Seirei Gensouki: Another Tale	Latifa	Browser	
2021	Alchemy Stars	Vice	Mobile	
2021	Idoly Pride	Satomi Hashimoto	Mobile	
2021	Brave Frontier Rezona	Leonora	Mobile	
2021	That Time I Got Reincarnated as a Slime: ISEKAI Memories	Shinsha	Mobile	
2021	Yu-Gi-Oh! Rush Duel: Dawn of the Battle Royale!!	Romin Kirishima	Switch	
2021	Project MIKHAIL	Sumika Kagami	Mobile	
2022	Deemo II	Echo	Mobile	Main cast
2022	Bravely Default: Brilliant Lights	Claire	Mobile	Main cast
2022	Heaven Burns Red	Ruka Kayamori	Mobile, Windows	Protagonist
2022	Isekai ni Tobasaretara Papa ni Nattan Daga: Spirit Knight Story	Koi	Mobile	
2022	Monster Hunter Rise Sunbreak	Chichae	Switch, Windows	Expansion DLC
2023	Yu-Gi-Oh! Rush Duel: Strongest Battle Royale!! Let's Go! Go Rush!!	Rovian Kirishima	Switch	
2023	Goddess of Victory: Nikke	Viper, Makima	Mobile	
2023	Magia Record	Ebony	Mobile	
2023	Yu-Gi-Oh! Duel Links	Romin Kirishima	Mobile and PC	
2024	Honkai: Star Rail	Firefly	PC, Mobile, PS5	
2024	Ex Astris	Astero	Mobile	

=== Drama CD ===
Title	Role	Remarks
2018
Seirei Gensouki: Spirit Chronicles	Latifa	Volumes 12, 14, 17 Special Edition with Drama CD/ 2018–2020
2020
Goblin Slayer	Redhead Forest Person	Volume 12 Drama CD Limited Special Edition
My Friend's Little Sister Has It In for Me!	Mashiro Tsukinomori	Main cast/ Volumes 4, 5, 7, 8, and 9 Special edition with drama CD
2022
Tearmoon Empire	Anne Littstein	Main cast for first and second drama CDs (2022–2023)
Endo and Kobayashi Live! The Latest on Tsundere Villainess Lieselotte	Lieselotte Riefenstahl	Manga volume 5 special edition drama CD

=== Promotional video ===
- The Vexations of a Shut-In Vampire Princess PV (2019) Narration/Komari
- Spy Classroom PV (2020) Code name <Forgetter>
- Heat the Pig Liver PV (2020) Jess
- The Vexations of a Shut-In Vampire Princess Volume 2 PV (2019) Komari
- I tried to read Dengeki Bunko aloud
  - Sankaku no Kyori wa Kagirinai Zero (2021)
  - Tonari no kanojo to yofukashi gohan (2021)
  - Guild no Uketsukejou desu ga, Zangyou wa Iya nanode Boss wo Solo Toubatsu Shiyou to Omoimasu (2021)
  - Hello,Hello and Hello (2021)
- Yūsha-kei ni Shosu Chōbatsu Yūsha 9004-tai Keimu Kiroku PV (2022) Theoritta
- Ao no Outline PV (2022) Yuri Kashiwazaki
- End of Arcadia PV (2022) Philia Lordrain
- Blade & Bastard: warm ash Dusky dungeon (2022) Garbage

=== Audio drama ===
- Märchen Mädchen Volume 4 limited edition bonus audio drama (2018)
- Yoru ni Kakeru Audio Drama (2021) Women

=== Radio ===
※internet Radio

- Märchen Mädchen Kusunoki Tomori's Minarai Radio (2017–2018)- Onsen※/ HiBiki RAdio Station※/ Super! A&G +※
- Sword Art Online Alternative Gun Gale Offline (2018)- Onsen※/ HiBiKi Radio Station※
- Kusunoki Tomori's Kirara Fantasia Radio (2018–2022)- AbemaRADIO※
- Love Live! Nijigasaki High School Idol Club~ Ohiruyasumi Housou shitsu (2018–2020)- HiBiKi Radio Station※
- Kusunoki Tomori's Tomoriru Candle (2018–present)- Onsen※
- Kaede Hondo and Kusunoki Tomori's FUN'S PROJECT LAB (2019–2020)- Nippon Cultural Broadcasting
- Assassins pradio (2019–2020)- HiBiKi Radio Station※
- Tomodachi no Imouto ga radio demo uzai (2019–present)- YouTube※ Twitter※ Irregular broadcast
- Love Live! Nijigasaki High School Idol Club~ Ohayou Housou Shitsu (2020–2022)- HiBiKi Radio Station※
- Kusunoki Tomori The Music Reverie (2020–present)-Nippon Cultural Broadcasting
- The Misfit of Demon King Academy History's Strongest Demon King Reincarnates and Appears in a Radio with His Descendants (2020–2021; 2023)- Onsen※
- 25ji Night Radio de (2020–present)- YouTube※
- Shōsetsuka ni Narō Novel on Radio (2021)- FM802 April's monthly artist
- Endo and Kobayashi Live! The Latest on Tsundere Villainess Lieselotte with facilitator Kusunoki (2023)- Onsen※

=== Other works ===
Year	Title	Role	Remarks
2017	Onsen Musume	Ririn Otemachi	
2018	Banmeshi ♪	Tsuyuri Yokaze	
2020	Prima Doll	Karasuba	Web novel
2021	Princess Letters(s)! From Idol	Ayame Mizukuki	
2021	Bokura Mada Underground	Boy, Girl	For Vocaloid producer Eve's official app "ZINGAI"
2022	Blade & Bastard: warm ash Dusky dungeon	Garbage	Insert voice for Volume 1

== Discography ==
=== Extended plays ===
Unless stated otherwise, songs are composed and written by Kusunoki

Release date	Title	Product serial			Album details	Peak Oricon chart positions	Notes
Release date	Title	First run limited edition	Standard edition	Limited edition	Album details	Peak Oricon chart positions	Notes
May 8, 2024	Shingetsu (シンゲツ)	VVCL-2465/6 (A) VVCL-2467/8 (B)	VVCL-2469	VVCL-2470	Label: Sacra Music; Format: CD, CD+DVD, CD+BD	9	Shingetsu was composed by Tetsuya from L'Arc-en-Ciel.

==== Stream only ====
#	Release date	Title	Album
1st	December 23, 2020	Akatoki (アカトキ)	Forced Shutdown
2nd	February 6, 2021	Sketchbook	Forced Shutdown
3rd	August 25, 2021	Taruhi (タルヒ)	narrow
4th	March 31, 2022	Sankayō (skeleton flower) (山荷葉)	Yarazu no Ame
5th	May 12, 2022	Mōhitokuchi (One more bite) (もうひとくち)	Yarazu no Ame
6th	Dec 16, 2023	Back to Back	—N/a

=== Albums ===
List of albums, with selected chart positions
Title	Album details	Peak chart positions	Sales
Title	Album details	JPN	Sales
Presence	Released: May 24, 2023; Label: Sacra Music	34	JPN: 1,758
Absence	Released: May 24, 2023; Label: Sacra Music	35	JPN: 1,750
Presence/Absence	Released: May 24, 2023; Label: Sacra Music	19	JPN: 3,390
Landerblue	Released: November 26, 2025; Label: Sacra Music	22	JPN: 3,325

=== Extended plays ===
Unless stated otherwise, songs are composed and written by Kusunoki

Release date	Title	Product serial			Album details	Peak Oricon chart positions	Sales (JPN)	Notes
Release date	Title	First run limited edition	Standard edition	Limited edition	Album details	Peak Oricon chart positions	Sales (JPN)	Notes
August 19, 2020	Hamidashimono (ハミダシモノ)	VVCL-1660/1 (A) VVCL-1662/3 (B)	VVCL-1664	VVCL-1665/6	Label: Sacra Music; Format: CD, CD+DVD, CD+BD	6	11,845	Debut release The title track "Hamidashimono" was the ending theme of the anime The Misfit of Demon King Academy "Hamidashimono" is composed by Ryosuke Shigenaga and written by Kusunoki; "Kimi no miru sekai, boku no miru sekai" was co-composed by Ryosuke Shigenaga and Kusunoki and written by Kusunoki;
April 28, 2021	Forced Shutdown	VVCL-1838/9 (A) VVCL-1840/1(B)	VVCL-1844	VVCL-1842/3	Label: Sacra Music; Format: CD, CD+DVD, CD+BD	4	11,164	Kanon Narumi and Kusunoki co-wrote "Akatoki" and Kusunoki composed the song.
November 10, 2021	Narrow	VVCL-1936/7 (A) VVCL-1938/9 (B)	VVCL-1942	VVCL-1940/1	Label: Sacra Music; Format: CD, CD+DVD, CD+BD	9	8,340	
June 1, 2022	Yarazu no Ame (Rain that comes down as if to stop people from going home) (遣らずの雨)	VVCL-2046/7 (A) VVCL-2048/9 (B)	VVCL-2052	VVCL-2050/1	Label: Sacra Music; Format: CD, CD+DVD, CD+BD	6	7,791	"Mouhitokuchi" is composed by Sasanomaly and written by Kusunoki; "Alive" was composed by Masayuki Kondo and Kusunoki and written by Kusunoki.
November 6, 2024	Toro (吐露)				Label: Sacra Music; Format: CD	14	4,654	

=== Indies ===
	Release date	Title	Songs	Album	Sale Place
1st	December 12, 2018	Acoustic CD [bottled-up]	Nagame no Sora	Hamidashimono	Kusunoki Tomori birthday live『scene of light』
1st	December 12, 2018	Acoustic CD [bottled-up]	Clover	—N/a	Kusunoki Tomori birthday live『scene of light』
2nd	July 21, 2019	■STROKE■	Sketchbook	Forced Shutdown	Kusunoki Tomori Summer live 2019 『Shinki Unochikagami』
2nd	July 21, 2019	■STROKE■	Akatoki	Forced Shutdown	Kusunoki Tomori Summer live 2019 『Shinki Unochikagami』
2nd	July 21, 2019	■STROKE■	Romanron	Hamidashimono	Kusunoki Tomori Summer live 2019 『Shinki Unochikagami』

=== Concert video ===
	Release date	Title	Product serial			Notes
	Release date	Title	limited edition	BDs	DVDs	Notes
1st	December 7, 2022	Tomori Kusunoki Zepp TOUR 2022 『SINK FLOAT』	VVXL-107	VVXL-109	VVBL-158	

=== Featuring artist ===
Release date	Product	Artist	Songs	Remarks
December 6, 2023	Nemurenai EP (眠れない EP)	Miminari	Nemurenai feat. Kusunoki Tomori (眠れない feat.楠木ともり)	Ending theme song for the anime The Vexations of a Shut-In Vampire Princess
January 24, 2024	Stupid Dog	Toboe	Magaimono feat. Kusunoki Tomori (紛い者 feat.楠木ともり)	

=== Character songs ===
Refer to Love Live! Nijigasaki High School Idol Club for songs related to Love live! Nijigasaki High School Idol Club multimedia franchise.

Release date	Product	Singer	Songs	Remarks
2018
May 9	To see the future	LLENN (Tomori Kusunoki)	"To see the future"	Ending theme song for the anime Sword Art Online Alternative Gun Gale Online
June 22	Sword Art Online Alternative Gun Gale Online BD/DVD vol 1 Bonus CD	LLENN (Tomori Kusunoki)	"Lucky Girl"	Song related to the Sword Art Online Alternative Gun Gale Anime.
November 7	Anima Yell! Theme Song collection -Smile- (テレビアニメ「アニマエール！」テーマソングコレクション -Smile-)	Kaminoki High School Cheerleading club (Note: Members are Kohane Hatoya (Yuka Ozaki), Hizume Arima (Yuina Yamada), Uki Sawatari (Mikako Izawa), Kotetsu Tatejima (Tomori Kusunoki), and Kana Ushiku (Haruka Shiraishi))	"Jump up ↑ Yell!!" (ジャンプアップ↑エール!!)	Opening theme song for the animeAnima Yell!
November 7	Anima Yell! Theme Song collection -Smile- (テレビアニメ「アニマエール！」テーマソングコレクション -Smile-)	Kaminoki High School Cheerleading club	"One for all	Ending theme song for the anime Anima Yell!
November 7	Anima Yell! Theme Song collection -Smile- (テレビアニメ「アニマエール！」テーマソングコレクション -Smile-)	Kaminoki High School Cheerleading club	"Color Select"	Song related to the Anima Yell! Anime
November 7	"Anima Yell!" Theme Song Collection -Wink- (テレビアニメ「アニマエール！」テーマソングコレクション -Wink-)	Kotetsu Tatejima (Tomori Kusunoki)	"Dadamore ♥ Secret Heart" (だだもれ♥シークレットハート)	Song related to the Anima Yell! Anime
November 28	Sword Art Online Alternative Gun Gale Online BD / DVD Volume 6 Bonus CD	Karen Kohirumaki (Tomori Kusunoki)	"Ame Nochi Hare" (雨のち晴れ)	Song related to the Sword Art Online Alternative Gun Gale Anime.
December 5	Bitter escape (ビター・エスケープ)	Tsuyuri Yokaze (Tomori Kusunoki)	"Bitter Escape ~Tsuyuri Edition~" (ビター・エスケープ 〜夜風 edition〜)	Song related to the multimedia franchise Banmeshi ♪
December 25	Passionate Journey	Otemachi Ririn (Tomori Kusunoki)	"Passionate Journey" "Negai Kirakira Kirari" (願いキラキラきらり)>	Song related to the multimedia franchise Onsen Musume
2019
March 13	Hyōhaku datto (漂白脱兎)	Blanc Bunny Bandit [Tsuyuri Yokaze (Tomori Kusunoki)]	"Synchro Fish" (シンクロフィッシュ)	Song related to the multimedia franchise Banmeshi♪
March 13	Hyōhaku datto (漂白脱兎)	Blanc Bunny Bandit (Note: Participating members are Tsuyuri Yokaze (Tomori Kusunoki) and Chiyo Yoshimaki (Minami Takahashi (voice actress)))	"Hyōhaku Datto" (漂白脱兎)	Song related to the multimedia franchise Banmeshi♪
March 13	Hyōhaku datto (漂白脱兎)	Blanc Bunny Bandit (Note: Participating members are Tsuyuri Yokaze (Tomori Kusunoki) and Arisa Kurokawa (Saki Yasui))	"Avant-garde Band Girls" (アバンギャルド・バンドガールズ)	Song related to the multimedia franchise Banmeshi♪
March 13	Hyōhaku datto (漂白脱兎)	Hachi Yorozu Dentō Chiku Shinkōkai	"Okumino Hachimanka" (奥美濃八萬歌)	Song related to the multimedia franchise Banmeshi♪
May 22	Chō ni Natte Mimasen ka? (蝶になってみませんか)	Rinmeikan Girls school (Note: Members are Tamao Tomoe (Tomori Kusunoki), Rui Akikaze (Risa Tsumugi), Ichie Otonashi (Azumi Waki), Yuyuko Tanaka (Iori Saeki), and Yumeōji (Reo Kurachi))	"Chō ni Natte Mimasen ka?" (蝶になってみませんか) "Discovery!"	Songs related to the multimedia franchise Revue Starlight
May 29	Magical Girl Riruriru's theme (楠木ともりのともりるきゃんどる 魔法少女りるりるのテーマ)	Magical girl Riruriru (Tomori Kusunoki)	"Magical Girl Riruriru's theme" (楠木ともりのともりるきゃんどる 魔法少女りるりるのテーマ)	Song related to Kusunoki's Radio "Kusunoki Tomori no Tomoriru candle"
October 16	Shoujo ☆ Kageki Revue Starlight Revue A La Eternal (少女☆歌劇 レヴュースタァライト レヴューアルバム ラ・レヴュー・エターナル)	Futaba Isurugi (Teru Ikuta), Kaoruko Hanayagi (Ayasa Itō), Tamao Tomoe (Tomori Kusunoki), and Rui Akikaze (Risa Tsumugi)	"Otte Owarete Sirius" (追って追われてシリウス)	Song related to the multimedia franchise Revue Starlight
October 23	Forest Reincarnation_-diva.Tia&Kera- (フォレストリンカネーション_-diva.Tia&Kera-)	Tia (Tomori Kusunoki) and Kera (Kaori Ishihara)	"Forest reincarnation" (フォレストリンカネーション)	Song related to the multimedia franchise Arumagia -project-
October 23	Forest Reincarnation_-diva.Tia&Kera- (フォレストリンカネーション_-diva.Tia&Kera-)	Tia (Tomori Kusunoki)	"Calling in fight"	Song related to the multimedia franchise Arumagia -project-
November 11	– (Note: No CD sale)	Enigma Flowers (Note: Enigma Cherry (Rika Nagae), Enigma Sunflower (Tomori Kusunoki), and Enigma Morning Glory (Airi Otsu))	"NON STOP! Enigmaflowers" (NON STOP！エニグマフラワーズ)	Theme song for the event "Colorful EnigimaFlowers" in the game Black cat project
November 20	Torchlight 〜yume no akari〜 (Torchlight〜夢の灯り〜) (Note: Online distribution only)	KiraraQuintet (Note: Kirara (Tomori Kusunoki), Lamp (Marika Kouno), Claire (Azumi Waki), Polka (Eriko Matsui), and Cork (Yūki Kuwahara))	"Torchlight 〜yume no akari〜" (Torchlight〜夢の灯り〜)	Theme song for the game Kirara Fantasia (Recorded 2017)
November 27	ijin tachi no jikan (異人たちの時間)	Mérida Angel ( Tomori Kusunoki )	"ijin tachi no jikan" (異人たちの時間)	Ending theme song for the anime Assassin's Pride
2020
January 29	Magical Girl Riruriru the Movie!?'s theme song "Light up" (劇場版!?魔法少女りるりる 主題歌「Light up!」)	Magical Girl Riruriru ( Tomori Kusunoki )	"Magical Girl Riruriru the Movie!?'s theme song "Light up"" (劇場版!?魔法少女りるりる 主題歌「Light up!」)	Song related to Kusunoki's Radio "Kusunoki Tomori no Tomoriru candle"
March 18	kyōmeisei shiro some jiyū shugi (共鳴性白染自由主義)	Blanc Bunny Bandit (Note: Tsuyuri Yokaze (Tomori Kusunoki), Chiyo Yoshimaki (Minami Takahashi (voice actress)), Arisa Kurokawa (Saki Yasui), and Hyakutake Monaka (Takao Tanaka))	"kyōmeisei shiro some jiyū shugi" (共鳴性白染自由主義)	Song related to the multimedia franchise Banmeshi♪
March 18	kyōmeisei shiro some jiyū shugi (共鳴性白染自由主義)	Blanc Bunny Bandit [Tsuyuri Yokaze (Tomori Kusunoki)]	"Sabaku o oyogu" (砂漠を泳ぐ)	Song related to the multimedia franchise Banmeshi♪
March 18	kyōmeisei shiro some jiyū shugi (共鳴性白染自由主義)	Blanc Bunny Bandit (Note: Participating members are Tsuyuri Yokaze (Tomori Kusunoki) and Hyakutake Monaka (Takao Tanaka))	"OUR JOURNEY"	Song related to the multimedia franchise Banmeshi♪
March 18	kyōmeisei shiro some jiyū shugi (共鳴性白染自由主義)	Blanc Bunny Bandit	"Shin sekai Riot" (新世界ライオット)	Song related to the multimedia franchise Banmeshi♪
April 15	Setsuna, todoroku kansei (刹那、轟く歓声)	IN-HI 16 (Note: Sora Azuma (Yūka Aisaka), Chiyo Sakurada (Maki Kawase), Yuzu Takanashi (Tomori Kusunoki), Lynn Rayfa (Yui Fukuo), and Runa Kusakari (Shiki Aoki))	"No.1 HOLiC" "IENAI" "UNKNOWNS"	Song Related to the multimedia franchise Cinderella Nine
July 15	Banmeshi ♪ Furusato Grand Prix ROUND1 〜Spring Team〜 (バンめし♪ ふるさとグランプリ ROUND1 〜春の陣〜)	Blanc Bunny Bandit [Tsuyuri Yokaze (Tomori Kusunoki)]	"ROOM"	Song related to the multimedia franchise Banmeshi♪
September 23	Initial (イニシャル)	Karen Aijō (Momoyo Koyama), Hikari Kagura (Suzuko Mimori), Akira Yukishiro (Hotaru Nomoto), Aruru Otsuki (Megumi Han), and Tamao Tomoe (Tomori Kusunoki)	"Initial" (イニシャル)	Song related to the multimedia franchise Revue Starlight
September 30	The Misfit of Demon King Academy BD / DVD Volume 1 Bonus CD	Misha (Tomori Kusunoki)	"BIRTH//DAY"	A song related to The Misfit of Demon King Academy anime
December 28	Gōha dai 7 shōgakkō kōka(4 person Version) (ゴーハ第7小学校校歌（4人合唱ver.）)	Yuuga (Hiiro Ishibashi), Luke (Taku Yashiro), Gakuto (Natsuki Hanae), and Romin (Tomori Kusunoki)	"Gōha dai 7 shōgakkō kōka" (ゴーハ第7小学校校歌)	Ending theme for the anime Yu-Gi-Oh! Sevens
2021
February 24	BIBLION	B.A.C (Note: Amor (Minami Tanaka), Quell (Tomori Kusunoki), and Bell (Chisa Suganuma))	"Silent World" "Pious Bullets" "UTOPIA" "Blessing After Cataclysm"	Songs related to the game 8 beat Story♪
March 10	Sudachi no Uta / Life is Cider (巣立ちの歌/Life is サイダー)	Anemoneria (Note: Members are Kanata Aikawa, Tomori Kusunoki, Shuka Saitō, and Hinaki Yano)	"Sudachi no Uta" (巣立ちの歌)	Opening theme song for the anime Wonder Egg Priority
March 10	Sudachi no Uta / Life is Cider (巣立ちの歌/Life is サイダー)	Anemoneria	"Life is Cider" (Life is サイダー)	Ending theme song for the anime Wonder Egg Priority
March 10	Sudachi no Uta / Life is Cider (巣立ちの歌/Life is サイダー)	Anemoneria	"anemos"	A song related to the anime Wonder Egg Priority
March 10	Sudachi no Uta / Life is Cider (巣立ちの歌/Life is サイダー)	Neiru Aonuma (Tomori Kusunoki)	""Sudachi no Uta" (巣立ちの歌)	A song related to the anime Wonder Egg Priority
March 13	Gōha dai 7 shōgakkō kōka(Romin Version) (ゴーハ第7小学校校歌（ロミンver.）)	Romin Kirishima (Tomori Kusunoki)	"Gōha dai 7 shōgakkō kōka" (ゴーハ第7小学校校歌)	Ending theme song for the anime Yu-Gi-Oh! Sevens
March 16	Searchlight―Yume Totsutsu Monogatari― (Searchlight ―夢とうつつの物語―)	Kirara Terzett (Note: Kirara (Tomori Kusunoki), Lamp (Marika Kouno), and Utsutsu Sumiyoshi (Kaori Maeda))	"Searchlight―Yume Totsutsu Monogatari―" (Searchlight ―夢とうつつの物語―)	2nd Theme song for the game Kirara Fantasia
April 16	Mizukuki Ayame no hanashi (水茎あやめの話)	Ayame Mizukuki (Tomori Kusunoki)	"Mizukuki Ayame no hanashi" (水茎あやめの話)	A song for the franchise Princess Letter (s)! From Idol
April 25	Yake tsuku Yell (灼けつくエール)	IN-HI 16	"1844 Yori Hayaku" (1844より速く) "Saiteki Kai Shōjo" (最適解少女)	Song Related to the multimedia franchise Cinderella Nine
August 4	Kuyamu to Kaite Mirai/Keitai Renwa/Jackpot Sad Girl (悔やむと書いてミライ/携帯恋話/ジャックポットサッドガール)	Nightcord at 25:00 (Note: Members are Kanade Yoisaki (Tomori Kusunoki), Mafuyu Asahina (Rui Tanabe), Ena Shinonome (Minori Suzuki), and Mizuki Akiyama (Hinata Sato)) and Hatsune Miku	"Kuyamu to Kaite Mirai" (悔やむと書いてミライ) "Jackpot Sad Girl" (ジャックポットサッドガール)	Songs related to the game Project Sekai: Colorful Stage feat. Hatsune Miku
October 27	Annoying! San San Week! (アノーイング！さんさんウィーク！)	Futaba Igarashi (Tomori Kusunoki), Tōko Sakurai (Saori Hayami), Natsumi Kurobe (Reina Aoyama), and Mona Tsukishiro (Aoi Koga)	"Annoying! San San Week!" (アノーイング！さんさんウィーク！)	Opening theme song for the anime My Senpai Is Annoying
October 27	Annoying! San San Week! (アノーイング！さんさんウィーク！)	Futaba Igarashi (Tomori Kusunoki), Tōko Sakurai (Saori Hayami), Natsumi Kurobe (Reina Aoyama), and Mona Tsukishiro (Aoi Koga)	"Idol song utattemita" (アイドルソングうたってみた)	A song related to the anime My Senpai Is Annoying
December 8	Sekai/Wah Wah World/Gunjō Sanka (セカイ/ワーワーワールド/群青讃歌)	Ichika Hoshino (Ruriko Noguchi), Tsukasa Tenma (Daisuke Hirose), Kanade Yoisaki (Tomori Kusunoki), and Hatsune Miku	"Sekai" (セカイ)	One of two theme songs for the mobile rhythm game Hatsune Miku: Colorful Stage!
December 8	Sekai/Wah Wah World/Gunjō Sanka (セカイ/ワーワーワールド/群青讃歌)	Ichika Hoshino (Ruriko Noguchi), Minori Hanasato (Yui Ogura), Kohane Azuzawa (Akina), Tsukasa Tenma (Daisuke Hirose), Kanade Yoisaki (Tomori Kusunoki), and Hatsune Miku	"Gunjō Sanka" (群青讃歌)	One year annivsary Song for the mobile rhythm game Hatsune Miku: Colorful Stage!
2022
January 12	Handmade Ryusei(Satsuki Sora no baai) (ハンドメイド流星雨（皐月ソラの場合)	Sora Satsuki (Tomori Kusunoki)	"Handmade Ryusei" (ハンドメイド流星雨)	A song related to the multimedia franchise Fifteen Girls
January 19	Kagirinaku Haiiro e/ID Smile (限りなく灰色へ/アイディスマイル)	Nightcord at 25:00 and Kagamine Rin	"Kagirinaku Haiiro e" (限りなく灰色へ)	Songs related for the mobile rhythm game Hatsune Miku: Colorful Stage!
January 19	Kagirinaku Haiiro e/ID Smile (限りなく灰色へ/アイディスマイル)	Nightcord at 25:00 and MEIKO	"ID Smile" (アイディスマイル)	Songs related for the mobile rhythm game Hatsune Miku: Colorful Stage!
January 28	Yoake no Ayame (よあけのあやめ)	Ayame Mizukuki (Tomori Kusunoki)	"Yoake no Ayame feat.Tomgg" (よあけのあやめ feat.Tomggg)	A song for the franchise Princess Letter (s)! From Idol
February 26	Floating Flower(s)!	Yoshino Kariya (Rie Takahashi), Ayame Mizukuki (Tomori Kusunoki), and Tayori Kingyobachi (Yu Serizawa)	"Floating Flower(s)!"	A song for the franchise Princess Letter (s)! From Idol
March 16	Yugioh SEVENS Original sound track SOUND RUSH THREE!! (『遊☆戯☆王SEVENS』オリジナル・サウンドトラック SOUND RUSH THREE)	Romin Kirishima (Kusunoki Tomori)	"Are You Re:D?"	Insert song/Ending theme song for the anime for the 87th episode of the anime Yugioh SEVENS. Was written by Kusunoki.
April 6	25ji, Nightcord de: Sekai Album vol.1 (25時、ナイトコードで。 SEKAI ALBUM vol.1)	Nightcord at 25:00 (Note: Kanade Yoisaki (Tomori Kusunoki), Mafuyu Asahina (Rui Tanabe)) and Hatsune Miku	"Jishou Mushoku" (自傷無色) "Cutlery" (カトラリー)	Cover songs for the mobile rhythm game Hatsune Miku: Colorful Stage!
April 6	25ji, Nightcord de: Sekai Album vol.1 (25時、ナイトコードで。 SEKAI ALBUM vol.1)	Nightcord at 25:00 [Kanade Yoisaki (Tomori Kusunoki)] and Hatsune Miku	"Inochi ni Kirawarete iru." (命に嫌われている。) "Yoru ni Kakeru" (夜に駆ける)	Cover songs for the mobile rhythm game Hatsune Miku: Colorful Stage!
April 6	25ji, Nightcord de: Sekai Album vol.1 (25時、ナイトコードで。 SEKAI ALBUM vol.1)	Nightcord at 25:00 (Note: Kanade Yoisaki (Tomori Kusunoki) and Mizuki Akiyama (Hinata Satō)) and Hatsune Miku	"Hitorinbo Envy" (独りんぼエンヴィー)	Cover songs for the mobile rhythm game Hatsune Miku: Colorful Stage!
April 6	25ji, Nightcord de: Sekai Album vol.1 (25時、ナイトコードで。 SEKAI ALBUM vol.1)	Nightcord at 25:00 and Hatsune Miku	"Bitter Choco Decoration" (ビターチョコデコレーション)	Cover songs for the mobile rhythm game Hatsune Miku: Colorful Stage!
June 22	Painted Aurora -shine for us- (極光彩色 -shine for us-)	Vice (Tomori Kusunoki), Carleen (Ami Koshimizu)	"Painted Aurora -shine for us-" (極光彩色 -shine for us-)	A song to celebrate the first anniversary of Alchemy Stars
June 29	Zen Hōkō Maigo Catalog (全方向迷子カタログ)	Shiika Ikebukuro (Tomori Kusunoki)	"Zen Hōkō Maigo Catalog" (全方向迷子カタログ)	A song to promote the first volume of the light novel Looks Are All You Need
July 6	Tin Toy Melody	Chat Noir (Note: Haizakura (Azumi Waki), Karasuba (Tomori Kusunoki), Gekka (Miyu Tomita), Hōkiboshi (Yuki Nakashima), and Retzel (Akari Kitō))	"Tin Toy Melody"	Opening theme song for the anime Prima Doll
July 6	Tin Toy Melody	Chat Noir	"Kikai Shiikake no Sanka" (機械仕掛けの賛歌)	A song related to the multimedia franchise Prima Doll
July 6	SHOW UP	Chat Noir	"Yume Saki* Hare Butai" (夢咲＊ハレ舞台)	A song related to the multimedia franchise Prima Doll
July 6	SHOW UP	Karasuba (Tomori Kusunoki)	"Tsugihagi" (ツギハギ)	Song was used as the ending theme for the 4th episode of the Prima Doll anime
August 19	Mienai Tsubasa (見えない翼)	Ayame Mizukuki (Tomori Kusunoki)	"Mienai Tsubasa (feat.bassy)" (見えない翼(feat.bassy))	A song for the franchise Princess Letter (s)! From Idol
September 21	ON STAGE	Chat Noir	"Sō Utatō" (想歌灯)	A song related to the multimedia franchise Prima Doll
September 21	ON STAGE	Karasuba (Tomori Kusunoki)	"Hana Haori" (華羽織)	A song related to the multimedia franchise Prima Doll
September 21	Revue Album Arcana Arcadia	Akira Yukishiro (Hotaru Nomoto), Liu Mei Fan (Yume Takeuchi), Tamao Tomoe (Tomori Kusunoki), Hikari Kagura (Suzuko Mimori), and Claudine Saijo (Aina Aiba)	"Eien wa Shishite Ikiru" (永遠ハ死シテ生キル)	Songs related to the multimedia franchise Revue Starlight
October 19	Kanade Tomosu Sora/Saisei (カナデトモスソラ/再生)	Nightcord at 25:00 and Megurine Luka	"Kanade Tomosu Sora" (カナデトモスソラ)	Songs related for the mobile rhythm game Hatsune Miku: Colorful Stage!
October 19	Kanade Tomosu Sora/Saisei (カナデトモスソラ/再生)	Nightcord at 25:00 and Kagamine Rin	"Saisei" (再生)	Songs related for the mobile rhythm game Hatsune Miku: Colorful Stage!
November 30	Prima Doll Blu-ray vol 2 Limited Edition bonus CD	Karasuba (Tomori Kusunoki)	"Tori no Uta" (鳥の詩)	Cover song of the opening theme for the Anime Air; Related to the multimedia franchise Prima Doll
2023
March 29	Prima Doll Blu-ray vol 6 Limited Edition bonus CD	Chat Noir	"Little Busters!"	Cover song of the opening theme for the Anime Little Busters! Related to the multimedia franchise Prima Doll
April 12	Lower One's Eyes/Tricologe	Nightcord at 25:00 and MEIKO	"Lower One's Eyes"	Songs related to the game Project Sekai: Colorful Stage feat. Hatsune Miku
April 12	Lower One's Eyes/Tricologe	Nightcord at 25:00 and Hatsune Miku	"Tricologe"	Songs related to the game Project Sekai: Colorful Stage feat. Hatsune Miku
April 28	Be The MUSIC!	"All Music MIKUdemy" everyone	"Be The MUSIC!"	Songs related to the game Project Sekai: Colorful Stage feat. Hatsune Miku
June 7	Nomad/Bug	Nightcord at 25:00 and Kagamine Rin	"Nomad"	Songs related to the game Project Sekai: Colorful Stage feat. Hatsune Miku
June 7	Nomad/Bug	Nightcord at 25:00 and Kagamine Len	"Bug"	Songs related to the game Project Sekai: Colorful Stage feat. Hatsune Miku
June 9	Kotohana Letter(s)! (言花Letter(s)!)	Yoshino Kariya (Rie Takahashi), Ayame Mizukuki (Tomori Kusunoki), and Tayori Kingyobachi (Yu Serizawa)	"Kotohana Letter(s)!" (言花Letter(s)!)	A song for the franchise Princess Letter (s)! From Idol
September 27	Kimi no Yoru o Kure/ I Nan desu (君の夜をくれ/Iなんです)	Nightcord at 25:00 and Megurine Luka	"Kimi no Yoru o Kure" (君の夜をくれ)	Songs related to the game Project Sekai: Colorful Stage feat. Hatsune Miku
September 27	Kimi no Yoru o Kure/ I Nan desu (君の夜をくれ/Iなんです)	Nightcord at 25:00 and Hatsune Miku	"I Nan desu" (Iなんです)	Songs related to the game Project Sekai: Colorful Stage feat. Hatsune Miku
September 27	Princess Letter(s)! From Idol complete best album	Ayame Mizukuki (Tomori Kusunoki)	"Mizukuki Ayame no hanashi" (水茎あやめの話) "Yoake no Ayame feat.Tomgg" (よあけのあやめ feat.Tomggg) "Mienai Tsubasa (feat.bassy)" (見えない翼(feat.bassy)) "Kotohana Letter(s)!" (言花Letter(s)!)	A song for the franchise Princess Letter (s)! From Idol
September 27	Princess Letter(s)! From Idol complete best album	Yoshino Kariya, Ayame Mizukuki (Tomori Kusunoki), and Tayori Kingyobachi	Spring Letter(s)! Floating Flower(s) "Kotohana Letter(s)!" (言花Letter(s)!)	A song for the franchise Princess Letter (s)! From Idol
October 25	Special Ending Theme CD File.04	Annette (Kusunoki Tomori)	"Pureness×Careless"	Ending theme song for the anime Spy Classroom
November 7	Samsa / Kitty	Nightcord at 25:00 and KAITO	"Samsa"	Songs related to the game Project Sekai: Colorful Stage feat. Hatsune Miku
November 7	Samsa / Kitty	Nightcord at 25:00 and Kagamine Len	"Kitty"	Songs related to the game Project Sekai: Colorful Stage feat. Hatsune Miku
November 17	Watashi ga Warau Riyuu wa (私が笑う理由は)	Jess (Kusunoki Tomori)	"Watashi ga Warau Riyuu wa -ASCA×Jess(CV:Kusunoki Tomori)" (私が笑う理由は -ASCA×ジェス (CV:楠木ともり)-)	Included in the anime limited edition of the single by ASCA; A special version of the opening for the anime Butareba: The Story of a Man Turned into a Pig sung by Jess
2024
January 10	25ji, Nightcord de: Sekai Album vol.2 (25時、ナイトコードで。 SEKAI ALBUM vol.2)	Nightcord at 25:00 (Note: Kanade Yoisaki (Tomori Kusunoki), Ena Shinonome (Minori Suzuki)) and Hatsune Miku	"Mousou Kanshou Daishou Renmei" (妄想感傷代償連盟)	Cover songs for the mobile rhythm game Hatsune Miku: Colorful Stage!
January 10	25ji, Nightcord de: Sekai Album vol.2 (25時、ナイトコードで。 SEKAI ALBUM vol.2)	Nightcord at 25:00 and Hatsune Miku	"Meru"	Cover songs for the mobile rhythm game Hatsune Miku: Colorful Stage!
January 10	25ji, Nightcord de: Sekai Album vol.2 (25時、ナイトコードで。 SEKAI ALBUM vol.2)	Nightcord at 25:00 and MEIKO	"Phony"	Cover songs for the mobile rhythm game Hatsune Miku: Colorful Stage!
January 10	25ji, Nightcord de: Sekai Album vol.2 (25時、ナイトコードで。 SEKAI ALBUM vol.2)	Nightcord at 25:00 and Hatsune Miku	"Deichuu ni Saku" (妄想感傷代償連盟)	Cover songs for the mobile rhythm game Hatsune Miku: Colorful Stage!
January 10	25ji, Nightcord de: Sekai Album vol.2 (25時、ナイトコードで。 SEKAI ALBUM vol.2)	Nightcord at 25:00 and Hatsune Miku	"Non-Breath Oblige"	Cover songs for the mobile rhythm game Hatsune Miku: Colorful Stage!
January 10	25ji, Nightcord de: Sekai Album vol.2 (25時、ナイトコードで。 SEKAI ALBUM vol.2)	Nightcord at 25:00 and Megurine Luka	"Sore ga Anata no Shiawase to Shite mo" (それがあなたの幸せとしても)	Cover songs for the mobile rhythm game Hatsune Miku: Colorful Stage!
January 10	25ji, Nightcord de: Sekai Album vol.2 (25時、ナイトコードで。 SEKAI ALBUM vol.2)	Nightcord at 25:00 and Kagamine Len	"Irony"	Cover songs for the mobile rhythm game Hatsune Miku: Colorful Stage!
January 10	25ji, Nightcord de: Sekai Album vol.2 (25時、ナイトコードで。 SEKAI ALBUM vol.2)	Nightcord at 25:00 and MEIKO	"Inochi Bakkari" (命ばっかり)	Cover songs for the mobile rhythm game Hatsune Miku: Colorful Stage!
February 7	Rail Romanesque origin deluxe edition	Mumumu (Tomori Kusunoki)	6tekiQ.E.D	An insert song for the anime Rail Romanesque
May 22	Project Sekai Colorful Stage! feat. Hatsune Miku Another Vocal Album 25ji, Nightcord de. (プロジェクトセカイ カラフルステージ！ feat. 初音ミク アナザーボーカルアルバム 25時、ナイトコードで。)	Kanade Yoisaki (Tomori Kusunoki)	"Kuyamu to Kaite Mirai" (悔やむと書いてミライ) "Inochi ni Kirawarete iru." (命に嫌われている) "Hitorinbo Envy" (独りんぼエンヴィー) "ID Smile" (アイディスマイル) "Yoru ni Kakeru" (夜に駆ける) "Kanade Tomosu Sora" (カナデトモスソラ) "Cutlery" (カトラリー) "Saisei" (再生) "Gunjō Sanka" (群青讃歌)	Solo version of songs from the game Hatsune Miku: Colorful Stage!

== Live concerts ==
=== Solo events ===
Date	Live	Location	Notes	Official web page
December 12, 2018	Kusunoki Tomori birthday live『scene of light』	TOKYO FM HALL	—N/a	—N/a
July 21, 2019; July 28, 2019	Kusunoki Tomori Summer live 2019 『Shinki Unochikagami』	YES THEATER; Yokohama Landmark Hall	—N/a	—N/a
December 29, 2019	Kusunoki Tomori coming-of-age 『WRAPPED///LIVE廿』	EX THEATER ROPPONGI	Announced solo major debut	—N/a
December 22, 2020	Kusunoki Tomori Birthday Candle Live『MELTWIST』	Online Venue	Announced 2nd EP	
July 25, 2021	Tomori Kusunoki Story Live「LOOM-ROOM No. 725 -ignore-」	Online Venue	—N/a	
December 22, 2021; December 24, 2021	Kusunoki Tomori Birthday Live 2021『Reunion of Sparks』	Toyosu PIT; Zepp Namba	4th EP was announced and Zepp tour in 4 cities was also announced	
July 31, 2022; August 11, 2022; August 13, 2022; August 21, 2022	Tomori Kusunoki Zepp TOUR 2022『SINK⇄FLOAT』	Zepp Namba; Zepp Fukuoka; Zepp DiverCity; Zepp Nagoya	Birthday Live 2022 was announced. It will be a Hall Tour in 3 cities.	
December 10, 2022; December 16, 2022; December 22, 2022	Kusunoki Tomori Birthday Live 2022『RINGLEAM』	NHK Osaka Hall; Japan Special Ceramic Industry Civic Center Village Hall; Hitomi Memorial Hall, Showa Women's University	Announced 1st Album in May 2023 and a nationwide tour in the summer	
July 29-September 9, 2023	TOMORI KUSUNOKI LIVE TOUR 2023 『PRESENCE / ABSENCE』	Zepp Namba; Zepp Nagoya; NIIGATA LOTS; Sendai PIT; Zepp Fukuoka; TOKYO DOME CITY HALL	Announced 2023 birthday live	
December 22, 2023	TOMORI KUSUNOKI BIRTHDAY LIVE 2023 『back to back』	Pacifico Yokohama National Convention Hall	—N/a	

=== Joint events ===
Refer to Love Live! Nijigasaki High School Idol Club for events related to Love live! Nijigasaki High School Idol Club multimedia franchise.

Date	Live	Location
January 3, 2021	Sony Music AnimeSongs ONLINE Nippon Budokan	Nippon Budokan
January 30, 2021	ANIMAX MUSIX 2021 ONLINE supported by U-NEXT	Ariake Arena
February 28, 2021	LisAni! LIVE 2021 SUNDAY STAGE	Nippon Budokan
August 29, 2021	Animelo Summer Live 2021 -COLORS-	Saitama Super Arena
November 26, 2022	SACRA MUSIC FES. 2022 -5th Anniversary-	Makuhari Messe Event Hall
January 27, 2023	Lisani! Live 2023 EXTRA STAGE	Nippon Budokan
