= Tearmoon Empire =

Japanese light novel series

- First light novel volume cover

ティアムーン帝国物語 ～断頭台から始まる、姫の転生逆転ストーリー～ (Tiamūn Teikoku Monogatari: Dantōdai kara Hajimaru, Hime no Tensei Gyakuten Sutōrī)
- Genre: Fantasy
- Novel series
- Written by: Nozomu Mochitsuki
- Published by: Shōsetsuka ni Narō
- Original run: August 13, 2018 – present
- Light novel
- Written by: Nozomu Mochitsuki
- Illustrated by: Gilse
- Published by: TO Books
- English publisher: NA: J-Novel Club
- Imprint: TO Bunko
- Original run: June 10, 2019 – present
- Volumes: 19 (Note: +2 Side Story Collections)
- Manga
- Written by: Nozomu Mochitsuki
- Illustrated by: Mizu Morino
- Published by: TO Books
- English publisher: NA: J-Novel Club
- Magazine: Comic Corona
- Original run: August 12, 2019 – present
- Volumes: 12
- Manga

Jūshatachi no Ochakai
- Written by: Nozomu Mochitsuki
- Illustrated by: Naoharu
- Published by: TO Books
- Imprint: Comic Corona
- Magazine: Corona Ex
- Original run: January 29, 2023 – present
- Volumes: 2
- Anime television series
- Directed by: Yūshi Ibe
- Produced by: Hiroyuki Aoi; Kai Minegishi; Tomoyuki Oowada; Akihiro Sotokawa; Yutaka Suwa
- Written by: Deko Akao
- Music by: Kōji Fujimoto
- Studio: Silver Link
- Licensed by: Crunchyroll (streaming); SEA: Muse Communication
- Original network: Tokyo MX, BS11, MBS
- Original run: October 8, 2023 – December 24, 2023
- Episodes: 12

Tearmoon Empire (Note: Japanese: ティアムーン帝国物語 ～断頭台から始まる、姫の転生逆転ストーリー～, Hepburn: Tiamūn Teikoku Monogatari: Dantōdai kara Hajimaru, Hime no Tensei Gyakuten Sutōrī; lit. "The Tale of the Tearmoon Empire: The Story of the Changed Reincarnated Princess Starting from the Guillotine") is a Japanese light novel series written by Nozomu Mochitsuki. The series began publication on the novel posting website Shōsetsuka ni Narō in August 2018; it was later acquired by TO Books, who are publishing the series in print with illustrations by Gilse. A manga adaptation, illustrated by Mizu Morino, began serialization on the Comic Corona manga website in August 2019. An anime television series adaptation by Silver Link aired from October to December 2023.

== Plot ==
At the collapsed Tearmoon Empire, 20-year-old Princess Mia Luna Tearmoon, who was scorned as a selfish princess, was executed through guillotine. However, instead of dying, she awakens to find herself back in her 12-year-old body, initially believing the event to be a dream, before finding her diary covered in her blood from the execution and containing the entries she made prior to the event. Pleading to avoid the execution at all cost, she decides to rebuild the empire. As such, she would "put her own safety first". Her supposedly selfish action, mixed with her knowledge from her first life, somehow charms the people around her instead as she works hard to turn her enemies in her first life to be her allies.

== Characters ==
Mia Luna Tearmoon (ミーア・ルーナ・ティアムーン, Mīa Rūna Tiamūn)
Voiced by: Sumire Uesaka
The protagonist of the series and the sole princess of Tearmoon Empire. After being executed at the age of twenty following a revolution, she time-leaps back to her 12-year-old days in order to fix her empire's problems while armed with her diary from the future. In the new timeline, her previous epitaph as "The Selfish Princess who Ruined Tearmoon" was erased, eventually becoming "The Great Sage of the Empire". On the surface, they couldn't be more different; but at their core, they were one and the same. Beneath the delusions surrounding her lay an arrogant, cowardly and slightly-selfish persona that hid a lovable idiot even further below. Because, by God, she was trying despite her flaws.
Anne Littstein (アンヌ・リトシュタイン, Annu Ritoshutain)
Voiced by: Tomori Kusunoki
One of Mia's most loyal subjects who tended to her during her time in prison. In the new timeline, Mia rewards Anne's loyalty by making her her personal maid-in-waiting.
Ludwig Hewitt (ルードヴィッヒ・ヒューイット, Rūdovuihhi Hyūitto)
Voiced by: Yuichiro Umehara
One of Mia's most loyal subjects, who sought to reform the financial crisis of the Tearmoon Kingdom, yet his expertise was unable to keep Mia from her execution. In the new timeline, Mia sought Ludwig's help early, utilizing the knowledge she learned from the original Ludwig to help guide him and her to a better empire and away from her execution.
Elise Littstein (エリス・リトシュタイン, Erisu Ritoshutain)
Voiced by: Hina Yōmiya
She is Anne's sick and frail little sister and an aspiring author. In the original timeline, she wrote a novel titled "The Impoverished Prince and the Golden Dragon." Though it was still unfinished at the time, Anne periodically read the story to an imprisoned Mia until Eris' death. In the new timeline, Mia hires Eris to be her personal author, wanting to see a decisive conclusion to the story that the original Eris was unable to write.
Abel Remno (アベル・レムノ, Aberu Remuno)
Voiced by: Yoshitsugu Matsuoka
The second prince of the Kingdom of Remno. In the previous timeline, he was a playboy and gambler stuck in the shadows of his older brother. In the current timeline, he instead takes up horsemanship and starts developing a romantic relationship with Mia.
Sion Sol Sunkland (シオン・ソール・サンクランド, Shion Sōru Sankurando)
Voiced by: Shun Horie
First Prince of Sunkland. A skilled swordsman and a firm believer in justice. In the previous timeline, he helped Tiona lead the revolutionary army that caused Tearmoon to collapse and was the one who adjudicated Mia's execution. In the current timeline, he slowly becomes Mia's friend.
Tiona Rudolvon (ティオーナ・ルドルフォン, Tiōna Rudorufon)
Voiced by: Kanon Takao
Daughter of Outcount Rudolvan, a lesser noble family looked down upon by the central nobility. Knowing this, Tiona studied hard in academics and swordsmanship, yet was bullied heavily by Mia in the original timeline, leading to her forming the Revolutionary Army with Sion and adjudicating Mia's execution. In the new timeline, Mia saves her from bullying and humiliation and treats her as an equal, leading to her becoming one of Mia's greatest allies and future friend.
Rafina Orca Belluga (ラフィーナ・オルカ・ヴェールガ, Rafīna Oruka Vēruga)
Voiced by: Nao Tōyama
Daughter of Duke Belluga of the Holy Principality of Belluga. In the principality, her father is the highest human power, with only God above him. This makes her functionally equivalent to a princess in power and duties. Known as a Saint, she has a strong sense of right and wrong and believes that commoners and nobles are both beloved creations of god. In the previous timeline, she despises Mia and helped Sion and Tiona from behind the scenes. In the current timeline, Mia initially tries to avoid her as much as possible to avoid incurring her wrath again. Through a series of misinterpretations, Rafina eventually comes to believe in Mia's prowess and righteousness, leading to them eventually becoming good friends.
Keithwood (キースウッド, Kīsuuddo)
Voiced by: Toshiki Masuda
Sion's personal attendant. He is often at a loss when trying to control his master, or shepherd those around him.
Liora Lulus (リオラ・ルールー, Riora Rūrū)
Voiced by: Fuko Saito
Tiona's personal assistant. She belongs to a tribe living inside the Forest of Stillness, which, in Mia's first life, came into conflict with the Empire, and one of the reasons for her execution.
Chloe Forkroad (クロエ・フォークロード, Kuroe Fōkurōdo)
Voiced by: Rie Takahashi
The daughter of the owner of a well-known trading group in Tearmoon, who gets bestowed with noble status. She becomes Mia's reading buddy.
Dion Alaia (ディオン・アライア, Dion Araia)
Voiced by: Makoto Furukawa
The soldier who executed Mia in her previous life. Despite being sent to the edge of Lulu territory, he is against engaging the tribe. He finds her act in the Forest of Stillness as an excuse to pull out the troops guarding the forest.
Lin Malong
The head of the equestrian club, who teaches Mia how to ride a horse.
VisCount Berman
A noble who resides in Mia's empire, who tried to expand the kingdom by conquering the Forest of Stillness due to his resentment of the lands, but Mia prevents this.
Cyril Rudolvon
Tiona's brother. He is a genius who created a new type of wheat in his kingdom.
Count Rudolvon
Tiona and Cyril's father.
Mujik
A hunter who lives in the Doni Village.
Monica
A member of the Black Crows who goes undercover as a maid. She secretly works against them to stop the revolution in Remno.
Graham
The leader of the Black Crows, who aids Jem is his plans.
Lambert
The leader of the revolution in Remno, which was arranged by the Black Crows under orders from Jem. He is Lynsha's brother.
Lynsha
Lambert's sister, who opposes the revolution in Remno.
Donovan
A count who was captured by Jem to cause the revolution in Remno. He is later rescued.
Dasayev
A chancellor who was held in the town of Xenia by Jem, but is later rescued.
Jem
The mastermind behind the revolution in Remno. He also schemes to eliminate Mia, as he sees her as a threat to his plans, but is thwarted and punished by Rafina.

== Media ==
=== Light novels ===
Written by Nozomu Mochitsuki, the series began publication on the Shōsetsuka ni Narō novel posting website on August 13, 2018. In June 2019, the series was acquired by TO Books, who published the series in print with illustrations by Gilse. As of September 2026, nineteen volumes and two short story collections have been released.

In November 2019, J-Novel Club announced that they licensed the novels for English publication under their J-Novel Heart imprint.

==== Volumes ====
No.	Original release date	Original ISBN	English release date	English ISBN
1	June 10, 2019	978-4-86-472815-7	February 24, 2020 (digital); September 21, 2021 (print)	978-1-71-837148-4 (digital); 978-1-71-837440-9 (print)
2	November 9, 2019	978-4-86-472872-0	July 19, 2020 (digital); December 7, 2021 (print)	978-1-71-837150-7 (digital); 978-1-71-837441-6 (print)
3	February 10, 2020	978-4-86-472914-7	December 12, 2020 (digital); February 1, 2022 (print)	978-1-71-837152-1 (digital); 978-1-71-837442-3 (print)
4	June 10, 2020	978-4-86-699005-7	March 27, 2021 (digital); March 29, 2022 (print)	978-1-71-837154-5 (digital); 978-1-71-837443-0 (print)
5	October 10, 2020	978-4-86-699065-1	July 19, 2021 (digital); May 24, 2022 (print)	978-1-71-837156-9 (digital); 978-1-71-837444-7 (print)
6	January 9, 2021	978-4-86-699096-5	September 23, 2021 (digital); July 19, 2022 (print)	978-1-71-837158-3 (digital); 978-1-71-837445-4 (print)
7	May 10, 2021	978-4-86-699180-1	March 7, 2022 (digital); December 13, 2022 (print)	978-1-71-837160-6 (digital); 978-1-71-837446-1 (print)
8	September 10, 2021	978-4-86-699279-2	July 4, 2022 (digital); March 14, 2023 (print)	978-1-71-837162-0 (digital); 978-1-71-837447-8 (print)
9	January 8, 2022	978-4-86-699376-8; 978-4-86-699377-5 (SE)	January 5, 2023 (digital); September 12, 2023 (print)	978-1-71-837164-4 (digital); 978-1-71-837448-5 (print)
10	May 10, 2022	978-4-86-699487-1	October 5, 2023 (digital); June 11, 2024 (print)	978-1-71-837166-8 (digital); 978-1-71-837449-2 (print)
11	September 10, 2022	978-4-86-699572-4	January 5, 2024 (digital); January 14, 2025 (print)	978-1-71-837168-2 (digital); 978-1-71-837450-8 (print)
12	January 10, 2023	978-4-86-699704-9	April 26, 2024 (digital); April 15, 2025 (print)	978-1-71-837170-5 (digital); 978-1-71-837451-5 (print)
13	April 10, 2023	978-4-86-699804-6; 978-4-86-699805-3 (SE)	August 28, 2024 (digital); August 26, 2025 (print)	978-1-71-837172-9 (digital); 978-1-71-837452-2 (print)
14	September 9, 2023	978-4-86-699938-8	January 27, 2025 (digital); November 11, 2025 (print)	978-1-71-837174-3 (digital); 978-1-71-837453-9 (print)
15	December 20, 2023	978-4-86-794002-0; 978-4-86-794003-7 (SE)	April 28, 2025 (digital); April 13, 2026 (print)	978-1-71-837176-7 (digital); 978-1-71-837454-6 (print)
SS1	May 15, 2024	978-4-86-794180-5	May 20, 2026 (digital); April 13, 2027 (print)	978-1-71-837180-4 (digital); 978-1-71-831698-0 (print)
16	September 20, 2024	978-4-86-794314-4	February 6, 2026 (digital); February 9, 2027 (print)	978-1-71-837178-1 (digital); 978-1-71-837455-3 (print)
17	January 15, 2025	978-4-86-794429-5	August 21, 2026 (digital)	978-1-71-837182-8
18	August 15, 2025	978-4-86-794670-1	November 20, 2026 (digital)	978-1-71-837184-2
SS2	November 10, 2025	978-4-86-794764-7	—	—
19	September 10, 2026	978-4-86-854118-9	—	—

=== Manga ===
A manga adaptation, illustrated by Mizu Morino, began serialization on the Comic Corona manga website on August 12, 2019. As of September 2026, its individual chapters have been collected into twelve tankōbon volumes.

In May 2022, J-Novel Club announced that they also licensed the manga.

==== Volumes ====
No.	Original release date	Original ISBN	English release date	English ISBN
1	January 20, 2020	978-4-86-472902-4	August 24, 2022 (digital); July 10, 2023 (print)	978-1-71-837752-3 (digital); 978-1-71-833851-7 (print)
2	August 15, 2020	978-4-86-699026-2	October 5, 2022 (digital); October 9, 2023 (print)	978-1-71-837753-0 (digital); 978-1-71-833853-1 (print)
3	May 15, 2021	978-4-86-699181-8	December 28, 2022 (digital); January 8, 2024 (print)	978-1-71-833855-5 (digital); 978-1-71-837754-7 (print)
4	February 15, 2022	978-4-86-699449-9	March 8, 2023 (digital); May 13, 2024 (print)	978-1-71-837755-4 (digital); 978-1-71-833857-9 (print)
5	September 15, 2022	978-4-86-699573-1	November 6, 2023 (digital); September 10, 2024 (print)	978-1-71-837756-1 (digital); 978-1-71-833859-3 (print)
6	April 15, 2023	978-4-86-699807-7	January 31, 2024 (digital); February 11, 2025 (print)	978-1-71-837757-8 (digital); 978-1-71-833861-6 (print)
7	October 14, 2023	978-4-86-699976-0	March 26, 2025 (digital); January 13, 2026 (print)	978-1-71-837758-5 (digital); 978-1-71-833863-0 (print)
8	May 15, 2024	978-4-86-794175-1	July 2, 2025 (digital); April 13, 2026 (print)	978-1-71-837759-2 (digital); 978-1-71-833865-4 (print)
9	January 15, 2025	978-4-86-794407-3	January 14, 2026 (digital); October 13, 2026 (print)	978-1-71-837760-8 (digital); 978-1-71-833867-8 (print)
10	August 15, 2025	978-4-86-794656-5	August 26, 2026 (digital)	978-1-71-837761-5 (digital)
11	March 10, 2026	978-4-86-794902-3	—	—
12	September 10, 2026	978-4-86-854110-3	—	—

==== Spin-off ====
A spin-off manga illustrated by Naoharu, titled Tales of the Tearmoon Empire: Servants' Tea Party (ティアムーン帝国物語～従者たちのお茶会～, Tiamūn Teikoku Monogatari: Jūshatachi no Ochakai), began serialization on TO Books' Corona Ex website on January 29, 2023. As of November 2025, the individual chapters have been collected into two tankōbon volumes.

No.	Release date	ISBN
1	October 14, 2023	978-4-86-699977-7
2	November 10, 2025	978-4-86-794752-4

==== Anthology ====
An anthology tankōbon volume was released on November 10, 2025, with illustrations by several artists.

No.	Release date	ISBN
1	November 10, 2025	978-4-86-794753-1

=== Stage ===
A theatrical adaptation of the novel series ran in Tokyo from September 9 to 13, 2020. It was directed by Yuki Shinome and written by Suika Suika. Kanako Hiramatsu, Reo Hotta, and Miyuki Torii performed the lead roles. A second theatrical performance with the same staff and cast as the first was shown in Tokyo from July 14 to July 19, 2021.

=== Anime ===
An anime television series adaptation was announced on September 6, 2022. It is produced by Silver Link and directed by Yūshi Ibe, with scripts written by Deko Akao, character designs handled by Mai Otsuka, and music composed by Kōji Fujimoto. The series aired from October 8 to December 24, 2023, on Tokyo MX, BS11 and MBS. The opening theme song is "Happy End Princess" (ハッピーエンドプリンセス) by Sumire Uesaka, while the ending theme song is "Queen of the Night" by KanoeRana. Crunchyroll streamed the series outside of Asia. Muse Communication licensed the series in Southeast Asia.

==== Episodes ====
No.	Title	Directed by (Note: Information is taken from the ending credits of each episode.)	Written by	Storyboarded by	Original release date
1	"The Princess Starting from the Chopping Block"; Transliteration: "Dantōdai kara Hajimaru Ohime-sama" (Japanese: 断頭台から始まるお姫様)	Yūshi Ibe	Deko Akao	Yūshi Ibe	October 8, 2023
After the collapse of the Tearmoon Empire, 17-year-old Princess Mia Luna Tearmoon, hated for her selfishness, is imprisoned and guillotined three years later. However, instead of dying, she awakens to find herself back in her 12-year-old body. She thinks the event was all a dream until she finds her diary stained with her blood from the execution and containing the entries she made prior to the event. Thinking that she had to stave off her date with the guillotine, she started by treating the chef she fired in her first life better, being reminded of her prison days being fed moldy bread and the vegetables she hated. The cost of the meal itself, according to the chef, suddenly reminded her of someone who said the same thing in her first life. Trying to remember who he was, she decided to eat something sweet, only that the maid who carried the cake tripped and fell, with her face ending up in the cake that plopped on its platter on the floor. Mia suppresses her anger when she finds out the maid is Anne, one of two loyal subordinates in her past life. She then designates her as her handmaid, clumsiness and all. After sending Anne to buy some sweets with a Tearmoon Empire gold crescent coin, which is worth more than sixty days of wages, Mia has now an idea of her food finances. That, combined with the entries in her diary which predicts a famine and the empire's collapse, set her to work. Still, she needed the help of someone in the Gold Moon Ministry, the government branch in charge of tax matters, whom she goes to visit. She has no idea yet who he is, aside from what he calls him: "the four-eyed nerd who was sent to the provinces." She finds him there, arguing with an official.
2	"Princess Mia Displays Her Smug Face"; Transliteration: "Mīa Hime, Doyagao o Hirō Suru" (Japanese: ミーア姫、ドヤ顔を披露する)	Yūshi Ibe	Deko Akao	Yūshi Ibe	October 15, 2023
Anne mistakenly thinks she's off to a romantic meeting, but Mia is actually at the Gold Moon Ministry to discuss the imperial food budget, remembering her past life memories. Mia remembers being irritated by Ludwig Hewitt's polite words in her previous life but needs his help to avoid trouble. Surprisingly, Ludwig is impressed by Mia's financial advice, leading him to become her consultant. Mia notices her diary entries changing, but she's still facing various problems. Meanwhile, Mia visits Ludwig, dressed by Anne to the nines with a valuable hairpin (thinking it's a romantic thing) and, on a visit to the poor New Moon District, asks for advice on preventing future disease outbreaks. Mia learns that proper nutrition and a hospital are needed, but it's costly. She selflessly offers her hairpin to fund these efforts, as she knows it is to be stolen from her in the future anyway. As Ludwig, using Mia's example asks the other nobles for help, she later visits Eris, Anne's frail sister and aspiring author, whom she remembers as the one who wrote the story Anne read to her in her prison cell in her first life. However, the story was not finished as Eris passed away. Mia prevents this by designating Eris as her personal author, later inadvertently spilling what Eris hasn't written yet. Mia later decides to go to boarding school to study more, as well as to build connections that would be useful in the event of a revolt.
3	"Princess Mia Sows Seeds"; Transliteration: "Mīa Hime, Tane o Maku" (Japanese: ミーア姫、種をまく)	Haruka Hirota	Deko Akao	Koji Sawai	October 22, 2023
To avoid trouble at Saint Noel Academy, Mia intends to steer clear of Prince Sion Sol Sunkland and Tiona Rudolvon, who, in her first life, caused her downfall. However, Mia ends up getting entwined with them after saving Tiona, the daughter of a lower-ranking noble, from bullies, which Prince Sion witnessed. At Belluga's baths, Mia encounters another person she also must avoid angering: Princess Rafina Orca Belluga, the daughter of the Duke of Belluga (where the academy is located) and the student council president who despised her in her first life. This time, they connect, and Mia receives an invitation to the welcoming dance ball from her. She plans to avoid a repeat of the disastrous dance ball in her past life and make important connections in case of a future revolt. Employing Anne's romance advice, she aims for Abel Remno, the second prince of the Kingdom of Remno, but, forgetting he's a tremendous flirt, he goes for another girl. Prince Sion finds Mia's handkerchief instead and, with Tiona's help, seeks her out. Sion asks Mia to be his dance partner. Trying to disengage from the two, Mia sees Abel being dragged to a corner for a scolding and seizes the opportunity to rescue him from his older brother's bullying.
4	"Shall We Dance?"; Transliteration: "Sharu Wī Dansu?" (Japanese: シャルウィーダンス？)	Yūshi Ibe	Deko Akao	Yūshi Ibe	October 29, 2023
Mia formally declines Sion's dance offer, but she later dances with him when Abel's insecurity prompts him to ask Sion to dance "as he goes to get some drinks." Meanwhile, Anne encounters Tiona's assistant Liora, who seeks help after she was kidnapped and taken to the North Tower. Sion's assistant Keithwood offers assistance, and they find out that Tiona is at the tower to retrieve her dress, as mentioned in a note she found in her room, as it was stolen. She finds it there, torn and dirty; it turns out she was lured here. Anne wastes no time and uses the money Mia gave her to buy Tiona a new dress and help with her makeup, ensuring Tiona's presence at the ball. As Tiona passes a note from Keithwood to Sion, Mia learns about the kidnapping attempt and, based on evidence found at the scene, she's a suspect, but Sion finds it impossible and even Tiona (the victim herself) clears her. Mia confronts the Tearmoon nobles studying in the academy, warning them of potential expulsion and incurring the wrath of Princess Rafina, which could cost Mia her head. She intervenes in their case by requesting Rafina's probation for the nobles and deportation for the attendants involved. Rafina, seeing it as a light punishment, misinterprets this as an act of mercy from "The Wisdom of the Tearmoon Empire," leading to an unexpected friendship between her and Mia, despite their animosity in her first life.
5	"Princess Mia Swoons"; Transliteration: "Mīa Hime, Kyun Tosuru" (Japanese: ミーア姫、キュンとする)	Yū Yabuuchi	Ryō Wakamatsu	Kazuaki Mōri	November 5, 2023
Mia becomes friends with Chloe Forkroad while looking for a reading buddy. Meanwhile, Mia learns to ride a horse for the reason that it is easier to escape a revolution by horse. Lin Malong, the head of the equestrian club, assigned Prince Abel as his riding instructor. Around that time the sword fighting tournament is also approaching, and it is traditional for girls to make a boxed lunch for a contestant whom they have feelings for. Mia tries the shortcut, buying a ready-made lunch for Abel, who is entering the contest, but all shops are fully booked. She had no other option but to work with others. Anne also enlisted the help of Tiona--as she plans to make one for Prince Sion. Mia and Abel's romance is slowly building up, and Abel is more fired up upon learning from Mia that she will make a boxed lunch for him at the tournament.
6	"The Sword Fighting Tournament: Prince Abel's Fight"; Transliteration: "Kenjutsu Taikai Aberu no Tatakai" (Japanese: 剣術大会 アベルの戦い)	Danzō Katō	Ryō Wakamatsu	Shinichi Watanabe	November 12, 2023
Keithwood helps avert culinary disaster as he helps Mia and the girls make boxed lunches for Abel and Sion. During the tournament, Abel manages to defeat his brother after the latter taunts the former at Mia's expense. He later fights Sion in a tight match, but rain suspends it, and both promise to settle it someday. Much to Mia's inner annoyance, as she badly wants to see Sion defeated.
7	"Princess Mia Sees Clearly"; Transliteration: "Mīa Hime, Saewataru" (Japanese: ミーア姫、冴え渡る)	Naoki Hishikawa	Shingo Irie	Kazuaki Mōri	November 19, 2023
While on end-of-term break, after dealing with the upcoming famine with the help of Ludwig and Chloe's father, she later visits New Moon City, where she meets the sickly young boy from before, now brimming with health, and gives her a unicorn hairpin that was a memento of his late mother, whom she later knew from the priest as one from a small tribe living in the remote Forest of Stillness--the Lulus, who, according to her diary, would later come into conflict with the empire. Engaging the Lulus is now unavoidable despite planning to avoid them. Meanwhile, Count Berman, a noble of her empire, egged by his peers and fueled by his envy for the Outcount Rudolvon's lands, plans to expand his lands by developing the Forest of Stillness. However, he fails to ask for Mia's approval as she expresses her desire to visit it. On her way to the forest, Ludwig tells her of the status of Berman's lands and, since it directly caused her to be executed in her previous life, she plans to stop it. At the detachment of soldiers guarding the forest, Mia meets the commander and faints, because he happens to be Dion Alaia, her executioner in her previous life. She tries to enter the forest with Dion and some of her guards escorting her, but she carelessly kicks a tree when she tripped on its roots, despite Dion warning her not to touch anything. It triggers an attack, causing Dion to grab Mia to safety, and in the process, she drops her unicorn hairpin--made from a tree from that same forest, which one of the attackers has found. Mia orders all of the soldiers to retreat to Berman's mansion, where, after learning from Ludwig of his plans, she orders a halt to his operations in the forest. And just as Dion interpreted her actions as an excuse to pull out all troops there, and she was about to head back home, Anne noticed Mia's unicorn hairpin missing.
8	"Princess Mia Grins Slyly"; Transliteration: "Mīa Hime, Azatoi Emi o Ukaberu" (Japanese: ミーア姫、あざとい笑みを浮かべる)	Yūsuke Onoda	Shingo Irie	Koji Sawai	November 26, 2023
Dion accompanies Mia to the same spot where she dropped her hairpin. She hesitates, not knowing that Ludwig talked to him about becoming one of her generals. At the spot, Dion notices that they are being watched, so he calls out to them, which so happens to be a few of the Lulu tribes folk along with their chief. The chief asks where she got the hairpin she lost, which is in his hand. As Dion is ready to defend Mia, and the chief awaits her answer, Liora shows up among the Lulus, vouching for her. The chief tells the story behind the hairpin. Mia mentioned the kid who gave it to her, whom she knew later to be the chief's grandson. Though the tribesmen did not want to believe it since Mia kicked one of the trees, the chief decided to believe her, seeing that Mia came practically alone with only one guard, and knew from Dion that she ordered the soldiers to pull out of the forest. Mia offers to take his grandson back. When Mia is summoned by her father the Emperor the next day, she seizes the opportunity to request that the forest be made part of her lands. In addition, the emperor orders that a city named "Princess Town" be built by Count Berman on land near the forest. Ludwig has momentary doubts but is surprised when Berman agrees wholeheartedly. A few days later, a letter from Tiona arrives, asking for her patronage concerning her brother Cyril so that he could enter Saint Noel. She knew Cyril Rudolvon from her past life as the genius who developed a new variety of wheat under Princess Rafina's protection in Belluga. Knowing this, she, on her visit to the Rudolvons, proposed instead for him to study in the new school she is planning to establish in Princess Town, which would also cater to common folk, those who cannot afford proper schooling, and even the Lulus; and to prevent brain drain in Tearmoon (basically, keeping Cyril in the empire). She also asked Count Rudolvon to stock up on wheat for distribution to the people in case of famine under her name as a favor, which was timely given that the major nobles called his previous attempts to do so "an act of rebellion against the empire." Later, Mia checks her diary and is surprised that it vanished, meaning she has successfully averted her impending execution. However, as she rejoices, dark forces working behind the scenes who have been trying to ruin the Tearmoon Empire see Mia as a threat as they put their plans on hold and aim for another target.
9	"Princess Mia's (Love-Focused) Choice"; Transliteration: "Mīa Hime（Renainō）no Sentaku" (Japanese: ミーア姫（恋愛脳）の選択)	Haruka Hirota	Ryō Wakamatsu	Goichi Iwahata	December 3, 2023
Upon Mia's return to Saint Noel from term break, news about a brewing revolution in Remno came to her. She wanted to stay away from trouble, but, Wanting to be with Abel, Mia asked for help, with Sion, Keithwood, and Tiona joining her; with Mia urging Anne to stay and do her task. They proceed to Remno using the Forkroad caravan into the city as a cover. Bandits, however, attack the carriage where Mia, Sion, and Tiona are; and in the process, Mia falls through the carriage's rear. Sion follows her as they fall into a river. Mia asks him in front of a bonfire (as they were drying themselves) as to what he'd do if Abel raised his hands in oppression on his subjects, bearing in mind her first life. He is torn, but, eventually, Sion thinks Mia is suggesting that they stop Abel from doing so. Walking the long road to Remno, Sion would later analyze that their attackers couldn't be ordinary bandits, but professional soldiers; and knowing which carriage they are in could be due to an information leak. Just as Mia is about to grab a toxic fungus because she is hungry, a hunter named Mujik from the nearby Doni Village stopped her. He welcomes them into his house as Sion plans to join the next caravan into Remno the next day with her. During meals, Mia thought it's odd that a revolution is brewing despite the fact that the famine is three years away and, according to Mujik, the Doni Village has no problems pertaining to insurrections whatsoever. Meanwhile, at Remno, a noble receives a letter.
10	"Princess Mia is Kidnapped!"; Transliteration: "Mīa Hime, Yūkai Jiken!" (Japanese: ミーア姫、誘拐事件！)	Naoki Hishikawa	Shingo Irie	Kazuaki Mōri	December 10, 2023
Ludwig receives news of the potential revolution in Remno spurred by increased taxes. Dion suspects someone is inciting the revolt but, seeing that Mia is in the kingdom right now, hesitates to dispatch her guards, fearing it may be seen as an invasion. Meanwhile, Mia and Sion travel with a caravan into Remno, where the Adamant Infantry, Remno's elite unit, is deployed but hasn't engaged in battle. Meanwhile, Graham, a member of Sunkland's intelligence agency, the Wind Crows, working in secret as a civil servant in Remno, intercepts Mia's love letter and attempts to decode it, even if it IS just a plain love letter. Learning of Mia and Sion's mission to infiltrate Remno from Monica, a member of the Black Crows masquerading as a maid, Graham, deeming the plan to bring Tearmoon down as a failure, resorts to spreading false information to incite a rebellion. Monica, ordered to deliver the false message, switches the false information with the real one, using crows for communication after an encounter with Prince Abel. As Mia and Sion reach Remno, Mia is kidnapped by revolutionaries. She meets Lynsha, who pleads for Mia to stop the revolution and save her brother, the leader. Lynsha tells Mia that Jem, one of them, sees her as a threat to their revolution. Sion intercepts them on the way to bringing Mia to Jem, and learns that the revolution's true aim is Count Donovan's release and not the lowering of taxes. Just then, the revolutionaries, known as the Blue Caps, gather in front of, and take over, the mayor's manor, and Lynsha's brother, Lambert, who is leading them all, contemplates killing Mia and Sion upon noticing them, but decides against it as he is persuaded by his sister to listen to the two.
11	"A Reunion, a Duel, and..." Transliteration: "Saikai to Kettō to......" (Japanese: 再会と決闘と……)	Masahiro Hosoda	Deko Akao	Masahiro Hosoda	December 17, 2023
Lambert welcomes Sion and Mia into the seized mayor's manor, aware of Sion's true identity, and expresses his aim to gain support from Sunkland. Sion acknowledges the difficulty in doing so but doesn't underestimate Lambert. Lambert, however, views Mia as a threat to the revolution and believes she must be silenced. The next day, the rebels are alerted when a royal force led by Prince Abel started to move. As Jem persuades the imprisoned Count Donovan to join their cause, Abel receives Sion and Mia in their temporary headquarters, suspecting Mia has a larger agenda. Sion, seeing this as Remno's opportunity to rouse the Adamant Infantry, challenges Abel, partly to impress Mia, catching her off guard. Mia attempts to stop the two dueling princes in vain as Dion intervenes, and Ludwig arrives with Anne, taking control of the situation for her. Mia, recalling her experiences from her past life, suspects a plot to divide Remno and involve Sunkland. Mia reveals the rebellion's true motive—to free Count Donovan, not in protest of higher taxes. Keithwood and Tiona arrive with news, thanks to Monica's messenger crow, emphasizing the complexities of the unfolding situation.
12	"To Keep What Was Preciously Grown from Withering"; Transliteration: "Daiji ni Sodatetekita Mono o Karasanai Tame ni" (Japanese: 大事に育ててきたものを枯らさないために)	Yūshi Ibe	Deko Akao	Koji Sawai	December 24, 2023
Upon hearing Keithwood's report, Sion apologizes to Abel about the instigators of the rebellion in Remno: a rogue unit within Sunkland's intelligence agency, the Wind Crows (the Albus). Abel explained himself for leading his soldiers: just him showing concern for his subjects by using the military to control the situation. Thanking Mia, he has found a way to stop this ridiculous conflict. But since Sion still feels regret, Mia "punished" his mistake with a kick from her, for which he thanked her for it. With Lynsha and Lambert's help, they located Chancellor Dasayev in the town of Xenia and proceeds to rescue him. Mia is apprehensive, knowing that Jem, the man who is the cause of the ruckus, is in the same building where the chancellor is held. Sion, now fully knowing of the schemes of the Albus, routes their hideout and rescues Dasayev. But not before going through Jem, who momentarily had Mia with the blade of his sword. Certain circumstances involving her spilt shampoo caused Mia to slip and kick Jem in the groin. After subduing Jem and his co-conspirators, Sion and Abel thinks that executing them will leave them a bad taste in the mouth, but she thinks doing so will send her back to the guillotine--something she always considered, so, despite really not forgiving them, and because she enjoys her current life, and partly because Jem really pushed her with him daring her, she suggested handing them all over to Rafina for a three-year lecture. With the troubles in Remno over, Mia asked Tiona and Ludwig to venture into the capital and ask that Lynsha, Lambert, and the main rebels be granted clemency. Mia and the others return to the academy. Happy days have come to Mia, but the future is still open to change, with the effects of the seeds of hope she planted still awaiting its manifestation.

== Reception ==
Rebecca Silverman from Anime News Network praised the first volume for its illustrations and tone, while criticizing the authorial interjections.

The manga was nominated for the 2021 Next Manga Award in the web manga category.

As of September 2023, the series has sold over 1.7 million copies between its digital and print releases.
