= Butareba: The Story of a Man Turned into a Pig =

Japanese light novel series

- First light novel volume cover

豚のレバーは加熱しろ (Buta no Rebā wa Kanetsu Shiro)
- Genre: Isekai
- Light novel
- Written by: Takuma Sakai
- Illustrated by: Asagi Tōsaka
- Published by: ASCII Media Works
- English publisher: NA: J-Novel Club
- Imprint: Dengeki Bunko
- Original run: March 10, 2020 – March 8, 2024
- Volumes: 9
- Manga
- Written by: Takuma Sakai
- Illustrated by: Minami
- Published by: ASCII Media Works
- English publisher: NA: J-Novel Club
- Magazine: Dengeki Maoh
- Original run: August 27, 2020 – present
- Volumes: 9
- Anime television series
- Directed by: Masayuki Takahashi
- Written by: Deko Akao
- Music by: Kenichiro Suehiro; Mayuko
- Studio: Project No.9
- Licensed by: NA: Aniplex of America; SEA: Muse Communication
- Original network: Tokyo MX, GYT, GTV, BS11, ytv, CBC, AT-X
- Original run: October 8, 2023 – February 6, 2024
- Episodes: 12
- icon

Butareba: The Story of a Man Turned into a Pig (豚のレバーは加熱しろ, Buta no Rebā wa Kanetsu Shiro), also known as Heat the Pig Liver, is a Japanese light novel series written by Takuma Sakai and illustrated by Asagi Tōsaka. ASCII Media Works published nine volumes under their Dengeki Bunko imprint from March 2020 to March 2024. A manga adaptation with art by Minami has been serialized in ASCII Media Works' seinen manga magazine Dengeki Maoh since August 2020. An anime television series adaptation produced by Project No.9 aired from October 2023 to February 2024.

== Plot ==
After finding himself unconscious after eating pig liver, a Japanese man finds himself in another world called Mesteria, having been reincarnated as a pig. There, he encounters Jess, a kind-hearted girl who is a member of the Yethma, a group that is forced to live wearing collars. Jess aims to head to Mesteria's capital, but after learning about the pig's past life, she lets him accompany her. The two go on a journey to the capital, with the two hoping that their trip there could help him become a human again.

== Characters ==
Pig (豚, Buta)
Voiced by: Yoshitsugu Matsuoka (PV, anime), Satoi Shibuya (audio drama)
He was previously a 19-year-old otaku who finds himself in another world called Mesteria as a pig after falling unconscious after eating pork liver. He has a somewhat perverted personality. When he returns to the real world after being put to death in Mesteria, he writes the story of his adventures as a web novel, which gains popularity online. However, he ends up returning to Mesteria.
Jess (ジェス, Jesu)
Voiced by: Tomori Kusunoki (PV, anime), Kana Ichinose (audio drama)
A 16-year-old girl who aiming to visit the king. As a member of the Yethma people, she is always wearing a collar. She is able to telepathically understand Pig's thoughts and feelings, and is aiming to help him turn back into a human.
Ceres (セレス, Seresu)
Voiced by: Miyu Tomita (anime)
A 13-year old girl and a member of the Yethma people. She has feelings for Nott and is opposed to him accompanying Jess and Pig to the capital.
Nott (ノット, Notto)
Voiced by: Kent Itō (anime)
Brace (ブレース, Buresu)
Voiced by: Mamiko Noto (anime)

== Media ==
=== Light novel ===
In September 2023, J-Novel Club announced that they had licensed the novels for English publication.

No.	Original release date	Original ISBN	English release date	English ISBN
1	March 10, 2020	978-4-04-913013-3	December 7, 2023	978-1-7183-0944-9
2	August 7, 2020	978-4-04-913217-5	February 22, 2024	978-1-7183-0946-3
3	December 10, 2020	978-4-04-913455-1	May 19, 2024	978-1-7183-0948-7
4	May 8, 2021	978-4-04-913835-1	August 6, 2024	978-1-71-830950-0
5	October 8, 2021	978-4-04-914045-3	November 19, 2024	978-1-71-830952-4
6	May 10, 2022	978-4-04-914351-5	March 11, 2025	978-1-71-830954-8
7	December 9, 2022	978-4-04-914749-0	September 3, 2025	978-1-71-830956-2
8	October 6, 2023	978-4-04-915080-3	March 18, 2026	978-1-71-830958-6
9	March 8, 2024	978-4-04-915438-2	September 16, 2026	978-1-71-830960-9

=== Manga ===
A manga adaptation with art by Minami has been serialized in ASCII Media Works' seinen manga magazine Dengeki Maoh since August 2020. Its chapters have been collected in nine tankōbon volumes as of July 2026.

During their Anime NYC 2023 panel, J-Novel Club announced that they also licensed the manga for English publication.

No.	Original release date	Original ISBN	English release date	English ISBN
1	February 27, 2021	978-4-04-913657-9	February 14, 2024	978-1-7183-3304-8
2	September 27, 2021	978-4-04-913982-2	May 15, 2024	978-1-7183-3305-5
3	July 27, 2022	978-4-04-914318-8	August 14, 2024	978-1-7183-3306-2
4	February 27, 2023	978-4-04-914883-1	November 27, 2024	978-1-7183-3307-9
5	September 26, 2023	978-4-04-915254-8	March 19, 2025	978-1-7183-3308-6
6	April 26, 2024	978-4-04-915744-4	June 11, 2025	978-1-7183-3309-3
7	October 25, 2024	978-4-04-916080-2	September 3, 2025	978-1-7183-3310-9
8	November 27, 2025	978-4-04-916815-0	July 22, 2026	978-1-7183-3311-6
9	July 27, 2026	978-4-04-952351-5	—	—

=== Anime ===
On December 11, 2021, during the "Dengeki Bunko Winter Festival 2021" livestream event, an anime television series adaptation was announced. It is produced by Project No.9 and directed by Masayuki Takahashi, with scripts written by Deko Akao, character designs handled by Susumu Watanabe, and music composed by Kenichiro Suehiro and Mayuko. The series aired from October 8, 2023, to February 6, 2024, on Tokyo MX and other networks. (Note: Tokyo MX lists the series premiere on October 7 at 24:30, which is effectively October 8 at 12:30 a.m. JST.) The anime series mainly covers the first volume of the novel series. The opening theme song is "Watashi ga Warau Riyū wa" (私が笑う理由は; "The Reason I Laugh Is") by Asca, while the ending theme song is "Hitori Janai yo" (ひとりじゃないよ; "I'm Not Alone") by Myuk. In December 2023, it was announced that the 12th and final episode would be delayed, which was eventually broadcast on February 6, 2024.

In North America, the series is licensed by Aniplex of America, and streamed by Crunchyroll outside of Asia. Muse Communication licensed the series in Southeast Asia.

No.	Title	Directed by	Written by	Storyboarded by	Original release date
1	"Otakus Enjoy Being Treated Like Pigs"; Transliteration: "Otaku wa Bishōjo ni Buta Atsukai Sareru to Yorokobu" (Japanese: オタクは美少女に豚扱いされると喜ぶ)	Kentarō Tanaka	Deko Akao	Masayuki Takahashi	October 8, 2023
2	"Even a Pig Will Dance If You Flatter Them Enough"; Transliteration: "Buta mo Odaterya Dansu Suru" (Japanese: 豚もおだてりゃダンスする)	Akira Katō	Yūsuke Kaneko	Yū Nobuta	October 15, 2023
3	"You Must Not Fall in Love with Your Oshi"; Transliteration: "Oshi ni Gachikoi Shite wa Naranai" (Japanese: 推しにガチ恋してはならない)	Michita Shiraishi	Yūsuke Kaneko	Mie Ōishi	October 22, 2023
4	"Be Careful How You Ride a Pig"; Transliteration: "Buta no Nori-kata ni wa Chūi Shiro" (Japanese: 豚の乗り方には注意しろ)	Shin'ichi Fukumoto	Deko Akao	Chihiro Kumano	October 29, 2023
5	"Nearly All Handsome Guys Are Scumbags"; Transliteration: "Ikemen wa Jutchūhakku Gesu Yarō" (Japanese: イケメンは十中八九ゲス野郎)	Ying Chen Lin	Deko Akao	Masayuki Takahashi	November 5, 2023
6	"Honest Feelings Should Be Shouted Out Loud"; Transliteration: "Omoi wa Sunao ni Sakebu Beshi" (Japanese: 想いは素直に叫ぶべし)	Takashi Kojima; Masato Uchibori	Yūsuke Kaneko	Noriaki Saitō	November 12, 2023
7	"No Two Flowers Are the Same"; Transliteration: "Hitotsu Toshite Onaji Hana wa Nai" (Japanese: 一つとして同じ花はない)	Shinji Itō	Yūsuke Kaneko	Yasuyuki Ōishi	November 19, 2023
8	"Don't Laugh at Someone's Prayers"; Transliteration: "Hito no Inori o Warau na" (Japanese: 人の祈りを笑うな)	Kimihiro Satō	Deko Akao	Noriaki Saitō	November 26, 2023
9	"Live and Go Set Your Feet on that Ground"; Transliteration: "Ikite Sono Tsuchi o Fumi ni Ike" (Japanese: 生きてその土を踏みにいけ)	Masayuki Takahashi	Yūsuke Kaneko	Kai Hasako	December 10, 2023
10	"There's Always a Reason Why Things Are the Way They Are"; Transliteration: "Kimari ni wa Kanarazu Riyū ga Aru" (Japanese: 決まりには必ず理由がある)	Masayuki Takahashi	Yūsuke Kaneko	Masayuki Takahashi	December 17, 2023
11	"Keep Rewards for When They Really Count"; Transliteration: "Go Hōbi wa Koko zo Toiu Toki ni" (Japanese: ご褒美はここぞというときに)	Masayuki Takahashi	Deko Akao	Masayuki Takahashi	December 24, 2023
12	"Heat The Pig Liver"; Transliteration: "Buta no Rebā wa Kanetsu Shiro" (Japanese: 豚のレバーは加熱しろ)	Masayuki Takahashi	Deko Akao	Chihiro Kumano	February 6, 2024

== Reception ==
The light novel series won the gold prize (effectively second place) in the 26th Dengeki Novel Prize in 2019.

Game Rant stated that the anime adaptation "is not a very good anime by any stretch of the imagination", though they noted its uniqueness in having a pig as a protagonist.

== See also ==
- The Demon Sword Master of Excalibur Academy, another light novel series with the same illustrator
- Girly Air Force, another light novel series with the same illustrator
- The Many Sides of Voice Actor Radio, the winner of the grand prize (effectively first place) of the 26th Dengeki Novel Prize
- Therefore, First Love Was Proven, another light novel series with the same author and illustrator
