= 13th Seiyu Awards =

2019 voice acting award in Tokyo

- Awarded for: Voice acting in Japan
- Date: March 9, 2019
- Location: JOQR Media Plus Hall; Minato, Tokyo
- Country: Japan

Highlights
- Best Lead Actor: Yuma Uchida
- Best Lead Actress: Yūko Sanpei
- Website: www.seiyuawards.jp

The 13th Seiyu Awards was held on March 9, 2019 at the JOQR Media Plus Hall in Minato, Tokyo. The winners of the Merit Awards, the Kei Tomiyama Award, the Kazue Takahashi Award, and the Synergy Award were announced on February 19, 2019. The rest of the winners were announced on the ceremony day. This year, there were four new award categories, which include the Foreign Movie/Series Award, the Game Award, the Influencer Award, and the Most Valuable Seiyu Award.

Winners	Agency	Highlight Works
Best Actor in a Leading Role
Yuma Uchida	I'm Enterprise	Ash Lynx (Anime TV series Banana Fish)
Best Actress in a Leading Role
Yūko Sanpei	Axl-One	Boruto Uzumaki (Anime TV series Boruto: Naruto Next Generations)
Best Actors in Supporting Roles
Tōru Furuya	Aoni Production	Rei Furuya (Anime TV series Case Closed)
Kenta Miyake	81 Produce	All Might (Anime TV series My Hero Academia 3)
Best Actresses in Supporting Roles
Yū Serizawa	81 Produce	Shera L. Greenwood (Anime TV series How Not to Summon a Demon Lord)
Nao Tōyama	INTENTION	Rin Shima (Anime TV series Laid-Back Camp)
Best New Actors
Kōhei Amasaki	I'm Enterprise	Haruo Yaguchi (Anime TV series Hi Score Girl)
Mark Ishii	Just Production	Chrono Shindō (Anime TV series Cardfight!! Vanguard G: Z)
Fukushi Ochiai	Aoni Production	Natsunosuke Bonda (Anime TV series Gurazeni)
Shugo Nakamura	Across Entertainment	Teru Tendō (Anime TV series The Idolmaster SideM)
Best New Actresses
Manaka Iwami	Pro-Fit	Maquia (Anime film Maquia: When the Promised Flower Blooms)
Tomori Kusunoki	Sony Music Artists	Llenn (Anime TV series Sword Art Online Alternative Gun Gale Online)
Coco Hayashi	81 Produce	Mirai Momoyama (Anime TV series Kiratto Pri Chan)
Rina Honnizumi	81 Produce	Saaya Yakushiji (Anime TV series Hugtto! PreCure)
Kaede Hondo	I'm Enterprise	Kanami Eto (Anime TV series Katana Maidens: Toji No Miko)
Singing Award
Winner	Members	Agency
Hypnosis Mic	Subaru Kimura; Haruki Ishiya; Kōhei Amasaki; Shintaro Asanuma; Wataru Komada; Shinichiro Kamio; Yusuke Shirai; Sōma Saitō; Yukihiro Nozuyama; Show Hayami; Ryuichi Kijima; Kento Itō	
Personality Award
Winner	Agency	Highlight Works
Junichi Suwabe	Haikyō	

Merit Award
Winners	Agency
Kenichi Ogata	Office Umikaze
Hisako Kyōda	Haikyō
Kei Tomiyama Memorial Award
Winner	Agency
Kappei Yamaguchi	Gokū
Kazue Takahashi Memorial Award
Winner	Agency
Mika Kanai	Ken Production
Synergy Award
Winner
Pop Team Epic
Special Award
Winner
Chibi Maruko-chan
Kids/Family Award
Winner	Agency
Tarako	Troubadour Musque Office
Foreign Movie/Series Award
Winner	Agency
Toshiyuki Morikawa	Axl-One
Yūko Kaida	Ken Production
Game Award
Winner	Agency
Nao Tōyama	INTENTION
Influencer Award
Winner	Agency
Yoshino Nanjō	N3 Entertainment
Most Valuable Seiyū Award
Winner	Agency
Hiroshi Kamiya	Aoni Production
