= Run Girls, Run! =

Japanese voice-actor group

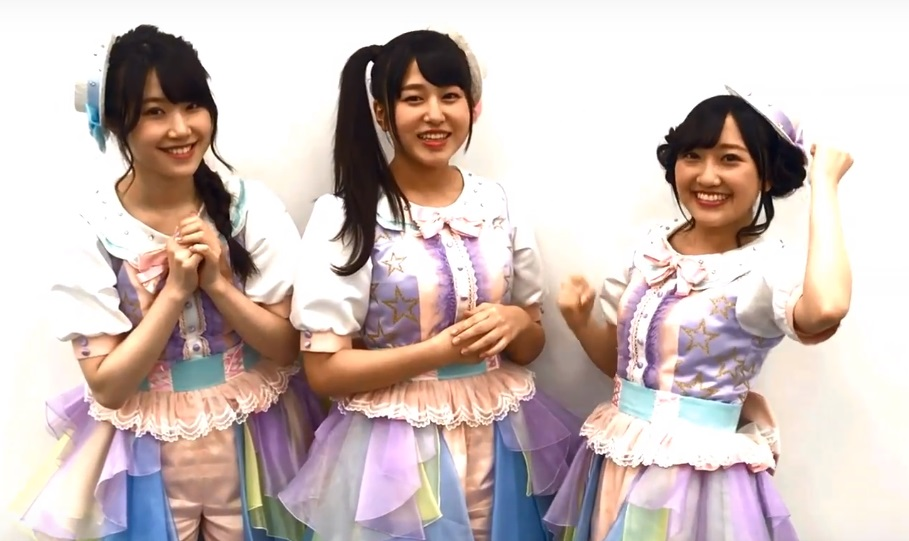

Background information
- Origin: Japan
- Genres: J-pop, Anisong
- Years active: 2017–2023
- Labels: Avex Group; 81 Produce
- Past members: Coco Hayashi; Yuuka Morishima; Nanami Atsugi
- Website: rungirlsrun.jp

Run Girls, Run! is a Japanese voice-actor group consisting of Coco Hayashi, Yuuka Morishima, and Nanami Atsugi associated with Avex Pictures and 81 Produce. The group as artists released songs collaborating with anime works such as Wake Up, Girls! New Chapter, Kiratto Pri Chan, and others. They appear as voice actor in those programs.

== History ==
Coco, Yūka and Nanami have passed the audition jointly held by Avex and 81 Produce in 2017 (avex x 81 Produce Wake Up, Girls! 3rd Anime Song Vocal Audition) and formed Run Girls, Run! at July 30, 2017.

Run Girls, Run! appeared in Wake Up, Girls! New Chapter as a group with the same unit name, and their first song KAKERU x KAKERU was used in it,.

On February 28, 2018, they released the debut single Slide Ride as the opening theme of Death March to the Parallel World Rhapsody.

In the anime Kiratto Pri Chan airing from April 2018 to May 2021, they voiced Mirai Momoyama, Rinka Aoba, and Mel Shido. They also sang all of the opening themes of Kiratto Pri Chan.

On July 25, 2022, it was announced on their official website that the group would disband on March 31, 2023.

== Members ==
- Coco Hayashi
- Yuuka Morishima, the leader
- Nanami Atsugi

== Discography ==
=== Albums ===
Title	Album details	Charts
Title	Album details	JPN
Run Girls, World!	Released: May 20, 2020; Formats: CD, CD/Blu-ray, digital download	22
Get Set, Go!	Released: April 6, 2022; Formats: CD, digital download	25

=== Singles ===
No.	Title	Release date	Standard Item Number		Charts
No.	Title	Release date	CD/DVD CD/Blu-ray	CD	JPN
1	"Slide Ride" (スライドライド)	February 28, 2018	EYCA-11830/B	EYCA-11831	44
2	"Kiratto Start" (キラッとスタート)	May 2, 2018	EYCA-11865/B	EYCA-11866	39
3	"Go! Up! Stardom!" (Go! Up! スターダム！)	October 31, 2018	EYCA-12056/B	EYCA-12057	50
4	"Break the Blue!!/Never-ending!!"	February 6, 2019	EYCA-12225/B	EYCA-12226	31
5	"Diamond Smile" (ダイヤモンドスマイル)	May 29, 2019	EYCA-12530/B	EYCA-12531	51
6	"Share the Light"	November 27, 2019	EYCA-12731/B	EYCA-12732	38
7	"Luminance Princess" (ルミナンスプリンセス)	December 16, 2020	EYCA-13176/B	EYCA-13177	38
8	"Dreaming Channel!" (ドリーミング☆チャンネル！)	May 19, 2021	EYCA-13350/B; EYCA-13351/B	EYCA-13352	40
