= Coco Hayashi =

Japanese voice actress

- 林 鼓子
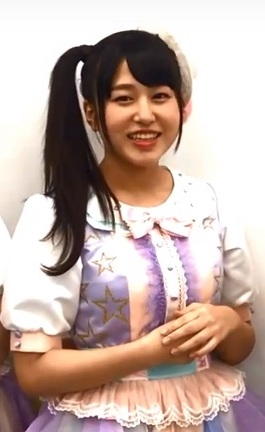
- Hayashi in 2018
- Born: 15 May 2002 (age 24); Hamamatsu, Shizuoka, Japan
- Other name: Hayamaru
- Occupations: Actress; voice actress; drummer
- Years active: 2017–present
- Agent(s): 81 Produce (2018–2023); Freelance (2023, 2025） mitt management (2023–2025); LIBERTE (2025–)
- Notable work: Wake Up, Girls! New Chapter! as Ayumi Hayashi; Kiratto Pri☆Chan as Mirai Momoyama; Love Live! Nijigasaki High School Idol Club as Setsuna Yūki/Nana Nakagawa; BanG Dream! as Taki Shiina
- Awards: Best New Actress Award at the 13th Seiyu Awards

Coco Hayashi (林 鼓子, Hayashi Coco/Hayashi Koko; born 15 May 2002) is a Japanese actress who specializes in voice acting. She voiced Ayumi Hayashi in Wake Up, Girls! New Chapter!, Mirai Momoyama in Kiratto Pri Chan, and Taki Shiina in the BanG Dream! franchise, where she also serves as the drummer for the band MyGO!!!!!.

== Biography ==
Hayashi was born in Hamamatsu, Shizuoka Prefecture, to an anime-loving father. She was a member of Space Craft Junior as a child and appeared in Oha Suta by 2013. She participated in a live event of voice actress Nana Mizuki and aspired to be a voice actress influenced by her performance. After receiving the recommendation of her father, she successfully auditioned in 2017 avex×81produce Wake Up, Girls! AUDITION. Her career started when she starred as Ayumi Hayashi in the 2017 Wake Up, Girls! spinoff New Chapter!, and she formed the unit Run Girls, Run! with Yuuka Morishima and Nanami Atsugi. In 2018, she voiced the main character of Kiratto Pri Chan, Mirai Momoyama, and she starred in King of Prism: Shiny Seven Stars as Nagisa Takahashi. She also won the Best New Actress Award at the 13th Seiyu Awards alongside Kaede Hondo, Rina Honnizumi, Manaka Iwami, and Tomori Kusunoki.

Hayashi became involved with the Love Live! franchise in 2019, when she voiced a schoolgirl in the Love Live! Sunshine!! film. On 25 March 2023, she was revealed as the new voice actress of Setsuna Yuki from Nijigasaki High School Idol Club, succeeding Tomori Kusunoki.

On 2 April 2025, she announced her departure from mitt management after her contract expired. After a brief freelance stint, Hayashi joined LIBERTE on 31 May.

== Filmography ==
=== Anime ===
2017

- Wake Up, Girls! New Chapter!, Ayumi Hayashi

2018

- Kiratto Pri Chan, Mirai Momoyama

2019

- King of Prism: Shiny Seven Stars, Nagisa Takahashi
- The Promised Neverland, Ugen, Damdin, and Rossy

2020

- Nekopara, child

2023

- MF Ghost, Mami Satō
- Love Live! Nijigasaki High School Idol Club, Setsuna Yuki/Nana Nakagawa
- BanG Dream! It's MyGO!!!!!, Taki Shiina
- Tonikawa: Over the Moon for You – High School Days, Haru Miyako

2025

- BanG Dream! Ave Mujica, Taki Shiina
- City the Animation, Kamome Adatara

=== Film ===
2018

- PriPara & Kiratto Pri☆Chan Movie: Sparkling Memorial Live, Mirai Momoyama

2019

- Love Live! Sunshine!! The School Idol Movie: Over the Rainbow, schoolgirl A

=== Video games ===
2021

- Blue Archive, Sora

2023

- Love Live! School Idol Festival 2: Miracle Live!, Setsuna Yuki
- BanG Dream! Girls Band Party!, Taki Shiina

2024

- Assault Lily: Last Bullet, Shiera Tada

2026

- Kyoto Xanadu, Fuka Rikudo
- BanG Dream! Our Notes, Taki Shiina
