= Nezumi =

Nezumi may refer to the following:

== Real life ==
- The Japanese word 鼠 meaning "rat" or "mouse"
- Nezumi Kozō was the nickname of a thief in the 19th century
- Previous name of Yuuki Matsuda

== Software ==
- Now-defunct Ragnarok Online server emulator fork of Athena, released under the GNU General Public License written by Mark Karpeles.

== Fiction ==
- Nezumi, race of anthropomorphic rat creatures in the Magic: The Gathering and Legend of the Five Rings trading card games
- Nezumi, one of the two main characters of the novel, manga and anime No. 6
- Nezumi (One Piece), a minor character in the Japanese anime and manga One Piece
- Nezumi, a character in Majisuka Gakuen, portrayed by Mayu Watanabe.
