= Yuki Masuda (disambiguation) =

Yuki Masuda (born 1973) is a female voice actor born in Atami.

Yuki Masuda may also refer to:

- Yuki Matsuda (speed skater) (born 1987), Chinese speed skater
- Yūki Masuda (born 1979), male voice actor from Tokyo
- Yuuki Matsuda, voice actor from Tokyo, real name Takehiro Matsuda
- Yuki Matsuda (singer) (born 1987), daughter of actor Yusaku Matsuda and actress Miyuki Matsuda
