= Girly Air Force =

Japanese light novel series

- Light novel cover volume 1 featuring Gripen

ガーリー・エアフォース (Gārī Ea Fōsu)
- Genre: Action, military science fiction
- Light novel
- Written by: Kōji Natsumi
- Illustrated by: Asagi Tōsaka
- Published by: ASCII Media Works
- Imprint: Dengeki Bunko
- Original run: September 10, 2014 – present
- Volumes: 12
- Manga
- Illustrated by: Takahiro Seguchi
- Published by: Kadokawa Shoten
- Magazine: Monthly Shōnen Ace
- Original run: October 26, 2018 – May 26, 2019
- Volumes: 2
- Anime television series
- Directed by: Katsumi Ono
- Produced by: Takaaki Yuasa; Tomoyuki Oowada; Hirotaka Kaneko; Souji Miyagi; Yuuya Yoshida; Shouta Watase; Hideyuki Saida; Daiju Meguro; Manami Kabashima; Toshikatsu Saitou; Fumio Kaneko
- Written by: Shingo Nagai
- Music by: I've Sound
- Studio: Satelight
- Licensed by: Crunchyroll (streaming); NA: Discotek Media (home video)
- Original network: AT-X, Tokyo MX, BS11, SUN, AbemaTV
- Original run: January 10, 2019 – March 28, 2019
- Episodes: 12

Girly Air Force (ガーリー・エアフォース, Gārī Ea Fōsu) is a Japanese light novel series written by Kōji Natsumi and illustrated by Asagi Tōsaka. A manga adaptation by Takahiro Seguchi launched in Monthly Shōnen Ace in October 2018, and an anime television series adaptation by Satelight aired from January to March 2019.

== Plot ==
Earth has come under attack by the Xi (ザイ, Zai), a mysterious "armed group" using highly advanced weapon systems far superior to any existing human-developed military technology. A young Chinese-Japanese teenager named Kei Narutani and his Chinese friend Minghua Song, both living in Shanghai, are forced to evacuate to Japan when the city is attacked by the Xi. During their escape by sea, several Xi fighters begin sinking the evacuation fleet when Kei suddenly witnesses the Xi being repelled by a strange fighter plane. When the plane subsequently crashes, Kei rushes to aid the pilot, but is surprised to find a pretty girl at the controls.

After arriving in Japan, Kei begins investigating the origins of the strange plane, and before long he is captured by Japanese secret service agents. He learns from them that it was a Swedish fighter retrofitted with special technology developed by the JASDF. In order to combat the Xi, their technology—HiMAT (Highly Maneuverable Aircraft Technology) and EPCM (Electronic Perceptory Counter-Measures)—was reverse-engineered and applied to existing fighter models, codenamed "Daughters"; in order to function properly, the Daughters require autonomous interface units called "Anima", cyborg girls who are grown around salvaged Xi parts. The girl Kei encountered, named Gripen (after the plane she flies), is one such Anima unit who formed an emotional attachment to him when he came to her aid. When her supervising developer notices that effect, he invites Kei into the Anima project to act as Gripen's partner in order to boost her flight performance and prevent her from being scrapped.

== Characters ==
Kei Narutani (鳴谷慧, Narutani Kei)
Voiced by: Ryōta Ōsaka
A Chinese-Japanese teenager who was living in Shanghai before evacuating from a Xi attack. After witnessing Gripen fighting a pair of Xi fighters and then crashing into the sea, he impulsively comes to her aid, which creates an emotional bond between them. With his mother, an air show pilot, killed in a Xi ambush attack, he decides to join the Japan Air Self-Defense Force to take revenge on them. After becoming privy to the Anima project, he becomes Gripen's weapon systems officer and emotional anchor.
Gripen (グリペン, Guripen)
Voiced by: Yuuka Morishima
A pink-haired Anima flying a Swedish JAS 39F Gripen produced by Saab. She suffers from an inherent emotional defect which leaves her scatterbrained and lacking a sense of purpose. When they first meet, Gripen forms an emotional dependency on Kei, which is noted by Yashirodōri; Kei is taken into the program to provide her with motivation to fight the Xi. Her call sign is "Barbie 01".
Eagle (イーグル, Īguru)
Voiced by: Hitomi Ōwada
A blonde Anima who flies an F-15J Eagle produced by Mitsubishi Heavy Industries. She has a perky and capricious personality and is also a very talented combat pilot. Immediately upon meeting Kei, she takes a close personal interest in him. She also adores Yashirodōri as a father. Her call sign is "Barbie 02".
Phantom (ファントム, Fantomu)
Voiced by: Shiori Izawa
An Anima with the call sign "Barbie 03", who arrives at Komatsu separately from Gripen and Eagle. She flies an RF-4EJ Phantom II and is the first Anima created by the JSDF. Although trained for combat, her specialty is tactical reconnaissance; because of this, she is also able to interface with Anima information channels to obtain or manipulate information. Because of her status as the first ever Anima, and the self-reliance forced upon her when it was assumed that no other Anima would be created, she is very condescending to her counterparts, causing friction within the team. After Kei saves her from a tight spot shortly after her arrival, she becomes quite fond of him. As a hobby, she dyes her hair, mostly in shades of green.
Viper Zero (バイパーゼロ, Baipā Zero)
An Anima with the call sign "Barbie 04". She flies a Mitsubishi F-2. She does not speak, and her actual appearance is unknown, as anyone seeing her beholds an image of the person they are currently thinking about the most; this effect occurs due to the instability of her central core, which acts as an empathic reflector. Additionally, she likes to dress up in lolita clothing.
Rhino (ライノ, Raino)
Voiced by: Ryoko Shiraishi
The only American Anima produced by Boeing Defense, Space & Security, flying a Boeing F/A-18E/F Super Hornet. Her call sign is "Sapphire 01". Her will and consciousness are taken over by the Xi when she is lured into a Xi trap along with Kei and Gripen, and she becomes the first Anima to be corrupted and destroyed. Her name is a reference to a common nickname for the Super Hornet.
Minghua Song (宋 明華, Son Minhoa)
Voiced by: Lynn
Kei's Chinese childhood friend with a forceful attitude, who lost her parents during the chaotic evacuation of Shanghai. She has formed a crush on Kei and considers herself his girlfriend, but since she has never told him about her feelings, he simply views her as an older sister.
Haruka Yashirodōri (八代通 遥, Yashirodōri Haruka)
Voiced by: Kenji Nomura
The leading JASDF scientist behind the reverse-engineering of the Xi's weaponry, and the developer of the Anima system. Because of the emotional effect Kei has on Gripen, he constantly nicknames him "Prince Charming" (王子さま, ōji-sama). Despite his gruff demeanor, he cares for his creations like a father.
William Shankle (ウィリアム・シャンケル, Wiriamu Shankeru)
Voiced by: Kenjiro Tsuda
An American scientist responsible for Rhino whose specialty is artificial intelligence; he is developing drone fighters based on Anima flight and combat data.
Funato (舟戸)
Voiced by: Keiji Hirai
A JASDF engineer working under Yashirodōri.

== Media ==
=== Light novels ===
Kōji Natsumi published the first light novel, with illustrations by Asagi Tōsaka, under ASCII Media Works' Dengeki Bunko imprint in 2014.

No.	Japanese release date	Japanese ISBN
1	September 10, 2014	978-4-04-866862-0
2	March 10, 2015	978-4-04-869187-1
3	June 10, 2015	978-4-04-865195-0
4	November 10, 2015	978-4-04-865502-6
5	March 10, 2016	978-4-04-865810-2
6	July 9, 2016	978-4-04-892188-6
7	October 8, 2016	978-4-04-892391-0
8	November 10, 2017	978-4-04-893479-4
9	June 9, 2018	978-4-04-893875-4
10	January 10, 2019	978-4-04-912324-1
11	March 9, 2019	978-4-04-912384-5
12	June 8, 2019	978-4-04-912611-2

=== Manga ===
A manga adaptation with art by Takahiro Seguchi began serialization in Kadokawa Shoten's shōnen manga magazine Monthly Shōnen Ace magazine on October 26, 2018.

No.	Japanese release date	Japanese ISBN
1	December 25, 2018	978-4-04-107818-1
2	July 26, 2019	978-4-04-107819-8

=== Anime ===
An anime television series adaptation by Satelight was announced on June 1, 2018. The series is directed by Katsumi Ono and written by Shingo Nagai, with character designs by Tōru Imanishi. I've Sound composed the series' music. The series aired from January 10 to March 28, 2019, on AT-X, before airing on Tokyo MX, BS11, Sun TV, and AbemaTV, and ran for 12 episodes. Run Girls, Run! performs the series' opening theme song, "Break the Blue!!". The ending theme song is "Colorful Wing", performed by Yuuka Morishima, Hitomi Ōwada, and Shiori Izawa. Crunchyroll simulcast the series worldwide, excluding in Asia. Discotek Media licensed the series and released it on home video in December 2021.

No.	Title	Original release date
1	"Crimson Wings"; Transliteration: "Akai Tsubasa" (Japanese: 紅い翼)	January 10, 2019
Kei Narutani and his childhood friend Minghua Song are Chinese refugees fleeing to Japan to escape an unknown and highly advanced alien force called the Xi. Several Xi aircraft arrive and attack the ship Kei and Minghua are aboard, but they are saved by the intervention of a highly advanced plane resembling a JAS 39E/F Gripen. The Gripen crashes into the water after the Xi retreat, and Kei swims over to rescue the pilot, who is a mysterious girl that kisses him upon seeing him. The Japan Air Self Defense Force recovers the Gripen, and Kei and Minghua reach Japan safely where they live at Kei's grandfather's house. Intrigued by the Gripen, as well as wanting revenge against the Xi for killing his mother, Kei heads to a nearby JASDF base to see if the Gripen is being stored there. Minghua follows him, and they are both captured by base security. Inside, Kei meets Haruka Yashirodōri, who reveals to him that the JASDF has developed advanced fighters called "Daughters" piloted by special entities called "Anima", which are capable of overcoming the Xi's technological advantage. He further reveals that for some reason, Gripen seems to respond positively to Kei's presence, and he offers Kei a chance to join his team and help fight the Xi.
2	"Komatsu Rendezvous"; Transliteration: "Komatsu Randebū" (Japanese: コマツ・ランデブー)	January 17, 2019
Upon Yashirodōri's invitation, Kei returns to Komatsu Air Base the next morning to start working with Gripen. Gripen fetches him from their meeting point and begins showing him around, thereby revealing a surprisingly dreamy human-like but very scatterbrained side. Kei also notices a strong antipathy by JASDF staff towards the Anima. The next day, Gripen seeks Kei out at his home for a date, during which she reveals that she suffers from an unknown defect, which leaves her without a clear purpose of existence and frequent breakdowns during her missions. They spend the rest of the day with leisure activities until Gripen inexplicably collapses and is immediately picked up by Yashirodōri's staff. Yashirodōri tells Kei that Gripen usually breaks down (i.e. loses consciousness) after just three hours, but her activity cycle was substantially extended on this day, and he expresses hope that Kei's presence will affect her positively during her test flight in a week's time; otherwise, she will be declared a write-off prototype and scrapped.
3	"Anima Core"; Transliteration: "Anima no Honshitsu" (Japanese: アニマの本質)	January 24, 2019
When Gripen performs substandardly during a test simulation, Kei is allowed to take the controls of a Daughter for the first time. As the critical test flight approaches, Yashirodōri finds out that Gripen's brainwaves have synchronized with Kei's upon their first meeting, and that her inner stability depends greatly on his close proximity to her. But during an encounter with antipathic JASDF members, Kei learns that Anima are created using salvaged Xi technology, which incites an emotional conflict in him. At the day of the test flight, however, he receives a message from Gripen explaining that she knows of her Xi origin but has chosen to fight for humanity's sake. Deciding that he cannot abandon her, Kei races to Komatsu to attend her test flight, but Gripen suffers another breakdown and a Xi fighter unexpectedly moves in to attack. But before Gripen is shot down, another Anima—Eagle—intervenes and takes out the enemy.
4	"The World You See"; Transliteration: "Kimi no Miru Sekai" (Japanese: 君の見る世界)	January 31, 2019
Soon after Eagle arrives at Komatsu, she barges in on a date between Kei and Minghua (much to the latter's chagrin). After he learns from her that Gripen is going to be scrapped on this very day, he frantically rushes back to the air base and finds her next to an old plane, assuring her that he cares for her. Just before he can spirit her away from her impending fate, a massive Xi attack force approaches Japan, and with Eagle outnumbered on her own, defeat seems assured. Despite Yashirodōri's willingness to allow Gripen and Kei to defect, Gripen and Kei decide to go up together. Gripen's initial failure to interface with her fighter forces Kei to take the controls, and after he manages to shoot down a Xi fighter, Gripen's confidence is boosted, allowing her to enter the fight by herself and defeat the hostile force alongside Eagle.
5	"Independent Mixed Test Unit"; Transliteration: "Dokuritsu Konsei Hikō Jikken-tai" (Japanese: 独立混成飛行実験隊)	February 7, 2019
Kei begins combat training as Gripen's co-pilot, but her performance still leaves something to be desired because she is now too concerned about Kei's health during high-G maneuvers. As Kei leaves for home in the evening, he encounters another Anima, Phantom, who has just newly arrived at Komatsu. The next day, Yashirodōri announces that the Anima have been reorganized into an Independent Mixed Test Unit (IMTU)—a combined fighting team for greater effectiveness against further Xi incursions—but any ideas towards an esprit de corps are hindered by inherent rivalistic tensions between the three girls, so Yashirodōri schedules an immediate training flight for them. However, Phantom uses her special cybernetic interface ability to cheat during the dogfight, which sparks animosity with the rest of the team.
6	"Raison d'Etre"; Transliteration: "Rezon Dētoru" (Japanese: 存在意義(レゾンデートル))	February 14, 2019
As Kei discusses his mounting discontent with Phantom's disdainful, self-opinionated attitude with Yashiodōri and Gripen, he learns more about the uniqueness of each Anima's personality. Soon afterwards, an emergency arises as the Xi begin establishing a forward operating base on an island right on the edge of Japan's ADIZ. The Anima are sent out to destroy the base, with Phantom assigned to guide a missile barrage while Gripen and Eagle provide cover. However, Phantom, thinking herself too valuable to die, hangs back from the action, which leads to Gripen and Eagle being overwhelmed by the base's defenses and forced into retreating. After their return, Kei begins taunting Phantom with a challenge to a match between her and Gripen: if she loses, she will finally subordinate herself; and if she wins, Kei will become her partner instead of Gripen's.
7	"After the Bewilderment"; Transliteration: "Madoi no Saki" (Japanese: 惑いの先)	February 21, 2019
Even though he is chagrined with the infighting, Yashirodōri gives Kei permission to go through with his plan, knowing that time is of the essence. Using simulators at Naha Air Base, Kei and Gripen engage in mock combat with Phantom, but she attempts to cheat again. Despite this, Kei outwits Phantom and shoots her down, revealing afterwards that he had expected her to cheat and developed a counter-tactic. Admitting defeat, Phantom sets the condition that during the next day's repeat to destroy the Xi base, Kei must fly while Gripen is to handle the plane's weapon systems, as she knows that Gripen cannot handle the stress of combat piloting. The next morning, the attack is renewed, but Eagle is sent off to support an allied strike force, leaving Kei, Gripen, and Phantom on their own.
8	"An Unhappy Top Secret"; Transliteration: "Fukigenna Saikō Kimitsu" (Japanese: 不機嫌な最高機密)	February 28, 2019
Despite the Xi's formidable defenses, Kei, Gripen, and Phantom manage to complete their mission with the unexpected assistance of another Anima, Viper Zero. Shortly thereafter, Kei encounters a girl who bears an uncanny resemblance to Minghua, leading to some confusion in their relationship. As Yashirodōri later informs him, the mystery girl is Viper Zero, whose defective EGG makes her assume the illusionary appearance of any specific person in the eyes of any who see her. But while Kei desperately attempts to mend his relationship with Minghua, yet another Anima—with her own supervisor—makes her appearance.
9	"Unphysical Layer"; Transliteration: "Anfijikaru Reiyā" (Japanese: アンフィジカルレイヤー)	March 7, 2019
Kei experiences a dream where his interfacing with Gripen's memories appears to unlock an important secret about the reason for Gripen and the Xi's existence. Soon after, he is taken to Atsugi Air Base, where he, Gripen, and Yashirodōri meet American scientist William Shankle and the USA's sole Anima, Rhino, who pilots an F/A-18E Super Hornet. They learn of an impending mission to retake the continent by using both Anima and specially designed drone fighters. Shankle invites Kei and Gripen to play a simulation to either defeat the Xi or ensure humanity's survival for 10 years. After Kei fails several times, Gripen wins the scenario by ensuring humanity's survival in an unexpected way. After the simulation, Yashirodōri explains to Kei that Shankle views Anima as mere computers, when in fact they are thinking beings whose loyalty and friendship must be won for humanity to succeed.
10	"The Mission to Retake Shanghai"; Transliteration: "Shanhai Dakkan Sakusen" (Japanese: 上海奪還作戦)	March 14, 2019
An invasion of Shanghai, which entails a massive missile barrage and air superiority action, is being planned as the first step of beating back the Xi. As Kei tries to sort out his feelings, he is nearly run over by a truck due to Phantom's actions. Phantom does not want him to take part in the attack lest he gets hurt, as she surmises that the assault will only serve to sacrifice the Japanese Anima in order to both provide live combat data for the new drone fighters and preserve American military supremacy. Soon, the IMTU relocates on board of the USS Gerald R. Ford for the operation. Just before they embark on the perilous mission, Gripen assures Kei that she will stand beside him until the very end.
11	"A Homeland With No One Home"; Transliteration: "Dare mo Inai Kokyō" (Japanese: 誰もいない故郷)	March 21, 2019
The mission begins with a carrier launch of Gripen and the other Anima. The US sends a large conventional fighter force to split up the Xi groups, after which they are followed by the drones, who show surprising effectiveness and take out a large group of the Xi fighters. The Anima finish the breakthrough to head towards Shanghai, only to be betrayed by a large EPCM burst that turns the drones against the Anima. Gripen is saved by Rhino, the two of them sustaining heavy damage and running low on fuel. Without options, they continue on to Shanghai Pudong International Airport, which is covered in a white fog similar to in Kei's dreams. After an unsuccessful search for fuel, Kei, Gripen, and Rhino retire to a hotel room, noting that while empty of people, the terminal is still running on full electricity with food and toiletries available. Kei hears a crackling sound that raises his suspicions. Rhino agrees to keep first watch, but ends up keeping watch the entire time and disappears in the morning, leaving a note about going to find fuel. Kei hears the crackling sound again and tries to find it. He opens the door, only to find Rhino in the hallway with her hood up.
12	"The Sky I Fly With You"; Transliteration: "Kimi to Tobu Sora" (Japanese: 君と飛ぶ空)	March 28, 2019
Rhino greets Kei cheerfully, explaining that she has found fuel. The crackling sounds, having become more intense, are revealed to come from blue crystals growing throughout the airport. After refuelling the planes, a suspicious Kei asks Rhino how she was able to find fuel when there was none available yesterday. She reveals herself to have been hijacked by the Xi and shoots at Kei, wounding his face and leg. As Kei runs to rescue a sleeping Gripen, the entire airport becomes consumed by blue crystals. Kei manages to awaken Gripen from a dream about peace and the order of the Xi. Kei and Gripen take off, still being chased by Rhino. Rhino nearly manages to turn Gripen to the Xi, but Kei uses their relationship to snap her out of it. The two planes engage in a dog fight, which Gripen and Kei win by dropping a missile behind them and using the distraction to shoot Rhino down. Now chased by many Xi fighters, the two are rescued by Eagle, Phantom, and Viper Zero, who dispatch the Xi. Kei then blacks out, awakening in a hospital. Yashirodōri reveals that the Americans had placed many restrictions on Rhino's behaviour, causing her to lose control of herself when the Xi dissolved those restrictions; it was only Gripen's bond with Kei that prevented the same fate from befalling her. Afterwards, Kei tells Gripen he would love to fly with her over China one day.

== Reception ==
=== Previews ===
Anime News Network had four editors review the first episode of the anime: Paul Jensen was ambivalent towards the premiere, criticizing the "opening action scene" for being "long on spectacle and short on research" but praised the script for its "mostly-competent character writing" and "interesting bits and pieces" to its overall premise. Theron Martin called it "a new entry in a packed genre, but the first episode offers just enough unique hooks and production value that the series might have a chance to distinguish itself." Nick Creamer felt the premiere had a "pretty middle-of-the-road production" with its inconsistent character animation and indistinguishable character designs, but praised the script for putting thought into its "worldbuilding and characterization" to flesh out a "coherent and sympathetic" story, saying "while this show seems to be setting up a narrative template you've likely seen before, that narrative is executed with enough thoughtfulness that I'm happy to give this one a recommendation." The fourth reviewer, Rebecca Silverman, wrote: "I couldn't guess yet how typical of the genre it will be, but if that's a genre you enjoy, it may be worth giving this a second episode to see how it irons out its other issues and gets the rest of the plot going."

=== Series ===
Stig Høgset, writing for THEM Anime Reviews, commended the series for its "oddly realistic approach to the topic of maturity", its bland cast being used relatively well and withholding "definite answers" to questions the viewers can ponder on, but was critical of the animation slipping during the dull slice-of-life moments, a "nonsensical last arc" coming across as "too fillerish" and an inconclusive ending to the overall plot, concluding that: "It's OK. It's got some good parts and some bad parts, and it will probably entertain you if or when it's not making you bored."
