= Nanami Atsugi =

Japanese voice actress (born 1997)

- 厚木 那奈美
- Born: 11 October 1997 (age 28); Nagano Prefecture, Japan
- Other name: Acchan
- Occupation: Voice actress
- Years active: 2017–present
- Agent: 81 Produce
- Notable work: Wake Up, Girls! New Chapter! as Itsuka Atsugi; Kiratto Pri Chan as Rinka Aoba

Nanami Atsugi (厚木 那奈美, Atsugi Nanami; born 11 October 1997) is a Japanese voice actress associated with 81 Produce and Avex Pictures. She is best known for voicing Itsuka Atsugi in Wake Up, Girls! New Chapter! and Rinka Aoba in Kiratto Pri Chan.

== Biography ==
=== 1997–2017: Early life and prior to career start ===
Nanami Atsugi was born on 11 October 1997 in Nagano Prefecture. As a child, she admired Petit Charat, a major character in Di Gi Charat, and during elementary school, she learned there was a voice actor playing Pichiko, and thought that if she became a voice actor she could become Petit Charat. Afterwards, when she looked at Iris, the band best known for the PriPara anime, she came to think "I want to be a singing and dancing voice actor".

After graduating from high school, she considered going to a voice acting school, but consulted with her parents before going to college. She gave up midway in the seiyu path, but as a college freshman, she checked out an audition that was taking place because she had leisure time during her winter break. She learned that it was the avex×81produce Wake Up, Girls! AUDITION 3rd Anison Vocal Audition and, having liked both Iris and Wake Up, Girls!, was inspired by the words "Your Dream Awakens" in the audition advertisement. She participated in the final audition.

=== 2017–present: Wake Up! Girls and Kiratto Pri Chan ===
Atsugi was one of three people who passed the audition in 2017 out of 2,000 applicants, along with Coco Hayashi and Yuuka Morishima, and they formed the three-person unit Run Girls, Run!. Her first impression from the other two members of Run Girls! Run was "Nogizaka46 came", which was thought to be graceful and young, though Atsugi denied that this was the case. However, the members said that it is better to recommend the place where the atmosphere is a young lady.

Her voice acting debut was in the Wake Up, Girls! spinoff New Chapter, starring as Itsuka Atsuki. After her debut, she was performing as a voice actress in tandem with the university. In 2018, she starred as Rinka Aoba in Kiratto Pri Chan, which she definitely wanted to be involved in as a voice actor. All three members of Run Girls, Run! were involved as voice actors and theme song singers.

== Personal life ==
She had spent more than ten years in classic ballet classes since she was three years old. She quit ballet due to a foot injury, but continues to dance in other genres, mimicking dances from Wake Up, Girls! and The Melancholy of Haruhi Suzumiya. Before her debut, she also posted a video called Odottemita (踊ってみた; lit. I tried dancing). The only thing that she excels in is dancing, and she choreographed her choreography to make her dance appeal at auditions.

Voice actress Mayu Mineda was her classmate in junior high school, and the two have co-starred in the radio show Maji! Anilive. Mineda was a classmate of Atsugi for three years,、and they danced together as dance companions.

== Filmography ==
=== Anime ===
2017

- Wake Up, Girls! New Chapter!, Itsuka Atsuki

2018

- Cardfight!! Vanguard, Promise Daughter
- Death March to the Parallel World Rhapsody, Martha
- Kiratto Pri Chan, Rinka Aoba
- Pastel Life, Mob girl 2
- Tsukuru no Daisuki! Nendo! Kun to Nakamatachi!, Lunlun

=== Film ===
2018

- PriPara & Kiratto Pri☆Chan Movie: Sparkling Memorial Live, Rinka Aoba
- I Want to Eat Your Pancreas the Film, guidance voice, friends, and customer
