= List of How Not to Summon a Demon Lord volumes =

How Not to Summon a Demon Lord is a Japanese light novel series written by Yukiya Murasaki, illustrated by Takahiro Tsurusaki, and published by Kodansha under their Ranobe Bunko imprint since December 2014. J-Novel Club licensed the novels. While the manga adaptation of the series is written by Naoto Fukuda. It launched on Kodansha's Niconico manga service Suiyōbi no Sirius in June 2015. The manga is licensed by Seven Seas Entertainment.

== Light novels ==
No.	Original release date	Original ISBN	English release date	English ISBN
1	December 2, 2014	978-4-06-381433-0	December 4, 2017 (digital); February 5, 2019 (print)	978-1-71-831700-0 (digital); 978-1-71-835200-1 (print)
"Prologue" (プロローグ, Purorōgu); 1. "Being Summoned" (召喚されてみれば, Shōkan sa Rete Mireba); 2. "Trying to be an Adventurer" (冒険者をやってみる, Bōken-sha o Yatte Miru); 3. "Trying to Save the World" (世界を救ってみる, Sekai o Sukutte Miru); "Epilogue" (エピローグ, Epirōgu)
2	May 1, 2015	978-4-06-381461-3	February 19, 2018 (digital); February 5, 2019 (print)	978-1-71-831702-4 (digital); 978-1-71-835201-8 (print)
"Prologue" (プロローグ, Purorōgu); 1. "Meeting with the Governor" (領主と会ってみる, Ryōshu to Atte Miru); "Interlude" (幕間, Makuai); 2. "Trying to Avoid a War" (戦争を回避してみる, Sensō o Kaihi Shite Miru); "Interlude" (幕間, Makuai); 3. "Going to War" (戦争してみる, Sensō Shite Miru); "Epilogue" (エピローグ, Epirōgu)
3	September 2, 2015	978-4-06-381487-3	May 7, 2018 (digital); April 2, 2019 (print)	978-1-71-831704-8 (digital); 978-1-71-835202-5 (print)
"Prologue" (プロローグ, Purorōgu); "Interlude" (幕間, Makuai); 1. "Speaking with the Fallen" (魔族と話してみる, Mazoku to Hanashite Miru); 2. "Releasing the Seal" (封印を解いてみる, Fūin o Hodoite Miru); 3. "Going to a Café" (珈琲店に行ってみる, Kōhī-ten ni Itte Miru); 4. "Rem's Story" (レムの話, Remu no Hanashi); "Interlude" (幕間, Makuai); 5. "The Two Demon Lords" (魔王と魔王, Maō to Maō); "Epilogue" (エピローグ, Epirōgu)
4	February 2, 2016	978-4-06-381513-9	July 23, 2018 (digital); June 4, 2019 (print)	978-1-71-831706-2 (digital); 978-1-71-835203-2 (print)
"Prologue"; 1. "Pest Control"; "Interlude"; 2. "Flying Sky High"; 3. "Heading to a New Town"; "Interlude"; 4. "In Hot Pursuit"; "Epilogue"
5	June 2, 2016	978-4-06-381541-2	October 8, 2018 (digital); August 6, 2019 (print)	978-1-71-831708-6 (digital); 978-1-71-835204-9 (print)
"Prologue"; 1. "Going to a Dungeon"; 2. "Clearing a Dungeon"; "Interlude 1"; 3. "Clearing a Dungeon, Part Two"; 4. "Saving One's Companions"; 5. "Changing Equipment"; "Interlude 2"; 6. "Using a New Weapon"; "Epilogue"
6	September 30, 2016	978-4-06-381557-3	December 12, 2018 (digital); October 1, 2019 (print)	978-1-71-831710-9 (digital); 978-1-71-835205-6 (print)
"Prologue"; 1. "The Royal Capital"; 2. "The Cathedral"; 3. "Horn's Battle"; 4. "The Demon Lord Awakens"; "Interlude"; "Epilogue"
7	March 2, 2017	978-4-06-381589-4	February 26, 2019 (digital); December 3, 2019 (print)	978-1-71-831712-3 (digital); 978-1-71-835206-3 (print)
"Prologue"; 1. "Sylvie, Once More"; "Interlude"; 2. "Going to the Dark Elves' Forest"; 3. "Meeting the Chief"; 4. "Visiting One's Homeland"; 5. "The Elves' Sacred Treasure"; "Interlude"; 6. "Holding a Wedding"; "Epilogue"
8	August 2, 2017	978-4-06-381619-8	April 29, 2019 (digital); February 4, 2020 (print)	978-1-71-831714-7 (digital); 978-1-71-835207-0 (print)
"Prologue"; 1. "Experiencing the First Night"; 2. "Charging into a Mansion"; "Interlude"; 3. "Meeting the Swordmaster"; 4. "Leveling Up"; 5. "Facing a Trial"; "Interlude"; "Epilogue"
9	February 2, 2018	978-4-06-381643-3	June 15, 2019 (digital); April 7, 2020 (print)	978-1-71-831716-1 (digital); 978-1-71-835208-7 (print)
"Prologue"; 1. "Invasion of the Demon Overlord's Army"; 2. "Fighting the Demon Overlord"; 3. "How Not to Go to a Feast"; 4. "The Lonesome One"; 5. "Going All Out"; "Epilogue"
10	June 29, 2018	978-4-06-512645-5	September 8, 2019 (digital); June 2, 2020 (print)	978-1-71-831718-5 (digital); 978-1-71-835209-4 (print)
"Prologue"; 1. "Being Summoned to the Capital"; 2. "Conquering the Viridian Cathedral"; 3. "Going to the Capital (Again)"; "Interlude"; 4. "Detective Horn?"; "Interlude"; 5. "Stopping a Ritual"; "Epilogue"
11	October 2, 2018	978-4-06-513796-3	December 2, 2019 (digital); August 4, 2020 (print)	978-1-71-831720-8 (digital); 978-1-71-835210-0 (print)
"Prologue"; 1. "Visiting the Royal Castle"; 2. "Heading to the Southern Frontier"; 3. "Going to Caliture"; 4. "Ending a War"; "Final Chapter: Speaking to Rem"
12	May 2, 2019	978-4-06-515618-6; 978-4-06-516122-7 (LE)	January 26, 2020 (digital); October 6, 2020 (print)	978-1-71-831722-2 (digital); 978-1-71-835211-7 (print)
"Prologue"; 1. "Trying to Practice"; "Interlude"; 2. "Trying to Be a Paladin Captain"; 3. "Returning to the Capital"; "Interlude"; 4. "The Capital Ablaze"; 5. "Fighting Seriously for Once"; "Epilogue"
13	June 2, 2020	978-4-06-519445-4	December 1, 2020 (digital); July 20, 2021 (print)	978-1-71-831724-6 (digital); 978-1-71-835212-4 (print)
1. "Erina Reufelia"; "Interlude"; 2. "Becoming Determined"; 3. "Invading the Castle"; 4. "Magimatic Castle Viovix"; 5. "Trying to Convince People"; 6. "Getting Licked All Over"
14	June 2, 2021	978-4-06-523735-9	October 12, 2021 (digital); May 24, 2022 (print)	978-1-71-831726-0 (digital); 978-1-71-835213-1 (print)
"Prologue"; 1. "Infiltrating the Imperial Castle"; 2. "Coming Face to Face with It"; 3. "Fighting the Emperor"; "Interlude"; 4. "Fighting a Godslayer"; 5. "Being Summoned to Another World"

== Manga ==
No.	Original release date	Original ISBN	English release date	English ISBN
1	February 2, 2016	978-4-06-376596-0	June 26, 2018	978-1-626927-60-5
1. "Being Summoned I" (召喚されてみれば I, Shōkan sa Rete Mireba I); 2. "Being Summoned II" (召喚されてみれば II, Shōkan sa Rete Mireba II); 3. "Being Summoned III" (召喚されてみれば III, Shōkan sa Rete Mireba III); 4. "Being Summoned IV" (召喚されてみれば IV, Shōkan sa Rete Mireba IV)
2	June 2, 2016	978-4-06-390637-0	September 25, 2018	978-1-626928-65-7
5. "Trying to Be an Adventurer I" (冒険者をやってみる I, Bōken-sha o Yatte Miru I); 6. "Trying to Be an Adventurer II" (冒険者をやってみる II, Bōken-sha o Yatte Miru II); 7. "Trying to Be an Adventurer III" (冒険者をやってみる III, Bōken-sha o Yatte Miru III); 8. "Trying to Be an Adventurer IV" (冒険者をやってみる IV, Bōken-sha o Yatte Miru IV); 9. "Trying to Save the World I" (世界を救ってみる I, Sekai o Sukutte Miru I)
3	September 30, 2016	978-4-06-390657-8	February 26, 2019	978-1-626929-65-4
10. "Trying to Save the World II" (世界を救ってみる II, Sekai o Sukutte Miru II); 11. "Trying to Save the World III" (世界を救ってみる III, Sekai o Sukutte Miru III); 12. "Trying to Save the World IV" (世界を救ってみる IV, Sekai o Sukutte Miru IV); 13. "Meeting with the Governor I" (領主と会ってみる I, Ryōshu to Atte Miru I); 14. "Meeting with the Governor II" (領主と会ってみる II, Ryōshu to Atte Miru II)
4	March 9, 2017	978-4-06-390687-5	May 14, 2019	978-1-64275-078-2
15. "Interlude" (幕間, Makuai); 16. "Trying to Avoid a War I" (戦争を回避してみる I, Sensō o Kaihi Shite Miru I); 17. "Trying to Avoid a War II" (戦争を回避してみる II, Sensō o Kaihi Shite Miru II); 18. "Going to War I" (戦争をしてみる I, Sensō o Shite Miru I); 19. "Going to War II" (戦争をしてみる II, Sensō o Shite Miru II)
5	August 9, 2017	978-4-06-390723-0	September 24, 2019	978-1-64275-339-4
20. "Going to War III" (戦争してみる III, Sensō Shite Miru III); 21. "Interlude I" (幕間 I, Makuai I); 22. "Interlude II" (幕間 II, Makuai II); 23. "Speaking with the Fallen I" (魔族と話してみる I, Mazoku to Hanashite Miru I); 24. "Speaking with the Fallen II" (魔族と話してみる II, Mazoku to Hanashite Miru II)
6	February 2, 2018	978-4-06-510795-9; ISBN 978-4-06-510419-4 (LE)	November 19, 2019	978-1-64275-340-0
25. "Speaking with the Fallen III" (魔族と話してみる III, Mazoku to Hanashite Miru III); 26. "Releasing the Seal I" (封印を解いてみる I, Fūin o Hodoite Miru I); 27. "Releasing the Seal II" (封印を解いてみる II, Fūin o Hodoite Miru II); 28. "Releasing the Seal III" (封印を解いてみる III, Fūin o Hodoite Miru III); 29. "Releasing the Seal IV" (封印を解いてみる IV, Fūin o Hodoite Miru IV)
7	July 9, 2018	978-4-06-511981-5; ISBN 978-4-06-512845-9 (LE)	April 28, 2020	978-1-64505-220-3
30. "Going to a Café I" (珈琲店に行ってみる I, Kōhī-ten ni itte miru I); 31. "Going to a Café II" (珈琲店に行ってみる II, Kōhī-ten ni itte miru II); 32. "Rem's Story I" (レムの話 I, Remu no Hanashi I); 33. "Rem's Story II" (レムの話 II, Remu no Hanashi II); 34. "Rem's Story III" (レムの話 III, Remu no Hanashi III)
8	December 6, 2018	978-4-06-514075-8	August 4, 2020	978-1-64505-518-1
35. "The Two Demon Lords I" (魔王と魔王 I, Maō to Maō I); 36. "The Two Demon Lords II" (魔王と魔王 II, Maō to Maō II); 37. "The Two Demon Lords III" (魔王と魔王 III, Maō to Maō III); 38. "The Two Demon Lords IV" (魔王と魔王 IV, Maō to Maō IV); 39. "Interlude I" (幕間 I, Makuai I)
9	May 9, 2019	978-4-06-515400-7	October 13, 2020	978-1-64505-758-1
40. "Interlude II" (幕間 II, Makuai II); 41. "Trying to Fly I" (空を飛んでみる I, Sora o Tonde Miru I); 42. "Trying to Fly II" (空を飛んでみる II, Sora o Tonde Miru II); 43. "Trying to Fly III" (空を飛んでみる III, Sora o Tonde Miru III); 44. "Going to a New City I" (新しい街へ行ってみる I, Atarashii machi e itte miru I)
10	October 9, 2019	978-4-06-517217-9	January 26, 2021	978-1-64505-808-3
45. "Going to a New City II" (新しい街へ行ってみる II, Atarashii machi e itte miru II); 46. "Going to a New City III" (新しい街へ行ってみる III, Atarashii machi e itte miru III); 47. "Going to a New City IV" (新しい街へ行ってみる IV, Atarashii machi e itte miru IV); 48. "Catching Up I" (追いかけてみる I, Oikakete miru I); 49. "Catching Up II" (追いかけてみる II, Oikakete miru II)
11	April 9, 2020	978-4-06-519084-5	April 27, 2021	978-1-64827-103-8
50. "Catching Up III" (追いかけてみる III, Oikakete miru III); 51. "Catching Up IV" (追いかけてみる IV, Oikakete miru IV); 52. "Reaching a Dungeon" (ダンジョンに行ってみる I, Danjon ni itte miru I); 53. "Raiding a Dungeon I" (ダンジョンを攻略してみる I, Danjon o kōryaku shite miru I); 54. "Raiding a Dungeon II" (ダンジョンを攻略してみる II, Danjon o kōryaku shite miru II)
12	October 9, 2020	978-4-06-520904-2	October 5, 2021	978-1-64827-289-9
55. "Saving a Companion I" (仲間を助けてみる １, Nakama o tasukete miru 1); 56. "Saving a Companion II" (仲間を助けてみる ２, Nakama o tasukete miru 2); 57. "Saving a Companion III" (仲間を助けてみる ３, Nakama o tasukete miru 3); 58. "Trying Out New Equipment I" (装備を新しくしてみる １, Sōbi o atarashiku shite miru 1); 59. "Trying Out New Equipment II" (装備を新しくしてみる ２, Sōbi o atarashiku shite miru 2)
13	March 9, 2021	978-4-06-522506-6	January 4, 2022	978-1-64827-385-8
60. "Trying to Use a Weapon I" (武器を使ってみる １, Buki o tsukatte miru 1); 61. "Trying to Use a Weapon II" (武器を使ってみる ２, Buki o tsukatte miru 2); 62. "Interlude" (幕間, Makuai); 63. "The Royal Capital I" (王都 １, Ōto 1); 64. "The Royal Capital II" (王都 ２, Ōto 2)
14	June 9, 2021	978-4-06-523593-5	June 14, 2022	978-1-63858-305-9
65. "The Royal Capital III" (王都 ３, Ōto 3); 66. "The Great Cathedral I" (大教会堂 １, Dai Kyōkaidō 1); 67. "The Great Cathedral II" (大教会堂 ２, Dai Kyōkaidō 2); 68. "Horn's Battle" (ホルンの戦い, Horun no Tatakai); 69. "Demon Lord Resurrection I" (魔王復活 １, Maō Fukkatsu 1)
15	September 9, 2021	978-4-06-524775-4	January 3, 2023	978-1-63858-892-4
70. "Demon Lord Resurrection II" (魔王復活 ２, Maō Fukkatsu 2); 71. "Interlude I" (幕間 １, Makuai 1); 72. "Interlude II" (幕間 ２, Makuai 2); 73. "Sylvie, Once Again" (シルヴィ再び, Shiruvi Futatabi); 74. "Trying to Visit the Dark Elf Forest I" (ダークエルフの森へ行ってみる １, Dāku Erufu no Mori e Itte Miru 1)
16	January 7, 2022	978-4-06-526564-2	August 15, 2023	978-1-68579-516-0
75. "Trying to Visit the Dark Elf Forest II" (ダークエルフの森へ行ってみる ２, Dāku Erufu no Mori e Itte Miru 2); 76. "Trying to Visit the Dark Elf Forest III" (ダークエルフの森へ行ってみる ３, Dāku Erufu no Mori e Itte Miru 3); 77. "Trying to Visit the Dark Elf Forest IV" (ダークエルフの森へ行ってみる ４, Dāku Erufu no Mori e Itte Miru 4); 78. "Trying to Return to the Village I" (里帰りしてみる １, Satogaeri Shite Miru 1); 79. "Trying to Return to the Village II" (里帰りしてみる ２, Satogaeri Shite Miru 2)
17	April 7, 2022	978-4-06-527390-6	November 28, 2023	978-1-68579-953-3
80. "Hidden Tresure of the Elves" (エルフの秘宝, Erufu no Hihō); 81. "Hidden Tresure of the Elves II" (エルフの秘宝 2, Erufu no Hihō 2); 82. "Trying to Hold a Wedding Ceremony I" (結婚式を挙げてみる 1, Kekkonshiki o Agete Miru 1); 83. "Trying to Hold a Wedding Ceremony II" (結婚式を挙げてみる 2, Kekkonshiki o Agete Miru 2); 84. "Trying to Hold a Wedding Ceremony III" (結婚式を挙げてみる 3, Kekkonshiki o Agete Miru 3)
18	July 7, 2022	978-4-06-528254-0	April 16, 2024	979-8-88843-355-3
85. "Trying to Hold a Wedding Ceremony IV" (結婚式を挙げてみる 4, Kekkonshiki o Agete Miru 4); 86. "Trying to Hold a Wedding Night" (初夜をヤってみる, Shoya o Yatte Miru); 87. "Trying to March into a Gang Residence I" (一家の屋敷に乗りこんでみる 1, Ikka no Yashiki ni Norikonde Miru 1); 88. "Trying to March into a Gang Residence II" (一家の屋敷に乗りこんでみる 2, Ikka no Yashiki ni Norikonde Miru 2); 89. "Trying to Met a Swordmaster I" (剣聖に会ってみる 1, Kensei ni Atte Miru 1)
19	November 9, 2022	978-4-06-529673-8	August 20, 2024	979-8-88843-851-0
90. "Trying to Met a Swordmaster II" (剣聖に会ってみる 2, Kensei ni Atte Miru 2); 91. "Trying to Met a Swordmaster III" (剣聖に会ってみる 3, Kensei ni Atte Miru 3); 92. "Trying to Take on a Trial I" (試練に挑んでみる 1, Shiren ni Idonde Miru 1); 93. "Trying to Take on a Trial II" (試練に挑んでみる 2, Shiren ni Idonde Miru 2)
20	March 9, 2023	978-4-06-531500-2	December 17, 2024	979-8-88843-983-8
94. "Trying to Take on a Trial III" (試練に挑んでみる 3, Shiren ni Idonde Miru 3); 95. "Interlude" (幕間, Makuai); 96. "Invasion of the Demon Lord's Amry I" (魔王軍、襲来 1, Maō-gun, Shūrai 1); 97. "Invasion of the Demon Lord's Amry II" (魔王軍、襲来 2, Maō-gun, Shūrai 2)
21	August 8, 2023	978-4-06-532717-3	April 8, 2025	979-8-89160-528-2
98. "Invasion of the Demon Lord's Amry III" (魔王軍、襲来 3, Maō-gun, Shūrai 3); 99. "Trying to Fight the Demon Overlord I" (大魔王と戦ってみる 1, Dai maō to tatakatte miru 1); 100. "Trying to Fight the Demon Overlord II" (大魔王と戦ってみる 2, Dai maō to tatakatte miru 2); 101. "Trying to Fight the Demon Overlord III" (大魔王と戦ってみる 3, Dai maō to tatakatte miru 3)
22	December 7, 2023	978-4-06-533824-7	August 5, 2025	979-8-89373-352-5
102. "Interlude I" (幕間 1, Makuai 1); 103. "Interlude II" (幕間 2, Makuai 2); 104. "The Lonesome One I" (孤独なる者 1, Kodokunaru Mono 1); 105. "The Lonesome One II" (孤独なる者 2, Kodokunaru Mono 2)
23	April 9, 2024	978-4-06-535211-3	December 9, 2025	979-8-89373-353-2
106. "Trying to Go All Out I" (全力を出してみる 1, Zenryoku o Dashite Miru 1); 107. "Trying to Go All Out II" (全力を出してみる 2, Zenryoku o Dashite Miru 2); 108. "Trying to Be Summoned to the Capital I" (王都に呼ばれてみる 1, Ōto ni Yoba Rete Miru 1); 109. "Trying to Be Summoned to the Capital II" (王都に呼ばれてみる 2, Ōto ni Yoba Rete Miru 2)
24	August 7, 2024	978-4-06-536442-0	April 7, 2026	979-8-89373-812-4
110. "Trying to Take on the Viridian Cathedral I" (深緑の大聖堂を攻略してみる 1, Fukamidori no Taiseidō o Kōryaku Shite Miru 1); 111. "Trying to Take on the Viridian Cathedral II" (深緑の大聖堂を攻略してみる 2, Fukamidori no Taiseidō o Kōryaku Shite Miru 2); 112. "Trying to Go to the Capital (Again) I" (王都に行ってみる（再） 1, Ōto ni Itte Miru (sai) 1); 113. "Trying to Go to the Capital (Again) II" (王都に行ってみる（再） 2, Ōto ni Itte Miru (sai) 2)
25	December 9, 2024	978-4-06-537710-9	October 20, 2026	979-8-89561-760-1
114. Mei Tantei Horun? 1 (名探偵ホルン？ 1); 115. Mei Tantei Horun? 2 (名探偵ホルン？ 2); 116. Gishiki o Soshi Shite Miru 1 (儀式を阻止してみる 1); 117. Gishiki o Soshi Shite Miru 2 (儀式を阻止してみる 2)
26	April 9, 2025	978-4-06-539074-0	February 9, 2027	979-8-89765-209-9
118. Gishiki o Soshi Shite Miru 3 (儀式を阻止してみる 3); 119. Ōjō ni itte Miru 1 (王城に行ってみる 1); 120. Nanpō Shinchi e itte Miru 1 (南方新地へ行ってみる 1); 121. Nanpō Shinchi e itte Miru 2 (南方新地へ行ってみる 2); 1. Anjuren to Horun (アンジュレンとホルン)
27	August 7, 2025	978-4-06-540291-7	—	—
122. Karyutia Ichi e itte Miru 1 (カリュティア市へ行ってみる 1); 123. Karyutia Ichi e itte Miru 2 (カリュティア市へ行ってみる 2); 124. Karyutia Ichi e itte Miru 3 (カリュティア市へ行ってみる 3); 125. Sensō o Owara sete Miru 1 (戦争を終わらせてみる 1)
28	December 9, 2025	978-4-06-541785-0	—	—
126. Sensō o Owara sete Miru 2 (戦争を終わらせてみる 2); 127. Sensō o Owara sete Miru 3 (戦争を終わらせてみる 3); 128. Remu to Hanashite Miru 1 (レムと話してみる 1); 129. San'nin no Kadode (三人の門出)
29	April 9, 2026	978-4-06-543126-9	—	—
130. Henshin Shite Miru (変身してみる); 131. Makuai (幕間); 132. Ōto ni Modotte Miru (王都に戻ってみる); 133. Ōto ni Modotte Miru 2 (王都に戻ってみる 2)
30	August 7, 2026	978-4-06-544445-0	—	—
134. Ōto Enjō 1 (王都炎上 1); 135. Ōto Enjō 2 (王都炎上 2); 136. Hisabisa ni Honki Dashite Miru 1 (ひさびさに本気出してみる 1); 137. Hisabisa ni Honki Dashite Miru 2 (ひさびさに本気出してみる 2)
31	December 9, 2026	978-4-06-546049-8	—	—

Chapters not yet in tankōbon format

The following chapters have not yet been collected in tankōbon format:

138. Hisabisa ni Honki Dashite Miru 3 (ひさびさに本気出してみる 3)
139. Hisabisa ni Honki Dashite Miru 4 (ひさびさに本気出してみる 4)
140. Erīna Ruforia (エリーナ・ルフォリア)
141. Ketsui Shite Miru 1 (決意してみる 1)
142. Ketsui Shite Miru 2 (決意してみる 2)
