= Yoshiko Asai =

Japanese voice actress from Tokyo, Japan

- 浅井 淑子
- Occupation: Voice actress

Yoshiko Asai (浅井 淑子, Asai Yoshiko) is a Japanese voice actress from Tokyo, Japan. She works for 81 Produce. She is also a lecturer for the Yoyogi Animation Institute where she holds classes for voice talents.

== Filmography ==
- Kikis Delivery Service – Ketto's grandmother
- L/R: Licensed by Royalty – Mustard's wife
- My Neighbors the Yamadas – Yasushi
- Noir – Mary

=== Dubbing ===
- Cold Case – Ellen Rush (Meredith Baxter)
- Miracles – Madam Kao/Lady Rose (Gua Ah-leh)
