= Kotaro Lives Alone =

Japanese manga series by Mami Tsumura

- First tankōbon volume cover, featuring Kotaro Satо̄

コタローは1人暮らし (Kotarō wa Hitori Gurashi)
- Genre: Comedy drama; Slice of life
- Manga
- Written by: Mami Tsumura
- Published by: Shogakukan
- Imprint: Big Superior Comics
- Magazine: Big Comic Superior
- Original run: March 13, 2015 – June 9, 2023
- Volumes: 10
- Television drama
- Directed by: Kana Matsumoto; Naomi Kinoshita
- Written by: Rin Etō
- Music by: Daisuke Shinoda
- Studio: TV Asahi; Asbirds
- Original network: ANN (TV Asahi)
- Original run: April 24, 2021 – June 26, 2021
- Episodes: 10
- Original net animation
- Directed by: Tomoe Makino
- Written by: Hiroshi Satо̄
- Music by: Yūya Mori
- Studio: Liden Films
- Licensed by: Netflix
- Released: March 10, 2022
- Runtime: 26–27 minutes
- Episodes: 10
- icon

Kotaro Lives Alone (Japanese: コタローは1人暮らし, Hepburn: Kotarō wa Hitori Gurashi) is a Japanese manga series written and illustrated by Mami Tsumura. It was serialized in Shogakukan's seinen manga magazine Big Comic Superior from March 2015 to June 2023, with its chapters collected in ten tankōbon volumes. A ten-episode television drama was broadcast on TV Asahi in 2021.

A ten-episode original net animation (ONA) series adaptation was produced by Liden Films and premiered in March 2022 on Netflix.

== Premise ==
Kotaro Satо̄, a 4-year-old boy living on his own, moves into the apartment 203, next door to Shin Karino, a manga artist.

== Characters ==
Kotaro Satō (さとう コタロー, Satō Kotarō)
Portrayed by: Eito Kawahara
Voiced by: Rie Kugimiya (Japanese); Cherami Leigh (English)
Kotaro is a 4–5-year-old boy living alone in a ramshackle apartment, having fled an abusive father to reside at the Shimizu Apartment complex. He enrolls himself in a local kindergarten and is largely self-sufficient, carrying a toy sword and speaking in the manner of a samurai, inspired by his favorite cartoon character, Tonosaman. Following his mother's death from unknown causes and abandonment by his father, Kotaro lived in a foster facility until his father discovered his location online, prompting his escape. Although a restraining order is in place, his father continues to search for him. A family lawyer covers Kotaro's expenses using funds from his mother's life insurance. Kotaro does not know where the money comes from, as he is unaware that his mother is dead, although he does suspect something about it despite being told that it is from a benefactor.
Shin Karino (狩野 進, Karino Shin)
Portrayed by: You Yokoyama
Voiced by: Toshiki Masuda (Japanese); Michael Sinterniklaas (English)
A lazy but kind manga artist who scrapes by. Upon meeting Kotaro, Shin takes it upon himself to look out for the boy and comes to care for him like a father.
Isamu Tamaru (田丸 勇, Tamaru Isamu)
Portrayed by: Katsuhisa Namase
Voiced by: Junichi Suwabe (Japanese); Kayleigh McKee (English)
A rather loud neighbor of Kotaro's. Isamu is divorced and not on speaking terms with his son, due to his ex-wife keeping him away. Because of this, he tries to be a father figure to Kotaro. It is not known what his job is, but because of how he acts and looks people tend to assume he is a low-level yakuza.
Mizuki Akitomo (秋友 美月, Akitomo Mizuki)
Portrayed by: Maika Yamamoto
Voiced by: Saori Hayami (Japanese); Stephanie Sheh (English)
A neighbor of Kotaro's and a hostess at a local nightclub. While she puts on a brave face, especially in front of Kotaro, it is implied that Mizuki is in a domestic abuse relationship, as shown when she returned home one day with a blemish on the side of her face. Halfway near the end of the series, when Kotaro learns about this, he and the other tenants become concerned; when the situation worsens, Kotaro tells her to move out of the complex for her own safety.
Ayano Kobayashi (小林 綾乃, Kobayashi Ayano)
Portrayed by: Kanako Momota
Voiced by: Yumiri Hanamori (Japanese); Heather Gonzalez (English)
A newer lawyer at the firm that handled the estate of Kotaro's deceased mother. Ayano regularly visits Kotaro to give him money from Mrs. Sato's life insurance. At the insistence of her boss, Ayano stays to play with him; she is one of the few people who knows the truth about Kotaro's mother being deceased.
Aota (青田)
Voiced by: Soma Saito (Japanese); David Errigo Jr. (English)
A private investigator hired by Kotaro's estranged father to find him and retrieve him. He moved into the building and built a relationship with the boy to ensure it was Kotaro. Despite the words of Shin and Isamu, Aota believed that Kotaro's father is the only one who should take care of him. However, a week after he moved in, Kotaro revealed he knew everything about Aota and Aota decided against filing the report, especially after revealing (through old scars on his upper body) that he too is a victim/survivor of child abuse.
Ryōta (亮太)
Voiced by: Kaito Ishikawa (Japanese); Kyle McCarley (English)
One of the older kids at the foster facility that Kotaro was living at before Kotaro left due to his father finding out about his whereabouts; he and Kotaro have a special friendship as he shares his interests of photography with the young boy. He has a fondness for stargazing and even took Kotaro to go see a meteor shower with him. He is later shown working as a construction worker.
Tōko Futaba (二葉 透子, Futaba Tōko)
Portrayed by: Natsuki Deguchi
Voiced by: Yuuka Morishima (Japanese); Jennifer Losi (English)
Kotaro's kindergarten teacher.
Takuya (タクヤ)
Voiced by: Minami Shinoda (Japanese); Griffin Robert Faulkner (English)
One of Kotaro's classmates and friends who he meets on his first day of school.
Sumire Takei (武井すみれ, Takei Sumire)
Voiced by: Mutsumi Tamura (Japanese); Katelyn Gault (English)
An office worker who has moved in to live in the same apartment complex as Kotaro. She replaced Mizuki Akitomo in Room 201 after she left the apartment in Episode 7. She has a fear of children.
Tonosaman (とのさまん)
Voiced by: Rie Kugimiya (Japanese); Cherami Leigh (English)
A cartoon samurai Kotaro loves to watch on TV.

== Media ==
=== Manga ===
Written and illustrated by Mami Tsumura, Kotaro Lives Alone was serialized in Shogakukan's seinen manga magazine Big Comic Superior from March 13, 2015, to June 9, 2023. Shogakukan collected its chapters in ten individual tankōbon volumes, released from December 28, 2015, to August 30, 2023.

==== Volumes ====
No.	Japanese release date	Japanese ISBN
1	December 28, 2015	978-4-09-187355-2
2	September 30, 2016	978-4-09-187788-8
3	August 30, 2017	978-4-09-189625-4
4	May 30, 2018	978-4-09-189882-1
5	January 30, 2019	978-4-09-860211-7
6	October 30, 2019	978-4-09-860411-1
7	September 30, 2020	978-4-09-860717-4
8	September 30, 2021	978-4-09-861152-2
9	June 30, 2022	978-4-09-861322-9
10	August 30, 2023	978-4-09-862552-9

=== Drama ===
A 10-episode television drama adaptation was broadcast on TV Asahi from April 24 to June 26, 2021.

=== Anime ===
In September 2021, an original net animation (ONA) anime adaptation was announced. The series is animated by Liden Films and directed by Tomoe Makino, with story composition by Hiroshi Satо̄, character designs by Tomomi Kimura, and music composed by Yūya Mori. It premiered worldwide on Netflix on March 10, 2022.

==== Episodes ====
No.	Title	Original release date
1	"Episode 1"	March 10, 2022
2	"Episode 2"	March 10, 2022
3	"Episode 3"	March 10, 2022
4	"Episode 4"	March 10, 2022
5	"Episode 5"	March 10, 2022
6	"Episode 6"	March 10, 2022
7	"Episode 7"	March 10, 2022
8	"Episode 8"	March 10, 2022
9	"Episode 9"	March 10, 2022
10	"Episode 10"	March 10, 2022

== Reception ==
By September 2021, the manga had over 1.4 million copies in circulation; it had over 1.7 million copies in circulation by June 2022. In 2018, Kotaro Lives Alone, alongside La La La, won the Electronic Manga Award in the Boys' Category.
