= Hypnosis Mic: Division Rap Battle: Rhyme Anima =

Japanese anime television series

- Key visual

ヒプノシスマイク -Division Rap Battle- Rhyme Anima (Hipunoshisu Maiku: Division Rap Battle: Rhyme Anima)
- Created by: Evil Line Records
- Anime television series
- Directed by: Katsumi Ono
- Written by: Shin Yoshida
- Studio: A-1 Pictures
- Licensed by: Crunchyroll
- Original network: Tokyo MX, BS11, Gunma TV, GYT, MBS, TV Aichi
- English network: SEA: Aniplus Asia; US: Crunchyroll Channel
- Original run: October 3, 2020 – December 30, 2023
- Episodes: 26

Hypnosis Mic: Division Rap Battle: Rhyme Anima (Japanese: ヒプノシスマイク -Division Rap Battle- Rhyme Anima, Hepburn: Hipunoshisu Maiku: Division Rap Battle: Rhyme Anima) is a Japanese anime television series produced by A-1 Pictures created as part of the media mix project of the same name. The series aired from October to December 2020. A second season, titled Hypnosis Mic: Division Rap Battle: Rhyme Anima+, aired from October to December 2023.

== Characters ==
Team	Character	Voice cast
Buster Bros!!!	Ichiro Yamada	Subaru Kimura
Buster Bros!!!	Jiro Yamada	Haruki Ishiya
Buster Bros!!!	Saburo Yamada	Kōhei Amasaki
Mad Trigger Crew	Samatoki Aohitsugi	Shintarō Asanuma
Mad Trigger Crew	Jyuto Iruma	Wataru Komada
Mad Trigger Crew	Rio Mason Busujima	Shinichiro Kamio
Fling Posse	Ramuda Amemura	Yusuke Shirai
Fling Posse	Gentaro Yumeno	Soma Saito
Fling Posse	Dice Arisugawa	Yukihiro Nozuyama
Matenro	Jakurai Jinguji	Show Hayami
Matenro	Hifumi Izanami	Ryuichi Kijima
Matenro	Doppo Kannonzaka	Kent Itō
Dotsuitare Hompo	Sasara Nurude	Ryota Iwasaki
Dotsuitare Hompo	Rosho Tsutsujimori	Kengo Kawanishi
Dotsuitare Hompo	Rei Amayado	Takaya Kuroda
Bad Ass Temple	Kuko Harai	Shouta Hayama
Bad Ass Temple	Jyushi Aimono	Yuki Sakakihara
Bad Ass Temple	Hitoya Amaguni	Eiji Takeuchi

== Production and release ==
The anime television series was announced on December 4, 2019. Funimation streamed the series via Aniplex. The 13-episode series was animated by A-1 Pictures and directed by Katsumi Ono, with Shin Yoshida handling series composition, and Minako Shiba designing the characters. Division All Stars performed the opening theme "Hypnosis Mic -Rhyme Anima-" (ヒプノシスマイク -Rhyme Anima-, Hipunoshisu Maiku - Rhyme Anima -). Buster Bros!!! performed the first ending theme "Kizuna - IKEBUKURO ver. -" (絆 -IKEBUKURO ver.-) from Episodes 1–3, while Mad Trigger Crew performed the second ending theme "Kizuna -YOKOHAMA ver.-" (絆 -YOKOHAMA ver.-) from Episodes 4–6, Fling Posse performed the third ending theme "Kizuna -SHIBUYA ver.-" (絆 -SHIBUYA ver.-) from Episodes 7–9, Matenro performed the fourth ending theme "Kizuna -SHINJUKU ver.-" (絆 -SHINJUKU ver.-) from Episodes 10–12, and Division All Stars performed the fifth ending theme "Rhyme Anima's Mixtape" for Episode 13. The series was originally set to premiere in July 2020, however, due to the COVID-19 pandemic, it aired from October 3 to December 26, 2020.

On March 25, 2023, Evil Line Records announced at AnimeJapan 2023 that a second season is in production. The second season, titled Hypnosis Mic: Division Rap Battle: Rhyme Anima+, features the cast and staff reprising their roles, along with Rina Morita being promoted to character designer, alongside Minako Shiba and chief animation director alongside Hitomi Ochiai. It aired from October 7 to December 30, 2023. The six groups from the franchise performed the opening theme song "Rise From Dead".

=== Episode list ===
==== Season 1 (2020) ====
No.	Title	Directed by	Written by	Original release date (Note: Tokyo MX listed the series premiere on October 2, 2020 at 24:00, which is on October 3 at midnight JST.)
1	"As soon as man is born he begins to die."	Katsumi Ono	Yūichirō Momose	October 3, 2020
2	"Speak of the devil and he will appear."	Ryūta Yamamoto	Yasuyuki Suzuki	October 10, 2020
3	"Two heads are better than one."	Yūsuke Maruyama	Shin Yoshida	October 17, 2020
4	"A friend in need is a friend indeed."	Naoki Kotani	Yūichirō Momose	October 24, 2020
5	"Seeing is believing."	Akiko Seki	Yasuyuki Suzuki	October 31, 2020
6	"He who laughs last, laughs best."	Satoshi Saga	Shin Yoshida	November 7, 2020
7	"The darkest hour is just before the dawn."	Ryūta Yamamoto	Shin Yoshida	November 14, 2020
8	"Dead men tell no tales."	Yūsuke Shibata	Yasuyuki Suzuki	November 21, 2020
9	"Life is what you make it."	Kazuo Nogami	Yūichirō Momose	November 28, 2020
10	"Today is a good day to die."	Akiko Seki	Yasuyuki Suzuki	December 5, 2020
11	"No pain, no gain."	Yūsuke Shibata	Yasuyuki Suzuki	December 12, 2020
12	"You can't make an omelet without breaking eggs."	Ryūta Yamamoto	Shin Yoshida	December 19, 2020
13	"Tomorrow is another day."	Katsumi Ono	Shin Yoshida	December 26, 2020

==== Season 2 (2023) ====
No.	Title	Directed by	Written by	Original release date (Note: Tokyo MX listed the series premiere on October 6, 2023 at 24:00, which is on October 7 at midnight JST.)
1	"Revenge is a dish best served cold."	Katsumi Ono	Shin Yoshida	October 7, 2023
2	"Side with the weak and crush the strong."	Aya Ikeda	Yasuyuki Suzuki	October 14, 2023
3	"Happiness depends upon ourselves."	Yūdai Shimizu	Yukie Sugawara	October 21, 2023
4	"There is little success where there is little laughter."	Yūsuke Shibata	Yasuyuki Suzuki	October 28, 2023
5	"As soon as you trust yourself, you will know how to live."	Akiko Seki	Yukie Sugawara	November 4, 2023
6	"Friendship is a single soul dwelling in three bodies."	Isamu Yamaguchi	Yasuyuki Suzuki	November 11, 2023
7	"Hell is empty and all the devils are here."	Akiyoshi Watamari	Shin Yoshida	November 18, 2023
8	"Each of us bears his own Hell."	Aya Ikeda	Yukie Sugawara	November 25, 2023
9	"The North Wind and the Sun."	Yūdai Shimizu	Shin Yoshida	December 2, 2023
10	"Every new beginning comes from some other beginning's end."	Yūsuke Shibata	Shin Yoshida	December 9, 2023
11	"There are no goodbyes for us. Wherever you are, you will always be in my heart."	Akiyoshi Watamari	Shin Yoshida	December 16, 2023
12	"Tears come from the heart and not from the brain."	Isamu Yamaguchi	Yasuyuki Suzuki	December 23, 2023
13	"Where there's hope, there's life. It fills us with fresh courage and makes us strong again."	Katsumi Ono	Shin Yoshida	December 30, 2023
