= Katsumi Ono (director) =

Japanese anime director

- 小野 勝巳
- Born: January 21, 1974 (age 52)
- Occupations: Director, storyboard artist

Katsumi Ono (小野 勝巳, Ono Katsumi; born January 21, 1974) is a Japanese anime director.

Ono has directed numerous anime for Studio Gallop. Ono has directed Hataraki Man, and two series in the Yu-Gi-Oh! franchise: Yu-Gi-Oh! 5D's and Yu-Gi-Oh! Arc-V. More recently, he has been directing Fushigi Dagashiya Zenitendō, starting from episode 53.

Additionally, Ono has frequently collaborated with screenwriter Shin Yoshida on several projects, including Yu-Gi-Oh! 5D's, Isekai Izakaya: Japanese Food From Another World, Girly Air Force, and Hypnosis Mic: Division Rap Battle: Rhyme Anima, along with its sequel. Both Ono and Yoshida were featured in an interview on the Japanese website Natalie, discussing the anime.

== Works ==
=== Anime television series ===
- Legendz: Tale of the Dragon Kings (2004–2005) - Episode director, Storyboard
- Twin Princess of Wonder Planet (2005-2006) - Episode Director
- Twin Princess of Wonder Planet Gyu! (2006-2007) - Episode Director
- Hataraki Man (2006) - Director
- Yu-Gi-Oh! 5D's (2008–2011) - Director (episodes 1–85, 93–154), Chief director (episodes 86–92)
- Beast Saga (2013) - Director
- Symphogear G (2013) - Director
- Yu-Gi-Oh! Arc-V (2014–2017) - Director
- Symphogear GX (2015) - Director
- Symphogear AXZ (2017) - Director
- Girly Air Force (2019) - Director
- Symphogear XV (2019) - Director
- Hypnosis Mic: Division Rap Battle: Rhyme Anima (2020) - Director
- Fushigi Dagashiya Zenitendō (2022–present) - Director
- Skeleton Knight in Another World (2022) - Director
- Hypnosis Mic: Division Rap Battle: Rhyme Anima + (2023) - Director
- Captain Tsubasa: Junior Youth Arc (2023–present) - Director
- A Terrified Teacher at Ghoul School! (2024-2025) - Director
- I Left My A-Rank Party to Help My Former Students Reach the Dungeon Depths! (2025) - Director
- Psyren (2026) - Director

=== Original net animation ===
- Isekai Izakaya: Japanese Food From Another World (2018) - Director

=== Films ===
- Yu-Gi-Oh! Bonds Beyond Time (2010) - Supervision
