= Yuuka Morishima =

Japanese voice actress (born 1997)

- 森嶋 優花
- Born: 16 March 1997 (age 29); Kyoto Prefecture, Japan
- Occupations: Voice actress; singer
- Years active: 2017–present
- Employer: 81 Produce
- Notable work: Wake Up, Girls! New Chapter! as Otome Morishima; How Not to Summon a Demon Lord as Mei; Kiratto Pri Chan as Mel Shido; Girly Air Force as Gripen

Yuuka Morishima (森嶋 優花, Morishima Yūka; born 16 March 1997) is a Japanese voice actress from Kyoto Prefecture, affiliated with 81 Produce. After some unsuccessful auditions, she won an audition to star as Otome Morishima in Wake Up, Girls! New Chapter! and therefore was part of the unit Run Girls, Run! until their dissolution in 2023. She has also starred as Mei in How Not to Summon a Demon Lord, Mel Shido in Kiratto Pri Chan, Gripen in Girly Air Force and Tōko Futaba in Kotaro Lives Alone.

== Biography ==
Yuuka Morishima, a native of Kyoto Prefecture, was born on 16 March 1997. She had wanted to become a voice actor since she was a high school student due to her admiration for the voice acting industry. She was a finalist at the 2013 "Milky Holmes Sisters Kanojo Member Scout Audition", which was later won by Ayasa Itō. She was a finalist in Tohokushinsha Film's 2016 Kimikoe Audition.

In July 2017, she passed the "Avex x 81 Produce Wake Up, Girls! Audition 3rd Anison Vocal Audition" and was cast as Otome Morishima in Wake Up, Girls! New Chapter! and made a part of Run Girls, Run!. She was later announced as the unit's leader. She also voiced Mel Shido in Kiratto Pri Chan. The unit disbanded on 31 March 2023.

In June 2018, she was cast as Mei in How Not to Summon a Demon Lord. In August 2018, she was cast as Gripen in Girly Air Force. In November 2019, it was announced that she would voice a heretofore-undisclosed character in Nekopara; the character was later revealed to be Cacao. In 2022, she starred as Tōko Futaba in Kotaro Lives Alone.

== Filmography ==
=== Animated television ===
2017

- Wake Up, Girls! New Chapter!, Otome Morishima

2018

- How Not to Summon a Demon Lord, Mei
- Kiratto Pri Chan, Mel Shido

2019

- Assassins Pride, Myra, schoolgirl, Daisy
- Girly Air Force, Gripen
- Kaguya-sama: Love Is War, female student B

2020

- Nekopara, Cacao

2022

- Kotaro Lives Alone, Tōko Futaba

=== Video games ===
2018

- Brown Dust, Kyuubi
- Gekkō Luster, Ellen Eliza
- How Not to Summon a Demon Lord: Cross Reverie, Mei
- Kiratto Pri Chan, Mel Shido
- Wake Up, Girls! Shinsei no Tenshi, Otome Morishima

2019

- Machimusu: Chikyū Bōei Live, Munich, Kyoto
- Shirohime Quest Sawami, Takatsuki Castle, Tsuchiura Castle

2021

- Blue Archive, Akari Wanibuchi

2026

- Zenless Zone Zero, Sunna
