= Yuuki Matsuda =

Japanese voice actor

Nezumi
- ねずみ
- Born: Takehiro Matsuda (松田 健浩, Matsuda Takehiro); Tokyo Metropolis, Japan
- Other names: Yuuki Matsuda (松田 佑貴, Matsuda Yūki); Nezumi Miki (美木 ねずみ, Miki Nezumi)
- Occupation: Voice actor
- Years active: 1995–present
- Agent: 81 Produce

Nezumi (ねずみ) (Takehiro Matsuda (松田 健浩, Matsuda Takehiro)), better known by the stage name Yuuki Matsuda (松田 佑貴, Matsuda Yūki), is a Japanese voice actor affiliated with 81 Produce. Nezumi is best known for voicing K' in SNK's The King of Fighters franchise. On October 20, 1997, he changed his legal name to Nezumi Miki (美木 ねずみ, Miki Nezumi). He later changed his legal name to Nezumi on April 1, 1999.

== Filmography ==
=== Anime ===
- .hack//Roots (Pirokio)
- Beyblade (Ralf)
- Beyblade G Revolution (Ralf)
- Boogiepop Phantom (Worker B (ep.5))
- D.Gray-man (Pang)
- Full Metal Panic! (Terrorist C (ep.11))
- Gintama (Matsutarou)
- Gravitation (Ken-chan)
- Kaleido Star (Agent)
- Kiba (Stonos)
- Mouse (Male Employee (ep.8))
- Petite Princess Yucie (Cat Soldier (ep.7))
- Psychic Academy (Teruda)
- Saiyuki Premium (Kougaiji)
- Soul Hunter (Emperor Zhou)
- Tenchi Muyo! GXP (Tarant Shank)
- The King of Fighters: Another Day (K' (ep.3))
- Katekyo Hitman Reborn (G)

=== Video games ===
- KOF: Maximum Impact (K')
- Neo Geo Battle Coliseum (K')
- The King of Fighters '99 (K')
- The King of Fighters 2000 (K')
- The King of Fighters 2001 (K')
- The King of Fighters 2002 (K')
- The King of Fighters 2003 (K')
- The King of Fighters XI (K')
- The King of Fighters XIII (K')
- The King of Fighters Neowave (K')
- The King of Fighters 2002: Unlimited Match (K')

=== Drama CD ===
- Samurai Tamashii -Samurai Spirits- (Samurai)
- Shinsetsu Samurai Spirits Bushido Retsuden (Thief)
- The King of Fighters '96 (Soldier)
- The King of Fighters '97 ~Shukumei Hen~ (Announcer)
- The King of Fighters '97 ~Gekitotsu Hen~ (Man C)
- The King of Fighters '98 (Radio DJ)
- The King of Fighters '99 (K')
- The King of Fighters 2000 (K')
