= Kiratto Pri Chan =

2018 Japanese anime television series

キラッとプリ☆チャン (Kiratto Puri☆Chan)
- Genre: Musical; Idol
- Video game
- Developer: Syn Sophia
- Publisher: T-Arts Company
- Genre: Rhythm game
- Platform: Arcade
- Released: April 19, 2018
- Manga
- Written by: Hitsuji Tsujinaga
- Published by: Shogakukan
- Magazine: Ciao
- Original run: April 3, 2018 – May 1, 2021
- Anime television series
- Directed by: Hiroshi Ikehata
- Written by: Kazuho Hyodo
- Music by: Tatsuya Kato
- Studio: Tatsunoko Production; DongWoo A&E
- Licensed by: Crunchyroll
- Original network: TXN (TV Tokyo), BS TV Tokyo, AT-X
- Original run: April 8, 2018 – May 30, 2021
- Episodes: 153
- Anime film

PriPara & Kiratto Pri☆Chan Movie: Sparkling Memorial Live
- Directed by: Nobutaka Yoda
- Written by: Hiroko Fukuda
- Studio: Tatsunoko Production
- Licensed by: SA/SEA: Medialink
- Released: May 5, 2018
- Runtime: 85 minutes
- Other series
- Pretty Rhythm: Aurora Dream (2011); Pretty Rhythm: Dear My Future (2012); Pretty Rhythm: Rainbow Live (2013); PriPara (2014); Idol Time PriPara (2017); Kiratto Pri☆Chan (2018); Waccha PriMagi! (2021); Himitsu no AiPri (2024); Onegai AiPri (2026)

Kiratto Pri Chan (キラッとプリ☆チャン, Kiratto Puri Chan), short for Sparkling Prism Channel, is a Japanese arcade game by Takara Tomy Arts. It is the successor to PriPara and Idol Time PriPara and the third entry in Takara Tomy's Pretty Series.

An anime television series adaptation by Tatsunoko Production and DongWoo A&E began airing from April 8, 2018, to May 30, 2021, It was followed by Waccha PriMagi! on October 3, 2021.

== Plot ==
PriChan is a video streaming platform where idols can stream original content and perform as an idol. Using a special device called PriCast, they can self-produce and broadcast their own channel, and become a PriChan idol.

=== Season 1 ===
Mirai Momoyama and Emo Moegi, ordinary first-year students at Kirarigaoka Middle School, end up making their PriChan debut to succeed their selfish, arrogant classmate Anna Akagi, a renowned PriChan idol. Wanting to upgrade their content, they soon find a new friend who ends up being their producer, a knowledgeable straight-A student, Rinka Aoba, who joins their group as their manager. The three girls form an idol group called Miracle Kiratts, producing content of all types while dreaming about becoming top Pri Chan Idols.

=== Season 2 ===
Following the popularity of PriChan streaming channels, the PriChan idols receive a Jewel Pact and are tasked with competing against the virtual idol Dia. Dia also announces the Jewel Auditions, an event in which idols possessing a jewel-like shine are selected to become Jewel Idols. Idols who pass the audition with a sparkling heart can cause their Kiratto Jewel shine, allowing them to obtain their "Jewel Coords". The Idol who earns the title of Jewel idol gains access to the Diamond Coord, a legendary Jewel Coord that will turn them into a Diamond Idol.

=== Season 3 ===
Kagayaki Corporation, a company that manages Pri Chan Land, announces that it will host a Princess Cup to determine the next generation's top PriChan idol. Mirai and friends try to raise their mascots using the new item called PriTamaGo that was given to them. The PriChan idols must become the princess of most areas to become the Illuminage Queen and receive the Castle Coord to perform for the greatest parade in PriChan Castle.

=== Characters ===
==== Miracle☆Kiratts ====
Mirai Momoyama (桃山 みらい, Momoyama Mirai)
Voiced by: Coco Hayashi
Mirai is a first-year student in Kirarigaoka Middle School in Season 1, later turns into second-year in Season 2 and third-year in Season 3. She is energetic yet clumsy girl filled with curiosity who is often dragged into things by her more lively friend, Emo, due to her desire not to be an imposition on others. Mirai has the ability to find traits in other people that make them shine. Her catchphrase is "Kiratto!" Her image color is pink.
Emo Moegi (萌黄 えも, Moegi Emo)
Voiced by: Miyu Kubota
Mirai's classmate and childhood friend, Emo is headstrong and good at sports. She is well-informed and updated on the latest trends, but can also be fickle. She has a fiery spirit and energetic personality, but she supports her loved ones and decides to become a Pri☆Chan idol after getting into an argument with Anna Akagi, a classmate and idol she gets annoyed by. Her image color is yellow.
Rinka Aoba (青葉 りんか, Aoba Rinka)
Voiced by: Nanami Atsugi
Rinka is Mirai's calm and intelligent classmate with a vast knowledge of PriChan. In ealry episodes of the anime, she acts as a cameraman and manager to Mirai and Emo. When Rinka was little, she and her brother often pretend to have PriCasts and record each other, as if they had their own PriChan to post on. Once Yuzuru started to hang out with other kids, they eventually stopped doing this, which caused Rinka tends to cry a bit due to the rift between them. She later debuted as the third member of Miracle Kiratts. Her image color is blue.

==== Meltic StAr ====
Anna Akagi (赤城 あんな, Akagi Anna)
Voiced by: Yū Serizawa
Anna is Mirai's schoolmate in the same grade but different class. She comes from a rich family and is the heiress to her family business, The Akagi Property. She is charming on the outside but selfish on the inside, often disturbing Emo's business and arguing with her. Her image color is red.
Sara Midorikawa (緑川 さら, Midorikawa Sara)
Voiced by: Yuki Wakai
Sara is Anna's classmate and childhood friend who is always right by her side and usually has to restrain Anna from her wild antics. She is often seen playing her guitar. Her image color is green.
Mel Shido (紫藤 める, Shidō Meru)
Voiced by: Yuuka Morishima
Mel is hot-blooded and intelligent girl who has completed her bachelor's degree in the United States despite being in the same class as Mirai. She returns to be Anna's classmate and forms Meltic Star later in the series after a five-year absence. Her image color is purple.

==== Ring Marry ====
Maria Kanamori (金森 まりあ, Kanamori Maria)
Voiced by: Himika Akaneya
Maria is Mirai's classmate in the second-year of middle school. She likes everything cute and owns the program Cutie Committee to introduce all kinds of girly activities on Earth. Her image color is gold.
Suzu Kurokawa (黒川 すず, Kurokawa Suzu)
Voiced by: Sora Tokui
Suzu is Maria's junior and friend and the owner of a dancing program in PriChan. Although she thought that Maria was troublesome in the first place, she actually cares about her. Suzu was initially reluctant to form a duo with Maria, but happily agreed later. Her image color is black.

==== W Daia ====
Daia Nijinosaki (虹ノ咲 だいあ, Nijinosaki Daia)
Voiced by: Rico Sasaki
Dia is Mirai's schoolmate in her second-year of middle school. She is the creator of the virtual idol Daia and together they are judges at the Jewel Auditions. Dia was initially was reserved and timid with a tendency to run away when someone talked to her, but gained more confidence after befriending the other PriChan idols.
Daia (だいあ)
Voiced by: Rico Sasaki
Daia is the bright and cheerful virtual idol who is the host of the Jewel Auditions.

==== Alive ====
Alice Kagayaki (輝 アリス, Kagayaki Arisu)
Voiced by: Fairouz Ai
Alice is a cheerful and lively girl who is a part-time worker of PriChan Land. She comes from a foreign circus troupe, and came to Japan only to find her long-lost family. Her image color is orange.
Eve Kagayaki (輝イブ, Kagayaki Ibu)
Voiced by: Maria Sashide
Eve is a quiet and sweet girl who is a CEO of the Kagayaki Corporation as well as Alice's twin sister. She is also responsible for organizing Princess Cup and the opening of the PriChan Land in Kirajuku. Her image color is navy blue.

==== Go Go! Mascots ====
Kiracchu (キラッCHU)
Voiced by: Coco Hayashi (Season 1 & 2); Nanami Yamashita (Season 3)
Kiracchu is Miracle Kiratts' mascot. Originally designed by Mirai, she gained the power of the virtual world from Daia and also became a navigator in the Design Palette. When Kiracchu moved to the PriTama GO and evolved further, she works hard to support them. She ends her sentences with "~chu." Her image color is pastel pink.
Melpan (メルパン, Merupan)
Voiced by: Nichika Ōmori
Melpan is Meltic Star's level-headed and responsible mascot.
Rabbily (ラビリィ, Rabirii)
Voiced by: Minami Tanaka
Rabbily is Ring Marry's mysterious mascot who sometimes appears in front of Mirai. She is usually seen alone while searching for her master.

==== Alive's Mascots ====
Solulu (ソルル, Soruru)
Voiced by: Mitsuki Saiga
Solulu is Alice's cold-hearted mascot with the characteristics of a male who quietly watches over Alice.
Luluna (ルルナ, Ruruna)
Voiced by: Hibiku Yamamura
Luluna is Eve's stoic and serious mascot who is always by her side and acts supportive like a secretary.

=== Others ===
Meganee Akai (赤井 めが姉ぇ, Akai Meganee)
Voiced by: Kanae Itō
The manager of the Prism Stone Shop. She often scolds Yuzuru, but is otherwise a friendly woman to Mirai and company. She is a recurring parallel character from Pretty Rhythm and PriPara anime series.
Meganii Akai (赤井めが兄ぃ, Akai Meganii)
Voiced by: Junichi Suwabe
Meganee's partner, who works as a tour guide at the Pri☆Chan Land as well as an announcer of the Princess Cup in Season 3. It was revealed in episode 140 that Meganii is the Prism Stone's store mascot, which is slightly different from mascots such as KiracCHU. He is also a recurring parallel character from PriPara anime series.
Anju Shiratori (白鳥 アンジュ, Shiratori Anju)
Voiced by: Suzuko Mimori
Anzu is a top idol who normally wears disguises and often spends her time wandering through town and frequently indulges in various activities the girls are partaking in. In Season 3, she is judge of the Queen's Grand Prix.
Yuzuru Aoba (青葉 ユヅル, Aoba Yuzuru)
Voiced by: Toshiyuki Toyonaga, Sora Tokui (younger)
Rinka's older brother, who works at the Prism Stone Shop as a cameraman, then the manager of Dear Crown by Season 3. He was also a member of Arrows before he left for the group cause an unknown reasons. He is often scolded by Meganee.
Konomi Arakaki (新柿 このみ, Arakaki Konomi), Tamaki Kurihara (栗原 たまき, Kurihara Tamaki), Hokuto Imozaki (芋崎 ほくと, Imozaki Hokuto)
Voiced by: Narumi Kaho, Yurina Amami, Yui Fukuo
Mirai's classmates across all three years in middle school.
Rui Ninomae (一 るい, Ninomae Rui)
Voiced by: Hazuki Ogino
Takaya Saigusa (三枝 タカヤ, Saigusa Takaya), Hanakura Ayumi (花倉 アユミ, Hanakura Ayumi)
Voiced by: Wataru Urata, Amatsuki
Yuzuru's former teammates, who are members of male idol group Arrows.
Devi Fudo (歩堂デヴィ, Fudo Devi) and Luu Asuka (明日香ルゥ, Asuka Ruu)
Voiced by: Saki Yamakita (Devi), Azuki Shibuya (Luu)
are a troublemakers of Oshama Tricks. They always put pranks on their fans, often taunting them with curses.
Aira Nanahoshi (七星 あいら, Nanahoshi Aira)
Voiced by: Kana Asumi
Sweet Honey's Brand Designer who is the member of Designers Thirteen, she is the parallel version of Aira Harune from Pretty Rhythm: Aurora Dream.
Naru Shiawase (幸瀬 なる, Shiawase Naru)
Voiced by: Emiri Katō
Manager of Dear Crown and the mentor to Ring Marry, Naru is the parallel version of Naru Ayase from Pretty Rhythm: Rainbow Live. She is also the author of The Princess of the Jewel Kingdom book, which inspired Nijinosaki to create Jewel Auditions.
Yui Gekikawa (激川 ゆい, Gekikawa Yui)
Voiced by: Arisa Date
The optimistic and hard-working owner of Dreamy Rice area, she is the parallel version of Yui Yumekawa from Idol Time PriPara. Her catchphrase is "Gekikawa!"
Laala (らぁら, Raara)
Voiced by: Himika Akaneya
is Yui's mascot based on Laala Manaka from PriPara, even though her mascot form resembles Kuma from Pripara. She cares about Yui, going as far as to hide the unfriendly comments made about the Rice area's rice and encouraging her to not give up. Her catchphrase is "Kashkuma!"
Bugcchu (バグッチュ, Bagucchu)
Voiced by: Tomori Kusunoki
is Oshama Tricks' rogue malware bug mascot created from the virtual world. A troublemaker, they display great joy and little terror in causing bugs in the virtual world's system to going out of control.
Silk (シルク, Shiruku)
is Rinka's self-created mascot that was originally designed for the purpose of creating a mascot for the Cute Festival in episode 33.
Hakuccho (ハクッCHO)
Voiced by: Suzuko Mimori
is Anju's mascot as well as assistant. She is also the designer of the brand Little Princess Egg and the member of Designers Thirteen.
Sadame Ginga (銀河さだめ, Ginga sadame)
Voiced by: Rina Honnizumi
Sadame Ginga is the character featured in High School! Kiratto Pri☆Chan: Doki Doki Nyugaku no Sadame & High School! Kiratto Pri☆Chan: Kira Kira Mirai no Sadame.

== Media ==
=== Arcade game ===
Pri Chan arcade games were launched on April 19, 2018. Both games were developed by syn Sophia and published by Takara Tomy.

=== Anime ===
Episode 68 featured a crossover television special with Secret × Heroine Phantomirage! Episode 118 is a special episode to honor ten years of the Pretty series featuring Pretty All Friends idols. On April 25, 2020, it was announced certain episodes from Episode 107 onwards would be delayed due to the ongoing COVID-19 pandemic. On June 26, 2020, it was announced that the anime would resume on July 5, 2020, with episode 107. The anime streamed on Crunchyroll, and aired on MBC in South Korea, and on TVB Jade in Hong Kong.

=== Film ===
An anime film, PriPara & Kiratto Pri☆Chan Movie: Sparkling Memorial Live, was released on May 5, 2018.

=== Music ===
Title	Release date	Length	Label	Ref.
Kiratto PriChan Music Collection	September 11, 2019	1:08:01	avex pictures (EYCA-12637~8)	
Kiratto PriChan Music Collection Season 2	June 24, 2020	2:28:24	avex pictures (EYCA-12992~3)	
Kiratto PriChan Music Collection Season 3	February 23, 2022	3:27:04	avex pictures (EYCA-13639)	
