= How Not to Summon a Demon Lord =

Japanese light novel series

- First light novel volume cover, featuring Shera

異世界魔王と召喚少女の奴隷魔術 (Isekai Maō to Shōkan Shōjo no Dorei Majutsu)
- Genre: Fantasy comedy, harem, isekai
- Light novel
- Written by: Yukiya Murasaki
- Illustrated by: Takahiro Tsurusaki
- Published by: Kodansha
- English publisher: NA: J-Novel Club
- Imprint: Kodansha Ranobe Bunko
- Original run: December 2, 2014 – present
- Volumes: 14
- Manga
- Written by: Yukiya Murasaki
- Illustrated by: Naoto Fukuda
- Published by: Kodansha
- English publisher: NA: Seven Seas Entertainment
- Imprint: Sirius KC
- Magazine: Suiyōbi no Sirius
- Original run: June 24, 2015 – present
- Volumes: 30
- Anime television series
- Directed by: Yūta Murano
- Produced by: Seiji Suzuki; Makoto Furukawa; Souji Miyagi; Hideo Momota; Youko Baba; Yoshiyuki Shioya; Yuuki Yamaoka; Shouta Watase; Takashi Murakami; Tsuyoshi Ochiai; Shinichirou Ozawa
- Written by: Kazuyuki Fudeyasu
- Music by: Yuusuke Katou
- Studio: Ajiado
- Licensed by: Crunchyroll (streaming); SEA: Medialink
- Original network: AT-X, Tokyo MX, BS Fuji, Sun TV
- Original run: July 5, 2018 – September 20, 2018
- Episodes: 12
- Anime television series

How Not to Summon a Demon Lord Ω
- Directed by: Satoshi Kuwabara
- Produced by: Makoto Furukawa; Souji Miyagi; Hideo Momota; Yuuya Yoshida; Nobuhiko Kurosu; Masahiko Itou; Shouji Oosuga
- Written by: Kazuyuki Fudeyasu
- Music by: Yuusuke Katou; Yousuke Yamashita
- Studio: Tezuka Productions (1, 3–6, 8–10); Okuruto Noboru (2, 7)
- Licensed by: Crunchyroll (streaming); SEA: Medialink
- Original network: TBS, BS-TBS
- Original run: April 9, 2021 – June 11, 2021
- Episodes: 10
- Anime television series

How Not to Summon a Demon Lord ULT
- Directed by: Satoshi Kuwabara
- Written by: Kazuyuki Fudeyasu
- Music by: Yuusuke Katou
- Studio: Tezuka Productions
- icon

How Not to Summon a Demon Lord, also known as The King of Darkness Another World Story: Slave Magic (Japanese: 異世界魔王と召喚少女の奴隷魔術, Hepburn: Isekai Maō to Shōkan Shōjo no Dorei Majutsu; transl. "The Other World Demon Lord and the Summoning Girl's Slave Magic") is a Japanese light novel series written by Yukiya Murasaki and illustrated by Takahiro Tsurusaki. The light novels are published in English by J-Novel Club. A manga adaptation by Naoto Fukuda has been running since 2015, and is licensed by Seven Seas Entertainment. An anime television series adaptation by Ajiado aired from July to September 2018. A second season by Tezuka Productions and Okuruto Noboru aired from April to June 2021. A third season produced solely by Tezuka Productions has been announced.

== Plot ==
Takuma Sakamoto is a hikikomori gamer who is mysteriously transported to the virtual world of his favourite MMORPG, Cross Reverie, with the appearance of his own character in the game, the Demon Lord Diablo. The two young girls who summoned him, the pantherian Rem and the elf Shera, attempt to use a spell to make Takuma their servant, but due to his magic ring with the ability "Magic Reflection", the spell rebounds, and both end up with magic collars stuck on their necks, thus becoming his servants instead. With a serious case of social anxiety, Takuma decides to act like his character while interacting with others, and makes use of his high stats and vast knowledge of Cross Reverie's lore to survive in his new environment, traveling along with Rem and Shera to look for a way to remove their slave collars, while helping them with their own personal issues that led them to summon him in the first place.

== Characters ==
Takuma Sakamoto (坂本 拓真, Sakamoto Takuma) / Diablo (ディアヴロ, Diavuro)
Voiced by: Masaaki Mizunaka (Japanese); Eric Vale (English)
Takuma was a Cross Reverie player who controlled the character @Diablo-13, known as the true Demon Lord. He always defeated players, by using better equipment and overwhelming skills, always holding back for being too strong. But one day he was summoned into another world, appearing in the body of his character, Diablo, finding two girls, a Pantherian and an elf, who claimed to have summoned him and that he should be a slave to one of them. But due to his ring's ability, the magic has rebounded back against them, making them his slaves. Takuma has poor social skills, resulting in him speaking as his character to communicate; it comes off idiotic (to readers) since he doesn't grow out of this, despite the fact it causes more problems than necessary.
Shera L. Greenwood (シェラ・L・グリーンウッド, Shera Eru Gurīn'uddo)
Voiced by: Yu Serizawa (Japanese); Sarah Wiedenheft (English)
Shera L. Greenwood is an elf who is one of the two Summoners who summoned Diablo. Unfortunately, she is also a bit of a ditz, adding to the problems Diablo has to fix. It's later revealed that she is the princess of the elven kingdom of Greenwood. The reason she summoned him was to have the strength to live free.
Rem Galleu (レム・ガレウ, Rem Gareu)
Voiced by: Azumi Waki (Japanese); Jad Saxton (English)
Rem Galleu is a pantherian who became a summoner and had no choice but to become an adventurer and continue to demonstrate its strength, her aim being to exterminate the Demon King Krebskulm, which was bound to her soul. Rem typically has to deal with reeling in Sheera.
Alicia Crystella (アリシア・クリステラ, Arishia Kurisutera)
Voiced by: Yumi Hara (Japanese); Sara Ragsdale (English)
Alicia Crystella is an Imperial Knight. She was born as a daughter of a ducal house. She is a demon lord worshiper, whose mind is seriously damaged after seeing the depravity of mankind. She later betrays Diabio's group to destroy humanity by reviving Klem's true form, but fails and then reforms after helping Edelgard.
Sylvie (シルヴィ, Shiruvi)
Voiced by: Rumi Okubo (Japanese); Leah Clark (English)
Sylvie is the Grassrunner Guildmaster of the Adventurer's Guild in Faltra City.
Edelgard (エデルガルト, Ederugaruto)
Voiced by: Emiri Katō (Japanese); Kristi Rothrock (English)
Edelgard is a Fallen (a demonic being). She is shown riding a dragon-like creature, but as she enters into combat she descends from him and fights swiftly with her glaive—this is because her demonic beast was paralyzed out of fear. She commanded the army that attacked the city of Faltra and was the superior of Gregore, but was defeated with the rest of the demonic beings by the supreme magic of Diablo. She later moves to Faltra to serve Klem.
Celestine Baudelaire (セレスティーヌ・ボードレール, Seresutīnu Bōdorēru)
Voiced by: Sayaka Senbongi (Japanese); Marissa Lenti (English)
Celestine Baudelaire is the head of the Mage Association in the city of Faltra. She is thus responsible of the magical barrier around the city. Before Diablo's summoning, she was the only one who knew Rem's secret, and she keeps a close eye on her.
Klem (クルム, Kurumu)
Voiced by: Atsumi Tanezaki (Japanese); Madeleine Morris (English)
Krebskulm is the ruler of the Fallen (demonic beings) who suffers from amnesia. She has a fondness for biscuits. She later turns into her true form after Rem was attacked, being restored to her former self when Rem is revived.
Mei (メイ)
Voiced by: Yuuka Morishima (Japanese); Kimberly Grace (English)
Mei is a catgirl maid and the manager of the Peace of the Mind inn where the protagonists reside.
Emile Bichelberger (エミール・ビュシェルベルジェール, Emīru Byusheruberujēru)
Voiced by: Ryōtarō Okiayu (Japanese); Clifford Chapin (English)
Emile is a warrior responsible of evaluating the level of warriors in the Adventurer's Guild in Faltra. He is self-proclaimed "ally to all women".
Keera L. Greenwood (キイラ・L・グリーンウッド, Kiira Eru Gurīn'uddo)
Voiced by: Akira Ishida (Japanese); Stephen Fu (English)
The perverted brother of Shera L. Greenwood. He wishes to make Shera into his wife to produce a pure-blooded child.
Chester Ray Galford (チェスター・レイ・ガルフォード, Chesutā Rei Garufōdo)
Voiced by: Akio Ōtsuka (Japanese); Brian Mathis (English)
The governor of the city of Faltra and a veteran of the fallen-human war which took place 30 years before the story occurs.
Medios (メディオス, Mediosu)
Voiced by: Sayaka Ohara (Japanese); Morgan Garrett (English)
A slave trader who happens to be an acquaintance of Celestine Baudelaire with whom she shared the same magical instructor.
Saddler (サドラー, Sadorā)
Voiced by: Daisuke Namikawa (Japanese); Anthony Bowling (English)
Saddler is a paladin with a god complex and sadistic tendencies, especially toward demihumans.
Lumachina Weselia (ルマキーナ・ウエスエリア, Rumakīna Uesueria)
Voiced by: Miku Itō (Japanese); Amber Lee Connors (English)
A High Priestess who fled from the church which ordered her death, she is rescued by Diablo and since then views him as a god, despite his attempts to deny it. She is later escorted by Diablo and his party to Zircon Tower City.
Rose (ロゼ, Roze)
Voiced by: Aoi Koga (Japanese); Megan Shipman (English)
A magic automaton maid who was originally a prototype AI-powered NPC that Takuma claimed and assigned to watch over the dungeon created by him. In his shut-in days Takuma usually would talk about his feelings to her and due to her AI functions she was able to respond as she saw fit. She is materialized in the living world of Cross Reverie along with the dungeon and later reunites with Diablo, becoming his most loyal servant.
Horn (ホルン, Horun)
Voiced by: Fumiko Uchimura (Japanese); Juliana Pagan (English)
A Grasswalker demihuman who became a part-timer with Diablo's party, but took temporary leave to study magic.
Fanis Laminitus (ファニス・ラムニテス, Fanisu Ramunitesu)
Voiced by: Chinatsu Akasaki (Japanese); Mallorie Rodak (English)
The governor of Zircon Tower City. She is a magical marksman and later attempts to seduce Diablo.
Gewalt (ゲイバルト, Geibaruto)
Voiced by: Kazuyuki Okitsu (Japanese); Garret Storms (English)
A paladin and summoner sent to hunt down Lumachina. He is later healed by her in an act of mercy and comes to her aid at the royal capital.
Tria (トリア, Toria)
Voiced by: Maki Kawase (Japanese); Kimmie Britt (English)
The paladin who aided Lumachina in her escape. She was seemingly killed by one of Gewalt's summons, but was in fact imprisoned by the church and is later freed by Gewalt as a favor to Lumachina.
Batutta (バドゥタ, Baduta)
Voiced by: Kazuhiro Yamaji (Japanese); D. C. Douglas (English)
A veteran paladin renowned for his piety who Lumachina seeks out in Zircon.
Varakness (バナクネス, Barakunesu)
Voiced by: Shinnosuke Tachibana (Japanese); Bill Butts (English)
A general for one of the Demon Lords who attacks Zircon.
Vishos (ビジョス, Bijosu)
Voiced by: Kohsuke Toriumi
The main antagonist of Season 2, he was the corrupt Head Cardinal of the Church of Lyferia who attempted to kill Lumachina in a coup.
Sanro (サンロ)
Voiced by: Ayumu Murase
Grun (グリューン, Guryūn)
Voiced by: Kazutomi Yamamoto (Japanese); Mark Allen Jr. (English)
Babylon (ババロン, Babaron)
Voiced by: Akane Fujita (Japanese); Monica Rial (English)
A self-proclaimed goddess who dresses like a Japanese high school girl and dwells within a grail found in Diablo's treasure vault. She helps Horn level up her power.

== Media ==
=== Light novels ===
The light novels are written by Yukiya Murasaki and illustrated by Takahiro Tsurusaki. Kodansha published the first volume under their Ranobe Bunko imprint in December 2014. J-Novel Club announced on September 28, 2017, that they had licensed the series for the North American market.

=== Manga ===
Naoto Fukuda launched a manga adaptation of the series on Kodansha's Niconico based manga service Suiyōbi no Sirius in June 2015. Seven Seas Entertainment announced their license to the manga on September 14, 2017.

=== Anime ===
An anime television series adaptation was announced in January 2018. The series was directed by Yūta Murano and written by Kazuyuki Fudeyasu, with animation by studio Ajiado. Character designs for the series were provided by Shizue Kaneko. Yuki Nishioka was the chief animation director. Yuki Miyamoto provided monster designs and serves as action animation director. Backgrounds were provided by Kusanagi, while Natsuko Otsuka was the color key artist. Photography for the series was directed by Teppei Satō at Asahi Production Shiraishi Studio, and Satoshi Motoyama directed the sound at Half HP Studio. The series aired from July 5 to September 20, 2018, and was broadcast on AT-X, BS Fuji, Tokyo MX, and Sun TV. The series' opening theme, "DeCIDE", was performed by the unit SUMMONERS 2+, a group composed of voice actresses Azumi Waki, Yū Serizawa, Yumi Hara, Rumi Okubo, and Emiri Katō, while the ending theme, "Saiaku na Hi demo Anata ga Suki." (最悪な日でもあなたが好き。; "I Like You Even on the Worst Day."), was performed by Serizawa and produced by HoneyWorks. The first season ran for 12 episodes.

Crunchyroll simulcast the series worldwide outside of Asia, while Funimation premiered a SimulDub of it in North America. Following Sony's acquisition of Crunchyroll, the English dub was moved to Crunchyroll. In South and Southeast Asia, Medialink licensed the series.

On April 8, 2020, it was announced that the series would receive a second season titled How Not to Summon a Demon Lord Ω, co-animated by Tezuka Productions and Okuruto Noboru, and directed by Satoshi Kuwabara, with the rest of the staff and cast members reprising their roles. The second season aired on TBS and BS-TBS from April 9 to June 11, 2021. The second season's opening theme, "EVERYBODY! EVERYBODY!", and ending theme, "YOU YOU YOU", were performed by Serizawa with collaboration by DJ KOO & MOTSU. The second season ran for 10 episodes.

On April 6, 2026, a third season titled How Not to Summon a Demon Lord ULT was announced. The series will be produced solely by Tezuka Productions, with the rest of the staff and cast members reprising their roles.

==== Season 1 ====
No. overall	No. in season	Title	Directed by	Written by	Storyboarded by	Original release date	Ref.
1	1	"The Demon Lord Act"; Transliteration: "Maō Engi" (Japanese: 魔王演技)	Hiroki Negishi	Kazuyuki Fudeyasu	Yūta Murano	July 5, 2018	
Takuma Sakamoto, a secluded gamer, is transported into the world of his favorite game, Cross Reverie with the appearance and powers of his own character in the game, the Demon Lord Diablo, where the Pantherian Rem Galleu and the Elf Shera L. Greenwood accidentally fall into an enchantment that bound them to him as his slaves. The trio settle in an inn in Faltra City, where they meet Celestine Baudelaire, the head of the Mage Association. The slave collars around Rem and Shera's necks cannot be removed or destroyed, so Celestine promises to find out how to do so. Suspecting Rem is keeping secrets, Diablo forces her to confess in private that the Demon Lord Krebskulm was sealed inside her body ever since she was born. Celestine is the only one who knows, and they have been working on a way to extract and slay Krebskulm without killing her. Diablo vows to help her with her problem. Later, when Diablo takes a walk, the disgruntled mage Galluk attacks him with a giant, fire-breathing salamander, only to be shocked when Diablo easily slays it. He declares he is Diablo, the Demon Lord from Another World!!
2	2	"The Strongest Newcomer"; Transliteration: "Saikyō Shinjin" (Japanese: 最強新人)	Hiroki Negishi	Kazuyuki Fudeyasu	Masaya Fujimori	July 12, 2018	
Diablo, Rem, and Shera join the Adventurer's Guild, but when they try to measure Diablo's Level, the power-measuring device malfunctions. The guildmaster, Sylvie, is intrigued, then sends them on a quest to slay a Madara Snake in the Man-Eating Woods. Once there, they are ambushed by a squad of Elves who reveal that Shera is the Princess of Greenwood and wish for her to return home, and had been told that Diablo enslaved her. Shera refuses to return because her brother had been pressuring her to marry him and bear his child. The Elves attack Diablo, who easily defeats them. Galluk, the one who told the Elves where to find them and desires revenge against Diablo, comes out of hiding and berates the Elves for their failure, then retreats after being reprimanded by Rem. Shera tells the Elves to return and tell her brother she is never coming home.
3	3	"Fallen Assault"; Transliteration: "Mazoku Shūrai" (Japanese: 魔族襲来)	Wataru Sakaibashi	Kazuyuki Fudeyasu	Yūta Murano	July 19, 2018	
Diablo and Shera are given a quest to deliver refreshments to the guards at the Bridge of Ulug. Emile Bichelberger, who thinks Shera and Rem are unwilling slaves, attacks Diablo and is quickly defeated, then the girls explain the situation to him, so he leaves. As Diablo and Shera make the delivery, the guards report a massive army of Fallen is approaching. Aware the guards will not survive without help, Diablo volunteers to defend the bridge. Back in the city, Celestine tells Rem that she fired Galluk for his actions, then states her suspicions that Diablo is actually a Fallen. Galluk bursts in and hysterically demands to hear that he wasn't fired. He suddenly stabs himself with a cursed dagger, causing his body to be possessed and transform into the Fallen Gregore. Diablo defeats the Fallen left and right, then their commander, Edelgard, appears and challenges him to a duel.
4	4	"Point-Blank War Dance"; Transliteration: "Hakugeki Ranbu" (Japanese: 迫撃乱舞)	Hiroki Negishi	Kazuyuki Fudeyasu	Masaya Fujimori	July 26, 2018	
Gregore pursues Celestine and Rem, aiming to kill Celestine to destroy the protective barrier she placed around the city. When they are cornered, Emile and several adventurers defend them. Edelgard is unable to significantly harm Diablo. When a messenger explains the situation with Gregore, Diablo fires a massive spell called White Nova that erases the Fallen army and most of the land, but to Diablo's amazement, Edelgard is only left naked and is mostly unharmed, and she acknowledges him as a Demon Lord. Diablo teleports himself and Shera back in time to save Emile from death. Vengeful for all the people Gregore hurt and killed, Diablo humiliates him with his magic until he begs for mercy, then kills him. After funerals are held for the people killed in Gregore's attack, Shera attempts to seduce an exhausted Diablo, only to be attacked by a jealous Rem. Sylvie delivers a message saying Shera must be returned to Greenwood within ten days or else there will be war.
5	5	"Imperial Knight"; Transliteration: "Kokka Kishi" (Japanese: 国家騎士)	Toshiaki Kanbara	Kazuyuki Fudeyasu	Tōru Takahashi	August 2, 2018	
Diablo is angered when he learns Shera's brother put a bounty on her. The group meets Chester Ray Galford, the Lord of the City, who asks them to do their best to prevent a war since Shera refuses to return to Greenwood. Chester assigns Alicia Crystella, an Imperial knight, to assist them. Diablo purchases a scythe so he can fight weaker opponents without using magic. Shera is abducted by bounty hunters, but is rescued by the group plus Emile. Alicia berates herself for not guarding Shera better, but Diablo tells her not to be so hard on herself.
6	6	"Slave Market"; Transliteration: "Dorei Ichiba" (Japanese: 奴隷市場)	Kazuomi Koga	Kazuyuki Fudeyasu	Takeshi Mori	August 9, 2018	
Celestine directs the group to the slave trader, Medios, who was once Celestine's colleague in studying magic, for insight on how to remove Rem and Shera's collars. When they meet Medios, she detects Krebskulm's presence within Rem, but Shera thinks she is saying Rem is pregnant. Medios explains a master can remove a collar by pouring their magical energy into their slave's body. Diablo tries it with Shera, but gives up in embarrassment when the process is extremely pleasurable for her. Later, Shera's brother, Keera, arrives and apologizes for the bounty hunters, then tries to persuade Shera to return with him. She reiterates that she will not return, so he leaves, promising that she will return with him of her own free will.
7	7	"Change of Heart"; Transliteration: "Jinshin Henten" (Japanese: 人心変転)	Yoshie Takagi	Kazuyuki Fudeyasu	Yūta Murano	August 16, 2018	
Diablo dreams of his childhood where many of his so-called friends would use him and then abandon him. While alone with Shera, he finds he can easily craft potions. Outside, Keera plays a flute that hypnotizes Shera into leaving with him. Depressed about being abandoned again, Diablo mopes, but Rem and Alicia eventually deduce that Shera was hypnotized and the group plots a rescue. Keera chains Shera up in his tent and interrogates her on her relationship with Diablo, not believing her when she says Diablo did not touch her. Keera unleashes a fabric-eating slime creature to destroy her clothes and prepares to rape her, but the group arrives in time, having already defeated his guards. Keera uses the flute to hypnotize Shera again and make her lie that she wants to stay with him, but Diablo uses his authority as the master of her collar to make her tell the truth, and she says she wants to stay with Diablo and Rem. Infuriated, Keera summons a monster called the Force Hydra.
8	8	"Hero's Charge"; Transliteration: "Eiyū Bakushin" (Japanese: 英雄驀進)	Hiroki Negishi	Kazuyuki Fudeyasu	Masaya Fujimori	August 23, 2018	
Diablo defeats the Force Hydra despite its regeneration by completely incinerating it. Shera asks him to spare Keera as he is still her brother and he agrees, but Chester appears and beheads Keera. Chester has his army round up the already beaten Elf troops and attempts to capture Shera, stating his plans to conquer Greenwood. Chester traps Diablo in an energy sphere and destroys Alicia's sword when she tries to defend Shera. Diablo breaks free and battles Chester, evenly matched, and narrowly wins. Alicia threatens to report Chester's unethical actions to the King, so he surrenders and withdraws his troops. The group heals the Elf troops with potions and comforts Shera over the loss of her brother. Later, Sylvie serves an exhausted Diablo a drink meant to restore energy, but he becomes drunk and mistakes her for a body pillow. He grabs and caresses her, much to her embarrassment.
9	9	"Holy Knight Tale"; Transliteration: "Seikishi-tan" (Japanese: 聖騎士譚)	Toshiaki Kanbara	Kazuyuki Fudeyasu	Takeshi Mori	August 30, 2018	
While Alicia has an audience with the King, she runs into Saddler, an arrogant Paladin, who is going to Faltra City to investigate Diablo. Shera summons a bird called a Turkey Shot and binds it to her with a collar. Diablo teaches her how to take advantage of the Turkey Shot's ability to share what it sees with its owner to improve her aim with arrows. While Shera and Rem bathe in a river, Edelgard appears, saying she is not here to fight but to confirm Rem holds Krebskulm within her. They explain Rem's situation to Shera and Shera promises to help her. Edelgard explains a ritual to be done in three days at Starfall Tower can remove Krebskulm without harming Rem, then leaves after they agree. Three days later, Alicia returns and warns them about Saddler. Despite their attempts to avoid him, he and his followers find them. Saddler condemns Diablo's friends for consorting with a Demon Lord and injures Rem with magic. He then tries to turn Diablo to stone, but Diablo reflects the spell and Saddler is turned to stone. The group goes to Starfall Tower.
10	10	"The Demon Lord's Resurrection"; Transliteration: "Maō Fukkatsu" (Japanese: 魔王復活)	Tomoya Kunisaki	Kazuyuki Fudeyasu	Yūta Murano	September 6, 2018	
Edelgard explains Diablo must pour his magical energy into Rem through her vagina to release Krebskulm. Despite his embarrassment, he does it, and what emerges is at first a towering, hideous demon, but then it transforms into a cute little girl. Krebskulm has amnesia, and when Shera feeds her biscuits, she is enamored with the taste and decides not to wipe out the mortals. Alicia protests, but Edelgard is loyal to Krebskulm and accepts it. Disappointed in Krebskulm's weaker form and refusal to kill, the Fallen Eulerex appears and attacks her, but Edelgard and Diablo drive him away. As they approach Faltra City, Edelgard leaves since Fallen are not welcome. They change Krebskulm's name to Klem to avoid a panic. An exhausted Diablo is embarrassed when Shera and Klem strip and rub against him to donate magical energy. In private, Alicia remembers how she suffered from abusive parents and superiors and wants Krebskulm to wipe out all the mortal races. Meanwhile, Saddler turns back to flesh and vows revenge.
11	11	"The Young Girl Awakens"; Transliteration: "Yōjo Kakusei" (Japanese: 幼女覚醒)	Kazuomi Koga	Kazuyuki Fudeyasu	Takeshi Mori	September 13, 2018	
The group tells Celestine about Klem and she is happy that the Demon Lord is not evil. While separated from Shera and Diablo, Alicia betrays Rem and Klem to Saddler and they are arrested. Alicia's plan is to traumatize Klem until she returns to her true self. Saddler takes them to a church where he intends to torture Rem until she confesses to worshiping a Demon Lord. Diablo and Shera search for them, while a massive army of Fallen marches toward Faltra City. Klem tries to protect Rem, but when Saddler attempts to strike her, Rem shields her with her body and is impaled several times. Klem snaps and returns to her original demon form. Saddler tries to take her down, but is overwhelmed by her true power and is killed by Klem soon after, who then blows up the church. As she rampages, Diablo and Shera arrive. Diablo gives the potions to Shera to heal Rem while he proceeds to fight Klem's original demon form.
12	12	"Battle for Legitimacy"; Transliteration: "Shingan Taisen" (Japanese: 真贋対戦)	Hiroki Negishi; Yoshie Takagi	Kazuyuki Fudeyasu	Yūta Murano; Masaya Fujimori	September 20, 2018	TBA
Alicia joins the army of Fallen and she, Edelgard, and Eulerex celebrate the return of the true Krebskulm. As Shera treats Rem's injuries with potions, Diablo battles Krebskulm and greatly damages her, but cannot keep her down. After Emile protects the girls from debris, Rem reveals she is all right, causing Krebskulm to revert to the little girl Klem. Due to the failure of her plans, the army of Fallen turns on Alicia, but Edelgard holds them off and tells her to flee. Sylvie attempts to kill Klem for the destruction she caused, but relents when Diablo casts the spell to bind Klem to him as a slave and make a collar appear around her neck, as a slave cannot disobey their master. Later, Alicia appears and reveals she sneaked Edelgard, heavily injured from fighting off the other Fallen, into the city and begs Klem to heal her, which she does. Klem orders Edelgard to never kill mortals again. Rem asks Alicia why she did what she did and she reveals her past suffering and desire to wipe out the mortal races. Since Klem will not kill, Alicia attempts suicide, but Diablo stops her and tells her to find a new purpose to live for, then Rem forgives her. Diablo collapses in exhaustion and is embarrassed when all five girls strip and rub against him to donate magical energy. The next day, Edelgard disguises herself as a human and mingles with the people. Alicia leaves for a new journey. Shera and Rem ask Diablo choose one of them to kiss, but he refuses, as he is a Demon Lord and only does what he wants.

==== Season 2: Ω ====
No. overall	No. in season	Title	Directed by	Written by	Storyboarded by	Original release date	Ref.
13	1	"Head Priest"; Transliteration: "Dai Shushinkan" (Japanese: 大主神官)	Fumihiro Yoshimura	Kazuyuki Fudeyasu	Satoshi Kuwabara	April 9, 2021	
Diablo inadvertently rescues the priestess Lumachina Weselia from assassination by the Paladin Gewalt, easily defeating Gewalt and leaving him frozen in ice. As Lumachina had been praying when Diablo appeared, she now believes Diablo is God, which disturbs him. Lumachina explains to Rem and Shera that only God and her future husband are allowed to see her naked, and since Diablo did unintentionally see her underwear either he must be God, or she must marry him. Backed into a corner, Diablo instead insists his identity is a secret, allowing Lumachina to continue believing he is God and appeasing Rem and Shera's jealousy. Lumachina believes the Head Cardinal of her church wants her dead for investigating his corruption, so she had been looking for Head Paladin Batutta for his assistance. Diablo agrees to escort her to Zircon Tower City, as he remembers that the dungeon he built in Cross Reverie is located there. Lumachina also meets Klem and Edelgard and they instinctively do not get along, so Diablo decides to leave Klem and Edelgard behind, though Klem does upgrade Shera's bow to a demonic ebony bow before they leave, to keep Shera safe.
14	2	"Head Paladin"; Transliteration: "Seikishi-chō" (Japanese: 聖騎士長)	Takahiro Tamano	Kazuyuki Fudeyasu	Satoshi Kuwabara	April 16, 2021	
When the group arrives in Zircon Tower City, a child named Horn who had explored the first three floors of a newly discovered dungeon offers to be a guide; the description confirms it is Diablo's dungeon, implying it was summoned along with him. A woman begs a priest of the Paladin Brigade to heal her child of a deadly disease called Death Knell, but is denied because she lacks money. Diablo defeats the priest when he gets violent and Lumachina heals the child. A monstrous sand whale attacks the city and Diablo tries to fight it, but requires the help of Batutta and the city's leader, Fanis Laminitus, to drive it away. Batutta apologizes for his subordinate's behavior, but Fanis heavily taxed the church, making them desperate for funds. Fanis says God is not real and the Church are just swindlers. She tries to shoot Lumachina, and when Batutta blocks it, she says that since God did not stop her, that proves he is not real, then leaves. Lumachina is appalled that many people have Death Knell and are denied healing due to lacking money, but Batutta says they must be pragmatic. Batutta takes the group to his mansion and serves them food. While Diablo and Shera bathe, Batutta and his maid meet Rem and Lumachina for a discussion.
15	3	"Corrupt Ritual"; Transliteration: "Haitoku Gishiki" (Japanese: 背徳儀式)	Tomio Yamauchi	Kazuyuki Fudeyasu	Satoshi Kuwabara	April 23, 2021	
Just as Lumachina deduces that Death Knell is actually a curse, not a disease, she and Rem are drugged and abducted by Batutta and his maid, Shiliu. Horn spied on them and warns Diablo and Shera. Lumachina and Rem wake up tied to crosses in an underground altar where an orgy takes place to extract the evil essence this releases to produce Death Knell. Batutta reveals that he has experienced no tragedy and has no excuse for his actions other than he enjoys being evil. His plan is to corrupt Lumachina with lust so he can make a Death Knell powerful enough to assassinate Fanis. Diablo, Shera, and Horn arrive before Shiliu can sexually torment her. Diablo and Batutta battle with Diablo at a disadvantage because using his power risks triggering a cave-in. Diablo is impaled, but survives and takes off Batutta's arm. Shiliu threatens Rem, but Shera shoots her with an arrow that turns her to stone, while Horn unties the girls. Batutta declares they have already lost and makes a final attack that Diablo counters and Batutta is apparently killed, but this triggers a cave-in. They escape, but discover Lumachina has Death Knell. As she cannot heal herself, Diablo says they must enter the dungeon, as he had stored an item that can heal. Meanwhile, the Fallen Varakness attacks Fanis in her bath and warns her that his army will attack Zircon Tower City soon and then he will force her to join his harem before leaving.
16	4	"Personal Domain"; Transliteration: "Koyū Ryōiki" (Japanese: 固有領域)	Fumihiro Yoshimura	Kazuyuki Fudeyasu	Satoshi Kuwabara	April 30, 2021	
The group is intercepted by Fanis' fleet, as she believes Diablo is working with Varakness. They explain their plan to retrieve an item from the dungeon that can cure everyone of Death Knell, but she doesn't believe them and orders them arrested. They escape when Diablo triggers an earthquake. Gewalt arrives and offers Fanis his services, learning of the dungeon. Four days later, the group arrives at the dungeon deep in the desert, but Lumachina does not have long before the Death Knell will kill her. Diablo conceals the fact that he built the dungeon. After defeating the guardian at the entrance, they encounter a labyrinth. Horn had prepared a map, but it is useless because the walls shift over time, so Diablo simply blasts through the walls. After battling monsters, they are suspended in a basket over a river of lava and must answer trivia questions to pass, which they achieve. To pass another level, they must entertain an army of ape-like White Jaegers with a song and dance routine. On another level, they must move along a narrow ledge above a raging river. Gewalt ambushes them and nearly kills Lumachina, but Horn tackles him and they both fall in the river. Diablo tells the others to keep moving and jumps into the river to save Horn.
17	5	"Black Dragon Clash"; Transliteration: "Kokuryū Gekitotsu" (Japanese: 黒竜激突)	Kinji Yoshimoto	Mayumi Morita	Satoshi Kuwabara	May 7, 2021	
Diablo loses his staff to the river, but saves an unconscious Horn and sacrifices his shirt and cape to make a fire. He removes Horn's wet clothes and is embarrassed to learn Horn is a girl; he thought she was a boy due to her masculine clothing. She wakes up and explains she is an orphan who dressed as a boy to gain respect. While waiting for her clothes to dry, she says he reminds her of her father. Rem, Shera, and Lumachina get through several floors but are attacked by Gewalt again. A massive black dragon appears and attacks them all. Gewalt summons the fire spirit, Ifrit, but the dragon destroys it and critically injures him. Lumachina heals him despite him being an enemy, but he remains unconscious. Diablo and Horn arrive. Though weakened without his staff, Diablo injures the dragon, who attempts to escape, but the maid golem Rose appears and kills the dragon for cowardice. Diablo recognizes Rose as his faithful NPC ally, while she recognizes him as her master and lets them into the treasure room. They go to a white ox statue that heals Lumachina of Death Knell when she touches it. Diablo gets new clothes and a staff while Rem and Horn reluctantly change into revealing outfits that Diablo explains will strengthen and protect them. Shera puts on a ring she finds. Rose is jealous of the other females in Diablo's life, but is placated when Diablo gives her a hair broach. They prepare to take the white ox statue back to the surface, but Rose uses a viewing screen to show Zircon Tower City is under attack by Varakness' army.
18	6	"Demon Lord Army"; Transliteration: "Maōgun-sen" (Japanese: 魔王軍戦)	Masami Hata	Mayumi Morita	Satoshi Kuwabara	May 14, 2021	
Zircon Tower City's defenders are no match for Varakness' army except for Fanis. Varakness and his wives: a mermaid, a harpy, and a dragon-like banshee appear and attempt to force Fanis to marry him. Fanis shoots him through the heart, but the mermaid heals him. The harpy becomes jealous and attempts to kill Fanis. Diablo takes offense to Varakness saying he is working for a Demon Lord, so his group, including Rose, teleport back in time to save Fanis. Diablo, Shera, Rem, and Rose battle the army while Lumachina heals the injured with Horn assisting her. Diablo is enraged when he sees Varakness flaunting his wives as it reminds him of how he was unable to get a girlfriend in real life. He engages them and quickly kills the wives. Enraged, Varakness attacks but is no match. Diablo kills him while declaring himself the true Demon Lord. With the battle won, Fanis holds a feast in celebration. On the way to the feast, Horn is intercepted by bullies who beat her up and ridicule her and her friends, saying they don't believe Diablo actually saved the city. Diablo rescues her and beats up the bullies. As he carries the injured Horn, she laments that she is so weak, but he says that is okay and she can stay with his group.
19	7	"Little Demon Lord"; Transliteration: "Maō Yōjo" (Japanese: 魔王幼女)	Shunji Yoshida	Yukiya Murasaki	Kenji Setō; Satoshi Kuwabara	May 21, 2021	
Fanis attempts to seduce Diablo so he will stay with her, but is rejected. Lumachina decides to go to the Royal Capital to root out the corruption of the Church, but first the group returns to Faltra City. While Lumachina visits the city's church, Diablo and Rose learn Edelgard works at a bakery with Klem and Celestine as the usual customers. Klem warns Diablo that she senses something powerful in the Royal Capital. A criminal organization led by the Measmos family has been pressuring the bakery owner to pay protection money. When some Measmos enforcers come and ruin Klem's meal of biscuits, she beats them up and leads Edelgard, Diablo, and Rose in storming the Measmos mansion, but Diablo has to remind the others not to kill anybody. After taking out all the guards, they confront the boss and decide to intimidate him into doing good deeds to atone for his crimes. As everyone regroups and has dinner, Chester Ray Galford appears and says their actions were witnessed and Klem is accused of being a Demon Lord and must be destroyed. Fortunately, the bakery owner and several others appear and thank Klem for stopping the Measmos, and say the Measmos have been making amends for the people they hurt. Chester concludes anyone who could inspire such goodwill couldn't be a Demon Lord. The next day, the group leaves Klem and Edelgard again and travels to the Royal Capital. Meanwhile, the Head Cardinal learns Lumachina is coming and says he will be ready for her.
20	8	"Visit to the Royal Capital"; Transliteration: "Ōto Raihō" (Japanese: 王都来訪)	Fumihiro Yoshimura	Mayumi Morita	Satoshi Kuwabara	May 28, 2021	
The group arrives at the Royal Capital, Sevenwall, and are accosted by guards, but Alicia Crystella arrives and dismisses the guards, then lets them into an inn she owns. Rose becomes jealous, but relents when Alicia says she would willingly die for Diablo. As they eat, Horn says she wants to be stronger. Rose presents a slave collar and says if Horn wears it and makes a Master-Servant contract with Diablo, his power will flow into her, but Rem and Shera warn that if Diablo dies, she will die, plus other demerits of wearing a collar, so she refuses. After explaining to Alicia what is going on, she agrees to investigate the Head Cardinal, Vishos, but warns that the Law cannot touch the Church. That night, Rose asks Diablo to recharge her magical energy, and he is embarrassed when this involves touching her intimately. The next day, Alicia presents evidence that Vishos and his followers have embezzled funds from the Church and have murdered several people. Alicia wants Diablo to destroy the Church, but Lumachina insists on presenting the evidence so she can excommunicate Vishos and his followers. The group bids Alicia goodbye and goes to the city's holy ground, finding a ground-based church and a massive floating church in the sky. When Vishos appears, Lumachina denounces his crimes and orders him excommunicated, but he counters by accusing her of lying and of neglecting her duties and orders the group seized. His guards and the worshipers believe him and attack the group. Horn gives in to fear, manages to escape, and runs away. Lumachina asks the group not to fight as blood cannot be spilled on holy ground, so they surrender and are transported via a levitating platform to the floating church.
21	9	"Storm the Church"; Transliteration: "Kyōkai Raigeki" (Japanese: 教会雷撃)	Tomio Yamauchi; Yuri Uema	Kazuyuki Fudeyasu	Satoshi Kuwabara	June 4, 2021	
Lumachina is separated from the others and sentenced to execution. Diablo orders the others not to escape because Lumachina asked them not to. Horn inadvertently activates a Holy Grail she took from Diablo's dungeon and a tiny fairy-like girl named Babylon appears. She explains she appears to those who offer blood to the Grail and an embarrassed Horn remembers urinating in it and decides not to tell her. Babylon offers to make Horn stronger, but her spell doesn't work. With little options, Horn puts on the collar. Babylon helps instruct her on her new powers like bewitching men to fall in love with her as they infiltrate the floating church. Just as she reaches the group's cell, a Paladin attacks and injures her. Enraged, Diablo breaks down the door. Horn is disappointed that they could have escaped on their own and so she tied her life to Diablo's for nothing, but Diablo thanks her for snapping him out of his foolishness in obeying Lumachina, as he is a Demon Lord and obeys no one. He gives Horn a healing potion, then defeats the Paladin after a little difficulty. Diablo flies outside and bombards the church with lightning while demanding Lumachina. When she is presented by guards, he sentences the worshipers to death; his plan being that Lumachina will rebuke him to save them and then he will pretend to fall to make Lumachina a hero. His plan goes awry when Lumachina agrees with "God" to smite everyone, believing the worthy will go to Heaven. Suddenly, Vishos unleashes a giant monster called Europa.
22	10	"Pretend God"; Transliteration: "Kami-sama Engi" (Japanese: 神様演技)	Fumihiro Yoshimura	Yukiya Murasaki	Satoshi Kuwabara	June 11, 2021	
Vishos merges with Europa and boasts that he is a god, then starts smashing the church while trying to kill Lumachina. Diablo learns he is protected by a force field, so he asks Lumachina to cast Dispel to destroy the force field, but must protect her as it takes a long time to cast. Rose tries to help, but Vishos destroys her arm. Lumachina casts the spell, but Vishos resists it until the worshipers pray for her, empowering her and allowing the spell to work. With the force field gone, Diablo easily vaporizes Europa and Vishos, but to his chagrin, the worshipers start calling him God. Rem investigates the inside of the church and discovers that Gewalt, out of gratitude for Lumachina healing him, has resigned from the Paladins and killed Vishos' guards, then presents the key to the cell of Lumachina's friend Tria so they can free her. Lumachina decides to stay and repair both the church and its reputation, aware she must also investigate Vishos' connections. Diablo finally convinces Lumachina that he is not God, but she is grateful for his help nonetheless. Horn and Babylon decide to stay in Sevenwall so Horn can study magic, and Alicia takes them in. Rose is repaired and the group returns to Faltra. When Fanis learns what Diablo has done, she decides to visit Faltra to try to seduce him again. Shera brings up the ring she took from Diablo's dungeon and he is embarrassed when Rose points out it signifies marriage. Rem becomes jealous, so he says they will go on a quest to find another ring for her.

== Reception ==
The How Not to Summon a Demon Lord light novels had over 1 million copies in print as of March 2018.

== Censorship ==
On 4 January 2023, the Australian Classification Board refused classification for How Not to Summon a Demon Lord Ω but did not provide a reason, thus banning the series from being sold, hired, advertised or imported to Australia, despite being available for streaming. On 28 June 2023, a censored version was released on Blu-ray with an MA15+ classification for "strong sexual themes and sexualised imagery."
