= 81 Produce =

Voice actor management agency

81 Produce Co., Ltd.
- Native name: 株式会社81プロデュース
- Romanized name: Kabushiki-gaisha Eitiwan Purodyūsu
- Type: Public
- Industry: Voice acting
- Founded: 3 February 1981
- Founder: Michiyoshi Minamisawa (President and CEO)
- Headquarters: BOF2 Yoyogi Park, Tomigaya, Shibuya, Tokyo, Japan
- Key people: Ryūsei Nakao; Toru; Hayami Kentaro; Nishina Takeshi
- Subsidiaries: HALF H・P STUDIO Co., Ltd. Sewedi SP; 81Actor's Studio
- Website: www.81produce.co.jp

81 Produce (株式会社81プロデュース, Kabushiki-gaisha Eitiwan Purodyūsu) is a voice talent management firm in Japan founded on 3 February 1981 (thus the year is the company's namesake). A hybrid CD-ROM featuring voice talent data for members of 81 Produce was released on 19 October 1997. The company is located in Shibuya, Tokyo.

== History ==
In the late 1970s, when the term seiyū was just beginning to take root, some actors were against this, arguing they were full time actors and not just voice actors, a term that sometimes hindered the types of events they could be hired for. Among these people were Toyama Kei and his staff, and this led to the major agency Aoni Production being divided into two camps.

Michiyoshi Minamisawa (born in 1952) joined Aoni Production in 1976, and at the age of 28, he became a figurehead at its forefront. In February 1981, he established 81 Produce (the company's name comes from the year it was founded) with some staff from the planning and production department of Production Baobab. Minamisawa did not aim to become a company president, but he wanted to manage voice actors and produce programs, so he decided to leave the company in order to allow young talents to do their best in a free environment.

It started out as a production company whose main business was producing plays featuring voice actors, such as the musical Fly! Keihin Dracula; and in 1983, it added an acting department and began operating as a voice acting agency.

The company's voice actors often appear in NHK Educational TV productions such as documentaries and school broadcasting programs, and some school broadcasting programs have featured live-action actors (with their faces shown). In addition, the company's affiliated sound production company, HALF H・P STUDIO, is responsible for many of the Japanese dubbing of foreign TV dramas and sound production for anime broadcast on NHK, and for works with episodes of about 5 to 10 minutes, it often casts voice actors affiliated with 81 Produce. It also cooperates with casting for most of the anime produced by Shogakukan's Shueisha Productions. Although not as strong as Aoni Production, it also has strong ties with Toei Animation. It also has strong ties with Avex, and is involved in collaborative activities.

On 19 October 1997, a hybrid CD-ROM featuring voice talent data from members of 81 Produce was released.

In 2015, the "Seiyuu Museum" and "81 Live Salon" were opened in the building where the agency's voice actor training institute, "81ACTOR'S STUDIO" is located.

In 2022, the company held a new "SUN AUDITION" in collaboration with Universal Music.

== Attached talent ==
All names are in Western order (given name followed by family/last name).

=== Male ===
- Shigeru Chiba
- Takuya Eguchi
- Tesshō Genda
- Wataru Hatano
- Katsunosuke Hori
- Naruhito Iguchi
- Ryuzou Ishino
- Hiroshi Ito
- Kent Itō
- Jun'ichi Kanemaru
- Kunihiro Kawamoto
- Daiki Kobayashi
- Arthur Lounsbery
- Yuuki Matsuda
- Shin-ichiro Miki
- Kenta Miyake
- Kōki Miyata
- Yū Mizushima
- Shigeru Mogi
- Yoshiki Nakajima
- Ryūsei Nakao
- Kōtarō Nishiyama
- Ryūsuke Ōbayashi
- Tetsuharu Ōta
- Soma Saito
- Kōichi Sakaguchi
- Toshiharu Sakurai
- Toshihiko Seki
- Mitsuo Senda
- Shigenori Sōya
- Shunsuke Takeuchi
- Kan Tanaka
- Tomohiro Tsuboi
- Hiroshi Tsuchida
- Hidenari Ugaki
- Kousei Yagi
- Takayuki Yamaguchi
- Kunihiko Yasui

=== Female ===
- Himika Akaneya
- Chinatsu Akasaki
- Yoshino Aoyama
- Yōko Asada
- Madoka Asahina
- Yoshiko Asai
- Kana Asumi
- Nanami Atsugi
- Sumie Baba
- Sachiko Chijimatsu
- Arisa Date
- Yui Fukuo
- Sayuri Hara
- Coco Hayashi
- Nene Hieda
- Rina Honnizumi
- Mako Hyōdō
- Tomoko Ishimura
- Masako Jō
- Rie Kanda
- Masako Katsuki
- Yuko Kobayashi
- Kaho Kōda
- Aoi Koga
- Chie Kōjiro
- Kujira
- Motoko Kumai
- Masayo Kurata
- Mayuki Makiguchi
- Miyu Kubota
- Kurumi Mamiya
- Yōko Matsuoka
- Ui Miyazaki
- Marie Mizuno
- Haruhi Nanao
- Chinami Nishimura
- Keiko Nemoto
- Rumi Ōkubo
- Kaya Okuno
- Misaki Sekiyama
- Yū Serizawa
- Chiyako Shibahara
- Azuki Shibuya
- Mari Shimizu
- Anri Shiono
- Yuri Shiratori
- Noriko Shitaya
- Yumi Takada
- Miyu Takagi
- Rie Takahashi
- Minami Takayama
- Aimi Tanaka
- Minami Tanaka
- Megumi Toyoguchi
- Ayumi Tsunematsu
- Reina Ueda
- Rumiko Ukai
- Yuki Wakai
- Fushigi Yamada
- Saki Yamakita
- Erina Yamazaki
- Madoka Yonezawa
- Yukiji
- Ryōka Yuzuki

== Formerly attached talent ==
=== Male ===
- Masashi Ebara (currently affiliated with Aoni Production)
- Yuzuru Fujimoto (deceased)
- Satoshi Goto (currently affiliated with Beckers Act)
- Tetsuya Kakihara (currently affiliated with Zynchro)
- Saburo Kamei (deceased)
- Kiyoshi Kawakubo (deceased)
- Iemasa Kayumi (deceased)
- Kaneta Kimotsuki (deceased)
- Issei Miyazaki (currently affiliated with TAB Production)
- Daiki Nakamura (Contract canceled due to operational troubles at the private school sponsored by Nakamura)
- Hidetoshi Nakamura (deceased)
- Tōru Ōhira (deceased)
- Hiroshi Ōtake (deceased)
- Takahiro Sakurai (currently freelance)
- Nozomu Sasaki (currently affiliated with Aoni Production)
- Daisaku Shinohara (deceased)
- Mahito Tsujimura (deceased)
- Kyousei Tsukui (retired)
- Toshiya Ueda (deceased)
- Hideyuki Umezu (deceased)
- Takeshi Watabe (deceased)
- Kiyoyuki Yanada (deceased)

=== Female ===
- Runa Akiyama (deceased)
- Keiko Hanagata (deceased)
- Emiri Katō (currently affiliated with Stardust Promotion)
- Miyu Matsuki (deceased)
- Tamaki Nakanishi (deceased)
- Saki Nitta (deceased)
- Masako Nozawa (currently affiliated with Aoni Production)
- Noriko Ohara (Freelance now deceased)
- Ai Shimizu (currently freelance)
- Kaoru Shimamura (deceased)
- Emi Shinohara (deceased)
- Asako Shirakura (currently affiliated with Aqua Place)
- Kumiko Takizawa (deceased)
- Kazuko Yanaga (deceased)
- Eriko Ishihara (terminated)
