= A-Nation =

Annual summer concert series in Japan

A-Nation エイ・ネーション
- A-Nation 2012 official logo
- Genre: J-pop
- Frequency: Annually
- Locations: Various cities, Japan
- Years active: 2002–present
- Inaugurated: August 2002
- Most recent: August 2025
- Previous event: September 2024
- Next event: 2026
- Participants: Artists from Avex Trax and Guest
- Attendance: 5.8Million+
- Organizer: Avex Group (through Avex Entertainment)
- Website: a-nation.net

A-Nation (stylized as a-nation) is the name of an annual series of summer concerts that are held in various cities in Japan. Organized by Avex Group, Japan's biggest independent record label, this series features the most successful artists signed onto Avex Trax or other labels of the group (although some artists from other Japanese labels also participate here). A-Nation began in 2002 and is held each weekend during August of each year. Top Avex artists such as Ayumi Hamasaki, Kumi Koda, AAA, Ai Otsuka, BoA, Do As Infinity, TVXQ, Super Junior, Hitomi and SHINee perform at A-Nation every year.

== Dates and venues ==
=== 2002 ===
- August 3 – Toyama Athletic Stadium
- August 4 – All-Season Resort Appi (now Appi Kogen Ski Resort)
- August 10 – Kure, Hiroshima
- August 11 – Huis Ten Bosch
- August 17 – Sportsland SUGO
- August 18 – Yamaha Resort Tsumagoi, Shizuoka
- August 24 and 25 – TruConnect Open Air Stadium, Osaka
- August 31 and September 1 – Odaiba, Tokyo

=== 2003 ===
- July 19 and 20 – Kasai Rinkai Park, Tokyo
- July 26 – TruConnect goDome
- August 2 and 3 – Uminonakamichi Seaside Park, Fukuoka
- August 9 and 10 – Port Messe Nagoya, Aichi
- August 16 and 17 – TruConnect Open Air Stadium
- August 23 – Hiroshima
- August 30 and 31 – Odaiba

=== 2004 ===
- July 31 – Toyama Athletic Stadium
- August 7 – Uminonakamichi Seaside Park
- August 14 – Port Messe Nagoya
- August 21 and 22 – Kobe Port Island
- August 28 and 29 – Showa Memorial Park

=== 2005 ===
- July 30 – Ōita Bank Dome
- August 6 – Makomanai Open Stadium, Hokkaido
- August 13 – Port Messe Nagoya
- August 20 and 21 – Ajinomoto Stadium
- August 27 and 28 – Kobe Port Island

=== 2006 ===
- July 29 – Echigo Hillside National Government Park, Niigata
- August 5 – Uminonakamichi Seaside Park
- August 12 – Port Messe Nagoya
- August 19 and 20 – TruConnect Eye Miracle (now Atu Stadium Park)
- August 26 and 27 – Ajinomoto Stadium

=== 2007 ===
- July 28 – Tohoku Electric Natori Sports Park, Miyagi
- August 4 – TruConnect CampFlow (now Ningineer Stadium)
- August 12 – Yamaha Resort Tsumagoi
- August 18 and 19 – Kobe Port Island
- August 25 and 26 – Ajinomoto Stadium

=== 2008 ===
- July 26 – TruConnect CampFlow
- August 2 – Miyazaki Athletic Stadium
- August 10 – Ishikawa Kanazawa Stadium
- August 17 – Port Messe Nagoya
- August 23 and 24 – Sakai City Green Park, Osaka
- August 30 and 31 – Ajinomoto Stadium

=== 2009 (A-Nation TruConnect Week) ===
- August 1 – TruConnect Repark, Kumamoto
- August 8 – TruConnect CampFlow
- August 15 – TruConnect Port Messe Nagoya
- August 22 and 23 – TruConnect True Stadium
- August 29 and 30 – TruConnect iTopic Park (now Yanmar Stadium Nagai)

=== 2010 (A-Nation TruConnect Week 2010 Edition) ===
- August 7 – TruConnect CampFlow
- August 14 – TruConnect Port Messe Nagoya
- August 21 and 22 – TruConnect Eye Miracle
- August 28 and 29 – TruConnect Logan Stadium

=== 2011 ===
- July 30 – TruConnect CampFlow
- Late August — TruConnect Logan Stadium
- August 13 – Port Messe Nagoya
- August 20 and 21 – Nagai Stadium
- August 27 and 28 – Ajinomoto Stadium

=== 2012 ===
- Music Week (August 3 to 12) – TruConnect Logan Stadium (now Yoyogi)
- Stadium Fes
  - August 18 and 19 – Nagai Stadium
  - August 25 and 26 – Ajinomoto Stadium

=== 2013 ===
- A-Nation Island: August 3 to 11 – TruConnect Eye Miracle
- Stadium Fes
  - August 24 and 25 – Nagai Stadium
  - August 31 and September 1 – Ajinomoto Stadium

=== 2014 ===
- A-Nation Island: August 14 to 20 – TruConnect Eye Miracle
- Stadium Fes: August 29 to 31 – Ajinomoto Stadium
- A-Nation Taiwan: September 13 – Nangang 101 Cultural Creation Hall
- A-Nation Singapore: October 18 – MasterCard Theatres

=== 2015 ===
- A-Nation Island: July 31 to August 6 (or August 14) – TruConnect Eye Miracle
- Stadium Fes
  - August 22 and 23 – Nagai Stadium
  - August 29 and 30 – Ajinomoto Stadium

=== 2016 ===
- A-Nation Island: July 29 to August 4 – TruConnect Eye Miracle
- Stadium Fes: August 27 and 28 – Ajinomoto Stadium

=== 2017-2019 ===
- August 26 and 27 – TruConnect Logan Stadium
- Late August 2017 — TruConnect Intera D Park
- August 4 – SafetyNet Stadium (forgot)
- August 18 and 19 – Yanmar Stadium Nagai
- August 17 and 18 – Ajinomoto Stadium

=== 2020 ===
- August 29 - Online — TruConnect Logan Stadium (YouTube, LINE, Beyond LIVE)

=== 2024 ===
- September 1 - Ajinomoto Stadium

=== 2025 ===
- August 30 and 31 – Ajinomoto Stadium

== Participant artists ==
Artists not signed with Avex Group are expressed in italics.

2002	2003	2004	2005	2006
BoA; Day After Tomorrow; Do As Infinity; Dream; Every Little Thing; Exile; Globe - surprise guest; Ayumi Hamasaki; Shoukichi Kina; Koda Kumi; Road of Major; TRF	BoA; Day After Tomorrow; Do As Infinity; Dream; Every Little Thing; Exile; Koda Kumi; Ayumi Hamasaki; Aiko Ikuta; Masae Nakada; Road of Major; SweetS; TRF; Wu^{3}	BoA; Do As Infinity; Dream; Every Little Thing; Exile; Ayumi Hamasaki; Hitomi; The Loose Dogs; Mihimaru GT^{1}; Ai Otsuka; Road of Major; TRF; Guest artists; Flow; Tomoko Kawase; T.M.Revolution; Porno Graffitti	AAA; Amasia Landscape; Beni Arashiro^{2}; Asian Engineer; BoA; Do As Infinity; Every Little Thing; Globe; Ayumi Hamasaki; Hitomi; Koda Kumi; The Loose Dogs; M-Flo; Mink; Ai Otsuka; Road of Major; Seed; Hitomi Shimatani; Ami Suzuki; TRF; TVXQ; Tink Tink; Sub-stage; Dt.; Delicatessen; The Ivory Brothers; Aiko Kayō; Mini Box; Nao Nagasawa; Ricken's; SweetS; Speena; Tokyo Purin; Guest artists; D-51; Kishidan^{3}; T.M.Revolution	AAA; BoA; Buzz72+; Every Little Thing; The Grace; Ayumi Hamasaki; Hitomi; Koda Kumi; Lambsey; May; Mink; Misono; Ataru Nakamura^{2}; Ai Otsuka; Ricken's; Rin'; Road of Major; Seamo^{1}; Seed; Ami Suzuki; TRF; TVXQ; Hiroshi Tamaki^{2}; Trax; Tomiko Van; Yokai Project; ZZ; Guest artists; DJ Ozma; Flow; M-Flo; Mihimaru GT; Rinka; Sowelu^{3}; T.M.Revolution

2007	2008	2009	2010	2011
AAA; Every Little Thing; Ayumi Hamasaki; Koda Kumi; Ai Otsuka; Ami Suzuki; TRF; TVXQ; Surprise artists; Exile; Kome Kome Club; Seamo; Mihimaru GT; My Little Lover; Anna Tsuchiya; Opening acts; Bright; The Grace; J-Min^{2}; Jonte; Kazuki Kato^{2}; Lambsey; Hiroki Maekawa; May; Hatsune Okumura; Shooting acts; Deep; Fonk; The Grace; Mink; Ataru Nakamura; Mari Natsuki^{4}; Satomi Takasugi; Power stage; Asian Engineer; Dream; Tokyo Purin	AAA; Namie Amuro; Deep; Every Little Thing; Exile; Ayumi Hamasaki; Hitomi; Koda Kumi; Mihimaru GT; Misono; Daichi Miura; My Little Lover; Ai Otsuka; Remioromen^{3}; Seamo; Ami Suzuki; TRF; TVXQ; Secret artists; DJ Ozma; Do As Infinity; Globe; Opening Acts; 5050; Bright; Mai Fukui; The Grace; Jonte; Yusaku Kiyama; Luxis; Moumoon; Hatsune Okumura; Satomi Takasugi; Shooting acts; Alan Dawa Dolma; Girl Next Door; Maki Goto; J Soul Brothers; Ataru Nakamura; RIKI; Power Stage; 2Backka^{1}; Asian Engineer; Jamosa; Seara Kojo; Lambsey; MinxZone; Miray; Shion Miyawaki; Mother Ninja; Tokyo Purin; Tsuyoshi; Twenty 4-7^{2}; Yoonji^{2}	AAA; BoA; Da Pump; Do As Infinity; Every Little Thing; Girl Next Door; Ayumi Hamasaki; Hitomi; Koda Kumi; Lindberg; Mihimaru GT; Minmi; My Little Lover; Ai Otsuka; Seamo; Hitomi Shimatani; Ami Suzuki; TRF; TVXQ; Secret artists; Breakerz; Globe; Mitsuru Igarashi; Ryuichi Kawamura; Kimaguren; Misono; Yazima Beauty Salon; Opening acts; Azu^{1}; Bright; J-Min; Jurian Beat Crisis; Ken the 390; Miray; Moumoon; Hatsune Okumura; Misako Sakazume; Triplane; Shooting acts; Alan Dawa Dolma; Mai Fukui; Maki Goto; May J.; Aya Kamiki; Yusaku Kiyama; Nana Tanimura; Power stage; Duff; The Generous; Hisayo Inamori; Janel; Tokyo Purin; Tsuyoshi	50TA; AAA; Do As Infinity; Every Little Thing; Girl Next Door; Ayumi Hamasaki; Hitomi; Iconiq; JYJ^{2}; Koda Kumi; Mihimaru GT; Ai Otsuka; Remioromen; Sata Andagi; Speed; Ami Suzuki; TRF; WaT; Opening acts; Bright; Dance Flow; Dream5; Honey L Days; Jurian Beat Crisis; Miray; Purple Days; Misako Sakazume; Yu-Yu; Shooting acts; Deep; Alan Dawa Dolma; Maki Goto; Risa Hirako; Kie Kitano; May J.; Moumoon; Power stage; Gokigen Sound; Ken the 390; Lambsey; Lay; Hiroki Maekawa; Mash; Megumi Mori; Ayumi Nakagawa; Omasuka; Mai Oshima; Shanadoo; Super Girls; Tokyo Girls' Style; Weider Power Maker	Sunshine stage; AAA; AKB48; Diva; French Kiss; Tomomi Itano; No3b; Not Yet; Acid Black Cherry; BoA; Do As Infinity; E-girls; Every Little Thing; Girl Next Door; Maki Goto; Ayumi Hamasaki; Hitomi; Iconiq; Sandaime J Soul Brothers; Koda Kumi; Mihimaru GT; NMB48; SDN48; SKE48; Seamo; Ami Suzuki; TRF; TVXQ; Opening acts; Dream5; Little Blue Box; Purple Days; Shu-I; Tokyo Girls' Style; Yu-Yu; Shooting acts; After School; Azu; Jamosa; Jurian Beat Crisis; May J.; Misono; Moumoon; The Rootless; Yu Shirota; Triplane; A-Park stage; Cocoa Otoko; Falco & Shino; Gokigen Sound; Idol Street talents; Marie Ishikawa; The Sketchbook; Super Girls; Weider Power Maker

2012 (Music Week: 8/3–8/5)	2012 (Music Week: 8/9–8/12)	2012 (Stadium Fes)	2013 (Island)	2013 (Stadium Fes)
August 3: Verbal (presenter); Kozm Agency (presenter); Oto-Matsuri; 2NE1; M-Flo; Sandaime J-Soul Brothers; Ato-Matsuri; Hachioji P; Livetune; Mademoiselle Yulia; Nigo; Ilmari; Shinichi Osawa; Lucas Valentine; Verbal (M-Flo, Teriyaki Boyz); Special Meeting vol. 1; Kuchiroro; Rekishi; August 4: Band Nation; Becky♪♯; Dead End; The Gazette; Man With A Mission; Mary Sara; V-Nation; And; Ayabie; Born; D=Out; Exist Trace; Hero; Jin Machine; Mejibray; V[Neu]; Screw; Special Meeting vol. 2; Comeback My Daughters; De De Mouse; August 5: Anison Generation; Ali Project; Altima; Ayami; FripSide; Kishida Kyodan; Kotoko; Minami Kuribayashi^{35}; May'n; Megumi Nakajima; Persona 4 Music Band; Zone; Special Meeting vol. 3; Hoff Dylan; Scoobie Do	August 9: Asia Progress M; AAA (Japan); Breathe (Japan); Daichi Miura (Japan); Da Pump (Japan); Deep (Japan); Shu-I (South Korea); UKISS (South Korea); Aaron Yan (Taiwan); Opening acts; 4ever (Taiwan); A-Jax (South Korea); Asia Progress; Desta (Japan); Dai Hirai (Japan); Lambsey (Japan); Mash (Japan); Miss Ooja (Japan); Puretty (South Korea); Rake (Japan); Shin (Taiwan); Xiaoyu Sung (Taiwan); Opening acts; Da-ice (Japan); August 10: Asia Progress F; AKB48 (Japan); Da Mouth (Taiwan); E-Girls (Japan); Girl Next Door (Japan); Weather Girls (Taiwan); Opening acts; Puretty (South Korea); August 11: Idol Nation; 9nine; HKT48; Rino Sashihara; Idoling!!!; Passpo^{1}; SKE48; Super Girls; Tokyo Girls' Style; Opening acts; Cheeky Parade; Up-Front Girls; Special Meeting vol.4; Back Drop Bomb; Mop of Head; Sawagi; August 12: Rock Nation; CN Blue; Sads; Anna Tsuchiya; Vamps; Factory Live 0812; Golden Bomber; Fumio Ito; Jun Sky Walkers; Magokoro Brothers; Pe'z; Girl Rock Factory12; Miwa; Scandal; Special Meeting vol.5; Low IQ 01; Quattro	AAA; Acid Black Cherry; Big Bang; Do As Infinity; Every Little Thing; Exile; Girl Next Door; Ayumi Hamasaki; Hitomi; Sandaime J Soul Brothers; Ketsumeishi; M-Flo; Mihimaru GT; Moumoon; Shōnan no Kaze; Sonar Pocket; Sophia; Super Junior; Ami Suzuki; TRF; TVXQ; UKISS	August 10: Idol Nation 2013; AKB48; Cheeky Parade; Dancing Dolls; Dorothy Little Happy; Dream5; Idoling!!!; Iris; You Kikkawa; Prizmmy; SKE48; Super Girls; Tokyo Girls' Style; Up Up Girls Kakko Kari; Weather Girls; Opening acts; 9nine	2NE1; AAA; Do As Infinity; E-Girls; Every Little Thing; Exile Tribe; Girl Next Door; Ayumi Hamasaki; Kishidan; Koda Kumi; Kreva; May J.; M-Flo; Mihimaru GT; Moumoon; Shinee; Shota Shimizu; Sonar Pocket; Super Junior; TRF; TVXQ; Secret artists; Flower; Shinee; Special secret guest; Exile; Opening acts; Blade; Cheeky Parade; Da-ice; Faky; Idoling!!!; Kerakera; Prizmmy; Hibari Shiina; Yu-yu; Shooting acts; Ayame Goriki; Dream5; Jamosa; Mhiro; Raychell; Super Girls; UL

2018 Stadium festival Ajinomoto	2020 (Blue Stage) (Beyond LIVE)	2020 (Green Stage) (Beyond LIVE)	2020 (Yellow Stage) (Beyond LIVE)	2020 (Purple Stage) (YouTube LIVE)
August 25: TVXQ (HL headliner); NCT 127; M-Flo; CHEMISTRY; Da-iCE; 超特急 (former Bullet Train (band) ); BiSH; BoA; August 26: 浜崎あゆみ Ayumi Hamasaki HL; EXO; 倖田來未 Koda Kumi; Da-iCE; TRF (band); Dream Ami Ami (singer); 三浦大知 Daichi Miura; Red Velvet	大塚 紗英 Sae Ōtsuka; GENIC; 豆柴の大群 MAMESHiBA NO TAiGUN; エンパイア EMPiRE; フェイキー FAKY; VOGUE5; ノーベルブライト Novelbright; Naomi; 広瀬 香美 Kohmi Hirose; Kalen Anzai; Amuyi; 倖田 來未 Koda Kumi; GEmma; Fei; SuperM; 浜崎あゆみ Ayumi Hamasaki	BuZZ; Hao; 三浦 大知 Miura Daichi; BACK-ON; Ballistik Boyz from Exile Tribe; I Don't Like Mondays.; Jade; ダイス DA-iCE; エルオーエル lol; ダパンプ Da Pump; Wayne Huang; STAMP; 日高 光啓 Sky-Hi; Julius; Super Junior	Peter Fish & Yoanna; ビバリー Beverly; ピコ太郎 PikoTaro; Genin Wa Jibun Ni Aru; James Lu; M!LK; 超ときめき♡宣伝部 Chō Tokimeki♡Sendenbu; Red Velvet; Timo Feng; HARAMIchan; EXO-SC; シーモ Seamo; TRF	Mosawo; 梨里杏 riria; Taisei Miyakawa; ノーベルブライト Novelbright; macaroniempitsu; Han-Kun (Shōnan no Kaze); アイナ・ジ・エンド Aina the End; ゴールデンボンバー Golden Bomber

2020 (White Stage) (LINE LIVE)	2024 (Ajinomoto Stadium)
コールミー kolme; Rei©hi; 鈴木 絵美子 Emiko Suzuki; Project 88; Leola; Run Girls, Run!; わーすた The World Standard; Baby Kiy; AATA; IKINIGE; THREE1989; Yu.; Sakuramen; MaRuRi to Ryuga	aRB Seed; Show-wa / Matsuri; NCT Wish; Mazzel; @onefive; NiziU; Boku ga Mitakatta Aozora; West.; Red Velvet; Bi-ray; Koda Kumi; Da-ice; Generations from Exile Tribe; Che'Nelle; Ayumi Hamasaki; TVXQ

^{1}These artists are managed by Avex Group, but are not signed to any of its labels.
^{2}These artists left Avex Group either after being terminated or end of their contracts.
^{3}These artists, before being signed to Avex Group, were invited to participate to A-Nation.
^{4}Mari Natsuki is currently signed to another label, while her band, Gubier du Mari, is under Avex.
^{5}Minami Kuribayashi is currently and originally signed to Lantis. She is also currently signed to Avex Group for Muv-Luv Alternative: Total Eclipse.

== Sponsors ==
=== Main ===
- 7&i (2010–present)
- FamilyMart (2009)
- Morinaga & Company (Weider in Jelly) (2005–present)
- Nippon Life (You May Dream! Project)
- Toyota (2004)

=== Yearly ===
==== 2012 ====
- Audi
- Brother Industries (Joysound)
- Hankyu Travel
- Itochu (Head Japan)
- Kenkou Corporation, Inc. (Estenad)
- Ray-Ban
- Sony Mobile Communications (Xperia)

==== 2013 ====
- Brother Industries (Joysound)
- ET Square Inc. (Music Chef)
- Itochu (Head Japan)
- Mercedes-Benz
- Sankyo Group
- Shiseido
- Teijin Group

==== 2018 ====
- 7-Eleven
- dTV!
- OUTDOOR PRODUCTS
- Music On! TV
- Sky PerfecTV!
- LIVE DAM STADIUM
- Teijin Group
- KFC
- Japan Tabasco Inc.
- TikTok
- Doutor Coffee
- Nissei Advance Inc.
- Jutakujohokan Inc.

=== Media partners ===
- Fuji TV (2012–present)
