= List of Idol Time PriPara episodes =

- No. of episodes: 51

Release
- Original network: TV Tokyo
- Original release: April 4, 2017 – March 27, 2018

Season chronology
- ← Previous; PriPara Next → Kiratto Pri Chan

The following is a list of episodes of the Idol Time PriPara anime television series. The first opening and ending themes are "Just be yourself" by The World Standard and "Idol:Time!!'" by Arisa Date and Himika Akaneya.

== Episode list ==
No.	Title	Original air date
1	"I Became a Dreamy-Cute Idol!?"; Transliteration: "Yumekawa Aidoru Hajime Chaimashita!?" (Japanese: ゆめかわアイドル始めちゃいました！？)	April 4, 2017
Yui Yumekawa sees a Prism Stone shop opening up and is excited at going. While she is daydreaming, another student in a different school uniform collides into Yui. Principal Bavaria, introduces the student as Laala Manaka a new transfer student from Parajuku. Laala introduces herself but Yui thinks she is joking. After class, she goes to the new store. Meganee registers Yui's brand as Fantasy Time, a brand Yui designed herself. Laala says she'll prove who she is, but when she enters PriPara her appearance remains the same. Punicorn becomes Yui's manager causing her idol time watch to max out allowing her to perform.
2	"Digging Here, Idol"; Transliteration: "Kokohore, Aidoru" (Japanese: ここ掘れ、アイドル)	April 11, 2017
Laala is surprised to find out there is a boy version of PriPara. Principal Bavaria tells all students that PriPara is for only boys and the female idol is the epitome of unseemliness, banning all the girls to go to Girls' PriPara. Laala tries to get some of the other students to come to PriPara but they are only interested in going to BoyPara. The next day, Yui and her two friends, Hana and Suzu, help Laala to finally dig a tunnel to PriPara. After the speech, Meganee announces they are going to have a competition in June.
3	"Yumekawa! Making Drama!" (Japanese: ゆめかわ！メイキングドラマ！)	April 18, 2017
Laala and Yui go to the school dormitory to eat, where Laala notices a book she saw earlier. The Principal begins searching for them but they are helped by another student, Nino, who is out for a midnight run. Nino helps them get into the tunnel to cook ramen with Cooky while using the sheep costumes to stay warm, which helps Yui to make her making drama. After the performance, Meganee reveals that they have brought enough people to PriPara to begin upgrading the facilities. A PriPara Cafe building appears in the main square and Meganee announces the name for the competition in June, Idol Time Grand Prix.
4	"Nice to see you! It's Mirei!"; Transliteration: "Maido puri! Mirei ya de!" (Japanese: まいどぷり！みれぃやで！)	April 25, 2017
Laala and Yui hears that Mirei is coming to Paparajuku. Laala tells Yui to meet Mirei at the Prism Stone Store. Yui meets Mirei, not realising who she actually is instead thinking she is a new idol until they enter PriPara. After Laala explains to Mirei why she looks different, they show her around PriPara. Mirei reveals she is the National Disciplinarian Champion and criticizes Mimiko for breaking school rules by not being courteous to guests. Mirei asks Laala to perform together and Yui asks Meganee to stream the performance over the internet to help promote PriPara. After Laala and Mirei's performance, Laala and Mirei get Super Cyalume Coords and another PriPara building pops up.
5	"Punicorn's Manager Lesson kuma!" Transliteration: "Punikon no Manējā Shugyō kuma!" (Japanese: プニコンのマネージャー修行クマ！)	May 2, 2017
Laala asks Punicorn if she knows how to be a manager. When Kuma arrives in Paparajuku on a delivery, he meets Laala and Yui and decides to train Punicorn. After Punicorn's training, she is able to reserve a venue which causes Laala and Yui's Idol Watches to max out and they do separate performances. During the performances, Head Disciplinarian Mimiko tries to block all the girls from watching the performances in PriPara and wonders how the two got in. After Yui's performance, Punicorn hears something in the clock tower, so she goes into it and meets a mysterious girl playing on a harp.
6	"Dream Dream!? Infiltrating BoyPara!"; Transliteration: "Yume yume!? Danpuri Sennyū!" (Japanese: ユメユメ！？男プリ潜入！)	May 9, 2017
Laala decides to infiltrate BoyPara to see what it is like. At BoyPara, the girls watch a performance by the top boy group With. Yui becomes jealous of her brother Shougo and tries to ruin his performance, but ends up being saved by Shougo. After With's concert, Meganii explains that he is in charge of both BoyPara and GirlPara. Meganii asks some advice to Yui and Laala and Yui's Idol Watch maxes out. She does a performance that even With in BoyPara watch. Shougo gets annoyed that Yui interrupted his show and drew some of the spotlight, but the other members of With do like her show.
7	"Sophy is Coming!"; Transliteration: "Sofi ga Yatte Kūru!" (Japanese: そふぃがやってクール！)	May 16, 2017
As the TV live prepares to start, everyone realises Sophy hasn't arrived yet. Laala asks Yui to go find Sophy while she stalls the TV broadcast. Yui finds Sophy who is in fantasy mode and doesn't realize who it is. Mimiko turns up and tries to stop Yui from helping Sophy before she too questions Sophy's identity. After Mimiko leaves, Nino arrives and asks if Yui and Sophy needs help and she carries them both to PriPara. Sophy gives a stunning performance that boosts ratings and gets a Super Cyalume Coord while Nino is seen watching the show.
8	"Aim for the Rice!"; Transliteration: "Raisu o Nerae!" (Japanese: ライスをねらえ！)	May 23, 2017
Yui and Laala want to invite Sophy and Mirei to the Idol Time Grand Prix Contest in Paparajuku, but Meganee tells them both that only new idols that are registered in Paparajuku can participate. They follow her to her sport activities and say that Nino must come to PriPara if they win. Yui and Laala get their Idol Watches max out for trying and they perform together. After performing together, Nino says that there is a connection between idols and sports.
9	"Grand Opening of the Fashion Studio"; Transliteration: "Oshare Sutajio Hajime Tatteno" (Japanese: おしゃれスタジオ始めたっての)	May 30, 2017
Yui and Laala are startled by Chiako, who sneaks up on them and does their hair. Impressed with Chiako's skill, they drag her to PriPara and convince her to open a fashion store. Chiako begins styling girls and her area upgrades into a shack which causes a lot of people to come to PriPara. The Sheep Squad arrives and argues with Yui and Laala that Chiako should stop going to PriPara. Afterwards, the fashion studio upgrades to a proper store, with the Sheep Squad saying that Chiako will accept to become a Stylist in PriPara but she can still go to BoyPara.
10	"I Became a Helper Idol"; Transliteration: "Suketto Aidoru Hajimetassu!" (Japanese: 助っ人アイドル始めたっす！)	June 6, 2017
Laala and Yui try to do a showroom in Paparajuku Sports Competition selling rice balls, which but are unsuccessful. Nino meets Sion who proves to be better than Nino and Nino loses the game. Sion tells her that she is an idol trying to hone her skill. In paintball, Laala and Yui team up to get Nino but she gets the pair of them instead. Nino then decides to go with Yui and Laala to PriPara, where she registers the brand Neon Drop, and her Idol Watch maxes out for helping Laala and Yui. Laala and Yui tell her about the upcoming Idol Time Grand Prix which is held on Sunday.
11	"Throw it! Idol Time Grand Prix"; Transliteration: "Nagero! Aidoru Taimu Guran Puri" (Japanese: 投げろ！アイドルタイムグランプリ)	June 13, 2017
The day of the first Idol Time Grand Prix arrives, but Nino has a softball match. However, Nino finds out that the match was going to be called off until a substitute team appears. Mimiko secretly reveals she sabotaged the guest team in order to replace them with the intent of making Nino miss the Grand Prix. The Grand Prix starts with SoLaMi SMILE opening then stalling until Nino finishes the softball match. Sion arrives and helps Nino turn things around, but leaves before the end, saying they can do it on their own if they try.
12	"Hit it! Idol Time Grand Prix"; Transliteration: "Ute! Aidoru Taimu Guran Puri" (Japanese: 打て！アイドルタイムグランプリ)	June 20, 2017
When Yui injured her ankle, Principal Bavaria arrives to protect Yui from going to PriPara and performing with her injured ankle. However, Yui does her performance successfully and managed to inspire Nino. Nino's team win the game with the help of Dorothy and Leona, but the Mimiko does not want to let her go. Dorothy and Leona manage to hold Mimiko back and Nino is able to go to PriPara to perform. After Nino performs, Yui is taken to the Time Garden stage for Super Idol Time and meets Falala. Yui receives the Time Coord Hair Accessory from Falala and is announced the winner of the first Idol Time Grand Prix. Principal Bavaria arrives and tells them they can go to PriPara after witnessing Yui's performance, while Mimiko still doesn't want them to go.
13	"Let's go! Parajuku" (Japanese: レッツゴー！パラ宿)	June 27, 2017
Yui and Laala go to PriPara in Laala's hometown, Parajuku. Gaarmageddon finds Mechanee while trying to summon a demon and accidentally active her Self-Destruct, which will destroy Parajuku PripPara if the countdown reaches zero. Mechanee tells them they can stop the countdown if they charge her with Idol energy from performing. After witnessing a test of her destructive power all the idols begin performing in order to fill Mechanee with energy. When Yui comes to she finds herself back in her dorm room at Avocado Academy, thinking everything was a dream. Parajuku was destroyed but Meganii will have it fixed and upgraded to the Idol time system. Meanwhile, Gaarmageddon is banned from Parajuku PriPara because it was their fault.
14	"Gaarmageddon is Coming!"; Transliteration: "Gaarumagedon ga Kita!" (Japanese: ガァルマゲドンがきた！)	July 4, 2017
Mikan and Aroma get transferred to Avocado Private Academy from being expelled from Parajuku PriPara, causing a lot of trouble in their new school. Nino gets idol training help from Dorothy and Reona, while Mikan and Aroma meet Michiru. Aroma forces Michiru to become her demonlet, saying she will exorcise the spirit sat on her shoulder and relieve her stiffness. Laala and Yui go with Aroma and Mikan to meet Garuru in PriPara and Gaarmageddon get their Idol Watches max out. Michiru does not want to become a demonlet, she just wants something to relieve her stiff shoulder but cannot seem to stand up to Aroma.
15	"The Fulling Michiru"; Transliteration: "Mīchiru Michiru" (Japanese: ミーチルみちる)	July 11, 2017
Aroma and Mikan convince Michiru to come to PriPara, with Aroma designing a new brand called Melty Lily for her. In PriPara, Michiru becomes more arrogant and confident, saying she is the princess of the continent of Pu and that her name is Miichiru. Miichiru gets her Idol Watch maxed thanks to Aroma and meets Pitsuji who becomes her manager. She then performs, and everyone hears someone playing the harp. All idols rush to the Clock Tower and meet Falala. When Miichiru leaves PriPara, she reverts to being Michiru. WITH are excited that a new idol debuted in PriPara except for Shougo, who doesn't like girl idols.
16	"Say Goodbye to that Hell"; Transliteration: "Ano Jigoku ni Sayonara o" (Japanese: あの地獄にさよならを)	July 18, 2017
Principal Bavaria asks Laala and Yui to open Mimiko's heart to girl idols. They try to convince her several times, but fail miserably. Mimiko is forced to watch Yui and Laala's performance and remembers that she had a dream before. Mimiko wanted to become an idol when she was young, but her classmates didn't think she will be a great idol. After Laala and Yui's duet performance, Mimiko leaves Avocado Private Academy to set on her journey to find her identity.
17	"The Borrowing Things Battle of Idol!"; Transliteration: "Aidoru Karimono Batorussu!" (Japanese: アイドル借り物バトルっす！)	July 25, 2017
Meganee announces that Pripara will be having a scavenger hunt. Yui is supported by SoLaMi SMILE, Michiru by Gaarmageddon, while Nino is supported by Dorothy and Leona. Michiru's team has to search for an apple, Nino's team has to search for what Sion is wearing on her head, and Yui's team have to search for a signature board signed by WITH. They all get the items but Nino's team is fastest, so she wins the prize, a coupon that allows her to go to PriPara 30 minutes earlier. They are all disappointed by the reward. Leona and Dorothy acted as seniors to Nino which max out their Idol Watches. They do their duet performances and are transported to the Time Garden stage and meet Falala, receiving new Super Cyalume Coords from her. Nino realizes the twins are really good and she needs to work harder to get closer to Sion's level.
18	"Grand Prix! The Escort to Victory"; Transliteration: "Guranpuri! Shōri e no Esukōto" (Japanese: グランプリ！勝利へのエスコート)	August 1, 2017
The second Grand Prix arrives and the three girls compete to win. After each performance, more buildings and facilities appear in the Paparajuku PriPara and it is soon completed. More girls go to PriPara after watching the performances. Nino wins the Grand Prix and meets one of the members of WITH named Koyoi, who escorts her to the Time Garden. Laala and Yume are both happy to see that PriPara has finally been completed. In the middle of their jubilation, they see a girl who they think is Falala and run to her to thank her but she disappears. Meganee informs them that they are to leave Paparajuku.
19	"Hit the Road Idol! Let's Go!"; Transliteration: "Tabidate Aidoru! Rettsu・Igō!" (Japanese: 旅立てアイドル！レッツ・イゴー！)	August 8, 2017
As Paparajuku's PriPara has been completed, Meganee informs Laala that she has completed her duties as a Divine Idol. The girls arrive and meet a girl called Fukiko, who takes them to the Pandai PriPara. When they enter, they are shocked to find out that it had been divided into two parts, where the two team captains are arguing over who should lead the band. The captains decide to hold a competition to see who would win the votes of the band members. After explaining how they came to be together, Sion tells the girls that they will perform as Dressing Pafè once again. The rivalry between the two captains is settled and the Idol Time System gets installed in Pandai PriPara. Sion tells the girls that she is going back to look for someone who she says is always one step ahead of them.
20	"Happy My Birthday"; Transliteration: "Happī Mai Bāsudei" (Japanese: ハッピー米バースデイ)	August 15, 2017
In Pokkaido PriPara, Pokkaido Meganee wishes Yui a Happy Birthday and gives her a special rice ball. The girls in PriPara say that they want some of the rice balls, but Meganee informs them that they are out of rice so Yui and Laala go out to buy some. On the way, they see Yui's brother and his teammates. The owner of the rice farm tells Yui that he gave her Cooky when she was five years old. When Shougo finds her, Yui apologizes to him and when they reach PriPara, she apologizes to everyone else and performs. After performing, she is escorted by her brother to meet Falala and receives a new Cyalume Coord. Principal Bavaria tells them that they are going to Noodle Town next.
21	"Heart-Pounding! The Unknown Noodles Para"; Transliteration: "Dokidoki! Michinaru Menpara" (Japanese: ドキドキ！みちなる麺パラ)	August 22, 2017
Yui, Laala, and Principal Bavaria arrive in Pakamastu Pagawa Prefecture and visit a noodle shop. Bavaria leave to go to a national principle's summit and Laala and Yui find out that Pakamastu Pripara is in the middle of a Noodle festival. They also meet a girl called Komugi, the daughter of the Udon noodle shop, who aspires to open her own shop one day. Komugi volunteers to make it, but Miichiru steps in when things look dangerous, maxing out her Idol Time Watch. Meganee manages to recover the hologramation control and restore PriPara before Miichiru performs. Afterwards the Idol Time system is installed in Pakamastu Pripara and the girls fins out that the demon was actually Dorothy West.
22	"Pool de Prance Big Race!"; Transliteration: "Pūru de Puransu Dai Rēsu!" (Japanese: プール de プランス 大レース！)	August 29, 2017
As a reward for all their hard work promoting the Idol Time system, Meganee takes Laala, Yui, Nino, and Miichiru to PriPari for a vacation. They meet Falulu and Fuwari, but when they try to get PriPari Meganii to install the Idol Time system, he reveals that Hibiki has taken over the system in PriPari. Hibiki refuses to have the system installed unless they win a swimming race. All the idols compete but Tricolore win in the end and max out their Idol Watches. After the performance, the system is installed. Hibiki is also seen entertaining a girl named Shuuka Hanazono, whom Yui bumped into earlier.
23	"I Became a Hell Idol!?"; Transliteration: "Jigoku Aidoru Hajime chaimashita!?" (Japanese: 地獄アイドル始めちゃいました！？)	September 5, 2017
Upon returning to Paparajuku, Laala, Yui, and Principal Bavaria are surprised to see Mimiko has returned too. Mimiko tells them she went on a journey to find herself and met two old friends named Kaori and Hitomi. The two girls apologized to Mimiko saying they felt bad afterwards. Mimiko announces to the school that she was wrong about idols and everyone gives her their support. Aroma designs her a coord and Mimiko makes her idol debut. Afterwards, it is revealed Mimiko helps out a lot in PriPara and uses her hearing for good.
24	"Showdown! Senior Sion!"; Transliteration: "Shōbussu! Shion Senpai!" (Japanese: 勝負っす！シオン先輩！)	September 12, 2017
While playing in a vacant lot, Laala and Yui discover a group of girls and boys fighting over which is better: GirlPara or BoyPara. However, their argument upsets a local lady who holds a special place in her heart for the lot. Laala, Yui and Nino try to get the children to stop fighting by having a picture card theatre, but Yui's delusion time messes things up. Sion suddenly appears and suggests holding a competition, with Sion and Nino both volunteering compete against each other. In the end, the children see how hard Nino is working and stop fighting. Nino and Sion both max out their Idol Watches and perform in PriPara with the children watching outside.
25	"Dream Dream! Time Slip"; Transliteration: "Yume yume! Taimu Surippu" (Japanese: ユメユメ！タイムスリップ)	September 19, 2017
During night in Paparajuku, a girl is having a dream of being an idol when it is eaten by a strange tapir like mascot and the girl forgets about being an idol. The next day, Laala and Yui are going to PriPara when they spot the girl arguing with her friend. Laala and Yui fall asleep drawing and Yui meets the mascot in her dream. The mascot reveals her name is Paku and proceeds to eat Yui's dream, but Yui's dream power creates so many dreams Paku isn't able to finish consuming them. Laala suddenly appears and the two girls are pulled back in time to meet Falala. Falala reveals her name is Falala A Larm and that Paparajuku had a PriPara in the past. Falala then returns the girls to the present asking them to find Gaarara. Laala and Yui wake up in their room, realizing they shared a dream about Falala.
26	"Cheer Up Michiru!!"; Transliteration: "Ganbare Michiru!!" (Japanese: がんばれみちる！！)	September 26, 2017
Yui and Laala try to find out about Falala and Gaarara in the school library. They see Michiru being bossed about by Aroma and decide to try and help her. Laala and Yui, along with the cheerleading squad, try to get Michiru to be more confident, but she struggles. Aroma, Mikan and Michiru go to PriPara to perform, Miichiru and receives a Super Cyalume Coord from Falala. The next day Laala and Yui are shocked to see that Chiako seems to have given up on her dream of being a stylist, but realize that Paku must have eaten it.
27	"I am Shūka Hanazono"; Transliteration: "Hanazono Shūka de gozaimasu" (Japanese: 華園しゅうかでございます)	October 3, 2017
Shuuka Hanazono, the girl Yui met in PriPari, has come to Paparajuku to open a branch of her brand, Rich Venus. Yui and Laala soon realize Shuuka is obsessed with making money and spending it wisely. She pays Gaaruru to find her a mascot and gets Powan as her manager. Shuuka fills her Idol Watch and performs. Meganii reveals the third Idol Time Grand Prix is happening in a week and that teams can enter, prompting Yui to remember her promise to Falala. Shuuka however says she is going to win it.
28	"The Number One is Coming!"; Transliteration: "Icchibān ga Yattekita!" (Japanese: いっちばーんがやってきた！)	October 10, 2017
Yui is determined to form a team with Nino and Michiru. Nino is all for it having gotten her dream of defeating Sion, Michiru agrees only because Aroma tells her but wonders what Miichiru will say. Outside PriPara, Yui and Laala meet a poor girl, so Yui makes her rice. The girl thanks her and reveals that her name is Mia. Sion shows up having pursued Mia to find out who kept beating her to her goals. Miichiru refuses to join Yui's team and Mia reveals Shuuka is her younger sister, whom she has come to visit to get more money, but Shuuka refuses. Shuuka performs and is escorted to the Time Garden by Koyoi where she receives a Super Cyalume Coord from Falala. Mia reveals she is staying in PriPara and working at the café.
29	"The Great Decisive Battle of Grand Prix!"; Transliteration: "Guranpuri Dai Kessen!" (Japanese: グランプリ大決戦！)	October 17, 2017
The third Grand Prix has arrived and everyone is excited. Yui still can't convince Miichiru to join her and Nino, but Miichiru will consider it if Yui beats Shuuka. Shuuka gets Mimiko to help her to improve to the point of perfection. Yui, Nino and Miichiru all perform before Shuuka arrives at the last minute and claims victory. Shuuka is escorted once again by Koyoi to the Time Garden and receives the Time Coord shoes. Gaarara and Paku become unhappy at the amount of dream that are around.
30	"Gaarara and Pakku are Eating the Dreams!"; Transliteration: "Gaarara to Pakku ga Yume Pakkun!" (Japanese: ガァララとパックが夢パックン！)	October 24, 2017
It's Halloween in PriPara and Meganee announces there will be a treasure hunt. Everyone begins hunting for boxes, with Gaarmageddon doing their best to interfere with everything in order to find the treasure themselves. Gaarara and Paku return to Paparajuku and discover there are more dreams about. Gaarara also reveals she stole Nino's dream when she was younger and tries to get Paku to steal the new dream growing inside her. Gaaromageddon manage to find the treasure, a golden Meganii, and max out their Idol Watches. After their performance, Falala is heard playing the harp in the clock tower.
31	"Revival! Falala A Larm"; Transliteration: "Fukkatsu! Farara A Rāmu" (Japanese: 復活！ファララ・ア・ラーム)	October 31, 2017
After Yui and Laala give a performance, the clock strikes 12, and Falala wakes up playing her harp, while Gaarara falls asleep. Yui and Laala realize that Falala is awake in her tower, just as Punicorn, along with the other mascots teleport to Falala and disappear into her harp. Falala appears on stage and performs but says she will fall asleep again because the dreams are still disappearing.
32	"WITH and Pri×Pri Festival!"; Transliteration: "WITH to Puri×Puri Fesutibaru!" (Japanese: WITHとプリ×プリフェスティバル！)	November 7, 2017
Meganii speaks to Yui, Laala, and the others about a joint show happening soon between GirlPara and BoyPara. Meanwhile in PriPara, Gaaruru is mad about Falala and the idols so she decides to turn the festival into a total failure. WITH performs followed by Laala and Yui.
33	"The Secret of Gaalala Tower"; Transliteration: "Gaarara Tō no Himitsussu" (Japanese: ガァララ塔のひみつっす)	November 14, 2017
Nino tells Yui she can't form a team because she doesn't know what her dream is, but she plans to find out by finding Gaarara. Gaarara appears at Rich Venus and wants to buy some of Shuuka's merchandise. Shuuka tricks Paku into thinking she has a dream to eat then follows Paku to Gaarara's tower. In the tower, Nino finds the jewel containing the dream she had when she was little of becoming a hero idol.
34	"Gaalala's Forest"; Transliteration: "Gaarara no Mori" (Japanese: ガァララの森)	November 21, 2017
Paku sees Gaarara talking to Gaaruru in the forest. Gaaruru tells Gaarara she understands how she feels as she used to be alone at night too. Yui, Laala, and Nino walk into the forest in order to find Michiru's dream but end up lost. Yui tells Gaarara to give back Michiru's dream but Gaarara reveals Michiru never had a dream. Laala and Yui perform, giving the dreams back to their owners. Miichiru also leaves a note to Michiru in her diary about her dream.
35	"The Unknown and the Fulling"; Transliteration: "Michi to no Mīchiru" (Japanese: 未知とのミーチル)	November 28, 2017
Aroma takes her to PriPara to speak with Miichiru who reveals she knows where Michiru's dream is, but will not tell her. The next day, Michiru decides she is going to give up being an idol and asks Yui and Nino to help Falala without her. Miichiru encourages Michiru and that they are both of one mind and will aim for the same dream. Back in Prism Stone, Michiru agrees to form a team with Yui and Nino. Returning to PriPara, Miichiru performs and Meganee announces the date of the final Grand Prix.
36	"The Big Pinch of Dream Eyes Training Camp!"; Transliteration: "Yume Me Gasshuku Dai Pinchi!" (Japanese: ユメ目合宿大ピンチ！)	December 5, 2017
Yui, Nino, and Michiru go on a team building exercise to come up with a new song and making drama for the Grand Prix. Shuuka also decides to do some training so she can be on top form for the Grand Prix. However, Michiru and Nino come to realize how wrong that would be and apologize to Yui. The three girls finally work as a team and get a new song and making drama, performing for all their fans and friends. The only thing they haven't decided is a team name.
37	"Pop, Step, Grand Prix!"; Transliteration: "Poppu, Suteppu, Guranpuri!" (Japanese: ホップ・ステップ・グランプリ！)	December 12, 2017
The Grand Prix starts with Shuuka performing first. Yui, Nino and Michiru find out they can't enter the Grand Prix without a team name and can't come up with one on the spot. Gaarara and Paku also start stealing dreams prompting Yui, Nino and Michiru to get them back, they also come up with a team name just in time to enter the Grand Prix. Yui reveals their team name as My Dream and they perform, after which they are taken to the Time Garden by WITH and receive the Time Coord top from Falala.
38	"Dreamerry Glassesmas★"; Transliteration: "Yumerī Meganemasu★" (Japanese: ユメリー・メガネマス★)	December 19, 2017
After winning the final Grand Prix, My Dream is shocked to discover that Falala is still awake. Falala enjoys some time in PriPara with Yui and the others, talking about her past with Gaarara. Yui wonders if there is a way they can both stay awake. Yui and the others go to find the glasses and thanks to Falala's and Yui's mics, find one pair in the PriPara museum. The glasses reveal that there is a jewel in PriPara. Until then everyone performs for the Christmas celebrations.
39	"The End of the Year! It's Bava Great Cleaning Time!"; Transliteration: "Nenmatsu! Baba Ōsōji dessu wa!" (Japanese: 年末！ババ大そうじでっすわ！)	December 26, 2017
The year is ending and it's time to clean the school to welcome the new year. Principal Bavaria invites her cousins Gloria and Ploria to help with the cleaning. While piling up rubbish bags, Laala, Yui and Nino find a pair of old glasses. Gloria and Ploria then make a mess of the school when they fight over Babario's glasses after hearing they were worn by Shougo of WITH, meaning everyone has to clean again. Shuuka wins a prize for the most tidy room, but is still jealous of Yui for receiving the mic and harp from Falala.
40	"Parajuku Pultra Quiz!" (Japanese: パラ宿プルトラクイズ！)	January 9, 2018
The PriPara is holding a quiz to celebrate the reopening, the winner of which gets to be the first to perform on the new stage. Everyone is divided into pairs and Non hosts the quiz. Yui and Laala turn out to be the winners and get to perform. Afterwards, everyone swaps friend tickets. Sophy suggests that the answer to getting the jewel is to travel back in time. Yui also comes to realize that Laala will leave her one day.
41	"Shuuka and Gaarara"; Transliteration: "Shūka to Gaarara" (Japanese: しゅうかとガァララ)	January 16, 2018
Shuuka continues to perform with the dark mic, not realizing it is stealing dreams for Gaarara. Despite this, Shuuka's popularity is still increasing, and she comes to realize that its thanks to Gaarara. Shuuka gives Gaarara a personalized Rich Venus Coord to perform in as thanks, and Gaarara performs using her own dark mic. Meanwhile, My Dream and Laala return to Paparajuku and find the other half of the broken glasses, but the lens is still missing so it doesn't display the information they need yet.
42	"Dear Mai Friend!"; Transliteration: "Dia Mai Tomodachi!" (Japanese: ディア・マイ・トモダチ！)	January 23, 2018
Shuuka is still angry with Gaarara but tries to ignore everyone's attempts to get her to talk about her feelings. Gaaruru speaks to Gaarara and says she should be honest with Shuuka and apologize, which Gaarara agrees. Gaarara vows never to steal anymore dream and Yui reveals the plan to get the time jewel and reverse the system so both Gaarara and Falala can stay awake at the same time. Thanks to Mia, Yui gets the missing lens from the PriPara glasses.
43	"Burning Up Nino"; Transliteration: "Moe yo Nino" (Japanese: 燃えよにの)	January 30, 2018
My Dream believe that they are the idols who can get the sacred coords and discover that the glasses can tell them if something is true or not. Sion shows up and allows Nino to challenge her. Nino must steal the crown from Sion's head before the end of the day. Nino and Sion suddenly realize Nino has the power to move without thinking. The two go to PriPara to perform, and Nino manages to steal the crown from Sion during the performance. Meanwhile, Shuuka tries to get Gaarara to stay awake.
44	"Call me Michiru-sama"; Transliteration: "Michiru-sama to Oyobinasai" (Japanese: みちるさまとお呼びなさい)	February 6, 2018
Yui and Laala figure out that the wall Michiru needs to overcome is standing up to Aroma, but Michiru is too shy to do it. Aroma and Mikan are called to Principal Bavaria's office. Michiru tutors Mikan and she improves but Aroma refuses help and Michiru becomes worried. She asks Miichiru for advice via the diary about how to be more confident like her, but Miichiru just tells her to be herself and that they are of one mind, Michiru only need find Miichiru in herself. In PriPara, Miichiru performs and is taken to the Time Garden, where Falala gives her the Night Coord.
45	"Fight! Yui vs Shuuka"; Transliteration: "Kessen! Yui vs Shūka" (Japanese: 決戦！ゆいvsしゅうか)	February 13, 2018
Falala reveals that Gaarara will sleep as long as she did as punishment for messing with the time system. Shuuka becomes upset and tells Yui that she is not fit to earn the third sacred coord. The glasses reveal that both Yui and Shuuka are eligible for the coord as their walls are to surpass each other. Falala and Laala continue to search for the third pair of glasses, while Yui trains for the battle with Shuuka. After the performance, the female abominable snowman reveals she had the third pair of ancient glasses.
46	"Traversing Time and Space, My Dream!"; Transliteration: "Toki o Koete Mai Dorīmu!" (Japanese: 時をこえてマイドリーム！)	February 20, 2018
My Dream travel back to ancient PriPara, to the island in the middle of the lake where the temple containing time jewel is. As they arrive, the island begins to sink, but the girls use the sacred coords to stop it. The girls search the temple and use Powan's key to open a door where they find a turtle mascot called Kai-Chan. Kai-Chan reveals she is the guardian of the time jewel and gives it to them. Both time spirits perform together for the first time, after which Falala tells Gaarara that she needs to return all the dreams she stole.
47	"The Panic of Pakku! Rampage!"; Transliteration: "Pakku de Panikku! Ōabare!" (Japanese: パックでパニック！大暴れ！)	February 27, 2018
Paku runs rampant around PriPara destroying everything in her path in an effort to find Gaarara. The others try to convince Paku to stay and be happy, with Yui revealing her dream. Inside Paku, Laala vows to protect Yui's dream and begins singing, causing Paku to become frozen trapping Laala inside her asleep.
48	"Deliver to Laala, Come back Live!"; Transliteration: "Rāra ni Todoke, Kamu bakku Raibu!" (Japanese: らぁらに届け、カムバックライブ！)	March 6, 2018
Everyone is shocked that Paku is frozen solid with Laala trapped inside her. Falala and Gaarara reveal Paku has frozen her time so as not to deal with her sadness, and that the only way to save Laala would be to fill the clock on Paku's forehead. As the clock strikes 12, Paku rewinds it due to how strong her sadness is.
49	"I will born! The Divine Idol!?"; Transliteration: "Tanjō Shichau ze! Kami Aidoru!?" (Japanese: 誕生しちゃうぜ！神アイドル！？)	March 13, 2018
Janice and Jewlie arrive in the Divine Idol Stage to help the idols rescue Laala and save PriPara. The goddesses perform and wind the clock back up, but Paku rewinds it. As everyone argues which team should go for God Idol, Hibiki announces that only one team has ever earned the right, the team that faced SoLaMi SMILE in the Divine Idol Grand Prix: Dressing Pafe. Despite this, Dressing Pafe earns the title of God Idol. They manage to smash the windows on Paku's chest and Falala transports My Dream inside Paku before Paku repairs them.
50	"Fly on the Wings of Dream My Dream!"; Transliteration: "Yume no Tsubasa de Tobe Mai Dorīmu!" (Japanese: 夢のツバサで飛べマイドリーム！)	March 20, 2018
Inside Paku, My Dream try to wake Laala and discover that Paku ate all the dream jewels she and Gaarara collected for thousands of years, which have all lost their shine. While Laala is in a dream state, she meets the spirits of the dreams Paku ate who have all lost hope. Laala tries to convince them there is still hope but begins to get pull into despair. My Dream can hear Laala in her dream but she can't hear them, so they perform inside Paku and manage to wake Laala up. PriPara is restored and Paku is returned to normal. Later, Paku begins to apologize to everyone and Meganii uses the third pair of ancient glasses.
51	"Everyone Gather Together! It's Time to Become an Idol!"; Transliteration: "Mi~nna Atsumare! Aidoru Hajimeru Jikan da yo!" (Japanese: み～んなあつまれ！アイドル始める時間だよ！)	March 27, 2018
Laala will be assigned a new PriPara to promote, but Yui refuses to let Laala leave and tries to convince her not to go. However, Meganii states it's a divine idols job and that Laala needs to move on. Yui and everyone in PriPara prepare a surprise for Laala's departure. They take her to the Pri Fes park where WITH and My Dream are set to perform. Laala and Yui decide not to say goodbye, but vow to meet again, and everyone moves towards a bright future in PriPara.
