= Arisa Date =

Japanese voice actress

- 伊達 朱里紗
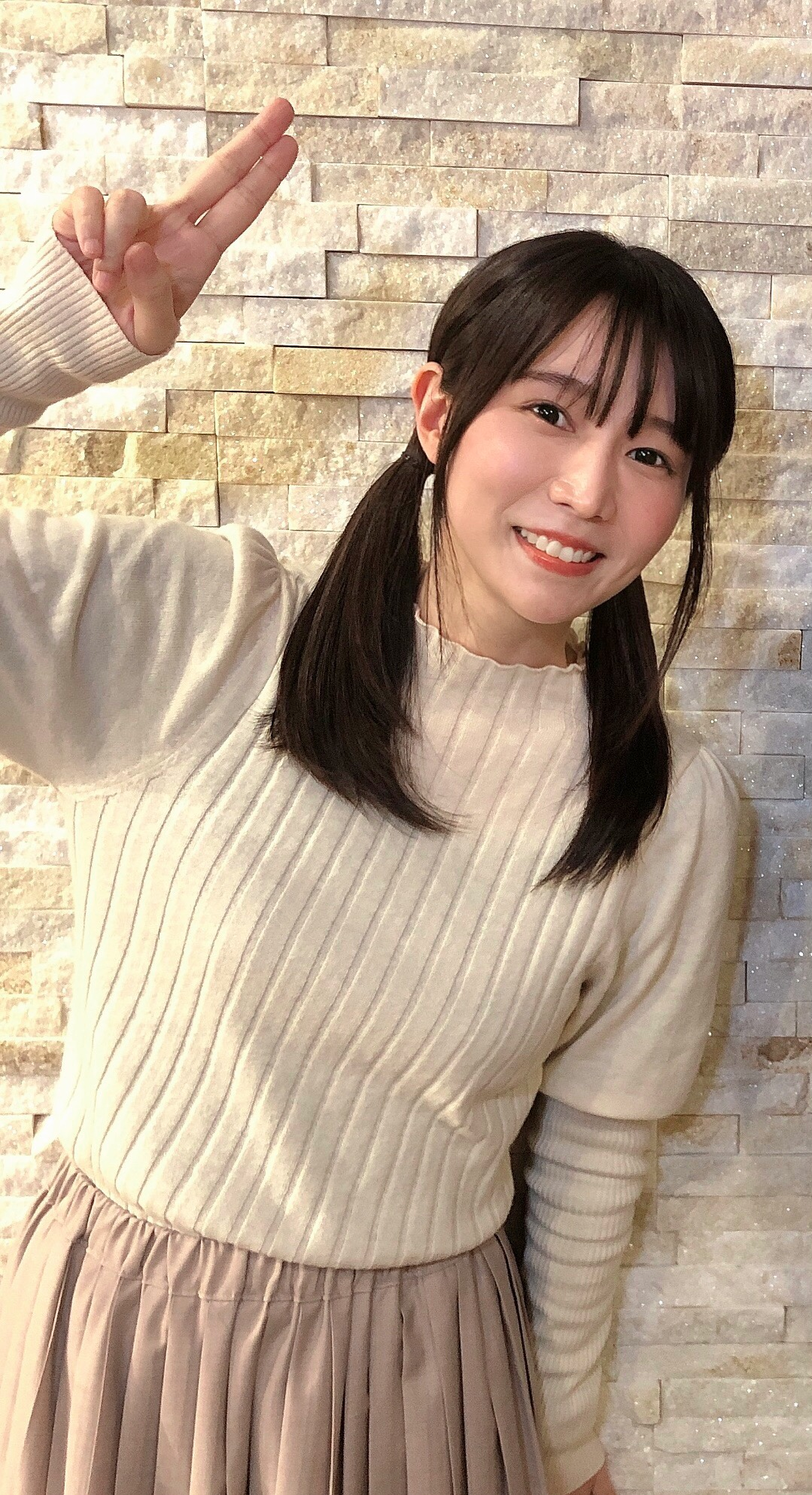
- Date in 2023
- Born: May 10, 1991 (age 35); Hyōgo Prefecture, Japan
- Other name: Date Pro (伊達プロ)
- Education: Ritsumeikan University
- Occupation: Voice actress. professional mahjong player
- Years active: 2013–present
- Website: https://datearisa.com/

Arisa Date (伊達 朱里紗, Date Arisa; born May 10, 1991) is a Japanese voice actress and professional mahjong player. She was previously affiliated with 81 Produce. She is known for her roles as Yui Yumekawa in Idol Time PriPara.

== Biography ==
Arisa Date was born on May 10, 1991, in Hyogo Prefecture, Japan. She lived there until the first year of junior high school. She then moved to Osaka during her second year of junior high and lived there until her third year in high school.

After she graduated from high school, Date enrolled in Ritsumeikan University studying image arts and sciences. It was later revealed that voice actress Naomi Ōzora also studied in the same field.

In 2014 Date voiced a minor character in Saki: The Nationals which features riichi mahjong. She became addicted to playing riichi mahjong after this role. In April 2019, she announced that she became a professional mahjong player affiliated with the Japan Professional Mahjong League. In 2021, Date won her first Japan Professional Mahjong League Title by placing 1st in the 1st Sakura Bud Fight for young female professionals of the league. In August 2021, she was drafted by the Konami Mahjong Fight Club professional mahjong team to participate in the team riichi mahjong tournament M-League.

Her hobbies/skills are drawing with aquarelle pencils, watching live performances, mahjong, Adobe Photoshop, and Adobe Illustrator. Her favorite artists include Yukari Tamura, Nana Mizuki, Kana Hanazawa and Saori Hayami. She likes tomato sauce pasta, but dislikes tomatoes, celery, and unagi.

== Filmography ==
=== Television animation ===
2013

- Duel Masters Victory V3

2014

- Aikatsu! (Fan)
- Saki: The Nationals (Suzu Ueshige)
- No-Rin (Girl)
- Pokémon XY (Maid, Karen)
- Shounen Hollywood (Girl)

2015

- The Idolmaster Cinderella Girls (Emi Namba)
- PriPara (Girl)
- Rin-ne (Yumi)
- Punch Line (Rumi)
- Venus Project: Climax (Isami Kawato)

2016

- Haruchika (Chiyoko Katagiri, Kanoko Degawa)

2017

- Little Witch Academia (Maril Cavendish)
- Idol Time PriPara (Yui Yumekawa)

2018

- Wotakoi: Love is Hard for Otaku (Narumi Momose)
- The Master of Ragnarok & Blesser of Einherjar (Sigrun)

2020

- Kiratto Pri Chan (Yui Gekikawa)

2022

- World's End Harem (Rikka Yanagi)

=== Video games ===
2022

- Azur Lane (Hai Tien, Hai Chi)

2023

- Honkai: Star Rail (Qingque)
