= List of Kiratto Pri Chan episodes =

- No. of episodes: 153

Release
- Original network: TV Tokyo
- Original release: April 8, 2018 – May 30, 2021

Season chronology
- ← Previous; Idol Time PriPara Next → Waccha PriMagi!

The following is a list of episodes of the Kiratto Pri☆Chan anime television series. The opening and ending themes for season 1 are "Kiratto Start" and "Pretty☆Channel" for episodes 1–26, "Go! Up! Stardom!" and "KIRA KIRA Hologram" for episodes 27–39, and "never-ending!!" and "SHINING FLOWER" for episodes 40–51. The opening and ending themes for season 2 are "Diamond Smile" and "Rock Paper Scissors Kiratto! Pri☆Chan" for episodes 52–77 and "Kiralist Jewelist" and "Brand New Girls" for episodes 78–102. The opening and ending themes for season 3 are "Illuminage Land" and "A・B・C・D・Nice★Dance" for episodes 103–128, "Luminance Princess" for episodes 129–141, and "Dreaming☆Channel" and "One Heart" for episodes 142–152. All season one episode titles end with "Yattemita", while "~damon" is used for season two episode titles. In season three, the episode titles ended with a sentence-ender of a mascot, some of which include "~cchu", "~pan", and "~rabbi".

== Episode list ==
=== Season 1 (2018-19) ===
No.	Title	Original release date
1	"We Tried Kiratto Pri☆Chan!"; Transliteration: "Kiratto Puri☆Chan Yattemita!" (Japanese: キラッとプリ☆チャンやってみた！)	April 8, 2018
2	"We Tried A Pri☆Chan Flower Shop!"; Transliteration: "Furawā Shoppu de Puri☆Chan Yattemita!" (Japanese: フラワーショップでプリ☆チャンやってみた！)	April 15, 2018
3	"We Tried Creating an Idol Song!"; Transliteration: "Aidoru Songu Tsukuttemita!" (Japanese: アイドルソングつくってみた！)	April 22, 2018
4	"We Tried to Appeal With Sweets!"; Transliteration: "Suītsu o Apīru Shitemita!" (Japanese: スイーツをアピールしてみた！)	April 29, 2018
5	"We Tried Heating Up With Guts!"; Transliteration: "Gattsu de Atsuku Nattemita!" (Japanese: ガッツでアツくなってみた！)	May 6, 2018
6	"We Tried Sending Our Cheers!"; Transliteration: "Ēru, Okuttemita!" (Japanese: エール、送ってみた！)	May 13, 2018
7	"We Tried Making a Cat Video!"; Transliteration: "Neko Dōga o Tottemita!" (Japanese: ねこ動画を撮ってみた！)	May 20, 2018
8	"We Tried Becoming Fashionable With Our Hairstyles & Makeup!"; Transliteration: "Hea ando Meiku de Oshare Shitemita!" (Japanese: ヘア&メイクでおしゃれしてみた！)	May 27, 2018
9	"I, Myself, Have Tried Challenging You!"; Transliteration: "Watakushi, Charenji Shitemimashitawa!" (Japanese: ワタクシ、チャレンジしてみましたわ！)	June 3, 2018
10	"We Tried Dating Our Rivals!"; Transliteration: "Raibaru to Dēto Shitemita!" (Japanese: ライバルとデートしてみた！)	June 10, 2018
11	"We Tried Participating In Our First Special Competition!"; Transliteration: "Hajimete Supesharu Yattemita!" (Japanese: はじめてスペシャルやってみた！)	June 17, 2018
12	"We Tried Burning Our Hearts!"; Transliteration: "Hāto o Moya Shitemita!" (Japanese: ハートを燃やしてみた！)	June 24, 2018
13	"Mirai Momoyama, Tried to Fly!"; Transliteration: "Momoyama Mirai ga, Tondemita!" (Japanese: 桃山みらいが、とんでみた！)	July 1, 2018
14	"We Tried To Excite Our Fans Too!"; Transliteration: "Fan Datte Moriagattemita!" (Japanese: ファンだって盛りあがってみた！)	July 8, 2018
15	"Rinka Tried It!"; Transliteration: "Rinka, Yattemita!" (Japanese: りんか、やってみた！)	July 15, 2018
16	"I Tried Breaking Through The Confusion In My Heart!"; Transliteration: "Kokoro no Mayoi o Nuketemita!" (Japanese: 心の迷いを抜けてみた！)	July 22, 2018
17	"I Tried To Say Goodbye With A Smile!"; Transliteration: "Egao de Sayonara Shitemita!" (Japanese: 笑顔でさよならしてみた！)	July 29, 2018
18	"We Tried A Summer Special!"; Transliteration: "Samā na Supesharu Yattemita!" (Japanese: サマーなスペシャルやってみた！)	August 5, 2018
19	"It's Summer! It's The Beach! We Went There!"; Transliteration: "Natsu da! Bīchi da! Ittemita!" (Japanese: 夏だ！ビーチだ！行ってみた！)	August 12, 2018
20	"Yahoo! We Tried Mountain Climbing!"; Transliteration: "Yahhō! Yama no Bottemita!" (Japanese: ヤッホー！山のぼってみた！)	August 19, 2018
21	"I Tried It At The Summer Festival!"; Transliteration: "Manatsu no Fesu de Yattemita!" (Japanese: 真夏のフェスでやってみた！)	August 26, 2018
22	"I Have Tried Flying With Dolphins!"; Transliteration: "Watakushi, Iruka to Tondemimashitawa!" (Japanese: わたくし、イルカと翔んでみましたわ！)	September 2, 2018
23	"We Tried Meeting Mel-Mel!"; Transliteration: "Merumeru to Deattemita!" (Japanese: めるめると出会ってみた！)	September 9, 2018
24	"I Tried Wishing On A Star!"; Transliteration: "Hoshi no Negai o Kanaetemita!" (Japanese: 星の願いをかなえてみた！)	September 16, 2018
25	"Mel Tried Being a Detective!"; Transliteration: "Meru ga Tantei Yattemita!" (Japanese: めるが探偵やってみた！)	September 23, 2018
26	"There are Some Strange Pranks Began!"; Transliteration: "Okashi na Itazura Yattemita!" (Japanese: おかしなイタズラやってみた！)	September 30, 2018
27	"Fighting with Smile!"; Transliteration: "Egao de Kimetemimashitawa!" (Japanese: 笑顔で決めてみましたわ！)	October 7, 2018
28	"Attend to the Celebrity Party!"; Transliteration: "Serebu na Pāti Ittemita!" (Japanese: セレブなパーティ行ってみた！)	October 14, 2018
29	"Search for the Sparkling Things!"; Transliteration: "Kirakira, Sagashitemita!" (Japanese: キラキラ、さがしてみた！)	October 21, 2018
30	"Excuse me for Halloween!"; Transliteration: "Ojama Harowin Yattemita!" (Japanese: おジャマハロウィンやってみた！)	October 28, 2018
31	"Visit the Manga Production Scene!"; Transliteration: "Manga no Genba Ittemita!" (Japanese: マンガの現場いってみた！)	November 4, 2018
32	"Tracking Interesting Rumors!"; Transliteration: "Kininaru Uwasa Ottemita!" (Japanese: 気になるウワサ追ってみた！)	November 11, 2018
33	"Sara-Chan Loves Fluffy Things!"; Transliteration: "Sara-chan ga Mofumofu Shitemita!" (Japanese: さらちゃんがモフモフしてみた！)	November 18, 2018
34	"We are Going to Dissolve!"; Transliteration: "Oretachi Kaisan Shitemita!" (Japanese: 俺たち解散してみた！)	November 25, 2018
35	"Friendship Across Time and Space!"; Transliteration: "Yūjō, Toki o Koetemita!" (Japanese: 友情、時をこえてみた！)	December 2, 2018
36	"Work Towards 100 Points!"; Transliteration: "Hyakuten Mezashitemimashita wa!" (Japanese: 100点めざしてみましたわ！)	December 9, 2018
37	"The Winter Special is Opening!"; Transliteration: "Uintā na Supesharu Yattemita!" (Japanese: ウィンターなスペシャルやってみた！)	December 16, 2018
38	"Miss Aira Debuts too!" Transliteration: "Aira-san to Yattemita!" (Japanese: あいらさんとやってみた！)	December 23, 2018
39	"Going to Anju's Island!"; Transliteration: "Anju no Shima ni Ittemita!" (Japanese: アンジュの島にいってみた！)	January 6, 2019
40	"Stay Overnight at Sarara's Home!"; Transliteration: "Sarara no Ie ni Tomattemita!" (Japanese: さららの家に泊ってみた！)	January 13, 2019
41	"All-out Support for Shunta's Dating!"; Transliteration: "Shunta no Dēto Ōen Shitemita!" (Japanese: 春太のデート応援してみた！)	January 20, 2019
42	"Rinka? Is Being the Rinka!?"; Transliteration: "Rinka? Ga Rinka Yattemita!?" (Japanese: りんか？がりんかやってみた！？)	January 27, 2019
43	"Try to Make Chocolate!"; Transliteration: "Choko Tsukuttemita!" (Japanese: チョコ作ってみた！)	February 3, 2019
44	"Helping for the Fashion Show!"; Transliteration: "Fasshon Shō Tetsudattemita!" (Japanese: ファッションショー手伝ってみた！)	February 10, 2019
45	"Listen to Miss Anju's Heart!"; Transliteration: "Anju-san no Honne Kītemita!" (Japanese: アンジュさんのホンネ聞いてみた！)	February 17, 2019
46	"Deliver Everyone's Thoughts!"; Transliteration: "Minna no Omoi o Todoketemita!" (Japanese: みんなの想いを届けてみた！)	February 24, 2019
47	"Do it Because I Don't Know!"; Transliteration: ""Wakaranai" Kara Yattemita!" (Japanese: 「わからない」からやってみた！)	March 3, 2019
48	"A Decisive Victory or Defeat!"; Transliteration: "Ketchaku Tsuketemimashitawa!" (Japanese: 決着 つけてみましたわ！)	March 10, 2019
49	"Searching, Searching, and Searching!"; Transliteration: "Sagashite, Sagashite, Sagashitemita!" (Japanese: さがして、さがして、さがしてみた！)	March 17, 2019
50	"We Tried Dream Pri Chan!"; Transliteration: "Yume no Puri☆Chan, Yattemita!" (Japanese: 夢のプリ☆チャン、やってみた！)	March 24, 2019
51	"Shining Farewell!"; Transliteration: "Kiratto Owakare, Yattemita!" (Japanese: キラッとお別れ、やってみた！)	March 31, 2019

=== Season 2 (2019-20) ===
No. overall	No. in season	Title	Original release date
52	1	"Heart-Pounding! So Exciting! The Jewel Audition is Opening!"; Transliteration: "Dokidoki! Wakuwaku! Jueru Ōdishon Kaimaku damon!" (Japanese: ドキドキ！わくわく！ジュエルオーディション開幕だもん！)	April 7, 2019
53	2	"Maria is Coming! The Lovely Promotion Committee!"; Transliteration: "Maria-chan ga Yattekita! Kawaii Kōjō Iinkai damon!" (Japanese: まりあちゃんがやって来た！かわいい向上委員会だもん！)	April 14, 2019
54	3	"The Jewel Chance? Mirai is Trying to Challenge!"; Transliteration: "Jueru Chansu? Mirai ga Charenji damon!" (Japanese: ジュエルチャンス？ みらいがチャレンジだもん！)	April 21, 2019
55	4	"Kiratto Heart-Pounding! This is the Jewel Code!"; Transliteration: "Kiratto Tokimeki! Kore ga Jueru Kōde damon!" (Japanese: キラッとときめき！これがジュエルコーデだもん！)	April 28, 2019
56	5	"Maria is Declared! Cute saves the World!"; Transliteration: "Maria ga Sengen! Kawaii wa Sekai o Sukūn damon!" (Japanese: まりあが宣言！かわいいは世界を救うんだもん！)	May 5, 2019
57	6	"Maria! Suzu! The Pair's First Program!"; Transliteration: "Maria-chan! Suzu-chan! Futari de Hajimete no Bangumi damon!" (Japanese: まりあちゃん！すずちゃん！2人で初めての番組だもん！)	May 12, 2019
58	7	"Meganee in Big Trouble! Rinka is Going to be a One Day Manager!"; Transliteration: "Meganee Dai Pinchi! Rinka-chan ga Ichinichi Tenchō Nan damon!" (Japanese: めが姉ぇ大ピンチ！りんかちゃんが1日店長なんだもん！)	May 19, 2019
59	8	"Lots of Picture Books! The Fashionable Book Cafe is Opening!"; Transliteration: "Ehon ga Ippai! Oshare Bukku Kafe Hajimemashita damon!" (Japanese: 絵本がいっぱい！おしゃれブックカフェはじめました だもん！)	May 26, 2019
60	9	"Wonderful Fun! The Design Palette!"; Transliteration: "Suteki ni Tanoshiku! Dezain Paretto damon!" (Japanese: ステキに楽しく！デザインパレットだもん！)	June 2, 2019
61	10	"Shockingly! The Meltic Star is Coming Back?"; Transliteration: "Bikkuri Dokkiri! Merutikku Sutā ga Kaettekuru? damon!" (Japanese: ビックリドッキリ！メルティックスターが帰ってくる？だもん！)	June 9, 2019
62	11	"Maria and Suzu! Say Hello to Meltic Star!"; Transliteration: "Maria to Suzu! Merutikku Sutā to Konnichiwa damon!" (Japanese: まりあとすず！メルティックスターとこんにちはだもん！)	June 16, 2019
63	12	"Happy Training Camp with Mel!"; Transliteration: "Meru-chan to! Nakayoshi Gasshuku shitemitan damon!" (Japanese: めるちゃんと！仲良し合宿してみたんだもん！)	June 23, 2019
64	13	"The Dia Festival! The Brilliant Things is Coming Soon!"; Transliteration: "Daia Fesu! Iyoiyo Karatto Hajimarun damon!" (Japanese: だいあフェス！いよいよカラッとはじまるんだもん！)	June 30, 2019
65	14	"Suzu is Trying to Handsome Appearance!"; Transliteration: "Suzu ga Kakkoyoku Kimetemita! Damon!" (Japanese: すずがカッコよくきめてみた！だもん！)	July 7, 2019
66	15	"The Design Palette! Help you Become Fashionable!"; Transliteration: "Dezain Paretto! Oshare wa Omakase damon!" (Japanese: デザインパレット！おしゃれはおまかせだもん！)	July 14, 2019
67	16	"Maria and Suzu! The Group is Formed at Last!?"; Transliteration: "Maria to Suzu! Tsuini Gurūpu Kessei!? Damon!" (Japanese: まりあとすず！ついにグループ結成！？だもん！)	July 21, 2019
68	17	"Goodbye, Suzu and Maria's Farewell with Smile!"; Transliteration: "Sayonara, Suzu Maria Egao no Owakare! Damon!" (Japanese: さよなら、すず まりあ笑顔のお別れ！だもん！)	July 28, 2019
Note: This episode will feature a crossover television special with Secret × Heroine Phantomirage!
69	18	"Departure Alright! The Miracle ☆ Kirats One Day Station Manager!"; Transliteration: "Hassha Ōrai! Mirakuru ☆ Kirattsu Ichinichi Ekichō damon!" (Japanese: 発車オーライ！ミラクル☆キラッツ一日駅長だもん！)	August 4, 2019
70	19	"The Summer Dia Festival! The Hit Parade is Wonderful!"; Transliteration: "Natsu no Daia Fesu! Hitto Parēdo de Atsuin damon!" (Japanese: 夏のだいあフェス！ヒットパレードで熱いんだもん！)	August 11, 2019
71	20	"Sing, Emo-chan! There Must be Some Way!"; Transliteration: "Utae, Emo-chan! Nanto ka Narunaru! damon!" (Japanese: 歌え えもちゃん！なんとかなるなる！だもん！)	August 18, 2019
72	21	"Seaside Special Training! Go on Suzu-chan!"; Transliteration: "Umi de Tokkun! Ganbare Suzu-chan! damon!" (Japanese: 海で特訓！がんばれすずちゃん！だもん！)	August 25, 2019
73	22	"Sara-chan's Worry... Get over the Slump!"; Transliteration: "Sara-chan Nayamu... Suranpu o Norikoero! damon" (Japanese: さらちゃん悩む…スランプを乗り越えろ！だもん)	September 1, 2019
74	23	"Everyone Become Fashionable! The Design Palette"; Transliteration: "Mīnna Oshare! Dezain Paretto damon" (Japanese: みーんなオシャレ！デザインパレットだもん)	September 8, 2019
75	24	"Happy Together! Meganee and Me!"; Transliteration: "Issho ni Hapi naru! Meganee-san to Watashi! Damon" (Japanese: いっしょにハピなる！めが姉ぇさんと私！だもん)	September 15, 2019
76	25	"Shining Hello! Daia and Daia Encounter in that Day!"; Transliteration: "Kiranichiwa! Daia to Daia ga Deatta Hi, damon!" (Japanese: キラにちは！だいあとだいあが出会った日、だもん！)	September 22, 2019
77	26	"The Mysterious Idol is Finally Debut!"; Transliteration: "Nazo no Aidoru Tsuini Debyū! Damon!" (Japanese: ナゾのアイドル ついにデビュー！だもん！)	September 29, 2019
78	27	"A Great Disturbance in Kirajuku!? The Phoenix Mask Appears?"; Transliteration: "Kirajuku Daisōdō!? Fenikkusu Kamen Arawaru? Damon!" (Japanese: キラ宿大騒動！？フェニックス仮面あらわる？だもん！)	October 6, 2019
79	28	"Suddenly Open!? The Phoenix Cup!"; Transliteration: "Ikinari Kaisai!? Fenikkusu Hai damon!" (Japanese: いきなり開催！？フェニックス杯だもん！)	October 13, 2019
80	29	"So Exciting! Miss Anju's Masquerade!"; Transliteration: "Wakuwaku! Anju-san no Kamen Butōkai damon!" (Japanese: わくわく！アンジュさんの仮面舞踏会だもん！)	October 20, 2019
81	30	"Dissolution at Last? The Oshama Tricks!"; Transliteration: "Tōtō Kaisan? Oshama Torikkusu damon!" (Japanese: とうとう解散？おしゃまトリックスだもん！)	October 27, 2019
82	31	"The Last Dia Festival! The Handsome Duel!"; Transliteration: "Saigo no Daia Fesu! Kakkoī Taiketsu damon!" (Japanese: 最後のだいあフェス！カッコいい対決だもん！)	November 3, 2019
83	32	"Magic Experience of Magic Bookstore!"; Transliteration: "Fushigi na Honya-san de Fushigi Taiken damon!" (Japanese: ふしぎな本屋さんでふしぎ体験だもん！)	November 10, 2019
84	33	"The Rocket Heart! Deliver into Space!"; Transliteration: "Roketto Hāto! Uchū ni Todoke! Damon!" (Japanese: ロケットハート！宇宙に届け！だもん！)	November 17, 2019
85	34	"Fight, Suzu-chan! Take Back Cool Brother!"; Transliteration: "Suzu-chan Faito! Kakkoī Onī-chan o Torimodose! Damon!" (Japanese: すずちゃんファイト！かっこいいお兄ちゃんを取り戻せ！だもん！)	November 24, 2019
86	35	"Perfect! My Acquisition Plan of Jewel Code!"; Transliteration: "Kanpeki! Watakushi no Jueru Kōde Kakutoku Keikaku desuwa! Damon!" (Japanese: カンペキ！わたくしのジュエルコーデ獲得計画ですわ！だもん！)	December 1, 2019
87	36	"Anna-chan and Emo-chan, Under one Roof?"; Transliteration: "Anna-chan Emo-chan, Hitotsu Yane no Shita? Damon!" (Japanese: あんなちゃんえもちゃん、一つ屋根の下？だもん！)	December 8, 2019
88	37	"Anna and Emo! The Reconciliation Survival!"; Transliteration: "Anna to Emo! Nakanaori Sabaibaru! Damon!" (Japanese: あんなとえも！仲なおりサバイバル！だもん！)	December 15, 2019
89	38	"The Holy Night for Everyone! The Shining Jewel Christmas!"; Transliteration: "Seiya wa Minna de! Jueru Kagayaku Kurisumasu! Damon!" (Japanese: 聖夜はみんなで！ジュエルかがやくクリスマス！だもん！)	December 22, 2019
90	39	"A Big Announcement! This Is the Diamond Coord!"; Transliteration: "Dai Happyō! Kore ga Daiyamondo Kōde! Damon!" (Japanese: 大発表！これがダイヤモンドコーデ！だもん！)	December 29, 2019
91	40	"Naru the Manager! I'm Worried About Everyone's Dreams!"; Transliteration: "Naru tenchō! Min'na no yume ga ki ni naru naru! Damon!" (Japanese: なる店長！みんなの夢が気になるなる！だもん！)	January 12, 2020
92	41	"The Great Adventure! Kiranichiwa to Daia's World!"; Transliteration: "Dai bōken! Daia no sekai ni kiranichiwa! Damon!" (Japanese: 大冒険！だいあの世界にキラにちは！だもん！)	January 19, 2020
93	42	"A Change of Image? Daia's Mysterious Transformation!"; Transliteration: "Imēji Chenji!? Daia ga nazo no daihenshin! Dayon!" (Japanese: イメージチェンジ!?だいあがなぞの大変身！だよん！)	January 26, 2020
94	43	"Maria's Big Shock!? Suzu's a Rival!"; Transliteration: "Maria daishokku!? Suzu wa raibaruna ndayon!" (Japanese: まりあ大ショック!?すずはライバルなんだよん！)	February 2, 2020
95	44	"Daia Intrudes? The Search for Kiratts' Secrets!"; Transliteration: "Daia ga ojama? Kirattsu no himitsu wo saguru ndayon!" (Japanese: だいあがおジャマ？キラッツの秘密を探るんだよん！)	February 9, 2020
96	45	"Excitingly Heart-Racing! Jewel Collection Coming Soon!"; Transliteration: "Dokiwaku! Mōsugu jueru korekushon! Dayon!" (Japanese: ドキワク！もうすぐジュエルコレクション！だよん！)	February 16, 2020
97	46	"Finally, the Opening! The Jewel Collection!"; Transliteration: "Tsuini kaimaku! Jueru korekushon! Dayon!" (Japanese: ついに開幕！ジュエルコレクション！だよん！)	February 23, 2020
98	47	"Still, the Continuation! The Jewel Collection!!"; Transliteration: "Madamada tsuzuku yo! Jueru korekushon!! Dayon!" (Japanese: まだまだ続くよ！ジュエルコレクション!!だよん！)	March 1, 2020
99	48	"Finally, the Conclusion! The Jewel Collection!!!!"; Transliteration: "Iyoiyo kecchaku! Jueru korekushon!!! Dayon!" (Japanese: いよいよ決着！ジュエルコレクション!!!だよん！)	March 8, 2020
100	49	"Please, Diamond Coord! Deliver our feelings!" Transliteration: "Onegai, daiyamondokōde! Todoke, watashitachi no omoi!" (Japanese: お願い、ダイヤモンドコーデ！届け、私たちの思い！)	March 15, 2020
101	50	"Daia Protects! Everyone's Pri☆Chan!"; Transliteration: "Daia ga mamoru! Minna no Puri☆Chan! Damon!" (Japanese: だいあが守る！みんなのプリ☆チャン！だもん！)	March 22, 2020
102	51	"Connected with Sparkles! This is Pri☆Chan!"; Transliteration: "Kiratto tsunagaru! Sore ga Puri☆Chan! Damon!" (Japanese: キラッとつながる！それがプリ☆チャン だもん！)	March 29, 2020

=== Season 3 (2020-21) ===
No. overall	No. in season	Title	Original release date
103	1	"A Sparkling Opening! Pri☆Chan Land Has Arrived!"; Transliteration: "Kiratto ōpun! Puri☆Chan Rando ga yattekita cchu!" (Japanese: キラッとオープン！プリ☆チャンランドがやってきたッチュ！)	April 5, 2020
104	2	"Panpakapan! Melpan's Here!"; Transliteration: "Panpakapān! Merupan tōjōda pan!" (Japanese: パンカパーン！メルパン登場だパン！)	April 12, 2020
105	3	"Where, Where? GOGO, Search for PriTama!"; Transliteration: "Doko doko? PuriTama sagashi ni GOGO cchu!" (Japanese: どこどこ？プリたまさがしにGOGOッチュ！)	April 19, 2020
106	4	"Shine! The Rainbow Princess Cup!"; Transliteration: "Kagayake! Reinbo Purinsesu Kapu da cchu!" (Japanese: かがやけ！レインボープリンセスカップだッチュ！)	April 26, 2020
107	5	"KiracCHU, Desires to be an Idol!"; Transliteration: "KiracCHU, aidoru ni naritai cchu!" (Japanese: キラッCHU、アイドルになりたいッチュ！)	July 5, 2020
108	6	"KiracCHU, Want to have a Live!"; Transliteration: "KiracCHU, raibu ga shitai cchu!" (Japanese: キラッCHU、ライブがしたいッチュ！)	July 12, 2020
109	7	"A Complete Solution? The Great Reconciliation Operation!"; Transliteration: "Marutto Kaiketsu? Nakanaori Daisakusen cchu! pan!" (Japanese: まるっと解決？仲直り大作戦ッチュ！パン！)	July 19, 2020
110	8	"Echoing! The Melody Princess Cup!"; Transliteration: "Hibike! Merodī Purinsesu Kappu da pan!" (Japanese: ひびけ！メロディープリンセスカップだパン！)	July 26, 2020
111	9	"Melpan, Can't be an Idol!"; Transliteration: "Merupan, Aidoru Dekinai pan!" (Japanese: メルパン、アイドルできないパン！)	August 2, 2020
112	10	"Aim to be Passing! The Mascot Certification Test!"; Transliteration: "Mezase Gōkaku! Masukotto Nintei Shiken da cchu!" (Japanese: めざせ合格！マスコット認定試験だッチュ！)	August 9, 2020
113	11	"Click! The Smile Photo Opportunity!"; Transliteration: "Pashari! Egao no Shattā Chansu da cchu!" (Japanese: パシャリ！笑顔のシャッターチャンスだッチュ！)	August 16, 2020
114	12	"Take Care of Yourself! Pritama GO!"; Transliteration: "Osewa wa Omakase! Puritama Gō da cchu!" (Japanese: お世話はおまかせ！プリたまGOだッチュ！)	August 23, 2020
115	13	"Ring Marry is Back!"; Transliteration: "Ringu Marii ga Kaettekita rabi!" (Japanese: リングマリィが帰ってきたラビ！)	August 30, 2020
116	14	"Happy Lovely Wedding!"; Transliteration: "Happī Raburii Wedingu rabi!" (Japanese: ハッピーラブリィウェディングラビ！)	September 6, 2020
117	15	"Happy Birthday! Emo's Friendship Present!"; Transliteration: "Happī Bāsudē! Emo-chan Yūjō no Purezento da cchu!" (Japanese: ハッピーバースデー！えもちゃん友情のプレゼントだッチュ！)	September 13, 2020
118	16	"Sparkling Gathering! The Pretty All Friends!"; Transliteration: "Kiratto Atsumare! Puritī Ōru Furenzu da cchu!" (Japanese: キラッとあつまれ！プリティーオールフレンズだッチュ！)	September 20, 2020
119	17	"Eve is Lost!? The Mermaid Princess Cup!"; Transliteration: "Maigo no Ibu!? Māmeido Purinsesu Kappu rabi!" (Japanese: 迷子のイブ！？マーメイドプリンセスカップラビ！)	September 27, 2020
120	18	"Big Shock! Rabbily's Real Master!?"; Transliteration: "Dai Shokku! Rabirii no Hontō no Goshujin-sama rabi!?" (Japanese: 大ショック！ラビリィの本当のご主人様ラビ！？)	October 4, 2020
121	19	"KiracCHU is Failure!? The Mascot Certification Test!"; Transliteration: "KiracCHU Rakudai cchu!? Masukotto Nintei Shiken cchu!" (Japanese: キラッCHU落第ッチュ！？マスコット認定試験ッチュ！)	October 11, 2020
122	20	"Super Cute Idol!? The Rice Area's Tente Old Rice!"; Transliteration: "Geki Kawa Aidoru!? Raisu Eria de Tente Ko Mai cchu!" (Japanese: 激かわアイドル！？ライスエリアでてんてこ米ッチュ！)	October 18, 2020
123	21	"Fight Oshama!? Saving Bugchu!"; Transliteration: "Oshama Ganbaru!? Bagutchu o Tasukeru cchu!" (Japanese: おしゃま頑張る！？バグッチュを助けるッチュ！)	October 25, 2020
124	22	"The Masters are in Big Trouble!? GO! GO! Mascots!"; Transliteration: "Goshujin-sama Dai Pinchi!? Gō! Gō! Masukottsu da cchu!" (Japanese: ご主人様大ピンチ！？GO！GO！マスコッツだッチュ！)	November 1, 2020
125	23	"Warming! Everyone's Family Day!"; Transliteration: "Hokkahoka! Minna no Famirī Dē da cchu!" (Japanese: ほっかほか！みんなのファミリーデーだッチュ！)	November 8, 2020
126	24	"Alice! The Smile Solo Debut!"; Transliteration: "Arisu! Egao no Soro Debyū!" (Japanese: アリス！ 笑顔のソロデビュー！)	November 15, 2020
127	25	"Fly! Alice! The Sunshine Princess Cup!"; Transliteration: "Tobe! Arisu! Sanshain Purinsesu Kappu!" (Japanese: とべ！アリス！サンシャインプリンセスカップ！)	November 22, 2020
128	26	"Protect Alice! The Miracle in the Sunshine Circus Area!"; Transliteration: "Arisu o Mamore! Sanshain Sākasu Eria no Kiseki!" (Japanese: アリスを守れ！サンシャインサーカスエリアの奇跡！)	November 29, 2020
129	27	"The Company Inspection! This is Kagayaki Corporation!"; Transliteration: "Kaisha Kengaku! Kore ga Kagayaki Kōporēshon da cchu!" (Japanese: 会社見学！これがカガヤキ・コーポレーションだッチュ！)	December 6, 2020
130	28	"The Coin Shopping! The Mascot Shopping Confrontation!"; Transliteration: "Koin Shoppingu! Masukotto Okaimono Taiketsu rabi!" (Japanese: コインショッピング！ マスコットお買い物対決ラビ！)	December 13, 2020
131	29	"The Certification Test is Failure! Go Back to the Egg!"; Transliteration: "Nintei Shiken Fugōkaku! Tamago ni Modotchau cchu!" (Japanese: 認定試験不合格！たまごに戻っちゃうッチュ！)	December 20, 2020
132	30	"The Oshama Tricks! Finally Live Debut!?"; Transliteration: "Oshama Torikkusu! Tsui ni Raibu Debyū!? Cchu!" (Japanese: おしゃまトリックス！ ついにライブデビュー！？ッチュ！)	December 27, 2020
133	31	"The Very Special Open! The Virtual Pri☆Chan Land!"; Transliteration: "Tokubetsu Ōpun! Bācharu Puri☆Chan Rando! Damon!" (Japanese: 特別オープン！バーチャルプリ☆チャンランド！だもん！)	January 10, 2021
134	32	"Eve Shining! The Moonlight Magic Area!"; Transliteration: "Ibu-chan Kagayaku! Mūnraito Majikku Eria da cchu!" (Japanese: イブちゃん輝く！ムーンライトマジックエリアだッチュ！)	January 17, 2021
135	33	"Shine! The Moonlight Princess Cup!"; Transliteration: "Kagayake! Mūnraito Purinsesu Kappu da cchu!" (Japanese: 輝け！ムーンライトプリンセスカップだッチュ！)	January 24, 2021
136	34	"Luluna and Eve, Memories of Pri☆Chan Land!"; Transliteration: "Ruruna to Ibu, Omoide no Puri☆Chan Rando da cchu!" (Japanese: ルルナとイブ、思い出のプリ☆チャンランドだッチュ！)	January 31, 2021
137	35	"Save Eve! Pri☆Chan Fantasy!"; Transliteration: "Ibu o Sukue! Puri☆Chan Fantajī da cchu!" (Japanese: イブを救え！プリ☆チャンファンタジーだッチュ！)	February 7, 2021
138	36	"Eve Laugh! The Winter Resort!"; Transliteration: "Ibu-chan Waratte! Wintā Rizōto da cchu!" (Japanese: イブちゃん笑って！ウィンターリゾートだッチュ！)	February 14, 2021
139	37	""You Are the Star!" The Shop Manager Has Arrived!"; Transliteration: ""Kimi Koso Sutā da!" Naru Tenchō ga Yatte Kita cchu!" (Japanese: 「君こそスターだ！」 なる店長がやって来たッチュ！)	February 21, 2021
140	38	"Infiltration! Pri☆Chan Land Big Adventure!"; Transliteration: "Sen'nyū! Puri☆Chan Rando de Dai Bōken da cchu!" (Japanese: 潜入！プリ☆チャンランドで大冒険だッチュ！)	February 28, 2021
141	39	"The Live of Destiny Alice and Eve!"; Transliteration: "Unmei no Raibu Arisu to Ibu!" (Japanese: 運命のライブ アリスとイブ！)	March 7, 2021
142	40	"Replace It! Eve, Start the Shop!"; Transliteration: "Torikaekko! Ibu-chan, O-mise Hajimeru cchu!" (Japanese: とりかえっこ！イブちゃん、お店はじめるッチュ！)	March 14, 2021
143	41	"Image Change Sara-sama Heart Pounding Fluffy Bread!"; Transliteration: "Imechen Sara-sama Dokidoki Fuwafuwa da Pan!" (Japanese: イメチェンさら様 ドキドキふわふわだパン！)	March 21, 2021
144	42	"Great Expectations! Who is the Princess!"; Transliteration: "Dai Yosō! Purinsesu wa Dareda cchu!" (Japanese: 大予想！ プリンセスは誰だッチュ！)	March 28, 2021
145	43	"Kashi Kuma! The Rice Area is in a Big Crisis!?"; Transliteration: "Kashi Kuma! Raisu Eria ga Dai Pinchi!?" (Japanese: かしくま！ ライスエリアが大ピンチ！？)	April 4, 2021
146	44	"Goodbye! Mel-sama Bread Goes Into Space?!"; Transliteration: "Gubbai! Meru-sama Uchū ni Itchau Pan?!" (Japanese: グッバイ！める様宇宙にいっちゃうパン？！)	April 11, 2021
147	45	"Pri☆Chan Cinema Paradise!"; Transliteration: "Puri☆Chan Shinema Paradaisu da cchu!" (Japanese: プリ☆チャンシネマパラダイスだッチュ！)	April 18, 2021
148	46	"Finally Held! Queen's Grand Prix!"; Transliteration: "Tsui ni Kaisai! Kuīnzu Guran Puri da cchu!" (Japanese: ついに開催！クイーンズ・グランプリだッチュ！)	April 25, 2021
149	47	"Finally Settled! Queen's Grand Prix!"; Transliteration: "Iyoiyo Ketchaku! Kuīnzu Guran Puri da cchu!" (Japanese: いよいよ決着！クイーンズ・グランプリだッチュ！)	May 2, 2021
150	48	"Luluna is Back! A New Pri☆Chan Rule!?"; Transliteration: "Ruruna Fukkatsu! Atarashii Puri☆Chan Rūru cchu!?" (Japanese: ルルナ復活！新しいプリ☆チャンルールッチュ！？)	May 9, 2021
151	49	"Illuminage Queen! Mascot Miracle!"; Transliteration: "Irumināju Kuīn! Masukotto no Kiseki cchu!" (Japanese: イルミナージュクイーン！マスコットの奇跡ッチュ！)	May 16, 2021
152	50	"Everyone Gather! Protect the Future of Pri☆Chan!"; Transliteration: "Minna Atsumare! Mirai no Puri☆Chan Mamoru cchu!" (Japanese: みんな集まれ！未来のプリ☆チャン守るッチュ！)	May 23, 2021
153	51	"Let's Try Kiratto Pri☆Chan!"; Transliteration: "Kiratto Puri☆Chan Yattemiyō!" (Japanese: キラッとプリ☆チャンやってみよう！)	May 30, 2021
