= Cheeky Parade =

Japanese girl group

- Also known as: Chikipa
- Origin: Japan
- Genres: J-pop
- Years active: 2012–2018
- Labels: iDOL Street
- Members: Asami Watanabe; Yūna Sekine; Rino Shimazaki; Yuriya Suzuki; Marin Yamamoto; Hina Nagai; Mariya Suzuki
- Past members: Seran Mizorogi; Momoka Kodakari
- Website: www.cheekyparade.jp

Cheeky Parade (チィキィ パレード), also known as Chikipa (チキパ) was a Japanese girl group formed by Avex Trax in 2011.

== History ==
Formed in 2012, Cheeky Parade is one of Japan's rising girl idol groups. Their unique style fuses Japanese Idol music with the seemingly limitless energy of the 9 girls that make up Cheeky Parade. The group's name fittingly represents both the girl's saucy attitude and the parade-like excitement they generate. Cheeky Parade is on the Avex idol label, "iDOL Street", and debuted with their 1st single "BUNBUN NINE9'” in January 2013. Their 1st single ranked in at #4 on the Oricon weekly chart, and their 2nd single and 3rd singles, "C.P.U !?” and "Mugendai Shoujo" also made the top five, ranking in at #5 and #4 respectively. Cheeky Parade made history as the first Japanese act to ever perform at the CBGB Music & Film Festival.

In October 2014, Cheeky Parade was invited to do a special live in New York City's Times Square. Recordings of the trip were featured in the music video for "CANDY POP GALAXY BOMB!!" including their live and appearance at New York Comic Con.

On 28 June 2016, Marin Yamamoto and Mariya Suzuki started a two-year hiatus with GEM member Maaya Takeda to study abroad in Los Angeles, California to study music and dance.

In April 2017, Cheeky Parade performed a remix version of "Shout along!" at SXSW 2017 live from Tokyo via NTT Japan Factory's "cyber teleportation" technology. The performance could be found in iDOL Street's official YouTube channel.

On 19 May 2017, members Seran Mizorogi and Momoka Kodakari announced their departure from Cheeky Parade. Their last live with Cheeky Parade was held on 9 June 2017.

During January 2015, members Asami Watanabe, Seran Mizorogi, and Hina Nagai formed a subunit called NERFY GUINER BIEBER with Watanabe as WATANABE (ワタナベ), Mizorogi as ROGY (ロギー), and Nagai leading as GUINER (ガイナー). The subunit performs as an opening act for Cheeky Parade. After Mizorogi's departure from Cheeky Parade in 2017, Rino Shimazaki joined the subunit as Motherky (マザーキー).

On 12 April 2018 Cheeky Parade announced they will disband on 31 July 2018. The group will hold their last concert as 7 members, with Marin Yamamoto and Mariya Suzuki returning from their hiatus to participate in the show.

== Members ==
=== Current members ===
Name	Nickname	Birth date	Age	Birthplace	Notes
Asami Watanabe (渡辺 亜紗美)	Asamin (あさみん); Watanabe (ワタナベ)	27 September 1994	31	Tochigi Prefecture	Dance leader; Member of NERFY GUINER BIEBER as WATANABE (2016–2018)
Yūna Sekine (関根 優那)	Yū-nyan (ゆ～にゃん)	28 September 1994	31	Saitama Prefecture	Former Leader (2012 – 2016)
Rino Shimazaki (島崎 莉乃)	Rinono (りのの); Motherky (マザーキー)	15 May 1996	29	Kanagawa Prefecture	Member of NERFY GUINER BIEBER as MOTHERKY (2017–2018)
Yuriya Suzuki (鈴木 友梨耶)	Yuriya (ゆりゃ)	28 August 1996	29	Tokyo	Leader (2016–2018); Sister to Mariya Suzuki. Following Cheeky Parade's disbandment, she formed a performing group with her sister, ROSE A REAL†.
Marin Yamamoto (山本 真凜)	Marin (まりん)	11 June 1997	28	Mie Prefecture	Went on hiatus from 28 June 2016 to May 2019 to study abroad at the Pacific Hills School in Los Angeles.
Hina Nagai (永井 日菜)	Hina-chun (ひなchuン); Guiner (ガイナー)	6 February 1998	27	Tokyo	Leader of NERFY GUINER BIEBER as GUINER (2016–2018)
Mariya Suzuki (鈴木 真梨耶)	Marya (まりゃ)	26 September 1999	26	Tokyo	Went on hiatus from 28 June 2016 to May 2019 to study abroad at the Pacific Hills School in Los Angeles.; Sister to Yuriya Suzuki. Following Cheeky Parade's disbandment, she formed a performing group with her sister, ROSE A REAL†.

=== Former Members ===
Name	Nickname	Birth date	Age	Birthplace	Notes
Seran Mizorogi (溝呂木 世蘭)	Seran (せらん); Rogy (ロギー)	22 April 1997	20	Tokyo	Former member of NERFY GUINER BIEBER (2016 – 2017); Left 9 June 2017
Momoka Kodakari (小鷹狩 百花)	Momo (もも)	21 February 1999	18	Osaka Prefecture	Left 9 June 2017

== Discography ==
=== Albums ===
Title	Release date	Featured songs	Chart position		Sales (Oricon)		Certification	Notes
Title	Release date	Featured songs	Oricon Weekly Singles Chart	Billboard Japan Hot 100	First week	Total	Certification	Notes
Cheeky Parade I	27 November 2013	1. INTRODUCTION ~dIscovery~; 2. C.P.U!?; 3. Check it Out (チェケラ, Chekera); 4. Cheeky Fighter (チィキィファイター); 5. After School Catharsis (放課後カタルシス, Houkago Catharsis); 6. Older Warrior (年上コイモヨヲ, Toshiue Koimoyowo); 7. Space Flight Sensation (宇宙飛行センセーション, Uchuu Hikou Sensation); 8. Love Teleportation (恋テレポーテーション, Koi Teleportation); 9. BUNBUN NINE9'; 10. Challenger; 11. Infinity Girl A (無限大少女∀, Mugendai Shoujo∀); 12. Happy Days; 13. Cheeky dreamer	14	35	8,487	8,908	-	Older Warrior (年上コイモヨヲ, Toshiue Koimoyowo) is sung by Yūna Sekine, Yuriya Suzuki, and Hina Nagai.; Space Flight Sensation (宇宙飛行センセーション, Uchuu Hikou Sensation) is sung by Momoka Kodakaru and Mariya Suzuki.; Love Teleportation (恋テレポーテーション, Koi Teleportation) is sung by Asami Watanabe, Rino Shimazaki, Seran Mizorogi, and Marin Yamamoto.
Together	18 June 2014	Together	-	-	-	-	-	Mini Album with solo versions of "Together" by all nine members.
Cheeky Parade II	1 June 2016	1. SINFONIA ~Apocalypse of Monster~; 2. M.O.N.ST@R; 3. Hungry; 4. Kizuna PUNKY ROCK !! (キズナPUNKY ROCK !!); 5. Shake It Out! (シェケナ!, Shekena); 6. Lost+Found; 7. Happy Fancy Music; 8. faith 9. SKY GATE; 10. Colorful Starlight (カラフルスターライト); 11. CANDY POP GALAXY BOMB!!; 12. WE ARE THE GREATEST NINE9'	-	-	-	-	-	

=== Singles ===
Title	Release date	Featured songs	Chart position		Sales (Oricon)		Certification	Notes
Title	Release date	Featured songs	Oricon Weekly Singles Chart	Billboard Japan Hot 100	First week	Total	Certification	Notes
Cheeky Dreamer	1 April 2012		-	-	-	-	-	Indie Single (5,000 copies only)
BUNBUN NINE9′	9 January 2013	1. BUNBUN NINE9'; 2. Tactics	4	36	22,176	24,495	-	
C.P.U!?	10 April 2013	1. C.P.U!?; 2. Unrequited Love Factory (片想いファクトリー, Kataomoi Factory)	5	65	18,623	19,616	-	
Infinity Girl A (無限大少女∀, Mugendai Shoujo∀)	4 September 2013	1. Infinity Girl A (無限大少女∀, Mugendai Shoujo∀); 2. Cheeky Fighter (チィキィファイター)	4	24	28,340	29,231	-	
CANDY POP GALAXY BOMB!! / Kizuna PUNKY ROCK !! (キズナPUNKY ROCK !!)	12 December 2014	1. CANDY POP GALAXY BOMB!!; 2. Kizuna PUNKY ROCK !! (キズナPUNKY ROCK !!)	-	-	-	-	-	
M.O.N.ST@R / Colorful Starlight (カラフルスターライト)	15 July 2015	1. M.O.N.ST@R; 2. Colorful Starlight (カラフルスターライト); 3. Glory Days	-	-	-	-	-	
SKY GATE	24 February 2016	1. SKY GATE; 2. FAITH; 3. GARLIC&ONION	-	-	-	-	-	Last single to feature Marin Yamamoto and Mariya Suzuki before hiatus.; First single to include a song by NERFY GUINER BIEBER.
Hands up!	7 September 2016	1. Hands up!; 2. Let's Party!	-	-	-	-	-	First single to not feature Marin Yamamoto and Mariya Suzuki before hiatus.
Shout along!	26 April 2017	1. Shout along!; 2. Shampoo & conditioner	22	-	4,993	-	-	Last single to feature Seran Mizorogi and Momoka Kodakari before their departure from Cheeky Parade.; Second single to include a song by NERFY GUINER BIEBER

=== Music Cards ===
Title	Release date	Featured songs	Chart position		Sales (Oricon)		Certification	Notes
Title	Release date	Featured songs	Oricon Weekly Singles Chart	Billboard Japan Hot 100	First week	Total	Certification	Notes
Our Song (僕らの歌, Bokura no Uta)	22 November 2017	1. Our Song (僕らの歌, Bokura no Uta); 2. MightyGirl; 3. JUMPER JUMPER	-	-	-	-	-	
Answer	14 February 2018	1. Answer; 2. marigold 3. I Don't Care	-	-	-	-	-	Final Single

=== Collaborations ===
Single	Artist	Release date	Songs Participated in	Notes
Puri Puri♥SUMMER Kiss (プリプリ♥SUMMERキッス, PuriPuri♥SUMMER Kissu)	SUPER☆GiRLS	4 July 2012	STEP to Tomorrow! (明日へSTEP!, Ashita e STEP!)	With All iDOL Street Members
TRF Respect Idol Tribute!! (TRFリスペクトアイドルトリビュート!!, TRF Risupekuto Aidoru Toribyūto!!)	IRF, Idoling!!!, Dream5, Tokyo Girls' Style, BiS, iDOL Street, and DJ KOO from TRF	19 December 2012	BOY MEETS GIRL; Love & Peace Forever	"BOY MEETS GIRL" featured Yuriya Suzuki as a member of IRF (IDOL RAVE FACTORY) with Mei Shouji of Tokyo Girls' Style, Yurika Tachibana of Idoling!!!, Mikoto Hibi of Dream5, and Pour Lui of BiS; "Love & Peace Forever" featured Yuriya Suzuki, Marin Yamamoto, and Hina Nagai with SUPER☆GiRLS and Street-sei.
Celebration	SUPER☆GiRLS	20 February 2013	Celebration	With All iDOL Street Members
Everlasting Summer High Touch (常夏ハイタッチ, Tokonatsu Hai Tatchi)	SUPER☆GiRLS	12 June 2013	PAN-PAKA-PAN!	With All iDOL Street Members
Ahhahha! ~Music of Transcending Laughs~ (アッハッハ! ～超絶爆笑音頭～, Ahhahha! ~Chouzetsu Bakushou Ondo~)	SUPER☆GiRLS	13 August 2014	Happy・Circle・Street (ハッピー・サークル・ストリート, Happī・Sākuru・Sotorīto)	With All iDOL Street Members
CR Hana no Keiji 10th Anniversary Celebration Album (CR花の慶次 10周年記念アルバム, CR Hana no Keiji 10-shūnen Kinen Arubamu)	–	20 December 2017	Flower of a Warrior (武士ノ花, Bushi no Hana)	Featured in the 10th Anniversary album for CR Hana no Keiji (CR花の慶次).

== Music videos ==
Title	Official YouTube link	Album	Single	Music Card	Notes
BUNBUN NINE9′	watch	Cheeky Parade I	BUNBUN NINE9'	-	
BUNBUN NINE9′	watch	Cheeky Parade I	BUNBUN NINE9'	-	Another Version 1
C.P.U !?	watch	Cheeky Parade I	C.P.U !?	-	Panorama Version
Infinity Girl A (無限大少女∀, Mugendai Shoujo∀)	watch	Cheeky Parade I	Infinity Girl A (無限大少女∀, Mugendai Shoujo∀)	-	Outside Version
Check it Out (チェケラ, Chekera)	watch	Cheeky Parade I	-	-	
Together	watch	Together	Together	-	Call and Response Version
Together	watch	Together	Together	-	"Special Product from Tochigi Asami" ver. ("栃木の名産亜紗美"ver., "Tochigi no Meisan Asami"ver.)
Together	watch	Together	Together	-	"It's Yūna" ver. ("やっぱ優那だな" ver., "Yappa Yuuna dana" ver.)
Together	watch	Together	Together	-	"Little Demon Seran" ver. ("小悪魔世蘭"ver., "Koakuma Seran" ver.)
Together	watch	Together	Together	-	"The Lovely Flower is Yuriya" ver. ("好きなお花は友梨耶"ver., "Suki na Ohana wa Yuriya"ver.)
Together	watch	Together	Together	-	"I'm Marin" ver. ("俺の真凜"ver., "Ore no Marin"ver.)
Together	watch	Together	Together	-	"Shimazaki Out" ver. ("島崎アウト"ver.)
Together	watch	Together	Together	-	"Nagai Player" ver. ("永井選手"ver., "Nagai Senshu"ver.)
Together	watch	Together	Together	-	"I Love Momoka" ver. ("百花が好きやねん" ver., "Momoka ga Suki yanen" ver.)
Together	watch	Together	Together	-	"Number One cheeky Mariya-hho" ver. ("一番cheeky真梨耶っほー"ver., "Ichiban cheeky Mariya-hho"ver.)
CANDY POP GALAXY BOMB!!	watch	Cheeky Parade II	CANDY POP GALAXY BOMB!! / Kizuna PUNKY ROCK !! (キズナPUNKY ROCK !!)	-	
M.O.N.ST@R	watch	Cheeky Parade II	M.O.N.ST@R / Colorful Starlight (カラフルスターライト)	-	Down the Road ver.
Colorful Starlight (カラフルスターライト)	watch	Cheeky Parade II	M.O.N.ST@R / Colorful Starlight (カラフルスターライト)	-	
SKY GATE	watch	Cheeky Parade II	SKY GATE	-	
GARLIC&ONION	watch	-	SKY GATE	-	As NERFY GUINER BIEBER
WE ARE THE GREATEST9'	watch	Cheeky Parade II	-	-	
Hands up!	watch	-	Hands up!	-	Short ver.
Shampoo & conditioner	watch	-	Shout along!	-	As NERFY GUINER BIEBER
Shout along!	watch	-	Shout along!	-	
OHANA	watch	-	-	-	As NERFY GUINER BIEBER
Our Song (僕らの歌, Bokura no Uta)	watch	-	-	Our Song (僕らの歌, Bokura no Uta)	
MightyGirl	watch	-	-	Our Song (僕らの歌, Bokura no Uta)	
JUMPER JUMPER	watch	-	-	Our Song (僕らの歌, Bokura no Uta)	
