= Riria =

Riria may refer to:

== Given name ==
- Riria Itō (born 2002), member of Japanese female idol group Nogizaka46
- Riria Kojima (born 1993), Japanese actress
- Riria Smith (1935–2012), New Zealand Māori weaver

== Surname ==
- Jennifer Riria, Kenyan business woman, corporate executive, banker and academic
