= Idol Street =

Japanese music project and record label

- Parent company: Avex Group Holdings
- Founded: October 2, 2010
- Founder: Tatsuo Higuchi (supervising producer)
- Genre: J-pop (idols)
- Country of origin: Japan
- Location: Tokyo
- Official website: idolstreet.jp

Idol Street (stylized as iDOL Street) is a Japanese record label and music project specializing in idols.

It was launched by Avex on October 2, 2010, as a dedicated idol record label. The first artist on the label was the idol group Super Girls, formed in June 2010. As of March 2015, four girl groups have debuted on the label: Super Girls, Cheeky Parade (Until Summer 2018), GEM (Until Spring 2018), and The World Standard.

== Idol Street Project ==
The project includes 15 members: 11 members of Super Girls and 4 members of The World Standard.

=== Former Members ===
==== Street-sei ====
Yokono Sumire (now a member of NMB48)

==== Solo ====
- Saori Yasaka (八坂 沙織) — graduated from Super Girls on February 23, 2014
