= Wu Rujun =

Chinese musician and jinghu player (born 1963)

- Born: August 12, 1963 (age 61); Nanjing, Jiangsu, China
- Occupations: Musician; composer; director; actor
- Years active: 1984–
- Musical career
- Genres: Peking opera; film score
- Instrument: Jinghu
- Labels: Avex Io
- Website: Official website; Official profile

Wu Rujun (呉 汝俊, Ū Rūchin, born 12 August 1963, in Nanjing, Jiangsu, China) is a Chinese musician and jinghu player.

== Discography ==
=== Singles ===
Year	Title
2002	"It's For You"
2002	"Aoki Shishi / Shinjitsu no Uta"
2003	"Mukyō"
2004	"Ai"
2005	"Kumikyoku / Sangokushi"
2005	"Bridge: Best of Wu Rujun"

== Participated works ==
Year	Title
2002	Do As Infinity "Shinjitsu no Uta"
