= Idol Time PriPara =

Japanese anime by DongWoo A&E

アイドルタイムプリパラ (Aidoru Taimu Puripara)
- Genre: Idol
- Video game
- Developer: Syn Sophia
- Publisher: Takara Tomy Arts
- Genre: Rhythm, Dress-up
- Platform: Arcade
- Released: April 4, 2017
- Manga
- Written by: Hitsuji Tsujinaga
- Published by: Shogakukan
- Magazine: Ciao
- Original run: April 2017 – March 2018
- Anime television series
- Directed by: Makoto Moriwaki
- Written by: Michihiro Tsuchiya
- Studio: Tatsunoko Production, DongWoo A&E
- Licensed by: Crunchyroll: SEA: Medialink
- Original network: TXN (TV Tokyo), BS Japan, AT-X
- Original run: April 4, 2017 – March 27, 2018
- Episodes: 51
- Anime film

PriPara & Kiratto Pri☆Chan Movie: Sparkling Memorial Live
- Directed by: Nobutaka Yoda
- Written by: Hiroko Fukuda
- Studio: Tatsunoko Production
- Licensed by: SA/SEA: Medialink
- Released: May 5, 2018
- Runtime: 85 minutes
- Original net animation

Idol Land PriPara
- Directed by: Makoto Moriwaki
- Written by: Michihiro Tsuchiya
- Music by: Avex Pictures
- Studio: Tatsunoko Production
- Released: August 18, 2021 – April 24, 2024
- Episodes: 12
- Video game

Idol Land PriPara
- Developer: Syn Sophia; Arc System Works
- Publisher: JP: Takara Tomy Arts; WW: Koei Tecmo
- Genre: Rhythm, Dress-up
- Platform: Android, iOS
- Released: August 17, 2023
- Other series
- Pretty Rhythm: Aurora Dream (2011); Pretty Rhythm: Dear My Future (2012); Pretty Rhythm: Rainbow Live (2013); PriPara (2014); Idol Time PriPara (2017); Kiratto Pri☆Chan (2018); Waccha PriMagi! (2021); Himitsu no AiPri (2024); Onegai AiPri (2026)

Idol Time PriPara (アイドルタイムプリパラ, Aidoru Taimu Puripara) is an anime series produced by Tatsunoko Production and DongWoo A&E. The second animation adaption of the PriPara arcade game, it is a continuation of PriPara, being the sequel to the PriPara anime series. It began airing from April 4, 2017, to March 27, 2018, and was followed by Kiratto Pri☆Chan on April 8, 2018. A mobile game, Idol Land PriPara was released on August 17, 2023.

== Plot ==
Yui Yumekawa is a sixth grader in Avocado Academy, who daydreams a lot and wishes to become an idol, despite her school forbidding PriPara for students. After receiving her PriTicket, she finds out a new PriPara is opening, and Laala Manaka, the Divine Idol from the previous series, is in town, she also is her roommate in Avocado Academy, having been sent there to continue her Divine Idol duties.

However, Yui does not believe it, as a fold in Laala's PriTicket causes a system bug, leaving Laala unable to carry out PriPara change, and it is only after seeing Laala's idol form in the former's first performance in Paparajuku that Yui is finally convinced.

The upcoming Idol Time Grand Prix is also announced, however, with a lack of visitors, both the competition and the Paparajuku PriPara would be shut down, and so would Laala's job as a Divine Idol. And so, it was up to Laala and Yui to keep a flow of visitors to Paparajuku PriPara, such many characters from the original series turn up to help.

=== Characters ===
==== MY☆DREAM ====
Yui Yumekawa (夢川 ゆい, Yumekawa Yui)
Voiced by: Arisa Date
Yui is a sixth grader in Class A at Avocado Academy. She has a habit of daydreaming a lot and carries around Cooky, a rice cooker, as she spaces out in-between meals. She has short blonde hair in partly pigtails with a light blue hair bow, while in PriPara, she is taller, her hair is longer, she gains a pink hair bow, her pigtails are straighter, and her eyes gain a star marking. A Lovely-type idol, her theme color is pastel pink and uses her self-created brand, Fantasy Time.
Nino Nijiiro (虹色 にの, Nijiiro Nino)
Voiced by: Yō Taichi
Nino is a sixth grader in Class C at Avocado Academy. She is a girl full of passion and is skilled at sports. She has a tomboyish figure outside of PriPara, having short blue-green hair and green eyes. In PriPara, she becomes taller and her hair grows longer, also gaining a green ombré. A Pop-type idol, her theme color is neon green and her brand is Neon Drop.
Michiru Kouda (幸多 みちる, Kōda Michiru)
Voiced by: Yuina Yamada
Michiru is a second-year student at Avocado Academy. She is usually a shy and quiet girl who is rather clumsy. She has gray hair styled into lower twintails, red-violet eyes, wears glasses and has freckles. In PriPara, her hair is set loose with some of it tied into braids. Her eyes gained black pupils as well. Her personality in PriPara changes into a more arrogant and confident person who refers to herself as someone possessed by the ghost princess "Miichiru" (ミーチル). A Cool-type idol, her theme color is dark purple and her brand is Melty Lily, which Aroma made for her. She became Aroma's "little devil" in episode 14.

==== EVER GOLD ====
Shuuka Hanazono (華園 しゅうか, Hanazono Shūka)
Voiced by: Madoka Asahina
Debuted in episode 24, she is the younger sister of Divine Idol Mia Hanazono, who is the member of an idol trio Saints. Shuuka is obsessed with making money, often she have out of a feeling of rivalry with Yui. She's a Celeb-type idol and her brand is Rich Venus.
Garara•S•Leep (ガァララ・ス・リープ, Gaarara Su Rīpu)
Voiced by: Tomoyo Kurosawa
Garara is an older sister of Janice, Falala's twin sister, and a time spirit of ancient PriPara who was in charge during the night. As no one came to PriPara during the night, Garara was alone and grew out of jealousy to Falala. She discovers she can stay awake in the day if Pakku steals girls' dreams causing Falala to sleep forever.
Mimiko Jigoku (地獄 ミミ子, Jigoku Mimiko)
Voiced by: Reina Ueda
Avocado Academy's head disciplinarian. When she was young, Mimiko's dream was to become an idol. When she enrolled into Avocado Academy as a preschooler, she was taken care of by the headmistress whom she saw as a mother-like figure. After being told she couldn't be an idol in preschool because of her family name meaning "hell", Mimiko would despise the idea of PriPara until episode 16 when she remembered her dream and decided to go on a journey. In episode 23, Mimiko returns to Paparajuku and becomes a PriPara idol with Bavaria.

==== WITH ====
Shougo Yumekawa (夢川 ショウゴ, Yumekawa Shōgo)
Voiced by: Seiichirō Yamashita
Yui's brother, a second-year student at Avocado Academy. The center of WITH who frequently teases Yui a lot.
Asahi Mitaka (三鷹 アサヒ, Mitaka Asahi)
Voiced by: Tatsuyuki Kobayashi
Shōgo's teammate.
Koyoi Takase (高瀬 コヨイ, Takase Koyoi)
Voiced by: Reiou Tsuchida
Shōgo's teammate.

=== Other Idols ===
Falala•A•Larm (ファララ・ア・ラーム, Farara A Rāmu)
Voiced by: Azusa Sato
Falala is an older sister of Jewlie, Garara's twin sister, and a time spirit of ancient PriPara who was in charge during the day. She feel asleep when Pakku and Gaarara began stealing girls' dreams causing them to forget about PriPara. She can be awakened again if the idols of the new PriPara help girls find their dreams. She's a Premium-type idol and her brand is Clock Garden.
Mia Hanazono (華園 みあ, Hanazono Mia)
Voiced by: Rumi Ōkubo
Shuuka's older sister who is one of the legendary Divine Idols and the member of an idol trio Saints. She's the parallel version of the character, Mia Ageha from Pretty Rhythm: Dear My Future.

=== Mascots ===
Punicorn (プニコン, Punikon)
Voiced by: Saki Yamakita
Yui's manager. She takes the form of a unicorn.
Chuppe (チュッペ, Chuppe)
Voiced by: Yū Serizawa
Nino's manager. She takes the form of a mouse.
Pitsuji (ピツジ, Pitsuji)
Voiced by: Azuki Shibuya
Michiru's manager. She takes the form of a sheep.
Powan (ポワン, Powan)
Voiced by: Miyu Kubota
Shuuka's manager. She takes the form of a dog.
Pakku (パック, Pakku)
Voiced by: Yuki Wakai
Garara's manager. She takes the form of a tapir.

=== Avocado Academy ===
Bavaria Ookandagawa (大神田川 ババリア, Ookandagawa Babaria)
Voiced by: Urara Takano
The headmistress of Avocado Academy who is the cousin of Paprika Academy headmistress Gloria Ookanda. She despised the idea of female idols until she saw Yui performing with a twisted ankle. In episode 23, Bavaria became a PriPara idol with Mimiko Jigoku whom she took care of as mother since Mimiko enrolled in Avocado Academy. She is a fan of WITH.

== Media ==
=== Anime ===
The anime was first announced in January 2017 as a successor to the PriPara TV series, with an April 2017 premiere date. The anime premiered on TV Tokyo, and through its affiliates via the TX Network on April 4. The anime can be seen on the Crunchyroll streaming service while Medialink licensed the anime in Southeast Asia. Furthermore, the anime series also aired on MBC in South Korea and on TVB Jade in Hong Kong.

=== Film ===
PriPara & Kiratto Pri☆Chan Movie: Sparkling Memorial Live, was released on May 5, 2018.

=== PriPara: All Idol Perfect Stage! ===
PriPara: All Idol Perfect Stage! (プリパラ オールアイドルパーフェクトステージ！) is a rhythm game developed by Syn Sophia and published by Capcom for the Nintendo Switch, released on March 22, 2018. Players create a custom character to dance to songs from the PriPara anime, as well as to songs exclusive to the game. Gameplay consists of timing button presses to on-screen prompts. the game also includes a harder difficulty called Gold Mode to add additional green and blue prompts that utilize different buttons. By performing well in the rhythm sections of the game, currency is gained that players can spend to customize their avatar with additional accessories and outfits. the game introduces Mirai Momoyama the main character from Kiratto Pri☆Chan.

=== Idol Land PriPara ===
A mobile app titled Idol Land PriPara was released on December 6, 2020. In the app, players create and customize characters who can become idols. An anime adaptation was released alongside the app. Produced by Tatsunoko, the anime was directed by Makoto Moriwaki, Michihiro Tsuchiya supervised the scripts, and Avex Pictures produced the music. Originally set to be released in Q2 2021, the game was delayed five times to August 17, 2023. Soon after launch, however, the game underwent a maintenance until August 23, as its servers were overwhelmed by the number of users. The anime was postponed alongside the game, during which time four episodes were previewed.

=== Music ===
Openings:

"Just be yourself" by The World Standard
"The Biggest Paradox" (最上級ぱらどっくす, Saijō Kyō Paradokkusu) by The World Standard
"Memorial" by Iris

Endings:

"Idol:Time!!" by Laala Manaka (Himika Akaneya) and Yui Yumekawa (Arisa Date).
"Heartful♡Dream!" (ハートフル♡ドリーム, Hātofuru♡Dorīmu) by Yui Yumekawa (Arisa Date), Nino Nijiiro (Yō Taichi) and Michiru Kouda (Yuina Yamada)
"WELCOME TO DREAM" by The World Standard.

Insert Songs:

Tick Tock・Magical・Idol Time!" (チクタクMagicaるアイドルタイム！, Chikutaku Magikaru Aidoru Taimu!) by Yui Yumekawa (Arisa Date)
"Gira Galactic・Tightrope" (ギラ・ギャラクティック・タイトロープ, Gira Gyarakutikku・Taitorōpu) by WITH [Shougo Yumekawa (Seiichirō Yamashita), Koyoi Takase (Reiou Tsuchida), and Asahi Mitaka (Tatsuyuki Kobayashi). It is the first song to be sung entirely by male performers.
"Brand-New Happiness" (ブランニュー·ハピネス！, Buran Nyū·Hapinesu!) by Laala Manaka (Himika Akaneya) and Yui Yumekawa (Arisa Date)
"Shuttlewise Game" (あっちゃこっちゃゲーム, Accha Koccha Gēmu) by Nino Nijiiro (Yō Taichi)
"GOst♭Coaster" (GOスト♭コースター, GOsuto♭Kōsutā) by Michiru Kouda (Yuina Yamada)
"Clean Mind, Clean Hit♡Clang BUDDY" (快打洗心♡カッキン BUDDY, Kaida Senshin♡Kakkin BUDDY) by Sion Tōdō (Saki Yamakita) and Nino Nijiiro (Yō Taichi)
"Miss. Prillionaire" (Miss.プリオネア, Miss. Purionea) by Shuuka Hanazono (Madoka Asahina)
"Sunshine Bell" (サンシャイン・ベル, Sanshain・Beru) by Falala•A•Larm (Azusa Satō).
"Believe My DREAM!" by MY☆DREAM [Yui Yumekawa (Arisa Date), Nino Nijiiro (Yō Taichi) and Michiru Kouda (Yuina Yamada)
"Starlight Carnival☆" (すた〜らいとカーニバル☆, Suta~Raito Kānibaru☆) by Garara•S•Leep(Tomoyo Kurosawa).
"Dear My Future ~Mirai no Jibun e~" (Dear My Future ~未来の自分へ~, Dear My Future ~Mirai no Jibun e~) by Mia Hanazono (Rumi Ōkubo). It is a cover of Pretty Rhythm: Dear My Future's first opening.
"Ring Ring♪GaraFaLand" (リンリン♪がぁらふぁらんど, Rinrin♪GaraFarando) by Falala•A•Larm (Azusa Satou) and Garara•S•Leep(Tomoyo Kurosawa).
"Get Over Dress-code" by Dressing Pafé [Sion Tōdō (Saki Yamakita), Dorothy West (Azuki Shibuya), and Leona West (Yuki Wakai)]
