= Wasuta =

Japanese idol group

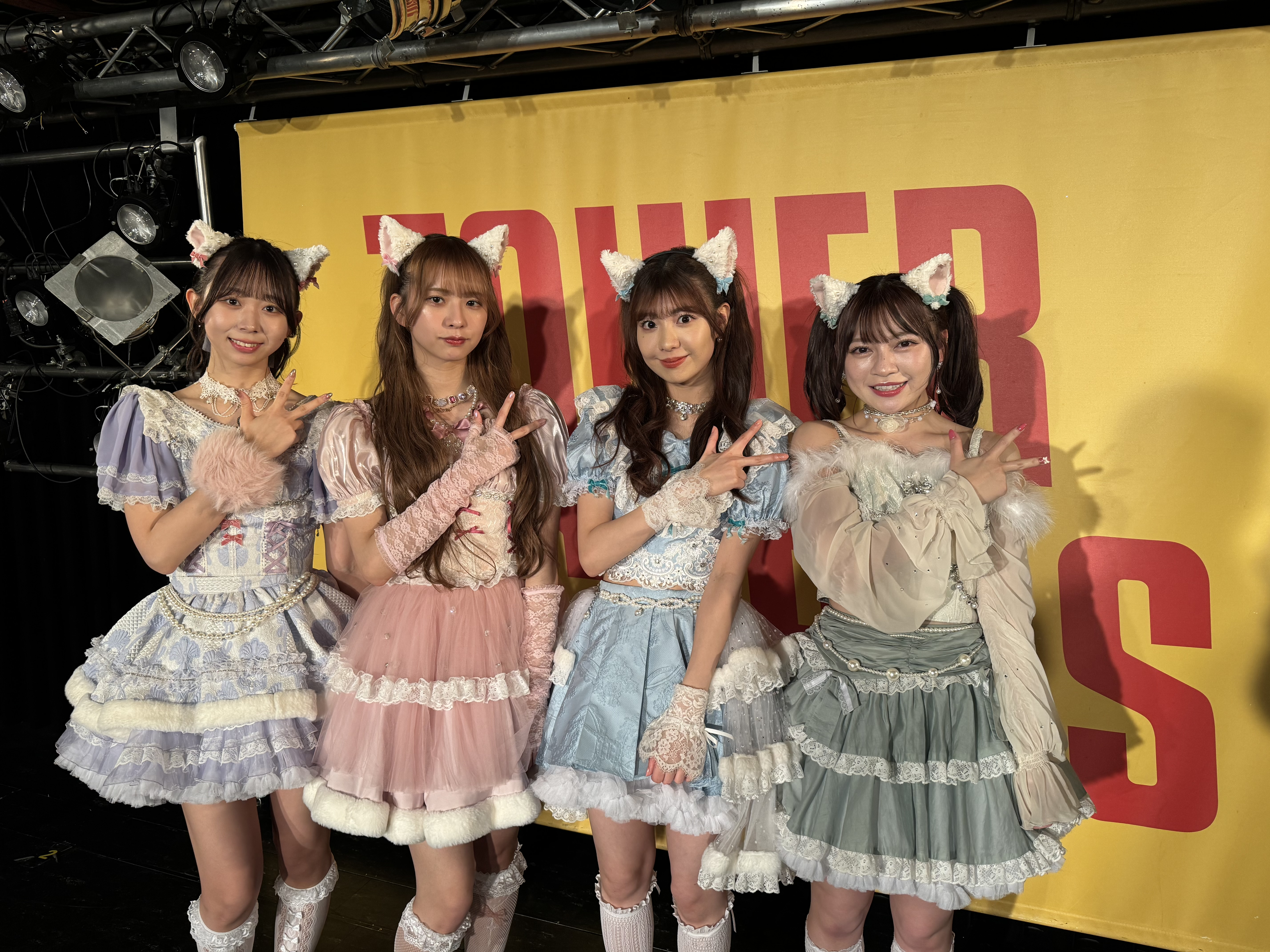
- Wasuta in February 2024

Background information
- Origin: Japan
- Genres: J-pop
- Years active: 2015–2027 (scheduled)
- Label: Idol Street
- Members: Nanase Hirokawa; Miri Matsuda; Ririka Kodama; Ruka Mishina
- Past members: Hazuki Sakamoto
- Website: wa-suta.world

Wasuta (わーすた, Wāsuta; short for The World Standard) is a Japanese girl group formed by Avex Trax in 2015. The group, which frequently uses cat-like wordplay and colorful costumes in their song lyrics and performances, has contributed songs to the anime series Idol Time PriPara and Kiratto Pri Chan. Since 2016, Wasuta has released 4 albums, 4 mini-albums, 15 CD singles, 7 digital singles, 2 live albums, 1 best album, and a live concert Blu-ray from their first nationwide Japanese tour.

The group has performed several times outside of Japan, including Japan Expo Paris 2017, Japan Weekend Madrid 2018, Japan Expo Thailand 2017-2020, Kizuna 2018 in Vietnam, Anime North 2019 in Canada, and Japan Festival in Mongolia 2019.

== History ==
=== 2015–2016: Formation and first album The World Standard ===
In January 2015, Idol Street held an audition for their fourth major idol group at Yoyogi Park Outer Field Stage. On March 29, 2015, Wasuta was formally announced at an Idol Street Street-sei event. The group's image is described as a digital age idol generation that works towards the world to spread "kawaii japan idol" culture using social media and "real idol" activities. Their first performance was on April 29 at "Idol Street Carnival 2015: Golden Parade!!!!!" at NHK Hall.

In September 2015, the members of Wasuta appeared as in-game characters in the mobile game Nyan Puzzle. They released their first digital single "Inu Neko. Seishun Massakari" in October 2015.

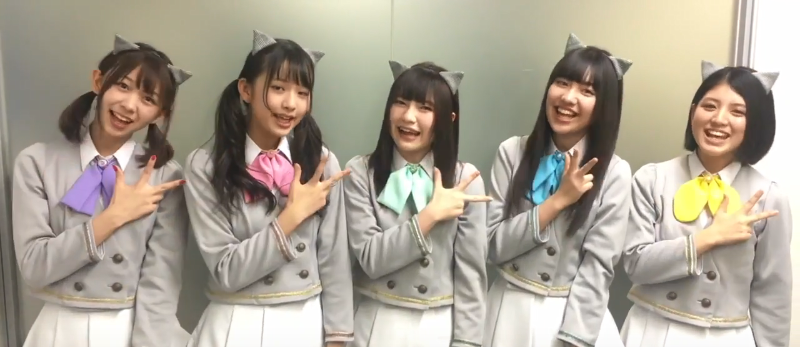
Wasuta in 2016

In February 2016, the members of Wasuta participated in a "student pass" promotion campaign for Sanrio Puroland, and performed their first one-man concert on February 28 at Shibuya Club Quattro. In May, Wasuta released their first full album, The World Standard. In June, Wasuta created the song "Pawawawawan!!! Powerpuff Girls" to promote the release of The Powerpuff Girls series in Japan, and performed at the @JAM festival in Shanghai, China. In July Wasuta appeared at C3 CharaExpo in Singapore. In September, they were appointed as official supporters for the 20th anniversary of the Tokyo Game Show, and released the song "Gu Choki Pants no Seigi San" as the opening theme for the anime series Heybot! In October, the group began the radio program "World Standard Nippon", broadcasting weekly through March 2017, and released their first CD single, "Kanzen naru Idol".

=== 2017: Idol Time PriPara and Paradox World ===
In February 2017, Wasuta released the Blu-ray video and digital album Kanzen'naru Live House Tour 2016 Tour Final at Shibuya O-West. The same month, Wasuta released the single "Yuumei ni, Nyaritai" and performed at Japan Expo Thailand 2017. In April, the follow-up single "Just Be Yourself" was released as the opening theme for the anime series Idol Time PriPara and the film PriPara Movie: Minna no Kagayake! Kirarin☆Star Live!, and the group performed at Tale in Wonderland Vol.2 in Taipei, Taiwan.

In June 2017, Wasuta returned to Taipei for the solo concert "Wasuta Land". In July, they performed in Paris, France, at Japan Expo, and in Shanghai at @JAM 2017.

In October 2017, Wasuta had same-day triple-release which included the album Paradox World, the CD single "Saijoukyuu Paradox" (a new opening theme for Idol Time PriPara), and the digital live album The World Standard ~Yume ga arukara tsuite kite ne~ @ Zepp DiverCity (Tokyo) 22.Apr. 2017. The group also announced a collaboration with the Big Echo karaoke chain.

=== 2018: Jumping Summer, Kiratto Pri Chan, "Yo Quiero Vivir" ===
In January 2018, Wasuta performed at Japan Expo Thailand 2018. In March, the group released the music card digital single "Welcome to Dream" (Idol Time PriPara ending theme), followed in April by the digital single "Pretty ☆ Channel" (Kiratto Pri☆chan ending theme).

In June 2018, Wasuta released the mini-album Jumping Summer, which featured collaborations with vocaloid producer Mikito P ("Platonic Girl"), Da-iCE's Taiki Kudo, and Shirose of White Jam ("Tapioca Milk Tea"). That same month, Wasuta was appointed official "Kawaii Ambassador" for the Rage Summer 2018 esports tournament, was featured in a promotion campaign for the Ise Egg company, and performed at Asia Comic Con in Bangkok, Thailand.

In July 2018, Wasuta collaborated with The Alley boba tea restaurant to promote the music video for "Tapioca Milk Tea", which included the members taking tea orders and serving fans in person. In August 2018, they collaborated with the Spanish duo Adexe & Nau on a Japanese/Spanish remix of the single "Yo Quiero Vivir". On September 29–30, Wasuta performed at Japan Weekend Madrid.

In October 2018, Wasuta released the single "Kira Kira Hologram" (Kiratto Pri☆chan ending theme) and the mini-album Girls Be Ambitious!

In December 2018, Wasuta was featured in a promotion campaign for Hokkaido Resort Liner and Kiroro Ski Resort, which included special wrap-around bus images and a ski-themed music video for the song "Love Unmelt". The group was also added to the artist lineup of the Japanese mobile game Girls Beat Stage. Wasuta performed at the Japan and Vietnam Sports & Culture Festival Kizuna at Hoa Lu Stadium in Ho Chi Minh City, Vietnam, on December 29 and 30, 2018.

=== 2019: Cat'ch the World, The Legend of Wasuta, "Shani Muni Ikiru!" ===
In January 2019, Wasuta performed at Japan Expo Thailand 2019 in Bangkok. In February 2019, the members of Wasuta were featured as models in a promotion campaign for the Jamie Ank spring fashion collection.

In March 2019, Wasuta returned as "Kawaii Ambassador" for the Rage Spring 2019 esports tournament and performed at @JAMxTALE 2019 in Hong Kong. Also in March, Wasuta released their third full album Cat'ch the World, which ranked number 17 on the Oricon chart. In April, the group's song "Shining Flower" was used as the ending theme song for the second season of Kiratto Pri☆chan.

On May 25, Wasuta performed their first North American concert at Anime North in Toronto, Canada. In June, the RPG-video-game themed mini-album The Legend of Wasuta was released, reaching number 15 on Oricon. In October, the group released the double-single "Shani Muni Ikiru! / Bathtub Aromatic", which was the group's first release to break into Oricon's Top 10 ranking.

Wasuta also released their first photobook Wasuta – Wonderful Collection in 2019, and launched their own YouTube channel for the group's music videos and video diaries (called "Wa→Tube") recorded in Japan and overseas.

=== 2020: Wasuta Best, 5th Anniversary, "Sunday Sunshine!", What's Standard ===
On February 1–2, 2020, Wasuta performed at Japan Expo Thailand 2020. Also in February, Japan's Hawaiian Pancake Factory created a limited-time "Wasuta Cafe" with special menu items designed by the group members and decorations in the Shinjuku restaurant.

In March 2020, Wasuta released the 2-CD Wasuta Best collection, which included the group's lead tracks from their debut in 2015 through the 2020 song "Grapefruit Moon". The set's second disc featured 10 songs chosen by members of Wasuta’s “Wa-Ship” fan club.

On March 28, 2020, Wasuta performed a no-audience livestream concert at Line Cube Shibuya for their 5th Anniversary after the original event had been cancelled by COVID-19 restrictions. On the same day, the group's second photobook 1/5 was released, featuring images of each member in her hometown.

In April 2020, the group was featured in the Japanese mobile rhythm game Ai Koi Noto. In August, Wasuta released the single "Sunday Sunshine!" In November, WaSuta released their fourth mini album What's Standard?.

=== 2021: "Haru Hanabi", "Yomibito Shirazu no Love Song", and Hazuki Sakamoto's Graduation ===
In March 2021, Wasuta released the single "Haru Hanabi". In August of the same year, Wasuta released the single "Yomibito Shirazu no Love Song", the last single featuring founding member Hazuki Sakamoto.

On June 8, 2021, Sakamoto announced that she would graduate from Wasuta, leave show business and retire from public life on December 31 in hopes of joining the workforce. Her last performance was held at Nakano Sunplaza on December 25.

=== 2022: "MiRival Dance", "Sora to Sakana", Wareware wa Neko de Aru. ===
In March 2022, Wasuta released the single "MiRival Dance", the first single after Sakamoto's retirement. On May 30, they released the single "Sora to Sakana".

On August 17, 2022, Wasuta released their fifth album, Wareware wa Neko de Aru.

=== 2023: "Suman, Inu.", "Miracle Magical Healthy Power", "Melo Melo! Love Rock" ===
On February 22, 2023, Wasuta released the single "Suman, Inu." On June 3, the group had their live performance at TIF Asia Tour 2023 in Seoul.

On July 19, they released the digital single “Miracle Magical Healthy Power”.

On August 30, they released the single “Melo Melo! Love Rock”, the first rock number in the group's discography.

=== 2024: "Eikyuumuchuu de Koushinchu!♡", "Natsukoi Dilemma" ===
On February 21, 2024, Wasuta released the single "Eikyuumuchuu de Koushinchu!♡".

On August 21, Wasuta released the single "Natsukoi Dilemma".

=== 2025-2026: "World Standard", "Sweet Fancy Chu-n", "Allegro Meiteru Run-Up" ===
On February 26, Wasuta released the single "World Standard".

On September 24, Wasuta released the singles "Sweet Fancy Chu-n" and "Allegro Meiteru Run-Up".

On March 27, 2026, the group announced they would give their final performance at the end of the year.

== Members ==
=== Current ===
- Nanase Hirokawa (廣川 奈々聖) (group leader)
- Miri Matsuda (松田 美里)
- Ririka Kodama (小玉 梨々華)
- Ruka Mishina (三品 瑠香)

=== Former ===
- Hazuki Sakamoto (坂元 葉月) (graduated 31 December 2021)

== Discography ==
=== Studio albums ===
Title	Album details	Peak chart positions	
Title	Album details	Oricon	Billboard
The World Standard	Released: May 4, 2016; Label: Idol Street; Formats: CD, digital download	17	41
Paradox World (パラドックスワールド, Paradokkusu Wārudo)	Released: October 18, 2017; Label: Idol Street; Formats: CD, digital download	32	36
Cat'ch the World	Released: March 6, 2019; Label: Idol Street; Formats: CD, digital download	17	44
We are Cats. (我々はネコである。, Wareware wa Neko de Aru.)	Released: August 17, 2022; Label: Idol Street; Formats: CD, digital download	6	8

=== Compilation albums ===
Title	Album details	Peak chart positions	
Title	Album details	Oricon	Billboard
Wasuta Best (わーすたBest)	Released: March 25, 2020; Label: Idol Street; Formats: CD, digital download	11	22

=== Extended plays ===
Title	Album details	Peak chart positions	
Title	Album details	Oricon	Billboard
Jumping Summer	Released: June 20, 2018; Label: Idol Street; Formats: CD, digital download	23	39
Girls, Be Ambitious!	Released: October 31, 2018; Label: Idol Street; Formats: CD, digital download	23	44
The Legend of Wasuta	Released: June 26, 2019; Label: Idol Street; Formats: CD, digital download	15	31
What's "standard"!?	Released: November 25, 2020; Label: Idol Street; Formats: CD, digital download	18	58

=== Singles ===
Title	Year	Peak positions		Album
Title	Year	JPN Oricon	JPN Billboard	Album
"The Perfect Idol" (完全なるアイドル, Kanzennaru Idol)	2016	25	94	Paradox World
"Wannya Be Famous" (ゆうめいに、にゃりたい。, Yuumei ni, Nyaritai)	2017	48	—	Paradox World
"Just be yourself"	2017	19	—	Paradox World
"The Biggest Paradox" (最上級ぱらどっくす, Saijōkyū Paradox)	2017	19	—	Paradox World
"Welcome to Dream"	2018	—	—	Wasuta Best
"Pretty☆Channel" (プリティー☆チャンネル, Puritī☆Channeru)	2018	—	—	Jumping Summer
"Yo Quiero Vivir" (ヨ・キエロ・ビビール, Yo・Kiero・Bibīru; I Want to Live)	2018	—	—	Girls, Be Ambitious!
"Kira Kira Hologram" (KIRA KIRA ホログラム, KIRA KIRA Horoguramu; Sparkling Hologram)	2018	—	—	Girls, Be Ambitious!
"Shani Muni Ikiru! / Bathtub Aromatic" (遮二無二 生きる！ / バスタブ・アロマティック)	2019	8	81	Wasuta Best
"Sunday! Sunshine!" (サンデー！サンシャイン！, Sandē! Sanshain!)	2020	7	—	Non-album singles
"Spring Fireworks" (春花火, Haru Hanabi)	2021	6	—	Non-album singles
"Unknown Poet’s Love Song" (詠み人知らずの青春歌(ラブソング), Yomibito Shirazu no Love Song)	2021	16	—	We are Cats.
"MiRival Dance" (ミライバルダンス, Miraibarudansu)	2022	5	93	We are Cats.
"Sky and Fish" (空とサカナ, Sora to Sakana)	2022	—	—	We are Cats.
"The World Standard Dancing Club"	2022	—	—	We are Cats.
"Cat Walkin'"	2022	—	—	We are Cats.
"Sorry, Doggy." (すまん、犬。, Suman, Inu.)	2023	5	88	Non-album singles
"Miracle Magical Healthy Power" (ミラクルマジカルヘルシーパワー, Miracle Magical Healthy Power)	2023	—	—	Non-album singles
"Melo Melo! Love Rock" (メロメロ！ラヴロック, Melo Melo! Love Rock)	2023	6	69	Non-album singles
"Eikyuumuchuu de Koushinchu!" (えいきゅーむちゅーでこうしんちゅっ！♡, Eikyuumuchuu de Koushinchu!♡)	2024	6	64	Non-album singles
"Natsukoi Dilemma" (夏恋ジレンマ, Natsukoi Dilemma)	2024	5	53	Non-album singles
"World Standard" (わーるどすたんだーど, World Standard)	2025	—	46	Non-album singles
"Sweet Fancy Chu-n"	2025	5	20	Non-album singles
"Allegro Meiteru Run-up" (アレグロめいてるランナップ, Allegro Meiteru Run-Up)	2025	5	—	Non-album singles
"Watta Life!" (わったらいふ！)	2026	3	5	Non-album singles
"—" denotes a recording that did not chart or was not released in that territory.

== Videography ==
=== Music videos ===
Title	Year
"Ultra Miracle-cle Final Ultimate Choco Beam" (うるとらみらくるくるふぁいなるアルティメットチョコびーむ, Urutora Mirakurukuru Fainaru Ultimate Choco Bīmu)	2017
"Dogs & Cats, In the Bloom of Youth" (いぬねこ。青春真っ盛り, Inu Neko. Seishun Massakari)	2017
"Pawawawawan!!! The Powerpuff Girls" (ぱわわわわん!!! パワーパフ ガールズ, Pawawawawan!!! Powerpuff Girls)	2017
"The Perfect Idol" (完全なるアイドル, Kanzennaru Idol)	2017
"Wannya Be Famous" (ゆうめいに、にゃりたい。, Yuumei ni, Nyaritai.)	2017
"Just be yourself"	2017
"The Biggest Paradox" (最上級ぱらどっくす, Saijōkyū Paradokkusu)	2017
"Welcome to Dream"	2018
"Tapioca Milk Tea (タピオカミルクティー, Tapioka Miruku Tī)	2018
"Yo Quiero Vivir" (ヨ・キエロ・ビビール, Yo・Kiero・Bibīru; I Want to Live)	2018
"Embrace Ambition！Girls, Be Ambitious！" (大志を抱け！カルビアンビシャス！, Taishi o Dake！Garu Bi Anbishasu！)	2018
"Blow Out! Knock Out! Cat Punch★ 〜We Go to War with Nyakotan [Level 5] 〜" (くらえ！必殺！！ねこパンチ★ ～私達、戦うにゃこたん【レベル５】～, Kurae! Hissatsu! ! Neko Panchi ★ 〜Watashitachi Tatakau Nyakotan [Reberu 5] 〜)	2019
Meranyaizer!!!!! 〜Kimi ni A•ge•u ♪〜" (メラにゃイザー!!!!! 〜君に、あ・げ・う♪〜, Meranyaizā!!!!! 〜Kimi ni、a・ge・u♪〜)	2019
"Live Recklessly!" (遮二無二 生きる！, Shani Muni Ikiru!)	2019
"Grapefruit moon" (グレープフルーツムーン, Gurēpufurūtsumūn)	2020
"Sunday! Sunshine!" (サンデー！サンシャイン！, Sandē! Sanshain!)	2020
"I'd like you to make it clear" (清濁あわせていただくにゃー, Seidaku awasete itadaku nya)	2020
"Spring Fireworks" (春花火, Haru Hanabi)	2021
"Unknown Poet’s Love Song" (詠み人知らずの青春歌(ラブソング), Yomibito Shirazu no Love Song)	2021
"MiRival Dance" (ミライバルダンス, Miraibarudansu)	2022
"Sky and Fish" (空とサカナ, Sora to Sakana)	2022
"The World Standard Dancing Club"	2022
"Cat Walkin'"	2022
"Mash'd Art" (マッシュ・ド・アート, Masshu do Āto)	2022
"Sorry, Doggy." (すまん、犬。, Suman, Inu.)	2023
"Miracle Magical Healthy Power" (ミラクルマジカルヘルシーパワー, Miracle Magical Healthy Power)	2023
"Melo Melo! Love Rock" (メロメロ！ラヴロック, Melo Melo! Love Rock)	2023
"Eikyuumuchuu de Koushinchu!♡" (えいきゅーむちゅーでこうしんちゅっ!♡, Eikyuumuchuu de Koushinchu!♡)	2024
"Natsukoi Dilemma" (夏恋ジレンマ, Natsukoi Dilemma)	2024
"World Standard" (わーるどすたんだーど, World Standard)	2025
"Sweet Fancy Chu-n"	2025
"Allegro Meiteru Run-up" (アレグロめいてるランナップ, Allegro Meiteru Run-Up)	2025
