= Feel the Beat =

Feel the Beat may refer to:

- Feel the Beat (Darude song), 2000
- Feel the Beat (Black Eyed Peas and Maluma song), 2020
- "Feel the Beat", a song by Chai from the album Punk
- "Feel the Beat", a song by S Club Juniors from the album Together
- Feel the Beat (film), a 2020 American film
