= The Summer You Were There =

Japanese manga series

- First tankōbon volume cover, featuring Shizuku Hoshikawa (left) and Kaori Asaka (right)

君と綴るうたかた (Kimi to Tsuzuru Utakata)
- Genre: Romance; Slice of life; Yuri
- Manga
- Written by: Yuama
- Published by: Ichijinsha
- English publisher: NA: Seven Seas Entertainment
- Magazine: Comic Yuri Hime
- Original run: May 18, 2020 – January 18, 2024
- Volumes: 6
- icon

The Summer You Were There (Japanese: 君と綴るうたかた, Hepburn: Kimi to Tsuzuru Utakata) is a Japanese manga series written and illustrated by Yuama. It was serialized in Ichijinsha's yuri manga magazine Comic Yuri Hime from May 2020 to January 2024, with its chapters collected in six tankōbon volumes. It has been licensed for English release in North America by Seven Seas Entertainment.

== Synopsis ==
Shizuku Hoshikawa, a high schooler and loner, secretly writes a novel. When it is nearly summer break, it is read by Kaori Asaka, a popular figure in their class. Though Shizuku was prepared for harsh criticism, Kaori praises it highly and expects her to write her next work, a romance novel about the two of them. Shizuku refuses, but Kaori asks for a date if she will not write it.

== Characters ==
Shizuku Hoshikawa (星川 雫, Hoshikawa Shizuku)
Voiced by: Reina Ueda (PV)
She is a first-year high school student who avoids interacting with others. Hoshikawa writes novels and posted Girl Lover's Suicide (少女心中, Shōjo Shinjū) on the novel site noveL. She has an older sister, Shizuka.
Kaori Asaka (朝香 夏織, Asaka Kaori)
Voiced by: Azumi Waki (PV)
She is a first-year high school student and Shizuku's classmate. A popular member of their class, she behaves cheerfully, actively calling out to Shizuku who avoids others.
Ruri Ichinose (一ノ瀬 るり, Ichinose Ruri)
She was Shizuku's classmate in fifth grade, and now attends a different high school.
Seri Ichihara (市原 芹, Ichihara Seri)
Ruri's friend.
Shizuka Hoshikawa (星川 静, Hoshikawa Shizuka)
Shizuku's older sister. She attends a beauty school and wants to be a hairdresser.
Shio Asaka (朝香 しお, Asaka Shio)
Kaori's younger sister.

== Publication ==
Written and illustrated by Yuama, The Summer You Were There was serialized in Ichijinsha's Comic Yuri Hime from May 18, 2020, to January 18, 2024. Ichijinsha published its collected chapters in six tankōbon volumes from January 18, 2021, to February 17, 2024.

The manga has been licensed for English release in North America by Seven Seas Entertainment.

=== Volumes ===
No.	Original release date	Original ISBN	English release date	English ISBN
1	January 18, 2021	978-4-7580-2202-6	October 4, 2022	978-1-63858-640-1
1. "I'm Disappearing" (消えかけの私, Kie kake no watashi); 2. "Enigmatic" (不可解, Fukakai); 3. "At the Library" (図書館にて, Toshokan nite); 4. "Seeds" (タネ, Tane); 5. "Confession" (告白, Kokuhaku)
2	June 17, 2021	978-4-7580-2266-8	December 13, 2022	978-1-63858-779-8
6. "Caught in the Downpour" (驟雨に溺れる, Shūu ni oboreru); 7. "Reflection" (追憶, Tsuioku); 8. "Unseal" (封を切る, Fūwokiru); 9. "Face-to-Face" (向き合う, Mukiau); 10. "Ablaze" (閃き, Hirameki)
3	February 17, 2022	978-4-7580-2368-9	June 13, 2023	978-1-63699-164-1
11. "Name" (名前, Namae); 12. "Change" (変換, Henkan); 13. "Setting Out" (往路, Ōro); 14. "Apology" (謝罪, Shazai); 15. "You'll Be Fine, Right?" (大丈夫だよね？, Daijōbuda yo ne?)
4	August 18, 2022	978-4-7580-2451-8	January 23, 2024	978-1-68579-959-5
16. "You Are Disappearing" (消えかけの君, Kie kake no kimi); 17. "Bare" (丸裸, Maruhadaka); 18. "Aware" (認識, Ninshiki); 19. "Out in the Open" (露わ, Ro wa); 20. "Little Sister" (妹, Imōto)
5	March 16, 2023	978-4-7580-2512-6	July 30, 2024	979-8-88843-673-8
21. "Shizuku and Shiori" (雫と栞, Shizuku to shiori); 22. "Love" (恋, Koi); 23. "The Gift" (プレゼント, Purezento); 24. "Evening Cicada" (ヒグラシ, Higurashi); 25. "Vulnerable" (弱音, Yowane)
6	February 17, 2024	978-4-7580-2660-4	January 28, 2025	979-8-89160-667-8
26. "Out with Everyone" (みんなでおでかけ, Min'na de o dekake); 27. "A Repayment" (報いるために, Mukuiru tame ni); 28. "The Honest Truth" (本音, Hon'ne); 29. "Lay It All Bare" (打ち明ける, Uchiakeru); 30. "Can't Wait for Tomorrow" (樂しみな明日, Tanoshimina ashita); 31. "To Kaori" (夏織へ, Kaori e); 32. "To Shizuku" (雫へ, Shizuku e); Epilogue: "Eternity for You" (君に贈る永遠, Kimi ni okoru eien)

== Reception ==
The series was nominated for the 2022 Next Manga Award in the print manga category; it was nominated again in the same category in 2023. It was the most popular choice among English voters. It ranked eighth on AnimeJapan's "Most Wanted Anime Adaptation" poll in 2024.

== See also ==
- The Girl I Want Is So Handsome!, another manga series by Yuama
