= The Helpful Fox Senko-san =

Japanese manga series by Rimukoro

- Cover of Sewayaki Kitsune no Senko-san volume 1 featuring Senko

世話やきキツネの仙狐(せんこ)さん (Sewayaki Kitsune no Senko-san)
- Genre: Fantasy comedy; Iyashikei
- Manga
- Written by: Rimukoro
- Published by: Kadokawa Shoten
- Imprint: Kadokawa Comics Ace
- Magazine: Comic Newtype
- Original run: October 6, 2017 – November 18, 2022
- Volumes: 12
- Anime television series
- Directed by: Tomoaki Koshida
- Produced by: Mitsuhiro Ogata; Satoshi Motonaga; Tomoyuki Oowada; Aya Iizuka; Daisuke Iwasaki
- Written by: Yoshiko Nakamura
- Music by: Yoshiaki Fujisawa
- Studio: Doga Kobo
- Licensed by: NA: Crunchyroll (Note: formerly known as Funimation at the time before Sony Pictures Releasing acquired Crunchyroll years later.); SA/SEA: Muse Communication
- Original network: AT-X, Tokyo MX, TVA, KBS, SUN, BS11
- English network: SEA: Animax Asia
- Original run: April 10, 2019 – June 26, 2019
- Episodes: 12
- icon

The Helpful Fox Senko-san (Japanese: 世話やきキツネの仙狐(せんこ)さん, Hepburn: Sewayaki kitsune no Senko-san) is a Japanese web manga series written and illustrated by Rimukoro. It has been serialized online via Kadokawa Shoten's Comic Newtype website since October 2017 and has been collected in twelve tankōbon volumes. An anime television series adaptation by Doga Kobo aired on AT-X and Tokyo MX from April to June 2019.

== Plot ==
Kuroto Nakano is a young salaryman with a very unhappy and stressful life, almost entirely occupied by his job at the company for which he works. One night, after yet another day spent overworking, the moment he opens the door of his home he finds a seemingly young girl with fox ears and a tail cooking dinner for him – her name is Senko, an 800-year-old fox demigod. Senko has been sent to Earth from the spirit world to relieve Kuroto from his unhappy life and help him find happiness again.

== Characters ==
Senko (仙狐, Senko; lit. 'Fairy Fox')
Voiced by: Azumi Waki (Japanese); Kristen McGuire (English)
Senko is an 800-year-old kitsune sent from the spirit world to relieve Kuroto from his overworked and stressful life. She moves into Kuroto's home and acts like a helpful wife and mother. She proudly goes above and beyond for Kuroto, pampering him, cooking for him and cleaning his home.
Senko loves to pamper Kuroto such as cleaning him, massage, groom and gives him lap pillows to ensure he gets enough sleep. She gets sad if Kuroto prioritizes work over his health. To her dismay, Kuroto seems to have a fixation on her soft fluffy tail and ears.
Kuroto Nakano (中野玄人, Nakano Kuroto)
Voiced by: Junichi Suwabe (Japanese); Aaron Campbell (English)
Kuroto is a regular salaryman who lived an unregulated life prior to Senko's arrival. He grew up in the countryside with his grandparents before moving out to the city to work. Kuroto's health and spirit have improved over time thanks to Senko's care.
Shiro (シロ, Shiro)
Voiced by: Maaya Uchida (Japanese); Kristin Sutton (English)
Another kitsune sent to assist Kuroto due to Senko's initial difficulty in relieving the man from the darkness consuming his heart. Far more conceited and spontaneous than Senko, she sees Kuroto as a servant, thinking that humans should worship the kitsunes sent to help them. She later befriends Yasuko.
Yasuko Koenji (高円寺安子, Koenji Yasuko)
Voiced by: Ayane Sakura (Japanese); Hayden Daviau (English)
Yasuko is Kuroto's next door neighbor. She is a university student and a manga artist, spending most of her time drawing manga in her bedroom. Yasuko is shown to be lazy and messy as she eats microwave-ready meals and rarely cleans her home. As a result, Yasuko appreciates Senko's company whenever the latter comes over to clean up and prepares meals for her. Yasuko is not aware that Senko is a kitsune and mistakes her for a cosplayer. She is also an otaku and loves watching an anime called Little Yoko, Inari Girl, which features a magical fox fighting off an evil tanuki.
Yozora (夜空, Yozora)
Voiced by: Eri Kitamura (Japanese); Dawn M. Bennett (English)
A kitsune who is over 1000 years old. Yozora is Senko and Shiro's boss; she was the one that sent them to the human realm to care for Kuroto. Much to Senko's dismay, Yozora loves to playfully seduce Kuroto with her breasts and four tails.
Little Yoko (稲荷少女ヨーコ, Inari Shojo Yoko)
Voiced by: Rie Kugimiya (Japanese); Macy Anne Johnson (English)
The titular heroine of an anime called Little Yoko, Inari Girl.

== Media ==
=== Manga ===
No.	Release date	ISBN
1	April 10, 2018	978-4-04-106951-6
2	August 10, 2018	978-4-04-107271-4
3	December 10, 2018	978-4-04-107492-3
4	April 10, 2019	978-4-04-108107-5
5	October 10, 2019	978-4-04-108109-9; 978-4-04-108782-4 (SP)
6	March 10, 2020	978-4-04-109216-3
7	July 10, 2020	978-4-04-109439-6
8	December 10, 2020	978-4-04-110810-9
9	June 10, 2021	978-4-04-111445-2
10	December 10, 2021	978-4-04-111446-9
11	June 10, 2022	978-4-04-112544-1
12	February 10, 2023	978-4-04-113152-7; 978-4-04-113433-7 (SP)

=== Anime ===
An anime television series adaptation was announced on December 2, 2018. The series is animated by Doga Kobo and directed by Tomoaki Koshida, with Yoshiko Nakamura handling series composition, and Miwa Oshima designing the characters. Yoshiaki Fujisawa composed the music. The series aired from April 10 to June 26, 2019, on AT-X and various local television stations. The opening theme is "Koyoi mofumofu!!" (今宵mofumofu!!) performed by Azumi Waki and Maaya Uchida, while the ending theme is "Moffu Moffu de Yoinoja yo" (もっふもっふ DE よいのじゃよ) performed by Waki. The series ran for 12 episodes. Funimation licensed the series for English-speaking regions and produced an English dub.

No.	Title (Note: All English titles are taken from Funimation.)	Original release date
1	"I'm Going to Pamper Him to His Heart's Content!"; Transliteration: "Zonbunni amayaka shite kureyō" (Japanese: 存分に甘やかしてくれよう)	April 10, 2019
In the spirit world, three fox-like women are viewing a middle-aged man who appears to be overworked and burdened by his heavily daunting tasks at his work. As a result, he produces a dark and suffocating aura of negativity. Therefore, one of the fox girls, an 800-year-old demi-fox by the name of Senko, vows to pamper him to his heart's content. After yet another troubling night of working too hard, Kuroto arrives to find Senko cooking him dinner, much to his shock. Despite trying to get rid of her in fear of getting in trouble for having her there, Senko properly introduces herself and demands that he accept the pampering, as it is her duty to look after him. After accepting, she makes tea for him, reminding him of when he was younger and happier, causing his dark aura to dissipate.
2	"Don't be Shy, Now!"; Transliteration: "Hazukashi gara zu tomo yoiyoi" (Japanese: 恥ずかしがらずともよいよい)	April 17, 2019
The next day, Kuroto awakens, thinking his experience last night had all been a dream. However, he soon discovers that it wasn't and Senko is still there. When he realizes that he is almost late for work, Senko notices the dark aura from last night reappear and insists he stay for breakfast. Afterward, while Kuroto is away at work, Senko cleans the apartment, allowing Kuroto to arrive home and happily knowing he's being well taken care of. She then proceeds to clean his ears for him, causing him to fall asleep and dream him and Senko spending some quality time together. He awakens and asks if they've somehow met before, but even she can't recall when. Kuroto wanted to pet her ears. She allows this, only for Kuroto to curiously slip his fingers in the canal area, causing Senko to scream so loud, their neighbor comes rushing out her apartment. As thanks for doing so much for him, he offers Senko to sleep in the bed with him, so she doesn't have to sleep on the floor anymore.
3	"As Long as You're Happy"; Transliteration: "Onushi ga shiawase nara sore de yoi" (Japanese: おぬしが幸せならそれでよい)	April 24, 2019
Kuroto played a video game with Senko and won a bet; to touch her tail. She runs around, evading Kuroto, making a loud commotion. Koenji, a manga artist that lives next door, has had enough of the disruptive noises, and rushes over to open the door, to tell them to keep quiet. Seeing what Kuroto is doing with Senko, she gets the wrong idea, but leaves them be, thinking it was wrong for her to intrude so suddenly. After the awkwardness fades away, Senko has an idea and gives Koenji food, in apologies for making loud noises when Kuroto touches Senko's fur. She introduces herself as their neighbor and notices Senko's ears and tail. This makes Koenji think she is into cosplay, from a show she watched, introducing Senko to it; a similar fox-like girl doing combat against a pervy bear with a camera. Later that night, Kuroto and Senko went to a supermarket to buy food, but Kuroto told Senko to wear something to cover her ears and tail. On the way back to the apartment, Kuroto started to feel less lonely going shopping by himself, since Senko is with him.
4	"Why Must You Work on a Day Off!?"; Transliteration: "Naze kyūjitsu ni shigoto o senebanaran no ja!?" (Japanese: なぜ休日に仕事をせねばならんのじゃ！？)	May 1, 2019
Kuroto goes back to the apartment, exhausted again, only to discover he has to work on Sunday; his day off. Senko demanded he not go to work and coerces him into sleep with her tail. The next morning, Kuroto tried to get up and go to work, but Senko pampered him with her tail once more, causing him to sleep in. Kuroto awakens around dinner, sad that he had slept in. This mood changes, though, when Senko makes food using her fox-fire, much to his surprise. The next day, he goes to work while it is raining outside. Before he leaves, he shows Senko how electronic devices operate, so she doesn't have to rely so heavily on her magic. Afterward, she does some cleaning around the apartment and finished. However, she started to feel cold and wanted to turn off the air conditioner, but the tv turned on instead. Confusion sets in and Senko tried to turn everything off. But the commotion once again disrupts Koenji, and she wanted to come over, only for the apartments' breaker turned off. Kuroto returns that night to find everything shut off, and a frightened Senko vowing to never use technology again. Back in the spirit world, Yozora, a busty demi-fox who is the mentor of Senko, and Shiro, Senko's fellow demi-fox friend, are viewing all this. Upset with the outcome that followed, Shiro states that she'll travel to the real world to properly pamper Kuroto.
5	"I've Got a Tail, Too, You Know?"; Transliteration: "Shippo nara, warawa no ga arujaro?" (Japanese: しっぽなら、わらわのがあるじゃろ？)	May 8, 2019
Kuroto arrives back home to find Shiro, a second fox demi-god, in his apartment. He stares at Shiro's tail, and she notices. Trying to upstage Senko a little, she lets him touch her head. It worked, as Senko got jealous and wanted to be petted too. Shiro thinks Senko is doing a poor job with Kuroto, so she uses her fox-fire to look at Kuroto's deepest desires; he wants to touch Shiro's tail. Shiro got scared by him and leaves, passing through the wall to Koenji's apartment. Shiro apologizes to Koenji, and departs. Though it surprised her, Koenji thinks that she has gotten less sleep and is hallucinating. The next day, Senko prepares a bath for Kuroto. She wants to take a bath with him too, in hopes of making him feel better. He washes her back and saw that her tail looks damp, making him feel depressed. They got out of the bath and Senko's tail is back to normal, which he wanted to touch again. That night, Shiro keeps a watchful eye on the two from outside.
6	"You Just Want to Fluff More"; Transliteration: "Mo furitai dakejaro, onushi" (Japanese: もふりたいだけじゃろ、おぬし)	May 15, 2019
Shiro wants to continue to pamper Kuroto, but she accidentally entered Koenji's apartment instead. She thinks it is her hallucinating again, so she simply takes a nap. Shiro goes next door and Senko greeted her. Shiro finds Kuroto is resting on his day off, and invites Shiro to a game. The video game got too easy for Shiro, and she wanted to play a different one. Senko asks the both of them for a short break to eat and have tea. Kuroto notices Shiro is good at video games, only to discover she was using her mind reading powers to predict what he was going to do, and she quits for the day to go home. She almost went to Koenji's apartment and not the front door. The next day, Senko visits Koenji and gave her food, apologizing about Shiro passing by. This reveals to Koenji she wasn't hallucinating. Senko helps clean around her apartment and Koenji asked her to cosplay in a maid outfit. At night, Kuroto got home and Senko still wore the outfit. He notices the outfit, which Kuroto replied that he liked Senko's old clothes. In the spirit world, Shiro wonders about Senko's maid outfit.
7	"You Smell Like Another Fox"; Transliteration: "Onushi, Betsu no Kitsune no Nioi ga surunō" (Japanese: おぬし、別のキツネの匂いがするのう)	May 22, 2019
At dinner, Kuroto had a sore back from carrying heavy items at work, so Senko offers to massage him. The massage erased the dark aura that Kuroto had, much to Senko's happiness. Afterward, they switch places and Kuroto gave Senko a massage. But, he touched her fur by the tail base, and she didn't appreciate it. In retaliation, Senko tries to tickle him. Shiro watches them from the spirit world, wondering about their relationship. The next morning, Kuroto had a dream about Senko and eating by a tree stump. He goes to work as Koenji and Senko take out the trash. At work, a co-worker asked Kuroto for help, overworking him again. On the way back home, Kuroto runs into Shiro after missing his train. She then offers to provide a shortcut home, in exchange for some food. While walking back home through a portal she created, Shiro inquires why Senko helps Kuroto, suggesting that he may be reminding her of her old master. Arriving back home, Senko smells another scent on Kuroto, which he then tells her that Shiro was around, while he was going back home.
8	"I'll Make You Forget All About It"; Transliteration: "Warawa ga wasuresasete yarō!" (Japanese: わらわが忘れさせてやろう！)	May 29, 2019
At home, Kuroto has summer break off from work. Senko asked him how long his summer break lasts and he replied that it is for a day. Shiro unexpectedly shows up and brought them to the beach with Koenji. She was surprised and brought in by Shiro, while Koenji was sleeping. Senko thinks Shiro made a risky move by bringing her along. Shiro and Koenji went to play in the water as Nakano and Senko sat under the umbrella. He asked Senko about how close Shiro and Koenji are. Senko replied that they played video games together. Then they played volleyball until Senko's back gave out. Koenji looked through her bag and grabbed the grill, while Kuroto decided to find food nearby. He went searching for food and came to a shack to find someone there and she gave him raw food. Kuroto wanted to thank her, but she left, thinking he was talking to a ghost. Kuroto got back and they ate. At night, Senko used her fox-fire as fireworks. Koenji thought the fireworks looks differently as Shiro told her it isn't.
9	"Is This Less Embarrassing For You?"; Transliteration: "Kō sureba hazukashiku nai jaro" (Japanese: こうすれば恥ずかしくないじゃろ)	June 5, 2019
Kuroto was staring at a food program on TV and wanted to taste gratin. But he quickly leaves for work, while Senko continued watching the program. She asked Koenji about the food Nakano was craving about and Shiro wanted to help cook too. Shiro, Koenji, and Senko made gratin and after it is baked, they ate it. At night, Senko gave Nakano the gratin to eat. He notices there was something else in the food, but it tastes the same as Senko's cooking. Meanwhile, Shiro gave Koenji ramen and it tasted sweet. But she thinks Shiro has poor sense in cooking. The next day, Senko notices Nakano needs a haircut and she helps cut his hair. He remembers that Senko is cutting his hair like his mom did. They went to the bath to wash Nakano's hair. He asked Senko if it was her first time doing a haircut. Senko replied that, she didn't make any mistakes.
10	"It's Nice to Let Your Inner Child Out Now and Then, Isn't It?"; Transliteration: "Tama ni wa dōshin ni kaeru no mo yoi jaro" (Japanese: たまには童心に返るのもよいじゃろ？)	June 12, 2019
It is snowing outside. As Senko opened the window shades, it woke up Kuroto and he still needed to go to work even if it is snowing. Senko tried to stop him from going, until he received a text message on his phone. They walked around the apartment and have fun making and throwing snowballs. Koenji woke up and saw Senko making a snowball. She heads back in because it is cold. Senko and Kuroto went back to rest, but Senko's back was strained again. Kuroto asked Senko to touch her tail and she felt cold. Later Senko wanted to make dinner and Kuroto wanted to touch her tail again. She left to make dinner as Yozora shows up unannounced to see them. Yozora wants to pamper Kuroto and he saw her tail making Senko jealous. She was surprised by him and left. Senko told Kuroto about Yozora's charms and he noticed that she was jealous. So Senko thought of not making him dinner.
11	"It's Going to Be a Rough Night"; Transliteration: "Kon'ya wa sukoshi are sō ja no" (Japanese: 今夜は少し荒れそうじゃの)	June 19, 2019
As Senko is cleaning the apartment, she notices a flower design on a bento box that reminds her of Kuroto's childhood in a flashback. Later that night Senko senses that Kuroto is having problems at work, so she does something different for dinner to cheer him up. Meanwhile in the spirit world, Shiro complains that it's been a year since Senko came to help Kuroto. Yozora acknowledges this by telling her that she does not have to wait long to have Kuroto all to herself. After dinner Kuroto gets a phone call from his mother who tells him that his father has been hospitalized. Senko encourages Kuroto to go be with his family, and he gives her his phone to keep in touch. After traveling to his parents' house he finds that his father is okay. While there he visits his grandmother's grave and recalls his past with Senko. He tries giving her a call to tell her about it but gets no response in return.
12	"Still..."; Transliteration: "Sore de mo, ayatsu o..." (Japanese: それでも、あやつを......)	June 26, 2019
Kuroto returns to his apartment to find that Senko is gone and never picked up his phone which she left behind. He then visits Koenji who tells him that she saw Senko leaving with bags and thought it strange. She also remarks about Shiro's absence as both of them were really looking forward to the final episode of "Little Yoko". Meanwhile in the spirit world, Yozora informs Senko that she need not return as a year has passed with Kuroto retaining a dark gloomy arua. While Kuroto is looking for her, Senko flashes back on how his ancestor cared for her in need. Yozora reminds her that humans only live for so long saying that she will only suffer heartbreak again with Kuroto. Senko vows to continue pampering him no matter what and returns to him where they view the cherry blossoms together. Senko does not reveal what happened during her trip to the spirit world. When Kuroto thanks Senko for events during his childhood she responds in confusion, but says that she is pampering him because she wants to. The two are joined by Shiro and Koenji, who bring the final recorded episode of "Little Yoko" on Koenji's laptop.

== Reception ==
The anime has a rating of 4.7/5 on Crunchyroll based on 5.7k votes. LofZOdyssey of Comic Watch gave the anime a 7.6/10 rating, the writer stating, "If you're expecting fast-paced, hyper-energetic slapstick comedy from this show, it's best to put that thought to rest now. Senko-san was a much slower series than most, and when we pause for a moment, that makes a lot of sense."

Gadget Tsūshin included Senko's catchphrase ("uyan") in their 2019 list of the most popular anime-related buzzwords.
