= The Girl I Want Is So Handsome! =

Japanese yuri manga

- First tankōbon cover

イケメンすぎです紫葵先パイ! (Ikemen Sugi Desu Shiki-senpai!)
- Genre: Romantic comedy; Yuri
- Manga
- Written by: Yuama
- Published by: Ichijinsha
- English publisher: NA: Seven Seas Entertainment
- Magazine: Comic Yuri Hime
- Original run: October 18, 2018 – September 18, 2019
- Volumes: 2

The Girl I Want Is So Handsome! (イケメンすぎです紫葵先パイ!, Ikemen Sugi Desu Shiki-senpai!) is a Japanese yuri manga written and illustrated by Yuama. It was serialized in Ichijinsha's Comic Yuri Hime from October 2018 to September 2019 and was licensed for an English-language release by Seven Seas Entertainment in 2021. The series follows a senior member of a club who is too good-looking in both appearance and behavior, and a junior who falls for her.

== Plot ==
Hinami Ayukawa, a first-year high school student, happened to meet Shiaoi Hiiragi at a club party and fell in love at first sight. Chasing after the good-looking senior, Hinami jumped into the women's basketball club despite her lack of athleticism. She decides to become the manager of the club instead of a member, and gradually closes the gap between her and the senior she admires.

== Publication ==
Written and illustrated by Yayoi Yuama, The Girl I Want Is So Handsome! was serialized in Ichijinsha's Comic Yuri Hime from October 18, 2018, to September 18, 2019. The series was collected in two tankōbon volumes from March 2019 to October 2019.

The series is licensed for an English release in North America by Seven Seas Entertainment as an omnibus collection.

=== Volume list ===
No.	Original release date	Original ISBN	English release date	English ISBN
1	March 18, 2019	9784758079204	January 25, 2022	978-1-64827-597-5
2	October 18, 2019	9784758079891	January 25, 2022	978-1-64827-597-5

== Reception ==
Erica Friedman of Yuricon gave the omnibus an overall 9 out of 10 rating, remarking that "the strength of this particular series is the sincerity. Both Shiki and Hina are so gosh darn sincere and adorable that you really want them to be happy together." She went on to praise Yuama's art and the progress it took over the series.

Anime News Network was less favourable, giving the omnibus an overall B− rating; noting that "while The Girl I Want Is So Handsome! definitely avoids a lot of the problematic tropes that have infested many other Yuri and shoujo romances, what we're left with is so barebones that it doesn't feel nearly as appetizing as I think it wants to be."

== See also ==
- The Summer You Were There, another manga series by Yuama
