= Teach Me, Hokusai! =

Japanese manga and original net animation (ONA) series

- Manga cover

おしえて北斎 (Oshiete Hokusai!)
- Genre: Slice of life
- Manga
- Written by: Naoto Iwakiri
- Published by: Sunmark Publishing
- Magazine: cakes
- Original run: August 9, 2016 – February 7, 2017
- Volumes: 1
- Original net animation

Oshiete Hokusai!: The Animation
- Directed by: Naoto Iwakiri
- Produced by: Sou Matsumoto
- Written by: Natsu Hashimoto
- Music by: Shingo Nishimura
- Studio: CoMix Wave Films
- Licensed by: CN: bilibili
- Released: March 7, 2021 – March 14, 2021
- Runtime: 11 minutes
- Episodes: 10

Teach Me, Hokusai! (Note: English title is taken from bilibili.) (Japanese: おしえて北斎!, Hepburn: Oshiete Hokusai!) is a Japanese manga written and illustrated by Naoto Iwakiri. The original name of this manga is Yume o Kanaeru Bakusho! Nihon Bijutsu Manga Oshiete Hokusai! (夢をかなえる爆笑！ 日本美術マンガ おしえて北斎！; "Huge Laughter That Grants A Wish! Japan Arts Manga Teach Me Hokusai!") (Note: Information is taken from Japanese Wikipedia.) but, it has been serialized in cakes website as Oshiete Hokusai! from August 9, 2016, to February 7, 2017, and has been collected in single tankōbon volume. This single volume manga was published by Sunmark Publishing on June 30, 2017. A short original net animation (ONA) series adaptation by CoMix Wave Films premiered from March 7, 2021, to March 14, 2021.

== Characters ==
Tenkorin Okakura (岡倉てんこりん, Okakura Tenkorin)
Voiced by: Azumi Waki
Raijin (雷神)
Voiced by: Katsuyuki Konishi
Kanon Kano (狩野カノン, Kanō Kanon)
Voiced by: Yuki Wakai
Korin Ogata (尾形光琳, Ogata Kōrin)
Voiced by: KENN
Yuichi Takahashi (高橋由一, Takahasi Yuichi)
Voiced by: Hidenori Takahashi
Eitoku Kano (狩野永徳, Kanō Eitoku)
Voiced by: Daisuke Hirakawa
Ekaku Hakuin (白隠慧鶴, Hakuin Ekaku)
Voiced by: Junichi Suwabe
Kuniyoshi Utagawa (歌川国芳, Utagawa Kuniyoshi)
Voiced by: Yū Hayashi
Ryūsei Kishida (岸田劉生, Kishida Ryūsei)
Voiced by: Daisuke Ono
Shoen Uemura (上村松園, Uemura Shōen)
Voiced by: Ryoko Shiraishi
Seiki Kuroda (黒田清輝, Kuroda Seiki)
Voiced by: Ayumu Murase

== Media ==
=== Manga ===
No.	Release date	ISBN
1	June 30, 2017	978-4-76313-632-9

=== Anime ===
On November 7, 2020, it was announced that Teach Me, Hokusai! would receive an original net animation series adaptation. This anime series is produced by Japanese studio CoMix Wave Films who also produced popular films Your Name and Weathering with You. Directed by Naoto Iwakari who also wrote the manga of this title and Sou Matsumoto is the producer. Series composition by Hayato Morohashi, character design and key animation by Yuusuke Itou. Haru Yamada directed the sound and sound work by Sound Team Don Juan. Sound effects by Naoto Yamatani. Shingo Nishimura composed the music. Tokin directed the original art and background art, script or screenplay written by Natsu Hashimoto. Production generalisation by Yuuchi Sakai and photography by Norihisa Nakama. bilibili is streaming this anime on Mainland China, South Asia and Southeast Asian territories.

The opening theme song of this anime is "Tenkorin no Theme (The Theme of Tenkorin)" by CHAI featuring Tenkorin Okakura (CV: Azumi Waki) and Raijin (CV: Katsuyuki Konishi). And the ending theme song is "Oshiete Hokusai! (Teach Me, Hokusai!)" by Kami Suzuki Brothers (P.O.P) and YMCK.
