= Ao-chan Can't Study! =

Japanese manga series

- Cover of Ao-chan Can't Study! volume 1 by Kodansha

淫らな青ちゃんは勉強ができない (Midara na Ao-chan wa Benkyō ga Dekinai)
- Genre: Romantic comedy
- Manga
- Written by: Ren Kawahara
- Published by: Kodansha
- English publisher: NA: Kodansha USA
- Magazine: Shōnen Magazine Edge
- Original run: October 17, 2015 – December 17, 2018
- Volumes: 8
- Manga

Ao-chan Can't Study: Otona-hen
- Written by: Ren Kawahara
- Published by: Kodansha
- Magazine: Shōnen Magazine Edge
- Original run: January 17, 2019 – April 17, 2020
- Volumes: 3
- Anime television series
- Directed by: Keisuke Inoue
- Produced by: Rina Shinoda; Makoto Furukawa; Hiroyuki Aoi
- Written by: Michiko Yokote
- Music by: Hiroaki Tsutsumi
- Studio: Silver Link
- Licensed by: Sentai Filmworks (Worldwide rights excluding Asia): SA/SEA: Muse Communication
- Original network: MBS, TBS, BS-TBS
- Original run: April 6, 2019 – June 22, 2019
- Episodes: 12

Ao-chan Can't Study! (Japanese: 淫らな青ちゃんは勉強ができない, Hepburn: Midara na Ao-chan wa Benkyō ga Dekinai; lit. "Lewd Ao-chan Can't Study") is a Japanese manga series written and illustrated by Ren Kawahara. The series was serialized in Kodansha's Shōnen Magazine Edge magazine from October 2015 to December 2018, and was compiled into eight tankōbon volumes. The manga is licensed in North America by Kodansha USA, who began releasing the manga digitally in English in September 2018. A sequel manga was launched in January 2019, and an anime television series adaptation by Silver Link aired from April 6 to June 22, 2019.

== Plot ==
When she was in kindergarten, Ao Horie shared a short essay about herself, which she soon regrets, because of her father, Hanasaki Horie, who is an author of erotic novels. Ao aims to go to an elite university to finally leave her father, but she soon meets Takumi Kijima in their first year in high school. Ao cannot think of a way to avoid Takumi and constantly thinks of them as a couple. Ao believes her father has influenced her way of thinking, and is often disturbed by Takumi being in love with her.

== Characters ==
Ao Horie (堀江 青, Horie Ao)
Voiced by: Azumi Waki (Japanese); Sarah Wiedenheft (English)
A high school girl who tries not to associate with any of her classmates, especially boys, because her father is an erotic novelist. She is a top student, and aspires to someday live far away. She has a negative view of boys and sex, thinking they are all perverts and wolves, even though she has boys often flirting with her due to her beauty. That is until Takumi Kijima, who is in love with her, wanted to be friends with her, leaving her baffled and emotionally confused. Ao cannot seem to avoid him and often gets into embarrassing situations with Takumi. Although she is initially annoyed and disturbed by Takumi's romantic advances towards her, she later develops feelings for him and becomes his girlfriend.
Takumi Kijima (木嶋 拓海, Kijima Takumi)
Voiced by: Junta Terashima (Japanese); Blake Jackson (English)
Ao's classmate in high school is popular and is in love with Ao and is thrilled when Ao inadvertently makes the first move in wanting to be friends with him. He occasionally points out embarrassing situations with Ao, even though she tries to ignore it and avoid him at first. He is desperate of wanting to win Ao's heart, so much so that he often gets jealous whenever other boys try to flirt with her. He later starts dating Ao when she finally reciprocates his feelings.
Hanasaki Horie (堀江 花咲, Horie Hanasaki)
Voiced by: Kenjiro Tsuda (Japanese); David Harbold (English)
Ao's father and a well-known erotic novelist. His major works are Promiscuous Lament and 100 Words of Significance in Bed. He likes to intervene in Ao's social life. His character resembles Happosai from the Ranma ½ manga.
Miyabi Takaoka (高岡 雅, Takaoka Miyabi)
Voiced by: Juri Kimura (Japanese); Natalie Rial (English)
An old classmate of Ao from kindergarten. She has a crush on Takumi, but she does not understand why he likes Ao. She and Ao do not get along very well.
Souichiro Yabe (矢部 総一郎, Yabe Sōuichirō)
Voiced by: Takashi Kondō (Japanese); Joe Daniels (English)
The editor for Hanasaki's novels.
Masaki Uehara (上原 将生, Uehara Masaki)
Voiced by: Yusuke Shirai (Japanese); Bryson Baugus (English)
One of Takumi's friends, who also likes Ao.
Shuhei Yonezuka (米塚 周平, Yonezuka Shūhei)
Voiced by: Toshinari Fukamachi (Japanese); Mike Haimoto (English)
One of Takumi's friends.

== Media ==
=== Manga ===
Ao-chan Can't Study!, written and illustrated by Ren Kawahara, was serialized in Kodansha's Shōnen Magazine Edge magazine from October 2015 to December 2018. Kodansha USA has licensed the manga in North America, which has been releasing the manga digitally in English since September 2018. It was compiled into eight tankōbon volumes. A sequel manga began serialization in January 2019.

No.	Original release date	Original ISBN	English release date	English ISBN
1	June 17, 2016	978-4-06-391015-5	September 25, 2018	978-1-64-212488-0
1. "Men!" (男なんて, Otoko nante); 2. "A Man's Weapon" (男の武器, Otoko no Buki); 3. "After Training" (調教の先, Chōkyō no Saki); 4. "Who's Trash" (クズは誰か, Kuzu wa dare ka); 5. "High-Maintenance Women" (面倒くさい女, Mendō-kusai onna)
2	November 11, 2016	978-4-0410-5536-6	November 27, 2018	978-1-64-212538-2
6. "Secret" (秘密, Himitsu); 7. "Inexperience" (未経験, Mi keiken); 8. "His Room" (彼の部屋, Kare no Heya); 9. "All You Can Eat" (宴, Utage); 10. "Co-ed Summer Camp" (男女合宿, Danjo gasshuku)
3	March 3, 2017	978-4-06-391062-9	December 25, 2018	978-1-64-212598-6
11. "A Night Alone Together" (ふたりきりの夜, Futari Kiri no Yoru); 12. "Anticipation" (期待, Kitai); 13. "Hot Body" (熱いカラダ, Atsui Karada); 14. "Begotten by Lust" (欲望の行方, Yokubō no Yukue); 15. "When I think of You" (君を想えば, Kimi o omoe ba)
4	July 14, 2017	978-4-06-391073-5	January 22, 2019	978-1-64-212664-8
16. "Connection" (重なるカラダ, Kasanaru karada); Extra Credit 1. "Guy Talk" (男子会, Danshi kai); 17. "Private Lessons" (プライベートレッスン, Puraibeito Ressun); 18. "Through Thick and Thin" (いつもそばに, Itsu mo soba ni); 19. "Better than Good" (気持ちいい以上, Kimochi iī ijō); Extra Credit 2. "A Boy for a Day" (男になってみた, Otoko ni natte mita)
5	November 16, 2017	978-4-06-510462-0	March 26, 2019	978-1-64-212697-6
20. "After the Kiss" (キスの後, Kisu no Ato); 21. "Queen Miyabi and the School Fair" (女王雅の文化祭, Joou Miyabi no Bunkasai); 22. "Rival" (ライバル, Raibaru); 23. "Kaneko-san's Confession" (金子さんの告白, Kaneko-san no Kokuhaku); Extra Credit 1. "Afternoon Spinoff" (アフタヌーン出張版, Afutanūn shutchō ban); Extra Credit 2. "Undressing" (脱衣, Datsui)
6	April 17, 2018	978-4-06-511476-6	April 23, 2019	978-1-64-212786-7
24. "Dressing Room Danger" (危険な試着室, Kiken na shichaku-shitsu); 25. "Trick or Treat" (トリック オア トリート, Torikku oa torīto); 26. "That Time I Got Reincarnated as a Bunny Girl" (異世界に転生したらどうぶつだった, Isekai ni tensei shitara dōbutsu datta); 27. "Naked Date" (裸のお付き合い, Hadaka no Otsukiai); Extra Credit. "Miyabi Foiled" (策士雅やぶれる, Sakushi Miyabi yabureru); Palcy Spinoff. "The Beginning of Uehara's Fun-Filled High School Days" (上原の楽しい高校生活のはじまり, Uehara no Tanoshii kōkō Seikatsu no Hajimari)
7	September 14, 2018	978-4-06-512895-4	May 21, 2019	978-1-64-212826-0
28. "Sleepless Night" (眠れない一夜, Nemure nai ichiya); 29. "All Alone" (ひとりぼっち, Hitori bocchi); 30. "Just This Once" (一度、大人の関係, Ichido, Otona no kankei); 31. "A Summer of Goodbyes" (さよならの夏, Sayonara no Natsu)
8	January 17, 2019	978-4-06-514351-3	June 25, 2019	978-1-64-212827-7
32. "Takumi Kijima's Summer Break" (木嶋拓海の夏休み, Kijima Takumi no Natsu Yasumi); 33. "Reunion" (再会, Saikai); 34. "Ao Packs on the Pounds" (青、肥ゆる。, Ao, koyuru.); 35. "Together in the Library" (図書室のふれあい, Tosho-Shitsu no Fureai); Last Lesson. "Ao Horie" (堀江 青, Horie Ao)

==== Ao-chan Can't Study!: Adult Arc ====
Ao-chan Can't Study!: Adult Arc (Japanese: 淫らな青ちゃんは勉強ができない オトナ編, Hepburn: Midara na Ao-chan wa Benkyō ga Dekinai Otona Hen; lit. "Lewd Ao-chan Can't Study: Adult Arc")

No.	Release date	ISBN
1	May 17, 2019	978-4-06-515755-8
2	October 17, 2019	978-4-06-517404-3
3	May 13, 2020	978-4-06-519496-6

=== Anime ===
An anime television series adaptation was announced on December 4, 2018. The series is animated by Silver Link and directed by Keisuke Inoue, with Michiko Yokote handled series composition, and Miwa Oshima designed the characters. It aired from April 6 to June 22, 2019, on the Animeism programming block on MBS, TBS, and BS-TBS. (Note: MBS and TBS listed the show at 26:10 on April 5, which is April 6, 2019 at 2:10 a.m.) Edoga Sullivan performed the series' opening theme song "Wonderful Wonder", while Spira Spica performed the series' ending theme song "Koi wa Miracle" (恋はミラクル). Sentai Filmworks has licensed the series for international regions, excluding Asia; an English dub was produced. In Southeast Asia and South Asia, Muse Communication streamed the series on its Muse Asia YouTube channel.

No.	Title (Note: All English titles are taken from Hidive.)	Directed by	Original release date
1	"Ao-chan Can't Enjoy Her Youth"; Transliteration: "Ao-chan wa seishun ga dekinai" (Japanese: 青ちゃんは青春ができない)	Keisuke Inoue	April 6, 2019
In a flashback, at school, Ao Horie introduces herself in class about the origin of her name and why Ao's father named her, which she regrets sharing in class. Now in high school, Takumi Kijima was commenting about Ao's good grades. She thinks both of them live in different worlds and quickly leaves the classroom to go home. The next day at school, the teacher asks Ao to see about Takumi's sprained ankle and gives her a new set of uniform for him to use. Ao went to see him but overheard a conversion with Masaki Uehara and he left the room. Ao talks to Takumi and gives him the uniform, while secretly, Hanasaki shows up and surprised Ao. She tries to stop him from doing things to her. This is until Takumi covers Ao with the uniform and he confessed to her.
2	"Ao-chan Can't Easily Decline"; Transliteration: "Ao-chan wa jōzu ni kotowarenai" (Japanese: 青ちゃんは上手に断れない)	Keisuke Inoue	April 13, 2019
At school, Ao was thinking about Takumi's confession. Takumi greeted Ao and was frightened by him. The next day, she wore a different uniform to school, which Masaki commented about it and Ao left the classroom embarrassed. Takumi went to see her and they skipped class to eat. Ao wanted to touch Takumi, while he was sleeping. But he thought she wanted to touch his hand. Then Takumi asked about if Ao accepted his confession. Ao shouts out that she is not familiar with being a couple yet. Takumi replies to Ao to plainly not reject his confession and think over it. Hanasaki asks Ao about Takumi and gave some advice, which Ao did not like about it. At school, Ao was trying to study. But she was reading one of Hanasaki's novels, disguised as a school book. She threw it to Takumi and he picked up the novel. Thinking that its his study book. Ao asks Takumi to study together and tried to retrieve the novel from him, which Ao thought he had. But Takumi had the school book and Ao had the novel instead and ran away.
3	"Ao-chan Can't Protect Her Lower Half"; Transliteration: "Ao-chan wa kahanshin ga mamorenai" (Japanese: 青ちゃんは下半身が守れない)	Yūya Horiuchi	April 20, 2019
On a school field trip, Ao walked into Takumi at the inn and some of her classmates asked about him. Ao goes to Takumi's room as him, Masaki and Shuhei Yonezuka, Takumi's friend went to the room. Takumi noticed the closet door was stuck and tried to close it. Masaki and Shuhei wanted drinks and Takumi stayed behind to get a futon from the closet. But Ao was hiding there. He starts to feel her head and embarrassed fell on top of him. When Takumi's friends and her classmates arrived. Ao wanted to leave and they went to a shrine to have a test of courage. She and Takumi were paired. On the way back leaving the shrine, Takumi noticed Ao's skirt was tucked halfway showing her underwear. Takumi tries to tell Ao about it, until he took his shirt off and tied a knot around Ao's waistband.
4	"Miyabi-chan Can't Be Beaten"; Transliteration: "Miyabi-chan wa maketakunai" (Japanese: 雅ちゃんは負けたくない)	Yūya Horiuchi	April 27, 2019
Ao had a nightmare about her name and woke up to Hanasaki wanting to give her a letter from someone. She opens the letter to find Takumi sleeping with a girl. At school, during a soccer practice match, Ao wanted to talk to Takumi and know who the girl in the picture was. But their classmates cheered on Takumi and he greeted them, they asked Takumi if Ao was his girlfriend. She denied it and heard about him going to a mixer. She ran away to a café. At the café, the girl from the picture stands in front of Ao and remembers her as Miyabi Takaoka. Takumi talked to Ao about the mixer and Miyabi. At the park, Hanasaki saw Takumi and Miyabi going on a date together and went to a haunted house. While Ao got lost with her father, when Takumi found her and escorted her out. At night, Takumi and Miyabi continued their date. Ao followed them to a love hotel.
5	"Ao-chan Can't Lead Virgins"; Transliteration: "Ao-chan wa dōtei o michibikenai" (Japanese: 青ちゃんは童貞を導けない)	Mamoru Enomoto	May 4, 2019
Ao saw Takumi and Miyabi went to a hotel, but she fainted. Takumi carried Ao to her room and woke up. He tried to tell her about what happened. That the hotel does not accept high school children and Miyabi ran away from Takumi. He tells Ao that he is a virgin and she thinks Takumi tells this to other girls he likes, but does not and left. The next day, at school, Takumi tries to avoid Ao, but Masaki asks her about Takumi's homework and try to finish it together. At the café, Takumi told Ao about a question he did not understand. It was one of Hanasaki's novels as a study book. They walked back home, Takumi wanted to know about Ao, if being a couple is their first time. His questioning frightened her and left to see Miyabi.
6	"Kijima Can't Wait Any Longer"; Transliteration: "Kijima-kun wa mō matenai" (Japanese: 木嶋くんはもう待てない)	Yūshi Ibe	May 11, 2019
At home, Hanasaki ran out of ideas to write into his novels. When Soichiro Yabe, his editor, and Ao decided to go to a festival to find some advice for Hanasaki's novels. At the festival, Ao became lost and saw Takumi and Miyabi working there. Soichiro found her and introduces himself as Hanasaki's friend from the university. (Keeping the secret that he is Hanasaki's editor.) Takumi thinks Soichiro is too close of a friend to Ao's family and Miyabi drags him back to work. She tried to tell Takumi to stop thinking about him being with Ao. Takumi found Ao during his break and asked about Soichiro. Meanwhile, he went to find her. Takumi took Ao away from Soichiro and told him, she will return home later. At the park, Takumi still awaits Ao's confession.
7	"Ao-chan Can Handle the Sea"; Transliteration: "Ao-chan wa umi de mo kamawanai" (Japanese: 青ちゃんは海でもかまわない)	Yūshi Ibe	May 18, 2019
At school, Ao took a practice entrance exam for universities. But her grades to the exam was a failing grade. She decided to study by the beach as Takumi, Miyabi, and Masaki show up. Ao tried to decline Takumi's advice to have fun before her study group begins later. Miyabi told Ao that she can borrow a swimsuit from the store at her new job. Ao and Takumi went ahead to relax, while Miyabi and Masaki stayed behind wondering about Ao and Takumi is doing next. Ao wanted to leave the beach, but Takumi asks her to the lifebelt and swim back the shore. Thinking that he wanted to be with her longer and reminded her, that Ao has a study group to attend soon. She thought Takumi wanted to do something else before going there. Ao got mad at him about it, before a bikini comes off when Miyabi used a scissors to cut the bottom line.
8	"Kijima-kun Lacks Stamina"; Transliteration: "Kijima-kun wa seiryoku ga tarinai" (Japanese: 木嶋くんは精力が足りない)	Mamoru Enomoto	May 25, 2019
At night, Ao was thinking about what happen at the beach. When a couple of boys passed by and saw Ao was punching the light pole. Ao arrived home to study, but she had a text message from Takumi about his soccer club having a practice match. Ao texted him back about her making food for Takumi. The next morning, she tried to make different meals for him. But an eel escaped and was attached to Hanasaki as he got the newspaper. For revenge, he adds an ingredient in the eel's bowl. While Ao took a break and Soichiro made coffee. At the park, Takumi's team lost and felt depressed as Ao wanted to give him food to cheer up. When their classmates left for karaoke. After Takumi ate the food, he was acting strange and touched Ao. He stopped and Ao told him to stop confessing to her.
9	"Ao-chan Needs More Than Fantasies"; Transliteration: "Ao-chan wa mōsō ja tarinai" (Japanese: 青ちゃんは妄想じゃ足りない)	Yūya Horiuchi	June 1, 2019
At home, Ao regrets rejecting Takumi and she was taking to a mannequin. Which surprised her, and it was brought by Hanasaki for Ao to have. At school, Ao felt strange being in the classroom. Until, Masaki asked about Takumi being mad. She arrived home to study and Soichiro asked if Ao rejected Takumi, but she could not stop saying his name. He talked to Hanasaki about Ao being depressed. Later, Ao returned to her room, while Soichiro stopped tutoring her and went outside of the house. Which he saw Takumi and wanted to see Ao. Takumi talked to her about leaving her alone at school. As Takumi was leaving, Ao wanted him to stay and he kissed her forehead. Before Takumi left, he asked Ao to go studying together. Thinking that she thought Takumi wanted to date her instead.
10	"Dad Can't Offer Support"; Transliteration: "Otōsan wa ōen dekinai" (Japanese: お父さんは応援できない)	Yūya Horiuchi	June 8, 2019
At school, Ao's class was thinking of what event they're doing for the school sports festival. She overheard about Takumi taking part in the festival. Ao went home and wanted to be at the festival too, but Hanasaki wanted to be there too. She tries to tell him not to show up, because every school festival Ao participated in, it ends in a fiasco. Due to Hanasaki giving his novels to everyone. They fought and did not talk to each other until the festival began. At the festival, Takumi talked to Ao and she was worried about her father. Ao went to participate in an event, but she stepped on Hanasaki's back and he wanted to support her. At the start of the event, Ao ran and Hanasaki shouted out what was her cup size. Later, she asked him not to show up at school.
11	"Ao-chan Can't Wear Silky Panties"; Transliteration: "Ao-chan wa tsurutsuru pantsu ga hakenai" (Japanese: 青ちゃんはツルツルパンツがはけない)	Yūshi Ibe	June 15, 2019
At school, Takumi asked Ao to study at his apartment on the weekend. At night, Ao looked through her phone and bought underwear. The package arrived and Hanasaki wanted to get it, but Ao rushed to the door to grab the package. Hanasaki asked her what was inside it, she told him it is for studying. Later, Ao arrived at Takumi's apartment to study. They studied until Ao asked a math question, while Takumi did not get it. He asked Ao a question about who scores better on the quiz and she thought he wanted to dare her. But she was thinking of dirty thoughts instead. Takumi thought Ao had an idea and it was about making him bento again. She replied back, but she had a stomachache and stayed at home. Which she missed the school quiz.
12	"Ao-chan Can't Study"; Transliteration: "Ao-chan wa Benkyō ga Dekinai" (Japanese: 青ちゃんは勉強ができない)	Keisuke Inoue	June 22, 2019
Ao went to an ice cream shop and visited Miyabi at her job. She asked about what is a kiss and Miyabi almost demonstrated it in front of Ao, while everyone was looking. Meanwhile, Masaki asked Takumi about Ao and their relationship. But she is more focused on studying than having fun. At school, Ao was being strange around Takumi, until she told him about Miyabi wondering if they kissed yet and he kissed Ao. At home, Ao made too much tempura for Hanasaki and Soichiro wondered about her being strange. At school, everyone knew about Takumi kissing Ao, and embarrassed, she left the classroom. Takumi went to talk to Masaki and Shuhei, about him and Ao. Later, he went to the bookstore to see Ao and wanted go to the train station together. But along the way going there, he kissed Ao and it made her embarrassed again.

== See also ==
- We're New at This, another manga series by Ren Kawahara
