= We're New at This =

Japanese manga series

- First tankōbon volume cover

未熟なふたりでございますが (Mijuku na Futari de Gozaimasu ga)
- Genre: Romantic comedy; Slice of life
- Manga
- Written by: Ren Kawahara
- Published by: Kodansha
- English publisher: NA: Kodansha USA
- Imprint: Morning KC
- Magazine: Comic Days
- Original run: March 9, 2018 – June 21, 2024
- Volumes: 18

We're New at This (未熟なふたりでございますが, Mijuku na Futari de Gozaimasu ga) is a Japanese manga series written and illustrated by Ren Kawahara. It was serialized on Kodansha's Comic Days manga website from March 2018 to June 2024.

== Synopsis ==
The series is centered around the marriage between Ikuma Saeki and his childhood friend Sumika. Ikuma and Sumika are finally married after years of pining. However, the two are inexperienced in getting physical with each other and continue to have struggles while married.

== Publication ==
Written and illustrated by Ren Kawahara, We're New at This was serialized on Kodansha's Comic Days manga website from March 9, 2018, to June 21, 2024. Its chapters were collected into eighteen tankōbon volumes from August 8, 2018, to August 9, 2024.

The series is licensed digitally in English by Kodansha USA.

| No. | Original release date | Original ISBN | North American release date | North American ISBN |
|---|---|---|---|---|
| 1 | August 8, 2018 | 978-4-06-512274-7 | December 29, 2020 | 978-1-64-659878-6 |
1. "Wedding Night Do-Over"; 2. "A New Wife's Come-Ons"; 3. "The Signal"; 4. "Laid-back Trip"; 5. "Reserved Bath"; 6. "Girls' Talk in the Infirmary"; 7. "Did I Marry a Cat"; 8. "Infidelity"
| 2 | November 14, 2018 | 978-4-06-513546-4 | January 19, 2021 | 978-1-64-659918-9 |
9. "Engrave It Into Your Body"; 10. "High School Girls"; 11. "A Husband's Secret"; 12. "Night of the Eternal View"; 13. "Selfish Sex"; 14. "Your Warmth"; 15. "Enticing Fragrance"; 16. "My Wife's So Cool It Hurts"; 17. "Training for the Deed"; 10.5. "Enshrouded in Greatness"
| 3 | March 13, 2019 | 978-4-06-514751-1 | February 16, 2021 | 978-1-64-659963-9 |
18. "Early Morning Date"; 19. "Husband and Wife Squabble"; 20. "Caught in the Rain"; 21. "Behind Closed Doors"; Bonus: Young Magazine Guest Edition; 22. "Can't Resist"; 23. "To a Special Someone"; 24. "Misunderstanding"; 25. "Even Though You Are a Teacher"; 23.5. "When the Husband's Away"
| 4 | August 8, 2019 | 978-4-06-516601-7; 978-4-06-517054-0 (SE) | March 16, 2021 | 978-1-63-699007-1 |
26. "The Infirmary, After Dark"; 27. "Putting in the Work"; 28. "I Want to Show Them"; 29. "Failure"; 30. "I Want to Cry"; 31. "Biggest Stroke of Luck in My Life"; 32. "Beyond the First Night"; 33. "The Husband's Insistence"; 28.5. "Massage"
| 5 | December 11, 2019 | 978-4-06-517993-2 | April 20, 2021 | 978-1-63-699053-8 |
35. "Captivating Body"; 36. "Putting It All Out There"; 37. "Birthday"; 38. "Present"; 39. "Husband Who Won't Do It"; 40. "Nursing Her Back to Health"; 41. "Being Prepared"; 42. "Eat, Drink, and Make Merry"; 43. "The Wife Wants It"
| 6 | May 13, 2020 | 978-4-06-519369-3 | May 18, 2021 | 978-1-63-699100-9 |
44. "Can't Wait Any Longer"; 45. "In Order to Stay Together"; 46. "Their Flushed Bodies"; 47. "Fashion Show"; 48. "I Want Her for Myself"; 49. "Wife's Father"; 50. "The Morning After"; 51. "Plunder"; Bonus: Morning Guest Edition
| 7 | September 9, 2020 | 978-4-06-520614-0 | June 15, 2021 | 978-1-63-699155-9 |
52. "As Many Times as It Takes"; 53. "Let's Play at Home"; 54. "I Want to Be Alone"; 55. "When the Husband Is Asleep"; 56. "The Far-Off Future"; 57. "When I Was Alone"; 58. "The Stand-Alone House of His Dreams"; 59. "To Their New Home"; 60. "Post-Move Poverty"
| 8 | January 13, 2021 | 978-4-06-521856-3 | July 20, 2021 | 978-1-63-699234-1 |
61. "The Wife Watches Over"; 62. "Uneven Path"; 63. "Class Reunion"; 64. "A Relaxing Date"; 65. "Changes at Their New Home"; 66. "Answering a Confession of Love"; 67. "Costume Battle"; 68. "Friend's Girlfriend"
| 9 | June 9, 2021 | 978-4-06-523489-1 | October 19, 2021 | 978-1-63-699421-5 |
69. "Their Differences"; 70. "Solution"; 71. "Alone Time"; 72. "Masquerade Party"; 73. "I've Been Watching You Forever"; 74. "New Year's Eve"; 75. "Happy New Year"; 76. "New Year's Resolutions"; Special chapter: "What Prompted His Confession"
| 10 | October 21, 2021 | 978-4-06-525019-8 | March 1, 2022 | 978-1-63-699640-0 |
77. "New Year's with Mom"; 78. "The Tropics in Your Own House"; 79. "Commence Play"; 80. "Advice"; 81. "I'll Be Your Ally"; 82. "Right in His Strike Zone"; 83. "Sumika Becomes a TV Host"; Special chapter: "Sumika and Mei-chan"
| 11 | March 23, 2022 | 978-4-06-527008-0 | September 20, 2022 | 978-1-63-699421-5 |
84. "The Wife's Birthday"; 85. "Closed Online Community Husband"; 86. "Unbridled Growth"; 87. "The Husband's Slip of the Tongue"; 88. "How to Make Amends"; 89. "Stay on My Side"; 90. "The Mood Back Then"; 91. "Seniors and Juniors"
| 12 | August 23, 2022 | 978-4-06-528632-6 | February 28, 2023 | 978-1-68-491715-0 |
92. "Becoming a Father"; 93. "Because We're Married"; 94. "Flower-Viewing Date"; 95. "Fun at the Love Hotel"; 96. "The Hobbyless Wife"; 97. "Easily Bored Husband"; 98. "New Underwear"; 99. "Punishment"
| 13 | December 14, 2022 | 978-4-06-529977-7 | May 16, 2023 | 978-1-68-491939-0 |
100. "Conquest"; 101. "Radiance"; 102. "Value Your Health"; 103. "The Husband's Dislikes"; 104. "Part-Time Fantasies"; 105. "Yukata Date"; 106. "To The North"; 107. "Sapporo Date 1"
| 14 | April 12, 2023 | 978-4-06-531270-4 | September 19, 2023 | 979-8-88-933149-0 |
108. "Sapporo Date 2"; 109. "Hakodate Date 1"; 110. "Hakodate Date 2"; 111. "After the Trip"; 112. "Shaving Play"; 113. "Life with a Child"; 114. "Sumika's Weakness"; 115. "Acknowledging It"
| 15 | August 8, 2023 | 978-4-06-532540-7 | January 16, 2024 | 979-8-88-933329-6 |
116. "Love Me Like in Comics"; 117. "A Perfect Escort"; 118. "I Want Excitement"; 119. "One-Upmanship"; 120. "I'm in Love with Someone Else"; 121. "Interested in Other People's Sex"; 122. "Route Unknown"; 123. "To Our Future"; Special chapter: "Spring Worries"
| 16 | December 13, 2023 | 978-4-06-532540-7 | May 14, 2024 | 979-8-88-933489-7 |
124. "Ikuma Goes Viral"; 125. "I Want to Treat You Right"; 126. "Always Be Prepared"; 127. "Preparing for the Arrival"; 128. "Things We Can Do Together"; 129. "New Friends"; 130. "Don't You Get Tired?"; 131. "Can I Really Be One?"
| 17 | April 10, 2024 | 978-4-06-535120-8 | September 17, 2024 | 979-8-89-478013-9 |
132. "Happy News"; 133. "What Kind of Father"; 134. "Ways to Support"; 135. "Christmas at Home"; 136. "Name Origin"; 137. "Maternity Blues"; 138. "New Encounters"; 139. "Onward to the Birth!!"
| 18 | August 9, 2024 | 978-4-06-536387-4 | January 14, 2025 | 979-8-89-478313-0 |
140. "The Saeki Twins"; 141. "Compromise"; 142. "Wedding Night Do-Over Again"; 143. "Dark Past"; 144. "Popular Mother"; 145. "Four-Person Meeting"; 146. "A Husband and Wife's Relationship"; 147. "We're New at This"

== See also ==
- Ao-chan Can't Study!, another manga series by Ren Kawahara
