= Wink (album) =

Studio album by Chai
- Released: May 21, 2021
- Studios: Endhits Studio Inc, Tokyo; Foftoo Sound Labs, Tokyo; Sound Arts, Tokyo; Strange Weather, New York City
- Genres: Dance-punk; garage punk; hip hop; pop; pop rock; R&B
- Length: 34:53
- Labels: Sub Pop; Otemayon
- Producers: Dar Ishikawa; Mndsgn; YMCK

Chai chronology
Punk (2019)	Wink (2021)	Chai (2023)

Singles from Wink
- 1. "Donuts Mind If I Do" Released: October 2, 2020; 2. "Action" Released: January 19, 2021; 3. "Maybe Chocolate Chips" Released: February 24, 2021; 4. "Nobody Knows We Are Fun" Released: April 1, 2021; 5. "Ping Pong!" Released: April 28, 2021

Wink is the third studio album by Japanese rock quartet Chai, released on May 21, 2021. It is their first record on Sub Pop, following two albums on the now-defunct Burger Records.

Wink was greeted with critical applause upon its release, with praise going to its contemplative nature and the quartet's success at a new musical palette, which brought in funk, hip hop and R&B sounds.

== Composition ==
Wink has been noted for adding hip hop and R&B alongside the quartet's signature dance-punk and pop rock. Many publications echoed this positively, with many finding funk, house, pop and soul stylings woven throughout as well.

It has been noted as "all analogue R&B and garage punk with a rap verse".

== Critical reception ==
Professional ratings
Aggregate scores
Source	Rating
AnyDecentMusic?	7.6/10
Metacritic	80/100
Review scores
Source	Rating
AllMusic	4/5 stars
Beats Per Minute	79%
DIY	3.5/5 stars
Exclaim!	8/10
Gigwise	9/10
The Line of Best Fit	8/10
Our Culture Mag	3.5/5 stars
Paste	7.8/10
Pitchfork	7.5/10
The Skinny	4/5 stars

Wink received acclaim from music critics. On Metacritic, it has received a score of 80 out of 100, based on 11 reviews, indicating "generally favorable reviews".

Tara Joshi for The Quietus applauded it as their "most comforting listen to date". Clare Martin for Paste called it "fun and filling" and noted the quartet made "every moment feel like a treat". The album was placed at number 47 in The Guardian's list of the 50 best albums of 2021, with Laura Snapes describing it as "blissed-out, dreamy synth-pop".

== Track listing ==
Wink track listing
No.	Title	Length
1.	"Donuts Mind If I Do"	3:48
2.	"Maybe Chocolate Chips" (featuring Ric Wilson)	2:53
3.	"Action"	3:23
4.	"End"	2:15
5.	"Ping Pong!" (featuring YMCK)	3:16
6.	"Nobody Knows We Are Fun"	3:01
7.	"It's Vitamin C"	2:49
8.	"In Pink" (featuring Mndsgn)	3:45
9.	"Karaage"	3:11
10.	"Miracle"	2:37
11.	"Wish Upon a Star"	2:47
12.	"Salty"	1:08
Total length:		34:53

== Personnel ==
Chai

- Mana – vocals, keyboards
- Kana – vocals, guitar
- Yuuki – bass, choir/chorus
- Yuna – drums, choir/chorus
