= Hottaraka Series =

- 2016 wide-release artwork

EP by Chai
- Released: August 22, 2015
- Recorded: 2015
- Genres: Rock; punk rock; alternative rock; dance
- Length: 13:54
- Language: Japanese
- Labels: You Peace; Grand Pacific Work
- Producer: Chai

Chai chronology
Hottaraka Series (2015)	Homegoro Series (2017)

Hottaraka Series (Japanese: ほったらかシリーズ; "Irresponsible Series") is the debut extended play by Japanese band Chai, released on August 22, 2015. Originally a self-released album, it was later given a global digital release and a Japan-wide release in 2016. The extended play's leading promotional track "Gyaranboo" was a success in the United Kingdom, where it reached number 36 on Spotify's UK top 50 chart, without any promotion from the band.

== Background and development ==
Chai was formed in 2012 in Nagoya, Aichi Prefecture, by twins Mana and Kana alongside Yuna and Yuuki. Mana, Kana, Yuna are all from Nagoya, and were in the same class at high school. At first, Chai performed mostly around Nagoya and the surrounding prefectures. The band self-published the singles "Chai" (2013), "Kōsui (My Name Is Chai)" (2013) and "Chūburarin" (2014), and held a tour of central Japan in the summer holidays. By 2015, the band had started to perform more around the Tokyo area. The band decided to distance themselves from the music found on their earlier singles, due to the different musical direction to Hottaraka Series, which the band found too feminine and cute in retrospect.

== Writing and production ==
All of the songs on the album were composed by Mana, with Yuuki writing most of the lyrics, except for "Pichiku Pachiku Cuchiku" which had lyrics co-written by both Mana and Yuuki. "Meshimase Coffee" acts as a prologue to the extended play. "Gyaranboo" is a song centered around rhymes, that was inspired by Mana and Kana's father's abdominal hair (known colloquially in Japanese as gyarandū (ギャランドゥー)). "Nandamin to Total Care" is a song where the members profess their love for Mondahmin, a brand of mouth wash by Japanese company Earth Corporation. The title blends Mondahmin's brand name with a fanciful term Nanda-minzoku (ナンダ民族; "The What People"), which Yuuki explains as people who can only say "what". "Total Care" is a marketing phrase associated with a similar product, Listerine. "Futae Center" is a song about a fictional factory, and "Pichiku Pachiku Cuchiku" was inspired by common misunderstandings women such as the members of Chai have.

== Promotion and release ==
Hottaraka Series was initially released exclusively to the website Ototoy, and as a tour exclusive CD. Chai held an album release tour called Chai no Chaikovskip Tour: Menjá Zovút Pi (CHAIのチャイコフスキップツアー ～Меня зовут「ぴ」～), featuring 10 dates mostly around Nagoya and the Tokyo area from August 22 to November 3.

"Gyaranboo" served as the leading promotional track from the album. Three music videos shot through the iPhone application Triller, starting with "Gyaranboo" in November 2015. This was the first music video produced through the application that was officially released by a band as a music video. "Nandamin to Total Care"'s music video was released in March 2016, and was shot as an ode to the mouth wash Mondahmin. The video has since been removed from YouTube.

Hottaraka Series was released globally in August 2016 to digital music stores and streaming services. During which, "Pichiku Pachiku Cuchiku" was promoted by the band, who created their third and final Triller self-produced music video for the song. During this global release, "Gyaranboo" reached number 36 on Spotify's UK top 50 chart, without any promotion from the band. To tie in with the wide digital release, a second Japanese tour was announced to promote Hottaraka Series: Anmari Tour ni Nattenai, Zenkoku Hottaraka Series Tour (あんまりツアーになってない、全国ほったらかシリーズツアー) held from July to September.

The album was given a wide release in Japan on December 7, which was promoted by a series of concerts called Road to the Grammy's (“ロード・ツー・ダ・GRAMMYs”), held in Tokyo in November, and given a second season in February 2016, with performances in Tokyo and Osaka. Chai also performed at the Ki/oon Music-organised music event Slash in November 2015.

== Critical reception ==
CDJournal reviewers described the EP as "a succession of strange and chaotic songs, combining jazz and dance beat influences with an inconsistent progression, junk-like ensemble and coquettish mysterious vocals. The EP's appeal comes from its indescribable power and innocent ideas." Moe Tanaka of Rooftop the "addictive bass mixed with Mana and Kana's twin vocals" and the strong drums. She praised the band's "strong visuals", likening it to fusion cuisine. Hottaraka Series received praise from Japanese musicians such as Charan-Po-Rantan, Blue Encount and Akkogorilla.

== Track listing ==
Source for official romanzation:

All lyrics are written by Yuuki, except where noted; all music is composed by Mana.

No.	Title	Lyrics	Length
1.	"Meshimase Coffee" (召しませコーフィー, "Have Some Coffee")		2:43
2.	"Gyaranboo" (ぎゃらんぶー Gyaranbū)		2:54
3.	"Nandamin to Total Care" (ナンダミン to トータルケア Nandamin tu Tōtaru Kea)	Mana	2:50
4.	"Futae Center" (二重センター, "Double Center")		2:38
5.	"Pichiku Pachiku Cuchiku" (ぴーちくぱーちくきゅーちく Pīchiku Pāchiku Kyūchiku)	Mana; Yuuki	2:47
Total length:			13:54

== Release history ==
Region	Date	Format	Distributing Label	Catalogue codes
Japan	August 22, 2015	High resolution digital download, CD (tour exclusive)	You Peace	CHAIEP-0001
Worldwide	August 24, 2016	digital download, streaming	Grand Pacific Work	
Japan	December 7, 2016	CD	Grand Pacific Work	GPWC-0001
South Korea	December 15, 2017	Digital download	Sony Music Entertainment Japan	
