= Chai (band) =

Japanese rock band

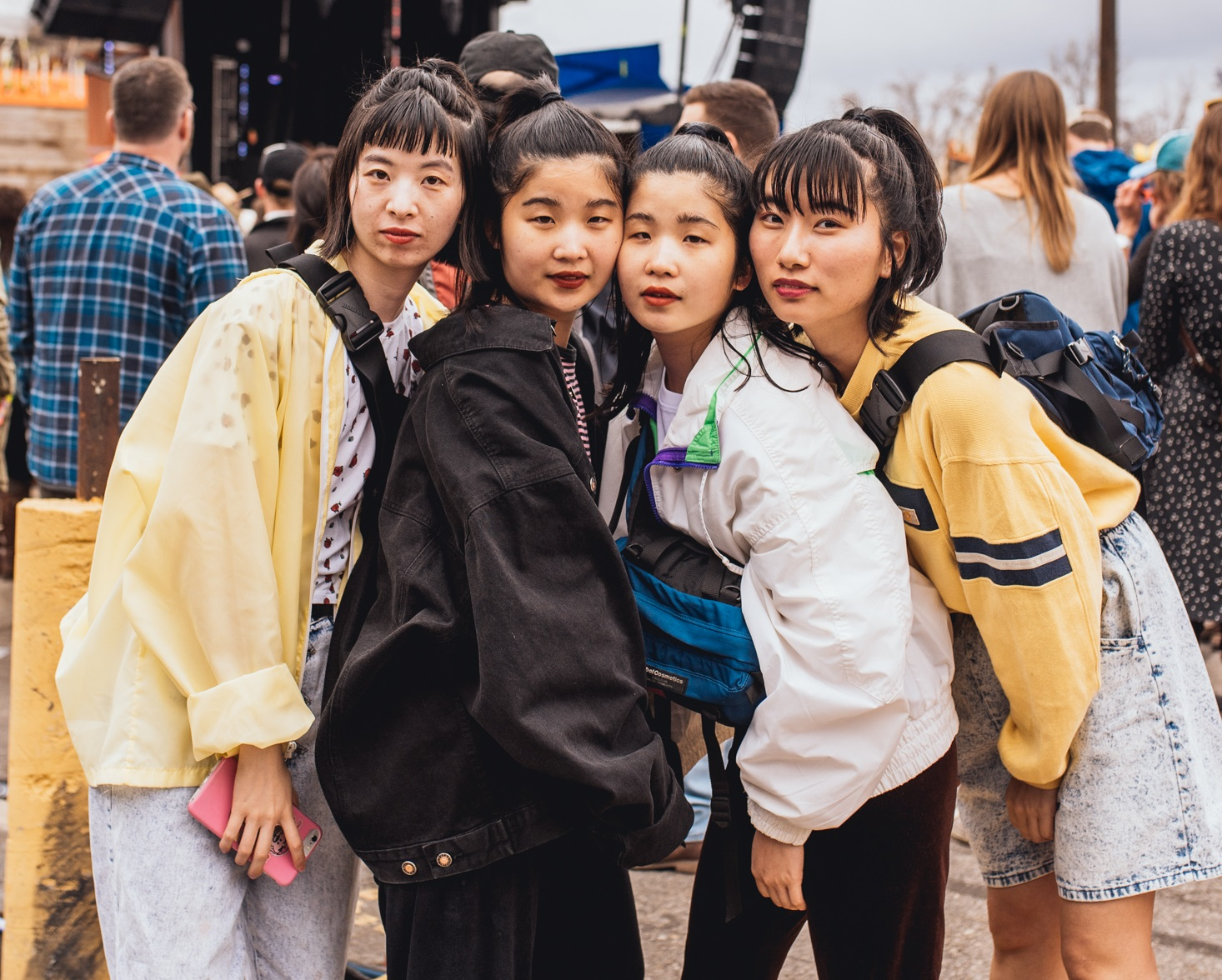
- Chai in 2019. From left to right: Yuuki, Mana, Kana, and Yuna.

Background information
- Origin: Nagoya, Japan
- Genres: Experimental pop; indie dance; disco-punk
- Years active: 2012–2024
- Labels: Otemoyan, Sony Music, Burger, Heavenly, Sub Pop
- Members: Mana; Kana; Yuuki; Yuna
- Website: chai-band.com

Chai was a Japanese pop band from Nagoya. The group consisted of four members: Mana, Kana, Yuuki and Yuna. Formed in 2012, the band released their debut studio album, Pink, in 2017. They announced their breakup in 2024.

Chai was produced and managed domestically by Jisedai and managed internationally by Antinos Management America, both subsidiaries of their label, Sony Music Entertainment Japan.

== Biography ==
Chai was formed in 2012 in Nagoya, Aichi Prefecture, by twin sisters Mana and Kana, alongside Yuna and Yuuki. Mana, Kana, and Yuna are all from Nagoya, and were in the same class at high school. The three were members of the light music club at their high school, performing covers of musicians such as Tokyo Jihen and Aiko. Yuna introduced the other band members to Japanese music that did not easily fit into the traditional definition of "J-Pop", such as the band Cero or Kimyō Reitaro.

After the members graduated and went to university, Mana became friends with Yuuki (originally from Gifu Prefecture, who had moved to Nagoya), and asked the four friends to form a band. The band's name comes from Russian tea (known as chai). Kana drank the tea with jam with her Russian literature professor at a Russian restaurant, which she thought was cute.

At first, Chai performed mostly around Aichi Prefecture but eventually moved to playing venues around Tokyo. The band started releasing singles independently in 2013 and held a tour of central Japan in the summer holidays. Their first large concert was performed at Zepp Nagoya, when the band were finalists in a college band competition.

The band's debut extended play Hottaraka Series was released in August 2015, exclusively at digital retailer Ototoy and as a tour exclusive CD. In August 2016, the EP was released to streaming services globally, with the song "Gyaranboo" reaching number 36 on Spotify's UK top 50 chart.

The band moved to Tokyo in 2016 in order to focus on becoming full-time musicians. In October, Chai was signed to Sony Music Japan after winning a competition in order to find acts to perform at Japan Nite at the SXSW festival in Austin. In December, Hottaraka Series was given a nationwide release. After their US SXSW tour in March 2017, the band released their second EP, Homegoro Series, distributed through Otemoyan Record, a record label imprint founded by Chai.

Chai released their debut studio album Pink in October 2017, reaching number 41 on Oricon's albums chart (the fourth highest selling independent release on the week). Pink was well received by critics, being chosen as one of the 10 finalists at the 2018 CD Shop Awards by record store staff from across Japan. In February, Pink was given a US release by Burger Records, who signed Chai after being impressed by their music video for "Boyz Seco Men".

Chai decided early in their career to pursue music globally, and they considered it strange that many Japanese musical acts only focused on selling music domestically. The band completed their second tour of the US in March. In the UK, Chai was signed to Heavenly Recordings and toured the country in October as a support act for Superorganism. In February 2019, the band released their second studio album Punk.

The band was signed to US indie label Sub Pop in October 2020. In 2020, Chai collaborated with Gorillaz and JPEGMafia on "MLS," a track on the Gorillaz album Song Machine, Season One: Strange Timez. Gorillaz frontman Damon Albarn discovered Chai after a member of the band's string section saw the band play in London. In 2021, they collaborated with Duran Duran on their single "More Joy!".

In January 2022, the band signed a contract with Sony Music Japan International, releasing the theme song to the NHK General TV drama Koisenu Futari in the same month.

Chai announced in January 2024 that they would disband following their next Japanese tour, which ended that March. The members said they plan to "continue our journey of self-love... and to continue to fulfill our own personal visions".

== Artistry and influences ==
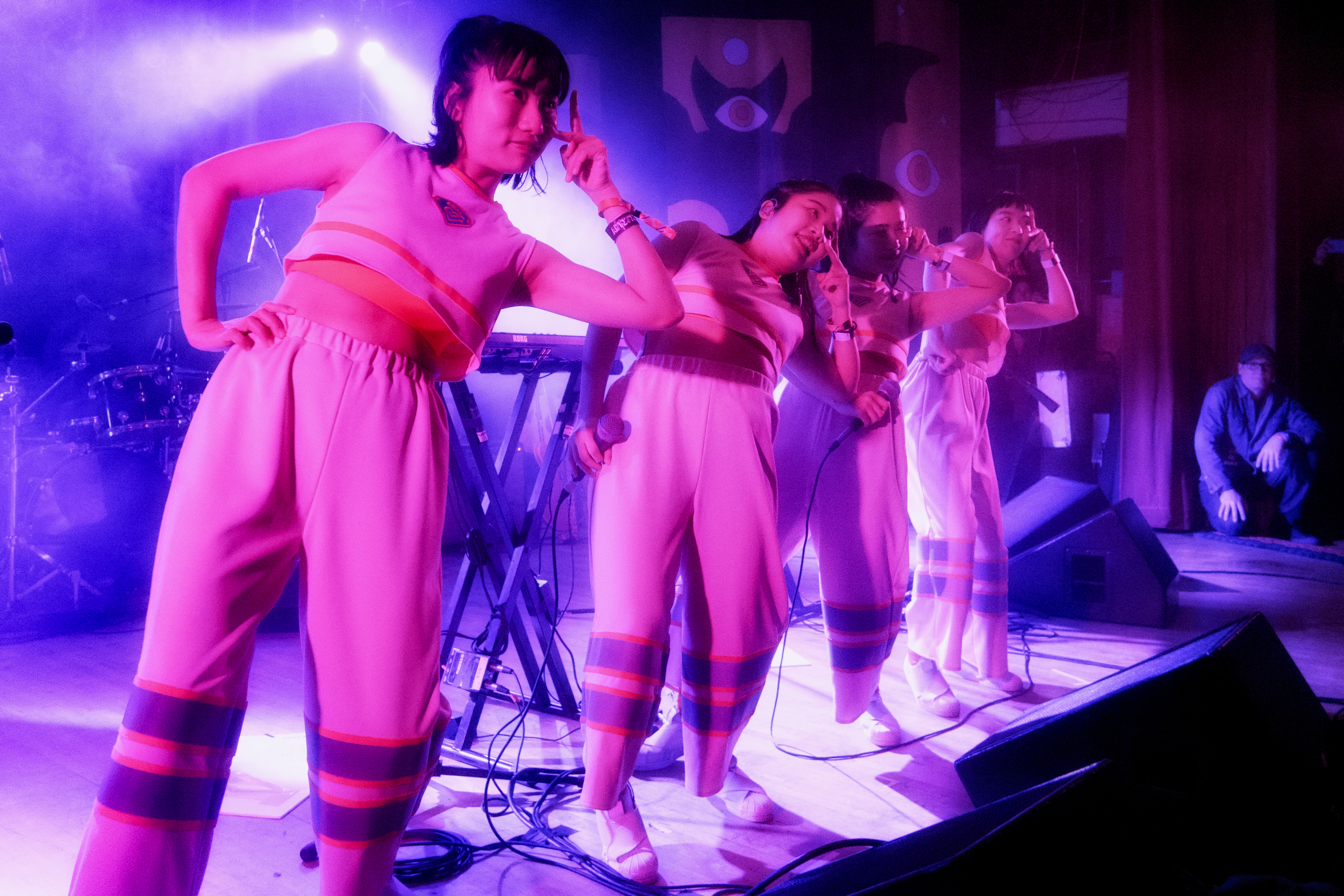
Chai performing at the Treefort Music Fest in 2019

Mana is the primary vocalist for the group, while the other members sing back up vocals. Mana plays the keyboards, Kana the guitar, while Yuna and Yuuki are the band's drummer and bassist respectively. For most songs, Mana and Kana compose the songs together using the voice memo app on their phones, while Mana sings and Kana composes on the guitar. Yuuki writes the lyrics, and all members create the arrangements for each song.

The band describes themselves as a new exciting onna-band (ニュー・エキサイト・オンナバンド; "new exciting woman band") or "NEO". They aim to redefine the definition of kawaii ("cute") as "neo kawaii", feeling that everyone around them was striving for a narrow definition of cute. They believe that everyone is cute in their own way, and wanted to express this through their music. As a theme of the band, the members of Chai decided to wear pink. They felt that actively choosing to do this was liberating, as they did not believe that the color suited them naturally. The band uses psychological complexes as inspiration for their music.

Japanese band Tokyo Jihen's Variety (2007) was an early influence for their music, inspiring them to make sure that every song on a release is distinct. The band lists Basement Jaxx, Jamiroquai, Gorillaz, and CSS as some of their major influences. On Pink, Chai drew influence from The Chemical Brothers, and electronic groups such as Chvrches and Justice. Yuna was inspired to become a drummer by Katchan from the Okinawan pop/rap group Orange Range.

== Discography ==
=== Studio albums ===
List of albums, with selected chart positions
Title	Album details	Peak positions	
Title	Album details	JPN Oricon	JPN Billboard (Note: Sources for chart positions are as follows: Pink, Wagamamania, Punk, Wink, Chai.)
Pink	Released: October 25, 2017; Label: Otemoyan Record, Burger Records, Heavenly Recordings; Formats: CD, digital download, LP record, cassette, online streaming	41	45
Punk	Released: February 13, 2019; Label: Otemoyan Record, Burger Records, Heavenly Recordings; Formats: CD, digital download, LP, cassette, streaming	50	72
Wink	Released: May 21, 2021; Label: Sub Pop, Otemoyan Record; Formats: CD, digital download, LP, cassette, streaming	92	82
Chai	Released: September 22, 2023; Label: Sub Pop, Otemoyan Record; Formats: CD, digital download, LP, cassette, streaming	—	96

=== Extended plays ===
List of extended plays, with selected chart positions
Title	Album details	Peak positions	
Title	Album details	JPN Oricon	JPN Billboard
Hottaraka Series (ほったらかシリーズ; "Irresponsible Series")	Released: August 22, 2015; Label: You Peace, Grand Pacific Work; Formats: CD, digital download	—	—
Homegoro Series (ほめごろシリーズ; "Backhanded Compliment Series")	Released: April 26, 2017; Label: Otemoyan Record; Formats: CD, digital download	—	—
Wagama-mania (わがまマニア; "Selfish Mania")	Released: May 9, 2018; Label: Otemoyan Record, Burger Records; Formats: CD, digital download, LP, cassette, streaming	33	43
"—" denotes items which were ineligible to chart.

=== Singles ===
List of singles, with selected chart positions
Title	Year	Peak chart positions	Album
Title	Year	JPN Oricon	Album
"Chai"	2013	—	Non-album singles
"Kōsui (My Name Is Chai)" (香水〜My name is CHAI〜; "Perfume")	2013	—	Non-album singles
"Chūburarin" (ちゅーぶらりん; "Dangling")	2014	—	Non-album singles
"Sound & Stomach"	2017	—	Homegoro Series
"Boyz Seco Men" (ボーイズ・セコ・メン)	2017	—	Homegoro Series
"N.E.O."	2017	135	Pink
"Sayonara Complex"	2017	135	Pink
"Great Job"	2018	62	Punk
"Wintime" (ウィンタイム)	2018	62	Punk
"Choose Go!"	2019	126	Punk
"Future" (フューチャー)	2019	126	Wagama-mania / Punk
"No More Cake"	2020	—	Non-album singles
"Ready Cheeky Pretty"	2020	—	Non-album singles
"Keep On Rocking"	2020	—	Non-album singles
"United Girls Rock'n'Roll Club" (Chai / Hinds)	2020	—	Non-album singles
"Donuts Mind If I Do"	2020	153	Wink
"Plastic Love"	2020	153	Non-album single
"Action"	2021	—	Wink
"Maybe Chocolate Chips" (チョコチップかもね, Chokochippu kamo ne) (featuring Ric Wilson)	2021	—	Wink
"Nobody Knows We Are Fun"	2021	—	Wink
"Ping Pong!" (featuring YMCK)	2021	—	Wink
"Miniskirt"	2021	—	Non-album singles
"Whole" (まるごと, Marugoto)	2022	—	Non-album singles
"—" denotes items that were ineligible to chart on Oricon singles chart, or items that did not chart.

==== Featured singles ====
List of singles, with selected chart positions
Title	Year	Album
"More Joy!" (Duran Duran featuring Chai)	2021	Future Past

==== Promotional singles ====
List of singles, with selected chart positions
Title	Year	Peak chart positions	Album
Title	Year	JPN Oricon	Album
"Gyaranboo" (ぎゃらんぶー)	2015	—	Hottaraka Series
"Pichiku Pachiku Cuchiku" (ぴーちくぱーちくきゅーちく)	2016	—	Hottaraka Series
"Horechatta" (ほれちゃった; "Fell in Love")	2017	—	Pink
"I'm Me" (アイム・ミー)	2018	—	Wagama-mania
"Center of the Face!"	2018	—	Wagama-mania
"Let's! Gonjirō" (レッツ！ゴンじろー) (Note: Split single with Demon Kakka, for the anime Kedama no Gonjiro.)	2019	136	Non-album singles
"Theme of Tenkorin" (てんこりんのテーマ, Tenkorin no Tēma) (Note: Theme song for the anime Teach Me, Hokusai!)	2021	—	Non-album singles
"Let's Love" (愛そうぜ！, Ai Sō ze!) (Note: Theme song for the anime Dinosaur Biyori.)	2021	—	Non-album singles
"In Pink" (featuring Mndsgn)	2021	—	Wink
"—" denotes items that were ineligible to chart on Oricon singles chart, or items that did not chart.

=== Guest appearances ===
The following songs are not singles or promotional singles and have not appeared on an album by Chai.

Title	Year	Other artists	Album
"Make Up! Make Up!"	2018	—N/a	Chatmonchy Tribute: I Love Chatmonchy
"Summer Time Chill Out" (with Mana & Kana)	2018	Yap!!!	Bichrome
"Follow the Big Wave" (with Mana, Kana & Yuna)	2018	Rei	Rei
"MLS"	2020	Gorillaz, JPEGMAFIA	Song Machine, Season One: Strange Timez (Deluxe Edition)
"FYO"	2021	Michelle	—N/a
"GNIBN II"	2021	Helsinki Lambda Club, Peavis	Inception (of)
"Oh No!"	2022	Mondo Grosso	Big World
"Angry Girl"	2022	Confidence Man	Re-Tilt

=== Songwriting and production credits ===
Year	Artist	Album	Details
2019	Momoiro Clover Z	Momoiro Clover Z	Yuuki: lyrics, Mana: composition, Chai: production ("More We Do!")
2019	Batten Girls	BGM	Yuuki: lyrics ("Killer Killer Smile")
