= Azumi Waki =

Japanese voice actress (born 1994)

- 和氣 あず未
- Born: September 8, 1994 (age 32); Tokyo, Japan
- Other names: Ajuju; Ajumin
- Occupations: Voice actress; singer
- Years active: 2015–present
- Agent: Haikyō
- Notable work: The Legend of Heroes: Trails into Reverie as Lapis Rosenberg; Girls' Frontline as Steyr AUG; The Idolmaster Cinderella Girls as Sanae Katagiri; Please Tell Me! Galko-chan as Galko; Blend S as Maika Sakuranomiya; Umamusume: Pretty Derby as Special Week; How Not to Summon a Demon Lord as Rem Galleu; Ao-chan Can't Study! as Ao Horie; The Helpful Fox Senko-san as Senko-san; I'm Standing on a Million Lives as Kusue Hakozaki; Kuma Kuma Kuma Bear as Fina; Tokyo Revengers as Hinata Tachibana; Girlfriend, Girlfriend as Nagisa Minase
- Spouse: Undisclosed (m. 2023)
- Children: 1
- Musical career
- Genres: J-Pop; Anison
- Instrument: Vocals
- Years active: 2020–present
- Label: Nippon Columbia
- Website: columbia.jp/wakiazumi/

Azumi Waki (和氣 あず未, Waki Azumi; born September 8, 1994) is a Japanese voice actress and singer from Tokyo, Japan. She debuted in 2015, playing the role of Sanae Katagiri in the video game The Idolmaster Cinderella Girls. She is also known for her roles as Lapis Rosenberg in The Legend of Heroes: Trails into Reverie, Galko in Please Tell Me! Galko-chan, Steyr AUG in Girls' Frontline, Maika Sakuranomiya in Blend S, Special Week in Umamusume: Pretty Derby, and Senko in The Helpful Fox Senko-san.

In January 2020, she made her debut as a solo singer under Nippon Columbia.

== Biography ==
Waki was born in Tokyo. She has three older siblings. Although she had been interested in anime since she was young, she initially dreamed of becoming a flight attendant. She continued pursuing this dream after entering junior high school, although she gave up upon reaching high school because she felt that her English language skills were inadequate. At the age of 13, as her interest in anime grew, she instead decided to pursue a voice acting career.

Waki enrolled at the Tokyo Anime Voice Acting College after her third year of high school, where she would also work as a radio assistant personality while studying. After graduating from the college, she became affiliated with Haikyō. Her first voice acting role was as Sanae Katagiri in the video game and anime series The Idolmaster Cinderella Girls. That same year, she was cast as Eri Higuchi in the anime series Ani Tore! EX.

In 2016, Waki voiced Galko in the anime series Please Tell Me! Galko-chan. She along with her co-stars also performed the show's opening theme "YPMA Girls".

In 2017, she voiced Maika Sakuranomiya, the main character of the anime series Blend S; she and her co-stars Akari Kitō and Anzu Haruno performed the show's opening theme "Bon Appétit♡S" (ぼなぺてぃーと♡S, Bonapetīto♡Esu) and ending theme "Detarame na Minus to Plus ni Okeru Blend Kō" (デタラメなマイナスとプラスにおけるブレンド考, Detarame na Mainasu to Purasu ni Okeru Burendo Kō) under the name Blend A. She was also cast as the character Special Week in the multimedia franchise Umamusume: Pretty Derby.

In 2018, Waki played Special Week in the anime series of Umamusume: Pretty Derby. She also played the role of Rem Galleu in the anime series How Not to Summon a Demon Lord, and Elly in the anime series Ms. Vampire who lives in my neighborhood.

In 2019, she played Ao Horie in the anime series Ao-chan Can't Study!. She also played the role of Senko in the anime series The Helpful Fox Senko-san, Shion Kujō in the anime series Are You Lost?, and Adele von Ascham in the anime series Didn't I Say to Make My Abilities Average in the Next Life?!.

In 2020, she played Akari in the anime series Shachibato! President, It's Time for Battle!, Kusue Hakozaki in the anime series I'm Standing on a Million Lives, and Fina in the anime series Kuma Kuma Kuma Bear.

In 2021, she played Hinata Tachibana in the anime series Tokyo Revengers, Flatorte in the anime series I've Been Killing Slimes for 300 Years and Maxed Out My Level, Nagisa Minase in the anime series Girlfriend, Girlfriend, and Tsukimi Teruya in The Aquatope on White Sand.

In 2022, she played Nanao Inusaka in the anime series Orient, and Dryad in the anime series My Isekai Life.

In August 2023, she announced her marriage to a man whom she met through a common hobby of gaming. In October 2024, she announced on X (formally Twitter) that she was expecting her first child. In February 15, 2025, she announced the birth of her child. On July 16, 2025, Waki announced she will reduce her workload to take of her daughter who was diagnosed with dilated cardiomyopathy and has an artificial heart.

== Filmography ==
=== Anime series ===
Year	Title	Role	Notes	Ref.
2015	The Idolmaster Cinderella Girls	Sanae Katagiri		
2015	Magical Girl Lyrical Nanoha ViVid	Luka		
2015	Anitore! EX	Eri Higuchi		
2016	Please Tell Me! Galko-chan	Galko		
2016	BBK/BRNK	Dorsey, Domina		
2017	Blend S	Maika Sakuranomiya		
2018	Katana Maidens ~ Toji No Miko	Mai Yanase		
2018	Umamusume: Pretty Derby	Special Week		
2018	How Not to Summon a Demon Lord	Rem Galleu		
2018	Ms. Vampire Who Lives in My Neighborhood	Ellie		
2019	Mini Toji	Mai Yanase		
2019	Ao-chan Can't Study!	Ao Horie		
2019	The Helpful Fox Senko-san	Senko		
2019	Are You Lost?	Shion Kujō		
2019	Didn't I Say to Make My Abilities Average in the Next Life?!	Adele von Ascham / Mile		
2019	Assassins Pride	Salacha Schicksal		
2020	My Next Life as a Villainess: All Routes Lead to Doom!	Anne Shelley		
2020	Shachibato! President, It's Time for Battle!	Akari		
2020	I'm Standing on a Million Lives	Kusue Hakozaki		
2020	Kuma Kuma Kuma Bear	Fina		
2020	Our Last Crusade or the Rise of a New World	Sisbell Lou Nebulis IX		
2021	Umamusume: Pretty Derby Season 2	Special Week		
2021	Ex-Arm	Elmira		
2021	Farewell, My Dear Cramer	Ayumi Kishi		
2021	How Not to Summon a Demon Lord Ω	Rem Galleu		
2021	I've Been Killing Slimes for 300 Years and Maxed Out My Level	Flatorte		
2021	Tokyo Revengers	Hinata Tachibana		
2021	Girlfriend, Girlfriend	Nagisa Minase		
2021	My Next Life as a Villainess: All Routes Lead to Doom! X	Anne Shelley		
2021	The Aquatope on White Sand	Tsukimi Teruya		
2021	I'm Standing on a Million Lives 2nd Season	Kusue Hakozaki		
2021	180-Byō de Kimi no Mimi o Shiawase ni Dekiru ka?	Hikari Sawake		
2021	Muv-Luv Alternative	Tо̄ko Kazama		
2022	Orient	Nanao Inusaka		
2022	Girls' Frontline	Steyr AUG		
2022	My Isekai Life	Dryad		
2022	Call of the Night	Hatsuka Suzushiro		
2022	Prima Doll	Haizakura		
2022	Hanabi-chan Is Often Late	Hanabi Hana Ariake		
2022	Beast Tamer	Kanade		
2022	Do It Yourself!!	Takumi		
2022	More Than a Married Couple, But Not Lovers	Natsumi Ōhashi		
2022	Delicious Party Pretty Cure	Maira Isuki		
2023	The Iceblade Sorcerer Shall Rule the World	Rebecca Bradley		
2023	The Reincarnation of the Strongest Exorcist in Another World	Efa		
2023	Kuma Kuma Kuma Bear Punch!	Fina		
2023	The Café Terrace and Its Goddesses	Shiragiku Ono		
2023	My One-Hit Kill Sister	Sophie		
2023	Shangri-La Frontier	Saiga 0 / Rei Saiga		
2023	The Kingdoms of Ruin	Doroka		
2023	Protocol: Rain	Emiko Takanashi		
2023	Umamusume: Pretty Derby Season 3	Special Week		
2024	Frieren	Kanne		
2024	Villainess Level 99	Alicia Ehnleit		
2024	Go! Go! Loser Ranger!	Kanon Hisui		
2024	Train to the End of the World	Nadeshiko Hoshi		
2024	The Strongest Magician in the Demon Lord's Army Was a Human	Lilith		
2024	A Nobody's Way Up to an Exploration Hero	Haruka Katsuragi		
2024	Too Many Losing Heroines!	Karen Himemiya		
2024	Demon Lord, Retry! R	Akane Fujisaki		
2025	Aquarion: Myth of Emotions	Momohime Amaha		

=== Original net animations ===
Year	Title	Role	Notes	Ref.
2019	Null & Peta	Null		
2021	Teach Me, Hokusai!	Tenkorin Okakura		

=== Theatrical animation ===
- The Orbital Children (2022) – Konoha Be Nanase
- My Next Life as a Villainess: All Routes Lead to Doom! The Movie (2023) – Anne Shelley
- Dead Dead Demon's Dededede Destruction (2024) – Futaba Takemoto

=== Video games ===
- The Idolmaster Cinderella Girls – Sanae Katagiri
- Shikigami Monogatari – Tsukito
- 8 Beat Story – Yukina Hoshimiya
- Kirara Fantasia – Clea, Sakuranomiya Maika
- Shoujo Kageki Revue Starlight: Re LIVE – Otonashi Ichie
- Magia Record (2018) – Seika Kumi
- Astral Chain – Olive
- Girls' Frontline – AK-12, Steyr AUG
- Dead or Alive Xtreme Venus Vacation – Sayuri
- Fate/Grand Order – Fairy Knight Tristan (Baobhan Sith)
- Fire Emblem Heroes – Peony
- Azur Lane – Suzuya, Kumano
- Ash Arms – M7 Priest, M18 Hellcat
- The Legend of Heroes: Trails into Reverie – Lapis Rosenberg
- Touhou Cannonball – Youmu Konpaku
- Alchemy Stars – Clover, Pepi, Philyshy
- The Legend of Heroes: Trails Through Daybreak II – Zita Asverl
- Lackgirl I – Mizuha
- Loop8: Summer of Gods – Konoha
- Towa Tsugai – Flamingo
- Genshin Impact – Charlotte
- Umamusume: Pretty Derby – Special Week

=== Dubbing ===
==== Others ====
- The Summer You Were There (manga), Asaka Kaori (promotional videos)
- The Fragrant Flower Blooms with Dignity (manga), Kaoruko Waguri (promotional videos)

== Discography ==
=== Studio albums ===
Title	Album details	Catalog no.		Oricon	
Title	Album details	Regular edition	Limited edition	Peak position	Weeks charted
Chō Kakumei-teki Koisuru Nichijō (超革命的恋する日常)	Released: February 17, 2021; Label: Nippon Columbia	COCX-41392	COZX-1716/7	29	1
Stay Beautiful Stay Beautiful	Released: November 30, 2022; Label: Nippon Columbia	COCX-41906		21	1

=== Singles ===
Song(s)	Details	Catalog no.		Oricon	
Song(s)	Details	Regular edition	Limited edition	Peak position	Weeks charted
Fuwatto (ふわっと) Citrus (シトラス)	Released: February 10, 2020; Label: Nippon Columbia	COCC-17736	COZC-1617/8 (Disc A); COZC-1619/20 (Disc B)	20	2
Hurry Love Koi to Yobu ni wa (恋と呼ぶには)	Released: June 22, 2020; Label: Nippon Columbia; Shachibato! President, It's Time for Battle! opening theme	COCC-17762	COZC-1649/50 (Disc A); COZC-1651/2 (Disc B)	16	4
Itsuka no Kioku (イツカノキオク) Tо̄mei no Pedal (透明のペダル)	Released: October 7, 2020; Label: Nippon Columbia; Kuma Kuma Kuma Bear opening theme	COCC-17810	COZC-1679/80 (Special DVD edition)	20	8
Viewtiful Days! Kioku ni Koi wo Shita (記憶に恋をした)	Released: June 16, 2021; Label: Nippon Columbia; I've Been Killing Slimes for 300 Years and Maxed Out My Level ending theme	COCC-17881	COZC-1751/2 (Special DVD edition)	19	3
Kimito no Mirai (キミトノミライ) Invisible stars	Released: April 12, 2023; Label: Nippon Columbia; Kuma Kuma Kuma Bear Punch! opening theme	COCC-18068	COZC-1980/1 (First Press Limited Edition)		
