= Chai (album) =

Studio album by Chai
- Released: September 22, 2023
- Genre: City pop
- Length: 29:49
- Language: English; Japanese
- Label: Sub Pop; Otemayon

Chai chronology
Wink (2021)	Chai (2023)

Chai is the fourth and final studio album by Japanese rock quartet Chai, released on September 22, 2023. It is their second album on Sub Pop, and received acclaim from critics.

== Critical reception ==
Professional ratings
Aggregate scores
Source	Rating
Metacritic	84/100
Review scores
Source	Rating
AllMusic	4/5 stars
And It Don't Stop	A−
Clash	8/10
Exclaim!	8/10
NME	4/5 stars
Pitchfork	7.4/10

Chai received a score of 84 out of 100 on review aggregator Metacritic based on five critics' reviews, indicating "universal acclaim". Sam Walker-Smart of Clash wrote that Chai "embrace and update 80s city pop" and "by merging this effortlessly smooth blueprint with their own punk lyrics and ethos, Chai has created an album that's warmly inviting yet still exciting". Marko Djurdjic of Exclaim! called Chai "sleek" and "rousing" and opined that "the band subvert these traditions and expectations to deliver one of the most exciting, well-produced and bold pop albums of the year".

NME's Erica Campbell described it as "an intentional ode to city pop, [...] all with the goal of digging into their heritage and identity filtered through a Western sonic lens. The result isn't at all dated go, as the quartet revel in modern beats, swirling soulful '90s arrangements under lyrics they associate with nostalgia". Amanda Farah of The Quietus found that "whereas their previous album, Wink, had some laidback grooves and opportunities to properly croon, Chai bounces along at a high energy clip, honing a polished and effervescent pop record".

Reviewing the album for Pitchfork, Ryo Miyauchi stated that Chai "evolve their perspective and sound, exploring the decadent grooves of city pop as they contend with growing up", also writing that "at its best, the peppy dance production can sound as invigorating as their old punk music". Tim Sendra of AllMusic found that Chai "imbue their city pop with a healthy dose of giddy energy along with loads of non-preachy empowerment, dancefloor-filling rhythms, and shouted choruses", concluding that "as long as they make records as carefree and positively joyful as this, they will always be worth checking out".

== Track listing ==
Chai track listing
No.	Title	Lyrics	Music	Arranger(s)	Length
1.	"Matcha"	Yuuki Mizutani	Mana Obata; Kana Obata; Ryu Takahashi	Takahashi; Paul "BaeBro" Wilson	3:26
2.	"From 1992"	Mizutani	M. Obata; K. Obata; Takahashi; Masayuki Hirano; Wilson	Hirano; Takashi; Wilson	3:20
3.	"Para Para"	M. Obata	M. Obata; Takahashi; Hirano; Mathias Hatleskog Tjønn	Chai; Hirano; Takahashi; Tjønn	2:50
4.	"Game"	Mizutani	M. Obata; K. Obata; Takahashi; Tjønn	Takahashi	2:45
5.	"We the Female!"	Mizutani	M. Obata; K. Obata; Takahashi; Tjønn	Takahashi; Tjønn	3:04
6.	"Neo Kawaii, K?"	Mizutani	M. Obata; K. Obata; Takahashi	K. Obata; M. Obata; Takahashi	2:34
7.	"I Can't Organizeeee"	M. Obata	M. Obata; K. Obata; Yuna Matsui; Hirano; Takahashi	Hirano; Alex Mackay; Takahashi	2:57
8.	"Driving22"	Mizutani	M. Obata; K. Obata; Hirano; Takahashi	Mackay; Takahashi	2:52
9.	"Like, I Need"	Mizutani	M. Obata; K. Obata; Takahashi; Hirano; Wilson	Hirano; Takahashi; Wilson	2:43
10.	"Karaoke"	M. Obata	M. Obata; K. Obata; Takahashi; Hirano; Wilson	Hirano; Takahashi; Wilson	3:18
Total length:					29:49

== Personnel ==
Chai

- Kana – vocals, guitar
- Mana – vocals, keyboards
- Yuuki – bass guitar, chorus
- Yuna – drums, chorus

Technical

- Ryu Takahashi – production
- Paul "BaeBro" Wilson – production (tracks 1, 3)
- Reuben Cainer – production (3)
- Alex Deturk – mastering
- Chris Soper – mixing (1, 3, 5–8)
- Jesse Singer – mixing (1, 3, 5–8)
- Chris Wang – mixing (2, 4, 9, 10)
- Collin Davis – engineering
- Febe Esquerra – engineering (2, 4–10)
- Jake Lummus – engineering (3)

== Charts ==
Chart performance for Chai
Chart (2023)	Peak position
Japanese Hot Albums (Billboard Japan)	96
