= Shachibato! President, It's Time for Battle! =

Japanese video game and anime series

- Featuring the main characters.

社長、バトルの時間です！ (Shachō, Batoru no Jikan Desu!)
- Genre: Isekai
- Light novel

Shachō, Battle no Jikan desu! 〜Kibou Company no To Aru 1 nichi〜
- Written by: Yusaku Igarashi
- Illustrated by: Kurone Mishima
- Published by: Kadokawa
- Magazine: Dengeki Bunko Magazine
- Original run: July 10, 2019 – present
- Manga

Shachibato! 〜Shachō, Battle no Jikan desu!〜
- Written by: Yuuki.
- Published by: Kadokawa
- Magazine: Shōnen Ace plus
- Original run: August 30, 2019 – present
- Video game
- Developer: Deluxe Games, Preapp Partners
- Publisher: Kadokawa Games
- Genre: Role-playing game
- Platform: Android, iOS
- Released: JP: October 17, 2019
- Anime television series
- Directed by: Hiroki Ikeshita
- Written by: Kenta Ihara
- Music by: Yukari Hashimoto
- Studio: C2C
- Licensed by: Funimation
- Original network: AT-X, Tokyo MX, KBS Kyoto, Sun TV, BS NTV, TV Aichi
- Original run: April 5, 2020 – June 28, 2020
- Episodes: 12

Shachibato! President, It's Time for Battle! (Japanese: 社長、バトルの時間です！, Hepburn: Shachō, Batoru no Jikan Desu!; lit. "President, It's Time for Battle!"), or simply Shachibato!, is an online free-to-play role-playing game created by Kadokawa, Deluxe Games, and Preapp Partners. It was released in Japan on October 17, 2019, for Android and iOS devices. An anime television series adaptation by C2C aired from April 5 to June 28, 2020. The game ended service on October 31, 2020.

== Characters ==
=== Kibou Company ===
Minato (ミナト)
Voiced by: Shun Horie (Japanese); Josh Grelle (English)
The new president of Kibou Company and the main protagonist.
Yutoria (ユトリア)
Voiced by: Kana Ichinose (Japanese); Jill Harris (English)
The secretary of Kibou Company and Minato's childhood friend.
Akari (アカリ)
Voiced by: Azumi Waki (Japanese); Katelyn Barr (English)
A warrior who works for Kibou Company. She is Makoto's older sister.
Makoto (マコト)
Voiced by: Yoshino Aoyama (Japanese); Morgan Berry (English)
A monk and botanist who works for Kibou Company. He is Akari's younger brother.
Guide (ガイド, Gaido)
Voiced by: Yui Horie (Japanese); Tia Ballard (English)
A longtime employee of Kibou Company who is in charge of deskwork. She has been with the company since it was founded 15 years ago by Minato's father.
Marika (マリカ)
Voiced by: Minami Takahashi (Japanese); Megan Shipman (English)
A self-proclaimed genius wizard who becomes a new employee of Kibou Company.
Mineko (ミネ子)
Voiced by: Akane Fujita (Japanese); Suzie Yeung (English)
A maju that can speak human language and a new employee of Kibou Company. She was an outcast among her tribe and was recruited by Makoto to join.

=== Other characters ===
Rivar (ライバー, Raibā)
Voiced by: Taku Yashiro (Japanese); Daman Mills (English)
President of the startup company Cyedge. While a skilled adventurer himself, his arrogance often gets him into trouble.
Valmi (ヴァル美, Varumi)
Voiced by: Sumire Uesaka (Japanese); Emily Neves (English)
An employee of Cyedge.
Subaru (スバル)
Voiced by: Himika Akaneya (Japanese); Dawn M. Bennett (English)
A knight working for Imperial, one of the top companies in the world.
Goddess (女神)
Voiced by: Mai Nakahara
A mysterious being who created the Big Gate at the core of Gatepia.

== Anime ==
An anime television series adaptation was announced on December 1, 2019. It is set in an alternative world where the player acts as the "president". Their responsibility is to recruit and train adventures who are then dispatched into dungeons to fight monsters and collect loot. The series is animated by C2C and directed by Hiroki Ikeshita, with Kenta Ihara handling series composition, Keisuke Watanabe designing the characters, and Yukari Hashimoto composing the series' music. Azumi Waki performs the opening theme song "Hurry Love", while Kana Ichinose performs the ending theme song "Oyasumi" (おやすみ, Good Night). It aired from April 5 to June 28, 2020. Episode 11 was set to originally air on June 14, 2020, but had been delayed a week later to June 21, 2020, due to production problems.

No.	Title	Original release date
1	"Induction as President"; Transliteration: "Shachō Shūnin" (Japanese: 社長就任)	April 5, 2020
In the world Gatepia, which is powered by the energy source kirakuri, Minato is provisionally named the new president of Kibou Company by his childhood friend Yutoria, who serves as his secretary. An instructional video explains that the goal for clearing dungeons is to fend off creatures called maju and collect kirakuri in exchange for money. Yutoria introduces Minato to Akari the warrior, Makoto the botanist priest and Guide the deskwork handler as his other employees. Before Minato can be officially inducted into Kibou Company, he joins his employees on a mission to find an order form kirakuri inside a dungeon resembling a valley. Along the way, Minato retrieves a rare sialme flower grown on a cliff with assistance from Akari for an adventurer named Thomas. After Makoto heals Akari when she is attacked by a boss maju called a volf, Minato encourages Yutoria and Guide to throw the slime corpses of small maju called slaby at the tail of the volf to cut off its sensory perception. With the volf now defeated, Thomas points Minato in the direction of the order form kirakuri kept in the middle of a forest, thereby completing the mission.
2	"Inheritance"; Transliteration: "Isan Sōzoku" (Japanese: 遺産相続)	April 12, 2020
After Yutoria informs him that Kibou Company has declared bankruptcy, Minato is surprised that his missing father used to collect cursed weapons as a hobby. Looking for a way out of declaring bankruptcy, Minato decides to fund Kibou Company through his father's legacy, which was previously donated to a museum. However, Minato and Yutoria learn from the curator that they must pay a steep inheritance tax in order to claim the legacy. While brainstorming ways to make money quickly, Minato, Yutoria, Akari, Makoto and Guide decide to participate in the Eighth Good Adventure Contest with the prize money being enough to cover the inheritance tax. Among the competitors is Rivar, the president of the successful startup company Cyedge and a former classmate of Akari, who has since forgotten about him during their time at Adventure Skills Technical School, as well as Valmi, Rivar's only employee. Inside the dungeon, the adventurers are faced with multiple-choice questions in business transactions. After Minato proves his knowledge in the first two questions, Rivar wagers a bet with Akari, who promises to join Cyedge if Kibou Company loses the contest.
3	"Order Contest"; Transliteration: "Juchū Konpe" (Japanese: 受注コンペ)	April 19, 2020
After Makoto answers the third question correctly, he flaunts his knowledge to the other members of Kibou Company about different plant species of maju, including the ground sesame, the red-eyed Susan and the restructroot. Cyedge reaches a giant three-headed dog maju, having heads representing the boss, management and subordinate. Akari helps Rivar and Valmi take on the three-headed dog maju, but to no avail. Minato formulates a plan for Akari and Rivar to attack from behind, while Yutoria, Makoto and Guide distract from the front, causing the boss and subordinate to quarrel with the management caught in the middle. This gives Akari and Rivar the opportunity to finally defeat the three-headed dog maju. However, the order form kirakuri has already been claimed by Subaru, an employee of Imperial, the top company of Gatepia. Before leaving, Subaru reveals that she previously snuck past the three-headed dog maju while it was sleeping long before Rivar provoked a fight with it. Even though both Kibou Company and Cyedge lost the contest, Valmi privately tells Minato that his current two-star rank undermines his adept command and analysis skills. Later on, Minato tells Yutoria that the morale of Kibo Company has greatly improved.
4	"Treasure Hunt"; Transliteration: "Zaihō Tansaku" (Japanese: 財宝探索)	April 26, 2020
Yutoria makes a juicy discovery in a treasure map found by her acquaintance, the self-proclaimed genius wizard Marika. Minato, Yutoria and Marika decide to go treasure hunting in the Rurud Forest on the outskirts of town, coming across Thomas again. With Thomas's help, Minato, Yutoria and Marika find a pair of trees resembling antlers, where Minato digs up a buried tin box containing a letter pointing them in the direction of a mansion perceived as a haunted house. Meanwhile, Akari and Makoto explore the shopping district, running into Guide, who just finished making an emergency deposit. Minato, Yutoria, Marika and Thomas enter the mansion, eventually finding a floral painting inside a room. After Marika proves her strength against three ghost-type maju, Yutoria finds a letter behind the floral painting. The treasure is a letter written by Marika's late grandfather, telling Marika that he orchestrated this treasure hunt so that it could only be completed through the act of friendship, the most priceless treasure of all. Marika accepts Thomas as her new friend. Minato later realizes that his father once orchestrated a treasure hunt for him to become friends with Yutoria since childhood.
5	"New Employee"; Transliteration: "Shinnyū Shain" (Japanese: 新入社員)	May 3, 2020
A few days later, Minato and Yutoria receive the profits made by Marika, who sold bracers acquired from the ghost-type maju that she previously defeated. Minato and Yutoria return the favor by having Marika as a new employee of Kibou Company. Guide states that Marika must submit an employment contract to be officially hired. While trying to fetch the misplaced employment contact at the mansion, Minato and Marika are unexpectedly transported to the tunnels under the city with a strange anomaly. Meanwhile, Rivar and Valmi explore a rumored mechanized dungeon. Minato is forced to carry Marika to the exit after she reveals her fear of mice. Rivar and Valmi encounter knight maju guarding a trove of valuable minerals called rare earth. Later on, Guide reports that Rivar was seriously injured by the knight maju, prompting Minato, Yutoria, Akari and Makoto to begrudgingly pay a visit to Cyedge. Valmi escorts Minato, Yutoria, Akari and Makoto to see Rivar, confirming what happened while he was inside the mechanized dungeon and how Valmi carried him to the infirmary. Before Kibou Company prepares to explore the mechanized dungeon, Guide reminds Minato to submit Marika's employment contract first.
6	"Business Goals"; Transliteration: "Kigyō Mokuhyō" (Japanese: 企業目標)	May 10, 2020
With Marika officially hired as a new employee of Kibou Company, Guide holds down the fort while Minato, Yutoria, Akari, Makoto and Marika set off to explore the mechanized dungeon. After dodging a bunch of booby traps, they soon take on the knight maju guarding the trove of rare earth, though a king boss maju quickly revives the knight maju. Akari and Marika are consequently infected and turned into corporate servants. Minato orders Yutoria to distract the knight maju so Makoto can use his healing magic, which allows the knight maju to finally take time off work. Yutoria then knocks out the king boss maju sneaking up behind Minato, while Akari and Marika revert to normal. Using the trove of rare earth harvested from the mechanized dungeon, Minato pays off the inheritance tax and claims his father's legacy. Among the valuable items is a holographic message from Minato's father, who arranged the inheritance tax to test Kibou Company. Minato's father also reveals that he ventured inside the Big Gate, the heart of Gatepia, waiting for Kibou Company to join him in investigating the anomalies. Kibou Company plans to summon the Goddess to grant entry inside the Big Gate.
7	"Interim Report"; Transliteration: "Chūkan Kessan" (Japanese: 中間決算)	May 17, 2020
While Yutoria, Akari, Makoto and Marika go to a dungeon, Minato stays behind to help Guide complete an interim report on all of their paperwork, though Minato struggles as Guide zips through when they use typewriters to manually enter the data. During a lunch break, Minato and Guide go picnicking on a field overlooking the Big Gate, and Guide reveals that she has been working at Kibou Company for fifteen years. Later on, a hoodlum claims that Kibou Company reserved the legendary sword Excalibur for him, but Minato is impressed when Guide scares off the hoodlu, since she is used to dealing with customer complaints. In the evening, Minato is further astonished that Guide can hold down her liquor in a bar. The next day, Minato meets Akari by the port at noon. After passing by a weapons and armor shop, Akari convinces Minato to share each other's kebabs from a food vendor. Minato notices that the hoodlum is selling bootlegged carropan maju purses, preventing Akari from falling for a scam. Akari ultimately buys Minato a tie bar that boosts mental focus as a token of her appreciation for everything he has done for her so far.
8	"New Species Discovered"; Transliteration: "Shinshu Hakken" (Japanese: 新種発見)	May 24, 2020
Minato and Makoto overhear Yutoria, Akari and Marika discussing the rumor of a new species of intelligent maju called famnela with the ability to fluently speak the human language. They all travel to a dungeon where the talking famnela was last spotted. With the dungeon filled with colorful kirakuri, Akari saves Makoto from getting attacked by some silent and unfriendly famnela, while Marika scares them off with conjured flames. Makoto then marvel over a healing magic special herb called niorone and an incredible lucky valuable plant called a crystal flower. However, Minato and Makoto fall through a trap deeper in the dungeon, being separated from Yutoria, Akari and Marika. With Makoto passed out, Minato is surrounded by skeleton maju, only to be saved by an unknown creature living inside Makoto's rucksack. Upon regaining consciousness, Makoto apologizes to Minato for his reckless behavior. Minato and Makoto find a way out of the dungeon after encountering Mineko, who is revealed to be the talking famnela. Just when Makoto offers to befriend Mineko, she retreats after suddenly being attacked Rivar, who was previously found wandering around by Yutoria, Akari and Marika.
9	"Knight in Shining Armour"; Transliteration: "Hakuba no Kishi" (Japanese: 白馬の騎士)	May 31, 2020
Minato, Yutoria, Akari, Makoto, Marika and Rivar search for Mineko inside the dungeon, soon confirming that Mineko is being bullied by her famnela pack in a den. Rivar is sent as bait to lure the famnela pack out of the den, using shiny coins to grab their attention. Because Mineko has been rejected by her famnela pack for being different, Makoto decides to recruit Mineko as a member of Kibou Company, garnering support from Minato, Yutoria, Akari and Marika. However, the famnela queen returns to the den and prepares to fight. Makoto uses healing magic as an attack to thwart the famnela queen as an undead-type maju, allowing Mineko to defeat the famnela queen in one blow. Meanwhile, Rivar is still occupied by the famnela pack. Minato, Yutoria, Akari, Makoto and Marika are taken to an area with tons of rare earth that Mineko stashed away. Mineko willingly surrenders her collection in order to stabilize the finances of Kibou Company. Rivar somehow becomes the new leader of the famnela pack against his wishes.
10	"Corporate Warrior"; Transliteration: "Kigyō Senshi" (Japanese: 企業戦士)	June 7, 2020
Thanks to Mineko's contribution, the earnings report gives a good review for Kibou Company. Minato and Yutoria are excited to clear another dungeon, though Akari, Makoto, Guide, Marika and Mineko have prior engagements. It is revealed that Yutoria was a ruthless warrior before becoming a levelheaded secretary. Minato and Yutoria enter a dungeon in the form of an open field, where they face legged slaby with the ability to multiply when cut apart. When Minato figures out that the neckties are the weak spots of the legged slaby, Yutoria finally manages to defeat them. After having a nostalgic moment, Minato and Yutoria are approached by a friendly boar maju, who leads them to a small pile of kirakuri. Upon returning to the office, Minato is caught off guard when Yutoria suddenly gets a fever. Minato boils homemade egg soup for Yutoria, who then offers to share the bed with him overnight. After recalling some childhood memories, Minato tells Yutoria that he would never resign as president of Kibou Company if they find Minato's father beyond the Big Gate. The next morning, Yutoria cooks a homemade breakfast for Minato just as Akari, Makoto, Guide, Marika and Mineko arrive at the office.
11	"Business Opportunity"; Transliteration: "Shōki Tōrai" (Japanese: 商機到来)	June 21, 2020
The members of Kibou Company are a little rattled when a earthquake suddenly occurs. Detecting the smell of kirakuri nearby, Mineko brings Minato, Yutoria, Akari, Makoto and Marika to the source, while Guide holds down the fort at the office. The source is a mechanized dungeon that was mysteriously conjured next to the Big Gate. Before entering the mechanized dungeon, Minato, Yutoria, Akari, Makoto, Marika and Mineko run into Rivar and Valmi. They all watch as Subaru enters the mechanized dungeon resembling a hallway before they follow suit. Mineko easily scares off some weakened knight maju, putting Akari and Marika at ease. After falling into a trap, Minato and Yutoria get separated from Akari, Makoto, Marika and Mineko. The latter four easily defeat a weakened three-headed dog maju, while the former two pair up with Rivar and Valmi to handle more weakened knight maju. Valmi reveals that Minato used to be an elite employee of Imperial, but he was fired for workplace violence. As Akari, Makoto, Marika and Mineko catch up to Minato, Yutoria, Rivar and Valmi, they are attacked by a psychopath management maju.
12	"Management Fad"; Transliteration: "Keiei Rinen" (Japanese: 経営理念)	June 28, 2020
When Minato gets injured from the attack, the others hide from being seen by the psychopath management maju. Subaru arrives to explain that Minato was fired from Imperial by his former boss, who mistreated the subordinates but was later demoted for punching Minato in the face. When Minato regains consciousness, he strategically orders Subaru to grab the attention of the psychopath management maju; Akari and Rivar to keep it busy up close; Yutoria and Makoto to provide support and hit any openings; and Marika and Valmi to prevent it from escaping. Minato shows compassion to the previously defeated maju and chooses not to defeat the powerless psychopath management maju. Subaru unveils that Minato actually has a seven-star rank when the group reaches the kirakuri. The group leaves the mechanized dungeon when it starts to collapse. Using the acquired kirakuri, Kibou Company summons the Goddess, though she proves to be less than helpful in locating Minato's father, who is still alive somewhere. Meanwhile, Subaru informs the grand council to invest in Kibou Company to stop the anomalies occurring in the Big Gate. The last scene shows Kibou Company taking a commemorative photo at the beach.
