= Punk (Chai album) =

Studio album by Chai
- Released: February 13, 2019 (Japan)
- Genres: Bubblegum pop; indie pop; new wave; punk rock; synth-pop
- Length: 31:06
- Labels: Burger Records; Heavenly Recordings; Otemoyan

Chai chronology
| Wagama-mania (2018) | Punk (2019) | Wink (2021) |

Singles from Punk
- 1. "Great Job" Released: 2018; 2. "Wintime" Released: 2018; 3. "Choose Go!" Released: 2019

Professional ratings
Aggregate scores
| Source | Rating |
|---|---|
| AnyDecentMusic? | 7.9/10 |
| Metacritic | 86/100 |
Review scores
| Source | Rating |
| AllMusic | 4/5 stars |
| DIY | 4/5 stars |
| Exclaim! | 9/10 |
| The Guardian | 4/5 stars |
| The Line of Best Fit | 9/10 |
| Pitchfork | 8.3/10 |
| Q | 4/5 stars |
| The Skinny | 4/5 stars |
| Spectrum Culture | 4/5 stars |
| Vice (Expert Witness) | A− |

Punk (stylized in all caps) is the second studio album by Japanese band Chai. The album was released on February 13, 2019, by Otemoyan Records. It was released on March 15, 2019, in North America and Europe by Burger Records and Heavenly Recordings, respectively.

== Composition ==
AllMusic's Tim Sendra felt the record left some of the rap rock influences prominent on PINK behind in exchange for more pop-oriented stylings. Indeed, PUNK dives into several pop-based genres from bubblegum to indie to synth-pop.

Kicking off the record is "Choose Go!", a "punchy" piece of "cheerleader rock", that features "synths that churn like vacuum cleaners." Following is "the pulsing electronic pop" of "Great Job". "Wintime" is "Paramore-plucked, rose-tinted tropic-pop".

"This Is Chai", the record's only song to have its writing credited to all four members, has been called everything from post-punk to Europop to "happily corny handbag house". "Fashionista", along with "This is CHAI", "has some seriously infectious funk woven into its DNA". "Curly Adventure" is a "synth-pop ballad" that "throw[s] heavy metal guitar grind" into its mix.

== Accolades ==
Accolades for Punk
| Publication | Accolade | Rank | Ref. |
|---|---|---|---|
| Noisey | Top 100 Albums of 2019 | 97 | |
| Pitchfork | Top 50 Albums of 2019 | 46 | |
| RX Music | Best Albums of 2019 (Indie Pop) | 5 | |
| Thrillist | Top 35 Albums of 2019 | 20 | |

=== Tracks ===
Accolades for tracks from Punk
| Publication | Work | List | Rank | Ref. |
|---|---|---|---|---|
| Pitchfork | "Fashionista" | The 100 Best Songs of 2019 | 59 | |

== Accompanying music video ==
In 2019, a music video for the eighth track (Curly Adventure) was directed by Sean Solomon, using character designs from band member and visual director Yuuki, in which the video picks a load of eccentric (and surreal)scenes with vibrant colours with the simplistic style of the album's cover, inspired by Peanuts characters and the hyper-stylized Hanna-Barbera cartoons of the 1970s. The additional credits in the video are storyboards drawn by Evan Red Borja and animation by Sarah Schmidt and Ian Ballantyne.

== Track listing ==
All music by Mana and Kana, except where noted. All lyrics by Yuuki, except where noted.

Punk track listing
| No. | Title | Writer(s) | Length |
|---|---|---|---|
| 1. | "Choose Go!" | Mana (music); Yuuki (lyrics) | 2:42 |
| 2. | "Great Job" | | 3:15 |
| 3. | "I'm Me" | | 3:21 |
| 4. | "Wintime" | Mana (music); Yuuki (lyrics) | 2:39 |
| 5. | "This Is Chai" | Chai (music & lyrics) | 2:37 |
| 6. | "Fashionista" | Mana (music); Yuuki (lyrics) | 2:56 |
| 7. | "Family Member" | | 3:11 |
| 8. | "Curly Adventure" | | 3:21 |
| 9. | "Feel the Beat" | | 3:42 |
| 10. | "Future" | Mana (music); Yuuki (lyrics) | 3:22 |
| Total length: | | | 31:06 |

== Personnel ==
Chai

- Kana – vocals, guitar
- Mana – vocals, keyboards
- Yuuki – bass guitar, chorus
- Yuna – drums, chorus

== Charts ==
Chart performance for Punk
| Chart (2019) | Peak position |
|---|---|
| Japanese Albums (Oricon) | 50 |
| Japanese Hot Albums (Billboard Japan) | 72 |

== Use in other media ==
A song from the album, "This Is Chai", was featured prominently in an episode of the American television series Better Call Saul in 2020.
