= Pink (Chai album) =

Studio album by Chai
- Released: October 25, 2017
- Genre: Dance-punk; j-pop; indie pop; alternative dance; rap rock; new wave
- Length: 34:54
- Label: Burger Records; Otemoyan

Chai chronology
Homegoro Series (2017)	Pink (2017)	Wagama-mania (2018)

Singles from Pink
- 1. "N.E.O." Released: October 11, 2017; 2. "Sayonara Complex" Released: October 11, 2017

Professional ratings
Aggregate scores
Source	Rating
Metacritic	84/100
Review scores
Source	Rating
AllMusic	4/5 stars
DIY	4/5 stars
The Skinny	4/5 stars

Pink (stylized in all caps) is the debut studio album by Japanese band Chai. The album was released on October 25, 2017 by Otemoyan Records. It was released on September 8, 2018 in North America by Burger Records.

== Track listing ==
Pink track listing
No.	Title	Length
1.	"Hihi Baby"	2:20
2.	"N.E.O."	2:49
3.	"Boyz Seco Man"	4:21
4.	"Horrechatta"	3:33
5.	"Fried"	2:57
6.	"She Is Kitty"	3:26
7.	"Gyaranboo"	2:59
8.	"Cute Girl"	1:40
9.	"Walking Star"	2:59
10.	"Sayonara Complex"	4:28
11.	"Flat Girl"	3:22
Total length:		34:54

== Personnel ==
Chai

- Kana – vocals, guitar
- Mana – vocals, keyboards
- Yuuki – bass guitar, chorus
- Yuna – drums, chorus

== Charts ==
Chart performance for Pink
Chart (2017–2019)	Peak position
Japanese Albums (Oricon)	41
Japanese Hot Albums (Billboard Japan)	45
