= Magilumiere Magical Girls Inc. =

Japanese manga series

- First tankōbon volume cover, featuring Hitomi Koshigaya, Kana Sakuragi (front), Kazuo Nikoyama, Kaede Midorikawa, and Kouji Shigemoto (back)

株式会社マジルミエ (Kabushiki Gaisha Majirumie)
- Genre: Action; Magical girl; Satire
- Manga
- Written by: Sekka Iwata
- Illustrated by: Yu Aoki
- Published by: Shueisha
- English publisher: NA: Viz Media
- Imprint: Jump Comics+
- Magazine: Shōnen Jump+
- Original run: October 20, 2021 – July 9, 2025
- Volumes: 18
- Anime television series
- Directed by: Masahiro Hiraoka (S1); Toshinori Fukushima (S2)
- Written by: Shingo Nagai (S1); Michiko Yokote (S2)
- Music by: Makoto Miyazaki
- Studio: J.C.Staff; Moe (S1)
- Licensed by: Amazon Prime Video
- Original network: NNS (Nippon TV); BS NTV, AT-X
- Original run: October 4, 2024 – September 27, 2026
- Episodes: 24
- icon

Magilumiere Magical Girls Inc. (Japanese: 株式会社マジルミエ, Hepburn: Kabushiki Gaisha Majirumie), also known as Magilumiere Co. Ltd., is a Japanese manga series written by Sekka Iwata and illustrated by Yu Aoki. It was serialized by Shueisha and published on the Shōnen Jump+ website and mobile app from October 2021 to July 2025, with its chapters collected in eighteen tankōbon volumes. Shueisha also published the manga in English on their Manga Plus website and app. An anime television series adaptation produced by Moe and J.C.Staff aired from October to December 2024. A second season produced solely by J.C.Staff aired from July to September 2026.

== Plot ==
The story takes place in a world where being a magical girl is a popular profession that involves exterminating mysterious creatures called Kaii (怪異). New college graduate Kana Sakuragi, who is struggling with job hunting, is able to put her excellent memory to use and helps magical girl Hitomi Koshigaya exterminate a Kaii in an emergency. Happy she has finally been useful, Kana ends up becoming the second magical girl at Magilumiere Magical Girls Inc., the magical girl startup company Koshigaya works at.

In addition to the prodigy Hitomi, Magilumiere is composed of its president Kouji Shigemoto, a middle-aged man who dresses as a magical girl, Kaede Midorikawa, who deals with customers, and magic engineer Kazuo Nikoyama.

== Characters ==
The employees of Magilumiere from the first season. From left to right: Kaede Midorikawa, Kana Sakuragi, Kouji Shigemoto, Hitomi Koshigaya and Kazuo Nikoyama.

Kana Sakuragi (桜木 カナ, Sakuragi Kana)
Voiced by: Fairouz Ai (Japanese); Courtney Lin (season 1), Verina Kranak (season 2) (English)
Kana is new college graduate who is hired by Magilumiere after she assisted magical girl Hitomi Koshigaya. She has an excellent memory.
Hitomi Koshigaya (越谷 仁美, Koshigaya Hitomi)
Voiced by: Yumiri Hanamori (season 1), Mariko Hashiguchi (season 2) (Japanese); Jenny Yokobori (season 1), Bonnie Marie Williams (season 2) (English)
Hitomi is a magical girl who works at Magilumiere. She is a prodigy who is very supportive of Kana.
Kouji Shigemoto (重本 浩司, Shigemoto Kōji)
Voiced by: Rikiya Koyama (Japanese); Sean Burgos (English)
Shigemoto is the founder and president of Magilumiere. He is such a supporter of magical girls that he dresses like one at work.
Kaede Midorikawa (翠川 楓, Midorikawa Kaede)
Voiced by: Ryōta Ōsaka (Japanese); Alan Lee (season 1), Clifton Yada (season 2) (English)
Midorikawa is Magilumiere's marketing and sales representative.
Kazuo Nikoyama (二子山 和央, Nikoyama Kazuo)
Voiced by: Daiki Yamashita (Japanese); Alan Lee (season 1), Andy Luu (season 2) (English)
Nikoyama is Magilumiere's magic engineer. He takes his job so seriously that he has a tendency of being oblivious.
Mei Tsuchiba (土刃 メイ, Tsuchiba Mei)
Voiced by: Chika Anzai (Japanese); Stacy Ines (English)
Tsuchiba is a magical girl who works at AST. She has a cold personality and prefers the effectiveness of finishing her job over her own safety.
Kei Koga (古賀 圭, Koga Kei)
Voiced by: Akira Ishida (Japanese); Danny Fehsenfeld (English)
Koga is the founder and president of AST. He is an old friend of Shigemoto.
Lily Aoi (葵 リリー, Aoi Rirī)
Voiced by: Kaori Ishihara (Japanese); Juliana Sloan (English)
Lily is a magical girl who works at Miyakodo. She is a kind woman who is known for her beauty, elegance, and strength.
Miyako Asou (麻生 美弥子, Asō Miyako)
Voiced by: Kikuko Inoue (Japanese); Jo Yuan (English)
Miyako is the president of Miyakodo. She is an old friend of both Shigemoto and Koga.
Hana Ginji (銀次 ハナ, Ginji Hana)
Voiced by: Hiyori Kono (Japanese); Amber Aviles (season 1), Stacy Ines (season 2) (English)
Ginji is a BROOM engineer. She is a child genius who created Magilumiere's BROOMs.
Nishina (仁科)
Voiced by: Hiroshi Naka (Japanese); Hopper Stone (English)
Nishina is Ginji's assistant and caretaker. He was previously an engineer for the government.
Akane Makino (槇野 あかね, Makino Akane)
Voiced by: Yurina Amami (Japanese); Angelita Esperanza (season 1), Maggie Gagliardi (season 2) (English)
Makino is a magical girl who works at APDA. Kana is assigned to be her supervisor for her on-the-job training.
Kenji Koshigaya (越谷 憲司, Koshigaya Kenji)
Voiced by: Kōsuke Gotō (Japanese); Hopper Stone (English)
Kenji is Hitomi's estranged father who is the director of the Magical Power Agency and chairman of the Council of Magical Organizations (CMO).
Manda (萬田)
Voiced by: Taketora (Japanese); Robert Troy (season 1), William Salyers (season 2) (English)
Manda is the director of the Research Institute for Magical Technology (RIMT).
Iroha Akasaka (赤坂 いろは, Akasaka Iroha)
Voiced by: Sayumi Watabe (Japanese); Nicole Gose (English)
Akasaka is a magical girl who works as the assistant director of the RIMT.
Sakae Tonomori (塔ノ森 サカヱ, Tōnomori Sakae)
Voiced by: Manaka Iwami (Japanese); Aryia Touri, (Note: Touri is credited for voicing Tonomori in episodes 17, 19, and 20.) Felisha Wong, (Note: Wong is credited for voicing Tonomori in episode 18.) Verina Kranak (young) (English)
Tonomori is a young woman who is the 28th miko of the Tonomori Shrine. She is a childhood friend of Yaminori.
Hibiki Yamimori (闇森 響, Yamimori Hibiki)
Voiced by: Masaya Fukunishi, Natsuki Aikawa (young) (Japanese); Austin Kase, Bonnie Marie Williams (young) (English)
Yamimori is a college student who attends Kyoto Magic University (KMU). He is a childhood friend of Tonomori.
Yasuo Kamakura (鎌倉 康雄, Kamakura Yasuo)
Voiced by: Atsuki Tani (Japanese); Hooper Stone, (Note: Stone is credited for voicing Kamakura in episodes 13 and 14.) John Watkis (Note: Watkis is credited for voicing Kamakura from episodes 21 to 24.) (English)
A CMO member who is the chairman of the New Japan Magic Energy Association.
Sho Manao (真尾 笑, Manao Shō)
Voiced by: Yusuke Shirai (Japanese); Steve Tardio (English)
A mysterious man who is a former colleague of Shigemoto.

== Media ==
=== Manga ===
Written by Sekka Iwata and illustrated by Yu Aoki, Magilumiere Magical Girls Inc. was serialized on Shueisha's Shōnen Jump+ manga website and mobile app from October 20, 2021, to July 9, 2025. Shueisha collected its chapters in eighteen tankōbon volumes, released from February 4, 2022, to September 4, 2025. A special chapter was published on July 3, 2026.

Shueisha's Manga Plus service published the series in English digitally. Viz Media licensed the series in North America and began publishing it in early 2024.

==== Volumes ====
No.	Original release date	Original ISBN	English release date	English ISBN
1	February 4, 2022	978-4-08-883028-5	March 19, 2024	978-1-9747-4355-1
Chapter 1: "Welcome to Magilumiere" (株式会社マジルミエへようこそ, Kabushikigaisha Majirumie e Yōkoso) (Note: This chapter is titled "Welcome to Magilumiere Magical Girls Inc." in the English volume release.); Chapter 2: "'Cause Brooms Make a Clean Sweep" (ホーキなんて楽勝だから, Hōki Nante Rakushō Dakara) (Note: This chapter is titled "Riding Brooms Is a Piece of Cake" in the English volume release.); Chapter 3: "Execute Function" (業務実行, Gyōmu Jikkō) (Note: This chapter is titled "Execute Operation!" in the English volume release.); Chapter 4: "Once Again, Welcome to Magilumiere!" (改めてようこそマジルミエへ, Aratame to Yōkoso Majirumie e) (Note: This chapter is titled "Once Again, Welcome to Magilumiere Magical Girls Inc." in the English volume release.); Bonus: "Brand-New Bonus Comic" (描き下ろし番外編, Kakioroshi Bangai-hen)
2	May 2, 2022	978-4-08-883133-6	June 18, 2024	978-1-9747-4581-4
Chapter 5: "The Industry Leader in Magical Girls" (魔法少女業界の最大手, Mahō Shōjo Gyōkai no Saiōte) (Note: This chapter is titled "Big Shots of the Magical Girl World" in the English volume release.); Chapter 6: "Our Philosophy" (うちの美学, Uchi no Bigaku) (Note: This chapter is titled "Our Aesthetic" in the English volume release.); Chapter 7: "Idealistic, Inefficient Fools" (理想主義で非効率的なバカ, Risōshugi de Hikōritsutekina Baka) (Note: This chapter is titled "An Idealistic, Ineffectual Idiot" in the English volume release.); Chapter 8: "Idealists" (理想主義者, Risōshugi-sha); Chapter 9: "We Threw It Together, Huh?" (ホイホイできただろ, Hoihoi de Kitadaro) (Note: This chapter is titled "We Whipped It Up" in the English volume release.); Chapter 10: "Moments Like These" (こういう瞬間, Kōiu Shunkan) (Note: This chapter is titled "Times Like This" in the English volume release.); Chapter 11: "Business Collaboration" (協働業務, Kyōdō Gyōmu) (Note: This chapter is titled "Joint Operation" in the English volume release.); Chapter 12: "Miyakodo's Magical Girl" (ミヤコ堂の魔法少女, Miyakodō no Mahō Shōjo); Chapter 13: "Waterproof" (ウォータープルーフ, Wōtāpurūfu); Bonus: "Brand-New Bonus Comic" (描き下ろし番外編, Kakioroshi Bangai-hen)
3	July 4, 2022	978-4-08-883219-7	August 20, 2024	978-1-9747-4704-7
Chapter 14: "Smile" (笑って, Waratte) (Note: This chapter is titled "Smile!" in the English volume release.); Chapter 15: "Results vs. Philosophy" (結果と美学, Kekka to Bigaku) (Note: This chapter is titled "Aesthetic vs. Results" in the English volume release.); Chapter 16: "Trade Secrets" (企業秘密, Kigyō Himitsu) (Note: This chapter is titled "Classified Information" in the English volume release.); Chapter 17: "Magical Technology Expo" (魔法業界EXPO, Mahō Gyōkai Ekisupo) (Note: This chapter is titled "Magic Industry Expo" in the English volume release.); Chapter 18: "Off-Contract Jobs" (契約の無い仕事, Keiyaku no Nai Shigoto) (Note: This chapter is titled "Working Without a Contract" in the English volume release.); Chapter 19: "The Chills" (ゾッとする, Zottosuru) (Note: This chapter is titled "The Shivers" in the English volume release.); Chapter 20: "Colleagues" (仲間, Nakama) (Note: This chapter is titled "Friends" in the English volume release.); Chapter 21: "Cooperation" (協力, Kyōryoku); Chapter 22: "Merely a Startup" (単なるベンチャー, Tan'naru Benchā) (Note: This chapter is titled "A Mere Venture Company" in the English volume release.); Bonus: "Brand-New Bonus Comic" (描き下ろし番外編, Kakioroshi Bangai-hen)
4	September 2, 2022	978-4-08-883243-2	October 15, 2024	978-1-9747-4902-7
Chapter 23: "Ginji-San" (銀次さん) (Note: This chapter is titled "Dr. Ginji" in the English volume release.); Chapter 24: "Plan B" (プランB, Puran Bī); Chapter 25: "Super Awesome" (すっごくすごい, Suggoku Sugoi) (Note: This chapter is titled "Amazingly Amazing" in the English volume release.); Chapter 26: "A Knack for Reading Manuals" (説明書を読む才能, Setsumeisho o Yomu Sainō) (Note: This chapter is titled "A Talent for Reading Manuals" in the English volume release.); Chapter 27: "The Key to Our System" (システムの要, Shisutemu no Kaname); Chapter 28: "An Outside View" (会社の外側, Kaisha no Sotogawa) (Note: This chapter is titled "The Company from the Outside" in the English volume release.); Chapter 29: "The Dazzling Akane" (アカネ燦然, Akane Sanzen) (Note: This chapter is titled "Dazzling Akane" in the English volume release.); Chapter 30: "Leave It to Me!" (お任せあれ, O Makase Are) (Note: This chapter is titled "Leave It to Me" in the English volume release.); Chapter 31: "It'll Be Okay" (大丈夫, Daijōbu); Bonus: "Brand-New Bonus Comic" (描き下ろし番外編, Kakioroshi Bangai-hen)
5	November 4, 2022	978-4-08-883330-9	December 17, 2024	978-1-9747-4950-8
Chapter 32: "Solo vs. Teamwork" (1人とチーム, Hitori to Chīmu) (Note: This chapter is titled "Solo or Team" in the English volume release.); Chapter 33: "Watching Over You" (よく見てる, Yoku Miteru) (Note: This chapter is titled "Watch Closely" in the English volume release.); Chapter 34: "The Policy Meeting on Magical Girl Extermination Countermeasures Regarding Kaii Mutations" (魔法少女の怪異変異に対する退治対策方針会議, Mahō Shōjo no Kaii Hen'i ni Taisuru Taiji Taisaku Hōshin Kaigi) (Note: This chapter is titled "Meeting for Magical Girl Kaii Mutation Countermeasures" in the English volume release.); Chapter 35: "A Father's Job" (親の職業, Oya no Shokugyō) (Note: This chapter is titled "A Father's Work" in the English volume release.); Chapter 36: "A Daughter's Job" (子供の仕事, Kodomo no Shigoto) (Note: This chapter is titled "A Daughter's Work" in the English volume release.); Chapter 37: "An RIMT Woman" (魔総研の女, Ma Sōken no On'na) (Note: This chapter is titled "Magitech Woman" in the English volume release.); Chapter 38: "No Method of Extermination" (退治方法はありません, Taiji Hōhō wa Arimasen); Chapter 39: "Group C Kaii" (丙型怪異, Heigata Kaī) (Note: This chapter is titled "Type 3 Kaii" in the English volume release.); Chapter 40: "Producing Results" (実績作り, Jisseki Zukuri) (Note: This chapter is titled "Getting Results" in the English volume release.); Bonus: "Brand-New Bonus Comic" (描き下ろし番外編, Kakioroshi Bangai-hen)
6	February 3, 2023	978-4-08-883481-8	February 18, 2025	978-1-9747-5183-9
Chapter 41: "An Easy Place to Work" (働きやすい会社, Hataraki Yasui Kaisha) (Note: This chapter is titled "A Great Workplace" in the English volume release.); Chapter 42: "I Don't Have a Daughter" (娘などいない, Musume Nado Inai) (Note: This chapter is titled "I Have No Daughter" in the English volume release.); Chapter 43: "Cooperators" (協力者, Kyōryokusha) (Note: This chapter is titled "Collaborator" in the English volume release.); Chapter 44: "Kouji Shigemoto, Engineer" (エンジニア重本浩司, Enjinia Shigemoto Kōji) (Note: This chapter is titled "Koji Shigemoto, Engineer" in the English volume release.); Chapter 45: "Change of Plan" (作戦変更, Sakusen Henkō) (Note: This chapter is titled "Change of Strategy" in the English volume release.); Chapter 46: "Common Sense of the Frontlines" (現場の常識, Genba no Jōshiki) (Note: This chapter is titled "Battlefield Common Sense" in the English volume release.); Chapter 47: "Research and Execution" (研究と実践, Kenkyū to Jissen) (Note: This chapter is titled "Research and Practical Experience" in the English volume release.); Chapter 48: "Let's Go on a Blind Date!" (お見合いしましょう, O Miai Shimashou) (Note: This chapter is titled "Matchmaking" in the English volume release.); Chapter 49: "Sakuragi-senpai" (桜木先輩, Sakuragi Senpai) (Note: This chapter is titled "Sakuragi, Magical Girl Mentor" in the English volume release.); Bonus: "Brand-New Bonus Comic" (描き下ろし番外編, Kakioroshi Bangai-hen)
7	May 2, 2023	978-4-08-883540-2	April 15, 2025	978-1-9747-5245-4
Chapter 50: "Hibiki Yamimori" (闇森響, Yamimori Hibiki); Chapter 51: "Scatterbrain Hibiki-chan" (抜けとる響ちゃん, Nuketoru Hibiki-chan) (Note: This chapter is titled "Hibiki's Quirks" in the English volume release.); Chapter 52: "Tonomori's Kaii" (塔ノ森の怪異, Tonomori no Kaii) (Note: This chapter is titled "The Tonomori Kaii" in the English volume release.); Chapter 53: "The Safest Place" (一番安全, Ichiban Anzen) (Note: This chapter is titled "The Safest" in the English volume release.); Chapter 54: "15 Minutes" (15分, Jūgo Fun) (Note: This chapter is titled "Fifteen Minutes" in the English volume release.); Chapter 55: "Barriers" (結界, Kekkai) (Note: This chapter is titled "Barrier" in the English volume release.); Chapter 56: "Incredible Yamimori-kun" (すごい闇森くん, Sugoi Yamimori-kun) (Note: This chapter is titled "The Amazing Yamimori" in the English volume release.); Chapter 57: "Five Minutes to Pass the Baton" (引き継ぎ5分, Hikitsugi Gofun) (Note: This chapter is titled "Five More Minutes" in the English volume release.); Chapter 58: "I Can Do It Again!" (今回もできます, Konkai mo Dekimasu) (Note: This chapter is titled "We Can Do It Again" in the English volume release.); Chapter 59: "Flawless Work" (完璧な仕事, Kanpekina Shigoto) (Note: This chapter is titled "Perfect Work" in the English volume release.); Bonus: "Brand-New Bonus Comic" (描き下ろし番外編, Kakioroshi Bangai-hen)
8	August 4, 2023	978-4-08-883679-9	June 17, 2025	978-1-9747-5509-7
Chapter 60: "Hibiki-chan's Job Search" (響ちゃんの就活, Hibiki-chan no Shūkatsu) (Note: This chapter is titled "Hibiki's Job Hunt" in the English volume release.); Chapter 61: "Manao and Shigemoto" (真尾と重本, Manao to Shigemoto); Chapter 62: "Industry Standards" (業界の常識, Gyōkai no Jōshiki); Chapter 63: "That's Work" (それが仕事, Sore ga Shigoto); Chapter 64: "Top-Secret Operation" (社外秘作戦, Shagai Hisakusen) (Note: This chapter is titled "Secret Away Mission" in the English volume release.); Chapter 65: "Friendship, 17 Years in the Making" (17年越しのともだち, 17-nen Goshino Tomodashi) (Note: This chapter is titled "Seventeen Years of Friendship" in the English volume release.); Chapter 66: "Showtime" (ショータイム, Shōtaimu); Chapter 67: "Dazzling" (ギンギラギン, Gingingin) (Note: This chapter is titled "The Dazzling Light" in the English volume release.); Chapter 68: "Wings, Released" ("Wing"出動, Uingu Shutsudō) (Note: This chapter is titled "Deploy Wing" in the English volume release.); Bonus: "Brand-New Bonus Comic" (描き下ろし番外編, Kakioroshi Bangai-hen)
9	October 4, 2023	978-4-08-883734-5	August 19, 2025	978-1-9747-5510-3
Chapter 69: "Plan B" (プランB, Puran Bi); Chapter 70: "The Value of Work" (仕事の価値, Shigoto no Kachi); Chapter 71: "Barley Spice" (プリハトムギ, Purihatomugi) (Note: This chapter is titled "Princess Barley" in the English volume release.); Chapter 72: "This Is No Fairytale" (フィクションじゃない, Fikushon Janai) (Note: This chapter is titled "This Isn't Fiction" in the English volume release.); Chapter 73: "Prepare to Combine" (合体準備, Gattai Junbi) (Note: This chapter is titled "Prepare to Merge" in the English volume release.); Chapter 74: "Non-Fiction" (ノンフィクション, Nonfikushon) (Note: This chapter is titled "Nonfiction" in the English volume release.); Chapter 75: "We're Here for You" (たすけにきたよ, Tasuke ni Kitayo) (Note: This chapter is titled "Here to Help" in the English volume release.); Chapter 76: "Friends" (ともだち, Tomodachi); Chapter 77: "Collapse" (崩壊, Hōkai); Bonus: "Brand-New Bonus Comic" (番外編, Bangai-hen)
10	December 4, 2023	978-4-08-883735-2	November 18, 2025	978-1-9747-5892-0
Chapter 78: "A Sacred Vow" (願掛け, Gankake) (Note: This chapter is titled "Make a Wish" in the English volume release.); Chapter 79: "Restart" (再会, Saikai) (Note: This chapter is titled "Reunion" in the English volume release.); Chapter 80: "I Believe" (信じてる, Shinjiteru) (Note: This chapter is titled "Trust" in the English volume release.); Chapter 81: "The Weight of a Year" (1年の重み, Ichinen no Omomi); Chapter 82: "Sakuragi Planning" (桜木企画, Sakuragi Kikaku); Chapter 83: "Message" (メッセージ, Messēji); Chapter 84: "Response" (レスポンス, Resuponsu); Chapter 85: "All Kinds of People" (いろんな人, Iron'na Hito) (Note: This chapter is titled "All Kinds" in the English volume release.); Chapter 86: "Betting It All on a Dark Horse" (大穴狙い, Ōana Nerai) (Note: This chapter is titled "Long Shot" in the English volume release.); Chapter 87: "Victory Prospects and Business Avenues" (勝機と商機, Shōki to Shōki) (Note: This chapter is titled "Chance to Do Business, Chance to Succeed" in the English volume release.); Bonus: "Brand-New Bonus Comic" (描き下ろし番外編, Kakioroshi Bangai-hen)
11	April 4, 2024	978-4-08-884003-1	January 20, 2026	978-1-9747-6187-6
Chapter 88: "Kamakura-san's House Party" (鎌倉サンのホームパーティー, Kamakura-san no Hōmupātī) (Note: This chapter is titled "Mr. Kamakura's House Party" in the English volume release.); Chapter 89: "A Grand Assembly" (饗宴, Kyōen) (Note: This chapter is titled "Banquet" in the English volume release.); Chapter 90: "Rabbit" (Note: Stylized in all caps.); Chapter 91: "Infiltration" (潜入, Sen'nyū) (Note: This chapter is titled "Undercover" in the English volume release.); Chapter 92: "Responsibility and Results" (責任と結果, Sekinin to Kekka) (Note: This chapter is titled "Responsibilities and Results" in the English volume release.); Chapter 93: "Fist of Midorikawa" (翠川の拳, Midorikawa no Ken) (Note: Originally titled "Restart" (再会, Saikai) when released on Shōnen Jump+.) (Note: This chapter is titled "Midorikawa's Fist" in the English volume release.); Chapter 94: "A Promise" (約束, Yakusoku) (Note: This chapter is titled "Promise" in the English volume release.); Chapter 95: "Vow" (誓い, Chikai) (Note: This chapter is titled "Pledge" in the English volume release.); Chapter 96: "Welcome to Magilumiere" (株式会社マジルミエへようこそ, Kabushikigaisha Majirumie e Yōkoso); Bonus: "Magilumiere the Anime Commemorative Manga" (アニメ化記念まんが, Anime-ka Kinen Manga); Bonus: "Brand-New Bonus Comic" (描き下ろし番外編, Kakioroshi Bangai-hen)
12	June 4, 2024	978-4-08-884058-1	March 17, 2026	978-1-9747-6236-1
Chapter 97: "Kaii Control Chip" (怪異操作チップ, Kaii Sōsa Chippu); Chapter 98: "MP-Charge-Kun" (魔力ためるくん, Maryokutameru-kun) (Note: This chapter is titled "Mr. Magic Charger" in the English volume release.); Chapter 99: "Gratitude" (労い, Negirai) (Note: This chapter is titled "Reward" in the English volume release.); Chapter 100: "A Fun Job" (楽しい仕事, Tanoshī Shigoto); Chapter 101: "Ruin and Revival" (破壊と復活, Hakai to Fukkatsu) (Note: This chapter is titled "Destruction and Recovery" in the English volume release.); Chapter 102: "Reopen" (再開, Saikai) (Note: This chapter is titled "Reopening" in the English volume release.); Chapter 103: "Magikyu!!" (マジキュー!!, Majikyū!!); Chapter 104: "'Tis Time for 'Torture,' Kurairi-sama" (蔵入様、拷問の時間です, Kurairi-sama, Gōmon no Jikan desu) (Note: This chapter is titled "Master Kurairi, It's Torture Time" in the English volume release.); Chapter 105: "Culmination" (集大成, Shūtaisei); Bonus: "Brand-New Bonus Comic" (番外編, Bangai-hen)
13	September 4, 2024	978-4-08-884201-1	June 16, 2026	978-1-9747-6315-3
Chapter 106: "On Thin Ice" (薄氷, Haku Hyō) (Note: This chapter is titled "Thin Ice" in the English volume release.); Chapter 107: "Proposals and Negotiations" (提案と交渉, Teian to Kōshō) (Note: This chapter is titled "Proposal and Negotiations" in the English volume release.); Chapter 108: "On the Front Lines" (現場と仕事, Genba to Shigoto) (Note: This chapter is titled "Frontline Operations" in the English volume release.); Chapter 109: "Kaii Calamity" (災害怪異, Saigai Kaii) (Note: This chapter is titled "Calamity Kaii" in the English volume release.); Chapter 110: "Elite Battalion" (多数精鋭, Tasū Seiei) (Note: This chapter is titled "Massive Elite Force" in the English volume release.); Chapter 111: "Joint Operation" (共同作業, Kyōdō Sagyō); Chapter 112: "16 Years Ago" (16年前, Jū Roku-nen Mae) (Note: This chapter is titled "Sixteen Years Ago" in the English volume release.); Chapter 113: "Alice and Koga" (アリスと古賀, Arisu to Koga); Chapter 114: "Magilumiere" (マジルミエ, Majirumie); Chapter 115: "Kei Koga" (古賀圭, Koga Kei); Bonus: "Brand-New Bonus Comic" (番外編, Bangai-hen)
14	October 4, 2024	978-4-08-884230-1	August 18, 2026	978-1-9747-6316-0
Chapter 116: "Waiting" (待つてた, Matsuteta); Chapter 117: "New Structure" (新体制, Shin Taisei) (Note: This chapter is titled "New Administration" in the English volume release.); Chapter 118: "Endings and Beginnings" (終わりと始まり, Owari to Hajimari); Chapter 119: "Let's Get Lunch" (ランチをしましょう, Ranchi o Shimashou) (Note: This chapter is titled "Let's Have Lunch" in the English volume release.); Chapter 120: "Let's Eat Barbecue" (焼肉をしましょう, Yakiniku o Shimashou) (Note: This chapter is titled "Let's Have a Barbecue" in the English volume release.); Chapter 121: "Teamwork" (チームワーク, Chīmuwāku); Chapter 122: "Hot-Blooded Amateur Baseball! Blaze Forth With Passion!" (熱闘草野球! ~燃やせ、雑草魂を~, Nettō Kusayakyū! ~Moyase, Zassō Damashī o~) (Note: This chapter is titled "Red-Hot Amateur Baseball! Fry the Weeds!" in the English volume release.); Chapter 123: "Hot-Blooded Amateur Baseball! Who Will the Stars Shine Down On?" (熱闘草野球! ~暁の一番星は誰の上に輝く~, Nettō Kusayakyū! ~Akatsuki no Ichiban Hoshi wa Dare no Ue ni Kagayaku~?) (Note: This chapter is titled "Red-Hot Amateur Baseball! For Whom Doth Shine the First Morning Star?" in the English volume release.); Bonus: Four Short Episodes (4本立て, Yon Hontate); Bonus: First Character Popularity Vote Results (第1回キャラクター人気投票結果発表, Daiikkai Kyarakutā Ninki Tōhyō Kekka Happyō)
15	January 4, 2025	978-4-08-884293-6	October 20, 2026	978-1-9747-6317-7
Chapter 124: "Time to Head Home" (おうちへ帰ろう, O Uchi e Kaerō) (Note: This chapter is titled "Let's Go Home" in the English volume release.); Chapter 125: "Pipe Dreams" (夢物語, Yume Monogatari) (Note: This chapter is titled "A Distance Dream" in the English volume release.); Chapter 126: "Future and Past" (未来と過去, Mirai to Kako); Chapter 127: "Adult Obligations" (大人の役目, Otona no Yakume) (Note: This chapter is titled "Adult Responsibilities" in the English volume release.); Chapter 128: "The Untold Development of Hibiki Yamimori Part 1" (闇森響開発秘話 (1), Yamimori Hibiki Kaihatsu Hiwa Ichi) (Note: This chapter is titled "The Secret Chronicle of Hibiki Yamimori's Design, Part 1" in the English volume release.); Chapter 129: "The Untold Development of Hibiki Yamimori Part 2" (闇森響開発秘話 (2), Yamimori Hibiki Kaihatsu Hiwa Ni) (Note: This chapter is titled "The Secret Chronicle of Hibiki Yamimori's Design, Part 2" in the English volume release.); Chapter 130: "The Untold Development of Hibiki Yamimori Part 3" (闇森響開発秘話 (3), Yamimori Hibiki Kaihatsu Hiwa San) (Note: This chapter is titled "The Secret Chronicle of Hibiki Yamimori's Design, Part 3" in the English volume release.); Chapter 131: "Advance or Remain" (進むか止まるか, Susumu ka Tomaru ka) (Note: This chapter is titled "To Advance or to Stop" in the English volume release.); Chapter 132: "Remain or Protect" (止まるか守るか, Tomaru ka Mamoru ka) (Note: This chapter is titled "To Stop or to Protect" in the English volume release.); Chapter 133: "Eternal Moments" (永遠の瞬間, Eien no Shunkan) (Note: This chapter is titled "Eternal Moment" in the English volume release.); Bonus: "Brand-New Bonus Comic" (描き下ろし番外編, Kakioroshi Bangai-hen)
16	April 4, 2025	978-4-08-884549-4	December 15, 2026	978-1-9747-6318-4
Chapter 134: "Exciting, Isn't It?" (ワクワクするわね, Wakuwaku Suru Wane); Chapter 135: "The 20th Annual Magical Girl Industry Commemoration Ceremony" (魔法少女民営化二十周年式典, Mahō Shōjo Min'eika ni Jū-shūnen Shikiten); Chapter 136: "Program 01" (プログラム第一, Puroguramu Daiichi); Chapter 137: "Revealing the Results of Research" (実験結果発表, Jikken Kekka Happyō); Chapter 138: "A Job for Adults" (大人の仕事, Otona no Shigoto); Chapter 139: "A Research Presentation" (研究結果発表, Kenkyū Kekka Happyō); Chapter 140: "Second Phase" (プログラム第二, Puroguramu Daini); Chapter 141: "My Magic" (私の魔法, Watashi no Mahō); Chapter 142: "Rock Bottom" (どん底, Donzoko); Bonus: "Brand-New Bonus Comic" (描き下ろし番外編, Kakioroshi Bangai-hen)
17	June 4, 2025	978-4-08-884641-5	February 16, 2027	978-1-9747-6319-1
Chapter 143: "The Magic of Hibiki Yamimori" (闇森響の魔法, Yamimori Hibiki no Mahō); Chapter 144: "Fresh Magic" (若い魔法, Wakai Mahō); Chapter 145: "Manao's Tears" (真尾の涙, Manao no Namida); Chapter 146: "Mealtime" (食事, Shokuji); Chapter 147: "Ambition" (望み, Nozomi); Chapter 148: "A Request for Cooperation" (協力要請, Kyōryoku Yōsei); Chapter 149: "Kana Sakuragi's Keynote Speech" (桜木カナのスピーチ, Sakuragi Kana no Supīchi); Chapter 150: "A Job for Magical Girls" (魔法少女の仕事, Mahō Shōjo no Shigoto); Chapter 151: "A Fleeting Dream" (泡沫の夢, Utakata no Yume)
18	September 4, 2025	978-4-08-884736-8	—	—
Chapter 152: "My Magic" (僕の魔法, Boku no Mahō); Chapter 153: "Kana's Magic" (カナの魔法, Kana no Mahō); Chapter 154: "The Final Magic" (最後の魔法, Saigo no Mahō); Chapter 155: "Endings and Beginnings Part 1" (終わりと始まり①, Owari to Hajimari 1); Chapter 156: "Endings and Beginnings Part 2" (終わりと始まり②, Owari to Hajimari 2); Chapter 157: "Endings and Beginnings Part 3" (終わりと始まり③, Owari to Hajimari 3); Chapter 158: "Magical Days" (魔法の日々, Mahō no Hibi); Chapter 159: "The Ideal Magical Girl" (あこがれの魔法少女, Akogare no Mahō Shōjo); Chapter 160: "You Are..." (あなたはとても, Anata wa Totemo); Bonus: "Brand-New Bonus Comic" (描き下ろし番外編, Kakioroshi Bangai-hen)

=== Anime ===
An anime television series adaptation was announced on November 29, 2023. It was produced by Moe and J.C.Staff and directed by Masahiro Hiraoka, with scripts written by Shingo Nagai, character designs handled by Hidehiro Asama, and music composed by Makoto Miyazaki. The series aired from October 4 to December 20, 2024, on the Friday Anime Night programming block on Nippon TV and its affiliates. The opening theme song is "Order Made" (オーダーメイド, Ōdāmeido), performed by Mafumafu, while the ending theme song is "Workout" (ワークアウト, Wākuauto), performed by syudou. Amazon Prime Video licensed the series for global streaming.

Following the airing of the final episode of the first season, a second season was announced, which was produced solely by J.C.Staff and directed by Toshinori Fukushima, with Michiko Yokote writing the scripts. The season aired from July 5 to September 27, 2026. (Note: Nippon TV listed the season premiere on July 4 at 24:55, which is effectively July 5 at 12:55 a.m. JST.) The opening theme song is "Latte Magic" (ラテマジック, Rate Majikku), performed by syudou and Yusei Yagi from Fantastics from Exile Tribe, while the ending theme song is "BooooM!!!", performed by Houshou Marine.

==== Episodes ====
===== Season 1 (2024) =====
No. overall	No. in season	Title	Directed by (Note: Production staff information is taken from the ending credits of each episode.)	Storyboarded by	Original release date
1	1	"Welcome to Magilumiere Magical Girls Inc."; Transliteration: "Kabushiki Gaisha Majirumie e Yōkoso" (Japanese: 株式会社マジルミエへようこそ)	Masahiro Hiraoka	Masahiro Hiraoka	October 4, 2024
Despite having a strong memory and attention to detail, Kana Sakuragi struggles to land a job after graduation. However, her latest job interview at a big company is put on hold when the building is invaded by a large Kaii that freezes the entire room. Hitomi Koshigaya of the small magical girl company Magilumiere is called in to deal with the threat, but upon seeing the size of the Kaii, asks for a volunteer to help her reload her weapon. Kana offers her help, even adjusting Hitomi's ammo to a form more suited to damage the icy Kaii until Koshigaya manages to seal it. As thanks, Hitomi recommends Kana for a job at Magilumiere Magical Girls Inc.
2	2	"Cause BROOMs Are a Piece of Cake"; Transliteration: "Hōki nan te Rakushō da kara" (Japanese: ホーキなんて楽勝だから)	Nana Fujiwara	Akira Naito & Masahiro Hiraoka	October 11, 2024
Kana meets the eccentric staff of the Magilumiere office: the cross-dressing manager Kouji Shigemoto, overworked secretary Kaede Midorikawa, and technical/magical designer Kazuo Nikoyama. Kana tries to train in the use of her BROOM but Hitomi's methods are unhelpful and she continues crashing into objects. Suddenly, Magilumiere is called upon to deal with a new Kaii that has spread through an entire floor of an office building and trapped one of the workers inside. Hitomi takes Kana with her and manages to rescue the civilian, but is having trouble warding off the Kaii while carrying him, as her damaged BROOM slowly loses power. Kana then remembers that her BROOM can be converted into a short-range weapon from the training manuals that no one else bothered to read, and uses it to damage the Kaii enough for Hitomi to seal it while rescuing the civilian.
3	3	"Our Aesthetic"; Transliteration: "Uchi no Bigaku" (Japanese: ウチの美学)	Fumihiro Ueno	Junichi Sakata, Masahiro Hiraoka & Yoshikazu Miyao	October 18, 2024
Kana gets officially hired as a full-time employee at Magilumiere after a month, as a magical girl from the massive AST company seals their latest Kaii target from under them. Later, Magilumiere is called in to clear a nearby shopping district of small yet numerous aquatic Kaii that have taken over. Kana suggests following the standard tactic of a wide-range magic spell to quickly resolve the issue, but both Shigemoto and Hitomi insist she scope out the area first. Initially confused about the situation, Kana soon realizes that the district is full of old buildings that will be destroyed if they go through with the spell. As such, Kana proposes a more targeted magic that will wipe out the Kaii through the sewers, though such a spell does not yet exist. Shigemoto announces he will create one.
4	4	"Whipped up a Good One!"; Transliteration: "Hoihoi deki ta daro" (Japanese: ホイホイできただろ)	Kazuma Komatsu	Hiroshi Ikehata, Masahiro Hiraoka & Yoshikazu Miyao	October 25, 2024
Hitomi reassures Kana that Magilumiere is capable of creating a new spell on the spot. Elsewhere, Kei Koga, the founder and president of AST, and his assistant Hasegawa have a conversation about Shigemoto, while the magical girl Kana and Koshigaya previously encountered seals another Kaii. Back at the shopping district, once the spell is ready, Kana eventually realizes the Kaii are located at a manhole near the entrance. When she and Hitomi arrive there, the latter uses the spell to finish the Kaii off. Following the battle, the grateful residents give Kana and Hitomi numerous gifts. They then head back to Magilumiere.
5	5	"Joint Project"; Transliteration: "Kyōdō Gyōmu" (Japanese: 協働業務)	Makoto Sokuza	Masahiro Hiraoka, Akira Naito & Yoshikazu Miyao	November 1, 2024
Following the latest workday, Shigemoto announces that the company is going to have a karaoke party. At the karaoke bar, almost everyone has sung except Midorikawa, which Kana notices. The next day, Shigemoto receives a phone call during lunch. He soon informs Kana that he wants her to participate in a joint project for a week with Miyakodo, a large cosmetics manufacturer that has its own magical girl department. He also informs her that the president, Miyako Asou, is an old friend of his. Once she arrives at Miyakodo, Kana is partnered with another magical girl named Lily Aoi.
6	6	"Miyakodo's Magical Girl"; Transliteration: "Miyakodō no Mahō Shōjo" (Japanese: ミヤコ堂の魔法少女)	Teru Ishii	Teru Ishii, Masahiro Hiraoka & Yoshikazu Miyao	November 8, 2024
Lily goes on a shopping trip with Kana. While taking a break, the former reveals the trip is actually a form of training. She also explains how the perception of magical girls has changed over the years. Once the trip is over with, they head to Hotel Alberic to do a routine Kaii inspection. Meanwhile, Shigemoto, Midorikawa and Nikoyama discuss how the joint project will be a good opportunity for Kana. Back at Hotel Alberic, Lily decides to check out the demolition site nearby. When Kana eventually joins her, they discover a large Kaii is at the location. They appear to have the upper hand against the Kaii until it undergoes a mutation. Lily is then attacked while trying to protect Kana.
7	7	"Results vs. Aesthetic"; Transliteration: "Kekka to Bigaku" (Japanese: 結果と美学)	Kōzō Kaihō	Yōhei Suzuki, Masahiro Hiraoka & Yoshikazu Miyao	November 15, 2024
Lily reassures Kana after she only receives a scratch. Just then, the magical girl Kana previously encountered, Mei Tsuchiba, arrives as backup. Tsuchiba takes on the Kaii while Kana and Lily evacuate the bystanders. Kana soon returns to the demolition site where she offers to help Tsuchiba, which the latter refuses. When she does it anyway, Tsuchiba criticizes Kana's aesthetic before she successfully neutralizes the Kaii. Once Tsuchiba leaves, Kana expresses her self-doubt to Lily. In response, Lily reveals what her aesthetic is, which motivates Kana. Following the conclusion of the joint project, Kana and Lily say their goodbyes. Elsewhere, Shigemoto has a meeting with Miyako while Koga and Hasegawa discuss what happened at the demolition site.
8	8	"Magical Technology EXPO"; Transliteration: "Mahō Gyōkai Ekisupo" (Japanese: 魔法業界EXPO)	Nana Fujiwara	Akira Naito, Masahiro Hiraoka & Yoshikazu Miyao	November 22, 2024
Kana reunites with her coworkers at the annual Magical Technology EXPO. Inside, Kana and Hitomi are approached by two men. Once they leave, a previously nervous Nikoyama excitedly reveals that the men are the legendary product managers from Direct Core named Kashinomi and Yokode. Everyone except Midorikawa then attend Satisfac's keynote speech where Masayuki Oikawa, the CEO, provides a demonstration of a mutated plant-type Kaii being exterminated. However, things go awry when the Kaii continues to mutate. Koga decides to not do anything until his company is contractually obligated to do so. Knowing how AST operates, Shigemoto has Magilumiere step up to the task. As Kana, Hitomi, and Nikoyama work together, the latter realizes that his laptop is too slow to effectively send the spell needed to stop the Kaii.
9	9	"Colleagues"; Transliteration: "Nakama" (Japanese: 仲間)	Fumihiro Ueno	Junichi Sakata & Masahiro Hiraoka	November 29, 2024
While Nikoyama is panicking, a flashback shows how his passion for magic ultimately led to him being hired by Magilumiere. Back in the present, Nikoyama asks Kashinomi, Yokode, and Oikawa for their assistance. Thanks to the collaboration, Nikoyama is able to send the spell to Kana and Hitomi, who use it to neutralize the Kaii. Afterward, Oikawa wonders how Shigemoto created a middleware containing an anti-mutation code he has never seen. Koga later tries to poach Kana and Hitomi, which is unsuccessful. When Shigemoto mentions an incident that occurred fifteen years ago, a furious Koga leaves the room. Oikawa then has a private conversation with Shigemoto concerning all the things he has noticed about Magilumiere. Following the meeting, Shigemoto tells Midorikawa it is time for Plan B.
10	10	"Ginji"; Transliteration: "Ginji-san" (Japanese: 銀次さん)	Shūji Miyazaki	Shūji Miyazaki & Masahiro Hiraoka	December 6, 2024
Shigemoto tells Kana and Hitomi he wants them to get their BROOMs tuned up. Arriving at the destination, they meet Hana Ginji, a child genius, and her assistant and caretaker Nishina. Once Kana and Hitomi return to the office, Shigemoto reveals he is going to expand the business thanks to a video Midorikawa uploaded of them at the EXPO. The next day, Ginji and Nishina show up at Magilumiere to give Kana and Hitomi their BROOMs back. Afterward, Shigemoto organizes a meeting about the latest extermination request where a property owner wants them to check out a building in Tawarahiyori. As Ginji monitors their progress, Kana uses her BROOM's updated features to its fullest to neutralize the Kaii. Shigemoto later reveals another company's magical girl will be loaned to Magilumiere and he asks Kana to serve as her mentor.
11	11	"The Dazzling Akane"; Transliteration: "Akane Sanzen" (Japanese: アカネ燦然)	Makoto Sokuza	Kōichi Takada & Masahiro Hiraoka	December 13, 2024
Once Kana accepts the assignment, Shigemoto reveals the magical girl works for APDA. Said magical girl, Akane Makino, then arrives at the building. During lunch, Makino tells Kana about an incident that occurred fifteen years ago called the Kaii Calamity. The next day, Kana, Hitomi and Makino head to a redevelopment district. There, Kana explains to Makino how the company operates. Hitomi decides to investigate the first seven buildings, leaving Kana and Makino to investigate the rest. Although they have seemingly completed the task, Nikoyama reports a faint Kaii signal is still in the area. When everyone splits up again, Hitomi realizes the Kaii they are dealing with is actually a blaze-type not an electric-type. As a result, Kana rescues Makino. The Kaii proceeds to mutate before it can be contained.
12	12	"Solo vs. Teamwork"; Transliteration: "Hitori to Chīmu" (Japanese: 一人とチーム)	Kōzō Kaihō	Kōichi Ōhata & Masahiro Hiraoka	December 20, 2024
Kana, Hitomi, and Makino are forced to stall until Magilumiere has enough data to create a spell. While Kana is flying around, a flashback reveals the reason why Shigemoto wanted her to be Makino's mentor. Back in the present, Kana is able to send the data to Nikoyama. Hitomi soon arrives at the last moment to rescue Kana and Makino. Noticing the teamwork on display, a determined Makino comes up with a strategy. After a while, they finally neutralize the Kaii. Kana and Makino continue to work together for a month before they say their goodbyes. The next day, Shigemoto attends a Council of Magical Organizations (CMO) meeting.

===== Season 2 (2026) =====
No. overall	No. in season	Title	Directed by	Storyboarded by	Original release date
13	1	"A Legitimate Job Admired by Everyone"; Transliteration: "Daremoga Akogareru Rippana Hitotsu no Shokugyō" (Japanese: 誰もが憧れる立派なひとつの職業)	Kōzō Kaihō	Iku Suzuki	July 5, 2026
Shigemoto's Alice System is rejected by the other council members due to ineffective results. A determined Shigemoto then proposes letting his company exterminate a new Kaii species the Research Institute for Magical Technology (RIMT) has in its possession, which is agreed upon by nearly everyone except for Kenji Koshigaya, Hitomi's estranged father who is the director of the Magical Power Agency and chairman of the CMO. Once Shigemoto returns to the office, he informs his employees of their next assignment. That night, Hitomi is approached by a mysterious figure who tells her to choose between ditching her father and sabotaging her upcoming job. The next day, Shigemoto reveals a magical girl from the RIMT will be assisting them. During lunch, Hitomi explains her dilemma to Kana. Afterward, Hitomi recalls her father's disapproval of her wanting to be a magical girl before she and Kana arrive at the RIMT's headquarters.
14	2	"No Logical Means of Exterminating This Kaii"; Transliteration: "Kono Kaii ni Taiji Hōhō wa Gozaimasen no" (Japanese: この怪異に退治方法はございませんの)	Hiroyasu Oda	Kōichi Takada	July 12, 2026
Kana and Hitomi are greeted by Manda and Iroha Akasaka, the assistant director. Akasaka then reveals she is the magical girl who will be assisting them. When the trio arrives at the quarantine area, they are informed that Kenji and Professor Tsutsumi from KO University, the same man who approached Hitomi, will be monitoring the extermination. Akasaka proceeds to explain the history of Class A and Class B Kaii before she introduces the newly discovered Class C Kaii to Kana and Hitomi. A flashback reveals Kana told Shigemoto and Midorikawa about Hitomi's dilemma. Back in the present, the Kaii undergoes a mutation. Once this happens, Tsutsumi reveals he summoned Tsuchiba to exterminate it. He also uses the situation as an opportunity to negotiate with Kenji.
15	3	"Haven't Seen Delusion Like This in Ages"; Transliteration: "Kōiu Ichamon wa Hisabisa Dana" (Japanese: こういうイチャモンは久々だな)	Kanta Shiba	Kōichi Takada	July 19, 2026
Hitomi realizes Tsutsumi had the situation planned the whole time. Just then, Tsuchiba arrives to exterminate the Kaii. A flashback reveals the circumstances that led to Hitomi being hired by Magilumiere as their inaugural magical girl. Back in the present, Hitomi and Kenji refuse to back down when they are confronted by Tsuchiba and Tsutsumi, respectively, claiming they are not related. Kenji soon calls AST to inform them that their order has been canceled. While Tsuchiba initially declines to help out anyway due to her and Hitomi's previous interactions, Kana is able to persuade her by mentioning the valuable data she will gain for her company. Once Shigemoto participates in the operation, everybody is ready to deal with the Kaii.
16	4	"How Exceptional His Magical Girls Are"; Transliteration: "Yoppodo Ii Mahō Shōjo to Hataraite Iru n desu yo" (Japanese: よっぽどいい魔法少女と働いてるんですよ)	Tomohiro Matsukawa	Hiroyasu Oda	July 26, 2026
While Shigemoto deploys additional magic effects, Tsuchiba still expresses her distrust for Magilumiere. Meanwhile, everyone else is impressed by the countermeasures Shigemoto is using to deal with the Kaii. A flashback reveals Kenji warned Shigemoto that they earned money in their line of work by using magical girls as bait when the latter mentioned his company was scouting Hitomi. Back in the present, once Tsuchiba exposes the flaw in Hitomi's strategy, Kana decides to have them work together. Tsutsumi is incredulous about the Alice System succeeding until Manda points out Kana's leadership. As a result, the Kaii is exterminated. Afterward, a secretly impressed Tsuchiba leaves the building while Kenji acknowledges the potential of the Alice System. Kenji soon thanks Hitomi and Kana for their hard work. That evening, Magilumiere has a party.
17	5	"Can't Keep Acting Like a Rookie"; Transliteration: "Itsumademo Shinjin Kibun ja Irarenai" (Japanese: いつまでも新人気分じゃいられない)	Toshiteru Masamoto	Yōhei Suzuki	August 2, 2026
At the office, Kana and Hitomi overhear their male coworkers discuss the criteria they want their new engineer to have. Due to Kana being the newest employee, Shigemoto arranges for her to take an interview with a staffing agency that is making the recruitment ads. She then has a meeting with Gou Hakamada from the recruitment website Magic Navi. Following the interview, Magilumiere receive numerous applications. Both Makino and Akasaka soon join the company as their newest magical girls. Three months later, Shigemoto finally finds an engineer candidate he wants to interview in person. In Kyoto, Magilumiere head to Kyoto Magic University (KMU). They then meet up with Sakae Tonomori, the 28th miko of the Tonomori Shrine. Tonomori proceeds to introduce Magilumiere to her childhood friend Hibiki Yamimori, the same engineer the company is going to interview.
18	6	"You're Not Fit for This Job"; Transliteration: "Anata, Kono Shigoto Muitenai wa yo" (Japanese: あなた、この仕事向いてないわよ)	Kanta Shiba	Daisuke Tsukushi	August 9, 2026
Yamimori is surprised to see Magilumiere sooner than he expected. He explains that he is so good at what he does that prefers working over studying. Once he is alone, however, Yamimori reveals the real reason he chose to attend KMU. Meanwhile, Tonomori tells Magilumiere about a festival that will take place at the shrine immediately following the interview. She then summons Igni, a legendary Class B Kaii. Afterward, Makino and Yamimori have a heated conversation over the latter's attitude. The next day, Shigemoto gives a lecture at KMU by himself while everybody else goes to the festival. During the lecture, Shigemoto notices an acquaintance who he thought was still in prison. Elsewhere, a mysterious man is sitting on a tree branch near the shrine.
19	7	"The Battle's Already Over"; Transliteration: "Dō Kangae Temo Gēmu Setto Desho" (Japanese: どう考えてもゲームセットでしょ)	Yuki Morita	Kōichi Takada	August 16, 2026
The mysterious man fires a shot at the shrine while Yamimori is monitoring and protecting it. Once the festival is over with, an earth-type Kaii invades the shrine. As a result, Tonomori, Makino, Akasaka, Yamimori and numerous civilians are trapped in its overwritten barrier. The man then fires another shot that reinforces both the barrier and Kaii. Just as the Kaii is about to attack a weakened Tonomori, a flashback shows Tonomori and Yamimori's friendship as they grew up, the self-confidence issues Yamimori had been dealing with, and the reason why he applied for the engineer job at Magilumiere. Back in the present, Tonomori is saved by a returning Igni. Nikoyama manages to contact Yamimori after he manually hacked the barrier.
20	8	"You Can Choose Where to Grow Up"; Transliteration: "Ichininmae ni Naru Basho wa Eraberu Nya" (Japanese: 一人前になる場所は選べるんや)	Yutaka Yamamoto	Mashami Watanabe	August 23, 2026
When Nikoyama tells Yamimori to have Tonomori use Igni so they can break the barrier, Yamimori replies this plan will not work due to Tonomori being unconscious. Nikoyama suggests using Makino and Akasaka instead. He then gives Yamimori some encouraging words before communication cuts out. Following Nikoyama's advice, Yamimori asks Makino and Akasaka for their assistance. However, not only does the Kaii returns, but Makino and Akasaka's transformation wears off. Once Makino and Akasaka regain their powers, they team up with Igni to exterminate the Kaii. Later that night, Shigemoto has a meeting with his employees. Meanwhile, Yamimori has a conversation with Tonomori before he is informed by Midorikawa that Shigemoto wants to see him.
21	9	"Are You Expecting Us to Sugarcoat This?"; Transliteration: "Kireigoto ga Kikitakute Kita n desu ka?" (Japanese: きれい事が聞きたくて来たんですか?)	Fumio Maezono	Ringo Fujisawa	September 6, 2026 (Note: Due to the broadcast of 24 Hour Television: Love Saves The Earth, this episode was delayed one week from its originally scheduled air date of August 30, 2026.)
Once Yamimori arrives at the meeting, Shigemoto reveals that Sho Manao, a former colleague, perpetrated the shrine incident as a way to ease magic regulations. He explains that while he was developing a spell that would protect magical girls, Manao suggested that they use them as guinea pigs instead. At some point, Manao vanished once the calamity-class Kaii appeared and he did not resurface again until his picture was featured in newspapers. Back in the present, Koga has a conversation with Yasuo Kamakura about Magilumiere. The next day, Lily is at the office where she has separate conversations with Yamimori and Kana. Elsewhere, Manao has a meeting with Kamakura. Later that evening, while Magilumiere is hanging out at a bar, Midorikawa tells Shigemoto that he believes the next Kaii attack will happen in Tokyo Bay.
22	10	"Do You Like Barley Spice?"; Transliteration: "Purihato...... Suki Nan Desu ka?" (Japanese: プリハト......好きなんですか?)	Toshiteru Masamoto	Yōhei Suzuki	September 13, 2026
During a meeting at the office, Shigemoto reveals that Kamakura, a CMO member, is the mastermind behind the series of incidents. As such, Shigemoto has set up a special job to thwart Kamakura's scheme. Meanwhile, Koga admits to Hasegawa that he is using Kamakura to ensure another calamity does not happen again. At AST, Tsuchiba tests the company's new magical device. Afterward, she runs into Kana at a park, where they bond over the Barley Spice anime series. The following day, Magilumiere is monitoring Takeshiba Port when the Kaii is deployed by Manao. The Kaii eventually undergoes a mutation while Magilumiere attempts to contain it.
23	11	"A Job You Can Bail On Has No Value"; Transliteration: "Akirame no Aru Shigoto Nado mu Kachi Desu" (Japanese: 諦めのある仕事など無価値です)	Moka Kiyose	Kōichi Takada	September 20, 2026
Kamakura informs Koga that he wants AST to handle the Kaii at Takeshiba Port. He also informs him that Magilumiere is already at the scene. Tsuchiba eventually arrives at Takeshiba Port. Due to her using Wings, AST's magical device, Shigemoto has his employees shift to a joint extermination to ensure that AST does not monopolize the operation as part of the deregulation faction. After a while, the Kaii mysteriously regenerates. Kana soon confronts Tsuchiba when she discovers the latter is going to use Wings beyond its accepted output level. As a result, Koga tells Tsuchiba to abort the mission, which she does.
24	12	"Glad I Became a Magical Girl"; Transliteration: "Mahō Shōjo ni Natte Yokatta" (Japanese: 魔法少女になって良かった)	Hiroyasu Oda	Hiroyasu Oda	September 27, 2026
Kana and Tsuchiba agree to have a discussion over the weekend. Meanwhile, AST and Magilumiere form a temporary partnership after Shigemoto contacts Koga. While everyone prepares to use a combination spell, a flashback reveals this scenario was Shigemoto's contingency plan. Back in the present, Magilumiere deploy their magic circles. When it is AST's turn, however, Tsuchiba is unable to deploy hers due to emotional distress. Another flashback reveals Tsuchiba gained her cold personality after she realized the fictional Barley Spice could not help her end her parents' hardships. The Kaii is eventually exterminated by the combination spell thanks to Kana helping Tsuchiba overcome her issues. Afterward, the magical girls eat ramen together. Elsewhere, Kamakura tells Manao that he is going to turn the setback into a success. The following day, Kana heads to her lunch date with Tsuchiba.

== Reception ==
Masaki Endo from Tsutaya News felt the series was unique among works of the magical girl genre; Endo also praised the balance between fantasy and reality. Makoto Kitani from Da Vinci praised the comedic elements of the story and the artwork; Kitani also felt the story was unique among magical girl works. Steven Blackburn from Screen Rant praised the series, particularly enjoying the comedic moments. He also felt that the series worked well as a satire of Sailor Moon.

The series was nominated for the 2022 Next Manga Award in the web manga category, and ranked third out of 50 nominees.
