= Botan Kamiina Fully Blossoms When Drunk =

Japanese manga series

- First tankōbon volume cover, featuring Botan Kamiina

上伊那ぼたん、酔へる姿は百合の花 (Kamiina Botan, Yoeru Sugata wa Yuri no Hana)
- Genre: Comedy; Yuri
- Manga
- Written by: Hey
- Published by: Akita Shoten
- Imprint: Young Champion Comics
- Magazine: Champion Cross
- Original run: March 19, 2019 – present
- Volumes: 8
- Anime television series
- Directed by: Takashi Sakuma
- Written by: Yoko Yonaiyama
- Music by: Kana Hashiguchi
- Studio: Soigne
- Licensed by: Crunchyroll: SEA: Muse Communication
- Original network: Tokyo MX, BS11, GYT, GTV, TVS
- Original run: April 11, 2026 – June 27, 2026
- Episodes: 12
- icon

Botan Kamiina Fully Blossoms When Drunk (上伊那ぼたん、酔へる姿は百合の花, Kamiina Botan, Yoeru Sugata wa Yuri no Hana; lit. 'Kamiina Botan, Her Drunken Appearance Like a Lily Flower') is a Japanese manga series written and illustrated by Hey. It is serialized on Akita Shoten's Champion Cross web service since March 2019. An anime television series adaptation produced by Soigne aired from April to June 2026.

== Plot ==
The series follows Botan Kamiina, a university student who lives in Chichibu, Saitama. She drinks for the first time after encountering Ibuki Tonami, her dorm's leader. Ibuki, who has trouble drinking in public, quickly develops a friendship with Botan, becoming drinking partners with her. As a newcomer to drinking, Botan spends her time trying different kinds of alcohol.

== Characters ==
Botan Kamiina (上伊那 ぼたん, Kamiina Botan)
Voiced by: Sayumi Suzushiro
The title character, she is a 20-year-old university student who originally came from Nagano Prefecture. She does not like drinking carbonated drinks as they make her burp. She drinks for the first time after her encounter with Ibuki, being curious about what she was drinking. She has a fondness for seafood due to coming from a landlocked prefecture. She is afraid of thunder due to an incident when she was 10 years old. As of Chapter 27, she is in a romantic relationship with Ibuki.
Ibuki Tonami (砺波 いぶき, Tonami Ibuki)
Voiced by: Yoshino Aoyama
A third-year university student originally from Toyama Prefecture and the dorm supervisor of Botan's dormitory. She likes to drink alcohol, but avoids drinking in public as she is conscious of the hiccups she gets from drinking. She develops a close friendship with Botan after they become drinking partners, leading to them often hanging out together. As of Chapter 27, she is in a romantic relationship with Botan.
Kanade Gujō (郡上 かなで, Gujō Kanade)
Voiced by: Minako Kotobuki
A graduate student originally from Gifu Prefecture who is currently in her first year of her master's degree. She has feelings for Ibuki and is disappointed in how Ibuki became close to Botan.
Yaeka Kitamori (北杜 やえか, Kitamori Yaeka)
Voiced by: Miyu Tomita
A second-year university student originally from Yamanashi Prefecture. She is fond of the outdoors and is very close to Akane. She later gets a motorcycle license.
Akane Yusa (遊佐 あかね, Yusa Akane)
Voiced by: Yurina Amami
A second-year university student who is close to Yaeka. She inherited a strong interest in music from her parents, and plays guitar in a band called YOus!R. She later considers dropping out of college.
Chin-Lan Chang (張 景嵐, Chang Chin-Lan)
Voiced by: Maki Kawase
A student originally from Yilan, Taiwan. She develops feelings for Kanade and is aware of her crush on Ibuki.

== Media ==
=== Manga ===
Written and illustrated by Hey, Botan Kamiina Fully Blossoms When Drunk began serialization on Akita Shoten's Champion Cross manga service on March 19, 2019, with the first tankōbon volume published on January 20, 2020; eight volumes have been released as of May 20, 2026.

==== Volumes ====
No.	Release date	ISBN
1	January 20, 2020	978-4-253-14236-6
2	December 18, 2020	978-4-253-14237-3
3	March 17, 2022	978-4-253-14238-0
4	June 20, 2023	978-4-253-14239-7
5	August 20, 2024	978-4-253-14240-3
6	March 18, 2025	978-4-253-31416-9
7	October 20, 2025	978-4-253-00470-1
8	May 20, 2026	978-4-253-01364-2
9	January 20, 2027	978-4-253-02216-3

=== Anime ===
An anime television series adaptation was announced on March 12, 2025. It is produced by Aniplex, animated by Soigne and directed by Takashi Sakuma, with Shuntarō Tozawa serving as assistant director, Yoko Yonaiyama writing series scripts, Kou Yoshinari designing the characters, and Kana Hashiguchi composing the music. The series aired from April 11 to June 27, 2026, on Tokyo MX and other networks. (Note: Tokyo MX listed the series premiere on April 10 at 24:00, which is effectively April 11 at midnight JST.) The opening theme song is "Mebuku Toki" (芽吹くとき; 'Time to Sprout'), performed by yonige, while the ending theme song is "Kanjō Glass" (感情グラス; 'Emotional Glass'), performed by the main cast members. Crunchyroll is streaming the series. Muse Communication licensed the series in Southeast Asia.

==== Episodes ====
No.	Title	Directed by	Written by	Storyboarded by	Animation directed by	Original release date
1	"Episode 1"	Takashi Sakuma	Yōko Yonaiyama	Takashi Sakuma	Miyachi	April 11, 2026
While visiting a festival with her housemates, Botan Kamiina runs off to find Ibuki Tonami, who separated from the group. Botan sees Ibuki drinking a highball by herself, as Ibuki explains she drinks in secret to hide her hiccups. Botan expresses interest in trying the highball despite having no experience with alcohol, and Ibuki muses they are sharing an indirect kiss. Botan playfully teases Ibuki on her cuteness while drinking the highball, flustering the latter. Botan later invites Ibuki to a drinking session at her dorm room, with Ibuki bringing Kyoho wine for the occasion. Botan continues teasing Ibuki on her experience with alcohol, and Ibuki shares her surprise with Botan's playful and unrestrained attitude when drinking. Kanade Gujō encounters them bonding late at night, leading her to invite Botan to drink sake. Kanade implicitly reveals her feelings for Ibuki after asking Botan if Ibuki would invite her to a drinking session, so Botan teases her. Meanwhile, Ibuki reflects on Botan stating she is interested in her.
2	"Episode 2"	Yūsuke Yamamoto	Yōko Yonaiyama	Yūsuke Yamamoto	Yūsuke Matsuo (Note: De facto via animation director credits)	April 18, 2026
Kanade fails to have Ibuki drink with her, so she invites Botan to a liquor store. They drink samples of shōchū and purchase it, while Kanade continues to see Botan's closeness to Ibuki. Kanade and Botan are however dismayed to see Ibuki not drinking at the dorm's hotpot. Botan and Ibuki are then dragged by housemate Yaeka Kitamori to a trip to Nagatoro after arguing with Akane Yusa. Yaeka struggles to apologize to Akane as they drink beer by the riverside. Yaeka shares how she and Akane bonded through their love of traveling and wonders why they argued. Botan points out the misunderstanding, prompting Yaeka to properly apologize and promise to Akane on taking her to Nagatoro. Botan and Ibuki later travel to a boutique selling clothes and alcohol in Tokyo, where Botan hears the boutique owner talk to Ibuki on bringing a companion. Botan joins them in drinking semi-sparkling wine and flirts with Ibuki on having their ears pierced and wearing matching earrings, leaving the latter bashful.
3	"Episode 3"	Katsuya Shigehara	Hideaki Shirasaka	Gin-san	Gin-san	April 25, 2026
During a thunderstorm, Botan asks Ibuki to join her in her sleep. Ibuki accepts and brings absinthe to use as a nightcap, where Botan becomes shocked at its high alcohol volume. Botan shares her confusion and joy in drinking absinthe, a sentiment with which Ibuki sympathizes. Ibuki shares her enjoyment in spending time with Botan before sleeping. The next day, the two girls assist Akane in carrying her belongings to the dorm. Akane shows off her vinyl records, which she received from her father, and plays them using a record player gifted by Yaeka. Deeply moved by the sound coming from the record player, Akane leaves to call Yaeka and thank her for "the best gift." Left alone, Botan and Ibuki share Akane's India pale ale while listening to music, during which Botan invites Ibuki to a private onsen. Later on, they travel to a bathhouse and are greeted with a view of the ocean, which Botan had specially booked. Botan and Ibuki drink sake and relax, agreeing to call each other on a first-name basis. Ibuki confesses she can no longer imagine herself drinking without Botan, surprising and flustering the latter. Meanwhile, Kanade voices her jealousy towards Botan and Ibuki's growing intimacy to a confused Akane and Yaeka at a bar.
4	"Episode 4"	Hidenori Makino	Tomoko Shinozuka	Shuntarō Tozawa	Norie Igawa	May 2, 2026
The housemates travel to Mitsumine Shrine and voice awe at Akane being able to drive with a manual transmission. Kanade attempts to drive to impress Ibuki but fails. After arriving at the shrine, Ibuki and Botan sneak out to buy sake at the shrine's liquor store. The two then find a matchmaking shrine, and they fill out their names. Kanade continues to think on Botan and Ibuki's intimacy, as she invites Botan to play games with her on her console while drinking chūhai. Botan and Kanade enjoy themselves in the games, and Kanade reveals she wishes to see Ibuki drink publicly again before dozing off with Botan. Sometime later, Botan, Ibuki, and Yaeka go sightseeing at Kawagoe, and Yaeka jealously tells them to forget about Akane not joining them. Yaeka brings them to a foot spa cafe, where Botan notices her toenail polish matches Akane's. Yaeka impulsively demands them not to match their polish before offering a different shade and leaving, much to Botan and Ibuki's confusion. Ibuki surmises the polish holds sentimental value for Yaeka and Akane, so Botan asks her to apply the polish offered by Yaeka for their own nails.
5	"Episode 5"	Shuntarō Tozawa	Tomoko Shinozuka	Shuntarō Tozawa	Takuya Miyahara & Akerora	May 9, 2026
Botan and Ibuki visit a discreet bar and order a salty dog. Ibuki assumes they are the only customers and confidently drinks at the counter, only for other patrons to arrive. A shameful Ibuki moves her and Botan to a table to hide her hiccups. Ibuki tearfully reveals how she was told of her hiccups being obnoxious, bringing trauma and causing her to drink in secret out of fear of being mocked again. Botan retorts she does not find her obnoxious, easing Ibuki's worries. Later at the dorm, Kanade, Botan, and Akane distill a mixture of strawberry and Scotch whisky based on umeshu. Kanade admits to Botan that she made the whisky mixture with Ibuki in mind. Botan urges Kanade to invite Ibuki on an outing. Kanade and Ibuki take a detour to a flower field in Yamanashi, and Kanade offers they drink the whisky together. Ibuki reluctantly declines, leaving Kanade hurt on seeing Ibuki hesitate around her. Kanade smokes a cigarette to cope, as Ibuki grabs it to smoke as well and apologizes for not accommodating her.
6	"Episode 6"	Katsuya Shigehara	Yōko Yonaiyama	Katsuya Shigehara	Jura & Kiyakiya	May 16, 2026
Taiwanese exchange student Chin-Lan Chang moves into the dorm for the upcoming semester. She joins Botan and Ibuki in exploring a limestone cave, but Chin-Lan becomes frightened by its cold and cramped atmosphere. Botan guides her to the cave's exit by holding her hand, and a grateful Chin-Lan invites her to go drinking at a bar. Ibuki grows jealous of Chin-Lan's brazenness and joins them, despite recalling her previous trauma. Ibuki sets aside her trauma and drinks Chin-Lan's beer after hearing her plans to have private drinking sessions with Botan. Ibuki later rents a hostel for the group, as Botan assists a drunk Chin-Lan to their room. Chin-Lan voices her gratitude to Botan and deduces that she likes Ibuki before sleeping. Botan and Ibuki then drink more alcohol at the hostel's common room, where Ibuki regards Botan as a special person in her life even after exposing her drinking hiccups to Chin-Lan, and they hold hands. Elsewhere, Yaeka and Akane leave a party and discuss their individual concerns. Akane proclaims her wish to become one with Yaeka upon seeing how much they complement each other, flustering Yaeka.
7	"Episode 7"	Kōsuke Kuremizu	Tomoko Shinozuka	Yūsuke Yamamoto	Hiroaki Satō	May 23, 2026
Ibuki, Kanade, and Chin-Lan go hiking around Mount Bukō as Botan and Akane stay behind to assist a feverish Yaeka. The group travels to the summit, where a skeptical Ibuki gradually understands the appeal of mountaineering. Ibuki learns of a sake distilled from Mount Bukō's water, motivating her to complete the hike. Ibuki later invites Botan to a planetarium at Tokyo Skytree, during which they drink beer and discuss their love of outer space. Botan declares on wanting to understand Ibuki better, leading Ibuki to request Botan on referring to each other on an intimate level. Back at the dorm, Kanade spends time with Chin-Lan while waiting for their housemates to return. Chin-Lan declines on having Kanade apply moisturizer on her and tastes her bottle of aged sake. Kanade admits the bottle was a gift from Ibuki and wistfully expresses her desire to learn about Ibuki's disposition. Hearing this, Chin-Lan states she wants to know Kanade more and asks she apply lip mask to her face, catching Kanade off-guard.
8	"Episode 8"	Shunsuke Okubo	Tomoko Shinozuka	Shunsuke Okubo	Shunsuke Okubo	May 30, 2026
After practicing with her band for a gig, Akane wonders on her band's commitment to music and her future. She later meets with Yaeka, Botan, and Chin-Lan, where they notice Akane's moodiness. Yaeka tries to ask the brooding Akane on her worries while traveling around Tokyo, though Akane is evasive. Chin-Lan and Botan separate from the group and visit a bar. Chin-Lan asks Botan if she and Ibuki are dating. Botan denies the claim but admits her feelings for Ibuki, causing Chin-Lan to bluntly point out how Botan may be leading Ibuki on. A few days later, Botan and Ibuki travel to Okutama and buy craft beer before heading to the river to relax. The two girls enjoy their time drinking and Ibuki thanks Botan for accompanying her in their outing. Botan begins to think on Chin-Lan's words and walks further down the river much to Ibuki's surprise.
9	"Episode 9"	Hironori Tanaka	Hideaki Shirasaka	Hironori Tanaka	Hironori Tanaka	June 6, 2026
Kanade and Chin-Lan hold a small party at Ibuki's room and drink gin and tonic. Although Ibuki is hesitant after being reminded of her trauma, she drinks the gin much to Kanade's astonishment. Ibuki admits to Kanade and Chin-Lan on how spending time with Botan made her enjoy drinking alcohol again. Upon seeing Kanade's dour reaction, Chin-Lan offers her mead. Chin-Lan later takes Kanade on a trip to Mount Takao at the start of autumn as part of Chin-Lan's plan to cheer up Kanade. Elsewhere, Botan and Ibuki head to a cottage to relax and go stargazing. A distant Botan reflects on Ibuki regarding her as a special person. Botan voices her intent to privately talk to Ibuki, but she delays it out of fear of assuming she does not reciprocate her feelings. The two girls later take a bath together, where Ibuki declares her desire to be more than friends with Botan. Botan and Ibuki tearfully confirm their love for each other and share their first kiss underneath a starry night sky.
10	"Episode 10"	Yoshiko Okuda	Tomoko Shinozuka	Yoshiko Okuda	Jura & Takuma Yamasaki	June 13, 2026
While visiting an art gallery, Kanade talks to Chin-Lan on her conflicting feelings towards Botan and Ibuki dating and hesitation to directly confront her own feelings. Chin-Lan takes her to a bar to collect herself and discuss their shared interest in the arts, during which Kanade asks Chin-Lan if she likes someone. Chin-Lan plainly admits to Kanade that she likes her, and voices her intention to be by her side if Kanade feels lost. Later, Botan, Akane, and Yaeka hang out at a live house. Yaeka shares to Botan her annoyance towards Akane focusing on herself, though she confesses on feeling at ease with Akane's singing. Botan secretly messages Akane to perform a cover of Yaeka's favorite song, which successfully catches Yaeka's attention. Yaeka joins Akane in singing together, leaving Botan satisfied. The housemates then hold a party at the dorm while talking to Ibuki, who is currently away, through a video call. Ibuki grows jealous at seeing her housemates drink shōchū without her.
11	"Episode 11"	Hisashi Sugawara	Hideaki Shirasaka	Magnific Singer Mel	Takuya Miyahara	June 20, 2026
Chin-Lan and Kanade dine at a restaurant and talk about the films Kanade has watched, including those from Taiwanese cinema. Chin-Lan casually expresses her love for Kanade's enthusiasm and interprets it as Kanade becoming interested in her. Meanwhile, Botan and Ibuki go shopping for winter clothes and cosmetics, where a bashful Ibuki picks out her perfume with Botan's help. Botan sees how Ibuki only shows enthusiasm around alcohol and worries that she may not feel the same while spending time with her. Sometime later, Akane, who continues to ruminate on her future, asks Botan to join her at a cafe to drink beer and smoke hookah. Akane and Botan sense each other's concerns and decide to open up. Akane reveals her decision to drop out of college to pursue her passion for music, adding that Yaeka has no knowledge of it. Botan supports Akane's decision and discloses her worries on her relationship with Ibuki. After returning to the dorm, Botan is reminded of Akane stating she wants her passion to consume her.
12	"Episode 12"	Kōsuke Kuremizu	Yōko Yonaiyama	Masaomi Andō	Hidenori Makino, Jura, Hiroaki Satō, Kiyakiya, Akihiro Sueta, Takuma Yamasaki & Miyachi	June 27, 2026
Botan tries to buy the earrings she and Ibuki aimed to get, but learns from the boutique owner that someone else purchased it. She then joins the housemates at a ropeway to Mount Hodo where Ibuki notices Botan's contemplative behavior. As Christmas approaches, Chin-Lan accompanies Kanade to a bookstore and proposes they do a gift swap after seeing her love for books. Kanade expresses her desire to learn more about Chin-Lan, which the latter eagerly accepts. Later on, Botan and Ibuki visit a specialty shop selling sake and stay at a hotel in the snowy town of Yuzawa. Botan is reminded of Ibuki's enthusiasm for alcohol and wonders how much time she has left to spend with her. Botan later bluntly questions Ibuki on what their relationship is, leading Ibuki to reveal she purchased the matching earrings. Ibuki asks Botan to pierce their ears together, assuring her that she loves her. Ibuki adds that she will continue to stay close to her, prompting a hopeful Botan to ask if they can share a drink.
