= Sorairo Utility =

Japanese anime television short film

- Key visual for the short film

空色ユーティリティ (Sorairo Yūtiriti)
- Genre: Sports (golf)
- Anime television film
- Directed by: Kengo Saitō
- Produced by: Li Hengda
- Written by: Kōta Nozomi
- Music by: Daisuke Horita
- Studio: Yostar Pictures
- Licensed by: Crunchyroll
- Original network: Tokyo MX
- Released: December 31, 2021
- Runtime: 14 minutes
- Anime television series
- Directed by: Kengo Saitō
- Written by: Yū Satō; Aya Satsuki; Aki Mizuki
- Music by: Daisuke Horita
- Studio: Yostar Pictures (Note: Series production assistance (シリーズ制作協力) for all episodes provided by Studio Lings.)
- Licensed by: Sentai Filmworks: SA/SEA: Medialink
- Original network: Tokyo MX, tvk, MBS, BS Asahi, AT-X
- Original run: January 4, 2025 – March 22, 2025
- Episodes: 12

Sorairo Utility (空色ユーティリティ, Sorairo Yūtiriti; lit. 'Sky-colored Utility') is a Japanese original anime television short film about golf produced by Yostar Pictures and directed by Kengo Saitō. It premiered on Tokyo MX in December 2021. An anime television series, also produced by Yostar Pictures, aired from January to March 2025.

== Plot ==
After her favorite mobile game announces it is shutting down, high school student Minami Aoba finds herself in a difficult situation, having no other hobbies. Trying out various activities and not finding fulfillment in them, Minami feels that she is not special. One day, she finds herself at a nearby driving range, where she meets Haruka Akane. Seeing potential in Minami, Haruka gives her a utility iron club and pushes her to give golf a try. Despite her initial hesitation about the sport, Minami embraces golf, forming a friendship with Haruka, and later on, the popular golf influencer Ayaka Hoshimi.

== Characters ==
Minami Aoba (青羽 美波, Aoba Minami)
Voiced by: Miyu Takagi
A student who goes to an all-girls high school. She looks for a hobby after the mobile game she was playing announced it was ending service. After trying various hobbies, she ultimately gains an interest in golf after a chance encounter with Haruka.
Haruka Akane (茜 遥, Akane Haruka)
Voiced by: Yurina Amami
A high school student who works part-time at a driving range. She is the one who introduced Minami to golf. She was previously a skilled amateur golfer who participated in international competitions.
Ayaka Hoshimi (星見 彩花, Hoshimi Ayaka)
Voiced by: Ayasa Goto
A university student and a popular influencer. She becomes fond of Minami and helped her work part-time jobs to afford golfing equipment. She also works as a model.
Izumi Akina (秋名 泉美, Akina Izumi)
Voiced by: Yumiri Hanamori
Minami's classmate and friend who is a skilled shogi player.
Masao Tadokoro (田所 昌夫, Tadokoro Masao) / Masa (マサ)
Voiced by: Kazuhiko Inoue
Chosuke Tanabe (田辺 長介, Tanabe Chōsuke) / Cho (チョウ)
Voiced by: Kenyu Horiuchi
Tetsuhiro Tanaka (田中 哲弘, Tanaka Tetsuhiro) / Tetsu (テツ)
Voiced by: Toshiyuki Morikawa
Hina Yoarashi (夜嵐 日向, Yoarashi Hina)
Voiced by: Maria Naganawa
A wealthy girl who admires Haruka.

== Production and release ==
On October 25, 2021, the original anime produced by Yostar Pictures was announced. It was later revealed to be a television short film, with Kengo Saitō directing the film, Li Hengda producing the film, Kōta Nozomi writing the screenplay, Akira Amemiya in charge of the storyboard, and Daisuke Horita composing the music, and directing the sound. The 14-minute short film premiered on Tokyo MX on December 31, 2021. The film's theme song is "Gunjō Love theory" (群青 Love theory) performed by the HAM unit (Miyu Takagi, Yurina Amami, and Ayasa Goto). Crunchyroll and Funimation both streamed the film outside of Asia.

An anime television series, also produced by Yostar Pictures, was announced on February 8, 2024. The cast and director reprised their roles from the film, with Yū Satō handling series composition, as well as writing scripts alongside Aya Satsuki and Aki Mizuki, Kōta Nozomi returning from the film for original concept cooperation, and Daisuke Horita returning to compose the music. The series aired from January 4 to March 22, 2025, on Tokyo MX and other networks. (Note: Tokyo MX lists the series premiere on January 3, 2025, at 25:00, which is effectively January 4 at 1:00 a.m. JST.) The opening theme song is "Shujinkō ni Narō!" (主人公になろう！; Be The Hero!), performed by Masayoshi Ōishi feat. Airi Suzuki, while the ending theme song is "Suiheisen" (水平線; Horizon), performed by Moeka Yahagi. Sentai Filmworks licensed the series for streaming on Hidive. Medialink licensed the series in South and Southeast Asia for streaming on Ani-One Asia's YouTube channel.

=== Episodes ===
No.	Title	Directed by	Written by	Storyboarded by	Original release date
1	"Special Encounters"; Transliteration: "Supesharuna Deai" (Japanese: スペシャルな出会い)	Shigetaka Ikeda	Yū Satō	Shigetaka Ikeda & Kengo Saitō	January 4, 2025
After her mobile game announced its end of service, Minami Aoba tries to find another hobby. On her way home, she helps an old man in bringing his golf club to a nearby driving range, where she meets Akane Haruka, who invites her to play golf. Minami soon takes an interest in the sport. Akane invites her to play at a short course.
2	"Special Friend"; Transliteration: "Supesharuna Tomodachi" (Japanese: スペシャルな友達)	Katō Shūsaku	Yū Satō	Shigetaka Ikeda & Kengo Saitō	January 11, 2025
Minami struggles her first time playing golf, but Akane guides her throughout the day. They exchanged contact information that night. During class the day after, Minami tells her friend Izumi about golf. Later, Akane gives Minami with her used golf clubs as a reward for a "perfect 100-point game". She messages Ayaka Hoshimi, a streamer, notifying her about Minami's promising talent.
3	"Special Job"; Transliteration: "Supesharuna Oshigoto" (Japanese: スペシャルなお仕事)	Zenichirō Itō	Aya Satsuki	Shigetaka Ikeda & Kengo Saitō	January 18, 2025
4	"Special Club"; Transliteration: "Supesharuna Kurabu" (Japanese: スペシャルなクラブ)	Hiroyuki Okuno	Aki Mizuki	Shigetaka Ikeda & Kengo Saitō	January 25, 2025
5	"Special Training"; Transliteration: "Supesharuna Tokkun" (Japanese: スペシャルな特訓)	Shūsaku Katō	Yū Satō	Shigetaka Ikeda & Kengo Saito	February 1, 2025
6	"Special Round"; Transliteration: "Supesharuna Raundo" (Japanese: スペシャルなラウンド)	Katsunari Mikajiri	Aki Mizuki	Shinichi Tabe	February 8, 2025
7	"Special Finishing Move!"; Transliteration: "Supesharuna Hissatsu Waza" (Japanese: スペシャルな必殺技)	Shigeru Fukase	Yū Satō	Shinichi Tabe	February 15, 2025
8	"Special Caddie"; Transliteration: "Supesharuna Kyadi" (Japanese: スペシャルなキャディ)	Hiroyuki Okuno	Aya Satsuki	Shinichi Watanabe	February 22, 2025
9	"Special Buzz"; Transliteration: "Supesharuna Bazu" (Japanese: スペシャルなバズ)	Zenichirō Itō & Shūsaku Katō	Risa Mizuno	Masaoki Nakajima	March 1, 2025
10	"Special Milady!?"; Transliteration: "Supesharuna Ojōsama!?" (Japanese: スペシャルなお嬢様！？)	Shūsaku Katō	Yū Satō	Yūsuke Suzuki	March 8, 2025
11	"Special Doubles Match"; Transliteration: "Supesharuna Daburusu" (Japanese: スペシャルなダブルス)	Shinichi Tabe	Aya Satsuki	Takafumi Hoshikawa	March 15, 2025
12	"Special 'Special'"; Transliteration: "Supesharuna Tokubetsu" (Japanese: スペシャルな特別)	Katsunari Mikajiri	Aki Mizuki	Akira Amemiya	March 22, 2025

== Reception ==
The series was positively received. ANN reviewers Richard Eisenbeis, James Beckett, and Caitlin Moore said the series was in "the real world" but is still "pretty darned charming...and...incredibly gay" and is a "straightforward anime about girls playing golf." All three compared it to Birdie Wing, which they called a "sapphic-charged golf anime" which was ""absolutely batshit insane" and which turned golf "into an extreme sport with high-stakes mob gambling", was "incredibly gay" and mixed mafia and stunt shots which were "approximately equivalent to KISS-theming and black lights." All three contrasted it to Sorairo Utility. Yuricon founder Erica Friedman also compared the series to Birdie Wing. She said that while the series was not "more gay and outlandish women's sports drama," it is centered more on golf, differs from the Sorairo Utility movie, and is "very refreshing" with the relationship between Haruka and Minami and the chill nature of the old male players, but criticized the fan service in the series, while calling the series a "shockingly nice anime...about golf." She also rated the art at a 7/10, characters at 9/10, story at 8/10, fan service at 5/10, and yuri at 1/10.
