= Ayasa Goto =

Japanese voice actress

- 後藤 彩佐
- Born: November 23, 1998 (age 27); Aichi Prefecture, Japan
- Occupation: Voice actress
- Years active: 2020–present
- Agent: 81 Produce
- Notable work: Sorairo Utility as Ayaka Hoshimi

Ayasa Goto (後藤 彩佐, Gotō Ayasa; born November 23, 1998) is a Japanese voice actress from Aichi Prefecture who is affiliated with 81 Produce. She started her voice acting career after being selected as one of the winners of a 2017 audition by the talent agency 81 Produce; she formally joined the agency in 2020. She voiced her first main role as Ayaka Hoshimi in the anime special Sorairo Utility in 2021; she and her co-stars also performed the special's theme song "Gunjō Love Theory". She also reprised the role of Ayaka in its 2025 anime television series.

== Filmography ==
=== Anime ===
2021

- PuraOre! Pride of Orange, Sachie Kaibara

2025

- Sorairo Utility, Ayaka Hoshimi

=== ONA ===
- Sorairo Utility (2021), Ayaka
