= Yostar Pictures =

Japanese animation studio

Yostar Pictures Inc.
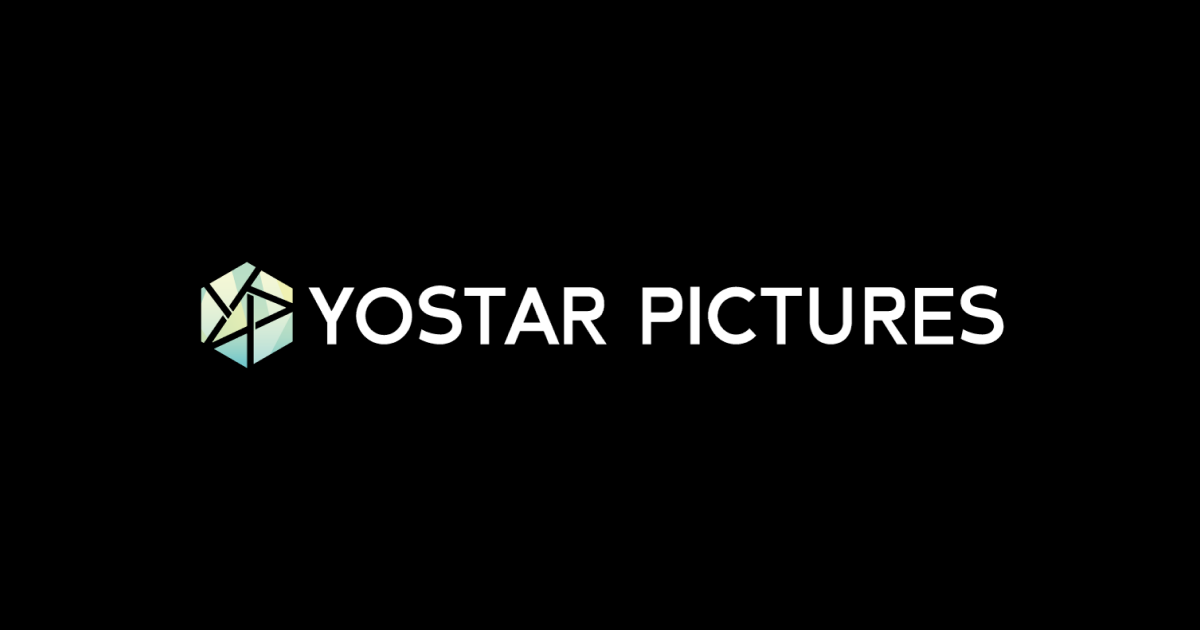
- Native name: 株式会社Yostar Pictures
- Romanized name: Kabushiki-gaisha Yostar Pictures
- Type: Kabushiki-gaisha
- Industry: Japanese animation
- Founded: January 31, 2020; 6 years ago
- Headquarters: Kanda-Neribeichō, Chiyoda, Tokyo, Japan
- Key people: Li Hengda
- Total equity: ¥ 5,000,000
- Parent: Yostar
- Website: yostar-pictures.co.jp

Yostar Pictures Inc. (Japanese: 株式会社Yostar Pictures, Hepburn: Kabushiki-gaisha Yostar Pictures) is a Japanese animation studio in Chiyoda, Tokyo founded in 2020 as a subsidiary company of Chinese video game developer Yostar.

== Works ==
=== Television series ===
Title	Director(s)	First run start date	First run end date	Eps	Note(s)	Ref(s)
Azur Lane: Slow Ahead! (season 1)	Masato Jinbo	January 21, 2021	March 30, 2021	12	Based on the video game Azur Lane. Co-produced with Candy Box.	
Arknights: Prelude to Dawn	Yuki Watanabe	October 29, 2022	December 27, 2022	8	Based on the video game Arknights. The first season of the series.	
Arknights: Perish in Frost	Yuki Watanabe	October 7, 2023	November 25, 2023	8	Sequel to Arknights: Prelude to Dawn. The second season of the series.	
Blue Archive The Animation	Daigo Yamagishi	April 7, 2024	June 23, 2024	12	Based on the video game Blue Archive. Co-produced with Candy Box.	
Go! Go! Loser Ranger! (season 1)	Keiichi Sato	April 7, 2024	June 30, 2024	12	Based a manga by Negi Haruba.	
Sorairo Utility	Kengo Saitō	January 4, 2025	March 22, 2025	12	Original work. Related to the short anime film.	
Go! Go! Loser Ranger! (season 2)	Keiichi Sato	April 13, 2025	June 29, 2025	12	Sequel to Go! Go! Loser Ranger!.	
Arknights: Rise from Ember	Yuki Watanabe	July 4, 2025	September 5, 2025	10	Sequel to Arknights: Perish in Frost. The third season of the series.	
Needy Girl Overdose	Masaoki Nakashima	April 5, 2026	June 28, 2026	13	Based on the video game Needy Streamer Overload.	

=== Feature films ===
Title	Director(s)	Release date	Runtime	Note(s)	Ref(s)
Sorairo Utility	Kengo Saitō	December 31, 2021	14 minutes	Original work.	

=== Original video animation ===
Title	Director(s)	Release date	Eps	Note(s)	Ref(s)
Azur Lane Queen's Orders	—N/a	July 27, 2023	2	Based on the video game Azur Lane.	

== See also ==
- Cypic, a similar animation studio that is originally an animation subsidiary of video game company Cygames before its consolidation by its parent company CyberAgent
