= Miyu Takagi =

Japanese voice actress

- 高木 美佑
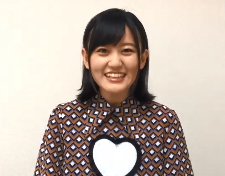
- Takagi in 2019.
- Born: September 8, 1996 (age 30); Sendai, Miyagi Prefecture, Japan
- Occupation: Voice actress
- Years active: 2014–present
- Agent: 81 Produce
- Notable work: Wake Up, Girls! as Miyu Okamoto; Hacka Doll as Hacka Doll #1; D4DJ as Shinobu Inoyose

Miyu Takagi (高木 美佑, Takagi Miyu; born September 8, 1996) is a Japanese voice actress from Chiba Prefecture who is affiliated with 81 Produce. She started her career as a member of the idol and voice acting group Wake Up, Girls!, which was active from 2014 to 2018. She is also known for roles such as Hacka Doll #1 in Hacka Doll and Shinobu Inoyose in D4DJ.

== Biography ==
Takagi was born in Sendai, Miyagi Prefecture on September 8, 1996. She later moved to Chiba Prefecture.

Takagi's career began after passing an audition to become part of the idol mixed-media project Wake Up, Girls!. Apart from becoming a member of the real-life group, she was cast as the character Miyu Okamoto. Takagi would play the character in the project's anime series, which aired in 2014. She ultimately remained with the project until the group's dissolution in 2017.

In 2014, Takagi was cast as Hacka Doll #1 in the mixed-media project Hacka Doll. In 2015, she was appointed as a tourism ambassador for Iida, Nagano.

After Wake Up, Girls! disbanded, Takagi continued her voice acting activities. In 2020, she was cast as Shinobu Inoyose in the mixed-media project D4DJ.

== Filmography ==
=== Anime ===
2014

- Wake Up, Girls!, Miyu Okamoto

2015

- Hacka Doll: The Animation, Hacka Doll #1

2017

- Anime-Gatari, Matsuri Toda

2019

- Cinderella Nine, Koko Aisaka

2020

- D4DJ First Mix, Shinobu Inoyose

2021

- D4DJ Petit Mix, Shinobu Inoyose
- Sorairo Utility, Minami Aoba

2022

- Healer Girl, Shinobu Honosaka

2023

- In Another World with My Smartphone 2nd Season, Lucia Rea Regulus

2025

- Sorairo Utility, Minami Aoba

=== Games ===
2015

- Sword Art Online: Lost Song, Nijika Karatachi (Rain)

2022

- Girls' Frontline, SuperNova

=== Software ===
- Synthesizer V (2022), Natsuki Karin
