= Azur Lane Queen's Orders =

Japanese manga series

- Cover art of the first volume

アズールレーン Queen's Orders (Azūru Rēn Queen's Orders)
- Genre: Action, military
- Created by: Shanghai Manjuu; Xiamen Yongshi
- Manga
- Written by: Tsuchii
- Published by: Ichijinsha
- Magazine: Monthly Comic Rex
- Original run: October 26, 2018 – present
- Volumes: 7
- Original video animation
- Written by: Yū Yamashita
- Music by: Daisuke Horita
- Studio: Yostar Pictures
- Released: July 27, 2023
- Episodes: 2

Azur Lane Queen's Orders (アズールレーン Queen's Orders, Azūru Rēn Queen's Orders) is a Japanese manga series written and illustrated by Tsuchii. It is based on the Chinese side-scrolling shoot 'em up video game Azur Lane by Shanghai Manjuu and Xiamen Yongshi. The series has been serialized in Ichijinsha's Monthly Comic Rex magazine since October 2018 and has been collected into seven tankōbon volumes to date. An original video animation (OVA) adaptation produced by Yostar Pictures was released in July 2023.

== Characters ==
Valiant
Voiced by: Asuka Nishi
Queen Elizabeth
Voiced by: Sumire Uesaka
Warspite
Voiced by: Sumire Uesaka
Suffolk
Voiced by: Akari Uehara
Kisaragi
Voiced by: Rumi Okubo
Mutsuki
Voiced by: Rumi Okubo
Belfast
Voiced by: Yui Horie

== Media ==
=== Manga ===
The manga is written by Tsuchii, centering around characters based on British Queen Elizabeth-class battleships, HMS Queen Elizabeth, HMS Warspite and later also HMS Valiant. It began serialization in Ichijinsha's Monthly Comic Rex magazine on October 26, 2018.

No.	Release date	ISBN
1	June 27, 2019	9784758068109
2	February 27, 2020	9784758068505
3	November 26, 2020	9784758068932
4	August 26, 2021	9784758069403
5	April 27, 2022	9784758069731
6	October 27, 2022	9784758083850
7	July 27, 2023	9784758084260

=== Anime ===
An anime adaptation of the Azur Lane: Queen's Orders manga was announced in September 2021, as part of the game's fourth anniversary (and third anniversary in English). It was later revealed to be an original video animation (OVA) in September 2022. The OVA, consisting of two episodes, was released on July 27, 2023, on Blu-ray; the animation was initially due for a May 10 release but was delayed due to technical difficulties. The OVA is animated by Yostar Pictures and written by Yū Yamashita, with Masahide Yanagisawa, Yuzo Hirata and Niimura Kana designing the characters, and Daisuke Horita composing the music. The OVA's theme song is "Bloomin'" by Queen Elizabeth (Sumire Uesaka).
