= Arknights (TV series) =

2022 Japanese anime television series

アークナイツ (Ākunaitsu)
- Created by: Hypergryph
- Anime television series

Arknights: Prelude to Dawn
- Directed by: Yuki Watanabe
- Music by: Yuki Hayashi
- Studio: Yostar Pictures
- Licensed by: Crunchyroll
- Original network: TV Tokyo
- Original run: October 29, 2022 – December 17, 2022
- Episodes: 8
- Original net animation

Lee's Detective Agency: A Day in Lungmen
- Studio: Gravity Well
- Licensed by: Crunchyroll
- Released: December 23, 2022 – April 22, 2023
- Runtime: 9 minutes
- Episodes: 8
- Audio drama

Children of Ursus
- Written by: Soichiro Morizumi
- Studio: Aegir
- Original run: June 14, 2023 – present
- Episodes: 11
- Anime television series

Arknights: Perish in Frost
- Directed by: Yuki Watanabe
- Music by: Yuki Hayashi
- Studio: Yostar Pictures
- Licensed by: Crunchyroll
- Original network: TV Tokyo, TV Osaka, BS11, Animax
- Original run: October 7, 2023 – November 25, 2023
- Episodes: 8
- Anime television series

Arknights: Rise from Ember
- Directed by: Yuki Watanabe
- Music by: Yuki Hayashi
- Studio: Yostar Pictures
- Licensed by: Crunchyroll
- Original network: Tokyo MX, KBS Kyoto, Sun TV, BS11
- Original run: July 4, 2025 – September 5, 2025
- Episodes: 10

Arknights (Japanese: アークナイツ, Hepburn: Ākunaitsu) is a Japanese anime television series. Based on the video game of the same name, the series is produced by Yostar Pictures and directed by Yuki Watanabe. The first season, titled Arknights: Prelude to Dawn, aired from October to December 2022. A second season, titled Arknights: Perish in Frost, aired from October to November 2023. A third season, titled Arknights: Rise from Ember, aired from July to September 2025.

== Characters ==
This list is limited only to major characters that have appeared in both the game and the television anime and does not include those that have appeared only in the game.

Doctor (博士; Bóshì)
Voiced by: Feng Junhua (anime only) (Chinese); Yuki Kaida (anime only) (Japanese)
The main character of Arknights whose real name and identity is largely unknown, only referred to as "Doctor." They are one of the leaders of Rhodes Island, an expert in neurology and Oripathy, and command the Operators of Rhodes Island like a tactical genius.
Amiya (阿米娅; Āmǐyà)
Voiced by: Tao Dian (Chinese); Emma Ballantine (English); Tomoyo Kurosawa (Japanese); Lee Ji-hyun (Korean)
The poster-girl of Arknights and the public face of Rhodes Island in-universe. An Infected bunny-girl able to use magical Arts both offensively and defensively.
Kal'tsit (凯尔希; Kǎi'ěrxī)
Voiced by: Liu Xue (game), Huang Ling (anime) (Chinese); Sura Siu (English); Yōko Hikasa (Japanese)
The real leader of Rhodes Island in the Doctor's absence, she is herself a doctor managing most of the organization's affairs. Though not a combatant, she does have a monster (named "Mon3tr") that she can summon from her spine to attack enemies.
Wei Yenwu (魏彦吾; Wèi Yànwú)
Voiced by: Hai Fan (anime only; Prelude to Dawn), Wang Wei (anime only; Perish in Frost) (Chinese); Kōichi Yamadera (anime only) (Japanese)
A Qilin and the ruler of Lungmen, a semi-autonomous Mobile City within the greater Yan territory. An incredibly skilled politician, Wei was able to elevate Lungmen to a major power, while keeping a tight grip on law and order within the city.
Dobermann (杜宾; Dùbīn)
Voiced by: Guiniang (Chinese); Lucy Montgomery (English); Atsumi Tanezaki (Japanese); Kim Hyun-ji (Korean)
A Perro drill instructor for Rhodes Island who looks like a humanoid version of her namesake.
Jessica Brynley (杰西卡·布莱恩利; Jiéxīkǎ Bùlái'ēnlì)
Voiced by: Hou Xiaofei (Chinese); Yuuki Luna (Note: Replaced Rebecca LaChance.) (English); Ryō Hirohashi (Japanese); Kim Ha-young (Korean)
A timid Feline Operator from Blacksteel PMC, somehow able to afford to wield a pistol and ammo despite not being Sankta.
Franka (芙兰卡; Fúlánkǎ)
Voiced by: Vila (Chinese); Maya Aoki Tuttle (English); Ai Kakuma (Japanese); Park Ko-woon (Korean)
Vulpo Guard Operator who works for Blacksteel PMC, under contract with the Doctor at Rhodes Island
Liskarm (雷蛇; Léishé)
Voiced by: Ruoyu Zhang (Chinese); Megan Maczko (English); Yui Ishikawa (Japanese); Yi Sae-ah (Korean)
A Vouivre Defender Operator and Franka's partner in Blacksteel.
Ch'en Hui-chieh (陈晖洁; Chén Huījié)
Voiced by: Jen Zhang (Mandarin), Bao Shaoye (Cantonese) (Chinese); Amy Lennox (English); Shizuka Ishigami (Japanese); Chung Yu-joung (Korean)
Adopted daughter of Chief Wei and the head of the Lungmen Guard Department's Special Inspection Unit. She serves as the primary liaison between Rhodes Island and Lungmen.
Hoshiguma (星熊; Xīngxióng)
Voiced by: Cai Xinchun (Mandarin), Shi Xin (Cantonese) (Chinese); Meaghan Martin (English); Kiyono Yasuno (Japanese); Lee Sae-byeok (Korean)
A powerful Oni who works under Ch'en, wielding a large triangular shield with a Hannya on the front.
Swire (诗怀雅; Shīhuáiyǎ)
Voiced by: Ying Xie (Mandarin), Dong Dong (Cantonese) (Chinese); Emma Ballantine (English); Sora Tokui (Japanese); Kim Yul (Korean)
Senior Superintendent of the Lungmen Guard Department who often clashes with Ch'en.
Misha (米莎; Mǐshā)
Voiced by: Liang Shuang (anime only) (Chinese); Satsumi Matsuda (anime only) (Japanese)
An Ursus girl rescued by Rhodes Island Operators in Lungmen, but turns out to have ties to Skullshatterer of Reunion.
Blaze (煌; Huáng)
Voiced by: Zhou Tong (Chinese); Cristina Vee (English); Mai Nakahara (Japanese); Kim Yeon-woo (Korean)
Hot-blooded elite Operator for Rhodes Island who wields a superheated chainsaw in combat.
Exusiai (能天使; Néngtiānshǐ)
Voiced by: Cai Shujin (game), Muyaruilin (anime) (Chinese); Leonora Haig (later Shannon Tarbet) (English); Manaka Iwami (Japanese); Lee Ji-hyun (Korean)
Angelic Sankta and upbeat courier for Penguin Logistics in Lungmen, able to wield a submachinegun.
Cellinia Texas (切丽妮娜·德克萨斯; Sàilínnà Dékèsàsī)
Voiced by: Yang Menglu (Chinese); Jessica Preddy (English); Ilaria Silvestri (Italian); Azusa Tadokoro (Japanese); Kim Chae-ha (Korean)
Aloof-seeming Lupo courier for Penguin Logistics in Lungmen and Exusiai's partner.
Talulah Artorius (塔露拉·雅特利亚斯; Tǎlùlā Yǎtèlìyǎsī)
Voiced by: Zhou Shuai (Chinese); Maaya Sakamoto (Japanese)
The powerful leader of the Reunion movement who leads the group in their attacks on Chernobog and Lungmen, appears to have a history with Ch'en.
Ace (王牌; Wángpái)
Voiced by: Zhao Zihan (anime only) (Chinese); Takashi Matsuyama (anime only) (Japanese)
An elite Operator for Rhodes Island who sacrifices himself while fighting Talulah to help the Doctor and Amiya escape Chernobog.
Crownslayer (弑君者; Shìjūnzhě)
Voiced by: Chen Yanyi (Chinese); Evgeniya Vagan (English); Sayaka Senbongi (Japanese)
One of Reunion's elite troops, a Reproba able to perform quick and quiet assassinations.
Skullshatterer (碎骨; Suìgǔ)
Voiced by: Liang Shuang (anime only) (Chinese); Risae Matsuda (anime only) (Japanese)
One of Reunion's elite troops, an Ursus who wields a grenade launcher and boosts the morale of her comrades.
Faust (浮士德; Fúshìdé) / Sasha (萨沙; Sàshā)
Voiced by: Xu Xiang (anime only), Zhang Qi (anime only; Sasha) (Chinese); Shun Horie (anime only) (Japanese)
One of Reunion's elite troops, leading a unit of snipers while able to cloak himself.
Mephisto (梅菲斯特; Méifēisītè) / Eno (伊诺; Yīnuò)
Voiced by: Shen Dawei (anime only), Zhang Anqi (anime only; Eno) (Chinese); Kōhei Amasaki (anime only) (Japanese)
One of Reunion's elite troops, a sadistic boy who commands their forces in Chernobog, even though his actions sometimes come into conflict with other Reunion leaders.
Frostleaf (霜叶; Shuāngyè)
Voiced by: Ruan Congqing (Chinese); Ina Marie Smith (English); Ai Kakuma (Japanese); Jang Mi (Korean)
FrostNova (霜星; Shuāngxīng) / Yelena (叶莲娜; Yèliánnà)
Voiced by: KIYO (anime only) (Chinese); Ayahi Takagaki (anime only) (Japanese)
One of Reunions elite troops, a powerful Infected able to freeze the area around her in seconds, even though doing so subtracts her natural lifespan.
Lin Yühsia (林雨霞; Lín Yǔxiá)
Voiced by: Yan Meme (Mandarin), Xiantawutong (Cantonese) (Chinese); Artemis Snow (English); Kanae Itō (Japanese); Kang Eun-ae (Korean)
Margaret Nearl (玛嘉烈·临光; Mǎjiāliè Línguāng)
Voiced by: Mu Xueting (Chinese); Devora Wilde (English); Ayane Sakura (Japanese); Kim Ye-rim (Korean)
Wei Fumizuki (魏文月; Wèi Wényuè)
Voiced by: Huang Lei (anime only) (Chinese); Noriko Hidaka (anime only) (Japanese)
Chief Wei's wife, despite coming from outside of Yan. He often relies on her for moral support and advice.

== Development ==
The anime is a television series directed by Yuki Watanabe, with Masaki Nishikawa serving as assistant director, and Yuki Hayashi composing the music.

In December 2020, Hypergryph released a nine-minute Arknights anime video, "Holy Knight Light", on the occasion of the game's first global anniversary. It was made by the global publisher's in-house studio, Yostar Pictures, which previously made anime trailers for in-game events for the global version of the game.

In October 2021, Hypergryph published a teaser trailer for the first season ("Prelude to Dawn") of an anime adaptation of Arknights, also made by Yostar Pictures.

== Release ==
The first season aired from October 29 to December 17, 2022, on TV Tokyo in Japan. (Note: TV Tokyo lists the series premiere at 25:23 on October 28, 2022, which is effectively 1:23 a.m. JST on October 29.) Crunchyroll streamed the series. The opening theme song is "Alive" by Reona, and the ending theme song is "BE ME" by Doul.

A second season, "Perish in Frost", was announced at the end of the eighth episode and features returning staff and cast. It aired from October 7 to November 25, 2023, on TV Tokyo. The opening theme song is "Ache in Pulse" by Myth & Roid, and the ending theme song is "R.I.P" by Reona.

A third season, "Rise from Ember", was announced on April 27, 2024. It aired from July 4 to September 5, 2025, on Tokyo MX and other channels. The opening theme song is "End of Days" by Reona, and the ending theme song is "Truth" by Hana Itoki.

A spin-off miniseries, Lee's Detective Agency, began airing on Crunchyroll on December 23, 2022.

=== Episodes ===
No.	Title	Original release date
OVA	"Holy Knight Light"	December 26, 2020
On New Year's Eve, Penguin Logistics' owner Emperor (Kenjiro Tsuda) is tasked by police officer Hoshiguma to deliver a package to Rhodes Island's leader Amiya before midnight. Emperor and his employees Texas and Exusiai defy the Siracusan Mafia to deliver the package – a timebomb that turns out to be a cake, sent by police chief Ch'en as a prank.
1	"Predestination"; Transliteration: "Kakusei" (Japanese: 覚醒)	October 29, 2022
In the city of Chernobog within the Ursus Empire, a group of operators from the pharmaceutical company Rhodes Island led by their leader, Amiya, awakens and rescues their head strategist, the Doctor, who has gone under cold sleep in an underground facility. While helping the Doctor escape from militants of the Reunion Movement, Amiya and her second in command Dobermann discover the Doctor has amnesia and doesn't remember them. After being rescued by elite operator Ace and his team, the Doctor learns Reunion has taken advantage of a Catastrophe storm heading to Chernobog to start their uprising. With the Doctor's help, Amiya and the Rhodes Islanders rescue a mother and child from being killed by a group of Reunion militants. Despite their help, the mother refuses to follow her rescuers due to Amiya being infected with Oripathy. Amiya explains that Oripathy is the result of being exposed to the valuable Originium mineral and despite evidence that physical contact with an Infected will not transmit the disease, many nations are fearful of the Infected due to misinformation, leading to discrimination against them. Unlike the Reunion Movement who wants to overthrow the world's governments for their harsh treatment against the Infected, Rhodes Island seeks to find a cure for Oripathy and end the discrimination, which the Doctor was researching for a cure before their amnesia. As the Rhodes Islanders head to their rendezvous point to escape, they are unaware that another Reunion unit is watching them.
2	"Flame"; Transliteration: "Kitai" (Japanese: 危殆)	November 5, 2022
Ursus news claims the government has suppressed the riots, when in reality they are quickly losing control of the city. Amiya and the Rhodes Islanders walk through a park but are attacked by Reunion force led by Crownslayer, who kidnaps the Doctor. Crownslayer interrogates the Doctor, but she is forced to retreat when Mephisto, another Reunion captain, confronts her. Mephisto tries to capture the Doctor himself but reinforcements led by Nearl rescues them and the Doctor. They then retreat after being attacked by a sniper named Faust, Mephisto's partner. While resting in a ransacked secret clinic for the Infected, Amiya explains to the Doctor how Originium is the source for Arts, their world's magic and the power source that modernized their world, and while the Infected can use Arts using the Originium inside their body without a Originium conduit, it is a dangerous thing to do so since this causes their Oripathy to spread much faster and shorten their lifespan. Rhodes Island head to their rendezvous point but are attacked by a large fire Arts cast by the leader of Reunion, Talulah.
3	"Escort"; Transliteration: "Kikan" (Japanese: 帰還)	November 12, 2022
Amiya does her best to shield the Doctor and her friends from both Talulah's attacks and falling meteors from a Catastrophe, but quickly reaches her limit. Ace and his team decide to stay behind to hold off Talulah and her forces to give time for the others to escape. The Rhodes Island team is able to reach their extraction point, but are confronted by another Reunion officer named W. However, W claims she just wanted to see if the Doctor is present and takes her leave. Meanwhile, Ace, heavily injured, takes a wounded Guard to safety before heading back out to sacrifice himself to distract the Reunion forces. The Rhodes Island team is extracted and transported back to the Rhodes Island landship, dejected at Ace's death. During the trip, Amiya explains Catastrophes are caused by Originium, and spread large Originium crystals around the land, which is why mobile cities were developed to avoid them. After getting some rest, the Doctor tours the landship before reuniting with Amiya and assuring her that her ideals are not mistaken. Later, Dobermann briefs the Doctor and Amiya that their next destination is the city of Lungmen, which they believe is Reunion's next target.
4	"Loyalty"; Transliteration: "Keiyaku" (Japanese: 契約)	November 19, 2022
The Doctor is introduced to Blacksteel PMC contractors Liskarm and Franka as Rhodes Island makes its way to Lungmen, while the massive mobile city is enforcing stricter policies against the Ursus refugees, fearing the Infected might be sneaking in. the Doctor, Amiya and Dr. Kal'tsit, Head of Rhodes Medical Department and Amiya's guardian, meets with the city's leader Wei Yenwu, and Inspector Ch'en of the Lungmen Guard Department, trying to convince them of the danger that their anti-Infected policies might have in feeding more downtrodden Infected towards Reunion. The two sides spend several minutes negotiating a deal to let Rhodes Island operate in Lungmen in exchange for helping Inspector Ch'en police the Infected citizens. Soon after agreeing to a contract, Ch'en has the Rhodes Island group hunt down a white-haired Ursus girl named Misha. The group finds her in the slums, running away from some thugs, and Amiya manages to gain Misha's trust. Meanwhile, a special unit of Reunion is watching them from a nearby rooftop.
5	"Ripple"; Transliteration: "Shinrai" (Japanese: 信頼)	November 26, 2022
Misha loses trust in Amiya after overhearing her talking with Ch'en about handing Misha to the LGD, but reluctantly stays with them. The slums are full of Reunion soldiers and sympathizers, so the Doctor's group relies on the help of Penguin Logistics employees Exusiai and Texas to find a safe route out of the neighborhood. The group is ambushed by a Reunion unit led by someone in a dark cloak and gas mask, but Texas and Exusiai help the Doctor's group escape. Misha starts losing strength and reveals she is a Chernobog refugee, and that Oripathy lesions have started growing on her leg. Amiya gives her emergency treatment to slow the infection. As the group moves towards the rendezvous point, Amiya decides to help break up a fight between two groups of Infected, though one of the fighters responds harshly that the slums are his home, and he has nowhere to evacuate to. Later, Misha decides to trust in Amiya again.
6	"Farewell"; Transliteration: "Kyūshū" (Japanese: 急襲)	December 3, 2022
The Doctor's group hands Misha over to Ch'en and the LGD. Ch'en tells Misha that her father was one of Chernobog's best scientists, and that Reunion wants to capture her, so Misha is being taken into protective custody. Suddenly, the LGD caravan is ambushed by Reunion forces led by explosives expert W and the gas-masked person from before, named Skullshatterer. W manages to escape with Misha while Skullshatterer keeps the Doctor's group occupied, and Talulah herself begins to assault the LGD headquarters. Ch'en decides to tell Amiya why Misha is important to both Reunion and the LGD. Rhodes Island Operators assist the LGD as they engage in open street warfare against Reunion, with Inspector Hoshiguma saving Ch'en from a potentially fatal crossbow bolt.
7	"Separation"; Transliteration: "Kaigō" (Japanese: 邂逅)	December 10, 2022
Misha awakens in a Reunion hideout with Skullshatterer, whose real identity is her brother, an Infected named Alex. Alex tells Misha why he joined Reunion and hopes Misha will join as well. Texas and Exusiai spy on the hideout from afar, and relay the location to Amiya, while Alex teaches Misha how to use his Arts-powered grenade launcher. As Rhodes Island and LGD forces approach the hideout to rescue Misha, W tells Skullshatterer to target the Doctor for a quick victory. Both sides charge at each other in an abandoned rock quarry. The Doctor survives a direct strike from Skullshatterer thanks to Hoshiguma. Skullshatterer fights off Hoshiguma and uses his Arts to turn himself into a suicide bomb. Before Skullshatterer can reach the Doctor, a desperate Amiya pierces his body with her own Arts before he can detonate himself, killing him. Amiya is horrified at her new deadly Arts, while Reunion forces rally to get back Skullshatterer's body, and Misha breaks down after witnessing Amiya kill Alex.
8	"Departure"; Transliteration: "Kiro" (Japanese: 岐路)	December 17, 2022
Both sides are licking their wounds as a sandstorm rolls through the quarry. W suddenly appears at the LGD camp to give Amiya a two-way radio before escaping. Misha blames Amiya for her brother's death over the radio, and decides to take Alex's place with Reunion. Ch'en reiterates her mission to get Misha back for the LGD, and Amiya decides to try talking to Misha again. Back at the Reunion camp, Misha decides to take up the mantle of Skullshatterer herself. As the sandstorm passes, the combined LGD and Rhodes Island force slowly push their way through Reunion's forces, but can't locate Misha. Suddenly, Skullshatterer reappears on the battlefield and rallies the Reunion forces. Amiya confronts Skullshatterer by herself and deduces that Misha is wearing his outfit. Before Misha can pull the trigger on Amiya, Ch'en impales Misha on her sword, leading the remaining Reunion forces to surrender. Ch'en yells at Amiya for hesitating and nearly allowing herself to be killed. As Amiya questions whether her ideals still matter in this world, the Doctor encourages her to remain hopeful, as Amiya was able to rescue them with her ideals.
9	"Conspiracy"; Transliteration: "Jo Uta" (Japanese: 序歌)	October 7, 2023
Kal'tsit orders Rhodes Operators Meteorite, Frostleaf and Blacksteel operator Jessica to scout an abandoned city located in the outskirts of Lungmen to find and rescue survivors, only to encounter Reunion. Meanwhile, Amiya still regrets not taking action to save Misha but finds comfort after seeing Ch'en talking to an orphan that Misha cared for and also showing remorse for Misha. After Kal'tsit reveals they have lost contact with Meteorite's team, the Doctor, Amiya, Ch'en and Hoshiguma leads a Rhodes/LGD rescue team to find them and stop Reunion. During their search, Ch'en sees Talulah and tries but fails to find her. The Doctor and Amiya are reunited with Meteorite's team which Frostleaf warns they must leave before the Reunion captain whose causing the city's temperature to turn cold will find them. Mephisto goads Amiya to come out of hiding after his men burn a building fill with dead civilians. Before Amiya can fight Mephisto and his men, the entire area is frozen due to the arrival of the Reunion leader of the "Yetis", FrostNova.
10	"Peril"; Transliteration: "Henkyoku" (Japanese: 変局)	October 14, 2023
Mephisto reveals the people he killed were the wealthiest of Chernobog who cowardly fled when the Catastrophe hit the city, which disgusts FrostNova. As they argue, Amiya and her team use the opportunity to escape. While hiding from the Yetis, Amiya uses her Arts to calm Jessica after the latter suffers a panic attack from seeing FrostNova's Ice Arts. Amiya and the others try to regroup with the LGD, only to be cornered by the Yetis. Frostleaf tries to sacrifice herself after suffering frostbite from FrostNova's attack, but the others refuse to leave her behind and fight the Yetis to rescue Frostleaf. As FrostNova sings an Arts Incantation to freeze her enemies, the Doctor orders the team to destroy nearby Originium shards to disrupt FrostNova's spell and escape after FrostNova gets sick. As Patriot, FrostNova's adoptive father, warns her daughter not to overuse her powers, Talulah commences the next stage of her plans; attacking Lungmen. Amiya manages to contact Ch'en only to learn from the latter that Reunion has attacked Lungmen.
11	"Conceal"; Transliteration: "Koō" (Japanese: 呼応)	October 21, 2023
As Ch'en leads her LGD forces to retake Lungmen, she is criticized by her partners, Hoshiguma and Swire, for not acting like herself and abandoning Amiya and her team to pursue Reunion. When Ch'en learns her Reunion informant, Phal, has his identity compromised, Ch'en leads a rescue team to save him. However, Phal later dies after being tortured, but not before revealing a location that Talulah is interested in. Ch'en heads to that location, which is revealed to be her father's home, which Ch'en doesn't have fond memories of her father before going inside and finding a picture of her and Talulah as children. While retaking Paci Plaza (which is owned by Swire's family), Ch'en refuses to abandon Hoshiguma after the latter protects her from an explosion out of guilt for abandoning Amiya. After retaking the Plaza and getting Hoshiguma treated for her injuries, Ch'en assembles her forces to retake the LGD headquarters.
12	"Salvation"; Transliteration: "Miketsu" (Japanese: 未決)	October 28, 2023
13	"Resign"; Transliteration: "Tsuioku" (Japanese: 追憶)	November 4, 2023
14	"Blooming"; Transliteration: "Seichō" (Japanese: 征兆)	November 11, 2023
15	"Sacrifice"; Transliteration: "Sōshiki" (Japanese: 相識)	November 18, 2023
16	"Lullabye"; Transliteration: "Hyōshaku" (Japanese: 氷釈)	November 25, 2023
17	"Confession"; Transliteration: "Ribetsu" (Japanese: 離別)	July 4, 2025
18	"Consumables"; Transliteration: "Kōkō" (Japanese: 向光)	July 11, 2025
19	"Mission"; Transliteration: "Heiki" (Japanese: 兵器)	July 18, 2025
20	"Patriot"; Transliteration: "Unmei" (Japanese: 運命)	July 25, 2025
21	"Vengeance"; Transliteration: "Shitsugo" (Japanese: 失序)	August 1, 2025
22	"Recurrence"; Transliteration: "Rinretsu" (Japanese: 凛冽)	August 8, 2025
23	"Stain"; Transliteration: "Nukarumi" (Japanese: 泥濘)	August 15, 2025
24	"Recall"; Transliteration: "Zankyō" (Japanese: 残響)	August 22, 2025
25	"Inferno"; Transliteration: "Kakudo" (Japanese: 赫怒)	August 29, 2025
26	"Dawn"; Transliteration: "Reimei" (Japanese: 黎明)	September 5, 2025
