= The Guy She Was Interested in Wasn't a Guy at All =

Japanese manga series by Sumiko Arai

- First tankōbon volume cover, featuring Mitsuki Koga (left) and Aya Osawa (right)

気になってる人が男じゃなかった (Ki ni Natteru Hito ga Otoko Janakatta)
- Genre: Yuri; Slice of life
- Manga
- Written by: Sumiko Arai
- Published by: Kadokawa Shoten
- English publisher: NA: Yen Press
- Magazine: Pixiv Comic
- Original run: April 10, 2022 – present
- Volumes: 4
- Anime television series
- Directed by: Masashi Ishihama
- Written by: Rino Yamasaki
- Music by: Kosuke Noma; Takayuki "Kojiro" Sasaki
- Studio: CloverWorks
- Licensed by: Crunchyroll
- Original network: NNS (Nippon TV)
- Original run: January 8, 2027 – scheduled
- icon

The Guy She Was Interested in Wasn't a Guy at All (Japanese: 気になってる人が男じゃなかった, Hepburn: Ki ni Natteru Hito ga Otoko Janakatta), abbreviated as KiniOto (きにおと) and also popularly known as the Green Yuri due to its distinct green accent color, is a Japanese manga series written and illustrated by Sumiko Arai. Originating as a short story posted on Arai's Twitter account from July to September 2021, the series has been self-published on the platform since April 2022. It has been also serialized on Pixiv Comic and published in print by Kadokawa Shoten since April 2023, with its chapters collected in four tankōbon volumes as of February 2026.

The series follows the friendship and eventual romantic relationship between high school girls Aya Osawa and Mitsuki Koga, who connect through their love for rock music and reflect on how much they value each other in their daily lives. An anime television series adaptation produced by CloverWorks is set to premiere in January 2027. The series has been a critical and commercial success, with critics praising the story, artwork, and characters. It won the 2023 Next Manga Award in the web manga category.

== Plot ==
Aya Osawa develops a crush on the masked clerk of the record store she frequents where they discuss and share their love for rock music. Unbeknownst to her, the record store clerk is her female classmate Mitsuki Koga, who tries to conceal her double life. Amidst their day-to-day experiences within and beyond high school with their friends, Aya and Mitsuki jointly discover how much they mean to each other, as their friendship formed through music blossoms into a deeper love for one another.

== Characters ==
=== Main ===
Mitsuki Koga (古賀 美月, Koga Mitsuki)
Voiced by: Mariya Ise (drama CD, anime)
An aloof high school who has a love for rock music and works part-time at the record store with her uncle Joe. She experienced an introverted upbringing due to her desire to stay true to herself and not compromise on it. To maintain anonymity during work, Mitsuki wears a facemask and androgynous clothing in place of her school uniform, causing her to be mistaken for a guy and be dubbed by Aya and her friends as "Onii-san" (お兄さん). After Aya falls for Onii-san, she takes measures for Aya to not figure out her identity while befriending her at school. Eventually, as time passes, Mitsuki also falls for Aya and becomes confident in expressing her true self to her, allowing them to begin dating. She also learns how to play the electric guitar, which she would utilize to compose her own songs.
Aya Osawa (大沢 綾, Ōsawa Aya)
Voiced by: Akari Kitō (drama CD, anime)
An extroverted gyaru high school girl who also has a love for rock music after becoming intrigued with The Dark Side of the Moon. However, she is unable to share her interests with Chizuru and Mao due to their preference for pop music and out of fear of being alienated. Harboring no romantic interest towards men, Aya develops a crush on Mitsuki's workplace persona after their first encounter, prompting her to dub the enigmatic clerk as Onii-san. Aya continues to frequent the shop to see Onii-san while becoming acquainted with Mitsuki at school, not knowing that she is Onii-san. After learning of her identity and formally befriending her, Aya comes to value her as her own person and supports her aspirations while making her own decisions and becoming more free-spirited, leading to them dating.

=== Supporting ===
Joe (譲, Jō)
Voiced by: Kenjiro Tsuda (drama CD, anime)
Mitsuki's uncle who manages the record store and serves as her parental figure and guardian, often showing concern for his niece's introverted upbringing. It is later revealed that he was in a romantic relationship with Kanna when Mitsuki was young, but they broke up as he was prioritizing taking care of Mitsuki when Kanna proposed moving to Los Angeles with him. Despite their amicable breakup, Joe continues to harbor feelings for Kanna, especially after they reconnect.
Megumu Narita (成田 恵, Narita Megumu)
Voiced by: Tasuku Hatanaka (drama CD, anime)
A friend and classmate of Aya and Mitsuki who was the first to connect Mitsuki and Onii-san being the same person after noticing their similarities. Smarmy yet kind, Narita comes to support Aya and Mitsuki's relationship and acts as their wingman and matchmaker, making efforts to have both girls interact, get close to each other, and avoid miscommunication.
Chizuru (ちづる)
Voiced by: Erina Koga (drama CD), Yurina Amami (anime)
A classmate of Aya and part of her gyaru friend group. She tends to offer Aya advice on how she can approach her crush on Onii-san using her levelheaded and reasonable demeanor, unaware that Onii-san is fellow classmate Mitsuki. She is also close friends with Mao and Narita.
Mao (まお)
Voiced by: Nene Hieda (drama CD), Fairouz Ai (anime)
Another classmate of Aya and part of her gyaru friend group. She is highly supportive of Aya's efforts to connect with Onii-san. She is also easygoing and approachable to others, allowing her to befriend Mitsuki and Narita.
Amu Osawa (大沢 あむ, Ōsawa Amu) and Aki Osawa (大沢 あき, Ōsawa Aki)
Aya's boisterous younger twin brothers. They both view and adore Mitsuki as their role model growing up, openly rooting for the two girls and becoming accustomed to their same-sex relationship.
Kanna (カンナ)
Voiced by: Maiko Nomura
Joe's ex-girlfriend and a friend of Mitsuki who works as a stylist in Los Angeles. She temporarily returns to Japan and spends time with Joe and Mitsuki, though she still experiences lingering feelings towards Joe despite their previous breakup. She also befriends and bonds with Aya on their respective struggles towards romance.
Hime Hasegawa (長谷川 ひめ, Hasegawa Hime)
A high school girl who is Aya and Mitsuki's junior and is the daughter of a record producer. She holds Mitsuki's songwriting with high regard.
Shu (シュウ)
Aya and Narita's college classmate who begrudgingly hangs out with them. She finds herself feeling bothered yet drawn to Aya's free-spirited demeanor and personality.
Rinko (リンコ)
Mitsuki's colleague at a bar that was the former site of the record store. She is self-conscious of her tall height and lack of social skills and deeply admires Mitsuki's confidence.

== Production ==
=== Conceptualization ===
In an interview with Shuko Yokoi, Sumiko Arai elaborated that the concept of The Guy She Was Interested in Wasn't a Guy at All originated from her being drawn to stories about individuals from differing backgrounds connecting and wanting to tell a story about girls, noting in another interview with Anime News Network that "women-loving-women [media] in general is unique and special as it is". In order for her concepts to also resonate and be accessible with international readers, Arai drew short stories featuring no dialogue, which were posted to her Twitter account. One of these short stories, uploaded between July and September 2021, served as the inspiration to the series.

Arai decided to incorporate music, specifically Western rock music, as a major element in the series after drawing from her own experiences of falling in love with rock through her father introducing her to Beck and his album Guero, as well as growing up listening to other Western rock artists such as the Beatles, Half Moon Run, and Deftones. She also expounded on its importance by noting that music allows an individual to relate their emotions and feelings to a given piece, adding it is a great way to "find a community". In creating the characters of Mitsuki Koga and Aya Osawa, Arai shared she used the extroverted and introverted aspects of herself as inspiration in writing them while also referring to the characters of Shelby Goodkind and Toni Shalifoe in The Wilds, creating a "polar-opposite kind of pairing".

Most chapters of the series are limited to four pages due to Twitter originally allowing a maximum of four images per post. (Note: A November 12, 2026 update increased the number of image attachments per post.) Arai has remarked on having to depict Mitsuki and Aya's interactions concisely as a result of the format. The series' editor commented that the character's faces are illustrated to be detailed enough to understand the story without relying on the dialogue. The yellow-green color, which serves as an accent to the series' black-and-white illustrations and has since become a popular aspect of its design identity, was revealed by Arai to be a last-minute addition before the first chapter was uploaded.

=== Anime adaptation ===
As music is an integral element within the series, Kosuke Noma and Takayuki "Kojiro" Sasaki composed the anime's original soundtrack, with recording sessions taking place both in Tokyo and Los Angeles. Noma, who admitted the anime series is his first time composing an original soundtrack, and Sasaki expressed their excitement in the soundtrack's production enriching the anime while being inspired by the licensed rock songs featured in the original work.

== Media ==
=== Manga ===
Written and illustrated by Sumiko Arai, the series began its weekly run on the author's Twitter account on April 10, 2022; it was also serialized on Pixiv Comic on April 29, 2023. Kadokawa Shoten began publishing the series in print in the same month, with its chapters collected in four tankōbon volumes as of February 2026. Arai announced on April 3, 2024, that the series would be receiving an official English release alongside other international releases, with Yen Press later announcing on April 26 they had licensed the series for English publication.

==== Volumes ====
No.	Original release date	Original ISBN	English release date	English ISBN
1	April 19, 2023	978-4-04-681732-7	October 22, 2024	978-1-9753-9968-9
"Rhythm A"; Chapter 1. "Teen Spirit"; Chapter 2. "Creep"; Chapter 3. "Don't Stop"; "Rhythm B"
Aya Osawa encounters a record store on her way home and develops a crush on its clerk. Unbeknownst to Aya, the clerk is her classmate Mitsuki Koga, who is reluctant to clear up the misunderstanding to Aya. In spite of this, she enjoys Aya's company in the record store and talk about their love for rock music. Mitsuki also bonds with Aya at school alongside Megumu Narita, who figures out her double life. Mitsuki urges Narita to maintain the secrecy, but Aya eventually discovers the connection. Aya is disappointed at Mitsuki's unwillingness to clarify herself and avoids her. With the help of Narita and her uncle Joe, Mitsuki performs at the school festival to make amends with Aya, and they become friends as the year passes. The two girls win tickets to a Red Hot Chili Peppers concert, though Mitsuki worries she is taking Aya's time away from Chizuru and Mao. Mitsuki gives her ticket to Chizuru, leaving a shocked Aya to confront her. Mitsuki then recalls growing up losing her only friend in elementary and becoming introverted as a result of wanting to stay true to herself. When Aya arrived at the store and shared the same interests in rock, Mitsuki aspired to grow close to Aya.
2	February 27, 2024	978-4-04-683173-6	February 18, 2025	979-8-8554-1259-8
Chapter 4. "Caring"; Chapter 5. "Rock 'N' Roll"; Chapter 6. "Song 1"
Mitsuki apologizes to Aya for the mishap, and Aya has her join her friend group consisting of Chizuru, Mao, and Narita at the start of their final school year. They also meet Joe's ex-girlfriend Kanna, who has returned from America and also takes care of Mitsuki. Joe reveals that he and Kanna shared the same aspirations of moving to America but broke up due to Joe prioritizing Mitsuki's wellbeing. Hearing this, Aya reflects on her burgeoning friendship with Mitsuki. During their class trip to Okinawa, Aya notices Mitsuki muttering on her aimlessness after graduation. Aya lifts her spirits by singing at their class karaoke session, and Mitsuki realizes her feelings for Aya. After returning home, Mitsuki receives a burst of inspiration to write and compose her own music. Aya sees this and assumes Mitsuki is closing herself off, as she connects with Kanna on their similar predicaments. Mitsuki later privately invites Aya at a live house to listen to her songs after Mitsuki received a note from Aya proclaiming she is her first fan. Aya becomes enamored with Mitsuki's songs and proposes she share it to a wider audience.
3	February 20, 2025	978-4-04-684257-2	December 23, 2025	979-8-8554-2797-4
Chapter 7. "Wish You Were"; Chapter 8. "24H Radio"; Chapter 9. "Should I Stay, or..."
Mitsuki is hesitant to share her songs and wonders how Aya views her since reconciling. Aya assures Mitsuki that she values her, and they join Joe, Kanna, and Narita to Fuji Rock Festival. Aya and Mitsuki continue to grow close, while Kanna and Joe reconnect. Mitsuki also becomes popular in school after videos of her impromptu public performance go viral, catching the interest of Hime Hasegawa. However, other students bully Mitsuki by openly mocking her lyrics, distressing Mitsuki. Aya defends her and furiously rebukes her bullies. Despite Mitsuki thanking her, Aya becomes concerned at whether she is a good friend to her. Hime discovers Mitsuki's songs, while Narita sets up their school's Christmas prom to help Aya. In its lead-up, Aya hears Hime inviting Mitsuki to a music industry party on the same day as the prom. Aya is saddened she cannot experience prom with Mitsuki, and Kanna voices her regret to Joe on not realizing their aspirations together before preparing to fly back to America. Recognizing they are squandering a once-in-a-lifetime opportunity, Mitsuki and Joe jointly rush to reunite with Aya and Kanna.
4	February 19, 2026	978-4-04-607724-0	October 27, 2026	979-8-8554-4420-9
Chapter 10. "Bodies"; Chapter 11. "Medicine"; Chapter 12. "Supersonic"
Joe declares his recommitment to Kanna upon seeing that Mitsuki is able to depend on Aya. Back at prom, Mitsuki and Aya confirm their feelings for each other and share their first kiss. Mitsuki and Aya begin dating and gleefully reminisce on their first meeting. They also welcome Hime, who was dismayed by Mitsuki's absence at the party, to their group. Aya prepares for her entrance exams, but she grows anxious for her future. Mitsuki senses Aya's stress, so Hime suggests they compose an album exclusively for Aya to motivate her. Aya fears she will be left behind and Mitsuki comforts Aya, remarking she will love her regardless of how she might change. Aya passes her exams as Mitsuki shares the completed album to her after graduation. Some months later, Aya and Mitsuki live together, and Joe has moved to America with Kanna. Aya attends college with Narita, while Mitsuki works as a bartender and session musician. Mitsuki expresses excitement for her new band, though she is disheartened when her bandmates prioritize short-term success. When Aya comes to her band's concert, a stunned Mitsuki freezes mid-performance.
5	January 13, 2027	978-4-04-330271-0; 978-4-04330-273-4 (LE)	—	—

=== Anime ===
An anime adaptation was announced by Arai on Twitter and Kadokawa on February 20, 2025, to coincide with the release of the third volume. It was later revealed at Anime Expo 2026 to be a television series produced by CloverWorks and directed by Masashi Ishihama, with script supervision by Rino Yamasaki, character designs by Kanna Hirayama, and music by Kosuke Noma with Takayuki "Kojiro" Sasaki composing and performing the guitar music. It is set to premiere on January 8, 2027, on the Friday Anime Night programming block on Nippon Television and its affiliates. (Note: The first episode held an advanced screening at Lucca Comics & Games on October 29, 2026 and Anime Frontier on December 6, 2026.) The opening theme song is "Breed", originally performed by Nirvana for their 1991 album Nevermind. Crunchyroll will stream the series.

=== Other ===
Universal Music Japan released an official playlist containing songs that Mitsuki and Aya listen throughout the series as part of the first volume's release, featuring songs from rock artists such as Nirvana, Turnstile, and Royal Blood, among others. The playlist is periodically updated after the release of a succeeding volume. Arai has also commented on how select songs from the playlist represent Mitsuki and Aya's progress in their relationship. A pop-up store selling merchandise from the series was open in Ikebukuro from September 15–24 and in Nagoya from September 30 to October 9, 2023. A drama CD adaptation was released on April 24, 2024.

== Reception ==
The first volume sold 150,000 copies within a week of its release. The manga had over 200,000 copies in circulation by September 2023; over 400,000 copies in circulation by February 2024; over 840,000 copies in circulation by December 2024; over 1.40 million copies in circulation by November 2025; and over 2.25 million copies in circulation by August 2026.

A columnist for Animate Times praised the artwork, particularly its use of color, and the story's progression. Momo Tachibana of Real Sound praised the main characters and their interactions, describing them as understandable. Erica Friedman felt the story was "not the first of it's [sic] kind" but that it handled its subject better than similar series. Friedman also praised the artwork and its use of black, white, and green. Lucas Kloberdanz-Dyck of Collider praised the manga for its tasteful exploration of queer relationships. Dave Grohl, the frontman of the Foo Fighters and former drummer of Nirvana, endorsed the series following the announcement of the anime licensing "Breed" for its use as the opening theme, remarking in an interview with Arai that its messages and aesthetics would have resonated with his late bandmate and friend Kurt Cobain and that he "would have loved this".

=== Awards and nominations ===
Year	Award	Category	Result	Ref.
2023	9th Next Manga Award	Web Manga	Won	
2023	Da Vinci 23rd Annual Book of the Year	Book of the Year	2nd place	
2024	Kono Manga ga Sugoi! List of Best Manga	Female Readers	2nd place	
2025	Japan Expo Awards	Daruma for Best Romance Manga	Won	
2025	Harvey Awards	Best Manga	Nominated	
2025	2nd American Manga Awards	Best New Manga	Won	
2025	31st Manga Barcelona Awards	Best Yuri	Won	
2025	Google Play Best Books	Favorite Manga	Won	
2025	Ridibooks Comic Award	Best GL Award	Won	
2026	14th Minami Manga Award	Minami Manga Prize	Won	
2026	Maverick Graphic Novels Reading List	Grades 9–12	Won	
