= Yurina Amami =

Japanese voice actress

- 天海 由梨奈
- Born: July 7, 1996 (age 30); Kanagawa Prefecture, Japan
- Occupation: Voice actress
- Years active: 2015–present
- Agent: 81 Produce
- Notable work: Sorairo Utility as Haruka Akane; Dealing with Mikadono Sisters Is a Breeze as Kazuki Mikadono; Botan Kamiina Fully Blossoms When Drunk as Akane Yusa; Umamusume: Pretty Derby as Mr. C. B.

Yurina Amami (天海 由梨奈, Amami Yurina; born July 7, 1996) is a Japanese voice actress from Kanagawa Prefecture who is affiliated with 81 Produce. She made her voice acting debut in 2015, and has voiced roles such as Haruka Akane in Sorairo Utility, Mr. C. B. in Umamusume: Pretty Derby, and Kazuki Mikadono in Dealing with Mikadono Sisters Is a Breeze.

== Biography ==
Amami was born in Kanagawa Prefecture on July 7, 1996. She had an interest in anime and voice acting from an early age, although she did not see herself becoming a voice actress at first. As a child, she was more interested in outdoor activities than staying indoors. During her junior high school years, she initially did not join any clubs, but joined the table tennis club at a friend's suggestion during her second year, as it was at risk of being disbanded due to a lack of members. While in high school, she became a member of the school brass band, with her playing the saxophone. She majored in philosophy in university while also taking up voice acting lessons at a training school.

In 2014, Amami participated in an audition held by the talent agency 81 Produce, where she passed and received multiple awards. She became affiliated with 81 Produce in 2017. Among her early roles was as Mr. C. B. in the multimedia franchise Umamusume: Pretty Derby, which was the first role she successfully passed an audition for. She was also among three winners of an open audition for the mobile game BraveSword×BlazeSoul, where the three were chosen from 1,101 applicants. In 2021, she voiced Haruka Akane in the anime television special Sorairo Utility; she and her co-stars also performed the special's theme song "Gunjō Love Theory". She would later reprise the role for its television series adaptation in 2025. In 2025, she voiced Kazuki Mikadono in the anime series Dealing with Mikadono Sisters Is a Breeze; she also performed one of the series' ending themes "Aimai Graffiti".

== Filmography ==
=== Anime ===
2021

- Sorairo Utility, Haruka

2024

- Magilumiere Magical Girls Inc., Akane Makino

2025

- Sorairo Utility, Haruka Akane
- Dealing with Mikadono Sisters Is a Breeze, Kazuki Mikadono

2026

- Eren the Southpaw, Yurina Mitsuhashi
- Botan Kamiina Fully Blossoms When Drunk, Akane Yusa
- I Made Friends with the Second Prettiest Girl in My Class, Kyoka Minato
- Tank Chair, Dr. Radio

2027

- The Guy She Was Interested in Wasn't a Guy at All, Chizuru

=== Video games ===
- BraveSword×BlazeSoul, Alice (2017)
- Umamusume: Pretty Derby, Mr. C. B. (2021)
- Action Taimanin, Lapis (2024)
- Blue Archive, Kakehashi Subaru (2025)
- Nekopara: Sekai Connect, Churro (2026)
