= Tsutaya Books Daikanyama =

Bookstore in Tokyo

Coordinates: 35.6489°N 139.6998°E

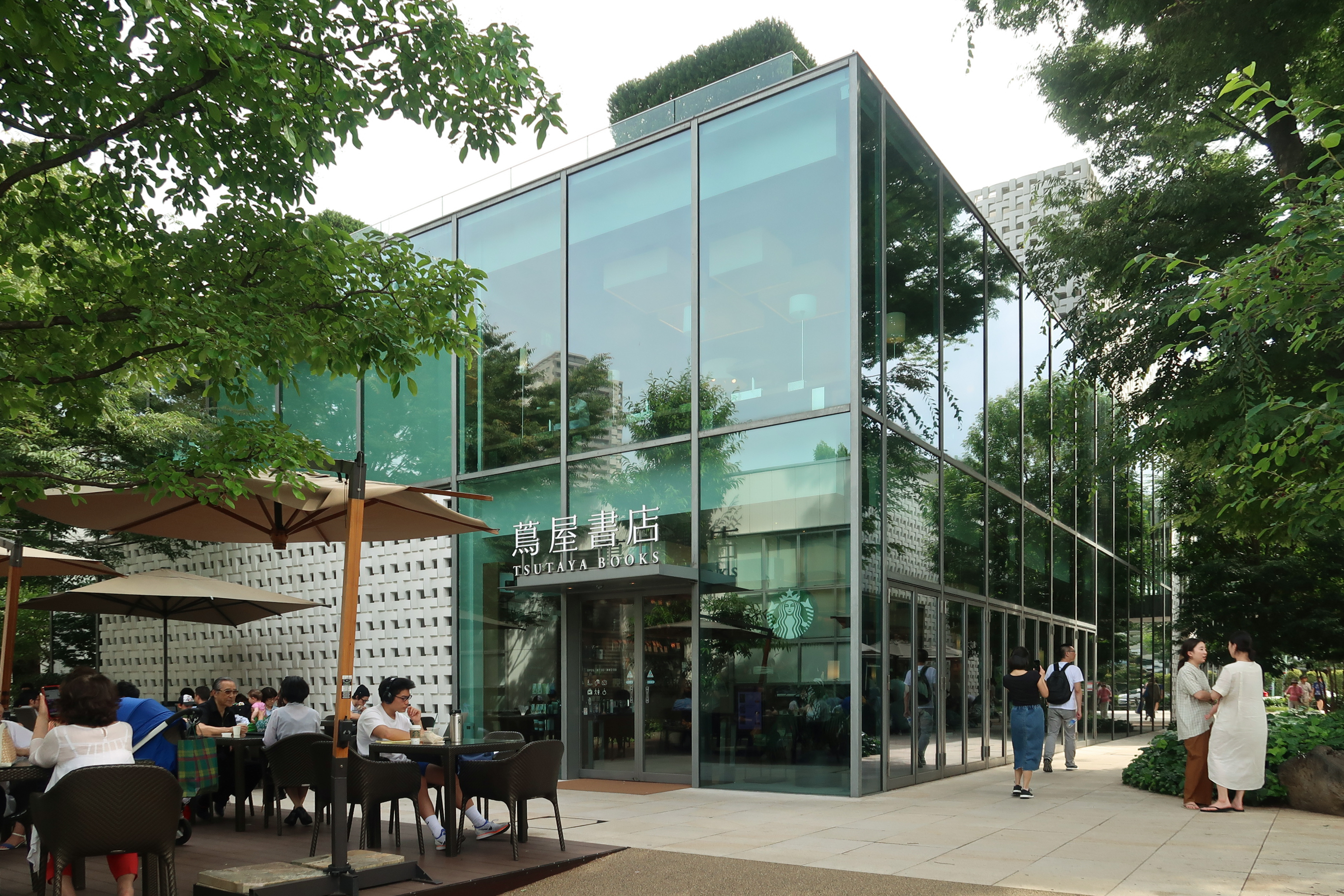

General information
- Completed: 2011

Design and construction
- Architecture firm: Klein Dytham Architecture

Tsutaya Books Daikanyama (代官山 蔦屋書店), also known as T-site Daikanyama (代官山T-SITE), is a bookstore in the Daikanyama neighbourhood of Shibuya, Tokyo, Japan. Housed in an award-winning purpose-built complex, it has been named by the Financial Times as one of "the most brilliant bookshops in the world".

It is a branch of the Tsutaya chain of video rental shops and bookstores operated by Culture Convenience Club throughout Japan and Taiwan.

The building was designed by Klein Dytham Architecture in 2011. In 2013 it won the Grand Prize at the Design for Asia Awards, and an award for best shopping centre at the World Architecture Festival. Its design concept has been described as "library in a forest", with a layout and T-shaped design motifs that reflect Tsutaya's logo.
