= Culture Convenience Club =

Japanese video rental and bookstore chain

Culture Convenience Club Company, Limited

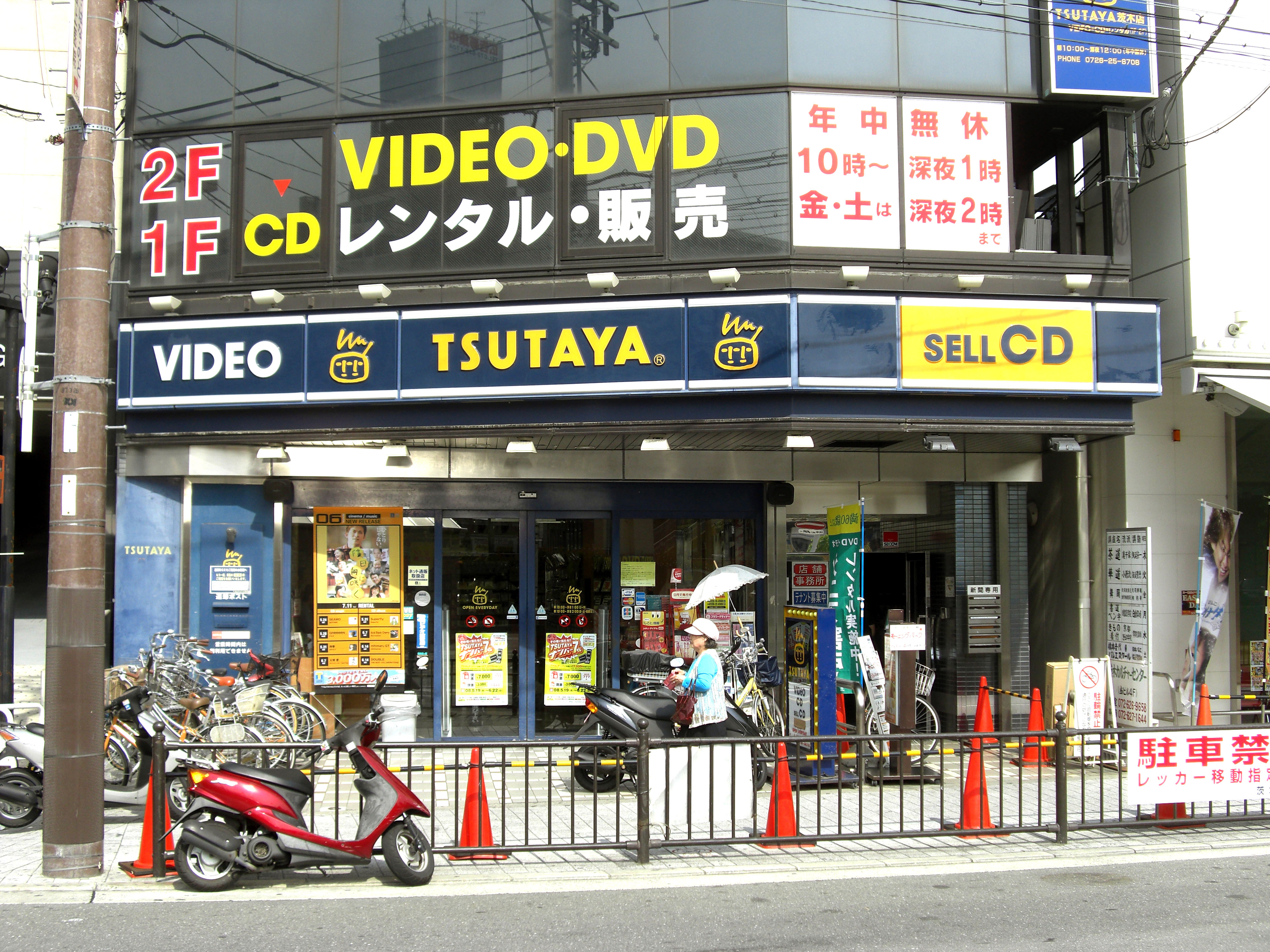
- A Tsutaya shop in Ibaraki, Osaka
- Native name: カルチュア・コンビニエンス・クラブ株式会社
- Romanized name: Karuchua Konbiniensu Kurabu Kabushikigaisha
- Type: Private KK
- Industry: Video rental shop Bookselling
- Founded: Hirakata, Osaka (1982)
- Founder: Muneaki Masuda
- Headquarters: Tokyo, Japan
- Area served: Japan; Taiwan; Malaysia; China
- Key people: Muneaki Masuda (CEO)
- Revenue: JPY 189,299 million (2010)
- Operating income: JPY 12,841 million (2010)
- Net income: JPY 9,424 million (2010)
- Total equity: JPY 124,229 million (2010)
- Owner: Muneaki Masuda (DBA MM Holdings KK)
- Subsidiaries: Esquire Magazine Japan; Tokuma Shoten; CCC Media House
- Website: www.ccc.co.jp

Culture Convenience Club Company, Limited (カルチュア・コンビニエンス・クラブ株式会社, Karuchua Konbiniensu Kurabu Kabushikigaisha) is a Japanese company that operates Tsutaya (蔦屋), a chain of video rental shops and bookstores in Japan, Taiwan, China and Thailand. The company is headquartered in Ebisu, Tokyo. The stock of the company was formerly listed in the first section of the Tokyo Stock Exchange (TYO: 4756), but it has since been delisted following a management buyout in 2011.

== History ==
As of December 2013, the company and its franchisees operate 1,461 Tsutaya rental shops in Japan.

The T Card, the membership card of Tsutaya, works as a platform for a cross-industry loyalty program. As of May 2010, more than 35 million holders of the card earn "T Points" at FamilyMart, Book Off, Lotteria, and so forth as well as Tsutaya shops.

On 17 March 2017, the company acquired magazine publishing brand Tokuma Shoten. The deal was expected to be completed at the end of March. In September 2017, the Culture Convenience Club signed a deal with China's CITIC Press Group to create a joint cultural content distribution platform.

== See also ==
- Tsutaya Books Daikanyama
