= Mayu Yoshioka =

Japanese voice actress (born 1995)

- 吉岡 茉祐
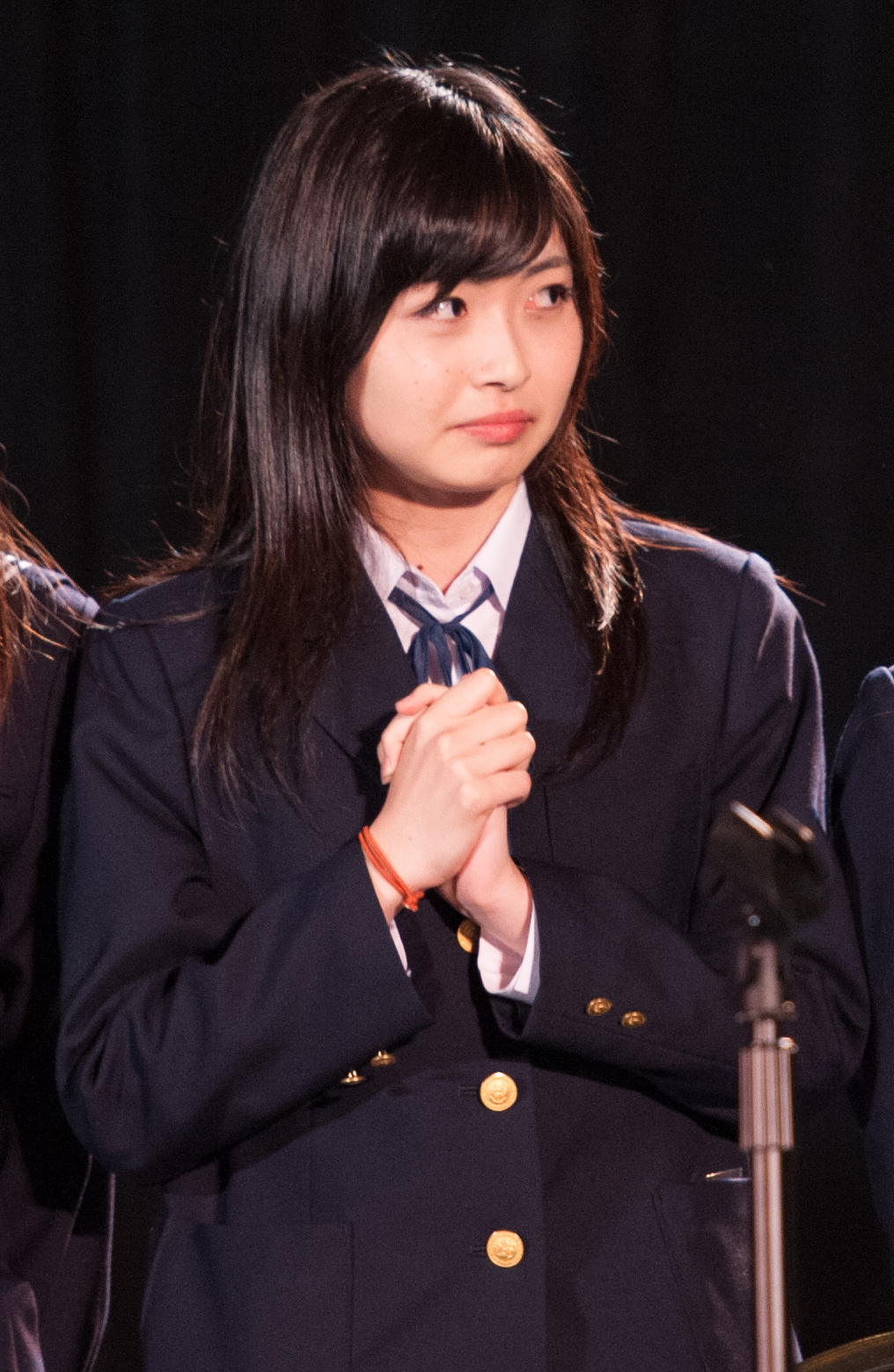
- Yoshioka at Anime Central 2014
- Born: November 7, 1995 (age 30); Osaka, Japan
- Other name: Mayushii
- Occupation: Voice actress
- Agent: 81 Produce

Mayu Yoshioka (吉岡 茉祐, Yoshioka Mayu; born November 7, 1995) is a Japanese voice actress best known for Wake Up, Girls!, where she played the central character. She is affiliated with 81 Produce.

== Career ==
Growing up in Osaka, Yoshioka studied stage acting in school. She became aware of Mamoru Miyano and was inspired by his work as both a stage actor and seiyuu. She passed an audition for Wake Up, Girls! in her second year of high school.

She and her fellow W.U.G. actresses won the Special Award at the 9th Annual Seiyu Awards.

== Select works ==
=== Television ===
2006

- Kyō no Go no Ni

2014

- Wake Up, Girls! - Mayu Shimada
- DRAMAtical Murder - Female announcer
- Hacka Doll the Animation - Ayame

2016

- Anne Happy - Ren "Len" Ekoda
- Hundred - Sakura Kirishima
- Taboo Tattoo - Schoolgirl D

2017

- Love Tyrant - Girl in a swimsuit, Lady, Seiji Aino (young), Track club member
- The Laughing Salesman NEW - Nozomu Shizuoka
- In Another World with My Smartphone - Aer
- 100% Pascal-sensei - Mayurin

2018

- Release the Spyce - Child, Female Customer, Pharmacy Employee
- Hinomaru Sumo - Girl, Young Sada

2019

- Kemono Friends 2 - California Sea Lion
- Fruits Basket - Schoolgirl
- Cop Craft - Tilarna Exedilica

2020

- Breakers - Kyoko
- Sakura Wars the Animation - Itsuki Saijo
- Ahiru no Sora - Basketball member

2021

- Kageki Shojo!! - Miki's mother, Yamagishi
- Kiyo in Kyoto

2022

- Puchiseka - Kiritani Haruka

2023

- Farming Life in Another World - Granmaria
- Dead Mount Death Play - Kayakusa
- World Dai Star - Audience D

2024

- High Card - Leo (young)

2025

- The Unaware Atelier Master - Bandana

=== Games ===
2013

- Wake Up, Girls! Stage no Tenshi

2014

- Tokyo 7th Sisters

2015

- Miracle Girls Festival

2016

- Gurumon
- Soul Reverse Zero

2018

- Grimms Notes Repage
- Onsen Musume Yunohana Collection

2019

- New Sakura Wars

2020

- Arknights as Utage
- Kirara Fantasia
- 22/7 Music Time
- Hatsune Miku: Colorful Stage! as Haruka Kiritani

2024

- Umamusume: Pretty Derby as Dream Journey
