= Hidekazu Tanaka =

Japanese composer (b. 1987)

Hidekazu Tanaka 田中秀和
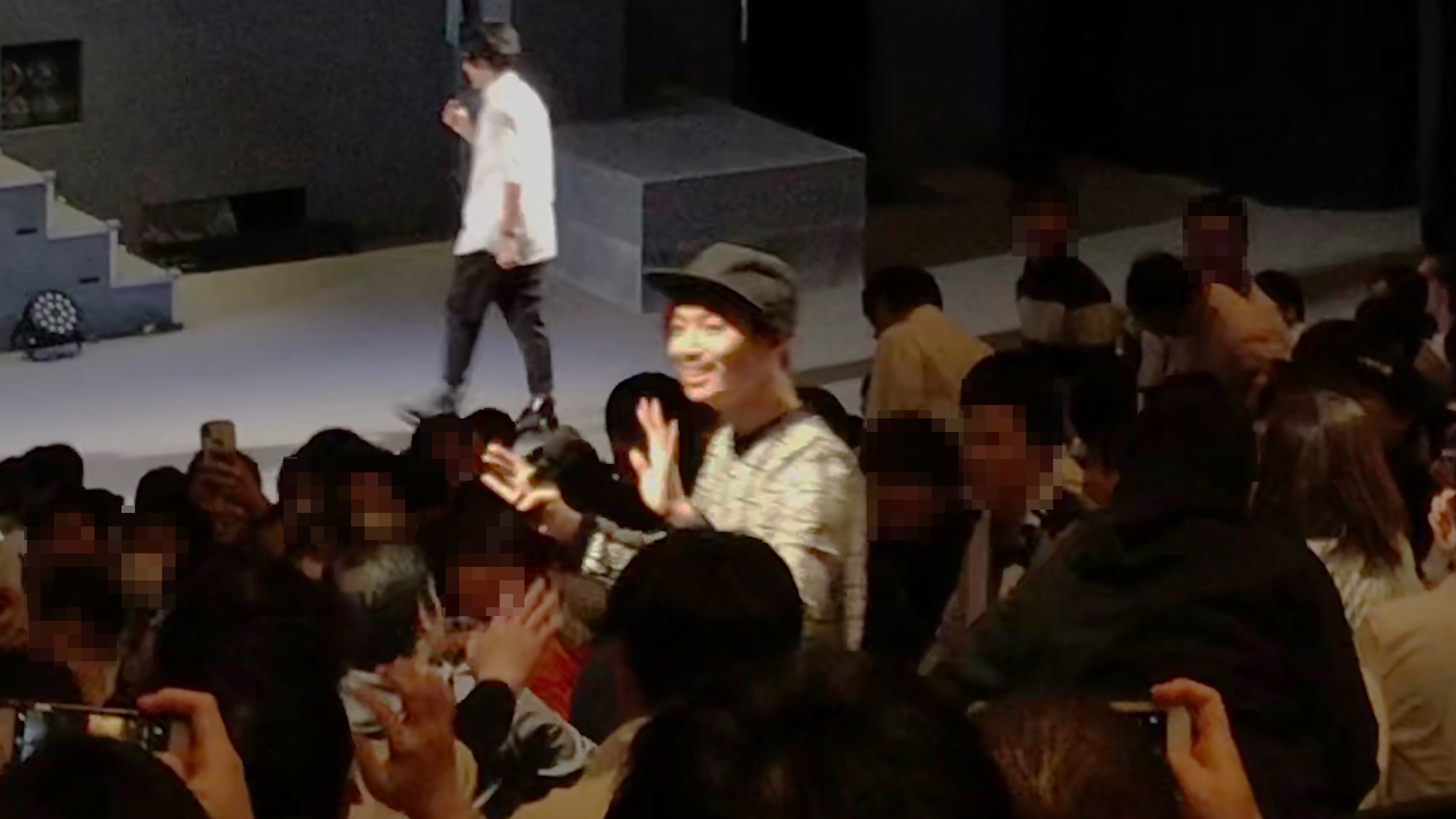
- Tanaka at Aikatsu! ANION DJ Live Picture Record "Calendar Girl" Launch Event, March 8, 2019.

Background information
- Born: June 4, 1987 (age 39); Osaka, Japan
- Origin: Japan
- Genres: J-pop; background music
- Occupations: Composer; arranger; producer
- Instruments: Keyboard; Acoustic guitar
- Years active: 2010–2022
- Label: MONACA (2010–2021)

Hidekazu Tanaka (田中 秀和, Tanaka Hidekazu; born June 4, 1987) is a Japanese composer and arranger best known for his work for anime and video games. He was affiliated with the music production company MONACA, but left in 2021 to be freelance.

== Biography ==
Tanaka was born in Osaka. He first became interested in music as a young child when he saw his older sisters playing piano. Soon after, he began taking piano lessons. He became dispassionate toward traditional lessons, however, and practiced with an electronic keyboard at home. While in junior high school, Tanaka learned to play acoustic guitar after being inspired by folk-rock duo Yuzu. As he learned how to play songs by Yuzu, he realized that he wanted to make his own music. Soon after, he began learning how to use MIDI software on his computer. His first experience was using Yamaha's Easy Composition Master software to convert melodies he hummed into MIDI.

Tanaka graduated from Kobe University in the Department of Human Development, where he studied musical composition under the guidance of Professor Yu Wakao. Shortly after graduating, Tanaka was recruited on Mixi by composer Satoru Kōsaki as an assistant at his production company MONACA. Tanaka officially joined the company in 2010. At first, he would often accompany Kōsaki to recording sessions and assist with music preparation and Pro Tools operation. Soon after, he would begin writing and producing his own music. As an employee of MONACA, he wrote theme songs and background music for many anime series including The Idolmaster, Nyaruko: Crawling with Love, Aikatsu! and Wake Up, Girls!. He has also written music for video games and for recording artists. On July 31, 2021, after 10 years with the company, he left MONACA and to work as a freelancer.

Tanaka is noted for frequently using a specific augmented sixth chord in his works.

On October 24, 2022, he was arrested on suspicion of sexual assault of a teenage girl in Meguro, Tokyo in August of that year. His name has been removed from various anime series, the sales for the 2nd opening theme to Uzaki-chan Wants to Hang Out! were halted, and the sales of the 4th version of the 1st opening theme to Pokémon Ultimate Journeys: The Series were halted as well. On March 15, 2023, Tanaka admitted to obscenity charges which included saying obscene language to a 15-year-old girl. In May, he was convicted by the Tokyo District Court of violating Tokyo's Trouble Prevention Ordinance and committing indecent acts and received a 18-month suspended sentence.

== Discography ==
=== Anime soundtracks ===
| Title | Year | Role(s) |
|---|---|---|
| Working!! | 2010 | Composer (other tracks by Keiichi Okabe, Kakeru Ishihama and Keigo Hoashi) |
| Nyaruko: Crawling with Love | 2012 | Composer (other tracks by Kakeru Ishihama, Keigo Hoashi and Ryuichi Takada) |
| Tantei Opera Milky Holmes Alternative One: Opera Kobayashi and the Five Paintings | 2012 | Composer (other tracks by Kakeru Ishihama, Keigo Hoashi and Satoru Inohara) |
| Tantei Opera Milky Holmes Alternative Two: Opera Kobayashi and the Raven of the Empty Sky | 2012 | Composer (other tracks by Kakeru Ishihama, Keigo Hoashi and Satoru Inohara) |
| Aikatsu! | 2012 | Composer (other tracks by Keiichi Okabe, Kakeru Ishihama, Keigo Hoashi, Ryuichi Takada and Kuniyuki Takahashi) |
| Nyaruko: Another Crawling Chaos W | 2013 | Composer |
| Servant × Service | 2013 | Composer (other tracks by Kakeru Ishihama, Keigo Hoashi, Keiichi Hirokawa, Kuniyuki Takahashi and Ryuichi Takada) |
| Wake Up, Girls! The Movie | 2014 | Composer (other tracks by Keiichi Hirokawa and Kuniyuki Takahashi) |
| Wake Up, Girls! | 2014 | Composer (other tracks by Keiichi Hirokawa and Kuniyuki Takahashi) |
| The Idolmaster Cinderella Girls | 2015 | Composer |
| Working!!! | 2015 | Composer (other tracks by Keiichi Okabe, Kakeru Ishihama, Keigo Hoashi, Keiichi Hirokawa and Kuniyuki Takahashi) |
| Anne Happy | 2016 | Composer (other tracks by Keiichi Okabe, Satoru Kōsaki, Kakeru Ishihama, Keigo Hoashi, Keiichi Hirokawa, Kuniyuki Takahashi and Shotaro Seo) |
| Scorching Ping Pong Girls | 2016 | Composer (other tracks by Kuniyuki Takahashi, Keiichi Hirokawa and Shotaro Seo) |
| Love Tyrant | 2017 | Composer (other tracks by Ryuichi Takada, Keiichi Hirokawa and Shotaro Seo) |
| Wake Up, Girls! New Chapter | 2017 | Composer (other tracks by Kuniyuki Takahashi, Keiichi Hirokawa and Shotaro Seo) |
| Death March to the Parallel World Rhapsody | 2018 | Composer (other tracks by Kuniyuki Takahashi, Keiichi Okabe and Shotaro Seo) |
| Hitori Bocchi no Marumaru Seikatsu | 2019 | Composer (other tracks by Ryuichi Takada) |

=== Video game soundtracks ===
| Title | Year | Role(s) |
|---|---|---|
| Tantei Opera Milky Holmes | 2010 | Composer (other tracks by Kakeru Ishihama and Keigo Hoashi) |
| Tantei Opera Milky Holmes 2 | 2012 | Composer (other tracks by Kakeru Ishihama and Keigo Hoashi) |
| Tekken Tag Tournament 2 | 2012 | Composer (other tracks by Keiichi Okabe, Keigo Hoashi, Kakeru Ishihama, Ryuichi Takada, Keiichi Hirokawa, Takao Nagatani, Akitaka Tohyama, Taku Inoue, Nobuyoshi Sano, Shinji Hosoe, Ayako Saso and Ryo Watanabe) |

=== Television drama soundtracks ===
| Title | Year | Role(s) |
|---|---|---|
| Money no Tenshi: Anata no Okane Torimodoshimasu! | 2016 | Composer (other tracks by Kuniyuki Takahashi, Keiichi Hirokawa and Shotaro Seo) |

=== Anime theme songs ===
| Anime | Song title | Year | Type | Role(s) |
|---|---|---|---|---|
| Highschool of the Dead | "Memories of days gone by" | 2010 | Ending theme (episode 5) | Composer, arranger and guitar |
| Ad Lib Anime Kenkyuujo | "Appare! Shunkan Sekkyokuzai" (あっぱれ! 瞬間積極剤) | 2011 | Opening theme | Composer and arranger |
| Nyaruko: Crawling with Love | "Taiyou Iwaku Moeyo Chaos" (太陽曰く燃えよカオス) | 2012 | Opening theme | Composer and arranger |
| Aikatsu! | "Calendar Girl" (カレンダーガール) | 2012 | Ending theme (episodes 1–25) | Composer and arranger |
| Vividred Operation | "Arifureta Shiawase" (ありふれたしあわせ) | 2013 | Ending theme (episode 5) | Composer and arranger (strings arranged by Keigo Hoashi) |
| Aikatsu! | "Original Star" (オリジナルスター☆彡) | 2013 | Ending theme (episodes 51–75) | Composer and arranger |
| Servant × Service | "May I Help You?" (めいあいへるぷゆー?) | 2013 | Opening theme | Composer and arranger |
| Oreimo 2 | "Kanjousen Loop" (感情線loop) | 2013 | Ending theme (episode 13) | Composer and arranger |
| Nyaruko: Another Crawling Chaos W | "Koi wa Chaos no Shimobenari" (恋は渾沌の隷也) | 2013 | Opening theme | Composer and arranger |
| Koimonogatari | "snowdrop" | 2013 | Ending theme | Composer and arranger |
| Aikatsu! | "Good morning my dream" | 2014 | Ending theme (episodes 102–124) | Composer and arranger |
| Wake Up, Girls! | "7 Girls War" | 2014 | Opening theme | Composer and arranger (co-composed by Satoru Kōsaki) |
| Hanayamata | "Hana wa Odore ya Irohaniho" (花ハ踊レヤいろはにほ) | 2014 | Opening theme | Composer and arranger |
| Wake Up, Girls! Beyond the Bottom | "Beyond the Bottom" | 2015 | Ending theme | Composer and arranger |
| The Idolmaster Cinderella Girls | "Star!!" | 2015 | Opening theme | Composer and arranger |
| Nyaruko: Another Crawling Chaos F | "Haiyore Once Nyagain!" (這いよれOnce Nyagain!) | 2015 | Opening theme | Composer and arranger |
| Scorching Ping Pong Girls | "Shakunetsu Switch" (灼熱スイッチ) | 2016 | Opening theme | Composer and arranger |
| Anne Happy | "PUNCH☆MIND☆HAPPINESS" | 2016 | Opening theme | Composer and arranger |
| Is It Wrong to Try to Pick Up Girls in a Dungeon?: Sword Oratoria | "day by day" | 2017 | Ending theme | Composer and arranger |
| MSonic! D'Artagnyan's Rise to Fame | "Zenryoku Idol Sengen♡" (全力アイドル宣言♡) | 2017 | Ending theme | Composer and arranger |
| Love Tyrant | "Koi? De Ai? De Boukun Desu!" (恋?で愛?で暴君です!) | 2017 | Opening theme | Composer and arranger |
| Anime-Gataris | "Good Luck Lilac" (グッドラック ライラック) | 2017 | Ending theme | Composer and arranger |
| Wake Up, Girls! New Chapter | "7 Senses" | 2017 | Opening theme | Composer and arranger |
| Death March to the Parallel World Rhapsody | "Suki no Skill" (スキノスキル) | 2018 | Ending theme | Composer and arranger |
| The Idolmaster Cinderella Girls Theater | "Itoshiisaa♥" (いとしーさー♥) | 2018 | Ending theme (episodes 2–5) | Composer and arranger |
| Aikatsu on Parade! | "Idol Katsudou! On Parade! ver." (アイドル活動! オンパレード! ver.) | 2019 | Ending theme | Composer |
| High School Prodigies Have It Easy Even In Another World | "Hajimete no Kakumei!" (はじめてのかくめい！) | 2019 | Opening theme | Arranger, sound director and programmer |
| Assassins Pride | "Share the Light" | 2019 | Opening theme | Composer, arranger and programmer |
| Pokémon Journeys | "1, 2, 3" | 2020 | Opening theme (episodes 32-49) | Arranger (co-arranged by mafumafu) |
| Bottom-tier Character Tomozaki | "Jinsei Easy?" (人生イージー?) | 2020 | Opening theme | Arranger |
| LBX Girls | "Compass Song" (コンパスソング) | 2020 | Ending theme | Composer and arranger |
| Pokémon Ultimate Journeys | "1, 2, 3" | 2022 | Opening theme (episodes 100-129) | Arranger (co-arranged by mafumafu) |

=== Video game songs ===
| Game | Song title | Year | Type | Role(s) |
|---|---|---|---|---|
| The Idolmaster Cinderella Girls | "Susume☆Otome ~jewel parade~" (ススメ☆オトメ ～jewel parade～) | 2013 | Character song | Composer and arranger |
| Maimai | "Itazura" (悪戯) | 2015 | Insert song | Composer and arranger |
| Aikatsu! Photo on Stage!! | "Dramatic Girl" (ドラマチックガール) | 2016 | Insert song | Composer and arranger |
| Ensemble Stars! | "Hoppin' Season♪" | 2016 | Character song | Composer and arranger |
| Uma Musume Pretty Derby | "Silent Star" | 2016 | Character song | Composer and arranger |
| Aikatsu! Photo on Stage!! | "Aikatsu Melody!" (アイカツメロディ!) | 2017 | Insert song | Composer and arranger |
| The Idolmaster Cinderella Girls: Starlight Stage | "Slow Life Fantasy" (スローライフ・ファンタジー) | 2017 | Character song | Composer and arranger |
| The Idolmaster Cinderella Girls | "EVERMORE" | 2017 | 5th anniversary song | Composer and arranger (co-composed and co-arranged by Shunsuke Takizawa) |
| Girl Friend Beta | "Precious Memories" | 2018 | 5th anniversary song | Composer and arranger |
| The Idolmaster Cinderella Girls: Starlight Stage | "Illusionista!" (イリュージョニスタ!) | 2018 | 2nd anniversary song | Composer and arranger |
| The Idolmaster Cinderella Girls | "Sakura no Kaze" (桜の風) | 2018 | Character song | Composer and arranger |
| Re:Stage! Prism Step | "*Heart Confusion*" | 2018 | Character song | Composer and arranger |
| Tenkahyakken: Zan | "Toushin wo Yasashiku Tap♡ (刀身をやさしくタップ♡)" | 2019 | Character song | Composer and arranger |
| Ninja Box | "HimitsuKiTuber (ヒミツキチューバー)" | 2019 | Theme song | Composer and arranger |
| The Idolmaster Cinderella Girls: Starlight Stage | "Blessing" | 2019 | Character song | Composer and arranger |
| Tenkahyakken: Zan | "GO-MA-N-E-TSU" | 2019 | Character song | Composer and arranger |
| The Idolmaster Cinderella Girls: Starlight Stage | "Joker" | 2020 | Insert song | Composer and arranger |
| The Idolmaster Cinderella Girls: Starlight Stage | "Go Just Go!" | 2020 | 5th anniversary song | Composer |

=== Other songs ===
| Artist | Song title | Year | Role(s) |
|---|---|---|---|
| Marina Kawano | "FOCUS! FOCUS!" | 2011 | Composer and arranger (co-arranged by Satoru Kōsaki) |
| Marina Kawano | "a long long letter" | 2011 | Composer, arranger and whistle (co-arranged by Satoru Kōsaki) |
| Marina Kawano | "Do!! Do!! Let me Fun♪" | 2011 | Composer and arranger |
| Kato*Fuku | "WORLD IS CALLING" | 2012 | Composer and arranger |
| Sumire Uesaka | "Warera to Warera no Michi wo" (我らと我らの道を) | 2013 | Composer and arranger |
| YuiKaori | "LUCKY DUCKY!!" | 2014 | Composer and arranger |
| Mia Regina | "THAT'S A FACT!" ~Senri no Michi mo Ippo kara~" (THAT'S A FACT! ～千里の道も一歩から～) | 2016 | Composer and arranger |
| Reina Ueda | "Watashi*Dori" (ワタシ*ドリ) | 2016 | Composer and arranger |
| Mia Regina | "Ms.R kara no Shinchaku Mail" (Ms.Rからの新着メール) | 2017 | Composer and arranger |
| Kano | "Linaria Girl" | 2017 | Composer and arranger |
| Marina Kawano | "Toumawari Highway" (遠回りハイウェイ) | 2017 | Composer and arranger |
| Nanami Yamashita | "Nanatsu no Umi no Concert" (七つの海のコンサート) | 2018 | Composer and arranger |
| Azuma Lim | "Jinrui Mina Senpai!" (人類みなセンパイ!) | 2018 | Composer and arranger (co-composed and co-arranged by mafumafu) |
| Wake Up, Girls! | "Doyoubi no Flight" (土曜日のフライト) | 2019 | Composer and arranger |
| GEMS COMPANY | "JAM GEM JUMP!!!" | 2019 | Composer and arranger |
| May'n | "Summer Slider" (サマー・スライダー) | 2019 | Composer and arranger |
| Urashimasakatasen | "Mikansei Utopia" (未完成ユートピア) | 2019 | Composer and arranger |
| mafumafu | "Onnanoko ni Naritai" (女の子になりたい) | 2018 | Composer and arranger (co-composed by mafumafu) |
| Marina Kawano | "Suiren" (水恋) | 2019 | Composer and arranger |
| Kano | "CAFUNÉ" | 2019 | Composer |
| Reina Ueda | "Walk on your side" | 2020 | Composer and arranger |
| Http: from GEMS COMPANY | "Net no Kamisama" (ネットのかみさま) | 2020 | Composer and arranger |
| Band Ja Naimon! MAXX NAKAYOSHI | "GODSONG" (ゴッドソング) | 2020 | Composer and arranger |
| SoundOrion | "Familiar base" | 2020 | Arranger |
| Mia Regina | "Cidre" | 2020 | Composer and arranger |
| Omaru Polka | "Saikyouticpolka" (サイキョウチックポルカ) | 2022 | Composer and arranger |
| The World Standard | "Mash'd Art" (マッシュ・ド・アート) | 2022 | Composer |

=== Albums ===
| Artist | Album title | Year | Role(s) |
|---|---|---|---|
| Kano | yuanfen | 2020 | Producer, composer and arranger |
