= Kaya Okuno =

Japanese voice actress

- 奥野 香耶
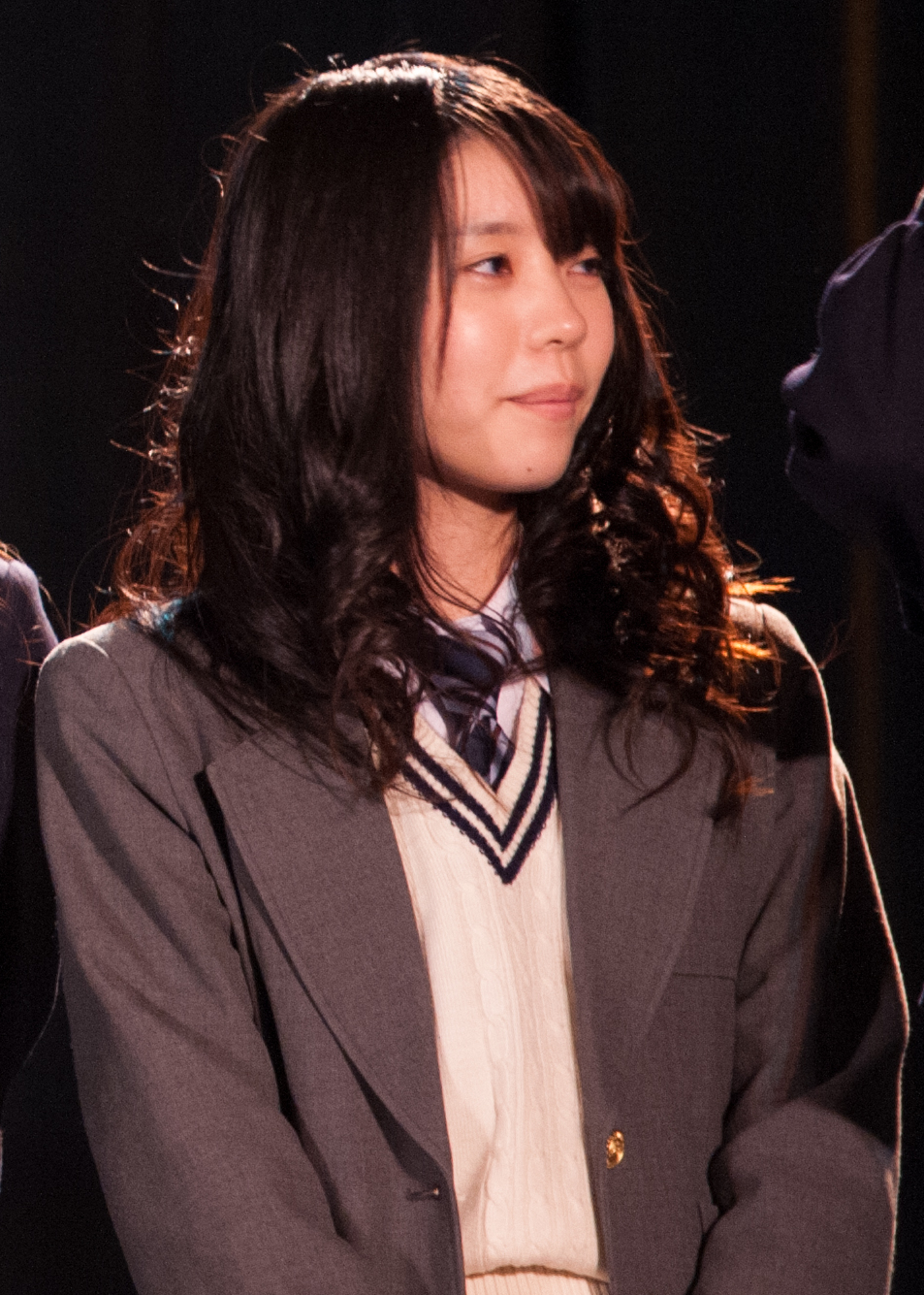
- Born: March 1, 1991 (age 35); Morioka, Iwate Prefecture, Japan
- Occupation: Voice actress
- Years active: 2014–present
- Height: 151 cm (4 ft 11 in)

Kaya Okuno (奥野 香耶, Okuno Kaya; born March 1, 1991) is a Japanese voice actress from Iwate Prefecture. She was previously affiliated with 81 Produce and is currently freelance.

== Career ==
When Okuno graduated from high school, she told her parents that she wanted to go to a voice-acting vocational school; however, her parents were against the idea, and she ended up enrolling in a four-year university affiliated to her high school.

She went on to pass the 2nd Anison Vocal Audition of Avex and 81 Produce's Wake Up, Girls! AUDITION held in September 2012. Since 2013, she has been active as a sub-leader of voice-acting unit Wake Up, Girls!.

In January 2014, she made her voice-acting debut as Kaya Kikuma in the anime series Wake Up, Girls!.

In 2015, she won the Special Award at the 9th Seiyu Awards on Wake Up, Girls!.

In 2018, she voiced the character of Unzen Inori, who won second place at the Onsen Musume Yunohana Collection 1st General Elections (in the group-unaffiliated division), and had the opportunity to make her debut as a solo artist.

On April 1, 2025, she announced through her personal X account that she had left 81 Produce on March 31 and would continue on working freelance.

== Personal life ==
Okuno was born in Morioka, Iwate. She has an older brother.

A fan of Sailor Moon since childhood, she would often channel Kotono Mitsuishi; she later watched Neon Genesis Evangelion, becoming enchanted with Mitsuishi's performance as Misato Katsuragi, and developed a fervent desire to meet Mitsuishi in person one day.

Okuno's favourite band is Mr. Children. She is a fan of the Hanshin Tigers and of the now-retired player Norihiro Akahoshi. She enjoys arts and crafts and playing with animals such as cats and dogs. Her special skills include playing the piano and speaking Tōhoku dialect.

== Filmography ==
=== Television Animation ===
- Dramatical Murder (2014), Female B (ep 5)
- Hanayamata (2014), Yaya Sasame
- Wake Up, Girls! (2014), Kaya Kikuma
- When Supernatural Battles Became Commonplace (2014), Middle Schooler
- Dance with Devils (2015), Schoolgirl A (eps 1-2, 5)
- Hacka Doll the Animation (2015), Hacka Doll #2
- Saekano: How to Raise a Boring Girlfriend (2015), Azusa Satomi
- Shomin Sample (2015), Maid (eps 3, 9); Misaki Yamada (ep 5); Ojōsama
- Hundred (2016), Karen Kisaragi
- Schwarzesmarken (2016), Operator A
- Death March to the Parallel World Rhapsody (2018), Tama
- So I'm a Spider, So What? (2021), Filimøs/Kanami Okazaki
- Girls' Frontline (2022), Scarecrow
- Sweet Reincarnation (2023), Petra Mill Hubarek
- Uma Musume Pretty Derby Season 3 (2023), Verxina

=== Original Net Animation (ONA) ===
- Wake Up, Girl ZOO! (2014), Kaya Kikuma

=== Theatrical Animation ===
- Wake Up, Girls! Seven Idols (2014), Kaya Kikuma
- Wake Up, Girls! Seishun no Kage (2015), Kaya Kikuma
- Wake Up, Girls! Beyond the Bottom (2015), Kaya Kikuma
- New Initial D Legend 3: Dream (2016), Sayuki

=== Video games ===
- Wake Up, Girls! Stage no Tenshi (2013), Kaya Kikuma
- Hacka Dokkan (2014), Hacka Doll #2
- Hanayamata Yosakoi Live! (2014), Yaya Sasame
- Granblue Fantasy (2015), Bridgette
- Miracle Girls Festival (2015), Kaya Kikuma
- Thousand Memories (2015), Hacka Doll #2
- Uchi no Hime-sama wa Ichiban Kawaii (2015), Komahime Chikorin Gambit
- Yome Collection (2015), Hacka Doll #2
- Drift Girls (2016), Marei Hinohara
- Girls' Frontline (2016), Dreamer, Scarecrow
- Kirara Fantasia (2017), Sasame Yaya
- The King of Fighters All Star (2020), Pretty Zero (Original), Pretty Zero (Clone)
- ALTDEUS: Beyond Chronos (2020), Coco Coconoe
- Umamusume: Pretty Derby (2023), Verxina

=== Software ===
- Synthesizer V (2022), Hanakuma Chifuyu

=== Dubbing ===
- The Final Girls, Mimi (Lauren Gros)
