= Airi Eino =

Japanese voice actress and singer

- 永野 愛理
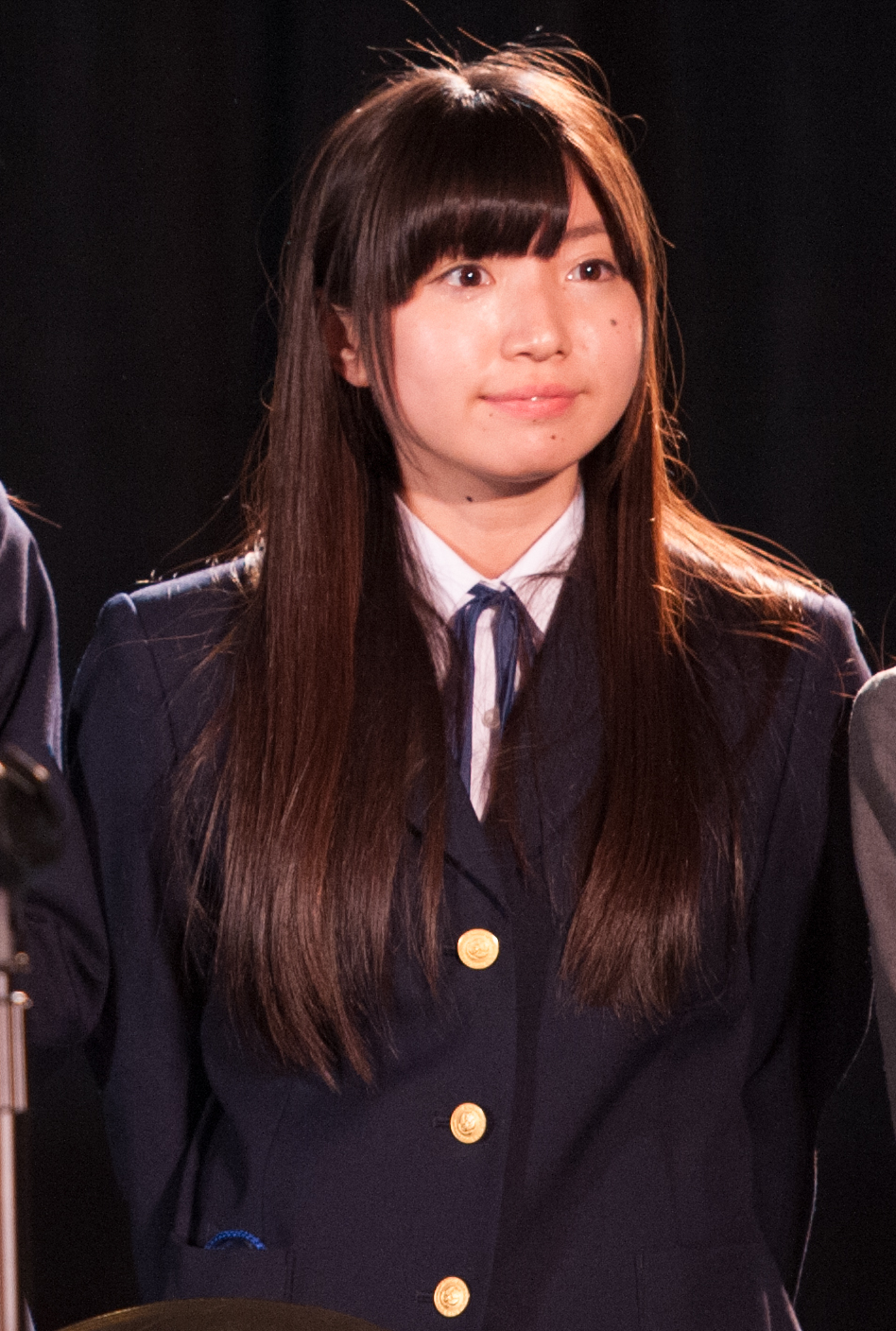
- Born: 19 January 1993 (age 33)
- Occupations: Voice actress; singer
- Years active: 2014–present
- Agent: 81 Produce
- Notable work: Wake Up, Girls! as Airi Hayashida; Death March to the Parallel World Rhapsody as Misanaria Bolenan; Tamayomi as Risa Fujiwara

Airi Eino (永野 愛理, Eino Airi; born 19 January 1993) is a Japanese voice actress and singer from Sendai, affiliated with 81 Produce. She is known for portraying Airi Hayashida in Wake Up, Girls!, Misanaria Bolenan in Death March to the Parallel World Rhapsody, and Risa Fujiwara in Tamayomi.

== Biography ==
Airi Eino, a native of Sendai, was born on 19 January 1993. She began studying dance in elementary school, she won a district tournament for her junior high school badminton club. Having heard of The Sickness unto Death in high school, she studied philosophy at Tohoku Gakuin University, and in March 2015, she graduated from their Department of Comprehensive Humanities' Faculty of Letters.

Despite being a fan of anime after seeing The Melancholy of Haruhi Suzumiya, she initially felt that it was impossible for her to become a voice actress. However, she saw a Nico Nico Douga call for auditions for the voice acting unit Wake Up, Girls! and considered it only after thinking that she should audition for her favorite anime. She was selected in the auditions, and on 29 July 2013, she was announced as one of Wake Up, Girls!' members. She later reprised her role in the anime. In December 2017, she was cast as Misanalia Boruenan in the baseball anime Death March to the Parallel World Rhapsody. In September 2019, she was cast as Risa Fujiwara in the baseball anime Tamayomi.

She choreographed two Wake Up, Girls! songs, Chikatetsu Labyrinth and Tunago, and she also was a choreographer for Hacka Doll THE Festival.

== Personal life ==
Despite remaining in Sendai after joining Wake Up, Girls!, she moved to Tokyo after graduating from Tohoku Gakuin University.

She is a fan of her native Sendai's Tohoku Rakuten Golden Eagles. On 6 August 2017, he threw out the ceremonial first pitch in the game between Rakuten and Lotte at Kobo Park Miyagi.

== Filmography ==
=== Anime television ===
2014

- Wake Up, Girls!, Airi Hayashida

2017

- Grimoire of Zero, Village woman
- Idol Time PriPara, Kanade
- Kakegurui, Female student
- Love Tyrant, Track and Field club member, etc.
- Restaurant to Another World, magician

2018

- Death March to the Parallel World Rhapsody, Misanaria Bolenan

2020

- Tamayomi, Risa Fujiwara

=== Animated film ===
2014

- Wake Up, Girls! – Seven Idols, Airi Hayashida

=== Video games ===
2017

- Cinderella Nine, Kanako Nagai
- Power Pros, Kokoro Hibikino

2018

- Wake Up, Girls! Stage no Tenshi, Airi Hayashida

2019

- Kemono Friends 3, America Rhea

2021

- Azur Lane, Maestrale, Libeccio
