= 9th Seiyu Awards =

Japanese voice acting awards ceremony in 2015

- Awarded for: Voice acting in Japan
- Date: March 7, 2015
- Location: JOQR Media Plus Hall; Minato, Tokyo
- Country: Japan

Highlights
- Best Lead Actor: Daisuke Ono
- Best Lead Actress: Sayaka Kanda
- Website: www.seiyuawards.jp

The 9th Seiyu Awards ceremony was held on March 7, 2015, at the JOQR Media Plus Hall in Minato, Tokyo.

Winners	Agency	Character	Anime
Best Actor in leading role
Daisuke Ono	Mausu Promotion	Cain; Shizuo Heiwajima; Sanada Nobuyuki	Kakumeiki Valvrave; Durarara!!×2 Shō; Sengoku Musou
Best Actress in leading role
Sayaka Kanda	Fantic	Nadeshiko Adenokouji	Good Luck Girl!
Best Actors in supporting roles
Katsuyuki Konishi	Ken Production	Ritsu Kisaragi	La Corda d'Oro Blue Sky
Toshiyuki Morikawa	Axl-One	Hijikata Toshizō	Bakumatsu Rock
Best Actresses in supporting roles
Miyuki Sawashiro	Mausu Promotion	Fujiko Mine	Lupin the 3rd vs. Detective Conan: The Movie
Kana Hanazawa	Office Osawa	Kosaki Onodera	Nisekoi
Best Rookie actors
Ryōta Ōsaka	Early Wing	Nagate Tanikaze	Knights of Sidonia
Sōma Saitō	81 Produce	Twelve	Zankyō no Terror
Natsuki Hanae	Across Entertainment	Inaho Kaizuka	Aldnoah.Zero
Best Rookie Actresses
Sora Amamiya	Music Ray'n	Akame	Akame ga Kill!
Reina Ueda	81 Produce	Naru Sekiya	Hanayamata
Aya Suzaki	I'm Enterprise	Tamako Kitashirakawa	Tamako Love Story
Best personalities
Winner	Agency	Radio Programs	Broadcasting Station
Daisuke Ono	Mausu Promotion	Dear Girl Stories	JOQR
Hiroshi Kamiya	Aoni Production	Dear Girl Stories	JOQR
Best Musical Performance
Winner		Record Label	
μ's		Lantis	
Winners		Agency	
Achievement Award
Hiroshi Ōtake		81 Produce	
Fuyumi Shiraishi		Ken Production	
Synergy Award
Yo-Kai Watch (Haruka Tomatsu, Tomokazu Seki)
Kei Tomiyama Memorial Award (Topical Award)
Akio Ōtsuka		Mausu Promotion	
Kids Family Award
Etsuko Kozakura		Little Portal	
Kazue Takahashi Memorial Award
Gara Takashima		Haikyō	
Most Votes Award
Hiroshi Kamiya		Aoni Production	
Special Award
Wake Up, Girls! (Mayu Yoshioka, Minami Tanaka, Yoshino Aoyama)
