= Megan Shipman =

American voice actress (born 1992)

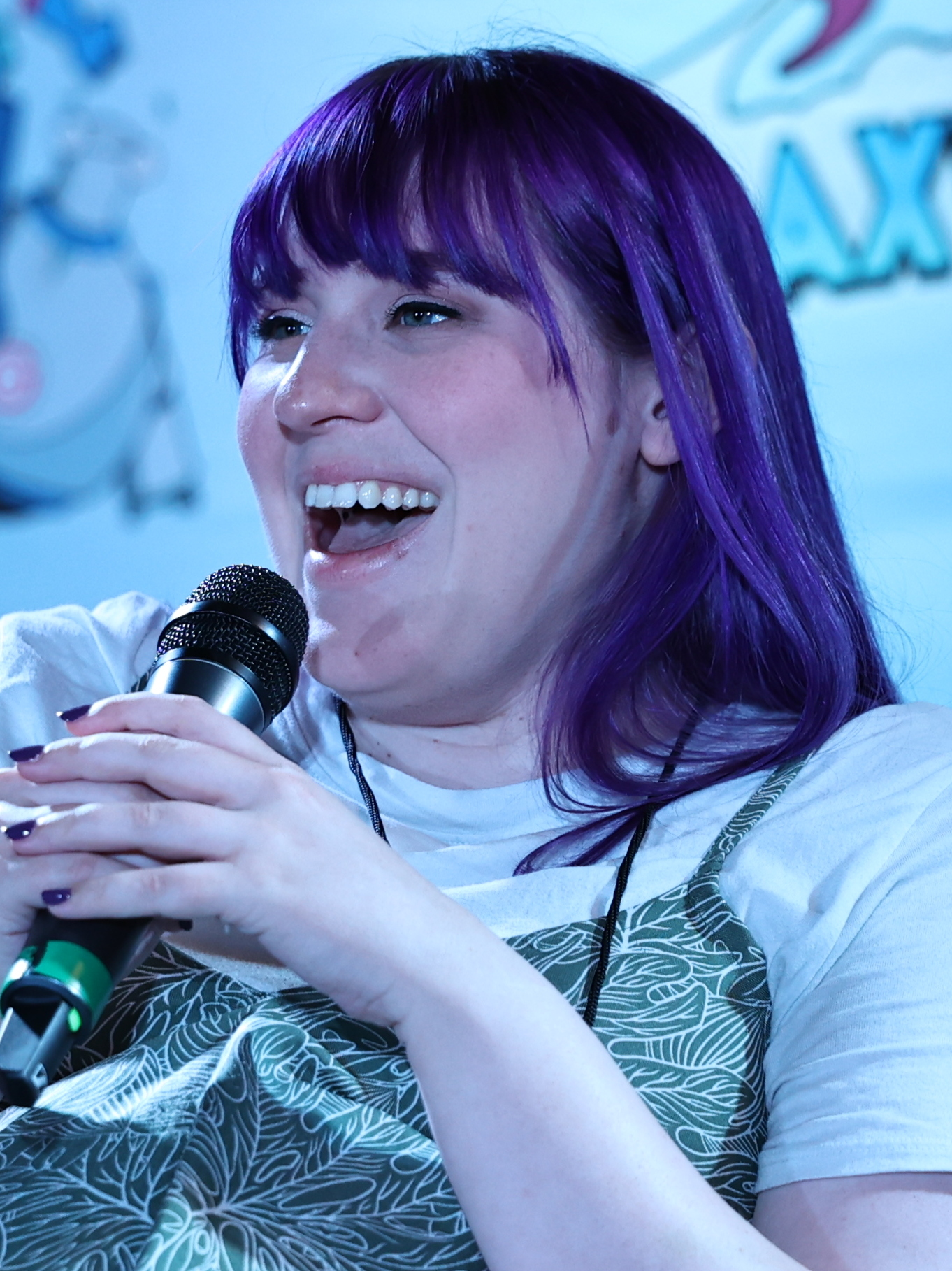
- Shipman in 2023
- Born: Megan Elizabeth Shipman; March 13, 1992 (age 34); Dallas, Texas, U.S.
- Education: Louisiana State University (BM)
- Occupations: Voice actress; ADR director; singer
- Years active: 2013–present
- Children: 1

Twitch information
- Channel: EiseiTsukimaru
- Years active: 2024–present
- Genres: Gaming; Just Chatting
- Followers: 5.2 thousand

YouTube information
- Channel: MopTop
- Subscribers: 16.9 thousand
- Views: 4.5 million
- Last updated: December 16, 2025
- Website: www.meganshipman.com

Megan Elizabeth Shipman (born March 13, 1992) is an American voice actress, ADR director and singer. She has provided vocal performances in English-language dubbing of Japanese anime. Some of her notable roles include Yuzu Aihara in Citrus, Aoba Suzukaze in New Game!, Grey in Black Clover, Hanamaru Kunikuda in Love Live! Sunshine!!, Maple in Bofuri, Sakura Adachi in Adachi and Shimamura, Komichi Akebi in Akebi's Sailor Uniform, La Brava in My Hero Academia, and Anya Forger in Spy × Family.

== Biography ==
Megan Elizabeth Shipman was born in Dallas, Texas, on March 13, 1992. She attended John Horn High School, graduating in 2010. She started doing voice-over in college and after attending an open audition for Funimation, she continued getting work and auditions. In 2014, she starred in her breakout role as Hibari in the English dub of the anime series Senran Kagura: Ninja Flash! In the same year, Shipman graduated with a bachelor's degree in music education from the College of Music & Dramatic Arts at Louisiana State University. After graduating, Shipman returned to Dallas and worked as a middle school choir teacher for three years. She later quit her job and pursued a voice acting career. Shipman has also worked as an ADR director for several anime series, including Show by Rock!! Mashumairesh!!, Scarlet Nexus, and Love Live! Nijigasaki High School Idol Club. Outside of voice acting, she has released cover versions of anime songs on her YouTube channel. She also livestreams as a VTuber under the name Eisei Tsukimaru.

Shipman is married. In June 2022, she revealed that she had a miscarriage. In October 2023, Shipman gave birth to her first child, a baby girl, and announced that she would be taking a temporary hiatus.

== Filmography ==
=== Animated series ===
List of voice performances in animated series
Year	Title	Role	Notes	Ref.
2014	A Certain Scientific Railgun S	Rikou Takitsubo		
2014	Senran Kagura: Ninja Flash!	Hibari		
2015	Freezing Vibration	Rattle		
2015	D-Frag!	Sakura Mizukami		
2015	Wanna Be the Strongest in the World!	Juri Sanada		
2015	Hyperdimension Neptunia	If		
2015	Show by Rock!!	Corriente		
2015	Sky Wizards Academy	Lecty Eisenach		
2015	One Piece	Camie, Sanji (young)		
2015	Shomin Sample	Mizuho Suehiro		
2015	Dragonar Academy	Lynette		
2015	Attack on Titan: Junior High	Moe Titan		
2016	Pandora in the Crimson Shell: Ghost Urn	Nene Nanakorobi		
2016	No-Rin	Kochou Yoshida		
2016	Snow White with the Red Hair	Eugena		
2016	Date A Live	Yuzuru Yamai	Seasons 2, 3 and 4	
2016	Kamisama Kiss	Kirihito's Mother	Season 2	
2016	Divine Gate	Bedivere		
2016	Dimension W	Cassidy		
2016	Seraph of the End	Akane		
2016	Love Live! Sunshine!!	Hanamaru Kunikida		
2016	The Disastrous Life of Saiki K.	Mera		
2016	Monster Hunter Stories: Ride On	Lin-Lin Kometa		
2016	Overlord	Mare Bello Fiore	4 seasons	
2016	Shimoneta	Tanukichi Okuma (young)		
2016	Castle Town Dandelion	Sowa		
2016	Alderamin on the Sky	Chamille		
2017	Garo: The Animation	Inari B		
2017	Masamune-kun's Revenge	Neko Fujinomiya	2 seasons	
2017	Chain Chronicle: The Light of Haecceitas	Juni		
2017	Luck & Logic	Chloe		
2017	Tsuki ga Kirei	Chinatsu		
2017	Tsugumomo	Chisato		
2017	Gosick	Ruri Kujo		
2017	Kantai Collection	Shimakaze		
2017	Valkyrie Drive: Mermaid	Mamori Tokonome	Credited as Kayla Hardwick	
2017	Hyouka	Konosu		
2017	New Game!	Aoba Suzukaze	2 seasons	
2017	Three Leaves, Three Colors	Nonoka Sekiguchi		
2017	Gamers!	Mika		
2017	Sakura Quest	Nagisa Koharu		
2017	18if	Sono		
2017	Black Clover	Rekka, Grey		
2017	Kino's Journey	Teacher		
2017	Code: Realize − Guardian of Rebirth	Etty		
2017	Orange	Tamae		
2017	King's Game The Animation	Yuuna		
2017	Anime-Gataris	Matsuri		
2017	Konohana Kitan	Tanabe		
2017	Hundred	Liza Harvey		
2018	Citrus	Yuzu Aihara		
2018	Darling in the Franxx	Naomi		
2018	Death March to the Parallel World Rhapsody	Nana		
2018	Junji Ito Collection	Mio		
2018	Keijo!!!!!!!!	Rei Mikawa		
2018	Touken Ranbu: Hanamaru	Houchou Toushirou		
2018	Kakuriyo: Bed & Breakfast for Spirits	Chibi	2 seasons	
2018	Dances with the Dragons	Jivenya Lorezzo		
2018	Cardcaptor Sakura: Clear Card	Nadeshiko Kinomoto		
2018	Katana Maidens: Toji No Miko	Ayumu		
2018	Magical Girl Raising Project	Snow White/Koyuki		
2018	Hanebado!	Kyoka Satomi		
2018	Steins;Gate 0	Mayuri Shiina	Replaced Ashly Burch	
2018	This Boy Is a Professional Wizard	Kouyama		
2018	That Time I Got Reincarnated as a Slime	Haruna	Seasons 1 and 3	
2018	Goblin Slayer	Sage		
2018	Conception	Mahiru		
2018	Fairy Tail	Rita		
2018	A Certain Magical Index III	Rikou Takitsubo		
2018	The Silver Guardian	Ritrette		
2019	Meiji Tokyo Renka	Shino		
2019	YU-NO: A Girl Who Chants Love at the Bound of this World	Mio		
2019	Afterlost	Yua		
2019	Isekai Quartet	Mare Bello Fiore		
2019	B't X Neo	Lily		
2019	Arifureta: From Commonplace to World's Strongest	Eri		
2019	The Ones Within	Murasaki		
2019	Nichijou	Tamamura		
2019	Astra Lost in Space	Aries Spring, Seira		
2019	Fruits Basket	Momo Soma		
2019	Kemono Friends	Gen		
2019	Dr. Stone	Homura Momiji		
2019	Azur Lane	Vestal, Minazuki		
2020	Bofuri: I Don't Want to Get Hurt, so I'll Max Out My Defense	Kaede Honjō/Maple	2 seasons	
2020	If My Favorite Pop Idol Made It to the Budokan, I Would Die	Eripiyo		
2020	Infinite Dendrogram	Liliana		
2020	Nekopara	Coconut (young)	Assistant ADR director	
2020	My Hero Academia	La Brava	Season 4	
2020	Asteroid in Love	Yuki Endou		
2020	Fire Force	Arthur Boyle (young)		
2020	Midnight Occult Civil Servants	Shiba		
2020	Super HxEros	Jikochuu		
2020	The Day I Became a God	Sora Narukami		
2020	Assault Lily Bouquet	Yujia Wang		
2021	Attack on Titan: The Final Season	Sasha Braus	Replaced Ashly Burch	
2021	Tamayomi	Yomi	Assistant ADR director	
2021	The Gymnastics Samurai	Kitty Zhang		
2021	Adachi and Shimamura	Sakura Adachi		
2021	Shachibato! President, It's Time for Battle!	Marika		
2021	Kuma Kuma Kuma Bear	Shia Foschurose		
2021	Dragon Goes House-Hunting	Dearia (young)		
2021	Wonder Egg Priority	Mako		
2021	Mushoku Tensei: Jobless Reincarnation	Vizquel		
2021	SSSS.Dynazenon	Chise		
2021	How Not to Summon a Demon Lord	Rose	Season 2	
2021	Kageki Shojo!!	Ayako Yamada		
2021	Hetalia: World Stars	Czech		
2021	The Detective Is Already Dead	Charlotte Arisaka Anderson	2 seasons	
2022	Akebi's Sailor Uniform	Komichi Akebi		
2022	Spy × Family	Anya Forger	3 seasons	
2022	Heroines Run the Show	Chizuru	Assistant ADR director	
2022	Life Lessons with Uramichi Oniisan	Pure Pink		
2022	Taisho Otome Fairy Tale	Kotori Shiratori		
2022	Moriarty the Patriot	Frida McCauley		
2022	The Slime Diaries: That Time I Got Reincarnated as a Slime	Haruna		
2022	Smile of the Arsnotoria the Animation	Little Alberta		
2022	Girlfriend, Girlfriend	Rika Hoshizaki/Milika	2 seasons	
2022	Lucifer and the Biscuit Hammer	Kuh Ritter		
2022	Zombie Land Saga Revenge	Makoto		
2023	Trigun Stampede	Knives (young)		
2023	Mobile Suit Gundam: The Witch from Mercury	Norea		
2023	My Tiny Senpai	Shiori		
2023	The Devil Is a Part-Timer!	Acieth Alla	Season 2	
2023	The Ancient Magus' Bride	Beatrice	Season 2	
2024	Natsume's Book of Friends	Taki	Season 4	
2024	Shangri-La Frontier	Setsuna Amatsuki		
2024	Frieren: Beyond Journey's End	Village of the Sword Chief		
2024	Solo Leveling	Kim Eunji		
2024	Tales of Wedding Rings	Nefritis	2 seasons	
2024	Chillin' in Another World with Level 2 Super Cheat Powers	Fenrys		
2024	Bye Bye, Earth	Belle Lablac	2 seasons	
2024	Why Does Nobody Remember Me in This World?	Jeanne		
2025	Medaka Kuroiwa Is Impervious to My Charms	Mona		
2025	Detective Conan	Ran Mori	2025 English dub	
2025	Lord of Mysteries	Melissa		
2025	My Dress-Up Darling	Arisa Izayoi	Season 2	
2025	To Be Hero X	Nice (child)		
2025	Toilet-Bound Hanako-kun	Sumire Akane	Season 2	
2025	Let This Grieving Soul Retire!	Lucia		
2026	Kaiju Girl Caramelise	Manatsu Tomosato		
2026	Chainsmoker Cat	Shizue Sato		

=== Films ===
List of voice performances in films
Year	Title	Role	Notes	Ref.
2015	A Certain Magical Index: The Movie – The Miracle of Endymion	Arisa Meigo		
2018	Hells	Steela		
2020	Love Live! Sunshine!! The School Idol Movie: Over the Rainbow	Hanamaru Kunikida	Assistant ADR director	
2020	City Hunter: Shinjuku Private Eyes	Ai Kisugi		
2021	Mobile Suit Gundam Hathaway	Gigi Andalucia		
2022	Sing a Bit of Harmony	Shion		
2022	Josee, the Tiger and the Fish	Kana		
2022	Knights of Sidonia: Love Woven in the Stars	Hashine		
2022	One Piece Film: Red	Romy		
2023	Black Clover: Sword of the Wizard King	Grey		
2024	Spy × Family Code: White	Anya Forger		
2025	The Rose of Versailles	Marie Antoinette		
2026	Mobile Suit Gundam Hathaway: The Sorcery of Nymph Circe	Gigi Andalucia		
2026	Detective Conan: The Million-dollar Pentagram	Ran Mori		

=== Video games ===
List of voice performances in video games
Year	Title	Role	Notes	Ref.
2019	Love Esquire	Amelie Boden		
2019	Crush Crush	Catara		
2020	My Hero One's Justice 2	La Brava		
2020	Ethereal Enigma	Kira Igarashi		
2020	Fire Emblem Heroes	Reginn		
2021	Smite	Valiant Huntress Artemis, Azula		
2021	Tales of Luminaria	Ana-Maria Marschner		
2023	Goddess of Victory: Nikke	Dorothy		
2023	Honkai: Star Rail	Messenger, Huohuo	Replaced Courtney Lin as Huohuo	
2024	Zenless Zone Zero	Grace Howard, Anya, Rain	Replaced Chelsea Kwoka as Grace Howard in version 1.7	
2024	Punishing: Gray Raven	Ishmael		
2026	My Hero Academia: All's Justice	La Brava		

== Awards and nominations ==
Awards and nominations received by Megan Shipman
Year	Award	Category	Nominated work	Result	Ref.
2015	3rd Behind the Voice Actors Awards	Breakthrough Voice Actress of the Year	—N/a	Nominated	
2016	4th Behind the Voice Actors Awards	Best Female Lead Vocal Performance in an Anime Movie/Special	A Certain Magical Index: The Movie – The Miracle of Endymion	Nominated	
