= Tamayomi =

Japanese manga series and its adaptations

- Cover of Tamayomi volume 1 by Houbunsha featuring Yomi Takeda

球詠
- Genre: Sports (Baseball)
- Manga
- Written by: Mountain Pukuichi
- Published by: Houbunsha
- Magazine: Manga Time Kirara Forward
- Original run: April 23, 2016 – present
- Volumes: 20
- Anime television series
- Directed by: Toshinori Fukushima
- Produced by: Kouki Higurashi; Masahiro Suenaga; Yoshito Hayano; Akihiro Matsumoto; Toshikatsu Saitou; Genta Ozaki; Kazunari Yasui; Shouta Watase; Kazusa Umeda; Atsushi Aitani
- Written by: Touko Machida
- Music by: Visual Arts
- Studio: Studio A-Cat
- Licensed by: Crunchyroll (Note: In North America via Crunchyroll (Funimation) and Australia via Madman Anime.)
- Original network: AT-X, ABC, Nagoya TV, Tokyo MX, KBC
- English network: US: Crunchyroll Channel
- Original run: April 1, 2020 – June 17, 2020
- Episodes: 12

Tamayomi (球詠; transl. "Baseball poem recitation") is a Japanese baseball manga series by Mountain Pukuichi, serialized in Houbunsha's seinen manga magazine Manga Time Kirara Forward since April 2016. It has been collected in twenty tankōbon volumes. An anime television series adaptation by Studio A-Cat aired from April to June 2020.

== Synopsis ==
Yomi Takeda just wanted to enjoy high school after her baseball experience went horribly wrong in her previous school, thanks to her special pitch. But by chance, twins Yoshino and Ibuki along with Yomi's childhood friend Tamaki, who is now a baseball catcher, decide to restore their high school, Shin Koshigaya's reputation after the scandal which causes the baseball club to be on hiatus. Joining them is two fielders in years one, a former kendo player, a power hitter, a baseball advisor and two second years that already signed in to keep the club from being disbanded. They all have one thing in common: to make it to the Nationals Baseball competition.

== Characters ==
Yomi Takeda (武田 詠深, Takeda Yomi)
Voiced by: Kaori Maeda (Japanese); Megan Shipman (English)
Tamaki Yamazaki (山崎 珠姫, Yamazaki Tamaki)
Voiced by: Satomi Amano (Japanese); Kristen McGuire (English)
Yoshino Kawaguchi (川口 芳乃, Kawaguchi Yoshino)
Voiced by: Nao Shiraki (Japanese); AmaLee (English)
Ibuki Kawaguchi (川口 息吹, Kawaguchi Ibuki)
Voiced by: Miyu Tomita (Japanese); AmaLee (English)
Ryō Kawasaki (川﨑 稜, Kawasaki Ryō)
Voiced by: Rina Kitagawa (Japanese); Macy Anne Johnson (English)
Sumire Fujita (藤田 菫, Fujita Sumire)
Voiced by: Marie Hashimoto (Japanese); Sarah Roach (English)
Rei Okada (岡田 怜, Okada Rei)
Voiced by: Yume Miyamoto (Japanese); Julie Shields (English)
Risa Fujiwara (藤原 理沙, Fujiwara Risa)
Voiced by: Airi Eino (Japanese); Kristi Rothrock (English)
Shiragiku Ōmura (大村 白菊, Ōmura Shiragiku)
Voiced by: Rina Honnizumi (Japanese); Dawn M. Bennett (English)
Nozomi Nakamura (中村 希, Nakamura Nozomi)
Voiced by: Ruriko Noguchi (Japanese); Emily Neves (English)
Kyōka Fujii (藤井 杏夏, Fujii Kyōka)
Voiced by: Haruka Yoshimura (Japanese); Katelyn Barr (English)

== Media ==
=== Manga ===
No.	Release date	ISBN
1	November 11, 2016	978-4-8322-4767-3
2	June 12, 2017	978-4-8322-4844-1
3	January 11, 2018	978-4-8322-4908-0
4	July 12, 2018	978-4-8322-4960-8
5	March 12, 2019	978-4-8322-7075-6
6	September 12, 2019	978-4-8322-7117-3
7	April 10, 2020	978-4-8322-7184-5
8	June 12, 2020	978-4-8322-7196-8
9	March 12, 2021	978-4-8322-7258-3
10	September 9, 2021	978-4-8322-7303-0
11	March 10, 2022	978-4-8322-7353-5
12	October 12, 2022	978-4-8322-7406-8
13	April 12, 2023	978-4-8322-7454-9
14	October 12, 2023	978-4-8322-7490-7
15	April 11, 2024	978-4-8322-9539-1
16	October 10, 2024	978-4-8322-9576-6
17	April 12, 2025	978-4-8322-9630-5
18	October 10, 2025	978-4-8322-9669-5
19	April 10, 2026	978-4-8322-9712-8
20	October 9, 2026	978-4-8322-9669-5

=== Anime ===
An anime television series adaptation of Tamayomi was announced in the August issue of Manga Time Kirara Forward on June 24, 2019. The series was animated by Studio A-Cat and directed by Toshinori Fukushima, with Touko Machida handling series composition, Kōichi Kikuta designing the characters, Masahiko Matsuo designing the props and Visual Arts composing the music. It aired from April 1 to June 17, 2020, on AT-X, ABC, Nayoga TV, Tokyo MX, and KBC. The opening theme is "Never Let You Go" performed by Naho, while the ending theme is "Plus Minus Zero Rule" (プラスマイナスゼロの法則, Plus Minus Zero no Hōsoku) performed by the cast of the Shin Koshigaya baseball team. Funimation, now known as Crunchyroll, has licensed the series for an English simulcast with an English dub and became available on its namesake streaming service from August 2022.

No.	Title (Note: All English titles are taken from Funimation.)	Directed by	Written by	Original release date
1	"A Fated Reunion"; Transliteration: "Unmei no saikai" (Japanese: 運命の再会)	Takahiro Tamano	Touko Machida	April 1, 2020
2	"Let's Play Ball Together"; Transliteration: "Issho ni yakyū yarimashō" (Japanese: 一緒に野球やりましょう)	Shigeki Awai	Touko Machida	April 8, 2020
3	"Take Me With You"; Transliteration: "Watashi otsureteitte yo" (Japanese: 私を連れていってよ)	Shunsuke Ishikawa	Touko Machida	April 15, 2020
4	"Pitch of Promise"; Transliteration: "Yakusoku no ano tama" (Japanese: 約束のあの球)	Yeong Ga-bu	Mitsuyo Suenaga	April 22, 2020
5	"Losing Streak"; Transliteration: "Susume!! Doronuma renpai kaidō" (Japanese: ススメ!!泥沼連敗街道)	Takashi Kobayashi	Chabō Higurashi	April 29, 2020
6	"With Hearts Full of Hope"; Transliteration: "Kibō o mune ni……" (Japanese: 希望を胸に……)	Alan Smithee	Mitsuyo Suenaga	May 6, 2020
7	"Night Sky After Rain"; Transliteration: "Ameagari no yozora ni" (Japanese: 雨上がりの夜空に)	Kinsei Nakamura	Chabō Higurashi	May 13, 2020
8	"From Zero"; Transliteration: "Zero kara" (Japanese: ゼロから)	Shigeki Awai	Mitsuyo Suenaga	May 20, 2020
9	"Change the Tide"; Transliteration: "Nagare no tsukurikata" (Japanese: 流れの作り方)	Shunsuke Ishikawa	Chabō Higurashi	May 27, 2020
10	"Show 'Em What We've Got"; Transliteration: "Misetsukete yarō" (Japanese: 見せつけてやろう)	Takashi Kobayashi	Touko Machida	June 3, 2020
11	"This is Nationals Level"; Transliteration: "Kore ga zenkoku reberu" (Japanese: これが全国レベル)	Alan Smithee	Touko Machida	June 10, 2020
12	"Pitch without Regret"; Transliteration: "Kuinaku nageyō" (Japanese: 悔いなく投げよう)	Toshinori Fukushima	Touko Machida	June 17, 2020

=== Video games ===
Characters from the series appeared in collaboration with Akatsuki's mobile baseball game Cinderella Nine in 2020. Also, characters from the series appear alongside other Manga Time Kirara characters in the mobile RPG, Kirara Fantasia in 2020.

=== Stage ===
It was adapted into a stage performance for a week in June 2021. At Shinjukumura Theater LIVE, ten performances were scheduled beginning February 17, 2022.
