= Hundred (novel series) =

Japanese light novel series

- Hundred light novel volume 1 cover featuring Emilia Hermit

ハンドレッド (Handoreddo)
- Genre: Action, comedy, science fiction
- Light novel
- Written by: Jun Misaki
- Illustrated by: Nekosuke Ōkuma
- Published by: SB Creative
- Imprint: GA Bunko
- Original run: November 15, 2012 – October 15, 2018
- Volumes: 16
- Manga
- Written by: Jun Misaki
- Illustrated by: Sasayuki
- Published by: Fujimi Shobo
- Magazine: Monthly Dragon Age
- Original run: December 2013 – January 2015
- Volumes: 2
- Anime television series
- Directed by: Tomoki Kobayashi
- Written by: Hideki Shirane
- Music by: Shuhei Naruse
- Studio: Production IMS
- Licensed by: NA: Crunchyroll
- Original network: TV Tokyo; AT-X; BS Japan
- Original run: April 5, 2016 – June 20, 2016
- Episodes: 12
- icon

Hundred (ハンドレッド, Handoreddo) is a Japanese light novel series written by Jun Misaki and illustrated by Nekosuke Ōkuma. SB Creative published 16 novels between November 15, 2012, and October 15, 2018, under their GA Bunko imprint. A manga adaptation with art by Sasayuki was serialized in Fujimi Shobo's Monthly Dragon Age magazine. An anime television series adaptation, produced by Production IMS and directed by Tomoki Kobayashi, aired from April to June 2016.

== Plot ==
"Hundreds" are a kind of weapon that get their name from their ability to change into many different forms, and are the only thing that can counter the mysterious life forms called Savage that are attacking Earth. Those who can wield a Hundred are sought out to be made into Slayers, trained individuals who can use them in combat. To become a Slayer, Hayato Kisaragi successfully enrolls in the marine academy city ship Little Garden. However he feels a strange yet familiar sense of incongruity towards Emile Crossford, his roommate who somehow knows him from somewhere. On top of that, shortly after he enters the school, he ends up getting challenged to a duel by the "Queen" and the school's most powerful Slayer, Claire Harvey.

== Characters ==
Hayato Kisaragi (如月 ハヤト, Kisaragi Hayato)
Voiced by: Yoshiaki Hasegawa (Japanese); Ricco Fajardo (English)
Hayato is the male protagonist of Hundred. Originally from Yamato, Hayato became a Slayer in order to obtain state-of-the-art medical treatment for his sister. His previous encounter with a Savage 10 years ago resulted in him becoming a Variant - one of a very small fraction of people (fewer than 10 in the world, according to Emile) who have survived exposure to the Savages and obtained a greatly increased affinity for Hundreds as a result. He has the highest known compatibility with a Hundred and his Hundred, the Flying Swallow, is a chevalier-type that takes the form of a sword and a shoulder guard. When he first met Emilia he didn't realize that she was really a girl, but upon discovering the truth, he agreed to keep her secret. He is shown to be slightly uncomfortable whenever Emilia was showing him affection and would always blush when around her or other women who show their romantic feelings toward him.
Emilia Hermit (エミリア・ハーミット, Emiria Hāmitto)
Voiced by: Rumi Ōkubo (Japanese); Mikaela Krantz (English)
Emilia is the female protagonist of Hundred. She is a silver-haired girl from the Britannia Empire and Hayato's roommate. She initially poses as a boy under the name Emile Crossfode (エミール・クロスフォード, Emīru Kurosufōdo) with only a few people aware of her secret until she eventually reveals the truth about herself. She and Hayato were survivors from the second Savage attack 10 years earlier, which resulted in her and Hayato becoming Variants. Hayato only has vague recollections of the prior event and it isn't until their encounter with the Savages at Zwei Island that Hayato realizes her true identity. She is a citizen of the Gudenburg Empire by birth and eventually reveals that she is Emilia Gudenburg (エミリア・グーデンブルグ, Emiria Gūdenburugu), the Empire's third princess. Her Hundred is the Arms Shroud that is an innocence type able to change into any form of weapon, something no other Slayer's Hundred can do. Like Hayato, she too is a Variant. Ten years ago she and Hayato where fleeing from the Savages' onslaught when she was attacked by one and almost died. The attack left a potent amount of virus in her gaping wound. Hayato, in an attempt to save her life sucked some of the fluids out, causing him to become a Variant as well. A substantial amount was still left in her system. She is in love with Hayato and is known to be very affectionate towards him and does not care about the rumors circulating about their relationship since everyone assumes them to be gay. Eventually, her status as a princess and girl are revealed to her peers, who were shocked at her heritage and finally understand her feelings to Hayato.
Claire Harvey (クレア・ハーヴェイ, Kurea Hāvei)
Voiced by: M.A.O (Japanese); Caitlin Glass (English)
The highest-ranked Slayer in Little Garden who is from the United States of Liberia, she is called the Queen. The newly-arrived Hayato is forced to duel her to prevent the expulsion of two students who arrived late to the entrance ceremony because they are looking for him at the airport when he arrived. During the duel Hayato accidentally gropes her and she goes all out and defeats him, but the duel is called a draw and the students are allowed to stay. After Hayato saves her from a Savage and, later, accidentally kisses her, she falls in love with him. Her Hundred is a Dragoon Type which utilizes multiple cannons or transforms into a large powerful rifle, in doing so it drains much of her energy. She is also one of the few people who are aware that Emilia is secretly a girl.
Karen Kisaragi (如月 カレン, Kisaragi Karen)
Voiced by: Kaya Okuno (Japanese); Dawn M. Bennett (English)
Hayato's younger sister who is ill. Hayato became a Slayer in order to obtain first-class treatment for her. While staying in the hospital she is often seen playing tarot cards, where she has become sort of a clairvoyant. Unlike her brother, Hayato, she suspected that Emilia was really a girl the moment she met her, until she was later convinced otherwise. She later becomes good friends with popular idol Sakura.
Sakura Kirishima (霧島 サクラ, Kirishima Sakura)
Voiced by: Mayu Yoshioka (Japanese); Amber Lee Connors (English)
She is a popular idol who falls in love with Hayato after seeing him defeat the Trenta Savage at Zwei Island. She originally met Hayato and Karen at a shelter in Gudenberg during the second Savage attack. She remembers Karen but wasn't able to get Hayato's name at the time. After that incident, she lives with her father whom she never meets. When she later falls ill from an unknown illness, her father sells her to the Warslran Research Facility, where subjects like her are injected with vaccines that are developed from the fluids recovered from defeated Savages. She is the only one of the test subjects to have survived and, like Hayato and Emilia, she is also a Variant and a Slayer.
Liza Harvey (リザ・ハーヴェイ, Riza Hāvei)
Voiced by: Nichika Ōmori (Japanese); Megan Shipman (English)
Claire's younger sister.
Liddy Steinberg (リディ・スタインバーグ, Ridi Sutainbāgu)
Voiced by: Rika Kinugawa (Japanese); Alex Moore (English)
Little Garden's student council Vice President who is in charge of enforcement, she is very loyal to Claire and can be very uptight when enforcing the school's rules and regulations. Her Hundred takes the form of a lance and a shield.
Erica Candle (エリカ・キャンドル, Erika Kyandoru)
Voiced by: Yui Makino (Japanese); Natalie Hoover (English)
She is also student council Vice President, however, she is mostly in charge of strategic planning, she has a high admiration for Claire, and it is suggested that she has certain feelings for her. Her Hundred, the Everlasting, is an Arsene type, which takes the form of a massive chained yoyo that she uses for restraining. Unfortunately her Hundred is ineffective against much stronger Savages. She is also one of the few people who became aware of Emilia's secret.
Fritz Granz (フリッツ・グランツ, Furittsu Gurantsu)
Voiced by: Wataru Hatano (Japanese); Jason Liebrecht (English)
Hayato's classmate and Latia's partner. His Hundred takes the form of a sniper rifle. He and Latia were childhood friends, he often pokes fun at her. He is curious about the relationship between Hayato and Emilie and often teases them about their relationship, including sometimes referring to them as a couple on occasion.
Latia Saintemilion (レイティア・サンテミリオン, Reitia Santemirion)
Voiced by: Yuka Ōtsubo (Japanese); Elizabeth Maxwell (English)
She is classmates with Hayato and Emilia, she is also Fritz's partner. Her Hundred is a close quarter melee type. She is Fritz's childhood friend.
Charlotte Dimandias (シャーロット・ディマンディウス, Shārotto Dimandiusu)
Voiced by: Miyu Matsuki (1st drama CD), Yui Horie (2nd drama CD, anime); Sarah Wiedenheft (English)
She is a child prodigy who serves as the Little Garden's only main technical expert and chief researcher on Hundreds. Her authority is equal to that of the student council, that she can go against them or question their decisions. She is best friends with Emilia, and she is one of the characters who knows her secret.
Meimei (メイメイ, Meimei)
Voiced by: Ayaka Imamura (Japanese); Jill Harris (English)
Miharu Kashiwagi (柏木 ミハル, Kashiwagi Miharu)
Voiced by: Yuna Yoshino (Japanese); Rachel Glass (English)
Miharu is a nurse at the hospital where Karen is staying. She is known for her very sweet demeanor and large breasts.
Chris Steinbelt (クリス・シュタインベルト, Kurisu Shutainberuto)
Voiced by: Emiri Kato (Japanese); Howard Wang (English)
Noa Sheldon (ノア・シェルダン, Noa Sherudan)
Voiced by: Yurika Kubo (Japanese); Madeleine Morris (English)
Xue-Mei Liu (劉雪梅, Ryū Shuemei)
Voiced by: Eri Suzuki (Japanese); Apphia Yu (English)
Alphonse Brustad (アルフォンス・ブリュスタット, Arufonsu Buryusutatto)
Voiced by: Kenji Nojima
Souffle Clearrail (スフレ・クリアレール, Sufure Kuriarēru)
Voiced by: Rina Satō
Sakura's manager, she is also a genetic engineer who treated her when she is struck by an unknown illness. Both she and Charlotte attended the same university and are even classmates.
Judal Harvey (ジュダル・ハーヴェイ, Judaru Hāvei)
Voiced by: Yoshimasa Hosoya (Japanese); Ian Sinclair (English)
Liza and Claire's older brother. He is the president of the Warslran Research Facility. He acts professionally but also seems rather sadistic and unsympathetic.
Claudia Lowetti (クラウディア・ローエッティ, Kuraudia Rōetti)
Voiced by: Chinatsu Akasaki (Japanese); Bryn Apprill (English)
Emile's friend from Gudenburg. She is very protective of Emile and heartily wishes for her to come home with her. When Emile refuses however, she puts the blame on Hayato and is constantly wanting to prove she is better than him to get Emile to come home. Despite Emile telling her to call her Emile, she still addresses her as Emilia, her real name.
Krovanh Olfred (クロヴァン・オルフレッド, Kurovan Orufureddo)
Voiced by: Yūhei Takagi (Japanese); Josh Grelle (English)
One of the three Hunters that have Variant powers injected into them by Vitaly. He, along with his two sisters, were originally orphans who were slaves and treated brutally, causing him to hate the world. He is very protective of them and puts their safety at the highest priority.

Nesat Olfred (ネサット・オルフレッド, Nesatto Orufureddo)
Voiced by: Saori Ōnishi
One of the three Hunters that have Variant powers injected into them by Vitaly. She, along with her brother and sister, were originally orphans who were slaves and treated brutally. When they escaped together, her eye was injured, and was brought to Vitaly for treatment. There, Vitaly injects each of them with Variant powers, and gives her injured eye the power to duplicate objects. She is quieter than her brother and sister.
Nakri Olfred (ナクリー・オルフレッド, Nakurī Orufureddo)
Voiced by: Machico (Japanese); Alexis Tipton (English)
One of the three Hunters that have Variant powers injected into them by Vitaly. She, along with her brother and sister, were originally orphans who were slaves and treated brutally. As such, she develops an obstinate personality. She is also very active.
Vitaly Tynyanov (ヴィタリー・トゥイニャーノフ, Vitarī Tuinyānofu)
Voiced by: Romi Park (Japanese); Monica Rial (English)
One of the main antagonists of the series. She was originally a member of the Warslan Research Facility, allowing her to gain much access to the data of the Little Garden and have much knowledge about the technologies. She later developed many Savage-like monsters to attack the Little Garden.
Ally Harlech (アリー・ハーレフ, Arī Hārefu)
Voiced by: Haruka Chisuga
Wendy Velvet (ウェンディ・ベルベット, Wendi Berubetto)
Voiced by: Nanami Yamashita
Zayed Huffman (ザイード・ハフマン, Zaīdo Hafuman)
Voiced by: Hinata Tadokoro

== Media ==
=== Light novel ===
The Hundred light novel series is written by Jun Misaki, with illustrations by Nekosuke Ōkuma. SB Creative published 16 volumes from November 15, 2012, to October 15, 2018, under their GA Bunko imprint.

No.	Title	Release date	ISBN
1	Variant Awakening; Vuarianto Kakusei (ヴァリアント覚醒)	November 15, 2012	978-4-7973-7192-5
2	Diva of Love Song; Utahime no Rabu Songu (歌姫のラブソング)	March 15, 2013	978-4-7973-7309-7
3	Red Queen and Thorn Princess; Akaki Joō to Toraware no Ibara Hime (赤き女王と囚われの荊姫)	July 13, 2013	978-4-7973-7484-1
4	Gardens Crisis; Gādenzu Kuraishisu (ガーデンズ・クライシス)	December 14, 2013	978-4-7973-7583-1
5	Dual Act; Dyueru Akuto (デュアルアクト)	May 15, 2014	978-4-7973-7715-6
6	Third Attack; Sādo Atakku (サード・アタック)	October 15, 2014	978-4-7973-8039-2
7	World Martial Arts Tournament (Part 1); Zen Sekai Bugei Taikai <ue> (全世界武芸大会<上>)	March 15, 2015	978-4-7973-8278-5
8	World Martial Arts Tournament (Part 2); Zen Sekai Bugei Taikai <shita> (全世界武芸大会<下>)	August 12, 2015	978-4-7973-8469-7; 978-4-7973-8424-6 (SE)
9	Small Beginnings; Sumōru Biginingusu (スモール・ビギニングス)	December 15, 2015	978-4-7973-8603-5
10	Dream Soldier; Dorīmu Sorujā (ドリーム・ソルジャー)	April 15, 2016	978-4-7973-8693-6; 978-4-7973-8692-9 (SE)
11	Little Fragments; Ritoru Furagumentsu (リトル・フラグメンツ)	June 15, 2016	978-4-7973-8716-2; 978-4-7973-8717-9 (SE)
12	Harvest Time; Hāvuesuto Taimu (ハーヴェスト・タイム)	November 15, 2016	978-4-7973-8985-2
13	Noblesse Oblige; Noburesu Oburīju (ノブレス・オブリージュ)	May 15, 2017	978-4-7973-9279-1
14	Save the Universe; Sēbu za Yunibāsu (セーブ・ザ・ユニバース)	September 25, 2017	978-4-7973-9525-9
15	Attack on the Factory; Atakku on za Fakutorī (アタック・オン・ザ・ファクトリー)	July 14, 2018	978-4-7973-9829-8
16	Catch the Future; Kyatchi za Fuyūchā (キャッチ・ザ・フューチャー)	October 15, 2018	978-4-7973-9915-8

=== Manga ===
A manga adaptation, illustrated by Sasayuki, was serialized in Fujimi Shobo's shōnen manga magazine Monthly Dragon Age between the December 2013 and January 2015 issues. Two tankōbon volumes were released on August 8, 2015.

No.	Release date	ISBN
1	August 8, 2015	978-4-04-070172-1
2	August 8, 2015	978-4-04-070661-0

=== Anime ===
An anime television series adaptation, produced by Production IMS and directed by Tomoki Kobayashi, aired from April 5 to June 20, 2016. Miyu Matsuki was initially cast as Charlotte Dimandias, but she was replaced by Yui Horie following her death in October 2015. The opening theme is "Bloodred" by D-Selections, and the first ending theme is "Eyes On Me" by Rumi Ōkubo and Mayu Yoshioka. The second ending theme is "Tabooless" by M.A.O, Rika Kinugawa, and Yui Makino. The third ending theme is "Hardy Buddy" by Yuka Ōtsubo and Wataru Hatano. The fourth ending theme is "Jewels Of Love" by Mayu Yoshioka and Kaya Okuno. Funimation has licensed the series in North America.
