= Miracle Girls Festival =

2015 video game

- Developer: Sega
- Publisher: Sega
- Platform: PlayStation Vita
- Release: JP: December 17, 2015
- Genre: Rhythm game
- Mode: Single-player

Miracle Girls Festival (ミラクルガールズフェスティバル, Mirakuru Gāruzu Fesutibaru) is a crossover rhythm game developed and published by Sega for the PlayStation Vita. It was released in Japan on December 17, 2015.

The game uses the same engine and gameplay as the Hatsune Miku: Project DIVA series of rhythm games, and features characters and songs from the following Japanese anime series: YuruYuri, Nyaruko: Crawling with Love, Vividred Operation, Kin-iro Mosaic, Arpeggio of Blue Steel, Tesagure! Bukatsu-mono, Wake Up, Girls!, Project 575, No-Rin, Engaged to the Unidentified and Is the Order a Rabbit?.

== Song list ==
There are a total of 22 songs from 11 different anime series. Each of the 22 songs features a 3D PV with 3D models of the anime characters from the respective series.

Song List
Song name	Performed by	Series
ゆりゆららららゆるゆり大事件 (Yuriyurarararayuruyuri Daijiken)	Nanamori Middle School Amusement Club	YuruYuri
いぇす!ゆゆゆ☆ゆるゆり♪♪ (Yes! YuYuYu☆YuruYuri♪♪)	Nanamori Middle School Amusement Club	YuruYuri
太陽曰く燃えよカオス (Taiyou Iwaku Moeyo Chaos)	Ushirokara Haiyoritai G	Nyaruko: Crawling with Love
恋は渾沌の隷也 (Koi wa Chaos no Shimobenari)	Ushirokara Haiyoritai G	Nyaruko: Crawling with Love
Vivid Shining Sky	Akane Isshiki (Ayane Sakura), Aoi Futaba (Rie Murakawa), Wakaba Saegusa (Yuka Ootsubo), Himawari Shinomiya (Aya Uchida) & Rei Kuroki (Maaya Uchida)	Vividred Operation
ありふれたしあわせ (Arifureta Shiawase)	Rei Kuroki (Maaya Uchida)	Vividred Operation
Jumping!!	Rhodanthe*	Kin-iro Mosaic
Your Voice	Rhodanthe*	Kin-iro Mosaic
ブルー・フィールド (Blue Field)	Trident (Mai Fuchigami, Manami Numakura, and Hibiki Yamamura)	Arpeggio of Blue Steel
Innocent Blue	Trident (Mai Fuchigami, Manami Numakura, and Hibiki Yamamura)	Arpeggio of Blue Steel
Stand Up!!!!	Yua Suzuki (Asuka Nishi), Hina Satou (Satomi Akesaka), Aoi Takahashi (Karin Ogino), and Koharu Tanaka (Ayaka Ohashi)	Tesagure! Bukatsumono
てさぐり部部歌 (Tesagure Club Song)	Yua Suzuki (Asuka Nishi), Hina Satou (Satomi Akesaka), Aoi Takahashi (Karin Ogino), and Koharu Tanaka (Ayaka Ohashi)	Tesagure! Bukatsumono
タチアガレ! (Tachiagare!)	Wake Up, Girls!	Wake Up, Girls!
7 Girls War	Wake Up, Girls!	Wake Up, Girls!
コトバ・カラフル (Kotoba Colorful)	Utayome 575	Go! Go! 575
コトバ・サガシタイ (Kotoba Sagashitai)	Utayome 575	Go! Go! 575
も・ぎ・た・て♡フルーツガールズ (Mogitate ♥ Fruit Girls)	Ringo Kinoshita (Yukari Tamura) and Minori Nakazawa (Kana Hanazawa)	No-Rin
コードレス☆照れ☆PHONE (Cordless Telephone)	Yuka Kusakabe (Yukari Tamura)	No-Rin
とまどい→レシピ (Tomadoi→Recipe)	Mikakuning!	Engaged to the Unidentified
まっしろわーるど (Masshiro World)	Mikakuning!	Engaged to the Unidentified
Daydream café	Petit Rabbit's (Ayane Sakura, Inori Minase, Risa Taneda, Satomi Sato, Maaya Uchida)	Is the Order a Rabbit?
ぽっぴんジャンプ♪ (Poppin Jump♪)	Chimame-tai (Inori Minase, Sora Tokui, Rie Murakawa)	Is the Order a Rabbit?
