= Death March to the Parallel World Rhapsody =

Japanese light novel series

- Cover of the first light novel volume

デスマーチからはじまる異世界狂想曲 (Desu Māchi Kara Hajimaru Isekai Kyōsōkyoku)
- Genre: Fantasy, harem, isekai
- Novel series
- Written by: Hiro Ainana
- Published by: Shōsetsuka ni Narō
- Original run: March 3, 2013 – present
- Light novel
- Written by: Hiro Ainana
- Illustrated by: shri
- Published by: Fujimi Shobo
- English publisher: NA: Yen Press
- Imprint: Fujimi Shobo Novels
- Original run: March 17, 2014 – present
- Volumes: 36
- Manga
- Written by: Ayamegumu
- Published by: Fujimi Shobo
- English publisher: NA: Yen Press
- Magazine: Age Premium (2014–2015); Monthly Dragon Age (2015 – present)
- Original run: November 9, 2014 – present
- Volumes: 20
- Anime television series
- Directed by: Shin Oonuma
- Produced by: Tomoyuki Oowada; Youhei Kikuchi; Masaru Seto; Yoshiyuki Shioya; Shouta Watase; Takashi Murakami; Yousuke Shimizu; Yukiko Arakawa; Tsuyoshi Ochiai
- Written by: Kento Shimoyama
- Music by: Kuniyuki Takahashi (Monaca)
- Studio: Silver Link; Connect
- Licensed by: Crunchyroll (streaming); SA/SEA: Muse Communication
- Original network: AT-X, Tokyo MX, BS11, Sun TV
- English network: SEA: Animax Asia
- Original run: January 11, 2018 – March 29, 2018
- Episodes: 12
- Manga

Arisa Ōjo no Isekai Funtōki
- Written by: Akira Segami
- Published by: Fujimi Shobo
- Magazine: Monthly Dragon Age
- Original run: February 9, 2018 – July 9, 2018
- Volumes: 1
- Manga

Death March kara Hajimaru Isekai Kōfukukyoku
- Written by: Tsurumi
- Published by: Fujimi Shobo
- Magazine: Monthly Dragon Age
- Original run: January 8, 2022 – February 29, 2023
- Volumes: 2
- icon

Death March to the Parallel World Rhapsody (Japanese: デスマーチからはじまる異世界狂想曲, Hepburn: Desu Māchi Kara Hajimaru Isekai Kyōsōkyoku) is a Japanese light novel series written by Hiro Ainana. It began serialization online in 2013 on the user-generated novel publishing website Shōsetsuka ni Narō until it was acquired by Fujimi Shobo. The first volume of the Light Novel was published in March 2014. A manga adaptation by Ayamegumu ran in Age Premium until the magazine ceased publication, and was then transferred to Monthly Dragon Age. Both the light novels and the manga adaptation have been licensed for publication in North America by Yen Press. An anime television series adaptation by Silver Link and Connect aired from January 11 to March 29, 2018. A sequel has been announced.

== Plot ==
Ichiro Suzuki is a 29-year old game programmer who was tasked with fixing several bugs in two MMORPGs his company is preparing for publication. However, he becomes extremely worn out as he is working during the weekend. After taking a nap, he mysteriously wakes up in a parallel world that resembles some of the fantasy RPG worlds he had worked on, as a 15-year old named Satou, later Satou Pendragon, a nickname he uses while running beta tests, and with what looks like the menu screen of the game he was working on appearing before his inner eye.

However, before he can grasp his current situation, an army of lizardmen ambushes him and launches an all-out attack on him. In desperation, he uses all three of his special 'Meteor Rain' attack options (a quick fix he added to the game for new players which kills all enemies in the vicinity) at once and wipes them all out - accidentally killing a god as well. As a result, his level jumps from 1 to 310, maximizing his stats immensely and making him one of the most powerful people in the world. With no way to return to his world, and as a high-leveled adventurer armed with a myriad of different physical, cognitive and magical abilities and weapons, he sets out to uncover the secrets of this new world, earning the trust and affection of many people in the process while keeping his overpowered stats concealed.

He plans to travel the world and he forms a party with slaves he rescues including liza the lizard girl; and two little cat and dog girls named tama and pochi ; and arisa a reincarnated fallen princess along with her sister lulu. later mia an elf, joins his party after he rescues her from an undead wizard and nana a homunculus who worked for the undead wizard and after defeating his master , satou becomes his master. Later he adopts the secret persona of nanashi the hero and defeats a resurrected evil king and saves the world in multiple occasions. He becomes a hereditary knight andgets him self a family name " pendragon ".

== Characters ==
Ichirou Suzuki (鈴木一郎, Suzuki Ichirō) / Satou Pendragon (サトゥー・ペンドラゴン, Satū Pendoragon)
Voiced by: Shun Horie (Japanese); Justin Briner (English)
Ichirou is a 29-year old game programmer who is transferred to another world, where he finds himself in a 15-year old body. His new name is based the handle he uses to test games. Using all three of the special Meteor Shower items in his possession, Satou wipes out a massive hostile force composed of high-level lizardmen, which increases his level from 1 to 310 instantly and grants him an immense pool of skill points. He also gains a huge amount of money and a vast number of valuable items. Upon arriving in Seiryuu, Satou pretends to be a young merchant and acquires new documents in which he hides his true level. Rather than be tied down to any one place, Satou wants to explore the world and try to understand how he arrived in the other world. He typically arms himself with magic pistols and short swords, but uses high level weapons while in disguise.
Zena Marienteil (ゼナ・マリエンテール, Zena Marientēru)
Voiced by: Rie Takahashi (Japanese); Julie Shields (English)
A 17-year-old mage soldier who becomes Satou's first friend in the other world. She joined the military to avoid being married to a noble by her parents, but seems to be comfortable around Satou. In fact, she appears to have a crush on him. She is friends with Iona, Lilio, and Ruu. She is determined to join Satou after her term of military service ends.
Pochi (ポチ)
Voiced by: Hiyori Kono (Japanese); Brittney Karbowski (English)
Originally called Dog, she is a 10-year-old dog demi-human turned slave until Satou rescues her from a dungeon, and who has travelled with him since then. She wields a short sword and buckler.
Pochi is a typical dog name.
Tama (タマ)
Voiced by: Kaya Okuno (Japanese); Margaret McDonald (English)
Originally called Cat, Tama is a 10-year-old child cat demi-human slave whom Satou rescued along with Pochi and Liza. An energetic person, she fights using dual knives. She was age 10 at the debut of the show and is currently 12.
Tama means "jewel".
Liza (リザ, Riza)
Voiced by: Minami Tsuda (Japanese); Brittany Lauda (English)
Liza is an 18-year-old orange scale lizardkin demi-human slave, who looked after Pochi and Tama. Her name is a shortened form of her original name, which is too difficult for humans to pronounce; it is not derived from lizard, although her former owner referred to her as Lizard. She was rescued by Satou and joins his party. Liza's favorite weapon is the spear that Satuu made for her from a monster's claw.
Arisa (アリサ)
Voiced by: Aoi Yūki (Japanese); Monica Rial (English)
Arisa is an 11-year-old fallen princess who was enslaved after her country was invaded and her parents executed. Satou bought her when he discovered that she understands Japanese. She actually is a Japanese woman formerly named Arisa Tachibana, who died on Earth and was reincarnated in the other world, and is therefore much more mature than the other girls in Satuu's party despite her young age. Along with Lulu, she is under a geas that prevents her slave status being revoked. She initially specializes in psychic magic. The menu system she uses differs from Satuu's in that it is more limited; her inventory has limited space and does not keep items in stasis. Despite her age, she sees Satou as her ideal man.
Lulu (ルル, Ruru)
Voiced by: Marika Hayase (Japanese); Jill Harris (English)
A 14-year-old slave whose great-grandfather was Japanese. Despite Satou considering her beautiful by Japanese standards, her black hair and Asian features are considered unattractive by humans of the current world. Satou purchased her along with Arisa, her half-sister. Satou asks her to teach him to drive a wagon after he learns that she was taught to drive carriages during her slavery. Like her sister, Lulu falls in love with Satou; because she feels safe and appreciated.
Misanaria Bolenan (ミサナリーア・ボルエナン, Misanarīa Boruenan)
Voiced by: Airi Eino (Japanese); Tia Ballard (English)
Also known as Mia, she is a 130 year old juvenile Elf with magical abilities whom Satuu rescued when she was kidnapped as part of Undead King Zen's plot. She develops a crush on Satou and now travels with him until they can bring her back home. Mia speaks in short sentences and does not initially eat meat.
Nana (ナナ)
Voiced by: Kiyono Yasuno (Japanese); Megan Shipman (English)
A homunculus in the form of a comely human female, who was created by the undead sorcerer, Zen, and whom Satou rescued from the collapse of Zen's dungeon, along with her 7 identical sisters/clones. While her sisters leave on a separate mission, Nana (Japanese for her original name, "Number Seven") chooses to stay by Satou's side and to serve him. Nana often needs magic infusions to her core; which Satou does by touching her back. She is armed with a sword and shield and acts as the party's tank.
Iona (イオナ)
Voiced by: Rika Kinugawa (Japanese); Carli Mosier (English)
Iona is a soldier in Seiryuu City's territorial army, and friends with Zena, Lilio, and Ruu. She wears plate armor and wields a bastard sword.
Lilio (リリオ, Ririo)
Voiced by: Yuki Nagano (Japanese); Morgan Berry (English)
Lilio is a soldier in Seiryuu City's territorial army, and friends with Zena, Iona, and Ruu. Her main weapon is a crossbow.
Ruu (ルウ)
Voiced by: Wakana Kowaka (Japanese); Natalie Hoover (English)
Ruu is a soldier belonging to Seiryuu City's territorial army, and friends with Zena, Lilio, and Iona.
Martha (マーサ, Māsa)
Voiced by: Nanami Atsugi (Japanese); Luci Christian (English)
She is the daughter of Mosa and a waitress at the Gate Inn in Seiryuu City. Despite being only 13 years old, she looks like a mid-teenager and is very well endowed.
Mosa (モーサ, Mōsa)
Voiced by: Yūko Gotō (Japanese); Cynthia Cranz (English)
Mosa is the innkeeper at the Gate Inn and Martha's mother.
Yuni (ユニ)
Voiced by: Ryōna Kuchioka (Japanese); Jeannie Tirado (English)
A young orphaned girl who works around the Gate Inn. She became friends with Pochi and Tama and learned to read with them using Satou's picture cards.
Ohna (オーナ, Ōna)
Voiced by: Rie Suegara (Japanese); Jamie Marchi (English)
Ohna is a Priestess at the Parion Temple in Seiryuu City who serves the goddess Parion.
Boido (ボイド)
Voiced by: Kōji Seki (Japanese); J. Michael Tatum (English)
He is the Head Priest at the Zaicuon Temple in Seiryuu City. He is a sly man who attempted to trick the populace into believing that demi-humans are demons. He was killed by the demon that created the dungeon in Seiryuu City from which Satou rescued Liza, Tama, and Pochi.
Nidoren (ニドーレン)
Voiced by: Shintaro Tanaka (Japanese); Josh Bangle (English)
He is a slave trader who was caught up in the formation of the dungeon in Seiryuu City. Satou rescued him and later bought Arisa and Lulu from him.
Nadi (ナディ)
Voiced by: Satomi Satō (Japanese); Alexis Tipton (English)
A human woman who works at the Odd Job shop.
Yusaratoya Bolenan (ユサラトーヤ・ボルエナン, Yusaratōya Boruenan)
Voiced by: Yoshitaka Yamaya (Japanese); Stephen Fu (English)
Most commonly known as "Yuuya", he is manager at the Odd Job shop. Yuuya is a green-haired Elf who is a member of a subspecies of Elves with shorter ears, a difference he is very touchy about. He speaks with short sentences and is related to Mia.
Mize (ミゼ)
Voiced by: Shinya Takahashi (Japanese); Barry Yandell (English)
He is a were rat knight and the leader of the were rat riders who is known around the kingdom as "Red Helmet." He helped Mia after she escaped from the Cradle. However, he and his group were attacked by Zen and he was severely injured, losing his ear in the process.
Dryad (ドライアド)
Voiced by: Chitose Morinaga (Japanese); Dani Chambers (English)
A monster Satou encounters in the Cradle that only requires mana and water to survive; she can take mana from kisses. She is able to move people between locations within the Cradle. After the Cradle is destroyed, she tells Satuu that she can be found wherever there is a forest.
Zen (ゼン)
Voiced by: Masuo Amada (Japanese); David Wald (English)
A powerful sorcerer turned king of the undead. Zen is a reincarnated person who was reborn into a loving noble family in the fantasy world. He was betrayed by a jealous noble, who desired his wife, which led to his death, his family's execution, and his wife's rape and death. Zen's intense desire for revenge caused him to rise as a powerful undead that avenged the deaths of his family by killing not only the noble responsible, but his entire extended family as well. While Zen challenges Satou to a contest of strength and will for custody of Misanaria, his actual desire is to die at the hands of a true hero. After Satuu passes the tests, he slays Zen, ending his immortal undead existence. Before he disappears, Zen warns Satou to watch over Arisa and not allow her to make the same mistakes that he did.
Zen's story became a play, but nobles demanded the ending changed, so they can preserve their image of "good guys"; though the commoners don't buy it.

== Media ==
=== Light novel ===
Hiro Ainana first published Death March to the Parallel World Rhapsody as a web novel on the user-generated content site Shōsetsuka ni Narō in 2013, before republishing it as a light novel with illustrations by shri. The first volume was released by Fujimi Shobo in March 2014. Thirty-six volumes have been released to date. North American publisher Yen Press announced its license to the novels on May 20, 2016.

No.	Original release date	Original ISBN	English release date	English ISBN
1	March 17, 2014	978-4-04-070084-7	January 24, 2017	978-0-316-50463-8
2	July 16, 2014	978-4-04-070307-7	May 23, 2017	978-0-316-50797-4
3	November 20, 2014	978-4-04-070308-4	September 19, 2017	978-0-316-55608-8
4	April 18, 2015	978-4-04-070596-5	January 30, 2018	978-0-316-55609-5
5	August 20, 2015	978-4-04-070707-5	May 22, 2018	978-0-316-55610-1
6	December 10, 2015	978-4-04-070708-2	September 18, 2018	978-0-316-55612-5
7	April 9, 2016	978-4-04-070872-0	January 22, 2019	978-1-9753-0155-2
8	August 10, 2016	978-4-04-072018-0	May 21, 2019	978-1-9753-0157-6
9	December 10, 2016	978-4-04-072126-2	September 24, 2019	978-1-9753-0159-0
10	April 10, 2017	978-4-04-072257-3	January 21, 2020	978-1-9753-0161-3
11	August 10, 2017	978-4-04-072405-8	May 26, 2020	978-1-9753-0163-7
12	December 10, 2017	978-4-04-072409-6	October 20, 2020	978-1-9753-0165-1
Ex	January 10, 2018	978-4-04-072576-5	—	—
13	March 10, 2018	978-4-04-072575-8	March 2, 2021	978-1-9753-1839-0
14	July 10, 2018	978-4-04-072800-1	June 22, 2021	978-1-9753-2080-5
15	November 10, 2018	978-4-04-072793-6	November 16, 2021	978-1-9753-2082-9
16	March 3, 2019	978-4-04-072802-5	April 5, 2022	978-1-9753-2084-3
17	August 9, 2019	978-4-04-073243-5	July 26, 2022	978-1-9753-2086-7
18	November 9, 2019	978-4-04-073244-2	February 21, 2023	978-1-9753-4395-8
19	March 10, 2020	978-4-04-073245-9; 978-4-04-073445-3 (SP)	September 19, 2023	978-1-9753-4397-2
20	July 10, 2020	978-4-04-073246-6	December 12, 2023	978-1-9753-4399-6
21	November 10, 2020	978-4-04-073865-9	May 21, 2024	978-1-9753-4401-6
22	April 9, 2021	978-4-04-073866-6	October 15, 2024	978-1-9753-4403-0
23	July 9, 2021	978-4-04-074156-7	March 18, 2025	978-1-9753-4405-4
Ex2	August 10, 2021	978-4-04-074190-1	—	—
24	February 10, 2022	978-4-04-074302-8; 978-4-04-074305-9 (SP)	November 25, 2025	978-1-9753-6267-6
25	May 9, 2022	978-4-04-074550-3	September 8, 2026	978-1-9753-6269-0
26	September 9, 2022	978-4-04-074663-0	January 12, 2027	979-8-8554-1046-4
27	January 10, 2023	978-4-04-074817-7	—	—
28	June 9, 2023	978-4-04-075006-4	—	—
29	February 9, 2024	978-4-04-075155-9	—	—
30	July 10, 2024	978-4-04-075533-5	—	—
31	November 9, 2024	978-4-04-075655-4	—	—
Ex3	December 10, 2024	978-4-04-075572-4	—	—
32	March 10, 2025	978-4-04-075853-4	—	—
33	August 8, 2025	978-4-04-076051-3	—	—
34	December 10, 2025	978-4-04-076199-2	—	—
35	March 10, 2026	978-4-04-076332-3	—	—
36	August 10, 2026	978-4-04-076517-4	—	—
37	January 8, 2027	978-4-04-076718-5	—	—

=== Manga ===
Ayamegumu began serializing a manga adaptation in Fujimi Shobo's Age Premium magazine in December 2014. Age Premium ceased publication with its 49th issue on July 9, 2016, and the manga was one of five titles that were transferred to Monthly Dragon Age. The manga has been licensed by Yen Press.

Akira Segami launched a prequel manga, titled Death March to the Parallel World Rhapsody Ex: Princess Arisa's Otherworldly Struggle (デスマーチからはじまる異世界狂想曲 Ex アリサ王女の異世界奮闘記, Death March Kara Hajimaru Isekai Kyōsōkyoku EX: Arisa Ōjo no Isekai Funtōki), adapted from the short story by the same name in Death March to the Parallel World Rhapsody: Ex, in Fujimi Shobo's shōnen manga magazine Monthly Dragon Age on February 9, 2018. The manga ended on July 9, 2018.

A gourmet spin-off manga by Tsurumi, titled Death March kara Hajimaru Isekai Kōfukukyoku, was serialized in Monthly Dragon Age from the February 2022 issue released on January 8, 2022, to the March 2023 issue released on February 9, 2023. It centers around the character, Phantom Chef Lulu.

No.	Original release date	Original ISBN	English release date	English ISBN
1	April 18, 2015	978-4-04-070576-7	November 22, 2016	978-0-316-55276-9
2	December 5, 2015	978-4-04-070784-6	March 21, 2017	978-0-316-46923-4
3	August 9, 2016	978-4-04-070991-8	July 18, 2017	978-0-316-43962-6
4	December 10, 2016	978-4-04-072114-9	December 19, 2017	978-0-316-41402-9
5	August 10, 2017	978-4-04-072387-7	October 30, 2018	978-1-9753-8088-5
6	December 9, 2017	978-4-04-072527-7	January 22, 2019	978-1-9753-0205-4
7	August 9, 2018	978-4-04-072837-7	April 30, 2019	978-1-9753-0412-6
8	March 9, 2019	978-4-04-073091-2	November 12, 2019	978-1-9753-5952-2
9	October 9, 2019	978-4-04-073354-8	May 26, 2020	978-1-9753-1112-4
10	May 9, 2020	978-4-04-073650-1	February 3, 2021	978-1-9753-2010-2
11	December 9, 2020	978-4-04-073899-4	October 5, 2021	978-1-9753-3649-3
12	July 9, 2021	978-4-04-074169-7	August 23, 2022	978-1-9753-4487-0
13	February 9, 2022	978-4-04-074426-1	February 21, 2023	978-1-9753-5998-0
Anthology	February 9, 2022	978-4-04-074436-0	—	—
14	August 9, 2022	978-4-04-074634-0	June 20, 2023	978-1-9753-6901-9
15	March 9, 2023	978-4-04-074900-6	March 19, 2024	978-1-9753-8793-8
16	October 6, 2023	978-4-04-075166-5	December 10, 2024	979-8-8554-0175-2
17	May 9, 2024	978-4-04-075433-8	August 26, 2025	979-8-8554-1536-0
18	December 9, 2024	978-4-04-075702-5	March 24, 2026	979-8-8554-2324-2
19	December 9, 2025	978-4-04-076142-8; 978-4-04-076144-2 (SP)	January 26, 2027	979-8-8554-4764-4
20	November 9, 2026	978-4-04-076628-7	—	—

=== Anime ===
An anime adaptation was announced via a wraparound band on the fourth volume of the manga on December 10, 2016. The television series is directed by Shin Oonuma at Silver Link and Connect with scripts written by Kento Shimoyama, while Shoko Takimoto designed the characters. MONACA composed the music at DIVE II Entertainment. The series aired from January 11 to March 29, 2018, on AT-X, with further broadcasts on Tokyo MX and BS11. It ran for 12 episodes and covers the first 3 volumes of the light novel. The opening theme is "suraidoraido" (スライドライド, Slide Ride) by Run Girls, Run! while the ending theme is "Suki no sukiru" (スキノスキル) by Wake Up, Girls!. Crunchyroll streamed the series, while Funimation streamed an English dub.

A sequel to the anime series was announced in November 2024.

No.	Title (Note: All English titles are taken from Crunchyroll.)	Original release date
1	"The Catastrophe That Started with a Death March"; Transliteration: "Desumāchi kara hajimaru tenpenchii" (Japanese: デスマーチからはじまる天変地異)	January 11, 2018
Suzuki Ichirou is a programmer who is working a death march (along a few other good coworkers) to keep up with a nightmare combination of unreasonable deadlines and unreliable coworkers as well as understaffing. After crawling under his desk for a nap he wakes up in a combination world of the two games he was working on before his nap with no clue how he got there and what is going on. He discovers that he is younger and that his name his now Satou (which was his beta tester handle). He is set upon by a horde of monsters while he is getting his bearing and that is when he realizes it is not like a regular dream he can feel pain, but his inside knowledge and powerful ability saves him and he sets out to the nearest city to set a base of operation and figure things out.
2	"Exploring a City That Started With a Death March"; Transliteration: "Desumāchi kara hajimaru shinai sansaku" (Japanese: デスマーチからはじまる市内散策)	January 18, 2018
He arrives at the city after saving a knight named Zena from a wyvern. He registers as a merchant and goes to an inn. There, he meets the daughter of the innkeeper, who brings him shopping for supplies. He also eats plenty and wakes up the next day to find Zena waiting to show him around the city as a thank you for saving her.
3	"Love That Started With a Death March"; Transliteration: "Desumāchi kara hajimaru ren'ai jijō" (Japanese: デスマーチからはじまる恋愛事情)	January 25, 2018
Satou and Zena make their way around the city and it is history. Sharing cute moments and food. They stumble upon a scene of three demi-human slaves about to be stoned to death by the citizens. All of this was incited by a demon possessing a slave trader. As the demon emerges, something happens and it ends on a cliffhanger.
4	"Labyrinth Exploration That Started With a Death March"; Transliteration: "Desumāchi kara hajimaru meikyū tansaku" (Japanese: デスマーチからはじまる迷宮探索)	February 1, 2018
Satou is with the three demi-human slaves in a dungeon conjured up by the demon, which they have been transported into. He discovers that more people are somewhere in the dungeon as well. Satou helps the slaves by giving them clothes, food, healing balm and weapons so they can help him take on the monsters and they make their way to the others as the girls level up. Satou makes sure he gets separated from the group when the demon appears again so he can put on a disguise (keep his identity and powers hidden from every one) and kill the demon. Before the demon dies, it summons a demon lord and Satou has to fight it too. He cannot wield the holy sword yet because he does not have the title hero, so he kills it with a divine sword since he has god slayer. They return to town and he decides to keep the three slaves.
5	"The Crazy Princess That Started With a Death March"; Transliteration: "Desumāchi kara hajimaru ranshin ōjo" (Japanese: デスマーチからはじまる乱心王女)	February 8, 2018
Satou meets another Japanese person. This one (Arisa) has been reincarnated and through a series of events, ended up as a slave. He buys her and another slave named Lulu who is a descendant of a Japanese person as she has black her and Asian characteristics link to Japanese. He buys them food and while they eat he goes out to buy them clothes and more food, which he gives some of the food to other demi-human slaves he saw on the way back to them. He brings the group to the inn, but unfortunately, they do not have more rooms available. They do have a bigger room, so they upgrade it to a room with two beds, and the other three sleep in the stables after Arisa calms down the crowd in the inn, who are hostile towards the three demi-humans (Pochi, Tama and Liza). He also has to deal with Zema the next day after a misunderstanding.
6	"City Defense That Began With a Death March"; Transliteration: "Desumāchi kara hajimaru toshi bōei" (Japanese: デスマーチからはじまる都市防衛)	February 15, 2018
With 5 girls now in his care, Satou needs to find more permanent lodging. While he hunts for a new place with Zena, the girls go shopping and they meet up later as he goes to the market while waiting for more options for places to stay. They go see a play and were about to get food when the city is attacked by flying ants and the girls and Satou spring into action to protect it. Later that evening, Satou goes to find medicine for Lulu as she is not feeling good, and stumbles upon monsters and a wounded stranger that mention the manager's name of the real estate place he went to earlier. He brings the stranger there.
7	"Camping Lessons That Began With a Death March"; Transliteration: "Desumāchi kara hajimaru yaei kunren" (Japanese: デスマーチからはじまる野営訓練)	February 22, 2018
Satou finds out that the wererat knight Mize, the stranger that he rescued, was carrying an elf princess named Mia and that the manager has a connection to her. Satou goes camping with the girls after he decides to buy a cart and two horses. He also goes to practice with Lulu with controlling the cart after getting it since Lulu knew how to. He comes back to find that Mize is finally awake and learnst that Mia had been kidnapped by a dark sorcerer and held in a place called the Cradle until she escaped and with the help of Mize, tried to find the manager for help. The sorcerer sent the army of flying ants after the duo and this was why the city was attacked. It finishes with the blackbird that had been following Satou transforming into a creepy looking undead sorcerer, who is the same one after Mia.
8	"Immortality That Began With a Death March"; Transliteration: "Desumāchi kara hajimaru furōfushi" (Japanese: デスマーチからはじまる不老不死)	March 1, 2018
Satou stands between Mia and the undead sorcerer whom he discover his none other than Zen the figure in the play he had watched earlier that week. Zen fights them a bit, but manages to kidnap Mia again and Satou follows. Zen is surprised he was able to follow and sends to the first floor of what looks like a proper game dungeon. Satou makes his way up, encountering a dryad, who helps him by opening a portal after he gives her mana through a kiss. He eventually makes it back to the boss floor and faces off against the remaining homunculi, which have been powered up, as Zen watches.
9	"Deeply Held Attachment That Started With a Death March"; Transliteration: "Desumāchi kara hajimaru jōshotenmen" (Japanese: デスマチからはじまる情緒纏綿)	March 8, 2018
Satou defeats the last hurdle pretty easily after Zen disappeared with Mia. One of the homunculi asks him to grant their master's wish before he leaves to find Zen. He finds out that his wish was to die and be reunited with his wife as he is tired of being the gods' pawn as a justice seeking undead king. His intentions were never to harm Mia since he had an escape plan ready for her when the Cradle collapsed after his death. Satou kills him and rush off to save the 7th homunculi left on the lower floor, then reunites with everyone outside. The 7th homunculi joins his group as the others go to bury the wedding ring of Zen with his wife's body. Satou then makes preparations to leave the city to bring Mia to her village and says goodbye to Zena.
10	"Hunting Song That Started With a Death March"; Transliteration: "Desumāchi kara hajimaru shuryō gakkyoku" (Japanese: デスマーチからはじまる狩猟楽曲)	March 15, 2018
The journey to return to Mia's home begins, giving Satou the experiment with the item box (his and Arisa). He also experiments with spell crafting and other functionality of this fantasy world. They stumble on the ruins of a gate and meet with the other wererats as well as Mize.
11	"The Fantasy Conspiracy That Started With a Death March"; Transliteration: "Desumāchi kara hajimaru gensō inbō" (Japanese: デスマーチからはじまる幻想陰謀)	March 22, 2018
The journey to take Mia home continues. When they arrive in a town, Satou runs straight into a plot by the local nobles. They are trying to disrupt their deal with the witch of the forest of illusions, but Satou is onto them as he learns alchemy and other skills that could prove useful on their journey.
12	"A Trip to the Underworld That Started With a Death March"; Transliteration: "Desumāchi kara hajimaru i (se)-kai ryojō" (Japanese: デスマーチからはじまる異(世)界旅情)	March 29, 2018
Satou has to deliver on the deal made with the nobles (technically the count, but he is away so the nobles are taking advantage to take the forest as their territory). He makes the bottles needed to store the potions in a kiln, but they are raided by the henchmen of the nobles. Fortunately, Satou has time to make the switch with stuff from his inventory/item box. He has to find a way to cool them down safely; however, as the kiln had been destroyed by the henchmen, so they cannot do that there. He uses Arisa's item box and spells to finish cooling them off on time. He also contacts the witch through her familiar, who contacts the count because he knew that when he made the delivery, they would try something again. The count arrives just in time and also takes those that were taking advantage of their position and titles in custody. The group is finally able to move on after saying goodbye to the witch and her apprentice.

== Reception ==
The series was the 10th best-selling light novel series in Japan during the first half of 2018, selling 211,393 copies.
