= Hacka Doll =

Japanese anime television series

- Hacka Doll the Animation
- Promotional image of the anime television series featuring the main characters.

ハッカドール THE・あにめーしょん
- Genre: Comedy, science fiction
- Anime television series
- Directed by: Ikuo Geso
- Studio: Creators in Pack
- Original network: Tokyo MX, BS11, AT-X
- Original run: October 2, 2015 – December 25, 2015
- Episodes: 13
- icon

Hacka Doll the Animation (ハッカドール THE・あにめーしょん, Hakkadōru THE anime ̄ shon) is a Japanese anime television series based on DeNA's news app Hacka Doll for iOS and Android devices. The anime is produced by Creators in Pack, with collaboration support by Trigger. The series of anime shorts aired on October 2, 2015, in Japan as part of the Ultra Super Anime Time programming block, alongside Kagewani and Miss Monochrome: The Animation 3 and finished on December 25, 2015. The series was simulcast by Crunchyroll.

== Plot ==
In the near future, the media is saturated with information, making it difficult to discern people's true needs and problems. The story revolves around the Hacka Dolls, robots with an AI system created for the help and personal entertainment of its users. Each AI application synchronizes with its user, automatically analyzing their tastes and preferences in order to provide personalized assistance or recommendations. Three of these Hacka Dolls are clumsy though, a trait that sets the plot in motion.

== Characters ==
=== Main characters ===
Hacka Doll #1 (ハッカドール1号, Hakkadōru 1-gō)
Voiced by: Miyu Takagi
Hacka Doll #2 (ハッカドール2号, Hakkadōru 2-gō)
Voiced by: Kaya Okuno
Hacka Doll #3 (ハッカドール3号, Hakkadōru 3-gō)
Voiced by: Nanami Yamashita

=== Supporting characters ===
Hacka Doll #4 (ハッカドール4号, Hakkadōru 4-gō)
Voiced by: Reina Ueda
Hacka Doll #0 (ハッカドール0号, Hakkadōru 0-gō)
Voiced by: Ryōka Yuzuki

== Production ==
The anime is directed by Ikuo Geso who also served as storyboarder, animation director, editor, designer, and digital painter for the anime. Creators in Pack is the main animation studio, and production assistance was provided by Trigger. The Hacka Doll's main three voice actresses (Miyu Takagi, Kaya Okuno, and Nanami Yamashita) sing the anime's opening theme "Touch Tap Baby" and ending theme "Happy Days Refrain".

== Episode list ==
No.	Title	Original release date
1	"Personal Entertainment AI! Hacka Doll!"; Transliteration: "Pāsonaru Entame AI! Hakka Dōru!" (Japanese: パーソナルエンタメAI!ハッカドール！)	October 2, 2015
The ditzy Hacka Dolls #1, #2, and #3 make their debut as official Personal Entertainment AI. However, since these girls are so unbelievably ditzy, they use their own physical presences to take on human job requests.
2	"Please Let Us Be Idols!"; Transliteration: "Aidoru Yarasete Kudasai!" (Japanese: アイドルやらせてください！)	October 9, 2015
A producer of an idol agency takes on too many gigs at once. So the Hacka Dolls decide to advance his career by making their debut as idols on an underground stage.
3	"That's What Hacka Dolls Are For"; Transliteration: "Sono Tane no Hakka Dōru desu" (Japanese: そのためのハッカドールです)	October 16, 2015
A company's fate lies in the hands of a huge project. However, with insufficient funding and an increase in bugs, this new operating system's launch date seems hopeless. If this project fails, the company tanks. Then, the Hacka Dolls are inputted to the system...
4	"Take A Shower First"; Transliteration: "Saki ni Shawā Abite Ki na yo" (Japanese: 先にシャワー浴びてきなよ)	October 23, 2015
Hacka Doll #2 takes on the advancement of a client suffering from the big V. She ends up feeling something similar to excitement over this desperate, yet pure virgin. With a sunset and a moody atmosphere, the couple's feelings advance to the next level.
5	"#4 Isn't Just for Show!"; Transliteration: "4-Gōn wa Date Janai!" (Japanese: 4号はダテじゃない！)	October 30, 2015
Unlike the one-dimensional, non-progressing Hacka Dolls, Hacka Doll #4 is finally rolled out. Now overly specific #4 begins to boister up the ditzy Hacka Dolls?!
6	"A Thing of the Past"; Transliteration: "Omoise no Nānī" (Japanese: 思い出のナーニー)	November 6, 2015
There's an outbreak of some serious bugs in cyberspace, sending the Hacka Dolls into a tizzy. Their hands, feet, and entire bodies are damaged until they lose something very important. Meanwhile, they receive their summoning call. The comparatively sane #3 heads out to advance the client.
7	"KUROBAKO"	November 13, 2015
The Hacka Dolls get mixed up with a hard-as-nails production assistant and end up working on an anime. But when faced with the gap between fantasy and reality, the girls are crushed. They shall continue to work like dogs until KUROBAKO's White Box is complete!
8	"Kind of Main Heroine-ish"; Transliteration: "Nanka Mein Heroin-ppai" (Japanese: なんかメインヒロインっぽい)	November 20, 2015
The Hacka Dolls help a foreign tourist.
9	"The Only Thing That Can Stop Me is Tuesday Routine Maintenance"; Transliteration: "Ore o Tonerareru no wa Kayō no Teikimente Dake" (Japanese: オレをとめられるのは火曜の定期メンテだけだ)	November 27, 2015
The Hacka Dolls enter an online game to save a person trapped inside.
10	"Let's Go to a Hot Spring!"; Transliteration: "Onsen ni Ikō!" (Japanese: 温泉に行こう！)	December 4, 2015
The Hacka Dolls relax at a hot spring.
11	"VA Police, Move Out!"; Transliteration: "Seiyū Keisatsu Shutsudōda!" (Japanese: 声優警察出動だ！)	December 11, 2015
The Hacka Dolls try to find a birthday gift for a voice actor.
12	"Magical Girl Lovely Hurt♥"; Transliteration: "Mahō Shōjo Lovely Hurt♥" (Japanese: 魔法少女 Lovely Hurt♥)	December 18, 2015
The Hacka Dolls become magical girls in a stage show.
13	"HackaDolls Can Handle Anything, Even Comiket"; Transliteration: "Hakka Dōru ni Komike mo Omakase Desu~tsu" (Japanese: ハッカドールにコミケもおまかせですっ)	December 25, 2015
At Comiket, the Hacka Dolls discover their true power.
