= Wake Up, Girls! =

2014 anime by Yutaka Yamamoto and Shin Itagaki

- Cover of first Blu-ray volume
- Genre: Music, Slice of Life
- Created by: Green Leaves
- Anime film

Wake Up, Girls! – Seven Idols
- Directed by: Yutaka Yamamoto
- Produced by: Hiroyuki Tanaka; Satoshi Tanaka; Mika Shimizu; Takashi Yoshizawa; Masahiro Sugasawa; Shūichi Takashino; Seiji Yabashi; Hitoshi Kikuchi; Yū Fujimori
- Written by: Touko Machida
- Music by: Monaca: Satoru Kōsaki
- Studio: Ordet; Tatsunoko Production
- Licensed by: NA: Sentai Filmworks
- Released: January 10, 2014
- Runtime: 53 minutes
- Anime television series
- Directed by: Yutaka Yamamoto
- Produced by: Hiroyuki Tanaka; Satoshi Tanaka; Mika Shimizu; Takashi Yoshizawa; Masahiro Sugasawa; Shūichi Takashino; Seiji Yabashi; Hitoshi Kikuchi; Yū Fujimori
- Written by: Touko Machida
- Music by: Monaca: Satoru Kōsaki
- Studio: Ordet; Tatsunoko Production
- Licensed by: NA: Sentai Filmworks
- Original network: TV Tokyo, TVA, TVO, OX, AT-X
- Original run: January 11, 2014 – March 29, 2014
- Episodes: 12
- Original net animation

Wake Up, Girl ZOO!
- Directed by: Kenshirō Morii
- Studio: Ordet; Studio Moriken
- Released: September 5, 2014 – February 25, 2015
- Episodes: 10
- Anime film

Wake Up, Girls! The Shadow of Youth
- Directed by: Yutaka Yamamoto
- Produced by: Hiroyuki Tanaka; Satoshi Tanaka; Takashi Yoshizawa; Masahiro Sugasawa; Seiji Yabashi; Naoya Moriya; Tetsurō Satomi; Dai Sakai
- Written by: Touko Machida
- Music by: Monaca: Satoru Kōsaki
- Studio: Ordet; Millepensee
- Released: September 25, 2015
- Runtime: 55 minutes
- Anime film

Wake Up, Girls! Beyond the Bottom
- Directed by: Yutaka Yamamoto
- Produced by: Hiroyuki Tanaka; Satoshi Tanaka; Takashi Yoshizawa; Masahiro Sugasawa; Seiji Yabashi; Naoya Moriya; Tetsurō Satomi; Dai Sakai
- Written by: Touko Machida
- Music by: Monaca: Satoru Kōsaki
- Studio: Ordet; Millepensee
- Released: December 11, 2015
- Runtime: 53 minutes
- Anime television series

Wake Up, Girls! New Chapter
- Directed by: Shin Itagaki
- Produced by: Hiroyuki Tanaka; Satoshi Tanaka; Takashi Yoshizawa; Masahiro Sugasawa; Hiroki Enomoto; Mariko Nakajima; Daisuke Kadoya; Shunsuke Matsumura; Sōji Miyagi; Shigenori Araki; Masaru Seto; Hideo Momota
- Written by: Eriko Matsuda
- Music by: Monaca: Satoru Kōsaki
- Studio: Millepensee
- Original network: TV Tokyo, OX, AT-X
- Original run: October 9, 2017 – January 7, 2018
- Episodes: 13
- icon

Wake Up, Girls! is an anime series produced by Ordet and Tatsunoko Production and directed by Yutaka Yamamoto. A film titled Wake Up, Girls! – Seven Idols (Japanese: Wake Up, Girls! 七人のアイドル, Hepburn: Wake Up, Girls! Shichi-nin no Aidoru) opened in Japan on January 11, 2014, and a television series aired in Japan between January and March 2014. The film was streamed online in 108 countries upon its release. A spin-off series, Wake Up, Girl ZOO!, aired between September 2014 and February 2015. Both the series and film are being streamed with English subtitles by Crunchyroll.

A second film, Wake Up!, Girls! Seishun no Kage (Wake Up, Girls！青春の影; lit. "Shadow of Youth"), was released in Japan on September 25, 2015, and another film titled Wake Up, Girls! Beyond the Bottom was released on December 25, 2015. A new anime series titled Wake Up, Girls! New Chapter! (Wake Up, Girls！新章, Wake Up, Girls! Shin Shō) aired from October 9, 2017, to January 7, 2018, and was streamed by Crunchyroll.

Wake Up, Girls! was also the name of a voice acting unit composed of the seven main voice actresses from 2014 to 2019.

== Plot ==
Green Leaves Entertainment is a tiny production company in Sendai, the biggest city in Japan's northeastern Tohoku region. The agency once managed the careers of magicians, photo idols, fortune-tellers, and other entertainers, but its last remaining client finally quit. With the company on the verge of going out of business and in danger of having zero talent (literally), the president Tange hatches an idea of producing an idol group. On the brash president's orders, the dissatisfied manager Matsuda heads out to scout raw talent.

== Characters ==
=== Green Leaves ===
==== Wake Up, Girls! ====
Mayu Shimada (島田 真夢, Shimada Mayu)
Voiced by: Mayu Yoshioka
A high school freshman who used to be center in the famous idol group I-1 Club. She was one of the earliest members of the group, auditioning at age 12. Her popularity as the I-1 Club's center helped the group became more well known, but tensions between her and the group's manager and president Tōru Shiraki, when Mayu protested about the dismissal of her friend from I-1, led to her being fired after her next single lost to that of Shiho Iwazaki, her rival for the center spot, in sales records. This also led to her parents' divorce and an estranged relationship with her mother. In the movie, she is the last of the seven members to join the Wake Up Girls, her reason being seeking her own happiness by becoming an idol once again. She later makes up with her mother after showing the latter how much she enjoys her job and, with her mother's blessing, becomes properly contracted with WUG and Green Leaves (as she joined the group without auditioning). Much like her time in the I-1 Club, Mayu is the center for Wake Up Girls. Her image color is red, and her nickname is Mayushii.
Airi Hayashida (林田 藍里, Hayashida Airi)
Voiced by: Airi Eino
A 15-year-old high school freshman and Mayu's best friend. She's a simple girl with no particular abilities, but with a lot of drive and is a hard worker. Her family owns a sweets store. She was almost fired from WUG when Hayasaka saw her lack of improvement, but Nanase (Yoppi) and Mayu convinced her to stay in the group while the other girls convinced Hayasaka not to fire her. She continues to practice and later becomes just as good as the others during their performances. Her image color is navy blue, and her nickname is Aichan.
Minami Katayama (片山 実波, Katayama Minami)
Voiced by: Minami Tanaka
A 14-year-old girl who enjoys eating various kinds of food and has a big appetite. She is recruited after Junko saw her at a local folk song singing competition, which she won. She is also known to sing at a local home for senior citizens who give her their support during her concerts. She and Miyu are usually the mood makers of the group due to their bubbly and cheerful personalities. Her image color is yellow, and her nickname is Minyami, derived from her catchphrase "Ume nya!" (It's tasty, meow!).
Yoshino Nanase (七瀬 佳乃, Nanase Yoshino)
Voiced by: Yoshino Aoyama
16 years old. She is well-known in Sendai as a former child actress and a model before joining the group. She and Kaya are among the most mature members, often questioning the antics of Kohei and Junko. Because of her having the most experience in the entertainment industry, she's cited as the de facto leader by the group. She is also a very determined person as shown when sprained her foot during a rehearsal for the Idol Festival finals yet continued to practice and perform properly albeit with a slight mishap caused by her injury. Her image color is light blue, and her nickname is Yoppi.
Nanami Hisami (久海 菜々美, Hisami Nanami)
Voiced by: Nanami Yamashita
At 13 years old, Nanami is the youngest member of the group. She constantly practices singing, acting, and playing the piano in hopes of becoming a successful idol. Her dream is to one day perform at a Hikarizuka Theater, a type of Takarazuka play. After an overnight trip to Kesennuma with the group she decides to devote herself to WUG after hearing about Mayu's history. Her image color is purple, and her nickname is Nanamin.
Kaya Kikuma (菊間 夏夜, Kikuma Kaya)
Voiced by: Kaya Okuno
At 18 years old, Kaya is the oldest member of the group. She was originally from Kesennuma, living with her aunt after her parents died when she was young. Kaya then left for Sendai working in various part-time jobs after the fishing vessel "Shotomaru", in which her childhood friend was among the passengers, went missing 3 years prior to the start of the series. She joined the Wake Up Girls on a whim and originally planned to leave when she gets bored, but has since dedicated herself to be with the group. She acts as the group's second-in-command after Yoppi. Her image color is green, and her nickname is Kayatan.
Miyu Okamoto (岡本 未夕, Okamoto Miyu)
Voiced by: Miyu Takagi
A 17 year old girl with a bubbly personality. She has a job at a maid cafe in Sendai and is self-described as "twin-tailed and incompetent". She is willing to participate in almost anything and enjoys being the center of attention whilst respecting others in the group. Miyu is the first person to be successfully recruited by Matsuda as a member of the Wake Up Girls. She and Minami are often the mood makers of the group. Her image color is orange, and her nickname is Myuu.

==== Staff ====
Kōhei Matsuda (松田 耕平, Matsuda Kōhei)
Voiced by: Shintarō Asanuma
The group's manager. While having a good heart, his timid persona and inexperience as an idol manager makes it difficult for him to effectively make decisions that help boost the group's career. He nevertheless cares for the girls and would take action if he sees the girls in an uncomfortable situation. In the movie, it is revealed that he used to play guitar.
Junko Tange (丹下 順子, Tange Junko)
Voiced by: Noriko Hidaka
President of Green Leaves Entertainment and Kohei's superior. A chain-smoker with a brash personality, she often harasses Kohei both physically and verbally on the job. She came up with the name "Wake Up, Girls!" (WUG for short) from a local motel that bears the same name, as well as inspiration from the group Wham!.

=== I-1 Club ===
Shiho Iwasaki (岩崎 志保, Iwasaki Shiho)
Voiced by: Yuka Ōtsubo
17 years old and at her second year of High School. One of the First Generation members of the I-1 Club. She and Mayu competed for the center spot as part of president Shiraki's stipulation and won the spot after defeating Mayu in sales records. Despite being the center of the I-1 Club and her popularity, she continues to view Mayu as a rival. In Beyond the Bottom, Shiho lost her center position to Moka and ended up joining the I-1 Club's branch unit Next Storm. Nicknamed "Shihocchi".
Mai Kondō (近藤 麻衣, Kondō Mai)
Voiced by: Emiri Katō
A First Generation member and one of the oldest members of the I-1 Club at 20 years old. She serves as the group's team captain and is very strict in maintaining their top performances and activities. Nicknamed "Maimai".
Megumi Yoshikawa (吉川 愛, Yoshikawa Megumi)
Voiced by: Minami Tsuda
One of the most popular members of the I-1 Club. 16 years old. She constantly sends text messages to her friend Mayu on the group's progress. She is also a First Generation member of the group. She openly supports Mayu, and WUG as a whole, despite their two groups being rivals. Nicknamed "Yoshimegu".
Nanoka Aizawa (相沢 菜野花, Aizawa Nanoka)
Voiced by: Kaori Fukuhara
19 years old. She is a Second Generation member and one of the most popular members of the group, in part because of her glasses; she is always seen wearing them throughout her performances and promotions. Nicknamed "Nanokasu".
Moka Suzuki (鈴木 萌歌, Suzuki Moka)
Voiced by: Nozomi Yamamoto
13 years old. She is a Fourth Generation Member of the I-1 Club. Despite sharing a surname with Reina and being advertised along with her as sisters, Moka is not related to her. Moka has had a desire to become the I-1 Club's new center, which she eventually achieved in Beyond the Bottom. Her nickname is "Moka-ga".
Reina Suzuki (鈴木 玲奈, Suzuki Reina)
Voiced by: Satomi Akesaka
20 years old. She is a Second Generation Member of the I-1 Club. Despite sharing a surname with Moka and being advertised along with her as sisters, Reina is not related to her. Her nickname is "Ren-Ren".
Tina Kobayakawa (小早川 ティナ, Kobayakawa Tina)
Voiced by: Kiyono Yasuno
18 years old. The only member of the group who is half-Japanese (her mother is English whereas her father is Japanese). Her nickname is "Ti-Na".
Rika Takashina (高科 里佳, Takashina Rika)
Voiced by: Reina Ueda
17 years old by the time of her introduction in Beyond the Bottom, she is the newest member of the I-1 Club, replacing Shiho.
Tōru Shiraki (白木 徹, Shiraki Tōru)
Voiced by: Mitsuru Miyamoto
He is the I-1 Club's General Manager, Producer, Company President. His goal is to push the I-1 Club to be the most popular entertainment group in Japan. He shows little to no emotion and does not change his stern expression, even when publicly giving a speech. Because of his ambitions, he imposes strict guidelines towards the group, in which among those guidelines was that members are forbidden to have any personal relationships and would frequently remove any member of the I-1 Club that does not meet his expectations during training drills, citing that it would tarnish the group's reputation. These led to tensions between him and former center idol Mayu Shimada, which led to her firing when rival Shiho beat her in sales records for their singles.
His belief of forbidding the members to have personal relationships are based on real life instances where idols who are known or even suggested to have such relationships either demoted or removed from their respective groups.
Tasuku Hayasaka (早坂 相, Hayasaka Tasuku)
Voiced by: Kenichi Suzumura
Introduced in Episode 6. An A-list music producer of which the I-1 Club is one of his clients. After seeing the Wake Up Girls' dismal performance, he decides to offer his services to Green Leaves Entertainment at no charge in exchange for total control as manager, without intervention from Junko or Kohei. Under Tasuku's control, the girls engage in a series of harsh training and a grueling performance schedule. Tasuku has gone so far as to consider removing Airi from the group or disband the group entirely if they choose to keep Airi as a means of testing the girls' commitment and unity. He is also the composer of the songs both WUG and I-1 perform during the Idol festival. He appears to really care for WUG as he was shown to be happy with their performance during said festival (and the crowd's reaction to it) as well as disappointed when they didn't win.

=== Other characters ===
Twinkle
A successful singer–songwriter duo composed of Karina (Haruka Tomatsu) and Anna (Kana Hanazawa), whom Junko helped in boosting their careers. They're responsible for writing some of the songs for the Wake Up Girls to sing.
Kuniyoshi Ōta (大田 邦良, Ōta Kuniyoshi)
Voiced by: Hiro Shimono
A long-time fan of the I-1 Club. He attended the Wake Up Girls' first concert and discovered Mayu as one of the members, reporting it later in social media. He continues to watch the girls' performances as well as comments made in social media. He later assembles a small group to support WUG as their popularity grew and often holds loud meetings in restaurants much to the disturbance of the other customers and waitresses.

== Media ==
=== Social game ===
An idol-training simulation social game titled Wake Up, Girls! Stage no Tenshi (Wake Up, Girls! ステージの天使; lit. "Stage Angels") launched in December 2013. In the game, the player takes the role of manager and must train the girls on their way to stardom. The game features unique idols not present in the anime.

The game was discontinued on December 15, 2014.

=== Anime ===
The first film, titled Wake Up, Girls! – Seven Idols (Wake Up, Girls! 7人のアイドル), was released in theaters on January 11, 2014. Box office is under ¥10 million(JPY). The television series aired between January 11, 2014, and March 29, 2014. The final volume of the series was released on August 22, 2014, and sold 2,193 copies. The opening theme of the first two episodes is Stand Up! (タチアガレ！, Tachiagare!), and from episode 3 onwards is 7 Girls' War, both credited by the cast of Wake Up, Girls!. The ending theme is Kotonoha Aoba (言の葉 青葉), also performed by Wake Up, Girls!.

An original net animation spin-off produced by Studio Moriken, titled Wake Up, Girl ZOO! (うぇいくあっぷがーるZOO！), began streaming on Avex's YouTube channel from September 5, 2014. The main theme is "WUG Zoo Zoo" by Wake Up, Girls!.

A second film, Wake Up, Girls! Seishun no Kage (Wake Up, Girls! 青春の影; lit. "Shadow of Youth"), was released in theaters on October 30, 2015. The box office return was under ¥10 million (JPY). It sold 1,416 copies on DVD and Blu-ray. The third film, Wake Up, Girls! Beyond the Bottom, was released in theaters on January 29, 2016, and had a box office return below ¥10 million (JPY); it sold 1,862 copies on DVD and Blu-ray.

At the "Wake Up, Girls! Festa 2016 Super Live" event on December 11, 2016, a new anime series titled Wake Up, Girls! New Chapter! (Wake Up, Girls！新章, Wake Up, Girls! Shin Shō) was announced to be in production; the series aired from October 2017 to January 2018, on TV Tokyo.

==== Episode list ====
===== Original anime series =====
No.	Title	Original release date
1	"A Quiet Beginning" "Shizukanaru Shidō" (静かなる始動)	January 11, 2014
On Christmas 2013, the new idol group "Wake Up, Girls!" performed their debut concert on an outdoor stage in a small park in Sendai. However, their agency's president Tange disappeared with the company's money. The remaining manager Matsuda was at a loss, and the seven members were uncertain of their group's future.
2	"Girls Standing Onstage" "Sutēji o Fumu Shōjo-tachi" (ステージを踏む少女たち)	January 19, 2014
WUG resumes activity thanks to a Producer Sudo brought in by Matsuda. However, the job involved wearing risque swimsuits at a health spa. Despite their doubts about the obviously shady Sudo, the girls resolve to stand onstage, but the requirements continue to escalate.
3	"Kindest" "Ichiban Yasashiku" (一番優しく)	January 25, 2014
The missing President Tange returns to Green Leaves, and WUG resumes activity in earnest. The president secures a 3 minute weather report and gourmet report mini-corner on a variety show for the girls. The members split into two groups to work on their segments, and Minami's eating habits attract attention.
4	"Scandal" "Sukyandaru" (スキャンダル)	February 1, 2014
Following their TV program, WUG makes smooth progress on the road to idoldom by appearing on a radio program and beginning work on their second song. However, as word of their activity spreads, people begin sharing less than kind words about former I-1 Club member Mayu.
5	"Heaven or Hell" "Tengoku ka Jigoku ka" (天国か地獄か)	February 8, 2014
With their second song complete, WUG prepares for their second concert. However, WUG's concert falls on the same day as the I-1 Club's Sendai Theater opening concert. The town is painted in the colors of the I-1 Club and WUG is overwhelmed by the idol group's power, but the girls put their best efforts into their lessons and advertise their own concert.
6	"Not Yet" "Madamada dayo" (まだまだだよ)	February 15, 2014
Music Producer Hayasaka suddenly reaches out to Green Leaves. While he was one of the people responsible for raising the I-1 Club to stardom and continues working with them, he now wants to produce WUG!
7	"Wonderful Friends" "Subarashiki Nakama-tachi" (素晴らしき仲間たち)	February 22, 2014
Hayasaka announces his decision to remove Airi from WUG! and threatens to fire the remaining members if they do not agree.
8	"Commotion" "Haran" (波乱)	March 1, 2014
WUG! enters the annual Idol Festival in which idol groups from across the country compete to be crowned number one. When they learn the winning team will receive a contract with a mainstream record label, the members feel motivated.
9	"Living Here" "Koko de Ikiru" (ここで生きる)	March 8, 2014
When Yoshino's reservations towards Mayu's resistance to talking about her past with I-1 boils over and a dark cloud hangs over the group, WUG takes a trip at Kaya's suggestion.
10	"Gateway to Success" "Tōryūmon" (登竜門)	March 15, 2014
The Tohoku preliminaries of the Idol Festival approach. As everything from orthodox to unique idol groups enter the competition, President Tange asks the girls what it means to be WUG.
11	"Idol Rhapsody" "Aidoru Rapusodī" (アイドル狂詩曲(ラプソディー))	March 22, 2014
Do to unexpected events, WUG is forced to learn a new song with no time remaining. Not only that, but the song and choreography are far more difficult than the songs they've done before.
12	"No Regrets in This Moment" "Kono Isshun ni Kui Nashi" (この一瞬に悔いなし)	March 29, 2014
As their performance approaches, Mayu and the others notice something is wrong with Yoshino. WUG can't conceal their panic when a problem develops just before they go onstage.

===== Wake Up, Girls! New Chapter =====
The opening theme is "7 Senses" and the ending theme is "Shizuku no Kan" (雫の冠, Drop's Crown); both are performed by the voice acting unit Wake Up, Girls! (made up of the series' main cast).

No.	Title	Original release date
1	"We Are Wake Up, Girls!" "Watashi-tachi, Wake Up, Girls! Dēsu!" (私たち、Wake Up, Girls!でーす！)	October 9, 2017
2	"This Is Our Home" "Koko ga Watashi-tachi no Hōmu" (ここが私たちのホーム)	October 16, 2017
3	"I Am My Ponytail" "Ponītēru wa hontai desu" (ポニーテールは本体です)	October 23, 2017
4	"When It's Tasty, It's Tasty, Meow" "Oishī toki wa un me nya!" (美味しい時はうんめーにゃー!)	October 30, 2017
5	"Dreaming the Same Dream" "Onaji yume o miteru" (同じ夢を見てる)	November 6, 2017
6	"WUG Alone, WUG Together" "Ichi nin demo WUG! nana nin demo WUG!" (1人でもWUG!7人でもWUG!)	November 13, 2017
6.5	"Special Show - WUGBAN! New Chapter" "Tokubetsu hen waguban! Shin shō" (特別篇 わぐばん！新章)	November 20, 2017
7	"When the Going Gets Tough, Smile" "Kitsui toki hodo waratte nanbo" (キツい時ほど笑ってナンボ)	November 27, 2017
8	"Believe You're Making Progress" "Susun deru tte shinji te" (進んでるって信じて)	December 4, 2017
9	"WUG! Makes Me Think Of...?" "WUG! to ieba......?" (WUG！と言えば……？)	December 11, 2017
10	"Sprout New Buds!" "Shinme o dase!" (新芽を出せ！)	December 18, 2017
11	"What We Can Do!" "Watashi-tachi ni dekiru koto" (私たちにできること)	December 25, 2017
12	"Towards the Light" "Akarui hō e" (明るい方へ)	January 7, 2018

== Voice actress unit ==
=== Wake Up, Girls! ===
Wake Up, Girls!
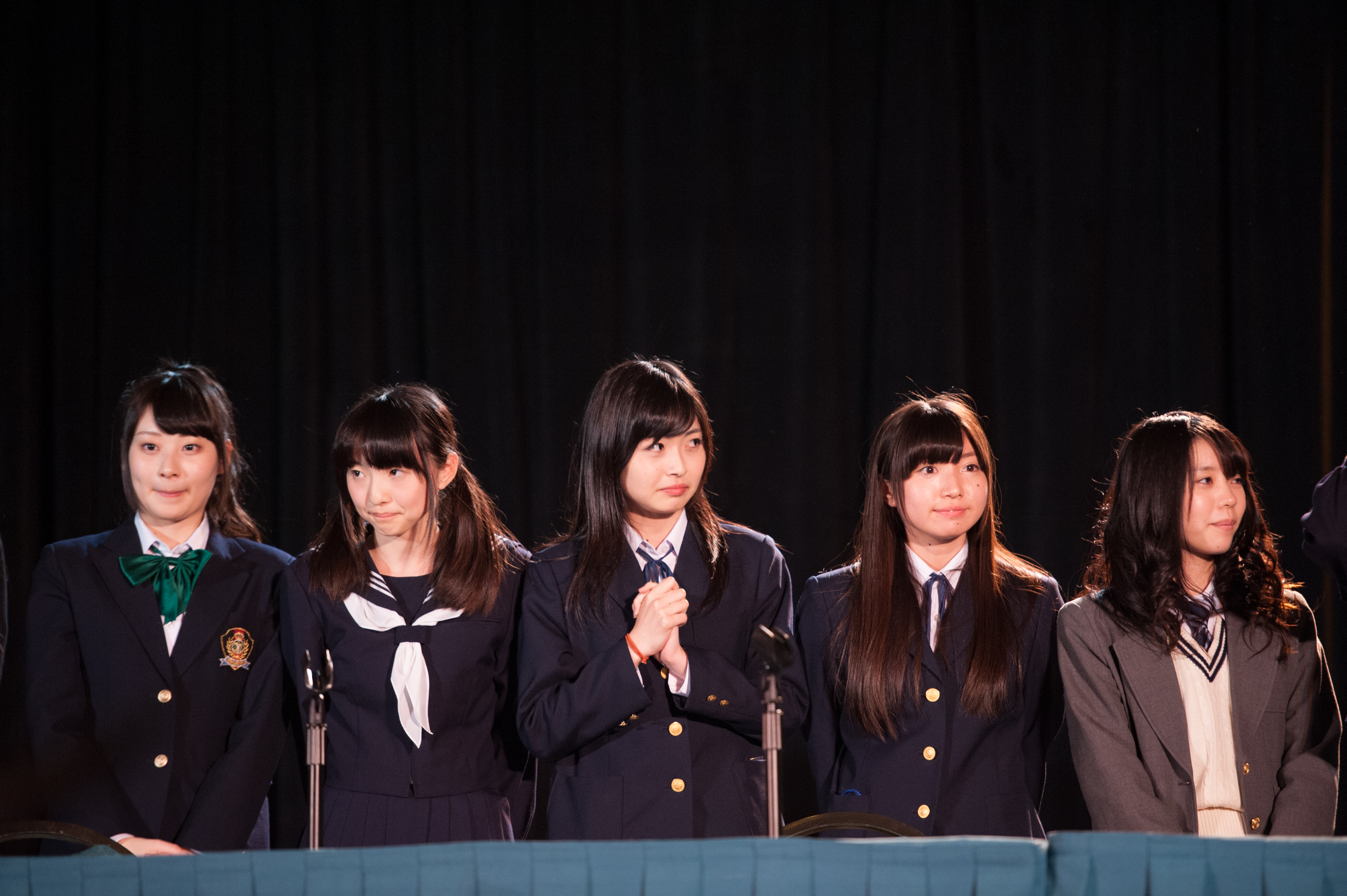
- Wake Up, Girls! cast members at Anime Central 2014

Background information
- Origin: Japan
- Genres: J-pop, Anisong
- Years active: 2013–2019
- Labels: Avex Group; 81 Produce
- Past members: Mayu Yoshioka; Airi Eino; Minami Tanaka; Yoshino Aoyama; Nanami Yamashita; Kaya Okuno; Miyu Takagi
- Website: wug-portal.jp

Wake Up, Girls! was also a voice acting unit formed of the series' main cast; Mayu Yoshioka, Airi Eino, Minami Tanaka, Yoshino Aoyama, Nanami Yamashita, Kaya Okuno, and Miyu Takagi. Their first single outside of the Wake Up, Girls! anime franchise is the ending theme for the 2016 anime television series, Scorching Ping Pong Girls. On June 15, 2018, it was announced that the unit would disband after their last concert on March 8, 2019.

=== Run Girls, Run! ===
Run Girls, Run! is a voice acting unit derived from the unit sharing the same name casting in Wake Up, Girls! New Chapter started in 2017: Coco Hayashi, Yuuka Morishima and Nanami Atsugi. They cast in Wake Up, Girls! series initially, while their first single has a collaboration with the opening theme of Death March to the Parallel World Rhapsody.
