= List of Nyaruko: Crawling with Love episodes =

Nyaruko: Crawling with Love is a Japanese anime television series based on the light novels by Manta Aisora. The story revolves around a Nyarlathotep known as Nyaruko who is sent to Earth to protect the human boy, Mahiro Yasaka. The animated part of the franchise consists of two flash anime series produced by DLE and an anime television series by Xebec.

The flash series consist of an original video animation series titled Haiyoru! Nyaruani (這いよる！ニャルアニ), which was released between October 23, 2009, and March 15, 2010, and a television sequel series titled Haiyoru! Nyaruani: Remember My Mr. Lovecraft (這いよる！ニャルアニ リメンバー・マイ・ラブ(クラフト先生), Haiyoru! Nyaruani Rimenbā Mai Rabu(kurafuto-sensei)), which aired in Japan from December 10, 2010, to February 25, 2011. The Xebec animated anime television series, titled Nyarko-san: Another Crawling Chaos (這いよれ！ニャル子さん, Haiyore! Nyaruko-san), aired on TV Tokyo between April 10 and June 26, 2012. All three series are being streamed by Crunchyroll since 2012, and Nyarko-san: Another Crawling Chaos was simulcast.

The opening theme for the OVA flash series is "Like, Like, Love" (好き、好き、大好き。, Suki, Suki, Daisuki.) by Kana Asumi, whilst the ending theme for the second flash series is "The Catharsis of a Woman's Love" (恋する乙女のカタルシス, Koisuru Otome no Katarushisu) by LISP. For the 2012 anime television series, the opening theme is "The Sun Says "Burn, Chaos" (太陽曰く燃えよカオス, Taiyō Iwaku Moeyo Kaosu) by Kana Asumi, Miyu Matsuki and Yuka Ōtsubo (the voices of Nyaruko, Kuuko, and Kurei respectively) whilst the ending theme is "Always Be With You" (ずっと Be with you, Zutto Be with you) by Kana Asumi for the first 11 episodes and "Magamagashiku mo Seinaru kana" (禍々しくも聖なるかな) by Asumi, Matsuki, and Ōtsubo for the final, 12th. A 10-minute original episode on DVD was offered for buying all of the TV anime series Blu-ray Disc or DVD volumes.

A second season called Nyarko-san: Another Crawling Chaos W (這いよれ！ニャル子さんW, Haiyore! Nyaruko-san Daburu) aired in Japan between April 8 and July 1, 2013, on TV Tokyo and was streamed with English subtitles by Crunchyroll. The second season used the song "Koi wa Chaos no Shimobenari" (恋は渾沌の隷也) by Ushiro kara Haiyori-tai G (Kana Asumi, Miyu Matsuki and Yuka Ōtsubo) as an opening theme and six different songs as ending themes. An original episode on DVD was released for buying all of the second season's Blu-ray Disc or DVD volumes.

== Episode list ==
=== Haiyoru! Nyaruani (2009) ===
No.	Title	Original release date
1	"Inspection"; Transliteration: "Kentei" (Japanese: けんてい)	October 23, 2009
2	"Loyalty"; Transliteration: "Chūseishin" (Japanese: 忠誠心)	TBA
3	"Hug Pillow"; Transliteration: "Dakimakura" (Japanese: 抱きまくら)	TBA
4	"Gal Game"; Transliteration: "Gyaru Gē" (Japanese: ギャルゲー)	TBA
5	"RPG"	TBA
6	"Continue?"; Transliteration: "Tsuzuku?" (Japanese: つづく?)	TBA
7	"Cooking"; Transliteration: "Kukkingu" (Japanese: クッキング)	TBA
8	"An Untouchable Sanctuary"; Transliteration: "Fure Ezaru Seiiki" (Japanese: 触れ得ざる聖域)	TBA
9	"First Love"; Transliteration: "Hatsukoi" (Japanese: 初恋)	March 15, 2010

=== Haiyoru! Nyaruani: Remember My Mr. Lovecraft (2010) ===
No.	Title	Original air date
1	"Because I'm Not a Person"; Transliteration: "Hito ja Arimasen kara" (Japanese: 人じゃありませんから)	December 11, 2010
2	"Endless Christmas"; Transliteration: "Endoresu Kurisumasu" (Japanese: エンドレス クリスマス)	December 18, 2010
3	"To the Market"; Transliteration: "Iza Sokubaikai e" (Japanese: いざ 即売会へ)	December 25, 2010
4	"Mahiro, My First Naked Apron!"; Transliteration: "Mahiro, Hajimete no Hadaka Epuron!" (Japanese: 真尋、はじめての裸エプロン!)	January 8, 2011
5	"Nyaruko and Mahiro's Love-Love Hot Spring Trip"; Transliteration: "Nyaruko to Mahiro no Raburabu Yukemuri Onsen Ryokō" (Japanese: ニャル子と真尋のラブラブ湯けむり温泉旅行)	January 15, 2011
6	"Buried Alive"; Transliteration: "Ikiume" (Japanese: 生き埋め)	January 22, 2011
7	"Mushroom Master"; Transliteration: "Kinoko Masutā" (Japanese: きのこマスター)	January 29, 2011
8	"Content to Be Decided"; Transliteration: "Naiyō Mitei" (Japanese: 内容未定)	February 5, 2011
9	"How He Came to Love the Girl Despite Being a Normal High School Student Who Cannot Even Sense in the Slightest That the Universe Is at Risk of Destruction, and Suppresses a Vague Worry That Tomorrow the Sun May Not Rise from the Same Direction or at the Same Speed or Even Shine at the Same Luminance and Follow the Same Orbit"; Transliteration: "Gingakei o Horoboshi Kanenai Kiki ga Semarikita tote, Sore o Mushi no Shirase Hodo ni Kanji Toru Koto mo Kanawanai Ikkai Kōkōsei dearu Mahiro ni Totte Ashita no Taiyō ga Kanarazushimo Itsumo to Onaji Hōgaku kara Onaji Sokudo de Onaji Kiseki o Tadotte Nobori Onaji Kido de Kagayaku nante Hoshō wa Doko ni mo Nai no da to Iu Bakuzen to Shita Fuan o Kanjiru Koto Sae Toki wa Kanjō o Oshinagashi Shōnen wa Ika ni Shite Shinpai Suru Koto o Yamete Shōjo o Aisuru Yō ni Natta ka" (Japanese: 銀河系を滅ぼし兼ねない危機が迫り来たとて、それを虫の知らせ程に感じとることも適わない一介の高校生である真尋にとって明日の太陽が必ずしもいつもと同じ方角から同じ速度で同じ軌跡を辿って昇り同じ輝度で輝くなんて保証は何処にもないのだという漠然とした不安を感じることさえ時は感情を押し流し少年は如何にして心配することをやめて少女を愛するようになったか)	February 12, 2011
10	"Content to Be Decided"; Transliteration: "Naiyō Mitei" (Japanese: 内容未定)	February 19, 2011
11	"Remember My Love"; Transliteration: "Rimenbā Mai Rabu" (Japanese: リメンバー・マイ・ラブ)	February 26, 2011

==== OVA (2011) ====
No.	Title	Original release date
OVA–2011	"Just Like a Sequel"; Transliteration: "Gojitsudan-teki na" (Japanese: 後日談的な)	March 15, 2011
A DVD Special of Haiyoru! Nyaruani: Remember My Love(craft-sensei) which is also episode 12 of the series and takes place after the last episode of the anime. This was not televised.

=== Nyarko-san: Another Crawling Chaos (2012) ===
No.	Title	Original release date
1	"Like a Close Encounter of the Third Kind"; Transliteration: "Dai-san-shu Sekkin Sōgū, teki na" (Japanese: 第三種接近遭遇、的な)	April 10, 2012
2	"Goodbye, Nyaruko"; Transliteration: "Sayōnara Nyaruko-san" (Japanese: さようならニャル子さん)	April 17, 2012
Nyaruko believes it's time to invade the headquarters of the culprit located in the city of R'lyeh operated as a theme park. Arriving inside a black castle in the center of an arena they are approached by Nodens, the boss. However, they also confronted by someone from Nyaruko's past, Cthugha, "The Living Flame" and her sworn rival. Fighting Cthugha in another dimension, surprisingly she reveals to have complex feelings for Nyaruko which greatly annoys her. Nyaruko transforms her body in black armor thus returning through a box she had given to Mahiro. Backing Nodens in a corner, he says that Mahiro was chosen to be part of a TV drama, having Mahiro command Nyaruko to punish him. Nyaruko remains with Mahiro due to her infatuation for him.
3	"Mahiro Yasaka Wants To Live in Peace"; Transliteration: "Yasaka Mahiro wa Shizuka ni Kurashitai" (Japanese: 八坂真尋は静かに暮らしたい)	April 24, 2012
Continue resisting Nyaruko's flirting that Mahiro has to put up with, Cthugha also transfers to their classroom nicknamed Kuuko, increasing Mahiro's inconvenient. Meanwhile, Nyaruo (Nyaruko's hopeless older brother) sends in nightgaunts to seek revenge, but turns out unsuccessful.
4	"Mothers Attack!!"; Transliteration: "Mazāzu Atakku!" (Japanese: マザーズ・アタック！)	May 1, 2012
Mahiro's mother Yoriko returns and reveals her secret to her son after finding Nyaruko and Kuuko there. Meanwhile, a small boy Hastur (known as Hasuta) comes to the Earth to look for someone that will help his father for unknown reasons.
5	"Conspiracy of the Big X"; Transliteration: "Ōinaru X no Inbō" (Japanese: 大いなるXの陰謀)	May 8, 2012
Hasuta and Mahiro meet and learns the person he's looking for is his mother. Yoriko is kidnapped by a mysterious woman for some unknown purpose. Kuuko is also blackmailed into helping her. Mahiro, Nyaruko and Hasuta set out to R'lyeh again to rescue them. During the events, Mahiro and Hasuta have a series of awkward moments. Traveling in an underwater submarine and avoiding obstacles they reached their destination.
6	"The War in the Market"; Transliteration: "Māketto no Naka no Sensō" (Japanese: マーケットの中の戦争)	May 15, 2012
Nyaruko is left fighting Kuuko. Mahiro finds that his mother was kidnapped for her expertise with game consoles to produce more entertainment by Luhy Distone for her employment. Turns out Hasuta's father also wanted Yoriko for his rival game company he runs in space. However the situation ended up being more messed up than it seems. Hasuta decides to enroll at Mahiro's school too. Afterwards, the gang goes to the beach and hot springs where Nyaruko makes another attempt to seduce Mahiro.
7	"Blue Coral Reef"; Transliteration: "Aoi SANgoshō" (Japanese: 碧いSAN瑚礁)	May 22, 2012
Nyaruko is finally granted permission by Yoriko to date Mahiro; since she did so much to save them in the days prior to their trip, but after being too clingy with Mahiro he suddenly snaps and tells her that he doesn't like her. Feeling bad about devastating her and after some prodding by Yoriko; Mahiro offers to take her on a date, eventually the two end up on the beach at sunset.
8	"Nyaruko's Exciting High School"; Transliteration: "Nyaruko no Dokidoki Haisukūru" (Japanese: ニャル子のドキドキハイスクール)	May 29, 2012
After Nyaruko sincerely confesses her love to Mahiro on the beach; Mahiro finds his thoughts in a haze as the group goes souvenir shopping. Mahiro finds a curious game console in one of the shops and after turning the system on finds himself trapped in a Dating-Sim where he is the protagonist; in order to escape he must get a good ending with either Nyaruko, Tamao Kurei, Cthugha, or Hasuta. The ending scenario was flagged with Mahiro and Nyaruko's kiss, returning to the real world with no memory except Mahiro.
9	"I'm Him and He's Me!"; Transliteration: "Boku ga Aitsu de Aitsu ga Boku de" (Japanese: 僕があいつであいつが僕で)	June 5, 2012
Mahiro and Nyaruko accidentally switched bodies by a representative of "Dreamland". The representative, Isuka, who is currently using Tamao's body asked for help from Nyaruko in search for an enemy group known be the extremists. The next day having Mahiro's body for advantage, "Mahiro" utterly confesses his love to "Nyaruko" in the front of the class.
10	"The Ruler of Super Time-Space"; Transliteration: "Chōjikū no Hasha" (Japanese: 超時空の覇者)	June 12, 2012
An enemy of the future is trying to destroy Earth, Nyaruko and the others must fight the enemy under their "certain" situation. Finding Takehiko Yoichi who is being controlled by an extremist inadvertently invents a device for the boss as to destroy Earth's entertainment believing it violates the "decency law" for children. With their own bodies back, Nyaruko defeats the enemy. Things were back to normal but, the school still remains concern about the awkward deeds.
11	"Lost Girl from the Stars"; Transliteration: "Hoshi kara Otozureta Mayoigo" (Japanese: 星から訪れた迷い子)	June 19, 2012
Because of Nyaruko's kiss attack on Mahiro, he finds it hard to ever have a quiet life again. Yoriko dropped off a lost rich deity girl named Ghutatan and her butler Lloigor at Mahiro's home, which causes problems for Nyaruko and the others. Seeing Ghutatan as a sister figure, Mahiro protects her from a gang of Shoggoth but appraises Nyaruko of her job. Ghutatan questions Mahiro about loneliness.
12	"He Waits Dreaming"; Transliteration: "Yume Miru Mama ni Machiitari" (Japanese: 夢見るままに待ちいたり)	June 26, 2012
Mahiro is trapped in a time loop and there seems to be no one around. Reminiscing all the fun things he had with Nyaruko and the others, he realized he truly wants them by his side. It is then revealed that his partners are trapped in a mirror and Mahiro is petrified by Lloigor, who is revealed to be evil and the one who orchestrated the Shoggoth; forcing Ghutatan to grant Mahiro's wish to live alone and steal Earth's entertainment and adult games. The gang must defeat Lloigor once and for all. In conclusion, life goes back to normal with Ghutatan apologizing to Mahiro. The friends serve a barbecue.

==== OVA (2012) ====
No.	Title	Original release date
OVA–2012	"A Kind Way to Kill Enemies"; Transliteration: "Yasashii Teki no Shitome-kata" (Japanese: やさしい敵の仕留め方)	November 23, 2012
Mahiro gets Luhy to train Nyaruko to become a magical girl in the hopes her dealing with enemies would be less chaotic.

=== Nyarko-san: Another Crawling Chaos W (2013) ===
No.	Title	Ending theme	Original air date
1	"Attack on Evil Deity"; Transliteration: "Shingeki no Jashin" (Japanese: 進撃の邪神)	"Yotte S.O.S." (よってS.O.S) by RAMM ni Haiyoru Nyaruko-san (Kana Asumi)	April 8, 2013
2	"Celaeno Library War"; Transliteration: "Seraeno Toshokan Sensō" (Japanese: セラエノ図書館戦争)	"Yotte S.O.S."	April 15, 2013
The group travels to the Celaeno Library to return Nyaruko's overdo library book. While there they encounter robbers who are looking for something. They engage them in combat and are soundly beat until reinforcements arrive, forcing the robbers to retreat. Heading to the Isle of Stars, the group prepares for a rematch.
3	"Super Deity Apocalypse"; Transliteration: "Chō Jashin Mokushiroku" (Japanese: 超邪神黙示録)	"Wonder Nanda? Kataomoi" (Wonderナンダ？片思い) by RAMM ni Haiyoru Jashin-san (Asumi, Miyu Matsuki, and Rie Kugimiya)	April 22, 2013
What they were looking for turns out to be the book Mahiro accidentally steals from the library. The robbers utilize both the pen they found earlier and the book to summon a "Great Ape." Nyaruko and Kukko are unable to beat it by themselves so Hasuta has to reveal his true form. Even the three of them together, though, are unable to beat it. The episode comes to an anticlimactic close when Mahiro simply erases the writing in the book to destroy the monster.
4	"Talent at Love"; Transliteration: "Ren'ai no Sainō" (Japanese: 恋愛の才能)	"Kiraina Wake Lychee" (嫌いなワケLychee) by RAMM ni Haiyoru Tamao-san (Yuka Ōtsubo)	April 29, 2013
5	"Say It Isn't So, Kuuko"; Transliteration: "Uso dato Itteyo Kūko" (Japanese: 嘘だと言ってよクー子)	"Sister, Friend, Lover" by RAMM ni Haiyoru Kūko-san to Kūne-san (Matsuki and Ryōka Yuzuki)	May 6, 2013
6	"I'll Try to Act it Out"; Transliteration: "Enjite Miru" (Japanese: エンジテミル)	"Yotte S.O.S."	May 13, 2013
7	"Color the Pool Red with Blood"; Transliteration: "Pūrusaido o Chi ni Somete" (Japanese: プールサイドを血に染めて)	"Kiraina Wake Lychee"	May 27, 2013
8	"A Little Love Song"; Transliteration: "Chiisana Koi no Uta" (Japanese: 小さな恋のうた。)	"Wonder Nanda? Kataomoi"	June 3, 2013
9	"High School of the Heat"; Transliteration: "Hai Sukūru Obu za Hīto" (Japanese: ハイスクール・オブ・ザ・ヒート)	"Sister, Friend, Lover"	June 10, 2013
10	"Yuggoth Attacks!"; Transliteration: "Yugosu Atakku!" (Japanese: ユゴス・アタック！)	"Ai Crusaders†Striver" (愛クルセイダース†ストライバー) by RAMM ni Haiyoru Mahiro-san to Yoichi-san (Eri Kitamura and Wataru Hatano)	June 17, 2013
11	"A Certain Camp's Haunted House"; Transliteration: "Toaru Kyanpu no Akuryō no Ie" (Japanese: とあるキャンプの悪霊の家)	"Yotte S.O.S."	June 24, 2013
12	"Goodbye, Nyaruko-san W"; Transliteration: "Sayōnara Nyaruko-san W" (Japanese: さようならニャル子さんW)	"Kimi no Tonari de" (キミのとなりで; Right Next to You) by RAMM ni Haiyoru Nyaruko-san (Kana Asumi)	July 1, 2013

==== OVA (2014) ====
No.	Title	Ending theme	Original release date
OVA–2014	"Goodbye to W / The Chaos of Love in this Hot Spring"; Transliteration: "W ni Sayōnara/ Kono Onsen ni Koi no Konton o" (Japanese: Wにさよなら / この温泉に恋の渾沌を)	"Yotte S.O.S."	April 1, 2014

=== Nyarko-san: Another Crawling Chaos F (2015) ===
No.	Title	Opening theme	Ending theme	Original release date
OVA–2015	"Haiyoru, Switch-on! Chaos Incoming!"; Transliteration: "Haiyoru Suitchi On, Konton Kitā!" (Japanese: 這いよるスイッチオン、渾沌 キタ─！)	Haiyore Once Nyagain (這いよれOnce Nyagain) by Ushiro kara Haiyori-tai G (Kana Asumi, Miyu Matsuki and Yuka Ōtsubo)	Kitto Engēji (きっとエンゲージ) by RAMM ni Haiyoru Nyaruko-san (Kana Asumi)	June 19, 2015
As Mahiro tries to understand his recent dream, where he and Nyaruko are wedded, Tamao soon invites everyone to check out a new attraction that has opened in town. But after everyone traverses and goes about the rest of the day, Nyaruko and Mahiro find themselves trapped by an unknown enemy that has replaced their real selves with alien impostors and forces them to try and escape while a deadly space-nano virus has infiltrated Nyaruko's body, taking away her powers and slowly saps away her memories. Their friends soon realize the switch and defeat the fakes before going back to find the real ones. Still trapped, Nyaruko's personality soon starts to fade as Mahiro risks his own safety to protect her. Having reached the end of the challenge but have run out of time, Mahiro begs the mysterious voice to return Nyaruko to remember in exchange for agreeing to aide him. However, Nyaruko, with what little memories she has left, persuades Mahiro to stay himself as she admits that she will never forget how much she truly loves him. This brings Mahiro to tears as he confirms her feelings with a kiss. Soon after, they are ejected from their prison and back into the real world with Nyaruko's original personality intact but with their memories of that day erased. However, a letter found later in Mahiro's school bag reveals it was Mahiro sharing a kiss with her that cured Nyaruko's condition, written as "sharing bodily fluids". This stuns and shocks everyone else around him, as the others were nearby when he read the letter, before Nyaruko and Mahiro ends the special with one last kiss in front of the class.
