= List of Nyaruko: Crawling with Love characters =

The following is a list of characters from the series Nyaruko: Crawling with Love.

== Main characters ==
=== Nyaruko ===
Nyaruko (ニャル子)
Voiced by: Kana Asumi
In the series, Nyaruko is a member of a race of alien known as a Nyarlathotep, which was originally featured in Lovecraft's books as a type of monster. She is sent by an organization called the Space Defence Agency to Earth in order to protect a human named Mahiro Yasaka. Nyaruko quickly falls in love with him though which she refers to as "love at first sight". Her feelings towards Mahiro become serious with her going so far as eventually talking about marriage and a family together. She takes the form of a human girl with long silver-colored hair, but jokingly says to Mahiro that she can change to her original form if he wants her to. In order to blend in she takes the name Nyaruko Yasaka as Mahiro's cousin when staying at Mahiro's house, and attending his school. Her actual age is unknown since she always stops Mahiro whenever he becomes curious or questions her age. When it comes to education she stated to Mahiro that she graduated from one of the best universities at the top of her class, and entered the Space Defense Agency after her exam. Despite her graduation, she joins Mahiro at his school in order to get closer to him. Nyaruko is shown to be highly into gaming, and says that Earth's entertainment is well known to aliens across the universe. While in combat, Mahiro notices that she doesn't hold back when it comes to brutal habits to any hostile aliens. She mainly uses her own form of space CQC close quarter combat weapons while fighting, with her weapon of choice being "Some Kind of Unspeakable Bar Thing". While in full force mode she adorns a black and red helmet with armor that covers her entire body.

=== Mahiro Yasaka ===
Mahiro Yasaka (八坂 真尋, Yasaka Mahiro)
Voiced by: Eri Kitamura
A human boy who reluctantly finds himself under the protection of Nyaruko. He tends to attack aliens by stabbing or throwing forks whenever they make him angry. He appears to attack so fast that currently no alien has been able to dodge yet. At first he dislikes aliens and wants to kick them out, but as the story progresses he starts to become more tolerant toward their actions. He is attracted to Nyaruko (in her human form), but is put off by her aggressive advances at the same time. He has also kissed her a few times, the most prominent being their on-screen kiss during the events of the final OVA, Nyaruko F. According to Nyaruko and Kūko, Mahiro's appearance is strangely attractive to aliens, which explains why Nyaruko falls in love with him after only looking at his profile, as well as why alien criminals wanted to kidnap him.

=== Kūko ===
Kūko (クー子)
Voiced by: Miyu Matsuki
A female Cthughan (alien from Cthugha). She takes the form of a slender, red-haired girl. She is in love with Nyaruko despite that her race is the archnemesis of Nyarlathotepians, and appears to be clingy. She is hostile toward Mahiro and threatens him to stay away from Nyaruko in the beginning of the story. As the story progress, she becomes more friendly towards him. She transfers to Mahiro's school and takes the name Kūko Yasaka. She is also obsessed with otaku culture and video games. Kūko was Nyaruko and Hasuta's space elementary school classmate and appears to at the same age as them, although she became a NEET after graduating from high school, and become a Space Defense Agency agent and colleague to Nyaruko later by using the relationship of her uncle who is an employee in the human resource department of the Space Defence Agency. She concealed her feelings for Nyaruko from her family and lied to them that Mahiro is her fiance, as love between Nyarlathotep and Cthugha are considered a shame of the family among Cthughans, however she has displayed having feelings for Mahiro. She possess the power of fire, able to control fireballs, heat, or drones that fire lasers; she refers to them as space CQC - Cthugha version. Her strength in combat is lower than that of Nyaruko's. Her combat form is covering her lower body with red fire patterns.

=== Hasuta ===
Hasuta (ハス太)
Voiced by: Rie Kugimiya, Tomokazu Seki (young man)
A male Hasturan (alien from Hastur) who was the space elementary school classmate of Nyaruko and Kūko. He is the son of the owner of CCE (Carcosa Computer Entertainment, parody of Sony Computer Entertainment), a famous video game company in space. He was first sent to get intel of Earth's entertainment from Yoriko, but he failed and decided to stay on Earth, and was later hired as an agent of the Space Defense Agency and colleague to Nyaruko and Kūko. He has feelings for Mahiro and enrolls in Mahiro's school under the name Hasuta Yasaka. He possesses the power of air, fights by creating strong wind, vacuum blades, or forming nearby vacuum areas around enemies. He is the one who always stopped Nyaruko and Kūko's fights during space elementary school, so at least then he was stronger than either. His normal form appears to be obedient, shy, and can be easily mistaken for a young girl, but when switched to power form he will change to a more mature personality and appearance.

== Humans ==
=== Yoriko Yasaka ===
Yoriko Yasaka (八坂 頼子, Yasaka Yoriko)
Voiced by: Kikuko Inoue (drama CD), Aya Hisakawa (anime)
Mahiro's mother, a real monster hunter who started her career during college. She has a young appearance that makes it hard to believe that she has a son in high school. She conceals her true job from her son until returning home during the plot. She is kind to friendly aliens, accepting Nyaruko, Kūko, and Hasuta living in the house, and their actions to pursue Mahiro. She advises Nyaruko to take her relationship with Mahiro a bit slower at first, but permits their relationship later after they rescued her. Just like her son, she uses throwing forks as her main weapons, being better skilled and able to carry more "ammo" than him. She is obsessed with video games, buying different game machines whenever she returns home from hunting. She also has a habit of hugging Mahiro, claiming she's replenishing her "son-onium".

=== Takehiko Yoichi ===
Takehiko Yoichi (余市 健彦, Yoichi Takehiko)
Voiced by: Wataru Hatano
Class representative of Mahiro, Nyaruko, Kūko, and Hasuta's class. A friend to Mahiro, often giving him advice in school.

=== Tamao Kurei ===
Tamao Kurei (暮井 珠緒, Kurei Tamao)
Voiced by: Yuka Ōtsubo
Mahiro, Nyaruko, Kūko, and Hasuta's classmate. Nicknamed "Walking Speaker". Very talkative, likes to gather and spread gossip among the class. She became a close friend to Nyaruko and often gives advice for her to pursue Mahiro, despite often feeling depressed as her plans fail. She actually has feelings toward Mahiro, but decided to give up and support Nyaruko since she feels that she is no match for her.

== Aliens ==
=== Kūne ===
Kūne (クー音)
Voiced by: Ryōka Yuzuki
Kūne is a Cthugan and Kūko's cousin (the daughter of Kūko's uncle in HR). Her appearance resembles Kūko's, albeit taller and more endowed. Her personality is described as vulgar by Mahiro. She introduces herself as a member of the Galactic Defense Force tasked with overseeing her cousin's job, while her true intent is to buy otaku-related products. She has feeling toward Kūko, and is also clingy that she treats Kūko similar to how Kūko treats Nyaruko. In order to stop her pursuit, Kūko lied to her and said that she is in love with Mahiro and they are already engaged, which made her very depressed. She looks down on Mahiro because he is not as powerful as the aliens, as well as acting hostile toward Nyaruko, as their races are arch-nemesis. She is also a friend of Luhy Distone.

=== Shantak-kun ===
Shantak-kun (シャンタッ君, Shantakkun)
Voiced by: Tomoko Kaneda (drama CD), Satomi Arai (anime)
Nyaruko's pet. A female shantak (monster in Cthulhu mythos; a bird with a horse's head and a bat's wings). Has many different forms including sizes as tall as a building or as small as a rabbit. Can also turn into different vehicles. According to Nyaruko, the eggs of shantaks are precious and expensive food in space, though Mahiro never accepts to eat them anyway. Nyaruko arrived on Earth by taking a spaceship transformed from Shantak-kun.

=== Luhy Distone ===
Luhy Distone (ルーヒー・ジストーン, Rūhī Jisutōn)
Voiced by: Mariko Kouda
Luhy Distone is a Cthulhi (クトゥルヒ, Kuturuhi), also known as the star-spawn of Cthulhu, who was working at Cthulhu Corp, a space company that produces video games and other entertainment that rivals that of CCE. Like Hasuta, she tried to get intel of Earth's entertainment from Yoriko, while preparing to show the new developed video game platform. The video game platform turns out to be a disaster, being too high-end to ever be affordable to consumers, and is destroyed by Kūko. Luhy was then fired by Cthulhu Corp and became a vendor selling Takoyaki. She starts to have feelings toward Hasuta in the latter part of the story and declares to Mahiro that she will become his opponent.

=== Atko ===
Atko (アト子, Atoko)
Voiced by: Azusa Kataoka
An Atlach-Nachan. Her character design resembles Hatsune Hirasaka from the visual novel Atlach-Nacha; an outfit with a spider motif. (It is named after Clark Ashton Smith's creation Atlach-Nacha, the spider-god from the Cthulhu Mythos.) She has an appearance that is more mature than Nyaruko, Kūko and Hasuta, despite the fact that they are all around the same age.
Atko appears in the 10th light novel. Her family owes the largest Textile manufacturing company in space and she is on a trip to earth to do a research on a new material, and decided to stay in Mahiro's house. She was Nyaruko's classmate and friend in high school, and also Kūko's online friend that makes bodypillow with Nyaruko printing for her. Since high school, she has a bad habit of seducing other girls' boyfriends, as she felt pleasure when doing so, but dumped them once they are separated from their girlfriends. In novel she deliberately hugged Hasuta in front of Luhy to get pleasure from the latter's jealousy. She also states that she will support Nyaruko's pursuit toward Mahiro, and seduce him after they become couple so the guilt of robbing best friend's lover can bring more pleasure to herself. According to her, she can smell the scent of falling in love, and Mahiro has that scent, despite latter's denial. She fights with her own spider silk, web, and poison; according to Nyaruko, she is not as strong as them, but dealing with her attack is troubling.

=== Ghutatan ===
Ghutatan (グタタン, Gutatan)
Voiced by: Shiori Mikami
Only appears in the 2012 anime, Ghutatan comes to Earth from the planet Ghatanothoa for Mahiro to take care of her as if he were babysitting her. She is kind of childish for an alien, as seen in episode 11 when the Nyarlathotepian trio chases Mahiro for her. She has a butler named Roy Fooger the Lloigor. It was revealed that in episode 12 that Lloigor has been using Mahiro so he can bring all of Earth's adult games into space, as Ghutatan has completed her purpose on Earth. After Lloigor is destroyed, Mahiro and the Nyarlathotepian trio wish Ghutatan goodbye as she departs for Ghatanothoa.

=== Isuka ===
Isuka (イス香)
Voiced by: Satomi Arai
A Yithian who swaps bodies with Kurei to stop a group of extremists.

=== Isurugi ===
Isurugi (イス動)
Voiced by: Wataru Hatano
A Yithian extremist who swaps bodies with Yoichi to capture all of Earth's entertainment.

=== Tsuruko ===
Tsuruko (ツル子)
Voiced by: Saki Yamakita
An alien from planet Ut'ulls-Hr'her who enters Earth illegally and has an obsession with Mahiro. She is a doujinshi author who writes manga about Mahiro, who has become famous in space due to Nyaruko's stories. However, she has never met him. She comes to Earth in hopes of meeting him, but always has her hopes somehow dashed at the last moment. She is a fujoshi.

=== N'tse-Kaambl ===
N'tse-Kaambl (ヌトセ＝カアムブル, Nutose Kaanburu)
Voiced by: Yuka Ōtsubo
A member of the Planetary Defense Organization's Dreamlands Management Division.

=== Bast ===
Bast (バースト, Bāsuto)
Voiced by: Wataru Hatano
Another member of the Planetary Defense Organization's Dreamlands Management Division.

== Antagonists ==
=== Nodens ===
Nodens (ノーデンス, Nōdensu)
Voiced by: Bin Shimada
A space smuggler. He attempts to kidnap Mahiro, planning to use him to star in a yaoi film. He sends nightgaunts to attack Mahiro while hiring Kūko as a bodyguard. After he is defeated and reveals his true plan, Mahiro orders Nyaruko to "destroy" him. Note that the name "Nodens" include any alien from Nodens, while this space smuggler is one of them.

=== Nyaruo ===
Nyaruo (ニャル夫)
Voiced by: Takeshi Kusao
Nyaruko's older brother. He has great hatred and jealousy toward Nyaruko since she graduated from one of the best colleges in space as the best of her year, while he dropped out of a third-class college. To seek revenge, he arrived on Earth and killed the gods in Dreamlands. He is defeated by Nyaruko with Shantak-kun in her motorcycle form; in the novel he was run over multiple times in Dreamlands and later taken into custody by the Space Defence Agency; in the anime he is bumped on the leg and sent flying. Nyaruko looks down on him as she calls him a "wild Nyarlathotep" rather than her brother in the story.

=== Lloigor ===
Lloigor (ロイガー, Roigā)
Voiced by: Jōji Nakata
Ghutatan's butler who takes the alias of Roy Fogger. He arrived on Earth for Mahiro to look after Ghutatan, but was later revealed that he was the one who hurt Ghutatan so Nyaruko can fight the monsters. It is also revealed that he blocked the communication between Mahiro and Ghutatan, as seen in episode 11 of the 2012 anime. He then turned out to be an evil monster as of the finale. He wanted to bring all of Earth's entertainment, including eroge, but was unsuccessful and was defeated by Nyaruko.

=== Zhar ===
Zhar (ツァール, Tsāru) and Lloiger (ロイガー, Roigā)
Voiced by: Atsushi Imaruoka and Takamasa Ōhashi
Two deities who attack Celeano library in search of a book. They are later revealed to be environmental extremists who simply want their organization to continue receiving funding by creating new endangered species to protect.

=== Clark Ashton Smith ===
Clark Ashton Smith (クラーク・アシュトン・スミス, Kurāku Ashuton Sumisu)
Voiced by: Kōji Tsujitani
A Cthughan who takes over Mahiro's school in an attempt to better understand Earth's analogue games.

=== Boss Mi-Go ===
Boss Mi-Go
The leader of a group of Mi-Go that land in the Arctic Circle to mine Earth of all its resources. His gang once trampled the Earth in the Mesozoic era. He is shown to be quite clever, having planned for virtually every eventuality but is ultimately defeated by his convenient weakness to music.

== Reception ==
A series of interviews were done with the Japanese cast members in which they talked about the characters they voice. In an interview done with Kana Asumi who plays Nyaruko, she stated that the favorite thing about her character was how she uses her whole body to express her love for Mahiro. Eri Kitamura commented on how her favorite things about Mahiro are how he is earnest, and a Tsundere. Miyu Matsuki commented on Kūko saying she liked how she is single minded, as well as cool and hot. Rie Kugimiya also left a comment about Hasuta liking how he appears shy but is actually pushy.

The characters have also received outside reception from various anime/manga reviewers. Aiden Foote from THEM Anime reviews commented on the first season saying Nyaruko "deserved" better side characters. Mahiro was a big issue for Foote whom he said he wanted to punch in the face for being "obnoxious and uselessly violent". LB Bryant from Japanator also did a review of the first season in which he called the characters "over the top" when it comes to love or hate to the point of them being disliked. Travis Bruno from Capsule Computers gave both seasons reviews and praised the lead character Nyaruko for her personality calling her an "amazing female lead".
