= Nyaruko =

Fictional character in the light novel series Nyaruko: Crawling with Love

- Nyaruko: Crawling with Love character
- Nyaruko as illustrated by Koin
- First appearance: Nyaruko: Crawling with Love volume 1 (April 2009)
- Created by: Manta Aisora; Koin
- Voiced by: Kana Asumi

In-universe information
- Nickname: Crawling Chaos (Note: 這うカオス, Hau Kaosu)
- Species: Alien (Nyarlathotep)
- Gender: Female
- Relatives: Nyaruo (older brother)

Nyaruko (Note: ニャル子) is a fictional character who appears as the main protagonist and title character of the light novel series Nyaruko: Crawling with Love, created by Manta Aisora and Koin. Based on the Nyarlathotep deity first seen in the Cthulhu Mythos described in the books by H. P. Lovecraft, Nyaruko is member of an alien race that served as inspiration for the character in-universe. Taking on the physical look of a silver-haired girl, she is sent to Earth to protect the human Mahiro Yasaka, with whom she falls deeply in love at first sight.

The character has subsequently appeared in all of the series' adaptations, including the anime television series, in which she is voiced by Japanese voice actress Kana Asumi. As one of the most popular characters in the series, Nyaruko has received a mostly positive reception from both fans and critics alike, praising the character for her design and personality.

== Concept and creation ==
The character of Nyaruko was created by Japanese writer Manta Aisora, while her basic design was provided by illustrator Koin. Nyaruko was inspired by Nyarlathotep, a fictional character originally depicted as a malign deity and who was first seen in the shared universe of the Cthulhu Mythos described in the books by H. P. Lovecraft. In January 2014, during an interview, anime director Tsuyoshi Nagasawa expressed his opinion on how the idea of turning a creature from the Cthulhu Mythos into a beautiful, moe girl would probably only be possible in Japanese anime, manga or light novels. When asked whether Nyaruko's ahoge is an appendage, Nagasawa preferred not to answer the question; instead, he quoted an excerpt from Lovecraft's The Call of Cthulhu (1928).

== Appearances ==
=== In Nyaruko: Crawling with Love ===
"I'm the chaos that always crawls up to you with a smile, Nyarlathotep."

— Nyaruko

Nyaruko is the main protagonist and title character of the light novel series Nyaruko: Crawling with Love. She is introduced as a member of an organization called the Space Defence Agency, (Note: 惑星保護機構, Wakusei Hogo Kikō; lit. Planetary Protection Mechanism) which sends her to planet Earth to protect from hostile aliens the human teenage boy Mahiro Yasaka, with whom Nyaruko claims to have fallen in love at first sight just by looking at a picture of him, something that happens before she even meets Mahiro. After arriving on Earth, Nyaruko explains to Mahiro that the creatures from H. P. Lovecraft's works are actually based on real-life alien races, and that she herself is part of one of those races, specifically the one that served as the basis for Nyarlathotep.

In order to blend in on Earth, Nyaruko, possessing the ability to shapeshift at will, assumes the appearance of a long, silver-haired petite human girl whose primarily attire throughout the series is a maid's outfit. To get closer to Mahiro, she adopts the name Nyaruko Yasaka, (Note: 八坂ニャル子, Yasaka Nyaruko) pretending to be his cousin while staying at his house and attending his school as well, despite the fact that Nyaruko has already graduated from one of the best universities in the galaxy. In regards to Nyaruko's romantic feelings for Mahiro, she relentlessly pursues him with the genuine desire to marry him and start a family together, although her advances toward Mahiro simply annoy him and make him want to walk away from Nyaruko.

As the events of the series unfold, more aliens arrive on Earth and become involved in Nyaruko's daily life, such as Kūko (Cthugha), who is in love with her, and Hasuta (Hastur), who is in love with Mahiro; Nyaruko sees both of them as obstacles in the way of her relationship with Mahiro. A running gag in the series is Mahiro's attempts to discover Nyaruko's actual age, something she doesn't want him to find out and is adamant about keeping it a secret. While in combat, Nyaruko adorns a black and red armor that covers her entire body, and she primarily makes use of an extraterrestrial fighting style known as Space CQC, (Note: スペースCQC, Supēsu CQC) based on Earth's common close-quarters combat technique.

=== In other media ===
In addition to the main series, Nyaruko appears in all of the anime and OVA adaptations of the light novel, with Japanese voice actress Kana Asumi responsible for dubbing the character; Nyaruko is present in Haiyoru! Nyaruani (2009), Haiyoru! Nyaruani: Remember My Mr. Lovecraft (2010), Nyarko-san: Another Crawling Chaos (2012), Nyarko-san: Another Crawling Chaos W (2013), and Nyarko-san: Another Crawling Chaos F (2015). Furthermore, she is featured in the manga adaptation of the light novel. Nyaruko also makes an appearance in the visual novel for PlayStation Vita entitled Haiyore! Nyaruko-san Meijōshigatai Game no Yōna Mono, with Asumi reprising her voice role as the character.

== Reception ==
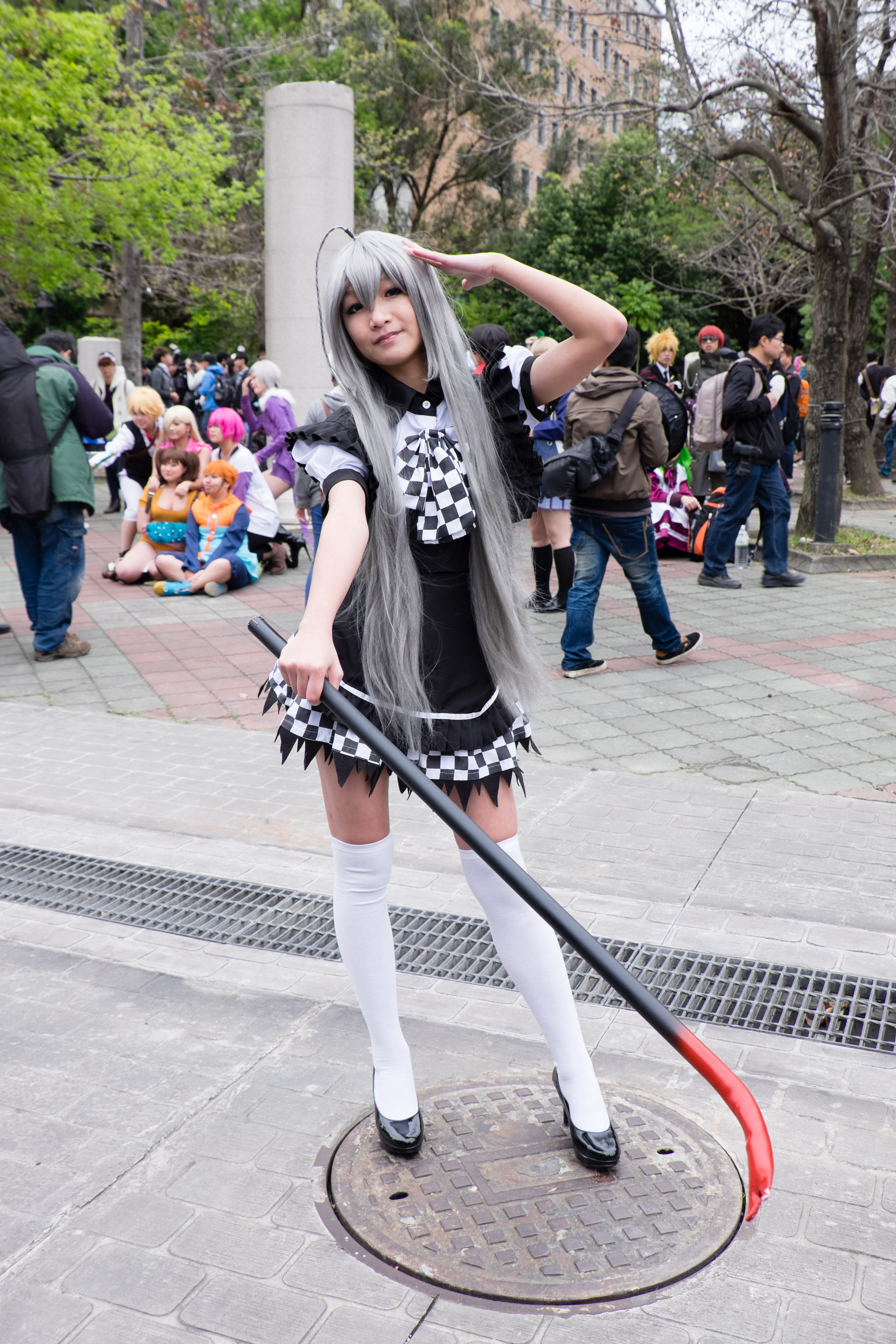
A cosplayer dressed as Nyaruko.

=== Popularity ===
Nyaruko's popularity has made her a frequent subject of cosplay, causing a trend in Japan where female fans of the series attempt to replicate her iconic look. As a result of the series' recognition, there are vehicles in Japan decorated with Nyaruko's image stamped on them. In May 2013, Nyaruko was ranked 7th in the "Top 20 Most Annoying Anime Girls" poll by BIGLOBE. In the same month, Nyaruko came in 8th place in BIGOBLE's "Top Most Hated Anime Heroines" poll by 250 votes. In October 2017, Nyaruko was ranked 8th in the "Top 10 Prettiest Monster Anime Girls" category by Robin Hirsch from the Anime2You website.

=== Critical response ===
Nyaruko has received a generally positive reception among critics. Reviewer Carl Kimlinger of Anime News Network (ANN) reported that Nyaruko is the "ardent alien suitor" of the show. He also commented on how Nyaruko's "ultimate fighting technique" turns her into a sentai hero. Bamboo Dong of ANN wrote, "Nyaruko loves manga and video games, and although she can transform into a Kamen Rider-looking armored person, she typically prefers going around in adorable girl form. Sometimes Nyaruko will hide herself in a self-constructed body pillow and squirm into Mahiro's bed, whereas other times she'll just spring on him in his sleep, or kiss him when he's unconscious."

Aiden Foote of THEM Anime Reviews stated, "Nyaruko as a character is utterly delightful. Her character design is cute and plaudits have to go to ever great Kana Asumi for delivering a character that is infectiously earnest, straightforward and adorably energetic with next to none of the obnoxious baggage that normally comes with such a character." Stig Høgset of THEM Anime Reviews noted that Nyaruko fills the "(realistically) curvy, somewhat oddly-dressed gung-ho" archetype typically seen in anime and manga.

=== Merchandise ===
Several pieces of merchandising action figures based on Nyaruko have been announced. A Nendoroid, a brand of figures manufactured by Good Smile Company that typically feature exchangeable faces and body parts, was released on November 29, 2012, for the price of 3,334 yen. In May 2013, Max Factory announced the launch of a 1/7 scale figure of Nyaruko wearing nothing but an apron. The product, available for the price of 9,333 yen, was launched in October 2013.

== See also ==
- List of Nyaruko: Crawling with Love characters
