= Kaya-chan Isn't Scary =

Japanese manga series by Tarō Yuri

- First tankōbon volume cover, featuring Kaya Satou

カヤちゃんはコワくない (Kaya-chan wa Kowakunai)
- Genre: Action; Comedy Horror
- Manga
- Written by: Tarō Yuri
- Published by: Shinchosha
- English publisher: NA: Seven Seas Entertainment
- Imprint: Bunch Comics
- Magazine: Kurage Bunch
- Original run: April 1, 2022 – present
- Volumes: 9
- Anime television series
- Directed by: Hiroshi Ikehata
- Written by: Shigeru Murakoshi
- Music by: Kohta Yamamoto; Shun Narita
- Studio: East Fish Studio
- Licensed by: Crunchyroll; SEA: Medialink
- Original network: TXN (TV Tokyo), AT-X, WOWOW
- Original run: January 11, 2026 – March 29, 2026
- Episodes: 12
- icon

Kaya-chan Isn't Scary (Japanese: カヤちゃんはコワくない, Hepburn: Kaya-chan wa Kowakunai) is a Japanese supernatural comedy horror manga series written and illustrated by Tarō Yuri. It began serialization on Shinchosha's Kurage Bunch manga website in April 2022. An anime television series adaptation produced by East Fish Studio premiered aired from January to March 2026.

== Plot ==
Kaya is an infamous problem child in her kindergarten, always causing trouble for her friends and teachers. However, when teacher Chie is put in charge of her, she discovers that Kaya is actually protecting the children from evil spirits that wish to bring harm to others. A story of a misunderstood hero follows.

== Characters ==
=== Main characters ===
Kaya Satō (佐藤 神八, Satō Kaya) / Kaya-chan (カヤちゃん)
Voiced by: Azusa Tachibana (Japanese); Lexi Fontaine (English)
A 5-year-old kindergartener with powerful psychic abilities, which she uses to defend her classmates from evil spirits. However, since ordinary people cannot perceive these specters, she gets misunderstood as a problem child. It is later revealed that she is the result of her mother's failed attempt to give birth to an evil spirit, causing her soul to be infused with the spirit of the ancestor of the Ebisumori clan.
Chie Hasumi (蓮見 千枝, Hasumi Chie) / Chie-sensei (チエ先生)
Voiced by: Maaya Uchida
A young caretaker and teacher at the kindergarten Kaya attends. She is the only faculty member who knows that Kaya is actually protecting the other children from evil spirits and defends her whenever her colleagues scold her.
Osamu Mob (百武 治, Mob Osamu) / Mobuo (モブオ)
Voiced by: Fukushi Ochiai
A supernatural enthusiast who takes an interest in Kaya and the Ebisumori clan. However, this often causes him to get mistaken for a child stalker.
Namu Hirukomori (蛭子守 南無, Hirukomori Namu) / Nam (ナム)
Voiced by: Yuki Kaji (Japanese); Connor Fogarty (English)
Mobuo's partner and a distant relative of the Ebisumori clan. Like Kaya, he possesses psychic powers that allow him to see and destroy evil spirits. This made him grow up as an outcast until he met Mobuo, causing him to be very protective of him. He is also wary of Kaya, perceiving the spirit of the Ebisumori clan's ancestor within her.

=== Kaya's family ===
Shizuo Satō (佐藤静夫, Satō Shizuo) / Kaya-Papa (カヤパパ)
Voiced by: Toshiyuki Morikawa (Japanese); Kevin Andrew Rivera (English)
Kaya's father. He is an ordinary man without psychic powers who remains unaware of the existence of evil spirits. Though often having to work long hours, he still tries his best to be there for his daughter and pick her up from kindergarten whenever possible.
Mirai Satō (佐藤未来, Satō Mirai) / Kaya-Mama (カヤママ)
Voiced by: Mamiko Noto
Kaya's mother and the main antagonist. A seemingly ordinary woman with no psychic powers, she is later revealed to be pregnant with a powerful evil spirit. Growing up within the Ebisumori clan, she went mad upon discovering their practice of having non-psychics like her give birth to evil spirits to eliminate their enemies, prompting her to flee and plot to destroy them with their own dark rituals. In the end, Kaya destroys the demon, saving her from dying in childbirth while the baby is born healthy.
Nana Ebisumori (戎杜七奈, Ebisumori Nana)
Voiced by: Haruka Tomatsu
Kaya's aunt and the current head of the Ebisumori clan. Like her niece, she possesses psychic powers that allow her to perceive evil spirits, though not destroy them. After learning of Kaya's existence, she confronted and quickly bonded with her, picking her up from kindergarten whenever her father was unavailable. She wishes for Kaya to live an ordinary life, far away from evil spirits and the Ebisumori clan.
Mutsu Ebisumori (戎杜 睦, Ebisumori Mutsu)
Voiced by: Yoshiko Sakakibara
Kaya's grandmother and the former head of the Ebisumori clan. Like her granddaughter, she possessed psychic powers that allowed her to perceive and destroy evil spirits. Though once an advocate for her family's dark practices, she grew to regret her actions and allowed her second daughter, Mirai, to leave the clan. The unborn evil spirit Mirai is pregnant with later kills her.

=== Kindergarten ===
Akira-sensei (アキラ先生)
Voiced by: Azusa Tadokoro (Japanese); Allegra Clark (English)
Chihiro-sensei (チヒロ先生)
Voiced by: Shiori Izawa (Japanese); Stephanie Southerland (English)
Sakuya Maenuma (まえぬま さくや, Maenuma Sakuya) / Saku-chan (サクちゃん)
Voiced by: Misaki Kuno
Kentarō Ise (いせ けんたろう, Ise Kentarō) / Kenken (ケンケン)
Voiced by: Mutsumi Tamura
Yuzu Tachibana (たちばな ゆず, Tachibana Yuzu) / Yuzu-chan (ユズちゃん)
Voiced by: Chiemi Tanaka
Masaru (まさる, Masaru) / Ma-chan (まっちゃん)
Voiced by: Natsumi Fujiwara

== Media ==
=== Manga ===
Written and illustrated by Tarō Yuri, Kaya-chan Isn't Scary began serialization on Shinchosha's Kurage Bunch manga website on April 1, 2022. The series' chapters have been collected into nine tankōbon volumes as of April 2026.

In November 2024, Seven Seas Entertainment announced that they had licensed the series for English publication beginning in April 2025.

==== Volumes ====
No.	Original release date	Original ISBN	English release date	English ISBN
1	August 8, 2022	978-4-10-772520-2	April 29, 2025	979-8-89373-154-5
1. "Swings Aren't Scary"; 2. "Picture Books Aren't Scary"; 3. "Toilets Aren't Scary"; 4. "Kaya-chan Isn't Scary?"; 5. "Parks Aren't Scary"; 6. "Strangers Aren't Scary"
2	December 8, 2022	978-4-10-772549-3	July 15, 2025	979-8-89373-155-2
7. "Electrical Outlets Aren't Scary"; 8. "Invisible Things Aren't Scary"; 9. "The Pool Isn't Scary"; 10. "Mr. Mob Isn't Scary"; 11. "Home Visits Aren't Scary?"; 12. "Dolls Aren't Scary"; 13. "Trains Aren't Scary"
3	May 9, 2023	978-4-10-772596-7	October 28, 2025	979-8-89373-537-6
14. "The Fetchers Aren't Scary"; 15. "Grandma Isn't Scary?"; 16. "Animals Aren't Scary"; 17. "Shopping Malls Aren't Scary"; 18. "Lost Children Aren't Scary"; 19. "'Be Quiet' Isn't Scary"; 20. "The Punishment Room Isn't Scary"
4	October 6, 2023	978-4-10-772655-1	January 6, 2026	979-8-89373-538-3
21. "Mirrors Aren't Scary"; 22. "Hospitals Aren't Scary"; 23. "Rainy Days Aren't Scary"; 24. "Playground Equipment Isn't Scary"; 25. "Staying Home Alone Isn't Scary"; 26. "'Good Morning' Isn't Scary"; 27. "Reversed Isn't Scary"
5	April 9, 2024	978-4-10-772702-2	May 5, 2026	979-8-89373-646-5
28. "The Sandbox Isn't Scary"; 29. "Bikes Aren't Scary"; 30. "'We're Watching You' Isn't Scary"; 31. "Words Aren't Scary"; 32. "Kind People Aren't Scary?"; 33. "People with the Sight Aren't Scary"; 34. "Psychics Aren't Scary"
6	November 9, 2024	978-4-10-772763-3	October 6, 2026	979-8-89561-367-2
35. "Chie-sensei Isn't Scary"; 36. "Loud Voices Aren't Scary"; 37. "Hide-and-seek Isn't Scary"; 38. "Cameras Aren't Scary"; 39. "Aunt Nana Isn't Scary?"
7	June 9, 2025	978-4-10-772842-5	January 5, 2027	979-8-89765-614-1
8	January 8, 2026	978-4-10-772903-3	May 4, 2027	979-8-89863-962-4
9	April 9, 2026	978-4-10-772929-3	—	—
10	December 9, 2026	978-4-10-773008-4	—	—

=== Anime ===
An anime television series adaptation was announced in November 2024. It was produced by East Fish Studio and directed by Hiroshi Ikehata, with series composition handled by Shigeru Murakoshi, characters designed by Taro Yamada and Hiroyuki Moriguchi, and music composed by Kohta Yamamoto and Shun Narita. The series aired from January 11 to March 29, 2026, on TV Tokyo and other networks. The opening theme song is "Maboroshi no Yukue" (まぼろしの行方; 'The Phantom's Destination'), performed by Isekaijoucho and the ending theme song is "Playmour", performed by Sak and Tao and featuring Azusa Tachibana as her character Kaya-chan. The series was streamed on Crunchyroll, and Medialink licensed the series in Southeast Asia and Oceania (except Australia and New Zealand) for streaming on Ani-One Asia's YouTube channel. An English dub provided by Kadokawa premiered on the same day as the sub version.

==== Episodes ====
No.	Title	Directed by	Written by	Storyboarded by	Original release date
1	"Kaya-chan Isn't Scary?"; Transliteration: "Kaya-chan wa Kowakunai?" (Japanese: カヤちゃんはコワくない?)	Chisei Hitsu	Shigeru Murakoshi	Hiroshi Ikehata	January 11, 2026
The new caretaker Chie begins to notice mysterious circumstances surrounding the "troublemaker" Kaya.
2	"Invisible Things Aren't Scary/Parks Aren't Scary/Strangers Aren't Scary?"; Transliteration: "Mietari mono wa Kuwakunai/Kōen wa kowakunai/Shiranai hito wa kowakunai?" (Japanese: 見えたりものはコワくない / 公園はコワくない / 知らない人はコワくない?)	Daiki Nishimura	Chika Suzumura	Hiroshi Ikehata; Kinya Nakamura	January 18, 2026
Rumors began spreading about a suspicious person lurking around the kindergarten.
3	"Mirrors Aren't Scary/The Pool Isn't Scary/Uncle Mob Isn't Scary?"; Transliteration: "Kagami wa kowakunai/Pūru wa kowakunai/Mobu-ojisan wa kowakunai?" (Japanese: 鏡はコワくない / プールはコワくない / モブおじさんはコワくない？)	Ying Xing Mao	Yūki Watanabe	Tomoya Takashima; Yumika Aoyama	January 25, 2026
Mob shows up out of nowhere and approaches Chie, saying he wants to talk about Kaya.
4	"Lost Kids Aren't Scary/Dolls Aren't Scary/Home Visits Aren't Scary?"; Transliteration: "Maigo wa kowakunai/O-ningyō wa kowakunai/Katei hōmon wa kowakunai" (Japanese: 迷子はコワくない / お人形はコワくない / 家庭訪問はコワくない？)	Yoshihiro Sasaki	Shigeru Murakoshi	Tomoya Takashima; Yumika Aoyama	February 1, 2026
Chie hears from Mob that something is inside Kaya's house, and it's time for her to do home visits.
5	"Trains Aren't Scary/Grandma Isn't Scary?"; Transliteration: "Densha wa kowakunai/Obāchan wa kowakunai?" (Japanese: 電車はコワくない / おばあちゃんはコワくない？)	Yang Liu	Hiroaki Shimura	Chika Suzumura	February 8, 2026
Chie hears from Mob that something is inside Kaya's house, and it's time for her to do home visits.
6	"Shopping Malls Aren't Scary/Punishment Room Isn't Scary?"; Transliteration: "Shoppingu sentā wa kowakunai/O-shioki-beya wa kowakunai?" (Japanese: ショッピングセンターはコワくない / お仕置き部屋はコワくない？)	Miri Aoyama; Ye Hui Qi	Yūki Watanabe	Harume Kosaka	February 15, 2026
Kaya visits a shopping mall with her father, and Mob casually follows them.
7	"Hospitals Aren't Scary/Playground Equipment Isn't Scary/Staying Home Alone Isn't Scary?"; Transliteration: "Byōin wa kowakunai/Yūgu wa kowakunai/O-rusuban wa kowakunai?" (Japanese: 病院はコワくない / 遊具はコワくない / お留守番はコワくない？)	Yūto Kimura	Shigeru Murakoshi	Minoru Ōhara	February 22, 2026
Kaya's dad asks Nana to step in when he can't pick her up.
8	"Backwards Isn't Scary/The Sandbox Isn't Scary/Nice People Aren't Scary?"; Transliteration: "Sakasama wa kowakunai/O-sunaba wa kowakunai/Yasashii hito wa kowakunai?" (Japanese: 逆さまはコワくない / お砂場はコワくない / 優しい人はコワくない？)	Wei Peng Xu	Chika Suzumura	Minoru Ōhara	March 1, 2026
Chie-sensei gets a call that Mob has suddenly gone missing.
9	"People Who Can See Them Aren't Scary?/Chie-sensei Isn't Scary"; Transliteration: "Mieteru Hito wa Kowakunai?/Chie-sensei wa Kowakuna" (Japanese: みえてる人はコワくない？ / チエ先生はコワくない)	Ying Xing Mao	Yūki Watanabe	Takeshi Mori	March 8, 2026
Namu attempts to kidnap Kaya.
10	"Hide-and-Seek Isn't Scary/Cameras Aren't Scary/Aunt Nana Isn't Scary?"; Transliteration: "Kakurenbo wa Kowakunai/Kage wa Kowakunai?" (Japanese: かくれんぼはコワくない / 影はコワくない？)	Masayuki Iimura	Shigeru Murakoshi	Daiki Nishimura	March 15, 2026
During a game of hide-and-seek, Kaya enters a spectral state where she can speak to the ghosts, revealing a deeper merge with her family's curse.
11	"Mommy's House Isn't Scary/Little Sisters Aren't Scary?/The Ebisumori Family Isn't Scary?"; Transliteration: "Mama no ie wa kowakunai/Imōto wa kowakunai?/Ebisumori-ke wa kowakunai?" (Japanese: ママの家はコワくない / 妹はコワくない？ / 恵比寿森家はコワくない？)	Yoshihiro Sasaki	Chika Suzumura	Takeshi Mori	March 22, 2026
Chie and Kaya visit the Ebisumori estate, where the dark history of the clan and Mirai's true plan for her second child are finally brought to light.
12	"Kaya-chan Isn't Scared"; Transliteration: "Kaya-chan wa Kowakunai" (Japanese: カヤちゃんはコワくない)	Akari Aoyama	Shigeru Murakoshi	Akari Aoyama; Hiroshi Ikehata	March 29, 2026
A confrontation between everyone at the Ebisumori estate and Mirai leads to a conflict that will determine the future of the entire Ebisumori family.
