= Azusa Tachibana =

Japanese voice actress (born 2004)

- 橘 杏咲
- Born: October 12, 2004 (age 22); Tokyo, Japan
- Occupation: Voice actress
- Agent: I'm Enterprise
- Known for: Princession Orchestra as Nagase Ichijō; Bad Girl as Yuu Yuutani; Kaya-chan Isn't Scary as Kaya Satō; Magical Girl Lyrical Nanoha Exceeds Gun Blaze Vengeance as Shiina Kuze

Azusa Tachibana (橘 杏咲, Tachibana Azusa; born October 12, 2004) is a Japanese voice actress from Tokyo who is affiliated with I'm Enterprise. She started her voice acting career in 2022, and in 2025 played her first main roles as Nagase Ichijō in Princession Orchestra and Yuu Yuutani in Bad Girl.

== Biography ==
Tachibana was born in Tokyo on October 12, 2004. From an early age she dreamed of becoming an announcer, encouraged by her mother who noticed how much she liked talking. She also became interested in theater since her family regularly went to see musicals. When she was in junior high school, her mother encouraged her to join the school light music club. Her mother had watched the anime series K-On! and noted how Azusa shared a name with one of the characters, the guitarist Azusa Nakano, so she asked Azusa to give the club a try. She served as a band guitarist and vocalist during her junior high school and senior high school years, playing anime songs from series such as K-On! and Gintama, as well as songs from bands such as the Peggies.

Tachibana's interest in anime began while in junior high school after watching Gintama. Her interest grew during the COVID-19 pandemic in Japan, when she would watch more anime during lockdown. Having noticed that the voice actors that appeared in the anime she previously watched also appearing in other works, she asked her mother to enroll her at the Japan Narration Acting Institute, now aiming to become a voice actress. After completing her training, she became affiliated with the talent agency I'm Enterprise in 2021.

Tachibana's first voice acting role was in 2022, playing a Shinigami in an episode of Bleach: Thousand-Year Blood War. In 2023, she voiced Himari Tamayori in the visual novel Seifuku Kanojo. In 2024, she played her first main roles as Nagase Ichijō in Princession Orchestra, and in 2025, as Yuu Yuutani in Bad Girl.

== Personal life ==
Tachibana cites drawing portraits as one of her hobbies, often drawing pictures of her friends and fellow voice actors.

== Filmography ==
=== Anime ===
Year	Title	Role	Notes	Ref.
2024	Jellyfish Can't Swim in the Night	Mei's Fan		
2024	Dandadan	Trespassing Students		
2025	Anne Shirley	Ella May MacPherson		
2025	Princession Orchestra	Nagase Ichijō / Princess Meteor		
2025	Bad Girl	Yuu Yuutani		
2026	Noble Reincarnation: Born Blessed, So I'll Obtain Ultimate Power	Alichey		
2026	Kaya-chan Isn't Scary	Kaya Satō		
2026	The Classroom of a Black Cat and a Witch	Ewe Aries		
2026	Magical Girl Lyrical Nanoha Exceeds Gun Blaze Vengeance	Shiina Kuze		
2026	So What's Wrong with Getting Reborn as a Goblin?	Chloe		
2026	The World's Strongest Witch	Lorna Hermit		
2026	Bleach: Thousand-Year Blood War	Kazui Kurosaki		

=== Video games ===
Year	Title	Role	Platform	Ref.
2026	Arknights: Endfield	Endministrator (Female)	iOS, Android, PS5, PC	
2026	Nekopara: Sekai Connect	Cannelé	iOS, Android, PC	
2026	Wuthering Waves	Xuanqing	iOS, Android, PS5, PC, Mac, Xbox Series X/S	
