= Boku no Imōto wa "Ōsaka Okan" =

Japanese anime television series

- Promotional Poster of Boku-no-imoutowa Osaka-okan featuring main characters.

僕の妹は「大阪おかん」
- Genre: Comedy
- Anime television series
- Directed by: Kōtarō Ishidate
- Written by: Kōtarō Ishidate
- Music by: Junichi Inoue
- Studio: Charaction
- Licensed by: NA: Crunchyroll
- Original network: BS Asahi
- Original run: December 21, 2012 – March 15, 2013
- Episodes: 12 + 1

Boku no Imōto wa "Ōsaka Okan" (僕の妹は「大阪おかん」; lit. My Little Sister's an "Osaka Momma") (officially stylized as Boku-no-imoutowa"Osaka-okan") is a 12-episode anime television series produced by Charaction and directed by Kōtarō Ishidate. It aired in Japan between December 21, 2012, and March 15, 2013, on BS Asahi. The series has been licensed for streaming by Crunchyroll.

== Plot ==
Kyousuke's younger sister Namika has been living apart from him for ten years. One day, she returns and begins to live with him again, but she has turned into an energetic Osaka girl.

== Characters ==
Namika Ishihara (石原 浪花, Ishihara Namika)
Voiced by: Kana Asumi
Kyosuke Ishihara (石原 京介, Ishihara Kyōsuke)
Voiced by: Ryoko Shiraishi
Kaede (楓, Kaede)
Voiced by: Yuka Iguchi

== Media ==
=== Anime ===
The anime is produced by Charaction and is directed by Kōtarō Ishidate with original character designs by Sōta Sugahara. The anime is formatted as a series of shorts, with each episode being only a few minutes in length. The series aired between December 21 to March 15, 2013, on BS Asahi and was streamed by Crunchyroll. The series uses one piece of theme music, by Kana Asumi. An additional episode came bundled with the Blu-ray release of the series on April 19, 2013.

==== Episode list ====
No.	Title	Original release date
1	"One Morning, I Got an Osaka Momma for a Sister."; Transliteration: "Aru Chō, Ōsaka o kan no imōto ga dekimashite." (Japanese: ある朝、大阪おかんの妹ができまして。)	December 21, 2012
2	"Yes, My Sister is an Osaka Momma!"; Transliteration: "Imōto ga Ōsaka o kan'na ndesukedo!" (Japanese: 妹が大阪おかんなんですけど!)	January 4, 2013
3	"My Sister Can't Be This Much of an Osaka Momma"; Transliteration: "Ore no imōto ga kon'nani Ōsaka o kan'na wake ga nai" (Japanese: 俺の妹がこんなに大阪おかんなわけがない)	January 11, 2013
4	"I'm an Osaka Momma, But What's It Matter If We've Got Love?"; Transliteration: "Ōsaka o ka ndakedo ai sae areba kankeinai yo ne ~tsu" (Japanese: 大阪おかんだけど愛さえあれば関係ないよねっ)	January 18, 2013
5	"Osaka Momma's Home"; Transliteration: "Ōsaka o kan hōmu" (Japanese: 大阪おかんホーム)	January 25, 2013
6	"Recently, My Sister is a Bit Osaka Momma-ish"; Transliteration: "Saikin, imōto no yō su ga chotto Ōsaka o kan'na ndaga." (Japanese: 最近、妹のようすがちょっと大阪おかんなんだが。)	February 1, 2013
7	"One of These People is an Osaka Momma!"; Transliteration: "Kono naka ni 1-ri, Ōsaka o kan ga iru!" (Japanese: この中に1人、大阪おかんがいる!)	February 8, 2013
8	"Or it May Be a Present Progressive Osaka Momma"; Transliteration: "Aruiwa genzai shinkōkeino Ōsaka o ka n" (Japanese: あるいは現在進行形の大阪おかん)	February 15, 2013
9	"The Osaka Momma Sister and the Suffering Me"; Transliteration: "Ōsaka o kan'na imōto to junan'na ore" (Japanese: 大阪おかんな妹と受難な俺)	February 22, 2013
10	"My Sister is the Osaka Momma Goddess"; Transliteration: "Imōto wa Ōsaka o kan no megami-chan" (Japanese: 妹は大阪おかんの女神ちゃん)	March 1, 2013
11	"Seems the Recent Osaka Momma Craze is All Thanks to Me"; Transliteration: "Saikin no Ōsaka o kan būmu wa dōyara ore no okagerashīdesu yo" (Japanese: 最近の大阪おかんブームはどうやら俺のおかげらしいですよ)	March 8, 2013
12	"Namika-han@Unmotivated"; Transliteration: "Naniwa-han@ ganbaranai" (Japanese: 浪花はん@がんばらない)	March 15, 2013
Extra	"The Next Project!? The Long-Awaited 'Our Big Brother's Tokyo Rules' Episode 1."; Transliteration: "Uchi no o nīchan wa `Tōkyō rūru'" (Japanese: うちのお兄ちゃんは「東京ルール」)	April 19, 2013
