= Princession Orchestra =

Japanese anime television series

- Key visual
- プリンセッション・オーケストラ
- Genre: Magical girl; Music; Science fiction
- Created by: Unison; King Records
- Screenplay by: Manta Aisora
- Directed by: Shin Oonuma
- Music by: Elements Garden
- Country of origin: Japan
- Original language: Japanese
- No. of episodes: 48

Production
- Producers: Yutaka Suwa; Yuzuru Saitou; Takashi Kamo; Akihiro Tomita; Akimichi Tsugawa; Eiji Oki
- Animator: Silver Link
- Production companies: Project Princess-Session (Note: Label consisting of various companies); TV Tokyo

Original release
- Network: TXN (TV Tokyo), AT-X
- Release: April 6, 2025 – March 29, 2026

Princession Orchestra (プリンセッション・オーケストラ, Purinsesshon Ōkesutora) is a Japanese anime television series created by Aria Entertainment and King Records and produced by Silver Link. It is originally conceived by Akifumi Kaneko and Noriyasu Agematsu, the creative duo behind Senki Zesshō Symphogear with direction from Shin Oonuma and Manta Aisora as main writer. It premiered on TV Tokyo and other TXN stations from April 6, 2025, to March 29, 2026. The series uses music and idols as its main motifs while the overall theme is after Alice in Wonderland.

== Story ==
The story revolves around Alicepia: a secret wonderland that has existed since ancient times. Alicepia is hidden to most humans, though its doors are open for young girls who wish to visit. The Alicepians are friendly creatures who love interacting with the young ladies, gleefully cheering them on in their activities, such as singing and dancing. Alicepia's peaceful every day life is threatened as mysterious monsters, called Jammerwocks, start appearing. In order to protect Alicepia, the Princesses are called to awaken their powers and defend this land through the power of song and dance. What they don't know is that Aliecepia's own existence is filled with secrets and its true nature is a mystery to unravel.

== Characters ==
Minamo Sorano (空野 みなも, Sorano Minamo) / Princess Ripple (プリンセス・リップル, Purinsesu Rippuru)
Voiced by: Azusa Aoi
She is a 13-year-old girl who transforms from an ordinary middle school student into a hero, bravely fighting monsters to protect her friends. She transforms into Princess Ripple and her theme color is blue.
Her special moves include: Ripple Shiny Stream, Ripple Hammer Splash and Ripple Sparkle Slider.
Kagari Shirube (識辺 かがり, Shirube Kagari) / Princess Zeal (プリンセス・ジール, Purinsesu Jīru)
Voiced by: Yuri Fujimoto
She's a bright and positive 13-year-old second-year middle school student. She is a songstress in Alicepia and captivates people with her outstanding singing and dancing. She transforms into Princess Zeal and her theme color is red.
Her special moves include Zeal Rising Volcano, Zeal Fire Critical and Zeal Burning Assault.
Nagase Ichijō (一条 ながせ, Ichijō Nagase) / Princess Meteor (プリンセス・ミーティア, Purinsesu Mītia)
Voiced by: Azusa Tachibana
She's a lively and cheerful first-year middle school student known for her strong intuition and ability to befriend anyone. She often acts on impulse, trusting her feelings more than careful planning. She transforms into Princess Meteor and though her appearance is lime green, her official theme color is yellow.
Her special moves include: Meteor Asteroid Shower, Meteor Rocket Strike and Meteor Pressure Graviton.
Sumire Kazahana (風花 すみれ, Kazahana Sumire) / Flower Knight Sincerity (花の騎士シンシア, Hananokishi Shinshia) / Princess Viola (プリンセス・ヴィオラ, Purinsesu Vuiora)
Voiced by: Akari Kitō
A mature and gentle 14-year-old upperclasswoman who serves as a student librarian at the princess' middle school. She is later revealed to be the antagonist Flower Knight Sincerity, working under the White Queen, but later becomes Princess Viola. Her theme color is violet.
As a Flower Knight her abilities are fencing with a rapier while as a Princess her special move is Viola × Neige Claymore Smasher performed with her sister Lily.
Lily Kazahana (風花 りり, Kazahana Riri) / Flower Knight Purity (花の騎士ピュリティ, Hananokishi Pyuriti) / Princess Neige (プリンセス・ネージュ, Purinsesu Nēju)
Voiced by: Miku Itō
A 10-year-old girl who became traumatized after watching her Alicepian friend Thoma (トーマ) disappear in front of her. She is later revealed to be the antagonist Flower Knight Purity, working under the White Queen, but later becomes Princess Niege. Her theme color is pink.
As a Flower Knight her abilities are fencing with a rapier while as a Princess her special move is Viola × Neige Claymore Smasher performed with her sister Sumire.
Naviyu (ナビーユ, Nabīyu)
Voiced by: Hiro Shimono
He is an Alicepian resembling a rabbit who serves as a guide and sidekick to the Princesses. He is later revealed to be the king of Alicepia.
Red Queen (赤いの女王, Akai no Joō)
Voiced by: Nana Mizuki
An antagonist who seeks to overwhelm Alicepia with Musessence. She is later revealed to be Princess Sanguine (プリンセス・シンク, Purinsesu Shinku) in the past.
White Queen (白の女王, Shiro no Joō)
Voiced by: Kana Hanazawa
An antagonist who seeks to deprive Alicepia of Musessence along with the Flower Knights. She is later revealed to be Princess Chalk (プリンセス・ハクア, Purinsesu Hakua) in the past.
Calist (カリスト, Karisuto)
Voiced by: Chiaki Kobayashi
The leader of a group called Band Snatch (バンド・スナッチ, Bando Sunacchi) under the Red Queen. He is a vocalist.
Gita (ギータ, Gīta)
Voiced by: Shōya Chiba
A member of Band Snatch. He plays the electric guitar.
Bass (ベス, Besu)
Voiced by: Junya Enoki
A member of Band Snatch. He plays the bass guitar.
Drun (ドラン)
Voiced by: Shunsuke Takeuchi
A member of Band Snatch. He plays a drum kit.
Seishirō Sorano (空野誠志郎, Sorano Seishirō)
Voiced by: Satoshi Hino
Minamo's father. He is a famous newscaster.
Yōko Sorano (空野ようこ, Sorano Yōko)
Voiced by: Yoshino Nanjō
Minamo's mother. She is aware of Alicepia.
Riku Sorano (空野りく, Sorano Riku)
Minamo's younger brother who likes to play video games.
Voiced by: Yuki Wakai
Natsu Hinomoto (陽ノ下なつ, Hinomoto Natsu)
Voiced by: Hikari Aimura
Minamo's best friend. Although she does not become a Princess, she plays a major role in the story.

== Media ==
=== Anime ===
Princession Orchestra began its airing on TV Tokyo and other TXN stations on April 6, 2025, and will run for four consecutive cours. Orcheria (Azusa Aoi, Yuri Fujimoto, and Azusa Tachibana) performed four theme songs (two opening themes and two ending themes) respectively. Elements Garden composed all the music for the series. The first two episodes were briefly available in the US on the anime's official YouTube channel with official English subs during Anime Expo 2025.

=== Episodes ===
The series is divided in four parts, called cours, each consisting of twelve episodes. Between each cour the show took a week off, airing a special summary episode narrating the events of the previous cour.

No.	Title	Directed by (Note: Information is taken from the ending credits of each episode.)	Storyboarded by	Original release date
Part 1
1	"This Incredible Wonderland"; Transliteration: "Kono Subarashiki Sekai" (Japanese: このすばらしきせかい)	Yuusuke Sekine	Yuusuke Sekine	April 6, 2025
2	"A Girl Giving It Her All"; Transliteration: "On'nanoko no Isshōkenmei" (Japanese: 女の子の一生懸命)	Junya Koshiba	Koji Sawai	April 13, 2025
3	"Resolve is Declared!"; Transliteration: "Ketsui Kanryō!" (Japanese: 決意完了！)	Tsutomu Murakami	Yuuichi Nihei	April 20, 2025
4	"Nagase Ichijou Does Not Stray"; Transliteration: "Ichijō Nagase wa Nagarenai" (Japanese: 一条ながせは流れない)	Yuusuke Onoda	Shinichi Watanabe	April 27, 2025
5	"Shooting Star, Cut Through the Darkness"; Transliteration: "Ryūsei, Yami o Kirisaite" (Japanese: 流星、闇を切り裂いて)	Jun Fukuta	Koichi Ohata	May 4, 2025
6	"The Divas' Day Off"; Transliteration: "Utahime no Kyūsoku" (Japanese: 歌姫の休息)	Geisei Morita	Toshinori Narita	May 11, 2025
7	"Whispers of Change"; Transliteration: "Yokan, Aratanari" (Japanese: 予感、新たなり)	Junya Koshiba	Yuusuke Sekine	May 18, 2025
8	"Princession"; Transliteration: "Purinsesshon" (Japanese: プリンセッション)	Tsutomu Murakami and Minami Harada	Koji Sawai	May 25, 2025
9	"'Love' is Invincible"; Transliteration: "'Suki' wa Muteki" (Japanese: 「好き」は無敵)	Kouki Onoue	Kouki Onoue	June 1, 2025
10	"Mikan's Travails"; Transliteration: "Mikan Funtō-ki" (Japanese: みかん奮闘記)	Yuusuke Onoda	Shinichi Watanabe	June 8, 2025
11	"Calist's Shadow"; Transliteration: "Karisuto no Kage" (Japanese: カリストの影)	Junya Koshiba	Shinichi Watanabe	June 15, 2025
12	"Tears Have No Place in Paradise"; Transliteration: "Rakuen ni Namida wa Iranai" (Japanese: 楽園に涙はいらない)	Jun Fukuta	Koichi Ohata (Note: Miscredited to Shinichi Watanabe in the TV Version and corrected to Ohata in the BD Version.)	June 22, 2025
Part 2
13	"An Interlude with You"; Transliteration: "Anata to Intāryūdo" (Japanese: あなたとインターリュード)	Junya Koshiba	Namako Umino	July 6, 2025
14	"Let the Inventing Begin!"; Transliteration: "Hatsumei o Hajimeyou" (Japanese: 発明を始めよう)	Tsutomu Murakami, Minami Harada, and Yuna Shimotochitana	Koji Sawai	July 13, 2025
15	"Who I Want to Be"; Transliteration: "Naritai Jibun" (Japanese: なりたい自分)	Kouki Onoue	Yuusuke Sekine	July 20, 2025
16	"Guardian of Glimmer"; Transliteration: "Kirakira no Mamoribito" (Japanese: キラキラの守り人)	Yuusuke Onoda	Shinichi Watanabe	July 27, 2025
17	"A Rhythmic Passion"; Transliteration: "Ritsudō suru Netsujō" (Japanese: 律動する熱情)	Junya Koshiba	Koji Sawai	August 3, 2025
18	"Handing Down a Place to Belong"; Transliteration: "Uketsugareru Ibasho" (Japanese: 受け継がれる居場所)	Jun Fukuta	Koji Sawai	August 10, 2025
19	"The Meaning of Freedom"; Transliteration: "Jiyū no Imi wa" (Japanese: 自由の意味は)	Shigeki Awai, Yuna Shimotochitana, and Hiroo Unezaki	Namako Umino	August 17, 2025
20	"The Limits of Justice"; Transliteration: "Seigi no Kyōkaisen" (Japanese: 正義の境界線)	Kouki Onoue	Shinichi Watanabe	August 24, 2025
21	"Power to Destroy, Power to Protect"; Transliteration: "Hakai suru Chikara, Mamoru Chikara" (Japanese: 破壊する力、守る力)	Yuusuke Onoda	Shinichi Watanabe	August 31, 2025
22	"What I Want Most"; Transliteration: "Watashi no Ichiban Shitai Koto" (Japanese: 私が一番やりたいこと)	Takanori Minoura	Yuusuke Sekine	September 7, 2025
23	"Take Me Higher"; Transliteration: "Motto Takaku" (Japanese: もっと高く)	Kouki Onoue	Koichi Ohata	September 14, 2025
24	"To the Farthest Reaches of the World"; Transliteration: "Sekai no Hate Made mo" (Japanese: 世界の果てまでも)	Jun Fukuta	Yuusuke Sekine, Ken Takahashi, and Kouhei Kobayashi	September 21, 2025
Part 3
25	"The Origin Story Episode (Working Title)"; Transliteration: "Tanjō Tokubetsu-hen (Kari)" (Japanese: 誕生特別編（仮）)	Yuna Shimotochidana and Hiroo Unezaki	Shinichi Watanabe	October 5, 2025
26	"The Beauty with the Peerless Blade"; Transliteration: "Zettou Kajin" (Japanese: 絶刀佳人)	Masashi Tsunemitsu	Koji Sawai	October 12, 2025
27	"Vibrant Singing"; Transliteration: "Takaraka ni Utau" (Japanese: 高らかに歌う)	Yusuke Onoda	Shinichi Watanabe	October 19, 2025
28	"As I Am"; Transliteration: "Sugao no Mama de" (Japanese: 素顔のままで)	Junya Koshiba	Toshinori Narita	October 26, 2025
29	"Two Flowers"; Transliteration: "Nirinka" (Japanese: 二輪花)	Takanri Minoura	Koji Sawai	November 2, 2025
30	"What Am I Doing"; Transliteration: "Watashi wa Nani wa Shiteiruno" (Japanese: 私は何をしているの)	Jun Fukuda	Shinichi Watanabe	November 9, 2025
31	"Putting on a Play"; Transliteration: "Enjitemiru" (Japanese: エンジテミル)	Masashi Tsunemitsu	Koji Sawai	November 16, 2025
32	"Omen"; Transliteration: "Kizashi" (Japanese: 兆し)	Junya Koshiba	Koji Sawai	November 23, 2025
33	"At the Depths of a Frozen Heart"; Transliteration: "Itetsuku Kokoro no Okusoko de" (Japanese: 凍てつく心の奥底で)	Yusuke Onoda	Koichi Ohata	November 30, 2025
34	"Although We May Never Meet Again"; Transliteration: "Mō Aenai Koto Yori Mo" (Japanese: もう逢えないことよりも)	Takanori Minoura	Ten Oguro, Satoshi Hirabayashi and Shin Oonuma	December 7, 2025
35	"As Buds Open, Flowers Bloom"; Transliteration: "Tsubomi o Hiraki, Hana ga Saku" (Japanese: 蕾を開き、花は咲く)	Junya Koshiba	Koichi Ohata	December 14, 2025
36	"Swaying in the Breeze"; Transliteration: "Kaze ni Yureru" (Japanese: 風に揺れる)	Jun Fukuda and Hiroo Unezaki	Shinichi Watanabe	December 21, 2025
Part 4
37	"A Long Way to Go Before the Snow Melts"; Transliteration: "Yukidoke ni wa Mada Tōku" (Japanese: 雪解けにはまだ遠く)	TBD	TBD	January 11, 2026
38	"For My Beloved Friends"; Transliteration: "Daisukina Anata-tachi e" (Japanese: 大好きなあなたたちへ)	TBD	TBD	January 18, 2026
39	"This Is Where It Begins"; Transliteration: "Koko Kara Hajimeyou" (Japanese: ここから始めよう)	TBD	TBD	January 25, 2026
40	"To Keep Hold of the Hands We've Joined"; Transliteration: "Tsunaida Te o Hanasanai" (Japanese: 繋いだ手を離さない)	TBD	TBD	February 1, 2026
41	"Circle of Life"; Transliteration: "Inochi no Wa" (Japanese: 命の輪)	TBD	TBD	February 8, 2026
42	"Double Exposure"; Transliteration: "Tajū Rokō" (Japanese: 多重露光)	TBD	TBD	February 15, 2026
43	"King"; Transliteration: "Ō" (Japanese: 王)	TBD	TBD	February 22, 2026
44	"Bloom Into White Once More"; Transliteration: "Shiroku Kaerizaku" (Japanese: 白く返り咲く)	TBD	TBD	March 1, 2026
45	"Go Beyond"; Transliteration: "Gō Biyondo" (Japanese: ゴービヨンド)	TBD	TBD	March 8, 2026
46	"Song That Invades"; Transliteration: "Shinryaku no Utagoe" (Japanese: 侵略の歌声)	TBD	TBD	March 15, 2026
47	"Key to the World"; Transliteration: "Sekai no Aikotoba" (Japanese: 世界の合言葉)	TBD	TBD	March 22, 2026
48	"The Trail We Blazed"; Transliteration: "Watashi-tachi no Kiseki" (Japanese: わたしたちの軌跡)	TBD	TBD	March 29, 2026

=== Merchandise ===
Takara Tomy handles the merchandising rights for the show, with the company releasing toys based on the magical items that appear throughout the series and a variety of other collectibles such as plushies, key-chains and figures.

== See also ==
- Symphogear: Another magical girl franchise created by Akifumi Kaneko and Noriyasu Agematsu.
