= Bronya =

Character in the Honkai video game series

- Honkai character
- Official artwork of Bronya Rand, the latest Bronya iteration, as she appears in Honkai: Star Rail
- First game: Guns Girl Z (2014)
- Voiced by: English: Madeline Reiter; Chinese: Hanser (GGZ, current; HI3); TetraCalyx (GGZ, former); Xie Ying (HSR); Japanese: Kana Asumi (GGZ, current; HI3); Kana Hanazawa (GGZ, former); Korean: Lee Bo-hee

In-universe information
- Full name: Bronya Zaychik (GGZ); Bronya Alexeievna Zaychik (HI3); Bronya Rand (HSR)
- Weapon: Mecha (primary; GGZ, HI3); Rifle with bayonet (HSR)
- Relatives: Cocolia (adoptive mother)
- Origin: Siberia (GGZ, HI3); Belobog, Jarilo-VI (HSR)
- Types: Psychic, Biologic, Mecha, Imaginary (HI3); Wind (HSR)
- Paths: Harmony (combat); Preservation (lore)

Bronya (/ˈbrɔːnjə/ BRAWN-yuh, Chinese: 布洛妮娅; pinyin: Bùluònīyà) is a character in the Honkai video game series developed by miHoYo. Several iterations of Bronya have appeared throughout the series, the first of which was in Guns Girl Z. In Honkai Impact 3rd, Bronya Alexeievna Zaychik (Note: In this name that follows East Slavic naming customs, the patronymic is Alexeievna and the family name is Zaychik.) (Note: 布洛妮娅·阿列克谢耶夫娜·扎伊切克; Bùluònīyà Ālièkèxièyēfūnà Zhāyīqièkè) is from Siberia and is a Valkyrie, a warrior trained to fight against the supernatural force known as the Honkai. In Honkai: Star Rail, Bronya Rand (Note: 布洛妮娅·兰德; Bùluònīyà Lándé) is the current Supreme Guardian of Belobog, a city on the ice-encased planet of Jarilo-VI. She formerly served as the right-hand woman of her adoptive mother, Cocolia, before revolting against her with assistance from the game's protagonist the Trailblazer.

As of 2026, eleven playable battlesuits have been released for Bronya in Honkai Impact 3rd. Bronya Rand was generally received well for her strength, selflessness and character growth, with critics praising the tragedy and maturity of her character arc. Fans and commentators also highlighted Bronya's recurring presence across the Honkai series and her close relationship with the character Seele.

== Creation and design ==
Bronya first appeared under the name Bronya Zaychik in the earlier Honkai game Guns Girl Z (also known as Houkai Gakuen 2), a zombie shooting game that Yahoo News commentator Yan Ku described as leading into the alternate reality seen in Honkai Impact 3rd. She was the third playable character in the Honkai series to be released. Ku described her as a kuudere, in reference to the Japanese term for characters that show little emotion. Bronya appeared in Honkai Impact 3rd, which was released in 2016. An alternate-world counterpart of Bronya who works as a hacker, known as Haxxor Bunny, was released in version 4.7 of Honkai Impact 3rd in 2021. This version of Bronya later inspired the character Silver Wolf in Honkai: Star Rail. Since her release in Honkai Impact 3rd, Bronya has received 11 playable battlesuits, the latest of which, Herrscher of Truth, (Note: 真理之律者; Zhēnlǐ zhī Lǜzhě) was released in version 6.3 of the game on December 15, 2022 in China, and on January 12, 2023 globally.

A different iteration of Bronya, whose last name is Rand, was revealed to be in Honkai: Star Rail when she appeared in a trailer for the character Seele, which was released on April 22, 2023. The next day, miHoYo released a video analyzing this Bronya's combat abilities. Bronya Rand was released as a playable character upon the game's release on April 26; she was added to the game's standard character gacha banner.

In Guns Girl Z, Bronya is voiced in Chinese by Hanser and in Japanese by Kana Asumi. She was previously voiced in Chinese by TetraCalyx and in Japanese by Kana Hanazawa. Asumi and Hanser reprise their roles in Honkai Impact 3rd. For Honkai: Star Rail, she is voiced in Chinese by Xie Ying, as well as additional voices in English and Korean were provided by Madeline Reiter and Lee Bo-hee, respectively.

== Appearances ==
=== Guns Girl Z ===
In the game's original timeline, Bronya Zaychik is first introduced as a mecha pilot who chases two main characters of the game, Kiana Kaslana and Raiden Mei, on behalf of the company ME Corp. She pursues Mei but fails due to Kiana and Mei tracking her down and defeating her. Later on she teams up with Kiana and Mei and boards Hyperion, a flying battleship that belongs to the medieval organization Schicksal. The battleship is captained by Murata Himeko who believes them to be spies from rival organization Anti-Entropy. They are soon cleared of suspicion after Theresa Apocalypse, leader of Schicksal, recognizes Kiana's voice, and the three are brought into St. Freya High School, along with Bronya's fellow orphan, Sin Mal. Later while the school is attacked by Anti-Entropy, Bronya is hacked into her brain chip and tries to destroy the reactor of Hyperion, until Kiana hits her into unconsciousness as a safety measure. It was later found out through a brain scan that she was fighting against her will. During her fight against Anti-Entropy, it is revealed that her mother figure Cocolia, an Anti-Entropy officer, has been conducting experiments on her as part of a project to create humans with resistance to a destructive force known as the Honkai to survive the planned Final Eruption. (Note: In Guns Girl Z and Honkai Impact 3rd, an Eruption is a major Honkai outbreak characterized by a massive surge of Honkai energy in a localized area. This surge spawns numerous Honkai beasts and frequently gives birth to a Herrscher. Herrschers are superhuman beings transformed by the Honkai and they usually possess Herrscher cores, which serve as their power source.) Cocolia then asks Bronya to come back with her, but she refuses and decides to support Mei no matter what. Later it is revealed that Kiana had merged with the core of the Second Herrscher causing a Final Eruption. Kiana transforms and is now under the command of the Herrscher. She betrays her old allies and kills Bronya, Himeko, Theresa and another one of Bronya's fellow orphan Seele Vollerei. She then proceeds to destroy all life and ends the timeline. The world resets and a new timeline begins.

In the new timeline, Bronya is working for Anti-Entropy under Cocolia. She is known as the "Silver Wolf of the Urals". She meets Kiana and Mei for the first time as a sniper sent to capture the latter near Nagazora City. Later she catches them trying to steal an airship at a hangar and agrees to pilot them to Schicksal's headquarters. With Seele and Sin, she helps Kiana secretly save Theresa from Schicksal's headquarters. She then fights for Anti-Entropy in a large battle against Schicksal in Siberia. When Cocolia defects to Schicksal after finding out her dead biological daughter has been brought back as Ninti Apocalypse, Bronya is heartbroken but continues to fight with Sin and Seele. During the final battle at the Ark Fortress, Anti-Entropy's hidden base, Cocolia sacrifices herself to protect Bronya and the others from a Honkai beast.

Later, Bronya joins an expedition team to the Moon led by Dr. Yssring Leavtruth to battle against the source of the Honkai crisis coming from the Moon. Seele, Sin, Mei, her schoolmate Houraiji Kyuushou, and Ninti join her. During the expedition they suffer from hallucinations caused by the Will of Honkai, the mastermind of the Honkai. Ninti gets lost in space and Yssring suffers serious injuries after fighting alone to protect the ship. Bronya also suffers serious injuries after protecting Yssring during the crash landing on the Moon. Seele and Sin sacrifice themselves using their powers to explode the moon's core and seriously damage the Will of Honkai. Bronya, Kyuushou, Ninti and Yssring are revived in the new reality created by Kiana and Mei's power and fight in the final battle against the Will of Honkai. After the battle, Kiana and Mei leave to go to the Honkai's home universe to finally end the threat. Bronya suffers from grief after losing Seele and Sin but eventually sets up a new orphanage at the location of Cocolia's old base in Siberia.

=== Honkai Impact 3rd ===
==== Story ====
Bronya Zaychik (Black Nucleus battlesuit pictured)

Bronya Zaychik was born in Siberia to Alexei Zaitsev and Alexandra Zaychik. Her father was killed during the Second Eruption and her mother died shortly after giving birth to her. Taken in by mercenaries, she was trained as an assassin and gained the nickname "Silver Wolf of the Urals". She was sent to assassinate Cocolia, the head of an orphanage affiliated with the anti-Honkai organization Anti-Entropy, but failed. However, Cocolia decided to spare her life and allow her to stay at her orphanage. During her time there, she became close to a girl named Seele Vollerei. When Seele went missing during a dangerous experiment known as Project X-10, Bronya underwent the experiment to save her. However, she failed and suffered serious damage to her legs and the emotional portion of her brain. As a result, she could no longer walk without assistance and became emotionally numbed.

Bronya was later deployed to the city of Nagazora, where she met the game's main characters Kiana Kaslana and Raiden Mei. Her mission was to target Mei after Cocolia caused an Eruption awakening the Herrscher inside her. The three were rescued by military commander Murata Himeko and were subsequently enrolled at St. Freya High School to train as Valkyries. However, Bronya was remotely controlled by Cocolia, who implanted a biochip in Bronya's brain during Project X-10. This forced Bronya to attack Kiana and Mei; however they managed to overpower her and she regained control over herself. While in New Zealand, Bronya made friends with a Valkyrie named Wendy who had been implanted with a Herrscher core called the Gem of Desire. Cocolia used the biochip again to force Bronya to attack Wendy and capture Mei. During the rescue of Mei, Bronya faced off against Cocolia at the ME Corp headquarters and destroyed her own biochip, which put her in a coma.

Later, Bronya wakes up and joins Mei and St. Freya principal Theresa Apocalypse to fight against the Herrscher of the Void, who has possessed Kiana's body. When Cocolia comes to ask for help from the Hyperion crew to get back the Gem of Desire, Bronya agrees but questions Cocolia about the biochip. Later on, during an assault on the Deep in the Pacific Ocean, Bronya disobeys orders to retreat and jumps into the interdimensional realm called the Sea of Quanta. She is then sent by Joachim, a younger manifestation of Welt Yang, the current Herrscher of Reason, (Note: 理之律者; Lǐ zhī Lǜzhě) through bubble universes to test her will. She reunites with Seele who had been trapped there since Project X-10. After passing the trials, she inherits the Core of Reason from Welt, becoming the next Herrscher of Reason. As a result of the transformation, her damaged body was fully healed. She and Seele then escape to the real world.

While training at Anti-Entropy's Salt Lake base with Welt, Bronya is attacked by the Herrscher of Dominance. One of its puppets takes the Core of Reason's power in its pocket dimension. After Mei weakens the puppets from the outside, Bronya helps Kiana and St. Freya class monitor Fu Hua defeat the Herrscher. When Otto Apocalypse, the leader of the medieval anti-Honkai organization Schicksal, declares his plan to change history, Bronya's Herrscher powers are drained by an energy barrier that covered the town of Kolosten. She destroys the barrier by fusing her mind with the Core of Reason. During Project STIGMA, which was started by the rival organization World Serpent, on the Moon, Bronya and her group are trapped in memory fragments by World Serpent agent Hare. Realizing the true purpose of the Core of Reason was to serve humanity, Bronya escapes, absorbs the Core of Reason's collective consciousness to rebuild it and evolves into the Herrscher of Truth. She defeats Hare and says goodbye to Welt Joyce, the first Herrscher of Reason. Sometime later, Bronya works under Welt as an intern at the video game company Studio Reason.

Eight years later, Bronya is a video game producer and an acting leader to one of Schicksal's squads. She investigates creatures of the alien Sky People in the city of St. Fountain which leads her to discover that the sentient weapon Void Archives transformed into Otto's appearance.

==== Gameplay ====
Bronya has eleven different playable battlesuits, the most for any character in the game: Valkyrie Chariot, Snowy Sniper, Yamabuki Armor, Drive Kometa, Wolf's Dawn, Dimension Breaker, Black Nucleus, Herrscher of Reason, Haxxor Bunny, Silverwing: N-EX, and Herrscher of Truth.

Valkyrie Chariot is a B-rank Psychic-type battlesuit that unleashes a black hole with her ultimate and deals damage before exploding to stun nearby enemies. Snowy Sniper is an A-rank Biologic-type battlesuit that freezes nearby enemies through her evasion skill and ultimate. Yamabuki Armor is an A-rank Psychic-type battlesuit that can raise a shield to block incoming attacks and counter with a strike that paralyzes and slows nearby enemies. Its upgrade, Drive Kometa, retains the suit's rarity and type while introducing enhanced shielding mechanics. Wolf's Dawn is an A-rank Psychic-type battlesuit that grants her whole team an elemental shield that reduces incoming elemental damage. Dimension Breaker is an S-rank Mecha-type battlesuit that allows Project Bunny to attack autonomously through her ultimate. Black Nucleus is an S-rank Biologic-type battlesuit that features a corrupted version of Bronya, possesses a wide-area ultimate that hits enemies from all sides, and a stealth ability to move undetected. Herrscher of Reason is an upgraded battlesuit of Dimension Breaker that retains its rarity and type, and features an ultimate that transforms Project Bunny into an armed motorcycle with three unique skill effects. Haxxor Bunny is an A-rank Psychic-type battlesuit that can summon drones and activate her quick time event while off the field to support her teammates. Silverwing: N-EX is an S-rank Biologic-type battlesuit that deploys a special barrier to scatter her bullets and deal bonus Ice damage, while her ultimate fires an ice laser beam. Herrscher of Truth is an S-rank Imaginary-type battlesuit that deals Ice damage and alternates between two combat forms: one called Extremum which favors melee lance strikes and mecha-weapon combos, and another called Continuation which shifts to rifle fire and missile barrages.

=== Honkai: Star Rail ===
==== Story ====
Bronya Rand lives on a planet called Jarilo-VI, which has become encased in ice due to the presence of a Stellaron. A Stellaron is a mysterious object capable of causing massive changes to ecosystems and civilizations, as well as creating corruption referred to as "Fragmentum". She resides in Belobog, Jarilo-VI's largest city. Bronya was raised in an orphanage in Belobog's impoverished Underworld, where she was adopted at a young age by Cocolia, Belobog's Supreme Guardian, or ruler. Bronya becomes the commander of the Silvermane Guards, Belobog's security service. Players first see Bronya talking with Cocolia shortly before the arrival of the Trailblazer. Cocolia welcomes the group to the area, and seemed to want to eliminate the Stellaron; however, she secretly orders Bronya to arrest them. The next morning, Bronya leads the guards outside the Trailblazer's hotel in order to arrest them on Cocolia's orders, shocking the group. She chases the group into a restricted area corrupted with Fragmentum, resulting in an ambush. One of the Trailblazer's acquaintances, Sampo, uses a smoke bomb to knock everyone out, and Bronya, the Trailblazer and the rest of the group are taken to the Underworld.

In the Underworld, Bronya clashes with Seele, a member of the local organization Wildfire, which protects the area’s residents. Seele confronts Bronya about the poverty and suffering caused by the wealthy Overworld’s neglect of the Underworld. Bronya accompanies the Trailblazer and Seele to Rivet Town for medical supplies, where she visits an orphanage and helps a young child buy Geomarrow, an energy-producing ore used to heat and power Belobog. She realizes it is the same orphanage where she was raised before Cocolia adopted her, leading her to heavily question Cocolia's actions and the Underworld's suffering. It is revealed that Cocolia, under the Stellaron's influence, planned to destroy Belobog to create a better future, intending to banish researchers seeking to uncover the truth about the Stellaron and kill the Trailblazer and their friends when they try to neutralize the threat. Bronya returns to the Overworld ahead of the group to confront Cocolia, when she herself begins hearing the Stellaron's voice. Cocolia also intended to brainwash Bronya and have her succeed her as Supreme Guardian. Bronya resists the brainwashing attempt. After the pair finish combat, Cocolia frees herself from the Stellaron's influence. After the Stellaron tries to possess Bronya instead, Cocolia manages to hold it back to protect her from its influence, at the cost of her own life. After Cocolia's death, Bronya, now the new Supreme Guardian, chooses not to reveal her adoptive mother's corruption to the public; instead, she announces that Cocolia died bravely while fighting the Stellaron. As the new Supreme Guardian, she unifies Belobog and reopens the passage between the Overworld and the Underworld.

==== Gameplay ====
Bronya is a 5-star rarity character who deals Wind damage and walks the Path of Harmony. (Note: In Honkai: Star Rail, a Path defines a character's combat role and design philosophy. Characters on the Path of Harmony typically focus on applying buffs to allies.) She uses a rifle with bayonet to shoot at enemies. Bronya's basic attack deals Wind damage to a single enemy and also activates her Talent, which makes her next action occur sooner in the game's turn order. Her Skill dispels a debuff from an ally character and also advances her next action in the turn order. Additionally, this increases her damage for the next action. Her ultimate boosts the attack and critical damage statistics of ally characters for two turns.

Players can also face her as a boss in both the game's main story and Simulated Universe combat mode.

== Reception ==
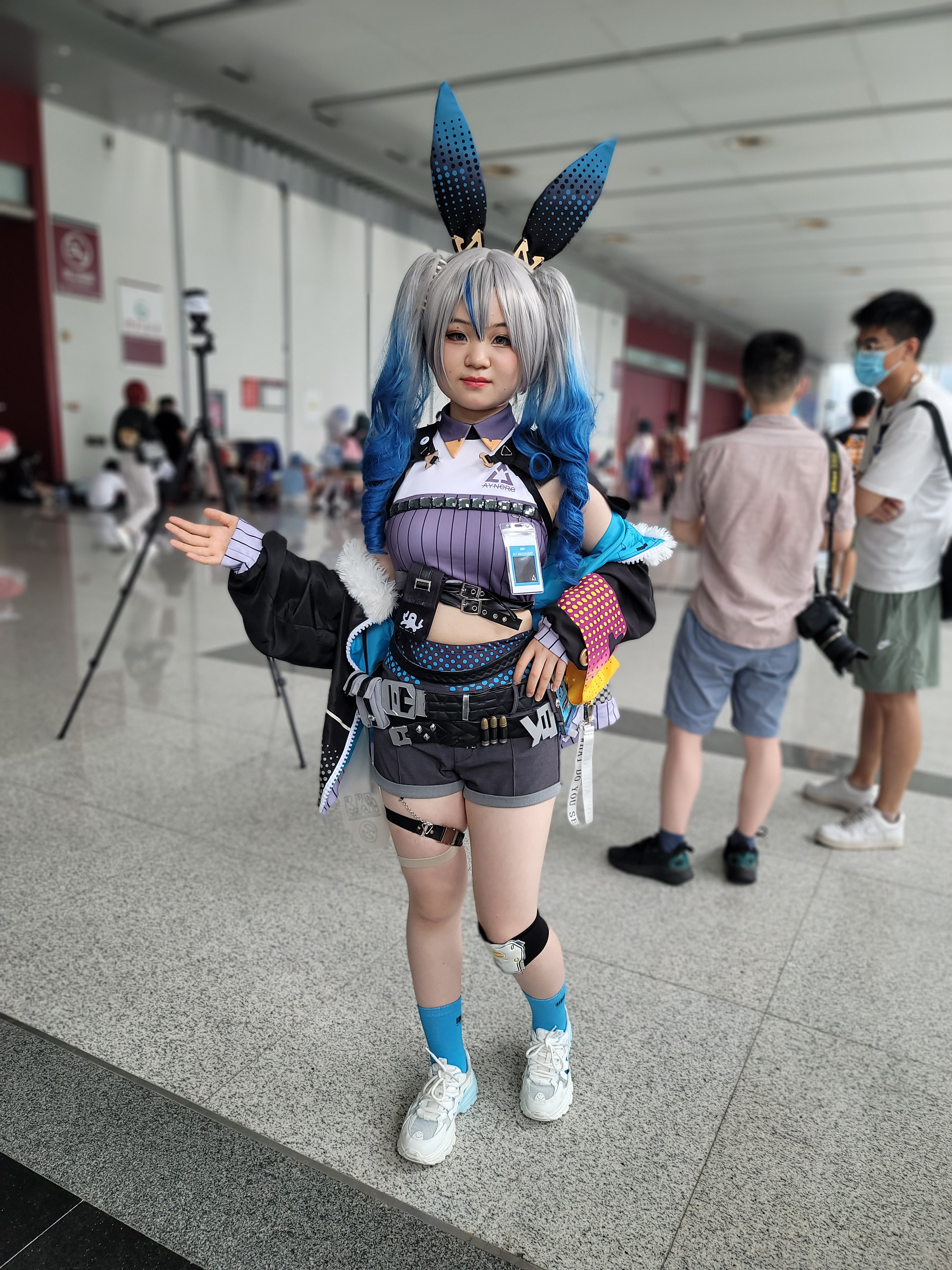
Cosplay of Bronya Zaychik in Qingdao, China

Bronya was generally received well by players, who expressed their love for the character via cosplay.

Writer Yan Ku of Yahoo News wrote that Bronya was "that one character that HoYoverse almost always exports into their games". She argued that the company was showing favoritism for Bronya over other characters, using the fact that the number of battlesuits released for Bronya in Honkai Impact 3rd was the most (eleven) for any character. The game's main protagonist, Kiana Kaslana, for comparison, only had eight battlesuits for players to choose from. Ku characterized Bronya Rand as very similar to the aged-up version of Bronya Zaychik seen in the Honkai Impact 3rd quest A Post Honkai Odyssey 2. She speculated that a version of the character (also known as an expy may appear as the Tsaritsa in Genshin Impact, one of miHoYo's other games. Ku said that although Bronya Rand was different from the original in that she was no longer the Herrscher of Reason, Bronya was still faced with a "mighty destiny" in becoming Belobog's Supreme Guardian. Ku compared Bronya Zaychik with her Star Rail counterpart in that they are both powerful, resolved, dedicated, and protective people. Ku also indicated that Bronya Rand was the adult version of the character, contrasting it with the younger, twin-tailed appearance Bronya has in Honkai Impact 3rd's main storyline. Yuki Kawasaki of Real Sound compared the two; in Honkai Impact 3rd Cocolia and Bronya go their separate ways. Even in the parallel universe in which Honkai: Star Rail is set, their fate remains the same and their relationship is torn apart.

Commentators have characterized Bronya as a highly capable figure who ultimately develops into a selfless ruler. Kawasaki described Bronya's decision to oppose her own mother as "nothing short of a tragedy", particularly because their relationship would have likely remained harmonious under ordinary circumstances. The story acknowledges that the future of Belobog will likely be difficult and that there was little reason for optimism about Belobog and its continuing hardships. They compared Bronya's development to that of Miach Mihie in the 2015 film Harmony and stated that rather than prioritizing individualism, both characters direct their attention toward society as a whole. After the battle with Cocolia, Bronya prepares to assume the position of Supreme Guardian and devotes herself tirelessly to the citizens of Belobog, and she debates municipal policy with Seele, who understands the concerns of ordinary residents and effectively becomes Bronya's right-hand woman. Ken Allsop of PCGamesN observed that Bronya possesses a form of selflessness distinct from Cocolia's, although her rebellious streak may partly stem from her close relationship with Seele, who is seen fighting alongside her in one of Seele's promotional trailers. Despite the difficult future awaiting Belobog, Bronya inspires strong loyalty from players. Kawasaki declared that if the Trailblazer's assistance could reverse Belobog's fortunes, they would gladly come back to help as many times as necessary.

Commentators have also focused on Bronya's relationship with Seele across both Honkai: Star Rail and Honkai Impact 3rd. Ku argued that Bronya Rand resembles her Honkai Impact 3rd counterpart most clearly in her relationships with other characters, observing that the earlier Bronya's connection with Seele Vollerei is reflected in the budding relationship between Bronya and Honkai: Star Rail's older version of Seele by the conclusion of the Belobog storyline. Allsop highlighted Bronya's appearance alongside Seele in the latter's character trailer, noting that the reunion of the Honkai series' "iconic duo" particularly excited longtime fans of the franchise. He cited one fan's comment that seeing "Seele being with Bronya in every universe" was heartwarming, before joking that historians would regard them as merely "really good friends". According to Vikki Blake of Eurogamer, the two have also been described by fans as a power couple. An anonymous writer for 4Gamer also praised the way Bronya, an upper-class soldier, and Seele, a resistance fighter from the impoverished Underworld, gradually open up to one another, describing their developing bond as "truly precious".
