= Kana Asumi =

Japanese actress (born 1983)

- 阿澄 佳奈
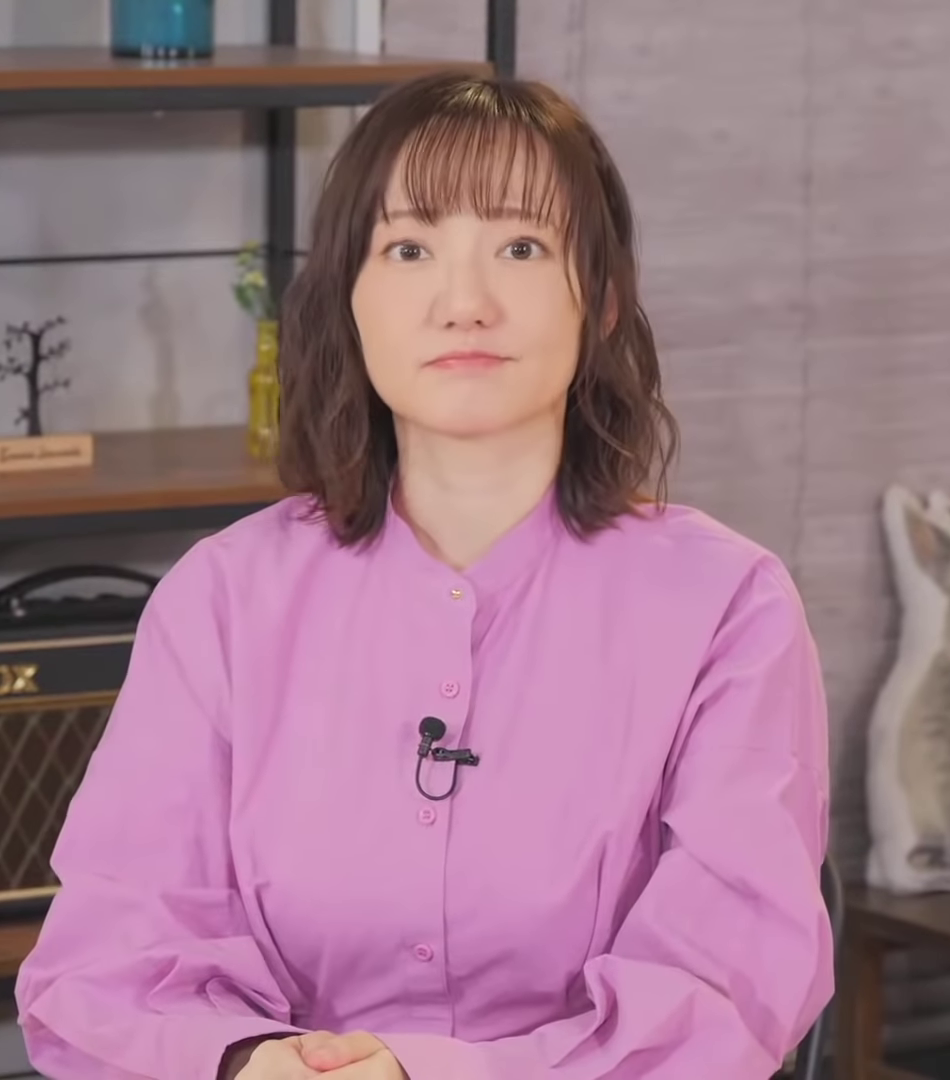
- Kana Asumi in 2021
- Born: Kana Harada; August 12, 1983 (age 43); Fukuoka Prefecture, Japan
- Occupations: Actress; voice actress; singer
- Years active: 1999–present
- Agent: 81 Produce
- Notable work: Honkai Impact 3rd as Bronya Zaychik and PROMETHEUS; Honkai: Star Rail as Bronya Rand and Silver Wolf; Non Non Biyori as Komari Koshigaya; Encouragement of Climb as Hinata Kuraue; Working!! as Popura Taneshima; Nyaruko: Crawling with Love as Nyaruko; Blue Archive as Kuda Izuna
- Children: 1

Kana Asumi (阿澄 佳奈, Asumi Kana; born August 12, 1983) is a Japanese voice actress and singer. She began her voice acting career in 2005 and was a member of the girl group Lisp from 2010 to 2011.

== Career ==
She worked for Voice & Heart until 2007 and has worked for 81 Produce since 2008. She won the Best Lead Actress Award in the 7th Seiyu Awards.

== Personal life ==
On January 14, 2014, Asumi announced her marriage on her blog. In 2022, she announced the birth of her first child via her Twitter account.

== Filmography ==
=== Anime television series ===
2005

- Canvas 2: Nijiiro no Sketch – Waitress (ep 3), Choir member (ep 21)

2007

- Hidamari Sketch – Yuno
- Tengen Toppa Gurren Lagann – Kiyal
- Shinkyoku Sōkai Polyphonica – Policewoman Kusunome (ep 11)
- Bokurano – Kana Ushiro
- Shugo Chara! – Ran
- Prism Ark – Bridget

2008

- Rosario + Vampire – Sumae Mizuno (ep 11)
- Persona: Trinity Soul – Megumi Kayano
- Aria the Origination – Anzu (ep 4)
- Sekirei – Yukari Sahashi
- Rosario + Vampire Capu2 – Sumae Mizuno
- Toradora! – Sakura Kanō
- Hell Girl: Three Vessels – Shina Tamayo
- Shugo Chara! Doki – Ran
- Kyo no Go no Ni – Natsumi Hirakawa
- Hidamari Sketch x365 – Yuno

2009

- Hayate no Gotoku Season 2 – Fumi Hibino, Shiranui
- Kämpfer – Mikoto Kondou
- Umi Monogatari: Anata ga Ite Kureta Koto – Marin
- A Certain Magical Index – Hyoka Kazakiri
- Shugo Chara Party! – Ran
- Saint Seiya: The Lost Canvas – Agasha

2010

- Hidamari Sketch Hoshimittsu – Yuno
- Tales of Phantasia: Narikiri Dungeon X – Mel
- Angel Beats! – Irie
- Working!! – Popura Taneshima
- Maid Sama! – Honoka
- Amagami SS – Miya Tachibana
- Black Rock Shooter – Yuu/Strength
- MM! – Shizuka Sado
- Tamayura – Kaoru Hanawa
- Haiyoru! Nyaruani – Nyaruko
- Haiyoru! Nyaruani: Remember My Mr. Lovecraft – Nyaruko
- The World God Only Knows – Chihiro Kosaka
- Nura: Rise of the Yokai Clan – Saori Maki

2011

- Astarotte no Omocha – Dora
- C³ – Kana Miyama
- Dog Days – Yukikaze Panetone
- Hidamari Sketch x SP – Yuno
- Jormungand – Liliane
- Kämpfer fur die Liebe – Mikoto Kondou
- Mayo Chiki! – Nakuru Narumi
- Nura: Rise of the Yokai Clan (Demon Capital) – Saori Maki
- Nurse Love Syndrome - Kaori Sawai
- Pretty Rhythm: Aurora Dream – Aira Harune
- Tamayura – Kaoru Hanawa
- The World God Only Knows II – Chihiro Kosaka
- A Certain Magical Index II – Hyoka Kazakiri
- Working!! – Popura Taneshima

2012

- Amagami SS+ plus – Miya Tachibana
- Black Rock Shooter – Yū Kōtari, Strength
- Busou Shinki Moon Angel – Arnval Mk.2/Kaguya/01
- Busou Shinki Anime television series – Arnval Mk.2/Ann
- Medaka Box Abnormal – Mizō Yukuhashi
- Dog Days' – Yukikaze Panetone
- Nyaruko: Crawling with Love – Nyarlathotep/Nyaruko
- Hayate the Combat Butler: Can't Take My Eyes Off You – Fumi Hibino
- Pretty Rhythm: Dear My Future – Aira Harune
- Hidamari Sketch Honeycomb – Yuno
- Ebiten: Kōritsu Ebisugawa Kōkō Tenmonbu – Todayama Kyouko
- Waiting in the Summer – Mio Kitahara

2013

- Dog & Scissors – Madoka Harumi
- Devil Survivor 2: The Animation – Airi Ban
- Nyaruko: Crawling with Love W – Nyaruko
- Sasami-san@Ganbaranai – Sasami Tsukuyomi
- Encouragement of Climb – Hinata Kuraue
- Magi: The Labyrinth of Magic – Toto
- Hayate the Combat Butler: Cuties – Fumi Hibino
- Gargantia on the Verdurous Planet – Melty
- Boku no Imōto wa "Ōsaka Okan" – Namika Ishihara
- Hyperdimension Neptunia: The Animation – White Heart/Blanc
- The World God Only Knows: Goddess Saga – Chihiro Kosaka
- Puella Magi Madoka Magica the Movie: Rebellion – Nagisa Momoe
- Hidamari Sketch: Sae & Hiro's Graduation Arc – Yuno
- Non Non Biyori – Komari Koshigaya
- Unbreakable Machine-Doll – Frey
- Wanna Be the Strongest in the World! – Elena Miyazawa

2014

- If Her Flag Breaks – Kikuno Shōkanji
- Nisekoi – Marika Tachibana
- Mekakucity Actors – Ene/Takane Enomoto
- Nanana's Buried Treasure – Tensai Ikkyū
- Strike the Blood – Reina Akatsuki
- Girl Friend Beta – Michiru Tomura
- Witch Craft Works – Touko Hio
- Pretty Rhythm: All-Star Selection – Aira Harune
- Encouragement of Climb: Second Season – Hinata Kuraue
- Hanamonogatari – Numachi Rōka

2015

- Classroom Crisis – Yuna Nouen
- Cross Ange – Aura Midgardia
- Dog Days" – Yukikaze Panetone
- Haiyore! Nyaruko-san F – Nyaruko
- Magical Girl Lyrical Nanoha ViVid – Chantez Arpinion
- Miss Monochrome: The Animation 2 – Yayoi Konno
- Nisekoi: – Marika Tachibana
- Non Non Biyori Repeat – Komari Koshigaya
- Star-Myu: High School Star Musical – Yuki Nayuki
- Working!!! – Popura Taneshima

2016

- Divine Gate – Sylph
- Nisekoi: OVA – Marika Tachibana
- High School Fleet – Minami Kaburagi
- Love Live! Sunshine!! – Shima Takami
- Regalia: The Three Sacred Stars – Noa Kleis

2017

- Kamiwaza Wanda - Amazing
- Pretty Cure Dream Stars! – Sakura
- Star-Myu: High School Star Musical 2 – Yuki Nayuki

2018

- Kiratto Pri☆Chan – Aira Nanahoshi, Aira Harune (ep 118)
- Island – Karen Kurutsu
- Grand Blue Dreaming – Aina Yoshiwara
- Senran Kagura: Shinovi Master – Fubuki
- Encouragement of Climb: Third Season – Hinata Kuraue

2019

- Boogiepop and Others – Kotoe Kinugawa
- Star-Myu: High School Star Musical 3 - Yuuki Nayuki
- 7 Seeds – Matsuri Tendō

2020

- Kuma Kuma Kuma Bear – Atora
- Princess Connect! Re:Dive – Rino

2021

- Hortensia Saga – Lacroix
- Idoly Pride – Radio host, leader of Growing July
- Non Non Biyori Nonstop – Komari Koshigaya
- The Way of the Househusband – Yuriko (ep 9)

2022

- Princess Connect! Re:Dive Season 2 – Rino
- Miss Shachiku and the Little Baby Ghost – Ryōko
- Encouragement of Climb: Next Summit – Hinata Kuraue

2023

- Yohane the Parhelion: Sunshine in the Mirror – Shima

2024

- Gushing over Magical Girls – Vatz
- 365 Days to the Wedding – Natsumi Komiya

2025

- Princession Orchestra – Kaede Sato

=== Anime film ===
2020

- High School Fleet: The Movie as Minami Kaburagi

=== Dubbing ===
- Evil Dead – Teenager

=== Drama CD ===
- My Little Monster (Tonari no Kaibutsu-kun) – Yū Miyama
- Ultimate Otaku Teacher (Denpa Kyōshi) – Suzune Kagami
- Etrian Odyssey – Tlachtga/Tsusukuru

=== Variety shows ===
- Korenande Shoukai – Madanai

=== Video games ===
- Busou Shinki Battle Rondo (2007) – Arnval/Arnval Mk.2
- Rune Factory Frontier (2008) – Anette
- Busou Shinki Battle Masters (2010) – Arnval Mk.2
- Hyperdimension Neptunia series (2010-) – Blanc/White Heart/Next White, Dark White
- Solatorobo (2010) – Chocolat Gelato
- Devil Survivor Overclocked (2011) – Midori Komaki
- Marvel vs. Capcom 3: Fate of Two Worlds (2011) – Felicia
- Ultimate Marvel vs. Capcom 3 (2011) – Felicia
- Otomedius Excellent (2011) – Arnval, Ruby
- Magical Girl Lyrical Nanoha A's Portable: The Gears of Destiny (2011) – Unbreakable Dark, Isis Egret
- Fire Emblem Awakening (2012) – Lissa
- Guilty Crown: Lost Christmas (2012) – Carol
- Phantasy Star Online 2 (2012) – Patty
- Summon Night 5 (2013) – Spinel
- Ren'ai Kilometer Portable (2013) – Moe Osawa
- Shin Sekaiju no Meikyū: Millennium no Shōjo (2013) – Tsusukuru/Tlachtga
- Devil Survivor 2 Break Record (2015) – Airi Ban
- Guns Girl School Dayz (2015) – Kiana Kaslana (on version 1.3) Bronya Zaychik (on version 1.5)
- Project X Zone 2 (2015) – Felicia
- Island (2016) – Karen Kurutsu
- Gundam Breaker 3 (2016) – Mochizuki
- Genkai Tokki: Seven Pirates (2016) – Jewel
- Fire Emblem Heroes (2017) – Lissa
- Fate/Grand Order (2017) – Chacha
- Honkai Impact 3rd (2017) – Bronya Zaychik, Prometheus
- Shinobi Master Senran Kagura: New Link (2017) – Fubuki
- Princess Connect! Re:Dive (2018) – Rino
- Magia Record (2018)– Nagisa Momoe
- Azur Lane (2018) – Blanc/White Heart, An Shan, Fu Shun, Fubuki
- Atelier Lulua: The Scion of Arland (2019) – Eva Armster
- Da Capo 4 (2019) – Hiyori Shirakawa
- Another Eden (2019) – Myrus
- Grand Chase Dimensional Chaser (2020) – Io Jupiter
- Arknights (2020) – Snowsant
- Guardian Tales (2020) – Mayreel
- Blue Archive (2021) – Kuda Izuna
- Monster Hunter Rise (2021) – Yomogi the Chef
- Counter:Side (2022) – Sigma
- Honkai: Star Rail (2023) – Bronya Rand, Silver Wolf
- Teppen (2023) Ruiner Felicia
- Ys X: Nordics (2023) – Mirabel Asarad
- Atelier Yumia: The Alchemist of Memories & the Envisioned Land as Flammi
