= Manta Aisora =

Japanese writer

Manta Aisora (Japanese: 逢空万太) (3 October 1981 in Sapporo) is a Japanese writer. He is best known for the series Haiyore! Nyaruko-san which was adapted into anime.

In 2012 he was awarded the 1st Prize awarded by GA Bunko for Yumemiru mama ni machi itari (夢見 る ま ま に 待 ち い た り) for one of the novels in the Haiyore! Nyaruko-san series.

== Works ==
- Haiyore! Nyaruko-san (這いよれ! ニャル子さん)
- Miyama-san chi no bretein (深山さんちのベルテイン)
- Valkyrie Works (ヴァルキリーワークス)
- Yūsha ga maō o taoshite kurenai (勇者が魔王を倒してくれない)
