= Miyu Matsuki =

Japanese voice actress (1977–2015)

- 松来 未祐
- Born: Mieko Matsuki; September 14, 1977; Kure, Hiroshima, Japan
- Died: October 27, 2015 (aged 38); Tokyo, Japan
- Occupations: Voice actress; singer
- Years active: 1998–2015
- Agent: 81 Produce
- Notable work: Hayate the Combat Butler as Isumi Saginomiya; Nyaruko: Crawling with Love as Kūko; Shimoneta as Anna Nishikinomiya
- Height: 151 cm (4 ft 11 in)

Mieko Matsuki (Japanese: 松木 美愛子, Hepburn: Matsuki Mieko; September 14, 1977 – October 27, 2015), better known by her stage name Miyu Matsuki (Japanese: 松来 未祐, Hepburn: Matsuki Miyu), was a Japanese voice actress and singer from Kure, Hiroshima, best known for her work in anime. She was affiliated with 81 Produce at the time of her death.

== Death ==
Matsuki announced on July 14, 2015, that she was undergoing treatment for acute pneumonia. She died on October 27, 2015, in Tokyo from lymphoma caused by chronic active EBV infection. At the time of her death, she was cast as Charlotte Dimandias in the anime Hundred. Her scheduled and ongoing roles were taken over by Yui Horie, Yumi Kakazu, Reina Ueda and Noriko Shitaya.

A charity event in her honour was held on September 11, 2016, at the Science Museum Hall in Chiyoda Ward, Tokyo, Japan. The 39! Miyu-chan event organized by her friends and colleagues had its proceeds go towards CAEBV research and related medical causes.

== Filmography ==
=== TV anime ===
- Ayakashi as Hime Yakushiji
- ARIA The NATURAL as Ayano (ep 4)
- Binchō-tan as Pukashū
- Carnival Phantasm as Hisui
- Chibi Maruko-chan as Koharu Nagayama (Second)
- Claymore as Flora
- D.C. ~Da Capo~ as Yoriko Sagisawa
- D.C.S.S. ~Da Capo Second Season~ as Misaki Sagisawa
- D-Frag! as Fukuko Nishinaga
- Divergence Eve as Kotoko-01
- Dog Days as Evita Sales
- Dragon Drive as Sue
- Fafner in the Azure as Shōko Hazama
- Fate/kaleid liner Prisma Illya as Magical Sapphire
- Final Approach as Akane Mizuhara
- Fullmetal Alchemist as Sister (ep 16)
- Fushigiboshi no Futagohime Gyu! as Fran
- Futari wa Pretty Cure Splash Star as Choppy
- Glass Mask as Asako Hayagawa (ep 22)
- Haibane Renmei as Haibane of Abandoned Factory
- Nyaruko: Crawling with Love as Kūko
- Hanbun no Tsuki ga Noboru Sora as Sayoko Natsume (ep 5,6)
- Hand Maid May as Mie
- Hayate no Gotoku! as Isumi Saginomiya
- Hidamari Sketch as Yoshinoya
- Hit wo Nerae! as Natsumi Yagami
- Isekai no Seikishi Monogatari as Flora Nanadan
- Kagihime Monogatari Eikyū Alice Rondo as Kisa Misaki
- Kakyuusei as female student (ep 9); Mahoko's friend (ep 5)
- Koi Kaze as Nanoka Kohinata (baby)
- Konjiki no Gash Bell!! as Princess Pear
- Kotori Samba as Merōnya
- LOVE♥LOVE? as Natsumi Yagami
- Magical Girl Lyrical Nanoha as Shinobu Tsukimura
- Magical Girl Lyrical Nanoha A's as Lieze Lotte
- MÄR as Chaton
- Maria Holic as Ayari Shiki
- Memories Off 2nd as Kana Maikata
- Mezzo as Asami Igarashi
- Mirmo Zibang! as Pikumo (Gaia Team)
- Misaki Chronicles as Kotoko-02
- Tsukuyomi -Moon Phase- as Kaoru Midō
- Nakoruru as Mikato
- Onegai My Melody as Aya Arai
- Onegai My Melody: KuruKuru Shuffle! as Aya Arai
- Onegai My Melody: Sukkiri as Aya Arai
- Otome wa Boku ni Koishiteru as Shion Jūjō
- Pani Poni Dash! as Media
- Pocket Monsters Best Wishes! Season 2 as Cattleya
- Romeo x Juliet as Cordelia
- Rune Soldier as Anna
- Ryūsei Sentai Musumet as Nako Seijō
- Saki as Ichigo Sasano
- Sayonara Zetsubou Sensei as Harumi Fujiyoshi
- SD Gundam Force as Lilijimarna Miya Do Lacroa
- Seven of Seven as Hitomi Onodera
- Shimoneta as Anna Nishikinomiya
- Simoun as Anguras (ep 8,17,18)
- Soukou no Strain as Jesse Iges
- Strawberry Panic! as Hikari Konohana
- Tactics as Miyabi Suzakuin (ep 10,11)
- Tamayura as Chimo Yakusa
- The Cosmopolitan Prayers as Koto Hoshino / Mikorayer
- The Third as Fairy (ep 13,14,16)
- Tokimeki Memorial ~Only Love~ as Koayu Utsumi
- True Love Story as Yuiko Shinosaka
- W~Wish as Tomo Kishida
- Yami to Bōshi to Hon no Tabibito as Milka

=== Film ===
- Pretty Cure All Stars as Choppy
- Futari wa PreCure Splash☆Star the Movie: Tic-Tac Crisis Hanging by a Thin Thread! as Choppy
- Hayate the Combat Butler! Heaven Is a Place on Earth as Isumi Saginomiya
- Jewelpet the Movie: Sweets Dance Princess as Macaronia
- Major The Movie: Winning Shot of Friendship as Akihiko Sano
- Yasai no Yousei: N.Y. Salad as White Eggplant

=== Video games ===
- Akai Ito as Kei Hatō
- Atelier Iris 3: Grand Phantasm as Iris Fortner
- Castlevania Judgment as Maria Renard
- Dungeon Travelers 2 as Maid-Sensei
- Elsword as Ariel
- Final Approach as Akane Mizuhara
- Grand Chase as Arme Glenstid
- Kashimashi ~Girl Meets Girl~ The First Summer Story as Kakeno Mine
- Melty Blood as Hisui and MECH-Hisui
- Musashi: Samurai Legend as Licotta
- Mai-HiME: Unmei no Keitōju as Sakuya Amakawa
- Phantom Breaker as Waka Kumon
- Sentimental Prelude as Saori Shinohara
- Solatorobo: Red the Hunter as Flo Financier
- Strawberry Panic! as Hikari Konohana
- Persona 5 (Chihaya Mifune)
- Power DoLLS 1 as Azusa Yumi (operator)
- Super Robot Wars Alpha 3 as Minaki Tōmine
- Super Robot Wars UX (Shōko Hazama)
- Tales of Zestiria (Lailah)
- True Love Story -Summer Days, and yet... as Yuiko Shinosaka
- The Legend of Heroes: Trails of Cold Steel as Claire Rieveldt
