= Yuka Ōtsubo =

Japanese voice actress and singer

- 大坪 由佳
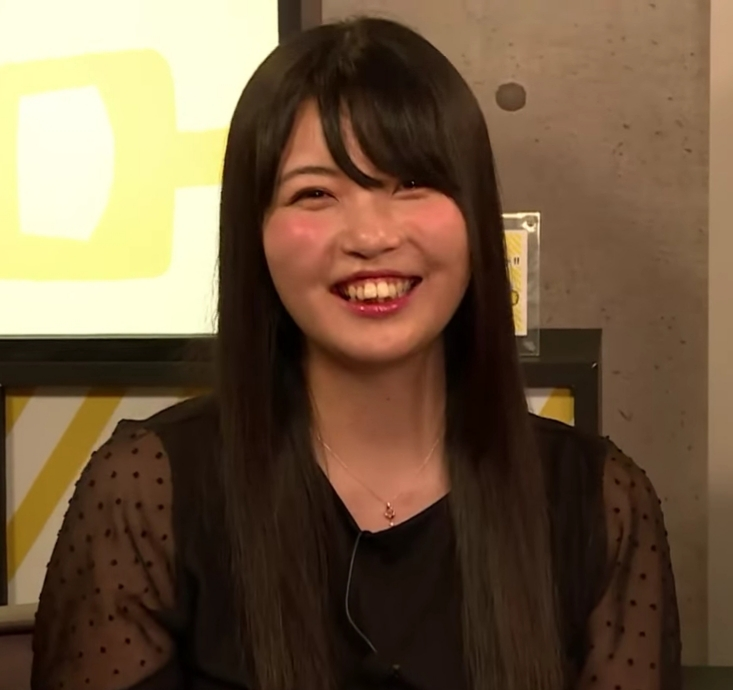
- Ōtsubo in July 2018
- Born: June 11, 1993 (age 33); Chiba Prefecture, Japan
- Occupations: Voice actress; singer
- Years active: 2011–present
- Agent: Early Wing
- Notable work: YuruYuri as Kyōko Toshinō; Umamusume: Pretty Derby as Taiki Shuttle; The Idolmaster Cinderella Girls as Kanako Mimura; Kantai Collection as Kitakami; Nyaruko: Crawling with Love as Tamao Kurei and Ōi; Wake Up, Girls! as Shiho Iwasaki
- Height: 165.5 cm (5 ft 5 in)

Yuka Ōtsubo (大坪 由佳, Ōtsubo Yuka; born June 11, 1993) is a Japanese voice actress and singer from Chiba Prefecture affiliated with Early Wing. In 2014, she started her career as a singer by joining the band SmileY inc. with Vocaloid musician Yuuyu-P. She also did the voice of Vocaloid character Azuki Masaoka for V4.

== Filmography ==
=== Anime ===
2011

- YuruYuri as Kyōko Toshinō

2012

- Nyaruko: Crawling with Love as Tamao Kurei
- Pretty Rhythm: Dear My Future as Yumemi
- Yuruyuri♪♪ as Kyōko Toshinō
- Say I Love You as Female Student
- The Pet Girl of Sakurasou as Otoha Nakano
- Shirokuma Cafe as Yamārashi Fan Club member

2013

- Ai Mai Mi as Ai Ebihara
- Oreshura as Mei Akano
- Vividred Operation as Wakaba Saegusa
- Nyaruko: Crawling with Love W as Tamao Kurei
- Futari wa Milky Holmes as White Phantom
- Chuunibyou demo Koi ga Shitai! Koi Lite as Mika-chan
- I Want to Be the Strongest in the World! as Nanami Kanno
- My Girlfriend and Childhood Friend are Too Much as Mei Akano, Female staff, female student A

2014

- Go! Go! 575 as Azuki Masaoka
- Inugami-san to Nekoyama-san as Aki Hiiragi
- No-Rin as Akari Suzuki
- Wake Up, Girls! as Shiho Iwasaki
- Riddle Story of Devil as Mahiru / Shinya Banba
- Hanayamata as Tami Nishimikado
- Momo Kyun Sword as Karin
- Aimaimy ~Mousou Catastrophe~ as Ai and Macaron-chan
- YuruYuri Nachuyachu-mi! as Kyoko Osame

2015

- Kantai Collection as Kitakami, Ōi
- The Idolmaster Cinderella Girls as Kanako Mimura
- The Idolmaster Cinderella Girls 2nd Season as Kanako Mimura
- YuruYuri San☆Hai! as Kyōko Toshinō
- YuruYuri Nachuyachumi! + as Kyōko Toshinō
- Nyaruko-san F as Tamao Kurei
- Mysterious Somera-chan as Mari Miyamoto

2016

- Hundred as Latia Saint-Émilion
- Tsukiuta. The Animation as Matsuri Motomiya
- Scorching Hot Ping Pong Girl as Tanpopo Taguchi and Kimiko Hanashi
- Kantai Collection the Movie as Kako Furutaka, Kitakami, Ōi
- CHAIN CHRONICLE Haecceitas no Hikari as Roro

2017

- The Idolmaster Cinderella Girls Theater as Kanako Mimura (4 seasons from April 2017-June 2019)
- Love Tyrant as Mari Shiina
- Tsugumomo as Misako Misago and Yuu Kosakabe

2018

- Caligula as Thorn
- Umamusume: Pretty Derby as Taiki Shuttle
- Citrus as Manami

2019

- Why the Hell are You Here, Teacher!? as Saya Matsukaze

2020

- Princess Connect! Re:Dive as Shinobu / Shinobu Kamiki
- The Eighth Son? That Can't Be True! as Oscar
- Umayon as Taiki Shuttle

2021

- Hortensia Saga as Bernadetta Ober
- Tropical-Rouge! Pretty Cure as Kakuta Masami
- Symbiote Part as Hari

2022

- Girls' Frontline as Intruder
- Princess Connect! Re:Dive Season 2 as Shinobu / Shinobu Kamiki
- Shadowverse FLAME as Shinobu Miki

2026

- Cosmic Princess Kaguya! as additional voice (Girl in the train).

=== Video games ===
- Onsen Musume as Aloha Iwaki
- Caligula as Thorn
- Hyperdevotion Noire: Goddess Black Heart as Lee Fey
- The Idolmaster Cinderella Girls as Kanako Mimura
- Kantai Collection as Ise, Hyuuga, Furutaka, Kako, Ōi, Kitakami, Hiyou, Junyou, Hiburi, Daitou
- Magia Record as Corbeau
- Sakura-sō no Pet na Kanojo as Otoha Nakano
- Lilycle Rainbow Stage!!! as Ibuki Oribe
- Pokémon Masters as Leaf
- Princess Connect! Re:Dive as Shinobu / Shinobu Kamiki
- Yoru, Tomosu as Reiko Takusari
- Girls' Frontline as SPP-1, Type 97S, Architect, Intruder
- Umamusume: Pretty Derby as Taiki Shuttle
- Blue Archive as Ayumu Iwabitsu
- World Flipper as Mia
- 100% Orange Juice as Sweet Creator
- Reverse: 1999 as Kaalaa Baunaa

=== Dubbing ===
==== Animation ====
- The Haunted House (Tooniverse) – Hari Koo/Koo Hari
