= Nyaruko: Crawling with Love =

Japanese light novel series & its adaptations

- Cover of first light novel volume featuring the protagonist, Nyaruko

這いよれ! ニャル子さん (Haiyore! Nyaruko-san)
- Genre: Romantic comedy
- Light novel
- Written by: Manta Aisora
- Illustrated by: Koin
- Published by: SB Creative
- Imprint: GA Bunko
- Magazine: GA Magazine
- Original run: April 15, 2009 – March 17, 2014
- Volumes: 12
- Original video animation

Haiyore! Nyaruko-san
- Directed by: Azuma Tani
- Written by: Manta Aisora
- Studio: DLE
- Released: October 23, 2009 – March 15, 2010
- Episodes: 9
- Anime television series

Haiyore! Nyaruko: Remember My Mr. Lovecraft
- Directed by: Azuma Tani
- Written by: Azuma Tani; Manta Aisora
- Studio: DLE
- Original network: BS11 Digital, AT-X
- Original run: December 11, 2010 – February 26, 2011
- Episodes: 11 + OVA
- Manga
- Written by: Manta Aisora
- Illustrated by: Kei Okazaki
- Published by: Shueisha
- Magazine: Miracle Jump
- Original run: May 6, 2011 – April 10, 2013
- Volumes: 2
- Manga

Haiyore! Super Nyaruko-chan Time
- Written by: Manta Aisora
- Illustrated by: Sōichirō Hoshino
- Published by: Flex Comix
- Magazine: Flex Comix Blood
- Original run: October 5, 2011 – November 12, 2014
- Volumes: 5
- Anime television series
- Directed by: Tsuyoshi Nagasawa
- Written by: Noboru Kimura
- Music by: Monaca
- Studio: Xebec
- Licensed by: NA: NIS America
- Original network: TV Tokyo, AT-X, TV Aichi, TVO
- Original run: April 10, 2012 – June 26, 2012
- Episodes: 12 + OVA
- Anime television series

Haiyore! Nyaruko-san W
- Directed by: Tsuyoshi Nagasawa
- Written by: Noboru Kimura
- Music by: Monaca
- Studio: Xebec
- Licensed by: NA: NIS America
- Original network: TV Tokyo, AT-X, TV Aichi, TVO
- Original run: April 8, 2013 – July 1, 2013
- Episodes: 12 + OVA
- Video game

Haiyore! Nyaruko-san Meijōshigatai Game no Yōna Mono
- Developer: 5pb.
- Publisher: 5pb.
- Genre: Adventure
- Platform: PlayStation Vita
- Released: May 30, 2013
- Original video animation

Haiyore! Nyaruko-san F
- Directed by: Tsuyoshi Nagasawa
- Written by: Noboru Kimura
- Music by: Monaca
- Studio: Xebec
- Released: June 19, 2015
- Runtime: 27 minutes
- icon

Nyaruko: Crawling with Love (這いよれ! ニャル子さん, Haiyore! Nyaruko-san; lit. 'Crawl Up! Nyaruko-san'), also known as Nyaruko-san: Another Crawling Chaos, is a Japanese light novel series written by Manta Aisora and illustrated by Koin. It was inspired by H. P. Lovecraft's Cthulhu Mythos. The series' twelve volumes were published by Soft Bank Creative under their GA Bunko imprint between April 2009 and March 2014.

An animated original video animation (OVA) by DLE titled Haiyore! Nyaruko was published in between October 2009 and March 2010, followed by a television series, Haiyore! Nyaruko: Remember My Mr. Lovecraft, which aired in Japan between December 2010 and February 2011. An anime television series by Xebec aired in Japan between April and June 2012 and a second season aired between April and June 2013. An OVA was released in 2015. Two manga adaptations have been produced. A video game adaptation, developed by 5pb. for PlayStation Vita was released in Japan in May 2013.

== Synopsis ==
The story of Haiyore! Nyaruko-san centers around Nyaruko, a formless Lovecraftian deity of chaos (Nyarlathotep) who can take on the shape of a seemingly cute silver-haired girl. Mahiro Yasaka is a normal high school boy who is being chased by a fearsome black alien one night, until Nyaruko saves him. She explains that the creatures from H. P. Lovecraft's works are actually races of aliens, and that she has been sent to Earth by the Space Defense Agency to protect him from being kidnapped by an alien trafficker. Aliens find Mahiro and the Earth strangely attractive, for entertainment, auction, or resources. One by one, the Great Old Ones land on Earth illegally. Eventually, Nyaruko and two other Lovecraftian creatures, Cthugha and Hastur, end up being freeloaders at Mahiro's place.

== Publication ==
Haiyore! Nyaruko-san began as a light novel series written by Manta Aisora with illustrations by Koin. The series, spanning twelve volumes, was published by Soft Bank Creative under their GA Bunko imprint between April 15, 2009, and March 17, 2014. Short stories have been published in Soft Bank Creative's GA Magazine.

=== Volume list ===
| No. | Release date | ISBN |
|---|---|---|
| 1 | April 15, 2009 | 978-4-7973-5414-0 |
| 2 | July 15, 2009 | 978-4-7973-5540-6 |
| 3 | October 15, 2009 | 978-4-7973-5635-9 |
| 4 | March 16, 2010 | 978-4-7973-5801-8 |
| 5 | August 15, 2010 | 978-4-7973-6148-3 |
| 6 | December 16, 2010 | 978-4-7973-6292-3 |
| 7 | April 16, 2011 | 978-4-7973-6407-1 |
| 8 | October 17, 2011 | 978-4-7973-6644-0 |
| 9 | April 16, 2012 | 978-4-7973-6891-8 |
| 10 | October 17, 2012 | 978-4-7973-7186-4 |
| 11 | April 16, 2013 | 978-4-7973-7333-2 |
| 12 | March 17, 2014 | 978-4-7973-7424-7 |

== Media ==
=== Anime ===
An original video animation titled Haiyoru! Nyaruani (這いよる!ニャルアニ) was produced by DLE and directed by Azuma Tani. The first episode was streamed on October 23, 2009. Further episodes were published on December 19, 2010, on DVD as part of the GA Magazine Vol. 3. All 9 episodes were released on March 15, 2010, as part of the Haiyore! Nyaruko-san 4: Special Box (這いよれ!ニャル子さん4 スペシャルボックス; ISBN 978-4-7973-5782-0). The first eight episodes are about one to two minutes in length, while the final episode is about six minutes long.

Another anime series titled Haiyoru! Nyaruani: Remember My Mr. Lovecraft (這いよる!ニャルアニ リメンバー・マイ・ラブ（クラフト先生）, Hayoru! Nyaruani: Rimenbā Mai Rabu(kurafuto-sensei)), also produced by DLE and directed by Azuma Tani, aired 11 episodes on BS11 Digital between December 11, 2010, and February 26, 2011. (Note: Haiyoru! Nyaruani: Remember My Mr. Lovecraft was advertised as airing on BS11 Digital's Friday 24:30 (00:30 JST) time slot, which meant the series officially premiered on December 10, 2010.) Each episode is about four minutes in length. The twelfth episode was released as an original video animation included with the Haiyoru! Nyaruani 1&2 Perfect Box, a DVD compilation containing both Flash anime series.

An anime television series produced by Xebec aired in Japan between April 10 and June 26, 2012. (Note: Nyarko-san: Another Crawling Chaos was advertised as airing on TV Tokyo's Monday 26:00 (02:00 JST) time slot, which meant the series officially premiered on April 9, 2010.) Crunchyroll streamed the series with English subtitles outside Asia, along with the two Flash series, under the name Nyarko-san: Another Crawling Chaos. A DVD containing a short original video animation based on the short story "Easy Way to Kill Enemies" (やさしい敵の仕留め方, Yasashii Teki no Shitome-kata) was offered to those who purchased all the BD/DVD volumes of the first season. NIS America licensed the series in North America and released on subtitled Blu-ray Disc on April 15, 2014.

A second season called Haiyore! Nyaruko-san W (這いよれ！ニャル子さんW) aired in Japan between April 8 and July 1, 2013, (Note: Nyarko-san: Another Crawling Chaos W was advertised as airing on TV Tokyo's Sunday 25:05 (01:05 JST) time slot, which meant the series officially premiered on April 7, 2013.) and was also simulcast by Crunchyroll. An OVA episode on DVD was released for buying all of the second season's Blu-ray Disc or DVD volumes.

An OVA Haiyore! Nyaruko-san F (這いよれ！ニャル子さんF) was released on June 19, 2015.

=== Music ===
Opening themes

- "Taiyō Iwaku Moeyo Chaos" (太陽曰く燃えよカオス; The Sun Says "Burn, Chaos") by Ushiro kara Haiyori-tai G (Nyaruko (Kana Asumi), Kūko (Miyu Matsuki) and Tamao Kurei (Yuka Ōtsubo)) (Season 1)
- "1, 2, 3, As Mumias." (恋は渾沌の隷也, 1, 2, 3, As Mumias; Love is a Servant of Chaos) by Ushiro kara Haiyori-tai G (Season 2)
- "Haiyore Once Nyagain" (這いよれOnce Nyagain) by Ushiro kara Haiyori-tai G (F OVA)

Ending themes

- "Suki, Suki, Daisuki." (好き、好き、大好き。; Like, Like, Love.) by Nyaruko (Kana Asumi) (Haiyoru! Nyaruani)
- "Koisuru Otome no Catharsis" (恋する乙女のカタルシス; Loving Maiden's Catharsis) by Lisp (Nyaruko (Kana Asumi), Yoriko Yasaka (Azusa Kataoka) and Shantak-kun (Sayuri Hara)) (Haiyoru! Nyaruani: Remember My Mr. Lovecraft)
- "Zutto Be With You" (ずっと Be with you; Always Be with you) by RAMM ni Haiyoru Nyaruko-san (Nyaruko (Kana Asumi)) (Season 1, eps 1-11)
- "Magamagashiku mo Seinaru kana" (禍々しくも聖なるかな; The Evil and Young are Holy too) by Ushiro kara Haiyori-tai (Nyaruko (Kana Asumi), Kūko (Miyu Matsuki) and Tamao Kurei (Yuka Ōtsubo)) (Season 1, ep 12)
- "Yotte S.O.S." (よってS.O.S) by RAMM ni Haiyoru Nyaruko-san (Season 2, eps 1–2, 6, 11)
- "Wonder Nanda? Kataomoi" (Wonderナンダ？片思い; What's a Wonder? One-sided Love) by RAMM ni Haiyoru Jashin-san (Nyaruko (Kana Asumi), Kūko (Miyu Matsuki) and Hasuta (Rie Kugimiya)) (Season 2, eps 3, 8)
- "Kirai na Wake Lychee" (嫌いなワケLychee; I Hate Lychee) by RAMM ni Haiyoru Tamao-san (Tamao Kurei (Yuka Ōtsubo)) (Season 2, eps 4, 7)
- "Sister, Friend, Lover" by RAMM ni Haiyoru Kūko-san to Kūne-san (Kūko (Miyu Matsuki) and Kūne (Ryōka Yuzuki)) (Season 2, eps 5, 9)
- "Ai Crusader's†Striver" (愛クルセイダース†ストライバー, Ai Kuruseidāsu Sutoraibā) by RAMM ni Haiyoru Mahiro-san to Yoichi-san (Mahiro Yasaka (Eri Kitamura) and Takehiko Yoichi (Wataru Hatano)) (Season 2, ep 10)
- "Kimi no Tonari de" (キミのとなりで; Right Next to You) by RAMM ni Haiyoru Nyaruko-san (Nyaruko (Kana Asumi)) (Season 2, ep 12)
- "Kitto Engage" (きっとエンゲージ; Surely Engage) by RAMM ni Haiyoru Nyaruko-san (F OVA)

=== Manga ===
A manga adaptation titled Haiyore! Nyaruko-san illustrated by Kei Okazaki was serialized in Shueisha's Miracle Jump magazine from May 6, 2011, to April 10, 2013, and was compiled in two volumes. A four-panel comic strip manga titled Haiyore! Super Nyaruko-chan Time (這いよれ！スーパーニャル子ちゃんタイム) illustrated by Sōichirō Hoshino was serialized in Flex Comix's Flex Comix Blood from October 5, 2011, to November 12, 2014, and was compiled in five volumes. An anthology volume was published by Holp Shuppan on November 11, 2012.

=== Video game ===
In December 2012 5pb. announced the development of a visual novel, titled Haiyore! Nyaruko-san Meijōshigatai Game no Yōna Mono (這いよれ! ニャル子さん 名状しがたいゲームのようなもの) in which the player assumes the role of Mahiro Yasaka. The game's story is based on the first season of the anime television series, with some additional content. The game was released on PlayStation Vita on May 30, 2013, in both regular and limited editions.

== Reception ==
The series has received mixed reviews. Aiden Foote from THEM Anime Reviews gave the first season (Nyarko-san: Another Crawling Chaos) a 3 out of 5 stars rating. In his review, Foote says that the anime "should have been a whole better [sic] and could well have been" citing the over-pandering as an issue. He went on to say that a character as well-liked as Nyaruko deserved more when it came to a love interest.

== See also ==
- Call of Cthulhu, the major source of gags; characters from the R'lyeh Antique books also appear in this series
- Bofuri, another light novel series illustrated by Koin
