= Amber Lee Connors =

American voice actress (born 1991)

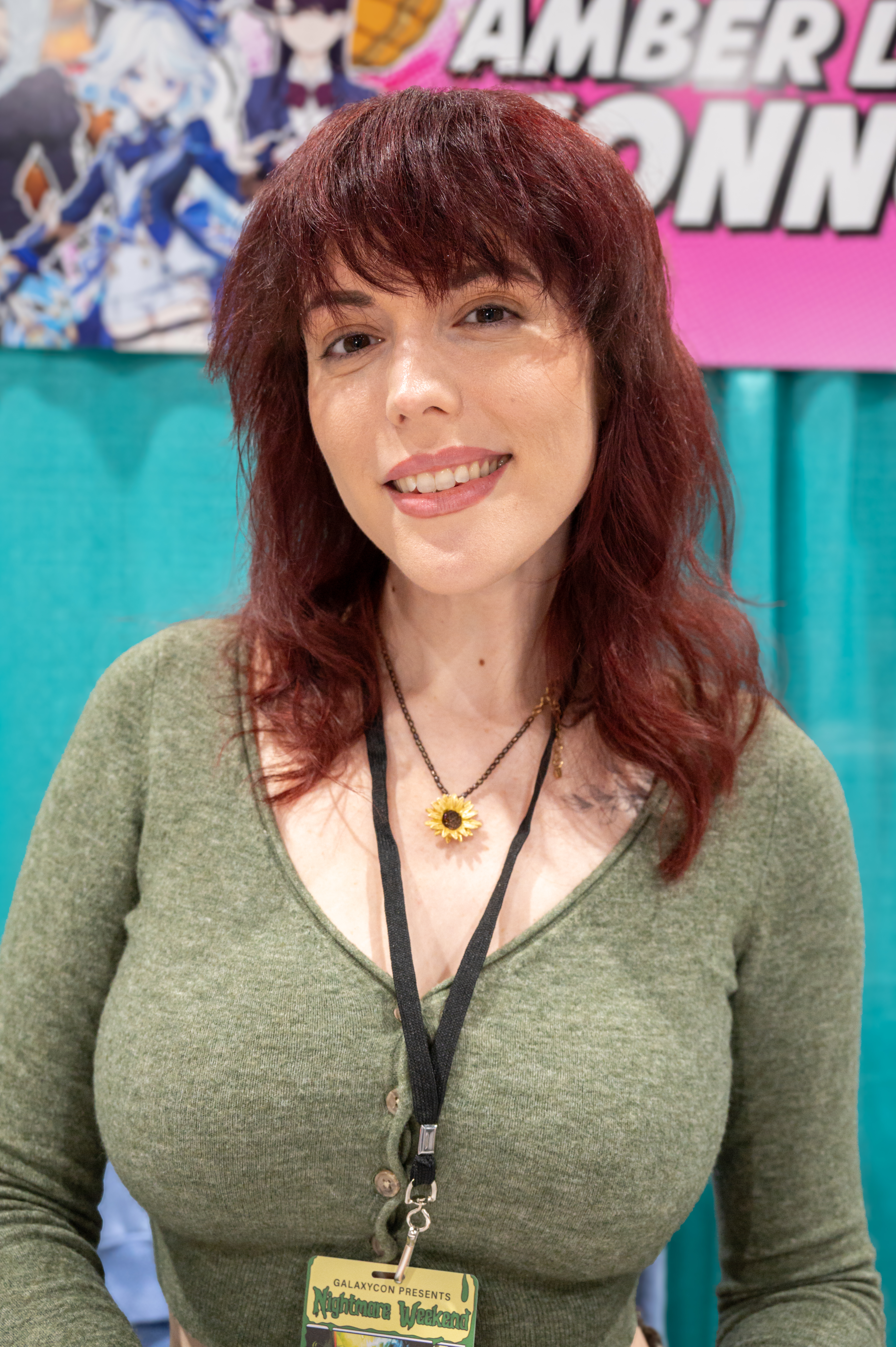
- Connors in 2025
- Born: April 9, 1991 (age 35)
- Education: Cuyahoga Community College; Baldwin Wallace University
- Occupation: Voice actress
- Years active: 2010–present
- Employer: Sound Cadence Studios
- Spouse: Samuel Drake (2026)
- Partner: Howard Wang (2018–2023)
- Website: www.amberleeconnors.com

Amber Lee Connors (born April 9, 1991) is an American voice actress, dubbing director, and line producer who has provided voices for English dubbed Japanese anime and video games. She is known for her roles as Nozomi Kaminashi from Keijo!!!!!!!!, Miki Kawai from A Silent Voice, Takami Karibuchi from Brave Witches, Akane Hiyama from Love Tyrant, Juri Yukawa from Kokkoku: Moment by Moment, Esther Rosenthal from A Certain Scientific Accelerator, Komi Shoko from Komi Can't Communicate, Yuri Shiraki from Lord of Vermilion: The Crimson King, Mai Kawakami from Myriad Colors Phantom World, Ooi from Kancolle, Ayano Hanasaki from Hanebado!, Pieck from Attack on Titan, Lucinia Porter from Meta Runner, Megakaryocyte from Cells at Work!, Mei Aihara from Citrus, and Crimson Roselia and Shirley Orlando in The Legend of Heroes, Trails of Cold Steel series. Connors is also the founder of post-production company Sound Cadence Studios.

== Filmography ==
=== Anime ===
List of dubbing performances in anime
Year	Title	Role	Notes	Source
2015	Holy Knight	Lilith Kishimoto		
2015	Ladies versus Butlers!	Tomomi Saikyo		
2016	Assassination Classroom	Young Gamer Boy	Season 2, Eps. 9–10	Website
2016	Divine Gate	Macbeth	Ep. 9	Website
2016	Three Leaves, Three Colors	Viracocha (Cat)	Ep. 8	Website
2016	Cheer Boys!!	Chihiro Sakai		Website
2016	Juden Chan	Pulse Trans		
2016–17	Keijo!!!!!!!!	Nozomi Kaminashi	First lead role	
2016–17	Alderamin on the Sky	Kanna Temari	Eps. 6–8	Website
2017	KanColle	Ōi		
2017	Aria the Scarlet Ammo AA	Shino Sasaki		Website
2017	Love Tyrant	Akane Hiyama		Website
2017	WorldEnd	Chtholly Nota Seniorious		Website
2017	Rio: Rainbow Gate!	Rio Rollins	ADR Director, ADR Writer, ADR Engineer, casting director	
2017–18	The Silver Guardian	Rei Riku		Website
2017	Brave Witches	Takami Karibuchi		Website
2017	Tsugumomo	Taguri Kanayama	Ep. 7	Website
2017	Kantai Collection	Ooi (Oicchi)		Website
2017	Regalia: The Three Sacred Stars	Yuinshiel Asteria		Website
2017	Hina Logi ~from Luck & Logic~	Mizuki Azuma		Website
2017	In Another World With My Smartphone	Olga Strand		Website
2017	New Game!!	Okada	Season 2, Ep. 3	Website
2017	Restaurant to Another World	Arte	Ep. 8	Website
2017	Convenience Store Boy Friends	Waka Kisaki	Ep. 7	Website
2017	One Piece	Seira		Website
2017	King's Game The Animation	Aya Kuramoto		Website
2017	A Sister's All You Need	Ashley Ono		Website
2017	Blood Blockade Battlefront & Beyond	Janet Barlow	Ep. 4	Website
2017	Myriad Colors Phantom World	Mai Kawakami		Website
2017	Hundred	Sakura Kirishima		Website
2018	Junji Ito Collection	Sayuri Tsuji	Ep. 1	Website
2018	Katana Maidens ~ Toji No Miko	Princess Takiri		Website
2018	Citrus	Mei Aihara		Website
2018	Hakata Tonkotsu Ramens	Misaki		Website
2018	Basilisk: The Ouka Ninja Scrolls	Yasha Itaru!	Eps. 4–8	Website
2018	My Hero Academia	Ms. Joke		Website
2018	Legend of the Galactic Heroes: Die Neue These	Annerose von Grünewald		Website
2018	High School DxD Hero	Jeanne		Website
2018	Harukana Receive	Claire Thomas		Website
2018	Hanebado!	Ayano Hanesaki		Website
2018	Lord of Vermilion: The Crimson King	Yuri Shiraki		Website
2018	SSSS.Gridman	Hass		Website
2018	Ulysses: Jeanne d'Arc and the Alchemist Knight	Charlotte		Website
2018	Bloom Into You	Akari Hyuga		
2018	Conception	Yuzuha		Website
2018–19	Fairy Tail	Brandish μ		Website
2019	Dragon Ball Super	Dercori		
2019	Endro!	Princess Rona		Website
2019	Kokkoku: Moment by Moment	Juri Yukawa		Website
2019	Azur Lane	Akagi		
2019	Fruits Basket	Rika Aida		
2019	Kono Oto Tomare! Sounds of Life	Satowa Houzuki		Website
2019	Cutie Honey Universe	Junpei, Cutter Claw		Website
2019	7 Seeds	Hana Sugurono		Website
2019	Miss Caretaker of Sunohara-sou	Sumire Yamanashi		Website
2019	Why the Hell are You Here, Teacher!?	Chizuru Tachibana		Website
2019	Kemono Friends	Brown Bear		Website
2019	A Certain Scientific Accelerator	Esther Rosenthal		Website
2020	To Love Ru	Yui Kotegawa		
2020	Infinite Dendrogram	Marie Adler		
2020	Super HxEros	Yuuna		
2020	Wandering Witch: The Journey of Elaina	Elaina		
2021	Attack on Titan: The Final Season	Pieck		
2021	Sakura Wars the Animation	Hatsuho Shinonome		
2021	Sleepy Princess in the Demon Castle	Teddy Demon	ADR Director	
2021	Re:Zero − Starting Life in Another World 2nd Season	Fortuna		
2021	Kuma Kuma Kuma Bear	Atla		
2021	The Hidden Dungeon Only I Can Enter	Sarah Longhram, Lenore Bludon		
2021	Back Arrow	Tom		
2021	Combatants Will Be Dispatched!	Snow		
2021	Pretty Boy Detective Club	Rei		
2021	Dragon Goes House-Hunting		Line Producer	
2021	How Not to Summon a Demon Lord Ω	Lumachina Weselia		
2021	Higurashi: When They Cry – Gou	Nomura		
2021	I've Been Killing Slimes for 300 Years and Maxed Out My Level	Flatorte		
2021	The Seven Deadly Sins: Dragon's Judgement	Gelda		Netflix dub
2021	Yashahime: Princess Half-Demon	Sea Snake Woman		
2021–present	Jujutsu Kaisen	Mei Mei, Nagi Yoshino		
2021–22	JoJo's Bizarre Adventure: Stone Ocean	Gwess, Prisoner		Netflix dub
2022	Blue Period	Shirai		Netflix dub
2022	Tribe Nine	Yui Kamiki		
2022	Girls' Frontline	M4A1		
2022	Komi Can't Communicate	Shoko Komi		Netflix dub
2022	The Genius Prince's Guide to Raising a Nation Out of Debt	Falanya Elk Arbalest		
2022	Tokyo 24th Ward	Sakiko Tsuzuragawa		
2022	The Rising of the Shield Hero	Ost Horai		
2022	Boruto: Naruto Next Generations	Delta		
2022	Kakegurui Twin	Sachiko Juraku		Netflix dub
2022	Bleach: Thousand-Year Blood War	Shino Madarame		
2023	Undead Unluck	Gina		
2024	Mission: Yozakura Family	Rin Fudō		Hulu dub
2024	Beyblade X	Yuni Naniwa		

=== Films ===
List of dubbing performances in films
Year	Title	Role	Notes	Source
2017	One Piece Film: Gold	Baccarat		
2017	A Silent Voice	Miki Kawai		Website
2017	Fairy Tail: Dragon Cry	Brandish μ		
2018	Hells	Rei Kagurazaka		
2021	The Island of Giant Insects	Misuzu Jinno		
2024	Sailor Moon Cosmos	Sailor Chi		

=== Animation ===
List of voice performances in animation
Year	Title	Role	Notes	Source
2010–2018	Hellsing Ultimate Abridged	Junior Warrant Officer Schrödinger	Miniseries	
2013–2018	Dragon Ball Z Abridged	Android 18, Mrs. Briefs	Season 3	
2017–18	RWBY	Vernal	Volume 5	
2019–22	Meta Runner	Lucinia Porter		
2020	Pokémon: Twilight Wings	Amoonguss, Krookodile, Honey		
2021	Pokémon Evolutions	Diantha	Episode 3	

=== Video games ===
List of voice performances in video games
Year	Title	Role	Notes	Source
2010	Heroes of Newerth	Death Metal Rhapsody, Circe the Deceiver, Yi Peng, Countessa Raze		Website
2011	King Cashing	Female Archer Hero		Website
2012	Princess Battles	Aurelia		Website
2012	Dust: An Elysian Tail	Ginger		
2012	Malevolence: The Sword of Ahkranox	Various characters		Website
2013	King Cashing 2	Melee, Tamer, Cyborgette		Website
2013	The Elder Scrolls V: Skyrim	Viconia Devir	Original mod	Website
2014	Detective Grimoire	Sally Spears		Website
2014	Smite	Scarlet Dangerfield, Skadi Pixel Lancer, Revenge Tech Nemesis, Valkyrie's Rage Thanatos		Website
2014	DreadOut	Ira, Kuntilanak, Suzi	Also Act II DLC	Website
2014	Dead Island: Epidemic	Amber, Hailey		Website
2014	HuniePop	Beli Lapran		Website
2016	FNaF World	Toy Chica, Nightmare Chica, JJ	Update 2	Website
2016	Payday 2	Female Bank Employee	Wolf Pack DLC	Website
2016	HunieCam Studio	Beli, Candy, Sarah		Website
2016	Battlerite	Jade		Website
2016	Five Nights at Freddy's: Sister Location	Clara		
2017	Marvel Avengers Academy	Medusa		Website
2017	Regalia: Of Men and Monarchs	Gwendolyn, Additional voices		
2017	Battle Chef Brigade	Thorn, Hazgil, Shiv		Press
2017	The Letter	Hannah Wright		Website
2018	Paladins	Aurora Furia, Battlesuit Eagle Eye Kinessa		Website
2018	Ultimate Custom Night	Toy Chica		Website
2018	Atlas	Human Female Character		Website
2019	Borderlands 3	Female Psycho, Female Wildcard, Carolina, Sandy Hart		Website
2019	Five Nights at Freddy's: Help Wanted	Female Computer Voice		Website
2019	Five Nights at Freddy's: Special Delivery	Toy Chica		
2019	Gibbous - A Cthulhu Adventure	Margot		Website
2019	Tangle Tower	Sally		
2019	ReadySet Heroes	Sloane, Announcer		
2019	The Legend of Heroes: Trails of Cold Steel III	Shirley Orlando, Roselia		
2019	MapleStory	Farasi, Seren		Twitter
2020	ARK: Survival Evolved	Helena Walker/HLNA		Facebook
2020	Exogenesis: Perils of Rebirth	Hayami Koto		Website
2020	The Legend of Heroes: Trails of Cold Steel IV	Crimson Roselia, Shirley Orlando		
2021	Guilty Gear Strive	I-No		
2021	Cookie Run: Kingdom	Rye Cookie		
2021	Fire Emblem Heroes	Vika		
2021	Legends of Runeterra	Ada		
2021	Mary Skelter Finale	Guillotine		
2021	Phantasy Star Online 2: New Genesis	Aina		PSO2 Website
2022	Relayer	Mintaka, additional voices		
2022	Tower of Fantasy	Tsubasa		
2022	Goddess of Victory: Nikke	Mary, Maxwell, K		
2022	River City Girls 2	Paradolia		
2023	Path of the Midnight Sun	Faratras Hoikade		
2023	Trinity Trigger	Violet		
2023	Master Detective Archives: Rain Code	Halara Nightmare		
2023	Genshin Impact	Furina, Focalors		
2023	The Legend of Heroes: Trails into Reverie	Roselia Millstein, Mimi		
2023	Rune Factory 3 Special	Sakuya		
2023	Rhapsody II: Ballad of the Little Princess	Marjoly		
2023	Rhapsody III: Memories of Marl Kingdom	Marjoly		
2023	Disgaea 7: Vows of the Virtueless	Cannon Line		
2024	Persona 3 Reload	Additional voices		
2024	Unicorn Overlord	Hilda		
2024	Romancing SaGa 2: Revenge of the Seven	Andromache/Mercenary (F)		
2024	Ys X: Nordics	Millette, Guila		
2024	Be My Horde	Moriana		
2025	Fatal Fury: City of the Wolves	B. Jenet		
2025	Raidou Remastered: The Mystery of the Soulless Army	Rin		
2025	Story of Seasons: Grand Bazaar	Nadine, additional voices		
2025	Everybody's Golf Hot Shots	Aile		
2025	Towa and the Guardians of the Sacred Tree	Fuumi/Mifu, Iyasaka (young child), Juro, Saku		
2025	Digimon Story: Time Stranger	Kanan Yuki		
2026	Honkai: Star Rail	Nihilux		
2026	Zenless Zone Zero	Remielle Dan		
2026	Neverness to Everness	Fadia		
2026	Professor Layton and the New World of Steam	Elinora Allinston, Elida Allinston		
2027	Persona 4 Revival	Naoto Shirogane		

== Sound Cadence Studios ==
In 2013, Connors founded Sound Cadence Studios LLC, an American dubbing and post-production studio that specializes in anime dubs for Discotek Media and Crunchyroll (formerly Funimation). The studio is headquartered in Addison, Texas and on June 19, 2022, Sound Cadence opened a new studio based in Los Angeles.

=== Works ===
==== Anime ====
- Actors: Songs Connection (Crunchyroll)
- A Couple of Cuckoos (Crunchyroll)
- Bananya and the Curious Bunch (Crunchyroll/Discotek Media)
- Kemono Friends (Discotek Media)
- Tribe Nine (Crunchyroll)
- Digimon Adventure (film) (Discotek Media)
- Digimon Adventure: Our War Game! (Discotek Media)
- Digimon Adventure 02: Hurricane Touchdown!!/Transcendent Evolution!! The Golden Digimentals (Discotek Media)
- Love Com (Discotek Media)

=== Video games ===
- Tower of Fantasy (Level Infinite)
- Zenless Zone Zero (Hoyoverse)
- Guilty Gear Strive (Arc System Works)
