= Memories (1995 film) =

1995 Japanese animated science fiction anthology film

- Theatrical release poster
- Directed by: Kōji Morimoto (Magnetic Rose); Tensai Okamura (Stink Bomb); Katsuhiro Otomo (Chief, Cannon Fodder)
- Screenplay by: Satoshi Kon (Magnetic Rose); Katsuhiro Otomo (Stink Bomb, Cannon Fodder)
- Story by: Katsuhiro Otomo
- Based on: Magnetic Rose, Stink Bomb and Cannon Fodder by Katsuhiro Otomo
- Produced by: Atsushi Sugita; Fumio Sameshima; Yoshimasa Mizuo; Hiroaki Inoue; Eiko Tanaka (Magnetic Rose, Cannon Fodder); Masao Maruyama (Stink Bomb)
- Edited by: Takeshi Seyama
- Music by: Takkyū Ishino (opening and closing credits); Yoko Kanno (Magnetic Rose); Jun Miyake (Stink Bomb); Hiroyuki Nagashima (Cannon Fodder)
- Production companies: Studio 4°C (Magnetic Rose, Cannon Fodder); Madhouse (Stink Bomb)
- Distributed by: Shochiku
- Release date: December 23, 1995
- Running time: 113 min
- Country: Japan
- Language: Japanese

Memories is a 1995 Japanese animated science fiction anthology film with Katsuhiro Otomo as executive producer, and based on three of his manga short stories. The film is composed of three shorts: Magnetic Rose (Japanese: 彼女の想いで, Hepburn: Kanojo no Omoide), directed by Studio 4°C co-founder Kōji Morimoto and written by Satoshi Kon; Stink Bomb (最臭兵器, Saishū-heiki), directed by Tensai Okamura and written by Otomo, and Cannon Fodder (大砲の街, Taihō no Machi), written and directed by Otomo himself.

Originally released on home video in North America by Sony Pictures Home Entertainment, Discotek Media acquired the rights in 2020 along with Mill Creek Entertainment. Their 2021 Blu-ray release includes English subtitles and a new English dub produced by NYAV Post (for Magnetic Rose) and Sound Cadence Studios (for Stink Bomb and Cannon Fodder).

== Plot ==
=== Magnetic Rose ===
The Corona, a deep space salvage freighter, is out on a mission when it encounters a distress signal and responds to it. They come upon a spaceship graveyard orbiting a giant space station. The crew's two engineers, Heintz and Miguel, enter it to get a closer look. Once inside, they discover an opulent European interior and several furnished rooms in varying states of decay, but find no signs of life.

The men learn that the station belongs to a once-famous opera diva named Eva Friedel who disappeared after the murder of her fiancé, Carlo Rambaldi, a fellow singer. Continuing to search for the distress signal's source, the engineers split up, with each experiencing paranormal encounters, including strange noises and visions of Eva. Miguel enters the dilapidated underbelly of the station, and in a cavernous chamber, he finds a broken piano playing the distress signal. He begins to hallucinate and Eva suddenly runs up to kiss him. Heintz finds a theater stage and sees Eva, who stabs him when he approaches. Suddenly paralyzed, Heintz relives a memory of his wife and his daughter Emily. The illusion disappears when Eva takes his wife's form and tells him that he "will never leave".

Heintz rushes to save Miguel, but Miguel disappears deeper into the cavern, having been seduced by Eva into thinking he is Carlo. Eva reveals to Heintz that she murdered the real Carlo for refusing to marry her and has since forced others to relive his likeness. She makes Heintz relive Emily's death, and entices Heintz to stay with his daughter's doppelganger. Heintz resists and shoots the massive computer embedded in the ceiling of the cavern, causing the AI hologram of Eva to malfunction.

Meanwhile, the Corona has been struggling against a powerful magnetic field coming from the station, pulling the ship towards it. In desperation, the crewmen Aoshima and Ivanov fire a powerful energy cannon; gouging deep enough into the structure to reach the cavern and Heintz, moments before the ship is torn apart. Heintz is ejected into space along with the space-suit-clad skeletons of Eva's past victims, as Eva hauntingly sings to a conjured audience. The Corona is destroyed and becomes part of the rose-shaped structure around the station. The whereabouts of the real (and long-deceased) Eva are shown, and a representation of Eva is seen talking romantically with Miguel (now fully embracing his new identity as Carlo). Heintz is last seen drifting in space, still alive.

=== Stink Bomb ===
Lab technician Nobuo Tanaka, battling the flu, mistakes some experimental pills for medicine and swallows one. The pills were intended to help soldiers counter biological weapons, but it reacts to a flu shot that he had received before the medicine, causing his body to produce vast amounts of a highly toxic gas. While taking a nap, the odor he emits kills everyone in the laboratory. Horrified, he reports the incident to headquarters, who instruct him to deliver the experimental drug to Tokyo. Nobuo has become a living weapon of mass destruction.

Meanwhile, the odor he emits grows stronger to where it affects several miles of the surrounding area, killing every animal that breathes in the gas, though plants survive exposure to the unknown chemical agent and appear to be strengthened by it. The toxic gas is so potent that neither gas masks nor NBC suits offer any protection against its effects. As Nobuo travels through Yamanashi Prefecture, the deadly odor kills all animal life in its path, including all 200,000 residents of the city of Kōfu. Nobuo continues his journey towards Tokyo, unaware of the deaths he is causing, but the rest of the country is in a complete panic. The head of the research company and the Japanese military deduce that Tanaka is causing the poisonous gas and order him to be killed. The Japan Self Defense Forces try in vain to stop Nobuo with the use of artillery and missiles, but the chemicals interfere with the targeting systems of their weapons.

The U.S. military, who have been observing the situation to that point, invokes the U.S.-Japan Security Treaty to take over the operation to recover Nobuo, and calls in a NASA unit with space suits to try and capture Nobuo alive. After Nobuo enters a tunnel, the Japanese army collapses part of the bridge and the tunnel behind him, trapping him with only one way out. They turn on wind generators in an attempt to stop the odor's advance. As the soldiers in space suits approach Nobuo, he becomes scared and more of his odor bursts out of him, disabling the lights and wind generators.

After the cloud settles, the soldiers appear to have subdued Nobuo. One of the suit-wearing soldiers is escorted to the military headquarters in Tokyo and delivers the drug. The soldier opens their visor, revealing that it is actually Nobuo, who was placed inside the suit by one of the other soldiers, but is still unaware of his condition. He then fully opens his suit, killing everyone in the room.

=== Cannon Fodder ===
In a walled city perpetually at war, everyone's livelihood depends upon maintaining and firing the enormous cannons that make up most of the city. Nearly every building in the city is equipped with cannons of varying size, able to fire huge artillery shells over the city walls. The story is animated into one long take, conveying the daily life of a young schoolboy; his father, who works as a lowly cannon-loader; and his mother, a munitions factory worker.

The city is surrounded by a crater-filled wasteland that is covered in clouds of smoke and dust produced by the cannon fire. Despite propaganda emphasizing the threat of the enemy, there is no visual confirmation that this is true, or even if there is an enemy at all. The boy's father is assigned to one of the city's largest cannons: an enormous red railway gun that is personally fired by a lavishly dressed officer. The father is blamed for a safety mishap, and made to stand next to the cannon without safety gear while it is fired again.

That night, the family is at home and hears a news report proclaiming the devastation unleashed on the enemy city. The boy then asks his father why they are fighting in the first place, only for his father to tell him that he will understand when he is older. As the boy gets into his bed, he imagines himself as the officer in charge of firing the railway gun. As he sleeps, a civil defense siren sounds and a blue light sweeps across the window.

== Cast ==
Cast
Character	Japanese	English
Magnetic Rose
Heintz Beckner	Tsutomu Isobe	Marc Swint
Ivanov	Shouzou Iizuka	Frank Todaro
Miguel Costrela	Kouichi Yamadera	Robbie Daymond
Aoshima	Shigeru Chiba	Derek Stephen Prince
Emily	Ami Hasegawa	Alexa Careccia
Eva Friedel	Gara Takashima	Laura Post
Stink Bomb
Nobuo Tanaka	Hideyuki Hori	Stephen Fu
Oomaeda	Ken'ichi Ogata	Chris Guerrero
Kamata	Osamu Saka	Gianni Matragrano
Grandma	Hisako Kyouda	Karen Kahler
Nirasaki	Michio Hazama	Steven Kelly
Sakiko	Kayoko Fujii	Kira Buckland
General Officer	Chikao Ōtsuka	Mike Pollock
Cannon Fodder
Boy	Yuu Hayashi	Jack Britton
Father	Keaton Yamada	Mike Pollock
Mother	Keiko Yamamoto	Ellen-Ray Hennessey (as Elley Ray)
Teacher	Ryuuji Nakagi	Michael Sorich
Loading Operator	Nobuaki Fukuda	Phillip Sacramento
Commander	Hidetoshi Nakamura	Ray Hurd

== Production ==
=== Magnetic Rose ===
Directed by Kōji Morimoto and animated by Studio 4°C. Screenplay by Satoshi Kon, based on a story by Katsuhiro Otomo. Music in this episode was composed by Yoko Kanno and largely based upon Giacomo Puccini's Madama Butterfly and Tosca. Kon also provided animation layout for this segment.

Arias from Un bel dì, vedremo, Con onor muore and Tu, tu piccolo Iddio were specifically sampled from Madama Butterfly, while Non la sospiri, la nostra casetta was sampled from Act I of Tosca.

=== Stink Bomb ===
Directed by Tensai Okamura and animated by Madhouse. Script by Katsuhiro Otomo. Music is by Jun Miyake and uses jazz and ska as its main influence, buttressing the film's chaotic, comedic nature.

It is mentioned in the interview featurette that the story for Stink Bomb is based on an actual event.

Otomo initially asked Yoshiaki Kawajiri to direct the film, but Kawajiri did not accept because the script was different from his own style. Kawajiri was involved in storyboard revisions as a supervisor, and also worked on the tunnel scene as a key animator.

=== Cannon Fodder ===
Written and directed by Katsuhiro Otomo and animated by Studio 4°C. Music by Hiroyuki Nagashima. The score of Cannon Fodder is difficult to categorize; blending brass band, orchestral and avant-garde compositional techniques.

The film consists of one continuous shot. Animation film director Sunao Katabuchi was specially invited to devise the techniques used to produce this illusion.

== Reception ==
The film was met with positive reviews, although reception for each of the three stories varied. In 2001, Animage magazine ranked Memories 68th in their list of the 100 greatest anime productions.

Magnetic Rose has generally been deemed the best episode, with critics at Anime Meta-Review and T.H.E.M Anime saying it alone made the film worth watching. Anime Academy thought it was "a pure symphonic treat from start to finish" and "running only forty-five minutes, it can still be compared with the greatest anime productions in every single aspect from animation to storyline." John Wallis of DVD Talk called it "a great opener, a strong, moving story of love, loss, haunting heartbreak, and horror chills." Magnetic Rose was also regarded as "a science fiction marvel" by Homemademech's Mark McPherson, who praised its dialogue and realistic presentation of outer space physics. Chris Beveridge from Mania.com, however, felt that the story had "some feel of being done before to some degree."

Comments on Stink Bomb and Cannon Fodder were less favorable. T.H.E.M. Anime reviewer Carlos Ross opined that "the other two entries don't quite equal the sheer excellence of Magnetic Rose". McPherson referred to Stink Bomb by saying "compared to the other episodes of Memories, it's the weakest and less creative of the bunch", while Anime Jump's Chad Clayton thought Cannon Fodder did not "match the complexity of the preceding two films." Stink Bomb was nonetheless praised for its humor and high quality visuals. Cannon Fodder was viewed as "the strongest work in terms of its allegorical message" by DVD Talk, and visually "inventive" by both Anime Jump and Anime Academy. Tasha Robinson at SciFi.com described the animation of every episode as "stellar", claiming the film as a whole went "well beyond memorable".

== See also ==
- List of animated feature films
- List of package films
- Neo Tokyo – An Otomo anthology film from 1987.
- Robot Carnival – An Otomo anthology film from 1987.
- Short Peace – An Otomo anthology film from 2013.
