= Karen Kahler =

American actress and voice actress

Karen Kahler is an American actress and voice actress.

== Filmography ==
=== Live-Action roles ===
- 113 Degrees - Annora
- Bound for Destiny
- Face
- In This House
- Murder in the West - Mary Paulson
- Necrosis
- Our Own
- Party Like the Rich and Famous - Party Guest
- SamHas7Friends - Fran
- Stem - Nurse
- The Isolationist - The Maid
- The Hollywood Set -
- The Magician - The Sister
- True Tales of Terror
- Winky - Beverly

=== Video game roles ===
- Anna's Quest: Volume 1 - Winfriede's Tower - Narrator
- Dust: An Elysian Tail - Oneida/FloHop
- EVE: DUST 514
- Forest Keeper
- Gothic Fiction: Dark Saga
- Heroes of Newerth - Phoenix Ra/Clockwork Archer
- Icebound - Bartender
- Jaws: Ultimate Predator
- Legion of the Damned
- Lemonade Standoff
- Life Is Strange 2 - Joan Marcus
- Little Zoologist
- Loren The Amazon Princess - Karen
- Lost in Random - The Queen/Aleksandra
- Malevolence: The Sword of Ahkranox - Female Hero/Elder God
- Miner Wars 2081 - Various
- Octopath Traveler - Various
- Project D
- Retro Act: Rearmed
- Rite of Passage: The Perfect Show
- Shadow Wolf Mysteries 2: Bane of the Family
- Spirits of Mystery: The Dark Minotaur
- Wing Commander Saga - Jessica Wagner/Various Characters
- Witches' Legacy: The Charleston Curse
- Battlerite - Iva
