= Yuki Nagano =

Japanese voice actress and singer

- 長野 佑紀
- Born: 27 June 1997 (age 29)
- Occupations: Voice actress; singer
- Years active: 2017–present
- Employer: Early Wing
- Notable work: Love Tyrant as Yuzu Kichōgasaki; The Idolmaster Cinderella Girls as Reina Koseki; The Hidden Dungeon Only I Can Enter as Alice Stardia

Yuki Nagano (Japanese: 長野 佑紀, Hepburn: Nagano Yuki; born 27 June 1997) is a Japanese voice actress and singer from Hiroshima Prefecture, affiliated with Early Wing. She is known for portraying Yuzu Kichōgasaki in Love Tyrant, Reina Koseki in The Idolmaster Cinderella Girls, and Alice Stardia in The Hidden Dungeon Only I Can Enter.

== Biography ==
Yuki Nagano, a native of Hiroshima Prefecture, was born on 27 June 1997. A fan of anime since childhood, her initial dream was to be a manga artist. However, after watching the anime adaptation of Shugo Chara!, she decided that she "wanted to be the character" and therefore decided to go into voice acting. She was educated at the Tokyo Animator Gakuin Voice Actor and Talent Department.

In 2017, Nagano made her voice acting debut as Yuzu Kichōgasaki in Love Tyrant. Yuzu was also the first character she had auditioned for, and she later revealed in an interview with Animate Times that she felt nervous after leaving the microphone during her audition. In November 2020, she was cast as Alice Stardia in The Hidden Dungeon Only I Can Enter.

She voices Reina Koseki in The Idolmaster Cinderella Girls, a sub-franchise in The Idolmaster franchise. Since then, she has performed as a singer on several Idolmaster music releases, including the 2020 single "The Idolmaster Cinderella Girls Starlight Master Gold Rush! 04 Hero Versus Reinanjō" (which charted at #9 in the Oricon Singles Chart) and the 2021 single "The Idolmaster Cinderella Girls Starlight Master Gold Rush! 08 Evil Live" (which charted at #16 in the Oricon Singles Chart).

== Filmography ==
=== Animated television ===
2017

- Love Tyrant, Yuzu Kichougasaki

2018

- Death March to the Parallel World Rhapsody, girl, Ririo

2019

- After School Dice Club
- Ascendance of a Bookworm, Jenni

2020

- A Destructive God Sits Next to Me, young Mogami
- Toilet-Bound Hanako-kun

2021

- The Hidden Dungeon Only I Can Enter, Alice Stardia

2025

- Tasokare Hotel, Ruri

=== Video games ===
2017

- Gun Gun Pixies, Eli Leviant
- Hoshi no Rebellion, Henry Percy, Rofu, etc.
- Tasokare Hotel, Ruri

2018

- Fight League, Cheerful Leader Mu-tan
- Hyakka Hyōjinden Asuka, Aoi
- Phantom of the Kill, Moralta
- Sengoku Taiga, Kikyō
- Tsumugu Logic

2019

- Bullet Break, You, Lanterna
- Last Period, Portier
- Miracle Force, An

2020

- Death End Request 2, Elizabeth Parris
- Hiyoko-shachō no Machidzukuri, Kokoro
- Tenka Hyakken Zan, Shirō Atsushi
- The Idolmaster Cinderella Girls, Reina Koseki
- Yoru, Tomosu, Suzu Izayoi

2021

- Black Surgenight, Wasp

=== Original video animation ===
2018

- Iya na Kao Sarenagara Opantsu Misete Moraitai, Yuina

=== Others ===
- Onsen Musume, Hitoka Miyahama
