= Love Tyrant =

Japanese manga series by Megane Mihoshi

- First volume cover by Aplix featuring Guri posing as a shinigami

恋愛暴君 (Ren'ai Bōkun)
- Genre: Harem, romantic comedy, supernatural
- Manga
- Written by: Megane Mihoshi
- Published by: Flex Comix
- Magazine: Comic Meteor
- Original run: May 9, 2012 – December 5, 2018
- Volumes: 14
- Anime television series
- Directed by: Atsushi Nigorikawa
- Produced by: Takaya Ibira; Hirohiko Kanbe; Hiroyuki Tanaka; Migaku Sugita; Yousuke Takabayashi; Sōji Miyagi; Shunsuke Matsumura
- Written by: Natsuko Takahashi
- Music by: Monaca
- Studio: EMT Squared
- Licensed by: Crunchyroll
- Original network: TV Tokyo, AT-X, BS Japan
- Original run: April 6, 2017 – June 22, 2017
- Episodes: 12

Love Tyrant (恋愛暴君, Ren'ai Bōkun), also known as The Very Lovely Tyrant of Love, is a Japanese manga series written by Megane Mihoshi. It was serialized online from May 2012 to January 2019 in Flex Comix's Comic Meteor website. It has been collected in fourteen tankōbon volumes. The series follows a high school student named Seiji Aino, who becomes trapped in a polyamorous relationship with four girls: the annoying angel cupid Guri, the violently obsessive Akane Hiyama, the shy but defensive Yuzu Kichougasaki, and the sadistic psychopath Shikimi Shiramine. Seiji is tasked with showing Guri how to properly utilize her Kiss Note, which magically brings couples together, and teaching her all about true love. An anime adaptation was announced, and aired from April 6 to June 22, 2017.

== Plot ==
A Kiss Note is a notebook that makes anyone who has their name written together fall in love if they kiss each other regardless of any circumstances. This item belongs to an angel named Guri whose job as a cupid is to create couples. However, she accidentally writes down the name of Seiji Aino, a regular high school student, and unless he kisses someone, Guri will die. She convinces Seiji to kiss his crush, Akane Hiyama, the school's popular girl, who is revealed to have stronger feelings for him, bordering on obsessive and psychotic. Akane and Seiji come together, but Guri decides that she likes Seiji as well. What might seem desirable to some becomes a difficult situation for Seiji, who wants a normal relationship.

== Characters ==
=== Main ===
Seiji Aino (藍野 青司, Aino Seiji)
Voiced by: Kenshō Ono (Japanese); Austin Tindle (English)
Seiji encountered Guri at the front door, cosplaying as a shinigami. She told him that his name was written in the Kiss Note and if he did not kiss someone within 24 hours, she would die and he would remain a virgin for life. He eventually reveals his crush for Akane, only to find out her yandere tendencies. Seiji is a more-or-less levelheaded individual, trying to please all the women around him without hurting them. He, like all the others except for Guri, are minor angels as Guri made them all into a relationship together including Akane's half-sister, Yuzu. meanwhile, Seiji was asked by Guri's father, God to help her search for the meaning of love which he reluctantly agrees due to the conditions on the Kiss Note. As a result, they are all effectively immortal but they will still feel pain and if Guri fails to do her job, the people connected to her will cease to exist altogether. As they spend their daily lives being together, he realized that he already develops feelings towards Akane, Yuzu even Guri herself that linked together as couples in the Kiss Note. After learning some advice from the people he knows throughout his daily life, he managed to confess his true feelings towards Akane, Yuzu and Guri respectively. In the end of the manga, he married Akane, Yuzu, and Guri in the wedding ceremony with the support of their families on both sides he recruited three girls in the Aino Family.
Guri (グリ)
Voiced by: Yoshino Aoyama (Japanese); Jad Saxton (English)
An Angel/Cupid. The literal child of God and the former Lady of Hell, Mavuro. Due to this, Guri has the natural tendency to "fall" easier than most angels. She often treats her duty as a Cupid like a joke, forming almost exclusively gay couples due to her love for male romance. However also due to this she goes over her quota for couples to be formed per month. Ironically, despite being a Cupid, she does not understand the concept of Love. In fact, the reason she is a cupid because her father wanted her to try to understand what love is, as that is one requirement for becoming God (God must love everyone). Therefore, Guri's father God asking Seiji to aid her in searching the meaning of love. Despite she once became a Devil and going to Hell due to Seiji's harsh and uncertain feelings towards her, Guri starts to recognize certain emotions when she is reunited back with Seiji and finally realized that she needs Seiji's love towards her after all when being asked by Seiji about her feelings to him thus turning her back into an Angel. Touched by Seiji's confession to her one day, Guri knows that she already found the true love of her life while crying in happiness. In the end of manga, she becomes one of the Seiji's brides alongside Akane and Yuzu in the wedding ceremony, and joins the Aino family. She is now Guri Aino.
Akane Hiyama (緋山 茜, Hiyama Akane)
Voiced by: Manami Numakura (Japanese); Amber Lee Connors (English)
The Class Idol of Seiji's school. Seiji initially had a crush on her prior to the start of the series, but failed to act on such emotions out of the belief that she is out of his league. Upon discovering this, Guri decides to use her as Seiji's lover so that she will not die due to the effects of the Kiss Note. However, Akane approaches him which startles Seiji causing him to reveal his kiss to Guri. This causes Akane to fly into a psychotic rage, as she had noticed his "loving stares" and eventually developed strong feelings for him as well. She begins to accuse him of cheating with her and then stabs Guri in the head, then revealing her immortality. Eventually Guri gets the two to kiss, calming Akane down briefly before aggravating her again by revealing that she added her own name as well. While she does often attack Seiji (mostly for comic relief), it is because she truly loves him and wants him to pay more attention to her. Akane has a habit of pulling out endless number of Gurkha knives hidden in her clothes to fight. She gets extremely violent (sometimes by unconscious reflex) should anyone try and steal Seiji from her, especially Guri and Shikimi. After listening to Seiji's confession together with Yuzu one day, Akane decides to settle down the past and live together peacefully with Yuzu and Guri as well. In the end of manga, she becomes one of Seiji's brides alongside Yuzu and Guri in the wedding ceremony, and joins the Aino Family. She is now Akane Aino.
Yuzu Kichougasaki (黄蝶ヶ崎 袖, Kichōgasaki Yuzu)
Voiced by: Yuki Nagano (Japanese); Monica Rial (English)
Younger half-sister of Akane, sharing the same father. She is in love with Akane, both as a sister and as a woman, although she later also develops more feelings for Seiji as her life goes on. Immensely protective of her sister, Yuzu often stalks Akane wherever she goes (which Akane is fully aware of and pays no mind to). She becomes good friends with Guri and Seiji, despite an initial rocky start. Yuzu is also added into their harem, when Guri adds her name in the Kiss Note to Akane and Seiji's anger. Yuzu possesses the ability to conjure a powerful defensive barrier inherited from her family that can defend her from everything between Akane's Gurkha knives to an oncoming truck. Due to her barrier ability, Yuzu found it difficult to make friends in her youth as her peers feared her for it. Guri becomes fast friends with her, however, after complimenting her ability as cool and later sharing her love for male romance with Yuzu. Although she is shy towards Seiji, Yuzu managed to find the courage to kiss Seiji and gives a Valentine's gift to him. Upon Seiji's confession to her one day, Yuzu bursts into tears of happiness while hugging him together with Akane. In the end of manga, she becomes one of Seiji's brides alongside Akane and Guri in the wedding ceremony, and joins the Aino Family. She is now Yuzu Aino.
Shikimi Shiramine (白峰 樒, Shiramine Shikimi)
Voiced by: Yumi Hara (Japanese); Felecia Angelle (English)
The pink-haired, sadistic, hollow, and manipulative cousin of both Akane and Yuzu. Shikimi decides to enter Seiji's school in disguise upon discovering his relationship with Akane and Yuzu. She requests that Guri add her to his harem for the sole reason of gaining the immortality/divine protection due to being partnered to Guri. However, Guri rejects the request because she could tell there was no actual love in her for Seiji. Shikimi's favorite hobby is "afflicting people", as it is what brings her joy more than anything else. A running gag in the series is that Shikimi often angers Akane with her attempts to seduce or kiss Seiji. As the times flies, Shikimi had changed to a better person due to Seiji's forgiveness and a promise between Guri and her. She also befriends with Akane and Yuzu in the end.

=== Supporting ===
Akua Aino (藍野 あくあ, Aino Akua)
Voiced by: Rie Takahashi (Japanese); Madeleine Morris (English)
Seiji's tomboyish younger sister. During their childhood together, Akua was originally far more girly than her present age. However, she began to change herself when Seiji began spending less time with her in order to get his attention back. Despite this, Seiji failed to notice her to the point where it developed into animosity against Seiji, much to his confusion. Upon discovering Seiji's newfound harem, her discontent grows further, as she would rather have him to herself. Akua tends to injure Seiji whenever she is irritated with how ignorant Seiji is about her emotions. However, she still cares for him and jumps to defense, when he is insulted.
Coraly (コラリ, Korari)
Voiced by: Nobuyuki Hiyama (Japanese); Sonny Strait (English)
Guri's boss, a higher level angel who monitors the activities of Cupids under his jurisdiction. Unlike other angels, Coraly usually does not take a physical form on Earth, and often uses the Aino family's pet cat Blue as a vessel since his introduction. Coraly states that he has absolutely no understanding of the Human concept of Love, and has a tendency to refer to humans as lower level beings compared to himself. Coraly has a habit of being very vain about his appearance, especially when he uses his true form. A running gag in the series is that despite Coraly's assertion that his form is beautiful, most people find him scary instead and are unable to look directly at him. The only exception is Akua when she sees his true form for the first time, calling it beautiful to the shock of Seiji and the joy of Coraly, but his cat form still scares her off.
Kami (神様, Kamisama)
Voiced by: Hōchū Ōtsuka (Japanese); Barry Yandell (English)
The current God and Guri's father. Despite being the highest authority in Heaven, he often slacks off and uses his special television set to view events on earth freely. Has a habit of doting on his daughter and spying on her via his TV. He gives Seiji the mission to teach Guri about love so she can be a proper cupid and eventual God. He claims his wife left him due to loving all beings equally as his job demands.
Maou (魔王)
Voiced by: Takehito Koyasu (Japanese); J. Michael Tatum (English)
The current lord of Hell. Originally, Hell was ruled by Guri's mother Mavuro, his predecessor until she left after conceiving Guri. He has an inferiority complex, and considers himself unfit to rule Hell. Despite his pleas that Mavuro remain as the Devil Lord, he fails to convince her before she disappears. This causes him to turn to Guri as a potential successor since she is Mavuro's daughter and seek to drag her down to Hell by any means to accomplish this.
Tarō Tsuruoka (鶴岡 太郎, Tsuruoka Tarō)
Voiced by: Yasuaki Takumi (Japanese); Kyle Phillips (English)
Yuzu's personal attendant and chauffeur assigned to her by her mother, Ameisha. Despite the fact that he is supposed to report on Yuzu's actions to her mother, he often is forced into helping Yuzu stalk Akane. Tsuruoka tends to be very paranoid and prone to panicking over failing to do his job lest he face cruel punishment from Ameisha.
Stolas (ストラス, Sutorasu)
Voiced by: Kenyu Horiuchi (Japanese); Kenny Green (English)
Known by the public in Seiji's hometown as "Stolas the Demon". A sociopathic anthropomorphic penguin with violent tendencies, Stolas has a disturbing obsession with Seiji's younger sister Akua, intending to mate with her. He attacked the two as children but was locked in a cage until he broke out years later to chase down Akua once more. Stolas eventually develops an enmity with Coraly for Akua, being defeated by both after Akua overcomes her fear of him. He returns, being modified by a scientist who gave him a robotic armor and intended to use him as a weapon to destroy couples. This backfired when Stolas recognized Akua and reassumed his lustful agenda on his own, forcing Coraly to fight him once more, and in a final clash uses his divine powers to purify his wicked desires, turning Stolas into a normal penguin. After being returned to the aquarium he is matched with a male penguin by Guri.
Tiara (天亞薇, Teiara)
Voiced by: Eri Kitamura (Japanese); Jamie Marchi (English)
Guri's friend and an Angel/Cupid. She first appears to Seiji, Guri, and Yuzu after Guri's Kiss Note was burned, reassuring that the couples were still together. Since she wanted to retire and start a family, she gave away her Kiss Note, in the form of a smartphone, so Guri can still perform her duties.
Mavuro (マヴロ)
Voiced by: Yukari Tamura (Japanese); Bryn Apprill (English)
Guri's mother.
Suo Hiyama (緋山 蘇芳, Hiyama Suō)
Voiced by: Sayaka Ohara (Japanese); Colleen Clinkenbeard (English)
Akane's mother and the Matriarch of the Hiyama assassin clan. Often described as a beautiful yet emotionless woman, Suo fell in love with the same man as Ameisha did. Despite the three-way relationship doing well for some time, when their shared lover disappeared she buried herself in the affairs of her family business out of despair. Like her daughter Akane, Suo keeps a large stash of katanas hidden in her Yukata and is very proficient with them.
Ameisha Kichougasaki (黄蝶ヶ崎 アメイシャ, Kichōgasaki Ameisha)
Voiced by: Rina Satō (Japanese); Caitlin Glass (English)
Yuzu's mother and the Matriarch of the Kichougasaki clan. In contrast to the Hiyamas, the Kichougasaki clan specializes in guard detail. Ameisha, the Matriarch can only be described as the exact opposite of Suo. Loud, emotional, and far less conservative in dress, she clashes heavily with the stoic Suo. After their shared lover disappeared, Ameisha was hardly fazed by the event, instead choosing to move on without worrying. Ameisha, like her daughter, possesses a similar barrier ability yet with more advanced capabilities such as creating shock waves.

== Media ==
=== Manga ===
Written and illustrated by Megane Mihoshi, Love Tyrant was serialized online from May 2012 to January 2019 in Flex Comix Comic Meteor website. As of January 10, 2019, fourteen tankōbon volumes were released.

| No. | Release date | ISBN |
|---|---|---|
| 1 | March 12, 2013 | 978-4-5938-5725-8 |
| 2 | April 12, 2013 | 978-4-5938-5728-9 |
| 3 | August 12, 2013 | 978-4-5938-5748-7 |
| 4 | January 11, 2014 | 978-4-5938-5766-1 |
| 5 | June 12, 2014 | 978-4-5938-5782-1 |
| 6 | November 12, 2014 | 978-4-5938-5792-0 |
| 7 | May 12, 2015 | 978-4-5938-5804-0 |
| 8 | December 10, 2015 | 978-4-5938-5821-7 |
| 9 | August 9, 2016 | 978-4-5938-5839-2 |
| 10 | December 9, 2016 | 978-4-5938-5849-1 |
| 11 | April 11, 2017 | 978-4-5938-5858-3 |
| 11.5 | April 11, 2017 | 978-4-5938-5859-0 |
| 12 | December 9, 2017 | 978-4-5938-5874-3 |
| 13 | May 10, 2018 | 978-4-8667-5011-8 |
| 14 | January 10, 2019 | 978-4-8667-5044-6 |

=== Anime ===
The anime is directed by Atsushi Nigorikawa at studio EMT Squared with scripts written by Natsuko Takahashi and Monaca composed the music. The series aired from April 6 to June 22, 2017 on TV Tokyo, BS Japan and other channels. Crunchyroll streamed the series, while Funimation produced an English dub.

| No. | Title (Note: All English titles are taken from Crunchyroll.) | Original air date |
|---|---|---|
| 1 | "I'm Getting In on This, Too x Whoa! Forbidden Love?!"; Transliteration: "Watashi mo, Sansen Shimasu × Hoā!! Kindan no Ai Desu ka!!" (Japanese: 私も、参戦します × ほぁー!! 禁断の愛ですか!!) | April 6, 2017 |
A strange girl named Guri arrives at the house of Seiji Aino with a notebook called the "Kiss Note", which has the power to cause love between people. She claims that if Seiji does not kiss someone within 24 hours, he will remain a virgin forever, which Seiji misunderstands this and kisses her instead. The next day, Seiji's crush Akane Hiyama discovers Seiji and Guri's apparent relationship, and attempts to kill them both with Gurkha knives out of jealousy. Seiji and Akane eventually reconcile, as Guri reveals her status as an angel from Heaven, pairing them together with the Kiss Note, but not without including herself into the harem much to Akane's chagrin. Later, Guri's boss Coraly possesses the body of Seiji's cat Blue, informing Seiji and Akane that they have become immortal and must help Guri complete her duties as an angel or risk being sent to Hell. At school, a mysterious girl steals the Kiss Note, later revealed to be Akane's younger half-sister Yuzu Kichougasaki, who has telekinetic powers and also happens to be obsessed with Akane. Yuzu is ultimately incorporated into Seiji's harem by Guri as well.
| 2 | "Sniff Sniff x The Only One Who May Hurt Seiji-kun... Is Me"; Transliteration: "Kunsuka-kunsuka × Seiji-kun o Kizutsukete mo Ii no wa... Watashi Dake na no" (Japanese: くんすかくんすか × 青司くんを傷つけてもいいのは・・・・私だけなの) | April 13, 2017 |
Akane meets Seiji's tomboyish younger sister Akua Aino. Seiji confiscates the Kiss Note after discovering Guri and Yuzu are using the Kiss Note to pair up random students. Guri and Yuzu soon find a love poem written by a teacher named Nakito Kusunoki, who is in love with a student named Mari Shiina. Although Guri, Akane, and Yuzu believe that Kusunoki and Mari would make a great couple, Mari later admits to Seiji that she only sees Kusunoki as a little brother. Guri had planned on taking Mari hostage as a ruse for Kusunoki to rescue Mari. However, actual bank robbers take both Guri and Mari hostage. Seiji is shot in the arm while protecting Yuzu, who develops feelings for Seiji, though Kusunoki is too weak while trying to protect Mari. When Akane arrives, she violently attacks the bank robbers for shooting Seiji in the arm. Kusunoki confesses to Mari that his love for her would be inappropriate and will wait until the label of teacher and student no longer applies. After Mari reveals to Kusunoki that she has known all along, she privately tells Seiji that she secretly manipulated Kusunoki into falling in love with her.
| 3 | "I Can Handle This Myself! x Wassup"; Transliteration: "Watashi Hitori de Nantoka Dekiru! × Chorīssu" (Japanese: 私一人でなんとか出来る! × チョリーッス) | April 20, 2017 |
Akua learns that Seiji has three girlfriends, punishing him by scraping toothpaste in his eye. Yuzu forcibly attempts to befriend Akua, who slips out her own feelings for Seiji. Akua is approached by Stolas, a demonic penguin obsessed with her. Seiji arrives to save Akua after she jumps from a tree, while Stolas is arrested by the riot police. Seiji and Guri observe an argument between a cheating man named Yū and several women, but Seiji gets unintentionally pulled into the fight, causing the Kiss Note to be consequently burned. Coraly admits that he does not know what will happen since the Kiss Note has never been destroyed before. The next day, Akane ignores Seiji during school, concluding that his harem will break up. Seiji, Guri and Yuzu are approached by Tiara, another angel and Guri's friend, who reassures that the other couples are still together. Since Tiara is pregnant and retiring, she gives her Kiss Note in the form of a smartphone to Guri as a replacement. An upset Akane suddenly appears and kisses Seiji before stabbing him repeatedly. Guri fortunately restores the harem and immortality just in time in her new Kiss Note.
| 4 | "I'm Not Going to Lose! x Are You Like Me?"; Transliteration: "Zettai Makemasen kara! × Moshikashite o Nakama Desu ka?" (Japanese: 絶対負けませんから! × もしかしてお仲間ですか?) | April 27, 2017 |
Guri learns that Yuzu skips her actual school in order to stalk Akane. However, Akane was already aware of this and tell Yuzu to continue attending her actual school, causing Yuzu to run away in tears. After fending off a pervert, Yuzu falls into a river until Seiji arrives to rescue her. Though she admits her jealousy for not taking action sooner, Yuzu swears that she will win Akane's heart someday. The next day, as Seiji comes down with a cold, a girl named Shikimi Shiramine approaches Seiji and Guri for help with her crush, but Shikimi seemingly does not know his name. As Seiji and Shikimi take a walk together, he accidentally reveals that his harem is immortal. Meanwhile, Guri realizes that her Kiss Note has been stolen. Shikimi lures Seiji away and kidnaps him, as she unveils her true appearance as a pink-haired sadistic psychopath. Revealing the stolen Kiss Note, Shikimi tortures Seiji to find out how Guri grants immortality. Guri mentions to Akane and Yuzu about Shikimi, which enrages Akane and terrifies Yuzu.
| 5 | "What Is Love? x Kami Is Prostrating Himself Now lolol" Transliteration: "'Ai' tte Nani ka Nyā × Kami Dogeza Nau ww" (Japanese: '愛' って何かにゃー × 神土下座なうww) | May 4, 2017 |
Revealed to be Akane and Yuzu's cousin, Shikimi restrains Akane from Seiji, but Yuzu defends Akane from Shikimi. When Guri arrives, Shikimi attempts to manipulate her into join the harem, claiming that she is in love. Guri refuses because she senses that Shikimi is devoid of love. Shikimi suddenly receives a phone call from Akane's mother before she leaves, not long before swearing to join the harem someday. Seiji dies on Akane's lap, where he finds himself in Heaven. He meets with Coraly, who takes Seiji to see a clumsy geezer named Kami, who is the current God and Guri's father. While hanging out with Tiara and Coraly, Kami explains to Seiji that Guri will replace him as the new God someday. Seiji is tasked to teach Guri all about true love. The meeting is interrupted by Maou, the current ruler of Hell, who is determined to employ Guri as a demon. Seiji claims that Guri would not be interested in either role, seeing as she is far too free-spirited. Kami and Maou agree that Guri is still too immature, and Seiji returns to Earth in order to teach Guri all about true love.
| 6 | "Go to the Beach With Me? x It's Not a Matter of Knowing or Not"; Transliteration: "Issho ni Umi ni Ikanai ka? × Wakaru Wakaranai no Mondai ja Nai Desho" (Japanese: 一緒に海に行かないか？ × わかるわからないの問題じゃないでしょ) | May 11, 2017 |
Akua is invited to the beach by Seiji, but she is joined by the rest of his harem. While having fun there, a volleyball war erupts when Guri throws a volleyball into Akane's cleavage. Meanwhile, Seiji encounters Shikimi at a concession stand, but she blames him for making Akane lame. Shikimi explains that the Hiyama family who wield the magical spears is rivaled against the Kichougasaki family who bear the magical shields. Shikimi is convinced that Akane is too weak to survive the feud. This is proven true as Stolas, who has returned for Akua again, badly injures Akane during their fight, despite Akane's victory. That night at school, Seiji, Guri, Akane, and Yuzu attempt to help a couple prove their love by hunting ghosts. At the rooftop, Akane questions Guri if she truly loves Seiji. Akane tells Guri to stay away from Seiji because she is a nuisance. It turns out that the couple are actually ghosts who had fallen in love, while various lurking spirits refused to let them go to Heaven until their love was proven. Guri is left troubled by her own feelings.
| 7 | "It's a Festival x How Did It Come to This?!"; Transliteration: "Omatsuri jā × Dōshite Kō Natta~!!" (Japanese: お祭りじゃーい×どうしてこうなったぁ!!) | May 18, 2017 |
Guri becomes angry when Seiji refuses to go to a festival with her after already making plans with Akane and Yuzu. In the bookstore, Guri encounters a kindhearted guy who asks her on a date, where she constantly compares him with Seiji. At the festival, the guy tries to kiss her, but she rejects him because she cannot stop thinking about Seiji. She bumps into Seiji, who came to the festival to stop her earlier complaining. Despite his bad qualities, she kisses him after realizing that she is happiest when they are together. The guy was actually under mind control by Maou, who was eager to ruin the relationship between Seiji and Guri. Akane's mother Suo orders her to break up with Seiji. Soon after, Seiji is attacked by assassins, but Akua arrives to save him. Meanwhile, Yuzu is glad to befriend Guri, who appreciates Yuzu's invisible barrier which she had since childhood. An imprisoned Akane recalls when she first met Seiji and she fell in love with him almost instantaneously. Shikimi tells Seiji and Akua that the assassins worked for Suo, while Akane is locked up in the family household as punishment for falling in love.
| 8 | "Farewell x We're Rivals, Obviously!!"; Transliteration: "Sayonara × Koigataki (Raibaru) Desho!!" (Japanese: さよなら × 恋敵（ライバル）でしょ!!) | May 25, 2017 |
Yuzu's attendant Tarō Tsuruoka drives Guri and Yuzu to the Hiyama household, where Guri and Yuzu get past the assassins to see Akane, who shockingly attacks the two. Suo appears just as Seiji, Shikimi, Akua, and Coraly arrive. After throwing Coraly at Akua, Shikimi captures and tortures Seiji. As Suo orders Akane to kill Seiji, Akane hesitates and drops her sword after he brings her back to her senses. Yuzu's mother Ameisha arrives in rage and starts a duel with Suo. Akane and Yuzu explain that their mothers were once in a relationship with the same man, Akane and Yuzu’s father, but the relationship eventually soured, resulting in their family feud. Akane stops the fight by declaring that she is in love with Seiji and is staying with him no matter what. Suo eventually relents and allows Akane to continue dating Seiji, but she plans to eliminate him if Akane is hurt in any way. Akane is back to her normal self and now sees Guri as a rival. Suo explains to Ameisha that Yuzu has been in love with Akane while also dating Seiji. Ameisha chases Tsuruoka for not keeping her informed in the matter.
| 9 | "Absolutely... Nothing... x There's Just Something Wrong With Me..."; Transliteration: "Zenzen... Nani mo... × Chotto, Dōkashiteimashita..." (Japanese: 全然・・・何も・・・ × ちょっと、どうかしていました・・・) | June 1, 2017 |
Guri and Akane fight over Seiji outside school, and Akane ends up walking with him inside while Guri is left behind. In the classroom, Seiji and Akane learn that Shikimi is an official student at their school, ordered by both Suo and Ameisha to keep an eye on Seiji. To show Shikimi their success as a couple, Seiji and Akane plan to publicly kiss. Seiji agrees on the condition that Akane and Guri can get along. With the cultural festival soon approaching, the class decides to put on a play with Shikimi, Akane and Guri respectively as the princess, male knight and love rival. Yuzu later kisses Seiji at the stairwell, convincing herself that she feels nothing despite her conflicted feelings. During the play, Yuzu arrives late during Guri and Akane's quarrel and admits that she kissed Seiji to sort out her feelings. Akane forgives Yuzu, telling her to take all the time she needs. The play successfully ends when Akane kisses Guri, which somehow fulfills Seiji's condition. After the play, Yuzu claims that she detests Seiji but no longer hates him. Shikimi mentions that Guri will be left behind if Akane and Yuzu are getting closer to Seiji.
| 10 | "I'm Here to Stay the Night x I'm... Growing Up, Too"; Transliteration: "Otomari ni Kichaimashita × Watashi Datte... Seichō Surunda yo" (Japanese: お泊まりに来ちゃいました × 私だって・・・成長するんだよ) | June 8, 2017 |
Seiji is happy to have the house to himself for the first time in ages after Akua leaves for a sleepover, only for Akane, Guri, Yuzu and Shikimi to show up at his house one after the other. After spending the day with the girls, Seiji tries to take a bath, but his privacy is rudely interrupted. In the garden, Seiji shares a heartfelt kiss with Akane to keep his promise. The girls sleep in Seiji's bedroom while Seiji sleeps in the living room at night, but all the girls have moved into the living room with him by morning. When Akua returns, she punishes Seiji at the sight of four girls with him. Guri attempts to help an upset Akua receive more attention from Seiji with frilly clothes and fancy pastries, although Akua questions whether Guri has any actual feelings for Seiji. A vengeful Stolas has returned from the wilderness. At a playground, Coraly takes his angelic form and defends Akua from Stolas. However, Akua stands up to Stolas and kick him in the face. Seiji arrives, realizing that he will not protect Akua anymore. Shikimi leaves with Guri, while Seiji takes notice of Guri's disappearance.
| 11 | "Where Did She Go? x I Apologize for Troubling You Until Now"; Transliteration: "Doko Ittanda Aitsu × Ima Made Taihen Osewa ni Narimashita" (Japanese: どこ行ったんだ あいつ × 今まで大変お世話になりました) | June 15, 2017 |
Guri has been missing for over a week, and Coraly is concerned as to why Seiji has not taken it seriously. Suspecting Shikimi is responsible, Seiji confronts her in the locker room, but she captures and repeatedly kisses him, with Guri secretly watching outside. At a maid cafe, Guri previously confided in Shikimi that there was something missing between her and Seiji, in which Shikimi suggested Guri to avoid Seiji and observe his relationship with the other girls. Akane and Yuzu soon arrive to save Seiji, while Shikimi reveals the depressed Guri to the others. Seiji says that Guri has only been a nuisance to him, which causes her to seal herself in a cocoon of black feathers. Maou appears, having been working with Shikimi to manipulate Seiji into breaking the heart of Guri, who is now reborn as a demon. Guri nonchalantly announces that her old self is gone and it is all Seiji's fault. She then leaves and breaks up many couples that she brought together while being an angel. After Shikimi leaves with Maou, Yuzu convinces Seiji to join her and save Guri, although Akane refuses to accompany them.
| 12 | "Right, Let's All Die! x I Finally Understand"; Transliteration: "Sōda, Shinimashō! × Watashi Yatto Wakarimashita" (Japanese: そうだ、死にましょう！ × 私やっとわかりました) | June 22, 2017 |
Coraly takes Seiji and Yuzu to Heaven, where Kami suggests that they travel to Hell in order to retrieve Guri. Meanwhile, Guri refuses in becoming the new Devil so Maou would retire. While disguised as demonic businesspeople, Seiji, Yuzu, and Coraly are uncovered by Shikimi, which forces all of them to flee. They are rescued by Akane, who reached Hell after being shocked to death at the thought of Seiji already married with kids. After reaching the rooftop of the office building, Akane demands that Guri either return to normal or stay a demon forever. Seiji eventually realizes that Guri is not fully a demon after he pleads with her to become normal. As Guri become faint with overwhelming emotions, Seiji asks her what she wants. He jumps off the office building to catch her, as her demon wings are replaced with angel wings. She returns to normal, realizing that she wants him to love her. She kisses him but the heartfelt moment abruptly ends with Akane throwing a Gurka knife at Guri's head. Guri promises to add Shikimi to the harem if she behaves, further enraging Akane. The next day, Seiji heads to school with the four girls.

== Music ==
Opening Theme

- Koi? De ai? De bōkundesu! by Wake Up, Girls!

Ending Theme

- (Suki) de Oshiete by smileY inc. (Expect 12)
- (Suki) de Oshiete Kuta Sai by Yoshino Aoyama (Episode 12)
