= Tasokare Hotel =

2017 video game

- Game visual

誰ソ彼ホテル (Tasokare Hoteru)
- Genre: Mystery, supernatural
- Created by: Benoma Ray; SEEC
- Video game
- Developer: SEEC
- Publisher: SEEC
- Platform: Android, iOS
- Released: Android: WW: December 19, 2017; iOS: WW: December 22, 2017
Further information
Video game
Tasokare Hotel Re:newal
Developer	SEEC
Publisher	SEEC
Platform	iOS, Android, Windows
Released	iOS, Android: JP: December 13, 2022; Windows: JP: January 23, 2024
Manga
Illustrated by	Retsuna; Aisu Konjō
Published by	Vivion
Magazine	Comipo
Original run	December 26, 2024 – present
Anime television series
Directed by	Kōsuke Koremizu
Music by	Tsujiyo; sugarbeans
Studio	PRA
Licensed by	Remow
Original network	Tokyo MX, BS NTV, SUN, AT-X, NCC
Original run	January 8, 2025 – March 26, 2025
Episodes	12
Video game
Tasokare Hotel: Tsubomi
Developer	SEEC
Publisher	SEEC
Platform	iOS, Android
Released	JP: March 31, 2025

Tasokare Hotel (Japanese: 誰ソ彼ホテル, Hepburn: Tasokare Hoteru) is a Japanese mobile game created by Benoma Ray and SEEC. It was released for iOS and Android mobile devices in December 2017, and has been downloaded over 1.1 million times. A remake titled Tasokare Hotel Re:newal was released in Japan for iOS and Android in December 2022, with a PC port releasing on Steam in January 2024. An anime television series adaptation produced by PRA aired from January to March 2025. A sequel titled Tasokare Hotel: Tsubomi was released in March 2025 and closed in November 2026.

== Plot ==
A teenage girl named Neko Tsukahara is severely injured, and she awakens without her memories to find the Tasokare Hotel, a place for dying souls to stay that is between the living world and the afterlife. She quickly becomes an employee there, and is tasked with researching the guests' past lives to remind them of their identities so they can move on from the hotel to the afterlife or come back to life.

== Characters ==
Neko Tsukahara (塚原音子, Tsukahara Neko)
Voiced by: Rika Momokawa
An idol fan who wakes up at a mysterious hotel called Tasokare Hotel with no memories of her past. She finds work at the hotel and tries to help its guests recover their memories.
Atori Haruto (阿鳥遥斗, Haruto Atori)
Voiced by: Kōdai Sakai
Masaki Osoto (大外聖生, Osoto Masaki)
Voiced by: Yusuke Shirai
Hotel Manager (支配人, Shihainin)
Voiced by: Kanehira Yamamoto
Ruri (ルリ)
Voiced by: Yuki Nagano
Menow (瑪瑙, Menou)
Voiced by: Natsue Sasamoto
Kiriko (切子)
Voiced by: Takashi Narumi

== Other media ==
=== Webtoon ===
A webtoon adaptation with art by Retsun and Aisu Konjō began serialization online on Vivion's Comipo website on December 26, 2024.

=== Anime ===
An anime television series adaptation was announced on June 24, 2024. It is produced by PRA and directed by Kōsuke Koremizu, with characters designed by Yūko Hariba, and music composed by Tsujiyo and sugarbeans. The series aired from January 8 to March 26, 2025, on Tokyo MX and other networks. The opening theme song is "Tasokare", performed by Kayoko Yoshizawa, while the ending theme song is "Twilight", performed by Rib. Remow licensed the series and announced worldwide streaming on Amazon Prime Video and the It's Anime YouTube channel.

==== Episodes ====
No.	Title	Directed by (Note: Production staff information is taken from the ending credits of each episode.)	Written by	Storyboarded by	Original release date (Note: Episodes are released on ABEMA and streaming platforms by Remow 5 days before their televised airings.)
1	"Twilight Girl"; Transliteration: "Tasogare Shōjo" (Japanese: 黄昏少女)	Takahashi Shiho; Kosuke Kosui	Rika Takasugi	Kosuke Kosui	January 8, 2025
2	"The Bet of a Lifetime"; Transliteration: "Jinsei no Kake" (Japanese: 人生の賭け)	Shigeru Kimiya	Akemi Mende	Shigeru Kimiya	January 15, 2025
3	"The Blood-Soaked Pansy"; Transliteration: "Chi Nure no Pansy" (Japanese: 血濡れの三色菫)	Hodaka Kuramoto	Megumi Sasano	Yoko Yanai	January 22, 2025
4	"Friendship and Responsibility"; Transliteration: "Yūjō to Sekinin" (Japanese: 友情と責任)	Masao Arai; Yoshitaka Koyama	Benoma Rei; Kosuke Kosui	Miura Soken; Kosuke Kosui	January 29, 2025
5	"The Seaside Ash-covered Princess"; Transliteration: "Umibe no Hai Kaburi-hime" (Japanese: 海辺の灰かぶり姫)	Shunji Yoshida	Kosuke Kosui	Kosuke Kosui	February 5, 2025
6	"Space and Music"; Transliteration: "Uchū to Ongaku" (Japanese: 宇宙と音楽)	Yasushi Muroya	Akemi Omode	Akemi Omode	February 12, 2025
7	"A Carousel and Brass Knuckles"; Transliteration: "Kaiten Mokuba to Kobushi Tsuba" (Japanese: 回転木馬と拳鍔)	Yuri Pinzon; Elijah Ragas	Megumi Sasano	Hiroshi Oyama; Kosuke Kosui	February 19, 2025
8	"The Idol Girl"; Transliteration: "Gūzō no Shōjo" (Japanese: 偶像の少女)	Yuko Hariba	Goichi Iwahata	Taishi Kato	February 26, 2025
9	"A Girl's True Face"; Transliteration: "Shōjo no Sugao" (Japanese: 少女の素顔)	Yuko Hariba	Goichi Iwahata	Taishi Kato	March 5, 2025
10	"The Hidden Room"; Transliteration: "Kakushi Heya" (Japanese: 隠し部屋)	Shigeru Kimiya	Megumi Sasano	Shigeru Kimiya	March 12, 2025
11	"Handguns and Hell"; Transliteration: "Kenjū to Jigoku" (Japanese: 拳銃と地獄)	Masao Arai; Yoshitaka Koyama	Rika Takasugi	Yoshitaka Koyama; Kosuke Kosui	March 19, 2025
12	"Revenge"; Transliteration: "Ribenji" (Japanese: リベンジ)	Takahashi Shiho	Benoma Rei; Kosuke Kosui	Kosuke Kosui	March 26, 2025

=== Stage play ===
A stage play adaptation ran in Ueno's Hikosen Theater from April 24 to May 4, 2025.
