= The Hidden Dungeon Only I Can Enter =

Japanese light novel series and its franchise

- First light novel volume cover, featuring (clockwise from bottom left) Noir, Luna, Lola, and Emma

俺だけ入れる隠しダンジョン 〜こっそり鍛えて世界最強〜 (Ore Dake Haireru Kakushi Danjon ~Kossori Kitaete Sekai Saikyō~)
- Genre: Fantasy, harem
- Novel series
- Written by: Meguru Seto
- Published by: Shōsetsuka ni Narō
- Original run: January 5, 2017 – February 2, 2021
- Light novel
- Written by: Meguru Seto
- Illustrated by: Note Takehana
- Published by: Kodansha
- English publisher: NA: Seven Seas Entertainment
- Imprint: Kodansha Ranobe Books
- Original run: August 1, 2017 – present
- Volumes: 6
- Manga
- Written by: Meguru Seto
- Illustrated by: Tomoyuki Hino
- Published by: Kodansha
- English publisher: NA: Seven Seas Entertainment
- Magazine: Suiyōbi no Sirius
- Original run: May 2, 2018 – June 20, 2023
- Volumes: 12
- Anime television series
- Directed by: Kenta Ōnishi
- Produced by: Hiroshi Kamei; Nohukio Kurosu; Naoya Satou; Airi Sawada
- Written by: Kenta Ihara
- Music by: Kanako Hara
- Studio: Okuruto Noboru
- Licensed by: Crunchyroll (streaming); SEA: Bilibili (streaming)
- Original network: JNN (MBS, TBS, BS-TBS), AT-X
- Original run: January 9, 2021 – March 27, 2021
- Episodes: 12
- icon

The Hidden Dungeon Only I Can Enter (俺だけ入れる隠しダンジョン 〜こっそり鍛えて世界最強〜, Ore Dake Haireru Kakushi Danjon ~Kossori Kitaete Sekai Saikyō~) (Note: Also known as Special Training in the Secret Dungeon as this title is seen on the cover of the Japanese version of the light novel.) is a Japanese fantasy light novel series written by Meguru Seto and illustrated by Note Takehana. It was serialized online from January 2017 to February 2021 on the user-generated novel publishing website Shōsetsuka ni Narō. It was later acquired by Kodansha, who have published six volumes since August 2017 under their Kodansha Ranobe Books imprint. A manga adaptation with art by Tomoyuki Hino was serialized via Kodansha's Niconico-based Suiyōbi no Sirius manga service from May 2018 to June 2023. It has been collected in twelve tankōbon volumes. Both the light novel and manga are licensed in North America by Seven Seas Entertainment. An anime television series adaptation by Okuruto Noboru aired from January to March 2021 on the Animeism programming block.

== Synopsis ==
Hidden dungeons are a place of legends where rare treasures and items are concealed. Some are lucky to find them, like Noir Stardia, the third son of a minor noble family, who acquires an exceptional skill that provides him great knowledge. As a result, however, it causes him to have painful headaches. Noir is given a job offer by his childhood friend Emma Brightness, who has a cure for his headaches. After Noir encounters difficulty with employment, he wishes to become an adventurer and finds a dungeon and the legendary adventurer Olivia Servant, who has been trapped inside for centuries. Olivia gives Noir three powerful skills, which he uses to improve his power and enroll at the Hero Academy.

== Characters ==
Noir Stardia (ノル・スタルジア, Noru Sutarujia)
Voiced by: Ryōta Ōsaka (Japanese); Zeno Robinson (English)
Noir is the third son of a baronet, a noble of the lowest rank, who is a self-proclaimed coward who would like to take it easy. Upon not receiving a job as a librarian due to interference from more prominent nobles, Noir begins his journey to become a hero seeking other employment through attending the adventurer's/hero academy. He is originally born with the rare [Great Sage] Skill, which grants him unlimited knowledge for a time, but gives him terrible headaches after each use, so he refrains from using it until he learns from Emma that kissing her helps alleviate some of the pain, they start kissing and hanging out many times, also hugging and flirting with each other, showing the affection and love they fell for each other while also gaining LP for that. During an exploration of a secret dungeon, he meets Olivia, who bestows him the power to freely upgrade his and other people's powers [Create], [Bestow], and [Edit] by expending LP (Life Points), which are obtained by having joyful experiences but at the risk of dying if his LP is fully depleted. He has been in love with Emma since childhood, and dreams of marrying her.
Emma Brightness (エマ・ブライトネス, Ema Buraitonesu)
Voiced by: Miyu Tomita (Japanese); Lizzie Freeman (English)
Emma is Noir's childhood friend and his first love. She willingly allows Noir to kiss her, which helps relieve his [Great Sage] aftereffects. She initially started a part-time job as a librarian to work beside Noir only to find he did not get it and then quits shortly afterward to take the heroes exam with Noir just to stay by his side. Due to her appearance, Emma is very popular with the opposite sex, including Noir. Out of the girls, she is the one Noir spends the most time with. Emma loves Noir and plans on marrying him.
Lola Metrose (ローラ・メトラーゼ, Rōra Metorāze)
Voiced by: Rumi Okubo (Japanese); Anne Yatco (English)
Lola works at Odin as a receptionist who provides Noir's quests. She is very smitten with Noir, even tolerating his unintentional harem building.
Olivia Servant (オリヴィア・サーヴァント, Orivia Sāvanto)
Voiced by: Yui Horie (Japanese); Janice Kawaye (English)
Olivia is an adventurer who becomes Noir's master, helping him to grow stronger in hopes that one day he can become powerful enough to break her free from the Death Chains.
Luna Heela (ルナ・ヒーラー, Runa Hīrā)
Voiced by: Akari Kitō (Japanese); Kira Buckland (English)
Luna is a half-elf saintess/cleric who is Lola's best friend. She is introduced into the story as a solution towards solving the curse of a duke's daughter who happens to go to the same adventurer's school as Noir and Emma. As a famous cleric, her skills are quite unique with her being one of very few with curse purification skills; it initially shortened her lifespan, but Noir alters it to instead decrease Luna's finances. After her short adventure together with Noir on purifying the curse, she develops a crush on Noir, to the dismay of Emma and Lola.
Alice Stardia (アリス・スタルジア, Arisu Sutarujia)
Voiced by: Yuki Nagano (Japanese); Ryan Bartley (English)
Noir's younger sister. The youngest of four siblings, she has a brother complex towards Noir.

== Media ==
=== Light novel ===
Originally serialized as a web novel on Shōsetsuka ni Narō, Kodansha published the first volume of the light novel series in print on August 1, 2017, under their Kodansha Ranobe Books imprint. The series is licensed in North America by Seven Seas Entertainment.

==== Volumes ====
No.	Original release date	Original ISBN	English release date	English ISBN
1	August 1, 2017	978-4-06-365038-9	July 2, 2020 (digital); October 13, 2020 (print)	978-1-64505-842-7
Chapter 1: "The Great Sage Skill"; Chapter 2: "Powerful Skill Set"; Chapter 3: "Bestowing Strange Skills on Things!"; Chapter 4: "Hero Academy"; Chapter 5: "That Score Can't Be Right!"; Chapter 6: "A Poor Noble's Gotta Eat"; Chapter 7: "The Receptionist Doesn't Believe Me!"; Chapter 8: "That Time More Experienced Adventurers Made Fun of Me"; Chapter 9: "Headache Relief and the Rainbow Grasshopper"; Chapter 10: "The Curse Skill"; Chapter 11: "I Wanna Nibble on You"; Chapter 12: "Meat Makes a Body Strong"; Chapter 13: "That Which Lurks on the Fourth Floor..."; Chapter 14: "Even Receptionists Need a Living"; Chapter 15: "The First Day of School"; Chapter 16: "Fancy Footwork"; Chapter 17: "Things Not to Do During Class"; Chapter 18: "A Smelly Pair"; Chapter 19: "Of Trolls and Grasshoppers"; Chapter 20: "Olivia's Lessons"; Chapter 21: "The Monster Den on the Fifth Floor"; Chapter 22: "Luna, the Untainted Cleric"; Chapter 23: "Let's Throw Our Hats in the Ring!"; Chapter 24: "Now That's What I Call a Harem"; Chapter 25: "Shoulder Message"; Chapter 26: "Salvation"; Chapter 27: "Epilogue"; Extra Chapter: "Olivia's Apprentice"; Extra Chapter: "A Little Sister's Job"; Extra Chapter: "I'll See You Tomorrow"
2	December 1, 2017	978-4-06-365046-4	September 10, 2020 (digital); December 8, 2020 (print)	978-1-64505-845-8
Chapter 1: Payday!; Chapter 2: The Tulip Lion Appears!; Chapter 3: Tigerson; Chapter 4: Zombification; Chapter 5: Friends; Chapter 6: One of the Family; Chapter 7: Another Exam Begins; Chapter 8: Lola's Battle; Chapter 9: Tiptoeing Through the Graveyard; Chapter 10: Everything Is Going Swimmingly; Chapter 11: Bullseye; Chapter 12: Forest of Gold; Chapter 13: You Can't Let Your Guard Down on the Seventh Floor; Chapter 14: Little Dory's Wish; Chapter 15: I'll Ask My Master; Chapter 16: Monster vs. Monster; Chapter 17: Finally Going Home; Chapter 18: Luna's Savings; Chapter 19: Amon Village!; Chapter 20: Just Be Honest; Chapter 21: Magic Eater; Chapter 22: Time to Head Out!; Chapter 23: Wrecking Havoc in the Thieves' Hideout; Chapter 24: The Boss of the Thieves; Chapter 25: Triumphant Return; Chapter 26: Lola's Special Message Course; Chapter 27: Anti-Dragon Countermeasures; Chapter 28: Off to Treasure Mountain; Chapter 29: The Earth Dragon; Chapter 30: Hard Work Pays off in the End; Extra Chapter: From Hell to Heaven; Extra Chapter: Arranged Marriage; Extra Chapter: A Strange Holiday
3	May 2, 2018	978-4-06-511910-5	December 24, 2020 (digital); March 23, 2021 (print)	978-1-64827-112-0
Chapter 1: Summer Vacation; Chapter 2: Item Conversion; Chapter 3: What Goes Around Comes Around; Chapter 4: Leila and the Dangerous Wall; Chapter 5: Bad Children Can't Hide from Meeee!; Chapter 6: Safe and Sound Isn't Always Safe as It Sounds; Chapter 7: The Treasure Room Reeks of Danger; Chapter 8: The Treasure Chest of Darkness; Chapter 9: If It's Too Big, Just Make It Smaller; Chapter 10: A Swift Reunion; Chapter 11: To the Gala; Chapter 12: The Shadow Creeping Through the Gala; Chapter 13: Dance Your Heart Out!; Chapter 14: The Phantom Takes the Stage; Chapter 15: Summoned Warriors; Chapter 16: The Phantom Thief and the Phoenix; Chapter 17: You Can't Fool Me!; Chapter 18: After the Battle; Chapter 19: Pretty Girl Rice Ball; Chapter 20: Fun with a Bonefish; Chapter 21: Dog Beam; Chapter 22: Let's Go the Hot Springs!; Chapter 23: Run-in with the Pixies; Chapter 24: An Unbelievable Victory; Chapter 25: The Battle of the Hot Springs; Chapter 26: Home Again; Chapter 27: The Path of Laughter; Chapter 28: The Path of Anger; Chapter 29: Home Sweet Home; Extra Chapter: Happiness in Both Hands
4	January 9, 2019	978-4-06-514688-0	April 22, 2021 (digital); June 15, 2021 (print)	978-1-64827-221-9
Chapter 1: A Letter from My Brother; Chapter 2: Setting Off; Chapter 3: On the Road; Chapter 4: The Petrifying Woman; Chapter 5: Honest, the School Town; Chapter 6: The General and the Archer; Chapter 7: I Want to Master the Bow; Chapter 8: The Hero's Village; Chapter 9: The Hidden Cellar; Chapter 10: Battle Is Always Sudden; Chapter 11: The Hero's Parting Gift; Chapter 12: False Hero; Extra Chapter: Olivia's Memories
5	March 2, 2020	978-4-06-519269-6	August 19, 2021 (digital); September 28, 2021 (print)	978-1-64827-298-1
Chapter 1: Staying Behind; Chapter 2: The Man Named Iesu; Chapter 3: Good and Evil; Chapter 4: I'm Home!; Chapter 5: The Blind Date and the Arena; Chapter 6: The Little Person and the Copy; Chapter 7: The Fake Olivia; Extra Chapter: Beyond Eternity
6	December 2, 2020	978-4-06-521767-2	February 10, 2022 (digital); March 1, 2022 (print)	978-1-63858-129-1
Chapter 1: An Order from My Master; Chapter 2: Item Conversion; Chapter 3: Mira Santage; Chapter 4: The Monkey and the Present; Chapter 5: Hunting for Items; Chapter 6: The King of the School Year Competition; Chapter 7: I'd Give My Left Arm; Chapter 8: Face to Face; Chapter 9: Inter-school Tournament; Bonus Chapter: New Knowledge

=== Manga ===
A manga adaptation by Tomoyuki Hino was serialized on Kodansha's Niconico-based Suiyōbi no Sirius manga service from May 2, 2018, to June 20, 2023. Kodansha has compiled its chapters into individual tankōbon volumes. Twelve volumes were published from December 6, 2018, to April 9, 2024. Seven Seas Entertainment has also licensed the manga and published the first volume on November 17, 2020.

==== Volumes ====
No.	Original release date	Original ISBN	English release date	English ISBN
1	December 6, 2018	978-4-06-513779-6	November 17, 2020	978-1-64505-843-4
1. "The Great Sage Skill" (大賢者スキル, Dai kenja sukiru); 2. "The Get Creative Skill" (創作スキル, Sōsaku sukiru); 3. "Discerning Eye" (鑑定眼, Kantei me); 4. "Stone Bullet, Improved" (石弾・改, Ishi dan aratame); 5. "Headache Immunity" (頭痛耐性, Zutsū taisei); 6. "Dual Wielded Daggers" (両手短剣術, Ryōte tanken-jutsu); 7. "'The Sixteenth Year Death Curse'" (【十六の死印】, [Jūroku no shi shirushi])
2	May 9, 2019	978-4-06-515277-5	January 19, 2021	978-1-64827-111-3
8. "Fancy Footwork" (バックステップ強化, Bakku suteppu kyōka); 9. "'Breakfall'" (【受身】, [Ukemi]); 10. "Luna the Cleric" (聖女ルナ, Seijo Runa); 11. "Close Friend" (親友, Shin'yū); 12. "Insult Tournament" (誹謗中傷大会, Hibou chūshō taikai); 13. "The Curse" (呪いの功罪, Noroi no kōzai); 14. "Apprentice" (弟子, Deshi); Extra (エクストラ, Ekusutora)
3	December 4, 2019	978-4-06-516378-8	July 13, 2021	978-1-64827-256-1
15. "Tigerson" (虎丸, Toramaru); 16. "Two of One Million" (99万分の2, 99 man bunno 2); 17. "The Femme Fatale Receptionist" (傾城の受付嬢, Keisei no uketsuke jō); 18. "'Magical Fusion'" (【魔法融合】, [Mahō yūgō]); 19. "Young Emma" (幼きエマ, Osanaki Ema); 20. "Little Dory" (ドリちゃん, Dori-chan); 21. "'Target'" (【標的】, [Hyōteki]); 22. "Droplet of Plenty" (豊穣の雫, Hōjō no shizuku)
4	May 8, 2020	978-4-06-519276-4	November 16, 2021	978-1-64827-343-8
23. "'Left Hand of Misfortune'" (【不幸の左手】, [Fukō no hidarite]); 24. "Two Vows" (【2人の誓い】, [Futari no chikai]); 25. "Persimmon, Sea Bream, Pomegranate" (カキタイザクロ, Kakitaizakuro); 26. "The Phantom Thief" (怪盗ファントム, Kaitō fantomu); 27. "The Phantom's Targets" (ファントムの標的, Fantomu no hyōteki); 28. "Cerberus" (ケルベロス, Keruberosu); 29. "Mike's True Identity" (マイクの正体, Maiku no shōtai); Extra (エクストラ, Ekusutora)
5	December 9, 2020	978-4-06-520877-9	March 15, 2022	978-1-63858-123-9
30. "The Ultimate Skill Set" (最強スキルセット, Saikyō sukiru setto); 31. "The Worst Nightmare" (最悪の悪夢, Saiaku no akumu); 32. "The Hairclip" (髪留め, Kamitome); 33. "Noblesse Oblige" (ノブレス・オブリージュ, Noburesu oburīju); 34. "Hot Springs Trip" (温泉旅行, Onsen ryokō); 35. "Mixed Bathing" (混浴, Kon'yoku); 36. "Shield of Champions" (覇者の盾, Hasha no tate); 37. "Grown-up Kiss" (大人キス, Otona kisu); 38. "Competition Over Noir" (ノル争奪戦, Noru sōdatsu-sen); Extra (エクストラ, Ekusutora)
6	February 9, 2021	978-4-06-522060-3	May 17, 2022	978-1-63858-248-9
39. "Gorilla Power" (ゴリラパワー, Gorira pawā); 40. "The City of Honest" (ホーネストの街, Hōnesuto no machi); 41. "Big Brother's Message" (兄の伝言, Ani no dengon); 42. "General Stey" (ステイ将軍, Sutei shōgun); 43. "Disgraceful One" (穢れし者, Kegare shi-sha); 44. "Exquisite Skills" (妙技, Myōgi); 45. "Communication Rings" (コミュニケーションリング, Komyunikēshon ringu); 46. "Sumo Wrestling" (スモーレスリング, Sumō resuringu); 47. "Poonoir" (プーノル, Pūnoru); 48. "Silver Slime" (白銀スライム, Shirogane suraimu)
7	June 9, 2021	978-4-06-523213-2	October 4, 2022 (digital); December 27, 2022 (print)	978-1-63858-727-9
49. "The True Nature of Tonnelles" (トネル村の正体, Toneru mura no shōtai); 50. "Perpetual Youth and Immorality" (不老不死, Furōfushi); 51. "Massive Assault" (大襲来, Dai shūrai); 52. "Cause of the Great Invasion" (大侵攻の元凶, Dai shinkō no genkyō); 53. "The Guardian" (ガーディアン, Gādian); 54. "A New Hero" (新英雄, Shin eiyū); 55. "The Truth of 200 Years Ago" (200年前の真実, Nihyaku nen mae no shinjitsu); 56. "Premonition of 200 Years Later" (200年後の予感, Nihyaku nen go no yokan)
8	December 9, 2021	978-4-06-525977-1	May 9, 2023	978-1-68579-530-6
57. "Clues about The Cursed Death Chains" (死鎖呪の手がかり, Shi kusari noroi no tegakari); 58."'Pocket Dimension'" (【異空間保存】, 【I kūkan hozon】); 59. "Oath to Repay a Debt" (恩返し宣言, Ongaeshi sengen); 60. "Second Year King Championship" (学年王決定戦, Gakunen-ō kettei-sen); 61. "Bell of Perception" (知らせの鈴, Shirase no suzu); 62. "The Girl Named Mira" (ミラという少女, Mira to iu shōjo); 63. "Magic Item Mastery" (魔道具マスター, Ma dōgu masutā); 64. "Drinking Contest" (飲み比べ勝負, Nomi kurabe shōbu); 65. "The Contest's Outcome" (勝負の行方, Shōbu no yukue); Extra (エクストラ, Ekusutora)
9	June 9, 2022	978-4-06-528148-2	August 8, 2023	979-8-88843-003-3
66. "Bathroom Love♡" (風呂場ラブ♡, Furoba rabu ♡); 67. "To Be Blessed to Be a Sword" (剣冥利, Ken myōri); 68. "Way of the Badges" (バッジの行方, Bajji no yukue); 69. "'Telekinesis'" (【念力】, [Nenriki]); 70. "Way of the Badges, Continued" (続・バッジの行方, Zoku bajji no yukue); 71. "'Telekinesis' Once Again" (【念力】再び, [Nenriki] futatabi); 72. "The Challenger" (挑戦者, Chōsensha); 73. "Champion's Special Privilege" (優勝者の特典, Yūshōsha no tokuten); 74. "Interschool Match" (交流試合, Kōryū shiai); 75. "The Final Bout" (大将戦, Taishō-sen); Extra (エクストラ, Ekusutora)
10	December 8, 2022	978-4-06-529867-1	January 30, 2024	979-8-88843-131-3
76. "'Cut Spacetime'" (【空間切開】, [Kūkan sekkai]); 77. "Most Valuable Player" (最優秀選手, Saiyūshū senshu); 78. "Partners" (パートナー, Pātonā); 79. "Copy" (コピー, Kopī); 80. "Cookie Game ♡" (クッキーゲーム♡, Kukkīgēmu ♡); 81. "Studying Abroad" (留学, Ryūgaku); 82. "Meledy" (メレディ, Meredi); 83. "Contact" (接触, Sesshoku); 84. "A Helping Hand" (助け船, Tasukebune); 85. "Pokopy" (ポコピィ, Pokopyi); 86. "An Explosive Situation" (一触即発, Isshoku sokuhatsu)
11	May 9, 2023	978-4-06-531658-0	July 2, 2024	979-8-88843-801-5
87. "Lovely Support" (すてきな応援, Sutekina ōen); 88. "A Sudden Twist" (急転直下, Kyūtenchokka); 89. "A Suspect" (容疑者, Yōgisha); 90. "Nord" (ノルド, Norudo); 91. "Purple and Pink" (紫とピンク, Murasaki to pinku); 92. "Undercover Operation" (囮捜査, Otori sōsa); 93. "Into Enemy Territory" (敵地へ, Tekichi e); 94. "'Confession Skill'" (【自白スキル】, [Jihaku sukiru]); 95. "Contraception Nuts" (避妊の実, Hinin no mi); 96. "A Night for Just Two" (二人きりの夜, Futarikiri no yoru); 97. "End Results of Training" (特訓の成果, Tokkun no seika); 98. "10% Chance of Victory" (10％の勝機, Jū pāsento no shōki)
12	April 9, 2024	978-4-06-535029-4	January 7, 2025	979-8-89160-663-0
99. "The 'Sacrifice' Skill" (【生け贄】スキル, [Ikenie] sukiru); 100. "True Motives of the Death Chains" (死鎖呪の本音, Shikusari noroi no hon'ne); 101. "Morph" (変化, Henka); 102. "Final Warning" (最後通告, Saigo tsūkoku); 103. "Compensation Towards the Future" (未来への代償, Mirai e no daishō); 104. "Farewell to the Three Great Skills" (さよなら、３大スキル, Sayonara, sandai sukiru); 105. "Marvelous Development" (素晴らしき成長, Subarashiki seichō); Side Story: "Playing Delightful Doctor" (愉快なお医者さんごっこ, Yukaina oisha-san gokko)

=== Anime ===
An anime television series adaptation was announced by Kodansha on May 8, 2020. The series was animated by Okuruto Noboru and directed by Kenta Ōnishi, with Kenta Ihara handling series composition, and Yuya Uetake designing the characters. The series aired from January 9 to March 27, 2021, on the Animeism block on MBS, TBS, BS-TBS, and AT-X, with Crunchyroll streaming the series worldwide outside of Asia. (Note: MBS listed the series premiere at 26:25 on January 8, 2021, which is January 9 at 2:25 a.m.) In Southeast Asia, Bilibili streamed the series. The opening theme song (from episode 2 onwards) is "Pyramid Great Reversal" (ピラミッド大逆転, Piramiddo Dai Gyakuten) performed by Spira Spica, while the ending theme song is "Nemophila" (ネモフィラ, Nemofira) performed by COALAMODE. The series ran for 12 episodes. On February 8, 2021, Crunchyroll announced the series would receive an English dub, which premiered on February 26.

==== Episodes ====
No.	Title (Note: All English titles are taken from Crunchyroll.)	Directed by	Written by	Original release date
1	"Powerful Skill Set"; Transliteration: "Kyōretsu Sukiru Setto" (Japanese: 強烈スキルセット)	Kenta Ōnishi	Kenta Ihara	January 9, 2021
After Noir, a baronet's son, loses his job, his younger sister, Alice, suggests he attend Hero Academy. His friend Emma believes he will succeed since Noir possesses the rare magic skill Great Sage, which reveals the correct answer to any question but causes crippling headaches. Emma reveals a former Great Sage alleviated his headaches by kissing his wives and embarrassingly requests Noir kiss her. Noir finds his headache gone and learns from Great Sage great strength lies in a hidden dungeon. There, Noir finds the famous heroine Olivia bound by Death Chains. As such, she gifts Noir her skills: Get Creative, Bestow and Editor. However, they requires LP points, which are generated by feeling satisfaction. At the academy entrance exam, they are told to gather rare materials in groups of three. Being only a baronet's son, Noir is ignored by most of the nobles and teams with Emma and Lenore Bludon. Noir returns to the dungeon alone and uses Olivia's skills to defeat a Dead Reaper. With the exam over, the Reaper's skull is revealed as an extremely rare material and they set a new academy record.
2	"The Guild and the Receptionist"; Transliteration: "Girudo to Uketsukejō" (Japanese: ギルドと受付嬢)	Yū Yabūchi	Kenta Ihara	January 16, 2021
Noir's father cannot afford the 300,000 gold academy fee, so Noir must earn it himself. Reluctant to draw more attention by slaying another rare monster, Noir decides to join the Odin Adventurer's guild. The receptionist, Lola, is furious when he claims to have Olivia's skills, since Olivia was a guild member 200 years ago. She wagers him to prove it and is forced to apologize while flashing her panties when he does. For his first quest, Noir collects rare Rainbow Grasshoppers, using Great Sage to locate them and earning 250,000 gold. Seeing how capable he is, Lola develops a crush on him. Noir and Emma next hunt a Big Rabbit, a magical 20-feet-tall beast. After it proves too strong, Emma becomes depressed and Noir has the inspiration to use Get Creative to improve her skills, but is forced to nibble erotically on her ear in order to generate enough LP, including an accidental panty shot. With the rabbit defeated and enough gold to pay his fees, Noir shares the rabbit meat in a feast with the rest of the guild. Elsewhere, Olivia is annoyed Noir has not visited in a while.
3	"The Troubled Classmate"; Transliteration: "Wakeari Dōkyūsei" (Japanese: ワケあり同級生)	Michita Shiraishi	Kenta Ihara	January 23, 2021
On their first day, Noir meets Maria Fianna Albert, a duke's daughter, and with his Discerning Eye realizes she is cursed to die on her 16th birthday. Noir is ignored by his classmates, since baronet is a title awarded to commoners for service to the kingdom. As such, Maria goes out of her way to treat Noir as an equal. For combat training, ex adventurer Elna Stongs tries to teach the class a skill to avoid an opponent's strike, promising an erotic prize to anyone who uses it successfully. In the end, Noir is the only one to manage, using Get Creative as a shortcut, and is treated to a full body dry hump under Elna's buttocks, raising his LP. Maria is overcome by the pain of her curse, which Noir is determined to cure, but is informed by Great Sage a vast amount of LP is required. As he is already low on LP, Noir kisses Emma without thinking and is punished by Elna. Asking Lola's advice, Noir learns about Luna, a cleric known for her healing abilities, but is warned Luna almost never deals with curses for personal reasons.
4	"The Untainted Cleric"; Transliteration: "Kegarenaki Seijo" (Japanese: 穢れなき聖女)	Ryōki Kamitsubo	Kenta Ihara	January 30, 2021
Lola visits Luna, who happens to be her best friend. Meanwhile, Noir visits Olivia and has to grovel after not visiting. To help Maria, Olivia teaches him her skill, Lucky Lecher, which will generate LP through accidental perversion. Luna later meets with them and reveals she has met Maria already but had to refuse to help. With his Discerning Eye, Noir realizes that lifting curses shortens Luna's own lifespan, and lifting a curse like Maria's would kill her instantly, so he is surprised when she agrees to lift the curse and die. A child is injured and Luna heals him, but suddenly becomes terrified. Examining her skills again, Noir sees she has the useless skill Cowardice, which makes her more of a coward the lower her magic drops. Lola is furious Luna hid her own suffering, but is glad she knows. Noir realizes it would cost less LP to change Lifespan in Luna's skill to Finances, so that lifting curses costs gold instead of life, but still requires more LP. To generate the LP quickly, Lola takes him to a secret gathering of Harem Pride, a cult of jealous men who rate the attractiveness of each other's girlfriends.
5	"The Future of This Harem"; Transliteration: "Hāremu no Yukusue" (Japanese: ハーレムの行く末)	Keisuke Warita	Kenta Ihara	February 6, 2021
The crowd mercilessly criticizes the girlfriends' physical attractiveness. Emma, Lola, and Luna all pose as Noir's harem and win over the crowd by acting out romantic scenarios with Noir, raising his LP from winning the prize money and enjoying the attention of all three girls at once. They rush to Maria's home where they explain to Maria's parents the reason Luna could not cure Maria before and what they have done to let her lift the curse without risk. Overhearing everything Noir did for her, and realizing that he used most of his LP, Maria kisses him. Luna manages to lift the curse with less than a minute to spare. Maria swears to spend the rest of her life repaying her debt to Noir, making the girls even more jealous as they realize Maria has a crush on Noir. The situation for Noir becomes downright dangerous when Luna admits she also has fallen for Noir. Afterwards, he visits Olivia to pass on the good news and is surprised when Olivia demands a kiss as well. However, he can only bring himself to kiss her on the forehead.
6	"The Tulip Lion"; Transliteration: "Chūrippu Raion" (Japanese: チューリップライオン)	Yū Yabūchi	Kenta Ihara	February 13, 2021
Maria's father generously pays everyone one million gold, which Noir plans to save for his future. Noir then decides to open a shop selling rare monster materials, with his mother, father and sister as employees. Heading to the dungeon to begin harvesting monster materials, Noir learns some more useful skills from Olivia. Making it to level 5, Noir comes across a Pitch Black Lion and attempts to flee, only for the lion to speak. The lion, Tigerson, explains he was friends with an elf adventurer, Vashelle, and they explored the dungeon together, but Vashelle insisted on exploring level 6 alone and disappeared 350 years ago. However, Tigerson hopes Vashelle might still be alive. On level 6, Noir discovers Vashelle is a zombie and uses Get Creative to turn him back. Overwhelmed by Tigerson's loyalty, Vashelle thanks him but decides to return home, hoping to find his beloved. As magical creatures are forbidden there, Vashelle and Tigerson are forced to say goodbye, so Noir offers to be Tigerson's new friend and let him live at his family home. Tigerson is eagerly welcomed by Noir's family, who offer to employ him as security for their new shop.
7	"The Receptionist Ranking"; Transliteration: "Uketsukejō Rankingu" (Japanese: 受付嬢ランキング)	Masahiro Okamura	Kenta Ihara	February 20, 2021
Maria begins hugging Noir in public. Their first exam is announced where they must collect specific monster materials or else attend summer school. Noir and Emma ask Lola for help, only to find her in a fight with Sarah, another receptionist who has been stealing Lola's clients, thus lowering Lola's performance evaluation. As there is no proof Sarah broke any rules, Lola challenges her to a competition where if she scores higher on their next evaluation, Sarah never steals another client, but if she loses Sarah takes Noir as a client. Noir is terrified as he uses Discerning Eye to reveal that Sarah's skills are sadistically erotic. Noir, Emma and Luna begin completing as many jobs as possible, raising Lola's evaluation. However, after passing their exam, they find it is still not enough to beat Sarah, whose adventurers are driving themselves beyond exhaustion in hopes she will reward them. Asking Olivia for help, Noir is advised to defeat the dungeon's seventh floor for its treasures and is given several more of her skills. Reaching floor seven, Noir finds himself in an underground forest where an elf girl watches him from the trees.
8	"A Little Girl's Wish"; Transliteration: "Yōjo no Onegai" (Japanese: 幼女のお願い)	Tatsuya Sasaki	Kenta Ihara	February 27, 2021
The girl, Dory the Dryade, asks for Noir's help, explaining Dryades are tree spirits, and a monster is attacking her tree, draining her magic and slowly killing her. She promises to show him two treasure chests and the entrance to level 8 if he helps her. Noir discovers a Gold Bee monster that is so powerful its sting will be instantly fatal, but he decides to help. Grateful, Dory heals a small wound on his lip by kissing and licking it, raising his LP considerably. He returns to Olivia, who advises against risking his life for a stranger, but is eventually convinced and tells him how to win. Using Get Creative, he convinces a nearby pack of Silver Wolves to attack the Bee. The pack is killed, but the Bee is weakened enough that Noir kills it easily. After promising to visit Dory frequently, Noir finds two rare items in the chests, one he gives to Emma to strengthen her wind magic and the other to Lola to increase her evaluation. In the end, Lola wins the evaluation. While Sarah is forbidden from stealing anyone else's clients for life, she still attempts to seduce Noir.
9	"To the Gala"; Transliteration: "Yakai e Gō" (Japanese: 夜会へゴー)	Keisuke Warita	Kenta Ihara	March 6, 2021
Emma invites Noir to a party for nobles. Meanwhile, as a baronet, Noir's father is unfairly prohibited from renting a space for Noir's shop. At the party, the Earl announces the notorious Phantom Thief has threatened to steal his jewel, the Mermaid's Tear, so he has hired the Lahmu guild as security. Emma is approached by Mike Kental, a noble, who challenges Noir to see who the better dancer is. Noir uses LP to gain dancing skills and is declared victor. The Phantom Thief then arrives, steals the Tear, and kidnaps Emma. Leila Overlock, from Lahmu, chases her with Noir. The Phantom Thief summons a Phoenix, which Leila defeats while Noir defeats the Phantom Thief. Suddenly, they are pinned by her partner, Tom Bertholda, who declares he will marry Emma. A furious Noir declares Emma is precious to him. Emma awakens and they defeat Tom together. Afterwards, Emma is worried that Noir might think she is now dirty, but he reassures her with a kiss. Despite being from rival guilds, Leila agrees she and Noir can be friends. As thanks, the Earl helps Noir open his shop and gets him a massive discount on the rent.
10	"Let's Go to the Hot Springs"; Transliteration: "Onsen e Ikō" (Japanese: 温泉へ行こう)	Yoshihisa Matsumoto	Kenta Ihara	March 13, 2021
Leila transfers into the academy. Elna then announces a hot spring training camp. During the trip, she informs them they must defend themselves from monsters without her help. Noir almost falls into a trap and is told by a friendly pixie bandits are responsible. The pixie tells them of a shortcut to the hot spring, but Noir is suspicious and discerns the pixie has an ability to control monsters. After they defeat her lizardmen army, Noir captures the pixie. At the hot spring, the girls bathe first and the boys hatch a plan to peek at them. Noir refuses to participate and flees, running into Elna, who helps him. One of the boys, Hjorth, reveals he has been abusing strength potions for this very moment. To protect Emma, Noir creates the skill Powerless and gives it to Hjorth, defeating him. However, he has to use more LP to stop another boy. In the end, it turns out the girls have not bathe yet. Noir passes out from low LP, so Elna rewards him by letting him bathe with the girls, albeit blindfolded. Knowing his LP is low, both Emma and Elna massage him with their breasts.
11	"Noir's Decision"; Transliteration: "Noru no Ketsui" (Japanese: ノルの決意)	Noboru Koshihisa	Kenta Ihara	March 20, 2021
Noir opens his shop, Stardian Rarities. In gratitude, Noir tells Olivia he will free her from the Death Chains. Great Sage informs him a solution is on the dungeon's 15th floor. Noir takes Emma with him to floor 14 where they defeat an army of rude goblins. On floor 15, they find a clone of Olivia, the Death Chains' true form, which possesses Olivia's abilities and they are forced to flee. They ask Olivia if she has any weaknesses the clone might also have. Olivia initially refuses to tell them because Emma has bigger breasts than her. However, when Noir insists he has to free her for everything she has done for him, she admits she once almost lost a fight but never knew why. After investigating, Noir finds a story of Olivia battling a cleric called Littorine, who possessed the rare skill Sacrifice that temporarily boosts abilities by sacrificing already learned skills. Noir spends 10,000 LP to create Sacrifice just as the clone confronts him, having escaped the dungeon to continue their unfinished duel. Noir activates Sacrifice only to realize the clone also possesses Get Creative and she paralyzes him with a superior clone of his own sword.
12	"A Battle I Can't Lose"; Transliteration: "Makerarenai Tatakai" (Japanese: 負けられない戦い)	Kenta Ōnishi	Kenta Ihara	March 27, 2021
Olivia reminisces about an event from 200 years ago where a young man died because she did not properly tutor him. Noir meanwhile is still in battle against Olivia's clone when Emma, Lola, Luna and Leila show up. While the girls' combined attack successfully manages to break her sword, they are suddenly struck with a fever bestowed on them by the clone. She also bestows Noir with the Sluggish status and edits his Stone Bullet skill. Realizing the clone is much more creative than he is, Noir sacrifices all of his remaining skills except for Get Creative, Editor, Bestow, and Sacrifice to give himself the boost needed to continue fighting. In retaliation, the clone attacks Noir with a fire dragon, but Noir cuts through it, igniting his sword, and he strikes the final blow at the clone. The girls then replenish his LP after they recover. Noir visits the dungeon where Olivia thanks and embraces him for his effort. In the end, Olivia informs Noir that since the Death Chains are gone, he is now able to continue exploring the remaining floors of the dungeon.
