= King Cashing =

2011 video game

King Cashing: Slots Adventure
- Developer: Productions Multimage Inc.
- Publisher: Productions Multimage Inc.
- Platform: iOS
- Release: October 6, 2011

King Cashing: Slots Adventure is an iOS game developed by Canadian studio Productions Multimage Inc. and released on October 6, 2011. It spawned a sequel entitled King Cashing 2, which was released on February 28, 2013.

== Reception ==
=== King Cashing ===
Touch Arcade gave the game 4/5 and wrote "King Cashing certainly isn't for everyone, particularly if you're not a fan of RPGs or the slot-machine mechanic. However, for anyone that's remotely interested, you owe it to yourself to check it out." Gamezebo rated the game 3.5 stars, commenting "At its core, there is not a whole lot on offer gameplay-wise. You're essentially playing slots over top of some basic RPG elements. That being said, there are much worst [sic] things to spend your money on. If you're looking for a unique way to waste a couple minutes at a time, King Cashing will do just fine." TouchGen gave the game 70%, writing "King Cashing is a great way to spend time, and it can be really exciting at the end of battles. At times the fact that it is a slot machine shines through, and then it feels all random and no skill."

=== King Cashing 2 ===
The game has a Metacritic score of 85% based on 7 critic reviews.

TouchGen wrote "King Cashing 2 improves on the original in ways I couldn't even imagine, and takes the formula into a completely new realm. This is the kind of game that you can play for hours without knowing it, or just as well play for five minutes on the bus. No matter how, and when you play it you will have a great time. " SlideToPlay said "Even if you don't normally enjoy slot machines, King Cashing 2 combines an impressive and unique combat mechanic with outstanding comic-book artwork. " TouchArcade said "Where the original at times felt like a nicely implemented tech demo, King Cashing 2 is an excellent game in its own right, improving on nearly every facet over the original and well worth checking out. " AppSmile wrote "Featuring an updated graphical interface, a loose storyline, and lots of zombies, weapons, and perks of varying powers to mix-and-match, King Cashing 2 offers an even deeper take on its already addicting gameplay. "

Gamezebo wrote "This is a sequel that improves upon its predecessor in multiple ways, and it's hard to ask for or expect more than that. With its strangely compelling mix of skill, luck and strategy, King Cashing 2 is a second trip worth taking. Dare we hope it becomes a trilogy? " MacLife said "While it's a short romp, there's a lot of replay value in this unusual game of chance. King Cashing 2 duct-tapes some strange ideas together to make a fun and funny offering that'll hook you right away. " Pocket Gamer UK said "There's fun to be had spinning the reels, but King Cashing 2 doesn't do enough to stave off the inherent shallowness of its battles."
