= Malevolence: The Sword of Ahkranox =

2012 video game

- Developer(s): Visual Outbreak
- Publisher(s): Visual Outbreak
- Designer(s): Alex Norton
- Writer(s): Ryan A. Span
- Composer(s): Nicolas Lee
- Platform(s): Microsoft Windows
- Release: December 21, 2012
- Genre(s): Action role-playing, Dungeon crawl
- Mode(s): Single-player

Malevolence: The Sword of Ahkranox is an action role-playing game from Australian indie developer "Visual Outbreak". The game is a turn-based, grid-based, first-person dungeon crawler inspired by classic 1980s and 1990s first person role-playing games. It was released to open beta on February 3, 2013 for Windows.

Malevolence: The Sword of Ahkranox is the first turn-based RPG to have a truly infinite game world that is both persistent and identical for all players. The engine makes use of procedural world generation to create an infinite in-game world which is the same for every player, meaning that separate players can find the same landmarks and NPCs. The development of the game was funded via Kickstarter.

== Gameplay ==
Malevolence: The Sword of Ahkranox is a first-person turn-based action role-playing game. The player controls a chosen one, whom they move through an infinite, 3D rendered, grid-based world. Much of the gameplay's inspiration was taken from early RPG titles such as Eye of the Beholder and Might & Magic, with world generation taking much inspiration from games such as Daggerfall.

The gameplay consists of roguelike elements, such as exploration, looting and quest completion to advance the player's character. The loot and quests in the game are generated procedurally as are the environments in which the player explores.

A major part of the game is character development. Since the game is infinite, Malevolence does not employ a standard statistical model, but instead gives the player six core statistics represented as percentages - all which equal a total of 100% at all times. As the player gains in strength, they weaken in magical abilities and speed, and vice versa, thus making stat management an important part of the game.
